= List of West Texas A&M Buffaloes in the NFL draft =

This is a list of West Texas A&M Buffaloes football players in the NFL draft.

== Key ==
B	Back	K	Kicker	NT	Nose tackle
C	Center	LB	Linebacker	FB	Fullback
DB	Defensive back	P	Punter	HB	Halfback
DE	Defensive end	QB	Quarterback	WR	Wide receiver
DT	Defensive tackle	RB	Running back	G	Guard
E	End	T	Offensive tackle	TE	Tight end

== Selections ==
Year	Round	Pick	Overall	Player	Team	Position
1939	15	4	134	Foster Watkins	Philadelphia Eagles	B
1942	20	5	185	Ben Collins	Detroit Lions	B
1945	5	10	42	Ed Castleberry	New York Giants	B
1946	9	8	78	Bill Hedges	Detroit Lions	T
1948	7	5	50	Noel Cudd	Los Angeles Rams	T
1948	20	3	178	Cloyce Box	Washington Redskins	B
1949	22	5	216	Lloyd Johnson	Pittsburgh Steelers	B
1951	13	10	157	Charley Wright	Chicago Bears	B
1951	24	4	283	Billy Cross	Chicago Cardinals	B
1951	29	5	344	Bruce Womack	Detroit Lions	T
1952	25	4	293	Bob Kelley	Philadelphia Eagles	C
1956	26	1	302	Joe Walden	Detroit Lions	B
1957	25	1	290	Bob Ratliff	Philadelphia Eagles	B
1958	8	10	95	Ron Mills	San Francisco 49ers	B
1958	22	5	258	Charley Sanders	Washington Redskins	B
1958	28	2	327	Gale McGinty	Chicago Cardinals	B
1959	8	12	96	Tommy Coffey	Baltimore Colts	B
1959	28	1	325	Jerry Epps	Green Bay Packers	G
1961	15	6	202	Ray McCown	Pittsburgh Steelers	B
1963	4	5	47	Jerry Logan	Baltimore Colts	B
1963	6	12	82	Bob Petrich	New York Giants	T
1963	15	8	204	Oliver Ross	San Francisco 49ers	B
1964	3	7	35	Jerry Richardson	Los Angeles Rams	B
1964	7	7	91	John Varnell	Los Angeles Rams	T
1966	17	5	250	George Allen	Dallas Cowboys	T
1967	6	10	143	Doug Kriewald	Chicago Bears	G
1967	9	16	227	Ted Wheeler	St. Louis Cardinals	TE
1967	13	16	331	Bob Duncum	St. Louis Cardinals	T
1967	13	20	335	Marc Allen	Baltimore Colts	DE
1968	3	4	59	Dave Szymakowski	New Orleans Saints	WR
1968	14	17	371	Jim Campbell	San Diego Chargers	LB
1968	17	18	453	Dan Andrew	San Diego Chargers	TE
1969	3	11	63	Mercury Morris	Miami Dolphins	RB
1969	6	3	133	A. Z. Drones	Los Angeles Rams	T
1969	9	11	219	Jesse Powell	Miami Dolphins	LB
1969	16	14	404	Byron Jones	New York Giants	LB
1970	1	23	23	Duane Thomas	Dallas Cowboys	RB
1970	15	22	386	Dag Azam	Los Angeles Rams	G
1970	16	22	412	Roland Reichardt	Los Angeles Rams	K
1971	1	18	18	Rocky Thompson	New York Giants	WR
1971	5	22	126	Ralph Anderson	Pittsburgh Steelers	DB
1971	6	18	148	Ray Brown	Atlanta Falcons	DB
1972	16	12	402	Bill McKinney	Chicago Bears	LB
1974	6	16	146	Billy Pritchett	Cleveland Browns	RB
1974	12	14	300	Carl Brown	Kansas City Chiefs	WR
1976	3	2	62	Jeff Lloyd	Seattle Seahawks	DE
1976	5	1	125	Michael Kelson	Tampa Bay Buccaneers	DB
1976	8	14	223	John Ayers	San Francisco 49ers	T
1978	4	10	94	William Fifer	Detroit Lions	T
1979	3	11	67	Bo Robinson	Detroit Lions	RB
1980	9	7	228	Glen Keller	Atlanta Falcons	C
1981	4	6	89	John Holt	Tampa Bay Buccaneers	DB
1982	2	24	51	Reggie McElroy	New York Jets	T
1982	9	4	227	Milton Baker	Cleveland Browns	TE
1982	10	24	275	Darryl Hemphill	New York Jets	DB
1983	9	19	243	Robin Ham	Green Bay Packers	C
1988	10	6	255	Newt Harrell	Los Angeles Raiders	T
2000	4	15	109	Kareem Larrimore	Dallas Cowboys	DB
2003	2	20	52	Chaun Thompson	Cleveland Browns	LB
2009	6	23	196	Keith Null	St. Louis Rams	QB
2010	7	11	218	J'Marcus Webb	Chicago Bears	T
