= 1964 American Football League draft =

American Football League draft

1964 AFL draft

General information
- Date: November 30, 1963
- Location: New York City

Overview
- 208 total selections in 26 rounds
- League: AFL
- First selection: John Conannon, QB; Boston Patriots
- Mr. Irrelevant: Frank Kinard, FB; San Diego Chargers
- Hall of Famers: 9

The 1964 American Football League draft was held in New York City on Saturday, November 30, 1963.

The first selection was quarterback John Concannon of Boston College, taken by the Boston Patriots. The NFL draft was held two days later in Chicago.

== Player selections ==
= Pro Bowler	= AFL All-Star	= Hall of Famer

=== Round 1 ===
Pick #	AFL Team	Player	Position	College
1	Boston Patriots ^{(Pick acquired from Denver)}	Jack Concannon	Quarterback	Boston College
2	Kansas City Chiefs	Pete Beathard	Quarterback	USC
3	New York Jets	Matt Snell	Running back	Ohio State
4	Denver Broncos ^{(Pick acquired from Boston)}	Bob Brown	Tackle	Nebraska
5	Buffalo Bills	Carl Eller	Defensive end	Minnesota
6	Houston Oilers	Scott Appleton	Defensive tackle	Texas
7	Oakland Raiders	Tony Lorick	Running back	Arizona State
8	San Diego Chargers	Ted Davis	Linebacker	Georgia Tech

=== Round 2 ===
Pick #	AFL Team	Player	Position	College
9	Houston Oilers ^{(Pick acquired from Denver)}	Charley Taylor	Wide receiver	Arizona State
10	Kansas City Chiefs	Bill Martin	Tight end	Georgia Tech
11	New York Jets	Lloyd Voss	Defensive end	Nebraska
12	Buffalo Bills	Dick Evey	Defensive tackle	Tennessee
13	Boston Patriots	Jim Kelly	Tight end	Notre Dame
14	Houston Oilers	Billy Truax	Tight end	Louisiana State
15	Oakland Raiders	Dan Conners	Linebacker	Miami
16	San Diego Chargers	John Kirby	Linebacker	Nebraska

=== Round 3 ===
Pick #	AFL Team	Player	Position	College
17	Denver Broncos	Marv Woodson	Defensive back	Indiana
18	Kansas City Chiefs	Ken Kortas	Defensive tackle	Louisville
19	New York Jets	Gerry Philbin	Defensive end	Buffalo
20	Denver Broncos ^{(Pick acquired from Boston)}	Matt Snorton	Tight end	Michigan State
21	Buffalo Bills	George Rose	Defensive back	Auburn
22	Houston Oilers	Bobby Crenshaw	Tackle	Baylor
23	Oakland Raiders	George Bednar	Tackle	Notre Dame
24	San Diego Chargers	Perry Lee Dunn	Running back	Mississippi

=== Round 4 ===
Pick #	AFL Team	Player	Position	College
25	Buffalo Bills ^{(Pick acquired from Denver)}	Butch Byrd	Defensive back	Boston University
26	Kansas City Chiefs	Ed Lothamer	Defensive tackle	Michigan State
27	New York Jets	Jim Evans	Wide receiver	Texas-El Paso
28	Buffalo Bills	Paul Warfield	Wide receiver	Ohio State
29	Boston Patriots	Jon Morris	Center	Holy Cross
30	Houston Oilers	Ode Burrell	Running back	Mississippi State
31	Oakland Raiders	Bill Budness	Linebacker	Boston University
32	San Diego Chargers	Dave Parks	Split End	Texas Tech

=== Round 5 ===
Pick #	AFL Team	Player	Position	College
33	Houston Oilers ^{(Pick acquired from Denver)}	John Varnell	Tackle	West Texas A&M
34	Kansas City Chiefs	Tom Keating	Defensive tackle	Michigan
35	New York Jets	Ben McGee	Defensive end	Jackson State
36	San Diego Chargers ^{(Pick acquired from Boston)}	Pete Goimarac	Center	West Virginia
37	Buffalo Bills	Mike Reilly	Linebacker	Iowa
38	Houston Oilers	Sid Blanks	Running back	Texas A&M-Kingsville
39	Oakland Raiders	Don Green	Defensive back	Susquehanna
40	San Diego Chargers	Gary Kirner	Guard	USC

=== Round 6 ===
Pick #	AFL Team	Player	Position	College
41	Denver Broncos	Don Shackelford	Guard	Pacific
42	Kansas City Chiefs	Duke Carlisle	Defensive back	Texas
43	New York Jets	Ralph Baker	Linebacker	Penn State
44	Kansas City Chiefs ^{(Pick acquired from Buffalo)}	Joe Don Looney	Halfback	Oklahoma
45	Boston Patriots	Jim Mazurek	Guard	Syracuse
46	Houston Oilers	Dave Wilcox	Linebacker	Oregon
47	Denver Broncos ^{(Pick acquired from Oakland)}	Al Denson	Flanker	Florida A&M
48	San Diego Chargers	Willie Brown	Wide receiver	USC

=== Round 7 ===
Pick #	AFL Team	Player	Position	College
49	Denver Broncos	Ray Kubala	Center	Texas A&M
50	Kansas City Chiefs	John Simon	End	Notre Dame
51	San Diego Chargers ^{(Pick acquired from New YorK)}	Roger Anderson	Defensive tackle	Virginia Union
52	Boston Patriots	T.W. Alley	Tackle	William & Mary
53	Buffalo Bills	Roger Pillath	Tackle	Wisconsin
54	Denver Broncos ^{(Pick acquired from Houston)}	Jerry Richardson	Defensive back	West Texas A&M
55	Oakland Raiders	John Sapinsky	Tackle	William & Mary
56	San Diego Chargers	Pat Batten	Fullback	Hardin–Simmons

=== Round 8 ===
Pick #	AFL Team	Player	Position	College
57	Denver Broncos	Wally Hilgenberg	Linebacker	Iowa
58	Kansas City Chiefs	Hal Bedsole	Tight end	USC
59	New York Jets	Steve Wright	Tackle	Alabama
60	Boston Patriots ^{(Pick acquired from Buffalo)}	J.D. Garrett	Halfback	Grambling State
61	Boston Patriots	Roger LaLonde	Defensive tackle	Muskingum
62	Houston Oilers	Ezell Seals	Halfback	Prairie View A&M
63	Oakland Raiders	Vince Petno	Defensive back	The Citadel
64	San Diego Chargers	George Seals	Guard	Missouri

=== Round 9 ===
Pick #	AFL Team	Player	Position	College
65	Denver Broncos	John Mims	Tackle	Rice
66	Kansas City Chiefs	Tony DiMidio	Tackle	West Chester
67	New York Jets	Sherman Lewis	Defensive back	Michigan State
68	Boston Patriots	Len St. Jean	Guard	Northern Michigan
69	Buffalo Bills	Paul Martha	Defensive back	Pittsburgh
70	Houston Oilers	Jerry Burton	Halfback	Northwestern Louisiana
71	Oakland Raiders	J. R. Williamson	Linebacker	Louisiana Tech
72	Oakland Raiders ^{(Pick acquired from San Diego)}	Herschel Turner	Tackle	Kentucky

=== Round 10 ===
Pick #	AFL Team	Player	Position	College
73	Kansas City Chiefs ^{(Pick acquired from Denver)}	Clay Stephens	End	Notre Dame
74	San Diego Chargers ^{(Pick acquired from Kansas City)}	Bob Long	Flanker	Wichita State
75	New York Jets	Ken Bowman	Center	Wisconsin
76	Buffalo Bills	Howard Simpson	Defensive end	Auburn
77	Buffalo Bills ^{(Pick acquired from Boston)}	Earl Lattimer	Fullback	Michigan State
78	Houston Oilers	Sammy Odom	Defensive tackle	Northwestern State
79	Oakland Raiders	Mel Renfro	Defensive back	Oregon
80	San Diego Chargers	Dick Bowman	End	Syracuse

=== Round 11 ===
Pick #	AFL Team	Player	Position	College
81	Buffalo Bills ^{(Pick acquired from Denver)}	Bobby Smith	Halfback	North Texas
82	Kansas City Chiefs	Tommy Crutcher	Linebacker	TCU
83	New York Jets	Bob Lacey	Wide receiver	North Carolina
84	Boston Patriots	John Barrett	Halfback	Boston College
85	Buffalo Bills	Cloyd Webb	End	Iowa
86	Houston Oilers	Owen De Janovich	Guard	Northern Arizona
87	Oakland Raiders	Larry Rakestraw	Quarterback	Georgia
88	San Diego Chargers	Bob Horton	Linebacker	Boston University

=== Round 12 ===
Pick #	AFL Team	Player	Position	College
89	Denver Broncos	Paul Krause	Defensive back	Iowa
90	Buffalo Bills ^{(Pick acquired from Kansas City)}	Willie Ross	Fullback	Nebraska
91	New York Jets	Rudy Johnson	Halfback	Nebraska
92	Buffalo Bills	Pete Gogolak	Kicker	Cornell
93	Kansas City Chiefs ^{(Pick acquired from Boston)}	Jack Adams	End	Virginia Tech
94	Houston Oilers	Benny Nelson	Defensive back	Alabama
95	Oakland Raiders	Billy Lothridge	Defensive back	Georgia Tech
96	San Diego Chargers	Ron Carpenter	Linebacker	Texas A&M

=== Round 13 ===
Pick #	AFL Team	Player	Position	College
97	Denver Broncos	Charlie Parker	Guard	Southern Mississippi
98	Kansas City Chiefs	Orville Hudson	End	Texas A&M-Commerce
99	New York Jets	Jeff Ware	Linebacker	Pittsburgh
100	Boston Patriots	Joe Scarpati	Defensive back	North Carolina State
101	Buffalo Bills	Joe O'Donnell	Guard	Michigan
102	Kansas City Chiefs ^{(Pick acquired from Houston)}	Jay Wilkinson	Halfback	Duke
103	Oakland Raiders	Mickey Babb	End	Georgia
104	San Diego Chargers	Kenny Graham	Defensive back	Washington State

=== Round 14 ===
Pick #	AFL Team	Player	Position	College
105	Denver Broncos	Bob Hayes*	Split End	Florida A&M
106	Kansas City Chiefs	Paul Costa*	Tight end	Notre Dame
107	New York Jets	Charley Brooks*	End	Memphis
108	Buffalo Bills	Remi Prudhomme*	Center	Louisiana State
109	Boston Patriots	Jim Wilson*	Guard	Georgia
110	Houston Oilers	Ken Henson*	Center	TCU
111	Oakland Raiders	Fred Polser*	Guard	Texas A&M-Commerce
112	San Diego Chargers	Howard Kindig*	Defensive end	Cal State Los Angeles

=== Round 15 ===
Pick #	AFL Team	Player	Position	College
113	Denver Broncos	Chuck Logan	Tight end	Northwestern
114	Kansas City Chiefs	Jim Snowden*	Tackle	Notre Dame
115	New York Jets	Herman Johnson*	Defensive back	Michigan State
116	Boston Patriots	Tony Gibbons	Tackle	John Carroll
117	Buffalo Bills	Bill Simpson*	Tackle	Baylor
118	Houston Oilers	Pat Crain*	Fullback	Clemson
119	Oakland Raiders	Mike Giers*	Tackle	USC
120	San Diego Chargers	Ed Mitchell*	Guard	Saginaw Valley State

=== Round 16 ===
Pick #	AFL Team	Player	Position	College
121	Denver Broncos	Bob Cherry	End	Wittenberg
122	Kansas City Chiefs	Roger Staubach*	Quarterback	Navy
123	New York Jets	Ray Popp*	Linebacker	Pittsburgh
124	Boston Patriots	Pete Pedro	Halfback	West Texas A&M
125	Buffalo Bills	John Hilton*	Tight end	Richmond
126	Houston Oilers	Bill Munson	Quarterback	Utah State
127	Oakland Raiders	Ron Wilkening*	Halfback	North Dakota
128	San Diego Chargers	Bob Daugherty*	Halfback	Tulsa

=== Round 17 ===
Pick #	AFL Team	Player	Position	College
129	Denver Broncos	Jim McNaughton	End	Utah State
130	Kansas City Chiefs	Jack Petersen	Tackle	Nebraska-Omaha
131	New York Jets	Bob Lehman	Guard	Notre Dame
132	Boston Patriots	Gary Wood	Quarterback	Cornell
133	Buffalo Bills	Larry Kramer*	Tackle	Nebraska
134	Houston Oilers	Dick Leeuwenburg*	Tackle	Stanford
135	Oakland Raiders	Fred Lewis*	Halfback	Massachusetts
136	San Diego Chargers	John Farris*	Guard	San Diego State

=== Round 18 ===
Pick #	AFL Team	Player	Position	College
137	Denver Broncos	George Mira	Quarterback	Miami
138	Kansas City Chiefs	Jerry Knoll*	Tackle	Washington
139	New York Jets	Bill Scott	Guard	Memphis
140	Boston Patriots	Joe Tiller	Tackle	Montana State
141	Buffalo Bills	Hagood Clarke	Defensive back	Florida
142	Houston Oilers	Bob Nichols*	Tackle	Stanford
143	Oakland Raiders	Ron Calcagno	Quarterback	Santa Clara
144	San Diego Chargers	Bob Robinson*	Guard	Mississippi

=== Round 19 ===
Pick #	AFL Team	Player	Position	College
145	Denver Broncos	Odell Barry	Wide receiver	Findlay
146	Kansas City Chiefs	Jerry Lamb*	End	Arkansas
147	New York Jets	Glen Condren*	Defensive tackle	Oklahoma
148	Boston Patriots	Bill Dawson*	Tight end	Florida State
149	Buffalo Bills	Don Montgomery	End	North Carolina State
150	Houston Oilers	Carl Robinson	Tackle	Prairie View A&M
151	Oakland Raiders	Tom Michel	Halfback	East Carolina
152	San Diego Chargers	Paul Cercel*	Center	Pittsburgh

=== Round 20 ===
Pick #	AFL Team	Player	Position	College
153	Kansas City Chiefs ^{(Pick acquired from Denver)}	Sandy Sands*	End	Texas
154	Kansas City Chiefs	Bob Hohn*	Defensive back	Nebraska
155	New York Jets	Dick Shiner	Quarterback	Maryland
156	Boston Patriots	Lonnie Farmer	Linebacker	Tennessee-Chattanooga
157	Buffalo Bills	Bob Dugan	Tackle	Mississippi State
158	Houston Oilers	Pete Jaquess	Defensive back	Eastern New Mexico
159	Oakland Raiders	Ed Beard	Linebacker	Tennessee
160	San Diego Chargers	Dick Klein*	Tackle	Wichita State

=== Round 21 ===
Pick #	AFL Team	Player	Position	College
161	Denver Broncos	Dick Herzing*	Tackle	Drake
162	Kansas City Chiefs	Bob Burrows*	Tackle	Texas A&M-Commerce
163	New York Jets	Larry Hand*	Defensive end	Appalachian State
164	Boston Patriots	Tony Lawrence*	Tackle	Bowling Green
165	Buffalo Bills	John Deibert*	Tackle	Penn State
166	Houston Oilers	Jerry Cole*	Halfback	Texas State
167	Oakland Raiders	Carleton Oats*	Defensive tackle	Florida A&M
168	San Diego Chargers	Allen Robinson*	Halfback	BYU

=== Round 22 ===
Pick #	AFL Team	Player	Position	College
169	Denver Broncos	Gary Lewis*	Running back	Arizona State
170	Kansas City Chiefs	Dick Evers*	Tackle	Colorado State
171	New York Jets	Will Radosevich*	Tackle	Wyoming
172	Boston Patriots	Dave Archer*	Tackle	Syracuse
173	Buffalo Bills	John Briscoe*	Linebacker	Arizona
174	Houston Oilers	Ed Kesler	Fullback	North Carolina
175	Oakland Raiders	Jim Long*	Fullback	Fresno State
176	San Diego Chargers	Chuck Hinton*	Center	Mississippi

=== Round 23 ===
Pick #	AFL Team	Player	Position	College
177	Denver Broncos	Ken Brusven*	Tackle	Oregon State
178	Kansas City Chiefs	Bud Abell*	Linebacker	Missouri
179	New York Jets	Cornell Gordon*	Defensive back	North Carolina A&T
180	Boston Patriots	Dave Humenik*	Tackle	Notre Dame
181	Buffalo Bills	John Evans*	Tackle	Memphis
182	Houston Oilers	Jim Whitehead*	Tackle	Georgia
183	Oakland Raiders	Bill Curry*	Center	Georgia Tech
184	San Diego Chargers	Ron Smith*	Quarterback	Richmond

=== Round 24 ===
Pick #	AFL Team	Player	Position	College
185	Denver Broncos	Mickey Bitsko*	Linebacker	Dayton
186	Kansas City Chiefs	Bob Young*	Tackle	Austin
187	New York Jets	Mike Mayne*	End	Idaho
188	Boston Patriots	Larry Bartolameolli*	Tackle	Western Michigan
189	Buffalo Bills	Dick Schott*	Tackle	Louisville
190	Houston Oilers	John Garrett*	Linebacker	Oklahoma
191	Oakland Raiders	Kent Francisco*	Tackle	UCLA
192	San Diego Chargers	Bill Van Burkleo*	Halfback	Tulsa

=== Round 25 ===
Pick #	AFL Team	Player	Position	College
193	Denver Broncos	Jim Jones*	Split End	Wisconsin
194	Kansas City Chiefs	Jerry McClurg*	Tackle	Colorado
195	New York Jets	Jerry Rhome*	Quarterback	Tulsa
196	Boston Patriots	Bryan Generalovich*	End	Pittsburgh
197	Buffalo Bills	Tom Urbanik*	Defensive back	Penn State
198	Houston Oilers	Dick Bowe*	Tackle	Rice
199	Oakland Raiders	Terry Sieg*	Halfback	Virginia
200	San Diego Chargers	Tommy Lucas*	Guard	Mississippi

=== Round 26 ===
Pick #	AFL Team	Player	Position	College
201	Denver Broncos	Bob Berry	Quarterback	Oregon
202	Kansas City Chiefs	Phil Zera*	Halfback	Saint Joseph's (IN)
203	New York Jets	John Butler*	Fullback	San Diego State
204	Boston Patriots	Dick Niglio*	Halfback	Yale
205	Buffalo Bills	Allen Jacobs*	Fullback	Utah
206	Houston Oilers	Alex Zenko*	Tackle	Kent State
207	Oakland Raiders	Gordon Guest*	Quarterback	Arkansas
208	San Diego Chargers	Frank Kinard*	Fullback	Mississippi

* This pick was considered a "Future" selection.

== Notable undrafted players ==
^{†}	= Pro Bowler

Original NFL team	Player	Pos.	College	Notes
Denver Broncos	John Amos	RB	Colorado State	
Houston Oilers	Willie Frazier	TE	Arkansas–Pine Bluff	
Houston Oilers	W.K. Hicks	CB	Texas Southern	
Kansas City Chiefs	Mack Lee Hill ^{†}	FB	Southern	
Kansas City Chiefs	Willie Mitchell	CB	Tennessee State	
New York Jets	Bill Rademacher	WR	Northern Michigan	
New York Jets	John Schmitt	C	Hofstra	
San Diego Chargers	Speedy Duncan ^{†}	CB	Jackson State	
San Diego Chargers	Jimmy Warren ^{†}	CB	Illinois	

== See also ==
- List of American Football League players
- History of American Football League draft
- List of professional American football drafts
