= Bob Nichols (American football) =

American football player (born 1943)

No. 65, 77
- Position: Offensive tackle

Personal information
- Born: July 18, 1943 (age 83); Los Angeles, California, U.S.
- Listed height: 6 ft 3 in (1.91 m)
- Listed weight: 250 lb (113 kg)

Career information
- High school: Narbonne (Los Angeles)
- College: Stanford (1960–1964)
- NFL draft: 1964: 9th round, 122nd overall pick

Career history
- Pittsburgh Steelers (1965); Los Angeles Rams (1966–1967)

Awards and highlights
- Third-team All-Pacific Coast (1964)
- Stats at Pro Football Reference

Robert Gordon Nichols Jr. (born July 18, 1943) is an American former professional football offensive tackle who played in the National Football League (NFL) with the Pittsburgh Steelers and Los Angeles Rams. He played college football for the Stanford Indians and was selected by the Steelers in the ninth round of the 1964 NFL draft.

== Early life ==
Robert Gordon Nichols Jr. was born on July 18, 1943, in Los Angeles, California. He attended Nathaniel Narbonne High School in Los Angeles.

== College career ==
Nichols enrolled at Stanford University to play college football for the Indians. He was on the freshmen team in 1960. He missed the 1961 season due to an ankle injury. Nichols was a three-year varsity letterman from 1962 to 1964. He earned United Press International third-team All-Pacific Coast honors at offensive guard for the 1964 season.

== Professional career ==
Nichols was selected by the Pittsburgh Steelers in the ninth round, with the 122nd overall pick, of the 1964 NFL draft and by the Houston Oilers in the 18th round, with the 142nd overall pick, of the 1964 AFL draft. At the conclusion of his college career, he signed a futures contract with the Steelers on December 1, 1964. He played in all 14 games, starting three, at offensive tackle for Pittsburgh in 1965. Nichols walked out of Steelers training camp in 1966 because he wanted to play on the West Coast.

On August 1, 1966, Nichols was traded to the Los Angeles Rams for Roger Pillath. Nichols played in 27 of 28 games for the Rams from 1966 to 1967 in a reserve role. He also appeared in one playoff game in 1967 as a backup. On July 8, 1968, his football career ended when he was drafted into the military.
