= Bill Van Burkleo =

American gridiron football player (born 1942)

No. 16 (CGY)
- Positions: Defensive back, quarterback, punter

Personal information
- Born: November 21, 1942 (age 83); Tulsa, Oklahoma, U.S.
- Died: May 20, 2026; Katy, Texas
- Listed height: 5 ft 11 in (1.80 m)
- Listed weight: 185 lb (84 kg)

Career information
- College: Tulsa
- NFL draft: 1964: 15th round, 200th overall pick
- AFL draft: 1964: 24th round, 192nd overall pick

Career history
- 1965: Dallas Cowboys*
- 1966: Toronto Argonauts
- 1967: Winnipeg Blue Bombers
- 1968–1970: Ottawa Rough Riders
- 1971: Calgary Stampeders
- 1972: Hamilton Tiger-Cats
- * Offseason or practice squad member only

Awards and highlights
- 4× Grey Cup champion (1968, 1969, 1971, 1972)

Career CFL statistics
- Games played: 86

William Ben Van Burkleo (born November 21, 1942) is an American former professional football defensive back in the Canadian Football League (CFL) for the Toronto Argonauts, Winnipeg Blue Bombers, Ottawa Rough Riders, Calgary Stampeders and Hamilton Tiger-Cats. He played college football at the University of Tulsa.

== Early life ==
Van Burkleo attended Will Rogers High School, where he practiced football, basketball and track. He was named the Tulsa World Oklahoma High School Football Player of the Year as a senior in 1959.

He accepted a football scholarship from the University of Oklahoma, but transferred after his sophomore season to the University of Tulsa. As a junior, he was a quarterback-halfback, posting 511 passing yards, 3 touchdowns, 9 interceptions, 123 rushing yards, one rushing touchdown, 135 receiving yards and 2 touchdowns.

As a senior, he was moved to wide receiver, registering 7 receptions for 122 yards and 2 touchdowns. He also was a part of the 1964 Bluebonnet Bowl Championship team.

In 1975, he was named by the Jim Thorpe Award Committee to the All-Time Greats of Oklahoma for the Decade of the 1950s. In 2018, he was inducted into the Tulsa Public Schools Athletic Hall of Fame.

== Professional career ==
Van Burkleo was selected by the Dallas Cowboys in the 15th round (200th overall) of the 1964 NFL draft with a future draft pick, which allowed the team to draft him before his college eligibility was over. He was also selected by the San Diego Chargers in the 24th round (192nd overall) of the 1964 AFL draft.

In 1965, he signed with the Dallas Cowboys. He was converted into a defensive back during training camp and was waived on August 31.

In 1966, he signed with the Toronto Argonauts of the Canadian Football League. Although he was a defensive back, he was also used as a punter and backup quarterback during his professional career.

In 1967, he saw his most extensive time at quarterback with the Winnipeg Blue Bombers, when he started in place of an injured Ken Ploen. On March 13, 1968, he was traded along with linebacker Al Miller to the Ottawa Rough Riders in exchange for defensive back Don Gilbert, linebacker Jim Conroy and offensive tackle Chuck Harrison.

On July 22, 1971, he was traded to the Calgary Stampeders in exchange for punter Marcel Deleeuw. On September 25, he suffered a separated shoulder and missed the remainder of the season, including the 59th Grey Cup 14–11 win against the Toronto Argonauts. On August 22, 1972, he signed with the Hamilton Tiger-Cats.

Van Burkleo was a part of the Grey Cup winning teams in 1968, 1969, 1971 and 1972. He finished his career with 19 defensive interceptions, 1,540 passing yards, 8 passing touchdowns, 22 thrown interceptions, 351 rushing yards and 2 rushing touchdowns.

== Personal life ==
After a career in football, he was a part owner and general manager of an advertising agency that published all of the CFL football programs, the magazine "Sports Canada," while producing film and video for the Canada television.

In 1973, he returned to Tulsa, Oklahoma, to work in the Tulsa Cable Television as the director of sports and special events.

Van Burkleo went to Medical school at Oklahoma State College of Osteopathic Medicine and Surgery and graduated in 1981. He practiced medicine in Corpus Christi, Texas.
