= Mike Reilly (1960s linebacker) =

American football player (1942–2019)

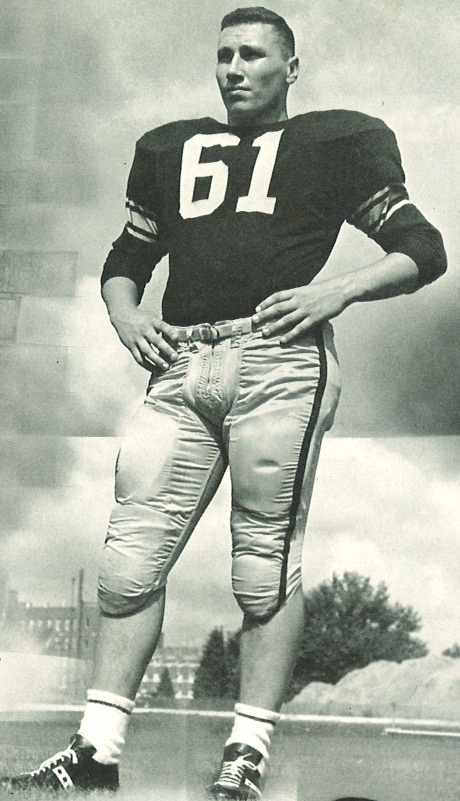

No. 62, 52
- Position: Linebacker

Personal information
- Born: March 27, 1942; Dubuque, Iowa, U.S.
- Died: October 18, 2019 (aged 77); Dubuque, Iowa, U.S.
- Listed height: 6 ft 3 in (1.91 m)
- Listed weight: 225 lb (102 kg)

Career information
- High school: Dubuque
- College: Iowa (1960-1963)
- NFL draft: 1964: 4th round, 47th overall pick
- AFL draft: 1964: 5th round, 37th overall pick

Career history
- Chicago Bears (1964–1968); Minnesota Vikings (1969)

Awards and highlights
- NFL champion (1969); First-team All-American (1963); First-team All-Big Ten (1963)

Career NFL statistics
- Fumble recoveries: 4
- Sacks: 1
- Stats at Pro Football Reference

Charles Michael Reilly (March 27, 1942 – October 18, 2019) was an American professional football player and broadcaster. A linebacker, he played college football at the University of Iowa and in the National Football League (NFL) for the Chicago Bears and Minnesota Vikings. He played for the 1969 NFL Champion Vikings squad that was defeated by the Kansas City Chiefs in Super Bowl IV.

== Career ==
Reilly was born on March 27, 1942, in Dubuque, Iowa to George and Theda Reilly. He was a football star at Dubuque Senior High School and was honored as an all-state player his senior year of 1959.

Reilly attended the University of Iowa. He was an All-Big Ten and All-American at offensive guard in 1963. He was invited to play in the East–West Shrine Bowl and the Hula Bowl. At the 1964 NFL draft, the Chicago Bears selected him in the fourth round. The university planned "Mike Reilly Day" in his honor; but the event was cancelled after the assassination of John F. Kennedy

He played six seasons with the Bears and was traded to the Dallas Cowboys after the 1969 NFL season. After the Cowboys released him, Reilly signed with the Minnesota Vikings. With the Vikings, he was a member of the 1969 NFL Champions that played in Super Bowl IV.

After his playing career ended, Reilly went into banking. He also worked as the color commentator for University of Iowa broadcasts for 25 years.

== Personal life ==
He married Mary Groff in 1964 and had three sons.

Reilly suffered from Alzheimer's disease in his later years. He died on October 18, 2019, in Dubuque.
