= Tony DiMidio =

American football player and coach (1942–2014)

No. 72
- Positions: Tackle, Center

Personal information
- Born: August 20, 1942; Bryn Mawr, Pennsylvania, U.S.
- Died: April 26, 2014 (aged 71); Delaware County, Pennsylvania, U.S.
- Listed height: 6 ft 3 in (1.91 m)
- Listed weight: 250 lb (113 kg)

Career information
- High school: Upper Darby (Upper Darby, Pennsylvania)
- College: West Chester (1960–1963)
- NFL draft: 1964: 5th round, 68th overall pick
- AFL draft: 1964: 9th round, 66th overall pick

Career history
- New York Giants (1964); Kansas City Chiefs (1966–1967); New York Jets (1968)*; Oakland Raiders (1969)*
- * Offseason or practice squad member only

Awards and highlights
- Super Bowl champion (III)

Career AFL statistics
- Games played: 26
- Games started: 2
- Fumble recoveries: 1
- Stats at Pro Football Reference

Tony DiMidio (August 20, 1942 – April 26, 2014) was an American football offensive tackle who played two seasons in the American Football League (AFL) for the Kansas City Chiefs. He died at his home in 2014.

== Coaching career ==
DiMidio joined Drexel as an assistant coach in 1971.

== See also ==
- List of American Football League players
