= Jimmy Jones (wide receiver) =

American football player (born 1941)

No. 80
- Position: Wide receiver

Personal information
- Born: March 3, 1941 (age 85); Henderson, North Carolina, U.S.
- Listed height: 6 ft 3 in (1.91 m)
- Listed weight: 195 lb (88 kg)

Career information
- High school: Eastern (Washington, D.C.)
- College: Wisconsin (1963-1964)
- NFL draft: 1964: 6th round, 84th overall pick
- AFL draft: 1964: 25th round, 193rd overall pick

Career history
- Chicago Bears (1965–1967); Denver Broncos (1968)

Awards and highlights
- 2× Second-team All-Big Ten (1963, 1964)

Career NFL/AFL statistics
- Receptions: 69
- Receiving yards: 1,182
- Touchdowns: 11
- Stats at Pro Football Reference

James Clyde Jones (born March 3, 1941) is an American former professional football player who was a wide receiver in the National Football League (NFL) and American Football League (AFL). He played four seasons with the NFL's Chicago Bears (1965–1967) and the AFL's Denver Broncos (1968). He played college football for the Wisconsin Badgers.
