= Bob Lacey (American football) =

American football player (1942–1997)

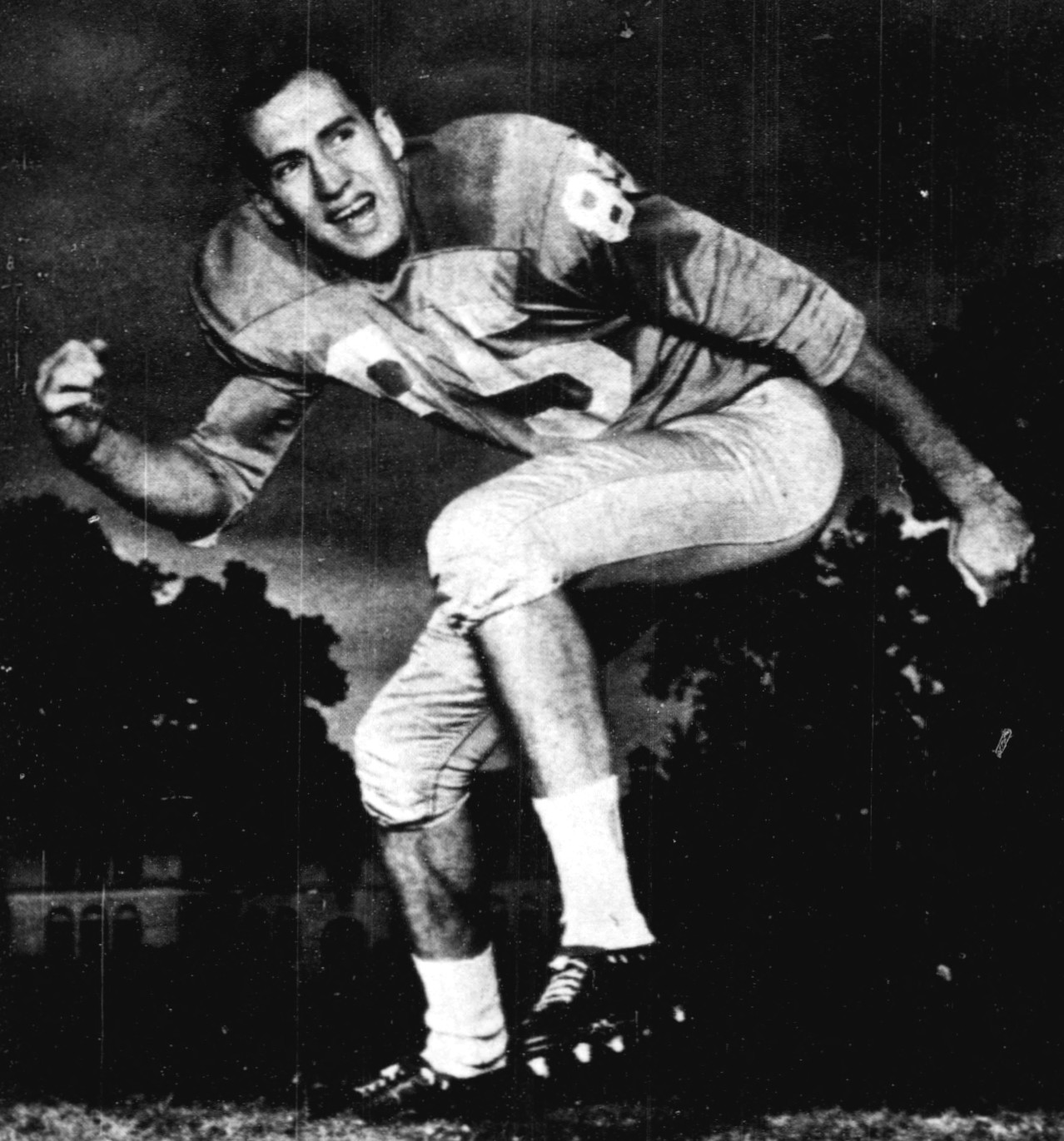
- Lacey, circa 1966

No. 88, 38
- Position: Wide receiver

Personal information
- Born: March 30, 1942; Port Chester, New York, U.S.
- Died: February 15, 1997 (aged 54); Tampa, Florida, U.S.
- Listed height: 6 ft 3 in (1.91 m)
- Listed weight: 205 lb (93 kg)

Career information
- High school: Trinity (Pawling, New York)
- College: North Carolina (1960–1963)
- NFL draft: 1964: 6th round, 75th overall pick
- AFL draft: 1964: 11th round, 83rd overall pick

Career history
- Minnesota Vikings (1964); New York Giants (1965); Brooklyn Dodgers (1966)

Awards and highlights
- 2× First-team All-ACC (1962, 1963)
- Stats at Pro Football Reference

Robert Reavil Lacey (March 30, 1942 – February 15, 1997) was an American professional football player who was a wide receiver one season with the Minnesota Vikings of the National Football League (NFL). He played college football for the North Carolina Tar Heels and was selected by the Vikings in the sixth round of the 1964 NFL draft and the New York Jets in the 11th round of the 1964 AFL draft. He was also a member of the Brooklyn Dodgers of the Continental Football League (COFL).

== Early life ==
Robert Reavil Lacey was born on March 30, 1942, in Port Chester, New York. He attended Trinity-Pawling School in Pawling, New York.

== College career ==
Lacey was a member of the North Carolina Tar Heels of the University of North Carolina at Chapel Hill from 1960 to 1963 and a three-year letterman from 1961 to 1963. He caught ten passes for 161 yards in 1962. He totaled 44 receptions for 668 yards and five touchdowns in 1962, earning Associated Press (AP) and United Press International (UPI) first-team All-Atlantic Coast Conference (ACC) honors. His receiving yards and receiving touchdowns led the ACC that season. As a senior in 1963, Lacey caught 48 passes for 533 yards and one touchdown, garnering AP and UPI first-team All-ACC recognition for the second consecutive season. He also led the ACC in receptions that year.

== Professional career ==
In December 1963, Lacey was selected by the Minnesota Vikings in the sixth round, with the 75th overall pick, of the 1964 NFL draft, and by the New York Jets in the 11th round, with the 83rd overall pick, of the 1964 AFL draft. He signed with the Vikings on December 28, 1963. He played in one game for the Vikings during the 1964 season. He was released on September 7, 1965.

Lacey was signed to the taxi squad of the New York Giants in 1965. He was promoted to the active roster on December 16, 1965, but did not appear in any games for the Giants that year. He became a free agent after the season and re-signed with the Giants on June 11, 1966. Lacey was released on August 2, 1966.

Lacey played in ten games for the Brooklyn Dodgers of the Continental Football League in 1966, totaling 14 receptions for 185 yards and one touchdown.

== Personal life ==
Lacey died on February 15, 1997, in Tampa, Florida.
