= J. R. Williamson =

American football player (1942–2020)

No. 52, 55
- Position: Linebacker

Personal information
- Born: October 9, 1942; El Dorado, Arkansas, U.S.
- Died: July 11, 2020 (aged 77); Houston, Texas, U.S.
- Listed height: 6 ft 2 in (1.88 m)
- Listed weight: 220 lb (100 kg)

Career information
- High school: El Dorado
- College: Louisiana Tech (1960-1963)
- NFL draft: 1964: 8th round, 106th overall pick
- AFL draft: 1964: 9th round, 71st overall pick

Career history
- Oakland Raiders (1964-1967); Boston Patriots (1968-1970)

Awards and highlights
- AFL champion (1967)

Career NFL/AFL statistics
- Fumble recoveries: 2
- Interceptions: 3
- Sacks: 2.5
- Stats at Pro Football Reference

John Robert Williamson (October 9, 1942 – July 11, 2020) was an American professional football player who played as a linebacker for seven seasons for the Oakland Raiders and Boston Patriots.

Williamson died in Houston, Texas on July 11, 2020, at the age of 79.
