= George Seals =

American football player (1942–2022)

No. 71, 67
- Positions: Guard, Offensive tackle, Defensive tackle

Personal information
- Born: October 2, 1942; Higginsville, Missouri, U.S.
- Died: May 6, 2022 (aged 79)
- Listed height: 6 ft 3 in (1.91 m)
- Listed weight: 260 lb (118 kg)

Career information
- High school: Lafayette County (Lafayette County, Missouri)
- College: Missouri
- NFL draft: 1964: 4th round, 52nd overall pick
- AFL draft: 1964: 8th round, 64th overall pick

Career history
- Washington Redskins (1964); Chicago Bears (1965–1971); Kansas City Chiefs (1972–1973)

Awards and highlights
- Second-team All-Pro (1968); First-team All-Big Eight (1963)

Career NFL statistics
- Games played: 134
- Games started: 74
- Fumble recoveries: 4
- Stats at Pro Football Reference

George Edward Seals (October 2, 1942 – May 6, 2022) was an American football offensive and defensive lineman in the National Football League (NFL) for the Washington Redskins, Chicago Bears, and the Kansas City Chiefs.

== Biography ==
Seals was born in Higginsville, Missouri. He played college football at the University of Missouri and was drafted in the fourth round of the 1964 NFL draft by the New York Giants. He was also selected in the eighth round of the 1964 AFL draft by the San Diego Chargers.

In 1971, Seals was recruited by Washington Redskins guard Ray Schoenke to support the 1972 presidential candidacy of Senator George McGovern. He and other pro-McGovern football players such as Schoenke and Buck Buchanan were seen as valuable assets by the campaign because their support challenged voters' perception of McGovern as "soft" and mild-mannered.

His son Dan Seals lost to Mark Kirk in 2006 and 2008 and also lost to Bob Dold in 2010 for the 10th District of Illinois' Congressional seat.
