= Bud Abell =

American football player (born 1940)

No. 52
- Position: Linebacker

Personal information
- Born: December 21, 1940 (age 85); Kansas City, Missouri, U.S.
- Listed height: 6 ft 3 in (1.91 m)
- Listed weight: 220 lb (100 kg)

Career information
- High school: Southeast (Kansas City)
- College: Missouri
- NFL draft: 1964: 17th round, 228th overall pick
- AFL draft: 1964: 23rd round, 178th overall pick

Career history
- Kansas City Chiefs (1965–1968); Denver Broncos (1969)*
- * Offseason or practice squad member only

Awards and highlights
- AFL champion (1966)

Career NFL statistics
- Games played: 40
- Interceptions: 2
- Fumble recoveries: 3
- Touchdowns: 3
- Stats at Pro Football Reference

Harry Everett "Bud" Abell (born December 21, 1940) is an American former professional football player who was a linebacker in the American Football League (AFL) for the Kansas City Chiefs. He played college football at the University of Missouri.

== Early life ==
Abell was born in Kansas City, Missouri and attended Southeast High School. He was known as "Bud" from his boyhood years since his father shared the same first name.

He accepted a football scholarship from the University of Missouri. As a sophomore, he became a starter at right defensive end. He was a two-way player and also was an offensive end.

Abell graduated with a Bachelor of Science degree from University of Missouri in 1966.

== Professional career ==
Abell was selected by the Kansas City Chiefs in the 23rd round (178th overall) of the 1964 AFL draft with a future draft pick, which allowed the team to draft him before his college eligibility was over. He was also selected by the Dallas Cowboys in the 17th round (228th overall) of the 1964 NFL draft.

On June 1, 1965, he signed with the Kansas City Chiefs. He was converted into an outside linebacker during training camp. On September 2, the Chiefs claimed rookie Chuck Hurston, placing Abell on the injury deferred list to make room for him.

In 1966, he participated in his first regular season as a part of the team that won the AFL Championship and that played in Super Bowl I. The next year, he became a starter after E. J. Holub was injured.

In 1968, he returned to a reserve role after he was passed on the depth chart by rookie Jim Lynch. That season he recorded his only 2 career interceptions.

On August 25, 1969, he was traded to the Denver Broncos in exchange for a conditional draft choice (not exercised). He was released by the Broncos on September 9.
