= Jim Evans (wide receiver) =

American football player (born 1939)

No. 80
- Position: Wide receiver

Personal information
- Born: October 24, 1939 (age 87); Big Spring, Texas, U.S.
- Listed height: 6 ft 1 in (1.85 m)
- Listed weight: 190 lb (86 kg)

Career information
- High school: Big Spring
- College: Texas Western (1961-1963)
- NFL draft: 1964: 6th round, 83rd overall pick
- AFL draft: 1964: 4th round, 27th overall pick

Career history
- Dallas Cowboys (1964)*; New York Jets (1964–1965); Buffalo Bills (1966)*
- * Offseason or practice squad member only

Career AFL statistics
- Receptions: 9
- Receiving yards: 80
- Return yards: 259
- Stats at Pro Football Reference

James Evans (born October 24, 1939) is an American former professional football player who was a wide receiver for the New York Jets of the American Football League (AFL). He played college football for the Texas Western Miners (now UTEP).

== Early life ==
Evans attended Big Spring High School, before moving on to Howard College. He transferred to Texas Western University after his freshman season.

As a sophomore, he was a backup running back. The next year he was converted into a flanker, leading the team with 21 receptions for 242 yards, while playing in a run-oriented offense.

As a senior, he posted 36 receptions for 480 yards and 2 touchdowns, including 131 receiving yards against North Texas University, which at the time was the third best single-game mark in school history.

== Professional career ==
=== Dallas Cowboys ===
Evans was selected by the Dallas Cowboys in the sixth round (83rd overall) of the 1964 NFL draft and by the New York Jets in the fourth round (27th overall) of the 1964 AFL draft. He chose to sign with the Cowboys but was waived on September 7.

=== New York Jets ===
In 1964, he was signed by the New York Jets to their taxi squad. After he recovered from a cut hand suffered in an automobile accident, he was promoted to the active roster on October 2 to replace flanker Alphonzo Lawson. He was a backup (12 games with one start) playing mainly on special teams, while leading the team in kickoff returns (13 for 259 yards).

In 1965, he played in nine games before suffering a separated shoulder and being placed on the taxi squad on October 29. He was promoted to the active roster later in the season. He was cut on August 8, 1966.

=== Buffalo Bills ===
In 1966, he was claimed off waivers by the Buffalo Bills, but was released one week later on August 16.
