= Gene Donaldson =

American gridiron football player (1942–2002)

No. 35, 72, 34
- Position: Running back

Personal information
- Born: November 4, 1942; Birmingham, Alabama, U.S.
- Died: September 7, 2002 (aged 59)
- Listed height: 6 ft 2 in (1.88 m)
- Listed weight: 230 lb (104 kg)

Career information
- College: Purdue (1960-1963)
- NFL draft: 1964: 11th round, 143rd overall pick

Career history
- Richmond Rebels (1965); Toronto Argonauts (1966); Hamilton Tiger-Cats (1967); Buffalo Bills (1967)

Awards and highlights
- Grey Cup champion (1967)

Career AFL statistics
- Receptions: 1
- Receiving yards: 20
- Stats at Pro Football Reference

Eugene Harold Donaldson (November 4, 1942 – September 7, 2002) was a Canadian and American football player who played for the Toronto Argonauts, Buffalo Bills and Hamilton Tiger-Cats. He won the Grey Cup with Hamilton in 1967. He previously played college football at Purdue University and was selected in the 1964 NFL draft by the Washington Redskins (Round 11, #143 overall).
