= Glen Condren =

American football player (born 1942)

- Condren in 1972

No. 83, 70, 88
- Position: Defensive lineman

Personal information
- Born: June 10, 1942 (age 84); Fort Smith, Arkansas, U.S.
- Listed height: 6 ft 4 in (1.93 m)
- Listed weight: 251 lb (114 kg)

Career information
- College: Oklahoma
- NFL draft: 1964: 11th round, 152nd overall pick
- AFL draft: 1964: 19th round, 147th overall pick

Career history
- New York Giants (1965–1967); Atlanta Falcons (1969–1972)

Career NFL statistics
- Games played: 79
- Starts: 59
- Sacks: 12.5 (Unofficial)
- Fumble recoveries: 2
- Stats at Pro Football Reference

Glen Paige Condren (born June 10, 1942) is an American former professional football player who was a defensive lineman in the National Football League (NFL). He played college football for the Oklahoma Sooners. Condren was selected in both the 1964 NFL draft by the New York Giants in the 11th round, with the Giants picking him as a "future" for the 1965 season, as well as in the 1964 AFL draft by the New York Jets in the 19th round.

Condren signed with the Giants and played three seasons in New York, from 1965 to 1967. He suffered a knee injury during his rookie season and only saw action in 8 games before being sent home to rehabilitate. He was waived by the Giants ahead of the 1968 NFL season and claimed by the fledgling Atlanta Falcons, who sent him to play with a minor league affiliate in Huntsville, Alabama, the Alabama Hawks of the Continental Football League.

In 1969 Condren made the Falcons' regular season roster, working into the starting lineup for 1970 and 1971.

Condren is married and the father of four children.
