= Jim McNaughton =

American gridiron football player (born 1942)

Profile
- Position: Tight end

Personal information
- Born: January 14, 1942 (age 84); Vernal, Utah, U.S.
- Listed height: 6 ft 2 in (1.88 m)
- Listed weight: 215 lb (98 kg)

Career information
- NFL draft: 1964: 12th round, 165th overall pick
- AFL draft: 1964: 17th round, 129th overall pick

Career history
- 1964: Saskatchewan Roughriders
- 1964: BC Lions

Awards and highlights
- Grey Cup champion (1964)

Jim McNaughton (born January 14, 1942) is an American former professional football player who played for the BC Lions and Saskatchewan Roughriders. He won the Grey Cup with the Lions in 1964. He played college football at the Utah State University.
