= Sammy Odom =

American football player (1941–2001)

No. 52
- Position: Defensive tackle

Personal information
- Born: November 13, 1941; Shreveport, Louisiana, U.S.
- Died: January 18, 2001 (aged 59); Mansfield, Louisiana, U.S.
- Listed height: 6 ft 2 in (1.88 m)
- Listed weight: 235 lb (107 kg)

Career information
- High school: Minden (Minden, Louisiana)
- College: Northwestern State (1962-1963)
- NFL draft: 1964: 7th round, 95th overall pick
- AFL draft: 1964: 10th round, 78th overall pick

Career history
- Houston Oilers (1964); Richmond Rebels (1965)

Career AFL statistics
- Interceptions: 2
- Sacks: 1
- Stats at Pro Football Reference

Sammy Joe Odom (November 13, 1941 - January 18, 2001) was an American professional football player who played for the Houston Oilers in 1964.

Odom was born November 13, 1941, in Shreveport, Louisiana, and attended Minden High School in Minden, Louisiana, and then Northwestern State University, playing for the Northwestern State Demons football as a linebacker/defensive tackle in the Gulf States Conference. He was drafted in the seventh round of the 1964 NFL draft with pick 95 by the Cleveland Browns and pick 78 in the tenth round of the 1964 AFL draft by the Houston Oilers He opted to go to the Oilers and played fourteen games as a defensive tackle with the Oilers in 1964, making two interceptions for 22 yards. The following year he moved to the Richmond Rebels, as part of their inaugural team playing in the newly established Continental Football League. He did not play a game for the team and was delisted.

Odom died on January 18, 2001, in Mansfield, Louisiana.
