= Ozzie Clay =

American football player (1941–2005)

No. 28, 27
- Position: Wide receiver

Personal information
- Born: September 10, 1941; Hickory, North Carolina, U.S.
- Died: March 8, 2005 (aged 63); Washington, D.C., U.S.
- Listed height: 6 ft 0 in (1.83 m)
- Listed weight: 190 lb (86 kg)

Career information
- High school: Ridgeview (Hickory)
- College: Iowa State (1960–1963)
- NFL draft: 1964: 17th round, 227th overall pick

Career history
- Washington Redskins (1964); Richmond Rebels (1965); St. Louis Cardinals (1966)*
- * Offseason or practice squad member only

Career NFL statistics
- Return yards: 487
- Stats at Pro Football Reference

Ozzie B. Clay (September 10, 1941 – March 8, 2005) was an American football safety who played professionally in the National Football League (NFL) for the Washington Redskins. He played college football at Iowa State University and was selected in the 17th round of the 1964 NFL draft. Clay died on March 8, 2005, at Washington Hospital Center in Washington, D.C.
