= Gary Lewis (running back) =

American football player (1942–1986)

No. 22
- Positions: Fullback, Running back

Personal information
- Born: February 22, 1942; New Orleans, Louisiana, U.S.
- Died: December 12, 1986 (aged 44); Daly City, California, U.S.
- Listed height: 6 ft 3 in (1.91 m)
- Listed weight: 225 lb (102 kg)

Career information
- High school: San Francisco (CA) Poly
- College: Washington State (1961); Arizona State (1963)
- NFL draft: 1964: 6th round, 71st overall pick
- AFL draft: 1964: 22nd round, 169th overall pick

Career history
- San Francisco 49ers (1964); Joliet Chargers (1964); San Francisco 49ers (1965–1969); New Orleans Saints (1970)

Career NFL statistics
- Rushing yards: 1,421
- Rushing average: 4.1
- Receptions: 72
- Receiving yards: 604
- Total touchdowns: 18
- Stats at Pro Football Reference

Gary Roger Lewis (February 22, 1942 – December 12, 1986) was an American professional football running back in the National Football League (NFL). He played seven seasons for the San Francisco 49ers from 1964 to 1969 and New Orleans Saints in 1970.

Lewis was one of three 1964 San Francisco 49ers teammates who died of amyotrophic lateral sclerosis (ALS), also known as Lou Gehrig's disease, a rare ailment with an incidence estimated at 1 per 50,000 individuals in the general population. Others 49ers stricken by the disease included contemporaries Bob Waters and Matt Hazeltine and — a generation later — wide receiver Dwight Clark.

Studies have been done examining the use of DMSO, painkillers, and the fertilizer used on the 49ers practice field in Redwood City, California in an effort to isolate a potential chemical connection. A possible connection between the disease and mild traumatic brain injury (concussion) is a matter of ongoing study.
