= Rudy Johnson =

American football player (born 1941)

No. 32
- Position: Halfback

Personal information
- Born: July 10, 1941 (age 85); Houston, Texas, U.S.
- Listed height: 5 ft 11 in (1.80 m)
- Listed weight: 190 lb (86 kg)

Career information
- High school: Aransas Pass (TX)
- College: Nebraska (1960-1963)
- NFL draft: 1964: 5th round, 57th overall pick
- AFL draft: 1964: 12th round, 91st overall pick

Career history
- San Francisco 49ers (1964–1965); Atlanta Falcons (1966)

Awards and highlights
- Second-team All-Big Eight (1963)

Career NFL statistics
- Rushing yards: 60
- Rushing average: 2.4
- Receptions: 8
- Receiving yards: 70
- Total touchdowns: 1
- Stats at Pro Football Reference

Rudolph “Speedy” Johnson (born July 10, 1941) is an American former professional football player who was a halfback for the San Francisco 49ers and Atlanta Falcons of the National Football League (NFL). He played college football for the Nebraska Cornhuskers. He scored one touchdown in his NFL career on a four-yard carry in Week 10 of the 1964 season.
