= J.D. Garrett =

American football player (1941–2012)

No. 32
- Position: Halfback

Personal information
- Born: November 28, 1941; Natchitoches, Louisiana, U.S.
- Died: July 4, 2012 (aged 70); Natchitoches, Louisiana, U.S.
- Listed height: 5 ft 11 in (1.80 m)
- Listed weight: 195 lb (88 kg)

Career information
- High school: Natchitoches Central (LA)
- College: Grambling State (1960-1963)
- NFL draft: 1964: 18th round, 249th overall pick
- AFL draft: 1964: 8th round, 60th overall pick

Career history
- Boston Patriots (1964-1967)

Career AFL statistics
- Rushing yards: 434
- Rushing average: 3.7
- Receptions: 17
- Receiving yards: 169
- Total touchdowns: 6
- Stats at Pro Football Reference

John D. Garrett (November 28, 1941 – July 4, 2012) was an American professional football halfback. He played for the Boston Patriots from 1964 to 1967. He spent decades coaching football and track at Natchitoches Central High School, his alma mater. He also taught thousands of Natchitoches youth to swim as a swim instructor at the city's local pools.
