= 1963 All-Atlantic Coast Conference football team =

American college football all-star team

The 1963 All-Atlantic Coast Conference football team consists of American football players chosen by various selectors for their All-Atlantic Coast Conference ("ACC") teams for the 1963 NCAA University Division football season. Selectors in 1963 included the Associated Press (AP) and the United Press International (UPI). Players who were the consensus first-team selections of both the AP and UPI are displayed in bold.

== All-Atlantic Coast selections ==
=== Ends ===
- **Bob Lacey**, North Carolina (AP-1; UPI-1)
- Don Montgomery, North Carolina State (AP-1; UPI-2)
- Stan Crisson, Duke (UPI-1; AP-2)
- Lou Fogle, Clemson (AP-2)
- Darryl Hill, Maryland (UPI-2)

=== Tackles ===
- **Bert Wilder**, North Carolina State (AP-1; UPI-1)
- **Chuck Walker**, Duke (AP-1; UPI-1)
- Jack Aaron, Clemson (AP-2)
- Bob Kowalkowski, Virginia (AP-2)
- Gene Sigmon, North Carolina (UPI-2)
- Vic Esposito, North Carolina (UPI-2)

=== Guards ===
- Turnley Todd, Virginia (AP-1)
- Tom Gibson, South Carolina (AP-1)
- Bill Sullivan, North Carolina State (UPI-1; AP-2)
- Ray Gibson, Maryland (UPI-1)
- Jerry Cabe, North Carolina (AP-2)
- Billy Weaver, Clemson (UPI-2)
- Fred Cromartie, Duke (UPI-2)

=== Centers ===
- Ted Bunton, Clemson (AP-1; UPI-2)
- Chris Hanburger, North Carolina (UPI-1; AP-2) (Pro Football Hall of Fame)

=== Backs ===
- **Jay Wilkinson**, Duke (AP-1; UPI-1 [halfback])
- **Ken Willard**, North Carolina (AP-1; UPI-1 [halfback])
- **Pat Crain**, Clemson (AP-1; UPI-1 [fullback])
- Jim Rossi, North Carolina State (AP-1; UPI-2 [quarterback])
- Junior Edge, North Carolina (UPI-1; AP-2)
- Scotty Glacken, Duke (AP-2)
- Darryl Hill, Maryland (AP-2)
- Dick Shiner, Maryland (AP-2)
- Tony Koszarsky, North Carolina State (UPI-2)
- Joe Scarpati, North Carolina State (UPI-2)
- Mike Curtis, Duke (UPI-2)

== Key ==
AP = Associated Press

UPI = United Press International

== See also ==
- 1963 College Football All-America Team
