= Lloyd Voss =

American football player (1942–2007)

No. 71, 65
- Positions: Defensive end, Defensive tackle

Personal information
- Born: February 13, 1942; Adrian, Minnesota, U.S.
- Died: March 1, 2007 (aged 65); Pittsburgh, Pennsylvania, U.S.
- Listed height: 6 ft 4 in (1.93 m)
- Listed weight: 256 lb (116 kg)

Career information
- College: Nebraska
- NFL draft: 1964: 1st round, 13th overall pick
- AFL draft: 1964: 2nd round, 11th overall pick

Career history
- Green Bay Packers (1964–1965); Pittsburgh Steelers (1966–1971); Denver Broncos (1972)

Awards and highlights
- NFL champion (1965); First-team All-Big Eight (1963)

Career NFL statistics
- Fumble recoveries: 4
- Interceptions: 1
- Sacks: 24.5
- Stats at Pro Football Reference

Lloyd John Voss (February 13, 1942 — March 1, 2007) was an American football defensive end. He was drafted in the first round by the Green Bay Packers in the 1964 NFL draft. He played most of his career with the Pittsburgh Steelers.

Voss reportedly died of liver and kidney failure.

== Pro career ==
After graduating from Nebraska, Lloyd Voss was drafted by the New York Jets in the second round of the 1964 AFL draft, the 11th overall pick. Voss had also been the first round selected (13th overall]] by the Green Bay Packers in the 1964 NFL draft. Voss opted to sign with the Packers.

Voss only appeared in two games over two seasons for the Packers, but was a member of the 1965 team that defeated the Cleveland Browns for the NFL Championship. After the 1965 season, Voss was acquired via trade by the Pittsburgh Steelers, where he finally earned a starting position. From 1966-1971, Voss was the starter for the bulk of those seasons, netting his first interception in a game in 1967. Though those Steelers teams under Bill Austin rarely were competitive, Voss established himself as a team leader. Voss' former teammate and roommate Andy Russell, who'd be part of the Steelers dynasty in the next decade, credited Voss as a team leader who always was there with advice. During his final years in Pittsburgh, Voss served as a mentor to Joe Greene and L.C. Greenwood. Voss would play one season for the Denver Broncos before retiring. However, he would make a comeback a few years later, playing for the New York Stars and Charlotte Hornets of the ill-fated World Football League.

== Personal life ==
Lloyd Voss was married twice and had three children, a son named Thomas, and two daughters, Sue and Kristin. In 1996, Voss was inducted into the Nebraska Cornhusker Hall Of Fame. After a prolonged illness, Lloyd Voss died from Liver and Kidney failure.
