= Bob Hohn =

American football player (1941–2003)

No. 29
- Position: Cornerback

Personal information
- Born: June 4, 1941; Beatrice, Nebraska, U.S.
- Died: November 27, 2003 (aged 62)
- Listed height: 6 ft 0 in (1.83 m)
- Listed weight: 185 lb (84 kg)

Career information
- High school: Beatrice
- College: Nebraska (1961-1964)
- NFL draft: 1964: 20th round, 273rd overall pick
- AFL draft: 1964: 20th round, 154th overall pick

Career history
- Pittsburgh Steelers (1965–1969)

Awards and highlights
- Second-team All-Big Eight (1964)

Career NFL statistics
- Interceptions: 7
- Fumble recoveries: 5
- Stats at Pro Football Reference

Robert Huber Hohn (June 4, 1941 – November 27, 2003) was an American professional football player who was a defensive back for four seasons for the Pittsburgh Steelers. Hohn played college football at the University of Nebraska and was selected in the 20th round of the 1964 NFL draft by the Los Angeles Rams.
