= George Bednar =

American-football player (1942–2007)

Profile
- Positions: Guard, tackle

Personal information
- Born: March 16, 1942; Kingston, Pennsylvania, U.S.
- Died: December 6, 2007 (aged 65); Roxbury, Connecticut, U.S.
- Listed height: 6 ft 3 in (1.91 m)
- Listed weight: 240 lb (109 kg)

Career information
- High school: Central Catholic (Kingston)
- College: Notre Dame
- NFL draft: 1964: 8th round, 104th overall pick
- AFL draft: 1964: 3rd round, 23rd overall pick

Career history
- St. Louis Cardinals (1964)*
- * Offseason or practice squad member only

George John Bednar (March 16, 1942 – December 6, 2007) was an American college football player for the University of Notre Dame, who later became as a business executive. He is most well known for his tenure as a marketing executive for McKesson Imports Company, where he was instrumental in popularizing the Harvey Wallbanger cocktail.

== Early life and education ==
Bednar was born in Kingston, Pennsylvania, and attended Central Catholic High School in Kingston (now amalgamated with Holy Redeemer High School in Wilkes-Barre). He graduated from Central Catholic in 1960, after achieving success as a high school football player.

He then attended the University of Notre Dame in South Bend, Indiana, where he played offensive guard and defensive tackle for coach Joe Kuharich's Notre Dame Fighting Irish football team from 1960 to 1963. After completing his college career, Bednar played in the Blue-Grey All-Star Game and the College All-Star Game. Bednar graduated from the University of Notre Dame in 1964 with a Bachelor of Arts in economics, and married.

== NFL draft ==
Bednar was selected by the St. Louis Cardinals of the National Football League in the eighth round of the 1964 NFL draft. Although he signed with Cardinals, he never played in a regular season NFL game.

== Executive career ==
Bednar became the marketing/sales director for McKesson Imports Company. Bednar marketed the Harvey Wallbanger cocktail in the early 1970s by suggesting bartenders on America's West Coast promote the cocktail. During this time, McKesson hired graphic artist Bill Young to develop a "Harvey Wallbanger" character to market the drink, which tends to negate the attribution of the drink and its name to bartender Donatao "Duke" Antone. Various authors have speculated that Bednar may have commissioned recipe for the drink itself from Antone, or developed it internally.

The drink is composed of vodka, orange juice and Galliano liqueur, then a product of McKesson Imports. Sales of Galliano quadrupled after Bednar helped develop the Wallbanger character and tagline "Harvey Wallbanger is the name... And I can be made!"

Building on his success at McKesson, Bednar later became an entrepreneur. He founded International Marketing Group, Inc. in 1976 to provide marketing consulting services to the wine and spirits industry, and creating promotions for Bacardi, Stolichnaya, and Johnny Walker.

In the early 1980s, Bednar and business partner Anthony Wright founded Promotion Systems, Inc. to provide promotion and marketing consulting services to broader companies, such as Johnson & Johnson, Playtex and Seagrams. In 2004, Bednar founded SunCalc, Ltd., which marketed sunlight measuring devices to home gardeners.

== Personal interests ==
Bednar was a shooting sports enthusiast in later life. In 1981, Bednar bought the Sandanona Shooting Preserve in Millbrook, New York, the oldest private shooting preserve in the United States. Bednar built a premier shooting school on the premises as well as a sporting clays course. A top-tier sporting clays competitor, Bednar also served on the board of directors of the Sporting Clays Association of America.

== Family life and death ==
In 1964, Bednar married his wife Francis. They had three children. At the time of his death from a prolonged illness in 2007, he had eight grandchildren.
