= Roger LaLonde =

Canadian and American football player (born 1942)

No. 65, 78, 67
- Position: Defensive tackle

Personal information
- Born: January 6, 1942 (age 84); Antwerp, New York, U.S.
- Listed height: 6 ft 3 in (1.91 m)
- Listed weight: 255 lb (116 kg)

Career information
- High school: Van Wert (Van Wert, Ohio)
- College: Muskingum (1960-1963)
- NFL draft: 1964: 15th round, 201st overall pick
- AFL draft: 1964: 8th round, 61st overall pick

Career history
- Detroit Lions (1964); New York Giants (1965); Montreal Alouettes (1966); Montreal Beavers (1967); Hamilton Tiger-Cats (1967)

Awards and highlights
- Grey Cup champion (1967)

Career NFL statistics
- Sacks: 1
- Stats at Pro Football Reference

Roger LaLonde (born January 6, 1942) is an American former professional football player who played for the Detroit Lions, New York Giants, Montreal Alouettes and Hamilton Tiger-Cats. He won the Grey Cup with Hamilton in 1967. He previously played college football at Muskingum University in New Concord, Ohio. LaLonde was selected in the 1964 NFL draft by the Lions (Round 15, #201 overall). He was also picked in the 1964 AFL draft by the Boston Patriots (Round 8, #61 overall).
