= Bert Wilder =

American football player (1939–2012)

No. 82
- Positions: Defensive end, Defensive tackle

Personal information
- Born: April 14, 1939; Greensboro, North Carolina, U.S.
- Died: December 5, 2012 (aged 73); Greensboro, North Carolina, U.S.
- Listed height: 6 ft 3 in (1.91 m)
- Listed weight: 245 lb (111 kg)

Career information
- High school: Greensboro (NC)
- College: North Carolina State
- NFL draft: 1962: 11th round, 143rd overall pick
- AFL draft: 1962: 14th round, 109th overall pick

Career history
- New York Jets (1964–1967)

Awards and highlights
- First-team All-ACC (1963)

Career AFL statistics
- Games played: 55
- Games started: 13
- Sacks: 4
- Stats at Pro Football Reference

Albert Green Wilder (April 14, 1939 – December 5, 2012) was an American football defensive end who played for four seasons for the New York Jets in the American Football League (AFL).

Wilder attended Greensboro High School (now known as Grimsley High School) in Greensboro, North Carolina. He was a three-sport athlete in football, wrestling, and track. In football, his team finished as the 1956 NCHSAA Class AAA state co-champions, after tying in the championship game. He also earned All-State and All-American honors as a lineman in football. In wrestling, he was a two-time state champion at heavyweight, and in track, he was a state champion in the shot put his senior year.

He played college football under coach Earle Edwards at NC State. Wilder was named All-ACC as a senior in 1963. Following college, he played four seasons for the New York Jets in the American Football League.
