= Joe Scarpati =

American football player (born 1943)

No. 21
- Position: Safety

Personal information
- Born: March 5, 1943 (age 83); Brooklyn, New York, U.S.
- Listed height: 5 ft 10 in (1.78 m)
- Listed weight: 185 lb (84 kg)

Career information
- High school: Scotch Plains-Fanwood
- College: North Carolina State
- AFL draft: 1964: 13th round, 100th overall pick

Career history
- Green Bay Packers (1964)*; Minnesota Vikings (1964)*; Philadelphia Eagles (1964–1969); New Orleans Saints (1970); Philadelphia Eagles (1971)*
- * Offseason or practice squad member only

Awards and highlights
- 2× Second-team All-ACC (1962, 1963)

Career statistics
- Games played: 96
- Interceptions: 25
- Touchdowns: 3
- Stats at Pro Football Reference

Joseph Henry Scarpati Jr. (born March 5, 1943) is an American former professional football player who was a safety for seven seasons with the Philadelphia Eagles and New Orleans Saints of the National Football League (NFL). He played college football for the NC State Wolfpack

Scarpati was first drafted by the Boston Patriots but instead chose to sign with Vince Lombardi's Green Bay Packers. He was released during the exhibition games and signed with the Minnesota Vikings, but was released a few days later. He then signed with the Philadelphia Eagles, where he would spend the next six seasons of his career. In 1970, he spent the season with the New Orleans Saints, and was the holder for Tom Dempsey's record breaking 63-yard field goal. He attempted to return for an eighth season back with the Eagles but suffered an injury in training camp and retired shortly afterwards.

== Early life ==
Scarpati was born on March 5, 1943, in Brooklyn, New York. He was raised in Scotch Plains, New Jersey, and attended Scotch Plains-Fanwood High School. His high school coach Chuck Nelson described him as "a boy who comes up once in 25 years." He was an all-around player in high school, excelling a center, halfback, and cornerback. A 1958 newspaper article described him as "like a cat on defense. Wherever the play goes, Joe's there. You rarely get a pass by him. If it's near Joe, it's as good as intercepted."

== College career ==
Scarpati was recruited to the NC State Wolfpack football team by Pat Peppler, who would recruit him into the National Football League (NFL) as well. He played and lettered from '61 to '63. In 1961, he appeared in all 10 games while recording 43 attempts for 164 yards and 1 touchdown. He also amassed 14 catches for 150 yards and 2 scores. In the ACC, he placed 9th in Touchdowns, 9th in points, and 5th in receiving touchdowns. Scarpati gained All-ACC honors in each year that he played. He recorded 62 rushes for 210 yards the following year, and scored two touchdowns. He was named the team captain in 1963 after leading the Wolfpack in receiving, scoring, and punt returns. As team captain in his senior year, Scarpati had 49 rushes for 137 yards and two touchdowns. He had more of a receiving role his senior year, with 24 receptions for 273 yards and two scores. He placed 4th in the ACC for yards per catch in '63.

== Professional career ==
=== Green Bay Packers and Minnesota Vikings ===
In the 1964 AFL draft, he was selected by the Boston Patriots (13th round, 100th pick) but chose Vince Lombardi's Green Bay Packers instead. The Packers' Personnel Director Pat Peppler recruited him. He stayed in training camp before being released in pre-season. He then signed with the rival Minnesota Vikings, however, he was released a few days later.

=== Philadelphia Eagles ===
After being released by Minnesota, he was signed to replace an injured Philadelphia Eagles defensive back. Pro Bowl receiver Pete Retzlaff later recalled Scarpati's first practice with the team. He stated "When I took a look at his size (5'10, 185), my first reaction was 'This will be easy,' then when I ran against him, I found out that I couldn't get rid of him." In his rookie season, he played in 12 out of 14 games and collected three interceptions. One of which he returned for a 24-yard touchdown. He started in 11 of those games, and also recorded a fumble recovery and punt return.

He started all 14 games the next year and also recorded his only career offensive touch, a 6-yard rush. He had 3 interceptions during the season, returned for 4 yards.

Scarpati had his best season the following year, leading the league in interception return yards with 182 on 8 returns. He made appearances in all 14 games in '66. In a game against the Dallas Cowboys, he stripped the ball from Dan Reeves on the Eagles 13 yard line to prevent the Cowboys from taking the lead late and winning the game.

He would start all but 2 games in the next three seasons and recorded 10 interceptions, two of which were touchdowns. In '68, he had two pass attempts.

After a knee operation in '69, Scarpati returned and made four interceptions, including one returned for a touchdown.

=== New Orleans Saints ===
In 1970, Scarpati was traded to the New Orleans Saints for guard Norman Davis and safety Bo Burris. With the Saints he played in 14 games, starting 10, and had 1 interception. He was part of a historic play when he was the holder for a record-breaking 63-yard field goal by Tom Dempsey.

=== Return to Philadelphia ===
He attempted to return for an eighth season with Philadelphia in 1971, but suffered an injury in training camp and retired shortly afterwards.

=== Media reference ===
Scarpati is mentioned in the book The Packer Tapes, by Green Bay Packers trainer Dominic Gentile. Scarpati showed well in 1964 training camp but the team was loaded with elite defensive backs, including future Hall of Famers Herb Adderly and Willie Wood. After being cut, Scarpati went to the practice field and appealed to coach Lombardi for another chance; he was told sorry but no. Scarpati tearfully shook his hand and left. The coach told Gentile, "That's the toughest part of this job. I could've kept him on the taxi squad, but with his ability, he should be playing somewhere." Gentile then wrote that Scarpati went on to a successful career, mentioning his part in Dempsey's record field goal.
