= Carleton Oats =

American football player (born 1942)

No. 85, 73
- Positions: Defensive tackle, Defensive end

Personal information
- Born: April 24, 1942 (age 84); Polkinghorne Village, Florida, U.S.
- Listed height: 6 ft 3 in (1.91 m)
- Listed weight: 260 lb (118 kg)

Career information
- High school: Middleton (Tampa, Florida)
- College: Florida A&M
- NFL draft: 1964: 16th round, 215th overall pick
- AFL draft: 1964: 21st round, 167th overall pick

Career history
- Oakland Raiders (1965–1972); Green Bay Packers (1973); Southern California Sun (1974)

Awards and highlights
- AFL champion (1967)

Career NFL/AFL statistics
- Fumble recoveries: 3
- Touchdowns: 1
- Sacks: 19
- Stats at Pro Football Reference

Carleton Oats (born April 24, 1942) is an American former professional football player who was a defensive lineman in the American Football League (AFL), National Football League (NFL), and World Football League (WFL). He played college football for the Florida A&M Rattlers. Oats played professionally for the Oakland Raiders (1965–1972), Green Bay Packers (1973) and Southern California Sun (1974).
