= Bob Kowalkowski =

American football player (1943–2009)

No. 66, 67
- Position: Guard

Personal information
- Born: November 5, 1943; Drexel Hill, Pennsylvania, U.S.
- Died: September 17, 2009 (aged 65); Detroit, Michigan, U.S.
- Listed height: 6 ft 3 in (1.91 m)
- Listed weight: 240 lb (109 kg)

Career information
- High school: Arnold (Arnold, Pennsylvania)
- College: Virginia (1962–1965)
- NFL draft: 1965: 7th round, 95th overall pick
- AFL draft: 1965: Red Shirt 2nd round, 15th overall pick

Career history
- Detroit Lions (1966–1976); Cleveland Browns (1977)*; Green Bay Packers (1977)
- * Offseason or practice squad member only

Awards and highlights
- 2× Second-team All-ACC (1963, 1964)

Career NFL statistics
- Games played: 142
- Games started: 102
- Fumble recoveries: 3
- Stats at Pro Football Reference

Robert Kowalkowski (November 5, 1943 – September 17, 2009) was an American professional football offensive guard who played for the Detroit Lions and the Green Bay Packers in a twelve-year career that lasted from 1966 to 1977 in the National Football League (NFL).

Kowalkowski played college football at the University of Virginia and was drafted in the fifth round of the 1965 NFL draft by the Lions. His son Scott was selected in the 1991 NFL draft by the Philadelphia Eagles and also played with the Lions.
