= Ken Kortas =

American football player (1942–2022)

No. 74, 75, 70
- Position: Defensive tackle

Personal information
- Born: May 17, 1942; Chicago, Illinois, U.S.
- Died: October 15, 2022 (aged 80); Louisville, Kentucky, U.S.
- Listed height: 6 ft 4 in (1.93 m)
- Listed weight: 280 lb (127 kg)

Career information
- High school: Chicago (IL) Taft
- College: Louisville
- NFL draft: 1964: 1st round, 9th overall pick
- AFL draft: 1964: 3rd round, 18th overall pick

Career history
- St. Louis Cardinals (1964); Pittsburgh Steelers (1965–1968); New Orleans Saints (1969)*; Chicago Bears (1969); Washington Redskins (1970)*
- * Offseason or practice squad member only

Awards and highlights
- First-team All-American (1963)

Career NFL statistics
- Fumble recoveries: 4
- Touchdowns: 1
- Sacks: 14.5
- Stats at Pro Football Reference

Kenneth Conrad Kortas (May 17, 1942 – October 15, 2022) was an American professional football player who was a defensive tackle for six seasons in the National Football League (NFL). He played for the St. Louis Cardinals, the Pittsburgh Steelers, and the Chicago Bears from 1964 to 1969.

== Early life ==
Kortas was born in Chicago, Illinois, United States, on May 17, 1942. He attended Taft High School in his hometown. He then studied at the University of Louisville, graduating with a Bachelor of Science in 1963. There, he played football for the Louisville Cardinals and received All-American honors. He was selected by the Kansas City Chiefs in the third round (18th overall) of the 1964 American Football League draft, but did not sign. He was also selected by the St. Louis Cardinals in the first round (ninth overall) of the 1964 NFL draft, becoming the sixth player from Louisville to be drafted in the NFL. At the time of his death, Kortas was the highest NFL draft selection from the university.

== Professional career ==
During his 1964 rookie season, Kortas played in 14 games (5 starts) and was credited with 0.5 sacks. He was traded to the Pittsburgh Steelers on February 17, 1965, in exchange for Terry Nofsinger. He recorded 2 fumble recoveries and 2 sacks in 14 games (10 starts) in his first season with the franchise, before registering a career-high 7 sacks the following year. In the 1967 season, he started all 14 games as he was tied for the league lead in fumble return touchdowns (1), along with 3.5 sacks and 5 fumble return yards. He played one more season with the Steelers, and was traded to the Chicago Bears two weeks before the start of the 1969 season, having been displaced as defensive tackle by new coach Chuck Noll in favor of Joe Greene.

Kortas played just three games with the Bears, before retiring from professional football in 1970. He was inducted into Louisville's Athletics Hall of Fame in 1979.

== Personal life ==
Kortas was married to Judith Ann Kortas for 33 years until his death. Together, they had one daughter. Kortas speculated in futures exchanges during his playing career and lost money speculating on hog futures after the 1965 season. He resided in suburban Louisville, Kentucky, during his later years.

Kortas died on October 15, 2022, at the Norton Brownsboro Hospital in Louisville. He was 80 years old.
