= Pat Crain =

American football player

Profile
- Position: Fullback

Personal information
- Born: c.1942 Latrobe, Pennsylvania, U.S.
- Listed height: 6 ft 4 in (1.93 m)

Career information
- College: Clemson
- NFL draft: 1964: 2nd round, 23rd overall pick
- AFL draft: 1964: 15th round, 118th overall pick

Career history
- Chicago Bears (1964–1965)*
- * Offseason or practice squad member only

Awards and highlights
- First-team All-ACC (1963)

Patrick (Pat) Crain is a former American football fullback. He was drafted by the Chicago Bears in the second round of the 1964 NFL draft. He played college football at Clemson where he played fullback. Some highlights of Crain's career include being selected to the 1963 all ACC team and being the only player in Clemson history to record a reception and an interception in a game until Justin Miller did it in 2002.
