= Steve Wright (American football, born 1942) =

American football player (1942–2025)

No. 72, 78, 75, 73, 62
- Position: Offensive tackle

Personal information
- Born: July 18, 1942; Birmingham, Alabama, U.S.
- Died: June 1, 2025 (aged 82); Augusta, Georgia, U.S.
- Listed height: 6 ft 6 in (1.98 m)
- Listed weight: 250 lb (113 kg)

Career information
- High school: Manual (Louisville, Kentucky)
- College: Alabama (1960-1963)
- NFL draft: 1964: 5th round, 69th overall pick
- AFL draft: 1964: 8th round, 59th overall pick

Career history
- Green Bay Packers (1964–1967); New York Giants (1968–1969); Washington Redskins (1970); Chicago Bears (1971); St. Louis Cardinals (1972); Chicago Fire (1974); Chicago Winds (1975)

Awards and highlights
- 2× Super Bowl champion (I, II); 3× NFL champion (1965, 1966, 1967); National champion (1961)

Career NFL statistics
- Games played: 101
- Games started: 43
- Fumble recoveries: 5
- Stats at Pro Football Reference

Stephen Thomas Wright (July 18, 1942 – June 1, 2025) was an American professional football player who was an offensive tackle for five teams in the National Football League (NFL). He also played for the Chicago Fire of the WFL in 1974. Wright played college football for the Alabama Crimson Tide. He never started a game for Alabama, but was selected in the fifth round of the 1964 NFL draft by the Green Bay Packers, as well as the New York Jets in the eighth round of the American Football League draft; although New York offered a blank check, the prospect of playing for Green Bay proved to factor in his decision. Wright started in 43 of 101 games in nine seasons in the NFL.

Wright was the author of I'd Rather be Wright: Memoirs of an Itinerant Tackle (1974, with William Gildea and Kenneth Turan), a fly-on-the wall look at the professional football world of the late 1960s and early 1970s.

In 1969, Wright was the model for the NFL Man of the Year Award (which was changed to honor Walter Payton in 1999), sculpted by Daniel Bennett Schwartz; the award bears Wright's likeness to this day. Wright worked as a salesman for veterinary pharmaceuticals and insurance before retiring, and lived in Augusta, Georgia until his death.

Wright died at a care facility in Augusta on June 1, 2025, at the age of 82.
