= Roger Anderson =

American football player (1942–2018)

No. 73, 78, 79, 71
- Positions: Defensive tackle, Offensive tackle

Personal information
- Born: November 11, 1942; Bedford, Virginia, U.S.
- Died: March 21, 2018 (aged 75); Raleigh, North Carolina, U.S.
- Listed height: 6 ft 5 in (1.96 m)
- Listed weight: 265 lb (120 kg)

Career information
- High school: Oxford (Oxford, North Carolina)
- College: Virginia Union (1960–1963)
- NFL draft: 1964: 7th round, 96th overall pick
- AFL draft: 1964: 7th round, 51st overall pick

Career history
- New York Giants (1964–1965); Montreal Alouettes (1966); New York Giants (1967–1968); Norfolk Neptunes (1970–1971); Florida Blazers (1974)

Career NFL statistics
- Fumble recoveries: 3
- Interceptions: 1
- Sacks: 5.5
- Stats at Pro Football Reference

Roger Cole Anderson (November 11, 1942 – March 21, 2018) was an American football defensive tackle who played four seasons with the New York Giants of the National Football League (NFL). He played college football at Virginia Union. He was drafted by the Giants in the 7th round of the 1964 NFL draft and the San Diego Chargers in the 7th round of the 1964 AFL draft, and chose to sign with the Giants. A two-way player in college, Anderson was the primary right tackle for the Giants in his rookie season. The next season, he switched to defensive tackle and played in eight games. In 1966, after being cut by the Atlanta Falcons, he signed with the Montreal Alouettes of the Canadian Football League (CFL). Anderson returned to the Giants during the 1967 season to play defensive tackle after the team suffered multiple injuries. Later in his career, he played for the Norfolk Neptunes of the Atlantic Coast Football League (ACFL) and the Florida Blazers of the World Football League (WFL).
