= Herschel Turner =

American football player (1942–2025)

No. 63
- Positions: Tackle, Guard

Personal information
- Born: June 17, 1942; Breathitt County, Kentucky, U.S.
- Died: January 18, 2025 (aged 82)
- Listed height: 6 ft 3 in (1.91 m)
- Listed weight: 230 lb (104 kg)

Career information
- High school: Campbell County (Alexandria, Kentucky)
- College: Kentucky
- NFL draft: 1964: 2nd round, 24th overall pick
- AFL draft: 1964: 9th round, 72nd overall pick

Career history
- St. Louis Cardinals (1964–1965); New Orleans Saints (1967)*; Los Angeles Rams (1967)*
- * Offseason or practice squad member only

Awards and highlights
- First-team All-American (1963); First-team All-SEC (1963)

Career NFL statistics
- Games played: 27
- Games started: 5
- Fumble recoveries: 3
- Stats at Pro Football Reference

Herschel Turner (June 17, 1942 – January 18, 2025) was an American professional football player who was a tackle and guard for the St. Louis Cardinals of the National Football League (NFL). He played college football for the Kentucky Wildcats and was named a first-team All-American in 1963. Turner was also named first-team All-Southeastern Conference as a senior and participated in the Blue-Gray Game and the Senior Bowl. He logged the most minutes played on the UK's 1962 squad known as the “Thin Thirty.”

Turner was selected by the St. Louis Cardinals in the second round of the 1964 NFL draft and was the team's rookie of the year. He played in St. Louis for two seasons before a knee injury forced him to retire.

Turner died on January 18, 2025, at the age of 82.
