= Dick Leeuwenburg =

American football player (born 1942)

No. 57
- Position: Offensive tackle

Personal information
- Born: March 26, 1942 (age 84); Salt Lake City, Utah, U.S.
- Listed height: 6 ft 5 in (1.96 m)
- Listed weight: 242 lb (110 kg)

Career information
- High school: Olympus (Holladay, Utah)
- College: Stanford (1960–1964)
- NFL draft: 1964: 11th round, 154th overall pick

Career history
- Chicago Bears (1965)
- Stats at Pro Football Reference

Richard Peter Leeuwenburg (born March 26, 1942) is an American former professional football offensive tackle who played for the Chicago Bears of the National Football League (NFL). He played college football for the Stanford Cardinal and was selected by the Bears in the 11th round of the 1964 NFL draft.

== Early life ==
Richard Peter Leeuwenburg was born on March 26, 1942, in Salt Lake City. He attended Olympus High School in Holladay, Utah.

== College career ==
Leeuwenburg enrolled at Stanford University to play college football for the Cardinal. He was on the freshman team in 1960 and sat out the 1961 season. He was then a three-year varsity letterman from 1962 to 1964.

== Professional career ==
Leeuwenburg was selected by the Chicago Bears in the 11th round, with the 154th overall pick, of the 1964 NFL draft and by the Houston Oilers in the 17th round, with the 134th overall pick, of the 1964 AFL draft. He chose to sign with the Bears after his senior year of college. He played in nine games for the Bears during the 1965 NFL season as a reserve offensive tackle. Leeuwenburg was released on August 30, 1966, after the third of four preseason games.

== Personal life ==
Leeuwenburg's son, Jay Leeuwenburg, also played in the NFL.
