= Bob Horton =

American football player (born 1942)

No. 30, 65, 38
- Position: Linebacker

Personal information
- Born: September 15, 1942 (age 84); Chicago, Illinois, U.S.
- Listed height: 6 ft 2 in (1.88 m)
- Listed weight: 230 lb (104 kg)

Career information
- High school: White Plains (White Plains, New York)
- College: Boston University (1962–1963)
- AFL draft: 1964: 11th round, 88th overall pick

Career history
- San Diego Chargers (1964–1965); Brooklyn Dodgers (1966); Akron Vulcans (1967)
- Stats at Pro Football Reference

Robert Horton (born September 15, 1942) is an American former professional football linebacker who played for the San Diego Chargers of the American Football League (AFL). He played college football for the Boston University Terriers and was selected by the Chargers in the 11th round of the 1964 AFL draft.

== Early life ==
Robert Horton was born on September 15, 1942, in Chicago, Illinois. He attended White Plains High School in White Plains, New York.

== College career ==
Horton enrolled at Boston University to play college football for the Terriers. He was a two-year varsity letterman from 1962 to 1963 as an end and fullback.

== Professional career ==
Horton was selected by the San Diego Chargers in the 11th round, with the 88th overall pick, of the 1964 AFL draft and by the Chicago Bears in the 12th round, with the 168th overall pick, of the 1964 NFL draft. He signed with the Chargers on June 15, 1964. He broke his wrist early in the 1964 season. Horton played in 22 of 28 regular season games for the Chargers from 1964 to 1965 as a reserve linebacker and special teams player. He also appeared as a backup in the 1964 American Football League Championship Game and the 1965 American Football League Championship Game. He was released on August 9, 1966, after the first game of the 1966 preseason.

Horton played for the Brooklyn Dodgers of the Continental Football League in 1966, posting one interception for ten yards. The remnants of the Dodgers became the Akron Vulcans in 1967. Horton signed with the Vulcans on July 7, 1967.
