= Ed Lothamer =

American football player (1942–2022)

No. 82
- Positions: Defensive tackle, Defensive end

Personal information
- Born: May 20, 1942; Detroit, Michigan, U.S.
- Died: June 19, 2022 (aged 80)
- Listed height: 6 ft 5 in (1.96 m)
- Listed weight: 270 lb (122 kg)

Career information
- High school: Redford (Detroit)
- College: Michigan State (1960-1963)
- NFL draft: 1964: 5th round, 64th overall pick
- AFL draft: 1964: 4th round, 26th overall pick

Career history
- Kansas City Chiefs (1964–1969, 1971–1972)

Awards and highlights
- Super Bowl champion (IV); 2× AFL champion (1966, 1969)

Career NFL/AFL statistics
- Sacks: 4
- Stats at Pro Football Reference

Edward Dewey Lothamer (May 20, 1942 - June 19, 2022) was an American professional football defensive tackle who played eight seasons in the American Football League (AFL) and in the National Football League (NFL) for the Kansas City Chiefs.

Lothamer died on June 19, 2022. He was posthumously diagnosed with stage 4 chronic traumatic encephalopathy.

== See also ==
- Other American Football League players
