= Jay Wilkinson =

American football player

Profile
- Position: Halfback

Personal information
- Born: 1942 (age 83–84)

Career information
- College: Duke

Awards and highlights
- First-team All-American (1963); ACC Player of the Year (1963); First-team All-ACC (1963)

James G. "Jay" Wilkinson (born c. 1942) is an American former football player. He played for the Duke Blue Devils football team. He was selected by the American Football Coaches Association, Football Writers Association of America, and United Press International as a first-team back on the 1963 College Football All-America Team. He was also selected as the Atlantic Coast Conference Football Player of the Year in 1963. Wilkinson was drafted by the Chicago Bears in the ninth round of the 1964 NFL draft and by the Kansas City Chiefs in the 13th round of the 1964 AFL draft, but played in neither league. His father, Bud Wilkinson, was the head football coach at the University of Oklahoma from 1947 to 1963.
