= John Kirby (American football) =

American football player (1942–2017)

No. 36, 52
- Position: Linebacker

Personal information
- Born: May 30, 1942; David City, Nebraska, U.S.
- Died: May 30, 2017 (aged 75); David City, Nebraska, U.S.
- Listed height: 6 ft 3 in (1.91 m)
- Listed weight: 230 lb (104 kg)

Career information
- High school: St Mary's (David City)
- College: Nebraska (1960-1963)
- NFL draft: 1964: 5th round, 62nd overall pick
- AFL draft: 1964: 2nd round, 16th overall pick

Career history
- Minnesota Vikings (1964–1969); New York Giants (1969-1970)

Awards and highlights
- NFL champion (1969); Second-team All-Big Eight (1963)

Career NFL statistics
- Fumble recoveries: 4
- Sacks: 4
- Stats at Pro Football Reference

John Patrick Kirby (May 30, 1942 – May 30, 2017) was a former professional American football player who played linebacker for seven seasons for the Minnesota Vikings and the New York Giants.

Kirby died on May 30, 2017, at the age of 75.
