= 1964 NFL draft =

National Football League draft

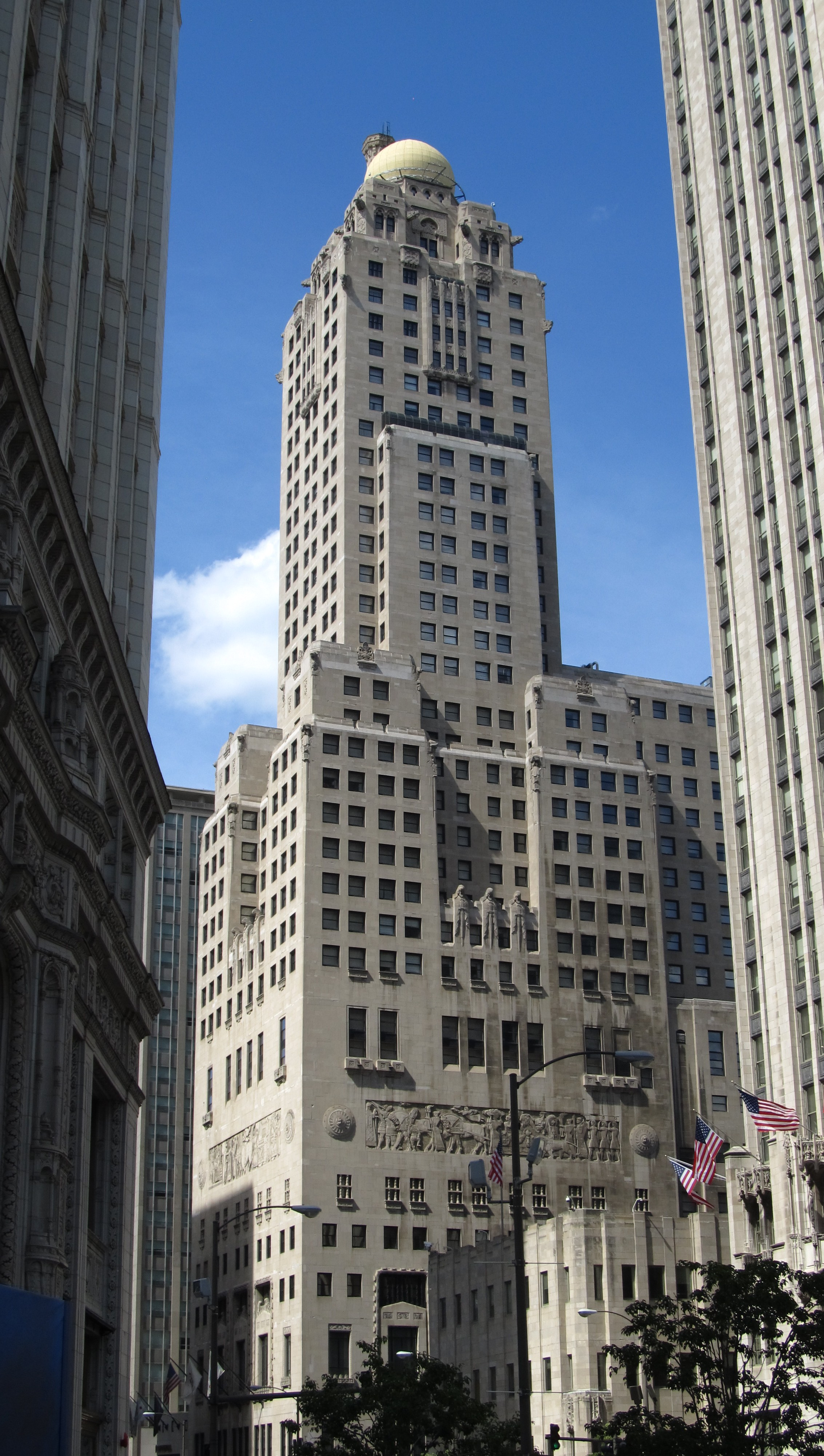
- The former Sheraton Hotel (draft venue), photographed in 2013

General information
- Date: December 2, 1963
- Location: Sheraton Hotel & Towers in Chicago, IL

Overview
- 280 total selections in 20 rounds
- League: NFL
- First selection: Dave Parks, End; San Francisco 49ers
- Mr. Irrelevant: Dick Niglio, RB; Chicago Bears
- Most selections (23): Green Bay Packers
- Fewest selections (17): Washington Redskins
- Hall of Famers: 11: OT Bob Brown; DE Carl Eller; WR Charley Taylor; WR Paul Warfield; CB Mel Renfro; S Paul Krause; LB Dave Wilcox; WR Bob Hayes; OT Bill Parcells; RB Leroy Kelly; QB Roger Staubach

The 1964 NFL draft was held in Chicago, Illinois, at the Sheraton Hotel & Towers on Monday, December 2, 1963.

The first overall pick was Dave Parks, an end from Texas Tech, selected by the San Francisco 49ers.

The AFL draft was two days earlier, on Saturday, November 30. In the next two years, the drafts were held on the same day; following the merger agreement in June 1966, a common draft was instituted for 1967.

The 1964 NFL Draft is notable for the highest number of people enshrined in Pro Football Hall of Fame with 11 total, 1 player selected was inducted as a coach, Bill Parcells.

== Player selections ==
= Pro Bowler	= AFL All-Star	= Hall of Famer

=== Round 1 ===
Pick #	NFL team	Player	Position	College
1	San Francisco 49ers	Dave Parks	End	Texas Tech
2	Philadelphia Eagles	Bob Brown ^{HOF}	Offensive tackle	Nebraska
3	Washington Redskins	Charley Taylor ^{HOF}	Halfback	Arizona State
4	Dallas Cowboys	Scott Appleton	Tackle	Texas
5	Detroit Lions	Pete Beathard	Quarterback	USC
6	Minnesota Vikings	Carl Eller ^{HOF}	Defensive end	Minnesota
7	Los Angeles Rams	Bill Munson	Quarterback	Utah State
8	Baltimore Colts	Marv Woodson	Safety	Indiana
9	St. Louis Cardinals	Ken Kortas	Tackle	Louisville
10	Pittsburgh Steelers	Paul Martha	Safety	Pittsburgh
11	Cleveland Browns	Paul Warfield ^{HOF}	Wide receiver	Ohio State
12	New York Giants	Joe Don Looney	Back	Oklahoma
13	Green Bay Packers	Lloyd Voss	Defensive end	Nebraska
14	Chicago Bears	Dick Evey	Tackle	Tennessee

- ^{HOF} Member of the Professional Football Hall of Fame

=== Round 2 ===
Pick #	NFL team	Player	Position	College
15	San Francisco 49ers	George Mira	Quarterback	Miami (FL)
16	Philadelphia Eagles	Jack Concannon	Quarterback	Boston College
17	Dallas Cowboys	Mel Renfro^{HOF}	Cornerback	Oregon
18	Washington Redskins	Paul Krause^{HOF}	Safety	Iowa
19	Minnesota Vikings	Hal Bedsole	Wide receiver	USC
20	Detroit Lions	Matt Snorton	End	Michigan State
21	Chicago Bears	Billy Martin	End	Georgia Tech
22	Baltimore Colts	Tony Lorick	Running back	Arizona State
23	Chicago Bears	Pat Crain	Running back	Clemson
24	St. Louis Cardinals	Herschel Turner	Guard	Kentucky
25	New York Giants	Steve Thurlow	Running back	Stanford
26	Cleveland Browns	Billy Truax	Tight end	Louisiana State
27	Green Bay Packers	Jon Morris	Center	Holy Cross
28	Pittsburgh Steelers	Jim Kelly	Wide receiver	Notre Dame

=== Round 3 ===
Pick #	NFL team	Player	Position	College
29	San Francisco 49ers	Dave Wilcox^{HOF}	Defensive end	Oregon
30	Detroit Lions	Pat Batten	Halfback	Hardin–Simmons
31	Los Angeles Rams	John Mims	Tackle	Rice
32	Los Angeles Rams	Willie Brown	Defensive back	USC
33	Detroit Lions	Gerry Philbin	Tackle	Buffalo
34	Minnesota Vikings	George Rose	Halfback	Auburn
35	Los Angeles Rams	Jerry Richardson	Back	West Texas State
36	Green Bay Packers	Ode Burrell	Back	Mississippi State
37	St. Louis Cardinals	Remi Prudhomme	Tackle	Louisiana State
38	Pittsburgh Steelers	Ralph Baker	Linebacker	Penn State
39	Los Angeles Rams	Roger Pillath	Tackle	Wisconsin
40	Green Bay Packers	Joe O'Donnell	Guard	Michigan
41	Green Bay Packers	Tommy Crutcher	Back	Texas Christian
42	Chicago Bears	Sid Blanks	Running back	Texas A&I

=== Round 4 ===
Pick #	NFL team	Player	Position	College
43	San Francisco 49ers	Jim Wilson	Guard	Georgia
44	Green Bay Packers	Bob Long	End	Wichita State
45	Dallas Cowboys	Perry Lee Dunn	Running back	Mississippi
46	Philadelphia Eagles	Ray Kubala	Center	Texas A&M
47	Chicago Bears	Mike Reilly	Linebacker	Iowa
48	Detroit Lions	Wally Hilgenberg	Guard	Iowa
49	New York Giants	Matt Snell ^{3}	Running back	Ohio State
50	Baltimore Colts	Ted Davis	End	Georgia Tech
51	Pittsburgh Steelers	Ben McGee	Tackle	Jackson State
52	New York Giants	George Seals	Defensive end	Missouri
53	Minnesota Vikings	Tom Keating	Defensive tackle	Michigan
54	Cleveland Browns	Don Shackelford	Tackle	Pacific
55	Green Bay Packers	Paul Costa	Tackle	Notre Dame
56	Chicago Bears	Frank Budka	Running back	Notre Dame

- ^{3} Signed as a 1st round pick with the New York Jets of the American Football League.

=== Round 5 ===
Pick #	NFL team	Player	Position	College
57	San Francisco 49ers	Rudy Johnson	Back	Nebraska
58	Philadelphia Eagles	Mickey Babb	End	Georgia
59	Washington Redskins	Jim Snowden	Running back	Notre Dame
60	Green Bay Packers	Duke Carlisle	Back	Texas
61	Detroit Lions	Benny Nelson	Halfback	Alabama
62	Minnesota Vikings	John Kirby	Linebacker	Nebraska
63	Los Angeles Rams	Ken Henson	Center	Texas Christian
64	Baltimore Colts	Ed Lothamer	Tackle	Michigan State
65	St. Louis Cardinals	Charley Brooks	End	Memphis State
66	Pittsburgh Steelers	T. W. Alley	Tackle	William & Mary
67	Cleveland Browns	Dick Klein	Tackle	Wichita State
68	New York Giants	Tony DiMidio	Tackle	West Chester
69	Green Bay Packers	Steve Wright	Tackle	Alabama
70	Chicago Bears	Dan Conners	Tackle	Miami (FL)

=== Round 6 ===
Pick #	NFL team	Player	Position	College
71	San Francisco 49ers	Gary Lewis	Back	Arizona State
72	Philadelphia Eagles	Al Denson	End	Florida A&M
73	Dallas Cowboys	Billy Lothridge	Quarterback	Georgia Tech
74	Washington Redskins	Russ Brown	End	Florida
75	Minnesota Vikings	Bob Lacey	End	North Carolina
76	Detroit Lions	John Hilton	End	Richmond
77	Los Angeles Rams	Herman Johnson	Halfback	Michigan State
78	Baltimore Colts	Jim Majurek	Tackle	Syracuse
79	Pittsburgh Steelers	Tom Gibson	Guard	South Carolina
80	St. Louis Cardinals	Dick Bowman	End	Syracuse
81	New York Giants	Henry Schichtle	Quarterback	Wichita State
82	Dallas Cowboys	Jim Curry	End	Cincinnati
83	Dallas Cowboys	Jim Evans	End	Texas-El Paso
84	Chicago Bears	Jimmy Jones	End	Wisconsin

=== Round 7 ===
Pick #	NFL team	Player	Position	College
85	San Francisco 49ers	Hagood Clarke	Back	Florida
86	Philadelphia Eagles	Pete Goimarac	Center	West Virginia
87	Washington Redskins	Dick Shiner	Quarterback	Maryland
88	Dallas Cowboys	Bob Hayes^{HOF}	Wide receiver	Florida A&M
89	Detroit Lions	Bill Parcells^{HOF}	Tackle	Wichita State
90	Minnesota Vikings	Wes Bryant	Tackle	Arkansas
91	Los Angeles Rams	John Varnell	Tackle	West Texas State
92	Baltimore Colts	Ken Sugarman	Tackle	Whitworth
93	St. Louis Cardinals	Jerry Lamb	End	Arkansas
94	Pittsburgh Steelers	Bobby Smith	Halfback	North Texas State
95	Cleveland Browns	Sammy Odom	Linebacker	Northwestern State (LA)
96	New York Giants	Roger Anderson	Tackle	Virginia Union
97	Green Bay Packers	Dick Herzing	Tackle	Drake
98	Chicago Bears	Chuck Logan	End	Northwestern

=== Round 8 ===
Pick #	NFL team	Player	Position	College
99	San Francisco 49ers	Bob Daugherty	Back	Tulsa
100	New York Giants	Ray Popp	Guard	Pittsburgh
101	Dallas Cowboys	Al Geverink	Halfback	UCLA
102	San Francisco 49ers	Bob Poole	End	Clemson
103	Minnesota Vikings	Bill McWatters	Running back	North Texas State
104	St. Louis Cardinals	George Bednar	Guard	Notre Dame
105	Los Angeles Rams	Bucky Pope	Wide receiver	Catawba
106	Baltimore Colts	John Williamson	Linebacker	Louisiana Tech
107	Pittsburgh Steelers	Bobby Currington	Halfback	North Carolina Central
108	St. Louis Cardinals	Bob Johnson	End	Wisconsin
109	New York Giants	Gary Wood	Quarterback	Cornell
110	Cleveland Browns	Leroy Kelly^{HOF}	Running back	Morgan State
111	Green Bay Packers	Ken Bowman	Center	Wisconsin
112	Chicago Bears	Larry Rakestraw	Quarterback	Georgia

=== Round 9 ===
Pick #	NFL team	Player	Position	College
113	San Francisco 49ers	Howard Mudd	Guard	Hillsdale
114	Philadelphia Eagles	Larry Smith	Back	Mississippi
115	Washington Redskins	Len Hauss	Center	Georgia
116	Dallas Cowboys	Jake Kupp	End	Washington
117	Detroit Lions	Wayne Rasmussen	Halfback	South Dakota State
118	Minnesota Vikings	Darrell Lester	Running back	McNeese State
119	Los Angeles Rams	Jerry Burton	Back	Northwestern State (LA)
120	Baltimore Colts	Vince Turner	Back	Missouri
121	St. Louis Cardinals	Willie Ross	Back	Nebraska
122	Pittsburgh Steelers	Bob Nichols	Tackle	Stanford
123	Cleveland Browns	John Briscoe	Linebacker	Arizona
124	New York Giants	Mickey Bitsko	Linebacker	Dayton
125	Green Bay Packers	John McDowell	Tackle	St. John's (MN)
126	Chicago Bears	Jay Wilkinson	Running back	Duke

=== Round 10 ===
Pick #	NFL team	Player	Position	College
127	San Francisco 49ers	Fred Polser	Tackle	East Texas State
128	Philadelphia Eagles	Tom Boris	Back	Purdue
129	Dallas Cowboys	Roger Staubach^{HOF}	Quarterback	Navy
130	Washington Redskins	Rick Leeson	Back	Pittsburgh
131	Los Angeles Rams	Ron Smith	Quarterback	Richmond
132	Detroit Lions	Larry Hand	Defensive tackle	Appalachian State
133	Los Angeles Rams	Gary Larsen	Tackle	Concordia (Moorhead)
134	Detroit Lions	Glenn Holton	Halfback	West Virginia
135	Cleveland Browns	Bobby Robinson	Guard	Mississippi
136	St. Louis Cardinals	Tony Lawrence	Tackle	Bowling Green
137	New York Giants	Jim Moran	Tackle	Idaho
138	Cleveland Browns	Dick Van Raaphorst	Kicker	Ohio State
139	Green Bay Packers	Allen Jacobs	Back	Utah
140	Chicago Bears	Mike Brown	Back	Delaware

=== Round 11 ===
Pick #	NFL team	Player	Position	College
141	San Francisco 49ers	Dennis Almquist	Guard	Idaho
142	Philadelphia Eagles	Bob Berry	Quarterback	Oregon
143	Washington Redskins	Gene Donaldson	Linebacker	Purdue
144	Dallas Cowboys	Bob Crenshaw	Guard	Baylor
145	Detroit Lions	Don Hyne	Tackle	Baldwin–Wallace
146	Minnesota Vikings	H.O. Estes	Guard	East Central (OK)
147	Los Angeles Rams	John Farris	Tackle	San Diego State
148	Baltimore Colts	John Paglio	Tackle	Syracuse
149	St. Louis Cardinals	Richard Hard	Tackle	Wenatchee Valley J.C.
150	Pittsburgh Steelers	Bob Soleau	Guard	William & Mary
151	Cleveland Browns	Eddie Versprille	Running back	Alabama
152	New York Giants	Glen Condren	Tackle	Oklahoma
153	Green Bay Packers	Jack Petersen	Tackle	Nebraska-Omaha
154	Chicago Bears	Dick Leeuwenburg	Tackle	Stanford

=== Round 12 ===
Pick #	NFL team	Player	Position	College
155	San Francisco 49ers	Jim Long	Back	Fresno State
156	Philadelphia Eagles	John Sapinsky	Tackle	William & Mary
157	Dallas Cowboys	Johnny Norman	End	Northwestern State (LA)
158	Washington Redskins	Bob Zvolerin	Tackle	Tennessee
159	Minnesota Vikings	Sandy Sands	End	Texas
160	Detroit Lions	Warren Wells	End	Texas Southern
161	Los Angeles Rams	Bill Dawson	End	Florida State
162	Baltimore Colts	Kenny Graham	Safety	Washington State
163	Pittsburgh Steelers	Bob Sherman	Halfback	Iowa
164	St. Louis Cardinals	Rick Sortun	Guard	Washington
165	New York Giants	Jim McNaughton	End	Utah State
166	Cleveland Browns	Ed Mitchell	Tackle	Southern
167	Green Bay Packers	Dwain Bean	Back	North Texas State
168	Chicago Bears	Bob Horton	Running back	Boston University

=== Round 13 ===
Pick #	NFL team	Player	Position	College
169	San Francisco 49ers	Bob Brown	Tackle	Arkansas A&M
170	Philadelphia Eagles	Howard Kindig	Center	Cal State-Los Angeles
171	Washington Redskins	Tom MacDonald	Back	Notre Dame
172	Dallas Cowboys	Jerry Rhome	Quarterback	Tulsa
173	Detroit Lions	John Miller	Tackle	Idaho State
174	Minnesota Vikings	Russ Vollmer	Halfback	Memphis State
175	Los Angeles Rams	Marvin Harris	Center	Stanford
176	Baltimore Colts	Charlie Parker	Tackle	Southern Mississippi
177	St. Louis Cardinals	Jake Adams	End	Virginia Tech
178	Pittsburgh Steelers	Glenn Baker	Tackle	Washington State
179	Cleveland Browns	Bob Meehan	Guard	Syracuse
180	New York Giants	John Delbert	Tackle	Penn State
181	Green Bay Packers	Jack Mauro	Tackle	Northern Michigan
182	Chicago Bears	Cloyd Webb	End	Iowa

=== Round 14 ===
Pick #	NFL team	Player	Position	College
183	San Francisco 49ers	Ed Beard	Tackle	Tennessee
184	Philadelphia Eagles	Ernie Arizzi	Back	Maryland
185	Dallas Cowboys	Jim Worden	Linebacker	Wittenberg
186	Washington Redskins	Tom Urbank	Back	Penn State
187	Minnesota Vikings	Tom Michel	Halfback	East Carolina
188	Detroit Lions	Doug Bickle	End	Hillsdale
189	Los Angeles Rams	John Garrett	Linebacker	Oklahoma
190	Baltimore Colts	John Case	End	Clemson
191	Pittsburgh Steelers	Tom Jenkins	Guard	Ohio State
192	St. Louis Cardinals	Len Slaby	Center	Syracuse
193	New York Giants	Bill Harris	Halfback	Colorado
194	Cleveland Browns	Terry Sieg	Halfback	Virginia
195	Green Bay Packers	Tom O'Grady	End	Northwestern
196	Chicago Bears	Kent Francisco	Tackle	UCLA

=== Round 15 ===
Pick #	NFL team	Player	Position	College
197	San Francisco 49ers	Jim Griffin	End	Grambling
198	Philadelphia Eagles	Bob Burrows	Tackle	East Texas State
199	Washington Redskins	Dick Evers	Tackle	Colorado State
200	Dallas Cowboys	Bill Van Burkleo	Back	Tulsa
201	Detroit Lions	Roger LaLonde	Tackle	Muskingum
202	Minnesota Vikings	Monte Kiffin	Tackle	Nebraska
203	Los Angeles Rams	Mike Mayne	End	Idaho
204	Baltimore Colts	Larry Kramer	Tackle	Nebraska
205	St. Louis Cardinals	Cliff Stallings	Back	New Mexico
206	Pittsburgh Steelers	Barry Brown	End	Florida
207	Cleveland Browns	John Houtman	Tackle	Michigan
208	New York Giants	Chuck Hinton	Guard	Mississippi
209	Green Bay Packers	Alex Zerko	Tackle	Kent State
210	Chicago Bears	George Burman	Tackle	Northwestern

=== Round 16 ===
Pick #	NFL team	Player	Position	College
211	San Francisco 49ers	Cornell Gordon	Back	North Carolina A&T
212	Philadelphia Eagles	Will Radosevich	Tackle	Wyoming
213	Dallas Cowboys	Paul Cercel	Center	Pittsburgh
214	Washington Redskins	Tom Walters	Back	Southern Mississippi
215	Minnesota Vikings	Carleton Oats	Defensive end	Florida A&M
216	Detroit Lions	Allan Robinson	Halfback	Brigham Young
217	Los Angeles Rams	Phil Zera	Back	St. Joseph's (IN)
218	Baltimore Colts	Roger Lopes	Running back	Michigan State
219	Pittsburgh Steelers	Ed Kesler	Running back	North Carolina
220	St. Louis Cardinals	Jack Ankerson	Quarterback	Ripon
221	New York Giants	Wynn Lembright	Tackle	Toledo
222	Cleveland Browns	Sid Williams	Linebacker	Southern
223	Green Bay Packers	Andrew Ireland	Back	Utah
224	Chicago Bears	Roderick Butler	Running back	Eastern Illinois

=== Round 17 ===
Pick #	NFL team	Player	Position	College
225	San Francisco 49ers	Ken Brusven	Tackle	Oregon State
226	Philadelphia Eagles	Mike Morgan	End	Louisiana State
227	Washington Redskins	Ozzie Clay	Back	Iowa State
228	Dallas Cowboys	Bud Abell	End	Missouri
229	Detroit Lions	Joe Provenzano	Tackle	Kansas State
230	Minnesota Vikings	Jerry McClurg	End	Colorado
231	Los Angeles Rams	Jim Galmin	End	Tampa
232	Baltimore Colts	Don Green	Halfback	Susquehanna
233	St. Louis Cardinals	John Evans	Tackle	Memphis
234	Pittsburgh Steelers	Dennis Shaw	Center	Detroit
235	Cleveland Browns	Larry Bartolameolli	Tackle	Western Michigan
236	New York Giants	Dave Humenik	Tackle	Notre Dame
237	Green Bay Packers	Len St. Jean	End	Northern Michigan
238	Chicago Bears	Constantinos Kasapis	Tackle	Iowa

=== Round 18 ===
Pick #	NFL team	Player	Position	College
239	San Francisco 49ers	Jerry Cole	End	Southwest Texas State
240	Philadelphia Eagles	Izzy Lang	Running back	Tennessee State
241	Dallas Cowboys	Theo Viltz	Defensive back	USC
242	Washington Redskins	Bob Jones	Guard	Nebraska
243	Minnesota Vikings	Carl Robinson	Tackle	Prairie View A&M
244	Detroit Lions	Willis Langley	Tackle	Louisiana State
245	Los Angeles Rams	Tom Smith	Guard	Villanova
246	Baltimore Colts	Alvin Haymond	Running back	Southern
247	Pittsburgh Steelers	Oliver Dobbins	Halfback	Morgan State
248	St. Louis Cardinals	Dave Hoover	Back	Iowa State
249	New York Giants	Jim Garrett	Halfback	Grambling
250	Cleveland Browns	Sherman Lewis	Running back	Michigan State
251	Green Bay Packers	Mike Hicks	Guard	Marshall
252	Chicago Bears	Bob Batts	Running back	Texas Southern

=== Round 19 ===
Pick #	NFL team	Player	Position	College
253	San Francisco 49ers	Larry Rawson	Back	Auburn
254	Philadelphia Eagles	Dick Bowe	Tackle	Rice
255	Washington Redskins	John Seedborg	Guard	Arizona State
256	Dallas Cowboys	H.D. Murphy	Back	Oregon
257	Detroit Lions	Bruce Zellmer	Halfback	Winona State
258	Minnesota Vikings	Dick Schott	End	Louisville
259	Los Angeles Rams	Bob Cherry	End	Wittenberg
260	Baltimore Colts	Owen Dejanovich	Tackle	Northern Arizona
261	St. Louis Cardinals	Bob Young	Tackle	Howard Payne
262	Pittsburgh Steelers	Don Marshall	Tackle	Lehigh
263	Cleveland Browns	Jim Higgins	Guard	Xavier
264	New York Giants	Frank Kinard	Halfback	Mississippi
265	Green Bay Packers	John Baker	End	Norfolk State
266	Chicago Bears	Jim Whitehead	Tackle	Georgia

=== Round 20 ===
Pick #	NFL team	Player	Position	College
267	San Francisco 49ers	Gene Baker	Guard	Whitworth
268	Philadelphia Eagles	Tommy Lucas	Guard	Mississippi
269	Dallas Cowboys	John Hughes	Linebacker	Southern Methodist
270	Washington Redskins	Gordon Guest	Back	Arkansas
271	Minnesota Vikings	Milt Sunde	Tackle	Minnesota
272	Detroit Lions	Steve Barilla	Tackle	Wichita State
273	Los Angeles Rams	Bob Hohn	Halfback	Nebraska
274	Baltimore Colts	John Butler	Running back	San Diego State
275	Pittsburgh Steelers	Brian Generalovich	End	Pittsburgh
276	St. Louis Cardinals	Ralph Kubinski	Guard	Missouri
277	New York Giants	Tony Gibbons	Tackle	John Carroll
278	Cleveland Browns	Dave Archer	Tackle	Syracuse
279	Green Bay Packers	Bill Curry	Center	Georgia Tech
280	Chicago Bears	Dick Niglio	Running back	Yale

= Pro Bowler	= AFL All-Star	= Hall of Famer

== Hall of Famers ==
The 1964 NFL draft class has more Hall of Famers than any other class, with 11.

- Paul Warfield, halfback from Ohio State University Taken 1st round 11th overall by the Cleveland Browns.

Inducted: Professional Football Hall of Fame class of 1983.

- Charley Taylor, halfback from Arizona State University taken 1st round 3rd overall by the Washington Redskins.

Inducted: Professional Football Hall of Fame class of 1984.

- Roger Staubach, quarterback from Navy taken 10th round 129th overall by the Dallas Cowboys.

Inducted: Professional Football Hall of Fame class of 1985.

- Leroy Kelly, running back from Morgan State taken 8th round 110th overall by the Cleveland Browns.

Inducted: Professional Football Hall of Fame class of 1994.

- Mel Renfro, cornerback from Oregon taken 2nd round 17th overall by the Dallas Cowboys.

Inducted: Professional Football Hall of Fame class of 1996.

- Paul Krause, safety from Iowa taken 2nd round 18th overall by the Washington Redskins.

Inducted: Professional Football Hall of Fame class of 1998.

- Dave Wilcox, linebacker from Oregon taken 3rd round 29th overall by the San Francisco 49ers.

Inducted: Professional Football Hall of Fame class of 2000.

- Bob Brown, offensive tackle from University of Nebraska–Lincoln taken 1st round 2nd overall by the Philadelphia Eagles.

Inducted: Professional Football Hall of Fame class of 2004.

- Carl Eller, defensive end from University of Minnesota taken 1st round 6th overall by the Minnesota Vikings.

Inducted: Professional Football Hall of Fame class of 2004.

- Bob Hayes, wide receiver from Florida A&M taken 7th round 88th overall by the Dallas Cowboys.

Inducted: Professional Football Hall of Fame class of 2009.

- Bill Parcells, offensive tackle from Wichita State University taken 7th round 89th overall by the Detroit Lions

Inducted: Professional Football Hall of Fame class of 2013 as a Head Coach.

== Notable undrafted players ==
^{†}	= Pro Bowler

Original NFL team	Player	Pos.	College	Notes
Chicago Bears	Andy Livingston ^{†}	RB	Phoenix College	
Chicago Bears	Jim Purnell	LB	Wisconsin	
Cleveland Browns	Walter Roberts	WR	San Jose State	
Dallas Cowboys	Peter Gent	WR/TE	Michigan State	
Dallas Cowboys	Les Josephson ^{†}	RB	Augustana	
Los Angeles Rams	Bruce Gossett ^{†}	K	Richmond	
Los Angeles Rams	Aaron Martin	CB	North Carolina Central	
Los Angeles Rams	Fred Whittingham	LB	Brigham Young	
Minnesota Vikings	Lonnie Warwick	LB	Tennessee Tech	
Minnesota Vikings	Clyde Williams	G	Southern	
New York Giants	Ernie Wheelwright	RB	Southern Illinois	
Pittsburgh Steelers	John Stofa	QB	Buffalo	
Pittsburgh Steelers	Tommy Wade	QB	Texas	
San Francisco 49ers	David Kopay	RB	Washington	

== See also ==
- 1964 American Football League draft
