= 1963 All-Big Eight Conference football team =

American all-star college football team

The 1963 All-Big Eight Conference football team consists of American football players chosen by various organizations for All-Big Eight Conference teams for the 1963 NCAA University Division football season. The selectors for the 1963 season included the Associated Press (AP) and the United Press International (UPI). Players selected as first-team players by both the AP and UPI are designated in bold.

== All-Big Eight selections ==
=== Backs ===
- **Gale Sayers**, Kansas (AP-1; UPI-1 [HB]) (College and Pro Football Halls of Fame)
- **Tom Vaughn**, Iowa State (AP-1; UPI-1 [HB])
- **Jim Grisham**, Oklahoma (AP-1; UPI-1 [FB])
- Dennis Claridge, Nebraska (AP-1; UPI-2)
- Gary Lane, Missouri (AP-2; UPI-1 [QB])
- Dick Limerick, Iowa St. (AP-2; UPI-2)
- Bill Harris, Colorado (AP-2; UPI-2)
- Rudy Johnson, Nebraska (AP-2)
- Willie Ross, Nebraska (UPI-2)

=== Ends ===
- **George Seals**, Missouri (AP-1; UPI-1)
- Mike Shinn, Kansas (AP-1)
- John Flynn, Oklahoma (UPI-1)
- Jack Jacobson, Oklahoma St. (AP-2)
- Ralph McFillen, Kansas St. (AP-2)
- Larry Hannah, Iowa St. (UPI-2)
- Rick McCurdy, Oklahoma (UPI-2)

=== Tackles ===
- **Ralph Neely**, Oklahoma (AP-1; UPI-1)
- **Lloyd Voss**, Nebraska (AP-1; UPI-1)
- Brian Schweda, Kansas (AP-2; UPI-2)
- Dave Gill, Missouri (AP-2; UPI-2)

=== Guards ===
- **Bob Brown**, Nebraska (AP-1; UPI-1) (College and Pro Football Halls of Fame)
- **Newt Burton**, Oklahoma (AP-1; UPI-1)
- John Kirby, Nebraska (AP-2)
- Gene Oliver, Missouri (AP-2)
- Ed McQuarters, Oklahoma (UPI-2)
- Bob Mitts, Kansas St. (UPI-2)

=== Centers ===
- John Berrington, Iowa State (AP-1; UPI-2)
- Pete Quatrochi, Kansas (UPI-1)
- John Garrett, Oklahoma (AP-2)

== Key ==
AP = Associated Press

UPI = United Press International

== See also ==
- 1963 College Football All-America Team
