= Jim Kelly (tight end, born 1942) =

American football player (1942–2022)

No. 89, 84
- Position: Tight end

Personal information
- Born: April 23, 1942; McKeesport, Pennsylvania, U.S.
- Died: May 18, 2022 (aged 80); Leisuretowne, New Jersey, U.S.
- Listed height: 6 ft 2 in (1.88 m)
- Listed weight: 218 lb (99 kg)

Career information
- High school: Clairton (Clairton, Pennsylvania)
- College: Notre Dame (1960–1963)
- NFL draft: 1964: 2nd round, 28th overall pick
- AFL draft: 1964: 2nd round, 13th overall pick

Career history
- Pittsburgh Steelers (1964); Philadelphia Eagles (1965, 1967); Baltimore Colts (1968)*; Philadelphia Eagles (1968)
- * Offseason or practice squad member only

Awards and highlights
- First-team All-American (1963)

Career NFL statistics
- Receptions: 31
- Receiving yards: 531
- Touchdowns: 5
- Stats at Pro Football Reference

James Harry Kelly (April 23, 1942 – May 18, 2022) was an American professional football tight end who played three seasons in the National Football League (NFL) with the Pittsburgh Steelers and Philadelphia Eagles. He was selected by the Steelers in the second round of the 1964 NFL draft after playing college football at the University of Notre Dame.

== Early life and college ==
James Harry Kelly was born on April 23, 1942, in McKeesport, Pennsylvania. He attended Clairton High School in Clairton, Pennsylvania.

Kelly was a member of the Notre Dame Fighting Irish of the University of Notre Dame from 1960 to 1963. He caught nine passes for 138 yards and two touchdowns in 1961, 41 passes for 523 yards and four touchdowns in 1962, and 18 passes for 264 yards and two touchdowns in 1963. He was named a first-team All-American by both United Press International and the American Football Coaches Association his senior year in 1963.

== Professional career ==
Kelly was selected by the Boston Patriots in the second round, with the 13th overall pick, of the 1964 AFL draft and by the Pittsburgh Steelers in the second round, with the 28th overall pick, of the 1964 NFL draft. He chose to sign with the Steelers. He played in six games, starting five, during the 1964 season, recording ten receptions for 186 yards and one touchdown and one kick return for 12 yards. Kelly became a free agent after the season and re-signed with the Steelers on June 26, 1965. He was released on September 8, 1965.

Kelly was then signed to the taxi squad of the Philadelphia Eagles. He was promoted to the active roster on December 18, 1965. He then played in the final game of the regular season. Kelly was released on August 23, 1966. He later re-signed with the Eagles and played in 12 games, starting seven, for the team during the 1967 season, catching 21 passes for 345 yards and four touchdowns. He was released on September 5, 1968.

Kelly was claimed off waivers by the Baltimore Colts on September 6, 1968, but released four days later.

He re-signed with the Eagles shortly thereafter but ended up spending the entire 1968 season on injured reserve. He was released in 1969.

== Personal life ==
Kelly worked in the publishing industry after his NFL career. He died on May 18, 2022, in Leisuretowne, New Jersey.
