= Matt Snorton =

American football player (1942–2016)

No. 84
- Position: Tight end

Personal information
- Born: September 26, 1942; Crofton, Kentucky, U.S.
- Died: December 30, 2016 (aged 74); Christian County, Kentucky, U.S.
- Listed height: 6 ft 4 in (1.93 m)
- Listed weight: 250 lb (113 kg)

Career information
- High school: Northwestern (Detroit, Michigan)
- College: Michigan State (1960–1963)
- NFL draft: 1964: 2nd round, 20th overall pick
- AFL draft: 1964: 3rd round, 20th overall pick

Career history
- Denver Broncos (1964)

Awards and highlights
- Second-team All-Big Ten (1962)
- Stats at Pro Football Reference

Hickman Matthew Snorton (February 26, 1942 – December 30, 2016) was an American football player.

== Early life ==
When Matt Snorton was a little child, his family moved from Kentucky to Detroit, Michigan, where Matt attended high school. He was a talented basketball player, baseball and football player, ad marching band musician. The high school baseball team of Snorton won the Detroit Public School League championship in 1959.

Later on, he was given offers for football and band scholarships as well as professional baseball deal.

== Career ==
Snorton then settled at Michigan State University, where he played for the Michigan State University Spartans football team from 1961 to 1963. He was drafted by the Detroit Lions in the second round of the 1964 NFL draft, but opted instead to play professional football in the AFL for the Denver Broncos, appearing in five games during the 1964 season. He later became the emergency manager for Christian County, Kentucky.

Snorton died on December 30, 2016, at the age of 74.
