= Jim Wilson (wrestler) =

American football player and wrestler (1942–2009)

- Born: James Milligan Wilson; June 12, 1942; Pittsburgh, Pennsylvania, U.S.
- Died: February 2, 2009 (aged 66); Atlanta, Georgia, U.S.
- Spouse: Nita Jones
- Children: 6
- Professional wrestling career
- Ring name: Jim Wilson
- Billed height: 6 ft 3 in (191 cm)
- Billed weight: 257 lb (117 kg)
- Debut: 1971
- Retired: 1985
- Football career

Profile
- Positions: Offensive tackle, guard

Personal information
- Listed height: 6 ft 6 in (1.98 m)
- Listed weight: 258 lb (117 kg)

Career information
- High school: Edgewood (PA)
- College: Georgia
- NFL draft: 1964: 4th round, 43rd overall pick
- AFL draft: 1964: 14th round, 109th overall pick

Career history
- San Francisco 49ers (1965–1966); Atlanta Falcons (1967); Los Angeles Rams (1968–1971)

Awards and highlights
- First-team All-American (1964); First-team All-SEC (1964)
- Stats at Pro Football Reference

James Milligan Wilson (June 12, 1942 – February 2, 2009) was an American professional football offensive lineman and a professional wrestler.

During his time as a wrestler, he attempted to start a labor union for wrestlers, and continued his efforts after he left the sport. He is the co-author of a book called CHOKEHOLD: Pro Wrestling's Real Mayhem Outside the Ring which exposed certain unfair labor practices by various promoters, most of them National Wrestling Alliance members, but also including Vince McMahon and WWE.

== Football career ==
He had been a good athlete from his early years, overcoming a spinal curvature problem and was offered a football scholarship to the University of Georgia. Although recruited from high school as a fullback, because of his size he played both ways as an offensive and defensive lineman and was named All-American for his contributions as an offensive tackle during his time there; he was coach Vince Dooley's first All-American. Coach Dooley would comment at Wilson's funeral service that had he known of his accomplishments as a high school fullback, he would have handed Wilson the ball as well.

In 1964, he was drafted by the then-Boston Patriots of the American Football League and the San Francisco 49ers of the established National Football League; he signed with the 49ers. He was also voted into the 1965 All Rookie team. Wilson played in San Francisco for two seasons and then, at his request, was dealt to the Atlanta Falcons, who were just starting up. It was during his time with the Falcons that he was approached by Georgia wrestler and promoter Ray Gunkel to wrestle during the football off-season. He agreed to do so, as most NFL contracts at that time did not pay during the off season.

The Falcons did not approve of his off-season wrestling, and as a result, he was traded to the then-Los Angeles Rams for whom he played for three seasons, before injuries ended his NFL career in 1971.

In 2001, he was inducted into the Georgia Sports Hall of Fame. Four years later, he was also inducted into the UGA Circle of Honor.

== Professional wrestling career ==
Wilson attempted to reform professional wrestling and start up a union for professional wrestlers. He wrote the book CHOKEHOLD: Pro Wrestling's Real Mayhem Outside the Ring, which was released in 2003 in which he claimed he had been blackballed from the sport. Wilson brought forward an antitrust case against the National Wrestling Alliance in 1980. In 1984, he also appeared on 20/20, speaking out against the wrestling industry. In addition, in 2007, he attempted to convince the United States Congress to hold hearings on the wrestling industry.

== Personal life ==
Wilson was born to a fairly distinguished family living just outside Pittsburgh. His father had been a decorated veteran of World War II and his mother's side traced its lineage back to the Mayflower. While at Georgia, he married Nita Jones, and the couple had six children together. Outside of professional wrestling, he worked in real estate for twenty years.

On February 2, 2009, Wilson died at the age of 66 in Atlanta, following a battle with cancer.

== See also ==
- List of gridiron football players who became professional wrestlers
