= Perry Lee Dunn =

American football player (1941–2018)

No. 37, 31
- Position: Running back

Personal information
- Born: January 20, 1941; Natchez, Mississippi, U.S.
- Died: October 27, 2018 (aged 77); Jackson, Mississippi, U.S.
- Listed height: 6 ft 2 in (1.88 m)
- Listed weight: 210 lb (95 kg)

Career information
- High school: Natchez
- College: Mississippi (1960-1963)
- NFL draft: 1964: 4th round, 45th overall pick
- AFL draft: 1964: 3rd round, 24th overall pick

Career history
- Dallas Cowboys (1964–1965); Atlanta Falcons (1966–1968); Baltimore Colts (1969)

Awards and highlights
- Second-team All-SEC (1963)

Career NFL statistics
- Rushing yards: 653
- Rushing average: 3.1
- Receptions: 42
- Receiving yards: 408
- Total touchdowns: 7
- Stats at Pro Football Reference

Perry Lee Dunn (January 20, 1941 – October 27, 2018), was an American professional football player who was a running back in the National Football League (NFL) for the Dallas Cowboys, Atlanta Falcons and Baltimore Colts. He played college football for the Ole Miss Rebels.

== Early life ==
At Natchez High School he started every game at quarterback except his first one, only losing 4 games. He also played safety, returner and punter. He competed in the hurdles in track.

As a senior, he rushed and passed for 2,609 yards, registered 20 rushing touchdowns, 14 passing touchdowns and completed 59 percent of his passes. He was named the Big Eight Conference Outstanding Back in 1959.

He finished his high school career with 2,895 rushing yards, 46 rushing touchdowns, 2,822 passing yards, 38 passing touchdowns and 1,097 return yards. He also set different school and state records. He received high school All-American, three-time All-Big Eight Conference quarterback, All-Southern and All-State honors.

== College career ==
Dunn accepted a football scholarship from the University of Mississippi as a quarterback. In 1962, as a junior, he was moved to fullback because of the play of quarterback Glynn Griffing. The team would go on to have the only undefeated season in school history and shared the national championship with the University of Southern California. He posted 262 rushing yards, 4 rushing touchdowns, 41 receiving yards and averaged 36.8 yards punting.

As a senior, he was named the starting quarterback, registering 820 passing yards with 9 touchdowns and 5 interceptions in 8 games. He also led the team to an SEC title and received second-team All-SEC honors.

He finished his college career with 1,820 all-purpose yards, 1,121 passing yards, 16 passing touchdowns, 563 rushing yards, 2 rushing touchdowns and 8 receptions for 97 yards.

== Professional career ==
=== Dallas Cowboys ===
Dunn was selected by the Dallas Cowboys in the fourth round (45th overall) of the 1964 NFL draft and by the San Diego Chargers in the third round (24th overall) of the 1964 AFL draft.

The Cowboys drafted him as a safety, but after having problems playing the position in the Chicago College All-Star Game, head coach Tom Landry decided that it would be best to switch him to halfback. As a rookie, he started the last 2 games of the season because of injuries. In 1965, he started 7 games at halfback.

=== Atlanta Falcons ===
The Atlanta Falcons selected him from the Cowboys roster in the 1966 NFL expansion draft and moved him to fullback. He was traded to the Baltimore Colts in exchange for a draft choice (not exercised), before the start of the 1969 season.

=== Baltimore Colts ===
In 1969, Dunn played in 5 games for the Baltimore Colts, before being waived injured on October 20, after he sprained his knee. His career as an active player ended when he was released by the Colts on September 1, 1970.

== Personal life ==
On October 27, 2018, he died after battling an extended illness.
