= Aubrey Linne =

American gridiron football player (born 1939)

Profile
- Positions: Tight end, Punter

Personal information
- Born: April 19, 1939 (age 87)
- Listed height: 6 ft 7 in (2.01 m)
- Listed weight: 235 lb (107 kg)

Career information
- College: Texas Christian University
- NFL draft: 1961

Career history
- 1961–1961: Baltimore Colts
- 1962–1963: Toronto Argonauts
- 1963–1963: Edmonton Eskimos
- Stats at Pro Football Reference

Aubrey Linne (born April 19, 1939) was a tight end in the National Football League and Canadian Football League from 1961 to 1963.

After playing college football at Texas Christian University, Aubrey Linne joined the Baltimore Colts in 1961 but was put on waivers in 1962 after playing only one game. Linne was picked up that year by the Toronto Argonauts where he had his best season with 21 catches for 401 yards and a 19.1 yards per catch average in 6 games. However, in 1963, he played only 4 games for the Argos. He went to the Edmonton Eskimos, where he played 8 games and recorded 16 catches for 200 yards and a 12.5 yards per catch average. He also served as the Eskimos' punter where he logged 43 punts for a 40.7 yards per punt average, a high of 73 yards and 2 single points. However, he was replaced the following year by Marcel Deleeuw and never played again. He was one of the tallest players in the CFL at that time at 6 feet 7 inches.
