= Bob Dugan =

American football player (1940–2026)

No. 61
- Positions: Tackle, defensive end

Personal information
- Born: May 3, 1940; Buffalo, New York, U.S.
- Died: May 2, 2026 (aged 85); Tonawanda, New York, U.S.
- Listed height: 6 ft 1 in (1.85 m)
- Listed weight: 240 lb (109 kg)

Career information
- High school: Lafayette (Buffalo)
- College: Mississippi State (1959–1963)
- AFL draft: 1964: 20th round, 157th overall pick

Career history
- Buffalo Bills (1964–1965)*; → Hartford Charter Oaks (1964); Toronto Argonauts (1965)
- * Offseason or practice squad member only

Awards and highlights
- AFL champion (1964)

Career CFL statistics
- Games played: 13

Robert A. Dugan (May 3, 1940 – May 2, 2026) was an American professional football offensive tackle and defensive end who played in the Canadian Football League (CFL) for the Toronto Argonauts. He played college football for the Mississippi State Bulldogs. Dugan had stints in the American Football League (AFL) with the Buffalo Bills and the Atlantic Coast Football League (ACFL) with the Hartford Charter Oaks.

== Early life ==
Dugan was born on May 3, 1940 in Buffalo, New York. He attended Lafayette High School in Buffalo.

== College career ==
Dugan played college football for the Mississippi State Bulldogs from 1959 to 1963. He was a two-year letterman in 1962 and 1963 at tackle. Dugan was described by coach Paul E. Davis as "a fine leader on the field" and "one of our most consistent performers".

== Professional career ==
=== Buffalo Bills ===
Dugan was selected in the 20th round, with the 157th overall selection, by the Buffalo Bills in the 1964 AFL draft. On January 4, 1964, he signed with the team. On September 1, Dugan was released. He was later signed to the taxi squad where he spent the rest of the season as the Bills won the AFL Championship Game. On April 8, 1965, Dugan was re-signed by the team. On August 10, he was released.

=== Hartford Charter Oaks ===
On September 21, 1964, Dugan was allocated to the Hartford Charter Oaks of the Atlantic Coast Football League (ACFL). He played in the 1964 season at tackle.

=== Toronto Argonauts ===
On August 12, 1965, Dugan signed with the Toronto Argonauts of the Canadian Football League (CFL). He played in 13 games at defensive end on the 1965 CFL season. On July 29, 1966, Dugan was released by the team after not signing a contract.
