= Willie Ross (American football) =

American football player (born 1941)

No. 47, 28, 26
- Position: Halfback

Personal information
- Born: June 6, 1941 (age 85); Helena, Arkansas, U.S.
- Listed height: 5 ft 10 in (1.78 m)
- Listed weight: 200 lb (91 kg)

Career information
- High school: Elize Miller (West Helena, Arkansas)
- College: Nebraska (1960-1963)
- NFL draft: 1964: 9th round, 121st overall pick
- AFL draft: 1964: 12th round, 90th overall pick

Career history
- Buffalo Bills (1964); Calgary Stampeders (1966); Norfolk Neptunes (1967-1968)

Awards and highlights
- AFL champion (1964); 2× Second-team All-Big Eight (1962, 1963)

Career AFL statistics
- Rushing yards: 14
- Rushing average: 3.5
- Touchdowns: 1
- Stats at Pro Football Reference

William James Ross (born June 6, 1941) is an American former professional football player who was a halfback with the Buffalo Bills of the American Football League (AFL). He played college football for the Nebraska Cornhuskers.
