= Ray Kubala =

American football player (1942–2018)

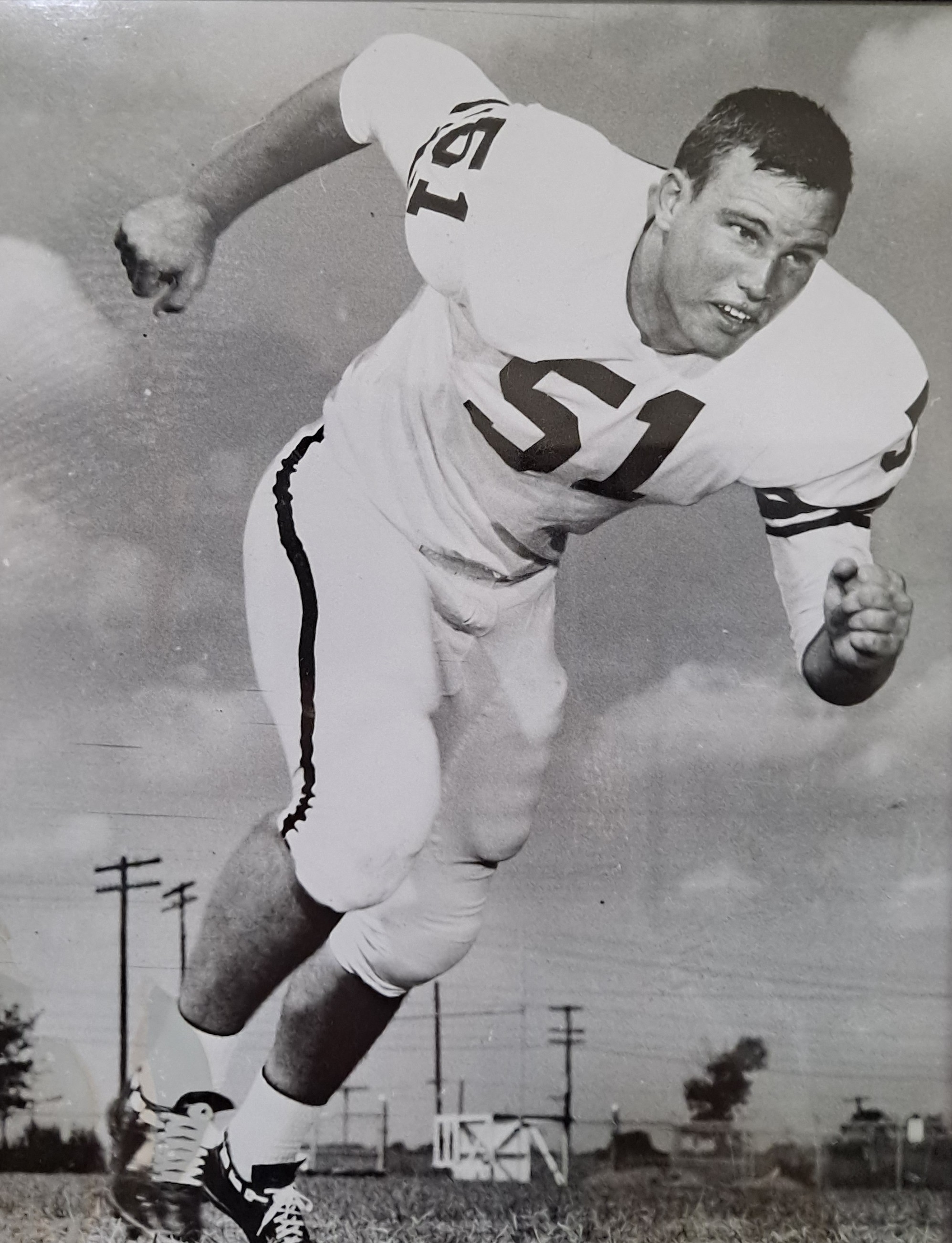
- Ray at Texas A&M

No. 52, 77
- Position: Center

Personal information
- Born: October 26, 1942; West, Texas, U.S.
- Died: August 30, 2018 (aged 75); Round Rock, Texas, U.S.
- Listed height: 6 ft 5 in (1.96 m)
- Listed weight: 265 lb (120 kg)

Career information
- High school: West (TX)
- College: Texas A&M (1960-1963)
- NFL draft: 1964: 4th round, 46th overall pick
- AFL draft: 1964: 7th round, 49th overall pick

Career history
- Denver Broncos (1964–1967)

Awards and highlights
- Second-team All-American (1963)

Career AFL statistics
- Games played: 41
- Games started: 21
- Fumble recoveries: 1
- Stats at Pro Football Reference

Raymond George Kubala (October 26, 1942 – August 30, 2018) was an American professional football player. He played college football at Texas A&M where he was selected by the American Football Coaches Association (AFCA) as the second-team center on the 1963 College Football All-America Team. He played for the Denver Broncos from 1964 to 1967.
