= Marcel Deleeuw =

Profile
- Positions: Punter, Running back

Personal information
- Born: 1943/11/6; Netherlands
- Listed height: 5 ft 11 in (1.80 m)
- Listed weight: 180 lb (82 kg)

Career information
- College: Edmonton Wildcats junior

Career history
- 1964–1965: Edmonton Eskimos
- 1971: Ottawa Rough Riders

Marcel Deleeuw was a football player in the Canadian Football League for three years, mostly serving as a punter.

After playing junior football for the Edmonton Wildcats, Marcel Deleeuw joined the Edmonton Eskimos in 1964 as their regular punter, replacing Aubrey Linne. Deleeuw punted for a 38.0 average and no single point. However, the following year he was replaced as the punter and mostly served as a punt returner. He only came back in 1971 as the punter of the Ottawa Rough Riders when his average increased to 42.5 yards per punt. However, he did not play another season.
