= Jerry Richardson (defensive back) =

American football player (born 1941)

No. 43
- Position: Defensive back

Personal information
- Born: November 13, 1941 (age 84); Los Angeles, California, U.S.
- Listed height: 6 ft 3 in (1.91 m)
- Listed weight: 190 lb (86 kg)

Career information
- High school: Canyon
- College: West Texas A&M
- NFL draft: 1964: 3rd round, 35th overall pick
- AFL draft: 1964: 7th round, 54th overall pick

Career history
- Los Angeles Rams (1964–1965); Atlanta Falcons (1966–1967); San Diego Chargers (1968)*
- * Offseason or practice squad member only

Career NFL statistics
- Interceptions: 11
- Fumble recoveries: 2
- Sacks: 1
- Stats at Pro Football Reference

Jerry Bert Richardson (born November 13, 1941) is an American former professional football player who was a defensive back for four seasons in the National Football League (NFL). He played college football for the West Texas A&M Buffaloes and was selected by the Los Angeles Rams in the third round of the 1964 NFL draft, and selected by the Denver Broncos of the American Football League (AFL) in the seventh round of the 1964 AFL draft. He played two seasons with the Rams and two with the Atlanta Falcons.
