= Roger Pillath =

American football player (born 1941)

No. 72, 58
- Position: Offensive tackle

Personal information
- Born: December 21, 1941 (age 84); Marinette, Wisconsin, U.S.
- Listed height: 6 ft 4 in (1.93 m)
- Listed weight: 242 lb (110 kg)

Career information
- High school: Coleman (Coleman, Wisconsin)
- College: Wisconsin (1960-1963)
- NFL draft: 1964: 3rd round, 39th overall pick
- AFL draft: 1964: 7th round, 53rd overall pick

Career history
- Los Angeles Rams (1965); Pittsburgh Steelers (1966); Detroit Lions (1967)*
- * Offseason or practice squad member only

Career NFL statistics
- Games played: 20
- Games started: 7
- Fumble recoveries: 1
- Stats at Pro Football Reference

Roger Allen Pillath (born December 21, 1941) is an American former professional football player who was an offensive tackle in the National Football League (NFL) for the Los Angeles Rams (1965) and Pittsburgh Steelers (1966). He played college football for the Wisconsin Badgers.

== Biography ==
Roger Allan Pillath was born on December 21, 1941, in Marinette, Wisconsin.

== See also ==
- List of Pittsburgh Steelers players
