= John Varnell =

American football player and educator

John Varnell (May 13, 1941 – October 30, 2011) was an American football player and educator. He played defensive end and many other positions under coach Joe Kerbel at West Texas State University (WTSU) and later went on to play professionally. Varnell was elected captain of the 1962 West Texas State Buffaloes football team that went 9–2 and won the Sun Bowl over Ohio.

After playing in the Southwest Challenge Bowl in Corpus Christi, Texas, and the East–West Shrine Bowl in San Francisco, he entered the 1964 pro football draft where he was selected with the 33rd pick by the Houston Oilers in the American Football League (AFL) and the 91st pick in the National Football League (NFL) by the Los Angeles Rams.

After the 1964 season, there was a coaching change in Houston and Varnell chose to move to the NFL and play for the Rams who had also drafted him in the previous year. He broke his neck in the preseason and never played in a regular season game for the Rams. While recovering from the neck injury, and still under contract by the Rams, Varnell was recruited by the Toronto Argonauts to play in the Canadian Football League (CFL). An arrangement was made to compensate the Rams to release Varnell from his contract and Varnell went to Canada. The Argonauts finished –9 that year and Varnell had an unfortunate career ending knee injury.

After an injury plagued professional football career in 1966, Varnell returned to Texas to complete his Bachelor of Science at WTSU. Later, he completed his Master of Science at Sul Ross State University in 1976. He coached football and other sports while teaching mathematics, geometry, and physics in many Texas High Schools and one college, including Amarillo High, Springlake-Earth, Tulia, Big Spring, Ector High School in Odessa, Thomas Jefferson, Spruce, Woodrow Wilson, and South Oak Cliff in Dallas, Texas. While teaching and coaching at Woodrow Wilson in 1996, Varnell was selected to the publication Who's Who Among America's Teachers.

Varnell died on October 30, 2011 in Denton, Texas.
