= 1964 All-Pro Team =

Official list of the best NFL players in 1964

The following is a list of players that were named to the Associated Press All-Pro Team in the NFL in 1964. Players from the first and second teams are listed, with players from the first team in bold, where applicable.

== Teams ==
Offense
Position	Players
Quarterbacks	**Johnny Unitas**, Baltimore Colts; Bart Starr, Green Bay Packers
Running backs	**Lenny Moore**, Halfback, Baltimore Colts; **Jim Brown**, Fullback, Cleveland Browns; Bill Brown, Fullback, Minnesota Vikings; Charley Taylor, Halfback, Washington Redskins
Wide receivers	**Johnny Morris**, Flanker, Chicago Bears; **Frank Clarke**, Flanker, Dallas Cowboys; Bobby Mitchell, Flanker, Washington Redskins; Gail Cogdill, Split End, Detroit Lions
Tight ends	**Mike Ditka**, Chicago Bears; Pete Retzlaff, Philadelphia Eagles
Tackles	**Dick Schafrath**, Left, Cleveland Browns; **Forrest Gregg**, Right, Green Bay Packers; Bob Brown, Right, Philadelphia Eagles; George Preas, Right, Baltimore Colts
Guards	**Jim Parker**, Left, Baltimore Colts; **Ken Gray**, Right, St. Louis Cardinals; John Gordy, Right, Detroit Lions; Alex Sandusky, Right, Baltimore Colts
Centers	**Mick Tingelhoff**, Minnesota Vikings; Jim Ringo, Philadelphia Eagles

Defense
Position	Players
Defensive ends	**Willie Davis**, Left, Green Bay Packers; **Gino Marchetti**, Left, Baltimore Colts; Deacon Jones, Left, Los Angeles Rams; John Paluck, Right, Washington Redskins
Defensive tackles	**Henry Jordan**, Right, Green Bay Packers; **Bob Lilly**, Right, Dallas Cowboys; Alex Karras, Left, Detroit Lions; Merlin Olsen, Left, Los Angeles Rams
Outside Linebackers	**Joe Fortunato**, Chicago Bears; **Maxie Baughan**, Philadelphia Eagles; Matt Hazeltine, San Francisco 49ers Wayne Walker, Detroit Lions
Inside/Middle Linebackers	**Ray Nitschke**, Green Bay Packers; Bill Pellington, Baltimore Colts
Cornerbacks	**Bobby Boyd**, Left, Baltimore Colts; **Pat Fischer**, Left, St. Louis Cardinals; Herb Adderley, Left, Green Bay Packers; Dick LeBeau, Left, Detroit Lions; Bernie Parrish, Left, Cleveland Browns
Safeties	**Willie Wood**, Left, Green Bay Packers; **Paul Krause**, Right, Washington Redskins; Mel Renfro, Right, Dallas Cowboys
