= 1964 Minnesota Vikings season =

NFL team season

- General manager: Jim Finks
- Head coach: Norm Van Brocklin
- Home stadium: Metropolitan Stadium

Results
- Record: 8–5–1
- Division place: T-2nd NFL Western
- Playoffs: Did not qualify
- All-Pros: FB Bill Brown (2nd team); C Mick Tingelhoff (1st team)
- Pro Bowlers: T Grady Alderman; FB Bill Brown; RB Tommy Mason; QB Fran Tarkenton; C Mick Tingelhoff

Uniform
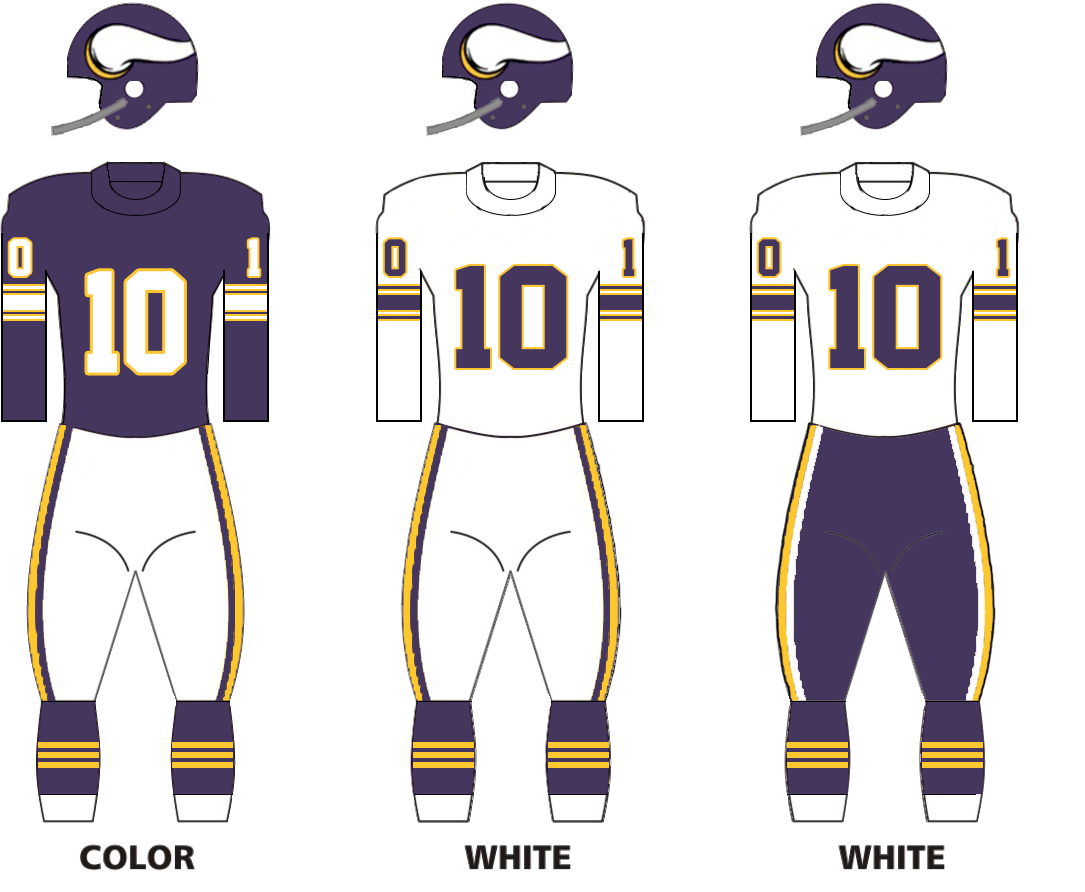

The 1964 season was the Minnesota Vikings' fourth in the National Football League. Under head coach Norm Van Brocklin, the team finished with an 8–5–1 record for their first winning season and a franchise-best until 1969. They tied with the Green Bay Packers for second place in the Western conference, who gained the berth in the third-place Playoff Bowl in Miami on January 3. The two teams had split their season series, with the road teams winning, but the Packers won the tiebreaker on point differential: the Vikings' victory was by just one point, while Green Bay won by over four touchdowns. In the season opener, the Vikings upset eventual Western champion Baltimore.

To date, this is the only season the Vikings wore white jerseys for all their home games. In January 1964, the NFL owners had approved a new rule which allowed home teams to wear the jersey color of their choice.

This was the first season for the forty-man roster, an increase of three.

== Offseason ==
=== 1964 draft ===
Pro Bowler
Hall of Famer

1964 Minnesota Vikings Draft
Draft order		Player name	Position	College	Notes
Round	Selection	Player name	Position	College	Notes
1	6	Carl Eller	Defensive tackle	Minnesota	
2	19	Hal Bedsole	Wide receiver	USC	
3	34	George Rose	Running back	Auburn	
4	47	Traded to the Chicago Bears (Note: The Vikings traded their fourth-round selection (47th overall) to the Bears in exchange for RB Bill Brown.)			
4	53	Tom Keating	Defensive tackle	Michigan	from Giants (Note: The Vikings traded RB Hugh McElhenny to the Giants in exchange for a fourth-round selection (53rd overall) and a 1965 second-round selection (15th overall).)
5	62	John Kirby	Linebacker	Nebraska	
6	75	Bob Lacey	Wide receiver	North Carolina	
7	90	Wes Bryant	Defensive tackle	Arkansas	
8	103	Bill McWatters	Fullback	North Texas State	
9	118	Darrell Lester	Fullback	McNeese State	
10	131	Traded to the Los Angeles Rams (Note: The Vikings traded their 10th-round selection (131st overall) to the Rams in exchange for RB Tommy Wilson.)			
11	146	H. O. Estes	Guard	East Central State	
12	159	Sandy Sands	Wide receiver	Texas	
13	174	Russ Vollmer	Running back	Memphis State	
14	187	Tom Michel	Running back	East Carolina	
15	202	Monte Kiffin	Defensive tackle	Nebraska	
16	215	Carleton Oats	Wide receiver	Florida A&M	
17	230	Jerry McClurg	Wide receiver	Colorado	
18	243	Carl Robinson	Defensive tackle	Prairie View A&M	
19	258	Dick Schott	Wide receiver	Louisville	
20	271	Milt Sunde	Offensive tackle	Minnesota	

== Roster ==
1964 Minnesota Vikings roster
Quarterbacks (QB): 10 Fran Tarkenton; 15 Ron Vander Kelen; Running backs (RB): 30 Bill Brown; 31 Darrell Lester; 20 Tommy Mason; 32 Bill McWatters; Wide receivers (WR): 85 Paul Flatley; 28 Tom Hall; 88 Bob Lacey; 89 Jerry Reichow; Tight ends (TE): 86 Hal Bedsole; 87 Gordon Smith	Offensive linemen (OL): 67 Grady Alderman T; 61 Larry Bowie G; 66 Ken Byers G; 73 Errol Linden T; 74 Dave O'Brien T; 69 Palmer Pyle G; 64 Milt Sunde G; 53 Mick Tingelhoff C; Defensive linemen (DL): 62 Bob Denton DE; 76 Paul Dickson DT; 81 Carl Eller DE; 70 Jim Marshall DE; 79 Jim Prestel DT; 78 Howard Simpson DE	Linebackers (LB): 55 John Campbell OLB; 58 Rip Hawkins MLB; 36 John Kirby OLB; 52 Bill Swain OLB; 60 Roy Winston OLB; Defensive backs (DB): 22 Bill Butler FS; 29 Karl Kassulke SS; 44 George Rose CB; 45 Ed Sharockman CB; 83 Larry Vargo FS/WR; Special teams (ST): 14 Fred Cox K; 39 Bobby Walden P	Practice squad: Lonnie Warwick LB; Reserve: 23 Lee Calland CB (IR); 33 Ted Dean RB (IR); 40 Tom Franckhauser CB/S (IR); 57 Bill Jobko LB (IR); -- Monte Kiffin DE (IR); 21 Tom Michel RB (IR); Rookies in italics

== Preseason ==
Game	Date	Opponent	Result	Record	Venue	Attendance	Sources
1	August 8	New York Giants	W 21–7	1–0	Metropolitan Stadium	31,581	
2	August 15	St. Louis Cardinals	W 24–10	2–0	Cheney Stadium (Atlanta, GA)	10,000	
3	August 22	San Francisco 49ers	W 24–21	3–0	Ute Stadium (Salt Lake City, UT)	20,207	
4	August 29	at Los Angeles Rams	W 34–23	4–0	L.A. Memorial Coliseum	39,938	
5	September 5	at Philadelphia Eagles	W 21–20	5–0	Hershey Stadium (Hershey, PA)	9,212	

== Regular season ==
=== Schedule ===
Game	Date	Opponent	Result	Record	Venue	Attendance	Recap	Sources
1	September 13	**Baltimore Colts**	**W** 34–24	1–0	Metropolitan Stadium	35,563	Recap	
2	September 20	**Chicago Bears**	**L** 28–34	1–1	Metropolitan Stadium	41,387	Recap	
3	September 27	at **Los Angeles Rams**	**L** 13–22	1–2	L.A. Memorial Coliseum	50,009	Recap	
4	October 4	at **Green Bay Packers**	**W** 24–23	2–2	City Stadium	42,327	Recap	
5	October 11	**Detroit Lions**	**L** 20–24	2–3	Metropolitan Stadium	40,840	Recap	
6	October 18	Pittsburgh Steelers	**W** 30–10	3–3	Metropolitan Stadium	39,873	Recap	
7	October 25	at **San Francisco 49ers**	**W** 27–22	4–3	Kezar Stadium	31,845	Recap	
8	November 1	**Green Bay Packers**	**L** 13–42	4–4	Metropolitan Stadium	44,278	Recap	
9	November 8	**San Francisco 49ers**	**W** 24–7	5–4	Metropolitan Stadium	40,408	Recap	
10	November 15	at **Baltimore Colts**	**L** 14–17	5–5	Memorial Stadium	60,213	Recap	
11	November 22	at **Detroit Lions**	**T** 23–23	5–5–1	Tiger Stadium	48,291	Recap	
12	November 29	**Los Angeles Rams**	**W** 34–13	6–5–1	Metropolitan Stadium	31,677	Recap	
13	December 6	at New York Giants	**W** 30–21	7–5–1	Yankee Stadium	62,802	Recap	
14	December 13	at **Chicago Bears**	**W** 41–14	8–5–1	Wrigley Field	46,486	Recap	
Note: Intra-division opponents are in **bold** text.

=== Game summaries ===
==== Week 7: vs. San Francisco 49ers ====
The Vikings defeated the 49ers 27–22 on October 25 in San Francisco at Kezar Stadium, but not before defensive end Jim Marshall made one of the most embarrassing errors in NFL history. In the fourth quarter, 49er halfback Billy Kilmer caught a pass from rookie quarterback George Mira and fumbled the ball forward, which was scooped up in stride by Marshall. He unknowingly ran 66 yards with it the wrong way into his own end zone; thinking he scored a touchdown, he tossed the ball in the air throwing it out of bounds, resulting in a safety. The Vikings had a 27–17 lead at the time, and it narrowed the gap to eight points.

On the previous possession, Marshall had forced a Mira fumble in the collapsing pocket and defensive end Carl Eller had scooped up the loose ball and ran it back 45 yards for a touchdown. Just before that, Viking linebacker Roy Winston had intercepted a Mira pass early in the fourth quarter and returned it to the 49er eleven-yard line, setting up a touchdown run by quarterback Fran Tarkenton to take the lead. Two weeks later in Minnesota, the Vikings defeated the 49ers again, by a score of 24–7.

- YouTube – NFL Films – Jim Marshall's Wrong Way Run

== Standings ==
NFL Western Conference
	W	L	T	PCT	CONF	PF	PA	STK
Baltimore Colts	12	2	0	.857	10–2	428	225	W1
Green Bay Packers (Note: Green Bay was awarded the Playoff Bowl berth from the Western Conference by outscoring Minnesota 65–37 in their two meetings.)	8	5	1	.615	6–5–1	342	245	T1
Minnesota Vikings	8	5	1	.615	6–5–1	355	296	W3
Detroit Lions	7	5	2	.583	6–4–2	280	260	W2
Los Angeles Rams	5	7	2	.417	3–7–2	283	339	T1
Chicago Bears	5	9	0	.357	5–7	260	379	L2
San Francisco 49ers	4	10	0	.286	3–9	236	330	L1

Note: Tie games were not officially counted in the standings until 1972.

== Statistics ==
=== Team leaders ===
Category	Player(s)	Value
Passing yards	Fran Tarkenton	2,506
Passing touchdowns	Fran Tarkenton	22
Rushing yards	Bill Brown	866
Rushing touchdowns	Bill Brown	7
Receiving yards	Bill Brown	703
Receiving touchdowns	Bill Brown	9
Points	Fred Cox	103
Kickoff return yards	Bill Butler	597
Punt return yards	Bill Butler	156
Interceptions	George Rose	6
Sacks	Jim Marshall	11.5

Note that sack totals from 1960 to 1981 are considered unofficial by the NFL.

=== League rankings ===
Category	Total yards	Yards per game	NFL rank (out of 14)
Passing offense	2,123	151.6	11th
Rushing offense	2,183	155.9	2nd
Total offense	4,306	307.6	6th
Passing defense	2,724	194.6	13th
Rushing defense	1,616	115.4	5th
Total defense	4,340	310.0	10th
