= 1964 NFL Championship Game =

Coordinates: 41.506°N 81.700°W

- Official game program
Baltimore Colts (Western) (12–2)	Cleveland Browns (Eastern) (10–3–1)
0	27
Head coach: Don Shula	Head coach: Blanton Collier
	1	2	3	4	Total
BAL	0	0	0	0	0
CLE	0	0	17	10	27
- Date: December 27, 1964
- Stadium: Cleveland Municipal Stadium; Cleveland, Ohio
- MVP: Gary Collins (Wide Receiver; Cleveland)
- Favorite: Baltimore by 7 points
- Attendance: 79,544

TV in the United States
- Network: CBS
- Announcers: Ken Coleman; Chuck Thompson; Frank Gifford
- Nielsen ratings: 28.2

Radio in the United States
- Network: CBS
- Announcers: Jack Drees; Jim Morse

Location in the United States

The 1964 NFL Championship Game was the 32nd annual championship game, held on December 27 at Cleveland Municipal Stadium in Cleveland, Ohio. With an attendance of 79,544, it was the first NFL title game to be televised by CBS.

The game marked the last championship won by a major-league professional sports team from Cleveland until 2016, when the Cleveland Cavaliers won the NBA Finals. Through 2025, this is the Browns' most recent league title. The team had a replica Ed Thorp Memorial Trophy created for display in 2004.

== Background ==
The Baltimore Colts finished the 1964 regular season with a record of 12–2 and handily won the Western Conference for the first time since 1959, clinching the title with three games remaining; the runner-up Green Bay Packers were at 8–5–1. The Colts were led by second-year head coach Don Shula and quarterback Johnny Unitas. This was the Colts' third NFL championship game appearance since joining the National Football League in 1953, seeking to win their first since repeating in 1959.

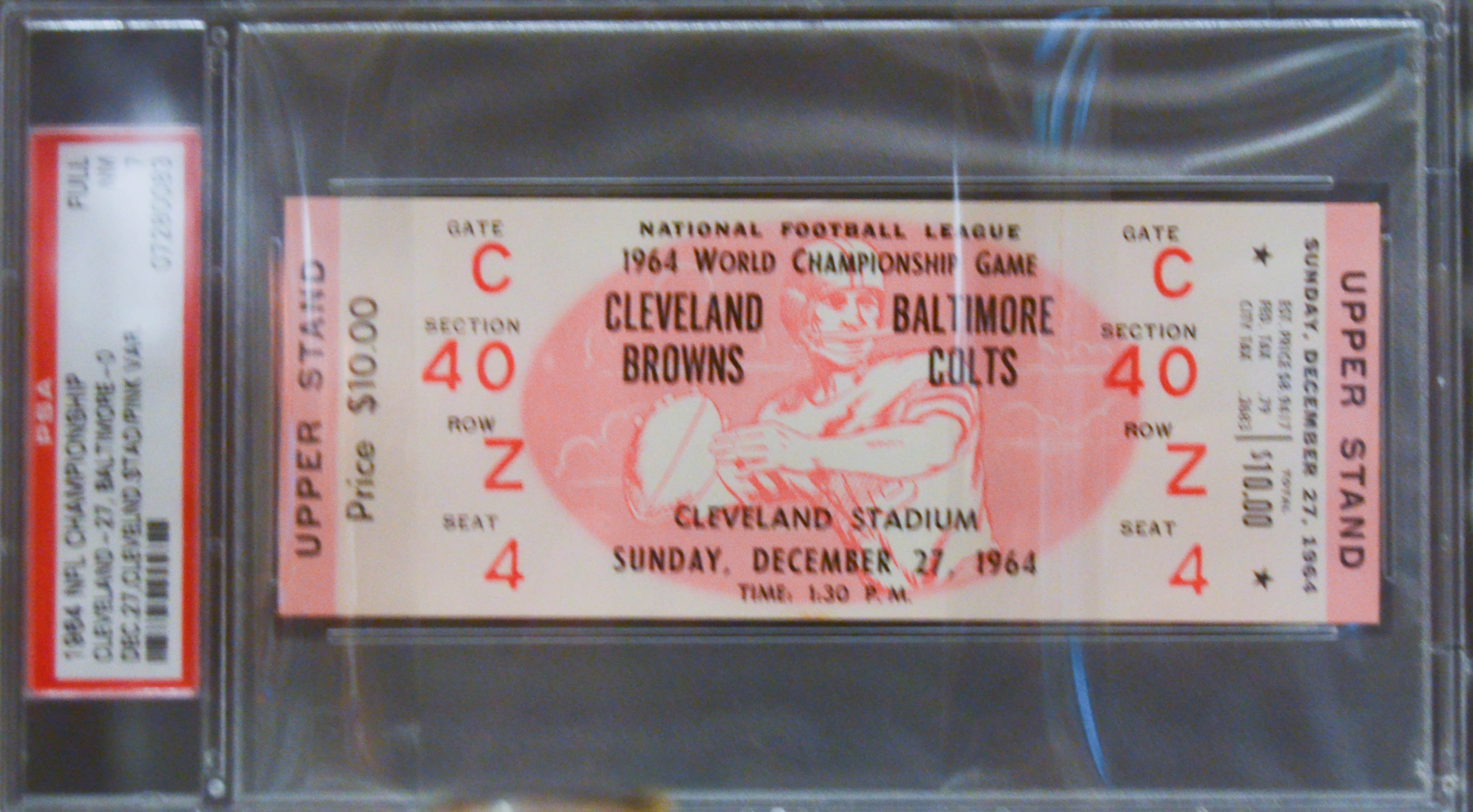
Ticket for the 1964 NFL Championship Game.

The Cleveland Browns finished the regular season with a record of 10–3–1, winning the Eastern Conference by a half game over the St. Louis Cardinals at 9–3–2. The Browns were led by second-year head coach Blanton Collier, quarterback Frank Ryan, running back Jim Brown, and receivers Gary Collins and rookie Paul Warfield. This was the Browns' eighth NFL championship game appearance since joining the NFL in 1950, but the first in seven years.

Ticket prices for the championship game were six, eight, and ten dollars, and the Colts were seven-point favorites on the road.

== Game summary ==
The first half went scoreless, as both teams struggled to move the ball with a light snow and driving wind hampering their efforts. Baltimore drove to midfield but lost the ball on a fumble by fullback Jerry Hill. The Browns then moved to the Colt 35 but Paul Warfield slipped going for a Ryan pass and the ball was intercepted by Colt linebacker Don Shinnick. As the second quarter began, Baltimore had moved deep into Browns territory. The Colts attempted a 27-yard field goal by Lou Michaels, but holder Bobby Boyd had to reach for the snap from center and was hauled down behind the line of scrimmage. Near the end of the first half, Unitas got another drive going into Cleveland territory. However, from the Brown 46 he threw slightly behind tight end John Mackey, who could only deflect the pass; it was intercepted by Vince Costello. The scoreless first half ended after Ryan missed on a long pass to Warfield.

Having held their own with Baltimore in the first half, the Browns changed their offensive and defensive tactics. With the wind at his back, Browns' kicker Lou Groza booted the second half kickoff well beyond the end zone. The Cleveland rush put pressure on Unitas and the Colts had to punt into the wind. With good field position at the Colt 48, the Browns got a first down on a screen pass to running back Jim Brown. The Colt defense stiffened and Groza kicked a field goal from the 43. Baltimore could not move and the Browns went on the attack again. From the Cleveland 36, Brown took a pitchout around the left side and nearly went all the way. Safety Jerry Logan finally hauled him down from behind at the Colt 18. Ryan dropped back and fired a pass between the goalposts to the leaping Gary Collins for the game's first touchdown and a 10–0 lead. The momentum had clearly swung to home underdog Cleveland.

Baltimore's Tony Lorick made the bad decision to run the kickoff out of the end zone and was tackled at the Baltimore 11. A clipping penalty moved the Colts back further and they soon had to punt again into the stiff wind. The kick went out of bounds on the Baltimore 39 and Ryan went right back to work. The Browns lost yardage on a broken reverse play, but Ryan dropped back from the 42 and found Collins all alone down the middle at the five; the big flanker waltzed into the end zone and the Browns were up 17–0.

Unitas finally got the Colts across midfield against the aroused Browns defense, but running back Lenny Moore fumbled a handoff at the Cleveland 47 and the Browns recovered. Brown rumbled 23 yards with another pitchout to the Colt 14 as the third quarter ended. Ryan hit Warfield at the one-yard line but the Colts then held. Groza hit a short field goal from a sharp angle to the right to make the score 20–0. Baltimore's troubles continued as Unitas threw deep to Jimmy Orr on the sidelines at the Cleveland 15, but Orr could not get the ball under control before he fell out of bounds, and they had to punt again. The Browns moved to their 49 and Ryan threw deep to Collins. With defensive back Boyd all over him, Collins made the catch at the Colt 10, kept his balance, and scored for the third time. As the fourth quarter wound down and with the Browns on the move again, the game was halted with 27 seconds remaining, as thousands of fans surged onto the field.

The Browns dominated the statistics over the favored Colts. Unitas completed 12 of 20 passes for only 95 yards with two interceptions. The Colts managed only 92 yards rushing. Ryan hit on 11 of 18 tosses for 206 yards and three TDs. The Browns' Collins set a title game record with three touchdown catches in one game, and grabbed five passes for 130 yards total. Groza kicked field goals of 42 and 10 yards, and Brown carried the ball 27 times for 114 yards.

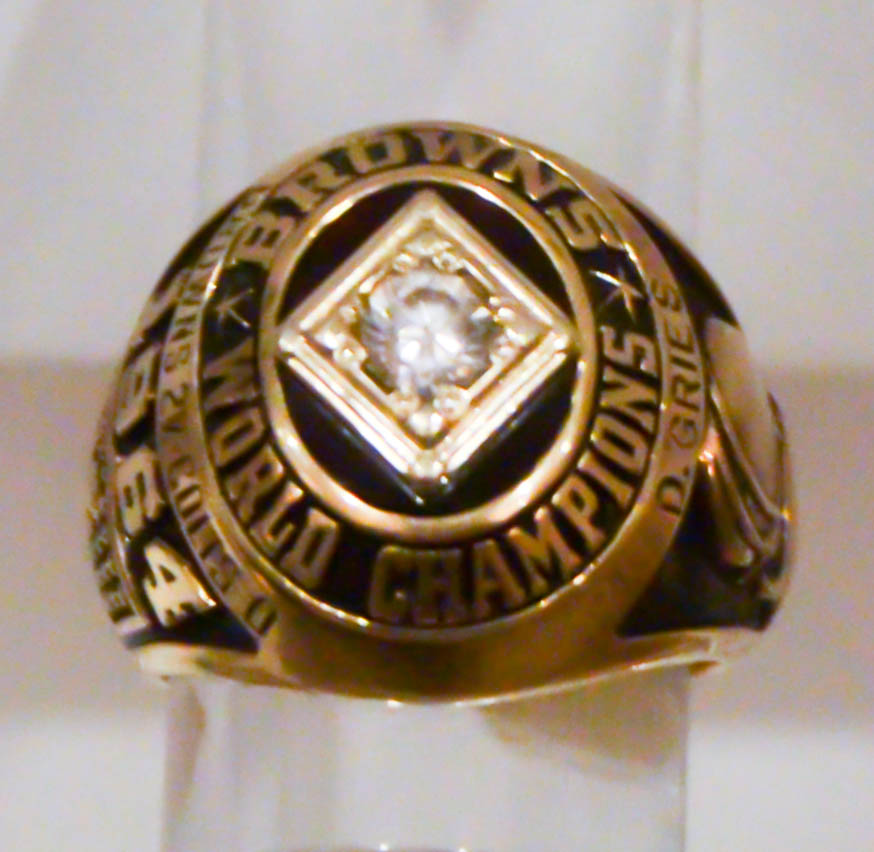
Browns' championship ring

=== Scoring summary ===
Cleveland Browns 27, Baltimore Colts 0

Quarter	1	2	3	4	Total
Colts	0	0	0	0	0
Browns	0	0	17	10	27

at Cleveland Municipal Stadium, Cleveland, Ohio

- Date: December 27, 1964
- Game weather: 34 °F (1 °C), wind 15 mph (24 km/h), wind chill 23 °F (−5 °C), relative humidity 75%
- Game attendance: 79,544
- TV announcers (CBS): Ken Coleman, Chuck Thompson, Frank Gifford
- Pro-Football-Reference.com

Game information
- First quarter
  - no scoring
- Second quarter
  - no scoring
- Third quarter
  - CLE – Lou Groza 43-yard field goal. Browns 3–0
  - CLE – Gary Collins 18-yard pass from Frank Ryan (Groza kick). Browns 10–0
  - CLE – Gary Collins 42-yard pass from Frank Ryan (Groza kick). Browns 17–0
- Fourth quarter
  - CLE – Lou Groza 9-yard field goal. Browns 20–0
  - CLE – Gary Collins 51-yard pass from Frank Ryan (Groza kick). Browns 27–0

Top passers

- BAL – Johnny Unitas – 12/20, 95 yards, 2 INT
- CLE – Frank Ryan – 11/18, 206 yards, 3 TD, 1 INT

Top rushers

- BAL – Lenny Moore – 9 rushes, 40 yards
- CLE – Jim Brown – 27 rushes, 114 yards

Top receivers

- BAL – Raymond Berry – 3 receptions, 38 yards
- CLE – Gary Collins – 5 receptions, 130 yards, 3 TD

== Officials ==
- Referee: (56) Norm Schachter
- Umpire: (57) Joe Connell
- Head linesman: (30) George Murphy
- Back judge: (25) Tom Kelleher
- Field judge: (16) Mike Lisetski

- Alternate: (52) George Rennix
- Alternate: (29) Stan Javie

The NFL had five game officials in 1964; the line judge was added in 1965 and the side judge in 1978.

This was also the last NFL Championship Game televised in black-and-white, as well as the last game in which penalty flags in NFL games were white. The league switched to bright yellow flags the next season.

== Players' shares ==
The gate receipts for the game were about $635,000 and the television money was $1.9 million. Each player on the winning Browns team received about $8,000, while Colts players made around $5,000 each. This was about triple the amount for the players' shares in the AFL championship game.

== See also ==
- 1964 NFL season
- History of the NFL championship
- 1964 AFL Championship Game
