= Bobby Smith (defensive back) =

American football player (born 1938)

No. 23, 43
- Position: Cornerback

Personal information
- Born: July 5, 1938 (age 88); Plain Dealing, Louisiana, U.S.
- Listed height: 5 ft 11 in (1.80 m)
- Listed weight: 197 lb (89 kg)

Career information
- High school: Compton (Compton, California)
- College: UCLA
- NFL draft: 1961: 7th round, 88th overall pick
- AFL draft: 1961: 26th round, 205th overall pick

Career history
- Los Angeles Rams (1962–1965); Detroit Lions (1965)

Awards and highlights
- First-team All-PCC (1961)

Career NFL statistics
- Interceptions: 5
- Fumble recoveries: 1
- Touchdowns: 2
- Stats at Pro Football Reference

Robert Lee Smith (born July 5, 1938) is an American former professional football player who was a cornerback and safety in the National Football League (NFL). After playing college football for the UCLA Bruins, he played in the NFL for the Los Angeles Rams (1962–1965) and the Detroit Lions (1965–1966). He was also a kick and punt returner.

== Early life ==
Smith was born on July 5, 1938, in Plain Dealing, Louisiana. He attended Compton High School, in Compton, California. Smith played on Compton's football and basketball teams, and was a broad jumper, high jumper, and hurdler on its track and field team. At the time, Smith was reported to be 6 ft ½ in (1.84 m) and 175 lb (79.4 kg) as a senior. As a professional payer, he was reported to be 5 ft 11 in (1.80 m).

Smith played offense, defense, and was a kicker on the football team. As a sophomore in 1954, he led Compton to the Coast League football championship as its star running halfback. He was injured during his junior year in 1955, with a clot in his leg, and missed all but two football games. In the spring of 1956, he tied for the California Interscholastic Federation (CIF), southern section, title in the broad jump, and was CIF champion in 1957. He was also an All-League basketball player for Compton. Smith was twice All-Coast League in both football and track.

In 2018, he was inducted into Compton High School’s Hall of Fame.

== College career ==
Smith attended Compton Junior College in 1957. He played on its football team in the Western State Conference (WSC), and was first-team All-WSC at running back in 1957. He was voted the team's outstanding back that season.

Smith transferred to the University of California, Los Angeles (UCLA) in 1959. He played the second most minutes of any sophomore on the Bruins football team that season. As a sophomore he was a backup to Billy Kilmer at quarterback. He had 289 rushing yards (second to Kilmer) in 93 carries with one rushing touchdown; and completed seven of 15 passes for 90 yards.

As a junior running back in 1960, Smith had 281 yards on 54 carries for the Bruins. As a senior in 1961, playing quarterback and tailback, Smith had 631 yards on 166 carries and nine rushing touchdowns. He passed for 305 yards and had one passing touchdown, on 16 completions in 33 pass attempts. He led the AAWU conference (Athletic Association of Western Universities, now the PAC-12) in points scored, rushing attempts and touchdowns; and was second in rushing yards behind teammate Mike Haffner. He was unanimously selected first-team All-AAWU at tailback in 1961. The Bruins lost to the University of Minnesota, 21–3, in the January 1, 1962 Rose Bowl game. Smith scored UCLA's only points in that game by kicking a field goal. Smith had 22 yards passing and eight yards rushing in the Rose Bowl.

He was also a broad jumper on UCLA's track team. He was reported to have run the 100-yard dash in 9.9 seconds.

== Professional career ==
The Los Angeles Rams selected Smith in the seventh round of the 1961 NFL draft, 88th overall. That draft took place at the end of December 1960. The New York Titans selected him in the 26th round of the 1961 AFL draft, 205th overall. The AFL draft occurred in early December 1960. Smith played another year at UCLA (1961), rather than entering professional football, choosing to play for the Rams in 1962.

The Rams drafted Smith as a defensive back, and in training camp the Rams believed he would be the only rookie to make the team's starting line up in 1962. The 24-year old Smith started nine games for the Rams at free safety in 1962, and was joined by fellow rookies Carver Shannon and future Hall of Fame tackle Merlin Olsen as defensive starters during the season. He intercepted one pass that season which he returned for 44 or 47 yards, against Milt Plum and the Detroit Lions in a mid-October game; setting up the Rams only touchdown in that game. He also returned one punt and two kickoffs that season.

In 1963, Smith started all 14 games at right cornerback, with two interceptions. In 1964, he started 12 games at strong safety and right cornerback, with two interceptions. He returned an interception 97 yards for a touchdown on October 18 against the San Francisco 49ers, tying a Rams record for longest interception return. In 1964, Smith also returned 12 punts for 68 yards, and 20 kickoffs for 489 yards. In a late October game against the Green Bay Packers, teammate Ed Meador blocked a Paul Hornung field goal attempt, and Smith recovered the ball and returned it 94 yards for the game-winning touchdown.

Smith started five games in the Rams defensive backfield in 1965. He also returned 9 punts for 56 yards and 17 kickoffs for 457 yards. In an October 31 game against the Detroit Lions, Smith fumbled the opening kickoff, which the Lions recovered, scoring a touchdown one play later. In the third quarter of the same game, Smith fumbled a punt return that the Lions recovered and turned into another touchdown. The Rams released Smith before their next game, and he was acquired by the Lions off of waivers in early November. Smith was a reserve defensive back in six games with the Lions, returning one punt and one kickoff during the remainder of the 1965 season. In his final NFL season (1966), Smith was primarily a reserve defensive back, starting in three games. He was not used as a punt or kickoff returner that season.

Smith was selected by the New Orleans Saints in the 1967 expansion draft. He was in the Saints' training camp in 1967, but was cut by coach Tom Fears in late August.

== Personal life ==
Smith was director of UCLA's Upward Bound & Talent Search program from 1971 through 1982, that worked with disadvantaged students seeking to enroll at UCLA.
