= 1964 Green Bay Packers season =

NFL team season

- General manager: Vince Lombardi
- Head coach: Vince Lombardi
- Home stadium: City Stadium; Milwaukee County Stadium

Results
- Record: 8–5–1
- Division place: 2nd NFL Western
- Playoffs: Lost NFL Playoff Bowl (vs. Cardinals) 17–24

The 1964 Green Bay Packers season was their 46th season overall and their 44th season in the National Football League. The team was led by sixth-year head coach Vince Lombardi, and tied for second place in the Western Conference at 8–5–1.

The Packers opened the season in Green Bay with a promising win over the rival Chicago Bears, the defending NFL champions. They then lost four of six, including three home games, and were 3–4 midway through the season, falling twice to the Baltimore Colts. The first three losses were by a total of five points, but the fourth on October 25, to the Los Angeles Rams in Milwaukee, was by ten and came after building a 17–0 lead.

In the season's latter half, Green Bay won five of six and tied the Rams in the finale to end 3½ games behind the Colts (12–2) in the West, tied for second with Minnesota. Baltimore clinched the Western title on November 22, with three games remaining. Based on point differential in the season split with the Vikings, the Packers were awarded the runner-up slot in the Playoff Bowl, the consolation third place game in Miami played three weeks after the regular season, on January 3.

Green Bay had played in the previous season's Playoff Bowl and won decisively, which followed consecutive league titles in 1961 and 1962, and three straight appearances in the championship game. In the 1964 season's third-place game, the St. Louis Cardinals prevailed over the unmotivated Packers, 24–17.

The 1964 season was arguably the most disappointing for Lombardi as a head coach. Consecutive appearances in the consolation Playoff Bowl, and the loss, keyed Lombardi and the Packers to win three consecutive NFL titles; the latter two followed by victories in the first two Super Bowls. Since the playoff era began 93 years ago in 1933, no other team has won three straight NFL titles.

For the first time since 1950, the Packers did not play on Thanksgiving Day. In the previous thirteen seasons they had played the Detroit Lions at Tiger Stadium, and went 3–9–1 (.269); with Lombardi as head coach, the record was 2–2–1 (.500), which included the sole loss in 1962. Green Bay next played on Thanksgiving in 1970 at the Cotton Bowl, which was the franchise's first-ever loss to the Dallas Cowboys.

Hall of Fame right guard Jerry Kramer missed most of the season due to an intestinal condition. After multiple surgeries, it was rectified in May 1965 after sizable wood fragments from a teenage accident a dozen years earlier were removed.

== Offseason ==
=== NFL draft ===
Round	Pick	Player	Position	School
1	13	Lloyd Voss	Defensive end	Nebraska
2	27	Jon Morris	Center	Holy Cross
3	36	Ode Burrell	Back	Mississippi State
3	40	Joe O'Donnell	Guard	Michigan
3	41	Tommy Crutcher	Linebacker	TCU
4	44	Bob Long	Wide receiver	Wichita State
4	55	Paul Costa	Tackle	Notre Dame
5	60	Duke Carlisle	Quarterback	Texas
5	69	Steve Wright	Offensive tackle	Alabama
7	97	Dick Herzing	Tackle	Drake
8	111	Ken Bowman	Center	Wisconsin
9	125	John McDowell	Offensive Tackle	St. John's (MN)
10	139	Allen Jacobs	Back	Utah
11	153	Jack Petersen	Tackle	Nebraska-Omaha
12	167	Dwain Bean	Back	North Texas State
13	181	Jack Mauro	Tackle	Northern Michigan
14	195	Tom O'Grady	End	Northwestern
15	209	Alex Zerko	Tackle	Kent State
16	223	Andrew Ireland	Back	Utah
17	237	Len St. Jean	End	Northern Michigan
18	251	Mike Hicks	Guard	Marshall
19	265	John Baker	End	Norfolk State
20	279	Bill Curry	Center	Georgia Tech

- Yellow indicates a future Pro Bowl selection

== Roster ==
1964 Green Bay Packers roster
Quarterbacks (QB): 12 Zeke Bratkowski; 10 Dennis Claridge; 15 Bart Starr; Running backs (RB): 5 Paul Hornung; 25 Tom Moore; 22 Elijah Pitts; 31 Jim Taylor; Wide receivers (WR): 86 Boyd Dowler; 21 Bob Jeter; 80 Bob Long; 85 Max McGee; Tight ends (TE): 81 Marv Fleming; 88 Ron Kramer	Offensive linemen (OL): 57 Ken Bowman C; 75 Forrest Gregg T/G; 67 Dan Grimm G; 78 Norm Masters T; 73 John McDowell T/G; 76 Bob Skoronski T; 63 Fuzzy Thurston G; 72 Steve Wright T; Defensive linemen (DL): 82 Lionel Aldridge DE; 87 Willie Davis DE; 79 Dave Hanner DT; 74 Henry Jordan DT; 77 Ron Kostelnik DT; 71 Lloyd Voss DT/DE	Linebackers (LB): 61 Gene Breen OLB; 60 Lee Roy Caffey OLB; 37 Tommy Joe Crutcher MLB; 58 Dan Currie OLB; 66 Ray Nitschke MLB; 89 Dave Robinson OLB; Defensive backs (DB): 26 Herb Adderley CB; 40 Tom Brown CB/S; 46 Hank Gremminger SS; 43 Doug Hart SS/CB; 47 Jesse Whittenton CB; 24 Willie Wood FS; Special teams (ST): 23 Jerry Norton P	Reserve: 64 Jerry Kramer G (NF-Ill.); Rookies in italics

== Regular season ==
=== Schedule ===
Week	Date	Opponent	Result	Record	Venue	Attendance
1	September 13	**Chicago Bears**	**W** 23–12	1–0	City Stadium	42,327
2	September 20	**Baltimore Colts**	**L** 20–21	1–1	City Stadium	42,327
3	September 28	at **Detroit Lions**	**W** 14–10	2–1	Tiger Stadium	59,203
4	October 4	**Minnesota Vikings**	**L** 23–24	2–2	City Stadium	42,327
5	October 11	**San Francisco 49ers**	**W** 24–14	3–2	Milwaukee County Stadium	47,380
6	October 18	at **Baltimore Colts**	**L** 21–24	3–3	Memorial Stadium	60,213
7	October 25	**Los Angeles Rams**	**L** 17–27	3–4	Milwaukee County Stadium	47,617
8	November 1	at **Minnesota Vikings**	**W** 42–13	4–4	Metropolitan Stadium	44,278
9	November 6	**Detroit Lions**	**W** 30–7	5–4	City Stadium	42,327
10	November 15	at **San Francisco 49ers**	**L** 14–24	5–5	Kezar Stadium	38,483
11	November 22	Cleveland Browns	**W** 28–21	6–5	Milwaukee County Stadium	48,065
12	November 29	at Dallas Cowboys	**W** 45–21	7–5	Cotton Bowl	44,975
13	December 5	at **Chicago Bears**	**W** 17–3	8–5	Wrigley Field	43,636
14	December 13	at **Los Angeles Rams**	**T** 24–24	8–5–1	Los Angeles Memorial Coliseum	40,735
Note: Intra-conference opponents are in **bold** text.

=== Season summary ===
==== Week 1 vs Bears ====
Week One: Chicago Bears (0–0) at Green Bay Packers (0–0)

Quarter	1	2	3	4	Total
Bears	0	3	9	0	**12**
**Packers**	7	10	3	3	**23**

at City Stadium, Green Bay, Wisconsin

- Date: September 13, 1964
- Game weather: 53 °F (12 °C)
- Game attendance: 42,327
- Pro-Football-Reference.com

Game information

**First quarter**

- GB – Max McGee 11-yard pass from Bart Starr (Paul Hornung kick). Packers 7–0. Drive:

**Second quarter**

- CHI – Bob Jencks 8-yard field goal. Packers 7–3. Drive:
- GB – Tom Moore 33-yard pass from Bart Starr (Paul Hornung kick). Packers 14–3. Drive:
- GB – Paul Hornung 52-yard field goal. Packers 17–3. Drive:

**Third quarter**

- CHI – Bob Jencks 36-yard field goal. Packers 17–6. Drive:
- CHI – Mike Ditka 13-yard pass from Rudy Bukich (kick failed). Packers 17–12. Drive:
- GB – Paul Hornung 29-yard field goal. Packers 20–12. Drive:

**Fourth quarter**

- GB – Paul Hornung 20-yard field goal. Packers 23–12. Drive:

Top passers

- CHI – Rudy Bukich – 7/16, 83 yards, TD, 2 INT
- GB – Bart Starr – 8/16, 127 yards, 2 TD

Top rushers

- CHI – Ronnie Bull – 8 rushes, 25 yards
- GB – Jim Taylor – 16 rushes, 79 yards

Top receivers

- CHI – Mike Ditka – 7 receptions, 74 yards, TD
- GB – Ron Kramer – 3 receptions, 48 yards

==== Week 2 vs Colts ====
Baltimore Colts (0–1) at Green Bay Packers (1–0)

Quarter	1	2	3	4	Total
**Colts**	7	14	0	0	**21**
Packers	7	6	7	0	**20**

at New City Stadium, Green Bay, Wisconsin

- Date: September 20
- Game weather: 65 °F (18 °C)
- Game attendance: 42,327
- Box Score

Game information

**First quarter**

- BAL – Lenny Moore 52-yard pass from Johnny Unitas (Lou Michaels kick). Colts 7–0. Drive:
- GB – Paul Hornung 20-yard run (Paul Hornung kick). Tie 7–7. Drive:

**Second quarter**

- BAL – Lenny Moore 4-yard run (Lou Michaels kick). Colts 14–7. Drive:
- GB – Paul Hornung 4-yard run (kick failed). Colts 14–13. Drive:
- BAL – John Mackey 40-yard pass from Johnny Unitas (Lou Michaels kick). Colts 21–13. Drive:

**Third quarter**

- GB – Jim Taylor 23-yard run (Paul Hornung kick). Colts 21–20. Drive:

**Fourth quarter**

- No scoring

Top passers

- BAL – Johnny Unitas – 7/12, 154 yards, 2 TD
- GB – Bart Starr – 16/21, 175 yards, 3 INT

Top rushers

- BAL – Jerry Hill – 15 rushes, 49 yards
- GB – Jim Taylor – 18 rushes, 98 yards, TD

Top receivers

- BAL – Lenny Moore – 1 reception, 52 yards, TD
- GB – Boyd Dowler – 7 receptions, 66 yards

==== Week 11: vs. Cleveland Browns ====
Green Bay Packers 28, Cleveland Browns 21

Quarter	1	2	3	4	Total
Browns	14	0	0	7	**21**
**Packers**	7	0	14	7	**28**

at Milwaukee County Stadium in Milwaukee, Wisconsin

- Date: November 22, 1964
- Game time: 1:00 p.m. CST
- Game weather: 15 °F (−9 °C), wind 15 mph (24 km/h), wind chill 0 °F (−18 °C)
- Game attendance: 48,065
- TV announcers (CBS): Ken Coleman (CLE) (second half) and Earl Gillespie (GB) (first half) (play-by-play), Warren Lahr (CLE) (second half) and Tony Canadeo (GB) (first half) (color commentators)
- Pro-Football-Reference.com

Game information

First quarter

- CLE – Paul Warfield 48-yard pass from Frank Ryan (Lou Groza kick), CLE 7–0
- GB – Elijah Pitts 19-yard rush (Paul Hornung kick), tied 7–7
- CLE – Jim Brown 1-yard rush (Groza kick), CLE 14–7

Second quarter

- no scoring

Third quarter

- GB – Jim Taylor 1-yard rush – (Hornung kick), tied 14–14
- GB – Bart Starr 4-yard rush (Hornung kick), GB 21–14

Fourth quarter

- GB – Taylor 5-yard rush (Hornung kick), GB 28–14
- CLE – Warfield 19-yard pass from Ryan (Groza kick), GB 28–21

== Standings ==
NFL Western Conference
	W	L	T	PCT	CONF	PF	PA	STK
Baltimore Colts	12	2	0	.857	10–2	428	225	W1
Green Bay Packers (Note: Green Bay was awarded the Playoff Bowl berth from the Western Conference by outscoring Minnesota 65–37 in their two meetings.)	8	5	1	.615	6–5–1	342	245	T1
Minnesota Vikings	8	5	1	.615	6–5–1	355	296	W3
Detroit Lions	7	5	2	.583	6–4–2	280	260	W2
Los Angeles Rams	5	7	2	.417	3–7–2	283	339	T1
Chicago Bears	5	9	0	.357	5–7	260	379	L2
San Francisco 49ers	4	10	0	.286	3–9	236	330	L1

Note: Tie games were not officially counted in the standings until 1972.

== Playoff Bowl ==
Round	Date	Opponent	Result	Venue	Attendance
Playoff Bowl	January 3, 1965	St. Louis Cardinals	L 17–24	Orange Bowl	56,218

== Awards and records ==
- Bart Starr, NFL leader, passing yards, (2,144 yards)
