= Darrell Lester =

Darrell Lester may refer to two professional American football players:

- Darrell Lester (center) (1914–1993), center for the Green Bay Packers (1937–1938)
- Darrell Lester (fullback) (1940–2006), fullback for the Minnesota Vikings (1964) and Denver Broncos (1965–1966)
