= 1964 Los Angeles Rams season =

NFL team season

- Owner: Dan Reeves
- Head coach: Harland Svare
- Home stadium: Los Angeles Memorial Coliseum

Results
- Record: 5–7–2
- Division place: 5th NFL Western
- Playoffs: Did not qualify

The 1964 Los Angeles Rams season was the team's 27th year competing as a member of the National Football League (NFL) and the 19th season in Los Angeles. The Rams were attempting to improve on their 5–9 record from the previous season and make the playoffs for the first time since 1955. The season got off to a promising start with wins over Pittsburgh and Minnesota, sandwiched around a tie against the Detroit Lions. However, the Rams lost their next two games on the road to the Bears and Colts to even their record at 2–2–1. The Rams rebounded by winning 3 of their next 4 games to stand at 5–3–1, and their playoff hopes intact. However, the Rams collapsed in their final 5 games, going 0–4–1, with the tie coming against the Green Bay Packers in the final game of the season. The Rams ultimately finished with a 5–7–2 record and missed the postseason for the 9th straight year. This is the first season that the Rams wore blue and white uniforms with white ram horns on a blue helmet. They would switch back to their traditional blue and gold in 1973.

== Schedule ==
Week	Date	Opponent	Result	Record	Venue	Attendance
1	September 13	at Pittsburgh Steelers	**W** 26–14	1–0	Pitt Stadium	33,988
2	September 19	**Detroit Lions**	**T** 17–17	1–0–1	Los Angeles Memorial Coliseum	52,001
3	September 27	**Minnesota Vikings**	**W** 22–13	2–0–1	Los Angeles Memorial Coliseum	50,009
4	October 4	at **Baltimore Colts**	**L** 20–35	2–1–1	Memorial Stadium	56,537
5	October 11	at **Chicago Bears**	**L** 17–38	2–2–1	Wrigley Field	47,358
6	October 18	**San Francisco 49ers**	**W** 42–14	3–2–1	Los Angeles Memorial Coliseum	54,355
7	October 25	at **Green Bay Packers**	**W** 27–17	4–2–1	Milwaukee County Stadium	47,617
8	November 1	at **Detroit Lions**	**L** 17–37	4–3–1	Tiger Stadium	52,064
9	November 8	Philadelphia Eagles	**W** 20–10	5–3–1	Los Angeles Memorial Coliseum	53,994
10	November 15	**Chicago Bears**	**L** 24–34	5–4–1	Los Angeles Memorial Coliseum	61,115
11	November 23	**Baltimore Colts**	**L** 7–24	5–5–1	Los Angeles Memorial Coliseum	72,137
12	November 29	at **Minnesota Vikings**	**L** 13–34	5–6–1	Metropolitan Stadium	31,677
13	December 6	at **San Francisco 49ers**	**L** 7–28	5–7–1	Kezar Stadium	31,791
14	December 13	**Green Bay Packers**	**T** 24–24	5–7–2	Los Angeles Memorial Coliseum	40,735
Note: Intra-conference opponents are in **bold** text.

== Standings ==
NFL Western Conference
	W	L	T	PCT	CONF	PF	PA	STK
Baltimore Colts	12	2	0	.857	10–2	428	225	W1
Green Bay Packers (Note: Green Bay was awarded the Playoff Bowl berth from the Western Conference by outscoring Minnesota 65–37 in their two meetings.)	8	5	1	.615	6–5–1	342	245	T1
Minnesota Vikings	8	5	1	.615	6–5–1	355	296	W3
Detroit Lions	7	5	2	.583	6–4–2	280	260	W2
Los Angeles Rams	5	7	2	.417	3–7–2	283	339	T1
Chicago Bears	5	9	0	.357	5–7	260	379	L2
San Francisco 49ers	4	10	0	.286	3–9	236	330	L1

Note: Tie games were not officially counted in the standings until 1972.

== Roster ==
1964 Los Angeles Rams roster
Quarterbacks (QB): 18 Roman Gabriel; 19 Bill Munson; Running backs (RB): 15 Terry Baker; 22 Dick Bass; 34 Les Josephson; 47 Carver Shannon; 36 Ben Wilson; Wide receivers (WR): 26 Willie Brown; 81 Carroll Dale; 80 Bucky Pope; Tight ends (TE): 25 Duane Allen; 86 Marlin McKeever; 87 Billy Truax	Offensive linemen (OL): 63 Joe Carollo T; 62 Don Chuy G; 73 Charley Cowan G/T; 67 Roger Davis G; 56 Art Hunter C; 71 Joe Scibelli G; 70 Frank Varrichione T; 54 Joe Wendryhoski C; 55 Fred Whittingham G; Defensive linemen (DL): 76 Rosey Grier DT; 75 Deacon Jones DE; 83 Gary Larsen DT/DE; 85 Lamar Lundy DE; 74 Merlin Olsen DT	Linebackers (LB): 60 Marv Harris OLB; 53 Mike Henry MLB; 89 Cliff Livingston OLB; 32 Jack Pardee OLB; 46 Andy Von Sonn LB; Defensive backs (DB): 45 Frank Budka SS/FS; 41 Lindon Crow SS; 42 Aaron Martin CB; 21 Eddie Meador FS; 43 Jerry Richardson CB; 23 Bobby Smith CB/SS; Special teams (ST): 30 Bruce Gossett K; 11 Danny Villanueva P	Reserve: 50 Ken Iman C (IR); -- John Mims T (IR); 82 Jim Phillips WR (IR); Rookies in italics
