= Bill McWatters =

American football player (born 1942)

No. 32, 35, 30
- Position: Fullback

Personal information
- Born: August 1, 1942 (age 84); Donie, Texas, U.S.
- Listed height: 6 ft 0 in (1.83 m)
- Listed weight: 225 lb (102 kg)

Career information
- High school: Teague (Teague, Texas)
- College: North Texas State (1960-1963)
- NFL draft: 1964: 8th round, 103rd overall pick

Career history
- Minnesota Vikings (1964–1965); Florida Brahmans (1965); Richmond Rebels (1966); Richmond Roadrunners (1967–1968)

Career NFL statistics
- Rushing yards: 60
- Rushing average: 4.3
- Touchdowns: 1
- Stats at Pro Football Reference

Billie Pittman McWatters (born August 1, 1942) is an American former professional football player who was a fullback in the National Football League (NFL) and in several minor leagues. He played college football for the North Texas State Eagles.

== Early life ==
McWatters was born and grew up in Donie, Texas and attended Teague High School. He was named All-Central Texas and All-District in football as a senior.

== College career ==
McWatters was a member of the North Texas State Eagles for three seasons. He became a starter as a sophomore and was used primarily as a blocking back. McWatters left the team after his junior year to play professionally.

== Professional career ==
McWatters was selected in the eighth round of the 1964 NFL draft by the Minnesota Vikings. In training camp as a rookie, Tom Franckhauser suffered a near-fatal and career-ending brain injury when he attempted to tackle McWatters during a scrimmage. He played in 11 games with one start as rookie, serving mostly as the backup to Pro Bowl fullback Bill Brown and rushing for 60 yards and one touchdown on 14 carries. He then signed with the Florida Brahmans of the North American Football League. He joined the Richmond Rebels of the Continental Football League in 1966. McWatters was signed by the Richmond Roadrunners of the Atlantic Coast Football League in 1967 and played there for two seasons.
