= 1964 Baltimore Colts season =

12th season in franchise history; first NFL Championship loss

- Owner: Carroll Rosenbloom
- General manager: Don "Red" Kellett
- Head coach: Don Shula
- Home stadium: Memorial Stadium

Results
- Record: 12–2
- Division place: 1st NFL Western
- Playoffs: Lost NFL Championship (at Browns) 0–27

Head coach Don Shula

The 1964 Baltimore Colts season was the 12th season of the second Colts franchise in the National Football League. The Colts finished the regular season with a record of 12 wins and 2 losses, good for first place in the Western Conference. It was their first conference title since 1959.

After an opening loss at Minnesota, the Colts won eleven straight, dropped a home game in December to Detroit, then easily won the finale with Washington.

Baltimore met the Cleveland Browns (10–3–1) of the Eastern Conference in the NFL Championship Game in Cleveland, won by the underdog Browns, 27–0.

== History ==
=== Background ===
The Colts' sideline commander, former defensive back Don Shula, made his head coaching debut in 1963 at age 33, getting off to a rocky start by dropping five of the first eight games of the season. The tide then turned, however, and the Colts finished strong, with five wins and a 1-point loss in the final six contests of the year.

"The last half of 1963 we were as good a team as there was in the NFL," Shula said. "As the season progressed, I learned, the veterans learned, and the rookies learned." Four rookies and one newcomer had started for the blue-and-white and after a rough beginning the team had seemingly jelled. Internally, expectations for the team were high for the Colts entering the 1964 campaign.

The team centered around quarterback Johnny Unitas, a two-time NFL champion who was regarded as one of the most talented passers in the league. The 30-year old Unitas had finished 1962 ranked second among NFL QBs, with his 237 completions and 3,481 yards gained tops in the league. Only 2.9 percent of Unitas' passes ended in interception in 1963 — also best in the league.

The Colts' ground attack had been led by halfback Tom Matte, a third-year player who gained 541 yards in 1963. The Colts' receiving corps featured three of the NFL's top 25 in total receptions, headed by sure-handed split end Raymond Berry, characterized by one pundit as "the slowest, most awkward end in the league, and one of the best." He was joined by a "sawed-off jet" named Jimmy Orr, as well as gritty tight end John Mackey, a future NFL Hall of Famer. This potent trio was ably aided by running back and third wide receiver Lenny Moore; on paper, it was a very solid offensive unit.

The defensive situation was less certain with aging veterans throughout the front seven, including 37-year crowd favorite Gino Marchetti and 32-year old Ordell Braase as bookend defensive ends, with the 36-year old Bill Pellington anchoring the team's linebackers. The defensive backfield was young and fast, however, with cornerback Bob Boyd and safety Jerry Logan regarded as stars.

=== Preseason ===
NFL teams played a five-game preseason schedule in 1964. The Colts posted a record of 3 wins, 1 loss, and 1 tie during the season's warmup phase, topping the Philadelphia Eagles in the opener, battling the Detroit Lions to a 28–28 tie, and dropping game 3 to the St. Louis Cardinals by 9. They finished strong, however, recording blowout victories over the Washington Redskins and Pittsburgh Steelers — with the Colts scoring more than 40 points in each of those one-sided contests.

=== Schedule ===
Week	Date	Opponent	Result	Record	Venue	Attendance
1	September 13	at **Minnesota Vikings**	**L** 24–34	0–1	Metropolitan Stadium	35,563
2	September 20	at **Green Bay Packers**	**W** 21–20	1–1	New City Stadium	42,327
3	September 27	**Chicago Bears**	**W** 52–0	2–1	Memorial Stadium	56,537
4	October 4	**Los Angeles Rams**	**W** 35–20	3–1	Memorial Stadium	56,537
5	October 12	St. Louis Cardinals	**W** 47–27	4–1	Memorial Stadium ^	60,213
6	October 18	**Green Bay Packers**	**W** 24–21	5–1	Memorial Stadium	60,213
7	October 25	at **Detroit Lions**	**W** 34–0	6–1	Tiger Stadium	57,814
8	November 1	**San Francisco 49ers**	**W** 37–7	7–1	Memorial Stadium	60,213
9	November 8	at **Chicago Bears**	**W** 40–24	8–1	Wrigley Field	47,891
10	November 15	**Minnesota Vikings**	**W** 17–14	9–1	Memorial Stadium	60,213
11	November 22	at **Los Angeles Rams**	**W** 24–7	10–1	Los Angeles Memorial Coliseum	72,137
12	November 29	at **San Francisco 49ers**	**W** 14–3	11–1	Kezar Stadium	33,642
13	December 6	**Detroit Lions**	**L** 14–31	11–2	Memorial Stadium	60,213
14	December 13	Washington Redskins	**W** 45–17	12–2	Memorial Stadium	60,213
Note: Intra-conference opponents are in **bold** text.

Note: The Week 5 game with the Cardinals was scheduled to be played at St. Louis, but moved to Baltimore
when the baseball Cardinals reached the World Series, preempting use of Busch Stadium.

== Season summary ==
The Colts won their 1964 home opener with a 52–0 thrashing of the Chicago Bears.

Head Coach Don Shula won both 1964 duels against divisional rival Vince Lombardi and the Green Bay Packers.

=== Week 2 at Packers ===
Baltimore Colts (0–1) at Green Bay Packers (1–0)

Quarter	1	2	3	4	Total
Colts	7	14	0	0	21
Packers	7	6	7	0	20

at New City Stadium, Green Bay, Wisconsin

- Date: September 20
- Game weather: 65 °F (18 °C)
- Game attendance: 42,327
- Box Score

Game information

First quarter

- BAL – Lenny Moore 52-yard pass from Johnny Unitas (Lou Michaels kick). Colts 7–0. Drive:
- GB – Paul Hornung 20-yard run (Paul Hornung kick). Tie 7–7. Drive:

Second quarter

- BAL – Lenny Moore 4-yard run (Lou Michaels kick). Colts 14–7. Drive:
- GB – Paul Hornung 4-yard run (kick failed). Colts 14–13. Drive:
- BAL – John Mackey 40-yard pass from Johnny Unitas (Lou Michaels kick). Colts 21–13. Drive:

Third quarter

- GB – Jim Taylor 23-yard run (Paul Hornung kick). Colts 21–20. Drive:

Fourth quarter

- No scoring

Top passers

- BAL – Johnny Unitas – 7/12, 154 yards, 2 TD
- GB – Bart Starr – 16/21, 175 yards, 3 INT

Top rushers

- BAL – Jerry Hill – 15 rushes, 49 yards
- GB – Jim Taylor – 18 rushes, 98 yards, TD

Top receivers

- BAL – Lenny Moore – 1 reception, 52 yards, TD
- GB – Boyd Dowler – 7 receptions, 66 yards

The Colts picked up their second loss of the 1964 season in Week 13 against the Detroit Lions.

The 1964 home finale against the Washington Redskins was proclaimed "Gino Marchetti–Bill Pellington Day" in honor of two retiring Colts veterans.

== Standings ==
NFL Western Conference
	W	L	T	PCT	CONF	PF	PA	STK
Baltimore Colts	12	2	0	.857	10–2	428	225	W1
Green Bay Packers (Note: Green Bay was awarded the Playoff Bowl berth from the Western Conference by outscoring Minnesota 65–37 in their two meetings.)	8	5	1	.615	6–5–1	342	245	T1
Minnesota Vikings	8	5	1	.615	6–5–1	355	296	W3
Detroit Lions	7	5	2	.583	6–4–2	280	260	W2
Los Angeles Rams	5	7	2	.417	3–7–2	283	339	T1
Chicago Bears	5	9	0	.357	5–7	260	379	L2
San Francisco 49ers	4	10	0	.286	3–9	236	330	L1

Note: Tie games were not officially counted in the standings until 1972.

== Postseason ==
After Baltimore's 12–2 regular season, they traveled to Cleveland to take on the Browns (10–3–1) for the NFL title on December 27. The host team was alternated between the conferences, Eastern in even-numbered seasons and Western in the odd-numbered. This was the third championship game appearance for the Colts since joining the NFL in 1953, and they entered the game as a seven-point favorite. Both teams had two weeks to prepare: the first half was uneventful and scoreless, but the home underdog Browns scored seventeen points in the third quarter in their 27–0 rout of the Colts.

Round	Date	Opponent	Result	Record	Venue	Attendance
Championship	December 27	at Cleveland Browns	L 0–27	0–1	Cleveland Municipal Stadium	79,544

=== 1964 NFL Championship Game: at Cleveland Browns ===
1964 NFL Championship Game: Cleveland Browns 27, Baltimore Colts 0

Quarter	1	2	3	4	Total
Colts	0	0	0	0	0
Browns	0	0	17	10	27

at Cleveland Municipal Stadium, Cleveland, Ohio

- Date: December 27
- Game time: 1:30 p.m. EST
- Game weather: 34 °F (1 °C), relative humidity 75%, wind 15 mph (24 km/h), wind chill 23 °F (−5 °C)
- Game attendance: 79,554
- Referee: Norm Schachter
- TV announcers (CBS): Chuck Thompson (BAL) (second half) and Ken Coleman (CLE) (first half) (play-by-play), Frank Gifford (color commentator)
- Pro-Football-Reference.com

Game information

Third Quarter

- CLE - Lou Groza 43 yard field goal - Browns 3-0
- CLE - Gary Collins 18 yard pass from Frank Ryan - (Lou Groza kick) Browns 10-0
- CLE - Gary Collins 42 yard pass from Frank Ryan - (Lou Groza kick) Browns 17-0

Fourth Quarter

- CLE - Lou Groza 10 yard field goal - Browns 20-0
- CLE - Gary Collins 51 yard pass from Frank Ryan - (Lou Groza kick) Browns 27-0

Colts

Browns

== Awards and honors ==
- Johnny Unitas, Bert Bell Award

== Personnel ==
=== Staff/coaches ===
1964 Baltimore Colts staff
Front office: Owner/president and treasurer – Carroll Rosenbloom; General manager – Red Kellett; Coaching staff: Head coach – Don Shula; Offensive coaches: Receivers/offensive ends – Dick Bielski; Offensive backs – Don McCafferty; Offensive line coach - John Sandusky	Defensive coaches: Defensive coordinator - Charley Winner; Defensive line - Bill Arnsparger; Defensive backfield – Chuck Noll; Linebackers coach – Don Shula

=== Roster ===
1964 Baltimore Colts roster
Quarterbacks (QB): 15 Gary Cuozzo; 19 Johnny Unitas; Running backs (RB): 24 Lenny Moore; 32 Joe Don Looney P; 33 Tony Lorick; 41 Tom Matte; 45 Jerry Hill; Wide receivers (WR): 25 Alex Hawkins; 28 Jimmy Orr; 82 Raymond Berry; 84 Neal Petties; 87 Willie Richardson; Tight ends (TE): 88 John Mackey; 86 Butch Wilson	Offensive linemen (OL): 52 Dick Szymanski C; 60 George Preas T; 61 Lou Kirouac G/T; 66 Alex Sandusky G; 71 Dan Sullivan G; 72 Bob Vogel T; 73 Tom Gilburg C/P; 77 Jim Parker G; Defensive linemen (DL): 74 Billy Ray Smith DT; 75 Guy Reese DT; 76 Fred Miller DT; 78 John Diehl DT; 81 Ordell Braase DE; 89 Gino Marchetti DE	Linebackers (LB): 31 Steve Stonebreaker OLB; 35 Ted Davis OLB/MLB; 36 Bill Pellington MLB; 55 Jackie Burkett OLB; 66 Don Shinnick OLB; Defensive backs (DB): 20 Jerry Logan SS; 26 Wendell Harris FS; 30 Alvin Haymond CB; 40 Bobby Boyd CB; 43 Lenny Lyles CB; 46 Jim Welch FS; Special teams (ST): 79 Lou Michaels K/DE	Reserve: 53 Butch Maples LB (IR); Rookies in italics

== See also ==
- 1964 NFL season
- History of the Indianapolis Colts
