= Bill Pellington =

American football player (1927–1994)

- Pellington in 1960

No. 65, 36
- Position: Linebacker

Personal information
- Born: September 25, 1927; Paterson, New Jersey, U.S.
- Died: April 26, 1994 (aged 66); Towson, Maryland, U.S.
- Listed height: 6 ft 2 in (1.88 m)
- Listed weight: 234 lb (106 kg)

Career information
- High school: Ramsey (NJ)
- College: Defiance (1948-1950); Rutgers (1950-1952)
- NFL draft: 1952: undrafted

Career history

Playing
- Cleveland Browns (1952)*; Baltimore Colts (1953–1964)
- * Offseason or practice squad member only

Coaching
- Baltimore Colts (1963) Defensive backs coach

Awards and highlights
- 2× NFL champion (1958, 1959); Second-team All-Pro (1964); Rutgers Athletics Hall of Fame (1988)

Career NFL statistics
- Interceptions: 21
- Fumble recoveries: 14
- Total touchdowns: 1
- Stats at Pro Football Reference

William A. Pellington (September 25, 1927 – April 26, 1994) was an American professional football linebacker who played 12 seasons in the National Football League (NFL) for the Baltimore Colts. Known for his aggressive style and so-called neck-tie tackles, Pellington was a mainstay with the Colts teams that captured league championships in the 1958 and 1959 seasons.

== Early life ==
Bill Pellington was born on September 25, 1927, in Paterson, New Jersey. He was raised in nearby Ramsey, New Jersey, where he attended and played prep football at Ramsey High School.

After graduating from high school, Pellington joined the U.S. Navy, and was stationed in Panama during the final months of World War II. Upon returning to New Jersey after his military service, Pellington played football and baseball for the team representing the American Legion in Wyckoff, New Jersey.

== College career ==
Pellington began his college football career at Defiance College in Defiance, Ohio before transferring to Rutgers University. Pellington spent two years at Rutgers, graduating in 1952. While at Rutgers, Pellington became known for his speed relative to his size and played both quarterback and fullback. Under coach Harvey Harman, Rutgers went 4–4 in both of Pellington's seasons.

Pellington was inducted into the inaugural class of the Rutgers Athletics Hall of Fame in 1988.

== Professional career ==
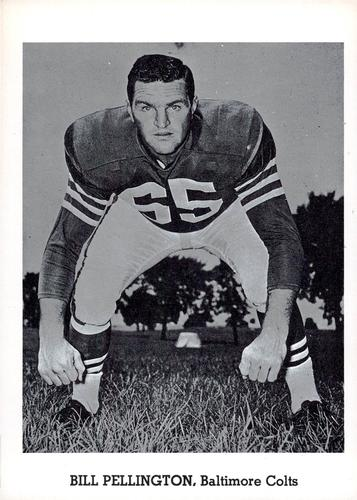
Pellington in 1960.

After graduating from Rutgers, Pellington was signed as an undrafted free agent with the Cleveland Browns for the 1952 NFL season.

After being cut from the Browns, Pellington returned to New Jersey. In April 1953, Pellington was offered a tryout by the newly constituted Baltimore Colts. He hitchhiked 236 miles (380 km) from his home in Ramsey, New Jersey, to Baltimore, ultimately making the team. In his first season with the Colts, Pellington appeared in all 12 games, starting in 11, and recorded two interceptions and two fumble recoveries on the season.

Between 1953 and 1956, Pellington appeared in all 48 games, starting all but one, and quickly earned a reputation as a hard-hitting defensive playmaker. Pellington captained the 1956 Colts defense.

Pellington suffered a broken arm in the opening game of the 1957 season against the Detroit Lions. He was sidelined for the remainder of the season.

Pellington returned for the 1958 season and recorded four interceptions as part of the Colts 1958 NFL Championship winning team. In the deciding overtime period, Pellington stopped New York Giants quarterback Charley Conerly on a scramble, which gave Baltimore the ball and led to Alan Ameche's game-winning touchdown.

In 1959, Pellington again recorded four interceptions and the Colts repeated as NFL champions.

During the 1963 season, new Colts head coach Don Shula named Pellington the Colts' defensive backs coach. Pellington's longtime teammate, Gino Marchetti, was named defensive line coaches. Both remained as players on the field, making them the first player-coaches in team history. Pellington and Marchetti were relieved of their coaching duties prior to the 1964 season.

In 1964, Pellington's final season, he recorded two interceptions and one fumble recovery. The Colts earned a place in the 1964 NFL Championship Game against the Cleveland Browns. The Colts lost 27–0, and Pellington retired following the conclusion of the season.

== Legacy ==
In his book Days In The Sun, longtime Baltimore Sun sportswriter John Steadman described Pellington: "If a sculptor wanted to mold the face and physique of a football player, the perfect working model was Bill Pellington, who spent 12 impact years with the Baltimore Colts and distinguished himself with an intensity that earned respect..."

Pellington was known for his swing-arm tackling technique, or neck-tie tackling. Colts teammate Alex Hawkins later recalled, "Bill Pellington should have been thrown out of every game he ever played and most of the practices. Pellington was nuts. Even the officials were a little afraid of him. He got away with murder."

== Personal life ==
Pellington was married to Milica "Micki" Pellington, the couple had two children. They resided in Timonium, Maryland and remained after Pellington retired from the NFL.

In 1963, Pellington opened The Iron Horse restaurant in Timonium. Pellington and several other former Colts players opened businesses in the Baltimore area, which was encouraged and sometimes funded by then-Baltimore Colts owner Carroll Rosenbloom. In December 1976, a disgruntled patron of The Iron Horse attempted to firebomb the restaurant by dropping flaming toilet paper rolls from a plane. The toilet paper did not light, and the man was charged with littering and reckless flying. Less than two weeks later, the same man would crash a small airplane into the upper deck of Baltimore's Memorial Stadium after the end of a playoff game between the Colts and the Pittsburgh Steelers. No fans were injured in that crash.

Pellington's youngest son is film and music video director Mark Pellington. Mark created a documentary film, Father's Daze, which examined his father's battle with Alzheimer's disease. His older son, William "Bato" Pellington, is an industrial real-estate broker in Baltimore.

Pellington died on April 26, 1994, of respiratory complications from Alzheimer's disease.
