= Alex Sandusky =

American football player (1932–2020)

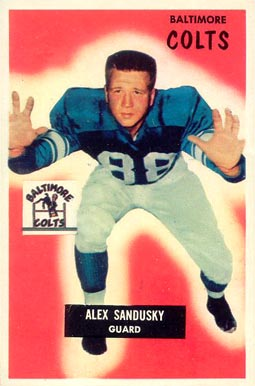
- Sandusky on a 1955 Bowman football card

No. 68
- Positions: Center, guard

Personal information
- Born: August 17, 1932; McKees Rocks, Pennsylvania, U.S.
- Died: August 11, 2020 (aged 87); Louisville, Kentucky, U.S.
- Listed height: 6 ft 1 in (1.85 m)
- Listed weight: 235 lb (107 kg)

Career information
- High school: Sto-Rox (McKees Rocks)
- College: Clarion (PA)
- NFL draft: 1954: 16th round, 184th overall pick

Career history
- Baltimore Colts (1954–1966)

Awards and highlights
- 2× NFL champion (1958, 1959); Second-team All-Pro (1964)

Career NFL statistics
- Games played: 166
- Games started: 165
- Fumble recoveries: 3
- Stats at Pro Football Reference

Alexander Vincent Sandusky (August 17, 1932 – August 11, 2020) was an American professional football guard who played for 13 seasons with the Baltimore Colts of the National Football League (NFL). Sandusky attended Clarion State College (now known as PennWest Clarion).
