= Tony Lorick =

American football player (1941–2013)

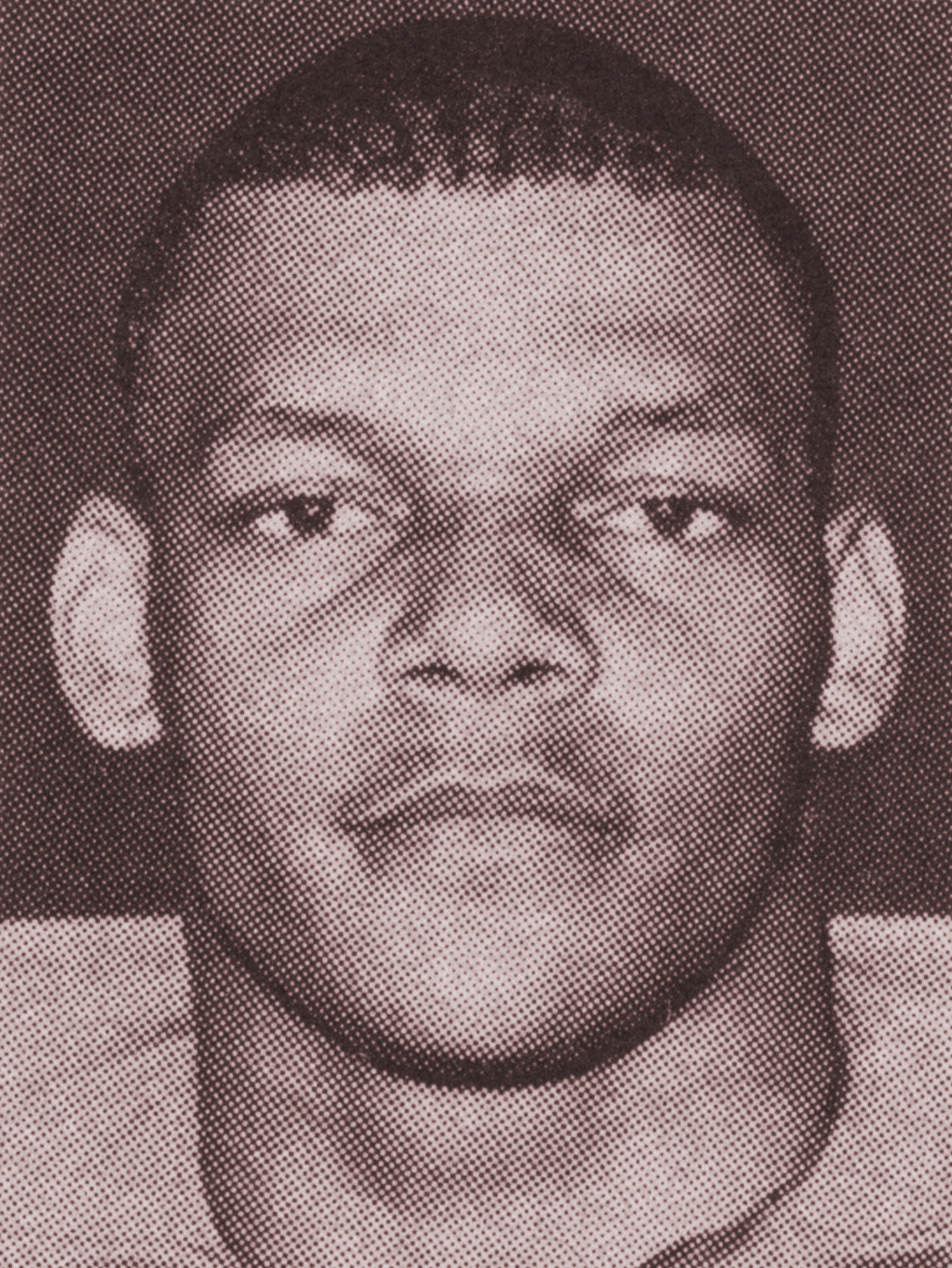

No. 33, 34
- Position: Running back

Personal information
- Born: May 25, 1941; Los Angeles, California, U.S.
- Died: February 17, 2013 (aged 71); Kerrville, Texas, U.S.
- Listed height: 6 ft 1 in (1.85 m)
- Listed weight: 217 lb (98 kg)

Career information
- High school: John C. Fremont (Los Angeles)
- College: Arizona State (1961-1963)
- NFL draft: 1964: 2nd round, 22nd overall pick
- AFL draft: 1964: 1st round, 7th overall pick

Career history
- Baltimore Colts (1964–1967); New Orleans Saints (1968–1969)

Awards and highlights
- WAC Offensive Player of the Year (1963)

Career NFL statistics
- Rushing yards: 2,124
- Rushing average: 3.9
- Receptions: 86
- Receiving yards: 890
- Total touchdowns: 19
- Stats at Pro Football Reference

William Anthony Lorick (May 25, 1941 – February 17, 2013) was an American football running back who played for six seasons in the National Football League (NFL).

A Los Angeles prep phenom at halfback, Lorick was converted to fullback by head coach Frank Kush during his college years at Arizona State University. He played four years as a tough blocker and effective runner for the Baltimore Colts before being traded to the New Orleans Saints for the second round draft pick that would be converted into Pro-Bowl linebacker Ted Hendricks.

Lorick would be plagued by injuries during his final two seasons in the NFL and would finish with 2,124 yards rushing with a 3.9 yards per carry average, and 3,014 total yards with a total of 19 touchdowns.

== Biography ==
=== Early life ===
Tony Lorick was born May 25, 1941, in Los Angeles, California.

Lorick attended John C. Fremont High School in Los Angeles, where he was a star running back, gaining 3,600 yards and racking up 230 points scored over three varsity football seasons.

=== Collegiate career ===
After graduation from high school, Lorick spent one year at Eastern Los Angeles Junior College, gaining 1,043 yards rushing.

In the 2014 oral history volume, The Game Before the Money, Lorick recalled that neither of the two collegiate football powers in Los Angeles held any attraction for him — neither UCLA, which "played a slow brand of football," nor USC, for which "all the guys from my area were sitting on the bench." Blessed with a large number of alternative scholarship offers, Lorick initially decided upon the University of Washington in Seattle, — only to be rained upon every day during a two week visit.

"I called Arizona State and asked, 'Does that scholarship offer still stand?' They said, 'Yeah,' and tried to offer me some other little funds, which, by the way, I'm still waiting for," Lorick recalled with a laugh.

At Arizona State Lorick gained a national reputation as a hard-running halfback. He gained 704 yards with a 6.7 yards per carry average as a junior in 1962, operating from the halfback position. Lorick was moved to fullback by head coach Frank Kush for his 1963 senior year and performed even better, accumulating 805 yards on the ground with a 7.7 yards per carry average. Standing 6'1" with a 215 pound frame and sound blocking skills, Lorick was regarded as one of the top running backs of the 1963 crop of collegians.

=== Professional career ===
==== Baltimore Colts ====
Lorick was selected in the first round of the 1964 AFL draft by the Oakland Raiders and in the second round of the 1964 NFL draft by the Baltimore Colts, the 22nd selection overall. Lorick later asserted that he would have been the first round selection of the Colts, but Raiders owner Al Davis "circulated a rumor that I'd already signed with him. The Colts came back to see if I was available in the second round after I proved to them there wasn't a contract out there."

The Colts were enthusiastic about their new acquisition, characterizing him as "a punishing runner, both to the inside and around the flank" but also "an exceptional blocker."

Tony Lorick in an Arizona State University publicity photo, 1963.

Lorick saw action in all 14 games for the Colts in his rookie 1964 season, starting in 7. He carried the ball 100 times on the season for 513 yards, an impressive average of 5.1 yards per carry, scoring 4 touchdowns. Lorick also saw extensive duty as the Colts' kickoff returner, bringing back 13 balls with an average of 29.6 yards per return and what would prove to be his career long runback of 71 yards.

The Colts finished the 1964 season with an impressive record of 12 wins and 2 losses, winning their first Western Division title since 1959 and earning a berth to the 1964 NFL Championship Game. Lorick saw limited action in the championship game, catching three passes out of the backfield for 18 yards gained.

The injury bug bit in 1965, Lorick's second professional year, as he was hobbled by a badly bruised thigh. The injury which limited him to 63 carries for 296 yards (4.7 yards per carry average).

Lorick was a fullback with a reputation that preceded him, regarded as a hard blocker who took "particular delight in belting the bejabbers out of whoever happens to be across the line of scrimmage from him." His production as a rusher went into decline, however, though he gained 524 yards in 1966 and 424 yards in 1967, his yards per attempt numbers had fallen to 3.7 and 3.3 yards, respectively.

Lorick entered the 1968 campaign in the Colts' training camp, but once again a nagging leg injury — a pulled muscle this time — sapped his effectiveness. A newcomer, rookie Terry Cole, looked capable. Colts general manager Harry Hulmes sought a new home for Tony Lorick, and found a trading partner in the New Orleans Saints, who agreed to send a second round draft pick Baltimore's way in exchange for the veteran fullback.

Head coach Don Shula expressed regret at the loss of Lorick. "He was a good man for us and one of the better blocking fullbacks in pro ranks," he said.

The pick traded by the Saints for Lorick, number 33 overall in the 1969 NFL/AFL draft, would be converted into Pro-Bowl linebacker Ted Hendricks.

During his four years with the Colts, Lorick played in all 56 regular season games. He carried the ball 439 times for 1,769 yards (4.0 yards per carry average) and scored 14 rushing touchdowns. He also grabbed 60 passes for Baltimore for 618 yards and 2 more scores.

During the off-season, Lorick worked as a salesman for the National Brewing Company of Baltimore — one of the chief corporate sponsors of the Colts.

==== New Orleans Saints ====
Lorick would play two seasons for the Saints, one of the perennial doormats of the NFL during this era. He would start 8 games for New Orleans in the 1968 season, gaining 343 yards on the ground (3.3 yards per carry average) and 272 in the air, for a total of 625 yards and 3 touchdowns. These would be Lorick's last times into the end zone.

The 1969 season, Lorick's last, would be unproductive. Although he played in all 14 games for the Saints, his use was extremely limited and he only carried the ball 5 times for 11 yards, catching no passes.

=== Death and legacy ===
After his retirement from the NFL, Lorick made his home in Kerrville, Texas. His son, Anthony Maurice Lorick, grew to 6'6" and 275 pounds and was an All-District high school offensive lineman, going on to play at Howard University in Washington, D.C at the end of the 1990s.

Tony Lorick died on February 17, 2013, at Kerrville. He was 71 years old at the time of his death.

== NFL career statistics ==
Legend
**Bold**	Career high

=== Regular season ===
Year	Team	Games		Rushing					Receiving				
Year	Team	GP	GS	Att	Yds	Avg	Lng	TD	Rec	Yds	Avg	Lng	TD
1964	BAL	14	7	100	513	**5.1**	**60**	4	11	164	**14.9**	**59**	0
1965	BAL	14	0	63	296	4.7	38	1	15	184	12.3	49	2
1966	BAL	14	11	**143**	**524**	3.7	41	3	12	81	6.8	19	0
1967	BAL	14	9	133	436	3.3	22	**6**	22	189	8.6	34	0
1968	NOR	13	8	104	344	3.3	36	0	**26**	**272**	10.5	29	**3**
1969	NOR	14	0	5	11	2.2	6	0	0	0	0.0	0	0
		83	35	548	2,124	3.9	60	14	86	890	10.3	59	5

=== Playoffs ===
Year	Team	Games		Rushing					Receiving				
Year	Team	GP	GS	Att	Yds	Avg	Lng	TD	Rec	Yds	Avg	Lng	TD
1964	BAL	1	0	0	0	0.0	0	0	**3**	**18**	**6.0**	**8**	0
1965	BAL	1	0	**1**	**1**	**1.0**	**1**	0	0	0	0.0	0	0
		2	0	1	1	1.0	1	0	3	18	6.0	8	0
