= Bob Poole (American football) =

American football player (1941–2017)

- Poole, circa 1966

No. 82, 88
- Position: Tight end

Personal information
- Born: October 5, 1941; Paducah, Kentucky, U.S.
- Died: December 26, 2017 (aged 76); League City, Texas, U.S.
- Listed height: 6 ft 4 in (1.93 m)
- Listed weight: 225 lb (102 kg)

Career information
- High school: Coffee (Florence, Alabama)
- College: Clemson (1960–1963)
- NFL draft: 1964: 8th round, 102nd overall pick

Career history
- San Francisco 49ers (1964–1965); Houston Oilers (1966–1967); Cincinnati Bengals (1968)*
- * Offseason or practice squad member only
- Stats at Pro Football Reference

Robert Edward Poole (October 5, 1941 – December 26, 2017) was an American professional football tight end who played for the San Francisco 49ers of the National Football League (NFL) and the Houston Oilers of the American Football League (AFL). He played college football for the Clemson Tigers and was selected by the 49ers in the eighth round of the 1964 NFL draft.

== Early life ==
Robert Edward Poole was born on October 5, 1941, in Paducah, Kentucky. He attended Decatur High School in Decatur, Mississippi, and Coffee High School in Florence, Alabama.

== College career ==
Poole enrolled at Clemson University to play college football for the Tigers. He was on the freshman team in 1960 and a three-year letterman from 1961 to 1963. He played in all 30 games for the Tigers from 1961 to 1963, catching 18 passes for 305 yards.

== Professional career ==
Poole was selected by the 49ers in the eighth round, with the 102nd overall pick, of the 1964 NFL draft. He signed with the team on January 15, 1964. He appeared in 22 games for the 49ers from 1964 to 1965 in a reserve role, recording three receptions for 37 yards. Poole suffered a knee injury during the 1965 season. He was released on August 1, 1966.

Poole signed with the Houston Oilers of the American Football League (AFL) on August 24, 1966. He played in all 28 games, starting 17, for the Oilers from 1966 to 1967, catching 16 passes for 186 yards.

On January 17, 1968, Poole was selected by the Cincinnati Bengals in the 1968 AFL expansion draft. He signed with the Bengals on June 5, 1968. In early August 1968, the Bengals returned Poole to the Oilers due to an unreported achilles tendon injury. On September 16, 1968, it was reported that Poole had been placed on the voluntarily retired list.
