= Tom Franckhauser =

American football player (1937–1997)

No. 81, 32, 40
- Position: Cornerback

Personal information
- Born: May 26, 1937; Steubenville, Ohio, U.S.
- Died: April 17, 1997 (aged 59); Houston, Texas, U.S.
- Listed height: 6 ft 0 in (1.83 m)
- Listed weight: 195 lb (88 kg)

Career information
- High school: Catholic Central (OH).
- College: Purdue
- NFL draft: 1959: 3rd round, 33rd overall pick

Career history
- Los Angeles Rams (1959); Dallas Cowboys (1960–1961); Minnesota Vikings (1962–1964)

Awards and highlights
- Second-team All-Big Ten (1958)

Career NFL statistics
- Interceptions: 13
- Fumble recoveries: 5
- Stats at Pro Football Reference

Thomas Anthony Franckhauser (May 26, 1937 – April 17, 1997) was an American professional football cornerback who played in the National Football League (NFL) for the Los Angeles Rams, the Dallas Cowboys, and the Minnesota Vikings. He played college football at Purdue University.

== Early life ==
Known as "Knute", Franckhauser was born in Steubenville, Ohio, and played high school football there at Catholic Central High School.

He accepted a scholarship from Purdue University, where he became a three-year starter at offensive end. In 1957, he helped his team upset Michigan State University, which was ranked number one in the nation at the time. As a senior, he was named the team's MVP.

== Professional career ==
=== Los Angeles Rams ===
Franckhauser was selected by the Los Angeles Rams in the third round (33rd overall) of the 1959 NFL draft. As a rookie, he was moved to cornerback, before finishing the season as a starter at safety. He tied for the team lead with 3 interceptions.

=== Dallas Cowboys ===
He was selected by the Dallas Cowboys in the 1960 NFL expansion draft. He became the first player in Dallas Cowboys history to carry the football during a regular season game as he returned the opening kickoff in their inaugural regular season game. He also became the first starter at left cornerback in franchise history. He registered 45 tackles, 13 passes defensed, 3 interceptions (tied for the team lead), 25 kickoff returns for an average of 19.8 yards and 3 punt returns.

In 1961, he was passed on the depth chart by Warren Livingston. He was activated on November 7 and played in only 6 games (4 starts), after Livingston was placed on the injured reserve list. On December 31, he was traded to the Cleveland Browns in exchange for punter Sam Baker.

=== Cleveland Browns ===
In September 1962, he was traded along with offensive tackle Errol Linden, offensive end Charley Ferguson and placekicker Fred Cox, to the Minnesota Vikings in exchange for a sixth round selection (#72-Ernie Borghetti).

=== Minnesota Vikings ===
In 1962, he was one of the key players in the Minnesota Vikings defense, finishing the year with 4 interceptions (tied for third on the team). In 1964, he suffered a near fatal brain injury while tackling rookie Bill McWatters in a training camp scrimmage. He would be lost for the season and forced into early retirement.

== Personal life ==
On April 17, 1997, Franckhauser died of a heart attack.

Franckhauser's first cousin was Danny Abramowicz, who played college football at Xavier University and professionally as an original New Orleans Saint. His twin grandsons, Walker Hume and Tucker Hume, were both professional soccer players with FC Dallas and Ottawa Fury FC respectively.
