= Mick Tingelhoff =

American football player (1940–2021)

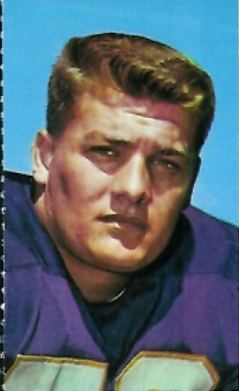
- Tingelhoff in 1969

No. 53
- Position: Center

Personal information
- Born: May 22, 1940; Lexington, Nebraska, U.S.
- Died: September 11, 2021 (aged 81); Lakeville, Minnesota, U.S.
- Listed height: 6 ft 2 in (1.88 m)
- Listed weight: 237 lb (108 kg)

Career information
- High school: Lexington
- College: Nebraska (1958–1961)
- NFL draft: 1962: undrafted

Career history
- Minnesota Vikings (1962–1978)

Awards and highlights
- NFL champion (1969); 5× First-team All-Pro (1964–1966, 1968, 1969); Second-team All-Pro (1967); 6× Pro Bowl (1964–1969); 50 Greatest Vikings; Minnesota Vikings 25th Anniversary Team; Minnesota Vikings 40th Anniversary Team; Minnesota Vikings Ring of Honor; Minnesota Vikings No. 53 retired; NFL record: Most consecutive starts by an offensive lineman: 240 (Note: 259 including playoffs)

Career NFL statistics
- Games played: 240
- Games started: 240
- Fumble recoveries: 13
- Stats at Pro Football Reference
- Pro Football Hall of Fame

Henry Michael Tingelhoff (May 22, 1940 – September 11, 2021) was an American professional football player who was a center for the Minnesota Vikings of the National Football League (NFL) from 1962 to 1978. He was elected to the Pro Football Hall of Fame in 2015.

== Early life ==
Tingelhoff was born on May 22, 1940, in Lexington, Nebraska, where he grew up on his family's farm. He was the sixth and youngest child of German immigrants Henry and Clara (Ortmeier) Tingelhoff. The family did not get electricity until he was a senior in high school. He attended Lexington High School, playing center and linebacker for the football team. His parents did not think much of football and preferred that he stay on the farm rather than attend college.

== College career ==
Tingelhoff attended the University of Nebraska–Lincoln on a scholarship, where he played center and linebacker. He earned three letters during his football career there, but did not become a starter until his senior season in 1961. He was a co-captain of that 1961 team, earning All-Conference and All-State honors, on a team which had its biggest offensive output in over five seasons. Tingelhoff participated in the Senior Bowl in Mobile, Alabama, and in the All-American Bowl after the regular season was over.

== Professional career ==
After graduating from Nebraska, Tingelhoff entered the 1962 NFL draft but was not drafted and instead signed with the Minnesota Vikings as a free agent in 1962. He became their starting center during his rookie season and held that spot until he retired in 1978. He never missed a game, starting 240 regular season games and 19 playoff games.

The Vikings won 10 division titles from 1968 to 1978 with Tingelhoff at center. Those Viking teams won four of the five NFL/NFC championships in which they participated, and played in Super Bowls IV, VIII, IX, and XI, losing all four games.

Beginning in 1964, he was named first-team All-NFL seven consecutive seasons. He was also elected to the Pro Bowl six consecutive years from 1965 to 1970. He was named first-team All-Pro five times in the 1960s. In 1969, he was named to the 1,000-yard Club as the NFL's top blocker.

Tingelhoff was selected All-Pro by the Associated Press (AP) from 1964 to 1966 and 1968–1969; United Press International (UPI) from 1964 to 1969; the Newspaper Enterprise Association (NEA) from 1965 to 1966, and 1968–1969; and was selected ALL-NFC by the AP in 1970. In 1967, he was named first-team All-Pro by the NEA and UPI and second-team All-Pro by the AP. In 1970, he was named first-team All-Pro by both the PFWA and Pro Football Weekly. He was also named second-team All-Pro by the NEA.

Tingelhoff was one of 11 players to have played in all four Vikings Super Bowl appearances in the 1970s, and is generally considered to have been the premier center of his era. At the time of his retirement he had started in the 2nd most consecutive games (240 games) in NFL history behind teammate Jim Marshall (270), and was tied for third as of 2020. He was inducted into the Vikings Ring of Honor in 2001, and has had his No. 53 retired by the franchise.

== Legacy and honors ==
Tingelhoff was elected to the Pro Football Hall of Fame in 2015. He is also a member of the Nebraska Football Hall of Fame (class of 1980).

In 2011, Tingelhoff was named as that year's recipient of the Gerald R. Ford Legends Award. The award was presented to him during the 12th Annual Rimington Trophy Presentation banquet on January 14, 2012, at the Rococo Theatre in Lincoln, Nebraska.

In 2003, he was named to the Professional Football Researchers Association Hall of Very Good in the association's inaugural HOVG class.

The hall of fame linebacker Dick Butkus (and member of the NFL's 100th Anniversary Team), said Tingelhoff was the “'toughest center I ever played against.'”

== Death ==
He died on September 11, 2021, from complications of Parkinson's disease and dementia. Tingelhoff had been among the first group of former players filing a concussion lawsuit against the NFL, alleging they were misled about the long-term effects of head injuries, which settled in 2013.
