= 1964 San Francisco 49ers season =

American football team season

- Owner: Victor Morabito
- General manager: Louis Spadia
- Head coach: Jack Christiansen
- Home stadium: Kezar Stadium

Results
- Record: 4–10
- Division place: 7th NFL Western
- Playoffs: Did not qualify

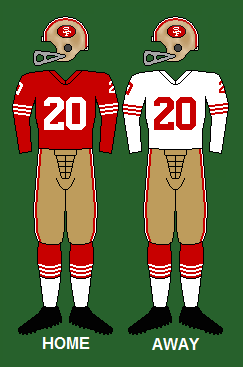
The uniform of the San Francisco 49ers from 1964-1969

The 1964 San Francisco 49ers season was the franchise's 15th season in the National Football League, their 19th overall, and the second under head coach Jack Christiansen. They improved on their 2–12 record from 1963, with a 4-10 record. However, the team failed to qualify for the playoffs for the 7th consecutive season.

After the 1963 season, the 49ers switched their secondary color from silver to gold. They had used gold in the 1947, 1957 and 1958 seasons, but they switched, as it turned out, permanently to red and gold in this season.

== Offseason ==
=== NFL draft ===
The 49ers held the first pick in the draft and selected Dave Parks from Texas Tech. With their third pick, they selected linebacker Dave Wilcox, who would be inducted into the Pro Football Hall of Fame in 2000.

1964 San Francisco 49ers draft
Round	Selection	Player	Position	College	Note
1	1	Dave Parks	WR	Texas Tech	
2	15	George Mira	QB	Miami (FL)	
3	29	Dave Wilcox	LB	Oregon	
4	43	Jim Wilson	G	Georgia	
5	57	Rudy Johnson	Back	Nebraska	
6	71	Gary Lewis	Back	Arizona State	
7	85	Hagood Clarke	Back	Florida	
8	99	Bob Daugherty	Back	Tulsa	
8	102	Bob Poole	End	Clemson	
9	113	Howard Mudd	G	Hillsdale	
10	127	Fred Polser	T	East Texas State	
11	141	Dennis Almquist	G	Idaho	
12	155	Jim Long	Back	Fresno State	
13	169	Bob Brown	T	Arkansas A&M	
14	183	Ed Beard	T	Tennessee	
15	197	Jim Griffin	End	Grambling	
16	211	Cornell Gordon	Back	North Carolina A&T	
17	225	Ken Brusven	T	Oregon State	
18	239	Jerry Cole	End	Southwest Texas State	
19	253	Larry Rawson	Back	Auburn	
20	267	Gene Baker	G	Whitworth	

== Preseason ==
Week	Date	Opponent	Result	Record	Venue
1	August 9	Cleveland Browns	W 26–7	1–0	Kezar Stadium
2	August 15	vs. Dallas Cowboys	L 23–34	1–1	Multnomah Stadium
3	August 22	vs. Minnesota Vikings	L 21–24	1–2	Ute Stadium
4	August 29	vs. Pittsburgh Steelers	L 14–16	1–3	Rosenblatt Stadium
5	September 5	at Los Angeles Rams	L 17–21	1–4	Los Angeles Memorial Coliseum

== Regular season ==
Six games into his rookie season, Dave Parks set a franchise record for longest reception with an 83-yard catch, followed by the team's second longest reception, an 80-yarder, a week later. Both records stood for 13 years.

=== Schedule ===
Week	Date	Opponent	Result	Record	Venue	Recap
1	September 13	**Detroit Lions**	**L** 17–26	0–1	Kezar Stadium	Recap
2	September 20	at Philadelphia Eagles	**W** 28–24	1–1	Franklin Field	Recap
3	September 27	St. Louis Cardinals	**L** 13–23	1–2	Kezar Stadium	Recap
4	October 4	**Chicago Bears**	**W** 31–21	2–2	Kezar Stadium	Recap
5	October 11	at **Green Bay Packers**	**L** 14–24	2–3	Milwaukee County Stadium	Recap
6	October 18	at **Los Angeles Rams**	**L** 14–42	2–4	Los Angeles Memorial Coliseum	Recap
7	October 25	**Minnesota Vikings**	**L** 22–27	2–5	Kezar Stadium	Recap
8	November 1	at **Baltimore Colts**	**L** 7–37	2–6	Memorial Stadium	Recap
9	November 8	at **Minnesota Vikings**	**L** 7–24	2–7	Metropolitan Stadium	Recap
10	November 15	**Green Bay Packers**	**W** 24–14	3–7	Kezar Stadium	Recap
11	November 22	at **Chicago Bears**	**L** 21–23	3–8	Wrigley Field	Recap
12	November 29	**Baltimore Colts**	**L** 3–14	3–9	Kezar Stadium	Recap
13	December 6	**Los Angeles Rams**	**W** 28–7	4–9	Kezar Stadium	Recap
14	December 13	at **Detroit Lions**	**L** 7–24	4–10	Tiger Stadium	Recap
Note: Intra-conference opponents are in **bold** text.

== Standings ==
NFL Western Conference
	W	L	T	PCT	CONF	PF	PA	STK
Baltimore Colts	12	2	0	.857	10–2	428	225	W1
Green Bay Packers (Note: Green Bay was awarded the Playoff Bowl berth from the Western Conference by outscoring Minnesota 65–37 in their two meetings.)	8	5	1	.615	6–5–1	342	245	T1
Minnesota Vikings	8	5	1	.615	6–5–1	355	296	W3
Detroit Lions	7	5	2	.583	6–4–2	280	260	W2
Los Angeles Rams	5	7	2	.417	3–7–2	283	339	T1
Chicago Bears	5	9	0	.357	5–7	260	379	L2
San Francisco 49ers	4	10	0	.286	3–9	236	330	L1

Note: Tie games were not officially counted in the standings until 1972.

== Personnel ==
=== Staff / Coaches ===
1964 San Francisco 49ers staff
Front office: Team Owner - Victor Morabito; General manager – Louis Spadia; Personnel Scout - Dick Gallagher; Head coaches: Head coach - Jack Christiansen; Offensive coaches: Chief of Offense / Offensive Coordinator - Bill Johnson; Offensive Ends – Billy Wilson	Defensive coaches: Defensive Assistant – Dick Voris; Defensive Backfield / Secondary – Jim David; Special teams coaches: None - N/A

=== Roster ===
1964 San Francisco 49ers roster
Quarterbacks (QB): 12 John Brodie; 10 George Mira; Running backs (RB): 32 Rudy Johnson; 17 Billy Kilmer QB; 43 David Kopay; 22 Gary Lewis; 38 Mike Lind; Wide receivers (WR): 30 Bernie Casey; 26 Kay McFarland; 29 Dale Messer; 81 Dave Parks; Tight ends (TE): 82 Bob Poole TE; 85 Monty Stickles	Offensive linemen (OL): 77 Bruce Bosley C; 72 Leon Donohue G; 62 Mike Magac G/T; 63 Frank Morze C; 68 Howard Mudd G; 67 Walt Rock T; 76 Len Rohde T; 78 John Thomas G; Defensive linemen (DL): 86 Dan Colchico DE; 70 Charlie Krueger DT; 60 Roland Lakes DT; 74 Clark Miller DE; 52 Karl Rubke DE; 65 Chuck Sieminski DT	Linebackers (LB): 57 Floyd Dean MLB; 53 Mike Dowdle MLB; 55 Matt Hazeltine OLB; 54 Ed Pine OLB; 64 Dave Wilcox OLB; Defensive backs (DB): 39 Kermit Alexander FS; 16 Charley Britt FS; 37 Jimmy Johnson CB; 45 Elbert Kimbrough SS; 80 Jerry Mertens CB; 48 Ben Scotti CB; 40 Abe Woodson CB; Special teams (ST): 36 Tommy Davis K/P	Reserve: 84 Vern Burke WR (IR); 35 Bill Cooper LB (IR); 42 Don Lisbon RB (IR); 79 Bob St. Clair T (IR); 24 J. D. Smith RB (IR); Rookies in italics
