= Bill Brown (American football) =

American football player, born 1938

No. 38, 30
- Position: Fullback

Personal information
- Born: June 29, 1938; Mendota, Illinois, U.S.
- Died: November 4, 2018 (aged 80); Edina, Minnesota, U.S.
- Listed height: 5 ft 11 in (1.80 m)
- Listed weight: 228 lb (103 kg)

Career information
- High school: Mendota Township
- College: Illinois (1957–1960)
- NFL draft: 1961: 2nd round, 20th overall pick
- AFL draft: 1961: 6th round, 42nd overall pick

Career history
- Chicago Bears (1961); Minnesota Vikings (1962–1974)

Awards and highlights
- NFL champion (1969); 3× Second-team All-Pro (1964, 1965, 1968); 4× Pro Bowl (1964, 1965, 1967, 1968); Minnesota Vikings Ring of Honor; 50 Greatest Vikings; Minnesota Vikings 25th Anniversary Team; Minnesota Vikings 40th Anniversary Team; 2× Second-team All-Big Ten (1959, 1960)

Career NFL statistics
- Rushing yards: 5,838
- Rushing average: 3.5
- Rushing touchdowns: 52
- Receptions: 286
- Receiving yards: 3,183
- Receiving touchdowns: 23
- Stats at Pro Football Reference

William Dorsey Brown (June 29, 1938 – November 4, 2018) was an American professional football player who was a fullback in the National Football League (NFL) for 14 seasons, including 13 seasons with the Minnesota Vikings. He played college football for the Illinois Fighting Illini. He was named to the Pro Bowl four times with the Vikings.

== Early life ==
Brown was born on June 29, 1938, in Mendota, LaSalle County, Illinois. He attended Mendota High School, along with his one-year older brother Jim. Both brothers were all-state in football. While at Mendota, he also was teammates with future Canadian Football League Hall of Famer Ray Jauch. Brown also participated on the track team, and was an Illinois state champion in throwing the shot put as a junior. In his senior year, he had a toss of 57 ft 9 in (17.6 m), which was six inches beyond the state shot put record.

== College ==
After graduating from Mendota, Brown played college football at the University of Illinois at Urbana-Champaign, at fullback.

Brown was an All-Big Ten fullback, and also won the Big Ten shot put title and set an Illinois record with a toss of 54 ft 10.5 in (16.73 m). He was captain of the 1960 football team, and led the Illini in rushing yards in 1959 and 1960, and points in 1959. He was the team's punter (averaging 40.3 yards per punt over three years), while also playing linebacker in 1959. He scored the winning touchdowns in an upset of number 4 ranked Army in 1959, and on the final play against Wisconsin that same year. He was twice selected second-team All-Conference.

== Professional football career ==
Brown was a second round choice (20th overall) of the Chicago Bears in the 1961 NFL draft. He had also been selected in the sixth round of the 1961 AFL draft by the New York Titans. In 1961, he played in the Vikings inaugural game in Metropolitan Stadium, but as a Bear. Brown was traded to the Vikings before the 1962 season, for a fourth-round draft pick in the 1964 NFL draft. Brown played for the Vikings for 13 seasons, including three Super Bowls (IV, VIII, and IX). He was named to the Pro Bowl after the 1964, 1965, 1967, and 1968 NFL seasons.

1964 was his best season, gaining 866 yards rushing, 703 yards on 48 receptions, and including a game high 128 receiving yards and 226 total yards from scrimmage against the Chicago Bears on December 13, 1964. In 1963, he had a 78-yard kickoff return for a touchdown against the Los Angeles Rams. He was selected to the second-team Associated Press All NFL teams in 1964 and 1968. Brown earned the nickname "Boom-Boom" for his reckless, and often violent, running style. His coach, Pro Football Hall of Famer Norm Van Brocklin, gave Brown the nickname.

== Legacy ==
Brown holds many Vikings team records. Brown holds Vikings records for most regular season games played by a running back (180), most consecutive games played by a running back (101), and most games started by a running back (111). He ranks fifth for career rushing yards (5,757), trailing Adrian Peterson (11,747), Robert Smith (6,818), Dalvin Cook (5,993), and Chuck Foreman (5,887). Brown is second in team history for career rushing attempts (1,627), behind Peterson (2,418), and is tied for second in team history with Chuck Foreman in rushing touchdowns (52). He ranks ninth in career points scored (456 on 76 touchdowns), behind Fred Cox, Fuad Reveiz, Cris Carter, Ryan Longwell, Peterson, Randy Moss, Blair Walsh, and Gary Anderson. Brown is fifth in Vikings history in combined total yards gained (9,198), after Peterson (14,108), Carter (12, 410), Darrin Nelson (10,377), and Moss (9,670). He rushed for two touchdowns in a single game ten times. With the retirement of Don Perkins, Brown led active players in career rushing yards for much of the 1970 season, but had been passed by Leroy Kelly by the season finale.

== Honors ==
In 2004, Brown was inducted into the Vikings Ring of Honor. He is a member of the Illinois Valley Sports Hall of Fame.

== Death ==
Brown died on November 4, 2018, at a memory center in Edina, Minnesota where he had resided for five years. Brown had been diagnosed with dementia. His brain was donated to Boston University's Chronic Traumatic Encephalopathy Center, to determine if Brown had CTE, as he had suffered concussions during his playing days. He was survived by his children Scott, Shelley, Kimberly, and Mick. Former Vikings and Oakland Raiders quarterback Rich Gannon was his son-in-law.

== NFL career statistics ==
Legend
	Won NFL championship
	Led the league
**Bold**	Career high

Year	Team	Games		Rushing						Receiving					Fumbles	
Year	Team	GP	GS	Att	Yds	Avg	Y/G	Lng	TD	Rec	Yds	Avg	Lng	TD	Fum	FR
1961	CHI	**14**	3	22	81	3.7	5.8	20	0	2	6	3.0	13	0	2	1
1962	MIN	**14**	2	34	103	3.0	7.4	15	0	10	124	12.4	29	1	1	1
1963	MIN	**14**	13	128	445	3.5	31.8	21	5	17	109	6.4	30	2	7	2
1964	MIN	**14**	**14**	226	**866**	3.8	**61.9**	**48**	7	**48**	**703**	**14.6**	64	**9**	**9**	**4**
1965	MIN	**14**	13	160	699	**4.4**	49.9	40	6	41	503	12.3	47	1	**9**	3
1966	MIN	**14**	**14**	**251**	829	3.3	59.2	33	6	37	359	9.7	56	0	4	1
1967	MIN	**14**	**14**	185	610	3.3	43.6	29	5	22	263	12.0	43	0	3	1
1968	MIN	**14**	**14**	222	805	3.6	57.5	32	**11**	31	329	10.6	57	3	6	2
1969	MIN	12	12	126	430	3.4	35.8	30	3	21	183	8.7	27	0	3	1
1970	MIN	**14**	7	101	324	3.2	23.1	18	0	15	149	9.9	17	2	3	0
1971	MIN	**14**	6	46	136	3.0	9.7	23	2	10	94	9.4	36	0	0	0
1972	MIN	**14**	0	82	263	3.2	18.8	19	4	22	298	13.5	**76**	4	4	0
1973	MIN	**14**	2	47	206	**4.4**	14.7	21	3	5	22	4.4	7	1	2	0
1974	MIN	**14**	0	19	41	2.2	2.9	11	0	5	41	8.2	21	0	3	1
Career		194	114	1,649	5,838	3.5	30.1	48	52	286	3,183	11.1	76	23	56	17
