= 1964 Detroit Lions season =

NFL team season

- Owner: William Clay Ford Sr.
- Head coach: George Wilson
- Home stadium: Tiger Stadium

Results
- Record: 7–5–2
- Division place: 4th NFL Western
- Playoffs: Did not qualify

The 1964 Detroit Lions season was the 31st in Detroit and the 35th in franchise history. They finished at 7–5–2, fourth in the Western conference.

== Offseason ==
- On January 21, William Clay Ford, Lions president since 1961, purchased the team, which as of 2025, continues to be held by the family, currently by his daughter Sheila.
- On March 16, Lions Defensive Tackle Alex Karras was reinstated by Pete Rozelle after being suspended for betting.

=== NFL draft ===
Round	Pick	Player	Position	School
1	5	Pete Beathard	Quarterback	USC
2	20	Matt Snorton	Tight End	Michigan State
3				

== Regular season ==
For the first time since 1950, the Green Bay Packers were not the guest on Thanksgiving Day; they visited Tiger Stadium in late September for a rare Monday night game.

=== Schedule ===
Week	Date	Opponent	Result	Record	Attendance
1	September 13	at San Francisco 49ers	W 26–17	1–0–0	33,204
2	September 19	at Los Angeles Rams	T 17–17	1–0–1	52,001
3	September 28	Green Bay Packers	L 10–14	1–1–1	59,203
4	October 4	New York Giants	W 26–3	2–1–1	54,836
5	October 11	at Minnesota Vikings	W 24–20	3–1–1	40,840
6	October 18	at Chicago Bears	W 10–0	4–1–1	47,567
7	October 25	Baltimore Colts	L 0–34	4–2–1	57,814
8	November 1	Los Angeles Rams	W 37–17	5–2–1	52,064
9	November 6	at Green Bay Packers	L 7–30	5–3–1	42,327
10	November 15	at Cleveland Browns	L 21–37	5–4–1	83,064
11	November 22	Minnesota Vikings	T 23–23	5–4–2	48,291
12	November 26	Chicago Bears	L 24–27	5–5–2	52,231
13	December 6	at Baltimore Colts	W 31–14	6–5–2	60,213
14	December 13	San Francisco 49ers	W 24–7	7–5–2	41,854

- Saturday night (September 19), Monday night (September 28),
  Thursday (November 26: Thanksgiving)

=== Game summaries ===
==== Week 1 ====
Team	1	2	3	4	Total
• Lions	3	13	7	3	26
49ers	7	0	10	0	17

- Date: September 13
- Location: Kezar Stadium, San Francisco, California
- Game weather: 59 °F (15 °C); wind 16 mph (26 km/h)

Scoring summary
1	DET	Wayne Walker 23 yard field goal	DET 3–0
1	SF	Bernie Casey 63 yard pass from John Brodie (Tommy Davis kick)	SF 7–3
2	DET	Wayne Walker 16 yard field goal	SF 7–6
2	DET	Nick Pietrosante 3 yard run (Wayne Walker kick)	DET 13–7
2	DET	Wayne Walker 31 yard field goal	DET 16–7
3	DET	Nick Pietrosante 1 yard run (Wayne Walker kick)	DET 23–7
3	SF	Tommy Davis 41 yard field goal	DET 23–10
3	SF	Bernie Casey 7 yard pass from John Brodie (Tommy Davis kick)	DET 23–17
4	DET	Wayne Walker 26 yard field goal	DET 26–17

==== Week 10: at Cleveland Browns ====
Cleveland Browns 37, Detroit Lions 21

Quarter	1	2	3	4	Total
Lions	14	7	0	0	21
Browns	7	13	7	10	37

at Cleveland Municipal Stadium, Cleveland, Ohio

- Date: November 15
- Game time: 1:30 p.m. EST
- Game weather: 51 °F (11 °C), relative humidity 60%, wind 9 mph (14 km/h)
- Game attendance: 83,064
- TV announcers (CBS): Van Patrick (DET) (second half) and Ken Coleman (CLE) (first half) (play-by-play), Jim Morse (DET) (second half) and Warren Lahr (CLE) (first half) (color commentators)
- Pro-Football-Reference.com

Game information

First Quarter

- CLE - Jim Brown 6 yard rush - (Lou Groza kick) Browns 7-0
- DET - Danny Lewis 92 yard pass from Milt Plum - (Wayne Walker kick) Tied 7-7
- DET - Jim Gibbons 4 yard pass from Milt Plum - (Wayne Walker kick) Lions 14-7

Second Quarter

- CLE - Lou Groza 38 yard field goal - Lions 14-10
- CLE - Jim Brown 2 yard rush - (Lou Groza kick) Browns 17-14
- DET - Terry Barr 39 yard pass from Milt Plum - (Wayne Walker kick) Lions 21-17
- CLE - Lou Groza 47 yard field goal - Lions 21-20

Third Quarter

- CLE - Paul Warfield 8 yard pass from Frank Ryan - (Lou Groza kick) Browns 27-21

Fourth Quarter

- CLE - Lou Groza 36 yard field goal - Browns 30-21
- CLE - Walter Beach 65 yard interception return - (Lou Groza kick) Browns 37-21

Lions

Browns

== Standings ==
NFL Western Conference
	W	L	T	PCT	CONF	PF	PA	STK
Baltimore Colts	12	2	0	.857	10–2	428	225	W1
Green Bay Packers (Note: Green Bay was awarded the Playoff Bowl berth from the Western Conference by outscoring Minnesota 65–37 in their two meetings.)	8	5	1	.615	6–5–1	342	245	T1
Minnesota Vikings	8	5	1	.615	6–5–1	355	296	W3
Detroit Lions	7	5	2	.583	6–4–2	280	260	W2
Los Angeles Rams	5	7	2	.417	3–7–2	283	339	T1
Chicago Bears	5	9	0	.357	5–7	260	379	L2
San Francisco 49ers	4	10	0	.286	3–9	236	330	L1

Note: Tie games were not officially counted in the standings until 1972.

=== Roster ===
1964 Detroit Lions roster
Quarterbacks: 10 Sonny Gibbs; 16 Milt Plum; Running backs: 45 Dan Lewis; 39 Hugh McElhenny; 33 Nick Pietrosante; 34 Nick Ryder; 22 Tom Watkins; Wide receivers: 41 Terry Barr; 89 Gail Cogdill; 25 Pat Studstill; 87 Warren Wells; Tight ends: 80 Jim Gibbons; 84 Hugh McInnis	Offensive linemen: 79 John Gonzaga G; 75 John Gordy G; 70 Daryl Sanders T; 50 Bob Scholtz C; 66 Jim Simon G; 72 J. D. Smith T; 51 Bob Whitlow C/T; Defensive linemen: 76 Roger Brown DT; 71 Alex Karras DT; 65 Roger LaLonde DT; 78 Darris McCord DE; 83 Bill Quinlan DE; 88 Sam Williams DE	Linebackers: 59 Ernie Clark OLB; 53 Dennis Gaubatz MLB/OLB; 57 Wally Hilgenberg OLB; 52 Monte Lee OLB; 56 Joe Schmidt MLB; 55 Wayne Walker OLB/K; Defensive backs: 20 Dick Compton CB; 81 Night Train Lane CB; 28 Yale Lary FS/P; 44 Dick LeBeau CB; 43 Gary Lowe SS; 21 Bruce Maher SS; 47 Wayne Rasmussen FS; 27 Bobby Thompson CB	Inactive: 30 Pat Batten RB; 14 Earl Morrall QB; rookies in italics

== Awards and records ==
- Terry Barr, Outstanding Lineman, Pro Bowl
