= Bob Long =

American football player (1941–2025)

No. 80, 86
- Position: Wide receiver

Personal information
- Born: June 16, 1941; McKeesport, Pennsylvania, U.S.
- Died: March 16, 2025 (aged 83); Brookfield, Wisconsin, U.S.
- Listed height: 6 ft 3 in (1.91 m)
- Listed weight: 205 lb (93 kg)

Career information
- High school: Washington Twp. (Apollo, Pennsylvania)
- College: Wichita State
- NFL draft: 1964: 4th round, 44th overall pick
- AFL draft: 1964: 10th round, 74th overall pick

Career history
- Green Bay Packers (1964–1967); Atlanta Falcons (1968); Washington Redskins (1969); Los Angeles Rams (1970)

Awards and highlights
- 2× Super Bowl champion (I, II); 3× NFL champion (1965, 1966, 1967)

Career NFL statistics
- Receptions: 98
- Receiving yards: 1,539
- Touchdowns: 10
- Stats at Pro Football Reference

Robert Andrew Long (June 16, 1941 – March 16, 2025) was an American professional football player who was a wide receiver in the National Football League (NFL) in the 1960s and 1970s. He won two Super Bowls with the Green Bay Packers. Long attended suburban Pittsburgh's Washington Township High School (near Apollo), and played college football for the Wichita State Shockers.

Long's seven-year pro-career was spent with the Packers, Atlanta Falcons, Washington Redskins and Los Angeles Rams. He was a contributing player of both of Vince Lombardi's NFL teams, the Packers which won Super Bowl I and Super Bowl II and later the Redskins for Lombardi's one year in Washington. Long was inducted into the State of Kansas Hall of Fame in 1965 and the Wichita State Hall of Fame in 1981. In 2008 he was added to the Western Chapter of Pennsylvania Sports Hall of Fame.

== College career ==
Long attended the Municipal University of Wichita (now Wichita State University) where he was a three-year letter winner for basketball. After exhausting his basketball eligibility, he switched for football for the 1963 season.

In that one season, he set both the school season record and the school career record for receiving touchdowns with nine. His nine receiving touchdowns tied one other player as the NCAA best for the season and he led the Missouri Valley Conference (MVC) that year in several offensive categories (receptions, receiving yards, receiving touchdowns, total touchdowns and scoring). For the 1963 season, Long was named MVC All-Conference and honorable mention All America honors.

== Professional career ==
Drafted in the fourth round by the Green Bay Packers in the 1964 NFL Draft and by the San Diego Chargers in the tenth round of the AFL Draft, he signed with the Packers and played on the Green Bay teams that won the NFL Championship in 1965, 1966 and 1967 and won the first two Super Bowls in 1966 and 1967. That Packers team is the only team in NFL history to win three championships in a row in the playoff era.

The Packers traded Long to the Atlanta Falcons in 1968 where he started nine games until he was involved in a car accident and suffered a broken back and internal injuries, ending his season. In the off-season that followed, Long reunited with Lombardi in 1969 with the Washington Redskins after Lombardi reached out to Long to gauge his interest in playing for the Redskins. That season, Long posted career bests for receptions and receiving yards. He spent his final season with the Los Angeles Rams in 1970.

Long, along with Tom Brown, played for both the Green Bay Packers and Washington Redskins under Vince Lombardi and are part of the "Lombardi Legends".

== Personal life and death ==
In the past, he was active in charity events in the state of Wisconsin. He was involved in the NFLPA Retirees for Wisconsin. He raised over $1,500,000 for various charities with the Long Journey to the Super Bowl Raffle he once had. He helped contribute in the past to charities, including the Ray Nitschke Foundation, Special Olympics, Task Force Against Family violence and Alzheimers. He also helped bring the first Pizza Hut to northern Wisconsin from 1968 to 1979. Bob Long had a severe stroke in the early 1990s and since then retired from most of his charitable and social activities.

Long died in Brookfield, Wisconsin, on March 16, 2025, at the age of 83.
