= John McDowell (American football) =

American football player (born 1942)

No. 73, 70, 76, 62
- Positions: Tackle, Guard

Personal information
- Born: February 12, 1942 (age 84); St. Paul, Minnesota, U.S.
- Listed height: 6 ft 3 in (1.91 m)
- Listed weight: 260 lb (118 kg)

Career information
- High school: Saint Thomas (Mendota Heights, Minnesota)
- College: Saint John's (MN) (1960-1963)
- NFL draft: 1964: 9th round, 125th overall pick

Career history
- Green Bay Packers (1964); New York Giants (1965); St. Louis Cardinals (1966); BC Lions (1967–1969)

Career NFL statistics
- Games played: 27
- Games started: 8
- Fumble recoveries: 1
- Stats at Pro Football Reference

John Bernard McDowell (born February 12, 1942, in Saint Paul, Minnesota) is a former offensive tackle in the National Football League (NFL) and played college football at Saint John's of Minnesota.

== Career ==
McDowell was drafted by the Green Bay Packers in the ninth round of the 1964 NFL draft and played that season with the team. The following season, he played with the New York Giants before being a member of the St. Louis Cardinals (Arizona Cardinals) during the 1966 NFL season.

He played at the collegiate level at St. John's University.
