= Donie, Texas =

- Unincorporated community
- Location within the state of Texas Donie (the United States)
- Coordinates: 31°28′38″N 96°13′21″W
- Country: United States
- State: Texas
- County: Freestone
- Elevation: 489 ft (149 m)
- Time zone: UTC-6 (Central (CST))
  - Summer (DST): UTC-5 (CDT)
- ZIP codes: 75838
- GNIS feature ID: 1356156

Donie is an unincorporated community in southern Freestone County, Texas, United States. It lies along State Highway 164 south of the city of Fairfield, the county seat of Freestone County. Its elevation is 489 feet (149 m). Although Donie is unincorporated, it has a post office, with the ZIP code of 75838.
