= Darrell Lester (fullback) =

American football player (1940–2006)

No. 31, 26
- Position: Fullback

Personal information
- Born: November 6, 1940; Lake Charles, Louisiana, U.S.
- Died: October 12, 2006 (aged 65)
- Listed height: 6 ft 2 in (1.88 m)
- Listed weight: 228 lb (103 kg)

Career information
- High school: Lake Charles
- College: LSU; McNeese State (1962-1963)
- NFL draft: 1964: 9th round, 118th overall pick

Career history
- Minnesota Vikings (1964); Denver Broncos (1965-1966)

Career NFL/AFL statistics
- Rushing yards: 102
- Rushing average: 2.7
- Receptions: 2
- Receiving yards: 26
- Total touchdowns: 1
- Stats at Pro Football Reference

Marcus Darrell Lester (November 6, 1940 – October 12, 2006) was an American football player who played as a fullback in the National Football League (NFL) from 1964 to 1966. Born in Lake Charles, Louisiana, he attended Lake Charles High School and Louisiana State University before moving to McNeese State. He was selected by the Minnesota Vikings in the ninth round (118th overall) of the 1964 NFL draft, where he would join up with fellow Lake Charles native Tommy Mason, who had been the Vikings' first pick in the 1961 Expansion Draft. Lester played six games for the Vikings in 1964, making four rushing attempts for a total of 18 yards, with a long of 7 yards. He moved to the Denver Broncos for the 1965 season, but did not register a statistic in any of his 12 games that year. The following season, he played 11 times, making 34 rushing attempts for 84 yards, two receptions for 26 yards and a touchdown, and two kick returns (one punt, one kickoff) for a total of 12 yards. However, he did not play again in the NFL after 1966.
