= Jerry Hill (American football) =

American football player (born 1939)

No. 45
- Position: Fullback

Personal information
- Born: October 12, 1939 (age 87); Torrington, Wyoming, U.S.
- Listed height: 5 ft 11 in (1.80 m)
- Listed weight: 210 lb (95 kg)

Career information
- High school: Lingle (WY)
- College: Wyoming
- NFL draft: 1961: 3rd round, 35th overall pick
- AFL draft: 1961: 2nd round, 11th overall pick

Career history
- Baltimore Colts (1961–1970)

Awards and highlights
- NFL champion (1968); Super Bowl champion (V); 2× All-Skyline Conference (1959, 1960); Sun Bowl champion (1958)

Career NFL statistics
- Rushing yards: 2,668
- Rushing average: 3.8
- Receptions: 117
- Receiving yards: 970
- Total touchdowns: 25
- Stats at Pro Football Reference

Gerald Allen Hill (born October 12, 1939) is an American former professional football player who was a running back for the Baltimore Colts of the National Football League (NFL). He played college football for the Wyoming Cowboys. He is a native of Lingle, Wyoming.

== University of Wyoming ==
Born and raised in southeastern Wyoming, Hill played college football at the University of Wyoming in Laramie under head coach Bob Devaney. He was an All-Skyline Conference running back in 1959 and 1960, and was part of the 1958 team that won the Sun Bowl in his sophomore season.

Hill was selected as Wyoming football's Player of the 20th Century in 1992. He finished his collegiate career with 1,374 rushing yards on 288 carries. He was named as an Honorable Mention All-American in 1959 and 1960.

== Baltimore Colts ==
Selected in the third round (35th overall) of the 1961 NFL draft by the Baltimore Colts. He played with them through 1970, including Super Bowls III and V. Hill was primarily used as a blocking back for other rushers such as Lenny Moore and Tom Matte and protecting John Unitas from blitzing linebackers. Hill's best season was in 1965, when he led the team in rushing with 516 yards.

Baltimore-based National Brewing Company introduced Colt 45 malt liquor in 1963. The Pabst Brewing Company (current owners of the beverage) claims on their website the "Fun Fact" that Colt 45 was named after Hill, who was #45 on the 1963 Baltimore Colts, and not the .45 caliber cartridge of the same name. However, Hill described the claim as a "rumor," and stated that he never made any endorsements or received any royalties for the alleged use of his name. In a 2020 interview, Hill stated that "They wanted to name the product Colt 45 … I just happened to be the Colt who was wearing 45."

== NFL career statistics ==
Legend
	Won the Super Bowl
	Won the NFL championship
**Bold**	Career high

=== Regular season ===
Year	Team	Games		Rushing					Receiving				
Year	Team	GP	GS	Att	Yds	Avg	Lng	TD	Rec	Yds	Avg	Lng	TD
1961	BAL	1	0	1	4	4.0	4	0	0	0	0.0	0	0
1963	BAL	14	4	100	440	**4.4**	20	**5**	**22**	**304**	**13.8**	**55**	**1**
1964	BAL	13	7	88	384	**4.4**	**50**	**5**	14	113	8.1	27	**1**
1965	BAL	14	14	**147**	**516**	3.5	20	**5**	20	112	5.6	20	0
1966	BAL	11	5	104	395	3.8	14	0	5	18	3.6	7	0
1967	BAL	14	5	90	311	3.5	18	2	19	156	8.2	33	0
1968	BAL	9	9	91	360	4.0	21	1	18	161	8.9	19	**1**
1969	BAL	14	6	49	143	2.9	14	2	11	44	4.0	12	0
1970	BAL	12	6	36	115	3.2	15	2	8	62	7.8	13	0
Career		102	56	706	2,668	3.8	50	22	117	970	8.3	55	3

=== Playoffs ===
Year	Team	Games		Rushing					Receiving				
Year	Team	GP	GS	Att	Yds	Avg	Lng	TD	Rec	Yds	Avg	Lng	TD
1964	BAL	1	1	9	31	3.4	8	0	1	**2**	**2.0**	**2**	0
1965	BAL	1	1	16	57	**3.6**	10	0	0	0	0.0	0	0
1968	BAL	3	2	**28**	**99**	3.5	**13**	**1**	**2**	1	0.5	1	0
1970	BAL	3	0	8	23	2.9	8	0	0	0	0.0	0	0
Career		8	4	61	210	3.4	13	1	3	3	1.0	2	0

== Awards and honors ==
- All Skyline Conference Running Back (1959, 1960)
- Inducted into Wyoming Cowboys Hall of Fame, October 29, 1993.
- Wyoming Football Player of the 20th Century
- Member of 1958 Sun Bowl Champions
- Member of 1968 NFL Champions
- Member of Super Bowl V Champions
