= Carver Shannon =

American gridiron football player (born 1938)

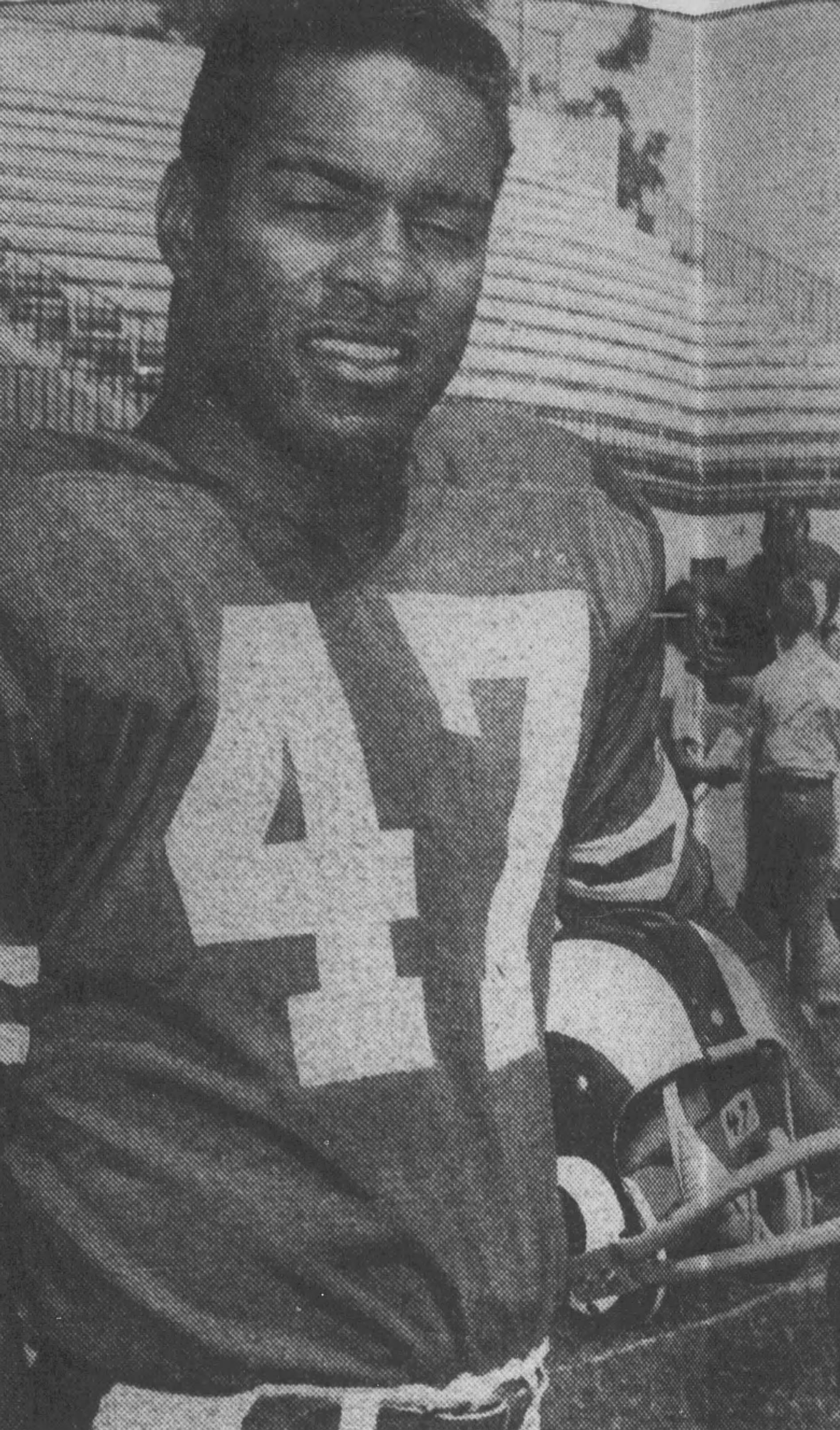
- Shannon with the Los Angeles Rams in 1964

No. 22, 20, 47
- Positions: Defensive back, halfback

Personal information
- Born: April 28, 1938 (age 88); Corinth, Mississippi, U.S.
- Listed height: 6 ft 1 in (1.85 m)
- Listed weight: 198 lb (90 kg)

Career information
- College: Southern Illinois
- NFL draft: 1959: 19th round, 224th overall pick

Career history

Playing
- Winnipeg Blue Bombers (1959–1961); Hamilton Tiger-Cats (1961); Los Angeles Rams (1962–1964)

Coaching
- Long Beach Admirals (1967) Backfield coach

Awards and highlights
- 2× Grey Cup champion (1959, 1961)

Career NFL statistics
- Rushing yards: 35
- Rushing average: 2.1
- Receptions: 4
- Receiving yards: 11
- Interceptions: 4
- Fumble recoveries: 5
- Stats at Pro Football Reference

Carver Beauregard Shannon (born April 28, 1938) was a former American and Canadian football player who played for the Winnipeg Blue Bombers and Hamilton Tiger-Cats. He won the Grey Cup with Winnipeg in 1959 and 1961. He played college football in Carbondale, Illinois with Southern Illinois University where he was nominated for the 1958 All-American team. Shannon was also drafted into the National Football League (NFL) in the 1959 NFL draft by the Los Angeles Rams (Round 19, #224 overall). He played for the Rams from 1962 to 1964, following his career in Canadian football. After his time with the Rams he went to play for the Chicago Bears where he sustained a knee injury and retired from professional football. From 1983 through 1985 Shannon was a line judge in the NFL, wearing uniform number 56. He is a member of the Southern Illinois University Sport Hall of Fame, inducted in 1978. He Lived in Los Angeles, later worked in the aerospace industry, and played in many local celebrity golf tournaments for charity. He died on December 31, 2021.
