= Lenny Moore =

American football player (born 1933)

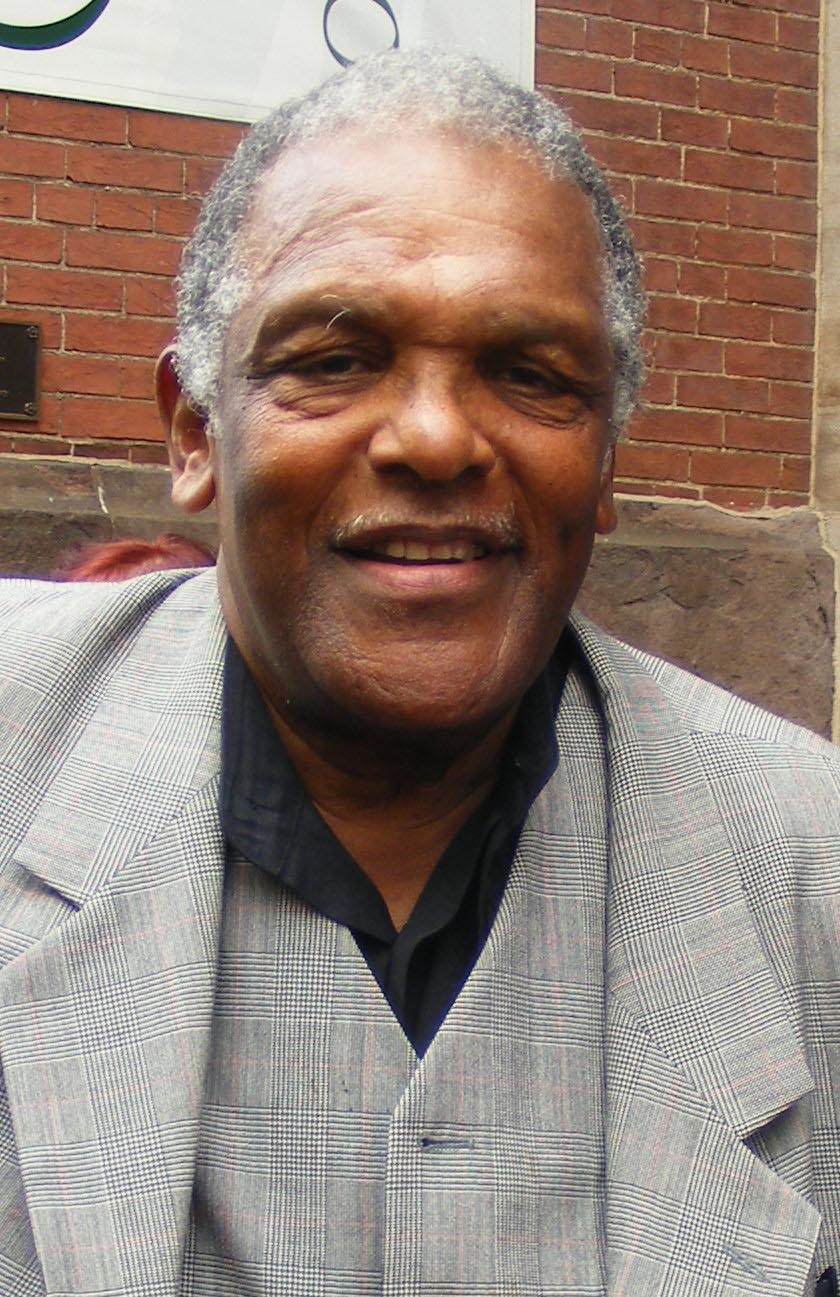
- Moore in 2011

No. 24
- Positions: Halfback, flanker

Personal information
- Born: November 25, 1933 (age 92); Reading, Pennsylvania, U.S.
- Listed height: 6 ft 1 in (1.85 m)
- Listed weight: 191 lb (87 kg)

Career information
- High school: Reading Senior
- College: Penn State (1952–1955)
- NFL draft: 1956: 1st round, 9th overall pick

Career history
- Baltimore Colts (1956–1967)

Awards and highlights
- 2× NFL champion (1958, 1959); NFL Most Valuable Player (1964); NFL Comeback Player of the Year (1964); NFL Rookie of the Year (1956); 5× First-team All-Pro (1958–1961, 1964); 2× Second-team All-Pro (1956, 1957); 7× Pro Bowl (1956, 1958–1962, 1964); NFL rushing touchdowns leader (1964); NFL scoring leader (1964); NFL 1950s All-Decade Team; NFL 100th Anniversary All-Time Team; Baltimore Ravens Ring of Honor; Indianapolis Colts No. 24 retired; 2× Second-team All-American (1954, 1955); 3× First-team All-Eastern (1953–1955); NFL records: Most consecutive games with a touchdown: 17 (tied) (Note: With LaDainian Tomlinson)

Career NFL statistics
- Rushing yards: 5,174
- Rushing average: 4.8
- Rushing touchdowns: 63
- Receptions: 364
- Receiving yards: 6,039
- Receiving touchdowns: 48
- Stats at Pro Football Reference
- Pro Football Hall of Fame

Leonard Edward Moore (born November 25, 1933) is an American former professional football player who was a halfback and flanker for the Baltimore Colts of the National Football League (NFL) from 1956 to 1967. He played college football for the Penn State Nittany Lions.

In the mid-1950s, Moore led the first wave of multi-purpose game-breakers in the modern era of pro football. Whether lined up at halfback, flanker or kick returner, Moore posed considerable matchup problems for defenses because of his deft moves, keen instincts, sure hands and elite burst and straight-away speed.

Moore was selected NFL Rookie of the Year in 1956, NFL Most Valuable Player in 1964 and to the Pro Bowl seven times. He was inducted into the Pro Football Hall of Fame in 1975.

== Early life ==
Born in Reading, Pennsylvania on November 25, 1933, Moore attended Reading Senior High School, where his athleticism earned him the nicknames "The Reading Rocket", "The Reading Rambler", "Lightning Lenny" and "Spats" (for the way he taped his high-top shoes, making them look like low-tops, and one of the first to expose tapings outside the shoes).

== College career ==
Moore's vast potential earned him a football scholarship at Pennsylvania State University. At the time of his enrollment in the fall of 1952, he was the first member of his family to attend college. In an era before freshmen were allowed to play in games and "redshirt" status did not exist, he achieved great success in three seasons on the Nittany Lions varsity, scoring 24 touchdowns in 27 games.

Moore finished as Penn State's all-time leader in 100-rushing yard games (12), rushing yards (2,380), all-purpose yards (3,543), and single-season all-purpose yards (1,486 in 1954).

== Professional career ==
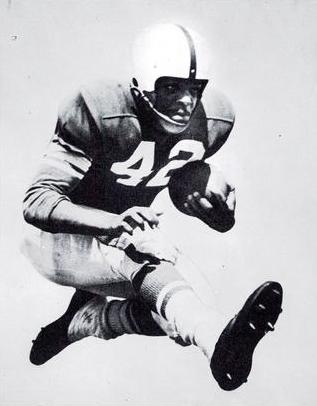
Moore in 1954

Moore's achievements at Penn State did not go unnoticed by scouts from the NFL, and he was taken by the Baltimore Colts ninth overall in the 1956 NFL draft.

Moore was equally adept as a runner and pass receiver, lining up in the backfield as a halfback and split wide as a flanker, and was equally dangerous at both positions in the Colts' offense run by quarterback Johnny Unitas. Moore averaged at least seven yards per carry in three seasons, and has a career average of 4.8 yards per carry. He had 40 receptions for 687 yards and seven touchdowns in 1957, the first of five years in which he would have 40 or more catches. In an era of pounding running games, Moore was a glimpse of things to come in the NFL, with a career average of 30 receptions per year out of the backfield.

During his rookie season in 1956, Moore established himself as one of the most well-rounded runners and receivers in the league, and won the NFL Rookie of the Year award. In 1958, he caught a career-high 50 passes for 938 yards and seven touchdowns in helping the Colts win the NFL championship. In 1959, Moore had 47 receptions for 846 yards and six touchdowns as the Colts repeated as champions.

In a 1962 preseason game against the Pittsburgh Steelers at Forbes Field, Moore was seriously injured being tackled out of bounds while running the ball as a halfback.

He recalled the event in his 2005 memoir: "I hit the ground hard and my knee slid over an exposed spike used to anchor first base during Pittsburgh's baseball season. The spike cracked my kneecap in two. At first I didn't realize how severe the injury was. But as I tried to run back onto the field and join the huddle after the tackle, I was bewildered by the inability to bend my knee. It would only flex so far, and then it would lock up."

The injury would force Moore into a cast encasing his leg from his ankle to his knee, causing him to lose half the 1962 season and ending his consecutive starts streak at 73 games.

Moore lost his starting job in 1963. He rebounded in 1964 with his greatest overall season, scoring 20 touchdowns to lead the league in scoring and helping to lead the Colts to a 12–2 regular-season record and a trip to the NFL Championship Game for the third time in seven years. He was named Comeback Player of the Year and voted Most Valuable Player by his fellow players, remarkable achievements considering he'd played most of the season with complications from appendicitis, and reinforcing his reputation as one of the toughest players in the NFL.

Moore scored a touchdown in an NFL-record 17 consecutive appearances starting in 1963 and continuing through the entire 1964 season, ending in 1965. This record stood for 40 years until being equaled by LaDainian Tomlinson in 2005. Because his streak was interrupted by a five-game absence due to injury in 1963, he does not hold the NFL record for scoring a touchdown in a team's consecutive games, only in games which he appeared.

== Race and football ==
Moore faced the difficult task of being an African American in the NFL during the 1950s and 1960s. Most teams averaged about six African American players on their roster during his time in the league. His race also came into question after his retirement in 1968 when he was not given a long-term contract with CBS Television, ending his attempt to be the first black sports broadcaster for CBS.

Moore occasionally speaks to student groups about his experiences as a black football player during an era when, in the words of Baltimore Sun sportswriter Rick Maese, "Moore could travel with his teammates but couldn't always eat in the same restaurant, couldn't always stay at the same hotel, couldn't always fraternize with them the same way out of the locker room as he had in it."

"There was never anybody ever closer than me and the guys that I played football with on that Baltimore team – on the field," Moore told the Sun. "We were just like glue. One for all, all for one." But "once they blew the whistle and the game was over, they (the white players) went their way, we (the black players) went our way. We split. It was race."

Fellow NFL player Ollie Matson mentored Moore and warned him that "'they're going to call you the big N. You're going to hear it all. So don't get yourself all worked up, because it's going to happen.'"

== Legacy ==
Moore retired from professional football after the 1967 season. In 12 seasons and 143 regular-season games he scored 111 total touchdowns, accumulated 11,213 total yards from scrimmage, made seven Pro Bowls, and five all-NFL teams. His uniform number 24 was retired by Baltimore, and in 1969 a sportswriters' poll named him to the NFL's 50th Anniversary Team.

In 1975 Moore was elected to the Pro Football Hall of Fame, and was named to the NFL's 1950s All Decade Team. In 1999, The Sporting News' ranked Moore 71st on its list of the 100 Greatest Football Players. In 2021, The Athletic listed him as the 92nd greatest player ever. He is the only player in NFL history to have at least 40 receiving touchdowns and 40 rushing touchdowns.

Football Outsiders, in their book Pro Football Prospectus 2007, named six of his seasons among the top 500 running back seasons of all time, which was tied for the 5th most seasons among the top 500 of any player. Moore's retired number is honored along with all of the other Baltimore Colts retired numbers in M&T Bank Stadium in Baltimore, home of the Baltimore Ravens.

On January 19, 2008, Moore was inducted into the East-West Shrine Game Hall of Fame class. Moore was an honorary captain for Penn State's game versus Syracuse on September 12, 2009. It was the first time a former Penn State player had been invited to participate in the pre-game coin toss. Moore is a member of The Pigskin Club of Washington, D.C. National Intercollegiate All-American Football Players Honor Roll.

Moore retired in 2010 from the Maryland Department of Juvenile Services after 26 years of service. His job with the state included traveling to middle and high schools, mixing and mingling with at-risk children, trying to keep them straight. He was a keynote speaker for churches, organizations and youth groups, teaching children and adults about the risks of drugs and he worked to improve the lives of troubled teens.

On October 8, 2013, Moore had a road in Baltimore County named after him in his honor.

Moore's charity work includes raising money for the fight against scleroderma. He holds an annual benefit dinner in memory of his son Leslie, who died at 43 of that disease.

== NFL career statistics ==
Legend
	NEA NFL MVP
	Won NFL Championship
	Led the league
**Bold**	Career high

Year	Team	Games		Rushing						Receiving					Fumbles	
Year	Team	GP	GS	Att	Yds	Avg	Y/G	Lng	TD	Rec	Yds	Avg	Lng	TD	Fum	FR
1956	BAL	12	12	86	**649**	**7.5**	**54.1**	**79**	8	11	102	9.3	27	1	5	1
1957	BAL	12	12	98	488	5.0	40.7	55	3	40	687	17.2	**82**	7	6	2
1958	BAL	12	12	82	598	7.3	49.8	73	7	**50**	**938**	18.8	77	7	5	2
1959	BAL	12	12	92	422	4.6	35.2	31	2	47	846	18.0	71	6	4	1
1960	BAL	12	12	91	374	4.1	31.2	57	4	45	936	20.8	80	**9**	3	1
1961	BAL	13	**13**	92	648	7.0	49.8	54	7	49	728	14.9	72	8	1	0
1962	BAL	10	7	106	470	4.4	47.0	25	2	18	215	11.9	80	2	1	1
1963	BAL	7	6	27	136	5.0	19.4	25	2	21	288	13.7	34	2	2	0
1964	BAL	**14**	12	**157**	584	3.7	41.7	32	**16**	21	472	**22.5**	74	3	**8**	**4**
1965	BAL	12	12	133	464	3.5	38.7	28	5	27	414	15.3	52	3	3	2
1966	BAL	13	8	63	209	3.3	16.1	18	3	21	260	12.4	36	0	2	0
1967	BAL	**14**	0	42	132	3.1	9.4	21	4	13	153	11.8	37	0	1	1
Career		143	118	1,069	5,174	4.8	36.2	79	63	363	6,039	16.6	82	48	41	15
