= 1959 NFL Championship Game =

Coordinates: 39.330°N 76.6015°W

- Cover of the game program
New York Giants (Eastern) (10–2)	Baltimore Colts (Western) (9–3)
16	31
Head coach: Jim Lee Howell	Head coach: Weeb Ewbank
	1	2	3	4	Total
NYG	3	3	3	7	16
BAL	7	0	0	24	31
- Date: December 27, 1959
- Stadium: Memorial Stadium; Baltimore, Maryland
- Attendance: 57,545

TV in the United States
- Network: NBC
- Announcers: Chuck Thompson; Chris Schenkel

Radio in the United States
- Network: NBC
- Announcers: Van Patrick

The 1959 NFL Championship Game was the 27th NFL championship game, played on December 27 at Memorial Stadium in Baltimore, Maryland.

It was a rematch of the 1958 championship game that went into overtime. The defending champion Baltimore Colts (9–3) again won the Western Conference, while the New York Giants (10–2) repeated as Eastern Conference champions. The Colts were favored to repeat as champions by 3½ points.

This game also went down to the last quarter, but the Colts did not need any heroics in overtime. Trailing 9–7 at the start of the fourth quarter, Baltimore scored 24 straight points and won, 31–16.

== Scoring summary ==
Sunday, December 27, 1959
Kickoff: 2:05 p.m. EST

- First quarter
  - BAL – Lenny Moore 60-yard pass from Johnny Unitas (Steve Myhra kick), BAL 7–0
  - NYG – FG Pat Summerall 23, BAL 7–3
- Second quarter
  - NYG – FG Summerall 37, BAL 7–6
- Third quarter
  - NYG – FG Summerall 22, NYG 9–7
- Fourth quarter
  - BAL – Unitas 4-yard run (Myhra kick), BAL 14–9
  - BAL – Jerry Richardson 12-yard pass from Unitas (Myhra kick), BAL 21–9
  - BAL – Johnny Sample 42-yard interception return (Myhra kick), BAL 28–9
  - BAL – FG Myhra 25, BAL 31–9
  - NYG – Bob Schnelker 32-yard pass from Charlie Conerly (Summerall kick), BAL 31–16

== Officials ==
- Referee: Ron Gibbs
- Umpire: Lou Palazzi
- Head linesman: Charlie Berry
- Back judge: Cleo Diehl
- Field judge: Chuck Sweeney
- Alternate: William Downes
- Alternate: Joe Connell
- Alternate: John Highberger
- Alternate: Stan Jaworowski
- Alternate: Herm Rohrig

The NFL had five game officials in 1959; the line judge was added in 1965 and the side judge in 1978.

The officiating crew for 1959 championship game was identical to the one from the previous year.

== Players' shares ==
The gross receipts for the game, including radio and television rights, were just over $666,000, slightly below the previous year. Each player on the winning Colts team received $4,674, while Giants players made $3,083 each.
