= 1964 Washington Redskins season =

NFL team season

- Owner: George Preston Marshall
- General manager: Bill McPeak
- Head coach: Bill McPeak
- Home stadium: D.C. Stadium

Results
- Record: 6–8
- Division place: 3rd (tied) NFL Eastern
- Playoffs: Did not qualify

The 1964 Washington Redskins season was the franchise's 33rd season in the National Football League (NFL) and their 28th in Washington, D.C. The team improved on their 3–11 record from 1963 and finished 6–8. This was the final season to feature the feather logo on the back of the helmet.

== Roster ==
1964 Washington Redskins roster
Quarterbacks (QB): 15 George Izo; 9 Sonny Jurgensen; 14 Dick Shiner; Running backs (RB): 25 Pervis Atkins; 31 Don Bosseler; 37 J. W. Lockett; 42 Charley Taylor; 36 Tom Tracy; Wide receivers (WR): 28 Ozzie Clay; 48 Angelo Coia; 80 Joe Hernandez; 49 Bobby Mitchell; Tight ends (TE): 89 Preston Carpenter; 88 Pat Richter P	Offensive linemen (OL): 74 Steve Barnett G/T; 50 Fred Hageman C; 56 Len Hauss C; 73 Riley Mattson T; 62 John Nisby G; 61 Fran O'Brien T; 65 Vince Promuto G; 71 George Seals T; Defensive linemen (DL): 86 John Paluck DE; 72 Joe Rutgens DT; 78 Ron Snidow DE; 79 Bob Toneff DT; 77 Fred Williams DT	Linebackers (LB): 63 Rod Breedlove OLB; 21 Jimmy Carr OLB; 70 Sam Huff MLB; 66 Carl Kammerer OLB; 53 Bob Pellegrini MLB; 51 John Reger OLB; Defensive backs (DB): 26 Paul Krause FS; 24 Johnny Sample CB; 40 Lonnie Sanders CB; 47 Jim Shorter CB; 41 Jim Steffen SS; 43 Tom Walters SS; Special teams (ST): 38 Jim Martin K	Reserve: Gene Donaldson LB (Military); Rookies in italics

== Preseason ==
Week	Date	Opponent	Result	Record	Venue	Attendance
1	August 8	vs. Detroit Lions	L 27–28	0–1	American Legion Memorial Stadium (Charlotte, NC)	18,763
2	August 15	vs. Chicago Bears	L 13–14	0–2	City Stadium (Richmond, VA)	23,611
3	August 22	vs. New York Giants	W 27–24	1–2	Schoellkopf Field (Ithaca, NY)	19,000
4	August 27	Baltimore Colts	L 14–41	1–3	D.C. Stadium	45,016
5	September 5	vs. St. Louis Cardinals	W 17–10	2–3	Foreman Field (Norfolk, VA)	20,642

== Regular season ==
=== Schedule ===
Week	Date	Opponent	Result	Record	Venue	Attendance	Recap
1	September 13	**Cleveland Browns**	**L** 13–27	0–1	D.C. Stadium	47,577	Recap
2	September 20	at **Dallas Cowboys**	**L** 18–24	0–2	Cotton Bowl	25,158	Recap
3	September 25	at **New York Giants**	**L** 10–13	0–3	Yankee Stadium	62,996	Recap
4	October 4	**St. Louis Cardinals**	**L** 17–23	0–4	D.C. Stadium	49,219	Recap
5	October 11	**Philadelphia Eagles**	**W** 35–20	1–4	D.C. Stadium	49,219	Recap
6	October 18	at **St. Louis Cardinals**	**L** 24–38	1–5	Busch Stadium	23,748	Recap
7	October 25	Chicago Bears	**W** 27–20	2–5	D.C. Stadium	49,219	Recap
8	November 1	at **Philadelphia Eagles**	**W** 21–10	3–5	Franklin Field	60,671	Recap
9	November 8	at **Cleveland Browns**	**L** 24–34	3–6	Cleveland Municipal Stadium	76,385	Recap
10	November 15	at **Pittsburgh Steelers**	**W** 30–0	4–6	Pitt Stadium	31,587	Recap
11	November 22	**Dallas Cowboys**	**W** 28–16	5–6	D.C. Stadium	49,219	Recap
12	November 29	**New York Giants**	**W** 36–21	6–6	D.C. Stadium	49,219	Recap
13	December 6	**Pittsburgh Steelers**	**L** 7–14	6–7	D.C. Stadium	49,219	Recap
14	December 13	at Baltimore Colts	**L** 17–45	6–8	Memorial Stadium	60,213	Recap
Note: Intra-conference opponents are in **bold** text.

=== Season summary ===
==== Week 1: vs. Cleveland Browns ====
Cleveland Browns 27, Washington Redskins 13

Quarter	1	2	3	4	Total
**Browns**	0	13	7	7	**27**
Redskins	0	10	0	3	**13**

at District of Columbia Stadium, Washington, D.C.

- Date: September 13
- Game time: 1:30 p.m. EDT
- Game weather: 58 °F (14 °C), relative humidity 73%, wind 11 mph
- Game attendance: 47,577
- TV announcers (CBS): Ken Coleman (CLE) (second half) and Jim Gibbons (WSH) (first half) (play-by-play), Warren Lahr (CLE) (second half) and Eddie Gallaher (WSH) (first half) (color commentators)
- Pro-Football-Reference.com

Game information

Second Quarter

- WSH – Jim Martin 12 yard field goal – **Redskins 3–0**
- WSH – Charley Taylor 17 yard run – (Jim Martin kick) **Redskins 10–0**
- CLE – Gary Collins 23 yard pass from Frank Ryan – (kick failed) **Redskins 10–6**
- CLE – Jim Brown 1 yard run – (Lou Groza kick) **Browns 13-10**

Third Quarter

- CLE – Jim Brown 1 yard run – (Lou Groza kick) **Browns 20–10**

Fourth Quarter

- WSH – Jim Martin 14 yard field goal – **Browns 20–13**
- CLE – Ernie Green 1 yard run – (Lou Groza kick) **Browns 27–13**

Browns

Redskins

==== Week 5 ====
Team	1	2	3	4	Total
Eagles	0	0	20	0	20
• **Redskins**	14	7	7	7	35

- Date: October 11
- Location: D.C. Stadium • Washington, D.C.
- Game weather: 46 °F (8 °C), wind 13 mph

Scoring summary
1	WSH	Bobby Mitchell 29 yard pass from Sonny Jurgensen (Jim Martin kick)	Redskins 7–0
1	WSH	J.W. Lockett 22 yard pass from Sonny Jurgensen (Jim Martin kick)	Redskins 14–0
2	WSH	Bobby Mitchell 9 yard pass from Sonny Jurgensen (Jim Martin kick)	Redskins 21–0
3	PHI	Timmy Brown 27 yard run (Sam Baker kick)	Redskins 21–7
3	PHI	Timmy Brown 14 yard pass from Norm Snead (kick failed)	Redskins 21–13
3	WSH	Charley Taylor 66 yard pass from Sonny Jurgensen (Jim Martin kick)	Redskins 28–13
3	PHI	Timmy Brown 5 yard run (Sam Baker kick)	Redskins 28–20
4	WSH	Charley Taylor 24 yard pass from Sonny Jurgensen (Jim Martin kick)	Redskins 35–20

The first meeting between the two teams since they traded quarterbacks in the offseason.

==== Week 9: at Cleveland Browns ====
Cleveland Browns 34, Washington Redskins 24

Quarter	1	2	3	4	Total
Redskins	0	3	7	14	**24**
**Browns**	0	13	14	7	**34**

at Cleveland Municipal Stadium, Cleveland, Ohio

- Date: November 8
- Game time: 1:30 p.m. EST
- Game weather: 45 °F (7 °C), relative humidity 94%, wind 6 mph
- Game attendance: 76,385
- TV announcers (CBS): Jim Gibbons (WSH) (second half) and Ken Coleman (CLE) (first half) (play-by-play), Eddie Gallaher (WSH) (second half) and Warren Lahr (CLE) (first half) (color commentators)
- Pro-Football-Reference.com

Game information

Second Quarter

- WSH – Jim Martin 30 yard field goal – **Redskins 3–0**
- CLE – Ernie Green 21 yard rush – (Lou Groza kick) **Browns 7-3**
- CLE – Lou Groza 11 yard field goal – **Browns 10-3**
- CLE – Lou Groza 38 yard field goal – **Browns 13-3**

Third Quarter

- CLE – Gary Collins 13 yard pass from Jim Brown – (Lou Groza kick) **Browns 20-3**
- WSH – Bobby Mitchell 14 yard pass from Sonny Jurgensen – (Jim Martin kick) **Browns 20-10**
- CLE – Paul Warfield 62 yard pass from Frank Ryan – (Lou Groza kick) **Browns 27-10**

Fourth Quarter

- WSH – Charley Taylor 10 yard pass from Sonny Jurgensen – (Jim Martin kick) **Browns 27-17**
- CLE – Jim Brown 2 yard rush – (Lou Groza kick) **Browns 34-17**
- WSH – Bobby Mitchell 14 yard pass from Sonny Jurgensen – (Jim Martin kick) **Browns 34-24**

Redskins

Browns

== Standings ==
NFL Eastern Conference
	W	L	T	PCT	CONF	PF	PA	STK
Cleveland Browns	10	3	1	.769	9–2–1	415	293	W1
St. Louis Cardinals	9	3	2	.750	8–2–2	357	331	W4
Philadelphia Eagles	6	8	0	.429	6–6	312	313	L1
Washington Redskins	6	8	0	.429	5–7	307	305	L2
Dallas Cowboys	5	8	1	.385	4–7–1	250	289	W1
Pittsburgh Steelers	5	9	0	.357	5–7	253	315	L1
New York Giants	2	10	2	.167	2–8–2	241	399	L4

Note: Tie games were not officially counted in the standings until 1972.
