= 1964 Cleveland Browns season =

NFL team season

- Owner: Art Modell
- General manager: Harold Sauerbrei
- Head coach: Blanton Collier
- Home stadium: Cleveland Stadium

Results
- Record: 10–3–1
- Division place: 1st NFL Eastern
- Playoffs: Won NFL Championship (vs. Colts) 27–0
- Pro Bowlers: FB Jim Brown; DE Bill Glass; OLB Jim Houston; DT Dick Modzelewski; QB Frank Ryan; T Dick Schafrath; SE Paul Warfield

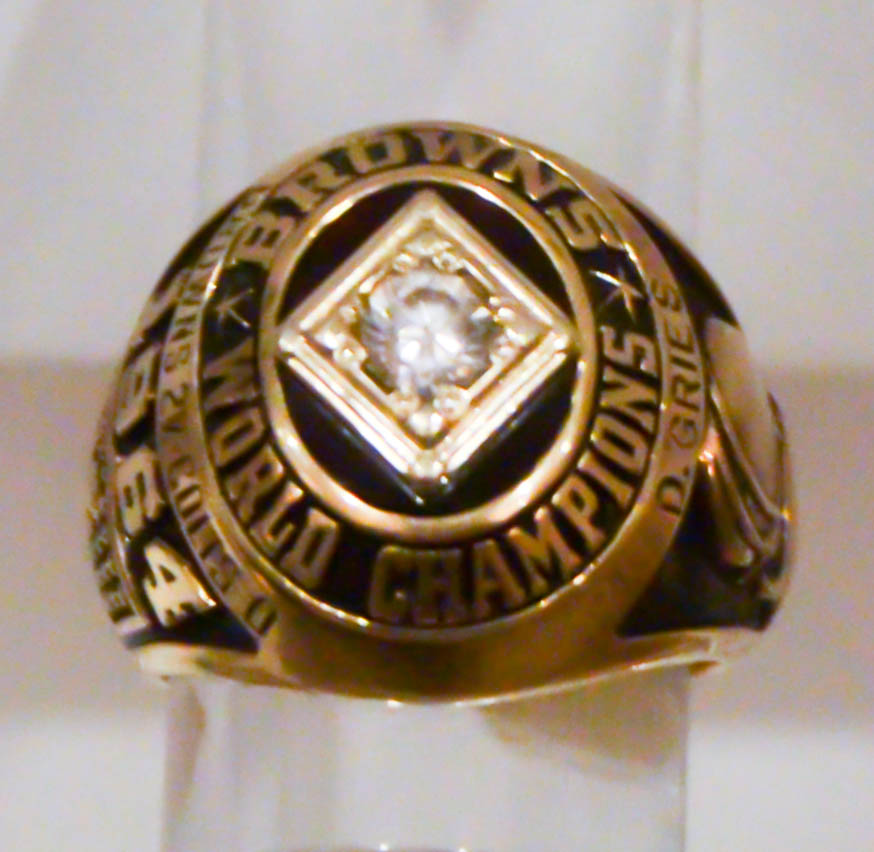
1964 Cleveland Browns World Championship ring

The 1964 Cleveland Browns season was the team's 19th season, and 15th season with the National Football League. The Browns won the NFL Championship, despite having not made the playoffs in six seasons.

== Regular season ==
The regular season was a success with the Browns finishing with a regular season record of 10–3–1. They were coached by Blanton Collier who had replaced Paul Brown the previous season. The team had a tremendous amount of heart, which was demonstrated by the fact that they had key commanding wins throughout the season. For instance, they swept their arch rival New York Giants, who the previous year had edged them out as the eastern conference champion. Not only did they win both times that they played against the Giants but both wins were very convincing, the first being a 42–20 home victory and the second being a 52–20 away victory. The second victory over the Giants was a clutch, season ending game that clinched the eastern conference title. Many of the Browns' wins during the regular season were in a very commanding manner, with a 37–21 win over the Detroit Lions being a prime example. The win over the Lions carried extra significance due to the fact that the Lions had been the team that knocked them out of the conference champion hunt the previous season by beating them 38–10 in the second to last regular season game.

The Browns were led by Hall of Fame running back Jim Brown, who rushed for 1,446 yards with a 5.2 yards/carry average. The quarterback, Frank Ryan, threw for 2,404 yards, 25 touchdowns, and 19 interceptions. The top receivers were Paul Warfield and Gary Collins, the second of whom is known for catching three touchdowns in the championship game against the heavily favored Baltimore Colts.

== Championship Game ==
Leading into the game, the Browns were huge underdogs. Most experts had them losing by double digits. Baltimore was so heavily favored that after the Browns won the game, Sports Illustrated had to scramble to find a picture of a Browns player (in this case, quarterback Frank Ryan) to put on its cover. Baltimore had the league's best offense and had a league best record of 12–2. They were stacked with future Hall of Famers such as Johnny Unitas, Lenny Moore, and John Mackey. The Browns though, were unfazed by the apparent talent disparity and Jim Brown was reported stating before the game, "we're going to kick their [butt] today." The game-time temperature that day was 34 degrees and felt much colder in 15- to 25-mph winds whipping under gray December sky. The Municipal Stadium crowd of 79,544 was the second largest in NFL title-game history at the time. The Browns knew that if they wanted to be in the game they had to make a statement early on, and they did just that. Galen Fiss, the Browns team captain, broke up a screen pass from Unitas to Moore, sending Moore airborne for a loss. The Browns tenacity on defense is what got them to the half time score of 0–0. Brown's running back Ernie Green reported after the game about half time, "We cleaned ourselves and sat down, and it seemed like something came over all of us. I think we all kind of looked at each other and concluded, 'Hey, we can beat these guys.'" Not only did the Browns "beat" the Colts in the second half, They destroyed them, scoring 27 unanswered points. Gary Collins became a Cleveland Browns legend by catching three touch down passes, the third one being a 51-yarder with Colts defender Bobby Boyd all over him. The biggest story of the game was how well Cleveland's defense played against Baltimore's heralded offense. Cleveland was able to hold Unitas to just 95 yards while intercepting him twice.

== Lasting value ==
This was the last major sports championship won by a Cleveland-based team until 2016, when the Cleveland Cavaliers, a team that was formed in 1970, defeated the defending champion Golden State Warriors in a seven-game NBA Finals. Not only is it remembered in Cleveland but ESPN ranks the '64 title game as the second-greatest NFL postseason upset, behind only Joe Namath's guaranteed win over the Colts in Super Bowl III four seasons later.

== Offseason ==
=== 1964 draft class ===
1964 Cleveland Browns draft
Round	Pick	Player	Position	College	Notes
1	11	Paul Warfield * ^{†}	Wide receiver	Ohio State	
2	26	Billy Truax	Defensive end	LSU	
4	54	Don Shackelford	Tackle	Pacific	
5	67	Dick Klein	Tackle	Wichita State	
7	95	Sammy Odom	Linebacker	Northwestern State	
8	110	Leroy Kelly * ^{†}	Running back	Morgan State	
9	123	John Briscoe	Linebacker	Arizona	
10	135	Bobby Robinson	Guard	Mississippi	
10	138	Dick Van Raaphorst	Kicker	Ohio State	
11	151	Eddie Versprille	Fullback	Alabama	
12	166	Ed Mitchell	Tackle	Southern	
13	179	Bob Meehan	Guard	Syracuse	
14	194	Terry Sieg	Running back	Virginia	
15	207	John Houtman	Tackle	Michigan	
16	222	Sid Williams	Linebacker	Southern	
17	235	Larry Bartolameolli	Tackle	Western Michigan	
18	250	Sherman Lewis	Defensive back	Michigan State	
19	263	Jim Higgins	Guard	Xavier	
20	278	Dave Archer	Tackle	Syracuse	
Made roster † Pro Football Hall of Fame * Made at least one Pro Bowl during career

== Exhibition schedule ==
Week	Date	Opponent	Result	Score	Record	Stadium	Attendance	Time (ET)	Local TV	Radio
1	August 9	at San Francisco 49ers	L	7–26	0–1	Kezar Stadium	27,404	4:30 PM EDT		WGAR–AM
2	August 15	at Los Angeles Rams	W	56–31	1–1	Los Angeles Memorial Coliseum	43,183	11:00 PM EDT	WEWS-TV	WERE–AM
3	August 22	vs. Pittsburgh Steelers (at Akron)	W	42–7	2–1	Rubber Bowl	27,255	8:00 PM EDT		WERE–AM
4	August 28	at Detroit Lions	W	35–14	3–1	Tiger Stadium	36,946	8:00 PM EDT	WEWS-TV	WGAR–AM
5	September 5	Green Bay Packers	W	20–17	4–1	Cleveland Stadium	83,736	9:00 PM EDT		WGAR–AM

Notes:

^{a} All times are Eastern time.

There was a doubleheader on September 5, 1964, Giants vs Lions and Packers vs Browns.

== Regular season schedule ==
Week	Date	Opponent	Result	Score	Record	Stadium	Attendance	Time (ET)	Network	Radio	Recap
1	September 13	at Washington Redskins	W	27–13	1–0	District of Columbia Stadium	47,577	1:30 PM EDT	CBS	WGAR–AM	Recap
2	September 20	St. Louis Cardinals	T	33–33	1–0–1	Cleveland Stadium	76,954	1:30 PM EDT	CBS	WGAR–AM	Recap
3	September 27	at Philadelphia Eagles	W	28–20	2–0–1	Franklin Field	60,671	1:30 PM EDT	CBS	WGAR–AM	Recap
4	October 4	Dallas Cowboys	W	27–6	3–0–1	Cleveland Stadium	72,062	1:30 PM EDT	CBS	WGAR–AM	Recap
5	October 10	Pittsburgh Steelers	L	7–23	3–1–1	Cleveland Stadium	80,530	8:00 PM EDT	Sports Network Incorporated (SNI)	WERE–AM	Recap
6	October 18	at Dallas Cowboys	W	20–16	4–1–1	Cotton Bowl	37,456	2:30 PM EDT	CBS	WERE–AM	Recap
7	October 25	New York Giants	W	42–20	5–1–1	Cleveland Stadium	81,050	1:30 PM EST	CBS	WERE–AM	Recap
8	November 1	Pittsburgh Steelers	W	30–17	6–1–1	Pitt Stadium	49,568	1:30 PM EST	CBS	WERE–AM	Recap
9	November 8	Washington Redskins	W	34–24	7–1–1	Cleveland Stadium	76,385	1:30 PM EST	CBS	WERE–AM	Recap
10	November 15	Detroit Lions	W	37–21	8–1–1	Cleveland Stadium	83,064	1:30 PM EST	CBS	WERE–AM	Recap
11	November 22	vs. Green Bay Packers (at Milwaukee)	L	21–28	8–2–1	Milwaukee County Stadium	48,065	2:00 PM EST	CBS	WERE–AM	Recap
12	November 29	Philadelphia Eagles	W	38–24	9–2–1	Cleveland Stadium	79,289	1:30 PM EST	CBS	WERE–AM	Recap
13	December 6	at St. Louis Cardinals	L	19–28	9–3–1	Busch Stadium	31,585	2:00 PM EST	CBS	WERE–AM	Recap
14	December 12	at New York Giants	W	52–20	10–3–1	Yankee Stadium	63,007	2:00 PM EST	CBS	WERE–AM	Recap

Note:^{a} All times are Eastern time. (UTC–4; UTC–5 starting October 25)

== Game summaries ==
=== Week 1: at Washington Redskins ===
Cleveland Browns 27, Washington Redskins 13

Team	1	2	3	4	Total
• Browns	0	13	7	7	27
Redskins	0	10	0	3	13

- Date: September 13
- Location: District of Columbia Stadium, Washington, DC
- Game start: 1:30 p.m. EDT
- Game attendance: 47,577
- Game weather: 58 °F (14 °C); wind 11 mph
- Referee: Harry Brubaker
- TV announcers (CBS): Ken Coleman (CLE) (second half) and Jim Gibbons (WSH) (first half) (play–by–play), Warren Lahr (CLE) (second half) and Eddie Gallaher (WSH) (first half) (color commentators)

Scoring summary
Q2	WSH	Martin 12 yard field goal	WSH 3–0
Q2	WSH	Taylor 17 yard rush (Martin kick)	WSH 10–0
Q2	CLE	Collins 23 yard pass from Ryan (kick failed)	WSH 10–6
Q2	CLE	Brown 1 yard rush (Groza kick)	CLE 13–10
Q3	CLE	Brown 1 yard rush (Groza kick)	CLE 20–10
Q4	WSH	Martin 14 yard field goal	CLE 20–13
Q4	CLE	Green 1 yard rush (Groza kick)	CLE 27–13

=== Week 2: vs. St. Louis Cardinals ===
St. Louis Cardinals 33, Cleveland Browns 33

Team	1	2	3	4	Total
Cardinals	10	3	10	10	33
Browns	6	10	7	10	33

- Date: September 20
- Location: Cleveland Stadium, Cleveland, Ohio
- Game start: 1:30 p.m. EDT
- Game attendance: 76,954
- Game weather: 67 °F (19 °C); wind 7 mph
- Referee: Tom Bell
- TV announcers (CBS): Jack Drees (STL) (second half) and Ken Coleman (CLE) (first half) (play–by–play), Bill Fischer (second half) (STL) and Warren Lahr (first half) (CLE) (color commentators)

Scoring summary
Q1	STL	Crow 22 yard pass from Johnson (Bakken kick)	STL 7–0
Q1	CLE	Groza 32 yard field goal	STL 7–3
Q1	CLE	Groza 12 yard field goal	STL 7–6
Q1	STL	Bakken 30 yard field goal	STL 10–6
Q2	CLE	Groza 37 yard field goal	STL 10–9
Q2	STL	Bakken 51 yard field goal	STL 13–9
Q2	CLE	Warfield 40 yard pass from Ryan (Groza kick)	CLE 16–13
Q3	STL	Randle 38 yard pass from Johnson (Bakken kick)	STL 20–16
Q3	STL	Bakken 44 yard field goal	STL 23–16
Q3	CLE	Collins 7 yard pass from Ryan (Groza kick)	Tie 23–23
Q4	STL	Randle 50 yard pass from Johnson (Bakken kick)	STL 30–23
Q4	CLE	Groza 25 yard field goal	STL 30–26
Q4	CLE	Brown 1 yard rush (Groza kick)	CLE 33–30
Q4	STL	Bakken 28 yard field goal	Tie 33–33

=== Week 3: at Philadelphia Eagles ===
Cleveland Browns 28, Philadelphia Eagles 20

Team	1	2	3	4	Total
• Browns	7	0	14	7	28
Eagles	7	6	0	7	20

- Date: September 27
- Location: Franklin Field, Philadelphia, Pennsylvania
- Game start: 1:30 p.m. EDT
- Game attendance: 60,671
- Game weather: 64 °F (18 °C); wind 12 mph
- Referee: George Rennix
- TV announcers (CBS): Ken Coleman (CLE) (second half) and Jack Whitaker (PHI) (first half) (play–by–play), Warren Lahr (CLE) (second half) and Art Pollard (PHI) (first half) (color commentators)

Scoring summary
Q1	CLE	Green 37 yard run (Groza kick)	CLE 7–0
Q1	PHI	Matson 1 yard rush (Baker kick)	Tie 7–7
Q2	PHI	Baker 12 yard field goal	PHI 10–7
Q2	PHI	Baker 42 yard field goal	PHI 13–7
Q3	CLE	Warfield 24 yard pass from Ryan (Groza kick)	CLE 14–13
Q3	CLE	Brown 40 yard pass from Ryan (Groza kick)	CLE 21–13
Q4	CLE	Collins 12 yard pass from Ryan (Groza kick)	CLE 28–13
Q4	PHI	Matson 7 yard rush (Baker kick)	CLE 28–20

=== Week 4: vs. Dallas Cowboys ===
Cleveland Browns 27, Dallas Cowboys 6

Team	1	2	3	4	Total
Cowboys	0	6	0	0	6
• Browns	7	6	7	7	27

- Date: October 4
- Location: Cleveland Stadium, Cleveland, Ohio
- Game start: 1:30 p.m. EDT
- Elapsed time: 2:33
- Game attendance: 72,062
- Game weather: 56 °F (13 °C); wind 14 mph
- Referee: Norm Schachter
- TV announcers (CBS): Frank Glieber (DAL) (second half) and Ken Coleman (CLE) (first half) (play–by–play), Davey O'Brien (DAL) (second half) and Warren Lahr (CLE) (first half) (color commentators)

Scoring summary
Q1	11:21	CLE	Green 7 yard pass from Ryan (Groza kick)	CLE 7–0
Q2	4:47	CLE	Groza 19 yard field goal	CLE 10–0
Q2	13:06	DAL	Norman 5 yard pass from Roach (kick failed)	CLE 10–6
Q2	14:55	CLE	Groza 21 yard field goal	CLE 13–6
Q3	14:46	CLE	Warfield 40 yard pass from Ryan (Groza kick) (Groza kick)	CLE 20–6
Q4	2:35	CLE	Collins 38 yard pass from Ryan (Groza kick) (Groza kick)	CLE 27–6

=== Week 5: vs. Pittsburgh Steelers ===
Pittsburgh Steelers 23, Cleveland Browns 7

Team	1	2	3	4	Total
• Steelers	10	6	7	0	23
Browns	0	7	0	0	7

- Date: October 10
- Location: Cleveland Stadium, Cleveland, Ohio
- Game start: 8:00 p.m. EDT
- Game attendance: 80,530
- Game weather: 40 °F (4 °C); wind 14 mph
- TV announcers (Sports Network Incorporated (SNI)): Ken Coleman (play–by–play), Warren Lahr (color commentator)

Scoring summary
Q1	PIT	Clark 21 yard field goal	PIT 3–0
Q1	PIT	Johnson 33 yard rush (Clark kick)	PIT 10–0
Q2	PIT	Johnson 45 yard rush (kick failed)	PIT 16–0
Q2	CLE	Collins 18 yard pass from Ryan (Groza kick) (Groza kick)	PIT 16–7
Q3	PIT	Johnson 5 yard rush (Clark kick)	PIT 23–7

=== Week 6: at Dallas Cowboys ===
Cleveland Browns 20, Dallas Cowboys 16

Team	1	2	3	4	Total
• Browns	7	6	0	7	20
Cowboys	0	6	10	0	16

- Date: October 18
- Location: Cotton Bowl, Dallas, Texas
- Game start: 2:30 p.m. EDT
- Elapsed time: 2:55
- Game attendance: 37,456
- Game weather: 68 °F (20 °C); wind 16 mph
- TV announcers (CBS): Ken Coleman (CLE) (second half) and Frank Glieber (DAL) (first half) (play–by–play), Warren Lahr (CLE) (second half) and Davey O'Brien (DAL) (first half) (color commentators)

Scoring summary
Q1	2:42	CLE	Green 1 yard rush (Groza kick)	CLE 7–0
Q2	0:04	DAL	Raaphorst 34 yard field goal	CLE 7–3
Q2	4:11	CLE	Groza 34 yard field goal	CLE 10–3
Q2	5:10	CLE	Groza 30 yard field goal	CLE 13–3
Q2	14:45	DAL	Raaphorst 20 yard field goal	CLE 13–6
Q3	5:42	DAL	Raaphorst 37 yard field goal	CLE 13–9
Q3	14:37	DAL	Perkins 1 yard rush (Raaphorst kick)	DAL 16–13
Q4	8:31	CLE	Parrish 54 yard interception return (Groza kick)	CLE 20–16

=== Week 7: vs. New York Giants ===
Cleveland Browns 42, New York Giants 20

Team	1	2	3	4	Total
Giants	6	0	7	7	20
• Browns	0	7	7	28	42

- Date: October 25
- Location: Cleveland Stadium, Cleveland, Ohio
- Game start: 1:30 p.m. EST
- Game attendance: 72,062
- Game weather: 50 °F (10 °C); wind 14 mph
- Referee: Norm Schachter
- TV announcers (CBS): Chris Schenkel (NY) (second half) and Ken Coleman (CLE) (first half) (play–by–play), Pat Summerall (NY) (second half) and Warren Lahr (CLE) (first half) (color commentators)

Scoring summary
Q1	NY	James 1 yard rush - (kick failed)	NY 6–0
Q2	CLE	Kelly 68 yard punt return (Groza kick)	CLE 7–6
Q3	CLE	Warfield 11 yard pass from Ryan (Groza kick) (Groza kick)	CLE 14–6
Q3	NY	Tittle 7 yard rush (Chandler kick)	CLE 14–13
Q4	CLE	Wiggin 2 yard fumble return (Groza kick)	CLE 21–13
Q4	CLE	Collins 9 yard pass from Ryan (Groza kick) (Groza kick)	CLE 28–13
Q4	CLE	Scales 23 yard fumble return (Groza kick)	CLE 35–13
Q4	NY	Wheelwright 20 yard pass from Wood (Chandler kick)	CLE 35–20
Q4	CLE	Brewer 11 yard pass from Ninowski (Groza kick)	CLE 42–20

=== Week 8: at Pittsburgh Steelers ===
Cleveland Browns 30, Pittsburgh Steelers 17

Team	1	2	3	4	Total
• Browns	0	10	10	10	30
Steelers	0	10	0	7	17

- Date: November 1
- Location: Pitt Stadium, Pittsburgh, Pennsylvania
- Game start: 1:30 p.m. EST
- Game attendance: 49,568
- Game weather: 51 °F (11 °C); wind 6 mph
- TV announcers (CBS): Ken Coleman (CLE) (second half) and Joe Tucker (PIT) (first half) (play–by–play), Warren Lahr (CLE) (second half) and Johnny Sauer (PIT) (first half) (color commentators)

Scoring summary
Q2	CLE	Groza 36 yard field goal	CLE 3–0
Q2	CLE	McNeil 25 yard pass from Ryan (Groza kick) (Groza kick)	CLE 10–0
Q2	PIT	Peaks 5 yard rush (Clark kick)	CLE 10–7
Q2	PIT	Clark 26 yard field goal	Tie 10–10
Q3	CLE	Green 7 yard rush (Groza kick)	CLE 17–10
Q3	CLE	Groza 22 yard field goal	CLE 20–10
Q4	CLE	Groza 16 yard field goal	CLE 23–10
Q4	PIT	Johnson 1 yard rush (Clark kick)	CLE 23–17
Q4	CLE	Green 13 yard rush (Groza kick)	CLE 30–17

=== Week 9: vs. Washington Redskins ===
Cleveland Browns 34, Washington Redskins 24

Team	1	2	3	4	Total
Redskins	0	3	7	14	24
• Browns	0	13	14	7	34

- Date: November 8
- Location: Cleveland Stadium, Cleveland, Ohio
- Game start: 1:30 p.m. EST
- Game attendance: 76,385
- Game weather: 45 °F (7 °C); wind 6 mph
- Referee: George Rennix
- TV announcers (CBS): Jim Gibbons (WSH) (second half) and Ken Coleman (CLE) (first half) (play–by–play), Eddie Gallaher (WSH) (second half) and Warren Lahr (CLE) (first half) (color commentators)

Scoring summary
Q2	WSH	Martin 30 yard field goal	WSH 3–0
Q2	CLE	Green 21 yard rush (Groza kick)	CLE 7–3
Q2	CLE	Groza 11 yard field goal	CLE 10–3
Q2	CLE	Groza 38 yard field goal	CLE 13–3
Q3	CLE	Collins 13 yard pass from Brown (Groza kick) (Groza kick)	CLE 20–3
Q3	WSH	Mitchell 14 yard pass from Jurgensen (Martin kick)	CLE 20–10
Q3	CLE	Warfield 62 yard pass from Ryan (Groza kick) (Groza kick)	CLE 27–10
Q4	WSH	Taylor 10 yard pass from Jurgensen (Martin kick)	CLE 27–17
Q4	CLE	Brown 2 yard rush (Groza kick)	CLE 34–17
Q4	WSH	Mitchell 14 yard pass from Jurgensen (Martin kick)	CLE 34–24

=== Week 10: vs. Detroit Lions ===
Cleveland Browns 37, Detroit Lions 21

Team	1	2	3	4	Total
Lions	14	7	0	0	21
• Browns	7	13	7	10	37

- Date: November 15
- Location: Cleveland Stadium, Cleveland, Ohio
- Game start: 1:30 p.m. EST
- Game attendance: 83,064
- Game weather: 51 °F (11 °C); wind 9 mph
- Referee: Tony Skovar
- TV announcers (CBS): Van Patrick (DET) (second half) and Ken Coleman (CLE) (first half) (play–by–play), Jim Morse (DET) (second half) and Warren Lahr (CLE) (first half) (color commentators)

Scoring summary
Q1	CLE	Brown 6 yard rush (Groza kick)	CLE 7–0
Q1	DET	Lewis 92 yard pass from Plum (Walker kick)	Tie 7–7
Q1	DET	Gibbons 4 yard pass from Plum (Walker kick)	DET 14–7
Q2	CLE	Groza 38 yard field goal	DET 14–10
Q2	CLE	Brown 2 yard rush (Groza kick)	CLE 17–14
Q2	DET	Barr 39 yard pass from Plum (Walker kick)	DET 21–17
Q2	CLE	Groza 47 yard field goal	DET 21–20
Q3	CLE	Warfield 8 yard pass from Ryan (Groza kick) (Groza kick)	CLE 27–21
Q4	CLE	Groza 36 yard field goal	CLE 30–21
Q4	CLE	Beach 65 yard interception return (Groza kick)	CLE 37–21

=== Week 11: at Green Bay Packers ===
Green Bay Packers 28, Cleveland Browns 21

Team	1	2	3	4	Total
Browns	14	0	0	7	21
• Packers	7	0	14	7	28

- Date: November 22
- Location: Milwaukee County Stadium, Milwaukee, Wisconsin
- Game start: 2:00 p.m. EST
- Game attendance: 48,065
- Game weather: 15 °F (−9 °C); wind 15 mph; wind chill 0 °F (−18 °C)
- TV announcers (CBS): Ken Coleman (CLE) (second half) and Earl Gillespie (GB) (first half) (play–by–play), Warren Lahr (CLE) (second half) and Tony Canadeo (GB) (first half) (color commentators)

Scoring summary
Q1	CLE	Warfield 48 yard pass from Ryan (Groza kick) (Groza kick)	CLE 7–0
Q1	GB	Pitts 19 yard rush (Hornung kick)	Tie 7–7
Q1	CLE	Brown 1 yard rush (Groza kick)	CLE 14–7
Q3	GB	Taylor 1 yard rush (Horning kick)	Tie 14–14
Q3	GB	Starr 4 yard rush (Hornung kick)	GB 21–14
Q4	GB	Taylor 5 yard rush (Horning kick)	GB 28–14
Q4	CLE	Warfield 19 yard pass from Ryan (Groza kick) (Groza kick)	GB 28–21

=== Week 12: vs. Philadelphia Eagles ===
Cleveland Browns 38, Philadelphia Eagles 24

Team	1	2	3	4	Total
Eagles	3	0	7	14	24
• Browns	7	14	10	7	38

- Date: November 29
- Location: Cleveland Stadium, Cleveland, Ohio
- Game start: 1:30 p.m. EST
- Game attendance: 79,289
- Game weather: 32 °F (0 °C); wind 15 mph; wind chill 22 °F (−6 °C)
- Referee: Jim Pace
- TV announcers (CBS): Jack Whitaker (PHI) (second half) and Ken Coleman (CLE) (first half) (play–by–play), Art Pollard (PHI) (second half) and Warren Lahr (CLE) (first half) (color commentators)

Scoring summary
Q1	CLE	Shoals 0 yard fumble return (Groza kick)	CLE 7–0
Q1	PHI	Baker 14 yard field goal	CLE 7–3
Q2	CLE	Williams 0 yard fumble return (Groza kick)	CLE 14–3
Q2	CLE	Houston 42 yard interception return (Groza kick)	CLE 21–3
Q3	CLE	Groza 37 yard field goal	CLE 24–3
Q3	PHI	Brown 20 yard rush (Baker kick)	CLE 24–10
Q3	CLE	Brewer 24 yard pass from Ryan (Groza kick)	CLE 31–10
Q4	PHI	Goodwin 19 yard pass from Snead (Baker kick)	CLE 31–17
Q4	CLE	Brewer 13 yard pass from Ryan (Groza kick)	CLE 38–17
Q4	PHI	Retzlaff 32 yard pass from Snead (Baker kick)	CLE 38–24

=== Week 13: at St. Louis Cardinals ===
St. Louis Cardinals 28, Cleveland Browns 19

Team	1	2	3	4	Total
Browns	3	3	3	10	19
• Cardinals	0	21	7	0	28

- Date: December 6
- Location: Busch Stadium I, St. Louis, Missouri
- Game start: 2:00 p.m. EST
- Game attendance: 31,585
- Game weather: 18 °F (−8 °C); wind 7.8 mph; wind chill 8 °F (−13 °C)
- TV announcers (CBS): Ken Coleman (CLE) (second half) and Jack Drees (STL) (first half) (play–by–play), Warren Lahr (second half) (CLE) and Bill Fischer (first half) (STL) (color commentators)

Scoring summary
Q1	CLE	Groza 22 yard field goal	CLE 3–0
Q2	STL	Childress 46 yard pass from Johnson (Bakken kick)	STL 7–3
Q2	STL	Johnson 1 yard rush (Bakken kick)	STL 14–3
Q2	STL	Conrad 8 yard pass from Johnson (Bakken kick)	STL 21–3
Q2	CLE	Groza 39 yard field goal	STL 21–6
Q3	CLE	Groza 17 yard field goal	STL 21–9
Q3	STL	Johnson 1 yard rush (Bakken kick)	STL 28–9
Q4	CLE	Groza 36 yard field goal	STL 28–12
Q4	CLE	Green 30 yard pass from Ryan (Groza kick)	STL 28–19

=== Week 14: at New York Giants ===
Cleveland Browns 52, New York Giants 20

Team	1	2	3	4	Total
• Browns	3	21	21	7	52
Giants	0	7	0	13	20

- Date: December 6
- Location: Yankee Stadium (I), Bronx, New York
- Game start: 2:00 p.m. EST
- Game attendance: 63,007
- Game weather: 49 °F (9 °C); wind 6.8 mph
- TV announcers (CBS): Ken Coleman (CLE) (second half) and Chris Schenkel (NY) (first half) (play–by–play), Warren Lahr (CLE) (second half) and Pat Summerall (NY) (first half) (color commentators)

Scoring summary
Q1	CLE	Groza 39 yard field goal	CLE 3–0
Q2	NY	James 7 yard pass from Tittle (Chandler kick)	NY 7–3
Q2	CLE	Ryan 13 yard rush (Groza kick)	CLE 10–7
Q2	CLE	Collins 11 yard pass from Ryan (Groza kick) (Groza kick)	CLE 17–7
Q2	CLE	Green 1 yard pass from Ryan (Groza kick)	CLE 24–7
Q3	CLE	Green 25 yard pass from Ryan (Groza kick)	CLE 31–7
Q3	CLE	Warfield 8 yard pass from Ryan (Groza kick) (Groza kick)	CLE 38–7
Q3	CLE	Brown 8 yard pass from Ryan (Groza kick) (Groza kick)	CLE 45–7
Q4	NY	Thomas 10 yard pass from Wood (Chandler kick)	CLE 45–14
Q4	CLE	Roberts 24 yard pass from Ninowski (Groza kick)	CLE 52–14
Q4	NY	Thomas 1 yard pass from Wood (kick failed)	CLE 52–20

== Playoffs ==
Round	Date	Opponent	Result	Score	Stadium	Attendance	Time (ET)	Network	Local Radio	National Radio	Recap
NFL Championship Game	December 27	Baltimore Colts	W	27–0	Cleveland Stadium	79,544	1:30 PM EST	CBS	WERE–AM	CBS	Recap

Notes:

^{a} All times are EASTERN time.

=== 1964 NFL Championship Game: vs. Baltimore Colts ===
1964 NFL Championship Game: Cleveland Browns 27, Baltimore Colts 0

Team	1	2	3	4	Total
Colts	0	0	0	0	0
• Browns	0	0	17	10	27

- Date: December 27
- Location: Cleveland Stadium, Cleveland, Ohio
- Game start: 1:30 p.m. EST
- Game attendance: 79,554
- Game weather: 34 °F (1 °C); wind 15.2 mph; wind chill 23 °F (−5 °C)
- Referee: Norm Schachter
- TV announcers (CBS): Chuck Thompson (BAL) (second half) and Ken Coleman (CLE) (first half) (play–by–play), Frank Gifford (color commentator)

Scoring summary
Q3	CLE	Groza 43 yard field goal	CLE 3–0
Q3	CLE	Collins 18 yard pass from Ryan (Groza kick) (Groza kick)	CLE 10–0
Q3	CLE	Collins 42 yard pass from Ryan (Groza kick) (Groza kick)	CLE 17–0
Q4	CLE	Groza 10 yard field goal	CLE 20–0
Q4	CLE	Collins 51 yard pass from Ryan (Groza kick) (Groza kick)	CLE 27–0

== Standings ==
NFL Eastern Conference
	W	L	T	PCT	CONF	PF	PA	STK
Cleveland Browns	10	3	1	.769	9–2–1	415	293	W1
St. Louis Cardinals	9	3	2	.750	8–2–2	357	331	W4
Philadelphia Eagles	6	8	0	.429	6–6	312	313	L1
Washington Redskins	6	8	0	.429	5–7	307	305	L2
Dallas Cowboys	5	8	1	.385	4–7–1	250	289	W1
Pittsburgh Steelers	5	9	0	.357	5–7	253	315	L1
New York Giants	2	10	2	.167	2–8–2	241	399	L4

Note: Tie games were not officially counted in the standings until 1972.

== Personnel ==
=== Staff ===
1964 Cleveland Browns staff
Front office: Owner - Art Modell; General manager – Harold Sauerbrei; Head coaches: Head coach – Blanton Collier; Offensive coaches: Offensive line – Fritz Heisler; Offensive backfield and ends – Dub Jones	Defensive coaches: Defensive coordinator – Howard Brinker; Defensive assistant – Nick Skorich; Linebackers – Ed Ulinski; Support staff and coaches: Trainer - Leo Murphy; Equipment manager - Morrie Kono

=== Roster ===
1964 Cleveland Browns roster
Quarterbacks (QB): 11 Jim Ninowski; 13 Frank Ryan; Running backs (RB): 32 Jim Brown; 36 Charley Scales; 44 Leroy Kelly; 48 Ernie Green; Wide receivers (WR): 27 Walter Roberts; 42 Paul Warfield; 85 Clifton McNeil; 86 Gary Collins P; 87 Tom Hutchinson; Tight ends (TE): 83 Johnny Brewer	Offensive linemen (OL): 56 John Morrow C; 60 John Wooten G; 62 Dale Memmelaar G; 66 Gene Hickerson G; 70 John Brown T; 73 Monte Clark T; 75 Roger Shoals T/G; 77 Dick Schafrath T; Defensive linemen (DL): 69 Jim Kanicki DT; 72 Mike Bundra DT; 74 Dick Modzelewski DT; 78 Frank Parker DT; 80 Bill Glass DE; 84 Paul Wiggin DE; 67 Sid Williams DE	Linebackers (LB): 35 Galen Fiss OLB; 38 Stan Sczurek OLB; 50 Vince Costello MLB; 52 Mike Lucci MLB; 64 Ed Bettridge MLB; 82 Jim Houston OLB; Defensive backs (DB): 20 Ross Fichtner FS; 22 Lowell Caylor SS; 23 Larry Benz SS; 24 Bobby Franklin FS; 26 Dave Raimey CB; 30 Bernie Parrish CB; 49 Walter Beach CB; Special teams (ST): 76 Lou Groza K	Reserve: 79 Bob Gain DT (IR); -- Tom Goosby G (IR); Rookies in italics

== Media ==
=== Radio ===
Flagship station	Play-by-play	Color commentator
WERE–AM 1300 (main); WGAR–AM 1220 (backup)	Gib Shanley	Jim Graner

=== Pre season TV ===
Local TV	Play-by-play	Color commentator
WEWS-TV 5	Ken Coleman	Warren Lahr

== Awards and records ==
- Jim Brown, NFL Rushing Leader, (1,446 yards)
- Frank Ryan, NFL Leader, Touchdown Passes, (25)

=== Milestones ===
- Jim Brown, Seventh NFL Rushing Title

== 1965 NFL Pro Bowl (1964 NFL season), January 10, 1965 ==
Pro Bowl

- Jim Brown, FB, NFL Eastern Conference
- Bill Glass, DE, NFL Eastern Conference
- Jim Houston, OLB, NFL Eastern Conference
- Dick Modzelewski, DT, NFL Eastern Conference
- Frank Ryan, QB, NFL Eastern Conference
- Dick Schafrath, T, NFL Eastern Conference
- Paul Warfield, SE, NFL Eastern Conference
- Blanton Collier, NFL Eastern Conference head coach
- Howard Brinker, NFL Eastern Conference defensive coordinator
- Fritz Heisler, NFL Eastern Conference offensive line coach
- Dub Jones, NFL Eastern Conference offensive backfield and ends coach
- Nick Skorich, NFL Eastern Conference defensive assistant coach
- Ed Ulinski, NFL Eastern Conference linebackers coach
