= 1964 Dallas Cowboys season =

NFL team season

- Owner: Clint Murchison, Jr.
- General manager: Tex Schramm
- Head coach: Tom Landry
- Home stadium: Cotton Bowl

Results
- Record: 5–8–1
- Division place: 5th NFL Eastern
- Playoffs: Did not qualify

The 1964 NFL season was the Dallas Cowboys' fifth season in the league. The team improved on their previous output of 4–10, winning five games. They failed to qualify for the playoffs for the fifth consecutive season. The Cowboys would not have another losing season until 1986.

This season would also start an annual tradition, which the Cowboys would wear white jerseys at home, a tradition they have maintained every year since.

== Offseason ==
=== NFL draft ===
1964 Dallas Cowboys draft
Round	Pick	Player	Position	College	Notes
1	4	Scott Appleton	DT	Texas	He was immediately traded to the Pittsburgh Steelers
2	17	Mel Renfro * ^{†}	CB	Oregon	
4	43	Perry Lee Dunn	RB	Ole Miss	
6	73	Billy Lothridge	QB	Georgia Tech	
6	82	Jim Curry	End	Cincinnati	
6	83	Jim Evans	End	Texas Western	
7	88	Bob Hayes * ^{†}	WR	Florida A&M	
8	101	Al Geverink	RB	UCLA	
9	116	Jake Kupp *	OG	Washington	
10	129	Roger Staubach * ^{†}	QB	Navy	
11	144	Bob Crenshaw	OG	Baylor	
12	157	Johnny Norman	End	Northwestern State (LA)	
13	172	Jerry Rhome	QB	Tulsa	
14	185	Jim Worden	LB	Wittenberg	
15	200	Bill Van Burkleo	RB	Tulsa	
16	213	Paul Cercel	C	Pittsburgh	
17	228	Bud Abell	LB	Missouri	
18	241	Theo Viltz	DB	USC	He signed with the Houston Oilers of the AFL
19	256	H.D. Murphy	RB	Oregon	
20	269	John Hughes	LB	SMU	
Made roster † Pro Football Hall of Fame * Made at least one Pro Bowl during career

== Schedule ==
Week	Date	Opponent	Result	Record	Game Site	Attendance	Recap
1	September 12	**St. Louis Cardinals**	**L** 6–16	0–1	Cotton Bowl	36,605	Recap
2	September 20	**Washington Redskins**	**W** 24–18	1–1	Cotton Bowl	25,158	Recap
3	September 27	at **Pittsburgh Steelers**	**L** 17–23	1–2	Pitt Stadium	35,594	Recap
4	October 4	at **Cleveland Browns**	**L** 6–27	1–3	Cleveland Stadium	72,062	Recap
5	October 11	**New York Giants**	**T** 13–13	1–3–1	Cotton Bowl	33,324	Recap
6	October 18	**Cleveland Browns**	**L** 16–20	1–4–1	Cotton Bowl	37,456	Recap
7	October 25	at **St. Louis Cardinals**	**W** 31–13	2–4–1	Busch Stadium	28,253	Recap
8	November 1	at Chicago Bears	**W** 24–10	3–4–1	Wrigley Field	47,527	Recap
9	November 8	at **New York Giants**	**W** 31–21	4–4–1	Yankee Stadium	63,061	Recap
10	November 15	**Philadelphia Eagles**	**L** 14–17	4–5–1	Cotton Bowl	55,972	Recap
11	November 22	at **Washington Redskins**	**L** 16–28	4–6–1	D.C. Stadium	49,219	Recap
12	November 29	Green Bay Packers	**L** 21–45	4–7–1	Cotton Bowl	44,975	Recap
13	December 6	at **Philadelphia Eagles**	**L** 14–24	4–8–1	Franklin Field	60,671	Recap
14	December 13	**Pittsburgh Steelers**	**W** 17–14	5–8–1	Cotton Bowl	35,271	Recap

Conference opponents are in bold text

== Game summaries ==
=== Week 4: at Cleveland Browns ===
Cleveland Browns 27, Dallas Cowboys 6

Quarter	1	2	3	4	Total
Cowboys	0	6	0	0	6
Browns	7	6	7	7	27

at Cleveland Municipal Stadium, Cleveland, Ohio

- Date: October 4
- Game time: 12:30 p.m. CDT
- Game weather: 56 °F (13 °C), relative humidity 58%, wind 13 mph
- Game attendance: 72,062
- TV announcers (CBS): Frank Glieber (DAL) (second half) and Ken Coleman (CLE) (first half) (play-by-play), Ray Renfro (DAL) (second half) and Warren Lahr (CLE) (first half) (color commentators)
- Pro-Football-Reference.com

Game information

First Quarter

- CLE – Ernie Green 7 yard pass from Frank Ryan Browns 7-0

Second Quarter

- CLE – Lou Groza 19 yard field goal – Browns 10-0
- DAL – Pettis Norman 5 yard pass from John Roach – (kick failed) Browns 10-6
- CLE – Lou Groza 21 yard field goal – Browns 13-6

Third Quarter

- CLE – Paul Warfield 40 yard pass from Frank Ryan – (Lou Groza kick) Browns 20-6

Fourth Quarter

- CLE – Gary Collins 38 yard pass from Frank Ryan Browns 27-6

Cowboys

Browns

=== Week 6: vs. Cleveland Browns ===
Cleveland Browns 20, Dallas Cowboys 16

Quarter	1	2	3	4	Total
Browns	7	6	0	7	20
Cowboys	0	6	10	0	16

at Cotton Bowl, Dallas, Texas

- Date: October 18
- Game time: 1:30 p.m. CDT
- Game weather: 68 °F (20 °C), relative humidity 60%, wind 16 mph
- Game attendance: 37,456
- TV announcers (CBS): Ken Coleman (CLE) (second half) and Frank Glieber (DAL) (first half) (play-by-play), Warren Lahr (CLE) (second half) and Ray Renfro (DAL) (first half) (color commentators)
- Pro-Football-Reference.com

Game information

First Quarter

- CLE – Ernie Green 1 yard run – (Lou Groza kick) Browns 7-0

Second Quarter

- DAL – Dick Van Raaphorst 34 yard field goal – Browns 7-3
- CLE – Lou Groza 34 yard field goal – Browns 10-3
- CLE – Lou Groza 30 yard field goal – Browns 13-3
- DAL – Dick Van Raaphorst 20 yard field goal – Browns 13-6

Third Quarter

- DAL – Dick Van Raaphorst 37 yard field goal – Browns 13-9
- DAL – Don Perkins 1 yard run – (Dick Van Raaphorst kick) Cowboys 16-13

Fourth Quarter

- CLE – Bernie Parrish 54 yard interception return – (Lou Groza kick) Browns 20-16

Browns

Cowboys

== Standings ==
NFL Eastern Conference
	W	L	T	PCT	CONF	PF	PA	STK
Cleveland Browns	10	3	1	.769	9–2–1	415	293	W1
St. Louis Cardinals	9	3	2	.750	8–2–2	357	331	W4
Philadelphia Eagles	6	8	0	.429	6–6	312	313	L1
Washington Redskins	6	8	0	.429	5–7	307	305	L2
Dallas Cowboys	5	8	1	.385	4–7–1	250	289	W1
Pittsburgh Steelers	5	9	0	.357	5–7	253	315	L1
New York Giants	2	10	2	.167	2–8–2	241	399	L4

Note: Tie games were not officially counted in the standings until 1972.

== Season recap ==
With one year left on his original contract, Tom Landry is re-signed to an additional 10-year extension, in effect giving him an 11-year deal, the longest in major pro sports history in the United States.

== Roster ==
Dallas Cowboys 1964 roster
Quarterbacks: 17 Don Meredith; 12 John Roach; Running backs: 37 Perry Lee Dunn; 31 Amos Marsh; 43 Don Perkins; 40 Jim Stiger; Wide receivers: 82 Frank Clarke; 26 Buddy Dial; 35 Pete Gent; 25 Tommy McDonald; Tight ends: 80 Lee Folkins; 84 Pettis Norman	Offensive linemen: 68 Jim Boeke T; 53 Mike Connelly C; 76 Bill Frank T/G; 75 Bob Fry T; 60 Joe Isbell G; 67 Jake Kupp G; 72 Tony Liscio T; 51 Dave Manders G/C; 65 Ray Schoenke T/G; 64 Jim Ray Smith G; Defensive linemen: 66 George Andrie DE; 77 Jim Colvin DT; 74 Bob Lilly DT; 79 Larry Stephens DE; 78 Maury Youmans DE/DT	Linebackers: 52 Dave Edwards OLB; 56 Harold Hays MLB/OLB; 54 Chuck Howley OLB; 55 Lee Roy Jordan OLB; 50 Jerry Tubbs MLB; Defensive backs: 44 Don Bishop CB; 27 Mike Gaechter SS; 34 Cornell Green CB; 41 Warren Livingston CB; 20 Mel Renfro FS; 42 Jimmy Ridlon SS; Special teams: 18 Billy Lothridge P/QB; 30 Dick Van Raaphorst K	Reserve lists: 22 Amos Bullocks RB (IR); 20 Jerry Overton CB (IR); 71 Don Talbert T (Military); Rookies in italics 40 active, 3 inactive
