= 1964 St. Louis Cardinals (NFL) season =

American football team season

1964 St. Louis Cardinals season
- Head coach: Wally Lemm
- Home stadium: Busch Stadium (I)

Results
- Record: 9–3–2
- Division place: 2nd NFL Eastern
- Playoffs: Won NFL Playoff Bowl (vs. Packers) 24–17

The 1964 St. Louis Cardinals season was the team's 45th year with the National Football League (NFL) and the fifth season in St. Louis.

The Cardinals (9–3–2) were the runner-up in the Eastern Conference, finishing a half game behind the Cleveland Browns (10–3–1), who won the NFL championship game on December 27. The Cardinals tied the Browns in Cleveland in September and defeated them in St. Louis in December.

As the conference runner-up, the Cardinals played the Green Bay Packers of the Western Conference in the third place Playoff Bowl in Miami, Florida. Held on January 3 at the Orange Bowl, St. Louis won in an upset, 24–17. It was the Cardinals' only postseason appearance between 1948 and 1974.

== Regular season ==
=== Schedule ===
Week	Date	Opponent	Result	Record	Venue	Attendance
1	September 12	at **Dallas Cowboys**	**W** 16–6	1–0	Cotton Bowl	36,605
2	September 20	at **Cleveland Browns**	**T** 33–33	1–0–1	Cleveland Municipal Stadium	76,954
3	September 27	at San Francisco 49ers	**W** 23–13	2–0–1	Kezar Stadium	30,969
4	October 4	at **Washington Redskins**	**W** 23–17	3–0–1	D.C. Stadium	49,219
5	October 12	at Baltimore Colts^	**L** 27–47	3–1–1	Memorial Stadium	60,213
6	October 18	**Washington Redskins**	**W** 38–24	4–1–1	Busch Stadium	23,748
7	October 25	**Dallas Cowboys**	**L** 13–31	4–2–1	Busch Stadium	28,253
8	November 1	at **New York Giants**	**L** 17–34	4–3–1	Yankee Stadium	63,072
9	November 8	**Pittsburgh Steelers**	**W** 34–30	5–3–1	Busch Stadium	28,245
10	November 15	**New York Giants**	**T** 10–10	5–3–2	Busch Stadium	29,608
11	November 22	at **Philadelphia Eagles**	**W** 38–13	6–3–2	Franklin Field	60,671
12	November 29	at **Pittsburgh Steelers**	**W** 21–20	7–3–2	Pitt Stadium	27,807
13	December 6	**Cleveland Browns**	**W** 28–19	8–3–2	Busch Stadium	31,585
14	December 13	**Philadelphia Eagles**	**W** 36–34	9–3–2	Busch Stadium	24,636
Note: Intra-conference opponents are in **bold** text.

^ The game with the Baltimore Colts on October 12 was originally scheduled for St. Louis,
but was moved to Baltimore due to the baseball Cardinals' participation in the World Series.

=== Game summaries ===
==== Week 2: at Cleveland Browns ====
St. Louis Cardinals 33, Cleveland Browns 33

Quarter	1	2	3	4	Total
Cardinals	10	3	10	10	**33**
Browns	6	10	7	10	**33**

at Cleveland Municipal Stadium, Cleveland, Ohio

- Date: September 20
- Game time: 12:30 p.m. CDT
- Game weather: 67 °F (19 °C), relative humidity 87%, wind 7 mph (11 km/h)
- Game attendance: 76,954
- Referee: Tom Bell
- TV announcers (CBS): Jack Drees (STL) (second half) and Ken Coleman (CLE) (first half) (play-by-play), Bill Fischer (STL) (second half) and Warren Lahr (CLE) (first half) (color commentators)
- Pro-Football-Reference.com

Game information

First Quarter

- STL - John David Crow 22 yard pass from Charley Johnson - (Jim Bakken kick) **Cardinals 7-0**
- CLE - Lou Groza 32 yard field goal - **Cardinals 7-3**
- CLE - Lou Groza 12 yard field goal - **Cardinals 7-6**
- STL - Jim Bakken 30 yard field goal - **Cardinals 10-6**

Second Quarter

- CLE - Lou Groza 37 yard field goal - **Cardinals 10-9**
- STL - Jim Bakken 51 yard field goal - **Cardinals 13-9**
- CLE - Paul Warfield 40 yard pass from Frank Ryan - (Lou Groza kick) **Browns 16-13**

Third Quarter

- STL - Sonny Randle 38 yard pass from Charley Johnson - (Jim Bakken kick) **Cardinals 20-16**
- STL - Jim Bakken 44 yard field goal - **Cardinals 23-16**
- CLE - Gary Collins 7 yard pass from Frank Ryan - (Lou Groza kick) **Tied 23-23**

Fourth Quarter

- STL - Sonny Randle 50 yard pass from Charley Johnson - (Jim Bakken kick)**Cardinals 30-23**
- CLE - Lou Groza 25 yard field goal - **Cardinals 30-26**
- CLE - Jim Brown 1 yard rush - (Lou Groza kick) **Browns 33-30**
- STL - Jim Bakken 28 yard field goal - **Tied 33-33**

Cardinals

Browns

==== Week 13: vs. Cleveland Browns ====
St. Louis Cardinals 28, Cleveland Browns 19

Quarter	1	2	3	4	Total
Browns	3	3	3	10	**19**
**Cardinals**	0	21	7	0	**28**

at Busch Stadium I, St. Louis, Missouri

- Date: December 6
- Game time: 1:00 p.m. CST
- Game weather: 18 °F (−8 °C), relative humidity 98%, wind 7.8 mph (13 km/h), wind chill 8 °F (−13 °C)
- Game attendance: 31,585
- TV announcers (CBS): Ken Coleman (CLE) (second half) and Jack Drees (STL) (first half) (play-by-play), Warren Lahr (CLE) (second half) and Bill Fischer (STL) (first half) (color commentators)
- Pro-Football-Reference.com

Game information

First Quarter

- CLE - Lou Groza 22 yard field goal - **Browns 3-0**

Second Quarter

- STL - Joe Childress 46 yard pass from Charley Johnson - (Jim Bakken kick) **Cardinals 7-3**
- STL - Charley Johnson 1 yard run - (Jim Bakken kick) **Cardinals 14-3**
- STL - Bobby Joe Conrad 8 yard pass from Charley Johnson - (Jim Bakken kick) **Cardinals 21-3**
- CLE - Lou Groza 39 yard field goal - **Cardinals 21-6**

Third Quarter

- CLE - Lou Groza 17 yard field goal - **Cardinals 21-9**
- STL - Charley Johnson 1 yard run - (Jim Bakken kick) **Cardinals 28-9**

Fourth Quarter

- CLE - Lou Groza 36 yard field goal - **Cardinals 28-12**
- CLE - Ernie Green 30 yard pass from Frank Ryan - (Lou Groza kick) **Cardinals 28-19**

Browns

Cardinals

== Standings ==
NFL Eastern Conference
	W	L	T	PCT	CONF	PF	PA	STK
Cleveland Browns	10	3	1	.769	9–2–1	415	293	W1
St. Louis Cardinals	9	3	2	.750	8–2–2	357	331	W4
Philadelphia Eagles	6	8	0	.429	6–6	312	313	L1
Washington Redskins	6	8	0	.429	5–7	307	305	L2
Dallas Cowboys	5	8	1	.385	4–7–1	250	289	W1
Pittsburgh Steelers	5	9	0	.357	5–7	253	315	L1
New York Giants	2	10	2	.167	2–8–2	241	399	L4

Note: Tie games were not officially counted in the standings until 1972.

== Personnel ==
=== Staff / Coaches ===
1964 St. Louis Cardinals staff
Front office: Principal Owner/de facto General Manager - Bill Bidwill; Partial Owner / Team President - Charles Bidwill Jr.; Head coaches: Head Coach – Wally Lemm; Offensive coaches: Offensive Backs / Game Scouting - Charley Trippi; Offensive line – Ray Prochaska; Receivers Coach – Fran Polsfoot	Defensive coaches: Defensive Coordinator - Chuck Drulis; Defensive Backs Coach - Walt Schlinkman

=== Roster ===
1964 St. Louis Cardinals roster
Quarterbacks (QB): 11 Buddy Humphrey; 12 Charley Johnson; Running backs (RB): 35 Joe Childress; 33 Willis Crenshaw; 44 John David Crow; 22 Prentice Gautt; 23 Bob Paremore; 36 Bill Thornton; Wide receivers (WR): 40 Bobby Joe Conrad; 3 Billy Gambrell; Tight ends (TE): 85 Taz Anderson; 81 Jackie Smith	Offensive linemen (OL): 75 Ed Cook G/T; 61 Bob DeMarco C; 55 Irv Goode G/C; 64 Ken Gray G; 73 Ernie McMillan T; 71 Bob Reynolds T; 66 Rick Sortun G; 63 Herschel Turner T/G; Defensive linemen (DL): 86 Don Brumm DE; 74 Ken Kortas DT/DE; 78 Luke Owens DT; 65 Tom Redmond DE; 84 Joe Robb DE; 72 Sam Silas DT; 79 Chuck Walker DE/DT	Linebackers (LB): 33 Mal Hammack OLB; 34 Bill Koman OLB; 60 Dave Meggyesy MLB; 62 Dale Meinert MLB; 52 Marion Rushing OLB; 67 Larry Stallings OLB; Defensive backs (DB): 20 Monk Bailey CB/S; 49 Jimmy Burson CB; 37 Pat Fischer CB; 41 Jimmy Hill CB; 21 Jerry Stovall SS/P; 8 Larry Wilson FS; Special teams (ST): 25 Jim Bakken K	Reserve: 88 Sonny Randle WR (IR); 38 Bill Triplett RB (NF-Ill.); Rookies in italics

== Postseason ==
=== Playoff Bowl ===
Round	Date	Opponent	Result	Venue	Attendance
Playoff Bowl	January 3, 1965	Green Bay Packers	W 24–17	Orange Bowl	56,218
