= 1964 Pittsburgh Steelers season =

Steelers 32nd US football season

- Owner: Art Rooney
- Head coach: Buddy Parker
- Home stadium: Pitt Stadium

Results
- Record: 5–9
- Division place: 5th NFL Eastern
- Playoffs: Did not qualify

The 1964 Pittsburgh Steelers season was the team's 32nd in the National Football League.

The team played all of their home games at Pitt Stadium, and won five games, while losing nine, resulting in a fifth-place finish in the NFL Eastern Conference. Following the season, the Steelers dismissed head coach Buddy Parker and replaced him with Mike Nixon.

During the September 20 game against the Giants at Pitt Stadium, Pittsburgh Post-Gazette photographer Morris Bowman snapped a photograph of Giants quarterback Y.A. Tittle, in his 17th and final season, kneeling, his helmet off and his forehead bloody. It happened after defensive tackle John Baker hit him, leading to an interception by rookie Chuck Hinton, which was returned for a touchdown. The Steelers, who had been down 14-0 at the time, rallied, scoring 20 unanswered points and winning the game 27-24 over the Giants, who were led by backup quarterback Gary Wood for the remainder of the game. The photograph now hangs in the Pro Football Hall of Fame in Canton, Ohio.

== Roster ==
1964 Pittsburgh Steelers roster
Quarterbacks (QB): 15 Ed Brown P; 14 Bill Nelsen; 12 Terry Nofsinger; 16 Tommy Wade; Running backs (RB): 42 Dick Hoak; 35 John Henry Johnson; 46 Phil King; 36 Clarence Peaks; 33 Theron Sapp; Wide receivers (WR): 85 Gary Ballman; 86 John Burrell; 20 Paul Martha; 28 Clendon Thomas SS; Tight ends (TE): 82 Chuck Logan; 88 John Powers	Offensive linemen (OL): 71 Charlie Bradshaw T; 77 Dan James T; 72 Ray Lemek G; 51 Buzz Nutter C; 68 Ron Stehouwer G; Defensive linemen (DL): 78 John Baker DE; 64 Chuck Hinton DT; 74 Urban Henry DT; 75 Joe Krupa DT; 87 Dan LaRose DE; 73 Ray Mansfield DT; 60 Ben McGee DE	Linebackers (LB): 30 Bob Harrison OLB; 31 Ed Holler OLB/P; 54 Max Messner OLB; 66 Myron Pottios MLB; 50 Bill Saul OLB; 67 Bob Schmitz OLB; 34 Bob Soleau MLB; Defensive backs (DB): 21 Jim Bradshaw SS; 44 Willie Daniel CB; 27 Dick Haley FS; 26 Brady Keys CB; 49 Bob Sherman FS; Special teams (ST): 83 Mike Clark K	Reserve: 89 Jim Kelly TE (IR); -- Andy Russell LB (Military); 62 Mike Sandusky G (IR); 47 Marv Woodson CB (IR); Rookies in italics

== Regular season ==
=== Schedule ===
Week	Date	Opponent	Result	Record	Venue
1	September 13	Los Angeles Rams	**L** 14–26	0–1	Pitt Stadium
2	September 20	**New York Giants**	**W** 27–24	1–1	Pitt Stadium
3	September 27	**Dallas Cowboys**	**W** 23–17	2–1	Pitt Stadium
4	October 4	at **Philadelphia Eagles**	**L** 7–21	2–2	Franklin Field
5	October 10	at **Cleveland Browns**	**W** 23–7	3–2	Cleveland Municipal Stadium
6	October 18	at Minnesota Vikings	**L** 10–30	3–3	Metropolitan Stadium
7	October 25	**Philadelphia Eagles**	**L** 10–34	3–4	Pitt Stadium
8	November 1	**Cleveland Browns**	**L** 17–30	3–5	Pitt Stadium
9	November 8	at **St. Louis Cardinals**	**L** 30–34	3–6	Busch Stadium
10	November 15	**Washington Redskins**	**L** 0–30	3–7	Pitt Stadium
11	November 22	at **New York Giants**	**W** 44–17	4–7	Yankee Stadium
12	November 29	**St. Louis Cardinals**	**L** 20–21	4–8	Pitt Stadium
13	December 6	at **Washington Redskins**	**W** 14–7	5–8	D.C. Stadium
14	December 13	at **Dallas Cowboys**	**L** 14–17	5–9	Cotton Bowl
Note: Intra-conference opponents are in **bold** text.

=== Game summaries ===
==== Week 1 (Sunday September 13, 1964): Los Angeles Rams ====
	1	2	3	4	Total
**Rams**	0	13	13	0	**26**
Steelers	0	7	0	7	**14**

at Pitt Stadium, Pittsburgh, Pennsylvania

- Game time:
- Game weather:
- Game attendance: 33,988
- Referee:
- TV announcers:

Scoring drives:

- Los Angeles – FG Gossett 9 0–3
- Los Angeles – FG Gossett 39 0–6
- Los Angeles – Wilson 1 run (Gossett kick)0–13
- Pittsburgh – Ballman 25 pass from Brown (Clark kick)7–13
- Los Angeles – Allen 10 pass from Munson (kick failed)7–19
- Los Angeles – Lundy 14 interception return (Gossett kick)7–26
- Pittsburgh – King 4 run (Clark kick)14–26

==== Week 2 (Sunday September 20, 1964): New York Giants ====
	1	2	3	4	Total
Giants	14	0	7	3	**24**
**Steelers**	0	13	7	7	**27**

at Pitt Stadium, Pittsburgh, Pennsylvania

- Game time:
- Game weather:
- Game attendance: 33,053
- Referee:
- TV announcers:

Scoring drives:

- New York Giants – Barnes 26 interception (Chandler kick)0–7
- New York Giants – Webster 2 run (Chandler kick)0–14
- Pittsburgh – Hinton 8 interception return (kick failed)6–14
- Pittsburgh – Johnson 2 pass from Brown (Clark kick)13–14
- Pittsburgh – Brown 2 run (Chandler kick)20–14
- New York Giants – James 2 run (Chandler kick)20–21
- Pittsburgh – Brown 1 run (Clark kick)27–21
- New York Giants – FG Chandler 22 27–24

==== Week 3 (Sunday September 26, 1964): Dallas Cowboys ====
	1	2	3	4	Total
Cowboys	3	7	0	0	**10**
**Steelers**	3	6	14	0	**23**

at Pitt Stadium, Pittsburgh, Pennsylvania

- Game time:
- Game weather:
- Game attendance: 33,594
- Referee:
- TV announcers:

Scoring drives:

- Pittsburgh – FG Clark 3–0
- Dallas – FG Van Raaphorst 16 3–3
- Pittsburgh – Ballman 32 pass from Brown (kick failed)9–3
- Dallas – Clarke 7 pass from Meredith (Van Raaphorst kick)9–10
- Pittsburgh – Kelly 21 pass from Brown (Clark kick)16–10
- Pittsburgh – King 4 pass from Brown (Clark kick)23–10

==== Week 4 (Sunday October 4, 1964): Philadelphia Eagles ====
	1	2	3	4	Total
Steelers	0	0	0	7	**7**
**Eagles**	7	7	0	7	**21**

at Franklin Field, Philadelphia

- Game time:
- Game weather:
- Game attendance: 59,394
- Referee: Bud Brubaker
- TV announcers:

Scoring drives:

- Philadelphia – T. Brown 23 pass from Snead (Baker kick)0–7
- Philadelphia – T. Brown 87 pass from Snead (Baker kick)0–14
- Philadelphia – Retzlaff 31 pass from Snead (Baker kick)0–21
- Pittsburgh – J. Bradshaw 33 run with recovered fumble (Clark kick)7–21

==== Week 5 (Saturday October 10, 1964): at Cleveland Browns ====
Pittsburgh Steelers 23, Cleveland Browns 7

Quarter	1	2	3	4	Total
**Steelers**	10	6	7	0	**23**
Browns	0	7	0	0	**7**

at Cleveland Municipal Stadium, Cleveland, Ohio

- Date: October 10
- Game time: 8:00 p.m. EDT
- Game weather: 40 °F (4 °C), relative humidity 69%, wind 14 mph
- Game attendance: 80,530
- TV announcers (Sports Network Incorporated (SNI)): Ken Coleman (play-by-play), Warren Lahr (color commentator)
- Pro-Football-Reference.com

Game information

First Quarter

- PIT – Mike Clark 21 yard field goal – **Steelers 3-0**
- PIT – John Henry Johnson 33 yard rush – (Mike Clark kick) – **Steelers 10-0**

Second Quarter

- PIT – John Henry Johnson 45 yard rush – (kick failed) – **Steelers 16-0**
- CLE – Gary Collins 18 yard pass from Frank Ryan – (Lou Groza kick) **Steelers 16-7**

Third Quarter

- PIT – John Henry Johnson 5 yard rush – (Mike Clark kick) – **Steelers 23-7**

Steelers

Browns

==== Week 6 (Sunday October 18, 1964): Minnesota Vikings ====
	1	2	3	4	Total
Steelers	3	7	0	0	**10**
**Vikings**	6	7	7	10	**30**

at Metropolitan Stadium, Bloomington, Minnesota

- Game time:
- Game weather:
- Game attendance: 39,873
- Referee:
- TV announcers:

Scoring Drives:

- Pittsburgh – FG Clark 12 3–0
- Minnesota – Brown 6 pass from Tarkenton (kick failed)6–3
- Pittsburgh – Hoak 17 pass from Brown (Clark kick)10–6
- Minnesota – Brown 59 pass from Tarkenton (Cox kick)10–13
- Minnesota – Brown 1 run (Cox kick)10–20
- Minnesota – FG Cox 25 10–23
- Minnesota – Hawkins 56 interception return (Cox kick)10–30

==== Week 7 (Sunday October 25, 1964): Philadelphia Eagles ====
	1	2	3	4	Total
**Eagles**	7	10	3	14	**34**
Steelers	7	0	3	0	**10**

at Pitt Stadium, Pittsburgh, Pennsylvania

- Game time:
- Game weather:
- Game attendance: 38,393
- Referee: George Rennix
- TV announcers:

Scoring drives:

- Philadelphia – Concannon 15 run (Baker kick)0–7
- Pittsburgh – Peaks 70 run (Clark kick)7–7
- Philadelphia – Mack 53 pass from Snead (Baker kick)7–14
- Philadelphia – FG Baker 14 7–17
- Pittsburgh – FG Clark 13 10–17
- Philadelphia – FG Baker 47 10–20
- Philadelphia – Snead 1 run (Baker kick) 10–27
- Philadelphia – Cross 94 interception return (Baker kick)10–34

==== Week 8 (Sunday November 1, 1964): vs. Cleveland Browns ====
Cleveland Browns 30, Pittsburgh Steelers 17

Quarter	1	2	3	4	Total
**Browns**	0	10	10	10	**30**
Steelers	0	10	0	7	**17**

at Pitt Stadium, Pittsburgh, Pennsylvania

- Date: November 1
- Game time: 1:30 p.m. EST
- Game weather: 51 °F (11 °C), relative humidity 51%, wind 6 mph
- Game attendance: 49,568
- TV announcers (CBS): Ken Coleman (CLE) (second half) and Joe Tucker (PIT) (first half) (play-by-play), Warren Lahr (CLE) (second half) and Johnny Sauer (PIT) (first half) (color commentators)
- Pro-Football-Reference.com

Game information

Second Quarter

- CLE – Lou Groza 36 yard field goal – **Browns 3-0**
- CLE – Clifton McNeil 25 yard pass from Frank Ryan – (Lou Groza kick) **Browns 10-0**
- PIT – Clarence Peaks 5 yard rush – (Mike Clark kick) **Browns 10-7**
- PIT – Mike Clark 26 yard field goal – **Tied 10-10**

Third Quarter

- CLE – Ernie Green 7 yard rush – (Lou Groza kick) **Browns 17-10**
- CLE – Lou Groza 22 yard field goal – **Browns 20-10**

Fourth Quarter

- CLE – Lou Groza 16 yard field goal – **Browns 23-17**
- PIT – John Henry Johnson 1 yard rush – (Mike Clark kick) **Browns 23-17**
- CLE – Ernie Green 13 yard rush – (Lou Groza kick) **Browns 30-17**

Browns

Steelers

==== Week 9 (Sunday November 8, 1964): St. Louis Cardinals ====
	1	2	3	4	Total
Steelers	3	10	3	14	**30**
**Cardinals**	3	10	7	14	**34**

at Busch Stadium, St. Louis, Missouri

- Game time:
- Game weather:
- Game attendance: 28,245
- Referee:
- TV announcers:

Scoring drives:

- St. Louis – FG Bakken 12 0–3
- Pittsburgh – FG Clark 19 3–3
- St. Louis – Gautt 2 run (Bakken kick)3–10
- Pittsburgh – FG Clark 43 6–10
- St. Louis – FG Bakken 16 6–13
- Pittsburgh – Ballman 28 pass from Brown13–13
- Pittsburgh – FG Clark 38 16–13
- St. Louis – Conrad 2 pass from Johnson (Bakken kick)16–20
- St. Louis – Gambrell 8 pass from Johnson (Bakken kick)16–27
- St. Louis – Meinert 18 interception return (Bakken kick)16–34
- Pittsburgh – Hoak 22 pass from Nelsen (Clark kick)23–34
- Pittsburgh – Ballman 29 pass from Nelsen (Clark kick)30–34

==== Week 10 (Sunday November 15, 1964): Washington Redskins ====
	1	2	3	4	Total
**Redskins**	7	13	10	0	**30**
Steelers	0	0	0	0	**0**

at Pitt Stadium, Pittsburgh, Pennsylvania

- Game time:
- Game weather:
- Game attendance: 31,587
- Referee:
- TV announcers:

Scoring drives:

- Washington – Taylor 3 run (Martin kick)0–7
- Washington – Coia 80 pass from Jurgensen (kick failed)0–13
- Washington – Taylor 80 pass from Jurgensen (Martin kick)0–20
- Washington – Sample 15 interception (Martin kick)0–27
- Washington – FG Martin 31 0–30

==== Week 11 (Sunday November 22, 1964): New York Giants ====
	1	2	3	4	Total
**Steelers**	3	14	20	7	**44**
Giants	0	3	0	14	**17**

at Yankee Stadium, The Bronx, New York

- Game time:
- Game weather:
- Game attendance: 62,691
- Referee:
- TV announcers:

Scoring drives:

- Pittsburgh – FG Clark 10 3–0
- Pittsburgh – Thomas 13 pass from Brown (Clark kick)10–0
- Pittsburgh – Johnson 10 run (Clark kick)17–0
- New York Giants FG Chandler 22 yd FG17–3
- Pittsburgh – Ballman 22 pass from Brown (Clark kick)24–3
- Pittsburgh – FG Clark 28 27–3
- Pittsburgh – Johnson 2 run (Clark kick)34–3
- Pittsburgh – FG Clark 23 37–3
- New York Giants – Wood 8 run (Chandler kick)37–10
- Pittsburgh – Hoak 5 run (Clark kick)44–10
- New York Giants – Barnes recovered fumble in end zone (Chandler kick)44–17

==== Week 12 (Sunday November 29, 1964): St. Louis Cardinals ====
	1	2	3	4	Total
**Cardinals**	7	0	0	14	**21**
Steelers	0	3	7	10	**20**

at Pitt Stadium, Pittsburgh, Pennsylvania

- Game time:
- Game weather:
- Game attendance: 27,807
- Referee:
- TV announcers:

Scoring drives:

- St. Louis – Crow 5 run (Bakken kick)0–7
- Pittsburgh – FG Clark 30 3–7
- Pittsburgh – J. Bradshaw 47 fumble return (Clark kick)10–7
- Pittsburgh – Hoak 3 run (Clark kick) 17–7
- Pittsburgh – FG Clark 36 20–7
- St. Louis – Smith 42 pass from Johnson (Bakken kick)20–14
- St. Louis – Fischer 49 fumble return (Bakken kick)20–21

The loss ended the Steelers' 13-game home winning streak against the Cardinals and marked their first home defeat to the Cardinals since the 1948 season.

==== Week 13 (Sunday December 6, 1964): Washington Redskins ====
	1	2	3	4	Total
**Steelers**	7	0	0	7	**14**
Redskins	0	7	0	0	**7**

at D.C. Stadium, Washington, D.C.

- Game time:
- Game weather:
- Game attendance: 42,219
- Referee:
- TV announcers:

Scoring drives:

- Pittsburgh – Johnson 4 run (Clark kick)7–0
- Washington – Taylor 36 run (Martin kick)7–7
- Pittsburgh – Ballman 47 pass from Brown (Clark kick)14–7

==== Week 14 (December 13, 1964): Dallas Cowboys ====
	1	2	3	4	Total
Steelers	0	0	7	7	**14**
**Cowboys**	10	0	0	7	**17**

at Cotton Bowl, Dallas, Texas

- Game time:
- Game weather:
- Game attendance: 35,271
- Referee:
- TV announcers:

Scoring drives:

- Dallas – FG Van Raaphorst 10 0–3
- Dallas – Norman 8 pass from Meredith (Van Raaphorst kick)0–10
- Pittsburgh – Hoak 3 pass from Brown (Clark kick)7–10
- Dallas – Dunn 3 run (Van Raaphorst kick)7–17
- Pittsburgh – Ballman 36 pass from Brown (Clark kick)14–17

== Standings ==
NFL Eastern Conference
	W	L	T	PCT	CONF	PF	PA	STK
Cleveland Browns	10	3	1	.769	9–2–1	415	293	W1
St. Louis Cardinals	9	3	2	.750	8–2–2	357	331	W4
Philadelphia Eagles	6	8	0	.429	6–6	312	313	L1
Washington Redskins	6	8	0	.429	5–7	307	305	L2
Dallas Cowboys	5	8	1	.385	4–7–1	250	289	W1
Pittsburgh Steelers	5	9	0	.357	5–7	253	315	L1
New York Giants	2	10	2	.167	2–8–2	241	399	L4

Note: Tie games were not officially counted in the standings until 1972.
