= 1964 New York Giants season =

NFL team season

- Owner: Jack Mara; Wellington Mara
- Head coach: Allie Sherman
- Home stadium: Yankee Stadium

Results
- Record: 2–10–2
- Division place: 7th NFL Eastern
- Playoffs: Did not qualify

The 1964 New York Giants season was the franchise's 40th season in the National Football League. The resulting record of 2–10–2, was the worst record in the league that year, after being Eastern Conference Champions just a year prior. This was the team's first losing season since 1953.

== Offseason ==
=== Offseason trades and signings ===
The New York Giants decided to trade their star defensive player, Sam Huff, a middle linebacker, to the Washington Redskins. They received young players, being defensive end Andy Stynchula and halfback Dick James, in return. This trade had easily become one of the most controversial and shocking trades in Giants history. The two young players had brought youth but made little impact to the team.

=== NFL draft ===
The New York Giants selected 20 draft picks in 20 rounds, with only 12 of them playing at all during their careers. All 12 players would be considered rookies their first year playing. One of the rookies, Lou Slaby, inherited the middle linebacker position that was left by Sam Huff only starting for 1 of his few years in the league.

== Roster ==
1964 New York Giants roster
Quarterbacks (QB): 10 Henry Schichtle; 14 Y. A. Tittle; 19 Gary Wood; Running backs (RB): 48 Clarence Childs; 47 Dick James; 27 Steve Thurlow; 29 Alex Webster; 30 Ernie Wheelwright; Wide receivers (WR): 16 Frank Gifford; 45 Homer Jones; 40 Joe Morrison RB; 37 R. C. Owens; Tight ends (TE): 89 Bobby Crespino; 88 Aaron Thomas	Offensive linemen (OL): 73 Roger Anderson T; 63 Bookie Bolin G; 79 Rosey Brown T; 62 Darrell Dess G; 78 Lane Howell T; 53 Greg Larson C; 71 Frank Lasky T; 65 Mickey Walker C/G; Defensive linemen (DL): 77 John Contoulis DT; 75 Jim Katcavage DE; 74 Jim Moran DT; 81 Andy Robustelli DE; 72 Andy Stynchula DT; 65 Robert Taylor DE	Linebackers (LB): 83 Tom Costello OLB; 87 Jerry Hillebrand OLB; 82 Tom Scott OLB; 51 Lou Slaby MLB; 31 Bill Winter OLB; Defensive backs (DB): 49 Erich Barnes CB; 26 Andy Nelson SS; 20 Jimmy Patton FS; 21 Allan Webb CB/S; Special teams (ST): 34 Don Chandler K/P	Practice squad: Ed Adamchik G; Tony DiMidio T; Dave Hoppmann RB; Reserve: 76 John LoVetere DT (IR); 22 Dick Lynch CB (IR); 25 Dick Pesonen S (IR); 85 Del Shofner WR (NF-Ill.); 66 Jack Stroud T (IR); 80 Joe Walton TE (IR); Rookies in italics

== Regular season ==
=== Schedule ===
Week	Date	Opponent	Result	Record	Venue	Attendance	Recap
1	September 13	at **Philadelphia Eagles**	**L** 7–38	0–1	Franklin Field	60,671	Recap
2	September 20	at **Pittsburgh Steelers**	**L** 24–27	0–2	Pitt Stadium	33,053	Recap
3	September 25	**Washington Redskins**	**W** 13–10	1–2	Yankee Stadium	62,996	Recap
4	October 4	at Detroit Lions	**L** 3–26	1–3	Tiger Stadium	54,836	Recap
5	October 11	at **Dallas Cowboys**	**T** 13–13	1–3–1	Cotton Bowl	33,324	Recap
6	October 18	**Philadelphia Eagles**	**L** 17–23	1–4–1	Yankee Stadium	62,978	Recap
7	October 25	at **Cleveland Browns**	**L** 20–42	1–5–1	Cleveland Municipal Stadium	81,050	Recap
8	November 1	**St. Louis Cardinals**	**W** 34–17	2–5–1	Yankee Stadium	63,072	Recap
9	November 8	**Dallas Cowboys**	**L** 21–31	2–6–1	Yankee Stadium	63,061	Recap
10	November 15	at **St. Louis Cardinals**	**T** 10–10	2–6–2	Busch Stadium I	29,608	Recap
11	November 22	**Pittsburgh Steelers**	**L** 17–44	2–7–2	Yankee Stadium	62,691	Recap
12	November 29	at **Washington Redskins**	**L** 21–36	2–8–2	D.C. Stadium	49,219	Recap
13	December 6	Minnesota Vikings	**L** 21–30	2–9–2	Yankee Stadium	62,802	Recap
14	December 12	**Cleveland Browns**	**L** 20–52	2–10–2	Yankee Stadium	63,007	Recap

Note: Intra-conference opponents are in bold text.

== Game summaries ==
=== Week 7: at Cleveland Browns ===
Cleveland Browns 42, New York Giants 20

Quarter	1	2	3	4	Total
Giants	6	0	7	7	20
Browns	0	7	7	28	42

at Cleveland Municipal Stadium, Cleveland, Ohio

- Date: October 25
- Game time: 1:30 p.m. EST
- Game weather: 50 °F (10 °C), relative humidity 57%, wind 14 mph
- Game attendance: 81,050
- Referee: Norm Schachter
- TV announcers (CBS): Chris Schenkel (NY) (second half) and Ken Coleman (CLE) (first half) (play-by-play), Pat Summerall (NY) (second half) and Warren Lahr (CLE) (first half) (color commentators)
- Pro-Football-Reference.com

Game information

First Quarter

- NY - Dick James 1 yard rush - (kick failed) Giants 6-0

Second Quarter

- CLE - Leroy Kelly 68 yard punt return - (Lou Groza kick) Browns 7-6

Third Quarter

- CLE - Paul Warfield 11 yard pass from Frank Ryan - (Lou Groza kick) Browns 14-6
- NY - Y. A. Tittle 7 yard rush - (Don Chandler kick) Browns 14-13

Fourth Quarter

- CLE - Paul Wiggin 2 yard fumble return - (Lou Groza kick) Browns 21-13
- CLE - Gary Collins 9 yard pass from Frank Ryan (Lou Groza kick) Browns 28-13
- CLE - Charley Scales 23 yard fumble return - (Lou Groza kick) Browns 35-13
- NY - Ernie Wheelwright 20 yard pass from Gary Wood - (Don Chandler kick) Browns 35-20
- CLE - Johnny Brewer 11 yard pass from Jim Ninowski - (Lou Groza kick) Browns 42-20

Giants

Browns

=== Week 14: vs. Cleveland Browns ===
Cleveland Browns 52, New York Giants 20

Quarter	1	2	3	4	Total
Browns	3	21	21	7	52
Giants	0	7	0	13	20

at Yankee Stadium (I), Bronx, New York

- Date: December 12
- Game time: 2:00 p.m. EST
- Game weather: 49 °F (9 °C), relative humidity 98%, wind 6.8 mph
- Game attendance: 63,007
- TV announcers (CBS): Ken Coleman (CLE) (second half) and Chris Schenkel (NY) (first half) (play-by-play), Warren Lahr (CLE) (second half) and Pat Summerall (NY) (first half) (color commentators)
- Pro-Football-Reference.com

Game information

First Quarter

- CLE - Lou Groza 39 yard field goal - Browns 3-0

Second Quarter

- NY - Dick James 7 yard pass from Y. A. Tittle - (Don Chandler kick) Giants 7-3
- CLE - Frank Ryan 13 yard run - (Lou Groza kick) Browns 10-7
- CLE - Gary Collins 11 yard pass from Frank Ryan - (Lou Groza kick) Browns 17-7
- CLE - Ernie Green 1 yard pass from Frank Ryan - (Lou Groza kick) Browns 24-7

Third Quarter

- CLE - Ernie Green 25 yard pass from Frank Ryan - (Lou Groza kick) Browns 31-7
- CLE - Paul Warfield 8 yard pass from Frank Ryan - (Lou Groza kick) Browns 38-7
- CLE - Jim Brown 8 yard pass from Frank Ryan - (Lou Groza kick) Browns 45-7

Fourth Quarter

- NY - Aaron Thomas 10 yard pass from Gary Wood - (Don Chandler kick) Browns 45-14
- CLE - Walter Roberts 24 yard pass from Jim Ninowski - (Lou Groza kick) Browns 52-14
- NY - Aaron Thomas 1 yard pass from Gary Wood - (kick failed) Browns 52-20

Browns

Giants

== Standings ==
NFL Eastern Conference
	W	L	T	PCT	CONF	PF	PA	STK
Cleveland Browns	10	3	1	.769	9–2–1	415	293	W1
St. Louis Cardinals	9	3	2	.750	8–2–2	357	331	W4
Philadelphia Eagles	6	8	0	.429	6–6	312	313	L1
Washington Redskins	6	8	0	.429	5–7	307	305	L2
Dallas Cowboys	5	8	1	.385	4–7–1	250	289	W1
Pittsburgh Steelers	5	9	0	.357	5–7	253	315	L1
New York Giants	2	10	2	.167	2–8–2	241	399	L4

Note: Tie games were not officially counted in the standings until 1972.

== See also ==
- List of New York Giants seasons
