= 1964 Philadelphia Eagles season =

NFL team season

- Owner: Jerry Wolman
- Head coach: Joe Kuharich
- Home stadium: Franklin Field

Results
- Record: 6–8
- Division place: 3rd (tied) NFL Eastern
- Playoffs: Did not qualify
- Pro Bowlers: K Sam Baker; C Jim Ringo; DT Floyd Peters; TE Pete Retzlaff; LB Maxie Baughan

The 1964 Philadelphia Eagles season was the franchise's thirty-second season in the National Football League. The team improved on their previous win total by finishing with a record of 6–8.

== Offseason ==
Joe Kuharich was hired as head coach of the Eagles after leaving the University of Notre Dame. He is still the only head coach with a lifetime losing record while coaching there, going 17–23 in four years. Owner Jerry Wolman gave Kuharich a fourteen-year, $1 million contract, and then traded future Hall of Famers Sonny Jurgensen and Tommy McDonald to the Washington Redskins and Dallas Cowboys.

The Eagles sent Lee Roy Caffey and their 1965 first round draft pick to the Packers. Earl Gros and Pro Bowler and Hall of Fame member Jim Ringo were acquired during Ringo's 1964 contract talks with Green Bay.

=== NFL draft ===
The 1964 NFL draft and the 1964 AFL draft were two different drafts held by their respective leagues. The NFL draft was held on December 2, 1963; its teams could draft any eligible player coming out of college. The AFL draft was held on November 30, 1963; it had territorial picks during the early rounds. These picks were players who lived in, or attended college, in certain areas, and was possibly the reason why the Eagles second round pick (sixteenth pick), was the AFL's first pick during the draft.

Some players made arrangements with AFL leaders to sign if certain teams drafted them; some signed contracts as soon as their last college games were over (on the field or in the parking lot).

The NFL Draft lasted twenty rounds with fourteen teams picking. The Eagles had the second pick in those rounds and picked eighteen players.

The overall pick in the draft was Dave Parks, an end from Texas Tech. The Eagles choose future Hall of Fame member Bob Brown, an offensive tackle from Nebraska. There were ten Hall of Fame members chosen during this draft, four of whom were chosen in the first round. The Dallas Cowboys had two, selecting Bob Hayes in the seventh round and Roger Staubach in the tenth round; however, Staubach was required to serve a four-year military obligation in the United States Navy before he could play NFL football because he was a graduate of the United States Naval Academy.

= Pro Bowler	= AFL All-Star	= Hall of Famer

Rd	PICK	PLAYER	POS	SCHOOL	AFL	Rd	Pick	Signed
1	2	Bob Brown ^{HOF}	Tackle	Nebraska				Eagles
2	16	Jack Concannon	Quarterback	Boston College	Boston	1	1	Eagles
3	30	_{Trade to Detroit Lions}						
4	46	Ray Kubala	Center	Texas A&M	Denver	7	49	Denver
5	58	Mickey Babb	End	Georgia	Oakland	13	103	
6	72	Al Denson	End	Florida A&M	Denver	6	47	Denver
7	86	Pete Goimarac	Center	West Virginia	San Diego	5	36	
8	100	_{Traded To New York Giants}						
9	114	Larry Smith	Back	Mississippi				
10	128	Tom Boris	Back	Purdue				
11	142	Bob Berry	Quarterback	Oregon	Denver	26	201	_{Acquired by Minnesota}
12	156	John Sapinsky	Tackle	William & Mary	Oakland	7	55	
13	170	Howard Kindig	Center	Cal State-Los Angeles	San Diego	14	112	San Diego
14	184	Ernie Arizzi	Back	Maryland				
15	198	Bob Burrows	Tackle	East Texas State	Kansas City	21	162	
16	212	Will Radosevich	Tackle	Wyoming	New York	22	171	
17	226	Mike Morgan	End	Louisiana State				Eagles
18	240	Izzy Lang	Running back	Tennessee State				Eagles
19	254	Dick Bowe	Tackle	Rice	Houston	25	198	
20	268	Tommy Lucas	Guard	Mississippi	San Diego	25	200	

== Personnel ==
=== Staff / Coaches ===
1964 Philadelphia Eagles staff
Front office: Principal / Majority Owner – Jerry Wolman; General manager – Vince McNally; Head coaches: Head coach - Joe Kuharich; Offensive coaches: Offensive Coordinator / Receivers - Herman Ball; Offensive Assistant - Mike Nixon; Offensive Line – Dick Stanfel	Defensive coaches: Defensive Coordinator - Dick Evans; Defensive Backs / Secondary – Fred Bruney

=== Roster ===
1964 Philadelphia Eagles roster
Quarterbacks (QB): 3 Jack Concannon; 10 King Hill; 16 Norm Snead; Running backs (RB): 22 Timmy Brown; 34 Earl Gros; 29 Izzy Lang; 33 Ollie Matson; 37 Tom Woodeshick; Wide receivers (WR): 32 Roger Gill; 81 Ron Goodwin; 25 Red Mack; 35 Ray Poage; Tight ends (TE): 44 Pete Retzlaff; 85 Ralph Smith	Offensive linemen (OL): 64 Ed Blaine G; 76 Bob Brown T; 67 Pete Case G; 78 Dave Graham T; 63 Lynn Hoyem G; 54 Jim Ringo C; 51 Jim Schrader C; 70 Jim Skaggs T; Defensive linemen (DL): 74 Riley Gunnels DE; 73 Ed Khayat DT; 75 John Meyers DT; 72 Floyd Peters DT; 68 Bobby Richards DE; 82 George Tarasovic DE; 84 Don Thompson DE	Linebackers (LB): 55 Maxie Baughan OLB; 43 Ralph Heck OLB; 83 Don Hultz MLB; 52 Dave Lloyd MLB; 89 Mike Morgan OLB; Defensive backs (DB): 45 Don Burroughs FS; 23 Claude Crabb CB/S; 22 Irv Cross CB; 49 Glenn Glass SS; 24 Nate Ramsey CB; 21 Joe Scarpati SS; Special teams (ST): 38 Sam Baker K/P	Reserve: Terry Kosens S (IR); Chuck Lamson S (IR); Jerry Mazzanti DE (Military); Mike McClellan CB/S (Military); Rookies in italics

== Regular season ==
=== Schedule ===
Week	Date	Opponent	Result	Record	Venue	Attendance	Recap
1	September 13	**New York Giants**	**W** 38–7	1–0	Franklin Field	60,671	Recap
2	September 20	San Francisco 49ers	**L** 24–28	1–1	Franklin Field	57,353	Recap
3	September 27	**Cleveland Browns**	**L** 28–20	1–2	Franklin Field	60,671	Recap
4	October 4	**Pittsburgh Steelers**	**W** 21–7	2–2	Franklin Field	59,354	Recap
5	October 11	at **Washington Redskins**	**L** 20–35	2–3	DC Stadium	49,219	Recap
6	October 18	at **New York Giants**	**W** 23–17	3–3	Yankee Stadium	62,978	Recap
7	October 25	at **Pittsburgh Steelers**	**W** 34–10	4–3	Pitt Stadium	38,393	Recap
8	November 1	**Washington Redskins**	**L** 10–21	4–4	Franklin Field	60,671	Recap
9	November 8	at Los Angeles Rams	**L** 10–20	4–5	Los Angeles Memorial Coliseum	53,994	Recap
10	November 15	at **Dallas Cowboys**	**W** 17–14	5–5	Cotton Bowl	55,972	Recap
11	November 22	**St. Louis Cardinals**	**L** 13–38	5–6	Franklin Field	60,671	Recap
12	November 29	at **Cleveland Browns**	**L** 24–38	5–7	Cleveland Municipal Stadium	79,289	Recap
13	December 6	**Dallas Cowboys**	**W** 24–14	6–7	Franklin Field	60,671	Recap
14	December 13	at **St. Louis Cardinals**	**L** 34–36	6–8	Busch Stadium I	24,636	Recap
Note: Intra-conference opponents are in **bold** text.

=== Season summary ===
==== Week 3: vs. Cleveland Browns ====
Cleveland Browns 28, Philadelphia Eagles 20

Quarter	1	2	3	4	Total
**Browns**	7	0	14	7	**28**
Eagles	7	6	0	7	**20**

at Franklin Field, Philadelphia

- Date: September 27
- Game time: 1:30 p.m. EDT
- Game weather: 64 °F (18 °C), relative humidity 70%, wind 12 mph
- Game attendance: 60,671
- TV announcers (CBS): Ken Coleman (CLE) (second half) and Jack Whitaker (PHI) (first half) (play-by-play), Warren Lahr (CLE) (second half) and Al Pollard (PHI) (first half) (color commentators)
- Pro-Football-Reference.com

Game information

First Quarter

- CLE – Ernie Green 37 yard rush – (Lou Groza kick) **Browns 7-0**
- PHI – Ollie Matson 1 yard rush – (Sam Baker kick) **Tied 7-7**

Second Quarter

- PHI – Sam Baker 12 yard field goal – **Eagles 10-7**
- PHI – Sam Baker 42 yard field goal – **Eagles 13-7**

Third Quarter

- CLE – Paul Warfield 24 yard pass from Frank Ryan – (Lou Groza kick) **Browns 14-13**
- CLE – Jim Brown 40 yard pass from Frank Ryan – (Lou Groza kick) **Browns 21-13**

Fourth Quarter

- CLE – Gary Collins 12 yard pass from Frank Ryan – (Lou Groza kick) **Browns 28-13**
- PHI – Ollie Matson 7 yard rush – (Sam Baker kick) **Browns 28-20**

Browns

Eagles

=== Week 12: at Cleveland Browns ===
Cleveland Browns 38, Philadelphia Eagles 24

Quarter	1	2	3	4	Total
Eagles	3	0	7	14	**24**
**Browns**	7	14	10	7	**38**

at Cleveland Municipal Stadium, Cleveland, Ohio

- Date: November 29
- Game time: 1:30 p.m. EDT
- Game weather: 32 °F (0 °C), relative humidity 65%, wind 15 mph, wind chill 22 °F (−6 °C)
- Game attendance: 79,289
- TV announcers (CBS): Jack Whitaker (PHI) (second half) and Ken Coleman (CLE) (first half) (play-by-play), Al Pollard (PHI) (second half) and Warren Lahr (CLE) (first half) (color commentators)
- Pro-Football-Reference.com

Game information

First Quarter

- CLE – Roger Shoals 0 yard fumble return – (Lou Groza kick) **Browns 7-0**
- PHI – Sam Baker 14 yard field goal – **Browns 7-3**

Second Quarter

- CLE – Sid Williams 0 yard fumble return – (Lou Groza kick) **Browns 14-3**
- CLE – Jim Houston 42 yard interception return – (Lou Groza kick) **Browns 21-3**

Third Quarter

- CLE – Lou Groza 37 yard field goal – **Browns 24-3**
- PHI – Timmy Brown 20 yard run – (Sam Baker kick) **Browns 24-10**
- CLE – Johnny Brewer 24 yard pass from Frank Ryan – (Lou Groza kick) **Browns 31-10**

Fourth Quarter

- PHI – Ron Goodwin 19 yard pass from Norm Snead – (Sam Baker kick) **Browns 31-17**
- CLE – Johnny Brewer 13 yard pass from Frank Ryan – (Lou Groza kick) **Browns 38-17**
- PHI – Pete Retzlaff 32 yard pass from Norm Snead – (Sam Baker kick) **Browns 38-24**

Eagles

Browns

== Standings ==
NFL Eastern Conference
	W	L	T	PCT	CONF	PF	PA	STK
Cleveland Browns	10	3	1	.769	9–2–1	415	293	W1
St. Louis Cardinals	9	3	2	.750	8–2–2	357	331	W4
Philadelphia Eagles	6	8	0	.429	6–6	312	313	L1
Washington Redskins	6	8	0	.429	5–7	307	305	L2
Dallas Cowboys	5	8	1	.385	4–7–1	250	289	W1
Pittsburgh Steelers	5	9	0	.357	5–7	253	315	L1
New York Giants	2	10	2	.167	2–8–2	241	399	L4

Note: Tie games were not officially counted in the standings until 1972.

== Awards and honors ==
Pro Bowl Players

Sam Baker (P)
Maxie Baughan (LB)
Irv Cross (DB)
Floyd Peters (DT)
Pete Retzlaff (TE)
Jim Ringo (C)
