= Charley Johnson =

American football player (1938–2024)

No. 12
- Position: Quarterback

Personal information
- Born: November 22, 1938; Big Spring, Texas, U.S.
- Died: September 3, 2024 (aged 85); Las Cruces, New Mexico, U.S.
- Listed height: 6 ft 1 in (1.85 m)
- Listed weight: 200 lb (91 kg)

Career information
- High school: Big Spring
- College: Schreiner (1956-1957); New Mexico State (1958-1960)
- NFL draft: 1960: 10th round, 109th overall pick
- AFL draft: 1961: 8th round, 64th overall pick

Career history

Playing
- St. Louis Cardinals (1961–1969); Houston Oilers (1970–1971); Denver Broncos (1972–1975)

Coaching
- Denver Broncos (1976) Quarterbacks coach

Awards and highlights
- Pro Bowl (1963); Denver Broncos Ring of Fame

Career NFL statistics
- Passing attempts: 3,392
- Passing completions: 1,737
- Completion percentage: 51.2%
- TD–INT: 170–181
- Passing yards: 24,410
- Passer rating: 69.2
- Rushing yards: 539
- Rushing touchdowns: 10
- Stats at Pro Football Reference

Charley Lane Johnson (November 22, 1938 – September 3, 2024) was an American professional football player who was a quarterback in the National Football League (NFL). He played college football for the New Mexico State Aggies. Johnson played in the NFL for 15 years with three teams: the St. Louis Cardinals, Houston Oilers, and Denver Broncos. He completed a Ph.D. in chemical engineering while playing in the NFL and became the head of New Mexico State University's chemical engineering department after his playing career.

== Early life ==
Johnson was born in Big Spring, Texas, on November 22, 1938. He was a multisport athlete at Big Springs High School, but did not play football until his senior year.

== College career ==
Johnson initially was set to play football with a scholarship at Schreiner Institute, but the school dropped football the season he arrived. He then transferred to New Mexico State University, but did so with a scholarship to play basketball instead and had to walk-on to play football there, though he eventually won the starting job at quarterback.

During his college football career at New Mexico State he became the only person to date to be named Most Valuable Player of the Sun Bowl in consecutive years, winning the award in 1959 and 1960. He is a member of the NMSU Sports Hall of Fame (1970), and was the first player in the history of the NMSU football program to have his jersey number (33) retired.

== Professional career ==
Johnson was a late-round draft pick by both the San Diego Chargers of the AFL, and St. Louis Cardinals of the NFL, opting to go to St. Louis. After just 13 passing attempts in his 1961 rookie season, he became the Cardinals' primary starter for the next five years.

He was named to the NFL Pro Bowl in 1963 after career-bests 3,280 passing yards and 28 passing touchdowns, and was featured on the cover of Sports Illustrated twice (December 14, 1964 and November 1, 1965). In 1964, he led the league with 223 completions, 420 attempts, 3,045 passing yards, and 24 interceptions. In 1966, he had a league-leading four 4th quarter comebacks. He played backup to Jim Hart in 1967, at least in part because of military service required of Johnson. Despite starting just two games, Johnson again led the league with two 4th quarter comebacks in 1968, tied with Hart.

He split time with Hart in 1969 before being traded to Houston. There he started 14 games in two seasons (1970–71), before ending his career with a four-year stint in Denver. He started 9 games for the Broncos in 1972, and all 14 games for the 7–5–2 squad in 1973. This was the first winning season in Broncos history. His teammates named him the Broncos Most Valuable Player, and he was selected for first-team All-AFC honors by Pro Football Weekly and United Press International. In 1974, his 14th season, he tied for the league lead with Cincinnati's Ken Anderson in yards per attempt with 8.1, a first for Johnson. He began his final year with a 90-yard touchdown pass to Rick Upchurch against the Kansas City Chiefs, the only 90+ yard pass that decade by a Bronco. As of 2017, his 16.45 yards per attempt in the game remains a franchise record, and in 1986 he was named a member of the Denver Broncos Ring of Fame.

He retired in 1975 with a 59–57–8 record as a starter, with 1,737 completions (at the time, ranked 13th all-time in professional football) on 3,392 attempts (13th), for 24,410 yards (14th), 170 touchdowns (15th), 181 interceptions (14th) and a passer rating of 69.2 (20th).

== NFL career statistics ==
Legend
| | Led the league |
| **Bold** | Career high |

| Year | Team | Games | | | Passing | | | | | | | | | Rushing | | | | | Sacks | |
| Year | Team | GP | GS | Record | Cmp | Att | Pct | Yds | Y/A | Lng | TD | Int | Rtg | Att | Yds | Avg | Lng | TD | Sck | Yds |
|---|---|---|---|---|---|---|---|---|---|---|---|---|---|---|---|---|---|---|---|---|
| 1961 | STL | 4 | 0 | 0-0 | 5 | 13 | 38.5 | 51 | 3.9 | 16 | 0 | 2 | 10.9 | 1 | -3 | -3.0 | -3 | 0 | 1 | 10 |
| 1962 | STL | 11 | 10 | 3-6-1 | 150 | 308 | 48.7 | 2,440 | 7.9 | 86 | 16 | 20 | 65.9 | 25 | 138 | **5.5** | **19** | **3** | 17 | 184 |
| 1963 | STL | 14 | 14 | **9-5** | 222 | **423** | 52.5 | **3,280** | 7.8 | 78 | **28** | 21 | 79.5 | **41** | **143** | 3.5 | 16 | 1 | **40** | **372** |
| 1964 | STL | 14 | 14 | **9-3-2** | **223** | 420 | 53.1 | 3,045 | 7.3 | 78 | 21 | **24** | 69.4 | 31 | 93 | 3.0 | **19** | 2 | 37 | 298 |
| 1965 | STL | 11 | 11 | 5-6 | 155 | 322 | 48.1 | 2,439 | 7.6 | 78 | 18 | 15 | 73.0 | 25 | 60 | 2.4 | 15 | 1 | 20 | 184 |
| 1966 | STL | 9 | 9 | 7-1-1 | 103 | 205 | 50.2 | 1,334 | 6.5 | 69 | 10 | 11 | 65.0 | 20 | 39 | 2.0 | 9 | 2 | 18 | 170 |
| 1967 | STL | 5 | 0 | 0-0 | 12 | 29 | 41.4 | 162 | 5.6 | 36 | 1 | 3 | 31.8 | 0 | 0 | 0.0 | 0 | 0 | 2 | 10 |
| 1968 | STL | 7 | 2 | 1-1 | 29 | 67 | 43.3 | 330 | 4.9 | 30 | 1 | 1 | 57.4 | 5 | -1 | -0.2 | 3 | 0 | 7 | 64 |
| 1969 | STL | 12 | 9 | 2-6-1 | 131 | 260 | 50.4 | 1,847 | 7.1 | 84 | 13 | 13 | 69.5 | 17 | 51 | 3.0 | 15 | 1 | 11 | 101 |
| 1970 | HOU | 10 | 10 | 3-7 | 144 | 281 | 51.2 | 1,652 | 5.9 | 63 | 7 | 12 | 59.8 | 5 | 3 | 0.6 | 9 | 0 | 15 | 124 |
| 1971 | HOU | 14 | 4 | 0-4 | 46 | 94 | 48.9 | 592 | 6.3 | 70 | 3 | 7 | 48.7 | 2 | 0 | 0.0 | 0 | 0 | 8 | 61 |
| 1972 | DEN | 12 | 9 | 4-5 | 132 | 238 | 55.5 | 1,783 | 7.5 | 60 | 14 | 14 | 74.6 | 3 | 0 | 0.0 | 0 | 0 | 12 | 82 |
| 1973 | DEN | 14 | 14 | 7-5-2 | 184 | 346 | 53.2 | 2,465 | 7.1 | 62 | 20 | 17 | 74.9 | 7 | -2 | -0.3 | 0 | 0 | 26 | 177 |
| 1974 | DEN | 14 | 12 | 6-5-1 | 136 | 244 | **55.7** | 1,969 | **8.1** | 73 | 13 | 9 | **84.5** | 4 | -3 | -0.8 | 0 | 0 | 36 | 270 |
| 1975 | DEN | 14 | 6 | 3-3 | 65 | 142 | 45.8 | 1,021 | 7.2 | **90** | 5 | 12 | 46.7 | 10 | 21 | 2.1 | 13 | 0 | 10 | 79 |
| Career | | 165 | 124 | 59-57-8 | 1,737 | 3,392 | 51.2 | 24,410 | 7.2 | 90 | 170 | 181 | 69.2 | 196 | 539 | 2.8 | 19 | 10 | 260 | 2,186 |

== Football awards and honors ==
Johnson has received the following awards and honors, among others;

- Big Spring Sports Hall of Fame
- Schreiner University Athletic Hall of Honor
- New Mexico State University (NMSU) Sports Hall of Fame
- State of Texas Sports Hall of Fame
- New Mexico Sports Hall of Fame
- Denver Broncos Ring of Fame
- Jersey number retired by NMSU

== Outside of football ==
An engineering major at NMSU, Johnson obtained his bachelor's degree in chemical engineering with a 4.0 GPA in 1961. Johnson continued his academic pursuits and obtained master's and doctoral degrees in chemical engineering from Washington University in St. Louis while also playing in the NFL, obtaining his Ph.D. during his time with the Houston Oilers.

As an undergraduate, Johnson was part of NMSU's Army ROTC; he used his graduate studies to delay his commission until 1967, when he was called into active duty. He was deemed unfit for combat, but was stationed with and worked for NASA as a second lieutenant in the United States Army Reserve for two years, while simultaneously playing for the Cardinals and working on his doctoral studies.

After his football career and military service were over, he worked in industry, opening Johnson Compression Services in Houston in 1981 and working as an engineering and product development consultant until 1999. In 2000, he was hired to head New Mexico State's chemical engineering department, a position he held until 2004. He then became a professor in the department until his retirement in May 2012. Johnson was also briefly the interim head coach of the NMSU football team during the off-season, following the firing of Hal Mumme in January 2009.

Johnson appeared as an imposter on the February 14, 1966, episode of the CBS game show To Tell the Truth. He revealed his true identity after receiving one vote.

== Death ==
Johnson died on September 3, 2024, at age 85. His wife of 62 years, Barbara, had pre-deceased him.

== See also ==
- List of NCAA major college football yearly passing leaders
