= Chuck Hinton (defensive lineman) =

American football player (1939–1999)

No. 76, 64, 75
- Position: Defensive tackle

Personal information
- Born: August 11, 1939; Raleigh, North Carolina, U.S.
- Died: January 30, 1999 (aged 59); Raleigh, North Carolina, U.S.
- Listed height: 6 ft 5 in (1.96 m)
- Listed weight: 257 lb (117 kg)

Career information
- High school: Raleigh (NC) John W. Ligon
- College: North Carolina Central
- NFL draft: 1962: 2nd round, 17th overall pick
- AFL draft: 1962: 4th round, 27th overall pick

Career history
- Wheeling Ironmen (1963); Pittsburgh Steelers (1964–1970); New York Jets (1971); Baltimore Colts (1972)

Career NFL statistics
- Fumble recoveries: 7
- Interceptions: 2
- Touchdowns: 2
- Stats at Pro Football Reference

Charles Dudley Hinton (August 11, 1939 – January 30, 1999) was an American professional football defensive tackle in the National Football League. He played for the Pittsburgh Steelers (1964–1970), the New York Jets, and the Baltimore Colts (1972). He went to North Carolina Central University. While with the Steelers, he anchored the defensive front with Gene "Big Daddy" Lipscomb. He was an outstanding run defender as was Lipscomb.

Hinton was part of a noteworthy play in 1964 for the Pittsburgh Steelers, when he intercepted a pass by Y. A. Tittle of the New York Giants and returned it for a touchdown during the Steelers' 27–24 victory at Pitt Stadium on September 20. The play sparked a 20-point rally, but is more remembered for the famous reaction photo taken by Morris Bowman of the Pittsburgh Post-Gazette of the veteran Tittle, kneeling, his helmet off, bleeding from his forehead.
