= Jim Martin (American football) =

American football player (1924–2002)

- Martin on a 1952 football card

No. 50, 89, 62, 61, 47, 38
- Positions: Guard, linebacker, placekicker

Personal information
- Born: April 8, 1924; Cleveland, Ohio, U.S.
- Died: October 9, 2002 (aged 78); Wildomar, California, U.S.
- Listed height: 6 ft 2 in (1.88 m)
- Listed weight: 227 lb (103 kg)

Career information
- High school: East Technical (Cleveland)
- College: Notre Dame
- NFL draft: 1950: 2nd round, 26th overall pick

Career history

Playing
- Cleveland Browns (1950); Detroit Lions (1951–1961); Baltimore Colts (1963); Washington Redskins (1964)

Coaching
- Denver Broncos (1962) Assistant; Mater Dei High School (1965) Assistant; Idaho State (1966) Assistant; Detroit Lions (1967–1972) Assistant; Portland Storm (1974-1975) Assistant

Awards and highlights
- 4× NFL champion (1950, 1952, 1953, 1957); NFL Comeback Player of the Year (1963); Pro Bowl (1961); 3× National champion (1946, 1947, 1949); First-team All-American (1949)

Career NFL statistics
- Field goals: 92/192
- Field goal %: 47.9
- Longest field goal: 52
- Points scored: 434
- Interceptions: 6
- Stats at Pro Football Reference
- College Football Hall of Fame

James Richard "Jungle Jim" Martin (April 8, 1924 – October 9, 2002) was an American professional football player who was a guard, linebacker and placekicker for 14 seasons in the National Football League (NFL) in the 1950s and 1960s, primarily with the Detroit Lions. He was selected to the Pro Bowl, the NFL's all-star game, after the 1961 season, and went on to be an assistant coach after his playing career. He was an All-American playing college football for the Notre Dame Fighting Irish and was inducted into the College Football Hall of Fame in 1995.

Martin was a star athlete at his high school in Cleveland, Ohio. He joined the United States Marine Corps after graduating, and served in the Pacific War until it ended in 1945. He then enrolled at Notre Dame, where he was part of a teams that won the college football national championship in 1946, 1947 and 1949 under head coach Frank Leahy. Martin was named a first-team All-American in 1949 by several news organizations.

The NFL's Cleveland Browns selected Martin in the 1950 draft, and he played there for one season during which the team won the NFL championship. Browns head coach Paul Brown traded him to the Detroit Lions, where he played between 1951 and 1961, at first as a guard and later as a linebacker and placekicker. The Lions won NFL championships in 1952, 1953 and 1957, all three of them victories over the Browns. After spending a year as an assistant coach for the Denver Broncos, an American Football League team, Martin returned to playing in 1963 for the Baltimore Colts, and played for a final year in 1964 for the Washington Redskins. When he left the Lions, Martin was the team's all-time leading field goal kicker; he also became the first NFL player to kick two field goals of more than 50 yards in a single game in 1960.

Martin was an assistant high school coach in California and at Idaho State University before taking a job as an assistant with the Lions between 1967 and 1972. He also coached in the World Football League in the mid-1970s. Martin later worked as a court officer in Michigan. He was inducted into the Greater Cleveland Sports Hall of Fame in 1976 and into the college hall of fame in 1995. He died in 2002.

== Early life and college ==
Martin grew up in Cleveland, Ohio and attended the city's East Technical High School, where he was captain of the football and swimming teams. He played center on the football team. After graduating, Martin joined the U.S. Marines during World War II, and served in the Pacific War. He was part of a small crew in the Marines' Fifth Amphibious Reconnaissance Battalion that landed on the island of Tinian in 1944 to do preliminary scouting in preparation for its seizure by Allied forces in the Battle of Tinian. Wearing only black swim trunks, diving fins and face masks, Martin and his three-man unit discovered a string of sea mines near a beach where Allied forces were set to land, helping guide the invasion to safer landing places. He was awarded a Bronze Star for his service in the war.

After the war ended in 1945, Martin returned to the U.S. and enrolled at the University of Notre Dame. Coached by Frank Leahy, who had met and recruited Martin during the war on Iwo Jima, Notre Dame won the college football national championship by finishing first in the AP Poll in both 1946 and 1947. Martin played as an end on the team, working on both offense and defense, and was nicknamed "Jungle Jim" because of his service in the jungles of the Pacific islands. Notre Dame finished the 1948 season with a 9–0–1 win–loss–tie record and ranked second in the AP Poll. Martin switched from end to left offensive and defensive tackle for the 1949 season, when Notre Dame again finished first in the polls and won a national championship. Notre Dame did not lose a game during Martin's tenure, although it tied twice. Martin, who was co-captain in 1949, was named a first-team All-American that year by the Associated Press, the Newspaper Enterprise Association and the International News Service. He also boxed, and won Notre Dame's heavyweight title in 1949. The following summer, he played in the College All-Star Game, a now-defunct contest between the National Football League (NFL) champion and a selection of the country's best college players. He also played in the East–West Shrine Game, another college all-star game.

== Professional career ==
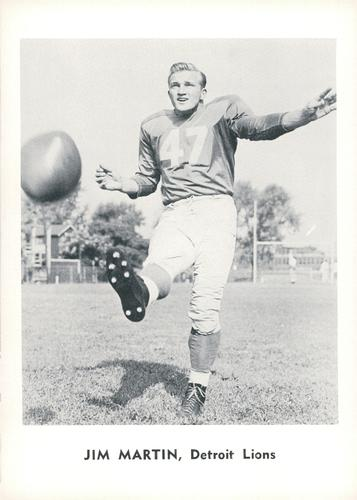
Martin in 1961

The Cleveland Browns of the NFL selected Martin 26th overall in the second round of the 1950 draft. Led by an offense that featured quarterback Otto Graham, fullback Marion Motley and ends Dante Lavelli and Mac Speedie, Cleveland had won four championships in the All-America Football Conference leading up to the 1950 season, the team's first in the NFL. With Martin playing at defensive end, the Browns finished the 1950 season with a 10–2 record and beat the Los Angeles Rams to win the NFL championship. In a divisional playoff game against the New York Giants before the championship, Martin sacked Giants quarterback Charlie Conerly in his own end zone for a safety that helped secure a narrow 8–3 victory. The Rams scored a touchdown on their first play from scrimmage in the championship game, an 82-yard pass from Bob Waterfield to Glenn Davis. Martin was covering Davis and slipped on the play, although the Browns came back to win in the final seconds of the game.

Cleveland head coach Paul Brown orchestrated a trade in 1951 that sent Martin and four other players to the Detroit Lions in exchange for the Lions' first and sixteenth picks in the following year's draft, plus cash. With the Lions, Martin helped fill a gap left by the departure of defensive end Jim Cain for service in the Army. The team finished the 1951 season with a 7–4–1 record, good for second in the NFL's National division. Led by budding quarterback Bobby Layne and halfback Doak Walker, the Lions improved to 9–3 the following year, when Martin switched to left guard. The team went on to beat the Browns in the NFL championship. Another championship victory over the Browns followed in 1953, this time by a narrow 17–16 margin.

Detroit finished the 1954 regular season on top of the NFL West and again faced the Browns in the championship game, but lost by a score of 56–10. Martin switched from guard to linebacker the following year, when Detroit had a losing record. The team improved in 1956 and won another NFL championship over the Browns in 1957. Martin stayed with the Lions through the 1961 season. A strong placekicker, Martin was used primarily on kickoffs and on field goals in his later seasons in Detroit. In 1960, he became the first player in NFL history to kick two field goals longer than 50 yards in one game. He was selected for the Pro Bowl, the NFL's annual all-star game, in 1961 after leading the team in scoring with 15 field goals and 25 extra points.

Martin, who had become the Lions' all-time leading field goal kicker in 1961, left the team the following February to take a job as an assistant coach with the Denver Broncos, a team in the American Football League. He returned to playing in 1963 as a kicker for the Baltimore Colts, spending one year there; he made 24 out of 39 field goals on the season, leading the league in the former category. For his comeback into the league at the age of 39, he was named NFL Comeback Player of the Year. He then spent a final year kicking for the Washington Redskins before retiring as a player.

== Coaching career ==
After ending his playing career, Martin became an assistant coach at Mater Dei High School in California in 1965. After a year there, he became an assistant coach in 1966 at Idaho State University. The Lions then hired him as an assistant in 1967, and he stayed with his old team through the 1972 season. Martin subsequently coached for the Portland Storm in the World Football League between 1974 and 1975.

== Later life and death ==
Later in life, Martin served as an officer in Michigan's 48th Michigan District Courts. He was inducted into the Greater Cleveland Sports Hall of Fame in 1976 and into the College Football Hall of Fame in 1995. He died in 2002.
