= 1964 NFL season =

American football season

Regular season
- Duration: September 12 – December 27, 1964
- East Champions: Cleveland Browns
- West Champions: Baltimore Colts

Championship Game
- Champions: Cleveland Browns

NFL teams: West, East

The 1964 NFL season was the 45th regular season of the National Football League. Before the season started, NFL commissioner Pete Rozelle reinstated Green Bay Packers running back Paul Hornung and Detroit Lions defensive tackle Alex Karras, who had been suspended for the 1963 season due to gambling.

Beginning this season, the home team in each game was allowed the option of wearing their white jerseys. Since 1957, league rules had mandated that the visiting team wear white, and the home team wear colored jerseys. The NFL also increased the regular season roster limit from 37 to 40 active players, which would remain unchanged for a decade.

The season ended when the Cleveland Browns shut out the Baltimore Colts 27–0 in the NFL Championship Game.

== Draft ==
The 1964 NFL draft was held on December 2, 1963, at Chicago's Sheraton Hotel & Towers. With the first pick, the San Francisco 49ers selected end Dave Parks from Texas Tech University.

== Rule changes ==
=== Active roster changes ===
Prior to the season, the NFL club owners voted to increase the regular season roster limit from 37 to 40 active players, the largest in league history up to that point. This standard would remain in place until the 1974 season.

=== New uniform rules ===
The 1964 season introduced a noteworthy change in uniform rules. While the league had dictated since 1957 that the home team must wear a colored jersey and the visitors a white one, teams were now given the option of wearing their white jerseys at home. As a result, the Browns (who wore white at home before 1957), Cardinals, Colts (except for one home game which was originally scheduled to be an away game), Cowboys, Rams, Redskins, Steelers (for one game vs. Rams) and Vikings (except for most of one game in which the Lions forgot to bring their blue jerseys) did so.

The Redskins and Vikings reverted to wearing dark jerseys at home in 1965; Washington would not wear white at home again until 1981, and Minnesota did not until 2022.

The Cardinals would not wear red at home until 1966, the Colts did not wear blue at home until 1966, the Rams would not do so again until 1972, the Browns only once until 1975, and the Cowboys, aside from an unwilling use of their blue tops as the "home" team in Super Bowl V, have since continuously worn white at home (although Dallas has worn blue jerseys at home, whether it be the current design or a throwback, sporadically since 2001). The Steelers would wear white at home for most home games from 1966 until 1969 (the first year of head coach Chuck Noll) but would not wear white as the "home" team until Super Bowl XL in 2005 and have not worn white in a game in Pittsburgh since Three Rivers Stadium opened in 1970.

== Deaths ==
- July 27 - Bo Farrington, age 28. Played Wide Receiver for the Chicago Bears from 1960-1963.
  - Willie Galimore, age 29. Played running back for the Chicago Bears, killed in a car crash that also claimed the life of Bears teammate Bo Farrington.

== Division races ==
The Western Division race started with Baltimore losing its opener at Minnesota, 34–24. After that, the Colts went on an 11-game winning streak, taking the lead on October 4 with their 35–20 win over the Rams, and clinching a spot in the title game on November 22.

In the Eastern Division, the Browns and the Cardinals played to a 33–33 tie on September 20 and were both 4–1–1 after six games. In Week Seven, Cleveland beat New York 42–20, while St. Louis fell to Dallas, 31–13. When the Cardinals beat the Browns 28–19 in Week Thirteen, they were only a game behind and needed a win and a Cleveland loss to have a chance for a playoff. St. Louis won, 36–34 in Philadelphia, but Cleveland also won, 52–20 over the Giants.

| Week | Western | | Eastern | |
|---|---|---|---|---|
| 1 | 4 teams (Det, GB, LA, Min) | 1–0–0 | 3 teams (Cle, Phi, StL) | 1–0–0 |
| 2 | Tie (Det, LA) | 1–0–1 | Tie (Cle, StL) | 1–0–1 |
| 3 | Los Angeles Rams | 2–0–1 | Tie (Cle, StL) | 2–0–1 |
| 4 | Baltimore Colts | 3–1–0 | Tie (Cle, StL) | 3–0–1 |
| 5 | Baltimore Colts | 4–1–0 | Tie (Cle, StL) | 3–1–1 |
| 6 | Baltimore Colts | 5–1–0 | Tie (Cle, StL) | 4–1–1 |
| 7 | Baltimore Colts | 6–1–0 | Cleveland Browns | 5–1–1 |
| 8 | Baltimore Colts | 7–1–0 | Cleveland Browns | 6–1–1 |
| 9 | Baltimore Colts | 8–1–0 | Cleveland Browns | 7–1–1 |
| 10 | Baltimore Colts | 9–1–0 | Cleveland Browns | 8–1–1 |
| 11 | Baltimore Colts | 10–1–0 | Cleveland Browns | 8–2–1 |
| 12 | Baltimore Colts | 11–1–0 | Cleveland Browns | 9–2–1 |
| 13 | Baltimore Colts | 11–2–0 | Cleveland Browns | 9–3–1 |
| 14 | Baltimore Colts | 12–2–0 | Cleveland Browns | 10–3–1 |

== Final standings ==
NFL Eastern Conference
| | W | L | T | PCT | CONF | PF | PA | STK |
|---|---|---|---|---|---|---|---|---|
| Cleveland Browns | 10 | 3 | 1 | .769 | 9–2–1 | 415 | 293 | W1 |
| St. Louis Cardinals | 9 | 3 | 2 | .750 | 8–2–2 | 357 | 331 | W4 |
| Philadelphia Eagles | 6 | 8 | 0 | .429 | 6–6 | 312 | 313 | L1 |
| Washington Redskins | 6 | 8 | 0 | .429 | 5–7 | 307 | 305 | L2 |
| Dallas Cowboys | 5 | 8 | 1 | .385 | 4–7–1 | 250 | 289 | W1 |
| Pittsburgh Steelers | 5 | 9 | 0 | .357 | 5–7 | 253 | 315 | L1 |
| New York Giants | 2 | 10 | 2 | .167 | 2–8–2 | 241 | 399 | L4 |

Note: Tie games were not officially counted in the standings until 1972.

NFL Western Conference
| | W | L | T | PCT | CONF | PF | PA | STK |
|---|---|---|---|---|---|---|---|---|
| Baltimore Colts | 12 | 2 | 0 | .857 | 10–2 | 428 | 225 | W1 |
| Green Bay Packers (Note: Green Bay was awarded the Playoff Bowl berth from the Western Conference by outscoring Minnesota 65–37 in their two meetings.) | 8 | 5 | 1 | .615 | 6–5–1 | 342 | 245 | T1 |
| Minnesota Vikings | 8 | 5 | 1 | .615 | 6–5–1 | 355 | 296 | W3 |
| Detroit Lions | 7 | 5 | 2 | .583 | 6–4–2 | 280 | 260 | W2 |
| Los Angeles Rams | 5 | 7 | 2 | .417 | 3–7–2 | 283 | 339 | T1 |
| Chicago Bears | 5 | 9 | 0 | .357 | 5–7 | 260 | 379 | L2 |
| San Francisco 49ers | 4 | 10 | 0 | .286 | 3–9 | 236 | 330 | L1 |

== Postseason ==
=== NFL Championship Game ===
Cleveland 27, Baltimore 0 at Cleveland Municipal Stadium, in Cleveland, Ohio on December 27.

=== Playoff Bowl ===
The Playoff Bowl was between the division runners-up, for third place in the league. This was its fifth year, and it was played a week after the title game.

- St. Louis 24, Green Bay 17 at Orange Bowl, Miami, Florida, January 3, 1965

== Awards ==
| Most Valuable Player | Johnny Unitas, quarterback, Baltimore Colts |
| Coach of the Year | Don Shula, Baltimore Colts |

== Coaching changes ==
- Philadelphia Eagles: Nick Skorich was replaced by Joe Kuharich.

== Stadium changes ==
The Pittsburgh Steelers started to play full time at Pitt Stadium, no longer holding games at Forbes Field

== See also ==
- 1964 American Football League season
