= Eddie Gallaher =

American radio personality (1915–2003)

Eddie Gallaher (February 27, 1915 – November 26, 2003) was an American radio personality in Washington, D.C., from 1946 to 2000.

== Early career ==
Gallaher was born on February 27, 1915, in Washington, D.C., He was raised in Tulsa, Oklahoma, and attended the University of Tulsa. In 1934, Gallaher, then working as a golf pro, began his radio career after a successful audition for the new radio station KTUL. In 1938 he moved to WCCO in Minneapolis, where he worked as a newscaster, disc jockey and play-by-play announcer for the Minneapolis Millers and Minnesota Golden Gophers football team. During World War II, Gallaher served on a United States Navy destroyer escort.

== Work in Washington, D.C. ==
In 1946, Gallaher joined WTOP in Washington, D.C., as the night disc jockey. The following year he succeeded Arthur Godfrey as host of the morning Sundial program. Due to the program's popularity, Gallaher was also given a 15-minute encore at 9:15 am, a 5 pm to 6 pm Moonlight Matinee program, and an 11:15 pm to 12:00 am Moondial show in addition to the 7:45 am to 9 am Sundial. He played songs by Percy Faith, Lawrence Welk, and Ella Fitzgerald before rival hosts could secure copies. Gallaher also hosted the D.C. version of Shadow Stumpers on WTOP-TV. From 1955 to 1965, Gallaher called Washington Redskins games, first on radio, then on television. In 1968, WTOP switched to an all-news format and after a brief stint as a news anchor, Gallager moved to WASH. In 1982, Gallaher joined WWDC (known as WGAY during his final years with the station), where he hosted an easy listening program until his retirement on December 22, 2000. At that time, he was the last of the Washington, D.C., hosts from the Golden Age of Radio still hosting a daily show, and the only live host at WGAY. His signature closing phrase was "It's so nice to know so many nice people." Within three months, Clear Channel converted the station to business broadcasting and changed its call letters to WWRC.

== Personal life ==
Gallaher died November 26, 2003, at a Washington, D.C., Methodist Home from complications of hip surgery.
