= Charley Scales =

American gridiron football player (1938–2023)

No. 34, 36, 31, 32
- Position: Running back

Personal information
- Born: January 11, 1938; Pittsburgh, Pennsylvania, U.S.
- Died: June 18, 2023 (aged 85); Pittsburgh, Pennsylvania, U.S.
- Listed height: 5 ft 11 in (1.80 m)
- Listed weight: 210 lb (95 kg)

Career information
- High school: Homestead (Homestead, Pennsylvania)
- College: Indiana
- NFL draft: 1960: undrafted

Career history
- Pittsburgh Steelers (1960–1961); Cleveland Browns (1962–1965); Atlanta Falcons (1966); Montreal Alouettes (1967)

Awards and highlights
- NFL champion (1964)

Career NFL statistics
- Rushing yards: 603
- Rushing average: 3.8
- Receptions: 21
- Receiving yards: 144
- Total touchdowns: 5
- Stats at Pro Football Reference

Charles Anderson Scales (January 11, 1938 – June 18, 2023) was an American professional football player who played as a running back for seven seasons in the National Football League (NFL) for the Pittsburgh Steelers, Cleveland Browns, and Atlanta Falcons. His final season was played in the Canadian Football League (CFL) with the Montreal Alouettes, for whom he played 13 games, gaining 370 yards on 101 carries, with 2 touchdowns.

== Professional career ==
=== Pittsburgh Steelers ===
A Pittsburgh native, Scales played his first two NFL seasons with the Steelers, signing with the team as a free agent. As a backup to fullback John Henry Johnson, Scales carried the ball 26 times for 81 yards in 1960 and 50 times for 184 yards in 1961. He did not score a touchdown as a member of the Steelers.

=== Cleveland Browns ===
Scales was traded to Cleveland prior to the 1962 exhibition season for one of Cleveland's two 1963 fifth-round draft picks (the Browns had acquired a second fifth-round pick in a trade with Detroit). Scales was acquired, according to Browns head coach Paul Brown, to compete with Preston Powell as a backup fullback to Jim Brown. Coach Brown said that Scales had "bothered" the Browns in exhibition games. That, plus the fact that the Steelers had selected fullback Bob Ferguson in the first round of the 1962 NFL draft, thus making Scales expendable, prompted the trade.

In four seasons with the Browns, Scales rushed for 338 yards, scoring four touchdowns. He caught 10 passes for 97 yards.

Scales was traded to the expansion Atlanta Falcons on August 23, 1966, for a draft choice. He scored two touchdowns against Atlanta in an exhibition game just a few days prior to the trade.

== Death ==
Scales died in Pittsburgh on June 18, 2023, at the age of 85.
