= Ernie Green =

American football player (born 1938)

No. 48
- Positions: Halfback, Fullback

Personal information
- Born: October 15, 1938 (age 88); Columbus, Georgia, U.S.
- Listed height: 6 ft 2 in (1.88 m)
- Listed weight: 205 lb (93 kg)

Career information
- High school: William H. Spencer (Columbus)
- College: Louisville
- NFL draft: 1962: 14th round, 196th overall pick

Career history

Playing
- Green Bay Packers (1962)*; Cleveland Browns (1962–1968)
- * Offseason or practice squad member only

Coaching
- Cleveland Browns (1969) Offensive backs coach

Awards and highlights
- NFL champion (1964); 2x Pro Bowl (1966, 1967); Cleveland Browns legends (2012); Louisville Cardinals Ring of Honor

Career NFL statistics
- Rushing yards: 3,204
- Rushing average: 4.8
- Receptions: 195
- Receiving yards: 2,036
- Total touchdowns: 35
- Stats at Pro Football Reference

Ernest E. Green (born October 15, 1938) is an American former professional football player who was a halfback and fullback for the Cleveland Browns of the National Football League (NFL). He played college football for the Louisville Cardinals.

== Early life ==
Born and raised in Columbus, Georgia, Green is a 1958 graduate of Spencer High School. He was a star running back on the school's football team, senior class president and a member of the National Honor Society. He was honored as the first Greenwave football player to have his jersey number retired on January 20, 2018.

== College ==
Green attended the University of Louisville from 1958 to 1961, rushing for more than 1,500 yards in his college football career with the Cardinals and twice leading the team in that department, Earning him all American honors. He also excelled in baseball, spurning contract offers in order to remain on the gridiron.

== Green Bay Packers ==
In 1962 the reigning world champion Green Bay Packers drafted Green in the 14th round of the 1962 NFL draft. During training camp, they traded him to the Cleveland Browns where he would make a name for himself as one of the league's top running backs.

== Cleveland Browns ==
After seeing only limited action as a rookie in 1962, Green was installed in the Cleveland backfield the following year alongside legendary Hall of Famer Jim Brown. He finished his first full season of action with 526 rushing yards, and also caught 28 passes out of the backfield. Even more importantly, he also helped open holes for Brown to gain a then-NFL record 1,863 yards. In 1964, the two helped the Browns capture their fourth NFL championship, capping the year with a stunning 27–0 shutout of the Baltimore Colts at the 1964 NFL Championship Game.

Following Brown's retirement in July 1966, Green was switched from halfback to fullback and teamed with another future Hall of Famer, Leroy Kelly, to continue to give Cleveland one of the most dangerous backfield combinations in the NFL. He was selected to the Pro Bowl in each of the next two seasons, and was twice named an NFL All-Pro.

In August 1968, Green injured his knee during a preseason contest in Los Angeles and missed the next two months. On his return, he saw only limited action due to lingering problems with the knee. Just after the end of the season, he underwent surgery to repair torn cartilage in the troublesome knee but was then advised to retire. He followed that advice and accepted the Browns' offer to coach their running backs.

In his seven-year NFL career, he gained 3,204 yards and caught 179 passes out of the backfield.

== NFL career statistics ==
Legend
| | Won the NFL championship |
| **Bold** | Career high |

=== Regular season ===
| Year | Team | Games | | Rushing | | | | | Receiving | | | | |
| Year | Team | GP | GS | Att | Yds | Avg | Lng | TD | Rec | Yds | Avg | Lng | TD |
|---|---|---|---|---|---|---|---|---|---|---|---|---|---|
| 1962 | CLE | 13 | 4 | 31 | 139 | 4.5 | 45 | 0 | 17 | 194 | 11.4 | 65 | 1 |
| 1963 | CLE | 14 | 12 | 87 | 526 | **6.0** | **73** | 0 | 28 | 305 | 10.9 | 35 | 3 |
| 1964 | CLE | 14 | 14 | 109 | 491 | 4.5 | 37 | **6** | 25 | 283 | 11.3 | 32 | 4 |
| 1965 | CLE | 13 | 13 | 111 | 436 | 3.9 | 41 | 2 | 25 | 298 | **11.9** | **69** | 2 |
| 1966 | CLE | 14 | 14 | 144 | **750** | 5.2 | 35 | 3 | **45** | **445** | 9.9 | 31 | **6** |
| 1967 | CLE | 13 | 12 | **145** | 710 | 4.9 | 59 | 4 | 39 | 369 | 9.5 | 41 | 2 |
| 1968 | CLE | 8 | 7 | 41 | 152 | 3.7 | 14 | 0 | 16 | 142 | 8.9 | 62 | 2 |
| | | 89 | 76 | 668 | 3,204 | 4.8 | 73 | 15 | 195 | 2,036 | 10.4 | 69 | 20 |

=== Playoffs ===
| Year | Team | Games | | Rushing | | | | | Receiving | | | | |
| Year | Team | GP | GS | Att | Yds | Avg | Lng | TD | Rec | Yds | Avg | Lng | TD |
|---|---|---|---|---|---|---|---|---|---|---|---|---|---|
| 1964 | CLE | 1 | 1 | **10** | 29 | 2.9 | 9 | 0 | 0 | 0 | 0.0 | 0 | 0 |
| 1965 | CLE | 1 | 1 | 3 | 5 | 1.7 | 5 | 0 | 0 | 0 | 0.0 | 0 | 0 |
| 1967 | CLE | 1 | 1 | **10** | **49** | **4.9** | **24** | 0 | **3** | **18** | **6.0** | **15** | 0 |
| 1968 | CLE | 2 | 0 | 4 | 7 | 1.8 | 2 | **1** | 0 | 0 | 0.0 | 0 | 0 |
| | | 5 | 3 | 27 | 90 | 3.3 | 24 | 1 | 3 | 18 | 6.0 | 15 | 0 |

== Retirement and business interests ==
Green was Assistant Vice-President for Student Affairs at Case Western Reserve University from 1970 to 1974. He was Executive Director and Vice-President of IMG's Team Sports Division from 1974 to 1981. He left IMG to establish EG Industries (EGI) which originally manufactured components for the automotive industry in suburban Dayton, Ohio. Currently based in Columbus, Ohio, EGI branched out into parts for medical, consumer, energy and industrial devices. He has served on the board of directors of various enterprises including Eaton Corporation, Dayton Power & Light and the Duriron Company.

Green was inducted into the Kentucky Pro Football Hall of Fame in 2017.

== Breast cancer ==
Green was diagnosed with breast cancer in July 2005 after a small malignant lump was found in his chest. After obtaining a second opinion, he was treated with mastectomy in September 2005 by Dr. Robert Schenk, breast surgeon at University Hospitals of Cleveland's Case Medical Center. This was followed by eight chemotherapy sessions ending in March 2006. He then became a breast cancer activist, educating other men about the disease and how it can affect not only women but men as well. His two older sisters were diagnosed with breast cancer, and one of them succumbed to the disease.
