= Gary Collins (American football) =

American football player (born 1940)

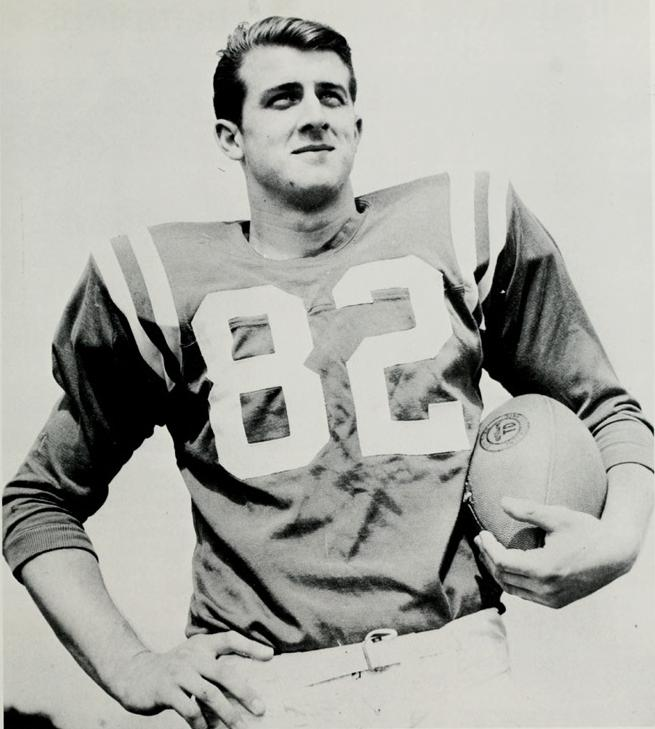
- Collins at Maryland in 1961

No. 86
- Positions: Wide receiver, punter

Personal information
- Born: August 20, 1940 (age 86); Williamstown, Pennsylvania, U.S.
- Listed height: 6 ft 4 in (1.93 m)
- Listed weight: 215 lb (98 kg)

Career information
- High school: Williamstown
- College: Maryland
- NFL draft: 1962: 1st round, 4th overall pick
- AFL draft: 1962: 1st round, 6th overall pick

Career history

Playing
- Cleveland Browns (1962–1971); Florida Blazers (1974)

Coaching
- Florida Blazers (1974) Receivers coach

Awards and highlights
- NFL champion (1964); Championship Game MVP (1964); 3× All-Pro (1965, 1966, 1969); 3× Pro Bowl (1965, 1966, 1969); NFL receiving touchdowns co-leader (1963); NFL 1960s All-Decade Team; Cleveland Browns Legends; Consensus All-American (1961); 2× First-team All-ACC (1960, 1961); Second-team All-ACC (1959)

Career NFL statistics
- Receptions: 331
- Receiving yards: 5,299
- Receiving touchdowns: 70
- Punts: 336
- Punt yards: 13,764
- Punting average: 41
- Stats at Pro Football Reference

Gary James Collins (born August 20, 1940) is an American former professional football player who was a wide receiver and punter for the Cleveland Browns of the National Football League (NFL) from 1962 to 1971. He played college football for the Maryland Terrapins.

== Early life ==
Born in Williamstown, Pennsylvania, Collins attended Williamstown High School and was recruited by the University of Maryland, College Park. During his three seasons (1959–61) with the Terrapins, he established a number of school records, and left his mark on the Atlantic Coast Conference record book as well. In 1961, he finished eighth in the Heisman Trophy balloting.

== Professional career ==
The Browns chose Collins with the fourth draft pick in the 1962 NFL draft and immediately made him the starting punter, while also using him as a reserve for veteran receiver Ray Renfro. In 1963, he moved into the starting lineup and led the team with 43 receptions and teamed with quarterback Frank Ryan to pace the league with 13 touchdowns catches. The latter mark broke a team record of nine, established by Dante Lavelli in 1947.

The following year, rookie Paul Warfield became Ryan's top receiver, but Collins developed a knack for coming through in the clutch. The first instance came in the season's second game, when he caught a fourth-down pass from Ryan to set up a go-ahead touchdown against the St. Louis Cardinals. Saving the best for last, Collins sparkled in the 1964 NFL championship game, when he was on the receiving end of three touchdown passes from Ryan and won the game's Most Valuable Player award in the 27–0 upset over the Baltimore Colts.

Building on the spectacular ending to that season, Collins followed with two more excellent campaigns in which he caught more than 50 passes and again finished in double digits in touchdown receptions. In 1965, he led the Browns with 50 receptions for 884 yards, and his average of 46.7 yards per punt topped the NFL. His 56 catches for 946 yards again led the team in 1966.

In 1967, Collins saw his numbers for both receiving and punting drop, but he made his second straight Pro Bowl appearance. The following year, Collins gave up his punting duties, but suffered a severe shoulder injury in the October 5 game against the Pittsburgh Steelers. The injury kept him out of action until the final week of the regular season and limited him to just nine receptions. While he made the most of those catches by averaging over 25 yards per grab, Collins caught no touchdown passes for the only time in his career.

Collins bounced back in 1969 with 54 catches and 11 touchdown receptions and helped the Browns reach the NFL Championship game for the fourth time in six seasons. In 1970, the punishing life of an NFL receiver began to catch up with him as he suffered from a number of rib injuries that limited him to 26 catches. In the team's December 12 game against the Dallas Cowboys, played in a driving rainstorm which turned the Cleveland Stadium surface into mud, a costly fumble by Collins after being hit in the ribs stopped a key drive and played a role in the team's 6–2 loss, a defeat that helped keep the team out of the postseason.

The ascension of new head coach Nick Skorich in 1971 eventually developed into a personality conflict between Collins and the new mentor. After just 15 receptions that year, Collins announced during the offseason that he would retire unless he was traded to either the Washington Redskins or New York Jets.

== Post-NFL career ==
When neither team was able to work out a deal, Collins retired and took an assistant coaching position with Lebanon Valley College in Annville, Pennsylvania. He signed as a player-coach with the WFL's Florida Blazers in 1974, but sustained a broken collarbone in preseason and saw only limited action later in the season, recording 3 catches. After then leaving football altogether, he worked as an insurance agent in Hershey, Pennsylvania, and did some broadcasting. Married in 1980, Collins has two children and four grandchildren.

== Legacy ==
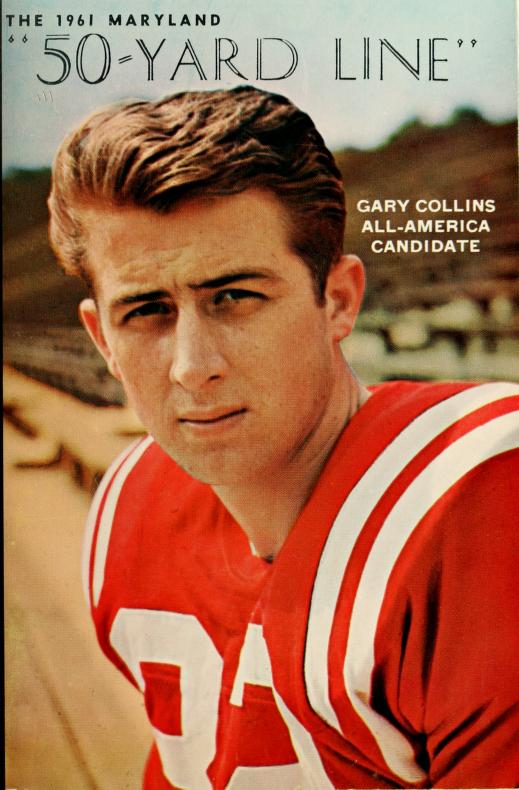
Collins on the cover of the 1961 Terrapins media guide

Collins retired with 339 receptions for 5,299 yards and 70 touchdowns. Collins was the sixth receiver to have 70 touchdowns in NFL history, behind Don Hutson, Don Maynard, Tommy McDonald, Lance Alworth, and Art Powell. Four of those five above Collins are in the Pro Football Hall of Fame. He did so while being 39th all-time in receiving yards and 31st in receptions. He remains the Browns' leader in career receiving touchdowns, and his reception total ranks second behind that of Ozzie Newsome. As a punter, he averaged 41.0 yards per attempt. He had 336 punts, 25th best upon retirement.

Those numbers have led some of Collins' supporters to launch a quiet campaign for election to the Pro Football Hall of Fame, citing the similarities between Collins' career numbers and those of Pittsburgh Steelers wideout Lynn Swann, as each had over 330 receptions with a yards per reception average of just over 16.0 yards.

Gary Collins is a member of The Pigskin Club Of Washington, D.C. National Collegiate All-American Football Players Honor Roll.

In 2016, the Professional Football Researchers Association named Collins to the PRFA Hall of Very Good Class of 2016.

== NFL career statistics ==
Legend
	Won the NFL championship
	Led the league
**Bold**	Career high

Year	Team	Games		Receiving					Punting				
Year	Team	GP	GS	Rec	Yds	Avg	Lng	TD	Pnt	Yds	Y/P	Lng	Blck
1962	CLE	**14**	0	11	153	13.9	29	2	45	1,926	42.8	64	0
1963	CLE	**14**	**14**	43	674	15.7	49	**13**	54	2,160	40.0	**73**	0
1964	CLE	**14**	**14**	35	544	15.5	43	8	48	2,016	42.0	58	0
1965	CLE	**14**	**14**	50	884	17.7	**67**	10	**65**	**3,035**	**46.7**	71	0
1966	CLE	**14**	**14**	**56**	**946**	16.9	54	12	57	2,223	39.0	60	0
1967	CLE	13	13	32	500	15.6	33	7	57	2,078	36.5	52	**2**
1968	CLE	5	4	9	230	**25.6**	39	0	2	52	26.0	28	0
1969	CLE	**14**	**14**	54	786	14.6	48	11	3	112	37.3	59	0
1970	CLE	12	11	26	351	13.5	28	4	–	–	–	–	–
1971	CLE	13	8	15	231	15.4	29	3	5	162	32.4	42	0
Career		127	106	331	5,299	16.0	67	70	336	13,764	41.0	73	2

== Other sources ==
- Grossi, Tony (2004). Tales from the Browns Sideline. (Champaign, Ill.): Sports Publishing LLC. ISBN 1-58261-713-9
- Stewart, Todd, ed. (2004) Cleveland Browns 2004 Media Guide. New York: National Communications Group.
- Carroll, Bob, et al. (1999) Total Football II. New York: HarperCollins. ISBN 0-06-270174-6.
