= 1964 Chicago Bears season =

NFL team season

- Owner: George Halas
- Head coach: George Halas
- Home stadium: Wrigley Field

Results
- Record: 5–9
- Division place: 6th Western
- Playoffs: Did not qualify

The 1964 Chicago Bears season was their 45th regular season completed in the National Football League. The team finished with a 5–9 record, earning them a sixth-place finish in the NFL Western Conference. It was a downfall from winning their eighth league title the previous December.

Running back Willie Galimore and wide receiver John Farrington were killed in an automobile accident on July 27; Galimore's Volkswagen left the road on a curve and rolled, a few miles from the team's training camp at St. Joseph's College in Rensselaer, Indiana.

== Roster ==
1964 Chicago Bears roster
Quarterbacks (QB): 12 Larry Rakestraw; 9 Billy Wade; Running backs (RB): 21 Jon Arnett; 29 Ronnie Bull; 35 Rick Casares; 48 Andy Livingston; 34 Joe Marconi; 22 Billy Martin; Wide receivers (WR): 86 Gary Barnes; 82 Rich Kreitling; 47 Johnny Morris; Tight ends (TE): 89 Mike Ditka; 85 Billy Martin	Offensive linemen (OL): 68 George Burman C/T; 72 Jim Cadile G; 67 Ted Karras G; 70 Herman Lee T; 50 Mike Pyle C; 64 Mike Rabold G; 63 Bob Wetoska T; Defensive linemen (DL): 81 Doug Atkins DE; 79 Dick Evey DE; 76 John Johnson DT; 78 Stan Jones DT; 74 Bob Kilcullen DE; 71 Earl Leggett DT	Linebackers (LB): 31 Joe Fortunato OLB; 83 Roger LeClerc K/MLB/OLB; 33 Larry Morris OLB; 53 Jim Purnell MLB; Defensive backs (DB): 25 J. C. Caroline CB; 43 Larry Glueck FS; 26 Bennie McRae CB; 17 Richie Petitbon SS; 27 John Sisk FS; 24 Rosey Taylor FS; 23 Dave Whitsell CB; Special teams (ST): 88 Bobby Joe Green P; 80 Bob Jencks K	Practice squad: Kelton Winston S; Reserve: 49 Charlie Bivins RB (IR); 10 Rudy Bukich QB (IR); 61 Bill George LB (IR); 87 Ed O'Bradovich DE (IR); 62 Mike Reilly LB (IR); Rookies in italics

== Schedule ==
Week	Date	Opponent	Result	Record	Venue	Attendance
1	September 13	at **Green Bay Packers**	**L** 12–23	0–1	City Stadium	42,327
2	September 20	at **Minnesota Vikings**	**W** 34–28	1–1	Metropolitan Stadium	41,387
3	September 27	at **Baltimore Colts**	**L** 0–52	1–2	Memorial Stadium	56,537
4	October 4	at **San Francisco 49ers**	**L** 21–31	1–3	Kezar Stadium	33,132
5	October 11	**Los Angeles Rams**	**W** 38–17	2–3	Wrigley Field	47,358
6	October 18	**Detroit Lions**	**L** 0–10	2–4	Wrigley Field	47,567
7	October 25	at Washington Redskins	**L** 20–27	2–5	D.C. Stadium	49,219
8	November 1	Dallas Cowboys	**L** 10–24	2–6	Wrigley Field	47,527
9	November 8	**Baltimore Colts**	**L** 24–40	2–7	Wrigley Field	47,891
10	November 15	at **Los Angeles Rams**	**W** 34–24	3–7	Los Angeles Memorial Coliseum	61,115
11	November 22	**San Francisco 49ers**	**W** 23–21	4–7	Wrigley Field	46,772
12	November 26	at **Detroit Lions**	**W** 27–24	5–7	Tiger Stadium	52,231
13	December 5	**Green Bay Packers**	**L** 3–17	5–8	Wrigley Field	43,636
14	December 13	**Minnesota Vikings**	**L** 14–41	5–9	Wrigley Field	46,486
Note: Intra-conference opponents are in **bold** text.

== Game summaries ==
=== Week 1 at Packers ===
Week One: Chicago Bears (0–0) at Green Bay Packers (0–0)

Quarter	1	2	3	4	Total
Bears	0	3	9	0	12
Packers	7	10	3	3	23

at City Stadium, Green Bay, Wisconsin

- Date: September 13, 1964
- Game weather: 53 °F (12 °C)
- Game attendance: 42,327
- Pro-Football-Reference.com

Game information

First quarter

- GB – Max McGee 11-yard pass from Bart Starr (Paul Hornung kick). Packers 7–0. Drive:

Second quarter

- CHI – Bob Jencks 8-yard field goal. Packers 7–3. Drive:
- GB – Tom Moore 33-yard pass from Bart Starr (Paul Hornung kick). Packers 14–3. Drive:
- GB – Paul Hornung 52-yard field goal. Packers 17–3. Drive:

Third quarter

- CHI – Bob Jencks 36-yard field goal. Packers 17–6. Drive:
- CHI – Mike Ditka 13-yard pass from Rudy Bukich (kick failed). Packers 17–12. Drive:
- GB – Paul Hornung 29-yard field goal. Packers 20–12. Drive:

Fourth quarter

- GB – Paul Hornung 20-yard field goal. Packers 23–12. Drive:

Top passers

- CHI – Rudy Bukich – 7/16, 83 yards, TD, 2 INT
- GB – Bart Starr – 8/16, 127 yards, 2 TD

Top rushers

- CHI – Ronnie Bull – 8 rushes, 25 yards
- GB – Jim Taylor – 16 rushes, 79 yards

Top receivers

- CHI – Mike Ditka – 7 receptions, 74 yards, TD
- GB – Ron Kramer – 3 receptions, 48 yards

=== Week 12 ===
Team	1	2	3	4	Total
• Bears	0	21	3	3	27
Lions	3	14	7	0	24

- Date: November 26
- Location: Tiger Stadium
- Game attendance: 52,231
- Game weather: 41 °F (5 °C); wind 13 mph

Scoring summary
Q1	DET	Walker 25 yard field goal	DET 3–0
Q2	CHI	Arnett 1 yard pass from Bukich (Jencks kick)	CHI 7–3
Q2	DET	Barr 13 yard pass from Plum (Walker kick)	DET 10–7
Q2	CHI	Marconi 5 yard pass from Bukich (Jencks kick)	CHI 14–10
Q2	CHI	Morris 16 yard pass from Bukich (Jencks kick)	CHI 21–10
Q2	DET	Gibbons 5 yard pass from Plum (Walker kick)	CHI 21–17
Q3	CHI	LeClerc 27 yard field goal	CHI 24–17
Q3	DET	Watkins 1 yard run (Walker kick)	Tie 24–24
Q4	CHI	LeClerc 17 yard field goal	CHI 27–24

== Standings ==
NFL Western Conference
	W	L	T	PCT	CONF	PF	PA	STK
Baltimore Colts	12	2	0	.857	10–2	428	225	W1
Green Bay Packers (Note: Green Bay was awarded the Playoff Bowl berth from the Western Conference by outscoring Minnesota 65–37 in their two meetings.)	8	5	1	.615	6–5–1	342	245	T1
Minnesota Vikings	8	5	1	.615	6–5–1	355	296	W3
Detroit Lions	7	5	2	.583	6–4–2	280	260	W2
Los Angeles Rams	5	7	2	.417	3–7–2	283	339	T1
Chicago Bears	5	9	0	.357	5–7	260	379	L2
San Francisco 49ers	4	10	0	.286	3–9	236	330	L1

Note: Tie games were not officially counted in the standings until 1972.
