= 1963 Chicago Bears season =

NFL team season

- Owner: George Halas
- General manager: George Halas, Jr.
- Head coach: George Halas
- Home stadium: Wrigley Field

Results
- Record: 11–1–2
- Division place: 1st Western
- Playoffs: Won NFL Championship (vs. Giants) 14–10

The 1963 Chicago Bears season was their 44th regular season and 12th post-season appearance in the National Football League. The team finished with an 11–1–2 record (the best of the 4th and final Halas era) to gain their first Western Conference championship since 1956, and the berth to host the NFL Championship Game against the New York Giants (11–3–0).

In the regular season, Chicago defeated the rival Green Bay Packers (11–2–1) twice to deny them the opportunity to play for a third consecutive NFL title; the Packers had won the previous five meetings with Chicago. In the championship game on December 29, the Bears defeated the Giants, 14–10, at Wrigley Field for the club's eighth league title, their first since 1946 and the last under head coach and founder George Halas.

This was the Bears' last playoff berth prior to the AFL–NFL merger, and their last NFL championship until 1985 and Super Bowl XX. The Bears' defense in 1963 was the third in history to lead the NFL in fewest rushing yards, fewest passing yards, and fewest total yards; the defense also allowed only 144 points, formerly an NFL record.

In 2007, ESPN.com ranked the 1963 Bears as the ninth-greatest defense in NFL history, noting, "[i]n 1963, Bears defensive coach George Allen came up with a new zone defense against the pass, befuddling opponents. With Doug Atkins and Ed O'Bradovich pressuring opposing QBs from their defensive end slots, and Bill George and Larry Morris defending against short passes from the linebacker position, the Bears picked off 36 passes, and allowed just 10.3 points and 227 yards per game. The Bears went on to win the NFL championship, thanks to the Defense. In the title game against Y. A. Tittle and the Giants, who had the best offense in the NFL, Chicago's five picks were the key, as the Bears won 14–10. George Allen got the game ball."

== Offseason ==
=== NFL draft ===
1963 Chicago Bears draft
Round	Pick	Player	Position	College	Notes
1	11	Dave Behrman	C	Michigan State	Pick from trade with PIT
2	20	Steve Barnett	T	Oregon	Pick from trade with DAL
2	25	Bob Jencks	E	Miami (OH)	
3	38	Larry Glueck	DB	Villanova	
4	49	Stan Sanders	E	Whittier	Pick from trade with SF
4	52	Charley Mitchell	HB	Washington	Pick from trade with PIT
6	80	John Johnson	T	Indiana	Pick from trade with PIT
6	81	Dave Mathieson	QB	Washington State	
7	94	Paul Underhill	B	Missouri	
8	109	Dennis Harmon	DB	Southern Illinois	
9	118	Monte Day	T	Fresno State	Pick from trade with DAL
9	122	Dave Watson	LB	Georgia Tech	
10	137	Ed Hoerster	LB	Notre Dame	
11	150	James Tullis	DB	Florida A&M	
12	165	Dick Drummond	B	George Washington	
13	178	John Szumcyk	B	Trinity (CT)	
14	193	Gordan Banks	B	Fisk	
15	206	Bob Dentel	C/LB	Miami (FL)	
16	221	Lowell Caylor	DB	Miami (OH)	
17	234	John Sisk	B	Miami (FL)	
18	249	Jeff Slabaugh	E	Indiana	
19	262	Bob Yaksick	DB	Rutgers	
20	277	John Gregory	E	Baldwin-Wallace	
Made roster † Pro Football Hall of Fame * Made at least one Pro Bowl during career

== Personnel ==
=== Coaches ===
- Head coach – George Halas
- Assistants – George Allen (Defensive Coordinator), Jim Dooley, Phil Handler, Luke Johnsos, Sid Luckman, Chuck Mather

=== Roster ===
1963 Chicago Bears roster
Quarterbacks (QB): 10 Rudy Bukich; 9 Billy Wade; Running backs (RB): 49 Charlie Bivins; 29 Ronnie Bull; 28 Willie Galimore; 34 Joe Marconi; 22 Billy Martin; Wide receivers (WR): 46 Angelo Coia; 84 Bo Farrington; 47 Johnny Morris; Tight ends (TE): 89 Mike Ditka	Offensive linemen (OL): 73 Steve Barnett T; 72 Jim Cadile G; 60 Roger Davis G; 67 Ted Karras G; 70 Herman Lee T; 50 Mike Pyle C; 63 Bob Wetoska T; Defensive linemen (DL): 81 Doug Atkins DE; 76 John Johnson DT; 78 Stan Jones DT; 74 Bob Kilcullen DE; 87 Ed O'Bradovich DE; 75 Fred Williams DT	Linebackers (LB): 65 Tom Bettis MLB; 31 Joe Fortunato OLB; 61 Bill George MLB; 83 Roger LeClerc K/OLB; 33 Larry Morris OLB; Defensive backs (DB): 25 J. C. Caroline CB; 43 Larry Glueck FS; 26 Bennie McRae CB; 17 Richie Petitbon SS; 24 Rosey Taylor FS; 23 Dave Whitsell CB; Special teams (ST): 88 Bobby Joe Green P; 80 Bob Jencks K	Reserve: 35 Rick Casares RB (IR); 71 Earl Leggett DT (IR); 64 Mike Rabold G (IR); 48 Tommy Neck S (IR); 82 Maury Youmans DE (IR); Rookies in italics

- Team photo
- Rosters - 1963 NFL title game

== Preseason ==
=== Schedule ===
Week	Date	Time (CT)	Opponent	Result	Record	Venue	TV	Attendance	Recap
1	August 10		vs. New York Giants (at Ithaca, NY)	W 17–7	1–0	South Hill Field			
2	August 15		at Washington Redskins	W 28–26	2–0	D.C. Stadium			
3	August 24	7:55 p.m.	vs. Green Bay Packers (at Milwaukee, WI)	L 7–26	2–1	Milwaukee County Stadium	WBBM-TV	44,592	
4	August 31		St. Louis Cardinals	L 3–7	2–2	Soldier Field			
5	September 7		Baltimore Colts (at New Orleans, LA)	W 14–7	3–2	Tulane Stadium			

== Regular season ==
=== Schedule ===
Week	Date	Opponent	Result	Record	Venue	Attendance	Recap
1	September 15	at **Green Bay Packers**	**W** 10–3	1–0	City Stadium	42,327	
2	September 22	at **Minnesota Vikings**	**W** 28–7	2–0	Metropolitan Stadium	33,923	
3	September 29	at **Detroit Lions**	**W** 37–21	3–0	Tiger Stadium	55,400	
4	October 6	**Baltimore Colts**	**W** 10–3	4–0	Wrigley Field	48,998	
5	October 13	at **Los Angeles Rams**	**W** 52–14	5–0	Los Angeles Memorial Coliseum	40,476	
6	October 20	at **San Francisco 49ers**	**L** 14–20	5–1	Kezar Stadium	35,837	
7	October 27	Philadelphia Eagles	**W** 16–7	6–1	Wrigley Field	48,514	
8	November 3	at **Baltimore Colts**	**W** 17–7	7–1	Memorial Stadium	60,065	
9	November 10	**Los Angeles Rams**	**W** 6–0	8–1	Wrigley Field	48,312	
10	November 17	**Green Bay Packers**	**W** 26–7	9–1	Wrigley Field	49,166	
11	November 24	at Pittsburgh Steelers	**T** 17–17	9–1–1	Forbes Field	36,465	
12	December 1	**Minnesota Vikings**	**T** 17–17	9–1–2	Wrigley Field	47,249	
13	December 8	**San Francisco 49ers**	**W** 27–7	10–1–2	Wrigley Field	46,994	
14	December 15	**Detroit Lions**	**W** 24–14	11–1–2	Wrigley Field	45,317	
Note: Intra-conference opponents are in **bold** text.

=== Game summaries ===
==== Week 1 (Sunday, September 15, 1963): at Green Bay Packers ====
Week 1: Chicago Bears at Green Bay Packers – Game summary

Quarter	1	2	3	4	Total
Bears (1–0)	3	0	7	0	**10**
Packers (0–1)	3	0	0	0	**3**

at City Stadium • Green Bay, Wisconsin

- Date: September 15, 1963
- Game time: 1:00 p.m. CDT
- Game weather: 54 °F (12 °C), relative humidity 76%, wind 7 mph
- Game attendance: 42,327
- Referee: Art McNally
- TV: CBS

Team	Category	Player	Statistics
CHI	Passing	Bill Wade	18/24, 129 YDS, 1 INT
CHI	Rushing	Rick Casares	5 CAR, 27 YDS
CHI	Receiving	Ronnie Bull	6 REC, 48 YDS
GB	Passing	Bart Starr	11/22, 83 YDS, 4 INTs
GB	Rushing	Jim Taylor	12 CAR, 53 YDS
GB	Receiving	Ron Kramer	3 REC, 35 YDS

Scoring summary

Quarter	Time	Drive			Team	Scoring information	Score	
Quarter	Time	Plays	Yards	TOP	Team	Scoring information	CHI	GB
1					Bears	32-yard field goal by Jencks	3	0
1					Packers	41-yard field goal by Kramer	3	3
3					Bears	Marconi 1-yard touchdown run, Jencks kick good	10	3
"TOP" = time of possession. For other American football terms, see Glossary of American football.							10	3

- Point spread: Bears +11
- Time of game:

Bears	Game statistics	Packers
15	First downs	9
35–107	Rushes–yards	21–77
129	Passing yards	83
18–24–1	Passes	11–22–4
1–5	Sacked–yards	1–10
124	Net passing yards	73
231	Total yards	150
84	Return yards	101
5–43.8	Punts	5–48.6
1–1	Fumbles–lost	1–1
5–50	Penalties–yards	6–58

Individual stats

Bears Passing
	C/ATT^{1}	Yds	TD	INT	Sk	Yds	LG^{3}	Rate
Wade	18/24	129	0	1	1	5	22	69.6

Bears Rushing
	Car^{2}	Yds	TD	LG^{3}
Casares	5	27	0	13
Wade	8	26	0	12
Bull	12	23	0	10
Marconi	9	23	1	9
Galimore	1	8	0	8

Bears Receiving
	Rec^{4}	Yds	TD	LG^{3}
Bull	6	48	0	22
Marconi	4	27	0	16
Casares	4	11	0	4
Farrington	1	15	0	15
Morris	1	15	0	15
Ditka	1	12	0	12
Galimore	1	1	0	1

Bears Kick Returns
	Ret	Yds	Y/Rt	TD	Lng
Marconi	1	15	15.0	0	15
Casares	1	10	10/0	0	10

Bears Punt Returns
	Ret	Yds	Y/Rt	TD	Lng
Taylor	2	19	9.5	0	0
Morris	2	12	6.0	0	0

Bears Punting
	Pnt	Yds	Y/P	Lng	Blck
Green	5	219	43.8		

Bears Kicking
	XPM–XPA	FGM–FGA	MFG
Jencks	1–1	1–2	

Bears Interceptions
	Int	Yds	TD	LG	PD
Petitbon	1	19	0	19	
Taylor	1	5	0	5	
George	1	4	0	4	
Whitsell	1	0	0	0	

==== Week 2 (Sunday, September 22, 1963): at Minnesota Vikings ====
Week 2: Chicago Bears at Minnesota Vikings – Game summary

Quarter	1	2	3	4	Total
Bears (2–0)	7	7	0	14	**28**
Vikings (1–1)	0	7	0	0	**7**

at Metropolitan Stadium • Bloomington, Minnesota

- Date: September 22, 1963
- Game time: 1:30 p.m. CDT
- Game weather: 51 °F (11 °C), relative humidity 78%, wind 9 mph
- Game attendance: 33,923
- Referee: Harry Brubaker
- TV: CBS

Team	Category	Player	Statistics
CHI	Passing	Bill Wade	23/32, 253 YDS, 3 TDs
CHI	Rushing	Ronnie Bull	14 CAR, 53 YDS
CHI	Receiving	Mike Ditka	8 REC, 124 YDS, 2 TDs
MIN	Passing	Fran Tarkenton	13/22, 167 YDS, 1 TD, 3 INTs
MIN	Rushing	Tommy Mason	11 CAR, 60 YDS
MIN	Receiving	Ray Poage	5 REC, 67 YDS

Scoring summary

Quarter	Time	Drive			Team	Scoring information	Score	
Quarter	Time	Plays	Yards	TOP	Team	Scoring information	CHI	MIN
1					Bears	Bull 24-yard touchdown reception from Wade, Jencks kick good	7	0
2					Vikings	Reichlow 24-yard touchdown reception from Tarkenton, Cox kick good	14	7
2					Bears	Ditka 36-yard touchdown reception from Wade, Jencks kick good	14	7
4					Bears	Wade 1-yard touchdown run, Jencks kick good	21	7
4					Bears	Ditka 10-yard touchdown reception from Wade, Jencks kick good	28	7
"TOP" = time of possession. For other American football terms, see Glossary of American football.							28	7

- Point spread: Bears –4
- Time of game:

Bears	Game statistics	Vikings
24	First downs	20
27–106	Rushes–yards	34–152
253	Passing yards	197
23–33–0	Passes	16–27–3
0–0	Sacked–yards	2–23
253	Net passing yards	174
359	Total yards	326
34	Return yards	85
1–44.0	Punts	2–35.0
1–1	Fumbles–lost	4–2
8–75	Penalties–yards	5–55

==== Week 3 at Lions ====
Week Three: Chicago Bears (2–0) at Detroit Lions (1–1)

Quarter	1	2	3	4	Total
**Bears**	7	28	0	2	**37**
Lions	0	0	14	7	**21**

at Tiger Stadium, Detroit, Michigan

- Date: September 29, 1963
- Game weather: 54 °F (12 °C)
- Game attendance: 55,400
- Box Score

Game information

**First quarter**

- CHI – Angelo Coia 18-yard pass from Bill Wade (Bob Jencks kick). Bears 7–0.

**Second quarter**

- CHI – Johnny Morris 16-yard pass from Bill Wade (Bob Jencks kick). Bears 14–0.
- CHI – Mike Ditka 13-yard pass from Bill Wade (Bob Jencks kick). Bears 21–0.
- CHI – Richie Petitbon 66-yard interception return (Bob Jencks kick). Bears 28–0.
- CHI – Bill Wade 1-yard run (Bob Jencks kick). Bears 35–0.

**Third quarter**

- DET – Terry Barr 60-yard pass from Earl Morrall (Wayne Walker kick). Bears 35–7.
- DET – Gail Cogdill 67-yard pass from Earl Morrall (Wayne Walker kick). Bears 35–14.

**Fourth quarter**

- CHI – Safety, Earl Morrall tackled by Doug Atkins in end zone. Bears 37–14.
- DET – Gail Cogdill 38-yard pass from Earl Morrall (Wayne Walker kick). Bears 37–21.

Top passers

- CHI – Bill Wade – 18/34, 219 yards, 3 TD, INT
- DET – Earl Morrall – 8/21, 229 yards, 3 TD, INT

Top rushers

- CHI – Joe Marconi – 9 rushes, 30 yards
- DET – Nick Pietrosante – 8 rushes, 12 yards

Top receivers

- CHI – Johnny Morris – 6 receptions, 85 yards, TD
- DET – Gail Cogdill – 4 receptions, 119 yards, 2 TD

==== Week 4 vs Colts ====
Week Four: Baltimore Colts (1–2) at Chicago Bears (3–0)

Quarter	1	2	3	4	Total
Colts	0	0	3	0	**3**
**Bears**	0	0	0	10	**10**

at Wrigley Field, Chicago, Illinois

- Date: October 6, 1963
- Game weather: 73 °F (23 °C)
- Game attendance: 48,998
- Box Score

Game information

**First quarter**

- No scoring

**Second quarter**

- No scoring

**Third quarter**

- BAL – Jim Martin 16-yard field goal. Colts 3–0.

**Fourth quarter**

- CHI – Ronnie Bull 44-yard pass from Rudy Bukich (Bob Jencks kick). Bears 7–3.
- CHI – Roger LeClerc 16-yard field goal. Bears 10–3.

Top passers

- BAL – Johnny Unitas – 21/36, 182 yards, INT
- CHI – Rudy Bukich – 6/7, 112 yards, TD

Top rushers

- BAL – J.W. Lockett – 10 rushes, 13 yards
- CHI – Rick Casares – 7 rushes, 54 yards

Top receivers

- BAL – Tom Matte – 7 receptions, 56 yards
- CHI – Ronnie Bull – 2 receptions, 44 yards, TD

==== Week 5 ====
Team	1	2	3	4	Total
• Bears	7	21	3	21	52
Rams	0	7	0	7	14

- Date: October 13
- Location: Los Angeles Memorial Coliseum
- Game weather: 66 °F (19 °C); wind 9 mph

Scoring summary
Q1	CHI	Ditka 13 yard pass from Wade (Jencks kick)	CHI 7–0
Q2	CHI	McRae 35 yard interception return (Jencks kick)	CHI 14–0
Q2	LA	Phillips 10 yard pass from Bratkowski (Villanueva kick)	CHI 14–7
Q2	CHI	Ditka 25 yard pass from Wade (Jencks kick)	CHI 21–7
Q2	CHI	Ditka 2 yard pass from Wade (Jencks kick)	CHI 28–7
Q3	CHI	LeClerc 31 yard field goal	CHI 31–7
Q4	LA	Bass 4 yard run (Villanueva kick)	CHI 31–14
Q4	CHI	Ditka 14 yard pass from Wade (Jencks kick)	CHI 38–14
Q4	CHI	Galimore 2 yard run (Jencks kick)	CHI 45–14
Q4	CHI	Farrington 17 yard pass from Bukich (Jencks kick)	CHI 52–14

- Mike Ditka 9 Rec, 110 Yds

==== Week 6 ====
Team	1	2	3	4	Total
Bears	0	7	0	7	14
• 49ers	10	7	3	0	20

- Date: October 20
- Location: Kezar Stadium

==== Week 7 ====
Team	1	2	3	4	Total
Eagles	0	7	0	0	7
• Bears	10	0	6	0	16

- Date: October 27
- Location: Wrigley Field

==== Week 8 ====
Team	1	2	3	4	Total
• Bears	7	0	7	3	17
Colts	0	0	7	0	7

- Date: November 3
- Location: Memorial Stadium

==== Week 9 ====
Team	1	2	3	4	Total
Rams	0	0	0	0	0
• Bears	3	0	3	0	6

- Date: November 10
- Location: Wrigley Field

==== Week 10 (Sunday, November 17, 1963): vs. Green Bay Packers ====
Week 10: Green Bay Packers at Chicago Bears – Game summary

Quarter	1	2	3	4	Total
Packers (8–2)	0	0	0	7	**7**
Bears (9–1)	13	0	3	10	**26**

at Wrigley Field • Chicago, Illinois

- Date: November 17, 1963
- Game time: 1:00 p.m. CST
- Game weather: 62 °F (17 °C), relative humidity 74%, wind 16 mph
- Game attendance: 49,166
- Referee: Tom Bell
- TV: CBS

Team	Category	Player	Statistics
GB	Passing	John Roach	8/20, 92 YDS, 2 INTs
GB	Rushing	Tom Moore	12 CAR, 50 YDS, 1 TD
GB	Receiving	Max McGee	3 REC, 93 YDS
CHI	Passing	Bill Wade	6/14, 92 YDS
CHI	Rushing	Willie Galimore	14 CAR, 79 YDS, 1 TD
CHI	Receiving	Mike Ditka	2 REC, 32 YDS

Scoring summary

Quarter	Time	Drive			Team	Scoring information	Score	
Quarter	Time	Plays	Yards	TOP	Team	Scoring information	GB	CHI
1					Bears	29-yard field goal by LeClerc	0	3
1					Bears	46-yard field goal by LeClerc	0	6
1					Bears	Galimore 27-yard touchdown run, Jencks kick good	0	13
3					Bears	19-yard field goal by LeClerc	0	16
4					Bears	35-yard field goal by LeClerc	0	19
4					Bears	Wade 5-yard touchdown run, Jencks kick good	0	26
4					Packers	Moore 11-yard touchdown run, Kramer kick good	7	26
"TOP" = time of possession. For other American football terms, see Glossary of American football.							7	26

- Point spread: Bears +4
- Time of game:

Packers	Game statistics	Bears
16	First downs	19
20–71	Rushes–yards	57–248
178	Passing yards	92
11–30–5	Passes	6–14–0
2–17	Sacked–yards	3–23
161	Net passing yards	69
232	Total yards	317
101	Return yards	63
5–38.8	Punts	3–47.0
2–2	Fumbles–lost	0–0
6–65	Penalties–yards	11–97

Individual stats

Bears Passing
	C/ATT^{1}	Yds	TD	INT	Sk	Yds	LG^{3}	Rate
Wade	6/14	92	0	0	3	23	28	65.2

Bears Rushing
	Car^{2}	Yds	TD	LG^{3}
Galimore	14	79	1	27
Marconi	14	52	0	9
Casares	11	44	0	7
Bull	4	30	0	14
Wade	4	28	1	3
Bivins	8	15	0	10
Bukich	1	2	0	2
Coia	1	–2	0	–2

Bears Receiving
	Rec^{4}	Yds	TD	LG^{3}
Ditka	2	32	0	16
Coia	2	26	0	14
Marconi	1	28	0	28
Casares	1	6	0	6

Bears Kick Returns
	Ret	Yds	Y/Rt	TD	Lng
Pyle	1	0	0.0	0	0

Bears Punting
	Pnt	Yds	Y/P	Lng	Blck
Green	3	141	47.0	0	

Bears Kicking
	XPM–XPA	FGM–FGA	MFG
LeClerc		4–7	
Jencks	2–2		

Bears Interceptions
	Int	Yds	TD	LG	PD
Taylor	2	8	0	0	
McRae	1	44	0	44	
Petitbon	1	11	0	11	
Whitsell	1	0	0	0	

==== Week 11 ====
Team	1	2	3	4	Total
Bears	7	7	0	3	17
Steelers	0	14	0	3	17

- Date: November 24
- Location: Forbes Field

==== Week 12 (Sunday, December 1, 1963): vs. Minnesota Vikings ====
Week 12: Minnesota Vikings at Chicago Bears – Game summary

Quarter	1	2	3	4	Total
Vikings (4–7–1)	3	14	0	0	**17**
Bears (9–1–2)	3	0	7	7	**17**

at Wrigley Field • Chicago, Illinois

- Date: December 1, 1963
- Game time: 1:00 p.m. CST
- Game weather: 23 °F (−5 °C), relative humidity 72%, wind 10 mph, wind chill 13 °F (−11 °C)
- Game attendance: 47,249
- Referee: Tony Skover
- TV: CBS

Team	Category	Player	Statistics
MIN	Passing	Ron Vander Kelen	5/9, 116 YDS, 1 TD, 1 INT
MIN	Rushing	Tommy Mason	19, CAR, 53 YDS
MIN	Receiving	Gordon Smith	2 REC, 83 YDS, 1 TD
CHI	Passing	Bill Wade	16/32, 164 YDS, 1 TD
CHI	Rushing	Ronnie Bull	14 CAR, 31 YDS
CHI	Receiving	Mike Ditka	5 REC, 76 YDS

Scoring summary

Quarter	Time	Drive			Team	Scoring information	Score	
Quarter	Time	Plays	Yards	TOP	Team	Scoring information	MIN	CHI
1					Vikings	16-yard field goal by Cox	3	3
1					Bears	16-yard field goal by LeClerc	3	3
2					Vikings	Wilson 2-yard touchdown run, Cox kick good	10	3
2					Vikings	Smith 53-yard touchdown reception from Vander Kelen, Cox kick good	17	3
3					Bears	Wade 1-yard touchdown run, Jencks kick good	17	10
4					Bears	Marconi 8-yard touchdown reception from Wade, Jencks kick good	17	17
"TOP" = time of possession. For other American football terms, see Glossary of American football.							17	17

- Point spread: Bears –13
- Time of game:

Vikings	Game statistics	Bears
9	First downs	15
38–116	Rushes–yards	33–67
120	Passing yards	164
6–13–1	Passes	16–32–0
4–34	Sacked–yards	1–10
86	Net passing yards	154
202	Total yards	221
142	Return yards	93
4–15.7	Punts	7–52.4
4–3	Fumbles–lost	4–3
3–26	Penalties–yards	3–25

==== Week 13 ====
Team	1	2	3	4	Total
49ers	0	7	0	0	7
• Bears	14	0	7	6	27

- Date: December 8
- Location: Wrigley Field

==== Week 14 ====
Team	1	2	3	4	Total
Lions	0	7	0	0	7
• Bears	3	0	14	7	24

- Date: December 15
- Location: Wrigley Field

== Standings ==
NFL Western Conference
	W	L	T	PCT	CONF	PF	PA	STK
Chicago Bears	11	1	2	.917	10–1–1	301	144	W2
Green Bay Packers	11	2	1	.846	9–2–1	369	206	W2
Baltimore Colts	8	6	0	.571	7–5	316	285	W3
Detroit Lions	5	8	1	.385	4–7–1	326	265	L1
Minnesota Vikings	5	8	1	.385	4–7–1	309	390	W1
Los Angeles Rams	5	9	0	.357	5–7	210	350	L2
San Francisco 49ers	2	12	0	.143	1–11	198	391	L5

Note: Tie games were not officially counted in the standings until 1972.

== NFL Championship ==
Team	1	2	3	4	Total
Giants	7	3	0	0	10
• Bears	7	0	7	0	14

- Date: December 29
- Location: Wrigley Field
- Game attendance: 45,801
- Game weather: 4 °F (−16 °C); wind 11 mph
- Referee: Norm Schachter
- TV announcers (NBC): Jack Brickhouse, Chris Schenkel & George Connor

Scoring summary
Q1	7:38	NYG	Gifford 14 yard pass from Tittle (Chandler kick)	NYG 7–0
Q1	0:16	CHI	Wade 2 yard run (Jencks kick)	Tie 7–7
Q2	9:49	NYG	Chandler 13 yard field goal	NYG 10–7
Q3	2:12	CHI	Wade 1 yard run (Jencks kick)	CHI 14–10

The Giants opened the scoring in the first quarter when quarterback Y. A. Tittle led New York on an 83-yard drive that was capped off by a 14-yard touchdown pass to Frank Gifford. The drive was set up by Bears quarterback Bill Wade's fumble deep in Giants territory, which was recovered by former Bear Erich Barnes. However, later in the first period, Tittle suffered an injury to his left knee when Larry Morris hit him during his throwing motion. For the rest of the game, Tittle would never be the same. Morris then intercepted Tittle's screen pass and returned the ball 61 yards to the Giants' 6-yard line. Two plays later, Wade scored a touchdown on a two-yard quarterback sneak to tie the game at 7.

In the second quarter, the Giants retook the lead, 10–7, on a 13-yard field goal. But on New York's next drive, Tittle re-injured his left knee on another hit by Morris. With Tittle out for two possessions, the Giants struggled, only able to advance 2 yards in 7 plays. New York coach Allie Sherman even punted on third down, showing no confidence in backup Glynn Griffing. However, the score remained 10–7 at halftime.

Tittle came back in the third period, but due to his injury, he was forced to throw off his back foot. An interception on a screen pass by the Bears' Ed O'Bradovich was brought deep into Giants territory, setting up Wade's 1-yard touchdown to give Chicago a 14–10 lead. The score held up, and the Bears iced the game on Richie Petitbon's interception in the end zone with 10 seconds left. It was Tittle's 5th interception. At the end of the game, defensive coordinator George Allen was given the game ball due to his defense's spectacular play.

After the game the Bears received the traveling Ed Thorp Memorial Trophy for the first time since 1946, and for the fifth and final time throughout its existence. They also received an additional trophy Chicago's Mayor Richard M. Daley named after recently assassinated John F. Kennedy, which is still on display at Halas Hall.
