= 1966 Chicago Bears season =

NFL team season

- Owner: George Halas
- General manager: George Halas
- Head coach: George Halas
- Home stadium: Wrigley Field

Results
- Record: 5–7–2
- Division place: 5th Western
- Playoffs: Did not qualify

The 1966 season was the Chicago Bears' 47th in the National Football League. The team failed to improve on their 9–5 record from 1965 and finished with a 5–7–2 record under head coach George Halas, earning them a fifth-place finish in the NFL Western Conference. This was the franchise's second losing season in the past three.

== Offseason ==
=== NFL draft ===
1966 Chicago Bears draft
Round	Pick	Player	Position	College	Notes
1	12	George Rice	Defensive tackle	LSU	
2	44	Charlie Brown	Safety	Syracuse	
3	44	Bob Pickens	Offensive tackle	Nebraska	
4	51	Randy Jackson	Offensive tackle	Florida	
4	60	Doug Buffone	Linebacker	Louisville	
6	85	Dennis Brewster	Guard	BYU	
6	92	Frank McRae	Defensive tackle	Tennessee State	
7	107	Ron Meyer	Quarterback	South Dakota State	
8	122	Doug McFalls	Safety	Georgia	
9	137	Fritz Greenlee	Wide receiver	Northern Arizona	
10	152	Bobby Burnett	Running back	Arkansas	
11	167	Terry Owens	Offensive tackle	Jacksonville State	
12	182	Wayne Page	Defensive end	Clemson	
13	197	Wayne Becker	Tackle	Montana	
14	212	Mike Buckner	Defensive back	Northwestern	
15	227	Jim Kollman	Guard	Oregon	
16	242	Lynn Senkbeil	Linebacker	Nebraska	
17	257	Curt Gentry	Cornerback	Maryland Eastern Shore	
18	272	Charley Kines	Offensive tackle	Michigan	
19	287	Roger Haberer	Running back	Eastern Illinois	
20	302	Goldie Sellers	Wide receiver	Grambling	
Made roster

=== Undrafted free agents ===
1966 undrafted free agents of note
Player	Position	College
Tom Cruickshank	Defensive back	Utah State
Ron Kupisch	Linebacker	Illinois

== Roster ==
Chicago Bears 1966 roster
Quarterbacks: 10 Rudy Bukich; 12 Larry Rakestraw; 9 Billy Wade; Running backs: 21 Jon Arnett; 29 Ronnie Bull; 32 Ralph Kurek; 41 Brian Piccolo; 40 Gale Sayers; Wide receivers: 45 Dick Gordon; 80 Jimmy Jones; Tight ends: 85 Duane Allen; 49 Charlie Bivins; 89 Mike Ditka	Offensive linemen: 72 Jim Cadile G; 70 Herman Lee T; 75 Riley Mattson T; 50 Mike Pyle C; 64 Mike Rabold G; 67 George Seals G; 63 Bob Wetoska T; Defensive linemen: 81 Doug Atkins DE; 73 Frank Cornish DT; 79 Dick Evey DT; 76 John Johnson DT; 74 Bob Kilcullen DT; 87 Ed O'Bradovich DE; 60 Brian Schweda DE	Linebackers: 55 Doug Buffone OLB; 51 Dick Butkus MLB; 31 Joe Fortunato OLB; 53 Jim Purnell OLB; 62 Mike Reilly MLB; Defensive backs: 22 Charlie Brown SS; 46 Curt Gentry CB; 26 Bennie McRae CB; 17 Richie Petitbon SS; 24 Roosevelt Taylor FS; 23 Dave Whitsell CB; Special teams: 88 Bobby Joe Green P; 83 Roger LeClerc K/C	Taxi squad: 68 Dennis Brewster DE; 65 Randy Jackson T; 59 Rudy Kuechenberg LB; 44 Doug McFalls S; 58 Frank McRae DT; Reserve List: 47 Johnny Morris WR (IR); 48 Andy Livingston RB (IR)

== Schedule ==
Week	Date	Opponent	Result	Record	Venue	Attendance
1	September 11	at **Detroit Lions**	**L** 3–14	0–1	Tiger Stadium	52,225
2	September 16	at **Los Angeles Rams**	**L** 17–31	0–2	Los Angeles Memorial Coliseum	58,916
3	Bye					
4	October 2	at **Minnesota Vikings**	**W** 13–10	1–2	Metropolitan Stadium	47,426
5	October 9	**Baltimore Colts**	**W** 27–17	2–2	Wrigley Field	47,452
6	October 16	**Green Bay Packers**	**L** 0–17	2–3	Wrigley Field	48,573
7	October 23	**Los Angeles Rams**	**W** 17–10	3–3	Wrigley Field	47,475
8	October 31	at St. Louis Cardinals	**L** 17–24	3–4	Busch Memorial Stadium	49,516
9	November 6	**Detroit Lions**	**T** 10–10	3–4–1	Wrigley Field	47,041
10	November 13	**San Francisco 49ers**	**T** 30–30	3–4–2	Wrigley Field	47,078
11	November 20	at **Green Bay Packers**	**L** 6–13	3–5–2	Lambeau Field	50,861
12	November 27	Atlanta Falcons	**W** 23–6	4–5–2	Wrigley Field	44,777
13	December 4	at **Baltimore Colts**	**L** 16–21	4–6–2	Memorial Stadium	60,238
14	December 11	at **San Francisco 49ers**	**L** 14–41	4–7–2	Kezar Stadium	37,170
15	December 18	**Minnesota Vikings**	**W** 41–28	5–7–2	Wrigley Field	45,191
Note: Intra-conference opponents are in **bold** text.

- A bye week was necessary in 1966, as the league expanded to an odd-number (15) of teams (Atlanta); one team was idle each week.

== Standings ==
NFL Western Conference
	W	L	T	PCT	CONF	PF	PA	STK
Green Bay Packers	12	2	0	.857	10–2	335	163	W5
Baltimore Colts	9	5	0	.643	7–5	314	226	W1
Los Angeles Rams	8	6	0	.571	6–6	289	212	L1
San Francisco 49ers	6	6	2	.500	5–5–2	320	325	L1
Chicago Bears	5	7	2	.417	4–6–2	234	272	W1
Detroit Lions	4	9	1	.308	3–8–1	206	317	L3
Minnesota Vikings	4	9	1	.308	4–7–1	292	304	L1

Note: Tie games were not officially counted in the standings until 1972.

== Game summaries ==
=== Week 4: vs. Baltimore Colts ===
Quarter	1	2	3	4	Total
Colts	0	3	7	7	17
Bears	10	0	10	7	27

at Wrigley Field in Chicago, Illinois

- Date: Sunday, October 9, 1966
- Game weather: 67 °F (19 °C), wind 12 mph (19 km/h)
- Pro-Football-Reference.com

Game information

First Quarter

- CHI – Roger LeClerc 42-yard field goal – Bears 3–0
- CHI – Joe Fortunato 24-yard fumble return (Roger LeClerc kick) – Bears 10–0

Second Quarter

- BAL – Lou Michaels 13-yard field goal – Bears 10–3

Third Quarter

- CHI – Gale Sayers 30-yard run (Roger LeClerc kick) – Bears 17–3
- CHI – Roger LeClerc 27-yard field goal – Bears 20–3
- BAL – Bobby Boyd 37-yard interception return (Lou Michaels kick) – Bears 20–10

Fourth Quarter

- CHI – Gale Sayers 7-yard run (Roger LeClerc kick) – Bears 27–10
- BAL – John Mackey 79-yard pass from Johnny Unitas (Lou Michaels kick) – Bears 27–17

Colts

- Johnny Unitas
  18/38, 274 Yds, TD, 2 INT
- Tom Matte
  4 Rush, 57 Yds
- John Mackey
  2 Rec, 89 Yds, TD

Bears

- Rudy Bukich
  8/15, 96 Yds, INT
- Gale Sayers
  18 Rush, 106 Yds, 2 TD
- Jimmy Jones
  3 Rec, 64 Yds
