= Willie Galimore =

American football player (1935–1964)

- Galimore in 1960

No. 28
- Position: Halfback

Personal information
- Born: March 30, 1935; St. Augustine, Florida, U.S.
- Died: July 27, 1964 (aged 29); Rensselaer, Indiana, U.S.
- Listed height: 6 ft 1 in (1.85 m)
- Listed weight: 187 lb (85 kg)

Career information
- High school: Excelsior (St. Augustine)
- College: Florida A&M (1953–1956)
- NFL draft: 1956: 5th round, 58th overall pick

Career history
- Chicago Bears (1957–1963)

Awards and highlights
- NFL champion (1963); Second-team All-Pro (1958); Pro Bowl (1958); Chicago Bears No. 28 retired; 100 greatest Bears of All-Time

Career NFL statistics
- Rushing yards: 2,985
- Rushing average: 4.5
- Receptions: 87
- Receiving yards: 1,201
- Total touchdowns: 37
- Stats at Pro Football Reference
- College Football Hall of Fame

Willie Galimore (March 30, 1935 – July 27, 1964), nicknamed "the Wisp", was an American professional football player who played halfback for the Chicago Bears of the National Football League (NFL) from 1957 to 1963. He was selected by the Bears in the fifth round of the 1956 NFL draft. His NFL career was cut short with his death at age 29 in a traffic accident just ahead of the 1964 season.

Galimore played college football for the Florida A&M Rattlers of Florida A&M University, a historically black school, working with the legendary coach Jake Gaither. He was inducted a member of the College Football Hall of Fame in 1999. As a professional, Galimore was a member of the Bears team that won the 1963 NFL Championship Game and his jersey number 28 is one of fourteen uniform numbers retired by the Bears.

== Biography ==
=== Early life ===
Willie Galimore was born March 30, 1935, in St. Augustine, Florida. He attended Excelsior High School in that city.

=== College career ===
In 1952, Galimore enrolled at Florida A&M University (FAMU) in Tallahassee, Florida, a historically black school with a total enrollment of just 1,000 men and 1,000 women at that time. Despite Florida A&M's small enrollment, the school was a legitimate football powerhouse under legendary head coach Alonzo S. "Jake" Gaither. The 8–2 Rattlers were National Negro Football Champions in 1952, but had suffered the loss of 15 players to graduation and 10 more to the military draft, leaving the cupboard bare for 1953.

Galimore (#48, middle row, far right) with lettermen returning for the 1954 Florida A&M squad.

One of the 19 returning players coach Gaither placed his hopes upon was sophomore Willie Galimore, who did not letter in 1952 but who was regarded as a "sure comer" and penciled in as the starter at the critical left halfback position. Gaither's assessment proved astute, with the Rattlers finishing the 1953 season undefeated at 9–0, having administered five straight shutouts to opponents to start the year. At the post-season team banquet Galimore was presented with the J.R.E. Lee Sr. Memorial Trophy as FAMU's outstanding player of the 1953 season. The Rattlers again won the Southern Intercollegiate Athletic Association championship and Galimore was tapped as an All-American for the first time.

Galimore was one of the lettermen taking the field for Florida A&M in the 1954 season — part of a 70 man veteran and freshman contingent as fall football practice opened. The Rattlers' excellent starting backfield returned complete for Galimore's junior season, and expectations were high, despite the loss of three starters on the line to graduation or the draft. Once again Galimore — called by one reporter one of "the fastest men ever to lace on football shoes" — was a team star, helping lead FAMU to a record of 8–1 and a share of the informal Negro National Football Championship.

In the 1954 season's ultimate game, the 22nd Orange Blossom Classic, played in front of more than 41,000 fans, Galimore broke an Orange Bowl individual record, gaining 295 yards on the ground. This record could have been even more epic if not for referee flags, as Galimore had additional touchdowns of 87 and 72 yards called back by penalty. The points were not needed, as the Rattlers routed Maryland State College, 67–19, with Galimore crossing the goal line to paydirt three times.

Galimore finished his time at Florida A&M as the school's all-time leading rusher, with 3,592 yards gained — an average of 8 yards per carry. He was the first three-time All-American in the history of the school and still holds the FAMU single-game rushing record for his 295 yard performance against Maryland state in 1954.

As the 1955 season approached, head coach Jake Gather was sold: his left halfback was among the best runners in the entire country.

Although Galimore still retained a year of eligibility at Florida A&M for the 1956 season, he was drafted as a "future" by the Chicago Bears of the National Football League in the January 1956 NFL draft. The Bears made the Florida speedster their choice in the fifth round of the draft, the 58th overall player selected.

=== Professional career ===
In a Saturday night game in October 1957, Galimore (#28) takes a screen pass 56 yards for a touchdown against the Baltimore Colts.

Blessed with incredible speed and impressive lateral mobility, the difficulty suffered by defenders attempting to contain Galimore earned him the nickname "Willie the Wisp". He ran with a slightly gangly upright style comparable to Lenny Moore of the Baltimore Colts and was at his best beating defenders to the edge.

In a documentary short by NFL Films on Galimore, it was said that he was probably the last great find before NFL scouting became sophisticated. Bears assistant coach Phil Handler, while scouting for talent in Florida, received a tip about Galimore's prowess as a halfback, and the Bears subsequently drafted him in the fifth round (58th overall) of the 1956 NFL draft. His contemporaries (including Chuck Bednarik and Doug Atkins) referred to Galimore as one of the best runners they ever faced.

=== Social activism ===
Galimore's last visit to his hometown of St. Augustine, Florida came just weeks before his death, and he participated in the St. Augustine movement during the Civil Rights Movement, becoming the first black person who was able to register as a guest at the previously all-white Ponce de Leon Motor Lodge, where the arrest of the 72-year-old mother of the governor of Massachusetts for trying to be served in a racially integrated group had made national headlines a few months before.

Galimore's civil rights activism is honored with a Freedom Trail marker at his home at 57 Chapin Street in St. Augustine. His widow, Audrey Galimore, took part in the dedication of the marker on July 2, 2007. A community center in the historic Lincolnville neighborhood of the city also bears Galimore's name, and he is depicted on a historical mural painted by schoolchildren on Washington Street.

=== Death and legacy ===
At age 29, Galimore and teammate Bo Farrington were killed in an automobile accident on July 27, 1964, in Rensselaer, Indiana. Galimore's Volkswagen left the road on a curve and rolled, a few miles from the team's training camp at St. Joseph's College. His number 28 was retired by the Bears.

Galimore was inducted into the College Football Hall of Fame in 1999.

Galimore's son, Ron Galimore, was the first black member of the United States gymnastic team.

== NFL career statistics ==
Legend
	Won the NFL championship
	Led the league
**Bold**	Career high

=== Regular season ===
Year	Team	Games		Rushing					Receiving				
Year	Team	GP	GS	Att	Yds	Avg	Lng	TD	Rec	Yds	Avg	Lng	TD
1957	CHI	12	12	127	538	4.2	67	5	15	201	13.4	56	2
1958	CHI	12	1	130	619	4.8	36	**8**	8	151	**18.9**	79	**3**
1959	CHI	12	2	58	199	3.4	36	1	10	125	12.5	34	2
1960	CHI	12	9	74	368	5.0	54	1	3	35	11.7	33	0
1961	CHI	14	12	**153**	**707**	4.6	60	4	**33**	**502**	15.2	**84**	**3**
1962	CHI	7	3	43	233	**5.4**	**77**	2	5	56	11.2	29	0
1963	CHI	13	5	85	321	3.8	51	5	13	131	10.1	44	0
		82	44	670	2,985	4.5	77	26	87	1,201	13.8	84	10

=== Playoffs ===
Year	Team	Games		Rushing					Receiving				
Year	Team	GP	GS	Att	Yds	Avg	Lng	TD	Rec	Yds	Avg	Lng	TD
1963	CHI	1	1	7	12	1.7	7	0	0	0	0.0	0	0
		1	1	7	12	1.7	7	0	0	0	0.0	0	0

== See also ==
- List of gridiron football players who died during their careers
