= Rick Casares =

American football player (1931–2013)

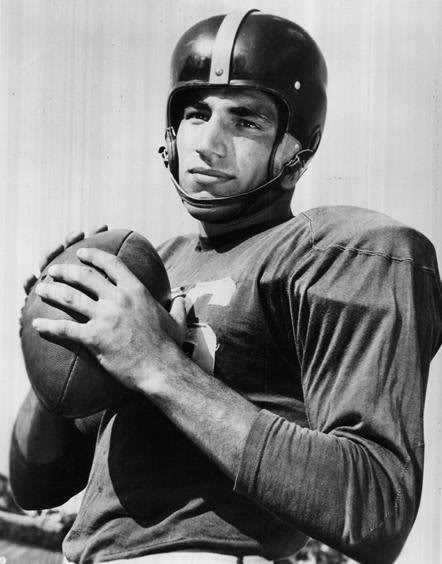
- Casares in 1953

No. 35
- Position: Fullback

Personal information
- Born: July 4, 1931; Tampa, Florida, U.S.
- Died: September 13, 2013 (aged 82); Tampa, Florida, U.S.
- Listed height: 6 ft 2 in (1.88 m)
- Listed weight: 226 lb (103 kg)

Career information
- High school: Thomas Jefferson (Tampa)
- College: Florida (1951–1953)
- NFL draft: 1954: 2nd round, 18th overall pick

Career history
- Chicago Bears (1955–1964); Washington Redskins (1965); Miami Dolphins (1966)

Awards and highlights
- NFL champion (1963); First-team All-Pro (1956); Second-team All-Pro (1957); 5× Pro Bowl (1955–1959); NFL rushing yards leader (1956); NFL rushing touchdowns leader (1956); 100 greatest Bears of All-Time; Second-team All-SEC (1952); University of Florida Athletic Hall of Fame; Florida–Georgia Hall of Fame

Career NFL/AFL statistics
- Rushing yards: 5,797
- Rushing average: 4.1
- Receptions: 191
- Receiving yards: 1,588
- Total touchdowns: 60
- Stats at Pro Football Reference

Richard Jose Casares (July 4, 1931 – September 13, 2013) was an American professional football player who was a fullback in the National Football League (NFL) and American Football League (AFL) for twelve seasons during the 1950s and 1960s. Casares played college football for the University of Florida, where he was standout fullback and kicker. Casares played professionally for the Chicago Bears and Washington Redskins of the NFL, and was a member of the expansion Miami Dolphins of the AFL.

== Early life ==
Rick Casares was born in Tampa, Florida, in 1931. When he was 7 years old, his father was killed in a gang shooting; his mother sent him to live with an aunt and uncle in Paterson, New Jersey. At 15, Casares became a Golden Gloves boxing champion in the 160-pound division. When he was offered a professional boxing contract, his mother refused to permit it, and he returned to Tampa.

From the age of 15, Casares lived in West Tampa with his mother, and he attended Thomas Jefferson High School in Tampa, where his teachers introduced him to high school sports as a way to keep him in school. The Jefferson coaches discovered the 190-pound, six-foot-one-inch freshman when he picked up a javelin for the first time and threw it. Casares played high school football, basketball, and baseball for the Jefferson Dragons, and he was also a track and field athlete. He was an all-state football and basketball player, and the Dragons won the city football championship in 1948 and 1949.

The Tampa Tribune recognized Casares as one of the Tampa Bay area's 100 greatest athletes of the previous century in 1999. In 2007, fifty-seven years after he graduated from high school, the Florida High School Athletic Association (FHSAA) recognized him as one of the thirty-three all-time greatest Florida high school football players of the last 100 years by naming him to its "All-Century Team."

== College career ==
After graduating from high school, Casares received an athletic scholarship to attend the University of Florida in Gainesville, Florida, where he played fullback for coach Bob Woodruff's Florida Gators football team from 1951 to 1953. Casares quickly became the star rusher of the Gators' backfield. As a 210-pound, six-foot-two-inch sophomore in 1952, he scored the first touchdown of the Gators' first bowl game, a 14–13 victory over the Tulsa Golden Hurricane in the January 1, 1953 Gator Bowl, and was a second-team All-Southeastern Conference (SEC) selection and an honorable mention All-American. In 1953, he was a team captain. Woodruff ranked Casares as the Gators' best back and one of their three best kickers of the 1950s.

Casares was also a member of coach John Mauer's Florida Gators basketball team, and led the team in scoring and rebounding with 14.9 points and 11.3 rebounds as a sophomore in 1951–52, and 15.5 points and 11.5 rebounds as a junior in 1952–53. In basketball, he was a third-team All-SEC selection in 1952; as basketball team captain in 1953, he received second-team All-SEC honors.

Casares' college career was cut short when he was drafted into the U.S. Army after his junior year. He was later inducted into the University of Florida Athletic Hall of Fame as a "Gator Great." As part of an article series for The Gainesville Sun in 2006, he was recognized as No. 37 among the top 100 players of the first 100 years of Florida Gators football.

== Professional career ==
Casares was selected in the second round (eighteenth pick overall) of the 1954 NFL draft by the Chicago Bears, but was offered a $20,000 annual contract with Canadian Football League's Toronto Argonauts. Instead, he accepted owner George Halas's $10,000 offer to become a member of the Chicago Bears, and after fulfilling his military service obligations, he played for the Bears from 1955 to 1964. In the fourth game of the 1955 season, against the Baltimore Colts, he ran for an 81-yard touchdown. He finished his rookie season with 672 yards in 12 games, and earned a spot in the Pro Bowl.

Casares led Chicago in rushing from 1955 through 1960. In 1956, Casares led the NFL in rushing with 235 carries for 1,126 yards. At the time, this was the second most yards gained in a single season in the NFL, short of the NFL single-season record by only 20 yards. Behind Casares' hard-nosed rushing, the Bears advanced to the 1956 NFL Championship Game. However, the Bears' championship game opponents, the New York Giants, completely stifled Casares and crushed the Bears, 47–7. He would, however, win an NFL Championship as a member of the 1963 squad.

During the following 1957 season, Casares again led the NFL with 204 rushing attempts, but his 700 yards was later eclipsed by Jim Brown's 942 yards on two fewer carries. After ten seasons with Chicago, Casares was the Bears' all-time leading rusher with 1,386 carries, 5,657 yards, and forty-nine rushing touchdowns. His Chicago Bears career rushing records weren't broken until Walter Payton shattered them in the 1970s and 1980s, and he remains the fourth all-time rusher in franchise history, behind Payton (16,726 yards), Matt Forte (8,602) and Neal Anderson (6,166 yards), and ahead of Gale Sayers (4,956 yards).

"He was the toughest guy I ever played with," Mike Ditka, a former Bears tight end and coach, told The Tampa Tribune. "I remember him playing on a broken ankle."

Casares was questioned in 1962 by NFL investigators as part of a spreading inquiry that included the FBI into links between league players and organized crime. Casares, who had been seen with a bookie and was known to visit with other Bears players two nightclubs connected to the Chicago mob, said he had been questioned about point shaving for gamblers and had taken and passed two lie detector tests. The investigations eventually would lead to the one-season suspensions of Alex Karras, of the Detroit Lions, and Paul Hornung, of the Green Bay Packers.

Casares finished his professional career with the NFL's Washington Redskins in 1965, and in 1966 with the AFL's Miami Dolphins, receiving only limited carries in his final two seasons.

In 2015, the Professional Football Researchers Association named Casares to the PRFA Hall of Very Good Class of 2015.

== NFL career statistics ==
Legend
| | Won NFL championship |
| | Led the league |
| **Bold** | Career high |

=== Regular season ===
| Year | Team | Games | | Rushing | | | | | Receiving | | | | |
| Year | Team | GP | GS | Att | Yds | Avg | Lng | TD | Rec | Yds | Avg | Lng | TD |
|---|---|---|---|---|---|---|---|---|---|---|---|---|---|
| 1955 | CHI | 12 | 5 | 125 | 672 | **5.4** | **81** | 4 | 16 | 136 | 8.5 | 29 | 1 |
| 1956 | CHI | 12 | **12** | **234** | **1,126** | 4.8 | 68 | **12** | 23 | 203 | 8.8 | 33 | **2** |
| 1957 | CHI | 12 | **12** | 204 | 700 | 3.4 | 25 | 6 | 25 | 225 | 9.0 | 43 | 0 |
| 1958 | CHI | 12 | **12** | 176 | 651 | 3.7 | 64 | 2 | **32** | **290** | 9.1 | 50 | 1 |
| 1959 | CHI | 12 | **12** | 177 | 699 | 3.9 | 47 | 10 | 27 | 273 | **10.1** | 43 | **2** |
| 1960 | CHI | 12 | 11 | 160 | 566 | 3.5 | 35 | 5 | 8 | 64 | 8.0 | 21 | 0 |
| 1961 | CHI | **13** | 10 | 135 | 588 | 4.4 | 23 | 8 | 8 | 69 | 8.6 | 31 | 0 |
| 1962 | CHI | 13 | 9 | 75 | 255 | 3.4 | 18 | 2 | 10 | 71 | 7.1 | 24 | 1 |
| 1963 | CHI | 10 | 8 | 65 | 277 | 4.3 | 30 | 0 | 19 | 94 | 4.9 | 25 | 1 |
| 1964 | CHI | 13 | 3 | 35 | 123 | 3.5 | 28 | 0 | 14 | 113 | 8.1 | **51** | **2** |
| 1965 | WAS | 3 | 1 | 2 | 5 | 2.5 | 3 | 0 | 1 | 5 | 5.0 | 5 | 0 |
| 1966 | MIA | 6 | 2 | 43 | 135 | 3.1 | 10 | 0 | 8 | 45 | 5.6 | 20 | 1 |
| Career | | 130 | 97 | 1,431 | 5,797 | 4.1 | 81 | 49 | 191 | 1,588 | 8.3 | 51 | 11 |

=== Postseason ===
| Year | Team | Games | | Rushing | | | | | Receiving | | | | |
| Year | Team | GP | GS | Att | Yds | Avg | Lng | TD | Rec | Yds | Avg | Lng | TD |
|---|---|---|---|---|---|---|---|---|---|---|---|---|---|
| 1956 | CHI | 1 | 1 | 14 | 43 | 3.1 | 12 | 1 | 4 | 41 | 10.3 | 19 | 0 |
| Career | | 1 | 1 | 14 | 43 | 3.1 | 12 | 1 | 4 | 41 | 10.3 | 19 | 0 |

== Life after football ==
Casares retired to his hometown of Tampa, Florida following his professional football career and some business projects in Chicago. His last career venture was in the residential home improvement field, specializing in room additions. He died on September 13, 2013, at the age of 82, after a string of illnesses, including heart disease and shoulder problems stemming from his days in football. As a U.S. Army veteran, Casares was buried in the Sarasota National Cemetery.

== See also ==
- Florida Gators football, 1950–59
- History of the Chicago Bears
- List of American Football League players
- List of Chicago Bears players
- List of Florida Gators in the NFL draft
- List of Miami Dolphins players
- List of Washington Redskins players
- List of University of Florida Athletic Hall of Fame members
