= Johnny Morris (American football) =

American football player (born 1935)

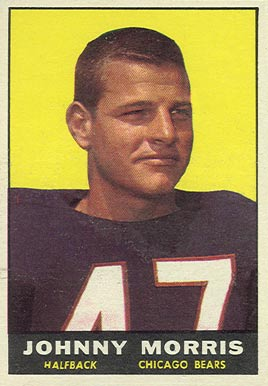
- Morris on a 1961 trading card

No. 47
- Positions: Flanker, halfback

Personal information
- Born: September 26, 1935 (age 91); Long Beach, California, U.S.
- Listed height: 5 ft 10 in (1.78 m)
- Listed weight: 180 lb (82 kg)

Career information
- High school: Long Beach Polytechnic
- College: UC Santa Barbara (1954–1957)
- NFL draft: 1958: 12th round, 137th overall pick

Career history
- Chicago Bears (1958–1967)

Awards and highlights
- NFL champion (1963); First-team All-Pro (1964); Pro Bowl (1960); NFL receptions leader (1964); NFL receiving yards leader (1964); NFL receiving touchdowns co-leader (1964); 100 greatest Bears of All-Time; First-team All-CCAA (1957)

Career NFL statistics
- Receptions: 356
- Receiving yards: 5,059
- Receiving touchdowns: 31
- Rushing yards: 1,040
- Rushing average: 4.6
- Rushing touchdowns: 5
- Stats at Pro Football Reference

Johnny Edward Morris (born September 26, 1935) is an American former professional football player who was a flanker and halfback for the Chicago Bears in the National Football League (NFL). He spent his entire ten-year career with the Bears, and is the franchise's all-time leader in receiving yards with 5,059. He played college football for the UC Santa Barbara Gauchos. Morris won an NFL championship in 1963. In 1964, he had his best season with 93 receptions for 1,200 yards and 10 touchdowns. His 93 receptions set an NFL record at the time.

== Early life ==
Morris was born on September 26, 1935, in Long Beach California. He attended Long Beach Polytechnic High School (Poly). At 140 pounds (63.5 kg), he was deemed too small to play varsity football at Poly, and had to play Class B football. Disheartened, he left football for the school's track team.

== College career ==
Morris did not receive any athletic scholarship offers after graduating high school. He attended the University of California, Santa Barbara, where he became a star halfback on the football team under coach Ed Cody. Morris weighed only 160 pounds (72.6 kg). He excelled as a rusher, receiver and returner. As a junior, he returned a punt 70 yards for a touchdown against Occidental College, while wearing only one shoe. In his final game as a senior in 1957, he returned a kickoff 86 yards for a touchdown. Morris went into that 1957 Thanksgiving Day game with an 8.1 yards per carry rushing average.

As a senior in 1957, Morris was named first-team All-California Collegiate Athletic Association (CCAA) at halfback. One of the other first-team selections was future Pro Football Hall of Fame coach John Madden at tackle.

== Professional football ==
Cody had played for George Halas and the Chicago Bears in 1949–50. When NFL teams showed no interest in Morris coming out of college, Cody strongly recommended Morris to Halas, and after looking into Morris he was impressed. After learning the Green Bay Packers subsequently showed an interest in Morris, Halas decided not to wait in taking Morris on as an undrafted free agent, and selected Morris in the 12th round of the 1958 NFL draft (137th overall).

He came to the Bears at 5 ft 10 in (1.88 m) 175 lb. (79.4 kg), and had run the 50-yard dash in a record 5.2 seconds. However, he was smaller than all of the other running backs during the Bears' 1958 training camp, and Morris anticipated being cut. Bears' quarterback George Blanda admired Morris's determination and made sure to give Morris opportunities to prove himself to Halas. Morris made the team, and went on to a 10-year career with the Bears.

=== 1958–63 ===
One of his first rushing attempts in an NFL game came against the Baltimore Colts in 1958. Morris ran into 6 ft 6 in (1.98 m) 284 lb. (128 kg) Colts' tackle Gene "Big Daddy" Lipscomb. Morris bounced off Lipscomb's shoulder and fell to the ground. Morris said "'Lipscomb looked down at me, shook his head sadly, then grasped me by the shoulder and with one arm lifted me up'".

As a rookie in 1958, Morris started three games at halfback. He had 239 rushing yards in 52 attempts (4.6 yards per attempt), with two touchdowns. He also had 11 receptions for 170 yards. Morris returned 14 punts for 96 yards and 16 kickoffs for 399 yards (24.9 yards per return). He was second in the NFL in yards per kickoff return and sixth in total kickoff return yards.

By his second year with the Bears (1959), Morris was up to 180 pounds (82 kg). He started all 12 games, playing left halfback. He had 312 yards on 87 rushing attempts, and 13 receptions for 197 yards (15.2 yards per catch) and two touchdown catches. He returned 14 punts for 171 yards, including a 78-yard punt return for a touchdown against the Los Angeles Rams; the second longest punt return in Bears' history at the time. He also returned 17 kickoffs for 438 yards. His 25.8 yards per kickoff return was second best in the NFL. His 12.2 yards per punt return was best in the league, but Jon Arnett's 10.8 yards per return officially led the NFL as Morris had not returned a sufficient number of punts to qualify.

Morris was mostly kept on the sidelines during the first two games of 1960 with a toe injury, but still wound up being selected to the Pro Bowl that season. In his return to full play against the Rams in the season's third game, he caught touchdown passes of 45 and 66 yards, and had 124 yards on only three receptions. He also gained 32 rushing yards and returned two kickoffs for 39 yards. The following week against the San Francisco 49ers he had rushing touchdowns of 61 and 37 yards, with 114 rushing yards in only seven attempts for the game. On the season, Morris started only three games. He finished with 417 rushing yards on a 5.7 yards per attempt average and three rushing touchdowns; along with 20 receptions for 224 yards and three receiving touchdowns. He returned 13 punts for 75 yards, and 19 kickoffs for 384 yards.

Bears offensive backs coach Chuck Mather said Morris made the fewest mistakes of any running back he had, and was a good blocker. However, after recognizing the difficulties Morris created for an individual defender trying to tackle him, the Bears moved him to flanker in 1961 to put him in more one-on-one situations as a receiver. This was in line with an NFL trend to move fast and agile running backs to a receiver position, starting with Dub Jones and Hall of Famer Elroy Hirsch, and continuing with players like Hall of Famers Tommy McDonald, Bobby Mitchell and Lenny Moore. The switch came just before the season started, giving Morris limited time to learn his new position.

In 1961, he caught 36 passes for 548 yards, with four touchdown receptions. He had an 80-yard touchdown catch against the 49ers in a November game, with 123 yards on four receptions. In 1962, he had 58 receptions for 889 yards and five touchdown catches. His longest reception of the season was on a 73-yard touchdown pass from Bill Wade. He was tied for fifth best in total receptions with future Hall of Fame teammate Mike Ditka and Tommy McDonald. He returned 20 punts for 208 yards (10.4 yards per return). His total punt return yards were third best in the NFL, as was his 10.4 return average.

The Bears were NFL champions in 1963, with an 11–1–2 record. However, Morris's ability to play during the season was limited by a badly pulled leg muscle, and his numbers declined to 47 receptions for 705 yards and two touchdowns. He caught two passes for 19 yards, and returned two punts for five yards in the championship game victory over the New York Giants, 14–10.

=== 1964 record setting season ===
Morris's best season came in 1964. He was selected first-team All-Pro by the Associated Press (AP), United Press International (UPI) and the Newspaper Enterprise Association (NEA). He only missed the Pro Bowl because of a broken collarbone. The Century Club selected him as Long Beach's Athlete-of-the-Year.

In 1964, over a 14-game season, Morris set an NFL record with 93 receptions (breaking Hall of Famer Tom Fears' 14-year-old record of 84 catches in a 12-game schedule). He also broke the Bears all-time total receptions record that year (ending the season with a career 278 receptions). His 93-reception record stood until Hall of Fame receiver Art Monk caught 106 passes in 1984, in a 16-game season.

As a receiver, Morris also led the league with 1,200 receiving yards, 10 touchdown receptions, and in averaging 85.7 yards per game. His finished fourth in Most Valuable Player voting behind Hall of Famers Johnny Unitas, Jim Brown and Lenny Moore. He became the sixth player in NFL history to win the receivers' "Triple Crown" with the most receptions, yards and receiving touchdowns in the same season, after Hall of Famers Ray Flaherty, Don Hutson, Pete Pihos, Elroy Hirsch and Raymond Berry. It was his first year with the Bears in which he did not return punts.

=== 1965–67 ===
In 1965, future Hall of Fame running back Gale Sayers joined the Bears. In 1964, the Bears' top rusher was Jon Arnett, who gained 400 yards in 119 attempts. In 1965, Sayers ran for 867 yards on 166 carries, with 14 touchdowns, while Arnett still had 102 carries. Sayers also had 29 receptions for 507 yards and six more touchdowns. Sayers was Rookie-of-the Year. The Bears rushed the ball over 100 plays more in 1965 (479) than in 1964 (356). In 1965, Morris started all 14 games, with 53 receptions for 846 yards and four touchdowns. He was eighth in the NFL in total receptions.

In 1966, Morris had a knee injury requiring surgery and only played in two games. He returned for one final year with the Bears in 1967. He scrimmaged with the Bears against the college all-stars in preparation for the 1967 Chicago College All-Star Game, and his knee held up. He started in 12 games for the Bears during the season, but only had 20 receptions for 231 yards and one touchdown. Aside from the 1966 season lost to injury, Morris had the least yards from scrimmage of any year in his career.

Nearing age 33, Morris retired before the start of the 1968 season to devote full time to his sportscasting job in Chicago. He had a recurring groin injury, and his surgically repaired knee had never fully healed.

== Legacy ==
At the time Morris retired he had 356 career receptions, 31 receiving touchdowns and a 14.2 yards per catch average over his ten-year career. His 5,059 total receiving yards was seventh highest among active NFL receivers. He is the all-time Bears leader in total receiving yards, and is third all-time in Bears history in total receptions, behind Hall of Fame running back Walter Payton (492, 9.2 yards per catch) and running back Matt Forte(487, 8.5 yards per catch).

In 2019, Bears Centennial Scrapbook authors Dan Pompei and Don Pierson, and the Chicago Tribune, listed Morris as the 44th greatest Bears player ever.

== Sportscaster career ==
In 1964, while still playing for the Bears, Morris joined WBBM-TV in Chicago, eventually becoming one of Chicago's most popular television broadcasters. He analyzed Bears' game film during his first few years, while still a player, and later became a sports anchor and sportscaster. As an anchor, Morris worked with his wife Jeannie as a features reporter (before and after their amicable divorce). Except for a six-year stint at rival WMAQ-TV (where he first worked with Jeannie), Morris remained at WBBM until 1992, serving for most of that time as sports director. WBBM first made Morris its sports anchor in 1975 when seeking a suitable replacement for future Sports Broadcasting Hall of Fame and Pro Football Hall of Fame member Brent Musburger.

Morris became the top-rated Chicago television sports anchor, and other Chicago television stations actively worked to surpass him. In 1984, WBBM signed him to a nearly $1 million a year long-term contract, equal to the deal with the station's news anchor Walter Jacobson; and significantly greater than sums paid to anchors at rival stations.

He became good friends with film critic Gene Siskel after Siskel was hired by WBBM in 1974. Morris was a pallbearer at Siskel's funeral. During his time at WBBM-TV, he popularized the use of the Telestrator (a device for drawing over still or moving video images) in sports television, which was invented by fellow WBBM-TV employee Leonard Reiffel for his science-related TV series Dimensions on Tomorrow's Living and The World Tomorrow. Among other things, Reiffel was a nuclear physicist who worked under Enrico Fermi, and had also worked at NASA.

Morris also served as a football color commentator for CBS' NFL coverage from 1975 to 1986. He partially retired in 1992, and fully retired in 1996.

== NFL career statistics ==
Legend
	Won the NFL championship
	Led the league
**Bold**	Career high

Year	Team	Games		Receiving					Rushing					Returning				
Year	Team	GP	GS	Rec	Yds	Avg	Lng	TD	Att	Yds	Avg	Lng	TD	Ret	Yds	Avg	Lng	TD
1958	CHI	12	3	11	170	15.5	51	0	52	239	4.6	32	2	30	495	16.5	45	0
1959	CHI	12	12	13	197	15.2	51	2	**87**	312	3.6	33	0	31	**609**	**19.7**	**78**	**1**
1960	CHI	12	3	20	224	11.2	66	3	73	**417**	5.7	**61**	**3**	**32**	459	14.3	32	0
1961	CHI	**14**	12	36	548	15.2	**80**	4	8	49	6.1	21	0	25	201	8.0	25	0
1962	CHI	**14**	**14**	58	889	15.3	73	5	2	7	3.5	4	0	20	208	10.4	33	0
1963	CHI	13	12	47	705	15.0	51	2	1	10	**10.0**	10	0	16	164	10.3	42	0
1964	CHI	**14**	**14**	**93**	**1,200**	12.9	63	**10**	–	–	–	–	–	–	–	–	–	–
1965	CHI	**14**	**14**	53	846	**16.0**	**80**	4	–	–	–	–	–	–	–	–	–	–
1966	CHI	2	2	5	49	9.8	15	0	–	–	–	–	–	–	–	–	–	–
1967	CHI	**14**	12	20	231	11.6	31	1	1	6	6.0	6	0	4	24	6.0	15	0
Career		121	98	356	5,059	14.2	80	31	224	1,040	4.6	61	5	158	2,160	13.7	78	1

== Personal life ==
His father was from Achladokampos, Greece (family name Μονοπορης, or Monoporis), while his mother was Swedish. While playing for the Bears, Morris was known as "Little Greek" and teammate Bill George was "Big Greek".

Morris was married to sports reporter Jeannie Morris, whom he met at UC Santa Barbara, from 1960 to 1985. The two remained close after their divorce as television colleagues. Jeannie died December 14, 2020.
