= Angelo Coia =

American football player (1938–2013)

No. 46, 48
- Position: Wide receiver

Personal information
- Born: April 21, 1938; Philadelphia, Pennsylvania, U.S.
- Died: January 2, 2013 (aged 74); Brigantine, New Jersey, U.S.
- Listed height: 6 ft 3 in (1.91 m)
- Listed weight: 195 lb (88 kg)

Career information
- High school: Northeast (Philadelphia)
- College: The Citadel (1955-1956); USC (1958-1959)
- NFL draft: 1960: 20th round, 237th overall pick
- AFL draft: 1960

Career history
- Chicago Bears (1960–1963); Washington Redskins (1964–1965); Atlanta Falcons (1966)

Awards and highlights
- NFL champion (1963)

Career NFL statistics
- Receptions: 121
- Receiving yards: 2,037
- Receiving touchdowns: 20
- Stats at Pro Football Reference

Angelo Anthony Coia (April 21, 1938 – January 2, 2013) was an American football end in the National Football League (NFL) for the Chicago Bears, the Washington Redskins, and the Atlanta Falcons.

== Biography ==
Coia played college football at the University of Southern California (USC) and The Citadel and was selected in the 20th round of the 1960 NFL draft. He attended Northeast Public High School in Philadelphia and was a teammate of future Green Bay Packer Herb Adderley there. At Northeast, Coia starred as a football player at halfback and with Adderley helped lead the team to the 1955 Public League Championship. He also was the city sprint champion at 220 yards in track.

After his NFL career, Coia was a racehorse owner and worked as a scout for the Raiders. Before his death, Coia was a resident of Brigantine, New Jersey.

== NFL career statistics ==
Legend
	Won the NFL championship
**Bold**	Career high

=== Regular season ===
Year	Team	Games		Receiving				
Year	Team	GP	GS	Rec	Yds	Avg	Lng	TD
1960	CHI	12	10	25	478	19.1	59	4
1961	CHI	11	4	12	249	20.8	64	3
1962	CHI	9	6	22	361	16.4	71	4
1963	CHI	12	4	11	116	10.5	18	1
1964	WAS	14	13	**29**	**500**	17.2	**80**	**5**
1965	WAS	13	7	18	240	13.3	45	3
1966	ATL	6	3	4	93	**23.3**	39	0
Career		77	47	121	2,037	16.8	80	20

=== Playoffs ===
Year	Team	Games		Receiving				
Year	Team	GP	GS	Rec	Yds	Avg	Lng	TD
1963	CHI	1	0	1	22	22.0	22	0
Career		1	0	1	22	22.0	22	0
