= Joe Marconi =

American football player (1934–1992)

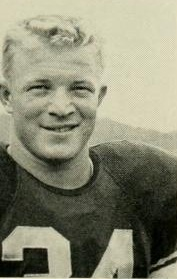
- Marconi from The 1955 Monticola

No. 34
- Positions: Fullback, punter

Personal information
- Born: February 6, 1934; Fredericktown, Pennsylvania, U.S.
- Died: August 23, 1992 (aged 58); Downers Grove, Illinois, U.S.
- Listed height: 6 ft 2 in (1.88 m)
- Listed weight: 225 lb (102 kg)

Career information
- High school: Fredericktown
- College: West Virginia (1952–1955)
- NFL draft: 1956: 1st round, 6th overall pick

Career history
- Los Angeles Rams (1956–1961); Chicago Bears (1962–1966)

Awards and highlights
- NFL champion (1963); Pro Bowl (1963); First-team All-Southern (1954)

Career NFL statistics
- Rushing yards: 2,771
- Rushing average: 4.1
- Receptions: 136
- Receiving yards: 1,326
- Punts: 18
- Punting yards: 754
- Total touchdowns: 39
- Stats at Pro Football Reference

Joseph George Marconi (February 6, 1934 – August 23, 1992) was an American professional football fullback who played professionally for the Los Angeles Rams and Chicago Bears in the National Football League (NFL).

== Biography ==
Marconi was born in the Pittsburgh area city of Frederickton, Pennsylvania on February 6, 1934. He played football in high school and was offered an athletic scholarship at the University of Maryland, but he didn't like the school and found himself at West Virginia University.

He was first used on defense, but was found to be too productive on offense in the running game and was part of the backfield. As a running back, he piled up 998 career yards on 181 carries for an impressive 5.5 average and 18 touchdowns.

Marconi helped West Virginia to a 31–7 record during his four-year tenure. He was selected to play in the College Football All-Star Game and the Blue–Gray Football Classic after his senior season and he ended up being the Los Angeles Rams first pick in the 1956 draft. He accumulated impressive yardage as a Ram with 1,769 yards and 21 touchdowns. He was traded to the Bears before the 1962 season.

On January 1, 1964, Marconi was injured in a New Year's Day brawl at a bowling alley in Willowbrook, Illinois that resulted in the death of former Illinois linebacker Tony Parrilli, who was accidentally shot by the Willowbrook police chief. The bowling alley was owned by Bears tight end Mike Ditka.

He played five years with the Bears organization and was elected to the Pro Bowl in 1964. In 1966, he retired from football to become a sales representative in the steel business.

== NFL career statistics ==
Legend
	Won the NFL championship
**Bold**	Career high

=== Regular season ===
Year	Team	Games		Rushing					Receiving				
Year	Team	GP	GS	Att	Yds	Avg	Lng	TD	Rec	Yds	Avg	Lng	TD
1956	RAM	12	3	75	298	4.0	23	**7**	12	70	5.8	31	0
1957	RAM	10	3	104	**481**	4.6	31	3	16	171	10.7	61	1
1958	RAM	12	8	89	428	4.8	45	1	10	87	8.7	15	0
1959	RAM	12	3	52	176	3.4	21	4	10	81	8.1	30	1
1960	RAM	12	4	42	240	**5.7**	**75**	3	9	32	3.6	17	0
1961	RAM	13	0	36	146	4.1	14	3	4	20	5.0	8	1
1962	CHI	13	4	89	406	4.6	57	5	23	306	**13.3**	**63**	1
1963	CHI	14	6	**118**	446	3.8	19	2	**28**	**335**	12.0	**63**	2
1964	CHI	13	7	46	98	2.1	8	2	20	181	9.1	29	**3**
1965	CHI	14	4	19	47	2.5	10	0	4	43	10.8	29	0
1966	CHI	10	1	3	5	1.7	3	0	0	0	0.0	0	0
Career		135	43	673	2,771	4.1	75	30	136	1,326	9.8	63	9

=== Playoffs ===
Year	Team	Games		Rushing					Receiving				
Year	Team	GP	GS	Att	Yds	Avg	Lng	TD	Rec	Yds	Avg	Lng	TD
1963	CHI	1	1	3	5	1.7	3	0	3	64	21.3	34	0
Career		1	1	3	5	1.7	3	0	3	64	21.3	34	0

== Death ==
Marconi died in Downers Grove, Illinois, his home.
