= Roger LeClerc =

Roger LeClerc may refer to:

- Monsieur Roger LeClerc, a fictional character from the British sitcom series 'Allo 'Allo!
- Roger LeClerc (American football) (1936–2021), American football player and coach
