= Bob Jenks =

Bob Jenks may refer to:

- Bobby Jenks (1981–2025), American baseball pitcher
- Bob Jencks (1941–2010), American football kicker
