= Ronnie Bull (American football) =

American football player (born 1940)

No. 29, 47
- Position: Running back

Personal information
- Born: February 2, 1940 (age 86); Kingsville, Texas, U.S.
- Listed height: 6 ft 0 in (1.83 m)
- Listed weight: 200 lb (91 kg)

Career information
- College: Baylor
- NFL draft: 1962: 1st round, 7th overall pick
- AFL draft: 1962: 1st round, 3rd overall pick

Career history
- Chicago Bears (1962–1970); Philadelphia Eagles (1971)

Awards and highlights
- NFL champion (1963); NFL Rookie of the Year Award (1962); Second-team All-American (1960); Third-team All-American (1961); First-team All-SWC (1960); Second-team All-SWC (1961)

Career NFL statistics
- Rushing yards: 3,222
- Rushing average: 3.7
- Receptions: 172
- Receiving yards: 1,479
- Total touchdowns: 14
- Stats at Pro Football Reference

Ronald David Bull (born February 2, 1940) is an American former professional football player who was a running back in the National Football League (NFL).

== Early life ==
Bull was born on February 2, 1940, in Kingsville, Texas. He started playing organized football as a halfback when he was in fifth grade. He played running back at Bishop High School in Bishop, Texas. In his senior year, Bull rushed for 2,451 yards in 12 games and led the nation in scoring with 225 points. He averaged 25 carries a game in high school. Bull earned All-District, All-State and All-America recognition. In his most prolific single game, he rushed for 395 yards and five touchdowns.

== College football ==
Bull was a two-way player at Baylor University (1958–61), in the Southwest Conference (SWC), starring on offense at halfback. Over three years, he rushed for 1,359 years, averaging 4.6 yards per carry, with 13 touchdowns. He also had 59 pass receptions for 636 yards and eight touchdowns. He even completed four passes, one going for a touchdown in 1959. Bull also played defense, started 36 of 37 games, and played 40 minutes in the game in which he did not start.

Bull was frequently in the top five offensive leaders annually in the SWC. In 1959, he was second in the Southwest Conference in receptions and total yards from scrimmage, third in rushing average and reception average, and fourth in rushing yards. In 1960, he was first in the SWC in plays from scrimmage and total touchdowns, second in rushing yards and total yards from scrimmage, third in receptions and reception average, and fourth in receiving yards. As a senior, he was third in receptions, receiving average and total touchdowns, and fourth in yards from scrimmage. He was named Southwest Conference Player of the Year in 1960, and was named an All-American in 1960 and 1961.

While at Baylor he played in the December 31,1960 Gator Bowl against the University of Florida, where he scored a touchdown with a minute left in the game, but Baylor lost 13–12 when it failed in making a two-point conversion. He played in the inaugural 1961 Gotham Bowl in New York, with Baylor winning over Utah State (and star player Merlin Olsen) 24–9. Bull received the Bill Corum Award as the game's most outstanding player.

Bull also played in the East–West Shrine Game, the Senior Bowl, and the College All-Star Game. After gaining 133 yards, including a then-record 58-yard run, Bull was named the 1962 Senior Bowl Most Valuable Player, along with Earl Gros.

Bull was a business administration major in college, and was selected as Baylor’s first CoSIDA (College Sports Information Directors of America) Academic All-American in 1961.

== Professional football ==
Bull was selected in the 1962 American Football League draft by the Dallas Texans with the team's first pick, third overall. Bull also was selected by the Chicago Bears as the seventh pick in the first round in the 1962 NFL draft. He ultimately signed to play for the Bears.

There was a controversy over whether Bull already had signed a contract to play for Bears before the Gotham Bowl, which would have made him ineligible for that game. The Bears personnel director attending the game, future Pro Football Hall of Fame coach George Allen, denied that Bull had already signed with the Bears. After the game, Allen took Bull and his wife to Chicago, as part of the team's effort to sign Bull, before Lamar Hunt, owner of the Dallas Texans, could sign Bull to play for the Texans in the American Football League. Bull did not sign in Chicago and he and his wife went home to Texas. Allen pursued Bull across the country to preempt Bull meeting with Lamar Hunt in Texas. Allen spent five hours talking to Bull at Love Field airport in Dallas, where Bull finally signed a contract with the Bears. Even without Allen's pursuit, Bull had reasoned that his best opportunity to play running back would come with the Bears.

Bull would go on to play nine years for the Bears, and one year with the Philadelphia Eagles before retiring. He started 10 games his rookie year, rushing for 363 yards in 113 attempts. He also had 31 receptions for 331 yards. The Associated Press (AP), United Press International (UPI), and The Sporting News selected Bull as NFL Rookie of the Year, with the Los Angeles' Rams Merlin Olsen second. Bull was on the 1963 Bears world championship team. He was second on the team in rushing attempts and total rushing yards.

When future Hall of Fame halfback Gale Sayers joined the Bears in 1965, he became the focus of the run offense, and Bull played more fullback than halfback. When Sayers was injured nine games into the 1968 season, Bull stepped up and had his best rushing season with 472 yards and a 4.4 yards per carry average, and most rushing attempts since 1963.

He played only six games in 1969, and started only 5 of 12 games in 1970. For his final season, after suffering a knee injury, Chicago traded Bull to the Eagles for a draft pick. He started nine games for Philadelphia and gained 426 yards from scrimmage. During his career, Bull played in 123 games, carried the ball 881 times for 3,222 yards and scored nine rushing touchdowns. He also caught 172 passes for 1,479 yards and five touchdowns.

In a 1963 interview with Sports Illustrated, Bull described the routine nature of the game's brutality. In only his third professional game, he took a fist to the chin while coming out of the backfield for a pass on a "sky pattern", and barely made it to the sideline before passing out unconscious. Bull had been forewarned that a back running a sky pattern had to anticipate being "clotheslined" by a defender. Two days later, his teammates laughed as they repeatedly watched the film of Bull being clotheslined. He described instances when he would be repeatedly kicked at the bottom of a pileup, have his legs intentionally twisted, received thumb jabs to the eyes, be bitten, and have one player drop an elbow down on his back while being tackled by another. Bull did not let his anger get the best of him in response, or let these events get under his skin, because it was "'all part of the game'", "'a matter of dollars and cents'".

== NFL career statistics ==
Legend
	Won the NFL championship
**Bold**	Career high

=== Regular season ===
Year	Team	Games		Rushing					Receiving				
Year	Team	GP	GS	Att	Yds	Avg	Lng	TD	Rec	Yds	Avg	Lng	TD
1962	CHI	14	10	113	363	3.2	24	1	**31**	**331**	10.7	52	0
1963	CHI	13	9	**117**	404	3.5	18	1	19	132	6.9	44	**2**
1964	CHI	13	10	86	320	3.7	**50**	1	15	35	2.3	9	0
1965	CHI	13	10	91	417	**4.6**	33	**3**	16	186	11.6	41	1
1966	CHI	14	10	100	318	3.2	13	0	20	174	8.7	28	0
1967	CHI	12	9	61	176	2.9	11	0	18	250	**13.9**	**63**	1
1968	CHI	13	11	107	**472**	4.4	24	**3**	17	145	8.5	24	0
1969	CHI	6	6	44	187	4.3	16	0	14	91	6.5	17	0
1970	CHI	12	5	68	214	3.1	28	0	13	60	4.6	17	0
1971	PHI	13	9	94	351	3.7	39	0	9	75	8.3	15	1
		123	89	881	3,222	3.7	50	9	172	1,479	8.6	63	5

=== Playoffs ===
Year	Team	Games		Rushing					Receiving				
Year	Team	GP	GS	Att	Yds	Avg	Lng	TD	Rec	Yds	Avg	Lng	TD
1963	CHI	1	0	13	42	3.2	12	0	1	-5	-5.0	-5	0
		1	0	13	42	3.2	12	0	1	-5	-5.0	-5	0

== Honors ==
Bull was inducted into Baylor's Athletics Hall of Fame in 1976. He was among the inaugural inductees in the Texas High School Hall of Fame in 1985. He was also inducted into the Chicagoland Sports Hall of Fame in 2001. Bull was on the cover of the October 14, 1963 issue of Sports Illustrated.

== Personal life ==
He currently runs his specialty advertising business, Ronnie Bull Sales, Inc. in the Chicago area.
