= Steve Barnett (American football) =

American football player (1941–2018)

No. 73, 75
- Positions: Tackle, Guard

Personal information
- Born: June 3, 1941; Sand Springs, Oklahoma, U.S.
- Died: January 2, 2018 (aged 76); Danville, California, U.S.
- Listed height: 6 ft 2 in (1.88 m)
- Listed weight: 255 lb (116 kg)

Career information
- High school: Washington (Fremont, California)
- College: Oregon (1959–1962)
- NFL draft: 1963: 2nd round, 20th overall pick
- AFL draft: 1963: 9th round, 66th overall pick

Career history

Playing
- Chicago Bears (1963); Washington Redskins (1964); Pittsburgh Steelers (1966)*
- * Offseason or practice squad member only

Coaching
- San Jose Apaches (1967) Assistant coach

Awards and highlights
- NFL champion (1963); First-team All-American (1962); Second-team All-American (1961); 3× First-team All-PCC (1960, 1961, 1962)

Career NFL statistics
- Games played: 27
- Games started: 15
- Stats at Pro Football Reference

Jerry Stephen Barnett (June 4, 1941 – January 2, 2018) was an American professional football offensive lineman in the National Football League (NFL) for the Chicago Bears and Washington Redskins. He played college football at the University of Oregon and was selected in the second round of the 1963 NFL draft. Barnett was also selected in the ninth round of the 1963 AFL draft by the San Diego Chargers.
