= Bo Farrington =

American football player (1936–1964)

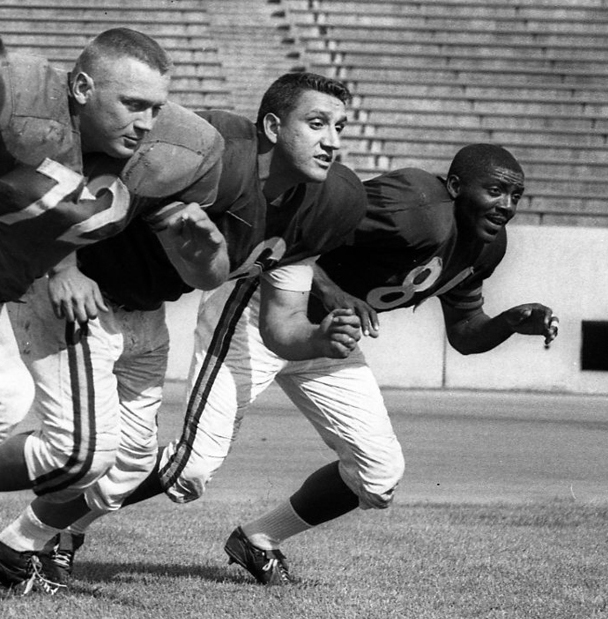
- Farrington (right) with the Chicago Bears in 1961

No. 84
- Position: Tight end

Personal information
- Born: February 6, 1936; DeWalt, Texas, U.S.
- Died: July 27, 1964 (aged 28); Rensselaer, Indiana, U.S.
- Listed height: 6 ft 3 in (1.91 m)
- Listed weight: 217 lb (98 kg)

Career information
- High school: Yates (Houston, Texas)
- College: Prairie View A&M
- NFL draft: 1960: 16th round, 187th overall pick
- AFL draft: 1960

Career history
- Chicago Bears (1960–1963)

Awards and highlights
- NFL champion (1963)

Career NFL statistics
- Receptions: 55
- Receiving yards: 881
- Receiving touchdowns: 7
- Stats at Pro Football Reference

John R. "Bo" Farrington (January 18, 1936 – July 27, 1964) was an American professional football player for the Chicago Bears of the National Football League (NFL). He attended Prairie View A&M University. Farrington made history with Bill Wade when (in Wade's first start as quarterback) he received a 98-yard touchdown pass on October 8, 1961.

Farrington was killed in an automobile accident on July 27, 1964, in Rensselaer, Indiana, at the age of 28, along with teammate Willie Galimore.

== See also ==
- List of gridiron football players who died during their careers
