= Doug Atkins =

American football player (1930–2015)

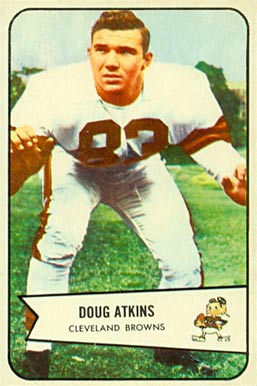
- Atkins on a 1954 Bowman football card

No. 83, 81
- Position: Defensive end

Personal information
- Born: May 8, 1930; Humboldt, Tennessee, U.S.
- Died: December 30, 2015 (aged 85); Knoxville, Tennessee, U.S.
- Listed height: 6 ft 8 in (2.03 m)
- Listed weight: 257 lb (117 kg)

Career information
- High school: Humboldt
- College: Tennessee (1950–1952)
- NFL draft: 1953: 1st round, 11th overall pick

Career history
- Cleveland Browns (1953–1954); Chicago Bears (1955–1966); New Orleans Saints (1967–1969)

Awards and highlights
- 2× NFL champion (1954, 1963); First-team All-Pro (1963); 6× Second-team All-Pro (1957–1960, 1965, 1968); 8× Pro Bowl (1957–1963, 1965); NFL 100th Anniversary All-Time Team; NFL 1960s All-Decade Team; 100 greatest Bears of All-Time; New Orleans Saints Hall of Fame; National champion (1951); First-team All-American (1952); 2× First-team All-SEC (1951, 1952); Tennessee Volunteers No. 91 retired

Career NFL statistics
- Sacks: 94.5
- Safeties: 1
- Fumble recoveries: 11
- Interceptions: 3
- Stats at Pro Football Reference
- Pro Football Hall of Fame
- College Football Hall of Fame

Douglas Leon Atkins (May 8, 1930 – December 30, 2015) was an American professional football defensive end who played for the Cleveland Browns, Chicago Bears, and New Orleans Saints in the National Football League (NFL). He played college football for the Tennessee Volunteers under head coach Robert Neyland. He is a member of the College Football Hall of Fame and the Pro Football Hall of Fame. Atkins was also drafted to the NBA in the 17th round by the Minneapolis Lakers in the 1953 NBA draft.

Atkins was a fierce defender who was known for using his immense size and agility to his advantage. At 6 feet 8 inches (2.03 m), Atkins often batted passes down at the line of scrimmage and used his skills as a high jump champion to leapfrog blockers and get to the quarterback. Atkins was one of the first great exclusively defensive players in professional football and, along with fellow Hall of Famer Gino Marchetti, revolutionized the defensive end position.

== Early life and college ==
Atkins was born May 8, 1930, in Humboldt, Tennessee. He attended Humboldt High School and played for the school's basketball team, which won the state championship in 1949 with an undefeated record. He enrolled at the University of Tennessee to play for the Tennessee Volunteers of the Southeastern Conference (SEC) on a basketball scholarship, but once American football head coach Robert Neyland saw his combination of size and agility, he was recruited for the football team. Atkins played on the 1951 Tennessee Volunteers football team that won the national championship. He earned All-America honors in 1952. Atkins is one of the few players in Tennessee history to have his number retired. He was considered one of the, if not the, most dominant defensive players in SEC history. Atkins was the only unanimous selection to the SEC All Quarter-Century team and was selected as the overall SEC "Player of the Quarter-Century" for the years 1950 to 1975. At Tennessee, Atkins also lettered in three seasons in track and field and one season in basketball. He finished runner-up in the high jump at the 1952 Southeastern Conference championships with a mark of 6 ft 6 in (1.98 m) which placed him 25th in the world that year.

== Professional career ==
The Cleveland Browns selected Atkins in the first round with the 11th overall selection in the 1953 NFL draft. He played his first two seasons in the NFL with the Browns, winning the NFL Eastern Conference in 1953, and the NFL Championship in 1954. The Browns traded Atkins and Ken Gorgal to the Chicago Bears for a third-round and a sixth-round pick in the 1956 NFL draft. According to Pat Summerall, Atkins was traded by Paul Brown for burping out loud in a team meeting. In Chicago, Atkins quickly became the leader of a devastating defensive unit. With the Bears, Atkins was a First-team All-Pro selection in 1958, 1960, 1961, and 1963, along with being a starter in the Pro Bowl in eight of his last nine years with Chicago. Atkins' reputation of being rebellious of authority continued in Chicago. Once, Atkins was ordered by a coach to run laps during practice and was told to wear his helmet while doing so, in the hot weather, as extra punishment. When the coach looked at Atkins again, he was running laps wearing only his helmet, having stripped himself of his uniform and pads.

At the 1966 Pro Bowl, Atkins announced his retirement from football. He changed his mind and signed with the Bears for the 1966 season. Before the 1967 season, Atkins requested a trade from Chicago and was traded to the New Orleans Saints. He suffered a fractured knee cap during the 1968 season. He retired after the 1969 season. On the final play of his NFL career, Atkins sacked Pittsburgh Steelers quarterback Dick Shiner, preserving the Saints' 27–24 victory in the 1969 season finale.

== NFL career statistics ==
Legend
	Won the NFL championship
	Led the league
**Bold**	Career high
Underline	Incomplete data

=== Regular season ===
Year	Team	Games		Tackles		Interceptions					Fumbles			
Year	Team	GP	GS	Sck	Sfty	Int	Yds	Y/I	Lng	TD	FR	Yds	Y/F	TD
1953	CLE	8	8	—	0	0	0	—	0	0	0	0	—	0
1954	CLE	12	3	—	0	0	0	—	0	0	0	0	—	0
1955	CHI	12	11	—	0	0	0	—	0	0	0	0	—	0
1956	CHI	6	1	—	0	0	0	—	0	0	0	0	—	0
1957	CHI	12	6	—	0	0	0	—	0	0	1	0	0.0	0
1958	CHI	12	12	—	0	0	0	—	0	0	**2**	**28**	**14.0**	0
1959	CHI	12	12	—	0	0	0	—	0	0	0	0	—	0
1960	CHI	12	12	9.5	0	0	0	—	0	0	1	6	6.0	0
1961	CHI	**14**	**14**	9.0	0	0	0	—	0	0	**2**	0	0.0	0
1962	CHI	**14**	10	10.5	0	0	0	—	0	0	**2**	0	0.0	0
1963	CHI	**14**	**14**	12.0	**1**	**1**	0	0.0	0	0	0	0	—	0
1964	CHI	12	11	5.0	0	0	0	—	0	0	0	0	—	0
1965	CHI	**14**	**14**	10.5	0	**1**	0	0.0	0	0	1	0	0.0	0
1966	CHI	12	12	8.0	0	**1**	**3**	**3.0**	**3**	0	0	0	—	0
1967	NO	**14**	11	9.5	0	0	0	—	0	0	1	0	0.0	0
1968	NO	11	11	**12.5**	0	0	0	—	0	0	0	0	—	0
1969	NO	**14**	**14**	8.0	0	0	0	—	0	0	1	0	0.0	0
Career		205	176	94.5	1	3	3	1.0	3	0	11	34	3.1	0

=== Postseason ===
Year	Team	Games		Sck
Year	Team	GP	GS	Sck
1953	CLE	1	0	—
1954	CLE	1	0	—
1956	CHI	1	0	—
1963	CHI	1	**1**	0.0
Career		4	1	0.0

== Legacy and honors ==
Atkins was inducted into the Pro Football Hall of Fame in 1982 and the College Football Hall of Fame in 1985. In 2019, he was selected to the NFL's 100th Anniversary All-Time Team. He has also been inducted into the Chicagoland Sports Hall of Fame. During John W. Mecom Jr.'s ownership of the Saints, his No. 81 was retired. However, it was unretired in 1993. His collegiate jersey number, No. 91, was retired by the University of Tennessee in 2005.

The NFL Network ranked him as the number 9 Pass Rusher of All Time in its Top Ten show. During a 1983 segment about Atkins on the NFL Films show "This Is the NFL", legendary narrator John Facenda described Atkins "like a storm rolling over a Kansas farmhouse. He came from all directions, and all there was to do was to tie down what you could, and hope he didn't take the roof".

Former NFL tackle Mike Tilleman called Atkins the best football player he had ever seen.

== Personal life ==
Atkins married twice. His first wife was from Humboldt, and he married his second wife, from Milan, Tennessee, after the death of his first wife. He played a minor acting role as "Jebbo" in the 1975 film, Breakheart Pass, starring Charles Bronson. After he retired from the NFL, Atkins worked in various jobs, including as an exterminator, as a pipe system manager, and selling caskets to funeral homes.

Atkins died of natural causes at Fort Sanders Regional Medical Center in Knoxville, Tennessee, on December 30, 2015, at the age of 85. He was survived by his wife, brother, and three sons.
