= Bill Wade =

American football player and coach (1930–2016)

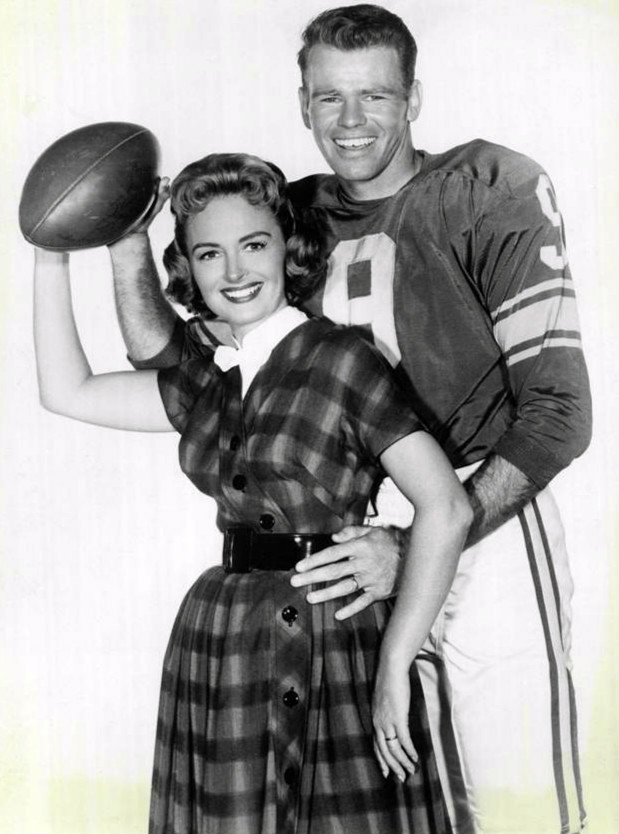
- Wade with Donna Reed, 1959

No. 9
- Position: Quarterback

Personal information
- Born: October 4, 1930; Nashville, Tennessee, U.S.
- Died: March 9, 2016 (aged 85); Nashville, Tennessee, U.S.
- Listed height: 6 ft 2 in (1.88 m)
- Listed weight: 202 lb (92 kg)

Career information
- High school: Montgomery Bell Academy (Nashville)
- College: Vanderbilt
- NFL draft: 1952: 1st round, 1st overall pick

Career history

Playing
- Los Angeles Rams (1954–1960); Chicago Bears (1961–1966)

Coaching
- Chicago Bears (1967) Quarterbacks coach

Awards and highlights
- NFL champion (1963); 2× Pro Bowl (1958, 1963); NFL passer rating leader (1961); NFL completion percentage leader (1959); 100 greatest Bears of All-Time; Second-team All-American (1951); SEC Player of the Year (1951); First-team All-SEC (1951); Second-team All-SEC (1950)

Career NFL statistics
- Passing attempts: 2,523
- Passing completions: 1,370
- Completion percentage: 54.3%
- Passing yards: 18,530
- TD–INT: 124–134
- Passer rating: 72.2
- Stats at Pro Football Reference

William James Wade Jr. (October 4, 1930 – March 9, 2016) was an American professional football player who was a quarterback in the National Football League (NFL) for the Los Angeles Rams (1954–1960) and Chicago Bears (1961–1966).

A native of Nashville, Tennessee, Wade played college football for the Vanderbilt Commodores from 1948 to 1951 and was selected as the most valuable player in the Southeastern Conference (SEC) in 1951. He was the first player selected in the 1952 NFL draft, though his professional career was delayed by two years of military service. During the 1958 season, he led the NFL in both total passing yards and passing yards per game. He was traded to the Chicago Bears in 1961 and led the 1963 Bears to the 1963 NFL championship, scoring both touchdowns for the Bears in the 1963 NFL Championship Game.

In 11 NFL seasons, Wade completed 1,370 of 2,523 passes (54.3%) for 18,530 yards with 124 touchdowns and 134 interceptions. He also tallied 1,334 rushing yards on 318 carries (4.2 yards per carry) and 24 rushing touchdowns.

== Early life ==
Wade was born in 1930 in Nashville, Tennessee. His father Pink Wade was the captain of the undefeated 1921 Vanderbilt Commodores football team.

Wade attended Montgomery Bell Academy in Nashville where he starred in tennis, football, baseball, and basketball. At age 14, he won the city boys' tennis championship. In December 1946, at age 16, he tallied 964 passing yards and was chosen by The Nashville Banner as the most valuable football player in the Interscholastic League. He was also selected as the Interscholastic League's most valuable baseball player in 1947, leading the league with a .533 batting average. He once struck out 21 batters in seven innings but turned down offers to play professional baseball. He also punted for the football team, averaging 44.0 yards a punt as a senior. Upon his graduation in June 1948, he was selected as the most outstanding boy and the best all-around athlete at the school.

== Vanderbilt ==
Wade played college football for Vanderbilt University from 1948 to 1951.

As a junior in 1950, Wade broke Vanderbilt's single-season passing record with 1,597 passing yards. He fell 31 yards short of Babe Parilli who set a new Southeastern Conference (SEC) record with 1,628 passing yards in 1950. On September 30, 1950, he led Vanderbilt to a 41–0 victory over Auburn and set a new SEC single-game record with five touchdown passes. At the end of the season, Wade was selected by both the Associated Press (AP) and United Press (UP) as the second-team quarterback (behind Babe Parilli) on the 1950 All-SEC football team.

As a senior in 1951, Wade completed 111 of 223 passes for 1,609 yards with 13 touchdowns and 10 interceptions. His 1,609 passing yards was 18 yards short of Parilli's SEC single-season record. He led the SEC and ranked third nationally with 1,643 yards of total offense. He received multiple awards and honors after the 1951 season:

- He was selected the Associated Press (AP) as a first-team player on the 1951 All-SEC football team.
- He was selected by the AP as a second-team player on the 1951 All-America college football team.
- He was named the SEC's most valuable player in a poll of the 12 conference coaches by The Nashville Banner. He defeated Kentucky quarterback Babe Parilli by a total of 68 points to 44 points.
- He was named most valuable player of the 1951 North–South Shrine Game in Miami, completing 11 of 18 passes for 224 yards and three touchdowns in the first 20 minutes of the game.

== Professional football ==
=== Los Angeles Rams ===
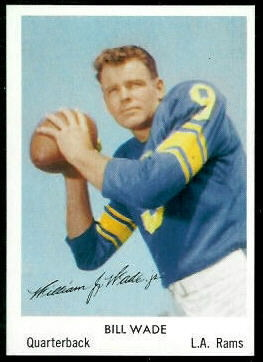
Wade in 1959

In January 1952, the Los Angeles Rams selected Wade as the first overall pick in the 1952 NFL draft. The Rams chose Wade even though he was committed to two years of military service in the Navy.

After completing his Navy service, Wade joined the Rams in 1954. He started one game in 1954 and otherwise served as a backup to Pro Football Hall of Famer Norm Van Brocklin, appearing in 10 games in 1954 and seven in 1955.

In 1956, Wade started eight of the Rams' 12 games and completed 91 of 178 passes (51.1%) for 1,461 yards with 10 touchdowns and 13 interceptions. He ranked second in the NFL in 1956 in both yards per pass attempt (8.2) and yards per pass completion (16.1).

Wade returned to a backup role in 1957 but won the starring job in 1958 after the departure of Van Brocklin. Wade had his best year statistically was 1958, when he led the NFL with 2,875 passing yards and an average of 239.6 yards per game. He also ranked second in the league with 18 passing touchdowns.

=== Chicago Bears ===
Wade was traded to the Bears in January 1961 in exchange for Erich Barnes and a player or draft pick to be named later.

Wade had his best season with the Bears in 1962. He led the NFL in pass completions (225) and ranked third in the league in passing yards (3,172 yards) and interceptions (24). On November 11, 1962, he threw for 466 passing yards against Dallas, two yards short of the Bears' single-game record. He was the first Bear to record four games with 300+ passing yards in a season.

In 1963, Wade led the Bears to an 11–1–2 record and victory and the NFL championship. Wade scored both Chicago touchdowns on quarterback sneaks in a 14–10 victory over the New York Giants in the 1963 NFL Championship Game played in freezing weather conditions at Wrigley Field.

Wade continued as one of the NFL's leading quarterbacks in 1964. He led the NFL with an average of 16.5 passes completed per game and ranked fourth in both passes completed (182) and completion percentage (55.7%).

Wade sustained a knee injury during an exhibition game prior to the 1965 season, spent the season as a backup to Rudy Bukich, and appeared in only five games, completing 20 of 41 passes for 204 yards. He underwent surgery in January 1966 and attempted a comeback, but appeared in only two games during the 1966 season, completing nine of 21 passes.

At the end of the 1966 season, Wade applied for the vacant head coaching position at Vanderbilt, but the job went to Bill Pace. Prior to the 1967 season, the Bears dropped Wade from the active roster, ending his NFL playing career at age 36. He compiled a 27-20-2 as the Bears' starting quarterback.

Wade remained with the Bears during the 1967 season as an assistant quarterback coach.

He was responsible for hosting a Monday night football broadcast at CBS in Nashville.

== NFL career statistics ==
Legend
	Won the NFL championship
	Led the league
**Bold**	Career high

=== Regular season ===
Year	Team	Games			Passing									Rushing					Sacks	
Year	Team	GP	GS	Record	Cmp	Att	Pct	Yds	Y/A	Lng	TD	Int	Rtg	Att	Yds	Avg	Lng	TD	Sck	Yds
1954	RAM	10	1	0-1	31	59	52.5	509	8.6	48	2	1	86.1	28	190	**6.8**	35	1	-	53
1955	RAM	7	0	0-0	31	71	43.7	316	4.5	25	1	3	44.1	11	43	3.9	14	0	-	69
1956	RAM	12	8	2-6	91	178	51.1	1,461	8.2	76	10	13	67.2	26	93	3.6	33	3	-	127
1957	RAM	5	0	0-0	10	24	41.7	116	4.8	35	1	1	53.5	1	5	5.0	5	0	-	136
1958	RAM	12	12	8-4	181	341	53.1	2,875	8.4	93	18	22	72.2	42	90	2.1	22	2	-	197
1959	RAM	12	9	2-7	153	261	**58.6**	2,001	7.7	72	12	17	71.1	25	95	3.8	17	2	-	124
1960	RAM	11	6	1-5	106	182	58.2	1,294	7.1	63	12	11	77.0	26	171	6.6	**66**	2	25	**257**
1961	CHI	13	9	5-4	139	250	55.6	2,258	**9.0**	**98**	**22**	13	**93.7**	**45**	**255**	5.7	29	2	**29**	251
1962	CHI	14	14	9-5	**225**	**412**	54.6	**3,172**	7.7	73	18	**24**	70.0	40	146	3.7	21	5	27	226
1963	CHI	14	14	**11-1-2**	192	356	53.9	2,301	6.5	63	15	12	74.0	**45**	132	2.9	17	**6**	19	164
1964	CHI	11	10	2-8	182	327	55.7	1,944	5.9	68	13	14	68.6	24	96	4.0	31	1	23	157
1965	CHI	5	2	0-2	20	41	48.8	204	5.0	29	0	2	43.1	5	18	3.6	16	0	5	40
1966	CHI	2	0	0-0	9	21	42.9	79	3.8	14	0	1	33.6	0	0	0.0	0	0	0	0
Career		128	85	40-43-2	1,370	2,523	54.3	18,530	7.3	98	124	134	72.2	318	1,334	4.2	66	24	128	1,801

=== Playoffs ===
Year	Team	Games			Passing									Rushing					Sacks	
Year	Team	GP	GS	Record	Cmp	Att	Pct	Yds	Y/A	Lng	TD	Int	Rtg	Att	Yds	Avg	Lng	TD	Sck	Yds
1955	RAM	1	0	0-0	0	3	0.0	0	0.0	0	0	**1**	0.0	1	4	4.0	4	0	-	**23**
1963	CHI	1	1	1-0	**10**	**28**	**35.7**	**138**	**4.9**	**34**	0	0	**52.4**	**8**	**34**	**4.3**	**12**	**2**	**1**	9
Career		2	1	1-0	10	31	32.3	138	4.5	34	0	1	34.1	9	38	4.2	12	2	1	32

== Personal life and later years ==
Wade met Sharon Townsend in 1954. They married and had four children: sons Bill and Don, and two daughters Lisa and Sharon. Their son Don died at age 31 in 1987. His marriage ended in divorce after 32 years.

In May 1968, Wade left the Bears to return to Nashville as public relations and trust official with Third National Bank. He remained with the bank as of 1976 and 1989.

In January 1977, Wade received the NCAA's Silver Anniversary Award. In 2008, he was named to the Vanderbilt Athletics Hall of Fame as part of its inaugural class.

In his later years, Wade had open-heart surgery and two knee replacements. He also lost his eyesight. He died in 2016 at age 85 in Nashville.
