= Gordon Smith (American football) =

American football player (born 1939)

No. 87
- Position: Tight end

Personal information
- Born: April 9, 1939 (age 87); Douglas, Arizona, U.S.
- Listed height: 6 ft 2 in (1.88 m)
- Listed weight: 220 lb (100 kg)

Career information
- High school: West (Phoenix, Arizona)
- College: Arizona State, Missouri
- NFL draft: 1961: undrafted

Career history

Playing
- Minnesota Vikings (1961–1965)

Coaching
- Arkansas (1966–1967) (assistant); Iowa State (1968–1970) (assistant)

Career NFL statistics
- Receptions: 57
- Receiving yards: 1277
- Touchdowns: 13
- Stats at Pro Football Reference

Gordon Chilton Smith (born April 9, 1939) is an American former professional football player who was a tight end for five seasons with the Minnesota Vikings of the National Football League (NFL) from 1961 to 1965. Smith played college football for the Arizona State Sun Devils and Missouri Tigers under head coach Dan Devine.

After retiring from playing, Smith became an assistant football coach at the University of Arkansas in 1966. In December 1967, he was hired as an assistant football coach at Iowa State University under new head coach, Johnny Majors with whom Smith worked as an assistant at Arkansas. Smith served as offensive coordinator at Iowa State before resigning after the 1970 season to take a job with the federal government.
