= Curt Gentry (American football) =

American football player and coach (1937–2022)

No. 46
- Position: Defensive back

Personal information
- Born: August 8, 1937; Waco, Kentucky, U.S.
- Died: October 29, 2022 (aged 85); Durham, North Carolina, U.S.
- Listed height: 6 ft 0 in (1.83 m)
- Listed weight: 185 lb (84 kg)

Career information
- High school: Portsmouth (Portsmouth, Ohio)
- College: Maryland Eastern Shore (1962-1965)
- NFL draft: 1966: 17th round, 257th overall pick

Career history

Playing
- Chicago Bears (1966–1968)

Coaching
- Holy Cross (1972) Assistant coach; Northwestern (1973–1975) Defensive backfield coach; Alabama A&M (1976) Head coach; North Carolina A&T (1977–1979) Assistant coach; Lincoln (1980) Head coach

Career NFL statistics
- Interceptions: 6
- Stats at Pro Football Reference

Head coaching record
- Career: 5–17–0 (.227)

Curtis William Gentry (August 8, 1937 – October 29, 2022) was an American professional football player and coach. He played professionally as a defensive back for three seasons in the National Football League (NFL) with the Chicago Bears. Gentry served as the head football coach at Alabama Agricultural and Mechanical University in 1976 and at Lincoln University in Jefferson City, Missouri in 1980.

Gentry died in Durham, North Carolina, on October 29, 2022, at the age of 85.

== Head coaching record ==
Year	Team	Overall	Conference	Standing	Bowl/playoffs
Alabama A&M Bulldogs (Southern Intercollegiate Athletic Conference) (1976)
1976	Alabama A&M	3–8	2–3	5th (Division I)	
Alabama A&M:		3–8	2–3		
Lincoln Blue Tigers (Missouri Intercollegiate Athletic Association) (1980)
1980	Lincoln	2–9	0–6	7th	
Lincoln:		2–9	0–6		
Total:		5–17			
