= Larry Glueck =

American football player and coach (1941–2025)

No. 43
- Position: Defensive back

Personal information
- Born: October 5, 1941; Norristown, Pennsylvania, U.S.
- Died: September 2, 2025 (aged 83); Falmouth, Massachusetts, U.S.
- Listed height: 6 ft 0 in (1.83 m)
- Listed weight: 190 lb (86 kg)

Career information
- High school: Lansdale Catholic (Lansdale, Pennsylvania)
- College: Villanova
- NFL draft: 1963: 3rd round, 38th overall pick
- AFL draft: 1963: 5th round, 34th overall pick

Career history

Playing
- Chicago Bears (1963–1965); Atlanta Falcons (1966)*
- * Offseason or practice squad member only

Coaching
- Villanova (1966–?) Assistant; Penn Assistant; Lehigh Assistant; Harvard (1973–1985) Assistant; Fordham (1986–1993) Head coach

Awards and highlights
- NFL champion (1963)

Career NFL statistics
- Interceptions: 1
- Stats at Pro Football Reference

Head coaching record
- Regular season: 30–51–1 (.372)
- Postseason: 1–2 (.333)
- Career: 31–53–1 (.371)

Lawrence David Glueck (October 5, 1941 – September 2, 2025) was an American professional football player who was a defensive back for three seasons with the Chicago Bears of the National Football League (NFL). Glueck played college football for the Villanova Wildcats, appearing in the 1961 Sun Bowl and the 1962 Liberty Bowl. He was selected by Chicago in the third round of the 1963 NFL draft and was part of the Bears' 1963 NFL Championship team.

Glueck died on September 2, 2025, at the age of 83.

He was inducted into the Fordham University Athletic Hall of Fame on September 25, 2026.

== Coaching career ==
Glueck was the head football coach for Fordham University from 1986 to 1993, and had previously served as an assistant coach at Harvard, Penn, Villanova and Lehigh.

== Head coaching record ==
Year	Team	Overall	Conference	Standing	Bowl/playoffs
Fordham Rams (Liberty Football Conference) (1986–1988)
1986	Fordham	4–5–1	3–1–1	2nd	
1987	Fordham	10–2	5–0	1st	L NCAA Division III Quarterfinal
1988	Fordham	9–2	5–1	T–1st	L ECAC South
Fordham Rams (NCAA Division I-AA independent) (1989)
1989	Fordham	2–6			
Fordham Rams (Patriot League) (1990–1993)
1990	Fordham	1–9	0–5	6th	
1991	Fordham	2–8	0–5	6th	
1992	Fordham	1–9	1–4	T–5th	
1993	Fordham	1–10	1–4	6th	
Fordham:		30–51–1	15–20–1		
Total:		30–51–1			
