= Charlie Bivins =

American football player (1938–1994)

No. 49, 36, 35
- Positions: Halfback, tight end

Personal information
- Born: October 16, 1938; Atlanta, Georgia, U.S.
- Died: March 11, 1994 (aged 55); Fulton County, Georgia, U.S.
- Listed height: 6 ft 1 in (1.85 m)
- Listed weight: 212 lb (96 kg)

Career information
- College: Morris Brown
- NFL draft: 1960: 7th round, 79th overall pick
- AFL draft: 1960

Career history
- Chicago Bears (1960–1966); Pittsburgh Steelers (1967); Buffalo Bills (1967)

Awards and highlights
- NFL champion (1963)

Career NFL/AFL statistics
- Rushing yards: 498
- Rushing average: 3.3
- Receptions: 28
- Receiving yards: 262
- Total touchdowns: 6
- Stats at Pro Football Reference

Charles Louis Bivins (October 16, 1938 – March 11, 1994) was an American professional football running back who played for the National Football League (NFL)'s Chicago Bears and Pittsburgh Steelers and the American Football League (AFL)'s Buffalo Bills. Bivins played college football at Morris Brown College.
