= Herman Lee =

American football player (1931–1991)

- Lee in 1964

No. 66, 72, 70
- Positions: Tackle, guard

Personal information
- Born: August 29, 1931; Phenix City, Alabama, U.S.
- Died: March 6, 1991 (aged 59); Phenix City, Alabama, U.S.
- Listed height: 6 ft 4 in (1.93 m)
- Listed weight: 244 lb (111 kg)

Career information
- High school: Central (Phenix City)
- College: Florida A&M (1951–1952)
- NFL draft: 1954: 23rd round, 270th overall pick

Career history
- Saskatchewan Roughriders (1956); Pittsburgh Steelers (1957); Chicago Bears (1958–1966)

Awards and highlights
- NFL champion (1963); 100 greatest Bears of All-Time

Career NFL statistics
- Games played: 127
- Games started: 121
- Fumble recoveries: 1
- Stats at Pro Football Reference

William Herman Lee (August 29, 1931 – March 6, 1991) was an American professional football player who was an offensive tackle in the National Football League (NFL). He played 10 seasons with the Pittsburgh Steelers (1957) and the Chicago Bears (1958–1966).
