= John Sisk Jr. =

American football player (born 1941)

John Sisk
No. 27
- Position: Defensive back

Personal information
- Born: July 15, 1941 (age 85); Milwaukee, Wisconsin, U.S.
- Listed height: 6 ft 3 in (1.91 m)
- Listed weight: 195 lb (88 kg)

Career information
- High school: Marquette (Milwaukee)
- College: Marquette (1959-1960); Miami (FL) (1962-1963)
- NFL draft: 1963: 17th round, 234th overall pick
- AFL draft: 1963: 29th round, 232nd overall pick

Career history
- Chicago Bears (1964)

Career NFL statistics
- Games played: 3
- Stats at Pro Football Reference

John Martin Sisk III (born July 15, 1941) is an American former professional football player who was a defensive back in the National Football League (NFL). He played in three games for the Chicago Bears in 1964. He played college football for the Marquette Warriors and Miami Hurricanes. His father, Johnny Sisk, played for the Bears from 1932 to 1936.

== See also ==
- List of Chicago Bears players
