= Bob Wetoska =

American football player (born 1937)

No. 63
- Positions: Tackle, guard, center

Personal information
- Born: August 22, 1937 (age 89); Minneapolis, Minnesota, U.S.
- Listed height: 6 ft 3 in (1.91 m)
- Listed weight: 240 lb (109 kg)

Career information
- High school: DeLaSalle (Minneapolis)
- College: Notre Dame
- NFL draft: 1959: 5th round, 49th overall pick

Career history
- Chicago Bears (1960–1969)

Awards and highlights
- NFL champion (1963); Second-team All-Pro (1965); 100 greatest Bears of All-Time

Career NFL statistics
- Games played: 128
- Games started: 84
- Fumble recoveries: 3
- Stats at Pro Football Reference

Robert Stephen Wetoska (born August 22, 1937) is an American former professional football player who was an offensive tackle for ten seasons in the National Football League (NFL) for the Chicago Bears. He played college football for the Notre Dame Fighting Irish and was selected in the fifth round of the 1959 NFL draft by the Washington Redskins.

== Personal life ==
Wetoska is of Polish descent.
