= Bob Kilcullen =

American football player (1936–2019)

No. 84, 74
- Positions: Defensive tackle, defensive end, offensive tackle

Personal information
- Born: May 13, 1936; St. Louis, Missouri, U.S.
- Died: August 24, 2019 (aged 83); Denver, Colorado, U.S.
- Listed height: 6 ft 3 in (1.91 m)
- Listed weight: 245 lb (111 kg)

Career information
- College: Texas Tech
- NFL draft: 1957: 8th round, 96th overall pick

Career history
- Chicago Bears (1957–1966)

Awards and highlights
- NFL champion (1963)

Career NFL statistics
- Fumble recoveries: 5
- Sacks: 14.5
- Stats at Pro Football Reference

Bob Kilcullen (May 13, 1936 – August 24, 2019) was an American defensive lineman who played ten seasons in the National Football League (NFL) for the Chicago Bears. He was selected by the Bears in the eighth round of the 1957 NFL draft.

== Athletic career ==
Kilcullen played at Texas Technological College (now Texas Tech University) in college. While playing football he majored in art at the university.

== Life after football ==
Following a ten-year career in the NFL, Kilcullen returned to Dallas, where he was instrumental in establishing the Dallas Arts Center. Kilcullen continued to work as an artist himself, working in the media of oil painting, charcoal, and bronze sculpture.

Kilcullen died on August 24, 2019, at the age of 83.
