= Jim Cadile =

American football player (born 1940)

No. 72, 64
- Positions: Guard, tackle

Personal information
- Born: July 16, 1940; San Jose, California, U.S.
- Died: March 11, 2026 (aged 85); Medford, Oregon, U.S.
- Listed height: 6 ft 4 in (1.93 m)
- Listed weight: 240 lb (109 kg)

Career information
- High school: San José
- College: San Jose State
- NFL draft: 1962: 4th round, 49th overall pick
- AFL draft: 1962: 22nd round, 169th overall pick

Career history

Playing
- Chicago Bears (1962–1972); The Hawaiians (1974-1975)

Coaching
- Denver Gold (1984) Offensive line coach

Awards and highlights
- NFL champion (1963)

Career NFL statistics
- Games played: 128
- Games started: 107
- Fumble recoveries: 5
- Stats at Pro Football Reference

James Dee Cadile (July 16, 1940 – March 11, 2026) was an American former professional football player who was an offensive guard for the Chicago Bears of the National Football League (NFL). He played college football for the San Jose State Spartans after attending San José High School. Cadile played 11 years in the NFL, all for the Bears. He played for the Hawaiians of the World Football League during the 1974 and 1975 seasons.

Cadile died on March 11, 2026, at the age of 85.
