= John Johnson (defensive tackle) =

American football player (1941–2025)

No. 76, 75
- Position: Defensive tackle

Personal information
- Born: July 5, 1941; Gary, Indiana, U.S.
- Died: February 20, 2025 (aged 83); Chicago, Illinois, U.S.
- Listed height: 6 ft 5 in (1.96 m)
- Listed weight: 260 lb (118 kg)

Career information
- High school: Hobart (Hobart, Indiana)
- College: Indiana
- NFL draft: 1963: 6th round, 80th overall pick
- AFL draft: 1963: 20th round, 155th overall pick

Career history
- Chicago Bears (1963–1968); New York Giants (1969)

Awards and highlights
- NFL champion (1963)

Career NFL statistics
- Fumble recoveries: 2
- Sacks: 2
- Stats at Pro Football Reference

John Howard Johnson (July 5, 1941 – February 20, 2025) was an American professional football player who was a defensive tackle for seven seasons with the Chicago Bears and the New York Giants of the National Football League (NFL). He played college football for the Indiana Hoosiers. Johnson died on February 20, 2025, at the age of 83.
