= Mike Rabold =

American football player (born 1937)

No. 64, 65
- Position: Guard

Personal information
- Born: March 12, 1937; Chicago, Illinois, U.S.
- Died: October 13, 1970 (aged 33); Greenwood, Indiana, U.S.
- Listed height: 6 ft 2 in (1.88 m)
- Listed weight: 239 lb (108 kg)

Career information
- High school: Fenwick (Oak Park, Illinois)
- College: Indiana
- NFL draft: 1959: 2nd round, 19th overall pick

Career history
- Detroit Lions (1959); St. Louis Cardinals (1960); Minnesota Vikings (1961–1962); Chicago Bears (1964–1967)

Awards and highlights
- Second-team All-Big Ten (1958)

Career NFL statistics
- Games played: 105
- Games started: 63
- Fumble recoveries: 5
- Stats at Pro Football Reference

Michael Rabold (March 12, 1937 -October 13, 1970) was an American professional football offensive guard who played eight years in the National Football League (NFL). He played college football at Indiana University Bloomington and finished second in the 1958 voting for the Chicago Tribune Silver Football award. He died in a car crash in 1970.
