= Roger LeClerc (American football) =

American football player and coach (1936–2021)

Roger Leclerc
No. 54, 83, 53
- Positions: Center, linebacker, placekicker

Personal information
- Born: October 1, 1936; Springfield, Massachusetts, U.S.
- Died: January 21, 2021 (aged 84)
- Listed height: 6 ft 3 in (1.91 m)
- Listed weight: 235 lb (107 kg)

Career information
- High school: Agawam (Agawam, Massachusetts)
- College: Trinity (CT)
- NFL draft: 1959: 15th round, 177th overall pick
- AFL draft: 1960: 1st round

Career history

Playing
- Chicago Bears (1960–1966); Denver Broncos (1967)

Coaching
- Hartford Knights (1968–1970) Assistant coach; Hartford Knights (1971) Offensive line coach; Westfield State (1982) Head coach; Westfield State (1983) Wide receivers coach

Awards and highlights
- NFL champion (1963); First-team Little All-American (1959); First-team All-Eastern (1959)

Career NFL/AFL statistics
- Field goals made: 76
- Field goals attempted: 152
- Interceptions: 1
- Fumble recoveries: 4
- Stats at Pro Football Reference

Roger Alvin Leclerc (October 1, 1936 – January 21, 2021) was an American professional football player in the National Football League (NFL). He played as a center, linebacker, and kicker and coached at the college level for one season.

== Playing career ==
LeClerc played seven seasons for the Chicago Bears and one for the Denver Broncos in the National Football League (NFL). He was primarily the placekicker in an era when straight ahead kicking under 50 yards was the preferred style. During his playing career, the soccer style kicking that is familiar today was already being used by teams. At the time of his retirement, he was the second leading scorer in team history for years with 377 points. His best season was 1965.

== Coaching career ==
LeClerc was the head football coach at Westfield State University in Westfield, Massachusetts for one season, in 1982, compiling a record of 2–7.

Coached golf at Agawam high school 1974–75.

== Later life ==
After he retired, LeClerc was a math teacher in Agawam, Massachusetts school system for 30 years. His son played college football as a quarterback at the University of New Hampshire.

LeClerc died on January 21, 2021.

== Head coaching record ==
Year	Team	Overall	Conference	Standing	Bowl/playoffs
Westfield State Owls (New England Football Conference) (1982)
1982	Westfield State	2–7	2–7	T–8th	
Westfield State:		2–7	2–7		
Total:		2–7			
