= Ed O'Bradovich =

American gridiron football player (born 1940)

No. 77, 71, 87
- Position: Defensive end

Personal information
- Born: May 21, 1940 (age 86); Hillside, Illinois, U.S.
- Listed height: 6 ft 3 in (1.91 m)
- Listed weight: 255 lb (116 kg)

Career information
- High school: Proviso East (Maywood, Illinois)
- College: Illinois
- NFL draft: 1962: 7th round, 91st overall pick

Career history
- Calgary Stampeders (1961); BC Lions (1961); Chicago Bears (1962–1971)

Awards and highlights
- NFL champion (1963)

Career NFL statistics
- Fumble recoveries: 13
- Sacks: 51.5
- Safeties: 1
- Stats at Pro Football Reference

Edward O'Bradovich (born May 21, 1940) is an American former professional football player who was a defensive end in the National Football League (NFL) and Canadian Football League (CFL). He was selected by the Chicago Bears in the seventh round (91st pick) of the 1962 NFL draft. In 2019, he was named one of the 100 greatest Bears of All-Time. He attended Proviso East High School in Maywood, Illinois and the University of Illinois.

O'Bradovich has the unusual distinction shared with not a small number of professional athletes who grew up, attended college, and enjoyed a long professional career in the same state. "OB", as he was known throughout his career, grew up in Hillside, IL, attended the University of Illinois and played much of his career for the Bears. Perhaps the singular professional career distinction was when he intercepted a short pass in the 1963 NFL Championship game and rumbled down the field on a key play for a Bears victory. Before joining the Bears, he played in the CFL for the BC Lions and the Calgary Stampeders.

He eventually started co-hosting the Suburban Tire Post Game Show after Bears games, alongside the late Bear Doug Buffone on WSCR in Chicago and lives in Palatine, IL. In May 2009, O'Bradovich and Buffone left WSCR-AM and joined Chicago Sports Webio. However, in June 2009, the founder of Chicago Sports Webio was charged with operating a Ponzi scheme, and the site was shut down. O'Bradovich and Buffone re-signed with the Score in late August 2009. O'Bradovich began broadcasting Chicago Rush Arena Football League games for Comcast SportsNet and WGN in 2010. Following his retirement, O'Bradovich has closely followed the Bears, giving the Pro Football Hall of Fame induction speeches for both Dan Hampton and Mike Ditka.

O'Bradovich played himself in the television movies Brian's Song, starring James Caan as Brian Piccolo, and Coach of the Year, starring Robert Conrad as former Chicago Bears player Jim Brandon.

He is of Serbian descent. According to O'Bradovich, his father changed the family's surname from Obradović because so many people in their home country had the same name, frequently causing the mail to be mixed up.
