= Bob Jencks =

American football player (1941–2010)

No. 80, 81
- Positions: Tight end, Placekicker

Personal information
- Born: July 15, 1941; Columbus, Ohio, U.S.
- Died: September 6, 2010 (aged 69); Manchester, New Hampshire, U.S.
- Listed height: 6 ft 5 in (1.96 m)
- Listed weight: 227 lb (103 kg)

Career information
- High school: Upper Arlington (Upper Arlington, Ohio)
- College: Miami (OH) (1959–1962)
- NFL draft: 1963: 2nd round, 25th overall pick
- AFL draft: 1963: 5th round, 36th overall pick

Career history
- Chicago Bears (1963–1964); Washington Redskins (1965); Atlanta Falcons (1966)*; Los Angeles Rams (1967)*
- * Offseason or practice squad member only

Awards and highlights
- NFL champion (1963)

Career NFL statistics
- Field goals made: 14
- Field goal attempts: 39
- Field goal %: 35.9
- Receptions: 3
- Receiving yards: 26
- Stats at Pro Football Reference

Robert William Jencks (July 15, 1941 – September 6, 2010) was an American professional football player who was a kicker and end in the National Football League (NFL) for the Chicago Bears and the Washington Redskins. He played college football for the Miami RedHawks and was selected in the second round of the 1963 NFL draft. Jencks was also chosen in the fifth round of the 1963 AFL draft by the Buffalo Bills. His rookie season was 1963, when the Bears defeated the New York Giants for the team's first NFL title since 1946.

Jencks was born in Columbus, Ohio and died in Manchester, New Hampshire, where he had lived for many years.
