= 1963 NFL Championship Game =

Coordinates: 41.948°N 87.656°W

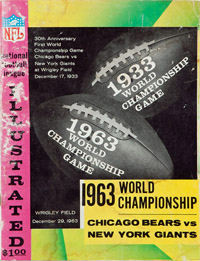
New York Giants (Eastern) (11–3)	Chicago Bears (Western) (11–1–2)
10	14
Head coach: Allie Sherman	Head coach: George Halas
	1	2	3	4	Total
NYG	7	3	0	0	10
CHI	7	0	7	0	14
- Date: December 29, 1963
- Stadium: Wrigley Field; Chicago, Illinois
- MVP: Larry Morris (Linebacker; Chicago)
- Referee: Norm Schachter
- Attendance: 45,801

TV in the United States
- Network: NBC
- Announcers: Jack Brickhouse; Chris Schenkel; George Connor

Radio in the United States
- Network: NBC
- Announcers: Jim Gibbons; Pat Summerall

Location in the United States

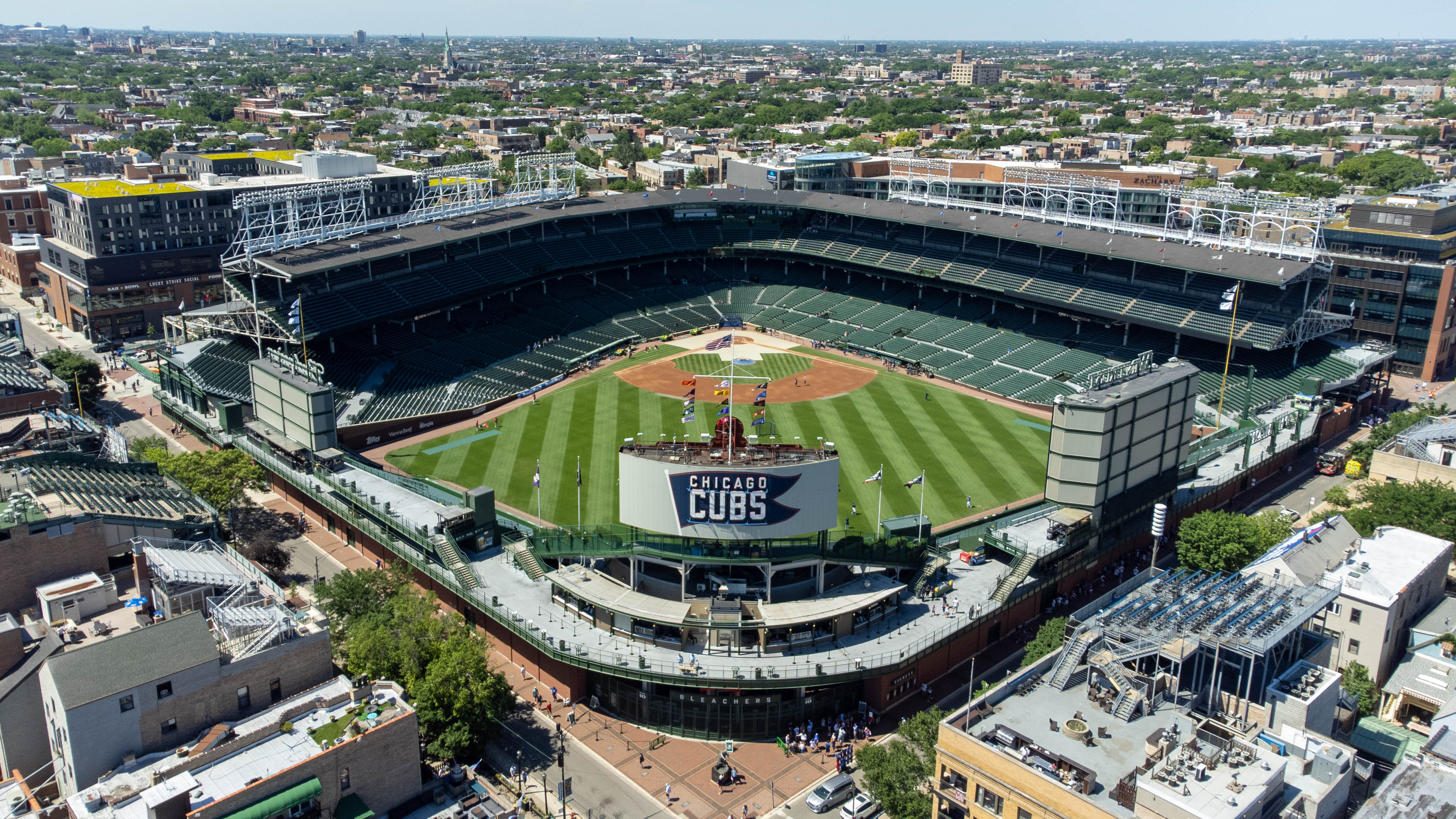
Wrigley Field in Chicago, Illinois (photographed in 2022), the site of the 1963 NFL Championship Game

The 1963 NFL Championship Game was the 31st annual championship game, played on December 29 at Wrigley Field in Chicago, Illinois. The game pitted the visiting New York Giants (11–3) of the Eastern Conference against the Chicago Bears (11–1–2) of the Western Conference.

Originally, NFL Commissioner Pete Rozelle had asked Bears owner/coach George Halas to move the game to Soldier Field due to its higher seating capacity and lights, and the possibility the game could extend into multiple overtime periods; Wrigley Field did not have lights until 1988.

After Halas declined the request, Rozelle moved the game's starting time up to 12:05 p.m. CST for increased daylight, similar to the situation in 1960 at Franklin Field. The Championship Game was played in temperatures under 10 °F (−12 °C).

The Giants were in their third consecutive championship game and fifth in the last six seasons. They lost to the Baltimore Colts in 1958 and 1959, and the Green Bay Packers in 1961 and 1962. The Bears were in their first Championship Game since a loss to the Giants in 1956 at Yankee Stadium, and had last won in 1946, defeating the Giants at the Polo Grounds.

This was the fifth and final NFL Championship Game at Wrigley Field, which hosted the first in 1933, as well as 1937, 1941, and 1943. The Bears won four, with the only loss in 1937.

Tickets were $12.50, $10, and $6. NBC paid the league $926,000 for the broadcast rights.

== Background ==
This was the ninth meeting between teams from Chicago and New York City for a major professional sports championship. This previously occurred in three World Series (1917, 1932, 1938), and five previous NFL Championship games (1933, 1934, 1941, 1946, 1956).

The Giants, coached by Allie Sherman, were known for their powerful offense, which scored 448 points in 14 games. They were led by quarterback Y. A. Tittle who threw 36 touchdown passes during the season, then an NFL record. Other contributing players on offense were Pro Bowlers Del Shofner and Frank Gifford. Wide receiver Shofner caught 64 passes for 1,181 yards and 9 touchdowns. Flanker Gifford had 42 receptions for 657 yards and 7 touchdowns. Formerly a star halfback, he had switched to the flanker position in 1962, having sat out the 1961 season following a devastating hit by linebacker Chuck Bednarik in November 1960. The Giants also used a plethora of players at running back, with the main two being Phil King and Joe Morrison. Although neither one had significant individual statistics, they combined for 1,181 rushing yards and 6 touchdowns.

The Giants defense allowed 280 points, ranking fifth overall in the 14-team NFL. This group was led by future Pro Football Hall of Fame linebacker Sam Huff. Other contributing players on defense were defensive linemen, Jim Katcavage, and John LoVetere; linebacker Tom Scott; and defensive backs Erich Barnes and Dick Lynch.

Meanwhile, the Bears were known for their defense, nicknamed the Monsters of the Midway. Led by defensive coordinator George Allen, this unit yielded 144 points in 14 games. The defensive line consisted of Ed O'Bradovich, Fred Williams, Stan Jones, and future hall of famer Doug Atkins. The linebacking corps was led by Joe Fortunato, Bill George, and Larry Morris, while the defensive backs were led by Richie Petitbon and Rosey Taylor. Accomplishments by the Bears defense during the regular season included making 36 pass interceptions, surrendering only 1 touchdown in two games versus the Green Bay Packers, and not allowing any passing touchdowns in its two games against quarterback Johnny Unitas and the Baltimore Colts. Writers in New York were especially fearful of the trio at linebacker, stating that Tittle had yet to see a group like them all year.

Chicago's offense did not come close to the Giants' in terms of points scored or yards gained. The group only scored 301 points, ranking 10th out of the league's then-14 teams. The offense was led by quarterback Bill Wade, the first overall pick of the 1952 NFL draft. Wade ran a simplified game plan, nicknamed "three yards and a cloud of dust," in which they would play it safe by running the ball or tossing short passes to the ends or backs instead of risking giving up an interception. Wade threw almost as many passes as Tittle in 1963 - 356 vs. 367 - but Y.A. favored longer throws, as evidenced by 8.6 yards-per-attempt vs. Wade's 6.5. Wade's favorite targets were tight end Mike Ditka and wide receiver, Johnny Morris.

The Giants entered the title game as slight favorites.

== Game summary ==
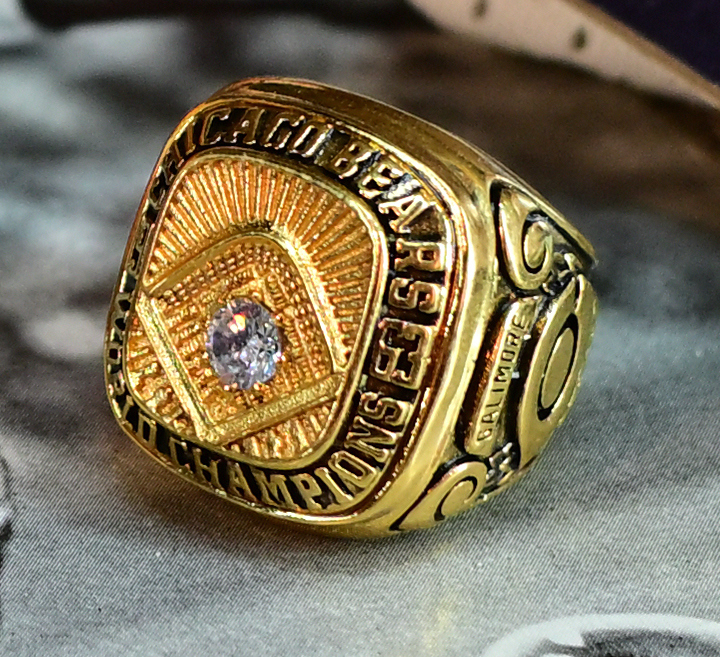
Championship ring from the Bears' victory

The Giants opened the scoring in the first quarter when Tittle led New York on a 41-yard drive capped off by a 14-yard touchdown pass to Frank Gifford. The drive was set up by Billy Wade's fumble on the Bears' 41-yard line, which was recovered by former Bear Erich Barnes. Later in the first period, Larry Morris hit Tittle's left knee with his helmet as the quarterback threw. The injured Tittle was much less effective for the rest of the game. After Del Shofner failed to hang onto a Tittle pass in the end zone, Morris intercepted Tittle's screen pass and returned the ball 61 yards to the Giants' 6-yard line. Two plays later, Wade scored a touchdown on a two-yard quarterback sneak to tie the game at 7.

In the second quarter, the Giants retook the lead, 10–7, on a 13-yard field goal. But on New York's next drive, Tittle reinjured his left knee on another hit by Morris. With Tittle out for two possessions, the Giants struggled, only able to advance 2 yards in 7 plays. Allie Sherman even punted on third down, showing no confidence in backup Glynn Griffing. The score remained 10–7 at halftime.

Tittle came back in the third period, but needed cortisone, Novocaine, and heavy taping and bandaging to continue. For the rest of the game, he was forced to throw off his back foot (poor mechanics for a quarterback). An interception on another screen pass by the Bears' Ed O'Bradovich was brought deep into Giant territory, setting up Wade's 1-yard touchdown to give Chicago a 14–10 lead. The score held up, and the Bears iced the game on Richie Petitbon's interception in the end zone with 10 seconds left. It was Tittle's 5th interception. Defensive coordinator George Allen was given the game ball due to his defense's spectacular play. Tittle was held to only 11 completions in 29 attempts, and the Bears' superior scouting and preparation were evidenced by their success defending against the Giants' screen passes.

Although the young American Football League (AFL) was completing its fourth season, the NFL still regarded itself as the premiere professional league of American football, as reflected in WGN radio broadcaster Jack Quinlan's comment as the clock ticked to zero on the final play: "The Chicago Bears are world's champions of professional football!" It was both the Bears' and the city of Chicago's last championship until the Bears won Super Bowl XX in 1986 who were coached by Mike Ditka who was a tight end on the 1963 Bears team.

=== Scoring summary ===
Chicago Bears 14, New York Giants 10

Quarter	1	2	3	4	Total
Giants	7	3	0	0	10
Bears	7	0	7	0	14

at Wrigley Field, Chicago, Illinois

- Date: December 29, 1963
- Game time: 12:05 p.m. CST
- Game weather: 4 °F (−16 °C), wind 11 mph (18 km/h), wind chill −11 °F (−24 °C), relative humidity 60%
- Pro-Football-Reference

Game information
- First quarter
  - NYG – Frank Gifford 14-yard pass from Y. A. Tittle (Don Chandler kick), 7:38. Giants 7–0
  - CHI – Bill Wade 2-yard yard run (Bob Jencks kick), :16. Tied 7–7
- Second quarter
  - NYG – Don Chandler 13-yard field goal, 9:49. Giants 10–7
- Third quarter
  - CHI – Bill Wade 1-yard run (Jencks kick), 2:12. Bears 14–10
- Fourth quarter
  - no scoring

Top passers

- NYG – Y. A. Tittle – 11/29, 147 yards, 1 TD, 5 INT
- CHI – Bill Wade – 10/28, 138 yards

Top rushers

- NYG – Joe Morrison – 18 rushes, 61 yards
- CHI – Ronnie Bull – 13 rushes, 42 yards

Top receivers

- NYG – Aaron Thomas – 2 receptions, 46 yards
- CHI – Joe Marconi – 3 receptions, 64 yards

== Officials ==
- Referee: (56) Norm Schachter
- Umpire: (15) Ralph Morcroft
- Head linesman: (36) Dan Tehan
- Back judge: (47) Ralph Vandenberg
- Field judge: (21) Fred Swearingen
- Alternate: Art McNally
- Alternate: Herman Rohrig
- Alternate: Jack Nix

The NFL had five game officials in 1963; the line judge was added in 1965 and the side judge in 1978.

== Players' shares ==
The gate receipts for the game were about $500,000 and the television money was $926,000. For the first time, the NFL tried a closed-circuit telecast in the local blackout area, with 26,000 viewing on large screens in four locations: McCormick Place, International Amphitheatre, Chicago Coliseum, and Chicago Stadium; tickets ranged from $4 to $7.50. Gross receipts were $1,493,954, with $35,402 from the closed-circuit telecast.

Each player on the winning Bears team received $5,899, while Giants players made $4,218 each. Both were a record, each a slight increase over the previous year's championship game at Yankee Stadium, despite a significantly lower attendance due to the venue.

== See also ==
- 1963 NFL season
- 1963 American Football League Championship Game
- History of the NFL championship
- Bears–Giants rivalry
