= 1972 Cleveland Browns season =

NFL team season

- General manager: Harold Sauerbrei
- Head coach: Nick Skorich
- Home stadium: Cleveland Stadium

Results
- Record: 10–4
- Division place: 2nd AFC Central
- Playoffs: Lost Divisional Playoffs (at Dolphins) 14–20
- Pro Bowlers: None

The 1972 Cleveland Browns season was the team's 23rd season with the National Football League. The Browns, after losing all six of their preseason games, finished at 10–4 which qualified the team for the NFL Playoffs as a Wild Card. In the Divisional Playoffs they played the undefeated Miami Dolphins and held a one-point lead in the 4th quarter. But a late Dolphins touchdown put them up for good, and the Browns lost 20–14.

For the first time since joining the league, the Browns had no players selected to the Pro Bowl.

Their week 2 game against the Eagles, which was a 27–17 win, as well as their first of ten on the season, marked head coach Nick Skorich's only return to Philadelphia after having been the head coach of the Eagles from 1961 to 1963.

== Offseason ==
1972 Cleveland Browns draft
Round	Pick	Player	Position	College	Notes
1	18	Thom Darden *	Defensive back	Michigan	
2	45	Clifford Brooks	Defensive back	Tennessee State	
2	51	Lester Sims	Defensive end	Alabama	
5	122	George Hunt	Kicker	Tennessee	
5	128	Greg Kucera	Running back	Northern Colorado	
6	149	Leonard Forey	Guard	Texas A&M	
7	174	Don Wesley	Tackle	Maryland Eastern Shore	
8	201	Hugh McKinnis	Running back	Arizona State	Made roster in 1973
9	226	Larry McKee	Guard	Arizona	
9	230	Billy Lefear	Running back	Henderson State	
10	253	Herschell Mosier	Defensive tackle	Northwestern Oklahoma State	
11	278	Mel Long	Linebacker	Toledo	
12	305	Bernie Chapman	Defensive back	UTEP	
13	330	Brian Sipe *	Quarterback	San Diego State	made practice squad
14	357	Ed Stewart	Guard	East Central	
15	382	Jewel McCuller	Linebacker	Chico State	
16	409	Richard Wakefield	Wide receiver	Ohio State	
17	434	Bill Portz	Defensive back	Sterling	
Made roster * Made at least one Pro Bowl during career

== Staff ==
1972 Cleveland Browns staff
Front office: Owner - Art Modell; General Manager - Harold Sauerbrei; Equipment Manager - Morrie Kono; Assistant Equipment Manager - Bob Glenn; Head coaches: Head Coach – Nick Skorich; Offensive coaches: Offensive Coordinator - Nick Skorich; Offensive Line - Ray Prochaska; Offensive Backs - John David Crow; Wide Receivers - Fran Polsfoot	Defensive coaches: Defensive Coordinator/Linebackers - Howard Brinker; Defensive Line - Dick Modzelewski; Film Coordinator - Ed Ulinski; Secondary - Richie McCabe; Special teams coaches: Special Teams Coach - Alva Tabor; Strength and conditioning: Trainer - Leo Murphy; Equipment Manager - Morris Kono; Team Physician - Vic Ippolito

== Roster ==
1972 Cleveland Browns roster
Quarterbacks (QB): 16 Bill Nelsen; 15 Mike Phipps; Running backs (RB): 30 Ken Brown; 33 Bo Cornell; 44 Leroy Kelly; 19 Billy Lefear; 35 Bo Scott; Wide receivers (WR): 43 Fair Hooker; 25 Frank Pitts; 42 Gloster Richardson; 85 Paul Staroba; Tight ends (TE): 83 Chip Glass; 89 Milt Morin	Offensive linemen (OL): 63 Joe Carollo T; 61 Bob DeMarco C; 65 John Demarie G/T; 73 Doug Dieken T; 54 Fred Hoaglin C; 66 Gene Hickerson G; 78 Bob McKay T; 62 Chris Morris T/G; Defensive linemen (DL): 84 Bob Briggs DE; 87 Rich Jackson DE; 71 Walter Johnson DT; 81 Nick Roman DE; 72 Jerry Sherk DT	Linebackers (LB): 52 Billy Andrews OLB; 50 John Garlington OLB; 59 Charlie Hall OLB; 82 Jim Houston OLB; 58 Rick Kingrea MLB; 51 Dale Lindsey MLB; 53 Mel Long OLB; Defensive backs (DB): 23 Clifford Brooks CB; 27 Thom Darden FS; 28 Ben Davis CB; 24 Bobby Majors SS; 22 Clarence Scott CB; 29 Walt Sumner SS; Special teams (ST): 12 Don Cockroft K/P	Practice squad: 47 Cookie Brinkman WR; 77 Fest Cotton DT; -- George Hunt K; -- Bill Portz S; 17 Brian Sipe QB; 79 George Wright DT; 67 Craig Wycinsky G; Reserve: 64 Jim Copeland G (IR); 80 Joe Jones DE (IR); 68 Bubba Pena G (IR); -- Lester Sims DE (IR); 88 Ron Snidow DE (IR); Rookies in italics

== Season summary ==
1972 marked the end of a nine-year span in which the Browns made the playoffs seven times; it would be the Browns' last playoff appearance until 1980.

The 1972 Cleveland Browns not only made it to the postseason as a wild card team with a 10–4 record, but also nearly pulled off what would have been one of the biggest upsets in team and NFL playoff history. Playing in the AFC divisional round in Miami against a Dolphins team that would go 17–0 and win the Super Bowl, the Browns lost 20–14 after blowing a 14–13 lead midway through the fourth quarter.

The Browns started the year with veteran quarterback Bill Nelsen as their starter; Nelsen had arrived from the Pittsburgh Steelers in a 1968 trade. But Nelsen, who had knee problems, struggled early, and the team followed suit by getting off to a rocky 2–3 start. The move was made to start Mike Phipps, drafted in 1970 with the No.3 overall pick the Browns obtained by trading Pro Football Hall of Fame wide receiver Paul Warfield to Miami. Although Phipps didn't have a very good year statistically—he completed only 47.2 percent of his passes and threw for just 13 touchdowns with 16 interceptions—he was able to make plays when he had to.

The Browns were only 2–3 and had been outscored 48–7 in their last two games, and 74–17 in their three losses, before a six-game winning streak ensued. Included in the streak was a last-second, 26–24 comeback win at home over the Steelers, who were trying to win the AFC Central title and make the playoffs for the second time in franchise history and first time since 1947. The Browns finished second to the Steelers (11–3) by a game after winning eight of their last nine contests, the only loss being a 30–0 decision in the rematch in Pittsburgh. The Browns also turned back the Denver Broncos on the road 27–20.

Pro Football Hall of Fame running back Leroy Kelly, in his last productive season, rushed for 811 yards. Wide receiver Frank Pitts led the team in receptions with 36, good for eight touchdowns—or 62 percent of the team total of 13. But it was primarily the defense that saved the season for the Browns. The unit gave up over 30 points only twice all year, posted a shutout and kept foes to 17 points or less eight times.

== Exhibition schedule ==
Week	Date	Opponent	Result	Record	Venue	Attendance
1	August 4	at Los Angeles Rams	L 3–13	0–1	Los Angeles Memorial Coliseum	64,803
2	August 13	at San Francisco 49ers	L 13–20	0–2	Candlestick Park	58,364
3	August 20	at Detroit Lions	L 7–34	0–3	Tiger Stadium	58,422
4	August 26	Minnesota Vikings	L 17–20	0–4	Cleveland Municipal Stadium	70,583
5	September 3	vs. Cincinnati Bengals	L 17–27	0–5	Ohio Stadium	84,816
6	September 10	at New York Giants	L 13–27	0–6	Yankee Stadium	60,152

== Schedule ==
Week	Date	Opponent	Result	Record	Venue	Attendance	Recap
1	September 17	Green Bay Packers	**L** 10–26	0–1	Cleveland Municipal Stadium	75,771	Recap
2	September 24	at Philadelphia Eagles	**W** 27–17	1–1	Veterans Stadium	65,720	Recap
3	October 1	**Cincinnati Bengals**	**W** 27–6	2–1	Cleveland Municipal Stadium	81,564	Recap
4	October 8	Kansas City Chiefs	**L** 7–31	2–2	Cleveland Municipal Stadium	83,819	Recap
5	October 15	Chicago Bears	**L** 0–17	2–3	Cleveland Municipal Stadium	72,339	Recap
6	October 22	at **Houston Oilers**	**W** 23–17	3–3	Houston Astrodome	38,113	Recap
7	October 29	at Denver Broncos	**W** 27–20	4–3	Mile High Stadium	51,656	Recap
8	November 5	**Houston Oilers**	**W** 20–0	5–3	Cleveland Municipal Stadium	61,985	Recap
9	November 13	at San Diego Chargers	**W** 21–17	6–3	San Diego Stadium	54,205	Recap
10	November 19	**Pittsburgh Steelers**	**W** 26–24	7–3	Cleveland Municipal Stadium	83,009	Recap
11	November 26	Buffalo Bills	**W** 27–10	8–3	Cleveland Municipal Stadium	70,104	Recap
12	December 3	at **Pittsburgh Steelers**	**L** 0–30	8–4	Three Rivers Stadium	50,350	Recap
13	December 9	at **Cincinnati Bengals**	**W** 27–24	9–4	Riverfront Stadium	59,524	Recap
14	December 17	at New York Jets	**W** 26–10	10–4	Shea Stadium	62,614	Recap
Note: Intra-division opponents are in **bold** text.

== Postseason ==
Round	Date	Opponent	Result	Record	Venue	Attendance	Recap
Divisional	December 24	at Miami Dolphins	L 14–20	0–1	Miami Orange Bowl	78,196	Recap

== Standings ==
AFC Central
	W	L	T	PCT	DIV	CONF	PF	PA	STK
Pittsburgh Steelers	11	3	0	.786	4–2	9–2	343	175	W4
Cleveland Browns	10	4	0	.714	5–1	9–2	268	249	W2
Cincinnati Bengals	8	6	0	.571	3–3	6–5	299	229	W1
Houston Oilers	1	13	0	.071	0–6	1–10	164	380	L11
