= 1971 Cleveland Browns season =

NFL team season

- General manager: Harold Sauerbrei
- Head coach: Nick Skorich
- Home stadium: Cleveland Stadium

Results
- Record: 9–5
- Division place: 1st AFC Central
- Playoffs: Lost Divisional Playoffs (vs. Colts) 3–20
- Pro Bowlers: RB Leroy Kelly; TE Milt Morin

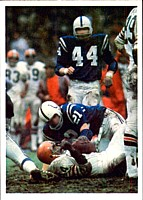
The Browns hosting the Colts in the 1971 AFC Divisional Playoffs Game.

The 1971 Cleveland Browns season was the team's 22nd season with the National Football League.

After missing the playoffs the previous year, the Browns got off to a good start at 4–1 only to stumble losing four straight to fall to 4–5. However, the Browns would rebound to win the final five games of the season for the AFC Central Division title. Just as the 1967 Browns returned to the playoffs following a one-year absence, so, too, did the '71 club, which was in its first season under new head coach Nick Skorich after Blanton Collier's final team in 1970 had finished just 7–7, ending a string of three consecutive postseason berths.

As was the case in 1967, the '71 Browns went 9–5 and won a division crown. They captured the AFC Central for the first time, finishing three games in front of the soon-to-emerge Pittsburgh Steelers (6–8). In the playoffs the Browns would fall in the first round 20–3 to the Baltimore Colts. Running back Leroy Kelly was on the downside of his Pro Football Hall of Fame career, but he did manage to rush for 865 yards and 10 touchdowns – still good for a 14-game season. Wide receiver Fair Hooker led the team in receptions with 45.

== Offseason ==
=== Draft ===
1971 Cleveland Browns draft
Round	Pick	Player	Position	College	Notes
1	14	Clarence Scott *	DB	Kansas State	
2	40	Bo Cornell	LB	Washington	
3	66	Paul Staroba	WR	Michigan	Played with Browns in 1972
3	68	Charlie Hall	LB	Houston	
4	92	Bubba Pena	G	UMass	Played with Browns in 1972
5	118	Stan Brown	WR	Purdue	
6	142	Doug Dieken *	T	Illinois	
6	144	Jay Dixon	DE	Boston University	
7	170	Bob Jacobs	K	Wyoming	
8	196	Larry Zelina	RB	Ohio State	
9	222	Wilmur Levels	DB	North Texas State	
10	248	Steve Casteel	LB	Oklahoma	
11	274	Mike Sikich	G	Northwestern	
12	300	Tony Blanchard	TE	North Carolina	
13	326	Thad Jamula	T	Lehigh	
14	352	Rick Kingrea	LB	Tulane	
15	378	Bill Green	DB	Western Kentucky	
16	404	Dave Smith	WR	Mississippi State	
17	430	Leo Dillon	C	Dayton	
Made roster * Made at least one Pro Bowl during career

== Staff ==
1971 Cleveland Browns staff
Front office: Owner - Art Modell; General Manager - Harold Sauerbrei; Equipment Manager - Morrie Kono; Assistant Equipment Manager - Bob Glenn; Head coaches: Head Coach – Nick Skorich; Offensive coaches: Offensive Coordinator - Nick Skorich; Offensive Line - Ray Prochaska; Offensive Backs - Howard Keys and then Jerry Williams; Wide Receivers - Bob Nussbaumer	Defensive coaches: Defensive Coordinator - Howard Brinker; Defensive Line - Dick Modzelewski; Linebackers/Film Coordinator - Ed Ulinski; Secondary - Richie McCabe; Strength and conditioning: Trainer - Leo Murphy; Team Physician - Vic Ippolito

== Roster ==
1971 Cleveland Browns roster
Quarterbacks (QB): 16 Bill Nelsen; 15 Mike Phipps; Running backs (RB): 30 Ken Brown; 33 Bo Cornell; 44 Leroy Kelly; 26 Reece Morrison; 35 Bo Scott; Wide receivers (WR): 21 Stan Brown; 86 Gary Collins; 43 Fair Hooker; 41 Dave Jones; 25 Frank Pitts; Tight ends (TE): 83 Chip Glass; 89 Milt Morin	Offensive linemen (OL): 64 Jim Copeland C/G; 65 John Demarie G; 73 Doug Dieken T; 54 Fred Hoaglin C; 66 Gene Hickerson G; 74 Mitch Johnson T; 78 Bob McKay T; 77 Dick Schafrath T; 63 Mike Sikich G; Defensive linemen (DL): 84 Bob Briggs DE/DT; 81 Jack Gregory DE; 71 Walter Johnson DT; 80 Joe Jones DE; 72 Jerry Sherk DT; 88 Ron Snidow DE	Linebackers (LB): 52 Billy Andrews OLB; 50 John Garlington OLB; 59 Charlie Hall OLB; 82 Jim Houston OLB; 58 Rick Kingrea MLB; 51 Dale Lindsey MLB; Defensive backs (DB): 28 Ben Davis CB; 34 Mike Howell FS; 24 Ernie Kellermann SS; 22 Clarence Scott CB; 20 Freddie Summers CB; 29 Walt Sumner SS; Special teams (ST): 12 Don Cockroft K/P	Practice squad: 11 Don Gault QB; 68 Bubba Pena G; 85 Paul Staroba WR; 67 Craig Wycinsky G; 75 Bill Yanchar DT; Reserve: 40 Erich Barnes S (IR); 36 Steve Engel RB (IR); 70 Joe Righetti DT (IR); Rookies in italics 42 active, 3 reserve, 5 practice squad

== Exhibition schedule ==
Week	Date	Opponent	Result	Record	Venue	Recap
1	August 8	at San Francisco 49ers	L 24–38	0–1	Candlestick Park	40,000
2	August 13	Los Angeles Rams	L 5–17	0–2	Cleveland Municipal Stadium	52,503
3	August 20	at Dallas Cowboys	L 15–16	0–3	Cotton Bowl	69,099
4	August 28	vs. Chicago Bears	L 19–20	0–4	Notre Dame Stadium	43,568
5	September 4	New York Giants	W 30–7	1–4	Cleveland Municipal Stadium	82,710
6	September 10	at St. Louis Cardinals	L 13–27	1–5	Busch Memorial Stadium	46,171

There was a doubleheader on September 4, 1971 Jets vs Steelers and Giants vs Browns.

== Schedule ==
Week	Date	Opponent	Result	Record	Venue	Attendance	Recap
1	September 19	**Houston Oilers**	**W** 31–0	1–0	Cleveland Municipal Stadium	73,387	Recap
2	September 26	at Baltimore Colts	**W** 14–13	2–0	Memorial Stadium	56,837	Recap
3	October 4	Oakland Raiders	**L** 20–34	2–1	Cleveland Municipal Stadium	84,285	Recap
4	October 10	**Pittsburgh Steelers**	**W** 27–17	3–1	Cleveland Municipal Stadium	83,391	Recap
5	October 17	at **Cincinnati Bengals**	**W** 27–24	4–1	Riverfront Stadium	60,284	Recap
6	October 24	Denver Broncos	**L** 0–27	4–2	Cleveland Municipal Stadium	75,674	Recap
7	October 31	Atlanta Falcons	**L** 14–31	4–3	Cleveland Municipal Stadium	76,825	Recap
8	November 7	at **Pittsburgh Steelers**	**L** 9–26	4–4	Three Rivers Stadium	50,202	Recap
9	November 14	at Kansas City Chiefs	**L** 7–13	4–5	Municipal Stadium	50,388	Recap
10	November 21	New England Patriots	**W** 27–7	5–5	Cleveland Municipal Stadium	65,238	Recap
11	November 28	at **Houston Oilers**	**W** 37–24	6–5	Houston Astrodome	37,921	Recap
12	December 5	**Cincinnati Bengals**	**W** 31–27	7–5	Cleveland Municipal Stadium	82,705	Recap
13	December 12	at New Orleans Saints	**W** 21–17	8–5	Tulane Stadium	72,794	Recap
14	December 19	at Washington Redskins	**W** 20–13	9–5	RFK Stadium	53,041	Recap
Note: Intra-division opponents are in **bold** text.

== Game summaries ==
=== Week 1: vs. Houston ===
The Browns open the regular season by blasting the Oilers, 31-0, in Nick Skorich's first game as coach. Leroy Kelly scores the Browns' first two touchdowns on 1-yard runs, and Bill Nelsen and Mike Phipps both throw a touchdown pass. The Browns intercept five passes (two by rookie Clarence Scott) and yield just 11 first downs.

=== Week 2: At Baltimore ===
The Browns survived a late mistake and upset the defending Super Bowl-champion Colts, 14-13 at Baltimore. After Walt Sumner intercepts a Johnny Unitas pass with five seconds left (Cleveland's fifth interception), he attempts to lateral to Scott, who never touches the ball as Baltimore's Ray Perkins recovers at the Cleveland 27. But the Colts, out of timeouts, watch the clock expire before they can get off a field-goal attempt.

=== Week 5: At Cincinnati ===
The Browns edge the Bengals, 27-24, at Cincinnati on Bo Scott's third touchdown - a 4-yard run with 39 seconds remaining. The win improves Cleveland's record to 4-1 and drops Paul Brown's defending AFC Central-champion Bengals to 1-4. The Browns get a break when defensive end Jack Gregory recovers a fumble at the Cincinnati 10, setting up a Nelsen-to-Scott TD pass. The players gave the game ball to Coach Howard Keys who was in the hospital with complications from cancer and died October 21, 1971.

=== Week 7: vs. Atlanta ===
Week 7: Atlanta Falcons at Cleveland Browns – Game summary

Quarter	1	2	3	4	Total
Falcons	14	7	7	3	31
Browns	0	0	7	7	14

at Cleveland Stadium, Cleveland, Ohio

- Date: October 31
- Game time: 1:00 p.m. EST
- Game weather: 63 °F (17 °C), relative humidity 72%, round (wind) 11 mph (18 km/h)
- Game attendance: 76,825
- TV announcers (CBS): Don Criqui (play–by–play), Irv Cross (color commentator) and Frank Clarke (sideline reporter)

Game information

First quarter

- ATL – Burrow 39 yard pass from Shiner (Bell kick)
  Falcons 7, Browns 0
- ATL – Hansen 40 yard interception return (Bell kick)
  Falcons 14, Browns 0

Second quarter

- ATL – Mitchell 23 yard pass from Shiner (Bell kick)
  Falcons 21, Browns 0

Third quarter

- ATL – Butler 1 yard rush (Bell kick)
  Falcons 28, Browns 0
- CLE – Scott 12 yard rush (Cockroft kick)
  Falcons 28, Browns 7

Fourth quarter

- ATL – Bell 27 yard field goal
  Falcons 31, Browns 7
- CLE – Collins 24 yard pass from Nelsen (Cockroft kick)
  Falcons 31, Browns 14

Top passers

- ATL – Dick Shiner 6/9, 115 yds, 2 TD
- CLE – Bill Nelsen 9/19, 108 yds, 1 TD, 4 INT

Top rushers

- ATL – Cannonball Butler 21 carr, 63 yds, 1 TD
- CLE – Bo Scott 11 carr, 46 yds, 1 TD

Top receivers

- ATL – Jim Mitchell 3 rec, 35 yds, 1 TD
- CLE – Fair Hooker & Milt Morin 3 rec, 30 yds

Turnovers

- ATL – 0
- CLE – 4

=== Week 10 vs. New England ===
The Browns snap a four-game losing streak with a 27-7 win over the Patriots at Cleveland Stadium. Kelly rushes for 113 yards and scores two touchdowns, one on a 7-yard pass from Nelsen for the game's first score. The Browns intercept four passes by New England rookie Jim Plunkett, who has trouble adjusting on a windy day.

=== Week 12 vs. Cincinnati ===
The Browns clinch their first AFC Central Division title with a 31-27 win over Cincinnati at Cleveland. Leroy Kelly, who surpassed the 100-yard mark for the 26th time, scores the first and last touchdowns to complement a 224-yard passing performance by Nelsen.

== Postseason ==
Round	Date	Opponent	Result	Record	Venue	Attendance	Recap
Divisional	December 26	Baltimore Colts	L 3–20	0–1	Cleveland Municipal Stadium	74,082	Recap

== Standings ==
AFC Central
	W	L	T	PCT	DIV	CONF	PF	PA	STK
Cleveland Browns	9	5	0	.643	5–1	7–4	285	273	W5
Pittsburgh Steelers	6	8	0	.429	4–2	5–6	246	292	L1
Houston Oilers	4	9	1	.308	2–4	4–7	251	330	W3
Cincinnati Bengals	4	10	0	.286	1–5	3–8	284	265	L3

Note: Tie games were not officially counted in the standings until 1972.
