= 1972–73 NFL playoffs =

American football tournament

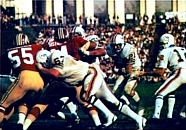
- The Dolphins playing against the Redskins in Super Bowl VII
- Dates: December 23, 1972–January 14, 1973
- Season: 1972
- Teams: 8
- Games played: 7
- Super Bowl VII site: L.A. Memorial Coliseum; Los Angeles, California
- Defending champions: Dallas Cowboys
- Champion: Miami Dolphins (1st title)
- Runner-up: Washington Redskins
- Conference runners-up: Dallas Cowboys; Pittsburgh Steelers
NFL playoffs
← 1971–72	1973–74 →

The National Football League playoffs for the 1972 season began on December 23, 1972. The postseason tournament concluded with the Miami Dolphins defeating the Washington Redskins in Super Bowl VII, 14–7, on January 14, 1973, at the Los Angeles Memorial Coliseum in Los Angeles, California, becoming the only NFL team to finish a championship season undefeated and untied.

Like the previous NFL seasons, the home teams in the playoffs were decided based on a yearly divisional rotation, excluding the wild card teams who would always play on the road and would not play against their own division champion in the playoffs unless they both made it to the Conference Championship; they would not be paired with each other in the first round.

== Participants ==
Within each conference, the three division winners and the non-division winner with the best overall regular season record of all remaining teams in the conference qualified for the playoffs. The NFL did not use a seeding system until the 1975 season, and instead home teams during the first two rounds of the playoffs alternated by division. Thus, it is possible that a team could host another club with a better regular season record. For the Super Bowl, the championship round was played at a neutral site, the designated home team was based on an annual rotation by conference.

Playoff participants
	AFC	NFC
East winner	Miami Dolphins	Washington Redskins
Central winner	Pittsburgh Steelers	Green Bay Packers
West winner	Oakland Raiders	San Francisco 49ers
Wild card	Cleveland Browns	Dallas Cowboys

== Bracket ==
Note: Prior to the 1975 season, the home teams in the playoffs were decided based on a yearly rotation. Had the playoffs been seeded, the divisional matchups in the AFC would not have changed, but undefeated Miami would have had home field advantage for the AFC championship game. The NFC divisional matchups would have been #4 wild card Dallas, ineligible to play Washington, at #2 Green Bay and #3 San Francisco at #1 Washington.

Dec 24 – Miami Orange Bowl
WC	Cleveland	14
Dec 31 – Three Rivers Stadium
East	Miami	20
AFC
East	Miami	21
Dec 23 – Three Rivers Stadium
Cent.	Pittsburgh	17
AFC Championship
West	Oakland	7
Jan 14 – Los Angeles Memorial Coliseum
Cent.	Pittsburgh	13
Divisional round
AFC	Miami	14
Dec 23 – Candlestick Park
NFC	Washington	7
Super Bowl VII
WC	Dallas	30
Dec 31 – Robert F. Kennedy Memorial Stadium
West	San Francisco	28
NFC
WC	Dallas	3
Dec 24 – Robert F. Kennedy Memorial Stadium
East	Washington	26
NFC Championship
Cent.	Green Bay	3
East	Washington	16

== Schedule ==
In the United States, CBS televised the NFC playoff games, while NBC broadcast the AFC games and Super Bowl VII.

Round	Away team	Score	Home team	Date	Kickoff (ET / UTC−5)	TV
Divisional round	Oakland Raiders	7–13	Pittsburgh Steelers	December 23, 1972	1:00 p.m.	NBC
Divisional round	Dallas Cowboys	30–28	San Francisco 49ers	December 23, 1972	4:00 p.m.	CBS
Divisional round	Green Bay Packers	3–16	Washington Redskins	December 24, 1972	12:00 p.m.	CBS
Divisional round	Cleveland Browns	14–20	Miami Dolphins	December 24, 1972	3:00 p.m.	NBC
Conference championships	Miami Dolphins	21–17	Pittsburgh Steelers	December 31, 1972	12:00 p.m.	NBC
Conference championships	Dallas Cowboys	3–26	Washington Redskins	December 31, 1972	3:00 p.m.	CBS
Super Bowl VII Los Angeles Memorial Coliseum Los Angeles, California	Miami Dolphins	14–7	Washington Redskins	January 14, 1973	3:30 p.m.	NBC

== Divisional round ==
=== Saturday, December 23, 1972 ===
==== AFC: Pittsburgh Steelers 13, Oakland Raiders 7 ====
Oakland Raiders vs. Pittsburgh Steelers – Game summary

Quarter	1	2	3	4	Total
Raiders	0	0	0	7	7
Steelers	0	0	3	10	13

at Three Rivers Stadium, Pittsburgh, Pennsylvania

- Game time: 1:00 p.m. EST
- Game attendance: 50,327
- Referee: Fred Swearingen
- TV announcers (NBC): Curt Gowdy and Al DeRogatis
- Boxscore

Game information

First quarter

- No scoring plays.

Second quarter

- No scoring plays.

Third quarter

- PIT – Roy Gerela 18-yard field goal. Steelers 3–0.

Fourth quarter

- PIT – Roy Gerela 29-yard field goal. Steelers 6–0.
- OAK – Ken Stabler 30-yard run (George Blanda kick). Raiders 7–6.
- PIT – Franco Harris 60-yard pass from Terry Bradshaw (Roy Gerela kick). Steelers 13–7.

Top passers

- OAK – Ken Stabler – 6/12, 57 yards
- PIT – Terry Bradshaw – 11/25, 175 yards, TD, INT

Top rushers

- OAK – Charlie Smith – 14 rushes, 57 yards
- PIT – Franco Harris – 18 rushes, 64 yards

Top receivers

- OAK – Raymond Chester – 3 receptions, 40 yards
- PIT – Franco Harris – 5 receptions, 96 yards, TD

Steelers fullback Franco Harris scored the winning touchdown on what became known as the Immaculate Reception. In a game that was mostly dominated by defense, the contest remained scoreless throughout the first half. On the opening drive of the second half, Pittsburgh drove 67 yards to take a 3–0 lead on Roy Gerela's 18-yard field goal. Following two Raiders drives that were shut down by Jack Ham's interception and a fumble recovery by Glen Edwards, Steelers safety Mike Wagner fell on a fumble by quarterback Ken Stabler (who had replaced injured starter Daryle Lamonica earlier in the game) at the Oakland 35. Five plays later, Gerela kicked a 29-yard field goal that gave Pittsburgh a 6–0 lead in the fourth quarter. Stabler responded by leading his team 80 yards to score on a 30-yard touchdown run with 1:13 left in the game.

Facing fourth and ten on their own 40-yard line with 22 seconds left, Steelers quarterback Terry Bradshaw threw the ball toward running back John "Frenchy" Fuqua. But the pass bounced off Raiders safety Jack Tatum and was caught by Harris, who then ran the rest of the way downfield to score a 60-yard touchdown that helped give the Steelers a 13–7 lead with five seconds left in the game. The play was controversial, as Tatum insisted the ball had bounced off Fuqua, not himself, which would have made the reception illegal under the rules of the time. Replays showing the play are inconclusive as to which player touched the ball (or if both of them did)

Harris was the sole offensive star of the game, rushing for 64 yards and catching 4 passes for 96 yards and a touchdown. The Raiders managed just 216 yards and started 8 of their 12 drives inside their own 22-yard line, mainly due to excellent punting from Pittsburgh's Bobby Walden, who averaged over 48 yards per punt on his 6 kicks and set AFC playoff records with punts of 62 and 59 yards.

This was the first postseason meeting between the Raiders and Steelers. Both teams would go on to build a heated rivalry, facing each other in the postseason five times in the 1970s alone.

==== NFC: Dallas Cowboys 30, San Francisco 49ers 28 ====
Dallas Cowboys vs. San Francisco 49ers – Game summary

Quarter	1	2	3	4	Total
Cowboys	3	10	0	17	30
49ers	7	14	7	0	28

at Candlestick Park, San Francisco

- Game time: 4:00 p.m. EST
- Game attendance: 59,746
- Referee: Pat Haggerty
- TV announcers (CBS): Ray Scott and Pat Summerall
- Boxscore

Game information

First quarter

- SF – Vic Washington 97-yard kickoff return (Bruce Gossett kick). 49ers 7–0.
- DAL – Toni Fritsch 37-yard field goal. 49ers 7–3.

Second quarter

- SF – Larry Schreiber 1-yard run (Bruce Gossett kick). 49ers 14–3.
- SF – Larry Schreiber 1-yard run (Bruce Gossett kick). 49ers 21–3.
- DAL – Toni Fritsch 45-yard field goal. 49ers 21–6.
- DAL – Lance Alworth 28-yard pass from Craig Morton (Toni Fritsch kick). 49ers 21–13.

Third quarter

- SF – Larry Schreiber 1-yard run (Bruce Gossett kick). 49ers 28–13.

Fourth quarter

- DAL – Toni Fritsch 27-yard field goal. 49ers 28–16.
- DAL – Billy Parks 20-yard pass from Roger Staubach (Toni Fritsch kick). 49ers 28–23.
- DAL – Ron Sellers 10-yard pass from Roger Staubach (Toni Fritsch kick). Cowboys 30–28.

Top passers

- DAL – Roger Staubach – 12/20, 174 yards, 2 TD
- SF – John Brodie – 12/22, 150 yards, 2 INT

Top rushers

- DAL – Calvin Hill – 18 rushes, 125 yards
- SF – Vic Washington – 10 rushes, 56 yards

Top receivers

- DAL – Billy Parks – 7 receptions, 136 yards, TD
- SF – Gene Washington – 3 receptions, 76 yards

Backup quarterback Roger Staubach replaced ineffective Craig Morton and led the Cowboys to score 17 unanswered points in the fourth quarter to overcome a 28–13 San Francisco lead and five turnovers. This was the third consecutive year Dallas eliminated San Francisco from the playoffs.

The 49ers jumped to a 7–0 early lead when Vic Washington returned the opening kickoff 97 yards for a touchdown. Dallas cut the deficit to 7–3 with kicker Toni Fritsch's 37-yard field goal. In the second quarter, 49ers receiver Gene Washington's 52-yard reception moved the ball deep into Dallas territory, only to have Cowboys cornerback Charlie Waters end the drive with an interception on the 1-yard line. But shortly after the turnover, Dallas quarterback Craig Morton lost a fumble while being hit by Windlan Hall and Tommy Hart, which linebacker Ed Beard recovered on the Cowboys 15-yard line. This led to Larry Schreiber's 1-yard touchdown run, making the score 14–3. Later in the quarter, Morton was intercepted by linebacker Skip Vanderbundt on the Dallas 32, setting up Schreiber's second rushing touchdown that increased the lead to 21–3. But Morton rallied his team back with 10 unanswered points, Fritsch's 45-yard field goal and Lance Alworth's 28-yard touchdown reception, cutting the deficit to 21–13.

In the second half, the Niners blew a chance to increase their lead when Bruce Gossett missed a 40-yard field goal attempt, but then got the ball back on Vanderbundt's second interception. Dallas managed to force a punt, which Jim McCann sent out of bounds at the Cowboys 5-yard line. A few plays later, defensive tackle Charlie Krueger stripped the ball from running back Calvin Hill on the 1 and the 49ers recovered, leading to Schreiber's third 1-yard touchdown run giving his team a commanding 28–13 lead.

Shortly before the end of the third quarter, coach Tom Landry replaced Morton with Roger Staubach, but it didn't seem to help. On his first drive, Staubach lost a fumble while being tackled by Bob Hoskins. San Francisco was in prime position to put the game away with another score, but they couldn't get the ball into the end zone and Gossett missed a 32-yard field goal attempt, causing a huge reversal of momentum. Now with the ball, Hill ripped off a 48-yard gain on a draw play to set up Fritsch's 27-yard field goal, trimming the lead to 28–16. Later in the quarter, a poor punt from McCann gave Dallas the ball at the 49ers 45-yard line. Staubach then led the team to the end zone, completing two passes to fullback Walt Garrison for 16 yards and two more to Billy Parks, the second a 20-yard touchdown completion to cut the score to 28–23 with less than two minutes left.

With time running out, Dallas had to attempt an onside kick. 49ers receiver Preston Riley briefly handled the ball, but couldn't hang on and it was recovered by Mel Renfro. On the first play after the recovery, Staubach gained 21 yards on a quarterback scramble. Then he connected for a 19-yard gain to Parks, who ran out of bounds at the San Francisco 10-yard line. On the next play, Staubach threw a 10-yard touchdown pass to receiver Ron Sellers, giving Dallas a 30–28 lead with just 52 seconds left. However, the 49ers were not quite out of the game. Needing only a field goal to win, Brodie completed three consecutive passes, but a 23-yard completion to Riley that would have put the 49ers in field goal range was eliminated by a holding penalty, and Brodie was intercepted by Waters on the next play.

This game would mark the end of the four-year battle for the starting quarterback position in Dallas between Morton and Staubach. With his outstanding performance of 12/20 completions for 172 yards and 2 touchdowns, with no interceptions and 23 rushing yards in just over one quarter of play, Staubach became the Cowboys' permanent starter and would not relinquish the position until the end of his career after the 1979 season, while Morton was traded to the New York Giants in 1974 and later became the starting quarterback of the Denver Broncos. Morton and Staubach would later meet again and face off against each other in Super Bowl XII. The 49ers would not return to postseason play until 1981.

Dallas' comeback from an 18-point deficit was the second largest comeback in NFL postseason history at the time. The Cowboys outgained the 49ers in total yards 402–255, and first downs 22–13, although they lost five turnovers and their quarterbacks were sacked five times. Brodie was not sacked at all. Hill finished the game with a career postseason high 125 rushing yards, and one reception for six yards. Parks caught 7 passes for 136 yards. Vic Washington had 200 all-purpose yards (3 KR for 136 yards, 56 rushing yards, 1 rec for 8 yards) Defensive end Cedrick Hardman had 3.5 sacks.

This was the third overall postseason meeting, and third such meeting in as many years between the Cowboys and 49ers. Both previous meetings had been in the NFC Championship Game, and were both won by Dallas.

Previous playoff games
Dallas leads 2–0 in all-time playoff games

1970

Dallas Cowboys 17 @ San Francisco 49ers 10

1970 NFC Championship Game

1971

San Francisco 49ers 3 @ Dallas Cowboys 14

1971 NFC Championship Game

=== Sunday, December 24, 1972 ===
==== NFC: Washington Redskins 16, Green Bay Packers 3 ====
Green Bay Packers vs. Washington Redskins – Game summary

Quarter	1	2	3	4	Total
Packers	0	3	0	0	3
Redskins	0	10	0	6	16

at RFK Stadium, Washington, D.C.

- Game time: 12:00 p.m. EST
- Game attendance: 52,321
- Referee: Bernie Ulman
- TV announcers (CBS): Jack Buck and Tom Brookshier
- Boxscore

Game information

First quarter

- No scoring plays.

Second quarter

- GB – Chester Marcol 17-yard field goal. Packers 3–0.
- WAS – Roy Jefferson 32-yard pass from Billy Kilmer (Curt Knight kick). Redskins 7–3.
- WAS – Curt Knight 42-yard field goal. Redskins 10–3.

Third quarter

- No scoring plays.

Fourth quarter

- WAS – Curt Knight 35-yard field goal. Redskins 13–3.
- WAS – Curt Knight 46-yard field goal. Redskins 16–3.

Top passers

- GB – Scott Hunter – 12/24, 150 yards, INT
- WAS – Billy Kilmer – 7/14, 100 yards, TD

Top rushers

- GB – MacArthur Lane – 14 rushes, 56 yards
- WAS – Larry Brown – 25 rushes, 101 yards

Top receivers

- GB – MacArthur Lane – 4 receptions, 42 yards
- WAS – Roy Jefferson – 5 receptions, 84 yards, TD

Using a five-man defensive line, the Redskins limited the Packers to only a field goal and held Green Bay running back John Brockington (who rushed for 1,027 yards during the season) to just 9 yards on 13 carries. Meanwhile, Washington kicker Curt Knight scored 3 field goals, while running back 1972 NFL MVP Larry Brown, who had missed the last two games of the season with a knee injury, returned to rush for 101 yards, his 7th 100-yard game of the year.

The Packers scored first after a 23-yard completion from Scott Hunter to John Staggers set up Chester Marcol's 17-yard field goal in the second quarter, which ended up being only time in the entire game the Packers would cross Washington's 40-yard line. But then Redskins running back Herbert Mul-Key returned their kickoff 42 yards to Washington 40-yard line. The Redskins went on to drive 60 yards and score on Billy Kilmer's 32-yard touchdown pass to Roy Jefferson. With 33 seconds left in the first half, Knight kicked a 42-yard field goal to give Washington a 10–3 halftime lead. The Redskins then dominated the second half, with Knight adding two more field goals, the second one a 46-yard kick at the end of a 43-yard drive in which Brown rushed 6 times for 32 yards.

This was the second postseason meeting between the Packers and Redskins. Green Bay won the only prior meeting when the Redskins were based in Boston.

Previous playoff games
Green Bay leads 1–0 in all-time playoff games

1936

Green Bay Packers 21 @ Boston Redskins 6

1936 NFL Championship Game

==== AFC: Miami Dolphins 20, Cleveland Browns 14 ====
Cleveland Browns vs. Miami Dolphins – Game summary

Quarter	1	2	3	4	Total
Browns	0	0	7	7	14
Dolphins	10	0	0	10	20

at Miami Orange Bowl, Miami, Florida

- Game time: 3:00 p.m. EST
- Game attendance: 78,916
- Referee: Norm Schachter
- TV announcers (NBC): Jim Simpson and Kyle Rote
- Boxscore

Game information

First quarter

- MIA – Charlie Babb 5-yard blocked punt return (Garo Yepremian kick). Dolphins 7–0.
- MIA – Garo Yepremian 40-yard field goal. Dolphins 10–0.

Second quarter

- No scoring plays

Third quarter

- CLE – Mike Phipps 5-yard run (Don Cockroft kick). Dolphins 10–7.

Fourth quarter

- MIA – Garo Yepremian 46-yard field goal. Dolphins 13–7.
- CLE – Fair Hooker 27-yard pass from Mike Phipps (Don Cockroft kick). Browns 14–13.
- MIA – Jim Kiick 8-yard run (Garo Yepremian kick). Dolphins 20–14.

Top passers

- CLE – Mike Phipps – 9/23, 131 yards, TD, 5 INT
- MIA – Earl Morrall – 6/13, 88 yards

Top rushers

- CLE – Bo Scott – 16 rushes, 94 yards
- MIA – Mercury Morris – 15 rushes, 72 yards

Top receivers

- CLE – Fair Hooker – 3 receptions, 53 yards, TD
- MIA – Paul Warfield – 2 receptions, 50 yards

Despite being 13-point favorites, Miami found themselves trailing 14-13 midway through the 4th quarter due to a Browns touchdown drive. The Dolphins proved up to the challenge, as they responded by driving 80 yards to retake the lead on an 8-yard rushing touchdown by Jim Kiick with less than 5 minutes left in regulation to keep the Dolphins' hopes alive for an undefeated season.

After punting on their opening drive, Miami got an early scoring opportunity when linebacker Doug Swift intercepted a pass from Browns quarterback Mike Phipps, giving the Dolphins a first down on the Browns 40-yard line. But Miami could only gain 1 yard over the next three plays and failed to score when Garo Yepremian missed a 46-yard field goal attempt. Their first score would come later, when Charlie Babb blocked a Cleveland punt, picked it up, and returned it for a touchdown. Following another Cleveland punt, Miami increased their lead to 10-0 by driving 51 yards, featuring a 21-yard run by receiver Paul Warfield on an end around play, and scoring on Yepremian's 40-yard field goal. Cleveland responded with a pair of runs for 32 total yards by Bo Scott and a 25-yard scramble by Phipps, giving the team a first down on the Dolphins 25-yard line. But once again they failed to score as the drive ended with an interception by Dolphins cornerback Curtis Johnson, who returned the ball 33 yards.

Ultimately, there would be no scoring in the second quarter, despite numerous chances for Miami. All the Dolphins got out of Johnson's interception return was a missed 53-yard field goal attempt by Yepremian. Later on, Browns punter Don Cockroft fumbled a high snap and was downed on the Cleveland 39 after he recovered the ball. But after a 15-yard holding penalty, a 9-yard loss on a sack by Browns lineman Walter Johnson, and a 12-yard loss on a run by Mercury Morris, the Dolphins found themselves pushed well out of scoring range. Dick Anderson later intercepted a pass from Phipps, but Yepremian's eventual field goal attempt was eliminated by a penalty on the last play of the first half.

Cleveland finally got on the board on their second drive of the third quarter, following a 38-yard punt return by Thom Darden that gave the team a first down on the Dolphins 44-yard line. Phipps completed a 21-yard pass to tight end Milt Morin on the first play, and eventually finished the drive with a 5-yard touchdown run, making the score 10–7. Kiick racked up 26 yards on 4 carries on Miami's ensuing drive, but on his 5th carry, he lost a fumble that was recovered by Browns linebacker Charlie Hall. Following a Browns punt, Kiick picked up 12 yards on two carries, while Morris rushed twice for 24 yards to set up Yepremian's 46-yard field goal, increasing Miami's lead to 13–7.

On the Browns ensuing drive, Phipps picked up 14 yards on a scramble and then completed an 18-yard pass to receiver Fair Hooker on a drive to the Dolphins 38. Anderson initially shut down the drive with an interception, but he fumbled the ball during the return, and Hooker recovered it for Cleveland on the Miami 30-yard line. Two plays later, Phipps completed a 27-yard touchdown pass to Hooker, giving the Browns their first lead of the game, 14–13, just under seven minutes into the fourth quarter.

With their undefeated season on the line, Miami responded by driving 80 yards in six plays for the game winning score. Quarterback Earl Morrall completed passes to Warfield for gains of 15 and 35 yards, while Morris added a 12-yard carry. A pass interference penalty on linebacker Bill Andrews gave the Dolphins a first down on Cleveland's 8-yard line, and Kiick scored the go-ahead touchdown run on the next play, giving Miami a 20–14 lead with 4:49 left in the game. Cleveland had two more chances to mount a comeback, but their first drive resulted in a punt, and on their final drive, Doug Swift recorded his second interception of the game, enabling Miami to run out the clock.

Miami intercepted 5 of Phipps' passes and amassed 198 rushing yards. Neither team's quarterback had much success. Phipps completed just 9 of 23 passes for 131 yards and one touchdown, while Morrall completed only 6/13 passes for 88 yards. Scott was the Browns top performer with 94 rushing yards and 4 receptions for 30. “The best thing for us was to get behind,” said Miami fullback Larry Csonka after the game. “It got very quiet and somebody said ‘If we’re gonna get anything done, now’s the time to do it’. It got done.”

This was the first postseason meeting between the Browns and Dolphins.

== Conference championships ==
=== Sunday, December 31, 1972 ===
==== AFC: Miami Dolphins 21, Pittsburgh Steelers 17 ====
Miami Dolphins vs. Pittsburgh Steelers – Game summary

Quarter	1	2	3	4	Total
Dolphins	0	7	7	7	21
Steelers	7	0	3	7	17

at Three Rivers Stadium, Pittsburgh, Pennsylvania

- Game time: 12:00 p.m. EST
- Game weather: 58 °F (14 °C), partly cloudy
- Game attendance: 50,845
- Referee: Ben Dreith
- TV announcers (NBC): Curt Gowdy and Al Derogatis
- Boxscore

Game information

First quarter

- PIT – Gerry Mullins fumble recovery in end zone (Roy Gerela kick). Steelers 7–0.

Second quarter

- MIA – Larry Csonka 9-yard pass from Earl Morrall (Garo Yepremian kick). Tied 7–7.

Third quarter

- PIT – Roy Gerela 14-yard field goal. Steelers 10–7.
- MIA – Jim Kiick 2-yard run (Garo Yepremian kick). Dolphins 14–10.

Fourth quarter

- MIA – Jim Kiick 3-yard run (Garo Yepremian kick). Dolphins 21–10.
- PIT – Al Young 12-yard pass from Terry Bradshaw (Roy Gerela kick). Dolphins 21–17.

Top passers

- MIA – Bob Griese – 3/5, 70 yards
- PIT – Terry Bradshaw – 5/10, 80 yards, TD, 2 INT

Top rushers

- MIA – Mercury Morris – 16 rushes, 76 yards
- PIT – Franco Harris – 16 rushes, 76 yards

Top receivers

- MIA – Paul Warfield – 2 receptions, 63 yards
- PIT – Al Young – 4 receptions, 54 yards, TD

The Dolphins continued their unbeaten streak as substitute quarterback Bob Griese, who had not started a game since week 5, led the team to two touchdowns in the second half.

Things started well for Pittsburgh as safety Glen Edwards intercepted a pass from Earl Morrall on the opening drive and returned it 28 yards to the Dolphins 48. Steelers running back Franco Harris subsequently gained 35 yards on 7 carries as the team drove to a third and 2 on the Miami 3-yard line. On the next play, Pittsburgh quarterback Terry Bradshaw fumbled the ball as he tried to run into the end zone, but right offensive guard Gerry Mullins recovered it for a touchdown, giving the Steelers an early 7–0 lead. Unfortunately for the Steelers, Bradshaw was injured on the play. He would last one more series, but it resulted in Pittsburgh punting. The Dolphins started from their 20-yard line and would tie the game after punter Larry Seiple's 37-yard run on a fake punt set up Morrall's 9-yard touchdown pass to fullback Larry Csonka. Bradshaw had to be relieved by Terry Hanratty and would not return until the fourth quarter. The score would remain tied 7–7 at the end of the first half.

On the opening drive of the third quarter, Hanratty completed passes to John McMakin and Ron Shanklin for gains of 22 and 24 yards, while John Fuqua added 24 yards on a draw play as the Steelers drove to a 14-yard field goal by Roy Gerela, putting them up 10–7. At this point, Bob Griese, who had been sidelined with a broken leg for 10 weeks, replaced Morrall and threw a 52-yard completion to Paul Warfield on his first pass attempt. Miami also caught a break on the drive when an offsides penalty against Pittsburgh wiped out an interception by linebacker Jack Ham. Eventually, Jim Kiick finished the 11-play, 80-yard drive with a 2-yard touchdown run, giving the Dolphins their first lead at 14–10. Near the end of the third quarter, Seiple's 33-yard punt gave Pittsburgh a first down on the Miami 48. Harris ran for 7 yards on the first play, but this was followed by two incompletions and Gerela's 48-yard field goal attempt was blocked.

Taking over on the Steelers' 49 after the blocked field goal, the Dolphins drove 49 yards on an 11-play drive that only had one pass play. Kiick finished it off with a 3-yard touchdown run, giving Miami a 21-10 fourth quarter lead. However, Bradshaw returned to the game for the Steelers' next drive and quickly led them to a score. He started the drive with a 9-yard pass to tight end Larry Brown, and followed it up with consecutive 25-yard completions to Al Young and Shanklin. On the fourth play of the possession, he threw a 12-yard touchdown pass to Young, cutting the score to 21–17. But on Pittsburgh's last two drives, he threw interceptions to Miami linebackers Nick Buoniconti and Mike Kolen, enabling the Dolphins to run out the rest of the clock.

This was the first postseason meeting between the Dolphins and Steelers.

==== NFC: Washington Redskins 26, Dallas Cowboys 3 ====
Dallas Cowboys vs. Washington Redskins – Game summary

Quarter	1	2	3	4	Total
Cowboys	0	3	0	0	3
Redskins	0	10	0	16	26

at RFK Stadium, Washington, D.C.

- Game time: 3:00 p.m. EST
- Game attendance: 53,129
- Referee: Jim Tunney
- TV announcers (CBS): Jack Buck and Pat Summerall
- Boxscore

Game information

First quarter

- No scoring plays.

Second quarter

- WAS – Curt Knight 18-yard field goal. Redskins 3–0.
- WAS – Charley Taylor 15-yard pass from Billy Kilmer (Curt Knight kick). Redskins 10–0.
- DAL – Toni Fritsch 35-yard field goal. Redskins 10–3.

Third quarter

- No scoring plays.

Fourth quarter

- WAS – Charley Taylor 45-yard pass from Billy Kilmer (Curt Knight kick). Redskins 17–3.
- WAS – Curt Knight 39-yard field goal. Redskins 20–3.
- WAS – Curt Knight 46-yard field goal. Redskins 23–3.
- WAS – Curt Knight 45-yard field goal. Redskins 26–3.

Top passers

- DAL – Roger Staubach – 9/20, 98 yards
- WAS – Billy Kilmer – 14/18, 194 yards, 2 TD

Top rushers

- DAL – Roger Staubach – 5 rushes, 59 yards
- WAS – Larry Brown – 30 rushes, 88 yards

Top receivers

- DAL – Ron Sellers – 2 receptions, 29 yards
- WAS – Charley Taylor – 7 receptions, 146 yards, 2 TD

Charley Taylor led the Redskins to the victory by recording 7 receptions for 146 yards and 2 touchdowns. Washington massively outgained Dallas in total yards (316–169), first downs (16–8), and third-down conversions (10/18–3/12), while holding them to a single field goal and shutting them out in the second half.

However, the game seemed close before the final period. Washington took the opening kickoff and drove to the Cowboys 31-yard line, but Larry Brown lost a fumble there and safety Cliff Harris recovered the ball. However, Dallas fared no better, and ended up running just six plays in the entire quarter. Following a punt, Washington scored on a 13-play, 9-minute drive, with Brown rushing for 31 yards and catching a pass for 9. Curt Knight finished the drive with an 18-yard field goal in the second quarter. Later on, Redskins quarterback Billy Kilmer smoked the Cowboys with a 51-yard completion to Taylor, and eventually scored on a 15-yard touchdown pass to Taylor that gave his team a 10–0 lead. Near the end of the half, Dallas quarterback Roger Staubach's 29-yard run set up a Toni Fritsch field goal from 35 yards, cutting the score to 10–3. Fritsch later got another attempt on the last play before halftime, but missed a 23-yard attempt, his first miss of the season from under 30 yards.

The third quarter was scoreless, with Dallas unable to move the ball past their own 30-yard line, but they still had a few chances to score. At one point, Kilmer fumbled the ball at his own 32-yard line, and it rolled all the way back to the 18, but Washington recovered it. Mike Bragg's ensuing punt went 36 yards to the Dallas 44, but Charlie Waters lost five yards while attempting a return and a clipping penalty cost them another 15, pushing the Cowboys all the way back to the 24. To make matters worse, Waters (who was a starter on defense) suffered a broken arm on the play and had to miss the rest of the game.

Taylor had already had an excellent game while being covered by Waters, and now that he was matched up against second stringer Mark Washington, Kilmer sensed a huge opportunity to break the game open. On their next drive, he completed four passes, the last a 45-yard touchdown bomb to Taylor on the second play of the fourth quarter, increasing Washington's lead to 17–3. The Redskins then dominated the rest of the game, scoring with field goals from Knight on each of their next three drives to make the final score 26–3.

Knight had a dismal season, making just 14 of 30 field goal attempts, but he had proven to be unusually effective in the playoffs, making all three of his kicks against Green Bay in the divisional round. On this day, he came through with another big performance, finishing a perfect 4/4 by making his final three field goals from 39, 46, and 45 yards. Kilmer also had one of the best performances of his career, completing 14 of 18 passes for 194 yards and two touchdowns with no interceptions, while also rushing for 15 yards. Brown was the top rusher of the game with 88 yards, and caught 2 passes for 16. Staubach completed just 9 of 20 passes for 98 yards, and was the Cowboys leading rusher with 5 carries for 59 yards.

This was the first postseason meeting between the Cowboys and Redskins.

== Super Bowl VII: Miami Dolphins 14, Washington Redskins 7 ==
Super Bowl VII – Miami Dolphins vs. Washington Redskins – Game summary

Quarter	1	2	3	4	Total
Dolphins (AFC)	7	7	0	0	14
Redskins (NFC)	0	0	0	7	7

at Los Angeles Memorial Coliseum, Los Angeles

- Date: January 14, 1973
- Game attendance: 90,182
- Referee: Tommy Bell
- TV announcers (NBC): Curt Gowdy and Al DeRogatis
- Boxscore

This was the first Super Bowl meeting between the Dolphins and Redskins.
