= List of UMass Minutemen in the NFL draft =

This is a list of UMass Minutemen football players in the NFL draft.

The University of Massachusetts (UMass) Minutemen football team has had 26 players selected in the National Football League (NFL) draft. Two of those selections were in the first round of the draft, 14th overall: tight end Milt Morin in 1966, and 11th overall: quarterback Greg Landry in 1968. A Massachusetts football alumnus had been selected in every NFL draft from 1970 to 1976.

Each NFL franchise seeks to add new players through the annual NFL draft. The draft rules were last updated in 2009. The team with the worst record the previous year picks first, the next-worst team second, and so on. Teams that did not make the playoffs are ordered by their regular-season record with any remaining ties broken by strength of schedule. Playoff participants are sequenced after non-playoff teams, based on their round of elimination (wild card, division, conference, and Super Bowl).

Before the merger agreements in 1966, the American Football League (AFL) operated in direct competition with the NFL and held a separate draft. This led to a bidding war over top prospects between the two leagues. As part of the merger agreement on June 8, 1966, the two leagues would hold a multiple round "common draft". Once the AFL officially merged with the NFL in 1970, the "common draft" simply became the NFL draft.

The first Massachusetts player to be taken in the NFL draft was Phil Vandersea in the sixteenth round of the 1965 NFL draft.

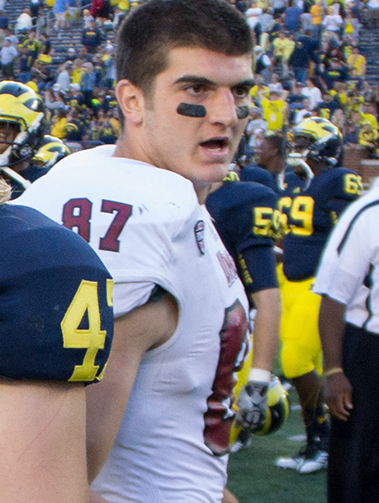
Tightend Rob Blanchflower was drafted in the 7th round in the 2014 NFL draft by the Pittsburgh Steelers.

== Key ==
B	Back	K	Kicker	NT	Nose tackle
C	Center	LB	Linebacker	FB	Fullback
DB	Defensive back	P	Punter	HB	Halfback
DE	Defensive end	QB	Quarterback	WR	Wide receiver
DT	Defensive tackle	RB	Running back	G	Guard
E	End	T	Offensive tackle	TE	Tight end

= Pro Bowler
= Hall of Famer

== Selections ==
Year	Round	Pick	Overall	Player	Team	Position
1965	16	10	220	Phil Vandersea	Green Bay Packers	RB
1966	1	14	14	Milt Morin	Cleveland Browns	TE
1966	7	11	106	Bob Meers	Minnesota Vikings	E
1966	15	14	229	Bob Ellis	Cleveland Browns	DE
1966	18	15	275	Ed Toner	Baltimore Colts	T
1968	1	11	11	Greg Landry	Detroit Lions	QB
1970	16	13	403	Steve Parnell	Atlanta Falcons	WR
1971	4	14	92	Robert Pena	Cleveland Browns	G
1971	15	1	365	Nick McGarry	New England Patriots	TE
1972	15	4	368	John Hulecki	Pittsburgh Steelers	G
1972	15	6	370	Harold Parmenter	Denver Broncos	DT
1973	13	17	329	Paul Metallo	Kansas City Chiefs	DB
1974	15	15	379	Peil Pennington	Denver Broncos	QB
1974	17	5	421	Tim Berra	Baltimore Colts	WR
1975	10	10	244	Bill Cooke	Green Bay Packers	DE
1976	8	28	237	Ed McAleney	Pittsburgh Steelers	DT
1979	7	27	192	Bruce Kimball	Pittsburgh Steelers	G
1980	10	3	252	Sandro Vitiello	Cincinnati Bengals	K
1999	5	11	144	Khari Samuel	Chicago Bears	LB
2010	2	29	61	Vladimir Ducasse	New York Jets	T
2013	7	47	253	Michael Cox	New York Giants	RB
2014	7	15	230	Rob Blanchflower	Pittsburgh Steelers	TE
2016	5	1	140	Tajae Sharpe	Tennessee Titans	WR
2019	2	30	62	Andy Isabella	Arizona Cardinals	WR
2020	6	32	211	Isaiah Rodgers	Indianapolis Colts	DB
2021	7	3	231	Larnel Coleman	Miami Dolphins	OT
