= Nick Skorich =

American football player and coach (1921–2004)

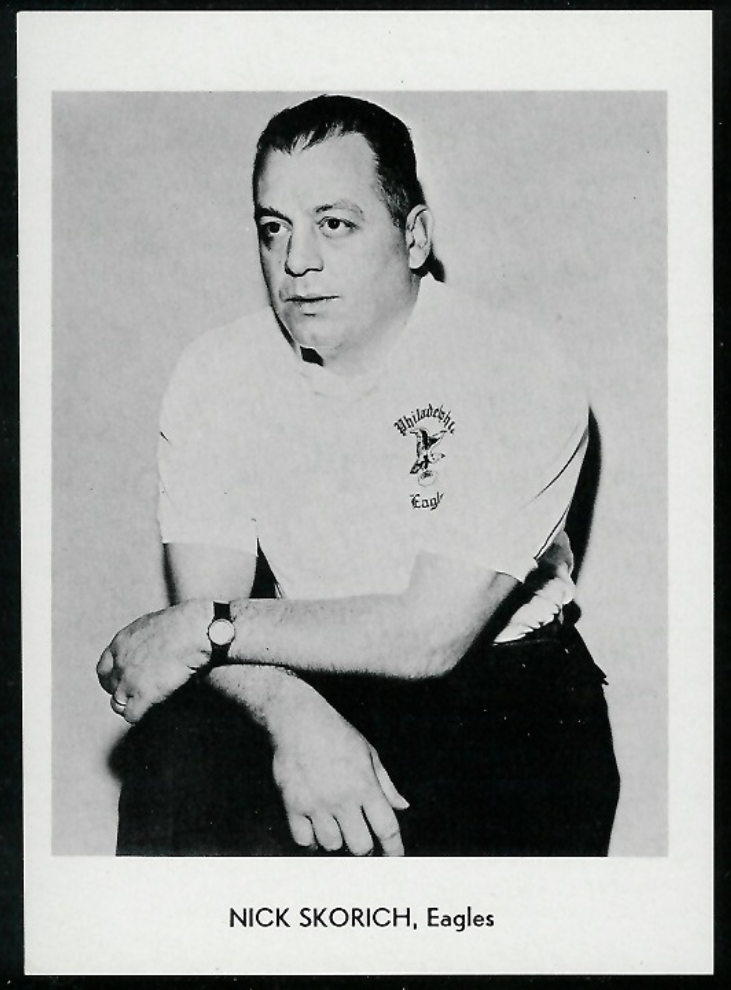
- Skorich in 1960

No. 12
- Position: Guard

Personal information
- Born: June 26, 1921; Bellaire, Ohio, U.S.
- Died: October 2, 2004 (aged 83); Philadelphia, Pennsylvania, U.S.
- Listed height: 5 ft 9 in (1.75 m)
- Listed weight: 197 lb (89 kg)

Career information
- High school: Bellaire
- College: Cincinnati
- NFL draft: 1943: 17th round, 157th overall pick

Career history

Playing
- Pittsburgh Steelers (1946–1948)

Coaching
- Central Catholic HS (PA) (1949–1952) Head coach; RPI (1953) Head coach; Pittsburgh Steelers (1954–1957) Assistant; Green Bay Packers (1958) Assistant; Philadelphia Eagles (1959–1960) Assistant; Philadelphia Eagles (1961–1963) Head coach; Cleveland Browns (1964) Defensive assistant; Cleveland Browns (1965–1967) Defensive line coach; Cleveland Browns (1968–1970) Offensive coordinator; Cleveland Browns (1971–1974) Head coach

Awards and highlights
- 2× NFL champion (1960, 1964)

Career NFL statistics
- Games played: 32
- Games started: 7
- Fumble recoveries: 2
- Stats at Pro Football Reference

Head coaching record
- Regular season: 45–48–5 (.485)
- Postseason: 0–2 (.000)
- Career: NFL: 45–50–5 (.475); College: 1–6–1 (.188)
- Coaching profile at Pro Football Reference

Nicholas Leonard Skorich (June 26, 1921 – October 2, 2004) was an American professional football player and coach.

== Early life ==
Skorich played guard at Bellaire High School and the University of Cincinnati before joining the United States Navy in 1943.

== Football career ==
After the end of World War II, he signed with the Pittsburgh Steelers, who had taken him in the 17th round of the 1943 NFL draft. He played three years for the Steelers.

Skorich then went into coaching, first at the high school level, then as an assistant with the Steelers from 1954 to 1957. After one year with the Green Bay Packers, he moved to the Philadelphia Eagles, who promoted him to head coach after Buck Shaw retired following the Eagles' 1960 championship season.

The Eagles remained competitive in 1961, winning 10 of 14 games, but fell to 3–10–1 in 1962 and 2–10–2 in 1963. Fired from the Eagles, Skorich took a job as a defensive assistant under Cleveland Browns coach Blanton Collier in 1964. The Browns promoted him to offensive coordinator four years later and head coach on January 7, 1971, upon Collier's retirement after the 1970 season.

In 1970, the Browns had gone 7–7 in only their second non-winning season since beginning play in 1946. Under Skorich, the Browns went 9–5 in 1971, winning the AFC Central Division before losing to the Baltimore Colts in the divisional playoffs. The following year, the Browns earned a wild card spot with a 10–4 record. In the playoffs, they came as close as anyone else that season did to beating the Miami Dolphins in that team's perfect season, losing 20–14 on a late Jim Kiick touchdown.

But by then Browns greats like Leroy Kelly, Gary Collins and Gene Hickerson had retired or were winding down their careers, and quarterback Mike Phipps was proving to be a disappointment. Cleveland dropped to 7–5–2 in 1973 and, in its first last-place finish ever, 4–10 in 1974. The Browns replaced Skorich with former Green Bay Packers star Forrest Gregg. Several players drafted under Skorich, including Brian Sipe, Doug Dieken and Greg Pruitt would play well for Gregg and his successor, Sam Rutigliano.

== Post career ==
After leaving Cleveland, Skorich served as supervisor of officials for the National Football League. He is credited with developing mechanics for umpires, the most demanding position on an officiating crew since the umpire is positioned behind the defensive line and is often caught in the middle of heavy traffic during play. The mechanics for umpires was changed by the NFL for the 2010 season, moving the umpire behind the quarterback, parallel to the referee, except for the last two minutes of each half.

He died in 2004, after complications from heart surgery. In his memory his family started the Nicholas L. Skorich scholarship fund, which, holds a yearly golf outing.

== Head coaching record ==
=== NFL ===
Team	Year	Regular season					Postseason			
Team	Year	Won	Lost	Ties	Win %	Finish	Won	Lost	Win %	Result
PHI	1961	10	4	0	.714	2nd in NFL East	—	—	—	—
PHI	1962	3	10	1	.250	7th in NFL East	—	—	—	—
PHI	1963	2	10	2	.214	7th in NFL East	—	—	—	—
PHI total		15	24	3	.393		—	—	—	—
CLE	1971	9	5	0	.643	1st in AFC Central	0	1	.000	Lost to Baltimore Colts in AFC Divisional Game
CLE	1972	10	4	0	.714	2nd in AFC Central	0	1	.000	Lost to Miami Dolphins in AFC Divisional Game
CLE	1973	7	5	2	.571	3rd in AFC Central	—	—	—	—
CLE	1974	4	10	0	.286	4th in AFC Central	—	—	—	—
CLE total		30	24	2	.554		0	2	.000	
Total		45	48	5	.485		0	2	.000	

=== NCAA ===
Year	Team	Overall	Conference	Standing	Bowl/playoffs
RPI Engineers (Eastern College Athletic Conference) (1953)
1953	RPI	1–6–1			
RPI:		1-6–1			
Total:		1–6–1			

== Bibliography ==
- Carroll, Bob, et al. (1999). Total Football II. New York: HarperCollins. ISBN 0-06-270174-6.
