= 1971–72 NFL playoffs =

American football tournament

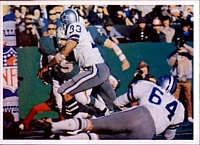
- Dallas Cowboys' running back Duane Thomas rushing the ball for a touchdown in Super Bowl VI
- Dates: December 25, 1971 – January 16, 1972
- Season: 1971
- Teams: 8
- Games played: 7
- Super Bowl VI site: Tulane Stadium; New Orleans, Louisiana
- Defending champions: Baltimore Colts
- Champion: Dallas Cowboys (1st title)
- Runner-up: Miami Dolphins
- Conference runners-up: Baltimore Colts; San Francisco 49ers
NFL playoffs
← 1970–71	1972–73 →

The National Football League playoffs for the 1971 season began on December 25, 1971. The postseason tournament concluded with the Dallas Cowboys defeating the Miami Dolphins in Super Bowl VI, 24–3, on January 16, 1972, at Tulane Stadium in New Orleans, Louisiana.

Like the previous NFL seasons, the home teams in the playoffs were decided based on a yearly divisional rotation, excluding the wild card teams which would always play on the road. It was the first time that the NFL scheduled games on Christmas Day, a decision that drew considerable criticism.

== Participants ==
Within each conference, the three division winners and the non-division winner with the best overall regular season record of all remaining teams in the conference qualified for the playoffs. The NFL did not use a seeding system until the 1975 season, and instead home teams during the first two rounds of the playoffs alternated by division. Thus, it is possible that a team could host another club with a better regular season record. For the Super Bowl, the championship round was played at a neutral site, the designated home team was based on an annual rotation by conference.

Playoff participants
	AFC	NFC
East winner	Miami Dolphins	Dallas Cowboys
Central winner	Cleveland Browns	Minnesota Vikings
West winner	Kansas City Chiefs	San Francisco 49ers
Wild card	Baltimore Colts	Washington Redskins

== Bracket ==
Note: Prior to the 1975 season, the home teams in the playoffs were decided based on a yearly rotation of division winners. Had the playoffs been seeded, the divisional round matchups would have been #3 Cleveland at #2 Miami and #4 wild card Baltimore at #1 Kansas City in the AFC; #4 wild card Washington at #1 Minnesota and #3 San Francisco at #2 Dallas in the NFC (since the Cowboys and Vikings both had 11-3 records and did not play during the regular season, the tiebreaker would have been conference record. Minnesota was 9-2 vs. NFC teams compared to Dallas' 8-3).

Dec 26 – Candlestick Park
WC	Washington	20
Jan 2 – Texas Stadium
West	San Francisco	24
NFC
West	San Francisco	3
Dec 25 – Metropolitan Stadium
East	Dallas	14
NFC Championship
East	Dallas	20
Jan 16 – Tulane Stadium
Cent.	Minnesota	12
Divisional round
NFC	Dallas	24
Dec 26 – Cleveland Stadium
AFC	Miami	3
Super Bowl VI
WC	Baltimore	20
Jan 2 – Miami Orange Bowl
Cent.	Cleveland	3
AFC
WC	Baltimore	0
Dec 25 – Municipal Stadium
East	Miami	21
AFC Championship
East	Miami	27**
West	Kansas City	24

** Indicates double overtime victory

== Schedule ==
In the United States, NBC broadcast the AFC playoff games, while CBS televised the NFC games and Super Bowl VI.

Round	Away team	Score	Home team	Date	Kickoff (ET / UTC−5)	TV
Divisional round	Dallas Cowboys	20–12	Minnesota Vikings	December 25, 1971	1:00 p.m.	CBS
Divisional round	Miami Dolphins	27–24 (2OT)	Kansas City Chiefs	December 25, 1971	4:00 p.m.	NBC
Divisional round	Baltimore Colts	20–3	Cleveland Browns	December 26, 1971	1:00 p.m.	NBC
Divisional round	Washington Redskins	20–24	San Francisco 49ers	December 26, 1971	4:00 p.m.	CBS
Conference championships	San Francisco 49ers	3–14	Dallas Cowboys	January 2, 1972	1:30 p.m.	CBS
Conference championships	Baltimore Colts	0–21	Miami Dolphins	January 2, 1972	4:30 p.m.	NBC
Super Bowl VI Tulane Stadium New Orleans, Louisiana	Dallas Cowboys	24–3	Miami Dolphins	January 16, 1972	1:00 p.m.	CBS

== Divisional round ==
=== Saturday, December 25, 1971 ===
==== NFC: Dallas Cowboys 20, Minnesota Vikings 12 ====
Dallas Cowboys vs. Minnesota Vikings – Game summary

Quarter	1	2	3	4	Total
Cowboys	3	3	14	0	20
Vikings	0	3	0	9	12

at Metropolitan Stadium, Bloomington, Minnesota

- Game time: 1:00 p.m. EST
- Game weather: 31 °F (−1 °C), mostly cloudy
- Game attendance: 47,307
- Referee: Norm Schachter
- TV announcers (CBS): Jack Whitaker and Irv Cross

Game information

First quarter

- DAL – Mike Clark 26-yard field goal. Cowboys 3–0.

Second quarter

- MIN – Fred Cox 27-yard field goal. Tied 3–3.
- DAL – Mike Clark 44-yard field goal. Cowboys 6–3.

Third quarter

- DAL – Duane Thomas 13-yard run (Mike Clark kick). Cowboys 13–3.
- DAL – Bob Hayes 9-yard pass from Roger Staubach (Mike Clark kick). Cowboys 20–3.

Fourth quarter

- MIN – Safety, Alan Page tackled Roger Staubach in end zone. Cowboys 20–5.
- MIN – Stu Voigt 6-yard pass from Gary Cuozzo (Fred Cox kick). Cowboys 20–12.

Top passers

- DAL – Roger Staubach – 10/14, 99 yards, TD
- MIN – Gary Cuozzo – 12/22, 124 yards, TD, 2 INT

Top rushers

- DAL – Duane Thomas – 21 rushes, 66 yards, TD
- MIN – Clint Jones – 15 rushes, 52 yards

Top receivers

- DAL – Lance Alworth – 2 receptions, 33 yards
- MIN – Bob Grim – 4 receptions, 74 yards

Although the Vikings outgained the Cowboys in total yards 311–183, Dallas forced 5 turnovers and converted some of them into 13 points en route to a 20–12 win.

Early in the first quarter, Larry Cole forced a fumble from Dave Osborn that was recovered by fellow lineman Jethro Pugh on the Vikings 36-yard line. Dallas then drove to the Minnesota 19, mainly on the strength of an 18-yard completion from Roger Staubach to Bob Hayes, before defensive tackle Alan Page's 3rd down sack forced them to settle for Mike Clark's 26-yard field goal that gave them a 3–0 lead. The Vikings responded with a 27-yard field goal by Fred Cox that tied the score.

In the second quarter, the Vikings got a big chance to take the lead when quarterback Bob Lee completed a 49-yard pass to Bob Grim on the Dallas 29-yard line. But linebacker Chuck Howley ended the drive with an interception, returning the ball 26 yards to the Vikings 37, and the Cowboys drove to a 44-yard Clark field goal that put them up 6–3. Minnesota had another chance to score as Clint Jones returned the kickoff 61 yards, but all this would result in was 3 incomplete passes and a missed 41-yard field goal attempt by Cox.

Early in the second half, Cliff Harris intercepted a pass from Lee and returned it 30 yards to the Vikings 13-yard line, setting up Duane Thomas' 13-yard touchdown run to give Dallas a 13–3 lead. Minnesota had a big chance to get back in the game when Charlie West returned the ensuing kickoff 51 yards, but this merely resulted in another missed field goal try by Cox, this one a 46-yard attempt. Late the third quarter, Dallas safety Charlie Waters returned a punt 24 yards to the Cowboys 48, sparking their only sustained drive of the second half. Moving the ball 52 yards, including a 30-yard completion from Staubach to Lance Alworth on 3rd and 15, Dallas went up 20–3 on Staubach's 9-yard touchdown pass to Hayes.

Still, Minnesota was not quite out of the game. Early in the 4th quarter, Paige sacked Staubach in the end zone for a safety. Then Vikings coach Bud Grant replaced Lee with Gary Cuozzo, who led the team to the Dallas 19 after the free kick. But Cowboys linebacker Lee Roy Jordan made a clutch interception that essentially put the game away. Cuozzo did manage to lead the team to a touchdown on a 6-yard pass to tight end Stu Voigt, making the score 20–12, but by then barely more than 2 minutes remained on the clock.

This was the first postseason meeting between the Cowboys and Vikings.

==== AFC: Miami Dolphins 27, Kansas City Chiefs 24 (2OT) ====
Miami Dolphins vs. Kansas City Chiefs – Game summary

Quarter	1	2	3	4	OT	2OT	Total
Dolphins	0	10	7	7	0	3	27
Chiefs	10	0	7	7	0	0	24

at Municipal Stadium, Kansas City, Missouri

- Game time: 4:00 p.m. EST
- Game weather: 47 °F (8 °C), partly cloudy
- Game attendance: 50,861
- Referee: John McDonough
- TV announcers (NBC): Curt Gowdy and Al DeRogatis
- Box Score

Game information

First quarter

- KC – Jan Stenerud 24-yard field goal. Chiefs 3–0.
- KC – Ed Podolak 7-yard pass from Len Dawson (Jan Stenerud kick). Chiefs 10–0.

Second quarter

- MIA – Larry Csonka 1-yard run (Garo Yepremian kick). Chiefs 10–7.
- MIA – Garo Yepremian 14-yard field goal. Tied 10–10.

Third quarter

- KC – Jim Otis 1-yard run (Jan Stenerud kick). Chiefs 17–10.
- MIA – Jim Kiick 1-yard run (Garo Yepremian kick). Tied 17–17.

Fourth quarter

- KC – Ed Podolak 3-yard run (Jan Stenerud kick). Chiefs 24–17.
- MIA – Marv Fleming 5-yard pass from Bob Griese (Garo Yepremian kick). Tied 24–24.

Overtime

- No scoring plays.

Second overtime

- MIA – Garo Yepremian 37-yard field goal. Dolphins 27–24.

Top passers

- MIA – Bob Griese – 20/35, 263 yards, TD, 2 INT
- KC – Len Dawson – 18/26, 246 yards, TD, 2 INT

Top rushers

- MIA – Larry Csonka – 24 rushes, 86 yards, TD
- KC – Wendell Hayes – 22 rushes, 100 yards

Top receivers

- MIA – Paul Warfield – 7 receptions, 140 yards
- KC – Ed Podolak – 8 receptions, 110 yards, TD

In the longest NFL game played to date at 82 minutes, 40 seconds (in game time) (and the Chiefs' last game at Municipal Stadium), Miami kicker Garo Yepremian kicked the winning 37-yard field goal after 7:40 of the second overtime period.

The Chiefs opened up the scoring with Jan Stenerud's 24-yard field goal. Willie Lanier intercepted a pass from Bob Griese and returned it 17 yards to set up Len Dawson's 7-yard touchdown pass to Ed Podolak, increasing the lead to 10–0. However, Griese rallied the Dolphins back on their next drive, completing a 23-yard pass to Paul Warfield and a 16-yarder to tight end Marv Fleming on the way to Larry Csonka's 1-yard touchdown run. Shortly before halftime, the Dolphins defense recovered a fumble from Podolak deep in Chiefs territory, enabling Garo Yepremian to kick a 14-yard field goal to tie the game, 10–10.

Kansas City retook the lead in the third quarter, on a 15-play, 75-yard drive that took 10 minutes off the clock and ended with Jim Otis' 1-yard score. Miami responded quickly though, storming right back to tie the game with a 1-yard touchdown run from Jim Kiick.

In the fourth quarter, Dolphins linebacker Nick Buoniconti recovered a fumble to give his team a big scoring opportunity. But Kansas City took the ball right back when linebacker Jim Lynch intercepted Griese's pass on the Chiefs 9-yard line. Kansas City then stormed 91 yards, including a 63-yard completion from Dawson to rookie receiver Elmo Wright, to retake the lead, 24–17, with Podolak's 3-yard touchdown run. Miami struck right back as Griese completed passes to Warfield for gains of 17 and 26 yards before finishing the 71-yard drive with a 5-yard touchdown pass to Fleming, tying the game at 24 with 1:25 left in regulation. Podolak returned the ensuing kickoff 78 yards to the Dolphins 22-yard line before being shoved out of bounds by Miami's Curtis Johnson, giving Stenerud a chance to win the game for the Chiefs in the final minute of regulation. But he missed the field goal attempt from 32 yards wide right, and Miami regained the ball for their final possession in regulation. The Dolphins were unable to move the ball, and Larry Seiple punted back to the Chiefs. Podolak signaled for a fair catch, but Dennis Homan caught the punt as time expired in regulation. Chiefs Coach Hank Stram mistakenly thought his team had an opportunity for a free kick from 68 yards, which, if good, would have resulted in a game-winning field goal (according to the rules, there is no option for a free kick if the player signaling for a fair catch does not catch the ball). Fearing a return by Miami speedster Mercury Morris if Stenerud's kick fell short, Kansas City declined, and the game went to overtime.

Kansas City took the opening kickoff of the first overtime period, and Podolak returned it to the 46-yard line. Kansas City then drove into scoring range, but Stenerud's 42-yard field goal attempt was blocked. Yepremian also attempted a 52-yard field goal later in the period, but it was short. As the first overtime period came to an end, Dolphins safety Jake Scott intercepted a pass from Dawson on the Chiefs 46. But the team was unable to move the ball and had to punt. Following a Kansas City punt, Csonka's 29-yard run set up Yepremian's game-winning score.

Podolak's 350 all-purpose yards (8 receptions for 110 yards, 17 carries for 85 yards, 3 kickoff returns for 154 yards, two punt returns for one yard) in this game remain an NFL playoff record, and is still the fourth highest total in NFL history. "I don't think any one player in a big game, a monumental game like that, had a day like Eddie Podolak had," said Stram after the game. Chiefs running back Wendell Hayes added 100 rushing yards, while Wright caught 3 passes for 104 yards. Dolphins receiver Paul Warfield finished with 7 receptions for a career postseason high 140 yards, while Csonka rushed 24 times for 86 yards and linebacker Nick Buoniconti racked up 20 tackles. Kansas City would not reach the playoffs again until 1986 nor reach the Divisional Round until 1991.

This was the first postseason meeting between the Dolphins and Chiefs.

=== Sunday, December 26, 1971 ===
==== AFC: Baltimore Colts 20, Cleveland Browns 3 ====
Baltimore Colts vs. Cleveland Browns – Game summary

Quarter	1	2	3	4	Total
Colts	0	14	3	3	20
Browns	0	0	3	0	3

at Cleveland Stadium, Cleveland, Ohio

- Game time: 1:00 p.m. EST
- Game attendance: 70,734
- Referee: Jack Reader
- TV announcers (NBC): Jim Simpson and Kyle Rote

Game information

First quarter

- No scoring plays.

Second quarter

- BAL – Don Nottingham 1-yard run (Jim O'Brien kick). Colts 7–0.
- BAL – Don Nottingham 7-yard run (Jim O'Brien kick). Colts 14–0.

Third quarter

- CLE – Don Cockroft 14-yard field goal. Colts 14–3.
- BAL – Jim O'Brien 42-yard field goal. Colts 17–3.

Fourth quarter

- BAL – Jim O'Brien 15-yard field goal. Colts 20–3.

Top passers

- BAL – Johnny Unitas – 13/21, 143 yards, INT
- CLE – Bill Nelsen – 9/21, 104 yards, 3 INT

Top rushers

- BAL – Don Nottingham – 23 rushes, 92 yards, 2 TD
- CLE – Leroy Kelly – 14 rushes, 49 yards

Top receivers

- BAL – Tom Mitchell – 5 receptions, 73 yards
- CLE – Bo Scott – 5 receptions, 41 yards

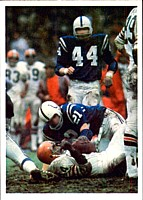
The Colt defense stopping a Browns run during the AFC Divisional Playoffs Game

Don Nottingham scored two touchdowns for the Colts, while their defense limited the Browns to only 165 yards, 11 first downs, and 3 points.

However, the Browns had plenty of scoring chances early in the game. On their first series, quarterback Bill Nelsen completed a 39-yard pass to Fair Hooker, but Rex Kern forced and recovered a fumble from him on the Colts 12-yard line. Baltimore had to punt on their ensuing drive, and Leroy Kelly's 48-yard return gave the Browns a first down on the Colts 4. All the Browns got from this field position though, was a 16-yard field goal attempt from Don Cockroft that was blocked by defensive tackle Bubba Smith (who would also block another field goal later on.)

After the blocked field goal, the Colts drove 93 yards in 17 plays, including a 7-yard run by Nottingham on 4th and inches, to score on Nottingham's 1-yard touchdown run. Later in the second quarter, Baltimore safety Rick Volk intercepted a pass from Nelsen and returned it 37 yards to the Browns 15-yard line, setting up Nottingham's second touchdown run on a 7-yard burst.

After three consecutive drives in the third quarter ended in turnovers, Cleveland finally got on the board with a 14-yard field goal by Cockroft. But Baltimore stormed right back on 74-yard drive to go up 17–3 on a field goal by Jim O'Brien. O'Brien added a 14-yard field goal in the fourth quarter to finish off the scoring.

Nottingham was the sole offensive star for either team with 92 rushing yards, 5 receiving yards, and two scores.

This would be the Colts' last postseason win representing Baltimore. The franchise moved to Indianapolis in 1984 and did not win a playoff game in their new home until 1995.

This was third postseason meeting between the Colts and Browns, all of which were in Cleveland. The teams split their previous two meetings.

Previous playoff games
Tied 1–1 in all-time playoff games

1964

Baltimore Colts 0 @ Cleveland Browns 27

1964 NFL Championship Game

1968

Baltimore Colts 34 @ Cleveland Browns 0

1968 NFL Championship Game

==== NFC: San Francisco 49ers 24, Washington Redskins 20 ====
Washington Redskins vs. San Francisco 49ers – Game summary

Quarter	1	2	3	4	Total
Redskins	7	3	3	7	20
49ers	0	3	14	7	24

at Candlestick Park, San Francisco

- Game time: 4:00 p.m. EST
- Game attendance: 45,327
- Referee: Pat Haggerty
- TV announcers (CBS): Ray Scott and Pat Summerall

Game information

First quarter

- WAS – Jerry Smith 5-yard pass from Billy Kilmer (Curt Knight kick). Redskins 7–0.

Second quarter

- SF – Bruce Gossett 23-yard field goal. Redskins 7–3.
- WAS – Curt Knight 40-yard field goal. Redskins 10–3.

Third quarter

- SF – Gene Washington 78-yard pass from John Brodie (Bruce Gossett kick). Tied 10–10.
- SF – Bob Windsor 2-yard pass from John Brodie (Bruce Gossett kick). 49ers 17–10.
- WAS – Curt Knight 35-yard field goal. 49ers 17–13.

Fourth quarter

- SF – Bob Hoskins fumble recovery in end zone (Bruce Gossett kick). 49ers 24–13.
- WAS – Larry Brown 16-yard pass from Billy Kilmer (Curt Knight kick). 49ers 24–20.

Top passers

- WAS – Billy Kilmer – 11/27, 106 yards, 2 TD, INT
- SF – John Brodie – 10/19, 176 yards, 2 TD

Top rushers

- WAS – Larry Brown – 27 rushes, 84 yards
- SF – Vic Washington – 16 rushes, 59 yards

Top receivers

- WAS – Larry Brown – 6 receptions, 62 yards, TD
- SF – Gene Washington – 1 reception, 78 yards, TD

The 49ers defense made key plays to lead San Francisco to a 24–20 victory over the Redskins after trailing 10–3 at the end of the half.

Washington scored first after Jon Jaqua blocked a punt from Steve Spurrier, enabling his team to take over on the 49ers 28. This set up quarterback Billy Kilmer's 5-yard touchdown pass to tight end Jerry Smith. San Francisco responded with a 23-yard field goal from Bruce Gossett, but Speedy Duncan returned the ensuing kickoff 37 yards to set up a field goal for the Redskins, a 40-yard kick by Curt Knight. With the score at 10–3 and time running out in the half, Ted Vactor returned a punt 48 yards to the 49ers 11-yard line. But with 32 seconds left, receiver Roy Jefferson was dropped for a 13-yard loss by defensive end Cedrick Hardman on an end around play, and Knight's ensuing field goal attempt was blocked by linebacker Frank Nunley

Duncan returned the second half kickoff 66 yards to the San Francisco 34, but the 49ers made a key defensive stand, stopping Washington on the 12 when Nunley tackled Larry Brown for a 2-yard loss on 4th and inches. Three plays later, facing 3rd down and 1, quarterback John Brodie threw a deep pass that went just over the outstretched arms of defensive back Pat Fischer and into the arms of receiver Gene Washington, who caught the ball in stride at the 40 and took off for a 78-yard touchdown reception. Then on the next series, Roosevelt Taylor's interception set up Bob Windsor's 2-yard touchdown reception to give San Francisco a 17–10 lead.

Duncan returned the next kickoff 67 yards to set up a 35-yard Knight field goal, making the score 17–13. But with 3:20 left in the game, San Francisco put the game away when defensive tackle Bob Hoskins recovered a bad snap on a Washington punt attempt in the end zone for a touchdown. After this, the Redskins managed to cut the final score to 24–20 on Kilmer's 16-yard pass to Brown in the game's closing seconds.

Brown rushed for 84 yards, while also catching 6 passes for 62 yards and a touchdown. Kilmer completed 11 of 26 passes for 106 yards and 2 touchdowns, with 1 interception. Duncan set a franchise playoff record with 170 yards on 3 kickoff returns. Brodie finished with 10/19 completions for 176 yards and two touchdowns.

This was the first postseason meeting between the Redskins and 49ers.

== Conference championships ==
=== Sunday, January 2, 1972 ===
==== NFC: Dallas Cowboys 14, San Francisco 49ers 3 ====
San Francisco 49ers vs. Dallas Cowboys – Game summary

Quarter	1	2	3	4	Total
49ers	0	0	3	0	3
Cowboys	0	7	0	7	14

at Texas Stadium, Irving, Texas

- Game time: 1:30 p.m. EST
- Game attendance: 63,409
- Referee: Tommy Bell
- TV announcers (CBS): Jack Buck and Pat Summerall
- Box score

Game information

First quarter

- No scoring plays.

Second quarter

- DAL – Calvin Hill 1-yard run (Mike Clark kick). Cowboys 7–0.

Third quarter

- SF – Bruce Gossett 28-yard field goal. Cowboys 7–3.

Fourth quarter

- DAL – Duane Thomas 2-yard run (Mike Clark kick). Cowboys 14–3.

Top passers

- SF – John Brodie – 14/30, 184 yards, 3 INT
- DAL – Roger Staubach – 9/18, 103 yards

Top rushers

- SF – Vic Washington – 10 rushes, 58 yards
- DAL – Roger Staubach – 8 rushes, 55 yards

Top receivers

- SF – Gene Washington – 4 receptions, 88 yards
- DAL – Billy Truax – 2 receptions, 43 yards

This was a rematch of the first NFC Championship Game played the previous season in San Francisco. Prior to 1975, the NFL rotated hosting rights of playoff games between divisions, and the NFC East champion Cowboys had the right to host the 1971 title game. It was the fourth title game played by the Cowboys, (Note: In addition to the 1970 NFC Championship Game, the Cowboys had previously appeared in the first two NFL title games of the Super Bowl era, losing both times to the Green Bay Packers.) and the 49ers' second title game appearance as an NFL team after the preceding season's game. (Note: The San Francisco 49ers appeared in (and lost) the final championship game of the All-America Football Conference, which San Francisco played in from 1946–49 prior to joining the NFL. The NFL does not recognize AAFC records as part of its own.)

Dallas won the NFC East with an 11–3 record and defeated the NFC Central champion Minnesota Vikings 20–12 at Metropolitan Stadium in the Divisional Round to advance to the NFC Championship game. San Francisco won the NFC West with a 9–5 record and defeated the NFC East runner-up Washington Redskins 24–20 at Candlestick Park in the Divisional Round to reach the NFC title game. This was also the Cowboys' first season at the brand new Texas Stadium in the Dallas suburb of Irving. Since the Cowboys were on the road for the Divisional Round, the title game against San Francisco was the first NFL playoff game at Texas Stadium. Both teams played on artificial turf in their home stadiums. The 49ers moved to an expanded Candlestick Park in 1971, which had artificial turf from 1970 through 1978.

As was the case in 1970, the teams did not meet in the regular season, thus their most recent game was Dallas' win in the 1970 NFC title game, the final NFL game at Kezar Stadium. Their most recent regular season game, in 1969 on Thanksgiving at the Cotton Bowl, ended in a 24–24 tie.

In the first playoff game at Texas Stadium, the Cowboys' defense dominated the 49ers' offense, allowing only 61 rushing yards, nine first downs, and forcing three interceptions.

Scoreless into the second quarter, veteran Dallas defensive end George Andrie intercepted a screen pass from John Brodie and returned it seven yards to the 49ers' two to set up Calvin Hill's one-yard touchdown run. This was the only score of the game until the middle of the third quarter, when Brodie's 24-yard completion to tight end Ted Kwalick set up Bruce Gossett's 28-yard field goal.

Following a missed 47-yard field goal by Gossett on San Francisco's next drive, Dallas QB Roger Staubach finished the quarter with a 17-yard completion to halfback Dan Reeves. Then he started off the fourth with a 23-yard pass to tight end Billy Truax. Duane Thomas completed the 14-play, 80-yard drive with a two-yard touchdown run for a 14–3 lead, and the final score.

With nine minutes left in regulation, the Dallas defense took over the rest of the game, forcing turnovers on San Francisco's last three drives. First, linebacker Chuck Howley broke up a 4th down pass. Then on San Francisco's next possession, Brodie was intercepted by linebacker Lee Roy Jordan. Finally, after Mike Clark's 24-yard field goal attempt was blocked by 49ers linebacker Frank Nunley, safety Cliff Harris picked off a pass from Brodie that enabled Dallas to run out the clock.

After the game, Dallas received a visit in the locker room from former President Lyndon Johnson, who told Staubach, "You're the best. They should rename this place Staubach stadium."

This was the second postseason meeting between the 49ers and Cowboys, with Dallas winning both.

The NFC champion Cowboys made their second consecutive Super Bowl appearance. Dallas defeated the Miami Dolphins of the American Football Conference 24–3 in Super Bowl VI at New Orleans to win their first Super Bowl.

The Cowboys made two more consecutive appearances in the NFC title game, but lost both, to the Washington Redskins and Minnesota Vikings. After a one-year absence from the title game (and playoffs), the Cowboys captured their third NFC championship in 1975.

The 49ers lost again to the Cowboys the following year in the playoffs, this time in the Divisional Round. San Francisco did not return to the postseason until 1981, when they finally beat Dallas in the NFC title game en route to their first Super Bowl appearance and victory.

Previous playoff games
Dallas leads 1–0 in all-time playoff games

1970

Dallas Cowboys 17 @ San Francisco 49ers 10

1970 NFC Championship Game

==== AFC: Miami Dolphins 21, Baltimore Colts 0 ====
Baltimore Colts vs. Miami Dolphins – Game summary

Quarter	1	2	3	4	Total
Colts	0	0	0	0	0
Dolphins	7	0	7	7	21

at Miami Orange Bowl, Miami, Florida

- Game time: 4:30 p.m. EST
- Game attendance: 76,622
- Referee: Jack Vest
- TV announcers (NBC): Curt Gowdy and Al DeRogatis

Game information

First quarter

- MIA – Paul Warfield 75-yard pass from Bob Griese (Garo Yepremian kick). Dolphins 7–0.

Second quarter

- No scoring plays.

Third quarter

- MIA – Dick Anderson 62-yard interception return (Garo Yepremian kick). Dolphins 14–0.

Fourth quarter

- MIA – Larry Csonka 5-yard run (Garo Yepremian kick). Dolphins 21–0.

Top passers

- BAL – Johnny Unitas – 20/36, 224 yards, 3 INT
- MIA – Bob Griese – 4/8, 158 yards, TD, INT

Top rushers

- BAL – Don McCauley – 15 rushes, 50 yards
- MIA – Jim Kiick – 18 rushes, 66 yards

Top receivers

- BAL – Eddie Hinton – 6 receptions, 98 yards
- MIA – Paul Warfield – 2 receptions, 125 yards, TD

The Dolphins reached the AFC title game in their sixth season, thus becoming the first of the then-four NFL teams which had commenced play after the start of the Super Bowl era to play in a title game. This made them the youngest franchise to make it to a Super Bowl era title game up to that point. (Note: The Super Bowl era began with the 1966 season, the AFL's seventh, which was the same year Miami joined the AFL. The Dolphins were the first AFL expansion team to join after the eight charter AFL franchises. The first NFL Championship Game of the Super Bowl era included the Dallas Cowboys, who also commenced play the same year as the AFL teams.) Miami won the AFC East with a 10–3–1 regular season record and defeated the AFC Central champion Kansas City Chiefs in the longest NFL game in history, (27–24 in double overtime) at Kansas City's Municipal Stadium in the Divisional Round to advance to the AFC Championship game.

This was the second consecutive AFC Championship Game contested by the Colts, their third title game in the past four seasons, (Note: The Colts had previously appeared in and won the 1968 NFL Championship Game prior to completion of the AFL-NFL merger.) and their sixth title game appearance overall. (Note: Prior to the Super Bowl era, the Colts appeared in three NFL Championship Games, of which they won two.) While the defending AFC and Super Bowl champions failed to repeat as AFC East champions, their 10–4 regular season record was good enough for the then-one AFC wild card berth. Baltimore defeated the AFC Central champion Cleveland Browns 20–3 at Cleveland Stadium in the Divisional Round to reach the AFC title game.

In addition to being the first playoff meeting between these teams, the AFC title game was the Dolphins' first playoff game at home. Their only previous playoff game had been in the 1970–71 NFL playoffs when they were the AFC wild card. Just as significantly, it pitted Dolphins coach Don Shula against his former team, which he had left for Miami in acrimonious circumstances prior to the 1970 season.

This was the first post-merger conference championship game contested between division rivals, and also the first in either conference to not feature a West Division team. Miami and Baltimore split their two regular season games in the 1971 season, with the Dolphins winning 17–14 at the Orange Bowl while the Colts won 14–3 at Memorial Stadium.

Although Miami quarterback Bob Griese completed only 4 passes, the Dolphins defense shut out the Colts. Defensive back Dick Anderson intercepted Johnny Unitas three times, returning one of them 62 yards for a touchdown.

Paul Warfield recorded a 75-yard touchdown reception midway through the first quarter on the Dolphins second drive. Meanwhile, the Colts managed to move the ball close enough for Jim O'Brien to twice attempt field goals, but he missed both times. In the second quarter, the Colts drove from their own 18 to the Dolphins 9-yard line, featuring a 28-yard reception by Don Nottingham, but on 4th down and 1, Nottingham was stuffed by a gang of Dolphins defenders just inches short of the first down marker.

In the third quarter, Unitas threw a pass that was deflected by cornerback Curtis Johnson into the hands of Anderson, who took off for a 62-yard scoring return. Then in the fourth quarter, Griese's 50-yard pass to Warfield set up Larry Csonka's 5-yard touchdown run.

This was the first postseason meeting between the Colts and Dolphins.

The AFC champion Dolphins made their first Super Bowl appearance. Miami lost 24–3 to the Dallas Cowboys of the National Football Conference in Super Bowl VI.

This was the first of three consecutive AFC titles for the Dolphins, who would go on to win two consecutive Super Bowls with their first such championship being the only perfect NFL season in the modern era.

The Colts went into a steep decline after this game, going 11-31 over the next three seasons, bottoming out at 2-12 in 1974. Coincidentally, Unitas' last appearance for Baltimore came 11 months later on the Orange Bowl poly-turf in the regular season finale.

This was the last AFC Championship Game appearance by the Colts while they were based in Baltimore. The Colts relocated to Indianapolis in 1984, but did not return to the AFC Championship Game until the 1995 season which incidentally was the last season of the NFL's absence from Baltimore. A Baltimore-based team would finally return to the AFC Championship Game in 2000, which Baltimore's current team (the Ravens) won en route to their first Super Bowl championship.

Six NFL teams have been enfranchised since 1971, four of which reached a title game (two in each conference) in less than the six seasons it took Miami to do so. (Note: The six teams that have joined the NFL since 1971 are the Tampa Bay Buccaneers, who commenced play in 1976 and reached the NFC title game in their fourth season, the Seattle Seahawks who also commenced play in 1976 and reached the AFC title game in their eighth season, the Carolina Panthers and Jacksonville Jaguars, who commenced play in 1995 and reached the NFC and AFC title games respectively in their second seasons, the Baltimore Ravens who joined the NFL in 1996 (although they acquired the roster of the Cleveland Browns) and won the AFC title and Super Bowl in their fifth season, and the Houston Texans who commenced play in 2002 and have yet to play in a title game. Also notable is that the Browns were restocked by an expansion draft upon their 1999 re-activation, and have also not appeared in a title game since.) Of those four clubs, the only team to win their first title game was the aforementioned Ravens in their fifth season. The Ravens, upon their enfranchisement, acquired the roster of the Cleveland Browns, who suspended operations for three seasons. The Ravens were not a 1996 expansion team from a football operations perspective.

== Super Bowl VI: Dallas Cowboys 24, Miami Dolphins 3 ==
Super Bowl VI – Dallas Cowboys vs. Miami Dolphins – Game summary

Quarter	1	2	3	4	Total
Cowboys (NFC)	3	7	7	7	24
Dolphins (AFC)	0	3	0	0	3

at Tulane Stadium, New Orleans, Louisiana

- Date: January 16, 1972
- Game attendance: 81,023
- Referee: Jim Tunney
- TV announcers (CBS): Ray Scott and Pat Summerall

This is the only Super Bowl meeting between the Cowboys and Dolphins.
