= Milt Morin =

American football player (1942–2010)

No. 89
- Position: Tight end

Personal information
- Born: October 15, 1942; Leominster, Massachusetts, U.S.
- Died: July 9, 2010 (aged 67); Northampton, Massachusetts, U.S.
- Listed height: 6 ft 4 in (1.93 m)
- Listed weight: 238 lb (108 kg)

Career information
- High school: St. Bernard's Central Catholic (Fitchburg, Massachusetts)
- College: UMass (1963–1965)
- NFL draft: 1966: 1st round, 14th overall pick
- AFL draft: 1966: 3rd round, 24th overall pick

Career history
- Cleveland Browns (1966–1975)

Awards and highlights
- 2× Pro Bowl (1968, 1971); Cleveland Browns Legends; First-team Little All-American (1964); 2× First-team All-East (1964, 1965)

Career NFL statistics
- Receptions: 271
- Receiving yards: 4,208
- Receiving touchdowns: 16
- Stats at Pro Football Reference
- College Football Hall of Fame

Milton Denis Morin (October 15, 1942 – July 9, 2010) was an American professional football player who was a tight end in the National Football League (NFL) for the Cleveland Browns. At the time he retired, he held the Browns' records for receptions and receiving yards by a tight end. He was selected to play in the Pro Bowl twice. Morin played college football at the University of Massachusetts, where he set numerous pass receiving records. In July 2010, Morin was inducted into the College Football Hall of Fame, shortly after his death.

== Early life ==
Morin was born on October 15, 1942, in Leominster, Massachusetts, to Levite and Anna (Lemoine) Morin. He was one of eight children. He attended St. Bernard's Central Catholic High School in Fitchburg, Massachusetts, graduating in 1961. Morin played four sports at St. Bernard's, but did not consider himself outstanding in any of them. He played fullback and punter on the school's football team. He was on the school's basketball team, and was considered a top level high jumper in track and field. Morin held records in track and field and was elected co-captain of the football team.

After high school, Morin attended Brewster Academy in Wolfeboro, New Hampshire, before attending college. His experience at Brewster helped Morin mature and become a better student. He had been an offensive lineman, but was moved to tight end on Brewster's football team, where he also starred at linebacker.

== College career ==
Morin received and accepted a football scholarship to attend the University of Massachusetts (UMass), graduating in 1966. He had also been offered scholarships by Syracuse University, Boston University, and Holy Cross. Morin never expected that he would become a professional football player after college, and intended to become a teacher after obtaining his degree from UMass. He married Ellen (Lyons) Morin during his senior year at UMass. Like Morin, she thought she was marrying someone who would soon become a physical education teacher after graduating, not a professional football player.

Morin played three years of varsity football (1963 to 1965) under UMass coach Vic Fusia, in the Yankee Conference. He was a two-way player on offense and defense as a sophomore and junior, but played solely on offense as a senior. He was also the team's placekicker as a senior. He was a 6 ft 3 in (1.91 m) 220 lb (99.8 kg) end on the freshman football team in 1962, under freshman head coach Don Johnson. He joined the varsity football team as a sophomore (1963). He had 16 receptions for 310 yards and four touchdowns at tight end; with two touchdown receptions in one game during his sophomore season. The team had an 8–0–1 record that season.

As a junior (1964), Morin was a 6 ft 4.5 in (1.94 m) 240 lb (108.9 kg) tight end. He had 13 receptions for 284 yards and three touchdowns. The team was 8–2, and played East Carolina in the 1964 Tangerine Bowl, losing 14–13. This was UMass's first post-season bowl game. Morin caught two passes in that game and had a fumble recovery on defense; but UMass suffered an interception when a pass deflected off of Morin's hands.

As a senior (1965), the team finished 7–2. His 1965 teammates included sophomore quarterback Greg Landry; who went on to a long NFL career. Morin had 29 receptions for 557 receiving yards in 1965, with four touchdowns. He also kicked 23 extra points and two field goals, and had an interception on defense. Morin had nine receptions for 181 yards against the University of Vermont in a late October 1965 game, with one touchdown. He also kicked two extra points and a field goal in that game. The nine receptions in a single game tied a school record.

Morin was All-Yankee Conference from 1963 to 1965. He was a first-team College Division All-American in 1964, and second-team College Division All-American in 1965. He was also selected first-team All-East by the Associated Press (AP) in 1964 and 1965; and first-team All-New England in three consecutive seasons. Moran was chosen to play in the January 1966 Senior Bowl. He was also selected to play in the 1966 Chicago Charities College All-Star Game.

Overall, UMass was 23–4–1 during Morin's three years, winning two Yankee Conference championships. During his three-year career, Morin set the UMass record for career receiving yards with 1,151. He also set UMass records for most receiving yards in a game (181) and a season (557).

In addition to being on the football team, in 1965 Morin was the New England heavyweight (unlimited weight) wrestling champion. He also played lacrosse for UMass. In May 1966, UMass honored Morin with the Joseph Lojko Award as the school's outstanding three sport athlete. Morin was a member of Kappa Sigma fraternity, and was named a Kappa Sigma second-team football All-American in January 1965.

== Professional career ==
The Cleveland Browns selected Morin in the first round of the 1966 NFL draft, 14th overall. Morin was the first-ever UMass first-round draft pick. The San Diego Chargers selected Morin in the third round of the 1966 AFL draft, 24th overall. In mid-December 1965, Morin signed a contract with the Browns in the New York office of NFL commissioner Pete Rozelle. Morin was represented by Martin Blackman and Steve Arnold of Pro Sports, Inc. in dealing with the Browns and the Chargers. Blackman reportedly was a non-practicing attorney and Pro Sports was a company that focused on obtaining endorsements for athletes, with this being its first contract negotiation on behalf of a client. With fringe benefits, the contract had an estimated overall worth of $100,000; however, Browns' owner Art Modell said at the time of signing it was team policy not to pay any rookie a base salary higher than a veteran at a corresponding position.

During the Browns' preseason in 1966, Morin impressed his coaches sufficiently that they moved four-year starter John Brewer to make room for Morin as the Browns' new starting tight end. In one 1966 preseason game, Moran had a 70-yard reception. In making him a starter, the Browns not only recognized Morin's ability as a short pass receiver, but also for his speed that made him capable of long pass receptions as well.

The 6 ft 4 in (1.93 m) 250 lb (113.4 kg) Morin started nine games as a rookie tight end for the Browns in 1966. He had 23 receptions for 333 yards, with three touchdown receptions. Morin's first professional touchdown reception was on a 20-yard pass from quarterback Frank Ryan against the New York Giants. He suffered a serious leg injury against the Philadelphia Eagles during the ninth game of the Browns' season, that required hospitalization. Through eight games that season he had 21 receptions for 297 yards and two touchdowns. He had a 16-yard touchdown reception against the Eagles before being carried off the field with a leg injury. He missed the next three games before returning to play, but only had one more pass reception in the season's final two games.

In 1967, Morin suffered a knee injury during a preseason game, and was in a cast for six weeks. He missed the majority of the 1967 season; appearing in only six games, without any starts. He had seven receptions for 90 yards on the season. He returned to start all 14 games at tight end for the Browns in 1968. Morin had career-highs of 43 receptions, 792 yards, and five touchdowns. His career-high 18.4 yards per reception was ninth best in the NFL, and best among tight ends that season. He caught an 87-yard touchdown pass in a late November game against the Philadelphia Eagles, which stood as a team record for 21 years. He was selected to play in the Pro Bowl, and The Sporting News named him first-team All-Conference. The Browns finished first in their division, and defeated the Dallas Cowboys 31–20 in the divisional round of the 1968 NFL playoffs. Morin had four receptions for 47 yards in that game. The Browns lost the 1968 NFL championship game to the Baltimore Colts, 34–0. Morin had three receptions for 41 yards.

In 1969, Morin suffered a herniated spinal disc and underwent back surgery in late June 1969, after months of pain. He originally was expected to need at least six months for recovery, and at best was not expected to play until mid-season. However, he was able to start by the first game of the season, against the Philadelphia Eagles on September 21. In the fourth game of the season, against the New Orleans Saints, head coach Blanton Collier decided to replace Morin at starting tight end with rookie Chip Glass, who Collier believed was playing better than Morin at that point in the season. Glass was injured against the Saints, and Morin returned to starting tight end the following week. Over the 1969 season, Morin started 12 games, with 37 receptions for 495 yards. The Browns again defeated the Dallas Cowboys in the divisional round of the playoffs, 38–14; with Morin catching four passes for 52 yards and one touchdown. The Browns lost to the Minnesota Vikings in the 1969 NFL championship game, 27–7; Morin having one reception for 18 yards.

Morin started 11 games at tight end in 1970, with 37 receptions for 611 yards and one touchdown. In 1971, Morin was selected to the play for the American Football Conference in the Pro Bowl. The Associated Press and United Press International both named him first-team All-AFC that season. He had 40 receptions for 581 yards and two touchdowns that year. The Browns won the AFC Central Division, but lost in the divisional round of the playoffs to the Baltimore Colts, 20–3; with Morin catching one pass for 16 yards.

Morin started all 14 games in 1972, with 30 receptions for 540 yards and one touchdown. He was tied for eighth in the NFL with 18 yards per reception, behind only Rich Caster and Ted Kwalick among tight ends. The Browns made the playoffs again, losing in the divisional round to the eventual Super Bowl VII champion Miami Dolphins, 20–14. Morin had one reception for 21 yards in that game. In 1973, Morin started 13 games, with 26 receptions for 417 yards and one touchdown.

The following season (1974), Morin started 10 games, with 27 receptions for 330 yards and three touchdowns. After getting off to their worst start in nearly two decades, Browns head coach Nick Skorich replaced a number of starters going into the season's sixth game against the Pittsburgh Steelers. This included starting Jim Thaxton at tight end over Morin. While Thaxton started, Morin still played and had three receptions for 46 yards and a touchdown, in a 20–16 loss. Moran and Thaxton alternated as starters during the remainder of the season, with Morin starting the final four games.

Rookie Oscar Roan won the starting tight end job from Morin coming out of the Browns' 1975 training camp. Roan started 13 games that season, and Morin rarely played, with only one start and one reception on the season. The Browns released Moran in early September 1976, before the season started; and Morin then announced his retirement from the NFL. At the time, over his ten years with the Browns Morin had 271 receptions for 4,208 yards, both records for Browns' tight ends.

== Legacy and honors ==
At 240 to 250 pounds, Morin was one of the first big sized tight ends in the NFL who was a skilled receiver and not simply a blocker. He was considered the greatest tight end in Browns’ history before Ozzie Newsome. When Morin announced his retirement from the NFL in early September 1976, Cleveland sportswriter Chuck Heaton observed "Morin's value to the club can't be measured in years or yards, however. This athlete contributed certain intangibles as a member of the squad and the Cleveland community". Browns team co-captain Doug Dieken said "Milt was great for this team in so many ways. Anytime there was anything he could do to help, he didn't have to be asked twice. You can't lose somebody like him and not miss him". During his time with the Browns, Morin regularly made appearances throughout Ohio, and developed an especially strong rapport with children.

On May 11, 2010, Morin was elected into the College Football Hall of Fame. He was inducted on July 17, 2010, eight days after he died. A moment of silence was held in Morin's honor during the enshrinement program. In 2014, he was honored as a Cleveland Browns Legend. In 1970, he was selected to be in the inaugural class of the UMass Hall of Fame.

When Morin was interviewed during the 1982 NFL players strike, he observed that at one time in the NFL's history, the owners and players both shared risks; the owners bearing a financial risk, and the players exposing themselves to physical risks. However, with the advent of lucrative television contracts for the owners, Morin believed that ownership of an NFL franchise had become virtually risk-free financially; also observing NFL teams did not have the expense of minor league systems found in Major League Baseball, since football players were trained in and selected from colleges and universities. On the other hand, the players were still bearing the same physical risks of a shortened career or long-term physical problems; with most players not making enough money during their careers to secure their futures.

Morin believed the NFL's monopoly power over the players needed to be resolved by free agency. He said that in his own experience, he attempted to negotiate a higher salary after his 1971 Pro Bowl season. Instead, owner Art Modell offered him a lower salary. When Morin asked Modell how he could offer less after Morin's successful season, Morin said Modell told him "I own the draft rights on you. You don't play for anybody else". At another time, when the Browns were not responsive to his salary demands, Morin walked out of training camp and told the team he was going to retire; after which they paid what he was seeking.

== Personal life and death ==
After retiring from football, Morin, his wife Ellen and their children (Monte and Ellen) lived in Hadley, Massachusetts. His chief occupation immediately after retirement was selling antiques and holding antiques shows. He and his father later built a country store, and operating that store took primacy over the antique business over time. He later became a house builder. He also reportedly worked as a corrections officer in Hadley.

On July 9, 2010, he died at Cooley Dickinson Hospital in Northampton, Massachusetts of a heart attack. His induction into the College Football Hall of Fame was scheduled for the following week.

== NFL career statistics ==
Legend
**Bold**	Career high

=== Regular season ===
Year	Team	Games		Receiving				
Year	Team	GP	GS	Rec	Yds	Avg	Lng	TD
1966	CLE	11	9	23	333	14.5	32	3
1967	CLE	6	0	7	90	12.9	21	0
1968	CLE	14	14	**43**	**792**	18.4	**87**	**5**
1969	CLE	14	12	37	495	13.4	35	0
1970	CLE	14	11	37	611	16.5	36	1
1971	CLE	14	14	40	581	14.5	31	2
1972	CLE	14	14	30	540	18.0	36	1
1973	CLE	14	13	26	417	16.0	51	1
1974	CLE	14	10	27	330	12.2	32	3
1975	CLE	14	1	1	19	**19.0**	19	0
Career		129	98	271	4,208	15.5	87	16

=== Playoffs ===
Year	Team	Games		Receiving				
Year	Team	GP	GS	Rec	Yds	Avg	Lng	TD
1967	CLE	1	0	3	35	11.7	13	**1**
1968	CLE	2	2	**7**	**88**	12.6	**22**	0
1969	CLE	2	2	5	70	14.0	19	**1**
1971	CLE	1	1	1	16	16.0	16	0
1972	CLE	1	1	1	21	**21.0**	21	0
Career		7	6	17	230	13.5	22	2
