= Walter Johnson (defensive tackle, born 1942) =

American football player and professional wrestler (1942–1999)

No. 71, 78
- Position: Defensive tackle

Personal information
- Born: November 13, 1942; Cincinnati, Ohio, U.S.
- Died: June 30, 1999 (aged 56); Mayfield Heights, Ohio, U.S.
- Listed height: 6 ft 4 in (1.93 m)
- Listed weight: 265 lb (120 kg)

Career information
- High school: Robert A. Taft (Cincinnati)
- College: New Mexico State; Los Angeles State
- NFL draft: 1965: 2nd round, 27th overall pick
- AFL draft: 1965: Red Shirt 2nd round, 9th overall pick

Career history
- Cleveland Browns (1965–1976); Cincinnati Bengals (1977)

Awards and highlights
- Second-team All-Pro (1968); 3× Pro Bowl (1967–1969); Cleveland Browns Legends; First-team Little All-American (1964); Second-team All-PCC (1964)

Career NFL statistics
- Sacks: 68.0
- Safeties: 1
- Interceptions: 2
- Fumble recoveries: 11
- Stats at Pro Football Reference

Walter Johnson III (November 13, 1942 – June 30, 1999) was an American professional football player. A defensive tackle, he was a three-time Pro Bowler (1967, 1968, 1969), a professional wrestler, and played 13 seasons in the National Football League (NFL). He was selected by the Cleveland Browns in the second round of the 1965 NFL draft. He is a member of the Cleveland Browns Legends.

Johnson played college football at New Mexico State University and Los Angeles State University. The Associated Press selected him as a first-team Little All-American in 1964, at offensive guard.

== Early life ==
Walter Johnson was born November 13, 1942, in Cincinnati, Ohio. He attended Robert A. Taft High School in Cincinnati, where he excelled in football, basketball, and as a member of the track and field team. He was named the school's outstanding sophomore in May 1959. Johnson played fullback on the school's football team in his junior and senior years. As a senior at running back, his team won the 1960 Public High School League championship; the first in school history. Along with Johnson at fullback, that team's backfield included three other future NFL players: Al Nelson, Cleophus "Cid" Edwards, and Carl Ward. One of Taft's only losses in 1960 came against Purcell High School and its quarterback, future Pro Football Hall of Famer Roger Staubach.

Johnson started on the 1960–61 Taft basketball team that won the Public High School League basketball championship. Johnson threw the shot put and discus on Taft's track team that won Public High School League and district championships two consecutive years. He set a Class AA Ohio southwestern district shot put record during a May 1961 regional track meet; and finished fourth in the statewide Ohio Class AA high school track finals that year.

== College career ==
Johnson attended New Mexico State University for one year. He played on the football team as a freshman, at tackle. He also played at fullback. He then went to Santa Ana Junior College, in Orange County, California, which was part of the Eastern Conference. Conference officials did not allow Johnson to play football at Santa Ana. In early 1963, Santa Ana football coach Homer Beatty took the head coaching position at Los Angeles State University (now California State University, Los Angeles), and Johnson followed Beatty to Los Angeles State.

When Johnson transferred to Los Angeles State he was reported to weigh 235 lb (106.6 kg) (also reported to be 265 lb (120 kg)), and was considered a fullback and tackle when entering Los Angeles State. In 1963, Beatty used the reported 235 lb Johnson as an offensive lineman.

In 1964, Los Angeles State was undefeated and United Press International (UPI) ranked them first nationally among small colleges. Johnson was reportedly 6 ft 3 in (1.91 m) 260 lb (117.9 kg) that season. He was a two-way player, playing offensive guard and middle linebacker that year. In 1964, the Associated Press (AP) selected Johnson as a first-team Little All-American at guard (weighing the most of any player selected to that team). Less than a week earlier, the AP had named Johnson first-team Little All-Pacific Coast at guard; and UPI named him second team All-Coast, also at guard. In addition to winning accolades as an offensive lineman that year, Johnson was also reported to have averaged over 10 tackles per game on defense in 1964.

He had the nickname "Little Walter" at Santa Ana and Los Angeles State.

== Professional football career ==
=== Professional drafts ===
Johnson was selected in the second round of the 1965 NFL draft by the Cleveland Browns (27th overall) and in the 1965 American Football League (AFL) Redshirt draft by the Denver Broncos. The NFL draft took place on November 28, 1964, and Johnson signed a contract with the Browns a few days later. This was during a period before the NFL/AFL merger when the NFL and AFL were competing to sign players drafted out of college. Johnson was still considered a college junior at the time of the draft, and it was reported that persons associated with Los Angeles State and coach Beatty were considering protesting to NFL Commissioner Pete Rozelle that it was improper to draft an underclassman. The Browns reportedly offered Johnson a considerable signing bonus to give up his last year of college eligibility, and he went on to play for the Browns in 1965, rather than returning to Los Angeles State.

=== Cleveland Browns ===
Although Johnson did not play as a defensive tackle in college, the Browns made Johnson a reserve defensive tackle in 1965 as a rookie. Johnson said he only really began playing as a defensive lineman for the first time when he joined the Browns. He started only one game in 1965, but still had significant playing time during the season. He played behind 13-year veteran Dick Modzelewski (left defensive tackle) and Jim Kanicki (right defensive tackle). The Browns reached the 1965 NFL Championship Game, losing to the Green Bay Packers, 23–12.

In 1966, Johnson replaced Modzelewski at left tackle. Johnson started all 14 games, with 5.5 quarterback sacks and one fumble recovery in his first full season. He was the Browns' fastest lineman, running the 40-yard dash in five seconds. Modzelewski later became Johnson's defensive line coach (1968 to 1975) and defensive coordinator (1976) with the Browns, and in 1970 said Johnson was "the best defensive tackle Cleveland ever had".

From 1967 to 1976, Johnson started all 14 games each season as the Browns' left defensive tackle, except in 1975 when he started 13 of 14 games. During his 13-year career with the Browns he played in 168 consecutive games; a team record at the time (1976). In 1967, Johnson was selected to the Pro Bowl for the first time. He had 7.5 sacks and one fumble recovery that season. His defensive linemates Bill Glass (right defensive end) and Paul Wiggin (left defensive end) also made the Pro Bowl. The team was 9–5, first place in the Century Division.

Johnson was selected to the Pro Bowl again in 1968, with 5.5 sacks and three fumble recoveries. The Newspaper Enterprise Association (NEA) named him second-team All-Pro. The Browns were again first in the Century Division and defeated the Dallas Cowboys in the first (divisional) round of the 1968 NFL playoffs, 31–20. At the end of his career, Johnson said he considered this his favorite game over his entire career. The Browns lost to the Baltimore Colts in the 1968 NFL Championship Game.

In 1969, Johnson was selected to the Pro Bowl for a third consecutive year. He had eight sacks and two fumble recoveries that season. He returned a Billy Kilmer fumble 12 yards for a touchdown in an October 12 game against the New Orleans Saints. The Browns were 10–3–1, and were first in the Century Division again. They defeated the Cowboys in the divisional round of the 1969 NFL playoffs, 38–14.

On January 4, 1970, the Browns played the Minnesota Vikings in Bloomington, Minnesota for the 1969 NFL championship, losing 27–7. The temperature that day, with the wind chill factor, reached –20 degrees Fahrenheit (–28.9 C). Johnson's right hand, which he planted in the ground in lining up on defense, suffered frostbite that day. He was hospitalized for a number of days at the Shaker Medical Center in Cleveland and nearly had to have one or more of his fingers amputated. Johnson had received a pain killing injection in his hand before the game to let him play more easily with a hand injury; and this may have made him unable to experience the full effects the extreme cold was having on his hand during the game. After the game he was in excruciating pain and groaned in pain on the flight back to Cleveland, where he was hospitalized.

In 1970, Johnson had 6.5 sacks, a safety (a sack of Virgil Carter vs. Cincinnati in the inaugural game of the Browns-Bengals rivalry) and an interception. In 1971, he had 5.5 sacks, and two fumble recoveries. He scored the second touchdown of his career on a fumble recovery in a December game against the Saints; after Browns' defensive end Joe Jones forced a fumble against Saints' quarterback Archie Manning and Johnson recovered it for a touchdown. Both of Johnson's career touchdowns were scored in New Orleans. In 1971, Johnson tied his career high with eight sacks, and had the second interception of his career. He received one vote for the AP's NFL Defensive Player of the Year, with only eight players receiving more votes.

From 1972 to 1976 with the Browns, he had a total of 16.5 sacks and two fumble recoveries. In 1976, he began splitting playing time with Earl Edwards at left tackle. Johnson demanded a trade as he still wanted to play full time. The Browns waived Johnson in June 1977, and Edwards became the starting left tackle in 1977.

In 12 years with the Browns, he played in 168 consecutive games, with 66 quarterback sacks, two interceptions, one safety, and 11 fumble recoveries, two of which he returned for touchdowns. He wore uniform No. 71 with the Browns. His nickname with the Browns was "Zoom" because of the speed with which he moved off the ball.

=== Cincinnati Bengals ===
After being released by the Browns, Johnson was picked up by the Philadelphia Eagles. The Eagles released him before the 1977 season started because Johnson did not fit their 3–4 defensive scheme. After being released, Johnson called Cincinnati Bengals' defensive coordinator Howard Brinker, who had coached with the Browns, to express his interest in playing with his hometown Bengals. The Bengals signed Johnson in early September 1977, and he played his final season with the Bengals. Johnson played in all 14 games, starting two games at defensive tackle, with two quarterback sacks. This was his last NFL season. The Bengals released Johnson in early 1978. Johnson stated it still was his intention to continue playing in the NFL. He had the opportunity for a tryout with the Washington Redskins in 1978, but could not move forward with that because of a back injury.

== Legacy and honors ==
In 2008, Johnson was inducted into the Cleveland Browns Legends. In a 2013 ranking of the 100 greatest Cleveland Browns' players, he was ranked 34th. He was honored by the Cleveland Touchdown Club for his 1968 season performance.

Johnson was considered one of the fastest defensive linemen in Browns' history. Dick Modzelewski, Johnson's teammate and coach, said Brown was "an exceptionally strong person with amazing speed and lateral movement. He reacts so fast he can get to a runner going through a hole on the other side of center". Cincinnati Bengals guard Pat Matson, who played against Johnson twice a year as the Bengals and Browns were in the same division, said "He plays the run probably as good as anybody". Johnson played in 182 consecutive games over his career. A teammate once said of Johnson, "You have to kill that guy before you can get him out of the lineup".

Johnson started alongside right defensive tackle Jim Kanicki from 1966 through 1969 (Kanicki missing over half of the 1969 season with a broken leg). They were considered one of the best tackle tandems in the NFL. Johnson later played alongside multi-time Pro Bowl right defensive tackle Jerry Sherk from 1970 to 1976. Johnson and Sherk were considered one of the NFL's very top tandems at defensive tackle. In early 1973, Baltimore Colts' head coach Howard Schnellenberger called them "the best tandem" in the NFL, and considered both Johnson and Sherk great at putting pressure on passing quarterbacks from the tackle position.

Johnson considered Hall of Fame offensive tackle Bob Brown the toughest opponent he ever faced, and Hall of Fame fullback Larry Csonka the most difficult player to tackle.

== Professional wrestling ==
In addition to his football career, Walter Johnson was a professional wrestler from 1968 to 1984. Johnson reportedly wrestled under his own name in territories including Cleveland, Akron, Cincinnati, Buffalo, Detroit, Indianapolis, Los Angeles, and with New Japan Pro-Wrestling, among other regions. Some of the promoters for whom he wrestled included Ed Farhat based in Detroit (The Sheik), and former Green Bay Packer turned professional wrestler Bill Afflis (Dick the Bruiser) based in Indianapolis.

Johnson had a wrestling rivalry with fellow NFL player Ron Pritchard, a linebacker for the Cincinnati Bengals who was also a professional wrestler in the off season. They would wrestle in Cleveland with Pritchard as the heel (bad guy), and Cincinnati with Johnson as the heel. In their first two matches, Johnson was disqualified for punching Pritchard during a Detroit bout, and then disqualified for bloodying Pritchard with a chair in their first Cincinnati match. Johnson's arguably most famous match happened on February 16, 1974 in Cincinnati against Pritchard, with the crowd becoming so animated other wrestlers and The Sheikh had to come out of the dressing room to calm the crowd. Pritchard won the match by disqualification. Fellow wrestler Big Jim Lancaster, who also performed that night, said Pritchard and Johnson were hitting each other so forcefully it was audible in the dressing room.

During the first part of his wrestling career, Johnson was not particularly adept in his technique as a professional wrestler, relying on football type moves and hitting his opponents harder than they expected. Johnson was a one-time NWA Americas Heavyweight Champion in NWA Hollywood Wrestling (also known as National Wrestling Alliance, Los Angeles). He defeated The Spoiler #2 (Ron Starr) on May 8, 1980 to win the title, and lost the title to John Tolos on August 8, 1980.

== Personal life and death ==
Johnson said he built his life around four principles, that he called the "A–B–C–D principles". He explained "'A' is for ability, 'B' is for belief, 'C' is for courage and 'D' is for desire". He was a volunteer with the Black Athletes Foundation for Sickle Cell Anemia.

Johnson worked as a youth counselor. He was a juvenile probation officer in Cleveland during the off season, while still an active NFL player (as early as 1966). After retiring from football, Johnson was involved in a number of businesses. He was the head of Alarm Pro Security in Cleveland.

Johnson's grandson Josh Johnson played football at Iowa Central Community College and later transferred to Hampton University where he finished his college football career, while earning a degree in psychology. Johnson's grandson Isaiah Johnson played college basketball at the University of Akron.

After suffering a heart attack, Johnson died at 56 years-old on June 30, 1999, at Meridia Hillcrest Hospital in Mayfield Heights, Ohio. He was survived by his father, his wife Gayle and their four children.

== See also ==
- List of gridiron football players who became professional wrestlers
