= Frank Pitts =

American football player (1943–2026)

No. 25, 85
- Position: Wide receiver

Personal information
- Born: November 12, 1943; Atlanta, Georgia, U.S.
- Died: January 16, 2026 (aged 82)
- Listed height: 6 ft 3 in (1.91 m)
- Listed weight: 199 lb (90 kg)

Career information
- High school: Archer (Lawrenceville, Georgia)
- College: Southern
- NFL draft: 1965: 16th round, 213th overall pick
- AFL draft: 1965: 4th round, 32nd overall pick

Career history
- Kansas City Chiefs (1965-1970); Cleveland Browns (1971–1973); Oakland Raiders (1974)

Awards and highlights
- Super Bowl champion (IV); 2× AFL champion (1966, 1969)

Career NFL/AFL statistics
- Receptions: 175
- Receiving yards: 2,897
- Receiving touchdowns: 27
- Stats at Pro Football Reference

Frank H. Pitts (November 12, 1943 – January 16, 2026) was an American professional football player who was a wide receiver in the American Football League (AFL) and National Football League (NFL). He played college football for the Southern Jaguars. He played professionally for 10 seasons with the AFL's Kansas City Chiefs (1965–1969) and then the NFL's Chiefs (1970), Cleveland Browns (1971–1973) and Oakland Raiders (1974).

== Kansas City Chiefs ==
Pitts was selected by the Chiefs in the fourth round of the 1965 AFL draft. He had speed and desire, but throughout the wide receiver's first three seasons in Kansas City, he acquired a "bad hands" label. However, he worked through the problem, and when starting wide receiver Otis Taylor was injured in 1968, Pitts stepped in. He was a starter the next three seasons, and his end around reverse runs became a big part of the Chiefs' offense.

=== Super Bowl IV ===
Hank Stram told the play to Chiefs quarterback Len Dawson. "Listen, let's have a ... 9-0-8, 51 G-O reverse." As Dawson ran back to the huddle, Stram told everyone on the sidelines, "Here comes the reverse from Tight I, it could be wide open." Dawson took the snap, faked to Wendell Hayes on the left side of the line, then turned the ball to a sprinting Frank Pitts, who turned the corner and jetted down the right sideline for 20 yards. It was one of the biggest plays of the Chiefs' Super Bowl IV win over the Minnesota Vikings, and it set up Jan Stenerud's third field goal of the game.

Pitts ran the reverse again in the third quarter and picked up a critical first down. Otis Taylor scored on the next play.

In 74 games for Kansas City, Pitts caught 78 passes for 11 touchdowns and ran the ball 24 times for 238 yards and one touchdown.

== Cleveland and Oakland ==
The Chiefs traded Pitts to the Cleveland Browns before the start of the 1971 season, where he became one of their starting wide receivers. He finished his career with the Oakland Raiders.

== Personal life and death ==
Pitts resided in Baton Rouge, Louisiana. He was married to Diane Guidry Pitts and they had three children. Pitts died on January 16, 2026, at the age of 82.

His grandson, Brandon Bolden, played running back collegiately at Ole Miss and in the NFL for the New England Patriots, Miami Dolphins, and Las Vegas Raiders.

== NFL/AFL career statistics ==
Legend
	Won the Super Bowl
	Won the AFL championship
**Bold**	Career high

=== Regular season ===
Year	Team	Games		Receiving				
Year	Team	GP	GS	Rec	Yds	Avg	Lng	TD
1965	KAN	7	0	1	11	11.0	11	0
1966	KAN	14	0	1	11	11.0	11	0
1967	KAN	14	2	4	131	**32.8**	59	1
1968	KAN	13	10	30	**655**	21.8	**90**	6
1969	KAN	14	14	31	470	15.2	51	2
1970	KAN	12	10	11	172	15.6	54	2
1971	CLE	13	6	27	487	18.0	53	4
1972	CLE	14	13	**36**	620	17.2	80	**8**
1973	CLE	13	12	31	317	10.2	26	4
1974	OAK	13	0	3	23	7.7	11	0
		127	67	175	2,897	16.6	90	27

=== Playoffs ===
Year	Team	Games		Receiving				
Year	Team	GP	GS	Rec	Yds	Avg	Lng	TD
1966	KAN	2	0	0	0	0.0	0	0
1968	KAN	1	1	**5**	56	11.2	31	0
1969	KAN	3	3	**5**	**68**	**13.6**	**41**	0
1971	CLE	1	1	0	0	0.0	0	0
1972	CLE	1	1	0	0	0.0	0	0
1974	OAK	2	0	1	5	5.0	5	0
		10	6	11	129	11.7	41	0

== See also ==
- Other American Football League players
