= Craig Wycinsky =

American football player (born 1948)

No. 67
- Position: Guard

Personal information
- Born: January 4, 1948 (age 78); Detroit, Michigan, U.S.
- Listed height: 6 ft 3 in (1.91 m)
- Listed weight: 243 lb (110 kg)

Career information
- High school: Farmington Hills (MI) North Farmington
- College: Michigan State
- NFL draft: 1970: 7th round, 177th overall pick

Career history
- Cleveland Browns (1972)

Career NFL statistics
- Games played: 6
- Stats at Pro Football Reference

Craig Peter Wycinsky (born January 4, 1948) is an American former professional football player who was a guard for the Cleveland Browns of the National Football League (NFL) in 1972. He played college football for the Michigan State Spartans.
