= Clifford Brooks =

American football player (born 1949)

No. 23, 48
- Position: Defensive back

Personal information
- Born: June 21, 1949 (age 77); Pineland, Texas, U.S.
- Listed height: 6 ft 1 in (1.85 m)
- Listed weight: 190 lb (86 kg)

Career information
- College: Tennessee State
- NFL draft: 1972: 2nd round, 45th overall pick

Career history
- Cleveland Browns (1972–1974); Philadelphia Eagles (1975–1976); Buffalo Bills (1976); New York Jets (1976)
- Stats at Pro Football Reference

Clifford Brooks Jr. (born June 21, 1949) is an American former professional football player who was a defensive back in the National Football League (NFL) for the Cleveland Browns, Philadelphia Eagles, Buffalo Bills, and New York Jets. He played college football for the Tennessee State Tigers and was selected in the second round of the 1972 NFL draft.

Brooks was born in Pineland, Texas, and earned a Bachelor of Science in Business Administration in 1972. He became Vice-president/Commercial Lending for First City National Bank, Houston, where he remained for thirteen years. He started Brooks Associates, a business management company, in 1990. In 2000, he became part owner of an ambulance company, assuming 100% ownership in 2002, but sold the company in 2007.

In 2008, he incorporated and became part owner of a crane servicing company, providing inspections, repairs, parts, and training for companies operating on-shore and off-shore hydraulic pedestal cranes in the oil and gas exploration industry.
