= Bill Bell (American football) =

American gridiron football player (1947–2022)

- Bell in 1972

No. 37, 8
- Position: Placekicker

Personal information
- Born: December 9, 1947; Fort Knox, Kentucky, U.S.
- Died: June 25, 2022 (aged 74)
- Listed height: 6 ft 0 in (1.83 m)
- Listed weight: 192 lb (87 kg)

Career information
- High school: Falls Church (West Falls Church, Virginia)
- College: Kansas (1966–1969)
- NFL draft: 1970: 17th round, 428th overall pick

Career history
- Atlanta Falcons (1971–1972); New England Patriots (1973)
- Stats at Pro Football Reference

William Stephen Bell (December 9, 1947 – June 25, 2022) was an American professional football placekicker who played three seasons in the National Football League (NFL) with the Atlanta Falcons and New England Patriots. He was selected by the Falcons in the 17th round of the 1970 NFL draft after playing college football at the University of Kansas.

== Early life and college ==
William Stephen Bell was born on December 9, 1947, in Fort Knox, Kentucky. He attended Falls Church High School in West Falls Church, Virginia.

Bell played college football for the Kansas Jayhawks of the University of Kansas. He was on the freshman team in 1966 and was a three-year letterman from 1967 to 1969. He wore jersey number 100 in 1969 while playing for the Jayhawks as part of the celebration of the 100th anniversary of college football; he is one of only two players to wear a number higher than 99 in an officially sanctioned football game (Chuck Kinder, who wore the number 100 in 1963, is the other).

== Professional career ==
Bell was selected by the Atlanta Falcons in the 17th round, with the 428th overall pick, of the 1970 NFL draft. He was cut by the Falcons on September 7, 1970. He signed with the Falcons again in 1971. Bell played in all 14 games for the Falcons during the 1970 season, converting 13 of 21 field goals and 29 of 33 extra points while also punting 16 times for 577 yards. He played in all 14 games for the second consecutive year in 1972, making 16 of 30 field goals and 31 of 31 extra points. He was waived by the Falcons on July 24, 1973.

Bell was claimed off waivers by the New England Patriots on July 25, 1973. He appeared in three games for New England in 1973, converting one of four field goals and four of five extra points. He was waived on October 2, 1973, due to poor play.

== Personal life ==
As of 2004, Bell was serving as Director of Buildings and Grounds in Douglas County, Kansas, a position he had held since 1988. Bell died on June 25, 2022.
