= Chris Morris (American football, born 1949) =

American football player (born 1949)

Profile
- Position: Tackle

Personal information
- Born: October 7, 1949 (age 77); Indianapolis, Indiana, U.S.
- Listed height: 6 ft 3 in (1.91 m)
- Listed weight: 250 lb (113 kg)

Career information
- High school: Southport (Indianapolis)
- College: Indiana
- NFL draft: 1971: 10th round, 258th overall pick

Career history
- Baltimore Colts (1971)*; Cleveland Browns (1972-1973); Memphis Southmen (1974); San Antonio Wings (1975); New Orleans Saints (1975)
- * Offseason or practice squad member only

Career NFL statistics
- Games played: 22
- Games started: 1
- Stats at Pro Football Reference

Christopher Steven Morris (born October 7, 1949) is an American former professional football player who was an offensive lineman in the National Football League (NFL) and World Football League (WFL). He played college football for the Indiana Hoosiers (1967–1970) and professionally for the Cleveland Browns (1972–1973), Memphis Southmen (1974), San Antonio Wings (1975), and New Orleans Saints (1975).

== Early life ==
Morris was born in Indianapolis in 1949 and attended that city's Southport High School.

== Indiana ==
Morris enrolled at Indiana University in 1967 and played college football for the Indiana Hoosiers football teams from 1967 to 1970. He enrolled in Indiana as a walk-on and won a scholarship as a sophomore. He began as a guard, switched to tackle as a junor, and started 20 consecutive games in 1969 and 1970. At the end of the 1970 season, he received Indiana's most valuable player award. He was the first interior lineman to win the award since 1958.

== Professional football ==
Morris was selected by the Minnesota Vikings in the 10th round (258th pick) of the 1971 NFL draft. He was cut by the Vikings in August 1971. After being released by the Vikings, he signed as a free agent with teh Cleveland Browns in 1972. He played at offensive tackle for the Browns, appearing in 14 games in 1972 and two games in 1973.

Prior to the 1974 season, Morris was cut by the Browns and joined the Memphis Southmen of the World Football League (WFL). In June 1975, the Grizzlies traded Morris to the San Antonio Wings of the WFL. He scored five touhdowns for the Wings. He then joined the New Orleans Saints, appearing in six games for the Saints in 1975. He appeared in 22 NFL games.

== Lawsuit ==
On October 22, 1975, shortly after the WFL folded, NFL commissioner Pete Rozelle announced any players free from WFL contracts could sign with an NFL team until October 28. However, he revoked this decision two days later after the Memphis Southmen threatened to sue the NFL. Morris then sued the NFL in November 1975 and signed with the Saints nine days later. In February 1977, Morris officially won the lawsuit after a judge ruled that the NFL had violated the Sherman Antitrust Act.
