= Billy Lefear =

American football player (born 1950)

No. 19, 26
- Positions: Running back, wide receiver

Personal information
- Born: February 12, 1950 (age 76); Magnolia, Arkansas, U.S.
- Listed height: 5 ft 11 in (1.80 m)
- Listed weight: 197 lb (89 kg)

Career information
- High school: Booker T. Washington (El Dorado, Arkansas)
- College: Henderson State
- NFL draft: 1972: 9th round, 230th overall pick

Career history
- Cleveland Browns (1972–1975)
- Stats at Pro Football Reference

Billy Ray Lefear (born February 12, 1950) is an American former professional football player who was a running back and wide receiver and special teams for the Cleveland Browns of the National Football League (NFL). He played college football for the Henderson State Reddies.
