= Ken Brown (running back) =

American football player (1945–2001)

No. 30
- Position: Running back

Personal information
- Born: November 8, 1945; Holdenville, Oklahoma, U.S.
- Died: January 11, 2001 (aged 55); Oklahoma City, Oklahoma, U.S.
- Listed height: 5 ft 10 in (1.78 m)
- Listed weight: 203 lb (92 kg)

Career information
- High school: Oklahoma City (OK) Frederick Douglass

Career history
- Cleveland Browns (1970–1975)

Career statistics
- Rushing yards: 1,193
- Average: 3.4
- Touchdowns: 9
- Stats at Pro Football Reference

Kenneth J. Brown (November 8, 1945 – January 11, 2001) was an American football running back in the National Football League (NFL). He played for the Cleveland Browns from 1970 to 1975.
