= Harold Sauerbrei =

Personal information
- Born: March 28, 1916
- Died: September 27, 1974 (aged 58); Cleveland, Ohio, U.S.

Career information
- College: Baldwin–Wallace College

Career history
- Cleveland Browns (1954–1960) Publicity director; Cleveland Browns (1961–1962) Business manager; Cleveland Browns (1963–1974) General manager
- Executive profile at Pro Football Reference

Harold Frederick Sauerbrei (March 28, 1916 – September 27, 1974) was an American journalist and sports executive who served as general manager of the Cleveland Browns from 1963 to 1974.

Sauerbrei attended Baldwin–Wallace College and covered the Cleveland Browns for The Plain Dealer for the team's first 8 season. In 1954 he joined the Browns as the team's publicity director. He later served as the team's business manager and on January 16, 1963, was named general manager of the Browns. He held this position until his death on September 27, 1974.
