= Bob Hoskins (American football) =

American football player (1945–1980)

No. 77, 56
- Position: Defensive tackle

Personal information
- Born: September 16, 1945; Highland, Illinois, U.S.
- Died: June 8, 1980 (aged 34); Redwood City, California, U.S.
- Listed height: 6 ft 2 in (1.88 m)
- Listed weight: 246 lb (112 kg)

Career information
- High school: Edwardsville (Edwardsville, Illinois)
- College: Wichita State (1965-1968)
- NFL draft: 1969: 16th round, 406th overall pick

Career history
- Seattle Rangers (1968); San Francisco 49ers (1969–1975)

Career NFL statistics
- Fumble recoveries: 9
- Sacks: 23.5
- Stats at Pro Football Reference

Robert Juan Hoskins (September 16, 1945 – June 8, 1980) was an American professional football player who was a defensive tackle in the National Football League (NFL). He was selected by the San Francisco 49ers in the 16th round of the 1969 NFL/AFL draft. He played college football for the Wichita State Shockers.

Hoskins was born to a large family, having nine siblings. He attended high school in Edwardsville, lettering in football, baseball, and track. He received a scholarship to Wichita State, where he played for two years as a fullback and defensive end. He left the university due to family obligations before completing his eligibility.

In 1969, he played minor league football for the Seattle Rangers of the Continental Football League (COFL), where he earned all-league honors as a defensive lineman. A tryout in the Canadian Football League (CFL) was unsuccessful, however in the spring of 1969, he was drafted by the 49ers.

Hoskins suffered injuries and saw little playing time in his first two seasons. However, playing on special teams in the 1971 NFC divisional playoff against the Washington Redskins, he recovered a mis-snapped ball in the end zone, in what proved to be the winning touchdown. Hoskins started all 14 games the next four seasons.

In 1974, in the midst of his career, Hoskins was diagnosed with Hodgkin's Disease and underwent treatment. This included two surgeries followed by cobalt therapy. Nonetheless, he was able to remain a starter until his retirement at age 30 after the 1975 season.

He died of a heart attack in 1980.
