= John Demarie =

American football player (1945–2015)

No. 55, 65
- Positions: Guard, Tackle, Center

Personal information
- Born: August 28, 1945; Oxnard, California, U.S.
- Died: November 29, 2015 (aged 70); Lake Charles, Louisiana, U.S.
- Listed height: 6 ft 3 in (1.91 m)
- Listed weight: 246 lb (112 kg)

Career information
- High school: LaGrange (LA)
- College: LSU (1963-1966)
- NFL draft: 1967: 6th round, 152nd overall pick

Career history
- Cleveland Browns (1967–1975); Seattle Seahawks (1976)

Career NFL statistics
- Games played: 132
- Games started: 110
- Fumble recoveries: 4
- Stats at Pro Football Reference

John Eddie Demarie (August 28, 1945 – November 29, 2015) was an American professional football player who played in ten National Football League (NFL) seasons from 1967 to 1976 for the Cleveland Browns and the Seattle Seahawks.
