= Bubba Pena =

American football player (born 1949)

No. 68
- Position: Guard

Personal information
- Born: August 8, 1949 (age 77); Wareham, Massachusetts, U.S.
- Listed height: 6 ft 2 in (1.88 m)
- Listed weight: 268 lb (122 kg)

Career information
- High school: Lawrence (Falmouth, MA)
- College: UMass
- NFL draft: 1971: 4th round, 92nd overall pick

Career history
- Cleveland Browns (1971–1974)

Awards and highlights
- UMass Hall of Fame Class of 2015; Dean College Hall of Fame Class of 1991; Lawrence High School Hall of Fame Class of 1998; 2× All-Yankee Conference (1969, 1970); 2× All-New England (1967, 1968); 1970 UMass MVP
- Stats at Pro Football Reference

Robert "Bubba" Pena (born August 8, 1949) is a former National Football League (NFL) offensive lineman who played four seasons with the Cleveland Browns from 1971 to 1974.

== High school ==
Pena attended Lawrence High School in Falmouth, Massachusetts, from 1963 to 1967, playing football there all four years. He started on the varsity team his last two years, helping the Lancers reach a combined 17–1 record. He also helped Lawrence complete its first undefeated season. Pena received nearly 60 college recruitment letters during his junior season alone, but he ultimately chose to stay close to home to attend Dean College (then Dean Junior College).

Pena was inducted into the Lawrence/Falmouth High School Athletic Hall of Fame as part of the 1998 class.

== College career ==
Pena played two seasons for the Dean Bulldogs in 1967 and 1968, and was chosen as team captain in both years. The team went 3-4 and 2–6 in his two seasons. Despite Dean's records, Pena earned All-New England selections in both years. After the 1968 season, Pena decided to play football with the University of Massachusetts Amherst Redmen (now called Minutemen) for his remaining two years of collegiate eligibility. Pena was inducted into the Dean College Hall of Fame as part of the 1991 class.

In the 1969 season, Pena helped the Redmen win the Yankee Conference with a 5-0 conference record and a 6-3 overall record. He earned All-Yankee Conference honors for his efforts. The Redmen declined in the 1970 season, amassing a 3-1-1 conference record and a 4-5-1 overall record, but Pena's skill did not fall with them. He earned All-Yankee Conference honors for the second straight season and was awarded the 1970 UMass MVP, marking the first time an offensive lineman won the award. As his collegiate eligibility expired after the 1970 season, Pena entered the 1971 NFL draft. He was later inducted into the UMass Amherst Hall of Fame as part of the 2015 class.

== Professional career ==
Pena was selected in the fourth round of the 1971 NFL Draft (92nd overall) by the Cleveland Browns. He is the fourth-highest draft pick in UMass history.

Through training camp in his rookie year, Pena earned a starting spot on the offensive line. However, there was a contract dispute between Browns owner Art Modell and Pena, hindering his ability to start for the team. After finishing contract negotiations, Pena suffered a knee injury that forced him to sit out most of his first year. Pena contemplated quitting football altogether after the injury, but Modell convinced him to stay and promised him a starting spot the following year. In the 1972 season, Pena saw considerable time on the field, starting 4 games and playing in 7 for the Browns. The Browns made the playoffs that year with a 10–4 record. Pena was named to the 1972 All-Rookie team, as he was eligible because of the amount of time he missed in the prior season.

In the following seasons, Pena was unable to stay on the field due to continuous knee injuries. Repeated surgeries and cortisone shots forced him to retire before the 1975 season.

== Personal life ==
After retirement, Pena went on to create and manage Mortage Security, Inc. In 2017, he pleaded guilty to one count of conspiracy and six counts of wire fraud for creating a scheme to defraud Ginnie Mae. He was sentenced to 32 months in prison and ordered to pay Ginnie Mae $2.5 million in restitution in April 2019.

In April 2020, Pena requested his release from a Massachusetts prison in light of the 2019 coronavirus pandemic. The situation in the prison made it impossible to follow social distancing guidelines, which prompted Pena, who was in a highly susceptible demographic, to file the motion.
