= Joe Jones (defensive end) =

American football player (born 1948)

No. 80, 64, 77
- Position: Defensive end

Personal information
- Born: January 7, 1948 (age 78); Dallas, Texas, U.S.
- Listed height: 6 ft 6 in (1.98 m)
- Listed weight: 250 lb (113 kg)

Career information
- College: Tennessee State (1968–1969)
- NFL draft: 1970: 2nd round, 36th overall pick

Career history
- Cleveland Browns (1970–1973); Philadelphia Eagles (1974–1975); Cleveland Browns (1975–1978); Washington Redskins (1979–1980)

Awards and highlights
- First-team Little All-American (1969)

Career NFL statistics
- Sacks: 46.5
- Fumble recoveries: 5
- Interceptions: 1
- Defensive touchdowns: 1
- Stats at Pro Football Reference

Joseph Willie "Turkey" Jones (born January 7, 1948) is an American former professional football player who was a defensive end for 11 seasons in the National Football League (NFL) with the Cleveland Browns (1970–1973; 1975–1978), Philadelphia Eagles (1974–1975) and Washington Redskins (1979–1980). He played college football for the Tennessee State Tigers.

== Turkey nickname ==
Per Jones' daughter, Leone Jones Hopewell, he did earn his "Turkey" nickname just before Thanksgiving during his rookie season with the Browns in 1970. The veterans on the team pulled a prank on the rookies by sending them off to distant farms to get nonexistent "free turkeys" for the holiday. Jones continued his futile search for hours, long after his fellow rookies had abandoned theirs. He fell for the same prank again the following year. The not-true story his nickname was because he bobbed his head like a turkey when he ran so some college teammates started calling him Turkey. By the end of his rookie season, he had worked his way into the starting lineup, but a knee injury sidelined him in 1972. Cleveland traded him to the Philadelphia Eagles in 1974, but he was cut the next year, and he re-signed with Cleveland.

== Terry Bradshaw incident ==
In 1976, Jones was back in the starting lineup when Pittsburgh rolled into Cleveland for a game with their biggest rivals, the Browns. Although Hal Lebovitz called it Jones' best game at the end of the third quarter, Jones' legacy as the instigator in one of the dirtiest plays in recent memory was made in the 4th. Jones lined up for a play, beat the offensive lineman (Larry Brown) and wrapped his arms around quarterback Terry Bradshaw. Whistles blew, but Jones ignored them and lifted Bradshaw up high, and slammed the Pittsburgh QB on his head. As Bradshaw laid there motionless on the ground, the officials marched off a 15-yard penalty for roughing. Bradshaw ended up with a concussion, and Jones ended up with a $3,000 fine.
