= Howard Brinker =

American football coach

Howard Brinker (died January 3, 2004) was a National Football League (NFL) assistant coach. He served as defensive coordinator for the Cleveland Browns from 1954 to 1973, and the Cincinnati Bengals from 1976 to 1979.

== Coaching timeline ==
- 1952–1953 Cleveland Browns - Defensive assistant
- 1954–1973 Cleveland Browns - Defensive coordinator
- 1976–1979 Cincinnati Bengals - Defensive coordinator
