= Fair Hooker =

American football player (born 1947)

No. 43
- Position: Wide receiver

Personal information
- Born: May 22, 1947 (age 79); Los Angeles, California, U.S.
- Listed height: 6 ft 1 in (1.85 m)
- Listed weight: 190 lb (86 kg)

Career information
- High school: Monrovia (Monrovia, California)
- College: Arizona State
- NFL draft: 1969: 5th round, 124th overall pick

Career history
- Cleveland Browns (1969–1974)

Career NFL statistics
- Receptions: 129
- Receiving yards: 1,845
- Touchdowns: 8
- Stats at Pro Football Reference

Fair Hooker (born May 22, 1947) is an American former professional football player who was a wide receiver in the National Football League (NFL). He was selected by the Cleveland Browns in the fifth round of the 1969 NFL/AFL draft. He played college football for the Arizona State Sun Devils.

Hooker was also an All-American hurdler for the Arizona State Sun Devils track and field team, finishing 7th in the 110 meters hurdles at the 1968 NCAA University Division outdoor track and field championships.

Hooker was traded by the Cleveland Browns to the New Orleans Saints in August 1974.
