= Bo Scott =

American gridiron football player (1943–2021)

No. 35, 37
- Position: Running back

Personal information
- Born: March 30, 1943; Connellsville, Pennsylvania, U.S.
- Died: August 4, 2021 (aged 78); Columbus, Ohio, U.S.
- Listed height: 6 ft 3 in (1.91 m)
- Listed weight: 215 lb (98 kg)

Career information
- High school: Connellsville Area (PA)
- College: Ohio State
- NFL draft: 1965: 3rd round, 32nd overall pick
- AFL draft: 1965: 20th round, 155th overall pick

Career history
- Ottawa Rough Riders (1965–1968); Cleveland Browns (1969–1974)

Awards and highlights
- Grey Cup champion (1968); 2× CFL All-Star (1965, 1967); 4× CFL Eastern All-Star (1965–1968); NFL kickoff return yards leader (1969)

Career NFL statistics
- Rushing yards: 2,124
- Rushing average: 3.8
- Receptions: 112
- Receiving yards: 826
- Total touchdowns: 24
- Stats at Pro Football Reference

Robert Marilla Scott (March 30, 1943 – August 4, 2021) was a gridiron football running back for the Cleveland Browns in the National Football League (NFL).

== Biography ==
Scott played at the collegiate level for Ohio State University and was selected 32nd overall by the Browns in the third round of the 1965 NFL draft. Because the Browns' backfield was already full of quality backs, such as future Hall of Fame rushers Jim Brown and Leroy Kelly, as well as Ernie Green, Scott elected to sign for the Ottawa Rough Riders of the Canadian Football League. In Canada, he was named a CFL all-star and helped the team to the 1968 Grey Cup championship. After joining the Browns in 1969, Scott rushed for 2,124 yards and 18 touchdowns in 554 attempts in his Cleveland career.

Scott was the starting fullback for the Browns from 1970-1972. After his playing time diminished in 1973 and 1974, Scott was waived by Cleveland on August 8, 1975.

== Death ==
He died on August 4, 2021, in Columbus, Ohio, at the age of seventy-eight.
