= 1971 Baltimore Colts season =

19th season in franchise history; final one under ownership of Carroll Rosenbloom

- Owner: Carroll Rosenbloom
- General manager: Don Klosterman
- Head coach: Don McCafferty
- Home stadium: Memorial Stadium

Results
- Record: 10–4
- Division place: 2nd AFC East
- Playoffs: Won Divisional Playoffs (at Browns) 20–3; Lost AFC Championship (at Dolphins) 0–21

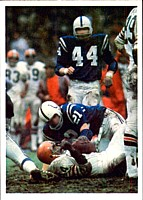
The Colts playing against the Browns in the 1971 AFC Divisional Playoffs Game.

The 1971 Baltimore Colts season was the 19th season for the team in the National Football League. Led by second-year head coach Don McCafferty, the Colts appeared to be on the verge of winning the AFC East again after beating the Miami Dolphins 14–3 in the penultimate game of the regular season. However, the Colts lost the final game of the season at home to the New England Patriots, dropping them to 10–4 and the wild card berth. They lost to the Dolphins in the AFC Championship game. The Baltimore defense gave up a total of 140 points for 14 regular season games, an average of ten points a game. In their four defeats, they lost by a combined total of 15 points. Only the Vikings had a better defense in football that year, giving up only 139 points.

This was the final season under the ownership of Carroll Rosenbloom, who traded franchises with the Los Angeles Rams in July 1972, with players and coaching staffs remaining intact. The Colts divisional round win against Cleveland would ultimately be their final playoff victory as a Baltimore franchise. It would be another 24 years before the team, now based on Indianapolis, won another postseason game.

== Offseason ==
=== NFL draft ===
| Round | Pick | Player | Position | School/Club team |

== Personnel ==
=== Staff/coaches ===
1971 Baltimore Colts staff
| Front office: Owner/president and treasurer – Carroll Rosenbloom; General manager – Don Klosterman; Coaching staff: Head coach – Don McCafferty; Offensive coaches: Receivers/offensive ends – Dick Bielski; Offensive coordinator – John Idzik; Offensive line coach – Red Miller | Defensive coaches: Defensive coordinator/defensive line – John Sandusky; Defensive backfield – Bobby Boyd; Linebackers coach – Hank Bullough |

=== Roster ===
1971 Baltimore Colts roster
| Quarterbacks (QB): 15 Earl Morrall; 19 Johnny Unitas; Running backs (RB): 41 Tom Matte; 23 Don McCauley; 48 Don Nottingham; 42 Charlie Pittman; Wide receivers (WR): 17 Sam Havrilak; 33 Eddie Hinton; 27 Ray Perkins; 87 Willie Richardson; Tight ends (TE): 88 John Mackey; 84 Tom Mitchell | Offensive linemen (OL): 50 Bill Curry C; 61 Cornelius Johnson G; 67 Lynn Larson T; 57 Ken Mendenhall C; 68 Dennis Nelson T; 62 Glenn Ressler G; 72 Bob Vogel T; 65 John Williams G; Defensive linemen (DL): 79 Jim Bailey DT; 85 Roy Hilton DE; 76 Fred Miller DT; 81 Billy Newsome DT; 78 Bubba Smith DE; 74 George Wright DT | Linebackers (LB): 53 Tom Beutler MLB; 32 Mike Curtis MLB; 83 Ted Hendricks OLB; 51 Bill Laskey OLB; 56 Ray May OLB; 34 Tom Nowatzke OLB; Defensive backs (DB): 25 Tom Curtis FS; 43 Lonnie Hepburn CB; 44 Rex Kern CB; 20 Jerry Logan SS; 47 Charlie Stukes CB; 21 Rick Volk FS; Special teams (ST): 49 David Lee P; 80 Jim O'Brien K | Practice squad: 86 John Andrews TE; 19 Karl Douglas QB; 69 Rusty Ganas DT; Reserve: 36 Norm Bulaich RB (IR); 35 Jim Duncan CB (IR); 46 Lenny Dunlap CB (IR); 52 Robbie Nichols LB (IR); 28 Cotton Speyrer WR (IR); 71 Dan Sullivan T (IR); 63 Bobby Wuensch G (IR); Rookies in italics |

== Regular season ==
=== Schedule ===
| Week | Date | Opponent | Result | Record | Venue | Attendance |
|---|---|---|---|---|---|---|
| 1 | September 19 | **New York Jets** | **W** 22–0 | 1–0 | Memorial Stadium | 56,458 |
| 2 | September 26 | Cleveland Browns | **L** 13–14 | 1–1 | Memorial Stadium | 56,837 |
| 3 | October 3 | at **New England Patriots** | **W** 23–3 | 2–1 | Schaefer Stadium | 61,232 |
| 4 | October 10 | at **Buffalo Bills** | **W** 43–0 | 3–1 | War Memorial Stadium | 46,206 |
| 5 | October 17 | at New York Giants | **W** 31–7 | 4–1 | Yankee Stadium | 62,860 |
| 6 | October 25 | at Minnesota Vikings | **L** 3–10 | 4–2 | Metropolitan Stadium | 49,784 |
| 7 | October 31 | Pittsburgh Steelers | **W** 34–21 | 5–2 | Memorial Stadium | 60,238 |
| 8 | November 8 | Los Angeles Rams | **W** 24–17 | 6–2 | Memorial Stadium | 57,722 |
| 9 | November 14 | at **New York Jets** | **W** 14–13 | 7–2 | Shea Stadium | 63,947 |
| 10 | November 21 | at **Miami Dolphins** | **L** 14–17 | 7–3 | Miami Orange Bowl | 75,312 |
| 11 | November 28 | at Oakland Raiders | **W** 37–14 | 8–3 | Oakland–Alameda County Coliseum | 54,689 |
| 12 | December 5 | **Buffalo Bills** | **W** 24–0 | 9–3 | Memorial Stadium | 58,476 |
| 13 | December 11 | **Miami Dolphins** | **W** 14–3 | 10–3 | Memorial Stadium | 60,238 |
| 14 | December 19 | **New England Patriots** | **L** 17–21 | 10–4 | Memorial Stadium | 57,942 |
Note: Intra-division opponents are in **bold** text.

=== Game summaries ===
==== Week 1 ====
| Team | 1 | 2 | 3 | 4 | Total |
|---|---|---|---|---|---|
| Jets | 0 | 0 | 0 | 0 | 0 |
| • Colts | 10 | 9 | 0 | 3 | 22 |

- Date: September 19
- Location: Memorial Stadium
- Game start: 4:00 p.m. EDT
- Game attendance: 56,458
- Game weather:
  72 °F (22 °C); wind 8 mph (13 km/h)

Scoring summary
| Q1 | BAL | O'Brien 38 yard field goal | BAL 3–0 |
| Q1 | BAL | Matte 1 yard run (O'Brien kick) | BAL 10–0 |
| Q2 | BAL | O'Brien 21 yard field goal | BAL 13–0 |
| Q2 | BAL | Bulaich 67 yard run (kick failed) | BAL 19–0 |
| Q4 | BAL | O'Brien 21 yard field goal | BAL 22–0 |

=== Standings ===
AFC East
| | W | L | T | PCT | DIV | CONF | PF | PA | STK |
|---|---|---|---|---|---|---|---|---|---|
| Miami Dolphins | 10 | 3 | 1 | .769 | 5–3 | 7–3–1 | 315 | 174 | W1 |
| Baltimore Colts | 10 | 4 | 0 | .714 | 6–2 | 8–3 | 313 | 140 | L1 |
| New England Patriots | 6 | 8 | 0 | .429 | 4–4 | 6–5 | 238 | 325 | W1 |
| New York Jets | 6 | 8 | 0 | .429 | 4–4 | 6–5 | 212 | 299 | W2 |
| Buffalo Bills | 1 | 13 | 0 | .071 | 1–7 | 1–10 | 184 | 394 | L3 |

Note: Tie games were not officially counted in the standings until 1972.

== Postseason ==
The team made it to the playoffs as a No. 4 seed and traveled to Cleveland to play the Cleveland Browns in the divisional round. The Colts led 14–0 at the half and would cruise to a 20–3 win. They then traveled south to play the Miami Dolphins and tried to make it to their second consecutive Super Bowl. Colts QB Johnny Unitas was intercepted three times as they were shut out 21–0.

| Round | Date | Opponent | Result | Record | Venue | Attendance |
|---|---|---|---|---|---|---|
| Divisional | December 26 | at Cleveland Browns | W 20–3 | 1–0 | Cleveland Municipal Stadium | 70,734 |
| AFC Championship | January 2, 1972 | at Miami Dolphins | L 0–21 | 1–1 | Miami Orange Bowl | 76,622 |

== See also ==
- History of the Indianapolis Colts
- Indianapolis Colts seasons
- Colts–Patriots rivalry
