= 1972 Baltimore Colts season =

20th season in franchise history; final one with Johnny Unitas

- Owner: Robert Irsay
- General manager: Joe Thomas
- Head coach: Don McCafferty (1–4); John Sandusky (4–5) (interim)
- Home stadium: Memorial Stadium

Results
- Record: 5–9
- Division place: 3rd AFC East
- Playoffs: Did not qualify
- Pro Bowlers: C Bill Curry; LB Ted Hendricks; KR Bruce Laird

The 1972 Baltimore Colts season was the 20th season for the team in the National Football League. They finished with 5 wins and 9 losses, third in the AFC East.

Robert Irsay, who had recently taken over the Los Angeles Rams, traded ownership of the NFL franchises with Colts' owner Carroll Rosenbloom, with players and coaching staffs remaining intact. Rosenbloom had previously wanted to move the Colts to Tampa, but was turned down by the league.

However, the Colts were getting older and started 1–4 before third-year head coach Don McCafferty was fired by new general manager Joe Thomas. In their final nine games under interim head coach John Sandusky, Baltimore won four to finish at 5–9, their first losing mark in sixteen seasons. The entire coaching staff was let go after the season concluded.

== Offseason ==
- July 13, 1972 — Robert Irsay bought the Los Angeles Rams and transferred ownership to Carroll Rosenbloom, in exchange for ownership of the Colts.

=== NFL draft ===
1972 Baltimore Colts draft
Round	Pick	Player	Position	College	Notes
1	22	Tom Drougas	Offensive tackle	Oregon	
2	46	Jack Mildren	Quarterback	Oklahoma	
2	47	Glenn Doughty	Wide receiver	Michigan	
2	48	Lydell Mitchell *	Running back	Penn State	
4	104	Eric Allen	Wide receiver	Michigan State	Played for the Toronto Argonauts from 1972 to 1975
5	115	Don Croft	Defensive tackle	UTEP	
6	152	Bruce Laird *	Safety	American International	
7	169	John Sykes	Running back	Morgan State	
8	191	Al Qualls	Linebacker	Oklahoma	
8	204	Van Brownson	Quarterback	Nebraska	
9	215	Gary Hambell	Defensive tackle	Dayton	
10	256	Dave Shilling	Running back	Oregon State	
11	282	Fred DeBernardi	Defensive end	UTEP	
12	308	Gary Theiler	Tight end	Tennessee	
13	334	Herb Washington	Wide receiver	Michigan State	
14	359	John Morris	Center	Missouri Valley	
15	386	Robin Parkhouse	Linebacker	Alabama	
16	412	Gary Wichard	Quarterback	C.W. Post	
17	438	Stan White	Linebacker	Ohio State	
Made roster * Made at least one Pro Bowl during career

== Personnel ==
=== Staff/coaches ===
1972 Baltimore Colts staff
Front office: Owner/president and treasurer – Robert Irsay; General manager – Don Klosterman; Coaching staff: Head coach – Don McCafferty (fired after 1–4 start); Interim Head Coach - John Sandusky (4-5); Offensive coaches: Receivers/offensive ends – Dick Bielski; Offensive coordinator – John Idzik; Offensive line coach – Red Miller	Defensive coaches: Defensive coordinator/defensive line – John Sandusky; Defensive backfield – Bobby Boyd; Linebackers coach – Hank Bullough

=== Roster ===
1972 Baltimore Colts roster
Quarterbacks (QB): 14 Marty Domres; 19 Johnny Unitas; Running backs (RB): 41 Tom Matte; 23 Don McCauley; 26 Lydell Mitchell; 48 Don Nottingham; 34 Tom Nowatzke; Wide receivers (WR): 30 Willie Franklin; 17 Sam Havrilak; 33 Eddie Hinton; 80 Jim O'Brien K; Tight ends (TE): 84 Tom Mitchell; 88 John Mosier	Offensive linemen (OL): 50 Bill Curry C; 74 Tom Drougas T; 61 Cornelius Johnson G; 57 Ken Mendenhall C; 62 Glenn Ressler G; 71 Dan Sullivan G; 72 Bob Vogel T; Defensive linemen (DL): 73 Richard Amman DE; 79 Jim Bailey DT; 85 Roy Hilton DE; 75 Chuck Hinton DT; 76 Fred Miller DT; 81 Billy Newsome DE	Linebackers (LB): 32 Mike Curtis MLB; 52 Randy Edmunds OLB; 83 Ted Hendricks OLB; 51 Bill Laskey OLB; 56 Ray May OLB; 54 Stan White MLB; Defensive backs (DB): 43 Lonnie Hepburn CB; 40 Bruce Laird CB; 20 Jerry Logan SS; 11 Jack Mildren FS; 31 Nelson Munsey CB; 47 Charlie Stukes CB; 21 Rick Volk FS; Special teams (ST): 49 David Lee P; 2 Boris Shlapak K	Reserve: 36 Norm Bulaich RB (IR); -- Fred DeBernardi DT (DNR); 35 Glenn Doughty WR (IR); 44 Rex Kern CB (IR); 68 Dennis Nelson T (IR); 78 Bubba Smith DE (IR); 28 Cotton Speyrer WR (IR); Rookies in italics

== Regular season ==
The season began ominously for the Colts when they were defeated at home on opening day by the St. Louis Cardinals and their journeyman quarterback, Tim Van Galder. In week two, Johnny Unitas threw for 376 yards and three touchdowns, but it was far from enough as Joe Namath threw for 496 yards and six touchdowns to power the New York Jets to a 44–34 victory at Memorial Stadium, the Jets' first victory over the Colts since Super Bowl III.

In October, the Colts' season reached its nadir when it was shut out twice at home in a three-week stretch by the Dallas Cowboys, who undoubtedly wanted revenge for their loss to Baltimore in Super Bowl V, and the Miami Dolphins, who were on their way to a 17–0 season and their first Super Bowl championship under former Colts coach Don Shula.

Unitas, age 39, made his final appearance in Baltimore in the fourth quarter of a 35–7 victory over Buffalo on December 3, and threw a 63-yard completion for his 287th career touchdown pass. Two weeks later, he played his final game as a Colt, with a completion and an interception.

For the third consecutive year, the Colts played their season finale at the Orange Bowl in Miami. Only this time, it was not in the postseason, but a humbling 16–0 shutout to the Dolphins in Week 14 in a game which was nowhere near as close as the final score. Baltimore ended the 1970 season with a win over the Cowboys in Super Bowl V, and ended the 1971 season with a loss to the Dolphins in the AFC Championship game.

=== Schedule ===
Week	Date	Opponent	Result	Record	Venue	Attendance	Recap
1	September 17	St. Louis Cardinals	**L** 3–10	0–1	Memorial Stadium	53,562	Recap
2	September 24	**New York Jets**	**L** 34–44	0–2	Memorial Stadium	56,626	Recap
3	October 1	at **Buffalo Bills**	**W** 17–0	1–2	War Memorial Stadium	46,206	Recap
4	October 8	San Diego Chargers	**L** 20–23	1–3	Memorial Stadium	55,459	Recap
5	October 15	Dallas Cowboys	**L** 0–21	1–4	Memorial Stadium	58,992	Recap
6	October 22	at **New York Jets**	**L** 20–24	1–5	Shea Stadium	62,948	Recap
7	October 29	**Miami Dolphins**	**L** 0–23	1–6	Memorial Stadium	60,000	Recap
8	November 6	at **New England Patriots**	**W** 24–17	2–6	Schaefer Stadium	60,999	Recap
9	November 12	at San Francisco 49ers	**L** 21–24	2–7	Candlestick Park	61,214	Recap
10	November 19	at Cincinnati Bengals	**W** 20–19	3–7	Riverfront Stadium	49,512	Recap
11	November 26	**New England Patriots**	**W** 31–0	4–7	Memorial Stadium	54,907	Recap
12	December 3	**Buffalo Bills**	**W** 35–7	5–7	Memorial Stadium	55,390	Recap
13	December 10	at Kansas City Chiefs	**L** 10–24	5–8	Arrowhead Stadium	44,175	Recap
14	December 16	at **Miami Dolphins**	**L** 0–16	5–9	Orange Bowl	80,010	Recap
Note: Intra-division opponents are in **bold** text.

=== Standings ===
AFC East
	W	L	T	PCT	DIV	CONF	PF	PA	STK
Miami Dolphins	14	0	0	1.000	8–0	11–0	385	171	W14
New York Jets	7	7	0	.500	6–2	6–5	367	324	L2
Baltimore Colts	5	9	0	.357	4–4	5–6	235	252	L2
Buffalo Bills	4	9	1	.321	2–6	2–9	257	377	W1
New England Patriots	3	11	0	.214	0–8	0–11	192	446	L1

== See also ==
- History of the Indianapolis Colts
- Indianapolis Colts seasons
- Colts–Patriots rivalry
