= 1970 Baltimore Colts season =

18th season in franchise history; first in the AFC East and first Super Bowl win

- Owner: Carroll Rosenbloom
- General manager: Don Klosterman
- Head coach: Don McCafferty
- Home stadium: Memorial Stadium

Results
- Record: 11–2–1
- Division place: 1st AFC East
- Playoffs: Won Divisional Playoffs (vs. Bengals) 17–0; Won AFC Championship (vs. Raiders) 27–17; Won Super Bowl V (vs. Cowboys) 16–13

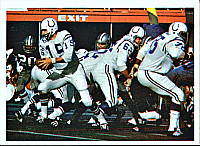
The Baltimore Colts playing against the Dallas Cowboys in Super Bowl V

The 1970 Baltimore Colts season was the 18th season of the second Colts franchise in the National Football League (NFL). Led by first-year head coach Don McCafferty, the Colts finished the 1970 season with a regular season record of 11 wins, 2 losses, and 1 tie to win the first AFC East title. The Colts completed the postseason in Miami with a victory over the Cowboys in Super Bowl V, their first Super Bowl title and fourth NFL championship (1958, 1959, 1968, and 1970).

== Season history ==
In February 1970, head coach Don Shula departed after seven seasons for the Miami Dolphins, now in the same division, and offensive backfield coach McCafferty was promoted in early April.

== Offseason ==
=== NFL draft ===
| Round | Pick | Player | Position | School/Club team |
|---|---|---|---|---|
| 1 | 18 | Norm Bulaich | Running Back | TCU |
| 2 | 44 | Jim Bailey | Defensive tackle | Kansas |
| 3 | 70 | Jim O'Brien | Wide Receiver / Kicker | Cincinnati |
| 3 | 74 | Ara Person | Tight End | Morgan State |
| 4 | 95 | Steve Smear | Linebacker | Penn State |
| 5 | 122 | Billy Newsome | Defensive End | Grambling State |
| 6 | 148 | Ron Gardin | Defensive Back | Arizona |
| 7 | 174 | Gordon Slade | Quarterback | Davidson |
| 8 | 199 | Bob Bouley | Tackle | Boston College |
| 9 | 226 | Barney Harris | Defensive Back | Texas A&M |

== Personnel ==
=== Staff/Coaches ===
1970 Baltimore Colts staff
| Front office: Owner/president and treasurer – Carroll Rosenbloom; General manager – Don Klosterman; Coaching staff: Head coach – Don McCafferty; Offensive coaches: Receivers/offensive ends – Dick Bielski; Offensive coordinator – John Idzik; Offensive line coach – Lou Rymkus | Defensive coaches: Defensive coordinator/defensive line – John Sandusky; Defensive backfield – Bobby Boyd; Linebackers coach – Hank Bullough |

=== Final roster ===
1970 Baltimore Colts roster
| Quarterbacks (QB): 15 Earl Morrall; 19 Johnny Unitas; Running backs (RB): 36 Norm Bulaich; 17 Sam Havrilak; 45 Jerry Hill; 40 Jack Maitland; 34 Tom Nowatzke; Wide receivers (WR): 33 Eddie Hinton; 87 Roy Jefferson; 28 Jimmy Orr; 27 Ray Perkins; Tight ends (TE): 88 John Mackey; 84 Tom Mitchell | Offensive linemen (OL): 73 Sam Ball T; 50 Bill Curry C; 54 Tom Goode C; 61 Cornelius Johnson G; 62 Glenn Ressler G; 71 Dan Sullivan T; 72 Bob Vogel T; 65 John Williams G; Defensive linemen (DL): 85 Roy Hilton DE; 76 Fred Miller DT; 81 Billy Newsome DE; 74 Billy Ray Smith DT; 78 Bubba Smith DE; 60 George Wright DT | Linebackers (LB): 32 Mike Curtis MLB; 51 Bob Grant OLB; 83 Ted Hendricks OLB; 56 Ray May OLB; 52 Robbie Nichols MLB; Defensive backs (DB): 35 Jim Duncan CB; 30 Ron Gardin CB; 20 Jerry Logan SS; 42 Tommy Maxwell CB; 47 Charlie Stukes CB; 21 Rick Volk FS; Special teams (ST): 49 David Lee P; 80 Jim O'Brien K | Taxi squad: 25 Tom Curtis S; 67 Lynn Larson T; 29 Paul Maliska WR; 55 Dale McCullers LB; 10 George Mira QB; 68 Dennis Nelson T; Reserve: 65 Jim Bailey DT (IR); 41 Tom Matte RB (IR); Rookies in italics |

== Preseason ==
| Week | Date | Opponent | Result | Record | Venue | Attendance | Recap |
|---|---|---|---|---|---|---|---|
| 1 | August 8 | at Oakland Raiders | W 33–21 | 1–0 | Oakland–Alameda County Coliseum | 53,519 | Recap |
| 2 | August 14 | at Kansas City Chiefs | W 17–3 | 2–0 | Municipal Stadium | 34,341 | Recap |
| 3 | August 22 | at Denver Broncos | W 24–7 | 3–0 | Mile High Stadium | 42,499 | Recap |
| 4 | August 29 | at Miami Dolphins | L 13–20 | 3–1 | Miami Orange Bowl | 73,533 | Recap |
| 5 | September 5 | vs. Detroit Lions | W 20–14 | 4–1 | Carter–Finley Stadium (Raleigh, NC) | 34,500 | Recap |
| 6 | September 12 | at Washington Redskins | L 14–17 | 4–2 | RFK Stadium | 46,045 | Recap |

== Regular season ==
=== Schedule ===
| Week | Date | Opponent | Result | Record | Venue | Attendance |
|---|---|---|---|---|---|---|
| 1 | September 20 | at San Diego Chargers | **W** 16–14 | 1–0 | San Diego Stadium | 47,782 |
| 2 | September 28 | Kansas City Chiefs | **L** 24–44 | 1–1 | Memorial Stadium | 53,911 |
| 3 | October 4 | at **Boston Patriots** | **W** 14–6 | 2–1 | Harvard Stadium | 38,235 |
| 4 | October 11 | at Houston Oilers | **W** 24–20 | 3–1 | Astrodome | 48,050 |
| 5 | October 18 | at **New York Jets** | **W** 29–22 | 4–1 | Shea Stadium | 63,301 |
| 6 | October 25 | **Boston Patriots** | **W** 27–3 | 5–1 | Memorial Stadium | 60,240 |
| 7 | November 1 | **Miami Dolphins** | **W** 35–0 | 6–1 | Memorial Stadium | 60,240 |
| 8 | November 9 | at Green Bay Packers | **W** 13–10 | 7–1 | Milwaukee County Stadium | 48,063 |
| 9 | November 15 | **Buffalo Bills** | **T** 17–17 | 7–1–1 | Memorial Stadium | 60,240 |
| 10 | November 22 | at **Miami Dolphins** | **L** 17–34 | 7–2–1 | Miami Orange Bowl | 67,699 |
| 11 | November 29 | Chicago Bears | **W** 21–20 | 8–2–1 | Memorial Stadium | 60,240 |
| 12 | December 6 | Philadelphia Eagles | **W** 29–10 | 9–2–1 | Memorial Stadium | 60,240 |
| 13 | December 13 | at **Buffalo Bills** | **W** 20–14 | 10–2–1 | War Memorial Stadium | 34,346 |
| 14 | December 19 | **New York Jets** | **W** 35–20 | 11–2–1 | Memorial Stadium | 60,240 |
Note: Intra-division opponents are in **bold** text.

=== Game summaries ===
==== Week 1 ====
| Team | 1 | 2 | 3 | 4 | Total |
|---|---|---|---|---|---|
| • **Colts** | 0 | 3 | 7 | 6 | 16 |
| Chargers | 0 | 0 | 7 | 7 | 14 |

- Date: September 20
- Location: San Diego Stadium, San Diego, California
- Game start: 1:00 p.m. PDT
- Game attendance: 47,782
- Game weather: 66 °F (19 °C) • Wind 8 mph (13 km/h)
- Referee: Jack Vest

Scoring summary
| 2 | BAL | Jim O'Brien 25-yard field goal | Colts 3–0 |
| 3 | SD | Gary Garrison 65-yard pass from John Hadl (Mike Mercer kick) | Chargers 7–3 |
| 3 | BAL | Norm Bulaich 1-yard run (Jim O'Brien kick) | Colts 10–7 |
| 4 | BAL | Jim O'Brien 34-yard field goal | Colts 13–7 |
| 4 | SD | Gary Garrison 43-yard pass from John Hadl (Mike Mercer kick) | Chargers 14–13 |
| 4 | BAL | Jim O'Brien 28-yard field goal | Colts 16–14 |

==== Week 2 ====
| Team | 1 | 2 | 3 | 4 | Total |
|---|---|---|---|---|---|
| • Chiefs | 10 | 21 | 3 | 10 | 44 |
| Colts | 0 | 7 | 3 | 14 | 24 |

- Date: September 28
- Location: Memorial Stadium, Baltimore
- Game start: 9:00 p.m. EDT
- Game attendance: 53,911
- Game weather: 61 °F (16 °C); wind 9 mph (14 km/h)
- Referee: Jim Tunney
- TV announcers (ABC): Keith Jackson, Don Meredith, and Howard Cosell

Scoring summary
| Q1 | KC | Richardson 48 yard pass from Dawson (Stenerud kick) | KC 7–0 |
| Q1 | KC | Stenerud 28 yard field goal | KC 10–0 |
| Q2 | KC | Holmes 13 yard pass from Dawson (Stenerud kick) | KC 17–0 |
| Q2 | KC | Robinson 46 yard fumble return (Stenerud kick) | KC 24–0 |
| Q2 | KC | Pitts 54 yard pass from Dawson (Stenerud kick) | KC 31–0 |
| Q2 | BAL | Jefferson 3 yard pass from Morall (O'Brien kick) | KC 31–7 |
| Q3 | BAL | O'Brien 26 yard field goal | KC 31–10 |
| Q3 | KC | Stenerud 17 yard field goal | KC 34–10 |
| Q4 | KC | Pitts 4 yard pass from Dawson (Stenerud kick) | KC 41–10 |
| Q4 | BAL | Hinton 21 yard pass from Morrall (O'Brien kick) | KC 41–17 |
| Q4 | BAL | Mitchell 2 yard pass from Morrall (O'Brien kick) | KC 41–24 |
| Q4 | KC | Stenerud 48 yard field goal | KC 44–24 |

==== Week 3 ====
| Team | 1 | 2 | 3 | 4 | Total |
|---|---|---|---|---|---|
| • Colts | 0 | 7 | 0 | 7 | 14 |
| Patriots | 0 | 3 | 0 | 3 | 6 |

- Date: October 4
- Location: Harvard Stadium, Boston
- Game start: 1:00 p.m. EDT
- Game attendance: 38,235
- Game weather: 59 °F (15 °C); wind 17 mph (27 km/h)
- Referee: Bernie Ulman

Scoring summary
| Q2 | BAL | Hinton 13 yard pass from Morrall (O'Brien kick) | BAL 7–0 |
| Q2 | BOS | Cappelletti 13 yard field goal | BAL 7–3 |
| Q4 | BOS | Cappelletti 25 yard field goal | BAL 7–6 |
| Q4 | BAL | Jefferson 55 yard pass from Unitas (O'Brien kick) | BAL 14–6 |

==== Week 4 ====
| Team | 1 | 2 | 3 | 4 | Total |
|---|---|---|---|---|---|
| • Colts | 7 | 10 | 0 | 7 | 24 |
| Oilers | 0 | 7 | 7 | 6 | 20 |

- Date: October 11
- Location: Houston Astrodome, Houston
- Game start: 3:00 p.m. CDT
- Game attendance: 48,050
- Game weather: Indoors (dome)
- Referee: George Rennix

Scoring summary
| Q1 | BAL | Maitland 2 yard run (O'Brien kick) | BAL 7–0 |
| Q2 | BAL | Jefferson 17 yard pass from Unitas (O'Brien kick) | BAL 14–0 |
| Q2 | HOU | LeVias 7 yard pass from Johnson (Gerela kick) | BAL 14–7 |
| Q2 | BAL | O'Brien 43 yard field goal | BAL 17–7 |
| Q3 | HOU | Hopkins 1 yard run (Gerela kick) | BAL 17–14 |
| Q4 | HOU | Gerela 27 yard field goal | Tie 17–17 |
| Q4 | HOU | Gerela 9 yard field goal | HOU 20–17 |
| Q4 | BAL | Jefferson 31 yard pass from Unitas (O'Brien kick) | BAL 24–20 |

==== Week 5 ====
| Team | 1 | 2 | 3 | 4 | Total |
|---|---|---|---|---|---|
| • Colts | 17 | 3 | 6 | 3 | 29 |
| Jets | 3 | 2 | 14 | 3 | 22 |

- Date: October 18
- Location: Shea Stadium, Flushing, New York
- Game start: 1:00 p.m. EDT
- Game attendance: 63,601
- Game weather: 51 °F (11 °C); wind 15 mph (24 km/h)
- Referee: Pat Haggerty

Scoring summary
| Q1 | BAL | O'Brien 28 yard field goal | BAL 3–0 |
| Q1 | BAL | Logan 31 yard interception return (O'Brien kick) | BAL 10–0 |
| Q1 | BAL | Mitchell 11 yard pass from Unitas (O'Brien kick) | BAL 17–0 |
| Q1 | NYJ | Turner 41 yard field goal | BAL 17–3 |
| Q2 | BAL | O'Brien 18 yard field goal | BAL 20–3 |
| Q2 | NYJ | Safety, Maitland tackled by Elliot in end zone | BAL 20–5 |
| Q3 | BAL | Grant 27 yard interception return (kick failed) | BAL 26–5 |
| Q3 | NYJ | Bell 17 yard pass from Namath (Turner kick) | BAL 26–12 |
| Q3 | NYJ | Boozer 1 yard run (Turner kick) | BAL 26–19 |
| Q4 | BAL | O'Brien 28 yard field goal | BAL 29–19 |
| Q4 | NYJ | Turner 42 yard field goal | BAL 29–22 |

This game was a repeat of the Super Bowl III matchup. The Colts established a 19–0 lead. For the Jets, Joe Namath recorded 392 passing yards and six interceptions. The Colts won the game.

==== Week 6 ====
| Team | 1 | 2 | 3 | 4 | Total |
|---|---|---|---|---|---|
| Patriots | 0 | 3 | 0 | 0 | 3 |
| • Colts | 3 | 14 | 3 | 7 | 27 |

- Date: October 25
- Location: Memorial Stadium, Baltimore
- Game start: 2:00 p.m. EST
- Game attendance: 60,240
- Game weather: 61 °F (16 °C); wind 6 mph (9.7 km/h)
- Referee: Bob Finley

Scoring summary
| Q1 | BAL | O'Brien 12 yard field goal | BAL 3–0 |
| Q2 | BOS | Gogolak 15 yard field goal | Tie 3–3 |
| Q2 | BAL | Maitland 5 yard pass from Unitas (O'Brien kick) | BAL 10–3 |
| Q2 | BAL | Jefferson 15 yard pass from Unitas (O'Brien kick) | BAL 17–3 |
| Q3 | BAL | O'Brien 48 yard field goal | BAL 20–3 |
| Q4 | BAL | Orr 26 yard pass from Unitas (O'Brien kick) | BAL 27–3 |

==== Week 7 ====
| Team | 1 | 2 | 3 | 4 | Total |
|---|---|---|---|---|---|
| Dolphins | 0 | 0 | 0 | 0 | 0 |
| • Colts | 7 | 7 | 14 | 7 | 35 |

- Date: November 1
- Location: Memorial Stadium, Baltimore
- Game start: 2:00 p.m. EST
- Game attendance: 60,240
- Game weather: 58 °F (14 °C); wind 8 mph (13 km/h)
- Referee: Norm Schachter
- TV announcers (NBC): Jim Simpson and Al DeRogatis

Scoring summary
| Q1 | BAL | Gardin 80 yard punt return (O'Brien kick) | BAL 7–0 |
| Q2 | BAL | Bulaich 1 yard run (O'Brien kick) | BAL 14–0 |
| Q3 | BAL | Duncan 99 yard kickoff return (O'Brien kick) | BAL 21–0 |
| Q3 | BAL | Hinton 32 yard pass from Unitas (O'Brien kick) | BAL 28–0 |
| Q4 | BAL | Mitchell 15 yard pass from Morrall (O'Brien kick) | BAL 35–0 |

==== Week 8 ====
| Team | 1 | 2 | 3 | 4 | Total |
|---|---|---|---|---|---|
| • Colts | 0 | 7 | 6 | 0 | 13 |
| Packers | 3 | 0 | 0 | 7 | 10 |

- Date: November 9
- Location: Milwaukee County Stadium, Milwaukee
- Game start: 8:00 p.m. CST
- Game attendance: 48,063
- Game weather: 50 °F (10 °C); wind 14 mph (23 km/h)
- Referee: Ben Dreith
- TV announcers (ABC): Keith Jackson, Don Meredith and Howard Cosell

Scoring summary
| Q1 | GB | Livingston 20 yard field goal | GB 3–0 |
| Q2 | BAL | Hill 15 yard run (O'Brien kick) | BAL 7–3 |
| Q3 | BAL | O'Brien 42 yard field goal | BAL 10–3 |
| Q3 | BAL | O'Brien 29 yard field goal | BAL 13–3 |
| Q4 | GB | Grabowski 1 yard run (Livingston kick) | BAL 13–10 |

==== Week 11 ====
| Team | 1 | 2 | 3 | 4 | Total |
|---|---|---|---|---|---|
| Bears | 17 | 0 | 0 | 3 | 20 |
| • Colts | 0 | 14 | 0 | 7 | 21 |

- Date: November 29
- Location: Memorial Stadium, Baltimore
- Game start: 2:00 p.m. EST
- Game attendance: 60,240
- Game weather: 71 °F (22 °C); wind 6 mph (9.7 km/h)
- Referee: Jack Vest

Scoring summary
| Q1 | CHI | Farmer 20 yard pass from Concannon (Percival kick) | CHI 7–0 |
| Q1 | CHI | Percival 28 yard field goal | CHI 10–0 |
| Q1 | CHI | Coady 1 yard pass from Concannon (Percival kick) | CHI 17–0 |
| Q2 | BAL | Hill 1 yard run (O'Brien kick) | CHI 17–7 |
| Q2 | BAL | Jefferson 7 yard pass from Unitas (O'Brien kick) | CHI 17–14 |
| Q4 | CHI | Percival 27 yard field goal | CHI 20–14 |
| Q4 | BAL | Mackey 54 yard pass from Unitas (O'Brien kick) | BAL 21–20 |

==== Week 12 ====
| Team | 1 | 2 | 3 | 4 | Total |
|---|---|---|---|---|---|
| Eagles | 0 | 3 | 7 | 0 | 10 |
| • Colts | 13 | 10 | 3 | 3 | 29 |

- Date: December 6
- Location: Memorial Stadium, Baltimore
- Game start: 2:00 p.m. EST
- Game attendance: 60,240
- Game weather: 38 °F (3 °C); wind 22 mph (35 km/h)
- Referee: Bernie Ulman
- TV announcers (CBS): Lindsey Nelson and Don Perkins

Scoring summary
| Q1 | BAL | Mackey 14 yard pass from Unitas (O'Brien kick) | BAL 7–0 |
| Q1 | BAL | Hinton 9 yard run (kick failed) | BAL 13–0 |
| Q2 | BAL | O'Brien 45 yard field goal | BAL 16–0 |
| Q2 | PHI | Moseley 38 yard field goal | BAL 16–3 |
| Q2 | BAL | Logan 33 yard interception return (O'Brien kick) | BAL 23–3 |
| Q3 | BAL | O'Brien 44 yard field goal | BAL 26–3 |
| Q3 | PHI | Snead 1 yard run (Moseley kick) | BAL 26–10 |
| Q4 | BAL | O'Brien 47 yard field goal | BAL 29–10 |

==== Week 13 ====
| Team | 1 | 2 | 3 | 4 | Total |
|---|---|---|---|---|---|
| • **Colts** | 10 | 0 | 7 | 3 | 20 |
| Bills | 7 | 7 | 0 | 0 | 14 |

- Date: December 13
- Location: War Memorial Stadium, Buffalo, New York
- Game start: 1:00 p.m. EST
- Game attendance: 34,346
- Game weather: Snow • 28 °F (−2 °C) • Wind 11 mph (18 km/h)
- Referee: Bob Finley

Scoring summary
| 1 | BAL | Jim O'Brien 32-yard field goal | Colts 3–0 |
| 1 | BUF | Lloyd Pate 1-yard run (Grant Guthrie kick) | Bills 7–3 |
| 1 | BAL | Tom Nowatzke 1-yard run (Jim O'Brien kick) | Colts 10–7 |
| 2 | BUF | Marlin Briscoe 10-yard pass from Dennis Shaw (Grant Guthrie kick) | Bills 14–10 |
| 3 | BAL | Norm Bulaich 2-yard run (Jim O'Brien kick) | Colts 17–14 |
| 4 | BAL | Jim O'Brien 38-yard field goal | Colts 20–14 |

The Colts clinched the division title with the win.

==== Week 14 ====
| Team | 1 | 2 | 3 | 4 | Total |
|---|---|---|---|---|---|
| Jets | 7 | 7 | 3 | 3 | 20 |
| • Colts | 0 | 14 | 7 | 14 | 35 |

- Date: December 19
- Location: Memorial Stadium, Baltimore
- Game start: 3:00 p.m. EST
- Game attendance: 60,240
- Game weather: 49 °F (9 °C); wind 5 mph (8.0 km/h)
- Referee: Tommy Bell
- TV announcers (NBC): Curt Gowdy and Kyle Rote

Scoring summary
| Q1 | NYJ | Caster 15 yard pass from Woodall (Turner kick) | NYJ 7–0 |
| Q2 | BAL | Hinton 25 yard pass from Morrall (O'Brien kick) | Tie 7–7 |
| Q2 | NYJ | Grantham 41 yard interception return (Turner kick) | NYJ 14–7 |
| Q2 | BAL | Hinton 7 yard pass from Morrall (O'Brien kick) | Tie 14–14 |
| Q3 | BAL | Orr 18 yard pass from Morrall (O'Brien kick) | BAL 21–14 |
| Q3 | NYJ | Turner 25 yard field goal | BAL 21–17 |
| Q4 | NYJ | Turner 29 yard field goal | BAL 21–20 |
| Q4 | BAL | Perkins 41 yard pass from Morrall (O'Brien kick) | BAL 28–20 |
| Q4 | BAL | Hendricks recovered fumble in end zone (O'Brien kick) | BAL 35–20 |

- Earl Morrall 18/33, 348 Yds

=== Standings ===
AFC East
| | W | L | T | PCT | DIV | CONF | PF | PA | STK |
|---|---|---|---|---|---|---|---|---|---|
| Baltimore Colts | 11 | 2 | 1 | .846 | 6–1–1 | 8–2–1 | 321 | 234 | W4 |
| Miami Dolphins | 10 | 4 | 0 | .714 | 6–2 | 8–3 | 297 | 228 | W6 |
| New York Jets | 4 | 10 | 0 | .286 | 2–6 | 2–9 | 255 | 286 | L3 |
| Buffalo Bills | 3 | 10 | 1 | .231 | 3–4–1 | 3–7–1 | 204 | 337 | L5 |
| Boston Patriots | 2 | 12 | 0 | .143 | 2–6 | 2–9 | 149 | 361 | L3 |

Note: Tie games were not officially counted in the standings until 1972.

== Postseason ==
The team made it to the playoffs with the best record in the AFC. The Colts hosted both AFC playoff games that they played in. (It wasn't until the 1975 season that playoff teams were seeded by record; the fact that the Colts hosted both playoff games was just due to the rotation set up with the AFL–NFL merger.) The team won both AFC playoff games as well as Super Bowl V.

| Round | Date | Opponent | Result | Record | Venue | Attendance |
|---|---|---|---|---|---|---|
| Divisional | December 26 | Cincinnati Bengals | W 17–0 | 1–0 | Memorial Stadium | 51,127 |
| AFC Championship | January 3, 1971 | Oakland Raiders | W 27–17 | 2–0 | Memorial Stadium | 56,368 |
| Super Bowl V | January 17, 1971 | Dallas Cowboys | W 16–13 | 3–0 | Miami Orange Bowl | 80,055 |

=== Divisional ===
| Team | 1 | 2 | 3 | 4 | Total |
|---|---|---|---|---|---|
| Bengals | 0 | 0 | 0 | 0 | 0 |
| • Colts | 7 | 3 | 0 | 7 | 17 |

- Date: December 26
- Location: Memorial Stadium, Baltimore
- Game start: 1:30 p.m. EST
- Game weather: 30 °F (−1 °C); wind 15 mph (24 km/h)
- Referee: Jack Vest
- TV announcers (NBC): Jim Simpson and Al DeRogatis

Scoring summary
| Q1 | BAL | Jefferson 45 yard pass from Unitas (O'Brien kick) | BAL 7–0 |
| Q2 | BAL | O'Brien 44 yard field goal | BAL 10–0 |
| Q4 | BAL | Hinton 53 yard pass from Unitas (O'Brien kick) | BAL 17–0 |

The Colts hosted the Cincinnati Bengals in the divisional round. The Colts relied on their defense, which had carried them all season, to best the Bengals 17–0, holding Cincinnati to only 139 total yards.

=== Conference Championship ===
| Team | 1 | 2 | 3 | 4 | Total |
|---|---|---|---|---|---|
| Raiders | 0 | 3 | 7 | 7 | 17 |
| • Colts | 3 | 7 | 10 | 7 | 27 |

- Date: January 3
- Location: Memorial Stadium, Baltimore
- Game start: 2:00 p.m. EST
- Game weather: 34 °F (1 °C); wind 6 mph (9.7 km/h)
- Referee: Ben Dreith
- TV announcers (NBC): Curt Gowdy and Kyle Rote

Scoring summary
| Q1 | BAL | O'Brien 16 yard field goal | BAL 3–0 |
| Q2 | BAL | Bulaich 2 yard run (O'Brien kick) | BAL 10–0 |
| Q2 | OAK | Blanda 48 yard field goal | BAL 10–3 |
| Q3 | OAK | Biletnikoff 38 yard pass from Blanda (Blanda kick) | Tie 10–10 |
| Q3 | BAL | O'Brien 23 yard field goal | BAL 13–10 |
| Q3 | BAL | Bulaich 11 yard run (O'Brien kick) | BAL 20–10 |
| Q4 | OAK | Wells 15 yard pass from Blanda (Blanda kick) | BAL 20–17 |
| Q4 | BAL | Perkins 68 yard pass from Unitas (O'Brien kick) | BAL 27–17 |

The Colts next hosted the Oakland Raiders for the AFC Championship Game. The Colts jumped out to an early lead over the Raiders, 10–3 at halftime. Oakland came back to tie it up early in the 3rd quarter. The Colts would respond with a Jim O'Brien field goal and a second Bulaich touchdown. Johnny Unitas extended the lead with a 68-yard touchdown pass to Ray Perkins that made the score 27–17. The Colts would seal the win with an interception in the end zone.

=== Super Bowl ===
| Team | 1 | 2 | 3 | 4 | Total |
|---|---|---|---|---|---|
| • Colts | 0 | 6 | 0 | 10 | 16 |
| Cowboys | 3 | 10 | 0 | 0 | 13 |

- Date: January 17
- Location: Miami Orange Bowl, Miami
- Game start: 1:50 p.m. EST
- Game weather: 59 °F (15 °C); wind 11 mph (18 km/h)
- Referee: Norm Schachter
- TV announcers (NBC): Curt Gowdy, Kyle Rote, and Bill Enis

Scoring summary
| Q1 | DAL | Clark 14 yard field goal | DAL 3–0 |
| Q2 | DAL | Clark 30 yard field goal | DAL 6–0 |
| Q2 | BAL | Mackey 75 yard pass from Unitas (kick failed) | Tie 6–6 |
| Q2 | DAL | Thomas 7 yard pass from Morton (Clark kick) | DAL 13–6 |
| Q4 | BAL | Nowatzke 2 yard run (O'Brien kick) | Tie 13–13 |
| Q4 | BAL | O'Brien 32 yard field goal | BAL 16–13 |

The Colts made it to the Super Bowl for the second time in franchise history and played the Dallas Cowboys for the NFL championship. In the 2nd quarter, Johnny Unitas threw a pass that was tipped twice before John Mackey caught it for a 75-yard score. Later in the quarter Unitas was injured and Earl Morrall completed a sloppy and turnover-filled game: the Colts committed a total of 7 turnovers, the Cowboys 4. Following an interception by Mike Curtis, Jim O'Brien kicked the game-winning 32-yard field goal, giving Baltimore a 16–13 lead with 5 seconds left in the game, and the victory.

== See also ==
- History of the Indianapolis Colts
- Indianapolis Colts seasons
- Colts–Patriots rivalry
