= List of Morgan State Bears in the NFL draft =

This is a list of Morgan State Bears football players in the NFL draft.

== Key ==
| B | Back | K | Kicker | NT | Nose tackle |
| C | Center | LB | Linebacker | FB | Fullback |
| DB | Defensive back | P | Punter | HB | Halfback |
| DE | Defensive end | QB | Quarterback | WR | Wide receiver |
| DT | Defensive tackle | RB | Running back | G | Guard |
| E | End | T | Offensive tackle | TE | Tight end |

== Selections ==
| Year | Round | Pick | Overall | Player | Team | Position |
|---|---|---|---|---|---|---|
| 1951 | 11 | 2 | 125 | George Rooks | Green Bay Packers | B |
| 1953 | 27 | 8 | 321 | Roosevelt Brown | New York Giants | T |
| 1954 | 22 | 2 | 255 | Willie Buford | Green Bay Packers | T |
| 1959 | 28 | 10 | 334 | Dolphus Williams | New York Giants | T |
| 1964 | 8 | 12 | 110 | Leroy Kelly | Cleveland Browns | RB |
| 1964 | 18 | 9 | 247 | Oliver Dobbins | Pittsburgh Steelers | B |
| 1966 | 19 | 15 | 290 | Ken Duke | Baltimore Colts | RB |
| 1966 | 20 | 15 | 305 | Tom Carr | Baltimore Colts | T |
| 1967 | 2 | 24 | 50 | Willie Lanier | Kansas City Chiefs | LB |
| 1967 | 11 | 10 | 273 | Earl Mayo | Chicago Bears | RB |
| 1967 | 15 | 18 | 385 | John Wade | Baltimore Colts | DB |
| 1968 | 2 | 2 | 29 | Carlton Dabney | Atlanta Falcons | DE |
| 1968 | 8 | 5 | 197 | Daryl Johnson | Boston Patriots | DB |
| 1968 | 10 | 21 | 267 | Alvin Mitchell | Cleveland Browns | WR |
| 1968 | 12 | 17 | 317 | Jeff Queen | San Diego Chargers | LB |
| 1968 | 15 | 1 | 382 | Harvey Palmore | Cincinnati Bengals | G |
| 1969 | 4 | 10 | 88 | Edward Hayes | Denver Broncos | DB |
| 1969 | 11 | 13 | 273 | John Fuqua | New York Giants | RB |
| 1969 | 16 | 26 | 416 | George Nock | New York Jets | RB |
| 1970 | 1 | 24 | 24 | Raymond Chester | Oakland Raiders | TE |
| 1970 | 3 | 22 | 74 | Ara Person | Baltimore Colts | TE |
| 1970 | 13 | 23 | 335 | Mark Washington | Dallas Cowboys | DB |
| 1971 | 7 | 10 | 166 | Willie Germany | Washington Redskins | DB |
| 1971 | 7 | 18 | 174 | Larry Watson | Houston Oilers | T |
| 1972 | 7 | 13 | 169 | John Sykes | Baltimore Colts | RB |
| 1972 | 10 | 1 | 235 | Maurice Tyler | Buffalo Bills | DB |
| 1973 | 6 | 1 | 131 | Ron Mayo | Houston Oilers | TE |
| 1973 | 7 | 19 | 175 | John Andrews | Detroit Lions | DT |
| 1974 | 8 | 6 | 188 | Greg Latta | Baltimore Colts | TE |
| 1975 | 14 | 26 | 364 | Mike Collier | Pittsburgh Steelers | RB |
| 1976 | 10 | 18 | 283 | Tim Baylor | Baltimore Colts | DB |
| 1980 | 5 | 6 | 116 | Elvis Franks | Cleveland Browns | DE |
| 1981 | 3 | 23 | 79 | Michael Holston | Houston Oilers | WR |
| 1982 | 11 | 14 | 293 | Mikal Abdul-Saboor | Pittsburgh Steelers | G |
| 2003 | 3 | 27 | 91 | Visanthe Shiancoe | New York Giants | TE |
| 2019 | 7 | 34 | 248 | Joshua Miles | Arizona Cardinals | T |
