= Don McCafferty =

American football player and coach (1921–1974)

- McCafferty in 1970

No. 87
- Position: End

Personal information
- Born: March 12, 1921; Cleveland, Ohio, U.S.
- Died: July 28, 1974 (aged 53); Bloomfield Hills, Michigan, U.S.
- Listed height: 6 ft 4 in (1.93 m)
- Listed weight: 220 lb (100 kg)

Career information
- High school: Rhodes (Cleveland)
- College: Ohio State
- NFL draft: 1943: 13th round, 116th overall pick

Career history

Playing
- New York Giants (1946); Jersey City Giants (1947)

Coaching
- Kent State (1948–1958) Assistant coach; Baltimore Colts (1959–1962) Assistant coach; Baltimore Colts (1963–1969) Offensive coordinator; Baltimore Colts (1970–1972) Head coach; Detroit Lions (1973) Head coach

Awards and highlights
- Super Bowl champion (V); 2× NFL champion (1959, 1968); National champion (1942); Second-team All-American (1942)

Career NFL statistics
- Receptions: 3
- Receiving yards: 38
- Receiving touchdowns: 1
- Stats at Pro Football Reference

Head coaching record
- Regular season: 28–17–2 (.617)
- Postseason: 4–1 (.800)
- Career: 32–18–2 (.635)
- Coaching profile at Pro Football Reference

Donald William McCafferty (March 12, 1921 – July 28, 1974) was an American football player and coach in the National Football League (NFL). In his first year as head coach of the Baltimore Colts, McCafferty led the team to a victory in Super Bowl V, becoming the first rookie head coach to win a Super Bowl. McCafferty played college football at Ohio State.

== College career ==
McCafferty played college football for Ohio State University under coach Paul Brown, where he was a key member of the offensive line. Due to World War II, he was one of a select group of players to play twice in the annual College All-Star Game held in Chicago.

McCafferty joined the U.S. Army in 1943, cutting short his college football career. While stationed at Fort Bragg in North Carolina, McCafferty played on the station's football team.

== Professional career ==
Despite being in the military, McCafferty was drafted 116th overall by the New York Giants in the 13th round of the 1943 NFL draft. He joined the Giants in 1946 at the conclusion of his military service and was shifted from tackle to wide receiver, then known as an end. In his one season with the Giants, McCafferty made three receptions for 38 yards and one touchdown.

McCafferty re-signed with the Giants prior to the 1947 NFL season but was sent to their minor league team, the Jersey City Giants, of the American Football League. He played with Jersey City for one year.

== Coaching career ==
After working in the Cleveland, Ohio, recreation department the following year, McCafferty was hired as an assistant coach at Kent State University in 1948. He spent eleven seasons with the Golden Flashes until accepting an assistant coaching position with the Baltimore Colts in 1959 under head coach Weeb Ewbank. During his first season at the professional level, McCafferty was a member of the Colts' 1959 NFL championship team, their second straight championship.

Ewbank was fired after the 1962 season and McCafferty remained with the team as offensive backs coach under new head coach Don Shula. McCafferty's easy-going personality helped serve as a buffer against the demanding Shula's quest for perfection, a contrast that played a major part in the team's three NFL playoff appearances during the next seven years. Colts' Hall of Fame quarterback Johnny Unitas once said about McCafferty, "He doesn't shout and scream. He's able to look at football objectively without getting carried away emotionally." He was referred to in the press and by the Colts players as "Easy Rider."

When Shula left after seven seasons in February 1970 for the Miami Dolphins, McCafferty was promoted to head coach on April 6, 1970. In his first season as head coach, McCafferty led the Colts to an 11–2–1 record and their second Super Bowl appearance in three years. In the turnover-filled Super Bowl V against the Dallas Cowboys, the Colts won 16–13 on a last-second field goal by rookie Jim O'Brien.

The Colts once again reached the playoffs in 1971, but were shut out 21–0 in the AFC Championship Game by Shula's Dolphins in the Orange Bowl. Ownership changed in 1972, and after only one win in the team's first five games, the last a 21–0 home shutout loss to Dallas, general manager Joe Thomas ordered the 39-year-old Unitas benched as the team's quarterback; when McCafferty refused, he was fired. It was the fastest a Super Bowl coach has ever been fired and he was the only person to win a Super Bowl and be fired within six years until 2021.

McCafferty signed a three-year contract as head coach of the Detroit Lions three months later on January 26, 1973. He succeeded Joe Schmidt who had resigned two weeks prior. The Lions finished 6–7–1 in McCafferty's only season in 1973.

== Death ==
On July 28, 1974, while spending some time at his home in West Bloomfield, Michigan, McCafferty suffered a heart attack while mowing his lawn. After being transported to a Pontiac hospital, he died at age 53. He was succeeded by Rick Forzano. He was buried three days later, following services at Dulaney Valley Memorial Gardens in Timonium, Maryland.

== Head coaching record ==
Team	Year	Regular season					Postseason			
Team	Year	Won	Lost	Ties	Win %	Finish	Won	Lost	Win %	Result
BAL	1970	11	2	1	.821	1st in AFC East	3	0	1.000	Super Bowl V champions
BAL	1971	10	4	0	.714	2nd in AFC East	1	1	1.000	Lost to the Miami Dolphins in AFC Championship
BAL	1972	1	4	0	.200	3rd in AFC East	–	–	–	(Fired)
BAL Total		22	10	1	.682		4	1	.800	
DET	1973	6	7	1	.464	2nd in NFC Central	–	–	–	
DET Total		6	7	1	.464		–	–	–	
Total		28	17	2	.617		4	1	.800	
