= Jim O'Brien (American football) =

American football player (born 1947)

- O'Brien in college

No. 80, 45
- Position: Placekicker / Wide receiver

Personal information
- Born: February 2, 1947 (age 79); El Paso, Texas, U.S.
- Listed height: 6 ft 0 in (1.83 m)
- Listed weight: 195 lb (88 kg)

Career information
- High school: Aiken (Cincinnati, Ohio)
- College: Cincinnati (1967–1969)
- NFL draft: 1970: 3rd round, 70th overall pick

Career history
- Baltimore Colts (1970–1972); Detroit Lions (1973); New York Giants (1975)*
- * Offseason or practice squad member only

Awards and highlights
- Super Bowl champion (V)

Career NFL statistics
- Field goal attempts: 108
- Field goals made: 60
- Receptions: 14
- Receiving yards: 305
- Games played: 52
- Stats at Pro Football Reference

James Eugene O'Brien (born February 2, 1947) is an American former professional football player who was a placekicker and wide receiver in the National Football League (NFL). O'Brien played for the Baltimore Colts from 1970 to 1972 and the Detroit Lions in 1973. O'Brien is best remembered for kicking the game-winning field goal in the final seconds of Super Bowl V, making him the first of only three placekickers to accomplish such a feat.

== Early life ==
Jim O'Brien was born on February 2, 1947 in El Paso, Texas. He later moved to Cincinnati, Ohio, where he graduated from Aiken High School.

== College career ==
O'Brien enrolled at the United States Air Force Academy in 1966, but received a medical discharge for ulcers.

O'Brien then attended the University of Cincinnati, originally on a basketball scholarship. On the Cincinnati football team, he split duties between placekicker and wide receiver. In 1968, O'Brien led the nation in scoring with 142 points, with 44 receptions for 1,107 yards and 12 touchdowns as a receiver and making 13 field goals and 31 PATs as a placekicker. During his senior season in 1969, O'Brien set an NCAA Division I record by averaging 21.9 yards per catch.

He was invited to the North–South Shrine Game and the Coaches All-America Game during his college career.

== Professional career ==
=== Baltimore Colts (1970–1972) ===
O'Brien was selected by the Baltimore Colts in the third round of the 1970 NFL draft.

==== 1970 season ====
In his rookie year, O'Brien made 36 of 38 PATs and 19 of 34 field goals, with a long of 48 yards. He also recorded one reception for 28 yards in the final regular season game against the New York Jets. The Colts ended the 1970 regular season with an 11–2–1 record and defeated the Cincinnati Bengals and Oakland Raiders in the playoffs to earn a spot in the Super Bowl. Defensive stars and team leaders Bubba Smith and Mike Curtis nicknamed O'Brien "the hippie" because of his long hair and mustache, though Curtis noted O'Brien was not actually a hippie in any way besides his looks.

===== Super Bowl V =====
In Super Bowl V, the Colts faced the Dallas Cowboys in Miami, Florida. The Cowboys took an early lead on two field goals by Mike Clark before Colts quarterback Johnny Unitas completed a tipped pass to tight end John Mackey for a 75-yard touchdown. O'Brien's subsequent PAT attempt was blocked, leaving the game tied at 6–6. Later in the second quarter, the Cowboys scored a touchdown on a Craig Morton throw to Duane Thomas to take a 13–6 lead. Unitas was also knocked out of the game and replaced by Earl Morrall. In the third quarter, O'Brien missed a 52-yard field goal that fell short of the goal post. The game's next score did not occur until the fourth quarter. Morton was intercepted by Colts safety Rick Volk who returned the ball to the Cowboys' 3-yard line. Colts running back Tom Nowatzke scored two plays later, capped by an O'Brien PAT to tie the game again at 13–13.

With the game still tied late in the fourth quarter, the Cowboys had possession with a chance to win. An offensive holding penalty followed by a Morton interception to linebacker Mike Curtis gave the Colts the ball back on the Cowboys' 28-yard line. The Colts ran two plays on offense before bringing in O'Brien on third down to kick a 32-yard field goal with nine seconds remaining.

O'Brien later claimed that he was concentrating so hard that he "remember(ed) everything but not much." O'Brien made the kick, and the Colts took a 16–13 lead with five seconds remaining in the game. O'Brien performed a squib kick on the ensuing kickoff, leaving one second remaining on the clock. Morton threw an interception to Colts safety Jerry Logan on the final play, sealing the Colts victory. After the game, Bill Curry told Curtis and the other defenders that their previous plan to shave O'Brien's head should be called off because of his clutch effort, and Curtis told a very relieved O'Brien he had saved his long locks while congratulating him.

O'Brien's game-winning field goal in the final seconds was the first in Super Bowl history. This feat has since been accomplished three more times, twice by Adam Vinatieri with the New England Patriots and once by Harrison Butker with the Kansas City Chiefs.

==== 1971 season ====
In the 1971 season, O'Brien made 35 of 36 PATs and 20 of 29 field goals, with a long of 50 yards made against the New England Patriots in week three. In that same game, O'Brien had three made field goals of over 40 yards and two PATs. The Colts went 10–4 before losing in the 1971 AFC Championship Game to the Miami Dolphins where O'Brien missed two field goals.

==== 1972 season ====
In 1972, O'Brien's field goal percentage dropped to a career-low 41.9%, having made only 13 of 31 attempts with a long of 42 yards. He did not miss a PAT during the season, going 24 for 24. However, on offense he had his best season at wide receiver. O'Brien had 11 receptions for 263 yards and two touchdowns during the season. He also had three rushing attempts for nine yards. His first career touchdown reception came against the New York Jets in week six on a 13-yard pass from quarterback Marty Domres. The Colts went 5–9 on the season and did not make the playoffs.

In July 1972, O'Brien was traded to the Detroit Lions in exchange for a draft pick. Citing his declining field goal accuracy, Colts head coach Howard Schnellenberger and general manager Joe Thomas asked O'Brien to remain on the team as a wide receiver. O'Brien disagreed and was traded.

=== Detroit Lions (1973) ===
O'Brien spent one season in Detroit. He made eight of 14 field goals with a long of 39 yards. He went 14 for 14 on PATs. On offense, he had two receptions for 14 yards. O'Brien was released by the Lions in the final round of cuts before the start of the 1974 season.

=== New York Giants (1975) ===
After one year out of the NFL due to an off-the-field eye injury, O'Brien was signed by the New York Giants in May 1975. O'Brien spent the offseason competing for the kicking position before he was cut in September 1975 prior to the start of the regular season.

== Professional career statistics ==
Legend
	Won the Super Bowl
**Bold**	Career high

=== Regular season ===
Year	Team	GP	Field goals				PATs			Receiving				
Year	Team	GP	FGM	FGA	Pct	Lng	XPM	XPA	Pct	Rec	Yds	Avg	Lng	TD
1970	BAL	14	19	**34**	55.9	48	**36**	**38**	94.7	1	28	**28.0**	28	0
1971	BAL	14	**20**	29	**69.0**	**50**	35	36	97.2	0	0	0.0	0	0
1972	BAL	14	13	31	41.9	42	24	24	**100**	**11**	**263**	23.9	**44**	**2**
1973	DET	10	8	14	57.1	39	14	14	**100**	2	14	7.0	9	0
Career		52	60	108	55.6	50	109	112	97.3	14	305	21.8	44	2

=== Postseason ===
Year	Team	GP	Field goals			PATs		
Year	Team	GP	FGM	FGA	Pct	XPM	XPA	Pct
1970	BAL	3	4	9	44.4	6	7	85.7
1971	BAL	2	2	5	40.0	2	2	100
Career		5	6	14	42.9	8	9	88.9

== Personal life ==
After retiring from the NFL, O'Brien moved to Southern California where he became a construction manager.

== See also ==
- List of NCAA major college football yearly scoring leaders
