= Norm Bulaich =

American football player (born 1946)

No. 36, 31
- Positions: Fullback, Running back

Personal information
- Born: December 25, 1946 (age 79); Galveston, Texas, U.S.
- Listed height: 6 ft 1 in (1.85 m)
- Listed weight: 218 lb (99 kg)

Career information
- High school: La Marque (La Marque, Texas)
- College: TCU (1966-1969)
- NFL draft: 1970: 1st round, 18th overall pick

Career history
- Baltimore Colts (1970–1972); Philadelphia Eagles (1973–1974); Miami Dolphins (1975–1979)

Awards and highlights
- Super Bowl champion (V); Pro Bowl (1971); Second-team All-SWC (1969)

Career NFL statistics
- Rushing yards: 3,362
- Rushing average: 4.1
- Receptions: 224
- Receiving yards: 1,766
- Total touchdowns: 41
- Stats at Pro Football Reference

Norman Batton Bulaich (/ˈbuːlɑːʃ/ BOO-lahsh; born December 25, 1946) is an American former professional football player who was a running back in the National Football League (NFL).

== Early life ==
Bulaich was born on Christmas Day, 1946, in Galveston, Texas. He attended La Marque High School in La Marque, Texas, in Galveston County.

As a high school senior, he was voted team captain of the football team. He was a Scholastic Magazine All-American, and was All-State and All District. The team went to the state semifinals. As a senior, he rushed for 1,349 yards, averaging 9.1 yards per carry. In 1965, he played in an interstate all-star game (the Big 33 Football Classic) between Pennsylvania and Texas high schoolers, where he was one of 11 High School All-Americans to participate. His number 23 jersey was retired and placed in the school's trophy case. He was known for sprinter's speed and long touchdown runs, but Bulaich was also the team's kicker, punter, and a safety on defense.

== College career ==
Bulaich played college football at Texas Christian University (TCU), where he was an honorable mention All-American in 1969. He played in 30 games for TCU, rushing for 1,045 yards on 214 carries. He was selected as a member of the Texas Gridiron Legends class of 2018.

== Professional career ==
After playing college football at Texas Christian University, Bulaich was selected in the first round (18th overall) in the 1970 NFL draft by the Baltimore Colts, for whom he wore number 36.

In his rookie season, Bulaich started all 12 games, and rushed for 426 yards in 139 attempts. He was a member of the winning Colts team in Super Bowl V, carrying the ball 18 times. He carried the ball twice near the end of the game to set up the final winning field goal. In his second year with the Colts, Bulaich rushed for 741 yards on 152 attempts, to go along with 25 pass receptions for 229 yards, and 10 touchdowns.

The 6 ft 1 in (1.85 m), 217 pound (98.4 kg) running back/fullback held the Colts single-game rushing record, 198 yards against the New York Jets on September 19, 1971, until the 2000 season when Edgerrin James broke the record by rushing for 219 yards. Later in that 1971 season, Bulaich was named to the AFC Pro Bowl squad. He was also featured on the cover of the November 8, 1971 issue of Sports Illustrated.

He was traded from the Colts to the Philadelphia Eagles for a 1973 fourth-round selection (83rd overall–Kansas lineman Gery Palmer) and a 1974 second-round pick (37th overall–Ed Shuttlesworth) on January 29, 1973. Two years later he was traded to the Miami Dolphins, a team coached by future hall of fame and all-time winning head coach Don Shula. Shula had been the Colts head coach when the Colts drafted Bulaich, who had been scouted by Upton Bell for the Colts.

In 120 career games with the Colts (1970–72), Eagles (1973–74) and Miami Dolphins (1975–79), Bulaich rushed for 3,362 yards and 30 touchdowns with a 4.1 rushing average. He also made 224 receptions for 1,766 yards and 11 touchdowns.

== Bulaich and concussions ==
In 1974, Bulaich had been knocked unconscious when the Eagles played the St. Louis Cardinals in the first game of the season (September 15, 1974), suffering a concussion. Bulaich suffered a temporary memory loss that day, and during the next two games he had a similar experience on hits that were not as hard. Bulaich's style of running resulted in so many "dings", that an Eagles teammate called him "Paper Head". Bulaich came out of games over the years with concussion symptoms ("stars shooting out"), but had continued playing.

The Eagles sent Bulaich to Duke University Hospital, where the doctor recommended rest so the injury could heal, comparing it to a bruise. On October 6, 1974, Bulaich was cleared to play. The team's athletic trainer, Otho Davis, who had also come from the Colts to the Eagles in 1973, created a helmet pad for Bulaich, putting extra padding on the ridge on the outside of the helmet's rear. Between the concussions and other physical issues, Bulaich's yardage fell by nearly 2/3 between 1973 and 1974, and he was traded at the end of the year.

In August 1979, Shula was successful in convincing Bulaich to come out of retirement to play for the Dolphins as Larry Csonka's backup. Bulaich ultimately retired from the Dolphins later in 1979, after a play in which his face was crushed in an on-field collision with opposing players, resulting in broken facial bones and being unconscious for five minutes. He underwent a three-hour surgery for the facial damage, and decided to end his career.

Bulaich had brain scans in 2011 and 2012 that may have shown damage from the concussions, but was unsure at the time if forgetfulness he experienced was normal aging or the result of concussions. Bulaich was one of the many former NFL players who were plaintiffs in lawsuits against the league for brain injuries.

== Later life ==
Bulaich lives in Hurst, Texas, and worked as an executive for IESI-BFC Ltd., a waste management company, in Haltom City, Texas.

== NFL career statistics ==
Legend
**Bold**	Career high

=== Regular season ===
Year	Team	Games		Rushing					Receiving				
Year	Team	GP	GS	Att	Yds	Avg	Lng	TD	Rec	Yds	Avg	Lng	TD
1970	BAL	12	12	139	426	3.1	15	3	11	123	**11.2**	20	0
1971	BAL	13	12	**152**	**741**	**4.9**	**67**	**8**	25	229	9.2	30	2
1972	BAL	6	2	27	109	4.0	18	1	9	55	6.1	10	0
1973	PHI	14	**14**	106	436	4.1	20	1	**42**	**403**	9.6	**80**	3
1974	PHI	11	8	50	152	3.0	13	0	28	204	7.3	26	0
1975	MIA	14	1	78	309	4.0	30	5	32	276	8.6	59	**5**
1976	MIA	11	7	122	540	4.4	35	4	28	151	5.4	25	0
1977	MIA	14	7	91	416	4.6	29	4	25	180	7.2	14	0
1978	MIA	**16**	3	40	196	**4.9**	63	2	16	92	5.8	22	0
1979	MIA	9	0	9	37	4.1	9	2	8	53	6.6	13	1
		120	66	814	3,362	4.1	67	30	224	1,766	7.9	80	11

=== Playoffs ===
Year	Team	Games		Rushing					Receiving				
Year	Team	GP	GS	Att	Yds	Avg	Lng	TD	Rec	Yds	Avg	Lng	TD
1970	BAL	**3**	**3**	**65**	**215**	**3.3**	**13**	**2**	1	5	5.0	5	0
1978	MIA	1	0	2	0	0.0	0	0	**2**	**14**	**7.0**	**9**	0
		4	3	67	215	3.2	13	2	3	19	6.3	9	0
