= George Nock =

American football player (1946–2020)

No. 30, 37, 40
- Position: Running back

Personal information
- Born: March 4, 1946; Philadelphia, Pennsylvania, U.S.
- Died: November 22, 2020 (aged 74); Snellville, Georgia, U.S.
- Listed height: 5 ft 11 in (1.80 m)
- Listed weight: 200 lb (91 kg)

Career information
- High school: Benjamin Franklin (Philadelphia, Pennsylvania)
- College: Morgan State (1965-1968)
- NFL draft: 1969: 16th round, 416th overall pick

Career history
- New York Jets (1969-1971); Washington Redskins (1972)

Career NFL/AFL statistics
- Rushing yards: 556
- Rushing average: 2.9
- Receptions: 24
- Receiving yards: 190
- Total touchdowns: 11
- Stats at Pro Football Reference

George Verdell Nock (March 4, 1946 – November 22, 2020) was an American professional football player who was a running back for the New York Jets and Washington Redskins.

== Early life and college ==
Nock was born in Philadelphia, Pennsylvania then later moved to Baltimore Maryland and attended Morgan State University from 1964 to 1969, where he received a B.S. in psychology. He was a star running back while at Morgan; he also received All-American honorable mention, All-CIAA, All-State, and All American-Black Colleges honors. He was named captain of the team for two years.

== Professional career ==
Nock was selected by the Jets in the 16th round of the 1969 NFL/AFL draft. He played in the American Football League (AFL) for the Jets in 1969, and made the transition into the National Football League (NFL) for the Jets, continuing his career with them for two more seasons (1970–1971). Nock played out his option and was signed by the Redskins as a free agent before the 1972 season, with Washington surrendering two draft picks to the Jets in order to sign him. The Redskins were the National Football Conference champions for the 1972 season and Nock was on the Redskins roster for Super Bowl VII, which the Redskins lost.

After not playing for the Redskins in the 1973 season due to a knee injury, he was traded to the Baltimore Colts along with a draft pick in exchange for offensive guard Corny Johnson. Nock never played for the Colts and in September 1974 filed a lawsuit against the Redskins for negligence in treating a knee injury he suffered in a 1972 exhibition game against the Miami Dolphins.

== Personal life and death ==
Nock worked as a sculptor in bronze and drew in multiple media. He created "Legends Plaza" in 2017 at Morgan State University in Baltimore.

Nock died from causes related to COVID-19 at Eastside Medical Center in Snellville, Georgia, on November 22, 2020. He was 74.

== See also ==
- List of American Football League players
