= John Mackey (American football) =

American football player (1941–2011)

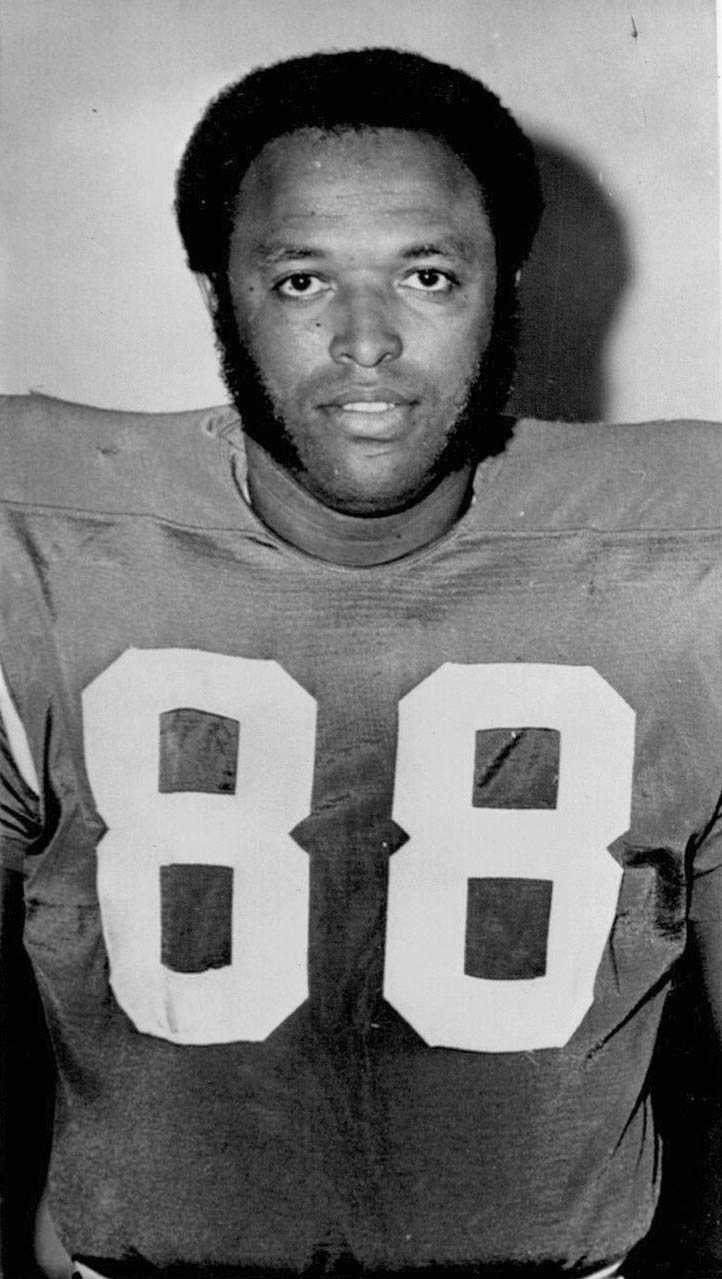
- Mackey in a press photo of 1972

No. 88, 89
- Position: Tight end

Personal information
- Born: September 24, 1941; Roosevelt, New York, U.S.
- Died: July 6, 2011 (aged 69); Baltimore, Maryland, U.S.
- Listed height: 6 ft 2 in (1.88 m)
- Listed weight: 224 lb (102 kg)

Career information
- High school: Hempstead (NY)
- College: Syracuse (1960–1962)
- NFL draft: 1963: 2nd round, 19th overall pick
- AFL draft: 1963: 5th round, 35th overall pick

Career history
- Baltimore Colts (1963–1971); San Diego Chargers (1972)

Awards and highlights
- Super Bowl champion (V); NFL champion (1968); 3× First-team All-Pro (1966–1968); 5× Pro Bowl (1963, 1965–1968); NFL 1960s All-Decade Team; NFL 50th Anniversary All-Time Team; NFL 100th Anniversary All-Time Team; Baltimore Ravens Ring of Honor; First-team All-Eastern (1962); Second-team All-Eastern (1961); Syracuse Orange No. 88 retired

Career NFL statistics
- Receptions: 331
- Receiving yards: 5,236
- Receiving touchdowns: 38
- Stats at Pro Football Reference
- Pro Football Hall of Fame

John Mackey (September 24, 1941 – July 6, 2011) was an American professional football player who was a tight end for the Baltimore Colts and the San Diego Chargers. He was born in Roosevelt, New York, and attended Syracuse University. He was the first president of the National Football League Players Association (NFLPA) following the AFL-NFL merger, serving from 1970 to 1973. Mackey was also a major reason the NFLPA created the "88 Plan", which financially supports ex-players who required living assistance in later years.

A five-time Pro Bowler, Mackey was inducted into the Pro Football Hall of Fame in 1992, the second pure tight end elected and is widely regarded as one of the greatest tight ends ever.

== College career ==
Mackey played three seasons at Syracuse University (1960–1962), alternating between the running back, tight end, and wide receiver position. His first two seasons were on the same team as Ernie Davis, the 1961 Heisman Trophy winner. Mackey caught a total of 27 passes for 481 yards and 5 touchdowns, while also rushing for 259 yards and 4 more scores. As a Junior, he set a school record with 321 receiving yards, and caught 4 passes in Syracuse's 15–14 win over the University of Miami in the 1961 Liberty Bowl. In Mackey's three seasons, Syracuse had a 20–10 record and won the Liberty Bowl each year. In addition to playing football at Syracuse he was also a member of the basketball & lacrosse teams.

== Professional career ==
Mackey was drafted by the Baltimore Colts with the 19th pick in the second round of the 1963 NFL draft. As a rookie, he averaged over 20 yards per catch, scored seven touchdowns, and earned a trip to the Pro Bowl. He also returned 9 kickoffs for 271 yards, an average of 30 yards per return.

He went on to play a total of 10 NFL seasons as tight end, and became known for his size and speed. Mackey played his first nine seasons with the Colts. After losing his starting role to Tom Mitchell entering the 1972 regular season, he requested to be traded. Colts general manager Joe Thomas placed him on the team's retired list instead, prompting Mackey to demand being put on waivers. He was not claimed by any team in an attempt by franchise owners to blackball him for having been the president of the National Football League Players Association (NFLPA). He eventually signed with the San Diego Chargers on September 18, 1972, after being contacted by the team's defensive backs coach Willie Wood hours after clearing waivers. He retired as an active player at the end of the 1972 season. Although a knee injury forced him into early retirement, Mackey only missed one game in his whole career.

During his 10 seasons in the NFL, Mackey scored 38 touchdowns and caught 331 passes for 5,236 yards. He also rushed 19 times for 127 yards. His career yards per catch average of 15.8 is currently the second-highest total among all Hall of Fame tight ends, trailing only Jackie Smith.

=== Super Bowl V ===
Mackey played in Super Bowl V on January 17, 1971. He was involved in a famous game-changing play where he caught a record-setting 75-yard touchdown pass from quarterback Johnny Unitas after the ball was deflected twice, once by fellow Colts player Eddie Hinton and once by opposing Dallas Cowboys defenseman Mel Renfro. Baltimore won the game 16–13, following a 32-yard field goal by Jim O'Brien with five seconds left.

=== Honors ===
During his playing career, Mackey played in five Pro Bowls, including in his rookie season. He was also named All-NFL three times. In 1992, Mackey was inducted into the Pro Football Hall of Fame, becoming only the second pure tight end to be awarded this honor. In 2019, he was one of five tight ends included in the NFL 100th Anniversary All-Time Team. In 1969, Mackey was selected to the NFL 50th Anniversary All-Time Team.

Mackey has been included in several lists of great NFL players. In 1999, The Sporting News ranked Mackey at 48 on their list of "The 100 Greatest Football Players." He also placed at number 42 on the NFL Network's list of the "Top 100 Football Players" in 2010. In 2021, The Athletic listed him as the 81st greatest player ever.

In 2001, the John Mackey Award was established by the Nassau County Sports Commission. The award is given yearly to the top college tight end. On September 15, 2007, Mackey's alma mater, Syracuse University, retired number 88 in his honor.

On September 27, 2017, Mackey was installed, posthumously, into the Nassau County High School Athletic Hall of Fame as an athlete. His widow, Sylvia, accepted the honor on his behalf. This was the third class of the Hall of fame, which is housed in the renovated Nassau County Veterans' Memorial Coliseum.

== NFL career statistics ==
Year	Team	Games		Receiving					Rushing					Fum
Year	Team	GP	GS	Rec	Yds	Avg	Lng	TD	Att	Yds	Avg	Lng	TD	Fum
1963	BAL	14	14	35	726	20.7	61	7	1	3	3.0	0	0	2
1964	BAL	14	14	22	406	18.5	62	2	1	-1	-1.0	-1	0	1
1965	BAL	14	14	40	814	20.4	68	7	1	7	7.0	7	0	2
1966	BAL	14	14	50	829	16.6	89	9	1	-6	-6.0	-6	0	0
1967	BAL	14	14	55	686	12.5	34	3	—	—	—	—	—	1
1968	BAL	14	14	45	644	14.3	45	5	10	103	10.3	33	0	1
1969	BAL	14	14	34	443	13.0	52	2	2	3	1.5	7	0	1
1970	BAL	14	11	28	435	15.5	54	3	—	—	—	—	—	1
1971	BAL	14	5	11	143	13.0	28	0	3	18	6.0	9	0	1
1972	SD	13	4	11	110	10.0	21	0	—	—	—	—	—	1
Career		139	118	331	5,236	15.8	89	38	19	127	6.7	33	0	11

== Post-playing career ==
=== NFL Players Association presidency ===
In 1970, Mackey became the first president of the National Football League Players Association following the merger of the National Football League and the American Football League. Although the NFL and AFL each had a candidate for president in mind, Mackey emerged as the leader both sides could agree on. Mackey held the position of president until September 1973.

In his first year as president, Mackey organized a strike following a lockout by owners, with NFL players seeking additional pension contributions and insurance benefits, as well as higher pre- and post-season pay. The strike resulted in increased fringe benefits for NFL players totalling more than $12 million. According to former teammate Ordell Braase, Mackey "had a vision for that job, which was more than just putting in time and keeping the natives calm. You don't get anything unless you really rattle the cage." In 1972, Mackey became the lead plaintiff in a court action which led to the overturning of the so-called "Rozelle Rule," which limited a player's ability to act as a free agent. In 1976, the Rozelle Rule was ruled to violate antitrust laws in Mackey v. NFL.

=== Post-career health problems ===
Several years after retiring from the NFL, Mackey began experiencing symptoms of dementia. After being diagnosed with frontal temporal dementia in 2000, in one incident at an airport checkpoint, Mackey refused to remove his Super Bowl and Hall of Fame rings at the metal detector. When a guard insisted he take them off, Mackey bolted through the checkpoint. It took four guards to subdue him. "I'm just so thankful they didn't shoot him because they had no idea about his mental condition," his wife Sylvia said after the incident. "They easily could have mistaken him for being a bomb-toting terrorist."

Mackey's condition worsened, and after caring for him for many years, in 2010 his family was forced to put him into the Keswick Memory Center, a full-time assisted living facility in Baltimore. Although Mackey received a small pension, it was not sufficient to cover the costs of his care, leading his wife Sylvia in 2006 to contact NFL commissioner Paul Tagliabue.

Once made aware of the problem, Tagliabue and NFLPA executive director Gene Upshaw responded with the "88 plan" in February 2007. Named for Mackey's jersey number, the plan provides $88,000 per year for nursing home care and up to $50,000 annually for adult day care for former NFL players, including Mackey, having dementia or Alzheimer's.

=== Death and legacy ===
Mackey died July 6, 2011, at the age of 69. It was revealed by a study by Boston University on his brain that he had chronic traumatic encephalopathy. He is one of at least 345 NFL players to be diagnosed after death with this disease, which is caused by repeated hits to the head.
