= Lonnie Hepburn =

American football player (born 1949)

No. 43
- Position: Defensive back

Personal information
- Born: May 12, 1949 (age 77); Miami, Florida, U.S.
- Listed height: 5 ft 11 in (1.80 m)
- Listed weight: 180 lb (82 kg)

Career information
- High school: Miami Northwestern
- College: Texas Southern
- NFL draft: 1971: 13th round, 333rd overall pick

Career history
- Baltimore Colts (1971–1972); Denver Broncos (1974)
- Stats at Pro Football Reference

Lonnie Hepburn (born May 12, 1949) is an American former professional football player who was a defensive back in the National Football League (NFL). He played college football for the Texas Southern Tigers and was selected by the Miami Dolphins in the 13th round (333rd overall) of the 1971 NFL draft. He played in the NFL for the Baltimore Colts from 1971 to 1972 and for the Denver Broncos in 1974.
