= Dennis Nelson (American football) =

American football player (born 1946)

- Nelson in 1977

No. 68, 77, 71
- Position: Offensive tackle

Personal information
- Born: February 9, 1946 (age 80); Kewanee, Illinois, U.S.
- Listed height: 6 ft 5 in (1.96 m)
- Listed weight: 260 lb (118 kg)

Career information
- High school: Wethersfield (Kewanee)
- College: Illinois State (1965-1968)
- NFL draft: 1969: 3rd round, 77th overall pick

Career history
- Baltimore Colts (1970–1974); Washington Redskins (1975)*; Philadelphia Eagles (1976–1977)
- * Offseason or practice squad member only

Awards and highlights
- Super Bowl champion (V)

Career NFL statistics
- Games played: 77
- Games Starts: 45
- Fumble recoveries: 3
- Stats at Pro Football Reference

Dennis Ray Nelson (born February 9, 1946) is an American former professional football player who was a tackle for seven seasons with the Baltimore Colts and the Philadelphia Eagles of the National Football League (NFL).

Nelson was a four-year football letter winner playing college football for the Illinois State Redbirds. He was a first-team Little All-American pick by the Associated Press on offense in 1968, a two-way all-conference tackle, and was selected in the third round of the 1969 NFL draft by the Baltimore Colts.

Nelson spent all of the 1969 season on the Colts' "taxi squad", only making the regular season roster in 1970 season. After playing in 1970 and 1971 in a reserve role, Nelson became a fixture of the offensive line for the next three years, starting in 41 of 42 games for the Colts.

The right tackle was made expendable in January 1975, however, when the Colts obtained perennial Pro Bowler George Kunz from the Atlanta Falcons as part of a trade for the number 1 overall pick in the 1975 NFL draft. Nelson reacted with disappointment to the news, threatening retirement rather than being cast into a battle for the starting left tackle job with his close friend, teammate David Taylor.

Nelson was traded to the Washington Redskins for draft choices on August 21, 1975, but the deal was cancelled when he refused to report to the Redskins, and his contract rights reverted to Baltimore. Nelson spent the 1975 season at home in his native Kewanee, Illinois, running his successful livestock farm that raised and marketed about 3,500 pigs a year.

The Colts then traded Nelson's contract rights to the Philadelphia Eagles, for whom he came off the bench in all 14 games of the 1976 season before seeking and obtaining his release.

He returned to the Colts hoping to make the 1977 Baltimore team but was unable to land a roster position. Instead he landed back with the Eagles, for whom he played the last two games of his career.

Nelson was a member of the Colts' Super Bowl V winning team.

He had his jersey retired by ISU on October 10, 1995.
