= John Andrews (American football) =

American football player (born 1948)

- Andrews in 1975

No. 81, 88, 36
- Positions: Tight end, running back

Personal information
- Born: November 2, 1948 (age 78); Indianapolis, Indiana, U.S.
- Listed height: 6 ft 3 in (1.91 m)
- Listed weight: 227 lb (103 kg)

Career information
- High school: Shortridge (IN)
- College: Indiana
- NFL draft: 1971: 5th round, 130th overall pick

Career history
- Baltimore Colts (1971)*; San Diego Chargers (1972); Baltimore Colts (1973–1974); Tampa Bay Buccaneers (1976)*
- * Offseason or practice squad member only

Career NFL statistics
- Games played: 23
- Receptions: 1
- Receiving yards: 1
- Touchdowns: 1
- Rushing attempts: 5
- Rushing yards: 6
- Kick returns: 2
- Kick return yards: 31
- Stats at Pro Football Reference

John Milton Andrews (b. November 2, 1948) is an American former professional football player who was a tight end and running back for three seasons in the National Football League (NFL) with the Baltimore Colts and San Diego Chargers. He played college football for the Indiana Hoosiers.

== Early life ==
John Andrews was born on November 2, 1948, in Indianapolis, Indiana. He went to high school at Shortridge High School.

== College career ==
He went to college at Indiana University Bloomington. He did not play football in 1968 or in 1969. In 1970 he had 36 catches for 417 yards and two touchdowns. In 1971 he had 29 receptions for 268 yards and one touchdown. He also had one rush for 18 yards.

== Professional career ==
=== Baltimore Colts ===
Andrews was selected in the fifth round (130th overall) of the 1971 NFL draft by the Baltimore Colts. He did not play for them that season.

=== San Diego Chargers ===
In 1972, he was traded to the San Diego Chargers. He only appeared in week one; a 3–34 loss against the San Francisco 49ers. He wore number 81 for the Chargers.

=== Baltimore Colts (second stint) ===
In 1973, he was signed by the team that drafted him, the Baltimore Colts. From week 1 to week three he did not have any statistics. In week 4 he had his first stat; a 13-yard kickoff return. In week 8 he had a one-yard touchdown catch. He only had one catch in the 1973 season. In 1974, he had 5 rushes for 6 yards.

=== Tampa Bay Buccaneers ===
In 1976, he signed with the Tampa Bay Buccaneers but was released before the first pre-season game.
