= Robbie Nichols =

American football player (1946–2011)

No. 51
- Position: Linebacker

Personal information
- Born: November 17, 1946; Cleveland, Oklahoma
- Died: June 24, 2011 (aged 64)
- Listed height: 6 ft 2 in (1.88 m)
- Listed weight: 225 lb (102 kg)

Career information
- High school: Cleveland High (Oklahoma)
- College: University of Tulsa

Career history
- (1970–1971): Baltimore Colts

Awards and highlights
- Super Bowl Champion (V)

Career statistics
- Interceptions: 0
- Games played: 18
- Stats at Pro Football Reference

Robert B. "Robbie" Nichols (born November 17, 1946 – June 24, 2011) was a professional American football linebacker in the National Football League. He attended the University of Tulsa. He competed in football and track for Tulsa. He would play with the Baltimore Colts in 1970 and 1971, and was a member of the Colts' Super Bowl V winning team.
