= Lynn Larson =

American football player (born 1948)

No. 67
- Position: Tackle

Personal information
- Born: March 9, 1948 (age 78); Phoenix, Arizona, U.S.
- Listed height: 6 ft 4 in (1.93 m)
- Listed weight: 254 lb (115 kg)

Career information
- High school: Alhambra (Phoenix, Arizona)
- College: Kansas State
- NFL draft: 1970: 4th round, 79th overall pick

Career history
- Chicago Bears (1970)*; Baltimore Colts (1970–1971); BC Lions (1972)
- * Offseason or practice squad member only

Awards and highlights
- Super Bowl champion (V)

Career NFL statistics
- Games played: 1
- Stats at Pro Football Reference

Lyndon Arthur Larson (born March 9, 1948) is an American former professional football player who was a tackle for the Baltimore Colts of the National Football League (NFL). He played college football for the Kansas State Wildcats.
