= John Sykes (American football) =

American football player (1949–2019)

No. 46
- Position: Running back

Personal information
- Born: May 13, 1949; Baltimore, Maryland, U.S.
- Died: July 8, 2019 (aged 70); Baltimore, Maryland, U.S.
- Listed height: 5 ft 11 in (1.80 m)
- Listed weight: 195 lb (88 kg)

Career information
- High school: Baltimore City College
- College: Morgan State
- NFL draft: 1972: 7th round, 169th overall pick

Career history
- Baltimore Colts (1972)*; St. Louis Cardinals (1972)*; San Diego Chargers (1972); Baltimore Colts (1973)*; Charlotte Hornets (1975)
- * Offseason or practice squad member only
- Stats at Pro Football Reference

John Sykes (May 13, 1949 – July 8, 2019) was an American professional football running back. Sykes played college football at Morgan State University, where he broke several rushing records previously held by Pro Football Hall of Famer Leroy Kelly. In his senior year and Morgan State he rushed for 1,007 yards on 193 carries. That year he was named an honorable mention to the Little All-America college football team and named to the all-MEAC team.

Sykes was selected 169th overall by the Baltimore Colts in the seventh round of the 1972 NFL draft. After being cut by the Colts before the regular season started he was signed by the St. Louis Cardinals in September. After not playing in any games for the Cardinals he was cut and then signed by the San Diego Chargers in November 1972 and placed on their taxi squad. After being activated by the Chargers he played in 2 games for the Chargers, returning two kickoffs for 44 yards. He returned one kickoff for 24 yards against the Denver Broncos on December 10, 1972, and he returned one kickoff for 20 yards against the Pittsburgh Steelers on December 17. He was cut by the Chargers during training camp in 1973 and resigned by the Colts, but the Colts also waived him before the season started. In 1974 he played semi-pro football for the Hanover Rhinos. In 1975 he played for the Charlotte Hornets of the World Football League (WFL) but his season was cut short by torn knee ligaments and the league folded during the season.

After leaving professional football, Sykes became a physical education teacher at his alma mater of Baltimore City College and later at Highlandtown Middle School. Sykes died in 2019 of an apparent stroke at the age of 70.
