= Billy Newsome =

American football player (born 1948)

No. 81, 78, 87
- Position: Defensive end

Personal information
- Born: March 2, 1948; Jacksonville, Texas, U.S.
- Died: November 12, 2024 (aged 76); Jacksonville, Texas, U.S.
- Listed height: 6 ft 4 in (1.93 m)
- Listed weight: 250 lb (113 kg)

Career information
- College: Grambling State
- NFL draft: 1970: 5th round, 122nd overall pick

Career history
- Baltimore Colts (1970–1972); New Orleans Saints (1973–1974); New York Jets (1975–1976); Chicago Bears (1977)

Awards and highlights
- Super Bowl champion (V); Second-team Little All-American (1969)

Career NFL statistics
- Sacks: 49.5
- Fumble recoveries: 8
- Interceptions: 3
- Interception yards: 20
- Touchdowns: 1
- Stats at Pro Football Reference

William Ray Newsome (March 2, 1948 – November 12, 2024) was an American professional football player who was a defensive end in the National Football League (NFL) for the Baltimore Colts, New Orleans Saints, New York Jets, and the Chicago Bears. He played college football for the Grambling State Tigers.

He was traded along with a 1973 fourth-round pick (86th overall–Jim Merlo) from the Colts to the Saints for a 1973 first-round selection (2nd overall–Bert Jones) on January 29, 1973.

Newsome died on November 12, 2024, aged 76.
