= Ted Hendricks =

Guatemalan-born American football player (born 1948)

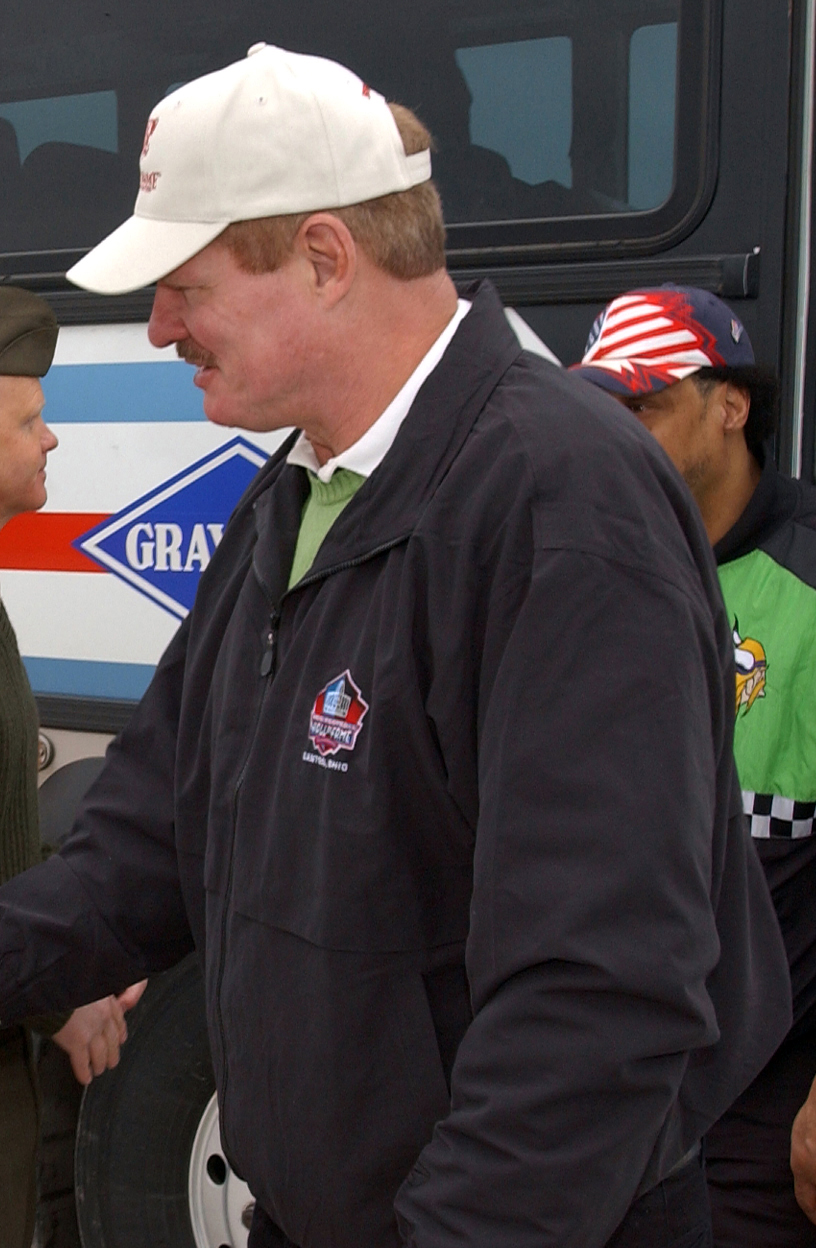
- Hendricks in 2005

No. 83, 56
- Position: Linebacker

Personal information
- Born: November 1, 1947 (age 79); Guatemala City, Guatemala
- Listed height: 6 ft 7 in (2.01 m)
- Listed weight: 220 lb (100 kg)

Career information
- High school: Hialeah (Hialeah, Florida, U.S.)
- College: Miami (FL) (1966–1968)
- NFL draft: 1969: 2nd round, 33rd overall pick

Career history
- Baltimore Colts (1969–1973); Green Bay Packers (1974); Oakland / Los Angeles Raiders (1975–1983)

Awards and highlights
- 4× Super Bowl champion (V, XI, XV, XVIII); 4× First-team All-Pro (1971, 1974, 1980, 1982); 2× Second-team All-Pro (1972, 1976); 8× Pro Bowl (1971–1974, 1980–1983); George Halas Award (1984); NFL 75th Anniversary All-Time Team; NFL 100th Anniversary All-Time Team; NFL 1970s All-Decade Team; NFL 1980s All-Decade Team; Baltimore Ravens Ring of Honor; UPI Lineman of the Year (1968); 2× Unanimous All-American (1967, 1968); Second-team All-American (1966); Miami Hurricanes No. 89 retired; NFL record: Most career safeties: 4 (tied)

Career NFL statistics
- Sacks: 61
- Safeties: 4
- Interceptions: 26
- Interception yards: 332
- Fumble recoveries: 16
- Total touchdowns: 4
- Stats at Pro Football Reference
- Pro Football Hall of Fame
- College Football Hall of Fame

Theodore Paul Hendricks (born November 1, 1947), nicknamed "the Mad Stork" and "Kick 'Em in the head Ted", is a Guatemalan-American former professional football linebacker who played for 15 seasons with the Baltimore Colts, the Green Bay Packers, and the Oakland / Los Angeles Raiders in the National Football League (NFL).

He was a member of four Super Bowl-winning teams and was elected to the Pro Football Hall of Fame in 1990 after being elected to the College Football Hall of Fame in 1987. He is the first Guatemalan-born player in the NFL. He played college football for the Miami Hurricanes.

== Early life ==
Hendricks was born on November 1, 1947, in Guatemala City to a Guatemalan-born mother of Italian descent and an American father. His parents met in Guatemala while working for Pan American Airlines. Shortly after his birth, the family moved to Hialeah, Florida. Hendricks was raised in Miami Springs, Florida. He was an honor student at Hialeah High School, where he competed in basketball, baseball, track and field and football. Hendricks was raised bilingual and speaks fluent Spanish.

== College career ==
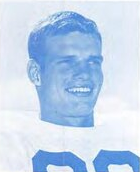
Hendricks, c. 1968

Hendricks received 4 scholarship offers (baseball, basketball, football and academic) from the University of Miami. He accepted the academic scholarship and took the honors curriculum as a math major and psychology minor. He is best known for his football prowess while playing stand-up defensive end for the University of Miami during the 1966 through 1968 seasons. He was a three-time All-American (1966, 1967, 1968), consensus first-team All-American in 1967-68, and finished fifth in the 1968 Heisman Trophy voting. In 1968, he was named National Lineman of the Year by the United Press. While in college, Hendricks became a member of Kappa Sigma fraternity.

While playing for Miami, Hendricks made 327 total tackles (the most ever by a Miami defensive lineman). He also led the team in solo tackles by a defensive lineman with 139. Hendricks also recovered 12 fumbles during his playing career. He recorded a career-high of 4 quarterback sacks against the University of Florida in 1968. In his junior year of 1967 he caused nine turnovers.

It was at Miami that the tall, thin Hendricks gained the nickname "the Mad Stork." It was a nickname that would follow him until his NFL days, when he was simply called "the Stork". His Baltimore Colts teammate Mike Curtis attested to the appropriateness of the moniker, noting that when the 6'7" Hendricks ran with "those long, skinny legs flapping every which way...he really does look like a mad stork." (Hendricks has long advocated Curtis be inducted into the Pro Football Hall of Fame.)

Hendricks's Miami jersey was retired in 1997. In 1987, he was elected to the College Football Hall of Fame. In 2020, ESPN selected its list of the top 150 players in the history of college football, naming Hendricks at number 85.

Hendricks was inducted into the University of Miami Sports Hall of Fame in 1980.

The Ted Hendricks Award is given annually to college football's top defensive end. The award is presented by his own 501(c)(3) foundation, the Ted Hendricks Foundation.

== Professional career ==
=== Baltimore Colts ===
Hendricks began his professional football career as a second-round pick of the Baltimore Colts in the 1969 NFL/AFL draft. He was initially listed as a defensive end, which is why he had the unusual number (for a linebacker) of 83. After coach Don Shula converted him to linebacker, he entered the starting lineup in the sixth game of his rookie 1969 season, the beginning of 69 consecutive starts with the Colts. He made 32 tackles and 2 sacks on the quarterback and knocked down 2 passes and blocked a field goal.

He played a key role in the Colts' 1970 Super Bowl V-winning season. He was the starting strong-side linebacker and recorded 67 tackles and 1-1/2 sacks while intercepting a pass. He also recorded 2 blocked kicks and knocked down 5 passes. He had the key sack of Oakland Raiders quarterback Daryle Lamonica in the AFC Championship Game, leading the Colts toward the Super Bowl. He and fellow linebackers Mike Curtis and Ray May anchored a unit that was one of the NFL's best in defending against the run; which was 102.8 yards per game – 6th in the NFL, and allowing only 6 rushing touchdowns all season (tied with the Los Angeles Rams for second in the NFL). They allowed only 234 points, 7th in the NFL.

He was chosen to the first of four All-Pro selections in 1971 by the Associated Press (AP), Pro Football Writers of America, the Newspaper Enterprise Association (NEA), and Pro Football Weekly. He had 63 tackles and picked off 5 passes while batting away 7 passes. He also recorded 5 sacks and blocked 2 more kicks. He returned a fumble 31 yards for a touchdown. The Colts defense was ranked #1 in the NFL in fewest rushing yards allowed and lowest rushing attempt. The Colts made the playoffs but did not advance to the Super Bowl, losing to the Miami Dolphins.

In 1972 Hendricks recorded 99 tackles, 6 sacks, knocked down 7 passes, intercepted two passes and blocked 2 field goals. The following season Hendricks made 86 tackles and 4 sacks (bringing his Colt total to 18-1/2) and picked off 3 passes (making his Colt total 11) for 33 yards, while batting away 7 passes for the third consecutive season and blocking a punt. He was named second-team All-Pro in both 1972 and 1973 by the NEA, first team All-Conference both years by the AP, and United Press International (UPI) named him first team All-Conference in 1972 and second team All-Conference in 1973. In his Colts career, Hendricks intercepted 11 passes, had five fumble recoveries (including one for a touchdown), and unofficially had 347 tackles and 18½ sacks.

He played out his option with the Colts who then traded him to the Packers.

=== Green Bay Packers ===
One week after signing to begin play in 1975 with the World Football League's Jacksonville Sharks, Hendricks was traded along with a 1975 second-round pick (28th overall–traded to Los Angeles Rams for John Hadl) from the Colts to the Green Bay Packers for Tom MacLeod and a 1975 eighth-round selection (192nd overall–Northwestern State running back Mario Cage) on August 13, 1974.

He was assigned jersey no. 56. Hendricks was then in the second straight option year of his NFL contract, and had one of his best seasons: five interceptions, seven blocked kicks (3 field goals, 3 punts and 1 extra point) and a safety, two sacks, 75 tackles, and two knocked down passes while again earning consensus first team All-Pro honors for the second time from the AP, Pro Football Writers, NEA and Pro Football Weekly.

With the World Football League bankrupt, owner Al Davis of the Raiders sent two first round draft choices to the Packers for the rights to Hendricks, signing him as a limited free agent.

=== Oakland / Los Angeles Raiders ===
After the trade, Hendricks went on to nine seasons with the Raiders before retiring after the 1983 season. In his first year on the Raider team, coach John Madden used him sparingly, partly as a result of a feud Madden had with Al Davis. He started only five of 14 games. However, Madden eventually had him starting by the end of the 1975 season. Hendricks recorded only 27 tackles and 3 passes batted and 2 interceptions. He was used in the Raiders nickel defense and recorded 5 sacks in that role. He also had a safety.

He also recorded 4 sacks in a playoff win against the Cincinnati Bengals. His final sack of Kenny Anderson took the Bengals out of field goal range, with Bengals coach Paul Brown saying Hendricks "'earned his entire season's salary with that one play.'" Injuries limited the number of defensive lineman Madden had available so he used Hendricks as a stand-up defensive end, the position Hendricks played in college. At season's end the Raiders defense was among the NFL's top units, despite injuries to a few key defensive linemen. The Raiders led the NFL in interceptions and they ranked 2nd in the NFL in sacks, 7th in fewest points allowed, and were 3rd in total defense.

The next year Hendricks became a full-time player with the Raiders, and the Raiders switched to a 3–4 defense early in the season. Hendricks played the weakside linebacker, since All-Pro Phil Villapiano played Hendricks's strong-side; he made 57 tackles, 6 sacks, knocked down 5 passes while picking off one and blocking 2 punts. The Raiders defense was 6th in the NFL in sacks but did not finish in the top ten in points allowed or total defense. The Raiders won Super Bowl XI, the first in franchise history, and the first of three Super Bowl titles in seven seasons. Hendricks was second-team All-Pro for the first of three consecutive years.

In 1977, Hendricks moved back to the strong-side linebacker position due to Villapiano's injury and made 56 tackles, 2 sacks and knocked down 4 passes. The Raider defense was 7th in the NFL against the run and tied for 3rd in allowing the fewest rushing touchdowns. They also tied for third in the NFL with 26 interceptions.

In the 1978 season Hendricks recorded a stellar season with 78 tackles, 6 sacks, 3 interceptions, 8 passes defensed and 2 fumble recoveries. The defense tied for 4th in most interceptions in the NFL and scored 4 defensive touchdowns which tied them for 2nd most in the NFL. They were tied for 10th in fewest points allowed as well.

A vote among Raider coaches showed that all of them had voted to release Hendricks at season's end. However, owner Al Davis insisted on keeping Hendricks. Hendricks ended up making 76 tackles with a career-high 8-1/2 sacks, 3 interceptions (bringing his career total to 26) while batting 16 passes and blocking 3 kicks. The defense rebounded to #5 against the run in the NFL, #1 in intercepting passes, and were 3rd in sacking opponents quarterbacks, and 11th in the NFL in total defense and 10th in fewest points allowed. In 1980 he was a consensus first-team All-Pro for the first time since 1974 and he helped the Raiders to their win in Super Bowl XV while going to another Pro Bowl.

Hendricks was All-Pro and All-AFC in the strike-shortened 1982 season as Hendricks made 28 tackles and seven sacks in just nine games while he deflected 2 passes. The Raiders were 8–1 but were stunned in a playoff loss to the New York Jets, although Hendricks had a sack and two fumble recoveries in the game. The Raiders defense was 2nd in fewest rushing yards allowed and first in sacking the opposing quarterback, while being 22nd overall in points allowed, and 27th out of 28 teams in passing yards allowed.

In his final campaign, 1983, Hendricks played less than at any point since 1975 but still made his eighth Pro Bowl and was second team All-AFC while recording 41 tackles, two sacks and deflecting four passes. He also blocked the 25th kick of his career and was a part of the Raiders Super Bowl XVIII victory, though he did not record a defensive statistic. The defense was 4th in the NFL against the run, tied for 2nd in sacking the quarterback, and fifth in total defense and 13th in allowing the fewest points allowed while being eighth in allowing the fewest touchdowns from scrimmage.

== Accomplishments ==
Hendricks was a member of four Super Bowl-winning teams (three with the Raiders and one with the Colts) and was a Pro Bowl selection eight times, at least once with each of his three NFL teams.

Hendricks played in 215 consecutive regular-season games. He also participated in eight Pro Bowl games, seven AFC championships, and four Super Bowls (V with the Colts, XI, XV and XVIII with the Raiders). Hendricks was named first team All-Pro as a Colt in 1971, as a Packer in 1974, and twice as a Raider in 1980 and 1982. He also earned second-team All-Pro honors five other times (1972, '73, '76, '77, '78). He also earned All-conference honors in 1971, '72, '74, '76, '80, '81 and '82, while being named 2nd-team All-AFC in 1973, '78 and '83.

Hendricks is the all-time kick blocker with 25, and in 2019 the NFL Football Journal named him the best punt and kick blocker of all time. He had 26 interceptions (including one touchdown return), 16 fumble recoveries, and four safeties over his career. The four safeties are tied for most in a career. Unofficially, he had 60.5 sacks for his career. His final game was a Raiders victory in Super Bowl XVIII, starting at left linebacker.

Hendricks was elected to the Pro Football Hall of Fame in 1990, his second year of eligibility. In 1999, he was ranked number 64 on The Sporting News' list of the 100 Greatest Football Players. In 2019, Hendricks was selected as a member of the NFL 100th Anniversary All-Time Team. In 1994, he was named as one of the members of the NFL's all time 75th anniversary team. He was named to the NFL 1970s All-Decade Team, and 1980s All Decade Team. During the commemoration of the 100th Anniversary of the NFL, Ted Hendricks was named 82nd in "Top 100: NFL's Greatest Players" of all time. In 2021, The Athletic listed him as the 77th greatest player ever.

He became a member of the California Sports Hall of Fame in 2012.

He currently works on behalf of ex-players as part of the Hall of Fame Players Association, where he has served as vice-president. His Ted Hendricks Foundation supports health, education and research programs. Since 2002, the Ted Hendricks Award is presented to the most outstanding collegiate player at defensive end each year.

He has been awarded the Order of the Quetzal, the highest award for civilians, by his native Guatemala.

Ted Hendricks Stadium in Hialeah, Florida, is named in his honor.
