= Jerry Logan =

American football player (born 1941)

No. 20
- Position: Safety

Personal information
- Born: August 27, 1941 (age 85); Graham, Texas, U.S.
- Listed height: 6 ft 1 in (1.85 m)
- Listed weight: 185 lb (84 kg)

Career information
- High school: Graham (TX)
- College: West Texas State (1959-1962)
- NFL draft: 1963: 4th round, 47th overall pick
- AFL draft: 1963: 9th round, 65th overall pick

Career history
- Baltimore Colts (1963–1972)

Awards and highlights
- Super Bowl champion (V); NFL champion (1968); 3× Pro Bowl (1965, 1970, 1971)

Career NFL statistics
- Games played: 140
- Interceptions: 34
- Interception return yards: 397
- Touchdowns: 5
- Stats at Pro Football Reference

Jerry Don Logan (born August 27, 1941) is an American former professional football player who was a safety for 10 seasons with the Baltimore Colts of the National Football League (NFL). He was a member of the Colts' team that won Super Bowl V.

== Early life ==
Jerry Logan was born on August 27, 1941, in Graham, Texas. Logan attended Graham High School, where he played football and basketball. On the football team, Logan was a two-way star as a quarterback on offense and defensive back on defense. Coming out of high school, Logan did not receive scholarship offers for football. Through a mutual connection with head coach Frank Kimbrough of West Texas State (now West Texas A&M), Logan earned a tryout with the team.

== College career ==
Logan played for West Texas State from 1959-1962, starting on the varsity team as a freshman. Logan played in all facets of the game, as a halfback on offense, a safety on defense, kicked extra points, and returned kickoffs.

During his senior season in 1962, Logan led the NCAA in scoring with 110 points. Logan scored 13 touchdowns and kicked 32 extra points during the year. His performance led West Texas State to a 9-2 record and an appearance in the 1962 Sun Bowl against Ohio.

In that game, Logan would score a touchdown and intercept a pass, going on to win the Sun Bowl MVP as West Texas State defeated Ohio by the score of 15-14.

== Professional career ==
Logan was selected in both the 1963 NFL draft (by the Baltimore Colts in the 4th round) and the 1963 AFL draft (by the Oakland Raiders in the 9th round). He chose to sign with the NFL, and by the end of his rookie season was the starting left safety for the Colts. In his second season, Logan intercepted six passes and was named 2nd team NFL All-Pro by UPI. In 1967, Logan returned a punt for a 43 yard touchdown against the Detroit Lions. In both 1965 and 1970, Logan returned 2 interceptions for touchdowns in each year and would be named to the Pro Bowl after each year, as well as the 1971 season.

Logan played in two Super Bowls with the Colts, and clinched the win in Super Bowl V by intercepting a Craig Morton pass on the final play of the game. After the 1972 season, Logan was traded to the Los Angeles Rams, but retired before training camp the next season. For his career, Logan intercepted 34 passes, and had five interception returns for touchdowns, which remains a Colts franchise record to this day.

== See also ==
- List of NCAA major college football yearly scoring leaders
