= Cornelius Johnson (offensive lineman) =

American football player (1943–2017)

No. 61, 76
- Position: Offensive guard

Personal information
- Born: June 12, 1943; Richmond, Virginia, U.S.
- Died: July 11, 2017 (aged 74); Prescott, Arizona, U.S.
- Listed height: 6 ft 2 in (1.88 m)
- Listed weight: 245 lb (111 kg)

Career information
- High school: Richmond (VA)
- College: Virginia Union
- NFL draft: 1967: 8th round, 204th overall pick

Career history
- Baltimore Colts (1967–1973); Harrisburg Capitols (1967); The Hawaiians (1974–1975)

Awards and highlights
- Super Bowl champion (V); NFL champion (1968)

Career NFL statistics
- Games played: 74
- Games started: 7
- Stats at Pro Football Reference

Cornelius Otis Johnson (June 12, 1943 – July 11, 2017) was an American professional football offensive guard who played six seasons with the Baltimore Colts of the National Football League (NFL). He was drafted by the Colts in the eighth round of the 1967 NFL/AFL draft. He played college football at Virginia Union University and attended Richmond High School in Richmond, Virginia. He was a member of the Colts team that won Super Bowl V. He was also a member of the Harrisburg Capitols and The Hawaiians.

== Professional career ==
Johnson was selected in the eighth round by the Baltimore Colts with the 204th overall pick in the 1967 NFL/AFL draft. He played in 74 games, starting seven, for the Colts from 1967 to 1973. He also played for the Harrisburg Capitols of the Atlantic Coast Football League in 1967. The Capitols served as Baltimore's farm club. The Colts won Super Bowl V against the Dallas Cowboys on January 17, 1971.

Johnson played in nineteen games for The Hawaiians of the World Football League from 1974 to 1975.

== Personal life ==
Johnson wore a prosthetic leg after being told, upon examination of a leg injury, that he had to have his lower right leg amputated due to complications from diabetes and MRSA. He was also blind in his right eye and partially blind in his left due to a stroke. He and his wife previously owned a helicopter business in Hawaii. Johnson had served as a mentor to student athletes in Prescott, Arizona ever since he arrived in the area during the late 1990s.

He died on July 11, 2017.
