= Ray May =

American football player (born 1945)

- May, c. 1970

No. 59, 56
- Position: Linebacker

Personal information
- Born: June 4, 1945 (age 81); Los Angeles, California, U.S.
- Listed height: 6 ft 1 in (1.85 m)
- Listed weight: 230 lb (104 kg)

Career information
- High school: Los Angeles
- College: USC
- NFL draft: 1967: 4th round, 89th overall pick

Career history
- Pittsburgh Steelers (1967–1969); Baltimore Colts (1970–1973); Denver Broncos (1973–1975)

Awards and highlights
- Super Bowl champion (V); "Whizzer" White NFL Man of the Year (1971); First-team All-Pac-8 (1966)

Career NFL statistics
- Interceptions: 13
- Fumble recoveries: 4
- Touchdowns: 1
- Sacks: 7
- Stats at Pro Football Reference

Reginald Raymond May (born June 4, 1945) is an American former professional football player who was a linebacker in the National Football League (NFL) from 1967 to 1975. During his career, he played for the Pittsburgh Steelers, Baltimore Colts, and Denver Broncos. May was a member of the Baltimore Colts' 1970 Super Bowl V winning team. He played college football at the University of Southern California.

== Early life ==
Ray May was born June 4, 1945, in Los Angeles, California. He attended Los Angeles High School where he starred in football and baseball. In baseball, May played first base and was named to the All-Southern League team as a senior. In football, May earned WSC All-League honorable mention honors on both offense and defense as a senior. He played tight end on offense and defensive end.

== College career ==
May played football at the University of Southern California from 1964–1966 where he featured as a defensive end. As a senior, May and USC appeared in the 1967 Rose Bowl where they were defeated by Purdue 14–13.

== Professional career ==
May was selected in the fourth round of the 1967 NFL/AFL draft by the Pittsburgh Steelers as the 89th overall selection.

May spent his first three years of his career in Pittsburgh, spending the last two seasons as a starter.

May was traded to the Baltimore Colts prior to the 1970 NFL season in exchange for running back Preston Pearson and defensive back Ocie Austin. In Baltimore, May made up part of a potent linebacking corps that included Pro Football Hall of Fame member Ted Hendricks and All-Pro Mike Curtis. May was a member of the Colts team that won Super Bowl V against the Dallas Cowboys in January 1971.

Mike Curtis called May and Hendricks, "two of my favorite guys and two of our best players." Curtis also expressed great admiration for May as a "remarkable man" for spending "nearly all his time — and damn near all his money" raising three troubled adopted children as a bachelor. May won the "Whizzer" White NFL Man of the Year Award following the 1971 season.

May began the 1973 NFL season in Baltimore, but lost his starting position to Stan White. May claimed that he asked to be traded by Colts general manager Joe Thomas. His request was granted following week three, when May was traded to the Denver Broncos in exchange for draft considerations. May remained with the Broncos until the 1975 season.

== Personal life ==
May adopted several children throughout his life and ran a ranch for underprivileged youth in Kansas.
