= Baltimore Colts =

Professional American football team in Baltimore, Maryland, from 1953 to 1983

Logo
Wordmark

General information
- Founded: 1953
- Folded: 1983
- Headquartered: Baltimore, Maryland
- Colors: Royal blue, white

Personnel
- Owners: Carroll Rosenbloom (1953–1972); Robert Irsay (1972–1983)
- Head coach: Keith Molesworth (1953); Weeb Ewbank (1954–1962); Don Shula (1963–1969); Don McCafferty (1970–1972); John Sandusky (1972); Howard Schnellenberger (1973–1974); Joe Thomas (1974); Ted Marchibroda (1975–1979); Mike McCormack (1980–1981); Frank Kush (1982–1983)

Team history
- Baltimore Colts (1953–1983); Indianapolis Colts (1984–present)

Home fields
- Baltimore Memorial Stadium (1953–1983)

League / conference affiliations
- National Football League (1953–1983): Western Conference (1953–1969); Coastal Division (1967–1969); American Football Conference (1970–1983); AFC East (1970–1983)

Championships
- League championships: 3†: NFL championships (pre-1970 AFL–NFL merger) (3) 1958, 1959, 1968; Super Bowl championships: 1 1970 (V); † – Does not include 1968 NFL championship won during the same season that the Super Bowl was contested
- Conference championships: 5: NFL Western: 1958, 1959, 1964, 1968; AFC: 1970
- Division championships: 5: NFL Coastal: 1968; AFC East: 1970, 1975, 1976, 1977

Playoff appearances (10)
- NFL: 1958, 1959, 1964, 1965, 1968, 1970, 1971, 1975, 1976, 1977

The Baltimore Colts were a professional American football team based in Baltimore from 1953 to 1983, when its owner Robert Irsay moved the franchise to Indianapolis. The team was named for Baltimore's history of horse breeding and racing. It was the second incarnation of the Baltimore Colts, the first having played for three years in the All-America Football Conference and one in the National Football League (NFL). The Baltimore Colts played their home games at Memorial Stadium.

== Franchise history ==
=== AAFC Baltimore Colts ===
As the result of a fan contest in Baltimore, won by Charles Evans of Middle River in suburban eastern Baltimore County, the team was renamed the "Baltimore Colts". On September 7, 1947, wearing the green and silver uniforms, the Colts, under Head Coach Cecil Isbell, won their initial All-America Football Conference game in the A.A.F.C.'s second season, 16–7, over the Brooklyn Dodgers.

Home site for the new AAFC games in "The Monumental City" was the old 1922 Municipal Stadium (also known as "Baltimore Stadium" or "Venable Stadium" - located in previous Venable Park) on the north side of 33rd Street boulevard in northeast Baltimore, later renovated and rebuilt with an upper tier added the following year for use also by the new American League of major league baseball's relocated franchise, the Baltimore Orioles). The football team concluded its inaugural season before a record Baltimore crowd of 51,583 by losing to the New York Yankees, 21–7. The Colts finished with a 2–11–1 record, good for a fourth-place finish in the Eastern Division of the A.A.F.C. The Colts completed the 1948 season with a 7–8 record, tying the Buffalo Bills for the division title. The Colts compiled a 1–11 mark in their third season of 1949. Y. A. Tittle, later to gain Hall of Fame status a decade later with the NFL's New York Giants, was the Colts starting quarterback.

After four years of inter-league rivalry, competition, and player contract raiding, the A.A.F.C. and N.F.L. merged in 1950, and the Colts joined the reorganized new NFL, along with the San Francisco 49ers and the Cleveland Browns. After posting a 1–11 record for the second consecutive year, the NFL franchise of just one season was dissolved by the League on January 18, 1951. But many Baltimore fans protested the loss of their team and continued to support the marching band (the second in professional football, after that of the Washington Redskins) and fan club, both of which remained in operation ("in exile" status) and worked for the team's revival.

After two seasons without professional football, NFL Commissioner Bert Bell challenged the City of Baltimore under Mayor Thomas L. J. D'Alesandro Jr., in December 1952 to sell 15,000 season tickets within six weeks in order to re-enter the NFL. That 15,000-ticket quota was reached in just four weeks and three days.

=== Dallas Texans ===
The 1953 iteration of the Baltimore Colts traces its original roots to the Dayton Triangles of the NFL, and eventually the New York Yanks who played in Yankee Stadium in 1950 and 1951. Owner Ted Collins then turned the money-losing franchise back to the league, which sold it to Texan oil millionaire Giles Miller.

Miller moved the team to Dallas, where it played the 1952 NFL season as the Dallas Texans, with team colors of blue and white. This marked the first expansion of the NFL into Texas and the southern part of the United States. Fans stayed away from the bad Texans team in droves and on November 14, 1952, the Texans owner returned ownership of the NFL during mid-season.

On January 23, 1953, with the encouragement of the city's civic and business leaders, under the principal ownership of Carroll Rosenbloom, the NFL sold the assets of the defunct Dallas Texans franchise to Baltimore where, keeping the "Colts" nickname, the Texans team colors of blue and white were used. This is the franchise that exists today in Indianapolis in the modern National Football League.

=== In Baltimore ===
==== 1953–1967: Johnny Unitas era ====
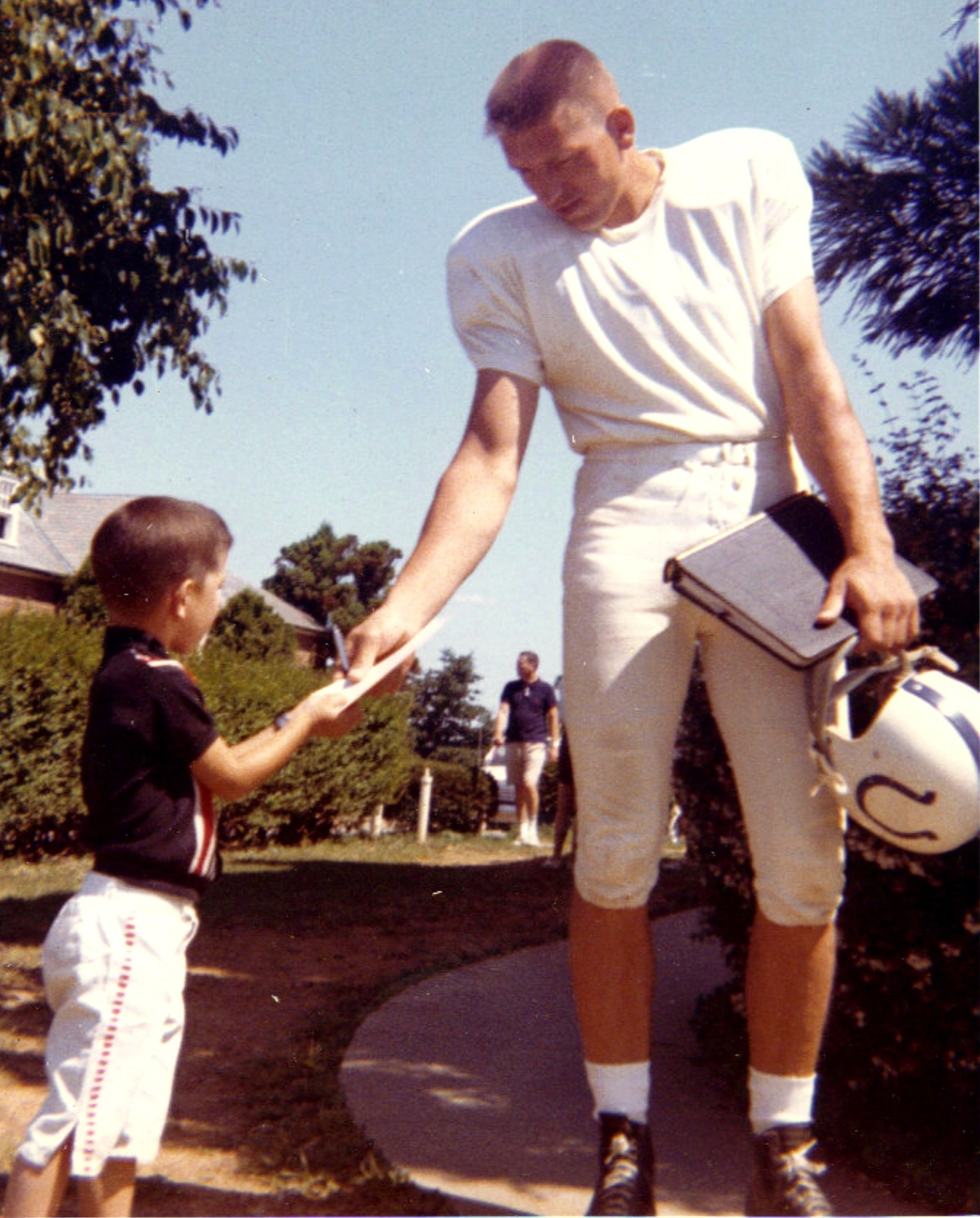
Pro Football Hall of Fame inductee Johnny Unitas was the Baltimore Colts' starting quarterback and famed "Number 19", from 1956 to 1972. Unitas was raised in the Pittsburgh area and played earlier for the University of Louisville in Louisville, Kentucky

In 1953, the second incarnation of the Baltimore Colts took the field for the first time at Memorial Stadium (also used temporarily by the old Baltimore Orioles minor league team in the International League since the burning in July 1944 of their Oriole Park home farther southeast at Greenmount Avenue and 29th Street in Waverly). The stadium was being rebuilt and adding a second upper tier to old Municipal Stadium for use by the following year of Major League Baseball's Baltimore Orioles franchise in the American League, which moved that November from St. Louis, Missouri, where it had been the St. Louis Browns. The 33rd Street field was sometimes called "Baltimore Stadium" or "Venable Stadium" for its location in the former Venable Park along the north side of the 33rd Street boulevard. It was built as a football-only bowl in 1922 in only seven months and later expanded to hold almost 100,000 fans for the frequent high school and local collegiate/university games there during the following three decades), on September 27 to face off against the Chicago Bears. The Colts would go on to win the game 13–9 and stun the Bears. The team's lack of experience showed as the team finished 3–9. In 1955, the Colts had 12 rookies make the team. In 1956, quarterback George Shaw went down with a serious injury in the fourth game of the season. The Colts' unproven backup, Johnny Unitas, would go on to win half the remaining eight games to give the Colts a record of 5–7 for the season.

The Colts won their first NFL Championship in 1958, in a game widely known as the "Greatest Game Ever Played" for its dramatic conclusion. Quarterback Johnny Unitas marched the Colts downfield in sudden death overtime and Alan Ameche scored the winning touchdown on a 1-yard run. Much of the credit for Baltimore's success went to Hall of Famers Johnny Unitas, halfback Lenny Moore, and wide receiver Raymond Berry, as well as role players such as linebacker Ray May.

After the Colts' first NFL championship, the team once again posted a 9–3 record during the 1959 season and once again defeated the Giants in the NFL Championship Game to claim their second title in back to back fashion. After the two championships in 1958 and 1959, the Colts did not return to the NFL Championship for four seasons. In 1963, Don Shula succeeded Ewbank as head coach. In Shula's second season, the Colts compiled a 12–2 record, but lost 27–0 to the Cleveland Browns in the NFL Championship. In 1965 the Colts played the Green Bay Packers in a playoff to determine who would go to the NFL Championship game. The Colts were leading 10–7 over the Green Bay Packers with two minutes left to play when the Packers' kicker, Don Chandler seemed to barely miss a field goal. The referee called it good and the Packers went on to win the game in overtime. The error precipitated changes to the rules: the NFL decided two referees would judge future field goals, and that the uprights should be raised by ten feet. In 1968 the Colts returned with the continued leadership of Unitas and Shula and went on to win the Colts' third NFL Championship and made an appearance in Super Bowl III. In 1968, Unitas was injured and replaced by Earl Morrall who became the league's MVP.

==== 1968–1972: Merger and Super Bowl V ====
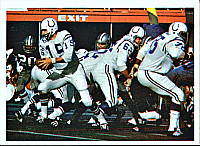
The Colts against Dallas in their first Super Bowl championship (V)

Leading up to the Super Bowl and following the 34–0 trouncing of the Cleveland Browns in the NFL Championship, many were calling the 1968 Colts team one of the "greatest pro football teams of all time" and were favored by 18 points against their counterparts from the American Football League, the New York Jets. The Colts were stunned by the Jets, who won the game 16–7 in the first Super Bowl victory for the young AFL. The result of the game surprised many in the sports media as Joe Namath and Matt Snell led the Jets to the Super Bowl victory under head coach Weeb Ewbank, who had previously won two NFL Championships with the Colts.

Rosenbloom of the Colts, Art Modell of the Browns, and Art Rooney of the Pittsburgh Steelers agreed to have their teams join the ten AFL teams in the AFC as part of the AFL–NFL merger in 1970. Rosenbloom hired AFL expert and hugely successful General Manager Don Klosterman who was the architect of both the KC Chiefs' Super Bowl '60s victory teams, the Oilers turnaround from bottom dweller to division champion in '67, and the original Chargers' personnel man whose teams took 2nd the first two years in the new AFL and won the AFL in 1963. The Colts immediately went on a rampage in the new league, as new head coach Don McCafferty led the 1970 team to an 11–2–1 regular-season record, winning the AFC East title. In the first round of the NFL Playoffs, the Colts beat the Cincinnati Bengals 17–0; one week later in the first-ever AFC Championship Game, they beat the Oakland Raiders 27–17. Baltimore went on to win the first post-merger Super Bowl (Super Bowl V), defeating the NFC's Dallas Cowboys 16–13 on a Jim O'Brien field goal with five seconds left to play. The victory gave the Colts their fourth NFL championship and first Super Bowl victory. Following the championship, the Colts returned to the playoffs in 1971, winning their opening playoff game against the Browns 20–3, but lost in the second AFC Championship Game in Miami 21–0.

==== 1972–1976: Bob Irsay arrives and “Shake n’ Bake” ====
Citing friction with the City of Baltimore and the local press, Rosenbloom traded the Colts franchise to Robert Irsay on July 13, 1972, and received the Los Angeles Rams in return. Under the new ownership, the Colts did not reach the postseason for three consecutive seasons after 1971, and after the 1972 season, starting quarterback and legend Johnny Unitas was traded to the San Diego Chargers. Following Unitas' departure, the Colts made the playoffs three consecutive seasons from 1975 to 1977, losing in the divisional round each time. The Colts' 1977 playoff loss in double overtime against the Oakland Raiders was famous in that it was the last playoff game for the Colts in Baltimore and is also known for the Ghost to the Post play. These consecutive playoff teams featured 1976 NFL Most Valuable Player Bert Jones at quarterback and an outstanding defensive line, nicknamed the "Sack Pack."

==== 1976–1983: Last days ====
Following this middle 1970s success, the Colts suffered a string of disappointing seasons, often finishing in last place in their division. Attendances began to dwindle in the early 1970s and remained that way for the rest of the team's tenure in Baltimore.

The Colts endured nine consecutive losing seasons beginning in 1978. In 1981, the Colts defense allowed an NFL-record 533 points, set an all-time record for fewest sacks (13), and also set a modern record for fewest punt returns (12). The following year, the offense collapsed, including a game against the Buffalo Bills where the Colts' offense did not cross mid-field the entire game. The Colts finished 0–8–1 in the strike-shortened 1982 season, thereby earning the right to select Stanford quarterback John Elway with the first overall pick. Both Elway and Southern Methodist running back Eric Dickerson – who was expected to be and was the second pick in the draft – flatly refused to play for the Colts. Using his leverage as a draftee of the New York Yankees, Elway forced a trade to the Denver Broncos. Behind an improved defense the team finished 7–9 in 1983, but that would prove their last season in Baltimore.

=== Move to Indianapolis ===
The city of Indianapolis, Indiana, made an offer for the Colts franchise to move there. Baltimore was unsuccessful at persuading them to stay, so the city government attempted to get the state legislature to condemn the Colts franchise and give ownership to another group that would promise to keep the Colts in Baltimore. Oakland, California, had just had some success in court trying the same tactic with the Oakland Raiders. Under the threat of eminent domain from the city of Baltimore, the franchise moved to Indianapolis in the middle of the night on March 29, 1984.

The city of Baltimore did not give up and sued to condemn the franchise anyway and seize ownership. Baltimore did not prevail in court, but eventually acquired a new NFL team in 1996 with the establishment of the Baltimore Ravens following the Cleveland Browns relocation controversy.

Many former Colts players were infuriated by the move. Among the most notable was Johnny Unitas, who opted to cut all ties with his former team after the incident. Unitas aligned himself with the Ravens when they moved to Baltimore, and a statue of him was placed outside of M&T Bank Stadium. On the other hand, Colts owner Jim Irsay held a reunion for the 1975 AFC East champion Baltimore Colts in Indianapolis at Lucas Oil Stadium in 2009. 39 of the 53 members of that team attended the ceremony, including Bert Jones, Lydell Mitchell, and Mike Curtis.

== Continuity ==
The NFL treats the Baltimore Colts and the Indianapolis Colts (including logos, history, and records) as one continuous franchise since 1953. Despite this, many former Baltimore Colts players, led by Johnny Unitas, disowned the Colts franchise after the move to Indianapolis, instead choosing to remain loyal to the City of Baltimore. These former players embraced the new Baltimore Ravens franchise when it arrived in Baltimore in 1996. The Ravens do claim the history of the Baltimore Colts as part of their own and have added the Baltimore Colt Hall of Famers to the Baltimore Ravens Ring of Honor. The Ravens officially have no retired numbers, but out of respect for Unitas, only quarterback Scott Mitchell has worn the number 19, which he did in his lone season in Baltimore in 1999. The Baltimore Colts Marching Band, which continued to operate after the Colts moved, became Baltimore's Marching Ravens.

On the other hand, there have been many former Baltimore Colts players who have embraced the franchise as continuous, from Baltimore to Indianapolis. In 2009, Jim Irsay held a reunion of his favorite Colts team ever, the 1975 AFC East champions. Thirty-nine of the 50 players on that roster attended the reunion at Lucas Oil Stadium, including quarterback Bert Jones and running back Lydell Mitchell. Also, on February 5, 2012, at Super Bowl XLVI, Hall-of-Fame Baltimore Colts wide receiver Raymond Berry carried the Vince Lombardi Trophy to midfield to present it to the New York Giants, who had just defeated the New England Patriots. He was given the honor due to the game being played at Lucas Oil Stadium, where the Colts have played since 2008.

Although the retired numbers of the Indianapolis Colts officially includes Unitas and others dating back to the Baltimore days, the Indianapolis Colts Ring of Honor currently only includes players who have played in Indianapolis, with the exception of Chris Hinton, who played for the Baltimore Colts in his rookie season in 1983.

== Records ==
=== Season-by-season ===
NFL champions (1920–1969)	Super Bowl champions (1970–present)	Conference champions	Division champions	Wild card berth	One-game playoff berth

Season	Team	League	Conference	Division	Regular season^{[a]}				Postseason results	Awards^{[b]}^{[c]}
Season	Team	League	Conference	Division	Finish	Won	Lost	Ties	Postseason results	Awards^{[b]}^{[c]}
Baltimore Colts
1953	1953	NFL	Western	—	5th	3	9	0		
1954	1954	NFL	Western	—	6th	3	9	0		
1955	1955	NFL	Western	—	4th	5	6	1		Alan Ameche (OROY)
1956	1956	NFL	Western	—	4th	5	7	0		Lenny Moore (OROY)
1957	1957	NFL	Western	—	3rd	7	5	0		
1958	1958	NFL	Western	—	1st	9	3	0	Won NFL Championship (1) (Giants) 23–17	Weeb Ewbank (COY)
1959	1959	NFL	Western	—	1st	9	3	0	Won NFL Championship (2) (Giants) 31–16	
1960	1960	NFL	Western	—	4th	6	6	0		
1961	1961	NFL	Western	—	3rd	8	6	0		
1962	1962	NFL	Western	—	4th	7	7	0		
1963	1963	NFL	Western	—	3rd	8	6	0		
1964	1964	NFL	Western	—	1st	12	2	0	Lost NFL Championship (Browns) 27–0	Johnny Unitas (MVP); Don Shula (COY)
1965	1965	NFL	Western	—	2nd	10	3	1	Lost Conference Playoff Game (Packers) 13–10	
1966	1966	NFL	Western	—	2nd	9	5	0		
1967^{[e]}	1967	NFL	Western	Coastal	2nd	11	1	2		Johnny Unitas (MVP); Don Shula (COY)
1968	1968	NFL	Western	Coastal	1st	13	1	0	Won Divisional Playoffs (Vikings) 24–14; Won NFL Championship (Browns) 34–0; Lost Super Bowl III (Jets) 16–7	Earl Morrall (MVP); Don Shula (COY)
1969	1969	NFL	Western	Coastal	2nd	8	5	1		
1970	1970	NFL	AFC	East	1st	11	2	1	Won Divisional Playoffs (Bengals) 17–0; Won Conference Championship (Raiders) 27–17; Won Super Bowl V (3) (Cowboys) 16–13	Johnny Unitas (WP MOY)
1971	1971	NFL	AFC	East	2nd	10	4	0	Won Divisional Playoffs (Browns) 20–3; Lost Conference Championship (Dolphins) 21–0	
1972	1972	NFL	AFC	East	3rd	5	9	0		
1973	1973	NFL	AFC	East	4th	4	10	0		
1974	1974	NFL	AFC	East	5th	2	12	0		
1975	1975	NFL	AFC	East	1st^{[f]}	10	4	0	Lost Divisional Playoffs (Steelers) 28–10	Ted Marchibroda (COY)
1976	1976	NFL	AFC	East	1st^{[g]}	11	3	0	Lost Divisional Playoffs (Steelers) 40–14	Bert Jones (MVP, OPOY)
1977	1977	NFL	AFC	East	1st^{[h]}	10	4	0	Lost Divisional Playoffs (Raiders) 37–31 (2OT)^{[i]}	
1978	1978	NFL	AFC	East	5th	5	11	0		
1979	1979	NFL	AFC	East	5th	5	11	0		
1980	1980	NFL	AFC	East	4th	7	9	0		
1981	1981	NFL	AFC	East	4th	2	14	0		
1982	1982	NFL	AFC	^{[j]}	14th	0	8	1		
1983	1983	NFL	AFC	East	4th	7	9	0		Vernon Leroy Maxwell (DROY)

=== All-time records ===
Statistic	Wins	Losses	Ties	Win%
Baltimore Colts regular season record (1953–1983)	222	194	7	.533
Baltimore Colts post-season record (1953–1983)	8	7	—	.533
All-time regular and post-season record	230	201	7	.533

=== Retired numbers ===
Includes players that only played in Baltimore

Baltimore Colts retired numbers
No.	Player	Position	Years played
19	Johnny Unitas	QB	1956–1972
22	Buddy Young	RB	1953–1955
24	Lenny Moore	HB	1956–1967
70	Art Donovan	DT	1953–1961
77	Jim Parker	OL	1957–1967
82	Raymond Berry	WR	1955–1967
89	Gino Marchetti	DE	1953–1966

=== Pro Football Hall of Famers ===
Baltimore Colts Hall of Famers
Players
No.	Name	Positions	Seasons	Inducted	No.	Name	Positions	Seasons	Inducted
82	Raymond Berry	WR	1955–1967	1973	24	Lenny Moore	HB	1956–1967	1975
70	Art Donovan	DT	1953–1961	1968	77	Jim Parker	OL	1957–1967	1973
83	Ted Hendricks	LB	1969–1973	1990	34	Joe Perry	FB	1961–1962	1969
88	John Mackey	TE	1963–1971	1992	19	Johnny Unitas	QB	1956–1972	1979
89	Gino Marchetti	DE	1953–1964; 1966	1972					
Coaches and executives
Name		Positions	Tenure	Inducted	Notes				
Weeb Ewbank		Coach	1954–1962	1978					
Mike McCormack		Coach	1980–1981	1984	Inducted for playing Offensive tackle				
Don Shula		Coach	1963–1969	1997	Shula was also a defensive back for Baltimore (1953–1956)				

== Notes ==
- ^{a} The Finish, Won, Lost, and Ties columns list regular season results and exclude any postseason play. Regular season and postseason results are combined only at the bottom of the list.
- ^{b} All regular season MVPs listed are the Associated Press MVP. For the full list of other MVPs see National Football League Most Valuable Player Award.
- ^{c} All Coach of the Year Awards listed are the Associated Press award. For the full list of other coaching awards see National Football League Coach of the Year Award.
- ^{d} This game would be later known as The Greatest Game Ever Played.
- ^{e} The 1967 NFL season marks the first season in the league's history where the league was divided into two conferences which were subdivided into two divisions. Up to 1967, the league was either divided into two divisions, two conferences, or neither.
- ^{f} The Colts and Dolphins finished tied. However, the Colts finished ahead of Miami in the AFC East based on a head-to-head sweep (2–0).
- ^{g} The Colts and Patriots finished tied. However, the Colts finished ahead of New England based on a better division record (7–1 to Patriots' 6–2).
- ^{h} The Colts and Dolphins finished tied. However, the Colts finished ahead of Miami based on better conference record (9–3 to Dolphins' 8–4).
- ^{i} The game involved the infamous Ghost to the Post play.
- ^{j} 1982 was a strike-shortened season so the league was divided up into two conferences instead of its normal divisional alignment.

== Training camp ==
- Western Maryland College (1953–1971)
- University of South Florida (1972)
- Towson State College (1973)
- McDonogh School (1974)
- Goucher College (1975–1983)
