= 1968 NFL playoffs =

American football tournament

- Dates: December 21–29, 1968
- Season: 1968
- Teams: 4
- Games played: 3
- NFL Championship Game site: Cleveland Municipal Stadium; Cleveland, Ohio
- Defending champions: Green Bay Packers (did not qualify)
- Champion: Baltimore Colts
- Runner-up: Cleveland Browns
NFL playoffs
← 1967	1969–70 →

The NFL playoffs following the 1968 NFL season determined who would represent the league in Super Bowl III.

== Tournament bracket ==
Within each conference, the two division winners qualified for the playoffs. In the start round, the Capitol and Century division winners played in the Eastern Conference Game, while the Coastal and Central division winners were in the Western Conference game. The winners of the two conference games advanced to the NFL Championship Game to compete for the NFL league title and the right to face the American Football League champion in the Super Bowl. The losers of the conference championship games played in the Playoff Bowl, a third place game held at the Orange Bowl in Miami, Florida.

Prior to 1975, the playoff sites rotated and were known prior to the start of the season. In 1968, the hosts were the Century and Coastal division winners for the conference championships (first round), and the Eastern Conference for the championship game. This effectively gave home field advantage to the Century Division winner, the Cleveland Browns (10–4). The 1967 and 1969 playoff hosts were Capitol, Central, and Western, respectively.

The rotation system forced the 12–2 Cowboys, champions of the Capitol Division, to play at the 10–4 Browns in the Eastern Conference playoff. In the Western Conference, the 13–1 Colts hosted the 8–6 Vikings; the home teams won both games in the opening round. The NFL championship game then saw Cleveland host Baltimore despite finishing with three fewer wins, although the Browns handed the Colts their lone regular season loss.

The three-time defending NFL champion Green Bay Packers finished at 6–7–1, third in the Central Division, and missed the postseason.

Conference championship
December 22, 1968 – Memorial Stadium
Minnesota	14
Baltimore	24
December 21, 1968 – Cleveland Stadium
Dallas	20
Cleveland	31

NFL Championship
December 29, 1968 – Cleveland Stadium
Baltimore	34
Cleveland	0
Playoff Bowl
January 5, 1969 – Orange Bowl
Minnesota	13
Dallas	17

== Conference championships ==
=== Saturday, December 21, 1968 ===
==== Eastern Conference: Cleveland Browns 31, Dallas Cowboys 20 ====
Cleveland Browns 31, Dallas Cowboys 20

Quarter	1	2	3	4	Total
Cowboys	7	3	3	7	20
Browns	3	7	14	7	31

at Cleveland Municipal Stadium, Cleveland, Ohio

- Date: December 21
- Game attendance: 81,497
- Referee: Pat Haggerty
- Pro-Football-Reference.com

Game information
Scoring
- CLE – Don Cockroft 38-yard field goal. Browns 3–0
- DAL – Chuck Howley 44-yard fumble return (Clark kick). Cowboys 7–3
- DAL – Mike Clark 16-yard field goal. Cowboys 10–3
- CLE – Leroy Kelly 45-yard pass from Bill Nelsen (Cockroft kick). Tied 10–10
- CLE – Dale Lindsey 27-yard interception return (Cockroft kick). Browns 17–10
- CLE – Leroy Kelly 35-yard run (Cockroft kick). Browns 24–10
- DAL – Mike Clark 47-yard field goal. Browns 24–13
- CLE – Ernie Green 2-yard run (Cockroft kick).Browns 31–13
- DAL – Walt Garrison 2-yard pass from Craig Morton (Clark kick). Browns 31–20

Despite the game's high score, this was actually a defensive struggle as both teams took advantage of each other's turnovers throughout the game. However, Cleveland emerged triumphant, overcoming a 10–3 first half deficit with 21 unanswered points.

Early in the first quarter, Mike Howell intercepted a pass from Don Meredith (who was playing in his final game) and returned it 20 yards to set up Don Cockroft's 38-yard field goal. Dallas took the lead later on, when linebacker Chuck Howley forced a fumble while sacking Browns quarterback Bill Nelsen and returned it 44 yards for a touchdown.

In the second quarter, Dallas increased their lead to 10–3 when an interception by Cowboys linebacker Dave Edwards led to Mike Clark's 16-yard field goal. However, the Browns tied the game with a last minute drive at the end of the half, moving the ball 85 yards in 4 plays and scoring on Nelsen's 45-yard touchdown pass to running back Leroy Kelly.

The Browns broke the game open on the first play of the second half when linebacker Dale Lindsey intercepted Meredith's sideline pass intended for Bob Hayes and raced 27 yards to the end zone, giving Cleveland a 17–10 lead. Then on the third play after the ensuing kickoff, Meredith threw a pass that bounced out of the grasp of Lance Rentzel and was picked off by defensive back Ben Davis, who returned the ball 3 yards to the Cowboys' 35. On the next play, Kelly took a pitch to the right and ran 35 yards for a touchdown, increasing Cleveland's lead to 24–10.

Dallas coach Tom Landry eventually replaced Meredith with Craig Morton, who managed to lead the team to a 47-yard field goal by Clark with 3:24 left in the 3rd quarter. But 24–13 was as close as the score would get. On Cleveland's next drive, Nelsen's play action pass to Paul Warfield picked up 39 yards and a first down on the Dallas 11-yard line. Three plays later, Ernie Green's 2-yard touchdown run gave them an insurmountable 31–13 4th quarter lead. All that remained in the game would be Morton's meaningless 2-yard touchdown pass to fullback Walt Garrison with a minute left in regulation. The final 31 seconds would never be reached because the game had to be called off, as Cleveland fans spilled out on the field for an early victory celebration.

Nelsen completed 13 of 25 passes for 203 yards and a touchdown, with one interception. Kelly rushed for 87 yards, caught two passes for 46 yards, and scored two touchdowns.

=== Sunday, December 22, 1968 ===
==== Western Conference: Baltimore Colts 24, Minnesota Vikings 14 ====
Baltimore Colts 24, Minnesota Vikings 14

Quarter	1	2	3	4	Total
Vikings	0	0	0	14	14
Colts	0	7	14	3	24

at Memorial Stadium, Baltimore, Maryland

- Date: December 22
- Game attendance: 60,238
- Referee: Jim Tunney
- Pro-Football-Reference.com

Game information
Scoring
- BAL – Mitchell 3 pass from Morrall (Michaels kick) BAL 7–0
- BAL – Mackey 49 pass from Morrall (Michaels kick) BAL 14–0
- BAL – Curtis 60 fumble return (Michaels kick) BAL 21–0
- MIN – Martin 1 pass from Kapp (Cox kick) BAL 21–7
- BAL – field goal Michaels 33 BAL 24–7
- MIN – Brown 7 pass from Kapp (Cox kick) BAL 24–14

Baltimore shut out the Vikings for the first three quarters and built a 21–0 lead to earn a trip to the NFL championship game.

The Colts got their first scoring chance early in the first quarter when defensive back Jerry Logan intercepted a pass from Vikings QB Joe Kapp and returned it 24 yards to the Minnesota 22. The Vikings defense managed to prevent a score when Earsell Mackbee recovered a fumble from running back Tom Matte, but after a punt, Colts quarterback Earl Morrall completed a 39-yard pass to Willie Richardson that gave the team a first down on the Vikings' 36-yard line. On the next play, Richardson made a leaping catch on the 3-yard line for a 33-yard gain. Minnesota managed to stuff two Colts rushing attempts, but on third down, Baltimore got on the board with Morrall's 3-yard touchdown pass to Tom Mitchell. This ended up being the only score of the half. The only other highlights would be an interception from each team, by Ed Sharockman and Bobby Boyd.

Colts kicker Lou Michaels missed a 33-yard field goal attempt early in the third quarter, but the Colts got the ball back with great field position at midfield after the Vikings punted. Then on the second play of the Colts' ensuing drive, Morrall threw a pass to tight end John Mackey, who broke ahead of linebacker Roy Winston, caught the ball and then raced past safeties Karl Kassulke and Paul Krause to score on a 49-yard touchdown completion, giving the Colts a 14–0 lead. Vikings returner Clint Jones gave his team a chance to get back in the game with a 35-yard kickoff return to the Colts' 42-yard line. However, on the second play of the possession, Bubba Smith plowed into Kapp as he was winding up to throw a pass, knocking the ball out of his hand and right into the arms of linebacker Mike Curtis, who returned the fumble 60 yards to the end zone.

Faced with a 21–0 deficit in the 4th quarter, Minnesota drove 77 yards, aided by two catches by Gene Washington for 27 yards and a 33-yard pass interference penalty on Lenny Lyles that gave them a first and goal on the Baltimore 1-yard line. After that, Kapp threw a 1-yard touchdown toss to tight end Bill Martin. However, a 33-yard field goal by Michaels quickly snuffed out the Vikings' hopes of a miracle comeback. All they could do with the remaining time was make the final score 24–14 when Kapp finished off a 73-yard drive with a 7-yard touchdown pass to running back Bill Brown with 4 seconds left on the clock.

Morrall completed 13 of 22 passes for 280 yards and two touchdowns, with 1 interception. Richardson caught 6 passes for 148 yards, while Mackey had 3 receptions for 92 yards and a touchdown. Kapp finished the day 26 of 44 for 287 yards and two touchdowns, with two interceptions. He was also the game's leading rusher with 10 carries for 52 yards. Washington caught 5 passes for 95 yards.

== NFL Championship Game: Baltimore Colts 34, Cleveland Browns 0 ==
Baltimore Colts 34, Cleveland Browns 0

Quarter	1	2	3	4	Total
Colts	0	17	7	10	34
Browns	0	0	0	0	0

at Cleveland Stadium, Cleveland, Ohio

- Date: December 29, 1968
- Game time: 2:35 p.m. EST
- Game weather: 27 °F (−3 °C), wind 22 mph (35 km/h), wind chill 13 °F (−11 °C), relative humidity 60%
- Game attendance: 78,410
- TV announcers (CBS): Jack Buck, Pat Summerall, Tom Brookshier
- Pro-Football-Reference.com

Game information
- First quarter
  - no scoring
- Second quarter
  - BAL – Lou Michaels 28-yard field goal. Colts 3–0
  - BAL – Tom Matte 1-yard rush (Michaels kick). Colts 10–0
  - BAL – Tom Matte 12-yard rush (Michaels kick). Colts 17–0
- Third quarter
  - BAL – Tom Matte 2-yard run (Michaels kick). Colts 24–0
- Fourth quarter
  - BAL – Lou Michaels 10-yard field goal. Colts 27–0
  - BAL – Timmy Brown 4-yard rush (Michaels kick). Colts 34–0

Top passers

- BAL – Earl Morrall – 11/25, 169 yards, 1 INT
- CLE – Bill Nelsen – 11/26, 132 yards, 2 INT

Top rushers

- BAL – Tom Matte – 17 rushes, 88 yards, 3 TD
- CLE – Leroy Kelly – 13 rushes, 28 yards

Top receivers

- BAL – Willie Richardson – 3 receptions, 78 yards
- CLE – Milt Morin – 3 receptions, 41 yards

Baltimore held Cleveland to just 173 total yards as they avenged their only regular season loss of the year, against the Browns, with a dominant shutout win. Cleveland crossed midfield only twice, just once in each half, and kicker Don Cockroft missed three field goal attempts.

Things actually started out promising for Cleveland. Browns defensive back Ben Davis wiped out a scoring chance for Baltimore on their opening drive when he intercepted a pass from Earl Morrall on the Cleveland 14-yard line. The Browns then drove to the Colts' 35-yard line, with Bill Nelsen completing passes to Paul Warfield and Milt Morin for gains of 16 and 22 yards. However, Nelsen was dropped for a 7-yard loss on first down by Fred Miller and Ordell Braase. He managed to lead the team back to the 35 by the time they got to 4th down, but Cockroft's 42-yard field goal attempt was blocked by defensive tackle Bubba Smith. The Colts then took over and drove to a 3–0 lead on a 28-yard field goal by Lou Michaels.

In the second quarter, Baltimore completely took over the game. Colts running back Tom Matte scored on a 1-yard touchdown run, giving the Colts a 10–0 lead. Later on, the Colts seemed to blow a scoring chance when tight end John Mackey lost a fumble that was recovered by Erich Barnes and returned 9 yards to the Browns' 23. But on the next play, linebacker Mike Curtis intercepted a pass from Nelsen on the 33, leading to Matte's 12-yard touchdown run that gave Baltimore a 17–0 lead going into halftime.

After halftime, Cleveland forced a punt and got the ball on their own 40, where they proceeded to drive to the Colts' 38. But once again their drive stalled and Cockroft missed a 50-yard field goal attempt. He got another chance as a result of a penalty on the play, but missed again from 45 yards on his next attempt. After an exchange of punts, Baltimore got the ball on the Cleveland 48 and drove to a 24–0 lead on Matte's third touchdown of the day. Meanwhile, Nelsen was benched and replaced by Frank Ryan, but this did nothing to improve Cleveland's misfortunes. On his first play, he fumbled the snap, and linebacker Don Shinnick recovered the ball on the Browns' 20-yard line, leading to Michaels' second field goal, giving Baltimore a 27–0 lead on the second play of the 4th quarter. Ryan completed just 2 of 6 pass attempts for the rest of the game, while Colts running back Timmy Brown scored the final points on a 4-yard touchdown run.

Matte, an Ohio native and former quarterback at Ohio State, was the sole offensive star of the game, rushing for 88 yards and 3 touchdowns, while also catching 2 passes for 15 yards.
