= Charles Leigh (American football) =

American football player (1945–2006)

Charles Leigh Sr.
No. 25, 15, 23
- Position: Running back

Personal information
- Born: October 29, 1945; Halifax, Virginia, U.S.
- Died: October 26, 2006 (aged 60); Albany, New York, U.S.
- Listed height: 5 ft 11 in (1.80 m)
- Listed weight: 206 lb (93 kg)

Career information
- High school: Albany (Albany, New York)
- College: None
- NFL draft: 1965: undrafted

Career history
- Pittsburgh Steelers (1965); Pennsylvania Mustangs (1965); Orlando Panthers (1966); Philadelphia Bulldogs (1966); Norfolk Neptunes (1967); Cleveland Browns (1968); New Jersey Jays (1969); Cleveland Browns (1969); San Francisco 49ers (1970); Ottawa Rough Riders (1970); Miami Dolphins (1971–1974); Green Bay Packers (1974)

Awards and highlights
- 2× Super Bowl champion (VII, VIII); COFL champion (1966)

Career NFL statistics
- Rushing yards: 372
- Rushing average: 5.2
- Receptions: 9
- Return yards: 1,450
- Total touchdowns: 2
- Stats at Pro Football Reference

Charles Irving "Charlie" Leigh Sr. (October 29, 1945 – October 26, 2006) was a National Football League (NFL) running back. He was the first and only NFL player to be signed out of high school. He is best known for backing up Larry Csonka and returning kicks for the Miami Dolphins' back to back Super Bowl champions in the 1972 and 1973 seasons. He also played for the Cleveland Browns and Green Bay Packers. He played a total of six seasons in the NFL.

== Early life ==
Leigh attended Albany High School in Albany, where he was a standout athlete in football and basketball. As a senior, he led his football team to an undefeated season.

== Professional career ==
In 1965, the Pittsburgh Steelers signed Leigh as an undrafted free agent, after then commissioner Pete Rozelle made a special ruling, allowing him to become the first and only NFL player to be signed directly out of high school. Charlie was only 19 years old when he signed with the Steelers. He was listed in the pre-season programs and even got as far as the 1965 media guide. Realizing Charlie needed development Pittsburgh moved him to the Pennsylvania Mustangs of the NAFL which was a minor league team. In Charlies first game with the Mustangs he returned a kickoff for 95 yards and touchdown. In 1966 Charlie went to the Continental Football League. He started the season with the Orlando Panthers where he rushed for 92 yards and returned punts. Half way through the season he was traded to the Philadelphia Bulldogs where he rushed for 192 yards, scored 2 touchdowns and returned kicks for 169 yards. Charlie also won his first Championship with the Bulldogs. In 1967 Charlie went to play for the Norfolk Neptunes where he rushed for 452 yards and 8 touchdowns. Charlie also led the team in kickoff and punt returns while leading them to the conference championship.

Leigh was a part of the taxi squad of the Cleveland Browns from 1966 to 1967, while also playing for the Panthers. He made his NFL debut in 1968, after making the team. As a running back, he rushed 23 times for 144 yards, a 6.3 yards per carry average, and he scored two touchdowns. One touchdown, scored against the Baltimore Colts, was ranked 69th among the 100 greatest rushing touchdowns in NFL history. His number of carries, total rushing yards and yards per carry average all proved to be career highs. He was also used extensively as a kick returner. He returned 14 kickoffs for 322 yards, a 23.0 yard per return average. And he returned 14 punts for 76 yards, a 5.4-yard per return average. Leigh led the Browns and placed 13th in the NFL in both yards per kickoff return and yards per punt return in 1968. He was released on August 29, 1969.

On September 1, 1969, he was claimed off waivers by the San Francisco 49ers. He would later be cut and re-signed by the Browns, but received little time at running back and did not carry the ball the entire season, although he did catch two passes. He did return five punts for 18 yards and two kickoffs for six yards that season. He was cut before the start of the 1970 season.

In 1970, he played 8 games for the Ottawa Rough Riders of the Canadian Football League, before being released.

In 1971, he was signed by the Miami Dolphins after a tryout. That season, he rushed five times for 15 yards and returned just four kickoffs for 99 yards, although he appeared in all 14 games. He couldn't play in Super Bowl VI against the Dallas Cowboys, because of a separated right shoulder he suffered in the AFC championship game against the Baltimore Colts.

Leigh became the primary punt returner for the famous 1972 Miami Dolphins team that had a perfect season and won Super Bowl VII. Leigh returned 22 punts for 210 yards and a 9.5-yard average for the 1972 Dolphins. The 22 punts returned ranked 5th in the NFL that season, and the 210 yards and 9.5 average each ranked 6th in the NFL that season. Leigh also returned six kickoff 153 yards, a 25.5-yard average, and rushed 21 times for 79 yards, a 3.8-yard average. Leigh got to play in Miami's 14–7 Super Bowl victory over the Washington Redskins, but did not have any carries or returns.

Leigh had one of his most productive seasons in 1973 for the Dolphins, another Super Bowl championship team. Leigh rushed 22 times for 134 yards for a 6.1 yards per carry average with one touchdown. His yards per carry average was second on the team to Mercury Morris' league leading 6.4. He also returned nine kickoffs for 251 yards, for a 27.9 average that would have ranked 6th in the NFL had he had enough returns to qualify for the league leaders. He also had nine punt returns for 64 yards, for a 7.1 average.

In 1974, he played one game for the Dolphins before being released. On September 26, 1974, he was claimed off waivers by the Green Bay Packers. He appeared in 10 games, returned 9 kickoffs, for 201 yards and a 22.3-yard average. He also carried the ball one time for the Packers but did not gain any yards. He wasn't re-signed after the season.

== Career stats ==
For his career, Leigh rushed 72 times for 372 yards, a 5.2 yards per carry average and two touchdowns. The 5.2 yards per carry average was better than several of his more celebrated teammates, including Hall of Famer Leroy Kelly (4.2), Hall of Famer Larry Csonka (4.3), 3 time Pro Bowler Mercury Morris (5.1) and 2 time Pro Bowler Jim Kiick (3.7). He also returned 46 kickoffs for 1082 yards and a 23.5 yards per return average, and returned 50 punts for 368 yards and a 7.4 yards per return average.

== Personal life ==
Leigh died of lung cancer on October 26, 2006.
