= Leroy Kelly =

American football player (born 1942)

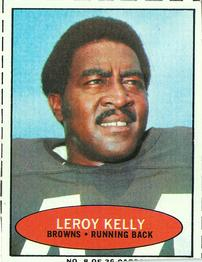
- Kelly with the Cleveland Browns in 1971

No. 44
- Position: Running back

Personal information
- Born: May 20, 1942 (age 84); Philadelphia, Pennsylvania, U.S.
- Listed height: 6 ft 0 in (1.83 m)
- Listed weight: 202 lb (92 kg)

Career information
- High school: Simon Gratz (Philadelphia)
- College: Morgan State (1960-1963)
- NFL draft: 1964: 8th round, 110th overall pick

Career history
- Cleveland Browns (1964–1973); Chicago Fire (1974)

Awards and highlights
- NFL champion (1964); 3× First-team All-Pro (1966–1968); Second-team All-Pro (1969); 6× Pro Bowl (1966–1971); 2× NFL rushing yards leader (1967, 1968); 3× NFL rushing touchdowns leader (1966–1968); NFL scoring leader (1968); NFL 1960s All-Decade Team; Bert Bell Award (1968); Cleveland Browns Ring of Honor

Career NFL statistics
- Rushing yards: 7,274
- Rushing average: 4.2
- Receptions: 190
- Receiving yards: 2,281
- Return yards: 2,774
- Total touchdowns: 90
- Stats at Pro Football Reference
- Pro Football Hall of Fame

Leroy Kelly (born May 20, 1942) is an American former professional football player who was a running back for the Cleveland Browns of the National Football League (NFL) from 1964 to 1973. He was inducted into the Pro Football Hall of Fame in 1994. Kelly was selected to play in the Pro Bowl six consecutive seasons (1966 to 1971), and was named a starter in his first three Pro Bowls. He was named a first- or second-team All-Pro five times. He finished in the top-four in NFL Most Valuable Player voting in three consecutive seasons. He received the Maxwell Football Club's Bert Bell Award for NFL 1968 Player of the Year. He was selected to the NFL's 1960s All-Decade Team.

Kelly led the NFL in total rushing yards in 1967 and 1968, after being second to Gale Sayers in 1966. He led the NFL in rushing touchdowns from 1966 to 1968, in rushing average in 1966 and 1967, and in total yards from scrimmage in 1967 and 1968. The Browns were NFL champions in 1964, and made the NFL playoffs seven of his ten years with the team. After he became a starter in 1966, the Browns never had a losing season.

He attended Morgan State College (now Morgan State University), and was on the 1962 CIAA championship football team. He was co-Most Valuable Player in the 1963 Orange Blossom Classic. Kelly was inducted into Morgan State's Hall of Fame in 1977. His brother Pat Kelly played Major League Baseball for 15 seasons.

== Early life ==
Kelly was born in Philadelphia, Pennsylvania, on May 20, 1942. His parents Orvin and Argie (Watson) Kelly, came from South Carolina to Philadelphia in the mid-1920s. They had nine children, two of whom died of rheumatic fever in 1940 before Kelly was born. He grew up in Nicetown, in North Philadelphia.

He attended Simon Gratz High School in Philadelphia. During his Hall of Fame acceptance speech, Kelly singled out his high school coach, Louis E. DeVicaris, for getting him to college. Kelly attended Morgan State University in Baltimore, a leading historically black college and university (HBCU). He is considered by many knowledgeable Philadelphia sports writers to be one of the top 10 professional athletes ever to have come out of Philadelphia's high school leagues.

At Gratz, Kelly lettered in football, basketball, and baseball. In football, he played quarterback and middle linebacker, and was a placekicker, punter, and kick returner as well. He won the Philadelphia Public League scoring title as a senior. Kelly was team captain and won honorable mention on the Pennsylvania All-Star Team. He was also a star basketball player, as well as winning honors as a high school baseball player. He was voted the most outstanding athlete in his senior year; and was named all-city at quarterback and as a shortstop in baseball. Kelly's brother Pat Kelly, who became a Major League Baseball player, believed Kelly's best sport was baseball. As a baseball player, Kelly tried out for the Philadelphia Phillies and was invited back by the team, but felt he had a better future in football.

== College career ==
Kelly attended Morgan State College (now Morgan State University) from 1960 to 1963. College Football Hall of Fame coach, and fellow Philadelphian, Earl Banks coached Kelly at Morgan State, moving Kelly from quarterback to running back. He also played defensive back. In 1962, Kelly led Morgan State in rushing, scoring, and punting, and the team won the CIAA (Central Intercollegiate Athletic Association) Championship. In 1963, his senior year, Kelly was selected as one of the two Most Valuable Players in the Orange Blossom Classic. Kelly holds Morgan State records for touchdowns in a half (three against Delaware State in 1963), the longest scoring play from scrimmage (95 yards against Virginia State in 1962), and the longest punt return (67 yards against Delaware State in 1962). Kelly was inducted into Morgan State's Hall of Fame in 1977.

== Professional career ==
Kelly was selected 110th overall by the Browns in the eighth round of the 1964 NFL draft. Buddy Young, who was working for the NFL at the time, brought Kelly to the Browns' attention as a potential draft pick. When Kelly was in danger of being cut in training camp because an injury was limiting his play, Jim Brown, one of the greatest college and professional football players of all time, and the first person selected to the NFL's 100th Anniversary team, went to the head coach Blanton Collier and the team's trainer to convince them to give Kelly a week to heal; and Kelly's job was saved. Kelly moved up to become the Browns' featured running back after Jim Brown's retirement at the end of the 1965 season. The Browns would make the playoffs in seven of the 10 years Kelly played for them; and never had a losing season with him as a starting running back.

As a Cleveland rookie he was a key return specialist, averaging 24.3 yards per kickoff return and 19 yards per punt return, in contributing to the Browns' 1964 NFL championship season. He was backup running back behind featured fullback Jim Brown and blocking halfback Ernie Green, with only six rushing attempts that season. Kelly returned nine punts for 171 yards and 24 kickoffs for 582 yards that season. On October 25, 1964, he returned a punt 68 yards for a touchdown against the New York Giants. Browns' head coach Blanton Collier also found Kelly to be a vicious tackler on special teams in covering kick returns.

Hall of fame receiver Paul Warfield, who was the Browns' first draft pick in 1964, considered Kelly's kick returning that year a key to the team's championship success, and that Kelly's return ability and style generally caused a change in strategy around the league for kick returns. Instead of getting behind a blocking wall and then running toward the edges of the field to return kicks up the sidelines, Kelly would take a quick step to the left or right after catching the ball and then run up the middle of the field on his returns. Along with Kelly and Warfield, the 1964 NFL draft produced the most Hall of Fame players of any draft (10); plus coach Bill Parcells (who was selected in the seventh round of that draft).

In 1965, Kelly started one game, with 37 rushing attempts for 139 yards, and nine receptions for 122 yards on the season. He returned 17 punts for 265 yards (15.6 yards per return), and 24 kickoffs for 621 yards (25.9 yards per return). On November 21, Kelly returned a punt 67 yards for a touchdown against the Dallas Cowboys; and the following week returned a punt 56 yards for a touchdown against the Pittsburgh Steelers. Jim Brown told Browns' head coach Blanton Collier that Collier need not worry about Brown's retirement before the 1966 season because Kelly would be a great replacement and a top NFL running back. When Jim Brown told Browns' guard John Wooten he was retiring, Wooten responded "'What's that going to do to us'"?, and Jim Brown responded "'Kelly's ready. You guys will be all right'".

When Brown retired before the 1966 season, Kelly became a starter at running back. For the next three years, he rushed for over 1,000 yards each year, with a total of 3,585 yards; led the NFL in each of those seasons in rushing touchdowns; and was first or second in total rushing yards during those three seasons.

In 1966, Kelly led the NFL in rushing yards per attempt (5.5), rushing touchdowns (15), total rushing and receiving touchdowns (16), and longest run (70 yards); and was second in the NFL in total rushing yards (1,141) and total yards from scrimmage (1,507) to future Hall of Fame running back Gale Sayers. He rushed for over 100 yards in six games that season, and rushed for three touchdowns in a single game twice that year. Kelly also returned 13 punts for 104 yards, and 19 kickoffs for 403 yards; and was second in the NFL to Sayers in all-purpose yards (2,014). Kelly was fourth in the 1966 NFL Most Valuable Player Voting, and was selected to play in the Pro Bowl for the first time, as a starter. The Associated Press (AP), Newspaper Enterprise Association (NEA), Pro Football Writers of America, and United Press International (UPI) all selected Kelly first-team All-Pro that season.

In 1967, Kelly led the NFL in total rushing yards (1,205), total rushing attempts (235), rushing touchdowns (11), yards per rushing attempt (5.1), rushing yards per game (86.1), and total yards from scrimmage (1,487). Kelly rushed for 163 yards and two touchdowns against Washington on November 26, and had another 44 yards receiving; and was named the Associated Press' NFL Offensive Player of the Week. This was the most rushing yards he had gained in a single game up to that time. Kelly also served as the team's reserve punter in 1967 behind Gary Collins; and had 10 punts for 407 yards that season.

He was selected to play in the Pro Bowl again for the 1967 season; once again as a starter. Kelly was third in the NFL's Most Valuable Player voting; behind only Johnny Unitas and Deacon Jones. The AP, NEA, and UPI all named him first-team All-Pro again in 1967. He returned only nine punts and five kickoffs that season. In the Browns' divisional round loss to the Dallas Cowboys in the 1967 NFL playoffs, Kelly had 96 yards rushing in 15 attempts, and 39 receiving yards.

After his excellent play in 1966, Kelly sought to double his salary of $20,000, and the Browns refused his demands. Along with some other Browns' players, he reported late to training camp in 1967. After being fined, Kelly decided to play out his contract option in 1967 at a 10 percent pay reduction. After his All-Pro 1967 season, Browns' owner Art Modell accepted that Kelly had gambled on his contract and won. In 1968, Kelly signed a four-year contract with the Browns for $250,000.

In 1968, Kelly again led the NFL in total rushing yards (1,239), rushing attempts (248), rushing touchdowns (16), and total yards from scrimmage (1,536). He also led the NFL in total touchdowns (20) and points scored (120). He scored at least one touchdown in 12 different games, and had two-or-more touchdowns rushing and/or receiving in six different games; setting franchise records. He also threw a 34-yard touchdown pass to Paul Warfield on November 24, to go along with two rushing touchdowns and 108 total rushing yards; and was named the Associated Press' Offensive Player of the Week in the NFL. He rushed for over 100 yards in seven games (and 99 yards in another). Kelly had four rushing touchdowns in a December 1 game against the Giants; and rushed for 174 yards in a November 3 game against the San Francisco 49ers.

Kelly was second in NFL Most Valuable Player voting to Earl Morrall in 1968, and was selected to the Pro Bowl for the third consecutive season; once more as a starter. He was named first-team All-NFL/AFL by the Pro Football Writers and Pro Football Weekly, and was named first-team All-Pro by the AP, NEA, UPI, and Pro Football Weekly. He returned only one kickoff and one punt that season. In the divisional round of the 1968 NFL playoffs against the Dallas Cowboys, Kelly rushed for 87 yards with a 35-yard touchdown run, and also caught a 45-yard touchdown pass in the Browns' 31–20 victory. He was held to 55 total yards from scrimmage in the Browns' loss to the Baltimore Colts in the 1968 NFL Championship Game.

Kelly played in three more Pro Bowls, following the 1969, 1970, and 1971 seasons. He earned first-team All-Pro honors from the NEA in 1969 and 1971. He was named a second-team All-Pro by the AP, Pro Football Weekly, and UPI in 1969, and by the Pro Football Writers in 1971. In 1969, the NEA also named him first-team All-NFL/AFL and the Pro Football Writers and Hall of Fame named him second-team All-NFL/AFL.

In 1969, Kelly was second in the NFL in rushing touchdowns (nine) and seventh in total rushing yards (817) and yards from scrimmage (1,084). In the Browns' divisional round win over the Dallas Cowboys in the 1969-70 NFL playoffs, Kelly had 66 rushing yards with one touchdown and 10 receiving yards. In the 1969 NFL Championship Game, he had 80 yards rushing and 17 receiving yards in the Browns loss to the Minnesota Vikings.

In 1971, he was second in the NFL in rushing touchdowns (10), fifth in all-purpose yards (1,420), eighth in total rushing yards (865), and ninth in yards from scrimmage (1,117). He became the Browns' primary punt returner again, with 30 returns for 292 yards (9.7 yards per return) second best in the NFL that season in punt return yards and average; and Kelly had the longest punt return in the NFL that season (74 yards). He had 49 rushing yards and 24 receiving yards in the Browns' divisional round playoff loss to the Colts in 1971. In 1972, he started all 14 games, and had 1,015 total yards from scrimmage; including 811 rushing yards on 224 carries. In 1973, his final NFL season, Kelly started 13 games, but had only 389 rushing yards on 132 carries. The Browns waived Kelly in June 1974.

At the time his NFL career ended, Kelly had rushed for 7,274 yards (then fourth all-time to Jim Brown, Joe Perry, and Jim Taylor) and 74 touchdowns (then third all-time) on 1,727 carries for 4.2 yards per carry. He also caught 190 passes for 2,281 yards and 13 touchdowns. On special teams, he returned 94 punts for 990 yards and three touchdowns, and 76 kickoffs for 1,784 yards. Overall, he gained 12,330 all-purpose yards and scored 90 touchdowns. He was named All-Pro five times and to the Pro Bowl six times. He had 20 games rushing for more than 100 yards, and missed only four games due to injury during his career.

In game 12 of the 1970 season, he passed Bill Brown as the career rushing-yards leader among active players, a position he maintained until his retirement in 1974. Kelly also was a talented punt and kick returner, who averaged 10.5 yards per punt return and 23.5 yards per kick return for his career. He was the NFL's leading punt returner in 1965 and the AFC's top punt returner in 1971.

=== World Football League ===
Kelly tried out with the Oakland Raiders in 1974, but did not make the team. He ended his professional career with the Chicago Fire of the World Football League in 1974, rushing for 315 yards (4.1 average) and catching eight passes for 128 yards (16.0 average).

== Coaching career ==
After his retirement as an active player, he remained in the World Football League as the Philadelphia Bell's offensive backfield coach, joining two other Hall of Famers on that staff, former Green Bay Packers defensive backfield standouts Willie Wood (the first black head coach in pro football history) and fellow Philadelphian Herb Adderley (defensive coordinator). Adderley had grown up just five blocks from Kelley.

== Legacy and honors ==
Kelly has received the following honors, among others;

- Inducted into the Pro Football Hall of Fame (1994)
- One of 11 players from the 1964 NFL draft class later inducted into the Hall of Fame (10 as players), including his Browns' teammate Paul Warfield; a record for any one draft class
- Inducted into the Black College Football Hall of Fame (2013)
- Inducted into the Browns Ring of Honor (2010)
- Inducted into Morgan State University's Hall of Fame (1977)
- Member of the Philadelphia Sports Hall of Fame
- Winner of the Maxwell Football Club's Bert Bell Award for NFL Player of the Year (1968)
- Selected to the 1960s All-Decade Team
- Selected All-Pro five times (1966 to 1969, 1971)
- Played in six consecutive Pro Bowls (three as a starter from 1966 to 1968)

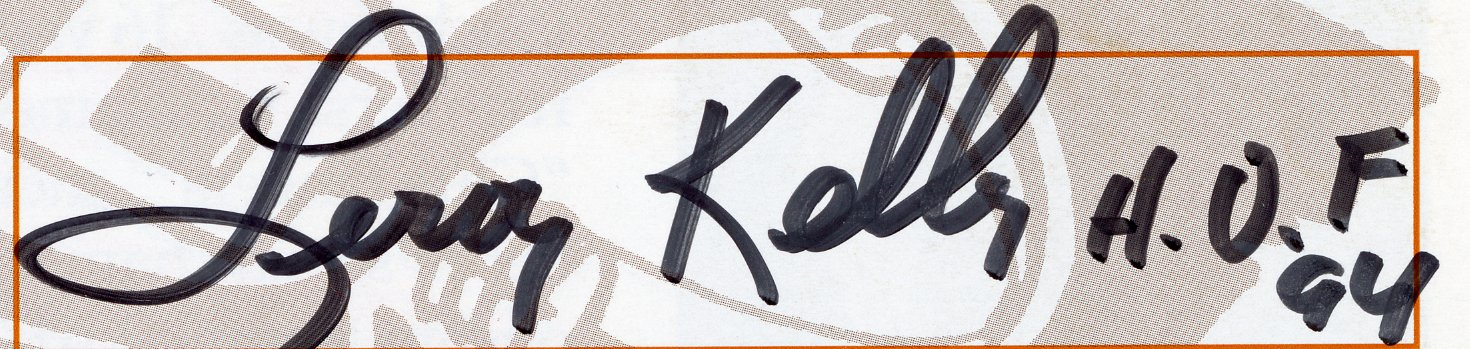

Cleveland sportswriter Chuck Heaton introduced Kelly at his Hall of Fame induction ceremony. Hall of Fame Philadelphia sportswriter Ray Didinger described Kelly as "an instinctive runner with a marvelous ability to change direction". At the time of Kelly's inclusion in the Hall of Fame in 1994, Didinger observed that an objective recognition of Kelly's own abilities and accomplishments had been hindered by comparisons to Jim Brown, whom Kelly had succeeded as the Browns' primary running back.

Cleveland guard John Wooten, who played with both Brown and Kelly, said of Kelly's 1994 Hall of Fame induction, "Had he not had Jim in front of him, he would have made it long ago'". Cleveland sportswriter and Pro Football Hall of Fame selector Tony Grossi said at the time, "If Kelly had played for a different team, or with the Browns in a different era, his career statistics would have merited instant election to the Hall". In 1994, Hall of Fame defensive back Herb Adderley, Kelly's contemporary in the NFL, said Kelly "'was probably the quickest running back coming off the ball in the history of the game'".

Kelly said his greatest thrill during his time as a player in professional football was not any of his own individual performances; but was in starting the one game in 1965 in the same backfield next to Jim Brown. In later describing his state of mind in taking over for Brown as the team's primary running back in 1966, Kelly said "'I felt confident I could handle the job . . . I know Jim Brown was the greatest running back to ever play the game. I just didn't feel the pressure'". He attributed this in part, at least, to the Browns' excellent offensive line. He was not boastful as a player, and was known for a quiet humility. One of his offensive lineman, John Wooten, described Kelly as "'the most humble – capitalize humble – superstar you'll ever meet in your life'".

== Personal life ==
Pat Kelly, his younger brother, was an All-Star outfielder who played for five teams during a 15-year Major League Baseball career. Felicia Kelly, Kelly's only daughter, worked in the local news business for 20 years at Cleveland's ABC affiliate WEWS-TV. She worked in the engineering department, as a news source reporter, and hosted a half-hour entertainment show called "The Set". She is now an educator in the Cleveland Public School System. David Kelly, his eldest son, is sports anchor and reporter for KMSB-TV in Tucson, Arizona. Leroy Kelly II, his second son, played three years in the American Indoor Football League and one year overseas in the GFL Germany League, for the Kiel-Baltic Hurricanes. Leroy Kelly II was invited to two workouts with the Cleveland Browns and one with the Detroit Lions.

Kelly operated two Burger King franchises in Philadelphia in the 1980s, selling those businesses after being held up at gunpoint on three occasions; and once being locked in a freezer by robbers after one pointed a gun at him.

== NFL career statistics ==
Legend
	Won NFL Championship
	Led the league
**Bold**	Career high

Year	Team	Games		Rushing						Receiving					Fumbles	
Year	Team	GP	GS	Att	Yds	Avg	Y/G	Lng	TD	Rec	Yds	Avg	Lng	TD	Fum	FR
1964	CLE	**14**	0	6	12	2.0	0.9	5	0	0	0	0.0	0	0	0	0
1965	CLE	13	1	37	139	3.8	10.7	16	0	9	122	13.6	52	0	3	**2**
1966	CLE	**14**	**14**	209	1,141	**5.5**	81.5	**70**	15	**32**	**366**	11.4	40	1	1	0
1967	CLE	**14**	**14**	235	1,205	5.1	86.1	42	11	20	282	**14.1**	48	2	**7**	**2**
1968	CLE	**14**	**14**	**248**	**1,239**	5.0	**88.5**	65	**16**	22	297	13.5	**68**	**4**	6	1
1969	CLE	13	13	196	817	4.2	62.8	31	9	20	267	13.4	36	1	1	1
1970	CLE	13	13	206	656	3.2	50.5	33	6	24	311	13.0	55	2	3	1
1971	CLE	**14**	**14**	234	865	3.7	61.8	35	10	25	252	10.1	29	2	**7**	**2**
1972	CLE	**14**	**14**	224	811	3.6	57.9	18	4	23	204	8.9	28	1	4	1
1973	CLE	13	13	132	389	2.9	29.9	19	3	15	180	12.0	36	0	3	0
Career		136	110	1,727	7,274	4.2	53.5	70	74	190	2,281	12.0	68	13	35	10
