= 1968 Baltimore Colts season =

16th season in franchise history; first Super Bowl appearance and loss

- Owner: Carroll Rosenbloom
- General manager: Harry Hulmes
- Head coach: Don Shula
- Home stadium: Memorial Stadium

Results
- Record: 13–1
- Division place: 1st NFL Coastal
- Playoffs: Won Western Conference Championship Game (vs. Vikings) 24–14; Won NFL Championship (at Browns) 34–0; Lost Super Bowl III (vs. Jets) 7–16

The 1968 Baltimore Colts season was the 16th season for the team in the National Football League (NFL). Led by sixth-year head coach Don Shula, they finished the regular season with a record of 13 wins and 1 loss, and won the Western Conference's Coastal division.

The previous season, the Colts finished 11–1–2, tied for the best in the league, but were excluded from the playoffs. They lost a tiebreaker with the Los Angeles Rams for the Coastal Division title in 1967; the other three teams in the NFL postseason, all division winners, had nine wins each.

The Colts finished the 1968 regular season with the team's defense having allowed just 144 points — tying the NFL record for a 14-game season.

In 1968, Baltimore won the Western Conference playoff game against the Minnesota Vikings and the NFL Championship Game in a shutout of the Cleveland Browns, but then lost to the New York Jets of the American Football League in Super Bowl III. Hall of Fame quarterback Johnny Unitas had been injured during the pre-season, so Earl Morrall led the offense. He would finish the season as the league leader in touchdown passes with 26. Shula decided to bring Unitas back in during the second half of the Super Bowl, to no avail.

After the upset, instead of championship rings, luxury watches were given to the team as a consolation prize to commemorate their NFL Championship victory over Cleveland.

== Offseason ==
=== NFL draft ===
Round	Pick	Player	Position	School/Club team
1	23	John Williams	Offensive tackle	Minnesota
2	50	Bob Grant	Linebacker	Wake Forest
3	78	Rich O'Hara	Wide receiver	Northern Arizona
4	107	Jim Duncan	Running back	Maryland-Eastern Shore
5	126	Paul Elzey	Linebacker	Toledo
7	188	Anthony Andrews	Running back	Hampton
8	216	Tommy Davis	Guard	Tennessee State
9	242	Terry Cole	Running back	Indiana
10	257	Ocie Austin	Free safety	Utah State
10	270	Ed Tomlin	Running back	Hampton
11	296	Bill Pickens	Guard	Houston
12	324	James Jackson	Offensive tackle	Jackson State
13	350	Howard Tennebar	Offensive tackle	Kent State
14	378	Charles Mitchell	Tight end	Alabama State
15	404	Jeff Beaver	Quarterback	North Carolina
16	432	Walt Blackledge	Wide receiver	San Jose State
17	458	Roy Pederson	Linebacker	State College of Iowa

=== Undrafted free agents ===
1968 undrafted free agents of note
Player	Position	College
Johnny Mata	Linebacker	North Texas State

== Personnel ==
=== Staff/Coaches ===
1968 Baltimore Colts staff
Front office: Owner/president and treasurer – Carroll Rosenbloom; General manager – Harry Hulmes; Coaching staff: Head coach – Don Shula; Offensive coaches: Receivers/offensive ends – Dick Bielski; Offensive backs – Don McCafferty; Offensive line coach – John Sandusky	Defensive coaches: Defensive coordinator/defensive line – Bill Arnsparger; Defensive backfield – Chuck Noll; Linebackers coach – Don Shula

=== Roster ===
1968 Baltimore Colts roster
Quarterbacks (QB): 15 Earl Morrall; 19 Johnny Unitas; 16 Jim Ward; Running backs (RB): 2 Timmy Brown; 34 Terry Cole; 45 Jerry Hill; 41 Tom Matte; 26 Preston Pearson; Wide receivers (WR): 80 Gail Cogdill; 25 Alex Hawkins; 28 Jimmy Orr; 27 Ray Perkins; 87 Willie Richardson; Tight ends (TE): 88 John Mackey; 84 Tom Mitchell	Offensive linemen (OL): 73 Sam Ball T; 50 Bill Curry C; 61 Cornelius Johnson G; 62 Glenn Ressler G; 71 Dan Sullivan G; 52 Dick Szymanski C; 72 Bob Vogel T; 65 John Williams T; Defensive linemen (DL): 81 Ordell Braase DE; 85 Roy Hilton DE; 76 Fred Miller DT; 74 Billy Ray Smith DT; 78 Bubba Smith DE	Linebackers (LB): 32 Mike Curtis OLB; 53 Dennis Gaubatz MLB; 51 Bob Grant OLB; 55 Ron Porter OLB; 66 Don Shinnick OLB; 64 Sid Williams OLB; Defensive backs (DB): 37 Ocie Austin CB; 40 Bobby Boyd CB; 20 Jerry Logan SS; 43 Lenny Lyles CB; 47 Charlie Stukes CB; 21 Rick Volk FS; Special teams (ST): 49 David Lee P; 79 Lou Michaels K	Practice squad: 29 Don Alley WR; 18 Jeff Beaver QB; 23 Walt Blackledge WR; 65 Tommy Davis DT; 35 Jim Duncan CB; 48 Doug Goodwin LB; 68 Charlie Johnson DT; Reserve None - vacant Rookies in italics

== Regular season ==
=== Schedule ===
Week	Date	Opponent	Result	Record	Venue	Attendance
1	September 15	**San Francisco 49ers**	**W** 27–10	1–0	Memorial Stadium	56,864
2	September 22	at **Atlanta Falcons**	**W** 28–20	2–0	Atlanta Stadium	50,428
3	September 29	at Pittsburgh Steelers	**W** 41–7	3–0	Pitt Stadium	44,480
4	October 6	Chicago Bears	**W** 28–7	4–0	Memorial Stadium	60,238
5	October 13	at **San Francisco 49ers**	**W** 42–14	5–0	Kezar Stadium	32,822
6	October 20	Cleveland Browns	**L** 20–30	5–1	Memorial Stadium	60,238
7	October 27	**Los Angeles Rams**	**W** 27–10	6–1	Memorial Stadium	60,238
8	November 3	at New York Giants	**W** 26–0	7–1	Yankee Stadium	62,973
9	November 10	at Detroit Lions	**W** 27–10	8–1	Tiger Stadium	55,170
10	November 17	St. Louis Cardinals	**W** 27–0	9–1	Memorial Stadium	60,238
11	November 24	Minnesota Vikings	**W** 21–9	10–1	Memorial Stadium	60,238
12	December 1	**Atlanta Falcons**	**W** 44–0	11–1	Memorial Stadium	60,238
13	December 7	at Green Bay Packers	**W** 16–3	12–1	Lambeau Field	50,861
14	December 15	at **Los Angeles Rams**	**W** 28–24	13–1	Los Angeles Memorial Coliseum	69,397
Note: Intra-division opponents are in **bold** text.

=== Game summaries ===
==== Week 11: vs. Minnesota Vikings ====
Minnesota Vikings (6–4) at Baltimore Colts (9–1) – Game summary

Quarter	1	2	3	4	Total
Vikings	0	3	3	3	**9**
**Colts**	7	14	0	0	**21**

at Memorial Stadium, Baltimore, Maryland

- Date: November 24, 1968
- Game time: 1:00 p.m.
- Game weather: 50 °F or 10 °C, relative humidity 63%, wind 9 miles per hour (14 km/h; 7.8 kn)
- TV: CBS

Game information

**First quarter**

- BAL — Terry Cole 1-yard rush (Lou Michaels kick). Colts 7–0

**Second quarter**

- BAL — Willie Richardson 39-yard pass from Earl Morrall (Lou Michaels kick). Colts 14–0
- BAL — Tom Mitchell 18-yard pass from Earl Morrall (Lou Michaels kick). Colts 21–0
- MIN — Fred Cox 43-yard field goal. Colts 21–3

**Third quarter**

- MIN — Fred Cox 36-yard field goal. Colts 21–6

**Fourth quarter**

- MIN — Fred Cox 31-yard field goal. Colts 21–9

**Top passers**

- BAL — Earl Morrall — 17/24, 259 yards, 2 TD, 2 INT
- MIN — Gary Cuozzo — 12/18, 141 yards

**Top rushers**

- BAL — Terry Cole — 20 rushes, 71 yards, TD
- MIN — Clinton Jones — 10 rushes, 53 yards

**Top receivers**

- BAL — Willie Richardson — 6 receptions, 150 yards, TD
- MIN — John Beasley — 6 receptions, 79 yards

This would be the last occasion the Colts hosted the Vikings in the regular season until 2000 in Indianapolis. The intervening gap — following the playoff meeting between the same teams at the same venue — of 31 seasons constitutes the second-longest gap without one team visiting another in NFL history. (Note: Tampa Bay did not play at Buffalo until 2009, although the Buccaneers joined the league 33 seasons previously.)

== Standings ==
NFL Coastal
	W	L	T	PCT	DIV	CONF	PF	PA	STK
Baltimore Colts	13	1	0	.929	6–0	10–0	402	144	W8
Los Angeles Rams	10	3	1	.769	3–2–1	6–3–1	312	200	L2
San Francisco 49ers	7	6	1	.538	2–3–1	4–5–1	303	310	W1
Atlanta Falcons	2	12	0	.143	0–6	1–9	170	389	L4

Note: Tie games were not officially counted in the standings until 1972.

== Post-season ==
The team made it to the playoffs as winners of the Coastal division and hosted the Minnesota Vikings of the Central division for the Western Conference title. The Colts took a 21–0 lead and went on to win 24–14. They then traveled to Cleveland to take on the Browns in the NFL Championship Game. Baltimore's only loss of the season came at home to the Browns in October, falling 20–30. In late December, the Colts defense was on top of their game as they shut out the Browns 34–0 to gain their third NFL title. The 1968 Colts were being touted as "the greatest football team in history."

In Super Bowl III, the Colts took on the heavy underdog New York Jets led by quarterback Joe Namath, with the Colts favored by 19 1/2 points. Before the game, former NFL star and coach Norm Van Brocklin ridiculed the AFL, saying "This will be Namath's first professional football game." Three days before the game, Namath was being heckled in Miami and he responded by saying: "We’re going to win Sunday. I guarantee it." The Jets beat the Colts 16–7 in one of the biggest upsets in American sports history.

Perhaps the biggest effect of the Colts' loss is that the predominant sentiment that the AFL was not strong enough to merge with the NFL was firmly squelched.

Round	Date	Opponent	Result	Record	Venue	Attendance
Western Conference	December 22	Minnesota Vikings	W 24–14	1–0	Memorial Stadium	60,238
NFL Championship	December 29	at Cleveland Browns	W 34–0	2–0	Cleveland Municipal Stadium	80,628
Super Bowl III	January 12, 1969	New York Jets	L 7–16	2–1	Miami Orange Bowl	75,389

=== Conference Playoff: vs. Minnesota Vikings ===
Minnesota Vikings (8–6) at Baltimore Colts (13–1) – Game summary

Quarter	1	2	3	4	Total
Vikings	0	0	0	14	14
Colts	0	7	14	3	24

at Memorial Stadium, Baltimore, Maryland

- Date: December 22, 1968
- Game time: 1:00 p.m.
- Game weather: 33 °F or 0.6 °C, relative humidity 73%, wind 7 miles per hour (11 km/h; 6.1 kn), wind chill 27 °F or −2.8 °C
- TV: CBS

Game information

First quarter

- No scoring plays

Second quarter

- BAL — Tom Mitchell 3-yard pass from Earl Morrall (Lou Michaels kick). Colts 7–0

Third quarter

- BAL – John Mackey 49-yard pass from Earl Morrall (Lou Michaels kick). Colts 14–0
- BAL — Mike Curtis 60-yard defensive fumble return (Lou Michaels kick). Colts 21–0

Fourth quarter

- MIN — Billy Martin 1-yard pass from Joe Kapp (Fred Cox kick). Colts 21–7
- BAL — Lou Michaels 33-yard field goal. Colts 24–7
- MIN — Bill Brown 7-yard pass from Joe Kapp (Fred Cox kick). Colts 24–14

Top passers

- BAL — Earl Morrall — 13/22, 280 yards, 2 TD, INT
- MIN — Joe Kapp — 26/44, 287 yards, 2 TD, 2 INT

Top rushers

- BAL — Tom Matte — 14 rushes, 31 yards
- MIN — Joe Kapp — 10 rushes, 52 yards

Top receivers

- BAL — Willie Richardson — 6 receptions, 148 yards
- MIN — Gene Washington — 5 receptions, 95 yards

Following upon their last regular-season visit to the Colts for 32 years, the Vikings would visit the Colts for the last time in a competition game until 2000 in their first-ever postseason appearance.

== Awards ==
- Earl Morrall: AP NFL MVP
- Don Shula: AP NFL Coach of the Year

== See also ==
- Baltimore Colts
- List of Indianapolis Colts seasons
