= Ocie Austin =

American football player (1947–2014)

No. 37, 28
- Position: Defensive back

Personal information
- Born: January 8, 1947; Norfolk, Virginia, U.S.
- Died: July 22, 2014 (aged 67); Vallejo, California, U.S.
- Listed height: 6 ft 3 in (1.91 m)
- Listed weight: 200 lb (91 kg)

Career information
- High school: Berkeley (Berkeley, California)
- College: Utah State (1964-1967)
- NFL draft: 1968: 10th round, 257th overall pick

Career history
- Baltimore Colts (1968–1969); Pittsburgh Steelers (1970–1971)

Awards and highlights
- NFL champion (1968)

Career NFL statistics
- Interceptions: 3
- Stats at Pro Football Reference

Ocie Moore Austin (January 8, 1947 – July 22, 2014) was an American professional football defensive back in the National Football League (NFL). He attended Utah State University. He was one of the fifteen plaintiffs in Mackey v. National Football League in which Judge Earl R. Larson declared that the Rozelle rule was a violation of antitrust laws on December 30, 1975.
