= 1968 Cleveland Browns season =

NFL team season

- General manager: Harold Sauerbrei
- Head coach: Blanton Collier
- Home stadium: Cleveland Stadium

Results
- Record: 10–4
- Division place: 1st NFL Century
- Playoffs: Won Eastern Conference Championship Game (vs. Cowboys) 31–20; Lost NFL Championship (vs. Colts) 0–34
- Pro Bowlers: Walter Johnson, DT; Ernie Kellermann, S Dick Schafrath, LT; Milt Morin, TE; Erich Barnes, CB; Paul Warfield, E Leroy Kelly, RB; Gene Hickerson, G

The 1968 Cleveland Browns season was the team's 19th season with the National Football League. The Browns made it to the playoffs for the 2nd straight year thanks to an 8-game winning streak. Quarterback Bill Nelsen replaced Frank Ryan as the starting quarterback prior to week 4 of their season.

Veteran wide receiver Paul Warfield had the best season of his entire career catching 50 passes for 1,067 yards and scoring 12 touchdowns.

== Season summary ==
The Browns had enjoyed some recent success, qualifying for the 1965 season NFL Championship Game, in which they lost to the Green Bay Packers 23–12. They finished 9–5 in 1966 and '67, making the playoffs in 1967. The Dallas Cowboys blew them out 52–14 in the Eastern Conference Championship Game. The Browns retooled their roster entered the 1968 season and sought to reestablish themselves as series title contenders. After a slow start in which they lost two of their first three games and three of their first five, the re-tooled Browns won eight in a row before falling 27–16 to the St. Louis Cardinals in a meaningless game in the regular-season finale. The result was a 10–4 mark, the Century Division crown (by the slimmest of margins over the 9–4–1 Cardinals) and a spot in the conference title game again opposite those same Cowboys.

Only this time, the Browns advanced, beating Dallas 31–20 to get to the league title game against the Baltimore Colts. The Colts were returning to Cleveland Stadium, where they were had been stunned by the Browns 27–0 in the championship contest four years before. The Colts got revenge with a shutout victory of their own, 34–0, and advanced to Super Bowl III.

The key to the Browns' turnaround in 1968 was the insertion of Bill Nelsen at quarterback early in the season. Nelsen had been acquired in an offseason trade with the Pittsburgh Steelers. He replaced Frank Ryan, who had been the team's starting quarterback since 1963 and lead the team on its playoff run in 1964. By 1968, though, Ryan was struggling with shoulder problems. Nelsen made an impact right away, helping to beat the Colts 30–20 to hand Baltimore its only loss in a 13–1 season.

== Offseason ==
=== NFL draft ===
The following were selected in the 1968 NFL/AFL draft.

1968 Cleveland Browns draft
Round	Selection	Player	Position	College	Notes
1	21	Marvin Upshaw	Defensive end	Trinity	
2	47	John Garlington	Linebacker	LSU	
3	64	Harry Olszewski	Guard	Clemson	
3	66	Reece Morrison	Running back	Texas State	
4	104	Wayne Meylan	Linebacker	Nebraska	
5	131	Mike Wempe	Tackle	Missouri	
5	134	Jackie Jackson	Running back	Clemson	
6	152	Nate James	Defensive back	Florida A&M	
7	186	Dale Brady	Running back	Memphis	
8	212	Tom Schoen	Defensive back	Notre Dame	
9	238	David Porter	Defensive tackle	Michigan	
10	255	James Greer	Defensive end	Stephen F. Austin	
10	267	Alvin Mitchell	Defensive back	Morgan State	
11	293	Jim Alcorn	Quarterback	Clarion	
12	319	Tom Beutler	Linebacker	Toledo	
13	348	Terry Sellers	Defensive back	Georgia	
14	374	Edgar Whipps	Running back	Jackson State	
15	400	Bob Baxter	Flanker	Memphis	
16	429	Dick Sievert	Defensive end	Wisconsin-River Falls	
17	455	Wayne McDuffie	Center	Florida State	

=== Undrafted free agents ===
1968 undrafted free agents of note
Player	Position	College
Mel Jernigan	Tackle	Harding

== Personnel ==
=== Roster ===
1968 Cleveland Browns roster
Quarterbacks: 11 Don Gault; 16 Bill Nelsen; 13 Frank Ryan; Running backs: 48 Ernie Green; 31 Charley Harraway; 44 Leroy Kelly; 25 Charlie Leigh; 26 Reece Morrison; Wide receivers: 87 Eppie Barney; 86 Gary Collins; 43 Ron Green; 29 Tommy McDonald; 42 Paul Warfield; Tight ends: 89 Milt Morin; 41 Ralph Smith	Offensive linemen: 73 Monte Clark T; 64 Jim Copeland C/G; 55 John Demarie G; 66 Gene Hickerson G; 54 Fred Hoaglin C; -- Dave Porter T (IR); 77 Dick Schafrath T; 62 Joe Taffoni T; 53 Bob Whitlow C; Defensive linemen: 80 Bill Glass DE; 81 Jack Gregory DE; 71 Walter Johnson DT; 69 Jim Kanicki DT; 74 Bill Sabatino DT; 88 Ron Snidow DE; 84 Marvin Upshaw DT	Linebackers: 52 Billy Andrews OLB; -- Tom Beutler OLB; 50 John Garlington OLB; 82 Jim Houston OLB; 51 Dale Lindsey OLB; 56 Bob Matheson MLB; 59 Wayne Meylan MLB; Defensive backs: 40 Erich Barnes CB; 28 Ben Davis CB; 34 Mike Howell FS; 33 Nate James CB; 24 Ernie Kellermann SS; 49 Alvin Mitchell CB; 27 Carl Ward FS; -- Tom Schoen S (Military); Special teams: 12 Don Cockroft K/P; rookies in italics

=== Staff/Coaches ===
1968 Cleveland Browns staff
Front office: Majority owner/CEO & president – Art Modell; Minority owner/vice president – Al Lerner; General manager – Harold Sauerbrei; Coaching staff: Head coach – Blanton Collier; Offensive coaches: Offensive coordinator – Nick Skorich; Offensive line – Fritz Heisler; Receivers - Bob Nussbaumer	Defensive coaches: Defensive Coordinator - Howard Brinker; Defensive line – Dick Modzelewski; Linebackers – Ed Ulinski; Strength & Conditioning: Athletic Trainer - Leo Murphy; Equipment Manager - Morris Kono

== Exhibition schedule ==
Week	Date	Opponent	Result	Attendance
1	August 9	at Los Angeles Rams	L 21–23	64,020
2	August 18	at San Francisco 49ers	W 31–17	26,801
3	August 24	at New Orleans Saints	L 27–40	70,045
4	August 30	at Buffalo Bills	W 22–12	45,448
5	September 7	Green Bay Packers	L 9–31	84,918

There was a doubleheader on September 7, 1968 Lions vs Jets (AFL) and Packers vs Browns.

== Regular season schedule ==
Week	Date	Opponent	Result	Record	Attendance
1	September 15	at New Orleans Saints	W 24–10	1–0	74,215
2	September 22	at Dallas Cowboys	L 7–28	1–1	68,733
3	September 29	Los Angeles Rams	L 6–24	1–2	82,514
4	October 5	Pittsburgh Steelers	W 31–24	2–2	81,865
5	October 13	St. Louis Cardinals	L 21–27	2–3	79,349
6	October 20	at Baltimore Colts	W 30–20	3–3	60,238
7	October 27	Atlanta Falcons	W 30–7	4–3	67,723
8	November 3	at San Francisco 49ers	W 33–21	5–3	31,359
9	November 10	New Orleans Saints	W 35–17	6–3	71,025
10	November 17	at Pittsburgh Steelers	W 45–24	7–3	41,572
11	November 24	Philadelphia Eagles	W 47–13	8–3	62,338
12	December 1	New York Giants	W 45–10	9–3	83,193
13	December 8	at Washington Redskins	W 24–21	10–3	50,661
14	December 14	at St. Louis Cardinals	L 16–27	10–4	39,746

== Game summaries ==
=== Week 7: vs. Atlanta ===
Week 7: Atlanta Falcons at Cleveland Browns – Game summary

Quarter	1	2	3	4	Total
Falcons	0	0	0	7	7
Browns	7	13	3	7	30

at Cleveland Stadium, Cleveland, Ohio

- Date: October 27
- Game time: 1:30 p.m. EST
- Game weather: 45 °F (7 °C), relative humidity 63%, round (wind) 17 mph
- Game attendance: 67,723
- TV announcers (CBS): Frank Glieber (play–by–play), Eddie LeBaron (color commentator) and John Fitzgerald (sideline reporter)

Game information

First Quarter

- CLE – Kelly 5 yard rush (Cockroft kick)
  Browns 7, Falcons 0

Second Quarter

- CLE – Kelly 1 yard rush (Cockroft kick)
  Browns 14, Falcons 0
- CLE – Cockroft 25 yard field goal
  Browns 17, Falcons 0
- CLE – Cockroft 42 yard field goal
  Browns 20, Falcons 0

Third Quarter

- CLE – Cockroft 34 yard field goal
  Browns 23, Falcons 0

Fourth Quarter

- CLE – Warfield 22 yard pass from Nelsen (Cockroft kick)
  Browns 30, Falcons 0
- ATL – Donohoe 7 yard pass from Berry (Etter kick)
  Browns 30, Falcons 7

Top passers

- ATL – Bob Berry 8/10, 107 yds, 1 TD, 1 INT
- CLE – Bill Nelsen 18/27, 248 yds, 1 TD

Top rushers

- ATL – Cannonball Butler 13 carr, 73 yds
- CLE – Leroy Kelly 19 carr, 112 yds, 2 TD

Top receivers

- ATL – Bob Long 4 rec, 73 yds
- CLE – Milt Morin 5 rec, 98 yds

Turnovers

- ATL – 2
- CLE – 0

== Playoffs ==
Round	Date	Opponent	Result	Record	Venue	Attendance	Recap
Eastern Conference	December 21	Dallas Cowboys	W 31–20	1–0	Cleveland Municipal Stadium	81,497	Recap
NFL Championship	December 29	Baltimore Colts	L 0–34	1–1	Cleveland Municipal Stadium	80,628	Recap

== Standings ==
NFL Century
	W	L	T	PCT	DIV	CONF	PF	PA	STK
Cleveland Browns	10	4	0	.714	4–2	7–3	394	273	L1
St. Louis Cardinals	9	4	1	.692	5–0–1	8–1–1	325	289	W4
New Orleans Saints	4	9	1	.308	2–4	3–7	246	327	W1
Pittsburgh Steelers	2	11	1	.154	0–5–1	1–8–1	244	397	L5

Note: Tie games were not officially counted in the standings until 1972.

== Awards and honors ==
- LeRoy Kelly, Bert Bell Award
