= Frank Ryan (American football) =

American football player (1936–2024)

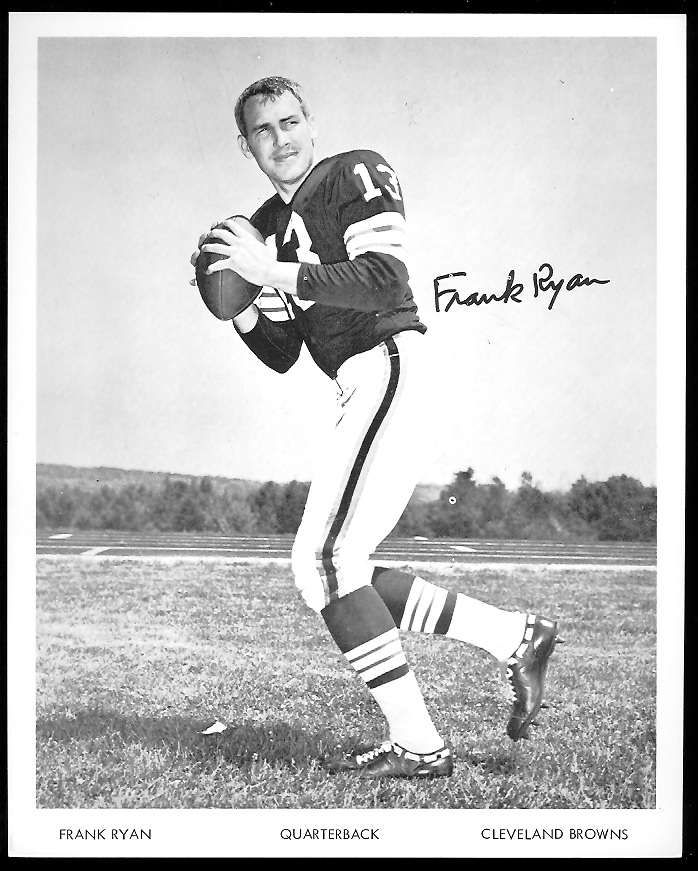
- Ryan with the Cleveland Browns in 1968

No. 13, 15
- Position: Quarterback

Personal information
- Born: July 12, 1936; Fort Worth, Texas, U.S.
- Died: January 1, 2024 (aged 87); Waterford, Connecticut, U.S.
- Listed height: 6 ft 3 in (1.91 m)
- Listed weight: 199 lb (90 kg)

Career information
- High school: R. L. Paschal (Fort Worth)
- College: Rice (1954–1957)
- NFL draft: 1958: 5th round, 55th overall pick

Career history
- Los Angeles Rams (1958–1961); Cleveland Browns (1962–1968); Washington Redskins (1969–1970)

Awards and highlights
- NFL champion (1964); 3× Pro Bowl (1964–1966); 2× NFL passing touchdowns leader (1964, 1966); Cleveland Browns Legends

Career NFL statistics
- Passing attempts: 2,133
- Passing completions: 1,090
- Completion percentage: 51.1%
- TD–INT: 149–111
- Passing yards: 16,042
- Passer rating: 77.6
- Stats at Pro Football Reference

Francis Beall Ryan (July 12, 1936 – January 1, 2024) was an American professional football player who was a quarterback in the National Football League (NFL) for the Los Angeles Rams (1958–1961), Cleveland Browns (1962–1968), and Washington Redskins (1969–1970). He played college football for the Rice Owls. A three-time Pro Bowl selection with Cleveland, Ryan led the Browns to their most recent National Football League title in 1964. He was also a mathematician, serving as a faculty member at Case Western Reserve University from 1967 to 1974.

== Early life ==
Ryan was born on July 12, 1936, in Fort Worth, Texas. Ryan was named for his grandfather Frank Beall, a noted surgeon in Fort Worth, and was the second child of Frances (Beall) Ryan and Robert Willing Ryan Sr. Ryan played football while attending R. L. Paschal High School in Fort Worth. He was later inducted into the Fort Worth Independent School District Wall of Fame.

He was recruited by college coaches from across the country, including Bear Bryant then coaching at Texas A&M, and he was admitted to Yale University. Ryan declared a major in physics at Rice University, becoming the first in his family not to go to Yale. He was unable to establish himself at quarterback during the course of his collegiate career, splitting time behind center with King Hill, who was receiving most of the snaps, with Ryan as the second-string quarterback. Ryan did come in for a faltering Hill in the 1958 Cotton Bowl on New Year's Day to throw a touchdown pass, though eventually losing to Navy. In November 1957, Ryan also played a key role in Rice's upsetting Bryant's top ranked Texas A&M team to win the Southwest Conference title for Rice. Rice ended the year ranked eighth in the nation by the Associated Press.

Given his desire to obtain a Ph.D., Ryan originally decided not to play professional football after the Los Angeles Rams chose him 55th overall in the fifth round of the 1958 NFL draft. He changed his mind after he was able to enroll at both UCLA and the University of California, Berkeley in pursuit of an advanced degree. Ryan then transferred back to Rice, where he studied during the off-season. Ryan's college teammate Hill was drafted first overall in the 1958 draft by the Chicago Cardinals, and future Cleveland teammate quarterback Jim Ninowski was selected by the Browns in the fourth round.

== Professional career ==
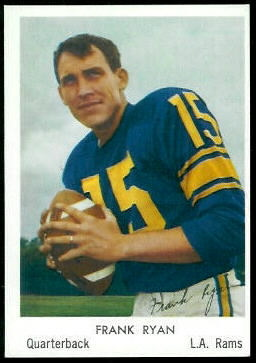
Ryan with the Los Angeles Rams in 1959.

=== Los Angeles Rams ===
Ryan spent the first four years of his career primarily in a reserve capacity, making $12,000 per year. He did start a handful of games in competition with Billy Wade and Zeke Bratkowski. In 1961, he and future Hall of Famer Ollie Matson connected on a 96-yard touchdown reception, establishing a new team record. However, after sitting on the bench for the last four games of the 1961 season, Ryan stormed into the dressing room and threatened General Manager Elroy "Crazylegs" Hirsch that he was going to quit football if he were not traded. He became part of a multi-player deal with the Cleveland Browns on July 12, 1962, his 26th birthday, as the arrival of highly touted newcomer Roman Gabriel, whom the Rams selected with the second overall pick in the 1962 draft, made Ryan expendable. Ironically, the Rams did not start Gabriel during his first four years.

=== Cleveland Browns ===
==== 1962–1963 ====
Acquired to back up starting quarterback Jim Ninowski, Ryan moved into the starting slot on October 28 when Ninowski broke his collarbone while being tackled by Pittsburgh Steelers' defensive lineman Eugene "Big Daddy" Lipscomb. With no other candidates to compete with, Ryan established his leadership and held on to the starting role for much of the next six seasons. In his first full season as a starter, 1963, Ryan threw for 2,026 yards and 25 touchdowns with only 13 interceptions, helping the Browns to a 10–4 record. Thirteen of those touchdowns went to Gary Collins, who tied for the league lead in receiving touchdowns that year.

==== 1964 ====
In 1964, Ryan established himself as one of the league's best passers. He threw for 2,404 yards and repeated his 1963 performance by completing 25 touchdown passes, which was enough to lead the league. Ryan had excellent company on the Browns offense: fullback Jim Brown; wide receivers Gary Collins and hall of famer Paul Warfield; and an outstanding offensive line which included Dick Schafrath, John Morrow, John Wooten, Monte Clark, and future Hall of Famer Gene Hickerson. But Ryan was also a clutch performer during the Browns' memorable 10–3–1 season. Needing a win in the December 12 regular season finale against the New York Giants to clinch a berth in the NFL title game, Ryan completed 12 of 13 passes for five touchdowns and ran for a sixth touchdown in the 52–20 win. Two weeks later in the championship game against the Baltimore Colts, Ryan hit Collins for three touchdowns to win the title, 27–0.

Ryan was rewarded for his performance with the first of three straight Pro Bowl appearances. Unfortunately, on the first play of the second half, he suffered a severe shoulder injury in the game after the combined 800-pound trio of Packer Willie Davis, Lion Roger Brown and Colt Gino Marchetti converged on the signal caller, resulting in a significant injury compounded by poor medical treatment. Speculation persists to this day that Marchetti went out of his way to injure Ryan due to the perception that the quarterback ran up the score in the championship, with Marchetti's statement that he wanted "one more shot" at Ryan also fueling the rumors. Ryan himself held no malice toward Marchetti, and said that he should not have tried to score an unnecessary touchdown in the 1964 championship game, which rightfully angered Marchetti. However, a study of the film by Cleveland coaches in the weeks after the game exonerated Marchetti.

After winning the championship, Art Modell raised his salary to $25,000, up from about $18,000 per season.

==== 1965 ====
Ryan's numbers dropped in 1965, throwing for only 1,751 yards and 18 touchdowns. While his shoulder had completely healed, a sore elbow in training camp and an injured arch early in the regular season played a role in his completing fewer than half of his passes during the campaign. Those struggles resulted in a continuing cool relationship with Browns' fans, who booed him often during home contests. Part of Ryan's decline can also be traced to the absence of second-year wide receiver Paul Warfield, who missed much of the season after suffering a double fracture of the collarbone in the team's first exhibition game. Despite this, the Browns reached the 1965 NFL Championship Game. Facing the Packers, he went 8-of-18 for 115 yards with a touchdown and two interceptions in the 23–12 loss.

==== 1966 ====
In 1966, he bounced back with a superb season, leading the league with 29 touchdown passes and finishing second with 2,976 yards despite playing with intense pain. Ryan's output helped alleviate the absence of the legendary Jim Brown, who had retired prior to the start of training camp. His 29 touchdown passes in 14 games ranks second in Browns franchise history to Brian Sipe, who got 30 in a 16-game 1980 season.

==== 1967 ====
On January 25, 1967, Ryan underwent an operation to repair the remaining effects of his injury. The surgery eliminated the pain, but also affected his throwing motion. In the 1967 season opener, Ryan's injury woes continued as he sprained both ankles in a 21–14 loss to the Dallas Cowboys. Battling through that malady, along with shoulder and knee troubles, Ryan led the team to a 9–5 record to reach the playoffs. The season would see Ryan suffering a concussion from a head-to-head collision with Dick Butkus. He was knocked out in the second quarter but came back to throw three touchdown passes in the third quarter to will his team to a 24–0 victory. Ryan later stated that it was this collision that necessitated the cervical disc replacement he underwent after retiring.

==== 1968 ====
Ryan's tenure as the Browns' starting quarterback came to an abrupt end following a 1–2 start to the 1968 season. Browns' head coach Blanton Collier replaced Ryan with Bill Nelsen, who went on to lead the team to a division title. The official conclusion of Ryan's time with the Browns came on September 9, 1969, when he was released, but new Redskins' coach Vince Lombardi quickly signed Ryan as a backup to future Hall of Fame quarterback Sonny Jurgenson.

In 2005, the Browns named Ryan a Browns Legend.

=== Washington Redskins ===
Despite throwing only one pass during the 1969 season, Ryan returned for the last of his 13 years in the NFL in 1970, playing for coach Bill Austin after Lombardi's death from cancer in September 1970, before officially announcing his retirement on April 13, 1971. With his accurate throwing arm, his 14.7 yards per completion still ranks as one of the all-time leaders.

== Academic career ==
Ryan attended graduate school during the first part of his playing career, and in 1965, he earned his Ph.D. from Rice. He worked for seven postgraduate years under G. R. MacLane, a leading geometric-function theorist, and produced the dissertation "Characterization of the Set of Asymptotic Values of a Function Holomorphic in the Unit Disc". In 1966, Ryan published two fundamental papers on the set of asymptotic values of a function holomorphic in the unit disc in Duke Mathematical Journal.

Ryan received the Golden Plate Award of the American Academy of Achievement in 1965.

Ryan started teaching at Rice during his career and, during his time with the Browns, he became an assistant professor at the Case Institute of Technology in February 1967. Ryan had a full teaching load, which included undergraduate and graduate courses, and conducting research in complex analysis. While at training camp, Ryan taught math in the morning and went to football practice in the afternoon. Ryan taught his last course at Case Western Reserve in the spring of 1971. He was promoted to associate professor that summer. After taking a leave of absence for the next three years, he resigned his faculty position in 1974.

Ryan learned computer programming and software through the Chi Corp., Case Western Reserve's then newly launched private computer company. He compiled advanced statistics to apply what he learned to football. The Browns were shown his results and liked the project but didn't offer the extra cash to move it forward.

Ryan's second career was fodder for many jokes by sportswriters. Red Smith wrote that the Browns' offense consisted of a quarterback who understood Einstein's theory of relativity and ten teammates who didn't know there was one. Ryan was somewhat put off by the focus on his academic life, as he considered himself to be a regular football player.

Ryan considered Sir Edward Collingwood, an expert in meromorphic functions and the theory of cluster sets, and Arthur J. Lohwater, the former editor of Mathematical Reviews, as mentors. Ryan had an Erdős number of 3.

== Post-NFL career ==
Soon after his retirement from the Redskins, Ryan remained in the nation's capital when he was named director of information services for the U.S. House of Representatives. While there, he helped advance the computer age in politics by playing an integral role in establishing the body's first electronic voting system. This enabled voting procedures that usually ran for 45 minutes to be shortened to around 15 minutes. By the time he left the post, the office had an annual budget of $8 million with a staff of 225.

Ryan resigned that post to become athletic director and lecturer in mathematics at Yale University on March 7, 1977. Ryan served in that position for ten years before resigning to become the school's associate vice president for institutional planning.

During the late 1970s a Yale employee informed Ryan that many thousands of nude photographs of young men in front, side and rear poses with metal pins sticking out from their spines had been discovered in a room in Payne Whitney Gymnasium. Ryan investigated, finding that they depicted decades of Yale freshmen whose posture had been documented as part of a questionable study on the long-term effects of posture. Ryan then quickly called in a document-disposal expert who shredded and then burned the photos.

Ryan was a member of the Rice board of governors from 1972 to 1976 and was recognized as a distinguished alumnus in 1987. Ryan became vice president for external affairs at Rice in August 1990, increasing annual gifts to the university to a three-year average of $32.8 million for the fiscal years 1992–94 from $21.4 million for the fiscal years 1988–90. In 1995, he resigned his post as vice president for external affairs at Rice, owing to differences with President Malcolm Gillis concerning the future course of external affairs. Ryan ended his institutional career as a professor of mathematics, and professor of computational and applied mathematics at Rice. He was inducted into the Rice Athletic Hall of Fame in 1973, and was honored as a Distinguished Alumnus for mathematics and education.

Ryan was president and chief executive officer of Contex Electronics, which designed and manufactured cable and interconnect products for the computer and communications industries. Ryan also served as director for America West Airlines, Sequoia Voting Systems, and of Danielson Holding Corporation. He was an advisory director of United Medical Care Inc.

In retirement, he ran a self-designed program that helps micro-analyze statistical behavior of the up-and-down pricing movement that underlies the pricing behavior of the futures market. He also worked on Oppermann's conjecture about the distribution of prime numbers.

== Personal life ==
Ryan lived on 78 acres of heavily forested land in Grafton, Vermont, with his wife, Joan, a retired sportswriter and nationally syndicated columnist for The Washington Post. His wife was one of the first female sportswriters ever to grace a locker room (not to be confused with another sportswriter named Joan Ryan), was a sportswriter for the Cleveland Plain Dealer, and also wrote a book on six women in sports, Babe Didrikson Zaharias, Kathy Kusner, Wilma Rudolph, Billie Jean King, Peggy Fleming, and Melissa Belote. The two Texans met in college, fell in love with Vermont while Ryan was on staff at Yale, and had been married since their senior year at Rice, getting married on March 1, 1958.

Ryan died January 1, 2024, at a nursing home, in Waterford, Connecticut, from complications of Alzheimer's disease. He was 87. Ryan was buried in Sportsmans Road Cemetery in Stamford, Vermont. Suspecting he may have had chronic traumatic encephalopathy (CTE), Ryan arranged to donate his brain to the Boston University CTE Center. He was survived by Joan Marie (Busby) Ryan, his wife of 65 years, and children, grandchildren, and great-grandchildren.

== NFL career statistics ==
Ryan ranks fourth all-time among Browns quarterbacks with 13,499 passing yards and second behind Brian Sipe with 134 touchdowns. His 81.43 passer rating is fifth-best, behind Milt Plum, Baker Mayfield, Otto Graham, and Bernie Kosar.

Ryan's career numbers (including years with the Rams and Redskins) were 1,090 completions in 2,133 attempts for 16,044 yards, 149 touchdowns and 111 interceptions. Ryan also rushed for 1,358 yards and six touchdowns on 310 carries.

Legend
	Won the NFL championship
	Led the league
**Bold**	Career high

=== Regular season ===
Year	Team	Games			Passing									Rushing				
Year	Team	GP	GS	Record	Cmp	Att	Pct	Yds	Avg	Lng	TD	Int	Rtg	Att	Yds	Avg	Lng	TD
1958	LAR	5	0	–	5	14	35.7	34	2.4	14	1	3	28.6	5	45	**9.0**	12	0
1959	LAR	10	3	0–3	42	89	47.2	709	8.0	67	2	4	63.4	19	57	3.0	13	1
1960	LAR	11	5	3–1–1	62	128	48.4	816	6.4	61	7	9	57.9	19	85	4.5	24	1
1961	LAR	14	3	2–1	72	142	50.7	1,115	7.9	**96**	5	7	68.3	38	139	3.7	28	0
1962	CLE	11	7	3–3–1	112	194	57.7	1,541	7.9	65	10	7	85.4	42	**242**	5.8	**39**	1
1963	CLE	13	13	**10–3**	135	256	52.7	2,026	7.9	83	25	13	**90.4**	**62**	224	3.6	25	**2**
1964	CLE	14	14	**10–3–1**	174	334	52.1	2,404	7.2	62	25	**19**	76.7	37	217	5.9	19	1
1965	CLE	12	12	10–2	119	243	49.0	1,751	7.2	80	18	13	75.3	19	72	3.8	18	0
1966	CLE	14	14	9–5	**200**	**382**	52.4	**2,974**	7.8	54	**29**	14	88.2	36	156	4.3	17	0
1967	CLE	13	13	9–4	136	280	48.6	2,026	7.2	49	20	16	72.7	22	57	2.6	12	0
1968	CLE	7	3	1–2	31	66	47.0	639	**9.7**	57	7	6	79.0	11	64	5.8	19	0
1969	WAS	1	0	–	1	1	**100.0**	4	4.0	4	0	0	83.3	–	–	–	–	–
1970	WAS	1	0	–	1	4	25.0	3	3.0	3	0	0	39.6	–	–	–	–	–
Career		126	87	57–27–3	1,090	2,133	51.1	16,042	7.5	96	149	111	77.6	310	1,358	4.4	39	6

=== Postseason ===
Legend
Won the NFL championship

Year	Team	Games			Passing									Rushing				
Year	Team	GP	GS	Record	Cmp	Att	Pct	Yds	Avg	Lng	TD	Int	Rtg	Att	Yds	Avg	Lng	TD
1964	CLE	1	1	**1–0**	11	18	**61.1**	**206**	**11.4**	51	**3**	1	**117.1**	**3**	2	0.7	4	0
1965	CLE	1	1	0–1	8	18	44.4	115	6.4	30	1	**2**	44.7	**3**	9	3.0	**8**	0
1967	CLE	1	1	0–1	**14**	**30**	46.7	194	6.5	**75**	2	1	76.2	2	**14**	**7.0**	7	0
1968	CLE	2	0	–	2	6	33.3	19	3.2	10	0	0	43.1	2	0	0.0	0	0
Career		5	3	1–2	35	72	48.6	534	7.4	75	6	4	78.1	10	25	2.5	8	0

== Other sources ==
- Grossi, Tony (2004). Tales from the Browns Sideline. (Champaign, Ill.): Sports Publishing LLC. ISBN 1-58261-713-9
- Stewart, Todd, ed. (2004) Cleveland Browns 2004 Media Guide. New York: National Communications Group
