= Tom Mitchell (American football) =

American football player (1944–2017)

No. 82, 84
- Positions: Tight end, wide receiver

Personal information
- Born: August 22, 1944; Newport, Rhode Island, U.S.
- Died: July 16, 2017 (aged 72); Cape Coral, Florida, U.S.
- Listed height: 6 ft 2 in (1.88 m)
- Listed weight: 215 lb (98 kg)

Career information
- High school: Plymouth-Whitemarsh (Plymouth Meeting, Pennsylvania)
- College: Bucknell
- AFL draft: 1966: 6th round, 58th overall pick

Career history
- Oakland Raiders (1966); Baltimore Colts (1968–1973); San Francisco 49ers (1974–1977)

Awards and highlights
- Super Bowl champion (V); NFL champion (1968); 2× First-team Little All-American (1964, 1965); First-team All-East (1965)

Career statistics
- Receptions: 239
- Receiving yards: 3,181
- Receiving touchdowns: 24
- Stats at Pro Football Reference

Thomas Gordon Mitchell (August 22, 1944 – July 16, 2017) was an American college and professional football player.

A 6'2", 215 lb (98 kg). tight end from Bucknell University and member of the Bucknell Athletics Hall of Fame, Mitchell played one season (1966) for the American Football League (AFL)'s Oakland Raiders, and ten seasons (1968–1977) in the National Football League (NFL) for the Baltimore Colts and the San Francisco 49ers. He was nicknamed "the Crocodile" and his pouring of a pitcher of beer on the head of author George Plimpton is recounted in the book Mad Ducks and Bears. He died of cancer at the age of 72 in 2017. He was father-in-law to former Tampa Bay Buccaneers and current Rutgers head coach Greg Schiano, and grandfather to Bucknell defensive lineman Joe Schiano.

== See also ==
- List of American Football League players
