= Tom Matte =

American football player (1939–2021)

- Matte in 2012

No. 27, 41
- Position: Running back

Personal information
- Born: June 14, 1939; Pittsburgh, Pennsylvania, U.S.
- Died: November 2, 2021 (aged 82); Ruxton, Maryland, U.S.
- Listed height: 6 ft 0 in (1.83 m)
- Listed weight: 214 lb (97 kg)

Career information
- High school: Shaw (East Cleveland, Ohio)
- College: Ohio State
- NFL draft: 1961: 1st round, 7th overall pick
- AFL draft: 1961: 5th round, 34th overall pick

Career history
- Baltimore Colts (1961–1972)

Awards and highlights
- Super Bowl champion (V); NFL champion (1968); 2× Pro Bowl (1968, 1969); NFL rushing touchdowns leader (1969); Third-team All-American (1960); First-team All-Big Ten (1960)

Career NFL statistics
- Rushing yards: 4,646
- Rushing average: 3.9
- Receptions: 249
- Receiving yards: 2,869
- Total touchdowns: 57
- Stats at Pro Football Reference

Thomas Roland Matte (/ˈmætiː/ MAT-ee; June 14, 1939 – November 2, 2021), nicknamed "Garbage Can", was an American professional football player who spent his entire 12-season career as a running back for the Baltimore Colts of the National Football League (NFL). He played college football as a quarterback for the Ohio State Buckeyes, and was selected by the Colts in the 1961 NFL draft and by the New York Titans in the 1961 AFL draft.

== Early life ==
Thomas Roland Matte was born on June 14, 1939, in Pittsburgh, Pennsylvania. He attended Shaw High School in East Cleveland, Ohio.

== College career ==
Matte played quarterback at Ohio State University, but was more known for his rushing skills than passing prowess. For his senior year, he finished seventh in voting for the Heisman Trophy (awarded to halfback Joe Bellino of Navy), finishing under future stars such as Billy Kilmer and Mike Ditka.

== Professional career ==
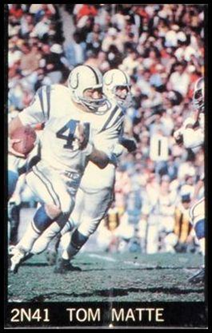
1968 Champion Corn Flakes Football card of Matte for Baltimore Colts

Matte spent his 12-year professional career with the Baltimore Colts where he posted career stats of 4,646 rushing yards, 249 receptions for 2,869 yards, 1,367 yards returning kickoffs, and 57 touchdowns (45 rushing, 12 receiving). Late in the 1965 season, Matte also memorably filled in as an emergency quarterback when Johnny Unitas and Gary Cuozzo went down with season-ending injuries in consecutive home losses to the Chicago Bears and Green Bay Packers, respectively. For the Colts' regular-season finale (a 20–17 win) against the Los Angeles Rams and the following weekend's one-game playoff at Green Bay (a 13–10 overtime loss), Colts head coach Don Shula put a list of plays on a wristband that Matte wore. The wristband is now on display at the Pro Football Hall of Fame.

Matte would bloom late in his career. In 1968, he earned his first Pro Bowl honor after rushing for 662 yards on 183 carries for nine touchdowns. He also caught 25 passes for 275 yards and a touchdown. That season, the Colts advanced all the way to the NFL Championship Game. While he did have a quiet game against the Minnesota Vikings in the first playoff game (a 24–14 win where he ran for 31 yards), he came alive in the 1968 NFL Championship Game. Avenging his prior quiet games, he rushed for 88 yards on 17 carries for three touchdowns to galvanize the Colts to a 34–0 victory over the Cleveland Browns, avenging their loss in the title game four years prior. It won Matte a cover on the January 6, 1969 cover of Sports Illustrated, taken after he had scored his third touchdown of the afternoon in the NFL Championship Game against the Cleveland Browns. The Colts were the winners of the penultimate NFL title game and advanced to Super Bowl III. Matte would rush for 116 yards on 11 carries while catching two passes for thirty yards; he set the record for highest per-carry rushing average in a Super Bowl game with 10.5, with his biggest run being a run of 58 yards that was stopped by his former teammate Johnny Sample. However, Matte would fail to reach the end zone and a fumble to start the second half only made the Colts more frustrated on their way to a 16–7 loss. The following year was even better, as he rushed for a career high 909 yards on 235 carries with a league-high 11 touchdowns while adding 43 catches for 513 yards for two touchdowns. His total touches, yards from scrimmage (1,422) and touchdowns were all league highs.

Matte was injured in the first game of the 1970 season against the San Diego Chargers and therefore did not play when the Colts returned to Super Bowl V at the end of that season and beat the Dallas Cowboys. However, he was awarded a Super Bowl ring. Matte returned for one last fresh run with the 1971 season, playing in all 14 games and rushing for 607 yards on 173 carries for eight touchdowns while catching 29 passes for 239 yards. The Colts made a run at the AFC title game once again. Matte would have his last significant playtime with the game against Cleveland, rushing 16 times for 26 yards while catching three passes for 22 yards as the Colts won 20–3. In the AFC Championship against the Miami Dolphins, he made just one catch for six yards as the Colts lost 21–0.

After spending most of the 1972 season on the practice squad, he was traded from the Colts to the Chargers for a 1973 eighth-round selection (189th overall–Ray Oldham) on January 24, 1973.

Following Unitas' lead, Matte and many of his Baltimore Colt teammates disowned the franchise after their move to Indianapolis in 1984.

== Broadcasting career ==
Matte was a color analyst on CBS coverage of NFL games from 1976 to 1978. From 1996 to 2005, Matte teamed with Baltimore sportscaster Scott Garceau in broadcasting Baltimore Ravens games on local radio.

== Personal life and death ==
Matte married his wife Judy in 1962, with whom he had two children. Matte died on November 2, 2021, in Ruxton, Maryland, from complications of leukemia. He was 82.

== Career statistics ==
=== NFL ===
Legend
	Won NFL Championship
	Super Bowl champion
	Led the league
**Bold**	Career high

Year	Team	Games		Rushing						Receiving					Fumbles	
Year	Team	GP	GS	Att	Yds	Avg	Y/G	Lng	TD	Rec	Yds	Avg	Lng	TD	Fum	FR
1961	BAL	8	2	13	54	4.2	6.8	11	0	1	8	8.0	8	0	0	0
1962	BAL	**14**	5	74	226	3.1	16.1	29	2	8	81	10.1	22	1	2	**1**
1963	BAL	**14**	13	133	541	4.1	38.6	31	4	**48**	466	9.7	49	1	2	0
1964	BAL	**14**	2	42	215	**5.1**	15.4	**80**	1	10	169	**16.9**	30	0	0	0
1965	BAL	**14**	3	69	235	3.4	16.8	20	1	12	131	10.9	15	0	2	0
1966	BAL	**14**	4	86	381	4.4	27.2	30	0	23	307	13.3	35	**3**	2	0
1967	BAL	**14**	**14**	147	636	4.3	45.4	30	9	35	496	14.2	**88**	**3**	1	0
1968	BAL	**14**	**14**	183	662	3.6	47.3	23	9	25	275	11.0	50	1	2	0
1969	BAL	**14**	**14**	**235**	**909**	3.9	**64.9**	26	**11**	43	**513**	11.9	49	2	**4**	0
1970	BAL	2	2	12	43	3.6	21.5	16	0	1	2	2.0	2	0	0	0
1971	BAL	**14**	**14**	173	607	3.5	43.4	26	8	29	239	8.2	34	0	4	**1**
1972	BAL	6	4	33	137	4.2	22.8	18	0	14	182	13.0	43	1	2	0
Career		142	91	1,200	4,646	3.9	32.7	80	45	249	2,869	11.5	88	12	21	2

=== College ===
Season	Team	GP	Passing					Rushing		
Season	Team	GP	Cmp	Att	Yds	TD	Int	Att	Yds	TD
1958	Ohio State	9	—	—	—	—	—	5	-4	0
1959	Ohio State	9	28	51	439	4	2	92	190	1
1960	Ohio State	9	50	95	737	8	4	161	682	2
Career		27	78	146	1,176	12	6	258	868	3

== See also ==
- Kendall Hinton, the next non-quarterback to perform that position in the NFL in 2020.
