= Alvin Mitchell (defensive back) =

American football player (born 1943)

No. 49
- Position: Defensive back

Personal information
- Born: October 18, 1943 (age 83); Philadelphia, Pennsylvania, U.S.
- Listed height: 6 ft 3 in (1.91 m)
- Listed weight: 195 lb (88 kg)

Career information
- High school: Simon Gratz (Philadelphia)
- College: Morgan State (1964–1967)
- NFL draft: 1968: 10th round, 267th overall pick

Career history
- Cleveland Browns (1968–1969); Buffalo Bills (1970)*; Denver Broncos (1970)
- * Offseason or practice squad member only
- Stats at Pro Football Reference

Alvin Eugene Mitchell (born October 18, 1943) is an American former professional football player who was a defensive back for three seasons in the National Football League (NFL) with the Cleveland Browns and Denver Broncos. He was selected by the Browns in the tenth round of the 1968 NFL/AFL draft after playing college football for the Morgan State Bears.

== Early life and college ==
Alvin Eugene Mitchell was born October 18, 1943, in Philadelphia, Pennsylvania. He attended Simon Gratz High School in Philadelphia.

He was a four-year letterman at Morgan State University from 1964 to 1967.

== Professional career ==
Mitchell was selected by the Cleveland Browns in the 10th round, with the 267th overall pick, of the 1968 NFL draft. He played in 12 games for the Browns during his rookie year in 1968. He also appeared in two playoff games that season. He played in all 14 games during the 1969 season and also two playoff games.

Mitchell was traded to the Buffalo Bills in 1970 for an undisclosed draft pick but was later waived.

He was claimed off waivers by the Denver Broncos and played in two games, starting one, for the team during the 1970 season.
