= Willie Richardson =

American football player (1939–2016)

- Richardson in 1967

No. 87
- Position: Wide receiver

Personal information
- Born: November 17, 1939; Clarksdale, Mississippi, U.S.
- Died: February 8, 2016 (aged 76); Jackson, Mississippi, U.S.
- Listed height: 6 ft 2 in (1.88 m)
- Listed weight: 198 lb (90 kg)

Career information
- High school: Coleman (Greenville, Mississippi)
- College: Jackson State
- NFL draft: 1963: 7th round, 89th overall pick
- AFL draft: 1963: 3rd round, 19th overall pick

Career history
- Baltimore Colts (1963–1969); Miami Dolphins (1970); Baltimore Colts (1971)

Awards and highlights
- NFL champion (1968); First-team All-Pro (1967); Second-team All-Pro (1968); 2× Pro Bowl (1967, 1968); First-team Little All-American (1962)

Career NFL statistics
- Receptions: 195
- Receiving yards: 2,950
- Receiving touchdowns: 25
- Stats at Pro Football Reference
- College Football Hall of Fame

Willie Louis Richardson (November 17, 1939 – February 8, 2016) was an American professional football player who was a wide receiver in the National Football League (NFL). He played nine seasons with the Baltimore Colts (1963–1969, 1971) and the Miami Dolphins (1970).

A first team college All-American in 1962, Richardson was named 1st Team All-Pro by the Associated Press for his play the 1967 NFL season and went to two Pro Bowls.

He is a member of the Jackson State Hall of Fame (1978), the Mississippi Sports Hall of Fame (1979), and the College Football Hall of Fame (2003).

== Early life ==
Willie Richardson was born November 17, 1939, in Clarksdale, Mississippi. He attended Coleman High School in Greenville, Mississippi, where he gained attention as a pass receiver on the school football team.

== College career ==
Richardson attended Jackson State College, a racially segregated college for African-Americans located in Jackson, Mississippi.

He played at Jackson State from 1959 to 1962.

In 1960, Richardson lead the National Association of Intercollegiate Athletics (NAIA) in pass receiving.

In his final two seasons he led the Tigers to Southwestern Athletic Conference (SWAC) titles in 1961 and 1962. In the latter year, Jackson State claimed the Black College National Championship.

During his 1962 senior season, Richardson finished with 43 receptions for 896 yards (20.8 yards per catch), with 11 touchdowns. He was chosen as an Associated Press Little All-American in that season.

Richardson received a Bachelor of Science degree from Jackson State in 1962.

== Willie Richardson Day ==
Mayor Allen C. Thompson of Jackson proclaimed January 14, 1963, to be "Willie Richardson Day" in honor of the football star's exploits. Initiated with a parade and a celebratory meeting at city hall, the event was lauded in the city's black newspaper as an event when "for the first time since [Jackson's] founding some 150 years ago, by official proclamation a day was set aside, and the entire city called upon to join the observance and celebration honoring a Negro."

Richardson in the parade held in his honor, Jackson, Mississippi, Jan. 14, 1963.

January 14, 1963, was proclaimed "Willie Richardson Day" in Jackson, Mississippi, honored by a special edition of the Jackson Advocate newspaper.

The Richardson Day event was not easy to ignore, with the parade up Capitol Street to city hall featuring the Jackson State College marching band, the band from Utica Junior College, two high school bands, and a number of decorated floats and automobiles which carried school administrators, coaches, and Jackson State players. The official proclamation was read by the mayor and a response given by President Jacob L. Reddix of Jackson State. Richardson then addressed the gathering himself, introducing his mother. Proceedings then moved to the Jackson State campus for a luncheon.

A second assembly was held at 4 pm, addressed by academic and sports leaders, including Jackson State head coach John Merritt and Buddy Young, a former black Colts star now working as a scout for the team.

== Professional career ==
Richardson was selected by the Baltimore Colts in the seventh round of the 1963 NFL draft, with the 89th pick overall. He went to camp in July projected as a flanker or perhaps defensive back. He turned in an identical 4.7 second time in the 40-yard dash as his surprisingly speedy fellow rookie teammate, John Mackey of Syracuse. The other important rookie in Baltimore, new head coach Don Shula, was not long in experimenting with Richardson as a defender, working him out almost exclusively with the offense from the middle of August.

During his 1963 rookie season Richardson was a reserve flanker behind starter Jimmy Orr. He saw game action in 13 games with 3 starts, catching 17 passes for 204 yards (12.0 yards per reception), with no touchdowns and a fumble.

Richardson would not play a truly significant role in the Colts' offense until 1967. In that year he started 13 of 14 games, turning in what would be career highs for receptions (63) and yards gained (860) — an average of 13.7 yards per catch — and scoring 8 touchdowns.

He would continue as the Colts starter at flanker in 1968 and 1969, starting all 28 of the regular season games in those years.

After losing his starting role to Ray Perkins ahead of the 1970 season, on August 20, 1970, Richardson was traded along with a 1971 fourth-round draft pick from the Colts to the Pittsburgh Steelers for wide receiver Roy Jefferson. Attempts to renegotiate his contract led to him being traded to Miami for a fifth-round pick prior to the start of the 1970 season.

Richardson finished his professional career with 195 receptions for 2,950 yards and 25 touchdowns.

== NFL career statistics ==
Legend
	Won the NFL championship
	Led the league
**Bold**	Career high

=== Regular season ===
Year	Team	Games		Receiving				
Year	Team	GP	GS	Rec	Yds	Avg	Lng	TD
1963	BAL	13	3	17	204	12.0	22	0
1964	BAL	10	2	3	42	14.0	16	0
1965	BAL	9	0	1	14	14.0	14	1
1966	BAL	13	1	14	246	17.6	69	2
1967	BAL	14	13	**63**	**860**	13.7	31	**8**
1968	BAL	14	14	37	698	**18.9**	**79**	**8**
1969	BAL	14	14	43	646	15.0	39	3
1970	MIA	10	4	7	67	9.6	27	1
1971	BAL	12	3	10	173	17.3	49	2
		109	54	195	2,950	15.1	79	25

=== Playoffs ===
Year	Team	Games		Receiving				
Year	Team	GP	GS	Rec	Yds	Avg	Lng	TD
1968	BAL	3	3	**15**	**284**	**18.9**	**38**	0
1970	MIA	1	0	2	30	15.0	23	**1**
1971	BAL	1	0	0	0	0.0	0	0
		5	3	17	314	18.5	38	1

== Life after football ==
Later in life Richardson worked in sports radio, hosting an hour-long weekly radio show on an ESPN affiliate. He was also a color analyst for Jackson State football broadcasts on the radio and hosted the Jackson State football coach's radio call-in show when the sport was in season.

He returned to Mississippi in 1980 and worked in the state's tax division for 25 years. He ran for election to the Mississippi Transportation Commission in 1999, winning in the Democratic primary against Credell Calhoun but losing to Republican Dick Hall in the general election.

== Death and legacy ==
Richardson died of unspecified natural causes on February 8, 2016, in Jackson, Mississippi, age 76.

Richardson was inducted into the Jackson State Hall of Fame in 1978, the first such inductee. He was inducted into the Mississippi Sports Hall of Fame a year later.

In 2003, he was inducted into the College Football Hall of Fame.

At the time of his death Richardson was remembered by Mississippi Sports Hall of Fame archivist Rick Cleveland as an excellent athlete to the end and a compassionate person.

"Last time I played golf with him he shot even par at age 75," Cleveland recalled. "Everything he did athletically was smooth. He made everything look easy. He always had a kind word for everybody. Last time I saw him was at the press conference to name Fred McNair the head coach at Alcorn. Here's a Jackson State guy showing up for the head coach at the rival school and he did it just because he said so many times in life people don't get what they deserve. He wanted to be there for Fred because he was getting what he long deserved. He was just a kind guy."

Willie Richardson was the older brother of former NFL wide receiver Gloster Richardson (1942–2020), who played for the Kansas City Chiefs Dallas Cowboys, and Cleveland Browns from 1967 to 1974.
