= Harry Hulmes =

American football executive (1927–2016)

Personal information
- Born: July 20, 1927; Philadelphia, Pennsylvania, U.S.
- Died: February 21, 2016 (aged 88)

Career information
- High school: Northeast (Philadelphia)
- College: University of Pennsylvania

Career history
- Baltimore Orioles (1954) Assistant Business Manager; Bucknell University (1955–1957) Sports Information Director; Baltimore Colts (1958–1969) Business Manager (1958-1960s) Public Relations Manager (1960s) Assistant General Manager (1960s) General Manager (1967–1969); New Orleans Saints (1970–1982) Director of PR (1970s) Assistant General Manager (1970s) Director of Player Personnel (1970s–1980s) Vice President of Administration (1980s); Arizona Wranglers (1983) Chief Operating Officer; New York Giants (1984–2008) Assistant General Manager (1984–1998) Player Personnel Scout (Emeritus) (1999–2008)

Awards and highlights
- 3x NFL champion (1958, 1959, 1968); 3x Super Bowl champion (XXI, XXV, XLII)
- Executive profile at Pro Football Reference

Harry Hulmes III (July 20, 1927 – February 21, 2016) was an American sports executive in the National Football League (NFL) and Major League Baseball (MLB). His career in sports spanned six decades, from 1954 to 2008, including as general manager of the Baltimore Colts from 1967 to 1969.

== Early life ==
Harry Hulmes was born on July 20, 1927, in Philadelphia, Pennsylvania. He attended Northeast High School before entering the United States Navy in World War II. He served in the Navy for three years as a radarman.

Upon completing his military service, Hulmes attended the University of Pennsylvania where he earned a degree in journalism.

== Executive career ==
=== Early career ===
Hulmes began his career in sports administration with the Baltimore Orioles, where he was the Assistant Business Manager during the 1954 season.

After leaving the Orioles, Hulmes went to Bucknell University in Lewisburg, Pennsylvania, where he served as the university's Sports Information Director for three years, from 1955 to 1957.

=== Baltimore Colts ===
In 1958, he began his NFL career. He became a Business Manager for the Baltimore Colts. He was also a public relations director with the Colts. In 1967, he became the General Manager for them. They had a 11-1-2 record in his first season. The next year they had a 13–1 record and made the playoffs. He made it to the Super Bowl, but lost 16–7 to the New York Jets. In his final year as a General Manager, he had a 8-5-1 record. He was demoted to assistant general manager when Don Klosterman was hired by the Colts on January 6, 1970.

=== New Orleans Saints ===
After 1969, he went to the New Orleans Saints. He was with the Saints for 13 seasons. He had numerous roles in his 13 seasons, they included: Assistant General Manager, Director of PR, Director of Player Personnel, and VP of Administration.

=== Arizona Wranglers ===
In 1983, he went to the Arizona Wranglers of the USFL. He was their Chief Operating Officer in his one season with them.

=== New York Giants ===
In 1984, he went to the New York Giants. He became their Assistant General Manager. He was the Assistant from 1984 to 1998. He retired in 1998 but continued to work with them until 2008 as a scout. He finished his career after 2008. In his career he won 5 combined Championships and Super Bowls.

== Death ==
Hulmes died on February 21, 2016, at the age of 88.
