= David Kelly (baseball announcer) =

American sportscaster (born 1967)

David Scott Kelly (born October 5, 1967, in Cleveland, Ohio) is an American sportscaster. He has been a sports anchor/reporter at KVOA since September 2019. Prior to that, Kelly spent seven-plus years at Raycom Media's Tucson News Now which is a shared-services agreement that involves Fox affiliate KMSB-TV and CBS affiliate KOLD-TV in Tucson, Arizona. David joined the Fox 11 Sports Force in July 2011 and transitioned to Tucson News Now when the SSA went into effect in February 2012. He currently anchors sports primarily on the weekends at News 4 Tucson.

Prior to transitioning to television, Kelly served for two-plus seasons as an anchor for the University of Arizona Wildcats Radio Network. Kelly hosted the pre-game, halftime, and post-game shows during all Arizona Wildcats football and men's basketball broadcasts as well as served as a play-by-play announcer for the Arizona baseball and softball teams.

Kelly spent three seasons (2005–2007) doing radio and TV play-by-play for the Memphis Redbirds of the Triple-A Pacific Coast League.

He is the son of NFL Hall of Fame running back Leroy Kelly, who starred with the Cleveland Browns from 1964 to 1973. His uncle Pat Kelly played Major League Baseball for 15 seasons (1967–1981) with the Minnesota Twins, Kansas City Royals, Chicago White Sox, Baltimore Orioles, and Cleveland Indians.

Kelly began his career in August 1991 as sports director at KTIP-AM 1450 in Porterville, CA. The station at the time was owned by Oakland A's announcer Monte Moore.

His first professional baseball experience came broadcasting games for the Class-A Visalia Oaks during the 1991 and 1992 seasons. He later moved to KGEO-AM 1230 in Bakersfield where he became the voice of the Bakersfield Dodgers.

Kelly advanced to Double-A baseball in 1995 where he broadcast games for the Port City Roosters (Wilmington, North Carolina) for two seasons.

He was a mainstay at 50000-watt clear channel powerhouse WTAM-AM 1100 in Cleveland from 1997 to 2005. He started in the news department as an overnight anchor/morning drive reporter. Eventually moving to sports as an update anchor, beat reporter for the Cleveland Browns, and talk show host.

He has won five Associated Press first place awards for his work in radio, including being named Ohio's Best Sports Broadcaster in 2005.

Kelly's baseball style is a mixture of old school and new school. He loves to interweave stories about players around his play-by-play call.

His home run call is Goodnight Irene and when the bases are loaded it's a Graaaand Slaaaamma. If a player has a big RBI night, or drives in a lot of "ribs" (as Kelly refers to them), he's been known to offer that player a wet nap for his performance.

Kelly has adopted Arch McDonald's famous phrase for a fastball right down the middle of the plate, "right down Broadway", and changes it to fit a popular boulevard in whatever city he is currently calling games. Some of those streets that fastballs have whizzed down along the way have included Truxtun (Bakersfield), Oleander (Wilmington), Beale Street (Memphis), and Speedway (Tucson).

Kelly attended University High School (Normal), Illinois (1986) and graduated from the University of Southern California in 1990.
