= Earl Morrall =

American football player (1934–2014)

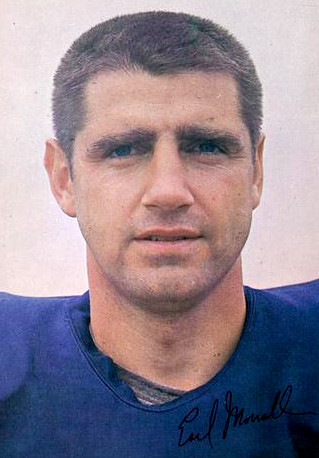
- Morrall in 1965

No. 11, 10, 14, 15
- Position: Quarterback

Personal information
- Born: May 17, 1934; Muskegon, Michigan, U.S.
- Died: April 25, 2014 (aged 79); Fort Lauderdale, Florida, U.S.
- Listed height: 6 ft 1 in (1.85 m)
- Listed weight: 205 lb (93 kg)

Career information
- High school: Muskegon
- College: Michigan State (1952–1955)
- NFL draft: 1956: 1st round, 2nd overall pick

Career history

Playing
- San Francisco 49ers (1956); Pittsburgh Steelers (1957–1958); Detroit Lions (1958–1964); New York Giants (1965–1967); Baltimore Colts (1968–1971); Miami Dolphins (1972–1976)

Coaching
- Miami (FL) (1979–1982) Quarterbacks coach

Awards and highlights
- 3× Super Bowl champion (V, VII, VIII); NFL champion (1968); NFL Most Valuable Player (1968); NFL Comeback Player of the Year (1972); 2× First-team All-Pro (1968, 1972); 2× Pro Bowl (1957, 1968); NFL passer rating leader (1972); NFL passing touchdowns leader (1968); Dolphins Walk of Fame (2012); National champion (1952); Consensus All-America (1955); First-team All-Big Ten (1955)

Career NFL statistics
- Passing attempts: 2,689
- Passing completions: 1,379
- Completion percentage: 51.3%
- TD–INT: 161–148
- Passing yards: 20,809
- Passer rating: 74.1
- Stats at Pro Football Reference

Earl Morrall

Mayor of Davie, Florida
- In office 1992 – July 6, 1992

Member of Davie City Council
- In office 1989 – July 6, 1992

Personal details
- Party: Republican

Earl Edwin Morrall (/ˈmɔːrəl/; May 17, 1934 – April 25, 2014) was an American professional football player who was a quarterback in the National Football League (NFL) for 21 seasons. He was the last remaining player from the 1950s still active in the NFL. He started for six teams, most notably the Baltimore Colts and Miami Dolphins. He became known as one of the greatest backup quarterbacks in NFL history, having served in the capacity for two Hall of Fame quarterbacks in Johnny Unitas and Bob Griese. An injury to Unitas in 1968 saw Morrall step in to become the starter; he guided the Colts to a 13–1 record and won league MVP. He also led them to their first NFL Championship win in nine years before ineffective play in Super Bowl III saw him benched for Unitas. Two years later, in Super Bowl V, Morrall came off the bench for an injured Unitas and kept the Colts in the game before they ultimately won on a last-second field goal. In his first season with Miami in 1972, he came off the bench when Griese became injured early in the year, with Morrall winning all nine starts; Morrall started the first two playoff games, with Griese playing in each game before being named the starter for Super Bowl VII, where the Dolphins completed the only perfect season in NFL history.

== Amateur career ==
Morrall led Muskegon High School in Muskegon, Michigan to a state football championship in 1951 and state baseball championship in 1952 (where he stole home). He attended Michigan State University, where he played under head coaches Biggie Munn and Duffy Daugherty. He played three seasons for the Michigan State Spartans football team, leading them to a 9–1 record in the 1955 season. He capped his senior year with a victory over the UCLA Bruins in the 1956 Rose Bowl. Morrall also played baseball at Michigan State and played in the College World Series as a shortstop and third baseman. He was offered the opportunity to play professional baseball but chose instead to play football.

== Professional career ==
In 21 seasons on the professional gridiron, Morrall played for six different teams, beginning with his rookie year in 1956 as the second overall selection in the draft, taken by the San Francisco 49ers. He made appearances in the first four games, and started in the fifth game of the year on October 28, completing 7 of 12 passes for 148 yards with a touchdown and an interception. Morrall started the next three games before appearing sporadically in two further games. In total, he went 38 of 78 passing, with 621 yards with a touchdown and six interceptions. Appearing as a punter on special teams, he made 45 punts for 1,705 yards.

On September 16, 1957, he was traded along with guard Mike Sandusky to the Pittsburgh Steelers in exchange for linebacker Marv Matuszak and two first-round draft picks. He would appear in all twelve games that year for the Steelers (making eleven starts), helping them to a 6–6 record while throwing for 1,900 yards with 11 touchdowns and 12 interceptions. He started the first two games for Pittsburgh in 1958 before being traded to the Detroit Lions as part of a deal to obtain future Hall of Fame quarterback Bobby Layne, where he made sporadic appearances in six games for the Lions that same season. Morrall would spend the next six seasons with the Lions. His best performance with the team came in 1963, throwing for 24 touchdowns and more than 2,600 yards. The following year, he suffered a season-ending shoulder injury in an October 18 contest against the Chicago Bears.

After spending the off-season rehabilitating from his injury, Morrall was dealt by the Lions to the New York Giants in exchange for Mike Lucci (who had been acquired from the Cleveland Browns), Darrell Dess, and a draft pick as part of a three-team transaction on August 30, 1965. The Browns obtained defensive back Erich Barnes from the Giants to complete the trade. Enduring his role during the Giants' rebuilding phase, Morrall threw for 2,446 yards and 22 touchdowns that season, but after breaking his wrist in 1966 but only saw spot duty over the next two years after the Giants acquired Fran Tarkenton. His tenure in New York ended when he was traded to the Baltimore Colts for an undisclosed draft choice on August 25, 1968.

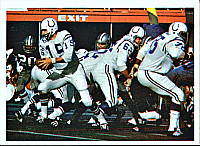
Morrall (left) running a play for the Colts in Super Bowl V

In 1968, Morrall turned in the best performance of his career. As the replacement for an injured Johnny Unitas (who had won league MVP the previous season), the veteran quarterback guided the Colts to a dominant 13–1 record, passing for 2,909 yards and a league-leading 26 touchdown passes, earning him the league MVP honor. Baltimore won the NFL Championship with a 34–0 road shutout in Cleveland, but were upset in Super Bowl III by the New York Jets; in that game, Morrall was benched for Unitas midway through the third quarter after throwing three interceptions.

Prior to the 1969 season, Morrall briefly considered retiring from pro football to accept a lucrative business offer, but re-signed with the Colts on September 18, three days before the start of the regular season, despite Unitas reclaiming the starting quarterback job. The following season, Morrall had a chance to redeem his past woes in Super Bowl V. With the Colts trailing the Dallas Cowboys 13–6 in the second quarter, Unitas was knocked out of the game with a rib injury. Morrall was tasked to step in and completed 7 of 15 passes for 147 yards and an interception. However, a series of turnovers (Craig Morton, his counterpart, threw 3 interceptions, with the last two resulting in eventual Baltimore scores) allowed the Colts to stay in the game, and Jim O'Brien kicked a 32-yard field goal with seconds remaining to give the Colts a 16–13 victory. He started the first nine games of the 1971 season for the defending champion Colts (appearing in one further game). His passing statistics that season totaled 1,210 yards with 7 touchdowns and 12 interceptions as the Colts posted a 10–4 record, with Unitas handling the duties for the playoffs.

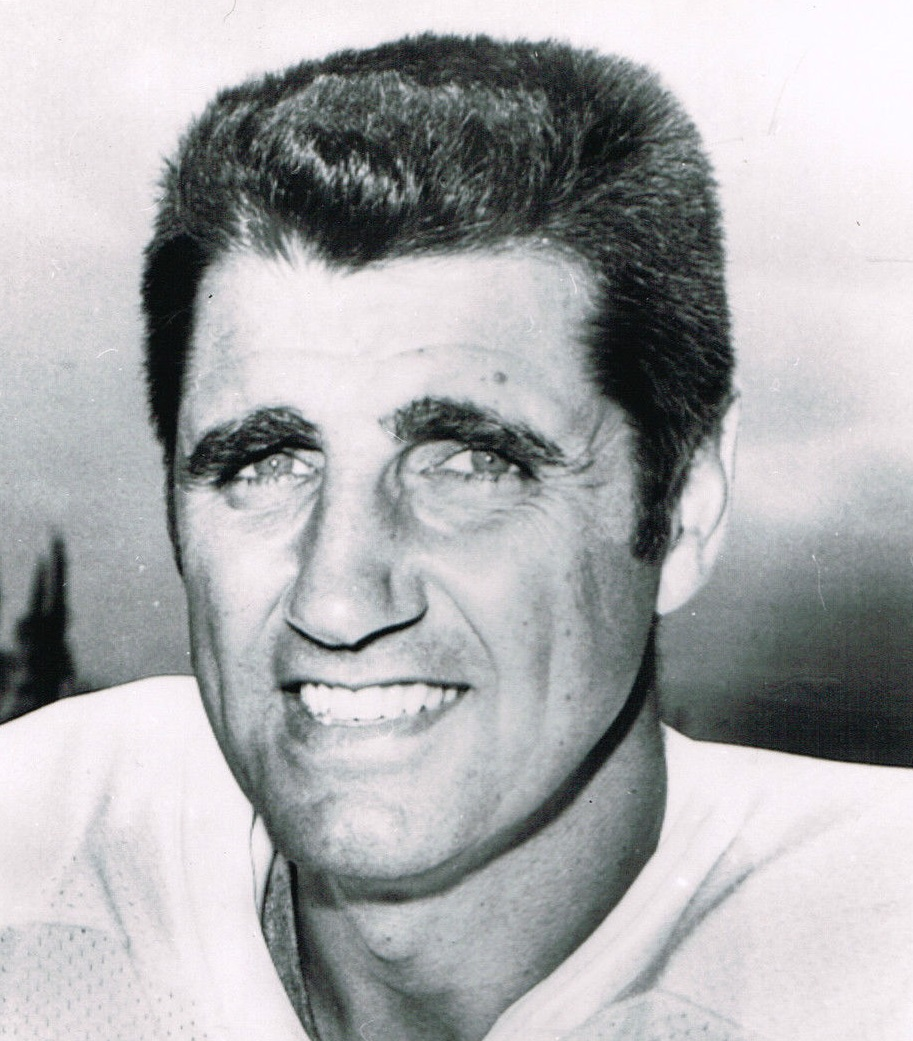
Morrall in 1976

In 1972, Morrall joined the Miami Dolphins, reuniting with head coach Don Shula, who had led Baltimore through 1969. After starting quarterback Bob Griese was hurt during the October 15 home win over the San Diego Chargers, Morrall stepped in relief for the team, and he completed 8 of 10 passes for 86 yards with 2 touchdowns in a 24–10 Miami victory. With Miami at a 5–0 record, he proceeded to start the nine remaining games of the season and won them all, throwing 11 touchdown passes to 7 interceptions with 1,360 passing yards as the Dolphins were buoyed mostly by their rushing attack. The 1972 Dolphins achieved the first undefeated regular season in the NFL since 1942. In the playoffs, Morrall started the divisional round game at home against the Cleveland Browns and completed 6 of 13 passes for 88 yards; the Dolphins won 20–14 on the strength of a blocked punt returned by Charlie Babb, two field goals, and a Jim Kiick touchdown. One week later, Morrall started the AFC Championship Game against the Pittsburgh Steelers, passing 7 of 11 for 51 yards with a touchdown and an interception. He was later relieved by Griese in the 21–17 road victory. Griese would then start two weeks later in Super Bowl VII, a 14–7 victory over the Washington Redskins, winning the franchise's first Super Bowl title. In total, Morrall filled in for 11 games in place of an injured Griese, winning all 11. Together, Morrall and Griese won all three postseason games, closing out the only perfect season in NFL history, at 17–0. Over the next four seasons with Miami, Morrall was relegated to the back-up position once again. He would make occasional appearances, featuring only three starts. In 1973, the Dolphins won their second consecutive Super Bowl, with Griese at quarterback.

Morrall announced his retirement from professional football on May 2, 1977. Until Doug Flutie and Vinny Testaverde almost thirty years later, Morrall was the oldest quarterback to start and win an NFL game. In 21 seasons, Morrall played in 255 games, completing 1,379 passes for 20,809 yards and 161 touchdowns with an 63–36–3 (.632) record as a starter. In 2015, as part of the team's 50-year anniversary, Morrall was selected as one of the fifty greatest players in Miami Dolphins history.

Morrall's career accolades include Pro Bowl appearances following the 1957 and 1968 seasons, as well as being named the NFL MVP in 1968. He would finish as the MVP runner-up in 1972. He led the league in passing in 1968 and led all AFC quarterbacks in passing in 1972. In 2018, the Professional Football Researchers Association named Morrall to the PFRA Hall of Very Good Class of 2018.

== NFL career statistics ==
Legend
	AP NFL MVP
	Won the Super Bowl
	Won the NFL championship
	Led the league
**Bold**	Career high

=== Regular season ===
Year	Team	Games			Passing								Rushing				Sacks		Fum
Year	Team	GP	GS	Record	Cmp	Att	Pct	Yds	Avg	TD	Int	Rtg	Att	Yds	Avg	TD	Sck	SckY	Fum
1956	SF	12	4	1–3	38	78	48.7	621	8.0	1	6	48.1	6	10	1.7	0	—	36	1
1957	PIT	12	11	6–5	139	289	48.1	1,900	6.6	11	12	64.9	**41**	81	2.0	**2**	—	**274**	**12**
1958	PIT	2	2	0–2	16	46	34.8	275	6.0	1	7	23.6	4	39	9.8	0	—	17	1
1958	DET	9	0	—	9	32	28.1	188	5.9	4	2	65.1	7	41	5.9	0	—	31	0
1959	DET	12	5	2–3	65	137	47.4	1,102	8.0	5	6	69.1	26	**112**	4.3	0	—	228	7
1960	DET	12	2	2–0	32	49	**65.3**	423	8.6	4	3	94.2	10	37	3.7	1	8	55	3
1961	DET	13	6	4–2	69	150	46.0	909	6.1	7	9	56.2	20	86	4.3	0	10	74	6
1962	DET	**14**	0	—	32	52	61.5	449	8.6	4	4	82.9	17	65	3.8	1	5	35	1
1963	DET	**14**	10	4–5–1	174	**328**	53.0	2,621	8.0	24	14	86.2	26	105	4.0	1	**29**	243	5
1964	DET	6	3	3–0	50	91	54.9	588	6.5	4	3	75.7	10	70	7.0	0	10	97	3
1965	NYG	**14**	**14**	7–7	155	302	51.3	2,446	8.1	22	12	86.3	17	52	3.1	0	27	214	5
1966	NYG	7	7	1–5–1	71	151	47.0	1,105	7.3	7	12	54.1	5	12	2.4	0	18	152	3
1967	NYG	8	0	—	13	24	54.2	181	7.5	3	1	**100.9**	4	11	2.8	1	8	59	0
1968	BAL	**14**	**14**	13–1	**182**	317	57.4	**2,909**	9.2	**26**	**17**	93.2	11	18	1.6	1	24	180	7
1969	BAL	9	2	1–0–1	46	99	46.5	755	7.6	5	7	60.0	0	0	—	0	7	63	0
1970	BAL	**14**	1	1–0	51	93	54.8	792	8.5	9	4	97.6	2	6	3.0	0	14	131	2
1971	BAL	**14**	9	7–2	84	167	50.3	1,210	7.2	7	12	58.2	6	13	2.2	0	11	89	3
1972	MIA	**14**	9	**9–0**	83	150	55.3	1,360	9.1	11	7	91.0	17	67	3.9	1	14	114	3
1973	MIA	**14**	1	0–1	17	38	44.7	253	6.7	0	4	27.5	1	9	9.0	0	2	18	0
1974	MIA	**14**	1	1–0	17	27	63.0	301	**11.1**	2	3	86.1	1	11	**11.0**	0	3	16	0
1975	MIA	13	1	1–0	26	43	60.5	273	6.3	3	2	82.8	4	33	8.3	0	4	27	1
1976	MIA	**14**	0	—	10	26	38.5	148	5.7	1	1	54.6	0	0	—	0	3	29	0
Career		255	102	63–36–3	1,379	2,689	51.3	20,809	7.7	161	148	74.1	235	878	3.7	8	197	2,182	63

=== Playoffs ===
Year	Team	Games			Passing								Rushing				Sacks		Fum
Year	Team	GP	GS	Record	Cmp	Att	Pct	Yds	Avg	TD	Int	Rtg	Att	Yds	Avg	TD	Sck	SckY	Fum
1968	BAL	3	3	2–1	**30**	**64**	46.9	**520**	8.1	**2**	**5**	52.9	3	−2	−0.7	0	**4**	**35**	0
1970	BAL	3	0	—	7	15	46.7	147	**9.8**	0	1	54.0	1	1	**1.0**	0	0	0	**1**
1971	BAL	2	0	—	0	0	—	0	—	0	0	—	0	0	—	0	0	0	0
1972	MIA	3	2	2–0	13	24	**54.2**	139	5.8	1	1	**67.9**	**4**	**3**	0.8	0	**4**	14	0
1973	MIA	3	0	—	0	0	—	0	—	0	0	—	0	0	—	0	0	0	0
1974	MIA	1	0	—	0	0	—	0	—	0	0	—	0	0	—	0	0	0	0
Career		15	5	4–1	50	103	48.5	806	7.8	3	7	56.5	8	2	0.3	0	8	49	1

== Personal life ==
During the 1960s, Morrall sold automobiles in Detroit during the NFL offseasons.

Morrall became the quarterback coach at the University of Miami in 1979. During his time there, he worked with Jim Kelly, Bernie Kosar, Vinny Testaverde and Mark Richt. In 1989, he was elected to the Davie, Florida city council and eventually became mayor. Morrall resigned as mayor to run for the Florida House of Representatives District 97 seat as a Republican in 1992 but lost the election.

During a 1989 interview, Morrall was asked what it took to come off the bench and be an effective quarterback and team leader. His response was, "When you get the chance to do the job, you have to do the job. That's all there is to it."

He died on April 25, 2014, at his son's home in Fort Lauderdale, Florida. He was 79. After death, examination of his brain disclosed that he had grade 4 (the most serious stage) chronic traumatic encephalopathy. He is one of at least 345 NFL players to be diagnosed after death with this disease, which is caused by repeated hits to the head.

== In popular culture ==
In 2026, Morrall's name gained attention in Spain due to the television game show Pasapalabra, after becoming the final answer in el rosco from Rosa Rodríguez, granting her a €2,716,000 jackpot (the show's all-time highest). The difficulty of the question, as American football has little following in Spain, led to criticism in social networks, with theories of the game being rigged, especially after Rodríguez stated his approval with the taxes paid from the prize. Rodríguez assured she had checked the answer during her training, and her rival, Manuel Pascual, affirmed it as well.
