= 1968 NFL Championship Game =

Coordinates: 41.506°N 81.700°W

- 1968 NFL Championship Game official program
Baltimore Colts (Coastal, Western) (13–1)	Cleveland Browns (Century, Eastern) (10–4)
34	0
Head coach: Don Shula	Head coach: Blanton Collier
	1	2	3	4	Total
BAL	0	17	7	10	34
CLE	0	0	0	0	0
- Date: December 29, 1968
- Stadium: Cleveland Municipal Stadium; Cleveland, Ohio
- MVP: Tom Matte (Halfback; Baltimore)
- Attendance: 78,410

TV in the United States
- Network: CBS
- Announcers: Jack Buck, Pat Summerall, and Tom Brookshier

Radio in the United States
- Network: CBS
- Announcers: Bob Reynolds

Location in the United States

The 1968 NFL Championship Game was the 36th annual championship game. The winner of the game represented the National Football League (NFL) in the third AFL–NFL World Championship Game (also called the Super Bowl). The NFL title game was held December 29 at Cleveland Municipal Stadium in Cleveland, Ohio.

== Background ==
The Baltimore Colts (13–1) won the Coastal Division and defeated the Minnesota Vikings 24–14 in the Western Conference championship game. The Colts were led by head coach Don Shula and reserve quarterback Earl Morrall. This was the Colts' fourth championship game appearance since joining the NFL in 1953, with a 2–1 record in the title game.

Cleveland Browns (10–4) were the only team to defeat Baltimore during the regular season, and won the Century Division. The Browns defeated the Dallas Cowboys 31–20 in the Eastern Conference championship game. The Browns were led by head coach Blanton Collier, running back Leroy Kelly, and quarterback Bill Nelsen. This was the Browns' tenth NFL championship game appearance since joining the NFL in 1950, with a 4–5 record in the title game.

Cleveland won the regular season game 30–20 ten weeks earlier in Baltimore, but the Colts were six-point favorites for the championship game. The 1968 game was a rematch of the 1964 title game and at the same venue, but with far different results. Both championship games were shutouts the Browns won in '64; 27–0, while the Colts won this time.

This was the sixth and final NFL championship game held at Cleveland Municipal Stadium, although it hosted the 1986 AFC championship game.

== Game summary ==
Baltimore held Cleveland to just 173 total yards and avenged their only regular season loss of the year with a dominating shutout win. Cleveland crossed midfield only twice, just once in each half, and kicker Don Cockroft missed three field goal attempts.

The game began promising for Cleveland as Browns defensive back Ben Davis wiped out a scoring chance for Baltimore on their opening drive when he intercepted a pass from Earl Morrall on the Cleveland 14-yard line. The Browns then drove to the Colts 35-yard line, with Bill Nelsen completing passes to Paul Warfield and Milt Morin for gains of 16 and 22 yards. However, Nelsen was dropped for a 7-yard loss on first down by Fred Miller and Ordell Braase. He managed to lead the team back to the 35 by the time they got to 4th down, but Cockroft 42-yard field goal attempt was blocked by defensive tackle Bubba Smith. The Colts then took over and drove to a 3–0 lead on a 28-yard field goal by Lou Michaels.

In the second quarter, Baltimore completely took over the game. Colts running back Tom Matte scored on a 1-yard touchdown run, giving the Colts a 10–0 lead. Later on, the Colts seemed to blow a scoring chance when tight end John Mackey lost a fumble that was recovered by Erich Barnes and returned 9 yards to the Browns 23. But on the next play, linebacker Mike Curtis intercepted a pass from Nelsen on the 33, leading to Matte's 12-yard touchdown run that gave Baltimore a 17–0 lead going into halftime.

After halftime, Cleveland forced a punt and got the ball on their own 40, where they proceeded to drive to the Colts 38. But once again their drive stalled and Cockroft missed a 50-yard field goal attempt. He got another chance as a result of a penalty on the play, but missed again from 45 yards on his next attempt. After an exchange of punts, Baltimore got the ball on the Cleveland 48 and drove to a 24–0 lead on Matte's third touchdown of the day. Meanwhile, Nelsen was benched and replaced by Frank Ryan, but this did nothing to improve Cleveland's misfortunes. On his first play, he fumbled the snap, and linebacker Don Shinnick recovered the ball on the Browns 20-yard line, leading to Michaels' second field goal, giving Baltimore a 27–0 lead on the second play of the 4th quarter. Ryan completed just 2 of 6 pass attempts for the rest of the game, while Colts running back Timmy Brown scored the final points on a 4-yard touchdown run.

Matte went to Shaw High School in East Cleveland, Ohio, and was a former Ohio State quarterback. He was the sole offensive star of the game, rushing for 88 yards and 3 touchdowns, while also catching 2 passes for 15 yards.

This was the final game for Browns wide receiver Tommy McDonald.

=== Scoring summary ===
Baltimore Colts 34, Cleveland Browns 0

Quarter	1	2	3	4	Total
Colts	0	17	7	10	34
Browns	0	0	0	0	0

at Cleveland Stadium, Cleveland, Ohio

- Date: December 29, 1968
- Game time: 2:35 p.m. EST
- Game weather: 27 °F (−3 °C), wind 22 mph (35 km/h), wind chill 13 °F (−11 °C), relative humidity 60%
- Game attendance: 78,410
- TV announcers (CBS): Jack Buck, Pat Summerall, Tom Brookshier
- Pro-Football-Reference.com

Game information

- First quarter
  - no scoring
- Second quarter
  - BAL – Lou Michaels 28-yard field goal. Colts 3–0
  - BAL – Tom Matte 1-yard rush (Michaels kick). Colts 10–0
  - BAL – Tom Matte 12-yard rush (Michaels kick). Colts 17–0
- Third quarter
  - BAL – Tom Matte 2-yard run (Michaels kick). Colts 24–0
- Fourth quarter
  - BAL – Lou Michaels 10-yard field goal. Colts 27–0
  - BAL – Timmy Brown 4-yard rush (Michaels kick). Colts 34–0

Top passers

- BAL – Earl Morrall – 11/25, 169 yards, 1 INT
- CLE – Bill Nelsen – 11/26, 132 yards, 2 INT

Top rushers

- BAL – Tom Matte – 17 rushes, 88 yards, 3 TD
- CLE – Leroy Kelly – 13 rushes, 28 yards

Top receivers

- BAL – Willie Richardson – 3 receptions, 78 yards
- CLE – Milt Morin – 3 receptions, 41 yards

== Officials ==
- Referee: (23) Harry "Bud" Brubaker
- Umpire: (51) Lou Palazzi
- Head linesman: (26) Ed Marion
- Line judge: (24) Bruce Alford
- Back judge: (47) Ralph Vandenberg
- Field judge: (34) Fritz Graf

The NFL had six game officials in 1968; the side judge was added in 1978.

== Players' shares ==
The Colts players each received $10,000 and the Browns players about $7,000 each.

== See also ==
- 1968 NFL playoffs
- 1968 NFL season
- History of the NFL championship
- 1968 American Football League Championship Game

== Video ==
- You Tube – 1968 AFL & NFL Championship Games (Highlights) – from NBC pre-game for Super Bowl III w/ Curt Gowdy
- – 1968 NFL Championship Game – CBS broadcast: 3rd and 4th quarters plus postgame
