= Erich Barnes =

American football player (1935–2022)

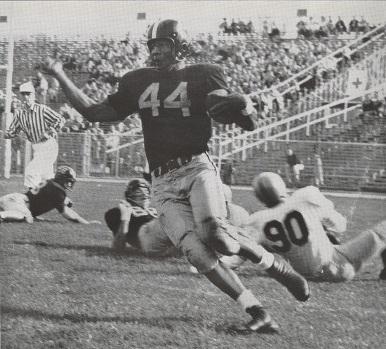
- Barnes with Purdue c. 1957

No. 24, 49, 40
- Position: Defensive back

Personal information
- Born: July 4, 1935; Elkhart, Indiana, U.S.
- Died: April 29, 2022 (aged 86); Hastings-on-Hudson, New York, U.S.
- Listed height: 6 ft 2 in (1.88 m)
- Listed weight: 201 lb (91 kg)

Career information
- High school: Elkhart Central
- College: Purdue
- NFL draft: 1958: 4th round, 42nd overall pick

Career history
- Chicago Bears (1958–1960); New York Giants (1961–1964); Cleveland Browns (1965–1971)

Awards and highlights
- First-team All-Pro (1961); 3× Second-team All-Pro (1959, 1962, 1964); 6× Pro Bowl (1959, 1961–1964, 1968); Cleveland Browns Legends; 86th greatest New York Giant of all-time

Career NFL statistics
- Interceptions: 45
- Interception yards: 853
- Touchdowns: 7
- Stats at Pro Football Reference

Erich Theodore Barnes (/ˈiːrɪtʃ/ EE-ritch; July 4, 1935 – April 29, 2022) was an American professional football player who was a defensive back in the National Football League (NFL). He played college football for the Purdue Boilermakers (1956–1958), where he was a two-way player. In the NFL, he was a six-time Pro Bowler and a four-time All-Pro selection, including first-team honors in 1961.

== Early life ==
Barnes was born in Elkhart, Indiana, on July 4, 1935. His father, Sylvester, worked as a real estate investor; his mother, Lura, was a housewife. He attended Elkhart Central High School in his hometown. He then studied at Purdue University, where he played offensive and defensive halfback, left end, and cornerback for the Purdue Boilermakers. He registered 257 rushing yards on 62 carries, 319 yards on 20 receptions, 136 yards on seven kickoff returns, and 86 return yards off of his five interceptions during his time with the Boilermakers. He was one of the favorite receiving targets of Len Dawson, a future Pro Football Hall of Famer, but cornerback was his best position. He was drafted by the Chicago Bears in the fourth round (42nd overall selection) of the 1958 NFL draft.

== Career ==
Barnes made his NFL debut with the Bears on October 12, 1958, at the age of 23, in a 28–6 win over the San Francisco 49ers. He was later traded to the New York Giants in 1961. In his first season with New York, he intercepted a pass against the Dallas Cowboys and returned it 102 yards for a touchdown, setting a Giants' record and tying the then-NFL record for the longest interception return. He also earned NFL first-team honors that year. The Giants went on to face the Green Bay Packers in the 1962 NFL Championship Game, having lost 37–0 to the same team in the previous year's title game. They lost again to Lombardi's Packers on a fiercely windy and cold day in Yankee Stadium. Barnes set up the only scoring for the Giants when he blocked a punt recovered by teammate Jim Collier in the end zone in a 16–7 loss.

After the 1964 season, the Giants traded him to the Cleveland Browns – his favorite team as a child – for linebacker Mike Lucci and a 1966 third-round draft pick which the Giants then traded to Detroit for quarterback Earl Morrall. This trade further aggravated the demise of a once stellar Giants defense that had already lost standouts Sam Huff and Dick Modzelewski, who was also traded to the Browns and an integral component of their 1964 NFL championship team after the 1963 season. During his time with the Browns, Barnes was known for standing at the goalpost (then stationed at the goal line) and blocking field goal attempts. This practice was later outlawed in the NFL. He ended his career with 45 interceptions, returning seven for touchdowns. During his NFL career, he was selected to the Pro Bowl six times and was an All-Pro selection four times.

== Legacy ==
Barnes was known as an aggressive, physical player. In 2012, the Cleveland Plain Dealer's Mike Pettica ranked him as the No. 63 player in Browns' history (counting only what players did playing for Cleveland). The Professional Football Researchers Association named Barnes to the PRFA Hall of Very Good Class of 2013.

Barnes was elected to the Indiana Football Hall of Fame in 1986, and the Purdue University Intercollegiate Athletics Hall of Fame in 2009.

== Later life ==
After retiring from professional football in 1971, Barnes went on to work in the New York City area as a corporate special events planner.

== Personal life and death ==
Barnes married Violet Ward; the couple remained together until his death. Erich had three daughters; Charissa, Djuna, and Tessa. In 1963, he appeared as one of the impostors on the panel game show To Tell the Truth, claiming to be a sentinel at the Tomb of the Unknown Soldier.

Barnes died on April 29, 2022, at a hospital near Hastings-on-Hudson, New York, aged 86, following an unspecified lengthy illness.
