= 1968 NFL season =

American football season

Regular season
- Duration: September 14 – December 15, 1968

Playoffs
- East Champions: Cleveland Browns
- West Champions: Baltimore Colts

Championship Game
- Champions: Baltimore Colts

NFL teams: Coastal, Central, Century, Capitol

The 1968 NFL season was the 49th regular season of the National Football League. Per the agreement made during the 1967 realignment, the New Orleans Saints and the New York Giants switched divisions; the Saints joined the Century Division while the Giants became part of the Capitol Division.

The season ended when the Baltimore Colts defeated the Cleveland Browns in the NFL Championship Game, only to be defeated by the American Football League's New York Jets in Super Bowl III 16–7 at the Orange Bowl in Miami. Subsequently, it was the first time in the history of professional football in which the NFL champion was not crowned as the world champion. One year later, this feat would be repeated, as the AFL champion Kansas City Chiefs defeated the NFL champion Minnesota Vikings in Super Bowl IV.

== Draft ==
The 1968 NFL/AFL draft, the first time that both leagues conducted a combined common draft, was held January 30–31, 1968, at New York City's Belmont Plaza Hotel. With the first pick, the Minnesota Vikings selected offensive tackle Ron Yary from the University of Southern California.

== Deaths ==
- January 13 – Pete Calac, age 74. Native American who was a former two-way player at tackle. Played for the Oorang Indians, Buffalo Bisons, and Canton Bulldogs.
- June 18 – Bruce McLenna, age 26. Played one year at running back for the Detroit Lions in 1966. Was serving in the Missouri National Guard when he was killed in a car crash.
- June 29 – Paddy Driscoll, age 73. Quarterback for the Chicago Cardinals and Chicago Bears, a member of the NFL 1920's all decade team. Elected to the Pro Football Hall Of Fame in 1965.
- November 24 - Chick Jagade, Age 41. Running back for the Baltimore Colts of the AAFC, the Cleveland Browns and Chicago Bears of the NFL. Two-time Pro Bowl player.

== Division races ==
The Eastern Conference was split into the Capitol and Century Divisions, and the Western Conference had the Coastal and Central Divisions. In the past, from 1933 to 1966, if two teams were tied for the division lead at season's end, a one-game playoff was conducted to break the tie. Starting in 1967, a tiebreaking system was implemented that started with net points in head-to-head competition, followed by the team that had less recently played in a title game. As such, only one team in a division would be the division winner, even if the won-lost record was the same.

=== Colts and Rams ===
For the second straight season, the Colts and Rams waged a tight season long battle for the Coastal Division title. In 1967, the Rams defeated the Colts in the season's final game to claim the title. They appeared headed for a similar showdown in 1968 (they were scheduled to face each other in the season finale in L.A.), as the Rams entered week 13 with a 10–1–1 record while the Colts were 11–1–0. But in the next to last game, the Rams were upset by the Chicago Bears 17–16 in what was known as "the lost down game." The biggest play in the game came when the Rams completed a second down pass to get into field goal range in the final minute, but the play was wiped out by a holding penalty. It should have remained second down due to the Bears accepting the penalty on the Rams, but the referees forgot to reset the down marker. After two incomplete passes, the Rams lined up for a fourth down attempt, but referee Norm Schachter and his crew waived the Bears offense onto the field on a change of possession; the Bears ran out the clock and the Colts (who won the day before) clinched the division. In the now-meaningless season finale, the Colts won 28–24.

=== Central Division ===
The Bears' aforementioned win over the Rams put them in position to clinch the Central Division title with a win in the season finale vs. the Packers at Wrigley Field. When Chicago lost 28–27 and the Vikings defeated the Eagles 24–17 at Franklin Field, Minnesota was in the playoffs for the first time with the first of its ten Central division championships between 1968 and 1978. (Had Chicago and Minnesota finished tied, the Bears would have advanced due to their head-to-head sweep.)

| Week | Capitol | | Century | | Coastal | | Central | |
|---|---|---|---|---|---|---|---|---|
| 1 | Dallas* | 1–0–0 | Cleveland | 1–0–0 | Baltimore* | 1–0–0 | Minnesota* | 1–0–0 |
| 2 | Dallas* | 2–0–0 | Cleveland* | 1–1–0 | Baltimore* | 2–0–0 | Minnesota* | 2–0–0 |
| 3 | Dallas* | 3–0–0 | Cleveland* | 1–2–0 | Baltimore* | 3–0–0 | Minnesota* | 2–1–0 |
| 4 | Dallas | 4–0–0 | Cleveland | 2–2–0 | Baltimore* | 4–0–0 | Minnesota | 3–1–0 |
| 5 | Dallas | 5–0–0 | St. Louis* | 2–3–0 | Baltimore* | 5–0–0 | Minnesota* | 3–2–0 |
| 6 | Dallas | 6–0–0 | St. Louis* | 3–3–0 | Los Angeles | 6–0–0 | Detroit | 3–2–1 |
| 7 | Dallas | 6–1–0 | St. Louis* | 4–3–0 | Baltimore* | 6–1–0 | Detroit* | 3–3–1 |
| 8 | Dallas | 7–1–0 | St. Louis* | 5–3–0 | Baltimore* | 7–1–0 | Chicago* | 4–4–0 |
| 9 | Dallas | 7–2–0 | Cleveland | 6–3–0 | Baltimore* | 8–1–0 | Chicago* | 5–4–0 |
| 10 | Dallas | 8–2–0 | Cleveland | 7–3–0 | Baltimore | 9–1–0 | Minnesota | 6–4–0 |
| 11 | Dallas | 9–2–0 | Cleveland | 8–3–0 | Baltimore | 10–1–0 | Minnesota | 6–5–0 |
| 12 | Dallas | 10–2–0 | Cleveland | 9–3–0 | Baltimore | 11–1–0 | Chicago* | 6–6–0 |
| 13 | Dallas | 11–2–0 | Cleveland | 10–3–0 | Baltimore | 12–1–0 | Chicago* | 7–6–0 |
| 14 | Dallas | 12–2–0 | Cleveland | 10–4–0 | Baltimore | 13–1–0 | Minnesota | 8–6–0 |

- indicates more than one team with record

== Final standings ==
Eastern Conference

NFL Capitol
| | W | L | T | PCT | DIV | CONF | PF | PA | STK |
|---|---|---|---|---|---|---|---|---|---|
| Dallas Cowboys | 12 | 2 | 0 | .857 | 5–1 | 9–1 | 431 | 186 | W5 |
| New York Giants | 7 | 7 | 0 | .500 | 5–1 | 7–3 | 294 | 325 | L4 |
| Washington Redskins | 5 | 9 | 0 | .357 | 2–4 | 3–7 | 249 | 358 | W1 |
| Philadelphia Eagles | 2 | 12 | 0 | .143 | 0–6 | 1–9 | 202 | 351 | L1 |

Note: Tie games were not officially counted in the standings until 1972.

NFL Century
| | W | L | T | PCT | DIV | CONF | PF | PA | STK |
|---|---|---|---|---|---|---|---|---|---|
| Cleveland Browns | 10 | 4 | 0 | .714 | 4–2 | 7–3 | 394 | 273 | L1 |
| St. Louis Cardinals | 9 | 4 | 1 | .692 | 5–0–1 | 8–1–1 | 325 | 289 | W4 |
| New Orleans Saints | 4 | 9 | 1 | .308 | 2–4 | 3–7 | 246 | 327 | W1 |
| Pittsburgh Steelers | 2 | 11 | 1 | .154 | 0–5–1 | 1–8–1 | 244 | 397 | L5 |

Note: Tie games were not officially counted in the standings until 1972.

Western Conference

NFL Coastal
| | W | L | T | PCT | DIV | CONF | PF | PA | STK |
|---|---|---|---|---|---|---|---|---|---|
| Baltimore Colts | 13 | 1 | 0 | .929 | 6–0 | 10–0 | 402 | 144 | W8 |
| Los Angeles Rams | 10 | 3 | 1 | .769 | 3–2–1 | 6–3–1 | 312 | 200 | L2 |
| San Francisco 49ers | 7 | 6 | 1 | .538 | 2–3–1 | 4–5–1 | 303 | 310 | W1 |
| Atlanta Falcons | 2 | 12 | 0 | .143 | 0–6 | 1–9 | 170 | 389 | L4 |

NFL Central
| | W | L | T | PCT | DIV | CONF | PF | PA | STK |
|---|---|---|---|---|---|---|---|---|---|
| Minnesota Vikings | 8 | 6 | 0 | .571 | 4–2 | 6–4 | 282 | 242 | W2 |
| Chicago Bears | 7 | 7 | 0 | .500 | 3–3 | 5–5 | 250 | 333 | L1 |
| Green Bay Packers | 6 | 7 | 1 | .462 | 1–4–1 | 2–7–1 | 281 | 227 | W1 |
| Detroit Lions | 4 | 8 | 2 | .333 | 3–2–1 | 4–5–1 | 207 | 241 | L1 |

== Postseason ==
=== NFL playoffs ===
Conference championship games
December 22 – Memorial Stadium
Minnesota Vikings (8–6) | 14
Baltimore Colts (13–1) | 24
December 21 – Cleveland Stadium
Dallas Cowboys (12–2) | 20
Cleveland Browns (10–4) | 31

NFL Championship Game
December 29 – Cleveland Stadium
Baltimore Colts | 34
Cleveland Browns | 0

=== Playoff Bowl ===
The Playoff Bowl was between the conference runners-up, for third place in the league. The game, in its ninth year, was played one week after the title game.

- Dallas 17, Minnesota 13 at Orange Bowl, Miami, Florida, January 5, 1969

=== Super Bowl ===
In an upset, the New York Jets, league champion of the 1968 American Football League season, defeated the Baltimore Colts, 16–7, at Orange Bowl in Miami, on January 12, 1969.

== Awards ==
| Most Valuable Player | Earl Morrall, quarterback, Baltimore Colts |
| Coach of the Year | Don Shula, Baltimore Colts |
| Offensive Rookie of the Year | Earl McCullouch, wide receiver, Detroit |
| Defensive Rookie of the Year | Claude Humphrey, defensive end, Atlanta |

== Coaching changes ==
=== Offseason ===
- Chicago Bears: George Halas stepped down as head coach and was replaced by Jim Dooley.
- San Francisco 49ers: Jack Christiansen was replaced by Dick Nolan.
- Green Bay Packers: Vince Lombardi stepped down as head coach less than one month after winning Super Bowl II and was replaced by his long time assistant, Phil Bengtson.

=== In-season ===
- Atlanta Falcons: Norb Hecker was fired after three games and replaced by Norm Van Brocklin.

== See also ==
- 1968 American Football League season
