= 1969 Cleveland Browns season =

NFL team season

- General manager: Harold Sauerbrei
- Head coach: Blanton Collier
- Home stadium: Cleveland Stadium

Results
- Record: 10–3–1
- Division place: 1st NFL Century
- Playoffs: Won Eastern Conference Championship Game (at Cowboys) 38–14; Lost NFL Championship (at Vikings) 7–27
- Pro Bowlers: Bill Nelsen, QB; Walter Johnson, DT; Fred Hoaglin, C Jim Houston, LB; Jack Gregory, DB; Leroy Kelly, RB; Paul Warfield, WR; Gene Hickerson, G

The 1969 Cleveland Browns season was the team's 20th season with the National Football League and their 24th overall in professional football and the last before the 1970 AFL-NFL Merger.

The Browns made it to the 1969 NFL Championship Game, where they fell to the Minnesota Vikings 27–7. The 1969 season would be the last year that Cleveland would win a postseason game until 1986. In addition, that victory over Dallas would also be the last time the Browns won a postseason game on the road until the 2020–21 playoffs. The Browns would also have to wait until 1986 for their next victory in Pittsburgh and sweep of the Steelers. This was also the last season in which the Browns made it to the league championship game, as they have failed to reach the Super Bowl after the merger.

== Offseason ==
=== NFL draft ===
The following were selected in the 1969 NFL/AFL draft.

1969 Cleveland Browns draft
Round	Selection	Player	Position	College	Notes
1	20	Ron Johnson	Running back	Michigan	
3	55	Al Jenkins	Guard	Tulsa	
3	72	Chip Glass	Tight end	Florida State	
4	98	Freddie Summers	Defensive back	Wake Forest	
5	124	Fair Hooker	Wide receiver	Arizona State	
6	145	Larry Adams	Defensive tackle	Texas Christian University	
6	150	Joe Righetti	Defensive tackle	Waynesburg	
7	176	Walt Sumner	Defensive back	Florida State	
8	202	Chuck Reynolds	Center	Tulsa	
9	228	Ron Kamzelski	Defensive tackle	Minnesota	
10	254	Greg Shelly	Guard	Virginia	
11	280	Dave Jones	Wide receiver	Kansas State	
12	306	Dick Davis	Running back	Nebraska	
13	332	Tommy Boutwell	Wide receiver	Southern Miss	
14	358	Jiggy Smaha	Defensive tackle	Georgia	
15	384	Joel Stevenson	Tight end	Georgia Tech	
16	410	James Lowe	Flanker	Tuskegee	
17	436	Bob Oliver	Defensive end	Abilene Christian	

=== Undrafted free agents ===
1969 undrafted free agents of note
Player	Position	College
Jim Guice	Quarterback	Eastern Kentucky
Paul Scopetski	Linebacker	Holy Cross

== Personnel ==
=== Staff/Coaches ===
1969 Cleveland Browns staff
Front office: Majority Owner/CEO & President - Art Modell; Minority owner/vice president - Al Lerner; General manager – Harold Sauerbrei; Coaching Staff: Head coach – Blanton Collier; Offensive coaches: Offensive coordinator – Nick Skorich; Offensive line – Fritz Heisler; Receivers - Bob Nussbaumer	Defensive coaches: Defensive coordinator - Howard Brinker; Defensive line – Dick Modzelewski; Linebackers – Ed Ulinski; Special teams: Placekickers coach - Lou Groza; Strength & Conditioning: Athletic trainer - Leo Murphy; Equipment manager - Morris Kono

=== Roster ===
1969 Cleveland Browns roster
Quarterbacks (QB): 16 Bill Nelsen; 17 Jerry Rhome; Running backs (RB): 30 Ron Johnson; 44 Leroy Kelly; 25 Charlie Leigh; 26 Reece Morrison; 35 Bo Scott; Wide receivers (WR): 86 Gary Collins; 43 Fair Hooker; 41 Dave Jones; 42 Paul Warfield; Tight ends (TE): 83 Chip Glass; 89 Milt Morin	Offensive linemen (OL): 73 Monte Clark T; 64 Jim Copeland G; 65 John Demarie G; 66 Gene Hickerson G; 54 Fred Hoaglin C; 55 Chuck Reynolds C/G; 77 Dick Schafrath T; 62 Joe Taffoni T; Defensive linemen (DL): 81 Jack Gregory DE; 71 Walter Johnson DT; 69 Jim Kanicki DT; 70 Joe Righetti DT; 88 Ron Snidow DE; 84 Marvin Upshaw DT/DE	Linebackers (LB): 52 Billy Andrews OLB; 50 John Garlington OLB; 82 Jim Houston OLB; 51 Dale Lindsey MLB/OLB; 56 Bob Matheson MLB; 59 Wayne Meylan MLB/OLB; Defensive backs (DB): 40 Erich Barnes CB; 21 Dean Brown FS; 34 Mike Howell FS; 24 Ernie Kellermann SS; 49 Alvin Mitchell CB; 29 Walt Sumner CB; Special teams (ST): 12 Don Cockroft K/P	Practice squad: 53 Tom Beutler LB; 11 Don Gault QB; 60 Al Jenkins G/T; 79 Bob Oliver DE; 20 Freddie Summers S; Reserve: 28 Ben Davis CB (IR); 33 Tom Schoen S (Military); Rookies in italics

== Preseason ==
On August 30, a crowd of 85,532 fans viewed a doubleheader at Cleveland's Municipal Stadium. In the first contest, the Chicago Bears (with All-Pro running back Gale Sayers) played the AFL's Buffalo Bills (with rookie running back O. J. Simpson), while the Cleveland Browns hosted the Green Bay Packers in the second match.

== Exhibition schedule ==
Week	Date	Opponent	Result	Attendance
1	August 10	vs. San Francisco 49ers at Seattle	W 24–19	32,219
2	August 16	at Los Angeles Rams	W 10–3	54,937
3	August 23	at San Diego Chargers	T 19–19	36,005
4	August 30	Green Bay Packers	L 17–27	85,532
5	September 6	at Washington Redskins	W 20–10	45,994
6	September 13	vs. Minnesota Vikings at Akron	L 16–23	28,561

== Regular season schedule ==
Week	Date	Opponent	Result	Record	Attendance
1	September 21	at Philadelphia Eagles	W 27–20	1–0	60,658
2	September 28	Washington Redskins	W 27–23	2–0	82,581
3	October 5	Detroit Lions	L 21–28	2–1	82,933
4	October 12	at New Orleans Saints	W 27–17	3–1	71,274
5	October 18	Pittsburgh Steelers	W 42–31	4–1	84,078
6	October 26	St. Louis Cardinals	T 21–21	4–1–1	81,186
7	November 2	Dallas Cowboys	W 42–10	5–1–1	84,850
8	November 9	at Minnesota Vikings	L 3–51	5–2–1	47,700
9	November 16	at Pittsburgh Steelers	W 24–3	6–2–1	47,670
10	November 23	New York Giants	W 28–17	7–2–1	80,595
11	November 30	at Chicago Bears	W 28–24	8–2–1	45,050
12	December 7	Green Bay Packers	W 20–7	9–2–1	82,137
13	December 14	at St. Louis Cardinals	W 27–21	10–2–1	44,924
14	December 21	at New York Giants	L 14–27	10–3–1	62,966

== Standings ==
NFL Century
	W	L	T	PCT	DIV	CONF	PF	PA	STK
Cleveland Browns	10	3	1	.769	4–1–1	8–1–1	351	300	L1
New York Giants	6	8	0	.429	4–2	4–6	264	298	W3
St. Louis Cardinals	4	9	1	.308	3–2–1	3–6–1	314	389	L3
Pittsburgh Steelers	1	13	0	.071	0–6	0–10	218	404	L13

Note: Tie games were not officially counted in the standings until 1972.

== Playoffs ==
Round	Date	Opponent	Result	Record	Venue	Attendance	Recap
Eastern Conference	December 27	at Dallas Cowboys	W 38–14	1–0	Cotton Bowl	69,321	Recap
NFL Championship	January 4, 1970	at Minnesota Vikings	L 7–27	1–1	Metropolitan Stadium	47,900	Recap
