= 1970 Cleveland Browns season =

NFL team season

- Owner: Art Modell
- General manager: Harold Sauerbrei
- Head coach: Blanton Collier
- Home stadium: Cleveland Stadium

Results
- Record: 7–7
- Division place: 2nd AFC Central
- Playoffs: Did not qualify
- Pro Bowlers: Jim Houston, LLB/MLB; Leroy Kelly, RB; Gene Hickerson, G

The 1970 Cleveland Browns season was the team's 21st season with the National Football League and their 25th year in pro football overall. The Browns attempted to improve on its 10-3-1 record from 1969. The team would fail to do so, and they finished with an even 7-7 record and missed the postseason. This was the first season that the Browns would play the Cincinnati Bengals, their new arch-rival in the AFC Central. The two teams split their two meetings in the first season series.

== Season summary ==
The merger between the NFL and AFL was complete, with the leagues now playing each other in the regular season for the first time. This was the last step in a four-year process that began in January 1967 with the champions from both leagues playing in Super Bowl I.

To finish the merger, the Browns, along with the Pittsburgh Steelers and Baltimore Colts, agreed to move in 1970 from the NFL to the old AFL, renamed the AFC, to balance the leagues, now called conferences (NFC and AFC), at 13 clubs each. The merger had hit a stalemate when none of the NFL teams initially wanted to jump to what many of the old-line NFL people felt was an inferior league overall.

Concerning just the Browns themselves, there was the situation involving Blanton Collier. Although no one except maybe the man himself knew it at the start of the season, this was going to be the last year for the venerable head coach. Plagued by hearing problems, the 64-year-old coach announced his retirement before the end of the 1970 season, which the Browns finished with a 7–7 record. Collier told owner Art Modell that he could no longer hear his players, and it was difficult to read their lips through new face masks that obscured their mouths. Modell tried to help by getting Collier to try new hearing aids and even sent him for acupuncture treatment, but none of it worked. Collier struggled during press conferences because he often could not hear what reporters were asking and answered the wrong questions. In eight years as coach, Collier led Cleveland to a championship and a 76–34–2 record. Nick Skorich, who came to the Browns as offensive coordinator in 1964, was named as his replacement in 1971. Collier had been in the job since 1963 and guided the Browns to the NFL championship a year later.

== Paul Warfield trade to Dolphins ==
Realizing quarterback Bill Nelsen's aching knees were on borrowed time, the Browns had made a blockbuster trade with the Miami Dolphins on the eve of the 1970 NFL Draft to get the rights to select the man they felt would be their passer of the future, Mike Phipps. But it came at a steep price, for they had to give up Pro Football Hall of Fame wide receiver Paul Warfield in the process. That loss, coupled with Nelsen's physical condition and the unfamiliarity with the personnel on the former AFL clubs they were playing for the first time, took the starch out of what had been a good offense going back to 1963. The result was the Browns scored 65 less points than they had the year before, and 108 less than two seasons before.

Along with that, the defense, though it gave up 35 fewer points than it had in 1969, just could not make up the difference, led to the Browns finishing 7–7, only the second non-winning mark in club history. In spite of that, the season started well for the Browns, as they opened 3–1 and then were 4–2.

== First Monday Night Football game ==
The Browns beat Joe Namath and the New York Jets 31–21 at Cleveland Municipal Stadium in the opener in the first Monday Night Football game in history, and, three games later, edged Cincinnati 30–27 in Bengals head coach Paul Brown's first official visit to Cleveland since being fired by the Browns eight years before.

== Offseason ==
=== NFL draft ===
The following were selected in the 1970 NFL draft.

1970 Cleveland Browns draft
Round	Selection	Player	Position	College	Notes
1	3	Mike Phipps	Quarterback	Purdue	
1	21	Bob McKay	Tackle	Texas	
2	36	Turkey Jones	Defensive end	Tennessee State	
2	47	Jerry Sherk	Defensive tackle	Oklahoma State	
4	99	Ricky Stevenson	Defensive back	Arizona	
5	125	Steve Engel	Running back	Colorado	
6	151	Mike Cilek	Quarterback	Iowa	
7	177	Craig Wycinsky	Guard	Michigan State	
8	203	Honester Davidson	Defensive back	Bowling Green	
9	229	Geoff Brown	Linebacker	Pittsburgh	
10	255	William Yanchar	Defensive tackle	Purdue	
11	281	Gene Benner	Wide receiver	Maine	
12	307	Jerry Sanders	Kicker	Texas Tech	
13	333	Larry Roberts	Running back	Central Missouri	
14	359	Jim Tharpe	Linebacker	Lincoln (Mo.)	
15	385	Guy Homoly	Defensive back	Illinois State	
16	410	John Redebaugh	Tight end	Bemidji State	
17	436	Charles Tabb	Running back	McMurry	

=== Undrafted free agents ===
1970 undrafted free agents of note
Player	Position	College
Bill Wazevich	Wide receiver	Columbia

== Personnel ==
=== Staff / Coaches ===
1970 Cleveland Browns staff
Front office: Owner - Art Modell; General manager - Harold Sauerbrei; Equipment manager - Morrie Kono; Assistant equipment manager - Bob Glenn; Head coaches: Head coach – Blanton Collier; Offensive coaches: Offensive Coordinator - Nick Skorich; Offensive Line - Fritz Heisler; Offensive Backs - Howard Keys; Wide Receivers - Bob Nussbaumer	Defensive coaches: Defensive Coordinator - Howard Brinker; Defensive Line - Dick Modzelewski; Linebackers - Ed Ulinski; Strength and conditioning: Trainer - Leo Murphy

=== Roster ===
1970 Cleveland Browns roster
Quarterbacks (QB): 11 Don Gault; 15 Mike Phipps; 16 Bill Nelsen; Running backs (RB): 26 Reece Morrison; 30 Ken Brown; 35 Bo Scott; 44 Leroy Kelly; Wide receivers (WR): 41 Dave Jones; 43 Fair Hooker; 85 Homer Jones; 86 Gary Collins; Tight ends (TE): 83 Chip Glass; 89 Milt Morin	Offensive linemen (OL): 54 Fred Hoaglin C; 55 Chuck Reynolds C/G; 62 Joe Taffoni T; 64 Jim Copeland G; 65 John Demarie G; 66 Gene Hickerson G; 78 Bob McKay T; 77 Dick Schafrath T; Defensive linemen (DL): 71 Walter Johnson DT; 72 Jerry Sherk DT; 75 Bill Yanchar DT; 80 Joe Jones DE; 81 Jack Gregory DE; 88 Ron Snidow DE	Linebackers (LB): 50 John Garlington OLB; 51 Dale Lindsey MLB; 52 Billy Andrews OLB; 53 Tom Beutler OLB; 56 Bob Matheson MLB; 82 Jim Houston OLB; Defensive backs (DB): 20 Freddie Summers SS; 24 Ernie Kellermann SS; 28 Ben Davis CB; 29 Walt Sumner CB; 34 Mike Howell FS; 40 Erich Barnes CB; Special teams (ST): 12 Don Cockroft K/P	Practice squad: 57 Geoff Brown LB; 36 Steve Engel RB; 33 Tom Schoen S; 67 Craig Wycinsky G; Reserve: 60 Al Jenkins G/T (IR); 27 Randy Minniear RB (IR); 70 Joe Righetti DT (IR); 23 Rickey Stevenson CB (IR); Rookies in italics 40 active, 4 reserve, 0 practice squad

== Exhibition schedule ==
Week	Date	Opponent	Result	Record	Venue	Attendance
1	August 8	at Los Angeles Rams	L 17–30	0–1	Los Angeles Memorial Coliseum	71,559
2	August 15	vs. San Francisco 49ers	W 17–10	1–1	Tampa Stadium	41,851
3	August 22	vs. Kansas City Chiefs	L 13–16	1–2	Memphis Memorial Stadium	31,532
4	August 29	at Cincinnati Bengals	L 24–31	1–3	Riverfront Stadium	57,112
5	September 5	Minnesota Vikings	L 21–24	1–4	Cleveland Municipal Stadium	83,043
6	September 12	at New York Giants	W 30–29	2–4	Yankee Stadium	62,461

There was a doubleheader on September 5, 1970 Cardinals vs Chargers and Vikings vs Browns.

== Regular season schedule ==
Week	Date	Opponent	Result	Record	Venue	Attendance	Recap
1	September 21	New York Jets	**W** 31–21	1–0	Cleveland Municipal Stadium	85,703	Recap
2	September 27	at San Francisco 49ers	**L** 31–34	1–1	Kezar Stadium	37,502	Recap
3	October 3	**Pittsburgh Steelers**	**W** 15–7	2–1	Cleveland Municipal Stadium	84,349	Recap
4	October 11	**Cincinnati Bengals**	**W** 30–27	3–1	Cleveland Municipal Stadium	83,520	Recap
5	October 18	Detroit Lions	**L** 24–41	3–2	Cleveland Municipal Stadium	83,577	Recap
6	October 25	at Miami Dolphins	**W** 28–0	4–2	Miami Orange Bowl	75,313	Recap
7	November 1	San Diego Chargers	**L** 10–27	4–3	Cleveland Municipal Stadium	80,047	Recap
8	November 8	at Oakland Raiders	**L** 20–23	4–4	Oakland–Alameda County Coliseum	54,463	Recap
9	November 15	at **Cincinnati Bengals**	**L** 10–14	4–5	Riverfront Stadium	60,007	Recap
10	November 22	**Houston Oilers**	**W** 28–14	5–5	Cleveland Municipal Stadium	74,723	Recap
11	November 29	at **Pittsburgh Steelers**	**L** 9–28	5–6	Three Rivers Stadium	50,214	Recap
12	December 7	at **Houston Oilers**	**W** 21–10	6–6	Houston Astrodome	50,582	Recap
13	December 12	Dallas Cowboys	**L** 2–6	6–7	Cleveland Municipal Stadium	75,458	Recap
14	December 20	at Denver Broncos	**W** 27–13	7–7	Mile High Stadium	51,001	Recap
Note: Intra-division opponents are in **bold** text.

=== Season summary ===
==== Week 4 ====
In the first regular-season matchup between Paul Brown's old team and his new one, the Browns beat the Bengals. Running backs Leroy Kelly and Bo Scott combined for 236 yards, and defensive tackle Walter Johnson sacked Bengals quarterback Virgil Carter for a safety.

Team	1	2	3	4	Total
Bengals	10	7	3	7	27
• **Browns**	2	14	0	14	30

- Date: October 11
- Location: Cleveland Municipal Stadium • Cleveland, Ohio
- Game start: 1:00 p.m.
- Game weather: 51 °F (11 °C) • Wind 8 mph (13 km/h)
- Referee: Tommy Bell

Scoring summary
1	CIN	Horst Muhlmann 50 yard field goal	Bengals 3–0
1	CIN	Jess Phillips 2 yard run (Horst Muhlmann kick)	Bengals 10–0
1	CLE	Safety, Virgil Carter tackled by Walter Johnson in end zone	Bengals 10–2
2	CLE	Leroy Kelly 3 yard pass from Bill Nelsen (Don Cockroft kick)	Bengals 10–9
2	CIN	Royce Berry 58 yard fumble return (Horst Muhlmann kick)	Bengals 17–9
2	CLE	Milt Morin 4 yard pass from Bill Nelsen (Don Cockroft kick)	Bengals 17–16
3	CIN	Horst Muhlmann 27 yard field goal	Bengals 20–16
4	CLE	Leroy Kelly 1 yard run (Don Cockroft kick)	Browns 23–20
4	CLE	Bo Scott 1 yard run (Don Cockroft kick)	Browns 30–20
4	CIN	Speedy Thomas 16 yard pass from Virgil Carter (Horst Muhlmann kick)	Browns 30–27

=== Standings ===
AFC Central
	W	L	T	PCT	DIV	CONF	PF	PA	STK
Cincinnati Bengals	8	6	0	.571	3–3	7–4	312	255	W7
Cleveland Browns	7	7	0	.500	4–2	7–4	286	265	W1
Pittsburgh Steelers	5	9	0	.357	3–3	5–6	210	272	L3
Houston Oilers	3	10	1	.231	2–4	3–7–1	217	352	L3

Note: Tie games were not officially counted in the standings until 1972.

== Bibliography ==
- Pluto, Terry (1997). Browns Town 1964: Cleveland Browns and the 1964 Championship. Cleveland: Gray & Company. ISBN 978-1-886228-72-6.
