= List of Cleveland Browns starting quarterbacks =

The Cleveland Browns are a professional American football team in Cleveland, Ohio. The Browns compete in the National Football League (NFL) as a member of the American Football Conference (AFC) North division.

Since joining the NFL in 1950, the Browns have had 69 quarterbacks start at least one game. Pro Football Hall of Famer Otto Graham led the Browns to three NFL championships in their first six seasons in the league.

After resuming play in 1999 following a three-year suspension of operations, the franchise has been notable for its instability at the quarterback position. From 1999 through the start of the 2026 season, the team has had 42 players start at quarterback, with only three seasons (2001 with Tim Couch, 2019 and 2020 with Baker Mayfield) in which the same quarterback started every game.

The early era of the NFL and American football in general was not conducive to passing the football, with the forward pass not being legalized until the early 1900s and not fully adopted for many more years. Although the quarterback position has historically been the one to receive the snap and thus handle the football on every offensive play, the importance of the position during this era was limited by various rules, like having to be five yards behind the line of scrimmage before a forward pass could be attempted. These rules and the tactical focus on rushing the ball limited the importance of the quarterback position while enhancing the value of different types of backs, such as the halfback and the fullback. Some of these backs were considered triple-threat men, capable of rushing, passing or kicking the football, making it common for multiple players to attempt a pass during a game.

As rules changed and the NFL began adopting a more pass-centric approach to offensive football, the importance of the quarterback position grew. Beginning in 1950, total wins and losses by a team's starting quarterback were tracked. Prior to 1950, the Browns had numerous players identified as playing the quarterback position. However, the combination of unreliable statistics in the early era of the NFL and the differences in the early quarterback position make tracking starts by quarterbacks impractical for this timeframe.

== Starters per season ==
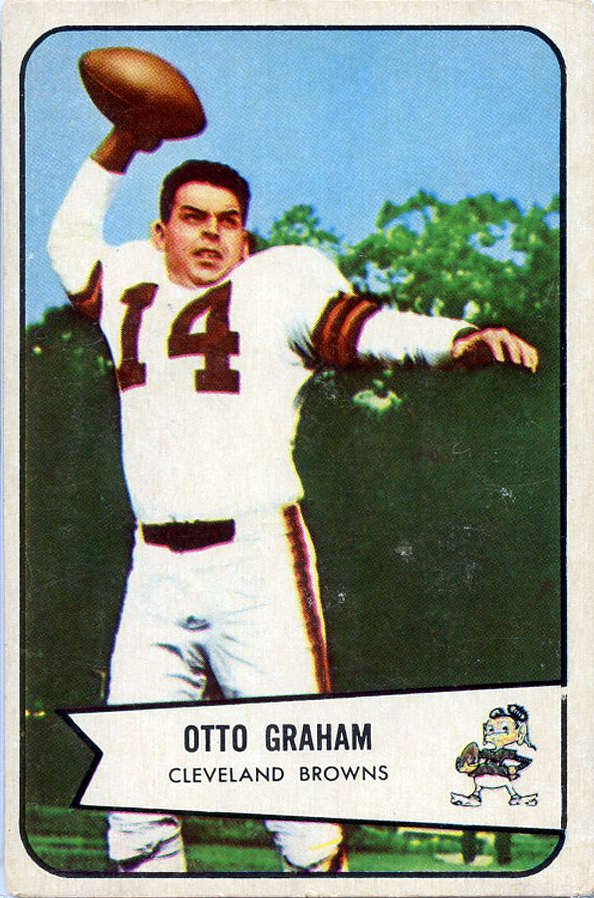
Otto Graham (1946–1955)

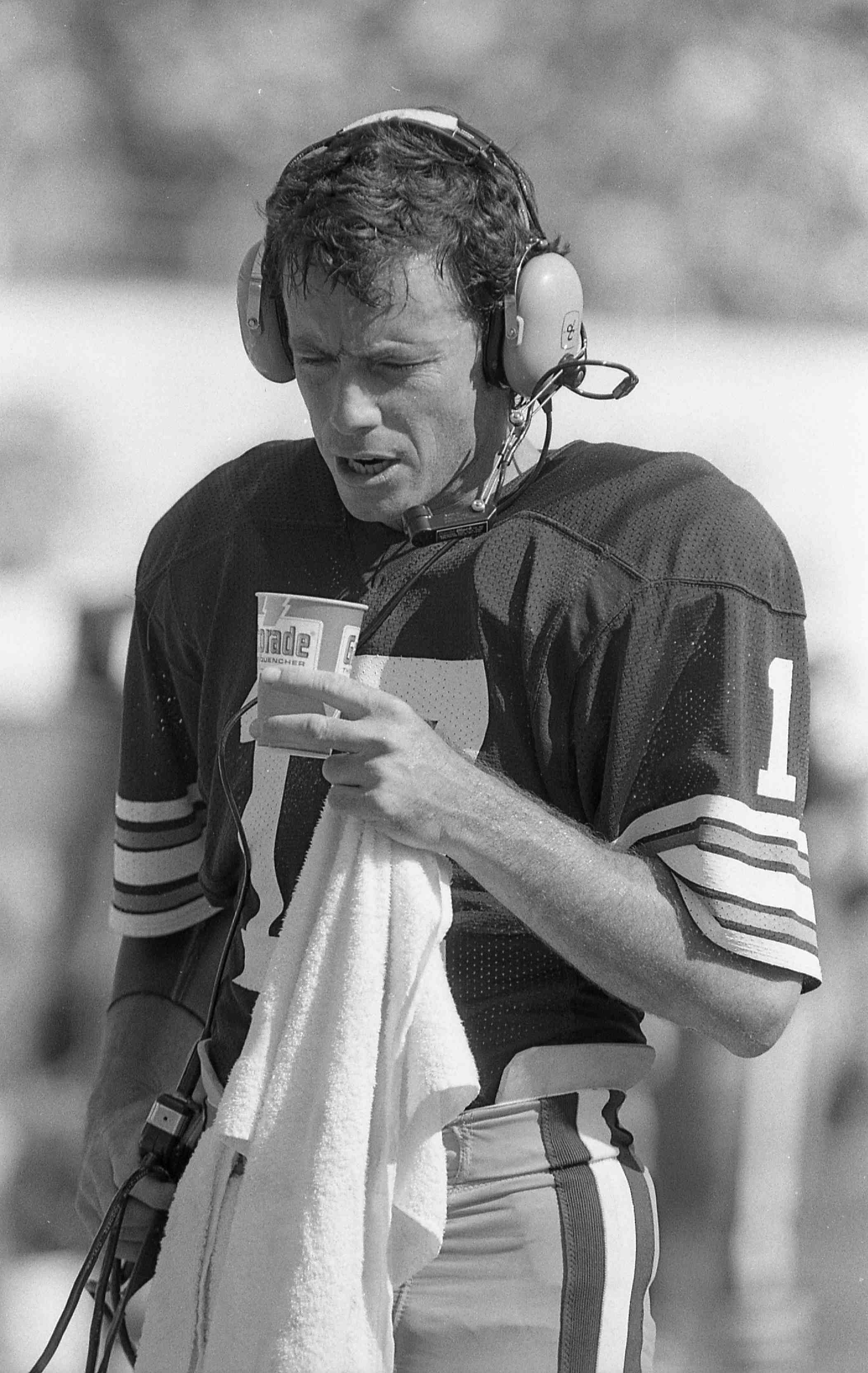
Brian Sipe (1974–1983)

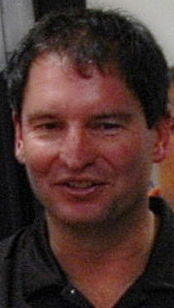
Bernie Kosar (1985–1993)

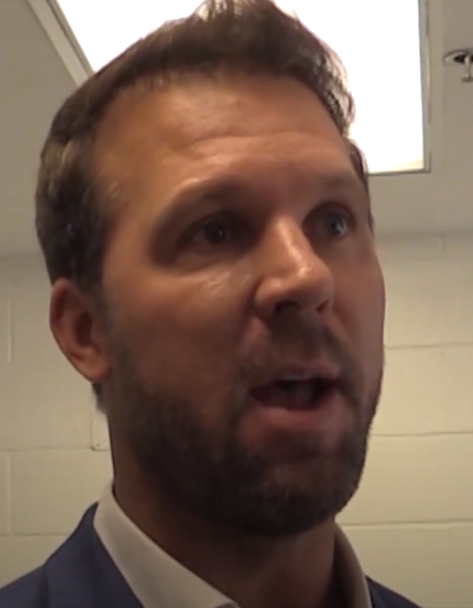
Tim Couch (1999–2003)

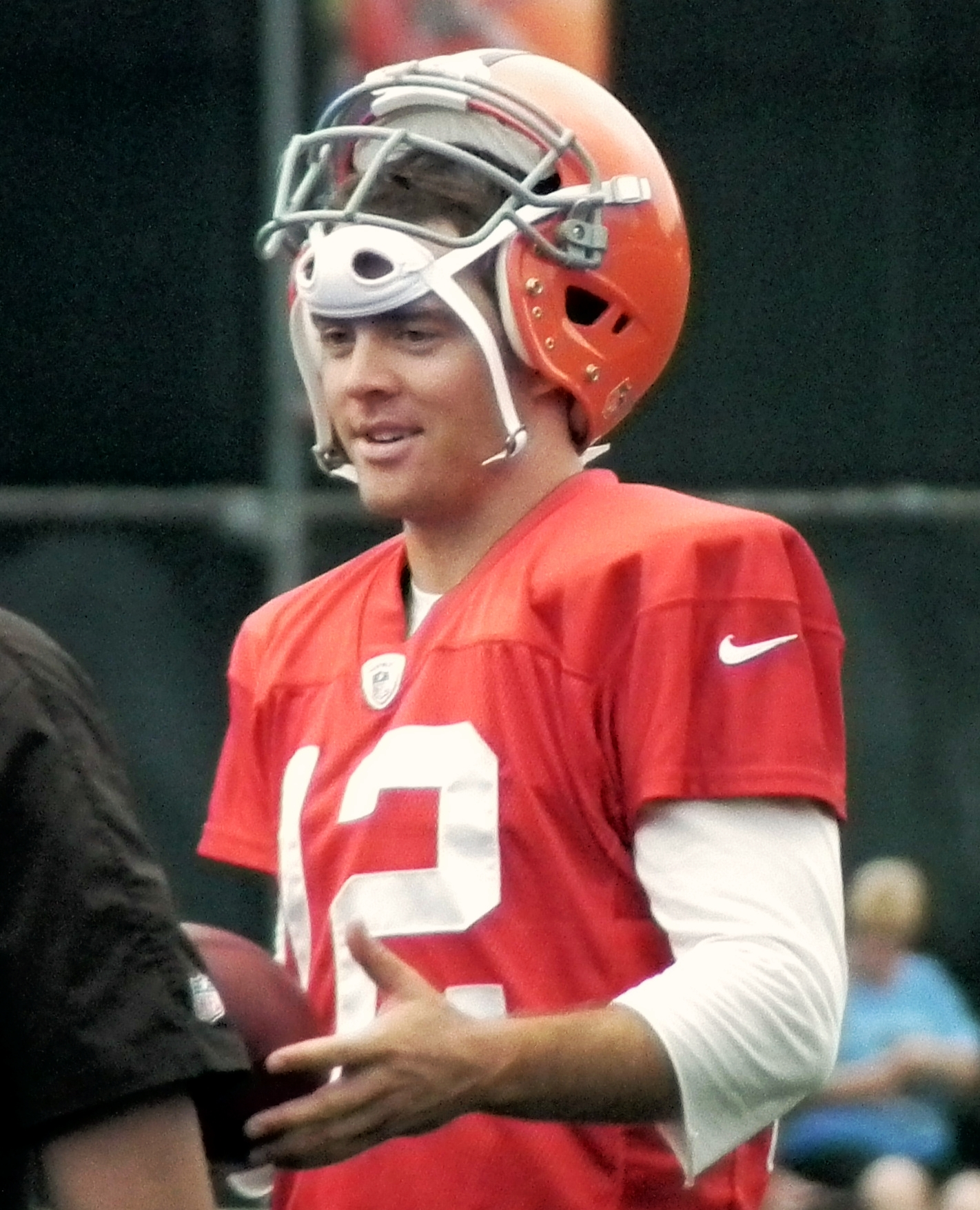
Colt McCoy (2010–2011)

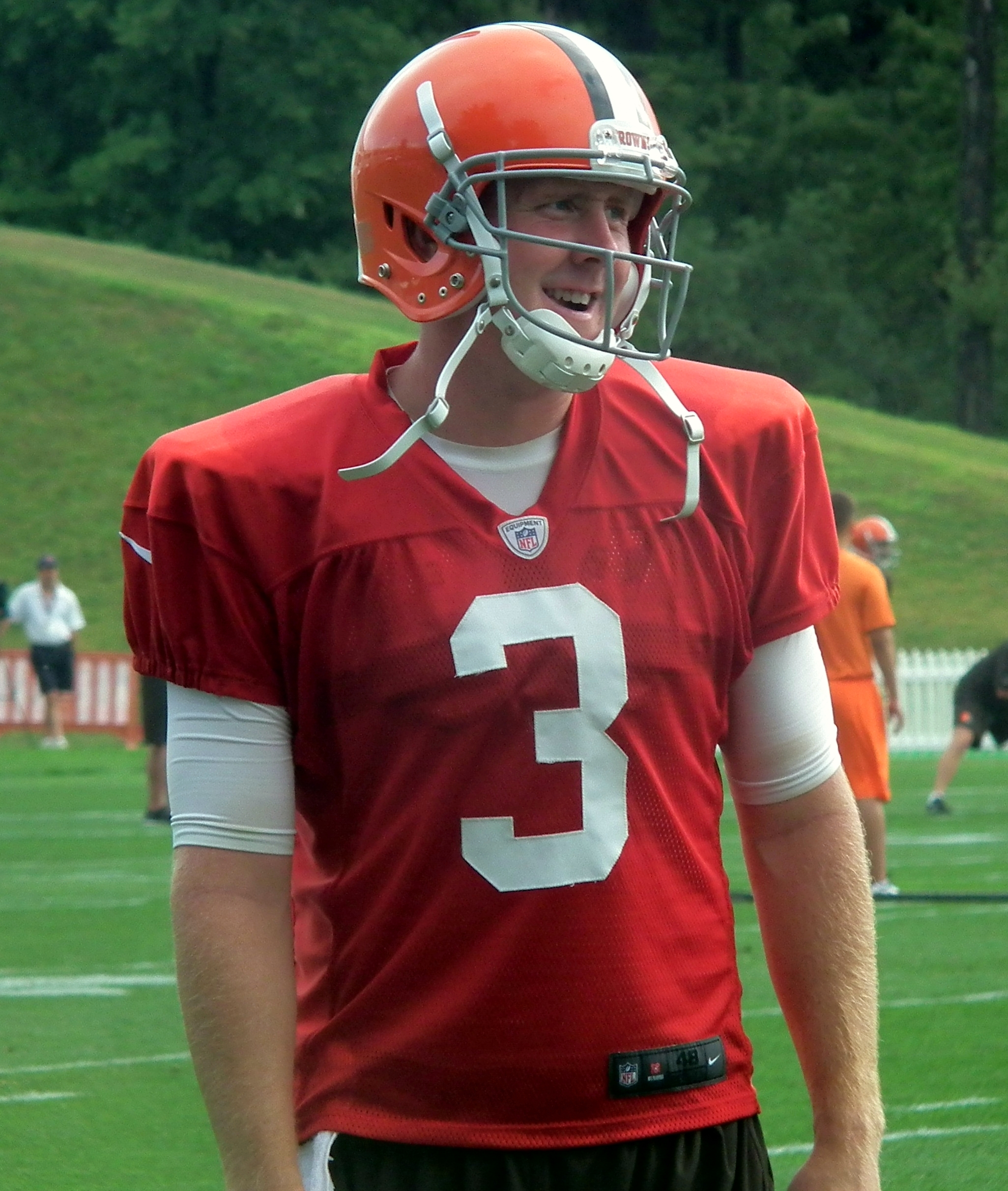
Brandon Weeden (2012–2013)

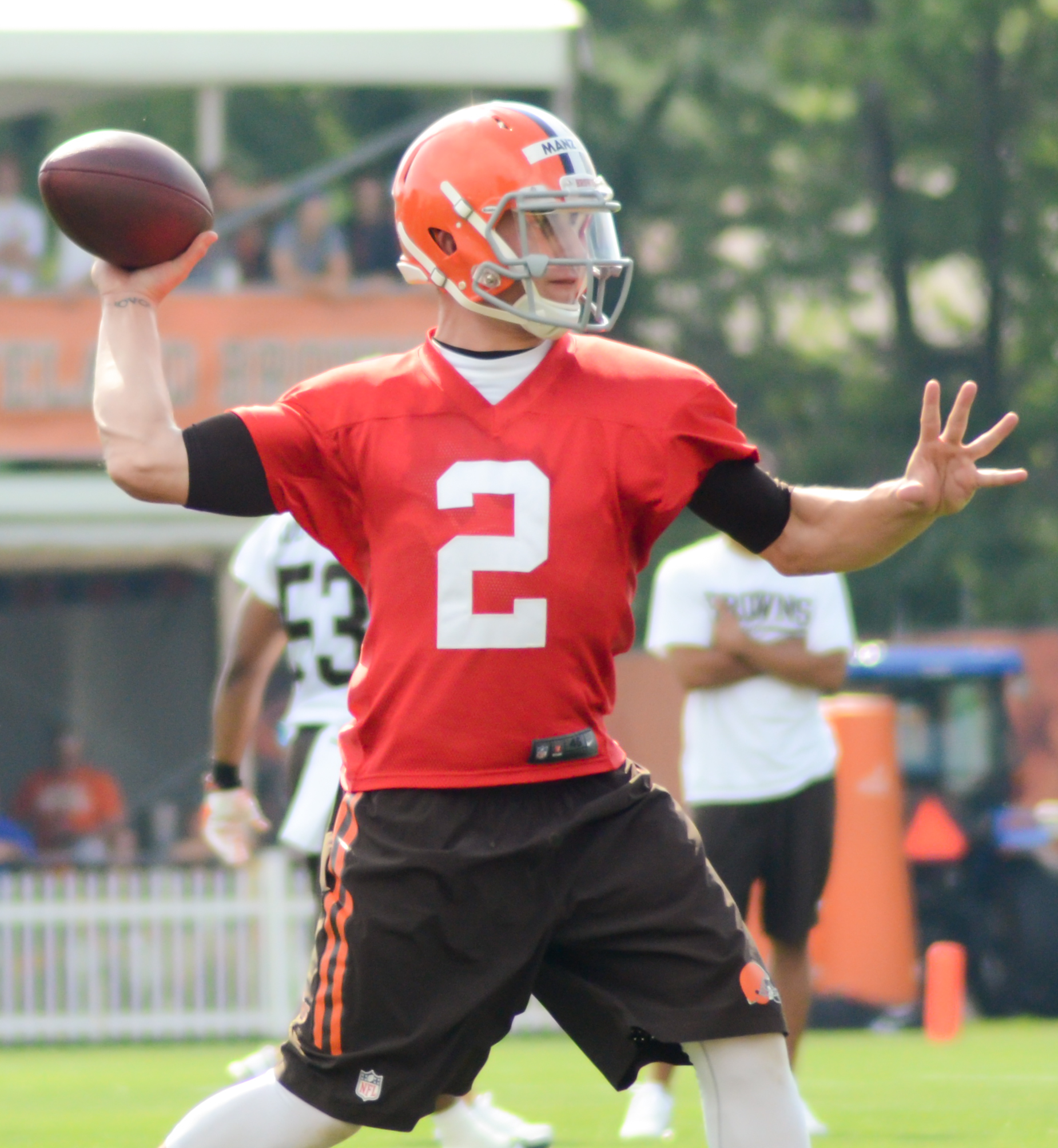
Johnny Manziel (2014–2015)

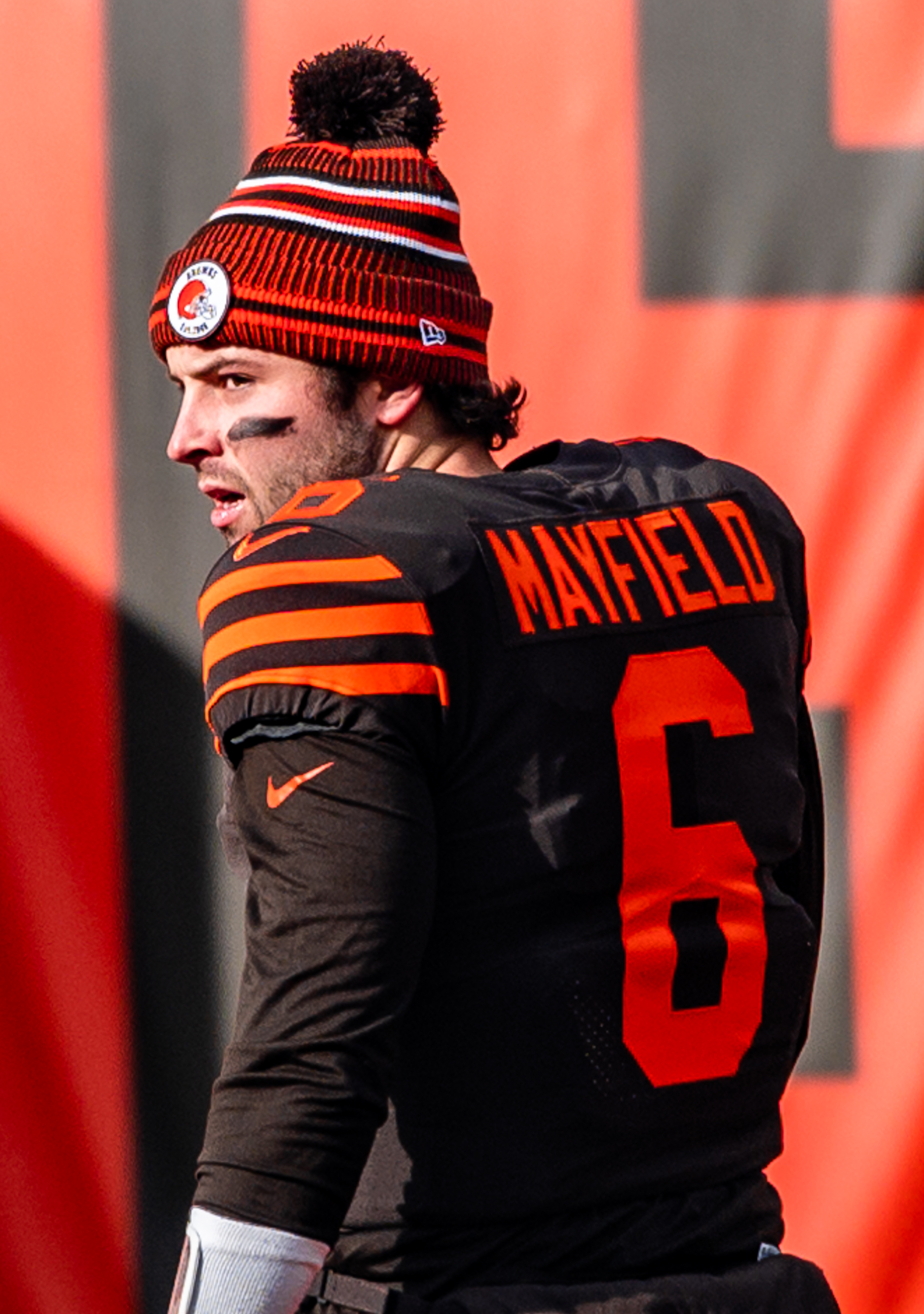
Baker Mayfield (2018–2021)

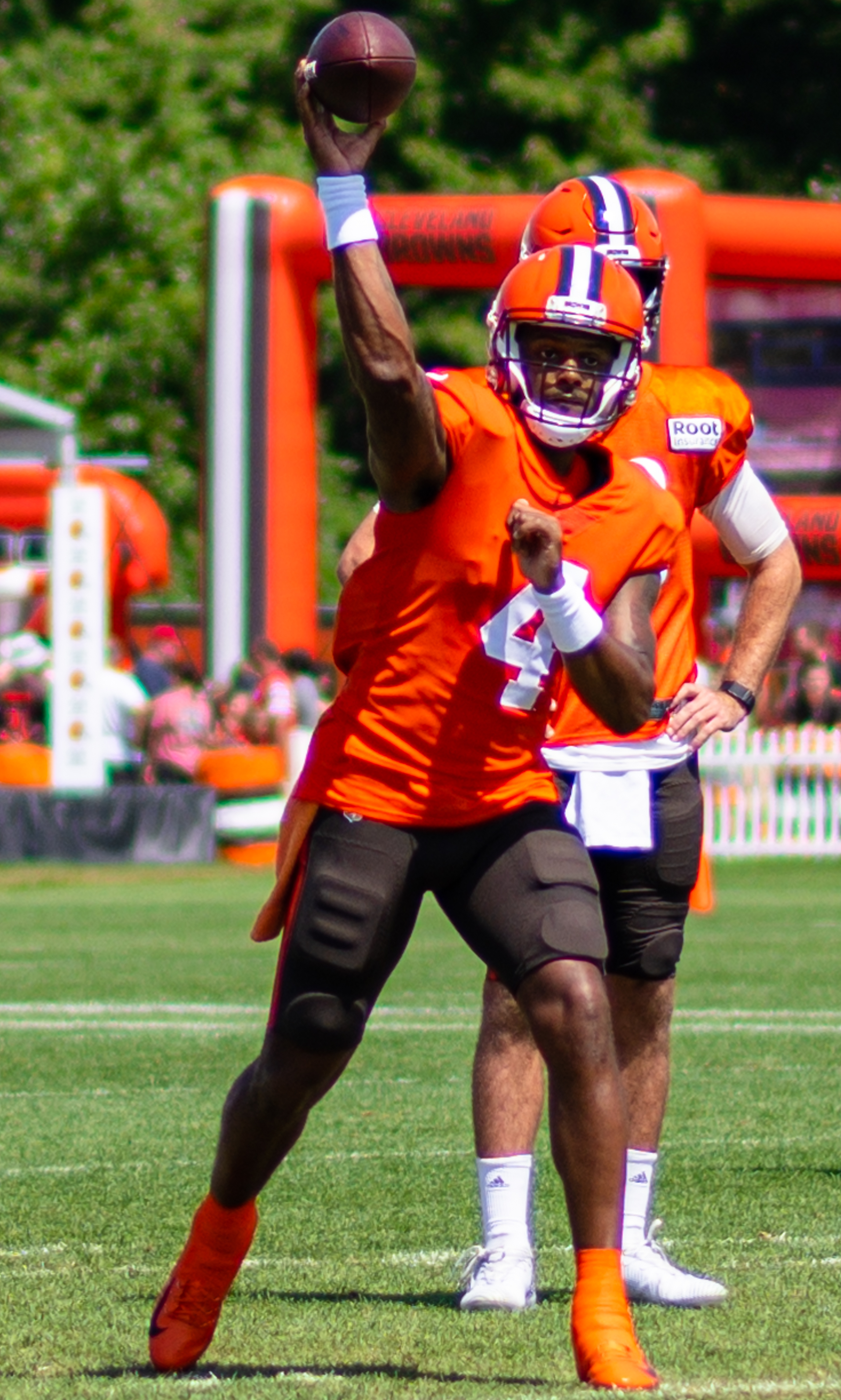
Deshaun Watson (2022–present)

The number of regular season games each player started during the season is listed to the right.

Season(s)	Quarterback(s)
1950	Otto Graham (12)
1951	Otto Graham (12)
1952	Otto Graham (12)
1953	Otto Graham (11) / George Ratterman (1)
1954	Otto Graham (12)
1955	Otto Graham (12)
1956	Tommy O'Connell (5) / George Ratterman (4) / Babe Parilli (3)
1957	Tommy O'Connell (9) / Milt Plum (3)
1958	Milt Plum (12)
1959	Milt Plum (12)
1960	Milt Plum (12)
1961	Milt Plum (13) / Len Dawson (1)
1962	Jim Ninowski (7) / Frank Ryan (7)
1963	Frank Ryan (13) / Jim Ninowski (1)
1964	Frank Ryan (14)
1965	Frank Ryan (12) / Jim Ninowski (2)
1966	Frank Ryan (14)
1967	Frank Ryan (13) / Gary Lane (1)
1968	Bill Nelsen (11) / Frank Ryan (3)
1969	Bill Nelsen (14)
1970	Bill Nelsen (12) / Mike Phipps (1) / Don Gault (1)
1971	Bill Nelsen (13) / Mike Phipps (1)
1972	Mike Phipps (13) / Bill Nelsen (1)
1973	Mike Phipps (14)
1974	Mike Phipps (9) / Brian Sipe (5)
1975	Mike Phipps (11) / Brian Sipe (2) / Will Cureton (1)
1976	Brian Sipe (14) / Mike Phipps (2)
1977	Brian Sipe (9) / Dave Mays (4) / Terry Luck (1)
1978	Brian Sipe (16)
1979	Brian Sipe (16)
1980	Brian Sipe (16)
1981	Brian Sipe (16)
1982	Brian Sipe (6) / Paul McDonald (3)
1983	Brian Sipe (14) / Paul McDonald (2)
1984	Paul McDonald (16)
1985	Bernie Kosar (10) / Gary Danielson (6)
1986	Bernie Kosar (16)
1987	Bernie Kosar (12) / Jeff Christensen (2) / Gary Danielson (1)
1988	Bernie Kosar (9) / Mike Pagel (4) / Don Strock (2) / Gary Danielson (1)
1989	Bernie Kosar (16)
1990	Bernie Kosar (13) / Mike Pagel (3)
1991	Bernie Kosar (16)
1992	Mike Tomczak (8) / Bernie Kosar (7) / Todd Philcox (1)
1993	Bernie Kosar (7) / Vinny Testaverde (6) / Todd Philcox (3)
1994	Vinny Testaverde (13) / Mark Rypien (3)
1995	Vinny Testaverde (12) / Eric Zeier (4)
1996–1998	Suspended operations
1999	Tim Couch (14) / Ty Detmer (2)
2000	Doug Pederson (8) / Tim Couch (7) / Spergon Wynn (1)
2001	Tim Couch (16)
2002	Tim Couch (14) / Kelly Holcomb (2)
2003	Kelly Holcomb (8) / Tim Couch (8)
2004	Jeff Garcia (10) / Luke McCown (4) / Kelly Holcomb (2)
2005	Trent Dilfer (11) / Charlie Frye (5)
2006	Charlie Frye (13) / Derek Anderson (3)
2007	Derek Anderson (15) / Charlie Frye (1)
2008	Derek Anderson (9) / Brady Quinn (3) / Ken Dorsey (3) / Bruce Gradkowski (1)
2009	Brady Quinn (9) / Derek Anderson (7)
2010	Colt McCoy (8) / Jake Delhomme (4) / Seneca Wallace (4)
2011	Colt McCoy (13) / Seneca Wallace (3)
2012	Brandon Weeden (15) / Thad Lewis (1)
2013	Jason Campbell (8) / Brandon Weeden (5) / Brian Hoyer (3)
2014	Brian Hoyer (13) / Johnny Manziel (2) / Connor Shaw (1)
2015	Josh McCown (8) / Johnny Manziel (6) / Austin Davis (2)
2016	Cody Kessler (8) / Robert Griffin III (5) / Josh McCown (3)
2017	DeShone Kizer (15) / Kevin Hogan (1)
2018	Baker Mayfield (13) / Tyrod Taylor (3)
2019	Baker Mayfield (16)
2020	Baker Mayfield (16)
2021	Baker Mayfield (14) / Case Keenum (2) / Nick Mullens (1)
2022	Jacoby Brissett (11) / Deshaun Watson (6)
2023	Deshaun Watson (6) / Joe Flacco (5) / Dorian Thompson-Robinson (3) / P. J. Walker (2) / Jeff Driskel (1)
2024	Jameis Winston (7) / Deshaun Watson (7) / Dorian Thompson-Robinson (2) / Bailey Zappe (1)
2025	Shedeur Sanders (7) / Dillon Gabriel (6) / Joe Flacco (4)
2026	Deshaun Watson (9) / Shedeur Sanders (1)

== Most games started ==
Quarterbacks who have started for the Cleveland Browns from the team's first NFL season of 1950 to present. A player is credited with a win if he started the game and the team won that game, no matter if the player was injured or permanently removed after the first play from scrimmage. Only regular season games are included. The Browns' All-America Football Conference games from 1946 to 1949 are not included. The Browns did not field a team from 1996 to 1998.

Sorted by number of starts. Members of the Pro Football Hall of Fame in italics and most recent starter in bold.

Quarterback	Games started	Wins	Losses	Ties	Winning pct.
Brian Sipe	112	57	55	0	.509
Bernie Kosar	105	53	51	1	.510
Frank Ryan	76	52	22	2	.697
Otto Graham	71	57	13	1	.810
Tim Couch	59	22	37	0	.373
Baker Mayfield	59	29	30	0	.492
Bill Nelsen	51	34	16	1	.676
Mike Phipps	51	24	25	2	.490
Milt Plum	51	33	16	2	.667
Derek Anderson	34	16	18	0	.471
Vinny Testaverde	31	16	15	0	.516
**Deshaun Watson**	28	15	13	0	.536
Paul McDonald	21	8	13	0	.381
Colt McCoy	21	6	15	0	.286
Brandon Weeden	20	5	15	0	.250
Charlie Frye	19	6	13	0	.316
Brian Hoyer	16	10	6	0	.625
DeShone Kizer	15	0	15	0	.000
Tommy O'Connell	14	10	3	1	.750
Kelly Holcomb	12	4	8	0	.333
Brady Quinn	12	3	9	0	.250
Jim Ninowski	11	5	6	0	.455
Trent Dilfer	11	4	7	0	.364
Jacoby Brissett	11	4	7	0	.364
Josh McCown	11	1	10	0	.091
Jeff Garcia	10	3	7	0	.300
Joe Flacco	9	5	4	0	.556
Gary Danielson	8	5	3	0	.625
Mike Tomczak	8	4	4	0	.500
Doug Pederson	8	1	7	0	.125
Jason Campbell	8	1	7	0	.125
Johnny Manziel	8	2	6	0	.250
Cody Kessler	8	0	8	0	.000
Shedeur Sanders	8	3	5	0	.375
Mike Pagel	7	2	5	0	.286
Seneca Wallace	7	1	6	0	.143
Jameis Winston	7	2	5	0	.286
Dillon Gabriel	6	1	5	0	.167
George Ratterman	5	2	3	0	.400
Todd Philcox	5	2	3	0	.400
Robert Griffin III	5	1	4	0	.200
Dorian Thompson-Robinson	5	1	4	0	.200
Jake Delhomme	4	2	2	0	.500
Dave Mays	4	1	3	0	.250
Eric Zeier	4	1	3	0	.250
Luke McCown	4	0	4	0	.000
Babe Parilli	3	1	2	0	.333
Mark Rypien	3	2	1	0	.667
Ken Dorsey	3	0	3	0	.000
Tyrod Taylor	3	1	1	1	.500
Don Strock	2	2	0	0	1.000
Jeff Christensen	2	1	1	0	.500
Ty Detmer	2	0	2	0	.000
Austin Davis	2	0	2	0	.000
Case Keenum	2	2	0	0	1.000
P. J. Walker	2	1	1	0	.500
Don Gault	1	1	0	0	1.000
Gary Lane	1	0	1	0	.000
Len Dawson	1	1	0	0	1.000
Spergon Wynn	1	0	1	0	.000
Terry Luck	1	0	1	0	.000
Will Cureton	1	0	1	0	.000
Bruce Gradkowski	1	0	1	0	.000
Thaddeus Lewis	1	0	1	0	.000
Connor Shaw	1	0	1	0	.000
Kevin Hogan	1	0	1	0	.000
Nick Mullens	1	0	1	0	.000
Jeff Driskel	1	0	1	0	.000
Bailey Zappe	1	0	1	0	.000

== Team career passing records ==
As of Week 18 of the 2024 NFL season. Completion percentage and passer rating records are for players with at least 1500 pass attempts for the Browns.

- Most yards: Brian Sipe – 23,713
- Most touchdowns: Otto Graham – 174
- Most interceptions: Brian Sipe – 149
- Highest completion percentage: Baker Mayfield – 61.6%
- Highest passer rating: Baker Mayfield – 87.8

== Postseason ==
These Browns quarterbacks started during the postseason.

Season(s)	Quarterback(s)
1950	Otto Graham (2–0)
1951	Otto Graham (0–1)
1952	Otto Graham (0–1)
1953	Otto Graham (0–1)
1954	Otto Graham (1–0)
1955	Otto Graham (1–0)
1957	Tommy O'Connell (0–1)
1958	Milt Plum (0–1)
1964	Frank Ryan (1–0)
1965	Frank Ryan (0–1)
1967	Frank Ryan (0–1)
1968	Bill Nelsen (1–1)
1969	Bill Nelsen (1–1)
1971	Bill Nelsen (0–1)
1972	Mike Phipps (0–1)
1980	Brian Sipe (0–1)
1982	Paul McDonald (0–1)
1985	Bernie Kosar (0–1)
1986	Bernie Kosar (1–1)
1987	Bernie Kosar (1–1)
1988	Don Strock (0–1)
1989	Bernie Kosar (1–1)
1994	Vinny Testaverde (1–1)
2002	Kelly Holcomb (0–1)
2020	Baker Mayfield (1–1)
2023	Joe Flacco (0–1)

=== Pro Bowl selections ===
These Browns starting quarterbacks have been selected to the Pro Bowl.

Quarterback	Season(s) selected
Otto Graham	1950, 1951, 1952, 1953, 1954
Tommy O'Connell	1957
Milt Plum	1960, 1961
Frank Ryan	1964, 1965, 1966
Bill Nelsen	1969
Brian Sipe	1980
Bernie Kosar	1987
Derek Anderson	2007
Shedeur Sanders	2025

== See also ==
- List of NFL starting quarterbacks
