= Al Jenkins (American football) =

American football player (born 1946)

No. 60
- Positions: Guard, Tackle, Defensive end

Personal information
- Born: July 15, 1946 (age 80); New Orleans, Louisiana, U.S.
- Listed height: 6 ft 2 in (1.88 m)
- Listed weight: 245 lb (111 kg)

Career information
- High school: St. Augustine (New Orleans)
- College: Southern Illinois; Tulsa
- NFL draft: 1969: 3rd round, 55th overall pick

Career history
- Cleveland Browns (1969–1970); Miami Dolphins (1972); Houston Oilers (1973)

Awards and highlights
- Super Bowl champion (VII)

Career NFL statistics
- Games played: 40
- Games started: 6
- Fumble recoveries: 1
- Stats at Pro Football Reference

Alfred Joseph Jenkins (born July 15, 1946) is an American former professional football player who was an offensive lineman for three seasons in the National Football League (NFL) for the Cleveland Browns, Miami Dolphins, and Houston Oilers. He played college football for the Southern Illinois Salukis and Tulsa Golden Hurricane.

The Browns selected Jenkins in the third round of the 1969 NFL/AFL draft hoping he could bring youth to an aging offensive line which included Paul Brown holdovers Dick Schafrath, Monte Clark and Gene Hickerson. However, injuries limited Jenkins to five games in 1970, allowing Joe Taffoni to win the starting right tackle spot that season following Clark's retirement, while at left tackle, 1971 draftee Doug Dieken eventually replaced Schafrath and held the starting spot through 1984. Hickerson remained in the lineup at guard through 1973, by which time Jenkins was long gone from Cleveland.

Jenkins was a backup lineman on Miami's undefeated 1972 Super Bowl championship team. He was one of the players who carried coach Don Shula off the field on their shoulders after the team's victory in Super Bowl VII and as a result his image is included in the bronze statue outside Sun Life Stadium commemorating the event.

During the highlight film of Super Bowl VII produced by NFL Films, Jenkins is shown exclaiming "damn!" after the Washington Redskins scored their lone touchdown on Mike Bass' 49-yard return of Garo Yepremian's infamous pass. When the film shows Redskin quarterback Billy Kilmer throwing a pass into the Washington bench on his team's final possession, Jenkins exclaims "Hey Kilmer! Atta boy Kilmer!".
