= Paris High School (Kentucky) =

Location
- 308 W. 7th Street; Paris, Bourbon, Kentucky 40361; United States; 38.2126°N 84.2553°W

Information
- Former name: Paris City School
- School type: Public (U.S.)
- Motto: Semper Cum Superbia ("Always with Pride")
- Established: 1865
- School district: Paris Independent Schools (not to be confused with Texas)
- NCES District ID: 2104710
- Superintendent: Stephen McCauley
- Area trustee: Jason Todd Adams
- NCES School ID: 210471001158
- Vice Chairperson: Janice Sheperd
- Chairperson: Collier Mathes
- Administrator: Brooks, Terrence
- Main Principal: Jami Dailey
- Employees: Lou Johnson
- Grades: 9-12
- Enrollment: 231 (2023–2024)
- Color
- Mascot: Greyhound
- Rival: Bourbon County Colonels
- Website: paris.k12.ky.us paris.kyschools.us

Paris High School is one of the two public high schools in Paris, Kentucky, United States. Paris High School serves roughly 200 students in grades 9–12.

== About ==
Paris High School offers the following of AP classes, Art History, Biology, Calculus, and English Literature. Since 2012, the school hosts the Paris Academy of Health Sciences (AOHS). Paris High School has partnerships for extended learning with Maysville Community College, Racer Academy through Murray State University, and the University of Kentucky. PHS' mission statement: "Paris High School is a learning community dedicated to developing well-rounded, productive, engaged citizens in a safe and supportive environment."

== History ==
=== Pre-history and the Bourbon Academy ===
The Bourbon Academy, was formed in 1798 as an act of Kentucky Legislature and was the earliest school in the county. The Bourbon Academy was donated 6000 acres of land for its endowment; and opened for classes starting in May 1800, with teacher Isaac Tull and a tuition requirement. Its educational successes started the tradition and value of educating children in Paris and Bourbon County.

=== Paris City School ===
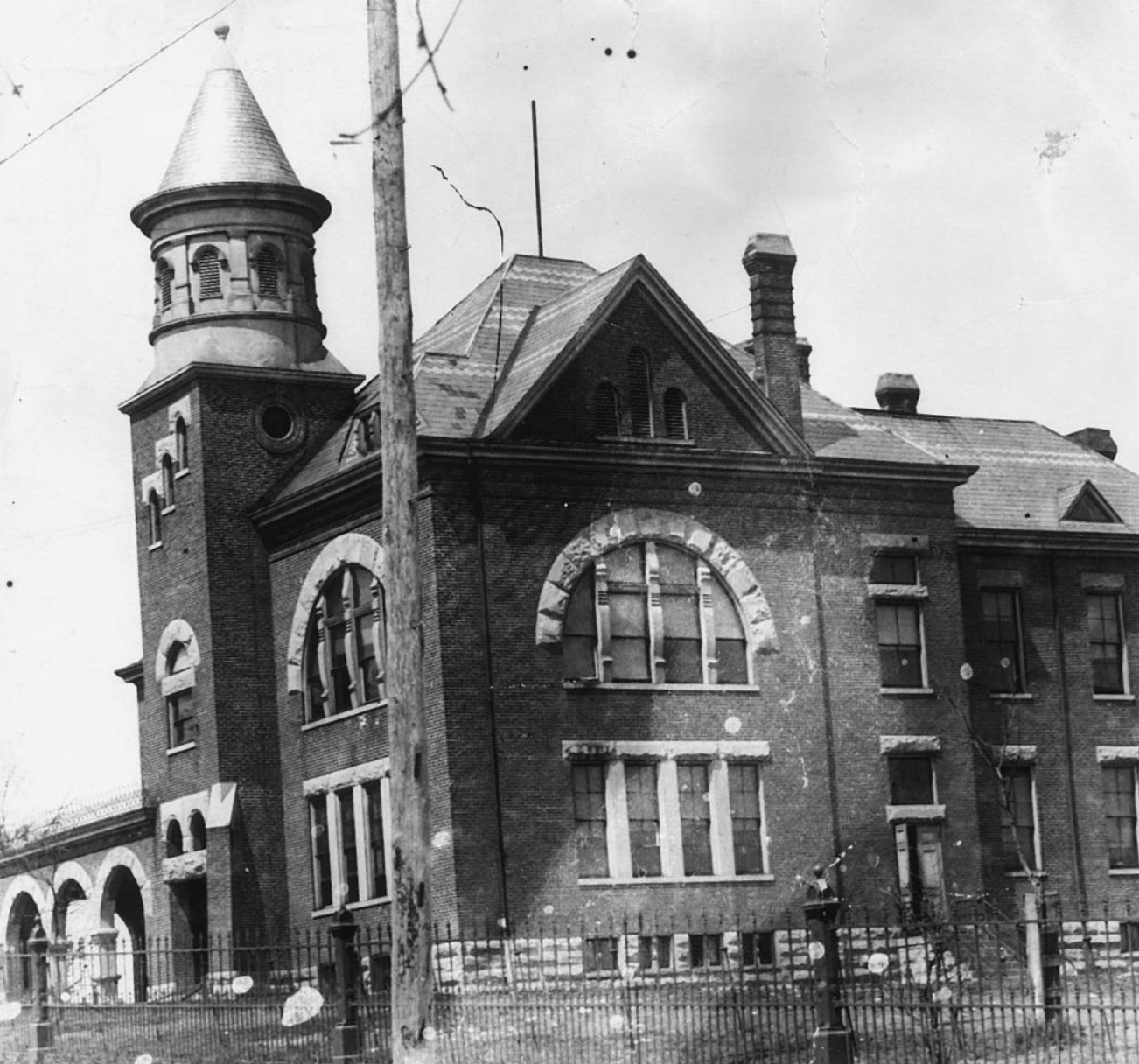
Paris City School's former building on 7th Street (1890–1907)

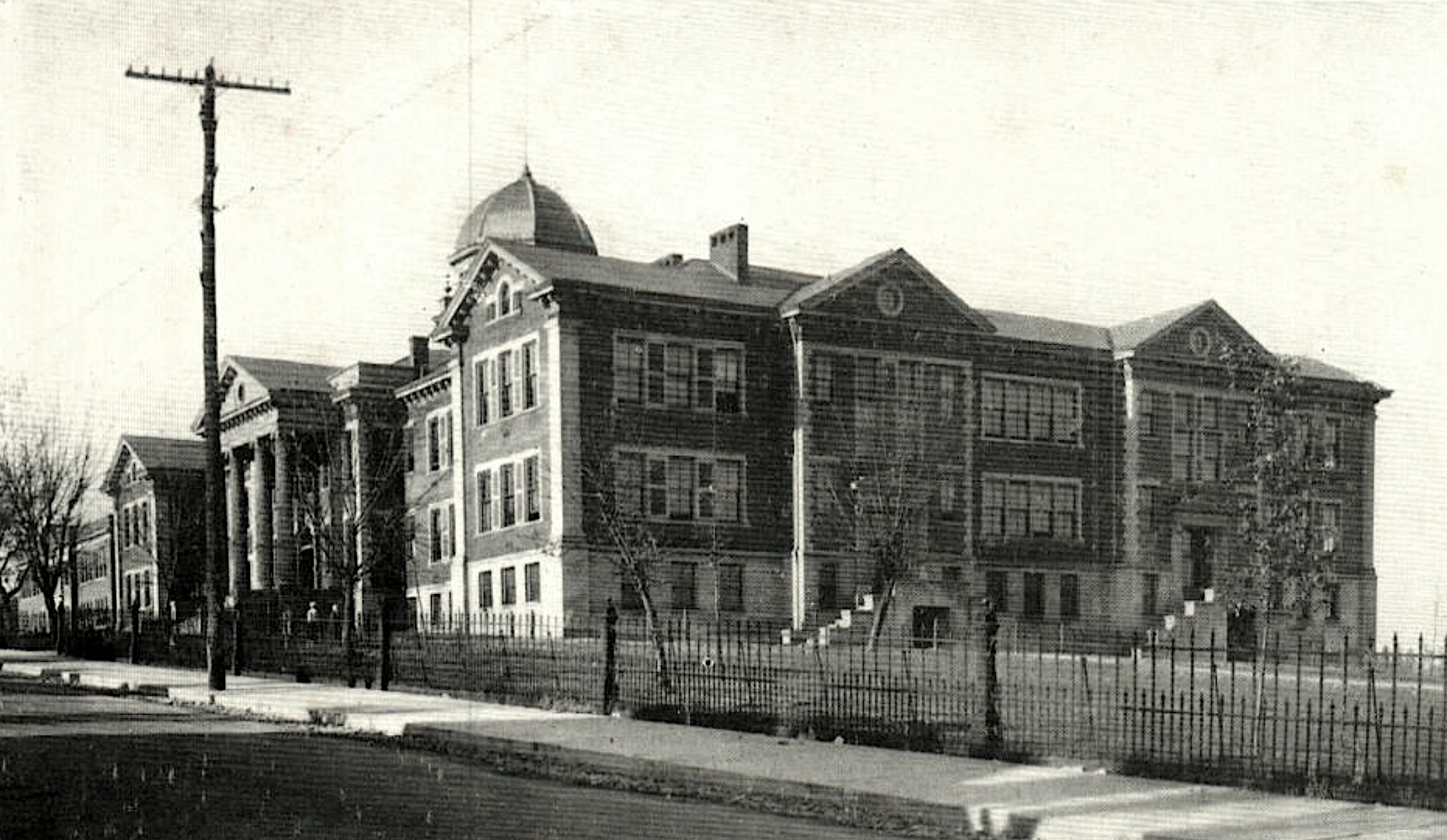
Paris City School and Paris Junior High School (in c. 1923), the main building (1908–demolished 1966)

Paris City School was founded in 1865 as a segregated public high school for white students, under the leadership of principal Julius Herrick. The during the first year the class consisted of the principal, 3 teachers and 130 students, and was held in the former Bourbon Academy building on Pleasant Street. Classes were free for Paris residents, but Bourbon County residents had to pay a tuition.

Other early principals at the Paris City School included George Varden from 1867 to 1868; W. H. Lockhart from 1868 to 1871; W. E. Clarke from 1871 to 1873; Ben D. Best from 1873 to 1874; Pukett from 1874 to 1880; and H. R. Blaisdell from 1880 to 1882.

The building on Pleasant Street burned on January 18, 1889, and a new Richardsonian Romanesque style building was finished by 1890 and located on 7th Street. On January 28, 1907, a faulty furnace burned down the school, classes were temporarily held in the courthouse basement until the new school building could be finished the following year.

The new school building was much larger and could accommodate up to 750 students, it featured with four porch columns. In 1923, the second floor of the building was dedicated as the Paris Junior High School. In 1928, a gymnasium was added to the complex. The building was demolished in 1966. But the old gymnasium was later converted into a library in 1992, when they built a new gymnasium.

After the U.S. Supreme Court case Brown v. Board of Education (1954), the city integration committee was led by chair, Grover Baldwin Jr. In 1963, four Black students from Paris Western High School were sent to attend Paris High School in efforts towards racial integration. The following year in 1964, all of the African American students from Paris Western High School were moved into Paris High School.

== Athletics ==
The Paris High School won three State football championships in 1973, 1981, and 1982. Notable former school athletes included Basil Hayden (1916), Blanton Collier (1928), Bill Arnsparger (1943), Beth Wilkerson (1979), and Alvin Sims (1993).

In 2024, Paris High installed an orange football field.

In 2025, Paris High School announced Dane Damron as its new head football coach.
