= Alvin Sims =

American basketball player

Personal information
- Born: October 18, 1974 (age 52) Paris, Kentucky, U.S.
- Listed height: 6 ft 4 in (1.93 m)
- Listed weight: 235 lb (107 kg)

Career information
- High school: Paris (Paris, Kentucky)
- College: Louisville (1993–1997)
- NBA draft: 1997: undrafted
- Playing career: 1997–2009
- Position: Shooting guard / small forward
- Number: 19

Career history
- 1997–1998: Quad City Thunder
- 1998: Long Island Surf
- 1998–1999: Panionios
- 1999: Phoenix Suns
- 1999–2000: Quad City Thunder
- 2000–2001: Makedonikos
- 2001–2002: Roseto
- 2002–2003: SIG Strasbourg
- 2003: Leicester Riders
- 2003–2004: Trieste
- 2004: Reggiana
- 2005: ÉB Pau-Orthez
- 2005–2007: Sagesse Beirut
- 2007–2008: Panthers Fürstenfeld
- 2008–2009: Anibal Zahle

Career highlights
- Greek League All-Star (1998); CBA champion (1998); CBA Rookie of the Year (1998); CBA All-Rookie Team (1998); Second-team All-Conference USA (1997); Conference USA Defensive Player of the Year (1997)
- Stats at NBA.com
- Stats at Basketball Reference

Alvin Sims (born October 18, 1974) is an American former professional basketball player. Sims played with the Phoenix Suns in the National Basketball Association (NBA), during the 1998–99 season.

== College career ==
Sims, a 6-foot-4-inch (1.93 m) tall shooting guard, attended Paris High School, in Paris, Kentucky, where he played high school basketball. After high school, Sims played college basketball at the University of Louisville. He played with the school's men's team, the Louisville Cardinals, from 1993 to 1997. In his junior season, he averaged 11.9 points per game.

== Professional career ==
Sims began his pro club career in the Continental Basketball Association (CBA), with the Quad City Thunder when he won the 1998 CBA championship. With the Thunder, he was voted the 1998 CBA Rookie of the Year. Sims earned a spot with the Phoenix Suns of the NBA, but he was released in May 1999. In four games played with the Suns, he scored a total of 11 points.

Sims also played professionally in Venezuela, Greece, Italy, France, the UK, Lebanon, Austria, Iran, and Cyprus.
