= Ben Davis (American football) =

American football player (born 1945)

No. 28, 29
- Positions: Cornerback, Return specialist

Personal information
- Born: October 30, 1945 (age 81); Birmingham, Alabama, U.S.
- Listed height: 5 ft 11 in (1.80 m)
- Listed weight: 180 lb (82 kg)

Career information
- High school: Fair Lawn (Fair Lawn, New Jersey)
- College: Defiance College
- NFL draft: 1967: 17th round, 439th overall pick

Career history
- Cleveland Browns (1967–1973); Detroit Lions (1974–1976)

Awards and highlights
- Second-team All-Pro (1968)

Career NFL statistics
- Interceptions: 19
- Fumble recoveries: 7
- Kick/punt return yards: 1,100
- Total touchdowns: 2
- Stats at Pro Football Reference

Benjamin Frank Davis (born October 30, 1945) is an American former professional football player who was a cornerback and return specialist for 10 years in the National Football League (NFL). He is the brother of political activist Angela Davis.

== Early life ==
Davis was born in 1945 in Birmingham, Alabama. His father, a graduate of St. Augustine's College, a traditional black college in Raleigh, North Carolina, was briefly a high school history teacher, but found it more lucrative to own and operate a service station in the black section of Birmingham. His mother, with an MA from New York University, was an elementary school teacher. The family owned a large home in a middle class mixed neighborhood called "Dynamite Hill" after so-called "night rider" terrorists began bomb attacks on civil rights leaders clustered there.

To avoid the racial strife for which Dynamite Hill was named, children in the Davis family spent time with friends and relatives elsewhere. Davis graduated from Fair Lawn High School in Fair Lawn, New Jersey, at the age of 15, then marked time by attending Bridgton Academy, a prep school in Maine until he was old enough to enroll in Defiance College in rural Defiance, Ohio.

"I went to Defiance because I was looking for the same type of environment as the prep school," Davis told Fred Greetham in 2001. "I was in the band in high school, but I decided to go out for the football team in college. By the time we were seniors, we were undefeated."

== Professional career ==
Davis was drafted 439th overall in the 17th (and last) round by the Cleveland Browns in the 1967 NFL/AFL draft. With Paul Warfield, Gary Collins and Clifton McNeil already established as receivers, Davis was switched to a defensive role. In his rookie year, he led the league in punt returns, averaging 12.7 yards per return, and one 52-yard return for a touchdown. He also led the Browns in returning kickoffs, with 27 returns totalling 708 yards, including one of 63 yards. Only Leroy Kelly (15.6), Greg Pruitt (12.9) and Eric Metcalf (12.9) ever had better years returning punts for the Browns.

In 1968, Davis started at cornerback, and led the team with 8 interceptions. The season's 32 interceptions that year set a Browns record. His individual performance is the 3rd-best in Browns history, and he still holds the record for seven consecutive games with an interception.

A torn anterior cruciate ligament benched Davis during the 1969 season, and half of the 1970 season.

He was traded to the Detroit Lions in 1974 for a 5th-round draft pick.

== Post-NFL ==
Davis went into copier sales after his football career ended, then went into cable television and bought a radio station in Tulsa, Oklahoma. Since 1995, he has owned and operated Britt Business Systems, a Xerox dealer, in the Cleveland suburb of Beachwood, Ohio. Davis has lived in Cleveland since 1967, even commuting to Detroit when he played for the Lions.

== Personal life ==
Davis and his wife Sylvia have two grown children, Cecilie and Ben III, who both live in California. Davis's sister, Angela Davis, is a prominent political activist. A younger brother, Reggie Davis, also attended Defiance College.
