= Dane Damron =

American college football coach & former player

Current position
- Title: Head coach
- Team: Paris HS (KY)
- Record: 0–0

Playing career
- 1990–1994: Georgetown (KY)

Coaching career (HC unless noted)
- 1999–2001: Lake Gibson HS (FL)
- 2002–2005: Boyd County HS (KY)
- 2007–2008: Kentucky Christian
- 2009–2010: Eastern Kentucky (ST)
- 2011–2015: Eastern Kentucky (OC)
- 2016–2023: Virginia–Wise
- 2025–present: Paris HS (KY)

Head coaching record
- Overall: 30–65 (college); 46–35 (high school)

Dane Damron is an American college football coach and former player. He is the head football coach for Paris High School, a position he has held since 2025. He was the head football coach for the University of Virginia's College at Wise from 2016 to 2023. Damron was the head football coach at Kentucky Christian University from 2007 to 2008, compiling a record of 3–13.

== Coaching career ==
Damron was the head coach at Lake Gibson High School in Lakeland, Florida from 1999 to 2001 finishing with a 22–13 record and leading the program to its first playoff victory in 2000 and first district title in 2001. He left Lake Gibson to take the head coaching job at Boyd County High School in Ashland, Kentucky from 2002 to 2005. The Lions advanced to the second round of the playoffs three straight years, going a combined 24–22 in four seasons at Boyd County. In 2007, he was chosen to head the new football program at Kentucky Christian Knights located in Grayson, Kentucky. He held that position for the 2007 and 2008 seasons. His coaching record at Kentucky Christian was 3–13.

== Head coaching record ==
=== College ===
Year	Team	Overall	Conference	Standing	Bowl/playoffs
Kentucky Christian Knights (NAIA independent) (2007–2008)
2007	Kentucky Christian	2–4			
2008	Kentucky Christian	1–9			
Kentucky Christian:		3–13			
Virginia–Wise Cavaliers (Mountain East Conference) (2016–2018)
2016	Virginia–Wise	6–5	5–5	T–4th	
2017	Virginia–Wise	5–6	4–6	T–6th	
2018	Virginia–Wise	4–6	4–6	8th	
Virginia–Wise Cavaliers (South Atlantic Conference) (2019–2023)
2019	Virginia–Wise	2–9	1–7	8th	
2020–21	Virginia–Wise	1–2	1–2	T–3rd (Mountain)	
2021	Virginia–Wise	5–6	4–4	5th	
2022	Virginia–Wise	2–9	1–8	5th (Mountain)	
2023	Virginia–Wise	2–9	1–7	5th (Mountain)	
Virginia–Wise:		27–52	21–45		
Total:		30–65			
