= Jeff Christensen =

American football player (born 1960)

No. 11
- Position: Quarterback

Personal information
- Born: January 8, 1960 (age 66); Gibson City, Illinois, U.S.
- Listed height: 6 ft 3 in (1.91 m)
- Listed weight: 202 lb (92 kg)

Career information
- High school: Gibson City
- College: Eastern Illinois
- NFL draft: 1983: 5th round, 137th overall pick

Career history
- Cincinnati Bengals (1983); Los Angeles Rams (1984)*; Philadelphia Eagles (1984–1985); Cleveland Browns (1987); Denver Broncos (1987)*; New York Jets (1989)*
- * Offseason or practice squad member only

Career NFL statistics
- Passing attempts: 58
- Passing completions: 24
- Completion percentage: 41.4%
- TD–INT: 1–3
- Passing yards: 297
- Passer rating: 42.1
- Stats at Pro Football Reference

Jeffrey Bruce Christensen (born January 8, 1960) is an American former professional football player who was a quarterback in the National Football League (NFL). He played college football for the Eastern Illinois Panthers and was selected in the fifth round of the 1983 NFL draft. He played in the NFL for the Cincinnati Bengals, Philadelphia Eagles and Cleveland Browns.

Jeff is currently an American quarterback coach widely recognized as one of the premier quarterback developers in football. Some regard him as the most influential quarterback coach in all of football. Through his quarterback development work, he has helped train and refine the skills of notable quarterbacks including Patrick Mahomes, Baker Mayfield, Trey Lance, Ty Simpson, Drew Mestemaker, and numerous others. Christensen is known for his emphasis on biomechanics, footwork, and mental processing, and is widely regarded for his lasting influence on modern quarterback development.

His son Jake played college football at Iowa and Eastern Illinois.
