= Dean Brown (American football) =

American football player (born 1945)

Profile
- Position: defensive back

Personal information
- Born: November 16, 1945 (age 80); McDonough, Georgia
- Listed height: 5 ft 10 in (1.78 m)
- Listed weight: 175 lb (79 kg)

Career information
- College: Fort Valley State

Career history
- Cleveland Browns (1969); Miami Dolphins (1970)
- Stats at Pro Football Reference

Dean Brown (born November 16, 1945) is an American former professional football defensive back who played in the National Football League (NFL) for the Cleveland Browns and Miami Dolphins from 1969 to 1970. Brown played in a total of ten career games.
