= Bob Oliver (American football) =

American football player (1947–2013)

No. 79
- Position: Defensive end

Personal information
- Born: June 17, 1947; Olney, Texas, U.S.
- Died: June 28, 2013 (aged 66); Abilene, Texas, U.S.
- Listed height: 6 ft 3 in (1.91 m)
- Listed weight: 240 lb (109 kg)

Career information
- High school: Albany (Albany, Texas)
- College: Abilene Christian (1965–1968)
- NFL draft: 1969: 17th round, 436th overall pick

Career history
- Cleveland Browns (1969)
- Stats at Pro Football Reference

Robert Lee Oliver (June 17, 1947 – June 28, 2013) was an American professional football defensive end who played one season with the Cleveland Browns of the National Football League (NFL). He was selected by the Browns in the 17th round of the 1969 NFL/AFL draft after playing college football at Abilene Christian University.

== Early life and college ==
Robert Lee Oliver was born on June 17, 1947, in Olney, Texas. He attended Albany High School in Albany, Texas. Albany High won the state title with an undefeated record during Oliver's freshman season.

He played college football for the Abilene Christian Wildcats of Abilene Christian University from 1965 to 1968.

== Professional career ==
Oliver was selected by the Cleveland Browns in the 17th round, with the 436th overall pick, of the 1969 NFL draft. He signed with the Browns in 1969 and played in eight games for the team during the 1969 season, recovering one fumble. He was released by the Browns in late August 1970.

== Personal life ==
Oliver worked in the finance and automobile industries after his NFL career and also spent time as a high school teacher. He graduated from Abilene Christian with his second bachelor's degree in 1999. He was a member of the Texas Trophy Hunter's Association, the National Rifle Association, and the USA Water Ski Association.

He died on June 28, 2013, in Abilene, Texas at the age of 66 "after a long battle with cancer".
