= Blanton Collier =

American football coach (1906–1983)

- Collier on the sideline in September 29, 1963.

Personal information
- Born: July 2, 1906; Millersburg, Kentucky, U.S.
- Died: March 22, 1983 (aged 76); Houston, Texas, U.S.

Career information
- High school: Paris (KY)
- College: Georgetown (KY)

Career history
- Paris HS (KY) (1928–1943) Head coach; Great Lakes Navy (1944–1945) Assistant coach; Cleveland Browns (1946–1953) Assistant coach; Kentucky (1954–1961) Head coach; Cleveland Browns (1962) Assistant coach; Cleveland Browns (1963–1970) Head coach

Awards and highlights
- As head coach: NFL champion (1964); SEC Coach of the Year (1954); As assistant coach: NFL champion (1950); 2× AAFC champion (1947, 1948)

Head coaching record
- Regular season: 76–34–2 (.688)
- Postseason: 3–4 (.429)
- Career: 79–38–2 (.672) (NFL); 41–36–3 (.531) (NCAA); 73–50–10 (.586) (high school)
- Military career
- Allegiance: United States
- Branch: U.S. Navy
- Service years: 1943–1945
- Unit: Great Lakes Training Station
- Conflicts: World War II
- Coaching profile at Pro Football Reference

Blanton Long Collier (July 2, 1906 – March 22, 1983) was an American football head coach who coached at the University of Kentucky between 1954 and 1961 and for the Cleveland Browns in the National Football League (NFL) between 1963 and 1970. His 1964 Browns team won the NFL championship and remains the second-most recent Cleveland professional sports team to win a title.

Collier grew up in Paris, Kentucky, and attended Paris High School. After graduating from Georgetown College, he returned to his old high school to teach and coach sports for 16 years. Collier left the position to join the U.S. Navy in 1943 during World War II. At a naval base outside of Chicago, he met Paul Brown, who was coaching a service football team there. After the war, Brown hired Collier as an assistant coach for the Browns, a team under formation in the All-America Football Conference. After seven years as Brown's top aide, a span over which the Cleveland team won five league championships, Collier took a job as head football coach at Kentucky in 1954. His Kentucky Wildcats teams amassed a 41–36–3 win-loss-tie record over eight seasons.

Collier was fired after the 1961 season and Brown rehired him as an assistant. Art Modell, the owner of the Browns, then fired Brown in 1963 and promoted Collier to head coach. Under Collier, the Browns reached the NFL championship game four times and won once, in 1964. In eight seasons as a professional football coach with the Browns, they never had a losing season under Collier, who won 69% of his games, one of the highest winning percentages in NFL history for coaches with at least 100 games coached, which ranks among the top ten ahead of numerous head coaches. Struggling with hearing loss, Collier retired after the 1970 season, although he remained a scout and quarterbacks coach for several more years. He was diagnosed with prostate cancer in 1976, and retired to Texas, where he died in 1983.

Collier was well-liked by players and renowned as a good sportsman and student of the game. The Kentucky chapter of the NFL Players Association in 2007 established the Blanton Collier Award in his honor. The Paris High School football field is named after him.

== Early life and college career ==
Born in Millersburg, Kentucky, to O.H. and Eva (née Long) Collier; the family moved to nearby Paris when Collier was age six. He attended from Paris High School, where he played football and basketball, and worked as a tobacco-picker in the summers during high school. After graduating, he enrolled at Kentucky's Georgetown College, playing on the football team and earning a Bachelor of Arts degree in 1927.

== High school and assistant coaching career ==
Collier went to work at Paris High School in 1928 as a mathematics teacher, and coached several of the school's sports teams. He got the nickname "George" when he was a teacher because he affectionately called most of his male students "George" and most of his female students "Martha". He married Mary Varder from Paris in 1930, and spent 16 years at the high school before enlisting in the U.S. Navy in 1943 during World War II. Collier's Paris football team had an overall record of 73–50–10. Collier was 37 years old when he joined the military; although he likely could have avoided enlisting because he was a teacher and had a family, he felt serving in the war was his duty.

Collier was assigned to the Great Lakes Naval Training Station north of Chicago, where he was a survival swimming instructor. In the Navy, Collier first had trouble with his hearing, a problem that bothered him later in life. He was once called to report to his ship over a loudspeaker, but did not hear it. Doctors thought his hearing may have been damaged by teaching swimming in a tidal pool or from practicing on the shooting range. "It never became an issue until the Navy, when they figured he had less than 40% of a normal person's hearing," his daughter Kay Collier-Slone said in 1997. To compensate for his hearing loss, Collier became an expert lip reader.

At Great Lakes, Collier went regularly to observe the practices of the station's service football team, the Great Lakes Bluejackets. There, he met Paul Brown, who had left a head-coaching job at Ohio State University to serve in the Navy and lead the Bluejackets team. Collier took notes and hoped to pick up some football knowledge he could use when he returned to Paris. Brown, however, noticed Collier's dedication, and brought him onto his staff as a volunteer assistant.

In 1945, Brown was hired by Arthur B. McBride as the first coach of the Cleveland Browns, a team under formation in the new All-America Football Conference (AAFC). Brown hired Collier as a backfield coach for the team, which was set to begin play in 1946. Initially, his specialty was pass defense, but Brown soon rewarded Collier's extensive football knowledge with a broader assistant coaching assignment.

Collier served under Brown from 1946 to 1953, a period in which the team won all four titles in the AAFC before moving to the National Football League (NFL) in 1950. That season, the Browns captured the NFL title and then reached but lost the following three championship games. Collier's coaching style was the opposite of Brown's; Brown was a disciplinarian whose stern nature and aloofness often brought him into conflict with players, while Collier was a friendly, warm man whose patience and studiousness endeared him to players. "Everything had to be perfect; he was a stickler on perfection – but at the same time, he had great patience," Browns quarterback Otto Graham said. After the 1946 season, Brown asked Collier to analyze every play run by the offense, and Collier came up with a detailed breakdown of why each play succeeded or failed. This was the genesis of an annual grading system Collier developed to evaluate players' performances. The Browns used it for many years.

== University of Kentucky ==
When University of Kentucky head football coach Bear Bryant left for Texas A&M University after the 1953 season, Collier accepted an offer to succeed him. He stayed at Kentucky for eight years, a span during which the Wildcats football team had a 41–36–3 record, including a 5–2–1 record against arch rival Tennessee. Notable wins included a 1954 victory at Georgia Tech, then ranked 15th in the AP Poll, and defeats of eighth-ranked Ole Miss in 1955 and 12th-ranked Tennessee in 1957. In 1954, Collier was named the coach of the year in the Southeastern Conference.

Despite a winning record, Collier was fired in January 1962, when he was making $17,500 per year (about $186,000 in 2025 dollars). He was replaced a week later by Charlie Bradshaw, an assistant to Bear Bryant at Alabama. Bryant had led the Wildcats to appearances in three major bowl games, but Collier never led the Wildcats to a bowl during his tenure. His best record was in his first year, when the team finished 7–2.

Kentucky's football program was overshadowed by its successful basketball program during Collier's tenure. Collier was also criticized for his poor recruiting skills, a crucial factor for college coaches. Many fans wrote the university to complain about him and his staff. Still, several future star coaches served as assistants under Collier at Kentucky, including Don Shula, Chuck Knox, Howard Schnellenberger, and Bill Arnsparger. Standout players under Collier included All-Americans Lou Michaels and Schnellenberger.

== Cleveland Browns ==
After losing his job at Kentucky, Collier said he was unsure what he would do next. "Right now I feel I would like to remain in football if the opportunity presents itself," he said. Two weeks later, Brown brought him back onto the Cleveland Browns staff as an offensive assistant. Collier and Brown had remained close friends during his time at Kentucky. Collier attended the Browns' training camps in Ohio during the summers, and Brown's family visited Collier on occasion in Lexington. Collier said he was happy to be back with the Browns, saying it was "like returning home". Brown praised Collier's teaching and called him a "scientific football man" and "one of my closest friends".

By the time Collier rejoined the Browns, the team was in the throes of a transition. Art Modell had bought the club in 1961, and was locked in a bitter power struggle with Brown. The two men came into conflict over Brown's autocratic coaching style and his failure to notify Modell about personnel decisions. Brown had held almost complete control over football matters for almost two decades, but Modell was not willing to give Brown the free hand that previous owners had given him. Without informing Modell, Brown in 1962 traded away star halfback Bobby Mitchell for the right to draft Ernie Davis, a back who won the Heisman Trophy and surpassed Jim Brown's rushing records at Syracuse University. Davis died of leukemia before he played a down for the Browns. Another source of tension between Paul Brown and Modell was Brown's relationship with Jim Brown, the team's star fullback. Jim Brown grew increasingly independent as he rose to fame. He started a weekly radio show, which grated against Paul Brown's emphasis on discipline and teamwork over individualism. Other players, including quarterback Milt Plum, openly questioned Paul Brown's coaching and his control over the team's play-calling.

Brown made some changes as a result of the pressure from his players and Modell, and allowed Collier to put into place a "check-off system" that allowed the quarterback to run several approved alternative plays to the ones Brown called. When Collier was praised in the Cleveland Press for instituting the system successfully, however, Brown put an end to it. "The players believed that Paul was upset when Blanton received some good press," former Browns quarterback Jim Ninowski said in 1997. "Paul just junked Blanton's system, as if to say, 'Hey, I'm running the show now'." As Collier grew apart from Brown, he became closer to Modell, who enjoyed discussing football minutiae with him.

After a 7–6–1 season in 1962, Modell fired Brown and offered the head-coaching job to Collier. Collier told Modell he first needed the blessing of his wife and of Brown, to whom he still felt a sense of loyalty. He called Brown, who told him he had to take the job because he had a family to support. Collier accepted a three-year contract that would pay him $35,000 a year (about $368,000 in 2025 dollars). In contrast with Brown, Collier was almost universally liked by players and other coaches. He was soft-spoken, which was unusual for a head coach, but he earned the respect of the team with his extensive knowledge and his willingness to give players more freedom than Brown ever did. One significant difference was his approach to play-calling. Like Brown, Collier served as his own play-caller. However, he let Frank Ryan, who replaced Plum as the team's starting quarterback in 1963, change plays at the line of scrimmage, and allowed more flexibility in pass routes and blocking schemes.

The changes paid off. In 1963, the team finished 10–4, and Jim Brown broke the NFL's single-season rushing record with 1,863 yards. Brown was also voted the league's Most Valuable Player. Cleveland, however, finished a game behind the New York Giants, and did not reach the championship game. The Browns had started out 6–0, but faltered after racial divisions cropped up within the team. Some black players believed white teammates were getting to play ahead of them because of their race. Toward the end of the season, Collier met with the team's leaders and told them the racism had to stop. After the season, he traded away players he thought were sowing discord and opened up a dialogue with those who remained to stamp out the tension.

=== 1964 championship ===
Cleveland climbed back to the top of the Eastern Conference in 1964 with a 10–3–1 record behind Jim Brown's league-leading 1,446 yards of rushing and reached the championship game against the Baltimore Colts. Most sportswriters predicted an easy win for the Colts, who led the league in scoring behind quarterback Johnny Unitas and halfback Lenny Moore. The Browns' defense, moreover, was suspect. The team gave up 20 more first downs than any other in the league. The teams, however, had not faced each other for three years. Before the game, Collier and Colts coach Don Shula agreed to give each other full access to video of regular-season games. Ever the student, Collier took full advantage of the opportunity. The Browns had run what was dubbed a "rubber band" pass defense, allowing short throws while trying to prevent big plays. The Colts' top receivers, however, Raymond Berry and Jimmy Orr, were not fast. They tended to pick apart defenses with short, tactical completions, which led Collier to institute a man-to-man pass defense for the game. This, he figured, would buy more time for the defensive line and force Unitas to scramble — not his forte.

The strategy worked, and in Cleveland Municipal Stadium two days after Christmas, the Browns beat the Colts 27–0. The Browns scored 10 points in the third quarter and a further 17 in the fourth, clinching the team's first title since Otto Graham's departure after the 1955 season.

=== Later Seasons ===
The Browns ended with an 11–3 record the following year, and comfortably won the East for the second year in a row. That set up a second straight appearance in the NFL Championship game, this time in Green Bay against the Packers. The teams battled it out on a slippery, mucky Lambeau Field on January 2, 1966. While score was close early on, Vince Lombardi's team held the Browns scoreless in the second half, winning 23–12 in an upset on a Paul Hornung touchdown. Despite Jim Brown's retirement after the 1965 season, the Browns had another four consecutive winning seasons and advanced to the NFL championship game in 1968 and 1969 under Collier, but lost both times.

Plagued by hearing problems, the 64-year-old coach announced his retirement before the end of the 1970 season, which the Browns finished with a 7–7 record. Collier told Modell that he could no longer hear his players, and it was difficult to read their lips through new face masks that obscured their mouths. Modell tried to help by getting Collier to try new hearing aids, and even sent him for acupuncture treatment, but none of it worked. Collier struggled during press conferences because he often could not hear what reporters were asking and answered the wrong questions. In eight years as coach, Collier led Cleveland to a championship and a 76–34–2 record. Nick Skorich, who came to the Browns as offensive coordinator in 1964, was named as his successor on January 7, 1971.

== Later life and death ==
Collier continued to work with the Browns after he stepped down, serving as a scout and quarterbacks coach until leaving the game for good in 1976. He was the coach of the college team in the 1971 College All-Star Game, a now-defunct matchup between the NFL champion and a selection of the best college players from around the country, replacing former Browns quarterback Otto Graham. Georgetown College in 1970 awarded him an honorary doctorate of laws degree.

Collier was diagnosed with prostate cancer in 1976, and retired to a house on a lake in Texas, where he played golf and visited with friends and family. He died of the disease in 1983. His wife died in 1996 and was buried next to him in Paris, Kentucky. Collier and his wife had three daughters, Carolyn, Jane, and Kay.

== Legacy ==
Collier was recognized after his death for his sportsmanship, intelligence, and mild manner. He was inducted into the University of Kentucky College of Education Hall of Fame in 2001. In 2007, the Kentucky chapter of the NFL Players Association established a Blanton Collier Award given annually to a football player or players who excel both on and off the field. Past winners include Tony Dungy, Jim Brown, Gale Sayers, and the Manning family: Archie, Olivia, Cooper, Peyton, and Eli. A group of former Kentucky players in 2008 started the Blanton Collier Sportsmanship Group, which promotes ethics, education, and integrity in sports. The nonprofit organization now oversees the Blanton Collier Award.

The Professional Football Researchers Association named Collier to the PFRA Hall of Very Good Class of 2009. Collier was inducted into the Kentucky Pro Football Hall of Fame in 2016.

The football stadium at Paris High School is named after Collier.

== Head coaching record ==
=== College ===
| Year | Team | Overall | Conference | Standing | Bowl/playoffs |
|---|---|---|---|---|---|
Kentucky Wildcats (Southeastern Conference) (1954–1961)
| 1954 | Kentucky | 7–3 | 5–2 | T–3rd | |
| 1955 | Kentucky | 6–3–1 | 3–3–1 | T–7th | |
| 1956 | Kentucky | 6–4 | 4–4 | 6th | |
| 1957 | Kentucky | 3–7 | 1–7 | 12th | |
| 1958 | Kentucky | 5–4–1 | 3–4–1 | T–6th | |
| 1959 | Kentucky | 4–6 | 1–6 | 10th | |
| 1960 | Kentucky | 5–4–1 | 2–4–1 | 9th | |
| 1961 | Kentucky | 5–5 | 2–4 | 8th | |
| Kentucky: | | 41–36–3 | 21–34–3 | | |
| Total: | | 41–36–3 | | | |

=== NFL ===
| Team | Year | Regular season | | | | | Postseason | | | |
| Team | Year | Won | Lost | Ties | Win % | Finish | Won | Lost | Win % | Result |
|---|---|---|---|---|---|---|---|---|---|---|
| CLE | 1963 | 10 | 4 | 0 | .714 | 2nd in Eastern Conference | – | – | – | – |
| CLE | 1964 | 10 | 3 | 1 | .750 | 1st in Eastern Conference | 1 | 0 | 1.000 | Beat Baltimore Colts in NFL Championship game |
| CLE | 1965 | 11 | 3 | 0 | .786 | 1st in Eastern Conference | 0 | 1 | .000 | Lost to Green Bay Packers in NFL Championship game |
| CLE | 1966 | 9 | 5 | 0 | .643 | 2nd in Eastern Conference | – | – | – | |
| CLE | 1967 | 9 | 5 | 0 | .643 | 1st in Century Division | 0 | 1 | .000 | Lost to Dallas Cowboys in Eastern conference championship game |
| CLE | 1968 | 10 | 4 | 0 | .714 | 1st in Century Division | 1 | 1 | .500 | Lost to Baltimore Colts in NFL Championship game |
| CLE | 1969 | 10 | 3 | 1 | .750 | 1st in Century Division | 1 | 1 | .500 | Lost to Minnesota Vikings in NFL Championship game |
| CLE | 1970 | 7 | 7 | 0 | .500 | 2nd in AFC Central | – | – | – | |
| CLE Total | | 76 | 34 | 2 | .688 | | 3 | 4 | .429 | |
Source: Pro-Football-Reference
