= Bill Yanchar =

American football player (1948-2024)

No. 75
- Position: Defensive tackle

Personal information
- Born: March 25, 1948; Euclid, Ohio, U.S.
- Died: May 29, 2024 (aged 76)
- Listed height: 6 ft 3 in (1.91 m)
- Listed weight: 251 lb (114 kg)

Career information
- High school: Euclid
- College: Purdue
- NFL draft: 1970: 10th round, 255th overall pick

Career history
- Cleveland Browns (1970–1971); Detroit Lions (1972)*; San Francisco 49ers (1973)*
- * Offseason or practice squad member only

William J. Yanchar (March 3, 1948-May 29, 2024) is an American former professional football player who was a defensive tackle for the Cleveland Browns of the National Football League (NFL). He played college football for the Purdue University
