= Don Gault =

American football player (born 1946)

No. 13, 11
- Position: Quarterback

Personal information
- Born: August 30, 1946 (age 80); Lynbrook, New York, U.S.
- Listed height: 6 ft 2 in (1.88 m)
- Listed weight: 190 lb (86 kg)

Career information
- High school: John Adams (Queens, New York)
- College: Hofstra
- NFL draft: 1968: undrafted

Career history
- Cleveland Browns (1968); Jersey Jays (1969); Cleveland Browns (1969–1970; San Diego Chargers (1972)*; Edmonton Eskimos (1972)*; New York Jets (1973)*; Long Island Chiefs (1973); New York Stars (1974)
- * Offseason or practice squad member only

Career NFL statistics
- Passing attempts: 19
- Passing completions: 2
- Completion percentage: 10.5%
- TD–INT: 0–3
- Passing yards: 67
- Passer rating: 2.2
- Stats at Pro Football Reference

Donald J. Gault (born August 30, 1946) is an American former professional football player who was a quarterback for the Cleveland Browns of the National Football League (NFL) in 1970. Over the course of his career, he played in two games, completed 2 of 19 passes for 67 yards, threw no touchdowns and three interceptions, and finished his career with a passer rating of 2.2.

Gault played college football for the Hofstra Pride, setting many school passing records. After graduating, he was signed by the Browns. The team kept him on the roster from 1968 to 1972, though he was only an active player in 1970. He played in two games and started one, earning a victory despite a passer rating of zero. After the Browns released him in 1972, he had offseason stints with the San Diego Chargers, Edmonton Eskimos, New York Jets, and New York Stars before retiring.

== College career ==
Gault played high school football for John Adams High School in Queens, then played college football at Hofstra University. After sitting out his freshman year, he was awarded the starting quarterback job as a sophomore in 1965. In his third start for the Pride, he completed 21 of 33 passes and threw for a school record 315 yards in a 35–13 win over Kings Point Academy. A month later, he broke his own record and threw for 345 yards after completing 17 of 25 passes in a 42–28 win over Temple. For the season he completed 158 passes for 20 touchdowns and 2,134 yards. Gault's junior year was considered to have been a disappointment due to ineffectiveness and a 2–8 overall record, but his career passing yards through two full seasons set a school record. Gault's senior season performances included a 325-yard, four touchdown performance, after which he was named to the weekly All-East All-Star football team. In his last collegiate game against C. W. Post College, he completed 11 of 20 passes for 220 yards in a 19–0 win, giving Hofstra an 8–2 record his senior year with seven of the eight wins being shutouts.

Over the course of his career, Gault broke Hofstra school records for passing yards and completions in a season and career, but also had 22 interceptions in 30 career games. After his graduation, coach Howdy Myers said of him, "he has a quick release and can throw accurately both long and short."

== Professional career ==
Gault went undrafted in the 1968 NFL/AFL draft, and was signed by the Cleveland Browns as a free agent. Heading into training camp, he was one of five quarterbacks looking for a roster spot, the others being Frank Ryan, Gary Lane, Dick Shiner, and fellow undrafted rookie Jim Alcorn. By the end of the preseason, Gault was cut from the active roster, and spent the 1968 season on the practice squad, but was noted as someone who could be the Browns' future starting quarterback. Before the 1969 season began, Gault joined the military reserves. While training at Fort Dix from June to November, he played in the Continental Football League with the Jersey Jays. After his training ended, he returned to the team's practice squad. He was placed on the active roster as a third-string emergency quarterback in case the Browns needed him during the postseason. During the offseason, Gault worked as an insurance broker while remaining on the Browns roster.

The Browns had three quarterbacks on their roster entering the 1970 season in Gault, Bill Nelsen, and Mike Phipps. As training camp began, Browns coach Blanton Collier planned to use Gault in exhibition games, as he was throwing the ball well in practice during the summer. By the end of preseason, Gault was named to the active roster as the Browns retained all three quarterbacks, an uncommon move at the time. During the Browns' second game against the San Francisco 49ers, starting quarterback Nelsen was injured, leading Gault to enter the game in the fourth quarter. He completed a pass to Gary Collins for 23 yards, threw an incompletion, and threw an interception to Dave Wilcox, allowing the 49ers to go on a game-winning drive in a 34-31 Browns loss.

Due to Nelsen's injury, Gault was given the start in next week's game against the Pittsburgh Steelers, facing off against fellow rookie and first overall draft pick, Terry Bradshaw. In his only career start, he completed one pass for 44 yards in 16 attempts, threw two interceptions, and finished the game with a 0.0 passer rating. He also led the Browns to only three first downs during the first half, and as a result Phipps took over at quarterback; the Browns went on to win the game, 15–7. Nelsen recovered from the injury the following week and turn back over for the Browns at quarterback; Gault did not play another snap that season. Entering the 1971 season, Gault modified his throwing style after discussion with new head coach Nick Skorich, and was throwing better in training camp as a result. After training camp ended, however, he was placed on the practice squad, where he remained throughout the season.

In 1972, the Browns drafted Brian Sipe, giving Gault competition for the third quarterback spot, which was noted as a main position battle in training camp for the Browns that season. At the end of training camp, Sipe won the job, and Gault was cut. He was picked up by the San Diego Chargers in late August. He competed with Wayne Clark for the backup quarterback job for a short time, and did not see any playing time for the Chargers before his release. He also spent time with the Edmonton Eskimos of the Canadian Football League, but did not see any playing time with them. He later noted that he was unable to adjust to the game of Canadian football, as he was unable to throw a spiral due to the football being shorter and fatter.

The New York Jets signed Gault as a free agent in 1973, and he was slated to compete with Al Woodall for the backup quarterback spot behind Joe Namath. At the end of preseason, he lost the backup spot to Woodall, and was released. The following year, Gault signed with the New York Stars of the new World Football League in April. After practicing with the team throughout the offseason, he was released in August, ending his professional career.
