= Jack Gregory (defensive end) =

American football player (1944–2019)

No. 81
- Position: Defensive end

Personal information
- Born: October 3, 1944; Okolona, Mississippi, U.S.
- Died: March 2, 2019 (aged 74); Amory, Mississippi, U.S.
- Listed height: 6 ft 5 in (1.96 m)
- Listed weight: 250 lb (113 kg)

Career information
- High school: Okolona
- College: Chattanooga; Delta State
- NFL draft: 1966: 9th round, 139th overall pick
- AFL draft: 1966: Red Shirt 1st round, 9th overall pick

Career history
- Cleveland Browns (1967–1971); New York Giants (1972–1978); Cleveland Browns (1979)

Awards and highlights
- Second-team All-Pro (1972); 2× Pro Bowl (1969, 1972); NFL sacks leader (1972); 74th greatest New York Giant of all-time

Career NFL statistics
- Fumble recoveries: 9
- Interceptions: 1
- Sacks: 106
- Stats at Pro Football Reference

Earl Jackson Gregory Jr. (October 3, 1944 – March 2, 2019) was an American professional football defensive end in the National Football League (NFL) who played for the Cleveland Browns and New York Giants in a 13-year career that lasted from 1967 through 1979. He is unofficially credited with 106 quarterback sacks for his career (41 with the Browns and 65 with the Giants). He has been unofficially credited with 14 or 15.5 quarterback sacks for the 1970 NFL season, the third best total in Browns' history. In 1972, he led the NFL in sacks with 18.5 or 21. He was twice selected to play in the Pro Bowl and was named an All-Pro in 1972. He has been considered among the top 100 players in both Cleveland Browns’ and New York Giants’ history.

== Early life ==
Gregory was born on October 3, 1944, in Okolona, Mississippi, to Earl Jackson "Jack" Sr. and Earlene (McComb) Gregory. He graduated from Okolona High School in 1962. He was an all-conference athlete in football, track, and baseball at Okolona.

== College career ==
Gregory received a football scholarship to attend the University of Tennessee at Chattanooga. Gregory's father had been a star tackle for the Chattanooga Moccasins (Mocs) football team. Gregory only learned years later that his father had discouraged schools such as the University of Mississippi from recruiting Gregory, because his father was determined that Gregory should attend Chattanooga.

Gregory was a two-way player on the football team. He played tight end on offense and defensive end on defense. In a mid-November 1964 game against Howard College (now Samford University), he returned an interception 50 yards for a touchdown with 25 seconds left in the game. Gregory was an Associated Press honorable mention Little All-American for the Mocs in 1965.

Although he was drafted by National Football League (NFL) and American Football League (AFL) teams in November 1965, he chose not to play professional football in 1966. Rather, Gregory transferred to Delta State College, where he played his senior year of college football. Gregory was 6 ft 4 in (1.93 m) 240 lb (108.9 kg) in his senior year at Delta State, again playing both defensive end and tight end. He set a school record with 40 receptions for 557 yards.

== Professional career ==
=== Cleveland Browns ===
The Cleveland Browns selected Gregory in the ninth round of the 1966 NFL draft, 139th overall. The Buffalo Bills selected Gregory in the first round of the 1966 AFL redshirt draft, 9th overall. After another year of college at Delta State College in 1966, Gregory chose to sign with the Cleveland Browns before the 1967 season. He believed that the NFL was the better league at that point, and Gregory wanted to prove himself at the highest level to the people in his hometown who doubted him, and thought he had only been given opportunities in college because of his father. Gregory also saw that the Browns had won their division the previous season.

Gregory started three gams at defensive end during his rookie season, as a backup to longtime Browns' defensive ends Paul Wiggin and Bill Glass. Gregory had one fumble recovery that season. Wiggin retired before the 1968 season and Glass was injured during that season. Gregory filled it at both defensive end positions in 1968, starting six games. He had 3.5 quarterback sacks that season. The Browns won their division that season, and then defeated the Dallas Cowboys in the divisional round of the playoffs, 31–20. Gregory started that game at left defensive end and had one sack. He also started at left defensive end in the 1968 NFL Championship Game, a 34–0 loss to the Baltimore Colts.

In 1969, Gregory started all 14 Browns' games at right defensive end. He had a team-leading 11 quarterback sacks, along with one interception and one fumble recovery. His 11 sacks were tied for seventh best in the NFL that season. He was selected to play in the Pro Bowl for the first time in his career. The Browns had a 10–3–1 record, winning their division. They defeated the Dallas Cowboys in the divisional round of the NFL playoffs, 38–14. Gregory had two quarterback sacks in that game. The Browns lost the 1969 NFL Championship Game to the Minnesota Vikings, 27–7, though Gregory had another sack in that game.

Gregory started all 14 games at right defensive end again in 1970. He had a team-leading 15.5 sacks on the season, and was second in the NFL in most sacks that year. He also had one fumble recovery. It has also been stated that he had 14 sacks in 1970, the second most in Browns history for a season (as of 2005). Bill Glass unofficially had 16 sacks for the Browns in 1960. In 2025, Myles Garrett set an NFL record with 23 sacks in a season, making Gregory at most third in team history. In 1971, Gregory again started all 14 games as the Browns' right defensive end, with a team-leading 8.5 sacks. He again had one fumble recovery.

==== Playing out option ====
Gregory did not sign a new contract with the Browns going into the 1971 season. He said in July 1971 that if the Browns and he did not agree to a new contract, he would play out his option and then go to another team. Playing out his option would make Gregory a free agent at the end of April 1972. However, under the NFL's Rozelle Rule any team signing him as a free agent would have to compensate the Browns with a player and/or draft picks; which compensation could be determined by NFL commissioner Pete Rozelle if the old and new teams could not agree. Gregory became the first Brown ever to play out his option.

Gregory had an agent by 1972 (Ed Keating) who was negotiating with the Browns to potentially stay with the team. A few days after Gregory became a free agent in early May 1972, and the negotiations were faltering, Browns' owner Art Modell was reported as saying "I feel it's absolutely insane for a player who has dealt with us to use an agent". Gregory later said that while financial issues were his principal consideration in choosing to leave the Browns, there was also some "personality conflict" between him and Browns' head coach Nick Skorich and it was time for a change.

Gregory and Keating were interested in six teams, and two others approached them. They ultimately reduced their interest to the New York Giants, St. Louis Cardinals and the Oakland Raiders. Modell was also negotiating with other NFL teams about players or draft picks those teams might give to the Browns as compensation for Gregory. Both Gregory's discussions, and Modell's efforts (that were described as "talking trade"), were limited by whether the Browns would accept the compensation offered for Gregory, and whether Gregory would agree to go to the team making the offer to the Browns.

In mid-June 1972, it was reported that in separate transactions on the same day (1) Gregory signed with the New York Giants as a free agent, and the Giants and Browns agreed the compensation would be a 1973 number one draft choice; and (2) the Browns traded Freddie Summers to the Giants for a 1973 number two draft choice. The first-round pick was later used by the Browns to select Steve Holden and the second-round pick used to select Greg Pruitt. Gregory chose the Giants as his destination of choice based on his discussions with Giants' defensive coach Jim Garrett and how Garrett intended to use Gregory if he came to the Giants.

==== Return to Browns ====
After spending seven years with the Giants (1972 to 1978), in early August 1979 Gregory was traded back to the Browns for an undetermined 1980 draft pick (which Modell made clear would not be a number 1 pick). At the time, Gregory had walked out of the Giants' training camp and demanded a trade. After the trade, he reportedly said "Cleveland–that's my town. I've been sorry ever since I left". Similarly, Art Modell said "I'm very sorry he left Cleveland". In his final NFL season, the 35-year old Gregory started 11 games for the Browns at right defensive end, with 2.5 sacks and one fumble recovery. In January 1980, the Browns chose not to re-sign Gregory.

During his six years with the Browns, Gregory started 62 games with 41 sacks, five fumble recoveries and an interception. He also had four quarterback sacks and a fumble recovery in six playoff games with the Browns.

=== New York Giants ===
In 1972, under defensive coach Jim Garrett, the Giants adopted a defensive scheme that used Gregory as a "rover" on defense. Under this system, modeled on the 1967 Oakland Raiders' defense, Garrett kept three Giants' defensive linemen stationary, while allowing Gregory to play multiple positions across the defensive front, including anywhere on the defensive line or at linebacker. Garrett chose Gregory as the Giants' rover because he believed Gregory was a great athlete who had the inherent natural ability to be an excellent pass rusher. The Giants were confident in Gregory, and allowed him to make his own decisions about where to position himself on defense as a rover. Gregory became known as "Rover" on the team.

Gregory started all 14 games for the Giants and unofficially led the NFL with 18.5 sacks (sacks not becoming an official statistic until 1982). He was also said to have had 21 sacks in 1972. He was selected to the Pro Bowl for the second time. He was named first team All-Pro by the Newspaper Enterprise Association, Pro Football Weekly and the Pro Football Writers of America, and second-team All-Pro by the Associated Press (AP). The AP and United Press International named Gregory first-team All-National Football Conference. The Giants' record went from 4–10 in 1971, to 8–6 in 1972. In 1971, the Giants had only 18 sacks as a team and allowed 362 points, whereas in 1972 the team had 37 sacks and allowed only 247 points.

Gregory's personal life was in turmoil before the 1973 season. His 690-acre farm had flooded in the spring. Then his son E.J. Gregory III was born prematurely and suffered with Hyaline membrane disease; and would remain in the hospital for a year. Gregory would travel between New York and Okolona during the playing year. Gregory started 13 games for the Giants that season, with 8.5 sacks. The Giants finished the season 2–11–1.

The Giants ceased using the rover defense entering the 1974 season under new head coach Bill Arnsparger, who had just won Super Bowl VIII as defensive coach of the 1973 Miami Dolphins. Arnsparger stated in March 1974 that he saw Gregory as a right defensive end, not a rover. Arnsparger hired Floyd Peters as his defensive line coach. The Giants record fell to 2–12 in 1974. Gregory started 14 games at right defensive end, with 9.5 sacks that year.

In 1975, Gregory again started all 14 games for the Giants at right defensive end. He had 14 sacks on the season and one fumble recovery. The Giants improved to 5–9. The Giants credited him with 15 sacks that season. He was tied for fifth most sacks in the NFL that season. He was the Giants most valuable player and the team's defensive player of the year in 1975.

The Giants fired Arnsparger after losing the first seven games of the 1976 season, replacing him with John McVay, who led the team to a 3–4 record to finish the season. Gregory was a team captain in 1976. He started 11 games with 4.5 sacks that season. He suffered a season-ending knee injury against the Denver Broncos in the 11th game that season after being hit with a crackback block. Gregory had knocked quarterback Steve Ramsey out of the game a few plays earlier, and he believed that Broncos' running back Otis Armstrong could have delivered the crackback block that injured Gregory's knee, in retribution.

Gregory played two more seasons for the Giants (1977 and 1978), starting all 30 games at right defensive end. He had 7.5 sacks in 1977 and 2.5 in 1978. He also had one forced fumble and three fumble recoveries during this period. In early August 1979, Gregory left the Giants training camp, asking to be traded. The Giants traded him to the Cleveland Browns.

During his seven years with the Giants, Gregory started all 96 games in which he appeared for the Giants. He had 65 sacks, four fumble recoveries and at least one forced fumble. The Giants credited him with 75.5 sacks during his career with them, and 21 sacks in 1972.

== Legacy and honors ==
In 1970, Gregory played in the first Monday Night Football game, a 31–21 Browns win over the New York Jets. Gregory sacked Jets future Hall of Fame quarterback Joe Namath twice, and also recovered a fumble at the Browns' two-yard line. Quarterback Archie Manning, who played against Gregory, said that Gregory was a great player and "Whenever we played against him, we had to keep an extra guy in to block him". Gregory played hard against quarterbacks when he hit or sacked them. In his career, Gregory broke the legs of Sonny Jurgensen and John Brodie, busted Billy Kilmer's face, broke Bert Jones' ribs and gave Steve Ramsey a concussion.

He was inducted into the Mississippi Sports Hall of Fame in 2000. In 2012, one Cleveland publication listed him as the 70th best player in Browns' history. He was considered to have a good combination of speed and strength at defensive end, making him both a top pass rusher and tough run defender. He was named the 74th greatest Giants’ player on its 100th Anniversary Team.

In addition to being called Rover in New York for a short time, his more long-lasting nickname was "Big Jack".

== Personal life and death ==
During the off seasons of his playing career, Gregory worked on his farm in Okolona. In 1973, Gregory and his wife Gwen (Massey) Gregory had a son, E.J., who was born prematurely and spent the first year of his life in the hospital. Gwen died of cancer in 1988, at age 40. After retiring from professional football, Gregory continued living in Okolona. He farmed, raised cattle and was a professional auctioneer. He lost his farm in 1984, due to a downturn in the economy; though Gregory later repurchased 500 acres of his farm. Gregory was the executive director of the Mississippi Association of Supervisors for 11 years. He was a member of the Okolona Presbyterian Church and was a member of the Mississippi National Guard. He also served as a scout for the Denver Broncos.

After the birth of his son E.J., while watching an Easter Seals telethon in Mississippi on which Archie Manning was a guest, Gwen encouraged Gregory to go to the studio and volunteer with the Easter Seals campaign. Gregory did that and became involved in Mississippi and then nationally with the Easter Seals campaign for many years. Gregory was its national campaign chair for a number of years, and national board president in 1988. In February 1990, he received an award from the Mississippi Easter Seals Society, whose president said of Gregory in response to the question "What is the net worth of a man's life?": "You measure it with the assets on the left and the liabilities on the right. The good deeds on the left, the bad on the right . . . Well Jack, there is no doubt you are a very wealthy man".

Gregory's father, Jack Gregory Sr., played guard with the Cleveland Rams in the early 1940s, and is a member of the University of Tennessee at Chattanooga Hall of Fame.

Gregory died March 2, 2019, in Monroe County, Mississippi. Gregory was survived by his second wife Susan (Brooks) Gregory, who he had married in 2000, his son E.J. and daughter Madison, as well as two stepchildren, and five grandchildren.
