= Fritz Heisler =

American football player and coach (1915–1982)

- Heisler in 1946

Personal information
- Born: May 18, 1915
- Died: March 11, 1982 (aged 66); Cleveland, Ohio

Career information
- High school: Washington (Massillon, Ohio)
- College: Miami (OH) (1934–1937)

Career history

Coaching
- Washington HS (OH) (1938–1940) Assistant; Ohio State (1941) Freshmen; DePauw (1943) V-5 coach; Cleveland Browns (1946–1958) Guards coach; Cleveland Browns (1959) Guards & co-defensive line coach; Cleveland Browns (1960–1962) Guards coach; Cleveland Browns (1963–1965) Offensive line coach; Cleveland Browns (1966–1967) Guards coach; Cleveland Browns (1968–1970) Offensive line coach

Operations
- Cleveland Browns (1972–1976) Scout

Awards and highlights
- 4× NFL champion (1950, 1954, 1955, 1964); 4× AAFC champion (1946–1949)

Frederick K. "Fritz" Heisler (May 18, 1915 – March 11, 1982) was a professional American football coach who was an assistant and scout for the Cleveland Browns for 30 years between 1946 and 1976. He was a long-time associate of Paul Brown, the first coach of the team.

Heisler played for Brown when Brown was head coach at Massillon Washington High School before attending Miami University, where he was a standout as a guard. After graduating, he returned to Massillon to serve as an assistant under Brown. Heisler followed Brown to Ohio State University in 1941 when Brown became head coach there, but left the following year for a stint in the U.S. Navy during World War II. After the war, Brown was named head coach of the Browns and hired Heisler as an assistant. He retired from coaching in 1971 but remained a scout for the Browns until 1976. He died in 1982 during surgery in Cleveland. Heisler was inducted into Miami's athletics hall of fame in 2006 and Miami's Cradle of Coaches Association in 2016.

== Early life and college ==
Heisler grew up in Ohio and attended Massillon Washington High School in Massillon, Ohio. He tried out for the school's football team in 1932 despite weighing only 135 pounds – undersized for a football player. He made the team under head coach Paul Brown, however, and was a regular starting in 1933, the first of a series of strong seasons. After graduating from Massillon, Heisler enrolled at Miami University in his home state. By then weighing 155 pounds, he won All-Ohio honors as a guard on the football team between 1935 and 1937.

== Coaching career ==
After college, Heisler came back to Massillon as an assistant to Brown. When Brown became the head coach at Ohio State University, Heisler went with him, coaching the freshman football team in 1941. He then enlisted in the U.S. Navy during World War II, and coached a V-5 team at Depauw University in 1943.

When the war ended, Brown was hired to coach the Cleveland Browns, a team under formation in the new All-America Football Conference (AAFC). Brown brought Heisler onto his staff as a guard coach, tutoring linemen on both offense and defense. Heisler coached players including Bill Willis and Weldon Humble as the Browns won all four of the AAFC's championships between 1946 and 1949. After the AAFC dissolved, the Browns moved to the more established National Football League starting in 1950. The team won NFL championships in 1950, 1954 and 1955. and 1964.

Heisler transitioned from coaching on offense and defense to working primarily with the team's offensive line in the 1950s. He stayed on after Brown was fired in 1963, and remained Cleveland's top offensive line coach until retiring in 1971. After serving as a scout for the team for another five years, he left football for good in 1976.

== Later life and death ==
Heisler retired to Aurora, Ohio. He suffered a stroke in 1977 that limited him physically, and he died five years later at the Cleveland Clinic during brain surgery. He was married to Evelyn Heisler and had four sons. Heisler was inducted into Miami University's athletics hall of fame in 2006. Heisler was inducted into Miami University's Cradle of Coaches Association in 2016
