= Chuck Reynolds =

American football player (born 1946)

No. 55
- Positions: Center, offensive guard

Personal information
- Born: October 5, 1946 (age 80); Fort Worth, Texas, U.S.
- Listed height: 6 ft 2 in (1.88 m)
- Listed weight: 240 lb (109 kg)

Career information
- High school: Arlington Heights (Fort Worth)
- College: TCU (1964); Tulsa (1965–1968)
- NFL draft: 1969: 8th round, 202nd overall pick

Career history
- Cleveland Browns (1969–1970)

Career NFL statistics
- Games played: 25
- Fumble recoveries: 3
- Stats at Pro Football Reference

Charles Robert Reynolds (born October 5, 1946) is an American former professional football player who played two seasons with the Cleveland Browns of the National Football League (NFL). He was selected by the Browns in the eighth round of the 1969 NFL/AFL draft. He played college football at Texas Christian University and the University of Tulsa.

== Early life ==
Charles Robert Reynolds was born on October 5, 1946, in Fort Worth, Texas. He attended Arlington Heights High School in Fort Worth and graduated in 1964.

== College career ==
Reynolds was a member of the TCU Horned Frogs of Texas Christian University in 1964. He was then a member of the Tulsa Golden Hurricane of the University of Tulsa from 1965 to 1968. He was a two-year letterman in 1966 and 1967. He majored in business management and marketing at Tulsa.

== Professional career ==
Reynolds was selected by the Cleveland Browns in the eighth round, with the 202nd overall pick, of the 1969 NFL/AFL draft. He was placed on the team's taxi squad on September 20. He later played in 11 games for the Browns during the 1969 season, recording three fumble recoveries. He also appeared in two playoff games that year. He was listed as an offensive guard in 1969. Reynolds played in all 14 games in 1970 and scored a safety. He was listed as a center that season. He was released by the Browns in 1971. He signed with the team again in 1972 but was later released.

== Personal life ==
Reynolds graduated from Dallas Theological Seminary with a Masters in Theology Emphasis and became a church pastor. He also worked at Manhattan Construction, Orbit Valve Company and Kimray Corporation.
