= Dave Jones (American football) =

American football player (born 1947)

No. 41
- Position: Wide receiver

Personal information
- Born: August 10, 1947 (age 79); Goodland, Kansas, U.S.
- Listed height: 6 ft 2 in (1.88 m)
- Listed weight: 192 lb (87 kg)

Career information
- High school: Goodland (Kansas)
- College: Kansas State (1965—1968)
- NFL draft: 1969: 11th round, 280th overall pick

Career history
- Cleveland Browns (1969–1971)

Awards and highlights
- 2× First-team All-Big Eight (1967, 1968); Second-team All-Big Eight (1966)

Career NFL statistics
- Receptions: 6
- Receiving yards: 99
- Stats at Pro Football Reference

David Ray Jones (born August 10, 1947) is an American former professional football player who was a wide receiver for three seasons with the Cleveland Browns of the National Football League (NFL). He was selected by the Browns in the eleventh round of the 1969 NFL/AFL draft after playing college football for the Kansas State Wildcats.

== Early life ==
David Ray Jones was born on August 10, 1947, in Goodland, Kansas. He was originally supposed to attend Kanorado High School but decided to move in with his grandmother to attend Goodland High School after Kanorado had plans to drop football.

== College career ==
Jones was a member of the Wildcats at Kansas State University from 1965 to 1968 and a three-year letterman from 1966 to 1968. He caught 35 passes for 721 yards and one touchdown in 1966, earning Associated Press (AP) second-team All-Big Eight Conference honors. His 20.6 yards per catch was the most in the Big Eight that year. He recorded 46 receptions for 561 yards in 1967, leading the Big Eight in both categories that season and also garnering AP first-team All-Big Eight recognition.

As a senior in 1968, Jones totaled 46 catches for 622 yards and four touchdowns, earning AP and United Press International first-team All-Big Eight honors.

== Professional career ==
Jones was selected by the Cleveland Browns in the 11th round, with the 280th overall pick, of the 1969 NFL draft. He played in 13 games for the Browns in 1969, catching two passes for 33 yards. He also appeared in two playoff games that year, recording one reception for 17 yards. Jones played in all 14 games during the 1970 season and recovered one fumble. He appeared in all 14 games for the second straight season in 1971, totaling four receptions for 66 yards, nine punt returns for 63 yards, and one fumble recovery. He also played in one playoff game that year, returning one punt for three yards. Jones was released by the Browns in 1972.
