= Joe Righetti =

American football player (born 1947)

No. 70
- Position: Defensive tackle

Personal information
- Born: December 31, 1947 (age 78); Fredericktown, Pennsylvania, U.S.
- Listed height: 6 ft 2 in (1.88 m)
- Listed weight: 253 lb (115 kg)

Career information
- High school: Bethlehem-Center (Fredericktown)
- College: Waynesburg
- NFL draft: 1969: 6th round, 150th overall pick

Career history
- Cleveland Browns (1969–1970)
- Stats at Pro Football Reference

Joseph William Righetti (born December 31, 1947) is an American former professional football player who was a defensive tackle for two seasons with the Cleveland Browns of the National Football League (NFL). He was selected by the Browns in the sixth round of the 1969 NFL/AFL draft. He played college football for the Waynesburg Yellow Jackets.

== Early life ==
Righetti played high school football at Bethlehem-Center High School in Fredericktown, Pennsylvania. He was named most valuable lineman in his senior year.

== College career ==
Righetti was a four-year starter for the Yellow Jackets at Waynesburg University. He earned NAIA All-American and NAIA All-District honors. He was also a Pennsylvania All-State West Penn Conference selection. Righetti set a record with eighteen individual tackles in a game against the Muskingum Fighting Muskies. He also participated in wrestling and track, placing fourth in the 1966 and 1967 NAIA National Wrestling Tournament and set the school record in the shot put. He was inducted into the Waynesburg College Sports Hall of Fame for both football and wrestling.

== Professional career ==
Righetti was selected in the sixth round by the Cleveland Browns with the 150th overall pick in the 1969 NFL/AFL draft. He appeared in 23 games for the Browns from 1969 to 1970 before injuries shortened his career.

== Personal life ==
Righetti coached high school football for nine years after his playing career and was also a teacher at Whippany Park High School in New Jersey.
