= Tom Beutler =

American football player (born 1946)

No. 53, 50
- Position: Linebacker

Personal information
- Born: September 29, 1946 (age 80); Bluffton, Ohio, U.S.
- Listed height: 6 ft 1 in (1.85 m)
- Listed weight: 234 lb (106 kg)

Career information
- High school: Central Catholic (Toledo, Ohio)
- College: Toledo (1964-1967)
- NFL draft: 1968: 12th round, 319th overall pick

Career history
- Cleveland Browns (1970); Baltimore Colts (1971); Memphis Southmen (1974)

Awards and highlights
- First-team All-American (1967)

Career NFL statistics
- Games played: 8
- Games started: 5
- Stats at Pro Football Reference

Thomas Joseph Beutler (born September 29, 1946) is an American former professional football player who was a linebacker in the National Football League (NFL). He played college football for the Toledo Rockets.

Beutler was born in Bluffton, Ohio, and attended Central Catholic High School in Toledo, Ohio. He played college football at the University of Toledo from 1964 to 1967. Rockets coach Frank Lauterbur called him "the finest lineman I ever coached."

Beutler was selected 319th overall by the Cleveland Browns in the 12th round of the 1968 NFL/AFL draft by the Cleveland Browns. He tried out with the Browns in 1968 but was relegated to the reserve squad after sustaining a hamstring injury. He returned to the practice squad again in 1969 after pulling as stomach muscle. In 1970, he survived the final cuts and played as a middle linebacker for the Browns, appearing in four games. Prior to the 1971 season, the Browns traded Beutler to the Baltimore Colts. At Baltimore, he played mostly on special teams and earned a reputation as a hard tackler. He appearing in four games. During the 1970 and 1971 seasons, he appeared in eight NFL games, five of them as a starter.

Beutler also played for the Memphis Southmen in the World Football League in 1974. He announced his retirement from professional football in June 1975.
