= Chip Glass (American football) =

American football player (born 1947)

No. 83
- Position: Tight end

Personal information
- Born: June 25, 1947 (age 79); Homestead, Florida, U.S.
- Listed height: 6 ft 4 in (1.93 m)
- Listed weight: 235 lb (107 kg)

Career information
- High school: Tampa (FL) Chamberlain
- College: Florida State
- NFL draft: 1969: 3rd round, 72nd overall pick

Career history
- Cleveland Browns (1969–1973); New York Giants (1974)

Career NFL statistics
- Receptions: 34
- Receiving yards: 642
- Touchdowns: 5
- Stats at Pro Football Reference

Charles Ferdinand "Chip" Glass (born June 25, 1947) is an American former professional football player who was a tight end for six seasons with the Cleveland Browns and New York Giants of the National Football League (NFL). He played college football for the Florida State Seminoles.

Glass graduated from Chamberlain High School in 1965 where he earned All-City and All-Conference lineman and outstanding leadership awards, was Captain of the football team and homecoming king.
