= Joe Taffoni =

American football player (1945–2021)

No. 62, 72
- Positions: Tackle, Guard

Personal information
- Born: March 27, 1945; Brownsville, Pennsylvania, U.S.
- Died: July 26, 2021 (aged 76); Chapin, South Carolina, U.S.
- Listed height: 6 ft 3 in (1.91 m)
- Listed weight: 255 lb (116 kg)

Career information
- High school: Carmichaels (Carmichaels, Pennsylvania)
- College: West Virginia (1963-1965); Tennessee-Martin (1966)
- NFL draft: 1967: 4th round, 98th overall pick

Career history
- Cleveland Browns (1967–1970); Los Angeles Rams (1971)*; New York Giants (1971–1973)
- * Offseason or practice squad member only

Career NFL statistics
- Games played: 78
- Games started: 38
- Fumble recoveries: 2
- Stats at Pro Football Reference

Joseph Albert Taffoni Jr. (March 27, 1945 – July 26, 2021) was an American professional football offensive lineman who played six seasons in the National Football League (NFL) with the Cleveland Browns and New York Giants. He was selected by the Browns in the fourth round of the 1967 NFL/AFL draft. He played college football at West Virginia University and the University of Tennessee at Martin.

== Early life and college ==
Joseph Albert Taffoni Jr. was born on March 27, 1945, in Brownsville, Pennsylvania. He participated in football, baseball, and track at Carmichaels High School in Carmichaels, Pennsylvania. He was a fullback and defensive tackle in football and a catcher in baseball. Taffoni earned all-state honors in football. He was inducted into the Washington-Greene County Chapter of the Pennsylvania Sports Hall of Fame in 2022.

Taffoni was a member of the West Virginia Mountaineers of West Virginia University (WVU) from 1963 to 1965, and a two-year letterman from 1964 to 1965. He was then a letterman for the Tennessee–Martin Pacers of the University of Tennessee, Martin Branch in 1966. Taffoni was team captain during his one year at Tennessee–Martin. He was inducted into Tennessee–Martin's athletics hall of fame in 1989.

== Professional career ==
Taffoni was selected by the Cleveland Browns in the fourth round, with the 98th overall pick, of the 1967 NFL draft. He played in all 14 games for the Browns during his rookie year in 1967. He also appeared in one playoff game that year. Taffoni played in 13 games during the 1968 season, recovering one fumble. He also played in two postseason games. He played in all 14 games, starting one, for Cleveland in 1969. Taffoni appeared in two playoff games for the second consecutive season as well. He started all 14 games for the Browns in 1970 as the team went 7–7. He left Browns camp on July 27, 1971. Two days later, it was reported that he had requested a trade.

On July 31, 1971, Taffoni was traded to the Los Angeles Rams for a player to be named later and two undisclosed draft picks. Shortly thereafter on August 12, 1971, he was traded to the New York Giants for Rich Buzin. After only a few days with the Giants, he walked out of camp on August 17, 1971. It was reported that he was retiring and going into coaching. However, Taffoni decided to return to the Giants in 1972 and started all 14 games for them that year. The Giants finished the 1972 season with an 8–6 record. Taffoni played in nine games, all starts, in 1973. On November 30, 1973, he had surgery to remove bone chips in his elbow. He retired after the season to become an assistant coach at the University of Tennessee at Chattanooga, where he spent five years.

== Personal life ==
Taffoni was a teacher and coach at Holy Cross High School in Delran Township, New Jersey for 21 years before retiring in 2011. His son, Matt Taffoni, also played at WVU as a linebacker from 1991 to 1994.

Taffoni died on July 26, 2021, in Chapin, South Carolina after a two-year bout with primary CNS lymphoma.
