= Gene Hickerson =

American football player (1935–2008)

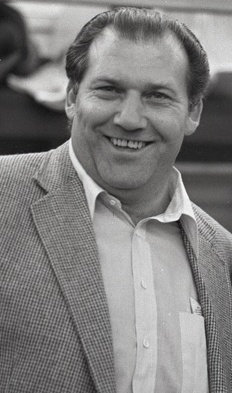
- Hickerson in 1979

No. 66
- Position: Guard

Personal information
- Born: February 15, 1935; Trenton, Tennessee, U.S.
- Died: October 20, 2008 (aged 73); Cleveland, Ohio, U.S.
- Listed height: 6 ft 3 in (1.91 m)
- Listed weight: 248 lb (112 kg)

Career information
- High school: Trezevant (TN)
- College: University of Mississippi
- NFL draft: 1957: 7th round, 78th overall pick

Career history
- Cleveland Browns (1958–1960, 1962–1973)

Awards and highlights
- NFL champion (1964); 5× First-team All-Pro (1966–1970); 2× Second-team All-Pro (1964, 1965); 6× Pro Bowl (1965–1970); NFL 1960s All-Decade Team; Cleveland Browns Ring of Honor; First-team All-SEC (1957)

Career NFL statistics
- Games played: 202
- Games started: 183
- Fumble recoveries: 7
- Stats at Pro Football Reference
- Pro Football Hall of Fame

Robert Gene Hickerson (February 15, 1935 – October 20, 2008) was an American professional football player who was an offensive guard for 15 years with the Cleveland Browns of the National Football League (NFL) from 1958 to 1960 and 1962 to 1973. Hickerson was a six-time Pro Bowler from 1965 to 1970. He was inducted to the Pro Football Hall of Fame on August 4, 2007.

== Early life ==
Hickerson was born on February 15, 1935, in Trenton, Tennessee located in Gibson County, but played fullback at Trezevant High School in neighboring Carroll County. He and his brother Willie played together on Trezevant's football team, and would go on to play football together in college, including in the Sugar Bowl.

== College career ==
Hickerson became a tackle at the University of Mississippi (Ole Miss). He was recruited to Ole Miss by Junie Hovious. Per the Pro Football Hall of Fame, Hickerson was considered one of the best offensive linemen in Southeastern Conference (SEC) history at the end of his collegiate career.

Hickerson's 1955 Ole Miss team won the SEC title, and on January 1, 1956, the team won the Cotton Bowl over Texas Christian University. Hickerson served as co-captain on the 1957 Ole Miss team, and was a consensus All-Southeastern Conference and All-South choice. On January 1, 1958, Ole Miss played in the Sugar Bowl, defeating the University of Texas 39-7. During his three varsity years, Ole Miss's record was 10-1, 7-3 and 9-1-1. Hickerson was voted onto the All-Time Sugar Bowl Team.

Hickerson played in the Senior Bowl and the Chicago College All-Star Game. In 1979, he entered the Mississippi Sports Hall of Fame, and in 1988, he was selected to Ole Miss Sports Hall of Fame. In 1993, Ole Miss fans voted Hickerson onto its Team of the Century (1893-1992).

== Professional career ==
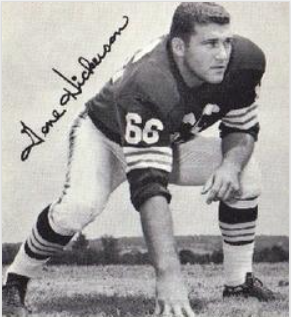
1962 stamp of Hickerson for Cleveland Browns

Gene was drafted in the seventh round of the 1957 NFL draft by the Browns. He was promptly shifted from tackle to the guard position on the offensive line in 1958 to better utilize his speed, which was unusually fast for a lineman and made him valuable as a pulling guard. He originally was used as a "messenger" guard by Coach Paul Brown, or a guard that delivered the plays in the huddle, while blocking for Hall of Famers Jim Brown, Bobby Mitchell, and Leroy Kelly. But after three seasons in the league, he broke his leg in 1961 and fractured the leg again later in the season while watching a game from the sidelines.

After missing two games in 1962, he recovered from the injury and never missed another game in his professional tenure. Hickerson only earned accolades after Jim Brown had retired and he was blocking for Leroy Kelly, but he earned first-team All-NFL honors five straight seasons from 1966 to 1970 and was voted to six consecutive Pro Bowls from 1966 to 1971. During his career, Hickerson's Browns never experienced a losing season and was a starter in four NFL title games, including a 1964 NFL Championship win over the Baltimore Colts 27–0. In his ten pro seasons, the Browns featured a 1,000-yard rusher every season but one in the era where the NFL season consisted of 14 games. They also had the NFL's leading rusher seven seasons of those ten.

== Legacy ==
He was elected to the Browns' legends team and the NFL 1960s All-Decade Team. In 2003, he was named to the Professional Football Researchers Association Hall of Very Good in the association's inaugural HOVG class.

Hickerson was inducted into the National Football League Hall of Fame in 2007. Jim Brown, one of the greatest college and professional football players of all time, and the first person selected to the NFL's 100th Anniversary team, considered Hickerson "'the greatest downfield blocker in the history of pro football.'"

In 2007, during his induction at the Pro Football Hall of Fame in Canton, Ohio, and already suffering from the health problems that plagued the final years of his life, including dementia, Hickerson was brought onstage in his wheelchair, propelled by Bobby Mitchell, Jim Brown, and Leroy Kelly. It was announced as "one last time, Gene Hickerson leads Bobby Mitchell, Jim Brown, and Leroy Kelly." He was inducted by his friend and former teammate at the University of Mississippi and the Cleveland Browns, Bobby Franklin. His hall of fame bust was presented to Ole Miss in 2013.

== Death ==
On October 20, 2008, Hickerson died just outside Cleveland, Ohio. The Browns added a "GH" tribute badge to their helmets for the 2008 season in his honor. The question has been raised as to whether football related chronic traumatic encephalopathy contributed to his dementia and death.
