= Freddie Summers =

American football player (born 1947)

No. 20
- Position: Defensive back

Personal information
- Born: February 16, 1947; Columbia, South Carolina, U.S.
- Died: December 7, 1994 (aged 47); Randolph, Massachusetts, U.S.
- Listed height: 6 ft 1 in (1.85 m)
- Listed weight: 180 lb (82 kg)

Career information
- High school: Dorchester (Dorchester, Massachusetts)
- College: McCook JC (1965–1966); Wake Forest (1967–1968)
- NFL draft: 1969: 4th round, 98th overall pick

Career history
- Cleveland Browns (1969–1971); New York Giants (1972)*
- * Offseason or practice squad member only

Awards and highlights
- First-team All-ACC (1967)
- Stats at Pro Football Reference

Freddie S. Summers (February 16, 1947 – December 7, 1994) was an American professional football player who was a defensive back for three seasons with the Cleveland Browns of the National Football League (NFL). He played college football for the Wake Forest Demon Deacons as a quarterback. He was selected by the Browns in the fourth round of the 1969 NFL/AFL draft.

== Early life ==
Freddie S. Summers was born on February 16, 1947, in Columbia, South Carolina. He attended Dorchester High School in Dorchester, Boston, Massachusetts.

== College career ==
Summers first played college football at McCook Junior College from 1965 to 1966. He transferred to play for the Wake Forest Demon Deacons from 1967 to 1968. In 1967, he became the first black quarterback to start for a major Southern university. He completed 77 of 159 passes (48.4%) for 909 yards, two touchdowns, and eight interceptions while also rushing for 510 yards and an Atlantic Coast Conference (ACC)-best ten touchdowns, earning first team All-ACC honors. He also led the ACC in total offense that season. In 1968, he completed 125 of 250 passes (50.0%) for 1,664 yards, nine touchdowns, and a conference-high 25 interceptions while rushing for 439 yards and seven touchdowns.

== Professional career ==
Summers was selected by the Cleveland Browns in the fourth round, with the 98th overall pick, of the 1969 NFL draft. He converted to defensive back with the Browns. He played in eight games, starting three, during his rookie year in 1969. He appeared in 12 games, no starts, in 1970 and made one fumble recovery. Summers played in three games, starting one, during his final season with the Browns in 1971.

On June 15, 1972, he was traded to the New York Giants in exchange for the Giants second pick in the 1973 NFL draft. He was placed on injured waivers on August 30, 1972.

== Death ==
Summers died on December 7, 1994, in Randolph, Massachusetts.
