= 1965 Minnesota Vikings season =

NFL team season

- General manager: Jim Finks
- Head coach: Norm Van Brocklin
- Home stadium: Metropolitan Stadium

Results
- Record: 7–7
- Division place: 5th NFL Western
- Playoffs: Did not qualify
- All-Pros: C Mick Tingelhoff (1st team); T Grady Alderman (2nd team); FB Bill Brown (2nd team)
- Pro Bowlers: T Grady Alderman; FB Bill Brown; QB Fran Tarkenton; C Mick Tingelhoff

Uniform
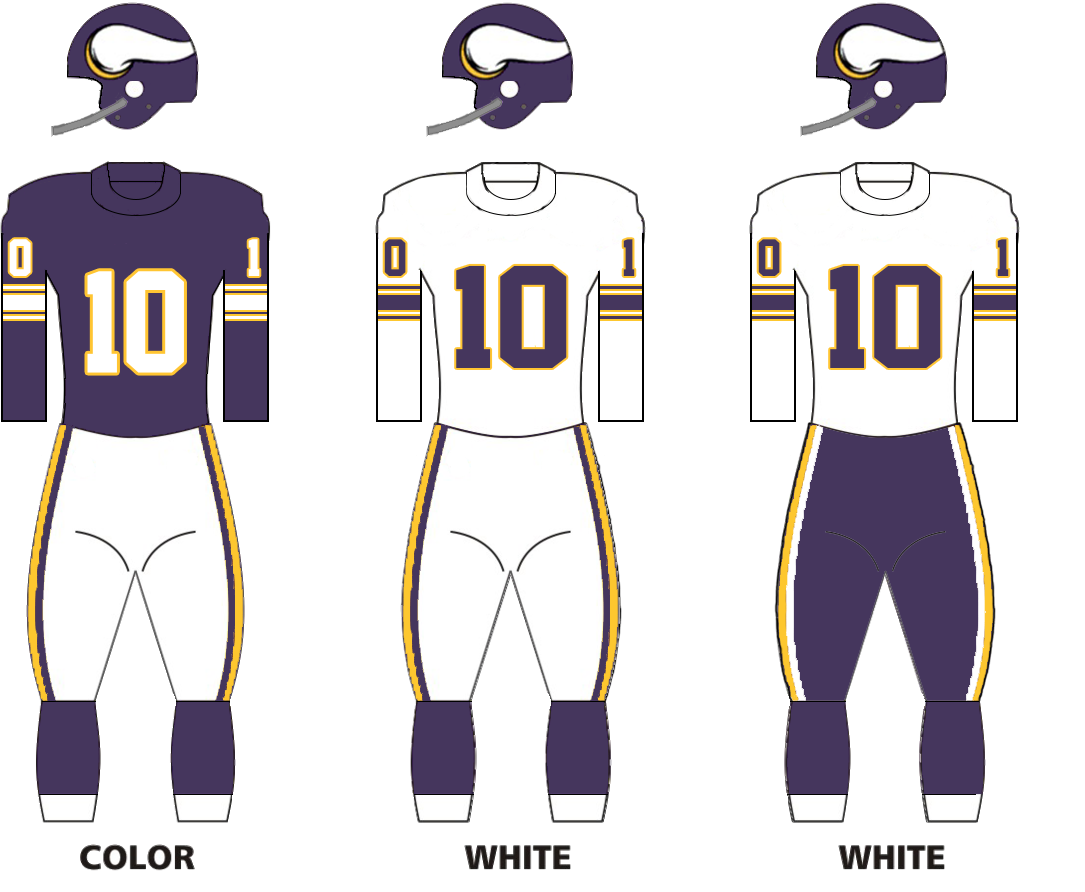

The 1965 season was the Minnesota Vikings' fifth in the National Football League (NFL). Under head coach Norm Van Brocklin, the team finished with a 7–7 record.

== Offseason ==
=== 1965 draft ===
Pro Bowler

1965 Minnesota Vikings Draft
Draft order		Player name	Position	College	Notes
Round	Selection	Player name	Position	College	Notes
1	8	Jack Snow	Wide receiver	Notre Dame	
2	15	Archie Sutton	Offensive tackle	Illinois	from Giants (Note: The Vikings traded RB Hugh McElhenny to the Giants in exchange for a second-round selection (15th overall) and a 1964 fourth-round selection (53rd overall).)
2	23	Lance Rentzel	Wide receiver	Oklahoma	
3	36	Traded to the Pittsburgh Steelers (Note: The Vikings traded their third-round selection (36th overall) to the Steelers in exchange for RB Bob Ferguson.)			
4	51	Jim Whalen	Wide receiver	Boston College	
4	55	Jim Harris	Offensive tackle	Utah State	from Browns (Note: The Vikings traded DT Mike Bundra to the Browns in exchange for a fourth-round selection (55th overall), and by some reports, they also traded their 1966 sixth-round selection (90th overall).)
5	64	Traded to the Detroit Lions (Note: The Vikings traded their fifth-round selection (64th overall) to the Lions in exchange for WR Tom Hall and HB Bruce Zellmer.)			
6	79	Jim Grisham	Running back	Oklahoma	
7	92	Traded to the Detroit Lions (Note: The Vikings traded their seventh-round selection (92nd overall) and a 1966 sixth-round selection (87th overall) to the Lions in exchange for DT Mike Bundra and end Larry Vargo.)			
8	100	John Hankinson	Quarterback	Minnesota	from 49ers (Note: The Vikings traded DT Roy Williams to the 49ers in exchange for an eighth-round selection (100th overall).)
8	107	Jeff Jordan	Defensive back	Tulsa	
9	120	Frank McClendon	Offensive tackle	Alabama	
10	135	Jerald Schweiger	Offensive tackle	Superior State	
11	148	John Thomas	Wide receiver	USC	
12	163	Mike Tilleman	Defensive tackle	Montana	
13	176	Dave Osborn	Running back	North Dakota	
14	191	Max Leetzow	Defensive end	Idaho	
15	204	Phillip Morgan	Running back	East Tennessee State	
16	219	Paul Labinski	Offensive tackle	St. John's (MN)	
17	232	Veran Smith	Running back	Utah State	
18	247	Rich Kotite	Wide receiver	Wagner	
19	260	Ellis Johnson	Running back	Southeastern Louisiana	
20	271	Cosmo Iacavazzi	Running back	Princeton	

== Roster ==
1965 Minnesota Vikings roster
Quarterbacks (QB): 17 Bob Berry; 10 Fran Tarkenton; 15 Ron Vander Kelen; Running backs (RB): 33 Billy Ray Barnes; 30 Bill Brown; 24 Phil King; 20 Tommy Mason; 41 Dave Osborn; 48 Jim Young; Wide receivers (WR): 85 Paul Flatley; 28 Tom Hall; 82 Jim Phillips; 19 Lance Rentzel; Tight ends (TE): 86 Hal Bedsole; 87 Gordon Smith	Offensive linemen (OL): 67 Grady Alderman T; 61 Larry Bowie G; 66 Ken Byers G; 73 Errol Linden T; 64 Milt Sunde G; 72 Archie Sutton T; 53 Mick Tingelhoff C; Defensive linemen (DL): 76 Paul Dickson DT; 81 Carl Eller DE; 77 Gary Larsen DT; 70 Jim Marshall DE; 79 Jim Prestel DT	Linebackers (LB): 58 Rip Hawkins MLB; 57 Bill Jobko OLB; 36 John Kirby OLB; 59 Lonnie Warwick OLB; 60 Roy Winston OLB; Defensive backs (DB): 22 Jeff Jordan FS; 29 Karl Kassulke SS; 46 Earsell Mackbee CB; 44 George Rose CB; 45 Ed Sharockman CB/SS; 25 Larry Vargo FS; Special teams (ST): 14 Fred Cox K; 39 Bobby Walden P	Practice squad: 43 Gary Hill S; -- Frank McClendon T; -- Mike Tilleman DT; Reserve: 23 Lee Calland CB (IR); Rookies in italics

== Preseason ==
Game	Date	Opponent	Result	Record	Venue	Attendance
1	August 14	Pittsburgh Steelers	W 31–21	1–0	Atlanta Stadium (Atlanta, GA)	39,240
2	August 20	Philadelphia Eagles	W 35–21	2–0	Metropolitan Stadium	43,125
3	August 28	Washington Redskins	W 20–16	3–0	American Legion Memorial Stadium (Charlotte, NC)	20,426
4	September 3	Dallas Cowboys	W 57–17	4–0	Legion Field (Birmingham, AL)	41,500
5	September 11	New York Giants	W 24–9	5–0	Johnny Rosenblatt Stadium (Omaha, NE)	14,250

== Regular season ==
=== Schedule ===
Week	Date	Opponent	Result	Record	Venue	Attendance
1	September 19	at Baltimore Colts	L 16–35	0–1	Memorial Stadium	56,562
2	September 26	Detroit Lions	L 29–31	0–2	Metropolitan Stadium	46,826
3	October 3	at Los Angeles Rams	W 38–35	1–2	Los Angeles Memorial Coliseum	36,755
4	October 9	New York Giants	W 40–14	2–2	Metropolitan Stadium	44,283
5	October 17	Chicago Bears	L 37–45	2–3	Metropolitan Stadium	47,426
6	October 24	at San Francisco 49ers	W 42–41	3–3	Kezar Stadium	42,680
7	October 31	at Cleveland Browns	W 27–17	4–3	Cleveland Stadium	83,505
8	November 7	Los Angeles Rams	W 24–13	5–3	Metropolitan Stadium	47,426
9	November 14	Baltimore Colts	L 21–41	5–4	Metropolitan Stadium	47,426
10	November 21	Green Bay Packers	L 13–38	5–5	Metropolitan Stadium	47,426
11	November 28	San Francisco 49ers	L 24–45	5–6	Metropolitan Stadium	40,306
12	December 5	at Green Bay Packers	L 19–24	5–7	Lambeau Field	50,852
13	December 12	at Detroit Lions	W 29–7	6–7	Tiger Stadium	45,420
14	December 19	at Chicago Bears	W 24–17	7–7	Wrigley Field	46,604

Note: The game against the Giants, originally scheduled for Sunday, October 10, was brought forward to Saturday night because of the World Series.

== Standings ==
NFL Western Conference
	W	L	T	PCT	CONF	PF	PA	STK
Green Bay Packers	10	3	1	.769	8–3–1	316	224	T1
Baltimore Colts	10	3	1	.769	8–3–1	389	284	W1
Chicago Bears	9	5	0	.643	7–5	409	275	L1
San Francisco 49ers	7	6	1	.538	6–5–1	421	402	T1
Minnesota Vikings	7	7	0	.500	5–7	383	403	W2
Detroit Lions	6	7	1	.462	4–7–1	257	295	W1
Los Angeles Rams	4	10	0	.286	2–10	269	328	L1

Note: Tie games were not officially counted in the standings until 1972.

== Statistics ==
=== Team leaders ===
Category	Player(s)	Value
Passing yards	Fran Tarkenton	2,609
Passing touchdowns	Fran Tarkenton	19
Rushing yards	Bill Brown	699
Rushing touchdowns	Tommy Mason	10
Receiving yards	Paul Flatley	896
Receiving touchdowns	Paul Flatley	7
Points	Fred Cox	113
Kickoff return yards	Lance Rentzel	602
Punt return yards	Tommy Mason	63
Interceptions	Ed Sharockman	6
Sacks	Jim Marshall	7.5

Note that sack totals from 1960 to 1981 are considered unofficial by the NFL.

=== League rankings ===
Category	Total yards	Yards per game	NFL rank (out of 14)
Passing offense	2,546	181.9	8th
Rushing offense	2,278	162.7	2nd
Total offense	4,824	344.6	4th
Passing defense	2,493	178.1	6th
Rushing defense	1,755	125.4	9th
Total defense	4,248	303.4	7th
