= 1965 New York Giants season =

NFL team season

- Owner: Wellington Mara
- Head coach: Allie Sherman
- Home stadium: Yankee Stadium

Results
- Record: 7–7
- Division place: T-2nd NFL Eastern
- Playoffs: Did not qualify

The 1965 New York Giants season was the franchise's 41st season in the National Football League. The Giants were led by fifth-year head coach Allie Sherman and finished with a 7–7 record, which placed them in a tie for second in the Eastern Conference with the Dallas Cowboys, four games behind the Cleveland Browns. The Cowboys won both meetings with the Giants and gained the berth as the conference runner-up in the third place Playoff Bowl in Miami.

== Offseason ==
- January 22, 1965: Y. A. Tittle, 38, announced his retirement from professional football.
- June 29, 1965: Giants president Jack Mara died at age 57.
- July 1965: Head coach Allie Sherman signed a ten-year contract, at $50,000 per year. He was fired in September 1969.

=== NFL draft ===
In the 1965 NFL draft, the Giants had the first overall selection and took running back Tucker Frederickson; future hall of famers taken later in the first round were Joe Namath, Gale Sayers, and Dick Butkus.

== Regular season ==
During the offseason, the Giants traded for quarterback Earl Morrall. New York began with two wins in their first three games, and held a 4–4 mark before a two-game losing streak. They won three of their next four games before losing the regular season finale, their second game against the Cowboys.

Morrall started all 14 games for the Giants, throwing 22 touchdown passes and 12 interceptions. Tucker Frederickson topped the team with 659 yards rushing; he had six touchdowns, including five on the ground. Joe Morrison led the with 41 receptions, while Homer Jones had a team-high 709 receiving yards and six touchdown catches. Defensively, Spider Lockhart and Dick Lynch each had four interceptions, and Jim Katcavage had 5.5 sacks to lead New York. Frederickson and tackle Rosey Brown were selected for the 1966 Pro Bowl.

=== Schedule ===
Game	Date	Opponent	Result	Record	Venue	Attendance	Recap	Sources
1	September 19	at **Dallas Cowboys**	**L** 2–31	0–1	Cotton Bowl	59,366	Recap	
2	September 26	at **Philadelphia Eagles**	**W** 16–14	1–1	Franklin Field	57,154	Recap	
3	October 3	at **Pittsburgh Steelers**	**W** 23–13	2–1	Pitt Stadium	31,871	Recap	
4	October 9	at Minnesota Vikings	**L** 14–40	2–2	Metropolitan Stadium	44,283	Recap	
5	October 17	**Philadelphia Eagles**	**W** 35–27	3–2	Yankee Stadium	62,815	Recap	
6	October 24	**Cleveland Browns**	**L** 14–38	3–3	Yankee Stadium	62,864	Recap	
7	October 31	St. Louis Cardinals	**W** 14–10	4–3	Yankee Stadium	62,807	Recap	
8	November 7	**Washington Redskins**	**L** 7–23	4–4	Yankee Stadium	62,788	Recap	
9	November 14	at **Cleveland Browns**	**L** 21–34	4–5	Cleveland Municipal Stadium	82,426	Recap	
10	November 21	at St. Louis Cardinals	**W** 28–15	5–5	Busch Stadium	31,704	Recap	
11	November 28	Chicago Bears	**L** 14–35	5–6	Yankee Stadium	62,933	Recap	
12	December 5	**Pittsburgh Steelers**	**W** 35–10	6–6	Yankee Stadium	62,735	Recap	
13	December 12	at **Washington Redskins**	**W** 27–10	7–6	D. C. Stadium	50,373	Recap	
14	December 19	**Dallas Cowboys**	**L** 20–38	7–7	Yankee Stadium	62,871	Recap	
Note: Intra-conference opponents are in **bold** text.

== Standings ==
NFL Eastern Conference
	W	L	T	PCT	CONF	PF	PA	STK
Cleveland Browns	11	3	0	.786	11–1	363	325	W1
Dallas Cowboys	7	7	0	.500	6–6	325	280	W3
New York Giants	7	7	0	.500	7–5	270	338	L1
Washington Redskins	6	8	0	.429	6–6	257	301	W1
Philadelphia Eagles	5	9	0	.357	5–7	363	359	L1
St. Louis Cardinals	5	9	0	.357	5–7	296	309	L6
Pittsburgh Steelers	2	12	0	.143	2–10	202	397	L7

Note: Tie games were not officially counted in the standings until 1972.

NFL Western Conference
	W	L	T	PCT	CONF	PF	PA	STK
Green Bay Packers	10	3	1	.769	8–3–1	316	224	T1
Baltimore Colts	10	3	1	.769	8–3–1	389	284	W1
Chicago Bears	9	5	0	.643	7–5	409	275	L1
San Francisco 49ers	7	6	1	.538	6–5–1	421	402	T1
Minnesota Vikings	7	7	0	.500	5–7	383	403	W2
Detroit Lions	6	7	1	.462	4–7–1	257	295	W1
Los Angeles Rams	4	10	0	.286	2–10	269	328	L1

Note: Tie games were not officially counted in the standings until 1972.

== Roster ==
1965 New York Giants roster
Quarterbacks (QB): 11 Earl Morrall; 19 Gary Wood; Running backs (RB): 24 Tucker Frederickson; 23 Ernie Koy P; 29 Chuck Mercein; 33 Smith Reed; 27 Steve Thurlow; 30 Ernie Wheelwright; Wide receivers (WR): 45 Homer Jones; 40 Joe Morrison; 85 Del Shofner; Tight ends (TE): 89 Bobby Crespino; 88 Aaron Thomas	Offensive linemen (OL): 63 Bookie Bolin G; 79 Rosey Brown T; 65 Pete Case G; 74 Roger Davis G/T; 53 Greg Larson C; 71 Frank Lasky T; 70 John McDowell T; 55 Bob Scholtz C; 64 Mickey Walker G/C; Defensive linemen (DL): 73 Roger Anderson DT; 83 Glen Condren DE; 77 Rosey Davis DE; 75 Jim Katcavage DE; 51 Lou Slaby DT/MLB; 72 Andy Stynchula DE/K	Linebackers (LB): 60 Jim Carroll OLB; 86 Tom Costello OLB; 87 Jerry Hillebrand MLB; 52 Bill Swain OLB; Defensive backs (DB): 28 Henry Carr SS; 48 Clarence Childs CB/S; 43 Spider Lockhart CB/P; 22 Dick Lynch CB; 20 Jimmy Patton FS; 21 Allan Webb SS; 41 Willie Williams CB; Special teams (ST): 18 Bob Timberlake K	Practice squad: Dave Powless T; Reserve: 78 Roger LaLonde DT (IR); 76 John LoVetere DT (IR); -- Jim Moran DT (IR); 68 Dave O'Brien G (IR); 54 Olen Underwood LB (IR); Rookies in italics

== See also ==
- 1965 NFL season
