= Bill Anderson (American football, born 1936) =

American football player (1936–2017)

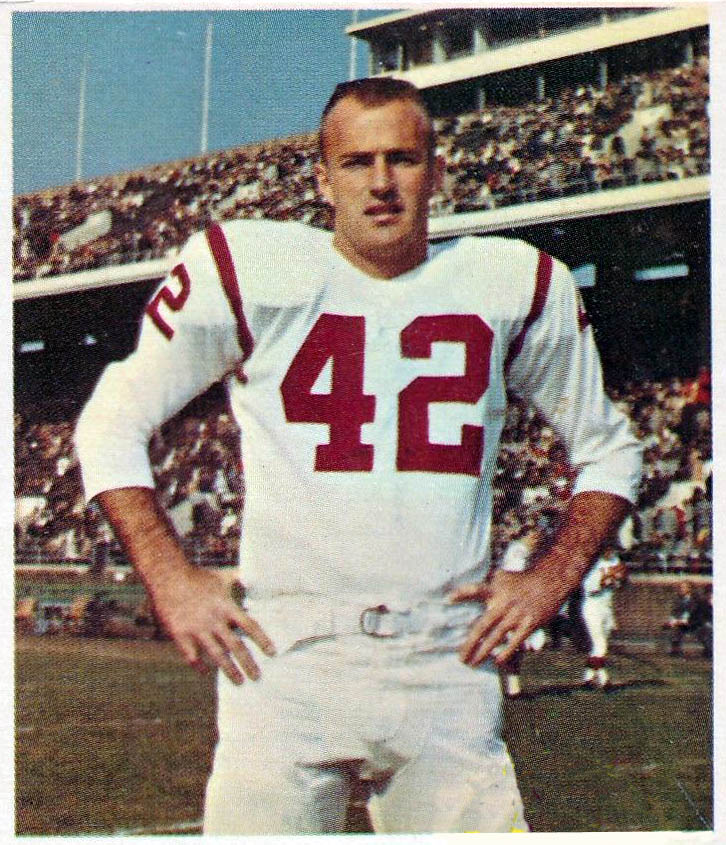
- Anderson on a Fleer football card of 1961

No. 42, 88
- Positions: End, tight end

Personal information
- Born: July 13, 1936; Hendersonville, North Carolina, U.S.
- Died: April 18, 2017 (aged 80); Knoxville, Tennessee, U.S.
- Listed height: 6 ft 3 in (1.91 m)
- Listed weight: 211 lb (96 kg)

Career information
- High school: Manatee (Bradenton, Florida)
- College: Tennessee
- NFL draft: 1958: 3rd round, 31st overall pick

Career history
- Washington Redskins (1958–1963); Green Bay Packers (1965–1966)

Awards and highlights
- Super Bowl champion (I); 2× NFL champion (1965, 1966); 2× Pro Bowl (1959, 1960)

Career NFL statistics
- Receptions: 178
- Receiving yards: 3,048
- Receiving touchdowns: 15
- Rushing yards: 11
- Stats at Pro Football Reference

Walter William Anderson (July 13, 1936 – April 18, 2017) was an American professional football tight end in the National Football League (NFL) for the Washington Redskins and Green Bay Packers. He played high school football at Manatee High School in Bradenton, Florida and college football at the University of Tennessee. He was selected in the third round of the 1958 NFL draft.

== College career ==
Anderson played for the Tennessee Volunteers from 1955 to 1957. He was a co-captain for the 1957 team.

== Professional career ==
=== Washington Redskins ===
Anderson played for the Redskins from 1958 to 1963. He was selected by the team as Rookie of the Year in 1958 and Player of the Year in 1959. Bill made 178 catches, averaging 17.1 yards per catch, and scored 14 touchdowns over six seasons. Anderson was a two-time Pro Bowl selection (1959 and 1960).

=== Green Bay Packers ===
Anderson retired from football in 1963 and joined the Tennessee staff as an assistant coach. However, he temporarily put his retirement plans on hold and signed with the Green Bay Packers in 1965. He played 24 games with Green Bay from 1965–1966 and averaged 11.9 yards per catch. The comeback was a good thing for him as the Packers won the 1965 and 1966 NFL Championships and he subsequently earned a Super Bowl ring when the Packers defeated the Kansas City Chiefs to win Super Bowl I on January 15, 1967.

=== NFL career statistics ===
Legend
| | Won the NFL championship |
| | Won the Super Bowl |
| **Bold** | Career high |

==== Regular season ====
| Year | Team | Games | | Receiving | | | | |
| Year | Team | GP | GS | Rec | Yds | Avg | Lng | TD |
|---|---|---|---|---|---|---|---|---|
| 1958 | WAS | 12 | 10 | 18 | 396 | **22.0** | **71** | 2 |
| 1959 | WAS | 11 | 11 | 35 | **734** | 21.0 | 70 | **6** |
| 1960 | WAS | 12 | 12 | 38 | 488 | 12.8 | 48 | 3 |
| 1961 | WAS | 14 | 11 | **40** | 637 | 15.9 | 42 | 0 |
| 1962 | WAS | 12 | 10 | 23 | 386 | 16.8 | 46 | 2 |
| 1963 | WAS | 13 | 6 | 14 | 288 | 20.6 | 49 | 1 |
| 1965 | GNB | 14 | 4 | 8 | 105 | 13.1 | 27 | 1 |
| 1966 | GNB | 10 | 1 | 2 | 14 | 7.0 | 8 | 0 |
| Career | | 98 | 65 | 178 | 3,048 | 17.1 | 71 | 15 |

==== Playoffs ====
| Year | Team | Games | | Receiving | | | | |
| Year | Team | GP | GS | Rec | Yds | Avg | Lng | TD |
|---|---|---|---|---|---|---|---|---|
| 1965 | GNB | 2 | 2 | **8** | **78** | **9.8** | **18** | 0 |
| 1966 | GNB | 2 | 0 | 0 | 0 | 0.0 | 0 | 0 |
| Career | | 4 | 2 | 8 | 78 | 9.8 | 18 | 0 |

== Broadcasting ==
In 1968, Anderson returned to Tennessee as color analyst for football games on the Vol Network, partnered with play-by-play announcer John Ward. Ward and Anderson would remain together for 31 years, the longest-running broadcast partnership in college football at the time. Their final game was the 1998 national championship game, the first game of the Bowl Championship Series, won by Tennessee over Florida State University.

== Family ==
Anderson is the second cousin of Giant Bomb staff member Brad Shoemaker.

== Death ==
Anderson died on April 18, 2017, at a hospital in Knoxville, Tennessee, at the age of 80.
