= 1966 Pro Bowl =

National Football League all-star game

1966 East–West Pro Bowl
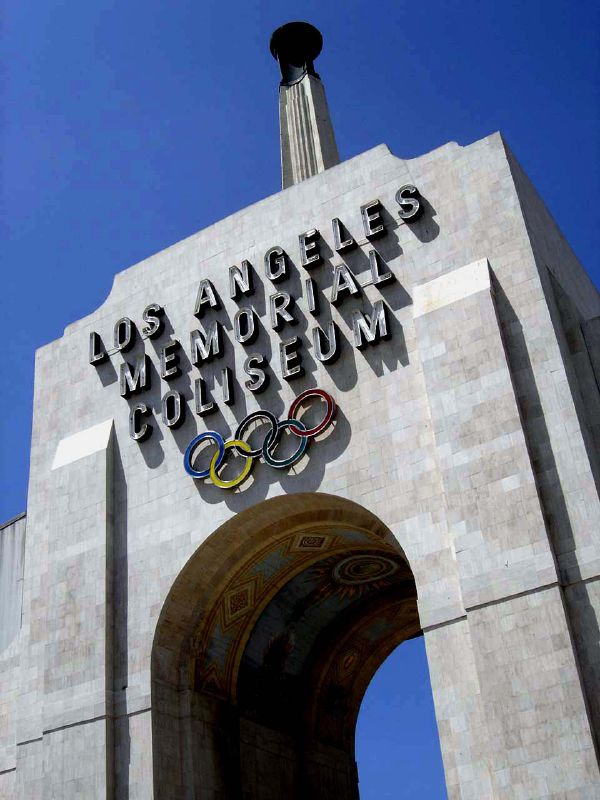
- The front of the L.A. Memorial Coliseum
Eastern Conference	Western Conference
36	7
Head coach: Blanton Collier (Cleveland Browns)	Head coach: Vince Lombardi (Green Bay Packers)
	1	2	3	4	Total
Eastern Conference	10	13	3	10	36
Western Conference	0	0	0	7	7
- Date: January 16, 1966
- Stadium: Los Angeles Memorial Coliseum; Los Angeles, California
- Co-MVPs: Jim Brown (Cleveland Browns, FB), Dale Meinert (St. Louis Cardinals, LB)
- Favorite: West by 7 points
- Attendance: 60,124

TV in the United States
- Network: CBS
- Announcers: Jack Drees, Frank Gifford

The 1966 Pro Bowl was the National Football League's sixteenth annual all-star game which featured the outstanding performers from the 1965 season. The game was played on January 16, 1966, at the Los Angeles Memorial Coliseum in Los Angeles, California, with an attendance of 60,124. The West was favored by a touchdown, but the East won in a rout, 36–7.

The Western Conference stars were led by Vince Lombardi, head coach of the league champion Green Bay Packers. The coach of the Eastern Conference, Blanton Collier of the Cleveland Browns, used the domination of the West that year as a rallying cry for the Eastern team as they prepared to take the field.

During the 1965 season, the Western Conference had dominated the Eastern Conference — Western teams were 13–1 in regular season inter-conference games and had won the league championship two weeks earlier, the third-place Playoff Bowl, and the previous two editions in this series. The domination extended to the college ranks as well, with the West team winning the Rose Bowl and the East–West Shrine Game (college all-star game).

At the same time, Lombardi felt his West squad was at an unfair disadvantage in the game due to a denial by the league of a last minute appeal to use his own team's quarterback, Bart Starr, in the game. Starr had previously been scratched due to injury, but had recovered sufficiently to play. In his place, San Francisco 49ers quarterback John Brodie threw a record six interceptions, offset with one touchdown pass late in the game to Tommy McDonald of the Los Angeles Rams to avoid a shutout.

Linebacker Dale Meinert of the St. Louis Cardinals was named the "lineman of the game" while the Cleveland Browns' fullback Jim Brown was awarded "back of the game" honors for the third time in his career. Brown carried 21 times for 65 yards, rushing for three touchdowns in the first half. One story line entering the game never materialized, the anticipated showdown between Brown and halfback Gale Sayers of the Chicago Bears, the season's consensus Rookie of the Year; Lombardi surprisingly called only a single play for Sayers, a handoff which gained fifteen yards.

This was Brown's final NFL game; he left at the top of his game (league MVP for third time in nine seasons) to pursue an acting career in Hollywood. A month shy of thirty years old, he had a year remaining (1966) on a three-year contract, estimated at $60,000 per year ($595,400 in 2025), and officially announced his retirement six months later in July from England, on the set of the 1967 film The Dirty Dozen.
