= Bud Marshall =

American football player (1941–2009)

No. 70, 75, 77
- Positions: Defensive tackle, Defensive end

Personal information
- Born: September 12, 1941; Carthage, Texas, U.S.
- Died: July 16, 2009 (aged 67); La Porte, Texas, U.S.
- Listed height: 6 ft 4 in (1.93 m)
- Listed weight: 270 lb (122 kg)

Career information
- High school: Carthage
- College: Baylor (1960–1961); Stephen F. Austin (1963–1964)
- NFL draft: 1965: 10th round, 136th overall pick
- AFL draft: 1965: Red Shirt 11th round, 84th overall pick

Career history
- Green Bay Packers (1965); Washington Redskins (1966); Atlanta Falcons (1966); Houston Oilers (1967–1968)

Awards and highlights
- NFL champion (1965)

Career NFL/AFL statistics
- Fumble recoveries: 1
- Sacks: 3.5
- Stats at Pro Football Reference

Richard Arlen "Bud" Marshall (September 12, 1941 – July 16, 2009) was an American football defensive lineman in the National Football League (NFL) for the Green Bay Packers, Atlanta Falcons, and Washington Redskins. He also played in the American Football League (AFL) for the Houston Oilers. Marshall played college football at Baylor University and Stephen F. Austin State University and was drafted 136th overall in the tenth round of the 1965 NFL draft.

Marshall died on July 16, 2009, five years to the day after suffering a hemorrhagic stroke.
