= Lane Howell =

American football player (born 1941)

No. 78, 79
- Positions: Offensive tackle, Defensive tackle

Personal information
- Born: July 28, 1941; Forndale, Louisiana, U.S.
- Died: January 16, 2018 (aged 76); Monroe, Louisiana, U.S.
- Listed height: 6 ft 5 in (1.96 m)
- Listed weight: 257 lb (117 kg)

Career information
- High school: Carroll (Monroe)
- College: Grambling State
- NFL draft: 1963: 15th round, 209th overall pick

Career history
- New York Giants (1963–1964); Philadelphia Eagles (1965–1969); Los Angeles Rams (1970)*
- * Offseason or practice squad member only

Career NFL statistics
- Games played: 91
- Games started: 62
- Fumble recoveries: 2
- Stats at Pro Football Reference

Autrey Lane Howell (July 28, 1941 - January 16, 2018) was an American former professional football player who was a defensive tackle for seven seasons in the National Football League (NFL). He played college football for the Grambling State Tigers. His NFL career started in 1963 for the New York Giants, where he played for two seasons after which played on the Philadelphia Eagles for another five seasons before retiring.

His brothers Mike Howell and Delles Howell also played in the NFL.
