= 1965 Philadelphia Eagles season =

NFL team season

- Owner: Jerry Wolman
- Head coach: Joe Kuharich
- Home stadium: Franklin Field

Results
- Record: 5–9
- Division place: 5th (tied) NFL Eastern
- Playoffs: Did not qualify
- Pro Bowlers: C Jim Ringo; LB Maxie Baughan; HB Timmy Brown; RT Bob Brown; TE Pete Retzlaff

The 1965 Philadelphia Eagles season was the franchise's thirty-third season in the National Football League.

The Philadelphia Eagles compiled a record of five wins to nine losses out of the fourteen games played. The team was led by Joe Kuharich with ownership duties belonging to Jerry Wolman. The Eagles began the season with a win against the St. Louis Cardinals followed by a loss to the New York Giants. After a win against the Dallas Cowboys, the Eagles lost four straight games, dropping the team from the playoff hunt. It ended the season in fifth place within the NFL Eastern Conference.

== Off season ==
=== NFL draft ===
The NFL and the American Football League (AFL) competed with each other for the same pool of college players each year. The 1965 NFL draft and the 1965 AFL draft both took place on Saturday, November 28, 1964. This was the day of the Army–Navy Game, which is normally the last game of the college season before the bowl games.

The two leagues' drafts were separate from each other; as a result, several players were drafted by both leagues. The AFL's representatives were aggressive in pursuing potential stars and did what they could to please the players who agreed to sign with the AFL. Joe Namath, who agreed to sign if he could play in New York, ultimately signed a three-year contract with the New York Jets that was worth $427,000. (Not all of this amount was for Namath himself. $120,000 went toward salaries for three of his relatives over that three-year period, as well as for lawyer's fees.)

As in earlier years, some players signed "AFL contracts" with the league itself as soon as their last college game was over; when they were drafted by an AFL team, those contracts were transferred from the league to their respective teams. To help fight this, the NFL moved its draft up to near the end of the college season, but this move was quickly matched by the AFL.

League representatives were assigned to various draft prospects to keep them away from the other league's recruiters. One of the Eagles' draft picks, Otis Taylor, was held in a motel and had to "escape" from his NFL advisor. He later signed with the AFL's Kansas City Chiefs for money and a "red Thunderbird convertible" that the AFL advisor had been driving.

The first player selected in the NFL draft was Tucker Frederickson, running back from Auburn, by the New York Giants. The draft was marked by the failure of the St. Louis Cardinals to sign Joe Namath, who instead signed with the AFL's New York Jets. He and the Jets went on to defeat the NFL's Baltimore Colts for the World Championship in Super Bowl III after the 1968 season.

=== Player selections ===
= Pro Bowler	= AFL All-Star	= Hall of Famer

Rd	PICK	PLAYER	POS	SCHOOL	AFL	Rd	Pick	Signed
1	7	^{Pick Traded to Green Bay Packers}						
2	20	Ray Rissmiller	Tackle	Georgia	Buffalo	8	64	Eagles
3	35	Al Nelson	Running back	Cincinnati	Buffalo	9	78	Eagles
4	48	Fred Hill	Wide receiver	USC	Oakland	16	123	Eagles
5	63	John Henderson	End	Michigan	Buffalo	17	136	Buffalo
6	76	John Huarte	Quarterback	Notre Dame	New York	2	12	Boston
6	77	Gary Garrison	Wide receiver	San Diego State				
7	91	Erwin Will	Tackle	Dayton				
8	104	Al Piraino	Tackle	Wisconsin	Kansas City	11	85	
9	119	Floyd Hudlow	Back	Arizona	Buffalo	10	80	
10	132	Rick Redman	Center	Washington	San Diego	5	38	Eagles
11	147	Louis James	Running back	Texas-El Paso				
12	161	John Kuznieski	Running back	Purdue				
13	175	John Fouse	End	Arizona	Buffalo	17	129	
14	188	Tom Longo	Back	Notre Dame				
15	203	Otis Taylor	Wide receiver	Prairie View A&M	Kansas City	4	29	Kansas City
16	216	Jim Gray	Back	Toledo	New York	11	84	Jets
17	231	Dave Austin	End	Georgia Tech				
18	244	Bill Marcordes	End	Bradley				
19	259	Charley Englehart	Tackle	John Carroll				
20	272	Bobby Shann	End	Boston College				

== Regular season ==
=== Schedule ===
Week	Date	Opponent	Result	Record	Venue	Attendance
1	September 19	**St. Louis Cardinals**	**W** 34–27	1–0	Franklin Field	54,260
2	September 26	**New York Giants**	**L** 14–16	1–1	Franklin Field	57,154
3	October 3	**Cleveland Browns**	**L** 17–35	1–2	Franklin Field	60,759
4	October 10	at **Dallas Cowboys**	**W** 35–24	2–2	Cotton Bowl	56,249
5	October 17	at **New York Giants**	**L** 27–35	2–3	Yankee Stadium	62,815
6	October 24	**Pittsburgh Steelers**	**L** 14–20	2–4	Franklin Field	56,515
7	October 31	at **Washington Redskins**	**L** 21–23	2–5	D.C. Stadium	50,301
8	November 7	at **Cleveland Browns**	**L** 34–38	2–6	Cleveland Municipal Stadium	72,807
9	November 14	**Washington Redskins**	**W** 21–14	3–6	Franklin Field	60,444
10	November 21	at Baltimore Colts	**L** 24–34	3–7	Memorial Stadium	60,238
11	November 28	at **St. Louis Cardinals**	**W** 28–24	4–7	Busch Memorial Stadium	28,706
12	December 5	**Dallas Cowboys**	**L** 19–21	4–8	Franklin Field	54,714
13	December 12	at **Pittsburgh Steelers**	**W** 47–13	5–8	Pitt Stadium	22,002
14	December 19	Detroit Lions	**L** 28–35	5–9	Franklin Field	56,718

Conference opponents are in bold text.

== Standings ==
NFL Eastern Conference
	W	L	T	PCT	CONF	PF	PA	STK
Cleveland Browns	11	3	0	.786	11–1	363	325	W1
Dallas Cowboys	7	7	0	.500	6–6	325	280	W3
New York Giants	7	7	0	.500	7–5	270	338	L1
Washington Redskins	6	8	0	.429	6–6	257	301	W1
Philadelphia Eagles	5	9	0	.357	5–7	363	359	L1
St. Louis Cardinals	5	9	0	.357	5–7	296	309	L6
Pittsburgh Steelers	2	12	0	.143	2–10	202	397	L7

Note: Tie games were not officially counted in the standings until 1972.

== Personnel ==
=== Staff / Coaches ===
1965 Philadelphia Eagles staff
Front office: Principal / Majority Owner – Jerry Wolman; General manager – Joe Kuharich (de facto); Head coaches: Head coach - Joe Kuharich; Offensive coaches: Offensive Coordinator / Receivers - Herman Ball; Offensive Assistant - Mike Nixon; Offensive Line – Dick Stanfel	Defensive coaches: Defensive Coordinator - Dick Evans; Defensive Backs / Secondary – Fred Bruney

=== Roster ===
= 1965 Pro Bowl	= Hall of Famer

NO.	Player	AGE	POS	GP	GS	WT	HT	YRS	College
	Joe Kuharich		COACH						Notre Dame
38	Sam Baker	36	K-FB	12	0	217	6–2	12	Oregon State
55	Maxie Baughan*	27	LB	12	12	227	6–2	5	Georgia Tech
64	Ed Blaine	25	G	14	14	240	6–1	3	Missouri
76	Bob Brown*+	24	T	14	14	280	6–4	1	Nebraska
22	Timmy Brown*	28	RB	13	0	198	5–11	6	Ball State
3	Jack Concannon	22	QB	3	0	205	6–3	1	Boston College
23	Claude Crabb	25	DB-WR	10	0	192	6–1	3	Colorado and USC
87	Bill Cronin	22	TE	2	0	231	6–5	Rookie	Boston College
27	Irv Cross*	26	DB	14	0	195	6–2	4	Northwestern
32	Roger Gill	25	WR-HB	13	0	200	6–1	1	Texas Tech
49	Glenn Glass	25	DB-WR	12	0	205	6–1	3	Tennessee
81	Ron Goodwin	24	FL-SE-WR	11	0	180	5–11	2	Baylor
78	Dave Graham	26	T	14	0	250	6–3	2	Virginia
34	Earl Gros	25	FB	14	0	220	6–3	3	LSU
43	Ralph Heck	24	LB	12	0	230	6–1	2	Colorado
86	Fred Hill	22	TE-SE-WR	12	0	215	6–2	Rookie	USC
10	King Hill	29	QB	7	5	212	6–3	7	Rice
79	Lane Howell	24	T-DT	14	0	257	6–5	2	Grambling
63	Lynn Hoyem	26	G-T	14	0	244	6–4	3	Long Beach State
83	Don Hultz	25	DE-DT	14	0	241	6–3	2	Southern Miss
84	Jim Kelly	23	TE	1	0	218	6–2	1	Notre Dame
73	Ed Khayat	30	DT-DE-T	14	5	240	6–3	8	Tulane
29	Izzy Lang	23	RB	14	0	232	6–1	1	Tennessee State
52	Dave Lloyd	29	LB-C	13	13	247	6–3	6	Georgia, Texas Tech
33	Ollie Matson	35	RB-FL	14	0	220	6–2	13	San Francisco
75	John Meyers	25	DT	14	14	276	6–6	3	Washington
89	Mike Morgan	23	LB	14	14	242	6–4	1	LSU
26	Al Nelson	22	DB	14	14	186	5–11	Rookie	Cincinnati
9	Jim Nettles	23	DB	14	0	177	5–10	Rookie	Wisconsin
72	Floyd Peters	29	DT	9	9	254	6–4	6	San Francisco State
35	Ray Poage	25	TE-SE-FL-WR	13	0	208	6–4	2	Texas
24	Nate Ramsey	24	DB	14	14	200	6–1	2	Indiana State
51	Dave Recher	23	C	14	0	245	6–1	Rookie	Iowa
44	Pete Retzlaff*+	34	E-HB-TE	14	0	211	6–1	Rookie	South Dakota State
68	Bobby Richards	27	DE-DT	14	12	245	6–2	3	LSU
54	Jim Ringo*	34	C	14	14	232	6–1	12	Syracuse
21	Joe Scarpati	22	DB	14	0	185	5–10	1	North Carolina State Wolfpack
25	Bob Shann	22	DB	4	0	189	6–1	Rookie	Boston College
70	Jim Skaggs	25	G-T	14	14	250	6–3	2	Washington
16	Norm Snead*	26	QB	11	9	215	6–4	4	Wake Forest
82	George Tarasovic	35	DE-LB-C	14	0	245	6–4	13	Boston College, LSU
53	Harold Wells	27	LB	14	0	220	6–2	Rookie	Purdue
67	Erwin Will	22	DT	5	0	275	6–5	Rookie	Dayton
37	Tom Woodeshick	24	RB	13	0	225	6–0	2	West Virginia

== Awards and honors ==
- Pete Retzlaff, Bert Bell Award
