= Mike Melinkovich =

American football player (born 1942)

No. 82, 83
- Position: Defensive end

Personal information
- Born: January 7, 1942 (age 84); Tonasket, Washington, U.S.
- Listed height: 6 ft 4 in (1.93 m)
- Listed weight: 245 lb (111 kg)

Career information
- High school: Aberdeen (WA) J.M. Weatherwax
- College: Washington
- NFL draft: 1965: 17th round, 236th overall pick

Career history
- St. Louis Cardinals (1965–1966); Detroit Lions (1967)
- Stats at Pro Football Reference

Mike Melinkovich (born January 7, 1942) is an American former professional football player who was a defensive end in the National Football League (NFL). He played college football for the Washington Huskies. He played in the NFL for the St. Louis Cardinals from 1965 to 1966 and for the Detroit Lions in 1967.
