= 1965 St. Louis Cardinals (NFL) season =

American football team season

1965 St. Louis Cardinals season
- Head coach: Wally Lemm
- Home stadium: Busch Stadium

Results
- Record: 5–9
- Division place: 5th (tied) NFL Eastern
- Playoffs: Did not qualify

The 1965 St. Louis Cardinals season was the team's 46th year in the National Football League (NFL) and their sixth season in St. Louis. After losing the season opener in Philadelphia, the Cardinals reeled off four consecutive wins to move into a tie with the Cleveland Browns at 4–1 after five weeks. However, the Cardinals lost their final six games to finish in sixth place at 5–9, ahead of only the 2–12 Pittsburgh Steelers in the NFL Eastern Conference.

It was the final season at Busch Stadium, formerly known as Sportsman's Park. Head coach Wally Lemm resigned after the 1965 season and returned to his previous position with the Houston Oilers of the AFL. The Cardinals moved to the new Busch Memorial Stadium for the 1966 season.

== Offseason ==
=== NFL draft ===
In November 1964, the Cardinals selected quarterback Joe Namath of Alabama in the first round of the 1965 NFL draft, but he signed a record contract with the New York Jets of the American Football League. It was the height of the bidding war between the leagues, which subsided with the merger announcement in June 1966.

== Regular season ==
=== Schedule ===
Week	Date	Opponent	Result	Record	Venue	Attendance
1	September 19	at **Philadelphia Eagles**	**L** 27–34	0–1	Franklin Field	54,260
2	September 26	at **Cleveland Browns**	**W** 49–13	1–1	Cleveland Municipal Stadium	80,161
3	October 4	**Dallas Cowboys**	**W** 20–13	2–1	Busch Stadium	32,034
4	October 10	at **Washington Redskins**	**W** 37–16	3–1	D.C. Stadium	50,205
5	October 17	at **Pittsburgh Steelers**	**W** 20–7	4–1	Pitt Stadium	31,085
6	October 24	**Washington Redskins**	**L** 20–24	4–2	Busch Stadium	32,228
7	October 31	at **New York Giants**	**L** 10–14	4–3	Yankee Stadium	62,807
8	November 7	**Pittsburgh Steelers**	**W** 21–17	5–3	Busch Stadium	31,899
9	November 14	at Chicago Bears	**L** 13–34	5–4	Wrigley Field	45,663
10	November 21	**New York Giants**	**L** 15–28	5–5	Busch Stadium	31,704
11	November 28	**Philadelphia Eagles**	**L** 24–28	5–6	Busch Stadium	28,706
12	December 5	Los Angeles Rams	**L** 3–27	5–7	Busch Stadium	27,943
13	December 11	at **Dallas Cowboys**	**L** 13–27	5–8	Cotton Bowl	38,499
14	December 19	**Cleveland Browns**	**L** 24–27	5–9	Busch Stadium	29,348
Note: Intra-conference opponents are in **bold** text.

== Standings ==
NFL Eastern Conference
	W	L	T	PCT	CONF	PF	PA	STK
Cleveland Browns	11	3	0	.786	11–1	363	325	W1
Dallas Cowboys	7	7	0	.500	6–6	325	280	W3
New York Giants	7	7	0	.500	7–5	270	338	L1
Washington Redskins	6	8	0	.429	6–6	257	301	W1
Philadelphia Eagles	5	9	0	.357	5–7	363	359	L1
St. Louis Cardinals	5	9	0	.357	5–7	296	309	L6
Pittsburgh Steelers	2	12	0	.143	2–10	202	397	L7

Note: Tie games were not officially counted in the standings until 1972.

== Personnel ==
=== Staff / Coaches ===
1965 St. Louis Cardinals staff
Front office: Principal Owner/de facto General Manager - Bill Bidwill; Partial Owner / Team President - Charles Bidwill Jr.; Head coaches: Head Coach – Wally Lemm; Assistant Coach / Talent Scout - Abe Stuber; Offensive coaches: Offensive Backs / Game Scouting - Charley Trippi; Offensive line – Ray Prochaska; Receivers Coach – Fran Polsfoot	Defensive coaches: Defensive Coordinator - Chuck Drulis

=== Roster ===
1965 St. Louis Cardinals roster
Quarterbacks (QB): 11 Buddy Humphrey; 14 Terry Nofsinger; Running backs (RB): 33 Willis Crenshaw; 36 Bill Thornton; 38 Bill Triplett; Wide receivers (WR): 40 Bobby Joe Conrad; 3 Billy Gambrell; 28 Ray Ogden; 88 Sonny Randle; Tight ends (TE): 33 Mal Hammack; 83 Chuck Logan; 81 Jackie Smith	Offensive linemen (OL): 50 Mike Alford C; 75 Ed Cook G; 61 Bob DeMarco C; 55 Irv Goode G/T; 64 Ken Gray G; 73 Ernie McMillan T; 69 Ed McQuarters T; 71 Bob Reynolds T; 66 Rick Sortun G; Defensive linemen (DL): 86 Don Brumm DE; 82 Mike Melinkovich DE; 78 Luke Owens DT; 84 Joe Robb DE; 72 Sam Silas DT; 79 Chuck Walker DT	Linebackers (LB): 34 Bill Koman OLB; 60 Dave Meggyesy OLB; 62 Dale Meinert MLB; 52 Marion Rushing OLB; 53 Dave Simmons MLB; 67 Larry Stallings OLB; Defensive backs (DB): 20 Monk Bailey SS; 49 Jimmy Burson CB; 37 Pat Fischer CB; 45 Carl Silvestri FS; 8 Larry Wilson FS; 42 Abe Woodson CB; Special teams (ST): 25 Jim Bakken K	Practice squad: Richard Hard DE; Frank Roy G; Reserve: 35 Joe Childress RB (IR); 22 Prentice Gautt RB (IR); 12 Charley Johnson QB (IR); 65 Tom Redmond DE (IR); 21 Jerry Stovall S (IR); 63 Herschel Turner T (IR); Rookies in italics
