= 1965 Dallas Cowboys season =

NFL team season

- Owner: Clint Murchison, Jr.
- General manager: Tex Schramm
- Head coach: Tom Landry
- Home stadium: Cotton Bowl

Results
- Record: 7–7
- Division place: 2nd NFL Eastern (tie)
- Playoffs: Lost NFL Playoff Bowl (vs. Colts) 3–35

The 1965 Dallas Cowboys season was their sixth in the National Football League and their best record to date, at 7–7. After five consecutive losses, Dallas was 2–5 halfway through the season. They won five of the final seven games and finished in a tie for second place in the Eastern Conference, with the New York Giants, four games behind the defending NFL champion Cleveland Browns (11–3).

The Cowboys defeated the Giants twice and earned the berth in the third place Playoff Bowl in Miami, held three weeks after the regular season, but lost 35–3 to the Baltimore Colts, runners-up of the Western Conference.

== Offseason ==
=== NFL draft ===
1965 Dallas Cowboys draft
Round	Pick	Player	Position	College	Notes
1	5	Craig Morton	QB	California	
2	19	Malcolm Walker	C	Rice	
4	47	Jimmy Sidle	RB	Auburn	
4	53	Bob Svihus	OT	USC	Signed with the AFL
5	61	Roger Pettee	LB	Florida	
6	75	Sonny Utz	RB	Virginia Tech	He spent 2 seasons on the injured reserve list
7	89	Brig Owens	S	Cincinnati	
8	103	Russell Wayt	LB	Rice	
9	117	Jim Zanios	RB	Texas Tech	
10	131	Gaylon McCullough	C	Alabama	
11	145	Jethro Pugh	DT	Elizabeth City State	
12	159	Ernie Kellermann *	S	Miami (OH)	
13	173	Jack Schraub	E	California	
14	187	Garry Porterfield	DE	Tulsa	
15	201	Gene Foster	FB	Arizona State	Signed with the AFL
16	215	Doug McDougal	E	Oregon State	
17	229	Mitch Johnson	OT	UCLA	
18	243	Marty Amsler	OT	Evansville	
19	257	Merv Rettenmund	RB	Ball State	Signed with the Baltimore Orioles of the MLB
20	271	Don Barlow	OT	Kansas State	
Made roster † Pro Football Hall of Fame * Made at least one Pro Bowl during career

=== Undrafted free agents ===
1965 undrafted free agents of note
Player	Position	College
Obert Logan	Safety	Trinity (TX)
Colin Ridgway	Punter	Lamar
A. D. Whitfield	Running back	North Texas State

== Roster ==
Dallas Cowboys 1965 roster
Quarterbacks: 17 Don Meredith; 14 Craig Morton; 13 Jerry Rhome; Running backs: 37 Perry Lee Dunn; 43 Don Perkins; 30 Dan Reeves; 24 J. D. Smith; 42 A. D. Whitfield; Wide receivers: 26 Buddy Dial; 35 Pete Gent; 22 Bob Hayes; Tight ends: 82 Frank Clarke; 84 Pettis Norman	Offensive linemen: 68 Jim Boeke T; 53 Mike Connelly C/G; 62 Leon Donohue G; 64 Mitch Johnson G/T; 67 Jake Kupp G; 51 Dave Manders C; 73 Ralph Neely T; 71 Don Talbert T; Defensive linemen: 66 George Andrie DE; 77 Jim Colvin DT; 74 Bob Lilly DT; 75 Jethro Pugh DT/DE; 79 Larry Stephens DE/DT; 78 Maury Youmans DE	Linebackers: 52 Dave Edwards OLB; 56 Harold Hays OLB; 54 Chuck Howley OLB; 55 Lee Roy Jordan MLB; 50 Jerry Tubbs MLB; Defensive backs: 44 Don Bishop CB; 27 Mike Gaechter SS; 34 Cornell Green CB; 41 Warren Livingston CB; 25 Obert Logan SS; 20 Mel Renfro FS; Special teams: 88 Colin Ridgway P; 11 Danny Villanueva K/P	Taxi squad: -- Brig Owens S; 33 Russell Wayt LB; Reserve lists: 60 Joe Isbell G (IR); 72 Tony Liscio T (IR); -- Roger Pettee LB (IR); 70 Bill Sandeman DT (IR); 23 Jimmy Sidle RB (IR); 57 Malcolm Walker C/G/T (IR); Rookies in italics 40 active, 8 inactive

== Schedule ==
Week	Date	Opponent	Result	Record	Game Site	Attendance	Recap
1	September 19	**New York Giants**	**W** 31–2	1–0	Cotton Bowl	59,366	Recap
2	September 26	**Washington Redskins**	**W** 27–7	2–0	Cotton Bowl	61,577	Recap
3	October 4	at **St. Louis Cardinals**	**L** 13–20	2–1	Busch Stadium	32,034	Recap
4	October 10	**Philadelphia Eagles**	**L** 24–35	2–2	Cotton Bowl	56,249	Recap
5	October 17	at **Cleveland Browns**	**L** 17–23	2–3	Cleveland Stadium	80,451	Recap
6	October 24	at Green Bay Packers	**L** 3–13	2–4	Milwaukee County Stadium	48,311	Recap
7	October 31	at **Pittsburgh Steelers**	**L** 13–22	2–5	Pitt Stadium	37,804	Recap
8	November 7	San Francisco 49ers	**W** 39–31	3–5	Cotton Bowl	39,677	Recap
9	November 14	**Pittsburgh Steelers**	**W** 24–17	4–5	Cotton Bowl	57,293	Recap
10	November 21	**Cleveland Browns**	**L** 17–24	4–6	Cotton Bowl	76,251	Recap
11	November 28	at **Washington Redskins**	**L** 31–34	4–7	D.C. Stadium	50,205	Recap
12	December 5	at **Philadelphia Eagles**	**W** 21–19	5–7	Franklin Field	54,714	Recap
13	December 11	**St. Louis Cardinals**	**W** 27–13	6–7	Cotton Bowl	38,499	Recap
14	December 19	at **New York Giants**	**W** 38–20	7–7	Yankee Stadium	62,871	Recap

Conference opponents are in bold text

== Postseason ==
Round	Date	Opponent	Result	Game Site	Attendance
Playoff Bowl	January 9, 1966	vs Baltimore Colts	L 3–35	Orange Bowl	65,569

== Standings ==
NFL Eastern Conference
	W	L	T	PCT	CONF	PF	PA	STK
Cleveland Browns	11	3	0	.786	11–1	363	325	W1
Dallas Cowboys	7	7	0	.500	6–6	325	280	W3
New York Giants	7	7	0	.500	7–5	270	338	L1
Washington Redskins	6	8	0	.429	6–6	257	301	W1
Philadelphia Eagles	5	9	0	.357	5–7	363	359	L1
St. Louis Cardinals	5	9	0	.357	5–7	296	309	L6
Pittsburgh Steelers	2	12	0	.143	2–10	202	397	L7

Note: Tie games were not officially counted in the standings until 1972.
