= 1965 Cleveland Browns season =

NFL team season

- General manager: Harold Sauerbrei
- Head coach: Blanton Collier
- Home stadium: Cleveland Stadium

Results
- Record: 11–3
- Division place: 1st NFL Eastern
- Playoffs: Lost NFL Championship (at Packers) 12–23
- Pro Bowlers: Paul Wiggin, DE; Gene Hickerson, G Frank Ryan, QB; John Wooten, G Jim Houston, LB; Gary Collins, FL; Dick Schafrath, LT; Jim Brown, FB

The 1965 Cleveland Browns season was the team's 16th season with the National Football League. With an NFL-best 11–3 mark, the 1965 team finished just a shade better than the year before (10–3–1) and, just as they had in 1964, the Browns returned to the NFL Championship Game; however, this time, they lost 23–12 to the Green Bay Packers in the last title contest held before the advent of the Super Bowl. It would be the first of three straight NFL crowns for the Packers, who went on to win the first two Super Bowls as well.

With his partner at wide receiver, 1964 rookie sensation Paul Warfield, missing almost all of the season with a broken collarbone, Gary Collins stepped up and led the Browns with 10 touchdown receptions, just less than half of the team's total of 23.

Pro Football Hall of Fame running back Jim Brown, in what would turn out to be his final year before his unexpected retirement in the offseason, rushed for 1,544 yards, 98 more than the year before, and exceeded his TD total by 10, scoring 17 times. Quarterback Frank Ryan, who had thrown 25 TD passes in both 1963 and 1964, had just 18 in 1965 with 13 interceptions. His yardage was down considerably, too, to 1,751, as was his rating (75.3).

The Browns had a stretch in which they won nine of ten games, something the 1964 team did not come close to matching. And whereas the 1964 team needed to capture its regular-season finale to clinch the Eastern Conference title, the 1965 Browns claimed the championship with several weeks left, which explains why they were clobbered 42–7 in the next-to-last game by a Los Angeles Rams team that finished last in the Western Conference at 4–10; The Browns rested many of their starters and were just trying to get out of that game with no injuries.

Thus, the Browns could have very easily been 12–2. However, there was no such explanation for the Browns' only other one-sided loss, a 49–13 home decision to the St. Louis Cardinals. Although the Cards finished tied with the Philadelphia Eagles for next-to-last place in the East at 5–9, they were arguably the Browns' fiercest rival throughout the entire 1960s.

== Offseason ==
=== NFL draft ===
1965 Cleveland Browns draft
Round	Selection	Player	Position	College	Notes
2	17	Jim Garcia	Tackle	Purdue	
2	22	Gerry Bussell	Defensive back	Georgia Tech	
2	27	Walter Johnson	Defensive tackle	Cal State-Los Angeles	
3	32	Bo Scott	Running back	Ohio State	
3	41	Bobby Maples	Linebacker	Baylor	
5	69	Bill Irwin	Tackle	Mississippi	
6	72	Arnie Simkus	Tackle	Michigan	
6	83	Corwyn Aldredge	Wide receiver	Northwestern State (LA)	
7	97	Dale Lindsey	Linebacker	Western Kentucky	
8	111	Mike Howell	Defensive back	Grambling	
9	125	Gary Lane	Quarterback	Missouri	
10	139	Pat Screen	Quarterback	LSU	
11	153	Ollie Cordill	Back	Memphis State	
12	167	Justin Canale	Guard	Mississippi State	
13	181	Henry Pickett	Back	Baylor	
14	195	Dan Simrell	Quarterback	Toledo	
15	209	Larry Gagner	Tackle	Florida	
16	223	Mel Anthony	Fullback	Michigan	
17	237	John Boyette	Tackle	Clemson	
18	251	Dick Arrington	Guard	Notre Dame	
19	265	Ed Orazen	Guard	Ohio State	
20	279	Frank Goldberg	Linebacker	Central Michigan	

== Exhibition schedule ==
Week	Date	Opponent	Result	Score	Record	Stadium	Attendance	Time	Network	Local TV	Radio
1	August 6, 1965 (Fri)	vs. College All-Stars (at Chicago)	W	24–16	1–0	Soldier Field	68,000	9:00 PM EDT	ABC		WJMO-AM
2	August 15, 1965	at San Francisco 49ers	W	37–21	2–0	Kezar Stadium	22,000	4:00 PM EDT		WEWS-TV	WJMO-AM
3	August 22, 1965	at Los Angeles Rams	W	21–19	3–0	Los Angeles Memorial Coliseum	29,508	4:00 PM EDT		WEWS-TV	WJMO-AM
4	August 29, 1965	at Detroit Lions	W	28–14	4–0	Tiger Stadium	28,803	1:30 PM EDT		WEWS-TV	WJMO-AM
5	September 4, 1965 (Sat)	Green Bay Packers	L	14–30	4–1	Cleveland Municipal Stadium	83,118	9:00 PM EDT			WJMO-AM
6	September 11, 1965 (Sat)	vs. Pittsburgh Steelers at (Akron)	W	28–16	5–1	Rubber Bowl	23,162	8:00 PM EDT			WERE-AM

Notes:

^{a} All times in North American Eastern Time.

There was a doubleheader on September 4, 1965, Giants vs Lions and Packers vs Browns.

== Schedule ==
Week	Date	Opponent	Result	Score	Record	Stadium	Attendance	Time	Network	Radio
1	September 19, 1965	at Washington Redskins	W	17–7	1–0	District of Columbia Stadium	48,208	1:30 PM EDT	CBS	WJMO-AM
2	September 26, 1965	St. Louis Cardinals	L	13–49	1–1	Cleveland Stadium	80,161	1:30 PM EDT	CBS	WJMO-AM
3	October 3, 1965	at Philadelphia Eagles	W	35–17	2–1	Franklin Field	60,759	1:30 PM EDT	CBS	WJMO-AM
4	October 9, 1965	Pittsburgh Steelers	W	24–19	3–1	Cleveland Stadium	80,187	8:00 PM EDT	Sports Network Incorporated (SNI)	WERE-AM
5	October 17, 1965	Dallas Cowboys	W	23–17	4–1	Cleveland Stadium	80,432	1:30 PM EDT	CBS	WERE-AM
6	October 24, 1965	at New York Giants	W	38–14	5–1	Yankee Stadium (I)	62,864	1:30 PM EST	CBS	WERE-AM
7	October 31, 1965	Minnesota Vikings	L	17–27	5–2	Cleveland Stadium	83,505	1:30 PM EST	CBS	WERE-AM
8	November 7, 1965	Philadelphia Eagles	W	38–34	6–2	Cleveland Stadium	72,807	1:30 PM EST	CBS	WERE-AM
9	November 14, 1965	New York Giants	W	34–21	7–2	Cleveland Stadium	82,426	1:30 PM EST	CBS	WERE-AM
10	November 21, 1965	at Dallas Cowboys	W	24–17	8–2	Cotton Bowl	76,251	4:00 PM EST	CBS	WERE-AM
11	November 28, 1965	at Pittsburgh Steelers	W	42–21	9–2	Pitt Stadium	42,757	1:30 PM EST	CBS	WERE-AM
12	December 5, 1965	Washington Redskins	W	24–16	10–2	Cleveland Stadium	77,765	1:30 PM EST	CBS	WERE-AM
13	December 12, 1965	at Los Angeles Rams	L	7–42	10–3	Los Angeles Memorial Coliseum	49,048	4:00 PM EST	CBS	WERE-AM
14	December 19, 1965	at St. Louis Cardinals	W	27–24	11–3	Busch Stadium I	29,348	2:00 PM EST	CBS	WERE-AM

Notes:

^{a} All times in North American Eastern Time. (UTC–4 and UTC–5 starting October 24)

== Playoffs ==
Round	Date	Opponent	Result	Score	Stadium	Attendance	Time	Network	Local Radio	National Radio
1965 NFL Championship Game	January 2, 1966	at Green Bay Packers	L	12–23	Lambeau Field	50,852	2:00 PM EST	CBS	WERE-AM	CBS

Notes:

^{a} All times in North American Eastern Time.

== Personnel ==
=== Roster ===
1965 Cleveland Browns roster
Quarterbacks: 11 Jim Ninowski; 13 Frank Ryan; Running backs: 32 Jim Brown; 36 Charley Scales; 44 Leroy Kelly; 48 Ernie Green; Wide receivers: 27 Walter Roberts; 42 Paul Warfield; 85 Clifton McNeil; 86 Gary Collins P; 87 Tom Hutchinson; Tight ends: 41 Ralph Smith; 83 Johnny Brewer	Offensive linemen: 56 John Morrow C; 60 John Wooten G; 62 Dale Memmelaar G/C; 66 Gene Hickerson G; 70 John Brown T; 73 Monte Clark T; 77 Dick Schafrath T; Defensive linemen: 69 Jim Kanicki DT; 71 Walter Johnson DT; 74 Dick Modzelewski DT; 80 Bill Glass DE; 81 Jim Garcia DE; 84 Paul Wiggin DE	Linebackers: 35 Galen Fiss OLB; 38 Stan Sczurek OLB; 50 Vince Costello MLB; 51 Dale Lindsey MLB; 67 Sid Williams OLB; 82 Jim Houston OLB; Defensive backs: 20 Ross Fichtner SS; 23 Larry Benz FS; 24 Bobby Franklin CB/S; 30 Bernie Parrish CB; 34 Mike Howell CB/S; 40 Erich Barnes CB; 49 Walter Beach CB; Special teams: 76 Lou Groza K	Taxi squad: -- Bill Byrne G; 37 Jamie Caleb RB; -- Ernie Kellermann S; -- David Lee P; -- Archie Roberts QB; Reserve list: 78 Frank Parker DT (IR); rookies in italics

=== Staff/coaches ===
1965 Cleveland Browns staff
Front office: Majority owner/CEO & president – Art Modell; Minority owner – Al Lerner; General manager – Harold Sauerbrei; Coaches: Head coach – Blanton Collier; Offensive coaches: Quarterbacks/Running Backs/Tight Ends - Dub Jones; Offensive line – Fritz Heisler; Offensive backfield and ends – Paul Bixler	Defensive coaches: Defensive line – Nick Skorich; Linebackers – Ed Ulinski; Strength & Conditioning: Athletic Trainer - Leo Murphy; Equipment Manager - Morris Kono

== Standings ==
NFL Eastern Conference
	W	L	T	PCT	CONF	PF	PA	STK
Cleveland Browns	11	3	0	.786	11–1	363	325	W1
Dallas Cowboys	7	7	0	.500	6–6	325	280	W3
New York Giants	7	7	0	.500	7–5	270	338	L1
Washington Redskins	6	8	0	.429	6–6	257	301	W1
Philadelphia Eagles	5	9	0	.357	5–7	363	359	L1
St. Louis Cardinals	5	9	0	.357	5–7	296	309	L6
Pittsburgh Steelers	2	12	0	.143	2–10	202	397	L7

Note: Tie games were not officially counted in the standings until 1972.

== See also ==
- The Fortune Cookie – scenes were filmed during the 27–17 loss to the Vikings on October 31.
