= A. D. Whitfield =

American football player (born 1943)

A.D. Whitfield
No. 42, 25
- Position: Running back

Personal information
- Born: September 2, 1943; Rosebud, Texas, U.S.
- Died: September 1, 2022 (aged 78)
- Listed height: 5 ft 10 in (1.78 m)
- Listed weight: 200 lb (91 kg)

Career information
- High school: Wilson White (TX)
- College: North Texas (1961-1964)
- NFL draft: 1965: undrafted

Career history
- Dallas Cowboys (1965); Washington Redskins (1966–1969); BC Lions (1970); Denver Broncos (1971); Florida Blazers (1974)

Awards and highlights
- 2× Honorable-mention All-MVC (1962, 1964); All-MVC (1963)

Career NFL statistics
- Rushing yards: 981
- Rushing average: 4.4
- Receptions: 67
- Receiving yards: 702
- Total touchdowns: 6
- Stats at Pro Football Reference

A. D. Whitfield, Jr. (September 2, 1943 - September 1, 2022) was an American former professional football player who was a running back in the National Football League (NFL) for the Dallas Cowboys and Washington Redskins. He played college football for the North Texas Mean Green.

== Early life ==
Whitfield attended Wilson White High School, where he started playing high school football as a sophomore. He moved on to North Texas State University where he played halfback and fullback.

As a sophomore, he had 2 scores in eight seconds to help upset West Texas State University. As a senior, he posted 592 rushing yards (led the conference) and 2 touchdowns. He finished his college career with 936 rushing yards, 142 receiving yards and 8 touchdowns.

== Professional career ==
=== Dallas Cowboys ===
Whitfield was signed as an undrafted free agent by the Dallas Cowboys after the 1965 NFL draft. He spent most of his rookie year in the team's taxi squad, before being waived in 1966.

=== Washington Redskins ===
The Washington Redskins claimed him off waivers on July 29, 1966. His best game came against the New York Giants, when both teams set the NFL record for most combined points (113) in a game, on November 27. Fourteen different players scored, with Whitfield accounting for two rushing touchdowns and one by reception.

Although he was mostly used as a change of pace running back, he led the Redskins in rushing in 1966 (472 yards) and in 1967 (384 yards). On September 16, 1969, he was cut and later signed to the taxi squad. He was waived on November 6.

=== BC Lions (CFL) ===
In 1970, he signed with the BC Lions of the Canadian Football League (CFL) and was second in team rushing with 754 yards.

=== Denver Broncos ===
On August 2, 1971, he was signed by the Denver Broncos. Even though he was the second leading rusher in preseason behind Floyd Little, he was released on September 16.

=== Florida Blazers (WFL) ===
After being out of football for three years, he signed with the Florida Blazers of the World Football League (WFL) in 1974 and finished with 202 rushing yards.

== Personal life ==
Whitfield worked for New York Life Insurance until his retirement. A. D. Worked at Satellite West Jr. High School in Brooklyn, NY from 1978 to 1982 as a gym teacher. He died in Dallas, Texas on September 1, 2022.
