= 1965 NFL season =

American football season

Regular season
- Duration: September 19 – December 26, 1965
- East Champions: Cleveland Browns
- West Champions: Green Bay Packers (playoff)

Championship Game
- Champions: Green Bay Packers

NFL teams: West, East

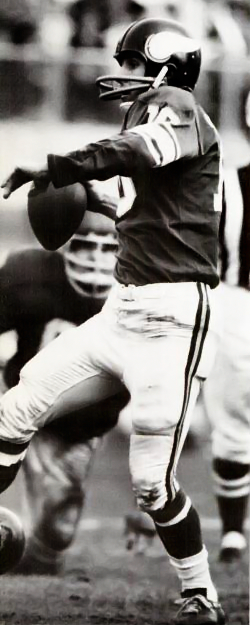
Former Minnesota Vikings QB Fran Tarkenton playing in 1965.

The 1965 NFL season was the 46th regular season of the National Football League. The Green Bay Packers won the NFL title after defeating the Cleveland Browns in the NFL Championship Game, the last before the Super Bowl era.

== War with the AFL ==
The NFL's war with the rival American Football League began to increase as the two leagues competed for the top players coming out of college. Prior to the season, both the NFL's Chicago Bears and the AFL's Kansas City Chiefs selected running back Gale Sayers in their respective league drafts. Sayers eventually decided to sign with the NFL's Bears in a victory for the established league. On the other hand, quarterback Joe Namath was selected by both the NFL's St. Louis Cardinals and the AFL's New York Jets, but Namath decided to play for the Jets after signing a $427,000 contract for three years.

This war between the AFL and the NFL would escalate until just before the 1966 season, when they would agree to merge and create a new AFL-NFL World Championship Game between the winners of the two leagues, that later would be known as the Super Bowl.

== Draft ==
The 1965 NFL draft was held on November 28, 1964, at New York City's Summit Hotel. With the first pick, the New York Giants selected back Tucker Frederickson from Auburn University.

== Major rule changes ==
- A sixth official, the Line Judge, is added to the officiating crew. This change is sometimes referred to as the "Fran Tarkenton Rule" after the Minnesota Vikings quarterback, who developed the nickname scrambler as he ran around the backfield to avoid being sacked by the opposition. With the Line Judge stationed on the line of scrimmage opposite the Head Linesman, it made it easier for the officials to judge whether or not Tarkenton or any mobile quarterback crossed over the line before throwing the ball. Five officials had been used since 1947, when the back judge was added.
- Head linesman Burl Toler became the NFL's first black official. He worked in the league through 1989.
- Officials were permitted to wear short-sleeved shirts for the first time.

== Division races ==
Each team played each of the six other teams in its division twice. In addition, each team played two of the seven teams from the other division to complete the 14-game schedule. Thus, each week's schedule included 6 intra-divisional games (3 from each division) and one inter-divisional game. In 1965 the Western Division dominated the Eastern Division winning 13 out of the 14 interdivisional games. The lone win for the Eastern Division was a 39–31 victory by Dallas over San Francisco in week eight.

As in 1964, the Eastern Division race started out as a battle between the Cardinals and the Browns. By Week Five (October 17), both had 4–1–0 records, but the Cards won only one more game after that, finishing 5–9. The Browns won all seven of their remaining divisional games during the same stretch, losing only their two inter-divisional games against Western opponents. The Browns had clinched the conference title by November 28.

In the Western Division race, Green Bay won its first six games before a 31–10 loss at Chicago on Halloween put it in a tie with the Baltimore Colts. In Week Eight (November 7), the Packers lost again, 12–7 to Detroit, while the Colts beat Chicago 26–21. Both teams won their next two games, but in Week Eleven, the Packers lost 21–10 to the Rams, and the Colts averted a loss by tying the Lions, 24–24. In Week Twelve, Green Bay closed the gap with a 24–19 win over the Vikings, while the Colts fell to Chicago, losing the game (13–0) and their star quarterback, Johnny Unitas, to a knee injury.

With backup Gary Cuozzo passing for the Colts, they met the Packers again, in Baltimore, on December 12, and Paul Hornung scored five touchdowns as Green Bay won, 42–27, to take a half-game division lead, 10–3 to 9–3–1. Along with the division lead, the Colts lost another quarterback when Cuozzo was injured. In the final weekend, the Colts were in Los Angeles for a Saturday game that they had to win but were losing 17–10. A tying touchdown by fourth-string quarterback Ed Brown helped the Colts knot the game 17–17, but a tie wasn't enough. It took Lou Michaels' field goal to get a 20–17 win and a 10–3–1 record. A Green Bay win the next day in San Francisco would have ended the race, and the Packers leading and were slightly more than a minute away from the title game, but the 49ers tied the game, 24–24, with 1:07 to play. Both Green Bay and Baltimore had 10–3–1 records, forcing a playoff for the day after Christmas.

| Week | Western | Record | Eastern | Record |
|---|---|---|---|---|
| 1 | 4 teams | 1–0–0 | 3 teams | 1–0–0 |
| 2 | 3 teams | 2–0–0 | Dallas Cowboys | 2–0–0 |
| 3 | Tie (Det, GB) | 3–0–0 | 4 teams | 2–1–0 |
| 4 | Green Bay Packers | 4–0–0 | Tie (Cle, StL) | 3–1–0 |
| 5 | Green Bay Packers | 5–0–0 | Tie (Cle, StL) | 4–1–0 |
| 6 | Green Bay Packers | 6–0–0 | Cleveland Browns | 5–1–0 |
| 7 | Tie (Bal, GB) | 6–1–0 | Cleveland Browns | 5–2–0 |
| 8 | Baltimore Colts | 7–1–0 | Cleveland Browns | 6–2–0 |
| 9 | Baltimore Colts | 8–1–0 | Cleveland Browns | 7–2–0 |
| 10 | Baltimore Colts | 9–1–0 | Cleveland Browns | 8–2–0 |
| 11 | Baltimore Colts | 9–1–1 | Cleveland Browns | 9–2–0 |
| 12 | Baltimore Colts | 9–2–1 | Cleveland Browns | 10–2–0 |
| 13 | Green Bay Packers | 10–3–0 | Cleveland Browns | 10–3–0 |
| 14 | (tie) Baltimore Colts | 10–3–1 | Cleveland Browns | 11–3–0 |
| | Green Bay Packers | 10-3-1 | | |

== Final standings ==
NFL Eastern Conference
| | W | L | T | PCT | CONF | PF | PA | STK |
|---|---|---|---|---|---|---|---|---|
| Cleveland Browns | 11 | 3 | 0 | .786 | 11–1 | 363 | 325 | W1 |
| Dallas Cowboys | 7 | 7 | 0 | .500 | 6–6 | 325 | 280 | W3 |
| New York Giants | 7 | 7 | 0 | .500 | 7–5 | 270 | 338 | L1 |
| Washington Redskins | 6 | 8 | 0 | .429 | 6–6 | 257 | 301 | W1 |
| Philadelphia Eagles | 5 | 9 | 0 | .357 | 5–7 | 363 | 359 | L1 |
| St. Louis Cardinals | 5 | 9 | 0 | .357 | 5–7 | 296 | 309 | L6 |
| Pittsburgh Steelers | 2 | 12 | 0 | .143 | 2–10 | 202 | 397 | L7 |

Note: Tie games were not officially counted in the standings until 1972.

NFL Western Conference
| | W | L | T | PCT | CONF | PF | PA | STK |
|---|---|---|---|---|---|---|---|---|
| Green Bay Packers | 10 | 3 | 1 | .769 | 8–3–1 | 316 | 224 | T1 |
| Baltimore Colts | 10 | 3 | 1 | .769 | 8–3–1 | 389 | 284 | W1 |
| Chicago Bears | 9 | 5 | 0 | .643 | 7–5 | 409 | 275 | L1 |
| San Francisco 49ers | 7 | 6 | 1 | .538 | 6–5–1 | 421 | 402 | T1 |
| Minnesota Vikings | 7 | 7 | 0 | .500 | 5–7 | 383 | 403 | W2 |
| Detroit Lions | 6 | 7 | 1 | .462 | 4–7–1 | 257 | 295 | W1 |
| Los Angeles Rams | 4 | 10 | 0 | .286 | 2–10 | 269 | 328 | L1 |

== Playoffs ==
As the Green Bay Packers and Baltimore Colts were tied for first place in the Western Division standings after the regular season ended, a divisional playoff game was required, and was held in Green Bay at Lambeau Field: although the Packers had beaten the Colts in both of their games in 1965, there were no tiebreaking rules at the time.

In the playoff game, with both Colts starting quarterback Johnny Unitas and backup Gary Cuozzo injured, Baltimore was forced to use Tom Matte, normally a running back, as quarterback: Matte played the position in college at Ohio State. Further, Packers quarterback Bart Starr was injured on the first play from scrimmage and did not return to the game, being relieved by Zeke Bratkowski.

After Green Bay's Don Chandler kicked a 27-yard field goal with less than two minutes remaining to tie the game 10-10, the playoff went into overtime, where Chandler kicked a 25-yard field goal with 1:21 remaining in the period to win the Packers the Western Division title.

The following week at Lambeau, Starr returned as starter, with the Packers defeating the Cleveland Browns in the NFL Championship Game, the last before the Super Bowl era.

Home team in capitals

Western Divisional Playoff Game

- GREEN BAY 13, Baltimore 10 (OT)

NFL Championship Game

- GREEN BAY 23, Cleveland 12

Playoff Bowl

- Baltimore 35, Dallas 3 at the Orange Bowl in Miami, Florida on January 9, 1966

The Playoff Bowl was between the divisional runners-up, for third place in the league. This was its sixth year (of ten) and it was played a week after the title game.

== Awards ==
| Most Valuable Player | Jim Brown, Fullback, Cleveland |
| Coach of the Year | George Halas, Chicago |

== Coaching changes ==
- Detroit Lions: George Wilson was replaced by Harry Gilmer.
- Pittsburgh Steelers: Buddy Parker was replaced by Mike Nixon.

== Stadium changes ==
The home of the Green Bay Packers, City Stadium, is renamed Lambeau Field in memory of team founder, player, and head coach Curly Lambeau

== See also ==
- 1965 American Football League season
