= Mike Howell =

American football player (1943–2016)

No. 34, 43
- Position: Defensive back

Personal information
- Born: July 5, 1943; West Monroe, Louisiana, U.S.
- Died: August 1, 2016 (aged 73); Monroe, Louisiana, U.S.
- Listed height: 6 ft 1 in (1.85 m)
- Listed weight: 195 lb (88 kg)

Career information
- High school: Carroll (Monroe, Louisiana)
- College: Grambling State
- NFL draft: 1965: 8th round, 111th overall pick
- AFL draft: 1965: 15th round, 118th overall pick

Career history
- Cleveland Browns (1965–1972); Miami Dolphins (1972)

Awards and highlights
- Super Bowl champion (VII)

Career NFL statistics
- Interceptions: 27
- Fumble recoveries: 2
- Sacks: 2
- Stats at Pro Football Reference

Michael Lionel Howell (July 5, 1943 – August 1, 2016) was an American professional football player who was a defensive back in the National Football League (NFL) for the Cleveland Browns and Miami Dolphins. Howell played college football for the Grambling State Tigers and was selected 111th overall by the Browns in the eighth round of the 1965 NFL draft.

A college quarterback, Howell converted to defensive back in the NFL. He felt he had no chance playing quarterback in the NFL due to his race. At the time African-Americans were stereotyped as not being able to successfully play the position. "I know I'm not going into the NFL as a black quarterback," is what Howell told his coach, the legendary Eddie Robinson. So, he changed to cornerback, winning a starting job in 1966, and moved to free safety in 1968. Howell did not miss a league game during his career in Cleveland, and intercepted 27 passes during his NFL career.

In 2012, the Cleveland Plain Dealer selected Howell as one of the 100 best players in Browns history.

Howell died on August 5, 2016 at the age of 73.
