= Dale Meinert =

American football player (1933–2004)

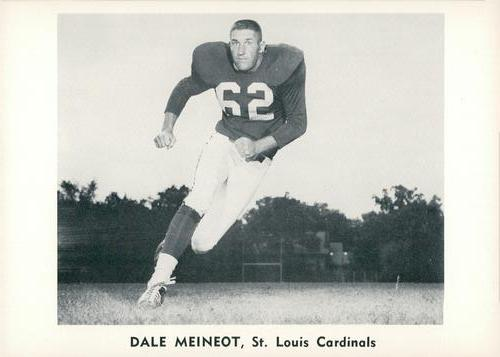
- Meinert, misspelled on the promotional image in 1961

No. 63, 65, 62
- Positions: Linebacker, guard

Personal information
- Born: December 18, 1933; Lone Wolf, Oklahoma, U.S.
- Died: May 10, 2004 (aged 70); Clinton, Oklahoma, U.S.
- Listed height: 6 ft 2 in (1.88 m)
- Listed weight: 220 lb (100 kg)

Career information
- High school: Lone Wolf
- College: Oklahoma A&M
- NFL draft: 1955: 8th round, 88th overall pick

Career history
- Edmonton Eskimos (1955–1957); Chicago / St. Louis Cardinals (1958–1967)

Awards and highlights
- 2× Grey Cup champion (1955, 1956); Second-team All-Pro (1967); 3× Pro Bowl (1963, 1965, 1967)

Career NFL statistics
- Interceptions: 9
- Interception yards: 126
- Fumble recoveries: 13
- Sacks: 12
- Defensive touchdowns: 1
- Stats at Pro Football Reference

Dale Meinert (December 18, 1933 – May 10, 2004) was an American professional football linebacker. He played ten seasons in the National Football League (NFL) for the Chicago / St. Louis Cardinals, playing his two first seasons as a guard. Previously he played three seasons with the Edmonton Eskimos of the Canadian Football League (CFL). He played college football for the Oklahoma A&M Cowboys.

== Death ==
He died after a long battle with Alzheimer's disease.
