= 1965 San Francisco 49ers season =

American football team season

- Owner: Josephine Morabito; Jane Morabito
- General manager: Louis Spadia
- Head coach: Jack Christiansen
- Home stadium: Kezar Stadium

Results
- Record: 7–6–1
- Division place: 4th NFL Western
- Playoffs: Did not qualify

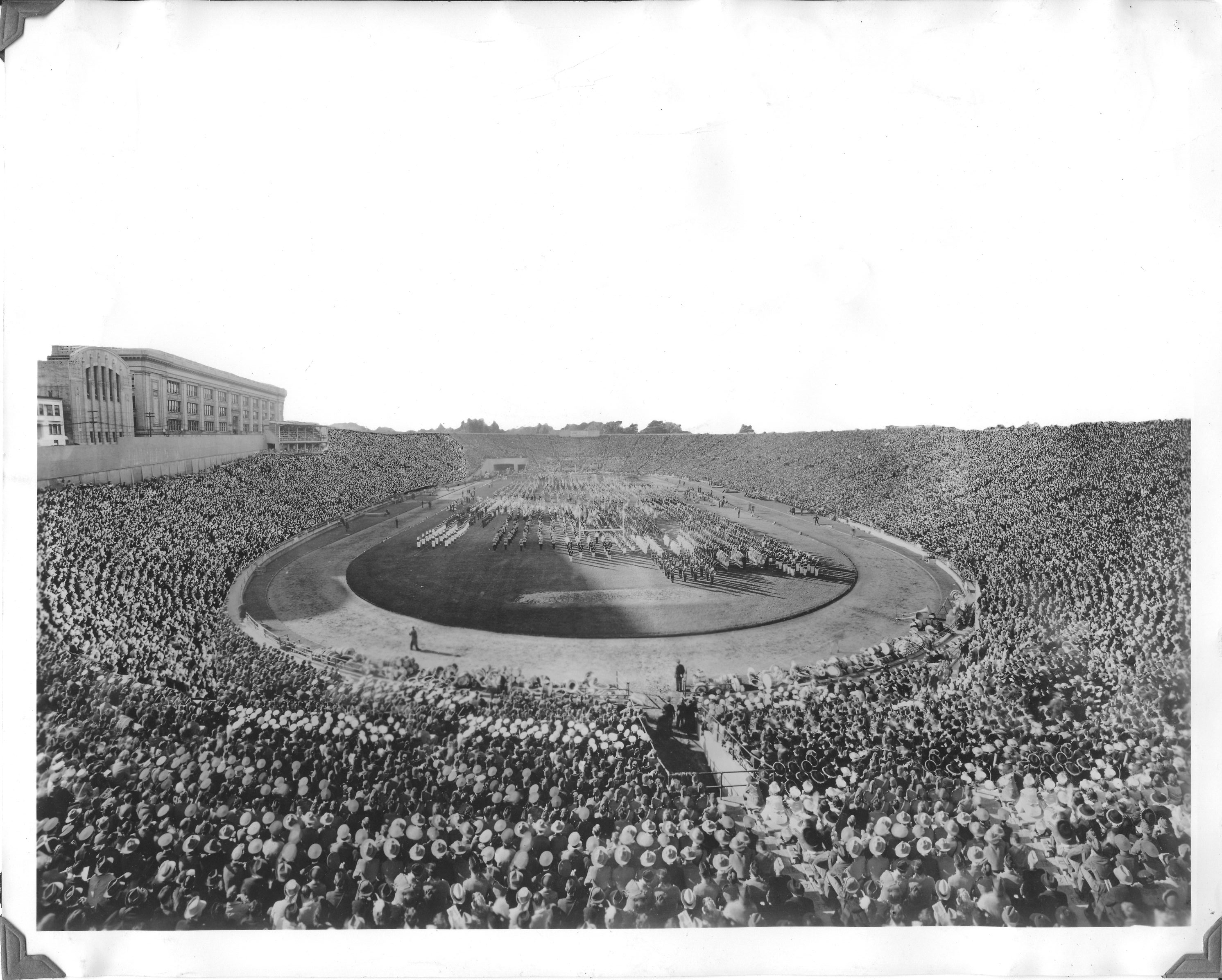
"Kezar Stadium" by Eric Fischer is licensed under CC BY 2.0

The 1965 San Francisco 49ers season was the franchise's 16th season in the National Football League, their 20th overall, and their third under head coach Jack Christiansen. They improved on their 4–10 record from 1964 and finished 7–6–1. However, they failed to qualify for the playoffs for the eighth consecutive season. Christiansen experienced his highest winning percentage in 1965, with a win loss percentage of .538.

== Regular season analysis ==
The 1965 San Francisco 49ers were 1st of 14 in the league in Points For, averaging 30.1 points per game. Despite offensive success, they were unable to overcome defensive struggles, ranking 13th of 14 in Points Against, averaging 28.7 points per game.

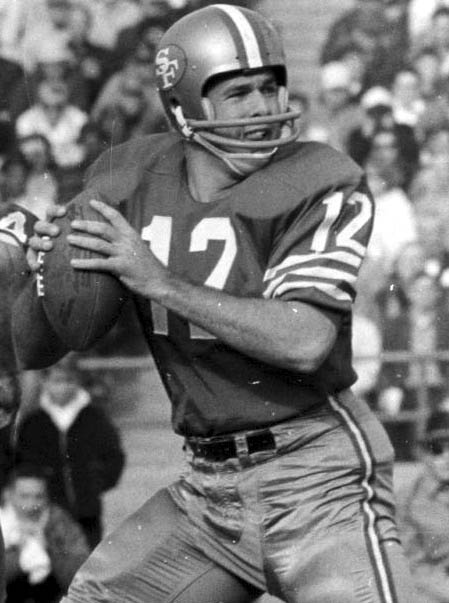
San Francisco starting quarterback John Brodie

With John Brodie playing quarterback, the 49ers' 1965 season had high expectations from around the league.

The 49ers had a strong QB–WR duo in John Brodie and Dave Parks, with a lethal playmaking ability that many compared to Joe Montana and Jerry Rice. The 49ers' first draft pick, Ken Willard, proved to be the 49ers' leading rusher with 778 yards in his rookie campaign. He averaged a dominant 4.1 yards per carry, which placed him 4th in the NFL at that time.

The 49ers started the season with a 52–24 win against the Chicago Bears at home. They highlighted much of what the public expected from their offense. The following week, the 49ers won their second straight home game to start the season 2–0 after beating the Pittsburgh Steelers 27–17.

The 49ers lost their first game on October 3 against the Baltimore Colts despite a career day for Parks, who totaled 231 receiving yards and 3 touchdowns from 9 receptions.

The 49ers lost back-to-back games, taking a 10–27 loss against the Vince Lombardi-led Green Bay Packers in Lambeau Field, a team that would win the 1965 NFL Championship Game against the Cleveland Browns.

The 49ers rallied back after two straight losses to pick up a colossal win against the Los Angeles Rams in the Los Angeles Memorial Colosseum, winning 45–21 behind three passing touchdowns from Brodie.

On October 24, the lack of emphasis on defense led to a disappointing loss to the Minnesota Vikings at home. Despite leading by as much as 21 points, the 49ers defense was unable to protect the lead and dropped their 3rd game in 4 weeks after losing 41–42. A team with all the offensive firepower in the world was beginning to slip up.

The 49ers proceeded to lose their next two games as their defense continued to struggle. Despite averaging around 33 points through their first 6 games, their defense was unable to hold up against the Baltimore Colts and the Dallas Cowboys. The 49ers lost 28–34 to the Colts at home, and lost 31–39 to the Cowboys on the road. The 49ers disappointingly fell to 3–5 despite statistically having the league's best offense.

On the road against the Detroit Lions, the 49ers picked up a huge win thanks to a 75-yard fumble recovery for a touchdown by defensive end Clark Miller. The 27–21 victory was the start of a huge late-season surge as the 49ers began looking ahead to a potential playoffs berth despite the three straight losses.

On November 21, the San Francisco 49ers hosted the Los Angeles Rams in what turned out to be a thrilling conference matchup decided by a 22-yard game-winning field goal from Tommy Davis. The 49ers won 30–27 and once again had hope for a postseason berth as they posted an even 5–5 record with four crucial matchups remaining.

John Brodie made a swift recovery from his injured shoulder, tossing a career-high five passing touchdowns and scoring 45 points on offense in a revenge win from their loss to Minnesota earlier in the season. The 49ers picked up a huge win at home the following week, beating the Detroit Lions 17–14 and putting themselves in position to make the playoffs.

The 49ers' playoff hopes came to a disappointing end after the team was destroyed at Wrigley Field by the Chicago Bears, losing 61–20 as Gale Sayers scored an NFL-record 6 touchdowns in the blowout. The 49ers proceeded to tie the Green Bay Packers the following week to finish their inconsistent season 7–6–1.

== Offseason ==
=== NFL draft ===
The San Francisco 49ers had the 2nd overall pick in the 1965 NFL draft. Although 20 players were drafted, only 13 would suit up and play an NFL game. Picks from the first ten rounds are shown below.

Round	Pick	Player	Position	School/Club team
1	2	Ken Willard	RB	North Carolina
1	13	George Donnelly	DB	Illinois
2	16	Joe Cerne	C	Northwestern
3	29	Bob Schweickert	QB	Virginia Tech
3	30	Jim Norton	DE	Washington
3	42	Jack Chapple	LB	Stanford
4	44	Larry Todd	RB	Arizona St
5	58	Dave McCormick	T	LSU
9	114	Wayne Swinford	DB	Georgia
10	128	Bob Cappadona	RB	Northeastern

== Personnel ==
=== Staff / Coaches ===
1965 San Francisco 49ers staff
Front office: Team Owner(s) - Josephine Morabito & Jane Morabito; General manager – Louis Spadia; Personnel Scout - Dick Gallagher; Head coaches: Head coach - Jack Christiansen; Offensive coaches: Chief of Offense / Offensive Coordinator - Bill Johnson; Offensive Ends – Billy Wilson; Offensive Consultant – Y.A. Tittle	Defensive coaches: Defensive Assistant – Dick Voris; Defensive Backfield / Secondary – Jim David; Special teams coaches: None - N/A

=== Roster ===
1965 San Francisco 49ers roster
Quarterbacks (QB): 12 John Brodie; 17 Billy Kilmer; 10 George Mira; Running backs (RB): 44 John David Crow; 32 Rudy Johnson; 43 David Kopay; 22 Gary Lewis; 40 Ken Willard; Wide receivers (WR): 30 Bernie Casey; 26 Kay McFarland; 29 Dale Messer; 81 Dave Parks; Tight ends (TE): 84 Vern Burke; 85 Monty Stickles	Offensive linemen (OL): 77 Bruce Bosley C; 55 Joe Cerne C; 68 Howard Mudd G; 67 Walt Rock T; 76 Len Rohde T; 78 John Thomas G; 63 Jim Wilson G; Defensive linemen (DL): 70 Charlie Krueger DT; 60 Roland Lakes DT; 74 Clark Miller DE; 75 Jim Norton DT; 52 Karl Rubke DE; 65 Chuck Sieminski DE/DT	Linebackers (LB): 50 Ed Beard MLB; 58 Jack Chapple OLB; 57 Floyd Dean OLB; 53 Mike Dowdle MLB; 55 Matt Hazeltine OLB; 64 Dave Wilcox OLB; Defensive backs (DB): 39 Kermit Alexander FS/CB; 20 George Donnelly FS; 37 Jimmy Johnson CB; 45 Elbert Kimbrough SS; 80 Jerry Mertens WR/CB; 23 Wayne Swinford CB/S; Special teams (ST): 36 Tommy Davis K/P	Practice squad: 54 Bob Harrison LB; 87 Dan LaRose DE; 82 Bob Poole TE; Reserve: 86 Dan Colchico DE (IR); Rookies in italics

== Preseason ==
Week	Date	Opponent	Result	Record	Venue
1	August 15	Cleveland Browns	L 21–37	0–1	Kezar Stadium
2	August 21	vs. Dallas Cowboys	W 27–7	1–1	Multnomah Stadium
3	August 27	at St. Louis Cardinals	T 17–17	1–1–1	Busch Stadium (I)
4	September 4	vs. Pittsburgh Steelers	W 23–9	2–1–1	Brown Stadium
5	September 12	at Los Angeles Rams	L 14–34	2–2–1	Los Angeles Memorial Coliseum

== Regular season ==
=== Schedule ===
Week	Date	Opponent	Result	Record	Venue	Recap
1	September 19	**Chicago Bears**	**W** 52–24	1–0	Kezar Stadium	Recap
2	September 26	Pittsburgh Steelers	**W** 27–17	2–0	Kezar Stadium	Recap
3	October 3	at **Baltimore Colts**	**L** 24–27	2–1	Memorial Stadium	Recap
4	October 10	at **Green Bay Packers**	**L** 10–27	2–2	Lambeau Field	Recap
5	October 17	at **Los Angeles Rams**	**W** 45–21	3–2	Los Angeles Memorial Coliseum	Recap
6	October 24	**Minnesota Vikings**	**L** 41–42	3–3	Kezar Stadium	Recap
7	October 31	**Baltimore Colts**	**L** 28–34	3–4	Kezar Stadium	Recap
8	November 7	at Dallas Cowboys	**L** 31–39	3–5	Cotton Bowl	Recap
9	November 14	at **Detroit Lions**	**W** 27–21	4–5	Tiger Stadium	Recap
10	November 21	**Los Angeles Rams**	**W** 30–27	5–5	Kezar Stadium	Recap
11	November 28	at **Minnesota Vikings**	**W** 45–24	6–5	Metropolitan Stadium	Recap
12	December 5	**Detroit Lions**	**W** 17–14	7–5	Kezar Stadium	Recap
13	December 12	at **Chicago Bears**	**L** 20–61	7–6	Wrigley Field	Recap
14	December 19	**Green Bay Packers**	**T** 24–24	7–6–1	Kezar Stadium	Recap
Note: Intra-conference opponents are in **bold** text.

=== Standings ===
NFL Western Conference
	W	L	T	PCT	CONF	PF	PA	STK
Green Bay Packers	10	3	1	.769	8–3–1	316	224	T1
Baltimore Colts	10	3	1	.769	8–3–1	389	284	W1
Chicago Bears	9	5	0	.643	7–5	409	275	L1
San Francisco 49ers	7	6	1	.538	6–5–1	421	402	T1
Minnesota Vikings	7	7	0	.500	5–7	383	403	W2
Detroit Lions	6	7	1	.462	4–7–1	257	295	W1
Los Angeles Rams	4	10	0	.286	2–10	269	328	L1

Note: Tie games were not officially counted in the standings until 1972.

== Awards, records, and honors ==
The 1965 San Francisco 49ers had 4 Pro Bowlers and 1 First Team All-Pro players.

John Brodie - Pro Bowl Selection

Ken Willard - Pro Bowl Selection

John David Crow - Pro Bowl Selection

Dave Parks - Pro Bowl Selection, First Team All-Pro

== Bibliography ==
- Newhouse, Dave (2015). Founding 49ers: The Dark Days before the Dynasty. The Kent State University Press. pp. 130–133.
  - This book written by Dave Newhouse provides an analysis of the San Francisco 49ers throughout different eras. Goes into detail regarding the culture and experiences throughout the 1965 NFL season.
- Schudel, Jeff (2021). "56 years ago, Browns lost 1965 NFL championship to Packers in Lambeau quagmire". The News-Herald.
  - Offers perspective of talent and performance from the 1965 NFL season. The Green Bay Packers played the San Francisco 49ers on Dec. 19, 1965 and tied 24–24, resulting in a 7–6–1 finish for the 49ers.
- "1965 San Francisco 49ers Statistics & Players". Pro-Football-Reference.com.
  - Provides in-depth analysis of statistics, as well as performance. Details weekly statistics as well as player accolades
- Knowles, Bryan (June 25, 2017). "San Francisco 49ers: 10 Best Rookie Seasons in Franchise History". Niner Noise.
  - Offers valuable insight on Ken Willard's rookie season from 1965, as well as additional context to his season. His role was very important to the offensive success of the 49ers that season.
