= 1965 Pittsburgh Steelers season =

NFL team season

- Owner: Art Rooney
- Head coach: Mike Nixon
- Home stadium: Pitt Stadium

Results
- Record: 2–12
- Division place: 7th NFL Eastern
- Playoffs: Did not qualify

The 1965 Pittsburgh Steelers season was the team's 33rd in the National Football League.

The team set a modern NFL record with a minus-30 turnover ratio. Their -195 point differential is the worst in Steelers history.

== Offseason ==
=== NFL draft ===
1965 Pittsburgh Steelers draft
Round	Pick	Player	Position	College	Notes
2	18	Roy Jefferson *	Wide receiver	Utah	
Made roster * Made at least one Pro Bowl during career

=== Undrafted free agents ===
1965 undrafted free agents of note
Player	Position	College
Bruce Smith	Wide receiver	BYU

== Roster ==
1965 Pittsburgh Steelers roster
Quarterbacks (QB): 14 Bill Nelsen; 16 Tommy Wade; Running backs (RB): 23 Jim Butler; 42 Dick Hoak; 38 Mike Lind; 36 Clarence Peaks; 33 Theron Sapp; Wide receivers (WR): 85 Gary Ballman; 20 Paul Martha; 25 Jerry Simmons; 28 Clendon Thomas S; Tight ends (TE): 84 Lee Folkins; 82 John Hilton	Offensive linemen (OL): 67 Ed Adamchik G; 71 Charlie Bradshaw T; 51 Ken Henson C; 77 Dan James T; 72 Ray Lemek G; 73 Ray Mansfield C/DT; 65 Bob Nichols T; Defensive linemen (DL): 78 John Baker DE; 74 Riley Gunnels DT; 64 Chuck Hinton DT; 75 Ken Kortas DT; 61 Fran Mallick DE; 60 Ben McGee DE	Linebackers (LB): 63 Rod Breedlove OLB/MLB; 52 Gene Breen OLB; 53 John Campbell OLB; 54 Max Messner OLB; 66 Myron Pottios MLB; Defensive backs (DB): 24 Jim Bradshaw FS; 44 Willie Daniel CB; 29 Bob Hohn CB; 26 Brady Keys CB; 49 Bob Sherman FS/SS; 47 Marv Woodson CB/SS; Special teams (ST): 83 Mike Clark K; 46 Frank Lambert P	Practice squad: -- Tom Bailey G; -- Whit Canale DE/DT; -- Tom Kennedy QB; -- Kraig Lofquist RB; 68 Mike Magac G; 58 Ed Pine LB; 88 John Powers TE; Reserve: 56 Art Hunter C (IR); 87 Roy Jefferson WR (IR); 35 John Henry Johnson RB (IR); -- Mel Profit TE (DNR); -- Andy Russell LB (Military); 62 Mike Sandusky G (IR); 50 Bill Saul LB (IR); 67 Bob Schmitz LB (IR); Rookies in italics 39 active, 8 reserve, 7 practice squad

== Regular season ==
=== Schedule ===
Week	Date	Opponent	Result	Record	Venue
1	September 19	Green Bay Packers	**L** 9–41	0–1	Pitt Stadium
2	September 26	at San Francisco 49ers	**L** 17–27	0–2	Kezar Stadium
3	October 3	**New York Giants**	**L** 13–23	0–3	Pitt Stadium
4	October 9	at **Cleveland Browns**	**L** 19–24	0–4	Cleveland Municipal Stadium
5	October 17	**St. Louis Cardinals**	**L** 7–20	0–5	Pitt Stadium
6	October 24	at **Philadelphia Eagles**	**W** 20–14	1–5	Franklin Field
7	October 31	**Dallas Cowboys**	**W** 22–13	2–5	Pitt Stadium
8	November 7	at **St. Louis Cardinals**	**L** 17–21	2–6	Busch Stadium (I)
9	November 14	at **Dallas Cowboys**	**L** 17–24	2–7	Cotton Bowl
10	November 21	**Washington Redskins**	**L** 3–31	2–8	Pitt Stadium
11	November 28	**Cleveland Browns**	**L** 21–42	2–9	Pitt Stadium
12	December 5	at **New York Giants**	**L** 10–35	2–10	Yankee Stadium
13	December 12	**Philadelphia Eagles**	**L** 13–47	2–11	Pitt Stadium
14	December 19	at **Washington Redskins**	**L** 14–35	2–12	D. C. Stadium

Note: Intra-conference opponents are in bold text.

=== Game summaries ===
==== Week 1 (Sunday September 19, 1965): Green Bay Packers ====
	1	2	3	4	Total
**Packers**	0	7	13	21	**41**
Steelers	0	9	0	0	**9**

at Pitt Stadium, Pittsburgh, Pennsylvania

- Game time:
- Game weather:
- Game attendance: 38,383
- Referee:
- TV announcers:

Scoring Drives:

- Pittsburgh – FG Clark 21
- Pittsburgh – FG Clark 34
- Green Bay – Adderley 34 interception (Chandler kick)
- Pittsburgh – FG Clark 32
- Green Bay – Fleming 31 pass from Starr (Chandler kick)
- Green Bay – FG Chandler 9
- Green Bay – FG Chandler 19
- Green Bay – Hornung 10 pass from Starr (Chandler kick)
- Green Bay – Pitts 2 run (Chandler kick)
- Green Bay – Pitts 2 run (Chandler kick)

==== Week 2 (Sunday September 26, 1965): San Francisco 49ers ====
	1	2	3	4	Total
Steelers	7	0	10	0	**17**
**49ers**	7	6	7	7	**27**

at Kezar Stadium, San Francisco, California

- Game time:
- Game weather:
- Game attendance: 30,140
- Referee:
- TV announcers:

Scoring Drives:

- San Francisco – Crow 49 pass from Brodie (Davis kick)
- Pittsburgh – Hoak 1 run (Clark kick)
- San Francisco – FG Davis 37
- San Francisco – FG Davis 27
- Pittsburgh – FG Clark 32
- San Francisco – Wiltard 9 run (Davis kick)
- Pittsburgh – Campbell 15 fumble return (Clark kick)
- San Francisco – Brodie 4 run (Davis kick)

==== Week 3 (Sunday October 3, 1965): New York Giants ====
	1	2	3	4	Total
**Giants**	7	7	0	9	**23**
Steelers	0	3	3	7	**13**

at Pitt Stadium, Pittsburgh, Pennsylvania

- Game time:
- Game weather:
- Game attendance: 31,871
- Referee:
- TV announcers:

Scoring Drives:

- New York Giants – Thurlow 6 run (Stynchula kick)
- Pittsburgh – FG Clark 22
- New York Giants – Morrison 4 pass form Morrall (Stynchula kick)
- Pittsburgh – FG Clark 48
- New York Giants – FG Timberlake 43
- Pittsburgh – Hoak 1 run (Clark kick)
- New York Giants – Thomas 29 pass form Morrall (kick failed)

==== Week 4 (Saturday October 9, 1965): Cleveland Browns ====
	1	2	3	4	Total
Steelers	0	6	6	7	**19**
**Browns**	10	0	7	7	**24**

at Cleveland Municipal Stadium, Cleveland, Ohio

- Game time:
- Game weather:
- Game attendance: 80,187
- Referee:
- TV announcers:

Scoring Drives:

- Cleveland – FG Groza 38
- Cleveland – Brown 4 pass from Ryan (Groza kick)
- Pittsburgh – Nelsen 1 run (kick failed)
- Pittsburgh – Hoak – 42 run (kick failed)
- Cleveland – Brown 1 run (Groza kick)
- Pittsburgh – Hoak 15 run (Clark kick)
- Cleveland – Collins 14 pass from Ryan (Groza kick)

==== Week 5 (Sunday October 17, 1965): St. Louis Cardinals ====
	1	2	3	4	Total
**Cardinals**	7	0	3	10	**20**
Steelers	7	0	0	0	**7**

at Pitt Stadium, Pittsburgh, Pennsylvania

- Game time:
- Game weather:
- Game attendance: 31,085
- Referee:
- TV announcers:

Scoring Drives:

- St. Louis – Randle 8 pass from Johnson (Bakken kick)
- Pittsburgh – Ballman 5 run (Clark kick)
- St. Louis – FG Bakken 32
- St. Louis – Conrad 71 pass from Johnson (Bakken kick)
- St. Louis – FG Bakken 35

==== Week 6 (Sunday October 24, 1965): Philadelphia Eagles ====
	1	2	3	4	Total
**Steelers**	6	7	7	0	**20**
Eagles	7	0	0	7	**14**

at Franklin Field, Philadelphia

- Game time:
- Game weather:
- Game attendance: 56,515
- Referee:
- TV announcers:

Scoring Drives:

- Philadelphia – Gros 4 run (Baker kick)
- Pittsburgh – Daniel 17 fumble return (kick failed)
- Pittsburgh – J. Bradshaw 82 interception return (Clark kick)
- Pittsburgh – Lind 4 pass from Nelsen (Clark kick)
- Philadelphia – Poage 14 pass from Concannon (Baker kick)

As of 2024, this remains the Steelers last win over the Eagles in Philadelphia.

==== Week 7 (Sunday October 31, 1965): Dallas Cowboys ====
	1	2	3	4	Total
Cowboys	6	0	7	0	**13**
**Steelers**	0	19	0	3	**22**

at Pitt Stadium, Pittsburgh, Pennsylvania

- Game time:
- Game weather:
- Game attendance: 37,804
- Referee:
- TV announcers:

Scoring Drives:

- Dallas – Smith 2 pass from Meredith (kick failed)
- Pittsburgh – Hoak 2 pass from Nelsen (kick failed)
- Pittsburgh – Ballman 20 pass from Nelsen (kick failed)
- Pittsburgh – Ballman 72 pass from Nelsen (Clark kick)
- Dallas – Gent 8 pass from Meredith (Villanueva kick)
- Pittsburgh – FG Clark 18

==== Week 8 (Sunday November 7, 1965): St. Louis Cardinals ====
	1	2	3	4	Total
Steelers	3	0	0	14	**17**
**Cardinals**	0	7	7	7	**21**

at Busch Stadium, St. Louis, Missouri

- Game time:
- Game weather:
- Game attendance: 31,899
- Referee:
- TV announcers:

Scoring Drives:

- Pittsburgh – FG Clark 11
- St. Louis – Triplett 3 run (Bakken kick)
- St. Louis – Randle 15 pass from Johnson (Bakken kick)
- Pittsburgh – Jefferson 50 pass from Nelsen (Clark kick)
- Pittsburgh – Lind 2 run (Clark kick)
- St. Louis – Gambrell 59 pass from Johnson (Bakken kick)

==== Week 9 (Sunday November 14, 1965): Dallas Cowboys ====
	1	2	3	4	Total
Steelers	7	0	10	0	**17**
**Cowboys**	7	3	0	14	**24**

at Cotton Bowl, Dallas, Texas

- Game time:
- Game weather:
- Game attendance: 57,293
- Referee:
- TV announcers:

Scoring Drives:

- Pittsburgh – Hoak 3 run (Clark kick)
- Dallas – Clarke 1 pass from Meredith (Villanueva kick)
- Dallas – FG Villanueva 33
- Pittsburgh – FG Clark 32
- Pittsburgh – Folkins 18 fumble return (Clark kick)
- Dallas – Reeves 2 run (Villanueva kick)
- Dallas – Hayes 28 pass from Meredith (Villanueva kick)

==== Week 10 (Sunday November 21, 1965): Washington Redskins ====
	1	2	3	4	Total
**Redskins**	0	10	14	7	**31**
Steelers	3	0	0	0	**3**

at Pitt Stadium, Pittsburgh, Pennsylvania

- Game time:
- Game weather:
- Game attendance: 25,052
- Referee:
- TV announcers:

Scoring Drives:

- Pittsburgh – FG Clark 34
- Washington – Lewis 1 run (Jencks kick)
- Washington – FG Jencks 9
- Washington – Taylor 8 run (Jencks kick)
- Washington – Coia 45 pass from Jurgensen (Jencks kick)
- Washington – Harris 57 punt return (Jencks kick)

==== Week 11 (Sunday November 28, 1965): Cleveland Browns ====
	1	2	3	4	Total
**Browns**	0	7	14	21	**42**
Steelers	0	0	7	14	**21**

at Pitt Stadium, Pittsburgh, Pennsylvania

- Game time:
- Game weather:
- Game attendance: 42,757
- Referee:
- TV announcers:

Scoring Drives:

- Cleveland – Kelly 56 punt return (Groza kick)
- Cleveland – Brown 2 run (Groza kick)
- Cleveland – Brown 2 run (Groza kick)
- Pittsburgh – Ballman 87 pass from Nelsen (Clark kick)
- Cleveland – Brown 15 run (Groza kick)
- Pittsburgh – Butler 43 pass from Nelsen (Clark kick)
- Cleveland – Brewer 25 pass from Ninowski (Groza kick)
- Pittsburgh – Thomas 80 pass from Nelsen (Clark kick)
- Cleveland – Brown 27 pass from Ninowski (Groza kick)

==== Week 12 (Sunday December 5, 1965): New York Giants ====
	1	2	3	4	Total
Steelers	3	7	0	0	**10**
**Giants**	7	21	0	7	**35**

at Yankee Stadium, The Bronx, New York

- Game time:
- Game weather:
- Game attendance: 62,735
- Referee:
- TV announcers:

Scoring Drives:

- New York Giants – Shofner 33 pass from Morrall (Timberlake kick)
- Pittsburgh – FG Clark 25
- Pittsburgh – Ballman 1 run (Clark kick)
- New York Giants – Frederickson 13 run (Timberlake kick)
- New York Giants – Frederickson 3 run (Timberlake kick)
- New York Giants – Frederickson 19 pass from Morrall (Timberlake kick)
- New York Giants – Jones 28 pass from Wood (Timberlake kick)

==== Week 13 (Sunday December 12, 1965): Philadelphia Eagles ====
	1	2	3	4	Total
**Eagles**	27	7	6	7	**47**
Steelers	0	13	0	0	**13**

at Pitt Stadium, Pittsburgh, Pennsylvania

- Game time:
- Game weather:
- Game attendance: 22,002
- Referee:
- TV announcers:

Scoring Drives:

- Philadelphia – Gros 2 run (Baker kick)
- Philadelphia – Retzlaff 13 pass from Snead (kick failed)
- Philadelphia – Matson 8 run (Baker kick)
- Philadelphia – Baughan 33 interception return (Baker kick)
- Philadelphia – Nettles 56 interception return (Baker kick)
- Pittsburgh – Ballman 20 pass from Wade (Clark kick)
- Pittsburgh – Woodson 61 interception return (kick failed)
- Philadelphia – Tarasovic 40 interception return (kick failed)
- Philadelphia – Lang 8 run (Baker kick)

==== Week 14 (December 19, 1965): Washington Redskins ====
	1	2	3	4	Total
Steelers	0	14	0	0	**14**
**Redskins**	14	14	7	0	**35**

at D.C. Stadium, Washington, D.C.

- Game time:
- Game weather:
- Game attendance: 49,806
- Referee:
- TV announcers:

Scoring Drives:

- Washington – Lewis 10 pass from Jurgensen (Jencks kick)
- Washington – Harris 34 interception (Jencks kick)
- Pittsburgh – Ballman 2 run (Clark kick)
- Washington – Walters 63 interception return (Jencks kick)
- Pittsburgh – Ballman 44 pass from Wade (Clark kick)
- Washington – Pellegrini 31 fumble return (Jencks kick)
- Washington – Hughley 4 pass from Jurgensen (Jencks kick)

== Standings ==
NFL Eastern Conference
	W	L	T	PCT	CONF	PF	PA	STK
Cleveland Browns	11	3	0	.786	11–1	363	325	W1
Dallas Cowboys	7	7	0	.500	6–6	325	280	W3
New York Giants	7	7	0	.500	7–5	270	338	L1
Washington Redskins	6	8	0	.429	6–6	257	301	W1
Philadelphia Eagles	5	9	0	.357	5–7	363	359	L1
St. Louis Cardinals	5	9	0	.357	5–7	296	309	L6
Pittsburgh Steelers	2	12	0	.143	2–10	202	397	L7

Note: Tie games were not officially counted in the standings until 1972.
