= 1965 Green Bay Packers season =

NFL team season

- General manager: Vince Lombardi
- Head coach: Vince Lombardi
- Home stadium: Lambeau Field; Milwaukee County Stadium

Results
- Record: 10–3–1
- Division place: 1st NFL Western
- Playoffs: Won Western Conference Playoff (vs. Colts) 13–10; Won NFL Championship (vs. Browns) 23–12

The 1965 Green Bay Packers season was their 47th season overall and their 45th season in the National Football League. The team finished with a 10–3–1 record under seventh-year head coach Vince Lombardi, earning a tie for first place in the Western Conference with the Baltimore Colts.

In the final regular season game at Kezar Stadium in San Francisco, a late touchdown by the 49ers caused a tie and dropped Green Bay into a tie with the Colts. Although the Packers defeated Baltimore twice during the regular season, the rules at the time required a tiebreaker playoff, played in Green Bay on December 26. With backup quarterbacks playing for both teams, the Packers tied the Colts late and won in overtime, 13–10.

Green Bay then met the defending champion Cleveland Browns (11–3) in the NFL championship game, also at Green Bay. The Packers won, 23–12, for their ninth NFL title and third under Lombardi. It was the last NFL championship game before the advent of the Super Bowl and the first of three consecutive league titles for Green Bay.

Known as "New City Stadium" for its first eight seasons, the Packers' venue in Green Bay was renamed Lambeau Field in August 1965 in memory of Packers founder, player, and long-time head coach, Curly Lambeau, who had died two months earlier.

== Off-season ==
=== NFL draft ===
1965 Green Bay Packers draft
Round	Pick	Player	Position	College	Notes
1	7	Donny Anderson *	Running back	Texas Tech	
2	24	Alphonse Dotson	Defensive tackle	Grambling	Signed with the AFL
3	22	Allen Brown	Tight end	Ole Miss	
4	52	Wally Mahle	Back	Syracuse	
5	59	Jim Harvey	Guard	Ole Miss	Signed with the AFL
5	66	Doug Goodwin	Running back	Maryland-Eastern Shore	
6	74	Richard Koeper	Offensive tackle	Oregon State	
6	80	Bill Symons	Running back	Colorado	
7	85	Jerry Roberts	Back	Baldwin Wallace	
7	86	Roger Jacobazzi	Tackle	Wisconsin	
7	94	Junior Coffey	Running back	Washington	
8	108	Mike Shinn	End	Kansas	
Made roster * Made at least one Pro Bowl during career

=== Undrafted free agents ===
1965 undrafted free agents of note
Player	Position	College
John Housel	Tackle	Wofford
Sonny Redders	Running back	Wisconsin–Stevens Point

== Roster ==
1965 Green Bay Packers roster
Quarterbacks (QB): 12 Zeke Bratkowski; 10 Dennis Claridge; 15 Bart Starr; Running backs (RB): 41 Junior Coffey; 5 Paul Hornung; 35 Allen Jacobs; 25 Tom Moore; 22 Elijah Pitts; 31 Jim Taylor; Wide receivers (WR): 84 Carroll Dale; 86 Boyd Dowler; 80 Bob Long; 85 Max McGee; Tight ends (TE): 88 Bill Anderson; 81 Marv Fleming	Offensive linemen (OL): 57 Ken Bowman C; 50 Bill Curry C/MLB; 75 Forrest Gregg G/T; 67 Dan Grimm G; 64 Jerry Kramer G; 76 Bob Skoronski T; 63 Fuzzy Thurston G; 72 Steve Wright T; Defensive linemen (DL): 82 Lionel Aldridge DE; 87 Willie Davis DE; 74 Henry Jordan DT; 70 Bud Marshall DT; 77 Ron Kostelnik DT; 71 Lloyd Voss DE	Linebackers (LB): 60 Lee Roy Caffey OLB; 37 Tommy Joe Crutcher OLB/MLB; 66 Ray Nitschke MLB; 89 Dave Robinson OLB; Defensive backs (DB): 26 Herb Adderley CB; 46 Hank Gremminger SS; 43 Doug Hart CB; 21 Bob Jeter CB; 24 Willie Wood FS; 40 Tom Brown SS; Special teams (ST): 34 Don Chandler K/P	Practice squad: Larry Moore K; Eli Strand G; Reserve: 83 Allen Brown TE (IR); Rookies in italics

== Preseason ==
Date	Opponent	Site	Result	Score

== Regular season ==
=== Schedule ===
Week	Date	Opponent	Result	Record	Venue	Attendance
1	September 19	at Pittsburgh Steelers	**W** 41–9	1–0	Pitt Stadium	38,383
2	September 26	**Baltimore Colts**	**W** 20–17	2–0	Milwaukee County Stadium	48,130
3	October 3	**Chicago Bears**	**W** 23–14	3–0	Lambeau Field	50,852
4	October 10	**San Francisco 49ers**	**W** 27–10	4–0	Lambeau Field	50,852
5	October 17	at **Detroit Lions**	**W** 31–21	5–0	Tiger Stadium	56,712
6	October 24	Dallas Cowboys	**W** 13–3	6–0	Milwaukee County Stadium	48,311
7	October 31	at **Chicago Bears**	**L** 10–31	6–1	Wrigley Field	45,664
8	November 7	**Detroit Lions**	**L** 7–12	6–2	Lambeau Field	50,852
9	November 14	**Los Angeles Rams**	**W** 6–3	7–2	Milwaukee County Stadium	48,485
10	November 21	at **Minnesota Vikings**	**W** 38–13	8–2	Metropolitan Stadium	47,426
11	November 28	at **Los Angeles Rams**	**L** 10–21	8–3	Los Angeles Memorial Coliseum	39,733
12	December 5	**Minnesota Vikings**	**W** 24–19	9–3	Lambeau Field	50,852
13	December 12	at **Baltimore Colts**	**W** 42–27	10–3	Memorial Stadium	60,238
14	December 19	at **San Francisco 49ers**	**T** 24–24	10–3–1	Kezar Stadium	45,710
Note: Intra-conference opponents are in **bold** text.

=== Game summaries ===
==== Week 2 ====
Team	1	2	3	4	Total
Colts	3	7	0	7	17
• **Packers**	0	10	0	10	20

- Date: September 26
- Location: Milwaukee County Stadium • Milwaukee, Wisconsin
- Game start: 12:30 pm CST
- Game weather: 47 °F (8 °C) • Wind 16 mph

Scoring summary
1	BAL	Lou Michaels 26-yard field goal	Colts 3–0
2	GB	Don Chandler 17-yard field goal	Tie 3–3
2	GB	Herb Adderley 44-yard interception return (Don Chandler kick)	Packers 10–3
2	BAL	Jerry Hill 1-yard run (Lou Michaels kick)	Tie 10–10
4	GB	Don Chandler 41-yard field goal	Packers 13–10
4	BAL	Raymond Berry 5-yard pass from Johnny Unitas (Lou Michaels kick)	Colts 17–13
4	GB	Max McGee 37-yard pass from Bart Starr (Don Chandler kick)	Packers 20–17

=== Playoffs ===
Round	Date	Opponent	Result	Venue	Attendance	Recap
Conference	December 26	Baltimore Colts	**W** 13–10 (OT)	Lambeau Field	50,484	Recap
Championship	January 2, 1966	Cleveland Browns	**W** 23–12	Lambeau Field	50,777	Recap

== Standings ==
NFL Western Conference
	W	L	T	PCT	CONF	PF	PA	STK
Green Bay Packers	10	3	1	.769	8–3–1	316	224	T1
Baltimore Colts	10	3	1	.769	8–3–1	389	284	W1
Chicago Bears	9	5	0	.643	7–5	409	275	L1
San Francisco 49ers	7	6	1	.538	6–5–1	421	402	T1
Minnesota Vikings	7	7	0	.500	5–7	383	403	W2
Detroit Lions	6	7	1	.462	4–7–1	257	295	W1
Los Angeles Rams	4	10	0	.286	2–10	269	328	L1

Note: Tie games were not officially counted in the standings until 1972.
