= 1965 Chicago Bears season =

NFL team season

- Owner: George Halas
- General manager: George Halas
- Head coach: George Halas
- Home stadium: Wrigley Field

Results
- Record: 9–5
- Division place: 3rd Western
- Playoffs: Did not qualify

The 1965 Chicago Bears season was their 46th regular season in the National Football League. The team improved upon the dismal 5–9 record of the previous season, and finished with a 9–5 record that earned them a third-place finish in the NFL Western Conference.

The Bears started the season 0–3, but thanks to rookies Gale Sayers and Dick Butkus, the team won 9 of the last 11 games. Sayers had a magnificent rookie season, and in one game against the San Francisco 49ers at Chicago's Wrigley Field on December 12, he scored six touchdowns in a 61–20 Bears win, the first time the Bears scored 61 points in a regular-season game. Sayers would set an NFL rookie record with 22 touchdowns in one season. The six-touchdown performance tied an NFL record and set a new Bears record. Quarterback Rudy Bukich completed 176 of 312 passes for 2,641 yards and 20 touchdowns.

The 1965 Bears draft class was named No. 8 on NFL Top 10 draft classes.

== Off-season ==
=== NFL draft ===
1965 Chicago Bears draft
Round	Pick	Player	Position	College	Notes
1	3	Dick Butkus * ^{†}	Linebacker	Illinois	
1	4	Gale Sayers * ^{†}	Running back	Kansas	
4	45	Jim Nance	Fullback	Syracuse	Signed with the AFL
6	73	Tony Carey	Running back	Notre Dame	
7	88	Dick Gordon *	Wide receiver	Michigan State	
7	90	Mickey Sutton	Safety	Auburn	Signed with the AFL
8	101	Brian Schweda	Defensive end	Kansas	
Made roster † Pro Football Hall of Fame * Made at least one Pro Bowl during career

=== Undrafted free agents ===
1965 undrafted free agents of note
Player	Position	College
Doyle Hill	Quarterback	North Alabama

== Roster ==
1965 Chicago Bears roster
Quarterbacks (QB): 10 Rudy Bukich; 9 Billy Wade; Running backs (RB): 21 Jon Arnett; 29 Ronnie Bull; 32 Ralph Kurek; 48 Andy Livingston; 34 Joe Marconi; 40 Gale Sayers; Wide receivers (WR): 45 Dick Gordon; 80 Jimmy Jones; 47 Johnny Morris; Tight ends (TE): 49 Charlie Bivins; 89 Mike Ditka; 85 Billy Martin	Offensive linemen (OL): 72 Jim Cadile G; 70 Herman Lee T; 57 Dick Leeuwenburg T; 50 Mike Pyle C; 64 Mike Rabold G; 67 George Seals G; 63 Bob Wetoska T; Defensive linemen (DL): 81 Doug Atkins DE; 79 Dick Evey DT; 76 John Johnson DT; 78 Stan Jones DT; 71 Earl Leggett DT; 87 Ed O'Bradovich DE	Linebackers (LB): 51 Dick Butkus MLB; 31 Joe Fortunato OLB; 83 Roger LeClerc K/C/OLB; 33 Larry Morris OLB; 53 Jim Purnell MLB; 62 Mike Reilly OLB; Defensive backs (DB): 25 J. C. Caroline CB; 26 Bennie McRae CB; 17 Richie Petitbon SS; 84 Ron Smith CB/S; 24 Rosey Taylor FS; 23 Dave Whitsell CB; Special teams (ST): 88 Bobby Joe Green P	Practice squad: -- Frank Budka S; 68 George Burman C/T; 37 Mike Eischeid K; 73 Dennis Murphy DT; 59 David Price DE; -- Gregg Schumacher DE; 27 John Sisk S; Reserve: 61 Bill George LB (IR); 43 Larry Glueck S (IR); 52 Fred Hageman C (IR); 74 Bob Kilcullen DT (IR); 75 Riley Mattson T (IR); 41 Brian Piccolo RB (IR); 69 Palmer Pyle G (IR); 12 Larry Rakestraw QB (IR); 60 Brian Schweda DE (IR); Rookies in italics

== Regular season ==
=== Schedule ===
Week	Date	Opponent	Result	Record	Venue
1	September 19	at **San Francisco 49ers**	**L** 24–52	0–1	Kezar Stadium
2	September 26	at **Los Angeles Rams**	**L** 28–30	0–2	Los Angeles Memorial Coliseum
3	October 3	at **Green Bay Packers**	**L** 14–23	0–3	Lambeau Field
4	October 10	**Los Angeles Rams**	**W** 31–6	1–3	Wrigley Field
5	October 17	at **Minnesota Vikings**	**W** 45–37	2–3	Metropolitan Stadium
6	October 24	**Detroit Lions**	**W** 38–10	3–3	Wrigley Field
7	October 31	**Green Bay Packers**	**W** 31–10	4–3	Wrigley Field
8	November 7	**Baltimore Colts**	**L** 21–26	4–4	Wrigley Field
9	November 14	St. Louis Cardinals	**W** 34–13	5–4	Wrigley Field
10	November 21	at **Detroit Lions**	**W** 17–10	6–4	Tiger Stadium
11	November 28	at New York Giants	**W** 35–14	7–4	Yankee Stadium
12	December 5	at **Baltimore Colts**	**W** 13–0	8–4	Memorial Stadium
13	December 12	**San Francisco 49ers**	**W** 61–20	9–4	Wrigley Field
14	December 19	**Minnesota Vikings**	**L** 17–24	9–5	Wrigley Field
Note: Intra-conference opponents are in **bold** text.

=== Game summaries ===
==== Week 1 ====
Team	1	2	3	4	Total
Bears	3	0	0	21	24
• 49ers	0	24	21	7	52

- Date: September 19
- Location: Kezar Stadium

==== Week 2 ====
Team	1	2	3	4	Total
Bears	0	14	14	0	28
• Rams	0	6	3	21	30

- Date: September 26
- Location: Los Angeles Memorial Coliseum

==== Week 3 ====
Team	1	2	3	4	Total
Bears	0	0	7	7	14
• Packers	14	6	3	0	23

- Date: October 3
- Location: Lambeau Field

==== Week 4 ====
Team	1	2	3	4	Total
Rams	0	3	3	0	6
• Bears	0	10	7	14	31

- Date: October 10
- Location: Wrigley Field, Chicago, IL
- Game weather: 55 °F (12.8 °C); wind 8 miles per hour (13 km/h; 7.0 kn)

Scoring summary
Q2	CHI	Livingston 3-yard run (LeClerc kick)	CHI 7–0
Q2	CHI	LeClerc 26-yard field goal	CHI 10–0
Q2	LA	Gossett 16-yard field goal	CHI 10–3
Q3	LA	Gossett 13-yard field goal	CHI 10–6
Q3	CHI	Sayers 80-yard pass from Bukich (LeClerc kick)	CHI 17–6
Q4	CHI	Bukich 1-yard run (LeClerc kick)	CHI 24–6
Q4	CHI	Gordon 26-yard pass from Bukich (LeClerc kick)	CHI 31–6

- Rudy Bukich 16/22, 299 Yds

==== Week 5 ====
Team	1	2	3	4	Total
• Bears	14	3	7	21	45
Vikings	0	13	10	14	37

- Date: October 17
- Location: Metropolitan Stadium, Bloomington, MN
- Game weather: 65 °F (18.3 °C); wind 12 miles per hour (19 km/h; 10 kn)

Scoring summary
Q1	CHI	Bull 33-yard run (LeClerc kick)	CHI 7–0
Q1	CHI	Morris 14-yard pass from Bukich (LeClerc kick)	CHI 14–0
Q2	MIN	Cox 38-yard field goal	CHI 14–3
Q2	MIN	Mason 4-yard run (Cox kick)	CHI 14–10
Q2	CHI	LeClerc 12-yard field goal	CHI 17–10
Q2	MIN	Cox 40-yard field goal	CHI 17–13
Q3	MIN	Cox 28-yard field goal	CHI 17–16
Q3	MIN	Brown 40-yard run (Cox kick)	MIN 23–17
Q3	CHI	Sayers 18-yard pass from Bukich (LeClerc kick)	CHI 24–23
Q4	MIN	Tarkenton 2-yard run (Cox kick)	MIN 30–24
Q4	CHI	Sayers 25-yard pass from Bukich (LeClerc kick)	CHI 31–30
Q4	MIN	Mason 4-yard run (Cox kick)	MIN 37–31
Q4	CHI	Sayers 96-yard kickoff return (LeClerc kick)	CHI 38–37
Q4	CHI	Sayers 10-yard run (LeClerc kick)	CHI 45–37

- Gale Sayers 297 all-purpose Yds

==== Week 6 ====
Team	1	2	3	4	Total
Lions	0	3	0	7	10
• Bears	10	14	7	7	38

- Date: October 24
- Location: Wrigley Field

==== Week 7 ====
Team	1	2	3	4	Total
Packers	7	3	0	0	10
• **Bears**	0	17	7	7	31

- Date: October 31
- Location: Wrigley Field, Chicago, Illinois
- Game weather: 57 °F (13.9 °C) • Wind 14 miles per hour (23 km/h; 12 kn)

Scoring summary
1	GB	Jim Taylor 1-yard run (Don Chandler kick)	Packers 7–0
2	CHI	Roger LeClerc 24-yard field goal	Packers 7–3
2	CHI	Jimmy Jones 13-yard pass from Rudy Bukich (Roger LeClerc kick)	Bears 10–7
2	CHI	Gale Sayers 10-yard run (Roger LeClerc kick)	Bears 17–7
2	GB	Don Chandler 43-yard field goal	Bears 17–10
3	CHI	Jon Arnett 2-yard run (Roger LeClerc kick)	Bears 24–10
4	CHI	Ronnie Bull 4-yard run (Roger LeClerc kick)	Bears 31–10

==== Week 8 ====
Team	1	2	3	4	Total
• Colts	0	10	14	2	26
Bears	0	0	7	14	21

- Date: November 7
- Location: Wrigley Field

==== Week 9 ====
Team	1	2	3	4	Total
Cardinals	7	6	0	0	13
• Bears	10	0	7	17	34

- Date: November 14
- Location: Wrigley Field

==== Week 10 ====
Team	1	2	3	4	Total
• Bears	0	10	7	0	17
Lions	7	3	0	0	10

- Date: November 21
- Location: Tiger Stadium

==== Week 11 ====
Team	1	2	3	4	Total
• Bears	7	14	0	14	35
Giants	0	0	7	7	14

- Date: November 28
- Location: Yankee Stadium

==== Week 12 ====
Team	1	2	3	4	Total
• Bears	7	3	3	0	13
Colts	0	0	0	0	0

- Date: December 5
- Location: Memorial Stadium

==== Week 13 ====
Week Thirteen: San Francisco 49ers (7–5) at Chicago Bears (8–4)

Quarter	1	2	3	4	Total
49ers	0	13	0	7	**20**
Bears	13	14	13	21	**61**

at Wrigley Field • Chicago, Illinois

- Date: December 12
- Game weather: 54 °F (12.2 °C) • Wind 11 miles per hour (18 km/h; 9.6 kn)

Game information

49ers

- John Brodie
  19/37, 250 Yds, 2 TD, INT
- Ken Willard
  10 Rush, 24 Yds
- Dave Parks
  9 Rec, 129 Yds, TD

Bears

- Rudy Bukich
  16/32, 247 Yds, 3 TD
- Gale Sayers
  9 Rush, 114 Yds, 4 TD
- Jimmy Jones
  3 Rec, 113 Yds, TD

Gale Sayers' Six Touchdown Game. His last touchdown came on a 85-yard punt return.

Scoring summary

Quarter	Time	Drive			Team	Scoring information	Score	
Quarter	Time	Plays	Yards	TOP	Team	Scoring information	SF	CHI
1					Bears	Gale Sayers 80-yard touchdown reception from Rudy Bukich, 2-point pass failed	0	6
1					Bears	Mike Ditka 29-yard touchdown reception from Rudy Bukich, Roger LeClerc kick good	0	13
2					49ers	Dave Parks 9-yard touchdown reception from John Brodie, Tommy Davis kick good	7	13
2					Bears	Gale Sayers 21-yard touchdown run, Roger LeClerc kick good	7	20
2					49ers	John David Crow 15-yard touchdown reception from John Brodie, Tommy Davis kick no good	13	20
2					Bears	Gale Sayers 7-yard touchdown run, Roger LeClerc kick good	13	27
3					Bears	Gale Sayers 50-yard touchdown run, Roger LeClerc kick good	13	34
3					Bears	Gale Sayers 1-yard touchdown run, 2-point run failed	13	40
4					49ers	Dave Kopay 2-yard touchdown run, Tommy Davis kick good	20	40
4					Bears	Jimmy Jones 8-yard touchdown reception from Rudy Bukich, Roger LeClerc kick good	20	47
4					Bears	Punt returned 85 yards for touchdown by Gale Sayers, Roger LeClerc kick good	20	54
4					Bears	Jon Arnett 2-yard touchdown run, Roger LeClerc kick good	20	61
"TOP" = time of possession. For other American football terms, see Glossary of American football.							20	61

==== Week 14 ====
Team	1	2	3	4	Total
• Vikings	0	0	3	21	24
Bears	0	0	7	10	17

- Date: December 19
- Location: Wrigley Field

== Standings ==
NFL Western Conference
	W	L	T	PCT	CONF	PF	PA	STK
Green Bay Packers	10	3	1	.769	8–3–1	316	224	T1
Baltimore Colts	10	3	1	.769	8–3–1	389	284	W1
Chicago Bears	9	5	0	.643	7–5	409	275	L1
San Francisco 49ers	7	6	1	.538	6–5–1	421	402	T1
Minnesota Vikings	7	7	0	.500	5–7	383	403	W2
Detroit Lions	6	7	1	.462	4–7–1	257	295	W1
Los Angeles Rams	4	10	0	.286	2–10	269	328	L1

Note: Tie games were not officially counted in the standings until 1972.

== Awards and records ==
- Gale Sayers, NFL rookie record, most touchdowns in one season (22)
- Gale Sayers, NFL record (tied), most touchdowns in one game (6)
- Gale Sayers, club record, most touchdowns in one game (6)
