= 1965 NFL Championship Game =

Coordinates: 44.501°N 88.062°W

Cleveland Browns (Eastern) (11–3)	Green Bay Packers (Western) (10–3–1)
12	23
Head coach: Blanton Collier	Head coach: Vince Lombardi
	1	2	3	4	Total
CLE	9	3	0	0	12
GB	7	6	7	3	23
- Date: January 2, 1966
- Stadium: Lambeau Field; Green Bay, Wisconsin
- MVP: Jim Taylor (Fullback; Green Bay)
- Favorite: Green Bay
- Referee: George Rennix
- Attendance: 50,852

TV in the United States
- Network: CBS
- Announcers: Ray Scott, Ken Coleman, Frank Gifford
- Nielsen ratings: 30.5

Radio in the United States
- Network: CBS
- Announcers: Jack Drees; Jim Morse

Location in the United States
Location in Wisconsin

The 1965 NFL Championship Game was the 33rd championship game for the National Football League (NFL), played on January 2, 1966, at Lambeau Field in Green Bay, Wisconsin. This was the first NFL championship game played in January, as well as the first televised in color and the last played prior to the Super Bowl era. It would be staged four more times as a qualifier for the Super Bowl before being replaced with the NFC championship game post-merger.

The game matched the Eastern Conference champion Cleveland Browns (11–3), the defending NFL champions, and the Green Bay Packers (10–3–1) of the Western Conference. A week earlier, the Packers defeated the Baltimore Colts in a tiebreaker Western Conference playoff at Lambeau Field, while the Browns were idle. The Packers were making their first appearance in the championship game in three years, since their consecutive wins in 1961 and 1962. Green Bay was relegated to the third place Playoff Bowl the previous two seasons, with a victory over the Browns and a loss to the St. Louis Cardinals.

The home field for the NFL title game alternated between the conferences; in odd-numbered seasons, the Western team was the host. Home field advantage was not implemented in the NFL playoffs until 1975.

With the 23–12 victory, the Packers won their ninth NFL title, sixth in the championship game era.

As of 2026, this is Cleveland's most recent appearance in an official NFL championship game. The only team with a longer title game appearance drought are the Detroit Lions, who last played for the championship in 1957, eight years before Cleveland's last appearance.

== Game-day preparations ==
The Packers, coached by Vince Lombardi, featured Bart Starr, Paul Hornung, Jim Taylor, and Carroll Dale on offense, along with linemen Jerry Kramer, Forrest Gregg, Bob Skoronski, and Fuzzy Thurston. Defensively, Green Bay showcased Herb Adderley, Ray Nitschke, Willie Davis, Willie Wood, and Dave Robinson.

Cleveland, coached by Blanton Collier, had Jim Brown, WR's Gary Collins, Paul Warfield, guard Gene Hickerson and kicker Lou "The Toe" Groza on offense. Cleveland's defense however, during the regular season, allowed an average of 23.2 points and twice gave up 40+ points in losses to the lowly Cardinals and Rams.^{1}

Despite a heavy snowstorm that blanketed the field, 50,777 hardy fans showed up in 26 °F (−3 °C) weather. A tarp covered the field until shortly before kickoff and a moderated wind of 12 mph (19 km/h) blew through Lambeau field.^{3 4 7} Intermittent rain fell during the game, later turning to light snow. The field initially had a thin covering of snow, but soon turned to mud for most of the game.

Ticket prices for the game were ten and twelve dollars.

== Game summary ==
Both teams scored a touchdown and two field goals in the first half. The touchdowns came on the teams' first drive, respectively, with Green Bay staying in front 7–6 after Cleveland failed on its extra-point attempt.

The second field goal for both teams was preceded by an interception — the only turnovers of the game until Frank Ryan threw another interception on the Browns' last possession of the game.

The Packers extended their halftime lead of 13–12 on their first two possessions of the second half — a 90-yard touchdown drive capped by a Paul Hornung run and a fourth-quarter field goal by Don Chandler, accounting for the final score of 23–12.

Cleveland's best scoring opportunity of the second half came on a deep pass into the end zone intended for Jim Brown — the third passing attempt of that kind by Frank Ryan in the game — and a missed field-goal attempt.

=== First quarter ===
Tom Moore returned the opening kickoff to the Green Bay 23-yard line and the Packers wasted no time in moving the ball as Bart Starr, who had bruised ribs tightly taped, mixed running plays to Jim Taylor and Paul Hornung with short passes to both backs. After a Taylor 6-yard run up the middle to the Cleveland 47, Starr faked to Hornung and lofted a pass to Carroll Dale at the Cleveland 18. Starr slipped as he threw the ball but Cleveland's DB Walter Beach slid on the tricky surface while Dale kept his footing, adjusted to the underthrown ball and galloped into the end zone amid the frenzied cheers of the Green Bay faithful. Don Chandler's kick put GB in front, 7–0.

Cleveland took possession and immediately turned to Jim Brown. However instead of running, Brown circled out of the backfield and turned towards the right sideline where Frank Ryan hit him with a 30-yard pass despite good defense by linebacker Dave Robinson. Ryan continued passing hitting Warfield over the middle for 19 yards and Gary Collins on a square-out pattern near the right corner of the end zone for 17 yards and a touchdown. Green Bay fans responded by pelting Collins with snowballs. On the extra-point attempt, holder Bobby Franklin fumbled the snap, and Cleveland's kicker Lou Groza, who did not miss an extra point all year, picked up the errant ball and passed to Franklin. However Green Bay's Willie Wood promptly tackled him at the 5-yard line, keeping Green Bay ahead, 7–6.

After a short punt gave the Browns possession in Green Bay territory, Ryan passed to Warfield for 11 yards and Jim Brown ran for 5 more. On the play Brown jumped to the outside when he found the middle awash in green and gold jerseys. Green Bay's strategy throughout the game would be to clog the middle forcing Brown to hesitate while looking for room to run. Brown took extra steps to cut on the wet field thus giving the GB defense time to catch up. On 3rd down and 2, Ryan, instead of handing off to Brown, crossed up the defense and sent Warfield to the Post. Warfield beat safety Tom Brown and CB Doug Hart to the goal line but the ball was slightly overthrown and eluded Warfield's outstretched hands. On 4th down Lou Groza, the 41-year-old 6-foot 1-inch, 240 lb lineman whose career extended all the way back to the A.A.F.C., coolly kicked a 24-yard field goal to put Cleveland in front, 9–7.

After the Packers took over on their own 23, Taylor was tackled for a yard loss. Starr attempted a pass to Hornung and the Browns were flagged for defensive holding, resulting in a first down at the Green Bay 27. Jerry Kramer escorted Paul Hornung around left end on the Packers sweep, picking up 34 yards. Bart Starr passed to Boyd Dowler for 11 yards and Taylor gained 7 off tackle. Taylor made a first down at the 17. Hornung gained four yards on a sweep, this time led by Fuzzy Thurston. Taylor gained four and another run by Hornung gave Green Bay a first down at the Cleveland 6 as the first quarter ended.

=== Second quarter ===
Taylor gained 3, but Cleveland's defense stuffed Hornung and then sacked Starr. Don Chandler kicked a 15-yard field goal, making it 10–9, GB.

With 7:42 left in the 2nd period, and Jim Brown unable to make headway, Cleveland's Frank Ryan again attempted to go deep to Warfield. The speedy Warfield, who had been sidelined by injury and caught only 3 passes all year, was now covered by GB defensive back Bob Jeter, replacing Doug Hart. Jeter's speed enabled him to keep up with Warfield and he batted away Ryan's pass at the Cleveland 43. On 3rd down and 10, Ryan threw a quick pass to Leroy Kelly who was streaking up the right sideline. The ball was underthrown and GB's Willie Wood made a spectacular play tipping the ball to himself and returning the interception to the Cleveland 9 yard-line. Helped by a motion penalty against Paul Hornung (who misheard the snap count in the huddle), Cleveland's defense rose to the occasion and held the Packers to a 23-yard field goal by Chandler, extending the Packer lead to 13–9.

With the clock winding down, Cleveland took over on their own 16 yard line. Field conditions were rapidly deteriorating, as Frank Ryan sent Jim Brown around left end on Cleveland's own version of the sweep and Brown tip-toed his way for 9 yards. Ryan then sent Brown sweeping around the right end. Cleveland's HOF guard Gene Hickerson led the way giving Brown room to find good footing and sprint down the sideline for 15 yards. After an incomplete pass and the middle of the field turning into a quagmire, Ryan sent Brown on a pitchout around left end. Brown found good traction near the sideline and picked 8 more yards. On 3rd down Brown again tried sweeping around the right, but the Green Bay defense swarmed over him for a loss, forcing Cleveland to punt.

Green Bay took over deep in their own territory where Bart Starr committed one of the few mistakes of a Lombardi coached team. On 3rd down, Starr faked a run but overthrew Hornung who was open along the left sideline. Walter Beach intercepted, toe tapping the sideline to give Cleveland the ball at the Green Bay 30 yard line. This was the only Green Bay turnover in the game.

Frank Ryan looked downfield but threw incomplete to Collins, double covered at the goal line. Ryan's next pass attempt went awry as Ray Nitschke charged up the middle on a blitz forcing Ryan out of the pocket, where he was sacked by Dave Robinson. Ryan then completed a pass to Brown on the left flat and Brown angled towards the sideline but was stopped at the Green Bay 21 by Nitschke and Jeter, 1 yard short of the first down. Groza's 28-yard field goal sent the teams into halftime at 13–12, GB.

=== Third quarter ===
The second half was dominated by Green Bay as the weather brought more snow, fog, mud, and less wide open play. The Packers' ball control offense began to assert itself.

Cleveland made no headway at the start of the half and punted. Green Bay's Elijah Pitts carried the punt backwards for −10 yards, and the Packers were forced to start from their own 10-yard line. The Packers methodically marched down field as Forrest Gregg, Fuzzy Thurston, Ken Bowman and Jerry Kramer all made room for Taylor and Hornung to run. Hornung carried for 6 yards, Taylor for 8, Taylor left for 7 yards, and Taylor again for a 1st down to the Cleveland 46. A pass was complete to Taylor in the left flat for 10 yards, then Hornung slipped outside the right tackle for 20 yards. After a short gain by Taylor the 11-play, 90 yard drive culminated as Paul Hornung followed Jerry Kramer on a 13-yard TD sweep around left end. The play captured from an end zone ground level camera is on what seems like every Packer highlight reel.^{6} Chandler's point made the score 20–12, GB.

Fog rolled in as Cleveland looked to come back. With a 1st down on their own 31, Ryan scrambled for 8 yards and the Packers' LeRoy Caffey was flagged for a 15-yard face mask penalty, one of only three penalties on the day for the Packers. Jim Brown however was unable to find any running room and Ryan continued to pass, hitting Collins for 11 yards. From the Packer 27 he looked for Brown in the end zone. The pass was catchable but Ray Nitschke made a great effort to stretch and barely knock the wet ball out of Brown's hands. Cleveland would not threaten the goal line the rest of the day. Ryan's next attempt slipped out of his hand. He managed to recover the loose ball and Groza was brought in for the field goal attempt. Henry Jordan however, broke through the Cleveland line and deflected Groza's kick which bounced harmlessly into the end zone.

Starting from the Packer 20, Taylor ran for a yard. Starr's pass to tight end Bill Anderson missed, but on third down Starr hit Carroll Dale who was brought down by Bernie Parrish at the 34. Taylor picked up 4 and 6 yards on two carries for another first down at the GB 44 as the quarter ended.

=== Fourth quarter ===
As the quarter opened, Hornung tried a halfback option pass to Dale that missed at the Cleveland 25. Starr then slipped on the muddy turf as he retreated to pass, but regained his balance and threw a strike to wide open Boyd Dowler over the middle. Dowler was tackled at the Cleveland 38. Taylor ran for 3 yards, 6 yards, then dove for the first down. Frank Gifford remarked on the CBS telecast that Taylor was "running like a demon here today." After another 4 yard gain Taylor went to the sidelines for a breather. The Packer drive stalled at the Cleveland 22-yard line and Chandler kicked his third field goal from 29 yards out, bringing Lombardi and the Packers one step closer to their 3rd championship as a unit.

Cleveland had one last chance when Leroy Kelly took Chandler's ensuing kickoff and promptly angled towards the right sideline. At midfield, Chandler, the kicker, was the last player in Kelly's path. Kelly tried to cut back but Chandler held his ground and dropped Kelly on the muddy turf with an ankle tackle at the Packer 47. With good field position, Cleveland could not move the ball and punted again after Willie Davis sacked Ryan on third down.

The Packers also failed to move the ball, but Chandler was hit by Cleveland's Ralph Smith after punting from the end zone. The roughing penalty gave GB a first down and another opportunity to run down the clock. The Packers continued to run Taylor (27 carries on the day for 96 yds) and Hornung (18 carries for 105 yds) to control the ball and chew up time. After the two minute warning the Packers punted again, and a last minute interception by Herb Adderley at the Packer 26 sealed Cleveland's fate.

== Scoring summary ==
Green Bay Packers 23, Cleveland Browns 12

Quarter	1	2	3	4	Total
Browns	9	3	0	0	12
Packers	7	6	7	3	23

at Lambeau Field, Green Bay, Wisconsin

- Date: January 2, 1966
- Game time: 1:10 p.m. CST
- Game weather: 26 °F (−3 °C), wind 11 mph (18 km/h), wind chill 16 °F (−9 °C), relative humidity 92%
- Game attendance: 50,852
- Referee: George Rennix
- Pro-Football-Reference

Game information

Scoring

- First quarter
  - GB – Carroll Dale 47-yard pass from Bart Starr (Don Chandler kick). Packers 7–0
  - CLE – Collins 17-yard pass from Frank Ryan (American football) (kick failed). Packers 7–6
  - CLE – Lou Groza 24-yard field goal. Browns 9–7
- Second quarter
  - GB – Don Chandler 15-yard field goal. Packers 10–9
  - GB – Don Chandler 23-yard field goal. Packers 13–9
  - CLE – Lou Groza 28-yard field goal. Packers 13–12
- Third quarter
  - GB – Paul Hornung 13-yard run (Chandler kick). Packers 20–12
- Fourth quarter
  - GB – Don Chandler 29-yard field goal. Packers 23–12

Top passers

- CLE – Frank Ryan – 8/18, 115 yards, 1 TD, 2 INT
- GB – Bart Starr – 10/18, 147 yards, 1 TD, 1 INT

Top rushers

- CLE – Jim Brown – 12 rushes, 50 yards
- GB – Paul Hornung – 18 rushes, 105 yards, 1 TD

Top receivers

- CLE – Jim Brown – 3 receptions, 44 yards
- GB – Carroll Dale – 2 receptions, 60 yards, 1 TD

== Officials ==
- Referee: (52) George Rennix
- Umpire: (18) Tony Sacco
- Head linesman: (30) George Murphy
- Line judge: (28) Bill Schleibaum
- Back judge: (29) Stan Javie
- Field judge: (16) Mike Lisetski

- Alternate: Harry Brubaker
- Alternate: Jack Nix

The NFL added a sixth game official in 1965, the line judge. The side judge was added thirteen years later in 1978.

== Players' shares ==
The Packer players each received $7,500 and the Brown players about $4,600 each. This was slightly lower than the previous year, which had a much higher attendance (79,544) in the larger Cleveland Municipal Stadium.

Packer fullback Jim Taylor was named the game's outstanding player by Sport magazine and received a 1966 Chevrolet Corvette. He followed teammates Paul Hornung (1961) and linebacker Ray Nitschke (1962) as winners of the award.

== Vince Lombardi–Jim Brown ==
Vince Lombardi proved to be a master tactician by stressing a ball control offense, assigning middle linebacker Ray Nitschke to shadow running back Jim Brown all day, and switching defensive assignments when wide receiver Paul Warfield was getting open early in the game. The Packers ran the ball 47 times for 204 yards on the day while holding Cleveland to just 38 total offensive plays. Lombardi coached the team to stop Brown and force Cleveland's other players to step up and try to win the game. The strategy worked as the Packers gained twice as many yards from scrimmage as the Browns.

This was Brown's penultimate NFL game (the Pro Bowl, two weeks later, was his last) as he left at the top of his game (nine seasons) to pursue an acting career in Hollywood. He had carried the Browns to the NFL title in 1964 and would have no regrets, despite the fact that he was still a month shy of thirty years old. Brown had a year remaining (1966) on a three-year contract, and officially announced his retirement 6½ months later in mid-July.

== See also ==
- 1965 NFL playoffs
- 1965 NFL season
- History of the NFL championship
- 1965 American Football League Championship Game

== Video ==
- YouTube - 1965 NFL Championship Game - January 2, 1966
