= 1969 St. Louis Cardinals (NFL) season =

American football team season

1969 St. Louis Cardinals season
- Head coach: Charley Winner
- Home stadium: Busch Memorial Stadium

Results
- Record: 4–9–1
- Division place: 3rd NFL Century
- Playoffs: Did not qualify
- Pro Bowlers: T Bob Reynolds; T Ernie McMillan; TE Jackie Smith; LS Jerry Stovall; RS Larry Wilson

The 1969 St. Louis Cardinals season was the 50th season the team was in the National Football League (NFL).

The team failed to improve on their previous output of 9–4–1, winning only four games. They failed to qualify for the playoffs for the 21st consecutive season.

Despite the presence of future Pro Football Hall of Fame inductees Larry Wilson and Roger Wehrli, as well former All-Pro Jerry Stovall, the Cardinals’ defense allowed 38 passing touchdowns, the second-highest total in pro football history.

== Offseason ==
=== NFL draft ===
1969 St. Louis Cardinals draft
Round	Pick	Player	Position	College	Notes
1	19	Roger Wehrli * ^{†}	Cornerback	Missouri	
Made roster † Pro Football Hall of Fame * Made at least one Pro Bowl during career

=== Undrafted free agents ===
1969 undrafted free agents of note
Player	Position	College
David Olivo	Quarterback	Miami (FL)

== Personnel ==
=== Staff / Coaches ===
1969 St. Louis Cardinals staff
Front office: Principal Owner/de facto General Manager - Bill Bidwill; Partial Owner / Team President - Charles Bidwill Jr.; Head coaches: Head Coach – Charley Winner; Offensive coaches: Quarterbacks Coach - Harry Gilmer; Offensive Backs - Red Cochran; Offensive line – Red Miller; Receivers Coach / Game Scouting – Ken Shipp	Defensive coaches: Defensive Coordinator - Chuck Drulis; Linebackers Coach – Don Shroyer; Defensive Line – Dick Voris; Defensive Backs - Chuck Drulis

=== Roster ===
1969 St. Louis Cardinals roster
Quarterbacks: 17 Jim Hart; 12 Charley Johnson; Running backs: 33 Willis Crenshaw; 39 Cid Edwards; 36 MacArthur Lane; 23 Johnny Roland; 27 Roy Shivers; Wide receivers: 31 Jerry Daanen; 44 John Gilliam; 88 Fred Hyatt; 80 Dave Williams; Tight ends: 89 Robert Brown; 81 Jackie Smith	Offensive linemen: 76 Vern Emerson T; 55 Irv Goode G; 61 Bob DeMarco C; 73 Ernie McMillan T; 50 Wayne Mulligan C; 74 Bob Reynolds T; 66 Rick Sortun G; 63 Clyde Williams G/T; Defensive linemen: 70 Rolf Krueger DE; 75 Bob Rowe DT; 82 Joe Schmiesing DT; 87 Cal Snowden DE; 79 Chuck Walker DE	Linebackers: 56 Chip Healy MLB; 60 Dave Meggyesy OLB; 51 Dave Olerich OLB; 53 Jamie Rivers MLB; 34 Rocky Rosema OLB; 67 Larry Stallings OLB; Defensive backs: 48 Bob Atkins CB; 24 Terry Brown SS; 21 Jerry Stovall SS; 22 Roger Wehrli CB; 8 Larry Wilson FS; 41 Nate Wright CB; Special teams: 25 Jim Bakken K; 10 King Hill P	Reserve lists: 86 Don Brumm DE (IR); 64 Ken Gray G (IR); 74 Fred Heron DT (IR); 26 Chuck Latourette P (IR); 42 Lonnie Sanders CB (IR); 11 Jerry Warren K (NF-Inj.); 37 Mike Wilson CB/S (IR); Taxi Squad: 18 David Olivo QB; 32 Phil Rogers WR; 29 Walt Shockley CB; rookies in italics

== Schedule ==
Week	Date	Opponent	Result	Record	Venue	Attendance
1	September 21	at Dallas Cowboys	**L** 3–24	0–1	Cotton Bowl	62,134
2	September 28	Chicago Bears	**W** 20–17	1–1	Busch Memorial Stadium	50,039
3	October 5	at **Pittsburgh Steelers**	**W** 27–14	2–1	Pitt Stadium	45,011
4	October 12	at Washington Redskins	**L** 17–33	2–2	RFK Stadium	50,481
5	October 19	Minnesota Vikings	**L** 10–27	2–3	Busch Memorial Stadium	49,430
6	October 26	at **Cleveland Browns**	**T** 21–21	2–3–1	Cleveland Municipal Stadium	81,186
7	November 2	New Orleans Saints	**L** 42–51	2–4–1	Busch Memorial Stadium	46,718
8	November 9	**New York Giants**	**W** 42–17	3–4–1	Busch Memorial Stadium	49,194
9	November 16	at Detroit Lions	**L** 0–20	3–5–1	Tiger Stadium	51,749
10	November 23	Philadelphia Eagles	**L** 30–34	3–6–1	Busch Memorial Stadium	45,512
11	November 30	**Pittsburgh Steelers**	**W** 47–10	4–6–1	Busch Memorial Stadium	43,721
12	December 7	at **New York Giants**	**L** 6–49	4–7–1	Yankee Stadium	62,973
13	December 14	**Cleveland Browns**	**L** 21–27	4–8–1	Busch Memorial Stadium	44,924
14	December 21	at Green Bay Packers	**L** 28–45	4–9–1	Lambeau Field	50,861
Note: Intra-division opponents are in **bold** text.

== Standings ==
NFL Century
	W	L	T	PCT	DIV	CONF	PF	PA	STK
Cleveland Browns	10	3	1	.769	4–1–1	8–1–1	351	300	L1
New York Giants	6	8	0	.429	4–2	4–6	264	298	W3
St. Louis Cardinals	4	9	1	.308	3–2–1	3–6–1	314	389	L3
Pittsburgh Steelers	1	13	0	.071	0–6	0–10	218	404	L13

Note: Tie games were not officially counted in the standings until 1972.
