= 1969 All-Pro Team =

Official list of the best professional football players in 1969

This is a list of players named as All-Pros based on their performance in the 1969 AFL and NFL season. These lists provide a perspective into how players were judged against their peers by critics of their time. Players representing both the National Football League (NFL) and American Football League (AFL) are included.

== Selectors ==
Teams were selected by several publications and wire services: the Associated Press (AP), the Pro Football Hall of Fame (HoF), the Newspaper Enterprise Association (NEA), the New York Daily News (NYDN), Pro Football Weekly (PFW), the Pro Football Writers of America (PFWA), the Sporting News (SN) and the United Press International (UPI).

The Hall of Fame and PFWA each selected a true "All-Pro" team which included players from both the NFL and AFL. The AP, Daily News and UPI all selected one team for each league, which are referred to as "All-NFL" and "All-AFL" teams. The NEA and Pro Football Weekly each named both a unified All-Pro team as well as All-NFL and All-AFL teams representing each of the leagues individually. The Sporting News named a single All-AFL team and All-Conference teams representing each of the two NFL conferences.

All of the publications named both first-team and second-team performers, with the exception of Pro Football Weekly and the Sporting News, which only selected only a first-team.

== NFL All-Pros ==
Eight NFL players were named to the first-team of every list presented here: Lem Barney, Bob Brown, Dick Butkus, Carl Eller, Deacon Jones, David Lee, Gale Sayers and Mick Tingelhoff.

Offense
Position	First team	Second team
Quarterback	Roman Gabriel, Los Angeles Rams (AP, HoF, NYDN, PFW-NFL, SN, UPI)	Sonny Jurgensen, Washington Redskins (AP-2, NEA, NYDN, UPI)
Halfback	Calvin Hill, Dallas Cowboys (AP, HoF, NYDN, PFW-NFL, PFWA, SN, UPI); Tom Matte, Baltimore Colts (SN); Gale Sayers, Chicago Bears (AP, HoF, NEA, NEA-NFL, NYDN, PFW, PFW-NFL, PFWA, SN, UPI)	Calvin Hill, Dallas Cowboys (NEA, NEA-NFL); Tom Matte, Baltimore Colts (NEA-NFL)
Fullback	Leroy Kelly, Cleveland Browns (NEA, NEA-NFL); Tom Woodeshick, Philadelphia Eagles (NYDN)	Leroy Kelly, Cleveland Browns (AP, HoF, NYDN, PFWA, UPI); Tom Woodeshick, Philadelphia Eagles (AP, UPI)
End/ Flanker/ Split End	Danny Abramowicz, New Orleans Saints (AP^{[t]}, SN); Gary Collins, Cleveland Browns (AP, UPI); Roy Jefferson, Pittsburgh Steelers (AP^{[t]}, NEA-NFL, NYDN, SN, UPI); Paul Warfield, Cleveland Browns (HoF, NEA, NEA-NFL, PFW-NFL); Gene Washington, Minnesota Vikings (NYDN, PFW-NFL, SN); Gene A. Washington, San Francisco 49ers (SN)	Danny Abramowicz, New Orleans Saints (NYDN, UPI); Gary Collins, Cleveland Browns (PFWA); Lance Rentzel, Dallas Cowboys (AP, NEA-NFL); Charley Taylor, Washington Redskins (NEA, NEA-NFL); Paul Warfield, Cleveland Browns (PFWA, NYDN); Gene Washington, Minnesota Vikings (AP, UPI)
Tight end	Charlie Sanders, Detroit Lions (SN); Jerry Smith, Washington Redskins (AP, NEA, NEA-NFL, NYDN, PFW-NFL, PFWA, SN, UPI)	Charlie Sanders, Detroit Lions (AP, HoF, UPI); Jackie Smith, St. Louis Cardinals (NEA, NEA-NFL, NYDN)
Tackle	Grady Alderman, Minnesota Vikings (SN^{[t]}); Bob Brown, Los Angeles Rams (AP, HoF, NEA, NEA-NFL, NYDN, PFW, PFW-NFL, PFWA, SN, UPI); Ralph Neely, Dallas Cowboys (AP, NEA-NFL, NYDN, PFW-NFL, SN, UPI); Dick Schafrath, Cleveland Browns (SN); Bob Vogel, Baltimore Colts (SN^{[t]})	Grady Alderman, Minnesota Vikings (AP, NEA-NFL, PFWA, UPI); Charley Cowan, Los Angeles Rams (AP); Ernie McMillan, St. Louis Cardinals (NYDN); Ralph Neely, Dallas Cowboys (HoF, NEA, PFWA); Len Rohde, San Francisco 49ers (NEA-NFL); Bob Vogel, Baltimore Colts (NYDN, UPI)
Guard	Gale Gillingham, Green Bay Packers (AP, NEA-NFL, SN); Ken Gray, St. Louis Cardinals (SN); Gene Hickerson, Cleveland Browns (AP, HoF, NYDN, PFW, PFW-NFL, SN, UPI); Tom Mack, Los Angeles Rams (NEA-NFL, SN, UPI); John Niland, Dallas Cowboys (AP, HoF, NYDN, PFW)	Gale Gillingham, Green Bay Packers (HoF, NEA, UPI); Gene Hickerson, Cleveland Browns (NEA-NFL); Tom Mack, Los Angeles Rams (AP, HoF, NEA, NYDN, PFWA); John Niland, Dallas Cowboys (NEA-NFL, UPI); George Seals, Chicago Bears (NYDN)
Center	Bob DeMarco, St. Louis Cardinals (SN); Mick Tingelhoff, Minnesota Vikings (AP, HoF, NEA, NEA-NFL, NYDN, PFW, PFW-NFL, PFWA, SN, UPI)	Bill Curry, Baltimore Colts (AP, UPI); Ed Flanagan, Detroit Lions (NEA-NFL); Ken Iman, Los Angeles Rams (NYDN)

Special teams
Position	First team	Second team
Kicker	Fred Cox, Minnesota Vikings (PFW-NFL, SN); Tom Dempsey, New Orleans Saints (SN)	no publications named a second-team kicker
Punter	David Lee, Baltimore Colts (HoF, NEA, PFW-NFL, PFWA, SN); Ron Widby, Dallas Cowboys (SN)	Ron Widby, Dallas Cowboys (PFWA)

Defense
Position	First team	Second team
Defensive end	George Andrie, Dallas Cowboys (SN); Carl Eller, Minnesota Vikings (AP, HoF, NEA, NEA-NFL, NYDN, PFW, PFW-NFL, PFWA, SN, UPI); Deacon Jones, Los Angeles Rams (AP, HoF, NEA, NEA-NFL, NYDN, PFW, PFW-NFL, PFWA, SN, UPI); Ron Snidow, Cleveland Browns (SN^{[t]}); Chuck Walker, St. Louis Cardinals (SN^{[t]})	George Andrie, Dallas Cowboys (UPI); Jack Gregory, Cleveland Browns (NYDN); Claude Humphrey, Atlanta Falcons (AP, NEA-NFL); Jim Marshall, Minnesota Vikings (AP, NEA, NEA-NFL, SN, UPI)
Defensive tackle	Bob Lilly, Dallas Cowboys (AP, HoF, NEA, NEA-NFL, NYDN, PFW-NFL, PFWA, SN); Merlin Olsen, Los Angeles Rams (AP, HoF, NEA, NEA-NFL, NYDN, PFW, PFW-NFL, PFWA, SN, UPI); Alan Page, Minnesota Vikings (SN, UPI)	Joe Greene, Pittsburgh Steelers (SN, NYDN); Alex Karras, Detroit Lions (AP, NEA-NFL, UPI); Bob Lilly, Dallas Cowboys (UPI); Alan Page, Minnesota Vikings (AP, HoF, NEA, NEA-NFL, NYDN, PFWA)
Middle linebacker	Dick Butkus, Chicago Bears (AP, SN, PFWA, HoF, NEA, NYDN, PFW, UPI)	Mike Curtis, Baltimore Colts (AP, SN); Lee Roy Jordan, Dallas Cowboys (AP, SN); Mike Lucci, Detroit Lions (NEA, NYDN, UPI); Ray Nitschke, Green Bay Packers (PFWA)
Outside linebacker	Chuck Howley, Dallas Cowboys (AP, SN, HoF, NEA, NYDN, PFW, UPI); Maxie Baughan, Los Angeles Rams (AP); Chris Hanburger, Washington Redskins (AP); Dave Robinson, Green Bay Packers (SN, NEA, NYDN, PFW, UPI)	Maxie Baughan, Los Angeles Rams (SN, NEA); Chris Hanburger, Washington Redskins (NEA, NYDN, UPI); Chuck Howley, Dallas Cowboys (PFWA); Dave Robinson, Green Bay Packers (HoF, PFWA); Dave Wilcox, San Francisco 49ers (NYDN, UPI)
Cornerback	Herb Adderley, Green Bay Packers (AP, PFW-NFL); Lem Barney, Detroit Lions (AP, HoF, NEA, NEA-NFL, NYDN, PFW, PFW-NFL, PFWA, SN, UPI); Bobby Bryant, Minnesota Vikings (NYDN); Pat Fischer, Washington Redskins (SN); Cornell Green, Dallas Cowboys (SN, UPI); Jimmy Johnson, San Francisco 49ers (NEA-NFL, SN)	Herb Adderley, Green Bay Packers (HoF, NYDN, PFWA); Bobby Bryant, Minnesota Vikings (AP, NEA, NEA-NFL, UPI); Cornell Green, Dallas Cowboys (AP, NEA-NFL); Jimmy Johnson, San Francisco 49ers (HoF, NEA, NYDN, PFWA, UPI)
Safety	Eddie Meador, Los Angeles Rams (AP, NEA-NFL, NYDN, PFW-NFL, SN); Mel Renfro, Dallas Cowboys (NEA, NEA-NFL, PFW, PFW-NFL, SN); Larry Wilson, St. Louis Cardinals (AP, HoF, NEA-NFL, NYDN, PFWA, SN, UPI); Willie Wood, Green Bay Packers (SN)	Mike Howell, Cleveland Browns (UPI); Karl Kassulke, Minnesota Vikings (UPI); Ernie Kellermann, Cleveland Browns (NYDN); Paul Krause, Minnesota Vikings (AP); Eddie Meador, Los Angeles Rams (PFWA); Mel Renfro, Dallas Cowboys (AP, HoF, NYDN, PFWA); Rick Volk, Baltimore Colts (NEA-NFL); Larry Wilson, St. Louis Cardinals (NEA-NFL); Willie Wood, Green Bay Packers (NEA-NFL)

=== Key (NFL) ===
- AP = Associated Press All-NFL team
- HoF = Pro Football Hall of Fame All-Pro team
- NEA = Newspaper Enterprise Association All-Pro team
- NEA-NFL = Newspaper Enterprise Association All-NFL team
- NYDN = New York Daily News All-NFL team
- PFW = Pro Football Weekly All-Pro team
- PFW-NFL = Pro Football Weekly All-NFL team
- PFWA = Pro Football Writers of America All-Pro team
- SN = Sporting News All-Conference team
- UPI = United Press International All-NFL team

^{t} denotes a tie in balloting

== AFL All-Pros ==
Two AFL players were named to the first-team of every list presented here: Bobby Bell and Willie Brown.

Offense
Position	First team	Second team
Quarterback	Daryle Lamonica, Oakland Raiders (AP, PFW-AFL, PFWA, SN, UPI); Joe Namath, New York Jets (NEA, NEA-AFL, NYDN)	Daryle Lamonica, Oakland Raiders (HoF, NEA-AFL, NYDN); Joe Namath, New York Jets (AP, SN, UPI)
Halfback	Floyd Little, Denver Broncos (AP, NEA-AFL, NYDN, PFW-AFL, SN, UPI)	Carl Garrett, Boston Patriots (NEA-AFL); Mike Garrett, Kansas City Chiefs (NEA-AFL); Floyd Little, Denver Broncos (HoF, PFWA); Dickie Post, San Diego Chargers (AP, NYDN, SN, UPI)
Fullback	Matt Snell, New York Jets (AP, NEA-AFL, NYDN, PFW, PFW-AFL, SN, UPI)	Jim Nance, Boston Patriots (AP, NYDN, SN, UPI); Matt Snell, New York Jets (NEA)
Flanker/ Split End	Lance Alworth, San Diego Chargers (NEA-AFL, PFW, PFW-AFL, PFWA, SN, UPI); Fred Biletnikoff, Oakland Raiders (AP, NEA-AFL, NYDN, PFW, PFW-AFL, PFWA, SN); Don Maynard, New York Jets (AP, HoF, NYDN, PFWA); Warren Wells, Oakland Raiders (UPI)	Lance Alworth, San Diego Chargers (AP, HoF, NEA, NYDN); Fred Biletnikoff, Oakland Raiders (HoF, NEA, UPI); Al Denson, Denver Broncos (NYDN, SN); Don Maynard, New York Jets (NEA-AFL, SN, UPI); Warren Wells, Oakland Raiders (AP, NEA-AFL)
Tight end	Alvin Reed, Houston Oilers (SN); Bob Trumpy, Cincinnati Bengals (AP, HoF, NEA-AFL, NYDN, PFW, PFW-AFL, UPI)	Alvin Reed, Houston Oilers (AP, NEA-AFL, NYDN, UPI); Bob Trumpy, Cincinnati Bengals (PFWA, SN)
Tackle	Winston Hill, New York Jets (NEA-AFL, NYDN, SN); Harry Schuh, Oakland Raiders (AP, PFW-AFL, UPI); Jim Tyrer, Kansas City Chiefs (AP, HoF, NEA-AFL, NYDN, PFW, PFW-AFL, PFWA, SN, UPI)	Dave Hill, Kansas City Chiefs (SN); Winston Hill, New York Jets (AP, UPI); Harry Schuh, Oakland Raiders (HoF, NEA-AFL, NYDN, SN); Walt Suggs, Houston Oilers (AP, NEA-AFL, NYDN, UPI); Jim Tyrer, Kansas City Chiefs (NEA)
Guard	Ed Budde, Kansas City Chiefs (AP, NEA, NEA-AFL, NYDN, PFW-AFL, SN); Walt Sweeney, San Diego Chargers (NEA, NEA-AFL, PFW, PFW-AFL, UPI); Gene Upshaw, Oakland Raiders (AP, NYDN, PFWA, SN, UPI)	Sonny Bishop, Houston Oilers (SN); Ed Budde, Kansas City Chiefs (PFWA, UPI); Dave Herman, New York Jets (NYDN, UPI); Mo Moorman, Kansas City Chiefs (AP, SN); Billy Shaw, Buffalo Bills (NEA-AFL); Walt Sweeney, San Diego Chargers (AP, NYDN); Gene Upshaw, Oakland Raiders (HoF, NEA-AFL)
Center	Jim Otto, Oakland Raiders (AP, NEA-AFL, NYDN, PFW, SN, UPI)	E. J. Holub, Kansas City Chiefs (AP^{[t]}); Jon Morris, Boston Patriots (AP^{[t]}, NEA-AFL); Jim Otto, Oakland Raiders (HoF, NEA, PFWA); John Schmitt, New York Jets (AP^{[t]}, NYDN, SN, UPI)

Special teams
Position	First team	Second team
Kicker	Jan Stenerud, Kansas City Chiefs (HoF, NEA, PFW-AFL, SN); Jim Turner, New York Jets (PFWA)	Jan Stenerud, Kansas City Chiefs (PFWA); Jim Turner, New York Jets (HoF, SN)
Punter	Paul Maguire, Buffalo Bills (PFW-AFL); Dennis Partee, San Diego Chargers (SN)	Paul Maguire, Buffalo Bills (HoF); Larry Seiple, Miami Dolphins (SN)

Defense
Position	First team	Second team
Defensive end	Rich Jackson, Denver Broncos (AP, NEA-AFL, NYDN, PFW-AFL, SN, UPI); Ron McDole, Buffalo Bills (NEA-AFL); Gerry Philbin, New York Jets (AP, NYDN, PFW-AFL, SN, UPI)	Elvin Bethea, Houston Oilers (UPI); Aaron Brown, Kansas City Chiefs (NYDN, SN); Steve DeLong, San Diego Chargers (NEA-AFL); Rich Jackson, Denver Broncos (HoF, NEA, PFWA); Ike Lassiter, Oakland Raiders (AP, NYDN, UPI); Jerry Mays, Kansas City Chiefs (AP, SN); Gerry Philbin, New York Jets (HoF, NEA-AFL, PFWA)
Defensive tackle	Houston Antwine, Boston Patriots (SN); Buck Buchanan, Kansas City Chiefs (AP, NYDN, PFW, PFW-AFL, SN, UPI); John Elliott, New York Jets (AP, NEA-AFL, NYDN, PFW-AFL, UPI); Tom Keating, Oakland Raiders (NEA-AFL)	Houston Antwine, Boston Patriots (AP); Buck Buchanan, Kansas City Chiefs (HoF, NEA-AFL); Dave Costa, Denver Broncos (SN, UPI); Jim Dunaway, Buffalo Bills (NEA-AFL, NYDN); John Elliott, New York Jets (PFWA, SN); Tom Keating, Oakland Raiders (AP, NEA, NYDN, UPI)
Middle linebacker	Nick Buoniconti, Miami Dolphins (AP, NEA-AFL, UPI); Dan Conners, Oakland Raiders (SN); Willie Lanier, Kansas City Chiefs (NYDN, PFW-AFL)	Nick Buoniconti, Miami Dolphins (SN^{[t]}); Dan Conners, Oakland Raiders (AP, NYDN); Willie Lanier, Kansas City Chiefs (HoF, NEA-AFL, SN^{[t]}, UPI)
Outside linebacker	Bobby Bell, Kansas City Chiefs (AP, HoF, NEA, NEA-AFL, NYDN, PFW, PFW-AFL, PFWA, SN, UPI); George Webster, Houston Oilers (AP, NEA-AFL, NYDN, PFW-AFL, PFWA, SN, UPI)	Pete Barnes, San Diego Chargers (AP^{[t]}); Larry Grantham, New York Jets (NYDN, SN, UPI); Jim Lynch, Kansas City Chiefs (AP, NEA-AFL, UPI); Gus Otto, Oakland Raiders (AP^{[t]}, SN); Mike Stratton, Buffalo Bills (NEA-AFL, NYDN); George Webster, Houston Oilers (HoF, NEA)
Cornerback	Willie Brown, Oakland Raiders (AP, HoF, NEA, NEA-AFL, NYDN, PFW, PFW-AFL, PFWA, SN, UPI); Butch Byrd, Buffalo Bills (AP, NEA-AFL, NYDN, PFW-AFL, UPI); Miller Farr, Houston Oilers (SN)	Butch Byrd, Buffalo Bills (SN); Booker Edgerson, Buffalo Bills (NYDN, UPI); Miller Farr, Houston Oilers (AP, NEA-AFL, NYDN, UPI); Emmitt Thomas, Kansas City Chiefs (SN); Bill Thompson, Denver Broncos (AP, NEA-AFL)
Safety	Dave Grayson, Oakland Raiders (AP, NEA, NEA-AFL, PFW, PFW-AFL, PFWA, SN, UPI); Ken Houston, Houston Oilers (NYDN); Johnny Robinson, Kansas City Chiefs (AP, HoF, NEA-AFL, NYDN, PFW-AFL, SN, UPI)	George Atkinson, Oakland Raiders (NEA-AFL); Kenny Graham, San Diego Chargers (AP, NYDN, SP, UPI); Dave Grayson, Oakland Raiders (HoF, NYDN); Ken Houston, Houston Oilers (AP, NEA-AFL, SN, UPI); Johnny Robinson, Kansas City Chiefs (NEA)

=== Key (AFL) ===
- AP = Associated Press All-AFL team
- HoF = Pro Football Hall of Fame All-Pro team
- NEA = Newspaper Enterprise Association All-Pro team
- NEA-AFL = Newspaper Enterprise Association All-AFL team
- NYDN = New York Daily News All-AFL team
- PFW = Pro Football Weekly All-Pro team
- PFW-AFL = Pro Football Weekly All-AFL team
- PFWA = Pro Football Writers of America All-Pro team
- SN = Sporting News All-AFL team
- UPI = United Press International All-AFL team

^{t} denotes a tie in balloting
