= 1968 All-Pro Team =

Official list of the best professional football players in 1968

This is a list of players named as All-Pros based on their performance in the 1968 AFL and NFL season. These lists provide a perspective into how players were judged against their peers by critics of their time. Players representing both the National Football League (NFL) and American Football League (AFL) are included.

== Selectors ==
Teams were selected by several publications and wire services: the Associated Press (AP), the Newspaper Enterprise Association (NEA), the New York Daily News (NYDN), Pro Football Weekly (PFW), the Pro Football Writers of America (PFWA), the Sporting News (SN) and the United Press International (UPI).

The PFWA selected a true "All-Pro" team which included players from both the NFL and AFL. The AP, NEA, Daily News and UPI selected one team for each league, which are referred to as "All-NFL" and "All-AFL" teams. Pro Football Weekly named both a unified All-Pro team as well as All-NFL and All-AFL teams representing each of the leagues individually. The Sporting News named a single All-AFL team and All-Conference teams representing each of the two NFL conferences.

All of the publications named both first-team and second-team performers, with the exception of Pro Football Weekly and the Sporting News, which only selected only a first-team.

== NFL All-Pros ==
Eleven NFL players were named to the first-team of every list presented here: Lem Barney, Gene Hickerson, Deacon Jones, Leroy Kelly, Bob Lilly, Billy Lothridge, John Mackey, Ralph Neely, Merlin Olsen, Gale Sayers and Larry Wilson.

Offense
Position	First team	Second team
Quarterback	Earl Morrall, Baltimore Colts (AP, NEA, NYDN, PFW-NFL, UPI)	Bill Nelsen, Cleveland Browns (AP-2, UPI)
Halfback	Leroy Kelly, Cleveland Browns (AP, NEA, NYDN, PFW, PFW-NFL, PFWA, UPI); Gale Sayers, Chicago Bears (AP, NEA, NYDN, PFW, PFW-NFL, PFWA, UPI)	Bill Brown, Minnesota Vikings (AP, NEA, NYDN, PFWA, UPI); Don Perkins, Dallas Cowboys (NEA); Ken Willard, San Francisco 49ers (NYDN, UPI); Tom Woodeshick, Philadelphia Eagles (AP)
End/ Flanker/ Split End	Bob Hayes, Dallas Cowboys (AP, NYDN); Clifton McNeil, San Francisco 49ers (AP, NEA, NYDN, PFW-NFL, PFWA, UPI); Paul Warfield, Cleveland Browns (NEA, PFW-NFL, UPI)	Carroll Dale, Green Bay Packers (NEA); Bob Hayes, Dallas Cowboys (UPI); Roy Jefferson, Pittsburgh Steelers (AP, NEA, UPI); Homer Jones, New York Giants (NYDN); Willie Richardson, Baltimore Colts (PFWA); Charley Taylor, Washington Redskins (NYDN); Paul Warfield, Cleveland Browns (AP)
Tight end	John Mackey, Baltimore Colts (AP, NEA, NYDN, PFW, PFW-NFL, PFWA, UPI)	Jackie Smith, St. Louis Cardinals (AP, NEA, NYDN, UPI)
Tackle	Bob Brown, Philadelphia Eagles (AP, NEA, PFW-NFL); Ralph Neely, Dallas Cowboys (AP, NEA, NYDN, PFW, PFW-NFL, PFWA, UPI); Bob Vogel, Baltimore Colts (NYDN, PFWA, SN, UPI)	Bob Brown, Philadelphia Eagles (NYDN, PFWA, UPI); Charley Cowan, Los Angeles Rams (AP, NYDN); Ernie McMillan, St. Louis Cardinals (NEA, UPI); Bob Vogel, Baltimore Colts (AP, NEA)
Guard	Gene Hickerson, Cleveland Browns (AP, NEA, NYDN, PFW, PFW-NFL, PFWA, UPI); Howard Mudd, San Francisco 49ers (AP, NEA, NYDN, PFW-NFL, UPI)	Pete Case, New York Giants (PFWA); Gale Gillingham, Green Bay Packers (NEA, UPI); Ken Gray, St. Louis Cardinals (NYDN); Jerry Kramer, Green Bay Packers (AP); Tom Mack, Los Angeles Rams (NEA, UPI); Glenn Ressler, Baltimore Colts (NYDN); George Seals, Chicago Bears (AP)
Center	Mick Tingelhoff, Minnesota Vikings (AP, NEA, NEA, NYDN, PFW-NFL, PFWA, UPI)	Bob DeMarco, St. Louis Cardinals (AP, NEA, NYDN, UPI)

Special teams
Position	First team	Second team
Kicker	no selections	no publications named a second-team kicker
Punter	Billy Lothridge, Atlanta Falcons (PFWA)	no publications named a second-team punter

Defense
Position	First team	Second team
Defensive end	Deacon Jones, Los Angeles Rams (AP, NEA, NYDN, PFW, PFW-NFL, PFWA, UPI); Carl Eller, Minnesota Vikings (AP, NEA, NYDN, PFW, PFW-NFL, PFWA, UPI)	George Andrie, Dallas Cowboys (NEA, UPI); Doug Atkins, New Orleans Saints (AP, NEA); Jim Marshall, Minnesota Vikings (NYDN); Bubba Smith, Baltimore Colts (AP, NYDN, PFWA, UPI)
Defensive tackle	Bob Lilly, Dallas Cowboys (AP, NEA, NYDN, PFW, PFW-NFL, PFWA UPI); Merlin Olsen, Los Angeles Rams (AP, NEA, NYDN, PFW, PFW-NFL, PFWA, UPI)	Walter Johnson, Cleveland Browns (NEA); Alex Karras, Detroit Lions (NEA, NYDN); Fred Miller, Baltimore Colts (NYDN, PFWA, UPI); Alan Page, Minnesota Vikings (UPI); Jethro Pugh, Dallas Cowboys (AP); Billy Ray Smith, Baltimore Colts (AP)
Middle linebacker	Dick Butkus, Chicago Bears (AP, NEA, PFW, PFW-NFL, PFWA, UPI); Tommy Nobis, Atlanta Falcons (NYDN)	Dick Butkus, Chicago Bears (NYDN); Tommy Nobis, Atlanta Falcons (AP, NEA, PFWA, UPI)
Outside linebacker	Mike Curtis, Baltimore Colts (AP, NYDN, PFW, PFW-NFL, PFWA, UPI); Chuck Howley, Dallas Cowboys (AP, NEA, PFW-NFL); Dave Robinson, Green Bay Packers (NEA, NYDN, UPI)	Maxie Baughan, Los Angeles Rams (AP, NYDN); Mike Curtis, Baltimore Colts (NEA); Chuck Howley, Dallas Cowboys (NYDN, PFWA, UPI); Dave Robinson, Green Bay Packers (AP, PFWA); Andy Russell, Pittsburgh Steelers (UPI); Dave Wilcox, San Francisco 49ers (NEA)
Cornerback	Lem Barney, Detroit Lions (AP, NEA, NYDN, PFW, PFW-NFL, PFWA, UPI); Bobby Boyd, Baltimore Colts (AP, NYDN, PFW-NFL, PFWA, UPI); Cornell Green, Dallas Cowboys (NEA)	Kermit Alexander, San Francisco 49ers (NYDN, UPI); Ben Davis, Cleveland Browns (AP); Cornell Green, Dallas Cowboys (AP, NYDN, PFWA, UPI); Bob Jeter, Green Bay Packers (NEA); Jimmy Johnson, San Francisco 49ers (NEA)
Safety	Eddie Meador, Los Angeles Rams (AP); Rick Volk, Baltimore Colts (NEA, PFWA); Larry Wilson, St. Louis Cardinals (AP, NEA, NYDN, PFW, PFW-NFL, PFWA, UPI); Willie Wood, Green Bay Packers (NYDN, PFW, UPI)	Paul Krause, Minnesota Vikings (AP); Jerry Logan, Baltimore Colts (PFWA); Eddie Meador, Los Angeles Rams (NEA, NYDN, PFWA, UPI); Rick Volk, Baltimore Colts (UPI); Willie Wood, Green Bay Packers (AP, NEA)

Note: only the Pro Football Writers and Sporting News teams include special teams players.

=== Key (NFL) ===
- AP = Associated Press All-NFL team
- NEA = Newspaper Enterprise Association All-NFL team
- NYDN = New York Daily News All-NFL team
- PFW = Pro Football Weekly All-Pro team
- PFW-NFL = Pro Football Weekly All-NFL team
- PFWA = Pro Football Writers of America All-Pro team
- SN = Sporting News All-Conference team
- UPI = United Press International All-NFL team

^{t} denotes a tie in balloting

== AFL All-Pros ==
Three AFL players were named to the first-team of every list presented here: Lance Alworth, Joe Namath and George Webster.

Offense
Position	First team	Second team
Quarterback	Joe Namath, New York Jets (AP, NEA, NYDN, PFW, PFW-AFL, PFWA, SN, UPI)	Len Dawson, Kansas City Chiefs (AP, UPI); Bob Griese, Miami Dolphins (NEA); John Hadl, San Diego Chargers (SN); Daryle Lamonica, Oakland Raiders (NYDN)
Halfback	Hewritt Dixon, Oakland Raiders (AP, NEA, NYDN, PFW, PFW-AFL, SN, UPI); Paul Robinson, Cincinnati Bengals (AP, NEA, NYDN, PFW-AFL, SN, UPI)	Robert Holmes, Kansas City Chiefs (AP, NEA, SN, UPI); Dickie Post, San Diego Chargers (AP, NEA, NYDN, SN, UPI); Paul Robinson, Cincinnati Bengals (PFWA); Matt Snell, New York Jets (NYDN)
Flanker/ Split End	Lance Alworth, San Diego Chargers (AP, NEA, NYDN, PFW, PFW-AFL, PFWA, SN, UPI); Don Maynard, New York Jets (NYDN); George Sauer, New York Jets (AP, NEA, PFW, PFW-AFL, PFWA, SN, UPI)	Gary Garrison, San Diego Chargers (SN); Don Maynard, New York Jets (AP, SN, UPI); George Sauer, New York Jets (NYDN)
Tight end	Alvin Reed, Houston Oilers (NYDN, SN); Jim Whalen, Boston Patriots (AP, NEA, PFW-AFL, UPI)	Billy Cannon, Oakland Raiders (PFWA); Jacque MacKinnon, San Diego Chargers (NEA, SN); Alvin Reed, Houston Oilers (AP, UPI); Jim Whalen, Boston Patriots (NYDN)
Tackle	Ron Mix, San Diego Chargers (AP, NEA, NYDN, PFW, PFW-AFL, SN, UPI); Harry Schuh, Oakland Raiders (NYDN); Walt Suggs, Houston Oilers (SN); Jim Tyrer, Kansas City Chiefs (AP, NEA, PFW-AFL, UPI)	Stew Barber, Buffalo Bills (NYDN); Winston Hill, New York Jets (NYDN, SN); Ron Mix, San Diego Chargers (PFWA); Harry Schuh, Oakland Raiders (AP, NEA, UPI); Walt Suggs, Houston Oilers (AP, NEA, UPI); Jim Tyrer, Kansas City Chiefs (SN)
Guard	Ed Budde, Kansas City Chiefs (AP, NEA, SN, UPI); Dave Herman, New York Jets (NEA); Walt Sweeney, San Diego Chargers (AP, NEA, NYDN, PFW, PFW-AFL, SN, UPI); Gene Upshaw, Oakland Raiders (AP, PFW-AFL, SN, UPI)	Ed Budde, Kansas City Chiefs (NYDN); Dave Herman, New York Jets (NYDN); Billy Shaw, Buffalo Bills (AP, SN); Gene Upshaw, Oakland Raiders (NEA, NYDN, PFWA)
Center	Jim Otto, Oakland Raiders (AP, NEA, PFW, PFW-AFL, SN, UPI); John Schmitt, New York Jets (NYDN)	Bob Johnson, Cincinnati Bengals (NEA); Jon Morris, Boston Patriots (SN); Jim Otto, Oakland Raiders (NYDN); John Schmitt, New York Jets (AP, UPI)

Special teams
Position	First team	Second team
Kicker	Jan Stenerud, Kansas City Chiefs (SN); Jim Turner, New York Jets (PFW-AFL, PFWA)	Jan Stenerud, Kansas City Chiefs (PFWA); Jim Turner, New York Jets (SN)
Punter	Jerrel Wilson, Kansas City Chiefs (PFW-AFL, SN)	Curley Johnson, New York Jets (SN); Jerrel Wilson, Kansas City Chiefs (PFW-AFL, SN)

Defense
Position	First team	Second team
Defensive end	Rich Jackson, Denver Broncos (AP, PFW-AFL, UPI); Ike Lassiter, Oakland Raiders (NYDN); Jerry Mays, Kansas City Chiefs (SN); Ron McDole, Buffalo Bills (NEA); Gerry Philbin, New York Jets (AP, NEA, NYDN, PFW, PFW-AFL, SN, UPI)	Rich Jackson, Denver Broncos (NYDN, SN); Ike Lassiter, Oakland Raiders (NEA, UPI); Jerry Mays, Kansas City Chiefs (AP, NEA, UPI); Ron McDole, Buffalo Bills (AP, NYDN, SN); Gerry Philbin, New York Jets (PFWA)
Defensive tackle	Houston Antwine, Boston Patriots (NEA, SN); Dan Birdwell, Oakland Raiders (AP, PFW-AFL, SN, UPI); Buck Buchanan, Kansas City Chiefs (AP, NEA, NYDN, PFW, PFW-AFL, UPI); John Elliott, New York Jets (NYDN)	Houston Antwine, Boston Patriots (AP, UPI); Dan Birdwell, Oakland Raiders (NEA); Buck Buchanan, Kansas City Chiefs (PFWA, SN); Dave Costa, Denver Broncos (NEA, SN); John Elliott, New York Jets (AP, UPI); Jim Hunt, Boston Patriots (NYDN); Tom Sestak, Buffalo Bills (NYDN)
Middle linebacker	Nick Buoniconti, Miami Dolphins (SN); Dan Conners, Oakland Raiders (NYDN, PFW-AFL, UPI); Willie Lanier, Kansas City Chiefs (AP, NEA)	Al Atkinson, New York Jets (NEA^{[t]}); Nick Buoniconti, Miami Dolphins (UPI); Dan Conners, Oakland Raiders (AP, NEA^{[t]}); Willie Lanier, Kansas City Chiefs (NYDN, SN)
Outside linebacker	Bobby Bell, Kansas City Chiefs (AP, NEA, NYDN, PFW-AFL, SN, UPI); George Webster, Houston Oilers (AP, NEA, NYDN, PFW, PFW-AFL, PFWA, SN, UPI)	Frank Buncom, Cincinnati Bengals (UPI); Larry Grantham, New York Jets (AP, NYDN); Jim Lynch, Kansas City Chiefs (AP, NEA, UPI); Gus Otto, Oakland Raiders (SN); Mike Stratton, Buffalo Bills (NEA, NYDN, SN)
Cornerback	Willie Brown, Oakland Raiders (AP, NEA, PFW-AFL, SN, UPI); Butch Byrd, Buffalo Bills (NYDN); Miller Farr, Houston Oilers (AP, NEA, NYDN, PFW, PFW-AFL, SN, UPI)	Willie Brown, Oakland Raiders (PFWA); Butch Byrd, Buffalo Bills (AP, NEA); Booker Edgerson, Buffalo Bills (NYDN, UPI); Kent McCloughan, Oakland Raiders (NYDN, SN); Leroy Mitchell, Boston Patriots (AP, UPI); Johnny Sample, New York Jets (NYDN, UPI); Jimmy Warren, Miami Dolphins (NEA, SN)
Safety	Kenny Graham, San Diego Chargers (SN); Dave Grayson, Oakland Raiders (AP, NEA, PFW-AFL, UPI); Jim Hudson, New York Jets (NYDN); Johnny Robinson, Kansas City Chiefs (AP, NEA, NYDN, PFW, PFW-AFL, SN, UPI); George Saimes, Buffalo Bills (NYDN)	Kenny Graham, San Diego Chargers (AP, NEA, NYDN, UPI); Dave Grayson, Oakland Raiders (NYDN, SN); Ken Houston, Houston Oilers (NEA); Jim Hudson, New York Jets (AP); George Sarnes, Buffalo Bills (SN, UPI)

=== Key (AFL) ===
- AP = Associated Press All-AFL team
- NEA = Newspaper Enterprise Association All-AFL team
- NYDN = New York Daily News All-AFL team
- PFW = Pro Football Weekly All-Pro team
- PFW-AFL = Pro Football Weekly All-AFL team
- PFWA = Pro Football Writers of America All-Pro team
- SN = Sporting News All-AFL team
- UPI = United Press International All-AFL team

^{t} denotes a tie in balloting
