= 1966 All-Pro Team =

The Associated Press (AP), United Press International (UPI), Newspaper Enterprise Association (NEA), and New York Daily News selected All-Pro players following the 1966 NFL season.

== Teams ==
Offense
| Position | Players |
|---|---|
| Quarterbacks | Bart Starr, Green Bay Packers Sonny Jurgensen, Washington Redskins; Don Meredith, Dallas Cowboys |
| Running backs | Timmy Brown, Halfback, Philadelphia Eagles Leroy Kelly, Halfback, Cleveland Browns; Dan Reeves, Halfback, Dallas Cowboys; Gale Sayers, Halfback, Chicago Bears; Dick Bass, Fullback, Los Angeles Rams; Jim Taylor, Fullback, Green Bay Packers |
| Wide receivers | Gary Collins, Flanker, Cleveland Browns Pat Studstill, Flanker, Detroit Lions; Bob Hayes, Split end, Dallas Cowboys; Dave Parks Split end, San Francisco 49ers Charley Taylor, Split end, Washington Redskins |
| Tight ends | John Mackey, Baltimore Colts Mike Ditka, Chicago Bears; Pete Retzlaff, Philadelphia Eagles; Jackie Smith, St. Louis Cardinals |
| Tackles | Bob Vogel, Left Tackle, Baltimore Colts Bob Brown, Right Tackle, Philadelphia Eagles; Forrest Gregg, Right Tackle, Green Bay Packers; Ernie McMillan, Right Tackle, St. Louis Cardinals; Ralph Neely, Right Tackle, Dallas Cowboys; Jim Parker, Right Tackle, Baltimore Colts; Walt Rock, Right Tackle, San Francisco 49ers |
| Guards | Tony Liscio, Left Guard, Dallas Cowboys John Thomas, Left Guard, San Francisco 49ers Fuzzy Thurston, Left Guard, Green Bay Packers; John Wooten, Left Guard, Cleveland Browns; John Gordy, Right Guard, Detroit Lions; Ken Gray, Right Guard, St. Louis Cardinals; Gene Hickerson, Right Guard, Cleveland Browns; Jerry Kramer, Right Guard, Green Bay Packers |
| Centers | Bruce Bosley, San Francisco 49ers Bob DeMarco, St. Louis Cardinals; Greg Larson, New York Giants; Jim Ringo, Philadelphia Eagles; Mick Tingelhoff, Minnesota Vikings |

Defense
| Position | Players |
|---|---|
| Defensive ends | Willie Davis, Left, Green Bay Packers Deacon Jones, Left, Los Angeles Rams; Jim Katcavage, Left, New York Giants; Ben McGee, Left, Pittsburgh Steelers; Joe Robb, Left, St. Louis Cardinals; George Andrie, Right, Dallas Cowboys; Ordell Braase, Right, Baltimore Colts |
| Defensive tackles | Alex Karras, Left, Detroit Lions Merlin Olsen, Left, Los Angeles Rams; Floyd Peters, Left, Philadelphia Eagles; Roger Brown, Right, Detroit Lions; Henry Jordan, Right, Green Bay Packers; Bob Lilly, Right, Dallas Cowboys |
| Outside linebackers | John Campbell, Left, Pittsburgh Steelers Joe Fortunato, Left, Chicago Bears; Jim Houston, Left, Cleveland Browns; Chuck Howley, Left, Dallas Cowboys; Dave Robinson, Left, Green Bay Packers; Dave Wilcox, Left, San Francisco 49ers Maxie Baughan, Right, Los Angeles Rams; Lee Roy Caffey, Right, Green Bay Packers; Wayne Walker, Right, Detroit Lions |
| Middle linebackers | Dick Butkus, Chicago Bears Lee Roy Jordan, Dallas Cowboys; Ray Nitschke, Green Bay Packers |
| Cornerbacks | Herb Adderley, Green Bay Packers Erich Barnes, Cleveland Browns; Bobby Boyd, Baltimore Colts; Cornell Green, Dallas Cowboys; Jimmy Johnson, San Francisco 49ers |
| Safeties | Ross Fichtner, Cleveland Browns Richie Petitbon, Chicago Bears; Jerry Stovall, St. Louis Cardinals; Clendon Thomas, Pittsburgh Steelers; Willie Wood, Green Bay Packers; Eddie Meador, Los Angeles Rams; Mel Renfro, Dallas Cowboys; Larry Wilson, St. Louis Cardinals |

Special teams
| Position | Players |
|---|---|
| Kickers | Charlie Gogolak, Washington Redskins Bruce Gossett, Los Angeles Rams |
| Punters | Sam Baker, Philadelphia Eagles David Lee, Baltimore Colts |
