= 1967 All-Pro Team =

Official list of the best NFL players in 1967

The following is a list of players that were named to the Associated Press All-Pro Team in 1967. Players from the first and second teams are listed, with players from the first team in bold, where applicable.

== Teams ==
Offense
Position	Players
Quarterbacks	**Johnny Unitas**, Baltimore Colts Sonny Jurgensen, Washington Redskins
Halfbacks	**Leroy Kelly**, Cleveland Browns Dave Osborn, Minnesota Vikings; **Gale Sayers**, Chicago Bears
Fullbacks	Don Perkins, Dallas Cowboys Johnny Roland, St. Louis Cardinals
Wide receivers/flankers	Gary Collins, Cleveland Browns **Willie Richardson**, Baltimore Colts; Pat Studstill, Detroit Lions
Wide receivers/split ends	Boyd Dowler, Green Bay Packers Bob Hayes, Dallas Cowboys; Homer Jones, New York Giants; **Charley Taylor**, Washington Redskins
Tight ends	**John Mackey**, Baltimore Colts Jackie Smith, St. Louis Cardinals; Jerry Smith, Washington Redskins
Tackles	Bob Vogel (LT), Baltimore Colts Bob Brown (RT), Philadelphia Eagles; Charley Cowan (RT), Los Angeles Rams; **Forrest Gregg** (RT), Green Bay Packers; Ernie McMillan (RT), St. Louis Cardinals; **Ralph Neely** (RT), Dallas Cowboys
Guards	John Gordy (RG), Detroit Lions Ken Gray (RG), St. Louis Cardinals; **Gene Hickerson**(RG), Cleveland Browns; **Jerry Kramer** (RG), Green Bay Packers; Howard Mudd(RG), San Francisco 49ers
Centers	**Bob DeMarco**, St. Louis Cardinals Mick Tingelhoff, Minnesota Vikings

Defense
Position	Players
Left defensive ends	**Willie Davis**, Green Bay Packers Carl Eller, Minnesota Vikings; **Deacon Jones**, Los Angeles Rams
Right defensive ends	George Andrie, Dallas Cowboys Ordell Braase, Baltimore Colts; Bill Glass, Cleveland Browns; Lamar Lundy, Los Angeles Rams
Left defensive tackles	Alex Karras, Detroit Lions Fred Miller, Baltimore Colts; **Merlin Olsen**, Los Angeles Rams; Floyd Peters, Philadelphia Eagles
Right defensive tackles	Henry Jordan, Green Bay Packers **Bob Lilly**, Dallas Cowboys; Chuck Walker, St. Louis Cardinals
Outside linebackers	**Chuck Howley** (Left), Dallas Cowboys **Dave Robinson** (Left), Green Bay Packers; Dave Wilcox (Left), San Francisco 49ers Maxie Baughan (Right), Los Angeles Rams; Andy Russell (Right), Pittsburgh Steelers
Inside/middle linebackers	Dick Butkus, Chicago Bears Dale Meinert, St. Louis Cardinals; Ray Nitschke, Green Bay Packers; **Tommy Nobis**, Atlanta Falcons
Cornerbacks	Herb Adderly, Green Bay Packers Lem Barney, Detroit Lions; Bobby Boyd, Baltimore Colts; **Cornell Green**, Dallas Cowboys; Dave Whitsell, New Orleans Saints; **Bob Jeter**, Green Bay Packers
Safety	Richie Petitbon, Chicago Bears Eddie Meador, Los Angeles Rams Mel Renfro, Dallas Cowboys; **Larry Wilson**, St. Louis Cardinals; **Willie Wood**, Green Bay Packers

Special teams
Position	Players
Kickers	Jim Bakken, St. Louis Cardinals Don Chandler, Green Bay Packers
