= 1965 All-Pro Team =

The following is a list of National Football League (American football) players that were named to the Associated Press All-Pro Team in 1965. Players from the first and second teams are listed, with players from the first team in bold, where applicable.

== Teams ==
Offense
| Position | Players |
|---|---|
| Quarterbacks | **Johnny Unitas**, Baltimore Colts John Brodie, San Francisco 49ers |
| Running backs | Timmy Brown, Halfback, Philadelphia Eagles **Gale Sayers**, Halfback, Chicago Bears; Bill Brown, Fullback, Minnesota Vikings; **Jim Brown**, Fullback, Cleveland Browns; Ken Willard, Fullback, San Francisco 49ers |
| Wide receivers | Gary Collins, Flanker, Cleveland Browns **Jimmy Orr**, Flanker, Baltimore Colts; Raymond Berry, Split End, Baltimore Colts; Bob Hayes, Split End, Dallas Cowboys; **Dave Parks**, Split End, San Francisco 49ers |
| Tight ends | **Pete Retzlaff**, Philadelphia Eagles Mike Ditka, Chicago Bears |
| Tackles | Grady Alderman, Left, Minnesota Vikings Rosey Brown, Left, New York Giants; **Dick Schafrath**, Left, Cleveland Browns; Bob Vogel, Left, Baltimore Colts; **Bob Brown**, Right, Philadelphia Eagles; Bob Wetoska, Right, Chicago Bears |
| Guards | **Forrest Gregg**, Left, Green Bay Packers **Jim Parker**, Left, Baltimore Colts; John Wooten, Left, Cleveland Browns; John Gordy, Right, Detroit Lions; Ken Gray, Right, St. Louis Cardinals; Gene Hickerson, Right, Cleveland Browns |
| Centers | Bob DeMarco, St. Louis Cardinals John Morrow, Cleveland Browns; Mike Pyle, Chicago Bears; **Mick Tingelhoff**, Minnesota Vikings |

Defense
| Position | Players |
|---|---|
| Defensive ends | **Willie Davis**, Left, Green Bay Packers **Deacon Jones**, Left, Los Angeles Rams; Doug Atkins, Right, Chicago Bears; John Baker, Right, Pittsburgh Steelers; Ordell Braase, Right, Baltimore Colts; Bill Glass, Right, Cleveland Browns |
| Defensive tackles | **Alex Karras**, Left, Detroit Lions Charlie Krueger, Left, San Francisco 49ers Merlin Olsen, Left, Los Angeles Rams; Sam Silas, Left, St. Louis Cardinals; Roger Brown, Right, Detroit Lions; **Bob Lilly**, Right, Dallas Cowboys |
| Outside Linebackers | **Joe Fortunato**, Chicago Bears Jim Houston, Cleveland Browns; Steve Stonebreaker, Baltimore Colts; Maxie Baughan, Philadelphia Eagles; **Wayne Walker**, Detroit Lions |
| Inside/Middle Linebackers | **Dick Butkus**, Chicago Bears Sam Huff, Washington Redskins; Ray Nitschke, Green Bay Packers |
| Cornerbacks | **Herb Adderley**, Left, Green Bay Packers **Bobby Boyd**, Left, Baltimore Colts; Pat Fischer, Left, St. Louis Cardinals; Jimmy Johnson, Left, San Francisco 49ers Dick LeBeau, Left, Detroit Lions; Bennie McRae, Left, Chicago Bears; Johnny Sample, Left, Washington Redskins; Dick Lynch, Right, New York Giants |
| Safeties | **Willie Wood**, Left, Green Bay Packers **Paul Krause**, Right, Washington Redskins; Eddie Meador, Right, Los Angeles Rams; Mel Renfro, Right, Dallas Cowboys; Rosey Taylor, Right, Chicago Bears; Larry Wilson, Right, St. Louis Cardinals |

Special teams
| Position | Players |
|---|---|
| Kickers | Lou Groza, Cleveland Browns |
| Punters | Don Chandler, Green Bay Packers Tommy Davis, San Francisco 49ers |
