= John Schmitt (American football) =

American football player (born 1942)

No. 56, 52
- Position: Center

Personal information
- Born: November 12, 1942 (age 83); Brooklyn, New York, U.S.
- Listed height: 6 ft 4 in (1.93 m)
- Listed weight: 250 lb (113 kg)

Career information
- High school: Seton Hall (Patchogue, New York)
- College: Hofstra (1961–1963)
- NFL draft: 1964: undrafted

Career history
- New York Jets (1965–1973); Green Bay Packers (1974)

Awards and highlights
- Super Bowl champion (III); AFL champion (1968); 2× Second-team All-AFL (1968, 1969); First-team I-AA All-American (1963); Hofstra Pride No. 77 retired
- Stats at Pro Football Reference

John Charles Schmitt (born November 12, 1942) is an American former professional football player who was a center in the National Football League (NFL) for 10 seasons with the New York Jets, from whom he started in Super Bowl III. He ended his career in 1974 with the Green Bay Packers. He played college football for the Hofstra Pride.

He was inducted into the Suffolk Sports Hall of Fame in the Football Category with the Class of 1992.

He lost his Super Bowl ring in the 80's while surfing. A lifeguard found and kept it. When the lifeguard died, his great-niece found it while going through his belongings, and contacted the Jets, who identified it and connected her to Schmitt. After returning the ring, she and Schmidt remained friends.
