= Bob Reynolds (American football, born 1939) =

American football player (1939–1996)

No. 71, 74
- Position: Offensive tackle

Personal information
- Born: January 22, 1939; Nashville, Tennessee, U.S.
- Died: October 10, 1996 (aged 57); Naperville, Illinois, U.S.
- Listed height: 6 ft 5 in (1.96 m)
- Listed weight: 265 lb (120 kg)

Career information
- High school: John Adams (Cleveland, Ohio)
- College: Bowling Green
- NFL draft: 1963: 2nd round, 17th overall pick
- AFL draft: 1963: 4th round, 30th overall pick

Career history
- St. Louis Cardinals (1963–1971); New England Patriots (1972–1973); St. Louis Cardinals (1973)

Awards and highlights
- 3× Pro Bowl (1966, 1968-1969)

Career NFL statistics
- Games played: 141
- Games started: 120
- Fumble recoveries: 1
- Stats at Pro Football Reference

Robert Louis Reynolds (January 22, 1939 – October 10, 1996) was an American football player, who played chiefly with the St. Louis Cardinals of the National Football League as an offensive tackle. He was an all-conference player during his college football career at Bowling Green State University, and a three-time Pro Bowl player in an eleven year NFL career.

== Early life ==
Reynolds was born on January 22, 1939, in Nashville, Tennessee. He grew up in the Cleveland, Ohio area, where he played high school football at John Adams High School. Reynolds was the oldest of 12 children. His father Forrest Reynolds, a machine operator, was 6 ft 8 in tall and weighed 280 pounds, while his mother Venell (Blackwell) Reynolds was 6 ft 2 in. Reynolds himself was 6 ft 5 in and weighed 265 pounds during his playing days.

== College career ==
He attended Bowling Green State University (BGSU) for college, graduating in 1964. He was on the football, wrestling and track teams. The Falcons lost only three games during his career there, winning two Mid-American Conference championships. Reynolds won All-Conference honors in 1961 and 1962. He was selected to the All-American Bowl and the Chicago College All-Star Game. In 1973, he was inducted into Bowling Green's Athletic Hall of Fame.

== Professional football career ==
He was a second round selection (17th overall pick) in the 1963 NFL draft by the St. Louis Cardinals. He played in every game his rookie year, but became a full-time starter in his second year, at left tackle, playing in 141 games over his career. He was named to the Pro Bowl three times (1966, 1968, 1969). During the 1960s, Reynolds and his offensive linemates, Bob DeMarco (center), Irv Goode (left guard), Ken Gray (right guard), and Ernie McMillan (right tackle) were selected to a total of 18 Pro Bowls.

Reynolds played 12 seasons in the NFL for the St. Louis Cardinals (1963–1971, 1973) and the New England Patriots (1972–1973). He missed only five games for the Cardinals from 1963 to 1971, playing in 121 games. The Cardinals released him in 1972 after drafting future Hall of Fame tackle Dan Dierdorf. He played the next two years for the Patriots, and then came back to the Cardinals for one game in 1973.

== Post-football career ==
Reynolds earned a master's degree from St. Louis University in urban affairs, and during his playing days volunteered to work with children in detention. After retiring, Reynolds worked for Anheuser-Busch in St. Louis for 20 years. After that, he moved to Chicago and served as a church deacon and in an outreach ministry.

== Death ==
Reynolds died in 1996.
