= Herb Adderley =

American gridiron football player (1939–2020)

- Adderley with the Green Bay Packers

No. 26
- Position: Cornerback

Personal information
- Born: June 8, 1939; Philadelphia, Pennsylvania, U.S.
- Died: October 30, 2020 (aged 81); Mantua, New Jersey, U.S.
- Listed height: 6 ft 0 in (1.83 m)
- Listed weight: 205 lb (93 kg)

Career information
- High school: Northeast (Philadelphia)
- College: Michigan State (1957–1960)
- NFL draft: 1961: 1st round, 12th overall pick
- AFL draft: 1961: 2nd round, 10th overall pick

Career history
- Green Bay Packers (1961–1969); Dallas Cowboys (1970–1972)

Awards and highlights
- 3× Super Bowl champion (I, II, VI); 5× NFL champion (1961, 1962, 1965, 1966, 1967); 4× First-team All-Pro (1962, 1963, 1965, 1966); 3× Second-team All-Pro (1964, 1967, 1969); 5× Pro Bowl (1963–1967); NFL 1960s All-Decade Team; Green Bay Packers Hall of Fame; First-team All-Big Ten (1960); Third-team All-Big Ten (1959)

Career NFL statistics
- Interceptions: 48
- Interception yards: 1,046
- Fumble recoveries: 14
- Defensive touchdowns: 7
- Stats at Pro Football Reference
- Pro Football Hall of Fame

Herbert Anthony Adderley (June 8, 1939 – October 30, 2020) was an American professional football cornerback who played for the Green Bay Packers and the Dallas Cowboys of the National Football League (NFL). In 1980, he was enshrined in the Pro Football Hall of Fame.

Adderley played college football for the Michigan State Spartans and was an All-Big Ten offensive star as a halfback. He is the only player to appear in four of the first six Super Bowls. He played on six NFL championship teams, and appeared in seven NFL championship games.

== Early life ==
Adderley was born on June 8, 1939, in Philadelphia, Pennsylvania to Charles and Reva (White) Adderley. Charles was a factory machinist. Adderley was raised in Philadelphia and graduated from Northeast High School in 1957, where he starred in football, basketball, and baseball, and won All-City Honors in all three. Adderley originally perceived of himself as a basketball player, until his high school football coach Charles Martin convinced him to play football. He also lettered in track. Adderley and his football backfield teammate Angelo Coia were known as the "Touchdown Twins". Coia would go on to have a seven-year NFL career as a receiver.

Adderley was selected to play for the Pennsylvania high school all stars in the first Big 33 Football Classic in 1957 (though the game was not played). He was honorary chair of the 1997 Big 33 game. In January 1957, Adderley received the 17th annual Men of Cliveden Award as the outstanding scholastic athlete in the Philadelphia region.

== College career ==
Adderley attended Michigan State University (MSU) in East Lansing, the first time in his life going out of Philadelphia. He chose MSU because of the powerful impression its star running back Clarence Peaks had on Adderley when he saw Peaks playing on television; and he wore the jersey number 26 to honor Peaks throughout his later career at Michigan State and professionally. He played football under head coach Duffy Daugherty, primarily as a halfback, but also at safety.

Adderley led the Spartans in rushing yards as a junior in 1959 and pass reception yardage in both 1959 and 1960. Adderley was the co-captain of the team as a senior, and played both offense and defense. For his MSU career, he had 813 rushing yards and four rushing touchdowns, plus 28 pass receptions for 519 yards (18.5 yards per reception) and four receiving touchdowns. His teammates included, among others, future NFL receiver Gary Ballman, and future American Football League All Stars, tight end Fred Arbanas and safety George Saimes.

He made first team All-Big Ten Conference, and played in the East-West Shrine Game, the Coaches' All-American, and the College All-Star games. He was picked for the All-Michigan State University team in 1970.

He is also one of the founding members of the Sigma Chapter of Omega Psi Phi fraternity at Michigan State University along with Ernie Green of the "Little Rock Nine", established on campus in 1960 or 1961.

His yearly performances included:

- 1958: 9 Games - 37 carries for 143 yards and two touchdowns; with six catches for 100 yards.
- 1959: 9 Games - 93 carries for 413 yards and two touchdowns; with 13 catches for 265 yards and two touchdowns.
- 1960: 9 Games - 68 carries for 251 yards; with nine catches for 154 yards and two touchdowns.

== Professional career ==
Adderley played for the Green Bay Packers from 1961 to 1969, and then played his final three seasons (1970 to 1972) with the Dallas Cowboys. While with the Packers, he won rings for five NFL championship teams, including wins in the first two Super Bowls. In the pre-Super Bowl era he was on the 1961, 1962 and 1965 NFL champion Green Bay Packers, and then played on the Packers' 1966 and 1967 NFL Championship teams as well as the Super Bowl I and II championship teams. He was on the Dallas Cowboys 1970 National Football Conference (NFC) championship team, and the Cowboys Super Bowl VI NFL championship team.

=== Green Bay Packers ===
Adderley was selected by the Green Bay Packers in the first round of the 1961 NFL draft, the 12th overall pick, one pick ahead of future Cowboys Hall of Fame teammate Bob Lilly. He was also drafted by the New York Titans (later Jets) in the second round of the AFL draft, 10th overall. He began his professional career as a halfback on offense, but was later switched to defense because the Packers already had eventual Hall of Fame runners in Paul Hornung and Jim Taylor. He did not have any rushing attempts that season, but did return 18 kickoffs for 478 yards (26.6 yards per return).

Adderley was first moved to cornerback to replace injured teammate Hank Gremminger against Detroit on Thanksgiving of 1961. He was one of the team's top special teams plays up to that point. He had an interception that set up the game-winning touchdown. Teammate and future Hall of Fame defensive back Emlen Tunnell, a Philadelphia area native in his final NFL season, had encouraged Lombardi to give Adderley an opportunity to play defensive back. The Packers were NFL champions in 1961, defeating the New York Giants, 37–0. Adderley intercepted a Y. A. Tittle pass in the championship game.

In 1962, the move to left cornerback became permanent, with Gremminger being moved to safety. Adderley went on to become a first-team NFL All-Pro selection five times in the 1960s. Packers coach Vince Lombardi remarked, "I was too stubborn to switch him to defense until I had to. Now when I think of what Adderley means to our defense, it scares me to think of how I almost mishandled him". In a 1962 game against the Baltimore Colts and future Hall of Fame quarterback great Johnny Unitas, Adderley had a 103-yard kickoff return for a touchdown, intercepted a Unitas pass, and saved the game with a fourth down pass deflection at the two yard-line in the game's final minute.

He had seven interceptions in total that season, tied for third most in the NFL; including a 50-yard interception return for a touchdown against the Chicago Bears. He returned 15 kickoffs for 418 yards (27.9 yards per return), and his 103-yard touchdown return against the Colts was the longest return in the NFL that season. He was named first-team All-Pro by the Associated Press (AP) and the Newspaper Enterprise Association (NEA), and second-team All-Pro by United Press International (UPI). The Packers defeated the New York Giants in the NFL Championship Game, 16–7.

In 1963, the Packers were 11–2–1, but finished second to the Chicago Bears (11–1–2). Adderley started all 14 games at left cornerback, with five interceptions. He returned 20 kickoffs for 597 yards. In an October 6 game against the Los Angeles Rams, he returned the opening kickoff 98 yards for a touchdown, following a key block by teammate Earl Gros. His 29.9 yards per return average was third best in the NFL. Adderley was selected to play in the Pro Bowl for the first time, and the AP again named him first-team All-Pro and the UPI named him second-team All-Pro. In 1964, he started 13 games at left cornerback with four interceptions. He returned 19 kickoffs for 508 yards, and his 26.7 yards per return was fourth best in the NFL. He was again selected to play in the Pro Bowl, and was named second-team All-Pro by the AP, UPI and NEA.

In 1965, he did not allow any touchdown receptions for the entire regular season. He again started all 14 games at left cornerback. He had six interceptions that he returned for a league leading 175 yards, including three interceptions returns for touchdowns. He was the named Associated Press Defensive Player of the Week for his performance on September 26, 1965, against the Baltimore Colts, in the second game of the season. He intercepted two Johnny Unitas passes, running one back for a touchdown, and recovered a fumble; leading the Packers to a 20–17 victory. He also had interception returns for touchdowns in the first game of the season against the Pittsburgh Steelers (34 yards) and in the final game of the season against the San Francisco 49ers (13 yards).

The Packers defeated the Baltimore Colts in the first round of the 1965 NFL playoffs, in sudden death overtime, Adderly calling it "the roughest game I've ever been in". That game was also memorable because the Colts had to use a halfback, Tom Matte, at quarterback due to injuries to Unitas and his backup, Gary Cuozzo; and the game-tying kick by the Packer's Don Chandler sending the game to overtime was hotly disputed by the Colts, with future Hall of Fame Colts head coach Don Shula still insisting decades later that Chandler's kick missed to the right. The Packers then went on to win the NFL championship over the Cleveland Browns, 23–12. In the championship game, Browns receiver Gary Collins scored the only touchdown pass against Adderley that season, but Adderley also intercepted a Frank Ryan pass in that game. He was again selected to play in the Pro Bowl, and was named first-team All-Pro by the AP, UPI and NEA for the 1965 season.

In 1966, Adderley again started all 14 games at left cornerback, was chosen to play in the Pro Bowl, and was named first-team All-Pro by the AP, UPI, NEA and the Pro Football Writers of America. He intercepted four passes, returning one 68 yards for a touchdown against the Atlanta Falcons on October 23; also returning 14 kickoffs for 320 yards. The Packers defeated the Dallas Cowboys 34–27 in the NFL Championship Game. Addlerley returned three kickoffs for 65 yards in that game. The Packers then went on to defeat the Kansas City Chiefs in the first Super Bowl, 35–10.

In 1967, Adderley once more started all 14 games at left cornerback. He had four interceptions, returning one for a touchdown against Jim Hart and the St. Louis Cardinals on October 30. He was again chosen to play in the Pro Bowl, and was named second-team All-Pro by the AP and NEA. The Packers defeated the Los Angeles Rams in the divisional round of the NFL playoffs, 28–7. The Packers then defeated the Cowboys for the NFL championship, 21–17, on the last play of the game, in what came to be known as the "Ice Bowl" because of the well below freezing temperatures in which the game was played. Adderley had the only interception in the game, during the second quarter on a Don Meredith pass.

The Packers then went on to win Super Bowl II, 33–14 over the Oakland Raiders. Adderley was a factor in the Super Bowl II win over the Raiders, intercepting a pass by Raiders quarterback Daryle Lamonica in the fourth quarter and returning it 60 yards for a touchdown to put the game away. It was the first Super Bowl touchdown scored on an intercepted pass.

Lombardi retired as head coach just a few weeks later (staying on as general manager), and was replaced by the Packers' defensive coordinator Phil Bengston. The Packers had a losing season in 1968 (6–7–1). Adderley remained the fulltime starter at left cornerback, with three interceptions. He also returned 14 kickoffs for 331 yards. The Packers were 8–6 the following season (1969), and Adderley was once again named first-team All-Pro by the AP and Pro Football Weekly. He was also named second-team All-AFL/NFL by the Pro Football Writers. He had five interceptions (tied for seventh in the NFL) and a league leading 169 return yards on interceptions.

Adderley had a strained relationship with Phil Bengtson by the end of the latter's second and penultimate year as Packers head coach. Adderly accused Bengtson of keeping him off the Pro Bowl team in 1969 and requested to be traded. After a holdout and two weeks before the start of the regular season, he was sent from the Packers to the Dallas Cowboys for Malcolm Walker and Clarence Williams on September 1, 1970. Adderley stated it was general manager Tex Schramm, rather than Cowboys' head coach Tom Landry, who wanted Adderley in Dallas.

Adderley recorded 39 interceptions in his nine seasons with the Packers, leading the team in four seasons, and ranking third in total interceptions in Packer history at the time of his death. He led the league in interception return yards in 1965 and 1969. He held the Green Bay records for interceptions returned for touchdowns in a career (seven, tied by Darren Sharper and then broken by Charles Woodson), and holds the record for interceptions returned for touchdowns in one season (three, in 1965, tied by Nick Collins and Woodson). Adderley was also an excellent run defender.

=== Dallas Cowboys ===
After joining the Cowboys in 1970, under head coach Tom Landry, Adderley became a vital cog in its "Doomsday Defense", assisting the Cowboys to an appearance in Super Bowl V and a win in Super Bowl VI. Adderley started all 14 games at left cornerback for the Cowboys in 1970, with three interceptions. He was part of a defensive backfield that included Cornell Green, future Hall of Fame defensive back Mel Renfro and Charlie Waters at safety. In the 1970 NFC playoffs, the Cowboys defeated the Detroit Lions, and then the San Francisco 49ers, to become National Football Conference champions. They lost in Super Bowl V to the Baltimore Colts on a field goal by Jim O'Brien with only seconds left in the game.

Adderly started 12 games for the Cowboys at left cornerback in 1971, with six interceptions, tied for ninth best in the NFL. His 182 interception return yards was fourth best. In the first round of the 1971 NFC playoffs against the Minnesota Vikings, he had an interception in the Cowboys, 20–12 win. With Adderley at starting left cornerback, the Cowboys defeated the 49ers, 14–3, to win the 1971 NFC championship. The Cowboys then defeated the Miami Dolphins, 24–3, in Super Bowl VI; with Adderley again starting at left cornerback.

The Cowboys Hall of Fame vice president of player personnel Gil Brandt said at the time of Adderley's death "He was such a great, great player. When we got him at the end of his career, he became the glue in our defensive backfield, the final piece to our first Super Bowl win".

In 1972, Adderley started only seven games, the first time he had started less than 12 games since 1961. Landry benched Adderley in favor of a young Charlie Waters during the middle of the 1972 season. Landry believed Adderly was no longer performing consistently.

Adderley had loved and admired Packer head coach Vince Lombardi, especially the equality with which he treated everyone; but reportedly loathed Cowboys head coach Tom Landry. However, in 1980 at his Hall of Fame induction ceremony, Adderley remarked "I would like to say to coach Tom Landry I appreciate the opportunity to have played in Dallas for those three years".

=== End of career ===
The Cowboys traded Adderley to the New England Patriots before the 1973 season. In late July 1973, the Patriots traded Adderley to the Los Angeles Rams, which pleased Adderley. It was contemporaneously reported that Adderley was scheduled to play in an early August preseason game for the Rams at safety, as Rams’ coach Chuck Knox was still determining who could play safety for the Rams that season. A few days after that game, the Rams released Adderley. One source, many years later, states Adderley opted not to report to the Rams and retired on August 7, after a dozen seasons in the NFL.

In his 12 seasons, Adderley recorded 48 interceptions, which he returned for 1,046 yards and seven touchdowns, an average of 21.8 yards per return. At the time he retired, he was tied for eighth all-time in career interceptions. He also recovered 14 fumbles (returning them for 65 yards) and returned 120 kickoffs for 3,080 yards and two touchdowns.

== Legacy ==
Adderley was inducted into the Pro Football Hall of Fame in 1980. He entered the Hall of Fame in 1980 with his former Cowboys' teammate Bob Lilly, who Adderley praised as among those at the top of all-time great tackles. A year after his induction in Canton, Adderley became a member of the Packer Hall of Fame in 1981. He was also chosen for the AFL-NFL 1960-1984 All-Star teams.

Along with the Patriots' Tom Brady who has won seven world championships, and two Packer teammates, offensive linemen Fuzzy Thurston (Packers and Colts) and Forrest Gregg (Packers and Cowboys) who won six each, Adderley is one of only four players in pro football history to play on at least six world championship teams. In a revised edition of Instant Replay, a memoir by Packer teammate Jerry Kramer, Adderley is quoted as saying, "I'm the only man with a Dallas Cowboys Super Bowl ring who doesn't wear it. I'm a Green Bay Packer." He is also quoted as saying he did not wear the Cowboys ring because "My loyalty, my commitment, my dedication and everything else is with the Packers . . . Nine years and five championship teams. We truly accomplished something special".

Adderley was the first NFL player ever to gain more than 1,000 interception return yards. Only eight other players have achieved this since then, and all of them did so with more interceptions than Adderley. He had five interceptions in 15 playoff games. Over his career, Adderley's teams were 127–46–5, a .713 winning percentage.

== NFL career statistics ==
Legend
	Won the NFL championship
	Won the Super Bowl
	Led the league
**Bold**	Career high

=== Regular season ===
Year	Team	Games		Interceptions					Fumbles				Returning				
Year	Team	GP	GS	Int	Yds	Y/I	Lng	TD	FR	Yds	Y/F	TD	Rt	Yds	Y/Rt	Lng	TD
1961	GB	**14**	1	1	9	9.0	9	0	0	0	—	0	18	478	26.6	61	0
1962	GB	**14**	**14**	**7**	132	18.9	50	1	**4**	15	3.8	0	15	418	27.9	**103** (Note: Led the league in regular season for longest kickoff return: 103.)	**1** (Note: Led the league in regular season for kickoffs returned for touchdowns: 1.)
1963	GB	**14**	**14**	5	86	17.2	39	0	0	0	—	0	**20**	**597**	**29.9**	98	**1**
1964	GB	13	13	4	56	14.0	35	0	1	18	**18.0**	0	19	508	26.7	43	0
1965	GB	**14**	**14**	6	175	29.2	44	**3**	3	2	0.7	0	11	221	20.1	33	0
1966	GB	**14**	**14**	4	125	31.3	68	1	2	0	0.0	0	14	320	22.9	65	0
1967	GB	**14**	**14**	4	16	4.0	12	1	1	0	0.0	0	10	207	20.7	37	0
1968	GB	**14**	**14**	3	27	9.0	17	0	2	**25**	12.5	0	14	331	23.6	50	0
1969	GB	**14**	**14**	5	169	**33.8**	**80**	1	0	0	—	0	0	0	—	0	0
1970	DAL	**14**	**14**	3	69	23.0	30	0	0	0	—	0	0	0	—	0	0
1971	DAL	12	12	6	**182**	30.3	46	0	0	0	—	0	0	0	—	0	0
1972	DAL	13	7	0	0	—	0	0	1	5	5.0	0	0	0	—	0	0
Career		164	145	48	1,046	21.8	80	7	14	65	4.6	0	121	3,080	25.5	103	2

=== Postseason ===
Year	Team	Games		Interceptions					Fumbles				Returning				
Year	Team	GP	GS	Int	Yds	Y/I	Lng	TD	FR	Yds	Y/F	TD	Rt	Yds	Y/Rt	Lng	TD
1961	GB	1	0	1	14	14.0	14	0	0	0	—	0	0	0	—	0	0
1962	GB	1	1	0	0	—	0	0	0	0	—	0	0	0	—	0	0
1965	GB	2	2	1	0	0.0	0	0	0	0	—	0	2	32	16.0	17	0
1966	GB	2	2	0	0	—	0	0	0	0	—	0	**5**	**105**	21.0	**26**	0
1967	GB	**3**	**3**	**2**	**75**	**37.5**	**60**	**1**	**1**	0	**0.0**	0	1	24	**24.0**	24	0
1970	DAL	**3**	**3**	0	0	—	0	0	0	0	—	0	0	0	—	0	0
1971	DAL	**3**	**3**	1	8	8.0	8	0	0	0	—	0	0	0	—	0	0
Career		15	14	5	97	19.4	60	1	1	0	0.0	0	8	161	20.1	26	0

== Awards and honors ==
Adderley has received the following awards and honors, among others;

- Inducted into Pro Football Hall of Fame (1980)
- Named 58th greatest player in The Athletic's NFL 100 greatest players of all time (2021)
- Named 45th greatest playing in The Sporting News 100 greatest players of all time (1999)
- No. 64 on The Top 100: NFL's Greatest Players
- Associated Press First-Team All-Pro (1962–1963, 1965–1966, 1969)
- Pro Bowl Selection (1963–1967)
- Named runner up at defensive back on NFL 50th Anniversary All Time Team (1969)
- Named to Packers 50th Anniversary Team (1969)
- Named to Packers All-Modern Era Team (1976)
- Inducted into Packers Hall of Fame (1981)
- Inducted into Michigan State University Athletics Hall of Fame (2022)
- Inducted into Michigan Sports Hall of Fame (1996)
- Named to All-Michigan State University Team (1970)
- Inducted into Philadelphia Sports Hall of Fame

== Broadcasting and coaching career ==
After Adderley retired, he returned to Philadelphia to broadcast football games for Temple University and the Philadelphia Eagles. He also coached as an assistant at Temple and with the Philadelphia Bell of the World Football League under head coach Willie Wood, a Packer teammate.

== Personal life and death ==
In 2007, Adderley became lead plaintiff in a class-action lawsuit against the NFL Players Association, for alleged non-payment of fees due under licensing and marketing agreements with the players, in connection with the use of the players' images in video games, and on trading cards and other items. In 2009, the case settled for $26.25 million.

Adderley's cousin's grandson (first cousin twice removed), Nasir Adderley, was drafted by the Los Angeles Chargers in the second round of the 2019 NFL draft. His first interception was against former Chargers Pro Bowl and All Pro quarterback Drew Brees.

Adderley died on October 30, 2020, at the age of 81.
