= Irv Goode =

American football player (born 1940)

No. 55
- Position: Guard

Personal information
- Born: October 12, 1940 (age 86); Newport, Kentucky, U.S.
- Listed height: 6 ft 5 in (1.96 m)
- Listed weight: 255 lb (116 kg)

Career information
- High school: Boone County ( Florence, Kentucky)
- College: Kentucky
- NFL draft: 1962: 1st round, 12th overall pick
- AFL draft: 1962: 4th round, 28th overall pick

Career history
- St. Louis Cardinals (1962–1971); Buffalo Bills (1972); Miami Dolphins (1973–1974)

Awards and highlights
- Super Bowl champion (VIII); 2× Pro Bowl (1964, 1967)

Career NFL statistics
- Games played: 162
- Games started: 132
- Fumble recoveries: 3
- Stats at Pro Football Reference

Irving Lee Goode (/ˈɡʊdiː/ GUUD-ee; born October 12, 1940) is an American former professional football player who was a guard for 13 seasons in the National Football League (NFL). He played college football for the Kentucky Wildcats and was selected by the St. Louis Cardinals in the first round of the 1962 NFL draft.

== Early life ==
Goode was born on October 12, 1940, in Newport, Kentucky. He attended Boone County High School. Goode was named a Sporting News High School All-American. The Louisville Courier-Journal named him all-conference and All-State in 1957.

In 1974, Boone County renamed its football field, Irv Goode Football Field. A parade was held in Florence, Kentucky as part of a weekend honoring Goode. In 2017, he was inducted into the Buddy LaRosa High School Sports Hall of Fame.

== College career ==
He played college football at the University of Kentucky from 1959 to 1962, where he played both offense (center) and defense (linebacker), under Wildcats coach Blanton Collier. He was a team captain in 1961, named a First Team All-American by Time, and selected by United Press International as Third Team All-Southeastern Conference. He played in four all-star games, including the Chicago Charities College All Star Game. As a junior, he had 23 tackles in a single game against national champion University of Mississippi.

== Professional career ==
The St. Louis Cardinals drafted Goode 12th overall in the first round of the 1962 NFL draft. He was also drafted by the Dallas Texans (which became the Kansas City Chiefs) of the American Football League in the fourth round of the 1962 AFL draft. Goode chose to play for the Cardinals, but the Texans went to court in an effort to force Goode to play for the Texans; with a judge ultimately ruling in the Cardinals' favor.

The Cardinals drafted Goode as a center, but injury and circumstances led them to play Bob DeMarco at center during training camp in 1962, while moving Goode to starting offensive tackle. He was the 1962 Cardinals Rookie of the Year.

During his NFL career, Goode would start at tackle and guard (principally playing guard), was a long snapper, and also served as a backup center. He spent his first two seasons at left tackle, and then was moved to left guard. He was named to the Pro Bowl team in 1964 and 1967. In 1967, three other offensive lineman from the Cardinals, Bob DeMarco (center), Ken Gray (right guard), and Ernie McMillan (right tackle), along with Cardinals Hall of Fame tight end Jackie Smith, were all selected to the Pro Bowl. During the 1960s, Goode and his linemates (including left tackle Bob Reynolds) were selected to a total of 18 Pro Bowls. He played for the Cardinals from 1962 to 1971.

He was traded to the Buffalo Bills before the 1972 season in exchange for guard Joe O'Donnell, after a contract dispute with the Cardinals. Goode missed the entire 1972 season after suffering a knee injury during the preseason. He was traded to the Miami Dolphins before the 1973 season in exchange for defensive tackle Mike Kadish, who had been Miami's first round draft pick the prior season. He served as the Dolphins long snapper for field goals and extra points, as well as a backup offensive lineman, for the Dolphins Super Bowl VIII champion team in 1973. After receiving little playing time in 1974, Goode retired prior to the 1975 season.

== Honors ==
In 2005, Goode was in the charter class of the University of Kentucky Athletics Hall of Fame. In 2013, Goode was inducted into the Kentucky Pro Football Hall of Fame. In 2018, he was inducted into the Missouri Sports Hall of Fame. He has also been inducted into the St. Louis Sports Hall of Fame, and been named a Legend of the Southeastern Conference. Boone County High School has named its football field Irv Goode Field.
