= Dave Robinson (American football) =

American football player (born 1941)

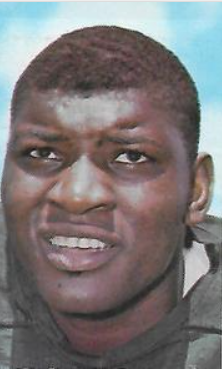
- Robinson on 1969 stamp

No. 89
- Position: Linebacker

Personal information
- Born: May 3, 1941 (age 85); Mount Holly, New Jersey, U.S.
- Listed height: 6 ft 3 in (1.91 m)
- Listed weight: 245 lb (111 kg)

Career information
- High school: Moorestown (Moorestown, New Jersey)
- College: Penn State
- NFL draft: 1963: 1st round, 14th overall pick
- AFL draft: 1963: 3rd round, 17th overall pick

Career history
- Green Bay Packers (1963–1972); Washington Redskins (1973–1974)

Awards and highlights
- 3× NFL champion (1965–1967); 2× Super Bowl champion (I, II); 3× First-team All-Pro (1967–1969); 3× Pro Bowl (1966, 1967, 1969); NFL 1960s All-Decade Team; Green Bay Packers Hall of Fame; First-team All-American (1962); First-team All-East (1962)

Career NFL statistics
- Interceptions: 27
- Fumble recoveries: 12
- Touchdowns: 1
- Sacks: 28.5
- Stats at Pro Football Reference
- Pro Football Hall of Fame
- College Football Hall of Fame

Richard David Robinson (born May 3, 1941) is an American former professional football player who was a linebacker in the National Football League (NFL). He played college football for the Penn State Nittany Lions and professionally for the Green Bay Packers and the Washington Redskins. Robinson was inducted into the College Football Hall of Fame in 1997 and the Pro Football Hall of Fame in 2013.

== Early life ==
Robinson, the youngest child of Leslie Robinson and his wife, Mary Gaines, lived in Mount Laurel, New Jersey for the first 18 years of his life. Robinson is a 1959 graduate of Moorestown High School and a member of three unbeaten NJSIAA championship teams:

- 1957 South Jersey Group III championship football team, with a record of 9–0,
- 1958 State Group III championship basketball team, with a record of 22–0,
- 1959 State Group III championship basketball team, with a record of 22–0.

Robinson earned the name "Lefty" because he was a left-footed kicker.

== College career ==
From 1960 to 1962, Robinson played end on offense and defense at Penn State University. The Nittany Lions' record was 24–8 under the guidance of head coach Rip Engle and assistant coach Joe Paterno. Robinson's honors in 1962 included: All-America status, College Player of the Year from the Newark Athletic Club, and College Lineman of the Year from the Philadelphia Sports Writers Association.

In 1962, during his senior year, Robinson led Penn State to a 9–1 regular- season, made 17 receptions for 178 yards and was named a first-team All-America by the Associated Press, NEA, Football Writers (Look), Post and Time magazines. The first-team All-East choice also was named the nation's top collegiate lineman by the Philadelphia Sportswriters.

Robinson was the MVP of the 1962 Gator Bowl, despite the Nittany Lions' loss to Florida. He was inducted into the Gator Bowl Hall of Fame in 1996.

Robinson was inducted into the College Football Hall of Fame in 1997.

Robinson is among 22 members of the Penn State football family who are enshrined into the National Football Foundation and College Hall of Fame (1997). He was inducted into the Green Bay Packers Hall of Fame in 1982.

Robinson earned his degree in Civil Engineering at Penn State University. He also minored in economics.

== Professional career ==
Robinson was selected by the Packers in the first round of the 1963 NFL draft and by the San Diego Chargers in the third round of the AFL draft. He was also drafted by the Montreal Alouettes of the Canadian Football League (CFL). Originally, he did not think he would end up playing in Green Bay. The Chargers had a financial package of $38,000 for Robinson but ran out of money and were going to trade his AFL rights to the Buffalo Bills. Robinson's fiancée (and future wife) Elaine had been to Buffalo and knew how cold it was there, but had never been to Green Bay. Robinson would later recall that she didn't join him there until his second year in the NFL.

Robinson made his NFL debut on September 15, 1963, against the Chicago Bears. The Packers decided to move Robinson from defensive end to linebacker. After backing up incumbent Dan Currie during his rookie season, Robinson became the starting left side linebacker for the Packers and remained in that role through 1972. Alongside the immortal MLB Ray Nitschke and Pro Bowler Lee Roy Caffey, the three formed one of the best starting units of linebackers in NFL history. Robinson was not only adept at defending the run but also against the pass. He intercepted 21 passes as a Packer, including five in 1966, which tied cornerback Bob Jeter for the team lead. Robinson played on two Super Bowl Championship teams, and won a total of three NFL titles with the Packers (1965, 1966, 1967). During that time, he developed a reputation as a big-game player. Perhaps the most notable example came in the 1966 NFL Championship game against the Dallas Cowboys. On a fourth down play from the Packers' two-yard-line, Robinson pressured Cowboys quarterback Don Meredith into a desperation pass that was intercepted by safety Tom Brown in the end zone, preserving a 34–27 victory by the Packers. Despite this, Vince Lombardi, the future Hall of Fame head coach of the Packers, was not pleased that Robinson had freelanced on the play and gave him the coach's lowest grade possible, a minus two. However, Lombardi would later privately praise Robinson for making the game-winning play.

"Trying to pass over Robinson, with his arms and reaction, is like trying to pass over the Empire State Building."
Jack Christiansen

After Lombardi's retirement as Packers' head coach following Super Bowl II, the aging team went into a period of decline under new coach (and former defensive coordinator) Phil Bengtson. Individually, Robinson continued to shine. He was named 1st Team All-Pro by the NEA and UPI in 1968. In 1969, he was again named 1st Team All-Pro by the NEA and UPI and was also chosen for the 1st Teams of the New York Daily News, PFW and The Sporting News. Robinson suffered a setback during the 1970 season when he tore his Achilles tendon, but was ready for the start of the 1971 season. By then, Bengtson had been replaced as Packers' head coach by Dan Devine. Robinson did not get along with Devine and would later state that, while he felt that Vince Lombardi was the best coach he ever played for, Devine was his worst coach at any level: high school, college, or pros. Although the team rebounded from a 4–8–2 record in Devine's first season to finish 10–4 and win the NFC Central Divisional title, the 1972 season would be Robinson's last in a Packers uniform.

Robinson concluded his career with the Washington Redskins in 1973 and 1974, playing under another future Hall of Fame head coach in George Allen. He later stated that he was fine with the trade to the Redskins because there was no way that he would play for Devine anymore. Robinson continued his high level of play in D.C., intercepting four passes during his first season with the Redskins. On October 14, 1973, Robinson returned one of those four interceptions 28 yards for the only touchdown of his career during a 21–3 Redskins win over the New York Giants. Robinson retired from the NFL in August 1975 after a career of twelve professional seasons. He finished his career with 27 interceptions for return yardage totaling 449 and the one aforementioned touchdown. He also recovered 12 fumbles. Robinson was named to three Pro Bowls in 1966, 1967, and 1969 and was selected for one of the linebacker spots on the NFL's all-decade team for the 1960s. In 1982, he was inducted into the Green Bay Packers Hall of Fame. In 2004, he was named to the Professional Football Researchers Association Hall of Very Good in the association's second HOVG class.

== After football ==
Robinson has pursued many different endeavors since retiring as an NFL player. During his career, he had worked in the off-season as an engineer at Campbell's Soup in Camden, New Jersey through 1967 and then for Schlitz Brewery in Milwaukee. He then worked full-time with Schlitz upon his retirement from pro football. In April 1984, he started his own beer distributorship in Akron, Ohio until semi-retiring in 2001. He then worked in sales for an artificial turf company before officially retiring in 2006. Robinson was also a member of the board of directors for the Pro Football Hall of Fame. Robinson was the sixth Nittany Lion in history of the program to be inducted into the Pro Football Hall of Fame.

Robinson and Royce Boyles co-authored The Lombardi Legacy: Thirty People Who Were Touched By Greatness. In 2009, the second edition of the book was published by Goose Creek Publishers.

In addition to being a member of the College Football and Gator Bowl Halls of Fame, Robinson was also inducted into the Packers Hall of Fame in February 1982.

=== Pro Football Hall of Fame induction ===
Robinson was elected as part of the 2013 class for the Pro Football Hall of Fame on February 2, 2013.

With his election, Robinson became the 12th member of Vince Lombardi's championship Green Bay Packers, including Lombardi himself, to be enshrined in the Pro Football Hall of Fame. He was also the sixth Penn State Nittany Lion to be honored in the Professional Football Hall of Fame in Canton, joining Jack Ham, Franco Harris, Mike Michalske, Lenny Moore and Mike Munchak.

In 2011, Robinson was faced with a different struggle in his life. He was told that he may have pancreatic cancer which is 98% deadly. He said "I had a brother die of pancreatic cancer. I know the odds of pancreatic cancer. I went home and started making plans for my demise." After his doctors appointment, Robinson received the news that he did not have pancreatic cancer; however he did have colon cancer and 80% blockage of one of his major arteries. But, after two months spending a lot of time in the hospital, the doctors gave Robinson news that he was cancer free and did not have to receive chemotherapy. After going through this life altering time, Robinson told reporters, "I am here for a purpose."

In September 2013, Moorestown High School retired Robinson's old jersey, number 89. This made Robinson the only Moorestown player to ever receive such an honor.
