= Chuck Drulis =

American football player and coach (1918–1972)

No. 18
- Positions: Guard; Head coach

Personal information
- Born: March 8, 1918; Girardville, Pennsylvania, U.S.
- Died: August 23, 1972 (aged 54); Little Rock, Arkansas, U.S.

Career information
- College: Temple

Career history

Playing
- Chicago Bears (1942, 1945–1949); Green Bay Packers (1950)

Coaching
- Green Bay Packers (1951–1953) Line coach; Philadelphia Eagles (1954–1955) Line coach; Chicago Cardinals (1956–1957) Defensive line; Chicago Cardinals (1958–1960) Defensive assistant; St. Louis Cardinals (1961) Head coach; St. Louis Cardinals (1962–1970, 1972) Defensive coordinator; St. Louis Cardinals (1971) Defensive backs

Head coaching record
- Regular season: 2–0
- Postseason: 0–0
- Career: 2–0
- Coaching profile at Pro Football Reference

Charles John Drulis (March 8, 1918 – August 23, 1972) was an American football player and coach born in Girardville, Pennsylvania. He attended Temple University and played seven seasons in the National Football League (NFL). Drulis, along with his brothers Joe and Albert, who also played in the NFL, was elected into the Pennsylvania Sports Hall of Fame.

Drulis made his professional debut in the NFL in 1942 with the Chicago Bears but spent the next two-and-a-half seasons in military service during World War II. He returned to the Bears in 1945 and played there until 1949. Drulis spent his final season with the Green Bay Packers.

Drulis went on to spend many years as a defensive assistant. During his tenure as secondary coach of the St. Louis Cardinals, Drulis devised a play that called for one of the safeties to take part in a blitz, code-named "Wildcat." He believed this would result in severe pressure on the quarterback, since a blitz by a defensive back is not usually anticipated. However, at first he didn't think he had a player with the athleticism to run the play. That changed during training camp in 1960, when the Cardinals signed a cornerback from Utah named Larry Wilson. Drulis believed he'd found the player he needed for his scheme, and persuaded the Cardinals to convert Wilson to free safety. Largely due to the play, Wilson blossomed into one of the greatest defensive players in NFL history, and became so identified with it that "Wildcat" became his nickname.

After Pop Ivy resigned late in the 1961 season, Drulis shared head coaching duties with fellow assistant coaches Ray Prochaska and Ray Willsey. Under the trio's guidance, the team won its last two games.

Chuck's wife, Dale Drulis, was an artist who was commissioned to create the artwork at the Pro Football Hall of Fame in Canton, Ohio. The 3 hammered copper figures over the entry depict a running back with a blocker and tackler in an action scene. Dale used her husband Chuck and her sons Chuck and Kerry as models for the figures in the sculpture.

On August 23, 1972, Drulis suffered a massive heart attack aboard the chartered flight transporting the Cardinals to Houston for an exhibition game vs. the Oilers the next night. Drulis was pronounced dead before the plane made an emergency landing at Little Rock National Airport. The exhibition went on as scheduled, with the Oilers winning 33–24.
