= Chuck Walker (American football) =

American football player (born 1941)

No. 79
- Positions: Defensive tackle, Defensive end

Personal information
- Born: August 10, 1941 (age 85); Uniontown, Pennsylvania, U.S.
- Listed height: 6 ft 3 in (1.91 m)
- Listed weight: 250 lb (113 kg)

Career information
- High school: North Catholic (Cranberry Township, Pennsylvania)
- College: Duke
- NFL draft: 1963: 12th round, 157th overall pick
- AFL draft: 1963: 22nd round, 172nd overall pick

Career history
- St. Louis Cardinals (1964–1972); Atlanta Falcons (1972-1975)

Awards and highlights
- Second-team All-Pro (1967); Pro Bowl (1966); First-team All-ACC (1963)

Career NFL statistics
- Fumble recoveries: 17
- Interceptions: 1
- Sacks: 53.5
- Stats at Pro Football Reference

Charles David Walker (born August 10, 1941) is an American former professional football player who was a defensive tackle for 12 seasons in the National Football League (NFL) for the St. Louis Cardinals and the Atlanta Falcons.

Walker played college football for the Duke Blue Devils and was the Cardinals' twelfth-round selection in the 1963 NFL draft. Walker earned Pro Bowl honors in 1966 and his best season came in 1967 when he led the Cardinals with 12 sacks. He led the NFL with five fumble recoveries in 1969. Walker has the seventh most sacks in Cardinals history with 50.5.

Walker was traded to Atlanta in 1972 where he was a key defensive contributor during the Falcons' first winning season, in 1973.
