= Larry Wilson (American football) =

American football player, coach, and executive (1938–2020)

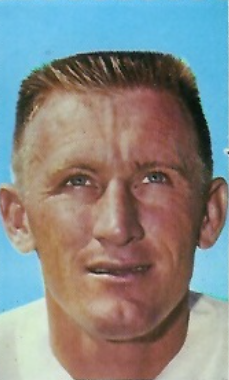
- Wilson displayed on a Glendale stamp, 1969

No. 8
- Position: Safety

Personal information
- Born: March 24, 1938; Rigby, Idaho, U.S.
- Died: September 17, 2020 (aged 82); Scottsdale, Arizona, U.S.
- Listed height: 6 ft 0 in (1.83 m)
- Listed weight: 190 lb (86 kg)

Career information
- High school: Rigby (Rigby, Idaho)
- College: Utah (1956-1959)
- NFL draft: 1960: 7th round, 74th overall pick
- AFL draft: 1960

Career history

Playing
- St. Louis Cardinals (1960–1972)

Coaching
- St. Louis Cardinals (1973) Defensive backs; St. Louis Cardinals (1979) Interim head coach

Operations
- St. Louis Cardinals (1973–1976) Scouting director; St. Louis Cardinals (1977–1987) Personnel director; Phoenix Cardinals (1988–1993) VP & general manager; Arizona Cardinals (1994–2002) VP

Awards and highlights
- NFL Defensive Player of the Year (1966); 6× First-team All-Pro (1963, 1966–1970); Second-team All-Pro (1965); 8× Pro Bowl (1962, 1963, 1965–1970); NFL interceptions leader (1966); NFL 1960s All-Decade Team; NFL 1970s All-Decade Team; NFL 75th Anniversary All-Time Team; NFL 100th Anniversary All-Time Team; Arizona Cardinals Ring of Honor; Arizona Cardinals No. 8 retired

Career NFL statistics
- Interceptions: 52
- Interception yards: 800
- Fumble recoveries: 14
- Safeties: 1
- Total touchdowns: 8
- Stats at Pro Football Reference

Head coaching record
- Career: 2–1 (.667)
- Coaching profile at Pro Football Reference
- Executive profile at Pro Football Reference
- Pro Football Hall of Fame

Lawrence Frank Wilson (March 24, 1938 – September 17, 2020) was an American professional football safety who played 13 years with the St. Louis Cardinals of the National Football League (NFL). Wilson was an eight-time Pro Bowl selection, and first or second-team All-Pro in seven seasons, at free safety. During the 1960s, Wilson became the leading player in developing and using the safety blitz as a means to disrupt opponents' offenses. He was nicknamed "Wildcat", after the Cardinals' name for their safety blitz play.

Wilson was inducted into the Pro Football Hall of Fame in 1978, in his first year of eligibility. He was named to the NFL 75th Anniversary All-Time Team in 1994, and was named to the NFL 100th Anniversary All-Time Team in 2019. He received numerous other honors at every level; from his high school, at the collegiate level, and in the NFL.

Wilson ranks 26th all-time in interceptions. In 1966, he led the NFL in interceptions while tying the record for interceptions in consecutive games (seven); and received the first George Halas Cup as defensive player of the year. Wilson had three interceptions in a single game twice (with interception returns for touchdowns in each of those games); famously had an interception in 1965 while playing a game against the Pittsburgh Steelers with casts on both of his broken hands; and in 1966 made a spectacular one-handed interception against the Philadelphia Eagles which he then returned 91 yards for a touchdown, that later was selected as one of the top 100 plays in NFL history.

Wilson played his entire 13-year career with the Cardinals and remained with the team in coaching, scouting, and executive capacities until 2003, long after the team moved to Phoenix in the 1988 season. He is a member of the Cardinals Ring of Honor, and the team retired his jersey No. 8 at the end of the 1972 season after Wilson announced his retirement. Wilson played college football for the University of Utah Utes; and was inducted into the school's athletic hall of fame in 1985.

== Early life ==
Wilson was born on March 24, 1938, in Rigby, Idaho, where he grew up. Wilson’s mother died when he was a child and his father raised Wilson and his brother. Wilson helped raise his younger brother, with his father out of the house as a truck driver at times. As a teen, he worked long days harvesting potatoes.

Wilson attended Rigby High School. He earned 16 varsity sports letters, and the football team won a state championship. Wilson also set state records in the high jump and high hurdles. In 1956, he was the state champion in both the 120–yard high hurdles and 180–yard low hurdles.

=== High school honors ===
A Hometown Hall of Famer plaque in Wilson's honor now hangs at Rigby High School, noting his accomplishments. This was presented by the Pro Football Hall of Fame in a 2012 ceremony at Rigby. The school’s stadium was named for Wilson until relocating, after which Wilson was honored with a $20,000 monument in 2021 at the new stadium site. During the 2021 ceremony, the chair of the committee to honor Wilson observed the lack of hate and divisiveness in his nature and stated, "'It doesn’t matter what your politics are or what your religion is, (honoring a man like Larry Wilson) is something we can all come together on and I think that is so important for our community'".

Wilson's high school jersey No. 7 has been permanently retired. The Larry Wilson Sharpening the Axe Award is given annually to one offensive and one defensive player on Rigby's football team. A scholarship is given annually in Wilson’s name to one senior based on a number of factors, including that the student reflects Wilson’s qualities of kindness, humility, and having the respect of peers.

== College career ==
Wilson attended the University of Utah from 1956 to 1959, where he got a degree in physical education and obtained a teaching certificate. He played college football for the Utes in the Skyline Conference, where he was a two-way starter at halfback and cornerback under head coaches Jack Curtice and Ray Nagel.

As a sophomore in 1957, Wilson rushed for 152 yards on 51 carries, and had nine pass receptions for 122 yards and three receiving touchdowns. As a junior, he rushed for 489 yards with three rushing touchdowns. Wilson's six yards per carry average was seventh best nationally in 1958. He also had a team-leading 13 receptions for 256 yards and one receiving touchdown. Wilson's quarterback in 1957 and 1958 was All-American and future NFL quarterback, and sports broadcaster, Lee Grosscup.

As a senior in 1959, Wilson rushed for 559 yards, averaging 5.7 yards per carry; and his eight rushing touchdowns were tied for eighth best nationally. He also had 21 receptions for 215 yards and four receiving touchdowns. In a late October 1959 game against the Arizona Wildcats, Wilson rushed for three touchdowns, caught two touchdown passes, and ran for a two-point conversion, in setting a school record at the time for most points in a game. During the 1959 season, Ute head coach Nagel stated that Wilson was equally skilled on both offense and defense, but would likely become a defensive back in the NFL. Nagel observed that "'Larry is one of the finest defensive backs in the nation. He is plenty fast enough to take care of most performers on pass defense, he is a fine blocker, and a savage tackler. He's a great all-around football player'".

In 1959, Wilson was a third-team All-American and first-team All-Skyline Conference at running back. The Associated Press (AP) and United Press International (UPI) named Wilson an honorable mention All-American in 1959. Wilson was named a third-team 1959 Williamson All-American. The AP and UPI named Wilson first-team All-Skyline Conference in 1959; the AP stating that the conference coaches rated Wilson highly as a defensive player, blocker, and running back. He was selected to play in the January 1960 East West Shrine Game.

During his three-year Ute career, Wilson rushed for 1,200 yards with 11 rushing touchdowns, had eight more touchdowns as a receiver, and averaged 26.1 yards per kickoff return. Wilson played more minutes for the Utes than any player in school history. He was inducted into Utah's Crimson Club Hall of Fame in 1985. He was the first Utah player ever inducted into the Pro Football Hall of Fame.

== Professional career ==
Despite his skill and adaptability, Wilson's small size (he was only six feet tall) resulted in him not being selected until the seventh round of the 1960 NFL draft by the Chicago Cardinals. The draft was held in November 1959, and the franchise moved to St. Louis before the start of the 1960 season. Wilson was chosen by the Buffalo Bills in the first American Football League draft.

During his first Cardinals' training camp, Wilson was unsuccessful at running back and cornerback, and was in danger of being cut from the Cardinals roster. In his first preseason game at cornerback Wilson was assigned to cover the Baltimore Colts' Hall of Fame receiver Raymond Berry; and was benched after giving up three touchdowns. Looking back on that day as he was retiring in 1972, Wilson said it might have been the lowest moment of his life and was sure the team would cut him. Cardinals Defensive coordinator Chuck Drulis was going to cut Wilson, but cornerback Jimmy Hill convinced Drulis to keep Wilson on the team at safety, telling Drulis that Wilson had more desire than anyone Hill had ever seen. Drulis and head coach Frank "Pop" Ivy moved Wilson to safety in the final preseason game and he had two interceptions against the San Francisco 49ers; and Wilson made the team at free safety.

Wilson started 11 of the Cardinals 12 games his rookie year (1960) at free safety. He had two interceptions that season, and also returned three punts and six kickoffs. Wilson referred to himself as the "weak side safety" in the Cardinals' system. He found that the term "free safety" belied the fact that he generally had defined defensive assignments; and was not typically free to decide what to do on defense.

=== Safety blitz (1961) ===
Drulis, working with Ivy, developed the "safety blitz" with the Cardinals in 1960. Wilson later called it Drulis's brainchild. This involved a safety rushing the line of scrimmage as soon as the ball was snapped instead of retreating to defend against the pass, in an attempt to sack or pressure the quarterback before the ball was thrown. Wilson stated that it was the coach's decision when the play would be used, and the safeties themselves did not decide when to blitz.

The play was risky because if the blitzing safety was blocked then there would be an opening in the defensive backfield for the quarterback to complete a pass. To succeed, the safety blitz required high defensive skills and accurate timing of the safety. Drulis and Ivy first tried the safety blitz in 1960, using the Cardinals 1960 All-Pro safety Jerry Norton in the scheme. When the Cardinals first ran the safety blitz, the pressure was severe since most teams did not (and still do not) expect a defensive back to take part in a pass rush. This single play also helped to set up today's defenses where a blitz can come from anywhere.

Drulis became the Cardinals' head coach in 1961. He expanded use of the safety blitz, which Drulis decided would feature Wilson and his skill set. In the opening game of the 1961 NFL season against the New York Giants, Wilson sacked quarterback Charley Conerly twice on safety blitzes, and kept pressure on Conerly throughout the game; disrupting the Giants' offense in an upset victory for the Cardinals. This was Allie Sherman's first game as the Giants' head coach, and he was so surprised by the tactic that he looked to the officials for relief. He later said "'We're on offense and here comes Larry Wilson. He's playing free safety and he's rushing Y. A. Tittle. Pretty soon they had four, five, six and seven guys rushing'". After the game, he and his coaches immediately began to plan against these blitzes.

Over two decades later, Sherman recollected that the Giants were not hurt by the Cardinals' safety blitz after that first game. However, playing against the Giants again less than one month later in early October 1961, Wilson sacked Connerly for long losses twice. In that same game, Wilson also blocked a punt out of the end zone for a safety and intercepted a pass that he returned 25 yards. Over the course of that season, Wilson started all 11 games in which he played, with three interceptions, three fumble recoveries, multiple sacks, and a safety.

Wilson transformed the nature of the safety position with his aggressive play, and would be known for the safety blitz throughout his career. As stated by the Pro Football Hall of Fame biographical note on Wilson, Wilson "did not invent the safety blitz, but he did capitalize on the maneuver to a degree not reached by any other pro player of the decade". In 1966, Wilson said "'The safety blitz is the only thing new to come along in the last six years . . . I'm very proud to have been a part of it. We sometimes call the maneuver 'Wildcat' and, as a result, I picked up the nickname 'Wildcat'".

=== Beginning of Pro Bowl/All Pro career ===
In 1962, Drulis went back to the role of defensive coordinator and Wally Lemm became the Cardinals' new head coach; with the team having a 4–9–1 record. Drulis would remain Wilson's defensive coordinator for the remainder of their Cardinals' careers. Wilson started all 14 games for the first time, and had two interceptions, a fumble recovery, and five sacks. He was selected to play in the Pro Bowl for the first time. In a late October game against the Dallas Cowboys, Wilson intercepted an Eddie LeBaron pass and returned it 57 yards for a touchdown.

In 1963, the Cardinals had a 9–5 record. Wilson started all 14 games, and had four interceptions and two fumble recoveries. Wilson returned one fumble 42 yards for a touchdown against the Philadelphia Eagles late in the season. His 42 return yards on fumble recoveries led the NFL that season. Wilson was selected to play in the Pro Bowl for a second consecutive season; and was named first-team All-Pro by United Press International (UPI) and second-team All-Pro by the Newspaper Enterprise Association (NEA).

Jerry Stovall joined the Cardinals as their strong safety in 1963; and would play alongside Wilson for most of the next nine seasons. Wilson and Stovall are considered one the best safety pairs in NFL history. In 1963, Wilson also became the ball holder for field goals and extra points. In the final game of the 1963 NFL season, against the Dallas Cowboys, Wilson ran a fake field goal play 35 yards for a touchdown.

In 1964, Wilson again started all 14 games for a 9–3–2 Cardinals team. He had three interceptions, one fumble recovery, and four sacks. Wilson intercepted a King Hill pass against the Philadelphia Eagles on November 22, and returned it 42 yards for a touchdown.

=== Broken hands season (1965) ===
In 1965, Wilson played in only 10 games (all starts), with six interceptions and one sack. He missed four games after suffering broken bones in each hand that eventually required surgery. Despite that, he was selected to play in the Pro Bowl, and UPI named him second-team All-Pro.

Wilson suffered broken bones in each hand during separate incidents in an October 31, 1965 game against the New York Giants. He played the following week against the Pittsburgh Steelers with protective casts on both hands; but still intercepted a Bill Nelsen pass and returned it 34 yards; setting up a touchdown. Wilson then missed four games during Weeks 10 to 13 of the 1965 NFL season, after having surgery on his hands. Even though his broken hands had not fully healed, Wilson returned to play in the Cardinals' last regular season game against the Cleveland Browns. In that game, Wilson had three interceptions against Frank Ryan, including the longest interception return of the NFL season; a 95- or 96-yard return for a touchdown, that also set a Cardinals' record. Wilson also recovered a fumble in that game.

At the end of Wilson's career in 1972, St. Louis sportswriter Joe Pollock (who had seen every one of Wilson's NFL games) wrote that Wilson's play during this two-month period raised him to a legendary status in the NFL; specifically intercepting a pass with two broken hands and then returning from surgery to intercept three passes, and returning one nearly the entire length of the football field for a touchdown. When Wilson died nearly 55 years later, his New York Times obituary included his interception with broken hands as one of Wilson's defining accomplishments.

=== Defensive player of the year (1966) ===
During 1966, Wilson had at least one interception in seven consecutive games, tying an NFL record at the time, en route to a 10-interception season that led his league. The Cardinals were 8–5–1 that season under new head coach Charley Winner. In an early October game against the Philadelphia Eagles, Wilson made a one-handed interception of a Norm Snead pass and then returned it 91 yards for a touchdown. His one-handed interception and 91-yard return for a touchdown was selected as one of the hundred greatest plays in NFL history.

On Monday, October 31, 1966, Wilson had three interceptions against the Chicago Bears and Rudy Bukich, including a 29-yard interception return for a touchdown. This was one of the NFL's first widely broadcast Monday night football games. After the game, coach Winner said of Wilson "'He's played great football all year . . . I don't think he's capable of playing a bad game'"; and Bears' Hall of Fame coach George Halas, who had been an important part of the NFL since its inception in 1920, called Wilson one the NFL's greatest defensive players ever. The Cardinals honored Wilson before the final game of the 1966 NFL season with a Larry Wilson Day.

In 1966, Wilson was voted defensive player of the year in the NEA poll of NFL players, receiving the first annual George Halas Cup for that honor. Wilson was named first-team All-Pro by the Associated Press (AP), the Pro Football Writers of America, the NEA, the New York Daily News, and UPI, and was second in Most Valuable Player voting to Green Bay Packers' quarterback Bart Starr. Starr played on a 12–2 team that went on to win the first Super Bowl, while Wilson's Cardinals did not make the playoffs.

Wilson started all 14 games at free safety in 1967, with four interceptions and 4.5 sacks. He was again named to the Pro Bowl, and was named first-team All Pro by the AP and NEA, and second-team All-Pro by UPI. Future Hall of Fame Green Bay Packers' guard Jerry Kramer described Wilson's play during an October 30, 1967 game against the Cardinals: "he fired up their whole team ... (h)is enthusiasm was infectious."

In 1968, the Cardinals were 9–4–1. Wilson again started all 14 games, and had four interceptions. He was again selected to play in the Pro Bowl, and was named first-team All-Pro by the AP, NEA, Pro Football Weekly, and UPI; as well as first-team All-AFL/NFL by the Pro Football Writers of American and Pro Football Weekly. In 1969, Wilson started all 14 games, with two interceptions, a fumble recovery, and one sack. In the Cardinals' final game of the 1969 NFL regular season, against the Green Bay Packers, Wilson returned a fumble 88 yards for a touchdown; the longest fumble return in the NFL that season. Wilson was again selected to play in the Pro Bowl, and was named first-team All-Pro by the AP, NEA, Pro Football Weekly and UPI; and All-AFL/NFL by the Pro Football Writers and the Hall of Fame.

Wilson started 13 games in 1970, with five interceptions, one fumble recovery, and 1.5 sacks. He was selected to play in the Pro Bowl for the eighth and final time of his career. He was named first-team All-Pro by the AP, NEA, Pro Football Writers, and Pro Football Weekly. In 1971, Wilson played at both free safety and strong safety, starting 13 games, with four interceptions. Wilson finished his career in 1972 playing strong safety; starting all 12 games in which he appeared, with three interceptions.

During the week before the final game of the 1972 NFL season, Wilson announced that he would be retiring at the end of the season; and during the same news conference the Cardinals announced they would be retiring his No. 8 jersey. At the time he retired Wilson held 10 Cardinals' records. He ended his NFL career with 52 career interceptions for 800 yards and five touchdowns; 14 fumble recoveries for 173 yards and 2 more touchdowns; as well as a rushing touchdown on offense. Wilson is the Cardinals career leader in interceptions.

== Legacy and honors ==
Wilson was inducted into the Pro Football Hall of Fame in 1978, in his first year of eligibility. This made him one of five Hall of Famers to have never played in the postseason. Wilson was named to the NFL 75th Anniversary All-Time Team in 1994 and was named to the NFL 100th Anniversary All-Time Team in 2019. In 1969, he was named runner up at safety on the NFL 50th Anniversary All-Time Team. He was a member of the NFL’s 1960s All-Decade Team. He was also named to the NFL 1970s All-Decade Team, after the American Football League merged into the NFL.

In 1999, he was ranked No. 43 on The Sporting News' list of the 100 Greatest Football Players, making him the highest-ranked player to have played a majority of his career with the Cardinals. The team has also retired his uniform No. 8. Wilson is a member of the Cardinals Ring of Honor. He was inducted into the Missouri Sports Hall of Fame in 2000, and is also a member of the St. Louis Sports Hall of Fame.

During his career, Wilson was named first- or second-team All-Pro seven times and represented the Cardinals on eight Pro Bowl teams. Among other entities selecting All-Pro teams, the AP selected Wilson first-team All-Pro from 1966 to 1969, and UPI selected him as first-team All-Pro in 1963, 1966, 1968 and 1969, and second-team All-Pro in 1965 and 1967. He is tied for 26th in NFL history all-time in interceptions.

Wilson is one of the few players to have played in the NFL for at least 10 years without having taken part in an official playoff game. The closest he came to postseason play was in 1964, when the Cardinals played in and won the Playoff Bowl, a postseason third-place game. Although it counted as a playoff game at the time, it has since been retconned as an exhibition. The 1964 season was also one of only five winning seasons the Cardinals had during his 13-year career.

In 2020, his October 2, 1966 one-handed interception and 91 yard return for a touchdown was selected as one of the hundred greatest plays in NFL history. In 1966, he was one of only four non-quarterbacks to receive votes for most valuable player. The Newspaper Enterprise Association (NEA) named him Defensive Player of the Year in 1966. In 2007, NFL Network ranked him ninth on its list of the "Top 10 Draft Steals" in NFL history.

Fellow Idahoan Jerry Kramer, a guard for the Green Bay Packers and author of Instant Replay, called Wilson "the finest football player in the NFL". Hall of Fame quarterback Bobby Layne said that pound-for-pound, Wilson was the NFL's greatest player. When Wilson broke Dallas Cowboy quarterback Don Meredith's streak of 156 passes without an interception in October 1966, Cowboys' running back Dan Reeves said "'You have the greatest free safety in the game in Larry Wilson – and I hope you know it'". On the September 18, 2006 edition of SportsCenter,, Mike Ditka challenged Terrell Owens' toughness in not playing for 2–4 weeks due to a broken finger. Ditka cited Wilson's 1965 interception with casts on both hands as proof of a tougher football player.

In 1967, Rigby, Idaho honored Wilson with a Larry Wilson Day.

== Executive and scouting career ==
Following his retirement as a player, Wilson was named the Cardinals' secondary coach and director of scouting. He stepped down as secondary coach after the 1973 season. He was the Cardinals’ director of pro scouting from 1973 to 1976, and director of pro personnel from 1977 to 1988. In 1977, Wilson was named the Cardinals' general manager, a post he would hold (under various titles) for the next 17 years. He also served as interim head coach in 1979 after the dismissal of Bud Wilkinson. In 1988, Wilson became the first general manager of the relocated Arizona Cardinals, adding the title of vice president after the team's move to Arizona. He stepped down as general manager in 1993, but remained as vice president until his retirement after the 2002 season.

== NFL career statistics ==
Legend
	NFL Defensive Player of the Year
	Led the league
**Bold**	Career high

General			Interceptions			
Year	Team	GP	Int	Yds	TD	Lng
1960	STL	11	2	4	0	4
1961	STL	11	3	36	0	25
1962	STL	**14**	2	59	1	57
1963	STL	**14**	4	67	0	36
1964	STL	**14**	3	44	1	42
1965	STL	10	6	153	1	**96**
1966	STL	**14**	**10**	**180**	**2**	91
1967	STL	**14**	4	75	0	44
1968	STL	**14**	4	14	0	8
1969	STL	**14**	2	15	0	15
1970	STL	13	5	72	0	22
1971	STL	**14**	4	46	0	23
1972	STL	12	3	35	0	24
Career		169	52	800	5	96

== Personal life and death ==
As a freshman at the University of Utah in 1956, Wilson married Dee Ann (Hanson) Wilson, who he originally met in high school. They had three children (Christie, Jed, and Larry Jr.), and later divorced. In 1980, Wilson married Nancy (Drew) Wilson, and they were married until the time of his death. Nancy Wilson was a pioneer among female sports broadcasters, working at KMOX-AM radio in St. Louis for 13 years.

Wilson's son Jed was born with spina bifida, and was paralyzed from the waist down. During his childhood, Jed had at least 15 surgeries on his spine and spent long periods at St. Louis Children's Hospital. Jed died in 1986 at the age of twenty-five. When announcing his retirement in 1972, Wilson related how Jed had inspired him as a human being. In a game against the New York Giants, Wilson became dejected and started feeling sorry for himself because of his and the team's complete lack of success that day. "Then I thought of Jed. I said to myself if I could be half the man that boy was, I'd get out there and try'".

Wilson died on September 17, 2020, in Scottsdale, Arizona.
