= Ernie McMillan =

American football player (1938–2024)

No. 73, 70
- Position: Offensive tackle

Personal information
- Born: February 21, 1938; Chicago Heights, Illinois, U.S.
- Died: November 25, 2024 (aged 86)
- Listed height: 6 ft 5 in (1.96 m)
- Listed weight: 275 lb (125 kg)

Career information
- High school: DuSable (Chicago, Illinois)
- College: Illinois
- NFL draft: 1961: 13th round, 176th overall pick
- AFL draft: 1961: 29th round, 226th overall pick

Career history

Playing
- St. Louis Cardinals (1961–1974); Green Bay Packers (1975)

Coaching
- Green Bay Packers (1977–1983) Offensive line coach; St. Louis Cardinals (1985) Offensive line coach; Sumner HS (MO) (1990–1991) Offensive line coach

Operations
- St. Louis Cardinals (1984–1986) Scout

Awards and highlights
- 2× Second-team All-Pro (1966, 1967); 4× Pro Bowl (1965, 1967, 1969, 1970)

Career NFL statistics
- Games played: 190
- Games started: 184
- Fumble recoveries: 7
- Stats at Pro Football Reference

Ernest Charles McMillan (February 21, 1938 – November 25, 2024) was an American professional football player who was an offensive tackle for 15 seasons in the National Football League (NFL) for the St. Louis Cardinals and the Green Bay Packers. He was selected to play in the Pro Bowl four times. He played college football for the Illinois Fighting Illini.

== Early life ==
McMillan was born on February 21, 1938, in Chicago Heights or Evanston, Illinois. His family's surname was McMillon but it was recorded inadvertently with an "a" on his birth certificate and never corrected.

He grew up in Chicago and attended DuSable High School, where he excelled in both football and basketball. The 1953–1954 basketball team has been called one of the finest ever in the Chicago Public League, pioneering basketball styles, establishing the place of Chicago in Illinois basketball, and breaking racial barriers. His brother Shellie McMillon, who went on to play in the NBA, was also on that DuSable team. In 2003, the team was inducted into the NCAA Hall of Champions.

In 1957, McMillan was recruited by Ray Elliot to play football for the University of Illinois, where he played three years on the football team. In college he was a 6 ft 6 in (1.98 m) tight end, weighing 236 pounds (107 kb). He also played on defense. His teammates included future NFL players Bill Brown and Ed O'Bradovich.

== Professional football career ==
McMillan was selected in the 13th round of the 1961 NFL draft by the St. Louis Cardinals. When he reported to training camp, he had bulked up to 283 pounds; losing 20 pounds in camp. The Cardinals converted him to the offensive tackle position at right tackle, and he started six games his rookie season. He became a full-time starter at offensive tackle in his second season, and would go on to start 162 straight games for the Cardinals, until suffering a knee injury during a 1973 game. Overcoming inexperience, he became one of the NFL's best pass blockers. McMillan did not miss a game due to injury in his first 12 years with the Cardinals. In 1974, he agreed to switch to left tackle to accommodate future hall of famer Dan Dierdorf playing right tackle. His 162 consecutive starts are a team record for a position player (as of 2024).

He played in four Pro Bowls (1965, 1967, 1969–1970), and was twice selected second-team All Pro by the Associated Press (1966-67). United Press International selected him second-team All Pro in 1966 and 1968 and first team All-Conference in 1970 and 1971. The Newspaper Enterprise Association selected him first-team All Pro in 1967, and second-team in 1965, 1968, and 1970. His teammates named him the Cardinals Most Valuable Player in 1972, as did the Old Pros Club. He received the Chuck Drulis Award in 1973.

In 1967, three other offensive linemen from the Cardinals, Bob DeMarco (center), Irv Goode (left guard), and Ken Gray (right guard), along with Cardinals Hall of Fame tight end Jackie Smith, were all selected to the Pro Bowl.

After suffering a nerve injury in 1974, McMillan was waived before the start of the 1975 season. He played his final season with the Green Bay Packers in 1975, starting 11 games.

== Coaching career ==
McMillan was head coach Bart Starr's offensive line coach for Green Bay from 1977–1983. From 1983 to 1986 he served as a scout and offensive line coach for the Cardinals, under head coach Jim Hanifan, who had earlier been McMillan's offensive line coach in St. Louis. In 1990–1991, he was an assistant coach at Sumner High School, winning state championships during those years.

== Personal life and death ==
Early in their careers, McMillan and DeMarco served in the military together, and soon after became roommates with the Cardinals, a rare interracial pairing at the time. McMillan was the father of former Pro Bowl safety Erik McMillan, and uncle of Howard Richards, a former first-round pick of the Dallas Cowboys in 1981. Although their surnames have different spellings, Ernie's older brother Shellie McMillon played college basketball for the Bradley Braves and also played in the National Basketball Association (NBA). They both attended DuSable High School in Chicago. He was President of Proud magazine, focusing on the meaningful growth and presence of African American role and culture in St. Louis.

McMillan died on November 25, 2024, at the age of 86.

== Honors ==
McMillan was inducted into the Missouri Sports Hall of Fame in 2014. He was inducted into the St. Louis Sports Hall of Fame in 2018.
