= Ken Gray (American football) =

American football player and coach (1936–2017)

No. 64, 62
- Position: Guard

Personal information
- Born: March 10, 1936; San Saba, Texas, U.S.
- Died: November 25, 2017 (aged 81); Llano, Texas, U.S.
- Listed height: 6 ft 2 in (1.88 m)
- Listed weight: 245 lb (111 kg)

Career information
- High school: Llano
- College: Howard Payne (1955–1957)
- NFL draft: 1958: 6th round, 62nd overall pick

Career history

Playing
- Green Bay Packers (1958)*; Chicago / St. Louis Cardinals (1958–1969); Houston Oilers (1970)
- * Offseason or practice squad member only

Coaching
- Llano (1973–1975) Head coach; Denver Broncos (1977–1978) Offensive line coach

Awards and highlights
- 2× First-team All-Pro (1964, 1969); 5× Second-team All-Pro (1963, 1965–1968); 6× Pro Bowl (1961, 1963, 1964, 1966–1968)

Career NFL statistics
- Games played: 162
- Games started: 144
- Fumble recoveries: 8
- Stats at Pro Football Reference

Kenneth Don Gray (March 10, 1936 – November 25, 2017) was an American professional football player who was a guard for 13 seasons in the National Football League (NFL) with the Chicago / St. Louis Cardinals and the Houston Oilers; playing his rookie season as a defensive end as well as a guard. Gray was named first- or second-team All-Pro or All-Conference from 1963 to 1969 and was selected to play in six Pro Bowls. At the time he retired after the 1970 NFL season, Gray was the last NFL player to have played for the Chicago Cardinals. He played college football at tackle for the Howard Payne Yellow Jackets, where he was named a Little All-American as a senior in 1957.

== Early life ==
Gray was born on March 10, 1936, in San Saba, Texas to Lewis and Estelle Gray. Lewis was a cattle rancher, and worked as a heavy equipment operator during World War II; and Gray grew up on a cattle ranch, riding horses and doing tasks associated with raising cattle. Gray first attended Cherokee High School for two years, a rural school near Llano, Texas. There were only 35 students at Cherokee High (19 of them boys). Gray transferred to Llano High School for two years, graduating in 1954. He participated on Llano High School's football and basketball teams as a senior (not having been allowed to play as a junior after transferring). He played running back (fullback) and defensive tackle in high school, and was twice named all-district in football. He was also named all-district in basketball his senior year. Gray married Shirley Barber when he was 16. Llano held a "Ken Gray Day" on June 1, 1967.

== College career ==
Gray received an athletic scholarship to Howard Payne University (HPU) in Brownwood, Texas; which he attended from 1954 to 1957. He had married Vonceil (Shirley) Barber and was already a father before attending HPU. The school accommodated his need for a job and a family home, as well as schooling. Gray lettered four years at Howard Payne, where he played tackle, and was selected All-Lone Star Conference and a Little All-American. He graduated in 1958 with a degree in history and education. Gray believed HPU helped to shape his character and prepare him for any difficulties he faced in the NFL. He was also on the track team in college. After being selected in the 1958 NFL draft, Gray said "'I could never have made it without Shirley . . . She's been the breadwinner through my four years of college, and I'm ready to earn our living now'".

== Professional career ==
The Green Bay Packers selected him in the sixth round of the 1958 NFL draft, 62nd overall. He was the final player cut by Packer coach Scooter McLean in training camp prior to the regular NFL season that year, with the Packers keeping their number four draft pick, future Hall of Fame guard Jerry Kramer. At the time, an NFL team roster included 32 players. Other NFL teams contacted Gray to try out and he settled on the Chicago Cardinals because he would be driving through Illinois from Green Bay to Texas. His first NFL contract, in 1958, paid him $6,000.

Gray signed with the Cardinals before the third game of the 1958 NFL season, with an expectation he could be playing at guard, defensive end, or tackle. He started the sixth game of the 1958 season at right defensive end for the Cardinals, and started games at both defensive end and guard that season. The Cardinals moved Gray to starting right guard before the 1959 season; and he started all 12 games at right guard that season.

The Cardinals moved to St. Louis before the 1960 season. On October 2, 1960, during the Cardinals first home game that season, Gray suffered a dislocated shoulder and was placed on the disabled list. He returned four weeks later and reinjured the shoulder, only playing sporadically that season; starting three games and missing four. He started 13 games at right guard in 1961, and was selected to play in the Pro Bowl for the first time. Gray started all 14 games in 1962; his first season playing between Bob DeMarco at center and Ernie McMillan at right tackle. He would play the majority of games with the Cardinals between DeMarco and McMillan for the remainder of his career in St. Louis (1963 to 1969). The Gray, DeMarco, McMillan Cardinals' offensive line also included Irv Goode (1962 to 1969) and Bob Reynolds (1964 to 1969).

From 1963 to 1969, Gray's Cardinals teammates chose his as captain. In 1963, the Cardinals had a 9–5 record and were fourth in the NFL in total yards and points scored. In 1964, the Cardinals were 9–3–2, and were second in total yards and third in points scored. In 1967, Gray, DeMarco, Goode, McMillan, and Hall of Fame tight end Jackie Smith were all selected to the Pro Bowl. The Cardinals were fourth in the NFL in total yards that season.

Gray started all 14 regular season games as the Cardinals' right guard from 1963 through 1965. Gray injured his right knee in early October 1966, and started only 10 games that season. He had surgery in January 1967 to address cartilage damage in his knee. He started 13 games in 1967 but was bothered by his right knee during the season, and underwent surgery on his right knee cartilage again in June 1968. He started 14 games in 1968, but only 12 in 1969 after once more suffering a knee injury; and had knee surgery again in December 1969.

In August 1970, after being examined by the team doctor, the Cardinals waived Gray stating that Gray was likely unable to play another season because of all his knee surgeries; and he retired. However, after the Houston Oilers lost starting guard Tom Regner during the third game of the 1970 season, Gray came out of retirement to join the Oilers; and started in 10 of the Oilers' final 11 games that season. Gray underwent cartilage surgery on his left knee shortly after the season ended. He retired before the 1971 NFL season. At the time he retired, Gray was the last NFL player to have played for the Chicago Cardinals.

Gray earned All-Pro or All-Conference notice seven consecutive seasons (1963 to 1969) and played in six Pro Bowls (1961, 1963, 1964, 1966, 1967, and 1968).The Associated Press (AP) selected him as a first-team All-Pro in 1964, and second-team in 1963, 1965, and 1967. United Press International (UPI) selected him first-team All-Pro from 1963 to 1965, and second-team in 1966 and 1967. In December 1963, The Sporting News selected Gray as a first-team NFL All-Star, and was again named by The Sporting News as an NFL All-Star in 1964. It is also reported that from 1963 to 1969 The Sporting News selected him first-team All-Conference.

=== Lawsuit against the Cardinals ===
In January 1971, Gray filed a lawsuit against the Cardinals for alleged breach of contract in not paying him money he claimed was owed through May 1971; which Gray claimed was still due him if he was unable to play because of a football related injury. Gray also alleged the team failed to treat a knee injury properly in 1969, and that the Cardinals gave him illegal and dangerous drugs without consent and for no medical purpose but "'for the purpose of stimulating and exciting his mind so that he would perform more violently as a professional football player'", resulting in various physical harms. Gray claimed $45,000 in lost wages from the breach of contract, and larger amounts for actual and punitive damages. The Cardinals opposed Gray's claims against the team. After being awarded $28,450 on the breach of contract claim by a trial court in 1973, which the Cardinals had appealed, Gray and the Cardinals settled the matter.

== Coaching career ==
After retiring as a player, he served for three years (1973 to 1975) as head coach at his high school alma mater, Llano High School, where he coached his son, who was an All-State player. The team was 23–10–1 during those three seasons. In 1977 and 1978 he was offensive line coach for the Denver Broncos, under coach Red Miller who had been Gray's offensive line coach in St. Louis. The Broncos reached Super Bowl XII, where they lost against the Dallas Cowboys. He stopped coaching for the Broncos after 1978 to spend more time with his family, who he would seldom see while working 18-hour days as a coach. He coached high school football again from 1986 to 1988 with the Rockdale Tigers.

== Honors ==
In 1963 or 1964, Gray was inducted into the National Association of Intercollegiate Athletics (NAIA) Hall of Fame. In 1986, he was inducted into the Howard Payne University Sports Hall of Fame. In 2016, he was inducted into the Texas Sports Hall of Fame along with former University of Texas head football coach Fred Akers, former Dallas Cowboys offensive lineman Larry Allen and former Major League Baseball pitcher Andy Pettitte. He earned a spot on the St. Louis Cardinals All-Time Team. In 2018, the Professional Football Researchers Association named Gray to the PFRA Hall of Very Good Class of 2018.

== Personal life and death ==
Ken met his longtime wife, Vonceil (Shirley Jean) Barber, in high school and married soon after. They were married 65 years at the time of his death, and had four children, 11 grandchildren, 18 great-grandchildren, and two great-great-grandchildren. He made his home in Llano, Texas throughout his life, where he died on November 25, 2017, at the age of 81.
