= Bob DeMarco =

American football player (born 1938)

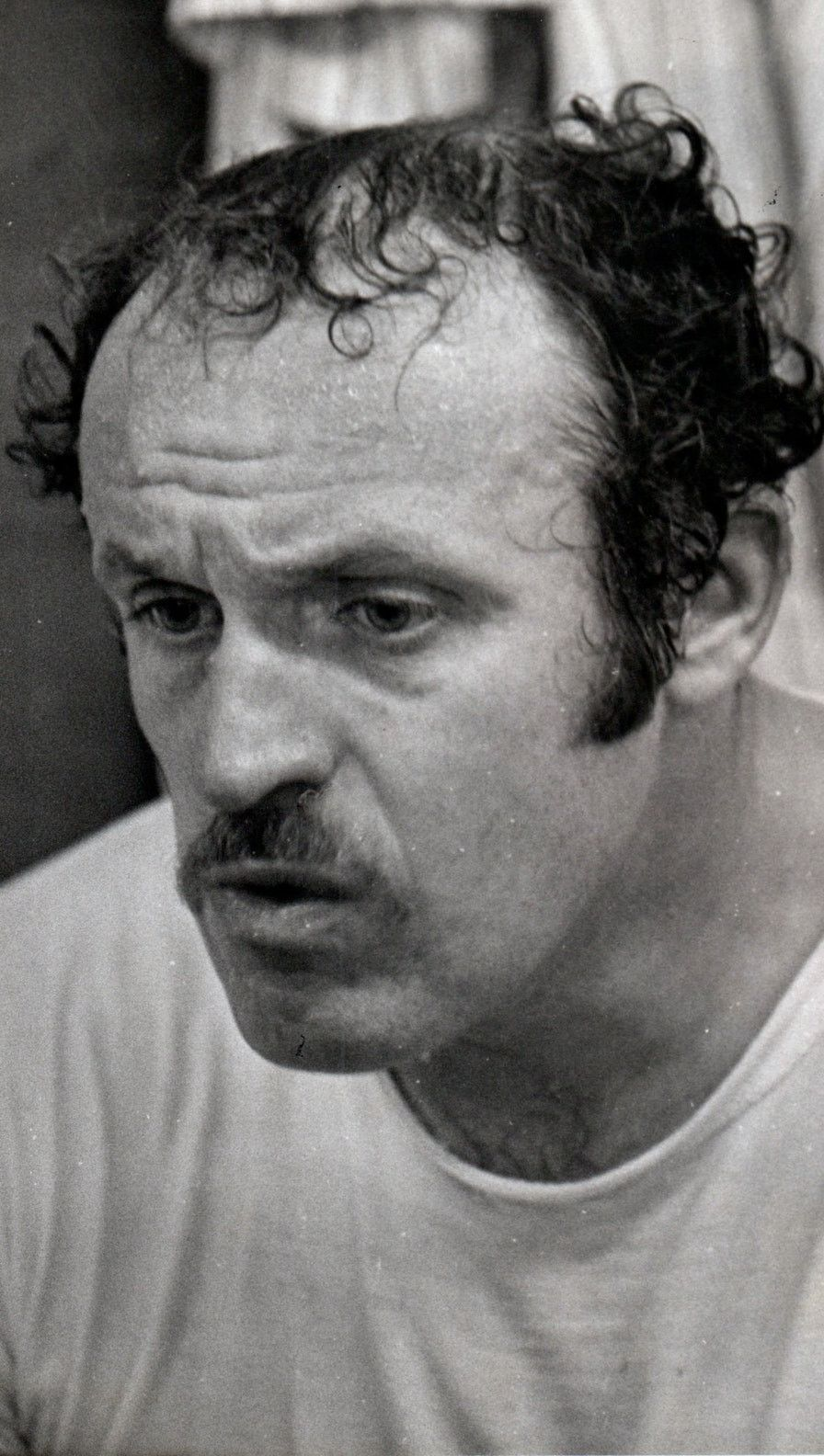
- DeMarco in 1972

No. 61, 55
- Position: Center

Personal information
- Born: September 16, 1938 (age 88); Jersey City, New Jersey, U.S.
- Listed height: 6 ft 2 in (1.88 m)
- Listed weight: 248 lb (112 kg)

Career information
- High school: St. Mary (Rutherford, New Jersey)
- College: Indiana (1957); Dayton (1959–1960)
- NFL draft: 1960: 14th round, 157th overall pick
- AFL draft: 1960

Career history
- St. Louis Cardinals (1961–1969); Pittsburgh Steelers (1970)*; Miami Dolphins (1970–1971); Cleveland Browns (1972–1974); Los Angeles Rams (1975)
- * Offseason or practice squad member only

Awards and highlights
- First-team All-Pro (1967); 2× Second-team All-Pro (1963, 1968); 3× Pro Bowl (1963, 1965, 1967); Third-team All-American (1960)

Career NFL statistics
- Games played: 185
- Games started: 163
- Fumble recoveries: 8
- Stats at Pro Football Reference

Robert Albert DeMarco (born September 16, 1938) is an American former professional football player who played 15 seasons in the National Football League (NFL) for the St. Louis Cardinals, Miami Dolphins, Cleveland Browns, and Los Angeles Rams; playing 14 of those seasons as a center. He was a three-time Pro Bowl selection with the Cardinals, and was named a first- or second-team All-Pro five times with the Cardinals. He was the starting center in Super Bowl VI for the Dolphins, and played an important part in getting the 1972 Cleveland Browns into the playoffs.

DeMarco played college football for the Indiana Hoosiers and Dayton Flyers. In 1960, Dayton awarded DeMarco the White Allen Trophy as the team's most valuable player; and he was a United Press International honorable mention All-American, a third-team American Football Coaches Association All-American, and a Kodak All-American. DeMarco played in the Blue-Gray Game and Senior Bowl after his senior season at Dayton. In 1975, he was inducted into Dayton's Athletics Hall of Fame.

DeMarco had been named his team's most valuable player at the high school, college, and professional football levels.

== Early life ==
DeMarco was born on September 16, 1938, in Jersey City, New Jersey to Albert and Louise DeMarco. Raised in Wood-Ridge, New Jersey, DeMarco graduated in 1956 from St. Mary High School in nearby Rutherford, New Jersey, where he played both offense and defense on the school’s football team. He was a reserve center as a sophomore in 1953, and later in his St. Mary's career became a starting center and tackle. In DeMarco's sophomore year (1953), the undefeated Gaels won the state championship. In an early October 1953 game, he recovered a fumble on special teams, and had an interception on defense. The 1953 team was inducted into the St. Mary High School Athletic Hall of Fame in 1997.

The Gaels also won the North Jersey Catholic Group B championship in 1954. DeMarco was the starting center in the championship game. In early September 1955, the 210 lb (95.3 kg) DeMarco had transferred to the New York Military Academy (known as a "football factory" and "farm school" for the United States Military Academy). The transfer lasted less than two weeks, and he returned to St. Mary later that same September. He started at tackle that season. DeMarco was co-captain of St. Mary's 1955 team. He was named to All-State and All-Catholic teams.

DeMarco also played basketball for St. Mary's team.

== College ==
DeMarco received a football scholarship to Indiana University, where he played one year of varsity football at tackle; leaving after his sophomore season (1957). Indiana football coach Phil Dickens was suspended before the 1957 season and was replaced by interim coach Bob Hicks. The Hoosiers had a series of lopsided losses to begin the season and a number of players felt a lack of support from the University's community, threatening to leave the team. DeMarco left campus for one day at that point in time, but after a heart-to-heart talk with Hicks, stayed on with the team. He was named Big Ten Lineman of the Week for his performance against Villanova that season; recovering a fumble in that game that led to a touchdown in Indiana's only victory of the season. The Hoosiers finished the season with a 1–8 record.

DeMarco transferred to the University of Dayton in 1958; but could not play football for one year at Dayton under the then existing transfer rules. DeMarco went on to play two years at Dayton, and was team captain his senior year (1960). He played on both offense and defense; playing at right tackle on offense. He also played tackle on defense. In a late October 1960 game against the Wichita State Shockers, while being double-teamed during the game, DeMarco had 18 solo tackles and two assisted tackles. He was also credited with 15 tackles in a game against Cincinnati.

As a senior, Dayton awarded DeMarco the White Allen Trophy as the team's most valuable player. He received honorable mention for United Press International's 1960 All-America team. The American Football Coaches Association named him a third-team All-American at tackle. DeMarco was selected to the Kodak All-America team in 1960; and played in the December 31, 1960 Blue-Gray Game and January 7, 1961 Senior Bowl.

DeMarco was reported to be 6 ft 3 in (1.91 m) 235 lb (106.6 kg) as a senior, and 6 ft 3 in 245 lb (111.1 kg) as a junior. He graduated from Dayton in 1961 with a Bachelor of Science degree in business management and economics.

== Professional career ==
DeMarco was selected by the Chicago Cardinals in the 14th round of 1960 NFL draft, 157th overall, as a future selection (who would not come into the league until the following season). He was also selected by the Los Angeles Chargers in the 1960 American Football League draft. The Cardinals moved to St. Louis before the 1960 NFL season. DeMarco signed a contract to play for the Cardinals on December 7, 1960.

DeMarco played in the NFL from 1961 to 1969 for the St. Louis Cardinals, from 1970 to 1971 for the Miami Dolphins, from 1972 to 1974 for the Cleveland Browns and in 1975 for the Los Angeles Rams. He played guard as a rookie, but center for the next 14 years after that. During the 1960s he served as a player representative for the players union.

=== St. Louis Cardinals ===
DeMarco was a reserve guard in 1961 as a rookie, appearing in only four or six games; having been called up for military duty with the United States Army. Fellow Cardinals' rookie Ernie McMillan also appeared in only six games in 1961, having similarly being called to serve in the United States Army. McMillan and DeMarco were stationed together in the American South during the era of civil rights protests and marches. They would intentionally drive together through small towns with DeMarco as the driver and McMillan sitting in the back seat of a car smoking a big cigar, as if the white DeMarco was chauffeuring the black McMillan. After rejoining the Cardinals, they became roommates, a rare interracial pairing at the time. DeMarco and McMillan (right tackle) would play on the Cardinals' offensive line together from 1962 to 1969.

DeMarco was back with the Cardinals for the team's 1962 training camp. He was moved to center that season, and started all 14 games for the Cardinals. DeMarco had only played center on special teams in college, and not on the offensive line. He started learning the center position for the Cardinals during training camp, beginning on July 27, 1962; and within 12 days he was considered capable of playing center or guard, while given the starting center assignment in the Cardinals' first preseason game. By the end of August 1962, the Cardinals had released veteran center Don Gillis and made DeMarco the Cardinals' starting center. The 1962 offensive line included DeMarco and McMillan, as well as Ken Gray at right guard and Irv Goode at left tackle. The four would play on the Cardinals' offensive line together from 1962 through the 1969 season.

DeMarco started all 14 games at center again in 1963, and was selected to play in the Pro Bowl for the first time. He was named second-team All-Pro by the Associated Press (AP) and Newspaper Enterprise Association (NEA). In 1963, the Cardinals had a 9–5 record and were fourth in the NFL in total yards and points scored.

In 1964, DeMarco started all 12 games in which he appeared. He suffered a badly sprained ankle in an early November victory over the Pittsburgh Steelers, and missed two games that season. He was named first-team All-Pro by the NEA and first-team All-Conference by The Sporting News. Bob Reynolds became the team's starting left tackle that season; with Goode moving to left guard. In 1964, the Cardinals were 9–3–2, and were second in the NFL in total yards and third in points scored.

The starting offensive line of DeMarco, Goode, Gray, McMillan, and Reynolds would remain together with the Cardinals through the 1969 season. DeMarco considered this offensive line one of the greatest in NFL history. When later discussing the quality and cohesiveness of that Cardinals' offensive line, DeMarco observed "'An offensive line has to think as a unit, not individually . . . It's not just one guy, or two guys, or three guys . . . When we go after somebody, it's five guys against their defensive line'".

DeMarco started all 14 games again in 1965. He was selected to play in the Pro Bowl for the second time, and was named second-team All-Pro by United Press International, and first-team All-Conference by The Sporting News. Early in the following season (1966), New York Giants' scout Joe Walton said "'DeMarco is one of the finest centers in the league, and plugs up the middle as good as anyone I've seen...'" DeMarco later suffered a torn right knee ligament in the season's ninth game against the New York Giants that ended his 1966 season. Charley Winner became the Cardinals head coach in 1966; with whom DeMarco would later have a falling out leading to DeMarco's release by the Cardinals. The Cardinals had an 8–5–1 record in 1966.

DeMarco returned in 1967, started all 14 games, and was named first-team All-Pro for the only time in his career by the Associated Press. He was selected to play in the Pro Bowl for a third time; and was named second-team All-Pro by the NEA and UPI and first-team All-Conference by The Sporting News. In 1967, DeMarco was awarded a game ball after playing with a broken wrist and torn rib cartilage. Goode, Gray, and McMillan, as well as Cardinals' Hall of Fame tight end Jackie Smith, were selected to the Pro Bowl after the 1967 season. The Cardinals were fourth in the NFL in total yards that season; finishing the season with a 6–7–1 record.

DeMarco started all 14 games in 1968, was named second-team All-Pro by the AP, NEA and UPI; and first-team All-Conference by The Sporting News. The team was 9–4–1. In 1969, DeMarco started all 12 games in which he appeared, missing two games because of injuries. He was named first-team All-Conference by The Sporting News. The Cardinals finished the season 4–9–1.

It was reported that DeMarco requested a trade because of a conflict that developed between him and head coach Charley Winner during the 1969 season, as the team faltered. The dispute was over the manner in which Winner was handling the quarterback competition between Jim Hart and Charley Johnson, DeMarco believing this created doubts in each quarterback that were undermining their performances. The Cardinals waived DeMarco in July 1970. DeMarco said he was shocked that the Cardinals simply released him; and reportedly believed that the team had refused trade opportunities, to his detriment. He later said "'At St. Louis, I was at the top, considered one of the best in the business . . . then because I let my feelings be known to the head coach . . . all of the sudden I'm discarded'".

=== Pittsburgh Steelers ===
DeMarco was claimed by the Pittsburgh Steelers after his release by the Cardinals; reportedly the only team that had shown any interest in him; though DeMarco believed there was something untoward in the Steelers' claiming him off of waivers, in a manner that he believed could have thwarted his ongoing success in the NFL. DeMarco was baffled by the Steelers claiming him because they already had a good center in Ray Mansfield. The Steelers planned to use DeMarco as a backup center at most, but DeMarco believed he was still a starting caliber NFL center, and during the Steelers' 1970 training camp DeMarco requested a trade. The Steelers traded DeMarco to the Miami Dolphins before the 1970 season for an eighth round draft pick, the Dolphins needing a replacement for the injured Tom Goode. After being traded to the Dolphins, DeMarco played another six years in the NFL, starting 61 regular season games and four playoff games.

=== Miami Dolphins ===
DeMarco started the Dolphins first 11 games at center in 1970. He suffered a leg injury in the 11th game of the season, against the Atlanta Falcons, and did not start again that season. DeMarco started every game at center for the Dolphins 1971 team that went to Super Bowl VI, including three playoffs games. DeMarco was the Dolphins' oldest player that season, and head coach Don Shula said DeMarco was the player who kept the offensive line together. United Press International named DeMarco second-team All-Conference in 1971.

DeMarco played in the December 25, 1971 AFC divisional round playoff game between the Dolphins and Kansas City Chiefs, which is the longest NFL game in history; lasting 82 minutes and 40 seconds of playing time (though the actual time from the beginning to end of the game was three hours and 18 minutes). In the huddle before the winning field goal was kicked, DeMarco reportedly told Miami placekicker Garo Yepremian “‘You better make this you son of a bitch. I’m getting tired’”. DeMarco started in the Dolphins' AFC championship game victory over the Baltimore Colts, and Super Bowl VI loss to the Dallas Cowboys. After starting in the Super Bowl two years after his release by the Cardinals, DeMarco said "'Getting to the Super Bowl gave me the personal satisfaction of proving that I can still do the job for one of the top teams in the NFL. I know I could still be contributing at St. Louis'".

=== Cleveland Browns and Los Angeles Rams ===
In 1972, when future Hall of Fame coach Don Shula made Jim Langer the starting center during the preseason, at the suggestion of offensive line coach Monte Clark, DeMarco left training camp for a time as he did not believe he would receive a fair chance to compete for the starting job. The Dolphins traded Demarco to the Buffalo Bills but he refused to report, and retired. At that point in his career, DeMarco did not want to join a young and rebuilding club. After missing the first two games of the 1972 season, he agreed to be traded to the Cleveland Browns in exchange for a draft pick. The Browns had been 9–5 in 1971, and reached the playoffs.

DeMarco played in Cleveland for three years. He started nine games for the Browns in 1972, 13 games in 1973, and all 14 games in 1974 (at 36 years old). DeMarco's first start as the Brown's center was in Game 6 of the 1972 season, with the team at 2–3. He became the anchor of the Browns' 1972 offensive line, the team winning eight of the nine games he started to finish the season. The Browns ended the 1972 season 10–4 and reached the playoffs. DeMarco started in the 1972 divisional round 20–14 loss to the eventual Super Bowl VII champion Dolphins. The Browns were 7–5–2 in 1973, with DeMarco being named the team's most valuable offensive player.

The Browns released DeMarco after the 1974 season. He signed as a free agent with the Los Angeles Rams for the 1975 season, his final year in the NFL. He was a reserve center on the offensive line; and knew he would be a reserve when joining the Rams. He played center on special teams, appearing in all 14 games that season. Rams' coach Chuck Knox wanted DeMarco to return the next season, but the 37-year-old DeMarco remembered the advice of Hall of Fame center Jim Ringo, that if your body did not recover from the previous week's game until the day before the next game, it was time to retire.

== Legacy and honors ==
DeMarco was named to three Pro Bowls (1963, 1965, 1967) and to one Associated Press (AP) first-team All-Pro team (1967) while playing for the Cardinals. The AP recognized him as second-team All-Pro in 1963 and 1968, and the Newspaper Enterprise Association named him first-team All-Pro in 1964 and second-team All-Pro in 1963, 1967, and 1968. United Press International named him second-team All-Pro in 1965, 1967, and 1968, and second-team All-Conference in 1971. The Sporting News named him first team All-Conference in 1964, 1965, 1967, 1968, and 1969.

In 1975, DeMarco was inducted into the University of Dayton's Athletics Hall of Fame. He was inducted into the St. Louis Sports Hall of Fame in 2018.

DeMarco was known for being outspoken during his career. From his perspective, this manifested in his speaking up to address and correct problems to benefit his team, not to undermine it.

== Personal life ==
During his career DeMarco was married and the father of four, making their home in the St. Louis area. He worked as a stockbroker in St. Louis during the offseason. After retiring, DeMarco returned to St. Louis, where he worked in electronics and finance, and was a long-time salesman for a chemical company.
