= Bobby Boyd =

American football player (1937–2017)

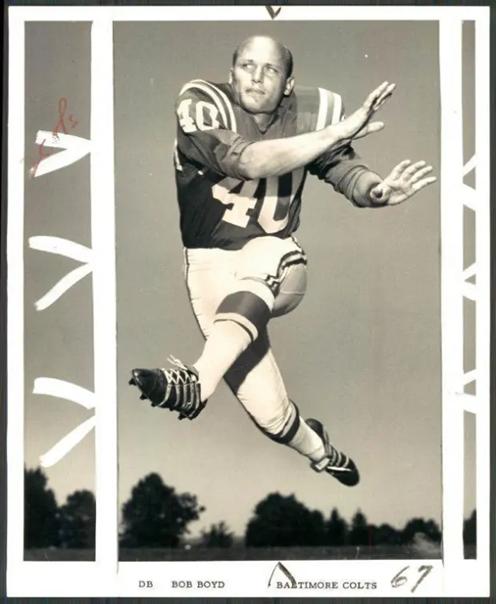
- Boyd in promotional photo

No. 40
- Position: Cornerback

Personal information
- Born: December 3, 1937; Dallas, Texas, U.S.
- Died: August 28, 2017 (aged 79); Garland, Texas, U.S.
- Listed height: 5 ft 11 in (1.80 m)
- Listed weight: 195 lb (88 kg)

Career information
- High school: Garland (TX)
- College: Oklahoma (1957–1959)
- NFL draft: 1960: 10th round, 119th overall pick
- AFL draft: 1960: 2nd round

Career history

Playing
- Baltimore Colts (1960–1968)

Coaching
- Baltimore Colts (1969–1972) Defensive backs coach; Baltimore Colts (1981) Defensive assistant

Awards and highlights
- As a player: NFL champion (1968); 3x First-Team All-Pro (1964, 1965, 1968); 2× Second-Team All-Pro (1966, 1967); 2× Pro Bowl (1964, 1968); NFL interceptions leader (1965); NFL 1960s All-Decade Team; First-team All-Big Eight (1959); As a coach: Super Bowl champion (V)

Career NFL statistics
- Interceptions: 57
- Interception yards: 994
- Touchdowns: 5
- Stats at Pro Football Reference

Robert Dean Boyd (December 3, 1937 – August 28, 2017) was an American professional football player in the National Football League (NFL). Boyd spent his entire nine-year career as a cornerback for the Baltimore Colts from 1960 to 1968. He played college football for the Oklahoma Sooners.

When Boyd retired, he was one of eight players with 50 or more interceptions in NFL history, and was then-ranked third all-time in NFL career interceptions. Boyd is one of only three players with 50 or more interceptions who played less than ten years in the NFL. As of 2026, Boyd is tied with four other players at 13th all-time in NFL career interceptions.

Boyd was one of three cornerbacks selected for the NFL 1960s All-Decade Team. Despite having more career interceptions than all other cornerbacks on the team, Boyd is the only member from that group not in the Pro Football Hall of Fame.

== Early life ==
Bobby Boyd was born on December 3, 1937, in Dallas, Texas. He was raised in nearby Garland, Texas, where he played basketball, baseball, and football at Garland High School. Boyd earned Texas All-State football honors during his junior and senior years. As a senior halfback, Boyd recorded 220 carries for 1,719 yards and 26 touchdowns while also making 10 interceptions as a defensive back.

Following his senior season, Boyd was selected to play in the 1956 Oil Bowl high school all-star game. Boyd's Texas all-star team soundly defeated the Oklahoma squad, 37–0.

Boyd originally committed to play college football at SMU before switching his commitment to the University of Oklahoma.

== College career ==
At Oklahoma, Boyd played under legendary head coach Bud Wilkinson. Boyd began his career at Oklahoma at halfback where he played as a sophomore.

Prior to the 1958 season, Boyd's junior year, Wilkerson switched Boyd to quarterback on offense, while he continued to play as a defensive back and punt returner. In 1958, he led the Sooners to a Big Seven Championship. That year, he led the Big Seven in passing touchdowns with five and overall touchdowns with 11 total (six rushing, five passing). Oklahoma finished the season at 10–1, suffering their first loss in 47 games - a streak that began in 1953. They ended the 1958 season at #5 in the AP poll, and defeated Syracuse in the Orange Bowl, 21–6.

In 1959, Oklahoma repeated as Big Seven Conference champions and Boyd earned All-Big Seven Conference honors. At quarterback, Boyd's passing was limited to 19 completions for 256 yards. As a runner, he had 144 attempts for 508 yards. On defense, Boyd recorded three interceptions to lead the Big Seven Conference. The Sooners went 7–3, ending the season at #15 in the AP poll.

== Professional career ==
Boyd was drafted by the Baltimore Colts in the 10th round, 119th overall selection, of the 1960 NFL draft. Boyd was also taken by the Los Angeles Chargers in the inaugural 1960 AFL draft. Boyd chose to play with Baltimore in the NFL. As a professional, Boyd played primarily on defense as a cornerback and also returned punts.

=== Early career ===
In Boyd's rookie season, he played in 11 games, finishing with seven interceptions and 132 yards. His seven interceptions led the Colts for the year and he finished second in the NFL in interception return yards. Although Baltimore were the defending 1959 NFL Champions, the 1960 Colts finished the season at 6-6 and missed the playoffs.

In 1961, Boyd started all 14 games and began returning punts. He finished the season with two interceptions on defense and returned 18 punts for 173 yards (with 9.6 yards per return). Boyd finished fourth in the NFL in punt returns and third in punt return yards. The Colts improved to 8–6 on the year, but missed the playoffs for the second consecutive season.

In 1962, Boyd's third season, he again started all 14 games despite suffering injuries to his ribs and knee. He equaled his rookie season tally with seven interceptions for 163 yards, leading the Colts in both categories. Boyd also contributed with four fumble recoveries, one half sack, and three punt returns for 23 yards. Boyd recorded his first NFL rushing attempt in week 10 on a 15-yard fake field goal run against the Green Bay Packers. Boyd nearly scored before being knocked out of bounds at the one-yard line. The Colts again finished the season as a middling team, with a 7–7 record.

Boyd suffered a separated shoulder during a 1963 pre-season game, which sidelined him for the first two weeks of the 1963 regular season. He started in the 12 remaining games of the season, totaling three interceptions for 17 yards and recovering two fumbles for 34 yards and one touchdown. Boyd's first NFL touchdown came on a takeaway from Green Bay's Earl Gros. Boyd took the ball from Gros and returned it 34 yards for a touchdown. The Colts finished the season at 8-6 under first-year head coach Don Shula.

=== All-Pro years ===
Starting with the 1964 season, Boyd amassed five straight NFL All-Pro selections. In 1964, Boyd had a career high nine interceptions for 185 yards, and added one fumble recovery. His best performance of the season came against the San Francisco 49ers in week 12, where he recorded two interceptions for 28 yards in the Colts' 14–3 victory. Boyd finished third in the NFL in total interceptions, but led the league in interception return yards. Boyd was named to the 1964 All-Pro First Team and the 1964 Pro Bowl. The Colts finished first in the NFL West Division at 12–2 and earned a place in the 1964 NFL Championship against the Cleveland Browns, which the Colts lost 27–0.

In 1965, Boyd matched his career high with nine interceptions for 78 yards with one touchdown and had two fumble recoveries. Boyd led the NFL in interceptions for the 1965 season. Boyd was named the NFL Defensive Player of the Week in week three, where he recorded two interceptions and returned one for a touchdown to secure a 27–24 victory over the San Francisco 49ers. Boyd earned his second consecutive First-team All-Pro selection. Baltimore went 10–3–1, and won the NFL West Division. In the Divisional Round playoff game against the Green Bay Packers, Boyd had one interception for six yards in a controversial 10–13 overtime loss.

In 1966, Boyd recorded six interceptions for 114 yards and one touchdown while also having one fumble recovery. He was seventh in the NFL in interceptions and fourth in interception return yards for the season. In week three, Boyd intercepted Chicago Bears quarterback Rudy Bukich and returned the ball for a 37-yard touchdown. He was named to the First-team All-Pro by Pro Football Writer and UPI and the Second-team All-Pro by the New York Daily News and the Associated Press. Baltimore finished 9–5, but missed the playoffs.

Boyd continued to be productive in the 1967 season. He had six interceptions for 145 yards and one touchdown and one fumble recovery, tying rookie Rick Volk as the Colts' leader in interceptions. Boyd started the season strong, and in week one recorded two interceptions while returning one for a 30-yard touchdown against quarterback Randy Johnson and the Atlanta Falcons. Boyd was named First Team All-Conference by the Sporting News and to the Second-Team All-Pro. Although the Colts finished first in the Coastal Division with an 11–1–2 record, they did not participate in the playoffs due to a point-differential tiebreaker with the Los Angeles Rams. The teams had tied in mid-October in Baltimore and the Colts entered the last game undefeated, but lost 34–10 to the Rams in Los Angeles.

In what became his final season as a player, Boyd again turned in an All-Pro performance in 1968. He led the Colts with eight interceptions for 160 yards and one touchdown and added one fumble recovery. Boyd and linebacker Mike Curtis led the Colts defense as the NFL's best in scoring and takeaways. In week three, Boyd recorded a 25-yard interception return for a touchdown in a victory over the Pittsburgh Steelers. In week 10 against the St. Louis Cardinals, Boyd had two interceptions of quarterback Jim Hart. The Colts finished the regular season at 13-1 and won the NFL Coastal Division.

In the 1968 NFL playoffs, Boyd appeared in all three games. In the Western Conference Championship game against the Minnesota Vikings, Boyd intercepted a throw from quarterback Joe Kapp, returning it for 20 yards. The Colts won the 1968 NFL Championship Game, defeating the Cleveland Browns 34–0. In Super Bowl III, Boyd recorded two tackles, but the Colts lost 16–7 in an upset to the New York Jets. Boyd was named a 1968 First-team All-Pro and earned a place in the 1968 Pro Bowl.

Following the 1968 season, Boyd retired from playing to coach for the Colts.

=== Legacy ===
Boyd finished his playing career with 57 interceptions for 994 yards and four touchdowns. As of 2024, he is the Colts all-time leader in career interceptions and interception return yards. Boyd is tied with Mel Blount, Eugene Robinson, Johnny Robinson, and Everson Walls for 13th all-time in NFL career interceptions. In the entire decade of the 1960s, nobody had more interceptions than Boyd. Teammate Tom Matte described Boyd as "a very smart player who knew the receivers’ moves before they even made them. The little son of a gun could figure it out. He had a great vision of the field. It was like having a Raymond Berry on defense.” A noted student of game films, Boyd was noted for his knowledge of the nuances of the quarterbacks to face; when asked how he did a certain interception after the game, he simply shrugged and told him that he just took advantage of them missing which pattern the quarterback was doing.

Boyd was named to the National Football League 1960s All-Decade Team. In 2017, the Professional Football Researchers Association named Boyd to the PFRA Hall of Very Good Class of 2017.

== NFL career statistics ==
Legend
	Led the league
**Bold**	Career high

=== Regular season ===
Year	Team	Games		Interceptions				Fumbles		
Year	Team	GP	GS	Int	Yds	Lng	TD	FR	Yds	TD
1960	BAL	11	11	7	132	**74**	0	0	0	0
1961	BAL	**14**	**14**	2	0	0	0	0	0	0
1962	BAL	**14**	**14**	7	163	38	0	**4**	16	0
1963	BAL	12	12	3	17	9	0	2	**34**	**1**
1964	BAL	**14**	12	**9**	**185**	47	0	1	0	0
1965	BAL	**14**	**14**	**9**	78	24	**1**	2	17	0
1966	BAL	**14**	**14**	6	114	37	**1**	1	0	0
1967	BAL	**14**	11	6	145	41	**1**	1	0	0
1968	BAL	**14**	13	8	160	49	**1**	1	0	0
Career		121	115	57	994	74	4	12	67	1

== Coaching career ==
Boyd retired as a player after the 1968 season to join the Baltimore Colts coaching staff. Head coach Don McCafferty recruited Boyd to replace defensive backs coach Chuck Noll, who left to become the head coach of the Pittsburgh Steelers. Boyd was a member of the Colts coaching staff during their 1970 Super Bowl V winning season. Anchored by safeties Rick Volk and Jerry Logan, the Colts defense helped the team to an 11–2–1 record. After handily beating the Cincinnati Bengals and Oakland Raiders in the playoffs, the Colts managed to sneak out a victory in Super Bowl V, beating the Dallas Cowboys 16–13 on a last second field goal by Jim O'Brien. Boyd retired from coaching following the 1972 season.

In October 1981, Boyd was asked by Colts head coach Mike McCormack to return to the team as a defensive assistant. The Colts started the season at 1–6 and had given up 229 points. McCormack looked to Boyd to turn around the faltering defense. Boyd remained on staff for the rest of the 1981 season. The Colts finished the season at 2–14, leading to McCormack's firing.

== Post-football career ==
Boyd was a close friend of Colts quarterback Johnny Unitas, and the pair partnered together in several Baltimore area business ventures. In 1968, they opened The Golden Arm Restaurant in Towson, Maryland. Unitas and Boyd sold their interest in the restaurant in 1988, and it remained open until 1995. The pair were also involved in the air freight business before briefly opening another Towson restaurant, Baby Doe's Mining Co., in 1981. Boyd opened Hooligan's, a bar he ran on his own, in 1975. He ran Hooligan's for eight years, before he retired to his hometown of Garland, Texas with his wife.

== Personal life ==
Boyd was married and had three children. During the NFL offseason, Boyd held various jobs as a sales representative in the Baltimore area.

Boyd died of bladder cancer on August 28, 2017, age 79, in Garland, Texas.
