= 1965 Baltimore Colts season =

13th season in franchise history; third place finish in NFL

- Owner: Carroll Rosenbloom
- General manager: Don "Red" Kellett
- Head coach: Don Shula
- Home stadium: Memorial Stadium

Results
- Record: 10–3–1
- Division place: T-1st NFL Western (playoff)
- Playoffs: Lost Western Conference Playoff (at Packers) 10–13; Won NFL Playoff Bowl (vs. Cowboys) 35–3

The 1965 Baltimore Colts season was the 13th season for the team in the National Football League. The Baltimore Colts finished the National Football League's 1965 season with a record of 10 wins, 3 losses, and 1 tie, which tied for first in the Western Conference with the Green Bay Packers. No tie-breaking system was in place, and a playoff game was required to determine the Western Conference champion, who would host the Eastern Conference champion Cleveland Browns for the NFL title.

The Colts were victims of the alleged Sports Illustrated cover jinx after linebacker Dennis Gaubatz was featured in late November. According to the article on the team's defense, the 9–1 Colts would soon clinch the Western title. But the team was beset with numerous obstacles from that point on, not the least of which were serious injuries to both of their quarterbacks, future Hall of Famer Johnny Unitas and back-up Gary Cuozzo.

After it was ruled that veteran free agent Ed Brown had been acquired too late for inclusion on the postseason roster, halfback Tom Matte (who had played quarterback at Ohio State for Woody Hayes) was pressed into service behind center. Yet the Colts were a remarkably resilient bunch, and if not for a blown call in the playoff game, they would have advanced to the league championship game, which they would have hosted at Memorial Stadium in Baltimore.

== Offseason ==
=== NFL draft ===
1965 Baltimore Colts draft
Round	Pick	Player	Position	College	Notes
1	14	Mike Curtis *	Linebacker	Duke	
2	28	Ralph Neely *	Tackle	Oklahoma	
3	36	Glenn Ressler	Guard	Penn State	
4	49	Marty Schottenheimer *	Linebacker	Pittsburgh	Signed with the AFL
Made roster * Made at least one Pro Bowl during career

=== Undrafted free agents ===
1965 undrafted free agents of note
Player	Position	College
Jim Murphy	Quarterback	Air Force
Ted Torok	Center	Virginia

== Personnel ==
=== Staff/coaches ===
1965 Baltimore Colts staff
Front office: Owner/president – Carroll Rosenbloom; Vice president/general manager – Red Kellett; Coaching staff: Head coach – Don Shula; Offensive coaches: Receivers/offensive ends – Dick Bielski; Offensive backs – Don McCafferty; Offensive line coach – John Sandusky	Defensive coaches: Defensive coordinator/defensive line - Bill Arnsparger; Defensive backfield – Charley Winner; Linebackers coach – Don Shula

=== Roster ===
1965 Baltimore Colts roster
Quarterbacks (QB): 14 Ed Brown P; Running backs (RB): 32 Mike Curtis; 45 Jerry Hill; 33 Tony Lorick; 41 Tom Matte QB; 24 Lenny Moore; Wide receivers (WR): 82 Raymond Berry; 25 Alex Hawkins; 28 Jimmy Orr; 87 Willie Richardson; 84 Neal Petties; Tight ends (TE): 88 John Mackey; 86 Butch Wilson	Offensive linemen (OL): 50 Buzz Nutter C; 77 Jim Parker G; 60 George Preas T; 62 Glenn Ressler G/C; 68 Alex Sandusky G; 71 Dan Sullivan T; 52 Dick Szymanski C; 72 Bob Vogel T; Defensive linemen (DL): 81 Ordell Braase DE; 85 Roy Hilton DE; 75 Lou Michaels DE/K; 76 Fred Miller DT; 74 Billy Ray Smith DT; 75 Guy Reese DT	Linebackers (LB): 35 Ted Davis OLB; 53 Dennis Gaubatz MLB; 67 Monte Lee OLB; 66 Don Shinnick OLB; 31 Steve Stonebreaker OLB; 51 Mike Strofolino MLB; Defensive backs (DB): 40 Bobby Boyd CB; 30 Alvin Haymond CB; 20 Jerry Logan SS; 43 Lenny Lyles CB; 26 Wendell Harris FS; 46 Jim Welch FS; Special teams (ST): 73 Tom Gilburg P	Practice squad: 42 George Harold CB; 80 Al Snyder WR; Reserve: 55 Jackie Burkett LB (IR); 15 Gary Cuozzo QB (IR); 61 Lou Kirouac T (IR); 19 Johnny Unitas QB (IR); Rookies in italics

== Regular season ==
=== Schedule ===
Week	Date	Opponent	Result	Record	Venue	Attendance
1	September 19	**Minnesota Vikings**	**W** 35–16	1–0	Memorial Stadium	56,562
2	September 26	at **Green Bay Packers**	**L** 17–20	1–1	Milwaukee County Stadium	48,130
3	October 3	**San Francisco 49ers**	**W** 27–24	2–1	Memorial Stadium	58,609
4	October 10	**Detroit Lions**	**W** 31–7	3–1	Memorial Stadium	60,238
5	October 17	at Washington Redskins	**W** 38–7	4–1	D.C. Stadium	50,405
6	October 24	**Los Angeles Rams**	**W** 35–20	5–1	Memorial Stadium	60,238
7	October 31	at **San Francisco 49ers**	**W** 34–28	6–1	Kezar Stadium	45,827
8	November 7	at **Chicago Bears**	**W** 26–21	7–1	Wrigley Field	45,656
9	November 14	at **Minnesota Vikings**	**W** 41–21	8–1	Metropolitan Stadium	47,426
10	November 21	Philadelphia Eagles	**W** 34–24	9–1	Memorial Stadium	60,238
11	November 25	at **Detroit Lions**	**T** 24–24	9–1–1	Tiger Stadium	55,036
12	December 5	**Chicago Bears**	**L** 0–13	9–2–1	Memorial Stadium	60,238
13	December 12	**Green Bay Packers**	**L** 27–42	9–3–1	Memorial Stadium	60,238
14	December 18	at **Los Angeles Rams**	**W** 20–17	10–3–1	Los Angeles Memorial Coliseum	46,636
Note: Intra-conference opponents are in **bold** text.

== Standings ==
NFL Western Conference
	W	L	T	PCT	CONF	PF	PA	STK
Green Bay Packers	10	3	1	.769	8–3–1	316	224	T1
Baltimore Colts	10	3	1	.769	8–3–1	389	284	W1
Chicago Bears	9	5	0	.643	7–5	409	275	L1
San Francisco 49ers	7	6	1	.538	6–5–1	421	402	T1
Minnesota Vikings	7	7	0	.500	5–7	383	403	W2
Detroit Lions	6	7	1	.462	4–7–1	257	295	W1
Los Angeles Rams	4	10	0	.286	2–10	269	328	L1

Note: Tie games were not officially counted in the standings until 1972.

== Postseason ==
The Western Conference playoff game was played at Lambeau Field in Green Bay the day after Christmas and the Colts led the Packers 10–0 at halftime. The Packers, with back-up quarterback Zeke Bratkowski in for injured Bart Starr, tied it up late in the fourth quarter on Don Chandler's controversial 22-yard field goal. Video replays appeared to show the kicked ball sailed well wide of the right upright—and the reaction of Chandler confirmed as much. The kick resulted in 1) a re-design of the goalposts, and 2) changing the placement of an official directly under each upright on field-goal attempts for the 1966 season.

Despite evidence to the contrary, the official in question, Jim Tunney (later known as "Dean of NFL Referees"), refused to admit his mistake, claiming that the flight of the ball over the goalpost had been affected by the wind before it veered to the right. The Packers won the game 13–10 in overtime with a 25-yard field goal. The following week the Packers defeated the Cleveland Browns for the NFL title, their third of five under head coach Vince Lombardi and first of three straight.

Round	Date	Opponent	Result	Record	Venue	Recap
Conference	December 26	at Green Bay Packers	L 10–13 (OT)	Lambeau Field	50,484	Recap
Playoff Bowl	January 9, 1966	Dallas Cowboys	W 35–3	Orange Bowl	65,569	-

== See also ==
- History of the Baltimore Colts
- Indianapolis Colts seasons
- 1965 NFL playoffs
