= Johnny Unitas =

American football player (1933–2002)

- Unitas with the Baltimore Colts in 1963

No. 19
- Position: Quarterback

Personal information
- Born: May 7, 1933; Pittsburgh, Pennsylvania, U.S.
- Died: September 11, 2002 (aged 69); Baltimore, Maryland, U.S.
- Listed height: 6 ft 1 in (1.85 m)
- Listed weight: 194 lb (88 kg)

Career information
- High school: St. Justin's (Pittsburgh)
- College: Louisville (1951–1954)
- NFL draft: 1955: 9th round, 102nd overall pick

Career history
- Pittsburgh Steelers (1955)*; Baltimore Colts (1956–1972); San Diego Chargers (1973)
- * Offseason or practice squad member only

Awards and highlights
- Super Bowl champion (V); 3× NFL champion (1958, 1959, 1968); 3× NFL Most Valuable Player (1959, 1964, 1967); NFL Man of the Year (1970); 5× First-team All-Pro (1958, 1959, 1964, 1965, 1967); 3× Second-team All-Pro (1957, 1960, 1963); 10× Pro Bowl (1957–1964, 1966, 1967); 4× NFL passing touchdowns leader (1957–1960); 4× NFL passing yards leader (1957, 1959, 1960, 1963); 3× NFL passer rating leader (1957, 1958, 1965); NFL completion percentage leader (1967); NFL 1960s All-Decade Team; NFL 50th Anniversary All-Time Team; NFL 75th Anniversary All-Time Team; NFL 100th Anniversary All-Time Team; Indianapolis Colts No. 19 retired; Louisville Cardinals No. 16 retired

Career NFL statistics
- Passing attempts: 5,186
- Passing completions: 2,830
- Completion percentage: 54.6%
- TD–INT: 290–253
- Passing yards: 40,239
- Passer rating: 78.2
- Rushing yards: 1,777
- Rushing touchdowns: 13
- Stats at Pro Football Reference
- Pro Football Hall of Fame

John Constantine Unitas (/juˈnaɪtəs/ (Note: Lithuanian: Jonas Konstantinas Jonaitis) yoo-NYTE-əs; May 7, 1933 – September 11, 2002) was an American professional football quarterback who played in the National Football League (NFL) for 18 seasons, primarily with the Baltimore Colts. Nicknamed "Johnny U." and "the Golden Arm", Unitas was considered the prototype of the modern era marquee quarterback and is regarded as one of the greatest NFL players of all time.

During his professional career from 1956 to 1973, Unitas set many NFL records and was named Most Valuable Player three times in 1959, 1964, and 1967, in addition to receiving 10 Pro Bowl and five first-team All-Pro honors. He helped lead the Colts to four championship titles: three in the pre-merger era in 1958, 1959, and 1968, and one in the Super Bowl era in Super Bowl V. His first championship victory is regarded as one of the league's greatest games and is credited with helping popularize the NFL. Between 1956 and 1960, he set the record for most consecutive games with a touchdown pass at 47, which he held for 52 years.

Unitas is one of only six players to be named to the NFL's 50th, 75th and 100th Anniversary All-Time Teams. He led the league in fourth quarter comebacks in six seasons, more than any other quarterback, and is praised for his development of the hurry-up offense. Unitas was inducted to the Pro Football Hall of Fame in 1979.

== Early life ==
John Constantine Unitas was born during the Great Depression on May 7, 1933, in Pittsburgh to Francis J. Unitas and Helen Superfisky, the third of four children. Both parents were of Lithuanian descent; his surname was a result of a phonetic transliteration of a common Lithuanian last name Jonaitis. The elder Unitas ran a modest coal delivery business. Unitas grew up in the Mount Washington neighborhood with a Catholic upbringing.

When Unitas was five years old, his father died of cardiovascular renal disease complicated by pneumonia, leaving the young boy and his siblings to be raised by their mother. When some relatives wanted to split up her children to different homes she refused, determined to keep the family together. She continued the coal delivery business, and worked as an office cleaner four nights a week, from 10 pm to 6 am.

At St. Justin's High School in Pittsburgh, Unitas played halfback and quarterback, becoming the best quarterback in the Catholic "B" League, under coach Max Carey. Hundreds of fans would come to his games to watch Unitas throw his "jump pass", which could be as far as 60 yards in the air. In his senior year, Unitas was named quarterback on Pittsburgh's All-Catholic High School Team.

== College career ==
In his younger years, Unitas dreamed about being part of the Notre Dame Fighting Irish football team, but when he tried out for the team, coach Frank Leahy said that he was just too skinny and he would "get murdered" if he was put on the field. Other sources say Leahy was not present at Unitas's workout for Notre Dame, and assistant coach Bernie Crimmins passed on Unitas, because he thought the team's fans could not accept a 135-pound quarterback. A later scholarship offer at the University of Pittsburgh was withdrawn. In 1952, Crimmins became Indiana University's head coach and attempted to recruit Unitas away from a collapsing Louisville program, but Unitas was loyal and stayed at Louisville.

Unitas attended the University of Louisville, under coach Frank Camp, after being recruited by young assistant coach Frank Gitschier. Gitschier would later teach Unitas the basics of quarterback play, give the introduction speech at Unitas's Hall of Fame induction in 1979, and in 2002 give a eulogy at Unitas's funeral. In his four-year career as a Louisville Cardinal, Unitas completed 245 passes for 3,139 yards and 27 touchdowns. Reportedly, the 6 ft 1 in (1.85 m) Unitas weighed 145 pounds (66 kg) on his first day of practice. His first start was in the fifth game of the 1951 season against St. Bonaventure (quarterbacked by future NFL player and coach Ted Marchibroda), where Unitas completed 11 consecutive passes and three touchdowns to give the Cardinals a 21–19 lead. Louisville ended up losing the game 22–21 on a disputed field goal, but found a new starting quarterback. Unitas also played safety on defense. Unitas completed 12 of 19 passes for 240 yards and four touchdowns in a 35–28 victory over Houston (a 19-point favorite), including a 92-yard touchdown pass. The team finished the season 5–4 overall and 4–1 with Unitas starting. He completed 46 of 99 passes for 602 yards and nine touchdowns (44).

In 1952, the team's motto was, "Unitas We Stand, Divided We Fall". However, the university had decided to de-emphasize sports. The new president at Louisville, Dr. Philip Grant Davidson, reduced the amount of athletic aid and tightened academic standards for athletes. As a result, 15 players scholarships were terminated. Unitas maintained his by taking on a new elective: square dancing. In 1952, coach Frank Camp switched the team to two-way football. Unitas not only played safety or linebacker on defense and quarterback on offense, but also returned kicks and punts on special teams. The Cardinals won their first game against Wayne State, and then Florida State in the second game. Unitas completed 16 of 21 passes for 198 yards and three touchdowns. In the next game against Florida State, Louisville won 41–14. While under the Seminole rush, Unitas, a right-hander, threw a left-handed pass between his legs for 15 yards, as reported by future Florida State quarterback Lee Corso who had seen film of the play and marveled at Unitas' quickness. The rest of the season was a struggle for the Cardinals, who finished 3–5. Unitas completed 106 of 198 passes for 1,540 yards and 12 touchdowns.

The team won their first game in 1953, against Murray State, and lost the rest for a record of 1–7. One of the most memorable games of the season came in a 59–6 loss against Tennessee, which was played in Knoxville, Tennessee. Unitas completed 9 out of 19 passes for 73 yards, rushed 9 times for 52 yards, returned six kickoffs for 85 yards, fielded one punt for three yards, and had 86 percent of the team's tackles. The only touchdown the team scored was in the fourth quarter when Unitas made a fake pitch to the running back and ran the ball 23 yards for a touchdown. His also kicked off and punted that day. When one of his teammates was injured in the third quarter, Unitas lifted him up and carried the injured man off the field.

Unitas himself was hurt later in the fourth quarter while trying to run the ball, and was helped off the field. As described by Bob Wilson of the Knoxville News-Sentinel, "'Battered and bruised, Unitas was helped off the field later in the final period as the [Tennessee] spectators saluted his gifted and courageous play with an ovation that resounded across Loudon Lake." When he got to the locker room he was so tired that his jersey and shoulder pads had to be cut off because he could not lift his arms. Louisville ended the season with a 20–13 loss to Eastern Kentucky. Unitas completed 49 of 95 passes for 470 yards and three touchdowns.

Unitas was elected captain for the 1954 season, but due to an early injury did not see much playing time. His first start was the third game of the season, against Florida State. Of the 34-man team, 21 were freshmen. The 1954 Cardinals went 3–6, with their last win at home against Morehead State. Unitas was slowed by so many injuries his senior year his 527 passing yards ended second to Jim Houser's 560.

During his time at Louisville, Unitas was 247 for 502 passing, for 2,912 yards and 27 touchdowns.

== Professional career ==
=== Pittsburgh Steelers ===
After his collegiate career, the Pittsburgh Steelers of the NFL drafted Unitas in the ninth round. However, he was released before the season began as the odd man out among four quarterbacks trying to fill three spots. Steelers' head coach Walt Kiesling had made up his mind about Unitas; he thought he was not smart enough to quarterback an NFL team, and he was not given any snaps in practice with the Steelers. Among those edging out Unitas was Ted Marchibroda, whom Unitas lost to in his first college game years earlier, future longtime NFL head coach. Out of pro football, Unitas—by this time married—worked in construction in Pittsburgh to support his family. On the weekends, he played quarterback, safety and punter on a local semi-professional team called the Bloomfield Rams for $6 a game.

=== Baltimore Colts ===
In 1956, Unitas joined the Baltimore Colts of the NFL under legendary coach Weeb Ewbank, after being asked at the last minute to join Bloomfield Rams lineman Jim Deglau, a Croatian steelworker with a life much like Unitas, at the latter's scheduled Colts tryout. The pair borrowed money from friends to pay for the gas to make the trip. Deglau later told a reporter after Unitas's death, "[His] uncle told him not to come. [He] was worried that if he came down and the Colts passed on him, it would look bad (to other NFL teams)." The Colts signed Unitas, much to the chagrin of the Cleveland Browns, who had hoped to claim the quarterback.

Unitas made his NFL debut with an inauspicious "mop-up" appearance against Detroit, which saw him throw two passes, with one resulting in an interception. Two weeks later, starting quarterback George Shaw suffered a broken leg against the Chicago Bears. In his first serious action, Unitas's initial pass was intercepted by J. C. Caroline and returned for a touchdown. Then he botched a hand-off on his next play, resulting in a fumble recovered by the Bears. Unitas rebounded quickly from that 58–27 loss, leading the Colts to an upset of Green Bay and their first win over Cleveland. He threw nine touchdown passes that year, including one in the season finale that started his record 47-game streak. His 55.6-percent completion mark was third in the league.

In 1957, his first season as the Colts full-time starter at quarterback, Unitas finished first in the NFL in passing yards (2,550), passer rating (88.0) and touchdown passes (24) as he helped lead the Colts to a 7–5 record, the first winning record in franchise history. At the end of the season, Unitas received the Jim Thorpe Trophy as the NFL's Most Valuable Player by the Newspaper Enterprise Association (NEA).

==== 1958: "The Greatest Game Ever Played" ====
Unitas continued his prowess in 1958 passing for 2,007 yards and 19 touchdowns as the Colts won the Western Conference title. The Colts won the NFL championship under his leadership on December 28, 1958, by defeating the New York Giants 23–17 in sudden death overtime on a touchdown by fullback Alan Ameche. It was the first overtime game in NFL history, and is often referred to as the "greatest game ever played". The game, nationally televised by NBC, has been credited for sparking the rise in popularity of professional football during the 1960s.

==== 1959 MVP season ====
In 1959, Unitas was named the NFL's MVP by the Associated Press (AP) for the first time, (Note: Contemporary sources and Pro-Football-Reference.com recognize Unitas as the 1959 AP MVP, while others, including the 2015 Official NFL Record and Fact Book, list Charlie Conerly as winning the award.) as well as United Press International's player of the year, after leading the NFL in passing yards (2,899), touchdown passes (32), and completions (193). He then led the Colts to a repeat championship, sparking a fourth quarter comeback to beat the Giants again 31–16 in the title game.

With the Colts fresh off back-to-back championships, Unitas was lauded by rookie head coach of the Green Bay Packers, Vince Lombardi, who said of the 26-year-old signal caller: "Without him, they're just ordinary. With him, they're great. He's the best quarterback I've ever seen."

==== Beginning of the 1960s ====
As the 1960s began, the Colts' fortunes (and win totals) declined. Injuries to key players such as Alan Ameche, Raymond Berry, and Lenny Moore were a contributing factor. Unitas's streak of 47 straight games with at least one touchdown pass ended against the Los Angeles Rams in week 11 of the 1960 season. In spite of this, he topped the 3,000-yard passing mark for the first time and led the league in touchdown passes for the fourth consecutive season.

After three middle-of-the-pack seasons, Colts owner Carroll Rosenbloom fired Weeb Ewbank and replaced him with Don Shula, who at the time was the youngest head coach in NFL history (33 years of age when he was hired). The Colts finished 8–6 in Shula's first season at the helm, good enough for only third place in the NFL's Western Conference, but they did end the season on a strong note by winning their final three games. The season was very successful for Unitas personally, as he led the NFL in passing yards with a career-best total of 3,481 and also led in completions with 237.

==== 1964 MVP season ====
In the 1964 season the Colts returned to the top of the Western Conference. After dropping their season opener to the Minnesota Vikings, the Colts ran off 10 straight victories to finish with a 12–2 record. The season was one of Unitas's best as he finished with 2,824 yards passing, a league-best 9.26 yards per pass attempt, 19 touchdown passes and only 6 interceptions. He was named the NFL's Most Valuable Player by the AP and UPI for a second time. However, the season ended on a disappointing note for the Colts, as they were upset by the Cleveland Browns in the 1964 NFL Championship Game, losing 27–0.

Unitas resumed his torrid passing in 1965, throwing for 2,530 yards, 23 touchdowns and finishing with a league-high and career-best 97.1 passer rating. But he was lost for the balance of the season due to a knee injury in a week 12 loss to the Bears. Backup quarterback Gary Cuozzo also suffered a season-ending injury the following week, and running back Tom Matte filled in as the emergency quarterback for the regular season finale and in a playoff loss to the Packers. The Colts and Packers finished in a tie for first place in the Western Conference, and a one-game playoff was played in Green Bay to decide who would be the conference representative in the 1965 NFL Championship Game. The Colts lost in overtime 13–10 due in large part to a game-tying field goal by Don Chandler that many, including Colts hall of fame coach Don Shula and Chandler himself years later, say was incorrectly ruled good.

Unitas, healthy once more, threw for 2,748 yards and 22 touchdowns in 1966 in a return to Pro Bowl form. However, he posted a league-high 24 interceptions.

==== 1967 MVP season ====
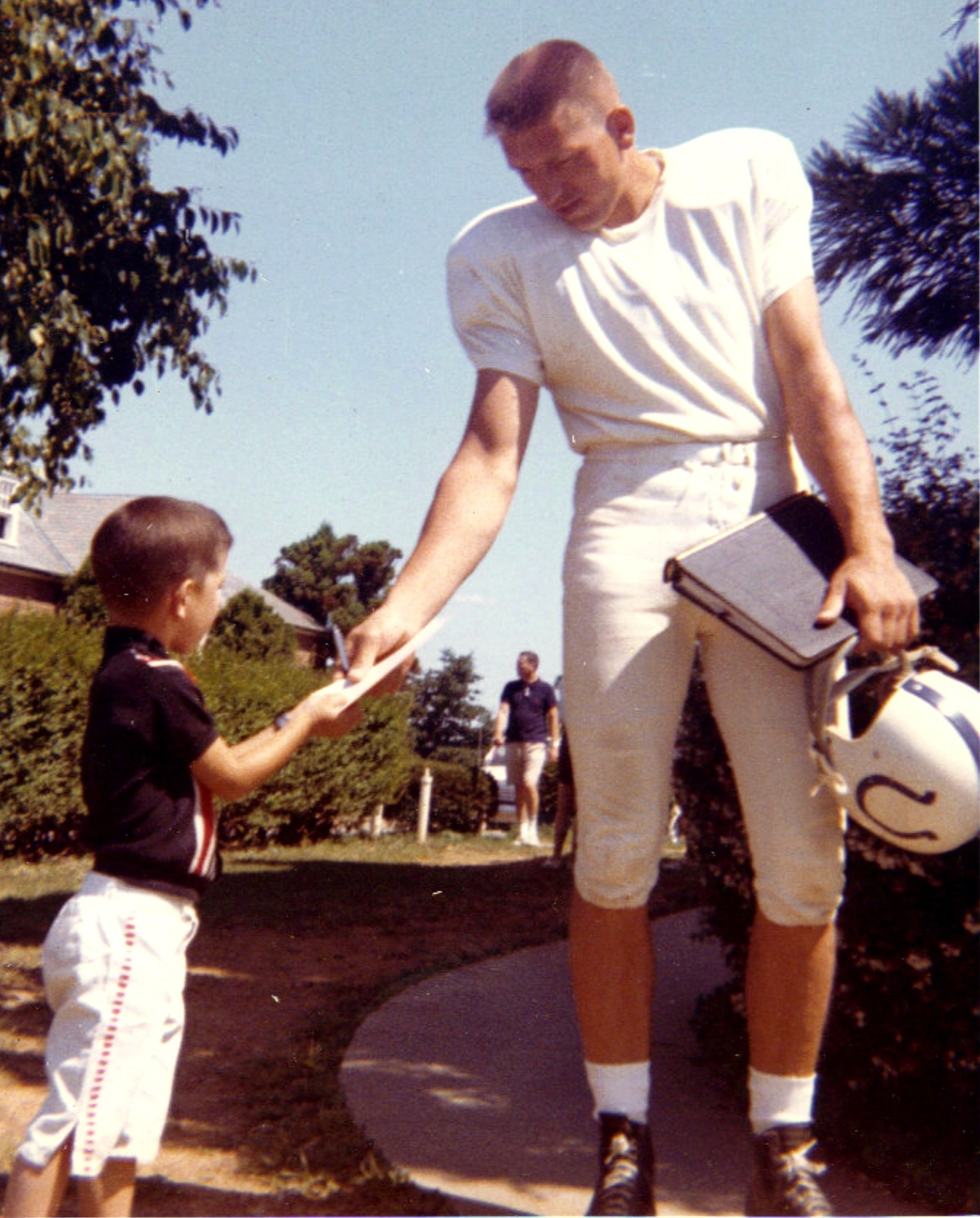
Unitas signing an autograph in 1964

After once again finishing second in the Western Conference in 1966, the Colts rebounded to finish 11–1–2 in 1967 tying the Los Angeles Rams for the NFL's best record. In winning his third MVP award from the AP and UPI in 1967 (and his second from the NEA), Unitas had a league-high 58.5 completion percentage and passed for 3,428 yards and 20 touchdowns. He openly complained about having tennis elbow and he threw eight interceptions and only three touchdown passes in the final five games. Once again, the season ended in loss for the Colts, as they were shut out of the newly instituted four-team NFL playoff after losing the divisional tiebreaker to the Rams, a 34–10 rout in the regular season finale.

==== Super Bowls and final Colt years ====
In the final game of the 1968 preseason, the muscles in Unitas's arm were torn when he was hit by a member of the Dallas Cowboys defense. Unitas wrote in his autobiography that he felt his arm was initially injured by the use of the "night ball" that the NFL was testing for better TV visibility during night games. In a post-game interview the previous year, he noted having constant pain in his elbow for several years prior. He would spend most of the season sitting on the bench. The Colts still marched to a league-best 13–1 record behind backup quarterback and ultimate 1968 NFL MVP Earl Morrall. Although he was injured through most of the season, Unitas came off the bench to play in Super Bowl III, the famous game where Joe Namath guaranteed a New York Jets win despite conventional wisdom. Although the Colts won an NFL Championship in 1968, they lost the Super Bowl to the AFL Champion Jets, thus becoming the first-ever NFL champions that were not also deemed world champions. Unitas helped put together the Colts' only score, a touchdown late in the game. Unitas also drove the Colts into scoring position following the touchdown and successful onside kick, but head coach Don Shula eschewed a field goal attempt, which (if successful) would have cut the Jets' lead to 16–10. Despite not playing until midway through the third quarter, Unitas still finished the game with more passing yards than Morrall.

After an off-season of rehabilitation on his elbow, Unitas rebounded in 1969, passing for 2,342 yards and 12 touchdowns with 20 interceptions. But the Colts finished with a disappointing 8–5–1 record and missed the playoffs.

In 1970, the NFL and AFL had merged into one league, and the Colts moved to the new American Football Conference, along with the Cleveland Browns and the Pittsburgh Steelers. He threw for 2,213 yards and 14 touchdowns while leading the Colts to an 11–2–1 season. In their first rematch with the Jets, Unitas and Namath threw a combined nine interceptions in a 29–22 Colts win. Namath threw 62 passes and broke his hand on the final play of the game, ending his season.

Unitas threw for 390 yards, three touchdowns, and no interceptions in AFC playoff victories over the Cincinnati Bengals and the Oakland Raiders. In Super Bowl V against the Dallas Cowboys, he was knocked out of the game with a rib injury in the second quarter, soon after throwing a 75-yard touchdown pass (setting a then-Super Bowl record) to John Mackey. However, he had also thrown two interceptions before his departure from the game. Earl Morrall came in to lead the team to a last-second, 16–13 victory.

In 1971, Unitas split playing time with Morrall, throwing only three touchdown passes. He started both playoff games, a win over the Cleveland Browns that sent the Colts to the AFC Championship Game against Don Shula and the Miami Dolphins, which they lost by a score of 21–0. Unitas threw three interceptions in the game, one of which was returned for a touchdown by safety Dick Anderson.

The 1972 season saw the Colts declining. After losing the season opener, Unitas was involved in the second and final regular season head-to-head meeting with "Broadway" Joe Namath. The first was in 1970 (won by the Colts, 29–22). The last meeting took place on September 24, 1972, at Memorial Stadium. He threw for 376 yards and three touchdowns, but Namath upstaged him again, bombing the Colts for 496 yards and six touchdowns in a 44–34 Jets victory – their first over Baltimore since the 1970 merger. After losing four of their first five games, the Colts fired head coach Don McCafferty, and benched Unitas.

One of the more memorable moments in football history came on Unitas's last game in a Colts uniform at Memorial Stadium, in a game against the Buffalo Bills. He was not the starter for this game, but the Colts were blowing the Bills out by a score of 28–0 behind Marty Domres; Unitas entered the game due to the fans chanting, "We want Unitas!!!", and a plan devised by head coach John Sandusky to convince Unitas that the starting quarterback was injured. Unitas came onto the field and threw two passes, one of which was a long touchdown to wide receiver Eddie Hinton which would be his last pass as a Colt. The Colts won the game by a score of 35–7. A small plane flew over the stadium trailing a banner that read, “Unitas We Stand”.

=== San Diego ===
Unitas was traded from the Colts to the San Diego Chargers on January 20, 1973, in a transaction that originally had future considerations returning to Baltimore. The deal's only obstacle was the personal services contract he had signed with the Colts in 1970 which would have kept him employed within the organization on an annual salary of $30,000 over ten years once his career as an active player ended. The pact had been signed when the ballclub was owned by Carroll Rosenbloom who subsequently acquired the Los Angeles Rams on July 13, 1972, in a franchise swap with Robert Irsay. The deal was completed when the Chargers purchased that contract. Eager to sever all ties with the Colts, Unitas signed a new two-year contract with the Chargers on June 8, 1973. He succeeded John Hadl who had requested and was granted a trade to the Rams.

Unitas started the season with a 38–0 loss to the Washington Redskins. He threw for just 55 yards and three interceptions and was sacked five times. His final victory as a starter came against the Buffalo Bills in week 2. Unitas was 10–18 for 175 yards, two touchdown passes, and no interceptions in a 34–7 Chargers rout.

Unitas threw two first-half interceptions, passed for only 19 yards, and went 2-for-9 against the Pittsburgh Steelers. He was then replaced by rookie quarterback and future Hall of Famer Dan Fouts. He made only one other game appearance, in the eighth game of the season against the Chiefs, throwing a single pass for an eight-yard gain. After posting a 1–3 record as a starter, and wanting to avoid suffering due to further injury, Unitas retired in the preseason of 1974, on July 25, 1974.

=== Records and accomplishments ===
Unitas won three NFL championships (1958, 1959, 1970), and three MVP awards (1959, 1964, 1967). He was first-team All Pro five times (1958, 1959, 1964, 1965, 1967), and second team All-Pro three times (1957, 1960, 1963). He was also chosen for ten Pro Bowls (1957–1964, 1966, 1967). He was the league's passing yards leader four times (1957, 1959, 1960, 1963), led the NFL in touchdown passes four times (1957–1960) and led the NFL in passer rating twice (1958, 1965).

Unitas led the NFL in fourth quarter comebacks six times (1958, 1961, 1962, 1965, 1967, and 1970), more than any other quarterback. He is credited with laying the foundation for the two-minute drill.

His 32 touchdown passes in 1959 were a record at the time, making Unitas the first quarterback to hit the 30 touchdown mark in a season. Early in his career he broke the single season records for completion percentage by a rookie (1956), total passing yards (1960), total completions (1963), and yards per passing attempt (1964). His 47-game consecutive touchdown streak between 1956 and 1960 was a record considered by many to be unbreakable. He led the league in touchdown passes from 1957 to 1960. The streak stood for 52 years before being broken by New Orleans Saints quarterback Drew Brees in a game against the San Diego Chargers on October 7, 2012.

Unitas finished his 18 NFL seasons with 2,830 completions in 5,186 attempts for 40,239 yards and 290 touchdowns, with 253 interceptions. He also rushed for 1,777 yards and 13 touchdowns. Plagued by arm trouble in his later seasons, he threw more interceptions (64) than touchdowns (38) in 1968–1973. After averaging 215.8 yards per game in his first 12 seasons, his production fell to 124.4 in his final six. His passer rating plummeted from 82.9 to 60.4 for the same periods. Even so, Unitas set many passing records during his career. He was the first quarterback to throw for more than 40,000 yards, despite playing during an era when NFL teams played shorter seasons of 12 or 14 games (as opposed to today's 17-game seasons) and prior to modern passing-friendly rules implemented in 1978.

Unitas was selected to the NFL's All-Decade Team of the 1960s, the NFL's 50th Anniversary Team, the NFL's 75th Anniversary Team and the NFL 100th Anniversary All-Time Team. He was selected Player of the Decade for the 1960s, and named "Greatest Player in the First 50 Years of Pro Football".

== Different era ==
=== Rule changes and statistical differences ===
Unitas played his entire career in what is sometimes called the "dead ball" era, before the 1978 NFL rule changes made to favor passing offense. The two key rules being the "Mel Blount Rule" limiting the amount of physical play a defender can use against a receiver, and the rule allowing offensive lineman to extend and grab while blocking instead of keeping their fists closed. The top four Hall of Fame quarterback ratings from the dead ball era are Sonny Jurgenson (82.62), Len Dawson (82.56), Bart Starr (80.47), and Unitas (78.2). There are 34 modern quarterbacks with ratings higher than Jurgenson, with thirteen above a 90 rating. Thus, it has been said that the records from the two eras cannot be fairly compared. It has also been argued that the 1978 rule changes, and ensuing rule changes since to favor the offense, have had as much or more impact on raising quarterback statistics to higher and higher numbers, as increasing the number of games played in a season from 12 to 17 since the 1950s have had.

=== Rule changes and quarterback protection ===
More rules aimed at protecting quarterbacks from physical harm also have been implemented since Unitas retired. In describing Unitas in 2002 after his death, Sports Illustrated writer Paul Zimmerman observed of this earlier era, "The NFL hadn't liberalized the passing rules. His receivers could get mugged downfield. Defensive linemen could head-slap their way into the backfield, and when they homed in on a quarterback they could hit him any way they wanted. None of today's cellophane-wrapper protection from the officials. ... And Unitas got hit plenty." Upton Bell, former Colts and Patriots executive and son of NFL Commissioner Bert Bell, in comparing Unitas to modern quarterbacks stated, "They damaged quarterbacks in previous eras. Today they try to preserve them." Bell observed the effects on a quarterback's passing if he knew he would be hit after throwing (old rules) or not (modern rules), and how the best quarterbacks of the modern era would not have been healthy enough to play at a high level into their later thirties if they had been subjected to the unchecked violent play of earlier eras.

The Colts played the most brutal game in their history on November 13, 1960, in Chicago against the Chicago Bears. Unitas once said that Bears coach George Halas offered $500 to any player knocking Unitas out of the game. In the same game, Gino Marchetti said he was hit high and at the knees by two Bears simultaneously, the hardest he was ever hit in a football game, one of the Bears later apologizing that Halas had told them to do it. With 17 seconds left in the game (Bears up 20–17), Unitas said that Hall of Fame Bears middle linebacker Bill George had Unitas by the legs after a blitz, the ball having been thrown, holding Unitas upright at the behest of Hall of Fame defensive end Doug Adkins whose ensuing tackle hit Unitas in the head.

Unitas' nose was busted and blood was pouring out; he would have a scar on the bridge of his nose for the rest of his life. The trainers could not stanch the bleeding, and Unitas refused to leave the game. He scooped up mud from the field and gave it to offensive lineman Alex Sandusky (or Dick Szymanski in other tellings) who shoved it into Unitas' nostrils. Unitas continued the game, throwing a 37-yard touchdown pass to Lenny Moore for a Colts victory. However, the battered Colts did not win another game the rest of the season, and lost their opportunity for a third consecutive world championship.

The 6 ft 8 in (2.03 m) and 257 lb (117 kg) Adkins stated it was not his intention to hurt Unitas, as his shoulder pad inadvertently got under Unitas' helmet. He said Unitas was the greatest of all the great players of that time, and the best player Adkins played against because Unitas was so tough. In describing Unitas' last second pass to Moore that day, Adkins said, "You had to beat [Unitas] the whole 60 minutes." Hall of Fame defensive tackle, and NFL 100th Anniversary All Time teammate of both Adkins and Unitas, Merlin Olsen said of Unitas, "'The thing that makes Johnny Unitas the greatest of all time isn't his arm or even his football sense. ... It's his courage.'"

== Post-playing years ==
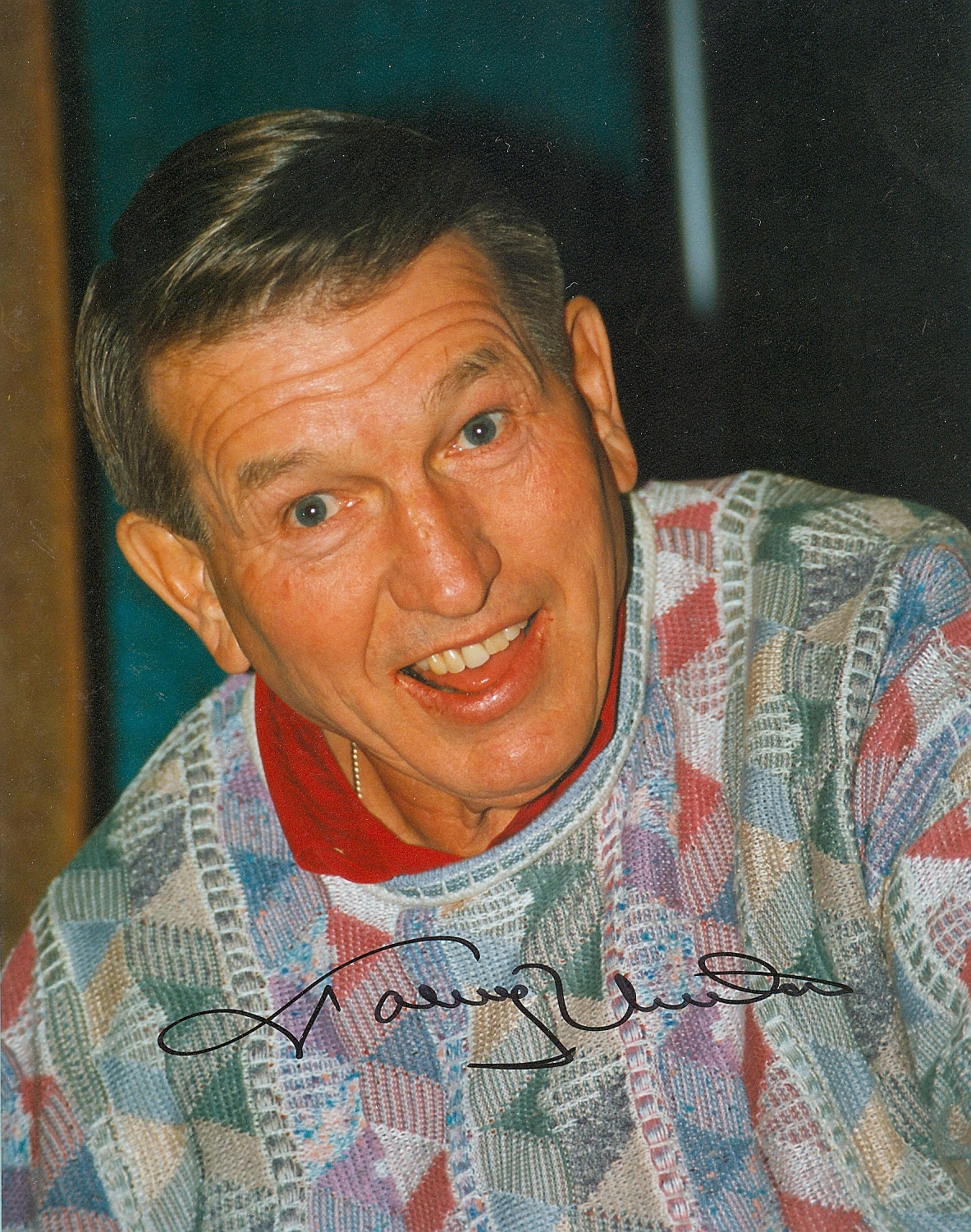
A signed photograph of Unitas in his later years

After his playing days were finished, Unitas settled in Baltimore where he raised his family while also pursuing a career in broadcasting, doing color commentary for NFL games on CBS in the 1970s. He was elected to the Pro Football Hall of Fame in 1979. He was said to be in tune with the psyche of Baltimore, and former Maryland Governor and Baltimore Mayor William Donald Schaefer said, "He never passed anybody by. ... He gave the city hope.'" In 1999, NFL Films and HBO produced a documentary about Unitas. Pro Football Hall of Fame writer Ray Didinger, one of the program's writers and producers, emphasized that they wanted to show the relationship between the Colts and Baltimore as a powerful part of Unitas's story.

After Robert Irsay moved the Colts franchise to Indianapolis in 1984, a move known to this day in Baltimore as "Bob Irsay's Midnight Ride," he was so outraged that he cut all ties to the relocated team (though his No. 19 jersey is still retired by the Colts), declaring himself strictly a Baltimore Colt for the remainder of his life. Some other prominent old-time Colts followed his lead, although many attended the 1975 team's reunion at Lucas Oil Stadium in Indianapolis in 2009. A total of 39 Colts players from that 1975 team attended said reunion in Indianapolis, including Bert Jones and Lydell Mitchell. Unitas asked the Pro Football Hall of Fame on numerous occasions (including on Roy Firestone's film Up Close) to remove his display unless it was listed as belonging to the Baltimore Colts. The Hall of Fame has never complied with the request. Unitas donated his Colts memorabilia to the Babe Ruth Museum in Baltimore. They were on display at the Sports Legends Museum at Camden Yards until its closure in 2015.

Unitas was inducted into the American Football Association's Semi Pro Football Hall of Fame in 1987.

Unitas actively lobbied for another NFL team to come to Baltimore. After the football organization that made up the original Cleveland Browns moved to Baltimore in 1996 and established the Baltimore Ravens, he and some of the other old-time Colts attended the Ravens' first game ever against the Raiders on Opening Day at Memorial Stadium. He was frequently seen on the Ravens' sidelines at home games (most prominently in 1998 when the now-Indianapolis Colts played the Ravens in Baltimore) and received a thunderous ovation every time he was pictured on each of the huge widescreens at M&T Bank Stadium. He was often seen on the 30-yard line on the Ravens side.

When the NFL celebrated its first 50 years, Unitas was voted the league's best player. Green Bay Packers Hall of Fame middle linebacker Ray Nitschke said of Unitas, "'What a tough guy and what a leader. ... He was the best I ever faced'". Retired Bears quarterback Sid Luckman said of Unitas, "He was better than me, better than Sammy Baugh, better than anyone." Hall of Fame player, and NFL coach, Raymond Berry said that what made Unitas unique "was his uncanny instinct for calling the right play at the right time, his icy composure under fire, his fierce competitiveness and his utter disregard for his own safety".

== NFL career statistics ==
Legend
| | AP NFL MVP |
| | Won the NFL championship |
| | Won the Super Bowl |
| | Led the league |
| **Bold** | Career high |
| Underline | Incomplete data |

=== Regular season ===
| Year | Team | Games | | | Passing | | | | | | | | | Rushing | | | | | Sacked | | Fum | 4QC | GWD |
| Year | Team | GP | GS | Record | Cmp | Att | Pct | Yds | Y/A | Lng | TD | Int | Rtg | Att | Yds | Y/A | Lng | TD | Sck | SckY | Fum | 4QC | GWD |
|---|---|---|---|---|---|---|---|---|---|---|---|---|---|---|---|---|---|---|---|---|---|---|---|
| 1956 | BAL | 12 | 7 | 3–4 | 110 | 198 | 55.6 | 1,498 | 7.6 | 54 | 9 | 10 | 74.0 | 28 | 155 | **5.5** | **34** | 1 | — | 202 | 4 | 1 | 3 |
| 1957^{†} | BAL | 12 | 12 | 7–5 | 172 | 301 | 57.1 | 2,550 | 8.5 | 82 | 24 | 17 | 88.0 | 42 | 171 | 4.1 | 24 | 1 | — | 212 | 7 | 3 | 3 |
| 1958 | BAL | 10 | 9 | 8–1 | 136 | 263 | 51.7 | 2,007 | 7.6 | 77 | 19 | 7 | 90.0 | 33 | 139 | 4.2 | 28 | **3** | — | 120 | 5 | 3 | 2 |
| 1959 | BAL | 12 | 12 | 9–3 | 193 | 367 | 52.6 | 2,899 | 7.9 | 71 | **32** | 14 | 92.0 | 29 | 145 | 5.0 | 21 | 2 | — | 185 | 6 | 2 | 3 |
| 1960 | BAL | 12 | 12 | 6–6 | 190 | 378 | 50.3 | 3,099 | 8.2 | 80 | 25 | **24** | 73.7 | 36 | 195 | 5.4 | 27 | 0 | 18 | 190 | 8 | 1 | 2 |
| 1961 | BAL | 14 | 14 | 8–6 | 229 | 420 | 54.5 | 2,990 | 7.1 | 72 | 16 | **24** | 66.1 | **54** | 190 | 3.5 | 18 | 2 | 28 | 216 | 9 | 3 | **4** |
| 1962 | BAL | 14 | 14 | 7–7 | 222 | 389 | 57.1 | 2,967 | 7.6 | 80 | 23 | 23 | 76.5 | 50 | 137 | 2.7 | 25 | 0 | 31 | 255 | 5 | 3 | 3 |
| 1963 | BAL | 14 | 14 | 8–6 | 237 | 410 | 57.8 | **3,481** | 8.5 | 64 | 20 | 12 | 89.7 | 47 | **224** | 4.8 | 26 | 0 | **42** | **298** | **13** | 3 | 3 |
| 1964 | BAL | 14 | 14 | **12–2** | 158 | 305 | 51.8 | 2,824 | **9.3** | 74 | 19 | 6 | 96.4 | 37 | 162 | 4.4 | 20 | 2 | 37 | 254 | 6 | 2 | 2 |
| 1965 | BAL | 11 | 11 | 8–2–1 | 164 | 282 | 58.2 | 2,530 | 9.0 | 61 | 23 | 12 | **97.4** | 17 | 68 | 4.0 | 18 | 1 | 29 | 221 | 7 | 3 | 2 |
| 1966 | BAL | 14 | 13 | 9–4 | 195 | 348 | 56.0 | 2,748 | 7.9 | **89** | 22 | **24** | 74.0 | 20 | 44 | 2.2 | 16 | 1 | 21 | 146 | 5 | 1 | 1 |
| 1967 | BAL | 14 | 14 | 11–1–2 | **255** | **436** | **58.5** | 3,428 | 7.9 | 88 | 20 | 16 | 83.6 | 22 | 89 | 4.0 | 13 | 0 | 25 | 198 | 4 | **4** | 3 |
| 1968 | BAL | 5 | 0 | — | 11 | 32 | 34.4 | 139 | 4.3 | 37 | 2 | 4 | 30.1 | 3 | −1 | −0.3 | 5 | 0 | 2 | 15 | 3 | 0 | 1 |
| 1969 | BAL | 13 | 12 | 7–5 | 178 | 327 | 54.4 | 2,342 | 7.2 | 52 | 12 | 20 | 64.0 | 11 | 23 | 2.1 | 13 | 0 | 12 | 93 | 2 | 2 | 3 |
| 1970 | BAL | 14 | 13 | 10–2–1 | 166 | 321 | 51.7 | 2,213 | 6.9 | 55 | 14 | 18 | 65.1 | 9 | 16 | 1.8 | 9 | 0 | 19 | 158 | 2 | 3 | 3 |
| 1971 | BAL | 13 | 5 | 3–2 | 92 | 176 | 52.3 | 942 | 5.4 | 35 | 3 | 9 | 52.3 | 9 | 5 | 0.6 | 3 | 0 | 15 | 129 | 3 | 0 | 0 |
| 1972 | BAL | 8 | 5 | 1–4 | 88 | 157 | 56.1 | 1,111 | 7.1 | 63 | 4 | 6 | 70.8 | 3 | 15 | 5.0 | 8 | 0 | 14 | 114 | 3 | 0 | 0 |
| 1973 | SD | 5 | 4 | 1–3 | 34 | 76 | 44.7 | 471 | 6.2 | 51 | 3 | 7 | 40.0 | 0 | 0 | — | 0 | 0 | 14 | 96 | 3 | 0 | 0 |
| Career | | 211 | 185 | 118–63–4 | 2,830 | 5,186 | 54.6 | 40,239 | 7.8 | 89 | 290 | 253 | 78.2 | 450 | 1,777 | 3.9 | 34 | 13 | 307 | 3,090 | 95 | 34 | 38 |

- ^† In 1957, Unitas was named MVP by the Newspaper Enterprise Association and the Touchdown Club of Columbus.

=== Postseason ===
| Year | Team | Games | | | Passing | | | | | | | | | Rushing | | | | | Sacked | | Fum | 4QC | GWD |
| Year | Team | GP | GS | Record | Cmp | Att | Pct | Yds | Y/A | Lng | TD | Int | Rtg | Att | Yds | Y/A | Lng | TD | Sck | SckY | Fum | 4QC | GWD |
|---|---|---|---|---|---|---|---|---|---|---|---|---|---|---|---|---|---|---|---|---|---|---|---|
| 1958 | BAL | 1 | 1 | 1–0 | 26 | 40 | **65.0** | 349 | 8.7 | 60 | 1 | 1 | 90.5 | **6** | 20 | 3.3 | 15 | 0 | — | 27 | **1** | **1** | **1** |
| 1959 | BAL | 1 | 1 | 1–0 | 18 | 29 | 62.1 | 264 | **9.1** | 59 | 2 | 0 | **114.7** | 2 | 6 | 3.0 | 4 | **1** | — | **57** | 0 | **1** | **1** |
| 1964 | BAL | 1 | 1 | 0–1 | 12 | 20 | 60.0 | 95 | 4.8 | 23 | 0 | 2 | 32.3 | **6** | 30 | 5.0 | 16 | 0 | 2 | 6 | 0 | 0 | 0 |
| 1968 | BAL | 1 | 0 | — | 11 | 24 | 45.8 | 110 | 4.6 | 21 | 0 | 1 | 42.0 | 1 | 0 | 0.0 | 0 | 0 | 0 | 0 | 0 | 0 | 0 |
| 1970 | BAL | 3 | 3 | **3–0** | 20 | 56 | 35.7 | **478** | 8.5 | **75** | **4** | 2 | 76.3 | 5 | **31** | **6.2** | **17** | 0 | **5** | 24 | **1** | 0 | 0 |
| 1971 | BAL | 2 | 2 | 1–1 | **33** | **57** | 57.9 | 367 | 6.4 | 27 | 0 | **4** | 47.9 | 1 | 5 | 5.0 | 5 | 0 | 3 | 15 | **1** | 0 | 0 |
| Career | | 9 | 8 | 6–2 | 120 | 226 | 53.1 | 1,663 | 7.4 | 75 | 7 | 10 | 68.9 | 21 | 92 | 4.4 | 17 | 1 | 10 | 129 | 3 | 2 | 2 |

=== Super Bowl ===
| Year | SB | Team | Opp. | Passing | | | | | | | | Rushing | | | | Result |
| Year | SB | Team | Opp. | Cmp | Att | Pct | Yds | Y/A | TD | Int | Rtg | Att | Yds | Y/A | TD | Result |
|---|---|---|---|---|---|---|---|---|---|---|---|---|---|---|---|---|
| 1968 | III | BAL | NYJ | **11** | **24** | **45.8** | **110** | 4.6 | 0 | 1 | 42.0 | **1** | 0 | 0.0 | 0 | L 16–7 |
| 1970 | V | BAL | DAL | 3 | 9 | 33.3 | 88 | **9.8** | **1** | 2 | **68.1** | **1** | **4** | **4.0** | 0 | **W** 16–13 |
| Career | | | | 14 | 33 | 42.4 | 198 | 6.0 | 1 | 3 | 34.7 | 2 | 4 | 2.0 | 0 | W−L 1–1 |

== Personal life ==
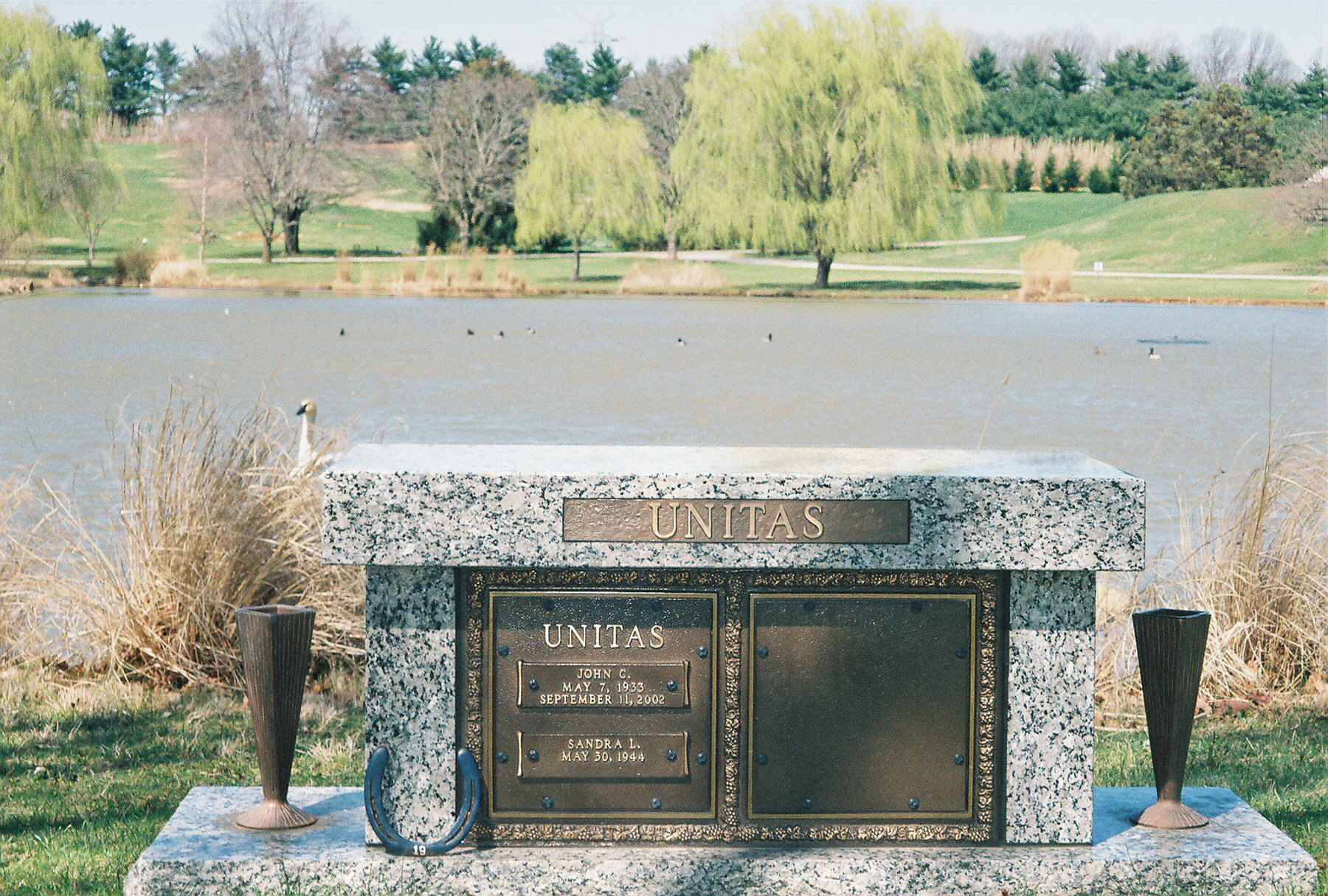
The gravesite of Unitas in Timonium, Maryland

On November 20, 1954, Unitas, at age 21, married his high school sweetheart Dorothy Hoelle. They lived in Towson, Maryland and had five children before divorcing. Unitas's second wife was Sandra Lemon, whom he married on June 26, 1972. They had three children, lived in Baldwin, and remained married until his death.

Towson University, where Unitas was a major fund-raiser and which his children attended, named its football and lacrosse complex Johnny Unitas Stadium in recognition of both his football career and service to the university.

Toward the end of his life, Unitas brought media attention to the many permanent physical disabilities that he and his fellow players suffered during their careers before heavy padding and other safety features became popular. Unitas had both knees replaced because of an injury in a 1963 Bears game. As the result of an injury to his right arm and elbow first suffered against the Dallas Cowboys in 1968, he eventually could not pick up a fork to feed himself with his right hand in later years. Also, his fingers had been repeatedly broken over the years, and he had no use of the middle three fingers on his right hand. He would slowly sign autographs with his thumb and little finger, and play golf by strapping his hand to the club with a Velcro strip. He could not perform any physical activity more strenuous than golf due to his artificial knees.

In 1997, a five-hour surgery on the arm was not successful. He sought league financed disability payments, but was refused because he was receiving a pension and had not sought disability by age 55, even though the severe hand problem did not arise until he was 60. Although his hand was virtually useless, the league also said he was not totally and permanently disabled. Shortly after his death, an opinion column noted that it was "a sad commentary on a league that Unitas helped bring into the television age. It was his mastery of the game that attracted countless numbers of fans to the sport and television."

In 1991, Unitas and his wife filed for bankruptcy protection under Chapter 11. Their court filings showed that the couple owed creditors as much as $3.2 million but had assets of about $1.4 million. His financial problems arose in part from a business venture in which he and two partners took out loans to buy National Circuits Inc., a maker of printed circuit boards, and the firm subsequently failed.

On September 11, 2002, Unitas died from a heart attack while exercising at the Kernan Physical Therapy Center (now The University of Maryland Rehabilitation & Orthopaedic Institute) in Baltimore. His funeral was held at Cathedral of Mary Our Queen in Baltimore. Unitas was buried at Dulaney Valley Memorial Gardens in Timonium, Maryland.

Between his death and October 4, 2002, 56,934 people signed an online petition urging the Baltimore Ravens to rename the Ravens' home stadium (owned by the State of Maryland) after Unitas. These requests were unsuccessful since the lucrative naming rights had already been leased by the Ravens to Buffalo-based M&T Bank. However, on October 20, 2002, the Ravens dedicated the front area of the stadium's main entrance as Unitas Plaza and unveiled a statue of Unitas as the centerpiece of the plaza; as well as adding Unitas and the other Baltimore Colt hall of famers (Lenny Moore, Art Donovan, Jim Parker, Raymond Berry, and John Mackey) to the Ravens Ring of Honor.

== Legacy ==
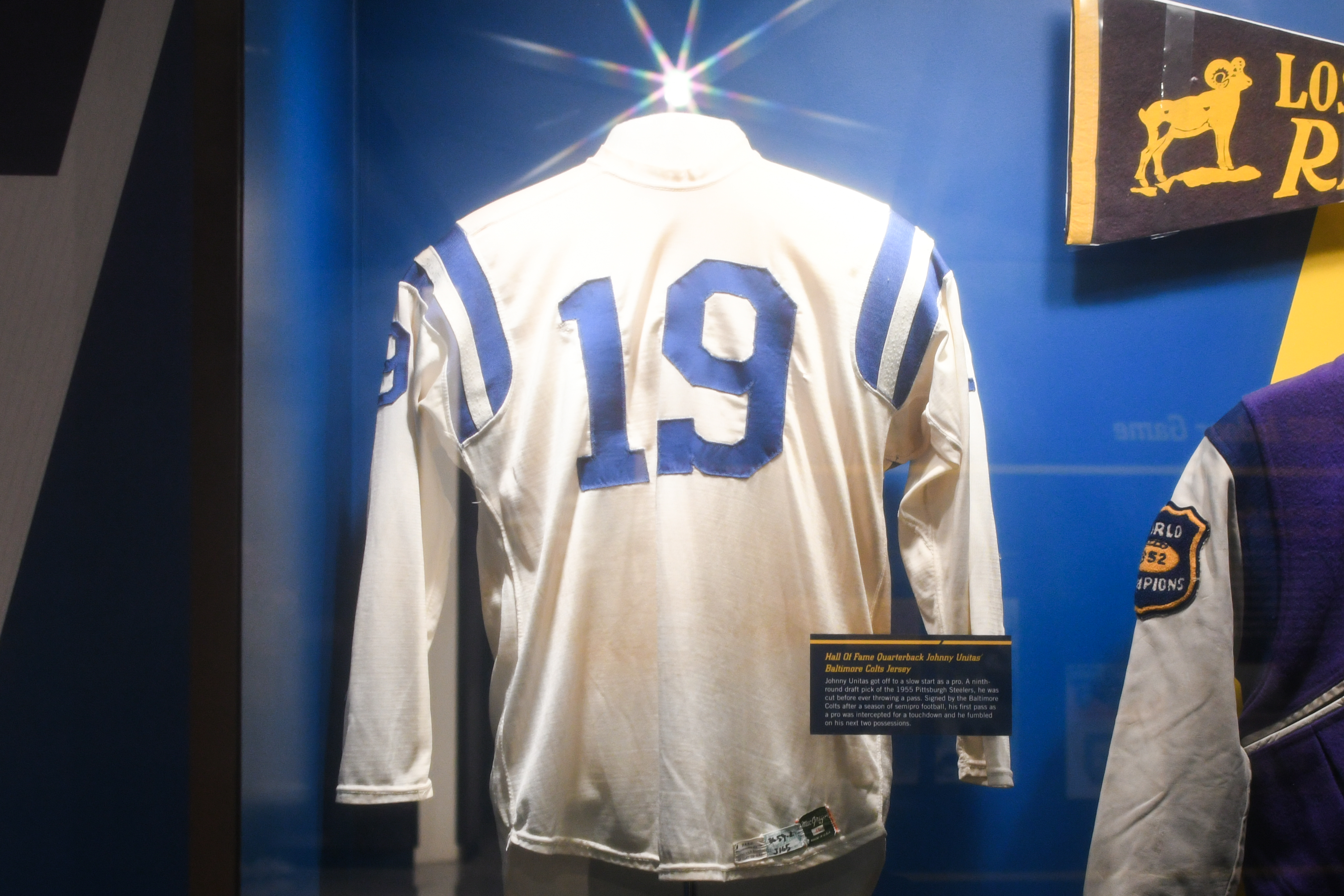
Unitas jersey exhibited at the Pro Football Hall of Fame

- Unitas held the record for most Pro Bowl appearances (10) by a quarterback until Brett Favre broke his record in 2009.
- Unitas set the original standard for most wins as a starting quarterback with 118 regular season victories (since surpassed by multiple quarterbacks).
- Unitas was voted into the Pro Football Hall of Fame in 1979.
- Laid the foundation for the modern two-minute drill.
- Unitas is 11th in all-time number of regular season games won by an NFL starting quarterback with 118 wins.
- Unitas is 16th in all-time percentage of regular season games won by an NFL starting quarterback with a percentage of 64.5.
- Unitas was inducted into the American Football Association Semi Pro Hall of Fame in 1987.
- Unitas's no. 16 is the first number retired by the football program at the University of Louisville.
- Unitas Tower, a dormitory at the University of Louisville, is named for Johnny Unitas.
- The Johnny Unitas Football Museum is in the Cardinal Football Complex at Louisville.
- A statue of Unitas sits in the north end zone of Cardinal Stadium at the University of Louisville. It is a tradition for each Cardinal player to touch the statue as he enters the field.
- Since 1987, the Johnny Unitas Golden Arm Award has been awarded to the top senior quarterback of the current year in college football. The award is presented annually in Louisville. Among the winners was University of Tennessee, and future Colt, quarterback Peyton Manning.
- In 1999, he was ranked No. 5 on The Sporting News list of the 100 Greatest Football Players, behind only Joe Montana among quarterbacks.
- In 2004, The Sporting News ranked Unitas No. 1 among the NFL's 50 Greatest Quarterbacks, with Joe Montana at No. 2.
- In 1999, ESPN's Sportscentury: 50 Greatest Athletes of the 20th Century ranked Unitas No. 32.
- Just before his death, Johnny Unitas became the community liaison for athletics in Towson, Maryland. The football stadium at Towson University was renamed Johnny Unitas Stadium in 2002. Unitas died less than a week after throwing his last pass in the grand opening of the stadium.
- Set the record for consecutive games with at least one touchdown pass at 47 games. This record was surpassed by Drew Brees in 2012.
- Set the record for consecutive games with at least two touchdown passes at 12 games. This record was surpassed by Don Meredith, Peyton Manning (twice), Tom Brady, Aaron Rodgers, Philip Rivers, and Patrick Mahomes.
- Set the record for most consecutive games with at least a 120 passer rating (4); this record was later matched by Kurt Warner.
- For the game following his death, Indianapolis Colts quarterback Peyton Manning asked to wear a pair of black cleats as a tribute to Johnny's signature black boots. The league denied his request and threatened Manning with a US$25,000 fine; Manning decided not to wear them. Despite the threatened fine, Chris Redman, a Louisville alum like Unitas, and then quarterback of the Baltimore Ravens, decided to pay homage by wearing the signature cleats during a game against the Tampa Bay Buccaneers. Manning later said he regretted not doing it, and that every quarterback in the league should have done it that day to honor Unitas.
- In 2013, a movie project was announced by The Baltimore Sun called Unitas We Stand, which will feature Ravens quarterback Joe Flacco as Unitas during the 1958 NFL Championship.
- 19th Street in Ocean City, Maryland, is named "Johnny Unitas Way" in his honor.
- Johnny Unitas Stadium on the campus of Towson University in Towson, Maryland, home of the Towson Tigers football and Towson Tigers men's lacrosse teams is named in his honor.
- Unitas was posthumously inducted into the National Lithuanian American Hall of Fame on August 24, 2013.
- Readers of NFL.com voted Unitas the Greatest Quarterback of All Time in 2014. Unitas scored 72 percent of the vote over Joe Montana, after the two quarterbacks were the final ones remaining out of a bracket of players over the history of the NFL.
- There is an historical marker dedicated to Unitas in Pittsburgh.
- In 1999, HBO and NFL Films produced a documentary, Unitas, about Unitas, his life, career and impact, and his relationship to Baltimore, narrated by actor Liev Schreiber, including interviews with Unitas, Jim Brown, Frank Deford, and Raymond Berry, among others.
- Unitas was featured twice on the television series The Simpsons, first in the episode "Homie the Clown", in which Unitas (voiced by himself) encourages the usage of the Krusty Moustache Removal System in a non-stop infomercial. In "Mother Simpson", Homer's father admires Unitas' short hair in contrast to Joe Namath's controversial sideburns, calling it "a haircut you could set your watch to".
- Unitas played the head coach of the Dallas Knights in Oliver Stone's 1999 film Any Given Sunday.
- Unitas is referenced in the 1991 movie Point Break. One of the characters in the movie said "They got me babysitting some quarterback punk, named Johnny Unitas or something", when they get a new partner.
- Unitas is referenced in a 1992 episode of the Nickelodeon television show The Adventures of Pete & Pete titled "Space, Geeks and Johnny Unitas."
- Unitas played himself in the 1976 Disney movie Gus.

== See also ==
- List of most consecutive starts by a National Football League quarterback
- Most wins by a starting quarterback (NFL)
