= NFL 1960s All-Decade Team =

Official list of the NFL's best players in the 1960s

This is a list of National Football League (NFL) players who had outstanding performances throughout the 1960s and have been compiled together into this fantasy group. The team was selected by voters of the Pro Football Hall of Fame at the end of the decade. Players that also made the National Football League 1970s All-Decade Team were Bob Lilly, Dick Butkus, Merlin Olsen, Larry Wilson, and Jim Bakken.

== Players ==
All information can be Referenced at the Hall of Fame website
Position	Player	Team(s)	Years	Hall of Fame Class
=== Offense ===
Quarterback	Johnny Unitas	Baltimore Colts	1956–1972	1979
Quarterback	Johnny Unitas	San Diego Chargers	1973	1979
Quarterback	Bart Starr	Green Bay Packers	1956–1971	1977
Quarterback	Sonny Jurgensen	Philadelphia Eagles	1957–1963	1983
Quarterback	Sonny Jurgensen	Washington Redskins	1964–1974	1983
Halfback	John David Crow	Chicago Cardinals/St. Louis Cardinals	1958–1964	Not inducted
Halfback	John David Crow	San Francisco 49ers	1965–1968	Not inducted
Halfback	Paul Hornung	Green Bay Packers	1957–1962, 1964–1966	1986
Halfback	Leroy Kelly	Cleveland Browns	1964–1973	1994
Halfback	Gale Sayers	Chicago Bears	1965–1971	1977
Fullback	Jim Brown	Cleveland Browns	1957–1965	1971
Fullback	Jim Taylor	Green Bay Packers	1958–1966	1976
Fullback	Jim Taylor	New Orleans Saints	1967	1976
Split End	Del Shofner	Los Angeles Rams	1957–1960	Not inducted
Split End	Del Shofner	New York Giants	1961–1967	Not inducted
Split End	Charley Taylor	Washington Redskins	1964–1975, 1977	1984
Flankers	Gary Collins	Cleveland Browns	1962–1971	Not inducted
Flankers	Boyd Dowler	Green Bay Packers	1959–1969	Not inducted
Flankers	Boyd Dowler	Washington Redskins	1971	Not inducted
Tight end	John Mackey	Baltimore Colts	1963–1971	1992
Tight end	John Mackey	San Diego Chargers	1972	1992
Tackle	Bob Brown	Philadelphia Eagles	1964–1968	2004
Tackle	Bob Brown	Los Angeles Rams	1969–1970	2004
Tackle	Bob Brown	Oakland Raiders	1971–1973	2004
Tackle	Forrest Gregg	Green Bay Packers	1956, 1958–1970	1977
Tackle	Forrest Gregg	Dallas Cowboys	1971	1977
Tackle	Ralph Neely	Dallas Cowboys	1965–1977	Not inducted
Guard	Gene Hickerson	Cleveland Browns	1958–1973	2007
Guard	Jerry Kramer	Green Bay Packers	1958–1968	2018
Guard	Howard Mudd	San Francisco 49ers	1964–1969	Not inducted
Guard	Howard Mudd	Chicago Bears	1969–1970	Not inducted
Center	Jim Ringo	Green Bay Packers	1953–1963	1981
Center	Jim Ringo	Philadelphia Eagles	1964–1967	1981
=== Defense ===
End	Doug Atkins	Cleveland Browns	1953–1954	1982
End	Doug Atkins	Chicago Bears	1955–1966	1982
End	Doug Atkins	New Orleans Saints	1967–1969	1982
End	Willie Davis	Cleveland Browns	1958–1959	1981
End	Willie Davis	Green Bay Packers	1960–1969	1981
End	David "Deacon" Jones	Los Angeles Rams	1961–1971	1980
End	David "Deacon" Jones	San Diego Chargers	1972–1973	1980
End	David "Deacon" Jones	Washington Redskins	1974	1980
Tackle	Alex Karras	Detroit Lions	1958–1962, 1964–1970	2020
Tackle	Bob Lilly	Dallas Cowboys	1961–1974	1980
Tackle	Merlin Olsen	Los Angeles Rams	1962–1976	1982
Linebacker	Dick Butkus	Chicago Bears	1965–1973	1979
Linebacker	Larry Morris	Los Angeles Rams	1955–1957	Not inducted
Linebacker	Larry Morris	Chicago Bears	1959–1965	Not inducted
Linebacker	Larry Morris	Atlanta Falcons	1966	Not inducted
Linebacker	Ray Nitschke	Green Bay Packers	1958–1972	1978
Linebacker	Tommy Nobis	Atlanta Falcons	1966–1976	Not inducted
Linebacker	Dave Robinson	Green Bay Packers	1963–1972	2013
Linebacker	Dave Robinson	Washington Redskins	1973–1974	2013
Cornerback	Herb Adderley	Green Bay Packers	1961–1969	1980
Cornerback	Herb Adderley	Dallas Cowboys	1970–1972	1980
Cornerback	Lem Barney	Detroit Lions	1967–1977	1992
Cornerback	Bobby Boyd	Baltimore Colts	1960–1968	Not inducted
Safety	Eddie Meador	Los Angeles Rams	1959–1970	Not inducted
Safety	Larry Wilson	St. Louis Cardinals	1960–1972	1978
Safety	Willie Wood	Green Bay Packers	1960–1971	1989
=== Special teams ===
Kicker	Jim Bakken	St. Louis Cardinals	1962–1978	Not inducted
Punter	Don Chandler	New York Giants	1956–1964	Not inducted
Punter	Don Chandler	Green Bay Packers	1965–1967	Not inducted
