= History of the NFL championship =

History of American football championships

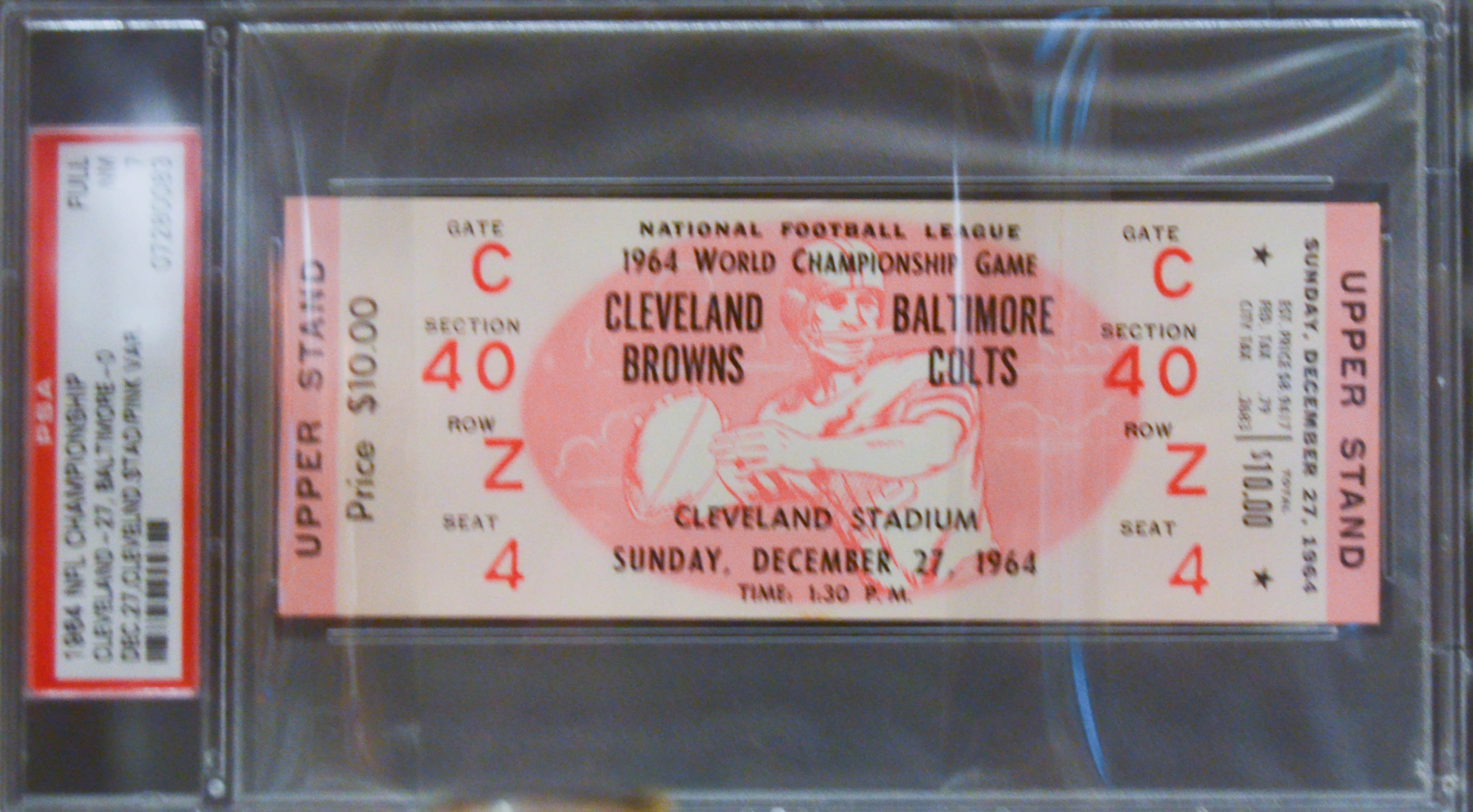
1964 NFL Championship ticket

The National Football League was founded in September of 1920 when representatives from 10 professional football teams met in Canton, Ohio. The league was initially established as the American Professional Football Association (APFA) but it was renamed the NFL in 1922.

There have been three eras of the NFL since its founding in 1920:

1) The League Standings era from 1920 to 1932

2) The NFL Championship Game era from 1933 to 1965

3) The Super Bowl era from 1966 to the present day

All championships awarded in each era count the same in the NFL record books.

The Green Bay Packers have won the most NFL championship titles with 13 (nine pre-Super Bowl era and four Super Bowls). The Chicago Bears have won the second most overall championships with 9 (eight pre-Super Bowl era and one Super Bowl) and the New York Giants have won the third most with 8 (four pre-Super Bowl era and four Super Bowls).

The rival All-America Football Conference (AAFC) and American Football League (AFL) were two other professional football leagues that have since merged with the NFL (the only two AAFC teams that currently exist, the Cleveland Browns and the San Francisco 49ers, joined the NFL in 1950). The AFL began play in 1960 and existed through the 1969 season and then merged with the NFL in 1970. The AAFC operated from 1946 to 1949 and then folded after that.

== 1920–1932: The League Standings era ==
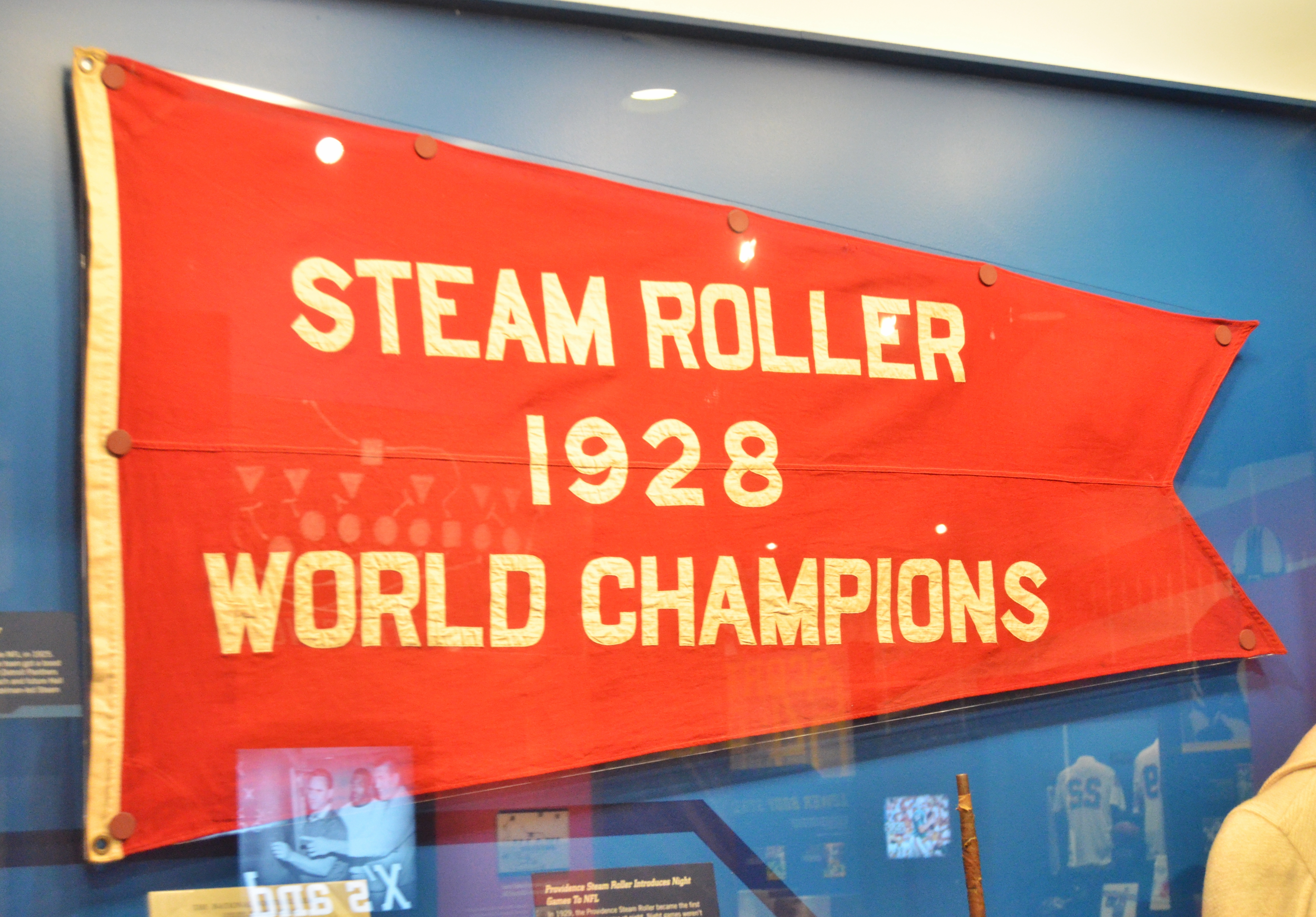
The 1928 Steam Rollers championship team pennant

At its inception in 1920, the NFL had no playoff system or championship game: the champion was the team with the best record during the season as determined by winning percentage, with ties excluded. This sometimes led to very unusual results, as teams played anywhere from six to twenty league games in a season, and not all teams played the same number of games or against league talent.

As a result, in the league's first six seasons, four league titles were disputed and had to be resolved by the league's executive committee. In 1920, the Akron Pros went undefeated, tying three games, but two teams that had won more games (and who had both tied Akron), the Buffalo All-Americans and Decatur Staleys, petitioned the league for a share of the title; both teams' petitions were denied, and Akron was awarded the first (and only) Brunswick-Balke Collender Cup. According to modern tie-breaking rules, Akron and Buffalo would be co-champions. Akron and Buffalo both awarded their team members with gold medallions.

The next was in the 1921 NFL season, between the same All-Americans and Staleys (with the latter now being based in Chicago). Buffalo had insisted that the last matchup between the two was an exhibition game not to be counted toward the standings, however, Chicago owner George Halas and league management insisted the game be counted in its standings (the league, at the time, did not recognize exhibition matches). The result was that although the two teams were effectively tied in the standings, the disputed game, having been played later, was given more weight and thus ended up being considered a de facto championship game. Chicago also had one fewer tie game.

A nearly identical situation recurred in 1924, when Chicago tried the same tactic of a final game against the Cleveland Bulldogs, but the league ruled the opposite and declared the last game "post-season", giving the Cleveland Bulldogs (formerly the Cleveland Indians) their first and only championship.

The fourth and final disputed title was the 1925 NFL Championship controversy between the Pottsville Maroons and the Chicago Cardinals. The Maroons had been controversially suspended by the league at the end of the 1925 NFL season for an unauthorized game against a non-NFL team, allowing the Cardinals to throw together two fairly easy matches (one against a team consisting partly of high school players, also against league rules) to pass Pottsville in the standings. The league awarded the Cardinals the title, one of only two in the team's history, but the Cardinals declined the offer and the championship was vacated.

Only in 1933, when the Bidwill family (which still owns the Cardinals) bought the team, did the Cardinals reverse their decision and claim the title as their own, a decision that continues to be disputed, with the Bidwills opposing any change in the record and the two current Pennsylvania teams in favor. The league recognized the Bidwills' claim to the title and has taken no other action on the issue, although a self-made championship trophy from the Maroons sits in the Pro Football Hall of Fame. Ironically, it was Pottsville's win in that game against the Notre Dame All-Stars that gave professional football legitimacy over college football.

Part of the controversy over these older championships stems from the criteria the league used to determine its champion. The league used a variation of win percentage as its criterion, in which the number of wins is divided by the sum of wins and losses, and ties were excluded. The league began considering ties in its standings in 1972, counting them as half a win and half a loss, but this was not applied retroactively. Had it been, it would have changed the outcome of four 1920–1931 championships: the Buffalo All-Americans would have tied the Akron Pros for the 1920 title, the Duluth Kelleys would have tied the Cleveland Bulldogs for the 1924 title, the Pottsville Maroons would have won in 1925, and the New York Giants would have won in 1930.

Had win–loss differential (the standard method in baseball) been used, the Decatur Staleys would have won the 1920 title by virtue of being one game ahead of Buffalo, and the 1924 title would have been won by the Frankford Yellow Jackets, who were four games ahead of actual champion Cleveland in the standings by that measure.

At the end of the 1932 season, the Chicago Bears and the Portsmouth Spartans were tied with the best winning percentage at .857, with the Spartans record of 6–1–4 and the Bears record of 6–1–6 taken to be six wins, one loss, while the Green Bay Packers finished 10–3–1. Had pure win–loss differential or the current (post-1972) system of counting ties as half a win, half a loss been in place in 1932, the Packers' record of 10–3–1 (.750, +7) would have won them a fourth consecutive championship, ahead of the Spartans' 6–1–4 (.727, +5) and the Bears' 6–1–6 (.692, +5).

To determine the champion, the league, reportedly at the behest of George Preston Marshall, voted to hold the first official playoff game in Chicago at Wrigley Field. Because of severe winter conditions before the game, and fear of low turnout, the game was held indoors at Chicago Stadium which forced some temporary rule changes. The game was played on a modified 80-yard dirt field, and Chicago won 9–0, winning the league championship. Since the game counted in the standings, Portsmouth finished third behind Green Bay.

A number of new rule changes were instituted, many inspired by the 1932 indoor championship game: the goal posts were moved forward to the goal line, every play started from between the hash marks, and forward passes could originate from anywhere behind the line of scrimmage (instead of five yards behind).

The playoff game proved so popular that the league reorganized into two divisions for the 1933 season, with the winners advancing to a scheduled championship game.

== 1933–1965: The NFL Championship Game era ==
Starting in 1933, the NFL decided its champion through a single postseason playoff game, called the NFL Championship Game. During this period, the league divided its teams into two groups, through 1949 as divisions and from 1950 onward as conferences.

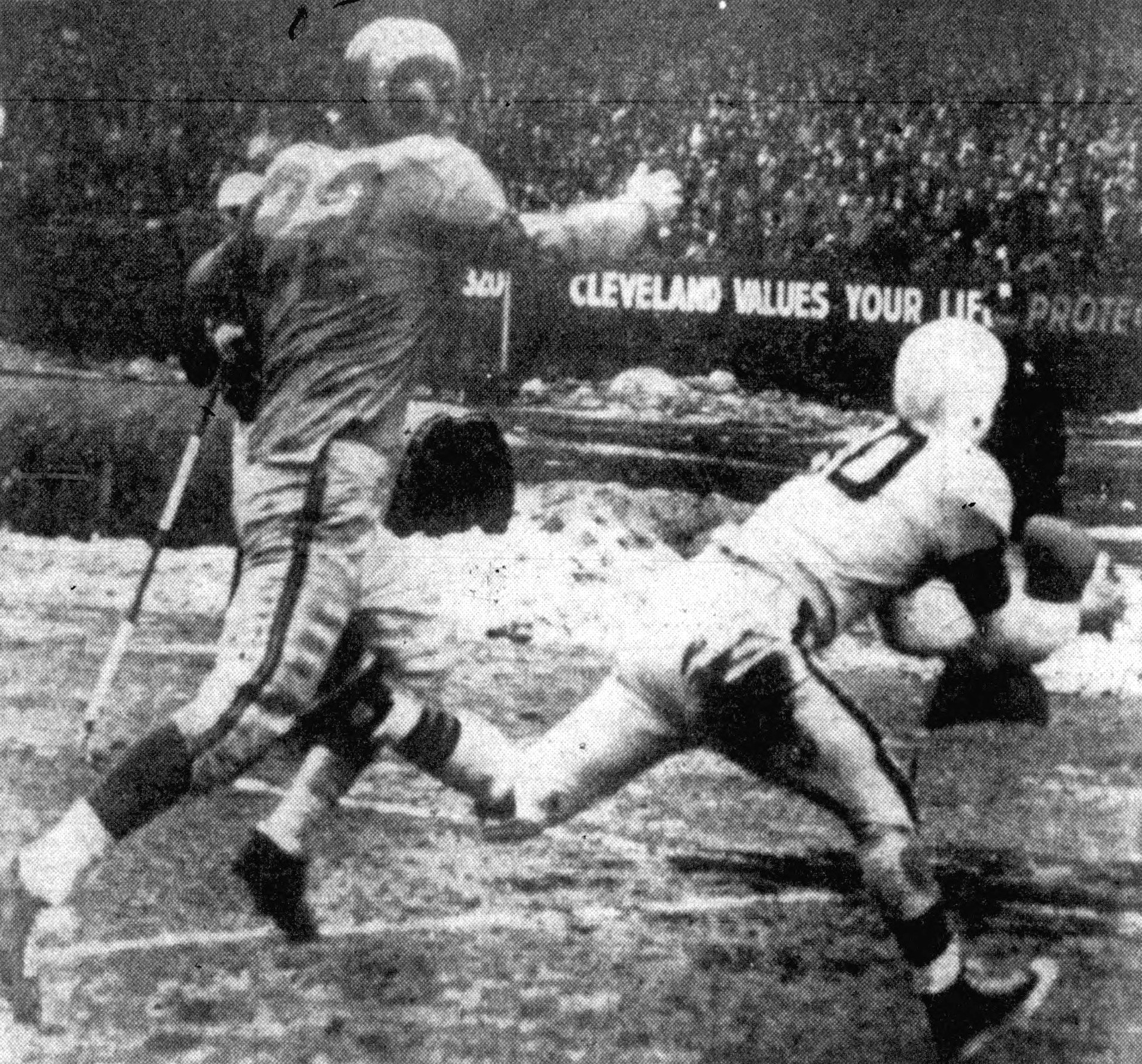
Rex Bumgardner making a touchdown reception in the 1950 NFL Championship

- Divisions (1933–1949): Eastern and Western
- Conferences (1950–1952): American and National
- Conferences (1953–1966): Eastern and Western
- Conferences and Divisions (1967–1969): Eastern (Capitol and Century) and Western (Central and Coastal)

Home field for the 1933 title game was determined by the won-lost percentage in use at the time; the Western Division champion Chicago Bears (10–2–1, .833), having a better record than the Eastern Division champion New York Giants (11–3–0, .786), won the right to host the first title playoff. Thereafter, from 1934 onward, the divisions alternated the site of the playoff, with the East/American hosting in even years and the West/National in odd years. If there was a tie for first place within the conference, an extra playoff game decided who would go to the NFL Championship Game, with a coin toss deciding where the game would be played. (This occurred nine times in these 34 seasons: 1941, 1943, 1947, 1950 (both conferences), 1952, 1957, 1958, and 1965.)

This last occurred during the 1965 season, when the Green Bay Packers and Baltimore Colts tied for first place in the Western Conference at 10–3–1. Green Bay had won both its games with Baltimore during the regular season, but because no tie-breaker system was in place, a conference playoff game was held on December 26 (what was scheduled to be an off-week between the end of the regular schedule and the NFL Championship Game). The Cleveland Browns, the Eastern champion at 11–3–0, did not play that week. The championship game was then held on its originally scheduled date, January 2, 1966—the first time the NFL champion was crowned in January. Green Bay won both post-season games at home, beating the injury-riddled Colts (with third-string QB Tom Matte) in overtime by a controversial field goal, and taking the title 23–12 on a very muddy field (in what turned out to be Jim Brown's final NFL game).

For the 1960 through 1969 seasons, the NFL staged an additional postseason game called the "Playoff Bowl" (aka the "Bert Bell Benefit Bowl" or the "Runner-up Bowl"). These games matched the second-place teams from the two conferences; the CBS television network advertised them as "playoff games for third place in the NFL." All ten of these consolation games were played in the Orange Bowl in Miami in January, the week after the NFL championship game. The NFL now classifies these contests as exhibition games and does not include the records, participants, or results in the official league playoff statistics. The Playoff Bowl was discontinued after the AFL–NFL merger; the final edition was played in January 1970.

Starting with the 1934 game the winning team received the Ed Thorp Memorial Trophy. The trophy was named after Ed Thorp, a noted referee, rules expert, and sporting goods dealer. Thorp died in 1934 and a large, traveling trophy was made that year, passed along from champion to champion each season with each championship team's name inscribed on it. Teams would also receive a replica trophy. The trophy was last awarded to the Minnesota Vikings in 1969.

Late in the 1940 season, NFL President Carl Storck announced that sudden death periods would be authorized for any playoff game needed to decide either division title. It was emphasized that this did not apply to the final championship game, which would crown co-champions in the event of a tie. While a shared championship was deemed an acceptable solution, it must have become obvious that an elimination game leading to the championship must necessarily produce a winner. Commissioner Elmer Layden approved a similar arrangement for the 1941 season, with the same limitation. A coin toss would decide possession of the Ed Thorp trophy that accompanied the league title should the championship game result in a tie.

Sudden death overtime was finally approved for the NFL championship game in 1946. The first playoff game requiring overtime was the 1958 NFL Championship Game.

The 1955 and 1960 NFL championship games were played on Monday afternoons, Christmas having fallen on a Sunday in those years.

== 1966–1969: The Super Bowl era: Pre-merger with the AFL ==
In 1966, the success of the rival AFL, the spectre of the NFL's losing more stars to the AFL, and concern over a costly "bidding war" for players precipitated by the NFL's Giants' signing of Pete Gogolak, who was under contract to the AFL's Buffalo Bills, led the two leagues to discuss a merger. Pivotal to this was approval by Congress of a law (PL 89-800) that would waive jeopardy to anti-trust statutes for the merged leagues. The major point of the testimony given by the leagues to obtain the law was that if the merger were permitted, "Professional football operations will be preserved in the 23 cities and 25 stadiums where such operations are presently being conducted." The merger was announced on June 8, 1966, and became fully effective in 1970.

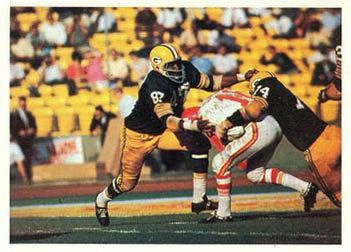
The Packers defeated the Chiefs in the first AFL–NFL Championship Game (Super Bowl I)

After expanding to enfranchise the New Orleans Saints in 1967, the NFL split its 16 teams into two conferences with two divisions each: the Capitol and Century Divisions in the Eastern Conference, and the Coastal and Central Divisions in the Western Conference. The playoff format was expanded from a single championship game to a four-team tournament, with the four divisional champions participating. The two division winners in each conference met in the "Conference Championships", with the winners advancing to the NFL Championship Game. Again, the home team for each playoff game was determined by a yearly divisional or conference rotation.

Following the NFL and AFL Championship Games for the 1966 through 1969 seasons, the NFL champion played the AFL champion in Super Bowls I through IV, the only true inter-league championship games in the history of professional football. The first two of these games were known as the AFL-NFL Championship Game, as the title Super Bowl was not chosen until 1968. Thus the third AFL-NFL matchup was dubbed "Super Bowl III" and the first two matches were retronamed as Super Bowls I and II. The first two games were convincingly won by the NFL's Packers, the last two by the AFL's New York Jets and Kansas City Chiefs, leaving the leagues even at 2–2 in "Championship" competition when they subsequently merged.

== 1970–present: The Super Bowl era: Post-merger with the AFL to present day ==
After the 1969 season and Super Bowl IV, the AFL and NFL fully merged and underwent a re-alignment for the 1970 season. Three of the pre-merger NFL teams were transferred to the AFC (Browns, Colts, and Steelers) to level the conferences (AFC and NFC) at 13 teams each; each conference split into three divisions.

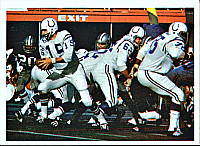
The Colts beat the Cowboys in the first Super Bowl after the AFL–NFL merger (Super Bowl V)

With only six division winners in the newly merged league, the NFL designed an eight-team playoff tournament, with four clubs from each conference qualifying. Along with the three division winners in each conference, two wild card teams (one from each conference), the second-place finishers with the best records in each conference, were added to the tournament. The first round was named the "Divisional Playoffs", the winners advancing to the "Conference Championships" (AFC & NFC). Two weeks later, the AFC and NFC champions met in the Super Bowl, now the league's championship game. Thus, Super Bowl V in January 1971 was the first Super Bowl played for the NFL title.

With the introduction of the wild card, a rule was instituted to prohibit two teams from the same division (champion and wild card) from meeting in the first-round (Divisional Playoffs). This rule would remain in effect through the 1989 season. More significantly, the home teams in the playoffs were still decided by a yearly divisional rotation, not on regular-season records (excluding the wild-card teams, who would always play on the road). This lack of "home-field advantage" was most evident in the 1972 playoffs, when the undefeated Miami Dolphins played the AFC Championship Game at Three Rivers Stadium in Pittsburgh against the Steelers, who were undefeated at home during the regular season, but had three losses on the road.

Beginning in 1972, tie games were included in the computing of each team's winning percentage. Each tie was then counted as half of a win and half of a loss, rather than being omitted from the computation. Previously, the NFL disregarded any tie games played when they computed the standings, basing it on winning percentage with any ties thrown out and ignored. Overtime games were not played during the regular season until 1974.

=== The institution of "home-field advantage" ===
In 1975, the league modified its 1970 playoff format by instituting a seeding system. The surviving clubs with the higher seeds were made the home teams for each playoff round. The three division champions in each conference were seeded first through third based on their regular-season records, with the wild-card team in each conference as the fourth seed.

Teams that earned the top seed became known as clinching "home-field advantage" throughout the playoffs, since they played all of their playoff games at their home stadium (except for the Super Bowl, played at a neutral site).

However, the league continued to prohibit meetings between teams from the same division in the Divisional Playoffs. Thus, there would be times when the pairing in that round would pit the first seed versus the third, and the second versus the fourth.

=== Further playoff expansion ===
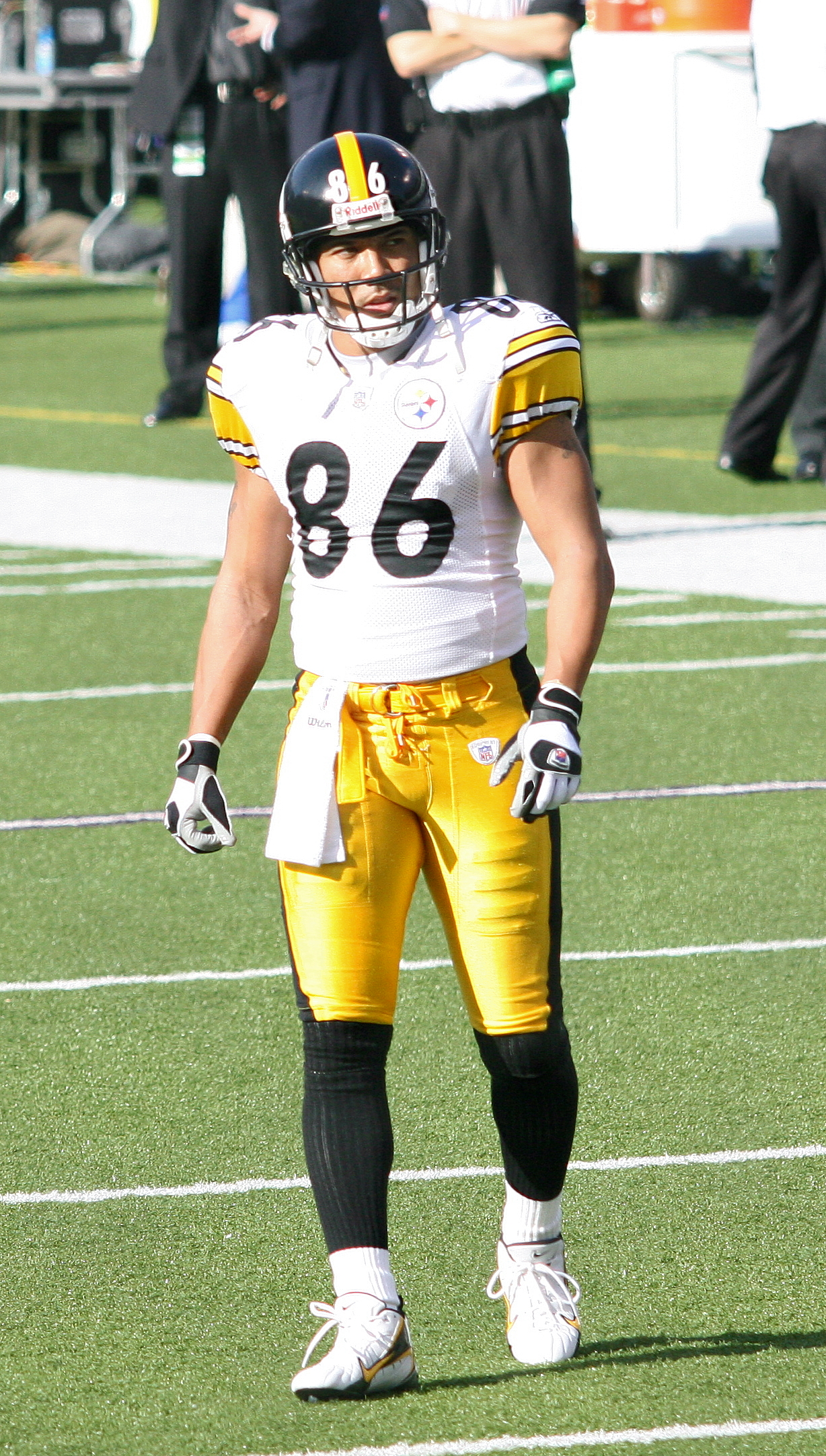
In Super Bowl XL, the Pittsburgh Steelers became the first 6-seeded team to win the Super Bowl. Pictured is Hines Ward, the game's MVP

The league expanded the playoffs to 10 teams in 1978, adding a second wild-card team (a fifth seed) from each conference. The two wild-card teams from each conference (the fourth and fifth seeds) played each other in the first round, called the "Wild Card Playoffs." The division winners (the first three seeds) would then receive a bye to automatically advance to the Divisional Playoffs, which became the second round of the playoffs. In the divisional round, much like the 1970 playoff format, teams from the same division were still prohibited from playing each other, regardless of seeding. Under the 1978 format, teams from the same division could meet only in the wild-card round or the conference championship. Thus, as before, a divisional champion could only play a divisional foe in the conference championship game.

A players' strike shortened the 1982 season to nine games. The league used a special 16-team playoff tournament for that year. The top eight teams from each conference qualified (ignoring the divisional races—there were no division standings, and in some cases, two teams from the same division did not play each other at all that season). The playoffs reverted to the 1978 format in the following year.

In 1990, the NFL expanded the playoffs to twelve teams by adding a third wild-card team (a sixth seed) from each conference. The restrictions on intra-division playoff games during the Divisional Playoffs were removed. However, only the top two division winners in each conference (the 1 and 2 seeds) received byes and automatically advanced to the Divisional Playoffs as host teams. The 3 seed, the division winner with the worst regular-season record in each conference, would then host the 6 seed in the Wild Card Playoffs.

In each conference, the matchup between the 3 and 6 seeds in the wild-card round dictated where the wild-card round winners traveled to for the divisional round:

- If the 3-seeded team won, they traveled to the 2-seeded team while the winner of the 4 vs. 5 matchup traveled to the 1-seeded team.
- If the 6-seeded team won, they traveled to the 1-seeded team while the winner of the 4 vs. 5 matchup traveled to the 2-seeded team.

In 2002, the NFL realigned into eight divisions, four per conference, to accommodate a 32nd team, the Houston Texans. The playoffs remained a 12-team tournament, with four division winners (the 1, 2, 3, and 4 seeds) and two wild cards (the 5 and 6 seeds) from each conference advancing to the playoffs. Again, only the top two division winners in each conference would automatically advance to the Divisional Playoffs, while everybody else had to play in the Wild Card round. Furthermore, the league still maintains the names "Wild Card Playoffs", "Divisional Playoffs", and "Conference Championships" for the first, second, and third rounds of the playoffs, respectively.

Playoff expansion was initially tabled by the league owners in 2013. However, beginning with the 2020 season, the NFL did expand the playoffs to 14 teams. With the new format, seven teams per conference made the playoffs, with only the top seed in each conference receiving a bye.

== Champions per season ==
Below is a list of NFL football champions per season as recognized by the Pro Football Hall of Fame.

=== APFA/NFL League Standing champions (1920–1932) ===
For the first thirteen seasons, the APFA/NFL did not hold a championship game, except in 1932, when a playoff game was held. Played indoors on a reduced-size field in order to break a tie in the standings, it was the precursor to the championship game (though the losing team finished in third place in the final standings). For the seasons from 1920–1971, the NFL did not include tie games in the winning percentage; they were omitted from the calculation.

Season	League Name	Team	Win	Loss	Tie	Pct.
1920	APFA	Akron Pros (1)	8	0	3	1.000
1921	APFA	Chicago Staleys (1)	9	1	1	.900
1922	NFL	Canton Bulldogs (1)	10	0	2	1.000
1923	NFL	Canton Bulldogs (2)	11	0	1	1.000
1924	NFL	Cleveland Bulldogs (1)	7	1	1	.875
1925	NFL	Chicago Cardinals (1)	11	2	1	.846
1926	NFL	Frankford Yellow Jackets (1)	14	1	2	.933
1927	NFL	New York Giants (1)	11	1	1	.917
1928	NFL	Providence Steam Roller (1)	8	1	2	.889
1929	NFL	Green Bay Packers (1)	12	0	1	1.000
1930	NFL	Green Bay Packers (2)	10	3	1	.769
1931	NFL	Green Bay Packers (3)	12	2	0	.857
1932	NFL	Chicago Bears (2)	7	1	6	.875

=== NFL Championship Game (1933–1965) ===
Season	League	Winning team	Score	Losing team	Venue	Attendance
1933	NFL	Chicago Bears (3)	23–21	New York Giants	Wrigley Field	26,000
1934	NFL	New York Giants (2)	30–13	Chicago Bears	Polo Grounds	35,059
1935	NFL	Detroit Lions (1)	26–7	New York Giants	University of Detroit Stadium	15,000
1936	NFL	Green Bay Packers (4)	21–6	Boston Redskins	Polo Grounds	29,545
1937	NFL	Washington Redskins (1)	28–21	Chicago Bears	Wrigley Field	15,870
1938	NFL	New York Giants (3)	23–17	Green Bay Packers	Polo Grounds	48,120
1939	NFL	Green Bay Packers (5)	27–0	New York Giants	Dairy Bowl	32,279
1940	NFL	Chicago Bears (4)	73–0	Washington Redskins	Griffith Stadium	36,034
1941	NFL	Chicago Bears (5)	37–9	New York Giants	Wrigley Field	13,341
1942	NFL	Washington Redskins (2)	14–6	Chicago Bears	Griffith Stadium	36,006
1943	NFL	Chicago Bears (6)	41–21	Washington Redskins	Wrigley Field	34,320
1944	NFL	Green Bay Packers (6)	14–7	New York Giants	Polo Grounds	46,016
1945	NFL	Cleveland Rams (1)	15–14	Washington Redskins	Cleveland Municipal Stadium	32,178
1946	NFL	Chicago Bears (7)	24–14	New York Giants	Polo Grounds	58,346
1947	NFL	Chicago Cardinals (2)	28–21	Philadelphia Eagles	Comiskey Park	30,759
1948	NFL	Philadelphia Eagles (1)	7–0	Chicago Cardinals	Shibe Park	36,309
1949	NFL	Philadelphia Eagles (2)	14–0	Los Angeles Rams	Los Angeles Memorial Coliseum	27,980
1950	NFL	Cleveland Browns (1)	30–28	Los Angeles Rams	Cleveland Municipal Stadium	29,751
1951	NFL	Los Angeles Rams (2)	24–17	Cleveland Browns	Los Angeles Memorial Coliseum	57,522
1952	NFL	Detroit Lions (2)	17–7	Cleveland Browns	Cleveland Municipal Stadium	50,934
1953	NFL	Detroit Lions (3)	17–16	Cleveland Browns	Briggs Stadium	54,577
1954	NFL	Cleveland Browns (2)	56–10	Detroit Lions	Cleveland Municipal Stadium	43,827
1955	NFL	Cleveland Browns (3)	38–14	Los Angeles Rams	Los Angeles Memorial Coliseum	85,693
1956	NFL	New York Giants (4)	47–7	Chicago Bears	Yankee Stadium	56,836
1957	NFL	Detroit Lions (4)	59–14	Cleveland Browns	Briggs Stadium	55,263
1958	NFL	Baltimore Colts (1)	23–17 (OT)	New York Giants	Yankee Stadium	64,185
1959	NFL	Baltimore Colts (2)	31–16	New York Giants	Memorial Stadium	57,545
1960	NFL	Philadelphia Eagles (3)	17–13	Green Bay Packers	Franklin Field	67,325
1961	NFL	Green Bay Packers (7)	37–0	New York Giants	"New" City Stadium	39,029
1962	NFL	Green Bay Packers (8)	16–7	New York Giants	Yankee Stadium	64,892
1963	NFL	Chicago Bears (8)	14–10	New York Giants	Wrigley Field	45,801
1964	NFL	Cleveland Browns (4)	27–0	Baltimore Colts	Cleveland Municipal Stadium	79,544
1965	NFL	Green Bay Packers (9)	23–12	Cleveland Browns	Lambeau Field	50,777

=== Super Bowl championship (1966–present) ===
Season	League	Game	Winning team	Score	Losing team	Venue	Attendance
1966	NFL; AFL	I	Green Bay Packers (10)	35–10	Kansas City Chiefs	Los Angeles Memorial Coliseum	61,946
1967	NFL; AFL	II	Green Bay Packers (11)	33–14	Oakland Raiders	Miami Orange Bowl	75,546
1968	NFL; AFL	III	New York Jets (1)	16–7	Baltimore Colts	Miami Orange Bowl	75,389
1969	NFL; AFL	IV	Kansas City Chiefs (1)	23–7	Minnesota Vikings	Tulane Stadium	80,562
1970	NFL	V	Baltimore Colts (3)	16–13	Dallas Cowboys	Miami Orange Bowl	79,204
1971	NFL	VI	Dallas Cowboys (1)	24–3	Miami Dolphins	Tulane Stadium	81,023
1972	NFL	VII	Miami Dolphins (1)	14–7	Washington Redskins	Los Angeles Memorial Coliseum	90,182
1973	NFL	VIII	Miami Dolphins (2)	24–7	Minnesota Vikings	Rice Stadium	71,882
1974	NFL	IX	Pittsburgh Steelers (1)	16–6	Minnesota Vikings	Tulane Stadium	80,997
1975	NFL	X	Pittsburgh Steelers (2)	21–17	Dallas Cowboys	Miami Orange Bowl	80,187
1976	NFL	XI	Oakland Raiders (1)	32–14	Minnesota Vikings	Rose Bowl	103,438
1977	NFL	XII	Dallas Cowboys (2)	27–10	Denver Broncos	Louisiana Superdome	76,400
1978	NFL	XIII	Pittsburgh Steelers (3)	35–31	Dallas Cowboys	Miami Orange Bowl	79,484
1979	NFL	XIV	Pittsburgh Steelers (4)	31–19	Los Angeles Rams	Rose Bowl	103,985
1980	NFL	XV	Oakland Raiders (2)	27–10	Philadelphia Eagles	Louisiana Superdome	76,135
1981	NFL	XVI	San Francisco 49ers (1)	26–21	Cincinnati Bengals	Pontiac Silverdome	81,270
1982	NFL	XVII	Washington Redskins (3)	27–17	Miami Dolphins	Rose Bowl	103,667
1983	NFL	XVIII	Los Angeles Raiders (3)	38–9	Washington Redskins	Tampa Stadium	72,920
1984	NFL	XIX	San Francisco 49ers (2)	38–16	Miami Dolphins	Stanford Stadium	84,059
1985	NFL	XX	Chicago Bears (9)	46–10	New England Patriots	Louisiana Superdome	73,818
1986	NFL	XXI	New York Giants (5)	39–20	Denver Broncos	Rose Bowl	101,063
1987	NFL	XXII	Washington Redskins (4)	42–10	Denver Broncos	Jack Murphy Stadium	73,302
1988	NFL	XXIII	San Francisco 49ers (3)	20–16	Cincinnati Bengals	Joe Robbie Stadium	75,129
1989	NFL	XXIV	San Francisco 49ers (4)	55–10	Denver Broncos	Louisiana Superdome	72,919
1990	NFL	XXV	New York Giants (6)	20–19	Buffalo Bills	Tampa Stadium	73,813
1991	NFL	XXVI	Washington Redskins (5)	37–24	Buffalo Bills	Hubert H. Humphrey Metrodome	63,130
1992	NFL	XXVII	Dallas Cowboys (3)	52–17	Buffalo Bills	Rose Bowl	98,374
1993	NFL	XXVIII	Dallas Cowboys (4)	30–13	Buffalo Bills	Georgia Dome	72,817
1994	NFL	XXIX	San Francisco 49ers (5)	49–26	San Diego Chargers	Joe Robbie Stadium	74,107
1995	NFL	XXX	Dallas Cowboys (5)	27–17	Pittsburgh Steelers	Sun Devil Stadium	76,347
1996	NFL	XXXI	Green Bay Packers (12)	35–21	New England Patriots	Louisiana Superdome	72,301
1997	NFL	XXXII	Denver Broncos (1)	31–24	Green Bay Packers	Qualcomm Stadium	68,912
1998	NFL	XXXIII	Denver Broncos (2)	34–19	Atlanta Falcons	Pro Player Stadium	74,803
1999	NFL	XXXIV	St. Louis Rams (3)	23–16	Tennessee Titans	Georgia Dome	72,625
2000	NFL	XXXV	Baltimore Ravens (1)	34–7	New York Giants	Raymond James Stadium	71,921
2001	NFL	XXXVI	New England Patriots (1)	20–17	St. Louis Rams	Louisiana Superdome	72,922
2002	NFL	XXXVII	Tampa Bay Buccaneers (1)	48–21	Oakland Raiders	Qualcomm Stadium	67,603
2003	NFL	XXXVIII	New England Patriots (2)	32–29	Carolina Panthers	Reliant Stadium	71,525
2004	NFL	XXXIX	New England Patriots (3)	24–21	Philadelphia Eagles	Alltel Stadium	78,125
2005	NFL	XL	Pittsburgh Steelers (5)	21–10	Seattle Seahawks	Ford Field	68,206
2006	NFL	XLI	Indianapolis Colts (4)	29–17	Chicago Bears	Dolphin Stadium	74,512
2007	NFL	XLII	New York Giants (7)	17–14	New England Patriots	University of Phoenix Stadium	71,101
2008	NFL	XLIII	Pittsburgh Steelers (6)	27–23	Arizona Cardinals	Raymond James Stadium	70,774
2009	NFL	XLIV	New Orleans Saints (1)	31–17	Indianapolis Colts	Sun Life Stadium	74,059
2010	NFL	XLV	Green Bay Packers (13)	31–25	Pittsburgh Steelers	Cowboys Stadium	103,219
2011	NFL	XLVI	New York Giants (8)	21–17	New England Patriots	Lucas Oil Stadium	68,658
2012	NFL	XLVII	Baltimore Ravens (2)	34–31	San Francisco 49ers	Mercedes-Benz Superdome	71,024
2013	NFL	XLVIII	Seattle Seahawks (1)	43–8	Denver Broncos	MetLife Stadium	82,529
2014	NFL	XLIX	New England Patriots (4)	28–24	Seattle Seahawks	University of Phoenix Stadium	70,288
2015	NFL	50	Denver Broncos (3)	24–10	Carolina Panthers	Levi's Stadium	71,088
2016	NFL	LI	New England Patriots (5)	34–28 (OT)	Atlanta Falcons	NRG Stadium	70,807
2017	NFL	LII	Philadelphia Eagles (4)	41–33	New England Patriots	U.S. Bank Stadium	67,612
2018	NFL	LIII	New England Patriots (6)	13–3	Los Angeles Rams	Mercedes-Benz Stadium	73,019
2019	NFL	LIV	Kansas City Chiefs (2)	31–20	San Francisco 49ers	Hard Rock Stadium	62,417
2020	NFL	LV	Tampa Bay Buccaneers (2)	31–9	Kansas City Chiefs	Raymond James Stadium	25,000
2021	NFL	LVI	Los Angeles Rams (4)	23–20	Cincinnati Bengals	SoFi Stadium	70,048
2022	NFL	LVII	Kansas City Chiefs (3)	38–35	Philadelphia Eagles	State Farm Stadium	67,827
2023	NFL	LVIII	Kansas City Chiefs (4)	25–22 (OT)	San Francisco 49ers	Allegiant Stadium	61,629
2024	NFL	LIX	Philadelphia Eagles (5)	40–22	Kansas City Chiefs	Caesars Superdome	65,719
2025	NFL	LX	Seattle Seahawks (2)	29–13	New England Patriots	Levi's Stadium	70,823

== NFL championships by franchise ==
Former franchise

Franchise	No.	Seasons
Green Bay Packers	13	1929, 1930, 1931, 1936, 1939, 1944, 1961, 1962, 1965, 1966, 1967, 1996, 2010
Chicago Bears	9	1921, 1932, 1933, 1940, 1941, 1943, 1946, 1963, 1985
New York Giants	8	1927, 1934, 1938, 1956, 1986, 1990, 2007, 2011
Boston / New England Patriots	6	2001, 2003, 2004, 2014, 2016, 2018
Pittsburgh Steelers	6	1974, 1975, 1978, 1979, 2005, 2008
Boston / Washington Redskins / Commanders	5	1937, 1942, 1982, 1987, 1991
Philadelphia Eagles	5	1948, 1949, 1960, 2017, 2024
Dallas Cowboys	5	1971, 1977, 1992, 1993, 1995
San Francisco 49ers	5	1981, 1984, 1988, 1989, 1994
Cleveland / St. Louis / Los Angeles Rams	4	1945, 1951, 1999, 2021
Cleveland Browns	4	1950, 1954, 1955, 1964
Baltimore / Indianapolis Colts	4	1958, 1959, 1970, 2006
Dallas Texans / Kansas City Chiefs	4	1969, 2019, 2022, 2023
Detroit Lions	4	1935, 1952, 1953, 1957
Denver Broncos	3	1997, 1998, 2015
Oakland / Los Angeles / Las Vegas Raiders	3	1976, 1980, 1983
Miami Dolphins	2	1972, 1973
Chicago / St. Louis / Phoenix / Arizona Cardinals	2	1925, 1947
Seattle Seahawks	2	2013, 2025
Baltimore Ravens	2	2000, 2012
Tampa Bay Buccaneers	2	2002, 2020
Canton Bulldogs	2	1922, 1923
New Orleans Saints	1	2009
New York Jets	1	1968
Frankford Yellow Jackets	1	1926
Akron Pros	1	1920
Cleveland Bulldogs	1	1924
Providence Steam Rollers	1	1928

== List of various league/world championship game systems ==
Current NFL championship system	Inter-league/world championship system	Defunct league championship system

League	Official name	Common name	First year	Last year	Trophy name
NFL	NFL champion (No championship game played)	NFL Champion	1920	1932	Brunswick-Balke Collender Cup, 1920; None, 1921–32
NFL	NFL Championship Game	NFL Championship	1933	1969	Ed Thorp Memorial Trophy
AFL	AFL Championship Game	AFL Championship	1960	1969	AFL Trophy
AFL; NFL	AFL-NFL World Championship Game	World Championship of Pro Football; AFL-NFL World Championship Game; Super Bowl	1966	1969	Vince Lombardi Trophy
NFL	Super Bowl	Super Bowl	1970	Present	Vince Lombardi Trophy

== Undefeated regular seasons and "perfect seasons" in professional football ==
Perfect Season†

League	Season	Franchise	Regular season					Postseason result(s)	Recognition
League	Season	Franchise	Wins	Losses	Ties	Pct.	Finish	Postseason result(s)	Recognition
NFL	1920	Akron Pros*	8	0	3	0.864	1st NFL	No Post-Season – Championship by league vote	NFL: No; HOF: No
NFL	1922	Canton Bulldogs*	10	0	2	0.917	1st NFL	No Post-Season – Championship by standings	NFL: No; HOF: No
NFL	1923	Canton Bulldogs*	11	0	1	0.958	1st NFL	No Post-Season – Championship by standings	NFL: No; HOF: No
NFL	1929	Green Bay Packers*	12	0	1	0.962	1st NFL	No Post-Season – Championship by standings	NFL: No; HOF: No
NFL	1934	Chicago Bears	13	0	0	1.000	1st NFL West	Lost NFL Championship (Giants) (13–30)	NFL: Yes; HOF: Yes
NFL	1942	Chicago Bears	11	0	0	1.000	1st NFL West	Lost NFL Championship (Redskins) (6–14)	NFL: Yes; HOF: Yes
AAFC	1948†	Cleveland Browns	14	0	0	1.000	1st AAFC West	Won AAFC championship (Bills) (49–7)	NFL: Yes; HOF: Yes
NFL	1972†	Miami Dolphins	14	0	0	1.000	1st AFC East	Won Divisional Playoffs (Browns) (20–14); Won Conference Championship (Steelers) (21–17); Won Super Bowl VII (Redskins) (14–7)	NFL: Yes; HOF: Yes
NFL	2007	New England Patriots	16	0	0	1.000	1st AFC East	Won Divisional Playoffs (Jaguars) (31–20); Won Conference Championship (Chargers) (21–12); Lost Super Bowl XLII (Giants) (14–17)	NFL: Yes; HOF: Yes

(*) Since the NFL did not count tied games in league standings until 1972, these seasons were considered to be "perfect" at the time they finished; further, these teams had no incentive to avoid tied games in order to maintain a "perfect" season. Thus, the accuracy of calling these seasons "imperfect" is still disputed.

== See also ==
- NFC Championship Game
- AFC Championship Game
- AAFC Championship
- AFL champion
- List of players who have won the most NFL championships
