= 1965 NFL playoffs =

American football tournament

- Dates: December 26, 1965-January 2, 1966
- Season: 1965
- Teams: 3
- Games played: 2
- NFL Championship Game site: Lambeau Field; Green Bay, Wisconsin
- Defending champions: Cleveland Browns
- Champion: Green Bay Packers (9th title)
- Runner-up: Cleveland Browns
- Conference runners-up: Baltimore Colts
NFL playoffs
← 1958	1967 →

The 1965 NFL playoffs determined the champion of the National Football League in professional American football for its 1965 season. Although a single championship game between conference winners was the current format for the league, a tie in the Western Conference standings between the Green Bay Packers and Baltimore Colts necessitated a rare tiebreaker playoff, the first in the league in seven years and the first in the Western Conference since 1957. A coin flip decided the home team. The teams had played twice during the regular season and Green Bay had won both: 20–17 in Milwaukee on September 26, and 42–27 in Baltimore on December 12.

Both teams were hampered on offense without their starting quarterbacks. Colts Johnny Unitas and Gary Cuozzo were both sidelined with injuries, and newly signed replacements Ed Brown and George Haffner were ruled ineligible by the league owners, so fifth-year running back Tom Matte, a quarterback in college at Ohio State, was thrust into service behind center. Defensive back Bobby Boyd, a one-time Oklahoma quarterback, assumed the back-up role. Packers QB Bart Starr was injured (ribs) on the first play, so veteran Zeke Bratkowski played the rest of the game, backed up by halfback Paul Hornung and safety Willie Wood. Tied at 10 points at the end of regulation, the game went into overtime for over 13 minutes. At the time, it was the longest game in NFL history. Green Bay kicker Don Chandler made a controversial field goal late in regulation (22 yards) to tie the game at ten. He then booted the winning 25-yarder in overtime.

Although the championship game was played in 1966 on January 2, it is recognized as part of the 1965 NFL season. It was the latest date for an NFL Championship Game to that point, and the first time in league history that the game was held after all of the college bowl games.

The Playoff Bowl (a consolation game between the conference runners-up) for the 1965 season took place in Miami on January 9, 1966, the Sunday following the NFL championship game. With Matte at quarterback, the Colts defeated the Dallas Cowboys 35–3; the rusty Cowboys' previous game was three weeks earlier, on December 19. This capped a season where the Western Conference won 15 out of 16 interconference games against the Eastern Conference, including the championship game and Playoff Bowl.

The tiebreaker playoff between Green Bay and Baltimore was the last for the NFL; the league expanded to sixteen teams in four divisions in 1967 and a point differential was introduced to break ties. It was used that year in the Coastal Division, where Baltimore (11–1–2) tied with Los Angeles for the best overall record in the league, but was left out of the postseason, which consisted of the four division winners only; the wild card team was introduced in 1970 with the realignment of the AFL–NFL merger. The American Football League (AFL) had two tiebreaker playoff games, the last in 1968.

== Regular season ==
=== Final standings ===
NFL Eastern Conference
	W	L	T	PCT	CONF	PF	PA	STK
Cleveland Browns	11	3	0	.786	11–1	363	325	W1
Dallas Cowboys	7	7	0	.500	6–6	325	280	W3
New York Giants	7	7	0	.500	7–5	270	338	L1
Washington Redskins	6	8	0	.429	6–6	257	301	W1
Philadelphia Eagles	5	9	0	.357	5–7	363	359	L1
St. Louis Cardinals	5	9	0	.357	5–7	296	309	L6
Pittsburgh Steelers	2	12	0	.143	2–10	202	397	L7

Note: Tie games were not officially counted in the standings until 1972.

NFL Western Conference
	W	L	T	PCT	CONF	PF	PA	STK
Green Bay Packers	10	3	1	.769	8–3–1	316	224	T1
Baltimore Colts	10	3	1	.769	8–3–1	389	284	W1
Chicago Bears	9	5	0	.643	7–5	409	275	L1
San Francisco 49ers	7	6	1	.538	6–5–1	421	402	T1
Minnesota Vikings	7	7	0	.500	5–7	383	403	W2
Detroit Lions	6	7	1	.462	4–7–1	257	295	W1
Los Angeles Rams	4	10	0	.286	2–10	269	328	L1

== Postseason ==
=== Bracket ===
Western Conference playoff December 26			NFL Championship; January 2, 1966
			E	Cleveland	12
W	Baltimore	10	W	Green Bay	23
W	Green Bay	13

Both games were at Lambeau Field in Green Bay, Wisconsin

=== Western Conference playoff ===
Green Bay Packers 13, Baltimore Colts 10 (OT)

Quarter	1	2	3	4	OT	Total
Colts	7	3	0	0	0	10
Packers	0	0	7	3	3	13

at Lambeau Field, Green Bay, Wisconsin

- Date: December 26, 1965
- Game time: 1:05 p.m. CST
- Game weather: 22 °F (−6 °C), wind 10 mph (16 km/h), wind chill 12 °F (−11 °C), relative humidity 85%
- Game attendance: 50,484
- Referee: Norm Schachter
- Pro-Football-Reference

Game information

Scoring

- First quarter
  - BAL – Don Shinnick 25-yard fumble recovery return (Lou Michaels kick). Colts 7–0
- Second quarter
  - BAL – Lou Michaels 15-yard field goal. Colts 10–0
- Third quarter
  - GB – Paul Hornung 1-yard run (Don Chandler kick). Colts 10–7
- Fourth quarter
  - GB – Don Chandler 22-yard field goal. Tied 10–10
- Overtime
  - GB – Don Chandler 25-yard field goal. Packers 13–10

Top passers

- BAL – Tom Matte – 5/12, 40 yards
- GB – Zeke Bratkowski – 22/39, 248 yards, 2 INT

Top rushers

- BAL – Tom Matte – 17 rushes, 57 yards
- GB – Jim Taylor – 23 rushes, 60 yards

Top receivers

- BAL – John Mackey – 3 receptions, 25 yards
- GB – Bill Anderson – 8 receptions, 78 yards

Due to injuries, Tom Matte was the starting quarterback for the Colts. Meanwhile, for the Packers, Bart Starr suffered an injury to his ribs after throwing one pass that necessitated Zeke Bratkowski getting into the game.

Having tied the game with 1:58 remaining, Don Chandler hit a 25-yard field goal in overtime to get the Packers into the NFL championship game.

=== NFL Championship Game ===
Green Bay Packers 23, Cleveland Browns 12

Quarter	1	2	3	4	Total
Browns	9	3	0	0	12
Packers	7	6	7	3	23

at Lambeau Field, Green Bay, Wisconsin

- Date: January 2, 1966
- Game time: 1:05 p.m. CST
- Game weather: 26 °F (−3 °C), wind 11 mph (18 km/h), wind chill 16 °F (−9 °C), relative humidity 92%
- Game attendance: 50,852
- Referee: George Rennix
- Pro-Football-Reference

Game information

Scoring

- First quarter
  - GB – Carroll Dale 47-yard pass from Bart Starr (Don Chandler kick). Packers 7–0
  - CLE – Collins 17-yard pass from Frank Ryan (American football) (kick failed). Packers 7–6
  - CLE – Lou Groza 24-yard field goal. Browns 9–7
- Second quarter
  - GB – Don Chandler 15-yard field goal. Packers 10–9
  - GB – Don Chandler 23-yard field goal. Packers 13–9
  - CLE – Lou Groza 28-yard field goal. Packers 13–12
- Third quarter
  - GB – Paul Hornung 13-yard run (Chandler kick). Packers 20–12
- Fourth quarter
  - GB – Don Chandler 29-yard field goal. Packers 23–12

Top passers

- CLE – Frank Ryan – 8/18, 115 yards, 1 TD, 2 INT
- GB – Bart Starr – 10/18, 147 yards, 1 TD, 1 INT

Top rushers

- CLE – Jim Brown – 12 rushes, 50 yards
- GB – Paul Hornung – 18 rushes, 105 yards, 1 TD

Top receivers

- CLE – Jim Brown – 3 receptions, 44 yards
- GB – Carroll Dale – 2 receptions, 60 yards, 1 TD
