= Don Chandler =

American football player (1934–2011)

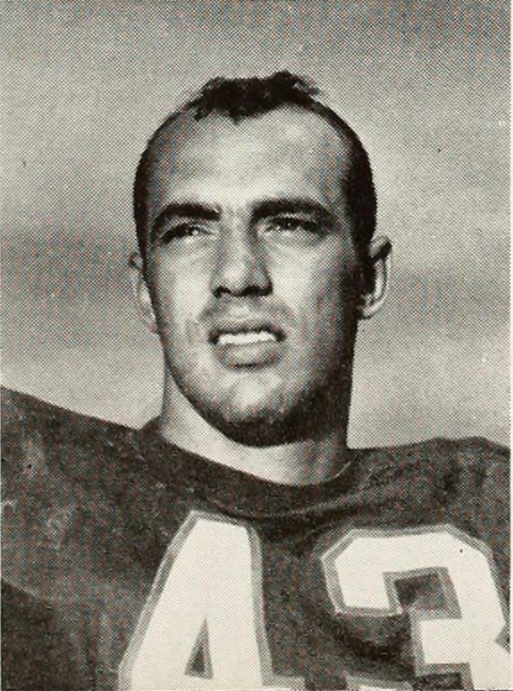
- Chandler, c. 1956

No. 34
- Positions: Placekicker, punter

Personal information
- Born: September 5, 1934; Council Bluffs, Iowa, U.S.
- Died: August 11, 2011 (aged 76); Tulsa, Oklahoma, U.S.
- Listed height: 6 ft 2 in (1.88 m)
- Listed weight: 215 lb (98 kg)

Career information
- High school: Will Rogers (Tulsa)
- College: Florida
- NFL draft: 1956: 5th round, 57th overall pick

Career history
- New York Giants (1956–1964); Green Bay Packers (1965–1967)

Awards and highlights
- 2× Super Bowl champion (1966, 1967); 4× NFL champion (1956, 1965, 1966, 1967); Pro Bowl (1967); NFL scoring leader (1963); NFL 1960s All-Decade Team; Green Bay Packers Hall of Fame; 73rd greatest New York Giant of all-time

Career NFL statistics
- Field goals: 94/161 (58.4%)
- Extra points: 248/259 (96.1%)
- Punts: 660
- Punting average: 43.5
- Stats at Pro Football Reference

Donald Gene "Babe" Chandler (September 5, 1934 – August 11, 2011) was an American professional football player who was a punter and placekicker for 12 seasons in the National Football League (NFL) in the 1950s and 1960s. Chandler played college football for the Florida Gators, and thereafter, he played professionally for the New York Giants and the Green Bay Packers of the NFL.

== Early life ==
Chandler was born in Council Bluffs, Iowa. He attended Will Rogers High School in Tulsa, Oklahoma, and he played for the Will Rogers Ropers high school football team.

== College career ==
After graduating from high school, Chandler first attended Bacone College in Muskogee, Oklahoma, and then transferred to the University of Florida in Gainesville, Florida, where he played halfback, punter and placekicker for coach Bob Woodruff's Florida Gators football team in 1954 and 1955. As a senior in 1955, Chandler led all major college punters with an average kick of 44.3 yards, narrowly beating out Earl Morrall of the Michigan State Spartans. Memorably, Chandler also kicked a 76-yard punt against the Georgia Tech Yellow Jackets in 1955, which remains tied for the second longest punt in Gators history. Woodruff ranked him and Bobby Joe Green as the Gators' best kickers of the 1950s.

Chandler graduated from Florida with a bachelor's degree in 1956, and was later inducted into the University of Florida Athletic Hall of Fame as a "Gator Great."

== Professional career ==
After college, he was selected in the fifth round (57th pick overall) of the 1956 NFL draft, and played with the New York Giants and Green Bay Packers. He played in the first two overtime games ever in the NFL, in 1958 with the Giants against the Baltimore Colts and again in 1965 when he kicked the winning field goal for the Packers against the same Colts in a Western Conference playoff game at Green Bay. Chandler's fourth-quarter field goal that tied the game at 10–10 stirred controversy, as many Baltimore players and fans (and even Chandler himself) thought he missed the kick to the right. Footage of the kick shows a disgusted Chandler flip his head back in anger after he supposedly missed his kick. Chandler was named the punter on the NFL 1960s All-Decade Team. He went to the Pro Bowl after the 1967 season.

He led the NFL in average yards per punt with 44.6 yards in 1957 and led the league with a field goal percentage of 67.9 percent on 19 of 28 attempts in 1962. Chandler set a record for most field goals scored in a Super Bowl with four in the 1968 edition of the Super Bowl against the Oakland Raiders, clinching the championship for the Packers; Ray Wersching tied him fourteen years later.

Chandler helped Vince Lombardi's Green Bay Packers teams win Super Bowls I and II. Memorably, he kicked a 90-yard punt against the San Francisco 49ers in 1965. He was named to the All Pro team in 1967.

In his 12-season NFL career, Chandler played in 154 regular season games, kicked 660 punts for a total of 28,678 yards, 248 extra points on 258 attempts, and 94 field goals on 161 attempts. He also rushed for 146 yards on 13 carries, and completed a perfect three passes on three attempts for a total of 67 yards.

== Life after football ==
Chandler was inducted into the Packer Hall of Fame in 1975, along with tight end Ron Kramer, defensive end Willie Davis, guards Jerry Kramer and Fuzzy Thurston and Vince Lombardi. He was selected as the premier punter for the decade in the 1960s. In 2002, he was named to the Oklahoma Team of the Century by The Oklahoman. In 2003, he was added to the list of Oklahoma's Greatest Athletes by the Tulsa World. Chandler is also a member of the Oklahoma Sports Hall of Fame and the New York Giants Wall of Fame.

Chandler died at his home in Tulsa, Oklahoma on August 11, 2011; he was 76 years old.

== See also ==
- List of Florida Gators in the NFL draft
- List of University of Florida alumni
- List of University of Florida Athletic Hall of Fame members
