= 1966 Baltimore Colts season =

14th season in franchise history; second "Playoff Bowl" win

- Owner: Carroll Rosenbloom
- General manager: Don "Red" Kellett
- Head coach: Don Shula
- Home stadium: Memorial Stadium

Results
- Record: 9–5
- Division place: 2nd NFL Western
- Playoffs: Won NFL Playoff Bowl (vs. Eagles) 20–14
- All-Pros: TE John Mackey
- Pro Bowlers: DE Ordell Braase, CB Lenny Lyles, TE John Mackey, QB Johnny Unitas

The 1966 Baltimore Colts season was the 14th season for the team in the National Football League. The Baltimore Colts finished the National Football League's 1966 season with a record of 9 wins and 5 losses and finished second in the Western Conference.

== Offseason ==
=== NFL draft ===
1966 Baltimore Colts draft
Round	Pick	Player	Position	College	Notes
1	15	Sam Ball	Offensive tackle	Kentucky	
2	33	Butch Allison	Guard	Missouri	
3	47	Rick Kestner	Wide receiver	Kentucky	
4	54	Rod Sherman	Wide receiver	USC	
4	63	Hoyle Granger *	Running back	Mississippi State	
6	95	Stas Maliszewski	Linebacker	Princeton	
7	105	Dave Ellis	Defensive end	NC State	
7	110	Ray Perkins	Wide receiver	Alabama	
8	120	Gerry Allen	Running back	Nebraska–Omaha	
8	125	Jack White	Quarterback	Penn State	
9	140	Jerry Gross	Running back	Auburn	
Made roster * Made at least one Pro Bowl during career

=== Undrafted free agents ===
1966 undrafted free agents of note
Player	Position	College
Dave Connell	Quarterback/Punter	Villanova
Fred Custardo	Quarterback	Illinois

== Personnel ==
=== Staff/coaches ===
1966 Baltimore Colts staff
Front office: Owner/president and treasurer – Carroll Rosenbloom; Vice president/general manager – Joe Campanella; Coaching staff: Head coach – Don Shula; Offensive coaches: Receivers/offensive ends – Dick Bielski; Offensive backs – Don McCafferty; Offensive line coach - John Sandusky	Defensive coaches: Defensive coordinator/defensive line - Bill Arnsparger; Defensive backfield – Chuck Noll; Linebackers coach – Don Shula

=== Roster ===
1966 Baltimore Colts roster
Quarterbacks (QB): 15 Gary Cuozzo; 19 Johnny Unitas; Running backs (RB): 34 Bob Baldwin; 45 Jerry Hill; 33 Tony Lorick; 41 Tom Matte; 24 Lenny Moore; Wide receivers (WR): 82 Raymond Berry; 28 Jimmy Orr; 84 Neal Petties; 87 Willie Richardson; Tight ends (TE): 88 John Mackey; 86 Butch Wilson	Offensive linemen (OL): 73 Sam Ball T; 67 Dale Memmelaar G; 77 Jim Parker T; 62 Glenn Ressler G; 68 Alex Sandusky G; 71 Dan Sullivan G; 52 Dick Szymanski C; 72 Bob Vogel T; Defensive linemen (DL): 81 Ordell Braase DE; 85 Roy Hilton DE; 89 Gino Marchetti DE; 79 Lou Michaels DE/K; 76 Fred Miller DT; 74 Billy Ray Smith DT	Linebackers (LB): 36 Barry Brown OLB; 55 Jackie Burkett OLB; 32 Mike Curtis OLB; 35 Ted Davis MLB; 53 Dennis Gaubatz MLB; 66 Don Shinnick OLB; Defensive backs (DB): 40 Bobby Boyd CB; 42 George Harold CB; 30 Alvin Haymond FS; 20 Jerry Logan SS; 43 Lenny Lyles CB; 46 Jim Welch CB/S; Special teams (ST): 49 David Lee P	Practice squad: 63 Butch Allison G; 65 Dick Anderson T; 25 Tom Bleick S; 78 Claude Brownlee DT; 69 Dave Hankee DT; 80 Rick Kestner WR; 75 Bob Lurtsema DE; 47 Al Snyder WR; 16 Jim Ward QB; Reserve: 44 Gerry Allen RB (IR); -- Dave Ellis T (Left squad); -- Corky Rogers WR (Military); 31 Steve Stonebreaker LB (IR); 83 Andy Stynchula DT (IR); Rookies in italics

== Regular season ==
=== Schedule ===
Week	Date	Opponent	Result	Record	Venue	Attendance
1	September 10	at **Green Bay Packers**	**L** 3–24	0–1	Milwaukee County Stadium	48,650
2	September 18	at **Minnesota Vikings**	**W** 38–23	1–1	Metropolitan Stadium	47,426
3	September 25	**San Francisco 49ers**	**W** 36–14	2–1	Memorial Stadium	56,715
4	Bye					
5	October 9	at **Chicago Bears**	**L** 17–27	2–2	Wrigley Field	47,452
6	October 16	**Detroit Lions**	**W** 45–14	3–2	Memorial Stadium	60,238
7	October 23	**Minnesota Vikings**	**W** 20–17	4–2	Memorial Stadium	60,238
8	October 30	at **Los Angeles Rams**	**W** 17–3	5–2	Los Angeles Memorial Coliseum	57,898
9	November 6	Washington Redskins	**W** 37–10	6–2	Memorial Stadium	60,238
10	November 13	at Atlanta Falcons	**W** 19–7	7–2	Atlanta Stadium	58,850
11	November 20	at **Detroit Lions**	**L** 14–20	7–3	Tiger Stadium	52,383
12	November 27	**Los Angeles Rams**	**L** 7–23	7–4	Memorial Stadium	60,238
13	December 4	**Chicago Bears**	**W** 21–16	8–4	Memorial Stadium	60,238
14	December 10	**Green Bay Packers**	**L** 10–14	8–5	Memorial Stadium	60,238
15	December 18	at **San Francisco 49ers**	**W** 30–14	9–5	Kezar Stadium	40,005
Note: Intra-conference opponents are in **bold** text.

- A bye week was necessary in 1966, as the league expanded to an odd-number (15) of teams (Atlanta); one team was idle each week.

=== Standings ===
NFL Western Conference
	W	L	T	PCT	CONF	PF	PA	STK
Green Bay Packers	12	2	0	.857	10–2	335	163	W5
Baltimore Colts	9	5	0	.643	7–5	314	226	W1
Los Angeles Rams	8	6	0	.571	6–6	289	212	L1
San Francisco 49ers	6	6	2	.500	5–5–2	320	325	L1
Chicago Bears	5	7	2	.417	4–6–2	234	272	W1
Detroit Lions	4	9	1	.308	3–8–1	206	317	L3
Minnesota Vikings	4	9	1	.308	4–7–1	292	304	L1

Note: Tie games were not officially counted in the standings until 1972.

=== Game summaries ===
==== Week 3: vs San Francisco 49ers ====
Week Three: San Francisco 49ers (0–0–1) at Baltimore Colts (1–1)

Quarter	1	2	3	4	Total
49ers	7	0	0	7	**14**
Colts	6	10	6	14	**36**

at Memorial Stadium, Baltimore, Maryland

- Date: September 25
- Game weather: 56 °F (13 °C)
- Box Score

Game information

**First quarter**

- BAL – Lou Michaels 41-yard field goal. Colts 3–0.
- SF – Bernie Casey 20-yard pass from John Brodie (Tommy Davis) kick. 49ers 7-3.
- BAL – Lou Michaels 37-yard field goal. 49ers 7-6

**Second quarter**

- BAL – Lou Michaels 25-yard field goal. Colts 9-7.
- BAL – John Mackey 57-yard pass from Johnny Unitas (Lou Michaels kick). Colts 16-7

**Third quarter**

- BAL – Lou Michaels 23-yard field goal. Colts 19–7.
- BAL – Lou Michaels 30-yard field goal. Colts 22-7.

**Fourth quarter**

- BAL – Lenny Moore 1-yard run (Lou Michaels kick). Colts 29–7.
- BAL – Butch Wilson 7-yard pass from Johnny Unitas (Lou Michaels kick). Colts 36–7.
- SF – Kent Kramer 17-yard pass from George Mira (Tommy Davis kick). Colts 36–14.

**Top passers**

- 49ers – John Brodie – 16/25, 159 yards, TD, INT
- Colts – Johnny Unitas – 14/30, 225 yards, 2 TD, INT

**Top rushers**

- 49ers – Ken Willard – 10 rushes, 33 yards
- Colts – Tony Lorick – 18 rushes, 110 yards

**Top receivers**

- 49ers – Dave Parks – 4 receptions, 52 yards
- Colts – John Mackey – 3 receptions, 76 yards, TD

==== Week 5: at Chicago Bears ====
Week Five: Baltimore Colts (2–1) at Chicago Bears (1–2)

Quarter	1	2	3	4	Total
Colts	0	3	7	7	**17**
Bears	10	0	10	7	**27**

at Wrigley Field, Chicago, Illinois

- Date: Sunday, October 9
- Game weather: 67 °F (19 °C), wind 12 mph
- Box Score

Game information

First Quarter

- CHI – Roger LeClerc 42-yard field goal – **Bears 3–0**
- CHI – Joe Fortunato 24-yard fumble return (Roger LeClerc kick) – **Bears 10–0**

Second Quarter

- BAL – Lou Michaels 13-yard field goal – **Bears 10–3**

Third Quarter

- CHI – Gale Sayers 30-yard run (Roger LeClerc kick) – **Bears 17–3**
- CHI – Roger LeClerc 27-yard field goal – **Bears 20–3**
- BAL – Bobby Boyd 37-yard interception return (Lou Michaels kick) – **Bears 20–10**

Fourth Quarter

- CHI – Gale Sayers 7-yard run (Roger LeClerc kick) – **Bears 27–10**
- BAL – John Mackey 79-yard pass from Johnny Unitas (Lou Michaels kick) – **Bears 27–17**

**Top Passers**

- Colts – Johnny Unitas, 18/38, 274 Yds, TD, 2 INT
- Bears – Rudy Bukich, 8/15, 96 Yds, INT

**Top Rushers**

- Colts – Tom Matte, 4 Rush, 57 Yds
- Bears – Gale Sayers, 18 Rush, 106 Yds, 2 TD

**Top Receivers**

- Colts – John Mackey, 2 Rec, 89 Yds, TD
- Bears – Jimmy Jones, 3 Rec, 64 Yds

==== Week 6 vs Detroit Lions ====
Week Six: Detroit Lions (2–3) at Baltimore Colts (2–2)

Quarter	1	2	3	4	Total
Lions	0	0	7	7	**14**
Colts	7	17	7	14	**45**

at Memorial Stadium, Baltimore

- Date: October 16
- Game weather: 64 °F (18 °C)
- Box Score

Game information

**First quarter**

- Baltimore– Tony Lorick 5-yard rush (Michaels kick), Colts 7–0.

**Second quarter**

- Baltimore – Tom Matte 28-yard pass from Johnny Unitas (Michaels kick), Colts 14–0.
- Baltimore – John Mackey 51-yard pass from Johnny Unitas (Michaels kick), Colts 21–0.
- Baltimore – Lou Michaels 47-yard field goal, Colts 24–0.

**Third quarter**

- Detroit – Pat Studstill 4-yard pass from Milt Plum (Walker kick), Colts 24–7.
- Baltimore – Jimmy Orr 3-yard pass from Johnny Unitas (Michaels kick), Colts 31–7.

**Fourth quarter**

- Baltimore – Raymond Berry 17-yard pass from Johnny Unitas (Michaels kick), Colts 38–7.
- Detroit – Pat Studstill 99-yard pass from Karl Sweetan (Walker kick), Colts 38–14.
- Baltimore – Willie Richardson 5-yard pass from Gary Cuozzo (Michaels kick), Colts 45–14.

**Top Passers**

- Lions – Milt Plum: 16/28, 107 yds, 1 TD, 1 INT
- Colts – Johnny Unitas: 18/27, 218 yds, 4 TD

**Top rushers**

- Lions – Amos Marsh: 11 car, 36 yds
- Colts – Tom Matte: 13 car, 73 yds.

**Top receivers**

- Lions – Pat Studstill: 6 rec, 141 yds. 2 TD
- Colts – Jimmy Orr: 6 rec, 78 yds. 1 TD

==== Week 14: vs. Green Bay Packers ====
Week Fourteen: Green Bay Packers (10–2) at Baltimore Colts (8–4)

Quarter	1	2	3	4	Total
Packers	7	0	0	7	**14**
Colts	0	10	0	0	**10**

at Memorial Stadium, Baltimore, Maryland

- Date: Saturday, December 10
- Game weather: 21 °F (−6 °C)
- Box Score

Game information

**First quarter**

- GB – Elijah Pitts 42-yard pass from Bart Starr (Don Chandler kick)

**Second quarter**

- BAL – Tony Lorick 1-yard run (Lou Michaels kick)
- BAL – Lou Michaels 26-yard field goal

**Fourth quarter**

- GB – Elijah Pitts 2-yard run (Don Chandler kick)

**Passing**

- GB – Bart Starr 7/15, 96 yards, TD
- BAL – Johnny Unitas 11/24, 140 yards, 3 INT

**Rushing**

- GB – Elijah Pitts 11 att, 43 yards, TD
  Jim Taylor 17 att, 43 yards
- BAL – Jerry Hill 25 att, 88 yards

**Receiving**

- GB – Elijah Pitts 4 rec, 79 yards, TD
- BAL – Raymond Berry 4 rec, 59 yards

Quarterback Zeke Bratkowski, in relief of Bart Starr, who suffered a muscle spasm in the first half, directed an 80-yard drive in the fourth quarter that resulted in a go-ahead touchdown run by Elijah Pitts for the Packers. John Unitas then led the Colts to the Green Bay 15, but there lost a fumble which came to be known as the 'Million Dollar Fumble', to secure the Packers' win that clinched the Western Conference title for Green Bay.

== Playoff Bowl ==
Round	Date	Opponent	Result	Record	Venue	Attendance
Playoff Bowl	January 8, 1967	Philadelphia Eagles	W 20–14	1–0	Miami Orange Bowl	58,088

== See also ==
- History of the Indianapolis Colts
- Indianapolis Colts seasons
