= 1966 Detroit Lions season =

NFL team season

- Owner: William Clay Ford Sr.
- General manager: Edwin J. Anderson
- Head coach: Harry Gilmer
- Home stadium: Tiger Stadium

Results
- Record: 4–9–1
- Division place: 6th NFL Western
- Playoffs: Did not qualify
- All-Pros: Pat Studstill
- Pro Bowlers: Dick LeBeau, Roger Brown, Pat Studstill

The 1966 Detroit Lions season marked the team's 37th year in the National Football League (NFL). The team failed to improve on their previous season's output of 6–7–1, winning only four games. They missed the playoffs for the ninth straight year and incurred their second losing record in a row.

== Offseason ==
=== NFL draft ===
1966 Detroit Lions draft
Round	Pick	Player	Position	College	Notes
2	24	Nick Eddy	Running back	Notre Dame	
3	39	Bill Malinchak	Wide receiver	Indiana	
4	55	Doug Van Horn	Guard	Ohio State	
4	59	Willie Walker	Wide receiver	Tennessee State	
5	67	Bill Cody	Linebacker	Auburn	
6	87	Wayne DeSutter	Offensive tackle	Western Illinois	
7	103	Johnnie Robinson	Wide receiver	Tennessee State	
8	117	John Pincavage	Running back	Virginia	
9	136	Dick Cunningham	Offensive tackle	Arkansas	
10	148	Bruce Yates	Offensive tackle	Auburn	
10	150	Tom Brigham	Defensive end	Wisconsin	
11	164	Jack O'Billovich	Linebacker	Oregon State	
12	178	Randy Winkler	Offensive tackle	Tarleton State	
13	192	Bill Masselter	Tackle	Wisconsin	
14	211	Denis Moore	Tackle	USC	
15	225	Bill Sullivan	Defensive end	West Virginia	
16	239	Jerry Gendron	Wide receiver	Wisconsin–Eau Claire	
17	253	Ralph Dunlap	Defensive end	Baylor	
18	267	Bill Johnson	Wide receiver	Livingstone	
19	286	Bob Baier	Tackle	Simpson	
20	300	Allen Smith	Running back	Findlay	
Made roster

=== Undrafted free agents ===
1966 undrafted free agents of note
Player	Position	College
Dempsey Harrison	Running back	Wayne State
Tom Sayer	Tackle	Butler
Haywood Sharpley	Running back	Wayne State

== Personnel ==
=== Staff / Coaches ===
1966 Detroit Lions staff
Front office: Owner / Team President - William Clay Ford, Sr.; Vice President / General manager - Edwin J. Anderson; Director of Player Personnel - Russ Thomas; Treasurer - Newton S. Peters; Publicity Director / Business Manager - Lyall Smith; Assistant Publicity Director - Elliott Trumbull; Equipment manager - Roy Marklem; Head coaches: Head coach – Harry Gilmer; Offensive coaches: Quarterbacks / Offensive Backs - Sammy Baugh; Offensive Line - Lou Rymkus; Wide Receivers - Johnny North	Defensive coaches: Defensive Secondary - Carl Taseff; Defensive Line - Carl Brettschneider; Linebackers Coach - Joe Schmidt; Strength and conditioning: Trainer - Millard Kelley; Assistant Trainer - Kent Falb

=== Final roster ===
1966 Detroit Lions roster
Quarterbacks: 18 Tom Myers; 14 Karl Sweetan; Running backs: 45 Bobby Felts; 31 Amos Marsh; 35 Tom Nowatzke; 34 Jim Todd; Wide receivers: 89 Gail Cogdill; 87 John Henderson; 81 Bill Malinchak; 25 Pat Studstill P; 40 Willie Walker; Tight ends: 88 Ron Kramer	Offensive linemen: 50 Mike Alford C; 54 Ed Flanagan C; 75 John Gordy G; 66 Bob Kowalkowski G; 70 Daryl Sanders T; 73 Roger Shoals T; 72 J. D. Smith T; 60 Doug Van Horn G; Defensive linemen: 76 Roger Brown DT; 74 Larry Hand DE; 71 Alex Karras DT; 83 Jerry Mazzanti DE; 78 Darris McCord DE; 82 Jerry Rush DT	Linebackers: 59 Ernie Clark OLB; 67 Wally Hilgenberg OLB; 53 Mike Lucci MLB; 51 Lou Slaby MLB; 55 Wayne Walker OLB; Defensive backs: 46 Jim Kearney CB; 44 Dick LeBeau CB; 21 Bruce Maher SS; 47 Wayne Rasmussen FS; 49 Johnnie Robinson CB/S; 43 Bobby Smith FS; 27 Bobby Thompson CB; 48 Tom Vaughn SS; Special teams: 1 Garo Yepremian K	Reserve lists: 61 Jim Edgerly G (IR); 80 Jim Gibbons TE (IR); 24 Bruce McLenna RB (IR); 57 Jack O'Billovich LB (IR); 16 Milt Plum QB (IR); 23 Tom Watkins RB (IR); -- Warren Wells WR (Military); Taxi squad: 52 Bill Cody LB; -- Bill Cottrell C; 38 Frank Marsh S; _{40 active, 7 reserve, 3 taxi / practice squad} rookies in italics

== Regular season ==
=== Schedule ===
Game	Date	Opponent	Result	Record	Venue	Attendance	Recap	Sources
1	September 11	**Chicago Bears**	**W** 14–3	1–0	Tiger Stadium	52,225	Recap	
2	September 18	at Pittsburgh Steelers	**L** 3–17	1–1	Pitt Stadium	35,473	Recap	
3	September 25	Atlanta Falcons	**W** 28–10	2–1	Tiger Stadium	47,615	Recap	
4	October 2	at **Green Bay Packers**	**L** 14–23	2–2	Lambeau Field	50,861	Recap	
5	October 9	**Los Angeles Rams**	**L** 7–14	2–3	Tiger Stadium	52,793	Recap	
6	October 16	at **Baltimore Colts**	**L** 14–45	2–4	Memorial Stadium	60,238	Recap	
7	October 23	at **San Francisco 49ers**	**L** 24–27	2–5	Kezar Stadium	36,745	Recap	
8	October 30	**Green Bay Packers**	**L** 7–31	2–6	Tiger Stadium	56,954	Recap	
9	November 6	at **Chicago Bears**	**T** 10–10	2–6–1	Wrigley Field	47,041	Recap	
10	November 13	at **Minnesota Vikings**	**W** 32–31	3–6–1	Metropolitan Stadium	43,939	Recap	
11	November 20	**Baltimore Colts**	**W** 20–14	4–6–1	Tiger Stadium	52,383	Recap	
12	November 24	**San Francisco 49ers**	**L** 14–41	4–7–1	Tiger Stadium	53,189	Recap	
13	December 4	at **Los Angeles Rams**	**L** 3–23	4–8–1	L.A. Memorial Coliseum	40,039	Recap	
14	December 11	**Minnesota Vikings**	**L** 16–28	4–9–1	Tiger Stadium	43,022	Recap	
—	Bye							
Notes: Intra-conference opponents are in **bold** text. November 24: Thanksgiving.

- A bye week was necessary in 1966, as the league expanded to an odd-number (15) of teams (Atlanta). One team was idle each week.

== Standings ==
NFL Western Conference
	W	L	T	PCT	CONF	PF	PA	STK
Green Bay Packers	12	2	0	.857	10–2	335	163	W5
Baltimore Colts	9	5	0	.643	7–5	314	226	W1
Los Angeles Rams	8	6	0	.571	6–6	289	212	L1
San Francisco 49ers	6	6	2	.500	5–5–2	320	325	L1
Chicago Bears	5	7	2	.417	4–6–2	234	272	W1
Detroit Lions	4	9	1	.308	3–8–1	206	317	L3
Minnesota Vikings	4	9	1	.308	4–7–1	292	304	L1

Note: Tie games were not officially counted in the standings until 1972.
