= Super Bowl III =

Third AFL–NFL Championship Game

New York Jets (AFL) (11–3)	Baltimore Colts (NFL) (13–1)
16	7
Head coach: Weeb Ewbank	Head coach: Don Shula
	1	2	3	4	Total
NYJ	0	7	6	3	16
BAL	0	0	0	7	7
- Date: January 12, 1969
- Kickoff time: 3:05 p.m. EST (20:05 UTC)
- Stadium: Miami Orange Bowl; Miami, Florida
- MVP: Joe Namath, quarterback
- Favorite: Colts by 18.0
- Referee: Tom Bell
- Attendance: 75,389

Ceremonies
- National anthem: Lloyd Geisler of the Washington National Symphony Orchestra
- Halftime show: "America Thanks" with Florida A&M University band

TV in the United States
- Network: NBC
- Announcers: Curt Gowdy, Al DeRogatis, and Kyle Rote
- Nielsen ratings: 36.0 (est. 41.66 million viewers)
- Market share: 71
- Cost of 30-second commercial: $55,000

Radio in the United States
- Network: NBC Radio
- Announcers: Charlie Jones, George Ratterman and Pat Summerall

Super Bowl III was an American football championship game played on January 12, 1969, at the Orange Bowl in Miami, Florida. It was the third AFL–NFL Championship Game in professional American football, and the first to officially bear the trademark name "Super Bowl". Super Bowl III is regarded as one of the greatest upsets in both American football history and in the history of professional sports. The 18-point underdog American Football League (AFL) champion New York Jets defeated the National Football League (NFL) champion Baltimore Colts by a score of 16–7. (The point spread varied between 17.5 and 19.5 across different sportsbooks and moved during the week before the game.)

The game was the first of two Super Bowl victories for the AFL over the NFL. Before the game many sports writers and fans believed that AFL teams were less talented than NFL clubs, and expected the Colts to defeat the Jets by a wide margin. The Colts posted a 13–1 record in the regular season and defeated the Minnesota Vikings 24–14 in the Western Conference championship game, then shut out the Cleveland Browns, the only team to beat the Colts in the regular season, 34–0 in the NFL Championship Game. The Jets were 11–3 in the regular season, and defeated the Oakland Raiders 27–23 in the AFL Championship Game.

Jets quarterback Joe Namath famously made an appearance three days before the Super Bowl at the Miami Touchdown Club in which he personally guaranteed his team's victory. His team backed up his words by controlling the majority of the game, building a 16–0 lead by the fourth quarter off of a touchdown run by Matt Snell and three field goals by Jim Turner. Colts quarterback Earl Morrall threw three interceptions before being replaced by Johnny Unitas, who then led the Colts to their only touchdown, during the last few minutes of the game. With the victory, the Jets were the only winning team to score only one touchdown (either offensive, defensive, or special teams) until the New England Patriots in Super Bowl LIII. Namath, who completed 17 out of 28 passes for 206 yards, was named as the Super Bowl's most valuable player, making him the first player in Super Bowl history to be declared MVP without personally scoring or throwing for a touchdown.

This is the only Super Bowl whose matchup cannot (barring a future realignment and/or change to the playoff format) occur in the Super Bowl again, as both the Jets and Colts play in the American Football Conference (AFC).

As of 2026, this is the Jets’ only Super Bowl victory and appearance, and they currently hold the third longest active championship game appearance drought in the NFL.

== Background ==
=== Host selection process ===
The NFL awarded Super Bowl III to Miami on May 14, 1968, at the owners meetings held in Atlanta. It marked the second of eleven Super Bowls in the Miami area (as of 2022). It was also the second consecutive Super Bowl to be awarded to Miami (II and III), the only time that the Super Bowl has been hosted by the same stadium in back-to-back seasons. Two cities were considered for the game, New Orleans (Tulane Stadium) being the other.

Going into the meeting, several observers believed that New Orleans was the favorite. It had been reported that New Orleans was being promised the game by commissioner Pete Rozelle as a payback to Louisiana congressman Hale Boggs and senator Russell B. Long for being instrumental in passing crucial antitrust exemption legislation, which allowed for the AFL–NFL merger. In selecting Miami, owners rejected any potential quid pro quo. Miami's hosting of sold-out Super Bowl II just four months earlier was seen by all accounts as a huge success, and owners elected to stick with a known commodity. The expansion Saints had lost money in their first season, and were publicly going through front office shakeups. Furthermore, during the presentation, a mix-up in the Tulane Stadium rental fee helped dissuade the league. Rozelle made it clear, however, that Miami was not positioned to become the permanent home for the Super Bowl.

=== Professional football ===
The National Football League (NFL) had dominated professional football from its origins after World War I. Rival leagues had crumbled or merged with it, and when the American Football League (AFL) began to play in 1960, it was the fourth to hold that similar name to challenge the older NFL. Unlike its earlier namesakes, however, this AFL was able to command sufficient financial resources to survive; one factor in this was becoming the first league to sign a television contract—previously, individual franchises had signed agreements with networks to televise games. The junior league proved successful enough, in fact, to make attractive offers to players. After the 1964 season, there had been a well-publicized bidding war which culminated with the signing, by the AFL's New York Jets (formerly Titans of New York), of Alabama quarterback Joe Namath for an unprecedented contract. Fearing that bidding wars over players would become the norm, greatly increasing labor costs, NFL owners, ostensibly led by league Commissioner Pete Rozelle, obtained a merger agreement with the AFL in June 1966, which provided for a common draft, interleague play in the pre-season, a world championship game to follow each season, and the integration of the two leagues into one in a way to be agreed at a future date. As the two leagues had an unequal number of teams (under the new merger agreement, the NFL expanded to sixteen in 1967, and the AFL to ten in 1968), realignment was advocated by some owners, but was opposed. Eventually, three NFL teams (Cleveland Browns, Pittsburgh Steelers, and the Baltimore Colts) agreed to move over to join the ten AFL franchises in the American Football Conference.

Despite the ongoing merger, it was a commonly held view that the NFL was a far superior league. This was seemingly confirmed by the results of the first two interleague championship games, in January 1967 and 1968, in which the NFL champion Green Bay Packers, coached by the legendary Vince Lombardi, easily defeated the AFL's Kansas City Chiefs and Oakland Raiders. Although publicized as the inter-league championship games, it was not until later that the moniker for this championship contest between the now two conferences (National and American) began having the nickname of "Super Bowl" applied to it by the media and later began being counted by using Roman numerals, the creation of the term being credited to the founder of the AFL, Lamar Hunt.

=== Baltimore Colts ===
The Baltimore Colts had won the 1958 and 1959 NFL championships under Coach Weeb Ewbank. In the following years, however, the Colts failed to make the playoffs, and the Colts dismissed Ewbank after a 7–7 record in 1962. He was soon hired by New York's new AFL franchise, which had just changed its name from the Titans to the Jets. In Ewbank's place, Baltimore hired an untested young head coach, Don Shula, who would also go on to become one of the game's greatest coaches. The Colts did well under Shula, despite losing to the Cleveland Browns in the 1964 NFL Championship Game and, in 1965, losing in overtime to the Green Bay Packers in a tie-breaker game to decide the NFL Western Conference title. The Colts finished a distant second in the West to the Packers in 1966, and in 1967, with the NFL realigned into four divisions of four teams each, went undefeated with two ties through their first 13 games, but lost the game and the Coastal Division championship to the Los Angeles Rams on the final Sunday of the season—under newly instituted tiebreakers procedures, L.A. won the division championship as it had better net points in the two games the teams played (the Rams win and an earlier tie). The Colts finished 11–1–2, tied for the best record in the league, but were excluded from the playoffs. In 1968, Shula and the Colts were considered a favorite to win the NFL championship again, which carried with it an automatic berth what was now becoming popularly known as the "Super Bowl" against the champion of the younger AFL. The NFL champion, in both cases the Green Bay Packers, had easily won the first two Super Bowls (1967 and 1968) over the AFL winner, establishing for a while then the superiority of the older NFL circuit.

Baltimore's quest for a championship seemed doomed from the start when long-time starting quarterback Johnny Unitas suffered a pre-season injury to his throwing arm and was replaced by Earl Morrall, a veteran who had started inconsistently over the course of his 12 seasons with four teams. But Morrall would go on to have the best year of his career, leading the league in passer rating (93.2) during the regular season. His performance was so impressive that Colts coach Don Shula decided to keep Morrall in the starting lineup after Unitas was healthy enough to play. The Colts had won ten games in a row, including four shutouts, and finished the season with an NFL-best 13–1 record. In those ten games, they had allowed only seven touchdowns. Then, the Colts avenged their sole regular-season loss against the Cleveland Browns by crushing them 34–0 in the NFL Championship Game.

The Colts offense ranked second in the NFL in points scored (402; only behind the Cowboys 431 points scored). Wide receivers Jimmy Orr (29 receptions, 743 yards, 6 touchdowns) and Willie Richardson (37 receptions, 698 yards, 8 touchdowns) provided Baltimore with two deep threats, with Orr averaging 25.6 yards per catch, and Richardson averaging 18.9. Tight end John Mackey also recorded 45 receptions for 644 yards and 5 touchdowns. Pro Bowl running back Tom Matte was the team's top rusher with 662 yards and 9 touchdowns. He also caught 25 passes for 275 yards and another touchdown. Running backs Terry Cole and Jerry Hill combined for 778 rushing yards and 236 receiving yards.

The Colts defense led the NFL in fewest points allowed (144, tying the 1963 Bears for the then all-time league record), and ranked third in total rushing yards allowed (1,339), while also recording 29 interceptions (2nd in the league) and holding their opponents to an NFL-low 9 touchdown passes. Bubba Smith, a 6′7″ 295-pound defensive end considered the NFL's best pass rusher, anchored the line. Linebacker Mike Curtis, who intercepted two passes and recovered three fumbles, was considered one of the top linebackers in the NFL. Baltimore's secondary consisted of defensive backs Bobby Boyd (8 interceptions), Rick Volk (6 interceptions), Lenny Lyles (5 interceptions), and Jerry Logan (3 interceptions). The Colts were the only NFL team to routinely play a zone defense. That gave them an advantage in the NFL because the other NFL teams were inexperienced against a zone defense. (This would not give them an advantage over the upstart New York Jets, however, because zone defenses were common in the AFL and the Jets knew how to attack them.)

=== New York Jets ===
The New York Jets, led by head coach Weeb Ewbank (who was the head coach of the Colts when they won the famous 1958 NFL Championship game and later the '59 title also), finished the season with an 11–3 regular season record (one of the losses was to the Oakland Raiders in the infamous "Heidi Game") and had to rally to defeat those same Raiders, 27–23, in a thrilling AFL Championship Game.

Jets quarterback Joe Namath threw for 3,147 yards during the regular season and completed 49.2 percent of his passes, but threw more interceptions (17) than touchdowns (15). Still, he led the offense effectively enough for them to finish the regular season with more total points scored (419) than Baltimore, and finished fourth in completion percentage, fifth in touchdown passes, and third in passing yards as one of only three quarterbacks to pass for over 3,000 yards in the AFL that season. Fundamentally, Namath usually found ways to win. For example, late in the fourth quarter of the AFL championship game, Namath threw an interception that allowed the Raiders to take the lead. But he then made up for his mistake by completing 3 consecutive passes on the ensuing drive, advancing the ball 68 yards in just 55 seconds to score a touchdown to regain the lead for New York. Future Hall of Fame wide receiver Don Maynard caught the game-winning pass in the end zone but strained his hamstring on the play.

The Jets had a number of offensive weapons that Namath used. Maynard had the best season of his career, catching 57 passes for 1,297 yards (an average of 22.8 yards per catch) and 10 touchdowns. Wide receiver George Sauer recorded 66 receptions for 1,141 yards and 3 touchdowns. Tight end Pete Lammons added 32 receptions for 400 yards and three touchdowns. The Jets rushing attack was also effective. Fullback Matt Snell, a power runner, was the top rusher on the team with 747 yards and 6 touchdowns, while elusive halfback Emerson Boozer contributed 441 yards and 5 touchdowns. Meanwhile, kicker Jim Turner made 34 field goals and 43 extra points for a combined total of 145 points.

The Jets defense led the AFL in total rushing yards allowed (1,195). Gerry Philbin, Paul Rochester, John Elliott, and Verlon Biggs anchored the defensive line. The Jets linebacking core was led by middle linebacker Al Atkinson. The secondary was led by defensive backs Johnny Sample (a former Colt who played on their 1958 NFL Championship team) who recorded 7 interceptions, and Jim Hudson, who recorded 5.

Several of the Jets' players had been cut by NFL teams. Maynard had been cut by the New York Giants after they lost the 1958 NFL Championship Game to the Colts and had to spend one year playing Canadian football before the Jets (then called the Titans) enabled him to return to his home country. "I kept a little bitterness in me," he says. Sample had been cut by the Colts. "I was almost in a frenzy by the time the game arrived," he says. "I held a private grudge against the Colts. I was really ready for that game. All of us were." Offensive tackle Winston Hill had been cut five years earlier by the Colts as a rookie in training camp. "Ordell Braase kept making me look bad in practice," he says. Hill would be blocking Braase in Super Bowl III.

At an all-night party to celebrate the Jets' victory over the Raiders at Namath's nightclub, Bachelors III, Namath poured champagne over Johnny Carson as the comedian commented, "First time I ever knew you to waste the stuff."

=== Postseason ===
The Colts advanced to the Super Bowl with two dominating wins. First, they jumped to a 21–0 fourth quarter lead against the Minnesota Vikings and easily held off their meager comeback attempt in the final period for a 24–14 win.

Then they faced the Cleveland Browns, who had defeated them in week 5 of the regular season. But in this game, they proved to be no challenge as Baltimore held them to just 173 total yards and only allowed them to cross midfield twice in the entire game. Matte scored three of the Colts' four rushing touchdowns as the team won easily, 34–0.

Meanwhile, New York in the AFL championship game faced a red hot Oakland Raiders team who had just defeated the Kansas City Chiefs 41–6 one week earlier, with quarterback Daryle Lamonica throwing five touchdown passes. The championship game was close and hard-fought the whole way through, with both teams trading scores at a relatively even pace. The momentum seemed to swing in the Raiders' favor when George Atkinson picked off a pass from Namath and returned it 32 yards to the Jets 5-yard line, setting up a touchdown that gave Oakland their first lead of the game at 23–20 with 8:18 left in regulation. But Namath quickly led the team back, completing a 10-yard pass to Sauer and a 52-yard pass to Maynard on the Raiders' six-yard line. On the next play, his six-yard touchdown pass to Maynard gave them a 27–23 lead they would never relinquish. Oakland's final three possessions of the game would result in a turnover on downs, a lost fumble, and time expiring in the game.

=== Super Bowl pregame news and notes ===
After the Jets' AFL championship victory, Namath stated to The New York Times sportswriter Dave Anderson, "There are five quarterbacks in the AFL who are better than Morrall." The five were himself, his backup Babe Parilli, Lamonica, John Hadl of the San Diego Chargers, and Bob Griese of the Miami Dolphins. Namath added, "You put Babe Parilli with Baltimore instead of Morrall and Baltimore might be better. Babe throws better than Morrall."

Tickets for the game were priced at $12, $8, and $6.

==== Namath's guarantee ====
Despite the Jets' accomplishments, AFL teams were generally not regarded as having the same caliber of talent as NFL teams. However, three days before the game, an intoxicated Namath appeared at the Miami Touchdown Club and boldly predicted to the audience, "We're gonna win the game. I guarantee it". Coach Ewbank later joked that he "could have shot" Namath for the statement. Namath made his famous "guarantee" in response to a rowdy Colts supporter at the club, who boasted the Colts would easily defeat the Jets. Namath said he never intended to make such a public prediction, and would not have done so if he had not been confronted by the fan. Sportswriter Dave Anderson did not think that the remark was notable because, he recalled, Namath had said similar things during the week ("I know we're gonna win" for example), but an article by Luther Evans of the Miami Herald made the statement famous. Namath's comments and subsequent performance in the game itself are one of the more famous instances in NFL lore.

The Colts, linebacker Curtis recalled, "sort of laughed at" Namath's guarantee. The team did not adjust the defense it had used during the season against the Jets because "that should be good enough," Curtis said. The AFL champions shared the confident feelings of their quarterback. According to Matt Snell, all of the Jets, not just Namath, were insulted and angry that they were 19.5-point underdogs. Most of the Jets considered the Raiders, whom they barely beat (27–23) in the AFL title game, a better team than the Colts. Indeed, watching films of the Colts and in preparation for the game, Jets coaching staff and offensive players noted that their offense was particularly suited against the Colts defense. The Colts defensive schemes relied on frequent blitzing, which covered up weak points in pass coverage. The Jets had an automatic contingency for such blitzes by short passing to uncovered tight ends or backs. After a film session the Wednesday prior to the game, Jets tight end Pete Lammons, a Texas native, was heard to drawl, "Damn, y'all, we gotta stop watching these films. We gonna get overconfident".

== Broadcasting ==
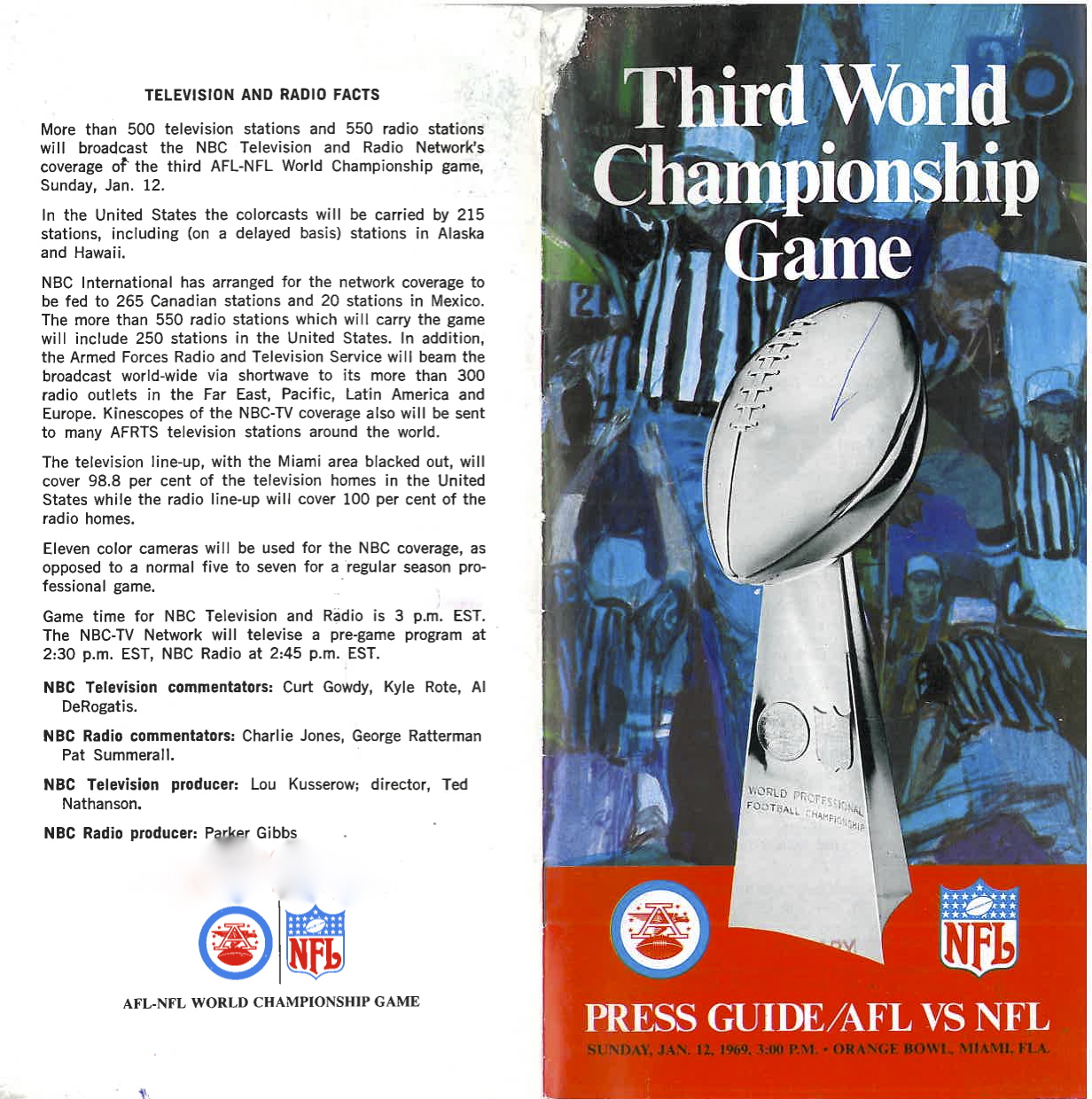
Super Bowl III media guide

The game was broadcast in the United States by NBC. Curt Gowdy handled the play-by-play duties and was joined by color commentators Al DeRogatis and Kyle Rote in the broadcast booth. Also helping with NBC's coverage were Jim Simpson (reporting from the sidelines) and Pat Summerall, on loan from CBS (helping conduct player interviews for the pregame show, along with Rote). In an interview later done with NFL Films, Gowdy called it the most memorable game he ever called because of its historical significance.

While the Orange Bowl was sold out for the game, the live telecast was not shown in Miami due to both leagues' unconditional blackout rules at the time.

41.66 million people in the US watched the game on television, resulting in a rating of 36 and a market share of 70. The original NBC broadcast was later aired as part of the NFL Network Super Bowl Classics series.

== Ceremonies and entertainment ==
"Mr. Football" was the title of the pregame show, which featured marching bands playing "Mr. Touchdown, U.S.A." as people in walking footballs representing all NFL and AFL teams except the Jets and Colts were paraded, after which performers representing a Jets player and a Colts player appeared on top of a large, multi-layered, smoke topped cake. Astronauts of the Apollo 8 mission (Frank Borman, Jim Lovell, and William Anders), the first crewed flight around the Moon, which had returned to Earth just 18 days prior to the game, then led the Pledge of Allegiance. Lloyd Geisler, first trumpeter of the Washington National Symphony Orchestra, performed the national anthem. The Florida A&M University band was featured during the "America Thanks" halftime show.

== Game summary ==
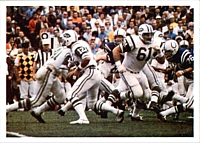
Namath (center-left) running a play for the Jets in Super Bowl III

New York entered the game with their primary deep threat, wide receiver Don Maynard, playing with a pulled hamstring. But his 112-yard, two touchdown performance against the Oakland Raiders in the AFL championship game made the Colts defense pay special attention to him, not realizing he was injured. Using Maynard as a decoy—he had no receptions in the game—Joe Namath was able to take advantage of single coverage on wide receiver George Sauer Jr. (After studying the Colts' zone defense, Ewbank had told his receivers, "Find the dead spots in the zone, hook up, and Joe will hit you.") The Jets had a conservative game plan, emphasizing the run as well as short high-percentage passes to minimize interceptions. Meanwhile, with the help of many fortunate plays, the Jets defense kept the Colts offense from scoring for most of the game. Also, Baltimore had a distinctly older group of players with 10+ years experience (Braase, Shinnick, Lyles, Boyd) on their defense's right side versus New York's younger, bigger left offensive side (Hill, Talamini, Schmitt, Sauer)--and back Snell when running left behind left tackle Hill, who thoroughly defeated defensive end Braase.

=== First quarter ===
Namath recalled that he did not become "dead serious" until, on the sideline before the game, he saw Unitas. The Jets, led by captains Namath and Johnny Sample, and Colts, led by captains Preston Pearson, Unitas, and Lyles, met at midfield where referee Tom Bell announced that the Jets had won the coin toss and had elected to receive the football. The coin toss had been conducted an hour prior to kickoff but this was done for the benefit of the spectators. Colts kicker Lou Michaels (the younger brother of Jets defensive coordinator, Walt Michaels) kicked the ball off to cornerback Earl Christy, who returned the ball 25 yards to the Jets' 23-yard line. Namath handed the ball off to running back Matt Snell on first down who carried it 3 yards. On second down, Snell carried the ball for 9 yards, earning the Jets their first first down of the game. Colts safety Rick Volk sustained a concussion when he tackled Snell and was subsequently lost for the game. On the ensuing play, running back Emerson Boozer lost four yards when he was tackled behind the line of scrimmage by linebacker Don Shinnick. Namath threw his first pass to Snell that gained 9 yards on 2nd-and-14, but a 2-yard loss by Snell on the following play forced the Jets to punt the ball. The Jets noticed, however, from watching film the predictability of the Colts' defense based on how the defensive players lined up. Instead of calling plays in the huddle, Namath instead mostly gave formations and snap counts to the offense in the huddle, and then called plays from the line of scrimmage, after seeing what formation the Colts were lined up in. Center John Schmitt recalled that the Colts were "in shock" and "it drove them crazy ... no matter what [the Colts] did, [Snell] would run it the other way".

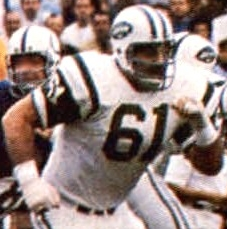
Jets' guard Bob Talamini pictured during a play in Super Bowl III

The Colts began their first offensive series on their own 27-yard line. Quarterback Earl Morrall completed a 19-yard pass to tight end John Mackey and then running back Tom Matte ran for 10 yards to place the ball on the Jets' 44-yard line. Running back Jerry Hill's runs of 7 and 5 yards picked up another Colts first down, then Morrall's pass to tight end Tom Mitchell gained 15 yards on 3rd-and-13 and saw the ball placed at the Jets' 19-yard line. In scoring position, Morrall attempted to score quickly against a reeling Jets defense. Wide receiver Willie Richardson dropped Morrall's pass on first down followed by an incompletion on second down after Mitchell was overthrown. On third down, none of his receivers were open and Morrall was tackled at the line of scrimmage by linebacker Al Atkinson. Michaels was brought out to attempt a 27-yard field goal, but he missed it wide right, keeping the game scoreless. "You could almost feel the steam go out of them", said Snell.

The Jets did not only rely on Snell; Namath said "if they're going to blitz, then we're going to throw". Shula said that Namath "beat our blitz" with his fast release, which let him quickly dump the football off to a receiver. On the Jets' second possession, Namath threw deep to Maynard, who, despite his pulled hamstring, was open by a step. The ball was overthrown, but this one play helped change the outcome of the game. Fearing the speedy Maynard, the Colts decided to rotate their zone defense to help cover Maynard, leaving Sauer covered one-on-one by cornerback Lenny Lyles, helping Sauer catch 8 passes for 133 yards, including a crucial third quarter 39-yard reception that kept a scoring drive alive. The Jets kept rushing Snell to their strong left, rushing off tackle with Boozer blocking the linebacker, and gained first down after first down as the Colts defense gave ground. The Colts defense was more concerned about Maynard, the passing game, and the deep threat of a Namath to Maynard touchdown. Although the Colts were unaware of Maynard's injury, the Jets were aware that Lyles had been weakened by tonsillitis all week, causing them great glee when they saw the one-on-one matchup with Sauer.

With less than two minutes left in the period, Colts punter David Lee booted a 51-yard kick that pinned the Jets back at their own 4-yard line. Three plays later, Sauer caught a 3-yard pass from Namath, but Lyles forced a fumble on Sauer, and Colts linebacker Ron Porter recovered it at New York's 12-yard line.

=== Second quarter ===
However, on third down (the second play of the second quarter), Morrall's pass was tipped by Atkinson, bounced crazily, high into the air off tight end Tom Mitchell, and was intercepted by Jets cornerback Randy Beverly in the end zone for a touchback. "That was the game in a nutshell," says Matte. Starting from their own 20-yard line, Snell rushed on the next 4 plays, advancing the ball 26 yards. The Jets would have success all day running off left tackle behind the blocking of offensive tackle Winston Hill, who, according to Snell, was overpowering 36-year-old defensive end Ordell Braase, the man who had tormented the rookie Hill in Colts' training camp. Said Snell, "Braase pretty much faded out." Namath later completed 3 consecutive passes, one of which was a 14-yard pass to Sauer, moving the ball to the Colts 23-yard line. Boozer gained just 2 yards on the next play, but Snell followed it up with a 12-yard reception at the 9-yard line and a 5-yard run to the 4-yard line, and capped the drive with a 4-yard touchdown run, once again off left tackle. The score gave the Jets a 7–0 lead, and marked the first time in history that an AFL team led in the Super Bowl.

On Baltimore's ensuing drive, a 30-yard completion from Morrall to running back Tom Matte helped the Colts advance to the Jets' 42-yard line, but they once again failed to score as Jets cornerback Johnny Sample broke up Morrall's third down pass and Michaels missed his second field goal attempt, this time from 46 yards. Two plays after the Jets took over following the missed field goal, Namath's 36-yard completion to Sauer enabled New York to eventually reach the Baltimore 32-yard line. But Namath then threw two incompletions, and was sacked on third down by Colts linebacker Dennis Gaubatz for a 2-yard loss. New York kicker Jim Turner tried to salvage the drive with a 41-yard field goal attempt, but he missed it wide left.

On their next possession, Baltimore went from their own 20-yard line to New York's 15-yard line in three plays, aided by Matte's 58-yard run (the longest play from scrimmage in the game). However, with 2 minutes left in the half, Morrall was intercepted again, this time by Sample at the Jets' 2-yard line, deflating the Colts considerably. The Jets then were forced to punt on their ensuing drive, and the Colts advanced the ball to New York's 41-yard line. What followed is one of the most famous plays in Super Bowl history. Baltimore tried a flea flicker play, which had a huge impact on the momentum of the game. Matte ran off right tackle after taking a handoff, then pitched the ball back to Morrall. The play completely fooled the NBC Camera Crew, and the Jets defense, leaving wide receiver Jimmy Orr wide open near the end zone. However, Morrall failed to spot him and instead threw a pass intended for running back Jerry Hill that was intercepted by Jets safety Jim Hudson as time expired, maintaining the Jets' 7–0 lead at halftime. Earlier in the season, against the Atlanta Falcons, on the same play, Morrall had completed the same pass for a touchdown to Orr, the play's intended target. "I was the primary receiver," Orr said later. "Earl said he just didn't see me. I was open from here to Tampa." "I'm just a lineman, but I looked up and saw Jimmy open," added center Bill Curry. "I don't know what happened." Some speculated that Morrall couldn't see Orr because the Florida A&M marching band (in blue uniforms similar to those worn by the Colts) was gathering behind the end zone for the halftime show.

=== Third quarter ===
The third quarter belonged to the Jets, who controlled the ball for all but three minutes of the period. Baltimore ran only seven offensive plays all quarter, gaining only 11 yards. On the first play from scrimmage in the second half, Jets defensive end Verlon Biggs forced a fumble on Matte, yet another demoralizing event, which was recovered by linebacker Ralph Baker on the Colts' 33-yard line, leading to Turner's 32-yard field goal to increase the Jets' lead, 10–0. Then after forcing the Colts to punt again, Namath completed 4 passes for 40 yards to set up Turner's 30-yard field goal to increase the lead, 13–0. On that drive, Namath temporarily went out of the game after injuring his right thumb and was replaced by backup quarterback Babe Parilli for a few plays. Namath returned by the end of the third quarter, but the Jets would not run a pass play for the entire fourth quarter.

Matt Snell said, "By this time, the Colts were pressing. You saw the frustration and worry on all their faces." After Turner's second field goal, with 4 minutes left in the third quarter, Colts head coach Don Shula took Morrall out of the game and put in the sore-armed Johnny Unitas to see if he could provide a spark to Baltimore's offense. Unitas could not get the Colts offense moving on their next drive and they were forced to punt again after 3 plays.

=== Fourth quarter ===
Aided by a 39-yard pass from Namath to Sauer, the Jets drove all the way to the Colts 2-yard line. Baltimore's defense would not quit, and kept them out of the end zone. Turner kicked his third field goal early in the final period to make the score a three-score lead, 16–0 (the two-point conversion, which would have made it a two-score game, was in use by the AFL at the time, but had not been adopted by the NFL yet and was not used for early Super Bowls).

The Colts' inability to score made Namath so confident by the fourth quarter, that he told Ewbank that he preferred to run out the clock instead of playing aggressively. Namath did not throw any passes in the quarter. On Baltimore's next possession, they managed to drive all the way to the Jets' 25-yard line. However, Beverly ended the drive by intercepting a pass intended for Orr from Unitas in the end zone, the Jets' fourth interception of the game, which was also his second interception of the game. New York then drove to the Colts 35-yard line with seven consecutive running plays, but ended up with no points after Turner missed a 42-yard field goal attempt wide left.

Unitas started out the next drive with three incomplete passes, but completed a key 17-yard pass to Orr on fourth down. Ten plays later, aided by an 11-yard reception by Mackey, a 21-yard reception by Richardson, and an 11-yard reception by Orr, Baltimore finally got on the board with a 1-yard touchdown run by Hill to cut their deficit to 16–7, but with only 3:19 left in the game. The Colts then recovered an onside kick and drove to the Jets' 19-yard line with three consecutive completions by Unitas, but his next three passes fell incomplete. Instead of kicking a field goal to cut their deficit to one score and attempting another onside kick (which would have been necessary in the end), the Colts elected to convert 4th-and-5, but Unitas' pass to Orr fell incomplete, turning the ball over on downs, and essentially putting the game away in favor of the Jets. With possession of the ball and a two-score lead, New York ran the ball for six plays, during which Snell converted a 3rd-and-4 for a first down and which the Jets forced the Colts to use up all of their timeouts and ran the clock down to 15 seconds before being forced to punt.

When Baltimore got the ball back, only 8 seconds remained in the game. The Colts then attempted two more passes before the game ended. Matt Snell said, "Leaving the field, I saw the Colts were exhausted and in a state of shock. I don't remember any Colt coming over to congratulate me". As he ran off the field, Namath, in a spontaneous show of defiance held up his index finger, signaling "number one"; "the only time I ever did that in my life", he said.

Namath finished the game having completed 17 of his 28 passes for 206 yards. He is the only quarterback to win Super Bowl MVP without throwing a touchdown pass. Snell rushed for 121 yards on 30 carries with a touchdown, and caught 4 passes for 40 yards. Sauer caught eight passes for 133 yards. Beverly became the first player in Super Bowl history to record two interceptions. Morrall had a terrible game—just 6 of 17 completions for 71 yards, with 3 interceptions. Through 58 games, he had the third worst passer rating in Super Bowl history, with a 9.3, one of only 3 ratings below 10. Despite not being put into the game until late in the third quarter, Unitas finished with more pass completions (11) and passing yards (110) than Morrall, but he also threw one interception. Matte was the Colts' top rusher with 116 yards on just 11 carries, an average of 10.5 yards per run, and caught 2 passes for 30 yards. The Colts were minus-4 in turnovers throwing four interceptions, all of which were deep in Jet territory.

=== Box score ===
Super Bowl III: New York Jets 16, Baltimore Colts 7

Quarter	1	2	3	4	Total
Jets (AFL)	0	7	6	3	16
Colts (NFL)	0	0	0	7	7

at Orange Bowl, Miami, Florida

- Date: January 12, 1969
- Game time: 3:05 p.m. EST
- Game weather: 73 °F (23 °C), overcast, windy, 20% chance of rain
- Game attendance: 75,389

Scoring summary

Quarter	Time	Drive			Team	Scoring information	Score	
Quarter	Time	Plays	Yards	TOP	Team	Scoring information	NYJ	BAL
2	9:03	12	80	5:06	NYJ	Matt Snell 4-yard touchdown run, Jim Turner kick good	7	0
3	10:08	8	8	4:17	NYJ	32-yard field goal by Turner	10	0
3	3:58	10	45	4:06	NYJ	30-yard field goal by Turner	13	0
4	13:26	7	61	3:58	NYJ	9-yard field goal by Turner	16	0
4	3:19	14	80	3:15	BAL	Jerry Hill 1-yard touchdown run, Lou Michaels kick good	16	7
"TOP" = time of possession. For other American football terms, see Glossary of American football.							16	7

== Postgame reactions ==
When Sal Marchiano asked Namath in the locker room if he was the "king of the hill", Namath replied "No, no, we're king of the hill. We got the team, brother". Morrall later said, "I thought we would win handily. We'd only lost twice in our last 30 games. I'm still not sure what happened that day at the Orange Bowl, however; it's still hard to account for." Snell wrote, "The most distinct image I have from that whole game is of Ordell Braase and some other guys—not so much Mike Curtis—having a bewildered look".

In 1983, Bubba Smith contended that the game had been fixed, saying "I knew something was wrong, you know, through the whole day, because if you look back at the films, we were inside the 20 five times in the first half and came away with no points".

In an interview for the series America's Game, Bill Curry, Mike Curtis, and Bubba Smith said they have never gotten over that loss and that they never will. Curtis said "It was one of the best teams I ever played with, and we lost to somebody that we would beat a thousand times after the Super Bowl. It was humiliation to be kind." After the game, the team went to what was supposed to be an automatic victory party at owner Carroll Rosenbloom's house where Curry said to Rosenbloom, "We will get back here and we will win. I promise."

== Final statistics ==
Sources: NFL.com Super Bowl III, Super Bowl III Play Finder NYJ, Super Bowl III Play Finder Bal

=== Statistical comparison ===
	New York Jets	Baltimore Colts
First downs	21	18
First downs rushing	10	7
First downs passing	10	9
First downs penalty	1	2
Third down efficiency	8/18	4/12
Fourth down efficiency	0/0	1/2
Net yards rushing	142	143
Rushing attempts	43	23
Yards per rush	3.3	6.2
Passing – Completions/attempts	17/29	17/41
Times sacked-total yards	2–11	0–0
Interceptions thrown	0	4
Net yards passing	195	181
Total net yards	337	324
Punt returns-total yards	1–0	4–34
Kickoff returns-total yards	1–25	4–105
Interceptions-total return yards	4–9	0–0
Punts-average yardage	4–38.8	3–44.3
Fumbles-lost	1–1	1–1
Penalties-total yards	5–28	3–23
Time of possession	36:10	23:50
Turnovers	1	5

=== Individual statistics ===
Jets passing
	C/ATT^{1}	Yds	TD	INT	Rating
Joe Namath	17/28	206	0	0	83.3
Babe Parilli	0/1	0	0	0	39.6
Jets rushing
	Car^{2}	Yds	TD	LG^{3}	Yds/Car
Matt Snell	30	121	1	12	4.03
Emerson Boozer	10	19	0	8	1.90
Bill Mathis	3	2	0	1	0.67
Jets receiving
	Rec^{4}	Yds	TD	LG^{3}	Target^{5}
George Sauer Jr.	8	133	0	39	12
Matt Snell	4	40	0	14	5
Bill Mathis	3	20	0	13	3
Pete Lammons	2	13	0	11	3
Don Maynard	0	0	0	0	5
Bake Turner	0	0	0	0	1

Colts passing
	C/ATT^{1}	Yds	TD	INT	Rating
Johnny Unitas	11/24	110	0	1	42.0
Earl Morrall	6/17	71	0	3	9.3
Colts rushing
	Car^{2}	Yds	TD	LG^{3}	Yds/Car
Tom Matte	11	116	0	58	10.55
Jerry Hill	9	29	1	12	3.22
Johnny Unitas	1	0	0	0	0.00
Earl Morrall	2	–2	0	0	–1.00
Colts receiving
	Rec^{4}	Yds	TD	LG^{3}	Target^{5}
Willie Richardson	6	58	0	21	15
Jimmy Orr	3	42	0	17	8
John Mackey	3	35	0	19	8
Tom Matte	2	30	0	30	3
Jerry Hill	2	1	0	1	4
Tom Mitchell	1	15	0	15	3

^{1}Completions/Attempts ^{2}Carries ^{3}Long gain ^{4}Receptions ^{5}Times targeted

Statistics provided by NFL.com

=== Records set ===
The following records were set or tied in Super Bowl III, according to the official NFL.com boxscore and the Pro-Football-Reference.com game summary. Some records have to meet NFL minimum number of attempts to be recognized. The minimums are shown (in parentheses).

Player records set in Super Bowl III
Passing records
Most attempts, without interception, game	28	Joe Namath (New York)
Most interceptions thrown, game	3	Earl Morrall (Baltimore)
Most interceptions thrown, career	3	Earl Morrall (Baltimore)
Rushing records
Most yards, game	121	Matt Snell (New York)
Most yards, career	121	Matt Snell (New York)
Most attempts, game	30	Matt Snell (New York)
Most attempts, career	30	Matt Snell (New York)
Highest average gain, career (20 attempts)	4.0 yards (121–30)	Matt Snell (New York)
Highest average gain, game (10 attempts)	10.5 yards (116–11)	Tom Matte (Baltimore)
Receiving records
Most receptions, game	8	George Sauer Jr. (New York)
Combined yardage records ^{†}
Most attempts, game	34	Matt Snell
Most attempts, career	34	Matt Snell
Most yards gained, game	146 yds	Tom Matte
Defense
Most interceptions, game	2	Randy Beverly (New York)
Most interceptions, career	2	Randy Beverly (New York)
Special teams
Most punt return yards gained, career	34 yards	Timmy Brown (Baltimore)
Highest average, punt return yardage, game (3 returns)	8.5 yards (4–34)	Timmy Brown (Baltimore)
Highest average, punt return yardage, career (4 returns)	8.5 yards (4–34)	Timmy Brown (Baltimore)
Most field goals attempted, game	5	Jim Turner (New York)
Most field goals attempted, career	5	Jim Turner (New York)
Records tied
Most completions, game	17	Joe Namath
Most receptions, career	8	George Sauer Jr.
Most fumbles, game	1	Tom Matte; George Sauer Jr.
Most fumbles, career	1	Tom Matte; George Sauer Jr.
Most fumbles recovered, game	1	Ron Porter (Baltimore); Ralph Baker (New York)
Most fumbles recovered, career	1	Ron Porter (Baltimore); Ralph Baker (New York)

- † This category includes rushing, receiving, interception returns, punt returns, kickoff returns, and fumble returns
- ‡ Sacks an official statistic since Super Bowl XVII by the NFL. Sacks are listed as "tackled attempting to pass" in the official NFL box score for Super Bowl III.

Team records set
Points
Fewest points, game	7	Colts
Fewest points, first half	0	Colts
Smallest margin of victory	9	Jets
Touchdowns, field goals
Fewest touchdowns, winning team	1	Jets
Most field goals attempted	5	Jets
Rushing
Most rushing attempts	43	Jets
Highest average gain per rush attempt	6.2 yards	Colts (143–23)
Lowest average gain per rush attempt	3.3 yards	Jets (142–43)
Passing
Most passing attempts	41	Colts
Lowest completion percentage (20 attempts)	41.4%	Colts (17–41)
Lowest average yards gained per pass attempt	4.4 yards	Colts (181–41)
Most times intercepted	4	Colts
Fewest times sacked	0	Colts
Fewest passing touchdowns	0	Colts; Jets
First downs
Most first downs, penalty	2	Colts
Defense
Most interceptions by	4	Jets
Fewest sacks, game	0	Jets
Most yards allowed in a win	337	Jets
Turnovers
Most turnovers, game	5	Colts
Kickoff returns
Fewest kickoff returns, game	1	Jets
Fewest yards gained, game	25	Jets
Highest average gain, game (3 returns)	26.3 yards	Colts (105–4)
Punting
Fewest punts, game	3	Colts
Lowest average, game (4 punts)	38.8 yards	Jets
Punt returns
Fewest punt returns, game	1	Jets
Fewest yards gained, game	0	Jets
Highest average return yardage, game (3 returns)	8.5 yards	Colts (34–4)
Penalties
Most penalties, game	5	Jets
Records tied
Most Super Bowl losses	1	Colts
Most points, fourth quarter	7	Colts
Fewest touchdowns, game	1	Colts; Jets
Most passes completed	17	Colts; Jets
Fewest times intercepted	0	Jets
Most first downs	21	Jets

Turnovers are defined as the number of times losing the ball on interceptions and fumbles.

Records set, both team totals
	Total	Jets	Colts
Points, both teams
Fewest points	23	16	7
Fewest points scored, first half	7	7	0
Fewest points scored, second half	16	9	7
Touchdowns, PATs, field goals, both teams
Fewest touchdowns	2	1	1
Fewest (one point) PATs	2	(1–1)	(1–1)
Most field goals attempted	7	5	2
Net yards, both teams
Most net yards, rushing and passing	661	337	324
Rushing, both teams
Most rushing attempts	66	43	23
Most rushing yards (net)	285	142	143
Passing, both teams
Most passing attempts	70	29	41
Most passes completed	34	17	17
Most times intercepted	4	0	4
Fewest times sacked	2	2	0
Fewest passing touchdowns	0	0	0
First downs, both teams
Most first downs	39	21	18
Most first downs rushing	17	10	7
Most first downs, penalty	3	1	2
Defense, both teams
Most interceptions by	4	4	0
Fewest sacks made	2	0	2
Turnovers, both teams
Most turnovers	6	1	5
Kickoff returns, both teams
Fewest kickoff returns	5	1	4
Fewest yards gained	130	25	105
Punting, both teams
Fewest punts, game	7	4	3
Punt returns, both teams
Fewest punt returns, game	5	1	4
Fewest yards gained, game	34	0	34
Records tied, both teams
Fewest fumbles	2	1	1
Most fumbles lost	2	1	1
Most penalties, game	8	5	3

== Starting lineups ==
Hall of Fame‡

New York	Position	Baltimore
Offense
George Sauer Jr.	SE	Jimmy Orr
Winston Hill‡	LT	Bob Vogel
Bob Talamini	LG	Glenn Ressler
John Schmitt	C	Bill Curry
Randy Rasmussen	RG	Dan Sullivan
Dave Herman	RT	Sam Ball
Pete Lammons	TE	John Mackey‡
Don Maynard‡	FL	Willie Richardson
Joe Namath‡	QB	Earl Morrall
Emerson Boozer	RB	Tom Matte
Matt Snell	RB	Jerry Hill
Defense
Gerry Philbin	LE	Bubba Smith
Paul Rochester	LT	Billy Ray Smith Sr.
John Elliott	RT	Fred Miller
Verlon Biggs	RE	Ordell Braase
Ralph Baker	LLB	Mike Curtis
Al Atkinson	MLB	Dennis Gaubatz
Larry Grantham	RLB	Don Shinnick
Johnny Sample	LCB	Bobby Boyd
Randy Beverly	RCB	Lenny Lyles
Jim Hudson	LS	Jerry Logan
Bill Baird	RS	Rick Volk

Starting lineup provided by NFL.com

== Officials ==
- Referee: Tom Bell (NFL) #7 first Super Bowl
- Umpire: Walt Parker (AFL) #25 first Super Bowl
- Head linesman: George Murphy (NFL) #30 first Super Bowl
- Line judge: Cal Lepore (AFL) #32 first Super Bowl
- Back judge: Jack Reader (AFL) #42 second Super Bowl (I)
- Field judge: Joe Gonzales (NFL) #54 first Super Bowl

Note: A seven-official system was not instituted until 1978.

Unlike the first two Super Bowls, officials wore their standard uniform. The AFL switched to the NFL uniform for 1968 in anticipation of the 1970 merger.

Jack Reader became the first official to work two Super Bowls. He was the only official to work two prior to the merger. He was promoted to referee in 1969.

== Aftermath ==
The following season, 1969, would be the last one before the AFL–NFL merger. As part of the merger, the Colts were one of three NFL teams that moved to the newly formed American Football Conference (AFC) with the Jets and the other AFL teams. The Jets and Colts became divisional rivals in the AFC East until the 2002 realignment shifted the Colts, who had moved to Indianapolis in 1984, to the new AFC South; the teams would however not meet in the playoffs until the 2002 season. Due to being in the same conference, a Super Bowl rematch is no longer possible unless the NFL radically changes its conference alignment and/or its playoff structure.

The Jets have not played in the Super Bowl since the merger, losing the AFC Championship Game in the 1982, 1998, 2009 and 2010 seasons. On the other hand, the Colts won Super Bowl V (1970), then after relocating to Indianapolis, won Super Bowl XLI (2006) and lost Super Bowl XLIV (2009).

However, teams representing Baltimore and New York have contested one Super Bowl since the merger: Super Bowl XXXV between the Jets' crosstown rival (the Giants) and Baltimore's replacement team (the Ravens), with the latter contest being won by Baltimore.

This was the first of three occasions in which a team from New York defeated one from Baltimore in postseason play during 1969, as the Knicks eliminated the Baltimore Bullets in the NBA playoffs before falling to the eventual NBA Champion Celtics in the Eastern Division finals. Then in baseball the Mets upset the heavily favored Orioles in the World Series. The Orioles and Mets seasons mirrored their NFL counterparts as the Orioles nabbed first place in the newly formed AL East for good on April 16 and would easily hold the lead for the rest of the season finishing 19 games ahead of the defending champion Detroit Tigers. Meanwhile, the Mets were in third place in the NL East and 10 games behind the Chicago Cubs only to finish 8 games ahead of the Cubs while winning the division.

The Colts and Orioles would achieve redemption the following year with the Orioles winning the 1970 World Series over the Cincinnati Reds. Four months later, the Colts defeated the Dallas Cowboys 16–13 in Super Bowl V.

This was also the last postseason victory for the Jets until they beat the Cincinnati Bengals in the 1982–83 playoffs.

Earl Morrall's performance has been rated as one of the worst in Super Bowl history, going 6-17 for 71 yards passing with 3 interceptions in 3 quarters of play and no points, including one interception thrown on the final play of the first half, with wide receiver Jimmy Orr wide open in the end zone. This was in sharp contrast to his performance during the regular season in which he was awarded MVP.

In his 1983 autobiography and in subsequent media interviews, Colts lineman Bubba Smith alleged that the game had been rigged to allow the Jets to win so the NFL–AFL merger would proceed smoothly. Smith (who died in 2011) never offered conclusive evidence to support his claims, and his charges were never corroborated by anyone. His old coach Don Shula flatly rejected them, accusing Smith of making them up to sensationalize his book, stating "The way I recall that Super Bowl is that everyone missed everybody all day long, including Bubba."

Baltimore defensive back Bobby Boyd, who retired after the Super Bowl to join the Colts coaching staff, remained bitter about the Super Bowl loss for the rest of his life. In a 2010 interview, he said "I had nightmares about it for a long time. Many a time, I'd wake up thinking, 'Why didn't we try this or that?' Then I'd get up, angry, drink a Coke, watch TV to calm down and then try to go back to sleep." Eventually, he said, the dreams stopped, "but I'll be thinking about that game to the day I die." He died in 2017.

== Bibliography ==
- Clary, Jack (1981). Pro Football's Great Moments (Updated ed.). New York, NY: Bonanza Books. ISBN 0-517-34584-6.
- Davis, Jeff (2008). Rozelle, Czar of the NFL. New York, NY: McGraw Hill. ISBN 978-0-07-147166-4.
- Hanks, Stephen (1988). The Game That Changed Pro Football. New York, NY: Carroll Publishing Group. ISBN 1-55972-012-3.
- Namath, Joe (2006). Namath (First ed.). New York, NY: Rugged Land. ISBN 978-1-59071-081-4.
- Rappoport, Ken (2010). The Little League that Could: A History of the American Football League. Lanham, MD: Taylor Trade Publishing. ISBN 978-1-58979-463-4.
- Sahadi, Lou (1969). The Long Pass: The Inside Story of the New York Jets from the Terrible Titans to Broadway Joe Namath and the Championship of 1968. New York, NY: The World Publishing Company. ISBN 978-1-58567-933-1.
