= List of NFL 99-yard pass plays =

Longest possible forward-passing play in American football

A 99-yard pass play is the longest play involving a forward pass that is possible in an American football game. It gains 99 yards and scores a touchdown for the offensive team. The play has occurred fourteen times in National Football League (NFL) history, most recently by Eli Manning and Victor Cruz of the New York Giants.

The Washington Commanders are the only team to have had multiple 99-yard passes, having done so three times. They were also the first franchise to complete one, accomplishing the feat in 1939. The Chicago Bears are the only team to have given up multiple 99-yard passes, doing so three times. Teams that have had a 99-yard pass play are 11–3 in the game it occurred in.

In addition to 99-yard pass plays, there have been two 99-yard running plays, by Tony Dorsett and Derrick Henry.

== Details ==
A 99-yard pass play starts with the line of scrimmage at the offensive team's one-yard line. The quarterback receives the ball, passes it and completes a forward pass, which is then carried for a touchdown at the other end of the field.

This play is a high-risk play, since the pass is coming from in or near the offensive team's end zone. If the ball is intercepted, the opposing team will likely either score a touchdown or have great field position, and a sack can result in a safety or even a touchdown for the defense. A safety can also occur if a holding or intentional grounding penalty occurs in the end zone or the quarterback accidentally steps or runs out of the back of the end zone.

== Occurrences ==
Fourteen 99-yard pass plays have occurred in NFL history.

Passer	Receiver	Team	Opponent	Game result	Date	Details
Frank Filchock	Andy Farkas	Washington Redskins	Pittsburgh Pirates	W 44–14	October 15, 1939	"Filchock flipped a pass from the end zone to Farkas, who gathered it on the ten for a stirring 90 yard jaunt to the goal behind perfect blocking by his mates."
Otto Graham	Mac Speedie	Cleveland Browns	Buffalo Bills	W 28–7	November 2, 1947	"Speedie’s standout career-play came in 1948 when he caught a screen pass from Otto Graham and ran 99 yards for a touchdown against the Buffalo Bills."
George Izo	Bobby Mitchell	Washington Redskins	Cleveland Browns	L 37–14	September 15, 1963	"Izo had faded into the end zone and fired high and long. Mitchell ... caught the ball around midfield and scampered untouched for a touchdown."
Karl Sweetan	Pat Studstill	Detroit Lions	Baltimore Colts	L 45–14	October 16, 1966	"Studstill ... gathered in the pass at the Lions 45 on a dead run and raced on to pay dirt."
Sonny Jurgensen	Gerry Allen	Washington Redskins	Chicago Bears	W 38–28	September 15, 1968	Allen caught the ball at the Washington 35 and ran the remaining 65 yards
Jim Plunkett	Cliff Branch	Los Angeles Raiders	Washington Redskins	L 37–35	October 2, 1983	Branch caught the ball at the Raiders' 35 and ran the remaining 64 yards for the score.
Ron Jaworski	Mike Quick	Philadelphia Eagles	Atlanta Falcons	W 23–17 _{(OT)}	November 10, 1985	"Jaworski hit Quick ...at about the 20. Quick ran the 80 yards for the score."
Stan Humphries	Tony Martin	San Diego Chargers	Seattle Seahawks	W 24–10	September 18, 1994	Martin caught the ball at the 35, and with Patrick Hunter pursuing him, ran the remaining 65 yards to score.
Brett Favre	Robert Brooks	Green Bay Packers	Chicago Bears	W 27–24	September 11, 1995	On Monday Night Football, Favre pump-faked a quick post pattern to Robert Brooks, who then ran an up-route that left Donnell Woolford behind. Brooks caught the ball at the Green Bay 32 and ran the remaining 68 yards untouched for the touchdown to put the Packers up 21–0 in the second quarter.
Trent Green	Marc Boerigter	Kansas City Chiefs	San Diego Chargers	W 24–22	December 22, 2002	Green took the snap and retreated deep into the Chiefs' end zone, then stepped up and heaved the ball toward Boerigter, a rookie receiver who was streaking down the middle. Boerigter took the ball in perfect stride at the Kansas City 40 and outran Rogers Beckett the remaining 60 yards.
Jeff Garcia	André Davis	Cleveland Browns	Cincinnati Bengals	W 34–17	October 17, 2004	Davis was near the Browns' 40-yard line when he caught the pass from Garcia.
Gus Frerotte	Bernard Berrian	Minnesota Vikings	Chicago Bears	W 34–14	November 30, 2008	Berrian caught the ball at the Vikings' 46 and ran the remaining 54 yards to score.
Tom Brady	Wes Welker	New England Patriots	Miami Dolphins	W 38–24	September 12, 2011	Brady lofted a pass to Welker at the 17 from 7 yards deep in the end zone. Welker then stiff-armed defender Benny Sapp on his 83-yard sprint into the end zone.
Eli Manning	Victor Cruz	New York Giants	New York Jets	W 29–14	December 24, 2011	Manning threw a pass to Cruz at the 11, which was followed by Cruz avoiding 3 tackles while running down the right sideline to score a touchdown.

== See also ==
- List of NFL individual records
- List of NFL team records
