= Bob Talamini =

American football player (1939–2022)

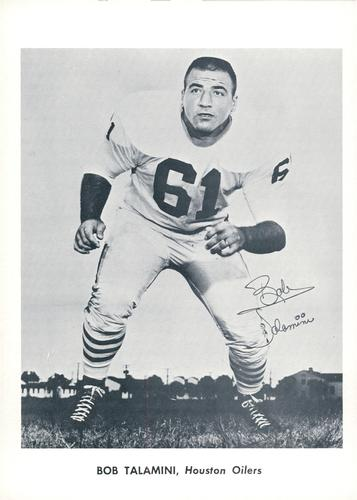

No. 61
- Position: Guard

Personal information
- Born: January 8, 1939; Louisville, Kentucky, U.S.
- Died: May 30, 2022 (aged 83); Las Cruces, New Mexico, U.S.
- Listed height: 6 ft 1 in (1.85 m)
- Listed weight: 255 lb (116 kg)

Career information
- College: Kentucky
- AFL draft: 1960

Career history
- Houston Oilers (1960–1967); New York Jets (1968)

Awards and highlights
- Super Bowl champion (III); 3× AFL champion (1960, 1961, 1968); 3× First-team All-AFL (1963, 1965, 1967); 4× Second-team All-AFL (1961, 1962, 1964, 1966); AFL All-Time 2nd Team; 6× AFL All-Star (1962–1967)

Career statistics
- Games played: 126
- Stats at Pro Football Reference

Robert Guy Talamini (January 8, 1939 – May 30, 2022) was an American professional football player who was a guard in the American Football League (AFL). He played college football for the Kentucky Wildcats, earning third-team All-SEC honors. He was selected by the Houston Oilers of the American Football League (AFL). His professional career began with the AFL's first training camp in 1960, and was capped the day the New York Jets stunned the NFL's Baltimore Colts in Super Bowl III on January 12, 1969. He was named first- or second-team All-AFL during the majority of his playing years.

== Early life ==
Talamini was born on January 8, 1939, in Louisville, Kentucky. He attended St. Xavier High School in Louisville, where he was a standout on the football team playing guard, tackle and fullback. He weighed 160 to 170 pounds (72.6–77.1 kg) during his senior year in 1955. He was selected to replace a teammate in an East-West high school all-star game held in Lexington, Kentucky in August 1956. Up to that point he had not received any college football scholarship offers. After being impressed by Talamini's play in the all-star game, University of Kentucky Wildcats head coach Blanton Collier offered Talamini a scholarship.

== College career ==
By his junior year, Talamini was a starting guard at Kentucky, and played more minutes than any other Wildcat football player during the 1958 season; even though he weighed only 192 pounds (87.1 kg) going into the season. By the time of his senior year (1959), Talamini weighed 215 pounds (97.5 kg). After his senior year, the Associated Press (AP) selected Talamini as third-team All-Southeastern Conference at guard.

== Professional career ==
=== Houston Oilers ===
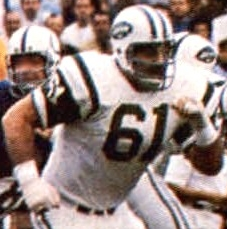
Talamini playing for the Jets in Super Bowl III

The Houston Oilers of the newly formed American Football League (AFL) selected Talamini in the second round of the 1960 AFL draft. He played his entire eight-year career in the AFL, before the merger of the AFL with the National Football League (NFL).

Talamini played for the Houston Oilers from 1960 to 1967. The Oilers won the AFL championship in both 1960 and 1961, and lost the 1962 championship in double-overtime to the Dallas Texans, 20–17 (the second longest game in AFL/NFL history). Talamini started eight games at left guard in 1960 and all 14 games at left guard in 1961. He started every Oilers' game at left guard from 1962 through 1967, and was selected to the AFL All-Star game each of those years. The Associated Press (AP) named Talamini first-team All-AFL in 1963, 1965 and 1967, and second-team All-AFL in 1964. United Press International (UPI) named him first-team All-AFL three times and second-team All-AFL three times, and The Sporting News named him first-team All-AFL from 1962 to 1967.

The Oilers championship teams included Professional Football Hall of Fame quarterback George Blanda, who played behind Talamini from 1960 through 1966. Like Talamini, Blanda attended the University of Kentucky. His Oiler teammates also included Heisman Trophy winner and College Football Hall of Fame inductee Billy Cannon, who played in the backfield behind Talamini from 1960 through 1963. Talamini played alongside three-time AFL All-Star center Bob Schmidt (1961–63), three time second-team All-AFL left tackle Walter Suggs (1963–67), and two time AFL All-Star right tackle Rich Michael (1960–63, 1965–66), anchoring an offensive line that gave Blanda time to set passing records that would last for decades and opened holes for running backs like Cannon, Charlie Tolar, Sid Blanks and Hoyle Granger to run through.

After participating in the AFL's first three championship games, the Oilers rapidly declined. The Oilers record fell to 6–8 in 1963. In 1964, coach Pop Ivy was replaced by Hall of Fame quarterback Sammy Baugh, but the team's record fell again to 4–10. Hugh Taylor replaced Baugh in 1965, but the team was once more 4–10. Wally Lemm replaced Taylor, with a 3–11 record in 1966. In 1967, the team moved on from the 40-year old Blanda, and went 9–4–1 under Lemm. Talamini reached the AFL championship game one final time with the Oilers in 1967, losing to the Oakland Raiders, 40–7.

=== New York Jets ===
Talamini held out before the 1968 season, and did not report to the Oilers training camp. The Oilers traded him to the New York Jets in August 1968, for a third round draft choice. Talamini played in 14 games for the Jets that season, but was called upon to start eight of the team's final nine games at left guard, after starting left guard Randy Rasmussen was injured.

With the Jets, Talamini blocked for future Hall of Fame quarterback Joe Namath and running backs Matt Snell and Emerson Boozer. The team won the 1968 AFL championship, and then went on to defeat the Baltimore Colts in Super Bowl III. Rasmussen made it back for the Super Bowl, but Talamini remained at starting left guard because of an injury to lineman Sam Walton. In the Super Bowl, the Jets gained 142 total rushing yards, with 121 by Snell, rushing chiefly to the left side behind the blocking of Talamini and left tackle Winston Hill against the right side of the Colts' defensive line (Ordell Braase and Fred Miller). The effectiveness of this rushing strategy was the key to the Jets winning the game. Namath said years later, "Without Talamini, we don't win [the Super Bowl] . . . Maybe we don't even get there. But we don't win without Bob Talamini."

== Legacy and honors ==
Talamini was selected to the All-Time All-AFL second-team, and was named to the AFL's 1960s All-Decade Team (second-team) by the Hall of Fame. During his career, Talamini played in 126 games, and started in 110 consecutive games.

In 2011, he was inducted in the Kentucky Pro Football Hall of Fame.

Talamini, Don Floyd and Jim Norton were the last of the original Oilers.

== Personal life ==
After retiring from football, Talamini worked in the financial consulting business with thousands of clients. He was president of the NFL Alumni Association. He was also president of the Houston Touchdown Club. Talamini lived with his wife in Las Cruces, New Mexico until his death.

== Death ==
Talamini died on May 30, 2022, at the age of 83, in New Mexico. He was survived by his wife Mary Will, seven children, 14 grandchildren and 10 great-grandchildren.

== See also ==
- Other American Football League players
