= Winston Hill =

American football player (1941–2016)

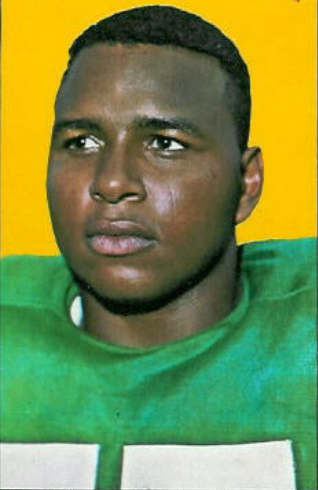
- Hill on a Topps card, 1966

No. 75, 73
- Position: Offensive tackle

Personal information
- Born: October 23, 1941; Joaquin, Texas, U.S.
- Died: April 26, 2016 (aged 74); Denver, Colorado, U.S.
- Listed height: 6 ft 4 in (1.93 m)
- Listed weight: 270 lb (122 kg)

Career information
- High school: Weldon (Gladewater, Texas)
- College: Texas Southern
- NFL draft: 1963: 11th round, 145th overall pick

Career history
- New York Jets (1963–1976); Miami Dolphins (1977)*; Los Angeles Rams (1977)
- * Offseason or practice squad member only

Awards and highlights
- Super Bowl champion (III); AFL champion (1968); First-team All-AFL (1969); Second-team All-AFL (1968); 4× Pro Bowl (1970–1973); 4× AFL All-Star (1964, 1967–1969); AFL All-Time Second-team; New York Jets Ring of Honor

Career NFL/AFL statistics
- Games played: 198
- Games started: 182
- Fumble recoveries: 4
- Stats at Pro Football Reference
- Pro Football Hall of Fame

Winston Cordell Hill (October 23, 1941 – April 26, 2016) was an American professional football player who was an offensive tackle in the American Football League (AFL) and National Football League (NFL), primarily with the New York Jets. He played college football for the Texas Southern Tigers.

== Early life and college ==
Hill grew up in Joaquin, Texas. His father, Garfield Hill, served as principal of Weldon High School in Gladewater, Texas. Winston was a tennis champion in high school. He played both offensive and defensive line in college at Texas Southern University and was an All-American.

== Professional career ==
Hill was selected by the Baltimore Colts in the 11th round of the 1963 NFL draft. He signed as a free agent with New York's American Football League franchise in the same year that they became the New York Jets, and went on to record the tenth-longest string of starts in pro football history at 174. As left offensive tackle for the Jets, he spent his career protecting Joe Namath's blind side and opening holes for the likes of Emerson Boozer, Matt Snell and John Riggins. He was an American Football League All-Star in 1964, 1967, 1968 and 1969, and a Pro Bowl selection in 1970, 1971, 1972 and 1973. He and Joe Namath joined the Los Angeles Rams in 1977; Namath retired after one season and Hill after three games. On January 15, 2020, Hill was inducted to the Pro Football Hall of Fame Class of 2020, and is in the Class of 2021 for the Black College Football Hall of Fame.

=== 1968 season and Super Bowl III ===
Hill was an overpowering blocker who was instrumental in opening gaping holes for Jet running backs during the 1968 season, in which they won the Eastern division title with 11 wins and 3 losses and gained as a team 1,608 yards rushing and 3,574 yards passing. Hill also starred in the Third Professional AFL-NFL World Championship Game (Super Bowl III), as the Jets decimated the right side of the Baltimore Colts' defensive line with Ordell Braase at end against Hill and Fred Miller at tackle against Bob Talamini, so that Matt Snell gained 121 yards rushing in the Jets' 16–7 upset victory.

== Special recognition ==
In 1970 Hill was selected by a panel of members of the AFL's Hall of Fame Board of Selectors to the second-team All-time All-American Football League Team. He was a member of the New York Jets' All-Time Four Decade Team, which was determined by the fans in 2003. Hill was a 1986 inductee into the Texas Southern University Sports Hall of Fame.

The 2009 NFL season was the 50th season for the eight original AFL teams, and that anniversary was commemorated throughout the season with 16 "AFL Legacy Games." One of those games, pitting the NY Jets against the Miami Dolphins, took place in New York on Sunday November 1; designated by the NFL as "Winston Hill Day". Hill's daughter, opera singer Heather Hill, opened the game by singing the national anthem, and fifteen of Hill's former teammates and other ex-Jets joined the festivities. As part of the celebration, Hill's jersey, #75, was retired during the halftime ceremonies.

On Monday August 16, 2010, during halftime of the first game played at the New Meadowlands Stadium (a preseason opener; Jets vs. Giants), Hill was inducted into the Jets Ring of Honor. This selection was made by an internal committee led by Jets Chairman and CEO Woody Johnson.

On January 15, 2020, Hill was elected to the Pro Football Hall of Fame Class of 2020. The following year he was inducted into the Black College Football Hall of Fame in Atlanta, GA over the Juneteenth weekend. The BCHOF has a permanent residence in Canton, OH. Hill will be honored posthumously over Labor Day weekend in Canton, OH.

== Later life ==
Hill was a 46-year Colorado resident. During that time he became known for his generous nature and philanthropic community based activities. He was an ardent supporter of youth programs and brought campers to the Joe Namath, John Dockery football camp until he was no longer able to travel. He collaborated with fellow athletes and was often the only non Bronco invited to Bronco parties when he was in town.

Hill worked with the Gilliam Youth Center in Denver and was a major supporter of restorative justice. He volunteered for years at the Denver Indian Center and got fellow pro athletes, Broncos and Nuggets to donate sporting equipment and to volunteer time at youth camps. He was a motivational speaker for the Fellowship of Christian Athletes and spoke nationally for twenty years.

Concerning the NFL, Hill was an active member of the Alumni Players Association and was an insistent advocate in two areas: Financial education for players and health care equal to the needs of retired football players, many who suffered from injuries sustained during years as a player. Financially, he had great concern surrounding young players coming in and receiving massive salaries without the information and wisdom needed to negotiate or handle their income responsibly. His most pressing passion was advocating for player's health. Prior to and during the years that concussive brain syndrome was coming into the spotlight, Hill had annually discussed the need for better healthcare provisions for retired players. Players, especially the older ones, whose careers preceded the super salaries of today, often did not have the funds nor the means to travel to their home team headquarters to request support with their increasing health concerns. The year after Hill died, 2017 at the annual Jets Alumni meeting held at the Atlantic Health Training Center, leadership discussed the changes that were in place and detailed a list of supports to answer the call for proper medical treatment. Daughter Heather Hill stated, "Winston went to the mountain top, but was not able to cross over. Still, his persistence was a voice of change and action that has brought us to this day."

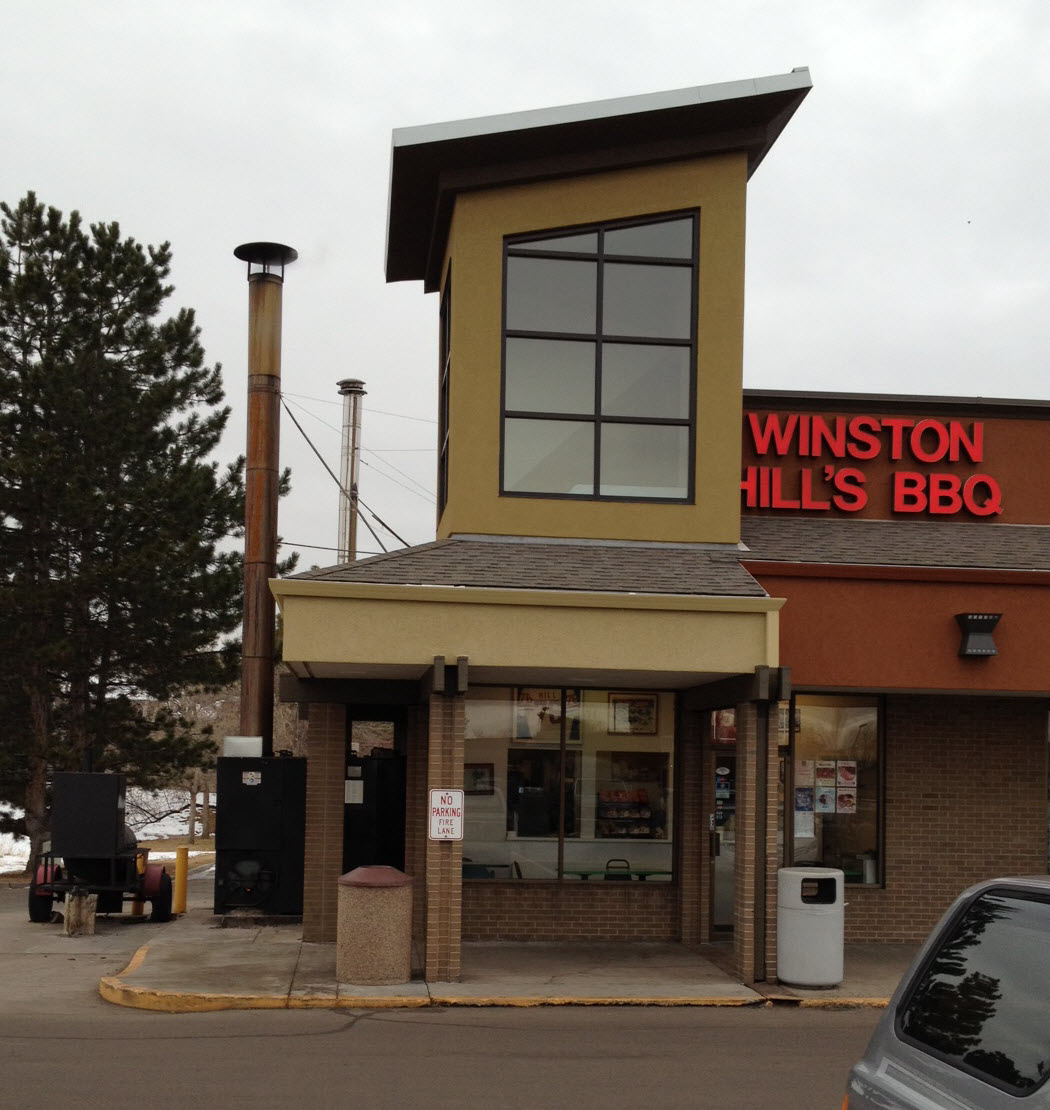
Winston Hill's BBQ

Hill opened his first barbecue restaurant in 1980 after apprenticing under the legendary Five Points community leader, Daddy Bruce Randolph. One of his restaurants in the 1980s was on Colorado Blvd. across the street from the University Hospital.Over the years he became involved in several restaurant ventures but his favorite location was a little take out his family still runs to this day. Hill brought a smoker and his cooking talents to Centennial, Colorado, in the early 1990s and opened Winston Hill's BBQ or Winston Hill's Ribs & Stuff; now called Winston's Smoke BBQ. As of February 2023, the location has since closed permanently.

His daughters, Heather Hill, singer/actress and Hovlyn May, educator, began the Winston Hill Finish Like a Pro Athletic Endowed Scholarship at Texas Southern University aimed at juniors and seniors needing help to finish "like pros" in the fields of physical education, sports medicine, physical therapy, neurological sciences.

== Death ==
Hill died on April 26, 2016, at the age of 74. He died of congestive heart failure and concussive brain syndrome. At his request his brain was donated to science to further the research on brain injuries suffered by athletes.

== See also ==
- Other American Football League players
