= Gerry Allen =

American football player (born 1941)

No. 44, 20
- Position: Running back

Personal information
- Born: June 26, 1941 (age 85); Canton, Ohio, U.S.
- Listed height: 6 ft 1 in (1.85 m)
- Listed weight: 200 lb (91 kg)

Career information
- High school: Massillon Washington (Massillon, Ohio)
- College: Nebraska-Omaha (1962–1965)
- NFL draft: 1966: 8th round, 120th overall pick
- AFL draft: 1966: 11th round, 93rd overall pick

Career history
- Baltimore Colts (1966); Washington Redskins (1967–1969)

Awards and highlights
- NFL record: Longest receiving touchdown: 99 yards (tied)

Career NFL statistics
- Rushing yards: 664
- Rushing average: 3.3
- Receptions: 33
- Receiving yards: 400
- Total touchdowns: 9
- Stats at Pro Football Reference

Gerald Allen (born June 26, 1941) is an American former professional football player who was a running back in the National Football League (NFL) for the Washington Redskins and Baltimore Colts.

== Biography ==
He was born in Canton, Ohio. He played college football at the University of Omaha (now the University of Nebraska-Omaha) and was selected in the eighth round of the 1966 NFL draft. Allen was also picked in the eleventh round of the 1966 AFL draft by the New York Jets. As of 2011, he is tied with eleven players for the longest career reception: a 99-yard pass play from Hall of Fame quarterback Sonny Jurgensen during a September 15, 1968, game against the Chicago Bears.
