= Karl Sweetan =

American football player (1942–2000)

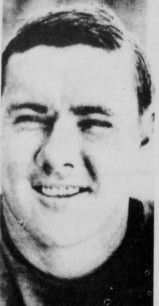

No. 18, 14, 10
- Position: Quarterback

Personal information
- Born: October 2, 1942; Dallas, Texas, U.S.
- Died: July 2, 2000 (aged 57); Las Vegas, Texas, U.S.
- Listed height: 6 ft 1 in (1.85 m)
- Listed weight: 203 lb (92 kg)

Career information
- High school: South Oak Cliff (Dallas)
- College: Texas A&M (1961); Wake Forest (1963)
- NFL draft: 1965: 18th round, 249th overall pick

Career history
- Toronto Argonauts (1964); Detroit Lions (1966–1967); New Orleans Saints (1968); Los Angeles Rams (1969–1970); Edmonton Eskimos (1972)*
- * Offseason or practice squad member only

Awards and highlights
- Longest touchdown pass: 99 yards (tied)

Career NFL statistics
- Passing attempts: 590
- Passing completions: 269
- Completion percentage: 45.6%
- TD–INT: 17–34
- Passing yards: 3,210
- Passer rating: 48.3
- Rushing yards: 306
- Rushing touchdowns: 2
- Stats at Pro Football Reference

Karl Robert Sweetan (Pronounced: Swee-TAN) (October 2, 1942 – July 2, 2000) was an American professional football player who was a quarterback for five seasons in the National Football League (NFL) from 1966 to 1970 with three teams. He played college football for the Texas A&M Aggies and Wake Forest Demon Deacons.

== Early life ==
Sweetan grew up in Dallas and graduated from South Oak Cliff High School in 1961.

== College career ==
Sweetan played football at Navarro Junior College and Texas A&M before transferring to Wake Forest.

Sweetan was Wake Forest's starting quarterback in 1963, his senior year. He completed 79 of 218 passes for 674 yards, throwing one touchdown and 18 interceptions. His 218 pass attempts were the second highest in the conference, and fifth highest in the country.

== Professional career ==
Undrafted by the National Football League out of college, Sweetan played quarterback and defensive back for the Canadian Football League’s Toronto Argonauts during the 1964 season. In the 1965 NFL draft, he was an 18th round draft choice of the Detroit Lions.

During his first season, in 1966, he replaced an injured Milt Plum in an October 16 game against the Baltimore Colts. In that game, Sweetan threw a 99-yard pass to Pat Studstill that will always be an NFL record for longest pass completion. Sweetan was the second NFL quarterback to accomplish the feat; as of 2021, a total of 12 NFL quarterbacks have thrown a 99-yard pass, with the most recent being Eli Manning in 2011.

Sweetan played himself in the 1967 movie, Paper Lion, which starred Alan Alda as an amateur participating at quarterback during the Lions preseason (based on an actual experience by the writer George Plimpton).

Sweetan gained a different kind of notoriety when it was alleged that he tried to sell an NFL football playbook to another team; however, the charge was not proven.

== Personal life ==
Sweetan spent the last 27 years of his life in Las Vegas, where he worked for a series of casinos; his last job was as a baccarat dealer at the Las Vegas Hilton. He was survived by four daughters and a son.

According to a 1966 article in the Detroit Jewish News, Sweetan said he was Jewish.
