= Willie Walker (American football) =

American football player (born 1942)

No. 40
- Position: Wide receiver

Personal information
- Born: September 15, 1942 (age 84); Anguilla, Mississippi, U.S.
- Listed height: 6 ft 3 in (1.91 m)
- Listed weight: 200 lb (91 kg)

Career information
- College: Tennessee State
- NFL draft: 1966: 4th round, 59th overall pick

Career history
- Detroit Lions (1966)
- Stats at Pro Football Reference

Willie Walker (born September 15, 1942) is an American former professional football player who was a wide receiver for the Detroit Lions of the National Football League (NFL). He played college football for the Tennessee State Tigers.
