= Paul Rochester =

American football player (1938–2020)

No. 72, 73
- Position: Defensive tackle

Personal information
- Born: July 15, 1938; Lansing, Michigan, U.S.
- Died: June 7, 2020 (aged 81); Jacksonville, Florida, U.S.
- Listed height: 6 ft 2 in (1.88 m)
- Listed weight: 255 lb (116 kg)

Career information
- High school: Sewanhaka (NY)
- College: Michigan State
- NFL draft: 1960: undrafted

Career history
- Dallas Texans/Kansas City Chiefs (1960–1963); New York Jets (1964–1969)

Awards and highlights
- AFL All-Star (1961); 2× AFL champion (1962, 1968); Super Bowl champion (III)

Career NFL statistics
- Games played: 132
- Fumble recoveries: 2
- Sacks: 1
- Stats at Pro Football Reference

Paul "Rocky" Rochester (July 15, 1938 – June 7, 2020) was an American professional football player who was a defensive tackle in the American Football League (AFL). He played for the Dallas Texans/Kansas City Chiefs (1960–1963) and the New York Jets (1964–1969). He played college football at Michigan State University.

He was an AFL All-Star in 1961, and he earned an AFL Championship ring with the New York Jets in 1968 and had the only sack of the game; as well as a World Championship with the Jets after the 1968 season, when he was team co-captain in the Jets' upset of the heavily favored NFL Champion Baltimore Colts. Rochester is one of only twenty players who played the entire ten years of the AFL's existence.

== See also ==
- Other American Football League players
