= Johnnie Robinson =

American football player (born 1944)

No. 49
- Position: Defensive back

Personal information
- Born: November 6, 1944 (age 82); Mobile, Alabama, U.S.
- Listed height: 6 ft 3 in (1.91 m)
- Listed weight: 205 lb (93 kg)

Career information
- High school: St. Elmo
- College: Tennessee State
- NFL draft: 1966: 7th round, 103rd overall pick

Career history
- Detroit Lions (1966)
- Stats at Pro Football Reference

Johnnie Robinson (born November 6, 1944) is an American former professional football player who was a defensive back for the Detroit Lions of the National Football League (NFL). He played college football for the Tennessee State Tigers.
