= Daddy Bruce Randolph =

Barbecue pitmaster and philanthropist in Denver, CO (1900-1994)

Daddy Bruce Randolph, Sr.
- Born: February 15, 1900; Pastoria, Arkansas
- Died: March 19, 1994 (aged 94); Denver, Colorado
- Occupations: Barbecue pitmaster and philanthropist
- Children: Bruce Randolph, Jr.

Daddy Bruce Randolph, Sr. (February 15, 1900 – March 19, 1994) was a barbecue pitmaster and philanthropist most known for his works in Denver, Colorado. He owned Daddy Bruce's B-B-Q in Denver, and the street outside his restaurant in Five Points was renamed in his honor. Randolph was best known for his food giveaways, including the Thanksgiving Dinner Giveaway that fed thousands of people each year.

== Biography ==
Bruce Randolph, Sr. was born on February 15, 1900, in Pastoria, Arkansas. His parents were Tommie and Josephine Randolph. He was the sixth of seven children. Randolph left school after third grade and picked up odd jobs like picking cotton, working in a mine, and collecting bills for his uncle's medical practice.

Randolph's paternal grandmother, Laura Hart, was formerly enslaved and taught Randolph about the barbecue craft. After his parents separated when he was a child, he spent more time with his grandmother and other family members.

At age 15, Randolph moved to Little Rock, Arkansas, to work in the Bauxite Mine. At age 19, he moved back to Pastoria where he started selling barbecue sandwiches. In 1933, Randolph moved to Pampa, Texas, where he started a restaurant, a taxi service, and a liquor store. When his second wife filed for divorce, Randolph moved to Tucson, Arizona, where he started another restaurant which failed.

=== Denver ===
Randolph's son, Bruce Randolph Jr., moved to Denver and worked in a barber shop. Randolph followed his son to Denver in 1960. Randolph had little money after his divorce and failed restaurants, so he became a janitor until he could purchase a large smoker.

Randolph got a loan from a bank in Englewood for $1000, which he used to start a portable barbecue business. Randolph and his son took the "barbecue pit on wheels" around Denver and eventually earned enough money to start a permanent restaurant. Daddy Bruce's Bar-B-Q opened its first location in Five Points.

Randolph became the official caterer of the Denver Broncos. He traveled with them to the 1978 Super Bowl.

=== Philanthropy ===
Randolph was inspired by the Biblical story of Jesus feeding 5,000 followers with fish and bread. He wanted to feed his community, and held many holiday events where he fed the community for free.

In 1967, Randolph began a tradition of giving away meals on Thanksgiving. He gave away a truckload of food to people in City Park, and fed a few hundred people. The event grew through the 1970s, until in 1980, he fed 5,000 people. The next year, he served 8,000 people, and 15,000 in the year after that. He became a landmark in Denver, and other organizations started donating clothing he distributed to people who lacked warm clothes in the winter.

The city renamed E 34th Ave. "Bruce Randolph Boulevard" in 1985. By 1989, his restaurant was shut down by the state for unpaid taxes. KDKO radio station held a fundraiser to repay the debt and keep him in business. They raised $4,000, and the restaurant was open for four more years.

One of Randolph's proteges was former New York Jets player Winston Hill. Randolph taught his barbecue secrets, and Hill owned a restaurant in Centennial that preserves his recipes and legacy.

=== Personal life ===
Bruce Randolph, Sr. married Queen Ester Wilkerson in 1924. They had one child together, Bruce Randolph, Jr. Queen Ester died in 1932 from a heart attack.

Bruce Randolph, Jr. started the nickname "Daddy Bruce" for his father. He had a second wife.

=== Death and legacy ===
Bruce Randolph, Sr. died on March 19, 1994, of pneumonia. Hundreds of people attended his funeral in Denver.

== Recognition ==
In November 1985, the city renamed the street in Five Points where his restaurant once stood in his honor for his humanitarianism. Mayor Federico Peña and U.S. Representative Patricia Schroeder were in attendance at the ceremony. Randolph received a letter of commendation from then-President Ronald Reagan.

In 2002, Rev. Ronald Wooding founded the Bruce Randolph Legacy Foundation. The foundation still holds Thanksgiving Dinner Giveaways to feed hundreds of families in Denver. The foundation has two awards each year, including the "Be Bruce" award and the "Tamara Banks Media Award."

In 2010, a school was named in his honor, the Bruce Randolph School.

In 2020, Wooding produced a documentary called "Keep a Light in Your Window" that follows the life of Randolph.

== Bibliography ==
- Grant, Billie Arlene and James H. Brown. Daddy Bruce Randolph : the Pied Piper of Denver. Accent Advantage 1986. ISBN 9780961242800
