= American Football League All-Time Team =

Official list of the American Football League's best players

The American Football League (AFL) All-Time Team was selected on January 14, 1970. The first and second teams were determined by a panel of members of the AFL's Hall of Fame Board of Selectors:

== Offense ==
*	Elected into the Pro Football Hall of Fame	¤	~	Hall of Fame Finalist

Position	First Team	Hall of Fame? (Note: Players who have been inducted into the Pro Football Hall of Fame in Canton, Ohio)	Second Team	Hall of Fame?
Quarterback	Joe Namath* (New York Jets)	Yes	Len Dawson* (Dallas Texans/Kansas City Chiefs)	Yes
Running back	Paul Lowe (Los Angeles/San Diego Chargers)	No	Abner Haynes (Dallas Texans/Kansas City Chiefs, Denver Broncos, New York Jets)	No
Running back	Clem Daniels (Oakland Raiders)	No	Cookie Gilchrist (Buffalo Bills, Denver Broncos, Miami Dolphins)	No
Wide receiver	Lance Alworth* (San Diego Chargers)	Yes	Charlie Hennigan (Houston Oilers)	No
Wide receiver	Don Maynard* (New York Jets)	Yes	Art Powell (New York Titans, Oakland Raiders, Buffalo Bills)	1 time finalist
Tight end	Fred Arbanas (Kansas City Chiefs)	No	Dave Kocourek (Los Angeles/San Diego Chargers, Miami Dolphins, Oakland Raiders)	No
Tackle	Ron Mix* (San Diego Chargers)	Yes	Winston Hill* (New York Jets)	Yes
Tackle	Jim Tyrer ~ (Kansas City Chiefs)	2 time finalist	Stew Barber (Buffalo Bills)	No
Guard	Billy Shaw* (Buffalo Bills)	Yes	Walt Sweeney (San Diego Chargers)	No
Guard	Ed Budde (Kansas City Chiefs)	No	Bob Talamini (Houston Oilers, New York Jets)	No
Center	Jim Otto* (Oakland Raiders)	Yes	Jon Morris (Boston Patriots)	No

== Defense ==
Position	First Team	Hall of Fame?	Second Team	Hall of Fame?
Defensive end	Jerry Mays (Kansas City Chiefs)	No	Rich Jackson (Denver Broncos)	No
Defensive end	Gerry Philbin (New York Jets)	No	Ron McDole (Buffalo Bills, Houston Oilers)	No
Defensive tackle	Tom Sestak (Buffalo Bills)	No	Buck Buchanan* (Kansas City Chiefs)	Yes
Defensive tackle	Houston Antwine (Boston Patriots)	No	Tom Keating (Oakland Raiders, Buffalo Bills)	No
Linebacker	Nick Buoniconti* (Boston Patriots, Miami Dolphins)	Yes	Dan Conners (Oakland Raiders)	No
Linebacker	Bobby Bell* (Kansas City Chiefs)	Yes	Larry Grantham (New York Titans/Jets)	No
Linebacker	George Webster (Houston Oilers)	No	Mike Stratton (Buffalo Bills)	No
Cornerback	Willie Brown* (Denver Broncos, Oakland Raiders)	Yes	Butch Byrd (Buffalo Bills)	No
Cornerback	Dave Grayson (Kansas City Chiefs, Oakland Raiders)	No	Miller Farr (Denver Broncos, San Diego Chargers, Houston Oilers)	No
Safety	Johnny Robinson* (Kansas City Chiefs)	Yes	Goose Gonsoulin (Denver Broncos)	No
Safety	George Saimes (Buffalo Bills)	No	Kenny Graham (San Diego Chargers)	No

== Special teams ==
Position	First Team	Hall of Fame?	Second Team	Hall of Fame?
Kicker	George Blanda* (Houston Oilers, Oakland Raiders)	Yes	Jim Turner (New York Jets, Denver Broncos)	No
Punter	Jerrel Wilson (Kansas City Chiefs)	No	Bob Scarpitto (San Diego Chargers, Denver Broncos, Boston Patriots)	No

== Coach ==
Position	First Team	Hall of Fame?	Second Team	Hall of Fame?
Coach	Weeb Ewbank* (New York Jets)	Yes	Sid Gillman* (San Diego Chargers)	Yes

== See also ==
- List of American Football League players
