= Ordell Braase =

American football player (1932–2019)

- Braase in 1968

No. 81
- Position: Defensive end

Personal information
- Born: March 13, 1932; Mitchell, South Dakota, U.S.
- Died: March 25, 2019 (aged 87); Bradenton, Florida, U.S.
- Listed height: 6 ft 4 in (1.93 m)
- Listed weight: 245 lb (111 kg)

Career information
- High school: Mitchell
- College: South Dakota (1950–1953)
- NFL draft: 1954: 14th round, 160th overall pick

Career history
- Baltimore Colts (1957–1968)

Awards and highlights
- 3× NFL champion (1958, 1959, 1968); 2× Second-team All-Pro (1966, 1967); 2× Pro Bowl (1966-1967); South Dakota Sports Hall of Fame

Career NFL statistics
- Sacks: 80
- Fumble recoveries: 7
- Touchdowns: 2
- Stats at Pro Football Reference

Ordell Wayne Braase (/ˈbreɪsiː/ BRAY-see; March 13, 1932 – March 25, 2019) was an American professional football defensive end in the National Football League (NFL). He played with the Baltimore Colts throughout his career. While Braase was with the Colts they won the NFL Championship three times, in 1958, 1959 and 1968. He was a Pro Bowl pick in both 1966 and 1967. In his final season (1968), the Colts went to Super Bowl III, on January 12, 1969, only to lose to the New York Jets.

== Early life ==
Braase was born on March 13, 1932, in Mitchell South Dakota. He attended Mitchell High School, where he was an all-state basketball player, and his basketball team won the state Class-A title in 1950. Braase was selected to the Class-A All-Tournament team at center by the eight participating coaches.

In March 1969, Braase announced his retirement from professional football at Mitchell's Corn Palace, during an annual sports banquet. A few years earlier, representatives from Mitchell had honored Braase with "Ordell Braase Day" in neighboring Minnesota, when the Colts were playing a game against the Minnesota Vikings.

== College ==
Braase attended the University of South Dakota on a basketball scholarship. In the 1953-54 basketball season, he led the team averaging 12.4 points and 11.1 rebound per game, and was All-North Central Conference (NCC). He also excelled on the football team, receiving All-NCC honors in both 1953 and 1954.

In 1977, he was inducted into the University of South Dakota Coyote Sports Hall of Fame. Braase was named to both the South Dakota all-time high school and all-time collegiate football teams. He is also a member of the South Dakota Hall of Fame.

== Professional career ==
After playing at South Dakota, the Colts selected Braase in the 14th round of the 1954 NFL draft (160th overall). However, he did not join the team until 1957, delayed by three years of service in the U. S. Army which included a tour of duty in Korea. He joined the Colts in 1957 and played on the Colts for 12 years. From 1957-59, Braase played in every game, splitting time with Don Joyce (who started all but three games at right defensive end during those years). From 1960-68, Braase was the Colts starter at right defensive end.

In Braase's second season, he won an NFL title with the Colts in the 1958 NFL Championship Game, a sudden death overtime victory over the New York Giants. It is a game widely considered one of the best in NFL history, often referred to as "The Greatest Game Ever Played". The Colts won again over the Giants in the 1959 NFL Championship Game, 31–16.

In his first two full seasons starting (1960–61), he had 10.5 and 12 quarterback sacks, respectively. He had 80 total sacks between 1960–68, and double-digit sacks five times in those nine years, with a career high 13.5 in 1964 (the Colts losing to the Cleveland Browns in the 1964 NFL Championship game).

Braase was considered a fine defensive end, but he played opposite the Colts Hall of fame defensive end Gino Marchetti (one of the top players in NFL history), and was typically overshadowed by his hero. After Marchetti retired, Braase stepped up and was named to the Pro Bowl in 1966 and 1967. He was named second-team All Pro both years by the Associated Press (AP), Newspaper Enterprise Association (NEA), and United Press International (UPI).

In his final year, 1968, the Colts won the 1968 NFL Championship game over the Cleveland Browns. Braase played one of his best career games, with three quarterback sacks. The Colts defense held the Browns to 56 yards rushing and 151 passing yards in a 34–0 shutout. The defense set a record that year, allowing only 144 points in 14 games. However, the Colts went on to lose Super Bowl III to the New York Jets, in Braase's last game. The Jets successful offensive strategy was to avoid upcoming young stars at left defensive end, Bubba Smith, and left side linebacker, Mike Curtis; and instead rush 220-pound Matt Snell to the right side of the Colts defense at the nearly 37-year old Braase, and 33-year old linebacker Don Shinnick.

=== NFL Players Association ===
From 1964 to 1967, Braase served as president of the NFL Players Association for two terms. He was elected as NFLPA president following Pete Retzlaff, who had been a star college football player in South Dakota (South Dakota State University) contemporaneously with Braase.

== Post-player life ==
During his football career in Baltimore, Braase performed in commercials for Dixie Cola, even singing their jingle. After retiring he was an executive with Frostie-Dixie Cola Sales.

Following his retirement as an active player, Braase was a restaurant owner in Timonium, Maryland, and in the 1970s was an executive with a Baltimore truck body manufacturer. He also teamed with Hall of fame play-by-play announcer Chuck Thompson to provide color commentary for WCBM radio broadcasts of Colts games (1973–74), and with Ted Moore (1970–72). In the 1990s, he co-hosted a popular program, Braase, Donovan, Davis and Fans on WJZ-TV in Baltimore with fellow Colt teammate Art Donovan. The trio talked more about Art Donovan's fabled stories than contemporary NFL football, but the show held high ratings in its time period. He had earlier hosted a radio show with Donovan, Braase, Donovan and Fans, where he played the straight man for Donovan's story telling.

He also served on the Maryland Racing Commission.

== Death ==
Braase later lived in Bradenton, Florida, where he died in 2019 at the age of 87. He had been suffering from Alzheimer's disease since 2012.
