= Pat Studstill =

American football player (1938–2021)

- Studstill c. 1960

No. 25, 28, 2
- Positions: Wide receiver, punter, return specialist

Personal information
- Born: June 4, 1938; Shreveport, Louisiana, U.S.
- Died: October 16, 2021 (aged 83); Los Angeles, California, U.S.
- Listed height: 6 ft 0 in (1.83 m)
- Listed weight: 180 lb (82 kg)

Career information
- High school: C. E. Byrd (Shreveport)
- College: Houston
- NFL draft: 1961: undrafted

Career history
- Detroit Lions (1961–1962, 1964–1967); Los Angeles Rams (1968–1971); New England Patriots (1972)

Awards and highlights
- First-team All-Pro (1966); Second-team All-Pro (1967); 2× Pro Bowl (1965, 1966); NFL receiving yards leader (1966); NFL record: 99-yard touchdown reception (tied)

Career NFL statistics
- Receptions: 181
- Receiving yards: 2,840
- Receiving touchdowns: 18
- Punts: 560
- Punting yards: 22,764
- All-purpose yards: 5,519
- Stats at Pro Football Reference

Patrick Lewis Studstill Jr. (June 4, 1938 – October 16, 2021) was an American professional football player and actor. He played 12 years in the National Football League (NFL) for the Detroit Lions (1961–1967), Los Angeles Rams (1968–1971), and New England Patriots (1972) as a wide receiver, punter and return specialist. He led the NFL with 457 punt return yards in 1962. In 1966, he led the league in both receiving yards (1,266) and punting yards (3,259). He also tied an NFL record in 1966 with a 99-yard touchdown reception.

== Early life ==
Studstill was born in 1938 in Shreveport, Louisiana. He attended C. E. Byrd High School in Shreveport where he was a star athlete in both track and football. He graduated in 1957 and attended the University of Houston on a football scholarship. He sustained a leg injury as a senior and only played 10 minutes that year.

== Professional career ==
=== Detroit Lions ===
Studstill was undrafted in the 1961 NFL draft. He signed with the Detroit Lions in August 1961. As a rookie, he appeared in all 14 games, principally returning punts and kickoffs. On October 8, 1961, in a victory over the Chicago Bears, he returned a kickoff 100 yards for the Lions. He ranked fourth in the NFL with an average of 28 yards per kickoff return.

In 1962, he led the NFL with 457 yards on 29 punt returns, an average of 15.8 yards per return. He was also the Lions' No. 2 receiver in 1962 with 36 catches for 479 yards and four touchdowns.

Standstill injured his left knee during the Lions' first contact drill in the summer of 1963. He underwent surgery and missed the 1963 season.

In 1965, Studstill appeared in all 14 games for the Lions, including 12 games as a starter at the flanker position. He led the team with 28 receptions and three receiving touchdowns and ranked second on the team with 389 receiving yards. He also added punting to his responsibilities and was the leading punter in the NFL by the middle of October. He finished the 1965 season ranked sixth in the NFL in punting, having kicked 78 times for an average of 42.8 yards per punt. He was chosen for the Pro Bowl at the end of the 1965 season.

Studstill's best year was 1966, when he was second in the NFL with 67 receptions and led the league with 1,266 receiving yards. One of his five touchdowns went for 99 yards, making him the third player to accomplish this feat. Since then, eight other players have tied his record. In 1966, he had an NFL record of five consecutive games with 125+ receiving yards, which has since been tied by Calvin Johnson and broken by A.J. Brown. At the end of the 1966 season, Studstill was selected as a first-team All Pro by the Sporting News, Associated Press, UPI, and Football Weekly.

In 1967, Studstill missed seven games with a pulled hamstring muscle.

=== Los Angeles Rams ===
In April 1968, Studstill was traded to the Los Angeles Rams as part of a multi-player deal that sent Bill Munson to the Lions. Studstill spent four years with the Rams, appearing in 56 games, but only one as a starter. He caught 28 passes for the Rams and scored three touchdowns, but he was used primarily as a punter. He averaged 41.4 yards per punt in 1971.

While playing for the Rams, he wore a maskless helmet while punting, making him one of the last players in the NFL to play without a facemask.

=== New England Patriots ===
Studstill was placed on waivers by the Rams prior to the 1972 season. He was claimed by the New England Patriots. He was used exclusively as a punter during the 1972 season.

Studstill sustained a knee injury during training camp in May 1973. Studstill claimed the injury required surgery, and the Patriots disputed the injury and refused to honor his contract for the 1973 season.

Throughout his career, Studstill punted 560 times for 22,764 yards, averaging 40.7 yards per punt.

== Family and later life ==
Studstill was married in July 1960 to Barbara Jean Pickard. Both were students at the University of Houston. With Barbara, he had a son, Pat Studstill III, and daughter, Lisa. Studstill had several rescue dogs. He later remarried to his second wife, Rita Vennari.

After retiring as a player, he was hired as a technical advisor on the 1974 prison football film, The Longest Yard. He also worked as an actor in television shows, movies, and more than 300 commercials. Between 1981 and 1985, he had a recurring role as Barclay on The Dukes of Hazzard. Other credits included 1st & Ten, Magnum, P.I., The Incredible Hulk, and Paper Lion.

In 1999, Studstill was inducted into the Louisiana Sports Hall of Fame.

He died on October 16, 2021, at his home in Los Angeles.

== NFL career statistics ==
Legend
	Led the league
**Bold**	Career high

=== Regular season ===
Year	Team	Games		Receiving					Punting				
Year	Team	GP	GS	Rec	Yds	Avg	Lng	TD	Pnt	Yds	Y/P	Lng	Blck
1961	DET	**14**	0	5	54	10.8	25	0	1	32	32.0	32	0
1962	DET	**14**	0	36	479	13.3	51	4	–	–	–	–	–
1964	DET	**14**	3	7	102	14.6	27	1	–	–	–	–	–
1965	DET	**14**	12	28	389	13.9	55	3	78	**3,335**	42.8	69	0
1966	DET	**14**	**13**	**67**	**1,266**	**18.9**	**99**	**5**	72	2,956	41.1	66	0
1967	DET	7	5	10	162	16.2	37	2	36	1,602	**44.5**	**78**	0
1968	RAM	**14**	1	7	108	15.4	25	1	**81**	3,207	39.6	58	0
1969	RAM	**14**	0	3	28	9.3	11	0	80	3,259	40.7	60	0
1970	RAM	12	11	26	351	13.5	28	4	67	2,618	39.1	53	0
1971	RAM	**14**	0	–	–	–	–	–	70	2,896	41.4	60	0
1972	NE	**14**	0	–	–	–	–	–	75	2,859	38.1	57	**1**
Career		147	42	181	2,840	15.7	99	18	560	22,764	40.7	78	1
