= Don Shinnick =

American football player and coach (1935–2004)

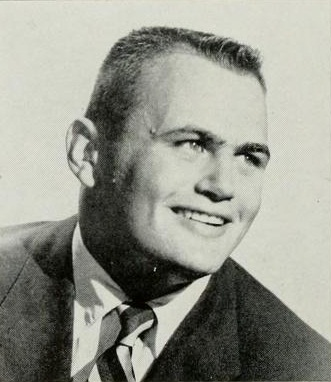
- Shinnick, circa 1956

No. 66, 61
- Position: Linebacker

Personal information
- Born: May 15, 1935; Kansas City, Missouri, U.S.
- Died: January 20, 2004 (aged 68); Modesto, California, U.S.
- Listed height: 6 ft 0 in (1.83 m)
- Listed weight: 232 lb (105 kg)

Career information
- High school: San Pedro (San Pedro, California)
- College: UCLA
- NFL draft: 1957: 2nd round, 20th overall pick

Career history

Playing
- Baltimore Colts (1957–1969)

Coaching
- Chicago Bears (1970–1971) Defensive backs; St. Louis Cardinals (1972) Defensive backs; Oakland Raiders (1973–1978) Linebackers; Central Methodist (1979–1981) Head coach; New England Patriots (1985–1989) Linebackers

Awards and highlights
- As a player: 3× NFL champion (1958, 1959, 1968); Second-team All-Pro (1959); NFL interceptions co-leader (1959); National champion (1954); As a coach: Super Bowl champion (XI)

Career NFL statistics
- Interceptions: 37
- Fumble recoveries: 9
- Sacks: 12.5
- Stats at Pro Football Reference

Donald Dee Shinnick (May 15, 1935 – January 20, 2004) was an American professional football player and coach. He played professionally as a linebacker for 13 seasons in the National Football League (NFL) for the Baltimore Colts. He had 37 career interceptions with the Colts, still an NFL record for a linebacker. Shinnick played college football as a fullback and linebacker University of California, Los Angeles (UCLA).

== Early life ==
Don Shinnick was born May 15, 1935, in Kansas City, Missouri. His parents were divorced when Don was two and his mother moved the family to San Pedro, California, a neighborhood located in the Harbor Region of Los Angeles, in 1942. There his mother remarried and Shinnick spent the whole of his formative years. His step-father owned a hamburger restaurant.

Don Shinnick (R) honed his skills playing football with his brother in a vacant lot next to the family home in San Pedro, California.

Shinnick was raised as a Christian from his boyhood years, gaining confirmation as a member of the Methodist Church at the age of 15. Evangelical religion would remain an important part of Shinnick's identity throughout his life.

Shinnick participated in three sports at San Pedro High School — playing baseball, football, and participating in track and field for the Pirates. In his 1969 memoir, Shinnick recalled football and baseball as his greatest loves, but he made his mark in track, showing proficiency in sprinting and high jumping, with superior shot putting skills, with his top throw of 51'5" best in the Eastern Marine High School League.

He began playing football as a sophomore. Shinnick later joked that he played two positions during that first gridiron season — sitting on the end of the bench to guard the water bucket. The aspiring fullback was able to crack the starting lineup during his junior and senior years of high school, however, making his mark as a blocker and ball-carrier on offense while showing the first glimpses of top-level play as a linebacker on the defensive side of the ball.

During his 1952 senior season, Shinnick scored one touchdown in each of San Pedro's seven games, followed by one in the Los Angeles Milk Bowl. He was named a first-team member of the All-Los Angeles football team as "blocking back" and was Co-Player of the Year in the Eastern Marine League for his efforts.

== College career ==
After his graduation from San Pedro High, Shinnick enrolled in Valley Junior College, located in the Valley Glen neighborhood of Los Angeles. Under the one-platoon system reinstated in college football in 1953, Shinnick again played fullback on offense and linebacker on defense for the Monarchs, while also handling the team's punting duties. Although he missed some time with injuries, Shinnick still managed to shine, winning accolades as the best Junior College football player in the Greater Los Angeles area.

UCLA fullback and linebacker shows his guns, 1956.

On February 15, 1954, Shinnick took his talents to the University of California, Los Angeles (UCLA) when he headed a list of 15 sports stars enrolling at the college. As freshmen were prohibited from varsity team play by NCAA regulation, no time had been lost by playing at the junior college level in 1953, although the course entangled him with another rule that disqualified him as a freshman transfer from participating in UCLA's spring football practice. In the interim, the competitive Shinnick kept himself sharp playing rugby with the UCLA squad.

Shinnick was a reserve during the 1954 Bruins season, but he still managed to find time on the field in game action. The team's first game against a legitimate opponent came in Week 2, when UCLA traveled to Lawrence to play the University of Kansas Jayhawks. In the game Shinnick broke a 4th quarter run for 73 yards to set up the Bruins' final score in a 32–7 triumph.

Shinnick found the end zone for the first time in his college career in an October 23 rout in Corvallis against the Oregon State Beavers. With UCLA taking over on downs at midfield in the third quarter, Shinnick popped a 15-yard run that started a short drive ending with his one-yard plunge into the end zone. Shinnick would finish the day carrying the ball 7 times for 58 yards as part of the Bruins' 61–0 dismantling of Oregon State.

Barred from participating in the Rose Bowl by the Pacific Coast Conference's "no repeat" rule, undefeated UCLA ended the 1954 season watching their rival USC Trojans lose to Ohio State, resulting in a shared national crown between the Bruins and the Buckeyes. Shinnick would finish his first varsity year with 28 carries for 210 yards (7.5 yards per carry average) and one touchdown.

With "The Bull" trapped on the depth chart behind PCC rushing leader Bob Davenport and second-stringer Doug Peters, regarded as among the best fullbacks in school history, UCLA head coach Red Sanders tried to slide him into the regular rotation with a position switch to guard, with Shinnick to remain on the field on the defense as a linebacker. This move was further expedited by the Bruins moving their All-American candidate Hardiman Cureton from his familiar guard spot to left tackle as a way to bolster the line and create starting space for Shinnick. Shinnick continued to bulk up for the rigors of line play, weighing in for 1955 at 231 pounds — heaviest player on the UCLA roster.

The conversion to guard seems to have been successful, with Los Angeles Times sportswriter Dick Hyland noting of Shinnick's performance in the 1955 season opener against Texas A&M that while he "yet has things to learn about defense," as a guard Shinnicks blocking was "steamroller-like, especially off-tackle." Unfortunately, the Bruin's new blocking steamroller sustained a rib injury in the opener, which forced him to miss action the next week.

In an injury-wracked junior season, Shinnick would play a total of just over 183 minutes of football, with the 9–1 Bruins ultimately losing to Michigan State by a field goal in the Rose Bowl.

With the graduation of his Campus Crusade for Christ colleague Bob Davenport, Shinnick was moved back to fullback for his senior 1956 season. This return from the line to the backfield was offset by sanctions against the UCLA football program by the Pacific Coast Conference for alleged under-the-table $40 monthly payments from boosters to athletes and refusal of the school to cooperate with the conference's investigation. The team was banned from post-season play and placed on probation for three years as part of the PCC's action. UCLA seniors were permitted to play only half the team's slate, 5 consecutive games, during the year, with Shinnick scheduled by the team to appear in games 6 through 10.

== Professional career ==
Given his switching of positions twice during three years of varsity football and limited playing time as a result of injury and Pacific Coast Conference sanctions, it is remarkable that Don Shinnick was drafted as highly as he was, selected in the second round of the 1957 NFL draft by the Baltimore Colts, who made him the 20th overall pick. It was not Shinnick's blocking prowess that caught the eye of Colt scouts, but rather his reputation as a "demon on defense" as a linebacker.

In committing to Shinnick, the Colts had to overcome fears that he would follow the example of his friend and UCLA teammate Bob Davenport, who refused to play in the NFL for religious reasons — most of the league's games being held on Sunday, the Christian Sabbath. The linebacker put the team's mind at ease, noting, "After all, a farmer milks his cows on Sunday."

Drafted in November 1956 by the Colts and courted by the Toronto Argonauts of the Big Four Union of Canada, Shinnick was flown out to Baltimore along with his mother and stepfather in the middle of January 1957 to discuss contract terms with Colts vice president Red Kellett in an effort to get the stocky linebacker under contract. He was methodical in making his decision, meeting with Kellett and head coach Weeb Ewbank for 90 minutes before postponing a decision over whether to play in the United States or Canada for three days. "I just want to think everything over at my home in California before deciding," he said at the time.

On January 29 the Colts announced that they had successfully brought Shinnick into the team's fold. As was typically the case in this era, no financial terms were announced to the press. The 21-year old from Southern California was about to embark on a 13-year professional football career as a full-time defender playing his entire career for the franchise that drafted him.

== Coaching career ==
After retiring as a player, he served as an assistant coach with the Chicago Bears, the St. Louis Cardinals, the Oakland Raiders and the New England Patriots. He was also the head football coach at Central Methodist University in Fayette, Missouri from 1979 to 1981.

=== Head coaching record ===
| Year | Team | Overall | Conference | Standing | Bowl/playoffs |
|---|---|---|---|---|---|
Central Methodist Eagles (Heart of America Athletic Conference) (1979–1981)
| 1979 | Central Methodist | 2–7 | 1–5 | 6th | |
| 1980 | Central Methodist | 2–8 | 2–6 | T–7th | |
| 1981 | Central Methodist | 3–7 | 2–6 | 7th | |
| Central Methodist: | | 7–22 | 5–17 | | |
| Total: | | 7–22 | | | |

== Death and legacy ==
Shinnick died at a rest home in Modesto, California on January 20, 2004, of frontal lobe disorder.

Shinnick's son, Pete Shinnick, serves as the head football coach for Towson University.
