= 1966 NFL season =

American football season

Regular season
- Duration: September 10 – December 18, 1966
- East Champions: Dallas Cowboys
- West Champions: Green Bay Packers

Championship Game
- Champions: Green Bay Packers

NFL teams: West, East

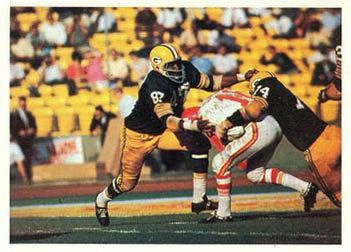
The Packers defeated the Chiefs in the first AFL–NFL Championship Game (Super Bowl I)

The 1966 NFL season was the 47th regular season of the National Football League, and the first season in which the Super Bowl was played, though it was called the AFL-NFL World Championship Game. The league expanded to 15 teams with the addition of the Atlanta Falcons, making a bye necessary one week for each team.

This was the last season that the NFL was divided only into two separate divisions, and only one postseason round was played, that being between the two division champions. The season concluded with the first AFL-NFL World Championship Game; the NFL champion Green Bay Packers defeated the AFL's Kansas City Chiefs 35–10 at the Los Angeles Memorial Coliseum on January 15, 1967. The interleague championship game would eventually be named the Super Bowl, and the 1966 season is now considered the first of the Super Bowl era.

Pat Studstill for the Detroit Lions set a record for consecutive games with more than 125 receiving yards with five, a record which was not tied until Calvin Johnson several decades later. He also became the 3rd ever player to complete a 99-yard pass play.

The highest scoring game in NFL history also took place during this season, with the then Washington Redskins defeating the New York Giants in a week 12 showdown with a final score of 72–41.

With the growth in popularity of televised NFL games, the league began looking for a second team in addition to the Detroit Lions, to host an annual Thanksgiving Day game. Every team turned down the offer, except for the Dallas Cowboys. General Manager Tex Schramm recognized this as an opportunity for the franchise to increase its popularity and establish its own Thanksgiving Day game tradition.

In 1966, the Cowboys who had been founded six years earlier, adopted the practice of hosting Thanksgiving games. It is widely rumored that the Cowboys sought a guarantee that they would regularly host Thanksgiving games as a condition of their very first one (since games on days other than Sunday were uncommon at the time and thus high attendance was not a certainty). Since then, the two "traditional" Thanksgiving Day pro football games have been in Detroit and Dallas (except 1975 and 1977, when St. Louis hosted instead of Dallas). Primetime games on Thanksgiving night would not occur until 2006.

== The AFL-NFL merger agreement ==
As the competitive war between the NFL and the American Football League reached its peak, the two leagues agreed on June 8, 1966, to merge. Under the agreement:

- The two leagues would combine to form an expanded league with 24 teams, which would be increased to 26 teams by 1969, and to 28 teams by 1970 or soon thereafter.
- All existing teams would be retained, and none of them would be moved outside of their metropolitan areas.
- While maintaining separate schedules through 1969, the leagues agreed to play an annual AFL-NFL World Championship Game beginning in January 1967 (this game was eventually renamed the Super Bowl, with all four AFL-NFL matchups being retroactively renamed as such).
- The two leagues would officially merge in 1970 to form one league with two conferences (named American Football Conference and National Football Conference).

== Expansion ==
On June 3, 1965, the NFL announced its plans to add two teams in 1967. Four days later on June 7, the eight franchises of the rival American Football League (AFL) voted unanimously to add two teams in 1966, an AFL franchise was awarded to Atlanta the next day.

The NFL awarded the first of the two expansion franchises to the city of Atlanta on June 30, 1965. Commissioner Pete Rozelle granted ownership of the Atlanta Falcons to Rankin Smith, Sr. and they were awarded the first pick in the 1966 NFL draft, as well as the final pick in each of the first five rounds. The league also provided the Falcons with an expansion draft six weeks later.

The AFL had originally targeted Atlanta and Philadelphia, but its two expansion teams became the Miami Dolphins in 1966 and the Cincinnati Bengals in 1968.

The competition with the AFL for Atlanta forced the first to be added a year early. The odd number of teams (15) in 1966 resulted in one idle team (bye) each week, with each team playing fourteen games over fifteen weeks (similar to 1960: twelve games over thirteen weeks). The second expansion team, the New Orleans Saints, joined the NFL as planned in 1967 as its sixteenth franchise. Scheduled byes in the NFL's regular season did not return until 1990.

=== Expansion draft ===
The 1966 NFL expansion draft was held on February 15, 1966, with Falcons selecting 42 players from the other NFL teams.

== Draft ==
The 1966 NFL draft was held on November 27, 1965, at New York City's Summit Hotel. With the first pick, the expansion Atlanta Falcons selected linebacker Tommy Nobis from the University of Texas.

== Major rule changes ==
Goal posts were standardized in the NFL. They were to be 3–4 inches (7.6–10.2 cm) in diameter, painted bright yellow, with two non-curved supports offset from the goal line, and uprights 20 feet (6.1 m) above the crossbar. In 1967, the new "slingshot" goal post was made standard, with one curved support from the ground. In 1974, the goal posts were returned to the end line, and the uprights were extended to 30 feet (9.1 m) above the crossbar, and to 35 feet (10.7 m) in 2014.

The new goal-post rule is often referred to as the "Don Chandler Rule", referring to the placekicker for the Green Bay Packers. Although widely denied, the height increase of the uprights was in reaction to the previous season's Western Divisional playoff game at Lambeau Field in Green Bay. Chandler kicked a controversial field goal that tied the game with under two minutes remaining. The kick was high above the upright, and many spectators thought that the kick missed; however, the kick was ruled good by field judge Jim Tunney. Chandler later hit a field goal that defeated the Baltimore Colts in overtime. The following week, the Packers defeated the Cleveland Browns in the NFL Championship Game, their first of three consecutive league titles.

Another rule change born from the 1965 Western Divisional playoff was two officials (the back judge and field judge) were stationed under each upright for field goal and extra point attempts.

== Conference races ==
In the Western Division, Green Bay's first loss was in week 5, falling 21–20 in San Francisco to tie them with the Rams. The Rams lost 35–7 to Minnesota the next week, and Green Bay stayed in front until week 9, when Minnesota beat them 20–17. Baltimore's 19–7 win over Atlanta briefly tied it with the Packers at 7–2–0 in week 10, but the Colts lost to Detroit the next week, 20–14. The Packers clinched the title in week 13.

In the Eastern Division, the St. Louis Cardinals took the early lead, winning their first five games. (The Dallas Cowboys were also unbeaten, but due to a bye in Week One, they had played one fewer game and thus were a half-game behind the Cardinals in the standings.) The unbeaten teams met in week 6, and both were still unbeaten after they played to a 10–10 tie. However, both teams suffered their first defeat the next week, with St. Louis losing at Washington, 26–20, and the Cowboys falling in Cleveland, 30–21. In week 9 (November 6), St. Louis beat the Giants, 20–17, while Dallas came up short in a 24–23 loss to the Eagles. The next week, Dallas won at Washington 31–30 on a field goal with 0:15 left, while the Cards fell at Pittsburgh, 30–9, cutting their safety margin to a half-game again. St. Louis had a bye in week 11, and a 20–7 Dallas victory over Pittsburgh gave the Cards and Cowboys records of 7–2–1. Both teams won the next week, setting up the stage for their December 4 meeting in Dallas during week 13. The Cards took a 10–7 lead in the first quarter, but Dallas won 31–17 to take over the conference lead. In Week Fourteen, Dallas hosted Washington, and lost 34–31 on a field goal at 0:08. The Cardinals were in a must-win game against what should have been an easy opponent, the new (2–10–0) Atlanta Falcons. Instead, the Falcons notched their third win and virtually ended St. Louis's hopes to go to the title game. The St. Louis Cardinals, who lost again the next week, never got that close to the Super Bowl again before moving to Phoenix in 1988.

Week	Western		Eastern		Bye
1	Detroit, Green Bay, Los Angeles (tie)	1–0–0	Cleveland, St. Louis (tie)	1–0–0	Dallas Cowboys
2	Green Bay, Los Angeles (tie)	2–0–0	St. Louis, Pittsburgh (tie)	2–0–0	San Francisco 49ers
3	Green Bay Packers	3–0–0	St. Louis Cardinals	3–0–0	Chicago Bears
4	Green Bay Packers	4–0–0	St. Louis Cardinals	4–0–0	Baltimore Colts
5	Green Bay, Los Angeles (tie)	4–1–0	St. Louis Cardinals	5–0–0	Minnesota Vikings
6	Green Bay Packers	5–1–0	St. Louis Cardinals	5–0–1	Cleveland Browns
7	Green Bay Packers	6–1–0	St. Louis Cardinals	5–1–1	Pittsburgh Steelers
8	Green Bay Packers	7–1–0	St. Louis Cardinals	6–1–1	New York Giants
9	Green Bay Packers	7–2–0	St. Louis Cardinals	7–1–1	Atlanta Falcons
10	Baltimore, Green Bay (tie)	7–2–0	St. Louis Cardinals	7–2–1	Green Bay Packers
11	Green Bay Packers	8–2–0	Dallas, St. Louis (tie)	7–2–1	St. Louis Cardinals
12	Green Bay Packers	9–2–0	Dallas, St. Louis (tie)	8–2–1	Philadelphia Eagles
13	Green Bay Packers	10–2–0	Dallas Cowboys	9–2–1	Washington Redskins
14	Green Bay Packers	11–2–0	Dallas Cowboys	9–3–1	Los Angeles Rams
15	Green Bay Packers	12–2–0	Dallas Cowboys	10–3–1	Detroit Lions

- A bye week was necessary in 1966, as the league had an odd-number (15) of teams; one team was idle each week. The sixteenth team (New Orleans) joined the league in 1967.

== Final standings ==
NFL Eastern Conference
	W	L	T	PCT	CONF	PF	PA	STK
Dallas Cowboys	10	3	1	.769	9–3–1	445	239	W1
Cleveland Browns	9	5	0	.643	9–4	403	259	W1
Philadelphia Eagles	9	5	0	.643	8–5	326	340	W4
St. Louis Cardinals	8	5	1	.615	7–5–1	264	265	L3
Washington Redskins	7	7	0	.500	7–6	351	355	L1
Pittsburgh Steelers	5	8	1	.385	4–8–1	316	347	W2
Atlanta Falcons	3	11	0	.214	2–5	204	437	L1
New York Giants	1	12	1	.077	1–11–1	263	501	L8

Note: Tie games were not officially counted in the standings until 1972.

NFL Western Conference
	W	L	T	PCT	CONF	PF	PA	STK
Green Bay Packers	12	2	0	.857	10–2	335	163	W5
Baltimore Colts	9	5	0	.643	7–5	314	226	W1
Los Angeles Rams	8	6	0	.571	6–6	289	212	L1
San Francisco 49ers	6	6	2	.500	5–5–2	320	325	L1
Chicago Bears	5	7	2	.417	4–6–2	234	272	W1
Detroit Lions	4	9	1	.308	3–8–1	206	317	L3
Minnesota Vikings	4	9	1	.308	4–7–1	292	304	L1

== Postseason ==
=== NFL Championship Game ===
- Green Bay 34, Dallas 27 at the Cotton Bowl in Dallas, Texas, on January 1, 1967

==== AFL Championship Game ====
- Kansas City 31, Buffalo 7, at War Memorial Stadium in Buffalo, New York, on January 1, 1967

=== Playoff Bowl ===
The Playoff Bowl was between the division runners-up, for third place in the league. This was its seventh year, and it was played a week after the title game.

- Baltimore 20, Philadelphia 14 at Orange Bowl, Miami, Florida, January 8, 1967

=== AFL–NFL World Championship Game ===
The Green Bay Packers defeated the Kansas City Chiefs, league champion of the 1966 American Football League season, 35–10, at Los Angeles Memorial Coliseum, on January 15, 1967.

== Awards ==
Most Valuable Player	Bart Starr, quarterback, Green Bay
Coach of the Year	Tom Landry, Dallas

== Coaching changes ==
- Atlanta Falcons: Norb Hecker became the expansion team's first head coach.
- Los Angeles Rams: Harland Svare was replaced by George Allen.
- St. Louis Cardinals: Wally Lemm was replaced by Charley Winner.
- Pittsburgh Steelers: Mike Nixon was replaced by Bill Austin.
- Washington Redskins: Bill McPeak was replaced by Otto Graham.

== Stadium changes ==
- The expansion Atlanta Falcons began play at Atlanta Stadium
- The St. Louis Cardinals opened the new Civic Center Busch Memorial Stadium, replacing the older Busch Stadium (Sportsman's Park)

== See also ==
- 1966 American Football League season
