= 1962 Pittsburgh Steelers season =

Steelers 30th US football season

- Owner: Art Rooney
- Head coach: Buddy Parker
- Home stadium: Forbes Field (five games); Pitt Stadium (two games)

Results
- Record: 9–5
- Division place: 2nd NFL Eastern
- Playoffs: Lost NFL Playoff Bowl (vs. Lions) 10–17

The 1962 Pittsburgh Steelers season marked the franchise's 30th year in the National Football League (NFL). The team finished in second place with 9 wins and 5 losses. The Steelers played in the NFL Playoff Bowl but lost to the Detroit Lions 17–10.

== Standings ==
NFL Eastern Conference
	W	L	T	PCT	CONF	PF	PA	STK
New York Giants	12	2	0	.857	10–2	398	283	W9
Pittsburgh Steelers	9	5	0	.643	8–4	312	363	W3
Cleveland Browns	7	6	1	.538	6–5–1	291	257	W1
Washington Redskins	5	7	2	.417	4–6–2	305	376	L1
Dallas Cowboys	5	8	1	.385	4–7–1	398	402	L2
St. Louis Cardinals	4	9	1	.308	4–7–1	287	361	W2
Philadelphia Eagles	3	10	1	.231	3–8–1	282	356	L2

Note: Tie games were not officially counted in the standings until 1972.

== Regular season ==
=== Schedule ===
Game	Date	Opponent	Result	Record	Venue	Attendance	Recap	Sources
1	September 16	at Detroit Lions	**L** 7–45	0–1	Tiger Stadium	46,641	Recap	
2	September 23	at **Dallas Cowboys**	**W** 30–28	1–1	Cotton Bowl	19,478	Recap	
3	September 30	**New York Giants**	**L** 27–31	1–2	Pitt Stadium	40,916	Recap	
4	October 6	**Philadelphia Eagles**	**W** 13–7	2–2	Forbes Field	23,164	Recap	
5	October 14	at **New York Giants**	**W** 20–17	3–2	Yankee Stadium	62,808	Recap	
6	October 21	**Dallas Cowboys**	**L** 27–42	3–3	Forbes Field	23,106	Recap	
7	October 28	**Cleveland Browns**	**L** 14–41	3–4	Pitt Stadium	35,417	Recap	
8	November 4	Minnesota Vikings	**W** 39–31	4–4	Forbes Field	14,642	Recap	
9	November 11	at **St. Louis Cardinals**	**W** 26–17	5–4	Busch Stadium	20,265	Recap	
10	November 18	**Washington Redskins**	**W** 23–21	6–4	Forbes Field	21,231	Recap	
11	November 25	at **Cleveland Browns**	**L** 14–35	6–5	Cleveland Stadium	53,601	Recap	
12	December 2	**St. Louis Cardinals**	**W** 19–7	7–5	Forbes Field	17,285	Recap	
13	December 9	at **Philadelphia Eagles**	**W** 26–17	8–5	Franklin Field	60,671	Recap	
14	December 16	at **Washington Redskins**	**W** 27–24	9–5	RFK Stadium	34,508	Recap	
Note: Intra-conference opponents are in **bold** text.

== Roster ==
1962 Pittsburgh Steelers roster
Quarterbacks (QB): 22 Bobby Layne; 18 Terry Nofsinger; Running backs (RB): 46 Bob Ferguson; 42 Dick Hoak; 35 John Henry Johnson; 27 Tom Tracy; 32 Joe Womack; Wide receivers (WR): 48 Gary Ballman; 86 John Burrell; 84 Buddy Dial; 23 Red Mack; Tight ends (TE): 40 Preston Carpenter; 88 John Powers	Offensive linemen (OL): 71 Charlie Bradshaw T; 77 Dan James T; 72 Ray Lemek G; 51 Buzz Nutter C; 62 Mike Sandusky G; 68 Ron Stehouwer G; Defensive linemen (DL): 74 Lou Cordileone DT; 75 Joe Krupa DT; 76 Gene Lipscomb DT; 70 Ernie Stautner DE	Linebackers (LB): 65 Tom Bettis MLB; 37 Ken Kirk OLB; 50 John Reger OLB; 67 Bob Schmitz MLB; 82 George Tarasovic OLB; Defensive backs (DB): 44 Willie Daniel CB/FS; 87 Glenn Glass CB/S; 27 Dick Haley SS; 26 Brady Keys CB; 47 Jackie Simpson FS; 28 Clendon Thomas CB; Special teams (ST): 79 Lou Michaels DE/K; 15 Ed Brown QB/P	Reserve: 78 John Baker DE (NF-Ill.); 28 Henry Clement TE (IR); 24 Johnny Sample S (IR); 36 Rudy Hayes LB (NF-Ill.); 66 Myron Pottios LB (IR); Rookies in italics 36 active, 5 reserve

== Game summaries ==
=== Week 1 (Sunday September 16, 1962): Detroit Lions ===
	1	2	3	4	Total
Steelers	0	7	0	0	7
Lions	0	21	7	17	45

at Tiger Stadium, Detroit, Michigan

- Game time:
- Game weather:
- Game attendance: 46,641
- Referee:
- TV announcers:

Scoring Drives:

- Detroit – Cogdill 1 pass from Plum (Walker kick)
- Pittsburgh – Carpenter 43 pass from Brown (Michaels kick)
- Detroit – Pietrosante 22 run (Walker kick)
- Detroit – Cogdill 21 pass from Plum (Walker kick)
- Detroit – Lewis 1 run (Walker kick)
- Detroit – Lewis 1 run (Walker kick)
- Detroit – FG Walker 44
- Detroit – Studstill 9 pass from Plum (Walker kick)

=== Week 2 (Sunday September 23, 1962): Dallas Cowboys ===
	1	2	3	4	Total
Steelers	0	21	2	7	30
Cowboys	7	0	7	14	28

at Cotton Bowl, Dallas, Texas

- Game time:
- Game weather:
- Game attendance: 19,478
- Referee:
- TV announcers:

Scoring Drives:

- Dallas – Lockett 29 pass from LeBaron (Baker kick)
- Pittsburgh – Womack 16 run (Michaels kick)
- Pittsburgh – Dial 38 pass from Layne (Michaels kick)
- Pittsburgh – Johnson 16 pass from Layne (Michaels kick)
- Dallas – Perkins 2 run (Baker kick)
- Pittsburgh – Safety, Dallas holding in end zone
- Dallas – Perkins 6 run (Baker kick)
- Pittsburgh – Womack 3 run (Michaels kick)
- Dallas – Clarke 13 pass from LeBaron (Baker kick)

=== Week 3 (Sunday September 30, 1962): New York Giants ===
	1	2	3	4	Total
Giants	3	14	7	7	31
Steelers	14	3	3	7	27

at Forbes Field, Pittsburgh, Pennsylvania

- Game time:
- Game weather:
- Game attendance: 40,916
- Referee:
- TV announcers:

Scoring Drives:

- Pittsburgh – Womack 7 run (Michaels kick)
- New York Giants – FG Chandler 23
- Pittsburgh – Mack 28 pass from Layne (Michaels kick)
- New York Giants – Dudley 11 pass from Tittle (Chandler kick)
- Pittsburgh – FG Michaels 41
- New York Giants – Webster 58 pass from Tittle (Chandler kick)
- Pittsburgh – FG Michaels 33
- New York Giants – Gifford 27 pass from Tittle (Chandler kick)
- New York Giants – Shofner 16 pass from Tittle (Chandler kick)
- Pittsburgh – Johnson 1 run (Michaels kick)

=== Week 4 (Saturday October 6, 1962): Philadelphia Eagles ===
	1	2	3	4	Total
Eagles	0	0	7	0	7
Steelers	10	3	0	0	13

at Forbes Field, Pittsburgh, Pennsylvania

- Game time:
- Game weather:
- Game attendance: 23,164
- Referee:
- TV announcers:

Scoring Drives:

- Pittsburgh – FG Michaels 14
- Pittsburgh – Schmitz 24 interception return (Michaels kick)
- Pittsburgh – FG Michaels 10
- Philadelphia – McDonald 46 pass from Jurgensen (Walston kick)

=== Week 5 (Sunday October 14, 1962): New York Giants ===
	1	2	3	4	Total
Steelers	0	7	10	3	20
Giants	3	0	7	7	17

at Yankee Stadium, The Bronx, New York

- Game time:
- Game weather:
- Game attendance: 62,808
- Referee:
- TV announcers:

Scoring Drives:

- New York Giants – FG Chandler 30
- Pittsburgh – Layne 1 run (Michaels kick)
- Pittsburgh – Johnson 5 pass from Layne (Michaels kick)
- New York Giants – Walton 21 pass from Tittle (Chandler kick)
- Pittsburgh – FG Michaels 16
- Pittsburgh – FG Michaels 9
- New York Giants – Gifford 16 pass from Tittle (Chandler kick)

=== Week 6 (Sunday October 21, 1962): Dallas Cowboys ===
	1	2	3	4	Total
Cowboys	14	7	7	14	42
Steelers	7	3	3	14	27

at Forbes Field, Pittsburgh, Pennsylvania

- Game time:
- Game weather:
- Game attendance: 23,106
- Referee:
- TV announcers:

Scoring Drives:'

- Dallas – Perkins 1 run (Baker kick)
- Pittsburgh – Dial 26 pass from Layne (Michaels kick)
- Dallas – Howton 16 pass from LeBaron (Baker kick)
- Pittsburgh – FG Michaels 10
- Dallas – Clark 45 pass from LeBaron (Baker kick)
- Pittsburgh – FG Michaels 40
- Dallas – Clark 3 pass from LeBaron (Baker kick)
- Pittsburgh – Johnson 1 run (Michaels kick)
- Pittsburgh – Dial 9 pass form Layne (Michaels kick)
- Dallas – Clarke 13 pass from LeBaron (Baker kick)
- Dallas Folkins 26 pass from LeBaron (Baker kick)

=== Week 7 (Sunday October 28, 1962): Cleveland Browns ===
	1	2	3	4	Total
Browns	7	0	17	17	41
Steelers	0	0	7	7	14

at Forbes Field, Pittsburgh, Pennsylvania

- Game time:
- Game weather:
- Game attendance: 35,417
- Referee:
- TV announcers:

Scoring Drives:

- Cleveland – Costello 21 fumble run (Groza kick)
- Cleveland – FG Groza 37
- Cleveland – Scales 12 run (Groza kick)
- Pittsburgh – Hoak 1 run (Michaels kick)
- Cleveland – Brown 15 pass from Ryan (Groza kick)
- Cleveland – FG Groza 51
- Cleveland – Brown 1 run (Groza kick)
- Cleveland – Green 8 pass from Ryan (Groza kick)
- Pittsburgh – Dial 6 pass from Brown (Michaels kick)

=== Week 8 (Sunday November 4, 1962): Minnesota Vikings ===
	1	2	3	4	Total
Vikings	0	14	7	10	31
Steelers	7	7	12	13	39

at Forbes Field, Pittsburgh, Pennsylvania

- Game time:
- Game weather:
- Game attendance: 14,642
- Referee:
- TV announcers:

Scoring Drives:

- Pittsburgh – Johnson 2 run (Michaels kick)
- PIttsburgh – Womack 3 run (Michaels kick)
- Minnesota – Mason 37 pass from Tarkenton (Christopherson kick)
- Minnesota – Ferguson 19 pass from Tarkenton (Christopherson kick)
- Pittsburgh – Safety, Huth recovered fumble in end zone, covered by Stautner
- PIttsburgh – FG Michaels 32
- Pittsburgh – Johnson 2 run (Michaels kick)
- Minnesota Reichow 4 pass from Tarkenton (Christopherson kick)
- Pittsburgh – FG Michaels 38
- Minnesota – Ferguson 59 pass from Tarkenton (Christopherson kick)
- Minnesota – FG Christopherson 42
- Pittsburgh – FG Michaels
- Pittsburgh – Hoak 16 run (Michaels kick)

=== Week 9 (Sunday November 11, 1962): St. Louis Cardinals ===
	1	2	3	4	Total
Steelers	3	6	0	17	26
Cardinals	7	3	7	0	17

at Busch Stadium, St. Louis, Missouri

- Game time:
- Game weather:
- Game attendance: 20,265
- Referee:
- TV announcers:

Scoring Drives:

- St. Louis – Crow 22 run (Perry kick)
- Pittsburgh – FG Michaels 27
- St. Louis – FG Perry 22
- Pittsburgh – Carpenter 9 pass from Layne (kick failed)
- St. Louis – Gautt 1 run (Perry kick)
- Pittsburgh – Hoak 5 run (Michaels kick)
- Pittsburgh – Johnson 5 run (Michaels kick)
- Pittsburgh – FG Michaels 8

=== Week 10 (Sunday November 18, 1962): Washington Redskins ===
	1	2	3	4	Total
Redskins	0	7	14	0	21
Steelers	3	3	0	17	23

at Forbes Field, Pittsburgh, Pennsylvania

- Game time:
- Game weather:
- Game attendance: 21,231
- Referee:
- TV announcers:

Scoring Drives:

- Pittsburgh – FG Michaels 37
- Washington – Cunningham 10 pass from Snead (Khayat kick)
- Pittsburgh – FG Michaels 18
- Washington – Anderson 46 pass from Snead (Khayat kick)
- Washington – Barnes 32 run (Khayat kick)
- Pittsburgh – Mack 20 pass from Brown (Michaels kick)
- Pittsburgh – Dial 9 pass from Brown (Michaels kick)
- Pittsburgh – FG Michaels 24

=== Week 11 (Sunday November 25, 1962): Cleveland Browns ===
	1	2	3	4	Total
Steelers	0	0	7	7	14
Browns	0	14	0	21	35

at Cleveland Municipal Stadium, Cleveland, Ohio

- Game time:
- Game weather:
- Game attendance: 53,601
- Referee:
- TV announcers:

Scoring Drives:

- Cleveland – Brown 34 pass from Ryan (Groza kick)
- Cleveland – Collins 12 pass from Ryan (Groza kick)
- Pittsburgh – Womack 15 run (Michaels kick)
- Cleveland – Renfro 31 pass from Ryan (Groza kick)
- Pittsburgh – Johnson 6 run (Michaels kick)
- Cleveland – Brown 1 run (Groza kick)
- Cleveland – Brown 1 run (Groza kick)

=== Week 12 (Sunday December 2, 1962): St. Louis Cardinals ===
	1	2	3	4	Total
Cardinals	0	0	0	7	7
Steelers	7	0	6	6	19

at Forbes Field, Pittsburgh, Pennsylvania

- Game time:
- Game weather:
- Game attendance: 17,285
- Referee:
- TV announcers:

Scoring Drives:

- Pittsburgh – Daniel 49 interception return (Michaels kick)
- Pittsburgh – FG Michaels 35
- Pittsburgh – FG Michaels 36
- Pittsburgh – FG Michaels 23
- St. Louis – Randle 12 pass from Johnson (Perry kick)
- Pittsburgh – FG Michaels 10

=== Week 13 (Sunday December 9, 1962): Philadelphia Eagles ===
	1	2	3	4	Total
Steelers	0	17	0	9	26
Eagles	7	0	10	0	17

at Franklin Field, Philadelphia

- Game time:
- Game weather:
- Game attendance: 60,671
- Referee: George Rennix
- TV announcers:

Scoring Drives:

- Philadelphia – Retzlaff 7 pass from Jurgensen (Walston kick)
- Pittsburgh – Carpenter 12 pass from Brown (Michaels kick)
- Pittsburgh – FG Michaels 21
- Pittsburgh – Johnson 1 run (Michaels kick)
- Philadelphia – Retzlaff 49 pass from Jurgensen (Walston kick)
- Philadelphia – FG Wittenborn 18
- Pittsburgh – FG Michaels 46
- Pittsburgh – FG Michaels 28
- Pittsburgh – FG Michaels 29

=== Week 14 (Sunday December 16, 1962): Washington Redskins ===
	1	2	3	4	Total
Steelers	7	7	6	7	27
Redskins	3	0	7	14	24

at D.C. Stadium, Washington, D.C.

- Game time:
- Game weather:
- Game attendance: 34,508
- Referee:
- TV announcers:

Scoring Drives:

- Washington – FG Khayat 33
- Pittsburgh – Dial 39 pass from Layne (Michaels kick)
- Pittsburgh – Hoak 1 run (Michaels kick)
- Washington – James 25 pass from Izo (Khayat kick)
- Pittsburgh – FG Michaels 38
- Pittsburgh – FG Michaels 13
- Pittsburgh – Carpenter 23 pass from Layne (Michaels kick)
- Washington – James 49 pass from Izo (Khayat kick)
- Washington – Anderson 26 pass from Izo (Khayat kick)

== Playoff Bowl ==
The game matched the conference runners-up for third place in the league and was played three weeks after the end of the regular season (and a week after the championship game). The ten editions of the Playoff Bowl, all held at the Orange Bowl in Miami, Florida, are now considered exhibition games by the NFL, not post-season contests.

Round	Date	Opponent	Result	Venue	Attendance	Recap	Sources
Playoff Bowl	January 6, 1963	Detroit Lions	L 10–17	Orange Bowl	36,284		
