= 1961 Pittsburgh Steelers season =

NFL team season

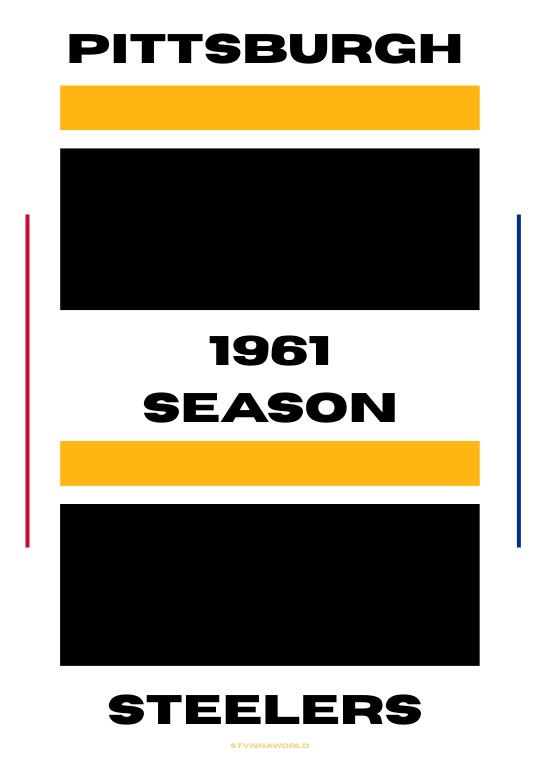
- Owner: Art Rooney
- Head coach: Buddy Parker
- Home stadium: Forbes Field

Results
- Record: 6–8
- Division place: 5th NFL Eastern
- Playoffs: Did not qualify

The 1961 Pittsburgh Steelers season was the franchise's 29th in the National Football League.

== Offseason ==
=== NFL draft ===
1961 Pittsburgh Steelers draft
Round	Pick	Player	Position	College	Notes
2	19	Myron Pottios *	Linebacker	Notre Dame	
5	59	Fred Mautino	End	Syracuse	
7	90	Dick Hoak	Running back	Penn State	
8	103	George Balthazar	Tackle	Tennessee State	
10	131	Red Mack	Wide receiver	Notre Dame	
11	146	Henry Clement	Tight end	North Carolina	
12	159	Frank Jackunas	Center	Detroit	
Made roster * Made at least one Pro Bowl during career

== Roster ==
1961 Pittsburgh Steelers roster
Quarterbacks (QB): 10 Rudy Bukich; 22 Bobby Layne; 18 Terry Nofsinger; Running backs (RB): 42 Dick Hoak; 35 John Henry Johnson; 34 Charley Scales; 27 Tom Tracy; Wide receivers (WR): 46 Bob Coronado; 84 Buddy Dial; 23 Red Mack; 88 Bob Schnelker; Tight ends (TE): 40 Preston Carpenter; 28 Henry Clement	Offensive linemen (OL): 71 Charlie Bradshaw T; 77 Dan James T; 65 John Nisby G; 51 Buzz Nutter C; 62 Mike Sandusky G; 68 Ron Stehouwer G; Defensive linemen (DL): 74 George Demko DE; 64 John Kapele DE; 75 Joe Krupa DT; 76 Gene Lipscomb DE; 79 Lou Michaels DE/K; 70 Ernie Stautner DT	Linebackers (LB): 37 Mike Henry OLB; 66 Myron Pottios MLB; 50 John Reger OLB; 67 Bob Schmitz OLB; Defensive backs (DB): 44 Willie Daniel FS; 27 Dick Haley SS; 26 Brady Keys CB; 24 Johnny Sample CB; 47 Jackie Simpson SS; 20 Jack Stanton CB/S; Special teams (ST): 89 Bobby Joe Green P	Reserve: 86 Len Burnett WR (IR); 20 Bill Butler CB (IR); 82 George Tarasovic LB (IR); Rookies in italics 36 active, 3 reserve

== Standings ==
NFL Eastern Conference
	W	L	T	PCT	CONF	PF	PA	STK
New York Giants	10	3	1	.769	9–2–1	368	220	T1
Philadelphia Eagles	10	4	0	.714	8–4	361	297	W1
Cleveland Browns	8	5	1	.615	8–3–1	319	270	T1
St. Louis Cardinals	7	7	0	.500	7–5	279	267	W3
Pittsburgh Steelers	6	8	0	.429	5–7	295	287	L1
Dallas Cowboys	4	9	1	.308	2–9–1	236	380	L4
Washington Redskins	1	12	1	.077	1–10–1	174	392	W1

Note: Tie games were not officially counted in the standings until 1972.

== Regular season ==
=== Schedule ===
Game	Date	Opponent	Result	Record	Venue	Attendance	Recap	Sources
1	September 17	at Dallas Cowboys	**L** 24–27	0–1	Cotton Bowl	23,500		
2	September 24	New York Giants	**L** 14–17	0–2	Pitt Stadium	35,587		
3	October 1	at Los Angeles Rams	**L** 14–24	0–3	Memorial Coliseum	40,407		
4	October 8	at Philadelphia Eagles	**L** 16–21	0–4	Franklin Field	60,671		
5	October 15	Washington Redskins	**W** 20–0	1–4	Forbes Field	15,072		
6	October 22	Cleveland Browns	**L** 28–30	1–5	Forbes Field	29,266		
7	October 29	San Francisco 49ers	**W** 20–10	2–5	Forbes Field	21,686		
8	November 5	at Cleveland Browns	**W** 17–13	3–5	Cleveland Stadium	62,723		
9	November 12	Dallas Cowboys	**W** 37–7	4–5	Forbes Field	17,519		
10	November 19	at New York Giants	**L** 21–42	4–6	Yankee Stadium (I)	62,592		
11	November 26	St. Louis Cardinals	**W** 30–27	5–6	Forbes Field	17,090		
12	December 3	Philadelphia Eagles	**L** 24–35	5–7	Forbes Field	21,653		
13	December 10	at Washington Redskins	**W** 30–14	6–7	D.C. Stadium	21,134		
14	December 17	at St. Louis Cardinals	**L** 0–20	6–8	Busch Stadium (I)	16,298		
Note: Intra-conference opponents are in **bold** text.

== Game summaries ==
=== Week 1 (Sunday September 17, 1961): Dallas Cowboys ===
	1	2	3	4	Total
Steelers	0	14	0	10	24
Cowboys	7	3	7	10	27

at Cotton Bowl, Dallas, Texas

- Game time:
- Game weather:
- Game attendance: 23,500
- Referee:
- TV announcers:

Scoring Drives:

- Dallas – Clarke 44 pass from LeBaron (Green kick)
- Pittsburgh – Johnson 1 run (Layne kick)
- Pittsburgh – Dial 44 pass from Layne (Layne kick)
- Dallas – FG Green 15
- Dallas – Howton 45 pass from LeBaron (Green kick)
- Pittsburgh – FG Michaels 12
- Pittsburgh – Sample 39 interception return (Layne kick)
- Dallas – Bieski 17 pass from Meredith (Green kick)
- Dallas – FG Green 27

=== Week 2 (Sunday September 24, 1961): New York Giants ===
	1	2	3	4	Total
Giants	0	7	10	0	17
Steelers	7	0	7	0	14

at Forbes Field, Pittsburgh, Pennsylvania

- Game time:
- Game weather:
- Game attendance: 35,587
- Referee:
- TV announcers:

Scoring Drives:

- Pittsburgh – Johnson 1 run (Tracy kick)
- New York Giants – Shofner 16 pass from Conerly (Summerall kick)
- New York Giants – FG Summerall 19
- New York Giants – Morrison 5 pass from Tittle (Summerall kick)
- Pittsburgh – Dial 4 pass from Layne (Tracy kick)

=== Week 3 (Sunday October 1, 1961): Los Angeles Rams ===
	1	2	3	4	Total
Steelers	0	14	0	0	14
Rams	7	7	0	10	24

at Los Angeles Memorial Coliseum, Los Angeles

- Game time:
- Game weather:
- Game attendance: 40,070
- Referee:
- TV announcers:

Scoring Drives:

- Los Angeles – Bratkowski 2 run (Villanueva kick)
- Pittsburgh – Dial 20 pass from Bukich (Layne kick)
- Pittsburgh – Johnson 5 run (Layne kick)
- Los Angeles – Phillips 15 pass from Ryan (Villanueva kick)
- Los Angeles – Matson 96 pass from Ryan (Villanueva kick)
- Los Angeles – FG Villanueva 15

=== Week 4 (Sunday October 8, 1961): Philadelphia Eagles ===
	1	2	3	4	Total
Steelers	3	7	0	6	16
Eagles	0	7	7	7	21

at Franklin Field, Philadelphia

- Game time:
- Game weather:
- Game attendance: 60,671
- Referee: George Rennix
- TV announcers:

Scoring Drives:

- Pittsburgh – FG Michaels 23
- PIttsburgh – Bukich 1 run (Michaels kick)
- Philadelphia – Retzlaff 17 pass from Jurgensen (Walston kick)
- Philadelphia – Peaks 1 run (Walston kick)
- Pittsburgh – Dial 13 pass from Bukich (kick failed)
- Philadelphia – Retzlaff 2 pass from Jurgensen (Walston kick)

=== Week 5 (Sunday October 15, 1961): Washington Redskins ===
	1	2	3	4	Total
Redskins	0	0	0	0	0
Steelers	17	0	0	3	20

at Forbes Field, Pittsburgh, Pennsylvania

- Game time:
- Game weather:
- Game attendance: 15,072
- Referee:
- TV announcers:

Scoring Drives:

- Pittsburgh – Carpenter 8 pass from Bukich (Michaels kick)
- Pittsburgh – Dial 23 pass from Bukich (Michaels kick)
- Pittsburgh – FG Michaels 13
- Pittsburgh – FG Michaels 36

=== Week 6 (Sunday October 22, 1961): Cleveland Browns ===
	1	2	3	4	Total
Browns	3	7	3	17	30
Steelers	0	0	14	14	28

at Forbes Field, Pittsburgh, Pennsylvania

- Game time:
- Game weather:
- Game attendance: 29,266
- Referee:
- TV announcers:

Scoring Drives:

- Cleveland – FG Groza 24
- Cleveland – Mitchell 6 run (Groza kick)
- Pittsburgh – Dial 12 pass from Bukich (Michaels kick)
- Pittsburgh – Tracy 1 run (Michaels kick)
- Cleveland – FG Groza 36
- Cleveland – Mitchell 9 run (Groza kick)
- Pittsburgh – Tracy 1 run (Michaels kick)
- Cleveland – Mitchell 18 run (Groza kick)
- Cleveland – FG Groza 12
- Pittsburgh – Dial 88 pass from Bukich (Michaels kick)

=== Week 7 (Sunday October 29, 1961): San Francisco 49ers ===
	1	2	3	4	Total
49ers	0	7	3	0	10
Steelers	17	0	3	0	20

at Forbes Field, Pittsburgh, Pennsylvania

- Game time:
- Game weather:
- Game attendance: 21,686
- Referee:
- TV announcers:

Scoring Drives:

- Pittsburgh – Johnson 30 run (Michaels kick)
- Pittsburgh – Tracy 11 pass from Bukich (Michaels kick)
- Pittsburgh – FG Michaels 16
- San Francisco – Stickles 50 pass from Brodie (Davis kick)
- San Francisco – FG Davis 20
- Pittsburgh – FG Michaels 24

=== Week 8 (Sunday November 5, 1961): Cleveland Browns ===
	1	2	3	4	Total
Steelers	0	0	10	7	17
Browns	7	0	3	3	13

at Cleveland Municipal Stadium, Cleveland, Ohio

- Game time:
- Game weather:
- Game attendance: 62,723
- Referee:
- TV announcers:

Scoring Drives:

- Cleveland – J. Brown 3 run
- Cleveland – FG Groza 27
- Pittsburgh – Bukich 1 run (Michaels kick)
- Pittsburgh – FG Michaels 10
- Cleveland – FG Groza 37
- Pittsburgh – Schnelker 26 pass from Bukich (Michaels kick)

=== Week 9 (Sunday November 12, 1961): Dallas Cowboys ===
	1	2	3	4	Total
Steelers	7	13	7	10	37
Cowboys	0	7	0	0	7

at Cotton Bowl, Dallas, Texas

- Game time:
- Game weather:
- Game attendance: 17,519
- Referee:
- TV announcers:

Scoring Drives:

- Pittsburgh – Johnson 1 run (Michaels kick)
- Pittsburgh – FG Michaels 28
- Dallas – Perkins 11 run (Green kick)
- Pittsburgh – FG Michaels 19
- Pittsburgh – Dial 73 pass from Bukich (Michaels kick)
- Pittsburgh – Butler 71 interception (Michaels kick)
- Pittsburgh – Dial 15 pass from Bikich (Michaels kick)
- Pittsburgh – FG Michaels 47

=== Week 10 (Sunday November 19, 1961): New York Giants ===
	1	2	3	4	Total
Giants	7	7	14	14	42
Steelers	7	0	0	14	21

at Forbes Field, Pittsburgh, Pennsylvania

- Game time:
- Game weather:
- Game attendance: 62,592
- Referee:
- TV announcers:

Scoring Drives:

- Pittsburgh – Dial 15 pass from Bukich (Michaels kick)
- New York Giants – Walton 9 pass from Tittle (Summerall kick)
- New York Giants – Gaiters 3 run (Summerall kick)
- New York Giants – Webster 23 pass from Tittle (Summerall kick)
- New York Giants – Rote 20 pass from Tittle (Summerall kick)
- New York Giants – Rote 9 pass from Gaiters (Summerall kick)
- Pittsburgh – Carpenter 13 pass from Hoak (Michaels kick)
- Pittsburgh – Dial 3 pass from Layne (Michaels kick)
- New York Giants – Webster 32 run (Summerall kick)

=== Week 11 (Sunday November 26, 1961): St. Louis Cardinals ===
	1	2	3	4	Total
Cardinals	13	0	0	14	27
Steelers	0	13	14	0	27

at Forbes Field, Pittsburgh, Pennsylvania

- Game time:
- Game weather:
- Game attendance: 17,090
- Referee:
- TV announcers:

Scoring Drives:

- St. Louis – Norton 47 interception return (kick failed)
- St. Louis – Randle 3 pass from Etcheverry (Perry kick)
- Pittsburgh – FG Michaels 18
- Pittsburgh – FG Michaels 36
- Pittsburgh – Schnelker 11 pass from Layne (Michaels kick)
- Pittsburgh – Sample 55 punt return (Michaels kick)
- Pittsburgh – Johnson 2 run (Michaels kick)
- St. Louis – Crow 61 pass from Guglielmi (Conrad kick)
- St. Louis – Norton 37 interception return (Conrad kick)
- Pittsburgh – FG Michaels 18

=== Week 12 (Sunday December 3, 1961): Philadelphia Eagles ===
	1	2	3	4	Total
Eagles	14	7	7	7	35
Steelers	7	3	7	7	24

at Forbes Field, Pittsburgh, Pennsylvania

- Game time:
- Game weather:
- Game attendance: 21,653
- Referee:
- TV announcers:

Scoring Drives:

- Philadelphia – Walston 17 pass from Jurgensen (Walston kick)
- Philadelphia – Peaks 1 run (Walston kick)
- Pittsburgh – Carpenter 7 pass from Layne (Michaels kick)
- Pittsburgh – FG Michaels 37
- Philadelphia – Lucas 7 pass from Jurgensen (Walston kick)
- Philadelphia – Brown 66 punt return (Walston kick)
- Pittsburgh – Johnson 7 pass from Layne (Michaels kick)
- Pittsburgh – Schnelker 8 pass from Layne (Michaels kick)
- Philadelphia – Brown 42 run (Walston kick)

=== Week 13 (Sunday December 10, 1961): Washington Redskins ===
	1	2	3	4	Total
Steelers	7	3	14	6	30
Redskins	0	7	0	7	14

at D.C. Stadium, Washington, D.C.

- Game time:
- Game weather:
- Game attendance: 21,134
- Referee:
- TV announcers:

Scoring Drives:

- Pittsburgh – Mack 10 pass from Layne (Michaels kick)
- Washington – Dugan 9 pass from Snead (Aveni kick)
- Pittsburgh – FG Michaels 42
- Pittsburgh – Carpenter 40 pass from Layne (Michaels kick)
- Pittsburgh – Mack 6 pass from Layne (Michaels kick)
- Washington – Dugan 11 pass from Izo (Aveni kick)
- Pittsburgh – Dial 5 pass from Layne (kick failed)

=== Week 14 (Sunday December 17, 1961): St. Louis Cardinals ===
	1	2	3	4	Total
Steelers	0	0	0	0	0
Cardinals	7	0	6	7	20

at Busch Stadium, St. Louis, Missouri

- Game time:
- Game weather:
- Game attendance: 16,298
- Referee:
- TV announcers:

Scoring Drives:

- St. Louis – Randle 3 pass from Etcheverry (Perry kick)
- St. Louis – Stacy 25 fumble run (kick failed)
- St. Louis – Crow 15 pass from Etcheverry (Perry kick)
