= 1960 Pittsburgh Steelers season =

NFL team season

- Owner: Art Rooney
- Head coach: Buddy Parker
- Home stadium: Forbes Field; Pitt Stadium

Results
- Record: 5–6–1
- Division place: 5th NFL Eastern
- Playoffs: Did not qualify

The 1960 Pittsburgh Steelers season was the franchise's 28th in the National Football League. They compiled a 5–6–1 record and a fifth-place finish under head coach Buddy Parker while playing their home games at Forbes Field and Pitt Stadium.

== Offseason ==
=== NFL draft ===
1960 Pittsburgh Steelers draft
| Round | Pick | Player | Position | College | Notes |
| 1 | 6 | Jack Spikes | Halfback | TCU | |
| 5 | 55 | Abner Haynes * | Halfback | North Texas State | |
| 7 | 76 | Leonard Wilson | Back | Purdue | |
| 7 | 78 | Lonnie Dennis | Guard | BYU | |
| 8 | 90 | Dan Lanphear | Defensive end | Wisconsin | |
Made roster * Made at least one Pro Bowl during career

== Roster ==
1960 Pittsburgh Steelers roster
| Quarterbacks (QB): 10 Rudy Bukich; 22 Bobby Layne K; Running backs (RB): 35 John Henry Johnson; 28 Rex Johnston; 39 Larry Krutko; 34 Charley Scales; 30 Tom Tracy K; Wide receivers (WR): 84 Buddy Dial; 86 Jimmy Orr; Tight ends (TE): 88 Pete Brewster; 40 Preston Carpenter | Offensive linemen (OL): 72 Byron Beams T; 57 Ed Beatty C; 55 Dan James T; 76 Ken Longenecker T; 65 John Nisby G; 62 Mike Sandusky G; 68 Ron Stehouwer G/T; 74 Frank Varrichione T; Defensive linemen (DL): 64 John Kapele DE; 75 Joe Krupa DT; 71 Joe Lewis DT; 73 Will Renfro DE; 77 Billy Ray Smith DE; 70 Ernie Stautner DT/DE; 82 George Tarasovic DE/OLB | Linebackers (LB): 66 Dick Campbell OLB; 36 Rudy Hayes OLB; 50 John Reger OLB/MLB; 37 Mike Henry MLB; Defensive backs (DB): 43 Tom Barnett CB; 27 Dean Derby CB; 47 Dicky Moegle CB/FS; 20 Jack Morris SS; 24 Fred Williamson SS; 42 Junior Wren FS; Special teams (ST): 89 Bobby Joe Green P | Reserve: 44 Bert Rechichar (IR) CB/LB/K; 26 Joe Scudero S (Retired); Rookies in italics |

== Preseason ==
Among the Steelers' preseason games in 1960 was an exhibition match with the Toronto Argonauts of the Canadian Football League; the Steelers won handily, 43–16. Forty-eight years later, the Steelers returned to Toronto to face the Buffalo Bills as the first game in the Toronto Series, played on August 14th, 2008, and in which the Steelers lost to the Bills by a score of 24–21.

== Regular season ==
=== Schedule ===
| Week | Date | Opponent | Result | Record | Venue |
|---|---|---|---|---|---|
| 1 | September 24 | at Dallas Cowboys | W 35–28 | 1–0 | Cotton Bowl |
| 2 | October 2 | at Cleveland Browns | L 20–28 | 1–1 | Cleveland Municipal Stadium |
| 3 | October 9 | New York Giants | L 17–19 | 1–2 | Pitt Stadium |
| 4 | October 16 | St. Louis Cardinals | W 27–14 | 2–2 | Forbes Field |
| 5 | October 23 | at Washington Redskins | T 27–27 | 2–2–1 | Griffith Stadium |
| 6 | October 30 | Green Bay Packers | L 13–19 | 2–3–1 | Forbes Field |
| 7 | November 6 | at Philadelphia Eagles | L 7–34 | 2–4–1 | Franklin Field |
| 8 | November 13 | at New York Giants | L 24–27 | 2–5–1 | Yankee Stadium |
| 9 | November 20 | Cleveland Browns | W 14–10 | 3–5–1 | Forbes Field |
| 10 | November 27 | Washington Redskins | W 22–10 | 4–5–1 | Forbes Field |
| 11 | Bye | | | | |
| 12 | December 11 | Philadelphia Eagles | W 27–21 | 5–5–1 | Forbes Field |
| 13 | December 18 | at St. Louis Cardinals | L 7–38 | 5–6–1 | Busch Stadium |

- Saturday night (September 24)
- A bye week was necessary in 1960, as the league expanded to an odd-number (13) of teams (Dallas); one team was idle each week.

=== Game summaries ===
==== Week 1 (Saturday September 24, 1960): Dallas Cowboys ====
| | 1 | 2 | 3 | 4 | Total |
|---|---|---|---|---|---|
| Steelers | 7 | 7 | 14 | 7 | 35 |
| Cowboys | 14 | 7 | 7 | 0 | 28 |

at Cotton Bowl, Dallas, Texas

- Game time:
- Game weather:
- Game attendance: 30,000
- Referee:
- TV announcers:
- Dallas – Doran 75 pass from LeBaron (Cone kick)
- Dallas – Dugan 7 pass from Lebaron (Cone kick)
- Pittsburgh – Carpenter 28 pass from Layne (Layne kick)
- Dallas – McIlhenny 5 run (Cone kick)
- Pittsburgh – Orr 6 pass from Layne (Layne kick)
- Pittsburgh – Dial 70 pass from Tracy (Layne kick)
- Dallas – Doran 54 pass from LeBaron (Cone kick)
- Pittsburgh – Carpenter 49 pass from Layne (Layne kick)
- Pittsburgh – Tracy 65 pass from Layne (Layne kick)

Scoring Drives:

==== Week 2 (Sunday October 2, 1960): Cleveland Browns ====
| | 1 | 2 | 3 | 4 | Total |
|---|---|---|---|---|---|
| Steelers | 0 | 0 | 7 | 13 | 20 |
| Browns | 7 | 14 | 0 | 7 | 28 |

at Cleveland Municipal Stadium, Cleveland, Ohio

- Game time:
- Game weather:
- Game attendance: 67,692
- Referee:
- TV announcers:

Scoring Drives:

- Cleveland – Plum 1 run (Baker kick)
- Cleveland – Mitchell 5 run (Baker kick)
- Cleveland – Kreitling 60 pass from Plum (Baker kick)
- Pittsburgh – Tracy 40 pass from Layne (Layne kick)
- Pittsburgh – Tracy 1 run (kick failed)
- Cleveland – Brown 2 run (Baker kick)
- Pittsburgh – Dial 3 pass from Layne (Rechichar kick)

==== Week 3 (Sunday October 9, 1960): New York Giants ====
| | 1 | 2 | 3 | 4 | Total |
|---|---|---|---|---|---|
| Giants | 0 | 12 | 0 | 7 | 19 |
| Steelers | 7 | 0 | 7 | 3 | 17 |

program

at Forbes Field, Pittsburgh, Pennsylvania

- Game time:
- Game weather:
- Game attendance: 40,323
- Referee:
- TV announcers:

Scoring Drives:

- Pittsburgh – Orr 22 pass from Tracy (Rechichar kick)
- New York Giants – FG Summerall 41
- New York Giants – Safety, Johnson tackled in end zone by Grier
- New York Giants – Rote 9 pass from Shaw (Summerall kick)
- Pittsburgh – Dial 30 pass from Layne (Rechichar kick)
- Pittsburgh – FG Rechichar 11
- New York Giants – Gifford 44 pass from Conerly (Summerall kick)

==== Week 4 (Sunday October 16, 1960): St. Louis Cardinals ====
| | 1 | 2 | 3 | 4 | Total |
|---|---|---|---|---|---|
| Cardinals | 0 | 0 | 0 | 14 | 14 |
| Steelers | 6 | 7 | 7 | 7 | 27 |

at Forbes Field, Pittsburgh, Pennsylvania

- Game time:
- Game weather:
- Game attendance: 22,971
- Referee:
- TV announcers:

Scoring Drives:

- Pittsburgh – FG Rechichar 42
- Pittsburgh – FG Rechichar 31
- Pittsburgh – Tracy 4 run (Rechichar kick)
- Pittsburgh – Dial 26 pass from Layne (Rechichar kick)
- St. Louis – Crow 6 run (Conrad kick)
- St. Louis – Mestnik 2 run (Conrad kick)
- Pittsburgh – Orr 51 pass from Tracy (Rechichar kick)

==== Week 5 (Sunday October 23, 1960): Washington Redskins ====
| | 1 | 2 | 3 | 4 | Total |
|---|---|---|---|---|---|
| Steelers | 7 | 3 | 7 | 10 | 27 |
| Redskins | 7 | 3 | 7 | 10 | 27 |

at Griffith Stadium, Washington, DC

- Game time:
- Game weather:
- Game attendance: 25,292
- Referee:
- TV announcers:

Scoring Drives:

- Washington – Olszewski 1 run (Khayat kick)
- Pittsburgh – Tracy 5 pass from Bukich (Layne kick)
- Washington – FG Khayat 15
- Pittsburgh – FG Layne 17
- Pittsburgh – Lewis recovered fumble in end zone (Layne kick)
- Washington – Walton 35 pass from Guglielmi (Khayat kick)
- Washington – Anderson 12 pass from Guglielmi (Khayat kick)
- Pittsburgh – FG Layne 15
- Pittsburgh – Dial 27 pass from Bukich (Layne kick)
- Washington – FG Khayat 43

==== Week 6 (Sunday October 30, 1960): Green Bay Packers ====
| | 1 | 2 | 3 | 4 | Total |
|---|---|---|---|---|---|
| Packers | 9 | 3 | 0 | 7 | 19 |
| Steelers | 0 | 7 | 0 | 6 | 13 |

at Forbes Field, Pittsburgh, Pennsylvania

- Game time:
- Game weather:
- Game attendance: 30,155
- Referee:
- TV announcers:

Scoring Drives:

- Green Bay – FG Hornung 35
- Green Bay – FG Hornung 35
- Green Bay – FG Hornung 45
- Green Bay – FG Hornung 17
- Pittsburgh – Tracy 37 pass from Layne (Layne kick)
- Pittsburgh – Dial 48 pass from Layne (pass failed)
- Green Bay – Taylor 1 run (Hornung kick)

==== Week 7 (Sunday November 6, 1960): Philadelphia Eagles ====
| | 1 | 2 | 3 | 4 | Total |
|---|---|---|---|---|---|
| Steelers | 0 | 0 | 0 | 7 | 7 |
| Eagles | 14 | 3 | 7 | 10 | 34 |

at Franklin Field, Philadelphia, Pennsylvania

- Game time:
- Game weather:
- Game attendance: 58,324
- Referee: John Pace
- TV announcers:

Scoring Drives:

- Philadelphia – Barnes 9 run (Walston kick)
- Philadelphia – McDonald 24 pass from Van Brocklin (Walston kick)
- Philadelphia – FG Walston 21
- Philadelphia – McDonald 39 pass from Van Brocklin (Walston kick)
- Philadelphia – FG Walston 11
- Pittsburgh – Dial 50 pass from Tracy (Layne kick)
- Philadelphia – McDonald 26 pass from Van Brocklin (Walston kick)

==== Week 8 (Sunday November 13, 1960): New York Giants ====
| | 1 | 2 | 3 | 4 | Total |
|---|---|---|---|---|---|
| Steelers | 14 | 10 | 0 | 0 | 24 |
| Giants | 7 | 7 | 3 | 10 | 27 |

at Yankee Stadium, Bronx, New York

- Game time:
- Game weather:
- Game attendance: 63,321
- Referee:
- TV announcers:

Scoring Drives:

- Pittsburgh – Layne 1 run (Layne kick)
- Pittsburgh – Tracy 1 run (Layne kick)
- New York Giants – Gifford 6 run (Summerall kick)
- Pittsburgh – FG Layne 10
- Pittsburgh – Dial 7 pass from Layne (Layne kick)
- New York Giants – Gifford 57 pass from Conerly (Summerall kick)
- New York Giants – FG Summerall 43
- New York Giants – Gifford 27 pass from Conerly (Summerall kick)
- New York Giants – FG Summerall 37

==== Week 9 (Sunday November 20, 1960): Cleveland Browns ====
| | 1 | 2 | 3 | 4 | Total |
|---|---|---|---|---|---|
| Browns | 0 | 0 | 3 | 7 | 10 |
| Steelers | 7 | 0 | 0 | 7 | 14 |

at Forbes Field, Pittsburgh, Pennsylvania

- Game time:
- Game weather:
- Game attendance: 35,215
- Referee:
- TV announcers:

Scoring Drives:

- Pittsburgh – Johnson 3 run (Layne kick)
- Cleveland – FG Baker 19
- Cleveland Kreitling 6 pass from Plum (Baker kick)
- Pittsburgh – Tracy 4 run (Layne kick)

==== Week 10 (Sunday November 27, 1960): Washington Redskins ====
| | 1 | 2 | 3 | 4 | Total |
|---|---|---|---|---|---|
| Redskins | 0 | 0 | 7 | 3 | 10 |
| Steelers | 6 | 7 | 3 | 6 | 22 |

at Forbes Field, Pittsburgh, Pennsylvania

- Game time:
- Game weather:
- Game attendance: 22,234
- Referee:
- TV announcers:

Scoring Drives:

- Pittsburgh – FG Tracy 37
- Pittsburgh – FG Tracy 31
- Pittsburgh – Tracy 28 run (Layne kick)
- Washington – James 49 pass from Guolielmi (Khayat kick)
- Pittsburgh – FG Layne 23
- Washington – FG Khayat 9
- Pittsburgh – FG Tracy 28
- Pittsburgh – FG Layne 11

==== Week 12 (Sunday December 11, 1960): Philadelphia Eagles ====
| | 1 | 2 | 3 | 4 | Total |
|---|---|---|---|---|---|
| Eagles | 0 | 0 | 0 | 21 | 21 |
| Steelers | 13 | 14 | 0 | 0 | 27 |

at Forbes Field, Pittsburgh, Pennsylvania

- Game time:
- Game weather:
- Game attendance: 22,101
- Referee:
- TV announcers:

Scoring Drives:

- Pittsburgh – Layne 6 run (Layne kick)
- Pittsburgh – Johnson 7 pass from Layne (kick failed)
- Pittsburgh – Johnson 87 run (Layne kick)
- Pittsburgh – Dial 15 pass from Johnson (Layne kick)
- Philadelphia – Brown 53 pass from Jurgensen (Walston kick)
- Philadelphia – Brown 7 run (Walston kick)
- Philadelphia – McDonald 19 pass from Jurgensen (Walston kick)

==== Week 13 (Sunday December 18, 1960): St. Louis Cardinals ====
| | 1 | 2 | 3 | 4 | Total |
|---|---|---|---|---|---|
| Steelers | 0 | 7 | 0 | 0 | 7 |
| Cardinals | 0 | 7 | 17 | 14 | 38 |

at Busch Stadium I, St. Louis, Missouri

- Game time:
- Game weather:
- Game attendance: 20,840
- Referee:
- TV announcers:

Scoring Drives:

- St. Louis – Mestnik 1 run (Perry kick)
- Pittsburgh – Orr 49 pass from Layne (Layne kick)
- St. Louis – FG Perry 16
- St. Louis – Randle 14 pass from Roach (Perry kick)
- St. Louis – Randle 8 pass from Roach (Perry kick)
- St. Louis – Roach 1 run (Perry kick)
- St. Louis – Randle 33 pass from Roach (Perry kick)

=== Standings ===
NFL Eastern Conference
| | W | L | T | PCT | CONF | PF | PA | STK |
|---|---|---|---|---|---|---|---|---|
| Philadelphia Eagles | 10 | 2 | 0 | .833 | 8–2 | 321 | 246 | W1 |
| Cleveland Browns | 8 | 3 | 1 | .727 | 6–3–1 | 362 | 217 | W3 |
| New York Giants | 6 | 4 | 2 | .600 | 5–4–1 | 271 | 261 | L1 |
| St. Louis Cardinals | 6 | 5 | 1 | .545 | 4–5–1 | 288 | 230 | W1 |
| Pittsburgh Steelers | 5 | 6 | 1 | .455 | 4–5–1 | 240 | 275 | L1 |
| Washington Redskins | 1 | 9 | 2 | .100 | 0–8–2 | 178 | 309 | L8 |

Note: Tie games were not officially counted in the standings until 1972.
