= 1961 New York Giants season =

NFL team season

- Owner: Jack Mara; Wellington Mara
- Head coach: Allie Sherman
- Home stadium: Yankee Stadium

Results
- Record: 10–3–1
- Division place: 1st NFL Eastern
- Playoffs: Lost NFL Championship (at Packers) 0–37

The 1961 New York Giants season was the franchise's 37th season in the National Football League. After relinquishing the NFL East title the previous season, the Giants reclaimed the title with a 10–3–1 record, a half-game ahead of the defending champion Philadelphia Eagles.

New York traveled to Wisconsin for the NFL Championship Game and were shut out 37–0 by the Vince Lombardi-coached Green Bay Packers.

This was the first season that the now famous lowercase "ny" logo appeared on the helmets.

== Off-season ==
=== NFL draft ===
1961 New York Giants draft
Round	Pick	Player	Position	College	Notes
2	17	Bob Gaiters	Running back	New Mexico State	
2	25	Bruce Tarbox	Guard	Syracuse	
Made roster

=== Undrafted free agents ===
1961 undrafted free agents of note
Player	Position	College
Bubba Marriott	Quarterback	Troy

== Roster ==
1961 New York Giants roster
Quarterbacks (QB): 42 Charlie Conerly; 11 Lee Grosscup; 14 Y. A. Tittle; Running backs (RB): 35 Bob Gaiters; 24 Phil King; 40 Joe Morrison SS; 29 Alex Webster; 28 Joel Wells; Wide receivers (WR): 44 Kyle Rote; 85 Del Shofner; Tight ends (TE): 12 Pete Hall; 80 Joe Walton	Offensive linemen (OL): 79 Rosey Brown T; 62 Darrell Dess G; 72 Charlie Janerette T; 53 Greg Larson T; 61 Zeke Smith G; 66 Jack Stroud G; 65 Mickey Walker G; 55 Ray Wietecha C; Defensive linemen (DL): 76 Rosey Grier DT; 75 Jim Katcavage DE; 77 Dick Modzelewski DT; 81 Andy Robustelli DE	Linebackers (LB): 52 Larry Hayes OLB; 70 Sam Huff MLB; 89 Cliff Livingston OLB; 82 Tom Scott OLB; 83 Bob Simms MLB; Defensive backs (DB): 49 Erich Barnes CB; 41 Gene Johnson CB; 22 Dick Lynch CB; 20 Jimmy Patton FS; 21 Allan Webb SS/RB; Special teams (ST): 34 Don Chandler P; 88 Pat Summerall K	Practice squad: Clarence Childs RB; Glen Knight WR; Bubba Marriott QB; Reserve: 25 Dick Nolan S (IR); -- Jim Podoley RB (IR); 48 Bill Stits CB (IR); Rookies in italics

== Regular season ==
=== Schedule ===
Week	Date	Opponent	Result	Record	Attendance
1	September 17	St. Louis Cardinals	L 10–21	0–1	58,059
2	September 24	at Pittsburgh Steelers	W 17–14	1–1	35,587
3	October 1	at Washington Redskins	W 24–21	2–1	36,767
4	October 8	at St. Louis Cardinals	W 24–9	3–1	23,713
5	October 15	at Dallas Cowboys	W 31–10	4–1	41,500
6	October 22	Los Angeles Rams	W 24–14	5–1	63,053
7	October 29	Dallas Cowboys	L 16–17	5–2	60,254
8	November 5	Washington Redskins	W 53–0	6–2	56,077
9	November 12	Philadelphia Eagles	W 38–21	7–2	62,800
10	November 19	Pittsburgh Steelers	W 42–21	8–2	62,592
11	November 26	at Cleveland Browns	W 37–21	9–2	80,455
12	December 3	at Green Bay Packers	L 17–20	9–3	47,012
13	December 10	at Philadelphia Eagles	W 28–24	10–3	60,671
14	December 17	Cleveland Browns	T 7–7	10–3–1	61,804

=== Game summaries ===
==== Week 2 ====
Team	1	2	3	4	Total
• Giants	0	7	10	0	17
Steelers	7	0	7	0	14

- Date: September 24
- Location: Pitt Stadium, Pittsburgh, Pennsylvania
- Game weather: 74 °F (23 °C), wind 5 mph (8 km/h)

Scoring summary
1	PIT	John Henry Johnson 1 yard run (Tom Tracy kick)	Steelers 7–0
2	NYG	Del Shofner 16 yard pass from Charlie Conerly (Pat Summerall kick)	Tie 7–7
3	NYG	Pat Summerall 19 yard field goal	Giants 10–7
3	NYG	Joe Morrison 5 yard pass from Y.A. Tittle (Pat Summerall kick)	Giants 17–7
3	PIT	Buddy Dial 4 yard pass from Bobby Layne (Tom Tracy kick)	Giants 17–14

=== Standings ===
NFL Eastern Conference
	W	L	T	PCT	CONF	PF	PA	STK
New York Giants	10	3	1	.769	9–2–1	368	220	T1
Philadelphia Eagles	10	4	0	.714	8–4	361	297	W1
Cleveland Browns	8	5	1	.615	8–3–1	319	270	T1
St. Louis Cardinals	7	7	0	.500	7–5	279	267	W3
Pittsburgh Steelers	6	8	0	.429	5–7	295	287	L1
Dallas Cowboys	4	9	1	.308	2–9–1	236	380	L4
Washington Redskins	1	12	1	.077	1–10–1	174	392	W1

Note: Tie games were not officially counted in the standings until 1972.

NFL Western Conference
	W	L	T	PCT	CONF	PF	PA	STK
Green Bay Packers	11	3	0	.786	9–3	391	223	W1
Detroit Lions	8	5	1	.615	7–4–1	270	258	L1
Chicago Bears	8	6	0	.571	7–5	326	302	W2
Baltimore Colts	8	6	0	.571	6–6	302	307	W1
San Francisco 49ers	7	6	1	.538	6–5–1	346	272	L1
Los Angeles Rams	4	10	0	.286	3–9	263	333	L1
Minnesota Vikings	3	11	0	.214	3–9	285	407	L2

Note: Tie games were not officially counted in the standings until 1972.

== Playoffs ==
Round	Date	Opponent	Time	TV	Result	Game Site	Attendance	Recap
NFL Championship	December 31	at Green Bay Packers	2:00 p.m. EST	NBC	L 0–37	City Stadium	39,029	Recap

Playoff Game Officials

Playoff
Round	Opponent	Referee	Umpire	Head Linesman	Back Judge	Field Judge
NFL Championship Game	at Green Bay	(#52) George Rennix	(#17) James Beiersdorfer	(#48) John Highberger	(#22) Charles Sweeney	(#14) Frank Luzar

=== Playoff game summaries ===
==== 1961 NFL Championship Game (Sunday, December 31, 1961): at Green Bay Packers ====
1961 NFL Championship Game: New York Giants at Green Bay Packers – Game summary

Quarter	1	2	3	4	Total
Giants	0	0	0	0	0
Packers	0	24	10	3	37

at City Stadium • Green Bay, Wisconsin

- Date: December 31
- Game time: 2:00 p.m. EST
- Game weather: 17 °F (−8 °C), relative humidity 82%, wind 10 mph (16 km/h), wind chill 6 °F (−14 °C)
- Game attendance: 39,029
- Referee: George Rennix
- TV announcers (NBC): Lindsey Nelson and Chris Schenkel

Team	Category	Player	Statistics
NYG	Passing		
NYG	Rushing		
NYG	Receiving		
GB	Passing		
GB	Rushing		
GB	Receiving		

Scoring summary

Quarter	Time	Drive			Team	Scoring information	Score	
Quarter	Time	Plays	Yards	TOP	Team	Scoring information	NYG	GB
2					Packers	Hornung 6-yard touchdown run, Hornung kick good	0	7
2					Packers	Dowler 13-yard touchdown reception from Starr, Hornung kick good	0	14
2					Packers	Kramer 14-yard touchdown reception from Starr, Hornung kick good	0	21
2					Packers	17-yard field goal by Hornung	0	24
3					Packers	22-yard field goal by Hornung	0	27
3					Packers	Kramer 13-yard touchdown reception from Starr, Hornung kick good	0	34
4					Packers	19-yard field goal by Hornung	0	37
"TOP" = time of possession. For other American football terms, see Glossary of American football.							0	37

- Point spread: Giants +3½
- Time of game:

Giants	Game statistics	Packers
6	First downs	19
14–31	Rushes–yards	44–181
119	Passing yards	164
10–29–4	Passes	10–19–0
2–20	Sacked–yards	0–0
99	Net passing yards	164
130	Total yards	345
129	Return yards	58
5–39.2	Punts	5–42.0
5–1	Fumbles–lost	1–0
4–38	Penalties–yards	4–16
	Time of possession	

Individual stats

Giants Passing
	C/ATT^{1}	Yds	TD	INT	Sk	Yds	LG^{3}	Rate
Tittle	6/20	65	0	4	2	15	19	1.0
Conerly	4/8	54	0	0	1	5	35	71.9
Gaiters	0/1	0	0	0	0	0	0	39.6

Giants Rushing
Car^{2}	Yds	TD	LG^{3}

Giants Receiving
Rec^{4}	Yds	TD	LG^{3}

Giants Kickoff Returns
Ret	Yds	Y/Rt	TD	Lng

Giants Punt Returns
Ret	Yds	Y/Rt	TD	Lng

Giants Punting
Pnt	Yds	Y/P	Lng	Blck

Starting Lineups

Position	Starting Lineups at Green Bay (1961 NFL Championship Game)
Offense
FL	#44 Kyle Rote
LT	#79 Rosey Brown
LG	#62 Darrell Dess
C	#55 Ray Wietecha
RG	#66 Jack Stroud
RT	#53 Greg Larson
TE	#80 Joe Walton
SE	#85 Del Shofner
QB	#14 Y. A. Tittle
FB	#29 Alex Webster
LH	#28 Joel Wells
Defense
LDE
LDT
RDT
RDE
LLB
MLB
RLB
LCB
RCB
SS
FS

== See also ==
- List of New York Giants seasons
