= Pittsburgh Steelers Legends team =

Group of the best pre-1970 era Pittsburgh Steeler players

The Pittsburgh Steelers Legends team represents the franchise's best players from the pre-1970 era. The team was chosen by a small group of Steeler officials and journalists and presented as a part of the Steelers' 75th season celebration in 2007. The club also presented an updated and expanded All-Time team at the same time, which was determined on the basis of fan voting.

While the All-Time team represented the top 33 players in the team's first 75 years, club officials recognized that the All-Time team was selected by fans who had a natural bias toward choosing more recent players due to the team's poor record prior to 1970, and the fact that many Steelers fans would never have seen the older players perform.

As such, many noteworthy players from the team's first four decades were overlooked. The Legends team was created to address this oversight, with Steelers Chairman Dan Rooney saying "There were a lot of great Steelers prior to 1970 who were as good as today's superstars, but fewer people got to see them play. We are looking forward to welcoming the Legends Team and having today's fans see some of the great Steelers from the pre-1970 era."

The eight-person selection committee that named the Legends team included Dan Rooney, Steelers Vice President Art Rooney Jr., team scout Bill Nunn, former long-time coach Dick Hoak, long-time Steelers broadcaster Myron Cope, former sports editor of the Pittsburgh Press Roy McHugh, and former team officials Joe Gordon and Ed Kiely. This panel chose the top 24 players in the club's pre-1970 history: eleven on offense, eleven on defense, one punter, and one placekicker.

== Offense ==
Position	Jersey No.	Player	Years on Team	# of Pro Bowls	Hall of Fame	Honors	Ref.
Quarterback	22	Bobby Layne	1958–1962	6	Yes	1950s All-Decade Team	
Running back	42	Dick Hoak	1961–1971	1	No		
Running back	35	John Henry Johnson	1960–1965	4	Yes		
Wide receiver	87	Roy Jefferson	1965–1969	3	No	1969 Steelers MVP	
Wide receiver	25	Ray Mathews	1951–1959	2	No		
Tight end	81	Elbie Nickel	1947–1957	3	No		
Center	21	Chuck Cherundolo	1941–1942, 1945–1948	2	No		
Guard	62	Mike Sandusky	1957–1965	1	No		
Guard	66	Bruce Van Dyke	1967–1973	1	No		
Tackle	71	Charlie Bradshaw	1961–1966	2	No		
Tackle	74	Frank Varrichione	1955–1960	5	No		

== Defense ==
Position	Jersey No.	Player	Years on Team	# of Pro Bowls	Hall of Fame	Honors	Ref.
Defensive tackle	76	Eugene Lipscomb	1961–1962	3	No^{[a]}		
Defensive tackle	70	Ernie Stautner	1950–1963	9	Yes	1950s All-Decade Team	
Defensive end	60	Ben McGee	1964–1972	2	No		
Defensive end	84	Bill McPeak	1949–1957	3	No		
Linebacker	60	Dale Dodrill	1951–1959	4	No		
Linebacker	66	Myron Pottios	1961, 1963–1965	3	No		
Linebacker	33	Jerry Shipkey	1948–1952	3	No		
Defensive back	80	Jack Butler	1951–1959	4	Yes	1950s All-Decade Team	
Defensive back	35	Bill Dudley	1942, 1945–1946	3	Yes	1946 NFL MVP; 1940s All-Decade Team	
Defensive back	11	Howard Hartley	1949–1952	-	No		
Defensive back	28	Clendon Thomas	1962–1968	1	No		

== Specialists ==
Position	Jersey No.	Player	Years on Team	# of Pro Bowls	Hall of Fame	Honors	Ref.
Placekicker	17	Armand Niccolai	1934–1942	-	No		
Punter	18	Pat Brady	1952–1954	-	No		

== Notes ==
Names in bold indicate the player spent his entire playing career with the Steelers.
^{a} Finalist in 1970 & 1977
