= Multilateral =

Multilateral may refer to:

- Multilateralism
- Multilateration
- Flea flicker (American football)
