= Joe Lewis (American football) =

American football player (born 1936)

No. 71, 72
- Position: Defensive tackle

Personal information
- Born: January 23, 1936 (age 90); Los Angeles, California, U.S.
- Listed height: 6 ft 2 in (1.88 m)
- Listed weight: 256 lb (116 kg)

Career information
- High school: David Starr Jordan (Los Angeles)
- College: Compton JC
- NFL draft: 1958: 17th round, 199th overall pick

Career history
- Pittsburgh Steelers (1958–1960); Baltimore Colts (1961); Philadelphia Eagles (1962)

Career NFL statistics
- Fumble recoveries: 4
- Interceptions: 1
- Sacks: 3.5
- Stats at Pro Football Reference

Joseph Lewis (born January 23, 1936) is an American former professional football player who was a defensive tackle for five seasons in the National Football League (NFL) with the Pittsburgh Steelers, Baltimore Colts, and Philadelphia Eagles. He played college football for Compton Junior College and was selected by the Steelers in the 17th round of the 1958 NFL draft.

== Biography ==
A native of Los Angeles, Lewis attended David Starr Jordan High School before playing college football at Compton Junior College. After his graduation from college, Lewis was selected in the 17th round (199th overall) of the 1958 NFL draft by the Pittsburgh Steelers. He played three seasons for them, from 1958 to 1960, appearing in thirty-four games.

In July 1961, Lewis joined the Baltimore Colts along with star wide receiver Jimmy Orr and linebacker Dick Campbell in a trade which sent All-Pro defensive tackle Gene "Big Daddy" Lipscomb and center Buzz Nutter to Pittsburgh. He would play just one season for the team, missing the last three games due to an ankle injury sustained in an automobile accident.

Lewis finished his career with the Philadelphia Eagles in 1962.

Lewis appeared in 58 total games in his career, starting 31, and recorded 3.5 unofficial sacks. He also scored one touchdown in 1960 on a fumble return.
