= Jimmy Orr =

American football player (1935–2020)

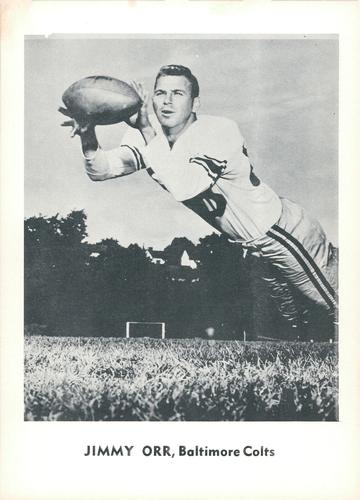
- circa 1961

No. 44, 86, 28
- Position: Wide receiver

Personal information
- Born: October 4, 1935; Seneca, South Carolina, U.S.
- Died: October 27, 2020 (aged 85); Brunswick, Georgia, U.S.
- Listed height: 5 ft 11 in (1.80 m)
- Listed weight: 185 lb (84 kg)

Career information
- High school: Seneca
- College: Wake Forest; Clemson (1953); Georgia (1954–1957)
- NFL draft: 1957: 25th round, 291st overall pick

Career history

Playing
- Los Angeles Rams (1958)*; Pittsburgh Steelers (1958–1960); Baltimore Colts (1961–1970)
- * Offseason or practice squad member only

Coaching
- Atlanta Falcons (1974–1975) Receivers coach

Awards and highlights
- Super Bowl champion (V); NFL champion (1968); First-team All-Pro (1965); 2× Second-team All-Pro (1958, 1959); 2× Pro Bowl (1959, 1965); AP NFL Rookie of the Year (1958); UPI NFL Rookie of the Year (1958)

Career NFL statistics
- Receptions: 400
- Receiving yards: 7,914
- Receiving touchdowns: 66
- Rushing yards: 122
- Stats at Pro Football Reference

James Edward Orr Jr. (October 4, 1935 – October 27, 2020) was an American professional football player who was a wide receiver in the National Football League (NFL) for 13 seasons, running from 1958 to 1970.

The speedy Orr was an unrecruited walk-on at the University of Georgia in 1955 and was touted along with a fellow sophomore halfback mate as "Zip Kids." It quickly became clear that Orr's forte was as a pass receiver rather than a runner, however, and he was cast in the role of flanker in the offense.

Drafted in the late rounds by the Los Angeles Rams in the 1957 NFL draft, Orr was traded to the Pittsburgh Steelers ahead of his debut 1958 season. There as a split end he set team records en route to selection as the 1958 NFL Rookie of the Year in both the Associated Press and United Press International polls. He was traded to the Baltimore Colts ahead of the 1961 NFL season.

Orr played ten years in Baltimore and became a fan favorite, with the corner of the end zone of Memorial Stadium where he caught many of his passes nicknamed "Orrsville." He retired a Super Bowl champion after the 1970 season.

== Biography ==
=== Early life ===
Jimmy Orr was born October 4, 1935, in Seneca, South Carolina. His father, James Orr Sr., was a prominent doctor in the small community.

He attended Seneca High School where he was a star basketball player, averaging 19 points a game over his last two years and earning All-State Class A honors.

Orr only played one year of high school football, starting at quarterback. Injuries had prevented him from playing more — a broken arm one year and a broken leg another.

Despite his limited ability to get on the field, Orr's footspeed was impressive. "I had lots of scholarship offers," Orr later claimed, "but I decided to go to school to study — I wasn't going to play football at all."

=== College career ===
Orr initially enrolled at Clemson College, the state land-grant university for whites in his home state of South Carolina, paying his own tuition.

"I guess it was family pressure that got me into that — but I spent one semester there and quit," he recalled.

A desire for athletic competition remained. He had his uncle speak with a friend who was the University of Georgia's former trainer, Neal Alford. Alford encouraged Orr to try to make the Bulldogs as a walk-on.

Speedy sophomore halfbacks J.B. Davis (L) and Jimmy Orr were dubbed "The Zip Kids" by the local press in the fall of 1955.

In the spring of 1955 Orr transferred to Georgia and walked on a spring practice. He was not only impressive enough carrying the ball at halfback that he not only made the Georgia team in 1955 but was offered an athletic scholarship beginning in 1956.

As an incoming sophomore who had never played collegiate football elsewhere, Orr was immediately eligible to play for the Georgia varsity team. He began fall practice as the #2 right halfback on the depth chart.

The situation clarified by the time of the September 17 opener against Ole Miss. Orr's erstwhile competitor at right halfback, sophomore J.B. Davis, was moved to left halfback and the two speedy youngsters were paired in a backfield immediately nicknamed "The Zip Kids" by the press. Although Georgia came up on the short end of a 26–13 score in the opener, a 27-yard pass from quarterback Dick Young to Orr set up a 46-yard aerial strike to Orr — and excitement ensued.

Orr's output in 1955 proved to be most peculiar, however. Although playing in all 10 of Georgia's games as a "halfback," he would carry the ball only 23 times, being limited to just 51 yards — a paltry average of 2.2 yards per carry. Yardage gained through the air was quite another matter, however, with Orr snaring 43 passes for 443 yards and 3 touchdowns — an impressive average of 18.5 yards per catch. Orr was quickly evolving into a "flanker back" — effectively the third receiver in a three end offense. He would make his mark in the NFL at wide receiver, not as a running back.

Orr would receive a Bachelor of Arts degree from Georgia in 1958.

=== Professional career ===
==== Los Angeles Rams ====
Jimmy Orr almost missed selection in the 1957 NFL draft, eventually taken by the Los Angeles Rams in the 25th round of the 30 round draft with the 291st pick overall. Orr signed his contract with the Rams at the end of June 1958.

College football reverted to the single platoon system for economic reasons in 1953 so at Georgia Orr saw game time both as a flanker on the offense and a defensive halfback on the other side of the ball. Intrigued by his speed but aware of the physical limitations of his slender body type in the violent NFL game, head coach [Sid Gillman] and the Rams attempted to cast Orr as a defensive back at the pro level. The experiment would prove short-lived.

Injuries to their ends force Gillman to move Orr to the offense in the last preseason game, a contest against the Pittsburgh Steelers. The speedburner got clear for a pass from Rams quarterback Frank Ryan, with Orr motoring for a 72-yard touchdown to close out scoring in a 31–6 Rams win. Notice was taken on the losing sideline.

On September 24, shortly ahead of start of the 1958 NFL season, Orr was traded along with defensive lineman Billy Ray Smith to the Steelers for a third-round pick in the 1958 draft.

==== Pittsburgh Steelers ====
Jimmy Orr as he appeared entering the 1959 season with the Pittsburgh Steelers.

Jimmy Orr would spend his first three seasons in Pittsburgh playing for the Pittsburgh Steelers. There was no doubt in the mind of head coach Buddy Parker that in Jimmy Orr his team was acquiring an offensive player, with the local press listing the newcomer variously as a "halfback," "flanker," and "end." His ability as a punter was also noted in training camp and Orr would quickly take on that role, kicking the ball 51 times for an average of 39.7 yards per punt in 1958. Orr wore number 86 in Pittsburgh, a number made famous decades later by Hines Ward and since removed from circulation in his honor.

Orr made the start in the season opener against the Cleveland Browns at split end. The Steelers, perennially one of the worst teams in the NFL in this era, were defeated by the Browns 45–12, with newcomer Jimmy Orr providing the best moment of the game for the home team. Spotted in the clear by Pittsburgh quarterback Earl Morrall, Orr hauled in a pass and sprinted towards a 77-yard touchdown — only to have the ball slip from his hands and bounce out of bounds on the 14 yard line. Pittsburgh managed to make use of Orr's fumble, scoring their only touchdown of the day four plays later.

Professional spurs were won in early November, when Orr caught a ball, only to be crushed between two onrushing Philadelphia Eagles defensive backs.

"I was scared when I saw him get hit," recalled teammate Bobby Layne. "He couldn't talk, his eyes were rolling around in his head, and his face was white. I thought he was hurt bad. You know what he said? The first thing he said was 'Did I hold the ball?' Then when they were taking him off the field, he turned around and said, 'I'll be right back.' He was, too — in one play that little critter was right back."

Orr's rookie campaign was a sensational one, with the speedy receiver catching 33 balls for 910 yards, and what prove to be a career best average of 27.6 yards per catch. His 910 yards gained in the air would stand as a Steelers rookie record until finally surpassed by JuJu Smith-Schuster in a 16-game season in 2017. Orr's three touchdowns and 205 yards in the season finale against the Chicago Cardinals were team records.

Pittsburgh would finish the year 7–4-1 in the Eastern Division, their first winning record since 1949, with the Steelers victorious in their last seven games in a row.

Both the Associated Press writers' poll and the United Press International coaches' poll named Orr the 1958 NFL Rookie of the Year.

Steeler head coach Buddy Parker was effusive, calling Orr "far and away the best rookie to play in our league last season."

"No other freshman in the league broke club records like Orr did and only two well-established receivers like Del Shofner of the Rams and Lenny Moore of the Colts gained more yards than he did throughout the season," Parker said. "I never saw a rookie pick up like Orr. He learned our system real fast and was a lot of help in the club going undefeated in its last seven games. Jimmy not only has good speed but he has a deceptive pace which makes him a hard fellow to cover. And if the ball is thrown anywhere near him he gets it and holds onto it."

Orr's final two years in Pittsburgh represented solid performances, albeit nothing as sensational as his rookie debut. The 1959 season began inauspiciously with a brief hospitalization resulting from a concussion suffered in training camp. This was shortly followed by a knee injury in a preseason game against the Chicago Bears when he was cheap-shot 40 yards away from the play by defensive back Jack McClairen, sending him to the hospital again for x-rays.

Orr caught 35 balls in 1959 — two more than his rookie year — but gained only about two-thirds as many yards with an average of 17.3 per catch and 5 touchdowns.

In 1960, numbers declined again, with Orr grabbing 59 balls for 541 yards (18.7 average) and 4 touchdowns. Although Orr started all but one of the 36 games played by the Steelers over the course of his tenure, the team began to wonder if perhaps the slightly built 25-year old had passed his athletic peak.

With the 1961 NFL season around the corner, Orr was traded in a five-player deal with the Baltimore Colts in July. The trade, in which the Colts sent veteran linemen Gene "Big Daddy" Lipscomb and Buzz Nutter to the Steelers, was touted by Colts head coach Weeb Ewback as part of a youth movement, with Baltimore also picking up two young and unproven linemen in the transaction, Joe Lewis and Dick Campbell.

Orr was ready to embark on the second part of his professional career, ten seasons in Baltimore.

==== Baltimore Colts ====
Jimmy Orr snags a game-winning touchdown pass against the Washington Redskins, Dec. 1962.

The 1961 season, Orr's first with the Colts, would be the least productive year of his NFL prime.

Orr gathered just 18 catches for 357 yards and 4 touchdowns for the year. Back of this lowered output were nagging leg muscle injuries that hobbled the "slight but swift pass-snaring specialist," affecting his practice time and limiting him to just 5 starts in the 13 games he played. Orr was gaining the reputation for being "injury prone."

Concerns among Colts fans about the trade of starting center Buzz Nutter and the popular defensive lineman "Big Daddy" Lipscomb would be soon forgotten, however, as in 1962 Orr followed his worst season with his best, shortly after Orr was presumed dead due to an accident in the United States Army National Guard that involved another individual, Edward Orr, sharing a last name and age with Orr.

Orr's breakout year in Colts blue was put into motion by head coach Weeb Ewbank, who in August moved offensive star Lenny Moore from flanker — a pass-catching position which evolved from right halfback — to left halfback, a running back position starting behind the quarterback. Jimmy Orr was moved from the split end position, which lined up directly on the left end of the line of scrimmage, to flanker, which started each play slightly behind the line of scrimmage on the right side. The ability to dodge defenders at the line and accelerate into pass routes on the same side of the field that quarterback Johnny Unitas rolled out had salutatory effect for the speedy-but-undersized Orr.

Orr was also blessed with good health in 1962, able to start all 14 games for the Colts in that season. The result was dramatic: Orr finished 1962 with career highs in receptions (55), yards gained (974), and touchdowns (11), numbers topping those of his stellar rookie year.

Falling just 26 yards short of the elusive 1,000 mark, Orr was nonplussed. "It's my own fault," he joked after the season-ending route of the Minnesota Vikings. "I dropped two passes. I can't remember when I have dropped even one before that I didn't have to make a diving or twisting try for it."

Surprisingly, Orr would not be tapped as an All-Pro in 1962.

The 1963 and 1964 Baltimore Colts seasons would be productive for Orr, who started 25 of a possible 28 games. Orr gained 708 yards receiving in injury-hamperd 1963 and 867 yards in 1964 — averaging a best-in-league 21.7 yards per catch in the latter season.

Orr would again win accolades in 1965 when he snared 10 touchdown passes and gained 847 yards on 45 catches. Following the season, Orr would be named a first team All-Pro by the Associated Press and would gain a spot in January to the 1966 Pro Bowl game.

Orr missed almost all of the 1967 Baltimore Colts season with injury, came back to catch 29 balls for 743 yards — a league-leading 25.6 yards per catch — in 1968, and was hurt again in 1969 and 1970, when he was relegated to a reserve role.

Orr was a participant in two Super Bowls during his career. In Super Bowl III, a memorable loss by the heavily favored Colts to the upstart New York Jets of the American Football League (AFL), Orr was involved in one play that subsequently gained legendary status.

On the last play of the first half, Colts quarterback Earl Morrall handed the ball to Tom Matte, who threw a lateral back to Morrall in a flea-flicker play. Orr, wide open at the 20-yard line with an easy path to the end zone, frantically waved for Morrall's attention, but Morrall did not see him and threw instead to fullback Jerry Hill, and the ball was intercepted.

Orr was also a member of the 1970 Colts team that won the AFC championship and did battle with the Dallas Cowboys of the National Football Conference (NFC) in Super Bowl V. Orr was in uniform but was not inserted into the game, limited to giving words of confidence to Colts kicker Jim O'Brien, who hit a last second 32-yard field goal to ice a 16–13 Baltimore win.

After the game, Jimmy Orr announced his retirement in conjunction with teammate Billy Ray Smith after 13 seasons in the National Football League:

"I'm retiring," Orr said. "Billy Ray and I started together with the Rams, then we were traded to the Steelers, and then he was traded to the Colts and he told them to trade for me, so he got me here. And now we're retiring together."

Orr retired a Super Bowl champion, having garnered 400 career receptions for 7,914 receiving yards (19.8 average) and 66 touchdowns.

=== Life after football ===
After retiring from football, Orr returned home to Georgia, where he operated a restaurant in Atlanta.

Orr was an avid golfer in his free time.

=== Death and legacy ===
Jimmy Orr died October 27, 2020, at Brunswick, Georgia. He was 85 years old at the time of his death.

Orr is remembered for numerous touchdown catches made in the back right corner of the end zone — known to the Memorial Stadium faithful as "Orr's Corner" or "Orrsville." "I must have caught 45 or 50 touchdowns in that right corner," Orr once recalled. "It was sloped some, a little downhill, which helped me, speed-wise. I wasn't all that fast."

== NFL career statistics ==
Legend
	Super Bowl champion
	Led the league
**Bold**	Career high

=== Regular season ===
Year	Team	Games		Receiving				
Year	Team	GP	GS	Rec	Yds	Avg	Lng	TD
1958	PIT	12	12	33	910	**27.6**	78	7
1959	PIT	12	11	35	604	17.3	43	5
1960	PIT	12	12	29	541	18.7	51	4
1961	BAL	13	5	18	357	19.8	64	4
1962	BAL	**14**	**14**	**55**	**974**	17.7	80	**11**
1963	BAL	12	11	41	708	17.3	60	5
1964	BAL	**14**	**14**	40	867	21.7	69	6
1965	BAL	**14**	**14**	45	847	18.8	57	10
1966	BAL	13	13	37	618	16.7	61	3
1967	BAL	5	1	3	72	24.0	55	1
1968	BAL	13	11	29	743	25.6	**84**	6
1969	BAL	7	7	25	474	19.0	47	2
1970	BAL	8	1	10	199	19.9	29	2
Career		149	126	400	7,914	19.8	84	66
