= Gene Lipscomb =

American football player (1931–1963)

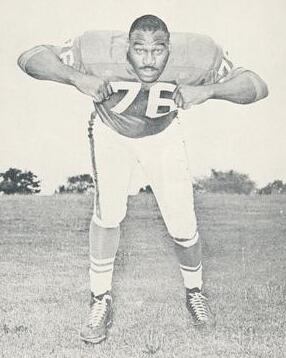
- Lipscomb c. 1961

No. 85, 78, 76
- Position: Defensive tackle

Personal information
- Born: August 9, 1931; Uniontown, Alabama, U.S.
- Died: May 10, 1963 (aged 31); Baltimore, Maryland, U.S.
- Listed height: 6 ft 6 in (1.98 m)
- Listed weight: 306 lb (139 kg)

Career information
- High school: Miller (Detroit, Michigan)
- College: None
- NFL draft: 1953: undrafted

Career history
- Los Angeles Rams (1953–1955); Baltimore Colts (1956–1960); Pittsburgh Steelers (1961–1962)

Awards and highlights
- 2× NFL champion (1958, 1959); 2× First-team All-Pro (1958, 1959); 2× Second-team All-Pro (1960, 1961); 3× Pro Bowl (1958, 1959, 1962); NFL sacks leader (1961) (unofficial); Pittsburgh Steelers Legends team; Michigan Sports Hall of Fame (2012)

Career NFL statistics
- Fumble recoveries: 7
- Interceptions: 1
- Sacks: 30.5
- Stats at Pro Football Reference

Eugene Allen Lipscomb (August 9, 1931 – May 10, 1963) was an American professional football defensive tackle and occasional professional wrestler who played ten seasons in the National Football League (NFL). He was known by the nickname "Big Daddy", due to his habit of calling everyone around him "Little Daddy".

Lipscomb was twice selected as a first-team All-Pro, twice chosen for the second All-Pro team, and twice NFL Champion as a member of the Baltimore Colts. Standing 6'6" tall and weighing around 300 pounds, Lipscomb is regarded as a prototype of the modern ultra-athletic interior defensive lineman.

== Early life ==
Eugene Allen Lipscomb was born in Uniontown, Alabama on August 9, 1931, to a family of cotton pickers. Lipscomb never knew his father, as he died in a federal Civilian Conservation Corps camp from illness. His mother moved with her only child, Gene, to Detroit, Michigan at age three.

When he was 11, his mother was stabbed 47 times by her boyfriend and left to die on the street. Lipscomb kept homicide photos with him throughout his life. After his mother's death, Lipscomb lived with his maternal grandparents, where he had to pay for his own clothes and room. He worked a variety of jobs as a youth while attending school, which included washing dishes, loading trucks, and working in a junkyard. "One year I ran a lift in a steel mill from midnight until seven in the morning. Then I changed clothes and went to school," Lipscomb told the Saturday Evening Post in 1960.

Lipscomb had a turbulent relationship with his grandfather who headed the household, the subject of verbal and physical abuse. His grandfather once stripped him and tied him to the bed to be whipped when he stole a bottle of whiskey. "My grandfather loved me, all right, and did the best that he knew how," Lipscomb later recalled. "But for some reason it was always hard for us to talk together. Instead of telling me what I was doing wrong and how to correct it, my grandfather would holler and whip me." Lipscomb was poorly educated and reportedly harbored a resentment to his better-schooled professional teammates. There is anecdotal evidence that he was never fully literate.

He played basketball and football at Sidney D. Miller High School but he was ruled ineligible in his senior year to being discovered playing semipro basketball by a rival coach. With a collegiate scholarship closed off due to his having accepted payment, Lipscomb's high school football coach, Will Robinson, recommended that he drop out of school and enlist in the Marine Corps — a course of action which Lipscomb followed.

Lipscomb was stationed at Camp Pendleton in San Clemente, California, where he played on the base's football team. His talent drew the eye of one Pete Rozelle, then an employee of the Los Angeles Rams in public relations. He gave a recommendation to head scout Eddie Kotal, who also liked what he saw.

== Professional career ==
=== Los Angeles Rams ===
Lipscomb was signed as an undrafted free agent by the Los Angeles Rams in 1953. After playing a few games at defensive end, he was moved to defensive tackle the following year. He was placed on waivers by the Rams in September 1956 and claimed by the Baltimore Colts.

It was not Lipscomb's physical gifts or on-field ability that caused the Rams to cut ties with Lipscomb, but rather the ubiquitous "off-field issues." Friendly opponent, Baltimore Colt halfback Buddy Young recalled, "Back in his Los Angeles days, Daddy was known for other things. I won't say he was irresponsible, but surely he wasn't the most disciplined and orderly soul wearing shoulder pads. Among other things, Daddy didn't read the clock very well during the season. Often he'd stay up long past the hour the coach had fixed as the club's bed time, and he drank some then, too. Caught up in a fast crowd, ignored by many of his Ram teammates, an orphan from a dirt-poor Detroit family, without any college experience, Daddy didn't seem to care much."

=== Baltimore Colts ===
The Colts were fortunate to land Lipscomb via the "waiver wire" for the standard $100 (equivalent to $1,184 in 2025) fee. The San Francisco 49ers were actually the team with the worst win-loss record from the previous season and thus had highest priority in placing waivers claims — and they wanted Lipscomb. Lipscomb was released over the Labor Day weekend, however, and the telegram claiming the big defensive tackle was not delivered until two days later. The Colts, meanwhile, had used the telephone to contact the league office to make their waiver claim and were awarded Lipscomb due to the tardiness of the 49ers' response.

In 1957, he led the team in tackles with 137. In 1958 and 1959, he was named to the Pro Bowl and was instrumental in the Colts' two consecutive NFL championships. He made up a defensive line that included two future Hall of Famers in Gino Marchetti and Art Donovan to go with Don Joyce and Ordell Braase.

Lipscomb was also extremely nimble for his size, reckoned by opponent Buddy Young as "by far the fastest" of the big men of his era. Lipscomb was able to play sideline to sideline, frequently forcing blockers to clutch and grab in an effort to halt him. When asked about such dubious interior line plays he stated, "If a player starts holding, I smack my hand flat against the earhole of his helmet. When he complains about dirty playing, I tell him to stop holding and I'll stop slapping. That's what I call working out a problem."

=== Pittsburgh Steelers ===
In July 1961, Lipscomb was traded to the Pittsburgh Steelers with center Buzz Nutter for receiver Jimmy Orr, defensive tackle Joe Lewis, and linebacker Dick Campbell. As part of the Steelers he was encouraged to play more up the field as an interior pass rusher to wreak havoc on guards. The result was a first season that saw a total of 17.5 sacks (according to retroactive counting of statistics).

Lipscomb was regarded as a prototype of the modern interior defensive lineman, combining great size with speed and agility. He was described by teammate Dick Hoak as "the first really big guy, at least that I ever saw, who was really fast and quick.... He was the first to go sideline to sideline. Other big guys couldn't do that."

Lipscomb's final NFL game was the Pro Bowl in January 1963, in which he was voted lineman of the game.

== Professional wrestling career ==
During the 1959–60 and 1960–61 off-seasons, Lipscomb earned extra income as a professional wrestler. He primarily wrestled in California for promotions such as the North American Wrestling Alliance, NWA San Francisco, and Ad Santel Promotions, going by either "Gene Lipscomb" or "Big Daddy Lipscomb". In spring 1960, he made a foray to the northeastern United States and Montreal, Quebec, Canada to wrestle for Eddie Quinn. In June 1960, he appeared with 50th State Big Time Wrestling in Hawaii. In April 1961, he appeared with the American Wrestling Association in Milwaukee, Wisconsin.

== Personal life ==
Lipscomb had a taste for both women and alcohol, which resulted in three marriages and divorces — including one case of bigamy when he married his second wife in Tijuana, Mexico, while he was still married to his first.

He was known as a "gentle giant" who on more than one occasion would arrange to provide shoes to underprivileged children he met on the street.

=== Death and legacy ===
On May 10, 1963, Lipscomb went out on the streets of Baltimore, Maryland. According to his companion of that night in Tim Black, they partied with women until 3am before trying heroin. Black stated that Lipscomb had been using it multiple times a week for the previous six months, with Black being his dealer. When Lipscomb tried the heroin, he began drooling according to Black, and it was only after failing to awaken him that he took him to a hospital. The autopsy revealed that Libscomb died of an overdose of heroin with fresh needle marks along with a fatty liver. He was pronounced dead just before 8am at Lutheran Hospital. He was only 31 years old when he died, cutting short what would have been a Hall of Fame career.

Friends of Lipscomb disbelieved the story due to his professed fear of needles, with some believing that he was the victim of a homicide for robbery. Teammate and good friend Johnny Sample said he had never known Lipscomb to touch narcotics, and that Lipscomb had told him the day of his death that he had just cashed an unexpected check for $750 and was "going to have a little fun". Sample speculated that Lipscomb had been flashing cash around and buying drinks for people, met strangers who later took advantage of him being drunk, injected him with heroin, and robbed him. Sample noted that the injection marks were in Lipscomb's right arm, and that Lipscomb was right-handed, making it unlikely that the narcotics were self-injected, adding further doubt to Black's story.

Before his body was moved for burial, thousands went to his viewing in Baltimore, reportedly stretching multiple city blocks even when it was set to close at 10pm. His funeral was held in Detroit to a crowd of over a thousand people composed of teammates and loved ones. He was buried at Lincoln Park Memorial Cemetery.

The Professional Football Researchers Association named Lipscomb to the PFRA Hall of Very Good Class of 2006. Lipscomb was inducted into the Michigan Sports Hall of Fame in 2012. In 2019, Lipscomb was selected as a finalist for the NFL's 100th Anniversary Team. Lipscomb was a senior nominee for the Class of 2025 of the Pro Football Hall of Fame.

== See also ==
- List of gridiron football players who became professional wrestlers
- List of gridiron football players who died during their careers

== Sources ==
- Sample, Johnny. Confessions of a Dirty Ballplayer, New York: Dell Publishing, 1970, ASIN :B000HZ60DY.
