= 1960 All-Pro Team =

Official list of the best NFL players in 1960

Selectors of All-Pros for the 1960 National Football League season included the Associated Press (AP), United Press International (UPI), New York Daily News (NYDN), Newspaper Enterprise Association (NEA), and The Sporting News (SN).

== Offensive selections ==
=== Quarterbacks ===
- Norm Van Brocklin, Philadelphia Eagles (AP, NEA, UPI)
- Milt Plum, Cleveland Browns (AP-2)
- Johnny Unitas, Baltimore Colts (NEA-2)

=== Halfbacks ===
- Paul Hornung, Green Bay Packers (AP, NEA, UPI)
- Lenny Moore, Baltimore Colts (AP, NEA, UPI)
- John David Crow, St. Louis Cardinals (NEA, AP-2)
- Tom Tracy, Pittsburgh Steelers (AP-2, NEA-2)
- Bobby Mitchell, Cleveland Browns (NEA-2)

=== Fullbacks ===
- Jim Brown, Cleveland Browns (AP, NEA, UPI)
- Jim Taylor, Green Bay Packers (AP-2, NEA-2)

=== Ends ===
- Raymond Berry, Baltimore Colts (AP, NEA, UPI)
- Sonny Randle, St. Louis Cardinals (AP, UPI, NEA-2)
- Tommy McDonald, Philadelphia Eagles (NEA)
- Jim Phillips, Los Angeles Rams (AP-2)
- R. C. Owens, San Francisco 49ers (AP-2)
- Kyle Rote, New York Giants (NEA-2)

=== Tackles ===
- Jim Parker, Baltimore Colts (AP, NEA, UPI)
- Forrest Gregg, Green Bay Packers (AP)
- Rosey Brown, New York Giants (UPI, AP-2, NEA-2)
- Bob St. Clair, San Francisco 49ers (NEA, AP-2)

=== Guards ===
- Jim Ray Smith, Cleveland Browns (AP, NEA, UPI)
- Jerry Kramer, Green Bay Packers (AP)
- Stan Jones, Chicago Bears (UPI, AP-2)
- Jack Stroud, New York Giants (NEA, AP-2)
- Art Spinney, Baltimore Colts (NEA-2)
- Bruce Bosley, San Francisco 49ers (NEA-2)

=== Centers ===
- Jim Ringo, Green Bay Packers (AP, NEA, UPI)
- Art Hunter, Los Angeles Rams (AP-2, NEA-2)

== Defensive selections ==
=== Defensive ends ===
- Gino Marchetti, Baltimore Colts (AP, NEA, UPI)
- Andy Robustelli, New York Giants (AP, NEA-2)
- Doug Atkins, Chicago Bears (NEA, UPI, AP-2)
- Charlie Krueger, San Francisco 49ers (AP-2)
- John Paluck, Washington Redskins (NEA-2)

=== Defensive tackles ===
- Henry Jordan, Green Bay Packers (AP, UPI, NEA-2)
- Alex Karras, Detroit Lions (AP, UPI)
- Gene Lipscomb, Baltimore Colts (NEA)
- Bob Toneff, Washington Redskins (NEA)
- Leo Nomellini, San Francisco 49ers (AP-2)
- Art Donovan, Baltimore Colts (AP-2)
- Ernie Stautner, Pittsburgh Steelers (NEA-2)

=== Linebackers ===
- Chuck Bednarik, Philadelphia Eagles (AP, UPI)
- Bill George, Chicago Bears (AP, NEA, UPI)
- Bill Forester, Green Bay Packers (AP, UPI, NEA-2)
- Sam Huff, New York Giants (NEA, AP-2)
- Joe Schmidt, Detroit Lions (NEA, AP-2)
- Les Richter, Los Angeles Rams (AP-2)
- John Reger, Pittsburgh Steelers (NEA-2)
- Bill Pellington, Baltimore Colts (NEA-2)

=== Defensive backs ===
- Tom Brookshier, Philadelphia Eagles (AP, NEA, UPI)
- Abe Woodson, San Francisco 49ers (AP, NEA-2)
- Jerry Norton, St. Louis Cardinals (AP, NEA, UPI)
- Jimmy Patton, New York Giants (AP, NEA, UPI)
- Night Train Lane, Detroit Lions (NEA, UPI)
- Ed Meador, Los Angeles Rams (AP-2)
- Jesse Whittenton, Green Bay Packers (AP-2)
- Dave Baker, San Francisco 49ers (AP-2, NEA-2)
- Don Burroughs, Philadelphia Eagles (AP-2, NEA-2)
- Yale Lary, Detroit Lions (NEA-2)
