= Flea flicker =

Trick play in American football

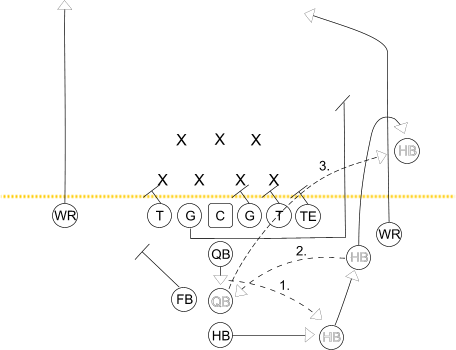
A play diagram depicting a version of a flea flicker type play from an I-formation, fullback offset weakside

In American football, the flea flicker is an unorthodox or "trick play" designed to fool the defensive team into thinking that a play is a run instead of a pass. It can be considered an extreme variant of the play-action pass and an extension of the halfback option play.

== Description ==
After the snap, the quarterback hands off or laterals the ball to a running back or another player on the team, who then runs towards or parallel to the line of scrimmage. Before the running back crosses the line of scrimmage, he throws a backwards pass to the quarterback, who looks to pass to an eligible receiver.

A typical football defense is very aggressive to the run, and the flea flicker uses that against them. The play is designed to draw the defense into defending against a run and away from defending a pass, leaving the quarterback free from any immediate pass rush, and leaving receivers potentially open to catch a pass as their covering defenders may have moved off the pass looking to tackle a ball carrier. The elaborate back-and-forth with the ball also gives time for receivers to get downfield, opening up an opportunity for a long completion.

Like most other types of trick plays, the play is very risky. Despite the potential for a very big play when running a flea flicker, the play takes a long time to develop, meaning it often ends in disaster when run against a strong pass rush.

== Origins ==
Illinois coach Bob Zuppke is credited with the play's invention: the flea flicker made its debut in Illinois' 1925 game against Penn as a fake field goal with Earl Britton, Red Grange, and Chuck Kassel.

On the play, Britton lined up as a kicker, with Grange as holder. After the snap, Britton threw the ball to Kassel, who then lateraled to Grange; Grange proceeded to score a touchdown on a 20-yard run.

== Notable examples ==
- January 12, 1969: In Super Bowl III, with the Baltimore Colts trailing the New York Jets 7-0 just before halftime, the Colts attempted a flea flicker. Despite the fact that Jimmy Orr was wide open near the end zone, Earl Morrall threw the ball to fullback Jerry Hill, only for Jets safety Jim Hudson to intercept the pass. During a regular-season game against the Atlanta Falcons, Morrall used the same play and was able to find Orr for a touchdown.
- January 30, 1983: In the final quarter of Super Bowl XVII, the Washington Redskins were trailing the Miami Dolphins 17-13 when they attempted a flea flicker, which they had successfully used in the Divisional Round against the Minnesota Vikings. Mindful of the ruse, Miami defensive back Lyle Blackwood intercepted the pass; however, Washington coach Joe Gibbs later pointed out the play was not a total loss, as Blackwood was downed on his own 1-yard line. Washington ended up forcing Miami to punt from deep in their own territory and got the ball back on their 48-yard line, setting up a touchdown drive.
- November 18, 1985: On a nationally televised Monday Night Football game between the Washington Redskins and the New York Giants, the score was tied 7–7 in the second quarter when the Redskins attempted a flea flicker. The play failed to trick the Giants' defense, which had the blitz on, and longtime Redskins quarterback Joe Theismann infamously suffered a career-ending injury after being sacked by Giants linebacker Lawrence Taylor: as Taylor tackled Theismann to make the sack, his entire weight came crashing down on Theismann's right leg, breaking it in two places.
- January 25, 1987: In Super Bowl XXI, the New York Giants successfully ran a flea flicker play against the Denver Broncos: quarterback Phil Simms passed the ball to receiver Phil McConkey, who ran all the way to the Broncos' 1-yard line before being tackled for a 44-yard gain. The Giants scored a touchdown on the next play.
- November 9, 1994: In the television show Beverly Hills, 90210, Season 05, Episode 10, "The Dreams of Dylan McKay," Steve Sanders uses the flea flicker play, which he learned from his father, to win an intramural college flag football tournament.
- January 3, 2009: In the NFC Wild Card Round, Kurt Warner successfully completed a flea flicker against the Atlanta Falcons with running back Edgerrin James and wide receiver Larry Fitzgerald. Warner and the Arizona Cardinals were finding early success running the ball in the first quarter of the game, so Warner handed the ball off to James, who ran about two yards towards the line of scrimmage and then turned and pitched the football back five yards to Warner. The pitch was almost unseen as the safeties and linebackers had their views blocked by the defensive line, which was collapsing on the running play. The play ended with a 50-yard pass (42 yards officially, measured from the original line of scrimmage) to Fitzgerald, who jumped backwards in the air while in double-coverage to make the catch in the front left corner of the endzone for the touchdown, which helped the Cardinals to take an early 7–0 lead, and ultimately win their first playoff game in ten years (it was also their first home playoff game in 61 years, the last having been played when they were based in Chicago).
- January 18, 2009: In the NFC Championship Game, Kurt Warner successfully completed a flea flicker play against the Philadelphia Eagles with running back J.J. Arrington and wide receiver Larry Fitzgerald. Warner passed to Arrington, who lateraled back to him before Warner completed a 62-yard pass to Fitzgerald to score a touchdown, which helped the Cardinals to increase their lead to 14–3 and win 32–25.
- December 4, 2011: In the first game after acquiring quarterback Kyle Orton off waivers, Kansas City Chiefs starter Tyler Palko was benched due to ineffectiveness in the beginning of the second quarter in favor of Orton. The first play run for Orton was a designed flea flicker, but strong safety Major Wright of the Chicago Bears struck Orton as he threw, causing the pass to fall incomplete and also injuring Orton's finger, causing him to miss the remainder of the game. The Chiefs ended up winning 10–3.
- January 22, 2017: The New England Patriots ran a flea flicker 7:07 into the 2nd quarter of the AFC Championship game against the Pittsburgh Steelers. Tom Brady handed the ball to running back Dion Lewis on what appeared to be a basic run on first-and-10, but as Lewis approached the line of scrimmage, he stopped and pitched the ball back to Brady, who scanned the field and found a wide-open Chris Hogan for a 34-yard pass to score a touchdown and give the Patriots a 17–6 lead. The Patriots won the game 36–17 en route to their fifth Super Bowl Championship.
- January 21, 2018: The two Conference Championship games included three successful flea flickers:
  - First, in the American Football Conference Championship Game, Jacksonville Jaguars quarterback Blake Bortles handed off to T.J. Yeldon, who tossed the ball back to Bortles. Bortles then passed to Allen Hurns for a 20-yard gain against the New England Patriots.
  - Later in the fourth quarter, the Patriots scored with a flea flicker pass from Tom Brady to Phillip Dorsett for 31 yards.
  - Finally, in the National Football Conference Championship Game, with the Philadelphia Eagles leading the Minnesota Vikings by 24–7, Eagles RB Corey Clement flicked the ball back to QB Nick Foles, who completed a 41-yard touchdown pass to WR Torrey Smith.

== Variations ==
=== Reverse flea flicker ===
The rise of the spread offense in recent years has led to the rise of the reverse flea flicker (also known as the double reverse flea flicker), which is an extension of both the conventional flea flicker and a reverse play. The play starts with the quarterback handing the ball off to another player, usually a running back, who then laterals the ball to a receiver. The receiver then laterals the ball again back to the quarterback, who looks to throw.

=== Throwback flea flicker ===
Also known as a throwback double pass, a throwback flea flicker draws the defense to the outside rather than to the inside. The play typically begins with the quarterback pitching the ball to a running back, who runs outside as if the play were a sweep. However, as the ball carrier draws the defense to the outside, he turns and throws a backward pass to the quarterback, who then throws downfield.
