= Dick Hoak =

American football player and coach (1939–2026)

- Hoak in 1963

No. 42
- Position: Running back

Personal information
- Born: December 8, 1939; Jeannette, Pennsylvania, U.S.
- Died: November 9, 2026 (aged 86)
- Listed height: 5 ft 11 in (1.80 m)
- Listed weight: 195 lb (88 kg)

Career information
- High school: Jeannette
- College: Penn State
- NFL draft: 1961: 7th round, 90th overall pick

Career history

Playing
- Pittsburgh Steelers (1961–1970)

Coaching
- Pittsburgh Steelers (1972–1991) Offensive backfield coach; Pittsburgh Steelers (1991–2006) Running backs coach

Awards and highlights
- 5× Super Bowl champion (IX, X, XIII, XIV, XL); Pro Bowl (1968); Pittsburgh Steelers Legends team; Pittsburgh Steelers Hall of Honor

Career NFL statistics
- Rushing yards: 3,965
- Rushing average: 3.5
- Receptions: 146
- Receiving yards: 1,452
- Total touchdowns: 33
- Stats at Pro Football Reference

Richard John Hoak (December 8, 1939 – November 9, 2026) was an American professional football player and coach for the Pittsburgh Steelers of the National Football League (NFL). He played for the Steelers as a running back. Hoak played college football for the Penn State Nittany Lions and was selected by the Steelers in the seventh round of the 1961 NFL draft. He played for the Steelers from 1961 to 1970, and then became the longest tenured coach in the team's history, serving as the team's running backs coach from 1972 to 2007.

== Early life ==
Hoak was born in Jeannette, Pennsylvania, on December 8, 1939. He was a star quarterback and defensive back at Jeannette High School, leading his team to the Western Pennsylvania Interscholastic Athletic League (WPIAL) 3A title in 1956. Hoak was named All-State and All-WPIAL.

Hoak also played three years on Jeannette's basketball team, leading the team in scoring as a senior and setting a single-game scoring record (39 points). He was named All-WPIAL and the All-Section basketball team. Hoak also earned three letters in track. He graduated in 1957.

== College career ==
Hoak attended Penn State University, where he played varsity football for the Nittany Lions from 1958 to 1961. As a sophomore he played halfback and safety, and continued as a running back as a junior. He was playing quarterback, as well as safety, by his senior year. As a junior in 1959, Penn State won the first Liberty Bowl (7–0 over Alabama). Penn State again won the 1960 Liberty Bowl, 41–12 over Oregon. Hoak was named the game's Most Valuable Player (MVP) passing for two touchdowns, running for two touchdowns, and intercepting two passes.

As a senior in 1960, he was voted the Nittany Lion's MVP by his teammates and by the Penn State Quarterback Club. Over his three-year career he gained 767 rushing yards and 251 receiving yards, scored eight touchdowns, and had a 55.8% pass completion rate. He graduated in 1961 with a bachelor's degree in social studies.

== Professional career ==
Chosen by the Steelers in the seventh round of the 1961 NFL draft (90th overall), Hoak had an impressive career, amassing 3,965 rushing yards in 1132 attempts (3.5 avg) with 25 touchdowns. He also caught 146 passes for 1,452 yards (9.9 avg) and 8 touchdowns. He was named to one Pro Bowl (1968), when he rushed for a career-high 858 yards and rattled off a 77-yard run, the longest in the NFL that season. Overall he led the team in rushing three times (1965, 1968 and 1969). He retired after the 1970 season as Pittsburgh's No. 2 all-time rusher (through the 2025 season, he now ranks eighth).

== Coaching career ==
After a highly successful playing career, Hoak was coaching high school football when he was hired by then-coach Chuck Noll as the Steelers' offensive backfield coach in 1972, and served in that position for 35 seasons. He passed on the head coaching job with the USFL's Pittsburgh Maulers in 1983 because it would have been disloyal to the Rooneys (the Steelers ownership family). Noll retired in 1991, and Hoak was the only one of Noll's assistants retained under his successor, Bill Cowher, becoming the running backs coach. On January 1, 2007, Hoak announced his retirement after 45 seasons with the team: 10 as a player and 35 as a coach.

During Hoak's tenure with Cowher, the Steelers rushed for over 30,000 yards (the only team to do so in this time period) and led the league in rushing yards three times. He was the position coach for Hall-of-Famers Franco Harris and Jerome Bettis, who rank first and second all-time Steeler leading rushers. Over his 35 years as a Steelers' coach, the team won five Super Bowls and 13 AFC Championships.

== Personal life and death ==
Hoak lived in Hempfield Township, Pennsylvania. Hoak's wife, Lynn, died on March 9, 2019.

Hoak died on November 11, 2026, at the age of 86. Upon his death, Steelers president Art Rooney II issued a statement saying: "Dick represented everything the Steelers stand for with his toughness, loyalty, dedication and an unwavering commitment to the team. First as a player, then as a coach, Dick's contributions to this organization spanned generations."

== Honors ==
The Pro Football Hall of Fame honored Hoak in late June 2025 as an assistant coach, with its 2025 Award of Excellence. In 2024, he was inducted into the National High School Football Hall of Fame. In 2018, he was inducted into the Jeannette City School District Hall of Fame. In 2017, Hoak was inducted as an inaugural member of the Steelers Hall of Honor. Other honors include the Western Pennsylvania Interscholastic Athletic League (WPIAL) Hall of Fame, the Pennsylvania Sports Hall of Fame, National Italian American Sports Hall of Fame Pittsburgh Chapter, and Pittsburgh’s Dapper Dan Man of the Year.

== NFL career statistics ==
Legend
	Led the league
**Bold**	Career high

Year	Team	Games		Rushing					Receiving				
Year	Team	GP	GS	Att	Yds	Avg	Lng	TD	Rec	Yds	Avg	Lng	TD
1961	PIT	14	7	85	302	3.6	22	0	3	18	6.0	7	0
1962	PIT	14	6	117	442	3.8	39	4	9	133	**14.8**	23	0
1963	PIT	12	12	**216**	679	3.1	17	**6**	11	118	10.7	23	1
1964	PIT	14	7	84	258	3.1	17	2	12	137	11.4	22	**3**
1965	PIT	14	11	131	426	3.3	42	5	19	228	12.0	**48**	1
1966	PIT	13	10	81	212	2.6	16	1	23	239	10.4	31	0
1967	PIT	14	2	52	142	2.7	11	1	17	111	6.5	20	1
1968	PIT	14	13	175	**858**	**4.9**	**77**	3	**28**	**253**	9.0	30	1
1969	PIT	14	13	151	531	3.5	13	2	20	190	9.5	26	1
1970	PIT	12	0	40	115	2.9	13	1	4	25	6.3	18	0
Career		135	81	1,132	3,965	3.5	77	25	146	1,452	9.9	48	8
