= Dick Campbell (American football) =

American football player (born 1935)

No. 66
- Position: Linebacker

Personal information
- Born: July 17, 1935 (age 91); Green Bay, Wisconsin, U.S.
- Listed height: 6 ft 1 in (1.85 m)
- Listed weight: 227 lb (103 kg)

Career information
- High school: Green Bay West
- College: Marquette
- NFL draft: 1958: 10th round, 116th overall pick

Career history
- Pittsburgh Steelers (1958–1960)

Career NFL statistics
- Games played: 36
- Interceptions: 3
- Stats at Pro Football Reference

Raymond Richard Campbell (born July 17, 1935) is an American former professional football player who was a linebacker in the National Football League (NFL). He played college football for the Marquette Golden Warriors and was selected by the Pittsburgh Steelers in the tenth round of the 1958 NFL draft and played three seasons with the team.

Campbell was part of a big five-player July 1961 trade with the Baltimore Colts sending wide receiver Jimmy Orr to the Colts and bringing veteran linemen Gene "Big Daddy" Lipscomb and Buzz Nutter to the Steelers. However, he failed to make the Colts roster in 1961.
