= Len Burnett =

American football player (born 1939)

No. 86
- Position: Defensive back

Personal information
- Born: August 29, 1939 (age 87); San Diego, California, U.S.
- Listed height: 6 ft 1 in (1.85 m)
- Listed weight: 195 lb (88 kg)

Career information
- High school: Lincoln (San Diego)
- College: Oregon

Career history
- Pittsburgh Steelers (1961)

Career statistics
- Games played: 4
- Stats at Pro Football Reference

Leonard Everett Burnett (born August 29, 1939) is an American former professional football player who was a defensive back for the Pittsburgh Steelers of the National Football League (NFL). He played college football for the Oregon Ducks.
