= Tom Tracy =

American football player (1934–1996)

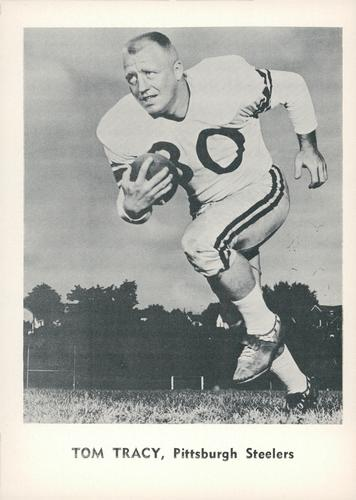

No. 86, 30, 36
- Position: Running back

Personal information
- Born: September 7, 1934; Birmingham, Michigan, U.S.
- Died: January 24, 1996 (aged 61); Madison Heights, Michigan, U.S.
- Listed height: 5 ft 9 in (1.75 m)
- Listed weight: 205 lb (93 kg)

Career information
- College: Tennessee (1951–1954)
- NFL draft: 1956: 5th round, 50th overall pick

Career history
- Ottawa Rough Riders (1955–1956); Detroit Lions (1956–1957); Pittsburgh Steelers (1958–1963); Washington Redskins (1963–1964)

Awards and highlights
- NFL champion (1957); Second-team All-Pro (1960); 2× Pro Bowl (1958, 1960); CFL All Star (1955); First-team All-SEC (1954)

Career NFL statistics
- Rushing yards: 2,912
- Rushing average: 3.6
- Receptions: 113
- Receiving yards: 1,468
- Total touchdowns: 31
- Stats at Pro Football Reference

John Thomas "Tom The Bomb" Tracy (September 7, 1934 – January 24, 1996) was an American professional football halfback-fullback in the National Football League (NFL) for the Detroit Lions, Pittsburgh Steelers and Washington Redskins as well as the Canadian Football League (CFL) with the Ottawa Rough Riders. He was a fifth-round draft pick (50th overall) by the Detroit Lions in the 1956 NFL draft.

Tracy played college football for the Tennessee Volunteers before he embarked on a professional football career in Canada, where he spent one full season and part of another with the Ottawa Rough Riders. He earned All-Star recognition in his rookie year. After nearly two seasons with the Lions, he went on to play in a pair of Pro Bowls as the Steelers primary back. He was voted as a first team All-Conference All-Pro by the Sporting News in the 1960 season.

Consistently listed at 5-foot-9 or 5-foot-10 and 205 pounds, Tracy was undersized for his position, especially at the pro level. He went by the nickname of Tom The Bomb because of his squatty body, deceptive quickness and well-timed cuts that allowed him to explode into the open field. Despite his modest size, he was a willing and able blocker.

In his prime, Tracy and the more publicized New York Giants halfback Frank Gifford shared the title of most lethal triple threat in pro football. Over a three-year span (1958–60), he amassed 4,096 yards on 639 run plays and pass receptions. Only Cleveland Browns fullback Jim Brown amassed more yardage in that time frame, and his came almost exclusively on the ground. What set Tracy apart from the rest was an ability to make big plays on the option pass. He completed 18 passes for 751 yards, a staggering 41.7 yards per completion and a half-dozen of them for touchdowns.

In an NFL career that spanned eight seasons, Tracy carried the ball 808 times from scrimmage for 2,912 yards and 17 touchdowns, caught 113 passes for 1,468 yards and 14 TDs and passed for 854 yards and 12 TDs. He also kicked three field goals and four extra points.

== Early life ==
Tracy attended Birmingham High School, a northern Detroit suburb, where he starred at halfback for the Maples football team. Few if any athletes had been more potent in Oakland County prep circles. The crew-cut blond could go off for a long gain at any time, it seemed, which prompted fans to call him The Bomb before long.

By his junior year, Tracy had the attention of numerous colleges around the country. He chose the University of Tennessee from upward of 50 offers.

== College career ==
At Tennessee, Tracy showed promise under coach Harvey Robinson in his 1953 debut. The sophomore rushed for 336 yards (4.7 per carry) and five touchdowns in a back-up role.

Tracy came into his own in the 1954 season, when he carried the Volunteers offense as one of the most potent play-makers in the nation. The junior paced the team in attempts (116), yards (794), yards per attempt (6.7) and touchdowns (five) on the ground.

Yet no sooner did Robinson leave after the season than Tracy followed him a short time later. New coach Bowden Wyatt planned to build his Single Wing offense around highly regarded junior Johnny Majors, a former Tennessee prep star whose family had deep football roots. In an attempt to toughen up his squad, the coach called on Tracy to run a wedge play against a 15-man defense in practice on day. The senior halfback was injured in the drill, but rather than halt the session while he struggled to get off the field, Wyatt immediately called on the next man to take his place. Tracy felt unappreciated if not betrayed, so much so that he quit the team the following day without resistance from his coach.

== Professional career ==
=== Ottawa Rough Riders ===
Tracy wasn't out of football for long. Only months earlier, his former line coach Chan Caldwell had left Tennessee to become head man of the Rough Riders in the Canadian Football League. He brought Volunteers freshman coach John Idzik with him to serve as backfield coach. While the two coaches clashed over personnel and play-calling matters, Tracy didn't disappoint as the bell cow back of the Split-T attack. The Big Four All-Star selection finished the season as the team leader in rushing yards (729), attempts (102) and average per carry (7.1). In addition, he returned eight kickoffs for 169 yards (21.1 average) and booted four field goals and 23 extra points.

=== Detroit Lions ===
All the while, the hometown Lions had eyes for Tracy south of the border. On Jan. 17, they selected him in the fifth round (50th overall) of the 1956 NFL draft. Still under contract with the Rough Riders, Tracy remained with the team long enough to play three more games before his release was finalized.

On Oct. 21, three days after his contract became official, Tracy made his first appearance in a Lions uniform. In a come-from-behind 20–17 victory over the San Francisco 49ers in Detroit. he rushed for 26 yards on nine tries and picked up five more yards on a pair of pass receptions.

Yet because the Lions were a deep, experienced team in a tight Western Division race, opportunities for the rookie became scarce thereafter. He touched the ball only four more times the rest of the season. The campaign wasn't without its positives, however, as the 22-year-old Tracy gained valuable experience with a championship contender. Moreover, veteran quarterback and unquestioned team leader Bobby Layne took the young Lion under his wing, which meant frequent late-night forays with several teammates who were known to party as hard off the field as they played on it.

After their second-place finish of the previous season, the Lions had their championship hopes furthered dampened by the abrupt resignation of coach Buddy Parker only days before the 1957 regular-season opener. Under new head man George Wilson, Tracy earned a back-up role behind fullback John Henry Johnson and halfback Gene Gedman in training camp. The team struggled the split its first six games in the regular season, during which he touched the ball a mere 16 times.

Finally, in Week 7, Wilson turned to Tracy for a spark. The second-year back managed only 11 yards in six carries in a 27–16 victory over the Eagles in Philadelphia, however, which did little to discourage the notion that he was too small to be a fullback and too slow to be a halfback. While the Lions closed with five wins in their final six games of the regular season to claim a piece of the Western Division crown, a growing number of local fans and media began to question his place on the roster. In that span, he saw action in one game and then only in a mop-up role.

== 'My Most Memorable Day' ==
In 61 scant seconds, Tracy saw his fortunes change considerably on a balmy afternoon in San Francisco, where the Lions and 49ers met in a one-game playoff on Dec. 22 to decide the division title. "That day I'll never forget," Tracy told the Pontiac (now Oakland) Press years later. "It will always be my most memorable day in pro football."

While Johnson nursed a leg injury on the bench, the Lions faced what appeared to be an insurmountable 27–7 deficit early in the third quarter. Thrust into a lead role after nearly two months of inactivity, Tom The Bomb lived up to his nickname with 1- and 57-yard touchdown runs on consecutive possessions to pull his team within six points. Shortly after Tracy picked up 9 yards to the 5-yard line, Gedman scored from two yards out to open the fourth quarter for a 28–27 lead. The visitors held on for a stunning 31–27 victory, and Tracy's name was firmly etched in Lions folklore. In all, he gained 86 yards on 11 carries and seven more on one pass completion.

Tracy received a hero's welcome upon his return to Detroit, but when Johnson was deemed fit to practice in advance of the NFL Championship Game, it was business as normal one week later. He didn't carry the ball from scrimmage and caught one pass for 16 yards in a 59–14 rout of the Cleveland Browns even though the outcome was never in doubt after halftime.

=== Pittsburgh Steelers ===
In the 1958 preseason, Wilson began to put his stamp on the roster in earnest. In addition to Gedman and Johnson, the veteran holdovers, rookies Dan Lewis and Ken Webb joined the mix in a crowded backfield. Only nine months after his memorable performance in the Western Division playoff game, Tracy was expendable, and on Sept. 9, he was traded to the Steelers in return for an undisclosed draft pick. There he was reunited with Layne and Buddy Parker, his former Lions teammates.

Parker was more concerned about what Tracy could do on a football field than what critics wished he could be. That is, provide the stagnant Steelers offense with a jolt of some much-needed explosiveness and versatility. The coach immediately announced that Tracy would play the halfback position, where his sure hands could become more involved in the pass game. Even though the newcomer didn't arrive until late in the preseason, Parker was confident enough to elevate him to a starter role as soon as he had grasp of the system.

Assistant coach Harry Gilmer saw something else in Tracy that would take his career to another level. A former University of Alabama star tailback-quarterback, Gilmer believed Tracy had the accuracy and arm strength to be effective on the option pass, which was added to the playbook. In a 45–12 loss to the Cleveland Browns in Week 2, Tracy threw an incompletion on the first pass of his NFL career. In the return engagement two weeks later, he surprised the Browns defense on a 64-yard hook-up with flanker Ray Mathews for a touchdown in the first quarter. The Steelers lost the game, 27–10, but they found what would become a potent weapon for their offense.

By Week 6, Tracy and Layne were more than roommates and drinking buddies. They were the linchpins of one of the most feared offenses in the league. After a 1–4 start to the regular season, the Steelers closed with five wins and one loss to finish with a 7-4-1 mark and third-place finish. Tracy gained at least 100 total yards from scrimmage in each of the final five games. The group reached their peak in the season finale, a 38-21 romp over the Chicago Cardinals in Pittsburgh, when they rolled up an NFL record 683 yards, including 472 through the air.

For that and the next two seasons, Tracy laid claim to the title of most lethal triple threat in pro football.

== Big Night in Big D ==
In 1960, league executives saw fit to pair the Steelers against the expansion Dallas Cowboys at the Cotton Bowl in their NFL debut. The game also marked the much-anticipated homecoming of Layne, a former Texas Longhorns college star. The Cowboys stunned the visitors with a pair of touchdowns in the first five minutes to take a 14–0 advantage. They held a 21–14 lead at halftime before Tracy and Layne seized control of the game.

In the third quarter, Tracy hit flanker Buddy Dial in stride on a 70-yard pass. Layne added the extra point to tie the score at 21-all. After the teams traded touchdowns and conversions, Layne and Tracy hooked up on a 65-yard TD pass with 2:51 left in the fourth quarter, which proved to be the game-winner in a dramatic 35–28 victory.

Tracy finished the contest with 216 total yards and two touchdowns—64 yards on 14 carries, 82 yards and one touchdown on four pass receptions and 70 yards and one TD on a lone pass completion.

== The Bomb goes out with a bang ==
The Steelers filled a chronic need for a prototype fullback with the acquisition of Johnson prior to the 1960 campaign. Coupled with a gimpy knee, aging roster and subpar line play, Tracy experienced a decline in workload and effectiveness one year later, a drop-off that mirrored that of the team as a whole.

On the heels of a fifth-place finish, team management decided that an infusion of youth was necessary. No longer part of the future, the 28-year-old Tracy was among the final roster cuts in the 1962 pre-season. When the veteran went unclaimed to the surprise of some in league circles, he was signed to the taxi squad.

In position to claim a Playoff Bowl berth, the Steelers activated Tracy off the taxi squad with four games left in the regular season. One week later, after rookie halfback Joe Womack sustained a knee injury that would end his career, the rejuvenated veteran got his chance against the St. Louis Cardinals in Pittsburgh. He responded with 72 yards in seven carries in a 19–7 triumph, one that gave his team sole possession of second place in the Eastern Conference.

In Week 13, Tracy rushed for 46 yards on 10 attempts and gained 11 more on two pass receptions in a 26–17 victory over the Philadelphia Eagles on the road. The Steelers closed out the regular season with a third consecutive triumph, this one by a 27-24 count over the Washington Redskins in Pittsburgh. The win clinched a berth in the Playoff Bowl, their first postseason appearance since the 1947 campaign.

=== Washington Redskins ===
Tracy saw action in eight games for the Steelers in 1963 before his Nov. 15 release. After the Redskins claimed him off waivers one day later, he saw action in two games the rest of the season. Tracy returned in 1964 to play all 14 games, one of them as a starter, before he retired at 31 years of age.
