= Rudy Hayes =

American football player (1935–2020)

No. 35, 36
- Position: Linebacker

Personal information
- Born: January 12, 1935; Pickens, South Carolina, U.S.
- Died: February 15, 2020 (aged 85); Pickens, South Carolina, U.S.
- Listed height: 6 ft 0 in (1.83 m)
- Listed weight: 217 lb (98 kg)

Career information
- High school: Pickens (SC)
- College: Clemson
- NFL draft: 1959: 20th round, 235th overall pick

Career history
- Pittsburgh Steelers (1959–1962)

Career NFL statistics
- Fumble recoveries: 2
- Sacks: 2
- Stats at Pro Football Reference

Rudy Hayes (January 12, 1935 – February 15, 2020) was an American professional football linebacker. He played for the Pittsburgh Steelers from 1959 to 1960 and in 1962.

He died on February 15, 2020, in Pickens, South Carolina at age 85.
