= Henry Clement =

American football player (born 1939)

No. 28
- Position: Tight end

Personal information
- Born: June 15, 1939 (age 87); New York, New York, U.S.
- Listed height: 6 ft 3 in (1.91 m)
- Listed weight: 195 lb (88 kg)

Career information
- High school: Westbury (Old Westbury, New York)
- College: North Carolina (1957–1960)
- NFL draft: 1961: 11th round, 146th overall pick

Career history
- Pittsburgh Steelers (1961); Pittsburgh Valley Ironmen (1963)

Career NFL statistics
- Receptions: 5
- Receiving yards: 65
- Stats at Pro Football Reference

Henry Littlefield Clement Jr. (born June 15, 1939) is an American former professional football player who was a tight end for one season with the Pittsburgh Steelers of the National Football League (NFL). Clement played college football at the University of North Carolina at Chapel Hill for the North Carolina Tar Heels.
