= John Henry Johnson =

American football player (1929–2011)

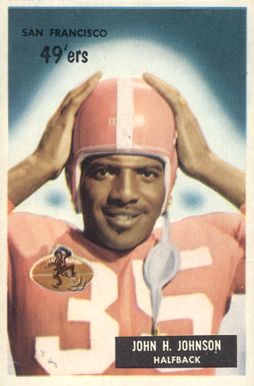
- c. 1955

No. 35
- Position: Fullback

Personal information
- Born: November 24, 1929; Waterproof, Louisiana, U.S.
- Died: June 3, 2011 (aged 81); Tracy, California, U.S.
- Listed height: 6 ft 2 in (1.88 m)
- Listed weight: 210 lb (95 kg)

Career information
- High school: Pittsburg (Pittsburg, California)
- College: Saint Mary's; Arizona State
- NFL draft: 1953: 2nd round, 18th overall pick

Career history
- Calgary Stampeders (1953); San Francisco 49ers (1954–1956); Detroit Lions (1957–1959); Pittsburgh Steelers (1960–1965); Houston Oilers (1966)

Awards and highlights
- NFL champion (1957); 2× Second-team All-Pro (1954, 1962); 4× Pro Bowl (1954, 1962–1964); San Francisco 49ers Hall of Fame; Pittsburgh Steelers Legends team; Pittsburgh Steelers Hall of Honor; Jeff Nicklin Memorial Trophy (1953)

Career professional statistics
- Rushing yards: 6,803
- Rushing average: 4.3
- Rushing touchdowns: 48
- Stats at Pro Football Reference
- Pro Football Hall of Fame

John Henry Johnson (November 24, 1929 – June 3, 2011) was an American professional football player who was a fullback in the National Football League (NFL), American Football League (AFL), and Western Interprovincial Football Union (WIFU). His first stint was in Canada in the WIFU (a forerunner league to today's Canadian Football League) for one season with the Calgary Stampeders. He then played in the NFL for the San Francisco 49ers, Detroit Lions, and Pittsburgh Steelers before spending his final season in the AFL with the Houston Oilers. Commonly referred to as simply John Henry, an allusion to the folk hero of the same name, Johnson was a tough and tenacious player who performed at a high level well into the tail end of his career.

After playing college football for the St. Mary's Gaels and Arizona State Sun Devils, Johnson was selected in the second round of the 1953 NFL draft by the Steelers, the 18th overall pick. He instead played one season of Canadian football for the Stampeders, in which he won the Jeff Nicklin Memorial Trophy as the league's most valuable player. He then signed with the 49ers, and played left halfback in San Francisco's famed "Million Dollar Backfield". He was traded to Detroit in 1957, and became the team's leading rusher en route to that year's NFL championship, their most recent.

His abilities seemingly in decline, Johnson was traded to Pittsburgh in 1960, where he had the most productive years of his career, recording two 1,000-yard rushing seasons. He is the second oldest player to record a 1,000-yard rushing season (behind only John Riggins), having achieved that mark for the final time on December 6, 1964, at the age of 35 years 12 days. He is the oldest player to rush for 200 or more yards in a game. A four-time Pro Bowl selection, Johnson ranked third on the NFL's all-time rushing yards list when he retired, but was best remembered by his peers for the mark he left with his blocking. He was elected to the Pro Football Hall of Fame in 1987.

== Early life ==
Johnson was born in northeastern Louisiana, at Waterproof in southern Tensas Parish. He played high school football in northern California at Pittsburg High School.

== College career ==
He played college football at Saint Mary's College of California in Moraga before transferring to Arizona State College in Tempe. While at Saint Mary's, sportswriters deemed Johnson "one of the fleetest and finest players on the Pacific Coast." The school dropped its football program after the 1950 season.

As a senior at Arizona State in 1952, he played left halfback and was recognized as one of the roughest and hardest runners in the country, and as one of the top defensive players as a safety. He also excelled as a punt returner, and had a two-game stretch in which he returned four punts for touchdowns. Johnson's running abilities made him a standout pro football prospect.

== Professional career ==
=== Calgary Stampeders ===
Selected 18th overall in the second round of the 1953 NFL draft by the Pittsburgh Steelers, Johnson instead played one season in Canada with the Calgary Stampeders of the Western Interprovincial Football Union (WIFU) in 1953. Johnson reasoned that Calgary had offered more money, but Steelers owner Art Rooney speculated that Johnson thought it was too cold in Pittsburgh. "He must have thought he was going to some resort up there," joked Rooney. He led the Stampeders in rushing that season with 107 carries for 648 yards, an average of six yards per carry with five touchdowns. In addition, Johnson caught 33 passes for 365 yards and three more touchdowns, returned 47 punts for 386 yards, and had a 104-yard kickoff return touchdown. He also starred on defense and intercepted five passes. He was awarded the Jeff Nicklin Memorial Trophy as the league's most valuable player. Johnson was also a leading WIFU All-Star vote receiver, but because he played both offense and defense so well voters split their votes and he was left off the team's "roster".

=== San Francisco 49ers ===
Johnson was signed by the San Francisco 49ers in 1954 as a halfback, where he joined Hugh McElhenny, Y. A. Tittle, and Joe Perry to form the 49ers' famed "Million Dollar Backfield". That year, the 49ers shattered the team record for rushing yards in a season. Johnson finished second in the league in rushing with 681 yards, behind only Perry, who picked up the majority of his 1,049 yards behind blocking from Johnson. Johnson scored nine touchdowns, which were the most for a season in his career. He was invited to his first Pro Bowl following the season, joining Tittle and Perry. Johnson earned second-team All-Pro honors from United Press International (UPI) and the New York Daily News.

For the remainder of his time in San Francisco, Johnson was unable to replicate the success of his rookie year, as his production dropped significantly in the following two seasons. He played in seven games in 1955 before injuring his shoulder against the Los Angeles Rams, and finished the year with only 19 carries for 69 yards and one touchdown. He was traded to the Detroit Lions following the 1956 season in exchange for fullback Bill Bowman and defensive back Bill Stits.

=== Detroit Lions ===
Lions head coach Buddy Parker saw Johnson's value as a blocker and moved him to fullback. In his first season with Detroit in 1957, he led the team in rushing, carrying for 621 yards and five touchdowns. In the 1957 NFL Championship Game, which was won by the Lions 59–14 over the Cleveland Browns, Johnson carried seven times for 34 yards, caught a 16-yard pass, and recovered a fumble on defense. Going into the 1958 season, the Lions looked to continue their success, and Johnson was expected to be the team's primary ball carrier. However, Johnson missed several games due to injuries, and the Lions finished with a 4–7–1 record and one of the league's worst rushing offenses.

In 1959, Johnson was suspended indefinitely by the Lions after he missed the team plane back to Detroit following a one-sided 33–7 loss to the 49ers on November 1 in which he carried the ball five times for only eight yards. To that point, the Lions had a 1–5 record, and coach George Wilson used Johnson's suspension as an opportunity to call out the team for its lack of "desire." Johnson was ultimately fined $1,000. Wilson took the brunt of the blame for Detroit's struggles in 1958 and 1959, but he questioned the resolve of some of the team's higher-paid players, including Johnson. Following the season, Johnson was traded to the Pittsburgh Steelers for two draft picks. "That's all we could get for him," explained Wilson.

=== Pittsburgh Steelers ===
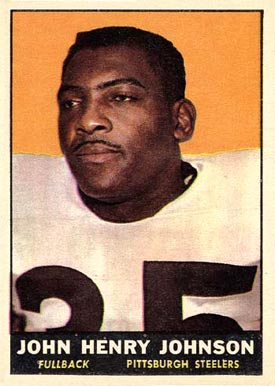
Johnson with the Steelers

The Steelers finally acquired Johnson in 1960, after having lost him to the CFL when they drafted him eight years prior. His career rejuvenated, he had his most productive years as a pro while in Pittsburgh. In his first season with the team, he rushed for 621 yards with a 5.3 yards-per-carry average, which included a career-high 87-yard score against the Philadelphia Eagles. He became the first Steelers player to rush for 1,000 yards in a season when he did so in 1962, and he repeated the feat in 1964. He made three straight Pro Bowl appearances, and was a second-team All-Pro selection by the AP, UPI, and Newspaper Enterprise Association in 1962. He became the oldest player in NFL history to eclipse 1,000 yards rushing in a season, finishing with 1,048 in 1964, but was later eclipsed by John Riggins. Johnson was 35 years, 12 days old when he passed the 1,000 yard mark on December 6, 1964. When Riggins accomplished the feat in 1984, he was 89 days older. In a game during the 1964 season against the Cleveland Browns, Johnson, then at age 34, carried 30 times for 200 yards and scored three touchdowns, out-dueling the great Jim Brown. It was only the ninth 200-yard rushing game in NFL history to that point, and the performance made him the oldest player to reach that mark, a record he still holds. Johnson's effort impressed Steelers president Dan Rooney, who remarked that "he got almost all the yardage by himself." Age and injuries caught up to Johnson in 1965, as he was limited to just three carries for 11 yards.

=== Houston Oilers ===
After playing out his option with the Steelers, in July 1966 Johnson signed as a free agent with the Houston Oilers of the American Football League. He joined the Oilers with the hope of helping the team win an AFL championship. However, the team finished the season last in the Eastern Division with a record of 3–11. Johnson retired after the season at the age of 37. He completed his NFL career having carried 1,571 times for 6,803 yards and 48 touchdowns, and picked up 1,478 yards on 186 pass receptions for seven receiving touchdowns.

== Playing style ==
Equally proficient as both a blocker and runner, Johnson was described as "the perfect NFL fullback". A talented runner, he ran with power both inside and outside the tackles, and he was as fast as McElhenny and Perry. Jim Brown called Johnson the greatest running back he had ever seen. He was also a very skilled safety and linebacker on defense. During a preseason game in 1955, Johnson hit Chicago Cardinals halfback Charley Trippi so hard that he fractured Trippi's face in multiple places, leaving him with a smashed nose and concussion and all but ended his career. "Football was like a combat zone," said Johnson. "I was always told that you carry the impact to the opponent. If you wait for it, the impact will be on you."

Perhaps the most notable aspect of Johnson's game was his blocking abilities, for which he received heavy praise. He took pride in it, saying "It gave me a chance to hit all those people who hit me all the time." Quarterback Bobby Layne, a teammate of Johnson with both the Lions and Steelers, listed Johnson as one of the one of "Pro Football's 11 Meanest Men" in an article for SPORT magazine in 1964. "By 'mean,' I mean vicious, unmanageable, consistently tough," said Layne. "I don't mean dirty." Layne also called Johnson his "bodyguard," saying "Half the good runners will get a passer killed if you keep them around long enough. But a quarterback hits the jackpot when he gets a combination runner-blocker like Johnson."

== Honors ==
Upon his retirement, Johnson was ranked fourth on pro football's all-time rushing yards list, behind Jim Brown, Jim Taylor, and his fellow Million Dollar Backfield teammate Perry. As of 2024, he is fifth on the Steelers franchise all-time rushing yards list, behind Franco Harris, Jerome Bettis, Willie Parker, and Le'Veon Bell. In 1987, he was selected to the Pro Football Hall of Fame, and chose Steelers owner Art Rooney as his presenter. Many of his contemporaries felt his induction was belated; he had been eligible for induction for the past fifteen years. The 49ers' "Million Dollar Backfield" is currently the only full-house backfield to have all four of its members enshrined in the Hall of Fame. Johnson is a member of the Pittsburgh Steelers Legends team, which honors the franchise's best players pre-1970. He was a charter inductee to the San Francisco 49ers Hall of Fame in 2009.

== NFL career statistics ==
Legend
	Won NFL Championship
	Led the league
**Bold**	Career high

Year	Team	Games		Rushing						Receiving					Fumbles	
Year	Team	GP	GS	Att	Yds	Avg	Y/G	Lng	TD	Rec	Yds	Avg	Lng	TD	Fum	FR
1954	SF	12	11	129	681	**5.3**	56.8	38	**9**	28	183	6.5	34	0	5	0
1955	SF	7	3	19	69	3.6	9.9	12	1	2	6	3.0	11	0	0	0
1956	SF	12	6	80	301	3.8	25.1	54	2	8	90	11.3	28	0	1	0
1957	DET	12	10	129	621	4.8	51.8	62	5	20	141	7.1	16	0	**9**	1
1958	DET	9	8	56	254	4.5	28.2	19	0	7	60	8.6	18	0	3	0
1959	DET	10	3	82	270	3.3	27.0	39	2	7	34	4.9	18	1	4	2
1960	PIT	12	10	118	621	**5.3**	51.8	**87**	2	12	112	9.3	26	1	5	0
1961	PIT	**14**	13	213	787	3.7	56.2	44	6	24	**262**	10.9	51	1	7	**3**
1962	PIT	**14**	**14**	**251**	**1,141**	4.5	**81.5**	40	7	**32**	226	7.1	18	**2**	5	0
1963	PIT	12	9	186	773	4.2	64.4	48	4	21	145	6.9	26	1	5	2
1964	PIT	**14**	**14**	235	1,048	4.5	74.9	45	7	17	69	4.1	21	1	4	1
1965	PIT	1	0	3	11	3.7	11.0	7	0	–	–	–	–	–	–	–
1966	HOU	**14**	3	70	226	3.2	16.1	33	3	8	150	**18.8**	**53**	0	–	–
Career		143	104	1,571	6,803	4.3	47.6	87	48	186	1,478	7.9	53	7	48	9

== Personal and later life ==
In November 1955, while on the sick list for the 49ers due to a shoulder injury, Johnson carried two women to safety out of a blazing apartment building in Oakland, California. One of the women was his pregnant wife, Barbara Johnson. The couple divorced in 1959, and a bench warrant was issued for Johnson after he fell $2,360 behind on alimony payments, concurrent with his suspension from the Lions for missing the team plane. After retiring as a player, he worked for Columbia Gas and later for Warner Communications. He had aspirations of coaching football, but the opportunity never arose.

Johnson died at age 81 in 2011 in Tracy, California. Several days later, it was announced that Johnson and his fellow Million Dollar Backfield teammate, Joe Perry, who died six weeks earlier, would have their brains examined by researchers at Boston University, who were studying head injuries in sports. Both men were suspected of having chronic traumatic encephalopathy (CTE), a disorder linked to repeated brain trauma. According to his daughter, Johnson could not talk or swallow in the final year of his life and also used a wheelchair. She told the San Francisco Chronicle that she hoped by donating her father's brain, it would "help with a cure."

Johnson was confirmed to have Stage 4 CTE, the most severe form of the disease. He was one of at least 345 NFL players to be diagnosed after death with this disease.
