= Buddy Dial =

American football player (1937–2008)

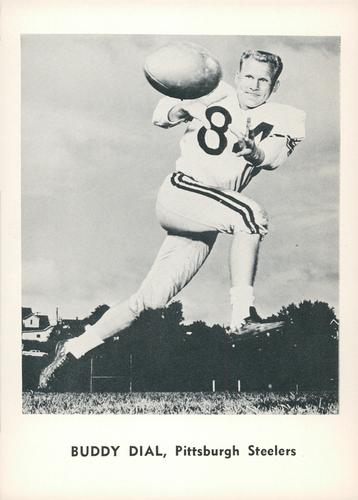

No. 83, 84, 26
- Position: Wide receiver

Personal information
- Born: January 17, 1937; Ponca City, Oklahoma, U.S.
- Died: February 29, 2008 (aged 71); Houston, Texas, U.S.
- Listed height: 6 ft 1 in (1.85 m)
- Listed weight: 194 lb (88 kg)

Career information
- High school: Magnolia (Magnolia, Texas)
- College: Rice (1955–1958)
- NFL draft: 1959: 2nd round, 22nd overall pick

Career history
- New York Giants (1959)*; Pittsburgh Steelers (1959–1963); Dallas Cowboys (1964–1968)
- * Offseason or practice squad member only

Awards and highlights
- Second-team All-Pro (1963); 2× Pro Bowl (1961, 1963); Pittsburgh Steelers Hall of Honor; Consensus All-American (1958); Second-team All-American (1957); 2× First-team All-SWC (1957, 1958); SWC sophomore lineman of the year (1956)

Career NFL statistics
- Receptions: 261
- Receiving yards: 5,463
- Receiving touchdowns: 44
- Stats at Pro Football Reference
- College Football Hall of Fame

Gilbert Leroy "Buddy" Dial (January 17, 1937 – February 29, 2008) was an American professional football player who was a wide receiver in the National Football League (NFL) for the Pittsburgh Steelers and Dallas Cowboys. He played college football at Rice University.

== Early life ==
Dial was born on January 17, 1937, in Ponca City, Oklahoma, to Lee and Martha (Brown) Dial, but grew up in Magnolia, Texas. He attended Magnolia High School, where he played six-man football, while being a three-time All-District end and linebacker. He helped his team achieve district titles in his junior and senior years, although they lost the Class B regional championship to Sugar Land High School in 1953 and to Barbers Hill High School in 1954. In 1955, as a senior, Dial scored 84 points. He was selected to the Texas High School Coaches Association All-Star Team, and played in the North-South football game.

In 2002, he was inducted into the National High School Hall of Fame.

== College career ==
Dial earned a scholarship to the Rice Institute (now known as Rice University) and played as a two-way end on the football team, being a ferocious defensive player and excellent blocker and receiver on offense. In 1956, he had 21 receptions for 357 yards, five touchdowns, and was selected sophomore lineman of the year in the Southwest Conference. In 1957, he made 21 receptions for 508 yards, and four touchdowns (all of which led the Southwest Conference), and was named All-Southwest Conference. He also led the nation with a 24.2 yards per reception average.

He contributed to Rice winning the 1957 conference championship, defying preseason predictions, and playing in the Cotton Bowl Classic (losing to Navy). Dial also was named to the All-Bowl All-Star team. At the end of the year, Rice was ranked eighth in the nation by the Associated Press, and number 7 by United Press International. The 1957 Rice team was led by two future NFL quarterbacks passing to Dial, Frank Ryan and King Hill.

In 1958, he caught 19 passes for 264 yards and four touchdowns. He was the team's co-captain and Most Valuable Player. He was selected consensus All-American and the Columbus Touchdown Club Lineman of the Year honors. He also received the George Martin Award as team MVP. After his senior year, he played in the College All-Star game against the NFL champion Baltimore Colts (who had defeated the New York Giants in "the greatest game ever played" 1958 championship game), the East-West Shrine Game and the Hula Bowl.

Dial recorded 61 receptions for 1,129 yards in his college career. He also posted 13 career receiving touchdowns, tying the school record set by James "Froggie" Williams.

In 1971, he was inducted into the Rice Athletics Hall of Fame. In 1993, he was inducted into the College Football Hall of Fame.

== Professional career ==
=== New York Giants ===
Dial was selected by the New York Giants in the second round (22nd overall) of the 1959 NFL draft. He was waived before the start of the season on September 22, 1959.

=== Pittsburgh Steelers ===
On September 24, 1959, Dial was claimed off waivers by the Pittsburgh Steelers, teaming him with quarterback Bobby Layne. Dial had a streak begin in the latter part of the season, which saw him score a touchdown in each of the last three games. In 1960, Dial set a team record by having a 24.3-yard average per reception. He tallied 40 receptions for 972 yards and nine touchdowns, with the first eight games of the year seeing him score a touchdown in each of them. In total, Dial had an 11-game streak with a touchdown scored, which was the third highest by a player in NFL history.

In 1961, Dial registered 53 receptions (tied for eighth in the league) for 1,047 yards (fifth in the league), a 19.8-yard average (third in the league), and 12 touchdowns (second in the league and a Steelers franchise record). He became the first player in team history to gain 1,000 receiving yards and also set a team record with 235 receiving yards in the sixth game against the Cleveland Browns, including the longest pass play in Steelers history (88 yards). He set a franchise record by scoring at least one touchdown in 11 consecutive games.

In 1962, he recorded 50 receptions for 981 and six touchdowns. After scoring a touchdown against the Dallas Cowboys, a loud cannon charge was set off in front of him (a Steelers tradition) as he ran into the endzone; this was memorialized by NFL Films as one of the league's greatest follies. The team made the Playoff Bowl, losing 10–17 against the Detroit Lions.

In 1963, he collected 60 receptions (fifth in the league) for 1,295 yards (second in the league and breaking his club record), a 21.6-yard average (led the league) and 9 touchdowns (tied for seventh in the league).

On January 1, 1964, with the team looking to shore up its defense, Dial was traded to the Dallas Cowboys in exchange for first-round draft choice Scott Appleton, who was selected by the Cowboys after previously agreeing to the deal with the Steelers. Appleton ended up signing with the Houston Oilers of the American Football League, who had also drafted him in the first round. The persistence both teams showed in their attempts to sign Appleton became known as the "Buddy Dial for Nothing" trade.

Dial left with team records of 229 receptions for 4,723 receiving yards, 42 touchdown receptions, single-season touchdown receptions (12), single-game receiving yards (235), single-season receiving yards (1,295), career yard-per-reception average (21.6) and single-season yards-per-reception (24.3). He was a two-time Pro Bowl selection.

In 2018, he was inducted into the Steelers Hall of Honor.

=== Dallas Cowboys ===
In 1964, Dial started in one game, after being limited with a thigh injury he suffered in training camp that required surgery. He registered 11 receptions for 178 yards and one touchdown. His best game came against the Steelers, in which he tallied five receptions for 100 yards.

In 1965, he started seven games, before being passed on the depth chart by second-year player Peter Gent. Dial recorded 17 receptions for 283 yards and one touchdown in the season.

In 1966, he was a backup behind Gent, starting in three games, while making 14 receptions for 252 yards and one touchdown. In 1967, he was placed on the injured reserve list after having back surgery. He announced his retirement in 1968. Dial finished his career with 261 receptions for 5,436 yards, a 20.8-yard average (second in league history), 44 touchdowns, and four carries for 14 yards.

== NFL career statistics ==
Legend
| | Led the league |
| **Bold** | Career high |

=== Regular season ===
| Year | Team | Games | | Receiving | | | | |
| Year | Team | GP | GS | Rec | Yds | Avg | Lng | TD |
|---|---|---|---|---|---|---|---|---|
| 1959 | PIT | 12 | 4 | 16 | 428 | **26.8** | 68 | 6 |
| 1960 | PIT | 12 | 12 | 40 | 972 | 24.3 | 70 | 9 |
| 1961 | PIT | 14 | 10 | 53 | 1,047 | 19.8 | **88** | **12** |
| 1962 | PIT | 14 | 10 | 50 | 981 | 19.6 | 62 | 6 |
| 1963 | PIT | 14 | 13 | **60** | **1,295** | 21.6 | 83 | 9 |
| 1964 | DAL | 10 | 2 | 11 | 178 | 16.2 | 41 | 0 |
| 1965 | DAL | 12 | 7 | 17 | 283 | 16.6 | 46 | 1 |
| 1966 | DAL | 10 | 3 | 14 | 252 | 18.0 | 39 | 1 |
| Career | | 98 | 61 | 261 | 5,436 | 20.8 | 88 | 44 |

== Personal life ==
Dial started Christian devotional services with the Pittsburgh Steelers and Dallas Cowboys, and played a seminal role with the Fellowship of Christian Athletes. He considered his roll in introducing open expressions of faith his most important contribution. While playing for the Steelers, he recorded an album of inspirational songs called Buddy Dial Sings on Word Records. In 1966, he recorded a single with Challenge Records 59352, "Baby" b/w "Back in the Old Days". It became a hit in various regional areas, topping the Dallas KLIF radio charts in late 1966 and early 1967, but failed to make the national charts.

Dial moved to the Houston area after retiring from the NFL, living in Tomball, Texas. He was both involved in business and was an active speaker for civic, church and charity events.

Injuries during his NFL career led to significant health problems brought on by the abuse of painkilling drugs (eventually losing a kidney), before receiving treatment in the late 1980s. On February 29, 2008, he died at the age of 71, of complications from prostate cancer and pneumonia.
