= Joe Womack =

American football player (born 1936)

No. 32, 41
- Position: Halfback

Personal information
- Born: December 10, 1936 (age 89); Fort Worth, Texas, U.S.
- Listed height: 5 ft 9 in (1.75 m)
- Listed weight: 210 lb (95 kg)

Career information
- High school: San Bernardino (San Bernardino, California)
- College: Los Angeles State
- NFL draft: 1960: 13th round, 150th overall pick

Career history
- Pittsburgh Steelers (1962); Orange County Ramblers (1967)

Career NFL statistics
- Rushing yards: 468
- Rushing average: 3.7
- Receptions: 6
- Receiving yards: 57
- Total touchdowns: 5
- Stats at Pro Football Reference

Joe Neil Womack (born December 10, 1936) is an American former professional football player who was a halfback for one season with the Pittsburgh Steelers of the National Football League (NFL). He played college football for the Los Angeles State Diablos (now Cal State Los Angeles). Womack was selected by the Steelers in the 13th round of the 1960 NFL draft.
