= Ron Stehouwer =

American football player (1937–2007)

No. 68
- Position: Guard

Personal information
- Born: February 4, 1937; Hopkins, Michigan, U.S.
- Died: January 18, 2007 (aged 69); San Antonio, Texas, U.S.
- Listed height: 6 ft 2 in (1.88 m)
- Listed weight: 230 lb (104 kg)

Career information
- High school: Wayland (MI)
- College: Colorado State
- NFL draft: 1959: 12th round, 136th overall pick

Career history
- Detroit Lions (1960)*; Pittsburgh Steelers (1960–1964)
- * Offseason or practice squad member only

Career NFL statistics
- Games played: 68
- Games started: 18
- Fumble recoveries: 2
- Stats at Pro Football Reference

Ron Stehouwer (February 4, 1937 – January 18, 2007) was an American professional football guard. He played for the Pittsburgh Steelers from 1960 to 1964.

He died on January 18, 2007, in San Antonio, Texas at age 69.
