= Buzz Nutter =

American football player (1931–2008)

No. 50, 51
- Positions: Center, linebacker

Personal information
- Born: February 16, 1931; Summersville, West Virginia, U.S.
- Died: April 12, 2008 (aged 77); La Plata, Maryland, U.S.
- Listed height: 6 ft 4 in (1.93 m)
- Listed weight: 230 lb (104 kg)

Career information
- High school: Vinson
- College: Virginia Tech
- NFL draft: 1953: 12th round, 136th overall pick

Career history
- Baltimore Colts (1954–1960); Pittsburgh Steelers (1961–1964); Baltimore Colts (1965)

Awards and highlights
- 2× NFL champion (1958, 1959); Pro Bowl (1962); Virginia Tech Sports Hall of Fame (1985)

Career NFL statistics
- Games played: 153
- Games started: 135
- Fumble recoveries: 7
- Stats at Pro Football Reference

Madison Monroe "Buzz" Nutter (February 16, 1931 – April 12, 2008) was an American professional football center in the National Football League (NFL) for the Baltimore Colts and Pittsburgh Steelers. He played college football at Virginia Tech.

== Early life ==
Nutter was born in Summersville, West Virginia, and grew up in Huntington, West Virginia, where he acquired the nickname "Buzz" as a young man. He attended and played high school football at Vinson High School.

== College career ==
Nutter attended and played college football at Virginia Tech. After his senior season, he became the first player from Virginia Tech drafted into the NFL, despite the team going 0-10, 2-8 and 5-6 the final three seasons of his career. Nutter was inducted into the Virginia Tech Sports Hall of Fame in 1985.

== Professional career ==
Nutter was selected in the 12th round of the 1953 NFL draft by the Washington Redskins. He failed to make the team in the offseason and moved back to West Virginia to work in a steel mill. He returned to the NFL in 1954 with the Baltimore Colts, where he played for seven seasons and won consecutive NFL Championship titles (1958–1959). Nutter was traded to the Pittsburgh Steelers, along with Eugene Lipscomb, in 1961 for wide receiver Jimmy Orr. Nutter played in Pittsburgh for four seasons and was selected for the Pro Bowl in 1962.

In 1965, he returned to the Colts for his final professional season.

== Personal life ==
After retiring from football, Nutter moved to La Plata, Maryland, and started a beverage distribution company in Waldorf, Maryland, that he ran for more than 40 years. The company was named Center Distributors after his football position.

Nutter's wife of 44 years, Carole, a devout Catholic, died in 1997. Two days before her death, in a service that took place in his wife's hospital room, Nutter converted to Catholicism after being a lifelong Methodist. They had four children and ten grandchildren.

Nutter died on April 12, 2008, of heart failure at Civista Medical Center in La Plata.
