= 1961 Los Angeles Rams season =

NFL team season

- Program for the December 9 game against the visiting Baltimore Colts at LA Memorial Coliseum
- Owner: Dan Reeves
- Head coach: Bob Waterfield
- Home stadium: Los Angeles Memorial Coliseum

Results
- Record: 4–10
- Division place: 6th NFL Western
- Playoffs: Did not qualify

Uniform
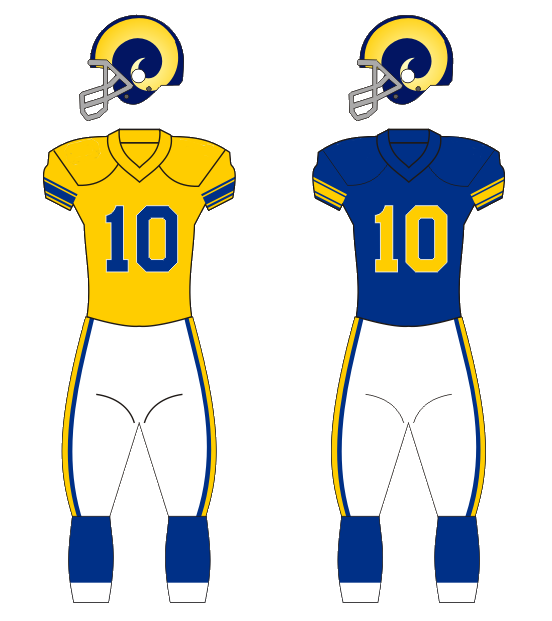

The 1961 Los Angeles Rams season was the team's 24th year with the National Football League and the 16th season in Los Angeles. The team lost six of its first seven games, en route to a 4–10 record and a sixth place finish in the NFL's Western Conference.

== Roster ==
1961 Los Angeles Rams roster
Quarterbacks (QB): 12 Zeke Bratkowski P; 15 Frank Ryan; Running backs (RB): 26 Jon Arnett; 27 Pervis Atkins; 22 Dick Bass; 34 Joe Marconi P; 36 Frank Williams; 24 Tommy Wilson; Wide receivers (WR): 81 Carroll Dale; 33 Ollie Matson; Tight ends (TE): 25 Duane Allen; 82 Jim Phillips	Offensive linemen (OL): 78 Jim Boeke T; 73 Charley Cowan G; 62 Willie Hector T; 64 Roy Hord G; 56 Art Hunter C; 71 Joe Scibelli G; 61 Bruce Tarbox T; 70 Frank Varrichione T; Defensive linemen (DL): 74 John Baker DE; 67 Urban Henry DT; 75 Deacon Jones DE; 76 John LoVetere DT; 85 Lamar Lundy DE; 77 George Strugar DT	Linebackers (LB): 57 Bill Jobko OLB; 84 Bob Long OLB; 86 Marlin McKeever MLB; 32 Jack Pardee OLB; 48 Les Richter MLB; Defensive backs (DB): 17 Charley Britt SS; 43 Ross Coyle FS; 41 Lindon Crow SS/CB; 46 Alvin Hall CB; 83 Elbert Kimbrough SS; 21 Eddie Meador CB; 35 Clendon Thomas FS; Special teams (ST): 11 Danny Villanueva K/P	Rookies in italics

== Schedule ==
Week	Date	Opponent	Result	Record	Venue	Attendance
1	September 17	at **Baltimore Colts**	**L** 24–27	0–1	Memorial Stadium	54,259
2	September 23	**Chicago Bears**	**L** 17–21	0–2	Los Angeles Memorial Coliseum	53,315
3	October 1	Pittsburgh Steelers	**W** 24–14	1–2	Los Angeles Memorial Coliseum	40,707
4	October 8	at **San Francisco 49ers**	**L** 0–35	1–3	Kezar Stadium	59,004
5	October 15	at **Detroit Lions**	**L** 13–14	1–4	Tiger Stadium	45,873
6	October 22	at New York Giants	**L** 14–24	1–5	Yankee Stadium	63,053
7	October 29	**Detroit Lions**	**L** 10–28	1–6	Los Angeles Memorial Coliseum	49,123
8	November 5	**Minnesota Vikings**	**W** 31–17	2–6	Los Angeles Memorial Coliseum	38,594
9	November 12	**San Francisco 49ers**	**W** 17–7	3–6	Los Angeles Memorial Coliseum	63,766
10	November 19	at **Green Bay Packers**	**L** 17–35	3–7	City Stadium	38,669
11	November 26	at **Chicago Bears**	**L** 24–28	3–8	Wrigley Field	45,965
12	December 3	at **Minnesota Vikings**	**L** 21–42	3–9	Metropolitan Stadium	30,068
13	December 9	**Baltimore Colts**	**W** 34–17	4–9	Los Angeles Memorial Coliseum	41,268
14	December 17	**Green Bay Packers**	**L** 17–24	4–10	Los Angeles Memorial Coliseum	49,169
Note: Intra-conference opponents are in **bold** text.

== Standings ==
NFL Western Conference
	W	L	T	PCT	CONF	PF	PA	STK
Green Bay Packers	11	3	0	.786	9–3	391	223	W1
Detroit Lions	8	5	1	.615	7–4–1	270	258	L1
Chicago Bears	8	6	0	.571	7–5	326	302	W2
Baltimore Colts	8	6	0	.571	6–6	302	307	W1
San Francisco 49ers	7	6	1	.538	6–5–1	346	272	L1
Los Angeles Rams	4	10	0	.286	3–9	263	333	L1
Minnesota Vikings	3	11	0	.214	3–9	285	407	L2

Note: Tie games were not officially counted in the standings until 1972.

NFL Eastern Conference
	W	L	T	PCT	CONF	PF	PA	STK
New York Giants	10	3	1	.769	9–2–1	368	220	T1
Philadelphia Eagles	10	4	0	.714	8–4	361	297	W1
Cleveland Browns	8	5	1	.615	8–3–1	319	270	T1
St. Louis Cardinals	7	7	0	.500	7–5	279	267	W3
Pittsburgh Steelers	6	8	0	.429	5–7	295	287	L1
Dallas Cowboys	4	9	1	.308	2–9–1	236	380	L4
Washington Redskins	1	12	1	.077	1–10–1	174	392	W1

Note: Tie games were not officially counted in the standings until 1972.
