= 1961 Cleveland Browns season =

NFL team season

- Head coach: Paul Brown
- Home stadium: Cleveland Stadium

Results
- Record: 8–5–1
- Division place: 3rd NFL Eastern
- Playoffs: Did not qualify
- Pro Bowlers: Milt Plum, QB; John Morrow, C Bob Gain, DT; Mike McCormack, RT; Jim Ray Smith, G Jim Brown, FB

The 1961 Cleveland Browns season marked the team's 12th season in the National Football League (NFL) and was the 16th in franchise history.

== Offseason ==
On March 22, Dave R. Jones sold the Browns to a group headed by Arthur B. Modell.

=== Draft ===
1961 Cleveland Browns draft
Round	Pick	Player	Position	College	Notes
1	10	Bobby Crespino	End	Ole Miss	
2	27	Ed Nutting	Offensive tackle	Georgia Tech	
4	55	John Brown	Offensive tackle	Syracuse	
5	69	Mike Lucci	Linebacker	Tennessee	
6	79	Frank Parker	Offensive tackle	Oklahoma State	
7	97	Preston Powell	Running back	Grambling	
8	110	Fred Cox *	Kicker	Pittsburgh	
8	111	John Frongillo	Offensive tackle	Baylor	
9	125	Jake Gibbs	Quarterback	Ole Miss	
10	129	Wayne Wolff	Guard	Wake Forest	
10	139	Ken Ericson	End	Syracuse	
11	153	Billy Gault	Halfback	TCU	
Made roster * Made at least one Pro Bowl during career

=== Undrafted free agents ===
1961 undrafted free agents of note
Player	Position	College
Dennis Penza	Defensive back	St. Norbert

== Personnel ==
=== Staff/Coaches ===
1961 Cleveland Browns staff
Front office: Owner/CEO – Art Modell; Coaches: Head coach – Paul Brown; Offensive coaches: Running backs – Howard Brinker; Offensive guards – Fritz Heisler; Offensive tackles – Ed Ulinski; Offensive backfield and ends – Paul Bixler	Defensive coaches: Defensive line – Dick Evans; Linebackers – Ed Ulinski; Strength & Conditioning: Athletic trainer – Leo Murphy; Equipment manager – Morris Kono

=== Roster ===
1961 Cleveland Browns roster
Quarterbacks: 18 Len Dawson; 16 Milt Plum; Running backs: 32 Jim Brown; 49 Bobby Mitchell; 40 Preston Powell; 22 Tom Watkins; Wide receivers: 42 Bobby Crespino; 85 Charley Ferguson; 88 Rich Kreitling; 26 Ray Renfro; Tight ends: 81 Leon Clarke; 86 Gern Nagler	Offensive linemen: 70 Errol Linden T; 74 Mike McCormack T; 56 John Morrow C; 62 Duane Putnam G; 77 Dick Schafrath T; 64 Jim Ray Smith G; 60 John Wooten G; Defensive linemen: 83 Johnny Brewer DE; 79 Bob Gain DT; 82 Jim Houston DE; 72 Floyd Peters DT; 68 Larry Stephens DT; 84 Paul Wiggin DE	Linebackers: 50 Vince Costello MLB/OLB; 35 Galen Fiss OLB; 52 Dave Lloyd MLB; 34 Walt Michaels OLB; Defensive backs: 20 Ross Fichtner CB/S; 46 Don Fleming SS; 24 Bobby Franklin FS; 30 Bernie Parrish CB; 44 Jim Shofner CB; Special teams: 38 Sam Baker P; 76 Lou Groza K	Reserve list: 66 Gene Hickerson G (IR); 78 Ed Nutting T (IR); rookies in italics

== Exhibition schedule ==
Game	Date	Opponent	Result	Record	Venue	Attendance	Sources
1	August 11	at Detroit Lions	L 7–35	0–1	Tiger Stadium	25,602	
2	August 20	at San Francisco 49ers	W 27–24	1–1	Kezar Stadium	38,759	
3	August 25	at Los Angeles Rams	W 34–17	2–1	Los Angeles Coliseum	40,086	
4	September 2	vs. Pittsburgh Steelers	W 38–6	3–1	Rubber Bowl	27,758	
5	September 9	Detroit Lions	L 17–35	3–2	Cleveland Municipal Stadium	41,374	

== Regular season schedule ==
Game	Date	Opponent	Result	Record	Venue	Attendance	Recap	Sources
1	September 17	at **Philadelphia Eagles**	**L** 20–27	0–1	Franklin Field	60,671	Recap	
2	September 24	**St. Louis Cardinals**	**W** 20–17	1–1	Cleveland Stadium	50,443	Recap	
3	October 1	**Dallas Cowboys**	**W** 25–7	2–1	Cleveland Stadium	43,638	Recap	
4	October 8	**Washington Redskins**	**W** 31–7	3–1	Cleveland Stadium	46,186	Recap	
5	October 15	Green Bay Packers	**L** 17–49	3–2	Cleveland Stadium	75,042	Recap	
6	October 22	at **Pittsburgh Steelers**	**W** 30–28	4–2	Forbes Field	29,266	Recap	
7	October 29	at **St. Louis Cardinals**	**W** 21–10	5–2	Sportsman's Park	26,696	Recap	
8	November 5	**Pittsburgh Steelers**	**L** 13–17	5–3	Cleveland Stadium	62,723	Recap	
9	November 12	at **Washington Redskins**	**W** 17–6	6–3	D.C. Stadium	28,975	Recap	
10	November 19	**Philadelphia Eagles**	**W** 45–24	7–3	Cleveland Stadium	68,399	Recap	
11	November 26	**New York Giants**	**L** 21–37	7–4	Cleveland Stadium	80,455	Recap	
12	December 3	at **Dallas Cowboys**	**W** 38–17	8–4	Cotton Bowl	23,500	Recap	
13	December 10	at Chicago Bears	**L** 14–17	8–5	Wrigley Field	38,717	Recap	
14	December 17	at **New York Giants**	**T** 7–7	8–5–1	**Yankee Stadium**	61,084	Recap	
Note: Intra-division opponents are in **bold** text.

== Standings ==
NFL Eastern Conference
	W	L	T	PCT	CONF	PF	PA	STK
New York Giants	10	3	1	.769	9–2–1	368	220	T1
Philadelphia Eagles	10	4	0	.714	8–4	361	297	W1
Cleveland Browns	8	5	1	.615	8–3–1	319	270	T1
St. Louis Cardinals	7	7	0	.500	7–5	279	267	W3
Pittsburgh Steelers	6	8	0	.429	5–7	295	287	L1
Dallas Cowboys	4	9	1	.308	2–9–1	236	380	L4
Washington Redskins	1	12	1	.077	1–10–1	174	392	W1

Note: Tie games were not officially counted in the standings until 1972.

NFL Western Conference
	W	L	T	PCT	CONF	PF	PA	STK
Green Bay Packers	11	3	0	.786	9–3	391	223	W1
Detroit Lions	8	5	1	.615	7–4–1	270	258	L1
Chicago Bears	8	6	0	.571	7–5	326	302	W2
Baltimore Colts	8	6	0	.571	6–6	302	307	W1
San Francisco 49ers	7	6	1	.538	6–5–1	346	272	L1
Los Angeles Rams	4	10	0	.286	3–9	263	333	L1
Minnesota Vikings	3	11	0	.214	3–9	285	407	L2

Note: Tie games were not officially counted in the standings until 1972.

== Awards and records ==
- Jim Brown, NFL rushing leader, 1,408 yards
- Milt Plum, NFL leader, passing yards, (2416)

=== Milestones ===
- Jim Brown, Fourth Consecutive 1,000 yard season
- Jim Brown, Fifth Consecutive Rushing Title
