= 1961 Washington Redskins season =

NFL team season

- Owner: George Preston Marshall
- General manager: Dick McCann
- Head coach: Bill McPeak
- Home stadium: D.C. Stadium

Results
- Record: 1–12–1
- Division place: 7th NFL Eastern
- Playoffs: Did not qualify

The 1961 Washington Redskins season was the team's 30th in the National Football League. The team tried to improve on their 1–9–2 record from 1960. However, under their first-year coach Bill McPeak, their 1–12–1 performance during the season placed the Redskins in last-place in the NFL Eastern Conference. Their lone victory of the season came in the final game of the season at home against the Dallas Cowboys, 34–24. The 1961 campaign remains the worst season record in Redskins history.

This season was also the first one in their new stadium, D.C. Stadium, later renamed RFK Stadium.

== Offseason ==
=== NFL draft ===
1961 Washington Redskins draft
Round	Pick	Player	Position	College	Notes
1	2	Norm Snead *	Quarterback	Wake Forest	
3	39	Jim Cunningham	Fullback	Pittsburgh	
Made roster * Made at least one Pro Bowl during career

=== Undrafted free agents ===
1961 undrafted free agents of note
Player	Position	College
Don Martis	Fullback	Valparaiso

== Roster ==
1961 Washington Redskins roster
Quarterbacks (QB): 15 George Izo; 16 Norm Snead; Running backs (RB): 31 Don Bosseler; 30 Jim Cunningham; 40 Sam Horner CB/P; 47 Dick James FS/P; 26 Mike Sommer; Wide receivers (WR): 87 Fred Dugan; 84 Tom Osborne; Tight ends (TE): 42 Bill Anderson; 80 Steve Junker	Offensive linemen (OL): 56 Ed Beatty C; 67 Bernie Darre G; 70 Ray Lemek T; 73 Riley Mattson T; 61 Fran O'Brien G; 65 Vince Promuto G; 51 Jim Schrader C; Defensive linemen (DL): 85 Gene Cronin DE; 78 Don Lawrence DT; 86 John Paluck DE; 72 Joe Rutgens DT; 71 Andy Stynchula DE; 79 Bob Toneff DT	Linebackers (LB): 63 Rod Breedlove OLB; 50 Fred Hageman MLB; 88 Dick Lasse OLB; 83 Roy Wilkins OLB; Defensive backs (DB): 46 Dale Hackbart CB/SS; 43 Jim Kerr FS/CB; 25 Joe Krakoski SS; 21 Doyle Schick SS; 48 Ben Scotti CB; 41 Jim Steffen CB; 32 Jim Wulff FS; Special teams (ST): 89 John Aveni K/WR	Reserve: 60 Robert Khayat K (IR); Rookies in italics

== Preseason ==
Week	Date	Opponent	Result	Record	Venue	Attendance
1	August 11	at Los Angeles Rams	L 7–26	0–1	Los Angeles Memorial Coliseum	59,361
2	August 19	vs. Chicago Bears	L 13–29	0–2	Johnson Hagood Stadium (Charleston, SC)	8,000
3	August 26	vs. Baltimore Colts	L 7–41	0–3	Foreman Field (Norfolk, VA)	20,302
4	September 2	vs. Philadelphia Eagles	L 10–17	0–4	Bristol Motor Speedway (Bristol, TN)	8,500
5	September 9	vs. Green Bay Packers	L 24–31	0–5	A. J. McClung Memorial Stadium (Columbus, GA)	12,000

== Regular season ==
=== Schedule ===
Week	Date	Opponent	Result	Record	Venue	Attendance	Recap
1	September 17	at San Francisco 49ers	**L** 3–35	0–1	Kezar Stadium	43,142	Recap
2	September 24	at **Philadelphia Eagles**	**L** 7–14	0–2	Franklin Field	50,108	Recap
3	October 1	**New York Giants**	**L** 21–24	0–3	D.C. Stadium	36,767	Recap
4	October 8	at **Cleveland Browns**	**L** 7–31	0–4	Cleveland Municipal Stadium	46,186	Recap
5	October 15	at **Pittsburgh Steelers**	**L** 0–20	0–5	Forbes Field	15,072	Recap
6	October 22	**St. Louis Cardinals**	**L** 0–24	0–6	D.C. Stadium	28,037	Recap
7	October 29	**Philadelphia Eagles**	**L** 24–27	0–7	D.C. Stadium	31,066	Recap
8	November 5	at **New York Giants**	**L** 0–53	0–8	Yankee Stadium	56,077	Recap
9	November 12	**Cleveland Browns**	**L** 6–17	0–9	D.C. Stadium	28,975	Recap
10	November 19	at **Dallas Cowboys**	**T** 28–28	0–9–1	Cotton Bowl	17,500	Recap
11	November 26	Baltimore Colts	**L** 6–27	0–10–1	D.C. Stadium	41,062	Recap
12	December 3	at **St. Louis Cardinals**	**L** 24–38	0–11–1	Busch Stadium	16,204	Recap
13	December 10	**Pittsburgh Steelers**	**L** 14–30	0–12–1	D.C. Stadium	21,134	Recap
14	December 17	**Dallas Cowboys**	**W** 34–24	1–12–1	D.C. Stadium	21,451	Recap
Note: Intra-conference opponents are in **bold** text.

== Standings ==
NFL Eastern Conference
	W	L	T	PCT	CONF	PF	PA	STK
New York Giants	10	3	1	.769	9–2–1	368	220	T1
Philadelphia Eagles	10	4	0	.714	8–4	361	297	W1
Cleveland Browns	8	5	1	.615	8–3–1	319	270	T1
St. Louis Cardinals	7	7	0	.500	7–5	279	267	W3
Pittsburgh Steelers	6	8	0	.429	5–7	295	287	L1
Dallas Cowboys	4	9	1	.308	2–9–1	236	380	L4
Washington Redskins	1	12	1	.077	1–10–1	174	392	W1

Note: Tie games were not officially counted in the standings until 1972.
