= 1961 Green Bay Packers season =

NFL team season (7th championship)

- General manager: Vince Lombardi
- Head coach: Vince Lombardi
- Home stadium: City Stadium; Milwaukee County Stadium

Results
- Record: 11–3
- Division place: 1st NFL Western
- Playoffs: Won NFL Championship (vs. Giants) 37–0

The 1961 Green Bay Packers season was their 43rd season overall and their 41st season in the National Football League. The team finished with an 11–3 record under third-year head coach Vince Lombardi, earning them a first-place finish in the Western Conference. The Packers ended the season by shutting out the New York Giants 37–0 in the NFL Championship Game, the first title game ever played in Green Bay. This was the Packers seventh NFL league championship. The 1961 Packers also featured 12 future Hall of Famers, the most on any single team in NFL history.

The 1961 season was the first in which the Packers wore their trademark capital "G" logo on their helmets.

== Offseason ==
=== NFL draft ===
The 1961 NFL draft was held in late December 1960.

1961 Green Bay Packers draft
Round	Pick	Player	Position	College	Notes
1	12	Herb Adderley * ^{†}	Cornerback	Michigan State	
2	26	Ron Kostelnik	Defensive tackle	Cincinnati	
3	40	Phil Nugent	Defensive back	Tulane	
4	54	Paul Dudley	Running back	Arkansas	
4	56	Joe LeSage	Guard	Tulane	
5	68	Jack Novak	Guard	Miami (FL)	
6	82	Lee Folkins *	Tight end	Washington	
7	96	Lewis Johnson	Back	Florida A&M	
9	124	Vester Flanagan	Tackle	Humboldt State	
10	128	Roger Hagberg	Fullback	Minnesota	
10	138	Buck McLeod	Tackle	Baylor	
11	152	Val Keckin	Back	Mississippi Southern	
12	166	John Denvir	Tackle	Colorado	
13	180	Elijah Pitts	Running back	Philander Smith	
14	194	Nelson Toburen	Linebacker	Wichita	
15	208	Ray Lardani	Tackle	Miami (FL)	
16	222	Clarence Mason	End	Bowling Green	
17	236	Jim Brewington	Tackle	North Carolina Central	
18	250	Arthur Sims	Back	Texas A&M	
19	264	Leland Bondhus	Tackle	South Dakota State	
20	278	Ray Ratkowski	Back	Notre Dame	
Made roster † Pro Football Hall of Fame * Made at least one Pro Bowl during career

=== Undrafted free agents ===
1961 undrafted free agents of note
Player	Position	College
Bob Beaver	Guard	Louisiana-Monroe
Clarence Lacina	Defensive end	Wisconsin–Superior
Bill Poland	Fullback	Rhode Island
John Rollins	Running back	Rhode Island

== Personnel ==
=== Staff ===
1961 Green Bay Packers staff
Front office: President – Dominic Olejniczak; Director of player personnel – Dick Voris; Head coaches: Head coach – Vince Lombardi; Offensive coaches: Offensive backs – Red Cochran; Ends – Dick Voris; Offensive line – Bill Austin	Defensive coaches: Defensive line – Phil Bengtson; Defensive backs – Norb Hecker

=== Roster ===
1961 Green Bay Packers roster
Quarterbacks (QB): 10 John Roach; 15 Bart Starr; Running backs (RB): 5 Paul Hornung K; 25 Tom Moore; 22 Elijah Pitts; 31 Jim Taylor; Wide receivers (WR): 33 Lew Carpenter; 86 Boyd Dowler P; 85 Max McGee P; Tight ends (TE): 81 Lee Folkins; 84 Gary Knafelc; 88 Ron Kramer	Offensive linemen (OL): 75 Forrest Gregg T / G; 53 Ken Iman G/C; 78 Norm Masters T; 51 Jim Ringo C; 76 Bob Skoronski T; 63 Fuzzy Thurston G; Defensive linemen (DL): 72 Ben Davidson DE; 87 Willie Davis DE; 79 Dave Hanner DT; 74 Henry Jordan DT; 77 Ron Kostelnik DT; 83 Bill Quinlan DE	Linebackers (LB): 65 Tom Bettis OLB/MLB; 58 Dan Currie OLB; 71 Bill Forester OLB; 66 Ray Nitschke MLB; 61 Nelson Toburen OLB; Defensive backs (DB): 26 Herb Adderley CB; 46 Hank Gremminger CB; 27 John Symank SS; 45 Emlen Tunnell FS; 47 Jesse Whittenton CB; 24 Willie Wood FS; Special teams (ST): 3 Ben Agajanian K	Reserve: 64 Jerry Kramer G (IR); Rookies in italics

=== Depth chart ===
Defense

FS
Hank Gremminger
⋅

WLB	MLB	SLB
⋅	Ray Nitschke	⋅
⋅	⋅	⋅

SS
Willie Wood
⋅

CB
Herb Adderley
⋅

DE	DT	DT	DE
Bill Quinlan	Henry Jordan	Dave Hanner	Willie Davis
⋅	⋅	⋅	⋅

CB
Jesse Whittenton
⋅

Offense

FL
Boyd Dowler
⋅

LT	LG	C	RG	RT
Bob Skoronski	Fuzzy Thurston	Jim Ringo	Jerry Kramer	Forrest Gregg
⋅	⋅	⋅	(Forrest Gregg)	Norm Masters

TE
Ron Kramer
⋅

SE
Max McGee
⋅

QB
Bart Starr
⋅

RB
Paul Hornung
⋅

FB
Jim Taylor
⋅

Special teams
PK Paul Hornung
P Boyd Dowler
KR Herb Adderley
PR Willie Wood

== Preseason ==
Week	Date	Opponent	Result	Record	Venue	Recap
1	August 11	at Dallas Cowboys	W 30–7	1–0	Cotton Bowl	Recap
2	August 18	at St. Louis Cardinals	W 31–10	2–0	Sportsman's Park	Recap
3	August 26	Chicago Bears	W 24–14	3–0	Milwaukee County Stadium	Recap
4	September 4	New York Giants	W 20–17	4–0	City Stadium	Recap
5	September 9	vs. Washington Redskins	W 31–24	5–0	A. J. McClung Memorial Stadium	Recap

== Regular season ==
Despite being named NFL MVP, Paul Hornung was briefly lost to the military. In response to the construction of the Berlin Wall, the Department of Defense activated thousands of reservists. Two dozen football players were activated, including Paul Hornung, Boyd Dowler, and Ray Nitschke. On November 14, Hornung was to report to Fort Riley in north central Kansas. Wisconsin residents were so upset that Republican senator Alexander Wiley and Democratic congressman Clement Zablocki requested deferments for the players. On October 18, the final word was that the players had to serve. Hornung missed the November 19 game in Green Bay against the Rams, but was flown from Fort Riley to Detroit for the November 23 Thanksgiving Day game against the Lions at Tiger Stadium. Hornung kicked a field goal and two extra points in the 17–9 victory.

Injured in late October, right guard Jerry Kramer was sidelined for the remainder of the season. Forrest Gregg moved in from right tackle to guard, and Norm Masters started at right tackle.

=== Schedule ===
Week	Date	Opponent	Result	Record	Venue	Recap
1	September 17	**Detroit Lions**	**L** 13–17	0–1	Milwaukee County Stadium	Recap
2	September 24	**San Francisco 49ers**	**W** 30–10	1–1	City Stadium	Recap
3	October 1	**Chicago Bears**	**W** 24–0	2–1	City Stadium	Recap
4	October 8	**Baltimore Colts**	**W** 45–7	3–1	City Stadium	Recap
5	October 15	at Cleveland Browns	**W** 49–17	4–1	Cleveland Stadium	Recap
6	October 22	at **Minnesota Vikings**	**W** 33–7	5–1	Metropolitan Stadium	Recap
7	October 29	**Minnesota Vikings**	**W** 28–10	6–1	Milwaukee County Stadium	Recap
8	November 5	at **Baltimore Colts**	**L** 21–45	6–2	Memorial Stadium	Recap
9	November 12	at **Chicago Bears**	**W** 31–28	7–2	Wrigley Field	Recap
10	November 19	**Los Angeles Rams**	**W** 35–17	8–2	City Stadium	Recap
11	November 23	at **Detroit Lions**	**W** 17–9	9–2	Tiger Stadium	Recap
12	December 3	New York Giants	**W** 20–17	10–2	Milwaukee County Stadium	Recap
13	December 10	at **San Francisco 49ers**	**L** 21–22	10–3	Kezar Stadium	Recap
14	December 17	at **Los Angeles Rams**	**W** 24–17	11–3	Los Angeles Memorial Coliseum	Recap
Note: Intra-conference opponents are in **bold** text.

=== Season summary ===
==== Week 1: vs. Detroit ====
Week 1: Detroit Lions at Green Bay Packers

Quarter	1	2	3	4	Total
**Lions**	7	7	0	3	**17**
Packers	7	3	0	3	**13**

at Milwaukee County Stadium, Milwaukee, Wisconsin

- Date: September 17
- Game time: 12:30 p.m. CDT
- Game weather: 60 °F (16 °C), relative humidity 63%, wind 9 mph
- Game attendance: 44,307
- Referee: Bud Brubaker
- TV: CBS
- Box Score

Game information

Lions

Packers

Scoring summary

Quarter	Time	Drive			Team	Scoring information	Score	
Quarter	Time	Plays	Yards	TOP	Team	Scoring information	DET	GB
1					GB	Taylor 1-yard touchdown run, Hornung kick good	0	7
1					DET	Pietrosante 1-yard touchdown run, Martin kick good	7	7
2					DET	Pietrosante 15-yard touchdown run, Martin kick good	14	7
2					GB	15-yard field goal by Hornung	14	10
4					GB	26-yard field goal by Hornung	14	13
4					DET	44-yard field goal by Martin	17	13
"TOP" = time of possession. For other American football terms, see Glossary of American football.							17	13

==== Week 2: vs. San Francisco ====
Week 2: San Francisco 49ers at Green Bay Packers

Quarter	1	2	3	4	Total
49ers	7	3	0	0	**10**
**Packers**	7	13	3	7	**30**

at City Stadium, Green Bay, Wisconsin

- Date: September 24
- Game time: 1:00 p.m. CDT
- Game weather: 50 °F (10 °C), relative humidity 90%, wind 17 mph
- Game attendance: 38,669
- Referee: George Rennix
- TV: CBS
- Box Score

Game information

49ers

Packers

Scoring summary

Quarter	Time	Drive			Team	Scoring information	Score	
Quarter	Time	Plays	Yards	TOP	Team	Scoring information	SF	GB
1					GB	Hornung 1-yard touchdown run, Hornung kick good	0	7
1					SF	Lockett 1-yard touchdown run, Davis kick good	7	7
2		—	—	—	GB	Wood 39-yard punt return for a touchdown, Hornung kick good	7	14
2					GB	13-yard field goal by Hornung	7	17
2					SF	46-yard field goal by Davis	10	17
2					GB	15-yard field goal by Hornung	10	20
3					GB	43-yard field goal by Hornung	10	23
4					GB	McGee 21-yard touchdown reception from Starr, Hornung kick good	10	30
"TOP" = time of possession. For other American football terms, see Glossary of American football.							10	30

==== Week 3: vs. Chicago ====
Week 3: Chicago Bears at Green Bay Packers

Quarter	1	2	3	4	Total
Bears	0	0	0	0	**0**
**Packers**	7	3	7	7	**24**

at City Stadium, Green Bay, Wisconsin

- Date: October 1
- Game time: 1:00 p.m. CDT
- Game weather: 46 °F (8 °C), relative humidity 76%, wind 19 mph
- Game attendance: 38,669
- Referee: John Pace
- TV: CBS
- Box Score

Game information

Bears

Packers

Scoring summary

Quarter	Time	Drive			Team	Scoring information	Score	
Quarter	Time	Plays	Yards	TOP	Team	Scoring information	CHI	GB
1	0:35				GB	Dowler 18-yard touchdown reception from Starr, Hornung kick good	0	7
2	10:31				GB	37-yard field goal by Hornung	0	10
3	8:37				GB	Taylor 3-yard touchdown run, Hornung kick good	0	17
4	13:40				GB	Kramer 17-yard touchdown reception from Starr, Hornung kick good	0	24
"TOP" = time of possession. For other American football terms, see Glossary of American football.							0	24

==== Week 4: vs. Baltimore ====
Week 4: Baltimore Colts at Green Bay Packers

Quarter	1	2	3	4	Total
Colts	0	7	0	0	**7**
**Packers**	7	10	14	14	**45**

at City Stadium, Green Bay, Wisconsin

- Date: October 8
- Game time: 1:00 p.m. CDT
- Game weather: 60 °F (16 °C), relative humidity 71%, wind 11 mph
- Game attendance: 38,669
- Referee: Bill Downes
- TV: CBS
- Box Score

Game information

Colts

Packers

Scoring summary

Quarter	Time	Drive			Team	Scoring information	Score	
Quarter	Time	Plays	Yards	TOP	Team	Scoring information	BAL	GB
1	12:56				GB	Hornung 54-yard touchdown run, Hornung kick good	0	7
2	8:37				BAL	Moore 1-yard touchdown run, Myhra kick good	7	7
2					GB	38-yard field goal by Hornung	7	10
2	5:14				GB	Hornung 1-yard touchdown run, Hornung kick good	7	17
3	12:12				GB	Hornung 8-yard touchdown reception from Starr, Hornung kick good	7	24
3	2:06				GB	Hornung 1-yard touchdown run, Hornung kick good	7	31
4	13:45	—	—	—	GB	Wood 72-yard punt return for a touchdown, Hornung kick good	7	38
4	10:58				GB	Taylor 3-yard touchdown run, Hornung kick good	7	45
"TOP" = time of possession. For other American football terms, see Glossary of American football.							7	45

==== Week 5: at Cleveland ====
Week 5: Green Bay Packers at Cleveland Browns

Quarter	1	2	3	4	Total
**Packers**	14	7	7	21	**49**
Browns	0	3	7	7	**17**

at Cleveland Stadium, Cleveland, Ohio

- Date: October 15
- Game time: 1:00 p.m. CDT
- Game weather: 44 °F (7 °C), relative humidity 62%, wind 16 mph
- Game attendance: 75,042
- Referee: Ron Gibbs
- TV: CBS
- Box Score

Game information

Packers

Browns

Scoring summary

Quarter	Time	Drive			Team	Scoring information	Score	
Quarter	Time	Plays	Yards	TOP	Team	Scoring information	GB	CLE
1	8:15				GB	Taylor 25-yard touchdown run, Hornung kick good	7	0
1	0:43				GB	Taylor 1-yard touchdown run, Hornung kick good	14	0
2	10:10				CLE	27-yard field goal by Groza	14	3
2	6:58				GB	Hornung 3-yard touchdown run, Hornung kick good	21	3
3	11:30				GB	Taylor 45-yard touchdown run, Hornung kick good	28	3
3	6:14				CLE	Nagler 21-yard touchdown reception from Plum, Groza kick good	28	10
4	14:56				GB	Taylor 4-yard touchdown run, Hornung kick good	35	10
4	9:58				CLE	Renfro 13-yard touchdown reception from Plum, Groza kick good	35	17
4	6:48				GB	McGee 45-yard touchdown reception from Starr, Hornung kick good	42	17
4	1:55				GB	Roach 1-yard touchdown run, Hornung kick good	49	17
"TOP" = time of possession. For other American football terms, see Glossary of American football.							49	17

==== Week 6: at Minnesota ====
Week 6: Green Bay Packers at Minnesota Vikings

Quarter	1	2	3	4	Total
**Packers**	10	3	3	17	**33**
Vikings	0	7	0	0	**7**

at Metropolitan Stadium, Minneapolis, Minnesota

- Date: October 22
- Game time: 1:30 p.m. CDT
- Game weather: 48 °F (9 °C), relative humidity 82%, wind 13 mph
- Game attendance: 42,117
- Referee: John Pace
- TV: CBS
- Box Score

Game information

Packers

Vikings

Scoring summary

Quarter	Time	Drive			Team	Scoring information	Score	
Quarter	Time	Plays	Yards	TOP	Team	Scoring information	GB	MIN
1	10:49				GB	Dowler 78-yard touchdown reception from Starr, Hornung kick good	7	0
1	4:58				GB	14-yard field goal by Hornung	10	0
2	10:09				MIN	Tarkenton 1-yard touchdown run, Mercer kick good	10	7
2	2:02				GB	18-yard field goal by Hornung	13	7
3	9:36				GB	13-yard field goal by Hornung	16	7
4	12:08				GB	16-yard field goal by Hornung	19	7
4	9:13				GB	Taylor 3-yard touchdown run, Hornung kick good	26	7
4	3:54	—	—	—	GB	Interception returned 21 yards for touchdown by Currie, Hornung kick good	33	7
"TOP" = time of possession. For other American football terms, see Glossary of American football.							33	7

==== Week 7: vs. Minnesota ====
Week 7: Minnesota Vikings at Green Bay Packers

Quarter	1	2	3	4	Total
Vikings	0	7	3	0	**10**
**Packers**	14	7	0	7	**28**

at Milwaukee County Stadium, Milwaukee, Wisconsin

- Date: October 29
- Game time: 1:00 p.m. CST
- Game weather: 57 °F (14 °C), relative humidity 87%, wind 16 mph
- Game attendance: 44,116
- TV: CBS
- Box Score

Game information

Vikings

Packers

Scoring summary

Quarter	Time	Drive			Team	Scoring information	Score	
Quarter	Time	Plays	Yards	TOP	Team	Scoring information	MIN	GB
1					GB	Hornung 1-yard touchdown run, Hornung kick good	0	7
1					GB	Kramer 10-yard touchdown reception from Hornung, Hornung kick good	0	14
1					GB	Taylor 8-yard touchdown reception from Starr, Hornung kick good	0	21
2					MIN	Reichow 8-yard touchdown reception from Shaw, Mercer kick good	7	21
3					MIN	13-yard field goal by Mercer	10	21
4					GB	McGee 23-yard touchdown reception from Starr, Hornung kick good	10	28
"TOP" = time of possession. For other American football terms, see Glossary of American football.							10	28

==== Week 8: at Baltimore ====
Week 8: Green Bay Packers at Baltimore Colts

Quarter	1	2	3	4	Total
Packers	7	7	0	7	**21**
**Colts**	7	14	10	14	**45**

at Memorial Stadium, Baltimore, Maryland

- Date: November 5
- Game time: 1:00 p.m. CST
- Game weather: 69 °F (21 °C), relative humidity 78%, wind 11 mph
- Game attendance: 57,641
- Referee: Ron Gibbs
- TV: CBS
- Box Score

Game information

Packers

Colts

Scoring summary

Quarter	Time	Drive			Team	Scoring information	Score	
Quarter	Time	Plays	Yards	TOP	Team	Scoring information	GB	BAL
1					BAL	Perry 2-yard touchdown run, Myhra kick good	0	7
1					GB	Starr 21-yard touchdown run, Hornung kick good	7	7
2					BAL	Hawkins 4-yard touchdown reception from Unitas, Myhra kick good	7	14
2					GB	Hornung 17-yard touchdown run, Hornung kick good	14	14
2					BAL	Moore 38-yard touchdown reception from Unitas, Myhra kick good	14	21
3					BAL	12-yard field goal by Myhra	14	24
3					BAL	Orr 19-yard touchdown reception from Unitas, Myhra kick good	14	31
4					BAL	Orr 4-yard touchdown reception from Unitas, Myhra kick good	14	38
4					BAL	Perry 15-yard touchdown run, Myhra kick good	14	45
4		—	—	—	GB	Interception returned 41 yards for touchdown by Whittenton, Hornung kick good	21	45
"TOP" = time of possession. For other American football terms, see Glossary of American football.							21	45

==== Week 9: at Chicago ====
Week 9: Green Bay Packers at Chicago Bears

Quarter	1	2	3	4	Total
**Packers**	7	21	3	0	**31**
Bears	7	0	7	14	**28**

at Wrigley Field, Chicago, Illinois

- Date: November 12
- Game time: 1:00 p.m. CST
- Game weather: 52 °F (11 °C), relative humidity 78%, wind 13 mph
- Game attendance: 49,711
- Referee: Bud Brubaker
- TV: CBS
- Box Score

Game information

Packers

Bears

Scoring summary

Quarter	Time	Drive			Team	Scoring information	Score	
Quarter	Time	Plays	Yards	TOP	Team	Scoring information	GB	CHI
1					CHI	Ditka 47-yard touchdown reception from Wade, LeClerc kick good	0	7
1					GB	Kramer 53-yard touchdown reception from Starr, Hornung kick good	7	7
2					GB	Kramer 8-yard touchdown reception from Starr, Hornung kick good	14	7
2					GB	Hornung 8-yard touchdown run, Hornung kick good	21	7
2					GB	Hornung 34-yard touchdown reception from Starr, Hornung kick good	28	7
3					GB	51-yard field goal by Hornung	31	7
3					CHI	Ditka 15-yard touchdown reception from Wade, LeClerc kick good	31	14
4					CHI	Ditka 29-yard touchdown reception from Wade, LeClerc kick good	31	21
4					CHI	Casares 9-yard touchdown run, LeClerc kick good	31	28
"TOP" = time of possession. For other American football terms, see Glossary of American football.							31	28

==== Week 10: vs. Los Angeles ====
Week 10: Los Angeles Rams at Green Bay Packers

Quarter	1	2	3	4	Total
Rams	7	3	0	7	**17**
**Packers**	0	28	0	7	**35**

at City Stadium, Green Bay, Wisconsin

- Date: November 19
- Game time: 1:00 p.m. CST
- Game weather: 26 °F (−3 °C), relative humidity 81%, wind 5 mph, wind chill 20 °F (−7 °C)
- Game attendance: 38,669
- Referee: George Rennix
- TV: CBS
- Box Score

Game information

Rams

Packers

Scoring summary

Quarter	Time	Drive			Team	Scoring information	Score	
Quarter	Time	Plays	Yards	TOP	Team	Scoring information	LA	GB
1					LA	Arnett 14-yard touchdown run, Villanueva kick good	7	0
2					GB	Taylor 1-yard touchdown run, Agajanian kick good	7	7
2					GB	McGee 20-yard touchdown reception from Starr, Agajanian kick good	7	14
2					GB	McGee 13-yard touchdown reception from Starr, Agajanian kick good	7	21
2					LA	17-yard field goal by Villanueva	10	21
2					GB	Dowler 17-yard touchdown reception from Starr, Agajanian kick good	10	28
4					LA	Matson 17-yard touchdown reception from Ryan, Villanueva kick good	17	28
4					GB	Taylor 1-yard touchdown run, Agajanian kick good	17	35
"TOP" = time of possession. For other American football terms, see Glossary of American football.							17	35

==== Week 11: at Detroit ====
Week 11: Green Bay Packers at Detroit Lions

Quarter	1	2	3	4	Total
**Packers**	0	7	0	10	**17**
Lions	3	3	3	0	**9**

at Tiger Stadium, Detroit, Michigan

- Date: November 23
- Game time: 11:00 a.m. CST
- Game weather: 43 °F (6 °C), relative humidity 97%, wind 8 mph
- Game attendance: 55,662
- Referee: Bill Downes
- TV: CBS
- Box Score

Game information

Packers

Lions

Scoring summary

Quarter	Time	Drive			Team	Scoring information	Score	
Quarter	Time	Plays	Yards	TOP	Team	Scoring information	GB	DET
1					DET	13-yard field goal by Martin	0	3
2					DET	34-yard field goal by Martin	0	6
2					GB	Taylor 1-yard touchdown run, Hornung kick good	7	6
3					DET	16-yard field goal by Martin	7	9
4					GB	Taylor 1-yard touchdown run, Hornung kick good	14	9
4					GB	9-yard field goal by Hornung	17	9
"TOP" = time of possession. For other American football terms, see Glossary of American football.							17	9

==== Week 12: vs. New York ====
Week 12: New York Giants at Green Bay Packers

Quarter	1	2	3	4	Total
Giants	7	10	0	0	**17**
**Packers**	13	0	0	7	**20**

at Milwaukee County Stadium, Milwaukee, Wisconsin

- Date: December 3
- Game time: 1:00 p.m. CST
- Game weather: 57 °F (14 °C), relative humidity 87%, wind 16 mph
- Game attendance: 47,012
- TV: CBS
- Box Score

Game information

Giants

Packers

Scoring summary

Quarter	Time	Drive			Team	Scoring information	Score	
Quarter	Time	Plays	Yards	TOP	Team	Scoring information	NY	GB
1					GB	23-yard field goal by Hornung	0	3
1					NY	Tittle 1-yard touchdown run, Summerall kick good	7	3
1					GB	25-yard field goal by Hornung	7	6
1					GB	Taylor 14-yard touchdown run, Hornung kick good	7	13
2					NY	Gaiters 1-yard touchdown run, Summerall kick good	14	13
2					NY	41-yard field goal by Summerall	17	13
4					GB	Taylor 3-yard touchdown run, Hornung kick good	17	20
"TOP" = time of possession. For other American football terms, see Glossary of American football.							17	20

==== Week 13: at San Francisco ====
Week 13: Green Bay Packers at San Francisco 49ers

Quarter	1	2	3	4	Total
Packers	0	7	7	7	**21**
**49ers**	0	14	2	6	**22**

at Kezar Stadium, San Francisco, California

- Date: December 10
- Game time: 3:30 p.m. CST
- Game weather: 48 °F (9 °C), relative humidity 72%, wind 12 mph
- Game attendance: 55,722
- Referee: Emil Heintz
- TV: CBS
- Box Score

Game information

Packers

49ers

Scoring summary

Quarter	Time	Drive			Team	Scoring information	Score	
Quarter	Time	Plays	Yards	TOP	Team	Scoring information	GB	SF
2	9:14				SF	Casey 51-yard touchdown reception from Brodie, Davis kick good	0	7
2	5:02				SF	Owens 10-yard touchdown reception from Brodie, Davis kick good	0	14
2	2:11				GB	McGee 22-yard touchdown reception from Starr, Hornung kick good	7	14
3	13:57	—	—	—	GB	Starr tackled in the end zone by Krueger for a safety	7	16
3	0:32				GB	McGee 12-yard touchdown reception from Starr, Hornung kick good	14	16
4	6:53				SF	40-yard field goal by Davis	14	19
4	2:12				GB	Taylor 40-yard touchdown run, Hornung kick good	21	19
4	0:11				SF	14-yard field goal by Davis	21	22
"TOP" = time of possession. For other American football terms, see Glossary of American football.							21	22

==== Week 14: at Los Angeles ====
Week 14: Green Bay Packers at Los Angeles Rams

Quarter	1	2	3	4	Total
**Packers**	7	7	0	10	**24**
Rams	0	3	7	7	**17**

at Los Angeles Memorial Coliseum, Los Angeles, California

- Date: December 17
- Game time: 3:30 p.m. CST
- Game weather: 52 °F (11 °C), relative humidity 78%, wind 8 mph
- Game attendance: 49,169
- TV: CBS
- Box Score

Game information

Packers

Rams

Scoring summary

Quarter	Time	Drive			Team	Scoring information	Score	
Quarter	Time	Plays	Yards	TOP	Team	Scoring information	GB	LA
1					GB	Moore 1-yard touchdown run, Agajanian kick good	7	0
2					LA	17-yard field goal by Villanueva	7	3
2					GB	Moore 8-yard touchdown reception from Starr, Agajanian kick good	14	3
3					LA	Bass 55-yard touchdown run, Villanueva kick good	14	10
4		—	—	—	LA	Bass 90-yard punt return for a touchdown, Villanueva kick good	14	17
4					GB	28-yard field goal by Agajanian	17	17
4					GB	Pitts 17-yard touchdown run, Agajanian kick good	24	17
"TOP" = time of possession. For other American football terms, see Glossary of American football.							24	17

== Playoffs ==
Round	Date	Opponent	Result	Record	Venue	Recap
NFL Championship	December 31	New York Giants	W 37–0	1–0	City Stadium	Recap

=== Game summary ===
==== 1961 NFL Championship Game vs. New York ====
1961 NFL Championship Game: New York Giants at Green Bay Packers

Quarter	1	2	3	4	Total
Giants	0	0	0	0	0
Packers	0	24	10	3	37

at City Stadium, Green Bay, Wisconsin

- Date: December 31
- Game time: 1:00 p.m. CST
- Game weather: 17 °F (−8 °C), relative humidity 82%, wind 10 mph, wind chill 6 °F (−14 °C)
- Game attendance: 39,029
- TV: NBC
- Box Score

Team	Category	Player	Statistics
NY	Passing		
NY	Rushing		
NY	Receiving		
GB	Passing		
GB	Rushing		
GB	Receiving		

Scoring summary

Quarter	Time	Drive			Team	Scoring information	Score	
Quarter	Time	Plays	Yards	TOP	Team	Scoring information	NY	GB
2					GB	Hornung 6-yard touchdown run, Hornung kick good	0	7
2					GB	Dowler 13-yard touchdown reception from Starr, Hornung kick good	0	14
2					GB	Ron Kramer 14-yard touchdown reception from Starr, Hornung kick good	0	21
2					GB	17-yard field goal by Hornung	0	24
3					GB	22-yard field goal by Hornung	0	27
3					GB	Ron Kramer 13-yard touchdown reception from Starr, Hornung kick good	0	34
4					GB	19-yard field goal by Hornung	0	37
"TOP" = time of possession. For other American football terms, see Glossary of American football.							0	37

== Standings ==
NFL Western Conference
	W	L	T	PCT	CONF	PF	PA	STK
Green Bay Packers	11	3	0	.786	9–3	391	223	W1
Detroit Lions	8	5	1	.615	7–4–1	270	258	L1
Chicago Bears	8	6	0	.571	7–5	326	302	W2
Baltimore Colts	8	6	0	.571	6–6	302	307	W1
San Francisco 49ers	7	6	1	.538	6–5–1	346	272	L1
Los Angeles Rams	4	10	0	.286	3–9	263	333	L1
Minnesota Vikings	3	11	0	.214	3–9	285	407	L2

Note: Tie games were not officially counted in the standings until 1972.

== Stats ==
Passing

Rushing

Receiving

Kicking

Punting

Kick Return

Punt Return

Interception

Team

Total yards and turnovers	Passing	Rushing

== Awards and records ==
- Paul Hornung, NFL MVP
- Paul Hornung, Bert Bell Award
