= Ben Agajanian =

American football player (1919–2018)

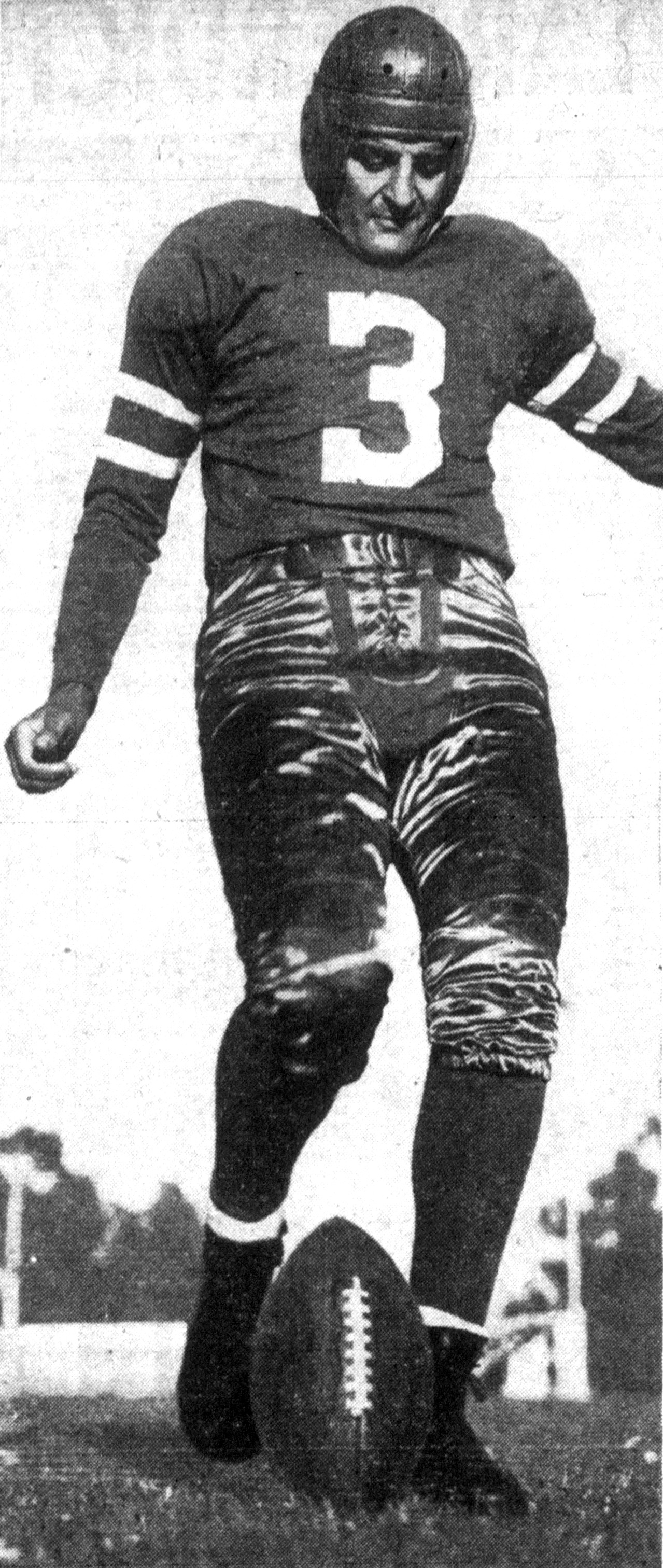
- Agajanian, circa 1947

No. 15, 12, 27, 24, 25, 89, 43, 3, 41, 8
- Position: Placekicker

Personal information
- Born: August 28, 1919; Santa Ana, California, U.S.
- Died: February 8, 2018 (aged 98); Cathedral City, California, U.S.
- Listed height: 6 ft 0 in (1.83 m)
- Listed weight: 215 lb (98 kg)

Career information
- High school: San Pedro (San Pedro, California)
- College: New Mexico (1940–1941)
- NFL draft: 1941: undrafted

Career history
- Hollywood Bears (1942); San Diego Bombers (1943); Hollywood Rangers (1944); Philadelphia Eagles (1945); Pittsburgh Steelers (1945); Hollywood Bears (1946); Los Angeles Dons (1947–1948); New York Giants (1949); Los Angeles Rams (1953); New York Giants (1954–1957); Los Angeles Chargers (1960); Dallas Texans (1961); Green Bay Packers (1961); Oakland Raiders (1962); San Diego Chargers (1964)

Awards and highlights
- 2× NFL champion (1956, 1961)

Career NFL/AFL/AAFC statistics
- Field goals made: 104
- Field goal attempts: 204
- Field goal %: 51
- Longest field goal: 51
- Stats at Pro Football Reference

Benjamin James Agajanian (August 28, 1919 – February 8, 2018), nicknamed "the Toeless Wonder", was an American football player, primarily a placekicker in the National Football League (NFL), All-America Football Conference (AAFC) and American Football League (AFL).

== Early life ==
Born in Santa Ana, California, he graduated from San Pedro High School in the San Pedro community in Los Angeles. A placekicker, he played college football at Compton Junior College and the University of New Mexico in Albuquerque.

In 1939, during his time at college, four of the toes on Agajanian's kicking foot were crushed in workplace accident, and doctors amputated them.

He served in the U.S. Army Air Forces during World War II as a physical training instructor.

== Pro football career ==
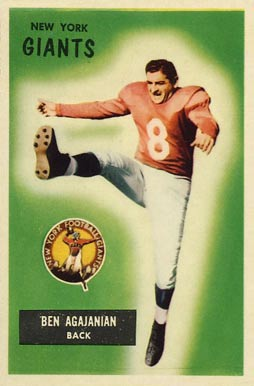
1955 Bowman football card

Agajanian played professionally in the National Football League from 1945 through 1959, then in the newly formed American Football League for the Los Angeles/San Diego Chargers in 1960 and 1964. He also played for the Dallas Texans in 1961 and the Oakland Raiders in 1962. He is one of two players (the other was Hardy Brown) who played in the All-America Football Conference, the American Football League, and the National Football League.

He was pro football's third kicking specialist (after Jack Manders and Mose Kelsch), booting field goals for 10 different professional teams in the 1940s, 1950s and 1960s, including two NFL champions: the New York Giants in 1956 and the Green Bay Packers in 1961. In the 1956 title game, he went 5-for-6 on extra points and 2-for-3 on field goals, while in the 1960 title game he was perfect on extra points (one) and field goals (three).

During Agajanian's time with the Packers, he was mistakenly assigned the number 3; the number had been retired for Tony Canadeo nine years earlier. Agajanian remains the last Packer to wear number 3.

He led the league in field goal attempts in 1947 (24) and 1954 (25) and also led in made field goals (15) in the former.

== Later life ==
After retiring from the field at age 45, he was the Dallas Cowboys kicking coach for 20 years. He also coached Chicago Bears kicker Mac Percival for the 1968 season.

Agajanian died in Cathedral City, California, on February 8, 2018, at age 98. His older brother was auto racing promoter J. C. Agajanian.

== See also ==
- List of NFL players by most teams played for
- History of the New York Giants (1925–78)
- List of American Football League players
- History of the Armenian Americans in Los Angeles
