= 1961 NFL season =

American football season

Regular season
- Duration: September 17 – December 31, 1961
- East Champions: New York Giants
- West Champions: Green Bay Packers

Championship Game
- Champions: Green Bay Packers

NFL teams: West, East

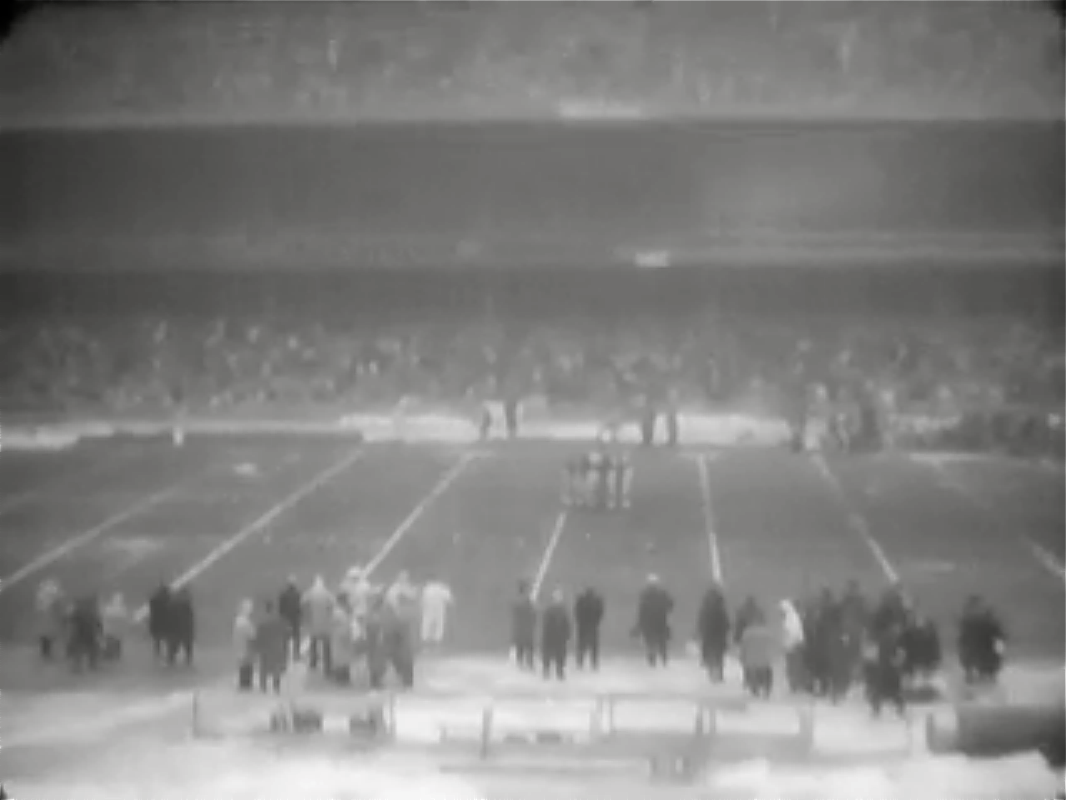
Yankee Stadium during a New York Giants - Cleveland Browns game in 1961.

The 1961 NFL season was the 42nd regular season of the National Football League (NFL). The league expanded to 14 teams with the addition of the Minnesota Vikings, after the team's founders declined to be charter members of the new American Football League. The schedule was also expanded from 12 games per team to 14 games per team where it would stay for 17 years. The Vikings were placed in the Western Division, and the Dallas Cowboys were switched from the Western Division to the Eastern Division. The addition of the Vikings returned the NFL to an even number of teams (and eliminated the bye week of 1960 until 1966 temporarily and 1990 on a permanent basis).

The season ended when the Green Bay Packers shut out the New York Giants 37–0 in the NFL Championship Game.

== Draft ==
The 1961 NFL draft was held from December 27–28, 1960 at Philadelphia's Warwick Hotel. With the first pick, the Minnesota Vikings selected halfback Tommy Mason from Tulane University.

== Expansion draft ==
The 1961 NFL expansion draft was held on January 26, 1961, with the Minnesota Vikings selecting 36 players from the other NFL teams. The one-year old Dallas Cowboys were exempted from losing a player in this expansion draft.

== Division races ==
The new Minnesota Vikings won their first game when they upset the Chicago Bears team, 37–13, on September 17, 1961. Mike Mercer made the Vikings' first points on a 12-yard field goal, and Fran Tarkenton guided the team to five touchdowns. The Vikings finished at 3–11 after that good start. With 14 teams in two divisions, each NFL team now played a 14-game schedule: a home-and-away series with the other six teams in their division, and two interdivision games.

In Week Five, the Giants and Eagles led the Eastern Division, and the Packers and 49ers led the Western, all with records of 4–1. The following week, the 49ers lost to the Bears, 31–0, while Green Bay beat Minnesota 33–7. The Giants and Eagles, both winners, remained tied in the Eastern standings at 5–1. In Week Seven, Dallas edged the Giants 17–16, while the Eagles beat the Redskins 27–24 on Sonny Jurgensen's last-quarter touchdown pass to Tommy McDonald. In Week Nine (November 12), the Giants beat the Eagles, 38–21, to give both teams 7–2 records, while Green Bay survived a game at Chicago, 31–28, that would otherwise have tied both teams at 6–3; Green Bay led the Western race the rest of the way. In Week Ten, New York's 42–21 win over Pittsburgh put it at 8–2, while Cleveland's 45–24 win over Philadelphia put both those teams at 7–3. In Week 11 (December 3), New York lost 20–17 to Green Bay, while the Eagles won 35–24 at Pittsburgh, tying the race again.

The Giants and Eagles, both at 9–3, met the following week in Philadelphia (December 10). After New York trailed 10–7, Coach Allie Sherman replaced Y. A. Tittle with Charlie Conerly, who at 40 was the NFL's oldest player. Conerly threw for three touchdowns for the 28–24 win. The winning score came after the Eagles were penalized for roughing the kicker on the Giants' fourth down, giving the Giants first down on the 24. At season's end (December 17), the Eagles rallied to beat Detroit 27–24, and hoped for a Giants' loss to force a playoff. At that moment, New York and Cleveland were tied 7–7 with two minutes left. A long punt by the Giants' Don Chandler pinned the Browns on their own 7-yard line, and ended any threat of a loss.

Week	Western		Eastern	
1	4 teams (Bal, Det, Min, SF)	1–0–0	3 teams (Dal, Phi, St.L)	1–0–0
2	Detroit Lions	2–0–0	Tie (Dal, Phi)	2–0–0
3	4 teams (Bal, Det, GB, SF)	2–1–0	5 teams (Cle, Dal, NYG, Phi, StL)	2–1–0
4	Tie (GB, SF)	3–1–0	4 teams (Cle, Dal, NYG, Phi)	3–1–0
5	Tie (GB, SF)	4–1–0	Tie (NYG, Phi)	4–1–0
6	Green Bay Packers	5–1–0	Tie (NYG, Phi)	5–1–0
7	Green Bay Packers	6–1–0	Philadelphia Eagles	6–1–0
8	Green Bay Packers	6–2–0	Philadelphia Eagles	7–1–0
9	Green Bay Packers	7–2–0	Tie (NYG, Phi)	7–2–0
10	Green Bay Packers	8–2–0	New York Giants	8–2–0
11	Green Bay Packers	9–2–0	New York Giants	9–2–0
12	Green Bay Packers	10–2–0	Tie (NYG, Phi)	9–3–0
13	Green Bay Packers	10–3–0	New York Giants	10–3–0
14	Green Bay Packers	11–3–0	New York Giants	10–3–1

== Final standings ==
NFL Eastern Conference
	W	L	T	PCT	CONF	PF	PA	STK
New York Giants	10	3	1	.769	9–2–1	368	220	T1
Philadelphia Eagles	10	4	0	.714	8–4	361	297	W1
Cleveland Browns	8	5	1	.615	8–3–1	319	270	T1
St. Louis Cardinals	7	7	0	.500	7–5	279	267	W3
Pittsburgh Steelers	6	8	0	.429	5–7	295	287	L1
Dallas Cowboys	4	9	1	.308	2–9–1	236	380	L4
Washington Redskins	1	12	1	.077	1–10–1	174	392	W1

Note: Tie games were not officially counted in the standings until 1972.

NFL Western Conference
	W	L	T	PCT	CONF	PF	PA	STK
Green Bay Packers	11	3	0	.786	9–3	391	223	W1
Detroit Lions	8	5	1	.615	7–4–1	270	258	L1
Chicago Bears	8	6	0	.571	7–5	326	302	W2
Baltimore Colts	8	6	0	.571	6–6	302	307	W1
San Francisco 49ers	7	6	1	.538	6–5–1	346	272	L1
Los Angeles Rams	4	10	0	.286	3–9	263	333	L1
Minnesota Vikings	3	11	0	.214	3–9	285	407	L2

== Postseason ==
=== NFL Championship Game ===
Green Bay 37, New York 0 at City Stadium, Green Bay, Wisconsin, December 31, 1961

=== Playoff Bowl ===
The Playoff Bowl was between the division runners-up, for third place in the league. This was its second year, and it was played a week after the title game.

- Detroit 38, Philadelphia 10 at Orange Bowl, Miami, Florida, January 6, 1962

== Awards ==
Most valuable player

- Associated Press – Paul Hornung, halfback, Green Bay Packers
- Newspaper Enterprise Association – Y. A. Tittle, quarterback, New York Giants
- United Press International – Paul Hornung, halfback, Green Bay Packers

Rookie of the year

- Associated Press – Mike Ditka, tight end, Chicago Bears
- United Press International – Mike Ditka, tight end, Chicago Bears

Coach of the year

- Associated Press – Allie Sherman, New York Giants
- United Press International – Allie Sherman, New York Giants

Other

- 1961 All-Pro Team
- 1962 Pro Bowl

== Coaching changes ==
=== Offseason ===
- Minnesota Vikings: Norm Van Brocklin became the expansion team's first head coach.
- New York Giants: Jim Lee Howell was replaced by Allie Sherman.
- Philadelphia Eagles: Buck Shaw was replaced by Nick Skorich.
- Washington Redskins: Mike Nixon was replaced by Bill McPeak.

=== In-season ===
- St. Louis Cardinals: Pop Ivy resigned after 12 games. Chuck Drulis, Ray Prochaska, and Ray Willsey served as co-head coaches for the final two games of the season.

== Stadium changes ==
- Briggs Stadium, the home of the Detroit Lions, was renamed Tiger Stadium
- The expansion Minnesota Vikings began play at Metropolitan Stadium in Bloomington
- The Washington Redskins moved from Griffith Stadium to D.C. Stadium

== See also ==
- 1961 American Football League season
