= 1961 San Francisco 49ers season =

American football team season

- Owner: Victor Morabito
- General manager: Louis Spadia
- Head coach: Howard Hickey
- Home stadium: Kezar Stadium

Results
- Record: 7–6–1
- Division place: 5th NFL Western
- Playoffs: Did not qualify

The 1961 San Francisco 49ers season was the franchise's 12th season in the National Football League, their 16th overall, and their second season under head coach Red Hickey.

The 49ers attempted to improve on their 7–5 season from the previous season, and make the playoffs for the first time since 1957. However, despite starting the season 4–1, they would lose 5 of their last 8 games, finishing their season 7–6–1, and they missed the playoffs for the 4th straight year.

== Offseason ==
=== NFL draft ===
1961 San Francisco 49ers draft
Round	Pick	Player	Position	College	Notes
1	6	Jimmy Johnson * ^{†}	DB	UCLA	
1	9	Bernie Casey *	HB	Bowling Green	
1	11	Billy Kilmer *	QB	UCLA	
2	24	Roland Lakes	DT	Wichita	
3	37	Bill Cooper	FB	Muskingum	
4	47	Aaron Thomas *	TE	Oregon State	
4	52	Dale Messer	HB	Fresno State	
5	58	Clark Miller	DE	Utah State	Later played with 49ers from 1962–68
5	65	Bob McCreary	T	Wake Forest	
6	80	Mike McClellan	DB	Oklahoma	
7	93	Ray Purdin	B	Northwestern	signed by Saskatchewan Roughriders (CFL)
8	108	Neill Plumley	T	Oregon	
9	118	Leon Donohue	G	San Jose State	Later played with the 49ers from 1962–64
9	121	Evaristo Nino	T	East Texas State	
10	136	Paul Hynes	DB	Louisiana Tech	signed with Dallas Texans (AFL)
11	149	Tony Parrilli	G	Illinois	
12	164	Don Coffey	WR	Memphis State	
13	174	Tommy Hackler	E	Tennessee Tech	
13	177	Julius Fincke	T	McNeese State	
14	192	Bill Worrell	T	Georgia	
15	205	Bob Sams	T	Central State (OK)	
16	220	Charley Fuller	HB	San Francisco State	signed by Oakland Raiders (AFL)
17	233	Tom Jewell	T	Idaho State	
18	248	Kay McFarland	WR	Colorado State	Played the 1961 season with CSU
19	261	Tom Simpson	T	Davidson	
20	276	Jerry Perry	G	Central State (OK)	
Made roster † Pro Football Hall of Fame * Made at least one Pro Bowl during career

== Preseason ==
Week	Date	Opponent	Result	Record	Venue	Attendance
1	August 12	vs. New York Giants	L 20–21	0–1	Multnomah Stadium	24,084
2	August 21	Cleveland Browns	L 24–27	0–2	Kezar Stadium	38,759
3	August 26	Minnesota Vikings	W 14–10	1–2	Multnomah Stadium	27,044
4	September 1	at Los Angeles Rams	W 38–20	2–2	Los Angeles Memorial Coliseum	42,558
5	September 9	vs. Dallas Cowboys	W 24–7	3–2	Hughes Stadium	22,130

== Regular season ==
=== Schedule ===
Game	Date	Opponent	Result	Record	Venue	Attendance	Sources
1	September 17	Washington Redskins	**W** 35–3	1–0	Kezar Stadium	43,412	Recap
2	September 24	at **Green Bay Packers**	**L** 10–30	1–1	New City Stadium	38,624	Recap
3	October 1	at **Detroit Lions**	**W** 49–0	2–1	Tiger Stadium	53,155	Recap
4	October 8	**Los Angeles Rams**	**W** 35–0	3–1	Kezar Stadium	59,004	Recap
5	October 15	at Minnesota Vikings	**W** 38–24	4–1	Metropolitan Stadium	34,415	Recap
6	October 22	at **Chicago Bears**	**L** 0–31	4–2	Wrigley Field	49,070	Recap
7	October 29	at Pittsburgh Steelers	**L** 10–20	4–3	Forbes Field	19,686	Recap
8	November 5	**Detroit Lions**	**T** 20–20	4–3–1	Kezar Stadium	56,878	Recap
9	November 12	at **Los Angeles Rams**	**L** 7–17	4–4–1	L.A. Memorial Coliseum	63,766	Recap
10	November 19	**Chicago Bears**	**W** 41–31	5–4–1	Kezar Stadium	52,972	Recap
11	November 26	**Minnesota Vikings**	**W** 38–28	6–4–1	Kezar Stadium	48,905	Recap
12	December 3	at **Baltimore Colts**	**L** 17–20	6–5–1	Memorial Stadium	57,641	Recap
13	December 10	**Green Bay Packers**	**W** 22–21	7–5–1	Kezar Stadium	55,722	Recap
14	December 16	**Baltimore Colts**	**L** 27–24	7–6–1	Kezar Stadium	45,517	Recap
Note: Intra-conference opponents are in **bold** text.

== Standings ==
Program for the November 5 game against the visiting Detroit Lions.

NFL Western Conference
	W	L	T	PCT	CONF	PF	PA	STK
Green Bay Packers	11	3	0	.786	9–3	391	223	W1
Detroit Lions	8	5	1	.615	7–4–1	270	258	L1
Chicago Bears	8	6	0	.571	7–5	326	302	W2
Baltimore Colts	8	6	0	.571	6–6	302	307	W1
San Francisco 49ers	7	6	1	.538	6–5–1	346	272	L1
Los Angeles Rams	4	10	0	.286	3–9	263	333	L1
Minnesota Vikings	3	11	0	.214	3–9	285	407	L2

Note: Tie games were not officially counted in the standings until 1972.

== Personnel ==
=== Staff / Coaches ===
1961 San Francisco 49ers staff
Front office: Team Owner - Victor Morabito; General manager – Louis Spadia; Head coaches: Head coach - Red Hickey; Offensive coaches: Chief of Offense / Offensive Coordinator - Bill Johnson; Offensive Ends / Assistant Coach – Billy Wilson	Defensive coaches: Defensive Assistant / Defensive Backs – Mark Duncan; Defensive Backfield / Secondary – Jack Christiansen; Special teams coaches: None - N/A

=== Roster ===
1961 San Francisco 49ers roster
Quarterbacks (QB): 12 John Brodie; 17 Billy Kilmer RB; 11 Bob Waters; Running backs (RB): 34 Bill Cooper; 35 Don McIlhenny; 23 Ray Norton; 32 C. R. Roberts; 24 J. D. Smith; Wide receivers (WR): 27 R. C. Owens; 89 Aaron Thomas; Tight ends (TE): 30 Bernie Casey; 85 Monty Stickles	Offensive linemen (OL): 77 Bruce Bosley G; 64 Ted Connolly G; 57 Bill Lopasky G; 53 Frank Morze C; 76 Len Rohde T; 79 Bob St. Clair T; 78 John Thomas T; Defensive linemen (DL): 63 Monte Clark DT; 86 Dan Colchico DE; 74 Lou Cordileone DT; 70 Charlie Krueger DE; 60 Roland Lakes DE; 73 Leo Nomellini DT	Linebackers (LB): 83 Gorden Kelley OLB; 54 Bob Harrison MLB; 55 Matt Hazeltine OLB; 66 Carl Kammerer MLB; Defensive backs (DB): 37 Jimmy Johnson CB; 25 Dave Baker SS; 80 Jerry Mertens CB; 42 Jimmy Ridlon CB/S; 44 Eddie Dove FS; 40 Abe Woodson CB/RB; Special teams (ST): 36 Tommy Davis K/P	Reserve: 88 Clyde Conner WR (IR); 62 Mike Magac G (Military); 29 Dale Messer S (IR); Rookies in italics
