= Milt Plum =

American football player (born 1935)

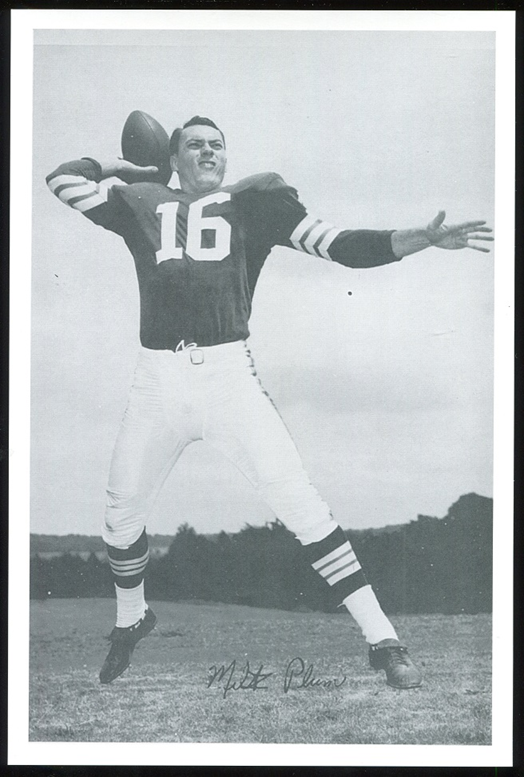
- Plum in 1961

No. 16
- Position: Quarterback

Personal information
- Born: January 20, 1935 (age 91); Westville, New Jersey, U.S.
- Listed height: 6 ft 1 in (1.85 m)
- Listed weight: 205 lb (93 kg)

Career information
- High school: Woodbury (NJ)
- College: Penn State
- NFL draft: 1957: 2nd round, 17th overall pick

Career history
- Cleveland Browns (1957–1961); Detroit Lions (1962–1967); Los Angeles Rams (1968); New York Giants (1969)

Awards and highlights
- Second-team All-Pro (1960); 2× Pro Bowl (1960, 1961); NFL passer rating leader (1960); 3× NFL completion percentage leader (1959–1961); First-team All-Eastern (1956)

Career NFL statistics
- Passing attempts: 2,419
- Passing completions: 1,306
- Completion percentage: 54.0%
- TD–INT: 122–127
- Passing yards: 17,536
- Passer rating: 72.2
- Rushing yards: 531
- Stats at Pro Football Reference

Milton Ross Plum (born January 20, 1935) is an American former professional football player who was a quarterback for the Cleveland Browns (1957–1961), Detroit Lions (1962–1967), Los Angeles Rams (1968) and New York Giants (1969) of the National Football League (NFL).

== Early life ==
Plum was born on January 20, 1935, in Westville, New Jersey, ten miles south of Philadelphia, growing up a Philadelphia Phillies and Philadelphia Eagles fan. Plum attended Woodbury High School, where for three years he played football (as quarterback and kicker), baseball (as a power hitting catcher), and basketball. He was selected as a first team All-State quarterback. He led an undefeated football team that won both the Colonial Conference and South Jersey Group III titles. His baseball and basketball teams also won Colonial Conference titles. After graduating in 1953, he chose college football over minor league baseball.

== College career ==
Plum received a football scholarship to Pennsylvania State University (Penn State), playing under coach Rip Engle for three years (1954-1956). He did spend considerable time studying game film with his quarterback coach, future Penn State head coach Joe Paterno. He played both quarterback and safety at Penn State, as well as placekicker and was an excellent punter.

Plum played sparingly at quarterback in 1954 for a Nittany Lions team ranked in the top 20 teams nationally. His playing time at quarterback increased in 1955, with his best game coming against Syracuse on November 5, 1955, and its star player Jim Brown (Plum's future NFL teammate, who would become the first player selected to the NFL 100th Anniversary All-Time Team). In that game, Plum threw a touchdown pass, intercepted a pass, scored the game-tying touchdown, and then kicked the extra point that won the game. Most memorably, he tackled Brown in the open field to prevent a touchdown.

Other career highlights include a 72-yard "coffin-corner" punt that gave Penn State a 1956 victory over favored, fifth-ranked, Ohio State, and a seven-interception season as a defensive back during his senior year. He had his most playing time as a quarterback in 1956, completing 40 of 75 passes for 675 yards and six touchdowns, while rushing for 70 yards, and leading the team to a 6–2–1 record.

== Professional career ==
After using their first-round pick in the 1957 NFL Draft on Jim Brown, the Browns chose Plum in the second round (17th overall pick).

Plum got onto the field at quarterback in the fourth game of the 1957 season when starter Tommy O'Connell got hurt against the Philadelphia Eagles. Plum and O'Connell split time throughout the rest of the 1957 season, in which the Browns went 9–2–1 and won the Eastern Conference. Plum played in 9 games, starting three. In the 1957 NFL Championship Game, O'Connell played the first half and Plum the second in a lop-sided loss to the Detroit Lions.

O'Connell left the NFL after the 1957 season, and over the next four years, Plum was a consistent part of an offense built around the running of Jim Brown and Bobby Mitchell.

Plum's passer rating of 110.4 in 1960 season was the best single-season NFL mark until 1989 when San Francisco quarterback Joe Montana surpassed it with a rating of 112.4. For his five seasons with Cleveland combined, Plum had a rating of 89.9, ranking him first among Browns quarterbacks with at least 750 pass attempts.

In 1960 and 1961, Plum's backup was Len Dawson, who went on to have a Hall of Fame career with the Kansas City Chiefs of the American Football League. Dawson did not see a future as a backup quarterback on a team that focused on the running game.

Plum had become frustrated with the offense in 1961, primarily because of coach Paul Brown's insistence on calling plays with no room for Plum to change calls, and refusal to use Bobby Mitchell as a receiver. In Mitchell's four years with the Browns (1958-1961), he caught 128 passes; after going to Washington, he caught 261 passes in his first four years, and led the NFL with 72 catches in 1962 (his first year away from the Browns).

The Browns traded Plum to the Lions as part of a six-player deal before the 1962 season. The Lions lacked the powerful running game of the Browns, forcing Plum to rely more often on his arm. Although he started strong, leading to the Lions to a 3–0 start, things went downhill after a costly interception in Week 4 led to a loss to the Green Bay Packers, after the Lions had led the game until late in the fourth quarter. Late in the season, head coach George Wilson benched Plum several times in favor of Earl Morrall. The Lions finished 11–3, two games behind Green Bay.

Plum lost the starting-quarterback job to Morrall in 1963, but regained it when Morrall got hurt early in the 1964 season. 1964 wound up being Plum's best year in Detroit; he threw for 2,241 yards and 18 touchdowns, and the Lions finished 7–5–2. The Lions traded Morrall to the Giants before the 1965 season, and Plum struggled that year, completing fewer than half of his passes. In 1966, Plum suffered a knee injury and was replaced by Karl Sweetan, who shared time with Plum in 1967.

Plum backed up Roman Gabriel on the 1968 Rams and Fran Tarkenton and Gary Wood on the 1969 Giants, playing sparingly both years. He retired after the 1969 season and moved to Raleigh, North Carolina.

Plum went 7–2–1 in starting season openers as quarterback for a .778 winning percentage, the second highest for a quarterback since 1950. He also holds the NFL record for longest completed pass to himself (20 yards).

Plum played in two Pro Bowls (1960 and 1961), was named Associated Press second team All-Pro in 1960, and was player of the week in week 7 of the 1964 season.

== NFL career statistics ==
Legend
	Led the league
**Bold**	Career high

=== Regular season ===
Year	Team	Games			Passing									Rushing					Sacks	
Year	Team	GP	GS	Record	Cmp	Att	Pct	Yds	Y/A	Lng	TD	Int	Rtg	Att	Yds	Avg	Lng	TD	Sck	Yds
1957	CLE	9	3	2–1	41	76	53.9	590	7.8	58	2	5	60.7	26	118	4.5	30	0	-	85
1958	CLE	12	11	9–2	102	189	54.0	1,619	8.6	74	11	11	77.9	**37**	107	2.9	22	**4**	-	145
1959	CLE	12	12	7–5	156	266	58.6	1,992	7.5	76	14	8	87.2	21	20	1.0	17	1	-	157
1960	CLE	12	12	8–3–1	151	250	**60.4**	2,297	**9.2**	86	**21**	5	**110.4**	17	-24	-1.4	7	2	6	**275**
1961	CLE	14	13	7–5–1	177	302	58.6	**2,416**	8.0	77	18	10	90.3	24	-17	-0.7	14	1	17	145
1962	DET	14	14	**11–3**	**179**	**325**	55.1	2,378	7.3	80	15	**20**	68.2	29	**170**	**5.9**	**45**	1	19	211
1963	DET	10	4	1–3	27	77	35.1	339	4.4	39	2	12	18.7	9	26	2.9	13	0	4	31
1964	DET	12	11	4–5–2	154	287	53.7	2,241	7.8	**92**	18	15	78.5	12	28	2.3	18	1	**27**	235
1965	DET	14	11	4–6–1	143	308	46.4	1,710	5.6	55	12	19	51.2	21	37	1.8	15	3	22	213
1966	DET	6	6	2–4	82	146	56.2	943	6.5	63	4	13	47.8	12	59	4.9	15	0	11	103
1967	DET	9	6	1–4–1	86	172	50.0	925	5.4	43	4	8	54.5	6	5	0.8	10	0	8	84
1968	LA	4	0	–	5	12	41.7	49	4.1	25	1	1	46.9	2	3	1.5	2	0	1	15
1969	NYG	1	0	–	3	9	33.3	37	4.1	23	0	0	47.0	1	-1	-1.0	-1	0	1	12
Career		129	103	56–41–6	1,306	2,419	54.0	17,536	7.2	92	122	127	72.2	217	531	2.4	45	13	116	1,711

=== Playoffs ===
Year	Team	Games			Passing									Rushing					Sacks	
Year	Team	GP	GS	Record	Cmp	Att	Pct	Yds	Y/A	Lng	TD	Int	Rtg	Att	Yds	Avg	Lng	TD	Sck	Yds
1957	CLE	1	0	0-0	5	**12**	41.7	51	4.3	18	0	**2**	14.9	**3**	**46**	**15.3**	**20**	0	-	-
1958	CLE	1	1	0–1	**7**	12	**58.3**	**83**	**6.9**	**29**	0	**2**	**39.9**	**3**	13	4.3	15	0	-	-
Career		2	1	0–1	12	24	50.0	134	5.6	29	0	4	27.4	6	59	9.8	20	0	-	-
