= Preston Powell =

American football player (1936–2020)

No. 40, 15
- Position: Fullback

Personal information
- Born: September 23, 1936; Winnfield, Louisiana, U.S.
- Died: August 23, 2020 (aged 83); Cleveland, Ohio, U.S.
- Listed height: 6 ft 2 in (1.88 m)
- Listed weight: 225 lb (102 kg)

Career information
- High school: Pinecrest (Winnfield)
- College: Grambling State
- NFL draft: 1961: 7th round, 97th overall pick
- AFL draft: 1961: 20th round, 154th overall pick

Career history
- Cleveland Browns (1961); Toronto Argonauts (1963)

Career NFL statistics
- Rushing yards: 5
- Rushing average: 5
- Return yards: 321
- Stats at Pro Football Reference

Preston J. Powell (September 23, 1936 – August 23, 2020) was an American professional football fullback. He played for the Cleveland Browns in 1961.

He died on August 23, 2020, in Cleveland, Ohio at age 83.
