= 1961 Dallas Cowboys season =

NFL team season

- Owner: Clint Murchison, Jr.
- General manager: Tex Schramm
- Head coach: Tom Landry
- Home stadium: Cotton Bowl

Results
- Record: 4–9–1
- Division place: 6th NFL Eastern
- Playoffs: Did not qualify

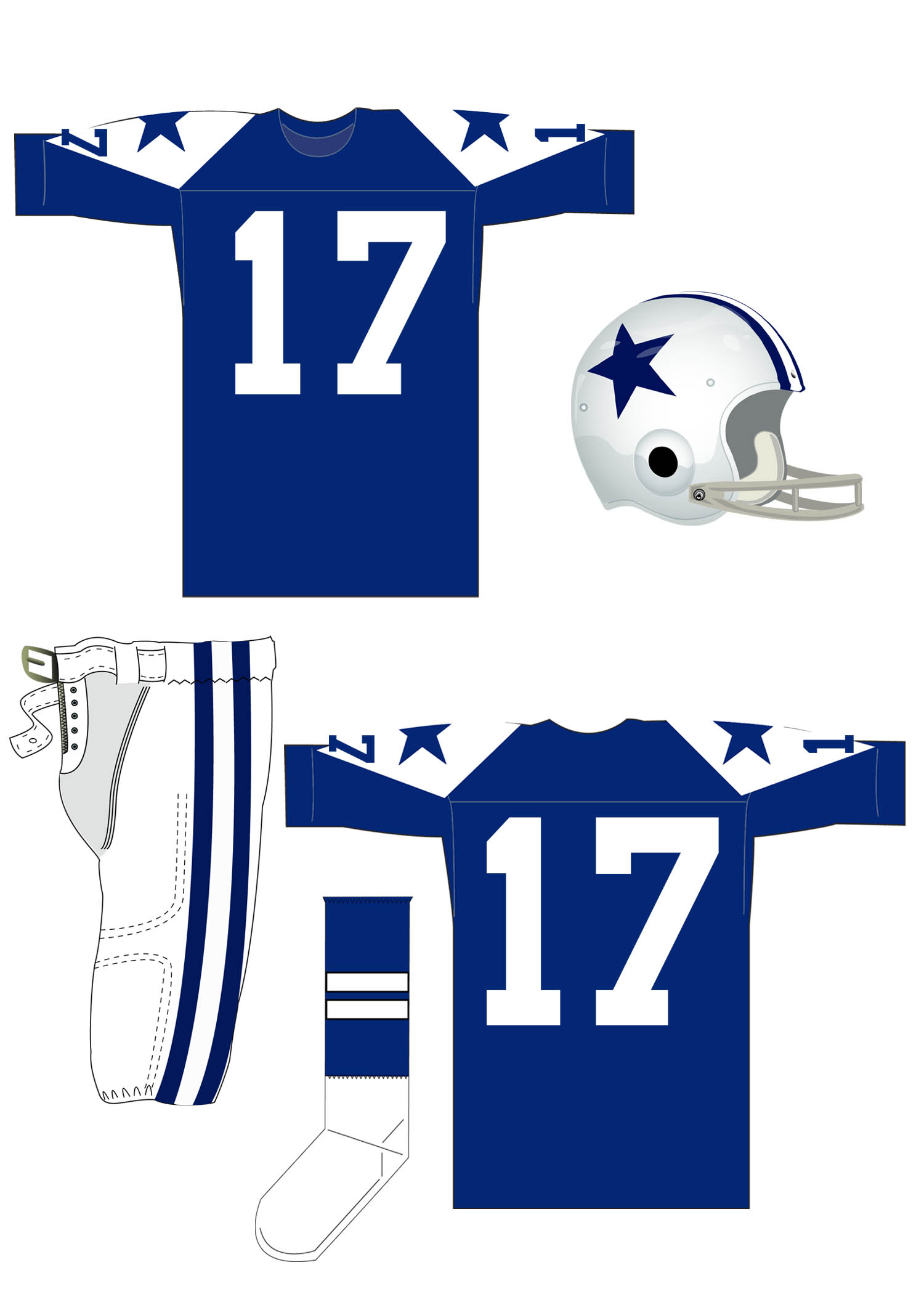
Dallas Cowboys home jerseys, 1960-61

The 1961 Dallas Cowboys season was their second in the National Football League. The team finished with 4 wins, 9 losses, and 1 tie, placing them 6th in the Eastern Conference. After going 0–11–1 the previous season, the Cowboys got their first win in franchise history with a 27–24 victory over the Pittsburgh Steelers in week 1.

== Offseason ==
The Cowboys participated in their first NFL college draft following the 1960 season. Despite owning the league's worst record, the team picked second overall because the expansion Minnesota Vikings received the first overall selection. However, the team previously traded away their first round pick in the 1961 draft to the Washington Redskins for quarterback Eddie LeBaron. The Cowboys had another selection in the first round (13th overall) that they acquired from the Cleveland Browns, and with that selection they chose defensive lineman Bob Lilly from Texas Christian University. Other notable selections in the draft included offensive linemen E.J. Holub, Billy Shaw, and Stew Barber. However, all three chose to sign with teams in the rival American Football League.

Other notable acquisitions by the Cowboys during the offseason included trading for linebacker Chuck Howley from the Chicago Bears, and signing rookie free agents Amos Marsh and Warren Livingston.

The Cowboys played in the NFL's Western Division for the 1960 season, but were a "swing team" and played each of the other 12 teams in the league that year. When the Minnesota Vikings joined the league for the 1961 season, the owners of the Eastern Division teams were allowed to vote on which expansion franchise they wanted to be permanently assigned to their division. In April 1961, the Eastern Division owners voted for Dallas, largely as a safeguard against early winters in Minnesota. This also pleased Western Division owners, who preferred the Vikings because of lower travel expenses and natural geographic rivalries with teams like the Green Bay Packers and Chicago Bears. This resulted in both Eastern and Western Divisions having seven teams.

=== NFL draft ===
1961 Dallas Cowboys draft
Round	Pick	Player	Position	College	Notes
1	13	Bob Lilly ^{†}	DT	TCU	
2	16	Chuck Howley *	C	West Virginia	
3	30	Stew Barber *	OT	Penn State	Signed with the AFL
4	44	Arnold Davis	E	Baylor	Played linebacker
7	86	Art Gilmore	RB	Oregon State	
8	100	Don Talbert	OT	Texas	
9	114	Glynn Gregory	E	SMU	Played also defensive back
11	142	Norris Stevenson	RB	Missouri	
12	156	Lowndes Shingler	QB	Clemson	
13	170	Don Goodman	RB	Florida	
14	184	Billy Shaw ^{†}	OG	Georgia Tech	Signed with the AFL
15	198	Julius Varnado	OT	San Francisco State	
16	212	Jerry Steffen	RB	Colorado	
17	226	Everett Cloud	RB	Maryland	
18	240	Randy Williams	RB	Indiana	
19	254	Lynn Hoyem	OG	Long Beach State	
20	268	Jerry Morgan	RB	Iowa State	
Made roster † Pro Football Hall of Fame * Made at least one Pro Bowl during career

=== Undrafted free agents ===
1961 undrafted free agents of note
Player	Position	College
Ken Frost	Defensive tackle	Tennessee
Warren Livingston	Cornerback	Arizona

== Roster ==
Dallas Cowboys 1961 roster
Quarterbacks: 11 Buddy Humphrey; 14 Eddie LeBaron; Running backs: 34 Merrill Douglas; 45 L. G. Dupre; 35 J. W. Lockett; 31 Amos Marsh; 43 Don Perkins; Wide receivers: 82 Frank Clarke; 81 Billy Howton; 80 Lee Murchison; Tight ends: 36 Dick Bielski K; 83 Jim Doran	Offensive linemen: 77 Byron Bradfute T; 53 Mike Connelly C; 62 Andy Cvercko G; 63 Mike Falls G; 75 Bob Fry T; 67 John Houser C; 64 Bob Grottkau G; 70 Bob McCreary T; Defensive linemen: 87 Nate Borden DE; 79 Ken Frost DT; 78 Don Healy DT; 72 Bill Herchman DT; 74 Bob Lilly DE	Linebackers: 33 Gene Babb OLB; 30 Mike Dowdle OLB; 54 Chuck Howley OLB; 56 Jack Patera MLB; 50 Jerry Tubbs MLB; Defensive backs: 44 Don Bishop CB; 32 Tom Franckhauser SS/CB; 21 Glynn Gregory SS/WR; 40 Jimmy Harris CB/FS; 47 Dicky Moegle FS; Special teams: 61 Allen Green K/P	Reserve lists: 20 Bob Bercich SS (IR); 51 Tom Braatz OLB (IR); 88 Sonny Davis OLB (IR); -- Don Heinrich QB (Retired); 41 Warren Livingston CB/FS (IR); 17 Don Meredith QB (IR); Rookies in italics 36 active, 6 inactive

== Preseason ==
Week	Date	Opponent	Result	Record	Venue	Attendance
1	August 5	vs. Minnesota Vikings	W 38–13	1–0	Howard Wood Field	4,954
2	August 11	Green Bay Packers	L 7–30	1–1	Cotton Bowl	30,000
3	August 26	vs. New York Giants	L 10–28	1–2	University Stadium	21,520
4	September 1	vs. Baltimore Colts	W 35–24	2–2	Oklahoma Memorial Stadium	19,000
5	September 9	vs. San Francisco 49ers	L 7–24	2–3	Hughes Stadium	22,130

== Schedule ==
Week	Date	Opponent	Result	Record	Venue	Attendance	Recap
1	September 17	**Pittsburgh Steelers**	**W** 27–24	1–0	Cotton Bowl	23,500	Recap
2	September 24	Minnesota Vikings	**W** 21–7	2–0	Cotton Bowl	20,500	Recap
3	October 1	at **Cleveland Browns**	**L** 7–25	2–1	Cleveland Stadium	43,638	Recap
4	October 8	at Minnesota Vikings	**W** 28–0	3–1	Metropolitan Stadium	33,070	Recap
5	October 15	**New York Giants**	**L** 10–31	3–2	Cotton Bowl	41,500	Recap
6	October 22	**Philadelphia Eagles**	**L** 7–43	3–3	Cotton Bowl	25,000	Recap
7	October 29	at **New York Giants**	**W** 17–16	4–3	Yankee Stadium	60,254	Recap
8	November 5	**St. Louis Cardinals**	**L** 17–31	4–4	Cotton Bowl	20,500	Recap
9	November 12	at **Pittsburgh Steelers**	**L** 7–37	4–5	Forbes Field	17,519	Recap
10	November 19	**Washington Redskins**	**T** 28–28	4–5–1	Cotton Bowl	17,500	Recap
11	November 26	at **Philadelphia Eagles**	**L** 13–35	4–6–1	Franklin Field	60,127	Recap
12	December 3	**Cleveland Browns**	**L** 17–38	4–7–1	Cotton Bowl	23,500	Recap
13	December 10	at **St. Louis Cardinals**	**L** 13–31	4–8–1	Busch Stadium	15,384	Recap
14	December 17	at **Washington Redskins**	**L** 24–34	4–9–1	D.C. Stadium	21,451	Recap

Conference opponents are in bold text

=== Game summaries ===
==== Week 1: vs. Pittsburgh Steelers ====
Week 1: Pittsburgh Steelers at Dallas Cowboys – Game summary

Quarter	1	2	3	4	Total
Steelers	0	14	0	10	**24**
**Cowboys**	7	3	7	10	**27**

at Cotton Bowl, Dallas, Texas

- Date: September 17
- Game weather: 66 °F (19 °C)
- Game attendance: 23,500
- Box score

Game information

**First quarter**

- DAL – Frank Clarke 44-yard pass from Don Meredith (Allen Green kick). Cowboys 7–0.

**Second quarter**

- PIT – John Henry Johnson 1-yard run (Bobby Layne kick). Tied 7–7.
- PIT – Buddy Dial 44-yard pass from Bobby Layne (Bobby Layne kick). Steelers 14–7.
- DAL – Allen Green 15-yard field goal. Steelers 14–10.

**Third quarter**

- DAL – Billy Howton 45-yard pass from Eddie LeBaron (Allen Green kick). Cowboys 17–14.

**Fourth quarter**

- PIT – Lou Michaels 12-yard field goal. Tied 17–17.
- PIT – Johnny Sample 39-yard interception return (Bobby Layne kick). Steelers 24–17.
- DAL – Dick Bielski 17-yard pass from Eddie LeBaron (Allen Green kick). Tied 24–24.
- DAL – Allen Green 27-yard field goal. Cowboys 27–24.

**Top passers**

- PIT – Bobby Layne – 16/25, 252 yards, TD, 3 INT
- DAL – Eddie LeBaron – 9/13, 166 yards, 2 TD

**Top rushers**

- PIT – Charley Scales – 17 rushes, 70 yards
- DAL – L. G. Dupre – 8 rushes, 25 yards

**Top receivers**

- PIT – Buddy Dial – 5 receptions, 137 yards, TD
- DAL – Billy Howton – 6 receptions, 138 yards, TD

== Standings ==
NFL Eastern Conference
	W	L	T	PCT	CONF	PF	PA	STK
New York Giants	10	3	1	.769	9–2–1	368	220	T1
Philadelphia Eagles	10	4	0	.714	8–4	361	297	W1
Cleveland Browns	8	5	1	.615	8–3–1	319	270	T1
St. Louis Cardinals	7	7	0	.500	7–5	279	267	W3
Pittsburgh Steelers	6	8	0	.429	5–7	295	287	L1
Dallas Cowboys	4	9	1	.308	2–9–1	236	380	L4
Washington Redskins	1	12	1	.077	1–10–1	174	392	W1

Note: Tie games were not officially counted in the standings until 1972.

== See also ==
- 1961 NFL season
- 1961 NFL draft

== Publications ==
- The Football Encyclopedia ISBN 0-312-11435-4
- Total Football ISBN 0-06-270170-3
- Cowboys Have Always Been My Heroes ISBN 0-446-51950-2
