= 1961 Baltimore Colts season =

9th season in franchise history

- Owner: Carroll Rosenbloom
- General manager: Don "Red" Kellett
- Head coach: Weeb Ewbank
- Home stadium: Memorial Stadium

Results
- Record: 8–6
- Division place: T-3rd NFL Western
- Playoffs: Did not qualify

The 1961 Baltimore Colts season was the ninth for the team in the National Football League. They finished the 1961 season with a record of 8 wins and 6 losses, tied for third in the Western Conference with the Chicago Bears.

Upset by the expansion Minnesota Vikings on November 12, the Colts dipped to 4–5; they won four of the last five to finish with a winning record.

== Offseason ==
=== NFL draft ===
1961 Baltimore Colts draft
Round	Pick	Player	Position	College	Notes
1	7	Tom Matte *	Running back	Ohio State	
2	21	Tom Gilburg	Tackle	Syracuse	
3	35	Jerry Hill	Running back	Wyoming	
4	49	Ken Gregory	End	Whittier	
5	62	Ed Dyas	Fullback	Auburn	
5	63	Ron Osborne	Tackle	Clemson	
Made roster * Made at least one Pro Bowl during career

== Roster ==
1961 Baltimore Colts roster
Quarterbacks (QB): 14 Lamar McHan; 19 Johnny Unitas; Running backs (RB): 45 Jerry Hill; 24 Lenny Moore; 34 Joe Perry; 32 Mark Smolinski; Wide receivers (WR): 82 Raymond Berry; 88 Ken Gregory; 25 Alex Hawkins; 28 Jimmy Orr; Tight ends (TE): 87 Aubrey Linne; 85 Dee Mackey; 84 Jim Mutscheller	Offensive linemen (OL): 61 Wiley Feagin G; 73 Tom Gilburg T/P; 77 Jim Parker T; 60 George Preas T; 62 Palmer Pyle G; 68 Alex Sandusky G; 52 Dick Szymanski C; Defensive linemen (DL): 75 Jim Colvin DT; 78 John Diehl DT; 70 Art Donovan DT; 89 Gino Marchetti DE; 83 Billy Ray Smith DT/DE	Linebackers (LB): 55 Jackie Burkett OLB; 64 Marv Matuszak MLB; 36 Bill Pellington MLB/OLB; 66 Don Shinnick OLB; Defensive backs (DB): 40 Bobby Boyd CB; 47 Gary Glick CB; 20 Bob Harrison FS; 43 Lenny Lyles FS; 80 Andy Nelson SS; 46 Jim Welch CB/S; Special teams (ST): 65 Steve Myhra K/LB	Reserve: 81 Ordell Braase DE (IR); 72 Joe Lewis DT (IR); 27 Tom Matte RB (IR); Rookies in italics

== Preseason ==
Week	Date	Opponent	Result	Record	Venue	Attendance
1	August 12	vs. Pittsburgh Steelers	L 20–24	0–1	Victory Stadium	15,000
2	August 18	Minnesota Vikings	W 13–3	1–1	Memorial Stadium	10,203
3	August 26	vs. Washington Redskins	W 41–7	2–1	Foreman Field	20,302
4	September 1	vs. Dallas Cowboys	L 24–35	2–2	Oklahoma Memorial Stadium	19,000
5	September 10	vs. New York Giants	W 49–20	3–2	Yale Bowl	50,737

== Regular season ==
Program for the December 3 game against the visiting San Francisco 49ers.

=== Schedule ===
Week	Date	Opponent	Result	Record	Venue	Attendance
1	September 17	**Los Angeles Rams**	**W** 27–24	1–0	Memorial Stadium	54,259
2	September 24	**Detroit Lions**	**L** 15–16	1–1	Memorial Stadium	54,259
3	October 1	**Minnesota Vikings**	**W** 34–33	2–1	Memorial Stadium	54,259
4	October 8	at **Green Bay Packers**	**L** 7–45	2–2	New City Stadium	38,669
5	October 15	at **Chicago Bears**	**L** 10–24	2–3	Wrigley Field	48,719
6	October 22	at **Detroit Lions**	**W** 17–14	3–3	Tiger Stadium	53,016
7	October 29	**Chicago Bears**	**L** 20–21	3–4	Memorial Stadium	57,641
8	November 5	**Green Bay Packers**	**W** 45–21	4–4	Memorial Stadium	57,641
9	November 12	at **Minnesota Vikings**	**L** 20–28	4–5	Metropolitan Stadium	38,010
10	November 19	St. Louis Cardinals	**W** 16–0	5–5	Memorial Stadium	56,112
11	November 26	at Washington Redskins	**W** 27–6	6–5	D.C. Stadium	41,062
12	December 3	**San Francisco 49ers**	**W** 20–17	7–5	Memorial Stadium	57,641
13	December 9	at **Los Angeles Rams**	**L** 17–34	7–6	Los Angeles Memorial Coliseum	41,268
14	December 16	at **San Francisco 49ers**	**W** 27–24	8–6	Kezar Stadium	45,517
Note: Intra-conference opponents are in **bold** text.

== Standings ==
NFL Western Conference
	W	L	T	PCT	CONF	PF	PA	STK
Green Bay Packers	11	3	0	.786	9–3	391	223	W1
Detroit Lions	8	5	1	.615	7–4–1	270	258	L1
Chicago Bears	8	6	0	.571	7–5	326	302	W2
Baltimore Colts	8	6	0	.571	6–6	302	307	W1
San Francisco 49ers	7	6	1	.538	6–5–1	346	272	L1
Los Angeles Rams	4	10	0	.286	3–9	263	333	L1
Minnesota Vikings	3	11	0	.214	3–9	285	407	L2

Note: Tie games were not officially counted in the standings until 1972.

== See also ==
- History of the Indianapolis Colts
- Indianapolis Colts seasons
- Colts–Patriots rivalry
