= Bob McCreary =

American gridiron football player (born 1939)

No. 70
- Position: Offensive tackle

Personal information
- Born: June 20, 1939 (age 87); Lenoir, North Carolina, U.S.
- Listed height: 6 ft 5 in (1.96 m)
- Listed weight: 256 lb (116 kg)

Career information
- High school: Hudson (Hudson, North Carolina)
- College: Wake Forest (1957–1960)
- NFL draft: 1961: 5th round, 65th overall pick

Career history
- San Francisco 49ers (1961)*; Dallas Cowboys (1961–1962); Calgary Stampeders (1963)
- * Offseason or practice squad member only

Career NFL statistics
- Games played: 9
- Games started: 4
- Stats at Pro Football Reference

Bobby Joe McCreary (born June 20, 1939) is an American former professional football player who was an offensive tackle for the Dallas Cowboys of the National Football League (NFL). He played college football for the Wake Forest Demon Deacons. He also played professionally for the Calgary Stampeders in the Canadian Football League (CFL).

== Early life ==
McCreary attended Hudson High School in Hudson, North Carolina. He developed into an honorable-mention All-state football player as a senior. He also played basketball.

McCreary accepted a football scholarship from Wake Forest University. After sustaining a career-threatening knee injury as a freshman in 1958 (torn medial collateral ligament), he recovered to become a two-way offensive and defensive tackle.

== Professional career ==
=== San Francisco 49ers ===
McCreary was selected by the San Francisco 49ers in the fifth round (65th overall) of the 1961 NFL draft. He was waived on September 4.

=== Dallas Cowboys ===
On September 6, 1961, McCreary was signed by the Dallas Cowboys. He began the season on the taxi squad, before being promoted to the active roster on October 20. McCreary appeared in nine games, with four starts at right tackle. He was released on September 3, 1962.

=== Calgary Stampeders (CFL) ===
In 1963, McCreary was signed by the Calgary Stampeders of the CFL.

== Personal life ==
After retiring from professional football, McCreary worked for twenty years in sales in the furniture industry, before starting his own home-furnishing business, McCreary Modern in 1986.

In 2008, he received the Gene Hooks Achievement Award from the Wake Forest Varsity Club. In 2013, McCreary was inducted into the Wake Forest Sports Hall of Fame. McCreary has also been inducted into the Caldwell County Sports Hall of Fame.

In 2014, McCreary committed $7.5 million to Wake Forest University football's indoor practice facility project. The facility was declared to be named in honor of McCreary. The plaza outside gate 1 at Truist Field and video board inside the stadium are also named for McCreary, as is the strength and conditioning center.
