= 1961 Detroit Lions season =

NFL team season (won NFL Playoff Bowl)

- Head coach: George Wilson

Results
- Record: 8–5–1
- Division place: 2nd NFL Western
- Playoffs: Won NFL Playoff Bowl (vs. Eagles) 38–10

The 1961 Detroit Lions season was the 32nd season in franchise history. Detroit was runner-up in the Western conference at 8–5–1, then won a second Playoff Bowl game against the Philadelphia Eagles that was played in the Orange Bowl, 38–10.

This was also the first season that the silhouetted blue lion logo appeared on the helmets.

== Offseason ==
=== NFL draft ===
1961 Detroit Lions draft
Round	Pick	Player	Position	College	Notes
2	23	Dan LaRose	Tackle	Missouri	
3	38	Houston Antwine *	Defensive tackle	Southern Illinois	
4	51	Ron Hartline	Running back	Oklahoma	
Made roster * Made at least one Pro Bowl during career

== Roster ==
1961 Detroit Lions roster
Quarterbacks: 14 Earl Morrall; 15 Jim Ninowski; Running backs: 40 Howard Cassady; 45 Dan Lewis; 33 Nick Pietrosante; 0 Johnny Olszewski; 34 Ken Webb; Wide receivers: 41 Terry Barr; 89 Gail Cogdill; 87 Glenn Davis; 25 Pat Studstill; Tight ends: 80 Jim Gibbons	Offensive linemen: 79 John Gonzaga T; 75 John Gordy G; 77 Dan LaRose T; 67 Dick Mills G; 50 Bob Scholtz C; 66 Harley Sewell G; 73 Ollie Spencer T/G; 74 Paul Ward G; 61 Bob Whitlow C/G; Defensive linemen: 76 Roger Brown DT; 53 Bill Glass DE; 71 Alex Karras DT; 78 Darris McCord DE; 88 Sam Williams DE	Linebackers: 57 Carl Brettschneider OLB; 54 Max Messner OLB; 56 Joe Schmidt MLB; 55 Wayne Walker OLB/K; Defensive backs: 81 Night Train Lane CB; 28 Yale Lary FS/P; 44 Dick LeBeau CB; 43 Gary Lowe SS; 21 Bruce Maher CB; Special teams: 47 Jim Martin K	Reserve lists: 72 Gil Mains DT (IR); 70 Willie McClung T (IR); Note: rookies in italics

== Regular season ==
According to the team, a total of 39,501 season tickets were sold by the Lions for the 1961 campaign. The Lions played their home games in Briggs Stadium (Tiger Stadium), which had a regular listed seating capacity of 46,194, with an additional 7,000 bleacher seats for football to bring total capacity to 53,194.

=== Schedule ===
Week	Date	Opponent	Result	Record	Attendance
1	September 17	at Green Bay Packers	W 17–13	1–0	32,150
2	September 24	at Baltimore Colts	W 16–15	2–0	49,825
3	October 1	San Francisco 49ers	L 0–49	2–1	38,065
4	October 8	Chicago Bears	L 17–31	2–2	53,854
5	October 15	Los Angeles Rams	W 14–13	3–2	53,295
6	October 22	Baltimore Colts	L 14–17	3–3	48,447
7	October 29	at Los Angeles Rams	W 28–10	4–3	54,019
8	November 5	at San Francisco 49ers	T 20–20	4–3–1	46,267
9	November 12	at St. Louis Cardinals	W 45–14	5–3–1	54,123
10	November 19	at Minnesota Vikings	W 37–10	6–3–1	57,808
11	November 23	Green Bay Packers	L 9–17	6–4–1	43,272
12	December 3	at Chicago Bears	W 16–15	7–4–1	51,017
13	December 10	Minnesota Vikings	W 13–7	8–4–1	42,655
14	December 17	Philadelphia Eagles	L 24–27	8–5–1	44,231

== Standings ==
NFL Western Conference
	W	L	T	PCT	CONF	PF	PA	STK
Green Bay Packers	11	3	0	.786	9–3	391	223	W1
Detroit Lions	8	5	1	.615	7–4–1	270	258	L1
Chicago Bears	8	6	0	.571	7–5	326	302	W2
Baltimore Colts	8	6	0	.571	6–6	302	307	W1
San Francisco 49ers	7	6	1	.538	6–5–1	346	272	L1
Los Angeles Rams	4	10	0	.286	3–9	263	333	L1
Minnesota Vikings	3	11	0	.214	3–9	285	407	L2

Note: Tie games were not officially counted in the standings until 1972.

== Playoff Bowl ==
The Playoff Bowl matched the runners-up of the two conferences to determine third place in the league. It was played in January at the Orange Bowl in Miami, Florida, the week following the NFL Championship game. This season's participants, Detroit and Philadelphia, had met three weeks earlier in the last game of the regular season, a three-point Eagles' road win, and were slightly favored in Miami.

This was the second year for the game and the Lions repeated as winners; it is classified by the NFL as an exhibition game, rather than postseason.

Round	Date	Opponent	Result	Venue	Attendance
Playoff Bowl	January 6, 1962	Philadelphia Eagles	W 38–10	Orange Bowl	25,612
