= Bill McPeak =

American football player and coach (1926–1991)

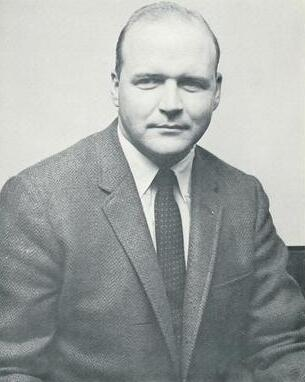
- McPeak in 1961

No. 37, 84
- Position: Defensive end

Personal information
- Born: July 26, 1926; New Castle, Pennsylvania, U.S.
- Died: May 7, 1991 (aged 64); Foxboro, Massachusetts, U.S.
- Listed height: 6 ft 1 in (1.85 m)
- Listed weight: 208 lb (94 kg)

Career information
- High school: New Castle
- College: Notre Dame (1944); Pittsburgh (1945-1948)
- NFL draft: 1948: 16th round, 142nd overall pick

Career history

Playing
- Cleveland Browns (1949)*; Pittsburgh Steelers (1949–1957)
- * Offseason or practice squad member only

Coaching
- Pittsburgh Steelers (1956–1958) Defensive line coach; Washington Redskins (1959–1960) Assistant coach; Washington Redskins (1961–1965) Head coach/general manager; Detroit Lions (1967–1972) Offensive coordinator; Miami Dolphins (1973–1974) Offensive coordinator; Chicago Winds (1975) Offensive coordinator; Philadelphia Bell (1975) Offensive coordinator

Awards and highlights
- Super Bowl champion (VIII); Second-team All-Pro (1953); 3× Pro Bowl (1952, 1953, 1956)

Career NFL statistics
- Games played: 105
- Games started: 88
- Fumble recoveries: 7
- Stats at Pro Football Reference

Head coaching record
- Regular season: 21–46–3 (.321)
- Coaching profile at Pro Football Reference
- Executive profile at Pro Football Reference

William Patrick McPeak (July 24, 1926 – May 7, 1991) was an American professional football player and coach in the National Football League (NFL). He was selected by the Pittsburgh Steelers in the 16th round of the 1948 NFL draft, playing nine seasons for them. He also was the head coach of the Washington Redskins and offensive coordinator of the Miami Dolphins.

== Playing career ==
Born in New Castle, Pennsylvania, McPeak was a star defensive end for the University of Pittsburgh. He was drafted by the Pittsburgh Steelers where he played from 1949 to 1957. During the final two years of his playing career he also became an assistant coach for the team.

== Head coaching career ==
In 1959, McPeak joined the Washington Redskins as an assistant under head coach Mike Nixon. After Nixon's dismissal following the 1960 NFL season, McPeak was promoted to head coach and general manager on December 19, 1960; he was the youngest head coach in the league at the age of 34. He remained in that position until 1965. It was McPeak that persuaded team owner George Preston Marshall to go with Norm Snead as their quarterback with their first round pick in 1961 (over players such as Fran Tarkenton, picked two rounds later by Minnesota). A five-win season in 1962 was their highest in five years; it was the first with Bobby Mitchell, who they traded for to make the first black player in franchise history.

McPeak got a two-year contract and raise after winning six games in 1964. He was then fired after the next season.

Although the Redskins did not have a winning season under McPeak with an overall 21-46-3 record, the team acquired players, many of whom would become future Hall of Famers, that would eventually play a part in their later winning years. They include Sonny Jurgensen, Bobby Mitchell, Charley Taylor, Jerry Smith, Len Hauss, and Chris Hanburger.

McPeak was fired after 1965 for Otto Graham, who was given a ten-year contract by team president Edward Bennett Williams.

== Later coaching and scouting ==
After spending the 1966 season as a color commentator for St. Louis Cardinals games on CBS, McPeak joined the Detroit Lions as an offensive coordinator in 1967, a position he held until 1972 when he moved on to the Miami Dolphins to replace Howard Schnellenberger who became head coach of the Baltimore Colts. His tenure in Miami would last for only two seasons due to complications suffered after a stroke, which he spent several years recovering from. He would later join the New England Patriots after returning to health, where he became director of scouting for twelve years.

McPeak died of a heart attack on May 7, 1991, at the age of 64 at his home in Foxboro, Massachusetts.
