= 1961 Chicago Bears season =

NFL team season

- Owner: George Halas
- General manager: George Halas
- Head coach: George Halas
- Home stadium: Wrigley Field

Results
- Record: 8–6
- Division place: T–3rd NFL Western
- Playoffs: Did not qualify

The 1961 Chicago Bears season was their 42nd regular season completed in the National Football League. The team finished with an 8–6 record under George Halas, which was an improvement over the 5–6–1 record of the previous season.

== Offseason ==
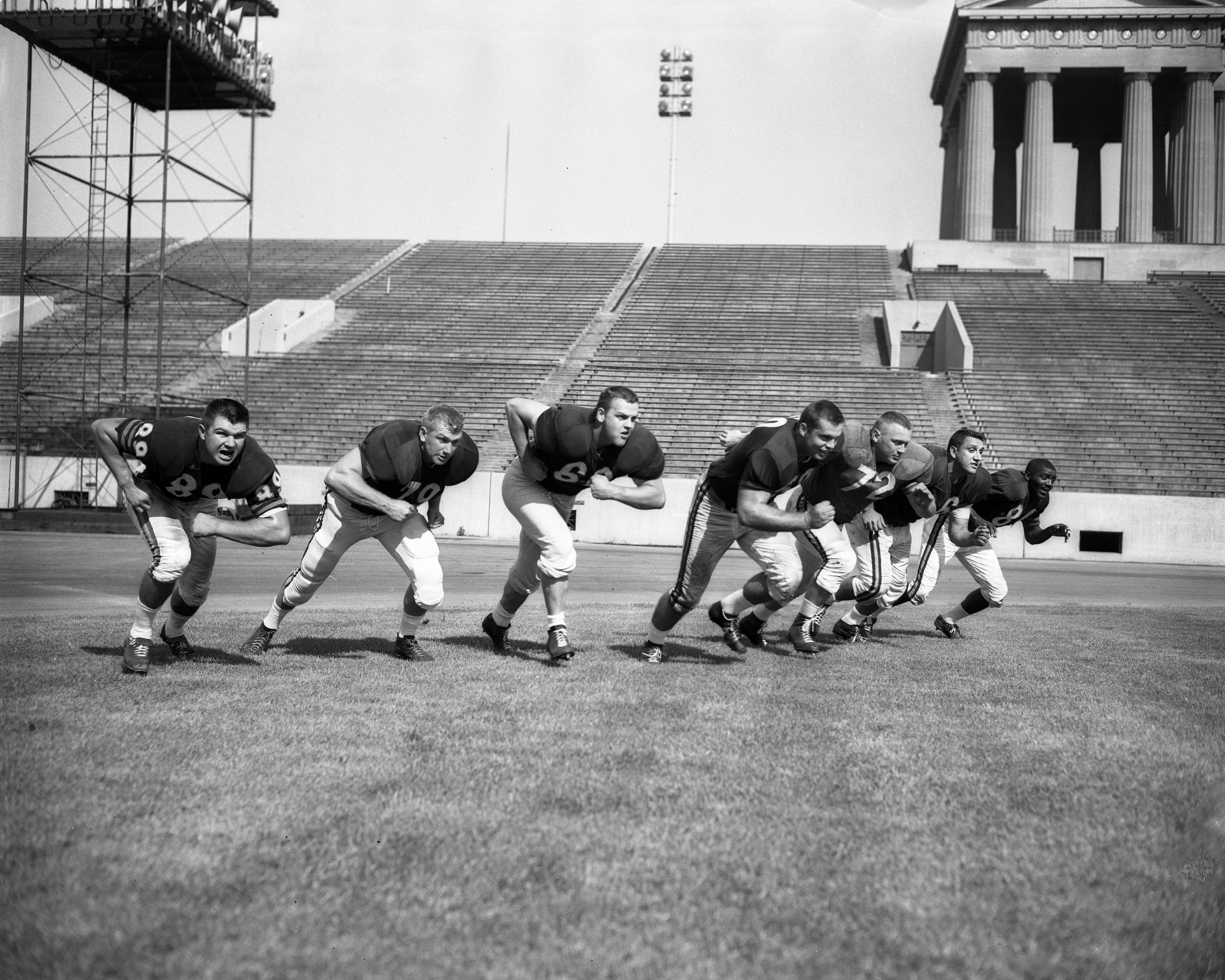
1961 Bears offensive line practicing for the Armed Forces Benefit Football Game

On January 14, Chicago Bears End Willard Dewveall played out his option and joined the Houston Oilers of the American Football League. He became the first player to move deliberately from one league to another.

The Bears were notable for taking part in an exhibition game in their first ever game outside of the United States, taking on the CFL's Montreal Alouettes (the original team), winning 34–16.

=== Draft ===
1961 Chicago Bears draft
| Round | Pick | Player | Position | College | Notes |
| 1 | 5 | Mike Ditka * ^{†} | Tight end | Pittsburgh | |
| 2 | 20 | Bill Brown * | Fullback | Illinois | |
| 3 | 33 | Hoot Gibson | Cornerback | NC State | |
| 4 | 48 | Ernie Ladd | Tackle | Grambling | |
| 5 | 61 | Keith Lincoln * | Running back | Washington State | |
| 6 | 76 | George Fleming | Running back | Washington | |
| 7 | 89 | Mike Pyle * | Center | Yale | |
| 8 | 104 | Ed Ryan | Back | Michigan State | |
| 9 | 117 | Bobby Bethune | Safety | Mississippi State | |
| 10 | 132 | Jason Harness | End | Michigan State | |
| 11 | 145 | Sam Fewell | Tackle | South Carolina | |
| 12 | 160 | Howard Dyer | Quarterback | VMI | |
| 13 | 173 | Bob McLeod | Wide receiver | Abilene Christian | |
| 14 | 188 | Jim Tyrer * | Tackle | Ohio State | |
| 15 | 201 | Chuck Linning | Tackle | Miami (FL) | |
| 16 | 216 | Wayne Frazier | Center | Auburn | |
| 17 | 229 | Rossie Barfield | End | North Carolina Central | |
| 18 | 244 | John Finn | Tackle | Louisville | |
| 19 | 257 | Ben Charles | Quarterback | South Carolina | |
| 20 | 272 | Gordon Mason | Back | Tennessee Tech | |
Made roster † Pro Football Hall of Fame * Made at least one Pro Bowl during career

=== Undrafted free agents ===
1961 undrafted free agents of note
| Player | Position | College |
|---|---|---|
| Art Anderson | Tackle | Idaho |
| Don Mullins | Safety | Houston |
| Roosevelt Taylor | Safety | Grambling |
| Paul Ward | Defensive end | Whitworth |

== Roster ==
1961 Chicago Bears roster
| Quarterbacks (QB): 15 Ed Brown P; 12 Dick Norman; 9 Billy Wade; Running backs (RB): 39 John Adams; 49 Charlie Bivins; 38 Bill Brown; 35 Rick Casares; 28 Willie Galimore; Wide receivers (WR): 46 Angelo Coia; 43 Jim Dooley; 84 Bo Farrington; 47 Johnny Morris; Tight ends (TE): 89 Mike Ditka | Offensive linemen (OL): 79 Art Anderson T; 60 Roger Davis G; 65 Stan Fanning T; 73 Stan Jones G; 67 Ted Karras G; 70 Herman Lee T; 50 Mike Pyle C; 63 Bob Wetoska G/T; Defensive linemen (DL): 81 Doug Atkins DE; 74 Bob Kilcullen DT/DE; 76 John Mellekas DT; 75 Fred Williams DT; 82 Maury Youmans DE | Linebackers (LB): 31 Joe Fortunato OLB; 61 Bill George MLB; 53 Ken Kirk OLB; 54 Roger LeClerc MLB/K; 33 Larry Morris OLB; Defensive backs (DB): 25 J. C. Caroline CB; 87 Harlon Hill FS/WR; 20 Bobby Jackson SS; 86 Pete Manning CB; 40 Don Mullins FS; 17 Richie Petitbon SS; 24 Rosey Taylor FS/CB; 23 Dave Whitsell CB; Special teams (ST) | Reserve: 71 Earl Leggett DE/DT (IR); Rookies in italics |

== Schedule ==
| Game | Date | Opponent | Result | Record | Venue | Attendance | Recap | Sources |
|---|---|---|---|---|---|---|---|---|
| 1 | September 17 | at **Minnesota Vikings** | **L** 13–37 | 0–1 | Metropolitan Stadium | 32,236 | Recap | |
| 2 | September 23 | at **Los Angeles Rams** | **W** 21–17 | 1–1 | L.A. Memorial Coliseum | 53,315 | Recap | |
| 3 | October 1 | at **Green Bay Packers** | **L** 0–24 | 1–2 | City Stadium | 38,669 | Recap | |
| 4 | October 8 | at **Detroit Lions** | **W** 31–17 | 2–2 | Briggs Stadium | 53,854 | Recap | |
| 5 | October 15 | **Baltimore Colts** | **W** 24–10 | 3–2 | Wrigley Field | 48,719 | Recap | |
| 6 | October 22 | **San Francisco 49ers** | **W** 31–0 | 4–2 | Wrigley Field | 49,070 | Recap | |
| 7 | October 29 | at **Baltimore Colts** | **W** 21–20 | 5–2 | Memorial Stadium | 57,641 | Recap | |
| 8 | November 5 | at Philadelphia Eagles | **L** 14–16 | 5–3 | Franklin Field | 60,671 | Recap | |
| 9 | November 12 | **Green Bay Packers** | **L** 28–31 | 5–4 | Wrigley Field | 49,711 | Recap | |
| 10 | November 19 | at **San Francisco 49ers** | **L** 31–41 | 5–5 | Kezar Stadium | 52,972 | Recap | |
| 11 | November 26 | **Los Angeles Rams** | **W** 28–24 | 6–5 | Wrigley Field | 45,965 | Recap | |
| 12 | December 3 | **Detroit Lions** | **L** 15–16 | 6–6 | Wrigley Field | 51,017 | Recap | |
| 13 | December 10 | Cleveland Browns | **W** 17–14 | 7–6 | Wrigley Field | 38,717 | Recap | |
| 14 | December 17 | **Minnesota Vikings** | **W** 52–35 | 8–6 | Wrigley Field | 34,539 | Recap | |
Note: Intra-conference opponents are in **bold** text.

== Standings ==
Program for the December 10 game against the visiting Cleveland Browns.

NFL Western Conference
| | W | L | T | PCT | CONF | PF | PA | STK |
|---|---|---|---|---|---|---|---|---|
| Green Bay Packers | 11 | 3 | 0 | .786 | 9–3 | 391 | 223 | W1 |
| Detroit Lions | 8 | 5 | 1 | .615 | 7–4–1 | 270 | 258 | L1 |
| Chicago Bears | 8 | 6 | 0 | .571 | 7–5 | 326 | 302 | W2 |
| Baltimore Colts | 8 | 6 | 0 | .571 | 6–6 | 302 | 307 | W1 |
| San Francisco 49ers | 7 | 6 | 1 | .538 | 6–5–1 | 346 | 272 | L1 |
| Los Angeles Rams | 4 | 10 | 0 | .286 | 3–9 | 263 | 333 | L1 |
| Minnesota Vikings | 3 | 11 | 0 | .214 | 3–9 | 285 | 407 | L2 |

Note: Tie games were not officially counted in the standings until 1972.

=== Game summaries ===
==== Week 1 ====
| Team | 1 | 2 | 3 | 4 | Total |
|---|---|---|---|---|---|
| Bears | 0 | 6 | 0 | 7 | 13 |
| • Vikings | 3 | 7 | 14 | 13 | 37 |

- Date: September 17
- Location: Metropolitan Stadium
- Game attendance: 32,236
- Game weather: 61 °F (16 °C); wind 13 mph

==== Week 2 ====
| Team | 1 | 2 | 3 | 4 | Total |
|---|---|---|---|---|---|
| • Bears | 7 | 0 | 7 | 7 | 21 |
| Rams | 3 | 7 | 0 | 7 | 17 |

- Date: September 23
- Location: Los Angeles Memorial Coliseum
- Game attendance: 53,315
- Game weather: 65 °F (18 °C); wind 10 mph

==== Week 3 ====
| Team | 1 | 2 | 3 | 4 | Total |
|---|---|---|---|---|---|
| Bears | 0 | 0 | 0 | 0 | 0 |
| • Packers | 7 | 3 | 7 | 7 | 24 |

- Date: October 1
- Location: City Stadium
- Game attendance: 38,669
- Game weather: 46 °F (8 °C); wind 19 mph

==== Week 4 ====
| Team | 1 | 2 | 3 | 4 | Total |
|---|---|---|---|---|---|
| • Bears | 0 | 7 | 3 | 21 | 31 |
| Lions | 10 | 0 | 7 | 0 | 17 |

- Date: October 8
- Location: Tiger Stadium
- Game attendance: 53,854
- Game weather: 60 °F (16 °C); wind 7 mph

==== Week 5 ====
| Team | 1 | 2 | 3 | 4 | Total |
|---|---|---|---|---|---|
| Colts | 0 | 7 | 0 | 3 | 10 |
| • Bears | 3 | 7 | 0 | 14 | 24 |

- Date: October 15
- Location: Wrigley Field • Chicago, Illinois
- Game attendance: 48,719
- Game weather: 50 °F (10 °C) • Wind 13 mph

Scoring summary
| 1 | CHI | Roger LeClerc 14-yard field goal | Bears 3–0 |
| 2 | BAL | Johnny Unitas 7-yard run (Steve Myhra kick) | Colts 7–3 |
| 2 | CHI | Johnny Morris 8-yard pass from Ed Brown (Roger LeClerc kick) | Bears 10–7 |
| 4 | BAL | Steve Myhra 32-yard field goal | Tie 10–10 |
| 4 | CHI | Willie Galimore 84-yard pass from Ed Brown (Roger LeClerc kick) | Bears 17–10 |
| 4 | CHI | Rick Casares 1-yard run (Roger LeClerc kick) | Bears 24–10 |

==== Week 6 ====
| Team | 1 | 2 | 3 | 4 | Total |
|---|---|---|---|---|---|
| 49ers | 0 | 0 | 0 | 0 | 0 |
| • Bears | 0 | 14 | 7 | 10 | 31 |

- Date: October 22
- Location: Wrigley Field
- Game attendance: 49,070
- Game weather: 49 °F (9 °C); wind 8 mph

==== Week 7 ====
| Team | 1 | 2 | 3 | 4 | Total |
|---|---|---|---|---|---|
| • Bears | 0 | 7 | 7 | 7 | 21 |
| Colts | 7 | 7 | 6 | 0 | 20 |

- Date: October 29
- Location: Memorial Stadium • Baltimore, Maryland
- Game attendance: 57,641
- Game weather: 52 °F (11 °C) • Wind 8 mph

Scoring summary
| 1 | BAL | Joe Perry 21 -yard pass from Johnny Unitas (Steve Myhra kick) | Colts 7–0 |
| 2 | BAL | Lenny Moore 68-yard pass from Johnny Unitas (Steve Myhra kick) | Colts 14–0 |
| 2 | CHI | Mike Ditka 19-yard pass from Bill Wade (Roger LeClerc kick) | Colts 14–7 |
| 3 | BAL | Alex Hawkins 1-yard run (kick failed) | Colts 20–7 |
| 3 | CHI | Johnny Morris 41-yard pass from Bill Wade (Roger LeClerc kick) | Colts 20–14 |
| 4 | CHI | Rick Casares 5-yard run (Roger LeClerc kick) | Bears 21–20 |

==== Week 8 ====
| Team | 1 | 2 | 3 | 4 | Total |
|---|---|---|---|---|---|
| Bears | 7 | 7 | 0 | 0 | 14 |
| • Eagles | 3 | 7 | 6 | 0 | 16 |

- Date: November 5
- Location: Franklin Field
- Game attendance: 60,671
- Game weather: 68 °F (20 °C); wind 9 mph

==== Week 9 ====
| Team | 1 | 2 | 3 | 4 | Total |
|---|---|---|---|---|---|
| • Packers | 7 | 21 | 3 | 0 | 31 |
| Bears | 7 | 0 | 7 | 14 | 28 |

- Date: November 12
- Location: Wrigley Field
- Game attendance: 49,711
- Game weather: 52 °F (11 °C); wind 13 mph

==== Week 10 ====
| Team | 1 | 2 | 3 | 4 | Total |
|---|---|---|---|---|---|
| Bears | 7 | 3 | 7 | 14 | 31 |
| • 49ers | 17 | 3 | 21 | 0 | 41 |

- Date: November 19
- Location: Kezar Stadium
- Game attendance: 52,972
- Game weather: 48 °F (9 °C); wind 7 mph

==== Week 11 ====
| Team | 1 | 2 | 3 | 4 | Total |
|---|---|---|---|---|---|
| Rams | 7 | 0 | 3 | 14 | 24 |
| • Bears | 7 | 14 | 0 | 7 | 28 |

- Date: November 26
- Location: Wrigley Field
- Game attendance: 45,965
- Game weather: 49 °F (9 °C); wind 12 mph

==== Week 12 ====
| Team | 1 | 2 | 3 | 4 | Total |
|---|---|---|---|---|---|
| • Lions | 0 | 9 | 0 | 7 | 16 |
| Bears | 3 | 3 | 6 | 3 | 15 |

- Date: December 3
- Location: Wrigley Field
- Game attendance: 51,017
- Game weather: 44 °F (7 °C); wind 10 mph

==== Week 13 ====
| Team | 1 | 2 | 3 | 4 | Total |
|---|---|---|---|---|---|
| Browns | 14 | 0 | 0 | 0 | 14 |
| • Bears | 0 | 0 | 0 | 17 | 17 |

- Date: December 10
- Location: Wrigley Field
- Game attendance: 38,717
- Game weather: 30 °F (−1 °C); wind 15 mph

==== Week 14 ====
| Team | 1 | 2 | 3 | 4 | Total |
|---|---|---|---|---|---|
| Vikings | 14 | 7 | 7 | 7 | 35 |
| • Bears | 7 | 14 | 24 | 7 | 52 |

- Date: December 17
- Location: Wrigley Field, Chicago, Illinois
- Game attendance: 34,539
- Game weather: 33 °F (1 °C); wind 13 mph

Scoring summary
| 1 | MIN | Hugh McElhenny 81 yard punt return (Mike Mercer kick) | MIN 7–0 |
| 1 | MIN | Jerry Reichow 30 yard pass from Fran Tarkenton (Mike Mercer kick) | MIN 14–0 |
| 1 | CHI | Angelo Coia 62 yard pass from Bill Wade (Roger LeClerc kick) | MIN 14–7 |
| 2 | CHI | Willie Galimore 8 yard run (Roger LeClerc kick) | Tie 14–14 |
| 2 | CHI | Mike Ditka 2 yard pass from Bill Wade (Roger LeClerc kick) | CHI 21–14 |
| 2 | MIN | Jerry Reichow 11 yard pass from Fran Tarkenton (Mike Mercer kick) | Tie 21–21 |
| 3 | CHI | Angelo Coia 16 yard pass from Bill Wade (Roger LeClerc kick) | CHI 28–21 |
| 3 | CHI | Roger LeClerc 17 yard field goal | CHI 31–21 |
| 3 | CHI | Mike Ditka 30 yard pass from Bill Wade (Roger LeClerc kick) | CHI 38–21 |
| 3 | MIN | Gordie Smith 10 yard pass from Fran Tarkenton (Mike Mercer kick) | CHI 38–28 |
| 3 | CHI | Charlie Bivins 30 yard run (Roger LeClerc kick) | CHI 45–28 |
| 4 | MIN | Jerry Reichow 24 yard pass from Fran Tarkenton (Mike Mercer kick) | CHI 45–35 |
| 4 | CHI | Willie Galimore 60 yard run (Roger LeClerc kick) | CHI 52–35 |
