= 1961 St. Louis Cardinals (NFL) season =

American football team season

1961 St. Louis Cardinals season
- Owner: Violet Bidwill Wolfner
- Head coach: Pop Ivy (first 12 games); Chuck Drulis, Ray Prochaska, and Ray Willsey
- Home stadium: Busch Stadium

Results
- Record: 7–7
- Division place: 4th NFL Eastern
- Playoffs: Did not qualify

The 1961 St. Louis Cardinals season marked the team's 42nd year in the National Football League (NFL) and their second in St. Louis. The team improved on their previous year's 6–5–1 record, winning seven games. Despite the improvement, they finished fourth in the seven-team Eastern Conference and failed to qualify for the playoffs (NFL title game) for the thirteenth consecutive season. The Cardinals were led by fourth-year head coach Pop Ivy, who was replaced after a 5–7 start by the trio of Chuck Drulis, Ray Prochaska, and Ray Willsey.

This was the final season of ownership by Violet Bidwill Wolfner, who died in January 1962 at age 62.

== Offseason ==
=== NFL draft ===
1961 St. Louis Cardinals draft
Round	Pick	Player	Position	College	Notes
1	8	Ken Rice *	Tackle	Auburn	
2	22	Fred Arbanas *	Tight end	Michigan State	
Made roster * Made at least one Pro Bowl during career

=== Undrafted free agents ===
1961 undrafted free agents of note
Player	Position	College
Roger Kramer	Tackle	Kalamazoo

== Personnel ==
=== Staff / Coaches ===
1961 St. Louis Cardinals staff
Front office: Principal Owner - Violet Bidwill Wolfner; Managing Director - Walter Wolfner; Head coaches: Head Coach – Pop Ivy; Assistant Head Coach - Chuck Drulis; Assistant Head Coach - Ray Prochaska; Assistant Head Coach - Ray Willsey; Offensive coaches: Offensive Line – Ray Prochaska	Defensive coaches: Defensive Coordinator - Chuck Drulis; Defensive Backfield Coach - Ray Willsey

=== Roster ===
1961 St. Louis Cardinals roster
Quarterbacks (QB): 14 Sam Etcheverry; 3 Ralph Guglielmi; 12 Charley Johnson; Running backs (RB): 44 John David Crow; 22 Prentice Gautt; 20 Ken Hall; 31 Mal Hammack; 36 Frank Mestnik; Wide receivers (WR): 40 Bobby Joe Conrad; 37 Pat Fischer; 88 Sonny Randle; Tight ends (TE): 85 Taz Anderson	Offensive linemen (OL): 75 Ed Cook T; 50 Don Gillis C; 64 Ken Gray G; 68 Mike McGee G; 66 Ron McDole T; 78 Dale Memmelaar T; 74 Ken Panfil T; 79 Gerry Perry C/T/K; 65 Tom Redmond G; Defensive linemen (DL): 72 Frank Fuller DT; 80 Ed Henke DE; 70 Don Owens DT; 78 Luke Owens DE; 84 Joe Robb DE	Linebackers (LB): 51 Ted Bates OLB; 34 Bill Koman OLB; 33 Monte Lee OLB; 62 Dale Meinert MLB; Defensive backs (DB): 45 Joe Driskill CB/FS; 41 Jimmy Hill CB; 25 Jerry Norton SS/P; 24 Billy Stacy CB/WR; 49 Willie West CB; 8 Larry Wilson FS; Special teams (ST)	Reserve: 35 Joe Childress RB (IR); 61 Bob DeMarco C/G (Military); 55 Charley Ellzey C (IR); 73 Charley Granger T (IR); 86 Hugh McInnis TE (IR); 73 Ernie McMillan T (Military); -- Marion Rushing LB (Military); Rookies in italics

== Schedule ==
Week	Date	Opponent	Result	Record	Venue	Attendance
1	September 17	at **New York Giants**	**W** 21–10	1–0	Yankee Stadium	58,059
2	September 24	at **Cleveland Browns**	**L** 17–20	1–1	Cleveland Municipal Stadium	50,443
3	October 1	at **Philadelphia Eagles**	**W** 30–27	2–1	Franklin Field	59,399
4	October 8	**New York Giants**	**L** 9–24	2–2	Busch Stadium	23,713
5	October 15	**Philadelphia Eagles**	**L** 7–20	2–3	Busch Stadium	20,262
6	October 22	at **Washington Redskins**	**W** 24–0	3–3	D.C. Stadium	28,037
7	October 29	**Cleveland Browns**	**L** 10–21	3–4	Busch Stadium	26,696
8	November 5	at **Dallas Cowboys**	**W** 31–17	4–4	Cotton Bowl	20,500
9	November 12	Detroit Lions	**L** 14–45	4–5	Busch Stadium	20,320
10	November 19	at Baltimore Colts	**L** 0–16	4–6	Memorial Stadium	56,112
11	November 26	at **Pittsburgh Steelers**	**L** 27–30	4–7	Forbes Field	17,090
12	December 3	**Washington Redskins**	**W** 38–24	5–7	Busch Stadium	16,204
13	December 10	**Dallas Cowboys**	**W** 31–13	6–7	Busch Stadium	15,384
14	December 17	**Pittsburgh Steelers**	**W** 20–0	7–7	Busch Stadium	16,298
Note: Intra-conference opponents are in **bold** text.

== Game summaries ==
=== Week 1 at NY Giants ===
the Cardinals, supposedly crippled beyond repair, came roaring through with a fine display of offensive firepower to upset the New York Giants. The Cards razzle-dazzle offense was on display despite losing John David Crow and Joe Childress. But Sam Etcheverry, another cripple, cranked up Frank Ivy's offense and sent fullback Mal Hammack on a 28-yard touchdown run that overcame a 10-7 Giants lead, then fired a five-yard screen pass to another fullback Frank Mestnik, for another score. The Cards defense also was effective. The Giants' "new look" offense was badly frustrated and surrendered the first St. Louis Cardinals touchdown when halfback Bob Gaiters fumbled in the end zone and Willie West recovered for a touchdown. The Giants only scoring was a 44-yard field goal by Pat Summerall and a Larry Hayes return of a block punt for a touchdown.

== Standings ==
NFL Eastern Conference
	W	L	T	PCT	CONF	PF	PA	STK
New York Giants	10	3	1	.769	9–2–1	368	220	T1
Philadelphia Eagles	10	4	0	.714	8–4	361	297	W1
Cleveland Browns	8	5	1	.615	8–3–1	319	270	T1
St. Louis Cardinals	7	7	0	.500	7–5	279	267	W3
Pittsburgh Steelers	6	8	0	.429	5–7	295	287	L1
Dallas Cowboys	4	9	1	.308	2–9–1	236	380	L4
Washington Redskins	1	12	1	.077	1–10–1	174	392	W1

Note: Tie games were not officially counted in the standings until 1972.
