= 1961 Philadelphia Eagles season =

NFL team season

- Owner: Happy Hundred
- Head coach: Nick Skorich
- Home stadium: Franklin Field

Results
- Record: 10–4
- Division place: 2nd NFL Eastern
- Playoffs: Lost NFL Playoff Bowl (vs. Lions) 10–38
- Pro Bowlers: FB Ted Dean; RT J.D. Smith; RE Bobby Walston; FL Tommy McDonald; RLB Maxie Baughan; QB Sonny Jurgensen

The 1961 Philadelphia Eagles season was the franchise's twenty-ninth season in the National Football League. The team finished in second place with a record of 10 wins and 4 losses. The Eagles played in the NFL Playoff Bowl and lost vs the Detroit Lions 38–10.

== Off-season ==
Since 1951, the Eagles have held their training camp at Hersheypark Stadium in Hershey, Pennsylvania.

=== NFL draft ===
The 1961 NFL draft and the 1961 AFL draft were separate drafts, and players could end up being drafted by both leagues.

The 1961 NFL draft, which involved fourteen teams choosing college players during twenty rounds, took place on December 27 and 28, 1960. It occurred after the Eagles' win in the NFL Championship Game on December 26.

The Eagles picked last as a result of the team's 10–2 season record in 1960. This was due to the rule at that time that teams be assigned their respective ranks in the selection process based on their previous season records. This meant that the Cleveland Browns picked ahead of the NFL runner-up, the Green Bay Packers.

This draft was also the first regular draft for the Dallas Cowboys, which had participated only in the 1960 NFL expansion draft that year. The Cowboys held the worst record in the NFL the previous season, but selected second in this draft due to the entry of the Minnesota Vikings into the league. The league also held a later expansion draft for the Vikings' franchise, which was awarded the first selection position in that draft.

The AFL draft was held on two dates that were two weeks apart at the end of the 1960 college season. Conducted prior to the bowl games, the first was a six-round draft held by phone. The second was held on December 5 and 6, 1960 for rounds seven through thirty. The Denver Broncos selected New Mexico State's Bob Gaiters as the overall first draft pick.

The Philadelphia Eagles lost its first-round pick to the AFL for the second year. About half of the Eagles' nineteen picks either signed with the AFL or remained in college to play their last year of eligibility.

=== Player selections ===
= Pro Bowler	= AFL All-Star	= Hall of Famer

Rd	PICK	PLAYER	POS	SCHOOL	AFL	Rd	Pick	Signed
1	14	Art Baker	Fullback	Syracuse	Buffalo Bills _{from New York}	3rd		Buffalo
2	28	Bo Strange	Center	Louisiana State	Denver Broncos	3rd		
3	36	Jim Wright	Quarterback	Memphis State	New York	1		Dallas Texans
3	42	Don Oakes	Tackle	Virginia Tech	Boston Patriots	21	162	Eagles
4	53	Dan Ficca	Guard	USC	San Diego	29	162	Oakland Raiders
4	56	_{Pick taken by Green Bay}						
5	70	_{Pick taken by Detroit Lions}						
6	84	Ben Balme	Guard	Yale				
7	98	Irv Cross	Back	Northwestern	New York	15	117	Eagles
8	112	Jim Beaver	Guard	Florida				
9	126	Wayne Fontes	Running back	Michigan State	New York	22	173	New York Titans
10	140	Luther Hayes	End	USC	San Diego	27	215	San Diego Chargers
11	154	L.E. Hicks	Tackle	Florida				
12	168	Billy Majors	Back	Tennessee	Buffalo Bills	9	67	Buffalo
13	182	Don Jonas	Quarterback	Penn State				Eagles _{1962 season then career in CFL}
14	196	Willie Fleming	Running back	Iowa				_{signed with}BC Lions_{of CFL in 1959}
15	210	Bobby Richards	Tackle	Louisiana State				Eagles _{1962 season}
16	224	G. W. Clapp	Guard	Auburn				
17	238	Larry Lavery	Tackle	Illinois				
18	252	Nick Maravich	Tackle	North Carolina State				
19	266	Dick Wilson	Center	Penn State				
20	280	Jacque MacKinnon	Back	Colgate				

== Preseason ==
- August 4, Chicago All-Star Game: Eagles 28, All-Stars 14

== Regular season ==
=== Schedule ===
Week	Date	Opponent	Result	Record	Venue	Attendance	Recap	Sources
1	September 17	**Cleveland Browns**	**W** 27–20	1–0	Franklin Field	60,671	Recap	
2	September 24	**Washington Redskins**	**W** 14–7	2–0	Franklin Field	50,108	Recap	
3	October 1	**St. Louis Cardinals**	**L** 27–30	2–1	Franklin Field	59,399	Recap	
4	October 8	**Pittsburgh Steelers**	**W** 21–16	3–1	Franklin Field	60,671	Recap	
5	October 15	at **St. Louis Cardinals**	**W** 20–7	4–1	Busch Stadium	20,262	Recap	
6	October 22	at **Dallas Cowboys**	**W** 43–7	5–1	Cotton Bowl	25,000	Recap	
7	October 29	at **Washington Redskins**	**W** 27–24	6–1	D.C. Stadium	31,066	Recap	
8	November 5	Chicago Bears	**W** 16–14	7–1	Franklin Field	60,671	Recap	
9	November 12	at **New York Giants**	**L** 21–38	7–2	Yankee Stadium	62,800	Recap	
10	November 19	at **Cleveland Browns**	**L** 24–45	7–3	Cleveland Municipal Stadium	68,399	Recap	
11	November 26	**Dallas Cowboys**	**W** 35–13	8–3	Franklin Field	60,127	Recap	
12	December 3	at **Pittsburgh Steelers**	**W** 35–24	9–3	Forbes Field	21,653	Recap	
13	December 10	**New York Giants**	**L** 24–28	9–4	Franklin Field	60,671	Recap	
14	December 17	at Detroit Lions	**W** 27–24	10–4	Tiger Stadium	44,231	Recap	
Note: Intra-division opponents are in **bold** text.

=== Standings ===
Program for the October 1 home contest against the St. Louis Cardinals.

NFL Eastern Conference
	W	L	T	PCT	CONF	PF	PA	STK
New York Giants	10	3	1	.769	9–2–1	368	220	T1
Philadelphia Eagles	10	4	0	.714	8–4	361	297	W1
Cleveland Browns	8	5	1	.615	8–3–1	319	270	T1
St. Louis Cardinals	7	7	0	.500	7–5	279	267	W3
Pittsburgh Steelers	6	8	0	.429	5–7	295	287	L1
Dallas Cowboys	4	9	1	.308	2–9–1	236	380	L4
Washington Redskins	1	12	1	.077	1–10–1	174	392	W1

Note: Tie games were not officially counted in the standings until 1972.

== Playoff Bowl ==
Round	Date	Opponent	Result	Venue	Attendance	Recap	Sources
Playoff Bowl	January 6, 1962	Detroit Lions	L 10–38	Orange Bowl	25,612		

== Roster ==
1961 Philadelphia Eagles roster
Quarterbacks (QB): 9 Sonny Jurgensen; 10 King Hill; Running backs (RB): 33 Billy Ray Barnes; 22 Timmy Brown; 35 Ted Dean; 26 Clarence Peaks; 30 Theron Sapp; Wide receivers (WR): 25 Tommy McDonald; 44 Pete Retzlaff; Tight ends (TE): 87 Dick Lucas; 80 John Tracey; 83 Bobby Walston K	Offensive linemen (OL): 60 Chuck Bednarik C/MLB; 67 Stan Campbell G; 79 Gene Gossage G; 61 Howard Keys C; 75 Jim McCusker T; 77 Don Oakes T; 76 J. D. Smith T; 62 John Wittenborn G; Defensive linemen (DL): 78 Marion Campbell DE; 74 Riley Gunnels DT; 73 Ed Khayat DT; 66 Will Renfro DE; 72 Jess Richardson DT; 84 Leo Sugar DE	Linebackers (LB): 55 Maxie Baughan OLB; 29 John Nocera OLB; 53 Bob Pellegrini OLB; 51 Chuck Weber MLB; Defensive backs (DB): 46 Glen Amerson CB/FS; 45 Don Burroughs FS; 21 Jimmy Carr CB; 27 Irv Cross CB; 41 Bobby Freeman SS; 23 Carl Taseff CB; Special teams (ST)	Reserve: 40 Tom Brookshier CB (IR); Rookies in italics
