= Tommy Davis (kicker) =

American football player (1934–1987)

- Davis in 1961

No. 36
- Positions: Kicker, punter

Personal information
- Born: October 13, 1934; Shreveport, Louisiana, U.S.
- Died: April 2, 1987 (aged 52); Millbrae, California, U.S.
- Listed height: 6 ft 0 in (1.83 m)
- Listed weight: 215 lb (98 kg)

Career information
- High school: Fair Park (LA)
- College: LSU
- NFL draft: 1957: 11th round, 128th overall pick

Career history
- San Francisco 49ers (1959–1969)

Awards and highlights
- Second-team All-Pro (1965); 2× Pro Bowl (1962, 1963); National champion (1958)

Career NFL statistics
- Games played: 138
- Punt yards: 22,833
- Longest punt: 82
- Field goals made: 130
- Stats at Pro Football Reference

Tommy Ray Davis (October 13, 1934 – April 2, 1987) was an American professional football punter and kicker for the San Francisco 49ers of the National Football League (NFL).

== College career ==
Davis was a member of the national championship winning 1958 LSU Tigers football team.

== Professional career ==
He played from 1959 to 1969 for the San Francisco 49ers. He was selected to the Pro Bowl after the 1962 and 1963 seasons, and was a second-team All-Pro in 1965.

Davis scored 738 points in his 10 year career, of which 348 were extra points. He missed only two extra points in his career. However, he had the unfortunate accolade of being the least accurate kicker in NFL history (for kickers who kicked for at least 100 attempts), only making 130 field goals out of 276 attempts for 47.1% accuracy. He also punted for an overall 22,833 yards.

== Personal life ==
Davis died of lung cancer on April 2, 1987, in San Bruno, California. He was 52 years old at the time of his death.
