= Alley-oop =

Offensive play in basketball

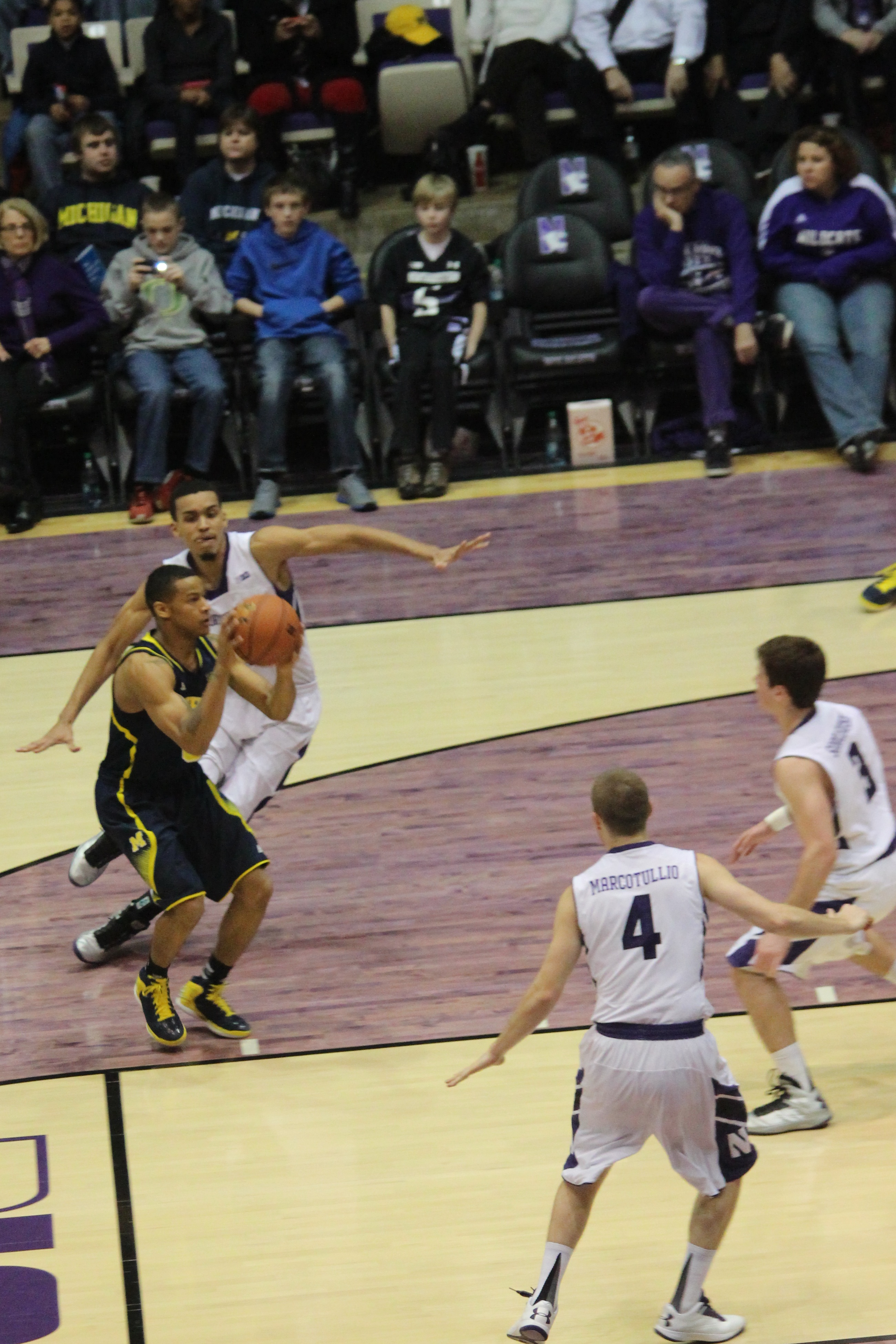
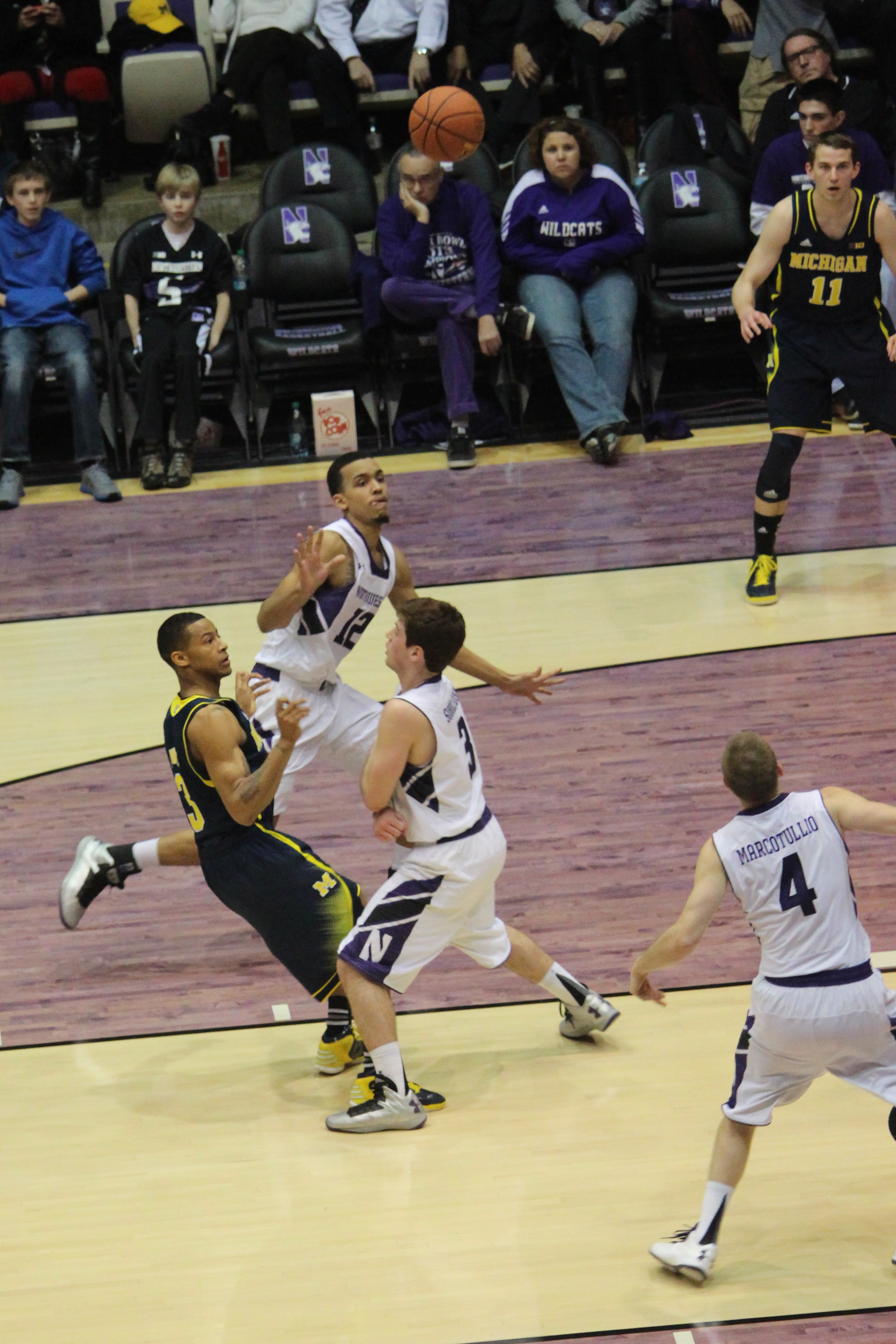
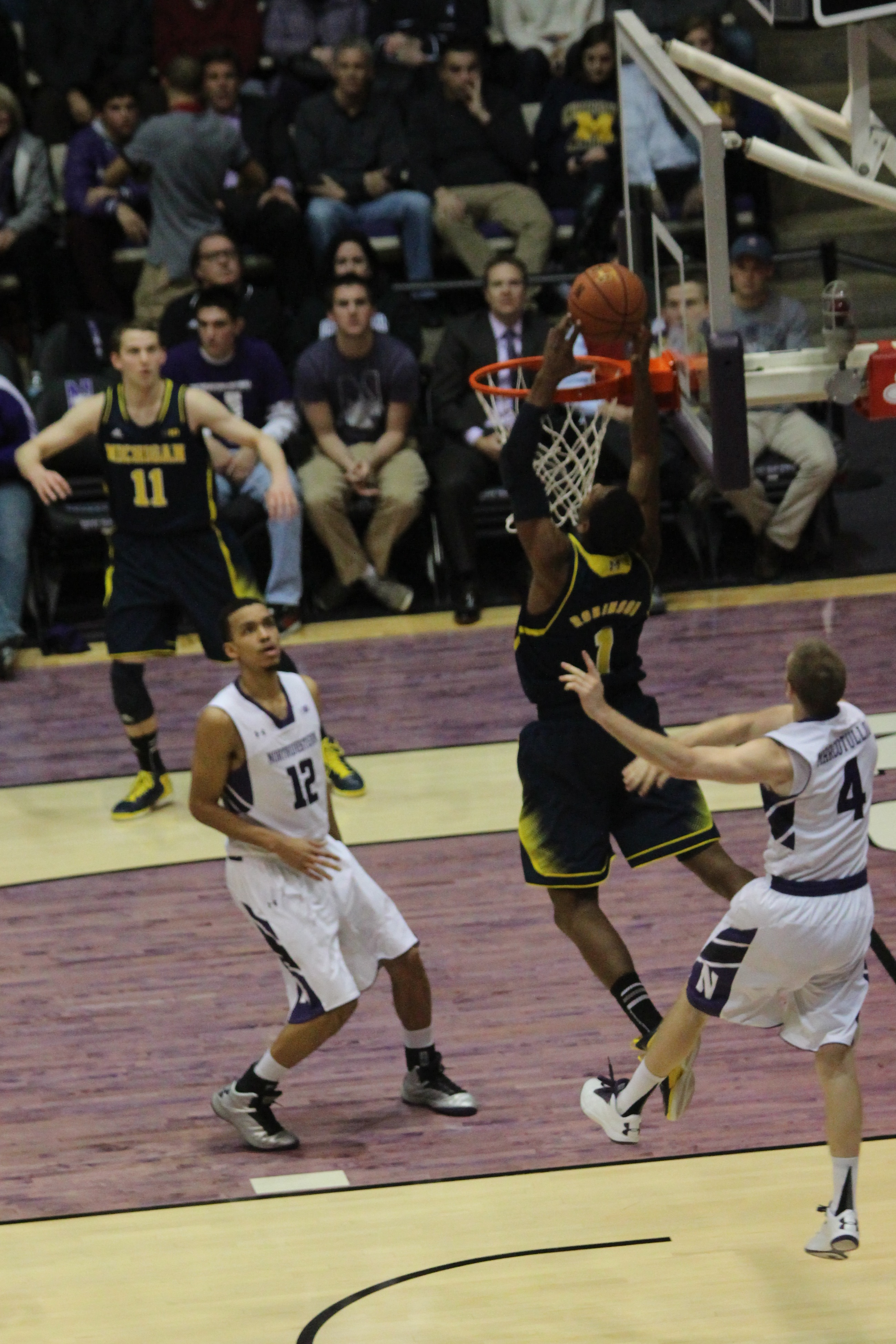
Trey Burke sets up an alley-oop to Glenn Robinson III for Michigan during its 2012–13 Big Ten Conference season opener on January 3 against Northwestern.

In basketball, an alley-oop, also known as a lob, is an offensive play in which one player passes the ball near the basket to a teammate who jumps, catches the ball in mid-air and dunks or lays it in before touching the ground.

The alley-oop combines elements of teamwork, pinpoint passing, timing and finishing.

== Etymology ==
The term "alley-oop" is derived from the French term allez hop!, the cry of a circus acrobat about to leap.

The term “Alley Oop” was first popularized in the United States in 1932 as the name of a syndicated comic strip created by cartoonist V. T. Hamlin.

In sports, the term "alley-oop" first appeared in the 1950s by the San Francisco 49ers of the NFL to describe a high arcing pass from quarterback Y. A. Tittle to wide receiver R.C. Owens, who would outleap smaller cornerbacks for touchdown receptions. "The Catch", the Dwight Clark touchdown reception from Joe Montana by which the 49ers gained entry into their first Super Bowl, was also an "alley-oop" pass. The term later became better known from its use in basketball.

== History ==
In the 1950s, some players began grabbing balls in mid-air and then dunking. K. C. Jones and Bill Russell teamed up to perform the alley-oop several times while at the University of San Francisco in the mid-1950s.

In addition, Bill Russell, Wilt Chamberlain at the University of Kansas and 'Jumping' Johnny Green at Michigan State University would frequently grab errant shots by teammates and dunk them. This resulted in a tightening in the enforcement of offensive goaltending rules in NCAA and NBA basketball in the late 1950s.

The Phillips 66ers, an Oklahoma AAU team, had an alley-oop play in its playbook where Charlie Bowerman would pass the ball to Don Kojis. Before his 12-year NBA career, Kojis played two seasons for the 66ers from 1961 to 1963, making that the time period when the play was executed. At the time, the play between Bowerman and Kojis was known as the "Kangaroo Kram" and became a regular play they used in games. The Kangaroo Kram, with Bowerman passing and Kojis catching and slam dunking, was described in the local Oklahoma press in late December 1961: "It's like trying to describe a spiral staircase without using your hands, but the pass is lobbed to the side of the basket, and with perfect timing Kojis dives in, grabs the ball with both hands and stuffs its down the net . . . at full speed".

Al Tucker and his brother Gerald at Oklahoma Baptist University are sometimes mistakenly credited with being the first to use the alley-oop in the mid-60s. In Bill Walton's record-setting 44-point, 21-for-22 shooting performance for UCLA in the 1973 NCAA championship game against Memphis State, six of his baskets came on alley-oop plays.

Some others credit David Thompson as the first player to execute the classic alley-oop play while at North Carolina State University, with his teammates Monte Towe and Tim Stoddard performing the necessary lob passes. NCSU's Thompson popularized the play during the early 1970s, exploiting his 44-inch vertical leap to make the above-the-rim play a recurring staple in the Wolfpack's offensive attack. Because dunking was illegal in college basketball at that time, upon catching the pass, Thompson would simply drop the ball through the hoop – never dunking one until the final play of the final home game of his career.

After a decade of dunking prohibition ended in the NCAA in 1976, the alley-oop became associated in the late 1970s with Michigan State's Earvin 'Magic' Johnson and Greg Kelser. The duo connected for many highlight alley-oops and would showcase the play in their 1979 national championship run, including the most watched game in the history of the sport, the famed Magic vs. Bird championship game. Three years later, unheralded Idaho made the alley-oop an integral part of their undersized offense in 1982, ended the regular season eighth in both major polls at 26–2, and advanced to the Sweet Sixteen.

The following year, North Carolina State also won the national championship on what could be considered the most famous alley-oop of all time against heavily favored Houston in the 1983 championship game at The Pit in Albuquerque, New Mexico. With time running out and the score tied, guard Dereck Whittenburg shot short of the rim, which effectively functioned as a pass to Lorenzo Charles, who caught the ball and stuffed it through the net to win the title in a huge upset.

During the 1990s, NBA stars turned the alley-oop into the game's ultimate quick-strike weapon. In recent years, teams have often run the alley-oop as a planned play. The 2008 National Champions Kansas Jayhawks had several designs for alley-oops, including some thrown from inbound sets, and could execute them interchangeably with almost all of the players being able to both lob and finish the play.

== In popular culture ==
In the 2008 film Semi-Pro, the protagonist invents the alley-oop after being knocked unconscious and speaking with his deceased mother in a depiction of Heaven.

In the song “Basketball” for the 2002 film Like Mike, Lil Bow Wow raps “My favorite play is the alley-oop.”

== See also ==
- Alley-oop (American football), the original usage of the term in sports
- NBA records
