= Stokeley Fulton =

American athlete, coach, and administrator (1929–1985)

- Fulton pictured in Kaleidoscope 1972, Hampden–Sydney yearbook

Biographical details
- Born: October 24, 1929; Brosville, Virginia, U.S.
- Died: July 13, 1985 (aged 55); Farmville, Virginia, U.S.

Playing career
- 1950–1951: Tennessee
- 1952–1955: Hampden–Sydney
- Position: Center (football/baseball)

Coaching career (HC unless noted)

Football
- 1957–1959: Hampden–Sydney (assistant)
- 1960–1984: Hampden–Sydney

Baseball
- 1958–1959: Hampden–Sydney (assistant)
- 1967–1985: Hampden–Sydney

Tennis
- 1958–1964: Hampden–Sydney

Wrestling
- 1959–1962: Hampden–Sydney

Administrative career (AD unless noted)
- 1971–1980: Hampden–Sydney

Head coaching record
- Overall: 143–99–5 (football); 209–244–2 (baseball); 52–28 (tennis) (Note: The 1958 tennis records are omitted because the results can not be found.)
- Bowls: 0–2
- Tournaments: 0–1 (NCAA Division III)

Accomplishments and honors

Championships
- Football; 7 Mason–Dixon (1957, 1964, 1966, 1970–73); 3 ODAC (1977, 1982, 1983); Tennis; 2 Mason–Dixon (1962, 1963); Baseball; 4 Mason–Dixon (1958, 1959, 1970, 1971)

Awards
- As a player: First-team Little All-American (1954); As a coach: 3× ODAC Coach of the Year (1977, 1982, 1983); AFCA Small College Coach of the Year (1977); Virginia Sports Hall of Fame (1977)

John Stokeley Fulton (October 24, 1929 – July 13, 1985) was an American college football, baseball, tennis, and wrestling coach for Hampden–Sydney College. He was also the school's head athletic director.

Coach Fulton in Death Valley, 1972.

== Biography ==
Born on October 24, 1929, in Brosville, Virginia, John Stokeley Fulton grew up in Danville, Virginia. He attended George Washington High School and went on to the University of Tennessee to play football. After one year, Fulton transferred to Hampden–Sydney College. At Hampden–Sydney, Fulton stood out at both baseball and football – he was captain of both teams by his senior year and was named an all-conference player in football each year that he played. Fulton was also named a Little All-American in 1953.

Fulton was a brother and president of Pi Kappa Alpha, and admitted to Omicron Delta Kappa, the National Honorary Leadership Society. His senior year, Fulton was student body president.

Subsequent to graduating in 1955, Fulton enlisted in the U.S. Coast Guard for two years. By 1957, Fulton returned to Hampden–Sydney where he was hired as a line coach for the Tigers' football team. That year, the Tigers won the conference. His second year working for Hampden–Sydney, Fulton was hired as an assistant for the baseball team. His teams won the conference the two years that he was an assistant baseball coach. Fulton also took over the reins of tennis coach in 1958 and created the first Hampden–Sydney wrestling team in 1959. Fulton's coaching prowess shined quickly in tennis – by 1963 his teams had won 2 conference championships.

In 1967, Fulton became head coach of the Tigers' baseball team. As the head of the squad, he won 2 Mason–Dixon Conference championships in 1970 and 1971.

Fulton is best remembered for his coaching dexterity in football. In 1960, he was hired as head football coach – a position he held for the next 25 years. Fulton would go on to win 9 conference championships as the head coach of the Tigers' football team. To this day, he has the second most wins as a football head coach at Hampden–Sydney (143–99–5) and is the longest tenured head coach with 25 seasons. Fulton's teams went to back-to-back Knute Rockne Bowls in 1970 and 1971, and made the D–III quarterfinals in 1977 following an undefeated regular season.

Fulton brought Tigers' football to national attention in both 1976 and 1980. In 1976, his squad was host to a premier telecast on ABC against the undefeated and number one-ranked James Madison Dukes. The Tigers won the game, snapping the Dukes' 14–game winning streak, and pushing the Tigers to a 3rd overall national ranking. Similarly, in 1980, the Tigers were again host to a nationally televised game on ABC against Salisbury State, in which they lost 28–13.

Fulton was a member of the American Football Coaches Association, served on the NCAA rules committee for baseball, and was the College's Athletic Director from 1971 to 1980. At the time of his retirement, Fulton placed eighth all-time in wins among active Division III coaches. In one of his last official appearances at Hampden–Sydney, coach Fulton was honored at the 1985 College commencement ceremonies, receiving the senior class award and concomitant commendation from commencement speaker Vice President George H. W. Bush.

== Death ==
Fulton ceased coaching midway through the 1985 baseball season at Hampden–Sydney, relinquishing the head coaching duties to his nephew, Frank Fulton. Several months later he succumbed to cancer on July 13, 1985.

== Head coaching record ==
=== Football ===
Year	Team	Overall	Conference	Standing	Bowl/playoffs
Hampden–Sydney (Mason–Dixon Conference) (1960–1974)
1960	Hampden–Sydney	2–6	2–1	3rd	
1961	Hampden–Sydney	3–6	2–2	2nd	
1962	Hampden–Sydney	6–4	3–1	2nd	
1963	Hampden–Sydney	6–3	2–1	2nd	
1964	Hampden–Sydney	6–4	3–0	1st	
1965	Hampden–Sydney	6–3	3–1	2nd	
1966	Hampden–Sydney	5–4–1	5–0	1st	
1967	Hampden–Sydney	5–5	3–1	2nd	
1968	Hampden–Sydney	3–5–2	1–3	T–5th	
1969	Hampden–Sydney	6–4	3–1	2nd	
1970	Hampden–Sydney	9–2	4–0	1st	L Knute Rockne
1971	Hampden–Sydney	10–1	4–0	1st	L Knute Rockne
1972	Hampden–Sydney	8–2	3–1	1st	
1973	Hampden–Sydney	7–3	3–1	1st	
1974	Hampden–Sydney	6–4	2–2	3rd	
Hampden–Sydney (Virginia College Athletic Association) (1975)
1975	Hampden–Sydney	7–2	4–1	3rd	
Hampden–Sydney (Old Dominion Athletic Conference) (1976–1984)
1976	Hampden–Sydney	7–4	3–1	T–1st	
1977	Hampden–Sydney	9–2	4–0	1st	L NCAA Division III Quarterfinal
1978	Hampden–Sydney	5–5	2–2	T–2nd	
1979	Hampden–Sydney	4–6	2–2	T–2nd	
1980	Hampden–Sydney	3–7	2–3	T–3rd	
1981	Hampden–Sydney	2–7–1	2–2–1	3rd	
1982	Hampden–Sydney	4–4–1	4–1	1st	
1983	Hampden-Sydney	6–4	5–1	1st	
1984	Hampden–Sydney	8–2	3–2	T–2nd	
Hampden–Sydney:		143–99–5	74–30–1		
Total:		143–99–5			
National championship Conference title Conference division title or championship game berth

=== Baseball ===
Record table
Season	Team	Overall	Conference	Standing	Postseason
Hampden–Sydney (Mason–Dixon Conference) (1967–1975 (Note: Hampden–Sydney's Athletics' website lists coach Fulton as beginning his head coaching career in baseball in 1965. The H–SC y earbooks and The Record site his first year as 1967. This page uses 1967 as the starting year.))
1967	Hampden–Sydney	7–7			
1968	Hampden–Sydney	9–9			
1969	Hampden–Sydney	9–12			
1970	Hampden–Sydney	23–4	1st	1st	
1971	Hampden–Sydney	17–7	1st	1st	
1972	Hampden–Sydney	12–9			
1973	Hampden–Sydney	9–9			
1974	Hampden–Sydney	7–18			
1975	Hampden–Sydney	7–16			
Hampden–Sydney Tigers (Old Dominion Athletic Conference) (1976–1985)
1976	Hampden–Sydney	13–14			
1977	Hampden–Sydney	14–17			
1978	Hampden–Sydney	14–11			
1979	Hampden–Sydney	12–20			
1980	Hampden–Sydney	8–14			
1981	Hampden–Sydney	8–17			
1982	Hampden–Sydney	12–14			
1983	Hampden–Sydney	9–16			
1984	Hampden–Sydney	8–23			
1985	Hampden–Sydney	11–7			
Total:		209–244–2 (Note: Hampden–Sydney's Athletics' website lists different records for 1973 and 1974. The records provided here were pulled from The Kaleidoscope - the Hampden–Sydney yearbook.)			
National champion Postseason invitational champion Conference regular season champion Conference regular season and conference tournament champion Division regular season champion Division regular season and conference tournament champion Conference tournament champion

=== Tennis ===
Record table
Season	Team	Overall	Conference	Standing	Postseason
Hampden–Sydney Tigers (Mason–Dixon Conference) (1958–1964)
1958	Hampden–Sydney	Unknown			
1959	Hampden–Sydney	3–7			
1960	Hampden–Sydney	10–4			
1961	Hampden–Sydney	7–6			
1962	Hampden–Sydney	13–0		1st	
1963	Hampden–Sydney	12–3		1st	
1964	Hampden–Sydney	7–8			
Hampden–Sydney:		52–28			
Total:		52–28			
National champion Postseason invitational champion Conference regular season champion Conference regular season and conference tournament champion Division regular season champion Division regular season and conference tournament champion Conference tournament champion
