= Lions–Vikings rivalry =

National Football League rivalry

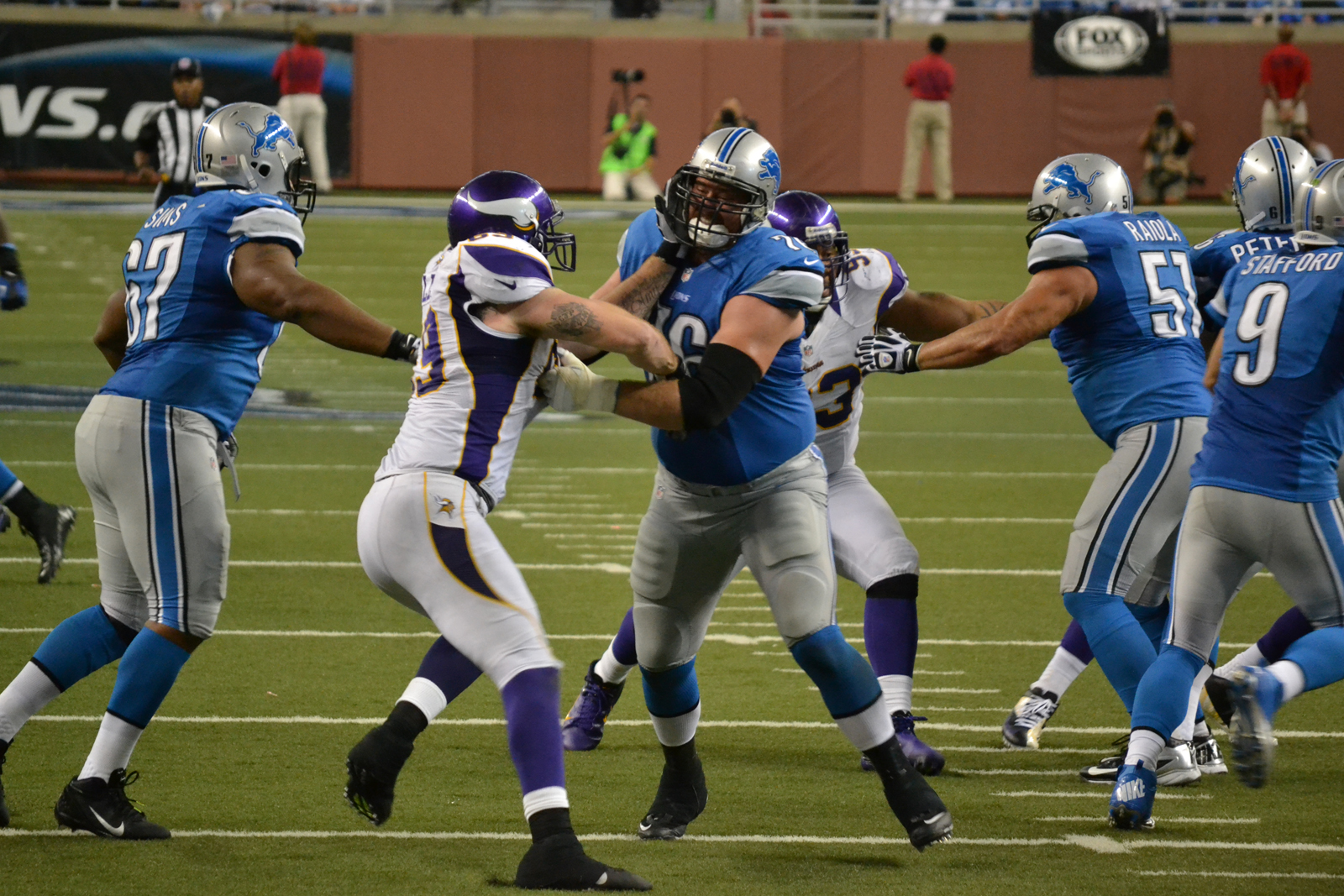
- Lions and Vikings face off during the 2012 season.

- Detroit Lions Minnesota Vikings
- Location: Detroit, Minneapolis
- First meeting: November 19, 1961; Lions 37, Vikings 10
- Latest meeting: November 1, 2026; Lions 19, Vikings 15
- Next meeting: December 20, 2026
- Stadiums: Lions: Ford Field; Vikings: U.S. Bank Stadium

Statistics
- Total meetings: 130
- All-time series: Vikings: 82–46–2
- Largest victory: Lions: 45–7 (1981); Vikings: 34–0 (1980)
- Most points scored: Lions: 45 (1978), (1981); Vikings: 44 (1988)
- Longest win streak: Lions: 5 (1961–1963, 2022–2024); Vikings: 13 (1968–1974)
- Current win streak: Lions: 1 (2026–present)
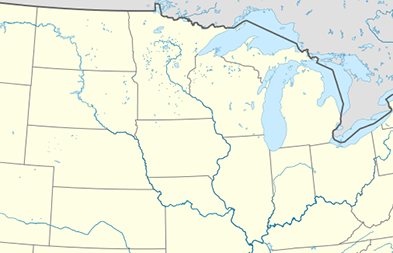

The Lions–Vikings rivalry is a National Football League (NFL) rivalry between the Detroit Lions and Minnesota Vikings.

The Vikings entered the NFL as an expansion team during the 1961 season and were assigned to the Western Division, becoming divisional rivals with the Lions. Following the AFL-NFL merger in 1970, both teams transitioned to the NFC Central, which was later renamed the NFC North after the NFL's realignment in 2002. While the two teams initially maintained a closely contested rivalry, the Vikings dominated in the 1970s, taking a big lead over the Lions.

The Vikings have outperformed the Lions since the inception of their rivalry and the most one-sided decades occurred during the 1970s and 2000s, where the Vikings went 35–5 against the Lions. Based on winning percentage, it is one of the most lopsided divisional rivalries in the NFL.

The Vikings lead the overall series, 82–46–2. The two teams have not met in the playoffs.

== Background ==
=== Detroit Lions (1930–1960) ===
The Lions were founded in 1930 as the Portsmouth Spartans, located in Portsmouth, Ohio. Due to financial troubles, the team was purchased by George A. Richards, who relocated them to Detroit for the 1934 season and renamed them as the Detroit Lions. The team won its first championship in 1935, but it would subsequently endure decades of mediocrity, failing to qualify for the playoffs since then. By the 1952 season, the Lions experienced a turnaround in their fortunes, being led by Hall-of-Fame quarterback Bobby Layne and head coaches Buddy Parker and George Wilson. During the 1950s, the Lions appeared in four NFL championship games, winning in three of them. During that same timeframe, the Lions were placed in the NFL National Conference following the AAFC–NFL merger, which would be renamed to the Western Conference in the 1953 season. The early 1960s saw the Lions win three consecutive Playoff Bowls, a post-season exhibition game to determine third place.

=== Minnesota Vikings ===
The Minnesota Vikings were founded in 1960 by a group of investors led by Max Winter, Bill Boyer, H. P. Skoglund, Ole Haugsrud and Bernard H. Ridder Jr and began playing in the 1961 season. They were placed in the Western Conference, becoming divisional rivals with the Detroit Lions and resulting in two meetings annually.

== 1961–1967: Beginning of annual meetings ==
The Lions and Vikings inaugural meeting between one another occurred on November 19, 1961 in Minnesota, which saw the Vikings score the first 10 points in the first quarter before being shut out by the Lions on route to a 37–10 Lions blowout win. On December 10, they would meet again in Detroit for the first time, where the Lions won 13–7, completing a sweep of the inaugural season series against the Vikings.

The Lions won their next three games against the Vikings, increasing their winning streak to five, one of their longest. It wasn't until the 1963 season that the Vikings defeated the Lions for the first time, winning 34–31 on November 24 in Minnesota.

In the 1964 season on October 11 in Minnesota, a miscommunication led to both the Lions and Vikings starting the game in identical white jerseys, marking the first and only time of two teams wearing the same color in an NFL game. At the start of the second quarter, the Vikings changed into their purple jerseys. The Lions would win the game 24–20.

Later that season on November 22 in Detroit, Lions' K Wayne Walker kicked a 37-yard field goal under less than a minute left to lead to the first tie result between the two teams.

In the 1965 season on December 12 in Detroit, Vikings beat the Lions 29–7 to record their first victory in Detroit.

In the 1966 season on November 13 in Minnesota, Lions K Garo Yepremian kicked 6 field goals, setting a then-NFL record, as he helped the Lions beat the Vikings 32–31. The record would be broken by K Jim Bakken in the 1967 season.

In the 1967 season, the NFL divided its teams into two eight-team conferences split into two divisions each. Consequently, the Lions and Vikings were placed in the Western Conference and the NFC Central, alongside the Chicago Bears and Green Bay Packers, thereby continuing their divisional rivalry.

Later that season on November 12 in Minnesota, the Lions fumbled 11 times in a 10–10 tie against the Vikings, setting an NFL record.

== 1968–1985: Bud Grant era, Vikings dominate ==
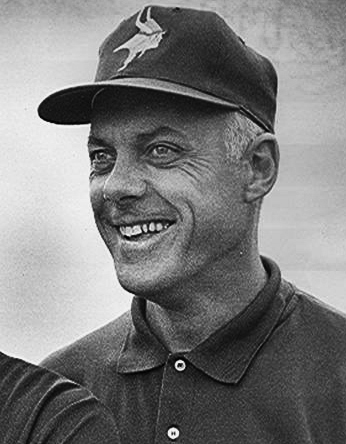
Vikings HC Bud Grant was dominant against the Lions, compiling a 26–8–1 record in their matchups. This record included a thirteen-game winning streak and a home record of 15–2–1.

In the 1968 season, the Vikings recorded their first season series sweep against the Lions. This would help the Vikings to clinch their first playoff appearance and division title in franchise history.

Following their loss to the Vikings in Minnesota in the 1969 season, Lions players were forced to bathe in cold water, prompting Lions HC Joe Schmidt to remark that they would give the Vikings "an ice bath" in their next game. However, the Lions would be shut out 27–0 in their first Thanksgiving matchup against the Vikings.

As a result of the AFL–NFL merger in the 1970 NFL season, the Lions and Vikings were placed in the newly created National Football Conference (NFC) and the NFC Central (later renamed to the NFC North in the 2002 season) alongside the Green Bay Packers and Chicago Bears, continuing their divisional rivalry.

That season also saw both teams finishing with double-digit wins and qualifying for the playoffs for the first time in the same year. Despite that, the Vikings swept the Lions, a result that would ultimately lead to them clinching the NFC Central title.

From 1968 to 1974, the Vikings went on a 13-game winning streak against the Lions, the longest win streak in the rivalry. The streak included blowout victories, overcoming a 13–0 deficit, and a game-winning block by DB Bobby Bryant on Errol Mann's 33-yard field goal attempt in the game's final play. The Vikings also took the overall series lead with their win in the 1971 season, a lead that they have yet to relinquish.

It was not until October 20, 1974, in Minnesota that the Lions defeated the Vikings 20–16 to snap their 13-game losing streak. Additionally, the Lions would also snap their 7-game losing streak at home against the Vikings in 1975.

In the Detroit meeting in the 1976 season, the Vikings arrived 5 minutes prior to the scheduled kickoff time, resulting in a half-hour delay for the game to start. The Vikings would be fined $5,000 (equivalent to $29,608.08 in 2026). Despite the setback, the Vikings held on to a 10–9 victory after Lions Holder Joe Reed mishandled a snap, and Errol Mann's attempt for an extra point was missed following a late touchdown by the Lions.

Later that season in their meeting at Minnesota, Vikings rookie WR Sammy Write set a Minnesota single-game receiving record with 210 receiving yards, contributing to the Vikings' victory over the Lions. The record would be surpassed by WR Justin Jefferson in a 2022 season game, coincidentally against the Lions.

In the 1978 season on December 9 in Detroit, the Lions put together one of their most dominating wins against the Vikings. They beat the Vikings 45–14, their most points scored in a game against the Vikings. Lions QB Gary Danielson finished with 5 passing touchdowns, becoming the first Lions quarterback to throw for five touchdowns in a game.

In the 1980 season, the Lions beat the Vikings in Detroit and improved to a 4–0 record, one of their best starts in franchise history. However, the Vikings got their revenge in Minnesota, where they shutout the Lions 34–0 to record the first shutout in the series. The Vikings defense sacked Gary Danielson seven times and forced eight Lions turnovers. The final score, 34–0, is also the Vikings' largest victory against the Lions with a 34–point differential. Despite a strong start from the Lions and a poor start for the Vikings, both teams finished the season with 9–7 records. However, the Vikings had the better conference record than the Lions, allowing them to clinch the NFC Central, their 11th in 13 years, while also eliminating the Lions from playoff contention.

In the 1981 season, the Vikings won the first meeting in Minnesota, when K Rick Danmeier kicked the game-winning 20-yard field goal with four seconds left. However, in the meeting in Detroit, the Lions exacted revenge where they recorded one of their most dominating victories against the Vikings, winning 45–7. They recorded their largest victory over the Vikings with a 38–point differential and tied their most points scored in a game against the Vikings since the 1978 game.

Due to the 1982 NFL Players strike, the game scheduled in Minnesota was canceled, making this the only season in which the Lions and Vikings did not face each other at least twice in the regular season.

Despite losing the first meeting in 1983, the Lions won the second matchup against the Vikings, a victory that helped them clinch the NFC Central Division title, their first division championship since the 1957 season. Meanwhile, the Vikings, who started the season 6–2, missed the playoffs after finishing 2–6 in their final eight games.

In the 1984 season on October 21 at Minnesota, Lions RB Billy Sims suffered a catastrophic injury to his right knee. During the game, he became the franchise's all-time leading rusher with 5,106 yards, a record later surpassed by Barry Sanders. The injury ultimately ended Sims' career, as he never played again and officially retired in 1986.

The 1985 season marked Bud Grant’s final year as head coach of the Vikings. He finished his career with a 26–8–1 record against the Lions, which included a thirteen-game winning streak, the longest in the rivalry, and a 15–2–1 record at home.

== 1986–1990: Vikings continue their dominance ==
Even after Bud Grant's departure, the Vikings continued to make playoff appearances and maintained a strong record against the Lions. This was particularly evident during the 1988 season. In their November 6 matchup in Minnesota, the Vikings defeated the Lions 44–17, their most points scored in a game against the Lions. Later that season, during their Thanksgiving Day game in Detroit, the Vikings shut out the Lions 23–0. The Lions managed only 60 total yards in the game, setting a franchise record for the fewest total yards in a single game. They also finished with 3 first downs, tying a franchise record. Meanwhile, the Vikings tied a franchise record for the fewest yards allowed in a game and set a franchise record for fewest first downs allowed with 3. By the end of the decade, the Vikings had a 7-game winning streak over the Lions.

== 1991–1999: Lions and Vikings compete for playoffs ==
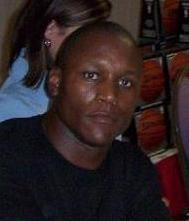
In their first matchup of the 1991 season, Lions running back Barry Sanders (pictured) rushed for a touchdown with 43 seconds remaining, completing a comeback from a 20–3 fourth-quarter deficit to secure the win. In their second meeting, Sanders rushed for 220 yards and four touchdowns, both franchise records, as he led the Lions to their first season sweep of the Vikings since the 1962 season.

Both teams were strong contenders in the 1990s, regularly vying for playoff spots and the NFC Central division title.

During the 1991 NFL season, the Lions hosted the Vikings in a memorable matchup in which the Lions overcame a 20–3 fourth quarter deficit. After a Vikings field goal extended their lead to 20–3 with 8:38 remaining, the Lions mounted a dramatic comeback. RB Barry Sanders scored the game-winning touchdown on a 15-yard run, securing a 24–20 victory for Detroit. Sanders finished the game with 116 rushing yards on 25 carries, his fourth consecutive 100-yard performance, and added 9 receptions for 76 receiving yards.

In their next meeting that season, held in Minnesota, the Lions delivered one of their strongest performances against the Vikings. The Lions' defense intercepted QB Rich Gannon three times and recorded six sacks. On offense, Barry Sanders had one of the most outstanding games of his career, rushing for 220 yards and four touchdowns as he led the Lions to a 34–14 victory. The 220 rushing yards set a franchise record for the most in a single game by a player, a mark Sanders would later surpass himself in 1994. His four rushing touchdowns also set a franchise record for the most in a single game by a player, a record that still stands. The victory completed a season sweep of the Vikings for the first time since the 1962 season, ending a 29-year drought.

The Vikings would get their revenge in 1994, holding Sanders to just 16 yards on 12 carries, one of the worst performances of his career, in a 10–3 Minnesota victory.

In their next meeting, the Lions dominated the Vikings with a 41–19 victory, securing consecutive winning seasons for the first time since 1972–1973. One bright spot for Minnesota came when wide receiver Cris Carter set a new NFL record for most receptions in a single season, a record that would be broken the following year by Herman Moore, a Lions player.

In the 1995 season matchup in Minnesota, Vikings kicker Fuad Reveiz set an NFL record by making his 30th consecutive field goal, surpassing the previous mark of 29 set by San Diego Chargers's John Carney in the 1992–93 seasons. The Vikings also successfully limited Sanders once again, holding him to just 35 yards on 13 carries.

In their Thanksgiving matchup in Detroit, the two teams played the highest-scoring game in the history of the rivalry. The Lions defeated the Vikings 44–38 in a game that featured ten touchdowns and a combined 919 yards of total offense. Lions quarterback Scott Mitchell threw for 410 yards, setting a franchise record for most passing yards in a single game, a record that would later be broken in 2001.

In the 1997 season, the Lions defeated the Vikings 38–15 in Detroit, ending the Vikings’ six-game winning streak. In their rematch in Minnesota, Lions wide receiver Herman Moore caught a 1-yard alley-oop touchdown pass with three seconds remaining on the game's final play to secure a 14–13 victory and a season sweep of the Vikings. The loss marked the beginning of a late-season collapse for Minnesota, who had started the year 8–2 but went on to lose five straight games, beginning with the defeat in Detroit.

In the 1999 season, Lions kicker Jason Hanson made six field goals, including a 48-yarder with seven seconds remaining, to give the Lions a 25–23 victory over the Vikings. Hanson tied the franchise record for most field goals made in a single game, originally set by Garo Yepremian in a 1966 game, also against Minnesota. The Vikings, who had trailed 19–0 at halftime, rallied to take a 23–22 lead on Gary Anderson’s 26-yard field goal with 1:40 remaining, but it ultimately wasn’t enough.

In the 2000 season in Minnesota, the Vikings clinched a playoff berth with their victory over the Lions. In the same game, wide receiver Cris Carter became the second player in NFL history to record 1,000 career receptions.

== 2001-2009: Vikings dominate the decade ==
In the 2001 season, the Lions earned their first win of the year by defeating the Vikings at home. In their earlier meeting in Minnesota, the Lions nearly overcame a 31–6 deficit but ultimately lost 31–26. A similar situation nearly occurred in the rematch, as Detroit led 20–7 at halftime before the Vikings scored 17 unanswered points to take a 24–20 lead early in the fourth quarter. The Lions regained the lead on their next drive and held off Minnesota to secure a 27–24 victory, marking their first win of the season after starting 0–12.

The Vikings earned revenge in their 2002 season meeting in Minnesota, rallying in the fourth quarter and intercepting a Lions pass in the red zone on Detroit’s final drive to secure a 31–24 victory.

This win began a ten-game winning streak for the Vikings against the Lions, during which Minnesota did not lose to Detroit until the 2007 season. In that 2007 matchup at Ford Field, the Lions built a 17–7 lead before the Vikings rallied. A scoreless fourth quarter, in which both teams missed potential game-winning field goals, sent the game into overtime. The Vikings received the ball first, but a fumble by quarterback Brooks Bollinger led to a Lions game-winning 37-yard field goal, snapping their ten-game losing streak against Minnesota.

The Vikings’ 2008 home meeting with the Lions was marked by several controversial moments. In the first quarter, Lions quarterback Dan Orlovsky committed a widely remembered mistake when he inadvertently stepped out of the back of the end zone for a safety. In the fourth quarter, Orlovsky connected with wide receiver Calvin Johnson on a 32-yard pass down the middle that appeared to place Detroit at the Minnesota 30-yard line. However, officials ruled that Johnson had fumbled after being hit by Vikings safety Darren Sharper, despite replays suggesting Johnson may have been down by contact. Later, with the Lions trailing 10–9 in the final three minutes, the Vikings faced a 2nd-and-20 from their own 32-yard line. Quarterback Gus Frerotte threw deep toward wide receiver Aundrae Allison, and although the pass fell incomplete, field judge Mike Weir called Lions cornerback Leigh Bodden for pass interference despite what appeared to be minimal contact. The penalty placed Minnesota in field-goal range, setting up a 26-yard kick by Ryan Longwell with nine seconds remaining, giving the Vikings a 12–10 victory. The loss was particularly painful for Detroit, which went on to become the first team in NFL history to finish the season 0–16.

The Lions’ struggles continued into the 2009 season in their home meeting with the Vikings. In their matchup in Detroit, during which Minnesota quarterback Brett Favre set the NFL record for consecutive starts at 271, the Lions were defeated once again, extending their losing streak to 19 games, tying the second-longest skid in league history.

By the end of the 2000s decade, the Vikings had dominated the Lions, compiling an 18–2 record against Detroit.

== 2010-present: Rivalry becomes balanced ==
During the 2010 season, the roof of the Vikings’ home stadium, Mall of America Field at the Hubert H. Humphrey Metrodome, collapsed following a heavy snowfall. As a result, the Vikings’ scheduled home game against the New York Giants was relocated to Lions' Ford Field. The game was also notable for quarterback Brett Favre being listed as inactive, ending his NFL-record 297-game starting streak.

In the 2011 season meeting in Minnesota, the Lions overcame a 20–0 halftime deficit against the Vikings and forced overtime. After winning the coin toss, Detroit received the ball, and quarterback Matthew Stafford led a drive that set up kicker Jason Hanson for a game-winning 32-yard field goal. The victory ended the Vikings’ 13-game home winning streak against the Lions and marked Detroit’s first road win over Minnesota since the 1997 season. The Lions defeated the Vikings again in their meeting in Detroit, securing their first season series sweep over Minnesota also since the 1997 season.

In the 2013 season finale in Minnesota, the Vikings defeated the Lions 14–13 in what was the final game played at the Metrodome.

Following the 2015 game in Minnesota, Lions wide receiver Golden Tate stated that he believed the Vikings had taken cheap shots at Detroit.

In the 2016 season, although the Vikings began the year with a 5–0 start, they collapsed in the second half of the season and were swept by the Lions, with both losses coming on Detroit game-winning field goals. By season’s end, Minnesota finished 8–8 and missed the playoffs, while the Lions finished 9–7 and qualified as a wild card.

In the 2018 meeting in Minnesota, the Vikings sacked Matthew Stafford 10 times, setting a new franchise record for the most sacks in a single game.

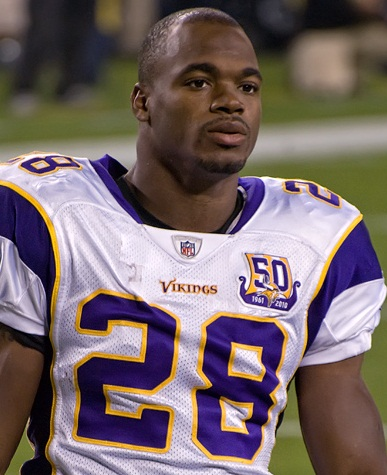
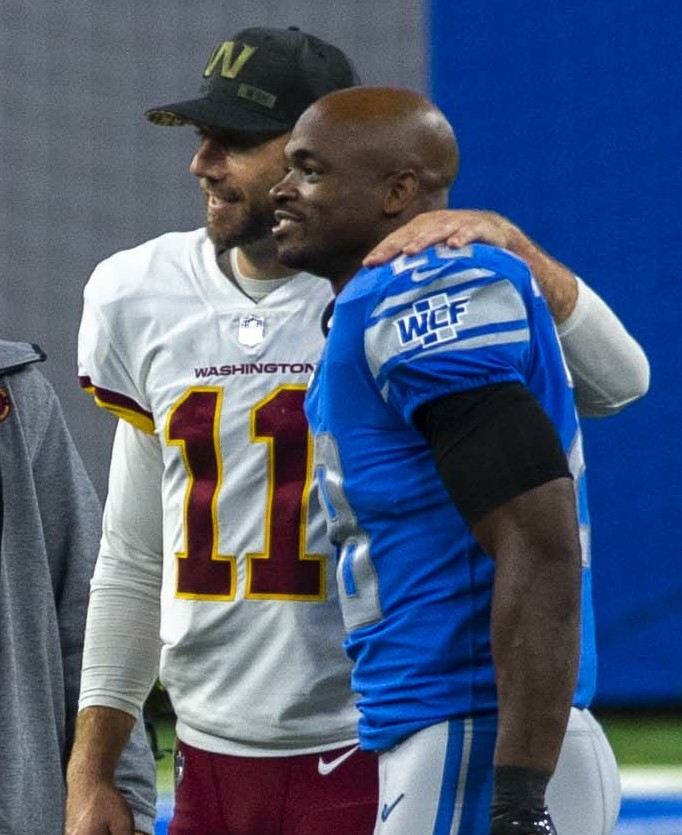
Running back Adrian Peterson was selected by the Vikings in 2007 (left), where he set numerous rushing records and earned the MVP award during the 2012 season. He subsequently had a short tenure with the Lions in the 2020 season (right).

In the 2020 offseason, the Lions signed former Vikings running back Adrian Peterson.

In the 2021 season in Minnesota, the Lions rallied from a 13–6 fourth-quarter deficit and took a one-point lead with 37 seconds remaining. However, the Vikings quickly marched down the field, and kicker Greg Joseph converted a 54-yard game-winning field goal as time expired, extending the Lions’ losing streak and denying them their first win of the season.

The two teams met again later in the season in Detroit, with the Lions seeking not only their first win of the year but also their first victory in nearly a year. In a reversal from their previous matchup, Detroit took a 20–6 lead at halftime. However, the Vikings rallied, and a fumble by Lions quarterback Jared Goff allowed Minnesota to take a 27–23 lead with less than two minutes remaining. On the game’s final play, facing 4th-and-2 from Minnesota’s 11-yard line, Goff connected with wide receiver Amon-Ra St. Brown for an 11-yard touchdown pass, giving the Lions the win. The victory snapped Detroit’s 15-game winless streak, secured their first win of the season after an 0–10–1 start, and marked their first victory since defeating the Chicago Bears in the 2021 season.

The Vikings earned revenge in their 2022 meeting in Minnesota, overcoming a 24–14 fourth-quarter deficit. After Lions kicker Austin Seibert missed a potential game-sealing field goal, Minnesota drove down the field and scored the go-ahead touchdown to complete the comeback.

In their next meeting in Detroit, despite the Vikings losing, wide receiver Justin Jefferson recorded 223 receiving yards, setting a new Minnesota franchise single-game record and surpassing Sammy White’s previous mark of 210 yards, which coincidentally was also set against the Lions in the 1976 season.

In the 2023 season in Minnesota, the Lions beat the Vikings 30–24 to capture the NFC North division title, their first division championship since the 1993 season.

Both teams entered their Week 7 matchup in Minnesota in the 2024 season at 5–0. In a back-and-forth game, the Lions drove down the field late, and kicker Jake Bates converted a 44-yard field goal with 15 seconds remaining to give Detroit the win.

When both teams entered their season finale in Detroit with 14–2 records, the stakes couldn’t have been higher. Not only were the Lions and Vikings competing for the NFC North title, but the winner would also secure the No. 1 seed in the NFC. Additionally, this was the first regular season game to feature two teams with a combined 28 victories. Commentators dubbed the game as one of the most significant and antcipated regular-season contests in NFL history. Although the game was relatively close in the first half, Detroit dominated in the second half, defeating Minnesota 31–9. With that victory, the Lions clinched the NFC North and the top seed in the NFC. Meanwhile, the Vikings, despite finishing the season with a 14–3 record, were relegated to the No. 5 seed in the playoffs.

== Season-by-season results ==
Detroit Lions vs. Minnesota Vikings Season-by-Season Results
1960s (Lions, 9–7–2)

Season	Season series	at Detroit Lions	at Minnesota Vikings	Overall series	Notes
1961	Lions 2–0	Lions; 13–7	Lions; 37–10	Lions; 2–0	Vikings join the National Football League (NFL) as an expansion team. They were placed in the Western Division, resulting in two meetings annually with the Lions.
1962	Lions 2–0	Lions; 37–23	Lions; 17–6	Lions; 4–0	
1963	Tie 1–1	Lions; 28–10	Vikings; 34–31	Lions; 5–1	
1964	Lions 1–0–1	Tie; 23–23	Lions; 24–20	Lions; 6–1–1	In Minnesota, the Lions and Vikings began the game wearing the same white jersey colors due to a miscommunication, the first and only time this happened in NFL history.
1965	Tie 1–1	Vikings; 29–7	Lions; 31–29	Lions; 7–2–1	
1966	Tie 1–1	Vikings; 28–16	Lions; 32–31	Lions; 8–3–1	In Minnesota, Lions K Garo Yepremian kicked 6 field goals, setting an NFL record (broken by Jim Bakken in the 1967 season). Following the Lions' loss in Detroit, fans threw snowballs at Lions head coach Harry Gilmer.
1967	Lions 1–0–1	Lions; 14–3	Tie; 10–10	Lions; 9–3–2	As a result of expansion, the two eight-team divisions became two eight-team conferences split into two divisions, with the Lions and Vikings placed in the NFL Central division. In Minnesota, Lions fumbled 11 times, setting an NFL record.
1968	Vikings 2–0	Vikings; 13–6	Vikings; 24–10	Lions; 9–5–2	
1969	Vikings 2–0	Vikings; 27–0	Vikings; 24–10	Lions; 9–7–2	Following their loss in Minnesota, Lions players had to bathe with cold water, prompting Lions HC Joe Schmidt to remark that they would give the Vikings "an ice bath" in their next game. Game in Detroit was played on Thanksgiving. Last time the Lions held the overall series record. Vikings win 1969 NFL Championship, but lose Super Bowl IV.

1970s (Vikings, 17–3)

Season	Season series	at Detroit Lions	at Minnesota Vikings	Overall series	Notes
1970	Vikings 2–0	Vikings; 30–17	Vikings; 24–20	Tie; 9–9–2	As a result of the AFL–NFL merger, the Lions and Vikings were placed in the newly formed National Football Conference (NFC) and the NFC Central (later renamed to the NFC North in the 2002 season). Both teams make the playoffs in the same season for the first time.
1971	Vikings 2–0	Vikings; 16–13	Vikings; 29–10	Vikings; 11–9–2	In Detroit, Vikings overcame a 13–0 deficit as they took overall series lead with their win. In Minnesota, Vikings clinched the NFC Central with their win.
1972	Vikings 2–0	Vikings; 34–10	Vikings; 16–14	Vikings; 13–9–2	In Minnesota, Vikings CB Bobby Bryant blocked Lions K Errol Mann's 33-yard field goal on the game's final play.
1973	Vikings 2–0	Vikings; 23–9	Vikings; 28–7	Vikings; 15–9–2	In Minnesota, Vikings clinched the NFC Central with their win. Vikings lose Super Bowl VIII.
1974	Tie 1–1	Vikings; 7–6	Lions; 20–16	Vikings; 16–10–2	Vikings win 13 straight meetings (1968–1974). Lions' win came when DB Lem Barney intercepted Vikings' QB Fran Tarkenton's pass in the end zone of the game's final play. Last matchup at Tiger Stadium. Vikings lose Super Bowl IX.
1975	Tie 1–1	Lions; 17–10	Vikings; 25–19	Vikings; 17–11–2	Lions open Pontiac Silverdome.
1976	Vikings 2–0	Vikings; 10–9	Vikings; 31–23	Vikings; 19–11–2	In Detroit, Vikings showed up 5 minutes before the scheduled time for the opening kickoff, resulting in a half-hour delay before the game started. Vikings win came after Lions scored a late touchdown but missed the extra point. In Minnesota, Vikings rookie WR Sammy White finished with 210 receiving yards, setting a franchise record for most receiving yards in a game by one player. (Broken by Justin Jefferson in 2022.); Vikings lose Super Bowl XI.
1977	Vikings 2–0	Vikings; 30–21	Vikings; 14–7	Vikings; 21–11–2	In Detroit, Vikings clinched the NFC Central with their win.
1978	Tie 1–1	Lions; 45–14	Vikings; 17–7	Vikings; 22–12–2	In Detroit, Lions score their most points in a game against the Vikings. Lions QB Gary Danielson finished with 5 passing touchdowns, becoming the first Lions quarterback to throw for five touchdowns in a game.
1979	Vikings 2–0	Vikings; 13–10	Vikings; 14–7	Vikings; 24–12–2	

1980s (Vikings, 13–6)

Season	Season series	at Detroit Lions	at Minnesota Vikings	Overall series	Notes
1980	Tie 1–1	Lions; 27–7	Vikings; 34–0	Vikings; 25–13–2	In Minnesota, Vikings record their largest victory against the Lions with a 34–point differential. Both teams finished with 9–7 records, but the Vikings clinched the NFC Central based on a better conference record, eliminating the Lions from playoff contention.
1981	Tie 1–1	Lions; 45–7	Vikings; 26–24	Vikings; 26–14–2	In Minnesota, Vikings' K Rick Danmeier kicked the game-winning field goal with four seconds left. In Detroit, Lions record their largest victory against the Vikings with a 38–point differential and tied their most points scored in a game against the Vikings (1978). Last matchup at Metropolitan Stadium.
1982	Vikings 1–0	Vikings; 34–31	canceled	Vikings; 27–14–2	Due to the 1982 NFL player strike, the game scheduled in Minnesota was cancelled. Vikings open Hubert H. Humphrey Metrodome.
1983	Tie 1–1	Lions; 13–2	Vikings; 20–17	Vikings; 28–15–2	Vikings win eight straight home meetings (1975–1983).
1984	Tie 1–1	Vikings; 29–28	Lions; 16–14	Vikings; 29–16–2	In Minnesota, Lions' RB Billy Sims suffered a catastrophic right knee injury after setting the franchise's all-time rushing record (broken by Barry Sanders). The injury ultimately ended Sims' career.
1985	Tie 1–1	Lions; 41–21	Vikings; 16–13	Vikings; 30–17–2	In Minnesota, Vikings K Jan Stenerud made a game-winning 28-yard field goal with four seconds remaining. Final season for Vikings HC Bud Grant. He finished with a 26–8–1 record against the Lions.
1986	Tie 1–1	Vikings; 24–10	Lions; 13–10	Vikings; 31–18–2	
1987	Vikings 2–0	Vikings; 17–14	Vikings; 34–19	Vikings; 33–18–2	
1988	Vikings 2–0	Vikings; 23–0	Vikings; 44–17	Vikings; 35–18–2	In Minnesota, Vikings score their most points in a game against the Lions. Game in Detroit was played on Thanksgiving. Lions finished with 60 total yards, setting a franchise record for the fewest yards in a single game. They also finished with three first downs, tying the franchise record for the fewest in a game. Meanwhile, the Vikings tied a franchise record for the fewest yards allowed in a game and set a new franchise record for the fewest first downs allowed.
1989	Vikings 2–0	Vikings; 20–7	Vikings; 24–17	Vikings; 37–18–2	

1990s (Tie, 10–10)

Season	Season series	at Detroit Lions	at Minnesota Vikings	Overall series	Notes
1990	Tie 1–1	Vikings; 17–7	Lions; 34–27	Vikings; 38–19–2	
1991	Lions 2–0	Lions; 24–20	Lions; 34–14	Vikings; 38–21–2	In Detroit, Lions overcame a 20–3 fourth-quarter deficit. In Minnesota, Lions running back Barry Sanders finished with 220 rushing yards and four touchdowns, setting a franchise record for most rushing yards in a game by a player (broken by him in 1994) and a franchise record for most rushing touchdowns in a game by a player. Lions' first season series sweep against the Vikings since the 1962 season.
1992	Tie 1–1	Lions; 31–17	Vikings; 31–14	Vikings; 39–22–2	
1993	Tie 1–1	Vikings; 13–0	Lions; 30–27	Vikings; 40–23–2	In Minnesota, Vikings overcame a 27–13 fourth-quarter deficit and a pass interference penalty on Vikings Cornerback Anthony Parker gave the Lions another chance to score the game-winning touchdown, which they did with 40 seconds remaining.
1994	Tie 1–1	Lions; 41–19	Vikings; 10–3	Vikings; 41–24–2	In Detroit, Vikings Wide Receiver Cris Carter set an NFL record for most receptions in a single season (broken by Herman Moore in the 1995 season.)
1995	Tie 1–1	Lions; 44–38	Vikings; 20–10	Vikings; 42–25–2	In Minnesota, Vikings kicker Fuad Reveiz set an NFL record by making his 30th consecutive field goal. Game in Detroit was played on Thanksgiving. The game's final score is the highest-scoring game between the two teams (82 points). Lions quarterback Scott Mitchell threw for 410 yards, setting a franchise record for most passing yards in a game (broken by Charlie Batch in 2001 season.)
1996	Vikings 2–0	Vikings; 24–22	Vikings; 17–13	Vikings; 44–25–2	
1997	Lions 2–0	Lions; 38–15	Lions; 14–13	Vikings; 44–27–2	In Minnesota, Lions wide receiver Herman Moore caught an alley-oop game-winning touchdown with three seconds left on the game's final play. Both teams finished with 9–7 records, but the Lions clinched the better playoff seed based on their head-to-head sweep.
1998	Vikings 2–0	Vikings; 34–13	Vikings; 29–6	Vikings; 46–27–2	
1999	Tie 1–1	Lions; 25–23	Vikings; 24–17	Vikings; 47–28–2	In Detroit, Lions kicker Jason Hanson converted six field goals, including the game-winning 48-yard field goal with seven seconds remaining, to tie the franchise record for most field goals made in a game. Vikings' win clinched them a better playoff seed than the Lions, along with home-field advantage in the Wild Card round. Had the Lions won, the Vikings would have traveled to Detroit for their first playoff matchup against each other.

2000s (Vikings, 18–2)

Season	Season series	at Detroit Lions	at Minnesota Vikings	Overall series	Notes
2000	Vikings 2–0	Vikings; 31–24	Vikings; 24–17	Vikings; 49–28–2	In Minnesota, Vikings clinched a playoff berth with their win and wide receiver Cris Carter became the second player in NFL history to record 1,000 career receptions.
2001	Tie 1–1	Lions; 27–24	Vikings; 31–26	Vikings; 50–29–2	Lions' win snapped a 13-game losing streak and marked their first win of the season after an 0–12 start. Last matchup at Pontiac Silverdome.
2002	Vikings 2–0	Vikings; 38–36	Vikings; 31–24	Vikings; 52–29–2	Lions open Ford Field.
2003	Vikings 2–0	Vikings; 23–13	Vikings; 24–14	Vikings; 54–29–2	
2004	Vikings 2–0	Vikings; 28–27	Vikings; 22–19	Vikings; 56–29–2	
2005	Vikings 2–0	Vikings; 21–16	Vikings; 27–14	Vikings; 58–29–2	
2006	Vikings 2–0	Vikings; 30–20	Vikings; 26–17	Vikings; 60–29–2	In Minnesota, Vikings overcame a 17–3 fourth-quarter deficit. Vikings win ten straight meetings (2002–2006).
2007	Tie 1–1	Lions; 20–17 (OT)	Vikings; 42–10	Vikings; 61–30–2	In Detroit, Vikings' kicker Ryan Longwell missed a potential game-winning 52-yard field goal on the game's final play before overtime.
2008	Vikings 2–0	Vikings; 20–16	Vikings; 12–10	Vikings; 63–30–2	In Minnesota, Lions' QB Dan Orlovsky infamously runs out of the back of his own end zone for a safety. Longwell kicked a 26-yard field goal with nine seconds remaining to secure the win. Lions complete first 0–16 season in NFL history.
2009	Vikings 2–0	Vikings; 27–13	Vikings; 27–10	Vikings; 65–30–2	In Detroit, Vikings quarterback Brett Favre set an NFL record for consecutive starts at 271. The Lions’ loss extended their losing streak to 19 games, tying the second-longest skid in league history at the time.

2010s (Vikings, 11–9)

Season	Season series	at Detroit Lions	at Minnesota Vikings	Overall series	Notes
2010	Tie 1–1	Lions; 20–13	Vikings; 24–10	Vikings; 66–31–2	Vikings win thirteen straight home meetings (1998–2010). Due to the collapse of the Vikings’ stadium roof following a heavy snowfall, Vikings' home game against the New York Giants was moved to Ford Field. The game was also memorable for quarterback Brett Favre being listed as inactive, ending his NFL-record 297-game starting streak.
2011	Lions 2–0	Lions; 34–28	Lions; 26–23 (OT)	Vikings; 66–33–2	In Minnesota, the Lions overcame a 20–0 halftime deficit, winning at Minnesota for the first time since the 1997 season and snapped an 11-game division road losing streak. Lions' first season series sweep against the Vikings since the 1997 season.
2012	Vikings 2–0	Vikings; 20–13	Vikings; 34–24	Vikings; 68–33–2	
2013	Tie 1–1	Lions; 34–24	Vikings; 14–13	Vikings; 69–34–2	Game in Minnesota was the final game played at Mall of America Field at the Hubert H. Humphrey Metrodome.
2014	Lions 2–0	Lions; 16–14	Lions; 17–3	Vikings; 69–36–2	Vikings temporarily play at TCF Bank Stadium (now known as Huntington Bank Stadium) for two seasons.
2015	Vikings 2–0	Vikings; 28–19	Vikings; 26–16	Vikings; 71–36–2	
2016	Lions 2–0	Lions; 16–13	Lions; 22–16 (OT)	Vikings; 71–38–2	Vikings open U.S. Bank Stadium. Game in Detroit took place on Thanksgiving.
2017	Tie 1–1	Vikings; 30–23	Lions; 14–7	Vikings; 72–39–2	Game in Detroit took place on Thanksgiving. Road team splits the season series for the first time since the 1993 season.
2018	Vikings 2–0	Vikings; 27–9	Vikings; 24–9	Vikings; 74–39–2	In Minnesota, Vikings finished with 10 sacks, setting a franchise record for most sacks in a game.
2019	Vikings 2–0	Vikings; 42–30	Vikings; 20–7	Vikings; 76–39–2	

2020s (Lions, 7–6)

Season	Season series	at Detroit Lions	at Minnesota Vikings	Overall series	Notes
2020	Vikings 2–0	Vikings; 37–35	Vikings; 34–20	Vikings; 78–39–2	Lions sign former Vikings running back Adrian Peterson.
2021	Tie 1–1	Lions; 29–27	Vikings; 19–17	Vikings; 79–40–2	Vikings kicker Greg Joseph kicked a 54-yard game-winning field goal as time expired to extend the Vikings’ winning streak against the Lions to eight (2017–2021). In Detroit, Lions quarterback Jared Goff threw an 11-yard touchdown pass to wide receiver Amon-Ra St. Brown on the game’s final play, securing their first win of the season after an 0–10–1 start and snapping a 15-game winless streak.
2022	Tie 1–1	Lions; 34–23	Vikings; 28–24	Vikings; 80–41–2	In Minnesota, Vikings overcame a 24–14 fourth quarter deficit. In Detroit, Vikings wide receiver Justin Jefferson set a Vikings single-game record with 223 receiving yards.
2023	Lions 2–0	Lions; 30–20	Lions; 30–24	Vikings; 80–43–2	In Minnesota, Lions clinch their first NFC North title and first division title since the 1993 season with their win.
2024	Lions 2–0	Lions; 31–9	Lions; 31–29	Vikings; 80–45–2	Lions' win in Minnesota was the Vikings' only home loss in their 2024 season. In Detroit, Lions clinched the NFC North title, the NFC #1 seed, and win all of their division games for the first time in franchise history with their win.
2025	Vikings 2–0	Vikings; 27–24	Vikings; 23–10	Vikings; 82–45–2	Game in Minnesota was played on Christmas, during which the Vikings eliminated the Lions from playoff contention with a win.
2026	Lions 1–0	Lions; 19–15	December 20	Vikings; 82–46–2	

Summary of results

Season	Season series	at Detroit Lions	at Minnesota Vikings	Notes
Regular season	Vikings 82–46–2	Vikings 37–28–1	Vikings 45–18–1	

== See also ==
- List of NFL rivalries
- NFC North
- Little Brown Jug (college football trophy)
