= Red Hickey =

American football player and coach (1917–2006)

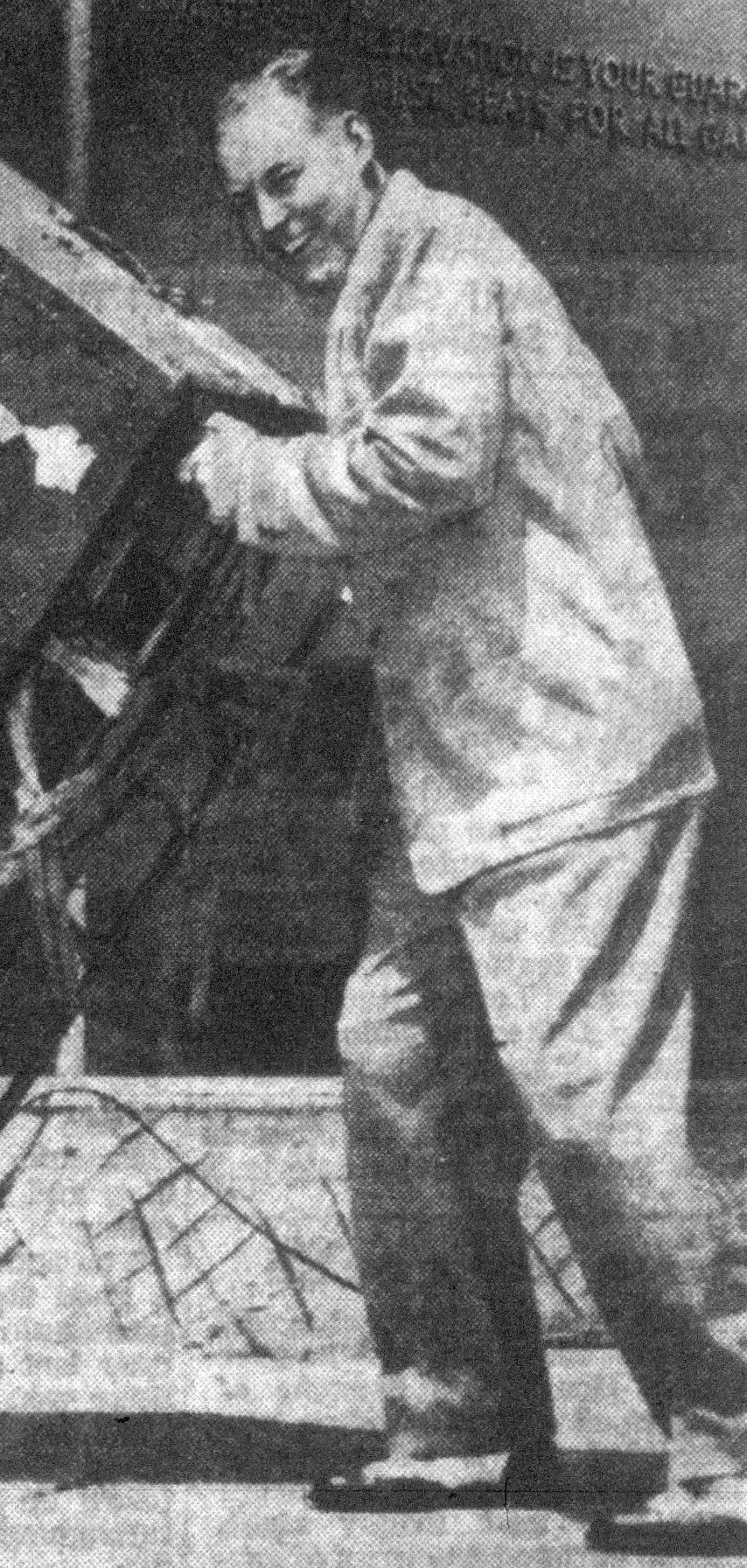
- Hickey, circa 1950

No. 39, 28, 53
- Position: End

Personal information
- Born: February 14, 1917; Clarksville, Arkansas, U.S.
- Died: March 30, 2006 (aged 89); Aptos, California, U.S.
- Listed height: 6 ft 2 in (1.88 m)
- Listed weight: 204 lb (93 kg)

Career information
- High school: Clarksville
- College: Arkansas
- NFL draft: 1941: 6th round, 41st overall pick

Career history

Playing
- Pittsburgh Steelers (1941); Cleveland / Los Angeles Rams (1941, 1945–1948)

Coaching
- Los Angeles Rams (1949–1954) Assistant coach; San Francisco 49ers (1955–1958) Assistant coach; San Francisco 49ers (1959–1963) Head coach; Dallas Cowboys (1964–1965) Offensive end coach

Operations
- Dallas Cowboys (1966–1981) Scout

Awards and highlights
- 2× Super Bowl champion (VI, XII); NFL champion (1945); First-team All-SWC (1939); Second-team All-SWC (1940)

Career NFL statistics
- Receptions: 75
- Receiving yards: 1,288
- Touchdowns: 16
- Stats at Pro Football Reference

Head coaching record
- Regular season: 27–27–1 (.500)
- Coaching profile at Pro Football Reference

Howard Wayne "Red" Hickey (February 14, 1917 – March 30, 2006) was an American professional football player and coach. He played in the National Football League (NFL) with the Pittsburgh Steelers in 1941 and the Cleveland / Los Angeles Rams from 1945 to 1948. Hickey served as head coach for the NFL's San Francisco 49ers from 1959 to 1963.

With Hickey as their head coach, the 1960 49ers became the first NFL team to adopt the shotgun formation as its primary mode of offense. Until then, the alignment had been used only sparingly around the league.

== Early life and college ==
A native of Clarksville, Arkansas, Hickey began playing football what a student at Clarksville High School in that community.

Hickey attended the University of Arkansas, competing as a member of the football and basketball teams, where he won All-Conference accolades in both sports. In 1941, he was a forward on the Razorback team that reached the Final Four teams, although the tournament format was different from today and did not end in a four team final. While at the University of Arkansas, Hickey was a member of Xi chapter of Kappa Sigma fraternity.

== NFL playing career ==
Hickey was drafted by the Philadelphia Eagles in the sixth round (41st overall) of the 1941 NFL draft. His rights were transferred to the Pittsburgh Steelers due to the events later referred to as the Pennsylvania Polka. He also played for the Cleveland Rams, then missed the next three years while serving as a U.S. Navy gunnery officer during World War II. Upon his return, he was part of the 1945 Rams championship squad, then shifted with the team to Los Angeles to play from 1946 to 1948. During his first season back, he also married his high school sweetheart, Cecelia Surina.

== NFL coaching career ==
Despite having finished the 1948 NFL season as the team's second-leading receiver with 30 catches for 509 yards and seven touchdowns, Hickey retired and joined the Rams' coaching ranks on April 20, 1949, as ends coach. He remained in that capacity with the team for six seasons until resigning on December 12, 1954, along with his fellow assistants. The departure was the result of continued conflicts with head coach Hamp Pool.

Hickey (L) on the staff of the 1953 Los Angeles Rams.

Just over two weeks after leaving the Rams, Hickey was hired as a 49ers assistant under new head coach Red Strader, but after the team struggled during the 1955 season, Strader was replaced in favor of former 49er quarterback Frankie Albert. Hickey stayed as an assistant during the three years Albert handled sideline duties for the team, and in 1957, helped quarterback Y. A. Tittle and wide receiver R.C. Owens develop what became known as the "Alley-Oop" pass. The play was designed to take advantage of Owens's phenomenal leaping abilities and proved to be a success.

When Albert resigned following the 1958 season, citing the constant fan abuse heaped on not only him, but his family, Hickey was promoted to head coach on December 16 and received a three-year contract.

During that first season, the 49ers put up a stiff challenge to the defending champions Baltimore Colts, managing a tie for the Western Conference lead with two games to play. However, on December 5, the Colts broke the deadlock with a 34–14 victory and went on to capture another NFL title.

The following season saw the team battle inconsistency for the first two-thirds of the campaign until Hickey installed a new offensive scheme on November 27, when the 49ers faced the favored Colts in Baltimore. In an attempt to quell their strong pass rush, Hickey had the quarterback stand seven yards back behind the line of scrimmage in what he called the "shotgun formation" that gave the signal-caller more time to survey the entire field and throw the ball. The expectation was that Colts would alter their defensive strategy. The result was a shocking 30–22 upset that saw the visitors roll up 356 yards without a turnover. The 49ers won three of their final four games to again finish 7–5, but this time appeared to be different with Hickey under contract for three years.

Hickey made a dramatic change in the chemistry of the team with the trade of Tittle in the offseason. While Tittle went on to lead the New York Giants to the first of three consecutive berths in the NFL Championship game, his former team made a seamless transition in the early weeks of the campaign, when the trio of veteran John Brodie, sophomore Bobby Waters and rookie Billy Kilmer provided strong play at the position.

After the 49ers reeled off victories in four of their first five games, which included shutout wins over the Rams and Detroit Lions, the magic disappeared in a 31-0 loss on October 22 against the Chicago Bears on the road. The Bears moved linebacker Bill George from his regular spot up to the line of scrimmage, from where he triggered a ferocious strong pass rush in the face of the quarterback, essentially putting an end to the shotgun formation. The absence of a true leader behind center was magnified when Tittle led his new team, the

After the team's 7–6–1 campaign in 1961, the 49ers dropped slightly the following year, finishing 6–8. When the team lost its first three games in 1963, the last coming in a 45–14 thrashing by the Minnesota Vikings, Hickey resigned on September 30, and two weeks later was hired as a Rams' scout for the remainder of the year.

== Scouting and later life ==
On February 1, 1964, he joined the Cowboys as the offensive end coach, serving for two years under Tom Landry. He had been a strong candidate to become head coach of the expansion Atlanta Falcons, but the post was given to Green Bay assistant Norb Hecker on January 26, 1966. Just six weeks later, Hickey resigned his coaching position and asked to join the Cowboys scouting staff.

Hickey spent the next two decades as a Cowboys scout and watched with pride when his team dusted off his old offense in 1975, using it only in specific situations, but popularizing a strategy that remains to this day. He retired as a scout in 1982.

On an individual level, he was elected to the Arkansas Sports Hall of Fame in 1968, while his son, Mike, followed him into the world of scouting, working for the New England Patriots and New York Jets.

== Head coaching record ==
=== NFL ===
Team	Year	Regular season				
Team	Year	Won	Lost	Ties	Win %	Finish
SF	1959	7	5	0	.583	3rd NFL Western
SF	1960	7	5	0	.583	3rd NFL Western
SF	1961	7	6	1	.536	5th NFL Western
SF	1962	6	8	0	.429	5th NFL Western
SF	1963	0	3	0	.000	Resigned mid-season
SF total		27	27	1	.500	
Total		27	27	1	.500	
