= Rorer A. James =

American politician

Rorer James
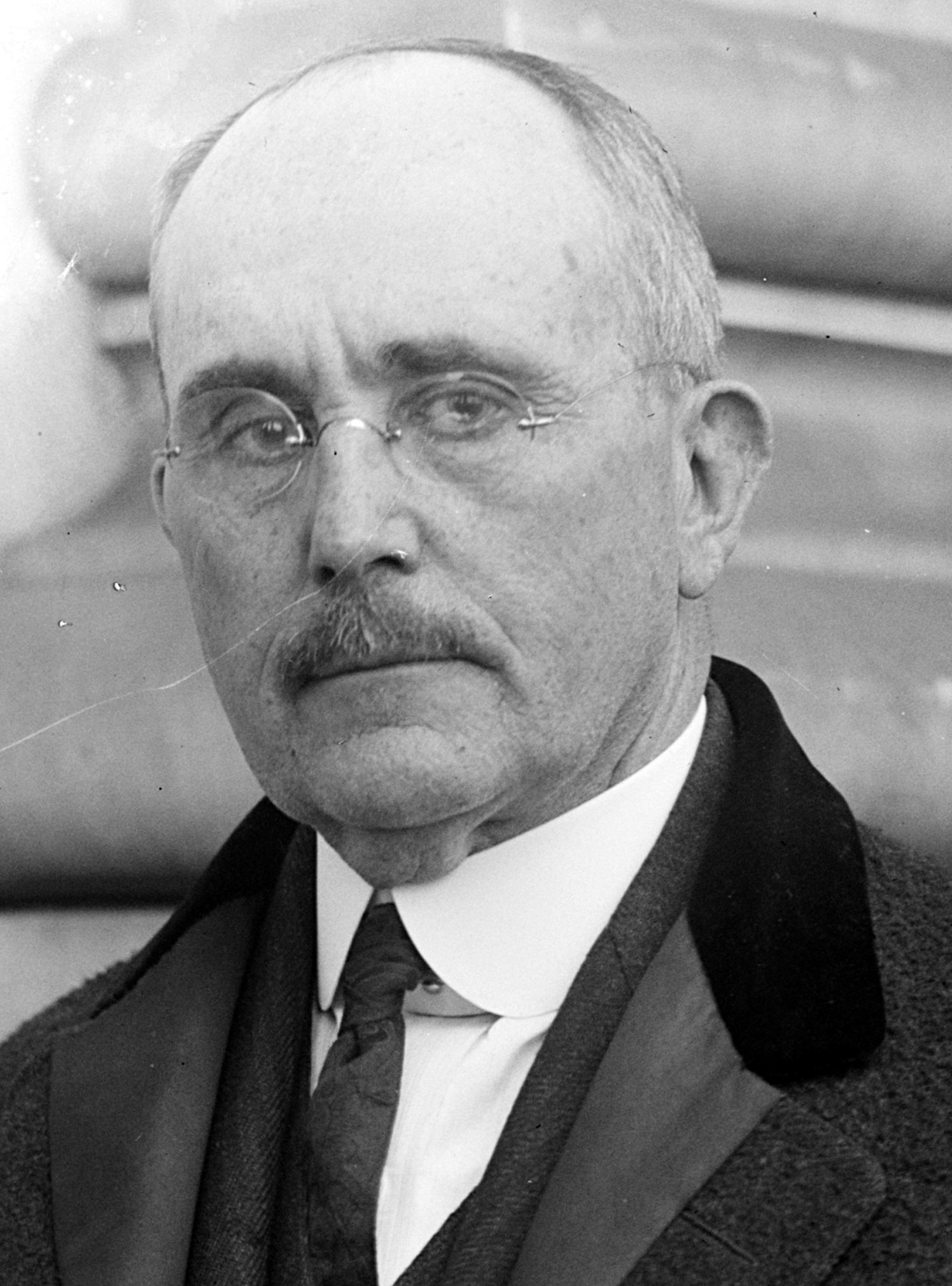

Member of the U.S. House of Representatives from Virginia's 5th district
- In office June 1, 1920 – August 6, 1921
- Preceded by: Edward W. Saunders
- Succeeded by: J. Murray Hooker

Member of the Virginia Senate from the 23rd district
- In office December 1, 1897 – December 4, 1901
- Preceded by: James L. Tredway
- Succeeded by: William A. Garrett

Member of the Virginia House of Delegates for Pittsylvania and Danville
- In office December 4, 1889 – December 6, 1893; Alongside R.J. Anderson, Beverley Davis and J.W. Gregory
- Preceded by: Sherwood T. Mustain

Personal details
- Born: March 1, 1859 Brosville, Virginia
- Died: August 6, 1921 (aged 62) Danville, Virginia
- Resting place: Green Hill Cemetery
- Party: Democratic
- Education: Roanoke College; Virginia Military Institute; University of Virginia
- Profession: lawyer, newspaper editor

Rorer Abraham James (March 1, 1859 – August 6, 1921) was an early-20th-century American lawyer, newspaperman, and politician from Virginia. As a politician, he served in the Virginia House, Senate, and briefly as United States Representative.

== Biography ==
Born near Brosville, Virginia, James was instructed by private tutors. He attended Roanoke College, before graduating from the Virginia Military Institute at Lexington in 1882 and from the law department of the University of Virginia at Charlottesville in 1887. James was admitted to the bar in 1887 and commenced legal practice in Danville, Virginia. He became owner and editor of the Danville Register in 1899 and later purchased the Danville Bee.

=== Political career ===
James served as member of the Virginia House of Delegates in the years 1889–1892, and in the Senate of Virginia from 1893 through 1901.

Nearly 20 years after leaving the Virginia Senate, James went as a delegate to the Democratic National Convention of 1920. He subsequently served as chairman of the fifth district Democratic committee, then as chairman of the Democratic State committee. In addition to his political appointments, James also acted as head of the Virginia Military Institute board of trustees.

James was elected as a Democrat to the Sixty-sixth Congress, by special election, to fill the vacancy caused by the resignation of U.S. Representative Edward W. Saunders, and reelected to the Sixty-seventh Congress (June 1, 1920 – August 6, 1921).

== Death and burial ==
He died on August 6, 1921, in Danville, Virginia, and was interred in Green Hill Cemetery.

== See also ==
- List of members of the United States Congress who died in office (1900–1949)

== Sources ==
- United States Congress. "Rorer A. James (id: J000052)". Biographical Directory of the United States Congress.

U.S. House of Representatives
Preceded by Edward W. Saunders	Member of the U.S. House of Representatives from Virginia's 5th congressional district 1920–1921	Succeeded by J. Murray Hooker
