= Fabiola Trejo =

Mexican women's rights activist

- Born: Mexico
- Occupation(s): social psychologist, women's rights activist
- Awards: 100 Women (BBC) (2023)

Fabiola Trejo is a Mexican social psychologist and researcher. She is known for addressing social inequality, gender violence and the political power of sexual pleasure. In November 2023, Trejo was named as one of BBC's 100 Women.

== Biography ==
Trjejo received her PhD in social psychology from the National Autonomous University of Mexico. She was a student of the American sex educator Betty Dodson, and became a facilitator of her workshops. Throughout her career, Trejo has addressed issues related to social inequality, gender violence and the political power of sexual pleasure from a feminist perspective, with the aim of promoting sexual justice for all women. She is known for her work on the dissemination of female sexuality, highlighting the importance of sexual pleasure in the empowerment of women. Trejo has given lectures and workshops where she addresses issues such as the need to break with the prevailing reproductive model of sexuality; normalize those relationships that go beyond the heterosexual and monogamous; and encourage women to self-explore and masturbate.

== Recognition ==
In 2023, for her activism to break down taboos surrounding sexuality, she was included in the BBC 100 Women list.
