= Betty Dodson =

American sex educator (1929–2020)

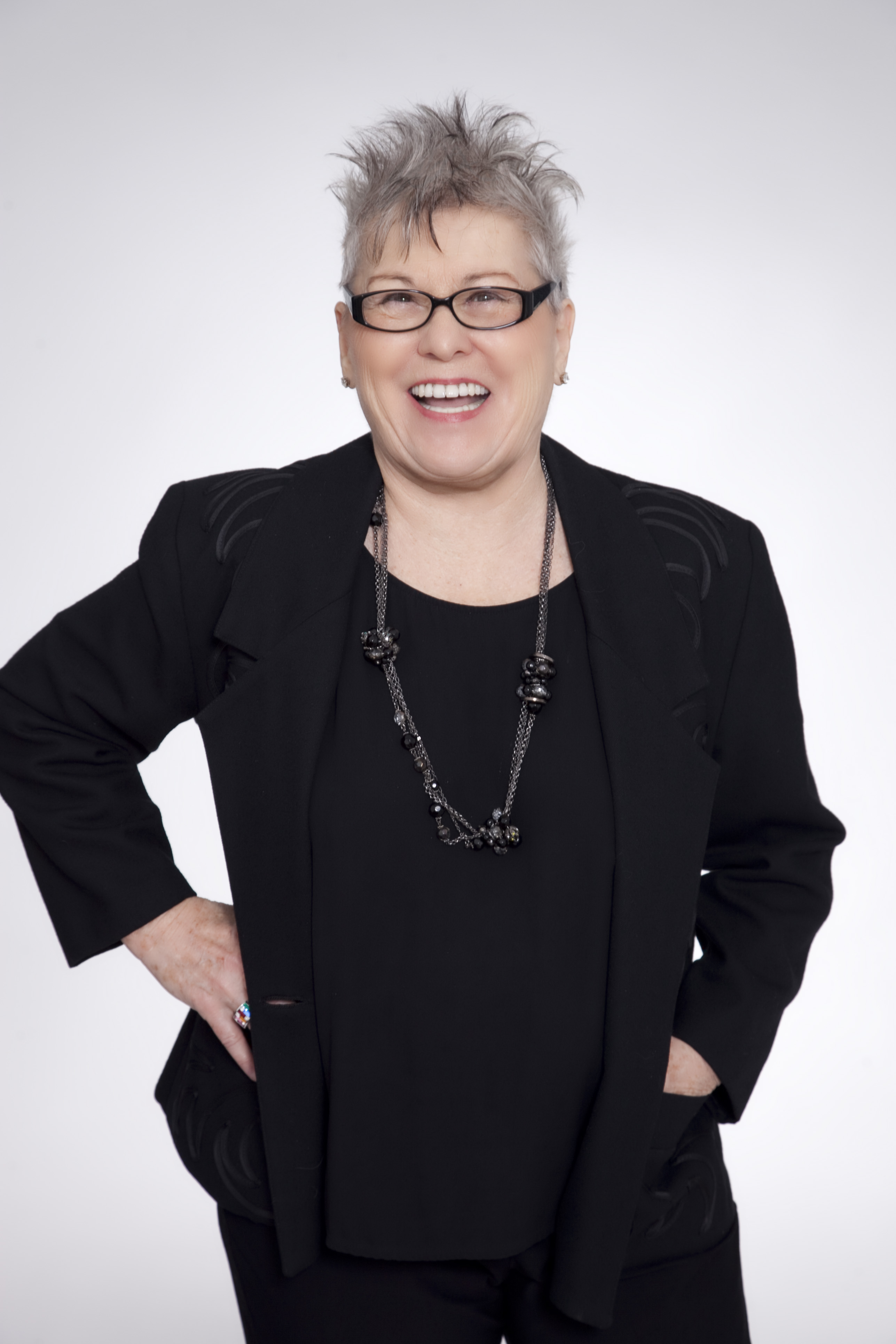
- Dodson in 2010
- Born: August 24, 1929; Wichita, Kansas, U.S.
- Died: October 31, 2020 (aged 91); New York City, U.S.
- Known for: Sex-positive feminism

Betty Dodson (August 24, 1929 – October 31, 2020) was an American sex educator. An artist by training, she exhibited erotic art in New York City, before pioneering the pro-sex feminist movement. Dodson's workshops and manuals encourage women to masturbate, often in groups.

== Early career ==
Dodson went to New York City to train as an artist in 1950, and lived on Manhattan's Madison Avenue from 1962. In 1959, Dodson married Frederick Lief, an advertising director; they divorced in 1965. Dodson's quest for "sexual self-discovery" began after her divorce. Dodson held a first one-woman show of erotic art at the Wickersham Gallery in New York City in 1968. In 1987, her Ms. magazine memoir and instructional series, Sex for One, was published. Random House later published the work broadly, and it was translated into 25 languages.

Dodson criticized Eve Ensler's The Vagina Monologues, which she believed has a negative and restrictive view of sexuality with an anti-male bias.

Dodson earned a degree from the unaccredited Institute for the Advanced Study of Human Sexuality for her research work on sexuality.

== Workshops and coaching ==
Dodson became active in the sex-positive movement in the late 1960s.

From the 1970s onwards, she organised Bodysex workshops. Bodysex is a practice developed by Betty Dodson to help women connect with their bodies and erogenous zones, heal shames, improve pleasure perception, and promote self-love. In the workshops, women were guided to explore their bodies and masturbate together to learn, with guidance, how to have an orgasm as a woman alone and with a sexual partner.

Her two-hour sessions featured 15 naked women, each using a Hitachi Magic Wand to aid in masturbation. Dodson used the Magic Wand, a mains-powered vibrator, in demonstrations and instructional classes to instruct women regarding self-pleasure techniques. She provided a Magic Wand to each woman for these sessions. She recommended women put a small towel over their vulva in order to dull the sensation of the vibrator and prolong the pleasurable experience.

The essence of her method was to provide vaginal and clitoral stimulation at the same time. Dodson taught thousands of women to achieve orgasm using this technique. Her technique became known as the Betty Dodson Method.

A study conducted in 2007 tested the "Betty Dodson Method" in group therapy with 500 previously anorgasmic women. Of the 500, 465 (93%) had orgasms during therapy, while 35 (7%) did not. In a 2021 study, the female techniques for pleasurable vaginal intercourse taught by Dodson ("Angling, Rocking, Shallowing, Pairing") are again described by women.

== Later career ==
Dodson published a memoir, Sex by Design, in 2010.

In 2014, she stated that she considered herself a fourth-wave feminist, stating that the previous waves of feminist were banal and anti-sexual, which is why she has chosen to look at a new stance of feminism, fourth wave feminism. In 2014, Dodson worked with women to discover their sexual desires through masturbation. Dodson said her work has gained support from an audience of young, successful women who have never had an orgasm. This includes fourth-wave feminists – those rejecting the anti-pleasure stance they believe third-wave feminists stand for.

Dodson died on October 31, 2020, at the age of 91, from cirrhosis in a Manhattan nursing home.

== Bibliography ==
- Dodson, Betty (1978). Liberating Masturbation: A Meditation on Self Love. Dodson.
- Dodson, Betty (1996). Sex for One: The Joy of Selfloving. New York: Crown Trade Paperbacks. ISBN 0-517-88607-3. OCLC 15696491.
- Dodson, Betty (2003). Orgasms for Two: The Joy of Partnersex. Potter/Ten Speed/Harmony/Rodale. ISBN 978-1-4000-5203-5.
- Dodson, Betty (2013). Learn to Orgasm in 4 Acts. Betty A Dodson Foundation Incorporated. ISBN 978-0-578-12140-6.
- Dodson, Betty (2016). Sex by Design: The Betty Dodson Story. CreateSpace Independent Publishing Platform. ISBN 978-1-5308-3412-9.

=== By others ===
- Muscio, Inga (March 13, 2018). Cunt: A Declaration of Independence. Foreword by Betty Dodson (20th anniversary ed.). New York: Seal Press. ISBN 978-1-58005-664-9. OCLC 1008762930.
