= 1954 Little All-America college football team =

American college football all-star team

The 1954 Little All-America college football team is composed of college football players from small colleges and universities who were selected by the Associated Press (AP) as the best players at each position. For 1954, the AP selected three teams of 11 players each, with no separate defensive platoons.

Running back Leo Lewis of Lincoln University (Missouri) was selected on the first team for the second consecutive year. He later played 12 years for the Winnipeg Blue Bombers and was inducted into both the Canadian Football Hall of Fame and the College Football Hall of Fame.

End R. C. Owens of the College of Idaho played eight seasons in the NFL and was inducted into the San Francisco 49ers Hall of Fame.

Center Stokeley Fulton of Hampden–Sydney College later served as head coach at his alma mater from 1960 to 1984, winning 10 conference championships.

== First team ==
Position	Player	Team
B	Alvin Beal	Trinity (TX)
B	Richard Young	Chattanooga
B	Leo Lewis	Lincoln (MO)
B	Don Miller	Delaware
E	William McKenna	Brandeis
E	R. C. Owens	College of Idaho
T	Joe Veto	Juniata
T	Larry Paradis	Whitworth
G	Robert Patterson	Memphis State
G	Gene Nei	Gustavus Adolphus
C	Stokeley Fulton	Hampden–Sydney

== Second team ==
Position	Player	Team
B	Charles Sticka	Trinity (CT)
B	Ray Porta	Southeastern Louisiana
B	Charles Podoley	Central Michigan
B	William Morton	Hobart
E	Charles Cianciola	Lawrence
E	Gerry Raasch	Valparaiso
T	Al Makowiecki	Florida State
T	Joe James	Howard Payne
G	Luther Shealey	Presbyterian
G	Victor Buccola	Cal Poly
C	Howard Backland	San Diego State

== Third team ==
Position	Player	Team
B	Elroy Payne	McMurry
B	Lem Harpey	College of Emporia
B	Dwaine Miller	Morningside
B	William Pappas	New Hampshire
E	Richard Paciaroni	West Chester
E	Von Morgan	Abilene Christian
T	Kenneth Dement	Southeast Missouri State
T	Robert Higgins	Wayne Teachers
G	Andrew George	Willamette
G	Hampton Cook	Mississippi Southern
C	Bill Vanderstoep	Whitworth

== See also ==
- 1954 College Football All-America Team
