= J. Murray Hooker =

American politician

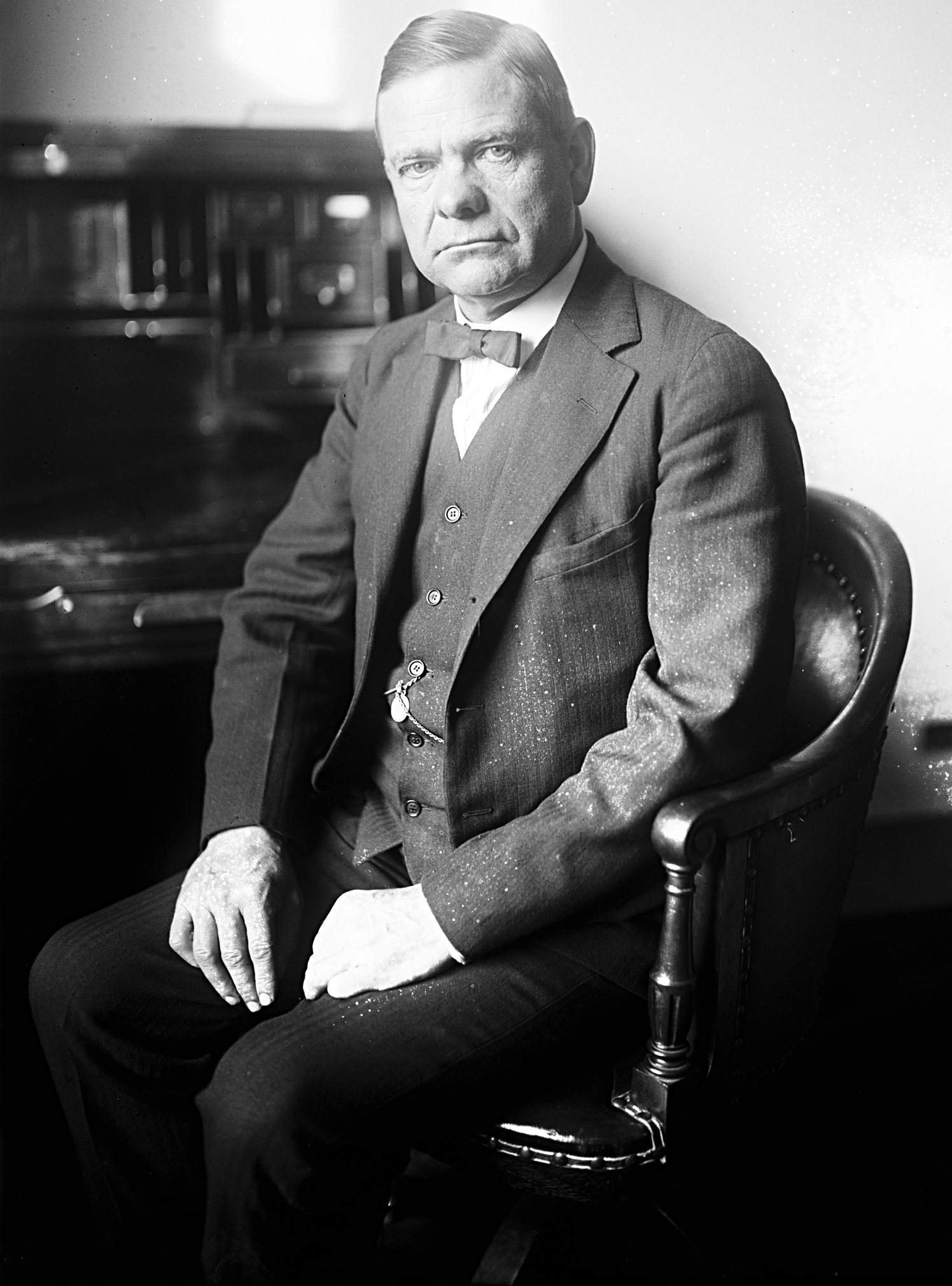

Member of the U.S. House of Representatives from Virginia's 5th district
- In office November 8, 1921 – March 3, 1925
- Preceded by: Rorer A. James
- Succeeded by: Joseph Whitehead

Personal details
- Born: October 29, 1873 Buffalo Ridge, Virginia
- Died: August 6, 1940 (aged 66) Stuart, Virginia
- Party: Democratic
- Education: College of William and Mary; Washington and Lee University
- Profession: lawyer

James Murray Hooker (October 29, 1873 – August 6, 1940) was a lawyer and U.S. Representative from Virginia.

== Biography ==
Born in Buffalo Ridge, Virginia, Hooker attended the public schools. He was graduated from the College of William and Mary in Williamsburg, Virginia, and from the law department of Washington and Lee University in Lexington, Virginia, in 1896. He was admitted to the bar in 1896 and commenced practice in Stuart, Virginia. He served as Commonwealth's attorney for Patrick County, Virginia. He served as delegate to the Virginia constitutional convention in 1901 and 1902. He served as member of the board of visitors to the Virginia Military Institute at Lexington in 1901–1906. He served as member of the Virginia Fisheries Commission in 1908–1914.

Hooker was elected as a Democrat to the Sixty-seventh Congress to fill the vacancy caused by the death of Rorer A. James. He was reelected to the Sixty-eighth Congress and served from November 8, 1921, to March 3, 1925. He was not a candidate for renomination in 1924. He served as delegate to the Democratic National Convention in 1924. He served as chairman of the Democratic State committee in 1925. He resumed the practice of his profession at Stuart, Virginia, where he died August 6, 1940. He was interred in Stuart Cemetery.

== Electoral history ==
- 1921; Hooker was elected to the U.S. House of Representatives with 63.61% of the vote in a special election, defeating Republican Thomas L. Felts and Independent J.R. Wilson.
- 1922; Hooker was re-elected with 70.92% of the vote, defeating Republican Charles P. Smith.

== Sources ==
- United States Congress. "J. Murray Hooker (id: H000759)". Biographical Directory of the United States Congress.

U.S. House of Representatives
Preceded by Rorer A. James	Member of the U.S. House of Representatives from Virginia's 5th congressional district 1921–1925	Succeeded by Joseph Whitehead
