= Wickersham =

Wickersham is a surname originating from Sussex, England. Notable people with the surname include:

- Bob Wickersham (born 1948), American politician from Nebraska
- Cornelius W. Wickersham (1885–1968), Brigadier General in the United States Army, philatelic writer, winner of the Lichtenstein Medal in 1959
- Dave Wickersham (1935–2022, former Major League Baseball pitcher
- Emily Wickersham (born 1984), American actress
- George W. Wickersham (1858–1936), 48th U.S. Attorney General
- J. Hunter Wickersham (1890–1918), recipient of the Medal of Honor during World War I
- James Wickersham (1857–1939), American politician and judge from Alaska
- Jeff Wickersham (fl. 1980s), American football player
- Jonny Wickersham (born 1967), guitarist for The Cadillac Tramps, Youth Brigade, U.S. Bombs, and Social Distortion
- Liz Wickersham, host of CNN's entertainment newsmagazine Showbiz Today
- Seth Wickersham (born 1977), American sports writer
- Victor Wickersham (1906–1988), American politician from Oklahoma

== See also ==
- Wickersham Commission (1929), investigated prohibition and its policing
- Operation Wickersham, a series of operations during the Iraq War
- MV Wickersham, a mainline ferry vessel for the Alaska Marine Highway
