= R. C. Owens =

American football player (1934–2012)

- Owens in 1961

No. 27, 37
- Positions: Wide receiver, halfback

Personal information
- Born: November 12, 1934; Shreveport, Louisiana, U.S.
- Died: June 17, 2012 (aged 77); Manteca, California, U.S.
- Listed height: 6 ft 3 in (1.91 m)
- Listed weight: 197 lb (89 kg)

Career information
- High school: Santa Monica (Santa Monica, California)
- College: College of Idaho
- NFL draft: 1956: 14th round, 160th overall pick

Career history
- San Francisco 49ers (1957–1961); Baltimore Colts (1962–1963); New York Giants (1964)

Awards and highlights
- Second-team All-Pro (1960); San Francisco 49ers Hall of Fame; First-team Little All-American (1954)

Career NFL statistics
- Receptions: 206
- Receiving yards: 3,285
- Receiving touchdowns: 22
- Stats at Pro Football Reference

Raleigh Climon Owens (November 12, 1934 – June 17, 2012), universally known by his initials "R.C.", was an American professional football player who was a wide receiver and halfback from 1957 through 1964 in the National Football League (NFL).

Owens, a skilled basketball player with excellent jumping ability, is credited as the innovator behind the "jump ball in the end zone" pass play, popularly known at the time as the "Alley Oop."

== Early life ==
R.C. Owens was born November 12, 1934, in Shreveport, Louisiana.

Owens graduated from Santa Monica High School in Santa Monica, California, and attended the College of Idaho (where his roommate and teammate was Elgin Baylor). Although only 6'3", Owens possessed long arms and extraordinary leaping ability, averaging nearly 28 rebounds per game as a sophomore.

He also played amateur basketball with the Seattle-based Buchan Bakers the year after their national championship.

== Professional career ==
Owens was selected in the 14th round of the 1956 NFL draft by the San Francisco 49ers, who made him the 160th player taken overall.

It was not long before Owens gained recognition on the gridiron for his unique receiving skills, becoming famous for leaping "Alley Oop" receptions of high passes by quarterback Y. A. Tittle.

The play, later known as "West Four right" in the 49ers playbook, came about accidentally in the fourth exhibition game of the 1959 season when quarterback Y.A. Tittle, under heavy pressure from a Chicago Cardinals pass rush, attempted to throw the ball away through the back of the end zone. Rookie Owens, one of the nation's top rebounders as a college basketball player, leaped high for the ball and grabbed it, pulling it down for a touchdown. The play would ultimately be used for three game-winning touchdowns in 1957, helping the Niners to an 8–4 record and their first playoff appearance since coming to the NFL in 1950.

"You know any teenagers? Even they could throw that pass," Tittle later recalled of the Alley Oop play. "You just throw it up in the air and hope."

Origins of the "Alley Oop" moniker are uncertain, although it clearly derived from the Alley Oop comic strip launched in the 1930s. According to Owens, the name came from one of three people — veteran quarterback Tittle, young quarterback John Brodie, or head coach Red Hickey. "I don't know who said it, but it became part of the nomenclature," Owens recalled in a 2011 interview. "You started hearing it in basketball, everywhere. Even when I see a baseball player go up and get a ball, I say, 'He made an Alley Oop.'"

Owens's best year in the NFL came in 1961, when he snared 55 passes for 1,032 yards and 5 touchdowns.

After playing four years for the 49ers under terms of the standardized league contract, he refused to sign in year five, incurring an automatic pay cut for the year but gaining free agency in the process. He signed a free agent contract with the Baltimore Colts for 1962 — the last such NFL free agent signing before the Rozelle rule was adopted in 1963.

Owens was used sparingly in 1962, filling a reserve role for Hall of Fame wide receiver Raymond Berry. His season highlight came in the fifth game of the season against the Cleveland Browns, when he hauled down six passes, two for touchdowns, as part of a 36–14 rout of Paul Brown's squad. He also made a legendary play blocking a 40-yard field goal attempt by the Washington Redskins in the season's penultimate game by standing on the goal line and leaping at the last second to reject the fading kick. The next season such "goal tending" was made illegal.

On his way to Colts training camp for the 1963 Baltimore Colts season, Owens was involved in an automobile accident that left him with serious injuries. Owens was severely hampered in the aftermath and he found his way into just three games during the entire 1963 season. He finished his career with the New York Giants in 1964, finding his way into 11 games but managing to catch just 4 balls for 45 yards.

The 30-year old Owens seemed on track to play one more season with the Giants in 1965, being listed on the team's preseason roster, but on Tuesday, August 10 he abruptly announced his retirement from the NFL, citing business opportunities with the public relations department of the J.C. Penney Company — a firm which he had worked for in such a capacity during the off-season in the latter part of his playing career.

== Life after football ==
Owens played four games for the 1961-1962 San Francisco Saints of the American Basketball League.

After his playing career was over, Owens worked for 24 years for the 49ers in their front office in several positions, including director of training camp and director of alumni relations. He later made his home in Manteca, part of San Joaquin County, where he launched a successful children's reading program.

== Death and legacy ==
Owens battled kidney issues over the last two decades of his life. He died of kidney failure at Manteca, California on June 17, 2012. He was 77 years old at the time of his death.

Owens was inducted into the San Francisco 49ers Hall of Fame in 2011. At the time of his passing he was remembered by 49ers CEO Jed York as a valuable community asset and "tremendous ambassador for our team".

== NFL career statistics ==
Year	Team	Games		Receiving				
Year	Team	GP	GS	Rec	Yds	Avg	Lng	TD
1957	SF	12	12	27	395	14.6	46	5
1958	SF	12	10	40	620	15.5	48	1
1959	SF	12	2	17	347	20.4	75	3
1960	SF	12	10	37	532	14.4	42	6
1961	SF	14	13	55	1,032	18.8	54	5
1962	BAL	14	2	25	307	12.3	26	2
1963	BAL	3	0	1	7	7.0	7	0
1964	NYG	11	1	4	45	11.3	14	0
Career		90	50	206	3,285	15.9	75	22
