= Seth Wickersham =

American sports journalist (born 1977)

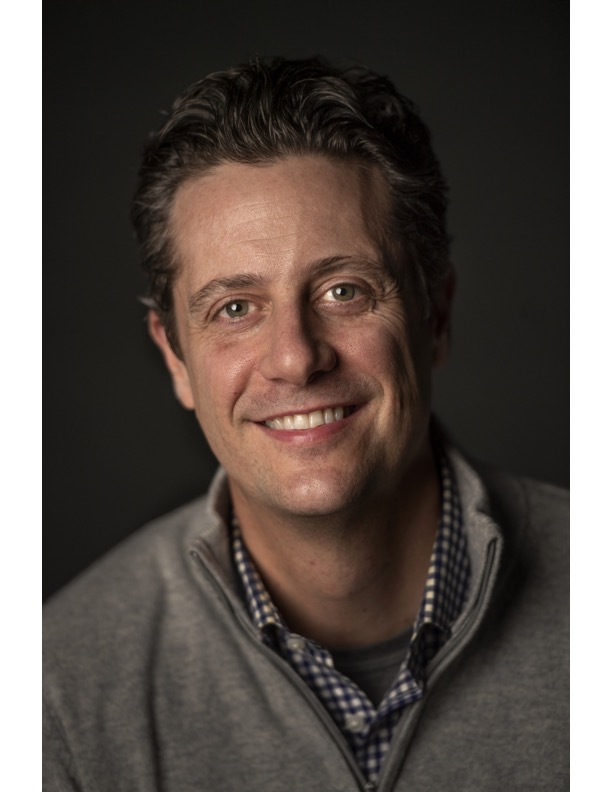
- Seth Wickersham
- Born: 1977 (age 48–49); Denver, Colorado, U.S.
- Education: University of Missouri (BJ)
- Occupations: Journalist, author
- Years active: 2000–present
- Employer: ESPN
- Notable work: It's Better to Be Feared: The New England Patriots Dynasty and the Pursuit of Greatness American Kings: A Biography of the Quarterback Andrew Luck Finally Reveals Why He Walked Away from the NFL
- Children: 2

Seth Wickersham (born 1977) is an American sports journalist for ESPN and ESPN The Magazine.

== Early life and education ==
Wickersham was born in Denver, and raised in Boulder and Anchorage, Alaska and attended Robert Service High School. He graduated from the University of Missouri with a bachelor of journalism in 2000. While an undergraduate, Wickersham covered Super Bowl XXXIV, won by the St. Louis Rams, with Wright Thompson for the Columbia Missourian.

== Career ==
After graduating from the University of Missouri, Wickersham joined ESPN, writing for ESPN.com and ESPN The Magazine. His work primarily covers the National Football League and has been featured on Outside the Lines, SportsCenter, and E:60.

Wickersham's stories have gained fame for their deep coverage of previously unreported news. Along with Don Van Natta, Wickersham has written critically acclaimed investigations on the NFL's handling of the Spygate and Deflategate cheating controversies, the Rams and Raiders franchise relocations, and the behind-closed-doors meetings on the inequality protests. Over the course of his career, Wickersham has also profiled prominent NFL personalities including Tom Brady, Peyton Manning, Bill Belichick, and Y.A. Tittle.

An October 2022 story by Wickersham, Tisha Thompson, and Don Van Natta Jr. is credited for contributing to forcing former Washington Commanders owner Dan Snyder to sell the franchise. In December 2022, Wickersham detailed Andrew Luck’s shock 2019 decision to retire from the NFL, the first time Luck had spoken about it.

In 2018, Wickersham was a finalist for the National Magazine Award for Reporting. His stories have been anthologized in the Best American Magazine Writing, the Best American Sports Writing, The Year's Best Sports Writing Next Wave: America's New Generation of Great Literary Journalists, and in Words Matter: Writing to Make a Difference. He has won awards from the National Association of Black Journalists and the Pro Football Writers Association. In 2023, Wickersham and Van Natta were named The Big Lead's Sportswriter of the Year.

Wickersham’s first book, It’s Better to Be Feared: The New England Patriots Dynasty and the Pursuit of Greatness, was released on October 12, 2021. The book became a New York Times bestseller and was named Nonfiction Book of the Year by Sports Illustrated and the National Sports Media Association.

Wickersham's second book, American Kings: A Biography of the Quarterback, was published on September 9, 2025. It also became a New York Times bestseller.

== Personal life ==
Wickersham and his wife have two children. They live in Connecticut.

Wickersham's cousin is comedian and actor Nick Swardson. Swardson reportedly helped Wickersham prepare for a brief role in the 2014 film Draft Day, though Wickersham's scene was eventually cut.

== Bibliography ==
- It's Better to Be Feared: The New England Patriots Dynasty and the Pursuit of Greatness (Liveright, 2021)
- American Kings: A Biography of the Quarterback (Penguin, 2025)
