= Y. A. Tittle =

American football player (1926–2017)

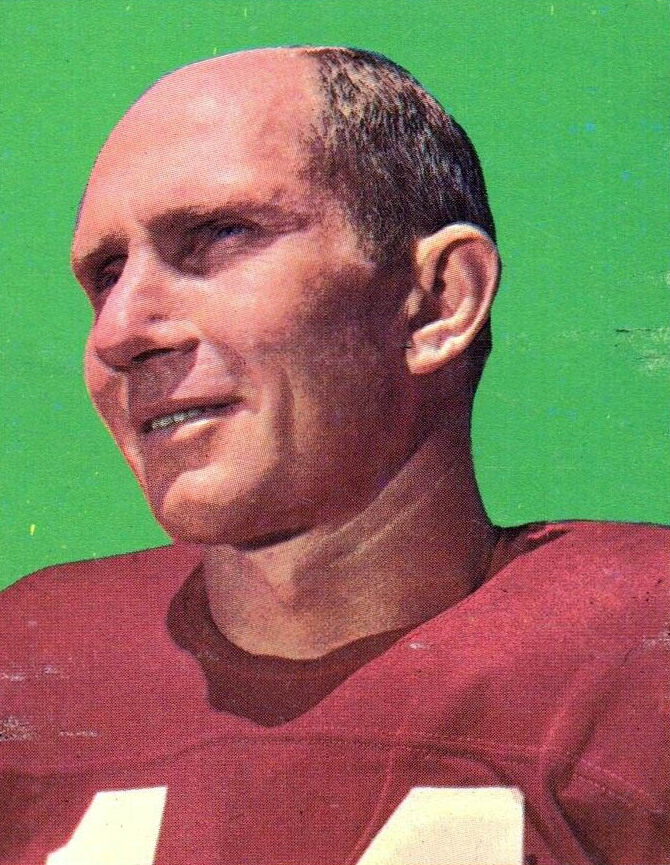
- Tittle, c. 1960

No. 63, 64, 14
- Position: Quarterback

Personal information
- Born: October 24, 1926; Marshall, Texas, U.S.
- Died: October 8, 2017 (aged 90); Stanford, California, U.S.
- Listed height: 6 ft 0 in (1.83 m)
- Listed weight: 192 lb (87 kg)

Career information
- High school: Marshall
- College: LSU (1944–1947)
- NFL draft: 1948: 1st round, 6th overall pick

Career history
- Baltimore Colts (1948–1950); San Francisco 49ers (1951–1960); New York Giants (1961–1964)

Awards and highlights
- NFL Most Valuable Player (1963); 3× First-team All-Pro (1957, 1962, 1963); 7× Pro Bowl (1953, 1954, 1957, 1959, 1961–1963); 3× NFL passing touchdowns leader (1955, 1962, 1963); 2× NFL completion percentage leader (1957, 1963); NFL passer rating leader (1963); San Francisco 49ers Hall of Fame; New York Giants Ring of Honor; New York Giants No. 14 retired; 12th greatest New York Giant of all-time; 2× First-team All-SEC (1946, 1947); NFL record: 7 touchdown passes in a game (tied)

Career NFL/AAFC (Note: As of 2025, statistics and records accumulated in the All-America Football Conference are recognized by the NFL.) statistics
- Passing attempts: 4,395
- Passing completions: 2,427
- Completion percentage: 55.2%
- TD–INT: 242–248
- Passing yards: 33,070
- Passer rating: 74.3
- Rushing yards: 1,245
- Rushing touchdowns: 39
- Stats at Pro Football Reference
- Pro Football Hall of Fame

Yelberton Abraham Tittle Jr. (October 24, 1926 – October 8, 2017) was an American professional football quarterback who played in the National Football League (NFL) for the San Francisco 49ers and New York Giants; he also played for the original Baltimore Colts of the All-America Football Conference (AAFC) (Note: Not to be confused with the better-known Baltimore Colts of the NFL, founded in 1953) until the franchise folded a year after joining the NFL. Known for his competitiveness and leadership, Tittle was the centerpiece of several prolific offenses throughout his 17-year professional career from 1948 to 1964.

Tittle played college football for Louisiana State University, where he was a two-time All-Southeastern Conference (SEC) quarterback for the LSU Tigers football team. As a junior, he was named the most valuable player (MVP) of the infamous 1947 Cotton Bowl Classic—also known as the "Ice Bowl"—a scoreless tie between the Tigers and Arkansas Razorbacks in a snowstorm. After college, he was drafted in the 1947 NFL draft by the Detroit Lions, but he instead chose to play in the AAFC for the Colts.

With the Colts, Tittle was named the AAFC Rookie of the Year in 1948 after leading the team to the AAFC playoffs. After consecutive one-win seasons, the Colts franchise folded, which allowed Tittle to be drafted in the 1951 NFL draft by the 49ers. Through ten seasons in San Francisco, he was invited to four Pro Bowls, led the league in touchdown passes in 1955, and was named the NFL Player of the Year by the United Press in 1957. A groundbreaker, Tittle was part of the 49ers' famed Million Dollar Backfield, was the first professional football player featured on the cover of Sports Illustrated, and is credited with having coined "alley-oop" as a sports term.

Considered washed-up, the 34-year-old Tittle was traded to the Giants following the 1960 season. Over the next four seasons, he won several individual awards, twice set the league single-season record for touchdown passes – including a 1962 game with a combined 7 touchdown passes and 500-yards passing with a near perfect (151.4 out of 158.33) passer rating, and led the Giants to three straight NFL championship games. Although he was never able to deliver a championship to the team, Tittle's time in New York is regarded among the glory years of the franchise.

In his final season, Tittle was photographed bloodied and kneeling down in the end zone after a tackle by Pittsburgh Steelers defensive lineman John Baker left him helmetless. The photograph is considered one of the most iconic images in North American sports history. He retired as the NFL's all-time leader in passing yards, passing touchdowns, attempts, completions, and games played. Tittle was inducted into the Pro Football Hall of Fame in 1971, and his jersey number 14 is retired by the Giants.

== Early life ==
Born and raised in Marshall, Texas, to Alma Tittle (née Allen) and Yelberton Abraham Tittle Sr., Tittle aspired to be a quarterback from a young age. He spent hours in his backyard throwing a football through a tire swing, emulating his fellow Texan and boyhood idol, Sammy Baugh. Tittle played high school football at Marshall High School. In his senior year the team posted an undefeated record and reached the state finals.

== College career ==
After a recruiting battle between Louisiana State University and the University of Texas, Tittle chose to attend LSU in Baton Rouge, Louisiana, and play for the LSU Tigers. He was part of a successful 1944 recruiting class under head coach Bernie Moore that included halfbacks Jim Cason, Dan Sandifer, and Ray Coates. Freshmen were eligible to play on the varsity during World War II, so Tittle saw playing time immediately. He later said the finest moment of his four years at LSU was beating Tulane as a freshman, a game in which he set a school record with 238 passing yards. It was one of two games the Tigers won that season.

Moore started Tittle at tailback in the single-wing formation his first year, but moved him to quarterback in the T formation during his sophomore season. As a junior in 1946, Tittle's three touchdown passes in a 41–27 rout of rival Tulane helped ensure LSU a spot in the Cotton Bowl Classic. Known notoriously as the "Ice Bowl", the 1947 Cotton Bowl pitted LSU against the Arkansas Razorbacks in sub-freezing temperatures on an ice-covered field in Dallas, Texas. LSU moved the ball much better than the Razorbacks, but neither team was able to score, and the game ended in a scoreless tie. Tittle and Arkansas end Alton Baldwin shared the game's MVP award. Following the season, United Press International (UPI) placed Tittle on its All-Southeastern Conference (SEC) first-team.

UPI again named Tittle its first-team All-SEC quarterback in 1947. In Tittle's day of iron man football, he played on both offense and defense. While on defense during a 20–18 loss to SEC champion Ole Miss in his senior season, Tittle's belt buckle was torn off as he intercepted a pass from Charlie Conerly and broke a tackle. He ran down the sideline with one arm cradling the ball and the other holding up his pants. At the Ole Miss 20-yard line, as he attempted to stiff-arm a defender,(#87 Jack Odom), Tittle's pants fell and he tripped and fell onto his face. The fall kept him from scoring the game-winning touchdown.

In total, during his college career Tittle set school passing records with 162 completions out of 330 attempts for 2,525 yards and 23 touchdowns. He scored seven touchdowns himself as a runner. His passing totals remained unbroken until Bert Jones surpassed them in the 1970s.

== Professional career ==
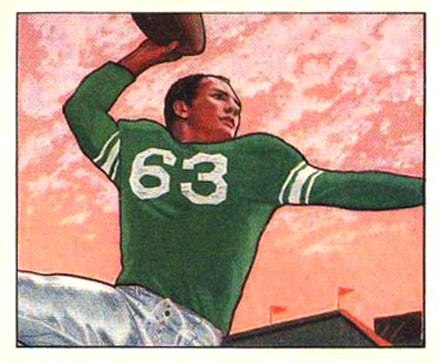
Tittle with the Colts, depicted on his rookie card from 1950 Bowman Football

=== Baltimore Colts ===
Tittle was the sixth overall selection of the 1948 NFL draft, taken by the Detroit Lions. However, Tittle instead signed his first professional contract with the Cleveland Browns of the All-America Football Conference in 1948 to back up Otto Graham for what was expected to be Graham's last season; however, before the start of the 1948 season, AAFC commissioner Jonas Ingram, in an effort to increase balance in the AAFC, took several players from the Browns (including Tittle) and the New York Yankees (who had met in the league's first two championship games) and sent them to the Baltimore Colts, which is where Tittle began his pro career. That season, already being described as a "passing ace", he was unanimously recognized as the AAFC Rookie of the Year by UPI after passing for 2,739 yards and leading the Colts to the brink of an Eastern Division championship. After a 1–11 win–loss record in 1949, the Colts joined the National Football League in 1950. The team again posted a single win against eleven losses, and the franchise folded after the season due to financial difficulties. Players on the roster at the time of the fold were eligible to be drafted in the next NFL draft.

=== San Francisco 49ers ===
Tittle was then drafted by the San Francisco 49ers in the 1951 NFL draft after the Colts folded. While many players at the time were unable to play immediately due to military duties, Tittle had received a class IV-F exemption due to physical ailments, so he was able to join the 49ers roster that season. In 1951 and 1952, he shared time at quarterback with Frankie Albert. In 1953, his first full season as the 49ers' starter, he passed for 2,121 yards and 20 touchdowns and was invited to his first Pro Bowl. San Francisco finished with a 9–3 regular season record, which was good enough for second in the Western Conference, and led the league in points scored.

In 1954, the 49ers compiled their Million Dollar Backfield, which was composed of four future Hall of Famers: Tittle; fullbacks John Henry Johnson and Joe Perry; and halfback Hugh McElhenny. "It made quarterbacking so easy because I just get in the huddle and call anything and you have three Hall of Fame running backs ready to carry the ball," Tittle reminisced in 2006. The team had aspirations for a championship run, but injuries, including McElhenny's separated shoulder in the sixth game of the season, ended those hopes and the 49ers finished third in the Western Division. Tittle starred in his second straight Pro Bowl appearance as he threw two touchdown passes, including one to 49ers teammate Billy Wilson, who was named the game's MVP.

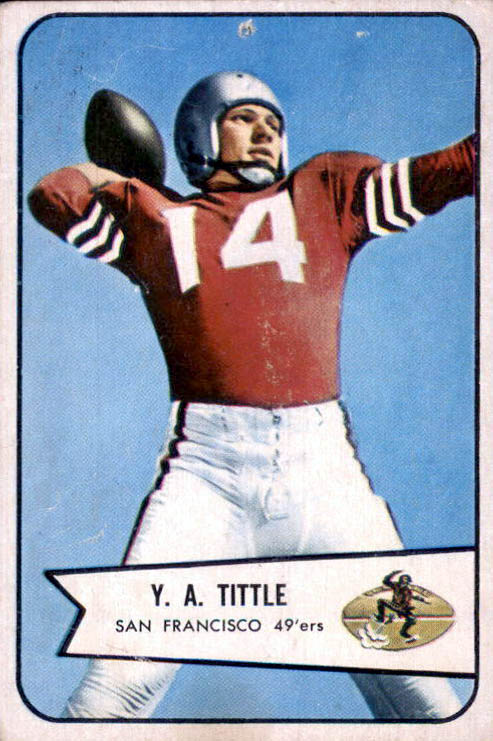
Tittle on a 1954 trading card

Tittle became the first professional football player featured on the cover of Sports Illustrated when he appeared on its 15th issue dated November 22, 1954, donning his 49ers uniform and helmet featuring an acrylic face mask distinct to the time period. The cover photo also shows a metal bracket on the side of Tittle's helmet which served to protect his face by preventing the helmet from caving in. The 1954 cover was the first of four Sports Illustrated covers he graced during his career.

Tittle led the NFL in touchdown passes for the first time in 1955, with 17, while also leading the league with 28 interceptions thrown. When the 49ers hired Frankie Albert as head coach in 1956, Tittle was pleased with the choice at first, figuring Albert would be a good mentor. However, the team lost four of its first five games, and Albert replaced Tittle with rookie Earl Morrall. After a loss to the Los Angeles Rams brought San Francisco's record to 1–6, Tittle regained the starting role and the team finished undefeated with one tie through the season's final five games.

In 1957, Tittle and receiver R. C. Owens devised a pass play in which Tittle tossed the ball high into the air and the 6 ft 3 in (1.91 m) Owens leapt to retrieve it, typically resulting in a long gain or a touchdown. Tittle dubbed the play the "alley-oop"—the first usage of the term in sports—and it was highly successful when utilized. The 49ers finished the regular season with an 8–4 record and hosted the Detroit Lions in the Western Conference playoff. Against the Lions, Tittle passed for 248 yards and tossed three touchdown passes—one each to Owens, McElhenny, and Wilson—but Detroit overcame a 20-point third quarter deficit to win 31–27. For the season, Tittle had a league-leading 63.1 completion percentage, threw for 2,157 yards and 13 touchdowns, and rushed for six more scores. He was deemed "pro player of the year" by a United Press poll of members of the National Football Writers Association. Additionally, he was named to his first All-Pro team and invited to his third Pro Bowl.

After a poor 1958 preseason by Tittle, Albert started John Brodie at quarterback for the 1958 season, a decision that proved unpopular with the fan base. Tittle came in to relieve Brodie in a week six game against the Lions, with ten minutes left in the game and the 49ers down 21–17. His appearance "drew a roar of approval from the crowd of 59,213," after which he drove the team downfield and threw a 32-yard touchdown pass to McElhenny for the winning score. San Francisco finished with a 7–5 record, which was then followed by Albert's resignation as coach; Red Hickey became head coach. Tittle and Brodie continued to share time at quarterback over the next two seasons. A right knee ligament injury against the Colts in week nine hindered Tittle in 1959 to where he missed two weeks. In his fourth and final Pro Bowl game with the 49ers in 1959, Tittle completed 13 of 17 passes for 178 yards and a touchdown.

Under new head coach Red Hickey in 1960, the 49ers adopted the shotgun formation. The first implementation of the shotgun was in week nine against the Colts, with Brodie at quarterback while Tittle nursed a groin injury. The 49ers scored a season-high thirty points, and with Brodie in the shotgun won three of their last four games to salvage a winning season at 7–5. Though conflicted, Tittle decided to get into shape and prepare for the next season. He stated in his 2009 autobiography that at times he thought, "The hell with it. Quit this damned game. You have been at it too long anyway." But then another voice within him would say, "Come back for another year and show them you're still a good QB. Don't let them shotgun you out of football!" However, after the first preseason game of 1961, Hickey informed Tittle he had been traded to the New York Giants.

=== New York Giants ===
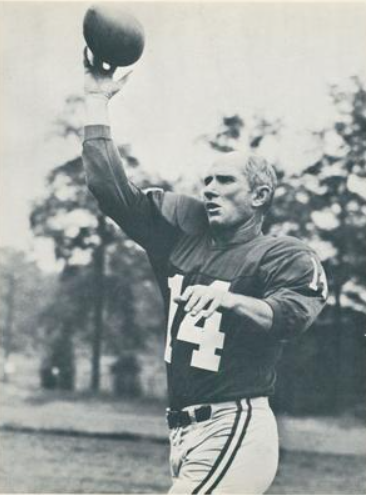
1963 Sports Service photo of Tittle for New York Giants

In mid-August 1961, the 49ers traded the 34-year-old Tittle to the New York Giants for second-year guard Lou Cordileone. Cordileone, the 12th overall pick in the 1960 NFL draft, was quoted as reacting "Me, even up for Y. A. Tittle? You're kidding," and later remarked that the Giants traded him for "a 42-year-old quarterback." Tittle's view of Cordileone was much the same, stating his dismay that the 49ers did not get a "name ballplayer" in return. He was also displeased with being traded to the East Coast, and said he would rather have been traded to the Los Angeles Rams.

Already considered washed up, Tittle was intended by the Giants to share quarterback duties with 40-year-old Charlie Conerly, who had been with the team since 1948. The players at first remained loyal to Conerly, and treated Tittle with the cold shoulder. Tittle missed the season opener due to a back injury sustained before the season. His first game with New York came in week two, against the Steelers, in which he and Conerly each threw a touchdown pass in the Giants' 17–14 win. He became the team's primary starter for the remainder of the season and led the revitalized Giants to first place in the Eastern Conference. The Newspaper Enterprise Association (NEA) awarded Tittle its Jim Thorpe Trophy as the NFL's players' choice of MVP. In the 1961 NFL Championship Game, the Giants were soundly defeated by Vince Lombardi's Green Bay Packers, as they were shut out 37–0. Tittle completed six of 20 passes in the game and threw four interceptions.

In January 1962, Tittle stated his intention to retire following the 1962 season. After an off-season quarterback competition with Ralph Guglielmi, Tittle played and started in a career-high 14 games. He tied an NFL record by throwing seven touchdown passes in a game on October 28, 1962, in a 49–34 win over the Washington Redskins. Against the Dallas Cowboys in the regular season finale, Tittle threw six touchdown passes to set the single-season record with 33, which had been set the previous year by Sonny Jurgensen's 32. He earned player of the year honors from the Washington D.C. Touchdown Club, UPI, and The Sporting News, and finished just behind Green Bay's Jim Taylor in voting for the AP NFL Most Valuable Player Award. The Giants again finished first in the Eastern Conference and faced the Packers in the 1962 NFL Championship Game. In frigid, windy conditions at Yankee Stadium and facing a constant pass rush from the Packers' front seven, Tittle completed only 18 of his 41 attempts in the game. The Packers won, 16–7, with New York's lone score coming on a blocked punt recovered in the end zone by Jim Collier.

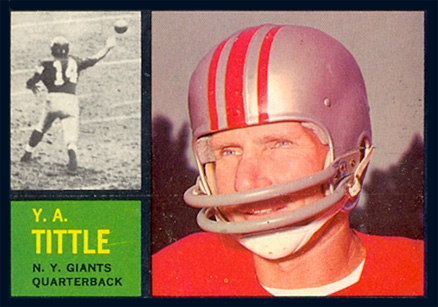
Tittle on a 1962 trading card

Tittle returned to the Giants in 1963 and, at age 37, supplanted his single-season passing touchdowns record by throwing 36. He broke the record in the final game with three touchdowns against the Steelers, three days after being named NFL MVP by the AP. The Giants led the league in scoring by a wide margin, and for the third time in as many years clinched the Eastern Conference title. The Western champions were George Halas' Chicago Bears. The teams met in the 1963 NFL Championship Game at Wrigley Field. In the second quarter, Tittle injured his knee on a tackle by Larry Morris, and required a novocaine shot at halftime to continue playing. After holding a 10–7 halftime lead, The Giants were shutout in the second half, during which Tittle threw four interceptions. Playing through the knee injury, he completed 11 of 29 passes in the game for 147 yards, a touchdown, and five interceptions as the Bears won 14–10.

The following year in 1964, Tittle's final season, the Giants went 2–10–2 (.214), the worst record in the 14-team league. In the second game of the year, against Pittsburgh, he was blindsided by defensive end John Baker. The tackle left Tittle with crushed cartilage in his ribs, a cracked sternum, and a concussion. However, he played in every game the rest of the season, but was relegated to a backup role later in the year. After throwing only ten touchdowns with 22 interceptions, he retired after the season at age 39, saying rookie quarterback Gary Wood not only "took my job away, but started to ask permission to date my daughter." Over 17 seasons as a professional, Tittle completed 2,427 out of 4,395 passes for 33,070 yards and 242 touchdowns, with 248 interceptions. He also rushed for 39 touchdowns.

== Career statistics ==
Legend
	AP NFL MVP
	Led the league
**Bold**	Career high

Year	Team	Games			Passing									Rushing	
Year	Team	GP	GS	Cmp	Att	Pct	Yds	Avg	TD	Int	Rtg	Att	Yds	Avg	TD
1948	BAL	14	12	161	289	55.7	2,522	8.7	16	9	90.3	52	157	3.0	4
1949	BAL	11	7	148	289	51.2	2,209	7.6	14	18	66.8	29	89	3.1	2
1950	BAL	12	7	161	315	51.1	1,884	6.0	8	19	52.9	20	77	3.9	2
1951	SF	12	1	63	114	55.3	808	7.1	8	9	68.2	13	18	1.4	1
1952	SF	12	5	106	208	51.0	1,407	6.8	11	12	66.3	11	−11	−1.0	0
1953	SF	11	10	149	259	57.5	2,121	8.2	20	16	84.1	14	41	2.9	6
1954	SF	12	11	170	295	57.6	2,205	7.5	9	9	78.7	28	68	2.4	4
1955	SF	12	12	147	287	51.2	2,185	7.6	17	**28**	56.6	23	114	5.0	0
1956	SF	11	8	124	218	56.9	1,641	7.5	7	12	68.6	24	67	2.8	4
1957	SF	12	11	176	279	**63.1**	2,157	7.7	13	15	80.0	40	220	5.5	6
1958	SF	11	6	120	208	57.7	1,467	7.1	9	15	63.9	22	35	1.6	2
1959	SF	11	10	102	199	51.3	1,331	6.7	10	15	58.0	11	24	2.2	0
1960	SF	9	4	69	127	54.3	694	5.5	4	3	70.8	10	61	6.1	0
1961	NYG	13	11	163	285	57.2	2,272	8.0	17	12	85.3	25	85	3.4	3
1962	NYG	14	14	200	**375**	53.3	**3,224**	**8.6**	33	20	89.5	17	108	6.4	2
1963	NYG	13	13	**221**	367	60.2	3,145	**8.6**	**36**	14	**104.8**	18	99	5.5	2
1964	NYG	14	11	147	281	52.3	1,798	6.4	10	22	51.6	15	−7	−0.5	1
AAFC		25	19	309	578	53.4	4,731	8.2	30	27	78.6	81	246	3.0	6
NFL		179	133	2,118	3,817	55.5	28,339	7.4	212	221	73.6	291	999	3.4	33
Total		204	152	2,427	4,395	55.2	33,070	7.5	242	248	74.3	372	1,245	3.3	39

== Profile and playing style ==
Tittle has the attitude
of a high school kid, with
the brain of a computer.

— Frank Gifford

Tittle threw the ball from a sidearm, almost underhand position, something novel at those times, though it was common practice in earlier decades. It was this seemingly underhand style that drew the curiosity and admiration of many fans. This, in tandem with his baldness—for which he was frequently referred to as the "Bald Eagle"—made him a very striking personality. Despite his throwing motion, he had a very strong and accurate arm with a quick release. His ability to read defenses made him one of the best screen passers in the NFL. He was a perfectionist and highly competitive, and he expected the same of his teammates. He possessed rare leadership and game-planning skills, and played with great enthusiasm even in his later years. "Tittle has the attitude of a high school kid, with the brain of a computer," said Giants teammate Frank Gifford. Baltimore Colts halfback Lenny Moore, when asked in 1963 to compare Tittle and Colts quarterback Johnny Unitas, said:

I played with Tittle in the Pro Bowl two years ago, and I discovered he's quite a guy ... He and John, however, are entirely different types ... Tittle is a sort of 'con man' with his players ... he comes into a huddle and 'suggests' that maybe this or that will work on account of something he saw happen on a previous play ... The way he puts it, you're convinced it's a good idea and maybe it will work. John, now, he's a take-charge guy ... He tells you what the other guy's going to do, what he's going to do, and what he wants you to do.

Tittle's most productive years came when he was well beyond his athletic prime. He credited his ability to improve with age to a feel for the game borne from years of league experience. "If you could learn it by studying movies, a good, smart college quarterback could learn all you've got to learn in three weeks and then come in and be as good as the old heads," he told Sports Illustrated in 1963. "But they can't."

== Legacy ==
At the time of his retirement, Tittle held the following NFL records:

- Career passing yards (28,339)
- Career passing touchdowns (212)
- Career pass attempts (3,817)
- Career pass completions (2,118)
- Passing touchdowns in a season (36)
- Passing touchdowns in a game (7)
- Career total offense (29,338)
- Games played (176)

Tittle was the fourth player to throw seven touchdown passes in a game, when he did so in 1962 against the Redskins. He followed Sid Luckman (1943), Adrian Burk (1954), and George Blanda (1961). The feat has since been equaled by four more players: Joe Kapp (1969), Peyton Manning (2013), Nick Foles (2013), and Drew Brees (2015). Tittle, Manning and Foles did it without an interception. His 36 touchdown passes in 1963 set a record which stood for over two decades until it was surpassed by Dan Marino in 1984; as of 2025 it remains a Giants franchise record.

Despite record statistics and three straight championship game appearances, Tittle was never able to deliver a title to his team. His record as a starter in postseason games was 0–4. He threw four touchdown passes against 14 interceptions and had a passer rating of 33.8 in his postseason career, far below his regular season passer rating of 74.3. Seth Wickersham, writing for ESPN The Magazine in 2014, noted the dichotomy in the 1960s between two of New York's major sports franchises: "... Gifford, Huff and Tittle, a team of Hall of Famers known for losing championships as their peers on the Yankees—with whom they shared a stadium, a city, and many rounds of drinks—became renowned for winning them." The Giants struggled after Tittle's retirement, posting only two winning seasons from 1964 to 1980.

He made seven Pro Bowls, four first-team All-Pro teams, and four times was named the NFL's Most Valuable Player or Player of the Year: in 1957 and 1962 by the UPI; in 1961 by the NEA; and in 1963 by the AP and NEA. In a sports column in 1963, George Strickler for the Chicago Tribune remarked Tittle had "broken records that at one time appeared unassailable and he has been the hero of more second half rallies than Napoleon and the Harlem Globetrotters." He was featured on four Sports Illustrated covers: three during his playing career and one shortly after retirement. His first was with the 49ers in 1954. With the Giants, he graced covers in November 1961, and he was on the season preview issue for 1964; a two-page fold-out photo from the 1963 title game. Tittle was on a fourth cover in August 1965.

The trade of Tittle for Lou Cordileone is seen as one of the worst trades in 49ers history; it is considered one of the best trades in Giants franchise history. Cordileone played just one season in San Francisco.

=== Famous photo ===
Berman's photograph "immortalized Tittle in football lore as an image of the aging warrior who had finally fallen."

Mobley's photo, also showing Tittle kneeling

A photo of a dazed Tittle in the end zone taken by Morris Berman of the Pittsburgh Post-Gazette on September 20, 1964, is regarded among the most iconic images in the history of American sports and journalism. Tittle, in his 17th and final season, was photographed helmet-less, bloodied and kneeling immediately after having been knocked to the ground by John Baker of the Pittsburgh Steelers and throwing an interception that was returned for a touchdown at the old Pitt Stadium by rookie Chuck Hinton. He suffered a concussion and cracked sternum on the play, but went on to play the rest of the season.

Post-Gazette editors declined to publish the photo, looking for "action shots" instead, but Berman entered the image into contests where it took on a life of its own, winning a National Headliner Award. It is regarded as having changed the way that photographers look at sports, having shown the power of capturing a moment of reaction. It became one of three photos to hang in the lobby of the National Press Photographers Association headquarters, alongside Raising the Flag on Iwo Jima and the Hindenburg disaster. A copy has hung in the Pro Football Hall of Fame.

A similar photo by Dozier Mobley of the Associated Press, which shows Tittle looking forward rather than down, was published in the October 2, 1964, issue of Life magazine. After at first having failed to see the appeal of the image, Tittle eventually grew to embrace it, putting the Mobley version on the back cover of his 2009 autobiography. "That was the end of the road," he told the Los Angeles Times in 2008. "It was the end of my dream. It was over." Pittsburgh player John Baker, who hit Tittle right before the picture was taken, ran for sheriff in his native Wake County, North Carolina in 1978, and used the photo as a campaign tool. He was elected and went on to serve for 24 years. Tittle also held a fundraiser to assist Baker in his bid for a fourth term in 1989.

== Honors ==
In recognition of his high school and college careers, respectively, Tittle was inducted to the Texas Sports Hall of Fame in 1987 and the Louisiana Sports Hall of Fame in 1972.

Tittle was inducted into the Pro Football Hall of Fame with its 1971 class, which included contemporaries Jim Brown, Norm Van Brocklin, the late Vince Lombardi, and former Giants teammate Andy Robustelli. By virtue of his membership in the pro hall of fame, he was automatically inducted as a charter member of the San Francisco 49ers Hall of Fame in 2009.

The Giants had originally retired the number 14 jersey in honor of Ward Cuff, but Tittle requested and was granted the jersey number by Giants owner Wellington Mara when he joined the team. It was retired again immediately following his retirement, and is now retired in honor of both players. In 2010, Tittle became a charter member of the New York Giants Ring of Honor.

== Personal life ==
After his retirement, he rejoined the 49ers staff and served as an assistant coach before being hired by the Giants in 1970 as a quarterback mentor. During his NFL career, Tittle worked as an insurance salesman in the off-season. After retiring, he founded his own company, Y. A. Tittle Insurance & Financial Services. Tittle appeared on the October 9, 1961 episode of To Tell the Truth as one of three challengers. Tittle claimed to be hair stylist-weekend pro wrestler Richard Smith. Tittle received one vote from the four Celebrity Panelists (Johnny Carson).

Until his death, Tittle resided in Atherton, California. His wife Minnette died in 2012. They had three sons: Michael, Patrick and John, and a daughter, Dianne Tittle de Laet. Their daughter is a harpist and poet, and in 1995 she published a biography of her father titled Giants & Heroes: A Daughter's Memories of Y. A. Tittle.

In his later life, Tittle suffered from severe dementia, which adversely affected his memory and limited his conversation to a handful of topics. Tittle died on October 8, 2017, at a hospital in Stanford, California, of natural causes.

== See also ==
- List of dual-threat quarterback records
- List of 500-yard passing games in the National Football League
