= Alley-oop (American football) =

Type of American football play

Niners wide receiver R.C. Owens, a former college basketball rebounding star, created the alley-oop play as a rookie in 1957.

The alley-oop is an American football play in which the quarterback throws the ball high into the air, and another player jumps up and catches it. Named after V. T. Hamlin's comic strip character Alley Oop, the play was developed in 1957 by San Francisco 49ers players R. C. Owens and Y. A. Tittle. The play was highly successful due to Owens' 6'3" frame and ability to out-leap defenders.

Tittle said of the play: "With the Alley-Oop now considered to be a legitimate weapon, the only defense against it was a defensive back who could outleap R.C. – and at that time, no such animal existed in the NFL."

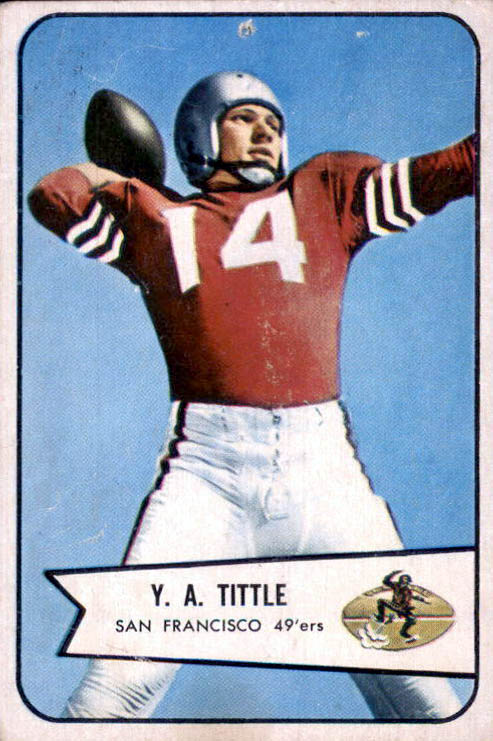
Y. A. Tittle tossed the original alley-oop pass.

According to the Oxford English Dictionary, the usage of the term in football predates its usage in basketball by two years, with the football counterpart also inspiring the play in basketball.

== See also ==
- Alley-oop (basketball)
- Hail Mary pass
