= Brosville, Virginia =

Unincorporated community in Virginia, US

Coordinates: 36°37′10″N 79°36′07″W

Brosville is an unincorporated community in Pittsylvania County, in the U.S. state of Virginia.

Brosville is located approximately 5 miles (8 km) west of the city limits of Danville along U.S. Route 58.
