= 1962 All-Pro Team =

List of Associated Press All-Pro Team players in 1962

The following is a list of players that were named to the Associated Press All-Pro Team in 1962. Players from the first and second teams are listed, with players from the first team in bold, where applicable.

== Teams ==
Offense
Position	Players
Quarterbacks	**Y. A. Tittle, New York** Bart Starr, Green Bay
Running backs	**Jim Taylor, Green Bay** **Don Perkins, Dallas**; Dick Bass, Los Angeles; Jim Brown, Cleveland; John David Crow, St. Louis; John Henry Johnson, Pittsburgh
Wide receivers	**Bobby Mitchell, Washington** **Del Shofner, New York**; Gail Cogdill, Detroit; Tommy McDonald, Philadelphia; Sonny Randle, St. Louis
Tight ends	**Ron Kramer, Green Bay** Mike Ditka, Chicago
Tackles	**Forrest Gregg, Green Bay** **Rosey Brown, New York**; Jack Stroud, New York; Mike McCormack, Cleveland; Bob St. Clair, San Francisco
Guards	**Jerry Kramer, Green Bay** **Jim Parker, Baltimore**; Jim Ray Smith, Cleveland; Fuzzy Thurston, Green Bay; Harley Sewell, Detroit; Mike Sandusky, Pittsburgh
Centers	**Jim Ringo, Green Bay** Ray Wietecha, New York; Buzz Nutter, Pittsburgh

Defense
Position	Players
Defensive ends	**Gino Marchetti, Baltimore** **Willie Davis, Green Bay**; Jim Katcavage, New York; Doug Atkins, Chicago; Bill Glass, Cleveland; Andy Robustelli, New York
Defensive tackles	**Roger Brown, Detroit** **Henry Jordan, Green Bay**; Alex Karras, Detroit; Bob Toneff, Washington; Bob Gain, Cleveland; Leo Nomellini, San Francisco
Outside Linebackers	**Bill Forester, Green Bay** **Dan Currie, Green Bay**; Galen Fiss, Cleveland; Joe Fortunato, Chicago; Bill Pellington, Baltimore
Inside Linebackers	**Joe Schmidt, Detroit** Matt Hazeltine, San Francisco; Ray Nitschke, Green Bay
Cornerbacks	**Night Train Lane, Detroit** **Herb Adderly, Green Bay**; Abe Woodson, San Francisco; Erich Barnes, New York; Jimmy Hill, St. Louis
Safety	**Yale Lary, Detroit** **Jimmy Patton, New York**; Willie Wood, Green Bay; Richie Petitbon, Chicago; Don Burroughs, Philadelphia; Clendon Thomas, Pittsburgh

Special teams
Position	Players
Kickers	Lou Michaels, Pittsburgh
Punters	Boyd Dowler, Green Bay
