= 1962 Cleveland Browns season =

NFL team season

- Head coach: Paul Brown
- Home stadium: Cleveland Stadium

Results
- Record: 7–6–1
- Division place: 3rd NFL Eastern
- Playoffs: Did not qualify
- All-Pros: 4: FB Jim Brown (2nd team); G Jim Ray Smith (2nd team); DT Bob Gain (2nd team); LB Galen Fiss (2nd team)
- Pro Bowlers: Bob Gain, DT; Mike McCormack, RT; Bill Glass, DE; Jim Brown, FB; Galen Fiss, LB; Jim Ray Smith, G

The 1962 Cleveland Browns season was the team's 13th season with the National Football League. It was the last with Paul Brown as head coach, as Art Modell fired him on January 9, 1963. One week later, Blanton Collier was named the second head coach of the Browns.

== Exhibition schedule ==
Week	Date	Opponent	Result	Record	Venue	Attendance	Sources
1	August 11	at Detroit Lions	L 14–17	0–1		34,241	
2	August 18	Pittsburgh Steelers	W 33–10	1–0	Cleveland Stadium	77,683	
3	August 25	vs. San Francisco 49ers	W 34–27	2–1	Multnomah Stadium (Portland, OR)	27,161	
4	September 1	at Los Angeles Rams	W 26–24	3–1		43,118	
5	September 7	at Chicago Bears	W 28–24	4–1		57,878	

There was a doubleheader on August 18, 1962, Cowboys vs Lions and Steelers vs Browns.

== Schedule ==
Game	Date	Opponent	Result	Record	Venue	Attendance	Recap	Sources
1	September 16	**New York Giants**	**W** 17–7	1–0	Cleveland Stadium	81,115	Recap	
2	September 23	**Washington Redskins**	**L** 16–17	1–1	Cleveland Stadium	57,491	Recap	
3	September 30	at **Philadelphia Eagles**	**L** 7–35	1–2	Franklin Field	60,671	Recap	
4	October 7	**Dallas Cowboys**	**W** 19–10	2–2	Cleveland Stadium	44,040	Recap	
5	October 14	Baltimore Colts	**L** 14–36	2–3	Cleveland Stadium	80,132	Recap	
6	October 21	at **St. Louis Cardinals**	**W** 34–7	3–3	Busch Stadium	23,256	Recap	
7	October 28	at **Pittsburgh Steelers**	**W** 41–14	4–3	Pitt Stadium	35,417	Recap	
8	November 4	**Philadelphia Eagles**	**T** 14–14	4–3–1	Cleveland Stadium	63,848	Recap	
9	November 11	at **Washington Redskins**	**L** 9–17	4–4–1	D.C. Stadium	48,169	Recap	
10	November 18	**St. Louis Cardinals**	**W** 38–14	5–4–1	Cleveland Stadium	41,815	Recap	
11	November 25	**Pittsburgh Steelers**	**W** 35–14	6–4–1	Cleveland Stadium	53,601	Recap	
12	December 2	at **Dallas Cowboys**	**L** 21–45	6–5–1	Cotton Bowl	24,226	Recap	
13	December 9	at **New York Giants**	**L** 13–17	6–6–1	Yankee Stadium	62,794	Recap	
14	December 15	at San Francisco 49ers	**W** 13–10	7–6–1	Kezar Stadium	35,274	Recap	
Note: Intra-conference opponents are in **bold** text.

== Week 1 ==
The Browns gave a record opening-day crowd of 81,115 at Cleveland Stadium something to remember in a 17–7 victory over the Giants. The game's most memorable play is a flea-flicker that set up a 29-yard Lou Groza field goal. Quarterback Jim Ninowski hands the ball to Jim Brown, who hands to receiver Ray Renfro, who hands the ball back to Ninowski, who completes a 53-yard pass to Rich Kreitling.

== Week 2 ==
Bobby Mitchell, traded by coach Paul Brown to Washington during the offseason, haunts his old team by scoring the winning touchdown in a 17–16 Redskins victory at Cleveland. With the Browns leading 16–10 late in the fourth quarter and trying to run out the clock, Jim Brown fumbles, giving the Redskins possession near midfield. Norm Snead throws a short pass to Mitchell, who races for the go-ahead touchdown. The Browns get two shots at a final-minute game-winning field goal, but both of Lou Groza's attempts are blocked.

== Week 5 ==
The Browns are beaten decisively by the Colts 36–14 at Cleveland Stadium. The Browns do not get a first down until the Colts had a 23–0 lead. Jim Brown had his worst rushing total ever: 11 yards on 14 attempts, with seven of those yards coming on one carry.

== Week 8 ==
In one of the uglier games played at Cleveland Stadium, the Browns and Philadelphia Eagles combine for eight turnovers and five missed field goals in a 14–14 tie. Jim Brown finishes with 69 rushing yards on 20 carries, his seventh consecutive game with fewer than 100 yards.

== Week 11 ==
Jim Brown, ending the longest 100-yard drought of his career at nine games, pounds for 110 in a 35–14 win over the Pittsburgh Steelers at Cleveland Stadium. Frank Ryan complements Brown by throwing for 284 yards and three touchdowns.

== Week 14 ==
In what would be the final game of Paul Brown's Cleveland coaching career, the Browns beat the San Francisco 49ers, 13–10 at Kezar Stadium. The Browns avoid their second losing season but cannot save their coach's job. Needing 139 yards for another 1,000-yard campaign, Jim Brown falls just short, ending the year at 996. Although Brown fails to win a rushing title for the first time in his career, he does lead the team in receiving for the first time, catching 47 passes for 517 yards and five touchdowns.

== Standings ==
NFL Eastern Conference
	W	L	T	PCT	CONF	PF	PA	STK
New York Giants	12	2	0	.857	10–2	398	283	W9
Pittsburgh Steelers	9	5	0	.643	8–4	312	363	W3
Cleveland Browns	7	6	1	.538	6–5–1	291	257	W1
Washington Redskins	5	7	2	.417	4–6–2	305	376	L1
Dallas Cowboys	5	8	1	.385	4–7–1	398	402	L2
St. Louis Cardinals	4	9	1	.308	4–7–1	287	361	W2
Philadelphia Eagles	3	10	1	.231	3–8–1	282	356	L2

Note: Tie games were not officially counted in the standings until 1972.

NFL Western Conference
	W	L	T	PCT	CONF	PF	PA	STK
Green Bay Packers	13	1	0	.929	11–1	415	148	W3
Detroit Lions	11	3	0	.786	10–2	315	177	L1
Chicago Bears	9	5	0	.643	8–4	321	287	W2
Baltimore Colts	7	7	0	.500	5–7	293	288	W2
San Francisco 49ers	6	8	0	.429	5–7	282	331	L2
Minnesota Vikings	2	11	1	.154	1–10–1	254	410	L3
Los Angeles Rams	1	12	1	.077	1–10–1	220	334	L3

Note: Tie games were not officially counted in the standings until 1972.

== Personnel ==
=== Roster ===
1962 Cleveland Browns roster
Quarterbacks: 16 John Furman; 13 Frank Ryan; Running backs: 32 Jim Brown; 49 Tommy Wilson; 36 Charley Scales; 48 Ernie Green; Wide receivers: 86 Gary Collins P; 42 Bobby Crespino; 88 Rich Kreitling; 26 Ray Renfro; Tight ends: 83 Johnny Brewer; 81 Leon Clarke	Offensive linemen: 70 John Brown T; 66 Gene Hickerson G; 74 Mike McCormack T; 56 John Morrow C; 53 Frank Morze C; 77 Dick Schafrath T; 64 Jim Ray Smith G; 60 John Wooten G; Defensive linemen: 79 Bob Gain DT; 80 Bill Glass DE; 82 Jim Houston DE; 78 Frank Parker DT; 72 Floyd Peters DT; 84 Paul Wiggin DE	Linebackers: 50 Vince Costello MLB; 35 Galen Fiss OLB; 52 Mike Lucci OLB; 54 Sam Tidmore MLB; Defensive backs: 20 Ross Fichtner FS; 46 Don Fleming SS; 30 Bernie Parrish CB; 40 Jim Shorter CB; 44 Jim Shofner CB; Special teams: 76 Lou Groza K	Reserve list: 15 Jim Ninowski QB (IR); 45 Ernie Davis RB (NF-Ill.); 24 Bobby Franklin S (IR); -- Chuck Hinton DT (IR); -- Stan Sczurek LB (IR); rookies in italics

=== Staff ===
1962 Cleveland Browns staff
Front office: Owner/CEO - Art Modell; Coaches: Head coach – Paul Brown; Offensive coaches: Running Backs - Blanton Collier; Offensive line – Fritz Heisler; Offensive backfield and ends – Paul Bixler	Defensive coaches: Defensive coordinator – Howard Brinker; Defensive line – Dick Evans; Linebackers – Ed Ulinski; Strength & Conditioning: Athletic Trainer - Leo Murphy; Equipment Manager - Morris Kono
