= Tom Adams (American football) =

American football player (born 1940)

Personal information
- Born: Thomas Frank Adams; April 26, 1940 (age 86) Keewatin, Minnesota, U.S.
- Height: 6 ft 5 in (196 cm)
- Weight: 220 lb (100 kg; 15 st 10 lb)
- Football career

Profile
- Position: Wide receiver

Career information
- High school: Kewatin (Keewatin, Minnesota)
- College: UMD (1958–1962)

Career history
- Minnesota Vikings (1962)

Awards and highlights
- 2× MIAC champion (1960, 1961)
- Stats at Pro Football Reference
- Basketball career

Career information
- College: UMD (1958–1962)
- Position: Forward

Career highlights
- 2× MIAC champion (1961, 1962)

Thomas Frank Adams (born April 26, 1940) is an American former professional football player who was a wide receiver for the Minnesota Vikings of the National Football League (NFL). Born in Keewatin, Minnesota, he attended Keewatin High School and the University of Minnesota–Duluth where he played both college football and basketball and won two Minnesota Intercollegiate Athletic Conference football championships. He played six times in the NFL for the Vikings in 1962, starting three times, (Note: Some sources claim he started 0 games while others claim he started 3 games.)he caught three receptions for 51 yards, with a long of 32 yards.

== Professional career ==
Frank would sign with the Minnesota Vikings on March 15, 1962.

Franks' first start would be on September 16, 1962 in Week 1 against the Green Bay Packers. He would record no catches in a 34–7 loss.

In Week 13 of that same season, Frank would record a career high 2 catches for 45 yards and his career long of 32 yards in a 37–23 loss to the Detroit Lions.

Frank would start in his final NFL game vs the Baltimore Colts on December 16th, 1962, catching the final catch of his career for 6 yards.

== NFL career statistics ==
Year	Team	Games		Receiving				
Year	Team	GP	GS	Rec	Yds	Avg	Lng	Td
1962	MIN	6	3	3	51	17	32	0
Career		6	3	3	51	17	32	0
