= 1962 Washington Redskins season =

NFL team season

- Owner: George Preston Marshall
- General manager: Bill McPeak
- Head coach: Bill McPeak
- Home stadium: D.C. Stadium

Results
- Record: 5–7–2
- Division place: 4th NFL Eastern
- Playoffs: Did not qualify

The 1962 Washington Redskins season was the franchise's 31st season in the National Football League (NFL) and their 26th in Washington, D.C. The team tried to improve on their 1–12–1 record from 1961 and did by going 5–7–2.

== Offseason ==
=== NFL draft ===
Ernie Davis was the first black player to be chosen first overall in the NFL draft.

1962 Washington Redskins draft
Round	Selection	Player	Position	College
1	1	Ernie Davis	Running back	Syracuse
2	15	Joe Hernandez	Wide receiver	Arizona
3	29	Bob Mitinger	Linebacker	Penn State
4	43	Billy Neighbors	Guard	Alabama
7	85	Bert Coan	Halfback	Kansas
8	99	Ron Hatcher	Fullback	Michigan State
9	113	Dave Viti	End	Boston University

== Preseason ==
Week	Date	Opponent	Result	Record	Venue	Attendance
1	August 11	at Los Angeles Rams	L 7–37	0–1	Los Angeles Memorial Coliseum	65,201
2	August 16	Baltimore Colts	L 14–34	0–2	D.C. Stadium	25,632
3	August 25	vs. Philadelphia Eagles	L 7–24	0–3	American Legion Memorial Stadium (Charlotte, NC)	22,500
4	September 1	Chicago Bears	W 29–28	1–3	Foreman Field (Norfolk, VA)	18,000
5	September 8	Green Bay Packers	L 14–20	1–4	A. J. McClung Memorial Stadium (Columbus, GA)	16,000

== Regular season ==
=== Schedule ===
Game	Date	Opponent	Result	Record	Venue	Attendance	Recap	Sources
1	September 16	at **Dallas Cowboys**	**T** 35–35	0–0–1	Cotton Bowl	15,730	Recap	
2	September 23	at **Cleveland Browns**	**W** 17–16	1–0–1	Cleveland Municipal Stadium	57,491	Recap	
3	September 30	**St. Louis Cardinals**	**W** 24–14	2–0–1	D.C. Stadium	37,419	Recap	
4	October 7	Los Angeles Rams	**W** 20–14	3–0–1	D.C. Stadium	18,104	Recap	
5	October 14	at **St. Louis Cardinals**	**T** 17–17	3–0–2	Busch Stadium	38,264	Recap	
6	October 21	at **Philadelphia Eagles**	**W** 27–21	4–0–2	Franklin Field	60,671	Recap	
7	October 28	at **New York Giants**	**L** 34–49	4–1–2	Yankee Stadium	62,844	Recap	
8	November 4	**Dallas Cowboys**	**L** 10–38	4–2–2	D.C. Stadium	49,888	Recap	
9	November 11	**Cleveland Browns**	**W** 17–9	5–2–2	D.C. Stadium	48,169	Recap	
10	November 18	at **Pittsburgh Steelers**	**L** 21–23	5–3–2	Forbes Field	21,231	Recap	
11	November 25	**New York Giants**	**L** 24–42	5–4–2	D.C. Stadium	49,219	Recap	
12	December 2	**Philadelphia Eagles**	**L** 14–37	5–5–2	D.C. Stadium	32,229	Recap	
13	December 8	at Baltimore Colts	**L** 21–34	5–6–2	Memorial Stadium	56,964	Recap	
14	December 16	**Pittsburgh Steelers**	**L** 24–27	5–7–2	D.C. Stadium	34,508	Recap	
Note: Intra-conference opponents are in **bold** text.

== Standings ==
NFL Eastern Conference
	W	L	T	PCT	CONF	PF	PA	STK
New York Giants	12	2	0	.857	10–2	398	283	W9
Pittsburgh Steelers	9	5	0	.643	8–4	312	363	W3
Cleveland Browns	7	6	1	.538	6–5–1	291	257	W1
Washington Redskins	5	7	2	.417	4–6–2	305	376	L1
Dallas Cowboys	5	8	1	.385	4–7–1	398	402	L2
St. Louis Cardinals	4	9	1	.308	4–7–1	287	361	W2
Philadelphia Eagles	3	10	1	.231	3–8–1	282	356	L2

Note: Tie games were not officially counted in the standings until 1972.

== Roster ==
1962 Washington Redskins roster
Quarterbacks (QB): 17 Galen Hall; 15 George Izo; 16 Norm Snead; Running backs (RB): 32 Billy Ray Barnes; 31 Don Bosseler; 30 Jim Cunningham; 36 Ron Hatcher; 22 Leroy Jackson; Wide receivers (WR): 87 Fred Dugan; 49 Bobby Mitchell; Tight ends (TE): 42 Bill Anderson P; 80 Steve Junker	Offensive linemen (OL): 50 Fred Hageman C; 73 Riley Mattson T; 70 Chuck Moore G; 62 John Nisby G; 61 Fran O'Brien T; 65 Vince Promuto G; Defensive linemen (DL): 75 Ben Davidson DT/DE; 74 Ed Khayat DT/DE; 86 John Paluck DE; 72 Joe Rutgens DT; 71 Andy Stynchula DE; 79 Bob Toneff DT	Linebackers (LB): 63 Rod Breedlove OLB; 85 Gene Cronin OLB/DE; 51 Gorden Kelley OLB; 55 Allen Miller MLB/OLB; Defensive backs (DB): 23 Claude Crabb CB; 48 Doug Elmore CB/P; 20 Bobby Freeman SS; 46 Dale Hackbart FS; 47 Dick James CB/SS/WR; 43 Jim Kerr FS; 41 Jim Steffen CB; Special teams (ST): 60 Robert Khayat K/G	Reserve: -- Bernie Darre G (DNR); 53 Bob Pellegrini LB (IR); Rookies in italics
