= 1962 Minnesota Vikings season =

NFL team season

- General manager: Bert Rose
- Head coach: Norm Van Brocklin
- Home stadium: Metropolitan Stadium

Results
- Record: 2–11–1
- Division place: 6th NFL Western
- Playoffs: Did not qualify
- Pro Bowlers: RB Tommy Mason

Uniform
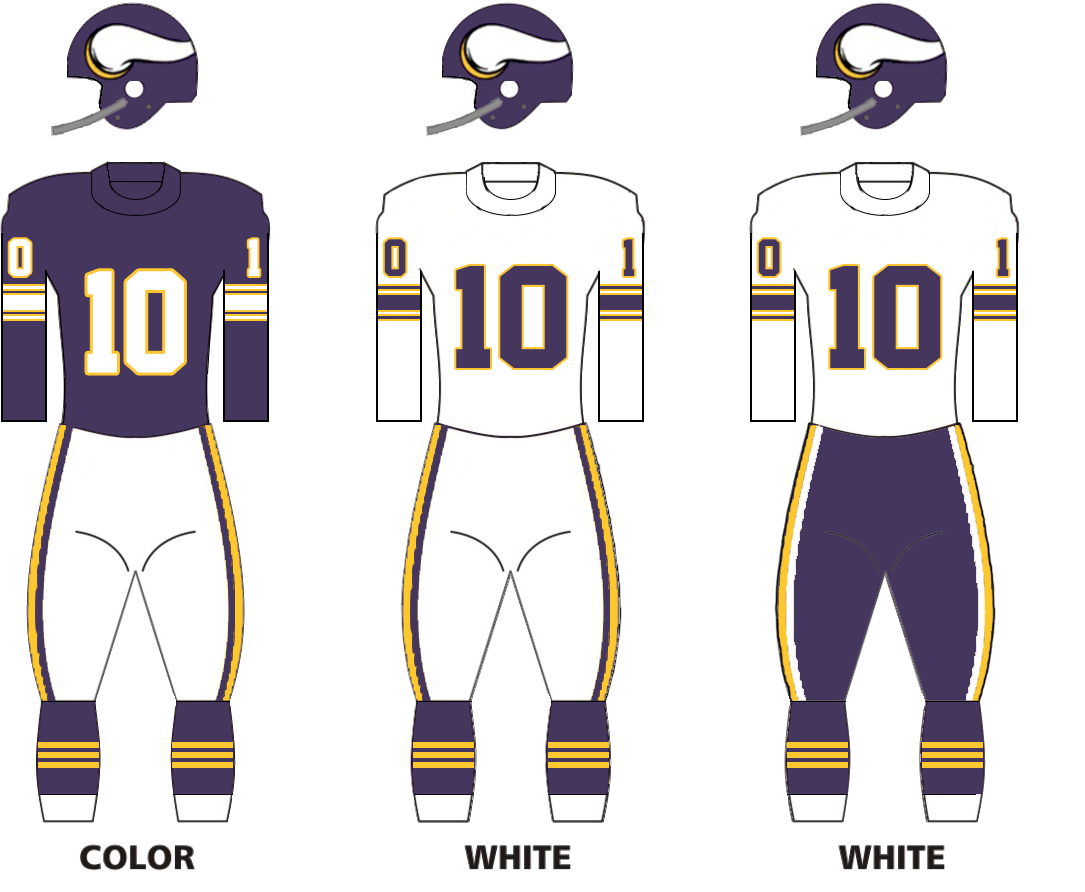

The 1962 season was the Minnesota Vikings' second in the National Football League. Under head coach Norm Van Brocklin, the team finished with a 2–11–1 record that still stands as the franchise's worst season record in terms of winning percentage, both by today's method of calculation (.179) and the method used at the time (.154), in which ties were not counted as games played. The Vikings have won at least three games in every season since.

== Offseason ==
=== 1962 draft ===
1962 Minnesota Vikings Draft
Draft order		Player name	Position	College
Round	Overall	Player name	Position	College
1	2	Traded to the New York Giants (Note: The Vikings traded their 1st-round selection (2nd overall) to the Giants in exchange for QB George Shaw.)		
2	17	Traded to the Cleveland Browns (Note: The Vikings traded their 2nd-round selection (17th overall) and 11th-round selection (142nd overall) to the Browns in exchange for DT Jim Prestel, DE Jim Marshall, LB Dick Grecni, RB Jamie Caleb, RB Billy Gault and DT Paul Dickson.)		
3	30	Bill Miller	Wide receiver	Miami (FL)
4	45	Roy Winston	Guard	LSU
5	58	Traded to the New York Giants (Note: The Vikings traded their 5th-round selection (58th overall) to the Giants in exchange for RB Mel Triplett, TE Bob Schnelker and OT Bob Schmidt.)		
6	73	Larry Bowie	Offensive tackle	Purdue
7	86	Traded to the Philadelphia Eagles (Note: The Vikings traded their 7th-round selection (86th overall) to the Eagles in exchange for TE Jerry Reichow.)		
8	101	Paul White	Running back	Florida
9	114	Marshall Shirk	Offensive tackle	UCLA
10	129	Traded to the Cleveland Browns (Note: The Vikings traded their 10th-round selection (129th overall) to the Browns in exchange for DE Bob Denton.)		
11	142	Traded to the Cleveland Browns		
12	157	Gary Fallon	Running back	Syracuse
13	170	Roger Van Cleef	Offensive tackle	Southwestern State
14	185	Patrick Russ	Offensive tackle	Purdue
15	198	Larry Guilford	End	Pacific
16	213	John Contoulis	Offensive tackle	Connecticut
17	226	Ron Staley	End	Wisconsin
18	241	Junior Hawthorne	Offensive tackle	Kentucky
19	254	Tommy Minter	Running back	Baylor
20	269	Terry Cagaanan	Running back	Utah State

== Roster ==
1962 Minnesota Vikings roster
Quarterbacks (QB): 15 John McCormick P; 10 Fran Tarkenton; Running backs (RB): 30 Bill Brown; 20 Tommy Mason; 35 Doug Mayberry; 39 Hugh McElhenny; 33 Mel Triplett; Wide receivers (WR): 85 Tom Adams; 84 Oscar Donahue; 88 Charley Ferguson; 41 Larry Guilford; Tight ends (TE): 87 Gordon Smith; 82 Steve Stonebreaker OLB	Offensive linemen (OL): 67 Grady Alderman T; 62 Bob Denton G/T; 65 Gerry Huth G; 73 Errol Linden T; 64 Mike Rabold G; 53 Mick Tingelhoff C; 72 Frank Youso T; Defensive linemen (DL): 61 Larry Bowie DE/DT; 76 Paul Dickson DT; 51 Jim Leo DE; 70 Jim Marshall DE; 79 Jim Prestel DT	Linebackers (LB): 36 Jim Christopherson K/OLB; 58 Rip Hawkins MLB; 55 Cliff Livingston OLB; 31 Clancy Osborne OLB; 60 Roy Winston MLB; Defensive backs (DB): 22 Bill Butler FS; 25 Dean Derby CB; 40 Tom Franckhauser CB; 21 Chuck Lamson SS; 45 Ed Sharockman CB; 26 Charlie Sumner FS; Special teams (ST)	Reserve: 27 Bobby Reed RB (IR); 89 Jerry Reichow WR (IR); Rookies in italics

== Preseason ==
Week	Date	Opponent	Result	Record	Venue	Attendance
1	August 11	at San Francisco 49ers	L 24–30	0–1	Husky Stadium (Seattle, WA)	22,500
2	August 18	at Los Angeles Rams	L 24–33	0–2	Multnomah Stadium (Portland, OR)	23,544
3	August 25	St. Louis Cardinals	L 21–24	0–3	Parade Stadium (Minneapolis)	15,500
4	September 2	Baltimore Colts	W 24–13	1–3	Metropolitan Stadium	27,227
5	September 8	Dallas Cowboys	W 45–26	2–3	Grady Stadium (Atlanta, GA)	12,500

== Regular season ==
=== Schedule ===
Week	Date	Opponent	Result	Record	Venue	Attendance
1	September 16	at **Green Bay Packers**	**L** 7–34	0–1	City Stadium	38,669
2	September 23	**Baltimore Colts**	**L** 7–34	0–2	Metropolitan Stadium	30,787
3	September 30	at **San Francisco 49ers**	**L** 7–21	0–3	Kezar Stadium	38,407
4	October 7	**Chicago Bears**	**L** 0–13	0–4	Metropolitan Stadium	33,141
5	October 14	**Green Bay Packers**	**L** 21–48	0–5	Metropolitan Stadium	41,475
6	October 21	at **Los Angeles Rams**	**W** 38–14	1–5	Los Angeles Memorial Coliseum	33,071
7	October 28	Philadelphia Eagles	**W** 31–21	2–5	Metropolitan Stadium	30,071
8	November 4	at Pittsburgh Steelers	**L** 31–39	2–6	Forbes Field	14,462
9	November 11	at **Chicago Bears**	**L** 30–31	2–7	Wrigley Field	46,984
10	November 18	**Detroit Lions**	**L** 6–17	2–8	Metropolitan Stadium	31,257
11	November 25	**Los Angeles Rams**	**T** 24–24	2–8–1	Metropolitan Stadium	26,728
12	December 2	**San Francisco 49ers**	**L** 12–35	2–9–1	Metropolitan Stadium	33,076
13	December 9	at **Detroit Lions**	**L** 23–37	2–10–1	Tiger Stadium	42,256
14	December 16	at **Baltimore Colts**	**L** 17–42	2–11–1	Memorial Stadium	53,645

Note: Intra-conference opponents are in bold text.

=== Standings ===
NFL Western Conference
	W	L	T	PCT	CONF	PF	PA	STK
Green Bay Packers	13	1	0	.929	11–1	415	148	W3
Detroit Lions	11	3	0	.786	10–2	315	177	L1
Chicago Bears	9	5	0	.643	8–4	321	287	W2
Baltimore Colts	7	7	0	.500	5–7	293	288	W2
San Francisco 49ers	6	8	0	.429	5–7	282	331	L2
Minnesota Vikings	2	11	1	.154	1–10–1	254	410	L3
Los Angeles Rams	1	12	1	.077	1–10–1	220	334	L3

Note: Tie games were not officially counted in the standings until 1972.

== Pro Bowl ==
Second-year halfback Tommy Mason was the only Viking voted to the East–West Pro Bowl game, played January 13, 1963, at the Los Angeles Memorial Coliseum and won by the East 30–20.

== Statistics ==
=== Team leaders ===
Category	Player(s)	Value
Passing yards	Fran Tarkenton	2,595
Passing touchdowns	Fran Tarkenton	22
Rushing yards	Tommy Mason	740
Rushing touchdowns	Tommy Mason; Fran Tarkenton; Mel Triplett	2
Receiving yards	Tommy Mason	603
Receiving touchdowns	Charley Ferguson; Tommy Mason	6
Points	Jim Christopherson	61
Kickoff return yards	Bill Butler	588
Punt return yards	Bill Butler	169
Interceptions	Ed Sharockman	6
Sacks	Jim Marshall	9

Note that sack totals from 1960 to 1981 are considered unofficial by the NFL

=== League rankings ===
Category	Total yards	Yards per game	NFL rank (out of 14)
Passing offense	2,216	158.3	11th
Rushing offense	1,864	133.1	6th
Total offense	4,080	291.4	12th
Passing defense	3,123	223.1	11th
Rushing defense	1,978	141.3	10th
Total defense	5,101	364.4	12th
