= List of Wichita State Shockers in the NFL draft =

This is a list of Wichita State Shockers football players in the NFL draft.

== Key ==
B	Back	K	Kicker	NT	Nose tackle
C	Center	LB	Linebacker	FB	Fullback
DB	Defensive back	P	Punter	HB	Halfback
DE	Defensive end	QB	Quarterback	WR	Wide receiver
DT	Defensive tackle	RB	Running back	G	Guard
E	End	T	Offensive tackle	TE	Tight end

== Selections ==
Year	Round	Pick	Player	Team	Position
1942	16	148	Keith Doggett	New York Giants	T
1943	15	139	Lyle Sturdy	Chicago Bears	B
1945	28	294	Al Fleming	Philadelphia Eagles	C
1948	25	232	Paul Hausser	Pittsburgh Steelers	T
1951	20	241	Jim Nutter	Los Angeles Rams	B
1953	24	286	Eli Romero	Philadelphia Eagles	B
1956	8	87	Vere Wellman	Pittsburgh Steelers	G
1956	10	114	Willis Towne	Chicago Cardinals	E
1957	15	171	Ed Hinman	Los Angeles Rams	B
1958	11	123	Harry Horton	Green Bay Packers	E
1960	4	40	Ted Dean	Philadelphia Eagles	RB
1960	20	234	George Hershberger	Pittsburgh Steelers	T
1961	2	24	Roland Lakes	San Francisco 49ers	C
1961	14	194	Nelson Toburen	Green Bay Packers	E
1962	20	279	Ron Turner	Philadelphia Eagles	E
1963	13	170	Alex Zyskowski	St. Louis Cardinals	B
1964	4	44	Bob Long	Green Bay Packers	E
1964	5	67	Dick Klein	Cleveland Browns	T
1964	6	81	Henry Schichtle	New York Giants	QB
1964	7	89	Bill Parcells	Detroit Lions	T
1964	20	272	Steve Barilla	Detroit Lions	T
1965	15	205	Marvin Davis	Los Angeles Rams	E
1969	5	120	Earl Edwards	San Francisco 49ers	DT
1969	6	156	Jimmy Jones	New York Jets	LB
1969	16	406	Bob Hoskins	San Francisco 49ers	LB
1972	4	79	Randy Jackson	Buffalo Bills	RB
1972	15	373	Charles Harrington	Pittsburgh Steelers	G
1974	3	55	Rick Dvorak	New York Giants	DE
1974	13	322	Tom Owen	San Francisco 49ers	QB
1976	15	406	Steve Seminoff	New Orleans Saints	DT
1977	10	254	Sam Adkins	Seattle Seahawks	QB
1978	3	72	Ted Vincent	Cincinnati Bengals	DT
1978	9	238	Ron Shumon	Cincinnati Bengals	LB
1979	11	203	Charlie Moore	Pittsburgh Steelers	C
1984	2	42	Jumpy Geathers	New Orleans Saints	DE
1984	11	307	Anthony Jones	Washington Redskins	TE
