= Toneff =

Toneff is a surname. Notable people with the surname include:

- Bob Toneff (1930–2015), American football player
- Radka Toneff (1952–1982), Norwegian jazz singer
