= Nelson Toburen =

American football player (1938–2026)

No. 61
- Position: Linebacker

Personal information
- Born: November 24, 1938; Boulder, Colorado, U.S.
- Died: October 4, 2026 (aged 87); Pittsburg, Kansas, U.S.
- Listed height: 6 ft 3 in (1.91 m)
- Listed weight: 235 lb (107 kg)

Career information
- High school: Colby (Colby, Kansas)
- College: Wichita State
- NFL draft: 1961: 14th round, 194th overall pick

Career history
- Green Bay Packers (1961–1962)

Awards and highlights
- 2× NFL champion (1961, 1962)

Career NFL statistics
- Games played: 24
- Games started: 1
- Stats at Pro Football Reference

Nelson Edward Toburen (November 24, 1938 – October 4, 2026) was an American professional football player who was a linebacker for the Green Bay Packers of the National Football League (NFL). He played college football for the Wichita State Shockers. A serious neck injury in his second season ended his NFL career; Toburen attended law school and eventually became a judge.

== Early life ==
Born in Boulder, Colorado, Toburen played high school football in Kansas at Colby High School and college football for the Wichita State Shockers as an end.

== Playing career ==
Toburen was selected in the fourteenth round (194th overall) of the 1961 NFL draft by the Green Bay Packers. It was the team's third season under head coach Vince Lombardi and the Packers won the NFL championship, their first since 1944. As a rookie, Toburen was a reserve linebacker, playing mostly on special teams.

=== Only start ===
In 1962, Toburen was a second-year linebacker when he made his first NFL start, replacing the injured Dan Currie on November 18 at City Stadium in Green Bay. The Packers had won all nine games and the opponent was the Western Conference rival Baltimore Colts, led by star quarterback Johnny Unitas. The Packers were leading 17–13 early in the fourth quarter when, "Unitas went back to pass and then started to run," Toburen said. "(Ray) Nitschke was coming at him straight on and I was coming from the side.

"I hit him squarely in the hip, but the mechanics of the tackle got blown up. My head was down and it should have been up." Toburen's hit jarred the ball loose from Unitas and Nitschke recovered the fumble. But Toburen lay still on the City Stadium turf. "With my first start, my emotions were high, and I was playing reckless that day," Toburen said. "It was the greatest thing with my first start in front of my wife and dad. One moment I was on top of the world and then I wasn't."

Before Toburen even hit the ground, James Nellen, the team physician, was off the Packer bench and running onto the field to assist. "Doc Nellen realized right away what had happened - Nelson had broken his neck," said former guard Jerry Kramer. "According to Kramer, Nellen put pressure on Toburen's neck as they put him on a cart, moved him off the field, loaded him in the ambulance, wheeled him into the hospital and took him up to his room where they put him into traction.

Nellen's quick actions to stabilize Toburen's head and neck were instrumental to a successful outcome. "Nellen was wringing wet and shaking after that, but he made the difference," Kramer said. "He preserved Nelson's functions and maybe his life."

The 6 ft 3 in (1.91 m), 235-pound (107 kg) Toburen said it was a tackle that he had made more than 1,000 times in his football career, but he immediately knew something was wrong, very wrong. "I was aware of things and just knew that it felt like my arms were on fire," Toburen said. "Doc Nellen saved my bacon. He realized what was wrong and he didn't let me get up."

Toburen, whose sixth vertebrae broke in half and fifth was displaced, was fortunate that his spinal cord was stretched, not severed. At St. Vincent's Hospital, he was put in a body cast for the next six weeks. With Currie and Toburen out, backup center Ken Iman played linebacker and started the next game four days later on Thanksgiving in Detroit against the Lions (8–2).

"I tell people I broke my damn neck, but I had to be dramatic and do it against a hall of fame quarterback like Johnny Unitas," Toburen said with a laugh. "But I accomplished everything I set out to do on the play - make the tackle and cause a fumble. "Most important, we won the game. The next week we lost our only game at Detroit, and I always told my teammates it was because I wasn't there." But for Toburen, his first start in a Green Bay uniform also was his last.

== After football ==
Toburen obtained his law degree from Washburn University's School of Law in Topeka in 1967, and became a judge in Crawford County, Kansas, in 1987.

His son Chris was a standout linebacker at the University of Kansas and became a helicopter pilot in the U.S. Marine Corps. He was killed at age 27 in a training mission crash of his CH-46 in California in 1987.

Toburen died from pancreatic cancer in Pittsburg, Kansas, on October 4, 2026, at the age of 87.
