= Willie Wood =

American football player (1936–2020)

No. 24
- Position: Safety

Personal information
- Born: December 23, 1936; Washington, D.C., U.S.
- Died: February 3, 2020 (aged 83); Washington, D.C., U.S.
- Listed height: 5 ft 10 in (1.78 m)
- Listed weight: 190 lb (86 kg)

Career information
- High school: Armstrong (Washington, D.C.)
- College: USC
- NFL draft: 1960: undrafted

Career history

Playing
- Green Bay Packers (1960–1971)

Coaching
- San Diego Chargers (1971–1973) Defensive backs coach; Philadelphia Bell (1975) Head coach; Toronto Argonauts (1979) Defensive backs coach; Toronto Argonauts (1980–1981) Head coach

Awards and highlights
- 2× Super Bowl champion (1966, 1967); 5× NFL champion (1961, 1962, 1965, 1966, 1967); 5× First-team All-Pro (1964–1967, 1969); 4× Second-team All-Pro (1962, 1963, 1968, 1970); 8× Pro Bowl (1962, 1964–1970); NFL Interceptions leader (1962); NFL 1960s All-Decade Team; Green Bay Packers Hall of Fame

Career NFL statistics
- Interceptions: 48
- Interception yards: 699
- Defensive touchdowns: 2
- Stats at Pro Football Reference
- Pro Football Hall of Fame

William Vernell Wood Sr. (December 23, 1936 – February 3, 2020) was an American professional football player and coach. He played as a safety with the Green Bay Packers in the National Football League (NFL). Wood was an eight-time Pro Bowler and a nine-time All-Pro. In 1989, Wood was elected to the Pro Football Hall of Fame.

Wood played college football for the USC Trojans, becoming the first black quarterback to play in what is now the Pac-12 Conference. Undrafted out of USC, he was granted a try-out with Green Bay. Wood changed his position to safety in his rookie year and played for the Packers from 1960 to 1971, winning five NFL championships. He later coached in the NFL, World Football League (WFL), and Canadian Football League (CFL).

== College career ==
After graduating from Armstrong High School in Washington, D.C., in 1956, Wood went west and played college football in southern California, playing his freshman year at Coalinga Junior College, where he was a junior college All-American.

He transferred to the University of Southern California in Los Angeles in 1957 and played for the Trojans under first-year head coach Don Clark. While there he was the first African American quarterback in the history of the Pacific Coast Conference and its successor AAWU, now the Pac-12 Conference. Wood also played safety.

As a junior in 1958, he was sidelined with an injured shoulder, and as a senior in 1959, he separated his right shoulder and missed several games.

== Professional career ==
Wood was not selected in the 1960 NFL draft, and wrote a letter to head coach Vince Lombardi to request a tryout; the Packers signed him as a rookie free agent in 1960. After a few days with the quarterbacks, he requested a switch to defense and was recast as a free safety, and was a starter in the season. He started until his retirement in 1971.

Wood won All-NFL honors nine times in a nine-year stretch from 1962 through the 1971 season, participated in the Pro Bowl eight times, and played in six NFL championship games, winning all except the first in 1960.

He was ejected for bumping back judge Tom Kelleher while protesting a call during the third quarter of the 1962 NFL Championship Game vs. the New York Giants.

Wood was the starting free safety for the Packers in Super Bowl I against the Kansas City Chiefs and Super Bowl II against the Oakland Raiders. In Super Bowl I, he recorded a key interception that helped the Packers put the game away in the second half. In Super Bowl II, he returned five punts for 35 yards, including a 31-yard return that stood as the record for longest punt return in a Super Bowl until Darrell Green's 34-yard return in Super Bowl XVIII. He led the NFL in interceptions and punt return yards in 1962.

Wood finished his 12 NFL seasons with 48 interceptions, which he returned for 699 yards and two touchdowns. He also gained 1,391 yards and scored two touchdowns on 187 punt returns. He holds the record for the most consecutive starts by a safety in NFL history.

Wood retired as a player after the 1971 season; he was inducted into the Pro Football Hall of Fame in 1989, and the Packers Hall of Fame in 1977.

== Coaching career ==
After retiring as a player in January 1972, Wood became the defensive backs coach for the San Diego Chargers. In 1975, he was the defensive coordinator of the Philadelphia Bell of the WFL and became the first African-American head coach in professional football of the modern era in late July, days before the first game of the season. The Bell's season lasted only 11 games when the league folded in October.

Wood was later an assistant coach for the Toronto Argonauts in the CFL under Forrest Gregg, a Packer teammate. When Gregg left after the 1979 season for the Cincinnati Bengals in the NFL, Wood became the first black head coach in the CFL, but after an 0–10 start in 1981, he was fired.

== Personal life ==
His son, Willie Wood Jr., played for (1992–1993) and later coached the Indiana Firebirds in the Arena Football League, after coaching at Woodrow Wilson High School in Washington, D.C. Wood Jr. also served as the wide receiver/defensive backs coach and special teams coordinator for the Cleveland Gladiators of the Arena Football League.

Wood later lived in Washington, D.C., and underwent replacement knee surgery. In his later years, he had dementia. Wood died of natural causes on February 3, 2020, at an assisted living facility in Washington, D.C., at the age of 83. An autopsy conducted by a Boston University neuropathologist found that Wood had severe (stage 4) chronic traumatic encephalopathy (CTE), a degenerative brain disease linked to repeated hits to the head. He is one of at least 345 NFL players to be diagnosed after death with this disease.

In March 2012, a block of N Street NW in D.C. (38.9072°N 77.012°W) was named "Willie Wood Way."

== See also ==
- List of Pro Football Hall of Fame inductees
- List of NFL players with chronic traumatic encephalopathy
