= 1962 New York Giants season =

NFL team season

- Owner: Jack Mara; Wellington Mara
- Head coach: Allie Sherman
- Home stadium: Yankee Stadium

Results
- Record: 12–2
- Division place: 1st NFL Eastern
- Playoffs: Lost NFL Championship (vs. Packers) 7–16

The 1962 New York Giants season was the franchise's 38th season in the National Football League. Giants quarterback Y. A. Tittle had a breakout season in 1962. Said Cold Hard Football Facts, "It's safe to call Tittle a late bloomer. He enjoyed various degrees of success in his first 14 seasons with three teams in two different pro football leagues. But then in 1962, at the age of 36 and under second-year head coach Allie Sherman, Tittle exploded for a record 33 TD passes to lead the Giants to a 12–2 record."

Frank Gifford, back after a one season hiatus, and his first full year as a wide receiver (a position he would play for the rest of his career), has his best year as a wideout catching 39 passes for 796 yards and seven touchdowns.

== Offseason ==
=== Hall of Fame Game ===
- New York Giants 21, St. Louis Cardinals 21

== Regular season ==
=== Schedule ===
Game	Date	Opponent	Result	Record	Venue	Attendance	Recap	Sources
1	September 16	at **Cleveland Browns**	**L** 7–17	0–1	Cleveland Stadium	81,115	Recap	
2	September 23	at **Philadelphia Eagles**	**W** 29–13	1–1	Franklin Field	60,671	Recap	
3	September 30	at **Pittsburgh Steelers**	**W** 31–27	2–1	Pitt Stadium	40,916	Recap	
4	October 7	at **St. Louis Cardinals**	**W** 31–14	3–1	Busch Stadium	20,327	Recap	
5	October 14	**Pittsburgh Steelers**	**L** 17–20	3–2	Yankee Stadium	62,808	Recap	
6	October 21	Detroit Lions	**W** 17–14	4–2	Yankee Stadium	62,856	Recap	
7	October 28	**Washington Redskins**	**W** 49–34	5–2	Yankee Stadium	62,844	Recap	
8	November 4	**St. Louis Cardinals**	**W** 31–28	6–2	Yankee Stadium	62,775	Recap	
9	November 11	at **Dallas Cowboys**	**W** 41–10	7–2	Cotton Bowl	45,668	Recap	
10	November 18	**Philadelphia Eagles**	**W** 19–14	8–2	Yankee Stadium	62,705	Recap	
11	November 25	at **Washington Redskins**	**W** 42–24	9–2	D.C. Stadium	49,219	Recap	
12	December 2	at Chicago Bears	**W** 26–24	10–2	Wrigley Field	49,043	Recap	
13	December 9	**Cleveland Browns**	**W** 17–13	11–2	Yankee Stadium	62,794	Recap	
14	December 16	**Dallas Cowboys**	**W** 41–31	12–2	Yankee Stadium	62,694	Recap	
Note: Intra-division opponents are in **bold** text.

=== Standings ===
NFL Eastern Conference
	W	L	T	PCT	CONF	PF	PA	STK
New York Giants	12	2	0	.857	10–2	398	283	W9
Pittsburgh Steelers	9	5	0	.643	8–4	312	363	W3
Cleveland Browns	7	6	1	.538	6–5–1	291	257	W1
Washington Redskins	5	7	2	.417	4–6–2	305	376	L1
Dallas Cowboys	5	8	1	.385	4–7–1	398	402	L2
St. Louis Cardinals	4	9	1	.308	4–7–1	287	361	W2
Philadelphia Eagles	3	10	1	.231	3–8–1	282	356	L2

Note: Tie games were not officially counted in the standings until 1972.

NFL Western Conference
	W	L	T	PCT	CONF	PF	PA	STK
Green Bay Packers	13	1	0	.929	11–1	415	148	W3
Detroit Lions	11	3	0	.786	10–2	315	177	L1
Chicago Bears	9	5	0	.643	8–4	321	287	W2
Baltimore Colts	7	7	0	.500	5–7	293	288	W2
San Francisco 49ers	6	8	0	.429	5–7	282	331	L2
Minnesota Vikings	2	11	1	.154	1–10–1	254	410	L3
Los Angeles Rams	1	12	1	.077	1–10–1	220	334	L3

Note: Tie games were not officially counted in the standings until 1972.

== Playoffs ==
Round	Date	Opponent	Result	Venue	Attendance	Recap
Championship	December 30	Green Bay Packers	L 7–16	Yankee Stadium	64,892	Recap

Playoff Game Officials

Playoff
Round	Opponent	Referee	Umpire	Head Linesman	Back Judge	Field Judge
NFL Championship Game	Green Bay	(#9) Emil Heintz	(#57) Joseph Connell	(#30) George Murphy	(#25) Tom Kelleher	(#21) Fred Swearingen

=== Playoff game summaries ===
==== 1962 NFL Championship Game (Sunday, December 30, 1962): vs. Green Bay Packers ====
1962 NFL Championship Game: Green Bay Packers at New York Giants – Game summary

Quarter	1	2	3	4	Total
Packers	3	7	3	3	16
Giants	0	0	7	0	7

at Yankee Stadium • Bronx, New York

- Date: December 30
- Game time: 2:00 p.m. EST
- Game weather: 25 °F (−4 °C), relative humidity 58%, wind 27 mph (43 km/h), wind chill 8 °F (−13 °C)
- Game attendance: 64,892
- Referee: Emil Heintz
- TV announcers (NBC): Chris Schenkel and Ray Scott

Team	Category	Player	Statistics
GB	Passing		
GB	Rushing		
GB	Receiving		
NYG	Passing		
NYG	Rushing		
NYG	Receiving		

Scoring summary

Quarter	Time	Drive			Team	Scoring information	Score	
Quarter	Time	Plays	Yards	TOP	Team	Scoring information	GB	NYG
1					Packers	26-yard field goal by Kramer	3	0
2					Packers	Taylor 7-yard touchdown run, Kramer kick good	10	0
3		—	—	—	Giants	Collier recovered blocked punt in end zone, Chandler kick good	10	7
3					Packers	29-yard field goal by Kramer	13	7
4					Packers	30-yard field goal by Kramer	16	7
"TOP" = time of possession. For other American football terms, see Glossary of American football.							16	7

- Point spread: Giants +6½
- Time of game:

== Roster ==
1962 New York Giants roster
Quarterbacks (QB): 9 Ralph Guglielmi; 14 Y. A. Tittle; Running backs (RB): 46 Johnny Counts; 23 Paul Dudley; 24 Phil King; 40 Joe Morrison; 29 Alex Webster; Wide receivers (WR): 16 Frank Gifford; 85 Del Shofner; 88 Aaron Thomas; Tight ends (TE): 84 Jim Collier; 80 Joe Walton	Offensive linemen (OL): 63 Bookie Bolin G; 79 Rosey Brown T; 62 Darrell Dess G; 53 Greg Larson G; 66 Jack Stroud T/G; 65 Mickey Walker G; 55 Ray Wietecha C; Defensive linemen (DL): 60 Ken Byers DE; 76 Rosey Grier DT; 72 Charlie Janerette DT/T; 75 Jim Katcavage DE; 77 Dick Modzelewski DT; 81 Andy Robustelli DE	Linebackers (LB): 70 Sam Huff MLB; 30 Dick Lasse OLB; 82 Tom Scott OLB; 31 Bill Winter OLB; Defensive backs (DB): 49 Erich Barnes CB; 26 Sam Horner CB/S; 22 Dick Lynch CB; 20 Jimmy Patton FS; 25 Dick Pesonen CB/S; 21 Allan Webb SS; Special teams (ST): 34 Don Chandler K/P	Practice squad: -- Bob Bill T; 73 Reed Bohovich T; -- Jerry Hillebrand TE; -- Wilburn Hollis RB; -- Lou Kirouac K/TE; -- Bubba Marriott QB; -- Joe Taylor RB; Rookies in italics

=== Awards and honors ===
- Andy Robustelli, Bert Bell Award
- Del Shofner, Franchise Record, Most Receiving Yards in One Game, 269 Receiving Yards (October 28, 1962)
- Y. A. Tittle, NFL Record, Most Touchdown Passes in One Game, 7 Touchdown Passes (October 28, 1962)

== See also ==
- List of New York Giants seasons
