= 1962 San Francisco 49ers season =

American football team season

- Owner: Victor Morabito
- General manager: Louis Spadia
- Head coach: Howard Hickey
- Home stadium: Kezar Stadium

Results
- Record: 6–8
- Division place: 5th NFL Western
- Playoffs: Did not qualify

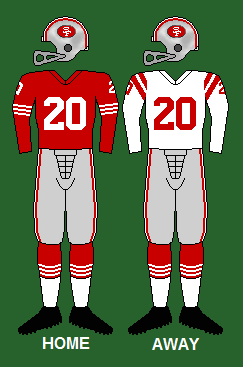

The 1962 San Francisco 49ers season was the franchise's 13th season in the National Football League, their 17th overall, and their 3rd season under head coach Red Hickey. This was the first season that the famous "S.F." oval logo appeared on the helmets.

The 49ers attempted to improve on their 7–6–1 record from the previous season, and make the playoffs for the first time in four seasons. Their offseason was notable, as they drafted Lance Alworth with their first round draft pick; however, he opted to go to the San Diego Chargers of the rival American Football League instead. The 49ers went 6–8 that season, finishing in 5th place in the NFL Western Conference, and failing to make the playoffs for the 5th straight year.

== Offseason ==
=== NFL draft ===
1962 San Francisco 49ers draft
Round	Pick	Player	Position	College	Notes
1	8	Lance Alworth * ^{†}	Wide receiver	Arkansas	signed with San Diego Chargers (AFL)
2	22	Ed Pine	Linebacker	Utah	
3	36	Billy Ray Adams	Fullback	Ole Miss	
4	46	Chuck Sieminski	Defensive tackle	Penn State	began play with 49ers in 1963.
4	50	Floyd Dean	Linebacker	Florida	began play with 49ers in 1964.
5	62	Ted Woods	Halfback	Colorado	signed with Calgary Stampeders (CFL)
5	64	Mike Lind	Fullback	Notre Dame	
6	71	Keith Luhnow	Back	Santa Ana JC	
6	76	Jerry Brown	Guard	Ole Miss	
6	78	Bill Winter	Tackle	West Virginia	
7	92	John Burrell	Wide receiver	Rice	
8	106	Jim Vollenweider	Halfback	Miami (FL)	
9	120	Jim Roberts	Tackle	Ole Miss	
10	134	Regis Coustillac	Guard	Pittsburgh	
11	148	Larry Jepson	Center	Furman	
12	162	Milton McPike	End	Northeast Missouri State	
13	176	George Pierovich	Back	California	
14	190	Dick Easterly	Back	Syracuse	signed with Hamilton Tiger-Cats (CFL)
15	204	Ray Osbourne	Tackle	Mississippi State	
16	218	Ron Frank	Tackle	South Dakota State	
17	232	Wally Foltz	End	DePauw	
18	246	Gary Brown	Tackle	Illinois	
19	260	Bob Burton	Tackle	Murray State	
20	274	Roger McFarland	Back	Kansas	
Made roster † Pro Football Hall of Fame * Made at least one Pro Bowl during career

== Personnel ==
=== Staff / Coaches ===
1962 San Francisco 49ers staff
Front office: Team Owner - Victor Morabito; General manager – Louis Spadia; Head coaches: Head coach - Red Hickey; Offensive coaches: Chief of Offense / Offensive Coordinator - Bill Johnson; Offensive Ends – Billy Wilson	Defensive coaches: Defensive Assistant – Dick Voris; Defensive Backfield / Secondary – Jim David; Special teams coaches: None - N/A

=== Roster ===
1962 San Francisco 49ers roster
Quarterbacks (QB): 12 John Brodie; 11 Bob Waters; Running backs (RB): 24 J. D. Smith; 17 Jim Vollenweider; 35 Bob Gaiters; Wide receivers (WR): 30 Bernie Casey; 88 Clyde Conner; 37 Jimmy Johnson; 26 Kay McFarland; 32 Lloyd Winston; Tight ends (TE): 85 Monty Stickles	Offensive linemen (OL): 77 Bruce Bosley C; 64 Ted Connolly G; 72 Leon Donohue G; 60 Roland Lakes T; 62 Mike Magac G; 76 Len Rohde T; 52 Karl Rubke C; 68 John Sutro T/G; 78 John Thomas T/MLB; Defensive linemen (DL): 86 Dan Colchico DE; 70 Charlie Krueger DT/DE; 75 John Mellekas DT; 74 Clark Miller DE; 73 Leo Nomellini DT	Linebackers (LB): 34 Bill Cooper OLB; 55 Matt Hazeltine OLB; 66 Carl Kammerer MLB; 54 Ed Pine OLB; Defensive backs (DB): 42 Eddie Dove FS; 45 Elbert Kimbrough SS; 80 Jerry Mertens CB; 29 Dale Messer FS/CB; 42 Jimmy Ridlon SS; 40 Abe Woodson CB; Special teams (ST): 36 Tommy Davis K/P	Reserve: -- Billy Ray Adams RB (IR); 17 Billy Kilmer (IR) RB/QB; 79 Bob St. Clair T (IR); Rookies in italics

== Preseason ==
Week	Date	Opponent	Result	Record	Venue
1	August 11	vs. Minnesota Vikings	W 30–24	1–0	Husky Stadium
2	August 19	New York Giants	W 42–10	2–0	Kezar Stadium
3	August 25	vs. Cleveland Browns	L 27–34	2–1	Multnomah Stadium
4	September 1	vs. Dallas Cowboys	W 26–7	3–1	Charles C. Hughes Stadium
5	September 8	at Los Angeles Rams	W 19–3	4–1	Los Angeles Memorial Coliseum

== Schedule ==
Week	Date	Opponent	Result	Record	Venue	Attendance
1	September 16	**Chicago Bears**	**L** 14–30	0–1	Kezar Stadium	46,052
2	September 23	at **Detroit Lions**	**L** 24–45	0–2	Tiger Stadium	51,032
3	September 30	**Minnesota Vikings**	**W** 21–7	1–2	Kezar Stadium	38,407
4	October 7	at **Baltimore Colts**	**W** 21–13	2–2	Memorial Stadium	54,148
5	October 14	at **Chicago Bears**	**W** 34–27	3–2	Wrigley Field	48,902
6	October 21	at **Green Bay Packers**	**L** 13–31	3–3	Milwaukee County Stadium	46,012
7	October 28	**Los Angeles Rams**	**L** 14–28	3–4	Kezar Stadium	51,033
8	November 4	**Baltimore Colts**	**L** 3–22	3–5	Kezar Stadium	44,875
9	November 11	**Detroit Lions**	**L** 24–38	3–6	Kezar Stadium	43,449
10	November 18	at **Los Angeles Rams**	**W** 24–17	4–6	Los Angeles Memorial Coliseum	42,554
11	November 25	at St. Louis Cardinals	**W** 24–17	5–6	Busch Stadium	17,532
12	December 2	at **Minnesota Vikings**	**W** 35–12	6–6	Metropolitan Stadium	33,076
13	December 9	**Green Bay Packers**	**L** 21–31	6–7	Kezar Stadium	53,769
14	December 15	Cleveland Browns	**L** 10–13	6–8	Kezar Stadium	35,274
Note: Intra-conference opponents are in **bold** text.

=== Season summary ===
==== Week 1 vs. Chicago Bears ====
Week One: Chicago Bears (0–0) at San Francisco 49ers (0–0)

Quarter	1	2	3	4	Total
Bears	10	7	7	6	**30**
49ers	0	0	7	7	**14**

at Kezar Stadium • San Francisco, California

- Date: September 16
- Game weather: 64 °F (18 °C) • Wind 13 miles per hour (21 km/h; 11 kn)
- Game attendance: 46,052
- Pro-Football-Reference.com

Game information

Bears

- Billy Wade
  5/13, 13 Yds
- Willie Galimore
  22 Rush, 181 Yds, 2 TD
  1 Rec, 7 Yds

49ers

- John Brodie
  12/22, 136 Yds, TD, 2 INT
- J.D. Smith
  7 Rush, 53 Yds
- Bernie Casey
  2 Rec, 51 Yds, TD

Scoring summary

Quarter	Time	Drive			Team	Scoring information	Score	
Quarter	Time	Plays	Yards	TOP	Team	Scoring information	CHI	SF
1					Bears	Interception returned 43 yards for touchdown by Rosey Taylor, Roger LeClerc kick good	7	0
1					Bears	17-yard field goal by Roger LeClerc	10	0
2					Bears	Rick Casares 16-yard touchdown run, Roger LeClerc kick good	17	0
3					49ers	John Brodie 6-yard touchdown run, Tommy Davis kick good	17	7
3					Bears	Willie Galimore 37-yard touchdown run, Roger LeClerc kick good	24	7
4					49ers	Bernie Casey 33-yard touchdown reception from John Brodie, Tommy Davis kick good	24	14
						Willie Galimore 77-yard touchdown run	30	14
"TOP" = time of possession. For other American football terms, see Glossary of American football.							30	14

== Standings ==
NFL Western Conference
	W	L	T	PCT	CONF	PF	PA	STK
Green Bay Packers	13	1	0	.929	11–1	415	148	W3
Detroit Lions	11	3	0	.786	10–2	315	177	L1
Chicago Bears	9	5	0	.643	8–4	321	287	W2
Baltimore Colts	7	7	0	.500	5–7	293	288	W2
San Francisco 49ers	6	8	0	.429	5–7	282	331	L2
Minnesota Vikings	2	11	1	.154	1–10–1	254	410	L3
Los Angeles Rams	1	12	1	.077	1–10–1	220	334	L3

Note: Tie games were not officially counted in the standings until 1972.
