= Don Mullins =

American football halfback and defensive back

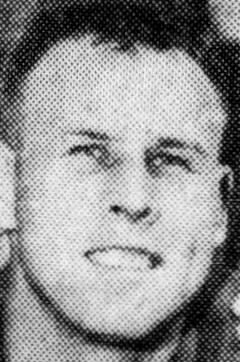
- Mullins in 1966

No. 40
- Positions: Halfback; Defensive back

Personal information
- Born: March 31, 1939; Shreveport, Louisiana, U.S.
- Died: August 5, 2020 (aged 81); Moore, Texas, U.S.

Career information
- High school: Fair Park
- College: Houston (1957–1960)

Career history
- Chicago Bears (1961–1962); Cleveland Browns (1963)*
- * Offseason or practice squad member only
- Stats at Pro Football Reference

Don Mullins (March 31, 1939 – August 5, 2020), nicknamed "Moon", was an American professional football halfback and defensive back. He played for the Chicago Bears and the Cleveland Browns of the National Football League (NFL).

== Life and career ==
Mullins was born in Shreveport, Louisiana, the son of Troy and Drucilla Mullins. He played high school football as a halfback at Fair Park High School in Shreveport, Louisiana. He then enrolled at the University of Houston to play college football for the Houston Cougars. He was on the freshman team in 1957, and was a three-year varsity letterman from 1958 to 1960.

In 1961, Mullins joined the Chicago Bears of the National Football League (NFL). He played in four games during the 1961 NFL season, and played in nine games during the 1962 NFL season, and in July 1963, he was traded to the Cleveland Browns, but was released from the team in August 1963. After his football career ended, he worked as a businessman in Houston, Texas.

== Death ==
Mullins died in Moore, Texas on August 25, 2020, at the age of 81.
