= Wiley Feagin =

American football player (1937–1990)

No. 61, 68
- Position: Guard

Personal information
- Born: August 28, 1937; Conroe, Texas, U.S.
- Died: August 20, 1990 (aged 52)

Career information
- College: Texas; Houston

Career history
- 1961–1962: Baltimore Colts
- 1963: Washington Redskins
- Stats at Pro Football Reference

Thomas Wiley Feagin (August 28, 1937 – August 20, 1990) was an American football guard in the National Football League for the Baltimore Colts and the Washington Redskins. He played college football at the University of Texas and the University of Houston.
