= Don Thompson (defensive end) =

American football player (born 1939)

No. 83
- Position: Defensive end

Personal information
- Born: October 7, 1939 (age 87); Danville, Virginia
- Listed height: 6 ft 4 in (1.93 m)
- Listed weight: 240 lb (109 kg)

Career information
- High school: Danville (VA)
- College: Ferrum JC, Richmond

Career history
- Baltimore Colts (1962–1963); Philadelphia Eagles (1964); Harrisburg Capitol Colts (ACFL, 1968)
- Stats at Pro Football Reference

Donald Wayne Thompson (born October 7, 1939) is an American former football defensive end who played professional football in the National Football League (NFL) for the Baltimore Colts (1962–1963) and the Philadelphia Eagles (1964)

== Early life ==
A native of Buchanan County, Virginia, he attended Brosvillle High School in Danville, Virginia. He played college football at Ferrum Junior College in 1958 and 1959 and for the University of Richmond in 1960 and 1961.

== Professional football ==
He was signed as a free agent by the Baltimore Colts in 1962 and was regarded as the team's "heir apparent to the great [Gino] Marchetti." He appeared in 10 games for the Colts in 1962, but his season ended in late November when he sustained a fractured elbow in a game against the Green Bay Packers. He returned from the injury in 1963, appearing in 14 games with the Colts.

In 1964, he joined the Philadelphia Eagles but appeared in only three games for the club.

Thompson also played in the Atlantic Coast Football League for the Harrisburg Capitol Colts during the 1968 season.
