= Jim Taylor (fullback) =

American football player (1935–2018)

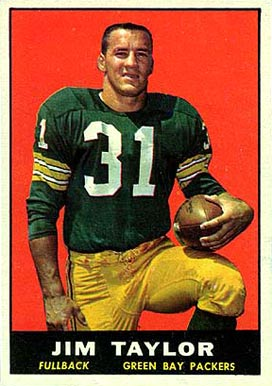
- Taylor on a 1961 trading card

No. 31
- Position: Fullback

Personal information
- Born: September 20, 1935; Baton Rouge, Louisiana, U.S.
- Died: October 13, 2018 (aged 83); Baton Rouge, Louisiana, U.S.
- Listed height: 6 ft 0 in (1.83 m)
- Listed weight: 214 lb (97 kg)

Career information
- High school: Baton Rouge High
- College: LSU (1954; 1956–1957)
- NFL draft: 1958: 2nd round, 15th overall pick

Career history
- Green Bay Packers (1958–1966); New Orleans Saints (1967)

Awards and highlights
- Super Bowl champion (I); 4× NFL champion (1961, 1962, 1965, 1966); NFL Most Valuable Player (1962); 3× First-team All-Pro (1960–1962); 3× Second-team All-Pro (1963, 1964, 1966); 5× Pro Bowl (1960–1964); NFL rushing yards leader (1962); 2× NFL rushing touchdowns leader (1961, 1962); NFL scoring leader (1962); NFL 1960s All-Decade Team; Green Bay Packers Hall of Fame; First-team All-American (1957); First-team All-SEC (1957)

Career NFL statistics
- Rushing yards: 8,597
- Rushing average: 4.4
- Rushing touchdowns: 83
- Receptions: 225
- Receiving yards: 1,756
- Receiving touchdowns: 10
- Stats at Pro Football Reference
- Pro Football Hall of Fame

James Charles Taylor (September 20, 1935 – October 13, 2018) was an American professional football player who was a fullback in the National Football League (NFL) for ten seasons, with the Green Bay Packers from 1958 to 1966 and with the expansion New Orleans Saints in 1967. With the Packers, Taylor was invited to five straight Pro Bowls and won four NFL championships, as well as a victory in the first Super Bowl. He was recognized as the NFL Most Valuable Player (MVP) after winning the rushing title in 1962, beating out Jim Brown. An aggressive player and fluent trash talker, Taylor developed several personal rivalries throughout his career, most notably with New York Giants linebacker Sam Huff. This confrontational attitude, combined with his tenacious running style, a penchant for contact, and ability to both withstand and deliver blows, earned him a reputation as one of the league's toughest players.

Playing college football for the LSU Tigers, Taylor led the Southeastern Conference (SEC) in scoring in 1956 and 1957 and earned first-team All-America honors as a senior. He was selected by the Packers in the second round of the 1958 NFL draft and was used sparingly as a rookie, but with the arrival of coach Vince Lombardi in 1959 Taylor soon became the team's all-purpose back, especially when only a few yards were needed. In this role, his spirited performance against the Giants in the 1962 NFL Championship Game came to define his mental and physical toughness.

Taylor finished his career after carrying 1,941 times for 8,597 yards and 83 touchdowns. He was the first player to record five straight seasons of at least 1,000 rushing yards. His 81 rushing touchdowns for the Packers remains a franchise record by a wide margin, and his 8,207 rushing yards with the team has been surpassed only once. Taylor was inducted into the Pro Football Hall of Fame in 1976. He is a member of the Green Bay Packers Hall of Fame and his number 31 jersey is retired by the Saints.

== Early life and college ==
Taylor was born in Baton Rouge, Louisiana, on September 20, 1935, He delivered morning and afternoon paper routes by bicycle for three dollars a week, helping his widowed mother make ends meet and developing his leg muscles. Though he did not play football until his junior year, he was a star athlete in four sports at Baton Rouge High School, and graduated in 1954. He stayed in town and played college football at Louisiana State University for coach Paul Dietzel's LSU Tigers football team. Taylor played on LSU's freshman team in 1954, but due to struggles in the classroom, he transferred to Hinds Community College in Raymond, Mississippi, as a sophomore, where he met his future wife Dixie Grant. He then returned to LSU as a junior.

Taylor rushed for 1,314 yards and scored 20 rushing touchdowns over his LSU career, and led the Southeastern Conference (SEC) in scoring in 1956 and 1957. "With the ball under his arm, Jimmy Taylor was the best running back I've ever coached," said Dietzel. "He was just so versatile." After spending the first half of his junior season learning the offense, Taylor scored 51 points in the team's final five games of 1956. As a senior in 1957, he shared the backfield with future Heisman Trophy winner Billy Cannon, a combination that accounted for over 1,500 yards from scrimmage and 17 touchdowns that season. Against Texas Tech, due to the Red Raiders' focus on containing Taylor, Cannon had one of the most productive games of his career. The following week, Taylor scored three touchdowns in LSU's 20–13 upset of a No. 17 Georgia Tech team whose focus was on stopping Cannon. In his final college game, Taylor carried 17 times for 171 yards and two touchdowns in a 35–6 victory over in-state rival Tulane. He was selected as a first-team All-American by the Football Writers Association of America, and earned first-team All-SEC honors from the Associated Press (AP) and United Press (UPI). After the season, he played in the Senior Bowl and was named the game's most valuable player.

== Professional career ==
=== Green Bay Packers ===
==== 1958–1962 ====
Taylor was selected by the Packers in the second round of the 1958 NFL draft, the 15th overall pick, taken in December 1957 while Lisle Blackbourn was still the head coach. His rookie contract was worth $9,500. That draft for the Packers included future stars Dan Currie (3rd), Ray Nitschke (36th), and Jerry Kramer (39th), but the 1958 team finished with the worst record in the league (and the franchise's worst ever, as of 2023), under first-year NFL head coach Ray "Scooter" McLean. Taylor was used sparingly as a rookie, but in the penultimate game at Kezar Stadium, he gained 137 yards on 22 carries in a 48–21 loss to the San Francisco 49ers, and his running style brought cheers from the San Francisco fans. With a one-year contract that was not to be renewed, McLean resigned days after the season and was replaced by Vince Lombardi in January 1959.

When Lombardi took over, Taylor became the feature back for the Packers, especially in short yardage situations. Taylor teamed with backfield mate, halfback Paul Hornung, to form a tandem that Green Bay fans affectionately called "Thunder and Lightning", due to Taylor's power and Hornung's agility. In 1960, Taylor rushed for 1,101 yards on a league-high 230 carries and scored 11 touchdowns. The Packers finished with an 8–4 record and met the Philadelphia Eagles in the 1960 NFL Championship Game. They were defeated 17–13, despite 24 carries for 105 yards and six catches for 46 yards from Taylor. Most notably, on the last play of the game, Taylor was tackled by Chuck Bednarik at the nine yard line. Following the season, Taylor was invited to his first Pro Bowl, where he tied a Pro Bowl record by scoring three touchdowns in the Western Conference's 35–31 victory over the East.

In the 1960s, Lombardi implemented the "Packers sweep" play in which guards Jerry Kramer and Fuzzy Thurston rapidly pulled out from their normal positions and led blocking for Hornung and Taylor. It became an integral part of the Packers' offense throughout the decade. In 1961, Taylor carried 243 times for 1,307 yards and led the league with 15 rushing touchdowns. For the second year in a row, his rushing yards total was second to Jim Brown of the Cleveland Browns. Taylor was selected as the second-team fullback behind Brown on the United Press International (UPI) All-Pro team, and finished second in voting behind Brown for the Associated Press (AP) team. The Packers again reached the NFL title game, this time defeating the New York Giants with a 37–0 shutout. Taylor had 69 yards on 14 attempts while playing despite badly damaged ribs, as Hornung carried most of the load for Green Bay.

Taylor's most productive season was 1962. With Hornung missing most of the season due to injury, Taylor picked up the slack. He set a league record by scoring 19 touchdowns and won the NFL rushing title with 1,474 yards, notable for being the only season in which Jim Brown did not lead the league during his nine-year career. He became the third player in NFL history to lead the league in both rushing yards and total points scored, following Steve Van Buren and Brown. He was named the "Player of the Year" by the AP, and was also awarded the Jim Thorpe Trophy by the Newspaper Enterprise Association (NEA) as the NFL's players' choice for league MVP. He earned first-team All-Pro honors from the AP, UPI, and NEA.

===== 1962 championship game =====
Taylor's performance in Green Bay's 16–7 win over the Giants in the 1962 NFL Championship Game came to define his mental and physical toughness. In frigid conditions at Yankee Stadium, Taylor carried 31 times for 85 yards and scored the Packers' only touchdown against what was considered the league's best defense, both statistically and by reputation. Lombardi entrusted Taylor with the ball, as he was confident his fullback would be able to move the offense and not turn it over. The game was highlighted by the fierce rivalry between Taylor and Giants linebacker Sam Huff. The two clashed on nearly every play and engaged in trash talk throughout the game. Steve Sabol, who filmed the game with his father for NFL Films, described it as such:

The lasting image of that game in my mind is the ferocity and anger of Jim Taylor ... his barely restrained rage as he ran with the ball. Taylor just got the shit kicked out of him all day long ... There was all this trash-talking between him and especially Sam Huff ... Tons of profanity when they tackled him. I had never experienced anything like that.

Taylor withstood a tremendous amount of punishment throughout the game. At one point in the first quarter, he bit his tongue while being tackled by Huff, causing him to swallow blood for the rest of the game. He also required six stitches at halftime to close a gash on his elbow. Some players wondered if he could even play in the second half. "Taylor isn't human," said Huff. "No human being could have taken the punishment he got today." Taylor described the contest in the locker room after the game, saying, "I never took a worse beating on a football field. The Giants hit me hard, and then I hit the ground hard. I got it both ways. This was the toughest game I've ever played ... I just rammed it down their throats by letting my running do my talking. They couldn't rattle me ... I think Huff hit me with his elbow after a tackle. Anyway, I cut my tongue of all things." Additionally, Taylor was playing while sick; two weeks later, he learned he had hepatitis, which contributed to his 15-pound weight loss prior to the game.

==== 1963–1966 ====
The animosity between Taylor and the Giants carried over into the 1963 preseason, as the second quarter of an exhibition game between Green Bay and New York began with Taylor drawing a personal foul penalty for roughing up Giants defensive end Andy Robustelli. Taylor had a slow start to the 1963 season as he recovered from numerous injuries and his bout of hepatitis, but still managed another 1,000-yard season. He again eclipsed 1,000 yards in 1964, becoming the first player to record five straight 1,000-yard rushing seasons. He also began to see more use as a receiver out of the backfield during his later career. His specialty in the passing game was catching short swing passes from quarterback Bart Starr. His most productive season as a receiver was 1964, as he caught 38 passes for a career-high 354 yards and three touchdowns. That season also included an 84-yard touchdown run in a win over the Detroit Lions, the longest run of his career and the longest of any player in the NFL that year. He made his final Pro Bowl appearance after the 1964 season and the last in a string of five straight. Despite the productivity from Taylor, the Packers missed the postseason in 1963 and 1964. They returned to the postseason in 1965, where Taylor carried 50 times for 156 yards over two games. He gained 96 of those yards during the Packers' 23–12 win over the Browns in the 1965 NFL Championship Game, second to Hornung's 105. Taylor was named the game's most outstanding player by SPORT magazine and received a Chevrolet Corvette.

During his ninth season in 1966, Taylor did not sign a new one-year contract and instead played out his option; he made no secret that it was likely his last season with the Packers. With the retirement of Jim Brown, he became the active leader in career rushing yards. He caught a career-high 41 passes that year but recorded the fewest rushing yards since his second season. The Packers finished atop the Western Division with a 12–2 record and defeated the Dallas Cowboys in the 1966 NFL Championship Game for their fourth NFL title in six years. In January 1967, Taylor and the Packers played in the first AFL–NFL World Championship Game, known retroactively as Super Bowl I, in Los Angeles Memorial Coliseum. They easily defeated the Kansas City Chiefs 35–10. Taylor was the top rusher of the game with 56 rushing yards and a touchdown on a Packer Sweep play, with his score being the first rushing touchdown in Super Bowl history. "It was just good blocking on a weak-side sweep play," said Taylor of his touchdown run. "It's a cakewalk when you get the blocking. It was just like we had been doing the last five or six years." The game was his final with the Packers.

=== New Orleans Saints ===
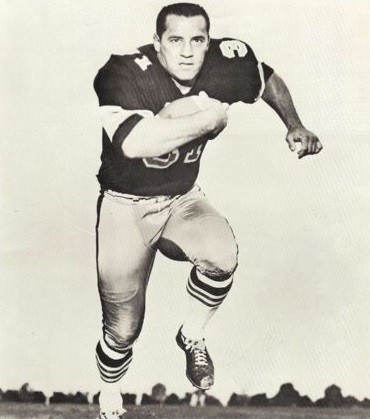
Taylor in 1967

In July 1967, Taylor left the Packers for the expansion New Orleans Saints to play under head coach Tom Fears, a Hall of Fame receiver and a former assistant coach for five seasons in Green Bay under Lombardi. He was signed to four one-year contracts with the Saints, worth $68,000 for 1968 and $72,000 for each subsequent season. The Saints also signed Hornung, though he retired prior to the 1967 season. Taylor recorded his lowest rushing statistics since his rookie season, but was still relatively productive as a receiver, catching 38 passes. Prior to the 1968 season, he was relegated to special teams duties, and as a result he refused to play in that week's exhibition game. Taylor retired from pro football in September 1968, at the end of training camp.

== NFL career statistics ==
Legend
	AP NFL MVP
	Won NFL championship
	Won the Super Bowl
	Led the league
**Bold**	Career high

=== Regular season ===
Year	Team	GP	Rushing						Receiving				
Year	Team	GP	Att	Yds	Avg	Lng	TD	Y/G	Rec	Yds	Avg	Lng	TD
1958	GB	12	52	247	4.8	25	1	20.6	4	72	18.0	31	1
1959	GB	9	120	452	3.8	21	6	50.2	9	71	7.9	20	2
1960	GB	12	230	1,101	4.8	32	11	91.8	15	121	8.1	27	0
1961	GB	14	243	1,307	5.4	53	15	93.4	25	175	7.0	18	1
1962	GB	14	**272**	**1,474**	5.4	51	**19**	**105.3**	22	106	4.8	25	0
1963	GB	13	248	1,018	4.1	40	9	78.3	13	68	5.2	27	1
1964	GB	13	235	1,169	5.0	**84**	12	89.9	38	354	9.3	35	3
1965	GB	14	207	734	3.5	35	4	52.4	20	207	10.4	41	0
1966	GB	14	204	705	3.5	19	4	50.4	41	331	8.1	21	2
1967	NO	14	130	390	3.0	16	2	27.9	38	251	6.6	27	0
Career		129	1,941	8,597	4.4	84	83	66.6	225	1,756	7.8	41	10

== Playing style ==
Although not exceptional in size at 6 ft 0 in (1.83 m), 215 lb (98 kg), Taylor was a physical fullback. He sought contact on every play, accordant with his philosophy: "Football is a contact sport. You've got to make them respect you. You've got to punish tacklers. You've got to deal out more misery than the tacklers deal out to you." He was widely acknowledged by his peers as one of the toughest and meanest players in the NFL. Former quarterback Bobby Layne listed him as one of "Pro Football's 11 Meanest Men" in an article for SPORT magazine in 1964. Packers linebacker Ray Nitschke said, "In 15 years with the pros, he's one of the toughest men I ever played against—and we were on the same team. He'd hurt you when you tackled him." He was difficult to tackle, as he fought for every extra yard. Giants linebacker Sam Huff proposed a rule change specifically in Taylor's case; per NFL rules, piling-on after a play invokes an unnecessary roughness penalty, but Huff argued, "You gotta pile on him a little to keep him down."

Despite the punishment his body took throughout his career, Taylor remained relatively injury-free compared to other power running backs. He remained in good health even in his later years, which he credited to his conditioning routine. He was often sighted at LSU baseball team practices, as well as at events involving all LSU teams.

=== Feud with Sam Huff ===
Taylor's high-profile verbal and physical clashes with Huff were well-noted. "He was always hooting his mouth off on the field," Huff said of Taylor. "He'd tell me, 'Yeah, you're just a big talker.' He brought the best out in you. He was an unusual player, a great player, but an agitator ... I did everything I could to that sonofabitch." The 1962 championship game between the Packers and Giants featured hard hitting and skirmishes throughout by both players, after which Taylor acknowledged there were "some hard feelings" between the two. Boxing promoter Al Flora, after watching the game on television, offered Taylor and Huff $2,000 for a four-round boxing match to be held in Baltimore on January 28, 1963. His offer was turned down, however.

=== Rivalry with Jim Brown ===
Taylor's career coincided with that of Jim Brown, who shattered several rushing records over the course of his nine-year career with the Cleveland Browns. The only season in which Brown did not win the rushing title was 1962, when he finished fourth in rushing yards as Taylor finished first. Taylor was a four-time runner-up to Brown for the rushing title (1960, 1961, 1963, 1964), and when he retired was the second-leading rusher in NFL history behind Brown. Because of this, and to his dismay, Taylor was often considered the league's second-best running back. He used this as motivation throughout his career. The Packers and Browns met three times in that span, all Green Bay victories, primarily due to Taylor's efforts. The last of those meetings was the 1965 NFL Championship Game, which turned out to be Brown's last game.

The first meeting between Taylor and Brown was a week-five game in 1961. In that 49–17 win at Cleveland on October 15, Taylor outmatched Brown's 16 carries for 72 yards as he rushed 21 times for 158 yards and four touchdowns. "I wouldn't say Taylor was better than Jim Brown, but he beat him head to head," said Packers historian Cliff Christl. "That's the type of player he was. It was a motivating factor for him."

== Death ==
Taylor died on October 13, 2018, at the age of 83, at a hospital, in Baton Rouge; no cause was given.

== Legacy and honors ==
Taylor finished his ten-year playing career with 8,597 yards and 83 rushing touchdowns, highlighted by his five straight 1,000-yard rushing seasons from 1960 to 1964. He was the first running back in NFL history to rush for over 1,000 yards for five consecutive seasons. Taylor also caught 225 passes for 1,756 yards and 10 touchdowns, and returned seven kickoffs for 185 yards, giving him a total of 10,539 net yards and 93 touchdowns. He holds many Packers records, including both career and single-season touchdowns. His 8,207 rushing yards with the Packers remained a franchise record until Ahman Green surpassed it on November 8, 2009. His single-season yardage mark of 1,474 in 1962 was not surpassed by a Packer until Green ran for 1,883 yards in 2003—a 16-game season, as opposed to the 14-game 1962 season. At retirement, Taylor's 83 career rushing touchdowns placed him behind only Brown.

During John W. Mecom Jr.'s ownership of the Saints, the number 31 was retired for Taylor. However, the number was unretired in 2001.

Taylor was inducted into the Green Bay Packers Hall of Fame in 1975. The following year, he was elected to the Pro Football Hall of Fame. He was the first Packers player from the Lombardi era to be inducted. Marie Lombardi, Vince's widow, was chosen as Taylor's presenter. In 2014, The Times-Picayune ranked Taylor 23rd on its list of Louisiana's all-time greatest athletes. He was elected to the Louisiana Sports Hall of Fame in 1974, the National High School Hall of Fame in 1988, and the Wisconsin Athletic Hall of Fame in 2001. The Pro Football Hall of Fame selection committee named Taylor to its NFL 1960s All-Decade Team, which comprised the best players of the 1960s at each position.

Taylor became a successful businessman after his football career. He was commissioner of the United States Rugby League in 1978 and attempted to start a 12-team competition. He also maintained his physical condition well after his playing days; he participated in the Superstars competition in 1977 and finished fourth in 1979. In 1982, Taylor did play-by-play with Paul Hornung for TigerVision, LSU's pay-per-view broadcasts. In 2000, aged 65, he was jogging five to six miles daily to stay in shape. Taylor was diagnosed with hepatitis C in 1989, but it was found to be dormant by 2000. The Tigers honored Taylor with a moment of silence before their 36–16 victory over Georgia at Tiger Stadium.
