= Gary Fallon =

American gridiron football player and coach (1939–1995)

Biographical details
- Born: April 3, 1939; Watertown, New York, U.S.
- Died: April 29, 1995 (aged 56); Lexington, Virginia, U.S.

Playing career
- 1958–1961: Syracuse
- 1962: Frankfort Falcons
- 1962: Hamilton Tiger-Cats
- 1963: Syracuse Stormers
- 1964–1965: Mohawk Valley Falcons
- 1966: Scranton Miners
- Positions: Fullback, halfback, placekicker, punter, linebacker

Coaching career (HC unless noted)
- 1970–1971: Ithaca (assistant)
- 1972–1977: Princeton (assistant)
- 1978–1994: Washington and Lee

Head coaching record
- Overall: 77–84–1

Accomplishments and honors

Championships
- 2 ODAC (1981, 1985)

Awards
- 3× ODAC Coach of the Year (1981, 1988, 1992)

Gary R. Fallon (April 3, 1939 – April 29, 1995) was an American gridiron football player and coach. He played college football at Syracuse University and spent a year playing for the Hamilton Tiger-Cats of the Canadian Football League (CFL). American served as the head football coach at Washington and Lee University in Lexington, Virginia from 1978 to 1994, compiling a record of 77–84–1.

Fallon was still Washington & Lee's coach when he died suddenly from a heart attack at the age of 56.

== Head coaching record ==
Year	Team	Overall	Conference	Standing	Bowl/playoffs
Washington and Lee Generals (Old Dominion Athletic Conference) (1978–1994)
1978	Washington and Lee	2–8	1–3	T–4th	
1979	Washington and Lee	4–6	1–3	T–4th	
1980	Washington and Lee	6–4	2–3	T–4th	
1981	Washington and Lee	8–2	4–1	1st	
1982	Washington and Lee	5–4	3–2	T–2nd	
1983	Washington and Lee	6–3	4–2	T–2nd	
1984	Washington and Lee	6–4	2–3	4th	
1985	Washington and Lee	7–2	4–1	T–1st	
1986	Washington and Lee	2–7	1–4	T–4th	
1987	Washington and Lee	3–6	1–4	T–4th	
1988	Washington and Lee	5–3–1	1–2–1	T–3rd	
1989	Washington and Lee	5–5	1–3	T–4th	
1990	Washington and Lee	5–5	1–3	T–4th	
1991	Washington and Lee	1–9	0–5	6th	
1992	Washington and Lee	5–4	2–3	T–3rd	
1993	Washington and Lee	2–8	1–4	T–4th	
1994	Washington and Lee	5–4	2–3	5th	
Washington and Lee:		77–84–1	31–49–1		
Total:		77–84–1			
National championship Conference title Conference division title or championship game berth
