= Bobby Mitchell =

American football player and executive (1935–2020)

- Mitchell with the Cleveland Browns in 1959

No. 49
- Positions: Halfback, wide receiver

Personal information
- Born: June 6, 1935; Hot Springs, Arkansas, U.S.
- Died: April 5, 2020 (aged 84)
- Listed height: 6 ft 0 in (1.83 m)
- Listed weight: 192 lb (87 kg)

Career information
- High school: Langston (Hot Springs)
- College: Illinois (1954–1957)
- NFL draft: 1958: 7th round, 84th overall pick

Career history

Playing
- Cleveland Browns (1958–1961); Washington Redskins (1962–1968)

Operations
- Washington Redskins (1969–1972) Scout; Washington Redskins (1973–1977) Director of pro scouting; Washington Redskins (1978–1980) Executive assistant to the president; Washington Redskins (1981–2002) Assistant general manager

Awards and highlights
- As a player: 3× First-team All-Pro (1962–1964); 2× Second-team All-Pro (1959, 1960); 4× Pro Bowl (1960, 1962–1964); NFL receptions leader (1962); 2× NFL receiving yards leader (1962, 1963); NFL receiving touchdowns co-leader (1964); Washington Commanders No. 49 retired; Washington Commanders 90 Greatest; Washington Commanders Ring of Fame; Cleveland Browns Ring of Honor; First-team All-Big Ten (1955); Second-team All-Big Ten (1957); As an executive: 3× Super Bowl champion (XVII, XXII, XXVI); NFL records: Longest receiving touchdown: 99 yards (tied)

Career NFL statistics
- Receptions: 521
- Receiving yards: 7,954
- Rushing yards: 2,753
- Rushing average: 5.3
- Return yards: 3,380
- Total touchdowns: 91
- Stats at Pro Football Reference
- Pro Football Hall of Fame

Robert Cornelius Mitchell (June 6, 1935 – April 5, 2020) was an American professional football player who was a halfback and wide receiver in the National Football League (NFL). He played college football for the Illinois Fighting Illini and professionally for the Cleveland Browns and Washington Redskins. In 1962 he was the first black player to sign with the Redskins, who were the last NFL team to racially integrate.

After his playing career, Mitchell became an executive with Washington. He joined their scouting department in 1969 and was named assistant general manager in 1981, spending over 40 years with the team in total before retiring in 2002. He was inducted into the Pro Football Hall of Fame in 1983 and had his jersey number 49 retired by the team following his death in 2020.

== Early life ==
Mitchell was born in Hot Springs, Arkansas, and attended Langston High School. There, he played football, basketball, and track, and was good enough at baseball to be offered a contract with the St. Louis Cardinals.

== College career ==
Instead of playing professional baseball, Mitchell chose to attend the University of Illinois at Urbana-Champaign, which he picked from a host of schools that offered him scholarships. He played college football for the Illinois Fighting Illini and had a particularly good sophomore year. At the beginning of the 1955 season, he was behind junior Harry Jefferson on the depth chart. Seven games into the season, Jefferson went down with an injury, and Mitchell took over at one of the halfback spots. The first time he handled the football, he ran 64 yards for a touchdown. Though he entered in the third quarter, Mitchell gained 173 yards in 10 carries, and the Illini upset third-ranked Michigan, 25–6. He gained more than 100 yards in each of the final two games of the season, when he also played as a defensive back. That year, he averaged a record 8.6 yards per rush.

As a junior in 1956, Mitchell did not see the field much due to a knee injury. After his senior season, he was invited to play in the College All-Star Game, where he got behind defensive back, James David on an 84-yard touchdown reception, and then scored again on an 18-yard pass from Jim Ninowski. The All-Stars' upset the Detroit Lions, 35–19, and Mitchell and Ninowski shared game MVP honors. Mitchell was named first-team All-Big Ten football in 1955 and second-team status in 1957. He was named to The Pigskin Club Honor Roll by The Pigskin Club of Washington, D.C.

Mitchell was even more successful in track. In February 1958, he set an indoor world record (one that lasted only six days) with a 7.7 mark in the 70-yard low hurdles. He was the runner-up in the long jump at the 1958 NCAA Track and Field Championships. In the Big Ten championships, he scored 13 points and helped Illinois win the title. Mitchell was unsure whether he wanted to pursue a career in football or track. Even though the 1960 Summer Olympics were still two years away, he had his sights set on competing on the American team. However, Cleveland Browns head coach Paul Brown offered to pay him $7,000 during his rookie season and was able to convince Mitchell to play football instead of participating in the Olympics.

== NFL playing career ==
=== Cleveland Browns (1958–1961) ===
Mitchell was drafted 84th overall in the seventh round of the 1958 NFL draft by the Cleveland Browns, where he played as a halfback. He was teamed with Jim Brown to give the Browns one of the most successful running back combinations from 1958 through 1961.

As a rookie, Mitchell had a 98-yard kickoff return. A year later against Washington, he rushed for 232 yards, including a 90-yard scoring scamper, a Browns record until it was broken by Nick Chubb in 2018. The same year, he returned a punt 78 yards against the New York Giants. He earned his first Pro Bowl selection in 1960.

As a Brown, Mitchell accumulated 2297 yards rushing, 1463 yards receiving, 607 yards on punt returns, 1550 yards on kickoff returns, and scored 38 touchdowns. He once held the Browns' career record for kickoff returns for touchdowns, and he also currently holds the team's best rookie rushing average (6.3 in 1958).

=== Washington Redskins (1962–1968) ===
Under pressure to integrate the team by the U.S. federal government, the Washington Redskins selected Heisman Trophy winner Ernie Davis with the first overall pick of the 1962 NFL draft. However, Redskins owner George Preston Marshall, wary of Davis's potential salary demands, traded his rights to the Cleveland Browns for Mitchell and first-round draft pick Leroy Jackson. Unbeknownst to anyone at the time of the draft, Davis had leukemia, and died without ever playing a down in professional football.

Mitchell, along with John Nisby, Leroy Jackson, and Ron Hatcher, was one of four black players on the 1962 Redskins, as the franchise became the last professional football team to integrate. Bill McPeak, in his first year as head coach, immediately announced Mitchell would become a flanker. In his first game in Washington, Mitchell ran back a 92-yard kickoff return against the Dallas Cowboys. The Redskins finished the season with a 5–7–2 record, their best record in five years. Mitchell led the league with 72 catches and 1384 yards and ranked third with 11 touchdowns. He was selected to the first of three consecutive Pro Bowls.

In 1963, Mitchell recorded 69 catches for 1436 yards and seven more touchdowns. During this season, he also became the second player in league and franchise history to record a 99-yard pass play. The pass from George Izo was the first 99-yard pass in over 23 years, when the Redskins' Frank Filchock and Andy Farkas set the original record October 15, 1939. During the next four years, Mitchell's reception totals were 60, 60, 58 and 60. In 1967, new head coach Otto Graham chose to move Mitchell back to halfback because of Graham's decision a year earlier to move the team's best running back, Charley Taylor, to wide receiver. Mitchell enjoyed only moderate success running the ball but he did catch 60 passes for 866 yards and six touchdowns.

In 1969, Vince Lombardi became head coach and promised Mitchell that he would return him to flanker. But as training camp progressed, Mitchell realized that he was not in the same shape he once was and chose to retire.

During his first six seasons with the Redskins, Mitchell never caught fewer than 58 passes. When he retired, his 14,078 combined net yards was the second-highest total in NFL history. He had also scored 91 touchdowns (18 by rushing, 65 on receptions, 3 on punt returns, and 5 on kickoff returns). He amassed 7,954 yards on receptions and 2,735 yards on rushes. He was elected to the Pro Football Hall of Fame in 1983.

Thomas Boswell of the Washington Post wrote an appreciation of Mitchell after his death: "As a four-way threat — running the ball from the backfield, catching passes as a wide receiver and returning kickoffs and punts — Mitchell is unique. No player has been among the very best in all four areas. Mitchell is a group photo of one ... Who is the only NFL player with more than 500 career rushes and 500 receptions to average more than five yards per carry (5.3) and more than 15 yards per catch (15.3)? Bobby Mitchell."

On June 20, 2020, the Washington Redskins announced that they would retire his number, #49. He was just the second member of the team to have his number retired, alongside Sammy Baugh's #33.

== NFL career statistics ==
Legend
	Led the league
**Bold**	Career high

=== Regular season ===
Year	Team	Games		Receiving					Rushing					Returning				
Year	Team	GP	GS	Rec	Yds	Avg	Lng	TD	Att	Yds	Avg	Lng	TD	Ret	Yds	Avg	Lng	TD
1958	CLE	12	7	16	131	8.2	25	3	80	500	6.3	63	1	**32**	**619**	19.3	**98**	**2**
1959	CLE	12	12	35	351	10.0	76	4	**131**	**743**	5.7	**90**	**5**	28	413	14.8	78	1
1960	CLE	12	11	45	612	13.6	69	6	111	506	4.6	50	**5**	26	533	20.5	90	1
1961	CLE	**14**	13	32	368	11.5	52	3	101	548	5.4	56	**5**	30	592	19.7	91	**2**
1962	WAS	**14**	**14**	**72**	1,384	19.2	81	**11**	1	5	5.0	5	0	15	405	**27.0**	92	1
1963	WAS	**14**	**14**	69	**1,436**	**20.8**	**99**	7	3	24	8.0	21	0	15	392	26.1	92	1
1964	WAS	**14**	**14**	60	904	15.1	60	10	2	33	**16.5**	19	0	3	58	19.3	28	0
1965	WAS	**14**	12	60	867	14.5	80	6	–	–	–	–	–	6	131	21.8	35	0
1966	WAS	**14**	13	58	905	15.6	70	9	13	141	10.8	48	1	4	21	5.3	13	0
1967	WAS	**14**	**14**	60	866	14.4	65	6	61	189	3.1	16	1	–	–	–	–	–
1968	WAS	**14**	4	14	130	9.3	18	0	10	46	4.6	13	0	12	235	19.6	43	0
Career		148	128	521	7,954	15.3	99T	65	513	2,735	5.3	90	18	171	3,389	19.8	98	8

== Front-office career (1969–2003) ==
After retiring from football in 1968, Mitchell remained with the Redskins, at the request of then head coach Vince Lombardi, as a pro scout. He gradually moved up in the ranks to assistant general manager in the organization, and he aspired to become the NFL's first black GM. In 1978, Washington owner Edward Bennett Williams passed over Mitchell for the GM position in favor of Bobby Beathard. Mitchell retired in 2003, stating that he was "deeply hurt" by how owner Jack Kent Cooke passed him over as the team's general manager in favor of Charley Casserly in 1989 and by coach Steve Spurrier's decision to issue his No. 49 uniform number, which had not been issued for years though never retired, to Leonard Stephens that season.

As a player and a front office executive, Mitchell spent 41 years with the Redskins.

== Personal life ==
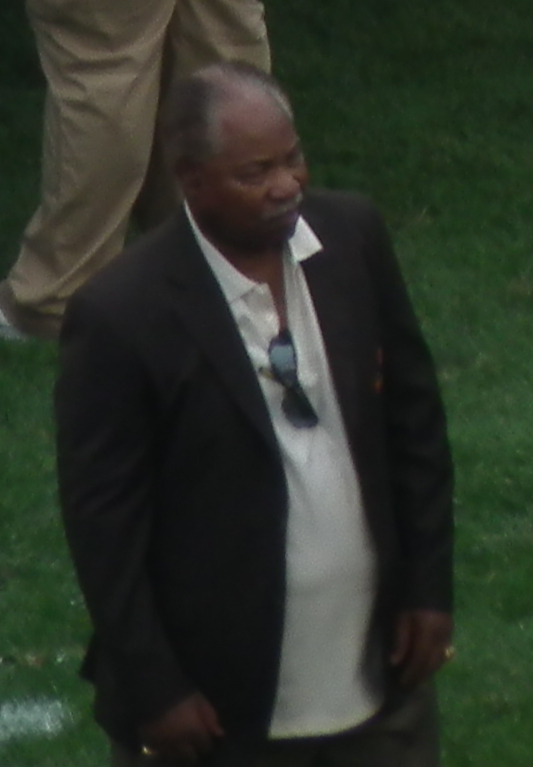
Mitchell in 2010

Mitchell lived in Washington, D.C., with his wife, Gwen, an attorney. They had two children, Robert Jr. and Terri.

Beginning in 1990, Mitchell hosted the Bobby Mitchell Hall of Fame Classic, an annual golf fundraiser that benefits the Leukemia & Lymphoma Society.

Mitchell also worked in many efforts and organizations, including the United Negro College Fund, the Howard University Cancer Research Advisory Committee, the American Lung Association of D.C., the Martin Luther King Jr. Holiday Commission, the Boys Club of Washington, the National Urban League, the NAACP, the Junior Chamber of Commerce, the University of Illinois Presidents Council and the University of Illinois Foundation.

Mitchell died at age 84 on April 5, 2020.
