= Galen Fiss =

American football player (1931–2006)

No. 35
- Position: Linebacker

Personal information
- Born: July 30, 1931; Johnson City, Kansas, U.S.
- Died: July 17, 2006 (aged 74); Overland Park, Kansas, U.S.
- Listed height: 6 ft 0 in (1.83 m)
- Listed weight: 227 lb (103 kg)

Career information
- College: Kansas
- NFL draft: 1953: 13th round, 155th overall pick

Career history
- Cleveland Browns (1960–1972)

Awards and highlights
- NFL champion (1964); Second-team All-Pro (1962); 2× Pro Bowl (1962, 1963); Cleveland Browns legends (2013); First-team All-Big Seven (1952)

Career NFL statistics
- Interceptions: 13
- Interception yards: 178
- Fumble recoveries: 18
- Stats at Pro Football Reference

Galen Fiss (July 30, 1931 – July 17, 2006) was an American professional football player who was a linebacker who played 11 seasons with the Cleveland Browns of the National Football League (NFL). He played college football for the Kansas Jayhawks. He was captain on Cleveland's NFL championship team in 1964. Fiss, who had Alzheimer's disease, died of cardiac arrest in 2006.

Fiss was inducted into the Kansas Sports Hall of Fame in 2017.
