= 1962 Chicago Bears season =

NFL team season

- Head coach: George Halas
- Home stadium: Wrigley Field

Results
- Record: 9–5
- Division place: 3rd Western
- Playoffs: Did not qualify

The 1962 Chicago Bears season was their 43rd regular season completed in the National Football League. The team finished with a 9–5 record, earning them a third-place finish in the NFL Western Conference. This was the first season that the wishbone "C" appeared on the helmets (albeit in white; it would not adopt its more familiar burnt orange color until 1974).

== Roster ==
1962 Chicago Bears roster
Quarterbacks (QB): 14 Rudy Bukich; 9 Billy Wade; Running backs (RB): 49 Charlie Bivins; 29 Ronnie Bull; 35 Rick Casares; 34 Joe Marconi; 22 Billy Martin; Wide receivers (WR): 46 Angelo Coia; 84 Bo Farrington; 47 Johnny Morris; Tight ends (TE): 39 John Adams; 89 Mike Ditka	Offensive linemen (OL): 72 Jim Cadile T; 67 Ted Karras G; 70 Herman Lee T; 50 Mike Pyle C; 63 Bob Wetoska T; 79 Art Anderson T; 73 Stan Jones G; Defensive linemen (DL): 81 Doug Atkins DE; 65 Stan Fanning DT; 74 Bob Kilcullen DT/DE; 71 Earl Leggett DT; 87 Ed O'Bradovich DE; 75 Fred Williams DT	Linebackers (LB): 31 Joe Fortunato OLB; 61 Bill George MLB; 83 Roger LeClerc MLB/K; 33 Larry Morris OLB; Defensive backs (DB): 25 J. C. Caroline CB; 26 Bennie McRae CB; 48 Tommy Neck SS; 17 Richie Petitbon SS; 24 Rosey Taylor FS; 23 Dave Whitsell CB; Special teams (ST): 88 Bobby Joe Green P	Practice squad: 28 Willie Galimore RB (IR); 40 Don Mullins S (IR); 82 Maury Youmans DE (IR); Reserve: 60 Roger Davis G (IR); 28 Willie Galimore RB (IR); 40 Don Mullins S (IR); 82 Maury Youmans DE (IR); 60 Roger Davis G (IR); Rookies in italics

== Schedule ==
Week	Date	Opponent	Score	Record	Venue	Attendance
1	September 16	at **San Francisco 49ers**	**W** 30–14	1–0	Kezar Stadium	46,052
2	September 23	at **Los Angeles Rams**	**W** 27–23	2–0	Los Angeles Memorial Coliseum	44,376
3	September 30	at **Green Bay Packers**	**L** 0–49	2–1	City Stadium	38,689
4	October 7	at **Minnesota Vikings**	**W** 13–0	3–1	Metropolitan Stadium	33,141
5	October 14	**San Francisco 49ers**	**L** 27–34	3–2	Wrigley Field	48,902
6	October 21	**Baltimore Colts**	**W** 35–15	4–2	Wrigley Field	49,066
7	October 28	at **Detroit Lions**	**L** 3–11	4–3	Tiger Stadium	53,342
8	November 4	**Green Bay Packers**	**L** 7–38	4–4	Wrigley Field	48,753
9	November 11	**Minnesota Vikings**	**W** 31–30	5–4	Wrigley Field	46,984
10	November 18	at Dallas Cowboys	**W** 34–33	6–4	Cotton Bowl	12,692
11	November 25	at **Baltimore Colts**	**W** 57–0	7–4	Memorial Stadium	56,164
12	December 2	New York Giants	**L** 24–26	7–5	Wrigley Field	49,043
13	December 9	**Los Angeles Rams**	**W** 30–14	8–5	Wrigley Field	38,685
14	December 16	**Detroit Lions**	**W** 3–0	9–5	Wrigley Field	44,948
Note: Intra-conference opponents are in **bold** text.

== Season summary ==
=== Week 1 at 49ers ===
Week One: Chicago Bears (0–0) at San Francisco 49ers (0–0)

Quarter	1	2	3	4	Total
Bears	10	7	7	6	30
49ers	0	0	7	7	14

at Kezar Stadium • San Francisco, California

- Date: September 16
- Game weather: 64 °F (18 °C) • Wind 13 miles per hour (21 km/h; 11 kn)
- Game attendance: 46,052
- Pro-Football-Reference.com

Game information

Bears

- Billy Wade
  5/13, 13 Yds
- Willie Galimore
  22 Rush, 181 Yds, 2 TD
  1 Rec, 7 Yds

49ers

- John Brodie
  12/22, 136 Yds, TD, 2 INT
- J.D. Smith
  7 Rush, 53 Yds
- Bernie Casey
  2 Rec, 51 Yds, TD

Scoring summary

Quarter	Time	Drive			Team	Scoring information	Score	
Quarter	Time	Plays	Yards	TOP	Team	Scoring information	CHI	SF
1					Bears	Interception returned 43 yards for touchdown by Rosey Taylor, Roger LeClerc kick good	7	0
1					Bears	17-yard field goal by Roger LeClerc	10	0
2					Bears	Rick Casares 16-yard touchdown run, Roger LeClerc kick good	17	0
3					49ers	John Brodie 6-yard touchdown run, Tommy Davis kick good	17	7
3					Bears	Willie Galimore 37-yard touchdown run, Roger LeClerc kick good	24	7
4					49ers	Bernie Casey 33-yard touchdown reception from John Brodie, Tommy Davis kick good	24	14
						Willie Galimore 77-yard touchdown run	30	14
"TOP" = time of possession. For other American football terms, see Glossary of American football.							30	14

== Standings ==
NFL Western Conference
	W	L	T	PCT	CONF	PF	PA	STK
Green Bay Packers	13	1	0	.929	11–1	415	148	W3
Detroit Lions	11	3	0	.786	10–2	315	177	L1
Chicago Bears	9	5	0	.643	8–4	321	287	W2
Baltimore Colts	7	7	0	.500	5–7	293	288	W2
San Francisco 49ers	6	8	0	.429	5–7	282	331	L2
Minnesota Vikings	2	11	1	.154	1–10–1	254	410	L3
Los Angeles Rams	1	12	1	.077	1–10–1	220	334	L3

Note: Tie games were not officially counted in the standings until 1972.
