= 1962 Green Bay Packers season =

NFL team season (8th championship)

- General manager: Vince Lombardi
- Head coach: Vince Lombardi
- Home stadium: City Stadium; Milwaukee County Stadium

Results
- Record: 13–1
- Division place: 1st NFL Western
- Playoffs: Won NFL Championship (at Giants) 16–7

The 1962 Green Bay Packers season was their 44th season overall and their 42nd season in the National Football League. The team finished with a 13–1 record under coach Vince Lombardi, earning them a first-place finish in the Western Conference. The Packers ended the season by defeating the New York Giants 16–7 in the NFL Championship Game, the Packers second consecutive defeat of the Giants in the championship game. This marked the Packers' eighth NFL World Championship.

In 2007, ESPN.com ranked the 1962 Packers as the fifth-greatest defense in NFL history, noting, "The great 1962 Packers had a rock-solid defense front to back, with five Hall of Famers: defensive linemen Willie Davis and Henry Jordan, linebacker Ray Nitschke, cornerback Herb Adderley, and safety Willie Wood. (They also had 1962 All-Pro linebackers Dan Currie and Bill Forester.) Green Bay gave up just 10.8 points per game, shutting out opponents three times. The Packers held opposing QBs to a 43.5 rating, due, in part, to Wood's league-leading nine interceptions. The Packers' defense allowed the Giants 291 yards in the NFL championship game, but held the Giants offense scoreless as the Packers won, 16–7 (New York scored on a blocked punt)."

The Packers' +267 point differential (points scored vs. points against) in 1962 is the best total of any NFL team in the 1960s. Cold Hard Football Facts says that the 1962 Packers "may have been the best rushing team in the history of football. And that team etched in historic stone the image of Lombardi's three-yards-and-a-cloud-of-dust Packers that is still so powerful today."

The 1962 Packers ranked #9 on the 100 greatest teams of all time presented by the NFL on its 100th anniversary, the highest ranking of any Packers team. Other Green Bay teams coached by Vince Lombardi of the 100 greatest were in 1966 at #13 and 1967 at #56.

== Offseason ==
=== NFL draft ===
Round	Pick	Player	Position	School
1	14	Earl Gros	Running back	LSU
2	28	Ed Blaine	Guard	Missouri
3	41	Gary Barnes	Wide receiver	Clemson
4	56	Ron Gassert	Defensive tackle	Virginia
5	65	Chuck Morris	Back	Ole Miss
5	70	Jon Schopf	Guard	Michigan
6	79	John Sutro	Tackle	San Jose State
6	84	Oscar Donahue	End	San Jose State
7	98	Gary Cutsinger	Tackle	Oklahoma State
8	112	Jim Tullis	Back	Florida A&M
9	126	Peter Schenck	Back	Washington State
10	140	Gale Weidner	Quarterback	Colorado
11	154	Jim Thrush	Tackle	Xavier
12	158	Joe Thorne	Back	South Dakota State
12	168	Tom Pennington	Back	Georgia
13	182	Tom Kepner	Tackle	Villanova
14	196	Ernie Green	Back	Louisville
15	210	Roger Holdinsky	Back	West Virginia
16	224	Jimmy Field	Back	LSU
17	238	Buck Buchanan	Tackle	Grambling
18	252	Bob Joiner	Quarterback	Presbyterian
19	266	Jerry Scattini	Halfback	California
20	280	Mike Snodgrass	Center	Western Michigan

- Yellow indicates a future Pro Bowl selection

== Personnel ==
=== Staff ===
1962 Green Bay Packers staff
Front office: President – Dominic Olejniczak; Director of player personnel – Dick Voris; Head coaches: Head coach – Vince Lombardi; Offensive coaches: Offensive backs – Red Cochran; Offensive ends – Tom Fears; Ends – Dick Voris; Offensive line – Bill Austin	Defensive coaches: Defensive line – Phil Bengtson; Defensive backs – Norb Hecker

=== Roster ===
1962 Green Bay Packers roster
Quarterbacks (QB): 10 John Roach; 15 Bart Starr; Running backs (RB): 40 Earl Gros; 5 Paul Hornung K; 25 Tom Moore; 22 Elijah Pitts; 31 Jim Taylor; Wide receivers (WR): 80 Gary Barnes; 33 Lew Carpenter; 86 Boyd Dowler; 85 Max McGee; Tight ends (TE): 84 Gary Knafelc; 88 Ron Kramer	Offensive linemen (OL): 60 Ed Blaine G; 75 Forrest Gregg T; 64 Jerry Kramer G/K; 78 Norm Masters T; 51 Jim Ringo C; 76 Bob Skoronski T; 63 Fuzzy Thurston G; Defensive linemen (DL): 87 Willie Davis DE; 71 Ron Gassert DT/DE; 79 Dave Hanner DT; 74 Henry Jordan DT; 77 Ron Kostelnik DT; 83 Bill Quinlan DE	Linebackers (LB): 58 Dan Currie OLB; 71 Bill Forester OLB; 53 Ken Iman OLB/C; 66 Ray Nitschke MLB; 61 Nelson Toburen OLB; Defensive backs (DB): 26 Herb Adderley CB; 46 Hank Gremminger SS; 27 John Symank SS; 47 Jesse Whittenton CB; 24 Willie Wood FS; 29 Howie Williams CB/S; Special teams (ST)	Rookies in italics

== Preseason ==
Date	Opponent	Site	Result	Score

== Regular season ==
The team was 7–0 at home and 6–1 on the road. It was the first time since 1944 that the club went undefeated at home.

=== Schedule ===
Week	Date	Opponent	Result	Record	Venue	Attendance	Recap	Sources
1	September 16	**Minnesota Vikings**	**W** 34–7	1–0	City Stadium	38,669		
2	September 23	St. Louis Cardinals	**W** 17–0	2–0	Milwaukee County Stadium	44,885		
3	September 30	**Chicago Bears**	**W** 49–0	3–0	City Stadium	38,669		
4	October 7	**Detroit Lions**	**W** 9–7	4–0	City Stadium	38,669		
5	October 14	at **Minnesota Vikings**	**W** 48–21	5–0	Metropolitan Stadium	41,475		
6	October 21	**San Francisco 49ers**	**W** 31–13	6–0	Milwaukee County Stadium	46,010		
7	October 28	at **Baltimore Colts**	**W** 17–6	7–0	Memorial Stadium	57,966		
8	November 4	at **Chicago Bears**	**W** 38–7	8–0	Wrigley Field	48,753		
9	November 11	at Philadelphia Eagles	**W** 49–0	9–0	Franklin Field	60,671		
10	November 18	**Baltimore Colts**	**W** 17–13	10–0	City Stadium	38,669		
11	November 22	at **Detroit Lions**	**L** 14–26	10–1	Tiger Stadium	57,598		
12	December 2	**Los Angeles Rams**	**W** 41–10	11–1	Milwaukee County Stadium	46,833		
13	December 9	at **San Francisco 49ers**	**W** 31–21	12–1	Kezar Stadium	53,769		
14	December 16	at **Los Angeles Rams**	**W** 20–17	13–1	L.A. Memorial Coliseum	60,353		
Note: Intra-conference opponents are in **bold** text.

== Standings ==
NFL Western Conference
	W	L	T	PCT	CONF	PF	PA	STK
Green Bay Packers	13	1	0	.929	11–1	415	148	W3
Detroit Lions	11	3	0	.786	10–2	315	177	L1
Chicago Bears	9	5	0	.643	8–4	321	287	W2
Baltimore Colts	7	7	0	.500	5–7	293	288	W2
San Francisco 49ers	6	8	0	.429	5–7	282	331	L2
Minnesota Vikings	2	11	1	.154	1–10–1	254	410	L3
Los Angeles Rams	1	12	1	.077	1–10–1	220	334	L3

Note: Tie games were not officially counted in the standings until 1972.

=== Season summary ===
==== Week 4 vs. Lions ====
Detroit Lions (3–0) at Green Bay Packers (3–0)

Quarter	1	2	3	4	Total
Lions	0	7	0	0	7
Packers	3	0	3	3	9

at City Stadium • Green Bay, Wisconsin

- Date: October 7
- Game weather: 56 °F (13 °C) • Wind 8
- Game attendance: 38,669
- Pro-Football-Reference.com

Game information

Lions

- Milt Plum
  11/26, 107 yards, INT
  7 rush, 58 yards
- Jim Gibbons
  3 rec, 41 yards

Packers

- Bart Starr
  18/26, 198 yards
- Jim Taylor
  20 rush, 95 yards
- Max McGee
  5 rec, 69 yards

This game provides the backdrop for the Vince Lombardi book Run to Daylight!, which chronicles the week's preparation leading to the contest.

Scoring summary

Quarter	Time	Drive			Team	Scoring information	Score	
Quarter	Time	Plays	Yards	TOP	Team	Scoring information	DET	GB
1					Packers	13-yard field goal by Hornung	0	3
2					Lions	Lewis 6-yard touchdown run, Walker kick good	7	3
3					Packers	15-yard field goal by Hornung	7	6
4					Packers	26-yard field goal by Hornung	7	9
"TOP" = time of possession. For other American football terms, see Glossary of American football.							7	9

==== Week 11 vs. Lions ====
Green Bay Packers (10–0) at Detroit Lions (8–2)

Quarter	1	2	3	4	Total
Packers	0	0	0	14	14
Lions	7	16	3	0	26

at Tiger Stadium • Detroit, Michigan

- Date: November 22
- Game weather: 37 °F (3 °C) • Wind 15
- Game attendance: 57,598
- Pro-Football-Reference.com

Game information

Packers

- Bart Starr
  11/19, 142 yards, 2 INT
- Jim Taylor
  13 rush, 47 yards
- Ron Kramer
  4 rec, 62 yards

Lions

- Milt Plum
  8/16, 137 yards, 2 TD, 2 INT
- Ken Webb
  11 rush, 62 yards
- Gail Cogdill
  3 rec, 79 yards, 2 TD

The Packers suffered their only loss of the season at the hands of a Lions defense that sacked Bart Starr 11 times and intercepted him twice. The game became known as the "Thanksgiving Day Massacre".

Scoring summary

Quarter	Time	Drive			Team	Scoring information	Score	
Quarter	Time	Plays	Yards	TOP	Team	Scoring information	GB	DET
1					Lions	Cogdill 33-yard touchdown reception from Plum, Walker kick good	0	7
2					Lions	Cogdill 27-yard touchdown reception from Plum, Walker kick good	0	14
2					Lions	Fumble recovery returned 6 yards for touchdown by Williams, Walker kick good	0	21
2					Lions	Starr tackled in end zone for a safety by Brown	0	23
3					Lions	47-yard field goal by Plum	0	26
4					Packers	Fumble recovery in end zone for touchdown by Davis, Kramer kick good	7	26
4					Packers	Taylor 4-yard touchdown run, Kramer kick good	14	26
"TOP" = time of possession. For other American football terms, see Glossary of American football.							14	26

== Playoffs ==
Round	Date	Opponent	Result	Record	Venue	Attendance
NFL Championship	December 30	at New York Giants	W 16–7	1-0	Yankee Stadium	64,892

== Game summary ==
=== 1962 NFL Championship Game at New York ===
Team	1	2	3	4	Total
• Packers	3	7	3	3	16
Giants	0	0	7	0	7

- Date: December 30
- Location: Yankee Stadium • Bronx, New York
- Game weather: 25 °F (−4 °C), wind 27 mph (43 km/h)

Scoring summary
1	GB	Jerry Kramer 26-yard field goal	Packers 3–0
2	GB	Jim Taylor 7-yard run (Jerry Kramer kick)	Packers 10–0
3	NYG	Jim Collier recovered fumble in end zone (Don Chandler kick)	Packers 10–7
3	GB	Jerry Kramer 29-yard field goal	Packers 13–7
4	GB	Jerry Kramer 30-yard field goal	Packers 16–7

== Awards and records ==
- Led NFL, points scored, 415
- Bart Starr, NFL leader, passing yards, (2,438 yards)
- Jim Taylor, NFL rushing leader, (1,474 yards)
- Willie Wood, NFL leader, interceptions (9)
- Ray Nitschke, MVP of 1962 NFL Championship Game
