= 1962 Baltimore Colts season =

10th season in franchise history

- Owner: Carroll Rosenbloom
- General manager: Don "Red" Kellett
- Head coach: Weeb Ewbank
- Home stadium: Memorial Stadium

Results
- Record: 7–7
- Division place: 4th NFL Western
- Playoffs: Did not qualify

Cover of the program for the October 28 game against the Green Bay Packers.

The 1962 Baltimore Colts season was the tenth for the team in the National Football League. They finished the 1962 season with a record of 7 wins and 7 losses, in fourth place in the Western Conference, six games behind the Green Bay Packers.

The Colts lost twice each to Green Bay, Detroit, and Chicago.

After the season in January, Weeb Ewbank was succeeded as head coach by 33-year-old Don Shula, the defensive backfield coach with the Detroit Lions for three seasons.

== Roster ==
1962 Baltimore Colts roster
| Quarterbacks (QB): 14 Lamar McHan; 19 Johnny Unitas; Running backs (RB): 48 Bob Clemens; 25 Alex Hawkins; 41 Tom Matte S; 24 Lenny Moore; 34 Joe Perry; 32 Mark Smolinski; Wide receivers (WR): 82 Raymond Berry; 28 Jimmy Orr; 27 R. C. Owens; 30 Bake Turner; Tight ends (TE): 31 Dick Bielski K; 85 Dee Mackey | Offensive linemen (OL): 61 Wiley Feagin T/G; 73 Tom Gilburg T/P; 64 Bill Kirchiro G; 77 Jim Parker G/T; 60 George Preas T; 68 Alex Sandusky G; 71 Dan Sullivan G/T; 52 Dick Szymanski C; Defensive linemen (DL): 81 Ordell Braase DE; 75 Jim Colvin DT; 78 John Diehl DT; 89 Gino Marchetti DE; 74 Billy Ray Smith DT | Linebackers (LB): 55 Jackie Burkett OLB; 36 Bill Pellington MLB; 50 Bill Saul OLB; 66 Don Shinnick OLB; 51 Dave Yohn MLB; Defensive backs (DB): 40 Bobby Boyd CB; 26 Wendell Harris CB/K; 80 Andy Nelson SS; 46 Jim Welch FS; Special teams (ST) | Reserve: 45 Jerry Hill RB (IR); 43 Lenny Lyles CB (IR); 62 Palmer Pyle G (IR); 83 Don Thompson DE (IR); Rookies in italics |

== Regular season ==
=== Schedule ===
| Week | Date | Opponent | Result | Record | Venue | Attendance |
|---|---|---|---|---|---|---|
| 1 | September 16 | **Los Angeles Rams** | **W** 30–27 | 1–0 | Memorial Stadium | 54,796 |
| 2 | September 23 | at **Minnesota Vikings** | **W** 34–7 | 2–0 | Metropolitan Stadium | 30,787 |
| 3 | September 30 | **Detroit Lions** | **L** 20–29 | 2–1 | Memorial Stadium | 57,966 |
| 4 | October 7 | **San Francisco 49ers** | **L** 13–21 | 2–2 | Memorial Stadium | 54,158 |
| 5 | October 14 | at Cleveland Browns | **W** 36–14 | 3–2 | Cleveland Municipal Stadium | 80,132 |
| 6 | October 21 | at **Chicago Bears** | **L** 15–35 | 3–3 | Wrigley Field | 49,066 |
| 7 | October 28 | **Green Bay Packers** | **L** 6–17 | 3–4 | Memorial Stadium | 57,966 |
| 8 | November 4 | at **San Francisco 49ers** | **W** 22–3 | 4–4 | Kezar Stadium | 44,875 |
| 9 | November 11 | at **Los Angeles Rams** | **W** 14–2 | 5–4 | Los Angeles Memorial Coliseum | 39,502 |
| 10 | November 18 | at **Green Bay Packers** | **L** 13–17 | 5–5 | New City Stadium | 38,669 |
| 11 | November 25 | **Chicago Bears** | **L** 0–57 | 5–6 | Memorial Stadium | 56,164 |
| 12 | December 2 | at **Detroit Lions** | **L** 14–21 | 5–7 | Tiger Stadium | 53,012 |
| 13 | December 8 | Washington Redskins | **W** 34–21 | 6–7 | Memorial Stadium | 56,964 |
| 14 | December 16 | **Minnesota Vikings** | **W** 42–17 | 7–7 | Memorial Stadium | 53,645 |
Note: Intra-conference opponents are in **bold** text.

== Standings ==
NFL Western Conference
| | W | L | T | PCT | CONF | PF | PA | STK |
|---|---|---|---|---|---|---|---|---|
| Green Bay Packers | 13 | 1 | 0 | .929 | 11–1 | 415 | 148 | W3 |
| Detroit Lions | 11 | 3 | 0 | .786 | 10–2 | 315 | 177 | L1 |
| Chicago Bears | 9 | 5 | 0 | .643 | 8–4 | 321 | 287 | W2 |
| Baltimore Colts | 7 | 7 | 0 | .500 | 5–7 | 293 | 288 | W2 |
| San Francisco 49ers | 6 | 8 | 0 | .429 | 5–7 | 282 | 331 | L2 |
| Minnesota Vikings | 2 | 11 | 1 | .154 | 1–10–1 | 254 | 410 | L3 |
| Los Angeles Rams | 1 | 12 | 1 | .077 | 1–10–1 | 220 | 334 | L3 |

Note: Tie games were not officially counted in the standings until 1972.

== See also ==
- History of the Indianapolis Colts
- Indianapolis Colts seasons
