= John Sutro (American football) =

American football player (born 1940)

No. 68
- Position: Offensive tackle

Personal information
- Born: May 8, 1940 (age 86); Oakland, California, U.S.
- Listed height: 6 ft 4 in (1.93 m)
- Listed weight: 245 lb (111 kg)

Career information
- High school: Harry Ells (Richmond, California)
- College: San Jose State (1958-1961)
- NFL draft: 1962: 6th round, 79th overall pick
- AFL draft: 1962: 20th round, 153rd overall pick

Career history
- Green Bay Packers (1961)*; Dallas Cowboys (1962)*; San Francisco 49ers (1962)
- * Offseason or practice squad member only

Career NFL statistics
- Games played: 5
- Stats at Pro Football Reference

John Robert Sutro (born May 8, 1940) is a former player in the National Football League (NFL). He played with the San Francisco 49ers during the 1962 NFL season.
