= Oscar Donahue =

American football player (born 1937)

No. 84, 19
- Position: Wide receiver

Personal information
- Born: June 7, 1937 (age 89); U.S.
- Listed height: 6 ft 3 in (1.91 m)
- Listed weight: 195 lb (88 kg)

Career information
- College: San Jose State
- NFL draft: 1962: 6th round, 84th overall pick
- AFL draft: 1962: 12th round, 94th overall pick

Career history
- Green Bay Packers (1962)*; Minnesota Vikings (1962); Toronto Argonauts (1963)
- * Offseason or practice squad member only

Awards and highlights
- First-team All-PCC (1961)

Career NFL statistics
- Receptions: 16
- Receiving yards: 285
- Touchdowns: 1
- Stats at Pro Football Reference

Oscar Donahue (born June 7, 1937) is an American former professional football player who was a wide receiver for the Minnesota Vikings of the National Football League (NFL) in 1962. He played college football for the San Jose State Spartans.
