= Bob Toneff =

American football player (1930–2015)

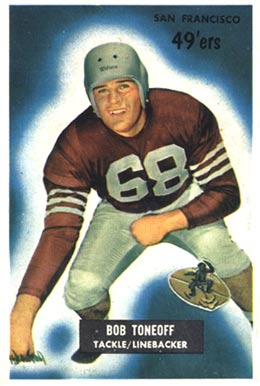
- Toneff on a 1955 Bowman football card

No. 62, 74, 79
- Positions: Defensive tackle, defensive end, linebacker, offensive tackle, guard

Personal information
- Born: June 23, 1930; Detroit, Michigan, U.S.
- Died: March 15, 2015 (aged 84); San Anselmo, California, U.S.
- Listed height: 6 ft 2 in (1.88 m)
- Listed weight: 260 lb (118 kg)

Career information
- High school: Barberton (Barberton, Ohio)
- College: Notre Dame (1948–1951)
- NFL draft: 1952: 2nd round, 22nd overall pick

Career history
- San Francisco 49ers (1952–1958); Washington Redskins (1959–1964)

Awards and highlights
- 3× Second-team All-Pro (1955, 1960, 1962); 4× Pro Bowl (1955, 1959-1961); National champion (1949); First-team All-American (1951)

Career NFL statistics
- Interceptions: 2
- Fumble recoveries: 15
- Sacks: 6.5
- Stats at Pro Football Reference

Robert Toneff (June 23, 1930 – March 15, 2015) was an American professional football player who was a defensive tackle in the National Football League (NFL) for the San Francisco 49ers and Washington Redskins. He went to four Pro Bowls during his 13-year career. Toneff played college football for the Notre Dame Fighting Irish and was selected in the second round of the 1952 NFL draft.
