= Chuck Moore (American football) =

American football player (born 1940)

No. 70
- Position: Guard

Personal information
- Born: January 3, 1940 (age 86); Marianna, Arkansas, U.S.

Career information
- College: Arkansas

Career history
- 1962: Washington Redskins
- Stats at Pro Football Reference

Charles Dewell Moore (born January 3, 1940) is an American former professional football offensive lineman in the National Football League (NFL) for the Washington Redskins. He played college football at the University of Arkansas.
