= 1962 Los Angeles Rams season =

NFL team season

- Owner: Dan Reeves
- Head coach: Bob Waterfield / Harland Svare
- Home stadium: Los Angeles Memorial Coliseum

Results
- Record: 1–12–1
- Division place: 7th NFL Western
- Playoffs: Did not qualify

Uniform
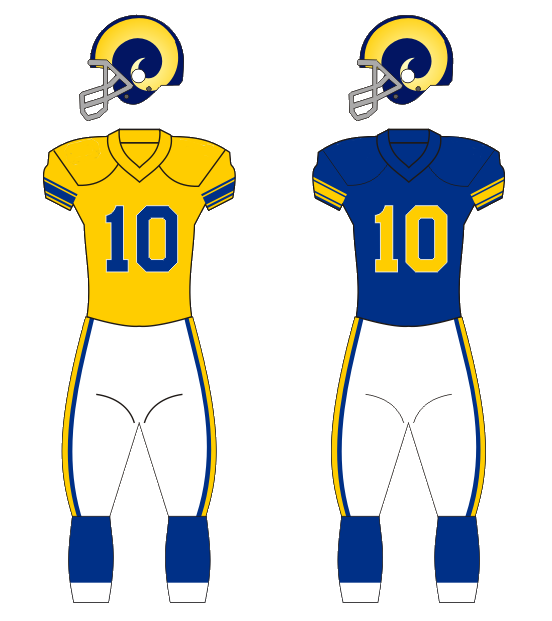

The 1962 Los Angeles Rams season was the team's 25th year with the National Football League and the 17th season in Los Angeles. Eventual Hall of Famer Bob Waterfield, the team's head coach for the past two seasons, returned and led the Rams to a 1–7 record before being fired. Harland Svare, Waterfield's successor, led the Rams to a 0–5–1 record to finish the season.

== NFL draft ==
1962 Los Angeles Rams Draft
Round	Selection	Player	Position	College
1	2	Roman Gabriel	Quarterback	North Carolina State
1	3	Merlin Olsen	Defensive Tackle	Utah State University
12	156	Marv Marinovich	Guard	University of Southern California

== Regular season ==
=== Schedule ===
Week	Date	Opponent	Result	Record	Venue	Attendance
1	September 16	at **Baltimore Colts**	**L** 27–30	0–1	Memorial Stadium	54,796
2	September 23	**Chicago Bears**	**L** 23–27	0–2	Los Angeles Memorial Coliseum	44,376
3	September 30	Dallas Cowboys	**L** 17–27	0–3	Los Angeles Memorial Coliseum	26,907
4	October 7	at Washington Redskins	**L** 14–20	0–4	D.C. Stadium	38,264
5	October 14	at **Detroit Lions**	**L** 10–13	0–5	Tiger Stadium	53,714
6	October 21	**Minnesota Vikings**	**L** 14–38	0–6	Los Angeles Memorial Coliseum	33,071
7	October 28	at **San Francisco 49ers**	**W** 28–14	1–6	Kezar Stadium	51,033
8	November 4	**Detroit Lions**	**L** 3–12	1–7	Los Angeles Memorial Coliseum	44,241
9	November 11	**Baltimore Colts**	**L** 2–14	1–8	Los Angeles Memorial Coliseum	39,502
10	November 18	**San Francisco 49ers**	**L** 17–24	1–9	Los Angeles Memorial Coliseum	42,554
11	November 25	at **Minnesota Vikings**	**T** 24–24	1–9–1	Metropolitan Stadium	26,728
12	December 2	at **Green Bay Packers**	**L** 10–41	1–10–1	Milwaukee County Stadium	46,833
13	December 9	at **Chicago Bears**	**L** 14–30	1–11–1	Wrigley Field	38,685
14	December 16	**Green Bay Packers**	**L** 17–20	1–12–1	Los Angeles Memorial Colisuem	60,057
Note: Intra-conference opponents are in **bold** text.

== Roster ==
1962 Los Angeles Rams roster
Quarterbacks (QB): 12 Zeke Bratkowski; 18 Roman Gabriel; 9 Ron Miller; Running backs (RB): 26 Jon Arnett; 22 Dick Bass; 37 Art Perkins; 34 Glenn Shaw; Wide receivers (WR): 27 Pervis Atkins; 81 Carroll Dale; 88 Karl Finch; 33 Ollie Matson; Tight ends (TE): 82 Jim Phillips	Offensive linemen (OL): 78 Jim Boeke T; 63 Joe Carollo T; 73 Charley Cowan G; 31 Larry Hayes C/OLB; 61 Duane Putnam G; 48 Les Richter C/MLB; 71 Joe Scibelli G; 70 Frank Varrichione T; Defensive linemen (DL): 75 Deacon Jones DE; 76 John LoVetere DT; 85 Lamar Lundy DE/DT; 74 Merlin Olsen DT; 79 Larry Stephens DT/DE	Linebackers (LB): 53 Mike Henry OLB; 57 Bill Jobko OLB; 86 Marlin McKeever MLB/OLB; 32 Jack Pardee OLB; Defensive backs (DB): 17 Charley Britt FS; 41 Lindon Crow SS; 46 Alvin Hall CB; 21 Eddie Meador CB; 47 Carver Shannon CB; 23 Bobby Smith FS; Special teams (ST): 11 Danny Villanueva K/P	Reserve: 25 Duane Allen TE (IR); 56 Art Hunter C (IR); Rookies in italics

== Standings ==
NFL Western Conference
	W	L	T	PCT	CONF	PF	PA	STK
Green Bay Packers	13	1	0	.929	11–1	415	148	W3
Detroit Lions	11	3	0	.786	10–2	315	177	L1
Chicago Bears	9	5	0	.643	8–4	321	287	W2
Baltimore Colts	7	7	0	.500	5–7	293	288	W2
San Francisco 49ers	6	8	0	.429	5–7	282	331	L2
Minnesota Vikings	2	11	1	.154	1–10–1	254	410	L3
Los Angeles Rams	1	12	1	.077	1–10–1	220	334	L3

Note: Tie games were not officially counted in the standings until 1972.
