= 1962 Detroit Lions season =

NFL team season (won NFL Playoff Bowl)

- Head coach: George Wilson
- Home stadium: Tiger Stadium

Results
- Record: 11–3
- Division place: 2nd NFL Western
- Playoffs: Won NFL Playoff Bowl (vs. Steelers) 17–10

The 1962 Detroit Lions season was the 33rd season in franchise history. In one of the best regular seasons in their history, the Lions posted an 11–3 record (.786), but finished two games behind the eventual NFL champion Green Bay Packers in the NFL Western Conference. It was the third straight season the Lions finished as runner-up to the Packers in the West. Entering the final weekend, Detroit was one game behind and had won seven consecutive, but were shut out 3–0 by the Chicago Bears. The Lions' three losses, all on the road, were by a total of eight points.

As conference runner-up, Detroit won their third consecutive Playoff Bowl game over the Pittsburgh Steelers, 17–10. The third place game was played at the Orange Bowl in Miami on January 6, three weeks after the end of the regular season.

The Lions never trailed by more than seven points at any point in any game during the season, a feat that was not repeated for 48 years. Their 26–14 win over the Packers on Thanksgiving Day in week 11 denied defending champion Green Bay the NFL's first true perfect season. The Lions were up 26–0 in the fourth quarter before Green Bay scored two touchdowns; the Packers had won the first meeting 9–7 in the mud in Green Bay with a late field goal on October 7.

After the season, defensive coordinator Don Shula left to become the head coach for the Baltimore Colts, a position he would hold for seven years.

== Offseason ==
=== NFL draft ===
Round	Pick	Player	Position	School
1	10	John Hadl	Back	Kansas

== Regular season ==
According to the team, a total of 35,693 season tickets were sold by the Lions for the 1962 campaign. The Lions played their home games in Briggs Stadium (Tiger Stadium), which had a regular listed seating capacity of 46,194, with an additional 7,000 bleacher seats for football to bring total capacity to 53,194.

=== Schedule ===
Game	Date	Opponent	Result	Record	Venue	Attendance	Recap	Sources
1	September 16	Pittsburgh Steelers	**W** 45–7	1–0	Tiger Stadium	46,641	Recap	
2	September 23	**San Francisco 49ers**	**W** 45–24	2–0	Tiger Stadium	51,032	Recap	
3	September 30	at **Baltimore Colts**	**W** 29–20	3–0	Memorial Stadium	57,966	Recap	
4	October 7	at **Green Bay Packers**	**L** 7–9	3–1	City Stadium	38,669	Recap	
5	October 14	**Los Angeles Rams**	**W** 13–10	4–1	Tiger Stadium	53,714	Recap	
6	October 21	at New York Giants	**L** 14–17	4–2	Yankee Stadium	62,856	Recap	
7	October 28	**Chicago Bears**	**W** 11–3	5–2	Tiger Stadium	53,342	Recap	
8	November 4	at **Los Angeles Rams**	**W** 12–3	6–2	L.A. Memorial Coliseum	44,241	Recap	
9	November 11	at **San Francisco 49ers**	**W** 38–24	7–2	Kezar Stadium	43,449	Recap	
10	November 18	at **Minnesota Vikings**	**W** 17–6	8–2	Metropolitan Stadium	31,257	Recap	
11	November 22	**Green Bay Packers**	**W** 26–14	9–2	Tiger Stadium	57,598	Recap	
12	December 2	**Baltimore Colts**	**W** 21–14	10–2	Tiger Stadium	53,012	Recap	
13	December 9	**Minnesota Vikings**	**W** 37–23	11–2	Tiger Stadium	42,256	Recap	
14	December 16	at **Chicago Bears**	**L** 0–3	11–3	Wrigley Field	44,948	Recap	
Note: Intra-conference opponents are in **bold** text. Thanksgiving: November 22.

=== Season summary ===
==== Week 4 at Packers ====
Detroit Lions (3–0) at Green Bay Packers (3–0)

Quarter	1	2	3	4	Total
Lions	0	7	0	0	**7**
Packers	3	0	3	3	**9**

at City Stadium • Green Bay, Wisconsin

- Date: October 7
- Game weather: 56 °F (13 °C) • Wind 8 mph (13 km/h)
- Game attendance: 38,669
- Pro-Football-Reference.com

Game information

Lions

- Milt Plum
  11/26, 107 Yds, INT
  7 Rush, 58 Yds
- Jim Gibbons
  3 Rec, 41 Yds

Packers

- Bart Starr
  18/26, 198 Yds
- Jim Taylor
  20 Rush, 95 Yds
- Max McGee
  5 Rec, 69 Yds

This game provided the backdrop for the Vince Lombardi book Run to Daylight!, chronicling a typical week in the life of a pro football team. Alex Karras reportedly threw a helmet at Milt Plum in the locker room after the game for throwing the late interception that led to the Lions' defeat.

Scoring summary

Quarter	Time	Drive			Team	Scoring information	Score	
Quarter	Time	Plays	Yards	TOP	Team	Scoring information	DET	GB
1					Packers	13-yard field goal by Hornung	0	3
2					Lions	Lewis 6-yard touchdown run, Walker kick good	7	3
3					Packers	15-yard field goal by Hornung	7	6
4					Packers	26-yard field goal by Hornung	7	9
"TOP" = time of possession. For other American football terms, see Glossary of American football.							7	9

==== Week 11 vs. Packers ====
Green Bay Packers (10–0) at Detroit Lions (8–2)

Quarter	1	2	3	4	Total
Packers	0	0	0	14	**14**
Lions	7	16	3	0	**26**

at Tiger Stadium • Detroit, Michigan

- Date: November 22
- Game weather: 37 °F (3 °C) • Wind 15 mph (24 km/h)
- Game attendance: 57,598
- Pro-Football-Reference.com

Game information

Packers

- Bart Starr
  11/19, 142 Yds, 2 INT
- Jim Taylor
  13 Rush, 47 Yds
- Ron Kramer
  4 Rec, 62 Yds

Lions

- Milt Plum
  8/16, 137 Yds, 2 TD, 2 INT
- Ken Webb
  11 Rush, 62 Yds
- Gail Cogdill
  3 Rec, 79 Yds, 2 TD

The game was dubbed the "Thanksgiving Day Massacre" thanks to the dominant performance of the Lions defense, who sacked Bart Starr 11 times. It was Green Bay's sole loss of the season; they repeated as NFL champions.

Scoring summary

Quarter	Time	Drive			Team	Scoring information	Score	
Quarter	Time	Plays	Yards	TOP	Team	Scoring information	GB	DET
1					Lions	Cogdill 33-yard touchdown reception from Plum, Walker kick good	0	7
2					Lions	Cogdill 27-yard touchdown reception from Plum, Walker kick good	0	14
2					Lions	Fumble recovery returned 6 yards for touchdown by Williams, Walker kick good	0	21
2					Lions	Starr tackled in end zone for a safety by Brown	0	23
3					Lions	47-yard field goal by Plum	0	26
4					Packers	Fumble recovery in end zone for touchdown by Davis, Kramer kick good	7	26
4					Packers	Taylor 4-yard touchdown run, Kramer kick good	14	26
"TOP" = time of possession. For other American football terms, see Glossary of American football.							14	26

== Standings ==
NFL Western Conference
	W	L	T	PCT	CONF	PF	PA	STK
Green Bay Packers	13	1	0	.929	11–1	415	148	W3
Detroit Lions	11	3	0	.786	10–2	315	177	L1
Chicago Bears	9	5	0	.643	8–4	321	287	W2
Baltimore Colts	7	7	0	.500	5–7	293	288	W2
San Francisco 49ers	6	8	0	.429	5–7	282	331	L2
Minnesota Vikings	2	11	1	.154	1–10–1	254	410	L3
Los Angeles Rams	1	12	1	.077	1–10–1	220	334	L3

Note: Tie games were not officially counted in the standings until 1972.

== Roster ==
1962 Detroit Lions roster
Quarterbacks: 14 Earl Morrall; 16 Milt Plum K; Running backs: 45 Dan Lewis; 33 Nick Pietrosante; 23 Tom Watkins; 34 Ken Webb; Wide receivers: 89 Gail Cogdill; 86 Tom Hall; 82 Harlon Hill; 25 Pat Studstill; Tight ends: 80 Jim Gibbons; 85 Larry Vargo	Offensive linemen: 79 John Gonzaga T; 75 John Gordy G; 77 Dan LaRose T; 64 John Lomakoski T; 50 Bob Scholtz T; 66 Harley Sewell G; 73 Paul Ward G; 51 Bob Whitlow C; Defensive linemen: 74 Mike Bundra DT; 76 Roger Brown DT; 71 Alex Karras DT; 78 Darris McCord DE; 84 Leo Sugar DE; 88 Sam Williams DE	Linebackers: 57 Carl Brettschneider OLB; 52 Dave Lloyd OLB; 64 Max Messner OLB; 56 Joe Schmidt MLB; 55 Wayne Walker K/OLB; Defensive backs: 81 Night Train Lane CB; 28 Yale Lary FS/P; 44 Dick LeBeau CB/SS; 43 Gary Lowe SS; 21 Bruce Maher CB	Inactive: 41 Terry Barr WR; 20 Dick Compton RB; 67 Dick Mills G; Note: rookies in italics

== Playoff Bowl ==
The game matched the conference runners-up for third place in the league and was played three weeks after the end of the regular season (and a week after the championship game). The ten editions of the Playoff Bowl, all held at the Orange Bowl in Miami, Florida, are now considered exhibition games by the NFL, not post-season contests.

Round	Date	Opponent	Result	Venue	Attendance
Playoff Bowl	January 6, 1963	vs. Pittsburgh Steelers	W 17–10	Orange Bowl	36,284

== Awards and records ==
- The Lions were only the third NFL team since 1940 that never trailed by more than 7 points at any time during the season. This feat was not repeated until the Green Bay Packers did so in their Super Bowl-winning 2010 season.

== See also ==
- 1962 in Michigan
