= 1969 Dallas Cowboys season =

NFL team season

- Owner: Clint Murchison, Jr.
- General manager: Tex Schramm
- Head coach: Tom Landry
- Home stadium: Cotton Bowl

Results
- Record: 11–2–1
- Division place: 1st NFL Capitol
- Playoffs: Lost Eastern Conference Championship Game (vs. Browns) 14–38; Lost NFL Playoff Bowl (vs. Rams) 0–31

The 1969 Dallas Cowboys season was their tenth in the National Football League (NFL). The team nearly equalled their previous output of 12–2, winning eleven games with one tie, and qualified for the playoffs for the fourth consecutive season.

The Cowboys were second in the NFL in scoring (369 points), and led the league in rushing yards (2,276) and total yards (5,122). The Cowboys' defense also allowed the fewest rushing yards in the NFL (1,050) and the fewest rushing touchdowns (3).

Until 2025, Dallas' tie against the San Francisco 49ers was their most recent in franchise history. On September 28, 2025, The Cowboys tied the Green Bay Packers 40–40, their first tie in 56 seasons and their first tie in the overtime era.

Dallas' regular season finale vs. the archrival Washington Redskins was the last game for legendary coach Vince Lombardi. Lombardi, who led Washington to a 7–5–2 record in his first, and what turned out to be only, season with the Redskins, died of colorectal cancer 17 days before the start of the 1970 season. Lombardi's Green Bay Packers handed the Cowboys painful losses in the 1966 and 1967 NFL championship games.

== Offseason ==
=== NFL draft ===
1969 Dallas Cowboys draft
Round	Pick	Player	Position	College	Notes
1	24	Calvin Hill *	RB	Yale	
2	29	Richmond Flowers Jr.	S	Tennessee	
3	68	Tom Stincic	LB	Michigan	
3	74	Halvor Hagen	OG	Weber State	
5	125	Chuck Kyle	LB	Purdue	
6	152	Rick Shaw	WR	Arizona State	
7	180	Larry Bales	WR	Emory and Henry	
8	205	Elmer Benhardt	LB	Missouri	
9	230	Claxton Welch	RB	Oregon	
10	258	Stuart Gottlieb	OT	Weber State	
11	283	Clarence Williams	DE	Prairie View A&M	Made the team's taxi squad
12	308	Bob Belden	QB	Notre Dame	
13	336	Rene Matison	WR	New Mexico	
14	361	Gerald Lutri	OT	Northern Michigan	
15	386	Bill Justus	DB	Tennessee	
16	414	Floyd Kerr	DB	Colorado State	
17	439	Bill Bailey	DT	Lewis & Clark	
Made roster † Pro Football Hall of Fame * Made at least one Pro Bowl during career

=== Undrafted free agents ===
1969 undrafted free agents of note
Player	Position	College
Carson Brooks	linebacker	Illinois
Tom Fee	Guard	Portland State
Frank Spaziani	Quarterback	Penn State

== Roster ==
Dallas Cowboys 1969 roster
Quarterbacks: 14 Craig Morton; 12 Roger Staubach; Running backs: 32 Walt Garrison; 35 Calvin Hill; 30 Dan Reeves; 25 Les Shy; 42 Claxton Welch; Wide receivers: 40 Bobby Joe Conrad; 22 Bob Hayes; 24 Dennis Homan; 19 Lance Rentzel; Tight ends: 89 Mike Ditka; 84 Pettis Norman	Offensive linemen: 72 Tony Liscio T; 51 Dave Manders C; 73 Ralph Neely T; 76 John Niland G; 61 Blaine Nye G; 57 Malcolm Walker C; 65 John Wilbur G; 70 Rayfield Wright T; Defensive linemen: 66 George Andrie DE; 63 Larry Cole DE; 77 Ron East DT; 64 Halvor Hagen DE; 74 Bob Lilly DT; 75 Jethro Pugh DT	Linebackers: 60 Jackie Burkett OLB; 52 Dave Edwards OLB; 54 Chuck Howley OLB; 55 Lee Roy Jordan MLB; 56 Tom Stincic OLB; 53 Fred Whittingham MLB; Defensive backs: 31 Otto Brown SS; 37 Phil Clark CB; 45 Richmond Flowers FS; 27 Mike Gaechter SS; 34 Cornell Green CB; 23 Mike Johnson CB; 20 Mel Renfro FS; Special teams: 83 Mike Clark K; 10 Ron Widby P	Reserve lists: 46 Craig Baynham RB (IR); -- John Douglas LB (Military); 50 D. D. Lewis LB (Military); 71 Willie Townes DE (IR); Taxi squad: 11 Bob Belden QB; 88 Reggie Rucker WR; -- Clarence Williams DE; Rookies in italics

== Schedule ==
Week	Date	Opponent	Result	Record	Game Site	Attendance	Recap
1	September 21	St. Louis Cardinals	**W** 24–3	1–0	Cotton Bowl	62,134	Recap
2	September 28	at **New Orleans Saints**	**W** 21–17	2–0	Tulane Stadium	79,567	Recap
3	October 5	at **Philadelphia Eagles**	**W** 38–7	3–0	Franklin Field	60,658	Recap
4	October 12	at Atlanta Falcons	**W** 24–17	4–0	Atlanta Stadium	54,833	Recap
5	October 19	**Philadelphia Eagles**	**W** 49–14	5–0	Cotton Bowl	71,509	Recap
6	October 27	New York Giants	**W** 25–3	6–0	Cotton Bowl	58,964	Recap
7	November 2	at Cleveland Browns	**L** 10–42	6–1	Cleveland Stadium	84,850	Recap
8	November 9	**New Orleans Saints**	**W** 33–17	7–1	Cotton Bowl	68,282	Recap
9	November 16	at **Washington Redskins**	**W** 41–28	8–1	RFK Stadium	50,474	Recap
10	November 23	at Los Angeles Rams	**L** 23–24	8–2	L.A. Coliseum	79,105	Recap
11	November 27	San Francisco 49ers	**T** 24–24	8–2–1	Cotton Bowl	62,348	Recap
12	December 7	at Pittsburgh Steelers	**W** 10–7	9–2–1	Pitt Stadium	24,990	Recap
13	December 13	Baltimore Colts	**W** 27–10	10–2–1	Cotton Bowl	63,191	Recap
14	December 21	**Washington Redskins**	**W** 20–10	11–2–1	Cotton Bowl	56,924	Recap
Note: Intra-division opponents are in **bold** text.

== Season summary ==
=== Week 9 at Redskins ===
Week Nine: Dallas Cowboys (7–1) at Washington Redskins (4–2–2)

Quarter	1	2	3	4	Total
Cowboys	17	10	7	7	41
Redskins	7	14	7	0	28

at Robert F. Kennedy Memorial Stadium, Washington, D.C.

- Date: November 16, 1969
- Game weather: 33 °F (1 °C)
- Game attendance: 50,474
- Box Score

Game information

First quarter

- DAL – Mike Clark 36-yard field goal. Cowboys 3–0.
- WSH – Jerry Smith 27-yard pass from Sonny Jurgensen (Curt Knight kick). Redskins 7–3.
- DAL – Lance Rentzel 65-yard pass from Craig Morton (Mike Clark kick). Cowboys 10–7.
- DAL – Larry Cole 41-yard interception return (Mike Clark kick). Cowboys 17–7.

Second quarter

- DAL – Calvin Hill 3-yard run (Mike Clark kick). Cowboys 24–7.
- WSH – Charley Taylor 68-yard pass from Sonny Jurgensen (Curt Knight kick). Cowboys 24–14.
- DAL – Mike Clark 14-yard field goal. Cowboys 27–14.
- WSH – Jerry Smith 11-yard pass from Sonny Jurgensen (Curt Knight kick). Cowboys 27–21.

Third quarter

- DAL – Calvin Hill 7-yard run (Mike Clark kick). Cowboys 34–21.
- WSH – Jerry Smith 20-yard pass from Sonny Jurgensen (Curt Knight kick). Cowboys 34–28.

Fourth quarter

- DAL – Dan Reeves 4-yard run (Mike Clark kick). Cowboys 41–28.

Top passers

- DAL – Craig Morton – 8/17, 156 yards, TD, INT
- WSH – Sonny Jurgensen – 24/35, 338 yards, 4 TD, 4 INT

Top rushers

- DAL – Calvin Hill – 27 rushes, 150 yards, 2 TD
- WSH – Larry Brown – 11 rushes, 38 yards

Top receivers

- DAL – Lance Rentzel – 2 receptions, 84 yards, TD
- WSH – Charley Taylor – 6 receptions, 155 yards, TD

- President Richard Nixon was in attendance.

== Playoffs ==
Round	Date	Opponent	Result	Record	Venue	Attendance	Recap
Eastern Conference	December 28	Cleveland Browns	L 14–38	0–1	Cotton Bowl	69,321	Recap
Playoff Bowl	January 3	vs Los Angeles Rams	L 0–31	0–2	Orange Bowl	31,151	

== Standings ==
NFL Capitol
	W	L	T	PCT	DIV	CONF	PF	PA	STK
Dallas Cowboys	11	2	1	.846	6–0	9–1	369	223	W3
Washington Redskins	7	5	2	.583	3–2–1	6–3–1	307	319	L1
New Orleans Saints	5	9	0	.357	1–5	4–6	311	393	W1
Philadelphia Eagles	4	9	1	.308	1–4–1	4–5–1	279	377	L4

Note: Tie games were not officially counted in the standings until 1972.
