= 1974 Dallas Cowboys season =

NFL team season

- Owner: Clint Murchison, Jr.
- General manager: Tex Schramm
- Head coach: Tom Landry
- Home stadium: Texas Stadium

Results
- Record: 8–6
- Division place: 3rd NFC East
- Playoffs: Did not qualify
- Pro Bowlers: None

The 1974 Dallas Cowboys season was their 15th in the league, all under head coach Tom Landry. The Cowboys failed to improve on their previous output of 10–4, winning only eight games. They missed the playoffs for the first time in nine years, the only time in 18 seasons (1966–1983) that the Cowboys did not advance to the postseason.

The Cowboys opened the season 1–4. Although they finished 7–2, it was not enough to overcome the slow start.

The 1974 season featured one of the most memorable Thanksgiving games in Cowboys history. Trailing 16–3 in the second half (and having already lost quarterback Roger Staubach to injury), little used backup Clint Longley threw two touchdown passes to lead the team to a 24–23 victory over the Redskins at Texas Stadium.

This was also a season of transition. It was the final season of Hall of Fame defensive tackle Bob Lilly. Also finishing their careers were fullback Walt Garrison and center Dave Manders. Also, it was the final season in Dallas for wide receiver Bob Hayes (who finished his career with the San Francisco 49ers the following year), running back Calvin Hill (who departed for the Hawaiians of the World Football League), defensive end Pat Toomay (who left for the Buffalo Bills), guard John Niland (who left the following year for the Philadelphia Eagles), and quarterback Craig Morton (traded early in the season to the New York Giants) who would later play against the Cowboys in Super Bowl XII as a member of the Denver Broncos.

== Offseason ==
=== Draft ===
1974 Dallas Cowboys draft
Round	Pick	Player	Position	College	Notes
1	1	Ed Jones *	DE	Tennessee State	
1	22	Charley Young	RB	NC State	
3	53	Danny White *	QB	Arizona State	
3	72	Cal Peterson	LB	UCLA	
4	97	Ken Hutcherson	LB	Livingston	
4	101	Andy Adrade	LB	Northern Michigan	
5	126	John Kelsey	OT	Missouri	Signed with the WFL
6	151	Jim Bright	S	UCLA	Signed with the WFL
7	176	Raymond Nester	LB	Michigan State	
8	205	Mike Holt	DB	Michigan State	
8	230	Bill Dulin	OT	Johnson C. Smith	
10	255	Dennis Morgan	RB	Western Illinois	
11	280	Harvey McGee	WR	Southern Mississippi	
12	309	Keith Bobo	QB	SMU	
13	334	Fred Lima	K	Colorado	
14	359	Doug Richards	DB	BYU	
15	384	Bruce Craft	OT	Geneva College	
16	413	Gene Killian	OG	Tennessee	
17	438	Lawrie Skolrood	OT	North Dakota	Signed with the CFL
Made roster † Pro Football Hall of Fame * Made at least one Pro Bowl during career

== Roster ==
Dallas Cowboys 1974 roster
Quarterbacks: 19 Clint Longley; 12 Roger Staubach; Running backs: 21 Doug Dennison; 32 Walt Garrison; 35 Calvin Hill; 37 Dennis Morgan; 44 Robert Newhouse; 40 Les Strayhorn; 30 Charley Young; Wide receivers: 22 Bob Hayes; 86 Bill Houston; 88 Drew Pearson; 83 Golden Richards; Tight ends: 89 Billy Joe DuPree; 84 Jean Fugett; 87 Ron Howard	Offensive linemen: 64 Jim Arneson C/G; 62 John Fitzgerald C; 60 Gene Killian G/T; 51 Dave Manders C; 73 Ralph Neely T; 76 John Niland G; 61 Blaine Nye G; 78 Bruce Walton T; 70 Rayfield Wright T; Defensive linemen: 63 Larry Cole DE; 77 Bill Gregory DT; 72 Ed Jones DE; 74 Bob Lilly DT; 79 Harvey Martin DE; 75 Jethro Pugh DT; 67 Pat Toomay DE	Linebackers: 52 Dave Edwards OLB; 59 Ken Hutcherson OLB; 55 Lee Roy Jordan MLB; 50 D. D. Lewis OLB; 58 Cal Peterson OLB; 57 Louie Walker MLB; Defensive backs: 31 Benny Barnes CB; 34 Cornell Green SS; 43 Cliff Harris FS; 20 Mel Renfro CB; 46 Mark Washington CB; 41 Charlie Waters CB/S; Special teams: 10 Duane Carrell P; 1 Efrén Herrera K	Reserve lists: 15 Toni Fritsch K (IR); 71 Rodney Wallace T/G (IR); Rookies in italics 46 active, 2 inactive

== Schedule ==
Week	Date	Opponent	Result	Record	Game Site	Attendance	Recap
1	September 15	at Atlanta Falcons	**W** 24–0	1–0	Atlanta Stadium	52,332	Recap
2	September 23	at **Philadelphia Eagles**	**L** 10–13	1–1	Veterans Stadium	64,089	Recap
3	September 29	**New York Giants**	**L** 6–14	1–2	Texas Stadium	45,841	Recap
4	October 6	Minnesota Vikings	**L** 21–23	1–3	Texas Stadium	57,847	Recap
5	October 13	at **St. Louis Cardinals**	**L** 28–31	1–4	Busch Memorial Stadium	49,885	Recap
6	October 20	**Philadelphia Eagles**	**W** 31–24	2–4	Texas Stadium	43,586	Recap
7	October 27	at **New York Giants**	**W** 21–7	3–4	Yale Bowl	57,381	Recap
8	November 3	**St. Louis Cardinals**	**W** 17–14	4–4	Texas Stadium	64,146	Recap
9	November 10	San Francisco 49ers	**W** 20–14	5–4	Texas Stadium	50,018	Recap
10	November 17	at **Washington Redskins**	**L** 21–28	5–5	RFK Stadium	54,395	Recap
11	November 24	at Houston Oilers	**W** 10–0	6–5	Houston Astrodome	49,775	Recap
12	November 28	**Washington Redskins**	**W** 24–23	7–5	Texas Stadium	63,243	Recap
13	December 7	Cleveland Browns	**W** 41–17	8–5	Texas Stadium	48,754	Recap
14	December 14	at Oakland Raiders	**L** 23–27	8–6	Oakland–Alameda County Coliseum	45,840	Recap

Division opponents are in bold text

== Game summaries ==
=== Week 3 vs Giants ===
New York Giants (1–1) at Dallas Cowboys (1–1)

Quarter	1	2	3	4	Total
Giants	0	14	0	0	14
Cowboys	0	0	0	6	6

at Texas Stadium • Irving, Texas

- Date: September 29
- Game time: 2:00 p.m.
- Game weather: 64 °F (18 °C) • Wind 7 miles per hour (11 km/h; 6.1 kn)
- Game attendance: 45,841
- Pro-Football-Reference.com

Game information

Giants

- Norm Snead
  11/17, 128 Yds, TD
- Joe Dawkins
  9 Rush, 51 Yds
- Bob Grim
  1 Rec, 50 Yds

Cowboys

- Roger Staubach
  20/37, 256 Yds, TD, 3 INT
- Robert Newhouse
  12 Rush, 47 Yds
- Drew Pearson
  6 Rec, 116 Yds

Scoring summary

Quarter	Time	Drive			Team	Scoring information	Score	
Quarter	Time	Plays	Yards	TOP	Team	Scoring information	NYG	DAL
2					Giants	Doug Kotar 2-yard touchdown run, Pete Gogolak kick good	7	0
4					Giants	Joe Dawkins 14-yard touchdown reception from Norm Snead, Pete Gogolak kick good	14	0
4					Cowboys	Bob Hayes 35-yard touchdown reception from Roger Staubach, Mac Percival kick no good	14	6
"TOP" = time of possession. For other American football terms, see Glossary of American football.							14	6

This would be the last time the Giants defeated the Cowboys until Week 10 of the 1980 season, a streak of 12 straight wins by Dallas.

=== Week 6 vs Eagles ===
Week 6: Philadelphia Eagles (4–1) at Dallas Cowboys (1–4)

Quarter	1	2	3	4	Total
Eagles	0	17	7	0	24
Cowboys	0	14	10	7	31

at Texas Stadium • Irving, Texas

- Date: October 20
- Game time: 1:00 p.m.
- Game weather: 62 °F (17 °C) • Wind 6 miles per hour (9.7 km/h; 5.2 kn)
- Game attendance: 43,586
- Pro-Football-Reference.com

Game information

Eagles

- Roman Gabriel
  21/36, 285 Yds, 2 TD, INT
- Po James
  6 Rush, 24 Yds, TD
- Harold Carmichael
  5 Rec, 85 Yds, TD

Cowboys

- Roger Staubach
  18/27, 224 Yds
- Calvin Hill
  26 Rush, 140 Yds, 3 TD
- Drew Pearson
  5 Rec, 77 Yds

Scoring summary

Quarter	Time	Drive			Team	Scoring information	Score	
Quarter	Time	Plays	Yards	TOP	Team	Scoring information	PHI	DAL
2					Cowboys	Calvin Hill 5-yard touchdown run, Efrén Herrera kick good	0	7
2					Eagles	Harold Carmichael 14-yard touchdown reception from Roman Gabriel, Tom Dempsey kick good	7	7
2					Cowboys	Calvin Hill 17-yard touchdown run, Efrén Herrera kick good	7	14
2					Eagles	Po James 1-yard touchdown run, Tom Dempsey kick good	14	14
2					Eagles	39-yard field goal by Tom Dempsey	17	14
3					Cowboys	29-yard field goal by Efrén Herrera	17	17
3					Eagles	Don Zimmerman 64-yard touchdown reception from Roman Gabriel, Tom Dempsey kick good	24	17
3					Cowboys	Calvin Hill 2-yard touchdown run, Efrén Herrera kick good	24	24
4					Cowboys	Roger Staubach 1-yard touchdown run, Efrén Herrera kick good	24	31
"TOP" = time of possession. For other American football terms, see Glossary of American football.							24	31

=== Week 12 vs Redskins ===
Washington Redskins (8–3) at Dallas Cowboys (6–5)

Quarter	1	2	3	4	Total
Redskins	3	6	7	7	23
Cowboys	3	0	14	7	24

at Texas Stadium, Irving, Texas

- Date: November 28
- Game time: 4:00 p.m. EST
- Game weather: 50 °F (10 °C)
- Game attendance: 63,243
- Referee: Jim Tunney
- Pro-Football-Reference.com

Game information

First quarter

- DAL – Efrén Herrera 24-yard field goal. Cowboys 3–0. Drive:
- WSH – Mark Moseley 45-yard field goal. Tie 3–3. Drive:

Second quarter

- WSH – Mark Moseley 34-yard field goal. Redskins 6–3. Drive:
- WSH – Mark Moseley 39-yard field goal. Redskins 9–3. Drive:

Third quarter

- WSH – Duane Thomas 9-yard pass from Billy Kilmer (Mark Moseley kick). Redskins 16–3. Drive:
- DAL – Billy Joe Dupree 35-yard pass from Clint Longley (Efrén Herrera kick). Redskins 16–10. Drive:
- DAL – Walt Garrison 70-yard run (Efrén Herrera kick). Cowboys 17–16. Drive:

Fourth quarter

- WSH – Duane Thomas 19-yard run (Mark Moseley kick). Redskins 23–17. Drive:
- DAL – Drew Pearson 50-yard pass from Clint Longley (Efrén Herrera kick), 0:28. Cowboys 24–23. Drive:

Top passers

- WSH – Billy Kilmer – 8/17, 112 yards, TD
- DAL – Clint Longley – 11/20, 203 yards, 2 TD

Top rushers

- WSH – Duane Thomas – 18 rushes, 55 yards, TD
- DAL – Robert Newhouse – 16 rushes, 66 yards

Top receivers

- WSH – Roy Jefferson – 2 receptions, 49 yards
- DAL – Drew Pearson – 5 receptions, 108 yards, TD

Thanksgiving Day

Roger Staubach was knocked out of the game.

== Standings ==
NFC East
	W	L	T	PCT	DIV	CONF	PF	PA	STK
St. Louis Cardinals	10	4	0	.714	7–1	8–3	285	218	W1
Washington Redskins	10	4	0	.714	5–3	8–3	320	196	W2
Dallas Cowboys	8	6	0	.571	4–4	6–5	297	235	L1
Philadelphia Eagles	7	7	0	.500	3–5	5–6	242	217	W3
New York Giants	2	12	0	.143	1–7	1–10	195	299	L6

== Publications ==
- The Football Encyclopedia ISBN 0-312-11435-4
- Total Football ISBN 0-06-270170-3
- Cowboys Have Always Been My Heroes ISBN 0-446-51950-2
