= 1973 Pro Bowl =

National Football League all-star game

1973 NFL Pro Bowl
| AFC | NFC |
|---|---|
| 33 | 28 |
| Head coach: Chuck Noll (Pittsburgh Steelers) | Head coach: Tom Landry (Dallas Cowboys) |
| | 1 | 2 | 3 | 4 | Total |
|---|---|---|---|---|---|
| AFC | 0 | 10 | 10 | 13 | 33 |
| NFC | 14 | 0 | 0 | 14 | 28 |
- Date: January 21, 1973
- Stadium: Texas Stadium; Irving, Texas
- MVP: O. J. Simpson (Buffalo Bills, RB)
- Referee: Dick Jorgensen
- Attendance: 47,879

TV in the United States
- Network: CBS
- Announcers: Frank Glieber, Alex Hawkins, Bruce Roberts

The 1973 Pro Bowl was the NFL's 23rd annual all-star game, which featured the outstanding performers from the 1972 season. The game was played on Sunday, January 21, 1973, at Texas Stadium in Irving, Texas. It was the first Pro Bowl not to be played at the Los Angeles Memorial Coliseum. The final score was AFC 33, NFC 28. Running back O. J. Simpson of the Buffalo Bills was named the game's Most Valuable Player.

Attendance at the game was 47,879. Chuck Noll of the Pittsburgh Steelers coached the AFC while the NFC was led by the Dallas Cowboys' Tom Landry. The game's referee was Dick Jorgensen.

Players on the winning AFC team received $2,000 each, while the NFC participants took home $1,500.

== AFC roster ==
=== Offense ===
| Position | Starter(s) | Reserve(s) |
|---|---|---|
| Quarterback | 3 Daryle Lamonica, Oakland | 21 John Hadl, San Diego; 12 Joe Namath, N.Y. Jets |
| Running back | 32 O. J. Simpson, Buffalo | 22 Mercury Morris, Miami |
| Fullback | 32 Franco Harris, Pittsburgh | 39 Larry Csonka, Miami; 44 Marv Hubbard, Oakland |
| Wide receivers | 89 Otis Taylor, Kansas City; 27 Gary Garrison, San Diego | 40 J.D. Hill, Buffalo; 42 Paul Warfield, Miami |
| Tight end | 87 Raymond Chester, Oakland | 88 Rich Caster, N.Y. Jets |
| Offensive tackle | 75 Winston Hill, N.Y. Jets; 78 Art Shell, Oakland | 78 Norm Evans, Miami |
| Offensive guard | 66 Larry Little, Miami; 63 Gene Upshaw, Oakland | 78 Walt Sweeney, San Diego |
| Center | 00 Jim Otto, Oakland | 50 Bill Curry, Baltimore |

=== Defense ===
| Position | Starter(s) | Reserve(s) |
|---|---|---|
| Defensive end | 65 Elvin Bethea, Houston; 75 Deacon Jones, San Diego | 84 Bill Stanfill, Miami; 78 Dwight White, Pittsburgh |
| Defensive tackle | 75 Joe Greene, Pittsburgh; 74 Mike Reid, Cincinnati | 70 Paul Smith, Denver |
| Outside linebacker | 34 Andy Russell, Pittsburgh; 83 Ted Hendricks, Baltimore | 78 Bobby Bell, Kansas City |
| Inside linebacker | 63 Willie Lanier, Kansas City | 85 Nick Buoniconti, Miami; 53 Henry Davis, Pittsburgh |
| Cornerback | 24 Willie Brown, Oakland; 20 Robert James, Buffalo | 18 Emmitt Thomas, Kansas City |
| Free safety | 13 Jake Scott, Miami | |
| Strong safety | 40 Dick Anderson, Miami | 29 Ken Houston, Houston |

=== Special teams ===
| Position | Starter(s) | Reserve(s) |
|---|---|---|
| Punter | 44 Jerrel Wilson, Kansas City | |
| Placekicker | 10 Roy Gerela, Pittsburgh | |
| Kick returner | 40 Bruce Laird, Baltimore | |

== NFC roster ==
=== Offense ===
| Position | Starter(s) | Reserve(s) |
|---|---|---|
| Quarterback | 17 Billy Kilmer, Washington | 16 Norm Snead, N.Y. Giants |
| Running back | 43 Larry Brown, Washington | 35 Calvin Hill, Dallas; 30 Ron Johnson, N.Y. Giants |
| Fullback | 42 John Brockington, Green Bay | 32 Walt Garrison, Dallas |
| Wide receivers | 42 John Gilliam, Minnesota; 18 Gene Washington, San Francisco | 29 Harold Jackson, Philadelphia; 42 Charley Taylor, Washington |
| Tight end | 82 Ted Kwalick, San Francisco | 86 Jim Mitchell, Atlanta |
| Offensive tackle | 70 Rayfield Wright, Dallas; 73 Ron Yary, Minnesota | 76 Rocky Freitas, Detroit; 75 George Kunz, Atlanta |
| Offensive guard | 65 Tom Mack, Los Angeles; 76 John Niland, Dallas | 69 Woody Peoples, San Francisco |
| Center | 75 Forrest Blue, San Francisco | 56 Len Hauss, Washington |

=== Defense ===
| Position | Starter(s) | Reserve(s) |
|---|---|---|
| Defensive end | 79 Coy Bacon, Los Angeles; 87 Claude Humphrey, Atlanta | 81 Jack Gregory, N.Y. Giants |
| Defensive tackle | 78 Bob Brown, Green Bay; 74 Merlin Olsen, Los Angeles | 88 Alan Page, Minnesota |
| Outside linebacker | 55 Chris Hanburger, Washington; 64 Dave Wilcox, San Francisco | 53 Fred Carr, Green Bay |
| Inside linebacker | 51 Dick Butkus, Chicago | 50 Tommy Nobis, Atlanta |
| Cornerback | 20 Lem Barney, Detroit; 37 Jimmy Johnson, San Francisco | 20 Mel Renfro, Dallas |
| Free safety | 28 Bill Bradley, Philadelphia | 22 Paul Krause, Minnesota |
| Strong safety | 34 Cornell Green, Dallas | 48 Ron Smith, Chicago |

=== Special teams ===
| Position | Starter(s) | Reserve(s) |
|---|---|---|
| Placekicker | 13 Chester Marcol, Green Bay | |
| Kick returner | 45 Speedy Duncan, Washington | |
