= 1972 Dallas Cowboys season =

NFL team season

- Owner: Clint Murchison, Jr.
- General manager: Tex Schramm
- Head coach: Tom Landry
- Home stadium: Texas Stadium

Results
- Record: 10–4
- Division place: 2nd NFC East
- Playoffs: Won Divisional Playoffs (at 49ers) 30–28; Lost NFC Championship (at Redskins) 3–26

The 1972 Dallas Cowboys season was their 13th in the league. The team failed to improve their previous output of 11–3, winning ten games. They qualified for the playoffs for the seventh consecutive season but settled for the wildcard spot. A pre-season injury to quarterback Roger Staubach and the trade of Duane Thomas (both had been integral figures in the 1971 championship team) hindered the offense, although this was mitigated somewhat since their replacements of Craig Morton and Calvin Hill were both former starters.

In the divisional playoff round, Staubach came off the bench to engineer an improbable 30–28 comeback win over the 49ers (Dallas had trailed by 28–16 with less than 2 minutes to play). The win over the 49ers still ranks as one of the all-time great Cowboys wins. However, the momentum could not carry them to a victory over Washington in the NFC Championship game.

== NFL draft ==
1972 Dallas Cowboys draft
Round	Pick	Player	Position	College	Notes
1	26	Bill Thomas	RB	Boston College	
2	35	Robert Newhouse	FB	Houston	
2	39	John Babinecz	LB	Villanova	
2	52	Charles McKee	WR	Arizona	
3	64	Mike Keller	LB	Michigan	
3	78	Marv Bateman	P	Utah	
4	83	Tim Kearney	LB	Northern Michigan	
4	90	Robert West	WR	San Diego State	
4	93	Chuck Zapiec	LB	Penn State	
6	156	Charles Bolden	DB	Iowa	
8	208	Ralph Coleman	LB	North Carolina A&T	
9	234	Roy Bell	RB	Oklahoma	Signed with the CFL
10	260	Richard Amman	DT	Florida State	
11	286	Lonnie Leonard	DE	North Carolina A&T	
12	312	Jimmy Harris	WR	Morgan State	
13	338	Jean Fugett *	TE	Amherst College	
14	363	Alan Thompson	RB	Wisconsin	Signed with the CFL
15	390	Carlos Alvarez	WR	Florida	
16	416	Gordon Longmire	QB	Utah	
17	442	Alphonso Cain	DE	Bethune–Cookman	
Made roster † Pro Football Hall of Fame * Made at least one Pro Bowl during career

== Roster ==
Dallas Cowboys 1972 roster
Quarterbacks: 14 Craig Morton; 12 Roger Staubach; Running backs: 32 Walt Garrison; 35 Calvin Hill; 23 Mike Montgomery; 44 Robert Newhouse; 30 Dan Reeves; 27 Bill Thomas; Wide receivers: 19 Lance Alworth; 22 Bob Hayes; 21 Billy Parks; 88 Ron Sellers; Tight ends: 89 Mike Ditka; 84 Jean Fugett; 87 Billy Truax	Offensive linemen: 62 John Fitzgerald C/G; 51 Dave Manders C; 73 Ralph Neely T; 76 John Niland G; 61 Blaine Nye G; 71 Rodney Wallace T/G; 70 Rayfield Wright T; Defensive linemen: 63 Larry Cole DE; 77 Bill Gregory DE/DT; 74 Bob Lilly DT; 75 Jethro Pugh DT; 67 Pat Toomay DE	Linebackers: 53 John Babinecz MLB; 86 Ralph Coleman OLB; 52 Dave Edwards OLB; 55 Lee Roy Jordan MLB; 50 D. D. Lewis OLB; Defensive backs: 26 Herb Adderley CB; 34 Cornell Green SS; 43 Cliff Harris FS; 20 Mel Renfro CB; 46 Mark Washington CB; 41 Charlie Waters CB/S; Special teams: 81 Marv Bateman P; 15 Toni Fritsch K	Reserve lists: 66 George Andrie DE (IR); 54 Chuck Howley LB (IR); 85 Tody Smith DE (NF-Ill.); Taxi Squad: 31 Benny Barnes CB; 18 Jack Concannon QB; 57 Mike Keller LB; 72 Don Talbert T; Rookies in italics 40 active, 7 inactive

== Regular season ==
Roger Staubach was lost in the 3rd pre season game with the Los Angeles Rams when Marlin McKeever tackled him. It required him to get a shoulder operation. Veteran backup Quarterback Craig Morton would lead the Cowboys for the 1972 season. When the Cowboys got down in the December 23 playoff game Tom Landry inserted Roger who led them to a come from behind 30–28 victory over San Francisco. In 1972 the Cowboys would build up big leads in games only to hang on to win. Some examples of this would be Monday Night October 30 when they hosted Detroit, the November 5 game in San Diego, a November 12 game at home versus St. Louis, and the December 9 home game against Washington. The December 18, 1972 Sports Illustrated ran a story on the 1972 Dallas Cowboys surrounding their game with the Washington Redskins on pages 20–23, and featuring Cowboy middle linebacker #55 Lee Roy Jordan on the cover.

Still another factor in the Cowboys 1972 season was that All Pro defensive tackle Bob Lilly played through an injury to his back for most all of the year, along with a bone spur near his heel and an injured muscle just above his knee. Lilly was furthermore selected for his 10th Pro Bowl but did not play in the game at Texas Stadium. Lilly had 2 1/2 sacks on the season, while overall the team totaled 32.

=== Schedule ===
Week	Date	Opponent	Result	Record	Game Site	Attendance	Recap
1	September 17	**Philadelphia Eagles**	**W** 28–6	1–0	Texas Stadium	55,850	Recap
2	September 24	at **New York Giants**	**W** 23–14	2–0	Yankee Stadium	62,725	Recap
3	October 1	at Green Bay Packers	**L** 13–16	2–1	Milwaukee County Stadium	47,103	Recap
4	October 8	Pittsburgh Steelers	**W** 17–13	3–1	Texas Stadium	65,682	Recap
5	October 15	at Baltimore Colts	**W** 21–0	4–1	Memorial Stadium	58,992	Recap
6	October 22	at **Washington Redskins**	**L** 20–24	4–2	RFK Stadium	53,039	Recap
7	October 30	Detroit Lions	**W** 28–24	5–2	Texas Stadium	65,378	Recap
8	November 5	at San Diego Chargers	**W** 34–28	6–2	San Diego Stadium	54,476	Recap
9	November 12	**St. Louis Cardinals**	**W** 33–24	7–2	Texas Stadium	65,218	Recap
10	November 19	at **Philadelphia Eagles**	**W** 28–7	8–2	Veterans Stadium	65,720	Recap
11	November 23	San Francisco 49ers	**L** 10–31	8–3	Texas Stadium	65,124	Recap
12	December 3	at **St. Louis Cardinals**	**W** 27–6	9–3	Busch Memorial Stadium	49,787	Recap
13	December 9	**Washington Redskins**	**W** 34–24	10–3	Texas Stadium	65,136	Recap
14	December 17	**New York Giants**	**L** 3–23	10–4	Texas Stadium	64,602	Recap
Note: Intra-division opponents are in **bold** text.

=== Game summaries ===
==== Week 1: vs. Philadelphia Eagles ====
Week One: Philadelphia Eagles at Dallas Cowboys – Game summary

Quarter	1	2	3	4	Total
Eagles	3	3	0	0	**6**
**Cowboys**	0	7	14	7	**28**

at Texas Stadium, Irving, Texas

- Date: September 17
- Game time: 1:00 p.m. CDT
- Game weather: 80 degrees, wind 11 mph
- Referee: Fred Wyant
- TV announcers (CBS): Don Criqui and Irv Cross
- Box Score

Game information

**First quarter**

- PHI – Tom Dempsey 30 yard field goal, Eagles 3–0

**Second quarter**

- PHI – Tom Dempsey 42 yard field goal, Eagles 6–0
- DAL – Ron Sellers 37 yard pass from Craig Morton (Toni Fritsch kick), Cowboys 7–6

**Third quarter**

- DAL – Lance Alworth 13 yard pass from Craig Morton (Toni Fritsch kick), Cowboys 14–6
- DAL – Calvin Hill 3 yard run (Toni Fritsch kick), Cowboys 21–6

**Fourth quarter**

- DAL – Robert Newhouse 1 yard run (Toni Fritsch kick), Cowboys 28–6

**Top passers**

- PHI – John Reaves – 11/19, 143 yards, 2 interceptions
- DAL – Craig Morton – 13/26, 235 yards, 2 touchdowns, 2 interceptions

**Top rushers**

- PHI – Po James – 13 carries, 28 yards
- DAL – Calvin Hill – 17 carries, 65 yards, 1 touchdown

**Top receivers**

- PHI – Harold Jackson – 9 receptions, 161 yards
- DAL – Ron Sellers – 3 receptions, 88 yards, 1 touchdown

==== Week 2: at New York Giants ====
Week Two: Dallas Cowboys at New York Giants – Game summary

Quarter	1	2	3	4	Total
**Cowboys**	7	3	3	10	**23**
Giants	0	7	0	7	**14**

at Yankee Stadium, Bronx, New York

- Date: September 24
- Game time: 1:00 p.m. EDT
- Game weather: 60 degrees, wind 8 mph
- Referee: Chuck Heberling
- TV announcers (CBS): Frank Glieber and Alex Hawkins
- Box Score

Game information

**First quarter**

- DAL – Walt Garrison 1 yard run (Toni Fritsch kick), Cowboys 7–0

**Second quarter**

- DAL – Toni Fritsch 54 yard field goal, Cowboys 10–0
- NYG – Rich Houston 55 yard pass from Norm Snead (Pete Gogolak kick), Cowboys 10–7

**Third quarter**

- DAL – Toni Fritsch 13 yard field goal, Cowboys 13–7

**Fourth quarter**

- DAL – Toni Fritsch 8 yard field goal, Cowboys 16–7
- NYG – Rich Houston 94 yard pass from Norm Snead (Pete Gogolak kick), Cowboys 16–14
- DAL – Lance Alworth 3 yard pass from Craig Morton (Toni Fritsch kick), Cowboys 23–14

**Top passers**

- DAL – Craig Morton – 15/27, 158 yards, 1 touchdown
- NYG – Norm Snead – 19/26, 298 yards, 2 touchdowns, 1 interception

**Top rushers**

- DAL – Calvin Hill – 20 carries, 91 yards
- NYG – Ron Johnson – 14 carries, 42 yards

**Top receivers**

- DAL – Billy Parks – 4 receptions, 49 yards
- NYG – Rich Houston – 5 receptions, 175 yards, 2 touchdowns

== Playoffs ==
Round	Date	Opponent	Result	Game Site	Attendance	Recap
Divisional	December 23, 1972	at San Francisco 49ers	W 30–28	Candlestick Park	61,214	Recap
NFC Championship	December 31, 1972	at Washington Redskins	L 3–26	RFK Stadium	53,129	Recap

=== Standings ===
NFC East
	W	L	T	PCT	DIV	CONF	PF	PA	STK
Washington Redskins	11	3	0	.786	7–1	10–1	336	218	L2
Dallas Cowboys	10	4	0	.714	6–2	7–4	319	240	L1
New York Giants	8	6	0	.571	5–3	7–4	331	247	W1
St. Louis Cardinals	4	9	1	.321	1–6–1	3–7–1	193	303	W2
Philadelphia Eagles	2	11	1	.179	0–7–1	0–10–1	145	352	L5

== Season recap ==
The Dallas Cowboys since its inception have always had cheerleaders, but during the team preparations to defend their World Championship title in 1972, a turning point in cheerleader history would be made with the creation of the Dallas Cowboys Cheerleaders, wearing new star spangled uniforms and performing dance routines, instead of the traditional acrobatic displays.

The Cowboys qualified for the playoffs a record seventh consecutive year.

== Trivia ==
This season marks the first time in Cowboys history they wore their white jerseys for every game. The second and only other time so far was 2010.

== Publications ==
- The Football Encyclopedia ISBN 0-312-11435-4
- Total Football ISBN 0-06-270170-3
- Cowboys Have Always Been My Heroes ISBN 0-446-51950-2
