= Bill Thomas (American football) =

American football player (born 1949)

No. 27, 28, 43
- Position: Running back

Personal information
- Born: August 7, 1949 (age 77); Ossining, New York, U.S.
- Listed height: 6 ft 2 in (1.88 m)
- Listed weight: 225 lb (102 kg)

Career information
- High school: Peekskill (NY)
- College: Boston College
- NFL draft: 1972: 1st round, 26th overall pick

Career history
- Dallas Cowboys (1972–1973); Houston Oilers (1973); Kansas City Chiefs (1974)

Career NFL statistics
- Games played: 27
- Rushing attempts-yards: 13-36
- Receptions-yards: 1-4
- Touchdowns: 0
- Stats at Pro Football Reference

William Jeffrey Thomas (born August 7, 1949) is an American former professional football player who was a running back in the National Football League (NFL) for the Dallas Cowboys, Houston Oilers and Kansas City Chiefs. He was selected by the Cowboys in the first round of the 1972 NFL draft. He played college football for the Boston College Eagles.

== Early life ==
Thomas attended Peekskill High School, before accepting a football scholarship from Boston College. In April 1970, he dislocated his left shoulder playing basketball, so he had to wear a harness during the football season, until he was forced to have surgery and miss one game. In 1971, he helped the school achieve their best record (9-2) in a season since 1954, while posting 119 carries for 598 yards and 2 touchdowns.

His versatility running and blocking was valued by the team, so he spent his playing time between the halfback and fullback positions. Fighting through injuries for most of his college career, he recorded a total of 931 career rushing yards (4.5-yard average), 2 touchdowns and was never the leading rusher on his team. He also lettered in track and ran the 200 metres.

== Professional career ==
=== Dallas Cowboys ===
Coming off their Super Bowl VI win, the Dallas Cowboys entered the 1972 NFL draft worried about the future of Duane Thomas and the injury history of Calvin Hill, so they focused on their running back depth. With their first round draft choice the team selected Thomas, who was ranked sixth overall on their draft board and with their second draft choice they selected Robert Newhouse.

He never fully recovered from the left shoulder injury he suffered in college and re-injured it during a dummy blocking drill in training camp. He went through surgery to repair the staple pin that was used to secure the shoulder in the original operation and was placed on injured reserve. He was activated for the eighth game of the 1972 season, touching the ball only twice as a rookie during kickoff returns.

On September 28, 1973, he was waived due to his lack of progress and his injury history and to make room for running back Cyril Pinder.

=== Houston Oilers ===
On October 1, 1973, the Houston Oilers claimed him off waivers and played a reserve role during the season. On August 16, 1974, he was traded to the Kansas City Chiefs in exchange for a seventh-round draft choice (#162-Mike Biehle).

=== Kansas City Chiefs ===
In 1974, he experienced some success playing special teams for the Kansas City Chiefs, returning 25 kickoffs for 571 yards. He was waived on August 2, 1975.

== Personal life ==
Thomas was a teacher for more than 27 years, while also serving as coach and administrator at Madison Park High School and Gavin Middle School. He also had a stint with the football coaching staff of Northeastern University.
