= Claxton Welch =

American football player (born 1947)

No. 42, 43
- Position: Running back

Personal information
- Born: July 3, 1947 (age 79); Portland, Oregon, U.S.
- Listed height: 5 ft 11 in (1.80 m)
- Listed weight: 203 lb (92 kg)

Career information
- High school: David Douglas (Portland)
- College: Oregon
- NFL draft: 1969: 9th round, 230th overall pick

Career history
- Dallas Cowboys (1969); New Orleans Saints (1970); Dallas Cowboys (1970–1971); Kansas City Chiefs (1972–1973); New England Patriots (1973)

Awards and highlights
- Super Bowl champion (VI); Second-team All-Pac-8 (1967)

Career NFL statistics
- Rushing yards: 83
- Rushing average: 3.2
- Receptions: 7
- Receiving yards: 21
- Total touchdowns: 2
- Stats at Pro Football Reference

Claxton Welch (born July 3, 1947) is an American former professional football player who was a running back in the National Football League (NFL) for the Dallas Cowboys, New Orleans Saints, and New England Patriots. He played college football for the Oregon Ducks.

== Early life ==
Claxton Welch was born July 3, 1947, in Portland, Oregon to Cornelia, an elementary schoolteacher, and Claxton Welch Sr., a contractor. His African American parents were natives of Alabama who met while working on a shipyard. Welch attended David Douglas High School where he was All-State in basketball and football. He accepted a football scholarship from the University of Oregon.

As a junior, he rushed for 474 yards and caught 7 passes for 109 yards. In his last year, he gained 525 rushing yards despite missing three of the last four games.

== Professional career ==
=== Dallas Cowboys (first stint) ===
Welch was selected by the Dallas Cowboys in the ninth round (230th overall) of the 1969 NFL/AFL draft. As a rookie, he was the fastest running back in training camp, but was waived and signed to the taxi squad, before being promoted to the roster on November 13. On September 13, 1970, he was waived to make room for linebacker Fred Whittingham.

=== New Orleans Saints ===
On September 15, 1970, he was claimed off waivers by the New Orleans Saints, before being cut after one game on September 22, to make room for rookie running back Vic Nyvall.

=== Dallas Cowboys (second stint) ===
On October 14, 1970, he was signed to the Cowboys' taxi squad, before being activated to play in 8 games. He is best remembered for his play against the San Francisco 49ers in the 1970 NFC Championship game, when he had 5 carries for 27 yards while giving Walt Garrison a breather. In 1971, he earned a ring as a member of the Super Bowl VI-winning Dallas Cowboys, under coach Tom Landry. He was released on September 6, 1972.

=== Kansas City Chiefs ===
On November 22, 1972, he was signed by the Kansas City Chiefs. He was cut on August 7, 1973, and signed to the taxi squad.

=== New England Patriots ===
On October 24, 1973, Welch was claimed off waivers by the New England Patriots. He was placed on the injured reserve list on December 5. He was released on August 16, 1974, after failing his physical examination. He finished his NFL career with 83 rushing yards and 7 receiving yards.
