= Blaine Nye =

American football player (born 1946)

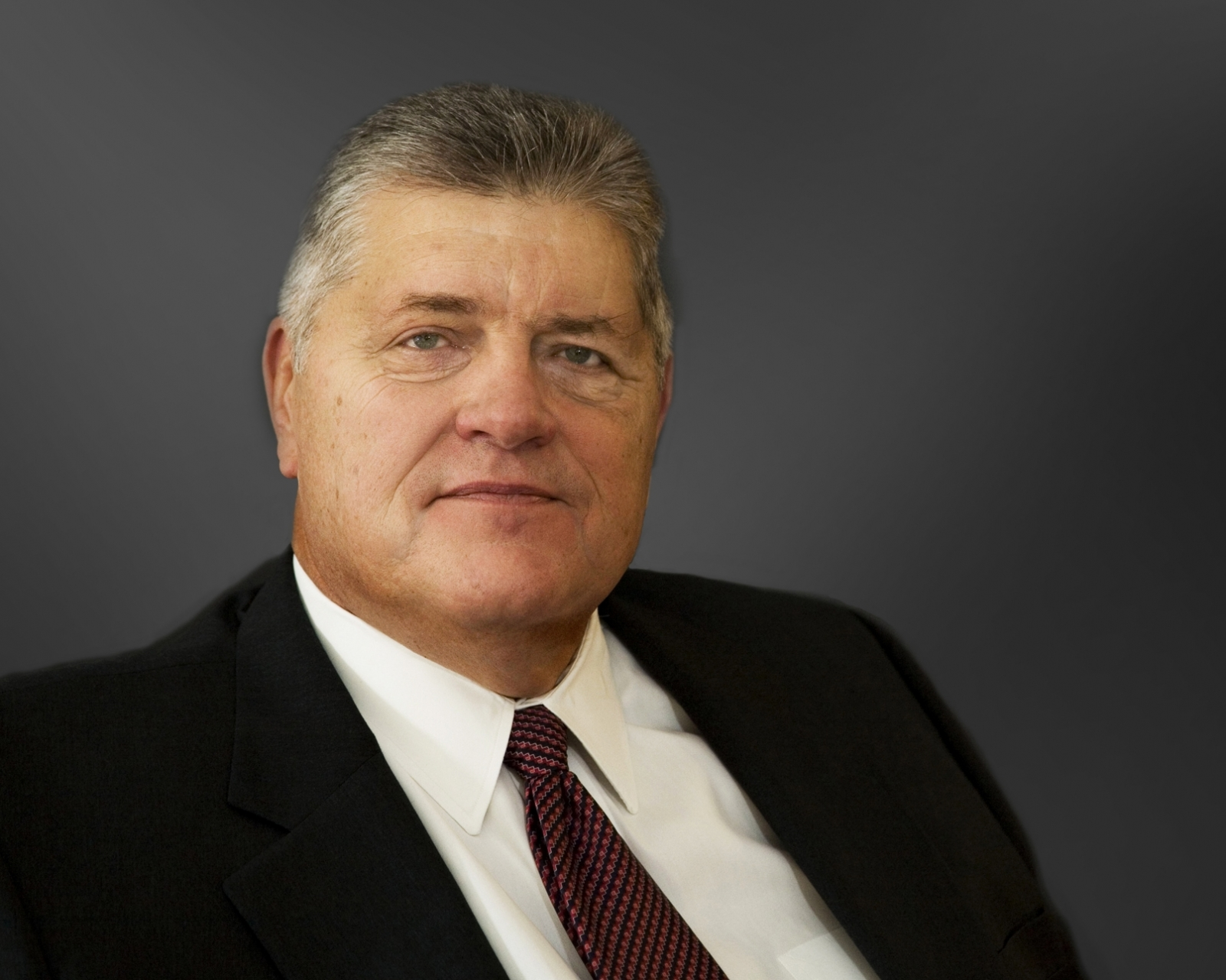
- Nye in 2008

No. 61
- Position: Guard

Personal information
- Born: March 29, 1946 (age 80); Ogden, Utah, U.S.
- Listed height: 6 ft 4 in (1.93 m)
- Listed weight: 251 lb (114 kg)

Career information
- High school: Servite (Anaheim, California)
- College: Stanford (1964-1967)
- NFL draft: 1968: 5th round, 130th overall pick

Career history
- Dallas Cowboys (1968–1976)

Awards and highlights
- Super Bowl champion (VI); First-team All-Pro (1972); 2× Pro Bowl (1974, 1976); First-team All-Pac-8 (1967)

Career NFL statistics
- Games played: 125
- Games started: 96
- Fumble recoveries: 3
- Stats at Pro Football Reference

Blaine Francis Nye (born March 29, 1946) is an American former professional football player who was an offensive lineman for the Dallas Cowboys of the National Football League (NFL). He played college football for the Stanford Cardinal, known then as the Indians.

== Early life ==
Nye was born March 29, 1946, in Ogden, Utah. His father Blaine Sr. was a career United States Marine, who served as a gunnery sergeant at El Toro Marine Air Station in Nye's youth.

Nye played football at Servite High School in Anaheim, California, and graduated in 1964. He was a two-way player on the school's football team for three years. He was a 170 lb (77.1 kg) or 190 lb (86.2 kg) starting tackle as a sophomore in 1961. He was a 210 lb (95.3 kg) tackle as a junior in 1962, and was named first-team All-Angelus League at both offensive tackle and defensive tackle. By his senior year (1963) he was 230 lb (104.3 kg). Servite had an 8–1 record, losing only to the Angelus League champions (Mater Dei). That year he was first-team All-Angelus League at defensive tackle and second team All-Orange County at offensive tackle. He was also lineman of the week five times with Servite. He appeared in the August 1964 Orange County Prep All-Star Game at tackle.

Nye also played center on Servite's basketball team, that won a championship. As a 6 ft 4 in (1.93 m) senior at center, he was named second-team All-Angelus League. He was also an over .300 hitter on the school's baseball team, playing first base.

Nye was an honor student, and graduated as his class valedictorian in 1964, No. 1 in his class. In 1979, Servite honored him with a Blaine Nye Night.

== College career ==
Nye was pursued by the United States Naval Academy and other colleges, but he accepted an academic scholarship from Stanford University, where he would also play football under head coach John Ralston. He was a starting tackle on the freshman team in 1964. As a 235 lb (106.6 kg) sophomore in 1965, Nye began the season at defensive end, but Ralston moved him to offensive tackle as part of an effort to improve the offense. He played at both tackle and end on the offensive line, and played more minutes than any other Stanford sophomore. He had five pass receptions for 67 yards that season. In an October 1965 game against the Oregon Ducks, Nye caught a touchdown pass on a tackle-eligible play (one of two such touchdown plays in that game), helping Stanford upset Oregon to win, 17–14.

As a junior, Ralston originally planned to use Nye at right offensive tackle. He believed Nye had the strength and speed to become a top offensive tackle, while recognizing Nye had the ability to fill in at other positions if necessary; though Ralston preferred him on the offensive line. An early season injury affected Stanford's lineup, and after the Cardinals first game against San Jose State Ralston made Nye Stanford's starting defensive left tackle.

As a junior in 1966, Nye led the team with 104 tackles and received honorable mention All-Pac-8 honors. United Press International (UPI) named him All-Pacific Coast honorable mention at offensive tackle, in 1966. The Athletic Association of Western Universities (AAWU) likewise named him honorable mention All-Conference in 1966, but at defensive tackle. As a junior, he missed two or three games with a leg injury, before rejoining the team at defensive tackle.

As a senior in 1967, UPI named Nye first-team All-Pacific Eight Conference at defensive tackle. The Associated Press (AP) named him an honorable mention All-American. Nye also was honorable mention All-AAWU in 1967. He was named Northern California's top defensive lineman in 1967. In the December 1967 Hula Bowl, Nye was a starting defensive end for the South college all-stars. That same December, he also was a starting defensive tackle in the East West Shrine Game in San Francisco.

Nye earned a Bachelor of Arts degree in physics from Stanford. He also played rugby at Stanford.

== Professional career ==
Nye was selected by the Dallas Cowboys in the fifth round (130th overall) of the 1968 NFL/AFL draft as a defensive tackle. Nye played in 27 games during his first two seasons with the Cowboys (1968 and 1969), but did not start any games. He barely made the team as a rookie guard in 1968. Most of his play was on special teams during those two seasons, playing guard for only a half-dozen plays in two years.

Although Nye had played principally at defensive tackle his last two years at Stanford, in drafting him the Cowboys believed that he lacked the speed and quickness to play on defense. They instead believed he could become an offensive guard in the NFL. Cowboys' offensive line coach Jim Myers said Nye's high intelligence, along with his great strength and balance were the qualities the team saw that led them to this conclusion; and in fact, those qualities later made Nye a successful guard for the Cowboys. Myers also found that the coaches never had to repeat themselves with Nye, he did not make mistakes, and he was highly consistent as a player.

In 1968 and 1969, John Wilbur had been the Cowboys' starting right guard. Wilbur was a 1966 Stanford graduate, and had been Nye’s college teammate. Going into the 1970 season, the Cowboys planned to move 1969 All-Pro Ralph Neely from tackle to guard and move future Hall of Fame tackle Rayfield Wright into Neely's old tackle spot. Originally, Wilbur and 1969 All-Pro guard John Niland were available to play the other guard position, with Tony Liscio to play the other tackle position. Coach Tom Landry traded Wilbur to the Washington Redskins in late August, before the season started, intending to start Wright and Liscio at tackle and Neely and Niland at guard.

Early in the 1970 season, Neely was injured. Landry chose Nye to replace Neely as the Cowboys' starting right guard. Tackle Liscio was subsequently injured, and once Neely recovered he was used at tackle to replace Liscio, with Nye remaining as a starting guard. Nye started 12 games that season, and went on to start every Cowboys' game at right guard from 1971 through 1976, when he retired. In 1970, Nye played between Wright at tackle and center Dave Manders. Nye played next to Wright for the remainder of Nye's career. In 1971, Neely went to left tackle where he was a Cowboys starter until he retired in 1977; and Niland remained the team's starting left guard from 1971 to 1975.

In 1970, the Cowboys led the NFL in total rushing yardage. After winning the first National Football Conference (NFC) championship after the 1970 season, the Cowboys reached Super Bowl V on January 17, 1971, losing to the Baltimore Colts, 16–13. Nye started at right guard in the Super Bowl. The Cowboys reached the Super Bowl again the following season, this time defeating the Miami Dolphins, 24–3. In 1971, they had led the NFL in points scored and total yards. In Super Bowl VI, the Cowboys had 252 rushing yards against the Dolphins, often gained behind the "devastating sweeps" of Nye and Niland; bringing the two guards to national attention.

In 1972, Nye was named to the first-team Newspaper Enterprise Association (NEA) All-Pro team. The 1972 Cowboys went to the NFC championship, losing to the Washington, 26–3; again with Nye at starting right guard. In the 1973 season, the Cowboys once again reached the NFC championship game, losing to the Minnesota Vikings, 27–10. Once more Nye started at right guard. Nye was selected to play in the 1974 Pro Bowl. The following season (1974), the Cowboys missed the playoffs, but still led the NFL in total yards and rushing yards. They reached the Super Bowl again in the 1975 season, losing Super Bowl X to the Pittsburgh Steelers, 21–17; Nye starting in his final Super Bowl appearance.

In 1976, Nye's final season, he was named to the All-NFC team and the Pro Bowl. The January 17, 1977 Pro Bowl game would be his last game in the NFL. Nye announced his retirement on July 23, 1977. He was replaced by Tom Rafferty.

== Legacy and honors ==
During his seven years as a starting guard (1970–1976) Nye helped anchor a dominant offensive line that led the Cowboys to five NFC championship games and three Super Bowls. He played in 125 games during his nine-year career with the Cowboys, starting 96. He played all of his games under future Hall of Fame head coach Tom Landry. Jim Myers was Nye's offensive line coach during his first two seasons, and then Nye's offensive coordinator for the remainder of Nye's career.

Nye was widely considered one of the smartest players in the NFL. Amidst the time and pressure of regular-season play, he earned two master's degrees. Inside the team, he founded the "Zero Club", which prided itself on performing behind the scenes. Its first rule, "Thou Shalt Not Seek Publicity", kept its members (Nye, Larry Cole, and Pat Toomay) out of the limelight. Although he did not seek publicity, he is also known for providing some of the team's famous quotes:

- "Offensive linemen are like salt. Nobody ever remembers the brand they buy".
- After Clint Longley's famous comeback win over the Washington Redskins on Thanksgiving Day in 1974, a reporter asked him what the game meant, his answer was "This game represents the triumph of the uncluttered mind".

Nye was inducted into the Stanford Athletic Hall of Fame, named first-team on the Stanford All-Century Football Team (1991) and inducted into the Orange County Sports Hall of Fame.

== Personal life ==
During the offseasons, Nye earned a M.S. in physics from the University of Washington in Seattle in 1970, and an M.B.A. from Stanford University in 1974. After retiring from football in 1976, he earned a Ph.D. in finance from Stanford in 1981. His dissertation was titled "Demand and Pricing for Health Care and Guaranteed Insurability".

In 1981, Nye founded Stanford Consulting Group, Inc. He performs numerous economic analyses and research, and provides expert testimony in multiple areas including securities litigation, intellectual property, business litigation, damages, and insurance economics.

His son Blaine played college football at the United States Air Force Academy and his son Zachary played college football at Princeton University, both at offensive tackle. Zachary went on to earn a Ph. D., and to work with Nye at the Stanford Consulting Group.
