= Walt Garrison =

American football player (1944–2023)

No. 32
- Positions: Fullback, running back

Personal information
- Born: July 23, 1944; Denton, Texas, U.S.
- Died: October 11, 2023 (aged 79); Weatherford, Texas, U.S.
- Listed height: 6 ft 0 in (1.83 m)
- Listed weight: 205 lb (93 kg)

Career information
- High school: Lewisville (Lewisville, Texas)
- College: Oklahoma State
- NFL draft: 1966: 5th round, 79th overall pick
- AFL draft: 1966: 17th round, 151st overall pick

Career history
- Dallas Cowboys (1966–1974)

Awards and highlights
- Super Bowl champion (VI); Pro Bowl (1972); Dallas Cowboys 25th Anniversary Team; First-team All-Big Eight (1965); Second-team All-Big Eight (1964)

Career NFL statistics
- Games played: 119
- Games started: 72
- Touchdowns: 39
- Total yards: 5,680
- Stats at Pro Football Reference

Walter Benton Garrison (July 23, 1944 – October 11, 2023) was an American professional football player who was a fullback for nine seasons with the Dallas Cowboys of the National Football League (NFL). He played college football for the Oklahoma State Cowboys.

== Early life ==
Born in Denton, Texas, Garrison attended nearby Lewisville High School. He played as a linebacker in football. He also played basketball and baseball.

Garrison accepted a football scholarship from Oklahoma State University, with the intention of playing defense as a linebacker. He started school in the fall of 1962 and played linebacker in the only two games the freshmen team played that year (Arkansas in Stillwater and Oklahoma in Norman).

In the spring of 1963, Phil Cutchin became the new head coach and moved Garrison to running back, even though he hadn't played the position in high school. Although Garrison was a backup player, he finished his sophomore season with 387 rushing yards, only twelve yards behind the team's leader George Thomas, and the tenth highest total in the Big Eight Conference.

As a junior in 1964, he led the Big Eight Conference in rushing with 730 yards, ahead of Jim Grisham and Gale Sayers. He also had 5 rushing touchdowns and 83 receiving yards.

Garrison completed his senior season with 924 rushing yards, 107 receiving yards, and 5 touchdowns. He ranked second in rushing yards in the Big Eight Conference, just 13 yards behind Missouri's Charlie Brown. He carried the ball 19 times for 121 rushing yards against undefeated Nebraska. He rushed for 173 yards against Kansas, and he helped the Cowboys to their first win over Oklahoma in 20 years. His post-season highlights included appearances in the East–West Shrine Game in San Francisco, the Senior Bowl (voted the Outstanding Back of the North team), the Coaches All-America Game in Atlanta and the College All-Star Game against the Green Bay Packers in August 1966.

In 1993, he was inducted into the Oklahoma Sports Hall of Fame. In 2000, he was inducted into the Oklahoma State Athletics Hall of Honor.

== Professional career ==
Garrison was selected by the Dallas Cowboys in the fifth round (79th overall) of the 1966 NFL draft. He was selected by the Kansas City Chiefs in the 17th round (151st overall) of the 1966 AFL draft. In his first two seasons, he was mainly used as a kickoff returner.

In 1968, he tallied 45 carries for 271 yards and 5 touchdowns as a backup player. In 1969, he took over at fullback after the retirement of Don Perkins, posting a career-high 818 rushing yards, while scoring 2 touchdowns and forming one of the league's best running back duos with Calvin Hill.

In 1970, with the arrival of rookie Duane Thomas, he tallied 126 carries for 507 yards and 3 touchdowns. His style of play and perceived ability to play hurt brought him recognition in Cowboys lore, which included playing the NFC Championship Game against the San Francisco 49ers with a cracked collarbone and a serious ankle injury, but still managing to record 17 carries for 71 yards, 3 receptions for 51 yards and one touchdown. It was reported in the media, that the trainers needed 36 yards of tape to get him ready to play in Super Bowl V.

During Dallas' championship season of 1971, he showed his pass-catching skills, leading the team with 40 receptions. That year, the Cowboys rode their three running backs all the way to a Super Bowl VI victory.

In 1972, Garrison was featured on the cover of Sports Illustrated for its pro football preview issue; the photo was from Super Bowl VI in January. During the season, he suffered a 16-stitch cut in one of his fingers while doing his favorite hobby (whittling). He was named to the Pro Bowl, after registering 784 yards and 7 touchdowns, even though he was a part of a three-headed rushing attack. He played in the Pro Bowl a few days after suffering a gash in his face while steer wrestling.

In 1973, he suffered pinched nerves in his neck during training camp and had headaches so severe that he could not sleep. Robert Newhouse was promoted as the starting fullback, performing well enough that it was the sixth game of the season before Garrison could get his starting position back. He still had 105 carries for 440 yards (second on the team) and was third in receiving with 26 receptions. He missed the season finale with a cracked collarbone, but was back in the lineup the next week in the playoffs.

A "real" cowboy, he spent time on the professional rodeo circuit during the football off-seasons. His signing bonus with the Cowboys in 1966 included a horse trailer. Along with Larry Mahan, two time world bull riding champion, Walt was one of only two cowboys to ever complete a ride on the famous rodeo bull named Oscar. In June 1975, Garrison made an appearance at the College National Rodeo Finals in Bozeman, Montana; a knee injury he sustained in an exhibition steer wrestling accident ended his pro football career. He retired in August 1975, and was replaced in the starting lineup with Newhouse.

Garrison played in the NFL for nine seasons (missing only 7 games), all of them with the Cowboys. He finished his career with 3,886 yards rushing and 1,794 yards receiving. Garrison retired as the third leading rusher and fourth-leading receiver in team history.

One of the more humorous sports quotes was attributed to Cowboy quarterback Don Meredith speaking about Garrison's dependability, "If it was third down, and you needed four yards, if you'd get the ball to Walt Garrison, he'd get you five. And if it was third down and you needed twenty yards, if you'd get the ball to Walt Garrison, by God, he'd get you five."

Garrison was named to the Dallas Cowboys' 25th anniversary team and was also inducted into the Texas Cowboy Hall of Fame and the Texas Sports Hall of Fame in 2012.

== NFL career statistics ==
Legend
	Super Bowl champion
**Bold**	Career high

Year	Team	Games		Rushing						Receiving					Fumbles	
Year	Team	GP	GS	Att	Yds	Avg	Y/G	Lng	TD	Rec	Yds	Avg	Lng	TD	Fum	FR
1966	DAL	**14**	0	16	62	3.9	4.4	13	1	2	18	9.0	17	0	–	–
1967	DAL	13	1	24	146	**6.1**	11.2	26	0	2	17	8.5	14	0	–	–
1968	DAL	**14**	0	45	271	6.0	19.4	22	5	7	111	**15.9**	**53**	0	0	1
1969	DAL	13	13	**176**	**818**	4.6	**62.9**	21	2	13	131	10.1	25	0	4	1
1970	DAL	11	10	126	507	4.0	46.1	18	3	21	205	9.8	36	2	2	0
1971	DAL	13	11	127	429	3.4	33.0	34	1	**40**	**396**	9.9	36	1	**6**	0
1972	DAL	**14**	**14**	167	784	4.7	56.0	**41**	**7**	37	390	10.5	26	**3**	**6**	**2**
1973	DAL	13	8	105	440	4.2	33.8	33	6	26	273	10.5	**53**	2	3	1
1974	DAL	**14**	**14**	113	429	3.8	30.6	18	5	34	253	7.4	30	1	5	1
Career		119	71	899	3,886	4.3	32.7	41	30	182	1,794	9.9	53	9	26	6

== Personal life and death ==
Garrison was a long-time spokesman for Skoal smokeless tobacco, and was the television spokesman for Bill Utter Ford near Denton, Texas. In 1988, he published his biography Once a Cowboy with writer John Tullius. The title is a reference not only to his rodeo cowboy career, but also to his career with the Dallas Cowboys and his college career with the Oklahoma State Cowboys.

Garrison served military duty in New Jersey and Fort Lewis. He established the Walt Garrison Multiple Sclerosis Foundation and later resided in Argyle, Texas.

Garrison died in Weatherford, Texas, on October 11, 2023, at the age of 79.
