= Gene Killian =

American football player (born 1952)

No. 60
- Position: Guard

Personal information
- Born: September 22, 1952 (age 74); Tampa, Florida, U.S.
- Listed height: 6 ft 4 in (1.93 m)
- Listed weight: 250 lb (113 kg)

Career information
- High school: Brandon (FL)
- College: Tennessee
- NFL draft: 1974: 16th round, 413th overall pick

Career history
- Dallas Cowboys (1974); San Diego Chargers (1975)*; New Orleans Saints (1976)*
- * Offseason or practice squad member only

Career NFL statistics
- Games played: 7
- Stats at Pro Football Reference

Lowell Eugene Killian (born September 22, 1952) is an American former professional football player who was an offensive guard for the Dallas Cowboys of the National Football League (NFL). He played college football for the Tennessee Volunteers.

== Early life ==
Killian attended Brandon High School, where he practiced football and track.

He accepted a football scholarship from the University of Tennessee. As a junior, he was named a starter at offensive tackle.

As a senior, he was the starter at left tackle, before being lost for the season with a knee injury he suffered in the fourth game against the University of Kansas. He was replaced with Paul Johnson who was moved from center.

In track, he competed in the shot put.

== Professional career ==
=== Dallas Cowboys ===
Killian was selected by the Dallas Cowboys in the 16th round (413th overall) of the 1974 NFL draft. He was a backup offensive guard. He was considered to be a very good athlete, in the season finale against the Oakland Raiders, he tackled linebacker Phil Villapiano from behind, after he returned a Cowboys fumble 27 yards. He was waived on August 13, 1975.

=== San Diego Chargers ===
On August 13, 1975, Killian was claimed off waivers by the San Diego Chargers. On August 19, he was released after failing his physical examination.

=== New Orleans Saints ===
In 1976, Killian was signed as a free agent by the New Orleans Saints. He was released on September 7.
