= John Niland (American football) =

American football player (1944–2026)

No. 76, 74
- Position: Guard

Personal information
- Born: February 29, 1944; Quincy, Massachusetts, U.S.
- Died: August 15, 2026 (aged 82); McKinney, Texas, U.S.
- Listed height: 6 ft 3 in (1.91 m)
- Listed weight: 245 lb (111 kg)

Career information
- High school: Amityville (Amityville, New York)
- College: Iowa (1962–1965)
- NFL draft: 1966: 1st round, 5th overall pick
- AFL draft: 1966: 13th round, 116th overall pick

Career history
- Dallas Cowboys (1966–1974); Philadelphia Eagles (1975–1976)

Awards and highlights
- Super Bowl champion (VI); 3× First-team All-Pro (1969, 1971, 1972); 6× Pro Bowl (1968–1973); First-team All-American (1965); Second-team All-American (1964); First-team All-Big Ten (1965); Second-team All-Big Ten (1964)

Career NFL statistics
- Games played: 138
- Games started: 124
- Fumble recoveries: 5
- Stats at Pro Football Reference

John Hugh Niland (February 29, 1944 – August 15, 2026) was an American professional football player who was an offensive guard in the National Football League (NFL) for the Dallas Cowboys and Philadelphia Eagles. He was a six-time Pro Bowler and a three-time All-Pro. He played college football for the Iowa Hawkeyes, and was a two-time All-American.

In 2021, the Professional Football Researchers Association named Niland to the PFRA Hall of Very Good Class of 2021.

== Early life ==
Niland was born in Quincy, Massachusetts, on February 29, 1944. He was placed for adoption when he was two years old. Niland was raised by his adopted family in Amityville, Suffolk County, Long Island, living in the black community (although the family was white). His father was an unemployed alcoholic, his mother made minimum wage, and he began working at age nine for 50 cents and pizza. He went through a period of stealing hub caps for extra money. Niland found out he was adopted when applying for a drivers license at 16 years old.

He attended Amityville Memorial High School, where he was an All-State fullback as a senior. He graduated in 1962. During his playing days with the Cowboys, Niland would send money to the school to serve as annual scholarship fund to help two student athletes financially toward attending college.

== College career ==
Niland accepted a football scholarship from the University of Iowa. He began his college career as a fullback, before being converted into an offensive tackle and becoming a starter at right tackle as a sophomore. Niland was moved to offensive guard as a junior.

He was a first-team All-American selection his senior year (1965), as well as being selected All-Big 10. He was a second-team All-American selection in 1964 by the Newspaper Enterprise Association, and second-team All-Big 10 that year as well. After his senior year, Niland played in the East West Shrine Game, the Hula Bowl, and the Chicago College All-Star Game, where he was unsuccessful in blocking against Green Bay Packer Hall of Fame defensive tackle Henry Jordan. Niland won these honors and all-star recognition, even though his Iowa teams had losing records of 3–6 in 1964, and 1–9 in 1965.

== Professional career ==
=== Dallas Cowboys ===
Niland was selected in the first round (fifth overall) of the 1966 NFL draft by the Dallas Cowboys, becoming the first offensive lineman in franchise history to be drafted in the first round. He was also selected by the Oakland Raiders in the thirteenth round (116th overall) of the 1966 AFL draft. Niland started four games at left guard in 1966, and was the Cowboys' full time starter at left guard from 1967 to 1974. One of the top offensive linemen of his era, Niland excelled as a pulling guard.

During Niland's rookie season, Jim Boeke was the starting left offensive tackle and Tony Liscio the starting left guard. Boeke was injured during the Cowboys' seventh game of the season against the Cleveland Browns. Cowboys' coach Tom Landry then moved Liscio to Boeke's starting left tackle position, and put Niland in at starting left guard the following week against the Pittsburgh Steelers. Niland started the next three weeks at left guard, with Liscio at left tackle. Boeke returned as the starting left tackle in the Cowboys' 11th game of the season, and Liscio moved back to starting left tackle.

The 1966 Cowboys were first in the NFL East Division with a 10–3–1 record, and played the Green Bay Packers in the 1966 NFL Championship Game. Contemporaneous reporting says Boeke played left tackle in that January 1, 1967 NFL Championship Game, and Liscio started at left guard; not Niland. Boeke committed an offsides penalty that was a significant factor in the game's outcome. The Associated Press (AP) named Liscio a second-team NFL All-Star at guard that season; and just days before the NFL championship game, Landry singled out Liscio and Dan Reeves as the two new players who made a substantial positive impact on the Cowboys' offense in 1966.

During the 1967 preseason, Landry decided to start Niland at left guard and moved Tony Liscio to left tackle, with Boeke now playing a reserve role. In 1967, Niland started 13 games at left guard and Liscio 14 games at left tackle. Niland started in the 1967 NFL Championship Game, famously known as the "Ice Bowl". In the 1967 NFL championship game, Niland played left guard next to Liscio, and opposite the Packers' right defensive end Lionel Aldridge and right defensive tackle Jordan (whom Niland had faced only two years earlier in the Chicago All-Star game).

In 1968, Niland started all 14 games at left guard and was selected to play in the Pro Bowl. He started all 14 games again in 1969. Niland was named first-team All-Pro by the Associated Press and Pro Football Weekly, and second-team All-Pro by United Press International (UPI) and the Newspaper Enterprise Association (NEA). He was again chosen to play in the Pro Bowl. The Cowboys were 12–2 in 1968, and led the NFL in total yards and passing yards, and were second in rushing yards. They were 11–2–1 in 1969, again leading the NFL in total yards and leading the NFL in rushing yards.

Niland started 12 games in 1970, and went to the Pro Bowl for a third consecutive season. The Cowboys won the NFC Championship Game during the 1970-71 NFL playoffs against the San Francisco 49ers, due in large part to Duane Thomas's 143 yards on the ground, but lost in Super Bowl V to the Baltimore Colts. The Cowboys again led the now merged NFL in rushing in 1970.

In 1971, Niland was named to the Pro Bowl again, and was named first-team All-Pro by the Associated Press, Pro Football Weekly, and the Pro Football Writers of America. The Cowboys were first in the NFL in total yards on offense, second in passing yards, and third in rushing yards. They again defeated the San Francisco 49ers in the NFC Championship Game of the 1971-72 NFL playoffs, and then beat the Miami Dolphins in Super Bowl VI. In Super Bowl VI, Niland and Liscio overwhelmed Miami's Bob Heinz and Bill Stanfill, respectively, leading Duane Thomas and others to a decisively high 252 yards on the ground. The Cowboys used a slip-wedge blocking scheme to neutralize Miami middle linebacker Nick Buoniconti, based on Vince Lombardi's offense from the Packers championship days, chiefly executed to success by Niland and Cowboys center Dave Manders.

In 1972, the Associated Press and Pro Football Weekly again named Niland a first-team All-Pro, and the NEA and Pro Football Writers named him second-team All-Pro. He was selected to the Pro Bowl for a fifth consecutive season. The Cowboys were 10–4 that season, losing the NFC Championship game, 26–3. He was selected to play in the Pro Bowl for a sixth consecutive season the following year, and was named first-team All-NFC by the Associated Press, UPI, and The Sporting News. The Cowboys again reached the NFC Championship game, losing 27–10.

=== Philadelphia Eagles ===
On September 14, 1975, he was traded to the Philadelphia Eagles in exchange for a third round draft choice (No. 62-Tony Hill).

In 1975, he started 13 games at left guard after missing the season opener with a hamstring injury. The next year, he tore ligaments in his left knee during a training camp practice and was placed on the injured reserve list.

== Personal life and death ==
Niland served military duty at Fort Hood.

While still playing for the Cowboys, Niland was: involved with a land-development company, a bank vice president, a television and radio personality, a spokesman for Pepsi Cola, and a regular banquet speaker. His offseason income came to equal the salary paid by the Cowboys.

He served 11 months in federal prison camp in 1988–1989 after being found guilty of submitting a false financial statement to obtain a loan. He had been introduced to cocaine and a fast lifestyle in 1972, and the use of amphetamines was regularly around him. Just a year earlier (1971), he spoke in a New York Times interview on the benefits of training rules and behavioral restrictions on players; even stating that any teenage boy's interest being directed towards sports could help in leading them away from drug use. Added to the pressure to perform at a high level for the Cowboys, his personal and financial life diverted in a negative direction, and by the 1980s Niland faced indictments on criminal charges and filed for bankruptcy.

After his release, Niland put that life behind him, and focused on his Christian faith. He worked as vice president of sales for the Arrow Magnolia Chemical Company. He later worked for a concrete company.

Niland died in McKinney, Texas, on August 15, 2026, at the age of 82. His family expressed their intention to donate Niland's brain to the Boston University CTE Center for study.

== Legacy and honors ==
Niland is a member of the Cowboys All-Time Team. In 1989, Niland was named to the Iowa Hawkeyes All-Time Football Team. In 2006, he was inducted into the University of Iowa Athletics Hall of Fame. In 1997, Niland was inducted into the Suffolk Sports Hall of Fame on Long Island in the football category.

Along with Rayfield Wright, Nate Newton, Larry Allen, Tyron Smith and Zack Martin, Niland is one of only six offensive linemen in team history with at least six Pro Bowl selections. He was selected to six consecutive Pro Bowls from 1968 to 1973 and was a three-time All-Pro selection, while only missing two games in his nine seasons with the Cowboys.

Niland believed that practicing against All-Pro and future Hall of Fame Cowboys defensive tackle Bob Lilly, beginning in his rookie year, helped Niland become a Pro Bowler and solidified an offensive line that won two NFC Championship Games and one Super Bowl. Learning to block against Lilly made Niland more confident in his own blocking ability. Lilly also taught Niland how to watch his opponents' foot and leg movements; and educated Niland on how to handle the minor and major aspects of the physical beating linemen take in games.

He was nicknamed Johnny Nightlife by his Cowboys teammates, because of his thirst for the nightlife, something that would undermine him later in life.
