= Calvin Hill =

American football player (born 1947)

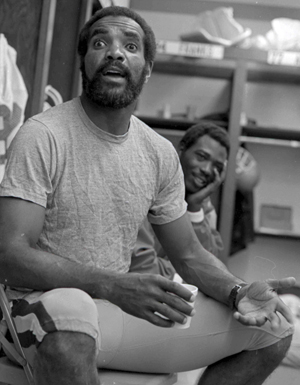
- Hill with the Cleveland Browns in 1979

No. 35
- Position: Running back

Personal information
- Born: January 2, 1947 (age 79); Baltimore, Maryland, U.S.
- Listed height: 6 ft 4 in (1.93 m)
- Listed weight: 227 lb (103 kg)

Career information
- High school: Riverdale Country (The Bronx, New York)
- College: Yale (1965–1968)
- NFL draft: 1969: 1st round, 24th overall pick

Career history
- Dallas Cowboys (1969–1974); The Hawaiians (1975); Washington Redskins (1976–1977); Cleveland Browns (1978–1981)

Awards and highlights
- Super Bowl champion (VI); NFL Offensive Rookie of the Year (1969); 2× First-team All-Pro (1969, 1973); 2× Second-team All-Pro (1969, 1973); 4× Pro Bowl (1969, 1972–1974); NFL All-Rookie Team (1969); 2× First-team All-East (1967, 1968); 2× All-Ivy League (1967, 1968)

Career NFL statistics
- Rushing yards: 6,083
- Rushing average: 4.2
- Receptions: 271
- Receiving yards: 2,861
- Total touchdowns: 65
- Stats at Pro Football Reference

Calvin G. Hill (born January 2, 1947) is an American former professional football player who was a running back in the National Football League (NFL). He played for the Dallas Cowboys, Washington Redskins, and Cleveland Browns. He also played a season with The Hawaiians of the World Football League (WFL).

Hill was named to the Pro Bowl four times (1969, 1972, 1973, and 1974). In 1972, he became the first Cowboy running back to have a 1,000-yard rushing season (with 1,036 yards rushing); he repeated the feat in the following season with 1,142 yards rushing.

Yale University conferred Hill with an honorary Doctor of Humane Letters degree at its 2016 commencement. "You are a Yale legend" is the opening sentence of the citation honoring Hill.

== Early life ==
Hill was born on January 2, 1947, in Baltimore, Maryland. He was awarded a scholarship to attend the Riverdale Country School in The Bronx, New York before attending ninth grade. At Riverdale, he was an accomplished athlete in football, basketball, baseball, and track and field, often leading teams that defeated athletic arch-rival Horace Mann School and other Ivy Preparatory School League opponents in the metropolitan New York City-area.

He was introduced to organized football at Riverdale, where he was named the starting quarterback as a sophomore. From 1963 to 1965 he ran the T formation in a program that was undefeated for eight seasons, 1958 through 1965, and was led by head coach Frank Bertino.

Hill was also an honors student at the secondary school.

== College career ==
Hill acknowledged a desire to play in a stadium with a large seating capacity, and was impressed by the large crowd, more than 70,000, watching Yale defeat Dartmouth 24–15 at the Yale Bowl during a visit, October 31, 1964.

The second day of practices at Yale, the coaching staff shifted Hill to linebacker on the freshman team and gave the quarterback job to Brian Dowling. After four days at linebacker he was moved to halfback where he remained.

Hill and Dowling had incomparable on-field chemistry. Dowling could pass, and Hill could run, and both could catch passes. Hill, who threw six halfback option passes for touchdowns at Yale, likened Dowling's athletic virtuosity to John Coltrane's musicality.

Hill and Dowling led the 1968 Yale team to an undefeated season, ending its schedule in a famed 29-29 tie at Harvard. During his three years as a starter, the Bulldogs posted records respectively of 4–5, 8-1 and 8–0–1. Hill also played tight end or linebacker in some games.

Hill was a subject, along with Dowling, of Garry Trudeau's "Bull Tales" cartoons in the Yale Daily News. "Bull Tales" was the forerunner of the Pulitzer Prize winning Doonesbury.

Hill was a sprinter and jumper for the Yale track team. He holds the school record for the outdoor triple jump. He was the 1967 and 1968 long jump and triple jump Ivy League Heptagonal Outdoor Track & Field Champion.

Hill completed his three-year varsity collegiate athletic career with 2527 all-purpose yards, 1,512 rushing yards from the line of scrimmage, 858 receiving yards, and 298 passing yards. Hill graduated with the Yale College Class of 1969. At Yale, he joined Delta Kappa Epsilon fraternity. and St. Elmo Society.

== Professional career ==
=== Dallas Cowboys ===
Hill was selected by the Dallas Cowboys in the first round (24th overall) of the 1969 NFL draft. At the time this selection was widely questioned, because teams did not think they could find professional players at elite colleges.

The Cowboys drafted him as an athlete, so he spent his first few days in training camp as a linebacker and tight end. He got his chance at playing halfback in the second exhibition game, because the team was experiencing problems at running back during that training camp. Don Perkins, the fourth leading rusher in NFL history had just formally announced his retirement, Dan Reeves the starter at halfback was struggling after having off-season knee surgery and his backup Craig Baynham had bruised ribs. Hill never relinquished the starting job and when the regular season started, even though he was a rookie, he became a dominant player in the league. Through the first nine games of the season, he was the best running back in the NFL with 807 rushing yards. However, he hurt his toe while rushing for a team record 150 yards in a 41–28 victory over the Washington Redskins in the ninth game of the season. The team didn't know the extent of the injury, so he missed the next 2 games. When it was later revealed that it was broken, Hill played the last 2 games with a broken toe that required an injection before every practice and game.

Hill finished his rookie season with 942 rushing yards (4.6 yard average) and 8 touchdowns. He also received NFL Offensive Rookie of the Year, All-Pro and Pro Bowl honors.

The Cowboys selected Duane Thomas in the first round of the 1970 NFL draft, because the team was not confident that Hill had recovered during the off season. He also had complications from an infected blister in the same foot that kept him in the hospital for more than a month. Nine games into the 1970 season, he suffered a back injury and didn't play much the rest of the year, finishing with 577 rushing yards while averaging 3.8 yards per carry.

In 1971, he suffered a torn anterior cruciate ligament against the New York Giants, that was initially diagnosed as a sprained knee. He missed six games and tried to play again in the NFC Championship, but hurt his knee again scoring a touchdown.

In 1972, after the Cowboys traded Thomas to the San Diego Chargers, Hill became the first running back in franchise history to surpass the 1,000 yard mark and proved he could still run the football. He finished with 1,045 yards and a 4.2 yard average and six touchdowns. He also set a club record for receptions by a running back with 43. In 1973, he broke his own team record with 1,142 yards and six touchdowns.

Hill played in Dallas for six seasons, helping the Cowboys win Super Bowl VI and 2 NFC titles. He had some superb years with the team, making four Pro Bowls (1969, 1972, 1973, 1974) and two All-Pro teams (1969, 1973).

=== The Hawaiians ===
In March 1974, he was selected by The Hawaiians in the second round (14th overall) of the WFL Pro Draft. On April 9, Hill signed a contract with The Hawaiians of the World Football League, but played in Dallas in 1974. He played in three WFL games in 1975, carrying the ball 49 times for 218 yards and no touchdowns, before suffering a torn medial collateral ligament in his right knee. When the league folded, he returned to the NFL.

=== Washington Redskins ===
On April 3, 1976, Hill signed as a free agent with the Washington Redskins, but he could not recapture his previous playing level. In two seasons as a backup running back, he rushed for 558 yards and caught 25 passes, before announcing his retirement on August 7, 1978.

=== Cleveland Browns ===
The Cleveland Browns convinced him to unretire and signed him to a contract on September 25, 1978. He played four seasons mostly as a third-down running back, before retiring at the end of the 1981 season.

Hill played in the NFL for 12 seasons, recording 6,083 rushing yards, 42 rushing touchdowns, 2,861 receiving yards and 23 receiving touchdowns.

== NFL career statistics ==
Legend
	Super Bowl champion
**Bold**	Career high

Year	Team	Games		Rushing						Receiving					Fumbles	
Year	Team	GP	GS	Att	Yds	Avg	Y/G	Lng	TD	Rec	Yds	Avg	Lng	TD	Fum	FR
1969	DAL	13	13	204	942	4.6	72.5	**55**	**8**	20	232	11.6	28	0	**7**	2
1970	DAL	12	9	153	577	3.8	48.1	20	4	13	95	7.3	21	0	4	0
1971	DAL	8	7	106	468	4.4	58.5	17	**8**	19	244	12.8	27	3	2	0
1972	DAL	14	**14**	245	1,036	4.2	74.0	26	6	**43**	364	8.5	33	3	**7**	0
1973	DAL	14	**14**	**273**	**1,142**	4.2	**81.6**	21	6	32	290	9.1	29	0	**7**	**3**
1974	DAL	12	12	185	844	4.6	70.3	27	7	12	134	11.2	39	0	5	0
1976	WAS	14	2	79	301	3.8	21.5	15	1	7	100	**14.3**	23	0	4	0
1977	WAS	14	1	69	257	3.7	18.4	34	0	18	154	8.6	23	1	3	1
1978	CLE	12	1	80	289	3.6	24.1	21	1	25	334	13.4	**53**	**6**	2	0
1979	CLE	14	7	53	193	3.6	13.8	33	1	38	381	10.0	31	2	1	0
1980	CLE	**15**	0	1	11	**11.0**	11.0	11	0	27	**383**	14.2	50	**6**	–	–
1981	CLE	14	0	4	23	5.8	1.6	9	0	17	150	8.8	23	2	1	0
Career		156	80	1,452	6,083	4.2	39.0	55	42	271	2,861	10.6	53	23	43	6

== Personal life ==
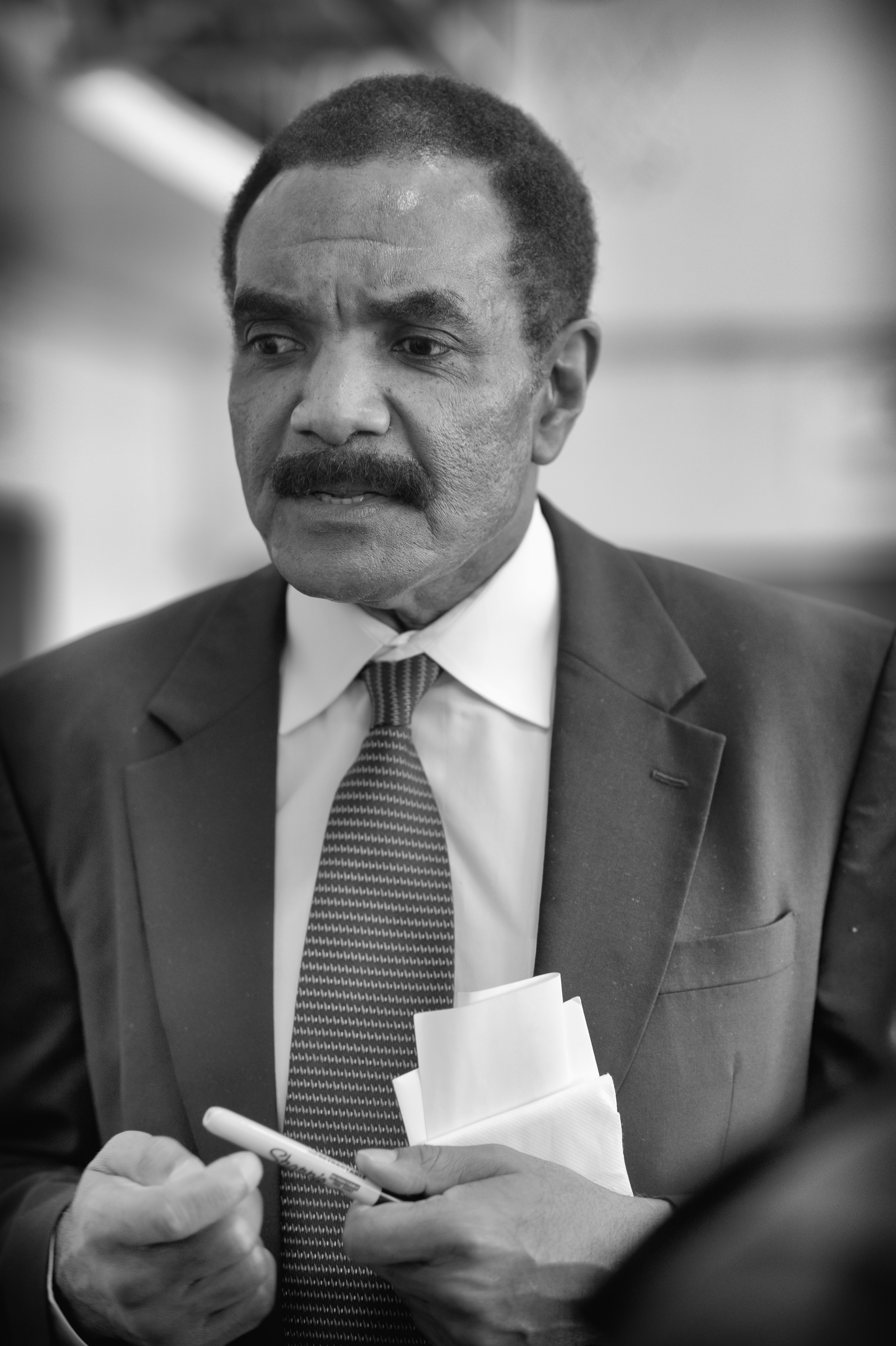
Hill in 2014, speaking to students at the Riverdale Country School

Hill's wife, Janet, was a graduate of Wellesley College, where she was friends with Hillary Rodham Clinton. They are the parents of retired NBA player Grant Hill. Hill was the 1969 NFL Rookie of the Year. Twenty six years later, his son, Grant, shared the 1995 NBA Rookie of the Year award with Jason Kidd.

In 1987, Baltimore Orioles owner Edward Bennett Williams appointed Hill to the team's board of directors. The following year, he was named vice president for personnel and served in that capacity until 1994.

Hill currently sits on the boards of several organizations, works as a corporate motivational speaker, and works for the Dallas Cowboys organization as a consultant who specializes in working with troubled players. Additionally, Hill is a consultant to the Cleveland Browns Football Club and Alexander & Associates, Inc., a Washington, D.C. corporate consulting firm. As a consultant with the Cleveland Browns, he helped form a group of Cleveland Browns' players to control and eliminate drug and alcohol-related problems. Hill has written several articles on sports and academia for national publications, makes appearances at university campuses and business firms, throughout the United States. He addresses several topics including the problem of drugs and alcohol and the work needed in this area, and the important relationship of sports and academia.

The Calvin Hill Day Care Center in New Haven was founded by fellow Baltimore, Maryland-native Kurt Schmoke among other undergraduates in 1970 and is named in his honor. It is available to Yale University families from all economic levels.

On May 23, 2016, Hill received an honorary doctorate from Yale University.
