= Super Bowl VI =

1972 Edition of the Super Bowl

Dallas Cowboys (NFC) (11–3)	Miami Dolphins (AFC) (10–3–1)
24	3
Head coach: Tom Landry	Head coach: Don Shula
	1	2	3	4	Total
DAL	3	7	7	7	24
MIA	0	3	0	0	3
- Date: January 16, 1972
- Kickoff time: 1:35 p.m. CST (UTC-6)
- Stadium: Tulane Stadium; New Orleans, Louisiana
- MVP: Roger Staubach, quarterback
- Favorite: Cowboys by 6
- Referee: Jim Tunney
- Attendance: 81,023

Ceremonies
- National anthem: U.S. Air Force Academy Chorale
- Coin toss: Jim Tunney
- Halftime show: "Salute to Louis Armstrong" with Ella Fitzgerald, Carol Channing, Al Hirt and the U.S. Marine Corps Drill Team

TV in the United States
- Network: CBS
- Announcers: Ray Scott and Pat Summerall
- Nielsen ratings: 44.2 (est. 56.64 million viewers)
- Market share: 74
- Cost of 30-second commercial: $86,100

Radio in the United States
- Network: CBS Radio
- Announcers: Andy Musser and Ray Geracy

Super Bowl VI was an American football game between the National Football Conference (NFC) champion Dallas Cowboys and the American Football Conference (AFC) champion Miami Dolphins to decide the National Football League (NFL) champion for the 1971 season. The Cowboys defeated the Dolphins by the score of 24–3, to win their first Super Bowl. This was the first major professional sports championship ever won by a Dallas-based team. The game was played on January 16, 1972, at Tulane Stadium in New Orleans, Louisiana, the second time the Super Bowl was played in that city. Despite the southerly location, it was unseasonably cold at the time, with the kickoff air temperature of 39 °F (4 °C) making this the coldest Super Bowl played.

Dallas, in its second Super Bowl appearance, entered the game with a reputation of not being able to win big playoff games such as Super Bowl V and the 1966 and 1967 NFL Championship Games prior to the 1970 AFL–NFL merger. They posted an 11–3 record during the 1971 regular season before defeating the Minnesota Vikings and the San Francisco 49ers in the playoffs. The Dolphins were making their first Super Bowl appearance after building a 10–3–1 regular season record, including eight consecutive wins, and posting postseason victories over the Kansas City Chiefs and the Baltimore Colts.

The Cowboys dominated Super Bowl VI, setting Super Bowl records for the most rushing yards (252), the most first downs (23), and the fewest points allowed (3). They were also the first NFL or NFC team to win the Super Bowl since the Green Bay Packers in Super Bowl II. For the next 47 years, they would be the only team to prevent their opponent from scoring a touchdown in the Super Bowl, a feat matched by the 2018 New England Patriots in Super Bowl LIII and again by the 2020 Tampa Bay Buccaneers in Super Bowl LV. The game was close in the first half, with the Cowboys only leading 10–3 at halftime. But Dallas opened the third quarter with a 71-yard, 8-play touchdown drive, and then Dallas linebacker Chuck Howley's 41-yard interception return in the fourth quarter set up another score. This was the first Super Bowl where the winning team outscored the losing team in all four quarters. Cowboys quarterback Roger Staubach, who completed 12 out of 18 passes for 119 yards, threw 2 touchdown passes, and rushed 5 times for 18 yards, was named the Super Bowl's Most Valuable Player.

This was the last Super Bowl to be blacked out in the TV market in which the game was played. Under the NFL's unconditional blackout rules at the time, the Super Bowl could not be broadcast locally even if the local team did not advance to the Super Bowl, and it was a sellout. The following year, the league changed its rules to allow games to be broadcast in the local market if sold out 72 hours in advance. It was the last Super Bowl played with the hashmarks (also called the inbound lines) set at 40 feet apart (20 yards from the sidelines), and the last NFL game overall; the next season, they were brought in to 18 1/2 feet, the width of the goalposts, where they remain.

== Background ==
=== Host selection process ===
The NFL awarded Super Bowl VI to New Orleans on March 23, 1971, at the owners' meetings held in Palm Beach, Florida. Six cities submitted bids: Miami, Dallas, Jacksonville, New Orleans, Los Angeles, and Houston. It took fourteen ballots to finally select a winner. Miami and Dallas emerged as the heavy favorites. After thirteen deadlocked votes, support for both Dallas and Miami eroded after owners including Al Davis and Billy Sullivan noted that the Cowboys and Dolphins both were both favorites to reach the Super Bowl. They argued against a team having a potential competitive advantage of a home game for the Super Bowl. Owners compromised on the 14th vote and selected New Orleans. City representatives, namely those from Miami, argued that future votes involve awarding multiple Super Bowl sites at the same meeting. They also floated the idea of rotating the host city between AFC and NFC cities annually. This would provide the hosts with greater preparation time and prevent them from having to prepare bids every year. The idea to vote on multiple Super Bowls was implemented the following year, but the AFC/NFC rotation was never implemented.

=== Dallas Cowboys ===
The Cowboys entered the season still having the reputation of "not being able to win the big games" and "next year's champion". The Super Bowl V loss added more fuel to that widely held view. As in the previous season, Dallas had a quarterback controversy as Staubach and Craig Morton alternated as starting quarterback (in a loss to the Bears in game 7, Morton and Staubach alternated plays). The Cowboys were 4–3 at the season midpoint, including a 24–14 loss to the New Orleans Saints at Tulane Stadium. But after head coach Tom Landry settled on Staubach, the Cowboys won their last seven regular season games to finish with an 11–3 record.

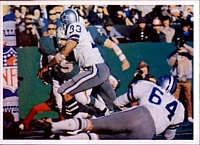
Dallas running back Duane Thomas rushing for a 3rd quarter touchdown in Super Bowl VI.

Staubach finished the regular season as the NFL's top rated passer (101.8) by throwing for 1,882 yards, 15 touchdowns, and only 4 interceptions. He was also a terrific rusher, gaining 343 yards and 2 touchdowns on 41 carries. Dallas also had an outstanding trio of running backs, Walt Garrison, Duane Thomas, and Calvin Hill, who rushed for a combined total of 1,690 yards and 14 touchdowns during the season. Garrison led the team in receptions during the season (40). (Thomas, upset that the Cowboys would not renegotiate his contract after his excellent rookie year, had stopped talking to the press and to almost everyone on the team). Wide Receivers Bob Hayes and Lance Alworth also provided a deep threat, catching a combined total of 69 passes for 1,327 yards and 10 touchdowns. The offensive line, anchored by all-pro tackle Rayfield Wright, Pro Bowlers John Niland and Ralph Neely, and future Hall of Famer Forrest Gregg, was also a primary reason for their success on offense. Neely had broken his leg in November in a dirt-bike accident, and was replaced first by Gregg and then by Tony Liscio, who came out of retirement.

The Dallas defense (nicknamed the "Doomsday Defense") had given up only one touchdown in the last 14 quarters prior to the Super Bowl. Their defensive line was anchored by Pro Bowl defensive tackle Bob Lilly, who excelled at pressuring quarterbacks and breaking up running plays. Dallas also had an outstanding trio of linebackers: Pro Bowler Chuck Howley, who recorded 5 interceptions and returned them for 122 yards; Dave Edwards 2 interceptions; and Lee Roy Jordan, who recorded 2 interceptions. The Cowboys secondary was led by 2 future Hall of Fame cornerbacks Herb Adderley (6 interceptions for 182 return yards) and Mel Renfro (4 interceptions for 11 yards). Safeties Cliff Harris and Pro Bowler Cornell Green combined for 4 interceptions. Harris added 29 kickoff returns for 823 yards, an average of 28.4 yards per return (3rd in the NFL). They were also helped out by weak side linebacker D.D. Lewis.

=== Miami Dolphins ===
The Dolphins, who advanced to the Super Bowl just five years after their founding in 1966, were based primarily around their league-leading running attack, led by running backs Larry Csonka and Jim Kiick. Csonka rushed for 1,051 yards, averaging over five yards per carry, and scored seven touchdowns. Versatile Jim Kiick rushed for 738 yards and three touchdowns, and was second on the Dolphins in receiving with 40 receptions for 338 yards. They fumbled once (by Kiick) between the two of them during the regular season. But Miami also had a threatening passing game. Quarterback Bob Griese, the AFC's leading passer and most valuable player, put up an impressive performance during the season, completing 145 passes for 2,089 yards and 19 touchdowns with only 9 interceptions. Griese's major weapon was wide receiver Paul Warfield, who caught 43 passes for 996 yards (a 23.2 yards per catch average) and a league-leading 11 touchdowns. The Dolphins also had an excellent offensive line to open up holes for their running backs and protect Griese on pass plays, led by future Hall of Fame guard Larry Little.

Miami's defense was a major reason why the team built a 10–3–1 regular season record, including eight consecutive wins. Future Hall of Fame linebacker Nick Buoniconti was a major force reading and stopping plays, while safety Jake Scott recorded 7 interceptions and led the NFL in punt return yards with 318.

=== Playoffs ===
Before this season, the Dolphins had never won a playoff game in franchise history, but they surprised the entire NFL by advancing to the Super Bowl with wins against the two previous Super Bowl champions. The Dolphins became the first of the four teams which had commenced play in the NFL or AFL after the start of the Super Bowl era to contest so much as a title game, (Note: Title game in this context refers to an NFL/AFL Championship Game prior to the NFL-AFL merger and an NFC/AFC Championship Game after the merger.) let alone earn a berth in the world championship game.

First Miami defeated the Kansas City Chiefs (winners of Super Bowl IV), 27–24, in the longest game in NFL history with kicker Garo Yepremian's game-winning field goal after 22 minutes and 40 seconds of overtime play in the final Chiefs game at Municipal Stadium. Later, Miami shut out the defending Super Bowl champion Baltimore Colts, 21–0, in the AFC Championship Game, with safety Dick Anderson intercepting 3 passes from Colts quarterback Johnny Unitas and returning one of them for a 62-yard touchdown.

Meanwhile, the Cowboys marched to the Super Bowl with playoff wins over the Minnesota Vikings, 20–12 in the NFC Divisional Playoffs, and the San Francisco 49ers, 14–3 in the NFC Championship Game, giving up only one touchdown in the two games.

=== Super Bowl pregame news and notes ===
Soon after the Dolphins' win in the AFC Championship Game, Shula received a phone call at his home from President Richard Nixon at 1:30 in the morning. Nixon had a play he thought would work, a particular pass to Warfield. (That particular play, which was called late in the first quarter, was broken up by Mel Renfro.)

When asked about the Dolphins' defensive team prior to Super Bowl VI, Landry said that he could not recall any of the players' names, but they were a big concern to him. Over the years this remark has been regarded as the origin of the nickname "No-Name Defense". However, it was Miami defensive coordinator Bill Arnsparger who had originally given his squad the nickname after the Dolphins had beaten the Baltimore Colts in the AFC Championship.

According to Tom Landry, the Cowboys were very confident. "When they talked among themselves they said there was no way they were going to lose that game."

The Cowboys used the New Orleans Saints' practice facility in Metairie as its training headquarters for the game. The Dolphins split their practices between Tulane Stadium and Tad Gormley Stadium in New Orleans' City Park. Dallas' team hotel was the Hilton across from New Orleans International Airport in Kenner, and Miami lodged at the Fontainebleau Motor Hotel in New Orleans' Mid-City neighborhood.

On Media Day, Duane Thomas refused to answer any questions and sat silently until his required time was up. Roger Staubach surmises that Duane Thomas would have been named MVP if he had cooperated with the press prior to the game. In the Cowboys' locker room after the game, flustered CBS reporter Tom Brookshier asked Duane Thomas a long-winded question, the gist of which was "You're fast, aren't you?" Thomas, who had shunned the press all season, simply said "Evidently." Thomas became the first player to score touchdowns in back-to-back Super Bowls, having a receiving touchdown in Super Bowl V.

Dolphins safety Jake Scott entered Super Bowl VI with a broken left hand. He broke his right wrist during the game but never came out. With both hands in casts for three months, he said "When I go to the bathroom, that's when I find out who my real friends are."

This was the first Super Bowl to match two teams which played its home games on artificial turf. Both of the Cowboys' home stadiums of 1971, the Cotton Bowl and Texas Stadium, had turf, as did the Dolphins' Orange Bowl (specifically Poly-Turf). The previous year, the Cowboys became the first team to play its home games on turf to make it to a Super Bowl.

It was hoped the Louisiana Superdome would be ready in time for the 1972 NFL season (had construction stayed on schedule, it is likely this game would have been played elsewhere, with either Super Bowl VII or Super Bowl VIII awarded to New Orleans). However, wrangling between labor unions and Louisiana politicians, led by Governor John McKeithen, caused a lengthy delay in construction, and groundbreaking did not take place until August 11, 1971, five months before this game, and five months after New Orleans was named host. The Superdome was not completed until August 1975, forcing Super Bowl IX to be moved to Tulane Stadium. That Super Bowl proved to be the final NFL game in the stadium, which was demolished in late 1979.

The night before the game, Joe Frazier successfully defended his heavyweight boxing championship with a fourth-round knockout of Terry Daniels (at the time of the fight, a student at Dallas' Southern Methodist University) at the Rivergate Convention Center (now Caesar's Palace New Orleans), which was one mile south of the construction site for the Superdome on Poydras Street. The next day, the Rivergate hosted a closed-circuit television broadcast of the game, charging $10 per person.

The temperature at kickoff was a sunny and windy 39 °F (4 °C), making this the coldest Super Bowl to date.

This was the first Super Bowl in which both starting quarterbacks wore the same number (12). This occurred again when Staubach's Cowboys faced the Pittsburgh Steelers, quarterbacked by Terry Bradshaw, in Super Bowl X and Super Bowl XIII; the first instance not involving Staubach did not arrive until Super Bowl LVI, when the Rams' Matthew Stafford and Bengals' Joe Burrow both wore number 9.

This was the final Super Bowl where both teams' head coaches (Landry of the Cowboys, Shula of the Dolphins) wore suits.

== Broadcasting ==
The game was broadcast in the United States by CBS with play-by-play announcer Ray Scott and color commentator Pat Summerall. Jack Whitaker hosted the pregame show, and Tom Brookshier conducted locker room interviews post-game.

Although Tulane Stadium was sold out for the game, unconditional blackout rules in the NFL prohibited the live telecast from being shown in the New Orleans area (Note: WWL-TV aired the movies Texas Lady and In Old Chicago and an episode of the 1952-53 World War II documentary series Victory at Sea as filler programming.). This was the last Super Bowl to be blacked out in the TV market in which the game was played (the NFL allowed WWL to air the game on tape delay at midnight). The game was not blacked out in Baton Rouge, which was blacked out during Saints home games and broadcasts of the Sugar Bowl played in the same stadium.

The following year, the NFL allowed Super Bowl VII to be televised live in the host city (Los Angeles) when all tickets were sold. In 1973, the league changed its blackout policy to allow any game to be broadcast in the home team's market if sold out 72 hours in advance. The blackout rule has been suspended since 2015.

Except for a portion of the Cowboys first scoring drive and the Dolphins only scoring drive (both drives ended with field goals), the complete original broadcast exists.

=== In popular culture ===
This game was featured in the movie Where the Buffalo Roam where the protagonist character Hunter S. Thompson is sent to cover the game by Rolling Stone magazine, although the host site set in the movie is Los Angeles Memorial Coliseum (site of Super Bowl VII), not Tulane Stadium.

== Entertainment ==
The Tyler Junior College Apache Belles drill team performed during the pregame and halftime festivities. Later, the U.S. Air Force Academy Chorale sang the national anthem. This was followed by an eight-plane flyover of F-4 Phantoms from Eglin Air Force Base, which featured a plane in the missing man formation.

Despite being the second Super Bowl after the AFL–NFL merger, Super Bowl VI was the first one to have the NFL logo painted at the 50-yard line. The NFL would do this for all but one Super Bowl after this until Super Bowl XXXI (the exception was Super Bowl XXV, when the Super Bowl logo was painted at midfield instead).

=== Halftime show ===
Super Bowl VI halftime show
- Part of: Super Bowl VI
- Date: January 16, 1972
- Location: New Orleans, Louisiana
- Venue: Tulane Stadium
- Theme: Salute to Louis Armstrong
- Headliner: The Tyler Junior College Apache Band and Belles; United States Marine Corps Drill Team; Carol Channing; Ella Fitzgerald; Al Hirt
- Special guests: Onward Brass Band; Danny Barker; Leroy Jones

Super Bowl halftime show chronology
V (1971)	VI (1972)	VII (1973)

The Super Bowl VI halftime show was themed as a "Salute to Louis Armstrong" (Armstrong, a New Orleans native, died in July 1971). Headlining the show were jazz singer Ella Fitzgerald, actress and singer Carol Channing, trumpeter Al Hirt and the U.S. Marine Corps Drill Team. Also performing were the Onward Brass Band with Danny Barker, and young Leroy Jones as "Little Louis Armstrong".

Fitzgerald was the first Black woman to sing in a Super Bowl halftime show. She is also considered to be the first jazz artist featured in such a manner in a Super Bowl halftime show.

This was the second of three Super Bowl halftime shows in which Al Hirt was a headlining performer. Hirt, a minority shareholder of the New Orleans Saints, had previously been among the headlining performers in the halftime shows of Super Bowl I, and would subsequently be a headlining performer in the halftime show of Super Bowl XII. Also returning to the Super Bowl halftime stage was Carol Channing, who had previously been a performer in the halftime show of Super Bowl IV.

In the show, the Onward Brass Band performed "High Society" and accompanied Carol Channing in performing "Hello, Dolly!". Al Hirt accompanied Ella Fitzgerald in performing "Mack the Knife".

== Game summary ==
According to Roger Staubach, the Cowboys' game plan was to neutralize the Dolphins' key offensive and defensive players—Paul Warfield and Nick Buoniconti. Warfield was double-teamed by Green and Renfro. "They pretty much shut him down", wrote Staubach. Since the running game was the key to the Cowboys' offense, they wanted to take the quick-reacting Buoniconti out of each play. Two linemen, usually Niland and center Dave Manders, were assigned to block Buoniconti. Combined with counterplays and the excellent cutback running of Thomas, this tactic proved very successful. Buoniconti sustained a concussion which he suffered from throughout the second half, during which he did not keep track of the score, thinking it was still 10–3 when it had become 24–3.

Miami's defense was designed to stop Staubach's scrambling. According to Staubach, although his scrambling was shut down this did not work to the Dolphins' benefit because it opened things up for the other backs.

=== First quarter ===
Miami won the coin toss and elected to receive. Neither team could mount a drive on their first possessions. On the first play of the Dolphins' second possession, fullback Larry Csonka, on his first carry of the game, gained 12 yards on a sweep aided by a big block by guard Larry Little on cornerback Herb Adderley. It would be his longest gain of the day. On the next play, Csonka fumbled a handoff from quarterback Bob Griese, his first fumble of the season, and it was recovered by linebacker Chuck Howley at the Cowboys' 48-yard line. A pair of runs for 18 total yards by fullback Walt Garrison put Dallas within field goal range, but on the next play, defensive tackle Bob Heinz and defensive end Jim Riley shared a sack on quarterback Roger Staubach for a 12-yard loss. However, Staubach found Bob Hayes open for an 18-yard pass and completed an 11-yard pass to running back Duane Thomas to bring up 1st-and-goal at Miami's 7-yard line. The Dolphins' defense managed to keep the Cowboys out of the end zone, forcing them to settle for kicker Mike Clark's 9-yard field goal to give the Cowboys a 3–0 lead.

On the third play of the Dolphins' next possession at their own 38-yard line, Griese was sacked by Cowboys defensive tackle Bob Lilly for a Super Bowl record 29-yard loss, which still stands as the longest negative play from scrimmage in Super Bowl history.

=== Second quarter ===
To start the second quarter, Dolphins punter Larry Seiple punted the ball from Miami's own end zone, which was caught at the Dallas 45 by Hayes. The Cowboys could not get past the Miami 40, so they punted it back to the Dolphins. Miami drove to the Cowboys' 42-yard line with the aid of a 20-yard reception by wide receiver Howard Twilley, but the drive stalled and ended with no points after kicker Garo Yepremian missed a 49-yard field goal attempt.

After an exchange of punts, starting with 6:15 left in the half, Dallas drove 76 yards in 10 plays, including a 21-yard reception on 3rd-and-9 by wide receiver Lance Alworth and running back Calvin Hill's three carries for 25 yards. The drive ended with Staubach's 7-yard touchdown pass to Alworth to increase Dallas' lead to 10–0 (Alworth would refer to the receptions that he made on the scoring drive as "The two most important catches of his career"). Miami started the ensuing drive at their own 31-yard line with just 1:15 left in the half, and Griese completed three consecutive passes, two to wide receiver Paul Warfield and one to running back Jim Kiick, for 44 total yards to reach the Dallas 24-yard line. Despite their excellent field position, the Dolphins could not reach the end zone and had to settle for Yepremian's 31-yard field goal to cut their deficit to 10–3 going into halftime.

=== Third quarter ===
The Cowboys shut out the Dolphins in the second half, preventing any chance of a Miami comeback. Dallas reasoned that Miami would make adjustments to stop the Cowboys' inside running game which had been so successful in the first half. So the Cowboys decided to run outside. The Cowboys opened the third quarter with a 71-yard, 8-play scoring drive, which included a 12-yard reception by Hill, four runs by Thomas for 37 yards, and a 16-yard run by Hayes. Thomas ended the drive with his 3-yard touchdown run to increase Dallas' lead to 17–3. This seemed to fire up the Cowboys' defense, who managed to prevent the Dolphins' offense from getting a single first down in the entire third quarter. The farthest advance Miami had in the third quarter was to their own 42-yard line as Griese and the offense were, as Dolphins coach Don Shula put it, "destroyed." Three possessions later, on an incomplete pass on third down, Dolphins safety Jake Scott hit Staubach on a blitz that shook him up with under two minutes remaining in the period, but Staubach returned in the fourth.

=== Fourth quarter ===
Miami managed to advance to midfield early in the final period, opening the fourth quarter with their first third down conversion of the game. Howley ended the drive, however, by intercepting a pass from Griese intended for Kiick. After returning the ball 41 yards, Howley tripped and fell at the Dolphins' 9-yard line with no one near him. He then got up and spiked the ball out of frustration for not scoring a touchdown. But three plays later, Dallas capitalized on the turnover with Staubach's 7-yard touchdown pass to tight end Mike Ditka, increasing their lead to 24–3 with 12 minutes left in the game.

Miami began their next possession at their own 23-yard line and mounted only their third sustained drive of the game, reaching the Dallas 16-yard line in six plays, which included a 16-yard reception by Csonka and two receptions by tight end Marv Fleming for 37 yards. However, when Miami reached the Dallas 16, Griese fumbled the snap, and defensive end Larry Cole recovered it at the 20-yard line. The Cowboys then mounted an 11-play drive to the Miami 1-yard line which featured a 22-yard reception by Ditka, an 18-yard run by Garrison, and a 4th-and-1 conversion by running back Dan Reeves on a fake field goal attempt at the Miami 20-yard line, which was followed by a 17-yard run by Ditka to set up 1st-and-goal at the Miami 1-yard line. On the next play, however, Hill fumbled the ball while attempting to dive into the end zone, and the ball was recovered at the 4-yard line by Dolphins defensive tackle Manny Fernandez with just under two minutes left. Miami, now playing for pride, ran four meaningless plays and reached their own 26-yard line to end the game.

=== Aftermath ===
Staubach became the first quarterback of a winning team in the Super Bowl to play the entire game. Wrote Staubach, "I can say that I don't think I ever felt any better as an athlete than how I felt after that game..." Nick Buoniconti wrote, "I was knocked senseless...The Cowboys seemed to be moving so much faster than we were....We were overmatched psychologically as well as physically." Jim Kiick said, "Dallas wasn't that much better, but football is momentum. We lost it in the first quarter when we fumbled and they scored, and we never got it back." Said the Dolphins' Howard Twilley:

It's so hard to figure. We went in confident. We really thought we'd win and win handily. Something happened, though, during the week. I guess it was that week. The week has its own momentum, like nothing we'd been in before...[Shula] said we'd been embarrassed. He said we didn't even compete....That's the sickest feeling I've ever had.

Said Cornell Green, "The difference between the Dolphins and Cowboys was that the Dolphins were just happy to be in the game and the Cowboys came to win the game.".

Griese completed the same amount of passes as Staubach (12), and threw for 15 more yards (134), but threw no touchdown passes and was intercepted once. Csonka and Kiick were held to just 80 combined rushing yards (40 yards each), scored no touchdowns, and lost 1 fumble on 19 carries. Warfield was the game's leading receiver, but was limited to just 4 receptions for 39 yards. Thomas was the top rusher of the game with 19 carries for 95 yards and a touchdown. He also caught 3 passes for 17 yards. Dallas running back Walt Garrison added 74 rushing yards and caught 2 passes for 11 yards.

The Dallas Cowboys became the first team to win the Super Bowl after losing it the previous year. The Miami Dolphins would duplicate this feat the following season by winning Super Bowl VII. This would be the only game the Dolphins would lose in 1972, going undefeated the next season prior to their Super Bowl VII win. Miami's 3 points scored set a Super Bowl record in scoring futility, which was tied by the Los Angeles Rams in Super Bowl LIII in 2019. The Kansas City Chiefs also failed to score a touchdown in their 31–9 loss to the Tampa Bay Buccaneers in Super Bowl LV in February 2021.

=== Box score ===
Super Bowl VI: Dallas Cowboys 24, Miami Dolphins 3

Quarter	1	2	3	4	Total
Cowboys (NFC)	3	7	7	7	24
Dolphins (AFC)	0	3	0	0	3

at Tulane Stadium, New Orleans, Louisiana

- Date: January 16, 1972
- Game time: 1:35 p.m. CST
- Game weather: 39 °F (4 °C), windy.

Scoring summary

Quarter	Time	Drive			Team	Scoring information	Score	
Quarter	Time	Plays	Yards	TOP	Team	Scoring information	DAL	MIA
1	1:23	11	50	7:48	DAL	9-yard field goal by Mike Clark	3	0
2	1:15	10	76	5:00	DAL	Lance Alworth 7-yard touchdown reception from Roger Staubach, Clark kick good	10	0
2	0:04	4	44	1:11	MIA	31-yard field goal by Garo Yepremian	10	3
3	9:43	8	71	5:17	DAL	Duane Thomas 3-yard touchdown run, Clark kick good	17	3
4	11:42	3	9	0:53	DAL	Mike Ditka 7-yard touchdown reception from Staubach, Clark kick good	24	3
"TOP" = time of possession. For other American football terms, see Glossary of American football.							24	3

== Final statistics ==
Sources:The NFL's Official Encyclopedic History of Professional Football, (1973), p. 153, Macmillan Publishing Co. New York, LCCN 73-3862, NFL.com Super Bowl VI, Super Bowl VI Play Finder Dal, Super Bowl VI Play Finder Mia, Super Bowl VI Play by Play

=== Statistical comparison ===
	Dallas Cowboys	Miami Dolphins
First downs	23	10
First downs rushing	15	3
First downs passing	8	7
First downs penalty	0	0
Third down efficiency	7/14	2/9
Fourth down efficiency	1/1	0/0
Net yards rushing	252	80
Rushing attempts	48	20
Yards per rush	5.3	4.0
Passing – Completions/attempts	12/18	12/23
Times sacked-total yards	2–19	1–29
Interceptions thrown	0	1
Net yards passing	100	105
Total net yards	352	185
Punt returns-total yards	1–(–1)	1–21
Kickoff returns-total yards	2–34	5–122
Interceptions-total return yards	1–41	0–0
Punts-average yardage	5–37.2	5–40.0
Fumbles-lost	1–1	2–2
Penalties-total yards	3–15	0–0
Time of possession	39:12	20:48
Turnovers	1	3

=== Individual statistics ===
Cowboys passing
	C/ATT^{1}	Yds	TD	INT	Rating
Roger Staubach	12/19	119	2	0	115.9
Cowboys rushing
	Car^{2}	Yds	TD	LG^{3}	Yds/Car
Duane Thomas	19	95	1	23	5.00
Walt Garrison	14	74	0	17	5.29
Calvin Hill	7	25	0	13	3.57
Roger Staubach	5	18	0	5	3.60
Mike Ditka	1	17	0	17	17.00
Bob Hayes	1	16	0	16	16.00
Dan Reeves	1	7	0	7	7.00
Cowboys receiving
	Rec^{4}	Yds	TD	LG^{3}	Target^{5}
Duane Thomas	3	17	0	11	3
Lance Alworth	2	28	1	21	4
Mike Ditka	2	28	1	21	3
Bob Hayes	2	23	0	18	5
Walt Garrison	2	11	0	7	2
Calvin Hill	1	12	0	12	1

Dolphins passing
	C/ATT^{1}	Yds	TD	INT	Rating
Bob Griese	12/23	134	0	1	51.7
Dolphins rushing
	Car^{2}	Yds	TD	LG^{3}	Yds/Car
Larry Csonka	9	40	0	12	4.44
Jim Kiick	10	40	0	9	4.00
Bob Griese	1	0	0	0	0.00
Dolphins receiving
	Rec^{4}	Yds	TD	LG^{3}	Target^{5}
Paul Warfield	4	39	0	23	10
Jim Kiick	3	21	0	11	6
Larry Csonka	2	18	0	16	2
Marv Fleming	1	27	0	27	2
Howard Twilley	1	20	0	20	2
Jim Mandich	1	9	0	9	1

^{1}Completions/attempts ^{2}Carries ^{3}Long gain ^{4}Receptions ^{5}Times targeted

=== Records set ===
The following records were set or tied in Super Bowl VI, according to the official NFL.com boxscore and the ProFootball reference.com game summary. Some records have to meet NFL minimum number of attempts to be recognized. The minimums are shown (in parentheses).

Records set in Super Bowl VI
Rushing records
Most yards, career	139	Walt Garrison (Dallas)
Most attempts, career	37	Duane Thomas (Dallas)
Highest average gain, career (20 attempts)	5.3 yards (139–26)	Walt Garrison
Combined yardage records ^{†}
Most attempts, career	44	Duane Thomas
Defense
Most interceptions, career	3	Chuck Howley (Dallas)
Special Teams
Longest kickoff return	37 yards	Mercury Morris (Miami)
Most punts, career	14	Ron Widby (Dallas)
Records tied
Most touchdowns, career	2	Duane Thomas
Most touchdown passes, game	2	Roger Staubach (Dallas)
Most kickoff returns, game	4	Mercury Morris
Most kickoff returns, career	4	Mercury Morris
Most kickoff return yards, game	90 yards	Mercury Morris
Most kickoff return yards, career	90 yards	Mercury Morris
Highest kickoff return average, game (3 returns)	22.5 yards (4–90)	Mercury Morris
Highest kickoff return average, career (4 returns)	22.5 yards (4–90)	Mercury Morris
Most fumbles, game Most fumbles, career	1	Calvin Hill (Dallas)
Most fumbles, game Most fumbles, career	1	Bob Griese; Larry Csonka (Miami)
Most fumbles recovered, game Most fumbles recovered, career	1	Larry Cole (Dallas); Chuck Howley
Most fumbles recovered, game Most fumbles recovered, career	1	Manny Fernandez (Miami)

- † This category includes rushing, receiving, interception returns, punt returns, kickoff returns, and fumble returns.
- ‡ Sacks an official statistic since Super Bowl XVII by the NFL. Sacks are listed as "Tackled Attempting to Pass" in the official NFL box score for Super Bowl III.

Team records set
Points, Touchdowns
Fewest points, game	3	Dolphins
Fewest points, second half	0	Dolphins
Fewest touchdowns, game	0	Dolphins
Net yards
Fewest net yards, rushing and passing	185	Dolphins
Rushing
Most rushing attempts	48	Cowboys
Most rushing yards (net)	252	Cowboys
Passing
Fewest yards passing (net)	100	Cowboys
First downs
Most first downs	23	Cowboys
Most first downs rushing	15	Cowboys
Defense
Fewest yards allowed	185	Cowboys
Punting
Lowest average, game (4 punts)	37.2 yards (5–186)	Cowboys
Punt returns
Fewest yards gained, game	–1 yards	Cowboys
Penalties
Fewest penalties, game	0	Dolphins
Fewest yards penalized, game	0	Dolphins
Records tied
Most Super Bowl appearances	2	Cowboys
Most consecutive Super Bowl appearances	2	Cowboys
Most passing touchdowns	2	Cowboys
Most Super Bowl losses	1	Dolphins
Fewest passing touchdowns	0	Dolphins
Fewest rushing touchdowns	0	Dolphins
Fewest first downs	10	Dolphins
Fewest first downs penalty	0	Cowboys; Dolphins
Fewest punt returns, game	1	Cowboys; Dolphins

Turnovers are defined as the number of times losing the ball on interceptions and fumbles.

Records set, both team totals
	Total	Cowboys	Dolphins
Rushing, both teams
Most rushing attempts	68	48	20
Most rushing yards (net)	332	252	80
Passing, Both Teams
Fewest passing attempts	42	19	23
Fewest yards passing (net)	205	100	105
First downs, Both Teams
Most first downs rushing	18	15	3
Fewest first downs, penalty	0	0	0
Punt returns, Both Teams
Fewest punt returns, game	2	1	1
Penalties, Both Teams
Fewest penalties, game	3	3	0
Fewest yards penalized	15	15	0
Records tied, both team totals
Fewest rushing touchdowns	1	1	0
Fewest times intercepted	1	0	1
Fewest interceptions by	1	1	0

== Starting lineups ==
Hall of Fame ‡

Dallas	Position	Miami
Offense
Bob Hayes‡	WR	Paul Warfield‡
Tony Liscio	LT	Doug Crusan
John Niland	LG	Bob Kuechenberg
Dave Manders	C	Bob DeMarco
Blaine Nye	RG	Larry Little‡
Rayfield Wright‡	RT	Norm Evans
Mike Ditka‡	TE	Marv Fleming
Lance Alworth‡	WR	Howard Twilley
Roger Staubach‡	QB	Bob Griese‡
Duane Thomas	RB	Jim Kiick
Walt Garrison	RB	Larry Csonka‡
Defense
Larry Cole	LE	Jim Riley
Jethro Pugh	LT	Manny Fernandez
Bob Lilly‡	RT	Bob Heinz
George Andrie	RE	Bill Stanfill
Dave Edwards	LLB	Doug Swift
Lee Roy Jordan	MLB	Nick Buoniconti‡
Chuck Howley‡	RLB	Mike Kolen
Herb Adderley‡	LCB	Tim Foley
Mel Renfro‡	RCB	Curtis Johnson
Cornell Green	LS	Dick Anderson
Cliff Harris‡	RS	Jake Scott

== Officials ==
- Referee: Jim Tunney #32, first Super Bowl
- Umpire: Joe Connell #57, first Super Bowl
- Head linesman: Al Sabato #10, second Super Bowl (I)
- Line judge: Art Holst #33, first Super Bowl
- Back judge: Ralph Vandenberg #47, first Super Bowl
- Field judge: Bob Wortman #84, first Super Bowl
- Alternate referee: Bernie Ulman #6, worked Super Bowl I as head linesman
- Alternate umpire: Tony Sacco #18, did not work Super Bowl on the field during career

All on-field officials except Vandenberg were on the crew for Super Bowl XII, the first Super Bowl at the Superdome.

Bernie Ulman was the referee for Super Bowl IX, the last professional football game played at Tulane Stadium.

Note: A seven-official system was not used until the 1978 season
