= Duane Thomas =

American football player (1947–2024)

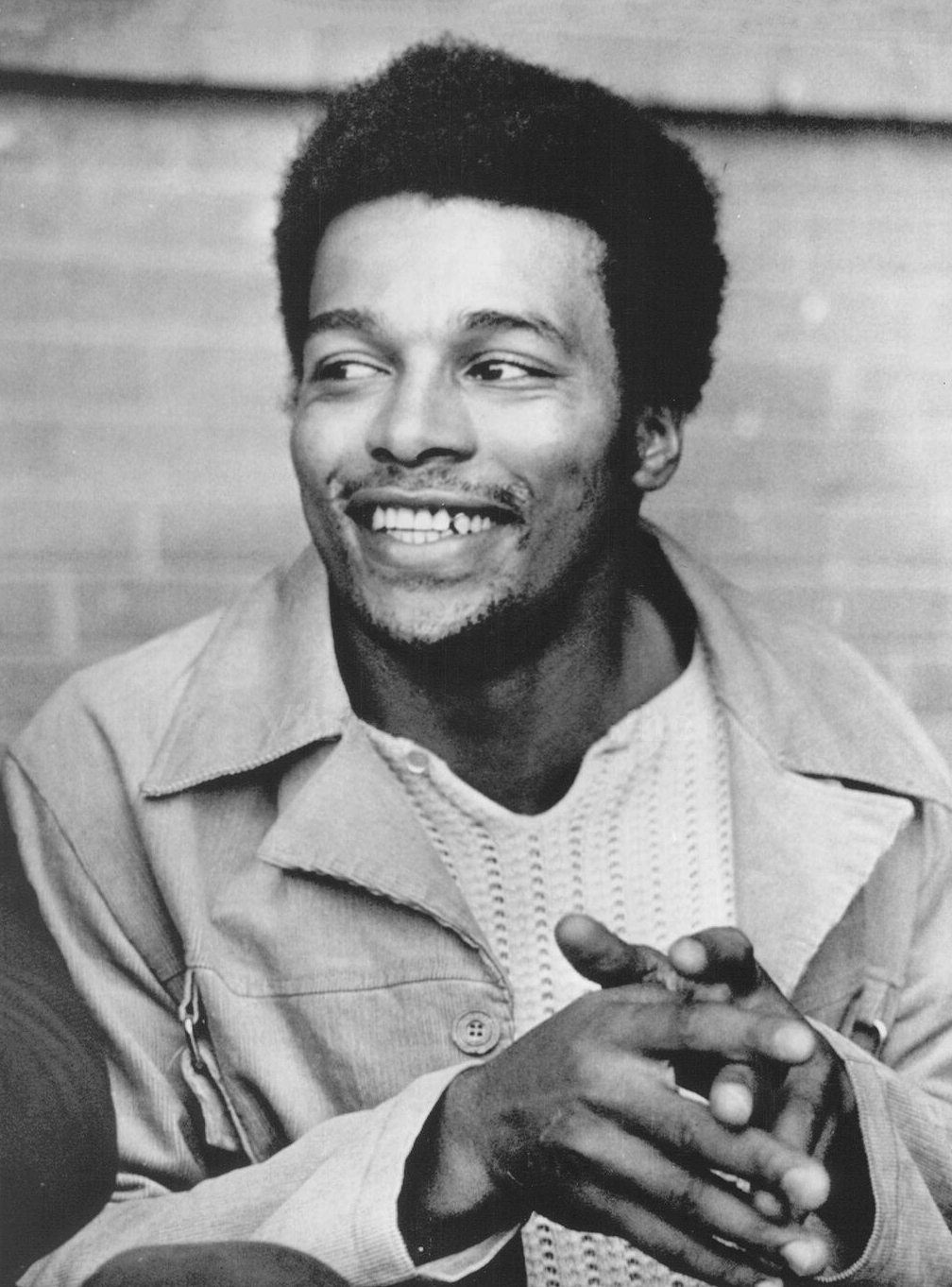
- Thomas in 1972

No. 33, 47
- Position: Running back

Personal information
- Born: June 21, 1947; Dallas, Texas, U.S.
- Died: August 4, 2024 (aged 77); Sedona, Arizona, U.S.
- Listed height: 6 ft 1 in (1.85 m)
- Listed weight: 220 lb (100 kg)

Career information
- High school: Lincoln (Dallas)
- College: West Texas State (1966-1969)
- NFL draft: 1970: 1st round, 23rd overall pick

Career history
- Dallas Cowboys (1970–1971); San Diego Chargers (1972)*; Washington Redskins (1973–1974); The Hawaiians (1975); Dallas Cowboys (1976)*; British Columbia Lions (1977)*; Green Bay Packers (1979)*
- * Offseason or practice squad member only

Awards and highlights
- Super Bowl champion (VI); NFL rushing touchdowns leader (1971)

Career NFL statistics
- Rushing yards: 2,038
- Rushing average: 4.5
- Receptions: 38
- Receiving yards: 297
- Total touchdowns: 24
- Stats at Pro Football Reference

Duane Julius Thomas (June 21, 1947 – August 4, 2024) was an American professional football player who was a running back in the National Football League (NFL) for the Dallas Cowboys and the Washington Redskins. He played college football for the West Texas State Buffaloes.

== Early life ==
Born and raised in Dallas, Texas, Thomas was an exceptional running back at Lincoln High School in the mid-1960s. He continued his success at West Texas State University in Canyon, playing fullback alongside Mercury Morris, while running through defenses for Joe Kerbel's teams. After a freshman year with just 10 carries for 42 yards, he led the country with 7.2 yards per carry on still-limited duty his sophomore season (83 carries for 596 yards). After 113 carries for 708 yards his junior year, he broke through his senior year with 199 carries for 1,072 yards and 10 touchdowns. He ended his college career with 396 carries for 2,376 yards (then 2nd all-time to Bill Cross, currently 8th).

In 1970, he played in the Coaches All-America Game.

== Professional career ==
=== Dallas Cowboys (first stint) ===
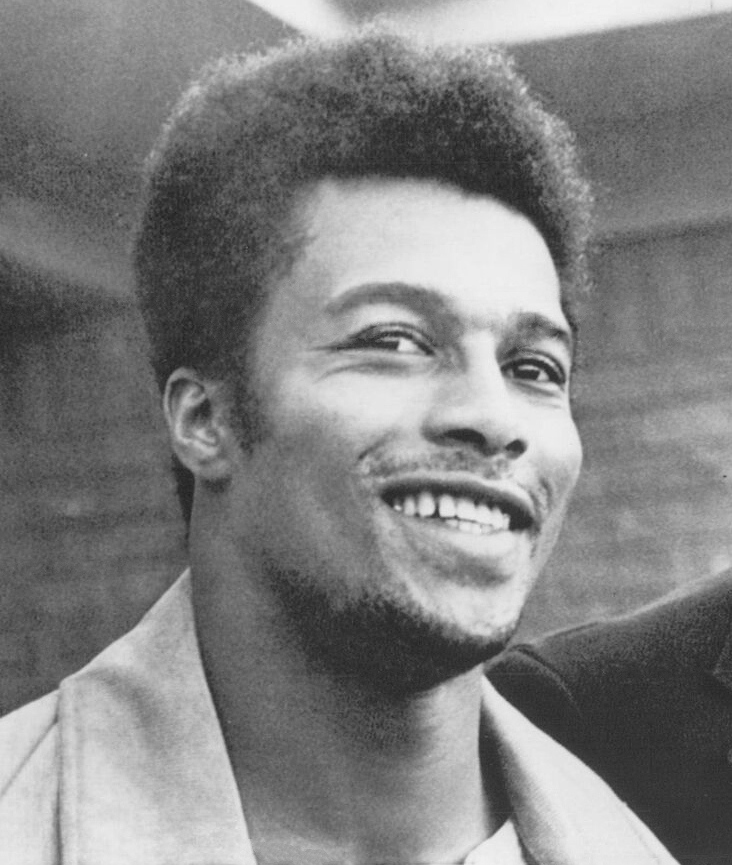
Thomas in 1972

Thomas was selected by the Dallas Cowboys in the first round (23rd overall) of the 1970 NFL draft. As a rookie, even though he did not start until the fifth game of the season, he led the team in rushing, while finishing eighth in the newly merged 26-team league with 803 rushing yards (second in the National Football Conference behind NFL rushing champion Larry Brown of the rival Washington Redskins) on 151 carries (a league-leading 5.3 yards per carry) and 5 touchdowns. At the end of the season, already being compared to Jim Brown, he was named the NFL rookie of the year. In playoff wins over Detroit and San Francisco, Thomas rushed for 135 and 143 yards, becoming the first rookie with two 100-yard rushing playoff games. When asked "Is this the ultimate game?" during the week leading up to Super Bowl V, he replied, "Well, they're playing it next year, aren't they?" He had 18 rushes and four receptions for 37 and 21 yards respectively, caught a 7‐yard touchdown pass as Dallas took a 13–6 lead in the second quarter and fumbled at the Baltimore Colts' one‐yard line in the Cowboys' first possession of the second half.

During the offseason Thomas requested his three-year contract be rewritten. When Cowboys management refused to renegotiate, he called team president Tex Schramm “deceitful,” player personnel director Gil Brandt “a liar” and head coach Tom Landry “a plastic man...no man at all." Following his refusal to report to training camp, Thomas was traded on July 31, 1971 to the New England Patriots with Halvor Hagen and Honor Jackson, in exchange for Carl Garrett and the Patriots' first choice in the 1972 NFL draft. Within a week, because of problems with the Patriots and head coach John Mazur, in an unprecedented move NFL commissioner Pete Rozelle voided part of the trade, sending Thomas and Garrett back to their original teams. The Patriots kept Hagen and Jackson in exchange for a second (#35-Robert Newhouse) and third round (possibly 1972 #64-Mike Keller) draft choices in the 1972 NFL draft. Thomas returned to the Cowboys, but decided to keep silent all season long, refusing to speak to teammates, management, or the media.

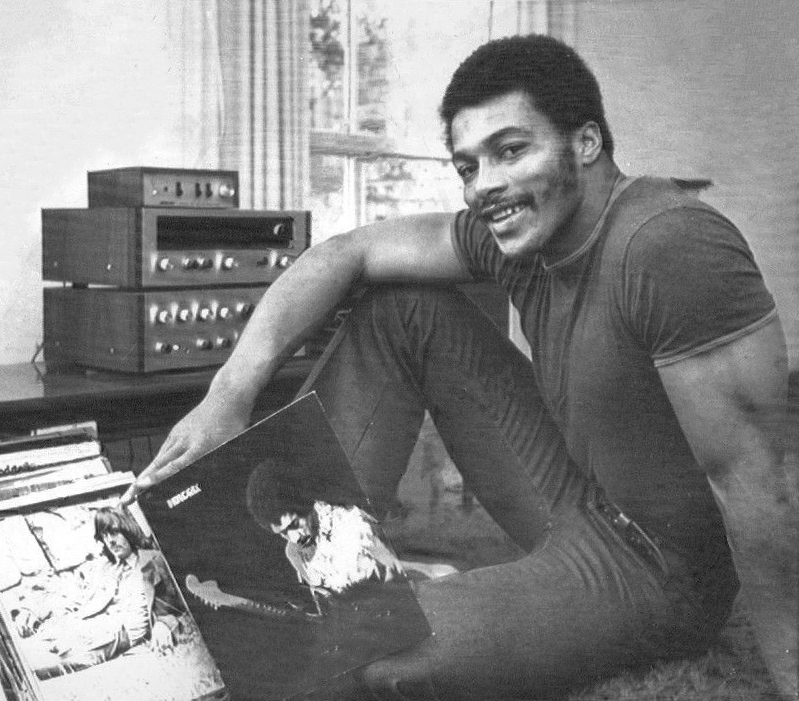
Thomas in 1971

In October 1971, Thomas scored the first touchdown in the new Texas Stadium playing against the Patriots. That same season, Thomas led the league in rushing touchdowns (11) and total touchdowns (13). He also was named All-Pro and led the Cowboys with 95 rushing yards and a touchdown in Dallas' 24–3 win over the Miami Dolphins in Super Bowl VI, the franchise's first. In a postgame interview following that Super Bowl, CBS television announcer Tom Brookshier noted Thomas' speed and asked him, rhetorically, "Are you that fast?" Thomas responded, "Evidently." According to Hunter S. Thompson, "All he did was take the ball and run every time they called his number—which came to be more and more often, and in the Super Bowl Thomas was the whole show."

Thomas was reportedly voted as the Super Bowl Most Valuable Player by an overwhelming margin. Thomas, however, had boycotted the media throughout the season as well, and Larry Klein, editor of Sport, which presented the award, did not know how Thomas would act at a banquet in New York. With this in mind Klein announced quarterback Roger Staubach as the winner.

During the 1972 off-season he became even more isolated and insubordinate, so he was traded to the San Diego Chargers for Mike Montgomery and Billy Parks on July 31, 1972.

=== San Diego Chargers ===
Thomas began his stint with the Chargers by earning a 20-day suspension for failing to report to the team, and matters deteriorated from there. He never played a game for the Chargers, as the team placed him on the reserve list, making him ineligible for the rest of the 1972 season.

On July 20, 1973, the Chargers traded Thomas to defending NFC champion Washington in exchange for the Redskins' first draft choice (#22-Mike Williams) in the 1975 NFL draft and their second draft choice (#46-David Hill) in 1976.

=== Washington Redskins ===
Thomas played with the Washington Redskins in 1973 and 1974, rushing for a total of 442 yards under head coach George Allen. Reportedly seeking a substantial salary increase, he did not report to training camp in 1975, and was waived on August 13.

=== The Hawaiians (WFL) ===
In August 1975, Thomas was signed by the Hawaiians of the World Football League to replace an injured Calvin Hill, although the Philadelphia Bell claimed they owned Thomas' negotiating rights after being released by the Washington Redskins. He was with the team for only 1½ months and was released in early October, just weeks before the league folded.

=== Dallas Cowboys (second stint) ===
On May 1, 1976, the Dallas Cowboys signed Thomas again for a comeback, but he was waived before the season started.

=== British Columbia Lions (CFL) ===
Thomas signed with the British Columbia Lions in 1977 and was placed on waivers after just a couple of weeks.

=== Green Bay Packers (NFL) ===
In March 1979, Thomas was signed by the Green Bay Packers, but was waived before the season started. He finished his NFL career with 2,038 rushing yards, 453 carries and 21 touchdowns. He also caught 38 passes for 297 yards and 3 touchdowns.

== NFL career statistics ==
Legend
| | Led the league |
| **Bold** | Career high |

=== Regular season ===
| Year | Team | Games | | Rushing | | | | | Receiving | | | | |
| Year | Team | GP | GS | Att | Yds | Avg | Lng | TD | Rec | Yds | Avg | Lng | TD |
|---|---|---|---|---|---|---|---|---|---|---|---|---|---|
| 1970 | DAL | **14** | 8 | 151 | **803** | **5.3** | 47 | 5 | 10 | 73 | 7.3 | 17 | 0 |
| 1971 | DAL | 11 | **10** | **175** | 793 | 4.5 | 56 | **11** | **13** | **153** | **11.8** | **34** | **2** |
| 1973 | WAS | 13 | 0 | 32 | 95 | 3.0 | 13 | 0 | 5 | 40 | 8.0 | 13 | 0 |
| 1974 | WAS | 11 | 3 | 95 | 347 | 3.7 | **66** | 5 | 10 | 31 | 3.1 | 9 | 1 |
| | | 49 | 21 | 453 | 2,038 | 4.5 | 66 | 21 | 38 | 297 | 7.8 | 34 | 3 |

=== Playoffs ===
| Year | Team | Games | | Rushing | | | | | Receiving | | | | |
| Year | Team | GP | GS | Att | Yds | Avg | Lng | TD | Rec | Yds | Avg | Lng | TD |
|---|---|---|---|---|---|---|---|---|---|---|---|---|---|
| 1970 | DAL | **3** | **3** | **75** | **313** | **4.2** | 21 | 1 | **6** | **45** | **7.5** | **14** | **1** |
| 1971 | DAL | **3** | **3** | 55 | 205 | 3.7 | **23** | **3** | 5 | 27 | 5.4 | 11 | 0 |
| | | 6 | 6 | 130 | 518 | 4.0 | 23 | 4 | 11 | 72 | 6.5 | 14 | 1 |

== Legacy ==
With the help of freelance sportswriter Paul Zimmerman in 1989, Thomas wrote Duane Thomas and the Fall of America's Team, a memoir of Thomas' time playing for the Dallas Cowboys. A Publishers Weekly reviewer of the book commented, "The title implies, although the text nowhere suggests, that there is a relation between the fate of running back Thomas and the decline in the fortunes of the Dallas Cowboys. Thomas, when he appeared on the professional football scene in 1970, was acclaimed as an outstanding player but within two years was stigmatized as an 'emotionally disturbed misfit', largely because of his periods of total silence."

Before he was out of football, Thomas got a job at Twentieth Century Fox Film Corporation in the Legal Department and decided to go back into football. He was called by the Green Bay Packers and went there to try out, but they used him mainly as a blocking back during that preseason and he did not make the team.

In 2004, he was inducted into the Texas Black Sports Hall of Fame.

In 2007, Thomas was one of three Cowboys, along with Bob Lilly and Roger Staubach, interviewed for the 1971 Cowboys edition of America's Game: The Super Bowl Champions, the NFL Network anthology series chronicling each Super Bowl champion.

== Death ==
Thomas died of a pulmonary embolism at his home in Sedona, Arizona on August 4, 2024 at the age of 77.
