= Dave Manders =

American football player (born 1941)

No. 51, 52
- Position: Center

Personal information
- Born: February 20, 1941 (age 85); Milwaukee, Wisconsin, U.S.
- Listed height: 6 ft 2 in (1.88 m)
- Listed weight: 250 lb (113 kg)

Career information
- High school: Kingsford (MI)
- College: Michigan State
- NFL draft: 1962: undrafted

Career history
- Dallas Cowboys (1962)*; Toledo Tornadoes (1962-1963); Dallas Cowboys (1963–1974)
- * Offseason or practice squad member only

Awards and highlights
- Super Bowl champion (VI); Pro Bowl (1966); Third-team All-Big Ten (1960)

Career NFL statistics
- Games played: 139
- Games started: 73
- Fumble recoveries: 2
- Stats at Pro Football Reference

David Francis Manders (born February 20, 1941) is an American former professional football player who was a center in the National Football League (NFL) from 1964 through 1974. He played college football for the Michigan State Spartans. He graduated from Kingsford High School and was a key component in a Dallas Cowboys offensive line that dominated the NFL for a decade, playing in two Super Bowls with the Cowboys, winning one.

== Early life ==
Manders was born on February 20, 1941, in Milwaukee, Wisconsin. He played football at Kingsford High School, where he was twice named Michigan All-State in football at center, and Lineman of the Year as a senior. He also played basketball and was on the track team, and set an Upper Peninsula of Michigan shot put record.

His number 51 is only one of three numbers retired by the school, along with Dick Berlinski, who also played football at Michigan State, and future 10-year NFL player Tim Kearney. Manders and Kearney became good friends, and when Kearney was at Kingsford, Manders helped him learn proper weight training.

In 1980, he was inducted into the Upper Peninsula Sports Hall of Fame.

== College career ==
Manders went on to play at Michigan State University (1959–61), wearing No. 50, where he was a two-way player, playing center on offense and linebacker on defense. He became the starting center as a sophomore in 1959. He was teammates with future Hall of Fame defensive back Herb Adderly, who would later be his teammate again with the Dallas Cowboys.

During his college career, he was among the team leaders in tackles, even though he experienced leg injuries in his last two years. As a sophomore, he was a third-team All-Big Ten selection and became an All-American honorable mention after his senior year.

== Professional career ==
Manders's college coach, future College Football Hall of Fame member Duffy Daugherty, had held back mail inquiries from NFL teams to his players to prevent distraction, and few members of his Spartans team were drafted in the 1962 NFL draft. Manders signed as a free agent with the Cowboys in 1962, to play linebacker, but after a short stay in training camp, Manders decided to return to Michigan State to complete his engineering degree. He then worked two years as an engineer at General Mills, first in Grand Rapids, Michigan and then in Toledo, Ohio, before deciding to pursue a football career again.

After spending 1963 playing semi-pro football in the United Football League for the Toledo Tornadoes, Manders called Gil Brandt in the Cowboys front office and asked for another chance. Brandt signed him in December 1963 and he made the team the next year as a center, backing up four year starting center Mike Connelly (though he did start three games).

Nicknamed "Dog" by his teammates, he was quick, strong and had huge legs. He was always considered to be one of the hardest-working players on the team. Cowboys special assistant Ermal Allen said the Cowboys would measure their players effort by comparing them to Manders, as Manders always gave 100%. In 1965, his second season in the NFL, he became the Cowboys starting center replacing Mike Connelly.

In 1966 he was selected to the Pro Bowl, becoming the first franchise offensive lineman named to the Pro Bowl. In 1967 during pre-season, he suffered a career-threatening right knee injury and missed the entire season, and was told he would never play again. Manders did return in 1968, but upon his return he served as a backup to Malcolm Walker (the starting center in 1968-69) and Connelly (himself a backup in 1968). Manders remained a backup in 1969, until he returned to form and took his job back in 1970. CoachTom Landry also made him a team captain in 1970.

He was a starter in the Cowboys first Super Bowl–Super Bowl V, held in Miami on January 17 1971 against the Baltimore Colts. He was also involved in one of the game's controversial plays, when the Cowboys Duane Thomas fumbled the ball on the Colts two-yard line. Although Manders recovered the ball, the officials still awarded it to the Colts (convinced by the Colts Billy Ray Smith he had recovered it, not Manders). The Colts won their first Super Bowl as Jim O'Brien kicked a 32-yard field goal with time running out for a 16-13 victory. Eminent Baltimore sportswriter John Steadman believed Manders's version of events.

Manders was the starting center during the period in 1971 when coach Landry was splitting time between quarterbacks Craig Morton and Roger Staubach, in a competition to determine the number one starting quarterback.

He was the starter in the Cowboys first championship team in franchise history, that won Super Bowl VI in 1972. In 1973, he retired due to a contract dispute, but by the month of September, he was back working out with the team. He played in the majority of games during that season as center on special teams, although John Fitzgerald was the starter at center for the Cowboys in 1973-74. He continued splitting time with Fitzgerald until his retirement at the end of the 1974 season.

== Personal life ==
After retiring, Manders and his wife moved to McKinney, Texas, where he ran a commercial landscaping company.
