= 1980 Washington Redskins season =

NFL team season

- Owner: Jack Kent Cooke
- General manager: Bobby Beathard
- President: Edward Bennett Williams
- Head coach: Jack Pardee
- Offensive coordinator: Joe Walton
- Defensive coordinator: Doc Urich
- Home stadium: RFK Stadium

Results
- Record: 6–10
- Division place: 3rd NFC East
- Playoffs: Did not qualify

The 1980 Washington Redskins season was the franchise's 49th season in the National Football League (NFL) and their 43rd in Washington, D.C. They failed to improve on their 10–6 record from 1979, dropping to 6–10, their only double-digit losing season between 1964 and 1992. This was Jack Pardee's last season as head coach.

This would be the final season for several longtime Redskins players; as center Bob Kuziel, defensive end Paul Smith, strong safety Ken Houston and the two remaining members of Washington's Super Bowl VII team - offensive tackle Terry Hermeling and defensive tackle Diron Talbert - before their retirements.

== Offseason ==
=== NFL draft ===
1980 Washington Redskins draft
Round	Pick	Player	Position	College	Notes
1	18	Art Monk * ^{†}	Wide receiver	Syracuse	
2	55	Mat Mendenhall	Defensive end	BYU	
6	155	Farley Bell	Linebacker	Cincinnati	
7	187	Melvin Jones	Guard	Houston	
9	241	Lawrence McCullough	Wide receiver	Illinois	
10	268	Lewis Walker	Running back	Utah	
11	295	Mike Matocha	Defensive end	Texas–Arlington	
12	327	Marcene Emmett	Defensive back	North Alabama	
Made roster † Pro Football Hall of Fame * Made at least one Pro Bowl during career

=== Undrafted free agents ===
1980 undrafted free agents of note
Player	Position	College
Mark Anderson	Safety	Michigan State
Mark Freeman	Safety	Rutgers
Zion McKinney	Wide receiver	South Carolina

== Personnel ==
=== Staff ===
1980 Washington Redskins staff
Front office: Chairman of the Board/Chief Executive Officer – Jack Kent Cooke; President – Edward Bennett Williams; General Manager – Bobby Beathard; Executive Assistant to the President – Bobby Mitchell; Assistant General Manager – Joel Margolis; Assistant General Manager – Dick Meyers; Director of Player Personnel – Mike Allman; Director of Pro Scouting – Kirk Mee; Director of College Scouting – Dick Daniels; Personnel Scouts – Charley Casserly, Charley Taylor; Head coaches: Head Coach – Jack Pardee; Special Assistant to Head Coach – Bob Bowser; Offensive coaches: Offensive Coordinator – Joe Walton; Running Backs – Fred O'Connor; Tight Ends – John Hilton; Offensive Line – Ray Callahan	Defensive coaches: Defensive Coordinator/Defensive Line – Doc Urich; Linebackers – George Dickson; Defensive Secondary – Richie Petitbon; Special teams coaches: Special Teams – John Hilton

=== Roster ===
1980 Washington Redskins roster
Quarterbacks (QB): 15 Mike Kruczek; 11 Kim McQuilken; 7 Joe Theismann; Running backs (RB): 35 Rickey Claitt; 30 Ike Forte; 34 Bobby Hammond; 22 Buddy Hardeman; 38 Clarence Harmon; 40 Wilbur Jackson; Wide receivers (WR): 89 Kenny Harrison; 84 Zion McKinney; 81 Art Monk; 83 Ricky Thompson; Tight ends (TE): 88 Rick Walker; 85 Don Warren	Offensive linemen (OL): 53 Jeff Bostic C; 75 Terry Hermeling T; 54 Bob Kuziel C; 62 Dan Nugent G; 56 Dan Peiffer C; 64 Ron Saul G; 67 Jerry Scanlan T; 74 George Starke T; 73 Jeff Williams G; Defensive linemen (DL): 79 Coy Bacon DE; 65 Dave Butz DT; 82 Dallas Hickman DE/OLB; 77 Joe Jones DE; 71 Karl Lorch DE; 78 Paul Smith DT; 72 Diron Talbert DT	Linebackers (LB): 51 Monte Coleman OLB; 59 Brad Dusek OLB; 57 Rich Milot MLB; 52 Neal Olkewicz MLB; 50 Pete Wysocki OLB; Defensive backs (DB): 27 Ken Houston SS; 20 Joe Lavender CB; 29 Mark Murphy FS; 21 Mike Nelms FS; 24 Lemar Parrish CB; 23 Tony Peters SS; 45 Jeris White CB; Special teams (ST): 10 Mike Connell P; 3 Mark Moseley K	Reserve: -- Farley Bell LB (Left squad); 69 Perry Brooks DT (IR); 63 Fred Dean T/G (IR); 86 Phil DuBois TE (IR); —- Mike Gibbons T (IR); 61 Melvin Jones G (IR); 80 John McDaniel WR (IR); 76 Mat Mendenhall DE (IR); 78 Pat Ogrin DT (IR); 44 John Riggins RB (Left squad); 47 Ray Waddy CB (IR); 31 Lewis Walker RB (IR); Rookies in italics

== Regular season ==
=== Schedule ===
Week	Date	Opponent	Result	Record	Venue	Attendance	Recap
1	September 8	**Dallas Cowboys**	**L** 17–3	0–1	RFK Stadium	55,045	Recap
2	September 14	at **New York Giants**	**W** 23–21	1–1	Giants Stadium	73,343	Recap
3	September 21	at Oakland Raiders	**L** 21–24	1–2	Oakland–Alameda County Coliseum	45,163	Recap
4	September 28	Seattle Seahawks	**L** 0–14	1–3	RFK Stadium	53,263	Recap
5	October 5	at **Philadelphia Eagles**	**L** 14–24	1–4	Veterans Stadium	69,044	Recap
6	October 13	at Denver Broncos	**L** 17–20	1–5	Mile High Stadium	74,657	Recap
7	October 19	**St. Louis Cardinals**	**W** 23–0	2–5	RFK Stadium	51,060	Recap
8	October 26	New Orleans Saints	**W** 22–14	3–5	RFK Stadium	51,375	Recap
9	November 2	Minnesota Vikings	**L** 14–39	3–6	RFK Stadium	52,060	Recap
10	November 9	at Chicago Bears	**L** 21–35	3–7	Soldier Field	57,159	Recap
11	November 16	**Philadelphia Eagles**	**L** 0–24	3–8	RFK Stadium	51,897	Recap
12	November 23	at **Dallas Cowboys**	**L** 10–14	3–9	Texas Stadium	58,809	Recap
13	November 30	at Atlanta Falcons	**L** 6–10	3–10	Atlanta–Fulton County Stadium	55,665	Recap
14	December 7	San Diego Chargers	**W** 40–17	4–10	RFK Stadium	48,556	Recap
15	December 13	**New York Giants**	**W** 16–13	5–10	RFK Stadium	44,443	Recap
16	December 21	at **St. Louis Cardinals**	**W** 31–7	6–10	Busch Memorial Stadium	35,942	Recap
Note: Intra-division opponents are in **bold** text.

=== Season summary ===
==== Week 1 vs Cowboys ====
Week One: Dallas Cowboys (0–0) at Washington Redskins (0–0)

Quarter	1	2	3	4	Total
**Cowboys**	7	3	0	7	**17**
Redskins	0	0	0	3	**3**

at RFK Stadium, Washington, D.C.

- Date: September 8
- Game time: 9:00 p.m. EST
- Game weather: 78 °F (26 °C)
- Game attendance: 55,045
- Referee: Gene Barth
- TV announcers (ABC): Frank Gifford, Don Meredith, and Howard Cosell
- Box Score

Game information

**First quarter**

- DAL – Tony Dorsett 6-yard run (Rafael Septien kick). Cowboys 7–0. Drive:

**Second quarter**

- DAL – Rafael Septien 19-yard field goal. Cowboys 10–0. Drive:

**Third quarter**

- No scoring

**Fourth quarter**

- WSH – Mark Moseley 45-yard field goal. Cowboys 10–3. Drive:
- DAL – Ron Springs 4-yard run (Rafael Septien kick). Cowboys 17–3. Drive:

Top passers

- DAL – Danny White – 10/18, 107 yards, 2 INT
- WSH – Joe Theismann – 19/34, 190 yards, INT

Top rushers

- DAL – Tony Dorsett – 17 rushes, 66 yards, TD
- WSH – Clarence Harmon – 7 rushes, 39 yards

Top receivers

- DAL – Tony Hill – 3 receptions, 69 yards
- WSH – Clarence Harmon – 7 receptions, 67 yards

==== Week 2 at Giants ====
Week Two: Washington Redskins (0–1) at New York Giants (1–0)

Quarter	1	2	3	4	Total
**Redskins**	6	14	0	3	**23**
Giants	0	14	0	7	**21**

at Giants Stadium, East Rutherford, New Jersey

- Game time: 4:00 p.m.
- Game weather: 74 °F (23 °C)
- Game attendance: 73,343
- Box Score

Game information

**First quarter**

- WSH – Clarence Harmon 20-yard pass from Joe Theismann (kick failed). Redskins 6–0. Drive:

**Second quarter**

- NYG – Mike Hogan 1-yard run (Joe Danelo kick). Giants 7–6. Drive:
- WSH – Joe Theismann 37-yard run (Mark Moseley kick). Redskins 13–7. Drive:
- NYG – Alvin Garrett 32-yard pass from Phil Simms (Joe Danelo kick). Giants 14–13. Drive:
- WSH – Wilbur Jackson 2-yard run (Mark Moseley kick). Redskins 20–14. Drive:

**Third quarter**

- No scoring

**Fourth quarter**

- NYG – Tom Mullady 35-yard pass from Phil Simms (Joe Danelo kick). Giants 21–20. Drive:
- WSH – Mark Moseley 45-yard field goal. Redskins 23–21. Drive:

Top passers

- WSH – Joe Theismann – 10/21, 120 yards, TD
- NYG – Phil Simms – 12/29, 174 yards, 2 TD, 3 INT

Top rushers

- WSH – Rickey Claitt – 15 rushes, 77 yards
- NYG – Larry Heater – 15 rushes, 57 yards

Top receivers

- WSH – Wilbur Jackson – 1 reception, 22 yards
- NYG – Earnest Gray – 7 receptions, 63 yards

=== Standings ===
NFC East
	W	L	T	PCT	DIV	CONF	PF	PA	STK
^{(2)} Philadelphia Eagles	12	4	0	.750	6–2	9–3	384	222	L1
^{(4)} Dallas Cowboys	12	4	0	.750	6–2	9–3	454	311	W1
Washington Redskins	6	10	0	.375	4–4	5–7	261	293	W3
St. Louis Cardinals	5	11	0	.313	2–6	4–10	299	350	L2
New York Giants	4	12	0	.250	2–6	3–9	249	425	L2
