= 1979 Washington Redskins season =

NFL team season

- Owner: Jack Kent Cooke
- General manager: Bobby Beathard
- President: Edward Bennett Williams
- Head coach: Jack Pardee
- Offensive coordinator: Joe Walton
- Defensive coordinator: Doc Urich
- Home stadium: RFK Stadium

Results
- Record: 10–6
- Division place: 3rd NFC East
- Playoffs: Did not qualify

The 1979 Washington Redskins season was the franchise's 48th season in the National Football League. The team improved on their 8–8 record from 1978, finishing 10–6. Although the Redskins were able to improve their record, they were eliminated from playoff contention on the final week of the season after facing the Dallas Cowboys with the NFC East title on the line. Cowboys quarterback Roger Staubach led a last-minute comeback to defeat Washington 35–34 to win the division, which, combined with the Chicago Bears defeating the St. Louis Cardinals 42–6, resulted in the Redskins losing a points tiebreaker for the final wild-card slot.

The Redskins adopted new uniforms this season, retiring the gold pants in favor of separate burgundy and white pants to be worn with the white and burgundy jerseys, respectively. Smaller changes were made to the jerseys and socks as well. This uniform set would be worn for all three of the franchise's Super Bowl victories to date and were relatively unchanged until the team changed its name for the 2020 season.

== Offseason ==
=== NFL draft ===
1979 Washington Redskins draft
| Round | Pick | Player | Position | College | Notes |
| 4 | 103 | Don Warren | Tight end | San Diego State | |
| 7 | 182 | Rich Milot | Linebacker | Penn State | |
| 9 | 233 | Kris Haines | Wide receiver | Notre Dame | |
| 11 | 289 | Monte Coleman | Linebacker | Central Arkansas | |
| 11 | 300 | Tony Hall | Wide receiver | Knoxville | |
Made roster

=== Undrafted free agents ===
1979 undrafted free agents of note
| Player | Position | College |
|---|---|---|
| Willie Banks | Linebacker | Penn State |
| Willie Blasher | linebacker | Oregon |
| Charley Bloxsom | Guard | Miami (FL) |
| James Willie Brown | Tackle | Louisville |
| Antonio Castle | Wide receiver | Eastern New Mexico |
| Ronnie Cullins | Cornerback | Colorado |
| Darryl Drake | Wide receiver | Western Kentucky |
| Phil DuBois | Tight End | San Diego State |
| Ricky Dunaway | Safety | Tulane |
| Keith Ellis | Wide receiver | New Mexico |
| Tony Hernandez | Defensive back | BYU |
| Neal Olkewicz | Linebacker | Maryland |
| Louis Orlando III | Center | Yale |
| Pedro Posadas | Kicker | Louisville |
| Jonathan Sutton | Safety | New Mexico |
| Ray Waddy | Cornerback | Texas A&I |
| Jimmy Jaye Wells | Center | Wisconsin–Superior |
| Dale White | Defensive tackle | Arkansas |
| Anthony Young | Safety | Jackson State |

== Personnel ==
=== Staff ===
1979 Washington Redskins staff
| Front office: President – Edward Bennett Williams; Vice president – Jack Kent Cooke; General manager – Bobby Beathard; Executive assistant to the President – Bobby Mitchell; Assistant general manager – Joel Margolis; Assistant general manager – Dick Meyers; Director of player personnel – Mike Allman; Director of pro scouting – Kirk Mee; Director of college scouting – Dick Daniels; Scouts – Charley Casserly, Charley Taylor; Head coaches: Head Coach – Jack Pardee; Special Assistant to Head Coach – Bob Bowser; Offensive coaches: Offensive Coordinator – Joe Walton; Running Backs – Fred O'Connor; Tight Ends – John Hilton; Offensive Line – Ray Callahan | Defensive coaches: Defensive Coordinator/Defensive Line – Doc Urich; Linebackers – George Dickson; Defensive Secondary – Richie Petitbon; Special teams coaches: Special Teams – John Hilton |

=== Roster ===
1979 Washington Redskins roster
| Quarterbacks (QB): 11 Kim McQuilken; 12 Fred Mortensen; 7 Joe Theismann; Running backs (RB): 30 Ike Forte; 34 Bobby Hammond; 38 Clarence Harmon; 25 Benny Malone; 44 John Riggins; Wide receivers (WR): 88 Danny Buggs; 80 John McDaniel; 83 Ricky Thompson; Tight ends (TE): 86 Phil DuBois; 84 Jean Fugett; 89 Grady Richardson; 85 Don Warren | Offensive linemen (OL): 63 Fred Dean G; 67 Greg Dubinetz T; 66 Ted Fritsch C; 75 Terry Hermeling T; 54 Bob Kuziel C; 64 Ron Saul G; 74 George Starke T; 73 Jeff Williams G; Defensive linemen (DL): 79 Coy Bacon DE; 69 Perry Brooks DT; 65 Dave Butz DT; 82 Dallas Hickman DE; 77 Joe Jones DE; 71 Karl Lorch DE; 78 Paul Smith DT; 72 Diron Talbert DT | Linebackers (LB): 51 Monte Coleman OLB; 59 Brad Dusek OLB; 58 Don Hover MLB; 57 Rich Milot OLB; 52 Neal Olkewicz MLB; 50 Pete Wysocki OLB; Defensive backs (DB): 26 Don Harris SS; 20 Joe Lavender CB; 29 Mark Murphy FS; 24 Lemar Parrish CB; 23 Tony Peters SS; 47 Ray Waddy CB; Special teams (ST): 4 Mike Bragg P; 3 Mark Moseley K | Reserve: 60 Gary Anderson G (IR); -- Mike Gibbons T (IR); 22 Buddy Hardeman RB (IR); 27 Ken Houston S (IR); -- Tom Milanovich DE (IR); 62 Dan Nugent G (IR); 40 Don Testerman FB (IR); Rookies in italics |

== Preseason ==
| Week | Date | Opponent | Result | Record | Game site | Attendance |
|---|---|---|---|---|---|---|
| 1 | August 4 | at Tampa Bay Buccaneers | W 9–7 | 1–0 | Tampa Stadium | 64,493 |
| 2 | August 11 | at Denver Broncos | L 6–13 | 1–1 | Mile High Stadium | 58,799 |
| 3 | August 18 | at Atlanta Falcons | W 16–6 | 2–1 | Atlanta-Fulton County Stadium | 52,478 |
| 4 | August 24 | Cleveland Browns | L 9–21 | 2–2 | RFK Stadium | 40,039 |

== Regular season ==
=== Schedule ===
| Week | Date | Opponent | Result | Record | Game site | Attendance | Recap |
|---|---|---|---|---|---|---|---|
| 1 | September 2 | Houston Oilers | **L** 27–29 | 0–1 | RFK Stadium | 54,582 | Recap |
| 2 | September 9 | at Detroit Lions | **W** 27–24 | 1–1 | Pontiac Silverdome | 54,991 | Recap |
| 3 | September 17 | **New York Giants** | **W** 27–0 | 2–1 | RFK Stadium | 54,672 | Recap |
| 4 | September 23 | at **St. Louis Cardinals** | **W** 17–7 | 3–1 | Busch Memorial Stadium | 50,680 | Recap |
| 5 | September 30 | at Atlanta Falcons | **W** 16–7 | 4–1 | Atlanta-Fulton County Stadium | 56,819 | Recap |
| 6 | October 7 | at **Philadelphia Eagles** | **L** 17–28 | 4–2 | Veterans Stadium | 69,142 | Recap |
| 7 | October 14 | at Cleveland Browns | **W** 13–9 | 5–2 | Cleveland Stadium | 63,323 | Recap |
| 8 | October 21 | **Philadelphia Eagles** | **W** 17–7 | 6–2 | RFK Stadium | 54,442 | Recap |
| 9 | October 28 | New Orleans Saints | **L** 10–14 | 6–3 | RFK Stadium | 52,133 | Recap |
| 10 | November 4 | at Pittsburgh Steelers | **L** 7–38 | 6–4 | Three Rivers Stadium | 49,462 | Recap |
| 11 | November 11 | **St. Louis Cardinals** | **W** 30–28 | 7–4 | RFK Stadium | 50,868 | Recap |
| 12 | November 18 | **Dallas Cowboys** | **W** 34–20 | 8–4 | RFK Stadium | 55,031 | Recap |
| 13 | November 25 | at **New York Giants** | **L** 6–14 | 8–5 | Giants Stadium | 72,641 | Recap |
| 14 | December 2 | Green Bay Packers | **W** 38–21 | 9–5 | RFK Stadium | 51,682 | Recap |
| 15 | December 9 | Cincinnati Bengals | **W** 28–14 | 10–5 | RFK Stadium | 52,882 | Recap |
| 16 | December 16 | at **Dallas Cowboys** | **L** 34–35 | 10–6 | Texas Stadium | 62,867 | Recap |
Note: Intra-division opponents are in **bold** text.

== Game summaries ==
=== Week 1: vs. Houston Oilers ===
Week 1: Houston Oilers at Washington Redskins

| Quarter | 1 | 2 | 3 | 4 | Total |
|---|---|---|---|---|---|
| Oilers | 6 | 0 | 7 | 16 | 29 |
| Redskins | 0 | 17 | 7 | 3 | 27 |

at RFK Stadium • Washington, D.C.

- Date: September 2, 1979
- Game time: 1:00 p.m.
- Game attendance: 54,582
- Referee: Gordon McCarter
- TV announcers (NBC): Jim Simpson and John Brodie
- Pro-Football-Reference.com

Game information

Oilers

- Dan Pastorini
  12/30, 176 Yds, TD, 3 INT
- Earl Campbell
  32 Rush, 166 Yds, 2 TD
- Billy Johnson
  4 Rec, 76 Yds, TD

Redskins

- Joe Theismann
  7/14, 123 Yds, 2 TD, INT
- Benny Malone
  17 Rush, 58 Yds, TD
- Jean Fugett
  3 Rec, 55 Yds, 2 TD

Scoring summary

| Quarter | Time | Drive | | | Team | Scoring information | Score | |
| Quarter | Time | Plays | Yards | TOP | Team | Scoring information | HOU | WSH |
|---|---|---|---|---|---|---|---|---|
| 1 | | | | | Oilers | 41-yard field goal by Fritsch | 3 | 0 |
| 1 | | | | | Oilers | 46-yard field goal by Fritsch | 6 | 0 |
| 2 | | | | | Redskins | 27-yard field goal by Moseley | 6 | 3 |
| 2 | | | | | Redskins | Fugett 8-yard touchdown reception from Theismann, Moseley kick good | 6 | 10 |
| 2 | | | | | Redskins | Malone 1-yard touchdown run, Moseley kick good | 6 | 17 |
| 3 | | | | | Oilers | Campbell 13-yard touchdown run, Fritsch kick good | 13 | 17 |
| 3 | | | | | Redskins | Fugett 30-yard touchdown reception from Theismann, Moseley kick good | 13 | 24 |
| 4 | | | | | Redskins | 39-yard field goal by Moseley | 13 | 27 |
| 4 | | | | | Oilers | Johnson 14-yard touchdown reception from Pastorini, Fritsch kick no good | 19 | 27 |
| 4 | | | | | Oilers | 26-yard field goal by Fritsch | 22 | 27 |
| 4 | | | | | Oilers | Campbell 3-yard touchdown run, Fritsch kick good | 29 | 27 |
| "TOP" = time of possession. For other American football terms, see Glossary of American football. | | | | | | | 29 | 27 |

=== Week 2: at Detroit Lions ===
Week 2: Washington Redskins at Detroit Lions

| Quarter | 1 | 2 | 3 | 4 | Total |
|---|---|---|---|---|---|
| Redskins | 0 | 17 | 7 | 3 | 27 |
| Lions | 3 | 0 | 0 | 21 | 24 |

at Pontiac Silverdome • Pontiac, Michigan

- Date: September 9, 1979
- Game time: 1:00 p.m.
- Game weather: Indoors (dome)
- Game attendance: 54,991
- Referee: Gene Barth
- TV announcers (CBS): Frank Glieber and Sonny Jurgensen
- Pro-Football-Reference.com

Game information

Redskins

Lions

Scoring summary

| Quarter | Time | Drive | | | Team | Scoring information | Score | |
| Quarter | Time | Plays | Yards | TOP | Team | Scoring information | WSH | DET |
|---|---|---|---|---|---|---|---|---|
| 1 | | | | | Lions | 27-yard field goal by Ricardo | 0 | 3 |
| 2 | | | | | Redskins | Thompson 8-yard touchdown reception from Theismann, Moseley kick good | 7 | 3 |
| 2 | | | | | Redskins | 35-yard field goal by Moseley | 10 | 3 |
| 2 | | | | | Redskins | Malone 5-yard touchdown run, Moseley kick good | 17 | 3 |
| 3 | | | | | Redskins | Fugett 3-yard touchdown reception from Theismann, Moseley kick good | 24 | 3 |
| 4 | | | | | Lions | Robinson 2-yard touchdown run, Ricardo kick good | 24 | 10 |
| 4 | | | | | Lions | Kane 12-yard touchdown run, Ricardo kick good | 24 | 17 |
| 4 | | | | | Lions | Scott 24-yard touchdown reception from Komlo, Ricardo kick good | 24 | 24 |
| 4 | | | | | Redskins | 41-yard field goal by Moseley | 27 | 24 |
| "TOP" = time of possession. For other American football terms, see Glossary of American football. | | | | | | | 27 | 24 |

=== Week 3: vs. New York Giants ===
Week 3: New York Giants at Washington Redskins

| Quarter | 1 | 2 | 3 | 4 | Total |
|---|---|---|---|---|---|
| Giants | 0 | 0 | 0 | 0 | 0 |
| Redskins | 3 | 14 | 7 | 3 | 27 |

at RFK Stadium • Washington, D.C.

- Date: September 17, 1979
- Game time: 9:00 p.m.
- Game attendance: 54,672
- Referee: Ben Dreith
- TV announcers (ABC): Frank Gifford, Howard Cosell and Fran Tarkenton
- Pro-Football-Reference.com

Game information

Giants

Redskins

Scoring summary

| Quarter | Time | Drive | | | Team | Scoring information | Score | |
| Quarter | Time | Plays | Yards | TOP | Team | Scoring information | NYG | WSH |
|---|---|---|---|---|---|---|---|---|
| 1 | | | | | Redskins | 46-yard field goal by Moseley | 0 | 3 |
| 2 | | — | — | — | Redskins | Interception returned 31 yards for touchdown by Lorch, Moseley kick good | 0 | 10 |
| 2 | | | | | Redskins | Harmon 4-yard touchdown reception from Theismann, Moseley kick good | 0 | 17 |
| 3 | | | | | Redskins | Theismann 7-yard touchdown run, Moseley kick good | 0 | 24 |
| 1 | | | | | Redskins | 40-yard field goal by Moseley | 0 | 27 |
| "TOP" = time of possession. For other American football terms, see Glossary of American football. | | | | | | | 0 | 27 |

=== Week 4: at St. Louis Cardinals ===
Week 4: Washington Redskins at St. Louis Cardinals

| Quarter | 1 | 2 | 3 | 4 | Total |
|---|---|---|---|---|---|
| Redskins | 14 | 0 | 0 | 3 | 17 |
| Cardinals | 0 | 0 | 7 | 0 | 7 |

at Busch Memorial Stadium • St. Louis, Missouri

- Date: September 23, 1979
- Game time: 2:00 p.m.
- Game attendance: 50,680
- Referee: Red Cashion
- TV announcers (CBS): Gary Bender and Sonny Jurgensen
- Pro-Football-Reference.com

Game information

Redskins

Cardinals

Scoring summary

| Quarter | Time | Drive | | | Team | Scoring information | Score | |
| Quarter | Time | Plays | Yards | TOP | Team | Scoring information | WSH | STL |
|---|---|---|---|---|---|---|---|---|
| 1 | | — | — | — | Redskins | Fumble recovery returned 0 yards for touchdown by Hover, Moseley kick good | 7 | 0 |
| 1 | | | | | Redskins | Hardeman 41-yard touchdown reception from Theismann, Moseley kick good | 14 | 0 |
| 3 | | | | | Eagles | Brown 1-yard touchdown run, Little kick good | 14 | 7 |
| 4 | | | | | Redskins | 47-yard field goal by Moseley | 17 | 7 |
| "TOP" = time of possession. For other American football terms, see Glossary of American football. | | | | | | | 17 | 7 |

=== Week 5: at Atlanta Falcons ===
Week 5: Washington Redskins at Atlanta Falcons

| Quarter | 1 | 2 | 3 | 4 | Total |
|---|---|---|---|---|---|
| Redskins | 3 | 10 | 3 | 0 | 16 |
| Falcons | 7 | 0 | 0 | 0 | 7 |

at Atlanta-Fulton County Stadium • Atlanta, Georgia

- Date: September 30, 1979
- Game time: 1:00 p.m.
- Game attendance: 56,819
- Referee: Dick Jorgensen
- TV announcers (CBS): Curt Gowdy and Hank Stram
- Pro-Football-Reference.com

Game information

Redskins

Falcons

Scoring summary

| Quarter | Time | Drive | | | Team | Scoring information | Score | |
| Quarter | Time | Plays | Yards | TOP | Team | Scoring information | WSH | ATL |
|---|---|---|---|---|---|---|---|---|
| 1 | | | | | Redskins | 45-yard field goal by Moseley | 3 | 0 |
| 1 | | | | | Falcons | Andrews 2-yard touchdown run, Mazzetti kick good | 3 | 7 |
| 2 | | | | | Redskins | 53-yard field goal by Moseley | 6 | 7 |
| 2 | | | | | Redskins | Riggins 1-yard touchdown run, Moseley kick good | 13 | 7 |
| 3 | | | | | Redskins | 37-yard field goal by Moseley | 16 | 7 |
| "TOP" = time of possession. For other American football terms, see Glossary of American football. | | | | | | | 16 | 7 |

=== Week 6: at Philadelphia Eagles ===
Week 6: Washington Redskins at Philadelphia Eagles

| Quarter | 1 | 2 | 3 | 4 | Total |
|---|---|---|---|---|---|
| Redskins | 0 | 7 | 0 | 10 | 17 |
| Eagles | 7 | 7 | 14 | 0 | 28 |

at Veterans Stadium • Philadelphia, Pennsylvania

- Date: October 7, 1979
- Game time: 1:00 p.m.
- Game attendance: 69,142
- Referee: Jerry Markbreit
- TV announcers (CBS): Gary Bender and Sonny Jurgensen
- Pro-Football-Reference.com

Game information

Redskins

Eagles

Scoring summary

| Quarter | Time | Drive | | | Team | Scoring information | Score | |
| Quarter | Time | Plays | Yards | TOP | Team | Scoring information | WSH | PHI |
|---|---|---|---|---|---|---|---|---|
| 1 | | | | | Eagles | Montgomery 8-yard touchdown run, Franklin kick good | 0 | 7 |
| 2 | | | | | Eagles | Montgomery 11-yard touchdown reception from Jaworski, Franklin kick good | 0 | 14 |
| 2 | | | | | Redskins | Riggins 4-yard touchdown reception from Theismann, Moseley kick good | 7 | 14 |
| 3 | | | | | Eagles | Montgomery 5-yard touchdown run, Franklin kick good | 7 | 21 |
| 3 | | | | | Eagles | Montgomery 4-yard touchdown run, Franklin kick good | 7 | 28 |
| 4 | | | | | Redskins | 37-yard field goal by Moseley | 10 | 28 |
| 4 | | | | | Redskins | Riggins 1-yard touchdown run, Moseley kick good | 17 | 28 |
| "TOP" = time of possession. For other American football terms, see Glossary of American football. | | | | | | | 17 | 28 |

=== Week 7: at Cleveland Browns ===
Week 7: Washington Redskins at Cleveland Browns

| Quarter | 1 | 2 | 3 | 4 | Total |
|---|---|---|---|---|---|
| Redskins | 0 | 3 | 3 | 7 | 13 |
| Browns | 0 | 6 | 3 | 0 | 9 |

at Cleveland Stadium • Cleveland, Ohio

- Date: October 14, 1979
- Game time: 1:00 p.m.
- Game attendance: 63,323
- Referee: Jerry Seeman
- TV announcers (CBS): Frank Glieber and George Allen
- Pro-Football-Reference.com

Game information

Redskins

- Joe Theismann
  14/24, 233 Yds, TD, INT
- John Riggins
  13 Rush, 31 Yds
- Clarence Harmon
  4 Rec, 60 Yds, TD

Browns

- Brian Sipe
  13/25, 160 Yds, INT
- Mike Pruitt
  22 Rush, 85 Yds
- Dave Logan
  5 Rec, 97 Yds

Scoring summary

| Quarter | Time | Drive | | | Team | Scoring information | Score | |
| Quarter | Time | Plays | Yards | TOP | Team | Scoring information | WSH | CLE |
|---|---|---|---|---|---|---|---|---|
| 2 | | | | | Redskins | 35-yard field goal by Moseley | 3 | 0 |
| 2 | | | | | Browns | Hill 1-yard touchdown run, Cockroft kick no good (blocked) | 3 | 6 |
| 3 | | | | | Redskins | 17-yard field goal by Moseley | 6 | 6 |
| 3 | | | | | Browns | 37-yard field goal by Cockroft | 6 | 9 |
| 4 | | | | | Redskins | Harmon 15-yard touchdown reception from Theismann, Moseley kick good | 13 | 9 |
| "TOP" = time of possession. For other American football terms, see Glossary of American football. | | | | | | | 13 | 9 |

=== Week 8: vs. Philadelphia Eagles ===
Week 8: Philadelphia Eagles at Washington Redskins

| Quarter | 1 | 2 | 3 | 4 | Total |
|---|---|---|---|---|---|
| Eagles | 0 | 0 | 0 | 7 | 7 |
| Redskins | 0 | 7 | 7 | 3 | 17 |

at RFK Stadium • Washington, D.C.

- Date: October 21, 1979
- Game time: 1:00 p.m.
- Game attendance: 54,442
- Referee: Chuck Heberling
- TV announcers (CBS): Vin Scully and George Allen
- Pro-Football-Reference.com

Game information

Eagles

Redskins

Scoring summary

| Quarter | Time | Drive | | | Team | Scoring information | Score | |
| Quarter | Time | Plays | Yards | TOP | Team | Scoring information | PHI | WSH |
|---|---|---|---|---|---|---|---|---|
| 2 | | | | | Redskins | Malone 10-yard touchdown run, Moseley kick good | 0 | 7 |
| 3 | | | | | Redskins | Theismann 1-yard touchdown run, Moseley kick good | 0 | 14 |
| 4 | | | | | Redskins | 23-yard field goal by Moseley | 0 | 17 |
| 4 | | | | | Eagles | Krepfle 40-yard touchdown reception from Jaworski, Franklin kick good | 7 | 17 |
| "TOP" = time of possession. For other American football terms, see Glossary of American football. | | | | | | | 7 | 17 |

=== Week 9: vs. New Orleans Saints ===
Week 9: New Orleans Saints at Washington Redskins

| Quarter | 1 | 2 | 3 | 4 | Total |
|---|---|---|---|---|---|
| Saints | 7 | 7 | 0 | 0 | 14 |
| Redskins | 3 | 7 | 0 | 0 | 10 |

at RFK Stadium • Washington, D.C.

- Date: October 28, 1979
- Game time: 1:00 p.m.
- Game attendance: 55,031
- Referee: Fred Wyant
- TV announcers (CBS): Gary Bender and Sonny Jurgensen
- Pro-Football-Reference.com

Game information

Saints

Redskins

Scoring summary

| Quarter | Time | Drive | | | Team | Scoring information | Score | |
| Quarter | Time | Plays | Yards | TOP | Team | Scoring information | NO | WSH |
|---|---|---|---|---|---|---|---|---|
| 1 | | | | | Saints | Chandler 45-yard touchdown reception from Manning, Yepremian kick good | 7 | 0 |
| 1 | | | | | Redskins | 18-yard field goal by Moseley | 7 | 3 |
| 2 | | | | | Saints | Galbreath 1-yard touchdown run, Yepremian kick good | 14 | 3 |
| 2 | | | | | Redskins | Theismann 1-yard touchdown run, Moseley kick good | 14 | 10 |
| "TOP" = time of possession. For other American football terms, see Glossary of American football. | | | | | | | 14 | 10 |

=== Week 10: at Pittsburgh Steelers ===
Week 10: Washington Redskins at Pittsburgh Steelers

| Quarter | 1 | 2 | 3 | 4 | Total |
|---|---|---|---|---|---|
| Redskins | 0 | 7 | 0 | 0 | 7 |
| Steelers | 7 | 17 | 7 | 7 | 38 |

at Three Rivers Stadium • Pittsburgh, Pennsylvania

- Date: November 4, 1979
- Game time: 1:00 p.m.
- Game weather: 53 °F (12 °C), (Sunny) wind 7 mph (11 km/h)
- Game attendance: 49,462
- Referee: Gordon McCarter
- TV announcers (CBS): Curt Gowdy and Hank Stram
- Pro-Football-Reference.com

Game information

Redskins

- Joe Theismann
  14/31, 147 Yds, INT
- John Riggins
  13 Rush, 56 Yds, TD
- Danny Buggs
  3 Rec, 37 Yds

Steelers

- Terry Bradshaw
  15/27, 311 Yds, 4 TD, INT
- Franco Harris
  15 Rush, 62 Yds
- John Stallworth
  6 Rec, 126 Yds, 2 TD

Scoring summary

| Quarter | Time | Drive | | | Team | Scoring information | Score | |
| Quarter | Time | Plays | Yards | TOP | Team | Scoring information | WSH | PIT |
|---|---|---|---|---|---|---|---|---|
| 1 | | | | | Steelers | Stallworth 11-yard touchdown reception from Bradshaw, Bahr kick good | 0 | 7 |
| 2 | | | | | Redskins | Riggins 4-yard touchdown run, Moseley kick good | 7 | 7 |
| 2 | | | | | Steelers | 21-yard field goal by Bahr | 7 | 10 |
| 2 | | | | | Steelers | Cunningham 16-yard touchdown reception from Bradshaw, Bahr kick good | 7 | 17 |
| 2 | | | | | Steelers | Grossman 4-yard touchdown reception from Bradshaw, Bahr kick good | 7 | 24 |
| 3 | | | | | Steelers | Stallworth 65-yard touchdown reception from Bradshaw, Bahr kick good | 7 | 31 |
| 4 | | | | | Steelers | Moser 2-yard touchdown run, Bahr kick good | 7 | 38 |
| "TOP" = time of possession. For other American football terms, see Glossary of American football. | | | | | | | 7 | 38 |

=== Week 11: vs. St. Louis Cardinals ===
Week 11: St. Louis Cardinals at Washington Redskins

| Quarter | 1 | 2 | 3 | 4 | Total |
|---|---|---|---|---|---|
| Cardinals | 7 | 0 | 0 | 21 | 28 |
| Redskins | 7 | 10 | 3 | 10 | 30 |

at RFK Stadium • Washington, D.C.

- Date: November 11, 1979
- Game time: 1:00 p.m.
- Game attendance: 50,868
- Referee: Ben Dreith
- TV announcers (CBS): Gary Bender and Sonny Jurgensen
- Pro-Football-Reference.com

Game information

Cardinals

Redskins

Scoring summary

| Quarter | Time | Drive | | | Team | Scoring information | Score | |
| Quarter | Time | Plays | Yards | TOP | Team | Scoring information | STL | WSH |
|---|---|---|---|---|---|---|---|---|
| "TOP" = time of possession. For other American football terms, see Glossary of American football. | | | | | | | 28 | 30 |

=== Week 12: vs. Dallas Cowboys ===
Week 12: Dallas Cowboys at Washington Redskins

| Quarter | 1 | 2 | 3 | 4 | Total |
|---|---|---|---|---|---|
| Cowboys | 0 | 3 | 3 | 14 | 20 |
| Redskins | 7 | 7 | 10 | 10 | 34 |

at RFK Stadium • Washington, D.C.

- Date: November 18, 1979
- Game time: 1:00 p.m.
- Game attendance: 55,031
- Referee: Cal Lepore
- TV announcers (CBS): Pat Summerall and Tom Brookshier
- Pro-Football-Reference.com

Game information

Cowboys

Redskins

Scoring summary

| Quarter | Time | Drive | | | Team | Scoring information | Score | |
| Quarter | Time | Plays | Yards | TOP | Team | Scoring information | DAL | WSH |
|---|---|---|---|---|---|---|---|---|
| 1 | | | | | Redskins | McDaniel 4-yard touchdown reception from Theismann, Moseley kick good | 0 | 7 |
| 2 | | | | | Cowboys | 34-yard field goal by Septién | 3 | 7 |
| 2 | | | | | Redskins | Riggins 3-yard touchdown run, Moseley kick good | 3 | 14 |
| 3 | | | | | Cowboys | 37-yard field goal by Septién | 6 | 14 |
| 3 | | | | | Redskins | Harmon 10-yard touchdown reception from Theismann, Moseley kick good | 6 | 24 |
| 3 | | | | | Redskins | 46-yard field goal by Moseley | 6 | 24 |
| 4 | | | | | Cowboys | Pearson 19-yard touchdown reception from Staubach, Septién kick good | 13 | 24 |
| 4 | | | | | Redskins | Thompson 11-yard touchdown reception from Theismann, Moseley kick good | 13 | 31 |
| 4 | | | | | Cowboys | Pearson 9-yard touchdown reception from White, Septién kick good | 20 | 31 |
| 4 | | | | | Redskins | 45-yard field goal by Moseley | 20 | 34 |
| "TOP" = time of possession. For other American football terms, see Glossary of American football. | | | | | | | 20 | 34 |

=== Week 13: at New York Giants ===
Week 13: Washington Redskins at New York Giants

| Quarter | 1 | 2 | 3 | 4 | Total |
|---|---|---|---|---|---|
| Redskins | 0 | 3 | 3 | 0 | 6 |
| Giants | 7 | 0 | 0 | 7 | 14 |

at Giants Stadium • East Rutherford, New Jersey

- Date: November 25, 1979
- Game time: 1:00 p.m.
- Game attendance: 72,641
- Referee: Jerry Seeman
- TV announcers (CBS): Vin Scully and George Allen
- Pro-Football-Reference.com

Game information

Redskins

Giants

Scoring summary

| Quarter | Time | Drive | | | Team | Scoring information | Score | |
| Quarter | Time | Plays | Yards | TOP | Team | Scoring information | WSH | NYG |
|---|---|---|---|---|---|---|---|---|
| 1 | | | | | Giants | Kotar 1-yard touchdown run, Danelo kick good | 0 | 7 |
| 2 | | | | | Redskins | 21-yard field goal by Moseley | 3 | 7 |
| 3 | | | | | Redskins | 41-yard field goal by Moseley | 6 | 7 |
| 4 | | | | | Giants | Taylor 1-yard touchdown run, Danelo kick good | 6 | 14 |
| "TOP" = time of possession. For other American football terms, see Glossary of American football. | | | | | | | 6 | 14 |

=== Week 14: vs. Green Bay Packers ===
Week 14: Green Bay Packers at Washington Redskins

| Quarter | 1 | 2 | 3 | 4 | Total |
|---|---|---|---|---|---|
| Packers | 0 | 21 | 0 | 0 | 21 |
| Redskins | 7 | 0 | 7 | 24 | 38 |

at RFK Stadium • Washington, D.C.

- Date: December 2, 1979
- Game time: 1:00 p.m.
- Game weather: 39 °F or 3.9 °C, relative humidity 55%, wind 15 miles per hour (24 km/h; 13 kn), wind chill 31 °F or −0.6 °C
- Game attendance: 51,682
- Referee: Chuck Heberling
- TV announcers (CBS): Vin Scully and George Allen
- Pro-Football-Reference.com

Game information

Packers

Redskins

Scoring summary

| Quarter | Time | Drive | | | Team | Scoring information | Score | |
| Quarter | Time | Plays | Yards | TOP | Team | Scoring information | GB | WSH |
|---|---|---|---|---|---|---|---|---|
| 1 | | | | | Redskins | Thompson 20-yard touchdown reception from Theismann, Moseley kick good | 0 | 7 |
| 2 | | | | | Packers | Tullis 52-yard touchdown reception from Dickey, Birney kick good | 7 | 7 |
| 2 | | | | | Packers | Simpson 2-yard touchdown run, Birney kick good | 14 | 7 |
| 2 | | | | | Packers | Thompson 43-yard touchdown reception from Dickey, Birney kick good | 21 | 7 |
| 3 | | | | | Redskins | Buggs 8-yard touchdown reception from Theismann, Moseley kick good | 21 | 14 |
| 4 | | | | | Redskins | McDaniel 39-yard touchdown reception from Theismann, Moseley kick good | 21 | 21 |
| 4 | | | | | Redskins | Riggins 12-yard touchdown reception from Theismann, Moseley kick good | 21 | 28 |
| 4 | | | | | Redskins | 33-yard field goal by Moseley | 21 | 31 |
| 4 | | | | | Redskins | Forte 20-yard touchdown run, Moseley kick good | 21 | 38 |
| "TOP" = time of possession. For other American football terms, see Glossary of American football. | | | | | | | 21 | 38 |

This would prove the last time the Green Bay Packers would ever play at RFK Stadium before its closure in 1997: in fact, the Packers would not play an away game against the Redskins again until 2004. This occurred because between 1978 and the admission of the Texans in 2002, non-division conference matchups had no rotation but were entirely based upon previous season’s standings.

=== Week 15: vs. Cincinnati Bengals ===
Week 15: Cincinnati Bengals at Washington Redskins

| Quarter | 1 | 2 | 3 | 4 | Total |
|---|---|---|---|---|---|
| Bengals | 14 | 0 | 0 | 0 | 14 |
| Redskins | 7 | 14 | 0 | 7 | 28 |

at RFK Stadium • Washington, D.C.

- Date: December 9, 1979
- Game time: 1:00 p.m.
- Game attendance: 52,882
- Referee: Pat Haggerty
- TV announcers (NBC): Sam Nover and Bob Trumpy
- Pro-Football-Reference.com

Game information

Bengals

Redskins

Scoring summary

| Quarter | Time | Drive | | | Team | Scoring information | Score | |
| Quarter | Time | Plays | Yards | TOP | Team | Scoring information | CIN | WSH |
|---|---|---|---|---|---|---|---|---|
| 1 | | | | | Bengals | Griffin 52-yard touchdown reception from Anderson, Bahr kick good | 7 | 0 |
| 1 | | | | | Redskins | Riggins 7-yard touchdown run, Moseley kick good | 7 | 7 |
| 1 | | | | | Bengals | Johnson 1-yard touchdown run, Bahr kick good | 14 | 7 |
| 2 | | | | | Redskins | Harmon 7-yard touchdown reception from Theismann, Moseley kick good | 14 | 14 |
| 2 | | | | | Redskins | Harmon 23-yard touchdown reception from Theismann, Moseley kick good | 14 | 21 |
| 4 | | | | | Redskins | Riggins 2-yard touchdown run, Moseley kick good | 14 | 28 |
| "TOP" = time of possession. For other American football terms, see Glossary of American football. | | | | | | | 14 | 28 |

=== Week 16: at Dallas Cowboys ===
Week Sixteen: Washington Redskins (10–5) at Dallas Cowboys (10–5)

| Quarter | 1 | 2 | 3 | 4 | Total |
|---|---|---|---|---|---|
| Redskins | 10 | 7 | 0 | 17 | 34 |
| Cowboys | 0 | 14 | 7 | 14 | 35 |

at Texas Stadium, Irving, Texas

- Date: December 16, 1979
- Game time: 4:00 p.m. EDT
- Game weather: 40 °F (4 °C)
- Game attendance: 62,867
- Referee: Bob Frederic
- TV announcers (CBS): Pat Summerall and Tom Brookshier
- Box Score

The loss knocked the Redskins out of the playoffs.

| Team | Category | Player | Statistics |
|---|---|---|---|
| Redskins | Passing | Joe Theismann | 12/23, 200 Yds, TD |
| Redskins | Rushing | John Riggins | 22 Rush, 151 Yds, 2 TD |
| Redskins | Receiving | Benny Malone | 1 Rec, 55 Yds, TD |
| Cowboys | Passing | Roger Staubach | 24/42, 326 Yds, 3 TD, INT |
| Cowboys | Rushing | Ron Springs | 20 Rush, 79 Yds, TD |
| Cowboys | Receiving | Tony Hill | 8 Rec, 113 Yds, TD |

Scoring summary

| Quarter | Time | Drive | | | Team | Scoring information | Score | |
| Quarter | Time | Plays | Yards | TOP | Team | Scoring information | WAS | DAL |
|---|---|---|---|---|---|---|---|---|
| 1 | | | | | Redskins | 24-yard field goal by Mark Moseley | 3 | 0 |
| 1 | | | | | Redskins | Joe Theismann 1-yard touchdown run, Mark Moseley kick good | 10 | 0 |
| 2 | | | | | Redskins | Benny Malone 55-yard touchdown reception from Joe Theismann, Mark Moseley kick good | 17 | 0 |
| 2 | | | | | Cowboys | Ron Springs 1-yard touchdown run, Rafael Septien kick good | 17 | 7 |
| 2 | | | | | Cowboys | Preston Pearson 26-yard touchdown reception from Roger Staubach, Rafael Septien kick good | 17 | 14 |
| 3 | | | | | Cowboys | Robert Newhouse 2-yard touchdown run, Rafael Septien kick good | 17 | 21 |
| 4 | | | | | Redskins | 24-yard field goal by Mark Moseley | 20 | 21 |
| 4 | | | | | Redskins | John Riggins 1-yard touchdown run, Mark Moseley kick good | 27 | 21 |
| 4 | 6:54 | | | | Redskins | John Riggins 66-yard touchdown run, Mark Moseley kick good | 34 | 21 |
| 4 | | | | | Cowboys | Ron Springs 26-yard touchdown reception from Roger Staubach, Rafael Septien kick good | 34 | 28 |
| 4 | 0:39 | | | | Cowboys | Tony Hill 8-yard touchdown reception from Roger Staubach, Rafael Septien kick good | 34 | 35 |
| "TOP" = time of possession. For other American football terms, see Glossary of American football. | | | | | | | 34 | 35 |

=== Standings ===
NFC East
| | W | L | T | PCT | DIV | CONF | PF | PA | STK |
|---|---|---|---|---|---|---|---|---|---|
| ^{(1)} Dallas Cowboys | 11 | 5 | 0 | .688 | 6–2 | 10–2 | 371 | 313 | W3 |
| ^{(4)} Philadelphia Eagles | 11 | 5 | 0 | .688 | 6–2 | 9–3 | 339 | 282 | W1 |
| Washington Redskins | 10 | 6 | 0 | .625 | 5–3 | 8–4 | 348 | 295 | L1 |
| New York Giants | 6 | 10 | 0 | .375 | 1–7 | 5–9 | 237 | 323 | L3 |
| St. Louis Cardinals | 5 | 11 | 0 | .313 | 2–6 | 4–8 | 307 | 358 | L1 |
