= 1978 Washington Redskins season =

47th season in franchise history, collapse after 6-0 start

- Owner: Edward Bennett Williams
- General manager: Bobby Beathard
- President: Edward Bennett Williams
- Head coach: Jack Pardee
- Offensive coordinator: Joe Walton
- Defensive coordinator: Doc Urich
- Home stadium: RFK Stadium

Results
- Record: 8–8
- Division place: 3rd NFC East
- Playoffs: Did not qualify

The 1978 Washington Redskins season was the franchise's 47th season in the National Football League (NFL) and their 42nd in Washington, D.C. The team failed to improve on their 9–5 record from 1977, finishing 8–8.

This was the first of Jack Pardee's three seasons as head coach of the Redskins. This was also the first season in which the NFL expanded from a 14-game season to a 16-game schedule. The Redskins started the season 6–0 and got to 8–3 but ended the season with a five-game losing streak and missed the playoffs. The losing streak began with a loss to a Cardinals team which had started 0–8. The Cardinals would not win again at RFK Stadium until 1993, their sixth season in Arizona. Quarterback Billy Kilmer, who served as backup to Joe Theismann, retired following the season.

== Offseason ==
=== NFL draft ===
1978 Washington Redskins draft
| Round | Selection | Player | Position | College |
|---|---|---|---|---|
| 6 | 159 | Tony Green | RB | Florida |
| 8 | 202 | Walker Lee | WR | North Carolina |
| 8 | 219 | Don Hover | LB | Washington State |
| 9 | 243 | John Hurley | QB | Santa Clara^{[d]} |
| 10 | 270 | Scott Hertenstein | DE | Azusa Pacific |
| 11 | 297 | Mike Williams | DB | Texas A&M |
| 12 | 324 | Steve McCabe | G | Bowdoin |

=== Undrafted free agents ===
1978 undrafted free agents of note
| Player | Position | College |
|---|---|---|
| Tim Ellis | Quarterback | Ole Miss |
| Danny Knott | Running back | Notre Dame |
| Cleo Montgomery | Wide receiver | Abilene Christian |
| George Roberts | Punter | Virginia Tech |
| Mike Sandusky | Guard/Tackle | Duke |
| Bill Siebolt | Defensive tackle | Boston College |
| J. T. Smith | Wide receiver | North Texas |
| Steve Wilson | Wide receiver | Angelo State |
| Billy Woods | Defensive back | Georgia |
| Mike Yeates | Guard | Maryland |

== Personnel ==
=== Staff / Coaches ===
1978 Washington Redskins staff
| Front office: Majority Owner / Vice President – Jack Kent Cooke; Minority Owner / President – Edward Bennett Williams; General manager – Bobby Beathard; Executive assistant to the President – Bobby Mitchell; Assistant general manager – Joel Margolis; Assistant general manager – Dick Meyers; Director of player personnel – C.A. Temerario; Director of pro scouting – Kirk Mee; Director of college scouting – Dick Daniels; Scouts – Mike Faulkiner; Head coaches: Head Coach – Jack Pardee; Special Assistant to Head Coach – Bob Bowser; Offensive coaches: Offensive Coordinator – Joe Walton; Running Backs – George Dickson; Tight Ends / Wide Receivers – John Hilton; Offensive Line – Ray Callahan | Defensive coaches: Defensive Coordinator/Defensive Line – Doc Urich; Linebackers – George Dickson; Defensive Secondary – Richie Petitbon; Special teams coaches: Special Teams Coach – John Hilton |

=== Final roster ===
1978 Washington Redskins roster
| Quarterbacks (QB): 17 Billy Kilmer; 11 Kim McQuilken; 7 Joe Theismann; Running backs (RB): 30 Ike Forte; 34 Tony Green; 38 Clarence Harmon; 25 Benny Malone; 44 John Riggins; 22 Mike Thomas; Wide receivers (WR): 81 Terry Anderson; 88 Danny Buggs; 86 John McDaniel; 83 Ricky Thompson; Tight ends (TE): 84 Jean Fugett; 89 Reggie Haynes | Offensive linemen (OL): 63 Fred Dean G; 66 Ted Fritsch C; 68 Jim Harlan T/G; 75 Terry Hermeling T; 54 Bob Kuziel C; 62 Dan Nugent G; 64 Ron Saul G; 73 Jeff Williams T; Defensive linemen (DL): 80 Coy Bacon DE; 69 Perry Brooks DT; 65 Dave Butz DT; 76 Bob Heinz DT; 82 Dallas Hickman DE; 71 Karl Lorch DE; 79 Ron McDole DE | Linebackers (LB): 32 Mike Curtis LB; 59 Brad Dusek OLB; 55 Chris Hanburger OLB; 58 Don Hover MLB; 53 Harold McLinton MLB; 50 Pete Wysocki OLB; Defensive backs (DB): 26 Don Harris SS; 27 Ken Houston SS; 20 Joe Lavender CB; 29 Mark Murphy FS; 24 Lemar Parrish CB; 13 Jake Scott FS; 45 Gerard Williams CB; Special teams (ST): 4 Mike Bragg P; 3 Mark Moseley K | Reserve: 77 Bill Brundige DT (IR); 36 Eddie Moss RB (IR); -- Chuck Rodgers CB (IR); 74 George Starke T (IR); 72 Diron Talbert DT (IR); Rookies in italics |

== Regular season ==
=== Schedule ===
| Week | Date | Opponent | Result | Record | Venue | Attendance | Recap |
|---|---|---|---|---|---|---|---|
| 1 | September 3 | at New England Patriots | **W** 16–14 | 1–0 | Schaefer Stadium | 55,037 | Recap |
| 2 | September 10 | **Philadelphia Eagles** | **W** 35–30 | 2–0 | RFK Stadium | 54,380 | Recap |
| 3 | September 17 | at **St. Louis Cardinals** | **W** 28–10 | 3–0 | Busch Memorial Stadium | 49,282 | Recap |
| 4 | September 24 | New York Jets | **W** 23–3 | 4–0 | RFK Stadium | 54,729 | Recap |
| 5 | October 2 | **Dallas Cowboys** | **W** 9–5 | 5–0 | RFK Stadium | 55,031 | Recap |
| 6 | October 8 | at Detroit Lions | **W** 21–19 | 6–0 | Pontiac Silverdome | 60,555 | Recap |
| 7 | October 15 | at **Philadelphia Eagles** | **L** 10–17 | 6–1 | Veterans Stadium | 65,722 | Recap |
| 8 | October 22 | at **New York Giants** | **L** 6–17 | 6–2 | Giants Stadium | 76,192 | Recap |
| 9 | October 29 | San Francisco 49ers | **W** 38–20 | 7–2 | RFK Stadium | 53,706 | Recap |
| 10 | November 6 | at Baltimore Colts | **L** 17–21 | 7–3 | Memorial Stadium | 57,631 | Recap |
| 11 | November 12 | **New York Giants** | **W** 16–13 | 8–3 | RFK Stadium | 53,271 | Recap |
| 12 | November 19 | **St. Louis Cardinals** | **L** 17–27 | 8–4 | RFK Stadium | 52,460 | Recap |
| 13 | November 23 | at **Dallas Cowboys** | **L** 10–37 | 8–5 | Texas Stadium | 64,905 | Recap |
| 14 | December 3 | Miami Dolphins | **L** 0–16 | 8–6 | RFK Stadium | 52,860 | Recap |
| 15 | December 10 | at Atlanta Falcons | **L** 17–20 | 8–7 | Atlanta–Fulton County Stadium | 54,178 | Recap |
| 16 | December 16 | Chicago Bears | **L** 10–14 | 8–8 | RFK Stadium | 49,774 | Recap |
Note: Intra-division opponents are in **bold** text.

=== Week 2 ===
- Referee: Fred Silva
- TV Network: CBS
- Announcers: Lindsey Nelson, Paul Hornung, Roman Gabriel

During the contest, and the fireworks began early as the Eagles' Wilbert Montgomery opened the scoring with a 34-yard touchdown run in the first period, but back came the Redskins as Joe Theismann who was to have another good game scores from the 4 to even the game. But the Eagles came back as a field goal by Nick Mike-Mayer from 32, but then it was the Redskins offensive show as the Redskins scored 21 unanswered points to take a commanding 28-10 lead. For the day, Theismann passed for 226 yards and 3 touchdown passes. Then both teams traded touchdowns to make it a 35-16, the last one was a flea flicker touchdown pass from 37 yards from Joe Theismann to Jean Fugett. But back came the Eagles who in the 3rd year of the Dick Vermeil era became a competitive team. Just after the Skins scored the Eagles came back as Montgomery first scored from 8 yards and then on the next possession scored from 5 yards. The Eagles also drove deep as Montgomery scored form 5 yards but was brought back due to a holding penalty and on the next play Mike Curtis intercept a Ron Jaworski pass ending the drive and with it the Redskins come away with a win and sole possession of first place in the NFC East.

=== Week 5 ===
| Quarter | 1 | 2 | 3 | 4 | Total |
|---|---|---|---|---|---|
| Cowboys (3-2) | 0 | 0 | 3 | 2 | **5** |
| **Redskins (5-0)** | 3 | 3 | 3 | 0 | **9** |

at Robert F. Kennedy Memorial Stadium

- Date: Monday, October 2
- Game time: 9:00 p.m.(et)
- Game weather: 68 degrees, relative humidity 58, round(wind) 13 mph
- Referee: Gene Barth
- TV announcers (ABC): Frank Gifford, Howard Cosell and Don Meredith

=== Standings ===
NFC East
| | W | L | T | PCT | DIV | CONF | PF | PA | STK |
|---|---|---|---|---|---|---|---|---|---|
| ^{(2)} Dallas Cowboys | 12 | 4 | 0 | .750 | 7–1 | 9–3 | 384 | 208 | W6 |
| ^{(5)} Philadelphia Eagles | 9 | 7 | 0 | .563 | 4–4 | 6–6 | 270 | 250 | W1 |
| Washington Redskins | 8 | 8 | 0 | .500 | 4–4 | 6–6 | 273 | 283 | L5 |
| St. Louis Cardinals | 6 | 10 | 0 | .375 | 3–5 | 6–6 | 248 | 296 | W1 |
| New York Giants | 6 | 10 | 0 | .375 | 2–6 | 5–9 | 264 | 298 | L1 |
