= List of Washington Commanders seasons =

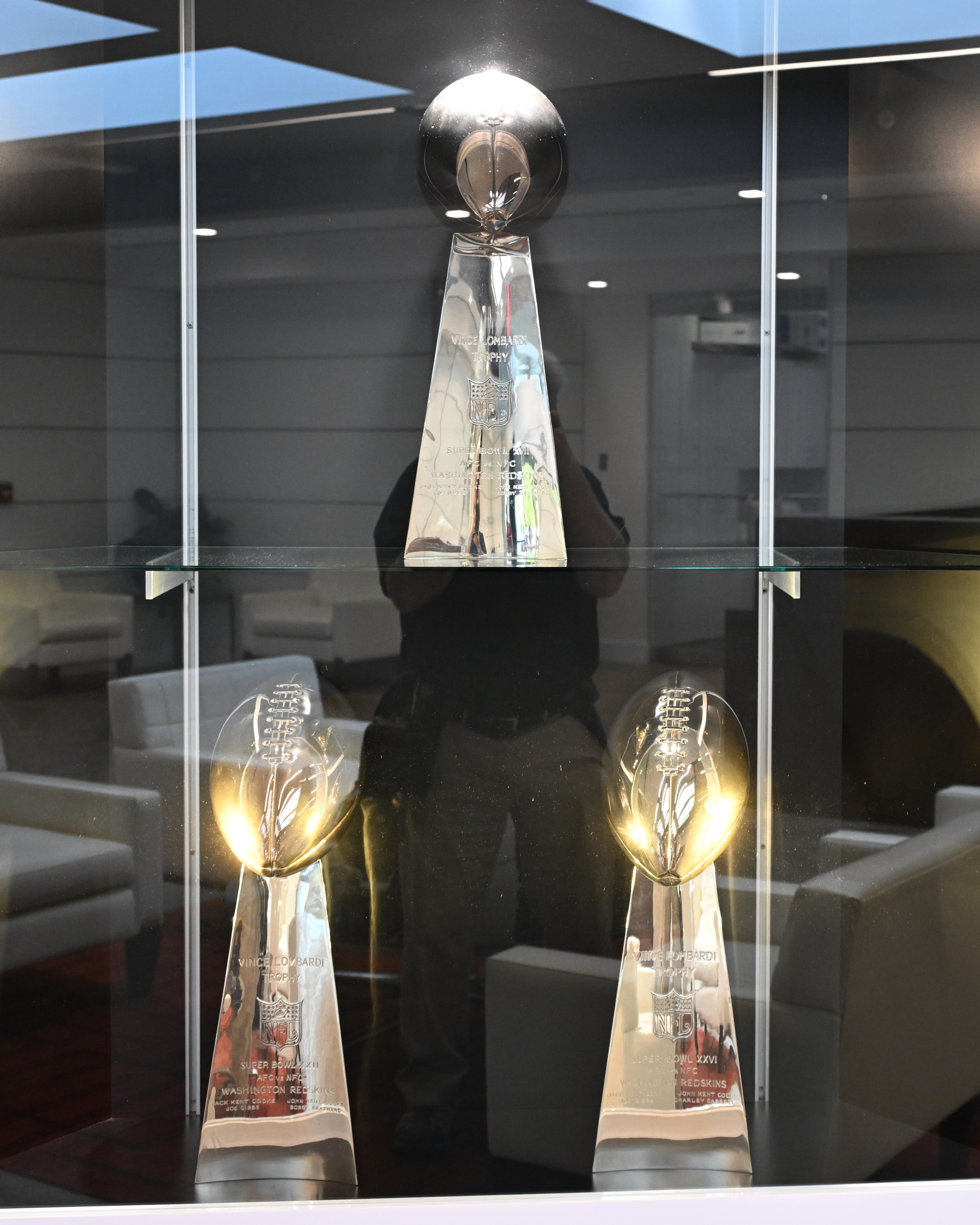
The Commanders have won three Super Bowls in their history.

The Washington Commanders are a professional American football franchise based in the Washington metropolitan area. They are members of the East division in the National Football Conference (NFC) of the National Football League (NFL). The Commanders were founded in 1932 as the Boston Braves, named after the local baseball franchise. The franchise changed its name the following year to the Redskins and moved to Washington, D.C. in 1937. In 2020, the team retired the controversial Redskins name and briefly played as the Washington Football Team before rebranding as the Commanders in 2022.

Over 93 seasons, the Commanders have a regular season record of 641–648–29 (.497) and a playoff record of 25–21 (.543). They have won three Super Bowls (XVII, XXII, and XXVI), two NFC championships, and 15 NFC East divisional titles. Before the AFL and NFL merged in 1970, Washington won two NFL Championships (1937 and 1942). They also played in and lost the 1936, 1940, 1943, and 1945 Championship games. Only six teams have appeared in more Super Bowls than Washington: the New England Patriots (11), and the Dallas Cowboys, Pittsburgh Steelers, Denver Broncos, and San Francisco 49ers (eight each), and the Kansas City Chiefs (6). Washington's five appearances are tied with the Green Bay Packers, Las Vegas Raiders, Los Angeles Rams, Miami Dolphins, New York Giants, and Philadelphia Eagles.

All of the franchise's championships were attained during two 10-year spans. The first period of success was from 1936 to 1945, when they went to the NFL Championship six times, winning two of them. The second period of success was from 1982 and 1991, when they appeared in the postseason seven times, captured four Conference titles, and won three Super Bowls. This period included the 1983 and 1991 seasons, when the team won 14 games, the most the team have won in a single season. Washington has also experienced periods of extended failure in its history. The most notable period of continued failure was from 1946 to 1970, when they posted only four winning seasons and did not have a single postseason appearance. During this period, they went without a single winning season between 1956 to 1968 and posted their worst regular-season record in franchise history, going 1–12–1 in 1961. Since their last Super Bowl win in 1991, Washington has only four playoff wins and only three seasons with 10 or more wins.

== Seasons ==
Key
NFL champions (1920–1969) §	Super Bowl champions (1970–present) *	Conference champions ^{#}	Division champions †	Wild card berth ^

List of Boston Braves / Boston Redskins / Washington Redskins / Washington Football Team / Washington Commanders seasons
Season	Conference	Division	Regular season				Postseason results	General manager	Head coach	Awards	Refs.
Season	Conference	Division	Finish	W	L	T	Postseason results	General manager	Head coach	Awards	Refs.
Boston Braves
1932	—	—	4th	4	4	2	—	George Preston Marshall	Lud Wray	—	
Boston Redskins
1933	—	East	3rd	5	5	2	—	Dennis J. Shea	Lone Star Dietz	—	
1934	—	East	2nd	6	6	0	—	Dennis J. Shea	Lone Star Dietz	—	
1935 (Note: In 1935, the NFL set the number of regular season games to 12. Prior to that, the NFL did not have a set number of games. The team only played 11 games however, as a road game against the Philadelphia Eagles was canceled due to bad weather.)	—	East	4th	2	8	1	—	Dennis J. Shea	Eddie Casey	—	
1936	—	East	1st†	7	5	0	Lost NFL Championship (Packers) 21–6	Dennis J. Shea	Ray Flaherty	—	
Washington Redskins
1937 (Note: In 1937, the NFL lowered the number of regular season games from 12 to 11.)	—	East	1st†	8	3	0	Won NFL Championship (1) (at Bears) 28–21	Jack Espey	Ray Flaherty	—	
1938	—	East	2nd	6	3	2	—	Jack Espey	Ray Flaherty	—	
1939	—	East	2nd	8	2	1	—	Jack Espey	Ray Flaherty	—	
1940	—	East	1st†	9	2	0	Lost NFL Championship (Bears) 73–0	Jack Espey	Ray Flaherty	—	
1941	—	East	3rd	6	5	0	—	Jack Espey	Ray Flaherty	—	
1942	—	East	1st†	10	1	0	Won NFL Championship (2) (Bears) 14–6	Jack Espey	Ray Flaherty	—	
1943 (Note: In 1943, the NFL lowered the number of regular season games from 11 to 10.)	—	East	1st†	6	3	1	Won Eastern Division (at Giants) 28–0; Lost NFL Championship (at Bears) 41–21	Sid Carroll	Dutch Bergman	—	
1944	—	East	3rd	6	3	1	—	Sid Carroll	Dudley DeGroot	—	
1945	—	East	1st†	8	2	0	Lost NFL Championship (at Rams) 15–14	Sid Carroll	Dudley DeGroot	—	
1946 (Note: In 1946, the NFL expanded the number of regular season games from 10 to 11.)	—	East	T-3rd	5	5	1	—	Sid Carroll	Turk Edwards	—	
1947 (Note: In 1947, the NFL expanded the number of regular season games from 11 to 12.)	—	East	4th	4	8	0	—	Dick McCann	Turk Edwards	—	
1948	—	East	2nd	7	5	0	—	Dick McCann	Turk Edwards	—	
1949	—	East	4th	4	7	1	—	Dick McCann	John Whelchel (3–3–1) Herman Ball (1–4)	—	
1950	American	—	6th	3	9	0	—	Dick McCann	Herman Ball	—	
1951	American	—	3rd	5	7	0	—	Dick McCann	Herman Ball (0–3) Dick Todd (5–4)	—	
1952	American	—	T-5th	4	8	0	—	Dick McCann	Curly Lambeau	—	
1953	Eastern	—	3rd	6	5	1	—	Dick McCann	Curly Lambeau	—	
1954	Eastern	—	5th	3	9	0	—	Dick McCann	Joe Kuharich	—	
1955	Eastern	—	2nd	8	4	0	—	Dick McCann	Joe Kuharich	Joe Kuharich (COY)	
1956	Eastern	—	3rd	6	6	0	—	Dick McCann	Joe Kuharich	—	
1957	Eastern	—	4th	5	6	1	—	Dick McCann	Joe Kuharich	—	
1958	Eastern	—	4th	4	7	1	—	Dick McCann	Joe Kuharich	—	
1959	Eastern	—	5th	3	9	0	—	Dick McCann	Mike Nixon	—	
1960	Eastern	—	6th	1	9	2	—	Dick McCann	Mike Nixon	—	
1961 (Note: In 1961, the NFL expanded the number of regular season games from 12 to 14.)	Eastern	—	7th	1	12	1	—	Bill McPeak		—	
1962	Eastern	—	4th	5	7	2	—	Bill McPeak		—	
1963	Eastern	—	6th	3	11	0	—	Bill McPeak		—	
1964	Eastern	—	T-3rd	6	8	0	—	Bill McPeak		Charley Taylor (ROY)	
1965	Eastern	—	4th	6	8	0	—	Bill McPeak		—	
1966	Eastern	—	5th	7	7	0	—	Otto Graham		—	
1967 (Note: In 1967, the NFL formed two conferences that were subdivided into two divisions. Prior to the realignment, the NFL was either divided into two divisions, two conferences, or neither.)	Eastern	Capitol	3rd	5	6	3	—	Otto Graham		—	
1968	Eastern	Capitol	3rd	5	9	0	—	Otto Graham		—	
1969	Eastern	Capitol	2nd	7	5	2	—	Vince Lombardi		—	
1970	NFC	East (Note: In 1970, the NFL merged with the American Football League (AFL) and saw the creation of the American Football Conference (AFC) and National Football Conference (NFC), with Washington being placed in the NFC East division.)	4th	6	8	0	—	Tim Temerario	Bill Austin	—	
1971	NFC	East	2nd^	9	4	1	Lost Divisional Round (at 49ers) 24–20	George Allen		George Allen (COY)	
1972	NFC^{#}	East	1st†	11	3	0	Won Divisional Round (Packers) 16–3; Won NFC Championship (Cowboys) 26–3; Lost Super Bowl VII (vs. Dolphins) 14–7	George Allen		Larry Brown (MVP & OPOY)	
1973	NFC	East	2nd^	10	4	0	Lost Divisional Round (at Vikings) 27–20	George Allen		—	
1974	NFC	East	2nd^	10	4	0	Lost Divisional Round (at Rams) 19–10	George Allen		—	
1975	NFC	East	3rd	8	6	0	—	George Allen		Mike Thomas (OROY)	
1976	NFC	East	2nd^	10	4	0	Lost Divisional Round (at Vikings) 35–20	George Allen		—	
1977	NFC	East	2nd	9	5	0	—	George Allen		—	
1978 (Note: In 1978, the NFL expanded the number of regular season games from 14 to 16.)	NFC	East	3rd	8	8	0	—	Bobby Beathard	Jack Pardee	John Riggins (CBPOY)	
1979	NFC	East	3rd	10	6	0	—	Bobby Beathard	Jack Pardee	Jack Pardee (COY)	
1980	NFC	East	3rd	6	10	0	—	Bobby Beathard	Jack Pardee	—	
1981	NFC	East	4th	8	8	0	—	Bobby Beathard	Joe Gibbs	Ken Houston (Byron "Whizzer" White Award)	
1982 (Note: In 1982, the regular season was shortened from 16 games to 9 due to the 1982 NFL strike.)	NFC^{#}		1st^{#}	8	1	0	Won First Round Playoffs (Lions) 31–7; Won Second Round Playoffs (Vikings) 21–7; Won NFC Championship (Cowboys) 31–17; Won Super Bowl XVII (3) (vs. Dolphins) 27–17	Bobby Beathard	Joe Gibbs	Joe Gibbs (COY); Mark Moseley (MVP); John Riggins (SBMVP); Joe Theismann (WPMOY); Bobby Beathard (EOY)	
1983	NFC^{#}	East	1st†	14	2	0	Won Divisional Round (Rams) 51–7; Won NFC Championship (49ers) 24–21; Lost Super Bowl XVIII (vs. Raiders) 38–9	Bobby Beathard	Joe Gibbs	Joe Gibbs (COY); Joe Theismann (MVP & OPOY); Bobby Beathard (EOY)	
1984	NFC	East	1st†	11	5	0	Lost Divisional Round (Bears) 23–19	Bobby Beathard	Joe Gibbs	—	
1985	NFC	East	3rd	10	6	0	—	Bobby Beathard	Joe Gibbs	—	
1986	NFC	East	2nd^	12	4	0	Won Wild Card Round (Rams) 19–7; Won Divisional Round (at Bears) 27–13; Lost NFC Championship (at Giants) 17–0	Bobby Beathard	Joe Gibbs	—	
1987 (Note: In 1987, the regular season was shortened from 16 games to 15 due to the 1987 NFL strike.)	NFC^{#}	East	1st†	11	4	0	Won Divisional Round (at Bears) 21–17; Won NFC Championship (Vikings) 17–10; Won Super Bowl XXII (4) (vs. Broncos) 42–10	Bobby Beathard	Joe Gibbs	Doug Williams (SBMVP)	
1988	NFC	East	3rd	7	9	0	—	Bobby Beathard	Joe Gibbs	—	
1989	NFC	East	3rd	10	6	0	—	Charley Casserly	Joe Gibbs	—	
1990	NFC	East	3rd^	10	6	0	Won Wild Card Round (at Eagles) 20–6; Lost Divisional Round (at 49ers) 28–10	Charley Casserly	Joe Gibbs	—	
1991	NFC^{#}	East	1st†	14	2	0	Won Divisional Round (Falcons) 24–7; Won NFC Championship (Lions) 41–10; Won Super Bowl XXVI (5) (vs. Bills) 37–24	Charley Casserly	Joe Gibbs	Joe Gibbs (COY); Mark Rypien (SBMVP & OPOY)	
1992	NFC	East	3rd^	9	7	0	Won Wild Card Round (at Vikings) 24–7; Lost Divisional Round (at 49ers) 20–13	Charley Casserly	Joe Gibbs	—	
1993	NFC	East	5th	4	12	0	—	Charley Casserly	Richie Petitbon	—	
1994	NFC	East	5th	3	13	0	—	Charley Casserly	Norv Turner	—	
1995	NFC	East	3rd	6	10	0	—	Charley Casserly	Norv Turner	—	
1996	NFC	East	3rd	9	7	0	—	Charley Casserly	Norv Turner	Darrell Green (WPMOY & Bart Starr Award)	
1997	NFC	East	2nd	8	7	1	—	Charley Casserly	Norv Turner	—	
1998	NFC	East	4th	6	10	0	—	Charley Casserly	Norv Turner	—	
1999	NFC	East	1st†	10	6	0	Won Wild Card Round (Lions) 27–13; Lost Divisional Round (at Buccaneers) 14–13	Charley Casserly	Norv Turner	—	
2000	NFC	East	3rd	8	8	0	—	Vinny Cerrato	Norv Turner (7–6) Terry Robiskie (1–2)	—	
2001	NFC	East	2nd	8	8	0	—	Marty Schottenheimer		—	
2002	NFC	East	3rd	7	9	0	—	Vinny Cerrato	Steve Spurrier	—	
2003	NFC	East	3rd	5	11	0	—	Vinny Cerrato	Steve Spurrier	—	
2004	NFC	East	4th	6	10	0	—	Vinny Cerrato	Joe Gibbs	—	
2005	NFC	East	2nd^	10	6	0	Won Wild Card Round (at Buccaneers) 17–10; Lost Divisional Round (at Seahawks) 20–10	Vinny Cerrato	Joe Gibbs	—	
2006	NFC	East	4th	5	11	0	—	Vinny Cerrato	Joe Gibbs	—	
2007	NFC	East	3rd^	9	7	0	Lost Wild Card Round (at Seahawks) 35–14	Vinny Cerrato	Joe Gibbs	—	
2008	NFC	East	4th	8	8	0	—	Vinny Cerrato	Jim Zorn	—	
2009	NFC	East	4th	4	12	0	—	Vinny Cerrato	Jim Zorn	—	
2010	NFC	East	4th	6	10	0	—	Bruce Allen	Mike Shanahan	—	
2011	NFC	East	4th	5	11	0	—	Bruce Allen	Mike Shanahan	London Fletcher (Bart Starr Award)	
2012	NFC	East	1st†	10	6	0	Lost Wild Card Round (Seahawks) 24–14	Bruce Allen	Mike Shanahan	Robert Griffin III (OROY)	
2013	NFC	East	4th	3	13	0	—	Bruce Allen	Mike Shanahan	—	
2014	NFC	East	4th	4	12	0	—	Bruce Allen	Jay Gruden	—	
2015	NFC	East	1st†	9	7	0	Lost Wild Card Round (Packers) 35–18	Scot McCloughan	Jay Gruden	—	
2016	NFC	East	3rd	8	7	1	—	Scot McCloughan	Jay Gruden	—	
2017	NFC	East	3rd	7	9	0	—	Bruce Allen	Jay Gruden	—	
2018	NFC	East	3rd	7	9	0	—	Bruce Allen	Jay Gruden	—	
2019	NFC	East	4th	3	13	0	—	Bruce Allen	Jay Gruden (0–5) Bill Callahan (3–8)	—	
Washington Football Team
2020	NFC	East	1st†	7	9	0	Lost Wild Card Round (Buccaneers) 31–23	Ron Rivera		Chase Young (DROY); Alex Smith (CBPOY)	
2021 (Note: In 2021, the NFL expanded the number of regular season games from 16 to 17.)	NFC	East	3rd	7	10	0	—	Martin Mayhew	Ron Rivera	Ron Rivera (George Halas Award)	
Washington Commanders
2022	NFC	East	4th	8	8	1	—	Martin Mayhew	Ron Rivera	—	
2023	NFC	East	4th	4	13	0	—	Martin Mayhew	Ron Rivera	—	
2024	NFC	East	2nd^	12	5	0	Won Wild Card Round (at Buccaneers) 23–20; Won Divisional Round (at Lions) 45–31; Lost NFC Championship (at Eagles) 55–23	Adam Peters	Dan Quinn	Jayden Daniels (OROY)	
2025	NFC	East	3rd	5	12	0	—	Adam Peters	Dan Quinn	Bobby Wagner (WPMOY)	
Totals				649	667	29	All-time regular season record				
Totals				25	21	—	All-time playoff record				
Totals				674	689	29	Combined record				
