= Eddie Brown (safety) =

American football player (born 1952)

No. 28, 25
- Positions: Safety, kick returner

Personal information
- Born: February 19, 1952 (age 74); Jasper, Tennessee, U.S.
- Listed height: 5 ft 11 in (1.80 m)
- Listed weight: 187 lb (85 kg)

Career information
- College: Tennessee
- NFL draft: 1974: 8th round, 199th overall pick

Career history
- Cleveland Browns (1974–1975); Washington Redskins (1975–1977); Los Angeles Rams (1978–1979); Chicago Blitz (1983); Arizona Wranglers (1984)

Awards and highlights
- Second-team All-Pro (1976); 2× Pro Bowl (1976, 1977); First-team All-SEC (1973); Tennessee Sports Hall of Fame (2002)

Career NFL statistics
- Interceptions: 8
- Kick return yards: 1,957
- Touchdowns: 1
- Stats at Pro Football Reference

Paul Edward Brown (born February 19, 1952) is an American former professional football player who was a safety in the National Football League (NFL) for the Cleveland Browns, the Washington Redskins, and the Los Angeles Rams. He played college football for the Tennessee Volunteers.

Brown attended Marion County High School in Jasper, Tennessee, and graduated in 1970. At the University of Tennessee, he was a safety and punt returner. In 1973, he was team captain as a senior and was a first-team All-America selection by Football News.

Brown was drafted by the Cleveland Browns in the eighth round of the 1974 NFL draft. He was traded to the Washington Redskins during the 1975 season, and was an All-Pro and Pro Bowl selection during the 1976 and 1977 seasons. In 1976, he led the National Football League in punt return yardage with 646 and was second in yards per return at 13.5. He also had a 71-yard return for a touchdown that season. In 1977, he led the NFL in punt returns with 57. On October 9, 1977, his 11 punt returns against the Tampa Bay Buccaneers set an NFL single-game record.

Traded to the Los Angeles Rams in 1978 for offensive lineman Jeff Williams, Brown played that season and 1979 for the Rams.

In 1979 the Rams won the National Football Conference championship and played the Pittsburgh Steelers in Super Bowl XIV on January 20, 1980. Brown had an interception in the third quarter, but Pittsburgh won, 31-19.

Brown returned to professional football in 1983 with the Chicago Blitz of the United States Football League. He had six interceptions, including one returned for a touchdown, that season. He played for the USFL's Arizona Wranglers in 1984 and had two interceptions.

Brown was inducted into the Tennessee Sports Hall of Fame in 2002.
