= Ricky Thompson =

American football player (born 1954)

- Thompson in 1977

No. 88, 83, 82
- Position: Wide receiver

Personal information
- Born: May 15, 1954 (age 72); El Paso, Texas, U.S.
- Listed height: 6 ft 0 in (1.83 m)
- Listed weight: 176 lb (80 kg)

Career information
- High school: Gatesville (Gatesville, Texas)
- College: Baylor
- NFL draft: 1976: 8th round, 228th overall pick

Career history
- Baltimore Colts (1976–1977); Washington Redskins (1978–1981); St. Louis Cardinals (1982)

Career NFL statistics
- Games played: 80
- Starts: 40
- Receptions: 97
- Receiving yards: 1,480
- Receiving TDs: 14
- Stats at Pro Football Reference

Ricky Don Thompson (born May 15, 1954) is an American former professional football player who was a wide receiver in the National Football League (NFL) for the Baltimore Colts, Washington Redskins, and St. Louis Cardinals. He played college football for the Baylor Bears and was selected in the eighth round of the 1976 NFL draft.

== Biography ==
=== Early life ===
Ricky Thompson was born May 15, 1954, in El Paso, Texas. He attended Gatesville High School in Gatesville, Texas, where he played baseball and football.

=== College career ===
Thompson was a member of the 1974 Southwest Conference (SWC) championship team at Baylor which is known in school lore as the "Miracle on the Brazos" team since the 1973 Baylor team had finished in last place and the 1974 team was picked last by many. He was named to the All-Southwest Conference team as a senior in 1975. Thompson scored two of Baylor's three touchdowns in the 1975 Cotton Bowl Classic against Penn State.

=== Professional career ===
He was drafted in the 8th round of the 1976 NFL draft by the Baltimore Colts, who used the 228th pick of the draft for his selection. He was used sparingly as a wide receiver during his first two seasons, instead seeing most of his playing opportunity as a member of the special teams coverage unit.

Unable to fight to the top of the Colts' depth chart, Thompson was traded on the eve of the 1978 season to the Washington Redskins, who exchanged a 6th round pick in the 1979 NFL draft for Thompson's contract. The pick was used to select Jim Moore of Ohio State, who ultimately never played in the NFL.

Thompson found a place with the Redskins. He played in all 16 of the team's games in 1978, mostly off the bench, catching 23 balls for 350 yards. He was a starter for Washington in both 1979 and 1980, catching 22 balls during each of those campaigns, and a regular rotational player in 1981, when he caught a career best 28 balls for 423 yards.

He was briefly on the roster of the St. Louis Cardinals in 1982 before retiring from the league at the age of 28.

Thompson is currently the football sideline reporter for the Baylor Radio Network.
