= Benny Malone =

American football player (1951–2020)

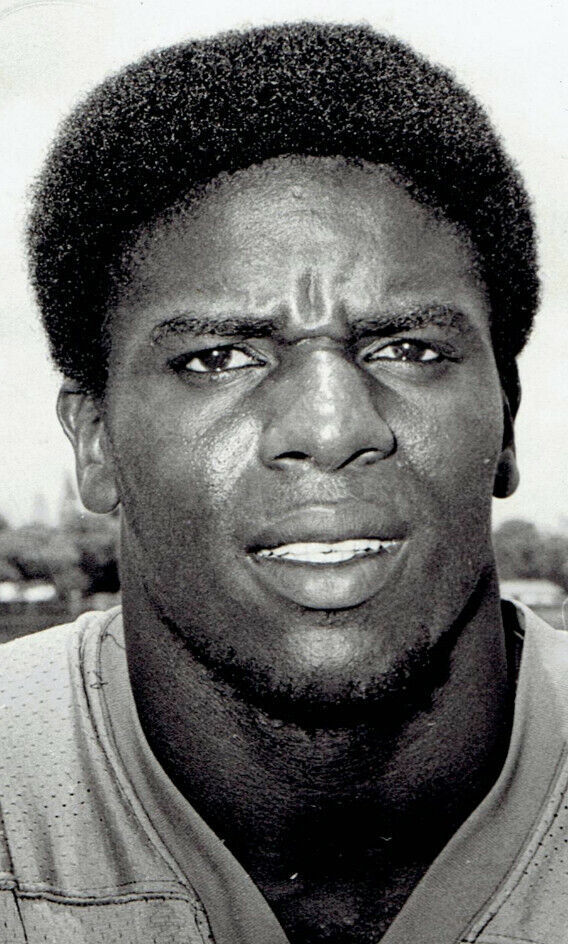
- Malone in 1975

No. 32, 25
- Position: Running back

Personal information
- Born: February 3, 1952; Tyler, Texas, U.S.
- Died: March 19, 2020 (aged 68); Tempe, Arizona, U.S.
- Listed height: 5 ft 10 in (1.78 m)
- Listed weight: 193 lb (88 kg)

Career information
- High school: Santa Cruz Valley Union (AZ)
- College: Arizona State
- NFL draft: 1974: 2nd round, 47th overall pick

Career history
- Miami Dolphins (1974–1978); Washington Redskins (1978–1979)

Career NFL statistics
- Rushing attempts: 706
- Rushing yards: 2,693
- Total touchdowns: 20
- Stats at Pro Football Reference

Benjamin Malone Jr. (February 3, 1952 – March 19, 2020) was an American professional football player who was a running back in the National Football League (NFL). He played college football for the Arizona State Sun Devils and was selected by the Miami Dolphins in the second round of the 1974 NFL draft. He also played for the Washington Redskins.

== Early life ==
Malone grew up in Eloy, Arizona and attended Santa Cruz Valley Union High School.

== College career ==
He played college football at Arizona State and was selected in the second round (47th overall) of the 1974 NFL draft by the Miami Dolphins.

At Arizona State in 1971 he ran for 857 yards and 4 TD while averaging 8.2 yards per carry. 1973 he ran for 1,129 yards and 15 TD while averaging 6.4 yards per carry. He joined the Sun Devil Sports Hall of Fame in 1983.

== Professional career ==
=== Miami Dolphins ===
Malone was selected by the Miami Dolphins in the second round (47th overall selection) of the 1974 NFL draft. He played for the Dolphins from 1974 to 1977. In his Miami career, Malone carried the ball 503 times totaling 2,129 yards and 16 rushing touchdowns. His most significant contribution came in the 1974 Divisional Playoff game at the Oakland Raiders. Playing for the injured Mercury Morris, Malone ran for 83 yards on 14 carries, including a 23-yard touchdown run with 2:08 remaining that appeared to give Miami the win. But the Raiders scored with 26 seconds left. The TD play became known as "The Sea of Hands" catch.

=== Washington Redskins ===
Six games into the 1978 season, Malone was traded to the Washington Redskins. He played for the Washington Redskins for the 1978 and 1979 seasons.

== NFL career statistics ==
Legend
**Bold**	Career high

=== Regular season ===
Year	Team	Games		Rushing					Receiving				
Year	Team	GP	GS	Att	Yds	Avg	Lng	TD	Rec	Yds	Avg	Lng	TD
1974	MIA	13	3	117	479	4.1	23	3	2	26	13.0	13	0
1975	MIA	10	0	65	220	3.4	21	3	2	47	**23.5**	43	0
1976	MIA	14	12	**186**	**797**	4.3	31	4	9	103	11.4	36	0
1977	MIA	14	8	129	615	**4.8**	**66**	**5**	4	58	14.5	35	0
1978	MIA	6	0	6	18	3.0	7	1	0	0	0.0	0	0
1978	WAS	9	1	27	92	3.4	31	0	3	29	9.7	19	0
1979	WAS	**16**	**16**	176	472	2.7	14	3	**13**	**137**	10.5	**55**	**1**
		82	40	706	2,693	3.8	66	19	33	400	12.1	55	1

=== Playoffs ===
Year	Team	Games		Rushing					Receiving				
Year	Team	GP	GS	Att	Yds	Avg	Lng	TD	Rec	Yds	Avg	Lng	TD
1974	MIA	**1**	**1**	**14**	**83**	**5.9**	**23**	**1**	0	0	0.0	0	0
		1	1	14	83	5.9	23	1	0	0	0.0	0	0

== Personal life and death ==
Malone's brother Art Malone also played running back at Arizona State and in the NFL.

He died on March 19, 2020, aged 68 from complications due to diabetes.
