= Mark Moseley =

American football player (born 1948)

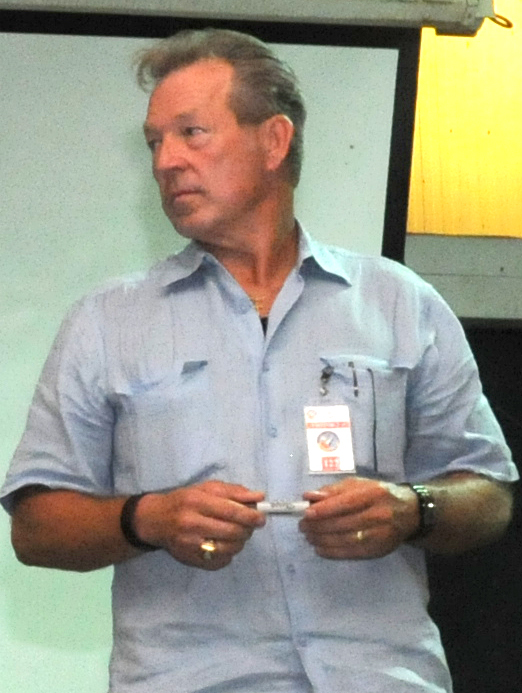
- Moseley in 2012

No. 3, 11
- Position: Kicker

Personal information
- Born: March 12, 1948 (age 78); Laneville, Texas, U.S.
- Listed height: 5 ft 11 in (1.80 m)
- Listed weight: 202 lb (92 kg)

Career information
- High school: Livingston (Livingston, Texas)
- College: Texas A&M (1965–1966); Stephen F. Austin (1967–1969)
- NFL draft: 1970: 14th round, 346th overall pick

Career history
- Philadelphia Eagles (1970); Houston Oilers (1971–1972); Washington Redskins (1974–1986); Cleveland Browns (1986)

Awards and highlights
- Super Bowl champion (XVII); NFL Most Valuable Player (1982); UPI NFC Player of the Year (1982); First-team All-Pro (1982); 2× Pro Bowl (1979, 1982); NFL scoring leader (1983); 80 Greatest Redskins; Washington Commanders Ring of Fame

Career NFL statistics
- Field goals: 300/457 (65.6%)
- Points scored: 1,382
- Stats at Pro Football Reference

Mark DeWayne Moseley (born March 12, 1948) is an American former professional football player who was a placekicker in the National Football League (NFL) for 16 seasons. He played for Philadelphia Eagles (1970), the Houston Oilers (1971–72), the Washington Redskins (1974–86), and the Cleveland Browns (1986). A native of Livingston, Texas, Moseley played quarterback at Texas A&M University and Stephen F. Austin State University before switching to kicker for his senior season at Stephen F. Austin.

Selected by the Eagles in the 14th round of the 1970 NFL draft, he played one season with them and then two seasons with the Houston Oilers. He was out of football in 1973 before signing with the Washington Redskins in 1974, with whom he played until 1986. He won the NFL Most Valuable Player Award during the strike-shortened 1982 season. He is the only pure special teams player to win the NFL MVP award and is one of only three non-offensive MVPs.

Moseley was released by the Redskins in 1986 and retired that year after a few games with the Cleveland Browns.

== Early life and education ==
Moseley grew up in Livingston, Texas, and played football at Livingston High School. After high school, he attended Texas A&M University from 1965 to 1966 and Stephen F. Austin State University (SFA) from 1967 to 1969. He played quarterback while at both schools until his senior season at SFA when he made the switch to placekicker. In that season, he set Lone Star Conference records for most points in a game and most field goals in a season.

== Professional career ==
Moseley was selected 346th overall in the 14th round of the 1970 NFL draft by the Philadelphia Eagles. He was released by the Eagles in 1971 and signed by the Houston Oilers only to be released again in 1972. He spent two years out of the NFL and moved back to Livingston, Texas, where he installed septic systems and coached high school sports. During this period, he sent letters to two dozen NFL teams and routinely practiced kicking with his children returning his kicks. In 1974, the Washington Redskins signed him as a free agent.

With the retirement of the Minnesota Vikings' Rick Danmeier in 1982, Moseley became the sole full-time straight on placekicker in the National Football League. In the 1960s, the "soccer-style" of kicking (wherein the kicker approaches the ball at an angle and kicks it with the instep) was introduced by the Hungarian brothers Pete and Charlie Gogolak, and it is now universal in the NFL and other levels.

In the strike-shortened 1982 season, Moseley converted 23 straight field goals from 1981 to 1982 (a record at the time), made a league-leading 20 of 21 field goals, a then-record 95.2 success rate, and was responsible for 76 points. He became the first placekicker to ever win the Associated Press NFL Most Valuable Player; (Hall of Famer Lou Groza won the Sporting News NFL Player of the Year Award in 1954 as a placekicker and offensive tackle, followed by George Blanda winning the same as a kicker and quarterback in 1970.) Moseley had a much rougher time in the postseason, missing four field goals in Washington's two postseason games. But in the Washington Redskins' 27–17 victory in Super Bowl XVII over the Miami Dolphins, Moseley kicked two field goals and was successful on all three of his extra point attempts. During the following season, he led the NFL in scoring with 161 points. He also kicked the game-winning field goal in Washington's 24–21 win over the San Francisco 49ers in the NFC championship game, despite missing four prior attempts in the game.

In 1986, the 38-year-old Moseley was released by the Washington Redskins mid-season. He remains their all-time leading scorer with 1,207 points. He signed with the Cleveland Browns and retired at the end of the season, helping them win their divisional playoff game against the New York Jets with a game-winning field goal in double overtime despite missing two field goals in regulation and another in the first overtime period. In what became his final game the following week for the AFC Championship, he made both of his field goals and extra points, but in a game later referred to as "The Drive", the Denver Broncos drove 98 yards to send the game into overtime and subsequently won in overtime.

In his career, Moseley was successful on 300 out of 457 field-goal attempts (65%), successful on 482 out of 512 extra points attempts (94%), and scored a total of 1,382 points. He led the NFL in field goals made four times. He ranked fifth in field goals in NFL history when he retired (one of only five players with 300 field goals) and 5th in extra points (one of 12 with 1,000 points).

== NFL career statistics ==
Career high/best

Regular season statistics
Season	Team	G	FGM	FGA	%	<20	20-29	30-39	40-49	50+	LNG	BLK	XPM	XPA	%	PTS
1970	PHI	14	14	25	56.0	7–9	4–6	2–6	1–3	0–1	42	0	25	28	89.3	67
1971	HOU	12	16	26	61.5	0–0	8–9	2–4	6–10	0–3	44	0	25	27	92.6	73
1972	HOU	1	1	2	50.0	0–0	1–1	0–0	0–1	0–0	20	0	2	2	100.0	5
1974	WSH	13	18	30	60.0	1–1	2–5	9–13	6–10	0–1	48	0	27	29	93.1	81
1975	WSH	14	16	25	64.0	0–0	1–3	9–10	6–9	0–3	48	0	37	39	94.9	85
1976	WSH	14	22	34	64.7	1–1	7–8	8–11	6–13	0–1	49	0	31	32	96.9	97
1977	WSH	14	21	37	56.8	1–1	3–3	4–5	9–22	4–6	54	0	19	19	100.0	82
1978	WSH	16	19	30	63.3	0–0	4–4	5–7	8–13	2–6	52	0	30	31	96.8	87
1979	WSH	16	25	33	75.8	2–2	5–5	8–10	9–13	1–3	53	0	39	39	100.0	114
1980	WSH	16	18	33	54.5	0–0	3–4	5–6	7–12	3–11	52	0	27	30	90.0	81
1981	WSH	16	19	30	63.3	1–1	7–8	6–8	5–12	0–1	49	0	38	42	90.5	95
1982	WSH	9	20	21	95.2	1–1	6–6	8–8	5–6	0–0	48	0	16	19	84.2	76
1983	WSH	16	33	47	70.2	1–1	10–10	14–19	7–12	1–3	51	0	62	63	98.4	161
1984	WSH	16	24	31	77.4	1–1	9–10	12–13	1–5	1–2	51	0	48	51	94.1	120
1985	WSH	16	22	34	64.7	0–0	7–8	8–13	7–12	0–1	48	0	31	33	93.9	97
1986	WSH	6	6	12	50.0	1–1	3–4	1–2	1–5	0–0	45	0	12	14	85.7	30
1986	CLE	4	6	7	85.7	1–1	2–2	3–3	0–1	0–0	39	0	13	14	92.9	31
Career (16 seasons)		213	300	457	65.6	18–20	82–96	104–138	84–159	12–42	54	0	482	512	94.1	1382

== Personal life ==
Moseley owned two restaurants in Virginia and later became the director of franchising for Five Guys Enterprises. He has five children and 13 grandchildren. Moseley's younger sister, Pamela Moseley Carpenter, was murdered by Johnny Paul Penry in 1979. After the killing, Moseley was extremely critical of the criminal justice system's treatment of Penry, who was released after serving two years of a five-year sentence for rape months before the murder took place. Moseley said he supported giving Penry the death penalty.
