= Tom Birney =

Scottish gridiron football player (born 1956)

No. 19, 16
- Position: Placekicker

Personal information
- Born: August 11, 1956 (age 70); Bellshill, Scotland
- Listed height: 6 ft 4 in (1.93 m)
- Listed weight: 220 lb (100 kg)

Career information
- High school: Bishop Borgess (Redford, Michigan)
- College: Michigan State (1974–1977)
- NFL draft: 1978: undrafted

Career history
- New England Patriots (1978)*; Green Bay Packers (1979–1980); Cincinnati Bengals (1981)*; Pittsburgh Steelers (1982)*; Michigan Panthers (1983)*
- * Offseason or practice squad member only

Career NFL statistics
- Field goals made: 13
- Field goal attempts: 21
- Field goal %: 61.9
- Longest field goal: 50
- Stats at Pro Football Reference

Thomas Francis Birney (born August 11, 1956) is a Scottish-born American former professional football player. A placekicker, he played two seasons in the National Football League (NFL) for the Green Bay Packers. He played college football for the Michigan State Spartans and was also a member of the New England Patriots, Cincinnati Bengals and Pittsburgh Steelers in the NFL, and the Michigan Panthers of the United States Football League.

== Early life ==
Birney was born on August 11, 1956, in Bellshill, Scotland. The son of a soccer player, he moved to the U.S. at age six, settling in Detroit, Michigan. He attended Bishop Borgess High School in Michigan and played football as a placekicker and defensive end. He was regarded as one of the top kickers in the state and made several game-winning field goals at Bishop Borgess, being nicknamed "Thunderfoot". He opted to play college football for the Michigan State Spartans after he graduated from high school in 1974.

== College career ==
Birney had been offered to play for Michigan State after their previous target, Hans Nielsen, was unsure of whether he was going to play after the death of his father. However, Nielsen opted to play for Michigan State anyway and thus the Spartans had two kickers. Birney became the kickoff specialist, a punter, and was occasionally used at placekicker when Nielsen was injured, although he did not attempt any field goals at Michigan State.

Birney played for the Spartans from 1974 to 1977, earning a varsity letter each year. As a junior in 1976, he was considered one of the best kickoff specialists nationally. Although a top kickoff specialist, he was regarded as one of the worst punters, having an average of 38.1 yards per punt. He remained kickoff specialist as a senior but was replaced at punter by Ray Stachowicz.

== Professional career ==
After going unselected in the 1978 NFL draft, Birney signed with the New England Patriots as an undrafted free agent. He was used in preseason at punter but was released on August 17, 1978. While a free agent, Birney continued practicing his kicking, and on May 17, 1979, he signed with the Green Bay Packers. He was released on August 14, 1979.

After being released by the Packers, Birney said he was discouraged and nearly quit the sport, deciding to work as a substitute teacher in Michigan. When the Packers' normal kicker, Chester Marcol, got injured mid-season, the team re-signed Birney on November 7, 1979. He described his return to football as a "miracle in itself," given that he had last kicked a field goal in high school and there were many other experienced kickers available that the team could have signed. He made his NFL debut in Week 11 against the Minnesota Vikings, but struggled early on, converting only one of his three extra point attempts against the Vikings, and missing another extra point against the Buffalo Bills the next week, although he made both of his field goal attempts in the latter game. He made every extra point attempt after that and in Week 16, an 18–13 win over the Detroit Lions, Birney made four of five field goal attempts, tying the Packers single-game record for field goals made at the time. He was named Pro Football Weekly's NFL Special Teams Player of the Week for his performance. He concluded the season having appeared in six games and made seven of 10 extra points and seven of nine field goals, with a long of 46 yards.

Birney competed with Marcol for the Packers' kicking job in 1980 but was released on August 26, in favor of Marcol. After being released, he returned to being a substitute teacher. Later in the year, Marcol was released and the Packers re-signed Birney, with him playing his first game in 1980 against the Tampa Bay Buccaneers on October 12. He made both extra point attempts, but missed all three field goal attempts, including a potential game-winning 25-yard kick towards the end of regulation. He had another attempt near the end of overtime, but missed a 35-yard kick; the game finished as a 14–14 tie. Although there were suggestions for him to be released, head coach Bart Starr defended him and kept him on the team. He ended up playing in seven games during the 1980 season, converting 14 of 18 extra point attempts and six of 12 field goals. He was named the Week 10 Special Teams Player of the Week by Pro Football Weekly. With four games left in the season, he was released in favor of Jan Stenerud. He expressed surprise at being released, although it was noted that his play was affected by a right-handed holder; Birney was left-footed and the holder was not able to always hold the ball correctly for him, while Stenerud was right-footed.

On January 20, 1981, Birney signed with the Cincinnati Bengals, but was later released on August 29. He signed with the Pittsburgh Steelers in 1982, but was released before the regular season as well. He then signed with the Michigan Panthers of the United States Football League (USFL) in 1983 but also did not make the team. He concluded his NFL career having appeared in 13 games, making 21 of 28 extra point attempts and 13 of 21 field goals, with a long of 50 yards. He was the last "straight-on" kicker to play for the Packers and one of the last in the NFL as a whole, with most kickers afterwards being "soccer style" kickers.
