= Zion McKinney =

American football player (born 1958)

No. 80
- Position: Wide receiver

Personal information
- Born: February 10, 1958 (age 68); Pickens, South Carolina, U.S.
- Listed height: 6 ft 0 in (1.83 m)
- Listed weight: 200 lb (91 kg)

Career information
- High school: Pickens
- College: South Carolina
- NFL draft: 1980: undrafted

Career history
- Washington Redskins (1980)
- Stats at Pro Football Reference

Zion Bailus McKinney (born February 10, 1958) is an American former professional football player who was a wide receiver for the Washington Redskins of the National Football League (NFL) in 1980. He played college football for the South Carolina Gamecocks. He played ten games for the Redskins.
