= Melvin Jones (American football) =

American football player (born 1956)

No. 61
- Position: Guard

Personal information
- Born: February 27, 1954 (age 72); Houston, Texas, U.S.
- Listed height: 6 ft 2 in (1.88 m)
- Listed weight: 260 lb (118 kg)

Career information
- High school: Klein (Klein, Texas)
- College: Houston
- NFL draft: 1980: 7th round, 187th overall pick

Career history
- Washington Redskins (1981)

Awards and highlights
- First-team All-American (1979); 2x First-team All-SWC (1978, 1979)

Career NFL statistics
- Games played: 11
- Games started: 10
- Fumble recoveries: 1
- Stats at Pro Football Reference

Melvin Earl Jones (born September 27, 1956) is an American former professional football player who was an offensive lineman for the Washington Redskins of the National Football League (NFL).

He played college football for the Houston Cougars and was selected in the seventh round of the 1980 NFL draft. After getting phlebitis at the 1980 training camp, he was the injured reserve list for that season. He played during the 1981 season, but was cut from the 1982 team.
