= Rich Milot =

American football player (1957–2021)

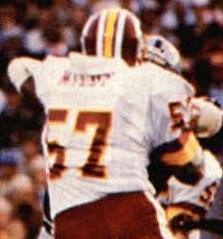
- Milot playing for the Redskins in Super Bowl XVIII

No. 57
- Position: Linebacker

Personal information
- Born: May 28, 1957; Coraopolis, Pennsylvania, U.S.
- Died: August 13, 2021 (aged 64)
- Listed height: 6 ft 4 in (1.93 m)
- Listed weight: 234 lb (106 kg)

Career information
- High school: Moon Area (Moon Township, Pennsylvania)
- College: Penn State
- NFL draft: 1979: 7th round, 182nd overall pick

Career history
- Washington Redskins (1979–1987)

Awards and highlights
- 2× Super Bowl champion (XVII, XXII)

Career NFL statistics
- Sacks: 20.5
- Interceptions: 13
- Fumble recoveries: 5
- Stats at Pro Football Reference

Richard Paul Milot (May 28, 1957 – August 13, 2021) was an American professional football player who was a linebacker for his entire nine-year career with the Washington Redskins of the National Football League (NFL) from 1979 to 1987. He played college football for the Penn State Nittany Lions. He won two Super Bowls with Washington.

== College career ==
Milot played college football at Penn State University. After two seasons playing as a backup running back, Milot was converted to linebacker, going on to intercept 3 passes in his final year with the Nittany Lions. He was drafted in the seventh round of the 1979 NFL draft.

== NFL career ==
During his nine NFL seasons, Milot intercepted 13 passes and returned them for 120 yards, while also recording 20.5 sacks and 5 fumble recoveries. He won two Super Bowl rings with the Redskins: Super Bowl XVII and Super Bowl XXII. Milot's most memorable performance came in a 1984 NFC Divisional Playoff Game against Chicago, where he recorded 3.5 sacks in a loss to the Bears.

== Post-NFL career ==
During the off seasons of his NFL career, Milot worked for the Sandoz pharmaceutical office in Washington, DC. In his role, he worked on the staff of Utah Senator Orrin Hatch where he attended political hearings and met with congressional staff.

Following his retirement from the NFL, Milot worked as a Senior Tax Advisor at H&R Block in Manassas, Virginia.
