= Jack Pardee =

American football player and coach (1936–2013)

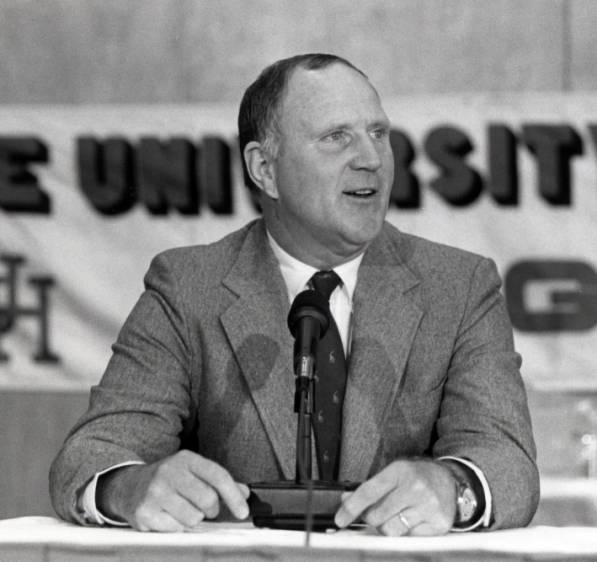
- Pardee as head coach of the Houston Cougars football team

No. 32
- Position: Linebacker

Personal information
- Born: April 19, 1936; Exira, Iowa, U.S.
- Died: April 1, 2013 (aged 76); Centennial, Colorado, U.S.
- Listed height: 6 ft 2 in (1.88 m)
- Listed weight: 225 lb (102 kg)

Career information
- High school: Christoval (Christoval, Texas)
- College: Texas A&M (1953–1956)
- NFL draft: 1957: 2nd round, 14th overall pick

Career history

Playing
- Los Angeles Rams (1957–1970); Washington Redskins (1971–1972)

Coaching
- Florida Blazers (1974) Head coach; Chicago Bears (1975–1977) Head coach; Washington Redskins (1978–1980) Head coach; San Diego Chargers (1981) Defensive coordinator; Houston Gamblers (1984–1985) Head coach; Houston (1987–1989) Head coach; Houston Oilers (1990–1994) Head coach; Birmingham Barracudas (1995) Head coach

Awards and highlights
- As player: First-team All-Pro (1963); Pro Bowl (1963); First-team All-American (1956); First-team All-SWC (1956); Second-team All-SWC (1955); As coach: AP NFL Coach of the Year (1979); 2× UPI Coach of the Year (1976, 1979)

Career NFL statistics
- Interceptions: 22
- Fumble recoveries: 17
- Touchdowns: 6
- Sacks: 24
- Stats at Pro Football Reference

Head coaching record
- Postseason: Bowls: 0–1 (.000)
- Career: NFL: 87–77 (.530); USFL: 23–13 (.639); NCAA: 22–11–1 (.662); CFL: 10–8 (.556)
- Coaching profile at Pro Football Reference
- College Football Hall of Fame

John Perry Pardee (April 19, 1936 – April 1, 2013) was an American professional football player and head coach. He played as a linebacker in the National Football League (NFL). As a coach, he is the only head coach to helm a team in college football, the NFL, the United States Football League (USFL), the World Football League (WFL), and the Canadian Football League (CFL). Pardee was inducted into the College Football Hall of Fame as a player in 1986.

== Playing career ==
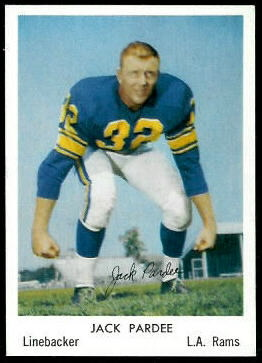
Pardee in 1959

As a teenager, Pardee moved to Christoval, Texas, where he excelled as a member of the six-man football team. He was an All-America fullback at Texas A&M University and a two-time All-Pro with the Los Angeles Rams (1963) and the Washington Redskins (1971). He was one of the few six-man players to ever make it to the NFL, and his knowledge of that wide-open game served him well as a coach.

Pardee was one of the famed Junction Boys, the 1954 Texas A&M preseason camp held in Junction, Texas, by football coach Paul "Bear" Bryant. He was part of the 35 left from the roughly 100 players who went to Junction. After completing college at Texas A&M, Pardee was selected with the first pick of the second round (14th overall) in the 1957 NFL draft by the Los Angeles Rams as a linebacker. Pardee played for the Rams from 1957 to 1970, sitting out the 1965 season to treat a melanoma in his left arm. Pardee was alerted to his own cancer after reading about Houston Astros pitcher Jim Umbricht, who died from an aggressive form of skin cancer.

Pardee was traded from the Rams to the Redskins in a multiplayer deal during the first round of the 1971 NFL draft on January 28, 1971. He ended his playing career after two seasons with the Redskins at the end of the 1972 NFL season.

== Coaching career ==
=== WFL ===
When the World Football League started in 1974, Pardee got his first head-coaching job with the Washington Ambassadors. The team later relocated to Norfolk, Virginia, as the Virginia Ambassadors, before finally moving to their third and final home in Orlando as the Florida Blazers. The Blazers made it to the 1974 World Bowl and lost by one point to the Birmingham Americans. Pardee's regular-season coaching record in 1974 with the Blazers was 14–6, and 2–1 in the 1974 WFL Playoffs and World Bowl. This was all the more remarkable considering that the Blazers went unpaid for the last three months of the season. Some of the Blazers players relocated to San Antonio as the Wings for the 1975 season, and Pardee also moved on, signing on as head coach of the Chicago Bears for the 1975 season.

=== First stint as a head coach in the NFL ===
In 1975, Pardee was hired by the Chicago Bears as head coach. He spent the next three years there, leading Chicago to their first playoff berth in 14 years in 1977, before moving on to the Washington Redskins. In 1979, he led the Redskins to within one game of making the playoffs, but in the season's final week, they squandered a 13-point lead to the eventual NFC East champion Dallas Cowboys and missed the playoffs. He was fired after going 6–10 in 1980. In 1981, he was hired as assistant head coach in charge of defense for the San Diego Chargers.

=== USFL ===
In 1984, Pardee returned to his native Texas by becoming the head coach of the Houston Gamblers. The Gamblers played spring football in the United States Football League. The Gamblers had one of the most potent offenses in professional football, the run and shoot offense, with Jim Kelly as quarterback. The Gamblers merged with the New Jersey Generals in 1986, and Pardee was named head coach. With Kelly and Doug Flutie both vying for the role of starting quarterback, and Herschel Walker in the backfield, the Generals were poised to dominate the USFL, but the league folded prior to the 1986 season.

=== NCAA ===
Pardee returned to Houston in 1987 as head coach at the University of Houston. During his three-year stint, the Cougars, using the same offense he coached in the USFL, produced the first-ever African American quarterback to win the Heisman Trophy, Andre Ware. His team also became the first major college team in NCAA history to have over 1,000 total offensive yards in a single game, racking up 1,021 yards while beating SMU, 95–21.

Not long after Pardee's arrival, however, Houston was slapped with crippling NCAA sanctions due to numerous major violations under his predecessor, Bill Yeoman. Among them, the Cougars were banned from bowl games in 1989 and 1990 and kicked off live television in 1989. As a result, most of the nation never got a chance to see the Cougars set numerous offensive records during the 1989 season.

=== Second stint as a head coach in the NFL ===
In 1990, Pardee packed up the run-and-shoot offense and moved across town, and back to the NFL, by joining the Houston Oilers. He spent five years coaching a team that made the playoffs each of his first four years there, led by Hall of Fame quarterback Warren Moon. In 1991, the Oilers won their first division title since 1967 in the American Football League. During his time with the Oilers, Pardee fell victim to NFL notoriety during the 1992 season, when in that season's playoffs, the Oilers surrendered a 35-3 third-quarter lead to the Buffalo Bills, losing in overtime to the eventual conference champions 41–38.

The Oilers won another division title in 1993 on the strength of winning their last 11 games despite their season being wracked with turmoil on and off the field. However, after losing in the second round of the playoffs, owner Bud Adams made good on a threat to hold a fire sale if they did not make the Super Bowl. The highest-profile loss was Moon, who was traded to the Minnesota Vikings. Without Moon, the Oilers were a rudderless team. Pardee was fired following a 1–9 start to the 1994 season, and was replaced by defensive coordinator Jeff Fisher.

=== CFL comes to America ===
He continued his coaching career in the Canadian Football League. In 1995, he was named head coach of the CFL expansion team, the Birmingham Barracudas. Canadian football is more wide open than American football, with a field that has an additional 10 yards added to each endzone, as well as a 55 yardline and wider field. Birmingham owner Art Williams thought Pardee's roots in the six-man game made him a natural fit. The 'Cudas were part of a failed experiment to expand the CFL into the United States. With Matt Dunigan at quarterback, Birmingham made the playoffs, but lost in the first round. However, due to dreadful attendance late in the season and the league's refusal to approve the team's proposed relocation to Shreveport, Louisiana, for 1996, the 'Cudas were shuttered at the end of the season along with the CFL's other American teams.

=== Return to coaching ===
In December 2007, Pardee, then 71, was contacted by athletic director Dave Maggard about the vacant head coaching job at the University of Houston. Signaling interest, he made it as far as a finalist for the position, but the school moved forward with Oklahoma co-offensive coordinator Kevin Sumlin.

== Personal life ==
Pardee was married for 50 years to Phyllis Lane Perryman and had five children and 12 grandchildren. Pardee's youngest son, Ted, is the color commentator for the Houston Cougars football radio broadcasts. Ted's older son Payton Pardee is the former head coach of the San Antonio Brahmas of the United Football League, and the current tight ends coach and special teams Coordinator at UTEP. Ted’s younger son, Luke Pardee played at TCU, and is now the Assistant Tight Ends Coach at Oklahoma State University

In November 2012, Pardee was diagnosed with gallbladder cancer and his family reported that he only had six to nine more months to live, The cancer spread to other organs and Pardee moved to a Denver hospice.

Pardee died April 1, 2013. The family has established a memorial scholarship fund in Pardee's name at the University of Houston. He was survived by his wife Phyllis, five children, and 12 grandchildren. Jack's youngest grandson, Luke Pardee, was then a quarterback at Texas Christian University,

== Head coaching record ==
=== NFL ===
Team	Year	Regular season					Postseason			
Team	Year	Won	Lost	Ties	Win %	Finish	Won	Lost	Win %	Result
CHI	1975	4	10	0	.286	3rd in NFC Central	-	-	-	-
CHI	1976	7	7	0	.500	2nd in NFC Central	-	-	-	-
CHI	1977	9	5	0	.643	2nd in NFC Central	0	1	.000	Lost to Dallas Cowboys in NFC Divisional Game
CHI Total		20	22	0	.476		0	1	.000	
WAS	1978	8	8	0	.500	3rd in NFC East	-	-	-	-
WAS	1979	10	6	0	.625	3rd in NFC East	-	-	-	-
WAS	1980	6	10	0	.375	3rd in NFC East	-	-	-	-
WAS Total		24	24	0	.500		0	0	.000	
HOU	1990	9	7	0	.563	2nd in AFC Central	0	1	.000	Lost to Cincinnati Bengals in AFC wild card game
HOU	1991	11	5	0	.688	1st in AFC Central	1	1	.500	Lost to Denver Broncos in AFC Divisional Game
HOU	1992	10	6	0	.625	2nd in AFC Central	0	1	.000	Lost to Buffalo Bills in AFC Wild Card Game
HOU	1993	12	4	0	.750	1st in AFC Central	0	1	.000	Lost to Kansas City Chiefs in AFC Divisional Game
HOU	1994	1	9	0	.100	4th in AFC Central	-	-	-	-
HOU Total		43	31	0	.581		1	4	.200	
Total		87	77	0	.530		1	5	.167	

=== USFL ===
Team	Year	Regular season					Postseason			
Team	Year	Won	Lost	Ties	Win %	Finish	Won	Lost	Win %	Result
HOU	1984	13	5	0	.722	1st in Central Div.	0	1	.000	Lost to Arizona Wranglers in USFL Quarterfinals
HOU	1985	10	8	0	.556	3rd in Western Conf.	0	1	.000	Lost to Birmingham Stallions in USFL Quarterfinals
Total		23	13	0	.639		0	2	.000	

=== CFL ===
Team	Year	Regular season					Postseason			
Team	Year	Won	Lost	Ties	Win %	Finish	Won	Lost	Win %	Result
BIR	1995	10	8	0	.556	3rd in South Division	0	1	.000	Lost in Semifinals
Total		10	8	0	.556		0	1	.000	

=== College ===
Year	Team	Overall	Conference	Standing	Bowl/playoffs	AP^{#}
Houston Cougars (Southwest Conference) (1987–1989)
1987	Houston	4–6–1	2–4–1	7th		
1988	Houston	9–3	5–2	3rd	L Aloha	18
1989	Houston	9–2	6–2	T–2nd		14
Houston:		22–11–1	13–8–1			
Total:		22–11–1				
^{#}Rankings from final Coaches Poll.
