= Buddy Hardeman =

American football player (born 1954)

Profile
- Position: Running back

Personal information
- Born: October 21, 1954 (age 72); Auburn, New York, U.S.
- Listed height: 6 ft 0 in (1.83 m)
- Listed weight: 196 lb (89 kg)

Career information
- High school: Auburn
- College: Iowa State
- NFL draft: 1978: undrafted

Career history
- Toronto Argonauts (1978); Washington Redskins (1979–1980); Washington Federals (1983)
- Stats at Pro Football Reference

Willie Riley Hardeman Jr. (born October 21, 1954) is a former undrafted American football running back in the National Football League (NFL) for the Washington Redskins. Hardeman also played for the Toronto Argonauts of the Canadian Football League (CFL), and the Washington Federals of the United States Football League (USFL). He played college football at Iowa State University.

Hardeman was a dual threat quarterback at Iowa State University from 1973 to 1976.

In his 1978 season with the Argonauts, he caught four passes for 37 yards in addition to 12 yards on the ground.

He recorded a record called: A Bit Of The Bunch With Friends From The Start - Workin' Our Way Back To You (7") with Dave Butz and Monte Coleman.

Hardeman was also a member of the inaugural Washington Federals(USFL) squad in 1983, where he caught 18 passes for 114 yards.
