= Don Harris (gridiron football) =

American football player (born 1954)

No. 26, 37
- Position: Defensive back

Personal information
- Born: February 8, 1954 (age 72); Elizabeth, New Jersey, U.S.
- Listed height: 6 ft 2 in (1.88 m)
- Listed weight: 185 lb (84 kg)

Career information
- High school: Thomas Jefferson (Elizabeth)
- College: Rutgers
- NFL draft: 1977: 11th round, 300th overall pick

Career history
- Washington Redskins (1978–1979); New York Giants (1980); Montreal Alouettes (1981); Washington Federals (1983); New Jersey Generals (1983)

Career NFL statistics
- Fumble recoveries: 2
- Stats at Pro Football Reference

Donald Lesley Harris (born February 8, 1954) is an American former professional football player who was a safety in the National Football League (NFL) for the Washington Redskins and the New York Giants. He played college football for the Rutgers Scarlet Knights and was selected in the eleventh round of the 1977 NFL draft.
