= Ted Fritsch Jr. =

American football player (born 1950)

Ted Fritsch
No. 68, 66
- Position: Center

Personal information
- Born: August 26, 1950 (age 76); Green Bay, Wisconsin, U.S.
- Listed height: 6 ft 2 in (1.88 m)
- Listed weight: 242 lb (110 kg)

Career information
- High school: Premontre
- College: St. Norbert
- NFL draft: 1972: undrafted

Career history
- Atlanta Falcons (1972–1975); Washington Redskins (1976–1979)
- Stats at Pro Football Reference

Theodore Edward Fritsch Jr. (born August 26, 1950) is an American former professional football player who was a center in the National Football League (NFL). He played college football for the St. Norbert Green Knights. His father, Ted Fritsch, played for the Green Bay Packers in the 1940s. Fritsch played college football at St. Norbert College.
