= Mike Gibbons (American football) =

American football player (1951–2005)

No. 76, 79
- Positions: Offensive tackle, defensive tackle

Personal information
- Born: January 23, 1951; Duncan, Oklahoma, U.S.
- Died: November 29, 2005 (aged 54)
- Listed height: 6 ft 4 in (1.93 m)
- Listed weight: 262 lb (119 kg)

Career information
- College: SW Oklahoma State
- NFL draft: 1973: undrafted

Career history
- Dallas Cowboys (1973)*; Memphis Southmen (1974–1975); New York Giants (1976–1977)
- * Offseason or practice squad member only

Career NFL statistics
- Games played: 16
- Games started: 6
- Stats at Pro Football Reference

Michael Leslie Gibbons (January 23, 1951 – November 29, 2005) was an American professional football player. He played college football for SW Oklahoma State from 1969 to 1972 and professional football for the Dallas Cowboys (1973), Memphis Southmen (1974–1975), and New York Giants (1976–1977).

== Early life ==
Gibbons was born in 1951 in Duncan, Oklahoma. He attended Duncan High School in Oklahoma and Colorado High School in Colorado City, Texas. He played college football for Southwestern Oklahoma State from 1969 to 1972.

== Professional football ==
Gibbons signed with the Dallas Cowboys in 1973. He sustained a knee injury in July 1973 and underwent surgery.

In 1974, he signed with the Memphis Southmen of the World Football League (WFL). He started the first three games of the 1974 season at offensive tackle, but injured his foot. He returned in the fifth game and was released later in the season. He returned to Memphis in 1975, playing at both offensive tackle and defensive tackle.

In April 1976, after the WFL folded, eight former Memphis players, including Gibbons, joined the New York Giants. During the 1976 and 1977 seasons, he appeared in 16 games for the Giants, six of them as a starter.

== Later life ==
Gibbons died in 2005 at age 54 in Houston.
