= Phil DuBois =

American football player (born 1956)

No. 86
- Position: Tight end

Personal information
- Born: November 16, 1956 (age 69); Rochester, Minnesota

Career information
- College: San Diego State

Career history
- 1979–1980: Washington Redskins
- 1983: Washington Federals
- Stats at Pro Football Reference

Phillip Donn DuBois (born November 16, 1956) is an American former football tight end in the National Football League for the Washington Redskins. He also played for the Washington Federals of the United States Football League. DuBois played college football at San Diego State University. He attended Cerritos Junior College and Norwalk High School in southern California.
