= Ray Waddy =

American football player (born 1956)

No. 25, 47
- Position: Cornerback

Personal information
- Born: August 21, 1956 (age 70); Freeport, Texas, U.S.
- Listed height: 5 ft 11 in (1.80 m)
- Listed weight: 175 lb (79 kg)

Career information
- High school: Brazoswood (TX)
- College: Texas A&I
- NFL draft: 1979: undrafted

Career history
- Washington Redskins (1979–1980); St. Louis Cardinals (1982)*; BC Lions (1983); San Antonio Gunslingers (1984)
- * Offseason or practice squad member only

Career NFL statistics
- Interceptions: 1
- Stats at Pro Football Reference

Raymond Waddy Jr. (born August 21, 1956) is an American former professional football player who was a cornerback for the National Football League (NFL)'s Washington Redskins, the Canadian Football League (CFL)'s BC Lions and the United States Football League (USFL)'s San Antonio Gunslingers. He played college football and ran track for Texas A&I University (now Texas A&M University - Kingsville). He is currently a teacher and coach in the Brazosport Independent School District. He is a member of Omega Psi Phi fraternity.
