= Jeff Williams (offensive lineman) =

American football player (born 1955)

No. 62, 73, 72, 74
- Positions: Guard, tackle

Personal information
- Born: April 15, 1955 (age 71); Gloucester, Massachusetts, U.S.
- Listed height: 6 ft 4 in (1.93 m)
- Listed weight: 256 lb (116 kg)

Career information
- High school: Gloucester
- College: Rhode Island
- NFL draft: 1977: 5th round, 134th overall pick

Career history
- Los Angeles Rams (1977); Washington Redskins (1978–1980); San Diego Chargers (1981); Chicago Bears (1982)

Career NFL statistics
- Games played: 56
- Games started: 42
- Fumble recoveries: 1
- Stats at Pro Football Reference

Jeffrey Scott Williams (born April 15, 1955) is an American former professional football player who was an offensive lineman in the National Football League (NFL) for the Los Angeles Rams, Washington Redskins, San Diego Chargers, and the Chicago Bears. He played college football for the Rhode Island Rams.

== Early life ==
Williams was born in Gloucester, Massachusetts and attended Gloucester High School. While there, he played high school football as a tight end and defensive end. He was also a state champion hurdler.

== College career ==
Williams attended and played college football at the University of Rhode Island. After beginning his career as a tight end, he moved to offensive tackle and became a four-year letterman and four-year starter from 1973 to 1976.

== Professional career ==
Williams was selected in the fifth round of the 1977 NFL draft by the Los Angeles Rams. During his rookie season, he played only one game with the Rams before a knee injury ended his season. In 1978, the Rams traded him to the Washington Redskins for Eddie Brown. Williams, however, left Redskins training camp soon after the trade because he "didn't want to play football anymore." However, he returned during the 10th week of the season, and started the final seven games at offensive tackle as an injury replacement for George Starke. He was then moved to offensive guard, where he started for the Redskins in 1979 and 1980. In 1981, Williams was traded to the San Diego Chargers for defensive lineman Wilbur Young. Williams was then traded to the Chicago Bears for draft picks in 1982, where he finished his career.

== Personal life ==
Williams is the son of Ted Williams, who also played in the NFL for the Philadelphia Eagles and Boston Yanks.
