= Karl Lorch =

American football player (1950–2013)

No. 71
- Position: Defensive end

Personal information
- Born: June 14, 1950; Honolulu, Hawaii, U.S.
- Died: September 23, 2013 (aged 63)

Career information
- High school: Kamehameha Schools (Honolulu, Hawaii)
- College: Southern California
- NFL draft: 1973: 9th round, 234 (by the Miami Dolphins)th overall pick

Career history
- 1974–1975: The Hawaiians
- 1976–1981: Washington Redskins
- 1983: Chicago Blitz
- 1984: Arizona Wranglers
- 1985: Arizona Outlaws

Awards and highlights
- National champion (1972); All-WFL (1975); All-USFL (1984)
- Stats at Pro Football Reference

Karl P. Lorch Jr. (June 14, 1950 – September 23, 2013) was an American professional football player. He played as a defensive end with the Washington Redskins of the National Football League (NFL) for six seasons. He also played in the World Football League (WFL) for The Hawaiians and the United States Football League (USFL) for the Chicago Blitz, Arizona Wranglers and Arizona Outlaws. Lorch wore #71 for the Washington Redskins.

== Professional career ==
Lorch was selected 234th overall by the Miami Dolphins in the ninth round of the 1973 NFL draft.
