= Doc Urich =

American football player and coach (1928–1997)

Biographical details
- Born: September 20, 1928; Toledo, Ohio, U.S.
- Died: April 28, 1997 (aged 68); Maumee, Ohio, U.S.

Playing career
- 1947–1950: Miami (OH)
- Position: End

Coaching career (HC unless noted)
- 1951–1955: Miami (OH) (assistant)
- 1956–1963: Northwestern (assistant)
- 1964–1965: Notre Dame (assistant)
- 1966–1968: Buffalo
- 1969–1970: Northern Illinois
- 1971: Buffalo Bills (DC)
- 1972–1975: Denver Broncos (DL)
- 1976: Denver Broncos (OL)
- 1978–1980: Washington Redskins (DC)
- 1981–1983: Green Bay Packers (DL)
- 1984: Denver Broncos (ST)
- 1985: Denver Broncos](TE/AOL)

Head coaching record
- Overall: 24–26

Richard Weldon "Doc" Urich (September 20, 1928 – April 28, 1997) was an American football player and coach. He served as the head football coach at University at Buffalo from 1966 to 1968 and at Northern Illinois University from 1969 to 1970, compiling a career record of 24–26.

== Coaching career ==
For 16 years, starting in 1951, Urich was an assistant coach to Ara Parseghian at Miami University, Northwestern University and the University of Notre Dame. In 1966, Urich became the head coach at the University at Buffalo. In 1969, Urich became the head coach and at Northern Illinois University. Urich was the 12th head football coach for the Huskies and he held that position for two seasons, from 1969 until 1970. His record at Northern Illinois was 6–14. Urich spent 15 years as an assistant coach in the National Football League (NFL) with the Buffalo Bills, Denver Broncos, Washington Redskins, and Green Bay Packers.

== Death ==
Urich died in 1997 of a heart attack.

== Head coaching record ==
Year	Team	Overall	Conference	Standing	Bowl/playoffs
Buffalo Bulls (NCAA University Division independent) (1966–1968)
1966	Buffalo	5–5			
1967	Buffalo	6–4			
1968	Buffalo	7–3			
Buffalo:		18–12			
Northern Illinois Huskies (NCAA University Division independent) (1969–1970)
1969	Northern Illinois	3–7			
1970	Northern Illinois	3–7			
Northern Illinois:		6–14			
Total:		24–26			
