= Pete Wysocki =

American football player (1948–2003)

No. 53, 47, 60, 50
- Position: Linebacker

Personal information
- Born: October 3, 1948; Detroit, Michigan, U.S.
- Died: June 14, 2003 (aged 54); Vienna, Virginia, U.S.
- Listed height: 6 ft 2 in (1.88 m)
- Listed weight: 225 lb (102 kg)

Career information
- High school: Garden City (Garden City, Michigan)
- College: Western Michigan (1965-1968)
- NFL draft: 1969: undrafted

Career history
- Norfolk Neptunes (1970); Hamilton Tiger-Cats (1971); Toronto Argonauts (1972); Saskatchewan Roughriders (1973–1974); Washington Redskins (1975–1980)

Awards and highlights
- CFL All-Star (1974)

Career NFL statistics
- Fumble recoveries: 3
- Interceptions: 1
- Sacks: 2
- Stats at Pro Football Reference

Peter Joseph Wysocki (October 3, 1948 – June 14, 2003) was an American professional football linebacker who played his entire six-year career with the Washington Redskins from 1975 to 1980 in the National Football League (NFL). Wysocki previously played four seasons in the Canadian Football League (CFL) for the Hamilton Tiger-Cats, Toronto Argonauts and Saskatchewan Roughriders.

== Early life ==
Wysocki was born in Detroit, Michigan, and attended Garden City East High School.

== College career ==
Wysocki attended and played college football at Western Michigan University. In 1968, he was a second-team All-Mid-American Conference selection. He was named to the Western Michigan Broncos football All-Century Team in 2005.

== Professional career ==
=== CFL ===
After going undrafted, Wysocki played for four seasons in the Canadian Football League for the Hamilton Tiger-Cats, Toronto Argonauts and Saskatchewan Roughriders. In his final season with the Roughriders, he was named a CFL All-Star.

=== NFL ===
After a successful career in the CFL, Wysocki was signed in 1975 by the Washington Redskins of the National Football League. He was the third CFL player signed by Redskins head coach George Allen, the other two being Joe Theismann and Moses Denson. Wysocki played his entire six-year NFL career with the Redskins. In 88 games, he recovered three fumbles and intercepted one pass. Pete was a force on the special teams and was called "The Missile."

== After football ==
After retiring from football, Wysocki became an advertising salesman for WMAL. He then became a successful real estate broker in Washington, D.C. He also worked at Transwestern as Vice President of Office Leasing. During his tenure at Transwestern, Wysocki was recognized by the Washington Association of Realtors for the Commercial Transaction of the Year in 1988 and won the Top Producer award from the Washington Area Commercial Brokers Council in 1991.

== Personal life ==
Wysocki was married twice. In 1999, he was diagnosed with non-Hodgkin's lymphoma. After intensive chemotherapy, he became a public speaker regarding his illness, and spoke at Leukemia Society functions and similar organizations to help raise money for research. He died in 2003 in Vienna, Virginia.
