= Perry Brooks =

American football player (1954–2010)

No. 69
- Position: Defensive tackle

Personal information
- Born: December 4, 1954; Bogalusa, Louisiana, U.S.
- Died: March 1, 2010 (aged 55); Woodbridge, Virginia, U.S.
- Listed height: 6 ft 6 in (1.98 m)
- Listed weight: 285 lb (129 kg)

Career information
- High school: Angie (LA) Wesley Ray
- College: Southern
- NFL draft: 1976: 7th round, 202nd overall pick

Career history
- Washington Redskins (1977–1984)

Awards and highlights
- Super Bowl champion (XVII)

Career NFL statistics
- Sacks: 27
- Fumble recoveries: 4
- Stats at Pro Football Reference

Perry Brooks (December 4, 1954 – March 1, 2010) was an American professional football defensive tackle in the National Football League (NFL) who played for the Washington Redskins. He played college football at Southern University and was selected by the New England Patriots in the seventh round of the 1976 NFL draft with the 202nd overall pick. He is the father of linebacker Ahmad Brooks.

After his career ended, Brooks served as a salesman at Cowles Nissan in Woodbridge, Virginia.
