= Ike Forte =

American football player (born 1954)

No. 38, 30, 35
- Position: Running back

Personal information
- Born: March 8, 1954 (age 72); Texarkana, Arkansas, U.S.
- Listed height: 6 ft 0 in (1.83 m)
- Listed weight: 203 lb (92 kg)

Career information
- High school: Texas (Texarkana)
- College: Arkansas
- NFL draft: 1976: 2nd round, 35th overall pick

Career history
- New England Patriots (1976–1977); Washington Redskins (1978–1980); New York Giants (1981)

Awards and highlights
- 2× First-team All-SWC (1974, 1975)

Career NFL statistics
- Rushing attempts: 165
- Rushing yards: 511
- Rushing TDs: 5
- Stats at Pro Football Reference

Donald Roy "Ike" Forte (born March 8, 1954) is an American former professional football player who was a running back in the National Football League (NFL) for the New England Patriots, Washington Redskins, and New York Giants. He played college football at the Arkansas Razorbacks and was selected in the second round of the 1976 NFL draft.

== College career ==
Forte began his college career with the Tyler Junior College, playing two seasons. He earned junior college All-America honors in his sophomore season when he ran for 1,175 yards.

Next moving to Arkansas, Forte was the leading rusher for the team in his junior and senior seasons, earning All-Southwest Conference honors in both 1974 and 1975. He had eight 100-yard games rushing and finished as the third best rusher in team history to that point.

In 1975, Forte was a co-captain and a key player in the Hogs winning the Southwest Conference title and, in his last college game, he led the team in a 31–10 upset of the Georgia Bulldogs in the 1976 Cotton Bowl Classic. In that game, he rushed for 119 yards and two touchdowns, earning the game's Most Outstanding Offensive Player award.

== Professional career ==
Forte began his journeyman career in the National Football League with the New England Patriots after being drafted by them in the second round with the 38th overall pick in the 1976 NFL draft. In his career, Forte scored seven touchdowns while gaining 511 rushing yards on 165 carries and 387 receiving yards on 39 receptions.
