= Dick Daniels =

American football player and executive (born 1944)

No. 45, 21, 23
- Position: Defensive back

Personal information
- Born: October 19, 1944 (age 82); Portland, Oregon, U.S.
- Listed height: 5 ft 9 in (1.75 m)
- Listed weight: 180 lb (82 kg)

Career information
- High school: Jefferson (Portland)
- College: Pacific (1964-1965)
- NFL draft: 1966: undrafted

Career history

Playing
- Dallas Cowboys (1966–1968); Chicago Bears (1969–1970); Miami Dolphins (1971)

Operations
- Miami Dolphins (1972–1974) Scout; Tampa Bay Buccaneers (1975) Chief talent scout; San Francisco 49ers (1976–1977) Scout; Washington Redskins (1978–1983) Director of college scouting; Los Angeles Express (1984) Vice president for personnel; Washington Redskins (1986–1989) Director of player personnel; San Diego Chargers (1990–1995) Assistant general manager; Philadelphia Eagles (1996–1997) Director of football operations

Awards and highlights
- 2× All-Northwest Conference (1964, 1965)

Career NFL statistics
- Interceptions: 7
- Fumble recoveries: 2
- Sacks: 1
- Stats at Pro Football Reference

Richard Bernard Daniels (born October 19, 1944) is an American former professional football player who was a defensive back in the National Football League (NFL) for the Dallas Cowboys and Chicago Bears. He played college football for the Pacific Boxers.

== Early life ==
Daniels attended Jefferson High School, where he was an honorable-mention All-PIL halfback and a part of two football championship teams. He also contributed to his school winning a track championship team.

He accepted a football scholarship from Pacific University, where he practiced football and track. He was a two-time conference champion in the long jump.

In 1995, he was inducted into the Pacific University Athletic Hall of Fame.

=== Dallas Cowboys ===
Daniels was signed as an undrafted free agent by the Dallas Cowboys after the 1966 NFL draft. On September 29, he was placed on the taxi squad, before being activated to play in 4 games. He was a part of the 1967 NFL Championship Game known as the "Ice Bowl".

In 1968, he was out for 4 weeks after being injured in pre-season, but came back to move Mel Renfro to right cornerback and start 6 games at free safety. He was waived on September 18, 1969.

=== Chicago Bears ===
In 1969, he was signed to the Chicago Bears taxi squad, before being promoted to the active roster on November 1. The next year, he started 13 games at free safety. On August 26, 1971, he was released after being passed on the depth chart by Jerry Moore.

=== Miami Dolphins ===
August 26, 1971, he was claimed off waivers by the Miami Dolphins. He was placed on the injured reserve list on September 13.

== Personal life ==
In 1972, he was hired as a scout by the Miami Dolphins. In 1975, he was hired as the Tampa Bay Buccaneers Chief Talent Scout. In 1984, he was vice president for personnel for the Los Angeles Express. He was the director of player personnel for the Washington Redskins. In 1996, he was named director of football operations for the Philadelphia Eagles. He was a consultant with Football Operations and NFL Ventures.
