= Clarence Harmon (American football) =

American football player (born 1955)

No. 38
- Position: Running back

Personal information
- Born: November 30, 1955 (age 70); Kosciusko, Mississippi, U.S.
- Listed height: 5 ft 11 in (1.80 m)
- Listed weight: 209 lb (95 kg)

Career information
- High school: Kosciusko
- College: Mississippi State
- NFL draft: 1977: undrafted

Career history
- Washington Redskins (1977–1982); New Jersey Generals (1984–1985)

Awards and highlights
- Super Bowl champion (XVII)
- Stats at Pro Football Reference

Clarence Harmon Jr. (born November 30, 1955) is an American former professional football player who was a running back for the Washington Redskins of the National Football League (NFL). He played college football for the Mississippi State Bulldogs.

Harmon graduated from Kosciusko High School in 1973. Following his graduation, Harmon played football at Holmes Community College and Mississippi State University before being selected in the 1977 NFL draft by the Washington Redskins. After participation in Super Bowl XVII, he became a science teacher at Jim Hill High School, before settling in Tupelo, Mississippi. He went on to Coach Football at North Pontotoc High School, Bruce High School (2003 and 2004 MHSAA Region 2-2A Champions), and Clarksdale High School.
