= Bob Kuziel =

American football player (born 1950)

No. 67, 54
- Position: Center

Personal information
- Born: July 24, 1950 (age 76); New Haven, Connecticut, U.S.
- Listed height: 6 ft 4 in (1.93 m)
- Listed weight: 255 lb (116 kg)

Career information
- High school: Fayetteville–Manlius
- College: Pittsburgh
- NFL draft: 1972: 3rd round, 60th overall pick

Career history
- New Orleans Saints (1972); Charlotte Hornets (1974); Washington Redskins (1975–1980)

Awards and highlights
- First-team All-East (1971)

Career NFL statistics
- Games played: 90
- Games started: 45
- Stats at Pro Football Reference

Robert Charles Kuziel (born July 24, 1950) is an American former professional football player who was an offensive lineman in the National Football League (NFL) for the New Orleans Saints and the Washington Redskins. He played college football for the Pittsburgh Panthers and was selected in the third round of the 1972 NFL draft. Kuziel also played for the Charlotte Hornets of the World Football League (WFL).

== Washington Redskins ==
In 1978, he replaced long-time veteran Len Hauss as the starting center for the Washington Redskins and played at that position for 3 seasons, up to 1980, his final year, when he started for 13 games. In 1981, he was replaced by Jeff Bostic.
