= John McDaniel (American football) =

American football player (born 1951)

No. 86, 80
- Position: Wide receiver

Personal information
- Born: September 23, 1951 (age 75); Birmingham, Alabama, U.S.
- Listed height: 6 ft 1 in (1.85 m)
- Listed weight: 193 lb (88 kg)

Career information
- High school: Wenonah (Birmingham)
- College: Lincoln
- NFL draft: 1974: 8th round, 202nd overall pick

Career history
- Cincinnati Bengals (1974–1977); Washington Redskins (1978–1980)

Career NFL statistics
- Receptions: 99
- Receiving yards: 1,547
- Receiving TDs: 7
- Stats at Pro Football Reference

John McDaniel (born September 23, 1951) is an American former professional football player who was a wide receiver in the National Football League (NFL) for the Cincinnati Bengals and Washington Redskins. He played college football for the Lincoln Blue Tigers and was selected in the eighth round of the 1974 NFL draft.
