= George Dickson =

American football player and coach (1921–2020)

Profile
- Position: Quarterback

Personal information
- Born: September 27, 1921; Boston, Massachusetts, U.S.
- Died: November 25, 2020 (aged 99); California, U.S.

Career information
- High school: South Pasadena High School
- College: Notre Dame

Career history
- 1952: NYU (assistant)
- 1953: Mount Carmel HS (IL) (assistant)
- 1954: Notre Dame (backfield)
- 1955: Dayton (backfield)
- 1956: Marquette (backfield)
- 1957: USC (backfield)
- 1958–1960: Pacific (CA) (assistant)
- 1961: Oakland Raiders (DB)
- 1962–1963: Oklahoma (assistant)
- 1964–1965: Denver Broncos (assistant)
- 1966: Atlanta Falcons (OB)
- 1967–1968: New Orleans Saints (OB)
- 1969: Washington Redskins (OB)
- 1971: Houston Oilers (OB)
- 1972–1975: San Diego Chargers (OB/ST)
- 1976: Hamilton Tiger-Cats (head coach)
- 1977: San Bernardino Valley (assistant)
- 1978: Washington Redskins (OB)
- 1979–80: Washington Redskins (LB)
- 1982–83: Michigan Panthers (OB)

Awards and highlights
- National champion (1949)

George Charles Dickson Jr. (September 27, 1921 – November 25, 2020) was an American gridiron football player and coach was the head coach of the Hamilton Tiger-Cats of the Canadian Football League (CFL) for the first two games of the 1976 season.

== Early life ==
Dickson was born in September 1921 in Boston, Massachusetts and grew up in South Pasadena, California. He was a star quarterback at South Pasadena High School and in 1940 joined the Notre Dame Fighting Irish football team.

=== Military ===
After his freshman season, Dickson enlisted as a paratrooper. He saw extensive action during the war, including combat in Normandy on D-Day. Following the fighting in Normandy, Sgt. Dickson and his unit moved to the Ardennes. There, they were battered by constant bombing by German artillery during the Battle of the Bulge.

He returned to Notre Dame in 1946, but dropped out in order to work full-time. He returned to Notre Dame again in 1948 and spent his final two seasons of eligibility as a reserve quarterback behind Frank Tripucka and Bob Williams.

Sgt. George Dickson received the Admiral Thomas J. Hamilton Award from the All-American Football Foundation in 2006.

== Coaching career ==
Dickson began his coaching career in 1952 as an assistant at NYU. The football program was disbanded after his first season there and after spending the 1953 season as an assistant at Mount Carmel High School in Chicago, Dickson rejoined his NYU boss Hugh Devore at Dayton. Dickson's time at Dayton was short-lived as one month later he left Dayton to become the backfield coach at his alma mater, Notre Dame. After only one season, Dickson left Notre Dame and returned to Dayton.

After stints at Marquette, USC, Pacific, and Tulane, Dickson joined the pro ranks as an assistant with the Oakland Raiders of the American Football League. He returned to college football in 1962 as an assistant at Oklahoma.

In 1976, Dickson received his first head coaching position when he was hired by the CFL's Hamilton Tiger-Cats. After the Tiger-Cats lost all four of their preseason games and their first two regular season games under Dickson, General Manager Bob Shaw fired him and succeeded him as head coach.

After his firing, Dickson served as an assistant coach at San Bernardino Valley College. He returned to the NFL in 1978 as the Washington Redskins' offensive backfield coach.

Dickson died in California in November 2020 at the age of 99.

== Head coaching record ==
Team	Year	Regular season					Postseason		
Team	Year	Won	Lost	Ties	Win %	Finish	Won	Lost	Result
HAM	1976	0	2	0	.000	4th in East Division	0	0	Fired
Total		0	2	0	.000		0	0	
