= Dan Nugent =

American football player (1953–2001)

No. 62
- Position: Guard

Personal information
- Born: August 22, 1953; Mount Clemens, Michigan, U.S.
- Died: October 18, 2001 (aged 48); Boca Raton, Florida, U.S.
- Listed height: 6 ft 3 in (1.91 m)
- Listed weight: 250 lb (113 kg)

Career information
- High school: Pompano Beach (FL)
- College: Auburn
- NFL draft: 1975: 3rd round, 67 (by the Los Angeles Rams)th overall pick

Career history
- Washington Redskins (1976–1980)

Career NFL statistics
- Games played: 58
- Games started: 24
- Fumble recoveries: 1
- Stats at Pro Football Reference

Daniel Lawrence Nugent (August 22, 1953 – October 18, 2001) was an American professional football offensive lineman in the National Football League (NFL) for the Washington Redskins. He played college football at Auburn University.

== Early life ==
Nugent was born in Mount Clemens, Michigan, and then moved to Florida. He attended Pompano Beach High School, where he played football as a tight end and defensive lineman from 1968 to 1970.

== College career ==
Nugent attended and played college football at Auburn University, where he played tight end before moving to guard.

== Professional career ==
Nugent was selected in the third round of the 1975 NFL draft by the Los Angeles Rams. He was then traded to the Washington Redskins in 1976 for second and third round draft picks. He played for the Redskins from 1976 to 1980, before being cut during the 1981 offseason due to a herniated disc.

== Personal life ==
Nugent married his wife, Lauren, in 1985. He sold knee and hip implant supplies for Howmedica Osteonics of South Florida. He died on October 18, 2001, in Boca Raton, Florida, from leukemia.
