= Terry Hermeling =

American football player (born 1946)

No. 63, 72, 75
- Position: Offensive tackle

Personal information
- Born: April 25, 1946 (age 80); Santa Maria, California, U.S.
- Listed height: 6 ft 5 in (1.96 m)
- Listed weight: 255 lb (116 kg)

Career information
- High school: Santa Maria
- College: Nevada
- NFL draft: 1970: undrafted

Career history
- Washington Redskins (1970–1980)

Awards and highlights
- 90 Greatest Commanders

Career NFL statistics
- Games played: 120
- Games started: 103
- Fumble recoveries: 5
- Stats at Pro Football Reference

Terry Allen Hermeling (born April 25, 1946) is an American former professional football player who was an offensive lineman for the Washington Redskins of the National Football League (NFL). He played college football for the Nevada Wolf Pack. Hermeling helped the Redskins win the 1972 NFC championship and lead the NFC in yards passing in 1975.
