= 1973 Washington Redskins season =

NFL team season

- Owner: Edward Bennett Williams
- General manager: George Allen
- President: Edward Bennett Williams
- Head coach: George Allen
- Offensive coordinator: Ted Marchibroda
- Defensive coordinator: LaVern Torgeson
- Home stadium: RFK Stadium

Results
- Record: 10–4
- Division place: 2nd NFC East
- Playoffs: Lost Divisional Playoffs (at Vikings) 20–27
- Pro Bowlers: RB Herb Mul-Key; WR Charley Taylor; SS Ken Houston; RLB Chris Hanburger

The 1973 Washington Redskins season was the franchise's 42nd season in the National Football League (NFL) and their 37th in Washington, D.C. The team failed to improve on their 11–3 record from 1972, finishing 10–4; it was the first time the Redskins had consecutive ten-win seasons in franchise history.

In the Divisional playoff, the Minnesota Vikings defeated the Redskins 27–20.

== Offseason ==
=== Draft ===
1973 Washington Redskins draft
Round	Pick	Player	Position	College	Notes
5	117	Charley Cantrell	Guard	Lamar	
6	193	Mike Hancock	Tight end	Idaho State	
Made roster † Pro Football Hall of Fame * Made at least one Pro Bowl during career

== Roster ==
1973 Washington Redskins roster
Quarterbacks (QB): 9 Sonny Jurgensen; 17 Billy Kilmer; Running backs (RB): 43 Larry Brown; 26 Bob Brunet; 31 Charley Harraway; 25 Mike Hull; 28 Herb Mul-Key; 47 Duane Thomas; Wide receivers (WR): 46 Frank Grant; 80 Roy Jefferson; 24 Bill Malinchak; 42 Charley Taylor; Tight ends (TE): 84 Mike Hancock; 87 Jerry Smith	Offensive linemen (OL): 56 Len Hauss C; 75 Terry Hermeling T; 73 Paul Laaveg G; 51 Dan Ryczek C; 62 Ray Schoenke G/T; 74 George Starke T; 60 John Wilbur G; Defensive linemen (DL): 86 Verlon Biggs DE; 77 Bill Brundige DT; 85 Willie Holman DE; 79 Ron McDole DE; 64 Manny Sistrunk DT; 72 Diron Talbert DT	Linebackers (LB): 55 Chris Hanburger OLB; 52 John Pergine OLB; 66 Myron Pottios MLB; 89 Dave Robinson OLB; 67 Rusty Tillman MLB; Defensive backs (DB): 41 Mike Bass CB; 45 Speedy Duncan CB/S; 37 Pat Fischer CB; 27 Ken Houston FS; 23 Brig Owens SS; 20 Ken Stone FS; Special teams (ST): 4 Mike Bragg P; 5 Curt Knight K	Practice squad: 59 Brad Dusek LB; 40 Fred Hyatt WR; 53 Harold McLinton LB; 18 Sam Wyche QB; Reserve: 68 Charlie Cantrell G (IR); 44 Moses Denson RB (IR); 48 Jon Jaqua S (IR); 69 Dennis Johnson DT (IR); 82 Jimmie Jones DE (IR); -- George Nock RB (IR); 16 Richie Petitbon S (IR); 88 Alvin Reed TE (IR); 76 Walt Rock T (IR); 22 Roosevelt Taylor S (IR); 29 Ted Vactor CB (IR); 38 Larry Willis S (IR); Rookies in italics

== Preseason ==
=== Schedule ===
Week	Date	Opponent	Result	Record	Venue	Attendance	Recap
1	August 3	Detroit Lions	L 14–17	0–1	RFK Stadium	53,041	
2	August 10	Denver Broncos	W 14–10	1–1	RFK Stadium	38,923	
3	August 17	at Buffalo Bills	W 37–21	2–1	Rich Stadium	80,020	
4	August 25	Baltimore Colts	W 20–3	3–1	RFK Stadium	53,497	
5	September 2	at New England Patriots	W 35–14	4–1	Schaefer Stadium	50,369	
6	September 9	Chicago Bears	W 17–3	5–1	RFK Stadium	54,137	

== Pre season Game summaries ==
=== Week P1 (Friday, August 3, 1973): vs. Detroit Lions ===
Preseason Week 1: Detroit Lions 17 at Washington Redskins 14 – Game summary

Quarter	1	2	3	4	Total
Lions	0	14	0	3	17
Redskins	0	7	0	7	14

at RFK Stadium • Washington, D.C.

- Date: August 3, 1973
- Game time: 8:00 p.m. EDT
- Game attendance: 53,041
- TV: WMAL-TV

Team	Category	Player	Statistics
DET	Passing		
DET	Rushing		
DET	Receiving		
WAS	Passing		
WAS	Rushing		
WAS	Receiving		

Scoring summary

Quarter	Time	Drive			Team	Scoring information	Score	
Quarter	Time	Plays	Yards	TOP	Team	Scoring information	DET	WAS
"TOP" = time of possession. For other American football terms, see Glossary of American football.							33	3

- Time of game:

Lions	Game statistics	Redskins
	First downs	
	Rushes–yards	
	Passing yards	
	Passes	
	Sacked–yards	
	Net passing yards	
	Total yards	
	Return yards	
	Punts	
	Fumbles–lost	
	Penalties–yards	

=== Week P2 (Friday, August 10, 1973): vs. Denver Broncos ===
Preseason Week 2: Denver Broncos 10 at Washington Redskins 14 – Game summary

Quarter	1	2	3	4	Total
Broncos	7	7	0	0	14
Redskins	0	7	0	7	14

at RFK Stadium • Washington, D.C.

- Date: August 10, 1973
- Game time: 8:05 p.m. EDT
- Game attendance: 38,923
- Referee: Bernie Ulman
- TV: WMAL-TV

Team	Category	Player	Statistics
DEN	Passing		
DEN	Rushing		
DEN	Receiving		
WAS	Passing		
WAS	Rushing		
WAS	Receiving		

Scoring summary

Quarter	Time	Drive			Team	Scoring information	Score	
Quarter	Time	Plays	Yards	TOP	Team	Scoring information	DEN	WAS
"TOP" = time of possession. For other American football terms, see Glossary of American football.							10	14

- Time of game: 2 hours, 43 minutes

Broncos	Game statistics	Redskins
	First downs	
	Rushes–yards	
	Passing yards	
	Passes	
	Sacked–yards	
	Net passing yards	
	Total yards	
	Return yards	
	Punts	
	Fumbles–lost	
	Penalties–yards	

=== Week P3 (Friday, August 17, 1973): at Buffalo Bills ===
Preseason Week 3: Washington Redskins 37 at Buffalo Bills 21 – Game summary

Quarter	1	2	3	4	Total
Redskins	17	14	3	3	37
Bills	0	14	0	7	21

at Rich Stadium • Orchard Park, New York

- Date: August 17, 1973
- Game time: 7:30 p.m. EDT
- Game attendance: 80,020
- Referee: Tom Bell
- TV: WMAL-TV

Team	Category	Player	Statistics
WAS	Passing		
WAS	Rushing		
WAS	Receiving		
BUF	Passing		
BUF	Rushing		
BUF	Receiving		

Scoring summary

Quarter	Time	Drive			Team	Scoring information	Score	
Quarter	Time	Plays	Yards	TOP	Team	Scoring information	WAS	BUF
"TOP" = time of possession. For other American football terms, see Glossary of American football.							37	21

- Time of game:

Redskins	Game statistics	Bills
	First downs	
	Rushes–yards	
	Passing yards	
	Passes	
	Sacked–yards	
	Net passing yards	
	Total yards	
	Return yards	
	Punts	
	Fumbles–lost	
	Penalties–yards	

=== Week P4 (Saturday, August 25, 1973): vs. Baltimore Colts ===
Preseason Week 4: Baltimore Colts 3 at Washington Redskins 20 – Game summary

Quarter	1	2	3	4	Total
Colts	3	0	0	0	3
Redskins	3	10	7	0	20

at RFK Stadium • Washington, D.C.

- Date: August 25, 1973
- Game time: 8:00 p.m. EDT
- Game attendance: 53,497
- TV: WMAL-TV

Team	Category	Player	Statistics
BAL	Passing		
BAL	Rushing		
BAL	Receiving		
WAS	Passing		
WAS	Rushing		
WAS	Receiving		

Scoring summary

Quarter	Time	Drive			Team	Scoring information	Score	
Quarter	Time	Plays	Yards	TOP	Team	Scoring information	BAL	WAS
"TOP" = time of possession. For other American football terms, see Glossary of American football.							3	20

- Time of game:

Colts	Game statistics	Redskins
	First downs	
	Rushes–yards	
	Passing yards	
	Passes	
	Sacked–yards	
	Net passing yards	
	Total yards	
	Return yards	
	Punts	
	Fumbles–lost	
	Penalties–yards	

=== Week P5 (Sunday, September 2, 1973): at New England Patriots ===
Preseason Week 5: Washington Redskins 35 at New England Patriots 14 – Game summary

Quarter	1	2	3	4	Total
Redskins	0	7	14	14	35
Patriots	7	7	0	0	14

at Schaefer Stadium • Orchard Park, New York

- Date: September 2, 1973
- Game time: 8:30 p.m. EDT
- Game attendance: 50,369
- Referee: Bernie Ulman
- TV: WMAL-TV

Team	Category	Player	Statistics
WAS	Passing		
WAS	Rushing		
WAS	Receiving		
NE	Passing		
NE	Rushing		
NE	Receiving		

Scoring summary

Quarter	Time	Drive			Team	Scoring information	Score	
Quarter	Time	Plays	Yards	TOP	Team	Scoring information	WAS	NE
"TOP" = time of possession. For other American football terms, see Glossary of American football.							35	14

- Time of game: 2 hours, 41 minutes

Redskins	Game statistics	Patriots
	First downs	
	Rushes–yards	
	Passing yards	
	Passes	
	Sacked–yards	
	Net passing yards	
	Total yards	
	Return yards	
	Punts	
	Fumbles–lost	
	Penalties–yards	

=== Week P6 (Sunday, September 9, 1973): vs. Chicago Bears ===
Preseason Week 6: Chicago Bears 3 at Washington Redskins 17 – Game summary

Quarter	1	2	3	4	Total
Bears	0	0	0	3	3
Redskins	7	7	0	3	17

at RFK Stadium • Washington, D.C.

- Date: September 9, 1973
- Game time: 8:30 p.m. EDT
- Game attendance: 54,137
- TV: CBS

Team	Category	Player	Statistics
CHI	Passing		
CHI	Rushing		
CHI	Receiving		
WAS	Passing		
WAS	Rushing		
WAS	Receiving		

Scoring summary

Quarter	Time	Drive			Team	Scoring information	Score	
Quarter	Time	Plays	Yards	TOP	Team	Scoring information	CHI	WAS
"TOP" = time of possession. For other American football terms, see Glossary of American football.							3	17

- Time of game:

Bears	Game statistics	Redskins
	First downs	
	Rushes–yards	
	Passing yards	
	Passes	
	Sacked–yards	
	Net passing yards	
	Total yards	
	Return yards	
	Punts	
	Fumbles–lost	
	Penalties–yards	

== Regular season ==
=== Schedule ===
Week	Date	Opponent	Result	Record	Venue	Attendance	Recap
1	September 16	San Diego Chargers	**W** 38–0	1–0	RFK Stadium	52,718	Recap
2	September 23	at **St. Louis Cardinals**	**L** 27–34	1–1	Busch Memorial Stadium	50,316	Recap
3	September 30	at **Philadelphia Eagles**	**W** 28–7	2–1	Veterans Stadium	64,147	Recap
4	October 8	**Dallas Cowboys**	**W** 14–7	3–1	RFK Stadium	54,314	Recap
5	October 14	at **New York Giants**	**W** 21–3	4–1	Yale Bowl	70,168	Recap
6	October 21	**St. Louis Cardinals**	**W** 31–13	5–1	RFK Stadium	54,381	Recap
7	October 28	at New Orleans Saints	**L** 3–19	5–2	Tulane Stadium	66,315	Recap
8	November 5	at Pittsburgh Steelers	**L** 16–21	5–3	Three Rivers Stadium	49,220	Recap
9	November 11	San Francisco 49ers	**W** 33–9	6–3	RFK Stadium	54,381	Recap
10	November 18	Baltimore Colts	**W** 22–14	7–3	RFK Stadium	52,675	Recap
11	November 22	at Detroit Lions	**W** 20–0	8–3	Tiger Stadium	46,807	Recap
12	December 2	**New York Giants**	**W** 27–24	9–3	RFK Stadium	53,590	Recap
13	December 9	at **Dallas Cowboys**	**L** 7–27	9–4	Texas Stadium	62,195	Recap
14	December 16	**Philadelphia Eagles**	**W** 38–20	10–4	RFK Stadium	49,484	Recap
Note: Intra-division opponents are in **bold** text.

=== Standings ===
NFC East
	W	L	T	PCT	DIV	CONF	PF	PA	STK
Dallas Cowboys	10	4	0	.714	6–2	8–3	382	203	W3
Washington Redskins	10	4	0	.714	6–2	8–3	325	198	W1
Philadelphia Eagles	5	8	1	.393	3–4–1	3–7–1	310	393	L1
St. Louis Cardinals	4	9	1	.321	3–5	4–7	286	365	L1
New York Giants	2	11	1	.179	1–6–1	1–9–1	226	362	L4

== Regular Season Game summaries ==
=== Week 1 (Sunday, September 16, 1973): vs. San Diego Chargers ===
Week 1: San Diego Chargers 0 at Washington Redskins 38 – Game summary

Quarter	1	2	3	4	Total
Chargers (0–1)	0	0	0	0	0
Redskins (1–0)	21	0	7	10	38

at RFK Stadium • Washington, D.C.

- Date: September 16, 1973
- Game time: 1:00 p.m. EDT
- Game weather: 73 °F (23 °C); relative humidity 59%; wind 6 miles per hour (9.7 km/h; 5.2 kn) (Scattered Clouds)
- Game attendance: 52,718
- Referee: Norm Schachter
- TV announcers (NBC): Jim Simpson (play-by-play) and Kyle Rote (color commentator)

Team	Category	Player	Statistics
SD	Passing	Johnny Unitas	6/17, 55 YDS, 3 INTs
SD	Rushing	Cid Edwards	14 CAR, 63 YDS
SD	Receiving	Gary Garrison	2 REC, 36 YDS
WAS	Passing	Billy Kilmer	10/18, 129 YDS, 2 TDs
WAS	Rushing	Duane Thomas	12 CAR, 30 YDS
WAS	Receiving	Charley Taylor	3 REC, 60 YDS, 1 TD

Scoring summary

Quarter	Time	Drive			Team	Scoring information	Score	
Quarter	Time	Plays	Yards	TOP	Team	Scoring information	SD	WAS
1			—	—	Redskins	Fumble recovery returned 2 yards for touchdown by Biggs, Knight kick good	0	7
1					Redskins	Brown 1-yard touchdown run, Knight kick good	0	14
1			—	—	Redskins	Fumble recovery returned 36 yards for touchdown by Owens, Knight kick good	0	21
3					Redskins	Taylor 32-yard touchdown reception from Kilmer, Knight kick good	0	28
4					Redskins	19-yard field goal by Knight	0	31
4					Redskins	Grant 12-yard touchdown reception from Kilmer, Knight kick good	0	38
"TOP" = time of possession. For other American football terms, see Glossary of American football.							0	38

- Time of game:

Chargers	Game statistics	Redskins
10	First downs	13
36–128	Rushes–yards	39–83
75	Passing yards	128
7–20–4	Passes	10–18–0
8–68	Sacked–yards	1–2
7	Net passing yards	127
135	Total yards	211
82	Return yards	108
7–47.1	Punts	6–45.0
3–3	Fumbles–lost	3–2
7–59	Penalties–yards	7b65

=== Week 2 (Sunday, September 23, 1973): at St. Louis Cardinals ===
Week 2: Washington Redskins 27 at St. Louis Cardinals 34 – Game summary

Quarter	1	2	3	4	Total
Redskins (1–1)	0	7	3	17	27
Cardinals (2–0)	7	0	10	17	34

at Busch Memorial Stadium • St. Louis, Missouri

- Date: September 23, 1973
- Game time: 2:00 p.m. EDT
- Game weather: 72 °F (22 °C); relative humidity 86%; wind 6 miles per hour (9.7 km/h; 5.2 kn) (Mostly Cloudy)
- Game attendance: 50,316
- Referee: Chuck Heberling
- TV announcers (CBS): Dan Kelly (play-by-play), Irv Cross (color commentator) and Dick Stockton (studio reporter)

Team	Category	Player	Statistics
WAS	Passing	Billy Kilmer	14/22, 161 YDS, 1 TD
WAS	Rushing	Larry Brown	15 CAR, 49 YDS
WAS	Receiving	Charley Taylor	9 REC, 132 YDS, 1 TD
STL	Passing	Jim Hart	17/30, 286 YDS, 1 TD
STL	Rushing	Donny Anderson	14 CAR, 34 YDS, 2 TDs
STL	Receiving	Terry Metcalf	6 REC, 78 YDS

Scoring summary

Quarter	Time	Drive			Team	Scoring information	Score	
Quarter	Time	Plays	Yards	TOP	Team	Scoring information	WAS	STL
1					Cardinals	Anderson 1-yard touchdown run, Bakken kick good	0	7
2					Redskins	Taylor 23-yard touchdown reception from Kilmer, Knight kick good	7	7
3					Redskins	28-yard field goal by Knight	10	7
3					Cardinals	Anderson 1-yard touchdown run, Bakken kick good	10	14
3					Cardinals	23-yard field goal by Bakken	10	21
4					Cardinals	Anderson 12-yard touchdown reception from Hart, Bakken kick good	10	24
4					Redskins	Harraway 10-yard touchdown reception from Jurgensen, Knight kick good	17	24
4		—	—	—	Cardinals	Shy 97-yard kickoff return for a touchdown, Bakken kick good	17	31
4		—	—	—	Redskins	Mul-Key 97-yard kickoff return for a touchdown, Knight kick good	24	31
4					Cardinals	28-yard field goal by Bakken	24	34
4					Redskins	37-yard field goal by Knight	27	34
"TOP" = time of possession. For other American football terms, see Glossary of American football.							27	34

- Time of game:

Redskins	Game statistics	Cardinals
22	First downs	20
26–69	Rushes–yards	35–65
301	Passing yards	286
26–40–0	Passes	17–30–0
26–10	Sacked–yards	1–8
291	Net passing yards	278
360	Total yards	343
228	Return yards	196
3–36.7	Punts	6–34.5
2–1	Fumbles–lost	0–0
7–63	Penalties–yards	6–50

=== Week 3 (Sunday, September 30, 1973): at Philadelphia Eagles ===
Week 3: Washington Redskins 28 at Philadelphia Eagles 7 – Game summary

Quarter	1	2	3	4	Total
Redskins (2–1)	7	0	7	14	28
Eagles (0–2–1)	0	7	0	0	7

at Veterans Stadium • Philadelphia, Pennsylvania

- Date: September 30, 1973
- Game time: 1:00 p.m. EDT
- Game weather: 63 °F (17 °C); relative humidity 66%; wind 11 miles per hour (18 km/h; 9.6 kn) (Scattered Clouds)
- Game attendance: 64,147
- Referee: Bob Frederic
- TV announcers (CBS): Dan Kelly (play-by-play), Irv Cross (color commentator) and Andy Musser (studio reporter)

Team	Category	Player	Statistics
WAS	Passing	Sonny Jurgensen	16/29, 195 YDS, 2 TDs, 1 INT
WAS	Rushing	Larry Brown	30 CAR, 57 YDS, 1 TD
WAS	Receiving	Charley Taylor	7 REC, 69 YDS, 2 TDs
PHI	Passing	Roman Gabriel	19/38, 266 YDS, 1 TD, 2 INTs
PHI	Rushing	Tom Sullivan	13 CAR, 25 YDS
PHI	Receiving	Norm Bulaich	6 REC, 109 YDS, 1 TD

Scoring summary

Quarter	Time	Drive			Team	Scoring information	Score	
Quarter	Time	Plays	Yards	TOP	Team	Scoring information	WAS	PHI
1					Redskins	Taylor 23-yard touchdown reception from Jurgensen, Knight kick good	7	0
2					Eagles	Bulaich 80-yard touchdown reception from Gabriel, Dempsey kick good	7	7
3					Redskins	Taylor 10-yard touchdown reception from Jurgensen, Knight kick good	14	7
4					Redskins	Brown 8-yard touchdown run, Knight kick good	21	7
4			—	—	Redskins	Interception returned 34 yards for touchdown by Vactor, Knight kick good	28	7
"TOP" = time of possession. For other American football terms, see Glossary of American football.							28	7

- Time of game:

Redskins	Game statistics	Eagles
15	First downs	14
36–81	Rushes–yards	22–53
195	Passing yards	266
16–29–1	Passes	19–38–2
0–0	Sacked–yards	8–60
195	Net passing yards	206
276	Total yards	259
197	Return yards	85
8–38.3	Punts	9–44.0
3–0	Fumbles–lost	3–1
3–15	Penalties–yards	2–12

=== Week 4 (Monday, October 8, 1973): vs. Dallas Cowboys ===
Week 4: Dallas Cowboys 7 at Washington Redskins 14 – Game summary

Quarter	1	2	3	4	Total
Cowboys (3–1)	0	7	0	0	7
Redskins (3–1)	0	0	0	14	14

at RFK Stadium • Washington, D.C.

- Date: October 8, 1973
- Game time: 9:00 p.m. EDT
- Game weather: 67 °F (19 °C); relative humidity 64%; wind 5 miles per hour (8.0 km/h; 4.3 kn) (Overcast)
- Game attendance: 54,314
- Referee: Jim Tunney
- TV announcers (ABC): Frank Gifford (play-by-play), Howard Cosell (color commentator) and Don Meredith (color commentator)

Team	Category	Player	Statistics
DAL	Passing	Roger Staubach	9/17, 101 YDS, 1 TD
DAL	Rushing	Calvin Hill	21 CAR, 103 YDS
DAL	Receiving	Otto Stowe	4 REC, 54 YDS, 1 TD
WAS	Passing	Sonny Jurgensen	14/20, 140 YDS, 1 TD
WAS	Rushing	Larry Brown	18 CAR, 36 YDS
WAS	Receiving	Charley Taylor	4 REC, 29 YDS, 1 TD

Scoring summary

Quarter	Time	Drive			Team	Scoring information	Score	
Quarter	Time	Plays	Yards	TOP	Team	Scoring information	DAL	WAS
2					Cowboys	Stowe 15-yard touchdown reception from Staubach, Fritsch kick good	7	0
4					Redskins	Taylor 1-yard touchdown reception from Jurgensen, Knight kick good	7	7
4			—	—	Redskins	Interception returned 26 yards for touchdown by Owens, Knight kick good	7	14
"TOP" = time of possession. For other American football terms, see Glossary of American football.							7	14

- Time of game:

Cowboys	Game statistics	Redskins
20	First downs	13
39–182	Rushes–yards	28–71
132	Passing yards	140
13–32–1	Passes	14–20–1
7–45	Sacked–yards	5–37
87	Net passing yards	103
269	Total yards	174
99	Return yards	127
0–0.0	Punts	4–44.8
2–0	Fumbles–lost	2–1
6–52	Penalties–yards	6–30

=== Week 5 (Sunday, October 14, 1973): at New York Giants ===
Week 5: Washington Redskins 21 at New York Giants 3 – Game summary

Quarter	1	2	3	4	Total
Redskins (4–1)	7	0	7	7	21
Giants (1–3–1)	3	0	0	0	3

at Yale Bowl • New Haven, Connecticut

- Date: October 14, 1973
- Game time: 1:00 p.m. EDT
- Game weather: 67 °F (19 °C); relative humidity 46%; wind 17 miles per hour (27 km/h; 15 kn) (Clear)
- Game attendance: 70,168
- Referee: Fred Silva
- TV announcers (CBS): Jack Whitaker (play-by-play), Wayne Walker (color commentator) and Dick Stockton (studio reporter)

Team	Category	Player	Statistics
WAS	Passing	Sonny Jurgensen	8/13, 52 YDS, 3 INTs
WAS	Rushing	Larry Brown	17 CAR, 65 YDS, 2 TDs
WAS	Receiving	Charley Taylor	5 REC, 48 YDS
NYG	Passing	Norm Snead	19/32, 151 YDS, 4 INTs
NYG	Rushing	Ron Johnson	25 CAR, 75 YDS
NYG	Receiving	Don Herrmann	5 REC, 73 YDS

Scoring summary

Quarter	Time	Drive			Team	Scoring information	Score	
Quarter	Time	Plays	Yards	TOP	Team	Scoring information	WAS	NYG
1					Giants	24-yard field goal by Gogolak	0	3
1					Redskins	Brown 1-yard touchdown run, Knight kick good	7	3
3					Redskins	Brown 4-yard touchdown run, Knight kick good	14	3
4			—	—	Redskins	Interception returned 28 yards for touchdown by Robinson, Knight kick good	21	3
"TOP" = time of possession. For other American football terms, see Glossary of American football.							21	3

- Time of game:

Redskins	Game statistics	Giants
12	First downs	12
36–116	Rushes–yards	33–92
52	Passing yards	151
8–13–3	Passes	19–32–4
3–20	Sacked–yards	2–13
32	Net passing yards	138
148	Total yards	230
128	Return yards	149
5–39.2	Punts	6–27.8
1–0	Fumbles–lost	3–2
3–22	Penalties–yards	8–49

=== Week 6 (Sunday, October 21, 1973): vs. St. Louis Cardinals ===
Week 6: St. Louis Cardinals 13 at Washington Redskins 31 – Game summary

Quarter	1	2	3	4	Total
Cardinals (2–4)	0	6	7	0	13
Redskins (5–1)	7	14	0	10	31

at RFK Stadium • Washington, D.C.

- Date: October 21, 1973
- Game time: 1:00 p.m. EDT
- Game weather: 58 °F (14 °C); relative humidity 57%; wind 8 miles per hour (13 km/h; 7.0 kn) (Scattered Clouds)
- Game attendance: 54,381
- Referee: Bernie Ulman
- TV announcers (CBS): Lindsey Nelson (play-by-play), Tom Brookshier (color commentator) and Andy Musser (studio reporter)

Team	Category	Player	Statistics
STL	Passing	Jim Hart	15/39, 239 YDS, 1 TD, 3 INTs
STL	Rushing	Jim Otis	8 CAR, 23 YDS
STL	Receiving	Jackie Smith	5 REC, 49 YDS
WAS	Passing	Billy Kilmer	20/33, 294 YDS, 2 TDs, 3 INTs
WAS	Rushing	Larry Brown	27 CAR, 89 YDS
WAS	Receiving	Charley Taylor	7 REC, 153 YDS, 1 TD

Scoring summary

Quarter	Time	Drive			Team	Scoring information	Score	
Quarter	Time	Plays	Yards	TOP	Team	Scoring information	STL	WAS
1					Redskins	Harraway 1-yard touchdown run, Knight kick good	0	7
2					Cardinals	32-yard field goal by Bakken	3	7
2					Redskins	Taylor 22-yard touchdown reception from Kilmer, Knight kick good	3	14
2					Redskins	Hancock 1-yard touchdown reception from Kilmer, Knight kick good	3	21
2					Cardinals	31-yard field goal by Bakken	6	21
3					Cardinals	Gray 69-yard touchdown reception from Hart, Bakken kick good	13	21
4					Redskins	18-yard field goal by Knight	13	24
4					Redskins	Interception returned 68 yards for touchdown by Bass, Knight kick good	13	31
"TOP" = time of possession. For other American football terms, see Glossary of American football.							13	31

- Time of game:

Cardinals	Game statistics	Redskins
12	First downs	23
17–46	Rushes–yards	47–142
239	Passing yards	294
15–39–3	Passes	20–33–3
5–37	Sacked–yards	1–8
202	Net passing yards	286
248	Total yards	428
130	Return yards	155
11–40.6	Punts	6–46.7
3–2	Fumbles–lost	4–4
8–84	Penalties–yards	8–120

=== Week 7 (Sunday, October 28, 1973): at New Orleans Saints ===
Week 7: Washington Redskins 3 at New Orleans Saints 19 – Game summary

Quarter	1	2	3	4	Total
Redskins (5–2)	0	0	0	3	3
Saints (3–4)	10	6	0	3	19

at Tulane Stadium • New Orleans, Louisiana

- Date: October 28, 1973
- Game time: 2:00 p.m. EST
- Game weather: 68 °F (20 °C); relative humidity 74%; wind 9 miles per hour (14 km/h; 7.8 kn) (Scattered Clouds)
- Game attendance: 66,315
- Referee: Dick Jorgensen
- TV announcers (CBS): Lindsey Nelson (play-by-play), John Sauer (color commentator) and Andy Musser (studio reporter)

Team	Category	Player	Statistics
WAS	Passing	Sonny Jurgensen	13/25, 110 YDS, 1 INT
WAS	Rushing	Charley Harraway	6 CAR, 18 YDS
WAS	Receiving	Larry Brown	6 REC, 54 YDS
NO	Passing	Archie Manning	7/17, 62 YDS, 1 TD
NO	Rushing	Jess Phillips	23 CAR, 85 YDS
NO	Receiving	Joe Profit	2 REC, 31 YDS

Scoring summary

Quarter	Time	Drive			Team	Scoring information	Score	
Quarter	Time	Plays	Yards	TOP	Team	Scoring information	WAS	NO
1					Saints	35-yard field goal by McClard	0	3
1					Saints	Butler 9-yard touchdown reception from Manning, McClard kick good	0	10
2					Saints	43-yard field goal by McClard	0	13
2					Saints	30-yard field goal by McClard	0	16
4					Redskins	35-yard field goal by Knight	3	16
4					Saints	37-yard field goal by McClard	3	19
"TOP" = time of possession. For other American football terms, see Glossary of American football.							3	19

- Time of game:

Redskins	Game statistics	Saints
15	First downs	19
18–24	Rushes–yards	52–203
186	Passing yards	62
19–37–2	Passes	7–17–0
5–31	Sacked–yards	4–23
155	Net passing yards	39
179	Total yards	242
104	Return yards	84
7–40.0	Punts	3–41.7
0–0	Fumbles–lost	0–0
7–106	Penalties–yards	4–40

=== Week 8 (Monday, November 5, 1973): at Pittsburgh Steelers ===
Week 8: Washington Redskins 16 at Pittsburgh Steelers 21 – Game summary

Quarter	1	2	3	4	Total
Redskins (5–3)	3	3	3	7	16
Steelers (7–1)	7	7	0	7	21

at Three Rivers Stadium • Pittsburgh, Pennsylvania

- Date: November 5, 1973
- Game time: 9:00 p.m. EST
- Game weather: 40 °F (4 °C); relative humidity 62%; wind 13 miles per hour (21 km/h; 11 kn) (Scattered Clouds)
- Game attendance: 49,220
- Referee: Tom Bell
- TV announcers (ABC): Frank Gifford (play-by-play), Howard Cosell (color commentator) and Don Meredith (color commentator)

Team	Category	Player	Statistics
WAS	Passing	Billy Kilmer	9/22, 76 YDS, 1 TD, 2 INTs
WAS	Rushing	Charley Harraway	13 CAR, 63 YDS
WAS	Receiving	Jerry Smith	4 REC, 34 YDS
PIT	Passing	Joe Gilliam	3/10, 71 YDS, 1 TD, 2 INTs
PIT	Rushing	Franco Harris	25 CAR, 90 YDS
PIT	Receiving	Barry Pearson	2 REC, 57 YDS, 1 TD

Scoring summary

Quarter	Time	Drive			Team	Scoring information	Score	
Quarter	Time	Plays	Yards	TOP	Team	Scoring information	WAS	PIT
1					Redskins	30-yard field goal by Knight	3	0
1					Steelers	Pearson 7-yard touchdown reception from Hanratty, Gerela kick good	3	7
2					Redskins	12-yard field goal by Knight	6	7
2					Steelers	Shanklin 24-yard touchdown reception from Hanratty, Gerela kick good	6	14
3					Redskins	16-yard field goal by Knight	9	14
4					Steelers	Pearson 46-yard touchdown reception from Gilliam, Gerela kick good	9	21
4					Redskins	Taylor 17-yard touchdown reception from Kilmer, Knight kick good	16	21
"TOP" = time of possession. For other American football terms, see Glossary of American football.							16	21

- Time of game:

Redskins	Game statistics	Steelers
14	First downs	18
33–117	Rushes–yards	49–153
76	Passing yards	125
9–22–2	Passes	8–19–4
1–3	Sacked–yards	2–23
73	Net passing yards	102
188	Total yards	255
167	Return yards	79
3–37.7	Punts	4–33.8
2–2	Fumbles–lost	6–0
6–50	Penalties–yards	7–66

=== Week 9 (Sunday, November 11, 1973): vs. San Francisco 49ers ===
Week 9: San Francisco 49ers 9 at Washington Redskins 33 – Game summary

Quarter	1	2	3	4	Total
49ers (3–6)	0	9	0	0	9
Redskins (6–3)	7	3	13	10	33

at RFK Stadium • Washington, D.C.

- Date: November 11, 1973
- Game time: 1:00 p.m. EST
- Game weather: 38 °F (3 °C); relative humidity 50%; wind 8 miles per hour (13 km/h; 7.0 kn) (Cloudy)
- Game attendance: 54,381
- Referee: Fred Swearingen
- TV announcers (CBS): Jack Buck (play-by-play), Pat Summerall (color commentator) and Brent Musburger (studio reporter)

Team	Category	Player	Statistics
SF	Passing	Joe Reed	20/36, 233 YDS, 2 INTs
SF	Rushing	Jimmy Thomas	11 CAR, 47 YDS
SF	Receiving	Danny Abramowicz	6 REC, 76 YDS
WAS	Passing	Billy Kilmer	22/39, 267 YDS, 2 TDs
WAS	Rushing	Larry Brown	19 CAR, 72 YDS
WAS	Receiving	Charley Taylor	7 REC, 72 YDS

Scoring summary

Quarter	Time	Drive			Team	Scoring information	Score	
Quarter	Time	Plays	Yards	TOP	Team	Scoring information	SF	WAS
1					Redskins	Jurgensen 18-yard touchdown reception from Kilmer, Knight kick good	0	7
2					49ers	9-yard field goal by Gossett	3	7
2					49ers	27-yard field goal by Gossett	6	7
2					Redskins	42-yard field goal by Knight	6	10
2					49ers	38-yard field goal by Gossett	9	10
3					Redskins	Harraway 25-yard touchdown reception from Kilmer, Knight kick good	9	17
3					Redskins	32-yard field goal by Knight	9	20
3					Redskins	24-yard field goal by Knight	9	23
4					Redskins	41-yard field goal by Knight	9	26
4					Redskins	Hancock 2-yard touchdown reception from Kilmer, Knight kick good	9	33
"TOP" = time of possession. For other American football terms, see Glossary of American football.							9	33

- Time of game:

49ers	Game statistics	Redskins
22	First downs	22
29–123	Rushes–yards	28–86
233	Passing yards	285
20–36–2	Passes	23–40–0
7–34	Sacked–yards	3–28
199	Net passing yards	257
322	Total yards	343
134	Return yards	148
4–38.8	Punts	3–40.3
4–3	Fumbles–lost	2–2
9–72	Penalties–yards	10–90

=== Week 10 (Sunday, November 18, 1973): vs. Baltimore Colts ===
Week 10: Baltimore Colts 14 at Washington Redskins 22 – Game summary

Quarter	1	2	3	4	Total
Colts (2–8)	0	0	7	7	14
Redskins (7–3)	7	6	3	6	22

at RFK Stadium • Washington, D.C.

- Date: November 2, 1973
- Game time: 1:00 p.m. EST
- Game weather: 41 °F (5 °C); relative humidity 55%; wind 7 miles per hour (11 km/h; 6.1 kn) (Overcast)
- Game attendance: 53,675
- Referee: Norm Schachter
- TV announcers (NBC): Jay Randolph (play-by-play) and Paul Maguire (color commentator)

Team	Category	Player	Statistics
BAL	Passing	Marty Domres	14/30, 137 YDS, 1 TD, 2 INTs
BAL	Rushing	Lydell Mitchell	17 CAR, 54 YDS
BAL	Receiving	Tom Mitchell	4 REC, 48 YDS
WAS	Passing	Billy Kilmer	10/20, 152 YDS, 1 INT
WAS	Rushing	Larry Brown	22 CAR, 78 YDS, 1 TD
WAS	Receiving	Roy Jefferson	3 REC, 63 YDS

Scoring summary

Quarter	Time	Drive			Team	Scoring information	Score	
Quarter	Time	Plays	Yards	TOP	Team	Scoring information	BAL	WAS
1					Redskins	Brown 1-yard touchdown run, Knight kick good	0	7
2					Redskins	35-yard field goal by Knight	0	10
2					Redskins	18-yard field goal by Knight	0	13
3					Colts	McCauley 1-yard touchdown run, Hunt kick good	7	13
3					Redskins	37-yard field goal by Knight	7	16
4					Redskins	42-yard field goal by Knight	7	19
4					Colts	Speyrer 4-yard touchdown reception from Domres, Hunt kick good	14	19
4					Redskins	29-yard field goal by Knight	14	22
"TOP" = time of possession. For other American football terms, see Glossary of American football.							14	22

- Time of game:

Colts	Game statistics	Redskins
22	First downs	14
35–120	Rushes–yards	32–104
137	Passing yards	152
14–30–2	Passes	10–20–1
2–15	Sacked–yards	2–12
122	Net passing yards	140
242	Total yards	244
146	Return yards	129
4–40.0	Punts	3–33.7
3–2	Fumbles–lost	2–0
6–64	Penalties–yards	9–80

=== Week 11 (Thursday, November 22, 1973): at Detroit Lions ===
Week 11: Washington Redskins 20 at Detroit Lions 0 – Game summary

Quarter	1	2	3	4	Total
Redskins (8–3)	10	3	7	0	20
Lions (4–6–1)	0	0	0	0	0

at Tiger Stadium • Detroit, Michigan

- Date: November 22, 1973
- Game time: 12:15 p.m. EST
- Game weather: 45 °F (7 °C); relative humidity 81%; wind 16 miles per hour (26 km/h; 14 kn) (Partly Cloudy)
- Game attendance: 46,807
- Referee: Pat Haggerty
- TV announcers (CBS): Ray Scott (play-by-play), Pat Summerall (color commentator) and Bruce Roberts (studio reporter)

Team	Category	Player	Statistics
WAS	Passing	Billy Kilmer	12/2, 122 YDS, 2 TDs
WAS	Rushing	Charley Harraway	18 CAR, 107 YDS
WAS	Receiving	Charley Taylor	5 REC, 34 YDS, 1 TD
DET	Passing	Bill Munson	13/26, 141 YDS 1 INT
DET	Rushing	Altie Taylor	13 CAR, 30 YDS
DET	Receiving	Altie Taylor	5 REC, 61 YDS

Scoring summary

Quarter	Time	Drive			Team	Scoring information	Score	
Quarter	Time	Plays	Yards	TOP	Team	Scoring information	WAS	DET
1					Redskins	Harraway 4-yard touchdown reception from Kilmer, Knight kick good	7	0
1					Redskins	25-yard field goal by Knight	10	0
2					Redskins	23-yard field goal by Knight	13	0
3					Redskins	Taylor 3-yard touchdown reception from Kilmer, Knight kick good	20	0
"TOP" = time of possession. For other American football terms, see Glossary of American football.							20	0

- Time of game:

Redskins	Game statistics	Lions
20	First downs	11
45–202	Rushes–yards	23–74
112	Passing yards	141
12–22–0	Passes	13–26–1
3–16	Sacked–yards	2–7
96	Net passing yards	134
298	Total yards	208
38	Return yards	81
4–38.0	Punts	7–34.4
0–0	Fumbles–lost	3–2
4–30	Penalties–yards	5–55

=== Week 12 (Sunday, December 2, 1973): vs. New York Giants ===
Week 12: New York Giants 24 at Washington Redskins 38 – Game summary

Quarter	1	2	3	4	Total
Giants (2–9–1)	7	14	0	3	24
Redskins (9–3)	3	10	0	14	27

at RFK Stadium • Washington, D.C.

- Date: December 2, 1973
- Game time: 1:00 p.m. EST
- Game weather: 41 °F (5 °C); relative humidity 52%; wind 8 miles per hour (13 km/h; 7.0 kn) (Scattered Clouds)
- Game attendance: 53,590
- Referee: Jim Tunney
- TV announcers (CBS): Jack Whitaker (play-by-play), Wayne Walker (color commentator) and Andy Musser (studio reporter)

Team	Category	Player	Statistics
NYG	Passing	Randy Johnson	13/23, 159 YDS, 2 TDs
NYG	Rushing	Ron Johnson	26 CAR, 90 YDS, 1 TD
NYG	Receiving	Ron Johnson	6 REC, 101 YDS, 1 TD
WAS	Passing	Sonny Jurgensen	12/15, 135 YDS, 1 TD
WAS	Rushing	Larry Brown	18 CAR, 71 YDS, 2 TDs
WAS	Receiving	Roy Jefferson	5 REC, 67 YDS

Scoring summary

Quarter	Time	Drive			Team	Scoring information	Score	
Quarter	Time	Plays	Yards	TOP	Team	Scoring information	NYG	WAS
1					Redskins	12-yard field goal by Knight	0	3
1					Giants	Johnson 3-yard touchdown run, Gogolak kick good	7	3
2					Giants	Tucker 12-yard touchdown reception from Johnson, Gogolak kick good	14	3
2					Giants	Johnson 25-yard touchdown reception from Johnson, Gogolak kick good	21	3
2					Redskins	Brown 3-yard touchdown run, Knight kick good	21	10
2					Redskins	13-yard field goal by Knight	21	13
4					Giants	22-yard field goal by Knight	24	13
4					Redskins	Brown 6-yard touchdown run, Knight kick good	24	20
4					Redskins	Brown 16-yard touchdown reception from Jurgensen, Knight kick good	24	27
"TOP" = time of possession. For other American football terms, see Glossary of American football.							24	27

- Time of game:

Giants	Game statistics	Redskins
13	First downs	18
37–120	Rushes–yards	31–99
159	Passing yards	273
13–23–0	Passes	18–30–1
2–13	Sacked–yards	2–13
146	Net passing yards	260
266	Total yards	359
106	Return yards	128
8–43.4	Punts	4–44.0
1–1	Fumbles–lost	3–2
8–50	Penalties–yards	3–30

=== Week 13 (Sunday, December 9, 1973): at Dallas Cowboys ===
Week 13: Washington Redskins 7 at Dallas Cowboys 24 – Game summary

Quarter	1	2	3	4	Total
Redskins (9–4)	0	0	0	7	7
Cowboys (9–4)	0	3	14	10	27

at Texas Stadium • Irving, Texas

- Date: December 9, 1973
- Game time: 4:00 p.m. EST
- Game weather: 48 °F (9 °C); relative humidity 58%; wind 11 miles per hour (18 km/h; 9.6 kn) (Clear)
- Game attendance: 62,195
- Referee: Fred Silva
- TV announcers (CBS): Frank Glieber (play-by-play), Pat Summerall (color commentator) and Frank Clarke (studio reporter)

Team	Category	Player	Statistics
WAS	Passing	Sonny Jurgensen	11/24, 114 YDS
WAS	Rushing	Charley Harraway	8 CAR, 30 YDS
WAS	Receiving	Charley Taylor	3 REC, 48 YDS
DAL	Passing	Roger Staubach	16/25, 223 YDS, 2 INTs
DAL	Rushing	Calvin Hill	27 CAR, 110 YDS. 2 TDs
DAL	Receiving	Walt Garrison	4 REC, 45 YDS

Scoring summary

Quarter	Time	Drive			Team	Scoring information	Score	
Quarter	Time	Plays	Yards	TOP	Team	Scoring information	WAS	DAL
2					Cowboys	9-yard field goal by Fritsch	0	3
3					Cowboys	Staubach 5-yard touchdown run, Fritsch kick good	0	10
3					Cowboys	Hill 1-yard touchdown run, Fritsch kick good	0	17
4					Cowboys	Hill 2-yard touchdown run, Fritsch kick good	0	24
4					Cowboys	27-yard field goal by Fritsch	0	27
4		—	—	—	Redskins	Stone recovered blocked punt and returned 12 yards for a touchdown, Knight kick good	7	27
"TOP" = time of possession. For other American football terms, see Glossary of American football.							7	27

- Time of game:

Redskins	Game statistics	Cowboys
9	First downs	22
22–59	Rushes–yards	47–193
114	Passing yards	223
11–24–0	Passes	16–25–2
3–18	Sacked–yards	2–2
96	Net passing yards	221
155	Total yards	414
176	Return yards	25
6–37.3	Punts	0–0.0
5–3	Fumbles–lost	2–1
2–20	Penalties–yards	8–45

=== Week 14 (Sunday, December 16, 1973): vs. Philadelphia Eagles ===
Week 14: Philadelphia Eagles 20 at Washington Redskins 38 – Game summary

Quarter	1	2	3	4	Total
Eagles (5–8–1)	10	3	7	0	20
Redskins (10–4)	0	24	7	7	38

at RFK Stadium • Washington, D.C.

- Date: December 16, 1973
- Game time: 1:00 p.m. EST
- Game weather: 36 °F (2 °C); relative humidity 69%; wind 11 miles per hour (18 km/h; 9.6 kn); wind chill 27 °F (−3 °C) (Flurries)
- Game attendance: 49,484
- Referee: Fred Swearingen
- TV announcers (CBS): Jack Whitaker (play-by-play), Wayne Walker (color commentator) and Brent Musburger (studio reporter)

Team	Category	Player	Statistics
PHI	Passing	Roman Gabriel	22/39, 302 YDS, 1 TD, 1 INT
PHI	Rushing	Tom Sullivan	15 CAR, 41 YDS
PHI	Receiving	Harold Carmichael	4 REC, 111 YDS
WAS	Passing	Billy Kilmer	13/24, 251 YDS, 4 TDs, 1 INT
WAS	Rushing	Larry Brown	26 CAR, 150 YDS, 1 TD
WAS	Receiving	Larry Brown	3 REC, 105 YDS, 3 TDs

Scoring summary

Quarter	Time	Drive			Team	Scoring information	Score	
Quarter	Time	Plays	Yards	TOP	Team	Scoring information	PHI	WAS
1					Eagles	44-yard field goal by Dempsey	3	0
1					Eagles	Young 34-yard touchdown reception from Gabriel, Dempsey kick good	10	0
2					Redskins	Brown 14-yard touchdown reception from Kilmer, Knight kick good	10	7
2					Redskins	15-yard field goal by Knight	10	10
2					Redskins	Jefferson 32-yard touchdown reception from Kilmer, Knight kick good	10	17
2					Redskins	Brown 27-yard touchdown reception from Kilmer, Knight kick good	10	24
2					Eagles	15-yard field goal by Dempsey	13	24
3					Redskins	Brown 64-yard touchdown reception from Kilmer, Knight kick good	13	31
3					Eagles	Sullivan 1-yard touchdown run, Dempsey kick good	20	31
4					Redskins	Brown 8-yard touchdown run, Knight kick good	20	38
"TOP" = time of possession. For other American football terms, see Glossary of American football.							20	38

- Time of game:

Eagles	Game statistics	Redskins
18	First downs	22
26–51	Rushes–yards	38–186
302	Passing yards	251
22–39–1	Passes	13–24–1
1–7	Sacked–yards	1–5
295	Net passing yards	246
346	Total yards	432
144	Return yards	181
3–33.3	Punts	2–36.5
2–1	Fumbles–lost	3–1
2–10	Penalties–yards	6–50

== Stats ==
Passing

Passing
Player	Pos	G	GS	QBrec	Cmp	Att	Cmp%	Yds	TD	TD%	Int	Int%	Y/A	AY/A	Y/C	Y/G	Lng	Rate	Sk	Yds	NY/A	ANY/A	Sk%	4QC	GWD
Kilmer	QB	10	10	7–3–0	122	227	53.7	1656	14	6.2	9	4.0	63	7.3	6.7	13.6	165.6	81.3	15	88	6.2	6.48	5.96		
Jurgensen	QB	14	4	3–1–0	87	145	60.0	904	6	4.1	5	3.4	36	6.2	5.5	10.4	64.6	77.5	16	114	9.9	4.91	4.25	2	1
Team Total		14		10–4–0	209	372	56.2	2560	20	5.4	14	3.8	63	6.9	6.3	12.2	182.9	79.8	31	202	7.7	5.85	5.28	2	1
Opp Total		14			203	406	50.0	2531	12	3.0	26	6.4		6.2	3.94	12.5	180.8	52.9	53	355	11.5	4.7	2.7		

Rushing

Rushing
Player	Pos	G	GS	Att	Yds	TD	Lng	Y/A	Y/G	A/G
Brown	RB	14	14	273	860	8	27	3.2	61.4	19.5
Harraway	FB	14	14	128	452	1	16	3.5	32.3	9.1
Thomas	RB	13	0	32	95	0	13	3.0	7.3	2.5
Mul-Key	RB	14	0	8	20	0	7	2.5	1.4	0.6
Kilmer	QB	10	10	9	10	0	5	1.1	1.0	0.9
Jurgensen	QB	14	4	3	7	0	7	2.3	0.5	0.2
Brunet	RB	14	0	2	4	0	3	2.0	0.3	0.1
Jefferson	WR	14	14	1	1	0	1	1.0	0.1	0.1
Hull	RB	13	0	2	–3	0	–1	–1.5	–0.2	0.2
Taylor	WR	14	14	1	–7	0	–7	–7.0	–0.5	0.1
Team Total		14		459	1439	9	27	3.1	102.8	32.8
Opp Total		14		480	1603	8		3.3	114.5	34.3

Receiving

Receiving
Player	Pos	G	GS	Rec	Yds	Y/R	TD	Lng	R/G	Y/G	Ctch%
Taylor	WR	14	14	59	801	13.6	7	53	4.2	57.2	0.0%
Jefferson	WR	14	14	41	595	14.5	1	36	2.9	42.5	0.0%
Brown	RB	14	14	40	482	12.1	6	64	2.9	34.4	0.0%
Harraway	FB	14	14	32	291	9.1	3	31	2.3	20.8	0.0%
Smith	TE	13	9	19	215	11.3	0	25	1.5	16.5	0.0%
Reed	TE	5	5	9	124	13.8	0	34	1.8	24.8	0.0%
Thomas	RB	13	0	5	40	8.0	0	13	0.4	3.1	0.0%
Hancock	TE	10	0	2	3	1.5	2	2	0.2	0.3	0.0%
Grant	WR	13	0	1	12	12.0	1	12	0.1	0.9	0.0%
Jurgensen	QB	14	4	1	–3	–3.0	0	–3	0.1	–0.2	0.0%
Team Total		14		209	2560	12.2	20	64	14.9	182.9	
Opp Total		14		203	2176	10.7	12		14.5	155.4	

Kicking

Kicking
		Games		0–19		20–29		30–39		40–49		50+		Scoring						
Player	Pos	G	GS	FGA	FGM	FGA	FGM	FGA	FGM	FGA	FGM	FGA	FGM	FGA	FGM	Lng	FG%	XPA	XPM	XP%
Knight	K	14	0	8	8	7	5	13	6	9	3	5		42	22	42	52.4%	37	37	100.0%
Team Total		14		8	8	7	5	13	6	9	3	5		42	22		52.4%	37	37	100.0%
Opp Total		14												29	17		58.6%	21	21	100.0%

Punting

Punting
Player	Pos	G	GS	Pnt	Yds	Lng	Blck	Y/P
Bragg	P	14	0	64	2581	61	0	40.3
Team Total		14		64	2581	61	0	40.3
Opp Total		14		81	3110			38.4

Kick Return

Kick return
Player	Pos	G	GS	Rt	Yds	TD	Lng	Y/Rt
Mul-Key	RB	14	0	36	1011	1	97	28.1
Duncan	DB	14	0	4	65	0	38	16.3
Tillman	LB	14	0	3	42	0	18	14.0
Team Total		14		43	1118	1	97	26.0
Opp Total		14		62	1237	1		20.0

Punt Return

Punt return
Player	Pos	G	GS	Ret	Yds	TD	Lng	Y/R
Duncan	DB	14	0	28	228	0	18	8.1
Mul-Key	RB	14	0	11	103	0	27	9.4
Smith	TE	13	9	1	0	0	0	0.0
Team Total		14		40	331	0	27	8.3
Opp Total		14		14	104	0		7.4

Sacks

Sacks
Player	Pos	G	GS	Sk
Biggs	RDE	14	14	15.0
Brundige	LDT	14	13	13.0
Talbert	RDT	14	14	7.5
McDole	LDE	14	14	6.5
Robinson	LLB	14	14	5.0
Hanburger	RLB	14	14	3.0
Holman	DE	5	0	1.0
Jones	DE	6	0	1.0
Sistrunk	DT	12	2	1.0
Team Total		14		53
Opp Total		14		31

Interceptions

Interceptions
Player	Pos	G	GS	Int	Yds	TD	Lng	PD
Houston	SS	14	14	6	32	0	32	
Bass	RCB	14	14	5	161	1	68	
Owens	FS	14	14	5	123	1	27	
Robinson	LLB	14	14	4	98	1	39	
Fischer	LCB	14	14	3	99	0	67	
Hanburger	RLB	14	14	1	45	0	45	
Vactor	DB	9	0	1	34	1	34	
Duncan	DB	24	0	1	6	0	6	
Team Total		14		26	598	4	68	
Opp Total		14						

Fumbles

Fumbles
Player	Pos	G	GS	FF	Fmb	FR	Yds	TD
Brown	RB	14	14		7	2	0	0
Kilmer	QB	10	10		6	2	–18	0
Harraway	FB	14	14		6	1	0	0
Mul-Key	RB	14	0		4	2	0	0
Duncan	DB	14	0		3	1	0	0
Ryczek	LS	14	0		1	1	–4	0
Jurgensen	QB	14	4		1	0	0	0
Smith	TE	13	9		1	0	0	0
Taylor	WR	14	14		1	0	0	0
Thomas	RB	13	0		1	0	0	0
Tillman	LB	14	0		1	0	0	0
Houston	SS	14		0	5	8	0	
Biggs	RDE	14	14		0	3	2	1
Owens	FS	14	14		0	2	56	1
Robinson	LLB	14	14		0	2	0	0
Hanburger	RLB	14	14		0	1	9	0
Bragg	P	14	0		0	1	0	0
Brundige	LDT	14	12		0	1	0	0
Fischer	LCB	14	14		0	1	0	0
Hull	RB	13	0		0	1	0	0
Jefferson	WR	14	14		0	1	0	0
Malinchak	WR	14	0		0	1	0	0
Starke	RT	14	7		0	1	0	0
Stone	DB	4	0		0	1	0	0
Team Total		14			32	30	53	2
Opp Total		14			35	17		0

Tackles

Tackles
Player	Pos	G	GS	Comb	Solo	Ast	TFL	QBHits	Sfty
Team Total		14							
Opp Total		14							

Scoring Summary

Scoring Summary
Player	Pos	G	GS	RshTD	RecTD	PR TD	KR TD	FblTD	IntTD	OthTD	AllTD	XPM	XPA	FGM	FGA	Sfty	Pts	Pts/G
Knight	K	14	0									37	37	22	42		103	7.4
Brown	RB	14	14	8	6						14						84	6.0
Taylor	WR	14	14		7						7						42	3.0
Harraway	FB	14	14	1	3						4						24	1.7
Hancock	TE	10	0		2						2						12	1.2
Owens	FS	14	14					1	1		2						12	0.9
Bass	RCB	14	14						1		1						6	0.4
Biggs	RDE	14	14					1			1						6	0.4
Grant	WR	13	0		1						1						6	0.5
Jefferson	WR	14	14		1						1						6	0.4
Mul-Key	RB	14	0				1				1						6	0.4
Robinson	LLB	14	14						1		1						6	0.4
Stone	DB	4	0							1	1						6	1.5
Vactor	DB	9	0						1		1						6	0.7
Team Total		14		9	20		1	2	4	1	37	37	37	22	42		325	
Opp Total		14		8	12		1				21	21	21	17	29		198	

Team

Team
			Total Yds & TO					Passing							Rushing					Penalties		
Player	PF	Yds	Ply	Y/P	TO	FL	1stD	Cmp	Att	Yds	TD	Int	NY/A	1stD	Att	Yds	TD	Y/A	1stD	Pen	Yds	1stPy
Team Stats	325	3797	862	4.4	32	18	232	209	372	2358	20	14	5.9	131	459	1439	9	3.1	76	81	771	25
Opp Stats	198	3779	939	4.0	44	18	233	203	406	2176	12	26	4.7	119	480	1603	8	3.3	89	86	708	25
Lg Rank Offense	6	18			12	20	14		9	6	5	8	7		18	25	20	26				
Lg Rank Defense	6	9			2	6	15		25	18	9	2	8		8	4	6	1				

Quarter-by-quarter

Quarter-by-quarter
Team	1	2	3	4	T
Redskins	72	70	57	126	325
Opponent	44	62	45	47	198

== Playoffs ==
Round	Date	Opponent	Result	Venue	Attendance	Recap
Divisional	December 22	at Minnesota Vikings	L 20–27	Metropolitan Stadium	45,475	Recap

=== NFC Divisional Playoffs (Saturday, December 22, 1973): at Minnesota Vikings ===
NFC Divisional Playoffs: Washington Redskins 20 at Minnesota Vikings 27 – Game summary

Quarter	1	2	3	4	Total
Redskins (10–5)	0	7	3	10	20
Vikings (13–2)	0	3	7	17	27

at Metropolitan Stadium • Bloomington, Minnesota

- Date: December 22, 1973
- Game time: 1:00 p.m. EST
- Game weather: 19 °F (−7 °C); relative humidity 71%; wind 11 miles per hour (18 km/h; 9.6 kn); wind chill 7 °F (−14 °C) (Overcast)
- Game attendance: 45,475
- Referee: Jim Tunney
- TV announcers (CBS): Jack Whitaker (play-by-play), Tommy Mason (color commentator), Wayne Walker (color commentator) and Bruce Roberts (studio reporter)

Team	Category	Player	Statistics
WAS	Passing	Billy Kilmer	13/24, 159 YDS, 1 TD, 1 INT
WAS	Rushing	Larry Brown	29 CAR, 115 YDS, 1 TD
WAS	Receiving	Roy Jefferson	6 REC, 84 YDS, 1 TD
MIN	Passing	Fran Tarkenton	16/28, 222 YDS, 2 TDs, 1 INT
MIN	Rushing	Oscar Reed	17 CAR, 95 YDS
MIN	Receiving	Oscar Reed	5 REC, 76 YDS

Scoring summary

Quarter	Time	Drive			Team	Scoring information	Score	
Quarter	Time	Plays	Yards	TOP	Team	Scoring information	WAS	MIN
2					Vikings	19-yard field goal by Cox	0	3
2					Redskins	Brown 3-yard touchdown run, Knight kick good	7	3
3					Vikings	Brown 2-yard touchdown run, Cox kick good	7	10
3					Redskins	52-yard field goal by Knight	10	10
4					Redskins	42-yard field goal by Knight	13	10
4					Vikings	Gilliam 28-yard touchdown reception from Tarkenton, Cox kick good	13	17
4					Vikings	Gilliam 6-yard touchdown reception from Tarkenton, Cox kick good	13	24
4					Redskins	Jefferson 28-yard touchdown reception from Kilmer, Knight kick good	20	24
4					Vikings	30-yard field goal by Cox	20	27
"TOP" = time of possession. For other American football terms, see Glossary of American football.							20	27

- Point spread: Redskins +8
- Time of game:

Redskins	Game statistics	Vikings
18	First downs	17
42–155	Rushes–yards	34–141
159	Passing yards	222
13–24–1	Passes	16–28–1
0–0	Sacked–yards	1–4
159	Net passing yards	218
314	Total yards	359
150	Return yards	156
4–37.3	Punts	6–31.8
2–1	Fumbles–lost	2–1
0–0	Penalties–yards	2–9
