= 1975 Washington Redskins season =

NFL team season

- Owner: Edward Bennett Williams
- General manager: George Allen
- President: Edward Bennett Williams
- Head coach: George Allen
- Offensive coordinator: Charlie Waller
- Defensive coordinator: LaVern Torgeson
- Home stadium: RFK Stadium

Results
- Record: 8–6
- Division place: 3rd NFC East
- Playoffs: Did not qualify

The 1975 Washington Redskins season was the franchise's 44th season in the National Football League (NFL) and their 39th in Washington, D.C. The team failed to improve on their 10–4 record from 1974 and finished 8–6, and missed the playoffs for the first time since 1970.

== Offseason ==
=== NFL draft ===
1975 Washington Redskins draft
Round	Pick	Player	Position	College	Notes
5	108	Mike Thomas *	Running back	UNLV	
6	147	Mark Doak	Tackle	Nebraska	
9	228	Dallas Hickman	Defensive end	California	
11	277	Ardell Johnson	Defensive back	Nebraska	
11	282	Jerry Hackenbruck	Defensive end	Oregon State	
13	334	Morris McKie	Defensive back	North Carolina A&T	
14	359	Dave Benson	Linebacker	Weber State	
15	384	Art Kuehn	Center	UCLA	
16	412	Dennis Pavelka	Guard	Nebraska	
17	437	Carl Taylor	Defensive end	Memphis State	
Made roster * Made at least one Pro Bowl during career

== Personnel ==
=== Staff / Coaches ===
1975 Washington Redskins staff
Front office: Majority Owner / Vice President – Edward Bennett Williams; Minority Owner / President – Jack Kent Cooke; General manager – George Allen; Executive assistant to the General Manager – C.A. Temerario; Assistant Public Relations Director – Charles M. Taylor; Assistant general manager / Admin Assistant / Administrative Assistant – Dick Meyers; Director of player personnel – C.A. Temerario; Director of College Scouting - Mike Allman; Director of Pro Scouting - Bobby Mitchell; Personnel Scout - Mike Faulkner; Personnel Scout - Tom Sullivan; Business Manager – Joel Margolis; Head coaches: Head Coach – George Allen; Offensive coaches: Offensive Coordinator – Charlie Waller; Running Backs – Joe Walton; Tight Ends / Wide Receivers – Dick Bielski; Offensive Line – Bill Austin	Defensive coaches: Defensive Coordinator – LaVern Torgeson; Assistant Defensive Coordinator / Special Assignments - Kirk Mee; Linebackers – George Dickson; Defensive Secondary / Special Assignments – Ralph Hawkins; Special teams coaches: Special Teams Coach – Paul Lanham; Strength and conditioning: Conditioning Coordinator - Jim Hiyler

=== Roster ===
1975 Washington Redskins roster
Quarterbacks (QB): 12 Randy Johnson; 17 Billy Kilmer; 7 Joe Theismann; Running backs (RB): 40 Bobby Anderson; 43 Larry Brown; 26 Bob Brunet; 44 Moses Denson; 36 Ralph Nelson; 22 Mike Thomas; Wide receivers (WR): 46 Frank Grant; 80 Roy Jefferson; 21 Larry Jones; 42 Charley Taylor; Tight ends (TE): 88 Alvin Reed; 87 Jerry Smith	Offensive linemen (OL): 66 Jim Arneson G; 56 Len Hauss C; 75 Terry Hermeling T; 54 Bob Kuziel C; 62 Ray Schoenke G; 76 Tim Stokes T; 78 Walt Sweeney G; Defensive linemen (DL): 77 Bill Brundige DT; 65 Dave Butz DT/DE; 61 Dennis Johnson DE; 79 Ron McDole DE; 64 Manny Sistrunk DT; 72 Diron Talbert DT	Linebackers (LB): 59 Brad Dusek OLB; 55 Chris Hanburger OLB; 53 Harold McLinton MLB; 52 John Pergine OLB; 67 Rusty Tillman MLB; 50 Pete Wysocki OLB; Defensive backs (DB): 41 Mike Bass CB; 25 Eddie Brown SS; 27 Ken Houston SS; 23 Brig Owens FS; 30 Bryant Salter FS; 24 Spencer Thomas CB; Special teams (ST): 4 Mike Bragg P; 3 Mark Moseley K; 51 Dan Ryczek LS	Reserve: 86 Verlon Biggs DE (IR); 37 Pat Fischer CB (IR); 84 Mike Hancock TE (IR); 82 Dallas Hickman DE (IR); 73 Paul Laaveg G (IR); 35 Felix Lobdell RB (IR); 57 Stu O'Dell LB (IR); 74 George Starke T (IR); 20 Ken Stone S (IR); Rookies in italics 43 active, 9 reserve, 0 practice squad

== Regular season ==
=== Schedule ===
Week	Date	Opponent	Result	Record	Venue	Attendance	Recap
1	September 21	New Orleans Saints	**W** 41–3	1–0	RFK Stadium	54,414	Recap
2	September 28	**New York Giants**	**W** 49–13	2–0	RFK Stadium	54,953	Recap
3	October 5	at **Philadelphia Eagles**	**L** 10–26	2–1	Veterans Stadium	64,397	Recap
4	October 13	**St. Louis Cardinals**	**W** 27–17	3–1	RFK Stadium	54,693	Recap
5	October 19	at Houston Oilers	**L** 10–13	3–2	Astrodome	49,566	Recap
6	October 26	at Cleveland Browns	**W** 23–7	4–2	Cleveland Municipal Stadium	56,702	Recap
7	November 2	**Dallas Cowboys**	**W** 30–24 (OT)	5–2	RFK Stadium	55,004	Recap
8	November 9	at **New York Giants**	**W** 21–13	6–2	Shea Stadium	57,242	Recap
9	November 16	at **St. Louis Cardinals**	**L** 17–20 (OT)	6–3	Busch Memorial Stadium	49,919	Recap
10	November 23	Oakland Raiders	**L** 23–26 (OT)	6–4	RFK Stadium	53,582	Recap
11	November 30	Minnesota Vikings	**W** 31–30	7–4	RFK Stadium	54,498	Recap
12	December 7	at Atlanta Falcons	**W** 30–27	8–4	Atlanta Stadium	52,809	Recap
13	December 13	at **Dallas Cowboys**	**L** 10–31	8–5	Texas Stadium	61,091	Recap
14	December 21	**Philadelphia Eagles**	**L** 3–26	8–6	RFK Stadium	49,385	Recap
Note: Intra-division opponents are in **bold** text.

=== Season summary ===
==== Week 2 ====
Team	1	2	3	4	Total
Giants	7	0	6	0	13
• Redskins	0	28	0	21	49

- Date: September 28
- Location: RFK Stadium, Washington, D.C.
- Game start: 1:00 p.m.
- Game weather: 65 °F (18 °C); wind 11 mph (18 km/h)

Scoring summary
1	NYG	Ron Johnson 1 yard run (George Hunt kick)	NYG 7–0
2	WSH	Larry Brown 4 yard run (Mark Moseley kick)	Tie 7–7
2	WSH	Roy Jefferson 31 yard pass from Billy Kilmer (Mark Moseley kick)	WSH 14–7
2	WSH	Ron McDole recovered fumble in end zone (Mark Moseley kick)	WSH 21–7
2	WSH	Larry Jones 52 yard punt return (Mark Moseley kick)	WSH 28–7
3	NYG	Jim Obradovich 2 yard pass from Craig Morton (kick failed)	WSH 28–13
4	WSH	Roy Jefferson 9 yard pass from Billy Kilmer (Mark Moseley kick)	WSH 35–13
4	WSH	Charley Taylor 13 yard pass from Randy Johnson (Mark Moseley kick)	WSH 42–13
4	WSH	Alvin Reed 4 yard pass from Randy Johnson (Mark Moseley kick)	WSH 49–13

==== Week 6 ====
Team	1	2	3	4	Total
• **Redskins**	0	6	3	14	23
Browns	0	0	7	0	7

- Date: October 26
- Location: Cleveland Municipal Stadium • Cleveland, Ohio
- Game start: 1:00 p.m.
- Game weather: 45 °F (7 °C) • Wind 7 mph (11 km/h)

Scoring summary
2	WSH	Mike Thomas 3 yard pass from Billy Kilmer (kick failed)	Redskins 6–0
3	WSH	Mark Moseley 37 yard field goal	Redskins 9–0
3	CLE	Oscar Roan 15 yard pass from Brian Sipe (Don Cockroft kick)	Redskins 9–7
4	WSH	Larry Brown 11 yard pass from Billy Kilmer (Mark Moseley kick)	Redskins 16–7
4	WSH	Mike Thomas 1 yard run (Mark Moseley kick)	Redskins 23–7

==== Week 7 ====
Team	1	2	3	4	OT	Total
Cowboys	0	17	0	7	0	24
• **Redskins**	3	7	7	7	6	30

- Date: November 2
- Location: RFK Stadium, Washington, D.C.
- Game start: 4:00 p.m. EST
- Game weather: 55 °F (13 °C), wind 6 mph (9.7 km/h)
- Referee: Fred Silva
- Source: Pro-Football-Reference.com

Scoring summary
1	WSH	Mark Moseley 43 yard field goal	Redskins 3–0
2	DAL	Preston Pearson 12 yard pass from Roger Staubach (Toni Fritsch kick)	Cowboys 7–3
2	DAL	Drew Pearson 10 yard pass from Roger Staubach (Toni Fritsch kick)	Cowboys 14–3
2	WSH	Frank Grant 46 yard pass from Billy Kilmer (Mark Moseley kick)	Cowboys 14–10
2	DAL	Toni Fritsch 33 yard field goal	Cowboys 17–10
3	WSH	Charley Taylor 2 yard pass from Billy Kilmer (Mark Moseley kick)	Tie 17–17
4	DAL	Cliff Harris 27 yard interception return (Toni Fritsch kick)	Cowboys 24–17
4	WSH	Jerry Smith 7 yard pass from Billy Kilmer (Mark Moseley kick)	Tie 24–24
OT	WSH	Billy Kilmer 1 yard run	Redskins 30–24

==== Week 8 ====
Team	1	2	3	4	Total
• Redskins	7	0	0	14	21
Giants	0	10	3	0	13

- Date: November 9
- Location: Shea Stadium, Flushing, New York
- Game start: 1:00 p.m.
- Game weather: 66 °F (19 °C); wind 10 mph (16 km/h)

Scoring summary
1	WSH	Frank Grant 96 yard pass from Billy Kilmer (Mark Moseley kick)	WSH 7–0
2	NYG	George Hunt 22 yard field goal	WSH 7–3
2	NYG	Ron Johnson 36 yard pass from Craig Morton (George Hunt kick)	NYG 10–7
3	NYG	George Hunt 22 yard field goal	NYG 13–7
4	WSH	Larry Brown 1 yard run (Mark Moseley kick)	WSH 14–13
4	WSH	Bob Brunet 2 yard run (Mark Moseley kick)	WSH 21–13

=== Standings ===
NFC East
	W	L	T	PCT	DIV	CONF	PF	PA	STK
^{(3)} St. Louis Cardinals	11	3	0	.786	6–2	9–2	356	276	W3
^{(4)} Dallas Cowboys	10	4	0	.714	6–2	8–3	350	268	W2
Washington Redskins	8	6	0	.571	4–4	7–4	325	276	L2
New York Giants	5	9	0	.357	1–7	3–8	216	306	W2
Philadelphia Eagles	4	10	0	.286	3–5	4–7	225	302	W1

== Postseason ==
For the first time since 1970, the Redskins did not qualify for the postseason in 1975.
