= 1976 Washington Redskins season =

NFL team season

- Owner: Edward Bennett Williams
- General manager: George Allen
- President: Edward Bennett Williams
- Head coach: George Allen
- Offensive coordinator: Charlie Waller
- Defensive coordinator: LaVern Torgeson
- Home stadium: RFK Stadium

Results
- Record: 10–4
- Division place: 2nd NFC East
- Playoffs: Lost Divisional Playoffs (at Vikings) 20–35

The 1976 Washington Redskins season was the franchise’s 45th overall and 40th in Washington, D.C. The season began with the team trying to improve on their 8–6 record from 1975, which they did, finishing 10–4, second in the NFC East behind the Dallas Cowboys. They would be eliminated from the NFL playoffs by the Minnesota Vikings by the score of 35–20. This was the first season as a Redskin for Hall of Fame running back John Riggins, signed as a free agent after spending the first five seasons of his career with the New York Jets. This was also the last season in which the Redskins would make the playoffs under Hall of Fame head coach George Allen.

== Offseason ==
=== NFL draft ===
1976 Washington Redskins draft
Round	Pick	Player	Position	College	Notes
5	148	Mike Hughes	Guard	Baylor	
6	179	Tommy Marvaso	Safety	Cincinnati	
7	234	Brian Fryer	Wide receiver	Alberta	
8	254	Curtis Akins	Guard	Hawaii	
10	272	Paul Strohmeier	Linebacker	Washington	
11	308	Dean Gissler	Defensive end	Nebraska	
12	342	Walter Tullis	Defensive back	Delaware State	
13	364	Wayman Britt	Defensive back	Michigan	
14	393	Quinn Buckner	Defensive back	Indiana	
15	426	John Monroe	Running back	Bluefield State	
17	476	Chuck Wills	Defensive back	Oregon	
Made roster

== Personnel ==
=== Staff / Coaches ===
1976 Washington Redskins staff
Front office: Majority Owner / Vice President – Edward Bennett Williams; Minority Owner / President – Jack Kent Cooke; General manager – George Allen; Executive assistant to the General Manager – C.A. Temerario; Assistant Public Relations Director – Charles M. Taylor; Assistant general manager / Admin Assistant / Administrative Assistant – Dick Meyers; Director of player personnel – C.A. Temerario; Director of College Scouting - Mike Allman; Director of Pro Scouting - Bobby Mitchell; Personnel Scout - Mike Faulkner; Personnel Scout - Tom Sullivan; Business Manager – Joel Margolis; Head coaches: Head Coach – George Allen; Offensive coaches: Offensive Coordinator – Charlie Waller; Running Backs – Joe Walton; Tight Ends / Wide Receivers – Dick Bielski; Offensive Line – Bill Austin	Defensive coaches: Defensive Coordinator – LaVern Torgeson; Assistant Defensive Coordinator / Special Assignments - Kirk Mee; Linebackers – George Dickson; Defensive Secondary / Special Assignments – Ralph Hawkins; Special teams coaches: Special Teams Coach – Paul Lanham

=== Roster ===
1976 Washington Redskins roster
Quarterbacks (QB): 17 Billy Kilmer; 7 Joe Theismann; Running backs (RB): 43 Larry Brown; 26 Bob Brunet; 35 Calvin Hill; 44 John Riggins; 22 Mike Thomas; Wide receivers (WR): 88 Danny Buggs; 46 Frank Grant; 80 Roy Jefferson; 24 Bill Malinchak; Tight ends (TE): 84 Jean Fugett; 87 Jerry Smith	Offensive linemen (OL): 66 Ted Fritsch C; 56 Len Hauss C; 75 Terry Hermeling G; 54 Bob Kuziel T; 62 Dan Nugent G; 64 Ron Saul G; 74 George Starke T; 76 Tim Stokes T; Defensive linemen (DL): 77 Bill Brundige DT/DE; 65 Dave Butz DT; 82 Dallas Hickman DE; 61 Dennis Johnson DE; 71 Karl Lorch DT; 79 Ron McDole DE; 72 Diron Talbert DT	Linebackers (LB): 59 Brad Dusek OLB; 55 Chris Hanburger OLB; 53 Harold McLinton MLB; 57 Stu O'Dell OLB; 67 Rusty Tillman MLB; 50 Pete Wysocki OLB; Defensive backs (DB): 25 Eddie Brown SS; 37 Pat Fischer CB; 27 Ken Houston SS; 20 Joe Lavender CB; 23 Brig Owens FS; 13 Jake Scott FS; 45 Gerard Williams CB; Special teams (ST): 4 Mike Bragg P; 3 Mark Moseley K	Practice squad: None - N/A; Reserve: -- Curtis Akins DE (IR); 85 Brian Fryer WR (IR); -- Ernie Janet G (IR); 21 Larry Jones WR (IR); 73 Paul Laaveg G (IR); -- Pete Solverson T (IR); 78 Walt Sweeney G (IR); 42 Charley Taylor WR (IR); -- David Thomas CB (IR); -- James Thompson WR (IR); 81 Doug Winslow WR (IR); Rookies in italics 43 active, 11 reserve, 0 practice squad

== Regular season ==
=== Schedule ===
Week	Date	Opponent	Result	Record	Venue	Attendance	Recap
1	September 12	**New York Giants**	**W** 19–17	1–0	RFK Stadium	54,245	Recap
2	September 19	Seattle Seahawks	**W** 31–7	2–0	RFK Stadium	53,174	Recap
3	September 27	at **Philadelphia Eagles**	**W** 20–17	3–0	Veterans Stadium	66,005	Recap
4	October 3	at Chicago Bears	**L** 7–33	3–1	Soldier Field	52,105	Recap
5	October 10	Kansas City Chiefs	**L** 30–33	3–2	RFK Stadium	53,060	Recap
6	October 17	Detroit Lions	**W** 20–7	4–2	RFK Stadium	45,908	Recap
7	October 25	**St. Louis Cardinals**	**W** 20–10	5–2	RFK Stadium	48,325	Recap
8	October 31	**Dallas Cowboys**	**L** 7–20	5–3	RFK Stadium	55,004	Recap
9	November 7	at San Francisco 49ers	**W** 24–21	6–3	Candlestick Park	56,134	Recap
10	November 14	at **New York Giants**	**L** 9–12	6–4	Giants Stadium	72,975	Recap
11	November 21	at **St. Louis Cardinals**	**W** 16–10	7–4	Busch Memorial Stadium	49,833	Recap
12	November 28	**Philadelphia Eagles**	**W** 24–0	8–4	RFK Stadium	54,292	Recap
13	December 5	at New York Jets	**W** 37–16	9–4	Shea Stadium	46,638	Recap
14	December 12	at **Dallas Cowboys**	**W** 27–14	10–4	Texas Stadium	59,916	Recap
Note: Intra-division opponents are in **bold** text.

== Game summaries ==
=== Week 1 (Sunday, September 12, 1976): vs. New York Giants ===
Week 1: New York Giants 17 at Washington Redskins 19 – Game summary

Quarter	1	2	3	4	Total
Giants (0–1)	3	7	0	7	17
Redskins (1–0)	0	3	9	7	19

at RFK Stadium • Washington, D.C.

- Date: September 12, 1976
- Game time: 1:00 p.m. EDT
- Game attendance: 54,245
- Referee: Ben Dreith
- TV announcers (CBS): Don Criqui (play-by-play) and Sonny Jurgensen (color commentator)

Team	Category	Player	Statistics
NYG	Passing	Craig Morton	13/26, 228 YDS, 2 TDs, 4 INTs
NYG	Rushing	Larry Csonka	23 CAR, 78 YDS
NYG	Receiving	Walker Gillette	5 REC, 105 YDS, 1 TD
WAS	Passing	Billy Kilmer	17/35, 257 YDS, 2 TDs, 1 INT
WAS	Rushing	Mike Thomas	17 CAR, 56 YDS
WAS	Receiving	Mike Thomas	5 REC, 54 YDS, 1 TD

Scoring summary

Quarter	Time	Drive			Team	Scoring information	Score	
Quarter	Time	Plays	Yards	TOP	Team	Scoring information	NYG	WAS
1					Giants	20-yard field goal by Danelo	3	0
2					Redskins	22-yard field goal by Moseley	3	3
2					Giants	Rhodes 63-yard touchdown reception from Morton, Danelo kick good	10	3
3					Redskins	Morton tackled in end zone for a safety by McDole	10	5
3					Redskins	Grant 53-yard touchdown reception from Kilmer, Moseley kick good	10	12
4					Giants	Gillette 62-yard touchdown reception from Morton, Danelo kick good	17	12
4					Redskins	Thomas 5-yard touchdown reception from Kilmer, Moseley kick good	17	19
"TOP" = time of possession. For other American football terms, see Glossary of American football.							17	19

- Point spread: Redskins –4½
- Time of game:

Giants	Game statistics	Redskins
14	First downs	17
40–96	Rushes–yards	31–89
228	Passing yards	257
13–26–4	Passes	17–36–1
2–7	Sacked–yards	3–24
221	Net passing yards	233
317	Total yards	322
52	Return yards	208
7–48.9	Punts	10–39.6
1–0	Fumbles–lost	3–2
6–55	Penalties–yards	13–120

== Playoffs ==
Round	Date	Opponent (seed)	Result	Venue	Attendance	Game recap
Divisional	December 18	at Minnesota Vikings (1)	L 20–35	Metropolitan Stadium	47,221	Recap

== Standings ==
NFC East
	W	L	T	PCT	DIV	CONF	PF	PA	STK
^{(2)} Dallas Cowboys	11	3	0	.786	6–2	9–3	296	194	L1
^{(4)} Washington Redskins	10	4	0	.714	6–2	9–3	291	217	W4
St. Louis Cardinals	10	4	0	.714	5–3	9–3	309	267	W2
Philadelphia Eagles	4	10	0	.286	2–6	4–8	165	286	W1
New York Giants	3	11	0	.214	1–7	3–9	170	250	L1
