= Jerry Smith (tight end) =

American football player (1943–1986)

No. 87
- Position: Tight end

Personal information
- Born: July 19, 1943; Eugene, Oregon, U.S.
- Died: October 15, 1986 (aged 43); Silver Spring, Maryland, U.S.
- Listed height: 6 ft 3 in (1.91 m)
- Listed weight: 208 lb (94 kg)

Career information
- High school: San Lorenzo (Ashland, California)
- College: Arizona State
- NFL draft: 1965: 9th round, 118th overall pick
- AFL draft: 1965: 18th round, 141st overall pick

Career history
- Washington Redskins (1965–1977)

Awards and highlights
- First-team All-Pro (1969); Second-team All-Pro (1967); 2× Pro Bowl (1967, 1969); 80 Greatest Redskins; Washington Commanders Ring of Fame

Career NFL statistics
- Receptions: 421
- Receiving yards: 5,496
- Receiving touchdowns: 60
- Stats at Pro Football Reference

Gerald Thomas Smith (July 19, 1943 – October 15, 1986) was an American professional football player who was a tight end for the National Football League (NFL)'s Washington Redskins for 13 seasons, from 1965 through 1977. By the time he retired, he held the NFL record for most career touchdowns by a tight end. Smith publicly announced he had AIDS in August 1986, being the first professional athlete to do so. He died two months later. A 2014 documentary from the NFL Network's A Football Life series profiles his career, as well as his "double life as a closeted gay man and a star athlete."

== Professional career ==
Smith attended Arizona State, where he did not play football until his junior season. Joining the team as a walk-on wide receiver in 1964, Smith caught 9 passes for 129 yards and 2 touchdowns in 9 games. The following season, Smith was converted to tight end, and went on to catch 42 passes for 618 yards and 5 touchdowns.

Selected in the ninth round (118th overall) of the 1965 NFL draft, - where his teammates included Charley Taylor, and his college friends included David Mixner - Smith was also drafted by the Kansas City Chiefs in the 18th round of the 1965 AFL Draft.

Smith developed his Redskins career as a running and catching tight end under head coaches Bill McPeak, Otto Graham and most memorably under Vince Lombardi, who had a positive approach to gay players. After Lombardi's death, under George Allen his role changed to mainly blocking, leading the team to Super Bowl VII at the end of the 1972 season. In the fourth quarter with the Redskins trailing the Miami Dolphins, quarterback Billy Kilmer tried a pass to Smith who was running across the end zone, but the ball hit the goal post. Although the Redskins lost the game 14–7, Sports Illustrated called Smith "an outstanding receiver among tight ends, with the ability to break open for a long gain."

In 1976 the Redskins signed the larger and faster Jean Fugett, whom Smith helped and assisted in his integration to the team. In the same year, he was quietly approached by Washington Star journalist Lynn Rosellini regarding her series of gay sports people. Smith contributed on the understanding that his name, team, or position would not be revealed. Rosellini opened her article with a description of Smith's hands, which led former teammate Dave Kopay to recognize the player as Smith, and hence led to Kopay telephoning Rosellini and becoming the first former football player to come out two days later.

Despite his skills having diminished, coach Allen kept bringing Smith back into the Redskins roster due to his work ethic. Smith made one catch in 1977, and spent the 1978 season on the injured list. Smith caught 421 passes, including 60 touchdowns, a career record for tight ends at the time and the 17th highest total in NFL history. His record held for 27 years, beaten by Shannon Sharpe on November 16, 2003. His 421 receptions were the third highest total by a tight end when he retired, trailing only Hall of Famers Mike Ditka and Jackie Smith. Smith was named All-Pro twice and held several NFL records that stood for years. In 2011, the Professional Football Researchers Association named Smith to the PRFA Hall of Very Good Class of 2011.

In 1971, as a part of a USO tour in association with the NFL, Smith, along with other stars John Brown, Butch Byrd, Fred Hoaglin, George Kunz, and Tom Woodeshick, visited and signed autographs for wounded military personnel in Vietnam.

From 1967 to 1970, Smith was a full time starter for the Redskins. He missed several games in 1971 to injury, but was back as a full-time starter the following season, and would be until his final season in 1977. During his career, Smith made several All-Pro teams.

== NFL career statistics ==
Legend
	Led the league
**Bold**	Career high

=== Regular season ===
Year	Team	Games		Receiving				
Year	Team	GP	GS	Rec	Yds	Avg	Lng	TD
1965	WAS	14	5	19	257	13.5	54	2
1966	WAS	14	14	54	686	12.7	35	6
1967	WAS	14	14	**67**	**849**	12.7	43	**12**
1968	WAS	13	13	45	626	13.9	**56**	6
1969	WAS	14	14	54	682	12.6	28	9
1970	WAS	14	14	43	575	13.4	41	9
1971	WAS	8	7	16	227	14.2	31	1
1972	WAS	14	14	21	353	**16.8**	34	7
1973	WAS	13	9	19	215	11.3	25	0
1974	WAS	14	14	44	554	12.6	30	3
1975	WAS	14	14	31	391	12.6	27	3
1976	WAS	13	2	7	75	10.7	20	2
1977	WAS	9	0	1	6	6.0	6	0
		168	134	421	5,496	13.1	56	60

=== Playoffs ===
Year	Team	Games		Receiving				
Year	Team	GP	GS	Rec	Yds	Avg	Lng	TD
1971	WAS	1	1	**3**	32	10.7	16	**1**
1972	WAS	3	2	1	11	11.0	11	0
1973	WAS	1	1	0	0	0.0	0	0
1974	WAS	1	1	2	**35**	17.5	20	0
1976	WAS	1	0	1	30	**30.0**	**30**	0
		7	5	7	108	15.4	30	1

== Coming out ==
After officially retiring at the end of the 1978 season, Smith quietly came out as gay to a few family members. This allowed him to explain why he moved to Austin, Texas, where he co-owned the gay bar "The Boathouse" – a decision he later regretted.

Smith moved back to the support of his family in Silver Spring, Maryland, in 1986, where, looking thinner and coughing, he was diagnosed at the Holy Cross Hospital with HIV. After discussing the matter with his family and friends, he contacted Washington Post journalist George Solomon – the ground rule being that they did not discuss how he got the disease – with the resultant front-page article published on August 7, 1986. He was subsequently visited and supported by all of his former teammates and coaches.

== Death and legacy ==
Smith died of AIDS at age 43 on October 15, 1986, at Holy Cross Hospital in Silver Spring, Maryland. He was the first former professional athlete to die of the disease. Although he acknowledged that he had AIDS, he never publicly acknowledged he was gay. At a funeral attended by all of his former teammates and coaches—some of whom also acted as pallbearers—Smith was buried at Gate of Heaven Cemetery in Silver Spring.

Head coach Vince Lombardi, who had a gay brother, demanded a homophobia-free locker room but "not even the legendary Lombardi could insulate him from the crippling societal homophobia of the era." Shortly before he died, Smith said: "Every important thing a man searches for in his life, I found in Coach Lombardi. He made us men."

Smith's sexuality was confirmed after his death by former teammate pro NFL football player David Kopay, who had come out years earlier. Kopay referred to a sexual encounter with Smith, using an alias for him, in his autobiography. After the book's publication, Smith never spoke to Kopay again. The Redskins logo, along with Smith's uniform number 87, was part of the AIDS quilt.

After a period of time post his death, some of Smith's teammates said they knew he was gay. Brig Owens, a safety for the Redskins at the time who also roomed with Smith, said Smith lived in fear, because if people knew he was gay, he would be done in football. He said Smith was afraid that people would take away something that he loved. Owens was one of the players on the team that knew for sure Smith was gay. Dave Kopay was briefly a teammate of Smith's. Kopay came out in 1976, after his playing career ended. He also wrote an autobiography about having a relationship with a teammate. Even though Kopay used an alias, Smith knew Kopay was talking about him. After the autobiography came out, Smith never spoke to Kopay again. Of all of his teammates, Smith was closer to Owens than perhaps anyone else. Their bond was so tight, Owens' own daughters referred to Smith as 'Uncle Jerry'. Redskins center Len Hauss was another close friend to Smith as well. On one occasion, a player said a word Hauss did not like (most likely a gay slur) and Hauss confronted the player and said he'd better not hear that word in the locker room again - and it never was again.

In 2014, the NFL network aired A Football Life: Jerry Smith. The hour-long show was about Smith, his career, and his death from AIDS. Brig Owens was interviewed during commercial breaks. When asked if Smith belongs in the Hall of Fame, Owens replied that Smith would be in the hall already if he was not gay.

== See also ==
- Homosexuality in American football

== Sources ==
- "Brief history of gay athletes". ESPN. December 18, 1998.
- Provenzano, Jim. "Who was the first gay football player to play in the Super Bowl?". Baltimore OUTloud. Archived from the original on January 11, 2008.
- Solomon, George (August 26, 1986). "Ex-Redskin Jerry Smith Says He's Battling AIDS;'Maybe It Will Help People Understand". Washington Post.
