= Verlon Biggs =

American football player (1943–1994)

No. 84, 86
- Position: Defensive end

Personal information
- Born: March 16, 1943; Moss Point, Mississippi, U.S.
- Died: June 7, 1994 (aged 51); Moss Point, Mississippi, U.S.

Career information
- College: Jackson State
- AFL draft: 1965: 3rd round, 20 (by the New York Jets)th overall pick

Career history
- New York Jets (1965–1970); Washington Redskins (1971–1974)

Awards and highlights
- Super Bowl champion (III); AFL champion (1968); 3× AFL All-Star (1966–1968); AFL sacks leader (1966); Second-team All-American (1964)

Career statistics
- Games played: 135
- Fumble recoveries: 14
- Touchdowns: 2
- Stats at Pro Football Reference

Verlon Marion Biggs (March 16, 1943 – June 7, 1994) was an American professional football player who was a defensive end in the American Football League (AFL) and National Football League (NFL). He had over 90 career quarterback sacks, and made an important play for the New York Jets in their Super Bowl III victory.

== Early life ==
Biggs was born on March 16, 1943, in Moss Point, Mississippi, one of nine children. He attended Magnolia High School, graduating in 1961.

== College football ==
Biggs attended Jackson State College (now Jackson State University), playing on the varsity football team 1961-64. He was All-Southwestern Athletic Conference (SWAC), 1963-64; and an National Collegiate Athletic Association (NCAA) All-American, 1963-64. The team won the SWAC championship in both 1961 and 1962.

== Professional football ==
Biggs was a 6 ft 4 in (1.93 m), 270 pound (122.5 kg), defensive end.

=== New York Jets ===
Biggs was selected by the New York Jets in the third round of the 1964 AFL draft (20th overall). In that same draft, the Jets selected future Pro Football Hall of Fame quarterback Joe Namath with their first pick (second overall), and 1964 Heisman Trophy winner John Huarte in the second round.

As a rookie in 1965, Biggs started 12 of 14 games for the Jets, with eight quarterback sacks, and one interception that he returned 44 yards. Biggs led the AFL in sacks in 1966, with 12.5, and also had a safety. United Press International (UPI) and the Newspaper Enterprise Association (NEA) named him first team All-AFL, and the AFL and the Associated Press (AP) named him second team All-AFL. He was also selected to play in the 1966 AFL All-Star Game, where he was named the game's most valuable player. The Jets had a 6–6–2 record.

In 1967, Biggs started all 14 games for the first time. He had 15 sacks and two fumble recoveries. Biggs was selected to the AFL All Star game in 1967, and was named second team All-AFL by the NEA and The Sporting News. The Jets finished the season with an 8–5–1 record.

The 1968 Jets went 11–3 in the regular season, then defeated the Oakland Raiders for the AFL championship (27–23), and would win Super Bowl III over the Baltimore Colts (16–7). Biggs played an important role in both of those games. Late in the AFL championship game, he sacked Oakland quarterback Daryle Lamonica on a fourth down and 10-yards to go play, to help seal a victory. In the Super Bowl, on the first play from scrimmage in the second half, Biggs forced a fumble that set up a field goal. Biggs had 10.5 sacks that year, and was again selected to play in the AFL All-Star Game. He defensive line coach that year was Buddy Ryan.

He had 10 sacks for the Jets in 1969, but only two in 1970. Still, he was described as a "bulwark" of the Jets 1970 defensive line that allowed the fewest rushing yards in the American Football Conference. Biggs had played the 1968 season through the Super Bowl without a signed contract, and went into the 1970 season in a contract dispute with the Jets (as did a few other Jets players). Biggs played out his option with the Jets in 1970. Hall of fame Jets coach Weeb Ewbank said of Biggs, "'He was a great team player who was always where he was supposed to be....'" But in May 1971, Ewbank, the Jets and Biggs could not reach a new contract, and Biggs left the team as a free agent.

=== Washington Redskins ===
After playing out his option with the Jets, at 28 years old Biggs signed on with the Redskins as a free agent in June 1971. As compensation, the Jets received Washington's top draft pick in the 1972 draft and another high pick from the following draft, but had to give Washington two medium round draft picks for 1972-73. Biggs played for Washington from 1971-74, but sat out 1975 with an injury; retiring after that.

His joining Washington coincided with future hall of fame coach George Allen coming to the team in 1971. Washington had improved under coaching legend Vince Lombardi in 1969, to have their first winning year since 1955, but Lombardi died before the start of the 1970 season. Under coach Bill Austin in 1970, Washington had a 6–8 record, with a defense ranked 24th out of 26 teams in total yards allowed (4,333), 21st in point allowed, and 25th in rushing yards allowed (2,068).

When Allen came to Washington, the defense already included All-Pro Pat Fischer, future Hall of Famer Chris Hanburger, Brig Owens and Mike Bass. In addition to bringing Biggs to Washington in 1971, Allen traded for veteran defensive players Jack Pardee, Maxie Baughan, Myron Pottios, Diron Talbert, and offensive lineman John Wilbur. After just one year, in 1971, Allen led the team to a 9–4–1 record. The 1971 team defense ranked fourth best in fewest points allowed (190), total yards allowed (3,523), and rushing yards allowed (1,396). Biggs started 13 games at right defensive end, with 5 sacks.

In 1972, Washington went 11–3, and defeated the Dallas Cowboys for the 1972 National Conference championship, on their way to Super Bowl VII (a 14–7 loss to the undefeated Miami Dolphins). The team gave up the third fewest points in the league and fourth fewest total yards allowed. Biggs had eights sacks that year, as well as two fumble recoveries, one of which he returned for a touchdown.

In 1973 and 1974, Washington would go to the playoffs again, but lose in the divisional round. In 1973, Biggs tied his career high in sacks (15) to go along with three fumble recoveries, again returning one for a touchdown. In his final season, 1974, he had 4 sacks and three more fumble recoveries.

Over his career, Biggs had 90.5 sacks, 14 fumble recoveries, an interception, a safety and two touchdowns.

== Honors ==
Biggs was inducted in the Jackson State Athletic Hall of Fame in 1990. In 2002, Biggs was inducted into the Mississippi Sports Hall of Fame. In 2023, he was inducted into the Moss Point Sports Hall of Fame.

== Personal life ==
He also spent time as a professional wrestler. After his wrestling career ended, he operated a small farm in Moss Point.

== Death ==
Biggs died of leukemia on June 7, 1994, at age 51.

== See also ==
- List of gridiron football players who became professional wrestlers

== See also ==
- List of American Football League players
