= Frank Grant (American football) =

American football player (born 1950)

No. 46, 83
- Position: Wide receiver

Personal information
- Born: February 15, 1950 (age 76); Brooklyn, New York, U.S.
- Listed height: 5 ft 11 in (1.80 m)
- Listed weight: 181 lb (82 kg)

Career information
- High school: East Side (NJ)
- College: Southern Colorado
- NFL draft: 1972: 13th round, 332nd overall pick

Career history
- Washington Redskins (1973–1978); Tampa Bay Buccaneers (1978)

Career NFL statistics
- Receptions: 149
- Receiving yards: 2,486
- Receiving touchdowns: 18
- Stats at Pro Football Reference

Frank Grant (born February 15, 1950) is an American former professional football player who was a wide receiver in the National Football League (NFL) for the Washington Redskins and the Tampa Bay Buccaneers. He played college football for the Southern Colorado Indians (now CSU Pueblo ThunderWolves) and was selected in the 13th round of the 1972 NFL draft.

== Early life ==
Born in Brooklyn, New York City, Grant was raised in Newark, New Jersey and attended East Side High School, where he played organized football for the first time despite having been told as a freshman that he was too small, at 140 pounds (64 kg), to play the sport competitively.

== NFL career statistics ==
Legend
| | Led the league |
| **Bold** | Career high |

=== Regular season ===
| Year | Team | Games | | Receiving | | | | |
| Year | Team | GP | GS | Rec | Yds | Avg | Lng | TD |
|---|---|---|---|---|---|---|---|---|
| 1973 | WAS | 13 | 0 | 1 | 12 | 12.0 | 12 | 1 |
| 1974 | WAS | **14** | 1 | 9 | 196 | **21.8** | 69 | 1 |
| 1975 | WAS | **14** | 9 | 41 | 776 | 18.9 | **96** | **8** |
| 1976 | WAS | **14** | **14** | **50** | **818** | 16.4 | 53 | 5 |
| 1977 | WAS | **14** | **14** | 34 | 480 | 14.1 | 59 | 3 |
| 1978 | WAS | 6 | 6 | 6 | 92 | 15.3 | 23 | 0 |
| 1978 | TAM | 10 | 4 | 8 | 112 | 14.0 | 20 | 0 |
| | | 85 | 48 | 149 | 2,486 | 16.7 | 96 | 18 |

=== Playoffs ===
| Year | Team | Games | | Receiving | | | | |
| Year | Team | GP | GS | Rec | Yds | Avg | Lng | TD |
|---|---|---|---|---|---|---|---|---|
| 1973 | WAS | **1** | 0 | 0 | 0 | 0.0 | 0 | 0 |
| 1974 | WAS | **1** | 0 | 1 | 15 | **15.0** | 15 | 0 |
| 1976 | WAS | **1** | **1** | **6** | **70** | 11.7 | **21** | **1** |
| | | 3 | 1 | 7 | 85 | 12.1 | 21 | 1 |
