= Billy Kilmer =

American football player (born 1939)

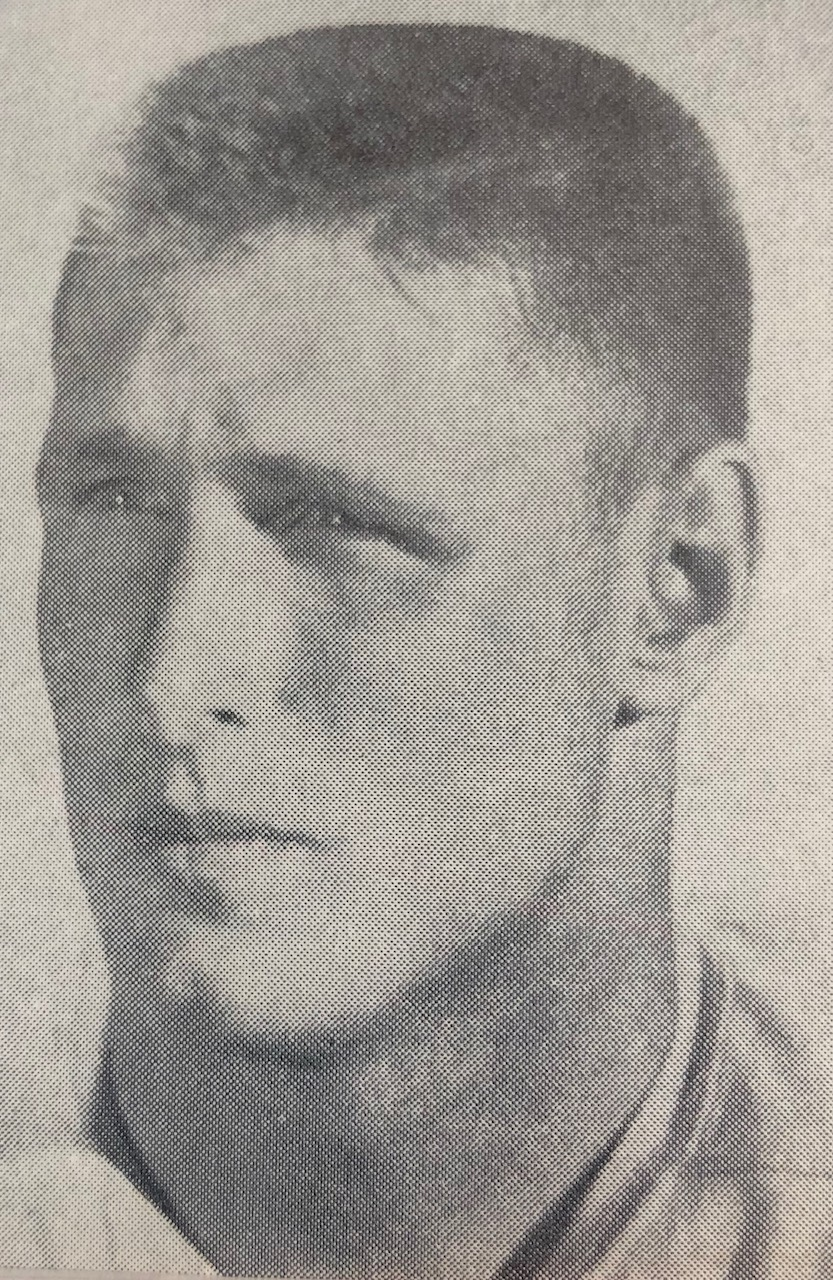
- Kilmer at UCLA, 1959

No. 17
- Positions: Halfback, quarterback

Personal information
- Born: September 5, 1939 (age 87); Topeka, Kansas, U.S.
- Listed height: 6 ft 0 in (1.83 m)
- Listed weight: 204 lb (93 kg)

Career information
- High school: Citrus Union (Azusa, California)
- College: Citrus JC (1957); UCLA (1958–1960)
- NFL draft: 1961: 1st round, 11th overall pick
- AFL draft: 1961: 5th round, 39th overall pick

Career history
- San Francisco 49ers (1961–1966); New Orleans Saints (1967–1970); Washington Redskins (1971–1978)

Awards and highlights
- Pro Bowl (1972); NFL passing touchdowns leader (1972); NFL passer rating leader (1972); George Halas Award (1976); 80 Greatest Commanders; Washington Commanders Ring of Fame; New Orleans Saints Hall of Fame; Voit Trophy (1960); Pop Warner Trophy (1960); First-team All-American (1960); First-team All-PCC (1960); NFL record: Rushing touchdowns by a quarterback in a game: 4 (tied with Bobby Douglass)

Career NFL statistics
- Passing attempts: 2,984
- Passing completions: 1,585
- Completion percentage: 53.1%
- TD–INT: 152–146
- Passing yards: 20,495
- Passer rating: 71.6
- Stats at Pro Football Reference
- College Football Hall of Fame

William Orland Kilmer Jr. (born September 5, 1939) is an American former professional football player who was a quarterback in the National Football League (NFL) for the San Francisco 49ers, New Orleans Saints, and Washington Redskins. He was also used as a running back, wide receiver, and punter. He played college football for the UCLA Bruins, then 18 seasons as a professional. In 1964, while playing running back for the 49ers, Kilmer played a supporting role in one of the most infamous incidents in gridiron history when Vikings defensive lineman Jim Marshall ran Kilmer's fumble back 66 yards into the wrong end zone. In January 1973, at the end of the 1972 NFL season, Kilmer was the losing quarterback in Super Bowl VII, when the Miami Dolphins completed the first and only perfect NFL season by defeating Kilmer's Washington Redskins 14–7.

== Early life ==
Born in Topeka, Kansas, Kilmer was raised in southern California and played baseball, football, and basketball at Citrus Union High School in Azusa, scoring more than 1,900 points in the latter sport while earning All-American honors. His 1,901 points set a CIF Southern Section record for points scored, later broken by future Major League Baseball pitcher Bart Johnson. His baseball exploits saw him win all-conference accolades, while the poor fortunes of his football squad saw him relegated to third-team all-conference recognition.

== College career ==
After graduation from high school in 1957, Kilmer competed in football for one year at Citrus Junior College, scoring six touchdowns and throwing for 15 more. A broken foot limited his playing time for the Citrus basketball team. He transferred to UCLA in 1958 and played three seasons. Kilmer also played on the Bruins basketball team in 1959–60 under head coach John Wooden. He capped off his college career with an outstanding senior season in 1960: he threw for over 1,000 yards, ran for over 800, scored eight touchdowns and served as the team's punter. Kilmer was also awarded the 1960 W.J. Voit Memorial Trophy as the outstanding football player on the Pacific Coast and finished fifth in voting for the Heisman Trophy.

After the conclusion of a UCLA career that saw him finish among the top five in school history for passing and rushing yards, as well as total offense, Kilmer played in the 1961 College All-Star Game, where he earned Most Valuable Player honors. He was inducted into the College Football Hall of Fame in 1999. There is some lingering controversy over exactly which position he played. His Hall of Fame plaque lists him as a halfback and says he "played tailback in UCLA's single-wing formation." Other sources list him as a quarterback.

== Professional career ==
=== San Francisco 49ers ===
Kilmer was the 11th overall selection of the 1961 NFL draft, taken by the 49ers. He was also selected in the fifth round of the 1961 AFL draft by the San Diego Chargers, but signed with San Francisco on December 30, 1960. During that rookie season in 1961, he saw action as a primarily running quarterback in Red Hickey's shotgun formation, rushing for 509 yards and ten touchdowns, with his top performance coming against the expansion Minnesota Vikings on October 15 when he rushed for four touchdowns.

The following year Kilmer was primarily used as a running back but his season came to an early end following a December 5 auto accident in which he fell asleep in his 1957 Chevrolet convertible and drove off the Bayshore Freeway into the San Francisco Bay. Suffering a fractured leg, Kilmer's injury was bad enough to also force him to sit out the entire 1963 NFL season. He was able to return the following year, but his production was limited.

His most memorable play as a 49er came in 1964 during a game against the Vikings at Kezar Stadium. Kilmer was playing wide receiver rather than quarterback. On October 25, 1964, Kilmer fumbled after catching a pass from George Mira. The fumble was recovered by Vikings defensive end Jim Marshall, who infamously ran 66 yards in the wrong direction. In spite of Marshall's gaffe, the Vikings still beat the 49ers, 27–22.

After he saw no action in 1965 and was involved in a training camp contract dispute the next season, Kilmer was placed in the 1967 NFL expansion draft.

=== New Orleans Saints ===
1969 Glendale stamp of Kilmer for New Orleans Saints

On February 10, 1967, Kilmer was one of two quarterbacks selected in the expansion draft by the New Orleans Saints. The Saints also acquired Gary Cuozzo in a trade with the Baltimore Colts. Cuozzo started 10 of the new team's 14 games, with Kilmer starting the other four. Kilmer was the starter for the team's first game, a 27–13 loss at home to the Los Angeles Rams. He was benched in favor of Cuozzo after the Saints lost their first three games.

Cuozzo was traded to the Minnesota Vikings during the off-season. Kilmer regained his starting quarterback job in 1968, and kept it until 1970.

His most prolific performance during his four-year stint with the Saints came in 1969, when he threw for 345 yards and six touchdowns in a 51–42 win over the St. Louis Cardinals on November 2.

Kilmer's last win as the Saints' starting quarterback came on week 8 of the 1970 season. Coach Tom Fears had benched Kilmer after three season-opening losses in favor of backup Edd Hargett. However, Fears was fired after week 7 and replaced by J. D. Roberts. The new coach brought Kilmer back as the starting quarterback. On November 8, 1970, in a home game versus the Detroit Lions, Kilmer led what proved to be a game-winning drive, although he could only bring the Saints as far as their own 44 yard line. With just one play left in the game, and his team down by a 17–16 margin, coach Roberts opted against asking Kilmer to go for a "Hail Mary" pass. Instead, kicker Tom Dempsey, who had earlier in the second half kicked an 8-yard field goal, was asked to attempt a 63-yard field goal. (The goal posts were still placed on the goal line in 1970, and not on the end line as they are today.) Dempsey made the kick, which broke the existing record by 7 yards. Only five longer field goals have been kicked since.

In a 2016 TV interview, recorded during a celebration of the Saints' 50th anniversary, Kilmer denied lingering rumors that he had been Dempsey's holder. "I got out of the holding business a while ago," Kilmer recalled, "but it was Joe Scarpati and it was a perfect hold." (Scarpati was a reserve defensive back.) Kilmer added, "when [Dempsey] kicked that ball, I knew he had made it. It was like Babe Ruth hitting a 500-foot home run. He really nailed it. And that was at sea level."

Frustrated after four years of the Saints' futility and sensing New Orleans would draft Ole Miss star Archie Manning with the second overall pick of the 1971 NFL draft, Kilmer asked to be traded and was granted his wish on January 23, 1971, when he was dealt to the Washington Redskins for linebacker Tom Roussel and two draft selections.

=== Washington Redskins ===
The trade which brought Kilmer to the Redskins was the first trade the team made after George Allen replaced Bill Austin (who had been the interim head coach since Vince Lombardi's untimely death in August 1970) as the head coach.

Kilmer seemed destined for a reserve role behind future Hall of Famer Sonny Jurgensen. However, this changed when Jurgensen suffered a severe shoulder injury in a pre-season game against the Miami Dolphins. Kilmer got the starting job and kept it for most of the next four seasons, but Jurgensen stayed on as his backup. The two players were friendly rivals during those years. Fans in Washington tended to be loyal to one quarterback or the other, sporting buttons at games that read "I like Billy" or "I like Sonny", with Kilmer's wobbly passes being a slight favorite over Jurgensen's tight spiral.

Kilmer then led the resurgent Redskins to a 5–0 start in 1971, but then the team ran into a midseason slump. Kilmer briefly lost his starting job as a result of the slide but regained it after Jurgensen again injured his shoulder. The next season, Kilmer led the 1972 team to an NFC-best 11–3 record, while also leading the NFL in touchdown passes (19) and passer rating (84.8). In the postseason, Washington advanced to the Super Bowl with their first postseason victories in 27 years. The final opponent would be the unbeaten Miami Dolphins, who were one win away from a Perfect season. Miami managed the strength of their rushing attack and selective passing from Bob Griese to two touchdowns while Washington had nothing to show for most of the game. Only a special-teams blunder saved the first shutout in Super Bowl history, as a blocked field goal-turned-fumble with two minutes remaining in the game by Garo Yepremian was recovered by Mike Bass of Washington for a touchdown. However, Washington could not finish the comeback, as Kilmer was sacked by Vern Den Herder as time expired with the team far from the end zone. For his part, Kilmer went 14-of-28 for 104 yards with three interceptions. The loss didn't dampen Kilmer's individual recognition as he was named to the Pro Bowl and the All-NFC Team.

In 1974, the Redskins acquired a third quarterback in Notre Dame star Joe Theismann who had been a star in the Canadian Football League for three seasons. Kilmer beat out both Jurgensen and Theismann for the starting job. Jurgensen retired at the end of the 1974 season. Kilmer remained with the Redskins until he retired after the 1978 season. 1978 was also the season when Theismann finally took over Kilmer's starting quarterback position, although Kilmer did start two games that season, winning one of them.

During his time with the Redskins, Kilmer became one of the few remaining users of a single-bar face mask on the helmet, as multi-bar face masks became the norm in the NFL. Theismann also wore the single-bar throughout his career. Kilmer finished his 18-year NFL career with 1,585 completions in 2,984 attempts for 20,495 yards and 154 touchdowns, with 146 interceptions. He also rushed for 1,509 yards and 21 touchdowns, caught 27 passes for 288 yards and one touchdown, and punted the ball 16 times for 598 yards.

== NFL career statistics ==
Legend
	Led the league
**Bold**	Career high

=== Regular season ===
Year	Team	Games			Passing									Rushing					Sacks	
Year	Team	GP	GS	Record	Cmp	Att	Pct	Yds	Y/A	Lng	TD	Int	Rtg	Att	Yds	Avg	Lng	TD	Sck	Yds
1961	SFO	11	0	0-0	19	34	55.9	286	8.4	28	0	4	44.1	**96**	**509**	5.3	31	**10**	8	71
1962	SFO	12	9	0-1	8	13	**61.5**	191	**14.7**	73	1	3	**91.5**	93	478	5.1	**35**	5	2	27
1964	SFO	10	2	0-0	8	14	57.1	92	6.6	24	1	1	71.1	36	113	3.1	14	0	2	24
1966	SFO	6	0	0-0	5	16	31.3	84	5.3	26	0	1	24.0	3	23	**7.7**	13	0	2	12
1967	NOR	10	4	0-4	97	204	47.5	1,341	6.6	**96**	6	11	56.4	20	142	7.1	31	1	18	147
1968	NOR	12	11	4-7	167	315	53.0	2,060	6.5	51	15	**17**	66.9	21	97	4.6	22	2	**26**	170
1969	NOR	14	14	5-9	**193**	**360**	53.6	**2,532**	7.0	52	20	**17**	74.9	11	18	1.6	12	0	22	**212**
1970	NOR	13	10	2-8	135	237	57.0	1,557	6.6	46	6	**17**	55.5	12	42	3.5	15	0	19	155
1971	WAS	14	13	**8-4-1**	166	306	54.2	2,221	7.3	71	13	13	74.0	17	5	0.3	3	2	16	110
1972	WAS	12	10	7-3	120	225	53.3	1,648	7.3	89	19	11	84.8	3	-3	-1.0	1	0	9	67
1973	WAS	10	10	7-3	122	227	53.7	1,656	7.3	64	14	9	81.3	9	10	1.1	5	0	15	88
1974	WAS	11	10	7-3	137	234	58.5	1,632	7.0	51	10	6	83.5	6	27	4.5	10	0	13	96
1975	WAS	12	12	**8-4**	178	346	51.4	2,440	7.1	**96**	**23**	16	77.2	11	34	3.1	11	1	23	138
1976	WAS	10	9	7-2	108	206	52.4	1,252	6.1	53	12	10	70.3	13	-7	-0.5	2	0	15	125
1977	WAS	8	8	5-3	99	201	49.3	1,187	5.9	59	8	7	66.5	10	20	2.0	12	0	22	180
1978	WAS	5	2	1-1	23	46	50.0	316	6.9	50	4	3	74.2	1	1	1.0	1	0	4	22
Career		170	124	61-52-1	1,585	2,984	53.1	20,495	6.9	96	152	146	71.6	362	1,509	4.2	35	21	216	1,644

=== Playoffs ===
Year	Team	Games			Passing									Rushing					Sacks	
Year	Team	GP	GS	Record	Cmp	Att	Pct	Yds	Y/A	Lng	TD	Int	Rtg	Att	Yds	Avg	Lng	TD	Sck	Yds
1971	WAS	1	1	0-1	11	27	40.7	106	3.9	16	2	1	61.7	1	0	0.0	0	0	1	13
1972	WAS	3	3	**2-1**	**35**	**60**	**58.3**	**398**	**6.6**	**51**	**3**	**3**	**74.2**	**6**	**36**	**6.0**	**9**	0	**3**	**23**
1973	WAS	1	1	0-1	13	24	54.2	159	**6.6**	30	1	1	71.4	0	0	0.0	0	0	0	0
1974	WAS	1	1	0-1	7	18	38.9	99	5.5	41	0	0	57.4	2	5	2.5	5	0	0	0
1976	WAS	1	1	0-1	26	49	53.1	298	6.1	30	2	2	68.2	0	0	0.0	0	0	1	8
Career		7	7	2-5	92	178	51.7	1,060	6.0	51	8	7	68.6	9	41	4.6	9	0	5	44

== Problems with alcohol ==
It was during the 1970 season, his last in New Orleans, that rumors stirred that Kilmer missed curfew before a game against the Denver Broncos.

Kilmer's most memorable night on the town came early Monday morning December 6, 1971 after beating the Giants 23–7. He got arrested at the Toddle House, a coffee shop in Arlington, Virginia. Apparently, Kilmer and an unidentified female friend attempted to pay a $4 tab (about $30 in 2023) with a $100 bill (about $743 in 2023) and an argument ensued with their waitress. A local police officer named Edmund D. Sheroshick showed up, and Kilmer, told the policeman, “If you think I’m wrong, put me in jail!” Officer Sheroshick did exactly that, but Kilmer was released in plenty of time for his next team practice. In the next few days, Kilmer won the hearts of fans by leading the Redskins to a 38–24 victory over the Los Angeles Rams on Monday Night Football which clinched a playoff berth, and also by telling the waitress she could keep the $100 as a tip. Ironically, Officer Sheroshick was disciplined after getting into an altercation of his own on early Christmas Eve morning at the same Toddle House. Even though he was off-duty and was not drunk, the officer had violated his department's rules by driving his cruiser while drinking.

On December 11, 1976, Kilmer was arrested for drunk driving less than two days before a game against the Dallas Cowboys. He was released in time to lead the Redskins to a 27–13 victory on Sunday, December 12, on the road at Texas Stadium.

== Post-playing career ==
Following his retirement, Kilmer stayed on the fringes while working for a gambling service that made selections on NFL games, but has since stayed out of the spotlight. Kilmer served as coach of the Shreveport Steamers of the American Football Association (a summer professional league) in 1979 and commissioner of the same league in 1981, but left as a result of numerous problems under his tenure as well as a lack of payment. He occasionally makes appearances in Mobile, Alabama, in support of the GMAC Bowl.

== See also ==
- List of NCAA major college football yearly total offense leaders
