= David Thomas (gridiron football) =

American gridiron football player (born 1951)

Profile
- Position: Cornerback

Personal information
- Born: September 11, 1951 (age 75); Newark, New Jersey
- Listed height: 5 ft 10 in (1.78 m)
- Listed weight: 175 lb (79 kg)

Career information
- High school: William M. Raines (FL)
- College: Texas Southern

Career history
- Memphis Southmen (1974–1975); Toronto Argonauts (1977–1978)

David "Peanuts" Thomas (born September 11, 1951) is an American former football cornerback.

Thomas was born in Newark, New Jersey in 1951 and attended William M. Raines High School in Jacksonville, Florida. He played college football at Texas Southern from 1970 to 1973.

He began playing professional football in the World Football League in 1974 and 1975 as cornerback and a punt and kick return specialist for the Memphis Southmen. He was named to the All-WFL team in 1974. He later played in the Canadian Football League (CFL) for the Toronto Argonauts. He appeared in ten CFL games during the 1977 and 1978 seasons.
