= Ken Stone (American football) =

American football player (born 1950)

No. 23, 20, 28
- Positions: Defensive back, wide receiver

Personal information
- Born: September 14, 1950 (age 76); Cincinnati, Ohio, U.S.
- Listed height: 6 ft 1 in (1.85 m)
- Listed weight: 179 lb (81 kg)

Career information
- High school: Forest Hill (FL)
- College: Vanderbilt
- NFL draft: 1973: 10th round, 245th overall pick

Career history
- Buffalo Bills (1973); Washington Redskins (1973-1975); Tampa Bay Buccaneers (1976); St. Louis Cardinals (1977–1980)

Awards and highlights
- First-team All-SEC (1972); Second-team All-SEC (1971)

Career NFL statistics
- Interceptions: 27
- Fumble recoveries: 8
- Total TDs: 1
- Stats at Pro Football Reference

Kenneth Bernard Stone Jr. (born September 14, 1950) is an American former professional football player who was a safety for eight seasons in the National Football League (NFL) with the Buffalo Bills, Washington Redskins, Tampa Bay Buccaneers, and St. Louis Cardinals. He played college football for the Vanderbilt Commodores and was selected in the 10th round of the 1973 NFL draft.
