= Bill Brundige =

American football player (1948–2018)

No. 77
- Position: Defensive lineman

Personal information
- Born: November 13, 1948; Holyoke, Colorado, U.S.
- Died: December 29, 2018 (aged 70); Knoxville, Tennessee, U.S.
- Listed height: 6 ft 5 in (1.96 m)
- Listed weight: 270 lb (122 kg)

Career information
- High school: Haxtun (CO)
- College: Colorado
- NFL draft: 1970: 2nd round, 43rd overall pick

Career history
- Washington Redskins (1970–1977)

Awards and highlights
- 70 Greatest Redskins; First-team All-American (1969); First-team All-Big Eight (1969)

Career NFL statistics
- Games played: 107
- Games started: 74
- Fumble recoveries: 5
- Stats at Pro Football Reference

William Glenn Brundige (November 13, 1948 – December 29, 2018) was an American professional football defensive end in the National Football League (NFL) for the Washington Redskins for eight seasons, from 1970 through 1977. He is currently sixth on the Redskins all-time sack list.

Born in Holyoke, Colorado, Brundige played high school football at tiny Haxtun in northeastern Colorado and then played college football at the University of Colorado in Boulder. He was a physics major at CU and also threw the shot put for the Colorado Buffaloes track and field team. After a senior season in 1969 in which he was named first-team All-America, he was selected in the second round of the 1970 NFL draft, 43rd overall, by head coach Vince Lombardi of the Redskins.

At age 21, he was a starter as a rookie in 1970 at defensive tackle. At the end of his third season in the NFL, Brundige became a part of both Redskin and Super Bowl lore in Super Bowl VII. He blocked the field goal attempt by Garo Yepremian that led to the bizarre fumble-return touchdown by Mike Bass that cut the Miami Dolphins' lead to 14–7 with just over two minutes remaining.

In 2002 for the Redskins' 70th anniversary, Brundige was named a member of the 70 Greatest Redskins.

After his playing days, Brundige was a general manager of Ford dealerships in the Shenandoah Valley region of Virginia in the city of Winchester and town of Front Royal.

Brundige died at his home in Knoxville, Tennessee on December 29, 2018, from cancer.
