= Mike Hancock (American football) =

American football player (born 1950)

No. 84
- Position: Tight end

Personal information
- Born: February 25, 1950 (age 76); Woodlake, California, U.S.
- Listed height: 6 ft 4 in (1.93 m)
- Listed weight: 220 lb (100 kg)

Career information
- College: Idaho State
- NFL draft: 1973: 8th round, 193rd overall pick

Career history
- Washington Redskins (1973–1974)

Career NFL statistics
- Receptions: 2
- Receiving yards: 3
- Receiving TDs: 2
- Stats at Pro Football Reference

Carl Michael Hancock (born February 25, 1950) is an American former professional football player who was a tight end in the National Football League (NFL) for the Washington Redskins. He played college football for the Idaho State Bengals and was selected in the eighth round of the 1973 NFL draft. He was traded to the Buffalo Bills in August 1975.
