= Mike Bass =

American football player (born 1945)

No. 26, 41
- Position: Cornerback

Personal information
- Born: March 31, 1945 (age 81); Ypsilanti, Michigan, U.S.
- Listed height: 6 ft 0 in (1.83 m)
- Listed weight: 190 lb (86 kg)

Career information
- High school: Ypsilanti
- College: Michigan
- NFL draft: 1967: 12th round, 314th overall pick

Career history
- Detroit Lions (1967); Washington Redskins (1969–1975)

Awards and highlights
- Second-team All-Pro (1974); Washington Commanders Ring of Fame (2022); 90 Greatest Commanders

Career NFL statistics
- Games played: 100
- Interceptions: 30
- Fumble recoveries: 6
- Touchdowns: 4
- Stats at Pro Football Reference

Michael Thomas Bass (born March 31, 1945) is an American former professional football player who was a cornerback for the Washington Redskins of the National Football League (NFL) from 1969 through 1975. He appeared in 104 consecutive games for the Redskins, recorded 30 interceptions, and scored the Redskins' only touchdown in Super Bowl VII on a 49-yard fumble return. In 2002, Bass was selected as one of the 70 greatest Redskins players of all time.

A native of Ypsilanti, Michigan, Bass played college football as a halfback for the Michigan Wolverines from 1964 through 1966. He also appeared in two games as a special teams player for the Detroit Lions in 1967.

== Early life ==
Bass was born in Ypsilanti, Michigan, in 1945. His father, Thomas Bass, was a physician, and his mother, Louise Bass, was a teacher. Bass attended Ypsilanti High School, where he participated in football, basketball, and track and field.

== University of Michigan ==
Bass received a scholarship to the University of Michigan in nearby Ann Arbor, enrolling in 1963, and played halfback for the Wolverines from 1964 to 1966. As a junior in 1965, Bass started one game at quarterback and two games at right halfback. As a senior in 1966, he started two games at left halfback and four games at right halfback. Although listed as a halfback, Bass played principally on defense and was limited to five carries on offense for 13 rushing yards. He graduated from Michigan in 1967 with a Bachelor of Arts degree in education.

== Professional football ==
Bass was selected by the Super Bowl champion Green Bay Packers in the twelfth round (314th overall) of the 1967 NFL/AFL draft. Before the start of the 1967 NFL season, the Packers sold Bass to the Detroit Lions. Bass spent most of the 1967 season on the Lions' taxi squad, but was activated late in the season and appeared in the last two games on special teams. He spent the 1968 season on the Lions' taxi squad. During his stint with the Lions, Bass had a small speaking part in the 1968 film Paper Lion.

In February 1969, Bass signed as a free agent with the Washington Redskins, now led by general manager and head coach Vince Lombardi. Bass spent the next seven seasons as a cornerback, appearing in 104 consecutive games for the Redskins between 1969 and 1975. In seven seasons with Washington, Bass recorded 30 interceptions for 478 return yards and three touchdowns. He also recovered six fumbles and gained 105 yards on eight kickoff returns; he gave up only eight touchdown passes in his NFL career.

In 1972, the Redskins defeated the defending Super Bowl champion Dallas Cowboys in the 1972 NFC Championship Game. The Redskins held the Cowboys to three points and limited quarterback Roger Staubach to 9 of 20 passing for 98 yards. The Redskins' cornerbacks, Bass and Pat Fischer, were credited with shutting down the Cowboys' wide receivers. The Redskins advanced to Super Bowl VII in Los Angeles, where they lost 14–7 to the undefeated Miami Dolphins. Bass scored Washington's only points when he picked up placekicker Garo Yepremian's botched pass, following a blocked field goal, and returned it 49 yards for a touchdown with just over two minutes remaining in the game. In 1974, Bass was selected as a first-team All-NFC player by the Associated Press, United Press International, and Sporting News.

In July 1976, Bass announced his retirement from football due to a neck injury the prior year that was re-injured during the 1976 pre-season. X-rays showed a change in the vertebra, and Bass said at the time he "didn't feel it necessary to take a chance." Bass was named one of the 70 Greatest Redskins in 2002 and was inducted in the Washington Ring of Fame in 2022.

== Later life ==
After retiring from the NFL, Bass moved to the Freeport, Bahamas, where he owned and operated the Channel House Resort Club. He returned to the United States in 1997, working as an academic counselor at the University of Florida. In 2002, Bass formed KimLou Global, LLC (KimLou), a real estate consulting firm.

Bass and his wife, Rosita, had two daughters, Kimberly and Louise.
