= Ron McDole =

American football player (born 1939)

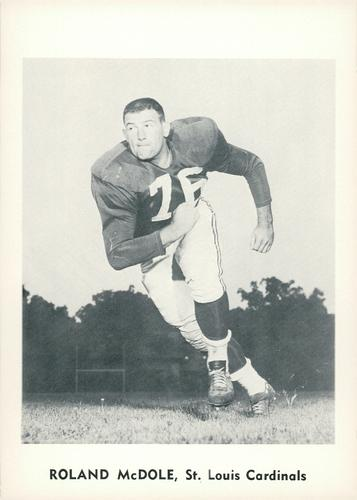
- McDole in 1961

No. 66, 84, 72, 79
- Positions: Defensive end, defensive tackle

Personal information
- Born: September 9, 1939 (age 87); Chester, Ohio, U.S.
- Listed height: 6 ft 4 in (1.93 m)
- Listed weight: 265 lb (120 kg)

Career information
- High school: DeVilbiss (Toledo, Ohio)
- College: Nebraska
- NFL draft: 1961: 4th round, 50th overall pick
- AFL draft: 1961: 4th round, 27th overall pick

Career history
- St. Louis Cardinals (1961); Houston Oilers (1962); Minnesota Vikings (1963)*; Buffalo Bills (1963–1970); Washington Redskins (1971–1978)
- * Offseason or practice squad member only

Awards and highlights
- 2× AFL champion (1964, 1965); 5× First-team All-AFL (1965, 1966, 1967, 1968, 1969); All-Time All-AFL Second Team; 90 Greatest Commanders; Second-team All-Big Eight (1960); NFL record: Most safeties in a season (2, tied)

Career NFL/AFL statistics
- Fumble recoveries: 14
- Interceptions: 12
- Touchdowns: 2
- Sacks: 77.5
- Stats at Pro Football Reference

Roland Owen (Ron) McDole (born September 9, 1939) is an American former professional football player who was a defensive end in the American Football League (AFL) and National Football League (NFL). He played college football for the Nebraska Cornhuskers.

== Early life ==
McDole was born in Chester, Ohio on September 9, 1939, to Burt and Ruth McDole. He played fullback, tackle and defensive end at DeVilbiss High School in Toledo, Ohio. He was also first baseman on the baseball team.

McDole had an opportunity to play baseball in the Detroit Tigers system, but chose instead to accept a scholarship to attend the University of Nebraska, where he would play football from 1957 to 1960. He played offensive end, right tackle, and defensive tackle on the football team. He was 6 ft 3 in (1.91 m), and started out at 192 pounds (87.1 kg), but eventually weighed 232 pounds (105.2 kg) at Nebraska.

As a sophomore he caught a game-winning touchdown pass, but was switched to offensive right tackle as a junior after gaining weight. He started every game as a junior, and became a co-captain as a senior with future NFL defensive back Pat Fischer (who would become his teammate in St. Louis and Washington). Future Minnesota Viking center Mick Tingelhoff was another teammate at Nebraska. During his junior and senior years, McDole played 1,074 out of a possible 1,200 minutes of game time.

McDole played in the Senior Bowl, the Blue-Gray game, and the Coaches All-America Game.

In 2022, he was inducted into Nebraska's Football Hall of Fame.

== Professional football career ==
In 1961, McDole was drafted in the fourth round by the St. Louis Cardinals in the NFL draft, and also in the fourth round of the AFL draft by the Denver Broncos of the new American Football League. He was also drafted by the Winnipeg Blue Bombers of the Canadian Football League. McDole chose the Cardinals and played one year on both the offensive and defensive lines, but was released.

Cardinals head coach Frank "Pop" Ivy left the Cardinals to coach the AFL Houston Oilers in 1962, and traded for the rights to McDole with Denver. He played defensive end and offensive tackle for the Oilers. McDole, however, only played four games as the result of either a head injury or migraine seizures. He did not play for Houston again. The Minnesota Vikings brought him in, but were concerned about his medical condition and he did not play there either, having received a letter (like every other team) from the Oilers about McDole's medical condition. During the time period he was not playing, he obtained his Bachelor's degree in industrial arts from Nebraska.

=== Buffalo Bills ===
Lou Saban coach of the AFL's Buffalo Bills wanted McDole to play for the Bills, and after McDole passed medical tests, owner Ralph Wilson agreed to sign him for the Bills. McDole never missed another game in his career. McDole has said his greatest inspiration came from Saban and Wilson "who 'gave me a chance after other teams counted me out'…"

McDole played in 12 games for the Bills in 1963, but did not start any. In 1964 he became the Bills starting left defensive end and held that position for the Bills from 1964 to 1970.

The Bills finished tied with the Boston Patriots for the AFL's Eastern Division title in 1963, losing the playoff game to the Patriots 26 to 8. They would win the division for the next three years, together with two American Football League championships, in 1964 and in 1965. McDole and his defensive linemates (left tackle Jim Dunaway, right tackle Tom Sestak, and right end Tom Day) held the opposition without a rushing touchdown in 17 straight games over the 1964–1965 seasons. The Bills lost the 1966 AFL championship game to the Kansas City Chiefs, who went on to play in the first Super Bowl. McDole was the defensive team captain during those years, and an AFL All-Star in 1965 and 1967.

The Associated Press (AP) named McDole first-team All-AFL in 1966 and second-team in 1967 and 1968; United Press International (UPI) named McDole first-team All-AFL in 1965 and second-team in 1966 and 1967; the Newspaper Enterprise Association (NEA) named him first-team AFL All-Pro in 1967, 1968, and 1969 and second-team in 1966; and he was selected to the All-Time All-AFL 1960s second team.

He was a roommate of quarterback and future U.S. Congressman and presidential candidate Jack Kemp.

In 1985, McDole was named to the Bills Silver Anniversary Team.

=== Washington Redskins ===
He was traded to Washington on May 11, 1971, becoming part of group of older players who came to be known as the Over-the-Hill Gang, including his old Nebraska teammate Pat Fischer. From 1971 through 1978, McDole was a key defensive player at left defensive end for Washington, under head coach George Allen from 1971 to 1977, and, in his final year, under head coach Jack Pardee. He had 9.5 sacks in 1976, a career high, and six in 1977, but would have none in 1978. By that time, he was quite slow, not a big threat as a pass-rusher, but very stout against the run, rarely out of position, and quick to seize opportunities for turnovers.

The Redskins won the NFC championship game in the 1972–73 NFL playoffs against the Dallas Cowboys. They limited the Cowboys to 3 points, 96 rushing yards on 21 carries, and, despite Hall of Fame player Roger Staubach as their quarterback, to 73 net passing yards. Staubach was under a heavy pass rush all game, and was sacked three times. McDole held his own against the opposing right offensive tackle, Rayfield Wright, a member of the Pro Football Hall of Fame; and he recovered a fumble. However, the team lost Super Bowl VII to the Miami Dolphins, though the defense gave up just 253 total net yards and allowed only 14 points.

On Washington's 70th anniversary in the NFL, McDole was named among the team's 80 greatest players.

=== Career ===
McDole has the most interceptions ever by a lineman, with 12, including one for a touchdown. He also had 14 fumble recoveries (one for a touchdown) and three safeties. He had 77.5 sacks, including 9.5 when he was 37 years old in his sixteenth season. As of 2024, he is also ranked tied for 84th on the all-time list of games played in the NFL (when including kickers). He played in 240 games, with 208 starts. As of 2022, only three defensive ends had more games and only six more starts. He identified Hall of Fame tackles Ron Mix and Rayfield Wright as the top offensive tackles he faced during his long career.

== Personal life ==
Teammate Sonny Jurgensen gave him the nickname "The Dancing Bear" after showing off his moves at a Georgetown nightspot. In 2018, McDole authored a book, The Dancing Bear: My Eighteen Years in the Trenches of the AFL and NFL.

== Post-football career ==
After retiring, McDole started a furniture company and later entered the millwork business. He also did remodeling work for real estate clients of Pat Fischer. His two furniture companies were Tammany Construction and Ron McDole Library Furniture, and built furniture for James Madison University and the Library of Congress. He had originally learned carpentry while a house flipping intern in college, which was another business he was involved in after his football career ended.

== See also ==
- List of American Football League players
