= Pat Fischer =

American football player (1940–2024)

No. 37
- Position: Cornerback

Personal information
- Born: January 2, 1940; St. Edward, Nebraska, U.S.
- Died: October 8, 2024 (aged 84); Ashburn, Virginia, U.S.
- Listed height: 5 ft 9 in (1.75 m)
- Listed weight: 170 lb (77 kg)

Career information
- High school: Westside (Omaha, Nebraska)
- College: Nebraska
- NFL draft: 1961: 17th round, 232nd overall pick

Career history
- St. Louis Cardinals (1961–1967); Washington Redskins (1968–1977)

Awards and highlights
- 2× First-team All-Pro (1964, 1969); 2× Second-team All-Pro (1965, 1972); 3× Pro Bowl (1964, 1965, 1969); George Halas Award (1978); 80 Greatest Redskins; Washington Commanders Ring of Fame

Career NFL statistics
- Interceptions: 56
- Interceptions yards: 941
- Touchdowns: 4
- Stats at Pro Football Reference

Patrick Fischer (January 2, 1940 – October 8, 2024) was an American professional football player who was a cornerback in the National Football League (NFL) for the St. Louis Cardinals from 1961 to 1967, and the Washington Redskins from 1968 to 1977. He played college football for the Nebraska Cornhuskers.

== Early life ==
Fischer was born January 2, 1940, in St. Edward, Nebraska. He was the eighth of nine children born to Joe and Viola Fischer. The family moved to Omaha in 1955 and as a junior he attended Westside High School in Omaha. He was named All-State in 1956. Fischer is a member of the Nebraska High School Sports Hall of Fame.

== College ==
He attended the University of Nebraska–Lincoln. At Nebraska, he played safety, tailback (as a sophomore and junior) and quarterback (senior year), and holds a school record 18.33 yard punt return average. In 1960, he was selected team captain along with future NFL teammate Ron McDole, and won Nebraska’s Tom Novak Trophy. In 1974, he was inducted into the Nebraska Football Hall of Fame. Three older brothers (Cletus, Kenneth and Rex) also played football at Nebraska, with two joining him in Nebraska’s Hall of fame.

== Professional career ==
=== St. Louis Cardinals ===
Fischer was pursued by both the National Football League and the American Football League, albeit late due to concerns over his size. He was selected by the St. Louis Cardinals in the 17th round of the 1961 NFL draft. He was also recruited by the Dallas Texans (who became the Kansas City Chiefs). He described the latter as a “fallback. I thought the NFL was the better league. If I didn’t make the Cardinals, I could always go on and try out for the Chiefs."

Fischer was used for occasional kick returns in his rookie season and he recorded no defensive statistics that year. That would change in his second season, in limited form. In the September 16 game against Philadelphia, he recorded his first interception off future hall of fame quarterback Sonny Jurgensen. He played in 12 of the Cardinals 14 games in 1962, starting 6 or 8 games. He recorded two more interceptions that season. He made improvement in time with the 1963 season, which saw him start all 14 games, with 8 total interceptions, including a two-interception game on December 8 against Philadelphia. Fischer again started all 14 games in 1964, with ten interceptions and two returned for touchdowns in back-to-back games, and two games with multiple interceptions.

In 1964, Fischer was named first-team All-Pro by the Associated Press (AP), United Press International (UPI), the Newspaper Enterprise Association (NEA), and first-team All-Conference by The Sporting News. He was also named to the Pro Bowl. In 1965, The Sporting News again selected Fischer as first-team All-Conference and UPI selected him second-team All-Pro. He was also chosen to play in the 1965 Pro Bowl.

=== Washington Redskins ===
Injuries limited Fischer in 1966, where he had just one interception. Fischer had disputes with Cardinal head coach Charley Winner that influenced him to leave the Cardinals in free agency. Fischer signed with Washington as a free agent in 1968. In the first of only four times the NFL exercised the Rozelle rule, the Cardinals received a 1969 second-round selection (35th overall–Rolf Krueger) and a 1970 third-round pick (69th overall–Colorado defensive back Eric Harris) as compensation. He was a 1969 Pro Bowler. The 1971 season saw the arrival of George Allen as head coach, and he instituted an approach to using veteran players exclusively to the point where his teams would be dubbed the "Over-the-Hill Gang", as the average age of starters was over the age of 30. Fischer would play a key part for the team in the following years.

In 1972, the Redskins won the NFC Championship Game of the 1972–73 NFL playoffs against the Dallas Cowboys. Washington limited future hall of fame quarterback Roger Staubach to only 9 completions in 20 attempts for 98 passing yards, and had three sacks. Fischer and Mike Bass, the other cornerback, were particularly successful in shutting down the Cowboys wide receivers, Ron Sellers, Billy Parks, and Lance Alworth, who had four combined catches for 65 yards. Washington lost in Super Bowl VII to the Miami Dolphins, 14-7. Although Washington's defense allowed only 69 net passing yards, it could not stop Miami's running game (184 rushing yards); though other than Larry Csonka’s single 49-yard run, the Dolphins had only 135 yards on 36 rushing attempts, with only 12 total first downs for the entire game (Washington having 16 first downs and 141 yards on 36 rushing attempts).

Fischer recorded his first and only playoff interception in 1974 against the Rams in a 19–10 loss in the Divisional Round. Fischer would record his last interception on December 5, 1976, against the New York Jets. He would play three games in the 1977 season, but not record a statistic in any of them. A back injury led to his retirement that year.

While playing for Washington, The Sporting News named him first-team All-Conference in 1968 and 1969, and the AP named him first-team All-Conference in 1975. The NEA selected Fischer second-team All-Pro in 1972.

== Legacy ==
Fischer finished his 17-year career with 56 interceptions, and he ranks seventh all-time in Washington career interceptions with 27 and fourth all-time with 412 career interception return yards. The 56 interceptions were tied for 6th most in NFL history. In a near half-century since his retirement, he still ranks among the top 20 all-time. At the time of his retirement, Fischer had played in 213 NFL games, then a record for a cornerback. He had a streak of 196 consecutive games started, which only ended because of an injury during his 15th NFL season.

He was well known for his strong tackling skills despite his diminutive size. Some of Fischer's most memorable defensive match-ups occurred against Philadelphia Eagles receiver Harold Carmichael who stood eleven inches taller than Fischer. Fischer's mantra "get a leg up and you own him" is used today to motivate and teach smaller defensive backs how to defend taller wide receivers. The 6 ft 8 in Carmichael said Fischer was one of his toughest defenders. Carmichael said one technique Fischer and Washington used against him was to cut his knees at the line of scrimmage as the play began, which Washington called the "Sequoia Ax"; and which is no longer permitted in the NFL.

Fischer's tackling technique applied to bigger running backs as well, like Jim Brown or Larry Csonka, "'Stay low, keep my head up and, when I make contact, lift and take one of his legs away from him. If I get him off the ground with one leg, I'm going to win the war, because now he doesn't have any power. He has to have both legs driving in order for him to run over me.'"

Fischer, alongside fellow Cardinal defensive back Larry Wilson were prolific defenders. The Cardinals, in attempting to deal with the problem of having a defensive hole left by a charging Wilson in the safety blitz, found a way to try and deal with the problem in the "Bump and run coverage", in which Fischer would physically harass receivers. Fischer was not the first to utilize the tactic, as it arguably started with Willie Brown early in the decade of the 1960s, but Fischer and defensive coordinator Chuck Drulis utilized the coverage to great effect. Fischer is considered one of the earliest to use the technique, which he believed originated with cornerback Abe Woodson, who became a teammate of Fischer's with the Cardinals in 1965-66.

In the late 1980s, NFL Films named Fischer as the Redskins All-Time Neutralizer sponsored by Tums. After retiring from the Redskins, Fischer worked as a stockbroker and owned a successful real estate business. In 2003, he was named to the Professional Football Researchers Association Hall of Very Good in the association's inaugural HOVG class.

Legendary football quarterback Johnny Unitas said of Fischer, "'if he hits you, he'll knock your socks off!'"

Fischer was nicknamed "The Mouse" for his relatively small size.

He is a member of the Washington Commanders Ring of Fame.

== Personal life and death ==
Fischer had two children. After retirement, he worked in real estate, investment banking, and public speaking. He also trained and owned racehorses.

In 2014, it was reported that Fischer was suffering from "dementia, cognitive decline, and severe memory loss" and was residing in an assisted-living facility in Ashburn, Virginia. Fischer died in Ashburn on October 8, 2024, at the age of 84.

== See also ==
- List of NCAA major college yearly punt and kickoff return leaders
- List of National Football League career interceptions leaders
