= Brig Owens =

American football player (1943–2022)

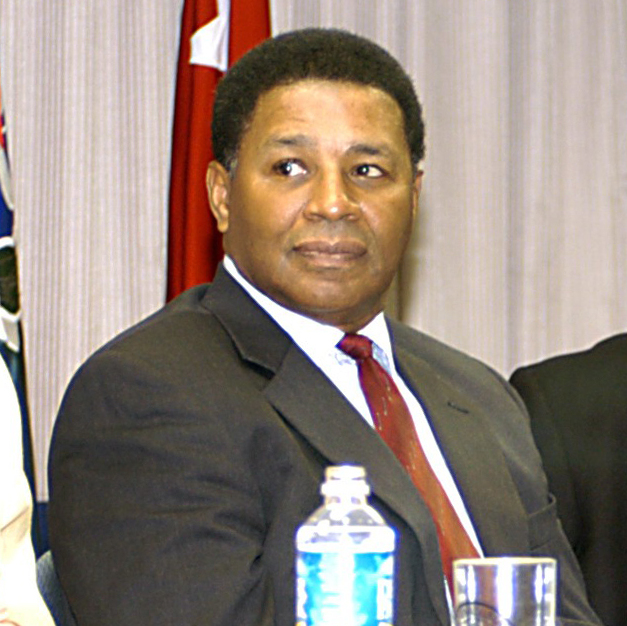
- Owens in 2007

No. 23
- Position: Safety

Personal information
- Born: February 16, 1943; Linden, Texas, U.S.
- Died: June 21, 2022 (aged 79); Maryland, U.S.
- Listed height: 5 ft 11 in (1.80 m)
- Listed weight: 190 lb (86 kg)

Career information
- High school: Fullerton Union (Fullerton, California)
- College: Cincinnati
- NFL draft: 1965: 7th round, 89th overall pick

Career history
- Dallas Cowboys (1965)*; Washington Redskins (1966–1977)
- * Offseason or practice squad member only

Awards and highlights
- 80 Greatest Redskins; Washington Commanders Ring of Fame

Career NFL statistics
- Interceptions: 36
- Fumble recoveries: 10
- Touchdowns: 5
- Stats at Pro Football Reference

Brigman P. Owens (February 16, 1943 – June 21, 2022) was an American professional football player who was a safety in the National Football League (NFL) for the Dallas Cowboys and Washington Redskins. He played college football at the University of Cincinnati.

== Early life ==
Owens attended Fullerton Union High School, where he played as a quarterback and defensive back. He also played basketball, baseball and track.

== College career ==
Owens enrolled at Fullerton Junior College, where he became the fifth member of his family to play sports at the school. As a freshman, he was named the starting quarterback and led the team to its first ever bowl game, the 1961 Orange Bowl Show. As a sophomore, he received junior college All-American honors.

In 1963, he transferred to the University of Cincinnati, where he became the school's first African American starter at quarterback. He posted 974 passing yards, 7 passing touchdowns, 556 rushing yards (led the team) and 6 rushing touchdowns (led the team), while ranking twelfth in the nation in total offense. He also served as a placekicker and punter.

As a senior, he led the team to a 10–1 record, which were the most wins in school history. He posted 790 passing yards, 6 passing touchdowns, 658 rushing yards and 6 rushing touchdowns. He was a passer, runner, and punter, finishing his college career with a 16–5 record, 2 Missouri Valley Conference titles, 1,764 passing yards, 13 passing touchdowns, 1,214 rushing yards and 12 rushing touchdowns.

In 1979, he was inducted into the University of Cincinnati Athletics Hall of Fame. In 1982, he was inducted into the Orange County Sports Hall of Fame. In 2005, he was inducted into the Fullerton College Athletics Hall of Fame. In 1990, he received the NCAA Silver Anniversary Award for his deep commitment to the community and country. In 2012, he was inducted into the California Community College Athletic Association hall of fame.

== Professional career ==
=== Dallas Cowboys ===
Owens was selected by the Dallas Cowboys in the seventh round (89th overall) of the 1965 NFL draft. He was converted into a safety during training camp. He spent most of the year on the team's taxi squad. On August 30, 1966, he was traded, along with Jake Kupp and Mitch Johnson, to the Washington Redskins for Jim Steffen and a fifth-round draft choice (#119-Willie Parker).

=== Washington Redskins ===
In 1970, he was named the starter at strong safety. He remained with the Redskins until he retired after the 1977 season. He played a significant role in leading the 1972 squad to Super Bowl VII and had a good performance in the game, recording a key interception from Miami Dolphins quarterback Bob Griese in the end zone during the second half.

One of his more memorable performances occurred on a 1966 regular season game against the New York Giants, where he scored two defensive touchdowns: a 62-yard interception return and a 62-yard fumble return. Washington ended up winning the game 72–41; to this day it is the highest scoring game in NFL history.

Owens holds the record for most interception return yards in Redskins history (686) and is second all-time for the Redskins in career interceptions (36). Three of his interceptions were returned for touchdowns. He also recovered ten fumbles, returning them for 143 yards and two touchdowns.

He was inducted into the Redskins' Ring of Fame.

== Personal life ==
After the NFL, Owens graduated from Antioch School of Law, and received his Doctorate of Jurisprudence from Potomac Law School, an unaccredited law school which closed in 1981. He served in the National Football League Players Association as an assistant executive director from 1979 to 1984. He also owned his own business, a commercial real estate development company which also represented professional athletes.

Owens was a member of Alpha Phi Alpha fraternity. Married to Patricia from 1965 until his death, the couple had two daughters, Robin and Tracy. He received an honorary doctoral degree from the University of Cincinnati in 2008. He died on June 21, 2022, at the age of 79.

Owens' grandson, Owen Wright, plays in the NFL for the Tampa Bay Buccaneers.
