= 1970 Washington Redskins season =

NFL team season

- Owner: Edward Bennett Williams
- General manager: Tim Temerario (de facto)
- President: Edward Bennett Williams
- Head coach: Vince Lombardi (offseason); Bill Austin (interim)
- Home stadium: RFK Stadium

Results
- Record: 6–8
- Division place: 4th NFC East
- Playoffs: Did not qualify

The 1970 Washington Redskins season was the franchise's 39th season in the National Football League (NFL) and their 34th in Washington, D.C. Vince Lombardi, who was hired the previous season, was diagnosed with terminal cancer in late June and died on September 3. In July, offensive line coach Bill Austin was named interim head coach.

The Redskins finished at 6–8 in 1970, fourth in the NFC East, but with a five-game losing streak in the second half of the season. The last loss was a 34–0 shutout at rival Dallas on December 6, and Washington fell to a 4–8 record and four games behind the Cowboys.

It was the 25th consecutive season that the Redskins did not advance to the playoffs. Austin's contract was not renewed after the season.

== Offseason ==
=== NFL draft ===
1970 Washington Redskins draft
| Round | Selection | Player | Position | College |
|---|---|---|---|---|
| 2 | 43 | Bill Brundige | Defensive tackle | Colorado |
| 4 | 103 | Paul Laaveg | Tackle | Iowa |
| 5 | 114 | Manny Sistrunk | Defensive tackle | Arkansas AM&N |
| 5 | 121 | Danny Pierce | Running back | Memphis State |
| 7 | 173 | Roland Merritt | Wide receiver | Maryland |
| 7 | 178 | Jimmy Harris | Cornerback | Howard Payne |
| 8 | 199 | Paul Johnson | Defensive back | Penn State |
| 9 | 225 | Ralph Sonntag | Tackle | Maryland |
| 11 | 277 | Mack Alston | Tight end | Maryland State |
| 12 | 303 | James Kates | Linebacker | Penn State |
| 13 | 329 | Joe Patterson | Tackle | Lawrence |
| 14 | 355 | Tony Moro | Running back | Dayton |
| 15 | 381 | Vic Lewandowski | Center | Holy Cross |
| 16 | 407 | Steve Bushore | Wide receiver | Emporia State |
| 17 | 433 | Earl Maxfield | Defensive tackle | Baylor |

== Roster ==
1970 Washington Redskins roster
| Quarterbacks (QB): 9 Sonny Jurgensen; 13 Frank Ryan; Running backs (RB): 43 Larry Brown; 26 Bob Brunet; 32 Henry Dyer; 31 Charley Harraway; 40 David Kopay; 19 Danny Pierce; Wide receivers (WR): 28 Jon Henderson; 24 Bill Malinchak; 47 Walter Roberts; 42 Charley Taylor; Tight ends (TE): 81 Mack Alston; 88 Pat Richter; 87 Jerry Smith | Offensive linemen (OL): 52 Gene Hamlin C; 56 Len Hauss C; 71 Terry Hermeling T; 73 Paul Laaveg G; 76 Walt Rock T; 66 Roy Schmidt G; 62 Ray Schoenke G; 74 Jim Snowden T; 75 Steve Wright T; Defensive linemen (DL): 83 Bruce Anderson DE; 71 Frank Bosch DE; 77 Bill Brundige DT; 89 Leo Carroll DE; 85 John Hoffman DE; 64 Manny Sistrunk DT; 78 Floyd Peters DT | Linebackers (LB): 55 Chris Hanburger OLB; 86 Marlin McKeever MLB; 53 Harold McLinton OLB; 54 Tom Roussel OLB; 67 Rusty Tillman MLB; Defensive backs (DB): 46 Rickie Harris FS; 41 Mike Bass CB; 37 Pat Fischer CB; 26 Jimmy Harris CB; 48 Jon Jaqua FS; 23 Brig Owens SS; 29 Ted Vactor CB; Special teams (ST): 4 Mike Bragg P; 5 Curt Knight K | Practice squad: 16 Gary Beban WR; -- Jim Ward QB; Reserve: 25 Roland Merritt WR (IR); 65 Vince Promuto G (IR); Rookies in italics |

== Regular season ==
=== Schedule ===
| Week | Date | Opponent | Result | Record | Venue | Attendance | Recap |
|---|---|---|---|---|---|---|---|
| 1 | September 20 | at San Francisco 49ers | **L** 17–26 | 0–1 | Kezar Stadium | 34,984 | Recap |
| 2 | September 27 | at **St. Louis Cardinals** | **L** 17–27 | 0–2 | Busch Memorial Stadium | 44,246 | Recap |
| 3 | October 4 | at **Philadelphia Eagles** | **W** 33–21 | 1–2 | Franklin Field | 60,658 | Recap |
| 4 | October 11 | Detroit Lions | **W** 31–10 | 2–2 | RFK Stadium | 50,414 | Recap |
| 5 | October 19 | at Oakland Raiders | **L** 20–34 | 2-3 | Oakland–Alameda County Coliseum | 54,471 | Recap |
| 6 | October 25 | Cincinnati Bengals | **W** 20–0 | 3–3 | RFK Stadium | 50,414 | Recap |
| 7 | November 1 | at Denver Broncos | **W** 19–3 | 4–3 | Mile High Stadium | 50,705 | Recap |
| 8 | November 8 | Minnesota Vikings | **L** 10–19 | 4–4 | RFK Stadium | 50,415 | Recap |
| 9 | November 15 | at **New York Giants** | **L** 33–35 | 4–5 | Yankee Stadium | 62,915 | Recap |
| 10 | November 22 | **Dallas Cowboys** | **L** 21–45 | 4–6 | RFK Stadium | 50,415 | Recap |
| 11 | November 29 | **New York Giants** | **L** 24–27 | 4–7 | RFK Stadium | 50,415 | Recap |
| 12 | December 6 | at **Dallas Cowboys** | **L** 0–34 | 4–8 | Cotton Bowl | 57,936 | Recap |
| 13 | December 13 | **Philadelphia Eagles** | **W** 24–6 | 5–8 | RFK Stadium | 50,415 | Recap |
| 14 | December 20 | **St. Louis Cardinals** | **W** 28–27 | 6–8 | RFK Stadium | 50,415 | Recap |
Note: Intra-division opponents are in **bold** text.

=== Standings ===
NFC East
| | W | L | T | PCT | DIV | CONF | PF | PA | STK |
|---|---|---|---|---|---|---|---|---|---|
| Dallas Cowboys | 10 | 4 | 0 | .714 | 5–3 | 7–4 | 299 | 221 | W5 |
| New York Giants | 9 | 5 | 0 | .643 | 6–2 | 6–5 | 301 | 270 | L1 |
| St. Louis Cardinals | 8 | 5 | 1 | .615 | 5–3 | 6–5 | 325 | 228 | L3 |
| Washington Redskins | 6 | 8 | 0 | .429 | 3–5 | 4–7 | 297 | 314 | W2 |
| Philadelphia Eagles | 3 | 10 | 1 | .231 | 1–7 | 1–9–1 | 241 | 332 | W1 |

Note: Tie games were not officially counted in the standings until 1972.
