= 1972 Washington Redskins season =

NFL team season (lost in Super Bowl)

- Owner: Edward Bennett Williams
- General manager: George Allen
- President: Edward Bennett Williams
- Head coach: George Allen
- Offensive coordinator: Ted Marchibroda
- Defensive coordinator: LaVern Torgeson
- Home stadium: RFK Stadium

Results
- Record: 11–3
- Division place: 1st NFC East
- Playoffs: Won Divisional Playoffs (vs. Packers) 16–3; Won NFC Championship (vs. Cowboys) 26–3; Lost Super Bowl VII (vs. Dolphins) 7–14
- Pro Bowlers: WR Charley Taylor; QB Billy Kilmer; C Len Hauss; RB Larry Brown; RLB Chris Hanburger

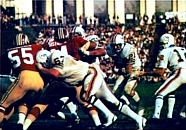
The Redskins playing against the Dolphins in Super Bowl VII.

The 1972 Washington Redskins season was the 41st in the National Football League (NFL) and the 36th in Washington, D.C. The Redskins were trying to build on the success of the previous season, in which they had finished 9–4–1 and made the postseason for the first time in 26 seasons. They ultimately finished the year 11–3, the best record in franchise history and only the second ten-win season in team history after 1942 (the win record would not be surpassed until the 1983 season).

Head coach George Allen, in just his second season with the team, took the Redskins to their first Super Bowl. The team, who had missed the postseason in the entirety of the 1950s and 1960s, won its first postseason game since 1943, and appeared in its first league championship game since 1945.

The NFC champion Redskins would ultimately lose a close Super Bowl VII, 14–7, to the undefeated Miami Dolphins.

The 1972 season was the first in which the team wore its longtime logo, which featured a Native American head in profile within a gold circle. The logo would stay with the team for the next 48 seasons until both it and the team nickname were retired after the 2019 season. With the Washington Senators relocating to Texas in 1971, the Baltimore Bullets not relocating until the summer of 1973, and the Washington Capitals having their inaugural season in 1974, the 1972 Redskins were at the time the D.C. area's only team playing in one of the major professional sports leagues in the United States and Canada.

Running back Larry Brown led the league with 101.3 yard per game (while rushing for 1,216 yards) on his way to be named league MVP, becoming the first Redskin to receive the honor.

== Offseason ==
=== NFL draft ===
1972 Washington Redskins draft
Round	Selection	Player	Position	College
8	203	Moses Denson	Running back	Maryland-Eastern Shore
9	229	Steve Boekholder	Defensive end	Drake
10	255	Mike Oldham	Wide receiver	Michigan
11	281	Jeff Welch	Defensive back	Arkansas Tech
12	307	Don Bunce	Quarterback	Stanford
13	332	Frank Grant	Wide receiver	Southern Colorado
15	365	Mike O'Quinn	Guard	McNeese State
15	385	Carl Taibi	Defensive end	Colorado
16	411	Steve Higginbotham	Defensive back	Alabama
17	437	Kevin Clemente	Linebacker	Boston College

== Roster ==
1972 Washington Redskins roster
Quarterbacks (QB): 17 Billy Kilmer; 18 Sam Wyche; Running backs (RB): 43 Larry Brown; 26 Bob Brunet; 31 Charley Harraway; 25 Mike Hull; 30 Jeff Jordan; 28 Herb Mul-Key; 40 George Nock; Wide receivers (WR): 80 Roy Jefferson; 85 Clifton McNeil; 42 Charley Taylor; Tight ends (TE): 81 Mack Alston; 87 Jerry Smith	Offensive linemen (OL): 58 George Burman C; 56 Len Hauss C; 75 Terry Hermeling T; 73 Paul Laaveg G; 76 Walt Rock T; 62 Ray Schoenke G/T; 60 John Wilbur G; Defensive linemen (DL): 89 Verlon Biggs DE; 77 Bill Brundige DT; 68 Mike Fanucci DE; 79 Ron McDole DE; 64 Manny Sistrunk DT; 72 Diron Talbert DT	Linebackers (LB): 55 Chris Hanburger OLB; 53 Harold McLinton MLB; 32 Jack Pardee OLB; 66 Myron Pottios MLB; 67 Rusty Tillman OLB; Defensive backs (DB): 41 Mike Bass CB; 45 Speedy Duncan CB/S; 37 Pat Fischer CB; 13 Alvin Haymond SS; 48 Jon Jaqua SS; 23 Brig Owens SS; 44 Jeff Severson FS; 22 Roosevelt Taylor FS; 29 Ted Vactor CB; Special teams (ST): 4 Mike Bragg P; 5 Curt Knight K	Practice squad: 39 Frank Grant WR; 63 Mitch Johnson T; 57 Steve Kiner LB; 19 Mike Taliaferro QB; Reserve: 71 Steve Boekholder DE (IR); 82 Jimmie Jones DE (IR); 9 Sonny Jurgensen QB (IR); 24 Bill Malinchak WR (IR); 16 Richie Petitbon S (IR); 74 Jim Snowden T (IR); Rookies in italics

== Preseason ==
=== Schedule ===
Week	Date	Opponent	Result	Record	Venue	Attendance	Recap
1	August 4	vs. Baltimore Colts (at Tampa, FL)	W 33–3	1–0	Tampa Stadium	42,864	
2	August 11	Denver Broncos	W 41–0	2–0	RFK Stadium	46,043	
3	August 18	Philadelphia Eagles	W 34–10	3–0	RFK Stadium	47,843	
4	August 25	at Detroit Lions	L 10–23	3–1	Tiger Stadium	52,647	
5	August 31	Miami Dolphins	W 27–24	4–1	RFK Stadium	52,098	
6	September 9	at Pittsburgh Steelers	T 10–10	4–1–1	Three Rivers Stadium	42,227	

=== Game summaries ===
==== Week P1: vs. Baltimore Colts ====
Preseason Week 1: Washington Redskins 33 vs. Baltimore Colts 3 – Game summary

Quarter	1	2	3	4	Total
Redskins	3	13	7	10	33
Colts	3	0	0	0	3

at Tampa Stadium, Tampa, Florida

- Date: August 4, 1972
- Game time: 8:00 p.m. EDT
- Game attendance: 42,864
- TV: WMAL-TV

==== Week P2: vs. Denver Broncos ====
Preseason Week 2: Denver Broncos 0 at Washington Redskins 41 – Game summary

Quarter	1	2	3	4	Total
Broncos	0	0	0	0	0
Redskins	7	10	14	10	41

at RFK Stadium, Washington, D.C.

- Date: August 11, 1972
- Game time: 8:05 p.m. EDT
- Game attendance: 46,043
- Referee: Fred Wyant
- TV: WMAL-TV

==== Week P3: vs. Philadelphia Eagles ====
Preseason Week 3: Philadelphia Eagles 10 at Washington Redskins 34 – Game summary

Quarter	1	2	3	4	Total
Eagles	7	3	0	0	10
Redskins	7	7	3	17	34

at RFK Stadium, Washington, D.C.

- Date: August 18, 1972
- Game time: 8:00 p.m. EDT
- Game attendance: 47,843
- TV: WMAL-TV

==== Week P4: at Detroit Lions ====
Preseason Week 4: Washington Redskins 10 vs. Detroit Lions 23 – Game summary

Quarter	1	2	3	4	Total
Redskins	3	0	7	0	10
Lions	0	20	3	0	23

at Tiger Stadium, Detroit, Michigan

- Date: August 25, 1972
- Game time: 9:00 p.m. EDT
- Game attendance: 52,647
- TV: CBS

==== Week P5: vs. Miami Dolphins ====
Preseason Week 5: Miami Dolphins 24 at Washington Redskins 27 – Game summary

Quarter	1	2	3	4	Total
Dolphins	7	0	14	3	24
Redskins	0	14	7	6	27

at RFK Stadium, Washington, D.C.

- Date: August 31, 1972
- Game time: 8:05 p.m. EDT
- Game attendance: 52,098
- Referee: Chuck Heberling
- TV: NBC

==== Week P6: at Pittsburgh Steelers ====
Preseason Week 6: Washington Redskins 10 vs. Pittsburgh Steelers 10 – Game summary

Quarter	1	2	3	4	Total
Redskins	10	0	0	0	10
Steelers	0	0	0	10	10

at Three Rivers Stadium, Pittsburgh, Pennsylvania

- Date: September 9, 1972
- Game time: 8:00 p.m. EDT
- Game attendance: 42,227
- Referee: Jim Tunney
- TV: WMAL-TV

== Regular season ==
=== Schedule ===
Week	Date	Opponent	Result	Record	Venue	Attendance	Recap
1	September 18	at Minnesota Vikings	**W** 24–21	1–0	Metropolitan Stadium	47,900	Recap
2	September 24	**St. Louis Cardinals**	**W** 24–10	2–0	RFK Stadium	53,039	Recap
3	October 1	at New England Patriots	**L** 23–24	2–1	Schaefer Stadium	60,999	Recap
4	October 8	**Philadelphia Eagles**	**W** 14–0	3–1	RFK Stadium	53,039	Recap
5	October 15	at **St. Louis Cardinals**	**W** 33–3	4–1	Busch Memorial Stadium	50,454	Recap
6	October 22	**Dallas Cowboys**	**W** 24–20	5–1	RFK Stadium	53,039	Recap
7	October 29	at **New York Giants**	**W** 23–16	6–1	Yankee Stadium	62,878	Recap
8	November 5	at New York Jets	**W** 35–17	7–1	Shea Stadium	63,962	Recap
9	November 12	**New York Giants**	**W** 27–13	8–1	RFK Stadium	53,039	Recap
10	November 20	Atlanta Falcons	**W** 24–13	9–1	RFK Stadium	53,034	Recap
11	November 26	Green Bay Packers	**W** 21–16	10–1	RFK Stadium	53,039	Recap
12	December 3	at **Philadelphia Eagles**	**W** 23–7	11–1	Veterans Stadium	65,720	Recap
13	December 9	at **Dallas Cowboys**	**L** 24–34	11–2	Texas Stadium	65,136	Recap
14	December 17	Buffalo Bills	**L** 17–24	11–3	RFK Stadium	53,039	Recap
Note: Intra-division opponents are in **bold** text.

=== Standings ===
NFC East
	W	L	T	PCT	DIV	CONF	PF	PA	STK
Washington Redskins	11	3	0	.786	7–1	10–1	336	218	L2
Dallas Cowboys	10	4	0	.714	6–2	7–4	319	240	L1
New York Giants	8	6	0	.571	5–3	7–4	331	247	W1
St. Louis Cardinals	4	9	1	.321	1–6–1	3–7–1	193	303	W2
Philadelphia Eagles	2	11	1	.179	0–7–1	0–10–1	145	352	L5

=== Game summaries ===
==== Week 1: at Minnesota Vikings ====
Week 1: Washington Redskins 24 at Minnesota Vikings 21 – Game summary

Quarter	1	2	3	4	Total
Redskins (1–0)	7	3	0	14	**24**
Vikings (0–1)	0	7	7	7	**21**

at Metropolitan Stadium, Bloomington, Minnesota

- Date: September 18, 1972
- Game time: 9:00 p.m. EDT
- Game weather: 66 °F (19 °C); relative humidity 67%; wind 11 miles per hour (18 km/h; 9.6 kn) (Mostly Cloudy)
- Game attendance: 47,900
- Referee: Norm Schachter
- TV announcers (ABC): Frank Gifford (play-by-play), Howard Cosell (color commentator) and Don Meredith (color commentator)

Team	Category	Player	Statistics
WAS	Passing	Billy Kilmer	7/17, 57 YDS, 1 INT
WAS	Rushing	Larry Brown	21 CAR, 105 YDS, 1 TD
WAS	Receiving	Roy Jefferson	4 REC, 38 YDS
MIN	Passing	Fran Tarkenton	18/31, 233 YDS, 2 TDs
MIN	Rushing	Oscar Reed	12 CAR, 68 YDS
MIN	Receiving	Bill Brown	5 REC, 47 YDS, 1 TD

Scoring summary

Quarter	Time	Drive			Team	Scoring information	Score	
Quarter	Time	Plays	Yards	TOP	Team	Scoring information	WAS	MIN
1		—	—	—	Redskins	Malinchak recovered blocked punt and returned 16 yards for a touchdown, Knight kick good	7	0
2					Vikings	Jones 1-yard touchdown run, Cox kick good	7	7
2					Redskins	30-yard field goal by Knight	10	7
3					Vikings	Gilliam 11-yard touchdown reception from Tarkenton, Cox kick good	10	14
4					Redskins	Brown 3-yard touchdown run, Knight kick good	17	14
4					Redskins	Harraway 9-yard touchdown run, Knight kick good	24	14
4					Vikings	Brown 4-yard touchdown reception from Tarkenton, Cox kick good	24	21
"TOP" = time of possession. For other American football terms, see Glossary of American football.							24	21

==== Week 2: vs. St. Louis Cardinals ====
Week 2: St. Louis Cardinals 24 at Washington Redskins 10 – Game summary

Quarter	1	2	3	4	Total
Cardinals (1–1)	0	3	7	0	**10**
Redskins (2–0)	7	10	7	0	**24**

at RFK Stadium, Washington, D.C.

- Date: September 24, 1972
- Game time: 1:00 p.m. EDT
- Game weather: 64 °F (18 °C); relative humidity 82%; wind 10 miles per hour (16 km/h; 8.7 kn) (Overcast)
- Game attendance: 53,039
- Referee: Pat Haggerty
- TV announcers (CBS): Jack Buck (play-by-play), Tom Brookshier (color commentator) and Andy Musser (studio reporter)

Team	Category	Player	Statistics
STL	Passing	Tim Van Galder	8/15, 85 YDS, 2 INTs
STL	Rushing	Donny Anderson	15 CAR, 32 YDS
STL	Receiving	Walker Gillette	5 REC, 91 YDS
WAS	Passing	Billy Kilmer	13/22, 97 YDS, 2 TDs
WAS	Rushing	Larry Brown	26 CAR, 148 YDS
WAS	Receiving	Charley Taylor	5 REC, 39 YDS

Scoring summary

Quarter	Time	Drive			Team	Scoring information	Score	
Quarter	Time	Plays	Yards	TOP	Team	Scoring information	STL	WAS
1					Redskins	Smith 6-yard touchdown reception from Kilmer, Knight kick good	0	7
2		—	—	—	Redskins	Bass recovered blocked field goal and returned 32 yards for a touchdown, Knight kick good	0	14
2					Cardinals	41-yard field goal by Bakken	3	14
2					Redskins	31-yard field goal by Knight	3	17
3					Redskins	Smith 5-yard touchdown reception from Kilmer, Knight kick good	3	24
3					Cardinals	Burns 1-yard touchdown run, Bakken kick good	10	24
"TOP" = time of possession. For other American football terms, see Glossary of American football.							10	24

==== Week 3: at New England Patriots ====
Week 3: Washington Redskins 23 at New England Patriots 24 – Game summary

Quarter	1	2	3	4	Total
Redskins (2–1)	0	14	0	9	**23**
Patriots (2–1)	0	7	10	7	**24**

at Schaefer Stadium, Foxborough, Massachusetts

- Date: October 1, 1972
- Game time: 1:00 p.m. EDT
- Game weather: 54 °F (12 °C); relative humidity 63%; wind 14 miles per hour (23 km/h; 12 kn) (Mostly cloudy)
- Game attendance: 60,999
- Referee: John McDonough
- TV announcers (CBS): Jack Whitaker (play-by-play), Jim Morse (color commentator) and Dick Stockton (studio reporter)

Team	Category	Player	Statistics
WAS	Passing	Billy Kilmer	14/30, 213 YDS, 3 TDs, 1 INT
WAS	Rushing	Larry Brown	20 CAR, 113 YDS
WAS	Receiving	Charley Taylor	7 REC, 134 YDS, 2 TDs
NE	Passing	Jim Plunkett	17/33, 255 YDS, 2 TDs
NE	Rushing	Josh Ashton	23 CAR, 108 YDS, 1 TD
NE	Receiving	Bob Windsor	5 REC, 58 YDS

Scoring summary

Quarter	Time	Drive			Team	Scoring information	Score	
Quarter	Time	Plays	Yards	TOP	Team	Scoring information	WAS	NE
2	12:50				Redskins	Taylor 30-yard touchdown reception from Kilmer, Knight kick good	7	0
2	10:04				Redskins	Taylor 4-yard touchdown reception from Kilmer, Knight kick good	14	0
2	3:46				Patriots	Ashton 2-yard touchdown run, Gogolak kick good	14	7
3	10:18				Patriots	Rucker 11-yard touchdown reception from Plunkett, Gogolak kick good	14	14
3	0:24				Patriots	42-yard field goal by Gogolak	14	17
4	9:18				Redskins	Smith 9-yard touchdown reception from Kilmer, Knight kick good	21	17
4	4:12				Patriots	Ashton 24-yard touchdown reception from Plunkett, Gogolak kick good	21	24
4	0:57	—	—	—	Redskins	Lougheed punt blocked through the end zone by Malinchak for a safety	23	24
"TOP" = time of possession. For other American football terms, see Glossary of American football.							23	24

==== Week 4: vs. Philadelphia Eagles ====
Week 4: Philadelphia Eagles 0 at Washington Redskins 14 – Game summary

Quarter	1	2	3	4	Total
Eagles (0–4)	0	0	0	0	**0**
Redskins (3–1)	0	0	14	0	**14**

at RFK Stadium, Washington, D.C.

- Date: October 8, 1972
- Game time: 1:00 p.m. EDT
- Game weather: 59 °F (15 °C); relative humidity 53%; wind 14 miles per hour (23 km/h; 12 kn) (Clear)
- Game attendance: 53,039
- Referee: Chuck Heberling
- TV announcers (CBS): Jack Buck (play-by-play), Tom Brookshier (color commentator) and Andy Musser (studio reporter)

Team	Category	Player	Statistics
PHI	Passing	John Reaves	16/31, 214 YDS, 1 INT
PHI	Rushing	Tony Baker	7 CAR, 32 YDS
PHI	Receiving	Ben Hawkins	6 REC, 97 YDS
WAS	Passing	Sonny Jurgensen	14/24, 237 YDS, 1 TD, 3 INTs
WAS	Rushing	Larry Brown	20 CAR, 79 YDS, 1 TD
WAS	Receiving	Larry Brown	6 REC, 58 YDS

Scoring summary

Quarter	Time	Drive			Team	Scoring information	Score	
Quarter	Time	Plays	Yards	TOP	Team	Scoring information	PHI	WAS
3					Redskins	Brown 2-yard touchdown run, Knight kick good	0	7
3					Redskins	Jefferson 35-yard touchdown reception from Jurgensen, Knight kick good	0	14
"TOP" = time of possession. For other American football terms, see Glossary of American football.							0	14

==== Week 5: at St. Louis Cardinals ====
Week 5: Washington Redskins 33 at St. Louis Cardinals 3 – Game summary

Quarter	1	2	3	4	Total
Redskins (4–1)	3	7	6	17	**33**
Cardinals (2–3)	0	0	3	0	**3**

at Busch Memorial Stadium, St. Louis, Missouri

- Date: October 15, 1972
- Game time: 2:00 p.m. EDT
- Game weather: 50 °F (10 °C); relative humidity 59%; wind 11 miles per hour (18 km/h; 9.6 kn) (Overcast)
- Game attendance: 50,454
- Referee: Jack Reader
- TV announcers (CBS): Lindsey Nelson (play-by-play), Jim Morse (color commentator) and Dick Stockton (studio reporter)

Team	Category	Player	Statistics
WAS	Passing	Sonny Jurgensen	13/18, 203 YDS, 1 INT
WAS	Rushing	Larry Brown	23 CAR, 110 YDS
WAS	Receiving	Roy Jefferson	4 REC, 91 YDS
STL	Passing	Gary Cuozzo	8/21, 86 YDS, 2 INTs
STL	Rushing	Donny Anderson	9 CAR, 34 YDS
STL	Receiving	Donny Anderson	4 REC, 28 YDS

Scoring summary

Quarter	Time	Drive			Team	Scoring information	Score	
Quarter	Time	Plays	Yards	TOP	Team	Scoring information	WAS	STL
1					Redskins	30-yard field goal by Knight	3	0
2					Redskins	Harraway 1-yard touchdown run, Knight kick good	10	0
3					Cardinals	46-yard field goal by Bakken	10	3
3					Redskins	8-yard field goal by Knight	13	3
3					Redskins	42-yard field goal by Knight	16	3
4					Redskins	36-yard field goal by Knight	19	3
4					Redskins	Harraway 4-yard touchdown run, Knight kick good	26	3
4					Redskins	Brunet 2-yard touchdown run, Knight kick good	33	3
"TOP" = time of possession. For other American football terms, see Glossary of American football.							33	3

==== Week 6: vs. Dallas Cowboys ====
Week 6: Dallas Cowboys 20 at Washington Redskins 24 – Game summary

Quarter	1	2	3	4	Total
Cowboys (4–2)	10	3	7	0	**20**
Redskins (5–1)	0	7	10	7	**24**

at RFK Stadium, Washington, D.C.

- Date: October 22, 1972
- Game time: 4:00 p.m. EDT
- Game weather: 52 °F (11 °C); relative humidity 64%; wind 10 miles per hour (16 km/h; 8.7 kn) (Partly cloudy)
- Game attendance: 53,039
- Referee: Bernie Ulman
- TV announcers (CBS): Ray Scott (play-by-play), Pat Summerall (color commentator) and Dick Stockton (studio reporter)

Team	Category	Player	Statistics
DAL	Passing	Craig Morton	14/27, 174 YDS, 1 TD, 2 INTs
DAL	Rushing	Calvin Hill	14 CAR, 61 YDS
DAL	Receiving	Bob Hayes	3 REC, 46 YDS
WAS	Passing	Sonny Jurgensen	11/16, 1980 YDS, 1 TD
WAS	Rushing	Larry Brown	26 CAR, 95 YDS, 1 TD
WAS	Receiving	Larry Brown	7 REC, 100 YDS, 1 TD

Scoring summary

Quarter	Time	Drive			Team	Scoring information	Score	
Quarter	Time	Plays	Yards	TOP	Team	Scoring information	DAL	WAS
1					Cowboys	Sellers 35-yard touchdown reception from Morton, Fritsch kick good	7	0
1					Cowboys	12-yard field goal by Fritsch	10	0
2					Redskins	Brown 19-yard touchdown reception from Jurgensen, Knight kick good	10	7
3					Cowboys	Garrison 1-yard touchdown run, Fritsch kick good	20	7
3					Redskins	Brown 34-yard touchdown run, Knight kick good	20	14
3					Redskins	42-yard field goal by Knight	20	17
4					Redskins	Harraway 13-yard touchdown run, Knight kick good	20	24
"TOP" = time of possession. For other American football terms, see Glossary of American football.							20	24

==== Week 7: at New York Giants ====
Week 7: Washington Redskins 23 at New York Giants 16 – Game summary

Quarter	1	2	3	4	Total
Redskins (6–1)	3	6	7	7	**23**
Giants (4–3)	0	6	3	7	**16**

at Yankee Stadium, Bronx, New York

- Date: October 29, 1972
- Game time: 1:00 p.m. EST
- Game weather: 61 °F (16 °C); relative humidity 91%; wind 11 miles per hour (18 km/h; 9.6 kn) (Overcast)
- Game attendance: 62,878
- Referee: Fred Swearingen
- TV announcers (CBS): Jack Whitaker (play-by-play), Jim Morse (color commentator) and Andy Musser (studio reporter)

Team	Category	Player	Statistics
WAS	Passing	Billy Kilmer	8/16, 114 YDS, 2 TDs, 1 INT
WAS	Rushing	Larry Brown	29 CAR, 191 YDS, 1 TD
WAS	Receiving	Roy Jefferson	3 REC, 46 YDS
NYG	Passing	Norm Snead	25/37, 258 YDS, 1 TD
NYG	Rushing	Ron Johnson	16 CAR, 80 YDS
NYG	Receiving	Bob Tucker	7 REC, 84 YDS, 1 TD

Scoring summary

Quarter	Time	Drive			Team	Scoring information	Score	
Quarter	Time	Plays	Yards	TOP	Team	Scoring information	WAS	NYG
1					Redskins	41-yard field goal by Knight	3	0
2					Giants	43-yard field goal by Gogolak	3	3
2					Redskins	Taylor 7-yard touchdown reception from Kilmer, Knight kick no good	9	3
2					Giants	14-yard field goal by Gogolak	9	6
3					Giants	22-yard field goal by Gogolak	9	9
3					Redskins	Brown 38-yard touchdown run, Knight kick good	16	9
4					Redskins	Smith 5-yard touchdown reception from Kilmer, Knight kick good	23	9
4					Giants	Tucker 10-yard touchdown reception from Snead, Gogolak kick good	23	16
"TOP" = time of possession. For other American football terms, see Glossary of American football.							23	16

==== Week 8: at New York Jets ====
Week 8: Washington Redskins 35 at New York Jets 17 – Game summary

Quarter	1	2	3	4	Total
Redskins (7–1)	7	14	7	7	**35**
Jets (5–3)	7	3	0	7	**17**

at Shea Stadium, Flushing, New York

- Date: November 5, 1972
- Game time: 1:00 p.m. EST
- Game weather: 45 °F (7 °C); relative humidity 86%; wind 13 miles per hour (21 km/h; 11 kn) (Overcast)
- Game attendance: 63,962
- Referee: Bob Frederic
- TV: NONE (International Brotherhood of Electrical Workers strike)

Team	Category	Player	Statistics
WAS	Passing	Billy Kilmer	7/16, 222 YDS, 3 TDs, 1 INT
WAS	Rushing	Larry Brown	16 CAR, 48 YDS
WAS	Receiving	Larry Brown	3 REC, 96 YDS, 1 TD
NYJ	Passing	Joe Namath	15/28, 148 YDS, 1 TD, 3 INTs
NYJ	Rushing	John Riggins	20 CAR, 85 YDS, 1 TD
NYJ	Receiving	Rich Caster	5 REC, 70 YDS

Scoring summary

Quarter	Time	Drive			Team	Scoring information	Score	
Quarter	Time	Plays	Yards	TOP	Team	Scoring information	WAS	NYJ
1					Redskins	Jefferson 46-yard touchdown reception from Kilmer, Knight kick good	7	0
1					Jets	Riggins 1-yard touchdown run, Howfield kick good	7	7
2					Jets	12-yard field goal by Howfield	7	10
2					Redskins	Taylor 70-yard touchdown reception from Kilmer, Knight kick good	14	10
2		—	—	—	Redskins	Interception returned 41 yards for touchdown by Hanburger, Knight kick good	21	10
3					Redskins	Brown 89-yard touchdown reception from Kilmer, Knight kick good	28	10
4					Jets	Maynard 15-yard touchdown reception from Namath, Howfield kick good	28	17
4		—	—	—	Redskins	Fumble recovery returned 16 yards for touchdown by Biggs, Knight kick good	35	17
"TOP" = time of possession. For other American football terms, see Glossary of American football.							35	17

==== Week 9: vs. New York Giants ====
Week 9: New York Giants 13 at Washington Redskins 27 – Game summary

Quarter	1	2	3	4	Total
Giants (5–4)	0	7	3	3	**13**
Redskins (8–1)	0	6	7	14	**27**

at RFK Stadium, Washington, D.C.

- Date: November 12, 1972
- Game time: 1:00 p.m. EST
- Game weather: 48 °F (9 °C); relative humidity 73%; wind 9 miles per hour (14 km/h; 7.8 kn) (Mostly clear)
- Game attendance: 53,039
- Referee: Pat Haggerty
- TV announcers (CBS): Ray Scott (play-by-play), Pat Summerall (color commentator) and Dick Stockton (studio reporter)

Team	Category	Player	Statistics
NYG	Passing	Norm Snead	14/26, 117 YDS, 2 INTs
NYG	Rushing	Ron Johnson	23 CAR, 96 YDS, 1 TD
NYG	Receiving	Joe Morrison	4 REC, 26 YDS
WAS	Passing	Billy Kilmer	15/23, 256 YDS, 1 TD, 1 INT
WAS	Rushing	Larry Brown	30 CAR, 106 YDS, 2 TDs
WAS	Receiving	Roy Jefferson	5 REC, 86 YDS

Scoring summary

Quarter	Time	Drive			Team	Scoring information	Score	
Quarter	Time	Plays	Yards	TOP	Team	Scoring information	NYG	WAS
2					Giants	Johnson 1-yard touchdown run, Gogplak kick good	7	0
2					Redskins	Smith 18-yard touchdown reception from Kilmer, Knight kick no good (blocked)	7	6
3					Giants	12-yard field goal by Gogolak	10	6
3					Redskins	Harraway 1-yard touchdown run, Knight kick good	10	13
4					Giants	23-yard field goal by Gogolak	13	13
4					Redskins	Brown 5-yard touchdown run, Knight kick good	13	20
4					Redskins	Brown 4-yard touchdown run, Knight kick good	13	27
"TOP" = time of possession. For other American football terms, see Glossary of American football.							13	27

==== Week 10: vs. Atlanta Falcons ====
Week 10: Atlanta Falcons 13 at Washington Redskins 27 – Game summary

Quarter	1	2	3	4	Total
Falcons (5–5)	7	3	0	3	**13**
Redskins (9–1)	0	7	14	3	**24**

at RFK Stadium, Washington, D.C.

- Date: November 20, 1972
- Game time: 9:00 p.m. EST
- Game weather: 40 °F (4 °C); relative humidity 90%; wind 11 miles per hour (18 km/h; 9.6 kn) (Cloudy)
- Game attendance: 53,039
- Referee: Jim Tunney
- TV announcers (ABC): Frank Gifford (play-by-play), Howard Cosell (color commentator) and Don Meredith (color commentator)

Team	Category	Player	Statistics
ATL	Passing	Bob Berry	11/21, 138 YDS, 1 TD, 1 INT
ATL	Rushing	Art Malone	15 CAR, 74 YDS
ATL	Receiving	Art Malone	6 REC, 52 YDS
WAS	Passing	Billy Kilmer	10/19, 109 YDS, 2 TDs, 1 INT
WAS	Rushing	Larry Brown	26 CAR, 82 YDS, 1 TD
WAS	Receiving	Roy Jefferson	4 REC, 42 YDS

Scoring summary

Quarter	Time	Drive			Team	Scoring information	Score	
Quarter	Time	Plays	Yards	TOP	Team	Scoring information	ATL	WAS
1					Falcons	Mitchell 36-yard touchdown reception from Berry, Bell kick good	7	0
2					Falcons	33-yard field goal by Bell	10	0
2					Redskins	Brown 1-yard touchdown run, Knight kick good	10	7
3					Redskins	Brown 28-yard touchdown reception from Kilmer, Knight kick good	10	14
3					Redskins	Smith 12-yard touchdown reception from Kilmer, Knight kick good	10	21
4					Falcons	17-yard field goal by Bell	13	21
4					Redskins	37-yard field goal by Knight	13	24
"TOP" = time of possession. For other American football terms, see Glossary of American football.							13	24

==== Week 11: vs. Green Bay Packers ====
Week 11: Green Bay Packers 16 at Washington Redskins 21 – Game summary

Quarter	1	2	3	4	Total
Packers (7–4)	3	3	0	10	**16**
Redskins (10–1)	0	14	0	7	**21**

at RFK Stadium, Washington, D.C.

- Date: November 26, 1972
- Game time: 1:00 p.m. EST
- Game weather: 44 °F (7 °C); relative humidity 87%; wind 10 miles per hour (16 km/h; 8.7 kn) (Half cloudy)
- Game attendance: 53,039
- Referee: John McDonough
- TV announcers (CBS): Jack Buck (play-by-play), Tom Brookshier (color commentator) and Tim Ryan (studio reporter)

Team	Category	Player	Statistics
GB	Passing	Jerry Tagge	3/14, 71 YDS
GB	Rushing	MacArthur Lane	17 CAR, 71 YDS, 1 TD
GB	Receiving	Dave Davis	2 REC, 40 YDS
WAS	Passing	Billy Kilmer	14/21, 158 YDS, 2 TDs
WAS	Rushing	Larry Brown	25 CAR, 69 YDS
WAS	Receiving	Charley Taylor	5 REC, 53 YDS, 1 TD

Scoring summary

Quarter	Time	Drive			Team	Scoring information	Score	
Quarter	Time	Plays	Yards	TOP	Team	Scoring information	GB	WAS
1					Packers	51-yard field goal by Marcol	3	0
2					Redskins	Brown 2-yard touchdown run, Knight kick good	3	7
2					Redskins	Smith 25-yard touchdown reception from Kilmer, Knight kick good	3	14
2					Packers	37-yard field goal by Marcol	6	14
4					Packers	Lane 6-yard touchdown run, Marcol kick good	13	14
4					Redskins	Taylor 5-yard touchdown reception from Kilmer, Knight kick good	13	21
4					Packers	39-yard field goal by Marcol	16	21
"TOP" = time of possession. For other American football terms, see Glossary of American football.							16	21

==== Week 12: at Philadelphia Eagles ====
Week 12: Washington Redskins 23 at Philadelphia Eagles 7 – Game summary

Quarter	1	2	3	4	Total
Redskins (11–1)	3	7	3	10	**23**
Eagles (2–9–1)	7	0	0	0	**7**

at Veterans Stadium, Philadelphia, Pennsylvania

- Date: December 3, 1972
- Game time: 1:00 p.m. EST
- Game weather: 46 °F (8 °C); relative humidity 78%; wind 12 miles per hour (19 km/h; 10 kn) (Clear)
- Game attendance: 65,720
- Referee: Fred Wyant
- TV announcers (CBS): Jack Whitaker (play-by-play), Jim Morse (color commentator) and Dick Stockton (studio reporter)

Team	Category	Player	Statistics
WAS	Passing	Billy Kilmer	12/15, 155 YDS, 1 TD
WAS	Rushing	Charley Harraway	20 CAR, 77 YDS
WAS	Receiving	Charley Taylor	5 REC, 75 YDS, 1 TD
PHI	Passing	John Reaves	7/21, 67 YDS, 1 TD
PHI	Rushing	Po James	10 CAR, 24 YDS
PHI	Receiving	Harold Jackson	2 REC, 21 YDS

Scoring summary

Quarter	Time	Drive			Team	Scoring information	Score	
Quarter	Time	Plays	Yards	TOP	Team	Scoring information	WAS	PHI
1					Redskins	9-yard field goal by Knight	3	0
1					Eagles	Carmichael 10-yard touchdown reception from Reaves, Dempsey kick good	3	7
2					Redskins	Harraway 1-yard touchdown run, Knight kick good	10	7
3					Redskins	14-yard field goal by Knight	13	7
4					Redskins	46-yard field goal by Knight	16	7
4					Redskins	Taylor 30-yard touchdown reception from Kilmer, Knight kick good	23	7
"TOP" = time of possession. For other American football terms, see Glossary of American football.							23	7

==== Week 13: at Dallas Cowboys ====
Week 13: Washington Redskins 24 at Dallas Cowboys 34 – Game summary

Quarter	1	2	3	4	Total
Redskins (11–2)	0	3	7	14	**24**
Cowboys (10–3)	14	14	3	3	**34**

at Texas Stadium, Irving, Texas

- Date: December 9, 1972
- Game time: 4:00 p.m. EST
- Game weather: 38 °F (3 °C); relative humidity 95%; wind 9 miles per hour (14 km/h; 7.8 kn) (Fog)
- Game attendance: 65,136
- Referee: Fred Swearingen
- TV announcers (CBS): Jack Whitaker (play-by-play), Jim Morse (color commentator) and Don Criqui (studio reporter)

Team	Category	Player	Statistics
WAS	Passing	Billy Kilmer	14/29, 178 YDS, 3 TDs, 2 INTs
WAS	Rushing	Herb Mul-Key	8 CAR, 60 YDS
WAS	Receiving	Charley Taylor	5 REC, 50 YDS, 2 TDs
DAL	Passing	Craig Morton	7/17, 61 YDS, 1 TD
DAL	Rushing	Walt Garrison	10 CAR, 121 YDS, 1 TD
DAL	Receiving	Calvin Hill	5 REC, 39 YDS, 1 TD

Scoring summary

Quarter	Time	Drive			Team	Scoring information	Score	
Quarter	Time	Plays	Yards	TOP	Team	Scoring information	WAS	DAL
1					Cowboys	Hill 10-yard touchdown run, Fritsch kick good	0	7
1					Cowboyss	Hill 26-yard touchdown reception from Morton, Fritsch kick good	0	14
2					Cowboys	Garrison 25-yard touchdown run, Fritsch kick good	0	21
2					Redskins	16-yard field goal by Knight	3	21
2					Cowboys	Morton 12-yard touchdown run, Fritsch kick good	3	28
3					Redskins	Taylor 10-yard touchdown reception from Kilmer, Knight kick good	10	28
3					Cowboys	36-yard field goal by Fritsch	10	31
3					Redskins	Jefferson 10-yard touchdown reception from Kilmer, Knight kick good	17	31
4					Redskins	Taylor 6-yard touchdown reception from Kilmer, Knight kick good	24	31
4					Cowboys	26-yard field goal by Fritsch	24	34
"TOP" = time of possession. For other American football terms, see Glossary of American football.							24	34

==== Week 14: vs. Buffalo Bills ====
Week 14: Buffalo Bills 24 at Washington Redskins 17 – Game summary

Quarter	1	2	3	4	Total
Bills (4–9–1)	10	0	0	14	**24**
Redskins (11–3)	0	7	10	0	**17**

at RFK Stadium, Washington, D.C.

- Date: December 17, 1972
- Game time: 1:00 p.m. EST
- Game weather: 22 °F (−6 °C); relative humidity 52%; wind 14 miles per hour (23 km/h; 12 kn); wind chill 5 °F (−15 °C) (Mostly clear)
- Game attendance: 53,039
- Referee: Dick Jorgensen
- TV announcers (NBC): Jim Simpson (play-by-play) and Kyle Rote (color commentator)

Team	Category	Player	Statistics
BUF	Passing	Dennis Shaw	10/21, 107 YDS, 2 INTs
BUF	Rushing	O. J. Simpson	26 CAR, 101 YDS, 1 TD
BUF	Receiving	Jan White	4 REC, 49 YDS
WAS	Passing	Billy Kilmer	4/15, 62 YDS, 3 INTs
WAS	Rushing	Herb Mul-Key	25 CAR, 95 YDS, 1 TD
WAS	Receiving	Herb Mul-Key	2 REC, 28 YDS

Scoring summary

Quarter	Time	Drive			Team	Scoring information	Score	
Quarter	Time	Plays	Yards	TOP	Team	Scoring information	BUF	WAS
1		—	—	—	Bills	Fumble recovery returned 49 yards for touchdown by Wyatt, Leypoldt kick good	7	0
1					Bills	23-yard field goal by Leypoldt	10	0
2					Redskins	Mul-Key 8-yard touchdown run, Knight kick good	10	7
3					Redskins	Brunet 2-yard touchdown run, Knight kick good	10	14
3					Redskins	35-yard field goal by Knight	10	17
4					Bills	Simpson 21-yard touchdown run, Leypoldt kick good	17	17
4					Bills	Braxton 4-yard touchdown run, Leypoldt kick good	24	17
"TOP" = time of possession. For other American football terms, see Glossary of American football.							24	17

== Stats ==
Passing

Passing
Player	Pos	G	GS	QBrec	Cmp	Att	Cmp%	Yds	TD	TD%	Int	Int%	Y/A	AY/A	Y/C	Y/G	Lng	Rate	Sk	Yds	NY/A	ANY/A	Sk%	4QC	GWD
Kilmer	QB	12	10	7–3–0	120	225	53.3	1,648	19	8.4	11	4.9	89	7.3	6.8	13.7	137.3	84.8	9	67	3.8	6.76	6.26	1	2
Jurgensen	QB	7	4	4–0–0	39	59	66.1	633	2	3.4	4	6.8	36	10.7	8.4	16.2	90.4	84.9	2	21	3.3	10.03	7.74	1	1
Team total		14		11–3–0	159	284	56.0	2,281	21	7.4	15	5.3	89	8.0	7.1	14.3	162.9	84.8	11	88	3.7	7.43	6.57	2	3
Opp total		14			186	367	50.7	2,130	10	2.7	17	4.6		5.8	4.26	11.5	152.1	58.3	35	268	8.7	4.6	3.2		

Rushing

Rushing
Player	Pos	G	GS	Att	Yds	TD	Lng	Y/A	Y/G	A/G
Brown	RB	12	12	285	1,216	8	38	4.3	101.3	23.8
Harraway	FB	14	14	148	567	6	24	3.8	40.5	10.6
Mul-Key	RB	2	1	33	155	1	35	4.7	77.5	16.5
Brunet	RB	14	1	30	82	2	18	2.7	5.9	2.1
Tayloe	WR	14	14	3	39	0	17	13.0	2.8	0.2
Nock	RB	7	0	6	22	0	6	3.7	3.1	0.9
Smith	TE	14	14	1	9	0	9	9.0	0.6	0.1
Kilmer	QB	12	10	3	–3	0	1	–1.0	–0.3	0.3
Jurgensen	QB	7	4	4	–5	0	0	–1.3	–0.7	0.6
Team total		14		513	2,082	17	38	4.1	148.7	36.6
Opp total		14		427	1,733	12		4.1	123.8	30.5

Receiving

Receiving
Player	Pos	G	GS	Rec	Yds	Y/R	TD	Lng	R/G	Y/G	Ctch%
Taylor	WR	14	14	49	673	13.7	7	70	3.5	48.1	0.0%
Jefferson	WR	14	14	35	550	15.7	3	45	2.5	39.3	0.0%
Brown	RB	12	12	32	473	14.8	4	89	2.7	39.4	0.0%
Smith	TE	14	14	21	353	16.8	7	34	1.5	25.2	0.0%
Harraway	FB	14	14	15	105	7.0	0	24	1.1	7.5	0.0%
Mul-Key	RB	2	1	4	66	16.5	0	28	2.0	33.0	0.0%
Alston	TE	14	0	2	53	26.5	0	36	0.1	3.8	0.0%
Brunet	RB	14	1	1	8	8.0	0	8	0.1	0.6	0.0%
Team total		14		159	2,281	14.3	21	89	11.4	162.9	
Opp total		14		186	1,862	10.0	10		13.3	133.0	

Kicking

Kicking
		Games		0–19		20–29		30–39		40–49		50+		Scoring						
Player	Pos	G	GS	FGA	FGM	FGA	FGM	FGA	FGM	FGA	FGM	FGA	FGM	FGA	FGM	Lng	FG%	XPA	XPM	XP%
Knight	K	14	0	4	4	3		11	6	8	4	4		30	14	46	46.7%	41	40	97.6%
Team total		14		4	4	3		11	6	8	4	4		30	14		46.7%	41	40	97.6%
Opp total		14												33	19		57.6%	23	23	100.0%

Punting

Punting
Player	Pos	G	GS	Pnt	Yds	Lng	Blck	Y/P
Bragg	P	14	0	59	2,273	62	0	38.5
Team total		14		59	2,273	62	0	38.5
Opp total		14		69	2,767			40.1

Kick return

Kick return
Player	Pos	G	GS	Rt	Yds	TD	Lng	Y/Rt
Duncan	DB	8	0	15	364	0	41	24.3
Haymond	DB	4	0	10	291	0	41	29.1
Mul-Key	RB	2	1	8	209	0	44	26.1
Brunet	RB	14	1	8	190	0	45	23.8
Bass	RCB	14	14	2	22	0	21	11.0
Tillman	LB	14	0	2	6	0	6	3.0
Vactor	DB	14	0	1	21	0	21	21.0
Fanucci	DE	14	0	1	15	0	15	15.0
McLinton	MLB	13	8	1	15	0	15	15.0
Team total		14		48	1,133	0	45	23.6
Opp total		14		53	1,191	0		22.5

Punt return

Punt return
Player	Pos	G	GS	Ret	Yds	TD	Lng	Y/R
Vactor	DB	14	0	17	88	0	28	5.2
Duncan	DB	8	0	11	70	0	18	6.4
Haymond	DB	4	0	6	1	0	6	0.2
Team total		14		34	159	0	28	
Opp total		14		19	39	0		

Sacks

Sacks
Player	Pos	G	GS	Sk
Biggs	RDE	14	14	8.0
Talbert	RDT	14	14	7.5
McDole	LDE	14	14	6.0
Pardee	LLB	14	14	4.0
Hanburger	RLB	14	14	3.5
Brundige	LDT	11	10	2.5
Sistrunk	DT	12	4	2.0
Jones	DE	3	0	1.0
Bass	RCB	14	14	0.5
Team total		14		35
Opp total		14		11

Interceptions

Interceptions
Player	Pos	G	GS	Int	Yds	TD	Lng	PD
Hanburger	RLB	14	14	4	98	1	41	
Fischer	LCB	14	14	4	61	0	35	
Bass	RCB	14	14	3	53	0	29	
McLinton	MLB	13	8	2	22	0	19	
Vactor	DB	14	0	1	28	0	28	
Taylor	FS	14	14	1	17	0	17	
Duncan	DB	8	0	1	8	0	8	
Owens	SS	14	11	1	0	0	0	
Team total		14		17	287	1	41	
Opp total		14						

Fumbles

Fumbles
Player	Pos	G	GS	FF	Fmb	FR	Yds	TD
Brown	RB	12	12		9	3	0	0
Vactor	DB	14	0		4	2	0	0
Jurgensen	QB	7	4		4	0	–9	0
Duncan	DB	8	0		2	1	0	0
Harraway	FB	14	14		2	0	0	0
Jefferson	WR	14	14		1	1	0	0
Nock	RB	7	0		1	1	0	0
Taylor	WR	14	14		1	1	9	0
Brunet	RB	14	1		1	0	0	0
Kilmer	QB	12	10		1	0	0	0
Mul-Key	RB	2	1		1	0	0	0
Biggs	RDE	14	14		0	2	16	1
Laaveg	LG	14	14		0	2	2	0
Hanburger	RLB	14	14		0	2	0	0
Pardee	LLB	13	13		0	2	0	0
Pottios	MLB	12	7		0	2	0	0
Rock	RT	14	14		0	2	0	0
Owens	SS	14	11		0	1	5	0
Petitbon	DB	3	3		0	1	5	0
Alston	TE	14	0		0	1	0	0
Fischer	LCB	14	14		0	1	0	0
Hermeling	LT	14	14		0	1	0	0
Malinchak	WR	6	0		0	1	0	0
McLinton	MLB	13	8		0	1	0	0
Schoenke	G	12	0		0	1	0	0
Talbert	RDT	14	14		0	1	0	0
Team total		14			27	30	28	1
Opp total		14			28	13		0

Tackles

Tackles
Player	Pos	G	GS	Comb	Solo	Ast	TFL	QBHits	Sfty
Malinchak	WR	6	0						1
Team total		14							1
Opp total		14							

Scoring summary

Scoring summary
Player	Pos	G	GS	RshTD	RecTD	PR TD	KR TD	FblTD	IntTD	OthTD	AllTD	XPM	XPA	FGM	FGA	Sfty	Pts	Pts/G
Knight	K	14	0									40	41	14	30		82	5.9
Brown	RB	12	12	8	4						12						72	6.0
Smith	TE	14	14		7						7						42	3.0
Taylor	WR	14	14		7						7						42	3.0
Harraway	FB	14	14	6							6						36	2.6
Jefferson	WR	14	14		3						3						18	1.3
Brunet	RB	14	1	2							2						12	0.9
Malinchak	WR	6	0							1	1					1	8	1.3
Bass	RCB	14	14							1	1						6	0.4
Biggs	RDE	14	14					1			1						6	0.4
Hanburger	RLB	14	14						1		1						6	0.4
Mul-Key	RB	2	1	1							1						6	3.0
Team total		14		17	21			1	1	2	42	40	41	14	30	1	336	
Opp total		14		12	10				1		23	23	23	19	33		218	

Team

Team
			Total yds & TO					Passing							Rushing					Penalties		
Player	PF	Yds	Ply	Y/P	TO	FL	1stD	Cmp	Att	Yds	TD	Int	NY/A	1stD	Att	Yds	TD	Y/A	1stD	Pen	Yds	1stPy
Team Stats	336	4,275	808	5.3	26	11	235	159	284	2,193	21	15	7.4	106	513	2,082	17	4.1	110	78	721	19
Opp Stats	218	3,595	829	4.3	32	15	223	186	367	1,862	10	17	4.6	108	427	1,733	12	4.1	95	64	568	20
Lg Rank Offense	7	11			3	8	14		23	12	3	8	2		6	10	6	14				
Lg Rank Defense	3	4			14	10	9		21	6	3	16	4		4	7	10	13				

Quarter-by-quarter

Quarter-by-quarter
Team	1	2	3	4	T
Redskins	30	105	92	109	336
Opponent	58	56	43	61	218

== Postseason ==
=== Schedule ===
Round	Date	Opponent (seed)	Result	Record	Venue	Sources
Divisional	December 24	Green Bay Packers	W 16–3	RFK Stadium	53,140	Recap
NFC Championship	December 31	Dallas Cowboys	W 26–3	RFK Stadium	53,129	Recap
Super Bowl VII	January 14	Miami Dolphins	L 7–14	Los Angeles Memorial Coliseum	90,182	Recap

=== Game summaries ===
==== NFC Divisional Playoffs: vs. Green Bay Packers ====
NFC Divisional Playoffs: Green Bay Packers 3 at Washington Redskins 16 – Game summary

Quarter	1	2	3	4	Total
Packers (10–5)	0	3	0	0	3
Redskins (12–3)	0	10	0	6	16

at RFK Stadium, Washington, D.C.

- Date: December 24, 1972
- Game time: 12 Noon EST
- Game weather: 39 °F (4 °C); relative humidity 98%; wind 7 miles per hour (11 km/h; 6.1 kn) (Drizzle)
- Game attendance: 53,140
- Referee: Bernie Ulman
- TV announcers (CBS): Jack Buck (play-by-play), Tom Brookshier (color commentator) and Bruce Roberts (studio reporter)

Team	Category	Player	Statistics
GB	Passing	Scott Hunter	12/24, 150 YDS, 1 TD
GB	Rushing	MacArthur Lane	14 CAR, 56 YDS
GB	Receiving	MacArthur Lane	4 REC, 42 YDS
WAS	Passing	Billy Kilmer	7/14. 100 YDS, 1 TD
WAS	Rushing	Larry Brown	25 CAR, 101 YDS
WAS	Receiving	Roy Jefferson	5 REC, 84 YDS, 1 TD

Scoring summary

Quarter	Time	Drive			Team	Scoring information	Score	
Quarter	Time	Plays	Yards	TOP	Team	Scoring information	GB	WAS
2					Packers	17-yard field goal by Marcol	3	0
2					Redskins	Jefferson 32-yard touchdown reception from Kilmer, Knight kick good	3	7
2					Redskins	42-yard field goal by Knight	3	10
4					Redskins	35-yard field goal by Knight	3	13
4					Redskins	46-yard field goal by Knight	3	16
"TOP" = time of possession. For other American football terms, see Glossary of American football.							3	16

==== NFC Championship Game: vs. Dallas Cowboys ====
NFC Championship Game: Dallas Cowboys 3 at Washington Redskins 26 – Game summary

Quarter	1	2	3	4	Total
Cowboys (11–5)	0	3	0	0	3
Redskins (13–3)	0	10	0	16	26

at RFK Stadium, Washington, D.C.

- Date: December 31, 1972
- Game time: 3:00 p.m. EST
- Game weather: 49 °F (9 °C); relative humidity 99%; wind 8 miles per hour (13 km/h; 7.0 kn) (Overcast)
- Game attendance: 53,129
- Referee: Jim Tunney
- TV announcers (CBS): Jack Buck (play-by-play), Pat Summerall (color commentator) and Bruce Roberts (studio reporter)

Team	Category	Player	Statistics
DAL	Passing	Roger Staubach	9/20, 98 YDS
DAL	Rushing	Roger Staubach	5 CAR, 59 YDS
DAL	Receiving	Ron Sellers	2 REC, 29 YDS
WAS	Passing	Billy Kilmer	14/18, 194 YDS, 2 TDs
WAS	Rushing	Larry Brown	30 CAR, 88 YDS
WAS	Receiving	Charley Taylor	7 REC, 146 YDS, 2 TDs

Scoring summary

Quarter	Time	Drive			Team	Scoring information	Score	
Quarter	Time	Plays	Yards	TOP	Team	Scoring information	DAL	WAS
2					Redskins	18-yard field goal by Knight	0	3
2					Redskins	Taylor 15-yard touchdown reception from Kilmer, Knight kick good	0	10
2					Cowboys	35-yard field goal by Fritsch	3	10
4					Redskins	Taylor 45-yard touchdown reception from Kilmer, Knight kick good	3	17
4					Redskins	39-yard field goal by Knight	3	20
4					Redskins	46-yard field goal by Knight	3	23
4					Redskins	45-yard field goal by Knight	3	26
"TOP" = time of possession. For other American football terms, see Glossary of American football.							3	26

==== Super Bowl VII: vs. Miami Dolphins ====
Super Bowl VII: Miami Dolphins 14 vs. Washington Redskins 7 – Game summary

Quarter	1	2	3	4	Total
Dolphins (17–0)	7	7	0	0	14
Redskins (13–4)	0	0	0	7	7

at Los Angeles Memorial Coliseum, Los Angeles, California

- Date: January 14, 1973
- Game time: 3:49 p.m. EST
- Game weather: 84 °F (29 °C); relative humidity 53%; wind 9 miles per hour (14 km/h; 7.8 kn) (sunny, hazy)
- Game attendance: 90,182 (paid); 81,706 (actual)
- Referee: Tom Bell
- TV announcers (NBC): Curt Gowdy (play-by-play), Al DeRogatis (color commentator) and Bill Enis (sideline reporter)

Team	Category	Player	Statistics
MIA	Passing	Bob Griese	8/11, 88 YDS, 1 TD, 1 INT
MIA	Rushing	Larry Csonka	15 CAR, 112 YDS
MIA	Receiving	Paul Warfield	3 REC, 36 YDS
WAS	Passing	Billy Kilmer	14/28, 104 YDS, 3 INTs
WAS	Rushing	Larry Brown	22 CAR, 72 YDS
WAS	Receiving	Roy Jefferson	5 REC, 50 YDS

Scoring summary

Quarter	Time	Drive			Team	Scoring information	Score	
Quarter	Time	Plays	Yards	TOP	Team	Scoring information	MIA	WAS
1	0:01	6	63	2:54	Dolphins	Twilley 28-yard touchdown reception from Griese, Yepremian kick good	7	0
2	0:18	5	27	1:33	Dolphins	Kiick 1-yard touchdown run, Yepremian kick good	14	0
4	2:07		—	—	Redskins	Fumble recovery returned 49 yards for touchdown by Bass, Knight kick good	14	7
"TOP" = time of possession. For other American football terms, see Glossary of American football.							14	7

== Awards and records ==
- Larry Brown, NFL MVP
- Larry Brown, Bert Bell Award
- Larry Brown, AP NFL Offensive Player of the Year
- Billy Kilmer, NFL leader (tied) in touchdown passes (19). NFL leader in passer rating (84.8).
