= 1969 Washington Redskins season =

NFL team season

- Owner: Edward Bennett Williams
- General manager: Vince Lombardi
- President: Edward Bennett Williams
- Head coach: Vince Lombardi
- Home stadium: RFK Stadium

Results
- Record: 7–5–2
- Division place: 2nd NFL Capitol
- Playoffs: Did not qualify

The 1969 Washington Redskins season was the franchise's 38th season in the National Football League (NFL) and their 33rd in Washington, D.C. In his only season with the franchise, the Redskins were led by head coach and general manager Vince Lombardi. The team improved on their 5–9 record from 1968 to finish at 7–5–2, their first winning season in 14 years. This was the final season to feature the lance logo on the helmet, and home games were played at RFK Stadium (formerly D.C. Stadium).

== Offseason ==
During the week preceding Super Bowl III in January, rumors had circulated that Vince Lombardi had job offers from the Philadelphia Eagles, Boston Patriots, and Washington Redskins. The night before the Super Bowl, Lombardi met with Redskins president Edward Bennett Williams for dinner at Tony Sweet's restaurant. He agreed to coach the Redskins after Williams offered him complete authority over all personnel and football operations, the position of "Executive Vice President", and a 5% ownership stake. Following the death of founding owner George Preston Marshall in August, Williams became the majority owner.

=== NFL draft ===
1969 Washington Redskins draft
Round	Selection	Player	Position	College
2	46	Eugene Epps	Defensive back	Texas-El Paso
3	62	Ed Cross	Running back	Pine Bluff
5	114	Bill Kishman	Defensive back	Colorado State
6	139	Harold McLinton	Linebacker	Southern
7	166	Jeff Anderson	Running back	Virginia
7	173	John Didion	Center	Oregon State
8	191	Larry Brown	Running back	Kansas State
11	269	Eric Norri	Defensive tackle	Notre Dame
12	295	Bob Shannon	Defensive back	Tennessee State
13	322	Michael Shook	Defensive back	North Texas
14	347	Rick Brand	Defensive tackle	Virginia
15	374	Paul Rogers	Tackle	Virginia
16	399	Mike Washington	Linebacker	Southern
17	426	Rich Dobbert	Defensive end	Springfield (Massachusetts)

=== Vince Lombardi ===
After stepping down as head coach of the Packers following the 1967 NFL season, a restless Lombardi returned to coaching in 1969 with the Washington Redskins, where he broke a string of 14 losing seasons. The 'Skins would finish with a record of 7–5–2, significant for a number of reasons. Lombardi discovered that rookie running back Larry Brown was deaf in one ear, something that had escaped his parents, schoolteachers, and previous coaches. Lombardi had observed Brown's habit of tilting his head in one direction when listening to signals being called, and walked behind him during drills and said "Larry." When Brown did not answer, the coach asked him to take a hearing exam. Brown was fitted with a hearing aid, and with this correction he would enjoy a successful NFL career.

Lombardi was the first coach to get quarterback Sonny Jurgensen, one of the league's premier passers but notoriously lax on fitness, into the best condition he could. Sam Huff came out of retirement exclusively to play for Lombardi. He even changed the team's uniform design to reflect that of the Packers, with gold and white trim along the jersey biceps, and later a gold helmet. The foundation Lombardi laid was the groundwork for Washington's early 1970s success under former Los Angeles Rams Coach George Allen. Lombardi had brought a winning attitude to the Nation's Capital, in the same year that the nearby University of Maryland had hired "Lefty" Driesell to coach basketball and the hapless Washington Senators named Ted Williams as manager. It marked a renaissance in sports interest in the Nation's capitol.

Lombardi lasted only one season with the Redskins; he was diagnosed with terminal cancer after the 1969 season and died shortly before the 1970 regular season was to start.

== Roster ==
1969 Washington Redskins roster
Quarterbacks (QB): 9 Sonny Jurgensen; 13 Frank Ryan; 16 Gary Beban; Running backs (RB): 20 Gerry Allen; 43 Larry Brown; 32 Henry Dyer; 31 Charley Harraway; 40 David Kopay; Wide receivers (WR): 16 Gary Beban; 84 Marshall Cropper ×; 80 Bob Long; 47 Walter Roberts; 42 Charley Taylor; Tight ends (TE): 88 Pat Richter; 87 Jerry Smith	Offensive linemen (OL): 68 Willie Banks G; 51 John Didion C; 63 Steve Duich G; 67 Dan Grimm G; 56 Len Hauss C; 65 Vince Promuto G; 76 Walt Rock T; 62 Ray Schoenke G; 74 Jim Snowden T; Defensive linemen (DL): 73 Frank Bosch DT; 89 Leo Carroll DE; 79 Dennis Crane DT; 85 John Hoffman DE; 66 Carl Kammerer DE; 60 Dick LeMay DE ×; 82 Clark Miller DE; 71 Spain Musgrove DT; 83 Jim Norton DT	Linebackers (LB): 55 Chris Hanburger OLB; 70 Sam Huff MLB; 86 Marlin McKeever MLB; 53 Harold McLinton OLB; 54 Tom Roussel OLB; Defensive backs (DB): 41 Mike Bass CB; 21 Tom Brown SS; 46 Rickie Harris FS; 37 Pat Fischer CB; 23 Brig Owens SS; 29 Ted Vactor CB; 24 Bob Wade SS; Special teams (ST): 4 Mike Bragg P; 3 Charlie Gogolak K ×; 5 Curt Knight K	Reserve: 26 Bob Brunet RB (IR); 34 Bill Kishman S (IR); 27 John Love WR (Military); 72 Joe Rutgens DT (IR); × Taxi Squad only Rookies in italics

== Preseason ==
Week	Date	Opponent	Result	Record	Venue	Attendance
1	August 2	Chicago Bears	W 13–7	1–0	RFK Stadium	45,988
2	August 8	at Buffalo Bills (AFL)	L 17–21	1–1	War Memorial Stadium	37,012
3	August 23	at Atlanta Falcons	W 24–7	2–1	Atlanta Stadium	56,990
4	August 30	vs. Detroit Lions	L 20–21	2–2	Tampa Stadium (Tampa, FL)	42,477
5	September 6	Cleveland Browns	L 10–20	2–3	RFK Stadium	45,994
6	September 14	at Philadelphia Eagles	L 17–26	2–4	Franklin Field	35,417

== Regular season ==
=== Schedule ===
Week	Date	Opponent	Result	Record	Venue	Attendance	Recap
1	September 21	at **New Orleans Saints**	**W** 26–20	1–0	Tulane Stadium	73,147	Recap
2	September 28	at Cleveland Browns	**L** 23–27	1–1	Cleveland Municipal Stadium	82,581	Recap
3	October 5	at San Francisco 49ers	**T** 17–17	1–1–1	Kezar Stadium	35,642	Recap
4	October 12	St. Louis Cardinals	**W** 33–17	2–1–1	RFK Stadium	50,481	Recap
5	October 19	New York Giants	**W** 20–14	3–1–1	RFK Stadium	50,352	Recap
6	October 26	at Pittsburgh Steelers	**W** 14–7	4–1–1	Pitt Stadium	46,557	Recap
7	November 2	at Baltimore Colts	**L** 17–41	4–2–1	Memorial Stadium	60,238	Recap
8	November 9	**Philadelphia Eagles**	**T** 28–28	4–2–2	RFK Stadium	50,502	Recap
9	November 16	**Dallas Cowboys**	**L** 28–41	4–3–2	RFK Stadium	50,474	Recap
10	November 23	Atlanta Falcons	**W** 27–20	5–3–2	RFK Stadium	50,345	Recap
11	November 30	Los Angeles Rams	**L** 13–24	5–4–2	RFK Stadium	50,352	Recap
12	December 7	at **Philadelphia Eagles**	**W** 34–29	6–4–2	Franklin Field	60,658	Recap
13	December 14	**New Orleans Saints**	**W** 17–14	7–4–2	RFK Stadium	50,354	Recap
14	December 21	at **Dallas Cowboys**	**L** 10–20	7–5–2	Cotton Bowl	56,924	Recap
Note: Intra-division opponents are in **bold** text.

=== Season summary ===
==== Week 9 vs Cowboys ====
Week Nine: Dallas Cowboys (7–1) at Washington Redskins (4–2–2)

Quarter	1	2	3	4	Total
**Cowboys**	17	10	7	7	**41**
Redskins	7	14	7	0	**28**

at Robert F. Kennedy Memorial Stadium, Washington, D.C.

- Date: November 16, 1969
- Game weather: 33 °F (1 °C)
- Game attendance: 50,474
- Box Score

Game information

**First quarter**

- DAL – Mike Clark 36-yard field goal. Cowboys 3–0.
- WSH – Jerry Smith 27-yard pass from Sonny Jurgensen (Curt Knight kick). Redskins 7–3.
- DAL – Lance Rentzel 65-yard pass from Craig Morton (Mike Clark kick). Cowboys 10–7.
- DAL – Larry Cole 41-yard interception return (Mike Clark kick). Cowboys 17–7.

**Second quarter**

- DAL – Calvin Hill 3-yard run (Mike Clark kick). Cowboys 24–7.
- WSH – Charley Taylor 68-yard pass from Sonny Jurgensen (Curt Knight kick). Cowboys 24–14.
- DAL – Mike Clark 14-yard field goal. Cowboys 27–14.
- WSH – Jerry Smith 11-yard pass from Sonny Jurgensen (Curt Knight kick). Cowboys 27–21.

**Third quarter**

- DAL – Calvin Hill 7-yard run (Mike Clark kick). Cowboys 34–21.
- WSH – Jerry Smith 20-yard pass from Sonny Jurgensen (Curt Knight kick). Cowboys 34–28.

**Fourth quarter**

- DAL – Dan Reeves 4-yard run (Mike Clark kick). Cowboys 41–28.

Top passers

- DAL – Craig Morton – 8/17, 156 yards, TD, INT
- WSH – Sonny Jurgensen – 24/35, 338 yards, 4 TD, 4 INT

Top rushers

- DAL – Calvin Hill – 27 rushes, 150 yards, 2 TD
- WSH – Larry Brown – 11 rushes, 38 yards

Top receivers

- DAL – Lance Rentzel – 2 receptions, 84 yards, TD
- WSH – Charley Taylor – 6 receptions, 155 yards, TD

- President Richard Nixon was in attendance.

==== Week 12 ====
Team	1	2	3	4	Total
• Redskins	7	6	14	7	34
Eagles	7	9	3	10	29

- Date: December 7
- Location: Franklin Field
- Game attendance: 60,658
- Game weather: Sleet; 32 °F (0 °C); wind 10 mph

Scoring summary
Q1	PHI	Keyes 2 yard run (Baker kick)	PHI 7–0
Q1	WSH	Taylor 12 yard pass from Jurgensen (Knight kick)	Tie 7–7
Q2	PHI	Jackson 29 yard pass from Snead (Baker kick)	PHI 14–7
Q2	PHI	Safety, Jurgensen tackled in end zone by Tom	PHI 16–7
Q2	WSH	Knight 12 yard field goal	PHI 16–10
Q2	WSH	Knight 43 yard field goal	PHI 16–13
Q3	PHI	Baker 47 yard field goal	PHI 19–13
Q3	WSH	Hoffman recovered fumble in end zone (Knight kick)	WSH 20–19
Q3	WSH	Smith 25 yard pass from Jurgensen (Knight kick)	WSH 27–19
Q4	PHI	Baker 19 yard field goal	WSH 27–22
Q4	WSH	Brown 1 yard run (Knight kick)	WSH 34–22
Q4	PHI	Jackson 10 yard pass from Snead (Baker kick)	WSH 34–29

- Larry Brown 19 Rush, 138 Yds

=== Standings ===
NFL Capitol
	W	L	T	PCT	DIV	CONF	PF	PA	STK
Dallas Cowboys	11	2	1	.846	6–0	9–1	369	223	W3
Washington Redskins	7	5	2	.583	3–2–1	6–3–1	307	319	L1
New Orleans Saints	5	9	0	.357	1–5	4–6	311	393	W1
Philadelphia Eagles	4	9	1	.308	1–4–1	4–5–1	279	377	L4

Note: Tie games were not officially counted in the standings until 1972.
