= Herb Mul-Key =

American gridiron football player (born 1949)

- Mul-Key in 1975

No. 28
- Positions: Running back, kick returner

Personal information
- Born: November 15, 1949 (age 76); Atlanta, Georgia, U.S.
- Listed height: 6 ft 0 in (1.83 m)
- Listed weight: 190 lb (86 kg)

Career information
- College: Alabama State
- NFL draft: 1972: undrafted

Career history
- Washington Redskins (1972–1974); Baltimore Colts (1975)*; Montreal Alouettes (1975)
- * Offseason or practice squad member only

Awards and highlights
- Pro Bowl (1973)

Career NFL statistics
- Games played: 23
- Starts: 1
- Kick return yards: 1,505
- Rushing yards: 178
- Touchdowns: 2
- Stats at Pro Football Reference

Herbert Felton Mul-Key (born November 15, 1949) is an American former professional football player who was a running back for three seasons with the Washington Redskins in the National Football League (NFL). He was a member of their Super Bowl VII squad, and appeared in the Pro Bowl in 1973. Born Herbert Mulkey, he hyphenated his name after having it made fun of in school.

== Biography ==
Herb Mul-Key attended Harper High School in Atlanta, where he was an all-city player. However, his attitude was criticized by coaches, and he did not receive a college scholarship. Yet, he was able to play at Alabama State College but for only one season. After that he worked a series of jobs and served in the Navy. Childhood friend Harold McLinton told Mul-Key of an open try-out for the Redskins. Mul-Key borrowed money from his parents and friends to travel to Washington, D.C. to attend the tryout held by George Allen and the Redskins in 1971. Allen was impressed by his speed, running 40 yards in under 4.5 seconds on a wet field, and signed him to the rookie minimum salary of $12,000. He was the only player ever signed from these tryouts, which were more public relations stunts than an actual talent search.

Mul-Key spent most of the 1972 on Washington's reserve list. He was activated for the 13th game of the season against the Dallas Cowboys when NFC rushing leader Larry Brown was injured. In that game he rushed for 60 yards on 8 attempts and returned 6 kickoffs for 173 yards. He started the next game, the final game of the 1972 regular season, against the Buffalo Bills and rushed for 95 yards on 25 carries. In the 1972 playoffs he served as a kick returner, returning 2 kickoffs for 60 yards in the divisional round game against the Green Bay Packers and returning 1 kickoff for 15 yards in Super Bowl VII against the Miami Dolphins.

In pre-season in 1973 Mul-Key ran the first kickoff at Rich Stadium back 102 yards for a touchdown. In a game against the St. Louis Cardinals on September 23, 1973, Mul-Key scored on a 97 yard kickoff return on the play after Don Shy had scored a kickoff return touchdown; the 2nd time in NFL history kickoff return touchdowns were scored on consecutive plays. He went to the Pro Bowl after the 1973 season as a kick returner. In 1974 Mul-Key separated his shoulder in Washington's 5th game against Miami and he required surgery to repair it and was placed on injured reserve.

Mul-Key was traded to the Baltimore Colts before the 1975 season in exchange for a 1977 4th round draft pick. The Colts cut Mul-Key before the 1975 season and he was signed by the Montreal Alouettes of the Canadian Football League. Mul-Key was cut by the Alouettes before the 1976 season.
