= Charley Harraway =

American football player (born 1944)

No. 31
- Position: Running back

Personal information
- Born: September 21, 1944 (age 82); Oklahoma City, Oklahoma, U.S.
- Listed height: 6 ft 2 in (1.88 m)
- Listed weight: 215 lb (98 kg)

Career information
- High school: Monterey (Monterey, California)
- College: San Jose State
- NFL draft: 1966: 18th round, 273rd overall pick
- AFL draft: 1966: 14th round, 124th overall pick

Career history
- Cleveland Browns (1966–1968); Washington Redskins (1969–1973); Birmingham Americans (1974)

Career NFL statistics
- Rushing yards: 3,019
- Rushing average: 3.7
- Receptions: 158
- Receiving yards: 1,304
- Total touchdowns: 27
- Stats at Pro Football Reference

Charles Edward Harraway, Jr. (born September 21, 1944) is an American former professional football player who was a running back for eight seasons with the Cleveland Browns and Washington Redskins of the National Football League (NFL). He also played one season in the World Football League, with the champion Birmingham Americans in 1974. He played college football for the San Jose State Spartans.

== Early life ==
Born in Oklahoma City, Oklahoma, Harraway's father was in the U.S. Army and he attended the American high school in Baumholder, West Germany, and graduated from Monterey High School in California in 1962.

He played college football nearby at San Jose State University under head coaches Bob Titchenal and Harry Anderson and is a member of the Spartans' hall of fame.

== Playing career ==
=== NFL ===
Harraway was selected in the 18th round of the 1966 NFL draft by the Cleveland Browns, the 273rd overall pick. He was also taken in the 14th round of the AFL draft by the Kansas City Chiefs.

He signed with the NFL and played three seasons in Cleveland under head coach Blanton Collier; the Browns won the Century Division in 1967 and 1968 and went to the playoffs. Harraway was the Browns' second-leading rusher in 1968, but he was waived in September 1969 and claimed by the Redskins, by Vince Lombardi in his only season as Washington head coach.

Harraway was paired in the backfield with Larry Brown, and the Redskins made the playoffs three consecutive seasons starting in 1971 under head coach George Allen, including the NFC title in 1972 and a berth in Super Bowl VII.

=== WFL ===
Harraway played out his option in Washington in 1973 and signed for a significant salary increase with the Birmingham Americans of the World Football League in 1974, one of the few NFL starters to jump in the league's first season. The Americans won the first World Bowl by a point in early December, but were less successful financially and folded in March 1975.

His NFL rights were traded by Washington to the Miami Dolphins for veteran tight end Marv Fleming in 1975; Harraway did not report, Fleming was waived in September, and both retired.

== NFL career statistics ==
Legend
**Bold**	Career high

=== Regular season ===
Year	Team	Games		Rushing					Receiving				
Year	Team	GP	GS	Att	Yds	Avg	Lng	TD	Rec	Yds	Avg	Lng	TD
1966	CLE	14	0	7	40	**5.7**	18	0	0	0	0.0	0	0
1967	CLE	14	0	5	-14	-2.8	2	0	0	0	0.0	0	0
1968	CLE	13	5	91	334	3.7	23	0	12	162	**13.5**	63	1
1969	WAS	14	13	141	428	3.0	17	**6**	**55**	**489**	8.9	**64**	**3**
1970	WAS	13	13	146	577	4.0	**57**	5	24	136	5.7	29	0
1971	WAS	14	14	**156**	**635**	4.1	**57**	2	20	121	6.1	20	0
1972	WAS	14	14	148	567	3.8	24	**6**	15	105	7.0	24	0
1973	WAS	14	14	128	452	3.5	16	1	32	291	9.1	31	**3**
		110	73	822	3,019	3.7	57	20	158	1,304	8.3	64	7

=== Playoffs ===
Year	Team	Games		Rushing					Receiving				
Year	Team	GP	GS	Att	Yds	Avg	Lng	TD	Rec	Yds	Avg	Lng	TD
1967	CLE	1	0	0	0	0.0	0	0	0	0	0.0	0	0
1968	CLE	2	2	11	38	**3.5**	8	0	**5**	**38**	**7.6**	**16**	0
1971	WAS	1	1	10	28	2.8	7	0	1	4	4.0	4	0
1972	WAS	3	3	**31**	**90**	2.9	**9**	0	4	10	2.5	7	0
1973	WAS	1	1	13	40	3.1	**9**	0	1	6	6.0	6	0
		8	7	65	196	3.0	9	0	11	58	5.3	16	0

== After football ==
In 2012, Harraway resided in Sarasota, Florida, and showed early signs of Alzheimer's disease.

== Video ==
- You Tube - Harraway highlight film - NFL Films
