= Gogolak =

Gogolak is a surname. Notable people with the surname include:

- Charlie Gogolak (born 1944), American football player
- Pete Gogolak (born 1942), American football player
