= Larry Brown (running back) =

American football player (born 1947)

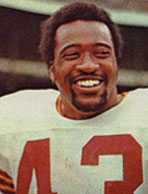
- Brown in 1973

No. 43
- Position: Running back

Personal information
- Born: September 19, 1947 (age 79); Clairton, Pennsylvania, U.S.
- Listed height: 5 ft 11 in (1.80 m)
- Listed weight: 195 lb (88 kg)

Career information
- High school: Pittsburgh (PA) Schenley
- College: Dodge City (KS); Kansas State
- NFL draft: 1969: 8th round, 191st overall pick

Career history
- Washington Redskins (1969–1976)

Awards and highlights
- NFL Most Valuable Player (1972); NFL Offensive Player of the Year (1972); UPI NFC Player of the Year (1972); 2× First-team All-Pro (1970, 1972); Second-team All-Pro (1971); 4× Pro Bowl (1969–1972); NFL rushing yards leader (1970); 80 Greatest Redskins; Washington Commanders Ring of Fame; Washington DC Sports Hall of Fame

Career NFL statistics
- Rushing yards: 5,875
- Rushing average: 3.8
- Receptions: 238
- Receiving yards: 2,485
- Total touchdowns: 55
- Stats at Pro Football Reference

Lawrence Brown Jr. (born September 19, 1947) is an American former professional football player in the National Football League (NFL) who played running back for the Washington Redskins from 1969 to 1976.

== Early life ==
Brown was born on September 19, 1947, in Clairton, Pennsylvania, to Rosa Lee and Lawrence Brown Sr. He was deaf in his right ear from birth. Brown was raised in the Hill District of Pittsburgh, Pennsylvania, a tough neighborhood, and graduated from Schenley High School. During his high school football playing years, there would be fights in the stands when predominantly black schools played predominantly white schools. While Brown himself avoided fighting in football or in his neighborhood, he did grow up to be tough and determined. Brown's original interest was baseball, but he developed an overriding interest in football during his junior year in high school.

== College football ==
Brown played college football in Kansas at Dodge City Community College (1965–66) and then Kansas State University in Manhattan (1967–68). He was offered a scholarship at Dodge City, but only if he tried out for and made the football team.

He was a blocking back at Dodge City. During his sophomore year at Dodge City, he earned All-KJCCC (Kansas Jayhawk Community College Conference) first team honors, along with National Junior College Athletic Association (NJCAA) honorable mention All-American honors. In 1972, Brown was selected a Dodge City Community College's Distinguished Alumnus, and in 1986 was inducted into its Hall of Fame. Brown was in the inaugural 2021 class of the NJCAA Foundation Hall of Fame.

In 1967, he was recruited to Kansas State as a blocking back, and in his first year he only had 50 rushing attempts. Brown averaged 5.6 yards per carry, and over 600 total rushing and receiving yards in 1967. In 1968, he became the team's running back and led Kansas State with 402 rushing yards on 111 attempts, to go along with 13 receptions.

== Professional career ==
Brown's eight-year professional career was spent exclusively with the Washington Redskins.

Brown was recruited to Washington by future Pro Football Hall of Fame coaching legend Vince Lombardi, who coached Washington in the 1969 season (his only season there before dying of cancer in September 1970). Brown was selected in the eighth round with the 191st overall pick in the 1969 NFL/AFL draft in January 1969. He was seventh of 14 players Washington picked in the draft that year. (The team had selected him as an afterthought.)

Washington was primarily a passing team, starring All-Pro quarterback and future Hall of Famer Sonny Jurgensen. In 1967 they had the NFL's first ( future Hall of Famer receiver Charley Taylor), second (tight end Jerry Smith) and fourth (future Hall of Fame runner and receiver Bobby Mitchell) ranked receivers in passes caught, but they needed a productive rusher. Washington was first in the league in passing yards (3,730) that year, but second-to-last in rushing yards (1,247). In 1968, Jurgensen suffered broken ribs and had elbow surgery, played in only 12 games, and fell from a league-leading 3,747 passing yards in 1967, to 1,980 yards in 1968 (though Washington still had the fifth-most passing yards that year). The team fell to last in the league in rushing with 1,164 yards (3.2 yards per carry).

Brown was an unlikely candidate, having served as a blocking back for Cornelius Davis at Kansas State in 1967, though Brown had more carries and yards than Davis in 1968; and where sophomore quarterback Lynn Dickey led the Big-Eight Conference in passing in 1968, and would go on to break all school passing records. Brown had not been widely recruited in high school. His strongest feeler came from Howard University in Washington, D.C., but upon visiting its campus, he noted the lopsided football scores against the university's teams posted on past schedules in the school's athletic building.

In 1969, newly-arrived Redskins head coach Vince Lombardi noticed Brown, a talented but underperforming running back. He made the 5 ft 11 in (1.80 m), 195-pound (88 kg) rookie his starter, but noticed Brown was starting slightly late behind the snap of the ball. Tests ordered by Lombardi determined that Brown was hearing-impaired in one ear, and that he was watching for the lineman to move rather than listening to the quarterback's snap count.

After getting approval from the league Commissioner's office, Lombardi had Brown's helmet fitted with an ear-piece that relayed quarterback Sonny Jurgensen's snap counts, improving Brown's responsiveness, thus allowing him to hit the hole very quickly. Brown's other rookie obstacle was his training camp propensity to fumble. Lombardi ordered Brown to carry a football everywhere he went at the team's training camp in Carlisle, Pennsylvania.

Brown had an impressive rookie season during which he was largely the reason Washington posted a record of 7–5–2, their first winning record since 1955. He had rushed for 888 yards, a team record. He was second in the Associated Press (AP) voting for NFL Offensive Rookie of the Year (behind Calvin Hill), and third in the United Press International (UPI) voting (behind Hill and Joe Greene). Brown was also selected to the Pro Bowl as a rookie.

Lombardi died of cancer during the preseason of Brown's second year, 1970. Lombardi was his greatest inspiration. Brown gained a league-leading 1,125 yards running that year (4.7 yards per carry) and caught 37 passes for 341 yards and scored seven touchdowns. It was the first 1,000 yard rushing season in team history. He was selected first team All-Pro by the AP, UPI, the Newspaper Enterprise Association (NEA), Pro Football Writers (FW), and Pro Football Weekly (PFW).

Brown went to four consecutive Pro Bowls during his first four seasons and led the Redskins to their Super Bowl VII appearance against the "perfect season" Miami Dolphins in January 1973. Brown was the National Football League's Most Valuable Player in 1972. He led the NFL in rushing (1,216 yards) despite missing two games with injuries. In 1972, he was also selected first team All-Pro by the AP, the NEA, FW and PFW. By contrast with the pre-Brown years, Washington had a balanced offense with 2,193 passing yards and 2,082 rushing yards.

Brown carried the ball 1,530 times in his career gaining 5,875 yards. His best seasons were in 1972 when he gained 1,216 yards and in 1970 when he gained 1,125 yards. At the time he retired, only Hall famers Jim Brown and O.J. Simpson had reached 5,000 rushing yards as quickly in their careers. He rushed for 100 yards or more 21 times and rushed for 100 yards or more in six games in 1970 and six games in 1972. He also scored four rushing touchdowns in one game against the Eagles on December 16, 1973. On October 29, 1972, he ran for 191 yards in a game against the New York Giants.

Brown was also a capable receiver, with 238 receptions for 2,485 yards over his eight years. He had 20 receiving touchdowns, to go along with his 35 rushing touchdowns. While his longest run was 75 yards, his longest pass reception was for 89 yards. He had a total of 8,360 yards from scrimmage during his regular season career, averaging 4.7 yards per touch, and 1,045 yards per year (at a time when there were only 14 games in a season).

In 1973, Brown co-authored an autobiography entitled "I'll Always Get Up".

Brown's career was cut short due to numerous injuries, and his jersey number, 43, while not officially retired, has not been issued to any other Washington player since his retirement, except to Nate Orchard for two games in 2021.

== Legacy ==
He was noted for his tough running style despite his relatively small size, which he attributed to having been raised on the tough streets of Pittsburgh's Hill District, and playing tackle football in those streets. He was also noted for his abilities to break tackles, and gain yardage after contact, which announcers called "second effort". When rookie Pittsburgh Steeler, and future Hall of Fame, running back Franco Harris first saw Brown play in 1972, he was deeply impressed by Brown's intensity and desire on every play. This changed Harris's understanding of how he himself would have to play in the NFL.

He finished in the top five of the league for rushes five times, rushing yards four times, yards from scrimmage three times and total touchdowns twice. Brown was the first Redskins running back to gain more than 1,000 yards in a single season. He achieved that feat twice in a career that ran from 1969 to 1976. In an eight-year career, Brown was selected to play in the Pro Bowl in 1969, 1970, 1971, and 1972. He has been voted one of the 70 and 80 Greatest Redskins of All Time. He was selected as the DC Touchdown Club NFL Player of the Year in 1972. He is a member of the Washington Commanders Ring of Fame.

The Professional Football Researchers Association named Brown to the PFRA Hall of Very Good Class of 2014.

== NFL career statistics ==
Legend
| | NFL MVP |
| | Led the league |
| **Bold** | Career high |

| Year | Team | Games | | Rushing | | | | | | Receiving | | | | | Fumbles | |
| Year | Team | GP | GS | Att | Yds | Avg | Y/G | Lng | TD | Rec | Yds | Avg | Lng | TD | Fum | FR |
|---|---|---|---|---|---|---|---|---|---|---|---|---|---|---|---|---|
| 1969 | WAS | **14** | 13 | 202 | 888 | 4.4 | 63.4 | 57 | 4 | 34 | 302 | 8.9 | 31 | 0 | 6 | 2 |
| 1970 | WAS | 13 | 13 | 237 | 1,125 | **4.7** | 86.5 | **75** | 5 | 37 | 341 | 9.2 | 66 | 2 | 6 | 1 |
| 1971 | WAS | 13 | 13 | 253 | 948 | 3.7 | 72.9 | 34 | 4 | 16 | 176 | 11.0 | 36 | 2 | 6 | 0 |
| 1972 | WAS | 12 | 12 | **285** | **1,216** | 4.3 | **101.3** | 38 | **8** | 32 | 473 | **14.8** | **89** | 4 | **9** | **3** |
| 1973 | WAS | **14** | **14** | 273 | 860 | 3.2 | 61.4 | 27 | **8** | **40** | **482** | 12.1 | 64 | **6** | 7 | 2 |
| 1974 | WAS | 11 | 11 | 163 | 430 | 2.6 | 39.1 | 16 | 3 | 37 | 388 | 10.5 | 34 | 4 | 2 | 0 |
| 1975 | WAS | **14** | 8 | 97 | 352 | 3.6 | 25.1 | 43 | 3 | 25 | 225 | 9.0 | 39 | 2 | 2 | 0 |
| 1976 | WAS | 11 | 0 | 20 | 56 | 2.8 | 5.1 | 11 | 0 | 17 | 98 | 5.8 | 15 | 0 | 2 | 0 |
| Career | | 102 | 84 | 1,530 | 5,875 | 3.8 | 57.6 | 75 | 35 | 238 | 2,485 | 10.4 | 89 | 20 | 40 | 8 |

== Post-football career ==
Brown is currently a Vice President of NAI Michael Commercial Real Estate Services. After retiring from football in 1976, he was employed at E.F. Hutton as a Personal Financial Management Advisor.

For 12 years, Brown was employed by Xerox Corporation with responsibilities for business and community relations.

He has served on the Board of Directors of Mellon Bank (MD); the Board of Visitors of George Mason University; the Board of Directors of the Greater Washington, D.C. Sports Authority; and a Delegate to Japan with the American Council of Young Political Leaders.

== Charitable activities ==
Brown has been active over many years in charitable activities for the Redskins and other non-profit organizations in the Washington, D.C. area, including the Prince George's County Special Olympics, the National Council on Disability, Friends of the National Zoo Advisory Committee, the Coalition for the Homeless, the Capital Children's Museum, and the Washington Redskins Charity Golf Classic.

He makes regular appearances at Redskins alumni events.
