= 1971 All-Pro Team =

Official list of the best NFL players in 1971

The following is a list of players that were named to the Associated Press All-Pro Team, the Newspaper Enterprise Association All-Pro team and the Pro Football Writers Association, and Pro Football Weekly All-Pro teams in 1971. Both first- and second- teams are listed for the NEA, and PFWA teams. These are the four All-Pro teams that are included in the Total Football II: The Official Encyclopedia of the National Football League and compose the Consensus All-pro team for 1971.

== Teams ==
Offense
Position	First team	Second team
Quarterback	Bob Griese, Miami Dolphins (AP, NEA, PFWA, PFW)	Roger Staubach, Dallas Cowboys (NEA-2, PFWA-2)
Running back	John Brockington, Green Bay Packers (AP, NEA, PFWA, PFW); Larry Csonka, Miami Dolphins (AP, PFWA); Leroy Kelly, Cleveland Browns (NEA); Floyd Little, Denver Broncos (PFW)	Larry Brown, Washington Redskins (NEA-2); Larry Csonka, Miami Dolphins (NEA-2); Leroy Kelly, Cleveland Browns (PFWA-2); Floyd Little, Denver Broncos (PFWA-2)
Wide receiver	Otis Taylor, Kansas City Chiefs (AP, NEA, PFWA, PFW); Paul Warfield, Miami Dolphins (AP, NEA, PFWA, PFW)	Fred Biletnikoff, Oakland Raiders (NEA-2, PFWA-2); Gene Washington, San Francisco 49ers (NEA-2, PFWA-2)
Tight end	Charlie Sanders, Detroit Lions (AP, NEA, PFWA, PFW)	Ted Kwalick, San Francisco 49ers (PFWA, PFW)
Tackle	Ron Yary, Minnesota Vikings (AP, NEA, PFWA, PFW); Rayfield Wright, Dallas Cowboys (AP, PFWA); Bob Brown, Oakland Raiders (NEA); Jim Tyrer, Kansas City Chiefs (PFW)	Winston Hill, New York Jets (NEA-2); Bob Brown, Oakland Raiders (PFWA-2; Jim Tyrer, Kansas City Chiefs (NEA-2, PFWA-2)
Guard	Larry Little, Miami Dolphins (AP, PFWA, PFW); John Niland, Dallas Cowboys (AP, PFWA, PFW); Tom Mack, Los Angeles Rams (NEA); Gale Gillingham, Green Bay Packers (NEA)	Gene Upshaw, Oakland Raiders (NEA-2); Walt Sweeney, San Diego Chargers (NEA-2); Tom Mack, Los Angeles Rams (PFWA-2); Gale Gillingham, Green Bay Packers (PFWA-2)
Center	Forrest Blue, San Francisco 49ers (AP, PFWA, PFW); Jim Otto, Oakland Raiders (NEA)	Bill Curry, Baltimore Colts (NEA-2, PFWA-2)

Special teams
Position	First team	Second team
Kicker	Garo Yepremian, Miami Dolphins (AP, PFWA-t); Jan Stenerud, Kansas City Chiefs (PFWA-t); Curt Knight, Washington Redskins (NEA)	Garo Yepremian, Miami Dolphins (NEA-2); Curt Knight, Washington Redskins (PFWA-2)
Punter	Jerrel Wilson, Kansas City Chiefs (PFWA)	Dave Lewis, Cincinnati Bengals (PFWA-2)

Defense
Position	First team	Second team
Defensive end	Carl Eller, Minnesota Vikings (AP, NEA, PFWA, PFW); Bubba Smith, Baltimore Colts (AP, PFWA, PFW); Claude Humphrey, Atlanta Falcons (NEA)	Coy Bacon, Los Angeles Rams (NEA-2); Cedrick Hardman, San Francisco 49ers (PFWA-2); Bubba Smith, Baltimore Colts (NEA-2); Claude Humphrey, Atlanta Falcons (PFWA-2)
Defensive tackle	Alan Page, Minnesota Vikings (AP, NEA, PFWA, PFW); Bob Lilly, Dallas Cowboys (AP, NEA, PFWA, PFW)	Joe Greene, Pittsburgh Steelers (NEA-2, PFWA-2); Buck Buchanan, Kansas City Chiefs (NEA-2); Curley Culp, Kansas City Chiefs (PFWA-2)
Middle linebacker	Willie Lanier, Kansas City Chiefs (AP, NEA, PFWA, PFW)	Dick Butkus, Chicago Bears (NEA-2, PFWA-2)
Outside linebacker	Ted Hendricks, Baltimore Colts (AP, NEA, PFWA, PFW); Dave Wilcox, San Francisco 49ers (AP, NEA, PFWA); Bobby Bell, Kansas City Chiefs (PFW)	Chuck Howley, Dallas Cowboys (PFWA-2); Isiah Robertson, Los Angeles Rams (NEA-2); Bobby Bell, Kansas City Chiefs (NEA-2, PFWA-2)
Cornerback	Jimmy Johnson, San Francisco 49ers (AP, NEA, PFWA, PFW); Willie Brown, Oakland Raiders (AP, PFWA, PFW); Mel Renfro, Dallas Cowboys (NEA)	Roger Wehrli, St. Louis Cardinals (NEA-2); Emmitt Thomas, Kansas City Chiefs (PFWA-2); Willie Brown, Oakland Raiders (NEA-2); Mel Renfro, Dallas Cowboys (PFWA-2)
Safety	Bill Bradley, Philadelphia Eagles (AP, PFWA, PFW); Rick Volk, Baltimore Colts (AP, NEA, PFWA); Paul Krause, Minnesota Vikings (NEA); Ken Houston, Houston Oilers (PFW)	Jake Scott, Miami Dolphins (NEA-2, PFWA-2); Ken Houston, Houston Oilers (NEA-2, PFWA-2)

== Key ==
- AP = Associated Press All-Pro team
- PFWA = Pro Football Writers Association All-Pro team
- NEA = Newspaper Enterprise Association All-Pro team
- NEA-2 Newspaper Enterprise Association Second-team All-Pro
- PFW = Pro Football Weekly All-Pro team
- t = players tied in votes.
