= Gene Hamlin =

American football player (1946–2017)

No. 50, 52, 58
- Position: Center

Personal information
- Born: July 26, 1946; Detroit, Michigan
- Died: August 24, 2017 (aged 71); Mount Clemens, Michigan
- Listed height: 6 ft 3 in (1.91 m)
- Listed weight: 245 lb (111 kg)

Career information
- High school: Redford Union High School
- College: Western Michigan
- NFL draft: 1969: undrafted

Career history
- Atlanta Falcons (1969)*; Washington Redskins (1970); Chicago Bears (1971); Detroit Lions (1972)
- * Offseason or practice squad member only

Career NFL statistics
- Games played: 16
- Stats at Pro Football Reference

Eugene Robert Hamlin (July 26, 1946 – August 24, 2017) was an American professional football center in the National Football League for the Washington Redskins, the Chicago Bears, and the Detroit Lions. He played in 16 total games overall with the three teams. He played college football at Western Michigan University.
