= Jimmy Harris (cornerback) =

American football player (born 1946)

No. 22, 26
- Position: Cornerback

Personal information
- Born: September 18, 1946 (age 80); Brownwood, Texas, U.S.

Career information
- College: Houston; Howard Payne
- NFL draft: 1970: 7th round, 178th overall pick

Career history
- 1970: Washington Redskins
- 1971: Cincinnati Bengals
- Stats at Pro Football Reference

James C. Harris (born September 18, 1946) is an American former professional football cornerback in the National Football League (NFL) for the Washington Redskins and Cincinnati Bengals. He played college football at Howard Payne University and was selected in the seventh round of the 1970 NFL draft.
