= Danny Pierce (American football) =

American football player (born 1948)

No. 19
- Position: Running back

Personal information
- Born: January 17, 1948 (age 78); Laurel, Mississippi, U.S.
- Listed height: 6 ft 3 in (1.91 m)
- Listed weight: 216 lb (98 kg)

Career information
- College: Mississippi State; Memphis
- NFL draft: 1970: 5th round, 121st overall pick

Career history
- Washington Redskins (1970)

Career NFL statistics
- Rushing attempts: 5
- Rushing yards: 6
- Receptions: 1
- Receiving yards: 6
- Stats at Pro Football Reference

John Daniel Pierce (born January 17, 1948) is an American former professional football player who was a running back for the Washington Redskins of the National Football League (NFL). He played college football for the Mississippi State Bulldogs and Memphis Tigers. He was selected 121st overall in the fifth round of the 1970 NFL draft.

Pierce appeared in two games during the 1970 NFL season, carrying five times for six yards and catching one pass for six yards.

Pierce was a quarterback for Memphis State.
