= Sonny Jurgensen =

American football player (1934–2026)

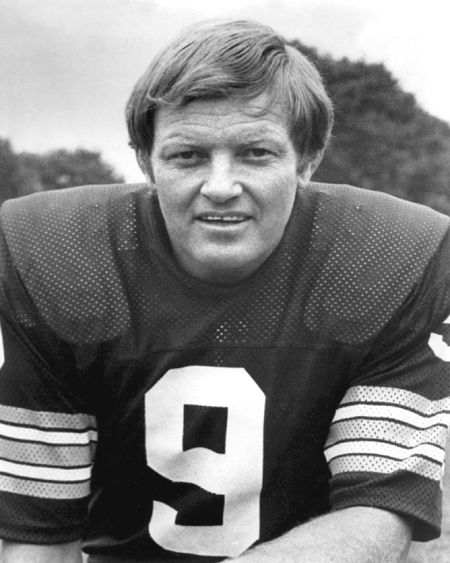
- Jurgensen with the Washington Redskins

No. 9
- Position: Quarterback

Personal information
- Born: August 23, 1934; Wilmington, North Carolina, U.S.
- Died: February 6, 2026 (aged 91); Naples, Florida, U.S.
- Listed height: 5 ft 11 in (1.80 m)
- Listed weight: 202 lb (92 kg)

Career information
- High school: New Hanover (Wilmington)
- College: Duke (1953–1956)
- NFL draft: 1957: 4th round, 43rd overall pick

Career history
- Philadelphia Eagles (1957–1963); Washington Redskins (1964–1974)

Awards and highlights
- NFL champion (1960); 2× first-team All-Pro (1961, 1969); 2× second-team All-Pro (1964, 1967); 5× Pro Bowl (1961, 1964, 1966, 1967, 1969); 5× NFL passing yards leader (1961, 1962, 1966, 1967, 1969); 2× NFL passing touchdowns leader (1961, 1967); NFL passer rating leader (1967); NFL completion percentage leader (1970); NFL 1960s All-Decade Team; Washington Commanders No. 9 retired; Philadelphia Eagles Hall of Fame; Washington Commanders Ring of Fame; 2× first-team All-ACC (1955, 1956); NFL record: 99-yard pass play (tied)

Career NFL statistics
- Passing attempts: 4,262
- Passing completions: 2,433
- Completion percentage: 57.1%
- TD–INT: 255–189
- Passing yards: 32,224
- Passer rating: 82.6
- Stats at Pro Football Reference
- Pro Football Hall of Fame

Christian Adolph "Sonny" Jurgensen III (August 23, 1934 – February 6, 2026) was an American professional football player who was a quarterback for 18 seasons in the National Football League (NFL) with the Philadelphia Eagles and Washington Redskins. Jurgensen played college football for the Duke Blue Devils. He was inducted into the Pro Football Hall of Fame in 1983. Jurgensen was also a color commentator for Washington's radio broadcast crew from 1981 to 2019.

== Early life and education ==
Jurgensen was born in Wilmington, North Carolina, on August 23, 1934. He started playing sports in elementary school, when he led his school to the city grammar school titles in baseball and basketball. He later won Wilmington's youth tennis championship and pitched for his local Civitan club, which won the city baseball title.

He attended New Hanover High School in Wilmington, where he was a three-sport athlete in football, basketball, and baseball. During his junior year, the New Hanover football team won the 1951 NCHSAA Class AAA state championship. Jurgensen mainly played halfback and linebacker his junior season, before starring as a quarterback his senior year. After his senior football season, he was chosen to start at quarterback for the North Carolina team in the annual North Carolina vs. South Carolina Shrine Bowl in Charlotte, North Carolina.

As a senior on the basketball team, he averaged 12 points per game as a guard and the team was the state AAA runner-ups. That same year in baseball, he batted .339 and played as a pitcher, infielder, and catcher. He also became a switch-hitter.

== College career ==
Jurgensen attended and played college football at Duke University. He joined the varsity team in 1954 as a backup quarterback behind Jerry Barger and he completed 12 of 28 passes for 212 yards, with one touchdown and three interceptions. Jurgensen made the biggest impact that season as a defensive back, when he tied a team record with interceptions in four consecutive games and ended the season with five interceptions total. Duke finished the campaign with a 7–2–1 regular-season record and an Atlantic Coast Conference (ACC) title. Then on New Year's Day, Duke beat Nebraska 34–7 in the 1955 Orange Bowl.

He took over as starting quarterback in 1955. He also retained a starting position in the defensive secondary. Duke ended the season with a 7–2–1 record along with an ACC co-championship, but did not go to a bowl game because Maryland received the league's automatic bid to the Orange Bowl. That season Jurgensen completed 37 of 69 passes for 536 yards, three touchdowns, and seven interceptions. He rushed 54 times for 48 yards and scored two touchdowns. He also punted four times for a 33.7 average and intercepted four passes for 17 yards.

Jurgensen's senior season in 1956 did not start well, when Duke lost to South Carolina, 7–0, in the season opener. This game marked Duke's first ACC loss, coming in the fourth year of the conference's existence. Duke finished the season with a 5–4–1 mark and Jurgensen ended up 28–59 for 371 yards. He threw six interceptions and two touchdown passes and rushed 25 times for 51 yards with three touchdowns. Jurgensen's final career stats included 77–156 passes for 1,119 yards, 16 interceptions, and six touchdowns. He also rushed for 109 yards and intercepted 10 passes.

He also played baseball briefly at Duke and turned down an invitation to try out for the basketball team.

== Professional career ==
=== Philadelphia Eagles (1957–1963) ===
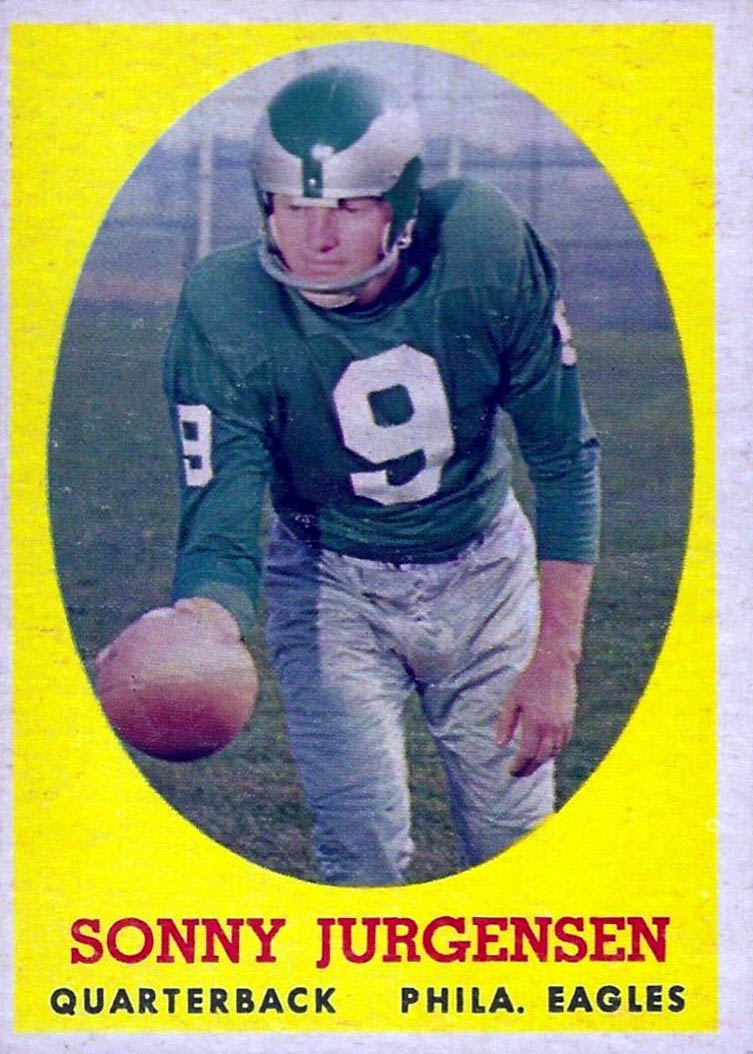
1958 Topps trading card of Jurgensen with the Philadelphia Eagles

"All I ask of my blockers is four seconds. I try to
stay on my feet and not be forced out of the
pocket. I beat people by throwing, not running.
I won't let them intimidate me into doing
something which is not the best thing I can do."

— Sonny Jurgensen, on his playing style.

Jurgensen was selected in the fourth round (43rd overall) of the 1957 NFL draft by the Philadelphia Eagles. He was Philadelphia's backup quarterback behind Bobby Thomason in 1957 and Norm Van Brocklin from 1958 through 1960. It was during this time as a backup that Jurgensen was a part of a championship team for the only time in his professional career, when the Eagles won the 1960 NFL Championship. Although he did not play quarterback in any playoff games, Jurgensen was the holder for field goals and extra points.

After Van Brocklin retired in 1961, Jurgensen took over as Philadelphia's starter and had a successful year, passing for an NFL record 3,723 yards, tying the NFL record with 32 touchdown passes, and was named a first-team All-Pro.

=== Washington Redskins (1964–1974) ===
Jurgensen was traded along with Jimmy Carr from the Eagles to the Washington Redskins for Norm Snead and Claude Crabb on March 31, 1964. The transaction was part of a youth movement by recently appointed Eagles head coach and general manager Joe Kuharich, as both Snead and Crabb were age 24 at the time while Jurgensen and Carr were 29 and 31 respectively. The situation was the opposite for Washington, which sacrificed youth for experience. He was then selected to play in the Pro Bowl following the season and was also named second-team All-Pro.

One of Jurgensen's most memorable games was during the 1965 season, when the Dallas Cowboys took a 21–0 lead at DC Stadium. Jurgensen then threw for 411 yards, leading the team back to win, 34–31. He rushed for a touchdown on a quarterback sneak and threw a game-winning 35-yard pass to Bobby Mitchell. In 1967, Jurgensen broke his own record by passing for 3,747 yards and also set NFL single-season records for attempts (508) and completions (288). Injuries hampered his performance during the 1968 season, however, with Jurgensen missing two games with broken ribs and suffering chronic pain in the elbow of his throwing arm due to calcium deposits. Jurgensen threw the ball just 292 times during the year, completing 167 for 1,980 yards and 17 touchdowns.

Meanwhile, he tied an NFL record early in the 1968 season for the longest pass play in league history. The 99-yard pass play to Jerry Allen occurred September 15, 1968, during the Redskins' game against the Chicago Bears. Coincidentally, Redskins' quarterbacks had three of the first four occurrences of a 99-yard pass play (Frank Filchock to Andy Farkas in 1939 and George Izo to Bobby Mitchell in 1963 were the other two occurrences of the play). Since Jurgensen's feat, no other Redskins' quarterback has completed a 99-yard pass.

In 1969, Vince Lombardi took over as the Redskins' head coach (and GM). That season, Jurgensen led the NFL in attempts (442), completions (274), completion percentage (62%), and passing yards (3,102). The Redskins went 7–5–2 and had their best season since 1955 (which kept Lombardi's record of never having coached a losing NFL team intact). Lombardi died of cancer shortly before the start of the 1970 season. Jurgensen would later say that, of the nine head coaches he played for during his NFL career, Lombardi was his favorite.

The Redskins enjoyed a resurgence in the early 1970s under coach George Allen and made it as far as Super Bowl VII, losing to the Miami Dolphins. However, Billy Kilmer started in place of Jurgensen, who was again bothered by injuries in 1971 and 1972.

During this period, a quarterback controversy developed between the two, complete with fans sporting "I Like Billy" or "I Like Sonny" bumper stickers on their vehicles. The defensive-minded Allen preferred Kilmer's conservative, ball-control style of play to Jurgensen's more high-risk approach. Despite the controversy, Jurgensen was helpful to his rival. Even until Jurgensen's death, Kilmer still stayed at his former teammate's house when he was in town.

In 1974, at the age of 40 and in his final season, Jurgensen won his third NFL passing crown even though he was still splitting time with Kilmer. In the final game of his NFL career, Jurgensen made his first and only appearance as a quarterback in an NFL postseason game in the Redskins' 19–10 loss to the Los Angeles Rams in the first round of the 1974 NFC playoffs. He came off the bench in relief of Kilmer and completed six of 12 passes but also threw three interceptions.

Jurgensen is recognized as the finest pure passer of his time. A five-time Pro Bowl selection, he earned three NFL individual passing titles. He exceeded 400 yards passing in a single game five times, and threw five touchdown passes in a game twice. With a career rating of 82.6, his stats include 2,433 completions for 32,224 yards and 255 touchdowns. He also rushed for 493 yards and 15 touchdowns.

Jurgensen's 82.62 career passer rating is the highest for any player in the "Dead Ball Era" (pre-1978).

Lombardi once told Pat Peppler of the Green Bay Packers head office that, "If we would have had Sonny Jurgensen in Green Bay, we'd never have lost a game."

== NFL career statistics ==
Legend
	Won the NFL Championship
	Led the league
**Bold**	Career high

Year	Team	Games		Passing								
Year	Team	GP	GS	Cmp	Att	Pct	Yds	Avg	TD	Int	Lng	Rtg
1957	PHI	10	4	33	70	47.1	470	6.7	5	8	61	53.6
1958	PHI	12	0	12	22	54.5	259	**11.8**	0	1	61	77.7
1959	PHI	12	0	3	5	60.0	27	5.4	1	0	19	114.2
1960	PHI	12	0	24	44	54.5	486	11.0	5	1	71	**122.0**
1961	PHI	14	14	235	416	56.5	3,723	8.9	**32**	24	69	88.1
1962	PHI	14	13	196	366	53.6	3,261	8.9	22	**26**	84	74.3
1963	PHI	9	8	99	184	53.8	1,413	7.7	11	13	75	69.4
1964	WAS	14	14	207	385	53.8	2,934	7.6	24	13	80	85.4
1965	WAS	13	13	190	356	53.4	2,367	6.6	15	16	55	69.6
1966	WAS	14	14	254	436	58.3	3,209	7.4	28	19	86	84.5
1967	WAS	14	14	**288**	**508**	56.7	**3,747**	7.4	31	16	86	87.3
1968	WAS	12	12	167	292	57.2	1,980	6.8	17	11	**99**	81.7
1969	WAS	14	14	274	442	62.0	3,102	7.0	22	15	88	85.4
1970	WAS	14	14	202	337	59.9	2,354	7.0	23	10	66	91.5
1971	WAS	5	1	16	28	57.1	170	6.1	0	2	30	45.2
1972	WAS	7	4	39	59	**66.1**	633	10.7	2	4	36	84.9
1973	WAS	14	4	87	145	60.0	904	6.2	6	5	36	77.5
1974	WAS	14	4	107	167	64.1	1,185	7.1	11	5	44	94.5
Career		218	147	2,433	4,262	57.1	32,224	7.6	255	189	99	82.6

== After football ==
After retiring from the Redskins following the 1974 season, Jurgensen began another career as a color commentator, initially with CBS on television. Later working with the Hall of Fame linebacker Sam Huff, Jurgensen continued to cover the Washington Redskins on radio.

Jurgensen covered the team for WRC-TV from 1994 until December 2008, when Redskins Report was cancelled due to budget cuts. He served as a game analyst at preseason games and as studio analyst at training camp, making weekly picks, and other assignments. He retired from broadcasting prior to the 2019 season.

Jurgensen served on the board of advisors of the Code of Support Foundation, a nonprofit military services organization.

== Honors ==
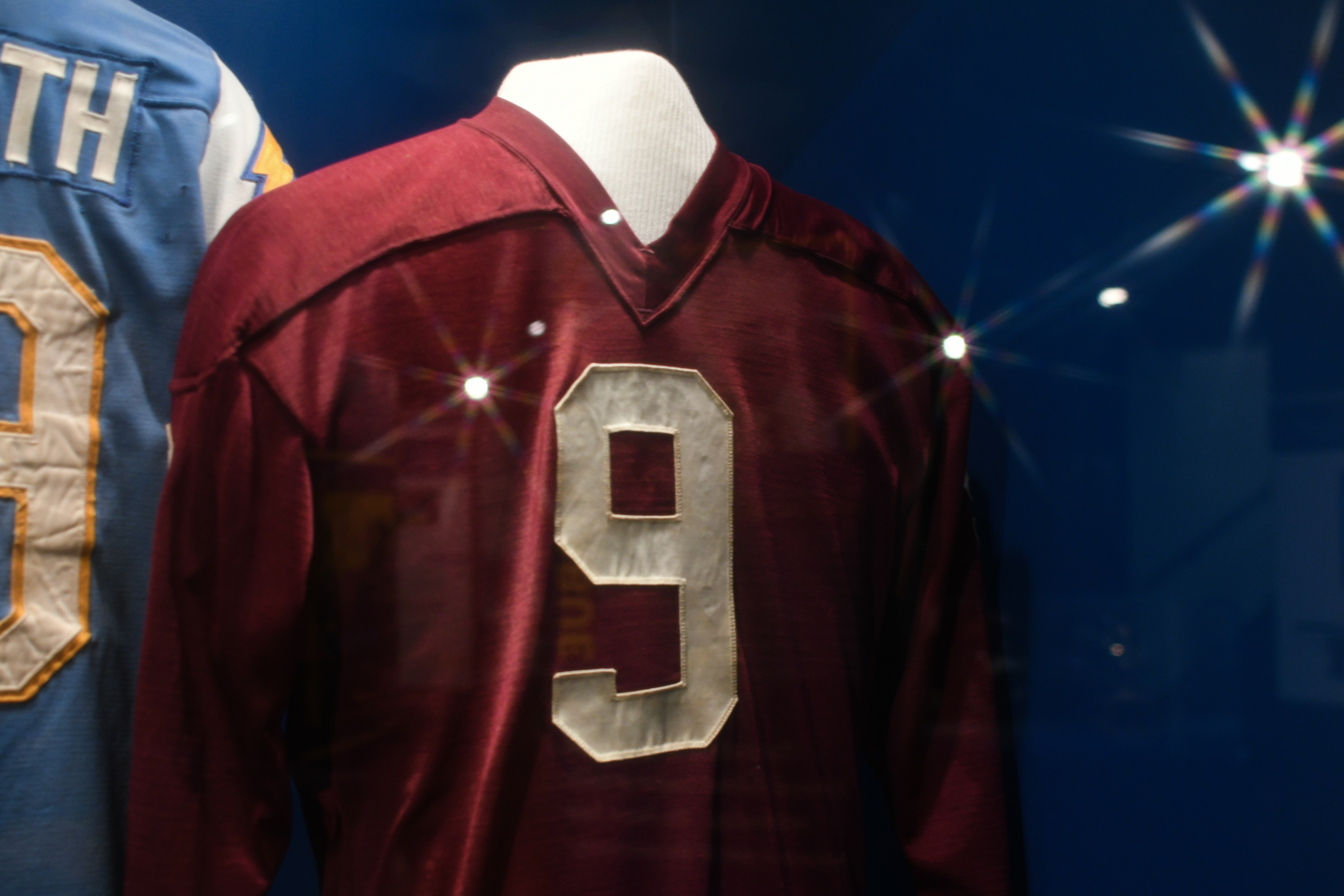
Jurgensen's #9 Redskins jersey exhibited at the Pro Football Hall of Fame

Jurgensen was inducted into the North Carolina Sports Hall of Fame in 1971 and the Duke Sports Hall of Fame in 1979. He was then inducted into the Pro Football Hall of Fame in 1983. In 1999, Jurgensen was ranked the ninth best sports figure from North Carolina by Sports Illustrated and became a member of Wilmington's Walk of Fame in 2004.

Washington retired Jurgensen's #9 jersey in 2022, during their week 18 game against the Dallas Cowboys.

== Personal life ==
Jurgensen met his first wife, Suzanne Long, while they were students at Duke. They had two sons, Greg and Scott, before later divorcing. Jurgensen married Margo Hurt in 1967. The couple had two sons, Erik and Gunnar.

Jurgensen died on February 6, 2026, in Naples, Florida, at the age of 91.
