= Charley Taylor =

American football player and coach (1941–2022)

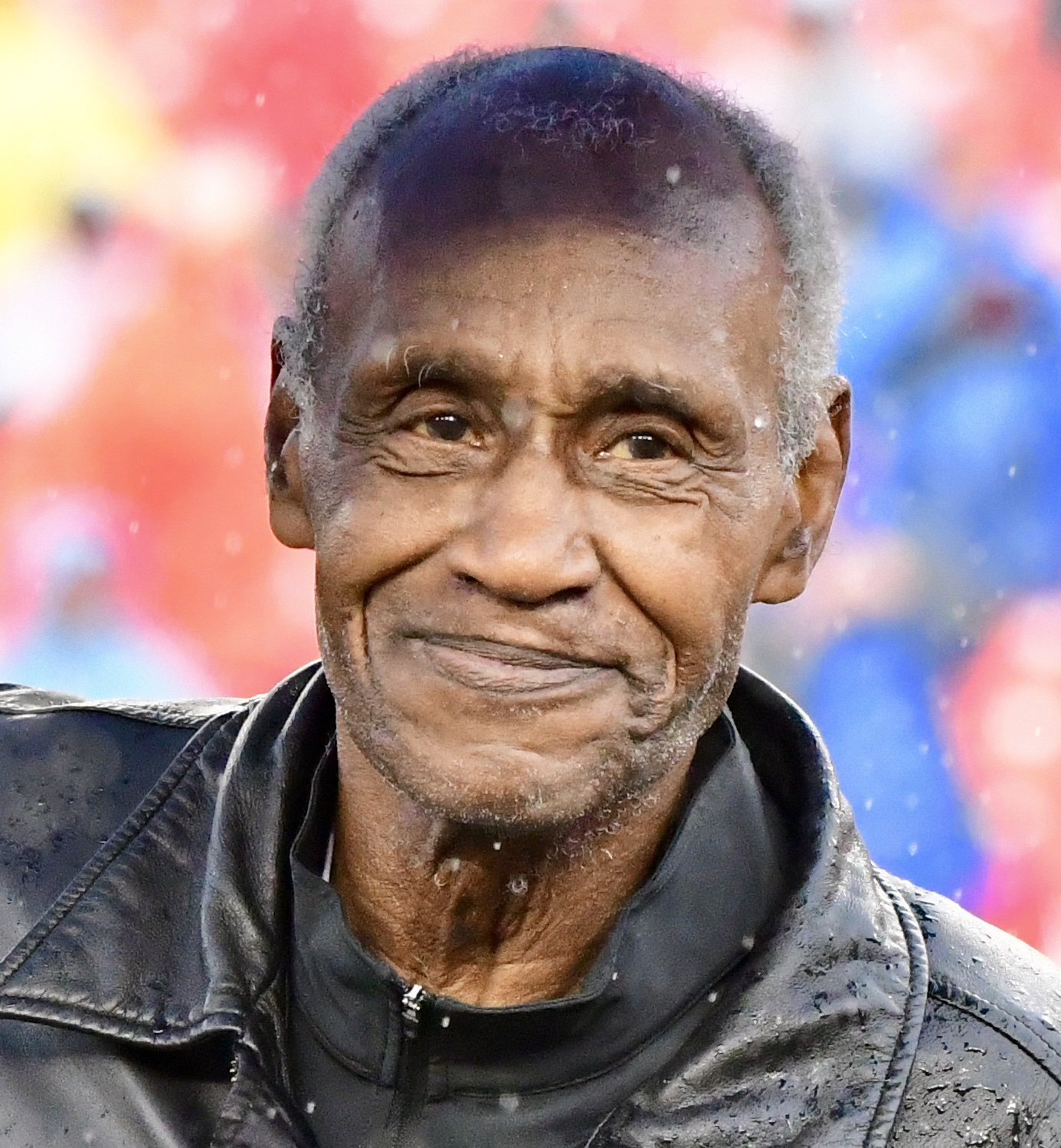
- Taylor in 2019

No. 42
- Positions: Wide receiver, running back

Personal information
- Born: September 28, 1941; Grand Prairie, Texas, U.S.
- Died: February 19, 2022 (aged 80); Ashburn, Virginia, U.S.
- Listed height: 6 ft 3 in (1.91 m)
- Listed weight: 210 lb (95 kg)

Career information
- High school: Dalworth (Grand Prairie)
- College: Arizona State (1961–1963)
- NFL draft: 1964: 1st round, 3rd overall pick
- AFL draft: 1964: 2nd round, 9th overall pick

Career history

Playing
- Washington Redskins (1964–1977)

Coaching
- Washington Redskins (1981–1993) Wide receivers coach

Awards and highlights
- As a player: First-team All-Pro (1967); 5× Second-team All-Pro (1964, 1966, 1968, 1969, 1974); 8× Pro Bowl (1964–1967, 1972–1975); NFL Rookie of the Year (1964); 2× NFL receptions leader (1966, 1967); NFL 1960s All-Decade Team; 90 Greatest Commanders; Commanders Ring of Fame; As a coach: 3× Super Bowl champion (XVII, XXII, XXVI)

Career NFL statistics
- Receptions: 649
- Receiving yards: 9,110
- Yards per reception: 14
- Receiving touchdowns: 79
- Rushing yards: 1,488
- Rushing touchdowns: 11
- Stats at Pro Football Reference
- Pro Football Hall of Fame

Charles Robert Taylor (September 28, 1941 – February 19, 2022) was an American professional football player who was a wide receiver for 13 seasons with the Washington Redskins of the National Football League (NFL). After playing college football for the Arizona State Sun Devils, he was selected by Washington in the first round of the 1964 NFL draft. With Taylor, the Redskins made the playoffs five times (1971–1974, 1976) and reached the Super Bowl once (VII), after the 1972 season. A six-time All-Pro and eight-time Pro Bowl selection, he was inducted into the Pro Football Hall of Fame in 1984.

== Early life ==
Taylor was born in Grand Prairie, Texas. He was the second of seven children, including four girls and three boys. Taylor was raised by his mother, Myrtle, and step father, James Stevenson. His mother was a domestic worker, chef, butcher and restaurant owner. His stepfather constructed parts for airplanes.

Taylor began playing sports in junior high school, and was playing football, baseball, basketball, and running in track by the eighth grade. He played high school football at Dalworth High School. In track and field, he competed in high hurdles, discus, shot put, and long jump. Although Dalworth did not have a baseball team, he played in a summer league. He earned all-state honors in both track and football.

== College career ==
Taylor played college football at Arizona State University (ASU) in Tempe as a halfback and defensive back. He was selected to the All-Western Athletic Conference team as a halfback. Following his final season with the Sun Devils, Taylor played in the East-West Shrine Game, the Hula Bowl, and the All-American Bowl. He also played in the College All-Star Game against the Chicago Bears in August 1964 and was named the most valuable player of the game. In his three seasons at ASU, Taylor gained 1,995 yards from scrimmage and averaged 5.7 yards per carry, while also scoring 25 touchdowns.

Taylor also pitched and played third base for the Sun Devils baseball team. However, during baseball practice, he was hit on a knee by a line drive, which ended his baseball career.

Taylor was inducted into the Arizona State Sports Hall of Fame as a charter member in 1975.

== Professional career ==
Taylor was selected by the Washington Redskins as the third overall pick of the 1964 NFL draft. He was also selected in the AFL draft, taken ninth by the Houston Oilers. Taylor signed with Washington and won the UPI rookie of the year award as a running back, and became the first NFL rookie in 20 years to finish in the top 10 in the league in both rushing (sixth with 755 yards) and receiving (eighth, 53 receptions for 814 yards). The 53 catches were a then-record for running backs.

Although known as a successful running back, Taylor was switched to wide receiver in 1966 and led the NFL in receiving in both 1966 and 1967. He played that position for the rest of his career and had a record-tying seven seasons with 50 or more receptions. In 1972, he scored two touchdowns in Washington's win over the Dallas Cowboys in the National Football Conference Championship Game, advancing them to their first Super Bowl. They lost in Super Bowl VII by a score of 14–7 to the undefeated Miami Dolphins. In the season finale in 1975, Taylor passed Don Maynard and became the NFL's all-time receptions leader with his 634th career catch on December 21 against the Philadelphia Eagles. Following Maynard's retirement in 1973, Taylor was the league's active leader in receiving yards for four seasons. He began 1974 with 7,470 yards, then 11th all-time, and climbed up to 4th.

Taylor retired following the 1977 season as the NFL's all-time leading receiver with 649 receptions, for 9,110 yards and 79 touchdowns. His career receptions record stood until 1984, when he was passed by Charlie Joiner. As of the NFL 2024 season Taylor's 79 receiving touchdowns was still the franchise record. With 1,488 yards rushing and some kick return yardage, Taylor totaled 10,803 combined net yards. Along with his 11 touchdowns rushing, Taylor scored 540 points in his career. He was named first- or second-team All-Pro six times and was selected to eight Pro Bowls.

Taylor was named to the NFL 1960s All-Decade Team. He was inducted into the Pro Football Hall of Fame in 1984, and was selected as one of the 70 Greatest Redskins of all time. In 1999, he was ranked number 85 on The Sporting News' list of its 100 greatest football players.

== Coaching career ==
After retiring, Taylor was hired to work in the Redskins' front office with Bobby Mitchell as a scout. He became their receivers coach in 1981, when Joe Gibbs became the head coach. He served on the coaching staff through 1993 under Richie Petitbon, but was not retained by new head coach Norv Turner in March 1994, ending three decades with the franchise.

== Personal life and death ==
Taylor and his wife Patricia married in 1965. The Taylors lived in Reston, Virginia. They had three children, Elizabeth, Erica, and Charles Jr., and three grandchildren, Robyn, Jordyn, and Nathan. He did speaking engagements and served as a consultant to the Commanders.

Taylor died on February 19, 2022, in Northern Virginia, at the age of 80.

== NFL career statistics ==
Legend
	Led the league
**Bold**	Career high

Year	Team	Games		Receiving					Rushing				
Year	Team	GP	GS	Rec	Yds	Avg	Lng	TD	Att	Yds	Avg	Lng	TD
1964	WAS	**14**	**14**	53	814	15.4	80	5	**199**	**755**	3.8	**50**	**5**
1965	WAS	13	13	40	577	14.4	69	3	145	402	2.8	39	3
1966	WAS	**14**	**14**	**72**	**1,119**	**15.5**	86	**12**	87	262	3.0	24	3
1967	WAS	12	12	70	990	14.1	86	9	–	–	–	–	–
1968	WAS	**14**	11	48	650	13.5	47	5	2	–3	–1.5	4	0
1969	WAS	**14**	**14**	71	883	12.4	**88**	8	3	24	8.0	18	0
1970	WAS	10	10	42	593	14.1	41	8	1	17	**17.0**	17	0
1971	WAS	6	6	24	370	15.4	71	4	–	–	–	–	–
1972	WAS	**14**	**14**	49	673	13.7	70	7	3	39	13.0	17	0
1973	WAS	**14**	**14**	59	801	13.6	53	7	1	–7	–7.0	–7	0
1974	WAS	**14**	**14**	54	738	13.7	51	5	1	–1	–1.0	–1	0
1975	WAS	**14**	**14**	53	744	14.0	64	6	–	–	–	–	–
1976	WAS	Missed season due to knee injury											
1977	WAS	12	7	14	158	11.3	19	0	–	–	–	–	–
Career		165	157	649	9,110	14.0	88	79	442	1,488	3.4	50	11
