= Bill Malinchak =

American football player (born 1944)

No. 81, 24
- Position: Wide receiver

Personal information
- Born: April 2, 1944 (age 82); Monessen, Pennsylvania, U.S.
- Listed height: 6 ft 1 in (1.85 m)
- Listed weight: 200 lb (91 kg)

Career information
- High school: Monessen
- College: Indiana (1962-1965)
- NFL draft: 1966: 3rd round, 39th overall pick

Career history
- Detroit Lions (1966–1969); Washington Redskins (1970–1976)

Awards and highlights
- First-team All-Big Ten (1964); Second-team All-Big Ten (1965)

Career NFL statistics
- Receptions: 35
- Receiving yards: 508
- Touchdowns: 5
- Stats at Pro Football Reference

William John Malinchak (born April 2, 1944) is an American former professional football player who was a wide receiver and special teams ace in the National Football League (NFL) during the 1960s and 1970s. He played college football for the Indiana Hoosiers

== Education and early football career ==
Malinchak attended suburban Pittsburgh's Monessen High School and played college football at Indiana University Bloomington for the Hoosiers.

== Professional football career ==
Malinchak's professional football career was spent with both the Detroit Lions and the Washington Redskins.
