= John Hoffman (defensive end) =

American football player (born 1943)

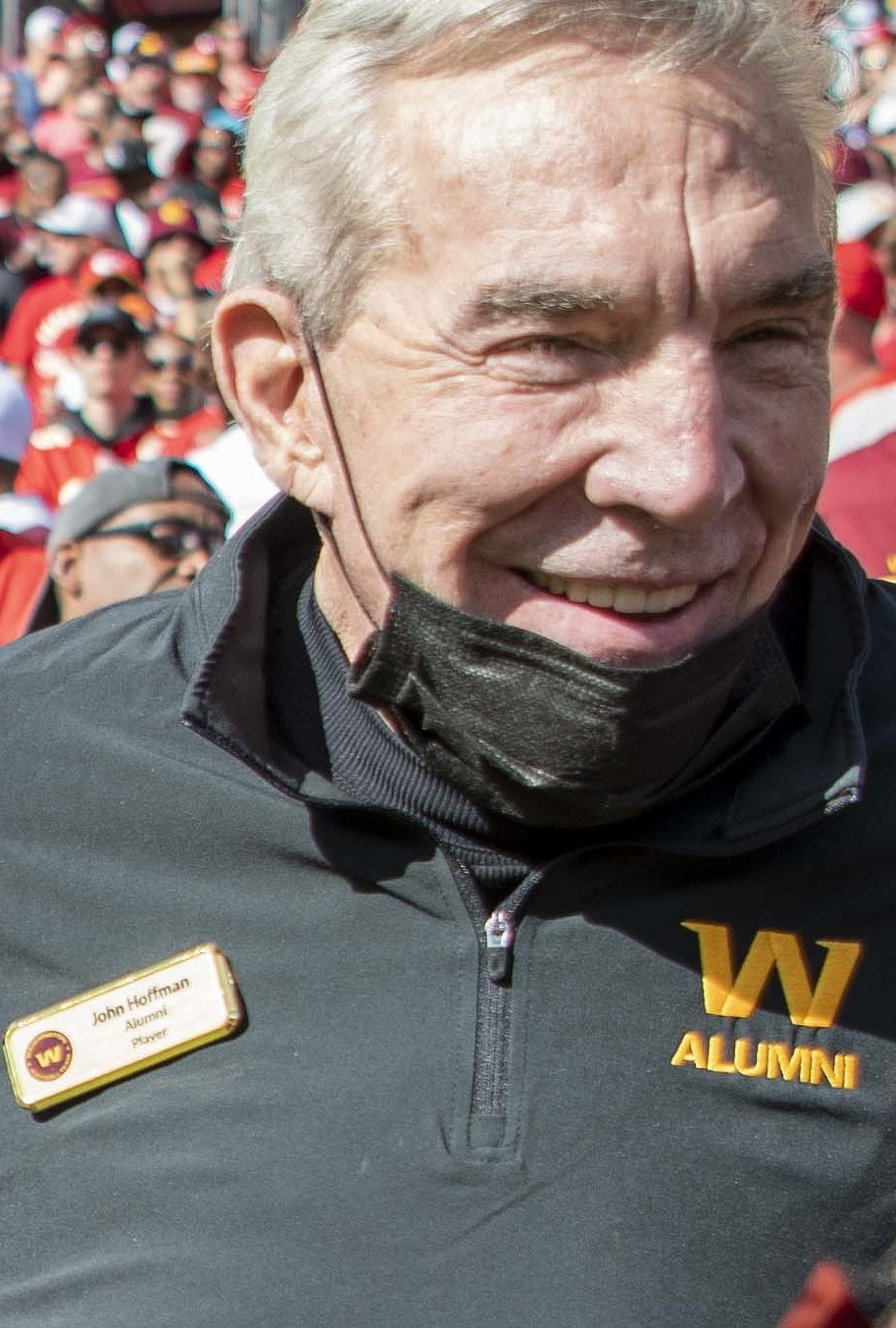
- Hoffman in 2021

No. 85, 79, 87, 70
- Position: Defensive end

Personal information
- Born: August 2, 1943 (age 83); Santa Monica, California

Career information
- College: Hawaii; Southern California

Career history
- 1969–1970: Washington Redskins
- 1971: Chicago Bears
- 1972: Denver Broncos
- 1972: St. Louis Cardinals
- Stats at Pro Football Reference

John Frederick Hoffman (born August 2, 1943) is an American former defensive end who played in the National Football League for the Washington Redskins, Chicago Bears, Denver Broncos, and the St. Louis Cardinals. He played college football at the University of Hawaii and the University of Southern California.

== Biography ==
Hoffman entered the U.S. Army upon graduation from high school in July 1961 and attended basic training at Fort Ord, California, followed by Advanced Individual Training as a 105 howitzer gun crew member at Fort Sill, Oklahoma. He was then assigned to the Survey Platoon in Headquarters and Headquarters Battery, 82nd Airborne Division Artillery. While with HHB Hoffman attended and graduated from one of the last Basic Airborne classes (jump school) conducted at Fort Bragg. While serving with the 82nd he made the Fort Bragg football team until he was recommended for the prestigious West Point Preparatory School at Fort Belvoir, Virginia. He was also active in lacrosse while at Fort Belvoir. Hoffman attended West Point Prep until his Army ETS (Expiration-Term of Service) in July 1964, after which he enrolled at USC.

Hoffman is an attorney and a part-time county court magistrate in Denver.
