= Curt Knight =

American football player (1943-2022)

No. 34, 5
- Position: Placekicker

Personal information
- Born: April 14, 1943; Gulfport, Mississippi, U.S.
- Died: March 23, 2022 (aged 78)
- Listed height: 6 ft 2 in (1.88 m)
- Listed weight: 190 lb (86 kg)

Career information
- High school: Mineral Wells (Mineral Wells, Texas)
- College: North Texas; Texas; Coast Guard (1965)
- NFL draft: 1966: undrafted

Career history
- Washington Redskins (1968)*; Virginia Sailors (1968); Washington Redskins (1969–1973)
- * Offseason or practice squad member only

Awards and highlights
- First-team All-Pro (1971); Pro Bowl (1971); NFL Leader FGs Made (1971)

Career NFL statistics
- Field goals: 101/175
- Field Goal %: 57.7
- Longest field goal: 52
- Stats at Pro Football Reference

Luther Curtis Knight Jr. (April 14, 1943 – March 23, 2022) was an American professional football player who was a placekicker for the Washington Redskins of the National Football League (NFL) from 1969 to 1973. He played college football for the Coast Guard Bears and is their only player to ever play in the NFL. Knight was an early adopter of the soccer style kick, having played soccer in high school and college, but switched to straight-on kicking in the NFL.

== Early life ==
Curt Knight was born in Gulf Port, MS to Luther Curtis Knight, Sr. and Dolores Juanita Miller Knight on April 14, 1943. His father was in the Coast Guard. He went to Mineral Wells High School for one year in 1960-61 where he played football and ran track.

Knight went to college at the United States Coast Guard Academy, where was played both soccer and football, but after his second year he was convinced to focus on football, despite having been an All-New England player in soccer. He played split end, safety and kicker in 1965.

From 1966-67 he was in the Army, where he also played football. He was the Best Kicker in league at Division Level both years.

== Pro Football ==
Knight had been a soccer-style kicker in high school and college; long before Charlie Gogolak had made it popular while kicking at Princeton. He switched to straight-on kicking when, as an undrafted free agent, he was offered a tryout with the Dallas Cowboys. They passed on him and he was brought to the Redskins by his former Coast Guard coach Otto Graham who was the Redskins head coach at the time. He signed with the Redskins later in 1968 but was cut during camp and then signed to the taxi squad. He spent the 1968 season on the taxi squad while also playing for the Virginia Sailors of the Atlantic Coast Football League during a season when they made it to the Championship game. For the Sailors he played both kicker and punter, led the league in average punt distance and was named an All-Pro.

He became the Redskins kicker in 1969, after the prior year starter Charlie Gogolak struggled in the preseason. That year Knight was the NFL's 6th leading scorer. In 1970 he was 7th in the NFC in scoring.

In 1971, Knight led the NFL in field goals made (29) and field goals attempted (49), and he led the NFC in scoring with 114 points (setting the then team record). Against Chicago he set a team record by kicking 5 field goals in a 15-16 loss where he also missed a 6th field goal. That season he was named All-NFL by the Newspaper Enterprise Association, made the Pro Bowl and was named All-NFC by the Sporting News.

In 1972, he was the NFC's 9th leading scorer and kicked a 52-yard field goal to tie the Redskins record longest kick set by John Aveni in 1961. That record was broken by Mark Moseley in 1977. He also set the club record, and tied the NFL record, for most field goals in a playoff game when he kicked four in a 26-3 win over the Dallas Cowboys.

During the off-season he worked toward a BBA at the University of Texas.

In 1973, he helped the Redskins make it to Super Bowl VII where they lost to the undefeated Miami Dolphins. With the Redskins down 14-0, he missed a 32-yard field goal in the 3rd quarter that coach George Allen called "an obvious turning point".

Before the 1974 season, George Allen brought in 14 other kickers to pressure Knight, who lost the job to Moseley. He quit the team before the 1974 season and did not report to training camp because he "was not satisfied with [his] working relationship there". In October the club put him on waivers and he became a free agent, able to be signed by any team except the Redskins. He was never picked up, though he turned down the Jets offer to be their interim kicker (which he found offensive), and he came to believe that he'd been blackballed from the NFL. Ironically, Moseley was injured going into the playoffs, but the Redskins could not sign Knight because they'd waived him.

== Later life ==
For some time shortly after his career ended, Knight went into the wholesale lumber business with a friend in Alexandria, VA.

In 2006, Knight was inducted into the Mineral Wells High School Athletic Hall of Fame.

Knight died on March 23, 2022.

Curt Knight is frequently cited as a former player for the Texas Longhorn and North Texas Mean Green football teams, but he was just a student at those schools.
