= Bob Brunet =

American football player (1946–2025)

No. 26
- Position: Running back

Personal information
- Born: July 29, 1946; Larose, Louisiana, U.S.
- Died: June 26, 2025 (aged 78)
- Listed height: 6 ft 1 in (1.85 m)
- Listed weight: 205 lb (93 kg)

Career information
- High school: Cut Off (Larose)
- College: Louisiana Tech
- NFL draft: 1968: 7th round, 176th overall pick

Career history
- Washington Redskins (1968–1977)

Career NFL statistics
- Rushing yards: 406
- Rushing average: 3.1
- Receptions: 24
- Receiving yards: 200
- Total touchdowns: 4
- Stats at Pro Football Reference

Robert Paul Brunet (July 29, 1946 – June 26, 2025) was an American professional football player who was a running back for the Washington Redskins of the National Football League (NFL). He played college football for the Louisiana Tech Bulldogs and was selected in the seventh round of the 1968 NFL/AFL draft.

== College career ==
Brunet led the Bulldogs in rushing in 1965 with 477 yards and again in 1967 with 631 yards, earning all-conference honors in each of those season (a foot injury sidelined Brunet for all of 1966). Over the course of his college career he had five 100-yard-plus games, including a 224-yard effort against Lamar in 1967.

== NFL career ==
As a rookie for the Redskins in 1968, Brunet was Washington's second-leading rusher with 227 yards. He also caught 18 passes for 160 yards and a touchdown. As a pro player, he was used primarily on special teams, appearing overall in 81 games over eight seasons--not including the 1969 he sat out and 1974 he missed due to injuries. Brunet retired after suffering a career-ending injury during the 1977 season.

== Business career ==
In 1973, Brunet and his brother, Billy, began a seafood delivery business in Baton Rouge, Louisiana. They then turned the company into a restaurant, which opened in 1977 under the name The Galley before being renamed to Brunet's Cajun Restaurant in the early 1980s. They retired in 2011 and closed the restaurant.

== Personal life and death ==
In 2022, Brunet was inducted into the Bayou Region Athletic Hall of Fame.

Brunet died on June 26, 2025, at the age of 78.
