= Charlie Gogolak =

American football player (born 1944)

No. 3, 7
- Position: Placekicker

Personal information
- Born: December 29, 1944 (age 81); Rábahídvég, Hungary
- Listed height: 5 ft 10 in (1.78 m)
- Listed weight: 165 lb (75 kg)

Career information
- High school: Ogdensburg Free Academy (Ogdensburg, New York, U.S.)
- College: Princeton
- NFL draft: 1966: 1st round, 6th overall pick
- AFL draft: 1966: 7th round, 56th overall pick

Career history
- Washington Redskins (1966–1968); Boston/New England Patriots (1970–1972)

Awards and highlights
- First-team All-American (1965); First-team All-East (1965)

Career NFL statistics
- Field goals: 52/93
- Field goal %: 55.9
- Longest field goal: 51
- Stats at Pro Football Reference

Charles Paul Gogolak (in Hungarian: Gogolák Károly Pál, born December 29, 1944) is a Hungarian former player of American football who was a placekicker in the National Football League (NFL).

The sixth overall selection of the 1966 NFL draft, Gogolak was signed out of Princeton University by the Washington Redskins, marking the first time that a placekicker was selected in the first round. He played for the Redskins, as well as the New England Patriots. Gogolak was one of the first "soccer style" placekickers in the NFL, along with his older brother Pete. The brothers combined to score fourteen extra points in a single game in 1966, tied for the most ever, in a 72–41 win over the New York Giants. Charlie made nine of ten PAT's and a game-ending field goal while Pete converted on five of six extra points.

Gogolak worked in finance after the NFL. His son, Charles K. Gogolak, played for a year for the Princeton Tigers men's soccer team and moved to Hollywood after graduation. He cofounded Zaftig Films in 2011 and was an executive producer on This Is Us.
