= Harold McLinton =

American football player (1947–1980)

No. 53
- Position: Linebacker

Personal information
- Born: July 1, 1947; Fort Valley, Georgia, U.S.
- Died: October 31, 1980 (aged 33); Washington, D.C., U.S.
- Listed height: 6 ft 2 in (1.88 m)
- Listed weight: 235 lb (107 kg)

Career information
- High school: Harper (Atlanta, Georgia)
- College: Southern
- NFL draft: 1969: 6th round, 139th overall pick

Career history
- Washington Redskins (1969–1978)

Awards and highlights
- 70 Greatest Redskins

Career NFL statistics
- Games played: 127
- Interceptions: 4
- Touchdowns: 1
- Stats at Pro Football Reference

Harold Lucious McLinton (July 1, 1947 – October 31, 1980) was an American professional football player who was a linebacker for the Washington Redskins of the National Football League (NFL) from 1969 to 1978. He played college football for the Southern Jaguars.

McLinton was selected by the Redskins in the sixth round of the 1969 NFL/AFL draft. He spent his entire 10-year career with the Redskins, playing in 127 games. He was a key contributor on the 1972 NFC championship team. He finished his career with four interceptions and one touchdown.

McLinton died on October 31, 1980, at the age of 33 from complications resulting from massive injuries sustained after being struck by a passing vehicle on Interstate 295 in southeast Washington after stopping to help a stranger change a flat tire. He was a 1966 graduate of Harper High School in Atlanta, GA and went on to attend Southern on a football scholarship. He graduated May 1969 with a bachelor's degree in Marketing & Management.
