= 1966 Washington Redskins season =

NFL team season

- Owner: George Preston Marshall
- General manager: Otto Graham
- President: Edward Bennett Williams
- Head coach: Otto Graham
- Home stadium: D.C. Stadium

Results
- Record: 7–7
- Division place: 5th NFL Eastern
- Playoffs: Did not qualify
- Pro Bowlers: LB Chris Hanburger; C Len Hauss; QB Sonny Jurgensen; HB Charley Taylor

The 1966 Washington Redskins season was the franchise's 35th season in the National Football League (NFL) and their 30th in Washington, D.C. The Washington Redskins attempted to make Vince Lombardi their new head coach, but Lombardi refused their offer and the Redskins had to settle for Otto Graham instead. They finished with a 7–7 record, fifth place in the eight-team Eastern Conference.

In Week Twelve, the Redskins set an NFL record for most points by one team in a regular season game, scoring 72 points against the Giants. Coincidentally, this was one point less than the all-time record, the 73 scored against Washington by Chicago in the 1940 NFL Championship Game. They were the last team to score at least 70 points in a regular season game until the Miami Dolphins did so in Week 3 of the 2023 season.

== Offseason ==
=== NFL draft ===
1966 Washington Redskins draft
| Round | Selection | Player | Position | College |
|---|---|---|---|---|
| 1 | 6 | Charlie Gogolak | K | Princeton |

== Roster ==
1966 Washington Redskins roster
| Quarterbacks (QB): 9 Sonny Jurgensen; 14 Dick Shiner; Running backs (RB): 32 Tom Barrington; 35 Joe Don Looney; 25 A. D. Whitfield; Wide receivers (WR): 48 John Burrell; 20 Fred Mazurek; 49 Bobby Mitchell; 42 Charley Taylor; Tight ends (TE): 88 Pat Richter P; 87 Jerry Smith | Offensive linemen (OL): 57 Dave Crossan C; 69 Tom Goosby G; 56 Len Hauss C; 75 John Kelly T; 67 Jake Kupp G; 65 Vince Promuto G; 62 Ray Schoenke G; 74 Jim Snowden T; 64 Mitch Johnson T; Defensive linemen (DL): 50 Willie Adams DE; 61 Jim Avery DE; 77 Walt Barnes DT; 86 Bill Briggs DE; 73 Stan Jones DT; 66 Carl Kammerer DE; 78 Ron Snidow DE/DT | Linebackers (LB): 60 Jim Carroll MLB; 55 Chris Hanburger OLB; 70 Sam Huff MLB; 53 Steve Jackson OLB; 51 John Reger OLB; Defensive backs (DB): 32 Billy Clay CB; 46 Rickie Harris CB; 26 Paul Krause FS; 23 Brig Owens SS; 40 Lonnie Sanders CB; 47 Jim Shorter CB; 43 Tom Walters FS; Special teams (ST): 3 Charlie Gogolak K | Practice squad: 80 Pat Hodgson WR; 17 Harry Theofiledes QB; Reserve: 54 Don Croftcheck G (IR); -- George Hughley RB (IR); -- Dick LeMay DE (Military); 72 Joe Rutgens DT (IR); 39 Steve Thurlow RB (IR); Rookies in italics |

1966 Washington Redskins staff
| Front office: Director of Player Personnel -- Tim Temerario; Player Personnel -- Bob White; Player Personnel -- Mike Allman; Opponent's Scout -- Wayne Millner; Team Physician -- George A. Resta, MD; Trainer: Joe Kuczo; Equipment Manager -- Kelly Miller; Head coaches: Head Coach – Otto Graham; Offensive coaches: Don Doll; Mike McCormack; Ray Renfro | Defensive coaches: Ed Hughes; Mike Scarry |

== Preseason ==
| Week | Date | Opponent | Result | Record | Venue | Attendance |
|---|---|---|---|---|---|---|
| 1 | August 3 | Baltimore Colts | L 0–35 | 0–1 | D.C. Stadium | 45,805 |
| 2 | August 20 | vs. Chicago Bears | L 10–24 | 0–2 | Foreman Field (Norfolk, VA) | 20,609 |
| 3 | August 26 | vs. Minnesota Vikings | L 27–30 | 0–3 | Cleveland Stadium (Cleveland, OH) | 83,418 |
| 4 | September 3 | Philadelphia Eagles | W 35–20 | 1–3 | D.C. Stadium | 30,969 |

== Regular season ==
=== Schedule ===
| Week | Date | Opponent | Result | Record | Venue | Attendance | Recap |
|---|---|---|---|---|---|---|---|
| 1 | September 11 | **Cleveland Browns** | **L** 14–38 | 0–1 | D.C. Stadium | 48,643 | Recap |
| 2 | September 18 | at **St. Louis Cardinals** | **L** 7–23 | 0–2 | Busch Memorial Stadium | 40,198 | Recap |
| 3 | September 25 | at **Pittsburgh Steelers** | **W** 33–27 | 1–2 | Pitt Stadium | 37,505 | Recap |
| 4 | October 2 | **Pittsburgh Steelers** | **W** 24–10 | 2–2 | D.C. Stadium | 47,360 | Recap |
| 5 | October 9 | **Atlanta Falcons** | **W** 33–20 | 3–2 | D.C. Stadium | 50,116 | Recap |
| 6 | October 16 | at **New York Giants** | **L** 10–13 | 3–3 | Yankee Stadium | 62,865 | Recap |
| 7 | October 23 | **St. Louis Cardinals** | **W** 26–20 | 4–3 | D.C. Stadium | 50,154 | Recap |
| 8 | October 30 | at **Philadelphia Eagles** | **W** 27–13 | 5–3 | Franklin Field | 60,658 | Recap |
| 9 | November 6 | at Baltimore Colts | **L** 10–37 | 5–4 | Memorial Stadium | 60,238 | Recap |
| 10 | November 13 | **Dallas Cowboys** | **L** 30–31 | 5–5 | D.C. Stadium | 50,927 | Recap |
| 11 | November 20 | at **Cleveland Browns** | **L** 3–14 | 5–6 | Cleveland Municipal Stadium | 78,466 | Recap |
| 12 | November 27 | **New York Giants** | **W** 72–41 | 6–6 | D.C. Stadium | 50,439 | Recap |
| 13 | Bye | | | | | | |
| 14 | December 11 | at **Dallas Cowboys** | **W** 34–31 | 7–6 | Cotton Bowl | 64,198 | Recap |
| 15 | December 18 | **Philadelphia Eagles** | **L** 28–37 | 7–7 | D.C. Stadium | 50,405 | Recap |
Note: Intra-conference opponents are in **bold** text.

- A bye week was necessary in 1966, as the league expanded to an odd-number (15) of teams (Atlanta); one team was idle each week.

=== Game summaries ===
==== Week 6 at New York Giants ====
Week Six: Washington Redskins (3-2) at New York Giants (0-4-1)

| Quarter | 1 | 2 | 3 | 4 | Total |
|---|---|---|---|---|---|
| Redskins | 3 | 7 | 0 | 0 | **10** |
| Giants | 0 | 3 | 0 | 10 | **13** |

at Yankee Stadium, New York

- Date: October 16
- Game weather: 64 °F (18 °C)
- Box Score

Game information

**First quarter**

- Washington – Charlie Gogolak 37-yard field goal, Redskins 3–0.

**Second quarter**

- Washington – Bobby Mitchell 7-yard pass from Sonny Jurgensen (Gogolak kick), Redskins 10–0.
- New York – Pete Gogolak 15-yard field goal, Redskins 10–3.

**Third quarter**

**Fourth quarter**

- New York – Pete Gogolak 18-yard field goal, Redskins 10–6.
- New York – Aaron Thomas 29-yard pass from Earl Morrall (Gogolak kick), Giants 13–10.

**Top Passers**

- Redskins – Sonny Jurgensen: 9/20, 125 yds, 1 TD, 2 INT
- Giants – Earl Morrall: 5/14, 139 yds, 1 TD, 1 INT

**Top rushers**

- Redskins – Steve Thurlow: 11 car, 44 yds.
- Giants – Chuck Mercein: 14 car, 37 yds,

**Top receivers**

- Redskins – Bobby Mitchell: 2 rec, 58 yds. 1 TD
- Giants – Homer Jones: 4 rec, 146 yds.

==== Week 10 vs Dallas Cowboys ====
Week Ten: Dallas Cowboys (5–2–1) at Washington Redskins (5–4)

| Quarter | 1 | 2 | 3 | 4 | Total |
|---|---|---|---|---|---|
| **Cowboys** | 7 | 7 | 7 | 10 | **31** |
| Redskins | 6 | 0 | 17 | 7 | **30** |

at District of Columbia Stadium, Washington, D.C.

- Date: November 13, 1966
- Game weather: 40 °F (4 °C)
- Game attendance: 50,927
- Box Score

==== Week 12 vs New York Giants ====
Week Twelve: Washington Redskins (5-6) vs New York Giants (1-8-1)

| Quarter | 1 | 2 | 3 | 4 | Total |
|---|---|---|---|---|---|
| Giants | 0 | 14 | 14 | 13 | **41** |
| Redskins | 13 | 21 | 14 | 24 | **72** |

at D.C. Stadium, Washington D.C.

- Date: November 27
- Game weather: 42 °F (6 °C)
- Box Score

Game information

**First quarter**

- Washington – A.D. Whitfield 5-yard pass from Sonny Jurgensen, Redskins 6–0.
- Washington – A.D. Whitfield 63-yard rush (Gogolak kick), Redskins 13–0.

**Second quarter**

- Washington – Brig Owens 62-yard fumble return (Gogolak kick), Redskins 20–0.
- New York – Allen Jacobs 6-yard rush (Gogolak kick), Redskins 20 – 7.
- Washington – A.D. Whitfield 1-yard rush (Gogolak kick), Redskins 27–7.
- Washington – Joe Don Looney 9-yard rush (Gogolak kick), Redskins 34–7.
- New York – Gary Wood 1-yard rush (Gogolak kick), Redskins 34 – 14.

**Third quarter**

- New York – Jim Morrison 41-yard pass from Gary Wood (Gogolak kick), Redskins 34 – 21.
- Washington – Charley Taylor 32-yard pass from Sonny Jurgensen (Gogolak kick), Redskins 41–21.
- New York – Homer Jones 50-yard pass from Gary Wood (Gogolak kick), Redskins 41-28.
- Washington – Charley Taylor 74-yard pass from Sonny Jurgensen (Gogolak kick), Redskins 48–28.

**Fourth quarter**

- Washington – Rickie Harris 52-yard punt return (Gogolak kick), Redskins 55–28.
- Washington – Brig Owens 60-yard interception return (Gogolak kick), Redskins 62–28.
- New York – Aaron Thomas 18-yard pass from Tom Kennedy, Redskins 62–34.
- New York – Dan Lewis 1-yard rush (Gogolak kick), Redskins 62–41.
- Washington – Bobby Mitchell 45-yard rush (Gogolak kick), Redskins 69–41.
- Washington – Charlie Gogolak 29-yard field goal, Redskins 72–41.

**Top Passers**

- Giants – Tom Kennedy: 13/21, 165 yds, 1 TD, 3 INT
- Redskins – Sonny Jurgensen: 10/16, 145 yds, 3 TD

**Top rushers**

- Giants – Joe Morrison: 16 car, 59 yds,
- Redskins – A.D. Whitfield: 6 car, 74 yds. 2 TD

**Top receivers**

- Giants – Homer Jones: 6 rec, 85 yds.1 TD
- Redskins – Charley Taylor: 6 rec, 124 yds. 2 TD

== Standings ==
NFL Eastern Conference
| | W | L | T | PCT | CONF | PF | PA | STK |
|---|---|---|---|---|---|---|---|---|
| Dallas Cowboys | 10 | 3 | 1 | .769 | 9–3–1 | 445 | 239 | W1 |
| Cleveland Browns | 9 | 5 | 0 | .643 | 9–4 | 403 | 259 | W1 |
| Philadelphia Eagles | 9 | 5 | 0 | .643 | 8–5 | 326 | 340 | W4 |
| St. Louis Cardinals | 8 | 5 | 1 | .615 | 7–5–1 | 264 | 265 | L3 |
| Washington Redskins | 7 | 7 | 0 | .500 | 7–6 | 351 | 355 | L1 |
| Pittsburgh Steelers | 5 | 8 | 1 | .385 | 4–8–1 | 316 | 347 | W2 |
| Atlanta Falcons | 3 | 11 | 0 | .214 | 2–5 | 204 | 437 | L1 |
| New York Giants | 1 | 12 | 1 | .077 | 1–11–1 | 263 | 501 | L8 |

Note: Tie games were not officially counted in the standings until 1972.

== Awards, records, and honors ==
Most points in a single game in regular season NFL history.
