= 1966 New York Giants–Washington Redskins game =

Highest scoring NFL game

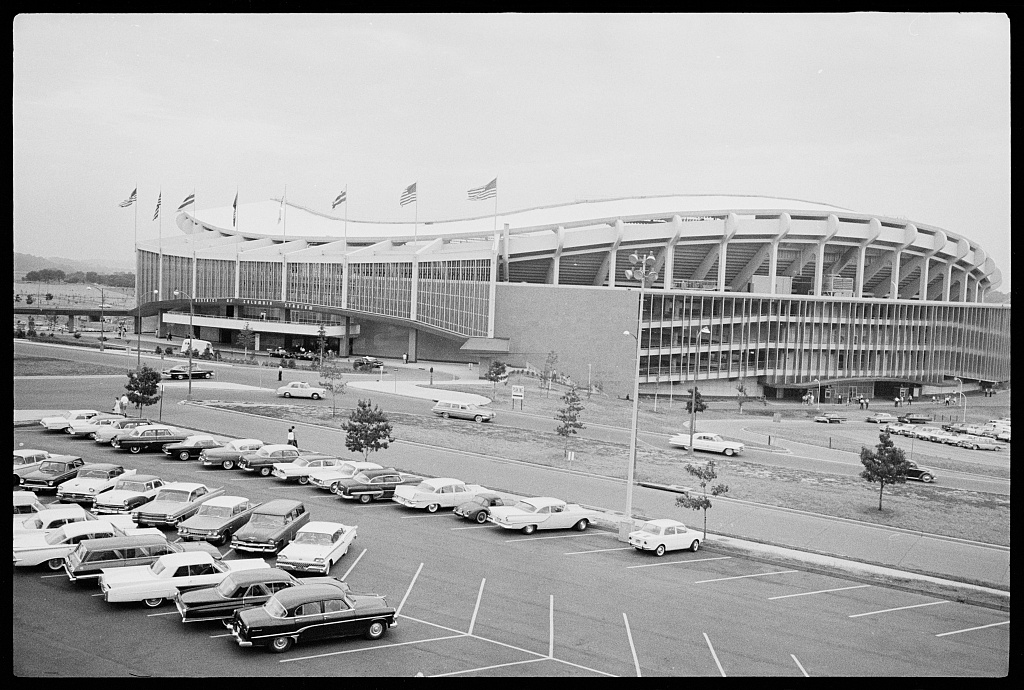
- Robert F. Kennedy Memorial Stadium (then known as District of Columbia Stadium), the Redskins' home stadium where the game took place, as seen in 1963
New York Giants (1–8–1)	Washington Redskins (5–6)
41	72
Head coach: Allie Sherman	Head coach: Otto Graham
	1	2	3	4	Total
NY	0	14	14	13	41
WAS	13	21	14	24	72
- Date: November 27, 1966
- Stadium: District of Columbia Stadium; Washington, D.C.
- Favorite: Redskins by 17
- Attendance: 50,439

On November 27, 1966, the New York Giants played the Washington Redskins at District of Columbia Stadium in Washington, D.C. in week 12 of the 1966 NFL season. In the game, the Redskins defeated the Giants by a score of 72–41, making it the highest scoring game in NFL history at 113 combined points.

The game was the second meeting between the Giants and Redskins that season; the Giants had won the previous meeting in New York City by a score of 13–10. The second game finished with a 72–41 score and set several NFL records. Among the records set included most points scored by both teams (113), most points scored by a single team in the regular season (72), most touchdowns scored by both teams (16), most extra points converted by both teams (14), and most extra points attempted (10) and converted (9) by one person.

The Redskins became the third of only four NFL teams to score at least 70 points in a single game. A field goal in the game's last 7 seconds by Redskins kicker Charlie Gogolak brought the Redskins' final point total to 72, breaking the regular season single-game points record. Redskins head coach claimed he had Gogolak attempt the kick as practice as he had missed two field goals the week prior, while Redskins linebacker Sam Huff claimed he called for the field goal to get revenge on the Giants for trading him a couple years earlier.

== Background ==
In the 1966 NFL season, both the New York Giants and the Washington Redskins were members of the Eastern Conference. As members of the same conference, the teams played each other twice in a home-and-away series. On October 16, the Giants defeated the Redskins by a score of 13–10 at Yankee Stadium in New York City. It was the Giants' first win of the season, improving their record to 1–4–1; it was the Redskins' third loss, dropping their record to 3–3.

The Giants and Redskins were scheduled to play each other at District of Columbia Stadium in Washington, D.C. in week 12. By then, the Giants had lost all their games and entered week 12 with a 1–8–1 record, while the Redskins entered with a 5–6 record on a three-game losing streak. Both teams had also been eliminated from playoff contention.

== Game summary ==
=== First quarter ===
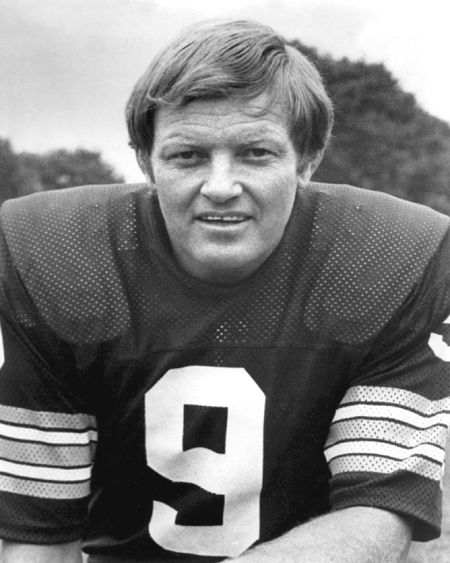
Redskins quarterback Sonny Jurgensen threw 3 passing touchdowns.

Giants rookie quarterback Tom Kennedy made his first career start in the game, and his first pass was intercepted by Redskins rookie safety Brig Owens. Redskins quarterback Sonny Jurgensen led the team on the ensuing drive ending in a 5-yard touchdown pass by Jurgensen to halfback A. D. Whitfield. Giants defensive tackle Jim Moran blocked the extra point attempt by soccer-style kicker Charlie Gogolak to keep the score at 6–0. Later in the first quarter, Whitfield scored a 63-yard touchdown rush, and Charlie Gogolak converted the extra point to extend the lead to 13–0. Charlie Gogolak would not miss an extra point attempt for the rest of the game.

=== Second quarter ===
Kennedy failed to complete a single pass on any of the Giants' first four drives of the game due to blitzes by the Redskins defense. Halfway into the second quarter, Redskins linebacker Chris Hanburger tackled Kennedy and forced a fumble. Owens recovered the football and returned it for a 62-yard fumble recovery touchdown, the first of his career, to extend the lead to 20–0. The Giants responded after Kennedy led the team down the field and fullback Allen Jacobs scored a 6-yard touchdown rush. Charlie Gogolak's brother, Pete Gogolak, converted the Giants' extra point to cut the Redskins' lead down to 20–7.

The Redskins intercepted Kennedy on the Giant's next drive leading to Whitfield scoring a 1-yard touchdown rush to extend the lead to 27–7. Kennedy was intercepted for a third time, this time by safety Paul Krause, culminating in a 9-yard touchdown rush (Note: This play is listed by Pro Football Reference as being a 9-yard rush, while the Pro Football Hall of Fame lists the play as a 10-yard rush.) by halfback Joe Don Looney, extending the lead to 34–7. Following Kennedy's third interception, Giants head coach Allie Sherman benched Kennedy and inserted Gary Wood at quarterback. Wood led the Giants on a drive that ended in him scoring a 1-yard touchdown rush. The score at halftime was 34–14.

=== Third quarter ===
On the Giants' first drive of the second half, Wood completed a 11-yard pass to halfback Joe Morrison followed by a 41-yard touchdown pass, also to Morrison, to cut the Redskins' lead to 34–21. On the ensuing Redskins drive, Jurgensen led a drive that ended in a 32-yard touchdown pass to split end (wide receiver) Charley Taylor to extend the lead to 41–21. Woods then threw a 50-yard touchdown pass to split end Homer Jones to once again cut the Giants deficit to 41–28. The last touchdown of the quarter came when Jurgensen threw a 74-yard pass to Taylor, the game's longest scoring play, to extend their lead to 48–28.

=== Fourth quarter ===
The Redskins forced the Giants to punt on their first drive of the fourth quarter, and return specialist Rickie Harris returned the punt for a 52-yard touchdown to extend the Redskins lead to 55–28. A few plays later, Owens intercepted Woods and returned it for a 60-yard touchdown, (Note: This play is listed by Pro Football Reference as being a 60-yard interception return, while the Pro Football Hall of Fame lists the play as a 62-yard interception return.) extending the lead to 62–28. On the Giants' next drive, Sherman inserted Kennedy back as quarterback. On the drive, he completed five passes, one of them being an 18-yard passing touchdown to flanker (wide receiver) Aaron Thomas. Pete Gogolak missed the extra point (his only miss of the game), and the score remained 62–34. Redskins head coach Otto Graham pulled Jurgensen from the game due to the lead they held and inserted backup Dick Shiner into the game. Shiner's only pass of the game was intercepted by cornerback Carl Lockhart, and the Giants turned the interception into a 1-yard touchdown rush by halfback Dan Lewis to make the score 62–41. The Giants attempted an onside kick with 1:35 remaining in the game, but the Redskins recovered and halfback Bobby Mitchell later scored a 45-yard touchdown rush.

On the last drive of the game, Kennedy attempted to lead the Giants down the field but were unable to advance the ball out of their own territory. With 7-second left, Kennedy threw the ball out of bounds to stop the clock; he thought it was third down, but it was actually fourth down leading to a turnover on downs. Instead of taking a knee to end the game, the Redskins sent out Charlie Gogolak to kick a 29-yard field goal. (Note: This play is listed by Pro Football Reference as being a 29-yard field goal, while the Pro Football Hall of Fame lists the play as a 23-yard field goal.) The game ended with a final score of 72–41.

=== Boxscore ===
New York Giants at Washington Redskins (summary)

Quarter	1	2	3	4	Total
Giants	0	14	14	13	41
Redskins	13	21	14	24	72

at District of Columbia Stadium

- Date: November 27, 1966
- Game weather: 42 °F (6 °C), wind 5 mph (8.0 km/h)
- Game attendance: 50,439
- Boxscore (Pro Football Reference) Boxscore (Pro Football Hall of Fame)

Game information

First quarter

- WAS – A. D. Whitfield 5-yard pass from Sonny Jurgensen (Charlie Gogolak kick blocked). Redskins 6–0.
- WAS – A. D. Whitfield 63-yard rush (Charlie Gogolak kick). Redskins 13–0.

Second quarter

- WAS – Brig Owens 62-yard fumble return (Charlie Gogolak kick). Redskins 20–0.
- NY – Allen Jacobs 6-yard rush (Pete Gogolak kick). Redskins 20–7.
- WAS – A. D. Whitfield 1-yard rush (Charlie Gogolak kick). Redskins 27–7.
- WAS – Joe Don Looney 9-yard rush (Charlie Gogolak kick). Redskins 34–7.
- NY – Gary Wood 1-yard rush (Pete Gogolak kick) Redskins 34–14.

Third quarter

- NY – Joe Morrison 41-yard pass from Gary Wood. (Pete Gogolak kick). Redskins 34–21.
- WAS – Charley Taylor 32-yard pass from Sonny Jurgensen (Charlie Gogolak kick). Redskins 41–21.
- NY – Homer Jones 50-yard pass from Gary Wood (Pete Gogolak kick). Redskins 41–28.
- WAS – Charley Taylor 74-yard pass from Sonny Jurgensen (Charlie Gogolak kick). Redskins 48–28.

Fourth quarter

- WAS – Rickie Harris 52-yard punt return (Charlie Gogolak kick). Redskins 55–28.
- WAS – Brig Owens 60-yard interception return (Charlie Gogolak kick). Redskins 62–28.
- NY – Aaron Thomas 18-yard pass from Tom Kennedy. (Pete Gogolak kick failed). Redskins 62–34.
- NY – Dan Lewis 1-yard rush (Pete Gogolak kick). Redskins 62–41.
- WAS – Bobby Mitchell 45-yard rush (Charlie Gogolak kick). Redskins 69–41.
- WAS – Charlie Gogolak 29-yard field goal. Redskins 72–41.

Top passers

- NY – Tom Kennedy: 13/21, 165 yards, TD, 3 INT
- WAS – Sonny Jurgensen: 10/16, 145 yards, 3 TD

Top rushers

- NY – Joe Morrison: 16 rushes, 59 yards
- WAS – A. D. Whitfield: 6 rushes, 74 yards, 2 TD

Top receivers

- NY – Joe Morrison: 4 receptions, 98 yards, TD
- WAS – Charley Taylor: 6 receptions, 124 yards, 2 TD

== Final statistics ==
=== Team statistics ===
Statistic	New York	Washington
First downs	25	16
Rushing attempts	33	24
Total yards	389	341
Rushing yards	111	209
Yards per rush	3.4	8.7
Passing – completions/attempts	20/33	10/18
Times sacked–total yards	4–33	2–13
Interceptions thrown	5	1
Net yards passing	278	132
Penalties–total yards	8–119	8–107
Fumbles–lost	2–1	2–1
Turnovers	6	2

=== Individual statistics ===
Giants passing
	C/ATT	Yds	TD	INT	Rating
Tom Kennedy	13/21	165	1	3	62.7
Gary Wood	7/12	146	2	2	101.4
Giants rushing
	Car	Yds	TD	LG	Yds/Car
Joe Morrison	16	59	0	9	3.7
Allen Jacobs	10	25	1	7	2.5
Dan Lewis	4	19	1	13	4.8
Chuck Mercein	2	8	0	7	4.0
Tom Kennedy	1	8	0	8	8.0
Gary Wood	3	−8	1	1	−2.7
Giants receiving
	Rec	Yds	TD	Yds/Rec	Targets
Joe Morrison	4	98	1	41	24.5
Homer Jones	6	85	1	50	14.2
Aaron Thomas	4	82	1	35	20.5
Allen Jacobs	2	29	0	29	14.5
Bobby Crespino	3	22	0	19	7.3
Chuck Mercein	1	−5	0	−5.0	−5.0
Giants kicking
	FG/Made	FG%	XP/Made	XP%	Pts
Pete Gogolak	–	–	5/6	83.3%	5

Redskins passing
	C/ATT	Yds	TD	INT	Rating
Sonny Jurgensen	10/16	145	3	0	131.5
Tom Barrington	0/1	0	0	0	39.6
Dick Shiner	0/1	0	0	1	0.0
Redskins rushing
	Car	Yds	TD	LG	Yds/Car
A. D. Whitfield	6	74	2	63	12.3
Bobby Mitchell	2	54	1	45	27.0
Joe Don Looney	10	46	1	11	4.6
Tom Barrington	5	26	0	20	5.2
Steve Thurlow	1	9	0	9	9.0
Redskins receiving
	Rec	Yds	TD	LG	Yds/Rec
Charley Taylor	6	124	2	74	20.7
Jerry Smith	1	12	0	12	12.0
A. D. Whitfield	1	5	1	5	5.0
Joe Don Looney	2	4	0	6	3.0
Redskins kicking
	FG/Made	FG%	XP/Made	XP%	Pts
Charlie Gogolak	1/1	100.0%	9/10	90.0%	12

== Starting lineups ==
Pro Football Hall of Fame inductee‡

New York	Position	Washington
Offense
Tom Kennedy	QB	Sonny Jurgensen‡
Joe Morrison	HB	A. D. Whitfield
Allen Jacobs	FB	Steve Thurlow
Aaron Thomas	FL	John Burrell
Homer Jones	SE	Charley Taylor‡
Bobby Crespino	TE	Jerry Smith
Willie Young	LT	Mitch Johnson
Pete Case	LG	Ray Schoenke
Greg Larson	C	Len Hauss
Bookie Bolin	RG	Vince Promuto
Roger Davis	RT	Jim Snowden
Defense
Jim Katcavage	LDE	Ron Snidow
Jim Moran	LDT	Stan Jones‡
Don Davis	RDT	Walt Barnes
Glen Condren	RDE	Carl Kammerer
Jeff Smith	LLB	John Reger
Mike Ciccolella	MLB	Sam Huff‡
Freeman White	RLB	Chris Hanburger‡
Carl Lockhart	LCB	Billy Clay
Clarence Childs	RCB	Rickie Harris
Wendell Harris	LS	Brig Owens
Henry Carr	RS	Paul Krause‡

== Aftermath ==
=== NFL records set ===
"Little Big Horn was worse. There were no survivors among General Custer's troops."

— Dave Brady, The Washington Post

The Redskins' 72 points set the NFL's regular season record for most point scored in a single game, breaking the 16-year-old record set by the Los Angeles Rams when they defeated the Baltimore Colts by a score of 70–27. The Redskins became the third team to score 70 or more points in a single game after the Rams in 1950 and the Chicago Bears who defeated, ironically, the Redskins by a score of 73–0 in the 1940 NFL Championship Game. No team would score 70 or more points in a game again until the 2023 season when the Miami Dolphins defeated the Denver Broncos by a score of 70–20.

The Giants and Redskins scored a combined 113 points, making it the highest scoring game in NFL history. The two teams also combined to score a record 16 touchdowns, nine of which went for 30 yards or more. The New York Times' Bill Wallace reported that after the game, Graham jokingly remarked that "[the game] was a great defensive battle". The Associated Press contrasted the high-scoring game to a 6–3 low scoring affair between the St. Louis Cardinals and the Pittsburgh Steelers that took place that same day.

A total of 16 extra points were attempted by Charlie and Pete Gogolak, 14 of which were successful, tying the NFL record. Charlie Gogolak set the NFL record for most extra points attempted in a game (10) and tied the record for most extra points converted in a game (9). In 2023, Dolphins kicker Jason Sanders tied the former record and broke the latter record, going 10-for-10 on extra point attempts. In 1966, District of Columbia Stadium did not have nets behind the goalposts. According to a newspaper, 14 footballs were lost in the stands, 13 of which were due to the extra point attempts. The fourteenth was lost when Owens threw a football into the stands following his 62-yard fumble return touchdown. According to the Pro Football Hall of Fame, a football cost $22.50 (equivalent to $223 in 2025) at the time, meaning that the game cost the Redskins $315 (equivalent to $3,126 in 2025) in lost footballs. Due to this game, the Redskins installed nets in the stadium the following year to prevent balls from being lost.

=== Decision for Charlie Gogolak's field goal ===
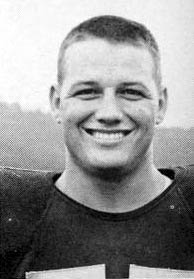
Redskins linebacker Sam Huff claimed that he called for Charlie Gogolak's field goal that gave the team 72 points.

After the game, reporters asked Graham if Charlie Gogolak's field goal at the end of the game was intended to break the regular season single-game scoring record, Graham stated "hell no, I didn't know anything about records". He explained that he wanted Charlie Gogolak to practice a field goal as he had not had a chance all game and he missed two field goals the week prior against the Cleveland Browns. Graham also told reporters that "I'm not one to run up a score on anyone" and that "in a crazy game like this, what's another three points?"

Sherman was not pleased by Charlie Gogolak's field goal. According to Ed Croke, a Giants public relations employee, Sherman "went out of his mind" and was not satisfied with Graham's field goal practice excuse as Charlie Gogolak had just scored numerous extra points. Columnist Shirley Povich joked that the field goal was an attempt by Graham to prevent the Giants from making a 28-point comeback in the game's last 7 seconds. He also wrote that Graham could have been having fun at Sherman's expense and that the field goal was "perhaps, the first field goal ever aimed at the jugular".

In Hall of Fame linebacker Sam Huff's autobiography, he claimed that he, not Graham, called for Charlie Gogolak's field goal attempt at the end of the game. Huff explained that he did so because he had not forgiven Giants head coach Sherman's decision to trade him to the Redskins after the Giants' 1963 season. According to Huff, he called for the field goal team to take to the field while Graham was telling Jurgensen what to do on fourth down to run out the game's final seconds, "and before anyone knew what was happening, [Charlie] Gogolak had kicked a 29-yard field goal for a final score of 72–41". Huff had also told Graham before the game to "show no mercy" and that the team was "going to beat the hell out of them [the Giants]".

=== Teams' remaining games ===
The 72–41 Redskins victory improved their record to 6–6 while the Giants fell to 1–9–1. The Giants lost their final three games and finished the season with a 1–12–1 record. Their earlier 13–10 victory against the Redskins ended up being their only win of the season. The season was the Giants' worst in team history up to that point. Kennedy appeared in the Giants' last two games, throwing four interceptions in one of them, although he did not start either. He did not appear in another NFL game after the season. The Redskins entered their bye week in week 13, after which they defeated the Dallas Cowboys and lost to the Philadelphia Eagles to finish with a 7–7 record. It was the first time the Redskins had finished with a record of at least .500 since their 1956 season.

== See also ==
- Commanders–Giants rivalry
