= 1966 New York Giants season =

NFL team season

- Owner: Wellington Mara
- General manager: Raymond J. Walsh
- Head coach: Allie Sherman
- Home stadium: Yankee Stadium

Results
- Record: 1–12–1
- Division place: 8th NFL Eastern
- Playoffs: Did not qualify
- Pro Bowlers: CB Spider Lockhart

The 1966 New York Giants season was the franchise's 42nd season in the National Football League (NFL). The season saw the Giants looking to improve on their 7–7 record from 1965. However, they finished in last place in the Eastern Conference with a 1–12–1 record, the worst in franchise history. The 12 losses set a single-season team record that was matched four times before being broken in 2017.

The 1966 Giants surrendered the most points in NFL history for a 14-game season. They allowed 501 points in 14 games, or an average of 35.8 points per game. This total broke the league record for the most points given up in a season. The next most points allowed by a Giants team was 451 in the 2019 season, which was 16 games. The Giants allowed opponents to score more than 30 points in eight of the 14 games, and gave up over 50 points three times. They are the only team in history to give up 500 points in a 14-game season.

On November 27, the Giants played the highest-scoring game in NFL history, losing to the Washington Redskins, 72–41 and making them the last team until the 2023 Denver Broncos to surrender at least 70 points in a regular season game. It was the first of three straight games in which the Giants gave up more than 45 points; they allowed 49 points against the Cleveland Browns and 47 versus the Pittsburgh Steelers.

== Off-season ==
=== NFL draft ===
1966 New York Giants draft
Round	Pick	Player	Position	College	Notes
1	10	Francis Peay	Offensive tackle	Missouri	
2	33	Don Davis	Defensive tackle	Cal State Los Angeles	
3	40	Tom Fisher	Linebacker	Tennessee	
5	75	Bill Briggs	Defensive end	Iowa	
7	104	Phil Harris	Safety	Texas	
8	113	Charlie Harper	Offensive tackle	Oklahoma State	
8	113	Bill Matan	Wide receiver	Kansas State	
9	132	Freeman White	Tight end	Nebraska	
10	151	Jeff Smith	Linebacker	USC	
11	165	Cliff Wilder	Wide receiver	Iowa	
12	179	Ken Avery	Linebacker	Southern Miss	
Made roster

=== Undrafted free agents ===
1966 undrafted free agents of note
Player	Position	College
Cornelius Barrett	Defensive tackle	St. Paul's (Virginia)

== Roster ==
1966 New York Giants roster
Quarterbacks (QB): 18 Tom Kennedy; 19 Gary Wood; Running backs (RB): 27 Steve Bowman; 30 Allen Jacobs; 23 Ernie Koy P; 41 Dan Lewis; 29 Chuck Mercein; Wide receivers (WR): 45 Homer Jones; 33 Pep Menefee; 40 Joe Morrison; Tight ends (TE): 89 Bobby Crespino; 88 Aaron Thomas	Offensive linemen (OL): 63 Bookie Bolin G; 65 Pete Case G; 66 Roger Davis T; 62 Darrell Dess G; 61 Charlie Harper G; 53 Greg Larson C; 55 Bob Scholtz C/T; 55 Joe Wellborn C; 69 Willie Young T; Defensive linemen (DL): 83 Glen Condren DE/DT; 76 Don Davis DT; 75 Jim Katcavage DE; 70 Bill Matan DE; 74 Jim Moran DT; 72 Jim Prestel DT	Linebackers (LB): 58 Mike Ciccolella MLB; 87 Jerry Hillebrand OLB/MLB; 38 Stan Sczurek OLB; 57 Jeff Smith OLB; 81 Freeman White OLB; Defensive backs (DB): 28 Henry Carr FS; 48 Clarence Childs CB; 26 Wendell Harris SS; 46 Phil Harris SS; 43 Carl Lockhart CB; 22 Dick Lynch CB; 20 Jimmy Patton CB/S; Special teams (ST): 3 Pete Gogolak K	Practice squad: Jim Fulgham DT; Ted Holman CB; Peterson Matthews WR; Roger Milici WR; Bobby Post QB; Randy Staten G; Gerald Stevenson RB; Owen Thomas G; Reserve: 77 Rosey Davis DE (IR); 24 Tucker Frederickson RB (IR); 70 Jim Garcia DE (IR); -- John LoVetere DT (IR); -- Randy Minniear RB (IR); 11 Earl Morrall QB (IR); 78 Francis Peay T (IR); 33 Smith Reed RB (IR); 85 Del Shofner WR (IR); 52 Bill Swain LB (IR); 25 Larry Vargo LB (IR); Rookies in italics

== Regular season ==
=== Schedule ===
Week	Date	Opponent	Result	Record	Venue	Attendance
1	September 11	at Pittsburgh Steelers	T 34–34	0–0–1	Pitt Stadium	37,693
2	September 18	at Dallas Cowboys	L 7–52	0–1–1	Cotton Bowl	60,010
3	September 25	at Philadelphia Eagles	L 17–35	0–2–1	Franklin Field	60,177
4	October 2	Cleveland Browns	L 7–28	0–3–1	Yankee Stadium	62,916
5	October 9	at St. Louis Cardinals	L 19–24	0–4–1	Busch Memorial Stadium	43,893
6	October 16	Washington Redskins	W 13–10	1–4–1	Yankee Stadium	62,865
7	October 23	Philadelphia Eagles	L 3–31	1–5–1	Yankee Stadium	63,018
8	Bye					
9	November 6	St. Louis Cardinals	L 17–20	1–6–1	Yankee Stadium	62,967
10	November 13	at Los Angeles Rams	L 14–55	1–7–1	Los Angeles Memorial Coliseum	34,746
11	November 20	Atlanta Falcons	L 16–27	1–8–1	Yankee Stadium	62,746
12	November 27	at Washington Redskins	L 41–72	1–9–1	D.C. Stadium	50,439
13	December 4	at Cleveland Browns	L 40–49	1–10–1	Cleveland Municipal Stadium	61,651
14	December 11	Pittsburgh Steelers	L 28–47	1–11–1	Yankee Stadium	62,658
15	December 18	Dallas Cowboys	L 7–17	1–12–1	Yankee Stadium	62,735

=== Game summaries ===
==== Week 1 at Pittsburgh Steelers ====
Week One: New York Giants (0–0) vs. Pittsburgh Steelers (0–0)

Quarter	1	2	3	4	Total
Giants	7	10	0	17	34
Steelers	7	7	17	3	34

at Pitt Stadium, Pittsburgh

- Date: September 11
- Game weather: 64 °F (18 °C)
- Box Score

Game information

First quarter

- New York – Homer Jones 75-yard pass from Earl Morrall (Gogolak kick), Giants 7–0
- Pittsburgh – Gary Ballman 9-yard pass from Bill Nelsen (Clark kick), 7–7

Second quarter

- New York – Bobby Crespino 19-yard pass from Earl Morrall (Gogolak kick), Giants 14–7.
- Pittsburgh – Willie Asbury 6-yard run (Clark kick), 14–14.
- New York – Pete Gogolak 26-yard field goal, Giants 17–14.

Third quarter

- Pittsburgh – Simmons 21-yard pass from Bill Nelsen (Clark kick), Steelers 21–17
- Pittsburgh – Mike Clark 25-yard field goal, Steelers 24–17.
- Pittsburgh – John Hilton 31-yard pass from Bill Nelsen (Clark kick), Steelers 31–17.

Fourth quarter

- New York – Pete Gogolak 14-yard field goal, Steelers 31–20.
- New York – Homer Jones 98-yard pass from Earl Morrall (Gogolak kick) Steelers 31–27.
- New York – Wendall Harris 72-yard fumble return (Gogolak kick), Giants 34–31.
- Pittsburgh – Mike Clark 41-yard field goal, 34–34.

Top Passers

- Giants – Earl Morrall: 10/18, 273 yds, 3 TD, 2 INT
- Steelers – Bill Nelsen: 16/27, 265 yds, 3 TD

Top rushers

- Giants – Chuck Mercein: 8 car, 14 yds
- Steelers – Willie Asbury: 18 car, 83 yds. 1 TD

Top receivers

- Giants – Homer Jones: 2 rec, 173 yds. 2 TD
- Steelers – Gary Ballman: 5 rec, 114 yds. 1 TD

==== Week 2 at Dallas Cowboys ====
Week Two: New York Giants (0–0–1) at Dallas Cowboys (0–0)

Quarter	1	2	3	4	Total
Giants	0	7	0	0	7
Cowboys	7	24	14	7	52

at Cotton Bowl, Dallas

- Date: September 18
- Game weather: 73 °F (23 °C)
- Box Score

Game information

First quarter

- Dallas – Don Perkins 1-yard rush (Villanueva kick), Cowboys 7–0.

Second quarter

- New York – Homer Jones 20-yard pass from Earl Morrall (Gogolak kick) 7–7.
- Dallas – Bob Hayes 74-yard pass from Don Meredith (Villanueva kick), Cowboys 14–7.
- Dallas – Danny Villanueva 12-yard field goal, Cowboys 17–7.
- Dallas – Dan Reeves 2-yard pass from Don Meredith (Villanueva kick), Cowboys 24–7.
- Dallas – Dan Reeves 1-yard pass from Don Meredith (Villanueva kick), Cowboys 31–7.

Third quarter

- Dallas – Bob Hayes 39-yard pass from Don Meredith (Villanueva kick), Cowboys 38–7.
- Dallas – Dan Reeves 19-yard pass from Don Meredith (Villanueva kick), Cowboys 45–7.

Fourth quarter

- Dallas – Cornell Green 41-yard interception return (Villanueva kick), Cowboys 52–7

Top Passers

- Giants – Earl Morrall: 9/25, 106 yds, 1 TD, 2 INT
- Cowboys – Don Meredith: 14/24, 358 yds, 5 TD

Top rushers

- Giants – Chuck Mercein: 11 car, 83 yds
- Cowboys – Don Perkins: 16 car, 52 yds, 1 TD

Top receivers

- Giants – Homer Jones: 4 rec, 46 yds. 1 TD
- Cowboys – Bob Hayes: 6 rec, 195 yds. 2 TD

==== Week 3 at Philadelphia Eagles ====
Week Three: New York Giants (0–1–1) at Philadelphia Eagles (1–1)

Quarter	1	2	3	4	Total
Giants	0	3	7	7	17
Eagles	7	14	7	7	35

at Franklin Field, Philadelphia

- Date: September 25
- Game weather: 55 °F (13 °C)
- Box Score

Game information

First quarter

- Philadelphia – Timmy Brown 1-yard rush (Baker kick), Eagles 7–0.

Second quarter

- Philadelphia – Timmy Brown 7-yard pass from Norm Snead (Baker kick), Eagles 14–0.
- Philadelphia – Pete Retzlaff 37-yard pass from Norm Snead (Baker kick), Eagles 21–0.
- New York – Pete Gogolak 18-yard field goal. Eagles 21–3.

Third quarter

- New York– Homer Jones 34-yard pass from Earl Morrall (Gogolak kick), Eagles 21–10.
- Philadelphia – Earl Gros 30-yard pass from Norm Snead (Baker kick), Eagles 28–10.

Fourth quarter

- Philadelphia – Earl Gros 1-yard rush (Baker kick), Eagles 35 – 10.
- New York – Joe Morrison 8-yard pass from Gary Wood (Gogolak kick), Eagles 35 – 17.

Top Passers

- Giants – Earl Morrall: 14/25, 181 yds, 1 TD, 1 INT
- Eagles – Norm Snead: 10/18, 179 yds, 3 TD

Top rushers

- Giants – Chuck Mercein: 18 car, 82 yds
- Eagles – Timmy Brown: 16 car, 40 yds, 1 TD

Top receivers

- Giants – Homer Jones: 5 rec, 95 yds. 1 TD
- Eagles – Pete Retzlaff: 5 rec, 120 yds. 1 TD

==== Week 4 vs Cleveland Browns ====
Week Four: New York Giants (0–2–1) vs Cleveland Browns (1–2)

Quarter	1	2	3	4	Total
Browns	7	7	0	14	28
Giants	0	7	0	0	7

at Yankee Stadium, New York City

- Date: October 2
- Game weather: 52 °F (11 °C)
- Box Score

Game information

First quarter

- Cleveland – Milt Morin 20-yard pass from Frank Ryan (Groza kick), Browns 7–0.

Second quarter

- Cleveland – Leroy Kelly 3-yard rush (Groza kick), Browns 14–0.
- New York– Homer Jones 17-yard pass from Gary Wood (Gogolak kick), Browns 14–7.

Third quarter

Fourth quarter

- Cleveland – Ernie Green 14-yard rush (Groza kick), Browns 21–7.
- Cleveland – Paul Warfield 9-yard pass from Frank Ryan (Groza kick), Browns 28–7.

Top Passers

- Browns – Frank Ryan: 14/24, 171 yds, 2 TD, 1 INT
- Giants – Earl Morrall: 10/23, 177 yds, 3 INT

Top rushers

- Browns – Leroy Kelly: 20 car, 138 yds. 1 TD
- Giants – Dan Lewis: 9 car, 24 yds,

Top receivers

- Browns – Gary Collins: 4 rec, 88 yds.
- Giants – Homer Jones: 4 rec, 88 yds. 1 TD

==== Week 5 at St. Louis Cardinals ====
Week Five: New York Giants (0–3–1) at St. Louis Cardinals (4–0)

Quarter	1	2	3	4	Total
Giants	10	3	0	6	19
Cardinals	0	0	7	17	24

at Busch Memorial Stadium, St. Louis

- Date: October 9
- Game weather: 64 °F (18 °C)
- Box Score

Game information

First quarter

- New York – Pete Gogolak 32-yard field goal. Giants 3–0.
- New York– Homer Jones 9-yard pass from Earl Morrall (Gogolak kick), Giants 10–0.

Second quarter

- New York – Pete Gogolak 37-yard field goal, Giants 13–0.

Third quarter

- St. Louis – Johnny Roland 2-yard rush (Bakken kick), Giants 13–7.

Fourth quarter

- New York – Pete Gogolak 47-yard field goal, Giants 16–7.
- St. Louis – Bobby Joe Conrad 40-yard pass from Johnny Roland (Bakken kick), Giants 16–14.
- New York – Pete Gogolak 47-yard field goal, Giants 19–14.
- St. Louis – Billy Gambrell 30-yard pass from Charley Johnson (Bakken kick), Cardinals 21–19.
- St. Louis – Jim Bakken 36-yard field goal, Cardinals 24–19.

Top Passers

- Giants – Earl Morrall: 19/35, 162 yds, 1 TD, 2 INT
- Cardinals – Charley Johnson: 8/17, 139 yds, 1 TD, 2 INT

Top rushers

- Giants – Ernie Koy Jr.: 22 car, 81 yds,
- Cardinals – Johnny Roland: 19 car, 60 yds. 1 TD

Top receivers

- Giants – Aaron Thomas: 8 rec, 86 yds.
- Cardinals – Jackie Smith: 3 rec, 49 yds.

==== Week 6 vs Washington Redskins ====
Week Six: New York Giants (0–4–1) vs Washington Redskins (3–2)

Quarter	1	2	3	4	Total
Redskins	3	7	0	0	10
Giants	0	3	0	10	13

at Yankee Stadium, New York

- Date: October 16
- Game weather: 64 °F (18 °C)
- Box Score

Game information

First quarter

- Washington – Charlie Gogolak 37-yard field goal, Redskins 3–0.

Second quarter

- Washington – Bobby Mitchell 7-yard pass from Sonny Jurgensen (Gogolak kick), Redskins 10–0.
- New York – Pete Gogolak 15-yard field goal, Redskins 10–3.

Third quarter

Fourth quarter

- New York – Pete Gogolak 18-yard field goal, Redskins 10–6.
- New York – Aaron Thomas 29-yard pass from Earl Morrall (Gogolak kick), Giants 13–10.

Top Passers

- Redskins – Sonny Jurgensen: 9/20, 125 yds, 1 TD, 2 INT
- Giants – Earl Morrall: 5/14, 139 yds, 1 TD, 1 INT

Top rushers

- Redskins – Steve Thurlow: 11 car, 44 yds.
- Giants – Chuck Mercein: 14 car, 37 yds,

Top receivers

- Redskins – Bobby Mitchell: 2 rec, 58 yds. 1 TD
- Giants – Homer Jones: 4 rec, 146 yds.

==== Week 7 vs Philadelphia Eagles ====
Week Seven: New York Giants (1–4–1) vs Philadelphia Eagles (3–3)

Quarter	1	2	3	4	Total
Eagles	0	24	0	7	31
Giants	3	0	0	0	3

at Yankee Stadium, New York City

- Date: October 23
- Game weather: 59 °F (15 °C)
- Box Score

Game information

First quarter

- New York – Pete Gogolak 29-yard field goal, Giants 3–0.

Second quarter

- Philadelphia – Pete Retzlaff 30-yard pass from Norm Snead (Baker kick), Eagles 7–3.
- Philadelphia – Sam Baker 15-yard field goal, Eagles 10–3.
- Philadelphia – Earl Gros 2-yard rush (Baker kick), Eagles 17–3.
- Philadelphia – Timmy Brown 18-yard pass from Norm Snead (Baker kick), Eagles 24–3.

Third quarter

Fourth quarter

- Philadelphia – Earl Gros 1-yard rush (Baker kick), Eagles 31–3.

Top Passers

- Eagles – Norm Snead: 8/13, 100 yds, 2 TD 1 INT
- Giants – Gary Wood: 10/21, 141 yds, 3 INT

Top rushers

- Eagles – Timmy Brown: 21 car, 100 yds
- Giants – Chuck Mercein: 9 car, 27 yds

Top receivers

- Eagles – Timmy Brown: 5 rec, 66 yds. 1 TD
- Giants – Homer Jones: 4 rec, 66 yds

==== Week 9 vs St. Louis Cardinals ====
Week Nine: New York Giants (1–5–1) at St. Louis Cardinals (6–1–1)

Quarter	1	2	3	4	Total
Cardinals	0	3	14	3	20
Giants	0	7	0	10	17

at Yankee Stadium, New York City

- Date: November 6
- Game weather: 48 °F (9 °C)
- Box Score

Game information

First quarter

Second quarter

- St. Louis – Jim Bakken 20-yard field goal, Cardinals 3–0.
- New York – Jerry Hillebrand 31-yard interception return (Pete Gogolak kick), Giants 7–3.

Third quarter

- St. Louis – Jackie Smith 69-yard pass from Charley Johnson (Bakken kick), Cardinals 10–7.
- St. Louis – Prentice Gautt 8-yard pass from Terry Nofsinger (Bakken kick), Cardinals 17–7.

Fourth quarter

- New York – Pete Gogolak 26-yard field goal, Cardinals 17–10.
- St. Louis – Jim Bakken 41-yard field goal, Cardinals 20–10.
- New York – Joe Morrison 7-yard pass from Gary Wood (Pete Gogolak kick), Cardinals 20–17.

Top Passers

- Cardinals – Charley Johnson: 7/19, 123 yds, 1 TD, 2 INT
- Giants – Gary Wood: 15/33, 216 yds, 1 TD, 1 INT

Top rushers

- Cardinals – Johnny Roland: 23 car, 76 yds.
- Giants – Chuck Mercein: 7 car, 15 yds,

Top receivers

- Cardinals – Jackie Smith: 3 rec, 103 yds 1 TD
- Giants – Joe Morrison: 5 rec, 95 yds 1 TD.

==== Week 10 at Los Angeles Rams ====
Week Ten: New York Giants (1–6–1) at Los Angeles Rams (4–5)

Quarter	1	2	3	4	Total
Giants	0	7	0	7	14
Rams	14	10	10	21	55

at Los Angeles Memorial Coliseum, Los Angeles

- Date: November 13
- Game weather: 62 °F (17 °C)
- Box Score

Game information

First quarter

- Los Angeles – Tom Moore 11-yard pass from Roman Gabriel (Gossett kick), Rams 7–0.
- Los Angeles – Roman Gabriel 1-yard rush (Gossett kick), Rams 14–0.

Second quarter

- New York – Henry Carr 101-yard interception return (Gogolak kick), Rams 14–7.
- Los Angeles – Bruce Gossett 12-yard field goal, Rams 17–7.
- Los Angeles – Roman Gabriel 1-yard rush (Gossett kick), Rams 24–7.

Third quarter

- Los Angeles – Bruce Gossett 15-yard field goal, Rams 27–7.
- Los Angeles – Irv Cross 60-yard interception return (Gossett kick, Rams 34–7.

Fourth quarter

- Los Angeles – Tom Moore 4-yard pass from Roman Gabriel (Gossett kick), Rams 41–7.
- New York – Joe Morrison 25-yard pass from Tom Kennedy (Gogolak kick), Rams 41–14.
- Los Angeles – Les Josephson 4-yard pass from Bill Munson (Gossett kick), Rams 48–14.
- Los Angeles – Bucky Pope 14-yard pass from Bill Munson (Gossett kick), Rams 55–14.

Top Passers

- Giants – Tom Kennedy: 8/18, 126 yds, 1 TD, 2 INT
- Rams – Roman Gabriel: 24/35, 298 yds, 2 TD, 1 INT

Top rushers

- Giants – Allen Jacobs: 5 car, 20 yds,
- Rams – Dick Bass: 19 car, 106 yds.

Top receivers

- Giants – Joe Morrison: 4 rec, 71 yds 1 TD
- Rams – Marlin McKeever: 7 rec, 115 yds

==== Week 11 vs Atlanta Falcons ====
Week Eleven: New York Giants (1–7–1) vs Atlanta Falcons (0–9)

Quarter	1	2	3	4	Total
Falcons	7	6	7	7	27
Giants	0	3	7	6	16

at Yankee Stadium, New York City

- Date: November 20
- Game weather: 36 °F (2 °C)
- Box Score

Game information

First quarter

- Atlanta – Ernie Wheelwright 9-yard pass from Randy Johnson (Kirouac kick), Falcons 7–0.

Second quarter

- New York – Pete Gogolak 24-yard field goal, Falcons 7–3.
- Atlanta – Vern Burke 8-yard pass from Randy Johnson, Falcons 13–3.

Third quarter

- Atlanta – Ernie Wheelwright 6-yard pass from Randy Johnson (Kirouac kick), Falcons 20–3.
- New York – Joe Morrison 25-yard pass from Tom Kennedy (Gogolak kick), Falcons 20–10.

Fourth quarter

- Atlanta – Randy Johnson 3-yard rush (Kirouac kick), Falcons 27–10.
- New York – Joe Morrison 12-yard rush, Falcons 27–16.

Top Passers

- Falcons – Randy Johnson 15/25, 177 yds, 3 TD, 1 INT
- Giants – Tom Kennedy: 18/33, 188 yds, 1 TD, 1 INT

Top rushers

- Falcons – Junior Coffey: 16 car, 64 yds.
- Giants – Joe Morrison: 17 car, 91 yds 1 TD

Top receivers

- Falcons – Ernie Wheelwright: 5 rec, 35 yds 2 TD
- Giants – Aaron Thomas: 5 rec, 83 yds

==== Week 12 at Washington Redskins ====
Week Twelve: New York Giants (1–8–1) at Washington Redskins (5–6)

Quarter	1	2	3	4	Total
Giants	0	14	14	13	41
Redskins	13	21	14	24	72

at D.C. Stadium, Washington D.C.

- Date: November 27
- Game weather: 42 °F (6 °C)
- Box Score

Game information

First quarter

- Washington – A.D. Whitfield 5-yard pass from Sonny Jurgensen, Redskins 6–0.
- Washington – A.D. Whitfield 63-yard rush (Gogolak kick), Redskins 13–0.

Second quarter

- Washington – Brig Owens 62-yard fumble return (Gogolak kick), Redskins 20–0.
- New York – Allen Jacobs 6-yard rush (Gogolak kick), Redskins 20–7.
- Washington – A.D. Whitfield 1-yard rush (Gogolak kick), Redskins 27–7.
- Washington – Joe Don Looney 9-yard rush (Gogolak kick), Redskins 34–7.
- New York – Gary Wood 1-yard rush (Gogolak kick), Redskins 34–14.

Third quarter

- New York – Jim Morrison 41-yard pass from Gary Wood (Gogolak kick), Redskins 34–21.
- Washington – Charley Taylor 32-yard pass from Sonny Jurgensen (Gogolak kick), Redskins 41–21.
- New York – Homer Jones 50-yard pass from Gary Wood (Gogolak kick), Redskins 41–28.
- Washington – Charley Taylor 74-yard pass from Sonny Jurgensen (Gogolak kick), Redskins 48–28.

Fourth quarter

- Washington – Rickie Harris 52-yard punt return (Gogolak kick), Redskins 55–28.
- Washington – Brig Owens 60-yard interception return (Gogolak kick), Redskins 62–28.
- New York – Aaron Thomas 18-yard pass from Tom Kennedy, Redskins 62–34.
- New York – Dan Lewis 1-yard rush (Gogolak kick), Redskins 62–41.
- Washington – Bobby Mitchell 45-yard rush (Gogolak kick), Redskins 69–41.
- Washington – Charlie Gogolak 29-yard field goal, Redskins 72–41.

Top Passers

- Giants – Tom Kennedy: 13/21, 165 yds, 1 TD, 3 INT
- Redskins – Sonny Jurgensen: 10/16, 145 yds, 3 TD

Top rushers

- Giants – Joe Morrison: 16 car, 59 yds,
- Redskins – A.D. Whitfield: 6 car, 74 yds. 2 TD

Top receivers

- Giants – Homer Jones: 6 rec, 85 yds.1TD
- Redskins – Charley Taylor: 6 rec, 124 yds. 2 TD

As of 2024, this game has the highest total number of points scored by both teams in an NFL game and is the only game with a final score of 72–41.

==== Week 13 at Cleveland Browns ====
Week Thirteen: New York Giants (1–9–1) at Cleveland Browns (7–4)

Quarter	1	2	3	4	Total
Giants	14	17	6	3	40
Browns	7	7	14	21	49

at Cleveland Stadium, Cleveland

- Date: December 4
- Game weather: 18 °F (−8 °C)
- Box Score

Game information

First quarter

- New York – Clarence Childs 90-yard kickoff return (Gogolak kick), Giants 7–0.
- New York – Gary Wood 5-yard rush (Gogolak kick), Giants 14–0.
- Cleveland – Leroy Kelly 1-yard rush (Groza kick), Giants 14–7.

Second quarter

- New York – Gary Wood 16-yard rush (Gogolak kick), Giants 21–7.
- Cleveland – Gary Collins 3-yard pass from Frank Ryan (Groza kick), Giants 21–14.
- New York – Joe Morrison 33-yard pass from Gary Wood (Gogolak kick), Giants 28–14.
- New York – Pete Gogolak 26-yard field goal, Giants 31–14.

Third quarter

- New York – Pete Gogolak 13-yard field goal, Giants 34–14.
- Cleveland – Leroy Kelly 3-yard rush (Groza kick), Giants 34–21.
- New York – Pete Gogolak 38-yard field goal, Giants 37–21.
- Cleveland – Leroy Kelly 2-yard rush (Groza kick), Giants 37–28.

Fourth quarter

- New York – Pete Gogolak 16-yard field goal, Giants 40–28.
- Cleveland – Ralph Smith 19-yard pass from Frank Ryan (Groza kick), Giants 40–35.
- Cleveland – Ernie Green 31-yard pass from Frank Ryan (Groza kick), Browns 42–40.
- Cleveland – Bill Glass 13-yard fumble return (Groza kick), Browns 49–40.

Top Passers

- Giants – Gary Wood: 9/18, 120 yds, 1 TD
- Browns – Frank Ryan: 16/27, 326 yds, 3 TD, 3 INT

Top rushers

- Giants – Allen Jacobs: 26 car, 94 yds
- Browns – Leroy Kelly: 13 car, 126 yds. 3 TD

Top receivers

- Giants – Joe Morrison: 5 rec, 75 yds. 1 TD
- Browns – Gary Collins: 5 rec, 120 yds. 1 TD

==== Week 14 vs Pittsburgh Steelers ====
Week Fourteen: New York Giants (1–10–1) vs. Pittsburgh Steelers (3–8–1)

Quarter	1	2	3	4	Total
Steelers	5	14	21	7	47
Giants	0	14	7	7	28

at Yankee Stadium, New York City

- Date: December 11
- Game weather: 54 °F (12 °C)
- Box Score

Game information

First quarter

- Pittsburgh – Safety, Spider Lockhart stepped out of endzone, Steelers 2–0.
- Pittsburgh – Mike Clark 12-yard field goal, Steelers 5–0.

Second quarter

- Pittsburgh – Amos Bullocks 13-yard pass from Bill Nelsen (Clark kick), Steelers 12–0.
- New York – Aaron Thomas 1-yard pass from Tom Kennedy (Gogolak kick), Steelers 12–7.
- Pittsburgh – Dick Leftridge 2-yard run (Clark kick), Steelers 19–7.
- New York – Homer Jones 82-yard pass from Tom Kennedy (Gogolak kick), Steelers 19–14.

Third quarter

- Pittsburgh – Willie Asbury 1-yard run (Clark kick), Steelers 26–14.
- Pittsburgh – Willie Asbury 1-yard run (Clark kick), Steelers 33–14.
- New York – Aaron Thomas 5-yard pass from Tom Kennedy (Gogolak kick), Steelers 33–21.
- Pittsburgh – Cannonball Butler 66-yard pass from Bill Nelsen (Clark kick), Steelers 40–21.

Fourth quarter

- Pittsburgh – Dick Leftridge 2-yard run (extra point pass successful), Steelers 47–21.
- New York – Bobby Crespino 16-yard pass from Tom Kennedy (Gogolak kick), Steelers 47–28.

Top Passers

- Steelers – Bill Nelsen: 17/31, 322 yds, 2 TD, 1 INT
- Giants– Tom Kennedy: 14/24, 229 yds, 4 TD

Top rushers

- Steelers – Willie Asbury: 9 car, 19 yds. 2 TD
- Giants – Allen Jacobs: 14 car, 60 yds

Top receivers

- Steelers – Cannonball Butler: 2 rec, 80 yds. 1 TD
- Giants – Homer Jones: 3 rec, 111 yds. 1 TD

==== Week 15 vs Dallas Cowboys ====
Week Fifteen: New York Giants (1–11–1) vs Dallas Cowboys (9–3–1)

Quarter	1	2	3	4	Total
Cowboys	7	0	0	10	17
Giants	0	0	0	7	7

at Yankee Stadium, New York City

- Date: December 18
- Game weather: 50 °F (10 °C)
- Box Score

Game information

First quarter

- Dallas – George Andrie 6-yard interception return (Villanueva kick), Cowboys 7–0.

Second quarter

Third quarter

Fourth quarter

- New York – Joe Morrison 1-yard rush (Gogolak kick), 7–7.
- Dallas – Bob Hayes 41-yard pass from Craig Morton (Villanueva kick), Cowboys 14–7.
- Dallas – Danny Villanueva 10-yard field goal, Cowboys 17–7.

Top Passers

- Cowboys – Craig Morton: 6/9, 88 yds, 1 TD
- Giants – Gary Wood: 14/28, 198 yds, 2 INT

Top rushers

- Cowboys – Don Perkins: 10 car, 41 yds
- Giants – Allen Jacobs: 11 car, 28 yds

Top receivers

- Cowboys – Bob Hayes: 7 rec, 99 yds,1 TD
- Giants – Joe Morrison: 6 rec, 131 yds

== Standings ==
NFL Eastern Conference
	W	L	T	PCT	CONF	PF	PA	STK
Dallas Cowboys	10	3	1	.769	9–3–1	445	239	W1
Cleveland Browns	9	5	0	.643	9–4	403	259	W1
Philadelphia Eagles	9	5	0	.643	8–5	326	340	W4
St. Louis Cardinals	8	5	1	.615	7–5–1	264	265	L3
Washington Redskins	7	7	0	.500	7–6	351	355	L1
Pittsburgh Steelers	5	8	1	.385	4–8–1	316	347	W2
Atlanta Falcons	3	11	0	.214	2–5	204	437	L1
New York Giants	1	12	1	.077	1–11–1	263	501	L8

Note: Tie games were not officially counted in the standings until 1972.

== Statistics ==
=== Team leaders ===
Category	Player(s)	Value	Rank
Passing yards	Gary Wood	1,142	15th
Passing touchdowns	Earl Morrall/Tom Kennedy	7	t12th
Rushing yards	Chuck Mercein	327	29th
Rushing touchdowns	Gary Wood	3	27th
Receiving yards	Homer Jones	1,044	4th
Receiving touchdowns	Homer Jones	8	t6th
Points	Pete Gogolak	77	17th
Kickoff return yards	Clarence Childs	855	3rd
Punt return yards	Spider Lockhart	113	10th
Interceptions	Spider Lockhart	6	t4th
Sacks	Jim Katcavage	6.5	t24th

Note that sack totals from 1960 to 1981 are considered unofficial by the NFL.

=== League rankings ===
Category	Total yards	Yards per game	NFL rank (out of 15)
Passing offense	2,475	176.8	9th
Rushing offense	1,457	104.1	12th
Total offense	3,932	280.8	9th
Passing defense	2,892	206.6	14th
Rushing defense	2,053	146.6	14th
Total defense	4,945	353.2	14th

== See also ==
- 1966 NFL season
