= 1966 Cleveland Browns season =

NFL team season

- General manager: Harold Sauerbrei
- Head coach: Blanton Collier
- Home stadium: Cleveland Stadium

Results
- Record: 9–5
- Division place: T–2nd NFL Eastern
- Playoffs: Did not qualify
- All-Pros: HB Leroy Kelly
- Pro Bowlers: LB Johnny Brewer; FL Gary Collins; FB Ernie Green; RG Gene Hickerson; HB Leroy Kelly; QB Frank Ryan; LT Dick Schafrath; LG John Wooten

The 1966 Cleveland Browns season was the team's 17th season with the National Football League. They finished just 9–5, their worst record since 1962, and failed to make the playoffs for the first time since 1963.

== Season summary ==
Save for a devastating 16–6 upset loss to a Pittsburgh Steelers team that would finish just 5–8–1, the Browns offense scored points in bunches. In later years, Browns players from that era said the 1966 team had the best offense—even better than the one in 1964, when the club won the NFL championship—and there's evidence to support that contention. The flurry of points started in the opener when the Browns blew out the Washington Redskins 38–14. It continued in a stretch of five straight games in which they lost 34–28 to the St. Louis Cardinals, beat the New York Giants 28–7, routed the Steelers 41–10, turned back the Dallas Cowboys 30–21 and crushed the expansion Atlanta Falcons 49–17.

Then, as they were finishing the season, the Browns outscored the Giants 49–40 and walloped the Cardinals 38–10.

The Browns scored 403 points in all, averaging a healthy 28.8 per contest. Even in the game that eventually did in their playoff chances—a 33–21 loss to the Philadelphia Eagles in the next-to-last week—they were able to score a decent number of points. Quarterback Frank Ryan was as good – or better – than he was in any of his previous three seasons as the full-time starter, including 1964, when he helped lead the Browns to the NFL championship. He threw for a career-high 2,974 yards and had better than a 2-to-1 ratio of touchdown passes (29) to interceptions (14). He also posted his second-best quarterback rating at 88.2.

=== NFL draft ===
The following were selected in the 1966 NFL draft.

1966 Cleveland Browns draft
Round	Selection	Player	Position	College	Notes
1	14	Milt Morin	Tight End	Massachusetts	
2	29	Rick Norton	Quarterback	Kentucky	
4	61	Pete Duranko	Defensive End	Notre Dame	
5	74	Randy Schultz	Running Back	Northern Iowa	
5	78	Dan Fulford	End	Auburn	
6	90	Jim Battle	Tackle	Saginaw Valley	
6	93	Fred Hoaglin	Center	Pittsburgh	
7	109	Leroy Carter	Flanker	Grambling	
8	123	Tom Talaga	End	Notre Dame	
9	139	Jack Gregory	Defensive End	Delta St.	
10	153	Monte Ledbetter	Wide Receiver	Northwestern St. (LA)	
11	169	Tony Fire	Tackle	Bowling Green	
11	183	Rich Czap	Tackle	Nebraska	
13	199	Jim Boudreaux	Tackle	Louisiana Tech	
14	213	Pete Lammons	Tight End	Texas	
15	229	Bob Ellis	Defensive End	Massachusetts	
16	243	David Ray	Kicker	Alabama	
17	259	Gene Modzelewski	Tackle	New Mexico St.	
18	273	Charley Harraway	Running Back	San Jose St.	
19	289	Karl Singer	Tackle	Purdue	
20	303	Joe Petro	Defensive Back	Temple	

== Exhibition schedule ==
Week	Date	Opponent	Result	Attendance
1	August 6	at Los Angeles Rams	L 6–16	63,285
2	August 14	at San Francisco 49ers	W 28–17	27,867
3	August 20	at Atlanta Falcons	W 42–3	48,548
4	August 26	Baltimore Colts	L 17–24	83,418
5	September 3	vs. Pittsburgh Steelers (at Birmingham)	W 13–10	23,590

There was a doubleheader on August 26, 1966 Redskins vs Vikings and Colts vs Browns.

== Regular season ==
=== Schedule ===
Week	Date	Opponent	Result	Record	Attendance
1	September 11	at Washington Redskins	W 38–14	1–0	48,643
2	September 18	Green Bay Packers	L 20–21	1–1	83,943
3	September 25	St. Louis Cardinals	L 28–34	1–2	74,814
4	October 2	at New York Giants	W 28–7	2–2	62,916
5	October 8	Pittsburgh Steelers	W 41–10	3–2	82,687
6	October 16	Bye			
7	October 23	Dallas Cowboys	W 30–21	4–2	84,721
8	October 30	at Atlanta Falcons	W 49–17	5–2	57,235
9	November 6	at Pittsburgh Steelers	L 6–16	5–3	39,690
10	November 13	Philadelphia Eagles	W 27–7	6–3	77,698
11	November 20	Washington Redskins	W 14–3	7–3	78,466
12	November 24	at Dallas Cowboys	L 14–26	7–4	75,504
13	December 4	New York Giants	W 49–40	8–4	61,651
14	December 11	at Philadelphia Eagles	L 21–33	8–5	58,074
15	December 17	at St. Louis Cardinals	W 38–10	9–5	47,721

- A bye week was necessary in 1966, as the league expanded to an odd-number (15) of teams (Atlanta); one team was idle each week.

=== Game summaries ===
==== Week 1 ====
Team	1	2	3	4	Total
• Browns	7	0	10	21	38
Redskins	14	0	0	0	14

- Date: September 11
- Location: D.C. Stadium, Washington, D.C.
- Game weather: 65 °F (18 °C); wind 8 mph

Scoring summary
Q1	WSH	Taylor 5 yard run (Gogolak kick)	WSH 7–0
Q1	WSH	Taylor 34 yard pass from Jurgensen (Gogolak kick)	WSH 14–0
Q1	CLE	Kelly 29 yard run (Groza kick)	WSH 14–7
Q3	CLE	Collins 20 yard pass from Ryan (Groza kick)	Tie 14–14
Q3	CLE	Groza 35 yard field goal	CLE 17–14
Q4	CLE	Warfield 16 yard pass from Ryan (Groza kick)	CLE 24–14
Q4	CLE	Green 1 yard run (Groza kick)	CLE 31–14
Q4	CLE	Collins 5 yard pass from Ryan (Groza kick)	CLE 38–14

==== Week 4 at New York Giants ====
Week Four: Cleveland Browns (1-2) at New York Giants (0-2-1)

Quarter	1	2	3	4	Total
Browns	7	7	0	14	28
Giants	0	7	0	0	7

at Yankee Stadium, New York City

- Date: October 2
- Game weather: 52 °F (11 °C)
- Box Score

Game information

First quarter

- Cleveland – Milt Morin 20-yard pass from Frank Ryan (Groza kick), Browns 7–0.

Second quarter

- Cleveland – Leroy Kelly 3-yard rush (Groza kick), Browns 14–0.
- New York– Homer Jones 17-yard pass from Gary Wood (Gogolak kick), Browns 14–7.

Third quarter

Fourth quarter

- Cleveland – Ernie Green 14-yard rush (Groza kick), Browns 21–7.
- Cleveland – Paul Warfield 9-yard pass from Frank Ryan (Groza kick), Browns 28–7.

Top Passers

- Browns – Frank Ryan: 14/24, 171 yds, 2 TD, 1 INT
- Giants – Earl Morrall: 10/23, 177 yds, 3 INT

Top rushers

- Browns – Leroy Kelly: 20 car, 138 yds. 1 TD
- Giants – Dan Lewis: 9 car, 24 yds,

Top receivers

- Browns – Gary Collins: 4 rec, 88 yds.
- Giants – Homer Jones: 4 rec, 88 yds. 1 TD

==== Week 6: at Atlanta Falcons ====
Week 6: Cleveland Browns at Atlanta Falcons – Game summary

Quarter	1	2	3	4	Total
Browns	14	7	7	21	49
Falcons	0	10	0	7	17

at Atlanta Stadium, Atlanta, GA

- Date: October 30
- Game time: 1:30 p.m. EST
- Game weather: 58 °F (14 °C), relative humidity 62%, round (wind) 10 mph
- Game attendance: 57,235
- TV announcers (CBS): Frank Glieber (play–by–play) and Warren Lahr (color commentator) (second half)

Game information

First Quarter

- CLE – Kelly 70 yard rush (Groza kick)
  Browns 7, Falcons 0
- CLE – Warfield 36 yard pass from Ryan (Groza kick)
  Browns 14, Falcons 0

Second Quarter

- ATL – Wheelwright 1 yard rush (Kirouac kick)
  Browns 14, Falcons 7
- CLE – Collins 17 yard pass from Ryan (Houston pass from Ninowski)
  Browns 21, Falcons 7
- ATL – Kirouac 23 yard field goal
  Browns 21, Falcons 10

Third Quarter

- CLE – Green 6 yard pass from Ryan (Groza kick)
  Browns 28, Falcons 10

Fourth Quarter

- CLE – Kelly 30 yard pass from Ryan (Groza kick)
  Browns 35, Falcons 10
- ATL – Hawkins 22 yard pass from Johnson (Kirouac kick)
  Browns 35, Falcons 17
- CLE – McNeil 44 yard pass from Ninowski (Groza kick)
  Browns 42, Falcons 17
- CLE – Smith 15 yard pass from Ninowski (Groza kick)
  Browns 49, Falcons 17

Top passers

- CLE – Frank Ryan 13/21, 223 yds, 4 TD, 1 INT
- ATL – Randy Johnson 14/25, 158 yds, 1 TD, 1 INT

Top rushers

- CLE – Leroy Kelly 14 carr, 98 yds, 1 TD
- ATL – Junior Coffey 17 carr, 117 yds

Top receivers

- CLE – Gary Collins 4 rec, 48 yds, 1 TD
- ATL – Vern Burke 5 rec, 60 yds

Turnovers

- CLE – 1
- ATL – 3

==== Week 9 at Pittsburgh Steelers ====
Week Nine: Cleveland Browns (5–2) at Pittsburgh Steelers (1–5–1)

Quarter	1	2	3	4	Total
Browns	0	6	0	0	6
Steelers	0	3	3	10	16

at Pitt Stadium, Pittsburgh, Pennsylvania

- Date: November 6
- Game weather: 35 °F (2 °C)
- Game attendance: 36,690
- Box Score

Team	Category	Player	Statistics
Browns	Passing	Frank Ryan	19/37, 228 Yds, TD, 5 INT
Browns	Rushing	Leroy Kelly	19 Rush, 82 Yds
Browns	Receiving	Gary Collins	7 Rec, 93 Yds, TD
Steelers	Passing	Ron Smith	11/19, 151 Yds, TD
Steelers	Rushing	Willie Asbury	17 Rush, 94 Yds
Steelers	Receiving	Gary Ballman	7 Rec, 88 Yds, TD

Scoring summary

Quarter	Time	Drive			Team	Scoring information	Score	
Quarter	Time	Plays	Yards	TOP	Team	Scoring information	CLE	PIT
2					Browns	Gary Collins 24-yard touchdown reception from Frank Ryan, kick no good	6	0
2					Steelers	28-yard field goal by Mike Clark	6	3
2					Steelers	25-yard field goal by Mike Clark	6	6
3					Steelers	Gary Ballman 8-yard touchdown reception from Ron Smith, Mike Clark kick good	6	13
4					Steelers	42-yard field goal by Mike Clark	6	16
"TOP" = time of possession. For other American football terms, see Glossary of American football.							6	16

==== Week 12 at Cowboys ====
Week Twelve: Cleveland Browns (7–3) at Dallas Cowboys (7–2–1)

Quarter	1	2	3	4	Total
Browns	0	14	0	0	14
Cowboys	6	7	6	7	26

at Cotton Bowl, Dallas, Texas

- Date: November 24
- Game attendance: 80,259
- Box Score

Game information

First quarter

- DAL – Danny Villanueva 11-yard field goal. Cowboys 3-0. Drive:
- DAL – Danny Villanueva 31-yard field goal. Cowboys 6-0. Drive:

Second quarter

- CLE – Leroy Kelly 1-yard run (Lou Groza kick). Browns 7-6. Drive:
- DAL – Dan Reeves 6-yard pass from Don Meredith (Danny Villanueva kick). Cowboys 13-7. Drive:
- CLE – Ernie Green 16-yard pass from Frank Ryan (Lou Groza kick). Browns 14-13. Drive:

Third quarter

- DAL – Danny Villanueva 12-yard field goal. Cowboys 16-14. Drive:
- DAL – Danny Villanueva 13-yard field goal. Cowboys 19-14. Drive:

Fourth quarter

- DAL – Don Perkins 9-yard run (Danny Villanueva kick). Cowboys 26-14. Drive:

Top passers

- CLE – Frank Ryan – 12/26, 190 yards, TD
- DAL – Don Meredith – 16/24, 131 yards, TD

Top rushers

- CLE – Leroy Kelly – 15 rushes, 115 yards, TD
- DAL – Don Perkins – 23 rushes, 111 yards, TD

Receiving

- CLE – Gary Collins – 5 receptions, 92 yards
- DAL – Bob Hayes – 6 receptions, 54 yards

==== Week 13 vs New York Giants ====
Week Thirteen: Cleveland Browns (7-4) vs New York Giants (1-9-1)

Quarter	1	2	3	4	Total
Giants	14	17	6	3	40
Browns	7	7	14	21	49

at Cleveland Stadium, Cleveland

- Date: December 4
- Game weather: 18 °F (−8 °C)
- Box Score

Game information

First quarter

- New York – Clarence Childs 90-yard kickoff return (Gogolak kick), Giants 7–0.
- New York – Gary Wood 5-yard rush (Gogolak kick), Giants 14–0.
- Cleveland – Leroy Kelly 1-yard rush (Groza kick), Giants 14–7.

Second quarter

- New York – Gary Wood 16-yard rush (Gogolak kick), Giants 21–7.
- Cleveland – Gary Collins 3-yard pass from Frank Ryan (Groza kick), Giants 21–14.
- New York – Joe Morrison 33-yard pass from Gary Wood (Gogolak kick), Giants 28–14.
- New York – Pete Gogolak 26-yard field goal, Giants 31–14.

Third quarter

- New York – Pete Gogolak 13-yard field goal, Giants 34–14.
- Cleveland – Leroy Kelly 3-yard rush (Groza kick), Giants 34–21.
- New York – Pete Gogolak 38-yard field goal, Giants 37–21.
- Cleveland – Leroy Kelly 2-yard rush (Groza kick), Giants 37–28.

Fourth quarter

- New York – Pete Gogolak 16-yard field goal, Giants 40–28.
- Cleveland – Ralph Smith 19-yard pass from Frank Ryan (Groza kick), Giants 40–35.
- Cleveland – Ernie Green 31-yard pass from Frank Ryan (Groza kick), Browns 42–40.
- Cleveland – Bill Glass 13-yard fumble return (Groza kick), Browns 49–40.

Top Passers

- Giants – Gary Wood: 9/18, 120 yds, 1 TD
- Browns – Frank Ryan: 16/27, 326 yds, 3 TD, 3 INT

Top rushers

- Giants – Allen Jacobs: 26 car, 94 yds
- Browns – Leroy Kelly: 13 car, 126 yds. 3 TD

Top receivers

- Giants – Joe Morrison: 5 rec, 75 yds. 1 TD
- Browns – Gary Collins: 5 rec, 120 yds. 1 TD

== Standings ==
NFL Eastern Conference
	W	L	T	PCT	CONF	PF	PA	STK
Dallas Cowboys	10	3	1	.769	9–3–1	445	239	W1
Cleveland Browns	9	5	0	.643	9–4	403	259	W1
Philadelphia Eagles	9	5	0	.643	8–5	326	340	W4
St. Louis Cardinals	8	5	1	.615	7–5–1	264	265	L3
Washington Redskins	7	7	0	.500	7–6	351	355	L1
Pittsburgh Steelers	5	8	1	.385	4–8–1	316	347	W2
Atlanta Falcons	3	11	0	.214	2–5	204	437	L1
New York Giants	1	12	1	.077	1–11–1	263	501	L8

Note: Tie games were not officially counted in the standings until 1972.

== Personnel ==
=== Roster ===
1966 Cleveland Browns roster
Quarterbacks: 11 Jim Ninowski; 13 Frank Ryan; 15 Gary Lane; Running backs: 31 Charley Harraway; 33 Randy Schultz; 36 Nick Pietrosante; 44 Leroy Kelly; 48 Ernie Green; Wide receivers: 27 Walter Roberts; 42 Paul Warfield; 85 Clifton McNeil; 86 Gary Collins P; Tight ends: 41 Ralph Smith; 89 Milt Morin	Offensive linemen: 54 Fred Hoaglin C; 60 John Wooten G; 61 Joe Isbell G; 66 Gene Hickerson G; 70 John Brown T; 73 Monte Clark T; 77 Dick Schafrath T; Defensive linemen: 69 Jim Kanicki DT; 71 Walter Johnson DT; 74 Dick Modzelewski DT; 78 Frank Parker DT; 79 Jim Battle DE; 80 Bill Glass DE; 84 Paul Wiggin DE	Linebackers: 35 Galen Fiss OLB; 50 Vince Costello MLB; 51 Dale Lindsey MLB; 67 Sid Williams OLB; 82 Jim Houston OLB; 83 Johnny Brewer OLB; Defensive backs: 20 Ross Fichtner SS; 22 Bobby Franklin CB/S; 24 Ernie Kellermann FS; 34 Mike Howell CB; 40 Erich Barnes CB; Special teams: 76 Lou Groza K	Taxi squad: 23 Olie Cordill S; 16 Archie Roberts QB; Reserve list: 49 Walter Beach CB (IR); 56 John Morrow C (IR); rookies in italics

=== Staff/coaches ===
1966 Cleveland Browns staff
Front office: Majority owner/CEO & president – Art Modell; Minority owner – Al Lerner; General manager – Harold Sauerbrei; Coaches: Head coach – Blanton Collier; Offensive coaches: Quarterbacks/Running Backs - Dub Jones; Offensive guards – Fritz Heisler; Offensive tackles – Ed Ulinski; Offensive backfield and ends – Bob Nussbaumer	Defensive coaches: Defensive line – Nick Skorich; Linebackers – Ed Ulinski; Strength & conditioning: Athletic Trainer - Leo Murphy; Equipment Manager - Morris Kono
