= 1966 Philadelphia Eagles season =

NFL team season

- Owner: Jerry Wolman
- Head coach: Joe Kuharich
- Home stadium: Franklin Field

Results
- Record: 9–5
- Division place: T–2nd NFL Eastern
- Playoffs: Lost NFL Playoff Bowl (vs. Colts) 14–20
- All-Pros: RT Bob Brown
- Pro Bowlers: RT Bob Brown; DT Floyd Peters

The 1966 Philadelphia Eagles season was the franchise's 34th season in the National Football League. The team finished with 9 wins and 5 losses and qualified for the NFL Playoff Bowl. In that game the Eagles lost to the Baltimore Colts 20–14.

== Off season ==
=== NFL draft ===
The 1966 NFL draft was held on November 27, 1965, the last year in which the NFL and the AFL had separate drafts. As a result, many players selected by teams from both leagues would choose to play for the more established NFL, or in a rarer case, the AFL. The expansion Atlanta Falcons were awarded the first pick in the draft as well as the final pick in each of the first five rounds. The league also provided the Falcons with an expansion draft six weeks later, selecting players from NFL rosters.

=== Player selections ===
= Pro Bowler	= AFL All-Star	= Hall of Famer

Rd	PICK	PLAYER	POS	SCHOOL	AFL	Rd	Pick	Signed
1	4	Randy Beisler	Defensive End	Indiana				
2	20	Gary Pettigrew	Defensive end	Stanford	San Diego	6	49	Eagles
3	36	Ben Hawkins	Wide receiver	Arizona State	New York	5	38	Eagles
4	52	Frank Emanuel	Linebacker	Tennessee	Miami	2	9	Miami
5	68	Dan Berry	Running back	California				
6	84	Bob Sherlag	Defensive back	Memphis State				
6	89	Mel Tom	Linebacker	San Jose State				
7	99	David Lince	Tackle	North Dakota	Houston	14	122	Eagles
8	114	John Mason	End	Stanford				
9	129	Jim Todd	Running back	Ball State				
10	144	John Osmond	Center	Tulsa	Kansas City	6	47	
11	159	Welford Walton	Defensive end	Nevada-Reno				
12	174	Bruce Van Dyke	Guard	Missouri	Kansas City	15	133	Eagles
13	189	Jim Bohl	Running back	New Mexico State				
14	204	Ron Medved	Running back	Washington				
15	219	Harry Day	Tackle	Memphis State	Houston	12	104	
16	234	Arunas Vasys	Linebacker	Notre Dame				
17	249	Ike Kelley	Linebacker	Ohio State				
18	264	Bill Moorer	Center	Georgia Tech				
19	279	Taft Reed	Defensive back	Jackson State	San Diego	9	81	Eagles
20	294	Bill Risio	Tackle	Boston College				
20	298	Gerald Circo	Kicker	Cal State-Chico				

=== Undrafted free agents ===
1966 undrafted free agents of note
Player	Position	College
Bob Miller	Quarterback	Sacramento State
Ken Woodeshick	Guard	West Virginia

== Personnel ==
=== Staff / Coaches ===
1966 Philadelphia Eagles staff
Front office: Principal / Majority Owner – Jerry Wolman; General manager – Joe Kuharich (de facto); Head coaches: Head coach - Joe Kuharich; Offensive coaches: Offensive Coordinator / Receivers - Herman Ball; Offensive Assistant - Mike Nixon; Offensive Line – Dick Stanfel	Defensive coaches: Defensive Coordinator - Dick Evans; Defensive Backs / Secondary – Fred Bruney

=== Roster ===
1966 Philadelphia Eagles roster
Quarterbacks (QB): 3 Jack Concannon; 10 King Hill P; 16 Norm Snead; Running backs (RB): 22 Timmy Brown; 38 Earl Gros; 29 Izzy Lang; 33 Ollie Matson; 37 Tom Woodeshick; Wide receivers (WR): 81 Ron Goodwin; 18 Ben Hawkins; 86 Fred Hill; 27 T. J. Jackson; Tight ends (TE): 86 Dave Lince; 44 Pete Retzlaff	Offensive linemen (OL): 64 Ed Blaine G; 76 Bob Brown T; 78 Dave Graham T; 79 Lane Howell T; 63 Lynn Hoyem G; 50 Dave Recher C; 54 Jim Ringo C; 77 Ray Rissmiller T; 70 Jim Skaggs G; 66 Bruce Van Dyke G; Defensive linemen (DL): 80 Randy Beisler DE; 58 Dave Cahill DT; 83 Don Hultz DE; 75 John Meyers DT; 72 Floyd Peters DT; 88 Gary Pettigrew DE	Linebackers (LB): 51 Ike Kelley OLB; 52 Dave Lloyd MLB; 53 Harold Wells OLB; 61 Arunas Vasys MLB; 56 Fred Whittingham OLB; Defensive backs (DB): 42 Aaron Martin CB; 45 Ron Medved SS; 26 Al Nelson CB; 9 Jim Nettles CB; 24 Nate Ramsey SS; 21 Joe Scarpati FS; Special teams (ST): 38 Sam Baker K/P	Practice squad: 71 Dick Hart G; 17 Taft Reed CB; Reserve: 55 Fred Brown LB (IR); 74 Frank Molden DT (IR); 89 Mike Morgan LB (IR); 35 Ray Poage WR (IR); Rookies in italics

== Regular season ==
=== Schedule ===
Week	Date	Opponent	Result	Record	Venue	Attendance
1	September 11	at **St. Louis Cardinals**	**L** 13–16	0–1	Busch Memorial Stadium	39,066
2	September 18	**Atlanta Falcons**	**W** 23–10	1–1	Franklin Field	54,049
3	September 25	**New York Giants**	**W** 35–17	2–1	Franklin Field	60,177
4	October 2	**St. Louis Cardinals**	**L** 10–41	2–2	Franklin Field	59,305
5	October 9	at **Dallas Cowboys**	**L** 7–56	2–3	Cotton Bowl	69,372
6	October 16	at **Pittsburgh Steelers**	**W** 31–14	3–3	Pitt Stadium	28,233
7	October 23	at **New York Giants**	**W** 31–3	4–3	Yankee Stadium	63,018
8	October 30	**Washington Redskins**	**L** 13–27	4–4	Franklin Field	60,652
9	November 6	**Dallas Cowboys**	**W** 24–23	5–4	Franklin Field	60,658
10	November 13	at **Cleveland Browns**	**L** 7–27	5–5	Cleveland Municipal Stadium	77,968
11	November 20	at San Francisco 49ers	**W** 35–34	6–5	Kezar Stadium	31,993
12	Bye					
13	December 4	**Pittsburgh Steelers**	**W** 27–23	7–5	Franklin Field	54,275
14	December 11	**Cleveland Browns**	**W** 33–21	8–5	Franklin Field	58,074
15	December 18	at **Washington Redskins**	**W** 37–28	9–5	D.C. Stadium	50,405
Note: Intra-conference opponents are in **bold** text.

=== Game summaries ===
==== Week 3 vs New York Giants ====
Week Three: New York Giants (0-1-1) at Philadelphia Eagles (1-1)

Quarter	1	2	3	4	Total
Giants	0	3	7	7	**17**
Eagles	7	14	7	7	**35**

at Franklin Field, Philadelphia

- Date: September 25
- Game weather: 55 °F (13 °C)
- Box Score

Game information

**First quarter**

- Philadelphia – Timmy Brown 1-yard rush (Baker kick), Eagles 7–0.

**Second quarter**

- Philadelphia – Timmy Brown 7-yard pass from Norm Snead (Baker kick), Eagles 14–0.
- Philadelphia – Pete Retzlaff 37-yard pass from Norm Snead (Baker kick), Eagles 21–0.
- New York – Pete Gogolak 18-yard field goal. Eagles 21–3.

**Third quarter**

- New York– Homer Jones 34-yard pass from Earl Morrall (Gogolak kick), Eagles 21–10.
- Philadelphia – Earl Gros 30-yard pass from Norm Snead (Baker kick), Eagles 28–10.

**Fourth quarter**

- Philadelphia – Earl Gros 1-yard rush (Baker kick), Eagles 35 – 10.
- New York – Joe Morrison 8-yard pass from Gary Wood (Gogolak kick), Eagles 35 – 17.

**Top Passers**

- Giants – Earl Morrall: 14/25, 181 yds, 1 TD, 1 INT
- Eagles – Norm Snead: 10/18, 179 yds, 3 TD

**Top rushers**

- Giants – Chuck Mercein: 18 car, 82 yds
- Eagles – Timmy Brown: 16 car, 40 yds, 1 TD

**Top receivers**

- Giants – Homer Jones: 5 rec, 95 yds. 1 TD
- Eagles – Pete Retzlaff: 5 rec, 120 yds. 1 TD

==== Week 7 at New York Giants ====
Week Seven: Philadelphia Eagles (3-3) at New York Giants (1-4-1)

Quarter	1	2	3	4	Total
Eagles	0	24	0	7	**31**
Giants	3	0	0	0	**3**

at Yankee Stadium, New York City

- Date: October 23
- Game weather: 59 °F (15 °C)
- Box Score

Game information

**First quarter**

- New York – Pete Gogolak 29-yard field goal, Giants 3–0.

**Second quarter**

- Philadelphia – Pete Retzlaff 30-yard pass from Norm Snead (Baker kick), Eagles 7–3.
- Philadelphia – Sam Baker 15-yard field goal, Eagles 10–3.
- Philadelphia – Earl Gros 2-yard rush (Baker kick), Eagles 17–3.
- Philadelphia – Timmy Brown 18-yard pass from Norm Snead (Baker kick), Eagles 24–3.

**Third quarter**

**Fourth quarter**

- Philadelphia – Earl Gros 1-yard rush (Baker kick), Eagles 31–3.

**Top Passers**

- Giants – Gary Wood: 10/21, 141 yds, 3 INT
- Eagles – Norm Snead: 8/13, 100 yds, 2 TD 1 INT

**Top rushers**

- Giants – Chuck Mercein: 9 car, 27 yds
- Eagles – Timmy Brown: 21 car, 100 yds

**Top receivers**

- Giants – Homer Jones: 4 rec, 66 yds
- Eagles – Timmy Brown: 5 rec, 66 yds. 1 TD

== Standings ==
NFL Eastern Conference
	W	L	T	PCT	CONF	PF	PA	STK
Dallas Cowboys	10	3	1	.769	9–3–1	445	239	W1
Cleveland Browns	9	5	0	.643	9–4	403	259	W1
Philadelphia Eagles	9	5	0	.643	8–5	326	340	W4
St. Louis Cardinals	8	5	1	.615	7–5–1	264	265	L3
Washington Redskins	7	7	0	.500	7–6	351	355	L1
Pittsburgh Steelers	5	8	1	.385	4–8–1	316	347	W2
Atlanta Falcons	3	11	0	.214	2–5	204	437	L1
New York Giants	1	12	1	.077	1–11–1	263	501	L8

Note: Tie games were not officially counted in the standings until 1972.

=== Playoff Bowl ===
Round	Date	Opponent	Result	Record	Venue	Attendance
Playoff Bowl	January 8, 1967	Baltimore Colts	L 14–20	0–1	Orange Bowl	58,088

== Awards and honors ==
Pro Bowl Selections

Bob Brown selected starting Tackle.
Floyd Peters is selected as Defensive Tackle

League leaders

Tim Browns leads league in Kickoff Returns for TDs with 2.
Tim Browns finishes 3 rd in Kick return Avg. with 28.1
Joe Scarpati finishes 2nd in Interception with 8.
