= 1966 St. Louis Cardinals (NFL) season =

American football team season

1966 St. Louis Cardinals season
- Head coach: Charley Winner
- Home stadium: Busch Memorial Stadium

Results
- Record: 8–5–1
- Division place: 4th NFL Eastern
- Playoffs: Did not qualify
- All-Pros: FS Larry Wilson
- Pro Bowlers: RG Ken Gray, LT Bob Reynolds, DE Joe Robb, HB Johnny Roland, TE Jackie Smith, SS Jerry Stovall, DT Chuck Walker, FS Larry Wilson

The 1966 St. Louis Cardinals season was the 47th season the team was in the National Football League (NFL), and the seventh in St. Louis. The team moved its home games from the old Busch Stadium to the new Busch Stadium in downtown St. Louis, and bettered their 1965 record of 5–9, winning eight games. Despite the improvement, they failed to qualify for the playoffs for the 18th consecutive season.

== NFL draft ==
1966 St. Louis Cardinals draft
Round	Pick	Player	Position	College	Notes
1	8	Carl McAdams	DT	Oklahoma	
2	23	Harold Lucas	T	Michigan State	
3	43	Dave Long	DE	Iowa	
4	58	Gary Snook	QB	Iowa	
5	73	Jack Clancy *	SE	Michigan	
6	88	Tim Van Galder	QB	Iowa State	later played for the Cardinals from 1967, 1971–72
7	102	Charley Arkwright	T	Georgia	
8	121	Dan Goich	DT	California	
9	135	Charlie Bryant	RB	Allen	
10	149	Mike Ringer	HB	Oklahoma	
11	163	Bobby Williams	DB	Central State (OK)	
12	177	Rickey Johnson	T	Clemson	
13	196	Jim Brown	G	Nebraska	
14	210	LaVerle Pratt	LB	Idaho	
15	224	Darryl Alleman	E	Wyoming	
16	238	Dick Kasperek	C	Iowa State	
17	252	Benny Russell	QB	Louisville	
18	271	Willie Jones	DT	Kansas State	
19	285	Tony Golmont	DB	NC State	
20	299	Tom Gallagher	DE	Indiana	
Made roster † Pro Football Hall of Fame * Made at least one Pro Bowl during career

=== Undrafted free agents ===
1966 undrafted free agents of note
Player	Position	College
Ron Snyder	Linebacker	Missouri

== Personnel ==
=== Staff / Coaches ===
1966 St. Louis Cardinals staff
Front office: Principal Owner/de facto General Manager - Bill Bidwill; Partial Owner / Team President - Charles Bidwill Jr.; Head coaches: Head Coach – Charley Winner; Assistant Coach / Talent Scout - Abe Stuber; Offensive coaches: Quarterbacks Coach - Harry Gilmer; Offensive Backs / Game Scouting - Rick Forzano; Offensive line – Red Miller; Receivers Coach – Fran Polsfoot	Defensive coaches: Defensive Coordinator - Chuck Drulis; Linebackers Coach – Don Shroyer; Defensive Line – Jim Champion; Defensive Backs - Chuck Drulis

=== Roster ===
1966 St. Louis Cardinals roster
Quarterbacks: 7 Jim Hart; 18 Terry Nofsinger; Running backs: 33 Willis Crenshaw; 23 Johnny Roland; 30 Charlie Bryant; 22 Prentice Gautt; 27 Roy Shivers; Wide receivers: 40 Bobby Joe Conrad; 3 Billy Gambrell; 28 Ray Ogden; 88 Sonny Randle; Tight ends: 31 Mal Hammack; 81 Jackie Smith P	Offensive linemen: 55 Irv Goode G/C; 64 Ken Gray G; 51 Dick Kasperek C; 73 Ernie McMillan T; 52 Dave O'Brien G/T; 74 Bob Reynolds T; 68 Frank Roy G; 66 Rick Sortun G; Defensive linemen: 83 Don Brumm DE; 74 Fred Heron DE/DT; 89 Dave Long DT; 82 Mike Melinkovich DE; 84 Joe Robb DE; 72 Sam Silas DT; 79 Chuck Walker DT	Linebackers: 34 Bill Koman OLB; 60 Dave Meggyesy OLB; 62 Dale Meinert MLB; 67 Larry Stallings OLB; 57 Mike Strofolino MLB; Defensive backs: 37 Pat Fischer CB; 26 Jimmy Heidel FS; 21 Jerry Stovall SS; 45 Bobby Williams CB; 8 Larry Wilson FS; 42 Abe Woodson CB; Special teams: 25 Jim Bakken K/P	Reserve lists: 49 Jimmy Burson CB (IR); 61 Bob DeMarco C (IR); 12 Charley Johnson QB (IR); 76 John McDowell T (IR); 53 Dave Simmons LB (IR); -- Gary Snook QB (Military); 36 Bill Thornton RB (IR); 63 Herschel Turner T (IR); Taxi squad: -- Jerry Jones T; 83 Chuck Logan TE; -- Buddy Owens G; 38 Bill Triplett RB; rookies in italics

== Regular season ==
=== Schedule ===
Week	Date	Opponent	Result	Record	Venue	Attendance	Recap
1	September 11	**Philadelphia Eagles**	**W** 16–13	1–0	Busch Memorial Stadium	39,065	Recap
2	September 18	**Washington Redskins**	**W** 23–7	2–0	Busch Memorial Stadium	40,198	Recap
3	September 25	at **Cleveland Browns**	**W** 34–28	3–0	Cleveland Municipal Stadium	74,814	Recap
4	October 2	at **Philadelphia Eagles**	**W** 41–10	4–0	Franklin Field	59,305	Recap
5	October 9	**New York Giants**	**W** 24–19	5–0	Busch Memorial Stadium	43,893	Recap
6	October 16	**Dallas Cowboys**	**T** 10–10	5–0–1	Busch Memorial Stadium	50,673	Recap
7	October 23	at **Washington Redskins**	**L** 20–26	5–1–1	D.C. Stadium	50,154	Recap
8	October 31	Chicago Bears	**W** 24–17	6–1–1	Busch Memorial Stadium	49,516	Recap
9	November 6	at **New York Giants**	**W** 20–17	7–1–1	Yankee Stadium	62,967	Recap
10	November 13	at **Pittsburgh Steelers**	**L** 9–30	7–2–1	Pitt Stadium	28,552	Recap
11	Bye						
12	November 27	**Pittsburgh Steelers**	**W** 6–3	8–2–1	Busch Memorial Stadium	46,099	Recap
13	December 4	at **Dallas Cowboys**	**L** 31–34	8–3–1	Cotton Bowl	76,965	Recap
14	December 11	at **Atlanta Falcons**	**L** 10–16	8–4–1	Atlanta Stadium	57,169	Recap
15	December 17	**Cleveland Browns**	**L** 10–38	8–5–1	Busch Memorial Stadium	47,721	Recap
Note: Intra-conference opponents are in **bold** text.

=== Game summaries ===
==== Week 1 ====
Team	1	2	3	4	Total
Eagles	3	7	0	3	13
• Cardinals	0	3	3	10	16

- Date: September 11
- Location: Civic Center Busch Memorial Stadium, St. Louis, MO
- Game weather: 72 °F (22 °C); wind 5 mph (8 km/h)

Scoring summary
Q1	PHI	Baker 23 yard field goal	PHI 3–0
Q2	STL	Bakken 9 yard field goal	Tie 3–3
Q2	PHI	Brown 23 yard run (Baker kick)	PHI 10–3
Q3	STL	Bakken 47 yard field goal	PHI 10–6
Q4	STL	Johnson 1 yard run (Bakken kick)	STL 13–10
Q4	PHI	Baker 33 yard field goal	Tie 13–13
Q4	STL	Bakken 27 yard field goal	STL 16–13

==== Week 5 vs New York Giants ====
Week Five: New York Giants (0-3-1) at St. Louis Cardinals (4-0)

Quarter	1	2	3	4	Total
Giants	10	3	0	6	**19**
Cardinals	0	0	7	17	**24**

at Busch Memorial Stadium, St. Louis

- Date: October 9
- Game weather: 64 °F (18 °C)
- Box Score

Game information

**First quarter**

- New York – Pete Gogolak 32-yard field goal. Giants 7–0.
- New York– Homer Jones 9-yard pass from Earl Morrall (Gogolak kick), Giants 10–0.

**Second quarter**

- New York – Pete Gogolak 37-yard field goal, Giants 13–0.

**Third quarter**

- St. Louis – Johnny Roland 2-yard rush (Bakken kick), Giants 13–7.

**Fourth quarter**

- New York – Pete Gogolak 47-yard field goal, Giants 16–7.
- St. Louis – Bobby Joe Conrad 40-yard pass from Johnny Roland (Bakken kick), Giants 16–14.
- New York – Pete Gogolak 47-yard field goal, Giants 19–14.
- St. Louis – Billy Gambrell 30-yard pass from Charley Johnson (Bakken kick), Cardinals 21–19.
- St. Louis – Jim Bakken 36-yard field goal, Cardinals 24–19.

**Top Passers**

- Giants – Earl Morrall: 19/35, 162 yds, 1 TD, 2 INT
- Cardinals – Charley Johnson: 8/17, 139 yds, 1 TD, 2 INT

**Top rushers**

- Giants – Ernie Koy Jr.: 22 car, 81 yds,
- Cardinals – Johnny Roland: 19 car, 60 yds. 1 TD

**Top receivers**

- Giants – Aaron Thomas: 8 rec, 86 yds.
- Cardinals – Jackie Smith: 3 rec, 49 yds.

==== Week 9 at New York Giants ====
Week Nine: St. Louis Cardinals (6-1-1) at New York Giants (1-5-1)

Quarter	1	2	3	4	Total
Cardinals	0	3	14	3	**20**
Giants	0	7	0	10	**17**

at Yankee Stadium, New York City

- Date: November 6
- Game weather: 48 °F (9 °C)
- Box Score

Game information

**First quarter**

**Second quarter**

- St. Louis – Jim Bakken 20-yard field goal, Cardinals 3–0.
- New York – Jerry Hillebrand 31-yard interception return (Pete Gogolak kick), Giants 7–3.

**Third quarter**

- St. Louis – Jackie Smith 69-yard pass from Charley Johnson (Bakken kick), Cardinals 10–7.
- St. Louis – Prentice Gautt 8-yard pass from Terry Nofsinger (Bakken kick), Cardinals 17–7.

**Fourth quarter**

- New York – Pete Gogolak 26-yard field goal, Cardinals 17–10.
- St. Louis – Jim Bakken 41-yard field goal, Cardinals 20–10.
- New York – Joe Morrison 7-yard pass from Gary Wood (Pete Gogolak kick), Cardinals 20–17.

**Top Passers**

- Cardinals – Charley Johnson: 7/19, 123 yds, 1 TD, 2 INT
- Giants – Gary Wood: 15/33, 216 yds, 1 TD, 1 INT

**Top rushers**

- Cardinals – Johnny Roland: 23 car, 76 yds.
- Giants – Chuck Mercein: 7 car, 15 yds,

**Top receivers**

- Cardinals – Jackie Smith: 3 rec, 103 yds 1 TD
- Giants – Joe Morrison: 5 rec, 95 yds 1 TD.

== Standings ==
NFL Eastern Conference
	W	L	T	PCT	CONF	PF	PA	STK
Dallas Cowboys	10	3	1	.769	9–3–1	445	239	W1
Cleveland Browns	9	5	0	.643	9–4	403	259	W1
Philadelphia Eagles	9	5	0	.643	8–5	326	340	W4
St. Louis Cardinals	8	5	1	.615	7–5–1	264	265	L3
Washington Redskins	7	7	0	.500	7–6	351	355	L1
Pittsburgh Steelers	5	8	1	.385	4–8–1	316	347	W2
Atlanta Falcons	3	11	0	.214	2–5	204	437	L1
New York Giants	1	12	1	.077	1–11–1	263	501	L8

Note: Tie games were not officially counted in the standings until 1972.
