= Carl "Spider" Lockhart =

American football player (1943–1986)

Spider Lockhart
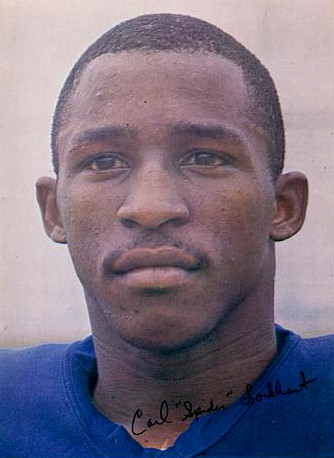
- Lockhart in 1965

No. 43
- Position: Safety

Personal information
- Born: April 6, 1943; Dallas, Texas, U.S.
- Died: July 9, 1986 (aged 43); Hackensack, New Jersey, U.S.
- Listed height: 6 ft 2 in (1.88 m)
- Listed weight: 175 lb (79 kg)

Career information
- High school: Hamilton Park (Richardson, Texas)
- College: North Texas State
- NFL draft: 1965: 13th round, 169th overall pick

Career history
- New York Giants (1965–1975)

Awards and highlights
- Second-team All-Pro (1970); 2× Pro Bowl (1966, 1968); 49th greatest New York Giant of all-time

Career NFL statistics
- Interceptions: 41
- Fumble recoveries: 16
- Touchdowns: 3
- Sacks: 8.5
- Stats at Pro Football Reference

Carl Ford "Spider" Lockhart (April 6, 1943 – July 9, 1986) was an American professional football player who was a safety for the New York Giants of the National Football League (NFL). He was a two-time Pro Bowler. Lockhart played college football for the North Texas State Eagles (now North Texas Mean Green) and was selected in the 13th round of the 1965 NFL draft.

== Early life ==
Lockhart was born on April 6, 1943, in Dallas, Texas. He attended James Madison High School in Dallas, and then transferred to Hamilton Park High School (located in Richardson, Texas), after a United States Court of Appeals ruled that Dallas had to integrate its public schools. The black transfer students were not allowed to play football that first year (1959), so Lockhart played basketball and ran track, eventually becoming the state high hurdles champion. When Lockhart was allowed to play football the following year, he led the team to a state championship.

== College football ==
He attended North Texas State University (now the University of North Texas). He played running back and defensive back on the school's football team. Lockhart led the Missouri Valley Conference (MVC) in punt returns with his 39.5-yard average. He led the MVC in punting twice. He was posthumously inducted into the North Texas Athletics Hall of Fame in 1992. He was not only an exceptional punter and good defensive back, but Lockhart's coach Odus Mitchell considered him the team's best receiver.

In 1964, he led North Texas in receiving, punt returns, punting and interceptions, and was second in rushing. On offense as a running back and flanker, he had 169 rushing yards on 44 attempts, and 29 receptions for 341 yards that year.

Lockhart was also on the school's track team, as a sprinter and high-hurdler (running 9.9 in the 100-yard dash), and was on its basketball team as well.

== Professional football ==
Lockhart was scouted by future Pro Football Hall of Fame member Emlen Tunnell for the New York Giants. Tunnell, who became the first black assistant coach in the NFL, scouted at smaller schools, especially HBCU schools like North Texas. The Giants drafted Lockhart in the 13th round of the 1965 NFL draft, and Tunnell would become his first defensive backs coach. Tunnell gave Lockhart the nickname Spider, because he could cover the field and receivers like a spider. Teammate Brian Kelley said Lockhart had the speed at free safety to both run down receivers on passing plays, and race toward the line on running plays.

Lockhart spent his entire 11-year career with the Giants. He had four interceptions in his rookie season (1965) and six the following year (1966), playing cornerback. He was a Pro Bowl free safety in 1966, despite the 1966 Giants having a 1–12–1 record, and being the worst defensive team in points allowed/game in NFL history. The Giants allowed 501 points in 14 games for a 35.8 points per game average. (In 2024, the Carolina Panthers allowed 534 points in 16 games; 33.4 points per game.)

The Giants worst game came on November 27, 1966, a 72–41 loss to the Washington Redskins. The Giants' run defense was shredded for 209 yards on only 24 attempts (8.7 yards per carry), including four rushing touchdowns. The Giants also gave up 132 net passing yards (on 16 passes, three for touchdowns). As of 2025, Washington's 72 points is still the most points scored by a team in a single game, and the teams' 113 combined points are the most total points in a single game. Lockhart did get an interception against future hall of fame quarterback Sonny Jurgensen in the game.

Despite being a Pro Bowl cornerback in 1966, he was switched to safety in 1967. That year, Lockhart led the NFL in fumble recoveries (4), to go along with five interceptions. He was selected to the Pro Bowl again in 1968, this time as a free safety; and The Sporting News named him first team All-Conference. He had eight interceptions that year (tied for third best in the NFL), and tied for the league lead in defensive touchdowns (2).

From 1969-75, he started 89 of the 91 games in which he appeared for the Giants, with 18 interceptions and eight fumble recoveries. The Giants only had two winning seasons over that period, and never reached the playoffs. Over his Giants' career, Lockhart intercepted 41 passes and recovered 16 fumbles during his 145 games played. He is third all-time on the Giants in interceptions (through 2024), with Tunnell first with 74 interceptions as a Giant. Lockhart also gained 328 yards returning punts and was famous for rarely calling for a fair catch.

== Post-football life ==
Lockhart retired from football in 1975 at the age of 32 and was a resident of Teaneck, New Jersey. From July 1976 until his death, Lockhart worked as a stockbroker for Prudential Bache.

== Death and litigation ==
On July 9, 1986, at the age of 43, Spider died of lymphoma. In his honor, a "Spider patch" was worn by the Giants throughout their Super Bowl XXI-winning 1986 season.

In 1993, his widow won a $15.7 million malpractice verdict, after claiming that doctors at St. Vincent's Hospital had misdiagnosed swollen lymph nodes when he went to the hospital in 1979 and told a doctor there that he feared that he had cancer. Then living in Mahwah, New Jersey, Lockhart was not correctly diagnosed until he returned to see a doctor two years after his initial complaint.

== Honors ==
For the Giants 100th anniversary, a committee of experts selected the 100 greatest Giants players. Lockhart was listed as the 49th greatest Giant.
