= Tom Kennedy (quarterback) =

American football player (1938–2006)

No. 18
- Position: Quarterback

Personal information
- Born: November 27, 1938; Maywood, California, U.S.
- Died: March 15, 2006 (aged 67); Long Beach, California, U.S.
- Listed height: 6 ft 1 in (1.85 m)
- Listed weight: 210 lb (95 kg)

Career information
- High school: Pasadena (CA)
- College: Los Angeles State
- NFL draft: 1962: undrafted

Career history
- Cleveland Browns (1962)*; Denver Broncos (1962)*; New York Giants (1966)
- * Offseason or practice squad member only

Career NFL statistics
- Passing attempts: 100
- Passing completions: 55
- Completion percentage: 55.0%
- TD–INT: 7–6
- Passing yards: 748
- Passer rating: 77.4
- Stats at Pro Football Reference

Tom Kennedy (November 27, 1938 – March 15, 2006) was an American football quarterback. He played for the New York Giants in 1966.

== Pre-NFL career ==
After playing high school football at Pasadena High School, and college football at Los Angeles State, Kennedy played quarterback for multiple minor league professional teams. These included the Wheeling Ironmen of the United Football League from 1962–63; the Providence Steamrollers of the ACFL in 1964; the Rhode Island Indians of the Continental Football League in 1965; and the Brooklyn Dodgers, also of the Continental Football League, in 1966. In 1963, he was voted as the quarterback on the All-United Football League team. He was playing for the Dodgers when the Giants, needing quarterback help due to injuries, signed him on November 7, 1966.

== NFL career ==
Kennedy appeared in 6 games for the New York Giants in 1966, and was one of three quarterbacks who saw playing time for them, along with Gary Wood and Earl Morrall. Kennedy joined the Giants after mid-season injuries to Morrall and Wood. Kennedy's first NFL game came in relief of Wood in a 55–14 road loss to the Los Angeles Rams. Kennedy's only NFL start came in a most memorable contest two weeks later: the highest scoring regular season game in NFL history. It took place in Washington on November 27, 1966, and the Washington Redskins beat the Giants 72–41. Kennedy was pulled by Giants head coach Allie Sherman after losing a fumble (which was returned 62 yards by Brig Owens for a Washington touchdown), and throwing three interceptions, all in the first half. Sherman did put Kennedy back in to the game in the second half. Kennedy's final stats for the game were 13 of 21 passes completed for 165 yards, with one touchdown pass and three interceptions. He also had one 8 yard run and was sacked four times.

The 1966 Giants went 1–12–1, their worst record ever, and sought to improve their quarterback play. Their quarterbacks threw the most interceptions in the NFL in 1966 (31 in just 14 games), completed just under half of their passes, and were sacked 62 times, second only to the Pittsburgh Steelers who took 66 sacks. On March 7, 1967, the Giants traded two first round and two second round draft picks to the Minnesota Vikings for their famously mobile, future Hall of Fame quarterback Fran Tarkenton. Tarkenton became the Giants' starter, with Morrall as his backup. Gary Wood moved on to the expansion New Orleans Saints, but Tom Kennedy never appeared in an NFL game again.

== Post-NFL career ==
Kennedy continued his professional career in minor league football after his NFL days. He did not play in 1967, but returned to play in the Continental Football League for the Sacramento Capitols in 1968 and the Seattle Rangers in 1969. His professional career ended with the Bridgeport Jets of the Atlantic Coast Football League in 1970.

== Life outside of football ==
Kennedy served in the United States Marine Corps.
