= Steve Jackson (linebacker) =

American football player (born 1942)

No. 53
- Position: Linebacker

Personal information
- Born: December 8, 1942 (age 83); Mckinney, Texas, U.S.
- Listed height: 6 ft 1 in (1.85 m)
- Listed weight: 225 lb (102 kg)

Career information
- High school: Arlington (Arlington, Texas)
- College: Arlington State

Career history
- Washington Redskins (1966–1967)
- Stats at Pro Football Reference

Stephen Franklin Jackson (born December 8, 1942, in McKinney, Texas) is an American former professional football player who was a linebacker for the Washington Redskins of the National Football League (NFL). He played college football for the Arlington State Rebels.
