= Randy Staten =

American politician and football player (1944–2020)

Member of the Minnesota House of Representatives from district 57B
- In office January 4, 1983 – January 5, 1987
- Preceded by: Lee Greenfield
- Succeeded by: Richard H. Jefferson

Member of the Minnesota House of Representatives from district 56A
- In office January 6, 1981 – January 3, 1983
- Preceded by: James R. Casserly
- Succeeded by: Leonard R. Price

Personal details
- Born: Randolph Wilbert Staten; January 24, 1944 Charlotte, North Carolina, U.S.
- Died: May 29, 2020 (aged 76) Charlotte, North Carolina, U.S.
- Party: Democratic
- Football career

No. 83
- Position: Defensive end

Personal information
- Listed height: 6 ft 1 in (1.85 m)
- Listed weight: 225 lb (102 kg)

Career information
- High school: Charlotte (NC) Second Ward
- College: Minnesota

Career history
- New York Giants (1967)
- Stats at Pro Football Reference

Randolph Wilbert Staten, Sr. (January 24, 1944 – May 29, 2020) was an American politician and football player.

Staten served in the Minnesota House of Representatives from 1981 to 1987 and was a Democrat. He was the only African-American to be elected to the Minnesota Legislature in 1980. Staten was tried and convicted for writing bad checks and for shoplifting in 1985 and 1987.

== Background ==
He was previously an American football defensive end. He played for the New York Giants in 1967.

Staten was born in Charlotte, North Carolina and graduated from Second Ward High School in Charlotte in 1962. He received his bachelor's degree in speech and advance communications from University of Minnesota. Staten went to New York University to graduate school for business management. Staten lived in Minneapolis and was a businessman.

He died on May 29, 2020, in Charlotte, North Carolina, at age 76.
