= Jim Avery (American football) =

American football player (born 1944)

No. 61
- Position: Tight end

Personal information
- Born: July 11, 1944 (age 82); Grand Rapids, Michigan, U.S.

Career information
- College: North Central

Career history
- 1966: Washington Redskins
- Stats at Pro Football Reference

James Richard Avery (born July 11, 1944) is an American former professional football player who was a tight end for the Washington Redskins of the National Football League (NFL) in 1966. He was born in Grand Rapids, Michigan, and he played college football for the North Central Cardinals.
