= Lou Kirouac =

American football player (born 1940)

No. 71, 61, 65
- Position: Guard / tackle / kicker

Personal information
- Born: May 17, 1940 (age 86); Manchester, New Hampshire, U.S.
- Listed height: 6 ft 3 in (1.91 m)
- Listed weight: 248 lb (112 kg)

Career information
- High school: Bishop Bradley (Manchester)
- College: Boston College

Career history
- New York Giants (1963); Baltimore Colts (1964); Atlanta Falcons (1966–1967)
- Stats at Pro Football Reference

Louis A. Kirouac (born May 17, 1940) is an American former professional football player for the New York Giants, Baltimore Colts and Atlanta Falcons of the National Football League (NFL). He played college football for the Boston College Eagles.
