= Dan Lewis (American football) =

American football player (1936–2015)

- Lewis in 1963

No. 45, 22, 41
- Positions: Halfback, fullback

Personal information
- Born: February 14, 1936; Freehold Township, New Jersey, U.S.
- Died: March 6, 2015 (aged 79); Detroit, Michigan, U.S.
- Listed height: 6 ft 1 in (1.85 m)
- Listed weight: 199 lb (90 kg)

Career information
- High school: Freehold Township
- College: Wisconsin
- NFL draft: 1958: 6th round, 73rd overall pick

Career history
- Detroit Lions (1958–1964); Washington Redskins (1965); New York Giants (1966)

Awards and highlights
- Second-team All-Big Ten (1957)

Career NFL statistics
- Rushing yards: 3,205
- Rushing average: 4
- Receptions: 99
- Receiving yards: 1,162
- Total touchdowns: 24
- Stats at Pro Football Reference

Daniel Nathan Lewis (February 14, 1936 – March 6, 2015) was an American professional football halfback, fullback in the National Football League (NFL) for the Detroit Lions (1958–1964), the Washington Redskins (1965), and the New York Giants (1966). He played college football at the University of Wisconsin.

== Biography ==
=== Early life ===
Lewis was born in 1936 in Freehold, New Jersey. He played high school football at Freehold High School in Freehold Borough, New Jersey.

=== College career ===
Lewis played college football for the Wisconsin Badgers. As a junior in 1956, he totaled 606 yards from scrimmage, including 554 rushing yards on 100 carries for an average of 5.5 yards per carry. As a senior in 1957, he gained 782 yards from scrimmage, including 611 rushing yards on 95 carries for an average of 6.4 yards per carry. His 1957 tally of 611 rushing yards ranked fourth best in the Big Ten Conference.

=== Professional career ===
Lewis was drafted by the Detroit Lions in the sixth round (73rd overall pick) of the 1958 NFL draft. He played seven years with the Lions from 1958 to 1964. He led the team in 1962 with 488 rushing yards and again in 1963 with 528 rushing yards. He was the first African American to lead the Lions in rushing. At the end of his career with the Lions, he ranked fourth in franchise history with 2,698 rushing yards.

In September 1965, Lewis was traded to the Washington Redskins in exchange for a draft choice. Playing at fullback, Lewis ranked second on the Redskins with 343 rushing yards in 1965.

Lewis was cut by the Redskins after the 1965 season. He signed with the Atlanta Falcons in the off-season but was released before the start of the 1966 NFL season. He signed as a free agent with the New York Giants in September 1966. In his final NFL season, Lewis appeared in 13 games for the Giants, rushing for 164 yards on 32 carries.

=== Family and later years ===
Lewis and his wife, Marian, had three sons. After retiring from football, Lewis worked as Detroit's deputy director of city planning. In March 2015, he died in Detroit of complications from diabetes.

== NFL career statistics ==
Legend
| **Bold** | Career high |

| Year | Team | Games | | Rushing | | | | | Receiving | | | | |
| Year | Team | GP | GS | Att | Yds | Avg | Lng | TD | Rec | Yds | Avg | Lng | TD |
|---|---|---|---|---|---|---|---|---|---|---|---|---|---|
| 1958 | DET | 11 | 1 | 25 | 131 | **5.2** | 20 | 0 | 1 | 12 | 12.0 | 12 | 0 |
| 1959 | DET | 11 | 9 | 49 | 199 | 4.1 | 20 | 2 | 5 | 75 | 15.0 | 30 | 0 |
| 1960 | DET | 12 | 7 | 92 | 438 | 4.8 | **74** | 1 | 12 | 192 | **16.0** | 55 | 1 |
| 1961 | DET | 13 | 10 | 110 | 451 | 4.1 | 27 | 4 | 8 | 118 | 14.8 | 22 | 0 |
| 1962 | DET | 12 | 9 | 120 | 488 | 4.1 | 64 | **6** | 16 | 158 | 9.9 | 34 | 1 |
| 1963 | DET | 14 | 12 | **133** | **528** | 4.0 | 27 | 2 | 15 | 115 | 7.7 | 30 | 0 |
| 1964 | DET | 11 | 7 | 122 | 463 | 3.8 | 28 | 1 | 11 | 129 | 11.7 | **92** | 1 |
| 1965 | WAS | 13 | 10 | 117 | 343 | 2.9 | 23 | 2 | **25** | **276** | 11.0 | 37 | **2** |
| 1966 | NYG | 13 | 2 | 32 | 164 | 5.1 | 57 | 1 | 6 | 87 | 14.5 | 25 | 0 |
| Career | | 110 | 67 | 800 | 3,205 | 4.0 | 74 | 19 | 99 | 1,162 | 11.7 | 92 | 5 |
