= Pete Gogolak =

Hungarian player of American football

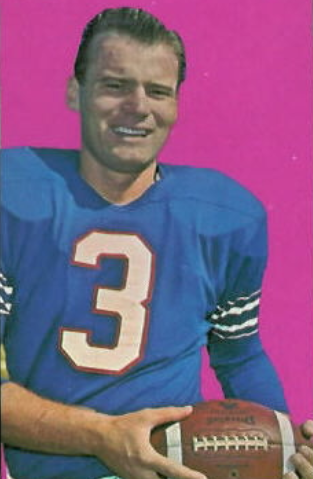
- Topps card of Gogolak, 1966

No. 3
- Position: Placekicker

Personal information
- Born: April 18, 1942 (age 84); Budapest, Hungary
- Listed height: 6 ft 1 in (1.85 m)
- Listed weight: 190 lb (86 kg)

Career information
- High school: Ogdensburg Free Academy (Ogdensburg, New York, U.S.)
- College: Cornell
- NFL draft: 1964: undrafted
- AFL draft: 1964: 12th round, 92nd overall pick

Career history
- Buffalo Bills (1964–1965); New York Giants (1966–1974)

Awards and highlights
- 2× AFL champion (1964, 1965); AFL All-Star (1965); New York Giants Ring of Honor; 42nd greatest New York Giant of all-time

Career NFL statistics
- Field goals: 173/294 (.588)
- Extra points: 344/354 (.972)
- Points: 863
- Stats at Pro Football Reference

Peter Kornel Gogolak (English: /ˈɡoʊɡəlæk/; Hungarian: Gogolák Péter Kornél; born April 18, 1942) is a Hungarian-born former American football player who was a placekicker in the American Football League (AFL) for the Buffalo Bills, and in the National Football League (NFL) for the New York Giants.

Gogolak is widely considered the chief figure behind the game's adoption of soccer style placekicking. In 1966, after playing two seasons for the AFL's Bills, he joined the NFL's Giants in May after playing out his option, sparking the "war between the leagues" and effectively expediting the subsequent AFL–NFL merger agreement in June. He is distinguished as being the first Hungarian to play in the NFL. His younger brother Charlie Gogolak also became a placekicker, playing six seasons professionally.

In 2010, the New York Giants announced that Gogolak would be included in the team's new Ring of Honor to be displayed at all home games in their new stadium. To this day, he remains the Giants all-time leading scorer with 646 points.

== Innovation in placekicking ==
The son of a physician, Gogolak came to the United States with his family as a teen, following the Hungarian Revolution of 1956, and settled in Ogdensburg, New York. He played college football in the Ivy League at Cornell University, where he was elected to the Sphinx Head Society and was a member of Delta Upsilon fraternity.

With his roots in European soccer, Gogolak approached the football at an angle and kicked it with his instep, rather than the then-conventional straight-on approach, impacting with the toes. Not taken in the twenty-round 1964 NFL draft, he was selected in the twelfth round of the AFL draft by the Buffalo Bills, bringing yet another innovation to the upstart league that had become known for its experimentation. The unorthodox style that had made Gogolak notable while in college now made him professional football's first "soccer style" (as opposed to "conventional") kicker. In 1965, he scored 115 points and was selected by his peers as a Sporting News All-AFL player. He made 28 of 46 field goal attempts (.609), and connected on all 31 extra point attempts, as the Bills repeated as AFL champions.

== Importance in AFL–NFL merger ==
Gogolak was also a prime factor in the "war between the leagues" and the subsequent merger of the National Football League with the American Football League. Bills' owner Ralph Wilson paid Gogolak $10,000 in 1964 and offered him $13,500 for 1965, exceptional pay, in those days, for a kicker. Choosing instead to take a reduction in pay to $9,900, Gogolak was able to "play out his option", thereby forcing the Bills to match any other team's subsequent offer. A wealthy suitor was at hand: the NFL's New York Giants, playing in the NFL's largest market, found itself saddled with struggling rookie kicker Bob Timberlake, who made just one field goal in fifteen attempts (.067) in 1965. Fullback Chuck Mercein also had two attempts without success and the Giants finished at 7–7, four games behind the Cleveland Browns. The Giants' mediocrity could not be attributed to a lack of field goal proficiency; the average margin in their seven losses was 21 points, and the closest was 13 points (to the Browns).

Wellington Mara of the Giants ignored the owners' "gentleman's agreement" against signing another league's players, an arrangement that had previously depressed player wages and prevented inter-league competition over otherwise valued athletes. The only player to jump leagues had been end Willard Dewveall, who left the Chicago Bears after the 1960 season for the AFL's Houston Oilers. Although the leagues competed for new collegiate talent over the next five years, they had adhered to an unwritten understanding not to sign each other's veteran players.

The desperate Giants, then playing in Yankee Stadium, whose late autumn winds sometimes rivaled those faced by Gogolak in Buffalo, signed the Bills star and Gogolak went on to become the Giants' all-time leading scorer. As NFL owners had feared, the May signing led to a marked increase in similar "poachings" by new AFL Commissioner Al Davis, bringing other NFL stars to the newer league. Ultimately, this increasingly expensive competition for key players was a significant contributory factor to the two leagues' owners reaching accord in the AFL–NFL merger on June 8, 1966. Part of the agreement was no inter-league trades, so the movement of notable NFL players (Roman Gabriel, John Brodie, and Mike Ditka) to the AFL was disallowed.

The Giants reactivated Len Grant's #3 in 1966, at Gogolak's request (Len Grant was the Giants' tackle and captain, who died from a lightning strike in 1938 while playing golf, shortly before training camp, and his #3 was retired that same year).

Gogolak made 16 of 28 attempts (.571) for the Giants in 1966, but they finished at 1–12–1, the worst record in franchise history (and in pro football in 1966). Gogolak was inducted into the U.S. Army in January 1967; he had failed a physical the previous summer due to a childhood spinal injury, but standards had since been relaxed. He appeared in only nine games in 1967 and retired after the 1974 season, his ninth with the Giants.

== After football ==
After his playing career, Gogolak was a longtime sales executive with the printing firm RR Donnelley in New York City, and resides in Darien, Connecticut.

== Family ==
He was not the only placekicker in his family; his younger brother Charlie played college football at Princeton and followed him into pro football, playing with the Washington Redskins and Boston / New England Patriots in a six-year career. While with the Redskins, he earned a law degree from George Washington University.

In 2008, Pete Gogolak's 36-year-old son David, a restaurateur, was killed in an avalanche while skiing near Whitefish Mountain Resort in northwest Montana.

As there was no high school soccer team at the time, both brothers played football at Ogdensburg Free Academy in Ogdensburg, New York, a small city on the St. Lawrence River along the Canada–US border.

He is a vocal critic of Colin Kaepernick and NFL players who kneel during the National Anthem. Gogolak is a Republican and long time supporter of Donald Trump.

== Records ==
- Giants’ all-time leading scorer, with 646 points
- Giants’ franchise records for most points after touchdowns attempted (277) and made (268)
- Most PATs in a game (eight vs. Philadelphia on Nov. 26, 1972)
- Held record most consecutive PATs at time of retirement, since has been broken (133)
- Held record for most field goals attempted (219) and made (126) at time of retirement, since has been broken

== See also ==
- 1966 New York Giants–Washington Redskins game
- List of American Football League players
