= Allen Jacobs =

American football player (1941–2014)

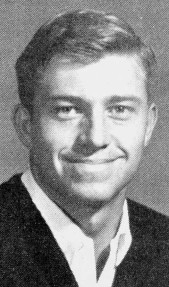

No. 35, 30
- Positions: Fullback, Halfback

Personal information
- Born: May 19, 1941; Los Angeles, California, U.S.
- Died: April 22, 2014 (aged 72); Salt Lake City, Utah, U.S.
- Listed height: 6 ft 1 in (1.85 m)
- Listed weight: 215 lb (98 kg)

Career information
- High school: Franklin (Los Angeles)
- College: Utah (1963-1964)
- NFL draft: 1964: 10th round, 139th overall pick
- AFL draft: 1964: 26th round, 205th overall pick

Career history

Playing
- Green Bay Packers (1965); New York Giants (1966–1967)

Coaching
- Westminster Parsons (1971-1978) Head coach

Awards and highlights
- NFL champion (1965)

Career NFL statistics
- Rushing yards: 301
- Rushing average: 3.3
- Receptions: 10
- Receiving yards: 69
- Total touchdowns: 1
- Stats at Pro Football Reference

Head coaching record
- Career: 31–40–0 (.437)

Allen Winnett Jacobs (May 19, 1941 – April 22, 2014) was a National Football League (NFL) fullback and halfback with the Green Bay Packers and New York Giants. He played college football at the University of Utah.

Jacobs was drafted by the Green Bay Packers in the tenth round (139th overall) of the 1964 NFL draft. He was a member of the 1965 NFL Champion Green Bay Packer team. He was also drafted by the AFL's Buffalo Bills in the 26th round (205th overall) of the 1964 American Football League draft.

After his playing career ended, Jacobs served for eight seasons as the head coach of Westminster Parsons football from 1971 to 1978. During his tenure, Jacobs compiled an overall record of 31 wins and 41 losses (31–41).

Jacobs died on April 22, 2014, from a heart attack.

== Head coaching record ==
Year	Team	Overall	Conference	Standing	Bowl/playoffs
Westminster Parsons (Rocky Mountain Athletic Conference) (1971)
1971	Westminster	4–4	2–4	T–5th (Mountain)	
1972	Westminster	3–6	1–5	T–6th	
1973	Westminster	3–6	2–4	6th	
1974	Westminster	6–3	3–3	T–2nd	
1975	Westminster	4–5	2–5	6th	
1976	Westminster	4–5	3–5	T–6th	
1977	Westminster	5–4	5–4	5th	
1978	Westminster	2–7	2–6	T–7th	
Westminster:		31–40	20–36		
Total:		31–40			
