= Joe Morrison =

American football player and coach (1937–1989)

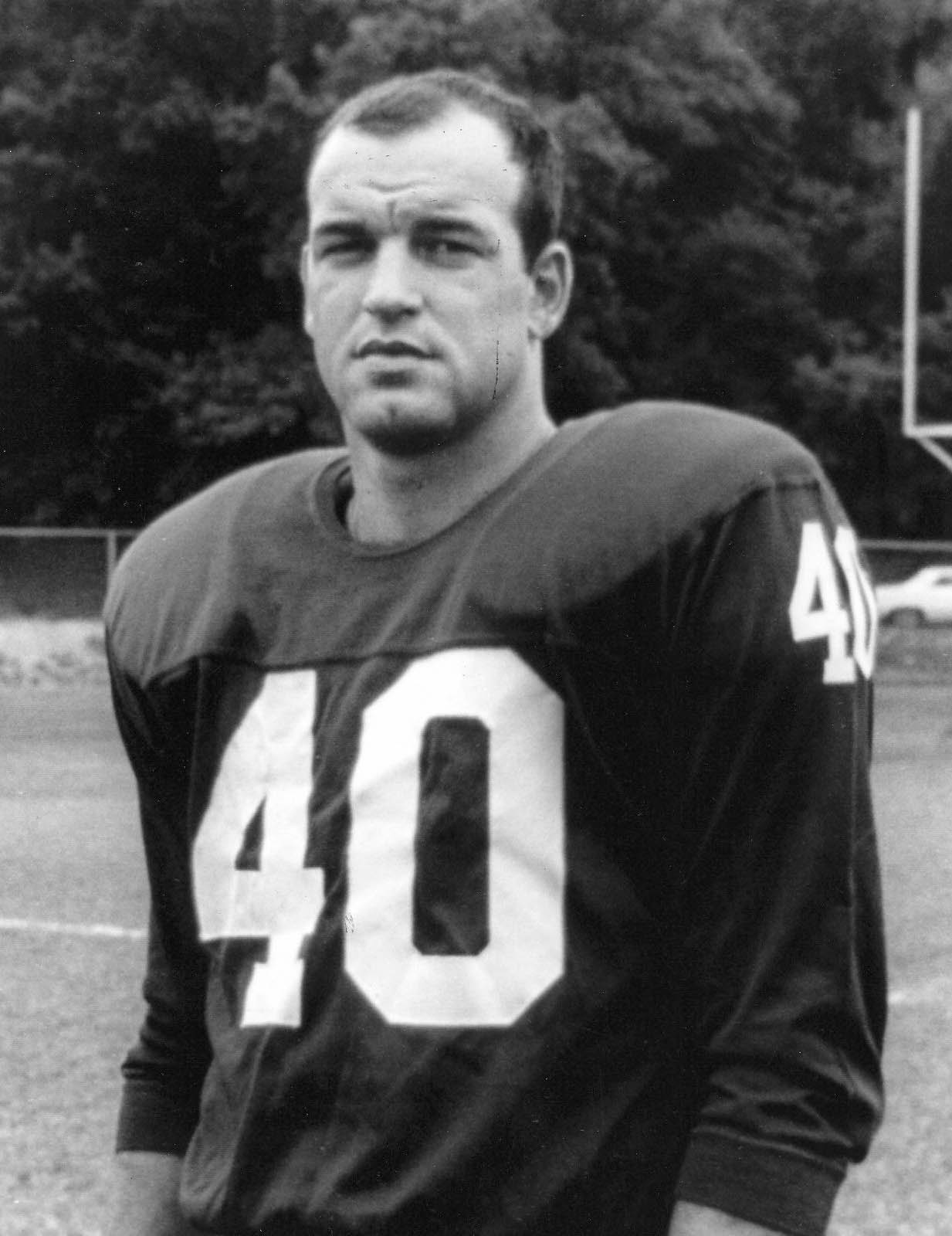
- Morrison with the New York Giants

No. 40
- Positions: Running back, wide receiver

Personal information
- Born: August 21, 1937; Lima, Ohio, U.S.
- Died: February 5, 1989 (aged 51); Columbia, South Carolina, U.S.
- Listed height: 6 ft 1 in (1.85 m)
- Listed weight: 210 lb (95 kg)

Career information
- High school: Lima South
- College: Cincinnati
- NFL draft: 1959: 3rd round, 34th overall pick

Career history

Playing
- New York Giants (1959–1972)

Coaching
- Chattanooga (1973–1979) Head coach; New Mexico (1980–1982) Head coach; South Carolina (1983–1988) Head coach

Awards and highlights
- New York Giants Ring of Honor; New York Giants No. 40 retired; 29th greatest New York Giant of all-time; Walter Camp Coach of the Year (1984); Independent Coach of the Year (1987)

Career NFL statistics
- Rushing yards: 2,474
- Rushing average: 3.7
- Receptions: 395
- Receiving yards: 4,993
- Total touchdowns: 65
- Stats at Pro Football Reference

Head coaching record
- Regular season: 101–72–7 (.581)

Joseph R. Morrison (August 21, 1937 – February 5, 1989) was an American professional football player and coach. He played professionally as a running back and wide receiver in the National Football League (NFL) for the New York Giants from 1959 to 1972. Morrison served as the head football coach at the University of Tennessee at Chattanooga from 1973 to 1979, at the University of New Mexico from 1980 to 1982, and at the University of South Carolina from 1983 to 1988, compiling a career college football coach record of 101–72–7.

== Playing career ==
Morrison was born in Lima, Ohio. He attended the University of Cincinnati where he played both halfback and quarterback and also played on defense during his three varsity seasons. Morrison was drafted by the Giants in the third round of the 1959 NFL draft, where he mostly played at the positions of running back and wide receiver. He had a long career with the Giants, playing from 1959 to 1972. He is 3rd on the Giants' team record for receptions, with 395 catches, from seven different quarterbacks; over his career his plays gained 4,993 yards. His jersey number (#40) has been retired by the Giants.

Morrison's best individual season as a receiver came in 1966 when the Giants won only one game. He caught 46 passes for 724 yards and scored six touchdowns. While the Giants fell on hard times, Morrison was one of the bright stars on the team. He also had five seasons of 40 receptions or more between 1964 and 1971.

Because he played many positions as needed for the Giants, he was nicknamed "Old Dependable."

== NFL career statistics ==
Legend
**Bold**	Career high

=== Regular season ===
Year	Team	Games		Rushing					Receiving				
Year	Team	GP	GS	Att	Yds	Avg	Lng	TD	Rec	Yds	Avg	Lng	TD
1959	NYG	12	3	62	165	2.7	14	1	17	183	10.8	37	1
1960	NYG	12	10	103	346	3.4	19	2	29	367	12.7	51	3
1961	NYG	13	7	33	48	1.5	14	1	11	67	6.1	16	1
1962	NYG	14	0	35	146	4.2	21	1	6	107	**17.8**	36	2
1963	NYG	14	7	**119**	**568**	4.8	**70**	3	31	284	9.2	57	**7**
1964	NYG	14	12	45	138	3.1	15	1	40	505	12.6	**70**	2
1965	NYG	13	9	3	20	**6.7**	11	1	41	574	14.0	46	4
1966	NYG	14	14	67	275	4.1	20	2	**46**	**724**	15.7	49	6
1967	NYG	13	11	36	161	4.5	11	2	37	524	14.2	59	**7**
1968	NYG	14	14	9	28	3.1	11	0	37	425	11.5	68	6
1969	NYG	14	9	107	387	3.6	13	**4**	44	647	14.7	65	**7**
1970	NYG	10	3	11	25	2.3	7	0	11	136	12.4	25	0
1971	NYG	13	3	38	131	3.4	20	0	40	411	10.3	45	1
1972	NYG	14	0	9	36	4.0	45	0	5	39	7.8	13	0
Career		184	102	677	2,474	3.7	70	18	395	4,993	12.6	70	47

=== Playoffs ===
Year	Team	Games		Rushing					Receiving				
Year	Team	GP	GS	Att	Yds	Avg	Lng	TD	Rec	Yds	Avg	Lng	TD
1959	NYG	1	0	0	0	0.0	0	0	0	0	0.0	0	0
1961	NYG	1	1	0	0	0.0	0	0	0	0	0.0	0	0
1962	NYG	1	0	0	0	0.0	0	0	1	0	0.0	0	0
1963	NYG	1	1	**18**	**61**	**3.4**	**20**	0	**3**	**18**	**6.0**	**11**	0
Career		4	2	18	61	3.4	20	0	4	18	4.5	11	0

== Coaching career ==
Joe Morrison was a head coach at the University of Tennessee at Chattanooga, University of New Mexico, and University of South Carolina. He is one of the few major college head coaches to never work as an assistant coach.

As the head coach at Chattanooga, Morrison turned around a Mocs program coming off four straight losing seasons, pacing them to three straight Southern Conference championships (1977–1979). His record at Chattanooga was 44–29–3 in seven seasons.

Other than his NFL years, he is best remembered as the head coach at South Carolina. Morrison came to USC after three seasons with the Lobos of the University of New Mexico. He was a hot prospect, having gone 10–1 in 1982. Morrison took the Gamecocks to three postseason games (1984 and 1987 Gator Bowl and the 1988 Liberty Bowl) during his tenure.

It was under Morrison in 1983 that South Carolina began the tradition of Einleitung from Also Sprach Zarathustra (theme from the movie "2001: A Space Odyssey") as its pre-game anthem and entrance song. The idea had actually originated with former quarterback Tommy Suggs, who suggested it to then-coach and athletic director Jim Carlen in 1981. However, Carlen wanted the Carolina Band to play it rather than have it played over the stadium's sound system. When Carlen left after the season, Suggs took the idea to his successor as athletic director, Bob Marcum. While Marcum liked it, he suggested that they wait to play it until a brand-new sound system could be installed in 1982. The song was finally played for the first time in Morrison's first year, and partly because of his success the song is identified with him.

Morrison's second season, 1984, was until the turn of the century reckoned as the greatest in school history. It was affectionately dubbed the "Black Magic" year by South Carolina fans because of the team's success and because of Morrison's famous all-black attire (cap, shirt, pants). The team ran a streak of nine consecutive wins (longest single season streak in school history) and was ranked #2 in the nation before being upset by Navy and later falling to Oklahoma State University in the Gator Bowl. Gaining victories against storied programs such as Georgia, Pittsburgh, Notre Dame, Florida State, and arch-rival Clemson, the Gamecocks finished that season with a 10–2 record, which would remain a school record for wins until 2011. Morrison was named by the Walter Camp Foundation as the 1984 National College Football Coach of the Year. Morrison would also be named the Independent Coach of the Year in 1987. The 1984 squad also heralded two first-team All-American players in James Seawright (linebacker) and Del Wilkes (offensive lineman), as well as future NFL players Sterling Sharpe (1984–1987), and Brad Edwards (1984–1987).

Other notable players coached by Morrison included Harold Green, who spent several years with the Cincinnati Bengals in the NFL, current Gamecock football radio broadcaster Todd Ellis, who is the all-time passing leader at South Carolina, and Robert Brooks, who was part of the Green Bay Packers 1997 Super Bowl Championship team. During this time, Charlie Weis, former head coach of the University of Notre Dame and the University of Kansas, was an assistant coach under Morrison, his first coaching job in the college ranks. Also serving as an assistant during Morrison's tenure was Al Groh, who went on to be head coach of the New York Jets and the University of Virginia.

After back-to-back 8–4 season in 1987 and 1988, expectations were high in Columbia for the 1989 campaign. However, it would not come to pass as Morrison collapsed after playing racquetball at a court located inside Williams-Brice Stadium, and died on February 5, 1989, at age 51 from congestive heart failure.

Morrison won his 100th game as a coach in 1988, when South Carolina beat N.C. State 23–7.

== Head coaching record ==
Year	Team	Overall	Conference	Standing	Bowl/playoffs	Coaches^{#}	AP^{°}
Chattanooga Moccasins (NCAA Division II independent) (1973–1976)
1973	Chattanooga	4–7					
1974	Chattanooga	4–7					
1975	Chattanooga	5–5–1					
1976	Chattanooga	6–4–1					
Chattanooga Moccasins (Southern Conference) (1977–1979)
1977	Chattanooga	9–1–1	4–1	T–1st			
1978	Chattanooga	7–3–1	4–1	T–1st			
1979	Chattanooga	9–2	5–1	1st			
Chattanooga:		44–29–3	13–3				
New Mexico Lobos (Western Athletic Conference) (1980–1982)
1980	New Mexico	4–7	3–4	6th			
1981	New Mexico	4–7–1	3–4–1	5th			
1982	New Mexico	10–1	6–1	2nd			
New Mexico:		18–15–1	12–9–1				
South Carolina Gamecocks (NCAA Division I-A independent) (1983–1988)
1983	South Carolina	5–6					
1984	South Carolina	10–2			L Gator	13	11
1985	South Carolina	5–6					
1986	South Carolina	3–6–2					
1987	South Carolina	8–4			L Gator	15	15
1988	South Carolina	8–4			L Liberty		
South Carolina:		39–28–2					
Total:		101–72–7					
National championship Conference title Conference division title or championship game berth

== Legacy ==
Todd Ellis, who played quarterback for Morrison, summarized his former coach's legacy at South Carolina: "Coach Spurrier was an icon before coming here, but there’s a part of the South Carolina community that takes pride in the fact coach Morrison was successful and did it here first. He made South Carolina stand out for the first time. He provided an edge; he made it cool to play at Carolina."

Morrison's legacy still is in place at the University of South Carolina in various ways:

- Black jerseys are part of uniform options in football and other sports.
  - Morrison began the use of black jerseys as a uniform option and used them as the team's primary home jerseys during the 1987 and 1988 seasons.
- The use of Einleitung from Also sprach Zarathustra, Op. 30 (theme from 2001: A Space Odyssey) was a tradition started by Morrison for the football team's pre-game entrance and is still done so today. The theme has been spread to other sports and university functions.
- The offensive MVP of the football spring game every year is designated the Joe Morrison Offensive Player of the Spring.
- The football team's senior defensive MVP every year is awarded the Joe Morrison Award.
- Todd Ellis, who was recruited by Morrison and played most of his college career under Morrison, has been the "Voice of the Gamecocks" since 2003, serving as the play-by-play announcer for South Carolina's football radio coverage.
- The USC Sumter athletic teams are known as the "Fire Ants", named after Morrison's 1984 defense.
- He still holds the record for highest ranking ever achieved by South Carolina in football: No. 2 in 1984.
