= Gary Wood =

American football player (1942–1994)

- Wood playing for the New York Giants

No. 19, 10
- Position: Quarterback

Personal information
- Born: February 5, 1942; Taylor, New York, U.S.
- Died: March 2, 1994 (aged 52); Dix Hills, New York, U.S.
- Listed height: 5 ft 11 in (1.80 m)
- Listed weight: 192 lb (87 kg)

Career information
- High school: Cortland (Cortland, New York)
- College: Cornell (1960-1963)
- NFL draft: 1964: 8th round, 109th overall pick
- AFL draft: 1964: 17th round, 132nd overall pick

Career history
- New York Giants (1964–1966); New Orleans Saints (1967); New York Giants (1968–1969); Ottawa Rough Riders (1970–1971)

Awards and highlights
- CFL Eastern All-Star (1970); Second-team All-American (1963); Third-team All-American (1962); First-team All-East (1963); Second-team All-East (1962)

Career NFL statistics
- Passing attempts: 400
- Passing completions: 186
- Completion percentage: 46.5%
- TD–INT: 14–23
- Passing yards: 2,575
- Passer rating: 55.4
- Rushing yards: 425
- Rushing touchdowns: 6
- Stats at Pro Football Reference

Gary Fay Wood (July 9, 1942 – March 3, 1994) was an American professional football player who was a quarterback for 63 games in the National Football League (NFL) with the New York Giants and New Orleans Saints from 1964 until 1969.

He played college football for the Cornell Big Red and was selected by the Giants in the eighth round of the 1964 NFL draft. In his time in the NFL, Wood had a career completion percentage of 46.5%, as well as a passer rating of 54.5.

On March 24, 1996, Wood was inducted into the National Jewish Sports Hall of Fame.

== Early and personal life ==
Wood was born in Taylor, New York, grew up in Cortland, New York, and was Jewish.

He played football for Cortland High School in Cortland, New York, at which he never played in a losing game.

== College career ==
Wood played as a three-year starting quarterback at Cornell University, beginning in his sophomore season in 1961. Wood was the leading rusher and passer for the Big Red every year in which he was the starter. In 1962, Wood led the nation in all-purpose yards, with 1,395 (155.0 yards per game). That season, he also set an Ivy League total offense record in a game against Penn with 387 yards (207 rushing, 106 throwing), and was named first-team All-Ivy and to the AP All-East Team. He also lettered as a center fielder-second baseman-pitcher on the 1962 Cornell baseball team, batting .277 in 17 games, with a six-inning ERA of 1.49.

In 1963 during his senior year, Wood was elected team captain, had 545 yards passing and 818 yards rushing (8th in the nation), was again named first-team All-Ivy, and was named to the Associated Press All-East team, and was elected to the National Honor Society. He was first in the country in kickoff return yardage (618 yards on 19 returns, for a 32.5 average). He was named Ivy League Player of the Week five times in his career, a two-time All-American honorable mention, set five Ivy League career and single-season offensive records (career total offense (3,457 yards); career rushing (1867); single-season total offense (1,616 yards in '62); single-season rushing (813 yards in '62); single-game total offense (387 yards vs. Penn in '62)), and is the only Ivy League player to rush for 2,000 yards and pass for 1,000 more (he rushed for more yards (2,156) than he passed (1,891)). He also set Cornell records for career total offense, single season total offense; career rushing; single season rushing; and single game total offense.

== Professional career ==
In 1964, Wood was selected in the eighth round (109th overall) of the NFL draft by the New York Giants. He turned down offers from the American Football League and from Canada to play in the NFL. In his rookie season for the Giants he backed-up and frequently replaced injured starter Y. A. Tittle, including famously in the September 20, 1964 game at Pittsburgh. Tittle was knocked out with a concussion and cracked sternum on a hit which led to an interception for a touchdown; Tittle's reaction, kneeling, bloodied and without his helmet, was photographed by Morris Bowman of the Pittsburgh Post-Gazette and became an award-winning photograph, one of the most famous football photographs of all time. Ward, however, could not break through the Steeler defense, and was held to 107 yards passing on 7-of-18 pass attempts and one interception. The Steelers won, 27-24.

Wood appeared in an episode of To Tell The Truth on July 12, 1965.

In 1967, Wood was picked up in the expansion draft for the New Orleans Saints. After playing two games for the Saints in the 1967 season, Wood was demoted to third string behind Billy Kilmer and Gary Cuozzo. Following this season, Wood was then traded back to New York for a draft pick.

Wood spent the remainder of his NFL career in New York backing up Fran Tarkenton, and ended his NFL career in 1969 after having played 63 games. In six NFL seasons, he completed 186 of 400 passes for 2,575 yards and 14 touchdowns, with 18 interceptions.

After retiring from the NFL, Wood played in the Canadian Football League from 1970 to 1971 for the Ottawa Rough Riders.

He was inducted into the Cornell Athletic Hall of Fame in 1989, as well as the New York Sports Hall of Fame and the National Jewish Sports Hall of Fame in 1996.

== After the NFL ==
Following his stint in the Canadian Football League, Wood opened an insurance firm in New York City.

He helped found Temple Beth Torah in Melville, New York.

Wood died in March 1994 at the age of 52 of a heart attack at his home in Dix Hills, Long Island.

== See also ==
- List of NCAA major college yearly punt and kickoff return leaders
- List of select Jewish football players
