= 1962 Dallas Cowboys season =

NFL team season

- Owner: Clint Murchison, Jr.
- General manager: Tex Schramm
- Head coach: Tom Landry
- Home stadium: Cotton Bowl

Results
- Record: 5–8–1
- Division place: 5th NFL Eastern
- Playoffs: Did not qualify

The 1962 Dallas Cowboys season was their third in the league. The team finished with a record of 5 wins, 8 losses, and 1 tie, placing them 5th in the NFL's Eastern Conference.

== Offseason ==
The Cowboys traded away their first-round draft choice (fourth overall) in 1962 NFL draft to the Cleveland Browns. With their first selection the Cowboys selected quarterback Sonny Gibbs from Texas Christian University in the second round (eighteenth overall). Other notable selections in the draft included defensive end George Andrie from Marquette University in the sixth round and Harold Hays from Southern Mississippi in the fourteenth round.

The team acquired several veterans prior to the 1962 season. Sam Baker, formerly of the Browns, was acquired to bring stability to the kicker position. The team traded for offensive tackle Monte Clark from the San Francisco 49ers and acquired Dale Memmelaar, an offensive lineman formerly of the St. Louis Cardinals. Jerry Norton, an eight-year veteran who had played for the Cardinals and the Philadelphia Eagles, was acquired to help out in the secondary. Dick Nolan, who had played defensive back for the New York Giants when Cowboys head coach Tom Landry was the defensive coach there, was hired as an assistant coach on the defensive side of the ball, but ended up actually playing safety for most of the season, in addition to coaching. Lee Folkins, who spent his rookie season with the Green Bay Packers, was the Cowboys starting tight end for most of the year.

Notable rookie free agents the Cowboys signed prior to the season included Pettis Norman, from Johnson C. Smith University, Mike Gaechter, a track and field athlete as well as a football player, from the University of Oregon, and Cornell Green, a basketball player from Utah State University.

=== NFL draft ===
1962 Dallas Cowboys draft
Round	Pick	Player	Position	College	Notes
2	18	Sonny Gibbs	QB	TCU	
3	39	Bobby Plummer	OT	TCU	
6	74	Donnie Davis	E	Southern	Signed with the AFL
6	82	George Andrie *	DE	Marquette	
8	102	Ken Tureaud	RB	Michigan	
10	130	John Longmeyer	OG	Southern Illinois	
11	144	Larry Hudas	E	Michigan State	
13	172	Bob Moses	E	Texas	
14	186	Harold Hays	LB	Southern Mississippi	
15	200	Guy Reese	DT	SMU	
16	214	Bob Johnston	OT	Rice	
17	228	Ray Jacobs *	DT	Howard Payne	Signed with the AFL
18	242	Dave Cloutier	RB	Maine	Signed with the AFL
19	256	Paul Holmes	OT	Georgia	
20	270	Amos Bullocks	RB	Southern Illinois	
Made roster † Pro Football Hall of Fame * Made at least one Pro Bowl during career

14 rookies would end up making the team (7 draft choices, 4 undrafted free agents, 2 acquired by trade and one claimed off waivers):

- Donnie Davis, wide receiver
- George Andrie, defensive end
- Guy Reese, defensive tackle
- Amos Bullocks, running back
- Lynn Hoyem, offensive guard
- Don Talbert, offensive tackle
- Dave Edwards, Linebacker
- Pettis Norman, tight end
- Joe Isbell, offensive guard
- Cornell Green, cornerback
- Mike Gaechter, a safety
- John Meyers, defensive tackle
- Clyde Brock, offensive tackle
- John Cornett, offensive tackle

== Roster ==
Dallas Cowboys 1962 roster
Quarterbacks: 11 Buddy Humphrey; 14 Eddie LeBaron; 17 Don Meredith; Running backs: 22 Amos Bullocks; 35 J. W. Lockett; 31 Amos Marsh; 43 Don Perkins; Wide receivers: 82 Frank Clarke; 89 Donnie Davis; 21 Glynn Gregory; 81 Billy Howton; Tight ends: 83 Lee Folkins; 84 Pettis Norman	Offensive linemen: 77 Clyde Brock T; 73 Monte Clark T; 53 Mike Connelly C; 62 Andy Cvercko G; 75 Bob Fry T; 51 Lynn Hoyem C/G; 60 Joe Isbell G; 70 Dale Memmelaar G; 71 Don Talbert T; Defensive linemen: 66 George Andrie DE; 74 Bob Lilly DE; 78 John Meyers DT; 68 Guy Reese DT	Linebackers: 30 Mike Dowdle OLB; 54 Chuck Howley OLB; 56 Bob Long MLB/OLB; 50 Jerry Tubbs MLB; Defensive backs: 44 Don Bishop CB; 27 Mike Gaechter CB/FS; 34 Cornell Green CB; 23 Dick Nolan FS; 25 Jerry Norton SS; Special teams: 38 Sam Baker K/P	Reserve lists: 79 Ken Frost DT (IR); 67 John Houser G/C/T (IR); 41 Warren Livingston CB (IR); 76 Ed Nutting T (IR); Taxi squad: -- Dave Edwards LB; -- Dave Washington TE; Rookies in italics 36 active, 6 inactive

== Schedule ==
Week	Date	Opponent	Result	Record	Game Site	Attendance	Recap
1	September 16	**Washington Redskins**	**T** 35–35	0–0–1	Cotton Bowl	15,730	Recap
2	September 23	**Pittsburgh Steelers**	**L** 28–30	0–1–1	Cotton Bowl	19,478	Recap
3	September 30	at Los Angeles Rams	**W** 27–17	1–1–1	Los Angeles Memorial Coliseum	26,907	Recap
4	October 7	at **Cleveland Browns**	**L** 10–19	1–2–1	Cleveland Stadium	44,040	Recap
5	October 14	**Philadelphia Eagles**	**W** 41–19	2–2–1	Cotton Bowl	18,645	Recap
6	October 21	at **Pittsburgh Steelers**	**W** 42–27	3–2–1	Forbes Field	23,106	Recap
7	October 28	**St. Louis Cardinals**	**L** 24–28	3–3–1	Cotton Bowl	16,027	Recap
8	November 4	at **Washington Redskins**	**W** 38–10	4–3–1	D.C. Stadium	49,888	Recap
9	November 11	**New York Giants**	**L** 10–41	4–4–1	Cotton Bowl	45,668	Recap
10	November 18	Chicago Bears	**L** 33–34	4–5–1	Cotton Bowl	12,692	Recap
11	November 25	at **Philadelphia Eagles**	**L** 14–28	4–6–1	Franklin Field	58,070	Recap
12	December 2	**Cleveland Browns**	**W** 45–21	5–6–1	Cotton Bowl	24,226	Recap
13	December 9	at **St. Louis Cardinals**	**L** 20–52	5–7–1	Busch Stadium	14,102	Recap
14	December 16	at **New York Giants**	**L** 31–41	5–8–1	Yankee Stadium	62,694	Recap

Conference opponents are in bold text

== Season recap ==
The Cowboys got off to a frustrating start to the 1962 season, as the team was unable to capitalize on opportunities to win their first two games, both played at home. Head coach Tom Landry decided to alternate between quarterbacks Eddie LeBaron and Don Meredith on every play, and the system proved its worth from the start, as the Cowboys offense rolled up 35 points and 483 yards against the Washington Redskins. Flanker Frank Clarke caught 10 passes for 241 yards and scored 3 touchdowns in the game, but kicker Sam Baker missed a 35-yard field goal with 13 seconds left and the Cowboys had to settle for a 35–35 tie. The next week against the Pittsburgh Steelers the team saw a 99-yard touchdown pass from LeBaron to Clarke be erased due to a holding call in the end zone, which not only wiped out the touchdown but also awarded a safety to the Steelers, giving them the 2 points which turned out to be the difference in a 30–28 loss for the Cowboys. The team rebounded the next week in Los Angeles against the Rams with a 27–17 victory, highlighted by LeBaron's 85-yard touchdown pass to Amos Marsh, but lost a defensive struggle in Cleveland the next week to the Browns 19–10.

The Cowboys, leading the NFL in offense after the first four weeks, went on to score a combined 83 points in their next two games, victories over the Philadelphia Eagles and the Steelers. The Cowboys were unable to maintain momentum, losing to the struggling St. Louis Cardinals 28–24 in a sloppily played game, despite Don Perkins rushing for 137 yards. The following week, the Cowboys may have played their most complete game of the season against the surprising Redskins, beating them in Washington 38–10, with the Cowboys' usually inconsistent defense holding the Redskins to 293 yards and just 10 points, while the offense provided their usual assortment of big plays.

The Cowboys faced their biggest test of the season the following week against the Eastern Conference-leading New York Giants in front of a record crowd at home, but the Giants won in a rout, 41–10. Both Eddie LeBaron and Frank Clarke were injured in the game, limiting the Cowboys offense over the next few weeks, and leading to a repeat of the team's late-season tailspin of 1961. The Cowboys would go on to lose four of the last five games of the season, and while Meredith's inexperience would prove costly at times, it was the defense that was the main culprit, allowing 446 yards or more over five of the last six games. The lone bright spot of the late season was a 45–21 victory over the Browns in the team's home finale. Meredith enjoyed his finest day as a professional, throwing two touchdown passes in the first half, and the maligned defense held Browns fullback Jim Brown to just 13 yards.

The Cowboys offense was among the league's best in 1962, finishing second in both yards gained and points scored. The passing offense finished seventh, and quarterbacks Eddie LeBaron and Don Meredith combined for 31 touchdown passes, second in the league. LeBaron earned a trip to the Pro Bowl for his stellar season, his 8.7 yards per pass attempt ranking second overall among quarterbacks. Frank Clarke emerged as one of the league's top receivers, catching 47 passes for 1043 yards and a league best 14 touchdown receptions, while veteran Billy Howton led the team in receptions with 49. The rushing game finished second overall with Don Perkins and Amos Marsh combining for 1747 of the Cowboys 2040 rushing yards. Perkins earned all-pro recognition for his season.

The defense struggled for much of the season, finishing 13th in both yards allowed and points allowed, as the relatively inexperienced players on defense struggled with injuries and the intricacies of Tom Landry's defense. The team showed improvement from the previous two seasons against the run however, finishing fourth overall and allowing only 3.9 yards per carry. Against the pass the defense finished last in passing yards allowed, and allowed a league high 16.8 yards per completion. The pass rush was too often a non-factor, and the defense didn't force as many turnovers as the previous season. Despite these struggles, the Cowboys did get some strong performances from individual performers such as second-year defensive lineman Bob Lilly, who was named to his first pro bowl, and cornerback Don Bishop, who finished with six interceptions. Middle linebacker Jerry Tubbs also earned pro bowl recognition.

Veteran Sam Baker improved the team's kicking game from the previous season, averaging 45.4 yards per punt, and converting 14 field goals out of 27 attempts. Amos Marsh had a solid season returning kickoffs, averaging 25.0 yards per kick return, and returning a kickoff for a score in a victory against the Eagles. The team struggled covering kickoff returns, allowing 25.5 yards per kick return, and finding a reliable punt returner was becoming an annual problem.

== Standings ==
NFL Eastern Conference
	W	L	T	PCT	CONF	PF	PA	STK
New York Giants	12	2	0	.857	10–2	398	283	W9
Pittsburgh Steelers	9	5	0	.643	8–4	312	363	W3
Cleveland Browns	7	6	1	.538	6–5–1	291	257	W1
Washington Redskins	5	7	2	.417	4–6–2	305	376	L1
Dallas Cowboys	5	8	1	.385	4–7–1	398	402	L2
St. Louis Cardinals	4	9	1	.308	4–7–1	287	361	W2
Philadelphia Eagles	3	10	1	.231	3–8–1	282	356	L2

Note: Tie games were not officially counted in the standings until 1972.

== See also ==
1962 NFL season
1962 NFL draft

== Publications ==
The Football Encyclopedia ISBN 0-312-11435-4
Total Football ISBN 0-06-270170-3
Cowboys Have Always Been My Heroes ISBN 0-446-51950-2
