= 1970 Dallas Cowboys season =

NFL team season

- Owner: Clint Murchison, Jr.
- General manager: Tex Schramm
- Head coach: Tom Landry
- Home stadium: Cotton Bowl

Results
- Record: 10–4
- Division place: 1st NFC East
- Playoffs: Won Divisional Playoffs (vs. Lions) 5–0; Won NFC Championship (at 49ers) 17–10; Lost Super Bowl V (vs. Colts) 13–16
- All-Pros: LB Chuck Howley (1st team)
- Pro Bowlers: 3: G John Niland; DT Bob Lilly; CB Mel Renfro

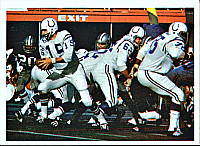
The Cowboys playing against the Colts in Super Bowl V

The 1970 Dallas Cowboys season was the team's 11th in the National Football League (NFL).

Dallas outscored their opponents 299–221, and finished first in their division for the fifth consecutive season. In 1970, the club made its debut on Monday Night Football on November 16, but were shut out 38–0 by the visiting St. Louis Cardinals. The Cowboys advanced to their first Super Bowl, but lost to the Baltimore Colts 16–13.

== Offseason ==
=== NFL draft ===
1970 Dallas Cowboys draft
Round	Pick	Player	Position	College	Notes
1	23	Duane Thomas	RB	West Texas State	
2	29	Bob Asher	OT	Vanderbilt	
2	49	Margene Adkins	WR	Henderson County J.C.	
3	66	Charlie Waters *	S	Clemson	
3	73	Steve Kiner	LB	Tennessee	
3	75	Denton Fox	CB	Texas Tech	
4	101	John Fitzgerald	C	Boston College	
6	153	Pat Toomay	DE	Vanderbilt	
7	179	Don Abbey	LB	Penn State	
8	205	Jerry Dossey	OG	Arkansas	
9	231	Zenon Andrusyshyn	K	UCLA	
10	257	Pete Athas	CB	Tennessee	
11	283	Ivan Southerland	OT	Clemson	
12	309	Joe Williams	RB	Wyoming	
13	335	Mark Washington	CB	Morgan State	
14	361	Julian Martin	WR	North Carolina Central	
15	387	Ken DeLong	TE	Tennessee	
16	413	Seabern Hill	CB	Arizona State	
17	439	Glenn Patterson	C	Nebraska	
Made roster † Pro Football Hall of Fame * Made at least one Pro Bowl during career

=== Undrafted free agents ===
1970 undrafted free agents of note
Player	Position	College
Ernie Babcock	Defensive tackle	Dartmouth
Jeff Guillory	Running back	Idaho
Cliff Harris	Safety	Ouachita Baptist
Walter Hawkins	Defensive back	Utah
Aaron Heard	Wide receiver	Southern
Tom Massey	Defensive back	Stanford
Buzz Montsinger	Defensive End	Richmond
Doug Mooers	Defensive End	Whittier
Byron Olander	Wide receiver	San Diego State

== Roster ==
Dallas Cowboys 1970 roster
Quarterbacks: 14 Craig Morton; 12 Roger Staubach; Running backs: 32 Walt Garrison; 35 Calvin Hill; 30 Dan Reeves; 33 Duane Thomas; 42 Claxton Welch; Wide receivers: 22 Bob Hayes; 24 Dennis Homan; 88 Reggie Rucker; Tight ends: 89 Mike Ditka; 84 Pettis Norman	Offensive linemen: 78 Bob Asher T; 72 Tony Liscio T; 51 Dave Manders C; 73 Ralph Neely T/G; 76 John Niland G; 61 Blaine Nye G; 70 Rayfield Wright T; Defensive linemen: 66 George Andrie DE; 63 Larry Cole DE; 77 Ron East DE/DT; 74 Bob Lilly DT; 75 Jethro Pugh DT; 67 Pat Toomay DE	Linebackers: 52 Dave Edwards OLB; 54 Chuck Howley OLB; 55 Lee Roy Jordan MLB; 60 Steve Kiner OLB; 50 D. D. Lewis OLB; 56 Tom Stincic MLB; Defensive backs: 26 Herb Adderley CB; 45 Richmond Flowers FS; 34 Cornell Green SS; 43 Cliff Harris FS; 20 Mel Renfro CB; 46 Mark Washington CB; 41 Charlie Waters FS; Special teams: 83 Mike Clark K; 10 Ron Widby P	Reserve lists: 23 Margene Adkins WR (IR); 27 Mike Gaechter SS (IR); 19 Lance Rentzel WR (LOA); Taxi squad: 11 Bob Belden QB; 62 John Fitzgerald T; 64 Halvor Hagen G/C; 71 Doug Mooers DE; 36 Joe Williams RB; Rookies in italics 40 active, 3 inactive, 5 practice squad

== Regular season ==
The Cowboys had to overcome many obstacles during the regular season. Fullback Calvin Hill, the team's second leading rusher with 577 yards and 4 touchdowns, was lost for the year after suffering a leg injury late in the regular season. And wide receiver Bob Hayes was benched by head coach Tom Landry for poor performances on several occasions.

Most significantly, the Cowboys had a quarterback controversy between Craig Morton and Roger Staubach. Morton and Staubach alternated as the starting quarterback during the regular season, but Landry eventually chose Morton to start Super Bowl V because he felt less confident that Staubach would follow his game plan (Landry called all of Morton's plays in Super Bowl V). Also, Morton had done extremely well in the regular season, throwing for 1,819 yards and 15 touchdowns, with seven interceptions, earning him a passer rating of 89.8. In contrast, Staubach, although a noted scrambler and able to salvage broken plays effectively, threw for 542 yards, and only two touchdowns with eight interceptions, giving him a 42.9 rating.

Hayes was the main deep threat on the team, catching 34 passes for 889 yards (a 26.1 yards per catch average) and 10 touchdowns, while also rushing 4 times for 34 yards and another touchdown, and adding another 116 yards returning punts. On the other side of the field, wide receiver Lance Rentzel recorded 28 receptions for 556 yards and 5 touchdowns.

However, the main strength on the Cowboys offense was their running game. Rookie running back Duane Thomas rushed 151 times for 803 yards (a 5.1 yards per carry average) and 5 touchdowns, while adding another 416 yards returning kickoffs. Fullback Walt Garrison, who replaced the injured Hill, provided Thomas with excellent blocking and rushed for 507 yards and 3 touchdowns himself. Garrison was also a good receiver out of the backfield, catching 21 passes for 205 yards and 2 touchdowns. Up front, Pro Bowl guard John Niland and future Hall of Famer tackle Rayfield Wright anchored the offensive line.

The Cowboys had their lowest regular season (6–2 vs. Cleveland Browns) and playoff (5–0 vs. Detroit Lions) scoring games in franchise history. The playoff victory over Detroit on December 26 remains the lowest scoring postseason game in NFL history. Through the 2022 season, the Cowboys-Browns game is one of only two 6-2 games in league history; the other was a Packers-Bears game in 1931, and the Cowboys-Lions playoff is one of three 5-0 games, along with a 1927 game between the Providence Steam Roller and Buffalo Bisons, and a Bills-Bengals game in 1978.

For the first time, the Cowboys defeated the Green Bay Packers; this year's game was on Thanksgiving on the new artificial turf of the Cotton Bowl. Green Bay had won the first six contests, four in the regular season (1960, 1964, 1965, 1968) and two in NFL championship games (1966, 1967). The Packers won the next meeting in Green Bay in 1972.

=== Schedule ===
Week	Date	Opponent	Result	Record	Venue	Attendance	Recap
1	September 20	at **Philadelphia Eagles**	**W** 17–7	1–0	Franklin Field	59,728	Recap
2	September 27	**New York Giants**	**W** 28–10	2–0	Cotton Bowl	57,236	Recap
3	October 4	at **St. Louis Cardinals**	**L** 7–20	2–1	Busch Memorial Stadium	50,780	Recap
4	October 11	Atlanta Falcons	**W** 13–0	3–1	Cotton Bowl	53,611	Recap
5	October 18	at Minnesota Vikings	**L** 13–54	3–2	Metropolitan Stadium	47,900	Recap
6	October 25	at Kansas City Chiefs	**W** 27–16	4–2	Municipal Stadium	51,158	Recap
7	November 1	**Philadelphia Eagles**	**W** 21–17	5–2	Cotton Bowl	55,736	Recap
8	November 8	at **New York Giants**	**L** 20–23	5–3	Yankee Stadium	62,938	Recap
9	November 16	**St. Louis Cardinals**	**L** 0–38	5–4	Cotton Bowl	69,323	Recap
10	November 22	at **Washington Redskins**	**W** 45–21	6–4	RFK Stadium	50,415	Recap
11	November 26	Green Bay Packers	**W** 16–3	7–4	Cotton Bowl	67,182	Recap
12	December 6	**Washington Redskins**	**W** 34–0	8–4	Cotton Bowl	57,936	Recap
13	December 12	at Cleveland Browns	**W** 6–2	9–4	Cleveland Stadium	75,458	Recap
14	December 20	Houston Oilers	**W** 52–10	10–4	Cotton Bowl	50,504	Recap
Note: Intra-division opponents are in **bold** text.

=== Game summaries ===
==== Week 1 at Eagles ====
Week One: Dallas Cowboys (0–0) at Philadelphia Eagles (0–0)

Quarter	1	2	3	4	Total
**Cowboys**	0	7	7	3	**17**
Eagles	7	0	0	0	**7**

at Franklin Field, Philadelphia, Pennsylvania

- Date: September 20, 1970
- Game time: 1:00 p.m. EDT
- Game weather: 67 °F (19 °C)
- Game attendance: 59,728
- Referee: John McDonough
- Box Score

Team	Category	Player	Statistics
Cowboys	Passing	Roger Staubach	11/15, 115 yards, TD, INT
Cowboys	Rushing	Calvin Hill	25 rushes, 117 yards
Cowboys	Receiving	Lance Rentzel	6 receptions, 100 yards, TD
Eagles	Passing	Norm Snead	10/23, 138 yards, TD, 3 INT
Eagles	Rushing	Tom Woodeshick	15 rushes, 55 yards
Eagles	Receiving	Ben Hawkins	4 receptions, 57 yards, TD

Scoring summary

Quarter	Time	Drive			Team	Scoring information	Score	
Quarter	Time	Plays	Yards	TOP	Team	Scoring information	DAL	PHI
1					Eagles	Ben Hawkins 10-yard touchdown reception from Norm Snead, Mark Moseley kick good	0	7
2					Cowboys	Walt Garrison 1-yard touchdown run, Mike Clark kick good	7	7
3					Cowboys	Lance Rentzel 31-yard touchdown reception from Roger Staubach, Mike Clark kick good	14	7
4					Cowboys	13-yard field goal by Mike Clark	17	7
"TOP" = time of possession. For other American football terms, see Glossary of American football.							17	7

==== Week 2 ====
Team	1	2	3	4	Total
Giants	3	7	0	0	10
• Cowboys	0	0	14	14	28

- Date: September 27
- Location: Cotton Bowl
- Game start: 1:00 p.m. CST
- Game attendance: 57,236
- Game weather: 61 °F (16 °C); wind 11 mph (18 km/h)
- Referee: Tommy Bell

Scoring summary
Q1	NYG	Gogolak 20 yard field goal	NYG 3–0
Q2	NYG	Johnson 1 yard run (Gogolak kick)	NYG 10–0
Q3	DAL	Hill 3 yard run (Clark kick)	NYG 10–7
Q3	DAL	Garrison 18 yard run (Clark kick)	DAL 14–10
Q4	DAL	Hayes 58 yard pass from Rentzel (Clark kick)	DAL 21–10
Q4	DAL	Hayes 24 yard pass from Staubach (Clark kick)	DAL 28–10

- Bob Hayes 5 Rec, 112 Yds

==== Week 3 ====
Team	1	2	3	4	Total
Cowboys	0	0	0	7	7
• Cardinals	3	3	7	7	20

- Date: October 4
- Location: Civic Center Busch Memorial Stadium
- Game start: 1:00 p.m. CDT
- Referee: Fred Silva

==== Week 4 ====
Team	1	2	3	4	Total
Falcons	0	0	0	0	0
• Cowboys	0	3	3	7	13

- Date: October 11
- Location: Cotton Bowl
- Game start: 1:00 p.m. CDT
- Referee: Fred Swearingen

==== Week 5 ====
Team	1	2	3	4	Total
Cowboys	3	3	0	7	13
• Vikings	14	20	17	3	54

- Date: October 18
- Location: Metropolitan Stadium
- Game start: 3:00 p.m. CDT
- Referee: Bernie Ulman
- TV announcers (CBS): Frank Glieber and Frank Gifford

==== Week 6 ====
Team	1	2	3	4	Total
• Cowboys	3	10	14	0	27
Chiefs	7	3	0	6	16

- Date: October 25
- Location: Municipal Stadium
- Game start: 3:00 p.m. CST
- Referee: Pat Haggerty
- TV announcers (CBS): Ray Scott and Pat Summerall

==== Week 7 ====
Team	1	2	3	4	Total
Eagles	0	0	10	7	17
• Cowboys	0	14	7	0	21

- Date: November 1
- Location: Cotton Bowl
- Game start: 1:00 p.m. CST
- Referee: Ben Dreith
- Television network: CBS

==== Week 8 ====
Team	1	2	3	4	Total
Cowboys	10	7	3	0	20
• Giants	3	6	7	7	23

- Date: November 8
- Location: Yankee Stadium
- Game start: 1:00 p.m. EST
- Referee: Bob Finley
- TV announcers (CBS): Jack Whitaker and Frank Gifford

==== Week 9 ====
Team	1	2	3	4	Total
• Cardinals	7	10	0	21	38
Cowboys	0	0	0	0	0

- Date: November 16
- Location: Cotton Bowl
- Game start: 8:05 p.m. CST
- Referee: Jim Tunney
- TV announcers (ABC): Keith Jackson, Don Meredith and Howard Cosell

==== Week 10 ====
Team	1	2	3	4	Total
• Cowboys	3	21	14	7	45
Redskins	7	0	14	0	21

- Date: November 22
- Location: RFK Stadium
- Game start: 1:00 p.m. EST
- Referee: Norm Schachter

==== Week 11 ====
Team	1	2	3	4	Total
Packers	3	0	0	0	3
• Cowboys	0	3	0	13	16

- Date: November 26
- Location: Cotton Bowl
- Game start: 2:35 p.m. CST
- Referee: Fred Swearingen
- TV announcers (CBS): Ray Scott and Pat Summerall

Thanksgiving Day

==== Week 12 ====
Team	1	2	3	4	Total
Redskins	0	0	0	0	0
• Cowboys	0	7	14	13	34

- Date: December 6
- Location: Cotton Bowl
- Game start: 3:00 p.m. CST
- Referee: Jack Reader

==== Week 13 ====
Team	1	2	3	4	Total
• Cowboys	0	0	3	3	6
Browns	2	0	0	0	2

- Date: December 12
- Location: Cleveland Stadium
- Game start: 12:30 p.m. EST
- Referee: Jim Tunney
- TV announcers (CBS): Frank Glieber and Frank Gifford

The telecast was blacked out in Dallas/Fort Worth due to the NCAA College Division Pecan Bowl being played at Turnpike Stadium that day.

==== Week 14 ====
Team	1	2	3	4	Total
Oilers	3	0	0	7	10
• Cowboys	17	7	14	14	52

- Date: December 20
- Location: Cotton Bowl
- Game start: 1:00 p.m. CST
- Referee: Pat Haggerty
- TV announcers (NBC): Jim Simpson and Al DeRogatis

The Cowboys clinched the NFC East by crushing their in-state rival, combined with the Rams' 31-3 rout of the Giants at Yankee Stadium.. Had the Giants won, they would have won the NFC East, and the Cowboys and Lions would have been forced into a coin toss for the wild card berth. This was scheduled to be the Cowboys' last game at the Cotton Bowl. However, they hosted a playoff game six days later, and due to construction delays at Texas Stadium, would play their first two home games of the next season there.

== Standings ==
NFC East
	W	L	T	PCT	DIV	CONF	PF	PA	STK
Dallas Cowboys	10	4	0	.714	5–3	7–4	299	221	W5
New York Giants	9	5	0	.643	6–2	6–5	301	270	L1
St. Louis Cardinals	8	5	1	.615	5–3	6–5	325	228	L3
Washington Redskins	6	8	0	.429	3–5	4–7	297	314	W2
Philadelphia Eagles	3	10	1	.231	1–7	1–9–1	241	332	W1

Note: Tie games were not officially counted in the standings until 1972.

== Postseason ==
Round	Date	Opponent	Result	Venue	Attendance	Recap
Divisional	December 26, 1970	Detroit Lions	W 5–0	Cotton Bowl	69,613	Recap
NFC Championship	January 3, 1971	at San Francisco 49ers	W 17–10	Kezar Stadium	59,364	Recap
#Super Bowl V	January 17, 1971	vs Baltimore Colts	L 13–16	Orange Bowl	79,204	Recap

=== NFC Divisional Playoff ===
Dallas Cowboys 5, Detroit Lions 0

Quarter	1	2	3	4	Total
Lions	0	0	0	0	0
Cowboys	3	0	0	2	5

at Cotton Bowl, Dallas, Texas

- Game time: 4:00 p.m. EST/3:00 p.m. CST
- Game attendance: 69,613
- Referee: Jim Tunney
- TV announcers (CBS): Frank Glieber and Frank Gifford

Game information
- Scoring
  - DAL – field goal Clark 26 DAL 3–0
  - DAL – Safety, Andrie tackled Landry in end zone DAL 5–0

The Cowboys shut down the Lions offense and took advantage of a first-quarter field goal to outlast the Lions in the lowest-scoring playoff game in NFL history.

=== NFC Championship Game ===
Dallas Cowboys 17, San Francisco 49ers 10

Quarter	1	2	3	4	Total
Cowboys	0	3	14	0	17
49ers	3	0	7	0	10

at Kezar Stadium, San Francisco

- Game time: 5:00 p.m. EST/2:00 p.m. PST
- Game weather: 48 °F (9 °C), sunny
- Game attendance: 59,364
- Referee: Tommy Bell
- TV announcers (CBS): Ray Scott and Pat Summerall

Game information
- Scoring
  - SF – field goal Gossett 16 SF 3–0
  - DAL – field goal Clark 21 3–3
  - DAL – Thomas 13 run (Clark kick) DAL 10–3
  - DAL – Garrison 15 pass from Morton (Clark kick) DAL 17–3
  - SF – Witcher 26 pass from Brodie (Gossett kick)DAL 17–10

=== Super Bowl V ===
Dallas Cowboys 13, Baltimore Colts 16

Quarter	1	2	3	4	Total
Colts (AFC)	0	6	0	10	16
Cowboys (NFC)	3	10	0	0	13

at Orange Bowl, Miami, Florida

- Date: January 17, 1971
- Game time: 2:05 p.m. EST
- Game weather: 70 °F (21 °C), sunny
- Game attendance: 79,204
- Referee: Norm Schachter
- TV announcers (NBC): Curt Gowdy and Kyle Rote

Game information
- Scoring
  - DAL – field goal Clark 14 DAL 3–0
  - DAL – field goal Clark 30 DAL 6–0
  - BAL – Mackey 75 pass from Unitas (kick blocked) 6–6
  - DAL – Thomas 7 pass from Morton (Clark kick) DAL 13–6
  - BAL – Nowatzke 2 run (O'Brien kick) 13–13
- BAL – field goal O'Brien 32 BAL 16–13

Chuck Howley became the first defensive player, and only member of a losing team to be the Super Bowl's Most Valuable Player.

== Awards and records ==
- Chuck Howley, Most Valuable Player, Super Bowl V
- Mel Renfro, Pro Bowl Defensive Most Valuable Player

== Publications ==
The Football Encyclopedia ISBN 0-312-11435-4
Total Football ISBN 0-06-270170-3
Cowboys Have Always Been My Heroes ISBN 0-446-51950-2
