= 1966 Dallas Cowboys season =

NFL team season

- Owner: Clint Murchison, Jr.
- General manager: Tex Schramm
- Head coach: Tom Landry
- Home stadium: Cotton Bowl

Results
- Record: 10–3–1
- Division place: 1st NFL Eastern
- Playoffs: Lost NFL Championship (vs. Packers) 27–34
- All-Pros: 4: CB Cornell Green; LB Chuck Howley; WR Bob Hayes; DT Bob Lilly
- Pro Bowlers: 9: DE George Andrie; CB Cornell Green; WR Bob Hayes; LB Chuck Howley; DT Bob Lilly; C Dave Manders; QB Don Meredith; FB Don Perkins; FS Mel Renfro

The 1966 Dallas Cowboys season was the seventh for the franchise in the National Football League. The Cowboys, who had never previously finished with a winning record in their history, would improve dramatically. Dallas finished 10–3–1 and won the Eastern Conference title, their first of six consecutive division titles. They hosted the NFL Championship Game at the Cotton Bowl, where they lost to the defending NFL champion Green Bay Packers, thus missing out on the chance to play in the first Super Bowl which the Packers went on to win two weeks later.

Quarterback Don Meredith had the best season of his career throwing for 2,805 yards, 24 touchdowns (both career highs) and 12 interceptions.

This season would also start an annual tradition, which the Cowboys would play on Thanksgiving, a holiday they have played every year since.

== Offseason ==
=== NFL draft ===
1966 Dallas Cowboys draft
Round	Pick	Player	Position	College	Notes
1	5	John Niland *	OG	Iowa	
2	22	Willie Townes	DT	Tulsa	
5	79	Walt Garrison *	FB	Oklahoma State	
6	86	Bob Dunlevy	OT	West Virginia	
7	100	Arthur Robinson	WR	Florida A&M	
8	116	Don Kunit	RB	Penn State	
9	130	Darrell Elam	WR	West Virginia Tech	
10	146	Mason Mitchell	RB	Washington	
11	160	Austin Denney	TE	Tennessee	
12	173	Les Shy	DB	Long Beach State	
12	176	Craig Baynham	RB	Georgia Tech	
13	190	Ron Lamb	RB	South Carolina	
14	206	Lewis Turner	RB	Norfolk State	
15	220	Mark Gartung	OT	Oregon State	
16	236	Tom Piggee	RB	San Francisco State	
17	250	George Allen	DT	West Texas State	Signed with the AFL
18	266	Steve Orr	OT	Washington	
19	280	Byron Johnson	OT	Central Washington	
20	296	Lou Hudson	WR	Minnesota	Signed with the NBA
Made roster † Pro Football Hall of Fame * Made at least one Pro Bowl during career

=== Undrafted free agents ===
1966 undrafted free agents of note
Player	Position	College
Jim Brown	Running back	Texas A&I
Alex Bowden	Quarterback	Auburn
Dick Daniels	Safety	Pacific (CA)
Marv Kendrick	Defensive back	Utah State

== Roster ==
Dallas Cowboys 1966 roster
Quarterbacks: 17 Don Meredith; 14 Craig Morton; 13 Jerry Rhome; Running backs: 32 Walt Garrison; 43 Don Perkins; 30 Dan Reeves; 46 Les Shy; 24 J. D. Smith; Wide receivers: 26 Buddy Dial; 35 Pete Gent; 22 Bob Hayes; Tight ends: 82 Frank Clarke; 84 Pettis Norman	Offensive linemen: 68 Jim Boeke T; 53 Mike Connelly C/G; 62 Leon Donohue G; 72 Tony Liscio T/G; 51 Dave Manders C; 73 Ralph Neely T; 76 John Niland G; 57 Malcolm Walker T; Defensive linemen: 66 George Andrie DE; 77 Jim Colvin DT; 74 Bob Lilly DT; 75 Jethro Pugh DT; 79 Larry Stephens DE; 71 Willie Townes DE	Linebackers: 52 Dave Edwards OLB; 56 Harold Hays OLB; 54 Chuck Howley OLB; 55 Lee Roy Jordan MLB; 50 Jerry Tubbs MLB; Defensive backs: 45 Dick Daniels SS; 27 Mike Gaechter SS; 34 Cornell Green CB; 23 Mike Johnson CB; 41 Warren Livingston CB; 25 Obert Logan FS; 20 Mel Renfro FS; Special teams: 11 Danny Villanueva K/P	Reserve lists: 70 Bill Sandeman DT (IR); Taxi squad: 83 Art Robinson TE; 87 Dick Smith WR; 44 Jim Steffen S; 65 John Wilbur G/T; Rookies in italics 40 active, 1 inactive

== Regular season ==
=== Schedule ===
Week	Date	Opponent	Result	Record	Game Site	Attendance	Recap
1	Bye						
2	September 18	**New York Giants**	**W** 52–7	1–0	Cotton Bowl	60,010	Recap
3	September 25	Minnesota Vikings	**W** 27–17	2–0	Cotton Bowl	64,116	Recap
4	October 2	at **Atlanta Falcons**	**W** 47–14	3–0	Atlanta Stadium	56,990	Recap
5	October 9	**Philadelphia Eagles**	**W** 56–7	4–0	Cotton Bowl	69,372	Recap
6	October 16	at **St. Louis Cardinals**	**T** 10–10	4–0–1	Busch Memorial Stadium	50,673	Recap
7	October 23	at **Cleveland Browns**	**L** 21–30	4–1–1	Cleveland Stadium	84,721	Recap
8	October 30	**Pittsburgh Steelers**	**W** 52–21	5–1–1	Cotton Bowl	58,453	Recap
9	November 6	at **Philadelphia Eagles**	**L** 23–24	5–2–1	Franklin Field	60,658	Recap
10	November 13	at **Washington Redskins**	**W** 31–30	6–2–1	D.C. Stadium	50,927	Recap
11	November 20	at **Pittsburgh Steelers**	**W** 20–7	7–2–1	Pitt Stadium	42,185	Recap
12	November 24	**Cleveland Browns**	**W** 26–14	8–2–1	Cotton Bowl	80,259	Recap
13	December 4	**St. Louis Cardinals**	**W** 31–17	9–2–1	Cotton Bowl	76,965	Recap
14	December 11	**Washington Redskins**	**L** 31–34	9–3–1	Cotton Bowl	64,198	Recap
15	December 18	at **New York Giants**	**W** 17–7	10–3–1	Yankee Stadium	62,735	Recap

Conference opponents are in bold text

- A bye week was necessary in 1966, as the league expanded to an odd-number (15) of teams (Atlanta); one team was idle each week.
- This year was the first time the Dallas Cowboys played on Thanksgiving Day

=== Game summaries ===
==== Week 2 vs. New York Giants ====
Week Two: New York Giants (0-0-1) at Dallas Cowboys (0-0)

Quarter	1	2	3	4	Total
Giants	0	7	0	0	**7**
Cowboys	7	24	14	7	**52**

at Cotton Bowl, Dallas

- Date: September 18
- Game weather: 73 °F (23 °C)
- Box Score

Game information

**First quarter**

- Dallas – Don Perkins 1-yard rush (Villanueva kick), Cowboys 7–0.

**Second quarter**

- New York – Homer Jones 20-yard pass from Earl Morrall (Gogolak kick) 7–7.
- Dallas – Bob Hayes 74-yard pass from Don Meredith (Villanueva kick), Cowboys 14–7.
- Dallas – Danny Villanueva 12-yard field goal, Cowboys 17–7.
- Dallas – Dan Reeves 2-yard pass from Don Meredith (Villanueva kick), Cowboys 24–7.
- Dallas – Dan Reeves 1-yard pass from Don Meredith (Villanueva kick), Cowboys 31–7.

**Third quarter**

- Dallas – Bob Hayes 39-yard pass from Don Meredith (Villanueva kick), Cowboys 38–7.
- Dallas – Dan Reeves 19-yard pass from Don Meredith (Villanueva kick), Cowboys 45–7.

**Fourth quarter**

- Dallas – Cornell Green 41-yard interception return (Villanueva kick), Cowboys 52–7

**Top Passers**

- Giants – Earl Morrall: 9/25, 106 yds, 1 TD, 2 INT
- Cowboys – Don Meredith: 14/24, 358 yds, 5 TD

**Top rushers**

- Giants – Chuck Mercein: 11 car, 83 yds
- Cowboys – Don Perkins: 16 car, 52 yds, 1 TD

**Top receivers**

- Giants – Homer Jones: 4 rec, 46 yds. 1 TD
- Cowboys – Bob Hayes: 6 rec, 195 yds. 2 TD

==== Week 8 vs Steelers ====
Week Eight: Pittsburgh Steelers (1–4–1) at Dallas Cowboys (4–1–1)

Quarter	1	2	3	4	Total
Steelers	7	7	7	0	**21**
Cowboys	0	24	21	7	**52**

at Cotton Bowl, Dallas, Texas

- Date: October 30
- Game weather: 64 °F (18 °C)
- Game attendance: 58,453
- Box Score

Game information

**First quarter**

- PIT – Marv Woodson 56-yard interception return (Mike Clark kick), Steelers 7–0.

**Second quarter**

- DAL – Dan Reeves 1-yard pass from Don Meredith (Danny Villanueva kick), 7–7.
- DAL – Lee Roy Jordan 49-yard interception return (Danny Villanueva kick). Cowboys 14–7.
- DAL – Danny Villanueva 12-yard field goal, Cowboys 17–7.
- DAL – Dan Reeves 8-yard pass from Don Meredith (Danny Villanueva kick), Cowboys 24–7.
- PIT – Jim Butler 93-yard kickoff return (Mike Clark kick). Cowboys 24–14.

**Third quarter**

- DAL – Mel Renfro 87-yard kickoff return (Danny Villanueva kick), Cowboys 31–14.
- DAL – Frank Clarke 22-yard pass from Don Meredith (Danny Villanueva kick), Cowboys 38–14.
- PIT – John Hilton 4-yard pass from Ron Smith (Mike Clark kick), Cowboys 38–21.
- DAL – Pete Gent 84-yard pass from Don Meredith (Danny Villanueva kick), Cowboys 45–21.

**Fourth quarter**

- DAL – J.D. Smith 1-yard run (Danny Villanueva kick), Cowboys 52–21.

Top passers

- PIT – Ron Smith – 8/25, 115 yards, TD
- DAL – Don Meredith – 11/25, 226 yards, 4 TD, 3 INT

Top rushers

- PIT – Jim Butler – 5 rushes, 9 yards
- DAL – Dan Reeves – 13 rushes, 66 yards

Top receivers

- PIT – Roy Jefferson – 4 receptions, 74 yards
- DAL – Pete Gent – 1 reception, 84 yards, TD

==== Week 10 at Redskins ====
Week Ten: Dallas Cowboys (5–2–1) at Washington Redskins (5–4)

Quarter	1	2	3	4	Total
**Cowboys**	7	7	7	10	**31**
Redskins	6	0	17	7	**30**

at District of Columbia Stadium, Washington, D.C.

- Date: November 13, 1966
- Game weather: 40 °F (4 °C)
- Game attendance: 50,927
- Box Score

Don Meredith played through a broken rib

Team	Category	Player	Statistics
Cowboys	Passing	Don Meredith	21/29, 406 Yds, 2 TD, INT
Cowboys	Rushing	Dan Reeves	13 Rush, 59 Yds
Cowboys	Receiving	Bob Hayes	9 Rec, 246 Yds, 2 TD
Redskins	Passing	Sonny Jurgensen	26/46, 347 Yds, 3 TD
Redskins	Rushing	A.D. Whitfield	7 Rush, 17 Yds
Redskins	Receiving	Charley Taylor	11 Rec, 199 Yds, 2 TD

Scoring summary

Quarter	Time	Drive			Team	Scoring information	Score	
Quarter	Time	Plays	Yards	TOP	Team	Scoring information	DAL	WAS
1					Redskins	35-yard field goal by Charlie Gogolak	0	3
1					Cowboys	Don Meredith 1-yard touchdown run, Danny Villanueva kick good	7	3
1					Redskins	33-yard field goal by Charlie Gogolak	7	6
2					Cowboys	Bob Hayes 52-yard touchdown reception from Don Meredith, Danny Villanueva kick good	14	6
3					Cowboys	Bob Hayes 95-yard touchdown reception from Don Meredith, Danny Villanueva kick good	21	6
3					Redskins	Jerry Smith 4-yard touchdown reception from Sonny Jurgensen, Charlie Gogolak kick good	21	13
3					Redskins	Charley Taylor 78-yard touchdown reception from Sonny Jurgensen, Charlie Gogolak kick good	21	20
3					Redskins	11-yard field goal by Charlie Gogolak	21	23
4					Cowboys	Dan Reeves 1-yard touchdown run, Danny Villanueva kick good	28	23
4					Redskins	Charley Taylor 18-yard touchdown reception from Sonny Jurgensen, Charlie Gogolak kick good	28	30
4	0:15				Cowboys	20-yard field goal by Danny Villanueva	31	30
"TOP" = time of possession. For other American football terms, see Glossary of American football.							31	30

==== Week 12 vs Browns ====
Week Twelve: Cleveland Browns (7–3) at Dallas Cowboys (7–2–1)

Quarter	1	2	3	4	Total
Browns	0	14	0	0	**14**
**Cowboys**	6	7	6	7	**26**

at Cotton Bowl, Dallas, Texas

- Date: November 24
- Game weather: 71 °F (22 °C)
- Game attendance: 80,259
- Box Score

Game information

**First quarter**

- DAL – Danny Villanueva 11-yard field goal. Cowboys 3-0.
- DAL – Danny Villanueva 31-yard field goal. Cowboys 6-0.

**Second quarter**

- CLE – Leroy Kelly 1-yard run (Lou Groza kick). Browns 7-6.
- DAL – Dan Reeves 6-yard pass from Don Meredith (Danny Villanueva kick). Cowboys 13-7.
- CLE – Ernie Green 16-yard pass from Frank Ryan (Lou Groza kick). Browns 14-13.

**Third quarter**

- DAL – Danny Villanueva 12-yard field goal. Cowboys 16-14.
- DAL – Danny Villanueva 13-yard field goal. Cowboys 19-14.

**Fourth quarter**

- DAL – Don Perkins 9-yard run (Danny Villanueva kick). Cowboys 26-14.

Top passers

- CLE – Frank Ryan – 12/26, 190 yards, TD
- DAL – Don Meredith – 16/24, 131 yards, TD

Top rushers

- CLE – Leroy Kelly – 15 rushes, 115 yards, TD
- DAL – Don Perkins – 23 rushes, 111 yards, TD

**Receiving**

- CLE – Gary Collins – 5 receptions, 92 yards
- DAL – Bob Hayes – 6 receptions, 54 yards

==== Week 15 at New York Giants ====
Week Fifteen: Dallas Cowboys (9-3-1) at New York Giants (1-11-1)

Quarter	1	2	3	4	Total
Cowboys	7	0	0	10	**17**
Giants	0	0	0	7	**7**

at Yankee Stadium, New York City

- Date: December 18
- Game weather: 50 °F (10 °C)
- Box Score

Game information

**First quarter**

- Dallas – George Andrie 6-yard interception return (Villanueva kick), Cowboys 7–0.

**Second quarter**

**Third quarter**

**Fourth quarter**

- New York – Joe Morrison 1-yard rush (Gogolak kick), 7–7.
- Dallas – Bob Hayes 41-yard pass from Craig Morton (Villanueva kick), Cowboys 14–7.
- Dallas – Danny Villanueva 10-yard field goal, Cowboys 17–7.

**Top Passers**

- Cowboys – Craig Morton: 6/9, 88 yds, 1 TD
- Giants – Gary Wood: 14/28, 198 yds, 2 INT

**Top rushers**

- Cowboys – Don Perkins: 10 car, 41 yds
- Giants – Allen Jacobs: 11 car, 28 yds

**Top receivers**

- Cowboys – Bob Hayes: 7 rec, 99 yds,1 TD
- Giants – Joe Morrison: 6 rec, 131 yds

== Postseason ==
Round	Date	Opponent	Result	Game Site	Attendance	Recap
NFL Championship	January 1, 1967	Green Bay Packers	L 27–34	Cotton Bowl	75,504	Recap

=== NFL Championship Game ===
Green Bay Packers 34, Dallas Cowboys 27

Quarter	1	2	3	4	Total
Packers	14	7	7	6	34
Cowboys	14	3	3	7	27

at Cotton Bowl, Dallas, Texas

- Date: Sunday, January 1
- Game attendance: 74,152
- Box Score

Game information

First quarter

- GB – Elijah Pitts 17-yard pass from Bart Starr (Don Chandler kick)
- GB – Jim Grabowski 18-yard fumble return (Don Chandler kick)
- DAL – Dan Reeves 3-yard run (Danny Villanueva kick)
- DAL – Don Perkins 23-yard run (Danny Villanueva kick)

Second quarter

- GB – Carroll Dale 51-yard pass from Bart Starr (Don Chandler kick)
- DAL – Danny Villanueva 11-yard field goal

Third quarter

- DAL – Danny Villanueva 32-yard field goal
- GB – Boyd Dowler 16-yard pass from Bart Starr (Don Chandler kick)

Fourth quarter

- GB – Max McGee 28-yard pass from Bart Starr (kick blocked)
- DAL – Frank Clarke 68-yard pass from Don Meredith (Danny Villanueva kick)

Passing

- GB – Bart Starr 19/28, 304 yards, 4 TD
- DAL – Don Meredith 15/31, 238 yards, TD, INT

Rushing

- GB – Elijah Pitts 12 att, 66 yards
- DAL – Don Perkins 17 att, 108 yards, TD

Receiving

- GB – Carroll Dale 5 rec, 128 yards, TD
- DAL – Frank Clarke 3 rec, 102 yards, TD

Green Bay took an early 14–0 lead on two first-quarter scores; a 17-yard touchdown pass from Bart Starr to Elijah Pitts and an 18-yard fumble return by Jim Grabowski on the ensuing kickoff. The Cowboys tied the score with two touchdowns towards the end of the quarter.

Starr's third touchdown pass of the game gave the Packers a 34–20 lead with 5:20 left in the game, but the Cowboys responded with a 68-yard touchdown pass from Don Meredith to Frank Clarke. Dallas advanced to the Green Bay 22-yard line on their next drive, when a pass interference penalty gave the Cowboys a first down at the Packer 2-yard line. Green Bay's Tom Brown intercepted a Meredith pass in the end zone with 28 seconds left to play to preserve the victory for the Packers.

== Standings ==
NFL Eastern Conference
	W	L	T	PCT	CONF	PF	PA	STK
Dallas Cowboys	10	3	1	.769	9–3–1	445	239	W1
Cleveland Browns	9	5	0	.643	9–4	403	259	W1
Philadelphia Eagles	9	5	0	.643	8–5	326	340	W4
St. Louis Cardinals	8	5	1	.615	7–5–1	264	265	L3
Washington Redskins	7	7	0	.500	7–6	351	355	L1
Pittsburgh Steelers	5	8	1	.385	4–8–1	316	347	W2
Atlanta Falcons	3	11	0	.214	2–5	204	437	L1
New York Giants	1	12	1	.077	1–11–1	263	501	L8

Note: Tie games were not officially counted in the standings until 1972.

== Season recap ==
With the growth in popularity of televised NFL games, the league began looking for a second team in addition to the Detroit Lions, to host an annual Thanksgiving Day game. Every team turned down the offer, except for the Dallas Cowboys. General Manager Tex Schramm recognized this as an opportunity for the franchise to increase its popularity and establish its own Thanksgiving Day game tradition.

In 1966, the Cowboys who had been founded six years earlier, adopted the practice of hosting Thanksgiving games. It is widely rumored that the Cowboys sought a guarantee that they would regularly host Thanksgiving games as a condition of their very first one (since games on days other than Sunday were uncommon at the time and thus high attendance was not a certainty). Since then, the two "traditional" Thanksgiving Day pro football games have been in Detroit and Dallas.

== Statistics ==
=== Team leaders ===
Category	Player(s)	Value	Rank
Passing yards	Don Meredith	2,805	4th
Passing touchdowns	Don Meredith	24	3rd
Rushing yards	Dan Reeves	757	6th
Rushing touchdowns	Dan Reeves/Don Perkins	8	t2nd
Receiving yards	Bob Hayes	1,232	2nd
Receiving touchdowns	Bob Hayes	13	1st
Points	Danny Villanueva	107	2nd
Kickoff return yards	Mel Renfro	487	12th
Punt return yards	Mel Renfro	123	8th
Interceptions	Cornell Green	4	t6th
Sacks	George Andrie	18.5	1st

Note that sack totals from 1960 to 1981 are considered unofficial by the NFL.

== Awards and honors ==
- Don Meredith, Bert Bell Award
