= 1966 NFL Championship Game =

34th NFL championship

Coordinates: 32.78°N 96.76°W

- 1966 NFL Championship Game program
Green Bay Packers (Western) (12–2)	Dallas Cowboys (Eastern) (10–3–1)
34	27
Head coach: Vince Lombardi	Head coach: Tom Landry
	1	2	3	4	Total
GB	14	7	7	6	34
DAL	14	3	3	7	27
- Date: January 1, 1967
- Stadium: Cotton Bowl; Dallas, Texas
- MVP: Bart Starr (quarterback; Green Bay)
- Favorite: Green Bay by 7 points
- Attendance: 74,152

TV in the United States
- Network: CBS
- Announcers: Jack Buck, Ray Scott, Frank Gifford
- Nielsen ratings: 30.3

Radio in the United States
- Network: CBS
- Announcers: Jack Drees, Jim Morse

Location in the United States
Location in Texas

The 1966 NFL Championship Game was the 34th NFL championship, played at the Cotton Bowl in Dallas, Texas. The final game of the 1966 NFL season, it was the last championship game before the inauguration of the NFL playoffs the following year.

It determined the champion of the National Football League (NFL), which met the champion of the American Football League (AFL) in Super Bowl I, then formally referred to as the first AFL–NFL World Championship Game. The Western Conference champion Green Bay Packers (12–2), defending league champions, were hosted by the Dallas Cowboys (10–3–1), the Eastern Conference champions.

At the time, the home field for the NFL Championship Game alternated between the two conferences; even-numbered years were hosted by the Eastern and odd-numbered by the Western. Starting with the 1975 season, playoff sites were determined by regular season record, rather than a rotational basis.

The New Year's college bowl game at the Cotton Bowl for the 1966 season included the SMU Mustangs of Dallas. It was played the day before, New Year's Eve, which required a quick turnaround to transform the natural grass field. The stadium was filled to its 75,504 capacity for both games, but both local teams came up short.

== Background ==
This was the first NFL title game played after the AFL–NFL merger was announced in June 1966. The game was played on January 1, 1967, the second consecutive year that the NFL season ended in January, rather than December. This was the seventh season for the Dallas Cowboys and their first winning record since entering the league in 1960. They were champions of the NFL's Eastern Conference with a 10–3–1 record. The Packers won the Western Conference with a 12–2 record, their eighth consecutive winning season under head coach Vince Lombardi.

Tickets for the game sold for ten dollars, and kickoff was just after 3 p.m. CST, televised by CBS, following the AFL Championship from Buffalo on NBC.

The final score was Green Bay 34, Dallas 27. Two weeks later, Green Bay went on to easily defeat the Kansas City Chiefs in Super Bowl I in Los Angeles.

== Game summary ==
The seasoned Packers, defending champions of the 1965 season, were favored by a touchdown over the talented, but young Cowboys team, who had no players with championship experience and only one player over thirty, linebacker Chuck Howley. The game was expected to be a shootout, and as wary as the Packers were of Cowboys wide-out Bob Hayes, the fastest man in football at the time, Lombardi made the decision before the game not to put double-coverage on the Olympic champion sprinter. It proved to be a good gamble, as Herb Adderley and Bob Jeter held Hayes to only one reception for one yard. Lombardi also installed a special offense for the game, knowing that the Cowboys had spent time preparing to stop plays like the Packers sweep.

Green Bay scored on their opening drive, with Elijah Pitts breaking free for a 32-yard run on the opening play – a misdirection play that was part of Lombardi's special game plan. Later Pitts took a circle route pass over the middle from Bart Starr at the Cowboy 5 and broke a tackle by Warren Livingston to cap a 17-yard touchdown play. Then Cowboys defensive back Mel Renfro fumbled the ensuing kickoff, and Packer rookie Jim Grabowski returned it 18 yards to give Green Bay a 14–0 lead before Dallas's first play. But the Cowboys stormed back with a 13-play drive to score on Dan Reeves's 3-yard rushing touchdown. Then after forcing a punt, they drove 59 yards to tie the game at 14 with a 23-yard touchdown burst by fullback Don Perkins.

Starr broke the tie on the third play of the second quarter with a 51-yard bomb to Carroll Dale over the head of CB Cornell Green. Dallas responded with a 68-yard drive to the Packers 4-yard line, featuring a 40-yard completion from Don Meredith to a wide-open Reeves, but could go no further and settled for an 11-yard Danny Villanueva field goal, cutting their deficit to 21–17. Green Bay had a chance to retake a 7-point lead before halftime, but Don Chandler's 30-yard field goal attempt was blocked by Cowboys tackle Ralph Neely.

Early in the third quarter, Dallas defensive back Warren Livingston recovered a fumble from Pitts on the Cowboys 21-yard line. Meredith then led the team on a 13-play drive to bring the score to within one point, 21–20, on Villanueva's 32-yard field goal. But on Green Bay's next drive, Starr completed a 40-yard pass to Dale, who beat Green to the outside. From the Dallas 16 Starr hit Boyd Dowler cutting across the field for his third touchdown pass of the game, giving the Pack a 28–20 lead going into the fourth quarter. Dallas safety Mike Gaechter upended Dowler after the wide receiver took several steps in the end zone, causing Dowler to leave the game (Dowler was hampered much of the season by a calcium deposit on his shoulder). Bart Starr had to guide an upset Jim Taylor to the Green Bay sideline when the fiery Green Bay fullback started looking for Gaechter.

Late in the final period, Hayes fielded a punt on his own 1-yard line and was tackled inside the 5. Don Meredith hit a cold streak and missed several passes, and a Dallas punt gave Green Bay good field position on the Dallas 48. George Andrie sacked Starr on the first play, but Starr then picked up a key first down with a 24-yard pass to tight end Marv Fleming. Later faced with 3rd and 12, he completed a 16-yard pass to fullback Jim Taylor for a first down. Starr was again sacked on the drive, this time for an 11-yard loss by Willie Townes. But on third and nineteen, the Packers picked up a Cowboy blitz and Starr threw a 28-yard touchdown pass to Max McGee (who replaced the injured Dowler). McGee had told Starr he could beat cornerback Warren Livingston to the outside ("Zig out" pattern). With just 5:20 left, the game appeared to be slipping out of reach for the Cowboys. However, defensive tackle Bob Lilly kept his team in the game by blocking Chandler's extra point attempt, keeping the deficit at 2 scores, 34–20, rather than 3.

Dallas started their comeback attempt on the ensuing drive. Faced with 3rd down and 20, Meredith threw a 68-yard touchdown pass to tight end Frank Clarke, making the score 34–27. Desperately trying to run out the clock with their ensuing possession, Green Bay started out with an 18-yard reception by Fleming on the Packers 46. But on the next play, Starr was sacked for an 8-yard loss by linebacker Dave Edwards. Townes broke up a screen pass on the next play, and then Taylor was stuffed for a loss. Now faced with 4th down, a heavy rush from the Dallas defense caused Chandler's punt to go just 17 yards, giving the Cowboys the ball on the Green Bay 47-yard line with 2:12 remaining.

A 21-yard catch by Clarke and a 4-yard run by Perkins advanced the ball to the Green Bay 22-yard line. Then a pass interference penalty on safety Tom Brown gave the Cowboys a first down at the Packer 2-yard line. Halfback Dan Reeves gained a yard on first down. A crucial mistake on a false start by Jim Boeke penalized the Cowboys back to the Green Bay 6 (nullifying a play where a wide-open Pettis Norman had dropped a pass in the end zone), and Reeves then dropped a pass in the flat on second down. Reeves had been scratched in the eye on his previous run but did not come out of the game in favor of rookie Walt Garrison despite clouded vision, another mental error. Meredith found tight end Pettis Norman on third down to bring Dallas back to the two-yard line, the end making the catch on his knees. On fourth down, the Cowboys attempted a rollout pass. No one on the Cowboys noticed that end Bob Hayes was in the goal line offense instead of Frank Clarke, who was typically used for better blocking. Packer linebacker Dave Robinson recognized the play from films, brushed Hayes aside, stormed into the Cowboy backfield and enveloped Meredith. Somehow Meredith got a wobbly sidearm toss away, but Brown intercepted the pass in the end zone as the intended receiver, Hayes, was surrounded by Packers defenders. Vince Lombardi later congratulated Robinson, but in the next breath criticized him for being out of his assigned position.

Starr completed 19 of 28 passes for 304 yards and 4 touchdowns, with no interceptions, though he was sacked five times. His quarterback rating for the game was a stellar 143.5. Dale caught 5 passes for 128 yards and a score. Pitts led the Packers in rushing with 66 yards and caught a touchdown pass. Meredith finished the game 15/31 for 238 yards, with one touchdown and one interception, while also rushing for 22 yards. Perkins rushed for 108 yards and a score, while Reeves rushed for 47 yards, caught 4 passes for 77 yards, and scored a touchdown.

"I don't know, we haven't played Alabama yet." – Vince Lombardi after being asked what it felt like to be the greatest football team in the world just after winning the 1966 NFL Championship Game. Coincidentally, Bear Bryant's Crimson Tide wrapped up an 11–0 season the next day by routing Nebraska 34–7 in the Sugar Bowl in New Orleans.

With the win, the Packers earned their tenth NFL championship; it was their second in a row and fourth in six seasons under Lombardi, in his eighth year as Green Bay's head coach.

This was the Packers' only post-season win against the Cowboys in the Dallas area until the 2016 season, when they beat them in another tooth and nail game to advance to the NFC Championship Game.

=== Game information ===
Green Bay Packers 34, Dallas Cowboys 27

Quarter	1	2	3	4	Total
Packers	14	7	7	6	34
Cowboys	14	3	3	7	27

at Cotton Bowl, Dallas, Texas

- Date: January 1
- Game time: 3:05 p.m. CST
- Game weather: 55F, overcast
- Game attendance: 74,152
- Referee: Tommy Bell
- TV announcers (CBS): Jack Buck, Ray Scott, Frank Gifford
- Pro Football Reference

Game information
- First quarter
  - GB – Elijah Pitts 17-yard pass from Bart Starr (Don Chandler kick). Packers 7–0
  - GB – Jim Grabowski 18-yard fumble return (Chandler kick). Packers 14–0
  - DAL – Dan Reeves 3-yard rush (Danny Villanueva kick). Packers 14–7
  - DAL – Don Perkins 23-yard rush (Villanueva kick). Tied 14–14
- Second quarter
  - GB – Carroll Dale 51-yard pass from Starr (Chandler kick). Packers 21–14
  - DAL – Danny Villanueva 11-yard field goal. Packers 21–17
- Third quarter
  - DAL – Danny Villanueva 32-yard field goal. Packers 21–20
  - GB – Boyd Dowler 16-yard pass from Starr (Chandler kick). Packers 28–20
- Fourth quarter
  - GB – Max McGee 28-yard pass from Starr (kick blocked). Packers 34–20
  - DAL – Franklin Clarke 68-yard pass from Meredith (Villanueva kick). Packers 34–27

Top passers

- GB – Bart Starr – 19/28, 304 yards, 4 TD
- DAL – Don Meredith – 15/31, 238 yards, 1 TD, 1 INT

Top rushers

- GB – Elijah Pitts – 12 carries, 66 yards
- DAL – Don Perkins – 17 carries, 108 yards, 1 TD

Top receivers

- GB – Carroll Dale – 5 receptions, 128 yards, TD
- DAL – Frank Clarke – 3 receptions, 102 yards, TD

== Officials ==
- Referee: (7) Tommy Bell
- Umpire: (15) Ralph Morcroft
- Head linesman: (30) George Murphy
- Line judge: (24) Bruce Alford
- Back judge: (25) Tom Kelleher
- Field judge: (34) Fritz Graf

The NFL had six game officials in 1966; the line judge was added a season earlier in 1965 and the side judge arrived twelve years later in 1978.

== Players' shares ==
The Packer players each received $8,600 and the Cowboy players about $6,000 each, an increase over the previous year's ($7,500 and $4,600).

Over in the AFL, the winning Kansas City Chiefs split their players' shares for the title game 51 ways for $5,308 each, while the Buffalo Bills split theirs into 47 shares for about $3,800 each.

The upcoming Super Bowl awarded an additional $15,000 per player for the winners and $7,500 each for the losing team.

== See also ==
- 1966 NFL season
- History of the NFL championship
- Super Bowl I
- 1966 American Football League Championship Game
- Cowboys–Packers rivalry
