= Lee Folkins =

American football player (born 1939)

No. 81, 83, 80, 84
- Position: Tight end

Personal information
- Born: July 4, 1939 (age 87); Wallace, Idaho, U.S.
- Listed height: 6 ft 5 in (1.96 m)
- Listed weight: 215 lb (98 kg)

Career information
- High school: Roosevelt (Seattle, Washington)
- College: Washington
- NFL draft: 1961: 6th round, 82nd overall pick

Career history
- Green Bay Packers (1961); Dallas Cowboys (1962–1964); Pittsburgh Steelers (1965)

Awards and highlights
- NFL champion (1961); Pro Bowl (1963)

Career NFL statistics
- Receptions: 80
- Receiving yards: 1,042
- Receiving touchdowns: 10
- Punting yards: 497
- Stats at Pro Football Reference

Lloyd Leroy Folkins (born July 4, 1939) is an American former professional football player who was a tight end in the National Football League (NFL) for the Green Bay Packers, Dallas Cowboys and Pittsburgh Steelers. He played college football for the Washington Huskies.

== Early life ==
Folkins attended Roosevelt High School, before accepting a football scholarship from the University of Washington.

Folkins started as a sophomore playing both offense and defense, standing out as an offensive end, where he eventually formed a massive duo with John Meyers, with both standing 6–5 and over 200 pounds each.

In 1959, Folkins helped the Huskies reach the 1960 Rose Bowl, winning it for the first time in school history, with a 44-8 upset against the University of Wisconsin.

In 1960, Folkins was a preseason All-American candidate and again helped the Huskies reach the 1961 Rose Bowl, which they won 17-7 against the University of Minnesota.

== Professional career ==
=== Green Bay Packers ===
Folkins was selected by the Green Bay Packers in the sixth round (82nd overall) of the 1961 NFL draft. He was converted to play tight end and was a reserve behind Ron Kramer. Folkins was part of the Packers 1961 World NFL Championship Team, but spent most of his time playing special teams.

On 4 September 1962, Folkins was traded to the Dallas Cowboys in exchange for an eighth-round draft choice (#104-Keith Kinderman).

=== Dallas Cowboys ===
Folkins started the 1962 season as the backup for Pettis Norman at tight end, but by the fourth game he had won the starter position and developed into a very good pass receiver, catching 39 receptions for 536 yards and six touchdowns. In the 1962 Chicago College All-Star Game, Folkins swung at a collegiate player, but connected instead with the head official, rendering him unconscious.

Folkins made the Pro Bowl in 1963 after making 31 catches for 407 yards and 4 touchdowns.

After catching 70 passes in his first two seasons in Dallas, Folkins caught only five passes in 1964 after being passed on the depth chart by Pettis Norman. He played mainly on special teams and was forced to be the Cowboys punter in the last 2 games of the season (15 punts for 497 yards). On 6 September 1965, Folkins was traded to the Pittsburgh Steelers in exchange for a twelfth round draft choice (#173-Les Shy). Shortly after being traded by the Cowboys to the Steelers, he returned to play in the Old Cotton Bowl at Fair Park in Dallas. Folkins recovered a fumble during that game and ran along the Cowboy sideline, holding out the football toward Coach Tom Landry and the Cowboy Team, as he ran for a touchdown. Folkins worked for Tecon Corporation, owned by the Murchison Brothers who owned the Cowboys, while with that team.

=== Pittsburgh Steelers ===
In 1965, Folkins didn't have a big impact with the Pittsburgh Steelers because of recurring injuries. But he played a part in beating the Cowboys that season; he recovered a Bob Hayes kickoff fumble that he returned for a touchdown and afterwards tossed the ball to a surprised Tom Landry.

After playing in only 8 games and catching just five receptions, Folkins decided to the retire at the end of the 1965 season. He played for five years, with 80 receptions for 1,042 yards and 10 touchdowns.

== Personal life ==
Folkins survived a 66,000 volt jolt, that happened during a work accident.
