= Cornell Green (defensive back) =

American football player (1940–2026)

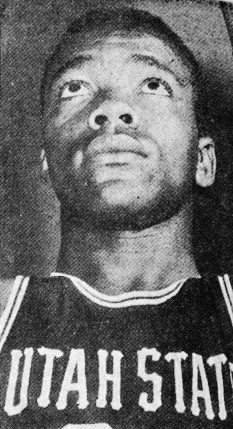
- Green, circa 1960

No. 34
- Positions: Cornerback, safety

Personal information
- Born: February 10, 1940; Oklahoma City, Oklahoma, U.S.
- Died: October 21, 2026 (aged 86)
- Listed height: 6 ft 3 in (1.91 m)
- Listed weight: 208 lb (94 kg)

Career information
- High school: El Cerrito (El Cerrito, California)
- College: Utah State
- NFL draft: 1962: undrafted

Career history

Playing
- Dallas Cowboys (1962–1974)

Operations
- Denver Broncos (1987-2015) Scout

Awards and highlights
- Super Bowl champion (VI); 5× Pro Bowl (1965, 1966, 1967, 1971, 1972); 3× First-team All-Pro (1966, 1967, 1969); Second-team All-Pro (1968); NFL All-Rookie Team (1962); Dallas Cowboys 25th Anniversary Team; 3× All-Skyline (1960, 1961, 1962); Skyline Conference MVP (1960); 2× All-American (1961, 1962); Utah State University Hall of Fame; Utah State Aggies No. 24 Retired

Career NFL statistics
- Interceptions: 34
- Interception yards: 552
- Total touchdowns: 4
- Fumble recoveries: 7
- Stats at Pro Football Reference

Cornell M. Green (February 10, 1940 – October 21, 2026) was an American professional football player and scout who was a defensive back for 13 seasons with the Dallas Cowboys of the National Football League (NFL). He attended Utah State University, but did not play college football. Rather, he was a leading scorer and rebounder in the Skyline Conference and a two-time honorable mention All-American as a basketball player for the Aggies; where he also was named to the West Region All-Star team in the 1962 NCAA University Division basketball tournament. Green was selected in the fifth round of the 1962 NBA draft, but not selected in the NFL draft; and was signed by scout Gil Brandt of the Cowboys in 1962 as a free agent.

During Green's NFL career, he started in two NFL championship games before the merger of the American Football League with the NFL; and then started in two Super Bowls, winning with the Cowboys in Super Bowl VI. He was chosen to play in the Pro Bowl five times, and was a first- or second-team All-Pro selection four times. He was a first-team All-Pro in 1967, when the Cowboys' defensive unit first became known as the "Doomsday Defense". He played cornerback the first eight seasons of his NFL career and strong safety for his last five seasons; being selected to play in the Pro Bowl at both positions. During his regular season and playoff career, he returned three interceptions and two fumble recoveries for touchdowns. On special teams, he blocked eight field goal attempts during his career, and blocked 10 kicks overall.

Green never missed a regular season or playoff game over his 13-year career; starting in 170 regular season games and 15 playoff games. He started in 25 consecutive games from December 1962 to November 1964 until he was unable to start a November 1964 game due to a rib injury (though still playing in the game). Green then started in every game for the remainder of his career (140 consecutive regular season games and 15 playoff games).

He spent over three decades as a full-time NFL scout for the Cowboys and Denver Broncos, and five offseasons in a part-time scouting role for the Cowboys before his retirement as a player. In 2010, he received the AFC Scout of the Year Award from the Fritz Pollard Alliance. During his 28 years as a Broncos' scout, the Broncos won 11 division titles, six AFC Championships, and three Super Bowls.

== Early life ==
Green was born in Oklahoma City, Oklahoma, on February 10, 1940. He was one of five sons raised by Elijah and Gladys Green. His oldest brother, Pumpsie Green, became the first African American baseball player on the Boston Red Sox, the last team in Major League Baseball to integrate. Another older brother, Credell Green, played football at the University of Washington where he was an All-American and once rushed for 258 yards in a game; and later was drafted by the Green Bay Packers but released before the 1957 NFL season.

Green was raised in northern California in Richmond and attended El Cerrito High School. He played on the basketball team from 1955 to 1957, and was All-ACAL (1956, 1957), All-Northern California (1956, 1957), and All-State in 1957. He played one year on the football team in 1956 at fullback, and was reportedly All-State in football as well. In summer basketball leagues, he played against future NBA players such as Bill Russell, K. C. Jones, and Paul Silas. In 2009, Green was named to the inaugural class of the El Cerrito High School Athletics Hall of Fame.

== College basketball career ==
Green had been offered college scholarships in football, but thought it unwise to play two sports in college and believed he was a better basketball player than football player. From 1958 to 1959, Green played basketball at Contra Costa College, earning All-State honors. He transferred to Utah State University, where he played basketball for the Aggies in the Skyline Conference (officially the Mountain State Athletic Conference, which was dissolved in June 1962). Green earned All-American honors (1961, 1962) as well as All-Skyline Conference honors in each of his three years (1960 to 1962).

The 6 ft 4 in (1.93 m) Green played forward for the Aggies, averaging a double-double during his Aggie career (22.5 points per game and 12.7 rebounds per game). In 1959–60 as a sophomore, Green led the Skyline Conference in scoring (21.2 points per game) and total rebounds (403), and was second in rebounds per game (13.9). He was the Skyline Conference’s Most Valuable Player as a sophomore. The Associated Press (AP) and United Press International named him first-team All-Skyline Conference in 1960. UPI named him an honorable mention All-American in 1960.

Green led the conference in scoring again as a junior (1960–61) with a 20.4 points per game average, and was fourth in rebounding at 12.4 rebounds per game. United Press International named Green an honorable mention All-American in March 1961. The AP named him first-team All-Skyline Conference in 1961. Coach LaDell Andersen named Green team captain for the 1961–62 season; Green's senior season. As a senior, he was second in the conference in scoring (25.7 points per game) and rebounding (11.8 rebounds per game). In March 1962, the Associated Press named him an honorable mention All-American. The Helms Athletic Foundation selected Green as a second-team All-American in 1962. The AP and UPI (unanimously) named him first-team All-Skyline Conference in 1962.

In Green's three seasons with the Aggies, Utah State went to the National Invitation Tournament (NIT) in 1960 (reaching the semifinals) and to the NCAA University Division basketball tournament in 1962. In the Aggies' NIT first-round 73–72 overtime win over the Villanova Wildcats, Green scored 18 points in the first half; and was double-teamed the entire second half, ending the game with 26 points. Green led the Aggies with 19 points in their NIT semifinal loss to the Providence Friars, and he had 26 points in a victory over St. Bonaventure for third place in the NIT. The AP named Green to its second-team All-NIT team. The Aggies ended the 1959–60 season with a 24–5 record, and ranked eighth in the final Associated Press Poll, while ranking seventh in the Coaches' Poll. These remain the highest year-end basketball rankings in school history.

The Aggies had a 22–7 record in Green's senior year (1961–62), and reached the 1962 NCAA tournament. In the first game of the tournament's West Region competition, Green had 29 points in a win over Arizona State. He scored 26 points in an 11-point loss to UCLA in the West Region semifinals. Green scored 20 points in the third-place game; a loss to Pepperdine. Green was named to the West Region tournament's All-Star team.

Green set the Aggie career rebounding record with 1,067, which still stands (as of 2026). He is also the sixth leading scorer in Utah State history with 1,890 points. Green produced some of the best individual seasons in school history, as his 745 points in 1962 are still in fourth place. Green's 403 rebounds and 13.9 rebounds per game average in 1960 remain school records for a season (as of 2026).

== Professional football career ==
Green was a college basketball player who never played a down of college football. The Chicago Packers of the National Basketball Association (NBA) drafted Green in the fifth round of the 1962 NBA draft, 37th overall. He did not play in the NBA, but instead went on to a thirteen-year career in the NFL with the Dallas Cowboys. At the time he chose to pursue a career in professional football with the Cowboys, Green stated that he was concerned that at only 6 ft 4 in (1.93 m), it would be difficult for him to play the forward position in the NBA as he had in college because he would not be tall enough for professional basketball at forward. He was not drafted to play professional football, but was signed by scout Gil Brandt as an undrafted free agent to play for the Dallas Cowboys, who converted him into a defensive back in the National Football League (NFL).

In one telling, Brandt and Cowboys' head coach Tom Landry believed good athletes could be scouted for the Cowboys at the NCAA basketball tournament's Final Four. The Cowboys set up a hospitality suite at the Final Four site in 1962, where Utah State coach LaDell Andersen, who also represented Green, recommended Green to Brandt. Brandt later went to Logan, Utah to meet Green, and promised Green a $1,000 signing bonus. Green was told he could keep $250 simply for agreeing not to sign with another team (meaning an American Football League team). This was one of the innovative personnel decisions the Cowboys were known for. (In 1962, the Cowboys also tried out Washington State University basketball and track star Charley Sells, along with Green; and two years later converted Pete Gent from college basketball to football.)

In another variation, Gil Brandt was scouting at Utah State and saw Green pIay basketball; and also was aware Green had played high school football. He approached Green about playing for the Cowboys. In yet another version, it was Green that approached Gil Brandt at a Utah State football game and asked for a chance to try out for the Cowboys.

In early May 1962, the Chicago Packers expressed their interest in signing Green. Instead, Green signed a contract to play for the Cowboys in late May 1962. At the time of the Cowboys' signing, Brandt stated that the Cowboys had plans for Green as a receiver and defensive back. Although he was one of the few players signed in the NFL who had not played college football, Brandt believed "'Green has the natural ability, agility and determination to be an outstanding athlete for us'". Green later said the most important thing in his successfully going from basketball to playing football was not to fear being hit.

When he reported to the Cowboys' training camp in Marquette, Michigan, in 1962, he did not believe he would make the team, but attending training camp meant he could earn the remaining $750 of his signing bonus. With the assumption the team would cut him, he initially did not give much effort. "I figured I’d go there for a week ... and they’d cut me", Green later said. Green was so inexperienced at football that he wore his hip pads backward for three games during the pre-season; which was only discovered when he complained about the discomfort.

After the Cowboys' veteran players later joined in the team's 1962 training camp, however, Green realized he was a better athlete than most of them and could in fact make the team; and made up his mind to do so. Green was reported as being a surprise in training camp, making the Cowboys roster as a defensive back; an area where the team was lacking in quality players. Green's 6 ft 4 in height and agility developed in playing basketball were said to have provided him advantages that helped make up for his lack of experience and knowledge in playing defensive back. He reportedly weighed 210 lb (95.3 kg) in training camp.

Green played in all 14 games for the Cowboys in 1962; starting the final three games of the season at left cornerback. He was selected to the NFL All-Rookie team in 1962. In his first start on December 2 against the Cleveland Browns, he was described in the local media as doing an accomplished job and staying with Browns' receiver Ray Renfro throughout the game.

In 1963, Green was described as being 6 ft 4 in 220 lb (99.8 kg), and unusually large for a cornerback. Green started all 14 games in 1963. That season, Green became the Cowboys' full-time starter at left cornerback setting a career best with seven interceptions. He had two interceptions against future Hall of Fame quarterback Y. A. Tittle of the New York Giants in an early December 1963 game, both of which ultimately led to Cowboys' touchdowns. He also had one fumble recovery that season, which he returned 20 yards for a touchdown after recovering a Jim Brown fumble in a game against the Cleveland Browns.

In 1964, Green started 13 of the 14 games in which he played at left cornerback. He did not start on November 8, 1964 against the New York Giants because of a rib cartilage injury; though he played in the game. He had started 25 consecutive games before that injury; and after that game would go on to start every Cowboys' regular season game until he retired after the 1974 season.

Green was selected to play in the Pro Bowl for the first time in the 1965 season. He had three interceptions and two fumble recoveries that year. He again returned a fumble for a touchdown, this time against the Washington Redskins on a Charley Taylor fumble. On special teams, Green blocked a field goal attempt in a December 1965 game against the New York Giants to secure a win for the Cowboys. Earlier that same month, Green had blocked a Sam Baker field goal attempt against the Philadelphia Eagles.

The Cowboys had a winning season for the first time in 1966 (10–3–1). Green was selected to play in the Pro Bowl again, and was named first-team All-Pro by the Associated Press (AP) and Newspaper Enterprise Association (NEA) and second-team All-Pro by United Press International (UPI). He had four interceptions and one fumble recovery that season. Green intercepted two passes during the first game of the 1966 season, against the New York Giants; returning one 41 yards for a touchdown. He started in the Cowboys 34–27 loss to the Green Bay Packers in the 1966 NFL Championship Game. One of the key plays in the game occurred when Packers' receiver Carroll Dale got behind Green and scored on a 51-yard touchdown pass from Bart Starr.

In 1967, Green had seven interceptions for the second time in his career. He made the Pro Bowl for a third consecutive season. The AP and NEA named his first-team All-Pro for the second consecutive season, and UPI likewise selected him as a first-team All-Pro. He was part of a Cowboys' defensive unit that season that was nicknamed the "Doomsday Defense" because they gave up so few yards. The Cowboys defeated the Cleveland Browns 54–14 in the first round of the 1967 NFL playoffs, with Green intercepting a pass and returning it 60 yards for a touchdown. The Cowboys then lost in the 1967 NFL Championship Game to the Packers, 21–17, on the game's final play. That game came to be known as the Ice Bowl, being played in −15 °F (−26 °C) weather at Lambeau Field in Green Bay on December 31, 1967.

In 1968, Green had four interceptions. On October 20, he intercepted a Joe Kapp pass against the Minnesota Vikings and returned it 55 yards for a touchdown. He was selected first-team All-Pro for the third consecutive season by the NEA, second-team All-NFL/AFL by the Pro Football Writers of America, and second-team All-Pro by the AP and UPI. In 1969, Green had two interceptions. UPI selected him first-team All-Pro, and the AP, NEA, and Pro Football Writers named him second team All-Pro.

The 1969 Cowboys' defensive backfield included Green at left cornerback, Phil Clark at right cornerback, future Hall of Fame defensive back Mel Renfro at free safety, and Mike Gaechter at strong safety. The Cowboys lost to the Cleveland Browns in the first round of the 1969–70 NFL playoffs, 38–14; and their pass defense was criticized after the game. They next lost to the Los Angeles Rams in the Playoff Bowl, 31–0. Gaechter had been the Cowboys' starting strong safety from 1966 to 1969, but suffered a career-ending Achilles tendon injury in the last Playoff Bowl on January 2, 1970. The Cowboys traded Clark in January 1970 to the Chicago Bears. Going into the 1970 season, the Cowboys' defensive backfield was described as a major problem.

Green had played cornerback during his first eight seasons (1962 to 1969), while leading the team in interceptions four times and being selected numerous times to Pro Bowl and All-Pro teams as a cornerback. However, in 1970, Cowboys coach Tom Landry moved Green to strong safety; where Green played for the final five years of his NFL career. Landry first moved Green to strong safety in early September during the 1970 pre-season. In addition, on September 1, 1970, the Cowboys traded with the Packers for future Hall of Fame cornerback Herb Adderley.

In the Cowboy's final 1970 pre-season game, Landry used Green and Renfro at safety, with Adderley as one cornerback and Mark Washington as the other cornerback. Before the first game of the 1970 season, he rearranged the backfield to use Renfro at right cornerback, Adderley at left cornerback, Green at strong safety, and rookie undrafted free agent Cliff Harris at free safety. The cornerback position had needed an upgrade, and Landry moved Renfro to play cornerback. Given that Renfro was an All-Pro in 1969 at safety, the move may have seemed to be an odd one, but Renfro was matched with Herb Adderley, and the duo was better than Green and Clark. Renfro went to the Pro Bowl his first four seasons playing right cornerback, and Adderley retired after three seasons with the Cowboys.

During the course of the 1970 season, Landry used Adderley, Green, and Renfro at these positions in every game; with Harris splitting time at free safety with the rookie third-round draft pick Charlie Waters. Green had one interception and one fumble recovery in 1970 at strong safety. In 1971, he was selected to play in the Pro Bowl at safety, and was named first-team All-Conference by the Associated Press. After the switch, the Cowboys went to two consecutive Super Bowls, losing to the Baltimore Colts in Super Bowl V, and defeating the Miami Dolphins in Super Bowl VI; Green starting in both games. In Super Bowl V, he stripped the ball from receiver Eddie Hinton and the Cowboys recovered; but the Cowboys ultimately lost the game 16–13 to the Colts in the game's final seconds.

Green was again selected to play in the Pro Bowl at safety in 1972, and UPI named Green second-team All-Conference. After two more seasons starting at strong safety, Green retired as a player in September 1975; after he saw for himself that there were players on the team who he felt could perform the job at strong safety, such as Charlie Waters (who went on to replace Green that season, and to be the team's starting strong safety until 1981). He had 34 interceptions and seven fumble recoveries during his regular season career, returning two interceptions and two fumble recoveries for touchdowns. He also had a playoff interception that he returned for a touchdown.

Cowboys head coach Tom Landry said of Green, "He had the athletic skills from basketball to become a fine defensive back. His only transition was playing a sport where you could tackle someone with the ball, and Cornell never had a problem dealing with that". Green became an integral player in Tom Landry’s intricate defensive schemes, and was feared by other teams during his career; though he arguably could have had more interceptions. Gil Brandt said "if Cornell had any kind of hands, he would’ve had three times as many interceptions as he got ... and the guy played basketball in college".

Green's teammates nicknamed him "Sweet Lips" because of his speaking propensity. He was also known as "Cornie" to his teammates. He never missed a game in 13 seasons. He played in 182 regular season games, starting 170. He also started in 15 playoff games for the Cowboys. From December 2, 1962 (the 12th game of the 1962 season) through December 14, 1974, the only game he did not start occurred on November 8, 1964 against the New York Giants because of a rib cartilage injury; though he played in the game. He had started 25 consecutive games before that injury. After that game, Green started the remaining five games of the 1964 season, and the next 140 regular season games of his career. He made five Pro Bowls at two different positions: cornerback and strong safety. He was selected first- or second-team All-Pro from 1966 to 1969. He is sixth in career interceptions (34) in Cowboys' history. He holds the Cowboys' record for blocked kicks (10), including eight blocked field goal attempts.

== Scouting career ==
In 1970, Green began scouting for the Dallas Cowboys during the post-season while still an active player; and worked in the Cowboys' office during the off-seasons for five years in this role at the time he retired. After retiring in September 1975, he continued as a full-time scout for the Cowboys through 1979. After scouting, he entered private business until joining the Denver Broncos in 1987. Overall, he spent 35 years scouting in the NFL, and 28 seasons doing it with the Broncos. In 2010, he received the AFC Scout of the Year Award from the Fritz Pollard Alliance.

Green joined the Broncos as a scout under his former Cowboys' teammate, Broncos' head coach Dan Reeves. The Broncos made Green their assistant director of player personnel in 1994. During his tenure as a Broncos' scout (1987 to 2015), the Broncos won over 60 percent of their games, 11 division titles, six AFC Championships and three Super Bowls. Broncos' general manager Ted Sundquist said of Green in 2005

He has had his stamp on just about everybody we have brought in here . . . He has seen thousands and thousands of football players. I learned from him. How do you replace his nearly 30 years of scouting relationships and knowledge? You don't. He opened doors that otherwise would not have been open for our club.

== Legacy and honors ==
In 1993, Green was inducted into the inaugural class of the Utah State University Intercollegiate Athletics Hall Of Fame. His No. 24 jersey reportedly has been retired by Utah State. In 2001, he was inducted into the State of Utah Basketball Hall of Fame. In 2002, he was inducted into the Texas Black Sports Hall of Fame. He was named to the Aggies' All-Century Team in 2005.

In 1985, he was named to the Dallas Cowboys 25th Anniversary Team. In 2017, the Professional Football Researchers Association named Green to the PFRA Hall of Very Good Class of 2017. In 2020, Green was ranked number 23 on the list of the 60 greatest Cowboys players, chosen as part of the team's celebrating its 60th anniversary. Green was also part of the legendary Doomsday Defense’s first generation. Cowboys' Hall of Fame defensive lineman Bob Lilly called Green "'probably the most underrated player the Cowboys have ever had'".

== Personal life and death ==
For nearly six decades Green was married to Betty Green. The Greens had two sons and three granddaughters.

Cornell Green died on October 21, 2026, at the age of 86.
