= Don Perkins =

American football player (1938–2022)

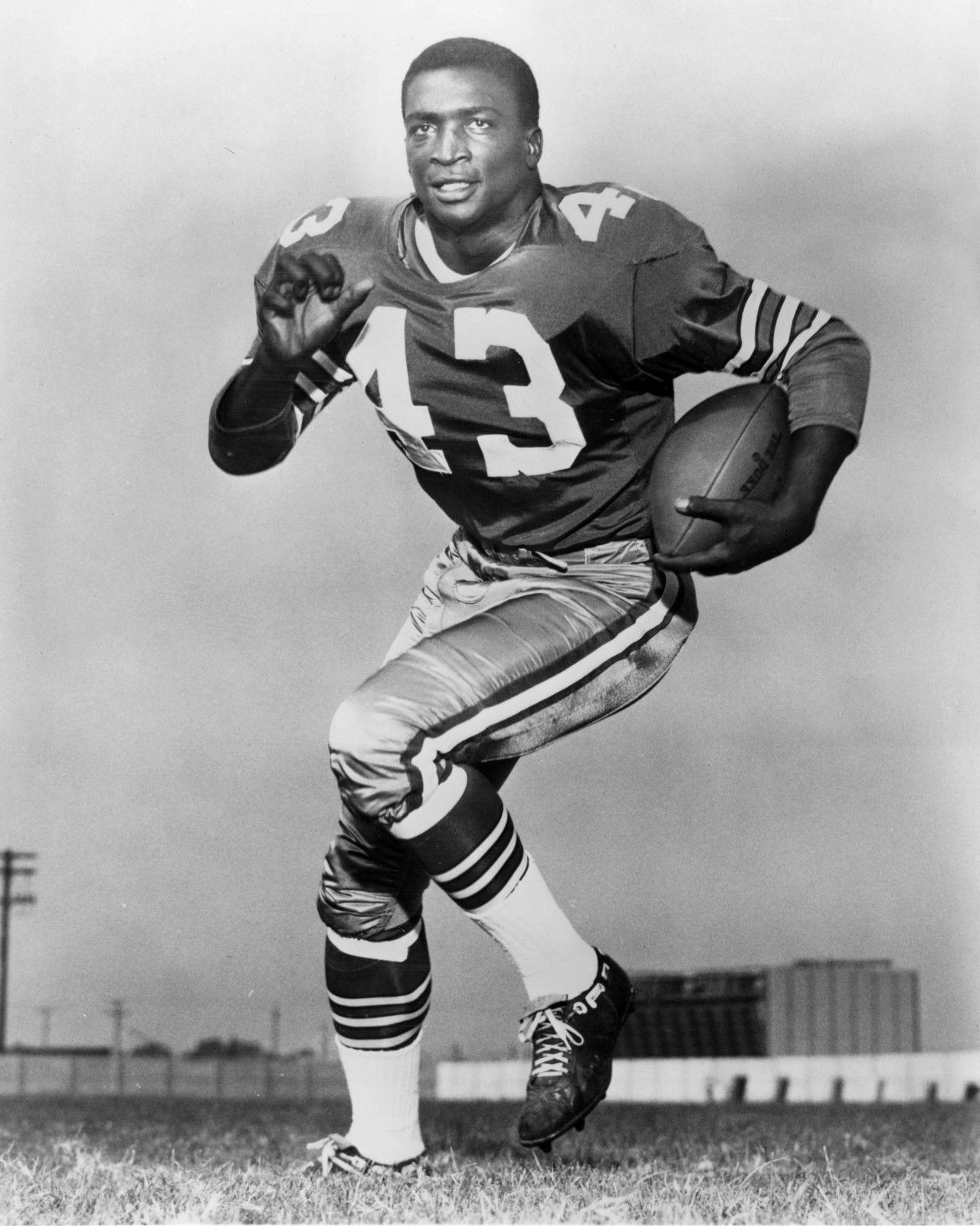
- Perkins circa 1966

No. 43
- Position: Fullback

Personal information
- Born: March 4, 1938; Waterloo, Iowa, U.S.
- Died: June 9, 2022 (aged 84)
- Listed height: 5 ft 10 in (1.78 m)
- Listed weight: 204 lb (93 kg)

Career information
- High school: Waterloo West
- College: New Mexico
- NFL draft: 1960: 9th round, 106th overall pick
- AFL draft: 1960: 1st round

Career history
- Baltimore Colts (1960)*; Dallas Cowboys (1961–1968)
- * Offseason or practice squad member only

Awards and highlights
- NFL Rookie of the Year (1961); 3× All-Pro (1962, 1967, 1968); 6× Pro Bowl (1961–1963, 1966–1968); Dallas Cowboys Ring of Honor; 2× Third-team All-American (1958, 1959); Skyline Sophomore of the Year (1957); 3× All-Skyline (1957, 1958, 1959)

Career NFL statistics
- Rushing yards: 6,217
- Rushing average: 4.1
- Rushing touchdowns: 42
- Receptions: 146
- Receiving yards: 1,310
- Receiving touchdowns: 3
- Stats at Pro Football Reference

Donald Anthony Perkins (March 4, 1938 – June 9, 2022) was an American professional football player who was a fullback in the National Football League (NFL) for the Dallas Cowboys. He played college football at the University of New Mexico.

== Early life ==
Perkins was born on March 4, 1938, in Waterloo, Iowa, and was raised in the segregated part of Waterloo. Perkins earned eight letters for Waterloo West High School, four each in football and track (sprinter). He also played basketball. Perkins captained the track team by the time he was a junior.

In 1955, his football team went undefeated and Perkins was selected first-team All-State as a halfback, while playing both offense and defense. Perkins, an African American, was elected president of the student body during his senior year, extraordinary for a barely integrated school.

== College career ==
Perkins played varsity college football at the University of New Mexico in Albuquerque (1957-1959), where he played halfback and defensive back as a two-way player. He was a two-time first-team All-Skyline Conference selection (1958-59), and a second-team selection as a sophomore in 1957. He was also named the Skyline Sophomore of the Year in 1957, when he was 11th in the nation in rushing with 744 yards on 122 attempts, which led the Skyline conference. In 1959, he led the nation in kickoff returns, with a 34.7 yards per return average.

In 1959, he also received third-team All-American honors. He was named Associated Press (AP) and United Press International (UPI) Back of the Week for November 21, 1959, when he rushed for 126 yards, had a 64-yard touchdown reception, and scored three touchdowns against Air Force. NMU came from behind to win the game 28–27.

The head coach at New Mexico was future Hall of Famer Marv Levy, who has stated on several occasions that Perkins was one of the greatest players he ever coached. He also mentioned Perkins in his Hall of Fame induction speech in Canton, Ohio. When Perkins first came to Albuquerque and could not find a place to live because of racial segregation, Levy took Perkins into his home.

As a sophomore, he set a school record when he rushed for 187 yards against Colorado State, which stood for 11 years. His 85-yard touchdown run that year against Arizona was second best in at least 65 seasons. Perkins led the team in rushing in 1957 (744 yards/6.6 yards per carry) and 1958 (621 yards/5.5 yards per carry). He led the team in receiving in 1957 and 1959, and was the first New Mexico player to have both a 100-yard rushing and receiving game in the same season. He had eleven touchdowns his senior year.

At the end of the 2021 season, he was one of only three Lobos to break 2,000 career rushing yards in a three-year career. His career total 3,466 all-purpose yards was a Lobo record for 13 years. Through 2021, he holds the career kickoff return average record of 30.7 yards.

Perkins set 12 records as a three-year halfback starter. The school retired his number (43) when he completed his career – a first in UNM history. Through 2024, he ranks 17th in the Lobos' career rushing list with 2,001 yards, which was a school record until the 1970s; and 13th in combined rushing and receiving yards. He was inducted into the New Mexico Sports Hall of Fame in 1974, and was in the inaugural class of the University of New Mexico Hall of Honor. Perkins name is in the Lobo Football Ring of Honor inside University Stadium, and his picture is one of four outside the stadium.

== Professional career ==
The Dallas Cowboys franchise was admitted to the league too late to participate in the 1960 NFL draft in November 1959, so they signed Perkins to a personal-services contract for a $1,500 bonus and a $10,000 salary. This meant he would play for the Cowboys if and when they received an NFL franchise. Although he was selected in the ninth round of the NFL draft by the Baltimore Colts, the league honored the contract, but made the Cowboys compensate the Colts with a ninth-round draft pick (#116-Roy Walker) in the 1962 NFL draft.

Perkins sat out the entire 1960 season with a broken foot (fifth metatarsal) he suffered in training camp, so he began playing with the Cowboys in 1961 as a rookie. He lacked long-distance speed, but made up for it with outstanding quickness and balance. He finished with 815 rushing yards (sixth among league leaders) and 4 touchdowns, earning NFL Rookie of the Year and Pro Bowl honors. He was third in AP and UPI voting for the NFL's 1961 Rookie of the Year (behind Mike Ditka and Fran Tarkenton).

Not only was Perkins considered a superb blocker, he also finished in the NFL's top 10 rushing in each of his eight seasons in the league. On September 24, 1961, he became the first running back in Cowboys' history to run for 100 yards in a game, when he rushed for 108 yards on 17 carries against the expansion Minnesota Vikings.

Perkins's best year was in 1962, when he rushed for 945 yards and seven touchdowns, becoming the first Cowboy, along with linebacker Jerry Tubbs, to make the All-Pro team. He went from being on losing and mediocre teams, to playing in the NFL championship games against the Green Bay Packers in 1966 and 1967. In the 1966 game, he rushed for 108 yards and one touchdown. In the 1967 game, known as the Ice Bowl, with wind chill temperatures as low as -48 degrees, he led all runners with 51 rushing yards.

Even though he played the fullback position at 5 ft 10 in (1.78 m) and 204 pounds (93 kg), his ten career 100-yard games ranks fourth in club history. He led the Dallas Cowboys in rushing in seven of his eight seasons, including five consecutive seasons, and also led or co-led them in rushing touchdowns in six of his eight seasons. In 1966, Dan Reeves rushed for 757 yards to 726 yards for Perkins. From 1964 through 1968, he never rushed for less than 690 yards, and in 1967 and 1968, he rushed for 823 yards and 836 yards respectively, with his highest career rushing average (4.4 yards per carry) coming in 1968. He was coming off his two best all-around seasons when he decided to retire prior to the 1969 season.

Perkins ranks fourth on the Cowboys' all-time rushing yards list (behind Emmitt Smith, Tony Dorsett, and Ezekiel Elliott), and fifth on the rushing touchdowns list, behind Smith, Dorsett, Marion Barber III, and Elliott. He was selected to six Pro Bowls, one first-team All-Pro team (1962), and was named second-team All-Pro as well (1967), while gaining a reputation in the NFL for his courage and resolve on some of worst teams in Dallas Cowboys history. In 1968, he helped end the Cowboys practice of segregating players when traveling to hotels.

"Perkins was in the toughest times", Cowboys head coach Tom Landry once told NFL Films: "The guy was a remarkable runner, a great pass blocker and one of the best players in our history." Walt Garrison, who replaced him in the starting lineup, once said, "Don Perkins was the best fullback the Dallas Cowboys ever had".

Perkins retired at the end of 1968 having led all active players in rushing yards since the retirement of Jim Taylor, and was fifth in NFL history with 6,217. He was inducted into the Cowboys Ring of Honor at Texas Stadium alongside his quarterback Don Meredith in 1976. Only Bob Lilly was inducted ahead of them, in 1975. He was one of four former players asked to speak at Tom Landry's funeral.

In 2006, he was inducted into the Texas Sports Hall of Fame.

The Professional Football Researchers Association named Perkins to the PRFA Hall of Very Good Class of 2016.

== NFL career statistics ==
Legend
**Bold**	Career high

Year	Team	Games		Rushing						Receiving					Fumbles	
Year	Team	GP	GS	Att	Yds	Avg	Y/G	Lng	TD	Rec	Yds	Avg	Lng	TD	Fum	FR
1961	DAL	**14**	**14**	200	815	4.1	58.2	47	4	**32**	**298**	9.3	38	1	**5**	**4**
1962	DAL	**14**	**14**	**222**	**945**	4.3	**67.5**	35	7	13	104	8.0	21	0	2	0
1963	DAL	11	10	149	614	4.1	55.8	19	7	14	84	6.0	19	0	–	–
1964	DAL	13	13	174	768	**4.4**	59.1	**59**	6	15	155	10.3	37	0	4	2
1965	DAL	13	13	177	690	3.9	53.1	43	0	14	142	10.1	27	0	2	1
1966	DAL	**14**	**14**	186	726	3.9	51.9	24	**8**	23	231	10.0	**39**	0	1	1
1967	DAL	**14**	**14**	201	823	4.1	58.8	30	6	18	116	6.4	15	0	1	0
1968	DAL	**14**	**14**	191	836	**4.4**	59.7	28	4	17	180	**10.6**	24	**2**	3	0
Career		107	106	1,500	6,217	4.1	58.1	59	42	146	1,310	9.0	39	3	18	8

== Personal life and death ==
Perkins was a football analyst for CBS Sports, ABC Sports, and other television and radio networks. He was the director of the Work Incentive Program for the State of New Mexico Department of Human Services from 1972 to 1985. He served on both the executive board of US West and the Board of Trustees for University Hospital from 1990 to 1993. He was a member of the Northwest Mesa Branch of the NAACP.

A father of four children and grandfather of eleven, Perkins was active in local theater, public speaking, and broadcasting at the local and national levels. He retired in the city of Albuquerque.

Perkins died on June 9, 2022, aged 84.

== See also ==
- List of NCAA major college yearly punt and kickoff return leaders
