= Frank Clarke (American football) =

American football player (1934–2018)

No. 82
- Positions: Wide receiver, tight end

Personal information
- Born: February 7, 1934; Beloit, Wisconsin, U.S.
- Died: July 25, 2018 (aged 84); McKinney, Texas, U.S.
- Listed height: 6 ft 1 in (1.85 m)
- Listed weight: 215 lb (98 kg)

Career information
- High school: Beloit Memorial
- College: Trinidad (1953–1954); Colorado (1955–1956)
- NFL draft: 1956: 5th round, 61st overall pick

Career history
- Cleveland Browns (1957–1959); Dallas Cowboys (1960–1967)

Awards and highlights
- First-team All-Pro (1964); NFL receiving touchdowns leader (1962)

Career NFL statistics
- Receptions: 291
- Receiving yards: 5,426
- Receiving touchdowns: 50
- Stats at Pro Football Reference

Franklin Clarke (February 7, 1934 – July 25, 2018) was an American professional football wide receiver in the National Football League (NFL) for the Cleveland Browns and Dallas Cowboys. He played college football at the University of Colorado.

== Early life ==
Clarke was born on February 7, 1934, in Beloit, Wisconsin. Clarke was named after Franklin D. Roosevelt, the 32nd President of the United States. He attended Beloit Memorial High School where he played football and basketball, and was on the track team. He received All-State honors in football (Associated Press (AP) second-team end in 1951) and track. He clocked 49.9 seconds in the 440-yard dash. In 1952, he won the 440-yard race and was a member of the winning 880-yard Beloit relay team in the Wisconsin state-wide track competition.

== College football ==
After attending Trinidad State Junior College for two years, where he had a successful career, he became the first African-American varsity football player at the University of Colorado at Boulder, joining the Buffaloes in September 1954. Colorado coach Dallas Ward made the decision to bring black players to the team. Clarke had to sit out the season after transferring. He was joined the following year by John Wooten, an All-American who would play 10 years in the NFL. Because this was before the civil rights movement, the pair often had to endure open racism outside of Boulder.

As a junior, he was an honorable-mention All-Big 7 Conference performer, when he was second in the league with 407 receiving yards, during a run-oriented era. He also returned kickoffs, while leading the team with 13 receptions (averaging 31.3 yards per catch) and 5 receiving touchdowns (of his career total seven touchdowns).

As a senior, he led the team with seven receptions for 124 yards and two receiving touchdowns. Trailing 14–0 against the University of Missouri and needing a tie or a win to clinch a berth for the 1957 Orange Bowl, Clarke scored two second half touchdowns. The game ended in a 14–14 tie. Colorado won their next two games (21–7 over Utah and 38–7 over Arizona), and earned the right to play Clemson University in the Orange Bowl.

Clemson originally stated that they would not play in the bowl against a team with black athletes, but later changed its position in the face of the entire Colorado team and its coaches refusing to play without Clarke and Wooten. When the team arrived in Miami, Clarke and Wooten refused to allow themselves to be discriminated against at the team's hotel. Colorado defeated Clemson in the Orange Bowl, 27–21. The Clemson players themselves expressed no racial animus during the game.

Clarke amassed 20 receptions for 532 yards (26.6 yard average), 7 receiving touchdowns and 2 blocked kicks, ending his career fifth at the time in receiving yards at Colorado. Clarke was selected to play in the Copper Bowl All-Star game after his senior year. He was so well liked among his peers on campus, that he was chosen as King of the annual Days Festival, Colorado's equivalent of Homecoming King. He also played basketball and was on the track team.

In 2008, he was inducted into the Colorado Athletic Hall of Fame.

== Professional career ==
=== Cleveland Browns ===
Clarke was selected by the Cleveland Browns in the fifth round (61st overall) of the 1956 NFL draft. He played with the team for three seasons, from 1957 to 1959, even though he stood on the sidelines during the first two. He did not start any games his rookie year, and had only four receptions. He started one game each of the next two years, with three receptions in each of those years; accumulating a total of just 10 catches during those three years at offensive right end. He was left unprotected in the 1960 NFL expansion draft.

=== Dallas Cowboys ===
Clarke was selected by the Dallas Cowboys in the 1960 NFL Expansion Draft. His coaches at Colorado and Cleveland criticized his blocking, but the Cowboys were still intrigued by the 6 ft 1 in (1.85 m), 215-pound (98 kg) player. Instead of picking at his deficiencies, Tom Landry chose to accentuate his strengths. The coach appreciated his speed, soft hands and his ability to run precise routes, so he was converted into a split end. Mostly a backup behind Billy Howton and Fred Dugan, he appeared in 8 games (3 starts), registering 9 receptions, 290 yards, 3 touchdowns and a 32.2-yard average.

He moved into the starting role in 1961, tallying 41 receptions, 919 yards, 22.4-yard average (led the league), 9 touchdowns and scored 54 points (led the team). Additionally, he began a streak of seven consecutive games with at least a touchdown reception, which still stands as a Cowboys record shared with Bob Hayes (1965–1966), Terrell Owens (2007), and Dez Bryant (2012).

He turned out to be the Cowboys' first bona fide long-ball threat—before "Bullet" Bob Hayes joined him. Hayes even credits Clarke for teaching him the proper way to catch "the bomb"—the long pass. He is also credited as the first African American star athlete, on a Cowboys team that played in a then racially divided Dallas.

In 1962, his opening day performance against the Washington Redskins was one for the ages. His 10 receptions for 241 yards, remains the best opening day performance in terms of most yards receiving, of any wide receiver in the history of the NFL. It was the team record for receiving yards in a game until broken by Bob Hayes in 1966, and is still third best (as of 2025).

On September 23, 1962, Clarke was part of an infamous play where, for the first time in an NFL game, points were awarded for a penalty. The Cowboys were holding in the end zone on a 99-yard touchdown pass from Eddie LeBaron to Clarke, and the Pittsburgh Steelers were awarded a safety, helping them win the game 30–28. He was close to breaking the NFL season touchdown receiving record until missing the last 2 games with an injury, only playing in 12 games rather than the full 14. That year would be his best (though he was selected All-Pro for the only time two years later), becoming the first player in team history to gain more than 1,000 yards in a season (ground or air) and recording 47 passes for career high numbers in yards (1043) and touchdowns (14). In addition, he led the NFL with 14 touchdowns and a 22.2-yard average per reception.

In 1964, he caught a career-high 65 passes (then a franchise record, now tied for 52nd) 973 yards, 5 touchdowns and received first-team All-Pro honors from the Associated Press, and second-team honors from the Newspaper Enterprise Association and United Press International. From 1961-64, Clarke led all NFL receivers in total touchdown receptions.

In 1965, he was moved to tight end and started all 14 games, in place of 1964 tight end starter Pettis Norman. Clarke was second on the team behind Bob Hayes with 41 receptions for 682 yards and 4 touchdowns. In 1966, however, Norman was moved back to starting tight end and Clarke was the backup tight end. Clarke remained productive and became a clutch third down receiver, recording 26 receptions for 355 and 4 touchdowns (while Norman caught only 12 passes for 144 yards). The next year, his production fell to 9 receptions for 119 yards. He announced his retirement on July 17, 1968.

Clarke led the Cowboys in yards and touchdowns from 1961 to 1964, and catches in 1963 and 1964. He held the franchise record for most touchdowns in a season by a receiver with 14 from his 1962 season, which stood for 45 years until 2007, when it was broken by Terrell Owens. Clarke set his record in 12 games, while Owens played in 15. Dez Bryant exceeded both in 2014, in 16 games. He has the third most multi-touchdown games in team history (9), behind Bob Hayes (15) and Dez Bryant (10). It has also been stated he had the team record for the most career receiving multi-touchdown games with 9, until it was broken by Dez Bryant in 2014. In his career, Hayes had scored two rushing touchdowns and three touchdowns on punt returns, to go along with his 71 receiving touchdowns.

He retired after the 1967 NFL Championship Game against the Green Bay Packers, in what is now known as the “Ice Bowl”, won by the Packers, 21–17. During the game, wind chill temperatures reached as low as -48 degrees. One of the Packers players, Boyd Dowler, had been Clarke's quarterback at Colorado. Dowler caught two touchdown passes that day, while Clarke had two receptions, and one rushing attempt for negative yardage.

He left with most of the franchise's records for receiving, finishing with 281 receptions for 5,214 yards and 51 touchdowns in 140 NFL games, which ranks eighth in receiving yards in Dallas Cowboys history (as of 2025).

Clarke was the last member of the original Dallas Cowboys team to retire.

== NFL career statistics ==
Legend
	Led the league
**Bold**	Career high

=== Regular season ===
Year	Team	Games		Receiving				
Year	Team	GP	GS	Rec	Yds	Avg	Lng	TD
1957	CLE	12	0	4	77	19.3	43	0
1958	CLE	12	1	3	91	30.3	34	0
1959	CLE	12	1	3	44	14.7	20	0
1960	DAL	8	3	9	290	**32.2**	76	3
1961	DAL	**14**	**14**	41	919	22.4	**80**	9
1962	DAL	12	12	47	**1,043**	22.2	66	**14**
1963	DAL	**14**	**14**	43	833	19.4	75	10
1964	DAL	**14**	**14**	**65**	973	15.0	49	5
1965	DAL	**14**	**14**	41	682	16.6	53	4
1966	DAL	**14**	0	26	355	13.7	33	4
1967	DAL	**14**	0	9	119	13.2	23	1
Career		140	73	291	5,426	18.6	80	50

== Broadcasting ==
Clarke began his career as a sportscaster for WFAA-TV (Channel 8). He became the first African American sports anchor in a Dallas television station and at CBS. On weekends, he anchored sports reports for WFAA-TV when not working NFL games for CBS.

== Personal life ==
May 29, 1967, was declared Frank Clarke Day in Beloit.

He was Catholic, raised in the faith and passing it down to his children. He was involved in health care in North Carolina after retiring.

His nephew is former sheriff David Clarke of Milwaukee.

== Death ==
Clarke died on July 25, 2018, at the age of 84.
