= Mike Gaechter =

American football player (1940–2015)

No. 27
- Positions: Safety, Cornerback

Personal information
- Born: January 9, 1940; Santa Monica, California, U.S.
- Died: August 17, 2015 (aged 75); Dallas, Texas, U.S.
- Listed height: 6 ft 0 in (1.83 m)
- Listed weight: 190 lb (86 kg)

Career information
- High school: Antelope Valley (Lancaster, California)
- College: Oregon
- NFL draft: 1962: undrafted

Career history
- Dallas Cowboys (1962–1969); Washington Redskins (1971)*
- * Offseason or practice squad member only

Career NFL statistics
- Interceptions: 21
- Fumble recoveries: 4
- Total touchdowns: 2
- Stats at Pro Football Reference

Michael Theodore Gaechter (January 9, 1940 – August 17, 2015) was an American professional football player who was a safety in the National Football League (NFL) for the Dallas Cowboys. He played college football for the Oregon Ducks.

== Early life ==
Born in Santa Monica, California, Gaechter graduated from Antelope Valley High School in Lancaster, where he was a standout in track and played as a halfback in football.

Gaechter enrolled at the University of Oregon. Because of grades he transferred to Clark College in Vancouver, Washington, where he competed in the long jump, the 100, 200, low and high hurdles, and the relay team.

In 1961, he earned his reacceptance to the University of Oregon. That year during a track meet at the University of Washington in Seattle, he recorded his fastest time with 9.4 seconds in the 100-yard dash at Husky Stadium. In 1962, Gaechter with teammates Mel Renfro, Jerry Tarr, and Harry Jerome, ran the third leg on the University of Oregon's world record setting team, in the 4×110 yard relay. The team also won the NCAA championship.

Gaechter's main college sport was track and field, becoming a first-time starter in football until his senior year at halfback. He also played linebacker and was voted the team's most improved player.

== Professional career ==
=== Dallas Cowboys ===
Gaechter was signed by the Dallas Cowboys in 1962 as an undrafted free agent and became the starting left cornerback as a rookie because of injuries. He registered 5 interceptions. In that season, the Cowboys became the first NFL team in history to produce two 100-yard plays in the same game: a 100-yard interception return for a touchdown by Gaechter and a 101-yard kickoff return for a touchdown by running back Amos Marsh. His interception return was a franchise record that was broken by Bryan McCann 48 years later in 2010.

In 1963, although he had a track background, he was a punishing hitter so he was switched to strong safety. Against the Washington Redskins, he set a franchise record with 121 return interceptions yards (2 interceptions) in a single-game.

In 1964, he started the first 4 games until fracturing his elbow. In 1965, he was mostly a reserve player, starting 5 games. On November 28, he returned an attempted field goal 60 yards for a touchdown against the Washington Redskins.

In 1966, he regained his starter position. He earned the reputation as a feared defensive player in the Cowboys secondary. His late hit in the end zone that upended the Packers' Boyd Dowler after a touchdown reception in the third quarter of the 1966 NFL Championship Game, caused Dowler a shoulder injury and allowed the seldom-used Max McGee to star in Super Bowl I two weeks later.

Gaechter had been a mainstay on the Cowboys defense for most of the 1960s, until rupturing his Achilles tendon at the end of the 1969 season, in the third place Playoff Bowl loss to the Los Angeles Rams in January 1970. He never fully recovered, finishing with 8 seasons and 21 interceptions (13th in club history) during his time in Dallas. He also has two of the five longest interception returns in team history (100 yards and 86 yards in 1963 against the Washington Redskins).

In 1970, Cornell Green moved from cornerback to strong safety to replace Gaechter who was placed on the injured reserve list. After sitting out the entire season, he was traded in 1971 to the Washington Redskins for a conditional draft choice (not exercised) on July 20.

=== Washington Redskins ===
In 1971, after only a few weeks of training camp under new head coach George Allen, Gaechter was released by the Redskins on August 11.

== Personal life ==
Gaechter overcame being allergic to grass. In 1972 and 1982, he filed lawsuits against the Dallas Cowboys organization for medical malpractice. After suffering from Alzheimer's disease, Gaechter died of heart failure at age 75 on August 17, 2015.

His wife Cheri donated his brain for research at University of Texas Southwestern Medical Center in Dallas, which launched the Texas Institute for Brain Injury and Repair in 2014 and has established ties to the NFL. After his funeral mass at St. Ann's parish in Coppell, Geachter was buried at Restland Memorial Park in Dallas.
