= Joe Isbell =

American football player (born 1940)

Joe Bob Isbell
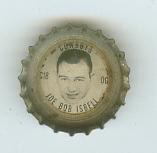
- Isbell on a Coca-Cola bottle cap from 1966

No. 60, 61
- Position: Guard

Personal information
- Born: July 7, 1940 (age 86); Gorman, Texas, U.S.
- Listed height: 6 ft 1 in (1.85 m)
- Listed weight: 243 lb (110 kg)

Career information
- High school: Little Cypress (TX)
- College: Houston
- AFL draft: 1962: 20th round, 159 (By the Houston Oilers)th overall pick

Career history
- Dallas Cowboys (1962–1965); Cleveland Browns (1966); Houston Oilers (1967)*; Cincinnati Bengals (1968)*
- * Offseason or practice squad member only

Career statistics
- Games played: 45
- Stats at Pro Football Reference

Joe Bob Isbell (born July 7, 1940) is an American former professional football player who was an offensive guard in the National Football League (NFL) for the Dallas Cowboys and Cleveland Browns. He played college football for the Houston Cougars.

== Early life ==
Isbell attended Little Cypress High School, before moving on to the University of Houston, where he was a team co-captain as a senior.

== Professional career ==
=== Dallas Cowboys ===
Isbell was selected by the Houston Oilers in the twentieth round (159th overall) of the 1962 AFL draft, but instead chose to sign with the NFL's Dallas Cowboys as a free agent in 1962. On September 11, he was placed on the injured reserve list, but returned in October to play in 9 games.

On November 3, 1963, he suffered a left knee injury against the Washington Redskins and was lost for the year.

Isbell was mostly a backup player until 1964, when he started 10 games at right guard. The next year, he was placed on the taxi squad because of injuries and wasn't activated during the season.

On August 15, 1966, he was traded to the Cleveland Browns in exchange for a fifth round draft choice (#127-Zeke Moore).

=== Cleveland Browns ===
In 1966, he was a reserve player with the Cleveland Browns. He was waived on September 5, 1967.

=== Houston Oilers ===
In 1967, he was signed as a free agent by the Houston Oilers to their taxi squad.

=== Cincinnati Bengals ===
Isbell was selected by the Cincinnati Bengals in the 1968 AFL expansion draft from the Houston Oilers roster. He was released on July 13.
