= Guy Reese =

American football player (1939–2010)

No. 68, 75, 76
- Position: Defensive tackle

Personal information
- Born: September 22, 1939; Dallas, Texas, U.S.
- Died: November 22, 2010 (aged 71); Collin County, Texas, U.S.
- Listed height: 6 ft 5 in (1.96 m)
- Listed weight: 258 lb (117 kg)

Career information
- High school: Dallas (TX) South Oak Cliff
- College: SMU
- NFL draft: 1962: 15th round, 200th overall pick
- AFL draft: 1962: 11th round, 83rd overall pick

Career history
- Dallas Cowboys (1962–1963); Baltimore Colts (1964–1965); Atlanta Falcons (1966)

Awards and highlights
- NFL All-Rookie team (1962)

Career NFL statistics
- Fumble recoveries: 1
- Sacks: 9
- Stats at Pro Football Reference

Guy Price Reese (September 22, 1939 – November 22, 2010) was an American professional football defensive tackle in the National Football League (NFL) for the Dallas Cowboys, Baltimore Colts and Atlanta Falcons. He played college football at Southern Methodist University.

== Early life ==
Reese attended South Oak Cliff High School, where he played as a two-way tackle. He accepted a football scholarship from Southern Methodist University. He became a starter at right tackle as a junior.

== Professional career ==
=== Dallas Cowboys ===
Reese was selected by the Dallas Cowboys in the fifteenth round (200th overall) of the 1962 NFL draft and by the Dallas Texans in the eleventh round (83rd overall) of the 1962 AFL draft.

He opted to sign with the Cowboys and was tried at the offensive line. As a rookie, he was named the starter at left defensive tackle opposite John Meyers. He was part of a defensive line called the "Maverick Line", that had 3 rookies and a second-year player. He was named to the NFL All-Rookie team.

In 1963, he was the starter opposite future hall of famer Bob Lilly. On July 12, 1964, he was traded to the Baltimore Colts in exchange for defensive tackle Jim Colvin.

=== Baltimore Colts ===
In 1964, although he was limited with an ankle injury early in the season, he passed Billy Ray Smith Sr. on the depth chart. He started 12 out of 14 games at right defensive tackle, while playing alongside Fred Miller.

In 1964, he was mainly a backup behind Smith Sr., starting 3 out of 13 games.

=== Atlanta Falcons ===
The Atlanta Falcons selected him from the Colts roster in the 1966 NFL expansion draft. He was named the starter at left defensive tackle in the franchise's inaugural season, but suffered a knee injury in the second game against the Philadelphia Eagles and was lost for the year. It turned out to be a career-ending injury that forced him to retire on May 17, 1967.

== Personal life ==
Reese was a real estate appraiser for over 30 years. He died of cancer on November 22, 2010.
