= Donnie Davis (gridiron football end) =

American gridiron football player (1940–2004)

No. 89, 70, 84, 88
- Positions: Wide receiver, Tight end

Personal information
- Born: September 18, 1940; Opelousas, Louisiana, U.S.
- Died: January 19, 2004 (aged 63); Houston, Texas, U.S.
- Listed height: 6 ft 3 in (1.91 m)
- Listed weight: 225 lb (102 kg)

Career information
- High school: Wheatley (Houston, Texas)
- College: Southern
- NFL draft: 1962: 6th round, 74th overall pick

Career history
- Dallas Cowboys (1962); Grand Rapids Blazers (1964); Green Bay Packers (1965)*; Montreal Alouettes (1965–1968); Houston Oilers (1970); Houston Texans / Shreveport Steamer (1974-1975)
- * Offseason or practice squad member only

Career NFL statistics
- Receptions: 2
- Receiving yards: 31
- Return yards: 66
- Stats at Pro Football Reference

Donnie Ray Davis (September 18, 1940 – January 19, 2004) was an American professional football wide receiver in the National Football League (NFL) for the Dallas Cowboys and Houston Oilers. He also was a member of the Montreal Alouettes in the Canadian Football League (CFL). He played college football at Southern University.

== Early life ==
Davis attended Wheatley High School, where he practiced track and field, playing organized football only as a senior.

He accepted a track and field scholarship from Southern University to run hurdles. He also played four years on the football team as a wingback.

== Professional career ==
=== Dallas Cowboys ===
Davis was selected by the Dallas Cowboys in the sixth round (74th overall) of the 1962 NFL draft. He appeared in 11 games as a backup wide receiver. He was waived in 1963.

=== Grand Rapids Blazers (UFL) ===
In 1964, he played with the Grand Rapids Blazers of the United Football League.

=== Green Bay Packers ===
In 1965, he was signed by the Green Bay Packers. He was tried at defensive back and was released on August 29.

=== Montreal Alouettes ===
On September 8, 1965, he signed with the Montreal Alouettes of the Canadian Football League. In 1967, he was the team's leading receiver with 31 catches for 656 yards and a 21.2-yard per catch average. On August 25, 1969, he was cut with a broken wrist.

=== Houston Oilers ===
In 1970, he was signed as a free agent by the Houston Oilers. He appeared in 14 games as a backup tight end. He was released on September 9, 1971.

=== Houston Texans / Shreveport Steamer ===
In 1974, he signed with the Houston Texans of the World Football League. The team relocated to Shreveport on September 18, and were rechristened the Shreveport Steamer. He finished the season with 18 receptions for 280 yards. Davis returned the next year, posting 9 receptions for 144 yards and one touchdown. He finished his career when the league folded on October 22, 1975.

== Personal life ==
On January 19, 2004, he died after a lengthy battle with cancer.
