= Lynn Hoyem =

American football player (1939–1973)

No. 51, 63
- Positions: Guard, center, tackle

Personal information
- Born: June 27, 1939; Fargo, North Dakota, U.S.
- Died: February 17, 1973 (aged 33); Battle Ground, Washington, U.S.
- Listed height: 6 ft 4 in (1.93 m)
- Listed weight: 253 lb (115 kg)

Career information
- High school: Redondo Beach (CA) Union
- College: Long Beach State
- NFL draft: 1961: 19th round, 254th overall pick
- AFL draft: 1962: 29th round, 226th overall pick

Career history
- Dallas Cowboys (1962–1963); Philadelphia Eagles (1964–1967)

Awards and highlights
- Second-team All-CCAA (1961)

Career NFL statistics
- Games played: 84
- Games started: 20
- Fumble recoveries: 1
- Stats at Pro Football Reference

Lynn Douglas Hoyem (June 27, 1939 – February 17, 1973) was an American professional football offensive lineman in the National Football League (NFL) for the Dallas Cowboys and Philadelphia Eagles. He was drafted in the 19th round of the 1961 NFL draft and in the 29th round of the 1962 AFL draft. He played college football at Long Beach State University.

== Early life ==
Hoyem attended Redondo Union High School, where he played as a quarterback. He accepted a football scholarship from Long Beach State University. He was switched to center and became a three-year starter. He also played at linebacker.

In 1987, he was inducted into the Long Beach State University Athletic Hall of Fame. The athletics department created the Lynn Hoyem Leadership Award in his honor.

== Professional career ==
=== Dallas Cowboys ===
Hoyem was selected by the Dallas Cowboys in the 19th round (254th overall) of the 1961 NFL draft with a future draft pick, which allowed the team to draft him before his college eligibility was over; becoming the first player from his school to be drafted into the NFL. He was also selected by the Denver Broncos in the 29th round (226th overall) of the 1962 AFL draft.

On November 25, 1961, he signed with the Cowboys. He was a backup center and guard, that played mainly on special teams. In 1963, he started six games at left guard.

On March 20, 1964, he was traded to the Philadelphia Eagles along with Sam Baker and defensive tackle John Meyers, in exchange for wide receiver Tommy McDonald.

=== Philadelphia Eagles ===
In 1964, he started eight games at right guard after passing Pete Case on the depth chart. Hoyem played for four seasons with the Philadelphia Eagles mostly in a reserve role on the offensive line. He announced his retirement on July 24, 1968.

== Personal life ==
After his football career, he became a pilot for Northwest Airlines. On February 17, 1973, he died in a private plane crash.
