= Doug Mooers =

American football player (born 1947)

No. 74
- Position: Defensive end

Personal information
- Born: March 11, 1947 (age 79); Seattle, Washington, U.S.
- Listed height: 6 ft 6 in (1.98 m)
- Listed weight: 265 lb (120 kg)

Career information
- High school: Western
- College: Whittier
- NFL draft: 1970: undrafted

Career history
- Dallas Cowboys (1970)*; New Orleans Saints (1971–1972)
- * Offseason or practice squad member only
- Stats at Pro Football Reference

Douglas F. Mooers (born March 11, 1947) is an American former professional football player who was a defensive end for the New Orleans Saints of National Football League (NFL). He played college football for the Whittier Poets.
