= Sam Baker (kicker) =

American football player (1930–2007)

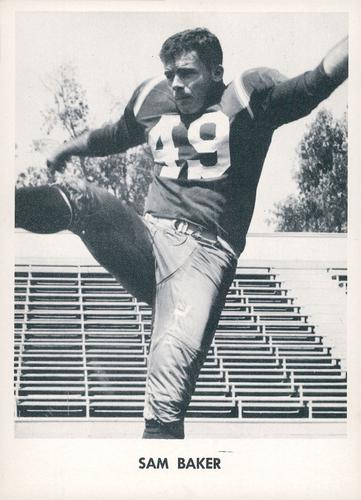
- Baker in 1958

No. 45, 49, 38
- Positions: Placekicker, punter, fullback

Personal information
- Born: November 12, 1930; San Francisco, California, U.S.
- Died: June 5, 2007 (aged 76); Tacoma, Washington, U.S.
- Listed height: 6 ft 1 in (1.85 m)
- Listed weight: 205 lb (93 kg)

Career information
- High school: Corvallis (Corvallis, Oregon)
- College: Oregon State
- NFL draft: 1952: 11th round, 133rd overall pick

Career history
- Washington Redskins (1953, 1956–1959); Cleveland Browns (1960–1961); Dallas Cowboys (1962–1963); Philadelphia Eagles (1964–1969)

Awards and highlights
- First-team All-Pro (1966); 4× Pro Bowl (1956, 1963-1964, 1968); NFL scoring leader (1957); First-team All-PCC (1952); 2× Second-team All-PCC (1950, 1951)

Career NFL statistics
- Field goals made: 179
- Field goal attempts: 316
- Field goal %: 56.6%
- Punts: 703
- Punting yards: 29,938
- Stats at Pro Football Reference

Loris Hoskins "Sam" Baker (November 12, 1930 – June 5, 2007) was an American professional football player in the National Football League (NFL) for the Washington Redskins, Cleveland Browns, Dallas Cowboys and Philadelphia Eagles. While he played several positions, he was best known for being a punter and Placekicker. He played college football at Oregon State College, where he was a star fullback.

Baker led the NFL in scoring in 1957, was a first team All-Pro in 1966, and was selected four times to participate in the league's postseason Pro Bowl All-Star game.

== Early life ==
Baker was born on November 12, 1930, in San Francsico. (It has also been stated he was born on November 12, 1929.) He was raised in Tacoma, Washington and then moved to Corvallis, Oregon as a high school senior when his father accepted a job with Oregon State University (then known as Oregon State College).

Baker attended Stadium High School in Tacoma before transferring after his junior year to Corvallis High School, where he graduated in 1949. In high school, he excelled in baseball and basketball, as well as football. He was an all-around standout in track at Corvallis, but at the time there was not a state decathlon championship, so he only participated in individual events such as shot put, javelin, discus, high jump and broad jump.

He helped his team win the 1948 Oregon state championship in basketball and also lettered in baseball. He has the distinction of receiving All-State honors in both Washington and Oregon.

== College career ==
Baker accepted a football scholarship from Oregon State College, located in his home town of Corvallis, Oregon. He spent the 1949 season on the rookie team. He lettered for the varsity team from 1950 to 1952 as a running back/kicker/safety.

As a sophomore, he rushed for 668 yards (fourth in the conference). As a junior, he rushed for 830 yards (second in the conference). In his career at OSU, Baker rushed for 1,947 on 487 carries and was the school record-holder in both categories when he left, and gained 2,043 yards. He was voted most valuable player by teammates for three straight years (1950-52). He was selected All-Pacific Coast Conference first-team in 1952 by the Associated Press.

In 1952, Baker participated in the East-West Shrine Game in San Francisco, setting a record for the longest punt (72 yards).

When compared to OSU players since 1956, he ranks 14th in career rushing yards, and 9th in career rushing attempts (as of 2025). He had five 100-yard games, with a best of 159 on 30 carries in the 1951 Civil War Game at Hayward Field, between OSU and the University of Oregon; scoring two touchdowns in the fourth quarter to pull out a 14–7 victory for OSU. In the 1950 Civil War game, Baker had a 59-yard touchdown run on a fake punt, and ran for over 100 yards. He scored the final touchdown at old Bell Field in the final 1952 home game.

== Professional career ==
=== Los Angeles Rams ===
Baker was selected by the Los Angeles Rams in the eleventh round (133rd overall) of the 1952 NFL draft with a future draft pick, which allowed the team to draft him before his college eligibility was over. On July 6, 1953, his draft rights were sold to the Washington Redskins.

=== Washington Redskins ===
In 1953, he played sparingly in his first season with the Washington Redskins, under coach Curly Lambeau, before spending two years out of professional football, while serving his military service at Fort Ord. He scored a 58-yard touchdown on a fake punt for Fort Ord in the 1955 Shrimp Bowl.

In 1956, although he was initially being considered for the right halfback position, he was asked to become the team's kicker after Vic Janowicz suffered a serious brain injury in an automobile accident that ended his athletic career. That same year he also became the punter after Eddie LeBaron was sidelined with an injury. He was given the nickname "Sugarfoot", after leading the NFL in field goals (17), starting an 11-year streak of averaging at least 40 yards per punt attempt and being named to the Pro Bowl.

In 1957, he tied with Lou Groza with a league-high 77 points (including an 11-yard or 20-yard touchdown run off of a fake kick against the Pittsburgh Steelers on December 15, to go along with 14 field goals and 29 extra points made on the year).

In 1958, his 45.4-yard punting average was the best in the league, while he still managed to convert 25 extra points in 25 attempts. On April 25, 1960, he was traded to the Cleveland Browns in exchange for Fran O'Brien and Robert Khayat.

=== Cleveland Browns ===
In 1960, he relinquished his fullback duties with the Cleveland Browns and would replace the retired Groza, who left after the 1959 season because of a back injury. He led the NFL in extra points made (44) and extra points attempted (46). He posted a 42-yard punting average.

In 1961, Groza returned to the team after his back felt better and Baker focused only on punting. He was the league's eighth ranked punter with an average of 43.3-yards per punt. On December 30, he was traded to the Dallas Cowboys in exchange for cornerback Tom Franckhauser.

=== Dallas Cowboys ===
In 1962, he set the team record of 45.4 yards-per-punt that was not broken until 2006 by Mat McBriar with a 48.2-yard average. He also set club records for most points scored in a season (92), longest field goal (53 yards) and longest punt (72 yards). He was the NFL leader in extra points made (50), extra points attempted (51), ranked third in punting average (45.4) and sixth in scoring (92).

In 1963, he became the first Cowboys punter to make the Pro Bowl, after registering a 44.2-yard average. His 40.6-yard net average per punt still ranks third in team history.

Baker played two seasons as a punter and kicker for the Dallas Cowboys, until his disregard for the team rules and discipline wore thin with head coach Tom Landry. In both years he led the league in net punting average. He also became the first player in club history to have two seasons with a 44-yard or better gross punting average.

On March, 20, 1964, he was traded to the Philadelphia Eagles along with John Meyers and Lynn Hoyem, in exchange for wide receiver Tommy McDonald.

=== Philadelphia Eagles ===
Baker remained with the Philadelphia Eagles for the last six seasons of his career. He played in the 1964 and 1968 Pro Bowls. He was waived on September 2, 1970, just ahead of the coming season. As of the 2025 season, he is fourth on the all-time Eagles scoring list.

=== Career ===
Upon retiring he was the number two scorer in NFL history (977 points) and held the record of scoring in 110 straight games. As of 2025, he is 73rd on the all-time NFL scoring list. He played for 15 seasons, with more than 700 punts and making 179 field goals.

== Honors ==
In 1977, Baker was inducted into the State of Washington Sports Hall of Fame. In 1980, Baker was inducted into the State of Oregon Sports Hall of Fame. In 1991, he was inducted into the Oregon State University Sports Hall of Fame.

== Personal life ==
Baker met his wife Sarah at Corvalis High School, and both attended OSU. They had four daughters. After Baker retired from football, the family moved to Fircrest, Washington.

== Death ==
Baker died due to complications from diabetes on June 5, 2007. He was 76 years old at the time of his death.
