= John Meyers (American football) =

American football player (1940–1998)

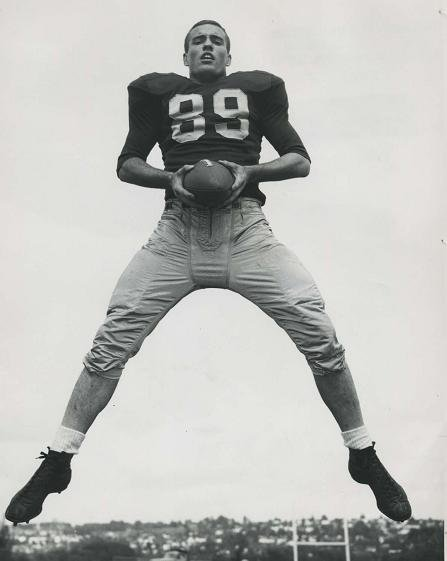

No. 78, 75
- Position: Defensive tackle

Personal information
- Born: January 16, 1940; Forest City, Iowa, U.S.
- Died: May 7, 1998 (aged 58); Los Angeles, California, U.S.
- Listed height: 6 ft 6 in (1.98 m)
- Listed weight: 276 lb (125 kg)

Career information
- High school: Columbia (WS)
- College: Washington (1958–1961)
- NFL draft: 1962: 3rd round, 31st overall pick
- AFL draft: 1962: 4th round, 25th overall pick

Career history
- Los Angeles Rams (1962)*; Dallas Cowboys (1962–1963); Philadelphia Eagles (1964–1967)
- * Offseason or practice squad member only

Awards and highlights
- First-team All-PCC (1961)

Career NFL statistics
- Fumble recoveries: 4
- Interceptions: 2
- Sacks: 13
- Stats at Pro Football Reference

John Douglas Meyers (January 16, 1940 – May 7, 1998) was an American professional football player who was a defensive tackle in the National Football League (NFL) for the Dallas Cowboys and Philadelphia Eagles. He played college football at the University of Washington.

== Early life ==
Affectionately known as "Big John", he attended Columbia High School. In 1957, he was an All-state football player and was an All-American in basketball and led his team to the 1958 State Basketball Championship.

Meyers accepted a basketball scholarship from the University of Washington and was soon recruited by Jim Owens to play football as well. He was a two-time Rose Bowl champion. After starting two years at end, he was moved to tackle as a senior.

He was the starting right tackle for the Huskies in the 49–6 Rose Bowl victory over the Wisconsin Badgers. The next day, he played on the basketball team against the UCLA Bruins. The athletics department created the John Meyers Defensive Player award in his honor for the basketball teams. He also lettered in baseball.

He was a captain of the 1960 Washington Huskies football team, which won a national championship.

== Professional career ==
=== Los Angeles Rams ===
Meyers was selected by the Los Angeles Rams in the third round (31st overall) of the 1962 NFL draft and also was selected in the fourth round (25th overall) of the 1962 AFL draft by the Oakland Raiders.

On September 7, he was traded to the Dallas Cowboys along with linebacker Bob Long, in exchange for a third round draft choice (#32-Willie Brown).

=== Dallas Cowboys ===
In 1962, he was named the starter at right defensive tackle opposite Guy Reese. He was part of a defensive line called the "Maverick Line", that had 3 rookies and a second-year player.

Seven games into the 1963 season, the team switched Bob Lilly from left defensive end to right defensive tackle, relegating him to the bench. On March 20, 1964, he was traded to the Philadelphia Eagles along with Sam Baker and offensive lineman Lynn Hoyem, in exchange for wide receiver Tommy McDonald.

=== Philadelphia Eagles ===
Meyers was a starter at right defensive tackle in his first two seasons with the Philadelphia Eagles. He was released on August 15, 1968.

== Personal life ==
Meyers married Joanne Rohrbaugh on July 5, 1962. They had two children Kristy and Nicole. On May 7, 1998, he died at the UCLA Medical Center as he was waiting for a heart transplant.
