= Dave Edwards (linebacker) =

American football player (1939–2016)

No. 52,53
- Position: Linebacker

Personal information
- Born: December 14, 1939; Columbia, Alabama, U.S.
- Died: December 6, 2016 (aged 76); Laguna Park, Texas, U.S.
- Listed height: 6 ft 1 in (1.85 m)
- Listed weight: 225 lb (102 kg)

Career information
- High school: Abbeville (AL)
- College: Auburn
- AFL draft: 1962: 25th round, 194th overall pick

Career history
- Dallas Cowboys (1962–1975)

Awards and highlights
- Super Bowl champion (VI); First-team All-SEC (1961)

Career statistics
- Games played: 181
- Games started: 163
- Interceptions: 13
- Interception yards: 66
- Fumble recoveries: 17
- Stats at Pro Football Reference

David Monroe Edwards (December 14, 1939 – December 6, 2016) was an American football linebacker in the National Football League (NFL) for the Dallas Cowboys. He played college football at Auburn University.

== Early life ==
Edwards was born on December 14, 1939, in Abbeville, Alabama, to Warren and Millie Edwards. Edwards attended Abbeville High School. He began playing varsity football in 9th grade. He was a two-way tackle and contributed to the team having a 9–1 record, while outscoring their opponents 281–19 in 1957. He received All-state honors as a senior. He also played forward on the school's basketball team.

== College career ==
He accepted a football scholarship from Auburn University, and was on the team from 1959 to 1961, playing in the Southeastern Conference (SEC). He was a two-way player who was used as an offensive end and defensive end. As a junior, he posted 6 receptions (tied for second on the team with future NFL player Jimmy Burson) for 74 yards and no touchdowns.

As a senior, he led the team with 25 receptions for 372 yards and 3 touchdowns. He was named to the All-SEC team. He played for the South team in the 1962 Senior Bowl, where his future NFL coach Tom Landry coached the opposing team (North). He also played in the Blue Gray Game.

== Professional career ==
Edwards was not drafted by any NFL team, and was selected by the Denver Broncos in the 25th round (194th overall) of the 1962 AFL draft; but chose to sign with the NFL's Dallas Cowboys as a free agent in December 1961. Cowboys Hall of Fame personnel director Gil Brandt called it probably the best ever Cowboys' free agent signing. In 1962, Edwards started out as an offensive end on the taxi squad and was later converted to outside linebacker. He was not activated to play for the Cowboys in any of the 14 games that season.

Before the 1962 season started, Edwards and teammates George Andrie and Mike Gaechter had thrown bottles into a swimming pool while partying at a hotel. When future Hall of Fame head coach Tom Landry learned of it he was so angry he wanted to throw them off the team. Future Hall of Fame tackle Bob Lilly and some other Cowboys players convinced Landry to instead fine them and put them on probation. Edwards went on to play his entire NFL career at linebacker with the Cowboys (1963 to 1975), all under head coach Landry. Landry had been the New York Giants' defensive coordinator from 1954–59, where he was credited with creating the 4–3 defense.

In 1963, Edwards gained 25 lbs (11.3 kg), going from 205 lb (92.9) to 230 lb (104.3), and started 6 games at right linebacker, while replacing the injured Lee Roy Jordan and injured fellow rookie Harold Hays. In 1963, Chuck Howley was the Cowboys starting left linebacker and Jerry Tubbs the starting middle linebacker.

In 1964, it was anticipated that Howley would start at left linebacker, but Howley was injured before the start of the season. Edwards began the season as the starter at strongside linebacker (left linebacker), with Jordan at right linebacker and Tubbs in the middle. Edwards started the season's first four games at left linebacker. Howley became the starting left linebacker in the fifth game that season, and was the starting left linebacker through the 13th game of the season. Overall, Edwards started five games in 1964 (starting the final game of the season at right linebacker for Jordan), with one interception and one fumble recovery. Howley started eight games at left linebacker, missing the last game of the season.

From 1965 through the 1968 season, Edwards was the starter at right linebacker, with Howley starting at left linebacker. In 1969, Edwards and Howley switched sides, with Edwards becoming the strong side linebacker and Howley on the weak side to take advantage of Howley's ability in man-to-man pass coverage. Because of his physical strength, Edwards was also able to play effectively against the tight ends he lined up against. Edwards, Howley and Jordan (who played full time middle linebacker from 1966 to 1976) formed one of the best linebacking corps in NFL history as part of the 'Doomsday Defense'.

From 1965 to 1975, Edwards started every regular season Cowboys game, but one. In 1967, he had career-highs with three interceptions and 5.5 quarterback sacks; while tying a career-high with three fumble recoveries. He returned one interception for a touchdown against the Baltimore Colts' Johnny Unitas.

In 1970, Edwards was injured and did not start in the Cowboys' December 5 game against Washington. This is the only regular season Cowboys' game he did not start from 1965 to 1975. The following week, Edwards intercepted two passes in a December 12 game against the Cleveland Browns, in the first and fourth quarters. The game was played in muddy conditions that kept the score low. Edwards' second interception sealed a 6–2 win. Howley also had two key defensive plays in the Cleveland game, and the Associated Press named Howley and Edwards co-winners as NFL Defensive Player of the Week. That victory was key for the team's winning the National Football Conference's East Division and making the playoffs, ultimately leading to Dallas' first Super Bowl appearance (Super Bowl V), against the Baltimore Colts. Edwards started and had three tackles in the Super Bowl, a 16–13 loss.

In 1971, the Cowboys again won the NFC East, with an 11–3 record. Edwards had two interceptions and two fumble recoveries during the regular season. They went on to defeat the Miami Dolphins, 24–3 in Super Bowl VI. Edwards had two tackles in the game. The Cowboys were in the NFC championship game the following season, losing to the Washington, 26–3. In the 1973 season, they again reached the NFC championship game, losing to the Minnesota Vikings, 27–10. Edwards had two fumble recoveries and .5 sacks that season. The following season, the Cowboys missed the playoffs, but they reached the Super Bowl again in the 1975 season, losing Super Bowl X to the Pittsburgh Steelers, 21–17. Edwards had three tackles, in what was the last game of his NFL career.

On July 1, 1976, he announced his retirement and was replaced with Bob Breunig. Although overshadowed by Howley and Jordan, he was a key component in the Cowboys' defensive dominance during the late 1960s and early 1970s. Cowboys defensive assistant coach Ernie Stautner said "The best thing you can say about Edwards is that he's a pro. He plays while he's hurt and he still does an outstanding job. That's what a pro is".

== Legacy and honors ==
Edwards missed only one game in his 13 NFL seasons playing with the Cowboys, while playing in 181 regular season games, starting 164 of those games. He recorded 30 turnovers, that included 13 interceptions and 17 fumbles recoveries (tied for second in franchise history). He also played in 18 playoff games. He helped the Cowboys win three NFC Championships and one Super Bowl. He played in Super Bowls V, VI and X. Super Bowl X was his last game.

Referred to as "Fuzzy" by his teammates, Edwards' physical strength made him a difficult player to deal with against the run and he was also known to rarely make mistakes that could hurt the defense. He thrived against opposing tight ends, so much so, that then Oakland Raiders linebackers coach John Madden, instructed his linebackers to study Edwards' technique in stopping the run while jamming the tight end. He was considered a much better run defender than pass defender.

Despite being a starting linebacker, Edwards continued to play on special teams. Former teammate D. D. Lewis described Edwards as being "all in" when playing football. Lewis also said of Edwards that "A lot of coaches used Dave's play on the edge to teach their linebackers how to play it". Teammate Walt Garrison observed that Edwards excelled as a strong-side linebacker, because "he had the strongest hands. Those tight ends never got away from him. ... He was one of a kind – tough athlete, funny guy and generous. He was a great linebacker, but he was a better guy".

His hometown of Abbeville held a Dave Edwards Day in January 1962. The local chamber of commerce introduced the Dave Edwards Trophy, to be engraved each year with the name of Abbeville High School's most valuable football player. In 1988, he was inducted into the Alabama Sports Hall of Fame. In 1993, Edwards was inducted into the Wiregrass Hall of Fame.

== Personal life and death ==
Edwards was a talented painter whose work was displayed in several shows. Former teammate Jordan called painting Edwards's passion. On December 6, 2016, Edwards died in his sleep the day he was scheduled to undergo tests for a heart condition at a Waco, Texas hospital. Edwards' son, Chris, planned on burying both of his parents' ashes together. However, his house was robbed on March 20, 2017, and his mother Gail's ashes were taken by the burglar.
