= Pettis Norman =

American football player (1939–2025)

No. 84, 88
- Position: Tight end

Personal information
- Born: January 4, 1939; Lincolnton, Georgia, U.S.
- Died: July 7, 2025 (aged 86); Dallas, Texas, U.S.
- Listed height: 6 ft 3 in (1.91 m)
- Listed weight: 222 lb (101 kg)

Career information
- High school: West Charlotte (Charlotte, North Carolina)
- College: Johnson C. Smith
- AFL draft: 1962: 16th round, 123rd overall pick

Career history
- Dallas Cowboys (1962–1970); San Diego Chargers (1971–1973)

Awards and highlights
- 2× All-CIAA (1960, 1961)

Career statistics
- Games: 162
- Receptions: 183
- Receiving yards: 2,492
- Receiving touchdowns: 15
- Stats at Pro Football Reference

Pettis Burch Norman (January 4, 1939 – July 7, 2025) was an American professional football player who was a tight end in the National Football League (NFL) for the Dallas Cowboys and the San Diego Chargers. He played college football for the Johnson C. Smith Golden Bulls.

== Early life ==
Norman was born in Lincolnton, Georgia, on January 4, 1939, to Fessor and Elease "Eloise" Norman (née Booker) as the youngest of ten children. He was ten years old when his father died, and his family moved to Charlotte, North Carolina. He attended Biddlesville Elementary School, Northwest Junior High, and West Charlotte High School, where he made the team in his junior season and became a standout starter in his final year. He enlisted in the Air Force but was granted a release before attending boot camp due to a football scholarship offer from Johnson C. Smith University, a historically Black university, by then coach Eddie McGirt, without ever having seen him play.

He was named the starter and team MVP at split end as a freshman. He was a two-way player and became a two-time All-CIAA selection. As a senior he had a game with 5 receptions for 133 yards, 2 touchdowns and was credited with 14 tackles. Norman also lettered in track and field, once posting a 9.7 seconds 100-yard dash.

== Professional career ==
=== Dallas Cowboys ===
Norman was selected by the Dallas Texans in the 16th round (123rd overall) of the 1962 AFL draft, but wasn't chosen in the NFL draft due to the Texans spreading rumors that they had already signed him to a contract. This situation influenced him to join the Dallas Cowboys in 1962 as an undrafted free agent. He was used mostly on special teams during his first two seasons and wore #84 throughout his Dallas Cowboys career.

In 1963, he was initially used as a split end and started 6 games, before being moved to tight end because he excelled in blocking. The next year, he became a full-time starter and manned the Cowboys tight end position for nearly a decade. In 1965 and 1966, Norman split the tight end job with Franklin Clarke.

He played in the 1967 NFL Championship Game, often referred to as the "Ice Bowl." against the Green Bay Packers at Lambeau Field in sub-zero temperatures. The Dallas Cowboys lost 21–17 in the last minutes of the game, due in large part to Bart Starr's quarterback sneak play.

When Mike Ditka joined the Cowboys in 1969 after having been a 4 time All-Pro tight end with the Chicago Bears, Norman remained the starter, but split playing time with Ditka to provide great blocking and leadership along the offensive line.

Norman also started in Super Bowl V, which was a loss to the Baltimore Colts. The sports announcer Jack Buck during his two-year stint covering the Cowboys, famously referred to him on the air as Norman Pettis, prompting Blackie Sherrod, a sportswriter in Dallas, to write: "Dallas fans are tired of Pettis Norman constantly being referred to as Norman Pettis by broadcaster Buck Jack."

After trading Lance Rentzel, the Cowboys replaced Norman with future hall of famer Lance Alworth and Norman was sent to the San Diego Chargers as part of the "Bambi trade" in May 1971, that also involved Ron East and Tony Liscio.

=== San Diego Chargers ===
In his first season with the San Diego Chargers, Norman was named the starter at tight end and had a career-high 27 catches for 358 yards. He played with the Chargers until he retired after the 1973 season because of a degenerative knee condition, having played 12 years and 162 games, receiving 183 passes for 2,492 yards and 15 touchdowns.

== Personal life and death ==
Norman enlisted in the Texas Army National Guard in 1962 and served until 1968 while playing for the Dallas Cowboys. He married his junior high sweetheart, Margaret Ann Clinkscales, on December 22, 1962, and had three daughters before becoming widowed in 1991. The Reverend Jesse Jackson eulogized Norman's late wife. In 1995, Norman married Ivette Hightower, daughter of the late Master Chief Harry Hightower for whom Hightower Hall at Naval Station Norfolk was named. The Reverend Jesse Jackson officiated the wedding.

Norman was active in changing the segregationist climate within the Cowboys and later the City of Dallas, helping to organize marches during the civil rights movement, influencing the changing of the team's roommate assignments and breaking social barriers. He and several Dallas Cowboy teammates marched for civil rights with the Jesuits in 1965 in downtown Dallas. Norman protested again in 1971 when council member George Allen was passed over as Mayor Pro Tem of Dallas despite reassurances to the contrary.

After his retirement from the NFL, Norman became a successful businessman in different ventures (fast food franchises, apartment complexes, real estate development, fuel transportation, convenience stores, etc.).

In 1975, Norman became a television announcer and color commentator for the World Football League, formed in 1973 by attorney and businessman Gary Davidson. He broadcast on WRET-36 (Charlotte, NC), WGHP TV-8 (High Point, NC), and WTCG-17 (Atlanta, GA) with John Sterling.

He founded the Dallas Together Forum in the 1990s, an initiative that worked with Dallas CEOs to improve minority hiring and award contracts to women-owned and minority-owned businesses.

He was a member emeritus of JCSU's board of trustees, had served as a keynote speaker, advisor, board member, and volunteer for numerous organizations, and was involved in charity golf tournaments benefiting various causes and nonprofits.

Norman sued the Dallas Cowboys and San Diego Chargers, claiming medical negligence in the handling of his injured knee.

On December 2, 2014, the Dallas Police Department reported that Sharneen Norman, who also went by "Shawn," died from a gunshot wound. She was the eldest of Norman's three daughters. The person of interest, believed to be her boyfriend, later committed suicide.

Norman died on July 7, 2025, at the age of 86.

== Awards and recognition ==
Norman was featured on the History Channel's History Stories regarding his recollection of the assassination of President Kennedy on November 22, 1963, in Dallas, Texas, and the Dallas Cowboys' subsequent loss to the Cleveland Browns two days later.

He was recognized in the Congressional Record by the Honorable James M. Collins (October 13, 1972) as a Dallas Park Board member, by the Honorable Martin Frost (September 30, 1985, and February 3, 1988) during Minority Enterprise Development Week and regarding police-community relations, and by the Honorable Eddie Bernice Johnson (May 18, 2010, and January 8, 2019) for his contributions to the City of Dallas.

In 1977, he was inducted into the Central Intercollegiate Athletic Association Hall of Fame.

In 2010, he was inducted into the Black Sports Hall of Fame.

In 2017, he was honored as a Dallas/Fort Worth Black Living Legend.

In 2017, he was included on the Mecklenburg Sports Wall of Fame in Mecklenburg County, North Carolina.

In 2024, he was inducted into the North Carolina Sports Hall of Fame in Raleigh, North Carolina.

Johnson C. Smith University's most prestigious sports award, the Pettis Norman Male and Female Athlete of the Year Award, is given annually to the school's most outstanding student-athletes.

Norman was known for his television and documentary appearances on The NFL on CBS, The NFL on NBC, NBC Sports, NFL Monday Night Football, and NFL Films. He appeared in numerous media including The New York Times, Texas Monthly, The Dallas Morning News, NBC DWF 5, the Dallas Business Journal, The Cowboys Legends Show, The Charlotte Post, The Charlotte Observer, and many others.
