= 1967 Pittsburgh Steelers season =

NFL team season

- Owner: Art Rooney
- Head coach: Bill Austin
- Home stadium: Pitt Stadium

Results
- Record: 4–9–1
- Division place: 4th NFL Century
- Playoffs: Did not qualify

The 1967 Pittsburgh Steelers season was the team's 35th in the National Football League. They finished 4–9–1, for last place in the new NFL Century Division.

The last remaining active member of the 1967 Pittsburgh Steelers was Sam Davis, who retired after the 1979 season, right after winning Super Bowl XIV, also as a member of the Steelers.

Bill Nunn became a part-time scout for the team this year.

== Offseason ==
=== NFL draft ===
1967 Pittsburgh Steelers draft
Round	Pick	Player	Position	College	Notes
2	35	Don Shy	Running back	San Diego State	
3	73	Rocky Freitas *	Offensive tackle	Oregon State	
4	89	Ray May	Linebacker	USC	
6	140	Mike Haggerty	Offensive tackle	Miami (FL)	
8	192	John Foruria	Quarterback	Idaho	
Made roster * Made at least one Pro Bowl during career

=== Undrafted free agents ===
1967 undrafted free agents of note
Player	Position	College
Tony Loukas	Guard	Wisconsin
Bob Tubbs	Linebacker	Northwestern
George Wilmot	Linebacker	SMU

== Roster ==
1967 Pittsburgh Steelers roster
Quarterbacks (QB): 11 Rich Badar; 14 Bill Nelsen; 10 Kent Nix; Running backs (RB): 30 Willie Asbury; 23 Jim Butler; 38 Earl Gros; 42 Dick Hoak; 25 Don Shy; Wide receivers (WR): 45 Dick Compton; 89 Marshall Cropper; 85 Jerry Marion; 87 Roy Jefferson; 86 J. R. Wilburn; Tight ends (TE): 46 Chet Anderson; 82 John Hilton	Offensive linemen (OL): 74 John Brown T; 57 Sam Davis G; 79 Larry Gagner G; 76 Mike Haggerty T; 56 Ray Mansfield C; 66 Bruce Van Dyke G; 62 Ralph Wenzel G; Defensive linemen (DL): 71 Dick Arndt DT; 78 John Baker DE; 64 Chuck Hinton DT; 75 Ken Kortas DT; 61 Jerry Mazzanti DE; 60 Ben McGee DE; 65 Lloyd Voss DE	Linebackers (LB): 63 Rod Breedlove OLB; 53 John Campbell OLB; 59 Ray May MLB; 34 Andy Russell OLB; 50 Bill Saul MLB; Defensive backs (DB): 24 Jim Bradshaw SS; 9 John Foruria FS; 29 Bob Hohn CB; 20 Paul Martha FS; 37 Bobby Morgan CB/S; 28 Clendon Thomas SS; 47 Marv Woodson CB; Special teams (ST): 83 Mike Clark K; 6 Jim Elliott P	Reserve: 49 Amos Bullocks RB (IR); -- Riley Gunnels DT (NF-Ill.); 68 Mike Magac G (IR); 72 Fran O'Brien T (IR); Rookies in italics

== Regular season ==
=== Schedule ===
Week	Date	Opponent	Result	Record	Venue
1	September 17	Chicago Bears	**W** 41–13	1–0	Pitt Stadium
2	September 24	**St. Louis Cardinals**	**L** 14–28	1–1	Pitt Stadium
3	October 1	at Philadelphia Eagles	**L** 24–34	1–2	Franklin Field
4	October 7	at **Cleveland Browns**	**L** 10–21	1–3	Cleveland Municipal Stadium
5	October 15	**New York Giants**	**L** 24–27	1–4	Pitt Stadium
6	October 22	Dallas Cowboys	**L** 21–24	1–5	Pitt Stadium
7	October 29	at New Orleans Saints	**W** 14–10	2–5	Tulane Stadium
8	November 5	**Cleveland Browns**	**L** 14–34	2–6	Pitt Stadium
9	November 12	at **St. Louis Cardinals**	**T** 14–14	2–6–1	Busch Memorial Stadium
10	November 19	at **New York Giants**	**L** 20–28	2–7–1	Yankee Stadium
11	November 26	Minnesota Vikings	**L** 27–41	2–8–1	Pitt Stadium
12	December 3	at Detroit Lions	**W** 24–14	3–8–1	Tiger Stadium
13	December 10	Washington Redskins	**L** 10–15	3–9–1	Pitt Stadium
14	December 17	at Green Bay Packers	**W** 24–17	4–9–1	Lambeau Field
Note: Intra-division opponents are in **bold** text.

=== Game summaries ===
==== Week 1 (Sunday September 17, 1967): Chicago Bears ====
	1	2	3	4	Total
Bears	13	0	0	0	**13**
**Steelers**	10	7	17	7	**41**

at Pitt Stadium, Pittsburgh, Pennsylvania

- **Game time: 3:45 p.m. EDT**
- **Game weather: Snow**
- **Game attendance: 53,565**
- Referee:
- TV announcers:

Scoring Drives:

- Pittsburgh – FG Clark 41 3–0
- Chicago – Sayers 103 kickoff return (kick blocked) 3–6
- Chicago – R. Taylor 37 fumble return (Percival kick)3–13
- Pittsburgh – Hilton 43 pass from Nelsen (Clark kick)10–13
- Pittsburgh – Asbury 1 run (Clark kick)17–13
- Pittsburgh – Bivins 2 run (Clark kick)24–13
- Pittsburgh – FG Clark 39 27–13
- Pittsburgh – Asbury 1 run (Clark kick)34–13
- Pittsburgh – Compton 6 pass form Nelsen (Clark kick)41–13

==== Week 2 (Sunday September 24, 1967): St. Louis Cardinals ====
	1	2	3	4	Total
**Cardinals**	13	6	0	9	**28**
Steelers	0	7	7	0	**14**

at Pitt Stadium, Pittsburgh, Pennsylvania

- **Game time: 5:15 p.m. EDT**
- **Game weather: Fair**
- **Game attendance: 45,579**
- Referee:
- TV announcers:

Scoring Drives:

- St. Louis – FG Bakken 18 0–3
- St. Louis – FG Bakken 24 0–6
- St. Louis – Hart 23 run (Bakken kick)0–13
- St. Louis – FG Bakken 33 0–16
- Pittsburgh – Anderson 5 pass from Nelsen (Clark kick) 7–16
- St. Louis – FG Bakken 29 7–19
- Pittsburgh – Asbury 1 run (Clark kick)14–19
- St. Louis – FG Bakken 24 14–22
- St. Louis – FG Bakken 32 14–25
- St. Louis – FG Bakken 23 14–28

Jim Bakken sets then NFL record with 7 field goals.

==== Week 3 (Sunday October 1, 1967): Philadelphia Eagles ====
	1	2	3	4	Total
Steelers	7	7	3	7	**24**
**Eagles**	7	17	0	10	**34**

at Franklin Field, Philadelphia, Pennsylvania

- **Game time: 3:00 p.m. EDT**
- **Game weather: Windy**
- **Game attendance: 60,335**
- Referee: Bud Brubaker
- TV announcers:

Scoring Drives:

- Pittsburgh – Asbury 25 run (Clark kick)7–0
- Philadelphia – Lang 5 pass from Snead (Baker kick)7–7
- Philadelphia – FG Baker 36 7–10
- Philadelphia – Hawkins 29 pass from Snead (Baker kick)7–17
- Pittsburgh – Hoak 4 run (Clark kick)14–17
- Philadelphia – Kelly 4 pass from Snead (Baker kick)14–24
- Pittsburgh – FG Clark 24 17–24
- Pittsburgh – Wilburn 18 pass from Nix (Clark kick)24–24
- Philadelphia – Hawkins 8 pass from Snead (Baker kick)24–31
- Philadelphia – FG Baker 35 24–34

==== Week 4 (Saturday October 7, 1967): Cleveland Browns ====
	1	2	3	4	Total
Steelers	3	0	7	0	**10**
**Browns**	0	7	14	0	**21**

at Cleveland Municipal Stadium, Cleveland, Ohio

- **Game time: 3:00 p.m. EDT**
- **Game weather: Fair**
- **Game attendance: 82,949**
- Referee: Pat Haggerty
- TV announcers:

Scoring Drives:

- Pittsburgh – FG Clark 43 3–0
- Cleveland – Warfield 17 pass from Ryan (Groza kick)3–7
- Cleveland – Smith 49 pass from Ryan (Groza kick)3–14
- Pittsburgh – Hoak 8 pass from Nix (Clark kick)10–14
- Cleveland – E. Green 15 pass from Ryan (Groza kick)10–21

==== Week 5 (Sunday October 15, 1967): New York Giants ====
	1	2	3	4	Total
**Giants**	7	7	0	13	**27**
Steelers	7	10	7	0	**24**

at Pitt Stadium, Pittsburgh, Pennsylvania

- **Game time: 4:30 p.m. EDT**
- **Game weather: Rain**
- **Game attendance: 39,782**
- Referee:
- TV announcers:

Scoring Drives:

- New York – Morrison 19 pass from Tarkenton (Mercein kick)0–7
- Pittsburgh – Nix 1 run (Clark kick)7–7
- New York Giants – Morrall 1 run (Mercein kick)7–14
- Pittsburgh – Shy 27 pass from Nix (Clark kick)14–14
- Pittsburgh – FG Clark 22 17–14
- Pittsburgh – Hilton 8 pass from Nix (Clark kick)24–14
- New York Giants – Tarkenton 7 run (kick failed)24–20
- New York Giants – Morrison 59 pass from Tarkenton (Harris kick)24–27

==== Week 6 (Sunday October 22, 1967): Dallas Cowboys ====
	1	2	3	4	Total
**Cowboys**	7	7	0	10	**24**
Steelers	0	7	0	14	**21**

at Pitt Stadium, Pittsburgh, Pennsylvania

- **Game time: 3:15 p.m. EDT**
- **Game weather: Calm**
- **Game attendance: 39,641**
- Referee:
- TV announcers:

Scoring Drives:

- Dallas – Hayes 55 pass from Morton (Villanueva kick)0–7
- Dallas – Hayes – 35 pass from Morton (Villanueva kick)0–14
- Pittsburgh – Hilton 5 pass from Nix (Clark kick)7–14
- Pittsburgh – Nix 1 run (Clark kick)14–14
- Dallas – FG Villanueva 34 14–17
- Pittsburgh – Wilburn 11 pass from Nix (Clark kick)21–17
- Dallas – Norman 5 pass from Morton (Villanueva kick)21–24

==== Week 7 (Sunday October 29, 1967): New Orleans Saints ====
	1	2	3	4	Total
**Steelers**	0	0	0	14	**14**
Saints	3	7	0	0	**10**

at Tulane Stadium, New Orleans, Louisiana

- **Game time: 3:00 p.m. EDT**
- **Game weather: Fair**
- **Game attendance: 68,912**
- Referee:
- TV announcers:

Scoring Drives:

- New Orleans – FG Durkee 37 0–3
- New Orleans – Taylor 2 run (Durkee kick)0–10
- Pittsburgh – Wilburn 5 pass from Nelsen (Clark kick)7–10
- Pittsburgh – Shy 33 run (Clark kick)14–10

==== Week 8 (Sunday November 5, 1967): Cleveland Browns ====
	1	2	3	4	Total
**Browns**	14	10	7	3	**34**
Steelers	0	7	0	7	**14**

at Pitt Stadium, Pittsburgh, Pennsylvania

- **Game time: 7:15 p.m. EDT**
- **Game weather: Fair**
- **Game attendance: 47,131**
- Referee: Tommy Bell
- TV announcers:

Scoring Drives:

- Cleveland – Collins 3 pass from Ryan (Groza kick)0–7
- Cleveland – Kelly 41 pass from Ryan (Groza kick)0–14
- Cleveland – Davis 52 punt return (Groza kick)0–21
- Pittsburgh – Jefferson 18 pass from Nelsen (Clark kick)7–21
- Cleveland – FG Groza 37 7–24
- Cleveland – E. Green 27 run (Groza kick)7–31
- Cleveland – FG Groza 35 7–34
- Pittsburgh – Wilburn 13 pass from Nelsen (Clark kick)14–34

==== Week 9 (Sunday November 12, 1967): St. Louis Cardinals ====
	1	2	3	4	Total
Steelers	0	7	0	7	**14**
Cardinals	0	7	0	7	**14**

at Busch Memorial Stadium, St. Louis, Missouri

- **Game time: 3:45 p.m. EDT**
- **Game weather: Fair**
- **Game attendance: 47,994**
- Referee:
- TV announcers:

Scoring Drives:

- Pittsburgh – Shy 4 run (Clark kick)7–0
- St. Louis – Roland 2 run (Bakken kick)7–7
- St. Louis – Smith 6 pass from Hart (Bakken kick)7–14
- Pittsburgh – Jefferson 6 pass from Nelsen (Clark kick)14–14

==== Week 10 (Sunday November 19, 1967): New York Giants ====
	1	2	3	4	Total
Steelers	6	7	0	7	**20**
**Giants**	0	14	14	0	**28**

at Yankee Stadium, The Bronx, New York

- **Game time: 12:15 p.m. EDT**
- **Game weather: Snow**
- **Game attendance: 62,892**
- Referee:
- TV announcers:

Scoring Drives:

- Pittsburgh – FG Clark 44 0–3
- Pittsburgh – FG Clark 10 0–6
- New York Giants – Thomas 35 pass from Tarkenton (Gogolak kick)6–7
- New York Giants – Minniear 6 pass from Tarkenton (Gogolak kick)6–14
- Pittsburgh – Jefferson 58 pass from Nelsen (Clark kick)13–14
- New York Giants – Koy 1 run (Gogolak kick)13–21
- New York Giants – Minniear 1 run (Gogolak kick)13–28
- Pittsburgh – Hilton 10 pass from Nelsen (Clark kick)20–28

==== Week 11 (Sunday November 26, 1967): Minnesota Vikings ====
	1	2	3	4	Total
**Vikings**	3	14	0	24	**41**
Steelers	7	6	7	7	**27**

at Pitt Stadium, Pittsburgh, Pennsylvania

- **Game time: 3:15 p.m. EDT**
- **Game weather: Windy**
- **Game attendance: 32,773**
- Referee:
- TV announcers:

Scoring Drives:

- Minnesota – FG Cox 44 0–3
- Pittsburgh – Anderson 20 pass from Hoak (Clark kick)7–3
- Pittsburgh – FG Clark 47 10–3
- PIttsburgh – FG Clark 26 13–3
- Minnesota – Osborn 27 pass from Kapp (Cox kick) 13–10
- Minnesota – Beasley 2 pass from Kapp (Cox kick)13–17
- Pittsburgh – Jefferson 12 pass from Nelsen (Clark kick)20–17
- Minnesota – Hargrove blocked punt recovery (Cox kick)20–24
- Minnesota – Mackbee 32 interception return (Cox kick)20–31
- Minnesota – Kapp 11 run (Cox kick)20–38
- Minnesota – FG Cox 34 20–41
- Pittsburgh – Kortas 5 fumble return (Clark kick)27–41

==== Week 12 (Sunday December 3, 1967): Detroit Lions ====
	1	2	3	4	Total
**Steelers**	7	14	0	3	**24**
Lions	0	0	7	7	**14**

at Tiger Stadium, Detroit, Michigan

- **Game time: 6:45 p.m. EDT**
- **Game weather: Snow**
- **Game attendance: 47,713**
- Referee:
- TV announcers:

Scoring Drives:

- Pittsburgh – Shy 1 run (Clark kick)7–0
- Pittsburgh – Shy 1 run (Clark kick)14–0
- Pittsburgh – Wilburn 66 pass from Nix (Clark kick)21–0
- Detroit – Farr 3 pass from Plum (Walker kick)21–7
- Pittsburgh – FG Clark 17 24–7
- Detroit – Nowatzke 3 run (Yepremian kick)24–14

==== Week 13 (Sunday December 10, 1967): Washington Redskins ====
	1	2	3	4	Total
**Redskins**	0	9	0	6	**15**
Steelers	0	3	0	7	**10**

at Pitt Stadium, Pittsburgh, Pennsylvania

- **Game time: 12:00 p.m. EDT**
- **Game weather: Fair**
- **Game attendance: 22,251**
- Referee:
- TV announcers:

Scoring Drives:

- Washington – Whitfield 2 run (Alford kick)0–7
- Washington – Safety, Breding blocked punt in end zone 0–9
- Pittsburgh – FG Clark 20 3–9
- Pittsburgh – Hilton 3 pass from Nix (Clark kick)10–9
- Washington – Taylor 33 pass from Jurgensen (kick blocked)10–15

==== Week 14 (Sunday December 17, 1967): Green Bay Packers ====
	1	2	3	4	Total
**Steelers**	7	7	10	0	**24**
Packers	0	10	0	7	**17**

at Lambeau Field, Green Bay, Wisconsin

- **Game time: 2:05 P.M. EDT**
- **Game weather: Snow**
- **Game attendance: 50,861**
- Referee:
- TV announcers:

Scoring Drives:

- Pittsburgh – McGee 21 interception return (Clark kick)7–0
- Green Bay – FG Chandler 25 7–3
- Pittsburgh – Gros 22 run (Clark kick)14–3
- Green Bay – Williams 29 pass from Horn (Chandler kick)14–10
- Pittsburgh – FG Clark 27 17–10
- Pittsburgh – Hinton 27 fumble return (Clark kick)24–10
- Green Bay – Williams 25 run (Chandler kick)24–17

=== Standings ===
NFL Century
	W	L	T	PCT	DIV	CONF	PF	PA	STK
Cleveland Browns	9	5	0	.643	5–1	7–3	334	297	L1
New York Giants	7	7	0	.500	5–1	7–3	369	379	W1
St. Louis Cardinals	6	7	1	.462	1–4–1	4–5–1	333	356	L2
Pittsburgh Steelers	4	9	1	.308	0–5–1	1–8–1	281	320	W1

Note: Tie games were not officially counted in the standings until 1972.
