= 1968 Pittsburgh Steelers season =

36th franchise season

- Owner: Art Rooney
- Head coach: Bill Austin
- Home stadium: Pitt Stadium

Results
- Record: 2–11–1
- Division place: 4th NFL Century
- Playoffs: Did not qualify
- All-Pros: Roy Jefferson (2nd team)
- Pro Bowlers: 3: WR Roy Jefferson; DE Ben McGee; LB Andy Russell

The 1968 Pittsburgh Steelers season was the team's 36th in the National Football League.

1968 continued the team's descent in the NFL's basement, finishing with a third league-worst 2–11–1 record (Eagles and Falcons both 2–12) and the dismissal of head coach Bill Austin at the end of the season, leading to the eventual hiring of Chuck Noll. To this date, Austin is the last head coach to be fired by the Steelers.

The season is notable in that the Steelers had their last tied game before the NFL adopted the overtime rule in regular-season games in 1974 in Week 9 against the St. Louis Cardinals in a 28–28 stalemate; that game actually was the deciding game in the NFL Century Division that season, as the Cardinals had swept the Cleveland Browns but finished the season 9–4–1, 1/2 game behind the 10–4 Browns. Since that game, the Steelers have only had two tied games, both happening after the overtime rule took effect.

In addition, the Steelers lost to the Baltimore Colts at home, 41–7, in Week 3, as the Colts went on to play in Super Bowl III, in which they were upset by the AFL's New York Jets. After that loss, the Steelers would go another 40 years before losing to the Colts at home again, winning 12 straight (including three postseason meetings, among them the now-famous 1995 AFC Championship game as well as the 1975 Divisional Playoff Game that saw the introduction of the Terrible Towel) before losing to the now-Indianapolis Colts, 24–20, on November 10, 2008.

== Offseason ==
No major player transactions happened in the offseason, although the team would draft Notre Dame running back Rocky Bleier with their last pick (16th round) in the 1968 draft. Bleier's drafting by the team was mainly at the insistence of Steelers owner Art Rooney, who thought Bleier was Catholic for attending Notre Dame, even though Bleier was actually Presbyterian. Bleier would play ten games for the Steelers before being drafted again—this time by the military to fight in Vietnam. Despite being wounded the following summer, Bleier would go on to be a major contributor to the Steelers' success in the 1970s.

The most notable offseason change happened with the team's uniforms. After just two seasons, the team ditched the so-called "Batman"-themed uniforms and adopted a modified version of their pre-1966 black design for both jerseys. The team brought back the Northwestern-style stripes on the sleeves, but put a white stripe in between each gold stripe on the black jerseys and black trim on each of the stripes on the white jerseys. The team also adopted white numbers on the home jerseys (the lone carryover from the "Batman" jerseys), while the team retained the gold pants from the "Batman" uniforms as well as the team's helmet, which was adopted in 1963. Save for wearing white pants with the white jerseys in 1970 and '71, as well as changing the font of the jersey numbers in 1997, these uniforms remain in use as of 2022.

=== NFL draft ===
1968 Pittsburgh Steelers draft
Round	Pick	Player	Position	College	Notes
1	10	Mike Taylor	Offensive tackle	USC	
2	36	Ernie Ruple	Defensive end	Arkansas	
3	61	Jon Henderson	Defensive back	Colorado State	
7	174	Doug Dalton	Running back	New Mexico State	
8	201	Danny Holman	Quarterback	San Jose State	
Made roster * Made at least one Pro Bowl during career

=== Undrafted free agents ===
1968 undrafted free agents of note
Player	Position	College
Jay Calabrese	Fullback	Duke

== Roster ==
1968 Pittsburgh Steelers roster
Quarterbacks (QB): 10 Kent Nix; 17 Dick Shiner; Running backs (RB): 30 Willie Asbury; 38 Earl Gros; 42 Dick Hoak; 25 Don Shy; Wide receivers (WR): 45 Dick Compton; 89 Marshall Cropper; 16 Ken Hebert; 24 Jon Henderson; 87 Roy Jefferson; 86 J. R. Wilburn; Tight ends (TE): 82 John Hilton; 84 Tony Jeter; 88 Rich Kotite	Offensive linemen (OL): 74 John Brown T; 52 Mike Connelly C; 57 Sam Davis G; 79 Larry Gagner G; 56 Ray Mansfield C; 72 Fran O'Brien T; 77 Mike Taylor T; 66 Bruce Van Dyke G; Defensive linemen (DL): 71 Dick Arndt DT; 64 Chuck Hinton DT; 75 Ken Kortas DT; 60 Ben McGee DE; 78 Frank Parker DT; 73 Ernie Ruple DE; 65 Lloyd Voss DE	Linebackers (LB): 67 Dick Capp OLB; 67 Jerry Hillebrand OLB; 59 Ray May MLB; 34 Andy Russell OLB; 50 Bill Saul MLB; Defensive backs (DB): 9 John Foruria FS; 49 Lou Harris SS; 20 Paul Martha FS; 28 Clendon Thomas SS/FS; 44 Bob Wade CB; 47 Marv Woodson CB/SS; Special teams (ST): 35 Booth Lusteg K; 39 Bobby Walden P	Reserve: 26 Rocky Bleier RB (Military); 53 John Campbell LB (IR); 76 Mike Haggerty T (IR); 29 Bob Hohn CB (IR); 62 Ralph Wenzel G (IR); Rookies in italics

== Regular season ==
=== Schedule ===
Week	Date	Opponent	Result	Record	Venue
1	September 15	New York Giants	**L** 20–34	0–1	Pitt Stadium
2	September 22	at Los Angeles Rams	**L** 10–45	0–2	Los Angeles Memorial Coliseum
3	September 29	Baltimore Colts	**L** 7–41	0–3	Pitt Stadium
4	October 5	at **Cleveland Browns**	**L** 24–31	0–4	Cleveland Municipal Stadium
5	October 13	at Washington Redskins	**L** 13–16	0–5	D.C. Stadium
6	October 20	**New Orleans Saints**	**L** 12–16	0–6	Pitt Stadium
7	October 27	Philadelphia Eagles	**W** 6–3	1–6	Pitt Stadium
8	November 3	at Atlanta Falcons	**W** 41–21	2–6	Atlanta Stadium
9	November 10	at **St. Louis Cardinals**	**T** 28–28	2–6–1	Busch Memorial Stadium
10	November 17	**Cleveland Browns**	**L** 24–45	2–7–1	Pitt Stadium
11	November 24	San Francisco 49ers	**L** 28–45	2–8–1	Pitt Stadium
12	December 1	**St. Louis Cardinals**	**L** 10–20	2–9–1	Pitt Stadium
13	December 8	at Dallas Cowboys	**L** 7–28	2–10–1	Cotton Bowl
14	December 15	at **New Orleans Saints**	**L** 14–24	2–11–1	Tulane Stadium
Note: Intra-division opponents are in **bold** text.

=== Game summaries ===
==== Week 1 (Sunday September 15, 1968): New York Giants ====
	1	2	3	4	Total
**Giants**	7	21	0	6	**34**
Steelers	13	7	0	0	**20**

at Pitt Stadium, Pittsburgh, Pennsylvania

- Game time:
- Game weather:
- Game attendance: 45,698
- Referee: Bernie Ulman
- TV announcers:

Scoring Drives:

- Pittsburgh – Hoak 6 run (kick failed)6–0
- New York Giants – Morrison 10 pass from Tarkenton (Gogolak kick)7–6
- Pittsburgh – Gros 5 pass from Nix (Shockley kick)13–7
- New York Giants – Morrison 13 pass from Tarkenton (Gogolak kick)13–14
- New York Giants – Minniear 1 run (Gogolak kick)13–21
- New York Giants – Tarkenton 4 run (Gogolak kick)13–28
- Pittsburgh – Compton 9 pass from Nix (Shockley kick)20–28
- New York Giants – FG Gogolak 23 20–31
- New York Giants – FG Gogolak 17 20–34

==== Week 2 (Sunday September 22, 1968): Los Angeles Rams ====
	1	2	3	4	Total
Steelers	3	7	0	0	**10**
**Rams**	7	24	7	7	**45**

at Los Angeles Memorial Coliseum, Los Angeles

- Game time:
- Game weather:
- Game attendance: 49,647
- Referee: George Rennix
- TV announcers:

Scoring Drives:

- Los Angeles – Casey 5 pass from Gabriel (Gossett kick)0–7
- Pittsburgh – FG Lusteg 20 3–7
- Los Angeles – FG Gossett 12 3–10
- Pittsburgh – Gros 1 run (Lusteg kick)10–10
- Los Angeles – Casey 55 pass from Gabriel (Gossett kick)10–17
- Los Angeles – Bass 28 pass from Gabriel (Gossett kick)10–24
- Los Angeles – Bass 10 run (Gossett kick)10–31
- Los Angeles – Bass 1 pass from Gabriel (Gossett kick)10–38
- Los Angeles – Ellison 4 pass from Plum (Gossett kick)10–45

==== Week 3 (Sunday September 29, 1968): Baltimore Colts ====
	1	2	3	4	Total
**Colts**	3	21	3	14	**41**
Steelers	0	0	0	7	**7**

at Pitt Stadium, Pittsburgh, Pennsylvania

- Game time:
- Game weather:
- Game attendance: 44,480
- Referee: Jim Tunney
- TV announcers:

Scoring Drives:

- Baltimore – FG Michaels 38 0–3
- Baltimore – Mitchell 4 pass from Morrall (Michaels kick)0–10
- Baltimore – Brown 2 run (Michaels kick)0–17
- Baltimore – Boyd 25 interception return (Michaels kick)0–24
- Baltimore – FG Michaels 19 0–27
- Baltimore – Stukes 60 interception return (Michaels kick)0–34
- Baltimore – Hilton 13 interception return (Michaels kick)0–41
- Pittsburgh – Gros 7 pass from Shiner (Lusteg kick)7–41

==== Week 4 (Saturday October 5, 1968): Cleveland Browns ====
	1	2	3	4	Total
Steelers	3	7	0	7	**17**
**Browns**	7	10	7	14	**38**

at Cleveland Municipal Stadium, Cleveland, Ohio

- Game time:
- Game weather:
- Game attendance: 81,865
- Referee: Fred Swearingen
- TV announcers:

Scoring Drives:

- Pittsburgh – FG Lusteg 25 3–0
- Cleveland – Leigh 20 run (Cockroft kick)3–7
- Cleveland – Warfield 28 pass from Nelsen (Cockroft kick)3–14
- Pittsburgh – Jefferson 13 pass from Shiner (Lusteg kick)10–14
- Cleveland – FG Cockroft 27 10–17
- Pittsburgh – Jefferson 13 pass from Shiner (Lusteg kick)10–24
- Cleveland – Kelly 2 run (Cockroft kick)10–31
- Cleveland – Barney 8 lateral from Kelly (Cockroft kick)10–38
- Pittsburgh – Martha 60 fumble return (Lusteg kick)17–38

==== Week 5 (Sunday October 13, 1968): Washington Redskins ====
	1	2	3	4	Total
Steelers	0	10	0	3	**13**
**Redskins**	6	3	7	0	**16**

at D.C. Stadium, Washington, D.C.

- Game time:
- Game weather:
- Game attendance: 50,659
- Referee: Norm Schachter
- TV announcers:

Scoring Drives:

- Washington – Jerry Smith 17 pass from Jurgensen (no kick-fumble)0–6
- Washington – FG Gogolak 24 0–9
- Pittsburgh – FG Lusteg 24 3–9
- Pittsburgh – Jefferson 33 pass from Shiner (Lusteg kick)10–9
- Washington – Jerry Smith 49 pass from Jurgensen (Gogolak kick)10–16
- Pittsburgh – FG Lusteg 30 13–16

==== Week 6 (Sunday October 20, 1968): New Orleans Saints ====
	1	2	3	4	Total
**Saints**	3	7	3	3	**16**
Steelers	0	6	6	0	**12**

at Pitt Stadium, Pittsburgh, Pennsylvania

- Game time:
- Game weather:
- Game attendance: 32,303
- Referee: Bud Brubaker
- TV announcers:

Scoring Drives:

- New Orleans – FG Durkee 23 0–3
- New Orleans – Wheelwright 1 run (Durkee kick)0–10
- Pittsburgh – Gros 2 run (kick failed)6–10
- Pittsburgh – Hoak 71 run (kick failed)12–10
- New Orleans – FG Durkee 37 12–13
- New Orleans – FG Durkee 31 12–16

==== Week 7 (Sunday October 27, 1968): Philadelphia Eagles ====
	1	2	3	4	Total
Eagles	0	3	0	0	**3**
**Steelers**	0	0	0	6	**6**

at Pitt Stadium, Pittsburgh, Pennsylvania

- Game time:
- Game weather:
- Game attendance: 26,908
- Referee: Jim Tunney
- TV announcers:

Scoring Drives:

- Philadelphia – FG Baker 38 0–3
- Pittsburgh – FG Lusteg 34 3–3
- Pittsburgh – FG Lusteg 15 6–3
- This game was dubbed the "O. J. Bowl" as it was rumored that the losing team would get to draft O. J. Simpson. He would eventually be drafted by the Buffalo Bills.

==== Week 8 (Sunday November 3, 1968): Atlanta Falcons ====
	1	2	3	4	Total
**Steelers**	14	7	13	7	**41**
Falcons	0	0	7	14	**21**

at Atlanta Stadium, Atlanta

- Game time:
- Game weather:
- Game attendance: 47,727
- Referee: George Rennix
- TV announcers:

Scoring Drives:

- Pittsburgh – Jefferson 27 pass from Shiner (Lusteg kick)7–0
- Pittsburgh – Jefferson 61 pass from Shiner (Lusteg kick)14–0
- Pittsburgh – Shy 3 run (Lusteg kick)21–0
- Pittsburgh – Jefferson 9 pass from Shiner (Lusteg kick)28–0
- Pittsburgh – Gros 1 run (kick blocked)34–0
- Atlanta – Ogden 29 pass from Berry (Etter kick)34–7* Atlanta – Harris 55 pass from Berry (Etter kick)34–14
- Pittsburgh – Jefferson 38 pass from Nix (Lusteg kick)41–14
- Atlanta – Long 24 pass from Berry (Etter kick)41–21

==== Week 9 (Sunday November 10, 1968): St. Louis Cardinals ====
	1	2	3	4	Total
Steelers	14	7	7	0	**28**
Cardinals	0	0	21	7	**28**

at Busch Memorial Stadium, St. Louis, Missouri

- Game time:
- Game weather:
- Game attendance: 45,432
- Referee: Norm Schachter
- TV announcers:

Scoring Drives:

- Pittsburgh – Hoak 30 pass from Shiner (Lusteg kick)7–0
- Pittsburgh – Jefferson 80 punt return (Lusteg kick)14–0
- Pittsburgh – Gros 21 pass from Shiner (Lusteg kick)21–0
- St. Louis – Williams 71 pass from Hart (Bakken kick)21–7
- St. Louis – Williams 11 pass from Hart (Bakken kick)21–14
- St. Louis – Conrad 80 pass from Hart (Bakken kick)21–21
- Pittsburgh – Jefferson 52 pass from Shiner (Lusteg kick)28–21
- St. Louis – Roland 1 run (Bakken kick)28–28

==== Week 10 (Sunday November 17, 1968): Cleveland Browns ====
	1	2	3	4	Total
**Browns**	14	10	0	14	**38**
Steelers	7	3	0	21	**31**

at Pitt Stadium, Pittsburgh, Pennsylvania

- Game time:
- Game weather:
- Game attendance: 41,572
- Referee: Fred Swearingen
- TV announcers:

Scoring Drives:

- Cleveland – Kelly 7 run (Cockroft kick)0–7
- Pittsburgh – Wilburn 10 pass from Shiner (Lusteg kick)7–7
- Cleveland – Green 62 pass from Nelsen (Cockroft kick)7–14
- Pittsburgh – FG Lusteg 13 10–14
- Cleveland – Green 11 pass from Nelsen (Cockroft kick)10–21
- Cleveland – FG Cockroft 27 10–24
- Cleveland – Morin 2 pass from Nelsen (Cockroft kick)17–24
- Pittsburgh – May 27 interception (Lusteg kick)24–24
- Cleveland – Warfield 36 pass from Ryan (Cockroft kick)24–31
- Pittsburgh – Wilburn 19 pass from Shiner (Lusteg kick)31–31
- Cleveland – Harraway 33 pass from Ryan (Cockroft kick)31–38

==== Week 11 (Sunday November 24, 1968): San Francisco 49ers ====
	1	2	3	4	Total
**49ers**	14	21	3	7	**45**
Steelers	7	7	0	14	**28**

at Pitt Stadium, Pittsburgh, Pennsylvania

- Game time:
- Game weather:
- Game attendance: 21,408
- Referee: Tommy Bell
- TV announcers:

Scoring Drives:

- San Francisco – Willard 1 run (Davis kick)0–7
- Pittsburgh – Jefferson 10 pass from Shiner (Lusteg kick)7–7
- San Francisco – Willard 3 run (Davis kick)7–14
- San Francisco – Crow 54 pass from Brodie (Davis kick)7–21
- Pittsburgh – Kotite 20 pass from Shiner (Lusteg kick)14–21
- San Francisco – Lewis 16 pass from Brodie (Davis kick)14–28
- San Francisco – Alexander 66 interception return (Davis kick)14–35
- San Francisco – FG Davis 15 14–38
- Pittsburgh – Kotite 4 pass from Shiner (Lusteg kick)21–38
- Pittsburgh – Jefferson 5 pass from Shiner (Lusteg kick)28–38
- San Francisco – Belk 6 interception return (Davis kick)28–45

==== Week 12 (Sunday December 1, 1968): St. Louis Cardinals ====
	1	2	3	4	Total
**Cardinals**	3	0	0	17	**20**
Steelers	7	3	0	0	**10**

at Pitt Stadium, Pittsburgh, Pennsylvania

- Game time:
- Game weather:
- Game attendance: 22,682
- Referee: Bernie Ulman
- TV announcers:

Scoring Drives:

- Pittsburgh – Hoak 1 run (Lusteg kick)7–0
- St. Louis – FG Bakken 22 7–3
- Pittsburgh – FG Lusteg 24 10–3
- St. Louis – Smith 34 run (Bakken kick) 10–10
- St. Louis – FG Bakken 16 10–13
- St. Louis – Edwards 1 run (Bakken kick)10–20

==== Week 13 (Sunday December 8, 1968): Dallas Cowboys ====
	1	2	3	4	Total
Steelers	0	7	0	0	**7**
**Cowboys**	7	14	0	7	**28**

at Cotton Bowl, Dallas, Texas

- Game time:
- Game weather:
- Game attendance: 55,069
- Referee: Bud Brubaker
- TV announcers:

Scoring Drives:

- Dallas – Baynham 5 pass from Meredith (Clark kick)0–7
- Dallas – Hayes 90 punt return (Clark kick)0–14
- Dallas – Hayes 53 pass from Meredith (Clark kick)0–21
- Pittsburgh – Hilton 37 pass from Shiner (Lusteg kick)7–21
- Dallas – Rentzel 65 pass from Meredith (Clark kick)7–28

==== Week 14 (Sunday December 15, 1968): New Orleans Saints ====
	1	2	3	4	Total
Steelers	7	0	0	7	**14**
**Saints**	7	14	0	3	**24**

at Tulane Stadium, New Orleans, Louisiana

- Game time: 1:00 p.m. CST
- Game weather: Sunny, 37 degrees
- Game attendance: 66,131
- Referee:
- TV announcers:

Scoring Drives:

- New Orleans – Lorick 22 pass from Kilmer (Durkee kick)0–7
- Pittsburgh – Jefferson 55 pass from Shiner (Lusteg kick)7–7
- New Orleans – McCall 25 pass from Kilmer (Durkee kick)7–14
- New Orleans – Brown 53 punt return (Durkee kick)7–21
- New Orleans – FG Durkee 31 7–24
- Pittsburgh – Wilburn 17 pass from Nix (Lusteg kick)14–24

=== Standings ===
NFL Century
	W	L	T	PCT	DIV	CONF	PF	PA	STK
Cleveland Browns	10	4	0	.714	4–2	7–3	394	273	L1
St. Louis Cardinals	9	4	1	.692	5–0–1	8–1–1	325	289	W4
New Orleans Saints	4	9	1	.308	2–4	3–7	246	327	W1
Pittsburgh Steelers	2	11	1	.154	0–5–1	1–8–1	244	397	L5

Note: Tie games were not officially counted in the standings until 1972.
