= List of Pittsburgh Steelers starting quarterbacks =

The Pittsburgh Steelers are a professional American football team in Pittsburgh, Pennsylvania. The Steelers compete in the National Football League (NFL) as a member of the American Football Conference (AFC) North division.

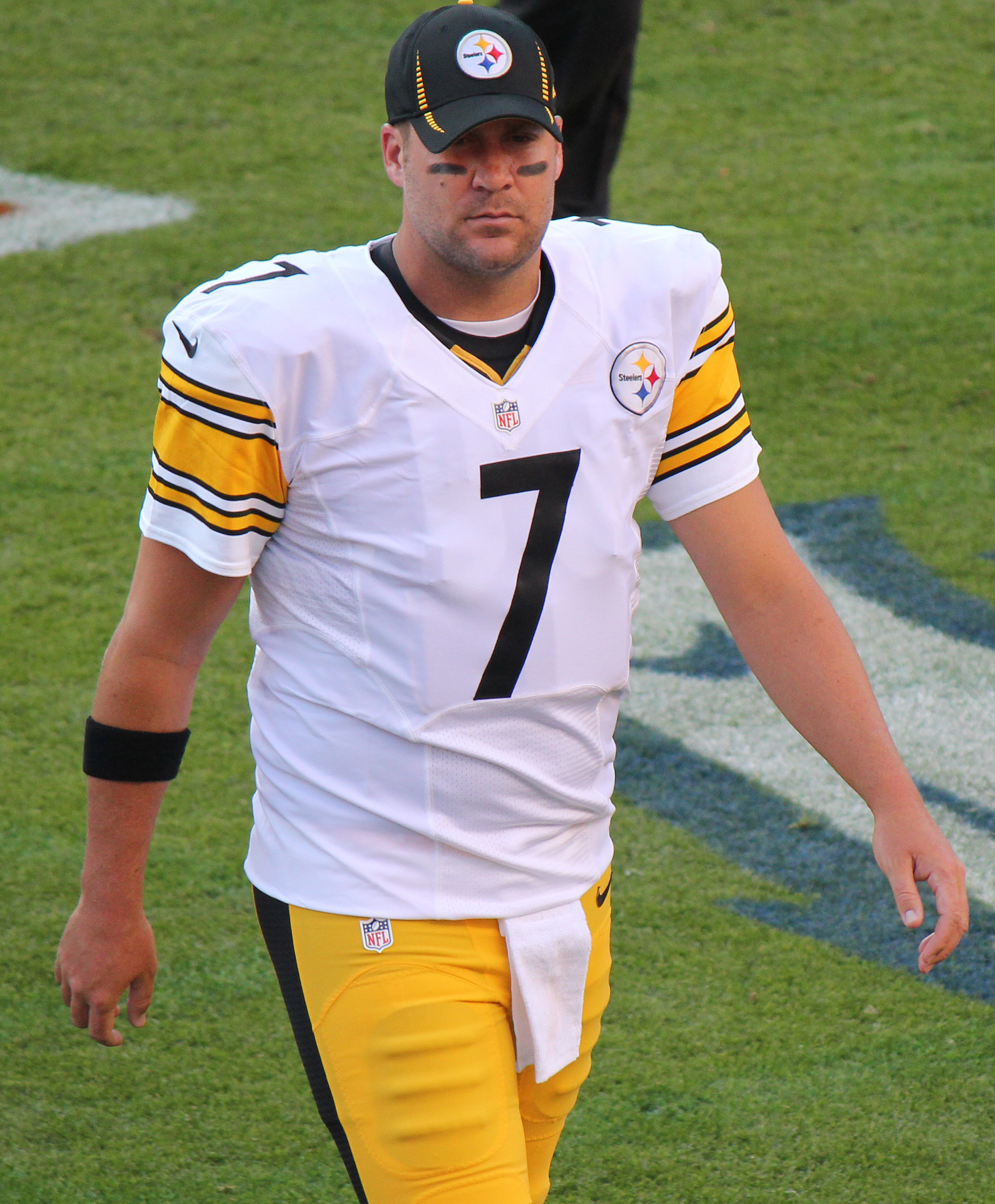
Ben Roethlisberger (2004–2021) started 247 games for the Steelers, the most in franchise history by any player.

The early era of the NFL and American football in general was not conducive to passing the football, with the forward pass not being legalized until the early 1900s and not fully adopted for many more years. Although the quarterback position has historically been the one to receive the snap and thus handle the football on every offensive play, the importance of the position during this era was limited by various rules, like having to be five yards behind the line of scrimmage before a forward pass could be attempted. These rules and the tactical focus on rushing the ball limited the importance of the quarterback position while enhancing the value of different types of backs, such as the halfback and the fullback. Some of these backs were considered triple-threat men, capable of rushing, passing or kicking the football, making it common for multiple players to attempt a pass during a game.

As rules changed and the NFL began adopting a more pass-centric approach to offensive football, the importance of the quarterback position grew. Beginning in 1950, total wins and losses by a team's starting quarterback were tracked. Prior to 1950, the Steelers had numerous players identified as playing the quarterback position. However, the combination of unreliable statistics in the early era of the NFL and the differences in the early quarterback position make tracking starts by quarterbacks impractical for this timeframe.

== Starters per season ==
These quarterbacks have started at least one game for the Pittsburgh Steelers.

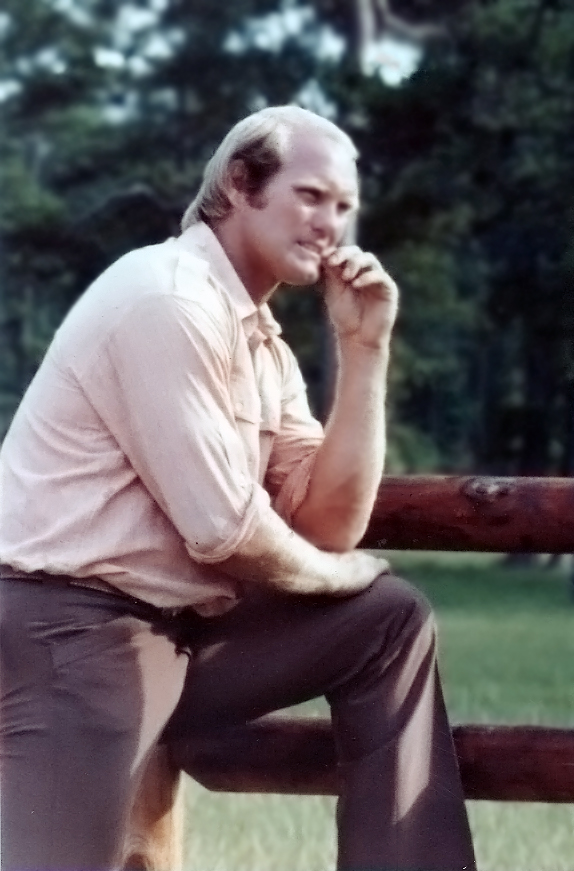
Terry Bradshaw (1970–1983) started 158 games at quarterback for the Steelers, the second-most in franchise history.

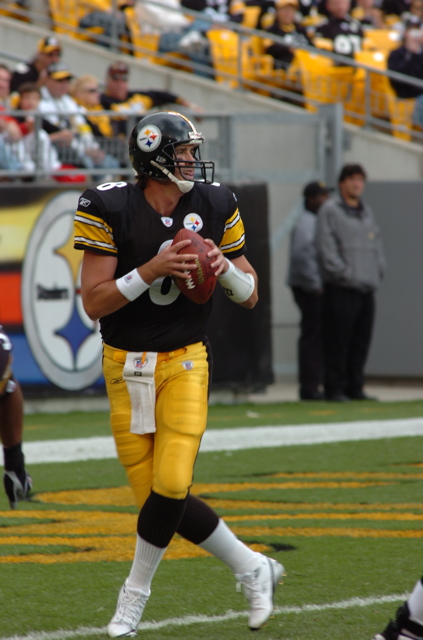
Tommy Maddox (2002–2004)

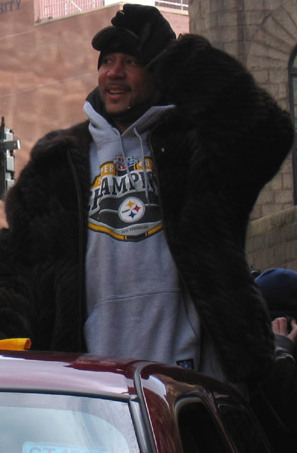
Charlie Batch (2005–2006, 2010–2012)

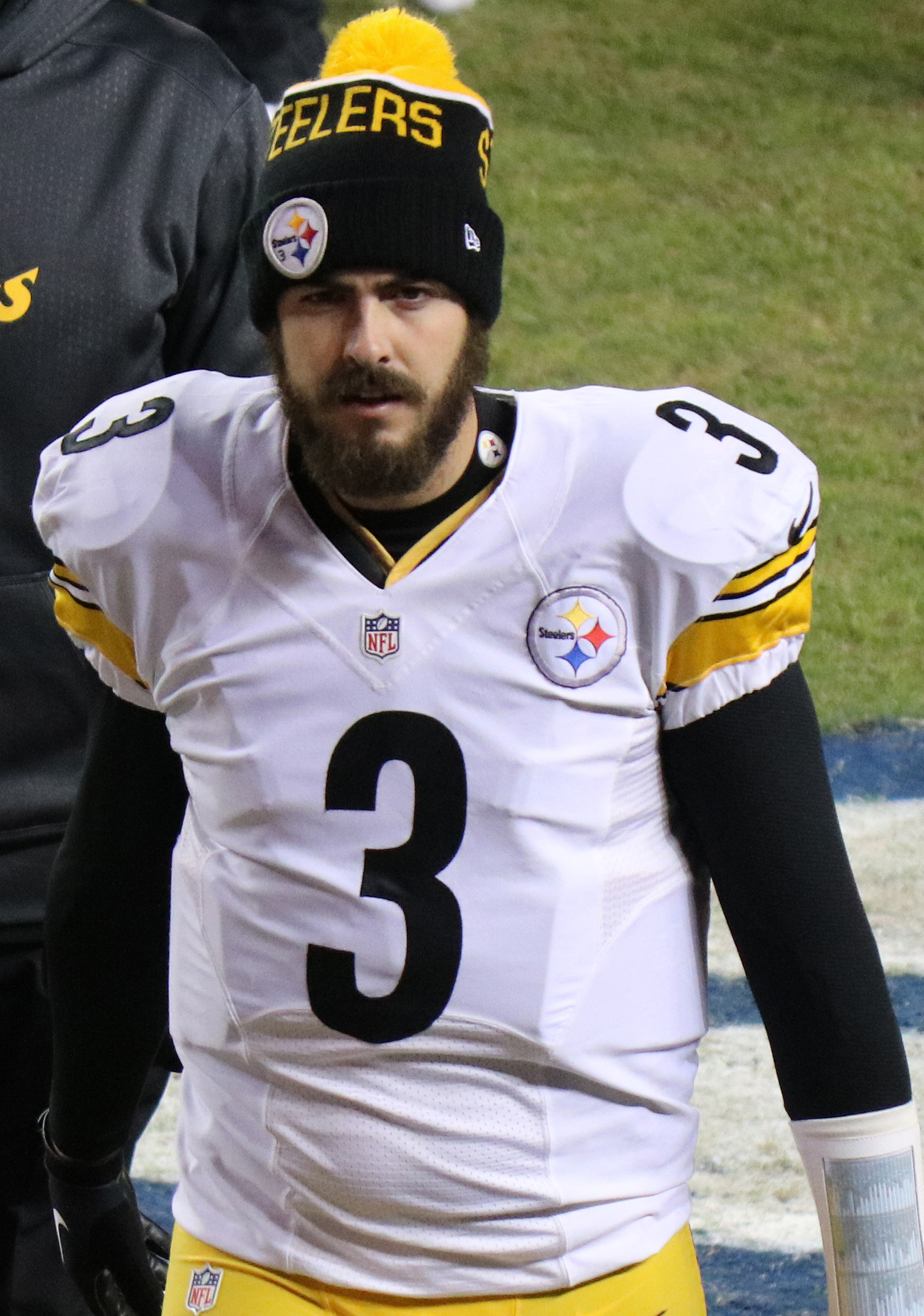
Landry Jones (2015–2017)

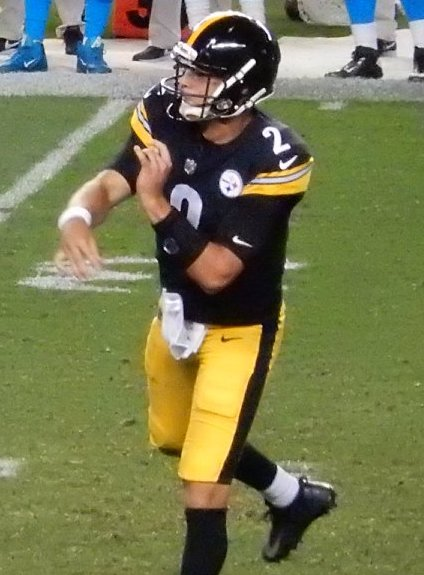
Mason Rudolph (2019–2021, 2023, 2025)

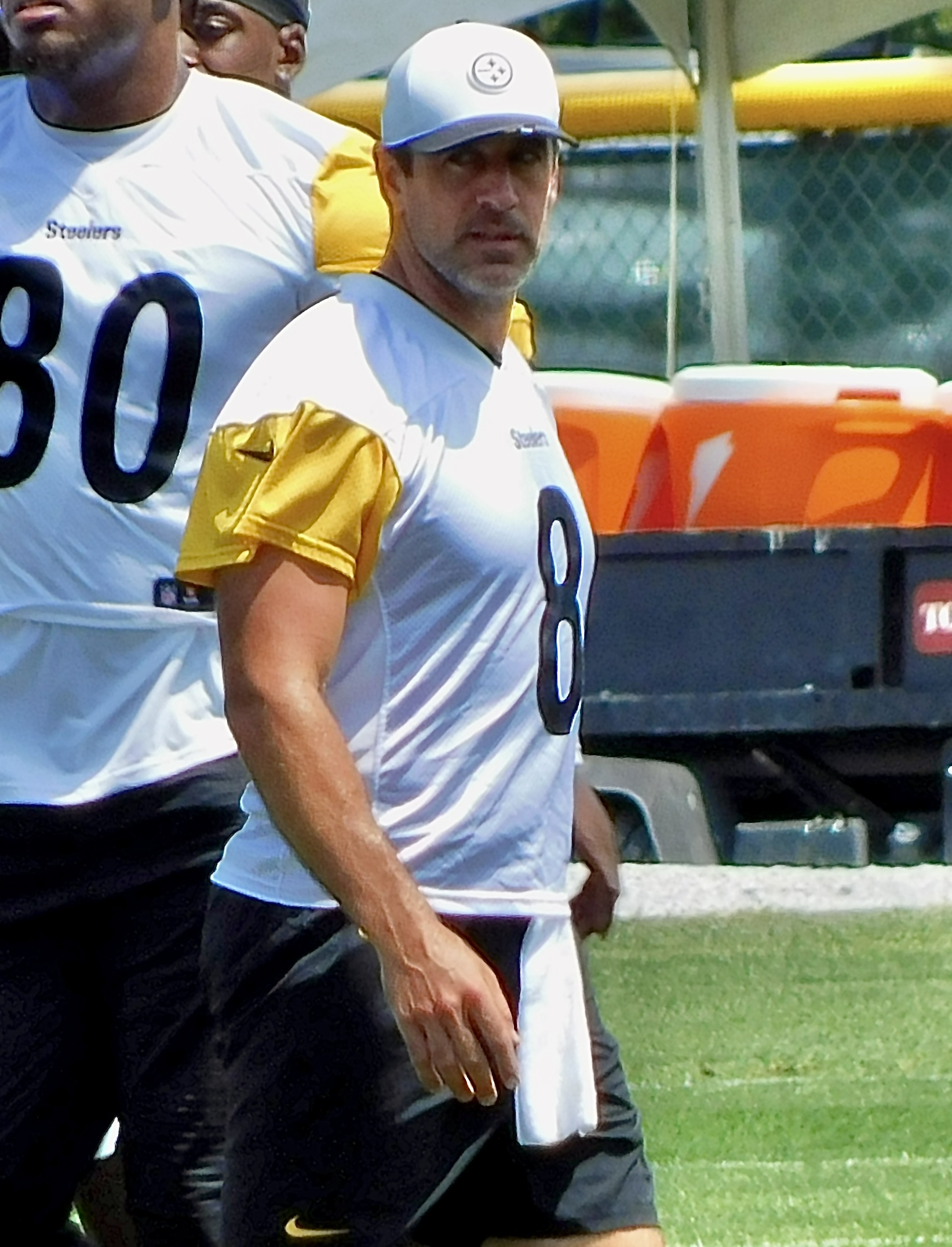
Aaron Rodgers (2025–present)

The number of games they started during the season is listed to the right of their name:

Season	Regular season	Postseason	References
1950	Joe Geri		
1951	Joe Geri / Chuck Ortmann		
1952	Jim Finks (12)		
1953	Jim Finks (9) / Bill Mackrides (3)		
1954	Jim Finks (12)		
1955	Jim Finks (12)		
1956	Ted Marchibroda (11) / Jack Scarbath (1)		
1957	Earl Morrall (11) / Len Dawson (1)		
1958	Bobby Layne (10) / Earl Morrall (2)		
1959	Bobby Layne (12)		
1960	Bobby Layne (9) / Rudy Bukich (3)		
1961	Rudy Bukich (8) / Bobby Layne (6)		
1962	Bobby Layne (11) / Ed Brown (3)		
1963	Ed Brown (14)		
1964	Ed Brown (13) / Bill Nelsen (1)		
1965	Bill Nelsen (12) / Tommy Wade (2)		
1966	Ron C. Smith (7) / Bill Nelsen (5) / George Izo (2)		
1967	Kent Nix (9) / Bill Nelsen (5)		
1968	Dick Shiner (11) / Kent Nix (3)		
1969	Dick Shiner (9) / Terry Hanratty (5)		
1970	Terry Bradshaw (8) / Terry Hanratty (6)		
1971	Terry Bradshaw (13) / Terry Hanratty (1)		
1972	Terry Bradshaw (14)	Terry Bradshaw (1–1)	
1973	Terry Bradshaw (9) / Terry Hanratty (4) / Joe Gilliam (1)	Terry Bradshaw (0–1)	
1974	Terry Bradshaw (7) / Joe Gilliam (6) / Terry Hanratty (1)	Terry Bradshaw (3–0)	
1975	Terry Bradshaw (14)	Terry Bradshaw (3–0)	
1976	Terry Bradshaw (8) / Mike Kruczek (6)	Terry Bradshaw (1–1)	
1977	Terry Bradshaw (14)	Terry Bradshaw (0–1)	
1978	Terry Bradshaw (16)	Terry Bradshaw (3–0)	
1979	Terry Bradshaw (16)	Terry Bradshaw (3–0)	
1980	Terry Bradshaw (15) / Cliff Stoudt (1)		
1981	Terry Bradshaw (14) / Mark Malone (2)		
1982	Terry Bradshaw (9)	Terry Bradshaw (0–1)	
1983	Cliff Stoudt (15) / Terry Bradshaw (1)	Cliff Stoudt (0–1)	
1984	Mark Malone (9) / David Woodley (7)	Mark Malone (1–1)	
1985	Mark Malone (8) / David Woodley (6) / Scott Campbell (2)		
1986	Mark Malone (14) / Bubby Brister (2)		
1987	Mark Malone (12) / Steve Bono (3)		
1988	Bubby Brister (13) / Todd Blackledge (3)		
1989	Bubby Brister (14) / Todd Blackledge (2)	Bubby Brister (1–1)	
1990	Bubby Brister (16)		
1991	Neil O'Donnell (8) / Bubby Brister (8)		
1992	Neil O'Donnell (12) / Bubby Brister (4)	Neil O'Donnell (0–1)	
1993	Neil O'Donnell (15) / Mike Tomczak (1)	Neil O'Donnell (0–1)	
1994	Neil O'Donnell (14) / Mike Tomczak (2)	Neil O'Donnell (1–1)	
1995	Neil O'Donnell (12) / Mike Tomczak (4)	Neil O'Donnell (2–1)	
1996	Mike Tomczak (15) / Jim Miller (1)	Mike Tomczak (1–1)	
1997	Kordell Stewart (16)	Kordell Stewart (1–1)	
1998	Kordell Stewart (16)		
1999	Kordell Stewart (12) / Mike Tomczak (4)		
2000	Kordell Stewart (11) / Kent Graham (5)		
2001	Kordell Stewart (16)	Kordell Stewart (1–1)	
2002	Tommy Maddox (11) / Kordell Stewart (5)	Tommy Maddox (1–1)	
2003	Tommy Maddox (16)		
2004	Ben Roethlisberger (13) / Tommy Maddox (3)	Ben Roethlisberger (1–1)	
2005	Ben Roethlisberger (12) / Tommy Maddox (2) / Charlie Batch (2)	Ben Roethlisberger (4–0)	
2006	Ben Roethlisberger (15) / Charlie Batch (1)		
2007	Ben Roethlisberger (15) / Charlie Batch (1)	Ben Roethlisberger (0–1)	
2008	Ben Roethlisberger (16)	Ben Roethlisberger (3–0)	
2009	Ben Roethlisberger (15) / Dennis Dixon (1)		
2010	Ben Roethlisberger (12) / Charlie Batch (2) / Dennis Dixon (2)	Ben Roethlisberger (2–1)	
2011	Ben Roethlisberger (15) / Charlie Batch (1)	Ben Roethlisberger (0–1)	
2012	Ben Roethlisberger (13) / Charlie Batch (2) / Byron Leftwich (1)		
2013	Ben Roethlisberger (16)		
2014	Ben Roethlisberger (16)	Ben Roethlisberger (0–1)	
2015	Ben Roethlisberger (11) / Michael Vick (3) / Landry Jones (2)	Ben Roethlisberger (1–1)	
2016	Ben Roethlisberger (14) / Landry Jones (2)	Ben Roethlisberger (2–1)	
2017	Ben Roethlisberger (15) / Landry Jones (1)	Ben Roethlisberger (0–1)	
2018	Ben Roethlisberger (16)		
2019	Mason Rudolph (8) / Devlin Hodges (6) / Ben Roethlisberger (2)		
2020	Ben Roethlisberger (15) / Mason Rudolph (1)	Ben Roethlisberger (0–1)	
2021	Ben Roethlisberger (16) / Mason Rudolph (1)	Ben Roethlisberger (0–1)	
2022	Kenny Pickett (12) / Mitchell Trubisky (5)		
2023	Kenny Pickett (12) / Mason Rudolph (3) / Mitchell Trubisky (2)	Mason Rudolph (0–1)	
2024	Russell Wilson (11) / Justin Fields (6)	Russell Wilson (0–1)	
2025	Aaron Rodgers (16) / Mason Rudolph (1)	Aaron Rodgers (0–1)	
2026	Aaron Rodgers (9)		

== Most games started ==
These quarterbacks have the most starts for the Steelers in regular season games.

	Name	Period	Starts	Wins	Losses	Ties	Win %
1	Ben Roethlisberger	2004–21	247	165	81	1	.670
2	Terry Bradshaw	1970–83	158	107	51	0	.677
3	Kordell Stewart	1997–2002	75	46	29	0	.613
4	Neil O'Donnell	1991–95	61	39	22	0	.639
5	Bubby Brister	1986–92	57	28	29	0	.491

== Team career passing records ==
Name	Completions	Attempts	Completion %	Yards	Touchdowns	Interceptions	Passer rating
Ben Roethlisberger	5,440	8,443	64.4	64,088	418	211	93.5
Terry Bradshaw	2,025	3,901	51.9	27,989	212	210	70.9
Kordell Stewart	1,190	2,107	56.5	13,328	70	72	72.3
Neil O'Donnell	1,069	1,871	57.1	12,867	68	39	81.8
Bubby Brister	776	1,477	52.5	10,104	51	57	69.8
Bobby Layne	569	1,159	49.2	9,030	66	78	65.5

== See also ==
- Lists of NFL starting quarterbacks
