= Roy Jefferson =

American football player (born 1943)

- Jefferson in 1970

No. 87, 80
- Position: Wide receiver

Personal information
- Born: November 9, 1943 (age 82); Texarkana, Arkansas, U.S.
- Listed height: 6 ft 2 in (1.88 m)
- Listed weight: 195 lb (88 kg)

Career information
- High school: Compton (Compton, California)
- College: Utah
- NFL draft: 1965: 2nd round, 18th overall pick
- AFL draft: 1965: 2nd round, 14th overall pick

Career history
- Pittsburgh Steelers (1965–1969); Baltimore Colts (1970); Washington Redskins (1971–1976)

Awards and highlights
- Super Bowl champion (V); First-team All-Pro (1969); 2× Second-team All-Pro (1968, 1971); 3× Pro Bowl (1968, 1969, 1971); NFL receiving yards leader (1968); 80 Greatest Redskins; Pittsburgh Steelers Legends team; First-team All-American (1964)

Career NFL statistics
- Receptions: 451
- Receiving yards: 7,539
- Receiving touchdowns: 52
- Stats at Pro Football Reference

Roy Lee Jefferson (November 9, 1943) is an American former professional football player who was a wide receiver in the National Football League (NFL) for 12 seasons with the Pittsburgh Steelers, Baltimore Colts, and Washington Redskins. He played college football for the Utah Utes. During 162 regular season games in the NFL, he had 451 receptions for 7,539 yards and 52 touchdowns. He played in Super Bowls V and VII.

== Early life ==
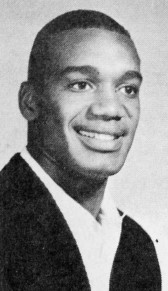
Roy Jefferson in 1964.

Jefferson was born on November 9, 1943, in Texarkana, Arkansas. He grew up in Southern California and graduated from Compton High School in 1961. He played basketball and football at Compton. His Compton High football team jersey number 80 was retired in 2018, in the school's Hall of Fame jersey retirement celebration.

In 2016, Jefferson was one of five Compton alumni honored in a "Golden Five" ceremony, celebrating those Compton alumni who played in the Super Bowl.

== College football ==
He played college football at the University of Utah in Salt Lake City, where he was on the varsity from 1962-64, leading the team in scoring each one of those years. He was also named to the All- Western Athletic Conference (WAC) team on offense in those three years.

In 1963, he led the WAC in pass receptions (29), receiving yards (435), and receiving touchdowns (4), and was third in average yards per reception. He was the only unanimous first-team selection to the All-WAC team.

In 1964 as a senior, Jefferson received All-WAC honors again, and was named the Western Athletic Conference Player of the Year under head coach Ray Nagel, the 1964 WAC Coach of the Year. He was second in voting for United Press International's (UPI) WAC Player of the Year (behind Stan Quintana). He was also an Associated Press (AP) All-America honorable mention.

Jefferson played on both sides of the ball, as both receiver and running back on offense, as well playing defensive back. He was also the team's placekicker. In his senior season (1964), Jefferson had 21 pass receptions, three interceptions, and kicked 17 extra points and two field goals. Making key pass receptions, he led the Utes to a 32–6 victory in the Liberty Bowl over favored West Virginia, to finish with an overall 9–2 record that year. The game was played indoors on natural grass at the convention center in Atlantic City, New Jersey, and featured shortened end zones.

Jefferson received the Amizich Award for outstanding lineman (as an end) at Utah in his senior season. He was to play in the 1964 East-West Shrine game, but an injury in the Liberty Bowl kept him out of the game.

== Professional career ==
Jefferson was a 6 ft 2 in (1.88 m), 195 lb (88 kg) receiver, who was nicknamed "Sweet Pea".

=== Pittsburgh Steelers ===
Selected in the second round of the 1965 NFL draft, 18th overall, Jefferson spent his first five NFL seasons with the Pittsburgh Steelers (1965–1969). In 1968, Jefferson led the NFL in receiving yards with 1,074, and tied for the league lead in punt returns (28). His 58 receptions and 11 touchdowns were both 2nd highest in the NFL that season. He was third in punt return average (9.8 yards/return) and scored one touchdown on a punt return. Jefferson finished the 1969 season with a career-high 67 receptions for 1,079 yards and nine touchdowns, and became the first Steelers receiver to post back-to-back 1,000-yard seasons. In his five Steelers' seasons, Jefferson started 56 of the 65 regular season games in which he played, with 199 receptions for 3,671 yards (18.4 average) and 29 touchdowns.

He was selected to the Pro Bowl in 1968 and 1969. In 1968, he was named second-team All Pro by the Associated Press, Newspaper Enterprise Association (NEA), and United Press International, and first-team All-Conference by The Sporting News. He was named first-team All-Pro by the AP, NEA, UPI, Pro Football Weekly, and the New York Daily News in 1969.

Jefferson was named to the Pittsburgh Steelers Legends team in 2007, as one of the best 24 Steelers players from 1933 to 1970.

=== Baltimore Colts ===
Despite being the Steelers' best offensive player, conflicts with head coach Chuck Noll as the team's player representative resulted in a trade to the Baltimore Colts for Willie Richardson and a 1971 fourth-round selection (104th overall–Dwight White) in an exchange of receivers who had fallen out of favor with their old teams on August 20, 1970. With the Colts for only one season, Jefferson helped them reach and win Super Bowl V. He finished the 1970 regular season with 44 receptions for 749 yards and seven touchdowns. He caught a 45-yard touchdown pass from Johnny Unitas in the Colts 17–0 divisional playoff win over the Cincinnati Bengals, and caught a 9-yard touchdown pass from Unitas while dragging a defender into the endzone. Jefferson had three receptions for 52 yards in the Colts 16–13 victory over the Dallas Cowboys in the Super Bowl.

After coming from the 1–13 Steelers in 1969, and winning the Super Bowl with the Colts in 1970, his one year with the Colts was his favorite season in the NFL. His Colts teammate and roommate John Mackey was his hero. Mackey was the first president of the National Football League Players Association (NFLPA), and Jefferson was one of the NFL players most prominently involved with the NFLPA as a player representative, and in the 1974 players' strike.

=== Washington Redskins ===
A contract dispute with the Colts ended with Jefferson being dealt along with ninth-round draft picks in 1973 (218th overall–Rick Galbos) and 1974 (213th overall–traded to Los Angeles Rams for Joe Sweet) to the Washington Redskins for Cotton Speyrer and a 1973 first-rounder (25th overall–traded to San Diego Chargers for Marty Domres) on July 31, 1971. He spent six seasons with the Redskins under head coach George Allen, helping them reach Super Bowl VII in 1972, and retired after the 1976 season.

In his first Washington season, he caught 47 passes (his high with the team), and was selected to play in the 1971 Pro Bowl. The AP and Pro Football Weekly named Jefferson first-team All-Conference. Over the next three years, he caught 119 passes for nearly 1,800 yards. The team reached the playoffs in five of his six years in Washington.

In 2012, he was selected as one of the 80 greatest Washington players.

== After football ==
After his retirement from football, Jefferson has remained in the Washington, D.C. area, in Annandale, Virginia, with Candie, his wife of over 50 years. He had a leading role in the 1976 blaxploitation feature film Brotherhood of Death. The film, shot in Montgomery County, Maryland, was about three small-town African-American men who go to fight in the Vietnam War, then return to the U.S. to battle racial injustice in their hometown. It is one of Quentin Tarantino's favorite films.

In the ensuing years, his endeavors have included owning a chain of barbecue restaurants with the last closing in 1992 and owning a catering business. As of 2006, he was working in the real estate business. He reported that he and his wife had three children and five grandchildren.

== NFL career statistics ==
Legend
	Super Bowl champion
	Led the league
**Bold**	Career high

=== Regular season ===
Year	Team	Games		Receiving				
Year	Team	GP	GS	Rec	Yds	Avg	Lng	TD
1965	PIT	10	4	13	287	22.1	50	1
1966	PIT	**14**	**14**	32	772	**24.1**	**84**	4
1967	PIT	13	11	29	459	15.8	58	4
1968	PIT	**14**	13	58	1,074	18.5	62	**11**
1969	PIT	**14**	**14**	**67**	**1,079**	16.1	63	9
1970	BAL	**14**	**14**	44	749	17.0	55	7
1971	WAS	**14**	**14**	47	701	14.9	70	4
1972	WAS	**14**	**14**	35	550	15.7	45	3
1973	WAS	**14**	**14**	41	595	14.5	36	1
1974	WAS	**14**	13	43	654	15.2	43	4
1975	WAS	13	5	15	255	17.0	36	2
1976	WAS	**14**	**14**	27	364	13.5	27	2
Career		162	144	451	7,539	16.7	84	52

== Personal life ==
In early 1965, Jefferson led a march protesting racial bias in Salt Lake City, in front of the headquarters of The Church of Jesus Christ of Latter-day Saints. Jefferson is the cousin of tight end Marv Fleming; they were teammates in high school and college, but were on opposing sides during Super Bowl VII. Jefferson left Utah for the NFL in 1965, but returned to school in the off-seasons and completed his bachelor's degree in June 1970.
