= Virginia Sports Hall of Fame and Museum =

Hall of Fame in Virginia Beach, Virginia

The Virginia Sports Hall of Fame, located in Virginia Beach, Virginia, honors athletes, coaches, administrators, journalists and other contributors to athletics in Virginia. Many of the more than 350 inductees since 1972 were born in Virginia or enjoyed success in college, professional, amateur or Olympic sports after moving to the state. Each April the Virginia Sports Hall of Fame inducts new members into its ranks.

From 2005-2017, the Hall of Fame operated a museum in Portsmouth. In 2017, to reduce expenses and dependence on government support as well as increase sponsorship interest, it changed its business model, closing the building in Portsmouth and moving its operations to Town Center in nearby Virginia Beach. There it placed many of its educational exhibits and Hall of Honor, listing all inductees, in high-rise office and hotel lobbies within that popular mixed-use development. It made the displays accessible to the public through a novel and free pedestrian tour called "Walk the Hall" and began hosting a variety of sports oriented programs throughout Town Center of Virginia Beach, where its offices are now situated. The non-profit changed its website address to www.VaSportsHOF.com.

The Hall of Fame has a statewide board of directors and an Honors Court that receives and reviews nominations of potential inductees, announcing its selections each December.

== Sports inductees ==
A

- Brandon Adair (2025 - Basketball)
- Allen, George (1998 - Football)
- Allen, Franklin (2013 - Basketball)
- Allen, Sonny (2022 - Basketball)
- Alley, Gene (1989 - Baseball)
- Anders, Beth (2017 - Field Hockey)
- Anthony, Kim Hamilton (2017 - Gymnastics)
- Andrews, Donna (2005 - Golf)
- Arritt, Fletcher (2015 - Basketball)
- Ashe Jr., Arthur (1979 - Tennis)
- Augustus, Peggy (1999 - Equestrian)

B

- Barber, Rondé (2014 - Football)
- Barber, Tiki (2011 - Football)
- Bass, Marvin (1981 - Football)
- Beamer, Frank (2018)
- Beard, Edward (2002 - Football)
- Bennett, Tony (2026 - Basketball)
- Bennett, William (2002 - Track)
- Blassingham, Melvin (1982 - Contributor)
- Bly, Dre (2017 - Football)
- Bogaczyk, Jack (2017 - Media)
- Bonner, Dan (2025 - Basketball)
- Boone, Chuck (2004 - Baseball)
- Boone, Chuck (2004 - Football)
- Brennaman, Marty (1999 - Media)
- Brill, Bill (1999 - Media)
- Bristow, Allan (1997 - Basketball)
- Brooks, Larry (2000 - Football)
- Brown, Ruben (2019)
- Brown, Cherie Greer (2015 - Lacrosse)
- Brown, Cornell (2013 - Football)
- Brown, Roger (1997 - Football)
- Brown Jr., Roosevelt (1979 - Football)
- Bryan, Jimmie (1987 - Basketball)
- Bryant, J.C. (1984 - Football)
- Bryant, J.C. (1984 - Track)
- Bumbry, Alonza (2002 - Baseball)
- Burrows Jr., Harold (1990 - Tennis)
- Burton, Jeff (2019)
- Burton, Lawrence (2013 - Football)
- Bussard, Raymond (2000 - Swimming)

C

- Carneal, Herb (2002 - Media)
- Carpenter, Hunter (1973 - Football)
- Carter, Dennis (2020)
- Casey, Alfred (1982 - Football)
- Casey, Sean (2014 - Baseball)
- Catlett, Nellie (1994 - Football)
- Caughron, Harry (2009 - Football)
- Chambers Jr., William (1995 - Basketball)
- Chandler, Joseph (1979 - Track)
- Chenery, Christopher (1985 - Equestrian)
- Chewning, Lynn (1991 - Football)
- Clark, Gary (2007 - Football)
- Cloud, Jack (1984 - Football)
- Coates, Jim (1994 - Baseball)
- Cochran, Bill (2009 - Media)
- Colander Clark, LaTasha (2014 - Track)
- Colston, James (2007 - Media)
- Coles, Bimbo (2017 - Basketball)
- Conn, Julius (1976 - Basketball)
- Cook, Murray (2026 - Baseball)
- Corrigan, Euguene F. (2007 - Contributor)
- Corrigan, Euguene F. (2007 - Lacrosse)
- Crane, Eddie (2000 - Media)
- Creekmur, Lou (1989 - Football)
- Crenshaw, Fanny (1988 - Field Hockey)
- Cubbage, Mike (2020)
- Cuddyer, Michael (2018)
- Culley, Jennings (1998 - Media)
- Cummins, Ralph (1996 - Football)
- Curry, Dell (2004 - Basketball)

D

- Dale, Carroll (1976 - Football)
- Dandridge, Raymond (1999 - Baseball)
- Dandridge, Robert (1992 - Basketball)
- Davis, Jean (1976 - Equestrian)
- Davis, Meb (1984 - Football)
- Day, Leon (2002 - Baseball)
- Day, Roland (1979 - Football)
- Deekins, William (2002 - Media)
- Delong, Steve (2000 - Football)
- Dodd, Robert (1973 - Football)
- Dolan, Tom (2009 - Swimming)
- Dombrowski, Jim (2010 - Football)
- Donovan, Anne (1996 - Basketball)
- Doran, Albert (1995 - Basketball)
- Doughty, Doug (2018)
- Douglas, Otis (1979 - Football)
- Driesell, Charles (1995 - Basketball)
- Driscoll, Terry (2026 - Administrator)
- Driver, James (1998 - Contributor)
- Driver, James (1998 - Football)
- Ducibella, Jim (2010 - Media)
- Dudley, Bill (1974 - Football)
- Duquette, Tom (2009 - Lacrosse)
- Durden, Chauncey (1997 - Media)

E

- Easley Jr., Kenneth (1998 - Football)
- Eason, James (1990 - Football)
- Ehlers, Dean (2013 - Administration)
- Ellis, Jill (2024 - Soccer)
- Esleeck, Karl (1977 - Football)

F

- Faison, Earl (1989 - Football)
- Fales, Donna (1997 - Tennis)
- Farrior, James (2016 - Football)
- Feathers, Beattie (1981 - Football)
- Fletcher, Richard (1989 - Football)
- Flippin, Dr. Harrison (1975 - Track)
- Foiles, Henry (1987 - Baseball)
- Freeman, Antonio (2012 - Football)
- Fuller, William (2004 - Football)
- Fulton, Stokeley (1977 - Football)

G

- George, Ed (2025 - Football)
- Giles, Vinny (1976 - Golf)
- Gillette Jr., James (1983 - Football)
- Gillette, Walker (1990 - Football)
- Goldblatt, Abe (1997 - Media)
- Gooch, William (1986 - Contributor)
- Gooch, William (1986 - Football)
- Grubb, Johnny (2015 - Baseball)
- Guback, Steve (2005 - Media)

H

- Hahn, Archie (1991 - Track)
- Haley, Charles (2006 - Football)
- Hall, DeAngelo (2023 - Football)
- Hamner, Granny (1981 - Baseball)
- Harper, Chandler (1973 - Golf)
- Hartman, Chuck (2018)
- Hatcher, Paul (2015 - Basketball)
- Havens, Frank (1995 - Canoeing)
- Hedgepeth, Whitney (2010 - Swimming)
- Henderson, Gerald (2012 - Basketball)
- Hendrick, Ray (2012 - Auto Racing)
- Hightower-Boothe, Yogi (2001 - Field Hockey)
- Hill, Grant (2026 - Basketball)
- Hilton, John (2008 - Football)
- Holland, Bob (1997 - Surfing)
- Holland, Terry (2003 - Basketball)
- Hooker, Lester (1983 - Basketball)
- Hoskins, Stuart (1981 - Football)
- Hoskins, Stuart (1981 - Baseball)
- Hucles, Angela (2015 - Soccer)
- Hucles, Henry (1997 - Basketball)
- Hughes, George (1983 - Football)
- Humbert, Dr. Richard (1981 - Football)
- Hunley, Rick (2008 - Football)

J

- Jackson, William (1979 - Football)
- Jacox, Calvin Moses (2006 - Media)
- Janssen, Mary Patton (2001 - Golf)
- Jarrett, Dr. Jim (2011 - Contributor)
- Jaynes, Betty (2008 - Basketball)
- Jeffrey, Rick (2024 - Administration)
- Johnson, Lawrence (2020)
- Johnson, Marshall (1997 - Media)
- Johnson, Dr. Robert (1972 - Tennis)
- Jones, Arthur (1975 - Football)
- Jones, Thomas (2018)
- Jordan, Brian (2009 - Football)
- Jordan, Brian (2009 - Baseball)
- Jordan, Henry (1974 - Football)

K

- Karmosky, Charles (1997 - Media)
- Keller, Herman (1992 - Basketball)
- Keller, Ted (2005 - Football)
- Kellogg, Junius (1990 - Basketball)
- Kersey, Jerome (2008 - Basketball)
- Kersey, Jess (2012 - Basketball)
- Keyes, Leroy (1987 - Football)
- Kilbourne, Bob (1997 - Basketball)
- Knox, Glenn (1982 - Basketball)
- Krieger, Ali (2025 - Soccer)

L

- Lacy, George (1996 - Baseball)
- Larry, Wendy (2019)
- Lanier, William (1986 - Football)
- Lauterbach, Henry (1999 - Speed Boat Racing)
- Lawrence, Frank (1985 - Baseball)
- Lawson, Kara (2018)
- Laycock, Jimmye (2023 - Football)
- Lazenby, Roland (2026 - Media)
- Leech, Jimmy (1973 - Football)
- Leffler, Bill (2003 - Media)
- Leigh, Doris (1978 - Bowling)
- Lemon, Jim (1988 - Baseball)
- Lenzi, Mark (2019)
- Leonard, Laurence Jr. (1997 - Media)
- Lewis, William (1980 - Football)
- Lex, Joseph (1986 - Football)
- Lieberman, Nancy (1992 - Basketball)
- Lindquist, Jerry (2003 - Media)
- Little, Henry (1975 - Track)
- Littlepage, Bill (2011 - Basketball)
- Littlepage, Craig (2024 - Administration)
- Lloyd, Earl (1993 - Basketball)
- Long, Chris (2024 - Football)
- Loria, Frank (1984 - Football)
- Lugbill, Jon (2022 - Canoe)

M

- Mack, Jane (2009 - Golf)
- Madden, Thad (1988 - Football)
- Mahorn, Rick (2018)
- Malone, Moses (1999 - Basketball)
- Mann, Dr. Thompson (1988 - Swimming)
- Mann, Shelley (1984 - Swimming)
- Mapp, Dr. John (1991 - Football)
- Mapp, Dr. John (1991 - Track)
- Mapp, Laura (2003 - Field Hockey)
- Marshall, Willard (1990 - Baseball)
- Martin, Lily (1995 - Golf)
- Martin Sr., William (1980 - Wrestling)
- Mayer, Eugene (1980 - Football)
- McBride, Penelope (1983 - Tennis)
- McClelland, George (2001 - Media)
- McCorory, Francena (2023 - Track & Field)
- McCullough, Clyde (1983 - Baseball)
- McEver, H.M. (1980 - Football)
- McKenna, John (2007 - Football)
- McLaughlin, Lee (1987 - Football)
- McLelland, Robert (1998 - Media)
- McQuinn, George (1978 - Baseball)
- Mellon, Paul (1999 - Equestrian)
- Merner, William (1990 - Football)
- Merrick, Edwin (1980 - Football)
- Merritt, LaShawn (2024 - Track & Field)
- Messer, Frank (2001 - Media)
- Metheny, Arthur (1979 - Baseball)
- Michaels, Walt (1977 - Football)
- Miles, C.P. (1974 - Football)
- Miller, Heath (2019)
- Miller, Louis (1994 - Baseball)
- Miller, Louis (1994 - Basketball)
- Miller, Marty (2014 - Baseball)
- Miller, Robert (2006 - Football)
- Millsaps, William Jr. (2000 - Media)
- Minium, Harry Jr. (2025 - Media)
- Moir, Charles (2000 - Basketball)
- Moore, Herman (2010 - Football)
- Moore, Shawn (2023 - Football)
- Montgomery, Joe (2023 - Football)
- Morrison, Leotus (2000 - Field Hockey)
- Morrison, Leotus (2000 - Contributor)
- Moseley, Frank (1979 - Football)
- Moskowitz, Bob (2004 - Media)
- Mosley, Benita (1998 - Track)
- Mourning, Alonzo (2010 - Basketball)
- Muha, Joseph (1976 - Football)
- Murray, Rich (2016 - Media)

N

- Nemetz, Albert (1986 - Football)
- Newman, Johnny (2011 - Basketball)
- Norton, Hank (2006 - Football)
- Nunnally, Hal (2024 - Basketball)

O

- O'Brien, William "Buster" (2019)
- Oakley, Charles (2016 - Basketball)
- Oates, Johnny (2003 - Baseball)

P

- Palumbo, Joe (1973 - Football)
- Parker, Clarence (1972 - Football)
- Parkhill, Barry (2001 - Basketball)
- Peake, Frank (1978 - Football)
- Pearce, Al (2012 - Media)
- Peccatiello, Larry (2010 - Football)
- Penicheiro, Ticha (2014 - Basketball)
- Perdue, Charles (1993 - Football)
- Phillippe, Charles (1982 - Baseball)
- Pitt, Malcom (1974 - Baseball)
- Plummer, Louis (1994 - Track)
- Poindexter, Anthony (2022 - Football)
- Porterfield, Bob (2005 - Baseball)
- Potts, Russ (2004 - Contributor)
- Pratt Jr., Robert (2013 - Football)
- Preas, George (1982 - Football)
- Precourt, Kelly (2008 - Field Hockey)
- Price, William (2001 - Track)
- Price, William (2001 - Football)
- Pritchard, Abisha (1997 - Football)
- Proctor, George (1974 - Basketball)

R

- Rader, Bruce (2020)
- Ragazzo, Vito (1993 - Football)
- Ramsey, Garrard (1974 - Football)
- Randle, Ulmo (1991 - Football)
- Raschi, Victor (1976 - Baseball)
- Ratcliffe, Jerry (2023 - Media)
- Rathbun, Bob (2008 - Media)
- Reyna, Claudio (2017 - Soccer)
- Rice, Paul (1988 - Basketball)
- Ripley, Melissa (1989 - Swimming)
- Rixey Jr., Eppa (1972 - Baseball)
- Roach, Melvin (1988 - Baseball)
- Robbins, Dave (2010 - Basketball)
- Roberts Sr., Glenn (1980 - Basketball)
- Rosenfield, Dave (2016 - Baseball)
- Ross, Bobby (1997 - Football)
- Rotanz, Bob (2023 - Lacrosse)
- Roth, Bill (2013 - Media)
- Rouse, Jeff (2011 - Swimming)
- Rowland, Robert (1978 - Speed Boat Racing)
- Rudd, Ricky (2007 - Auto Racing)
- Rutledge, Warren (2001 - Basketball)
- Ryan, Debbie (2012 - Basketball)

S

- Sampson, Ralph (1996 - Basketball)
- Sanford, Taylor (1977 - Contributor)
- Saunders, Tracy (2020)
- Sawyer, Paul (2002 - Auto Racing)
- Schultz, Megan Silva (2018)
- Scott, Herb (2006 - Football)
- Scott, Thomas (1989 - Football)
- Scott Jr., Thomas (1977 - Lacrosse)
- Scott Jr., Thomas (1977 - Football)
- Scott, Wendell (2000 - Auto Racing)
- Shea, Dick (1987 - Track)
- Shellenberger, William (1998 - Soccer)
- Shirley, J. (1985 - Basketball)
- Shu, Paul (1983 - Football)
- Simons, Gray (1992 - Wrestling)
- Sinclair, Dr. Caroline (1996 - Contributor)
- Slack, Ida (1992 - Bowling)
- Smith, Barty (1999 - Football)
- Smith, Bruce (2005 - Football)
- Smith, C. (1987 - Tennis)
- Smith, Dave (2024 - Administration)
- Smith, Joe (2025 - Basketball)
- Smith, Mike (2025 - Basketball)
- Smith, Richard (1976 - Contributor)
- Snead, J.C. (2003 - Golf)
- Snead, Norman (1984 - Football)
- Snead, Sam (1973 - Golf)
- Soden, Frank (1998 - Media)
- Spangler, Robert (1979 - Football)
- Spencer, Wynsol (1991 - Golf)
- Spessard, Robert (1972 - Basketball)
- Spivey, Hope (2004 - Gymnastics)
- Stanley, Marianne (2016 - Basketball)
- Staley, Dawn (2008 - Basketball)
- Stephens, Hugh (1994 - Baseball)
- Stephenson, Dwight (1999 - Football)
- Stevens, Mike (2015 - Media)
- Stith, Bryant (2007 - Basketball)
- Stobbs, Charles (2002 - Baseball)
- Strange, Curtis (2004 - Golf)
- Strange Jr., Thomas (1998 - Golf)
- Stukes, Charlie (2016 - Football)
- Summers, Francis (1975 - Contributor)
- Sumner, Charlie (2007 - Football)

T

- Tarrant, Dick (2013 - Basketball)
- Taylor, Lawrence (2003 - Football)
- Teel, David (2014 - Media)
- Thalman, Bob (2003 - Football)
- Thomas, Charles (1993 - Baseball)
- Thomas, William (1985 - Football)
- Thompson, Eugene (2011 - Media)
- Thompson, Thomas (1975 - Football)
- Thrift Jr., Sydnor (1998 - Baseball)
- Tipton, Eric (1978 - Football)
- Todd, Dr. John (1978 - Football)
- Toliver, Kristi (2026, Basketball)
- Toon, Al (2020)
- Trice-Myers, Sheila (2023 - Track & Field)
- Turner, Curtis (1999 - Auto Racing)
- Twardzik, Dave (1995 - Basketball)
- Twombly, Edwin (1991 - Baseball)
- Twombly, Edwin (1991 - Contributor)

U

- Ukrop, Bobby (2026 - Basketball)
- Urkrop, Rob (2016 - Soccer)
- Unger, Robbye (1997 - Golf)

V

- Vail, Charles (1985 - Sailboat racing)
- VanDyck, Gracie (2002 - Basketball)
- Vaughan Jr., Porter (1993 - Baseball)
- Vick, Michael (2026 - Football)

W

- Wacker, Lou (2014 - Football)
- Wade, Jesse (1994 - Football)
- Wadkins, Lanny (1996 - Golf)
- Wagner, Billy (2012 - Baseball)
- Walker, Wally (2026 - Basketball)
- Wallace, Ben (2015 - Basketball)
- Warren, Chris (2022 - Football)
- Weatherly, Joseph (1976 - Auto Racing)
- Webb Jr., Paul (1993 - Basketball)
- Welsh, George (2009 - Football)
- Werner, Helmut (2010 - Soccer)
- West, Mark (2006 - Basketball)
- Whitaker, Lou (2025 - Baseball)
- Whitaker, Pernell (2011 - Boxing)
- White, Debbie (2019)
- Wilburn, J.R. (2004 - Football)
- Wilkinson, Richard (1975 - Basketball)
- Willard, Kenneth (1985 - Football)
- Williams, Charles (1981 - Contributor)
- Williams, Leigh (1974 - Basketball)
- Williams, Leigh (1974 - Track)
- Williams, Marcellus "Boo" (2026 - Basketball)
- Wilson, Lawrence (1986 - Baseball)
- Woollum, C.J. (2017 - Administration)
- Wood, Glen (2006 - Auto Racing)
- Wood, Leonard (2006 - Auto Racing)
- Woody, Paul (2024 - Media)
- Worsham, Lewis (1986 - Golf)
- Wright, David (2020)
- Wright, Monica (2024 - Basketball)

Y

- Yeager, Tom (2019)
- Young, Harry (1972 - Basketball)
- Younger, William (1977 - Football)

Z

- Zimmerman, Ryan (2023 - Baseball)
