= Dick Humbert =

American football player (1918–2007)

No. 81
- Positions: End, defensive end

Personal information
- Born: December 31, 1918; Reading, Pennsylvania, U.S.
- Died: May 23, 2007 (aged 88); Richmond, Virginia, U.S.
- Listed height: 6 ft 2 in (1.88 m)
- Listed weight: 178 lb (81 kg)

Career information
- College: Richmond

Career history
- Philadelphia Eagles (1941, 1945–1949)

Awards and highlights
- 2× NFL champion (1948, 1949); Pro Bowl (1941)

Career statistics
- Receptions: 68
- Receiving yards: 731
- Touchdowns: 6

Richard Elmer Humbert (December 31, 1918 – May 23, 2007) was an American football player. He played professionally as an end and defensive end in the National Football League (NFL) for the Philadelphia Eagles in 1941 and again from 1945 to 1949. Humbert played college football as the University of Richmond. He was inducted into the Virginia Sports Hall of Fame in 1981.
