= Dick Shiner =

American football player (born 1942)

No. 14, 18, 17, 11
- Position: Quarterback

Personal information
- Born: July 18, 1942 (age 84); Lebanon, Pennsylvania, U.S.
- Listed height: 6 ft 0 in (1.83 m)
- Listed weight: 197 lb (89 kg)

Career information
- High school: Lebanon
- College: Maryland
- NFL draft: 1964: 7th round, 87th overall pick
- AFL draft: 1964: 20th round, 155th overall pick

Career history
- Washington Redskins (1964–1966); Cleveland Browns (1967); Pittsburgh Steelers (1968–1969); New York Giants (1970); Atlanta Falcons (1971–1973); New England Patriots (1973–1974)

Awards and highlights
- First-team All-ACC (1962); Second-team All-ACC (1963)

Career NFL statistics
- Passing attempts: 736
- Passing completions: 354
- Completion percentage: 48.1%
- TD–INT: 36–43
- Passing yards: 4,801
- Passer rating: 61.3
- Rushing yards: 161
- Rushing touchdowns: 2
- Stats at Pro Football Reference

Richard Earl Shiner (born July 18, 1942) is an American former professional football player who was a quarterback for 11 seasons in the National Football League (NFL) from 1964 to 1974 for the Washington Redskins, Cleveland Browns, Pittsburgh Steelers, New York Giants, Atlanta Falcons, and New England Patriots. He played college football for the Maryland Terrapins.

== College career ==
He played college football at the University of Maryland, College Park. In his first collegiate start, Shiner led the Terrapins to the school's first victory against Penn State in the 37-game series.

== Professional football ==
Shiner was selected in the seventh round of the 1964 NFL draft by the Washington Redskins. Shiner was also selected in the 20th round of the 1964 AFL draft by the New York Jets.

Shiner played sparingly in his first four seasons in the NFL. From 1964 to 1966 with the Redskins, he backed up future Hall of Fame quarterback Sonny Jurgensen and started only one game, in 1965. Moving to the Cleveland Browns for 1967, Shiner was a backup to former All-Pro Frank Ryan, and again saw few chances to play, starting no games and attempting only nine passes all season.

Shiner's big break came on May 14, 1968, when the Browns traded Shiner, a draft choice to be named later and defensive tackle Frank Parker to the Pittsburgh Steelers for another quarterback, Bill Nelsen, and safety Jim Bradshaw, with both quarterbacks getting more playing chances with their new teams. Shiner took over as the starting quarterback for the Steelers in week 4 from Kent Nix, in a game in Cleveland against the Browns, facing Nelsen. Shiner started the rest of the season. He went on to start nine games for the 1969 Steelers (the first season in which Chuck Noll served as Steelers head coach), including their Opening Day win over the Detroit Lions. That first win was the only one of the season, with the Steelers going 1–13 on the year, with a defense that gave up the most points in the NFL—an average of nearly 29 points per game. Fittingly, the final play of the 1969 season saw Shiner sacked by the New Orleans Saints' Doug Atkins on the final play of Atkins' Hall of Fame career.

After Pittsburgh took future Hall of Fame quarterback Terry Bradshaw with the first pick of the 1970 draft, Shiner was traded to the New York Giants in April, 1970 for running back John "Frenchy" Fuqua and linebacker Henry Davis. and backed up yet another Hall of Fame quarterback, Fran Tarkenton . After one season with the Giants, he moved on to the Atlanta Falcons.

On September 16, 1973, while playing for the Falcons in a game against the New Orleans Saints, Shiner became the first person to post a perfect passer rating, during what was the first season in which the statistic was officially kept. However, multiple other quarterbacks are recognized retroactively to have accomplished this feat prior to the 1973 season. Shiner completed 13 of 15 pass attempts for 227 yards and 3 touchdowns, with no interceptions in a 62-7 destruction of Atlanta's archrival. The next week in being shut out against the Rams, Shiner would go on to post a lowest possible 0.0 QB rating (unofficially, as he only attempted nine passes). He ended up in New England midway through the season where once again, Shiner's role was to be the backup to a prominent quarterback—this time Jim Plunkett. He appeared in one game completing two of four passes as the Patriots blew out Houston 32-0 in week 11.

Shiner's career came to a close with one game for the 1974 New England Patriots. He was sent into his only appearance in the 1974 regular season with the Patriots holding a 35–3 lead against the Baltimore Colts. After leading the Patriots on an 80-yard touchdown drive, Shiner took himself out of the game to give third-string quarterback Neil Graff a chance to play in Graff's first NFL regular-season contest. In an interview four decades later, Shiner said, "I wanted Neil Graff to get experience. Neil was a good kid, and I knew my time in the NFL was coming to an end."

== Post NFL ==
After retiring from the NFL, Shiner worked in the beer distribution and copier businesses. After retiring, he has been the backfield coach for the football team at Bishop McDevitt High School in Harrisburg, Pennsylvania and has also been an assistant coach at Hershey High School in Hershey, Pennsylvania. In 2007, Shiner was named a member of the Atlantic Coast Conference Football Legends Class. He also is a member of the Pennsylvania State Athletic Hall of Fame, Maryland M Club Hall of Fame, and Lebanon (PA) High School Hall of Fame.
