= Bill Brill =

American journalist

- Born: June 21, 1931; Philadelphia, Pennsylvania, U.S.
- Died: April 10, 2011 (aged 79); Durham, North Carolina, U.S.
- Occupation: Sports columnist

William Brill (June 21, 1931 – April 10, 2011) was an American sportswriter and author.

== About ==
Brill was born in Philadelphia, Pennsylvania and attended Christchurch School in Middlesex County, Virginia. He attended Duke University before beginning his sports writing career with the Covington Virginian in 1952. He joined The Roanoke Times in 1956, and was named sports editor in 1960, before retiring in 1991.

Brill had something of a "love-hate" relationship with his readers, who generally recognized him as a talented writer and reporter, but often felt he favored universities in North Carolina over Virginia and Virginia Tech, and The Roanoke Times promoted its college football prediction contest as an opportunity to "beat Brill."

When Virginia Tech was invited to join the ACC in 2004, the retired Brill predicted that the Hokies would not win an ACC championship during his lifetime. However, they won twelve, with the Virginia Tech football team winning the ACC championship in their first season in the conference, prompting calls and letters to Brill from Virginia Tech fans asking when his funeral was being held.

Brill wrote a sports column for the Durham Herald-Sun from August 1992 through April 1994. He served as president of the Atlantic Coast Sportswriters and Sportscasters Association (ACSWA) from 1982 to 1984, and president of the National Association of Sportscasters and Sportswriters from 1993 to 1995. He was named the Virginia Sportswriter of the Year in 1991. Brill was the 1995 recipient of the Jake Wade Award for lifetime contributions to college athletics from College Sports Information Directors. He covered a total of 35 Final Fours, more than any other sports writer.

The USBWA president in 1980–81, Brill began his career with the Roanoke Times and World News in 1956, and served as the paper's executive sports editor and columnist through 1991.

After retirement, he settled in Durham, North Carolina, remaining a regular contributor to several publications until his death at age 79, due to esophageal cancer, on April 10, 2011. Duke men's basketball coach Mike Krzyzewski visited him at Duke Med the morning of April 10.

Brill was inducted into the Virginia Sports Hall of Fame in 1999.

== Bibliography ==
- 1986 – Duke Basketball, 1906–1986, an Illustrated History. Taylor Pub. Co., ASIN: B000NP1GH8.
- 1993 – A Season is a Lifetime: The Inside Story of the Duke Blue Devils and Their Championship Seasons, Simon & Schuster, 270 pages, ISBN 978-0-671-79811-6.

== Awards ==
- 1967 Virginia Distinguished Service to Sports Award
- 1991 Virginia Sports Information Directors Distinguished Service Award
- 1991 Virginia Sportswriter of the Year
- 1995 College Sports Information Directors Lifetime Achievement Award
- 1996 Duke Sports Hall of Fame
- 1998 Marvin “Skeeter” Francis Award for special contributions to [[Atlantic Coast Conference|Atlantic Coast Conference]]
- 1999 Virginia Sports Hall of Fame inductee
