= John Foruria =

American football player (1944–2017)

No. 9, 24
- Position: Defensive back

Personal information
- Born: November 26, 1944; Emmett, Idaho, U.S.
- Died: May 3, 2017 (aged 72); Emmett, Idaho, U.S.
- Listed height: 6 ft 2 in (1.88 m)
- Listed weight: 205 lb (93 kg)

Career information
- High school: Emmett (ID)
- College: Idaho (1963-1966)
- NFL draft: 1967: 8th round, 192nd overall pick

Career history
- Wheeling Ironmen (1967); Pittsburgh Steelers (1967–1968); Spokane Shockers (1969)

Career NFL statistics
- Fumble recoveries: 1
- Stats at Pro Football Reference

John Foruria (November 26, 1944 – May 3, 2017) was an American professional football defensive back. He played for the Pittsburgh Steelers from 1967 to 1968, and college football at the University of Idaho as a quarterback.

Later a fruit broker for decades in his hometown of Emmett, Idaho, Foruria died there in 2017 at age 72.
