= Booth Lusteg =

American football player (1939–2012)

Profile
- Position: Placekicker

Personal information
- Born: December 18, 1938; New Haven, Connecticut
- Died: July 12, 2012 (aged 73); Plantation, Florida
- Listed height: 5 ft 11 in (1.80 m)
- Listed weight: 190 lb (86 kg)

Career information
- College: Connecticut

Career history
- New Bedford Sweepers (ACFL) (1965); Buffalo Bills (1966); Miami Dolphins (1967); Pittsburgh Steelers (1968); Green Bay Packers (1969); Tampa Bay Buccaneers (1976)*
- * Offseason or practice squad member only
- Stats at Pro Football Reference

Gerald Booth Lusteg (May 8, 1939 – July 12, 2012) was a placekicker in the American Football League and the National Football League who played for the Buffalo Bills, Miami Dolphins, Pittsburgh Steelers and the Green Bay Packers. Lusteg played football professionally for four seasons. He retired in 1969.

== Professional football career ==
=== Buffalo Bills ===
Lusteg, who at the time was doing acting, first played football for the New Bedford Sweepers of the Atlantic Coast Football League. After the Bills lost kicker Pete Gogolak, Lusteg was one of nearly 100 people who applied to replace him. Lusteg was one of the only players with kicking experience out of the group: his top two competitors were a German bricklayer and a man with one arm and one eye.

At the time of the tryout, Lusteg took on the identity of his younger brother Wallace, who had graduated from Boston College, to shave four years off his perceived age in the hopes of improving his chances of making the team. The team's first preseason game that year was against the Boston Patriots and played at Boston College. The local newspapers ran stories about Lusteg prior to the game since the information they received from the Bills stated he was from Boston College. Lusteg kicked four field goals to help the Bills win the game, which led some of the same newspapers to post stories critical of the Patriots for letting a local star be signed by another team. Lusteg's true identity, however, was discovered shortly thereafter, but he played just as well in the team's second preseason game against Denver; so the Bills decided to sign him as the team's kicker. The Sweepers, however, still claimed that they had Lusteg under contract and sued the Bills for $50,000. The teams negotiated a settlement and Lusteg joined the Bills.

During the 1966 regular season, Lusteg made 19 of 38 field goal attempts and 41 of 42 extra point attempts to lead all of the league's kickers in scoring with 98 points. On October 16, 1966, Lusteg was confronted and harassed by some angry Bills fans while he was on his way home from the game after missing a potential game-winning field goal in a game against the San Diego Chargers, a game that eventually ended in a 17–17 tie. The Bills won their division, but lost in the championship game to the Kansas City Chiefs. Lusteg was released by the Bills in 1967.

=== Miami Dolphins ===
Lusteg was signed by the Dolphins in November 1967. He appeared in eight games, made 7 out 12 field goal attempts and was 18 for 18 in extra point attempts to lead the team in scoring with 39 points. He was cut by the Dolphins in August 1968.

=== Pittsburgh Steelers ===
Lusteg played in 13 games for the Steelers in 1968. He finished the season 8 for 20 in field goal attempts and 26 for 29 in extra point attempts for a total of 60 points. He became a favorite among some Steelers' fans because of his routine of kicking paper cups on the sidelines behind the team's bench to practice his technique and warm up before entering the game to kick.

=== Green Bay Packers ===
Lusteg was signed by the Packers as a late-season replacement for Mike Mercer in November 1969 and played four games for the team. He was 1 for 5 in field goal attempts and 12 for 12 in extra point attempts for a total of 15 points. Lusteg was released by the Packers the following season after team decided to go with Dale Livingston instead.

=== Tampa Bay Buccaneers ===
Lusteg had been retired for seven years when the expansion-team Buccaneers signed him to a pre-season contract four days prior to the team's first exhibition game in Los Angeles against the Rams. The team had only one kicker in training camp and brought Lusteg in to provide competition. Although he traveled with the team to Los Angeles, he did not play in the game and was cut after only seven days.

=== Portland Storm ===
Lusteg was signed by the Portland Storm of the World Football League (WFL) in 1974.

== Post career honors ==
Lusteg was inducted into the Branford Sports Hall of Fame in 2004.

== Death ==
Lusteg died of lung cancer on July 12, 2012.
