= Fran O'Brien (American football) =

American football player (1936–1999)

- O'Brien in 1959

No. 70, 61, 72
- Position: Offensive tackle

Personal information
- Born: April 17, 1936; Springfield, Massachusetts, U.S.
- Died: October 21, 1999 (aged 63); Washington, D.C., U.S.
- Listed height: 6 ft 1 in (1.85 m)
- Listed weight: 253 lb (115 kg)

Career information
- High school: Holyoke (MA)
- College: Michigan State
- NFL draft: 1959: 3rd round, 35th overall pick

Career history
- Cleveland Browns (1959); Washington Redskins (1960–1966); Pittsburgh Steelers (1966–1968)

Career NFL statistics
- Games played: 142
- Games started: 95
- Fumble recoveries: 4
- Stats at Pro Football Reference

Francis Joseph O'Brien (April 17, 1936 – October 21, 1999) was an American professional football offensive lineman in the National Football League (NFL) who played for the Cleveland Browns (1959), the Washington Redskins (1960 to 1966), and the Pittsburgh Steelers (1966 to 1968). He played college football at Michigan State University.

== Early life ==
O'Brien was born in Springfield, Massachusetts and raised in Holyoke, Massachusetts, where attended Holyoke High School.

== College career ==
O'Brien attended and played college football at Michigan State University.

== Professional career ==
O'Brien was selected in the third round of the 1959 NFL draft by the Cleveland Browns, who made him the 35th pick overall.

After playing for the Browns for the 1959 season in a reserve role, he was traded along with kicker Bob Khayat to the Washington Redskins for kicker Sam Baker, a former NFL scoring leader.

O'Brien played for Washington from 1960 to 1966. During the 1960 and 1961 seasons he started at left guard for the Redskins, before being moved to the starting right tackle spot in 1963.

Shortly after the start of the 1966 season, O'Brien's contract was sold by the Redskins to the Pittsburgh Steelers. He would play in Pittsburgh as a reserve tackle in 1966 before earning a starting role in 1967. This 1967 season would be cut short after only four games, however, when he suffered a fractured ankle in a Saturday afternoon contest against the team that drafted him, the Cleveland Browns.

The 1968 season would be O'Brien's final year in the league, during which he would assume his customary role as the team's starting right tackle. Although he missed time in two games due to an early season viral infection, O'Brien managed to start 12 and see action in all 14 games for Pittsburgh during his final year.

Already moving his attention to the restaurant business during his playing days, O'Brien decided to call it a career at age 32 and retired prior to Steelers training camp for the 1969 season.

== Life after football ==
After retiring from football, O'Brien owned and operated restaurants in Washington, D. C., Annapolis, Maryland, and Rehoboth Beach, Delaware. His first restaurant, opened on Wisconsin Avenue in Washington, was called "The Goal Post" and gained popularity with politicians and lobbyists. His later venture in Annapolis, "Fran O'Brien's Steak and Seafood House," gained a similar popularity.

O'Brien married his wife, the former Elizabeth Kemp, in 1965. The couple had two children.

== Death and legacy ==
Fran O'Brien was a resident of Vienna, Virginia during his final years. He died on October 21, 1999, of a heart attack at George Washington University Hospital in Washington, D. C. He was 63 years old at the time of his death.
