= Kent Nix =

American football player (born 1944)

No. 10, 16, 14
- Position: Quarterback

Personal information
- Born: March 12, 1944 (age 82); Corpus Christi, Texas, U.S.
- Listed height: 6 ft 2 in (1.88 m)
- Listed weight: 195 lb (88 kg)

Career information
- High school: W. B. Ray (Corpus Christi)
- College: TCU
- NFL draft: 1966: undrafted

Career history
- Green Bay Packers (1966)*; Pittsburgh Steelers (1967–1969); Chicago Bears (1970–1971); Houston Oilers (1972)
- * Offseason or practice squad member only

Awards and highlights
- Super Bowl champion (I)

Career NFL statistics
- Passing attempts: 652
- Passing completions: 301
- Completion percentage: 46.2%
- TD–INT: 23–49
- Passing yards: 3,644
- Passer rating: 44.3
- Stats at Pro Football Reference

Alvin Kent Nix (born March 12, 1944) is an American former professional football player who was a quarterback in the National Football League (NFL). He played college football for the TCU Horned Frogs. Nix is the son of Emery Nix, who played for the New York Giants in 1943 and 1946.

== College career ==
Nix helped TCU to an upset of Baylor University in October 1964. He passed 4 yards to Joe Ball for the first score in a 17–14 win at Fort Worth, Texas. He led the Horned Frogs on four long scoring drives as a senior quarterback to defeat Baylor in Waco, Texas, the following October. Nix hit on five consecutive passes during a 79-yard drive for a touchdown, in the second quarter. TCU won on a field goal by Bruce Alford in the third period. Nix tied a Southwest Conference record with 4 touchdown passes of 31, 24, 12, and 15 yards, versus Rice University, in November 1965. He also scored on a one-yard plunge to give Texas Christian a 42-14 halftime lead. His first two touchdown passes came in the first ninety-three seconds following Rice fumbles. Nix was bothered for much of his collegiate career by a knee injury. While at TCU, he was a member of Delta Tau Delta fraternity.

== Professional career ==
=== Green Bay Packers ===
Nix was cut by the Green Bay Packers on August 2, 1966. He passed through waivers but was retained on the Packers' taxi squad for the remainder of the 1966 season. After clearing waivers Nix became a free agent. Nix was back in the Packers' training camp in 1967, but trailed three other quarterbacks on the depth chart: Bart Starr, Zeke Bratkowski and Don Horn. On July 30, 1967, the Packers traded Nix to the Pittsburgh Steelers, in exchange for the Steelers' fifth round draft pick in 1968. This wound up being the 9th pick in the 5th round, and the Packers used it in the 1968 draft to select offensive lineman Steve Duich.

=== Pittsburgh Steelers ===
Nix got his first chance to play in the NFL with the Pittsburgh Steelers in September 1967. The Steelers' regular quarterback, Bill Nelsen, had an injury to his right knee. Nix was the only other quarterback on the roster. He made his debut against the Philadelphia Eagles. Nix connected on an 18-yard pass to J.R. Wilburn to tie the score, 24–24, midway through the fourth quarter. The Steelers lost in Philadelphia, Pennsylvania, 34–24. Nix completed 23 of 34 passes against the Cleveland Browns for 218 yards and one touchdown, in October 1967. Split end Dick Compton caught ten of his passes. Nix hit rookie Steelers' running back, Don Shy, for a 27-yard touchdown in a loss to the Giants at Pittsburgh, on October 15.

Tom Landry called Nix the best rookie quarterback he had seen in ten years. Nix guided the Steelers to a 24–14 triumph against the Detroit Lions on December 3. He handed off to Shy for two one-yard touchdowns to cap drives of 80 and 64 yards in the first and second quarters. He fooled the Lions' defense by passing often on first and second down. Most significantly Nix found swift J.R. Wilburn for a 67-yard touchdown with 1:49 remaining in the second quarter. He led the Steelers on a 78-yard drive, completed by a Nix to John Hilton 3-yard touchdown pass, which gave Pittsburgh a temporary 10–9 lead against the Washington Redskins. During the drive at Pittsburgh on December 10, Wilburn caught four passes for fifty-five yards.

Upon the team drafting future Hall of Fame quarterback Terry Bradshaw first overall in the 1970 NFL draft, the Steelers traded Nix during the 1970 preseason to the Minnesota Vikings, but he failed to make their roster and signed with the Bears before the season started.

=== Chicago Bears ===
Nix signed with the Chicago Bears and spent the 1970 season on the taxi squad. He rallied the Bears in the fourth quarter for a second straight week, coming from behind to upset the Vikings, 20–17, in September 1971. He threw touchdown passes of 36 and 26 yards to Dick Gordon at Metropolitan Stadium in Bloomington, MN The latter pass found Gordon in the end zone with 1:42 remaining in the game. Bears starting quarterback, Jack Concannon, was knocked out of the game on a hit by Carl Eller.

Nix started his first game since 1968 in a 35–14 beating of the New Orleans Saints at Soldier Field. He threw touchdown passes of 25 and 35 yards to Bob Wallace and Gordon. Overall, he completed 14 of 24 passes for 242 yards.

The Bears, who fired coach Jim Dooley after the 1971 season and replaced him with Abe Gibron, waived Nix on September 13, 1972, four days before the start of the regular season. In March 1974 Nix filed suit against the Bears, charging they had misdiagnosed a November 1971 hand injury as a sprained wrist. He asked for more than $10,000. Nix had continued playing following the preliminary diagnosis. In his lawsuit he claimed that the injury was aggravated. A later diagnosis stated that the injury was a rupture of both tendons of the index finger of the right hand.

=== Houston Oilers ===
The Houston Oilers signed him to their taxi squad on September 21. Nix appeared in 12 games for the Oilers, two of them starts. Houston traded Nix along with Ron Billingsley to the New Orleans Saints for Dave Parks, Tom Stincic, and Edd Hargett in March 1973.

=== New Orleans Saints ===
Nix found himself in a four-way competition for three quarterback slots with the Saints, vying for a job with Archie Manning, second year quarterback Bobby Scott, and former Jets and Oilers backup quarterback Bob Davis. The Saints' 1973 pre-season media guide listed Nix third on the quarterback depth chart, behind Manning and Scott but ahead of Davis. The other three quarterbacks all appeared for the Saints in the 1973 regular season, but Nix never did.

== Personal life ==
Nix returned to TCU to finish his business degree, and went into business with his wife Susan, who also attended TCU. She was named "Miss TCU" during her senior year. They went on to own a dry cleaning business, which they later sold, and then went into the florist business. Now retired, he serves on the Colonial County Club Board of Directors, and continues to follow TCU football closely. Susan Nix died in November 2020 from COVID-19 related complications.
