= Jim Elliott (American football) =

American football player (born 1943)

No. 6
- Position: Punter

Personal information
- Born: August 18, 1944 (age 82); Montgomery, Alabama, U.S.
- Listed height: 5 ft 11 in (1.80 m)
- Listed weight: 184 lb (83 kg)

Career information
- High school: Herschel V. Jenkins (GA)
- College: Presbyterian

Career history
- Pittsburgh Steelers (1967)
- Stats at Pro Football Reference

James Laurence Elliott (born August 18, 1944) is an American former professional football player who played for Pittsburgh Steelers of the National Football League (NFL). He played college football at Presbyterian College.
