= Chet Anderson =

American football player (1945–2007)

No. 46, 83
- Position: Tight end

Personal information
- Born: March 14, 1945; Grand Rapids, Minnesota, U.S.
- Died: March 14, 2007 (aged 62); Duluth, Minnesota, U.S.
- Listed height: 6 ft 3 in (1.91 m)
- Listed weight: 245 lb (111 kg)

Career information
- High school: Central (Duluth, Minnesota)
- College: Minnesota (1963–1966)
- NFL draft: 1967: 14th round, 350th overall pick

Career history
- Pittsburgh Steelers (1967–1968); Bridgeport Jets (1970)

Career NFL statistics
- Receptions: 8
- Receiving yards: 141
- Receiving touchdowns: 2
- Stats at Pro Football Reference

Chester Leonard Anderson Jr. (March 14, 1945 – March 14, 2007) was an American professional football tight end in the National Football League (NFL). He played college football for the Minnesota Golden Gophers.
