= Bobby Morgan (Canadian football) =

American gridiron football player (born 1940)

Bob Morgan
Profile
- Position: Running back

Personal information
- Born: August 7, 1940 (age 86); Wamego, Kansas, U.S.
- Listed height: 6 ft 0 in (1.83 m)
- Listed weight: 205 lb (93 kg)

Career information
- High school: Wamego (KS)
- College: New Mexico

Career history
- 1965–66: Toronto Rifles
- 1967: Pittsburgh Steelers
- 1969: Toronto Argonauts
- 1969: Ottawa Rough Riders

Awards and highlights
- Grey Cup champion (1969)
- Stats at Pro Football Reference

Robert Bernard Morgan (born August 7, 1940) is an American former professional football running back. He graduated from University of New Mexico and played in the Continental Football League with the Toronto Rifles from 1965–67 and five games with the Pittsburgh Steelers of the National Football League in 1967.

He joined the Toronto Argonauts for seven games in the 1969 season and after his release played for the Chicago Owls of the Continental league before returning to the CFL with the Ottawa Rough Riders in October 1969 for a game.
