= Mike Connelly =

American football player (1935–2021)

No. 54, 53, 52
- Positions: Center, guard, tackle

Personal information
- Born: October 16, 1935; Monrovia, California, U.S.
- Died: October 4, 2021 (aged 85); Texas, U.S.
- Listed height: 6 ft 4 in (1.93 m)
- Listed weight: 247 lb (112 kg)

Career information
- High school: Pasadena (Pasadena, California)
- College: Washington State (1953); Utah State (1958-1959)
- NFL draft: 1959: 12th round, 141st overall pick
- AFL draft: 1960: 1st round

Career history
- Los Angeles Rams (1959); Dallas Cowboys (1960–1967); Pittsburgh Steelers (1968)

Awards and highlights
- 2× All-Skyline (1958, 1959)

Career NFL statistics
- Games played: 120
- Games started: 71
- Fumble recoveries: 6
- Stats at Pro Football Reference

Michael James Connelly (October 16, 1935 – October 4, 2021) was an American professional football player who was an offensive lineman in the National Football League (NFL) for the Dallas Cowboys and Pittsburgh Steelers. He played college football at Utah State University and was drafted in the 12th round of the 1959 NFL draft by the Los Angeles Rams.

== Early life ==
Connelly attended Pasadena High School, where he practiced football and baseball. He accepted a scholarship from Washington State University, playing freshman football. He then transferred to Pasadena City College for one season.

He later signed for a 2-year stint with the United States Marine Corps, before moving on to play football at Utah State University from 1958 to 1959, where he was a two-way player, center/guard on offense and linebacker on defense. He garnered All-Skyline conference honors as a senior.

== Professional career ==
=== Los Angeles Rams ===
Connelly was selected by the Los Angeles Rams in the 12th round (141st overall) of the 1959 NFL draft, with a future draft pick, which allowed the team to draft him before his college eligibility was over. He was also selected by the Buffalo Bills in the 1960 AFL draft. He was released by the Rams at the end of the 1960 preseason.

=== Dallas Cowboys ===
On September 9, 1960, he was claimed off waivers by the Dallas Cowboys. He started as a backup guard, before being switched over to center in 1961, becoming the starter there for four straight years. Connelly was very quick for his position and as an avid weightlifter, becoming one of the strongest players on the team.

In 1965 after Dave Manders won the starting position, he started to serve as a backup center and guard. An injury to Manders put Connelly back in the starting lineup during all of the 1967 season, which included the championship game against the Green Bay Packers, popularly known as the Ice Bowl.

He reported to training camp in 1968 and told head coach Tom Landry that he'd only play one more year. The next day he was traded to the Pittsburgh Steelers for kicker Mike Clark.

=== Pittsburgh Steelers ===
Connelly true to his word, played only in the 1968 season before retiring.
