= John Campbell (American football) =

American football player (1938–2024)

No. 55, 53
- Position: Linebacker

Personal information
- Born: October 7, 1938; Wadena, Minnesota, U.S.
- Died: October 21, 2024 (aged 86); Burnsville, Minnesota, U.S.
- Listed height: 6 ft 3 in (1.91 m)
- Listed weight: 225 lb (102 kg)

Career information
- High school: Wadena (MN)
- College: Minnesota
- NFL draft: 1963: 11th round, 143rd overall pick
- AFL draft: 1963: 5th round, 40th overall pick

Career history
- Minnesota Vikings (1963–1964); Pittsburgh Steelers (1965–1969); Baltimore Colts (1969)

Awards and highlights
- All-Pro (1966); National champion (1960); First-team All-Big Ten (1962)

Career NFL statistics
- Fumble recoveries: 6
- Interceptions: 5
- Total touchdowns: 1
- Stats at Pro Football Reference

John William Campbell (October 7, 1938 – October 21, 2024) was an American professional football player who was a linebacker in the National Football League (NFL) from 1963 to 1969. He served in the Navy before playing college football for the Minnesota Golden Gophers. Campbell was 6'3" 225lbs when he played in the NFL.

Campbell married Sue (Wilson) Campbell in 1965 and had four adult children and three grandchildren. After his football career, he worked at WCCO TV in Minneapolis and was a stockbroker for several years. He also started his own media packaging company, J.C.A. (John Campbell and Associates). Campbell served as a Christian motivational speaker and presented the 'Man In The Mirror' seminar series to Christian men's groups worldwide. Campbell was an Associate pastor at Life Church in Bloomington Minnesota. He was also a volunteer chaplain with the Burnsville Minnesota Police Department. Campbell lived in Burnsville, Minnesota, since 1968.

Campbell died in Burnsville, Minnesota, on October 21, 2024, at the age of 86.
