= Mike Clark (placekicker) =

American football player (1940–2002)

No. 84, 83, 17
- Position: Placekicker

Personal information
- Born: November 7, 1940; Marshall, Texas, U.S.
- Died: July 24, 2002 (aged 61); Dallas, Texas, U.S.
- Listed height: 6 ft 1 in (1.85 m)
- Listed weight: 205 lb (93 kg)

Career information
- High school: Longview (Longview, Texas)
- College: Texas A&M
- NFL draft: 1963: undrafted

Career history
- Philadelphia Eagles (1963); Pittsburgh Steelers (1964–1967); Dallas Cowboys (1968–1971); Buffalo Bills (1972); Dallas Cowboys (1973)

Awards and highlights
- Super Bowl champion (VI); Pro Bowl (1966)

Career NFL statistics
- Field goals: 133
- Field goal attempts: 232
- Field goal %: 57.3
- Longest field goal: 50
- Stats at Pro Football Reference

Michael Vincent Clark (November 7, 1940 – July 24, 2002) was an American professional football placekicker in the National Football League (NFL) for the Philadelphia Eagles, Pittsburgh Steelers, Dallas Cowboys and Buffalo Bills. He played college football at Texas A&M University.

== Early life ==
Clark attended Longview High School, where he played as a wide receiver. He accepted a football scholarship from Texas A&M University under head coach Jim Myers.

Clark had never tried kicking a field goal until being on the freshman team. He became the starter after one game, when the player in front of him was injured while trying to break up a wedge on special teams.

== Professional career ==
=== Philadelphia Eagles ===
Clark was signed by the Philadelphia Eagles as an undrafted free agent after the 1963 NFL draft. He was mainly a kickoff specialist. On September 1, 1964, he was sold to the Pittsburgh Steelers.

=== Pittsburgh Steelers ===
In 1964, the Pittsburgh Steelers acquired Clark after deciding to trade Lou Michaels to the Baltimore Colts. In 1966, he registered 97 points and was named to the Pro Bowl after scoring 71 points. He led the team in scoring in each of his four seasons with the Steelers.

On July 16, 1968, Clark announced his retirement. The Dallas Cowboys convinced him to play in his home state and traded center Mike Connelly to the Steelers in exchange for his rights.

=== Dallas Cowboys (first stint) ===
In 1968, Clark replaced the recently retired Danny Villanueva, becoming the first Aggie to play for the Dallas Cowboys. He finished second in the NFL with 105 points scored.

In 1969, Clark was again second in the league, with 103 points, while establishing a franchise record with 20 field goals, although he is mostly remembered for a playoff game against the Cleveland Browns, where he received an offside penalty for whiffing on an onside kick and when he attempted a second try, he received another penalty because the onside kick did not travel the required 10 yards.

In 1970, Clark played a key role in a 6-2 victory in the thirteenth game, against the Cleveland Browns, and a 5-0 victory in the divisional playoff against the Detroit Lions. In 1971, he was passed on the depth chart by Toni Fritsch and sent to the taxi squad for two games, before Fritsch pulled a hamstring and he regained the starting job. Clark also set a franchise record with 99 consecutive extra points made. On September 6, 1972, he was waived after being passed on the depth chart by Fritsch.

=== Buffalo Bills ===
On September 6, 1972, Clark was claimed off waivers by the Buffalo Bills. He suffered a broken arm in the Bills' final preseason game and was placed on the injured reserve list. On August 30, 1973, he was released after not being able to pass John Leypoldt on the depth chart.

=== New England Patriots ===
On September 3, 1973, Clark was claimed off waivers by the New England Patriots. He was cut by the team on September 11.

=== Dallas Cowboys (second stint) ===
On October 26, 1973, Clark signed as a free agent with the Cowboys. He played in four games and retired at the end of the season after not being able to recover from a broken leg.

== Personal life ==
Clark worked for Lockheed Martin. He died of a heart attack at Baylor University Medical Center. He was diagnosed with advanced melanoma in 1998.
