= Marshall Cropper =

American football player (born 1944)

Profile
- Position: Wide receiver

Personal information
- Born: April 1, 1944 (age 82); Wattsville, Virginia, U.S.
- Listed height: 6 ft 4 in (1.93 m)
- Listed weight: 200 lb (91 kg)

Career information
- High school: Mary Nottingham Smith (VA)
- College: Eastern Shore (Maryland)

Career history
- Pittsburgh Steelers (1967–1969)
- Stats at Pro Football Reference

Marshall Joseph Cropper (born April 1, 1944) is an American former professional football player who was a wide receiver for the Pittsburgh Steelers of the National Football League (NFL). He played college football at the University of Maryland Eastern Shore.
