= Willie Asbury =

American football player (born 1943)

No. 30
- Position: Running back

Personal information
- Born: February 22, 1943 (age 83); Crawfordville, Georgia, U.S.
- Listed height: 6 ft 1 in (1.85 m)
- Listed weight: 226 lb (103 kg)

Career information
- High school: Princeton (Sharonville, Ohio)
- College: Kent State (1962–1965)
- NFL draft: 1966: 4th round, 64th overall pick

Career history
- Pittsburgh Steelers (1966–1968)

Awards and highlights
- MAC Offensive Player of the Year (1965)

Career NFL statistics
- Rushing yards: 868
- Rushing average: 3.4
- Rushing touchdowns: 11
- Receptions: 25
- Receiving yards: 307
- Receiving touchdowns: 2
- Stats at Pro Football Reference

William Wesley Asbury (born February 22, 1943) is an American former professional football player who was a running back in the National Football League (NFL) for the Pittsburgh Steelers. He played college football for the Kent State Golden Flashes.
