= Mike Haggerty =

American football player (born 1945)

No. 76, 75, 77, 70, 72
- Position: Offensive tackle

Personal information
- Born: October 14, 1945; Royal Oak, Michigan, U.S.
- Died: November 28, 2002 (aged 57)
- Listed height: 6 ft 4 in (1.93 m)
- Listed weight: 245 lb (111 kg)

Career information
- High school: Shrine Catholic (Royal Oak)
- College: Miami (1963–1966)
- NFL draft: 1967: 6th round, 140th overall pick

Career history
- Pittsburgh Steelers (1967–1970); New England Patriots (1971); Washington Redskins (1973)*; Detroit Lions (1973); Jacksonville Sharks (1974); Toronto Argonauts (1975)*; Jacksonville Express (1975)
- * Offseason or practice squad member only

Career NFL statistics
- Games played: 60
- Games started: 30
- Fumble recoveries: 1
- Stats at Pro Football Reference

Michael Keetel Haggerty (October 14, 1945 – November 28, 2002) was an American professional football offensive tackle who played six seasons in the National Football League (NFL) with the Pittsburgh Steelers, New England Patriots and Detroit Lions. He was selected by the Steelers in the sixth round of the 1967 NFL/AFL draft after playing college football at the University of Miami.

== Early life and college ==
Michael Keetel Haggerty was born on October 14, 1945, in Royal Oak, Michigan. He attended Shrine Catholic High School in Royal Oak.

Haggerty was a member of the Miami Hurricanes of the University of Miami from 1963 to 1966 and a two-year letterman from 1965 to 1966.

== Professional career ==
Haggerty was selected by the Pittsburgh Steelers in the sixth round, with the 140th overall pick, of the 1967 NFL draft. He played in all 14 games, starting 11, for the Steelers during his rookie year in 1967 and recovered one fumble. He appeared in one game in 1968. Haggerty played in all 14 games, starting five, during the 1969 season. He started all 14 games for the Steelers in 1970 as the team finished the year with a 5–9 record.

In July 1971, Haggerty was traded to the New England Patriots for Marty Schottenheimer and an undisclosed 1972 draft pick. Haggerty played in 13 games for the Patriots in 1971. He was released on August 29, 1972.

Haggerty signed with the Washington Redskins on May 2, 1973. He was released on August 6, 1973.

Haggerty was claimed off waivers by the Detroit Lions on August 8, 1973. He was released on September 12, 1973, but soon re-signed. He played in four games for the Lions during the 1973 season. Haggerty was released on September 11, 1974.

Haggerty was then a member of the Jacksonville Sharks of the World Football League (WFL) in 1974.

He signed with the Toronto Argonauts of the Canadian Football League in January 1975. He was suspended by the Argonauts in mid-June 1975 after failing to report to camp.

Haggerty played for the WFL's Jacksonville Express during the 1975 season.

== Personal life ==
Haggerty owned a restaurant called Brendan's Restaurant. He died on November 28, 2002.
