= Bill Nelsen =

American football player (1941–2019)

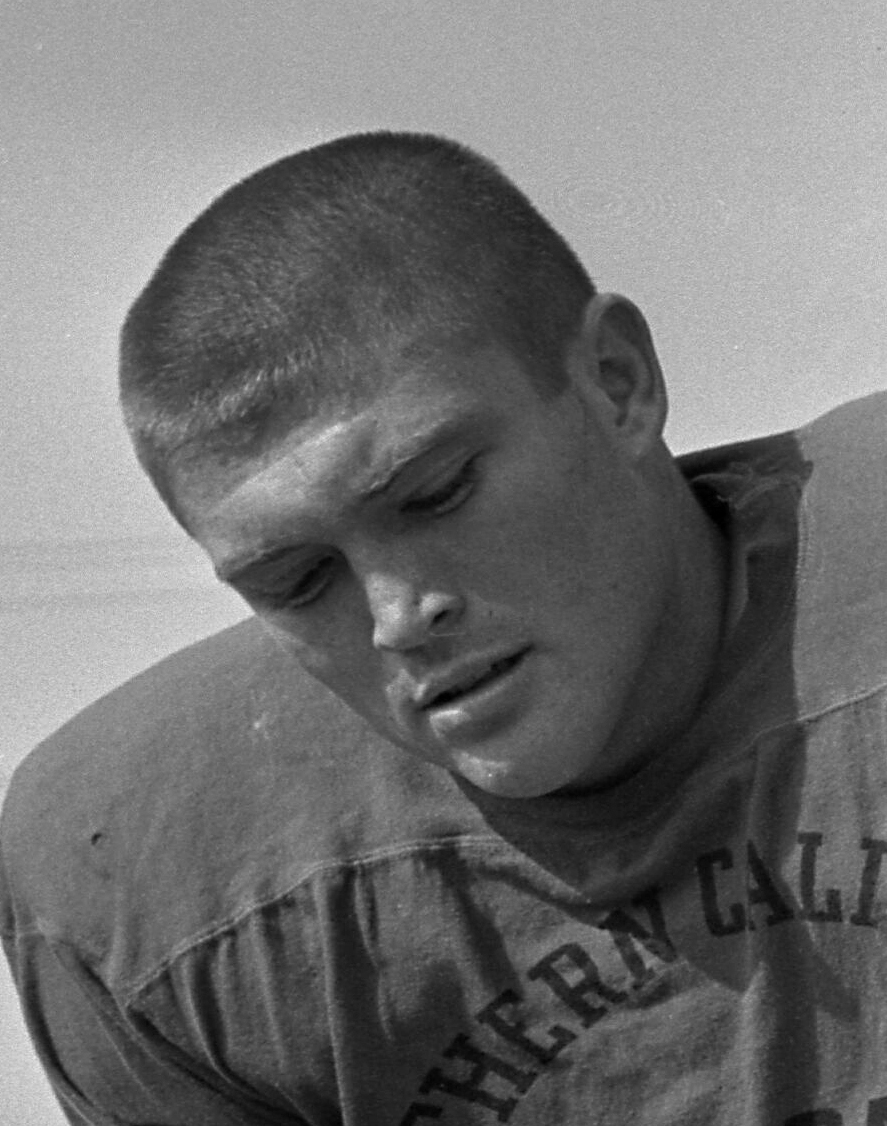
- Nelsen as a USC player

No. 14, 16
- Position: Quarterback

Personal information
- Born: January 29, 1941; Los Angeles, California, U.S.
- Died: April 11, 2019 (aged 78); Orlando, Florida, U.S.
- Listed height: 6 ft 0 in (1.83 m)
- Listed weight: 195 lb (88 kg)

Career information
- High school: El Rancho (Pico Rivera, California)
- College: USC
- NFL draft: 1963: 10th round, 136th overall pick

Career history

Playing
- Pittsburgh Steelers (1963–1967); Cleveland Browns (1968–1972)

Coaching
- New England Patriots (1973–1974) Quarterbacks coach; Atlanta Falcons (1975–1976) Offensive coordinator; Tampa Bay Buccaneers (1977–1982) Quarterbacks coach; Detroit Lions (1984) Offensive coordinator

Awards and highlights
- Second-team All-Pro (1968); Pro Bowl (1969); Cleveland Browns Legends; National champion (1962)

Career NFL statistics
- Passing attempts: 1,905
- Passing completions: 963
- Completion percentage: 50.6%
- TD–INT: 98–101
- Passing yards: 14,165
- Passer rating: 70.2
- Stats at Pro Football Reference
- Coaching profile at Pro Football Reference

William Keith Nelsen (January 29, 1941 – April 11, 2019) was an American professional football player who played as a quarterback in the National Football League (NFL). He played college football for the USC Trojans before playing professionally for both the Pittsburgh Steelers and Cleveland Browns. He was known for his leadership and willingness to play with pain, enduring a series of knee injuries during the course of his career. He later served as an assistant coach with four NFL teams.

== College career ==
After playing one season of community college ball at Cerritos College in California, Nelsen moved on to USC, where he was a key player during his first two seasons, leading the squad in total offense in both 1960 and 1961. In 1962, he split time at the position with Pete Beathard, helping the team capture the national championship.

== Professional career ==
Nelsen was drafted in the 10th round of the 1963 NFL draft by the Steelers, but saw limited action during his first two seasons. In 1965, new head coach Mike Nixon gave Nelsen the starting job. However, the struggling team finished 2–12, offering him little help, with Nelsen throwing for eight touchdowns, in addition to 17 interceptions. In the November 14, 1965, game against the Dallas Cowboys, Nelsen suffered a knee injury that plagued him the remainder of that year; he underwent surgery after the season.

The following season, Nelsen suffered a knee injury against the Detroit Lions in the season's second game. Originally scheduled to be out of the lineup for six weeks, Nelsen did not return until the season's 12th week. The limited time on the field allowed him to set a league record for fewest interceptions (100 minimum passes) with just one on the campaign. In the season finale on December 18, he completed his final 11 passes to defeat the expansion Atlanta Falcons.

In 1967, the injuries continued for Nelsen when during the closing moments of the September 24 game against the St. Louis Cardinals, he was injured following a tackle by Chuck Walker. He missed the next four games, but came off the bench to engineer a 14–10 comeback victory over the expansion New Orleans Saints on October 29.

On May 14, 1968, Nelsen was traded, along with defensive back Jim Bradshaw, to the Browns. In return, the Pittsburgh Steelers received quarterback Dick Shiner, defensive tackle Frank Parker and an undisclosed draft choice. The trade wound up helping both teams, as within a month into the season, both Nelsen and Shiner were starting at quarterback for their new clubs.

After serving as Frank Ryan's backup for three games in 1968, Nelsen was elevated to the starting role, and quickly made his mark with a shocking 30–20 upset of the previously unbeaten Baltimore Colts on October 20. By the end of the season, Nelsen had led the team to the playoffs, winning nine of his 11 starts.

In 1969, Nelsen had another strong season, leading the Browns to a 10–3–1 record and a postseason berth, as well as being selected to his first and only Pro Bowl. One week after throwing for five touchdowns in a 42–10 victory over the previously unbeaten Dallas Cowboys on November 2, Nelsen spent a miserable afternoon against the Minnesota Vikings on the losing end of a 51–3 score. In addition, he briefly left that game with a pinched nerve in his throwing arm, a malady which would trouble him for the rest of the season.

In game two of the 1970 NFL season, Nelsen took yet another hit to his knees in a September 27 game against the San Francisco 49ers. The injury forced him out of the game and kept him on the sidelines the following week as well. After a mid-season slump, he was replaced for one game by rookie Mike Phipps, but returned to start the final five games. Unfortunately, the Browns dropped to a 7–7 mark and missed the postseason.

In 1971, Nelsen led the Browns to four wins in their first five games, but another mid-season slump once again relegated him to the bench for one game. Unlike the previous year, however, Nelsen led the team to five straight victories to again reach the playoffs. Nelsen briefly won the starting job to start the 1972 season, but gave way to Phipps after a 26–10 loss to the Green Bay Packers in the opening game. Weeks after the conclusion of the season, Nelsen underwent his fifth knee operation and announced his retirement.

In 2012, the Plain Dealer named Nelsen #52 on its list of the top 100 Browns of all time.

== NFL career statistics ==
Legend
	Led the league
**Bold**	Career high

=== Regular season ===
Year	Team	Games			Passing									Rushing					Sacks	
Year	Team	GP	GS	Record	Cmp	Att	Pct	Yds	Y/A	Lng	TD	Int	Rtg	Att	Yds	Avg	Lng	TD	Sck	Yds
1963	PIT	2	0	0–0	0	2	0.0	0	0.0	0	0	0	39.6	1	-6	-6.0	-6	0	1	11
1964	PIT	5	1	0–1	16	42	38.1	276	6.6	44	2	3	47.3	3	17	**5.7**	13	0	5	47
1965	PIT	12	12	2–10	121	270	44.8	1,917	7.1	87	8	17	52.7	**26**	**84**	3.2	**21**	**1**	**42**	**333**
1966	PIT	5	5	3–1–1	63	112	**56.3**	1,122	**10.0**	68	7	1	**107.8**	6	18	3.0	9	0	15	141
1967	PIT	8	5	1–3–1	74	165	44.8	1,125	6.8	58	10	9	65.3	9	-19	-2.1	11	0	22	186
1968	CLE	14	11	9–2	152	293	51.9	2,366	8.1	**87**	19	10	86.4	13	30	2.3	18	**1**	11	102
1969	CLE	14	14	**10–3–1**	**190**	**352**	54.0	**2,743**	7.8	82	**23**	19	78.8	5	-11	-2.2	3	0	17	164
1970	CLE	12	12	6–6	159	313	50.8	2,156	6.9	78	16	16	68.9	7	-4	-0.6	2	0	8	79
1971	CLE	14	13	9–4	174	325	53.5	2,319	7.1	53	13	**23**	60.3	13	-18	-1.4	4	0	22	222
1972	CLE	4	1	0–1	14	31	45.2	141	4.5	26	0	3	19.1	1	-2	-2.0	-2	0	3	29
Career		90	74	40-31-3	963	1,905	50.6	14,165	7.4	87	98	101	70.2	84	89	1.1	21	2	146	1,314

=== Postseason ===
Year	Team	Games			Passing									Rushing					Sacks	
Year	Team	GP	GS	Record	Cmp	Att	Pct	Yds	Y/A	Lng	TD	Int	Rtg	Att	Yds	Avg	Lng	TD	Sck	Yds
1968	CLE	2	2	**1–1**	24	51	47.1	335	6.6	**45**	1	**3**	50.7	**2**	-2	-1.0	**1**	0	**5**	**52**
1969	CLE	2	2	**1–1**	**35**	**60**	**58.3**	**400**	**6.7**	35	**2**	2	**75.7**	0	0	0.0	0	0	3	17
1971	CLE	1	1	0–1	9	21	42.9	104	5.0	39	0	**3**	18.8	**2**	-5	-2.5	-2	0	4	34
1972	CLE	1	0	0–0	0	0	0.0	0	0.0	0	0	0	0.0	0	0	0.0	0	0	0	0
Career		6	5	2-3	68	132	51.5	839	6.4	45	3	8	53.8	4	-7	-1.8	1	0	12	103

== Coaching career ==
On February 14, 1973, he was hired as an assistant coach for the New England Patriots, but resigned after two years. After briefly considering the Browns' open head coaching slot, he accepted an assistant position with the Atlanta Falcons. He resigned that position following the dismissal of head coach Marion Campbell.

On February 9, 1977, he was named quarterback coach of the Tampa Bay Buccaneers, reuniting him with his former college coach, John McKay. He spent the next six seasons in that role until being fired amid reports of conflict with Buccaneers quarterback Doug Williams and McKay. After sitting out the 1983 NFL season, Nelsen was hired by Detroit Lions' head coach Monte Clark, a former Browns teammate, as their offensive coordinator on January 20, 1984.

On April 11, 2019, Nelsen died in Orlando, Florida, at the age of 78.
