= Dick Compton =

American football player (born 1940)

Profile
- Position: Split end

Personal information
- Born: April 16, 1940 (age 86); Colorado City, Texas, U.S.
- Died: February 9, 2025; Irving, Texas, U.S.
- Listed height: 6 ft 2 in (1.88 m)
- Listed weight: 190 lb (86 kg)

Career information
- High school: Colorado (TX)
- College: McMurry

Career history
- Detroit Lions (1962–1964); Houston Oilers (1965); Pittsburgh Steelers (1967–1968)
- Stats at Pro Football Reference

Richard Lee Compton (born April 16, 1940) is an American former professional football player who was a split end for the Detroit Lions, Pittsburgh Steelers of the National Football League (NFL) and Houston Oilers of the American Football League (AFL). He played college football for the McMurry War Hawks.
