= John Hilton (American football) =

American football player (1942–2017)

No. 82, 86, 85, 81, 89
- Position: Tight end

Personal information
- Born: March 12, 1942; Albany, New York, U.S.
- Died: February 2, 2017 (aged 74); Richmond, Virginia, U.S.
- Listed height: 6 ft 5 in (1.96 m)
- Listed weight: 225 lb (102 kg)

Career information
- High school: Hermitage (Henrico, Virginia); Fork Union Military Academy (Fork Union, Virginia)
- College: Richmond (1960-1964)
- NFL draft: 1964: 6th round, 76th overall pick
- AFL draft: 1964: 16th round, 125th overall pick

Career history

Playing
- Pittsburgh Steelers (1965–1969); Green Bay Packers (1970); Minnesota Vikings (1971); Detroit Lions (1972–1973); Florida Blazers (1974)

Coaching
- Chicago Bears (1975–1977) Special teams / receivers coach; Washington Redskins (1978) Special teams / receivers coach; Washington Redskins (1979–1980) Special teams / tight ends coach; Green Bay Packers (1986) Special teams / offensive backs coach

Career NFL statistics
- Receptions: 144
- Receiving yards: 2,047
- Touchdowns: 16
- Stats at Pro Football Reference

John Hilton (March 12, 1942 – February 2, 2017) was a tight end in the National Football League (NFL) who played from 1965 to 1973 for four teams, most notably the Pittsburgh Steelers (1965–1969).

== Prep school and college ==
He played college football for the University of Richmond. He prepared for college by attending Fork Union Military Academy as a postgraduate in the 1959–1960 academic year where he played football and basketball.

== NFL career ==
He was selected in the 6th Round (76th overall) of the 1964 NFL draft by the Detroit Lions, but did not play for them before making his NFL debut with the Pittsburgh Steelers in 1965. He next played with the Green Bay Packers (1970) and Minnesota Vikings (1971), before returning to the Lions to play his last two years in the NFL (1972–1973). He went on to finish his career with the Florida Blazers of the WFL in 1974 after which Hilton moved into coaching.

== Later life and death ==
In 2008, John Hilton was announced as an inductee to the Virginia Sports Hall of Fame, joining fellow alumni from Fork Union, Sonny Randle and Rosie Thomas. He developed Alzheimer's disease and was in a period of declining health when he died after a fall on February 2, 2017. Hilton was one of at least 345 NFL players to be diagnosed after death with chronic traumatic encephalopathy (CTE), which is caused by repeated hits to the head.
