= J. R. Wilburn =

American football player (born 1943)

J.R. Wilburn
No. 86
- Position: Wide receiver

Personal information
- Born: April 27, 1943 (age 83); Portsmouth, Virginia, U.S.
- Listed height: 6 ft 2 in (1.88 m)
- Listed weight: 190 lb (86 kg)

Career information
- High school: Cradock (Portsmouth)
- College: South Carolina (1961-1965)
- NFL draft: 1965: 13th round, 171st overall pick
- AFL draft: 1965: Red Shirt 7th round, 56th overall pick

Career history
- Pittsburgh Steelers (1966–1970)

Awards and highlights
- First-team All-ACC (1965); Second-team All-ACC (1964); Virginia Sports Hall of Fame, 2004

Career NFL statistics
- Receptions: 123
- Receiving yards: 1,834
- Touchdowns: 8
- Stats at Pro Football Reference

Johnnie Richard Wilburn Jr. (born April 27, 1943) is an American former professional football player who was a wide receiver for five seasons in the National Football League (NFL) for the Pittsburgh Steelers. Wilburn played college football for the South Carolina Gamecocks.

== Early life ==
Wilburn grew up in a close-knit community where his father worked in the navy yards. Surrounded by neighborhood friends, Wilburn spent much of his childhood playing sports, which laid the foundation for his athletic pursuits.

Wilburn attended Cradock High School in Portsmouth, where he emerged as a promising wide receiver. His talent on the football field earned him a scholarship to the University of South Carolina, recruited by fellow Virginia Sports Hall of Famer Marvin Bass. At USC, Wilburn excelled in both football and track and field. As a split end, he led the team in receptions for three seasons and served as co-captain. In track, he was a standout in the javelin, long jump, triple jump, and high jump, once scoring the most points ever in a dual meet against the University of North Carolina.

Wilburn's collegiate achievements included being named to the All-Atlantic Coast Conference team, finishing his senior year with the second-most catches (38) in the ACC. He was also runner-up for ACC Athlete of the Year, received Honorable Mention All-American honors, and was twice named All-State. His performance in the 1965 Blue-Gray game set a record with 10 receptions. That same year, he was recognized as South Carolina’s Athlete of the Year and the Virginia Beach Sports Club’s Outstanding College Football Player from the Commonwealth of Virginia.

== Professional career ==
J.R. Wilburn enjoyed a notable professional football career as a wide receiver and tight end for the Pittsburgh Steelers from 1966 to 1970. After a standout collegiate tenure at the University of South Carolina, where he earned All-ACC honors and participated in the Blue-Gray game, Wilburn was selected in both the NFL and AFL drafts in 1965.

During his five-season NFL career, Wilburn appeared in 58 games, recording 123 receptions for 1,834 yards and eight touchdowns. His most productive season came in 1967, when he caught 51 passes for 767 yards and five touchdowns. A highlight of his career was a game against the Dallas Cowboys on October 22, 1967, where he amassed a career-high 142 yards from scrimmage.

Wilburn's tenure with the Steelers coincided with a period of transition for the team. He played under coaches Bill Austin and Chuck Noll, witnessing the early stages of the franchise's eventual rise to prominence. After being traded to the San Diego Chargers, Wilburn suffered injuries that led him to retire from professional football.

Following his football career, Wilburn worked for Reynolds Metals, which later became part of Alcoa, for 39 years. He began working there during the off-seasons of his football career and continued after retiring from the NFL.

In recognition of his contributions to the sport, Wilburn was inducted into the Virginia Sports Hall of Fame in 2004.
