= Jim Bradshaw =

American football player (1939–2026)

No. 24, 21
- Position: Safety

Personal information
- Born: January 13, 1939; St. Clairsville, Ohio, U.S.
- Died: September 15, 2026 (aged 87)
- Listed height: 6 ft 2 in (1.88 m)
- Listed weight: 205 lb (93 kg)

Career information
- High school: St. Clairsville
- College: Chattanooga (1958-1962)
- NFL draft: 1963: 18th round, 248th overall pick
- AFL draft: 1963: 20th round, 158th overall pick

Career history
- Pittsburgh Steelers (1963–1967); Cleveland Browns (1968)*
- * Offseason or practice squad member only

Career NFL statistics
- Interceptions: 11
- Fumble recoveries: 9
- Total return yards: 493
- Total touchdowns: 4
- Stats at Pro Football Reference

James Alfred Bradshaw (January 13, 1939 – September 15, 2026) was an American professional football player who was a safety for five seasons with the Pittsburgh Steelers of the National Football League (NFL).

== College career ==
Bradshaw graduated in 1958 from St. Clairsville High School and played quarterback in college for the Chattanooga Mocs. He was inducted into the Chattanooga Hall of Fame in 1962.

== Professional career ==
Bradshaw was drafted in the 18th round (248th overall) of the 1963 NFL Draft by the Steelers and in the 20th round (158th overall) in the 1963 AFL Draft by the Boston Patriots.

The Steelers moved him to safety and in five seasons he had 11 interceptions including two pick sixes for touchdowns. He also had nine fumble recoveries including two for touchdowns.

He tied a club record with three interceptions on the road against their in-state rivals, the Philadelphia Eagles, (including one of the aforementioned pick sixes) on October 24, 1965. Incredibly that 20-14 win by the Steelers that day was the last time Pittsburgh won in Philadelphia.

Pittsburgh traded Bradshaw to the Cleveland Browns on May 14, 1968, but he was released before the start of the season, ending his football career.

== Personal life and death ==
Following his playing career, Bradshaw worked as a realtor. He died on September 15, 2026, at the age of 87.
