= Don Shy =

American football player and hurdler (born 1945)

No. 25, 28, 24, 31
- Position: Running back

Personal information
- Born: November 15, 1945; Cleveland, Ohio, U.S.
- Died: October 26, 2006 (aged 60); Bellefontaine, Ohio, U.S.
- Listed height: 6 ft 1 in (1.85 m)
- Listed weight: 210 lb (95 kg)

Career information
- High school: Pomona (CA) Ganesha
- College: San Diego State
- NFL draft: 1967: 2nd round, 35th overall pick

Career history
- Pittsburgh Steelers (1967–1968); New Orleans Saints (1969); Chicago Bears (1970–1972); St. Louis Cardinals (1973); Southern California Sun (1975)

Career NFL statistics
- Rushing yards: 1,577
- Rushing average: 3.5
- Receptions: 76
- Receiving yards: 835
- Total touchdowns: 14
- Stats at Pro Football Reference

Donald Frederic Shy (November 15, 1945 – October 26, 2006) was an American professional football player who was a running back for seven seasons with the Pittsburgh Steelers, New Orleans Saints, Chicago Bears, and St. Louis Cardinals of the National Football League (NFL). He played college football for the San Diego State Aztecs.

Shy also ran track and field while at San Diego State University, as well as Mt. San Antonio College. He was inducted into the Mt. SAC Athletics Hall of Fame in 1993. He ran his personal best 13.61 in the 120 yard hurdles while taking second place at the 1966 AAU National Championships ahead of future world record holder and NFL player Earl McCullouch.
