= Bethel, Missouri =

Village in Shelby County, Missouri, United States

- Village
- Location of Bethel, Missouri
- Coordinates: 39°52′38″N 92°1′28″W
- Country: United States
- State: Missouri
- County: Shelby

Area
  - Total: 0.14 sq mi (0.36 km^{2})
  - Land: 0.14 sq mi (0.36 km^{2})
  - Water: 0 sq mi (0.00 km^{2})
- Elevation: 715 ft (218 m)

Population (2020)
  - Total: 135
  - Density: 978.5/sq mi (377.82/km^{2})
- Time zone: UTC-6 (Central (CST))
  - Summer (DST): UTC-5 (CDT)
- ZIP code: 63434
- Area code: 660
- FIPS code: 29-05104
- GNIS feature ID: 0714027

Bethel is a village in Shelby County, Missouri, United States. The population was 135 at the 2020 census.

== History ==
Bethel was founded as a Bible utopian colony in 1844 by Dr William Keil (1811–1877), a Prussian-born preacher. He and his followers, who were almost exclusively German immigrants to America, believed that the Book of Acts required that Christians hold all property and means of production in common and they organized their Colony accordingly. Traditionally male work was communally performed; however, traditionally female work was still individualized and performed in single family households.

By 1850, the Bethel Colony had a population of 500; by 1860, 600. It owned thousands of sheep, cattle and horses, and had over 3,500 acres under cultivation. It was the commercial center of the region. However, the construction of the Hannibal & St. Joseph Railroad threatened Dr. Keil's theocracy. In 1855, he led his some of his followers westward over the Oregon Trail, to eventually settle Aurora, Oregon and form the Aurora Colony. Other wagon trains followed in subsequent years. The remainder of the Bethel Colony retained their communal ownership of property and shared means of production until three years after his death in 1877. In 1880, the property was divided among the remaining members, thus ending Missouri's most successful communal experiment.

The Bethel Historic District, bounded by Liberty, King, 1st, and 4th Streets, was listed on the National Register of Historic Places in 1970. At least twenty of the buildings constructed by the Bethel Colony are still extant. These houses are on exhibit to visitors and to the public.

Also listed on the National Register of Historic Places are nearby Elim and Hebron.

== Geography ==
Bethel is located at 39°52′38″N 92°1′28″W (39.877205, -92.024433).

According to the United States Census Bureau, the village has a total area of 0.14 square miles (0.36 km^{2}), all land.

== Demographics ==
Historical population
Census	Pop.	Note	%±
1880	184		—
1900	225		—
1910	235		4.4%
1920	254		8.1%
1930	251		−1.2%
1940	217		−13.5%
1950	194		−10.6%
1960	152		−21.6%
1970	143		−5.9%
1980	132		−7.7%
1990	117		−11.4%
2000	121		3.4%
2010	122		0.8%
2020	135		10.7%
U.S. Decennial Census

=== 2010 census ===
As of the census of 2010, there were 122 people, 60 households, and 34 families living in the village. The population density was 871.4 inhabitants per square mile (336.4/km^{2}). There were 79 housing units at an average density of 564.3 per square mile (217.9/km^{2}). The racial makeup of the village was 93.4% White, 2.5% from other races, and 4.1% from two or more races. Hispanic or Latino of any race were 2.5% of the population.

There were 60 households, of which 25.0% had children under the age of 18 living with them, 43.3% were married couples living together, 8.3% had a female householder with no husband present, 5.0% had a male householder with no wife present, and 43.3% were non-families. 41.7% of all households were made up of individuals, and 20% had someone living alone who was 65 years of age or older. The average household size was 2.03 and the average family size was 2.74.

The median age in the village was 45.7 years. 21.3% of residents were under the age of 18; 5% were between the ages of 18 and 24; 22.2% were from 25 to 44; 27% were from 45 to 64; and 24.6% were 65 years of age or older. The gender makeup of the village was 53.3% male and 46.7% female.

=== 2000 census ===
As of the census of 2000, there were 121 people, 56 households, and 31 families living in the village. The population density was 856.5 inhabitants per square mile (330.7/km^{2}). There were 77 housing units at an average density of 545.0 per square mile (210.4/km^{2}). The racial makeup of the village was 98.35% White, and 1.65% from two or more races.

There were 56 households, out of which 26.8% had children under the age of 18 living with them, 44.6% were married couples living together, 10.7% had a female householder with no husband present, and 44.6% were non-families. 42.9% of all households were made up of individuals, and 17.9% had someone living alone who was 65 years of age or older. The average household size was 2.16 and the average family size was 3.03.

In the village, the population was spread out, with 24.0% under the age of 18, 10.7% from 18 to 24, 24.0% from 25 to 44, 25.6% from 45 to 64, and 15.7% who were 65 years of age or older. The median age was 40 years. For every 100 females, there were 112.3 males. For every 100 females age 18 and over, there were 80.4 males.

The median income for a household in the village was $22,083, and the median income for a family was $53,750. Males had a median income of $22,292 versus $21,000 for females. The per capita income for the village was $13,958. There were no families and 6.8% of the population living below the poverty line, including none under 18 and 42.9% of those over 64.

== Notable people ==
- Henry Theophilus Finck (1854-1926), musical critic
- James Frederick Kohn (1976-), author

== See also ==
- List of cities in Missouri

== Additional reading ==
- Nordhoff, Charles. The Communistic Societies of the United States from Personal Vision and Observation.... 1875. NY: Schocken Books, 1965.
- Hinds, William. American Communities and Co-Operative Colonies. Chicago: Charles H. Kerk & Co., 1908.
