= 1966 Pittsburgh Steelers season =

NFL team season

- Owner: Art Rooney
- Head coach: Bill Austin
- Home stadium: Pitt Stadium

Results
- Record: 5–8–1
- Division place: 6th NFL Eastern
- Playoffs: Did not qualify
- Pro Bowlers: K Mike Clark, RCB Brady Keys, RDE Ben McGee

The 1966 Pittsburgh Steelers season was the team's 34th in the National Football League.

== Offseason ==
=== NFL draft ===
1966 Pittsburgh Steelers draft
Round	Pick	Player	Position	College	Notes
1	3	Dick Leftridge	Running back	West Virginia	
2	19	Larry Gagner	Guard	Florida	
3	35	Pat Killorin	Center	Syracuse	
7	98	Emerson Boozer *	Running back	Maryland State	
9	128	Dale Stewart	Defensive end	Pittsburgh	
10	143	Jerry Marion	Defensive back	Wyoming	
11	158	Charley Washington	Running back	Grambling	
13	188	Benjy Dial	Quarterback	Eastern New Mexico	
Made roster * Made at least one Pro Bowl during career

=== Undrafted free agents ===
1966 undrafted free agents of note
Player	Position	College
Larry Dressell	Tackle	Dayton
Dick Keenan	Defensive end	Montclair State

== Roster ==
1966 Pittsburgh Steelers roster
Quarterbacks (QB): 11 Ron Meyer; 14 Bill Nelsen; 10 Ron Smith; Running backs (RB): 30 Willie Asbury; 49 Amos Bullocks; 23 Jim Butler; 42 Dick Hoak; 31 Dick Leftridge; 37 Bobby Smith; Wide receivers (WR): 85 Gary Ballman; 87 Roy Jefferson; 25 Jerry Simmons; 86 J. R. Wilburn; Tight ends (TE): 82 John Hilton; 84 Tony Jeter	Offensive linemen (OL): 71 Charlie Bradshaw T; 79 Larry Gagner G; 77 Dan James T; 55 Pat Killorin C; 68 Mike Magac G; 73 Ray Mansfield C; 72 Fran O'Brien T; 61 Eli Strand G; 62 Ralph Wenzel G; Defensive linemen (DL): 78 John Baker DE; 74 Riley Gunnels DT; 64 Chuck Hinton DT; 75 Ken Kortas DT; 60 Ben McGee DE; 65 Lloyd Voss DE	Linebackers (LB): 63 Rod Breedlove OLB; 52 Gene Breen OLB; 53 John Campbell OLB; 50 Bill Saul MLB; 34 Andy Russell OLB; Defensive backs (DB): 44 Willie Daniel CB; 29 Bob Hohn SS; 26 Brady Keys CB; 20 Paul Martha FS; 28 Clendon Thomas SS; 47 Marv Woodson CB; Special teams (ST): 83 Mike Clark K; 46 Frank Lambert P	Practice squad: None - Vacant; Reserve: 24 Jim Bradshaw S (IR); 58 Roger Pillath T (IR); 33 Theron Sapp RB (IR); Rookies in italics 43 active, 3 reserve, 0 practice squad

== Regular season ==
=== Schedule ===
Week	Date	Opponent	Result	Record	Venue
1	September 11	New York Giants	T 34–34	0–0–1	Pitt Stadium
2	September 18	Detroit Lions	W 17–3	1–0–1	Pitt Stadium
3	September 25	Washington Redskins	L 27–33	1–1–1	Pitt Stadium
4	October 2	at Washington Redskins	L 10–24	1–2–1	D.C. Stadium
5	October 8	at Cleveland Browns	L 10–41	1–3–1	Cleveland Municipal Stadium
6	October 16	Philadelphia Eagles	L 14–31	1–4–1	Pitt Stadium
7	Bye				
8	October 30	at Dallas Cowboys	L 21–52	1–5–1	Cotton Bowl
9	November 6	Cleveland Browns	W 16–6	2–5–1	Pitt Stadium
10	November 13	St. Louis Cardinals	W 30–9	3–5–1	Pitt Stadium
11	November 20	Dallas Cowboys	L 7–20	3–6–1	Pitt Stadium
12	November 27	at St. Louis Cardinals	L 3–6	3–7–1	Busch Stadium
13	December 4	at Philadelphia Eagles	L 23–27	3–8–1	Franklin Field
14	December 11	at New York Giants	W 47–28	4–8–1	Yankee Stadium
15	December 18	at Atlanta Falcons	W 57–33 (Note: This is the only game in NFL history with this final score)	5–8–1	Atlanta Stadium

- A bye week was necessary in 1966, as the league expanded to an odd-number (15) of teams (Atlanta); one team was idle each week.

=== Game summaries ===
==== Week 1 vs New York Giants ====
Week One: New York Giants (0-0) vs. Pittsburgh Steelers (0-0) - Game Summary

Quarter	1	2	3	4	Total
Giants	7	10	0	17	34
Steelers	7	7	17	3	34

at Pitt Stadium, Pittsburgh

- Date: September 11
- Game weather: 64 °F (18 °C)
- Pro Football Reference

Game information

First Quarter

- New York Giants – Homer Jones 75-yard pass from Earl Morrall (Gogolak kick), Giants 7-0
- Pittsburgh – Gary Ballman 9-yard pass from Bill Nelsen (Clark kick), 7–7

Second Quarter

- New York Giants – Bobby Crespino 19-yard pass from Earl Morrall (Gogolak kick), Giants 14-7
- Pittsburgh – Willie Asbury 6-yard run (Clark kick), 14–14
- New York Giants – Pete Gogolak 26-yard field goal, Giants 17-14

Third Quarter

- Pittsburgh – Simmons 21-yard pass from Bill Nelsen (Clark kick), Steelers 21–17
- Pittsburgh – Mike Clark 25-yard field goal, Steelers 24–17
- Pittsburgh – John Hilton 31-yard pass from Bill Nelsen (Clark kick), Steelers 31–17

Fourth Quarter

- New York Giants – Pete Gogolak 14-yard field goal, Steelers 31–20
- New York Giants – Homer Jones 98-yard pass from Earl Morrall (Gogolak kick) Steelers 31–27
- New York Giants – Wendall Harris 72-yard fumble return (Gogolak kick), Giants 34-31
- Pittsburgh – Mike Clark 41-yard field goal, 34–34

Top Passers

- NYG – Earl Morrall: 10/18, 273 yds, 3 TD, 2 INT
- NE – Bill Nelson: 16/27, 265 yds, 3 TD

Top rushers

- NYG – Chuck Mercien: 8 car, 14 yds
- PIT – Willie Asbury: 18 car, 83 yds. 1 TD

Top receivers

- NYG – Homer Jones: 2 rec, 173 yds. 2 TD
- PIT – Gary Ballman: 5 rec, 114 yds. 1 TD

==== Week 2 (Sunday September 18, 1966): Detroit Lions ====
	1	2	3	4	Total
Lions	0	0	0	3	3
Steelers	3	0	7	7	17

at Pitt Stadium, Pittsburgh, Pennsylvania

- Game time:
- Game weather:
- Game attendance: 35,473
- Referee:
- TV announcers:

Scoring Drives:

- Pittsburgh – FG Clark 13 3–0
- Pittsburgh – Hilton 32 pass from R. Smith (Clark kick)10–0
- Detroit – FG Walker 42 10–3
- Pittsburgh – Jefferson 84 pass from R. Smith (Clark kick)17–3

==== Week 3 (Sunday September 25, 1966): Washington Redskins ====
	1	2	3	4	Total
Redskins	9	0	21	3	33
Steelers	0	14	10	3	27

at Pitt Stadium, Pittsburgh, Pennsylvania

- Game time:
- Game weather:
- Game attendance: 37,505
- Referee:
- TV announcers:

Scoring Drives:

- Washington – FG Gogolak 41 0–3
- Washington – FG Gogolak 47 0–6
- Washington – FG Gogolak 29 0–9
- Pittsburgh – Ballman 49 pass from R. Smith (Clark kick)7–9
- Pittsburgh – J. Bradshaw 27 interception return (Clark kick)14–9
- Pittsburgh – Ballman 79 pass from R. Smith (Clark kick)21–9
- Washington – Taylor 4 pass from Jurgensen (Gogolak kick)21–16
- Pittsburgh – FG Clark 47 24–16
- Washington – Mitchell 35 pass from Jurgensen (Gogolak kick)24–23
- Washington – Taylor 2 run (Gogolak kick)24–30
- Washington – FG Gogolak 15 24–33
- Pittsburgh – FG Clark 42 27–33

==== Week 4 (Sunday October 2, 1966): Washington Redskins ====
	1	2	3	4	Total
Steelers	0	10	0	0	10
Redskins	10	0	7	7	24

at D.C. Stadium, Washington, DC

- Game time:
- Game weather:
- Game attendance: 47,360
- Referee:
- TV announcers:

Scoring Drives:

- Washington – Taylor 60 pass from Jurgensen (Gogolak kick)0–7
- Washington – FG Gogolak 12 0–10
- Pittsburgh – Hoak 2 run (Clark kick)7–10
- Pittsburgh – FG Clark 25 10–10
- Washington – Mitchell 51 pass from Jurgensen (Gogolak kick)10–17
- Washington – Mitchell 70 pass from Jurgensen (Gogolak kick)10–24

==== Week 5 (Saturday October 8, 1966): Cleveland Browns ====
	1	2	3	4	Total
Steelers	0	0	10	0	10
Browns	14	7	0	20	41

at Cleveland Municipal Stadium, Cleveland, Ohio

- Game time:
- Game weather:
- Game attendance: 82,687
- Referee:
- TV announcers:

Scoring Drives:

- Cleveland – Collins 23 pass from Ryan (Groza kick)0–7
- Cleveland – Collins 14 pass from Ryan (Groza kick)0–14
- Cleveland – Kelly 2 run (Groza kick)0–21
- Pittsburgh – Jefferson 23 pass from Izo (Clark kick)7–21
- Pittsburgh – FG Clark 16 10–21
- Cleveland – Kelly 10 run (kick failed)10–27
- Cleveland – Warfield 3 fumble return (Groza kick)10–34
- Cleveland – R. Smith 24 pass from Ninowski (Groza kick)10–41

==== Week 6 (Sunday October 16, 1966): Philadelphia Eagles ====
	1	2	3	4	Total
Eagles	0	14	0	17	31
Steelers	7	7	0	0	14

at Pitt Stadium, Pittsburgh, Pennsylvania

- Game time:
- Game weather:
- Game attendance: 28,233
- Referee:
- TV announcers:

Scoring Drives:

- Pittsburgh – Asbury 37 pass from Izo (Clark kick)7–0
- Philadelphia – Gros 11 run (Baker kick)7–7
- Pittsburgh – Asbury 11 run (Clark kick)14–7
- Philadelphia – Gros 1 run (Baker kick)14–14
- Philadelphia – Brown 9 pass from Snead (Baker kick)14–21
- Philadelphia – Goodwin 11 pass from Snead (Baker kick)14–28
- Philadelphia – FG Baker 51 14–31

==== Week 8 at Cowboys ====
Week Eight: Pittsburgh Steelers (1–4–1) at Dallas Cowboys (4–1–1)

Quarter	1	2	3	4	Total
Steelers	7	7	7	0	21
Cowboys	0	24	21	7	52

at Cotton Bowl, Dallas, Texas

- Date: October 30
- Game weather: 64 °F (18 °C)
- Game attendance: 58,453
- Box Score

Game information

First quarter

- PIT – Marv Woodson 56-yard interception return (Mike Clark kick). Steelers 7–0.

Second quarter

- DAL – Dan Reeves 1-yard pass from Don Meredith (Danny Villanueva kick). Tie 7–7. Drive:
- DAL – Lee Roy Jordan 49-yard interception return (Danny Villanueva kick). Cowboys 14–7.
- DAL – Danny Villanueva 12-yard field goal. Cowboys 17–7. Drive:
- DAL – Dan Reeves 8-yard pass from Don Meredith (Danny Villanueva kick). Cowboys 24–7. Drive:
- PIT – Jim Butler 93-yard kickoff return (Mike Clark kick). Cowboys 24–14.

Third quarter

- DAL – Mel Renfro 87-yard kickoff return (Danny Villanueva kick). Cowboys 31–14.
- DAL – Frank Clarke 22-yard pass from Don Meredith (Danny Villanueva kick). Cowboys 38–14. Drive:
- PIT – John Hilton 4-yard pass from Ron Smith (Mike Clark kick). Cowboys 38–21. Drive:
- DAL – Pete Gent 84-yard pass from Don Meredith (Danny Villanueva kick). Cowboys 45–21. Drive:

Fourth quarter

- DAL – J.D. Smith 1-yard run (Danny Villanueva kick). Cowboys 52–21. Drive:

Top passers

- PIT – Ron Smith – 8/25, 115 yards, TD
- DAL – Don Meredith – 11/25, 226 yards, 4 TD, 3 INT

Top rushers

- PIT – Jim Butler – 5 rushes, 9 yards
- DAL – Dan Reeves – 13 rushes, 66 yards

Top receivers

- PIT – Roy Jefferson – 4 receptions, 74 yards
- DAL – Pete Gent – 1 reception, 84 yards, TD

==== Week 9 vs Browns ====
Week Nine: Cleveland Browns (5–2) at Pittsburgh Steelers (1–5–1)

Quarter	1	2	3	4	Total
Browns	0	6	0	0	6
Steelers	0	3	3	10	16

at Pitt Stadium, Pittsburgh, Pennsylvania

- Date: November 6, 1966
- Game weather: 35 °F (2 °C)
- Game attendance: 36,690
- Box Score

Team	Category	Player	Statistics
Browns	Passing	Frank Ryan	19/37, 228 Yds, TD, 5 INT
Browns	Rushing	Leroy Kelly	19 Rush, 82 Yds
Browns	Receiving	Gary Collins	7 Rec, 93 Yds, TD
Steelers	Passing	Ron Smith	11/19, 151 Yds, TD
Steelers	Rushing	Willie Asbury	17 Rush, 94 Yds
Steelers	Receiving	Gary Ballman	7 Rec, 88 Yds, TD

Scoring summary

Quarter	Time	Drive			Team	Scoring information	Score	
Quarter	Time	Plays	Yards	TOP	Team	Scoring information	CLE	PIT
2					Browns	Gary Collins 24-yard touchdown reception from Frank Ryan, kick no good	6	0
2					Steelers	28-yard field goal by Mike Clark	6	3
2					Steelers	25-yard field goal by Mike Clark	6	6
3					Steelers	Gary Ballman 8-yard touchdown reception from Ron Smith, Mike Clark kick good	6	13
4					Steelers	42-yard field goal by Mike Clark	6	16
"TOP" = time of possession. For other American football terms, see Glossary of American football.							6	16

==== Week 10 (Sunday November 13, 1966): St. Louis Cardinals ====
	1	2	3	4	Total
Cardinals	9	0	0	0	9
Steelers	3	10	3	14	30

at Pitt Stadium, Pittsburgh, Pennsylvania

- Game time:
- Game weather:
- Game attendance: 28,552
- Referee:
- TV announcers:

Scoring Drives:

- St. Louis – FG Bakken 37 0–3
- St. Louis – FG Bakken 17 0–6
- St. Louis – FG Bakken 12 0–9
- Pittsburgh – FG Clark 40 3–9
- Pittsburgh – Russell 14 blocked punt return (Clark kick)10–9
- Pittsburgh – FG Clark 33 13–9
- Pittsburgh – FG Clark 22 16–9
- Pittsburgh – Hilton 11 pass from R. Smith (Clark kick)23–9
- Pittsburgh – Jefferson 42 pass from Hoak30–9

==== Week 11 (Sunday November 20, 1966): Dallas Cowboys ====
	1	2	3	4	Total
Cowboys	0	10	3	7	20
Steelers	0	7	0	0	7

at Pitt Stadium, Pittsburgh, Pennsylvania

- Game time:
- Game weather:
- Game attendance: 42,185
- Referee:
- TV announcers:

Scoring Drives:

- Dallas – Meredith 3 run (Villanueva kick)0–7
- Dallas – FG Villandueva 27 0–10
- Pittsburgh – Asbury 11 pass from R. Smith (Clark kick)7–10
- Dallas – FG Villanueva 37 7–13
- Dallas – Hayes 38 pass from Meredith (Villanueva kick)7–20

==== Week 12 (Sunday November 27, 1966): St. Louis Cardinals ====
	1	2	3	4	Total
Steelers	3	0	0	0	3
Cardinals	3	0	3	0	6

at Busch Memorial Stadium, St. Louis, Missouri

- Game time:
- Game weather:
- Game attendance: 46,099
- Referee:
- TV announcers:

Scoring Drives:

- Pittsburgh – FG Clark 47 3–0
- St. Louis – FG Bakken 26 3–3
- St. Louis – FG Bakken 15 3–6

==== Week 13 (Sunday December 4, 1966): Philadelphia Eagles ====
	1	2	3	4	Total
Steelers	0	13	3	7	23
Eagles	3	10	7	7	27

at Franklin Field, Philadelphia, Pennsylvania

- Game time:
- Game weather:
- Game attendance: 54,275
- Referee:
- TV announcers:

Scoring Drives:

- Philadelphia – FG Baker 35 0–3
- Pittsburgh – Asbury 7 run (Clark kick)7–3
- Pittsburgh – FG Clark 37 10–3
- Philadelphia – Woodeshick 3 run (Baker kick)10–10
- Philadelphia – FG Baker 22 10–13
- Pittsburgh – FG Clark 32 13–13
- Pittsburgh – FG Clark 35 16–13
- Philadelphia – Woodeshick 1 run (Baker kick)16–20
- Philadelphia – Concannon 1 run (Baker kick)16–27
- Pittsburgh – Asbury 2 run (Clark kick)23–27

==== Week 14 at New York Giants ====
Week Fourteen: Pittsburgh Steelers (3-8-1) at New York Giants (1-10-1)

Quarter	1	2	3	4	Total
Steelers	5	14	21	7	47
Giants	0	14	7	7	28

at Yankee Stadium, New York City

- Date: December 11
- Game weather: 54 °F (12 °C)
- Box Score

Game information

First Quarter

- Pittsburgh – Safety, Spider Lockhart stepped out of endzone, Steelers 2-0.
- Pittsburgh – Mike Clark 12-yard field goal, Steelers 5–0.

Second Quarter

- Pittsburgh – Amos Bullocks 13-yard pass from Bill Nelsen (Clark kick), Steelers 12–0.
- New York – Aaron Thomas 1-yard pass from Tom Kennedy (Gogolak kick), Steelers 12-7.
- Pittsburgh – Dick Leftridge 2-yard run (Clark kick), Steelers 19–7.
- New York – Homer Jones 82-yard pass from Tom Kennedy (Gogolak kick), Steelers 19–14.

Third Quarter

- Pittsburgh – Willie Asbury 1-yard run (Clark kick), Steelers 26–14.
- Pittsburgh – Willie Asbury 1-yard run (Clark kick), Steelers 33–14.
- New York – Aaron Thomas 5-yard pass from Tom Kennedy (Gogolak kick), Steelers 33-21.
- Pittsburgh – Cannonball Butler 66-yard pass from Bill Nelsen (Clark kick), Steelers 40–21.

Fourth Quarter

- Pittsburgh – Dick Leftridge 2-yard run (extra point pass successful), Steelers 47–21.
- New York – Bobby Crespino 16-yard pass from Tom Kennedy (Gogolak kick), Steelers 47-28.

Top Passers

- Steelers – Bill Nelsen: 17/31, 322 yds, 2 TD, 1 INT
- Giants– Tom Kennedy: 14/24, 229 yds, 4 TD

Top rushers

- Steelers – Willie Asbury: 9 car, 19 yds. 2 TD
- Giants – Allen Jacobs: 14 car, 60 yds

Top receivers

- Steelers – Cannonball Butler: 2 rec, 80 yds. 1 TD
- Giants – Homer Jones: 3 rec, 111 yds. 1 TD

==== Week 15 (Sunday December 18, 1966): Atlanta Falcons ====
	1	2	3	4	Total
Steelers	6	23	21	7	57
Falcons	0	7	14	12	33

at Atlanta Stadium, Atlanta, Georgia

- Game time:
- Game weather:
- Game attendance: 56,229
- Referee:
- TV announcers:

Scoring Drives:

- Pittsburgh – FG Clark 22 3–0
- Pittsburgh – FG Clark 19 6–0
- Pittsburgh – Ballman 12 pass from Nelsen (Clark kick)13–0
- Pittsburgh – Bullocks 13 run (Clark kick)20–0
- Atlanta – Coffey 1 run (Kirouac kick)20–7
- Pittsburgh – Butler 1 run (run failed)26–7
- Pittsburgh – FG Clark 21 29–7
- Atlanta – Ridlehuber 53 pass from Johnson (Kirouac kick)29–14
- Pittsburgh – Butler 1 run (Clark kick)36–14
- Pittsburgh – Jefferson 68 pass from Nelsen (Clark kick)43–14
- Pittsburgh – Thomas 23 fumble return (Clark kick)50–14
- Atlanta – Ridlehuber 19 pass form Johnson (Kirouac kick)50–21
- Pittsburgh – Asbury 2 run (Clark kick)57–21
- Atlanta – Anderson 62 pass from Claridge (kick failed)57–27
- Atlanta – Anderson 12 pass from Claridge (kick failed)57–33

== Standings ==
NFL Eastern Conference
	W	L	T	PCT	CONF	PF	PA	STK
Dallas Cowboys	10	3	1	.769	9–3–1	445	239	W1
Cleveland Browns	9	5	0	.643	9–4	403	259	W1
Philadelphia Eagles	9	5	0	.643	8–5	326	340	W4
St. Louis Cardinals	8	5	1	.615	7–5–1	264	265	L3
Washington Redskins	7	7	0	.500	7–6	351	355	L1
Pittsburgh Steelers	5	8	1	.385	4–8–1	316	347	W2
Atlanta Falcons	3	11	0	.214	2–5	204	437	L1
New York Giants	1	12	1	.077	1–11–1	263	501	L8

Note: Tie games were not officially counted in the standings until 1972.
