= North Marion High School =

North Marion High School may refer to:

- North Marion High School (Florida) — Citra, Florida
- North Marion High School (Oregon) — Aurora, Oregon
- North Marion High School (West Virginia) — Rachel, West Virginia (postal address in Farmington)
