= Bill Austin (American football, born 1928) =

American football player and coach (1928–2013)

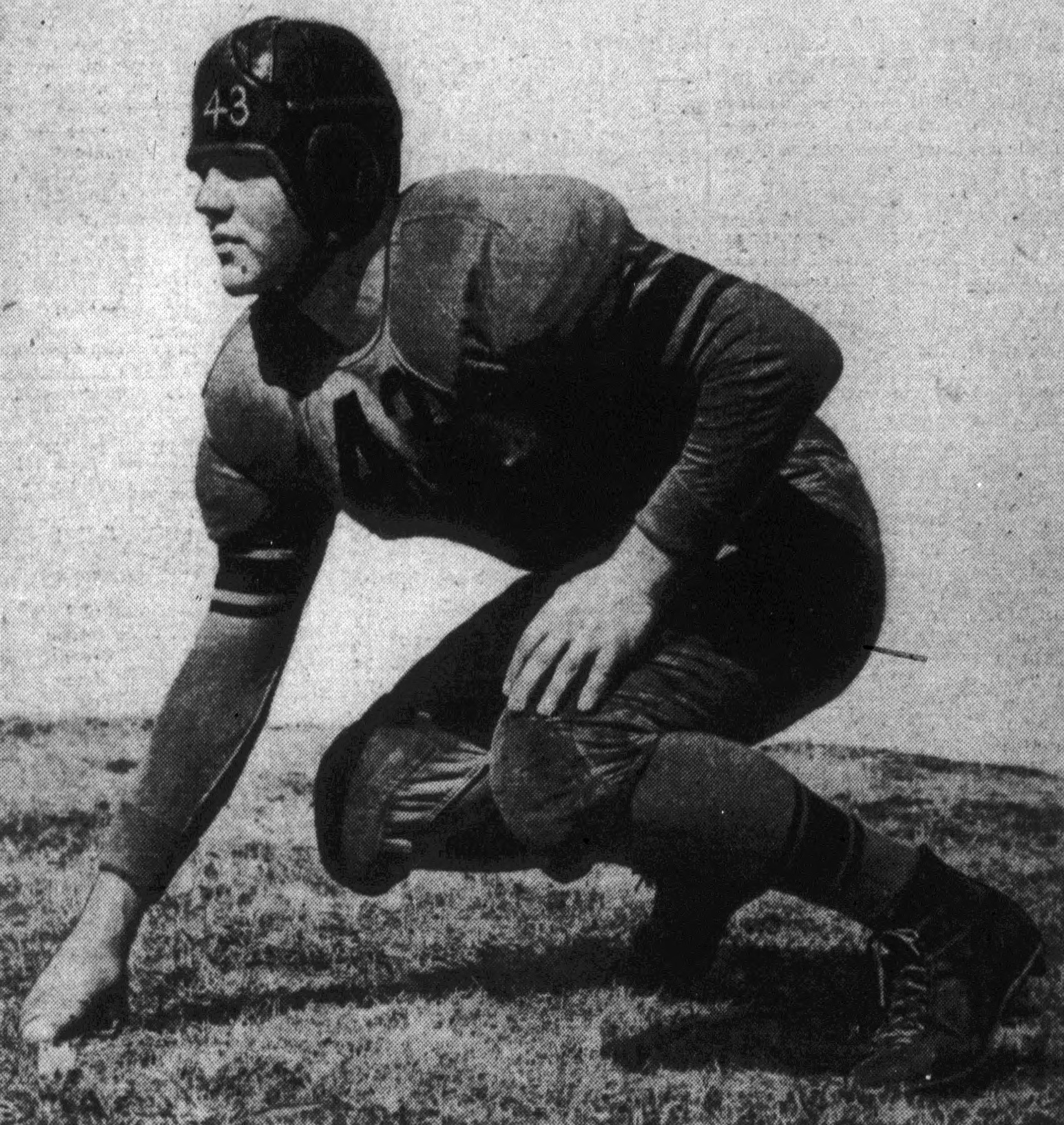
- Austin, circa 1946

No. 75, 60
- Positions: Guard, tackle

Personal information
- Born: October 18, 1928; San Pedro, California, U.S.
- Died: May 22, 2013 (aged 84); Las Vegas, Nevada, U.S.
- Listed height: 6 ft 1 in (1.85 m)
- Listed weight: 223 lb (101 kg)

Career information
- High school: Woodburn (OR)
- College: Oregon State (1945–1948)
- NFL draft: 1949: 13th round, 126th overall pick

Career history

Playing
- New York Giants (1949–1950, 1953–1957)

Coaching
- Wichita (NCAA) (1958) Assistant coach; Green Bay Packers (1959–1964) Offensive line coach; Los Angeles Rams (1965) Offensive line coach; Pittsburgh Steelers (1966–1968) Head coach; Washington Redskins (1969) Offensive line coach; Washington Redskins (1970) Head coach; Chicago Bears (1971) Offensive line coach; St. Louis Cardinals (1972) Offensive line/running backs coach; Washington Redskins (1973–1977) Offensive line coach; New York Giants (1979–1982) Offensive line coach; New Jersey Generals (1983–1984) Offensive coordinator/offensive line coach; New York Jets (1985) Offensive line coach

Awards and highlights
- As player: NFL champion (1956); Second-team All-Pro (1955); Pro Bowl (1954); First-team All-PCC (1948); Oregon Sports Hall of Fame (1982); As coach: 2× NFL champion (1961, 1962)

Career NFL statistics
- Games played: 76
- Games started: 60
- Fumble recoveries: 6
- Stats at Pro Football Reference

Head coaching record
- Regular season: 17–36–3 (.330)
- Coaching profile at Pro Football Reference

William Lee Austin (October 18, 1928 – May 22, 2013) was an American professional football player and coach in the National Football League (NFL). He played as a lineman for the New York Giants for seven seasons and was the head coach of the Pittsburgh Steelers from 1966 to 1968. Austin also served as the head coach of the Washington Redskins in 1970 following Vince Lombardi's death.

== Early life ==
Born in San Pedro, California, Austin was raised in Oregon and graduated from Woodburn High School, south of Portland. He played college football at Oregon State College in Corvallis, earning All-Coast honors as a tackle in 1948 and played in the 1949 East–West Shrine Game. He was inducted into the OSU Athletics Hall of Fame and was a member of Phi Delta Theta fraternity.

== Playing career ==
Selected in the thirteenth round of the 1949 NFL draft with the 126th overall pick, Austin played seven seasons with the Giants, including the 1956 title year. He missed the 1951 and 1952 seasons due to military service in the U.S. Army, stationed in San Francisco and Tokyo. He made the Pro Bowl in 1954 and retired after the 1957 season.

== Coaching career ==
Austin began his coaching career at Wichita University for a season in 1958, then joined first-year head coach Vince Lombardi as offensive line coach for the Green Bay Packers in 1959. Lombardi was the offensive coordinator of the Giants for the previous five seasons, including the 1956 championship year. Austin coached in Green Bay for six seasons, mentoring pulling guards Jerry Kramer and Fuzzy Thurston, and hall of famers Forrest Gregg and Jim Ringo. The Packers played in the NFL championship game for three consecutive seasons, with wins in 1961 and 1962.

Seeking a warmer climate for his wife's health, Austin left Green Bay after the 1964 season for the Los Angeles Rams for a season as an assistant, then became head coach of the Pittsburgh Steelers at age 37 in January 1966, with a recommendation by Lombardi. He failed to produce a winning season in three seasons, finishing 11–28–3 (.298), and was fired after the 1968 season (2–11–1), succeeded by Chuck Noll.

Austin rejoined Lombardi in Washington as an assistant in 1969, then took over as head coach when Lombardi died of cancer before the 1970 season on September 3. Dismissed by telephone after that 6–8 season, he returned to his role as an assistant coach in the NFL (and USFL) for the remainder of his career, including a stint as offensive line coach for the Giants in the early 1980s.

Austin was inducted into the Oregon Sports Hall of Fame in 1982, and retired to Las Vegas in 1985. He died at age 84 at his home in Las Vegas in 2013.

== Head coaching record ==
| Team | Year | Regular season | | | | | Postseason | | | |
| Team | Year | Won | Lost | Ties | Win % | Finish | Won | Lost | Win % | Result |
|---|---|---|---|---|---|---|---|---|---|---|
| PIT | 1966 | 5 | 8 | 1 | .385 | 6th in Eastern Conference | – | – | – | |
| PIT | 1967 | 4 | 9 | 1 | .308 | 4th in Century Division | – | – | – | |
| PIT | 1968 | 2 | 11 | 1 | .154 | 4th in Century Division | – | – | – | |
| PIT Total | | 11 | 28 | 3 | .282 | | – | – | – | |
| WAS | 1970 | 6 | 8 | 0 | .429 | 4th in NFC East | – | – | – | |
| NFL Total | | 17 | 36 | 3 | .321 | | – | – | – | |

- Note: Tie games were not officially counted in the standings until 1972.
