= UAO =

UAO may refer to:

- Aurora State Airport, Oregon, United States, FAA LID UAO
- Uppsala Astronomical Observatory, in Sweden
- Unidentified Aerial Object or Unidentified Airborne Object, another term for unidentified flying object
