= Elim (Bethel, Missouri) =

Historic house in Missouri, United States

- U.S. National Register of Historic Places
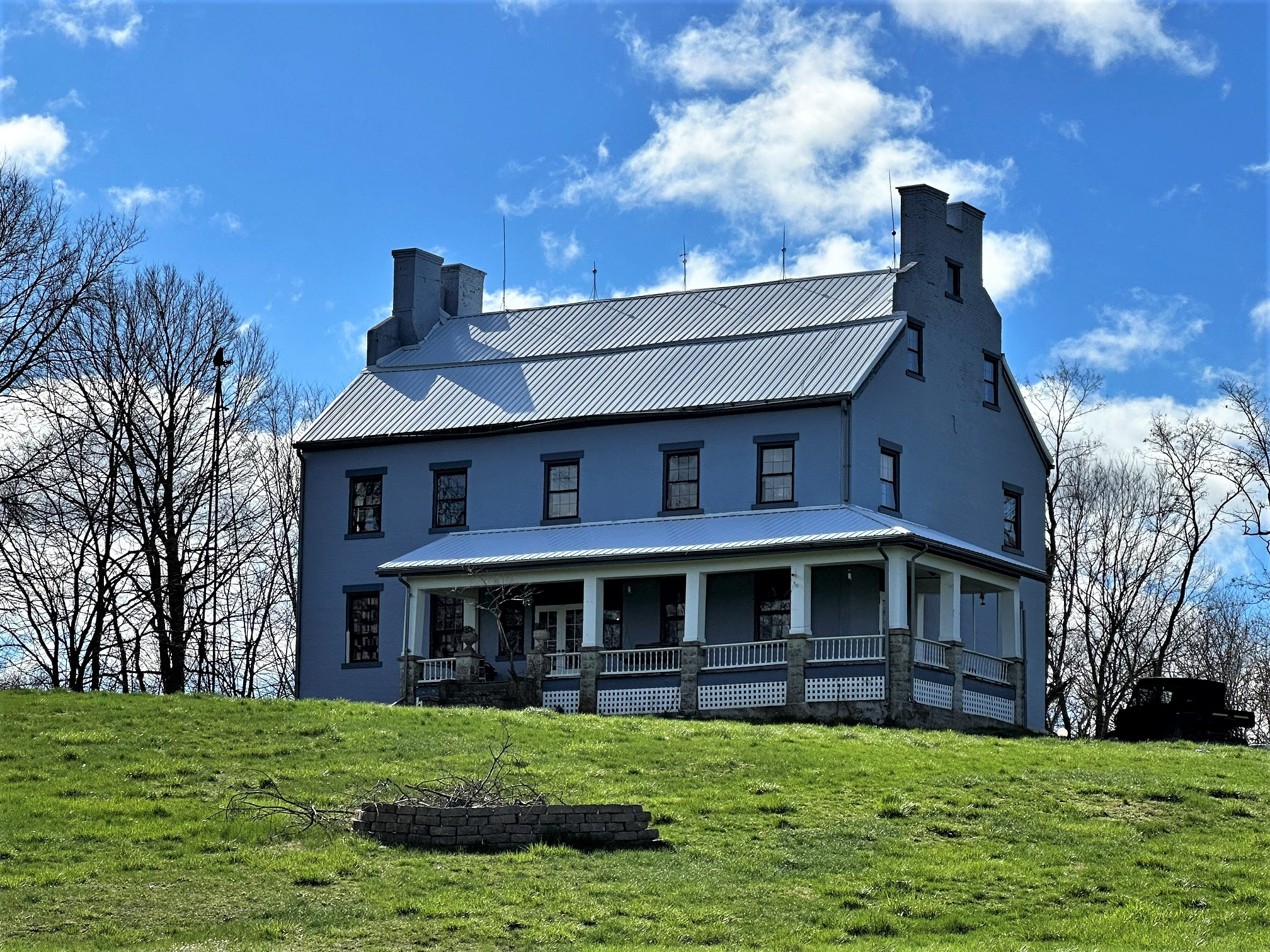
- Elim in 2024

- Location within Missouri Location within the United States
- Location: 1.5 miles east of Bethel, Bethel, Missouri
- Coordinates: 39°52′10″N 92°0′10″W
- Area: 9.9 acres (4.0 ha)
- Built: c. 1845
- NRHP reference No.: 71000477
- Added to NRHP: May 27, 1971

Elim, also known as the Dr. William Keil House, is a historic home located near Bethel, Shelby County, Missouri. It was built in the late-1840s, and is a 2 1/2-story, brick and stone dwelling over a full basement. It has a simple ridge roof and two porches. It was built by the members of the Society of Bethel and served as the residence of the society's founder Dr. William Keil (1812–1877).

It was listed on the National Register of Historic Places in 1971.

== See also ==
- Hebron
