= Donald, Oregon =

- City
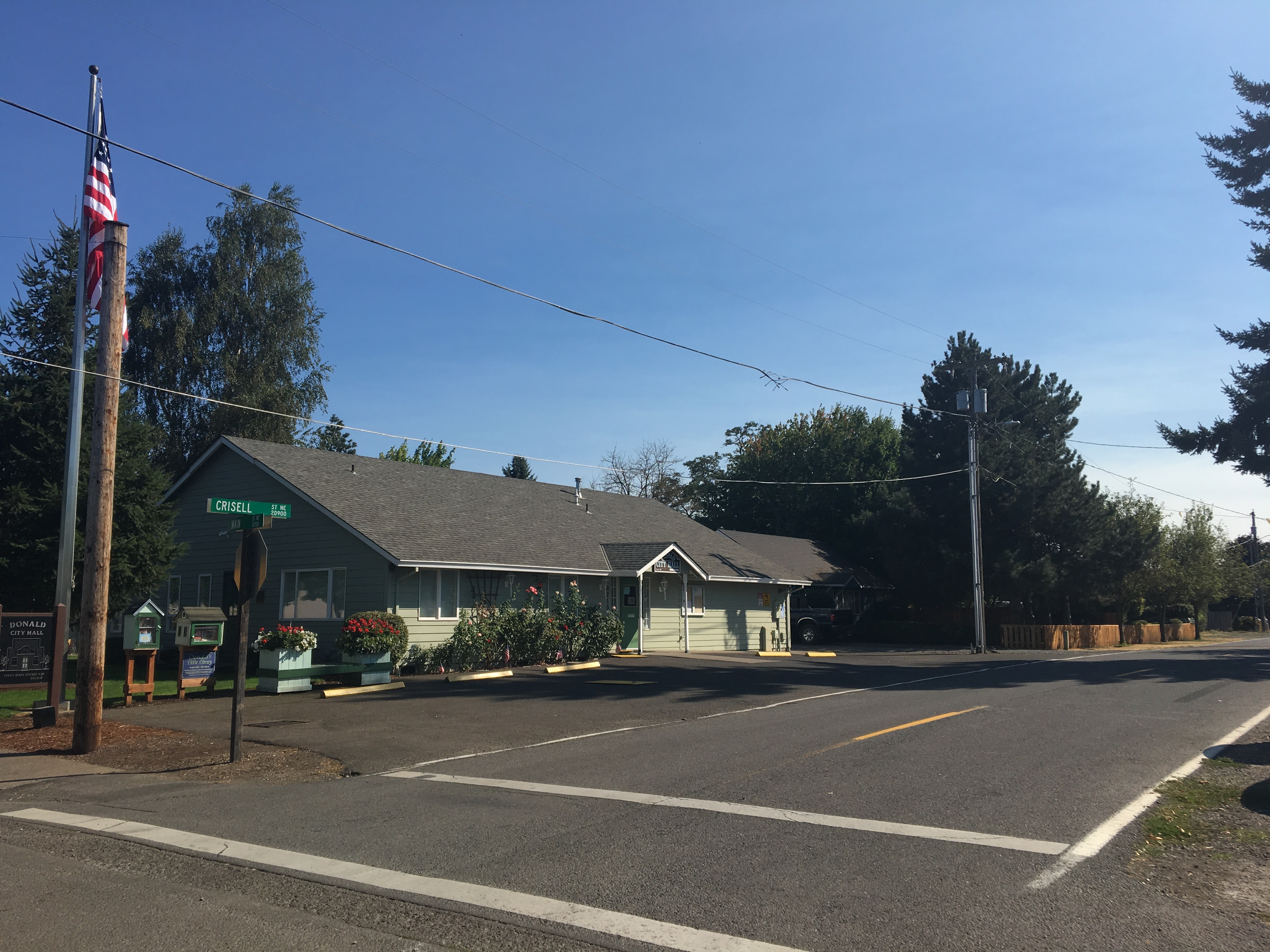
- Donald City Hall

- Location in Oregon
- Coordinates: 45°13′17″N 122°50′16″W
- Country: United States
- State: Oregon
- County: Marion
- Incorporated: 1912

Government
  - Mayor: Rick Olmsted

Area
  - Total: 0.38 sq mi (0.98 km^{2})
  - Land: 0.38 sq mi (0.98 km^{2})
  - Water: 0 sq mi (0.00 km^{2})
- Elevation: 197 ft (60 m)

Population (2020)
  - Total: 1,009
  - Density: 2,661.4/sq mi (1,027.57/km^{2})
- Time zone: UTC-8 (Pacific)
  - Summer (DST): UTC-7 (Pacific)
- ZIP Code: 97020
- Area code: 503
- FIPS code: 41-20100
- GNIS feature ID: 2410344
- Website: www.donaldoregon.gov

Donald is a city in Marion County, Oregon, United States. The population was 1,009 at the 2020 census. It is part of the Salem Metropolitan Statistical Area.

== History ==
Donald has a rich history in agriculture, industry, business and family. Sometime between 1840 and 1860 Donald was settled by farmers and loggers from the Midwest. By the early 1900s, Donald was a main station for the Oregon Electric Railway, which connected Portland and Eugene. The city was named after R. L. Donald, an engineer for the construction company that built the railway. Donald was built from Donation Land Claims sold by R. L. Donald to the Donald Town Lot and Land Company in 1908. The original community was centered on agricultural land growing hops. The town grew primarily on the hop crop until the Oregon Electric Railway located a substation and depot in Donald. It was part of the railway mainline between Salem and Portland. The substation was completed in 1906. The post office was established April 13, 1910, and the town was home to the Donald Brick and Tile works from 1911 until 1923. The completion of paved Highway 99W to the west negatively affected the railway ridership. The electrified passenger service was discontinued through Donald on May 14, 1933. During this time, the population dropped from 300 to 100. In 1947 the railway transitioned to steam power and in 1948 to diesel power. In 1970 the rail line merged into Burlington Northern. The rail line is still heavily used today by the Portland and Western Railroad.

== Geography ==
Donald is in northern Marion County in the Willamette Valley, 23 miles (37 km) northeast of Salem, the state capital, and 24 miles (39 km) southwest of Portland. Interstate 5 passes 1 mile (1.6 km) to the east of Donald, with access from Exit 278, 2 miles (3 km) to the northeast.

According to the U.S. Census Bureau, Donald has a total area of 0.38 square miles (0.98 km^{2}), all and.

== Demographics ==
Historical population
Census	Pop.	Note	%±
1920	126		—
1930	114		−9.5%
1940	164		43.9%
1950	187		14.0%
1960	201		7.5%
1970	231		14.9%
1980	267		15.6%
1990	316		18.4%
2000	612		93.7%
2010	979		60.0%
2020	1,009		3.1%
U.S. Decennial Census

=== 2020 census ===
As of the 2020 census, Donald had a population of 1,009. The median age was 41.2 years.

23.1% of residents were under the age of 18 and 16.9% of residents were 65 years of age or older. For every 100 females there were 105.1 males, and for every 100 females age 18 and over there were 101.0 males age 18 and over.

0% of residents lived in urban areas, while 100.0% lived in rural areas.

There were 363 households in Donald, of which 32.0% had children under the age of 18 living in them. Of all households, 54.8% were married-couple households, 16.0% were households with a male householder and no spouse or partner present, and 20.4% were households with a female householder and no spouse or partner present. About 16.8% of all households were made up of individuals and 5.8% had someone living alone who was 65 years of age or older.

There were 376 housing units, of which 3.5% were vacant. Among occupied housing units, 84.0% were owner-occupied and 16.0% were renter-occupied. The homeowner vacancy rate was 1.0% and the rental vacancy rate was 1.7%.

Racial composition as of the 2020 census
Race	Number	Percent
White	734	72.7%
Black or African American	9	0.9%
American Indian and Alaska Native	22	2.2%
Asian	13	1.3%
Native Hawaiian and Other Pacific Islander	0	0%
Some other race	90	8.9%
Two or more races	141	14.0%
Hispanic or Latino (of any race)	232	23.0%

=== 2010 census ===
As of the 2010 census, there were 979 people, 347 households, and 281 families living in the city. The population density was 4,450.0 inhabitants per square mile (1,718.2/km^{2}). There were 372 housing units at an average density of 1,690.9 per square mile (652.9/km^{2}). The racial makeup of the city was 88.3% White, 0.6% African American, 0.3% Native American, 0.5% Asian, 0.3% Pacific Islander, 6.1% from other races, and 3.9% from two or more races. Hispanic or Latino of any race were 14.6% of the population.

There were 347 households, of which 35.2% had children under the age of 18 living with them, 64.3% were married couples living together, 10.1% had a female householder with no husband present, 6.6% had a male householder with no wife present, and 19.0% were non-families. 14.7% of all households were made up of individuals, and 4.3% had someone living alone who was 65 years of age or older. The average household size was 2.82 and the average family size was 3.06.

The median age in the city was 38.9 years. 23.6% of residents were under the age of 18; 8% were between the ages of 18 and 24; 26.7% were from 25 to 44; 31.9% were from 45 to 64; and 9.7% were 65 years of age or older. The gender makeup of the city was 50.2% male and 49.8% female.

=== 2000 census ===
As of the 2000 census, there were 608 people, 202 households, and 163 families living in the city. The population density was 2,737.9 inhabitants per square mile (1,057.1/km^{2}). There were 236 housing units at an average density of 1,062.7 per square mile (410.3/km^{2}). The racial makeup of the city was 89.14% White, 0.16% African American, 1.48% Native American, 0.33% Asian, 0.16% Pacific Islander, 6.91% from other races, and 1.81% from two or more races. Hispanic or Latino of any race were 11.18% of the population.

There were 202 households, out of which 43.6% had children under the age of 18 living with them, 68.8% were married couples living together, 7.9% had a female householder with no husband present, and 19.3% were non-families. 12.9% of all households were made up of individuals, and 2.0% had someone living alone who was 65 years of age or older. The average household size was 3.01 and the average family size was 3.34.

In the city, the population was spread out, with 31.3% under the age of 18, 7.2% from 18 to 24, 35.5% from 25 to 44, 20.4% from 45 to 64, and 5.6% who were 65 years of age or older. The median age was 31 years. For every 100 females, there were 117.1 males. For every 100 females age 18 and over, there were 113.3 males.

The median income for a household in the city was $45,208, and the median income for a family was $50,227. Males had a median income of $31,696 versus $30,078 for females. The per capita income for the city was $16,752. About 6.3% of families and 6.9% of the population were below the poverty line, including 12.0% of those under age 18 and none of those age 65 or over.

== Education ==
Donald sends its students to North Marion School District, including to North Marion High School.
