= Hebron (Bethel, Missouri) =

Historic house in Missouri, United States

- U.S. National Register of Historic Places
- Location within Missouri Location within the United States
- Location: 0.8 miles (1.3 km) northwest of Bethel, Bethel, Missouri
- Coordinates: 39°53′23″N 92°01′46″W
- Area: 65 acres (26 ha)
- Built: 1852
- NRHP reference No.: 78001677
- Added to NRHP: January 31, 1978

Hebron is a historic home located near Bethel, Shelby County, Missouri. It was built about 1852, and is a two-story, brick and wood-frame building sheathed with clapboard. It has a medium pitched gable roof. It is a remaining building in one of four support areas associated with the Bethel German Conmunal Colony which lasted from 1844 to 1879, and founded by Dr. William Keil (1812-1877).

It was listed on the National Register of Historic Places in 1978.

== See also ==
- Elim
