= Jim Butler (American football) =

American football player (1943–2014)

- Butler in 1972

No. 23, 33, 36
- Position: Running back

Personal information
- Born: May 4, 1943; Quincy, Florida, U.S.
- Died: February 10, 2014 (aged 70); Atlanta, Georgia, U.S.
- Listed height: 5 ft 9 in (1.75 m)
- Listed weight: 194 lb (88 kg)

Career information
- High school: Carver (Delray Beach, Florida)
- College: Edward Waters
- NFL draft: 1965: 14th round, 186th overall pick

Career history
- Pittsburgh Steelers (1965–1967); Atlanta Falcons (1968–1971); St. Louis Cardinals (1972)

Awards and highlights
- Pro Bowl (1969)

Career NFL statistics
- Rushing yards: 2,768
- Rushing average: 3.5
- Receptions: 89
- Receiving yards: 959
- Total touchdowns: 17
- Stats at Pro Football Reference

James "Cannonball" Butler (May 4, 1943 – February 10, 2014) was an American professional football player who was a running back for eight seasons in the National Football League (NFL), with the Pittsburgh Steelers, the Atlanta Falcons and the St. Louis Cardinals. Butler grew up in Delray Beach, Florida and played college football at Edward Waters College in Jacksonville, Florida. To this day, he is the only alumnus from the school to ever play in the NFL.

In the NFL, Butler was the leading rusher for the Atlanta Falcons in each of his four seasons with the team (1968–1971), and was selected to the Pro Bowl in 1969.

== Biography ==
Jim Butler was born May 4, 1943, in Quincy, Florida.

Jim "Cannonball" Butler carrying the ball against the Los Angeles Rams, October 1971.

Butler played collegiately for Edward Waters College, a small historically black university located in Jacksonville.

Butler was selected in the 14th round of the 1965 NFL draft by the Pittsburgh Steelers, who made him that year's 186th overall pick. He played halfback for the Steelers for three years, gaining a little more than 500 yards rushing and an additional 233 catching passes out of the backfield. He was also a frequent kickoff returner for Pittsburgh, running back one kick 93 yards for a touchdown in 1966.

Butler was named a member of the NFL Pro Bowl following the conclusion of the 1969 NFL season.

After his retirement from the NFL, Butler worked for the city of Atlanta and on special projects with the Atlanta Public Schools system.

During his later years Butler suffered from dementia, a common ailment among aging football players of his era due to repetitive brain injury.

Butler died February 10, 2014 in Atlanta. He was 71 years old at the time of his death and was survived by a daughter and a son.

== NFL career statistics ==
Legend
**Bold**	Career high

Year	Team	Games		Rushing					Receiving				
Year	Team	GP	GS	Att	Yds	Avg	Lng	TD	Rec	Yds	Avg	Lng	TD
1965	PIT	14	3	46	108	2.3	12	0	9	117	13.0	43	1
1966	PIT	14	3	46	114	2.5	19	2	4	93	**23.3**	**66**	1
1967	PIT	11	6	90	293	3.3	24	0	4	23	5.8	13	0
1968	ATL	12	7	94	365	3.9	**60**	2	15	127	8.5	31	0
1969	ATL	14	14	163	**655**	**4.0**	39	**3**	17	**297**	17.5	65	**2**
1970	ATL	14	12	166	636	3.8	33	0	**24**	151	6.3	25	1
1971	ATL	13	13	**186**	594	3.2	19	2	15	143	9.5	27	**2**
1972	STL	5	0	6	3	0.5	5	0	1	8	8.0	8	0
		97	58	797	2,768	3.5	60	9	89	959	10.8	66	7
