= Columbia Helicopters =

US aircraft manufacturing and operator company

Columbia Helicopters, Inc
- Type: Private
- Industry: Aerospace
- Founded: 1957; 69 years ago, in Portland, Oregon
- Headquarters: Aurora, Oregon, U.S.
- Key people: Wes Lematta, founder; Stan Wilson, Chairman of the Board; Steve Bandy, former President & CEO; Michael Tremlett, current President & CEO
- Products: Commercial helicopters
- Subsidiaries: Helifor; Columbia Helicopters, New Zealand, LTD
- Website: www.colheli.com

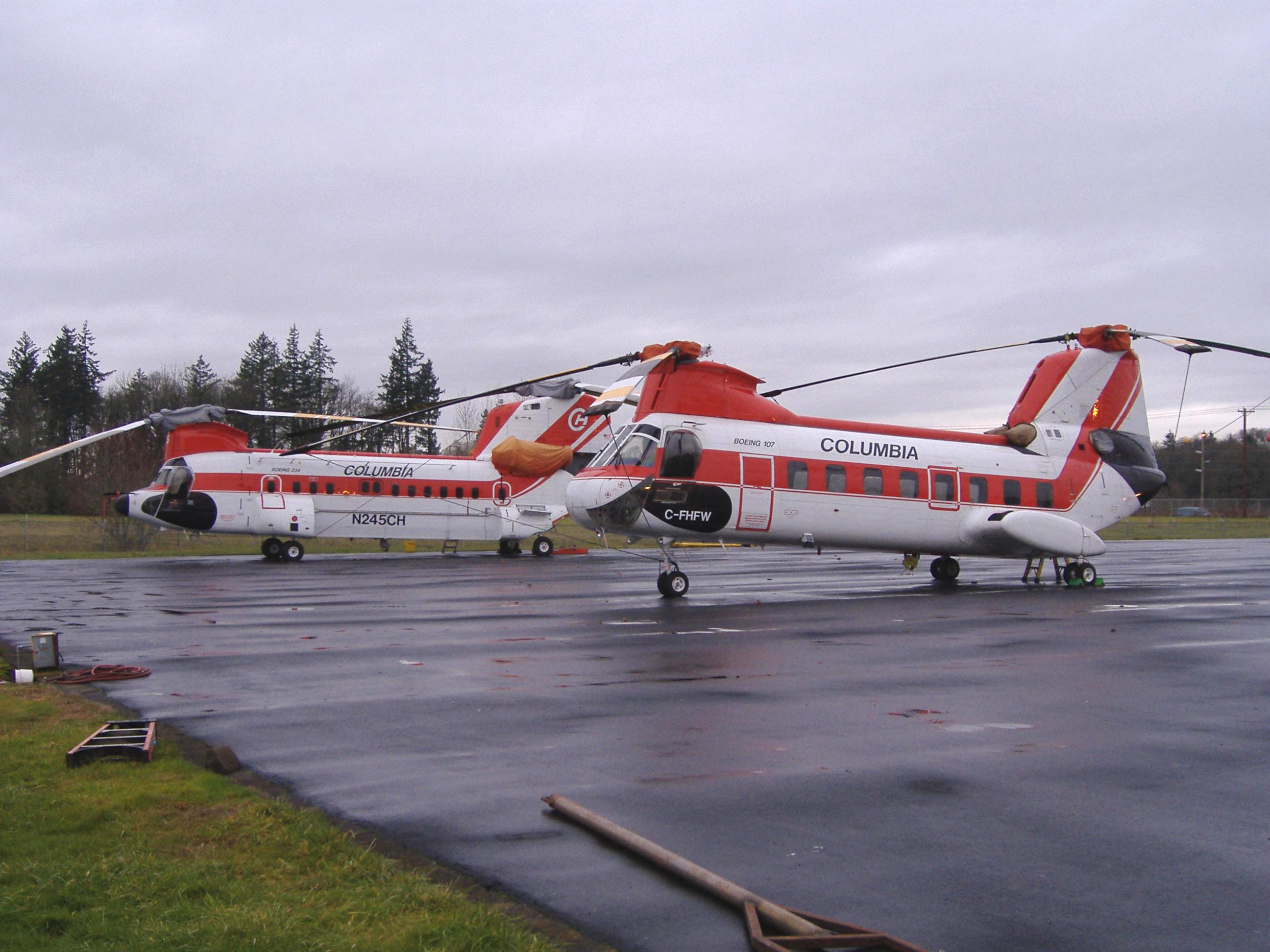
Columbia Helicopters Boeing 234 N245CH (left) and Boeing Vertol 107 C-FHFW (right) rest on the company pad in Aurora, Oregon

Columbia Helicopters, Incorporated (CHI) is an aircraft operator and repair station company based in Aurora, Oregon, United States. It is known for operating tandem rotor helicopters; in present times, exclusively the Boeing Vertol 107 and Boeing Vertol 234. These helicopters are used in stream restoration and forestry, including heli-logging, aerial firefighting, oil exploration, construction, government support, film production, disaster response, and many other activities. In addition, the company operates a large FAA repair station supporting customers worldwide.

== History ==
=== Founding and early days ===
Columbia Helicopters was founded on April 24, 1957, by Wes Lematta with a single Hiller 12B helicopter. With help from his brothers, he supported his young company with many odd jobs, such as carrying Santa Claus to trapeze acts. He performed most of his flying on the weekends while still working as a truck driver during the week.

Lematta gained notoriety on September 15, 1957, by rescuing 15 sailors from a sinking dredge near Coos Bay, Oregon. For his actions, the U.S. Army Corps of Engineers awarded him the Army Air Medal.

=== Direct Visual Operational Control ===
After purchasing the more powerful Hiller 12E, Lematta began to operate more lift jobs. One of these large jobs was working on the John Day Dam on his company's namesake, the Columbia River. Here Lematta began performing precision lift jobs by using a longer-than-average cable. The concept was that the pilot could lean out the side of the aircraft and see directly where the load would be placed rather than relying on visual instructions from the ground crew or a mirror. A few years later, Wes' brother, Jim, was flying a Sikorsky S-61 in the Colorado Rockies. He was so cold that he was forced to land. Columbia developed the first pilot bubble window to fill the need for an enclosed cockpit.

=== "First in Heli-Logging" ===
Jack Erickson, of Erickson Air-Crane fame, and Lematta were able to demonstrate the first financially successful run of helicopter logging, or "heli-logging", in 1971. This was done with Lematta's Sikorsky S-61 registration number N318Y on a U.S. Forest Service log sale near Taylorsville, California, in the Plumas National Forest. The following year, the 107s were used. Since the project used Lematta's helicopter and Erickson had purchased the timber, both Columbia Helicopters and Erikson's Air-Crane claim to be the first successful "heli-loggers". Another unusual feat was pulling a hoverbarge on snow, ice, and water in 1982.

=== Operations in Turkey ===
In 2021, Columbia Helicopters began providing Chinook Model 234 helicopters for firefighting efforts in Turkey, through CMC Savunma Sanayi A.S., a contractor for the Turkey General Directorate of Forestry. As of August 2025, Columbia Helicopters is providing 4 helicopters, along with crew and maintenance support.

=== Present Day ===
As of 2026 Columbia struggles to maintain footing in the heavy lift space. A slew of poor financial decisions, having more supervisor/director/manager roles than actual workers and back to back CEO changes did not help this.

=== Type certificates ===
As of December 15, 2006, Columbia Helicopters had purchased the type certificate of the Model 107 and Model 234 from Boeing. Currently the company is seeking FAA issuance of a production certificate (PC) to produce parts, with eventual issuance of a PC to produce both aircraft.

=== In popular media ===
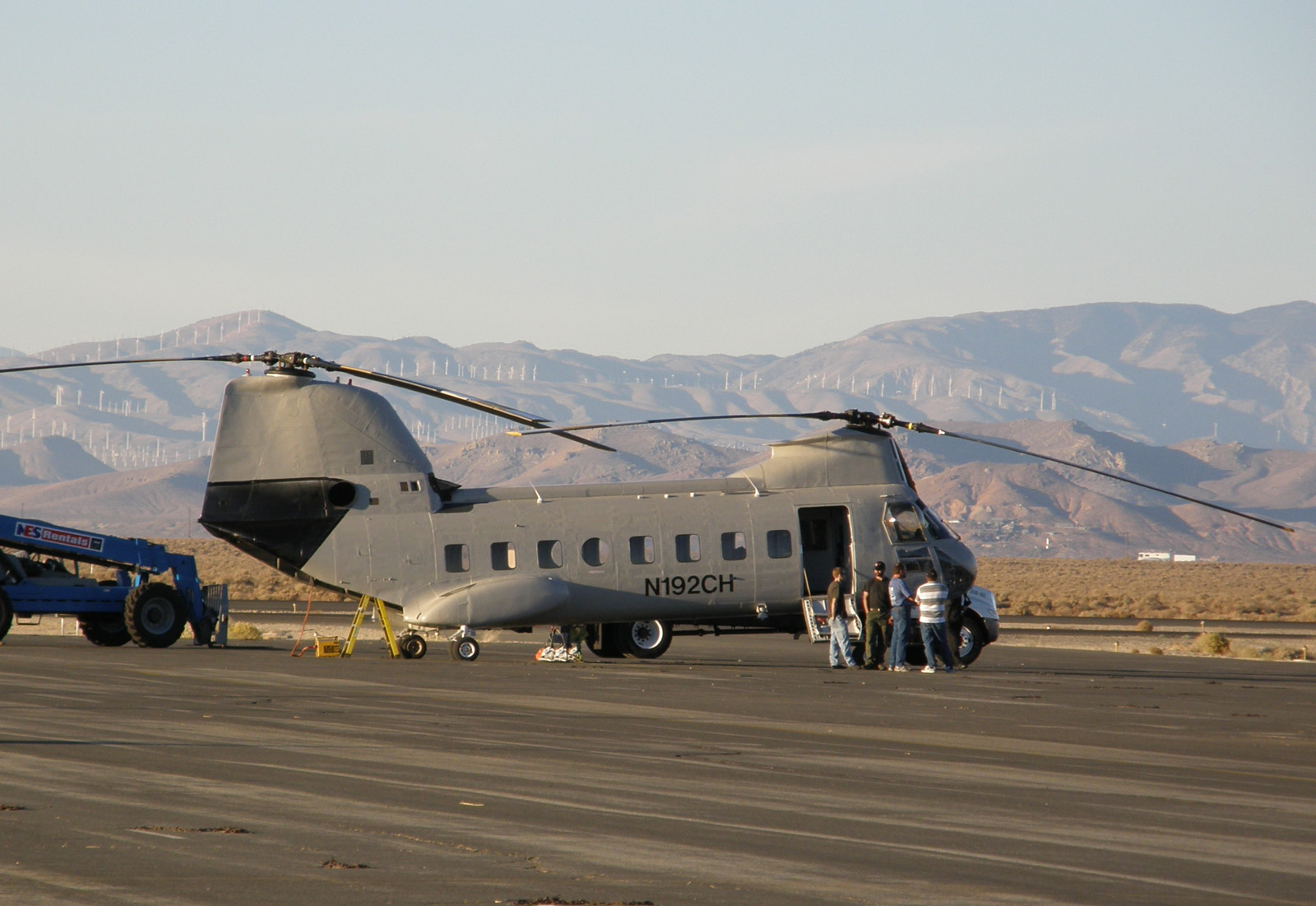
Columbia Helicopters' Kawasaki Vertol KV-107 II, painted in a special grey paint scheme, at Fox Field

Columbia Helicopters aircraft have appeared in several motion pictures:

- Coogan's Bluff
- Demolition Man - BV-234 N241CH serves as a Los Angeles Police Department helicopter.
- King Kong Lives - BV-107 N191CH, a former US Navy CH-46, carries away King Kong in his cage.
- The Lost World: Jurassic Park - BV-234 N241CH flies in a large cage to capture dinosaurs.
- More American Graffiti
- Runaway Train
- Starman - KV-107 N185CH can be seen in company colors hauling away actor Jeff Bridges' spaceship.
- Straight Up: Helicopters in Action - CHI BV-234 N239CH demonstrates the lifting capability of the Super Grapple during heli-logging operations.
- Under Siege - KV-107 N192CH flies Tommy Lee Jones' band out to the battleship.
- X2: X-Men United - KV-107 N192CH performs various flight sequences and serves in the background of several scenes.

== Fleet ==
Columbia currently operates eight Boeing-Vertol Model 234s and 14 Boeing-Vertol 107-IIs tandem rotor helicopters. Many of the latter were obtained from New York Airways. In addition to the flying fleet, in 2005, CHI purchased eight surplus Canadian Forces CH-113 Labrador helicopters for fleet expansion. For fleet support CHI operates a Beechcraft 200C Super King Air. When the 234s operate internationally, five containers are used for support tasks.

Columbia's past fleet includes the Hiller 12B, Bell 47-G2, Hiller 12E, MD 500, Sikorsky S-58, Sikorsky S-61 and Sikorsky CH-54.

In October 1991, Columbia Helicopters bought four Boeing Vertol 107II-14s from the Swedish Government, formerly operated by the Swedish Air Force as the HKP 4A.

In December 2012, Columbia bought four Boeing Vertol 107II-14s (originally Swedish Air Force HKP 4As, modified from 1988 to 1991 to Swedish Navy standards as HKP 4Ds), two Boeing Vertol 107II-15s (HKP 4Bs), and four Kawasaki KV-107IIA-16s (HKP 4Cs) from the Swedish Government, all ten formerly operated by the Swedish Navy.

In 2014, Columbia bought five US Army Chinooks for utility service, as they are not allowed to carry passengers.

== Wes Lematta Field at Aurora State Airport ==
On May 26, 2009, the Oregon State Legislature passed a resolution identifying Columbia's home airport as Wes Lematta Field at Aurora State Airport.

== See also ==
- Boeing Vertol CH-46 Sea Knight
- Boeing CH-47 Chinook
- Columbia Helicopters Heliport
- Columbia Aviation Heliport
