= North Marion High School (Oregon) =

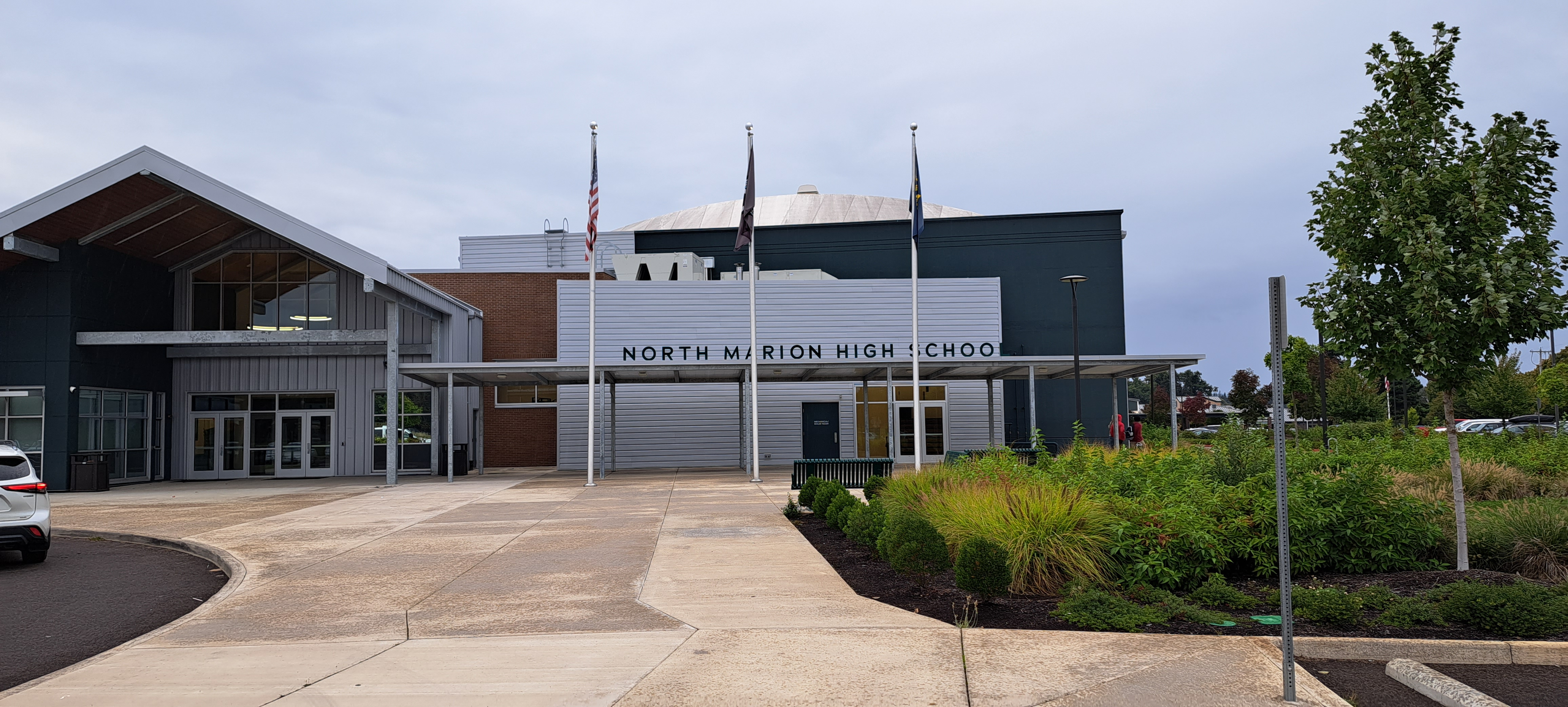

Location
- 20167 Grim Rd NE; Aurora, Marion County, Oregon 97002; United States

Information
- Type: Public
- Opened: 1950
- School district: North Marion School District
- Principal: De Ann Jeness
- Teaching staff: 34.28 (FTE)
- Grades: 9-12
- Enrollment: 564 (2024-2025)
- Student to teacher ratio: 16.45
- Campus: Rural
- Colors: Green and white
- Athletics conference: OSAA 4A-3 Oregon West Conference
- Mascot: Husky
- Team name: Huskies
- Rival: Woodburn High School
- Website: North Marion High School website

North Marion High School is a public high school in Aurora, Oregon, United States. The school is part of the North Marion School District with all four schools being located on the same campus. The school draws students from the cities of Aurora, Hubbard, and Donald as well as the communities of Broadacres and Butteville.

== New construction ==
In November 2017, voters passed a $42 million bond that would go towards renovations district-wide and would also go towards a new North Marion high school building. Construction of the new building began in 2019 and finished in 2021.

== Academics ==
The school earned a 4 (out of 5) in its report card grading for the 2013-2014 school year, meaning more than 70% of students met or exceeded standards on the Oregon Assessment of Knowledge and Skills. North Marion High School's completion rate was 94.8%, and its four-year graduation rate was 78.6%.

In 2022, 81% of the school's seniors received a high school diploma. Of 153 students, 130 graduated and 23 dropped out.

== Athletics ==
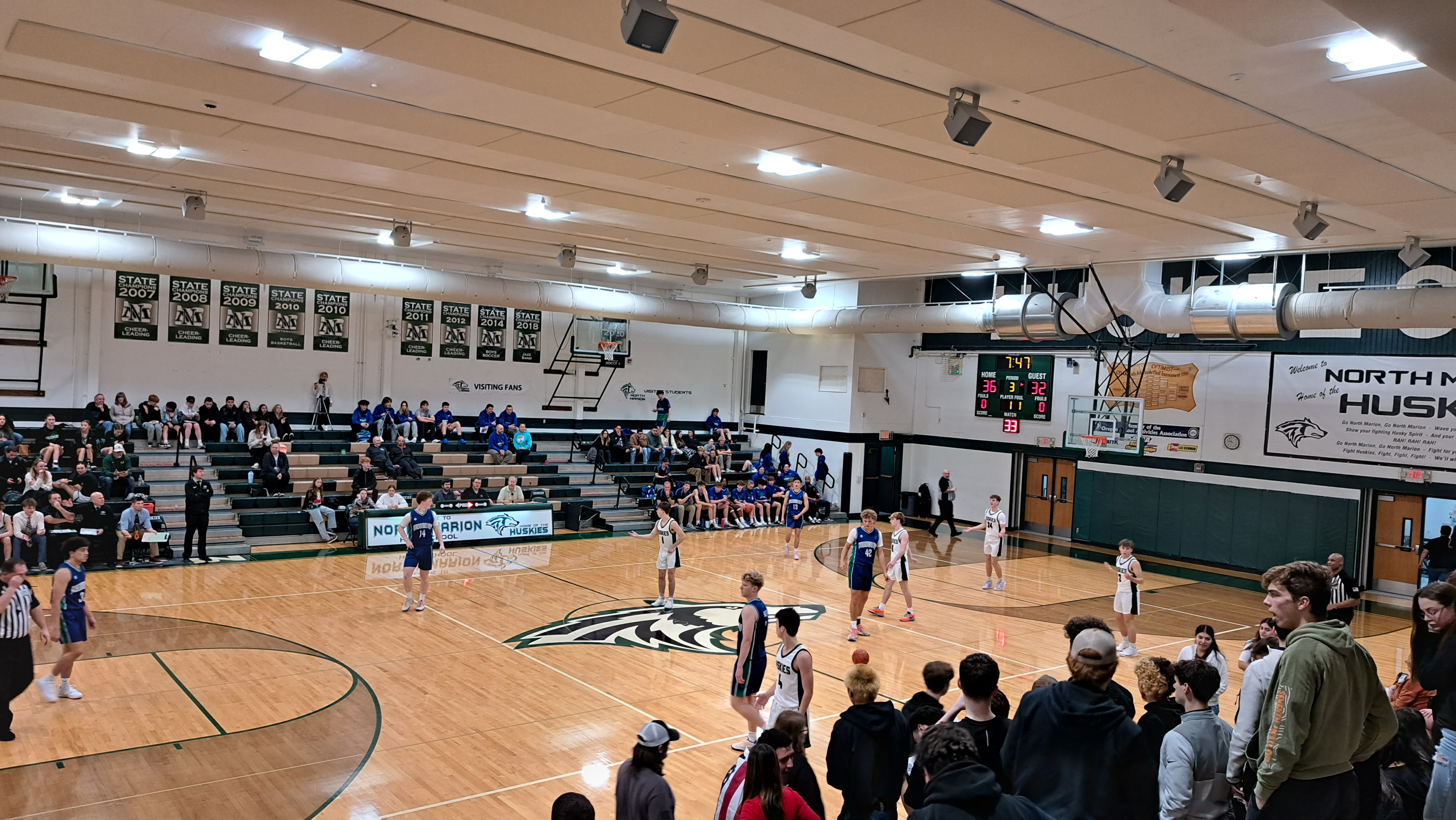
North Marion Boys Basketball competing against Modbury High School (Australian Team)

The North Marion High School athletics teams compete in the OSAA 4A-3 Oregon West Conference (excluding football which competes in 3A-SD1).

=== State championships ===
- Boys Track and Field: 1958†
- Boys Soccer: 2014
- Girls Soccer: 2020‡, 2023
- Girls Basketball: 1983
- Baseball: 1971
- Softball: 1996, 1998
- Cheerleading: 2007, 2008, 2009, 2010, 2011, 2012, 2026
- Jazz Band: 2018

(† = Tied with one or more schools) (‡ = Non-OSAA Sponsored State title)

=== Bob Brack Stadium ===
Bob Brack Stadium is the varsity baseball field located on the campus of North Marion High School, in the school's athletic complex. In 2011, it was rated "best high school baseball facility on the West Coast" by the National High School Baseball Coaches Association.

== Media coverage ==
In 2011, North Marion students founded North Marion Athletics, an organization that highlights scores, storylines, and successes in varsity sports at North Marion High School. NM Athletics remained operational until the graduation of the founders in June 2013. The student-led production was highlighted in local newspapers such as the Woodburn Independent and a Portland Metropolitan Area News Station in Fox 12 KPTV.

== Notable alumni ==
- Pat Chaffey, 1986, NFL runningback
- Kory Casto, 2000, MLB player
- Steve Schrenk, 1987, MLB player
