= Heli-logging =

Movement of felled trees using helicopters

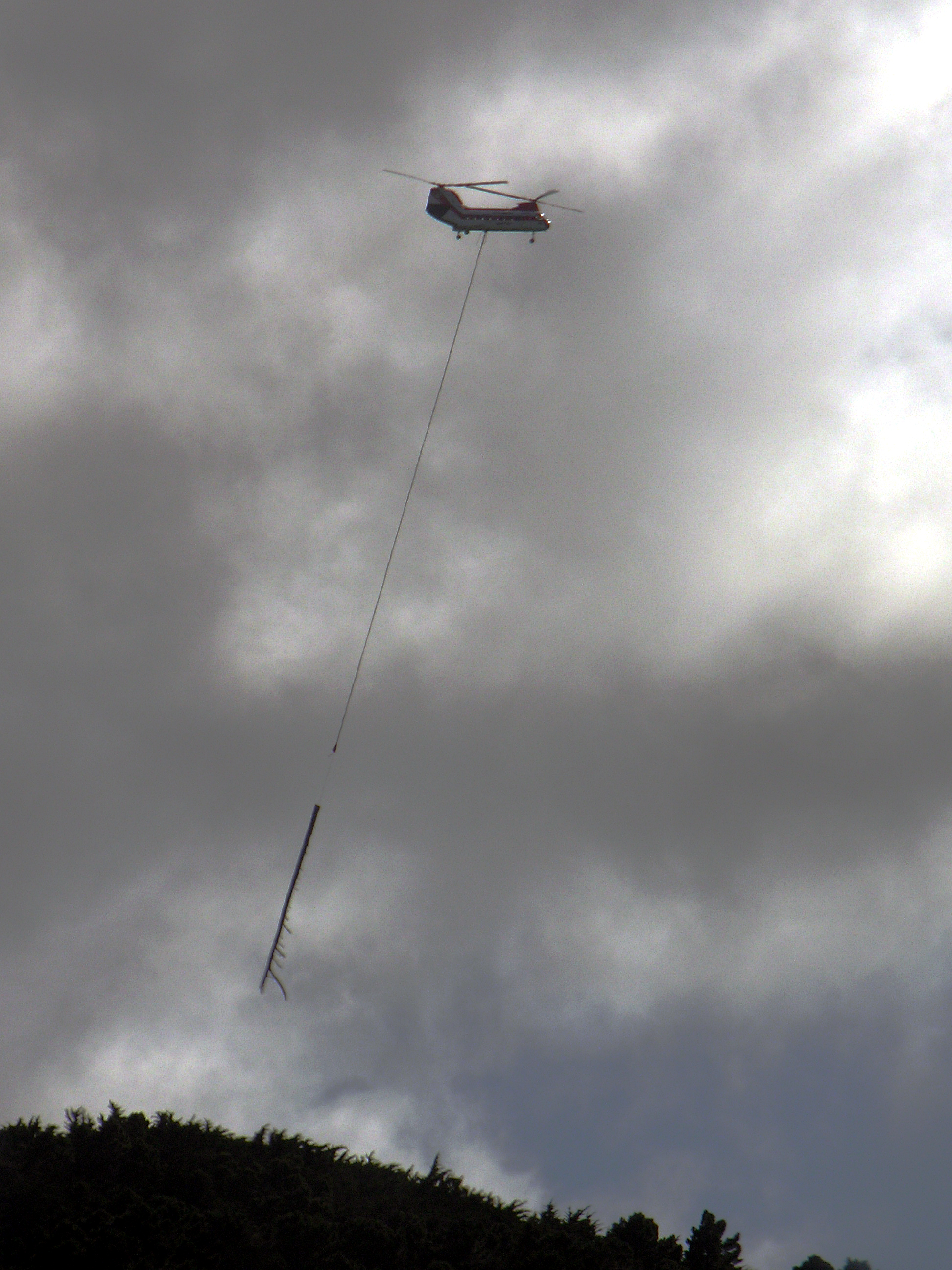
Tandem-rotor helicopter lifting a log

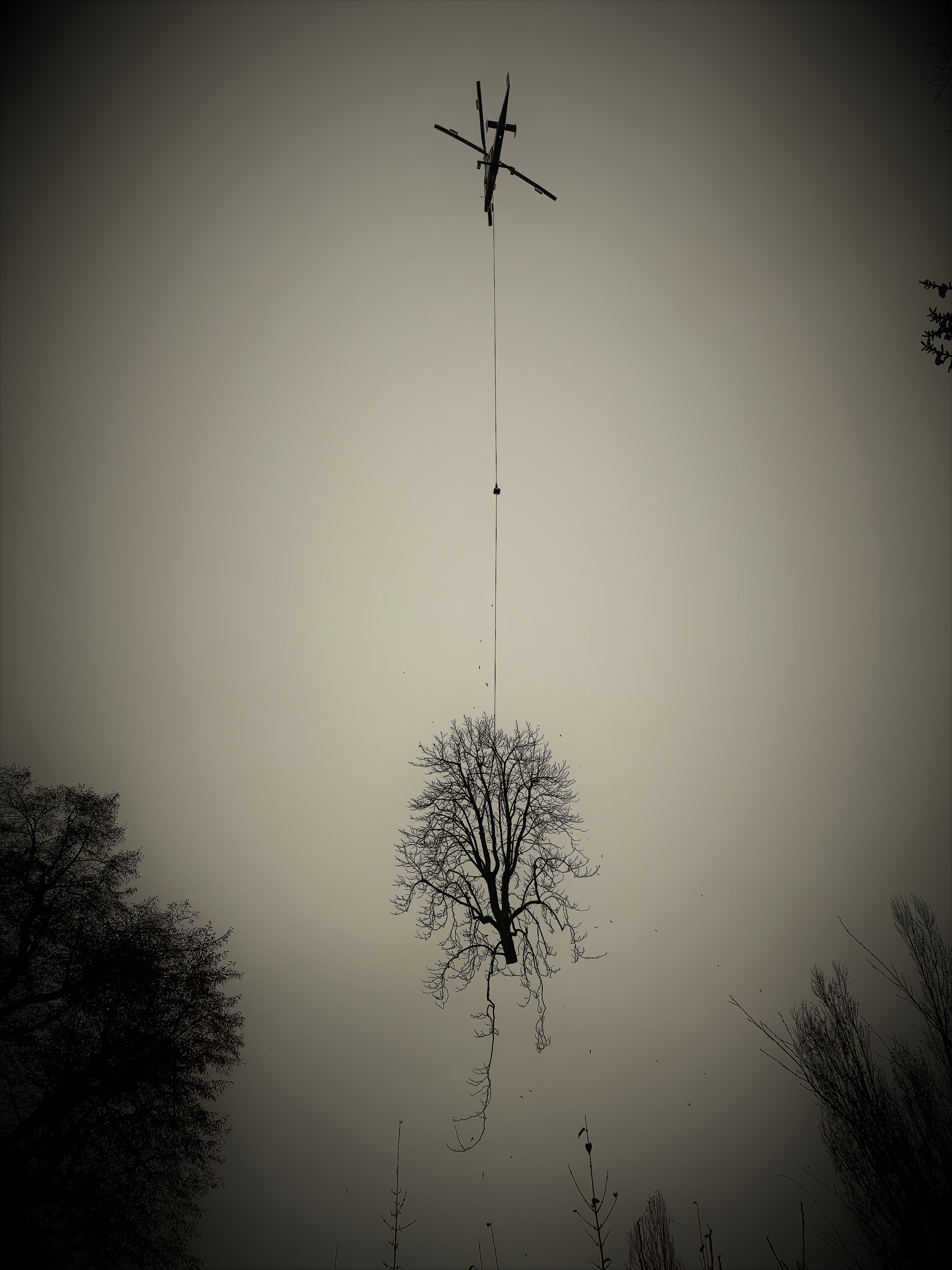
Helicopter pruning

Heli-logging, or helicopter logging, is a method of logging that uses helicopters to remove cut trees from forests by lifting them on cables attached to a helicopter. Helicopter logging is often used in inaccessible areas of forests. Because the use of helicopters reduces the level of infrastructure required to log in a specific location, the method also helps to reduce the environmental impact of logging. It also can increase productivity in these remote areas.

== History ==
After years of study by multiple helicopter manufacturers, in cooperation with the Forest Service, the first opening of timber for sale cut exclusively helicopter logging in April 1971 on the Plumas National Forest in California.

Helicopter logging in the United States started in late 1971. Jack Erickson, of Erickson Air-Crane, along with Wes Lematta of Columbia Helicopters, started heli-logging Northern California in the Plumas National Forest near Taylorsville, California.

== Process ==
Heli-logging is also known as standing stem harvesting, which is based on individual tree selection (ITS). The selection process is done by engineers and surveyors. The trees are selected based on demand for specific types and grades. Before the selection process is complete, the selected trees are bored to check their reliability. The selected trees are then marked and their diameters are recorded. The diameter of the tree is measured at 1.3 metres (4.3 ft) above the ground. The sizes of the trees that are selected are controlled by two things. The minimum size is controlled by the economy, while the maximum size is controlled by the capacity of the helicopter. Once the trees are selected they are climbed, the limbs are removed and the trees are topped. The length of the tree and the diameter at its top are then recorded. All the recorded data is then entered into a database which calculates volumes, weights, etc. The selected trees are then partially cut at the stem and supported by wooden wedges. The stem is then grappled by the helicopter and pulled until the wood breaks at the partial cut. The logged trees are then brought by helicopter to a predetermined roadside location or dropped into open water where they are collected. Some trees are felled before being de-limbed, and then picked up by the helicopter.

== Advantages ==
Heli-logging is efficient: a single S-64 Skycrane can extract 20,000 cubic metres (710,000 ft^{3}) of clean, undamaged timber per month. Conventional logging allows the stems to fall. On rocky terrains, this often results in damage to the stems that makes them unusable. On steep terrains, falling trees can slide downhill and become irretrievable. Heli-logging allows logging to take place in more remote places. It also allows certain trees to be logged that previously could not be due to their proximity to a structure or pipeline. Logging using helicopters is safer than conventional logging. Falling trees are dangerous for the loggers as well as for surrounding structures or utilities.

Helicopter logging ground crews will cut, clean, and mark the trees before the helicopter starts to work. Ground crews may be able to prepare fewer than six trees per day, and the helicopter will only be needed every few days. Since fewer roads need to be built to the site where the logging is taking place, and trees are extracted vertically, there is reduced damage to the surrounding trees and ground surface.

Research by Roberts, Ward and Rollerson done in 2004 shows that post-logging landslides are more common after conventional cable-based logging than heli-logging. Landslide rates following conventional logging are one and a half times more common than landslide rates following heli-logging.

== Disadvantages ==
Although there is no direct cost from road construction or expansion, heli-logging incurs high costs. Operation of a helicopter as well as the selection processes and methods increase the cost. The use of a helicopter to transport the stems limits the size and weight of the selected trees more than equipment would using conventional logging.
