= Bethel Historic District (Bethel, Missouri) =

Historic district in Missouri, United States

- U.S. National Register of Historic Places
- U.S. Historic district
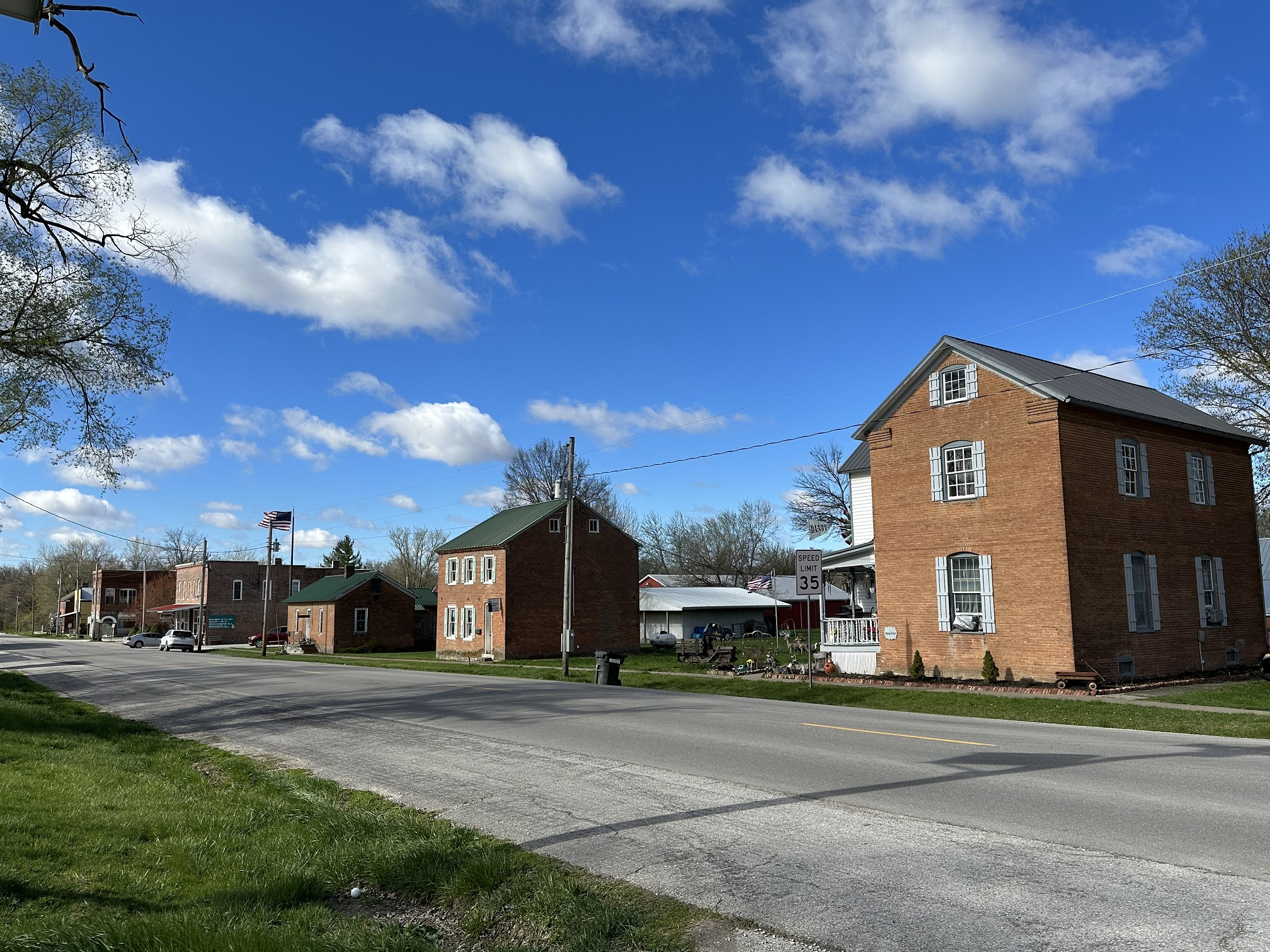

- Location within Missouri Location within the United States
- Location: Roughly bounded by Liberty, King, 1st, and 4th Sts., Bethel, Missouri
- Coordinates: 39°52′42″N 92°1′24″W
- Built: 1844
- NRHP reference No.: 70000350
- Added to NRHP: November 10, 1970

Bethel Historic District is roughly bounded by Liberty, King, 1st, and 4th Sts. in Bethel, Missouri. Construction of the town, which was for over thirty years a successful experiment in communal living, began in 1844. The leader of the community was a German emigrant, charismatic autocrat Dr. William Keil. After his death, the communal structure gradually collapsed and the communal property was split among the community members. The district was added to the National Register of Historic Places in 1970. There are twenty-six contributing properties.

== Contributing properties ==
=== Main Street, West Side ===
- The Vandiver House, which was the existing structure when the community purchased the property in 1844.
- The Blair Residence, home to the community wheel-right, a two-story, clapboard, frame house.
- A brick house, two stories tall.
- The Henry Ziegler Residence, a hip roofed, brick building, two stories tall.
- The Mose Miller Residence, a brick building, two stories tall, was the last building constructed while the town as still communally owned.
- The Nicholas Will Tailor Shop and Residence, a frame building, two stories tall.
- A Colony House, clapboard clad brick building, two stories tall.

=== Main Street, East Side ===
- Two frame dwellings, two stories tall.
- The John Bower Business District, a row of tin faced brick buildings, two stories tall.
- The Bethel Communal Men's Home, brick structure, two stories tall.
- A brick residence, two stories tall.
- The Bauer Residence, a brick building and later frame addition, two stories tall.
- The Bauer Drug and Jewelry Shop, a frame building, two stories tall.

=== King Street, West Side ===
- A Colony House and Smoke House, central stair, brick house, two stories tall.
- Brick house, frame addition, one story tall.
- The Erich Colony House, a brick home, two stories tall.
- A brick home, two stories tall.

=== King Street, East Side ===
- A Colony House, brick, two stories tall.
- The Samuel Schriber Residence, home to the community millwright, brick home and frame addition and porch.
- A Colony House, clapboard class brick, two stories tall.
- A mansard roofed brick home.

=== Liberty Street, West Side ===
- A Colony House, clapboard clad brick building, two stories tall.

=== Liberty Street, East Side ===
- The Ziegler Colony House., home to a community blacksmith, clapboard clad brick building.

=== First Street, North Side ===
- The Bethel School, brick structure, one story tall.
- A colony home, brick with additions, two stories tall.
