= William Keil =

19th century American commune organizer (1812–1877)

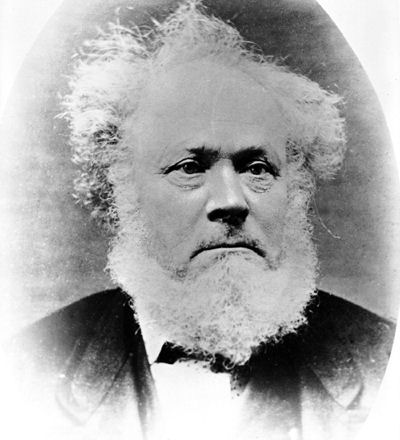
William Keil (1812–1877)

William Keil (March 6, 1812 – December 30, 1877) was the founder of 19th-century communal religious societies in Bethel, Missouri, and Aurora Colony in Oregon.

Influenced by German Lutheranism, pietism, and revival Methodism, Keil's theology was based on the principle of the Golden Rule as well as the view that people should try to share all with others by living communally (Acts 4:32-37).

Keil was born in Prussia March 6, 1812, and raised by German Lutheran parents. He emigrated to the United States as a young man—apparently after receiving a mystic text from a gypsy. Initially he settled in New York and worked as a tailor, his family trade. Within a year, he and his wife, also German, moved to western Pennsylvania, where Keil gained a reputation as a mystic and healer. By 1837, he had opened a drugstore in Pittsburgh, Pennsylvania. Keil soon heard about a group of former Harmony Society members who had left that communal group, and had moved to Phillipsburg (now Monaca, Pennsylvania), where they had tried to form the New Philadelphia Society. When Keil contacted the families in the early 1840s, he impressed some of them, and they suggested he form a communal society. As former members of such a society, they provided invaluable practical assistance to its founding and maintenance.

Keil was influenced by revivalism and utopianism, which were popular in western Pennsylvania during the 1830s. After becoming a successful Christian preacher and building a large congregation, Keil, and his followers, moved to Bethel, Missouri, in 1844 and started a Utopian commune. This colony was considered successful, but many of its members—again led by Keil—moved to Oregon between 1853 and 1856 to start a new settlement, which became known as Aurora Mills. Keil died December 30, 1877, leaving a power vacuum that led to the dissolution of the colony in 1883.

Dr. Keil led the first wagon train to the Oregon territory carrying his eldest son, Willie, in a coffin in the lead wagon. Willie died a few days before the trip was to begin and had been promised by his Father that he would go, no matter what. Willie's coffin was filled with whiskey distilled at the Bethel colony and put in the lead wagon as promised. He was buried in Washington on the original settlement that would later move and become the Aurora Colony. The burial location would become Willie Keil's Grave State Park Heritage Site.

The community at Aurora is given tribute at Twin Oaks Community, a contemporary intentional community of over 100 people in Louisa County, Virginia. All Twin Oaks' buildings are named after communities that are no longer actively functioning, and "Aurora" is the name of the visitor residence.

His house near Bethel, known as Elim, was listed on the National Register of Historic Places in 1971. Located nearby is Hebron.

== See also ==
- Aurora Colony
