= Aurora Colony =

19th century Oregon utopian commune

- Aurora Colony Historic District
- U.S. National Register of Historic Places
- U.S. Historic district
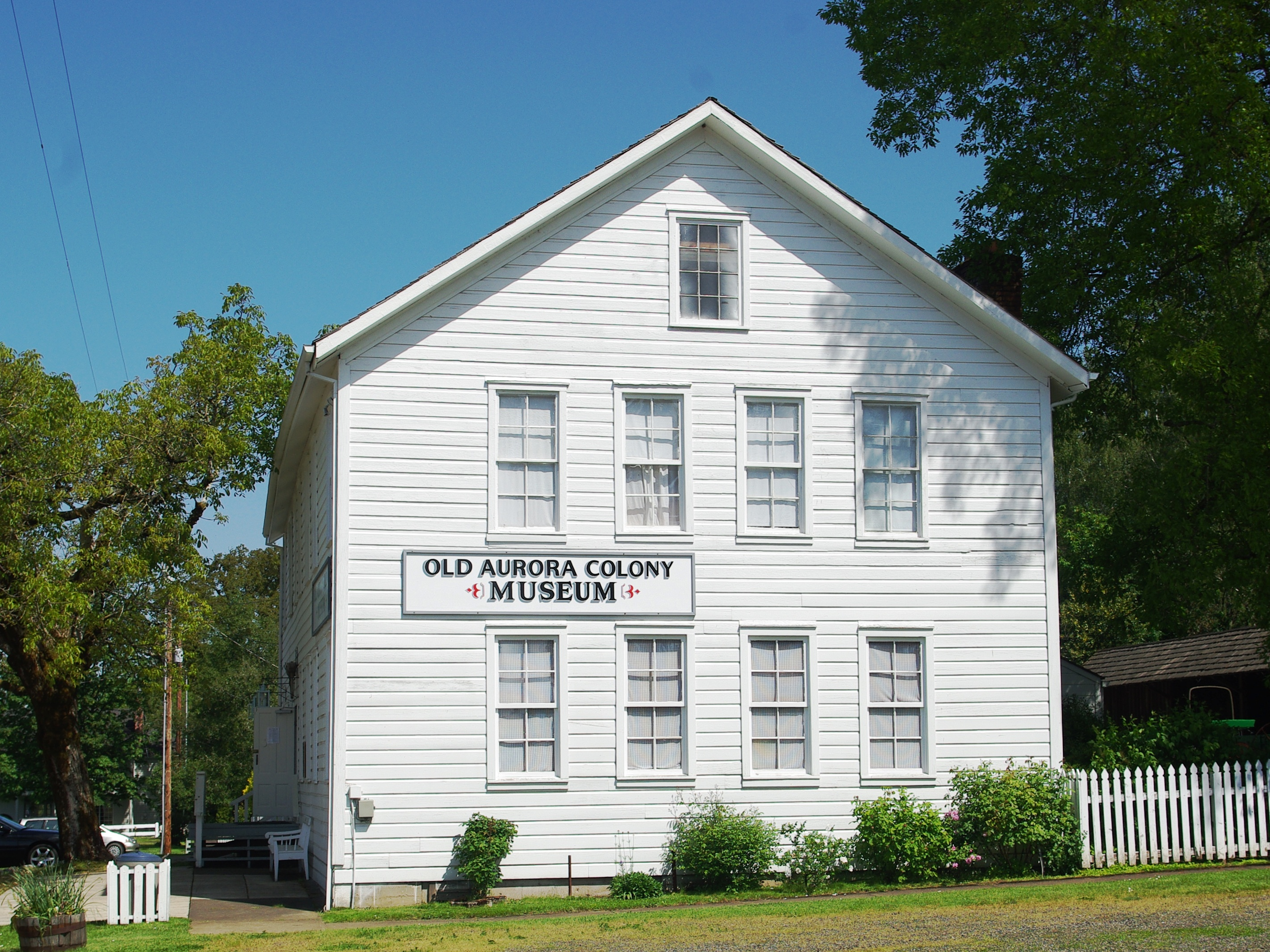
- Museum dedicated to the history of the Aurora Colony, housed in the 1880 ox barn

- Location within the United States Location within Oregon
- Location: Aurora, Oregon, US
- Coordinates: 45°13′57″N 122°45′30″W
- Area: approx. 150 acres (61 ha)
- Built: c. 1856 – c. 1881
- NRHP reference No.: 74001696
- Added to NRHP: April 16, 1974

Aurora Colony, also called Aurora Mills, was a Christian utopian communal society founded in 1856 by William Keil in modern-day Aurora, Oregon, US. At its peak in 1868, the Aurora Colony had about 600 people and 15,000 acres (6,100 ha) of land. The colony -- along with Keil's previously established Bethel colony near Shelbyville, MO -- was formally dissolved in 1883. In 1974, about 150 acres (61 ha) and 12 buildings of the former colony were inscribed on the National Register of Historic Places as parts of the Aurora Colony Historic District.

== Background ==
William Keil was a Prussian-born tailor who moved to the United States with his wife in the 1830s. He opened open a tailor shop in New York City, and studied pharmacology. He then moved to Pennsylvania and set up a drugstore and sold medicines. Around this time, he began calling himself "Dr. Keil".

In 1839, Keil became a preacher after attending a Methodist revival meeting. In Pennsylvania, he began to amass followers, including members of George Rapp's Economy Colony. In 1844 he and his followers established the Bethel community in Missouri, which at its peak had 650 members.

== Founding ==
Though Keil's community in Missouri was successful and nearly self-sufficient, he decided to expand his colony to the Pacific Northwest of the United States. In 1853, he sent a scout party to find a location for "A Second Eden".

In May 1855, Keil and several members of his Bethel colony in Missouri began the wagon journey to Washington Territory. Four days before they set out, Keil's son Willy died of malaria. Not wanting to leave his son behind, Keil put the body in a wooden, lead-lined coffin and covered it with whiskey from the Bethel Distillery to preserve it.

The group first settled at Willapa Bay, Washington. After spending the winter there, Keil decided the land was not suitable for a self-sufficient agricultural community and began searching for a new location. In 1856 he purchased land and a functioning mill south of Oregon City. He named the Colony Aurora Mills after his daughter, Aurora. The original colony contained 250 members who had left the Bethel Colony with Keil.

== Colonial life ==
The Aurora Colony built homes, schools, businesses, mills, and a hotel. The colony also created a fruit orchard and produced hand-made goods. The Oregon & California Railway line expanded to pass through Aurora in 1870, which brought additional business to the colony. The train stopped four times a day for meals in its hotel.

The Aurora Colony Band became well known on the West Coast, and traveled throughout the region to perform music.

As in many other utopian communities, its founder held special privileges. He instated confession in order to maintain the members’ humility, yet was immune from taking part in confession himself. He was also exempt from taking part in manual labor. Keil lived in a large house in the colony, called "Gross Haus" (German for Big House).

As part of keeping order and maintaining his place in the community, Keil utilized mortification functions, calling out deviants for their transgressions during public meetings.

=== Smallpox outbreak ===
In 1862, a member of the colony took care of an individual outside the colony who had smallpox and brought it back to the Aurora Colony. As a result, many in Aurora contracted the disease and many died. Four of Keil's children died in the outbreak, including his daughter Aurora, the colony's namesake.

== Dissolution of the colony ==
Keil had held all the communal property in his name. In 1872, after the death of his only remaining daughter, Keil began to transfer ownership of colony land to individual families in the community and intended to transfer more later. However, by the time he died suddenly on December 30, 1877, he had not made any additional transfers.

It was decided to dissolve the two colonies, and the dissolution was formally declared on January 22, 1883. The land was later incorporated and became the modern-day city of Aurora, Oregon.

== Legacy ==
In 1966 the Old Aurora Colony Museum was established, dedicated to maintaining the history of the colony. In 1974, twenty sites in Aurora were added to the National Register of Historical Places.

=== In media ===
Author Jane Kirkpatrick wrote a trilogy of novels about the experience of Emma Wagner Giesy, the only female member of Keil's scout party to find a location for a new colony in the Pacific Northwest that eventually became the Aurora Colony. The three novels in Kirkpatrick's series are "A Clearing in the Wild" (2006), "A Tendering In the Storm" (2007), and "Mending at the Edge" (2008).

== See also ==
- List of American Utopian communities
- New Odessa
- National Register of Historic Places listings in Marion County, Oregon
