= Ron C. Smith =

American football player (born 1942)

No. 14, 10
- Position: Quarterback

Personal information
- Born: June 27, 1942 (age 84); Richmond, Virginia, U.S.
- Listed height: 6 ft 5 in (1.96 m)
- Listed weight: 220 lb (100 kg)

Career information
- High school: Varina (VA)
- College: Wake Forest; Richmond
- NFL draft: 1964: 10th round, 131st overall pick
- AFL draft: 1964: 23rd round, 184th overall pick

Career history
- Los Angeles Rams (1965); Pittsburgh Steelers (1966)

Career NFL statistics
- Passing attempts: 181
- Passing completions: 79
- Completion percentage: 43.6%
- TD–INT: 8–12
- Passing yards: 1,249
- Passer rating: 54.3
- Stats at Pro Football Reference

Ronald Christopher Smith (born June 27, 1942) is an American former professional football player who was a quarterback in the National Football League (NFL). He played college football for the Wake Forest Demon Deacons. Smith played in the NFL for nine games with the Pittsburgh Steelers in 1966, and one for the Los Angeles Rams in 1965. The Rams traded Smith to the Green Bay Packers, who traded him to the Steelers on August 31, 1966.
