= North Marion School District =

School district in Oregon, United States

North Marion School District is a public school district in Marion County, Oregon, United States that serves the cities of Aurora, Donald, and Hubbard and the communities of Broadacres and Butteville. There are about 1983 students enrolled in the district's four schools, which are all located on a single campus in Aurora. The superintendent is Ginger Redlinger.

== Demographics ==
In the 2009 school year, the district had 30 students classified as homeless by the Department of Education, or 1.6% of students in the district.

== Schools ==
=== North Marion High School ===
As of 2022, North Marion High School has an enrollment of 599 9th- to 12th-grade students. The principal is DeAnn Jenness.

=== North Marion Middle School ===
As of 2022, North Marion Middle School had an enrollment of 470 6th- to 8th-grade students. The Principal of Operations is Stacy Erickson.

=== North Marion Intermediate School ===
As of 2022, North Marion Intermediate School had an enrollment of 396 3rd- to 5th-grade students. The Principal is David Sheldon.

=== North Marion Primary School ===
As of 2022, North Marion Primary School had an enrollment of 311 preschool to 2nd grade students. The Principal is Kimberly Jordan.
