= Aurora State Airport =

Aurora State Airport Wes Lematta Field Aurora Flight Strip
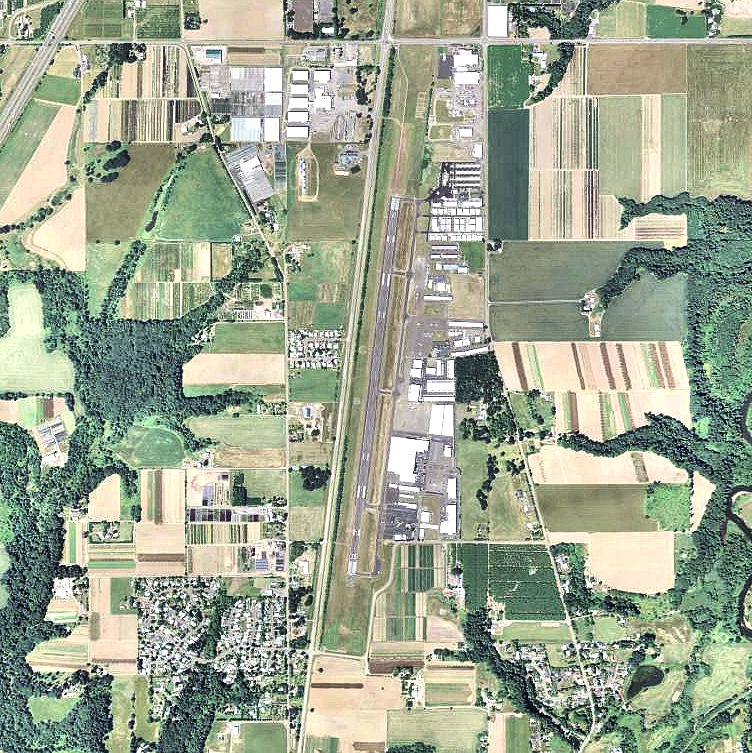
- 2006 USGS orthophoto
- IATA: none; ICAO: KUAO; FAA LID: UAO

Summary
- Airport type: Public
- Operator: Oregon Department of Aviation
- Serves: Aurora, Oregon
- Location: Marion County, near Aurora, Oregon
- Elevation AMSL: 200 ft (61 m)
- Coordinates: 45°14′50″N 122°46′12″W

Map
- Location of Aurora State Airport

Runways
| Direction | Length | | Surface |
| Direction | ft | m | Surface |
|---|---|---|---|
| 17/35 | 5,003 | 1,525 | Asphalt |

Statistics (2021)
- Aircraft operations (year ending September 27, 2021): 94,935
- Based aircraft: 271
- Source: Federal Aviation Administration

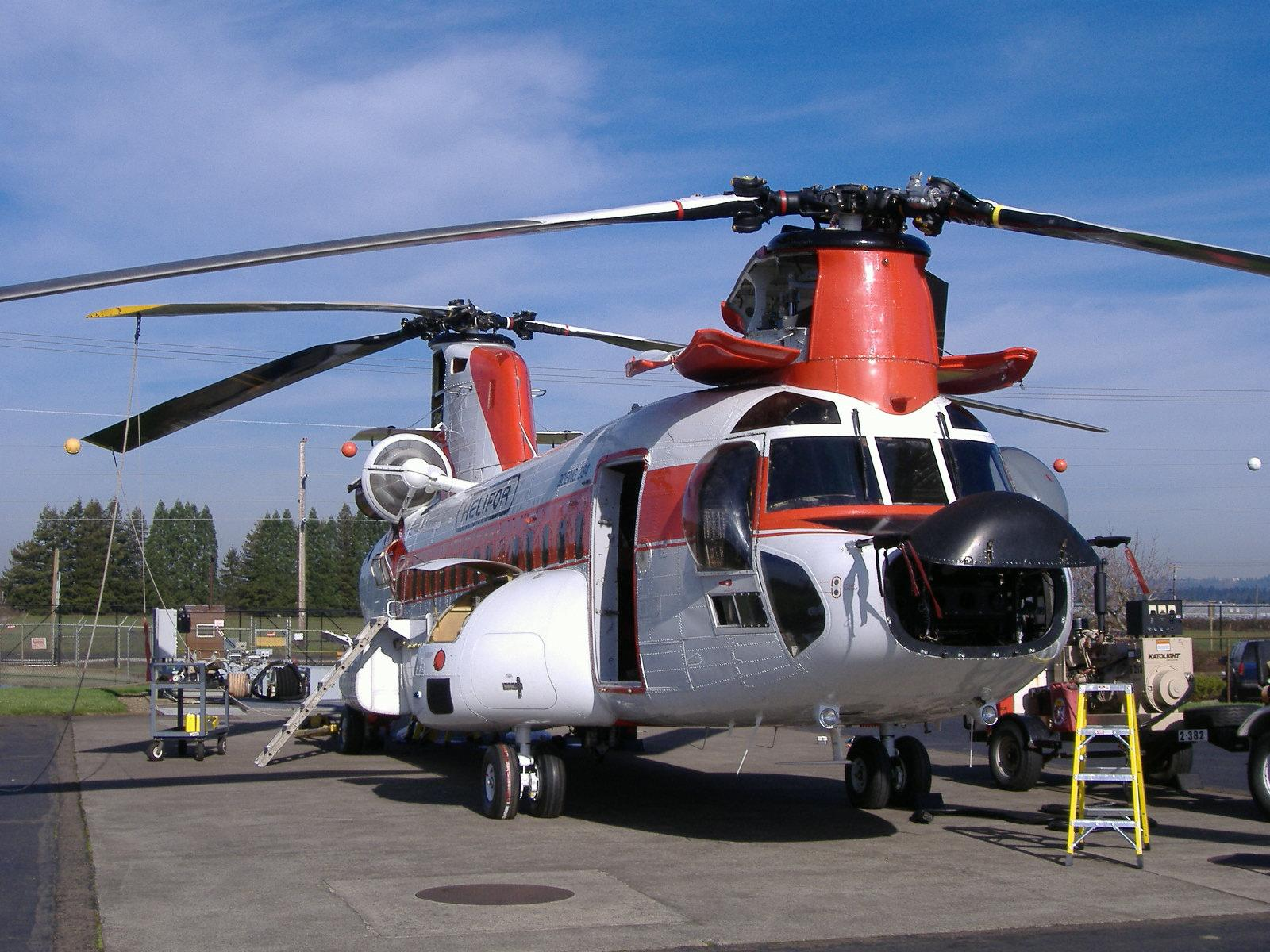
Boeing Vertol 234 C-FHFB (cn MJ005) during inspection at Columbia Helicopters Heliport adjacent to Aurora State Airport

Aurora State Airport (ICAO: KUAO, FAA LID: UAO) is a public airport located one mile (2 km) northwest of the central business district of Aurora, a city in Marion County, Oregon, United States. It is owned by the Oregon Department of Aviation.

Although most U.S. airports use the same three-letter location identifier for the FAA and IATA, Aurora State Airport is assigned UAO by the FAA but has no designation from the IATA.

Primarily a general aviation airport, Aurora has significant business aviation based at the field. In addition the airport serves as the home to two major aviation companies Van's Aircraft and Columbia Helicopters.

On May 26, 2009, the Oregon State Legislature passed a resolution identifying the airport as Wes Lematta Field at Aurora State Airport. The late Wes Lematta was the founder of Columbia Helicopters located on the northeastern corner of the field.

== Facilities and aircraft ==
Aurora State Airport covers an area of 144 acres (58 ha) which contains one asphalt paved runway (17/35) measuring 5,004 x 100 ft (1,525 x 30 m). For the 12-month period ending September 27, 2021, the airport had 94,935 aircraft operations, an average of 260 per day: 91% general aviation, 8% air taxi and <1% military. There was at the time 271 aircraft based at this airport: 208 single engine, 15 multi-engine, 35 jet aircraft, 9 helicopters, 3 gliders, and 1 ultra-light.

Three fixed-base operators operate at the field: Aurora Aviation, Atlantic FBO Network, and Willamette Aviation. Aurora Flight Training and Willamette Aviation provide flight instruction, aircraft rentals, and aircraft sales, while Atlantic FBO Network primarily provides aircraft refueling services, hangars for corporate aircraft, and an executive lounge for private and corporate jet operations. Willamette Aviation also provides self service 100LL fuel (located at the end of runway 17).

Due to increased flight activity and its location in the busy airspace corridor between Salem McNary Field and Portland International Airport, an air traffic control (ATC) tower was constructed and opened in late 2015. In addition, the airspace class designation at UAO was changed to "Class D" airspace.

Adjacent to the airport are the Columbia Aviation Heliport and Columbia Helicopters Heliport.

== History ==
The airport was built by the United States Army Air Forces in 1943, and was known as Aurora Flight Strip. It was an outlying (supporting) airfield to Portland Army Air Base for military aircraft on training flights. It was closed after World War II, and was turned over for state government use by the War Assets Administration (WAA).

== See also ==
- Life Flight Network
- Oregon World War II Army Airfields
