= Aurora, Oregon =

- City
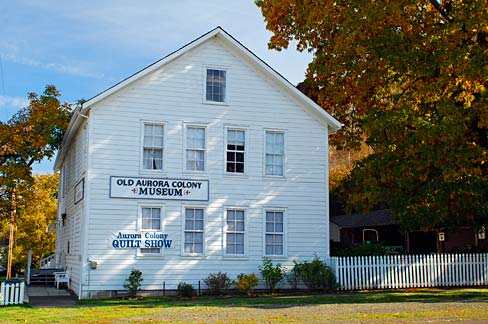
- Old Aurora Colony Museum

- Seal

- Location in Oregon
- Coordinates: 45°13′40″N 122°45′19″W
- Country: United States
- State: Oregon
- County: Marion
- Incorporated: 1893

Government
  - Mayor: Brian Asher

Area
  - Total: 0.48 sq mi (1.25 km^{2})
  - Land: 0.48 sq mi (1.25 km^{2})
  - Water: 0 sq mi (0.00 km^{2})
- Elevation: 167 ft (51 m)

Population (2020)
  - Total: 1,133
  - Density: 2,339.1/sq mi (903.15/km^{2})
- Time zone: UTC-8 (Pacific)
  - Summer (DST): UTC-7 (Pacific)
- ZIP code: 97002
- Area code: 503
- FIPS code: 41-03300
- GNIS feature ID: 2409758
- Website: www.ci.aurora.or.us

Aurora is a city in Marion County, Oregon, United States. The population was 1,133 at the 2020 census, up from 918 in 2010. It is part of the Salem Metropolitan Statistical Area.

== History ==
Before being incorporated as a city, the area was the location of the Aurora Colony, a religious commune founded in 1856 by William Keil and John E. Schmit. Keil named the settlement after his daughter.

== Geography ==
Aurora is in northern Marion County, bordered to the east by the Pudding River, which forms the boundary with Clackamas County. Oregon Route 99E passes through the center of town, leading northeast 4 miles (6 km) to Canby and southwest 8 miles (13 km) to Woodburn. The cities of Portland and Salem are 22 miles (35 km) to the north and 25 miles (40 km) to the southwest, respectively.

According to the U.S. Census Bureau, Aurora has a total area of 0.48 square miles (1.24 km^{2}), all land. The Pudding River runs along Aurora's eastern boundary and flows north to the Molalla River, shortly before the Molalla joins the Willamette River north of Canby.

=== Climate ===
This region experiences warm (but not hot) and dry summers, with no average monthly temperatures above 71.6 °F (22.0 °C). According to the Köppen Climate Classification system, Aurora has a warm-summer Mediterranean climate, abbreviated "Csb" on climate maps.

Climate data for Aurora State Airport (1991–2020 normals, extremes 1997–present)
Month	Jan	Feb	Mar	Apr	May	Jun	Jul	Aug	Sep	Oct	Nov	Dec	Year
Record high °F (°C)	65 (18)	69 (21)	79 (26)	89 (32)	99 (37)	114 (46)	108 (42)	106 (41)	100 (38)	90 (32)	75 (24)	67 (19)	114 (46)
Mean maximum °F (°C)	58.1 (14.5)	61.2 (16.2)	70.0 (21.1)	79.6 (26.4)	87.4 (30.8)	91.0 (32.8)	97.0 (36.1)	97.8 (36.6)	92.7 (33.7)	77.7 (25.4)	64.7 (18.2)	58.5 (14.7)	100.3 (37.9)
Mean daily maximum °F (°C)	48.5 (9.2)	52.5 (11.4)	57.1 (13.9)	62.0 (16.7)	69.2 (20.7)	74.5 (23.6)	83.1 (28.4)	83.3 (28.5)	77.4 (25.2)	64.3 (17.9)	53.7 (12.1)	47.6 (8.7)	64.4 (18.0)
Daily mean °F (°C)	42.4 (5.8)	44.7 (7.1)	48.3 (9.1)	52.3 (11.3)	58.7 (14.8)	63.4 (17.4)	69.6 (20.9)	69.8 (21.0)	64.8 (18.2)	54.9 (12.7)	46.7 (8.2)	41.8 (5.4)	54.8 (12.7)
Mean daily minimum °F (°C)	36.3 (2.4)	37.0 (2.8)	39.4 (4.1)	42.6 (5.9)	48.3 (9.1)	52.3 (11.3)	56.1 (13.4)	56.3 (13.5)	52.2 (11.2)	45.5 (7.5)	39.7 (4.3)	35.9 (2.2)	45.1 (7.3)
Mean minimum °F (°C)	24.9 (−3.9)	26.4 (−3.1)	29.8 (−1.2)	33.2 (0.7)	37.7 (3.2)	44.4 (6.9)	49.0 (9.4)	49.0 (9.4)	42.5 (5.8)	33.8 (1.0)	27.2 (−2.7)	23.1 (−4.9)	20.2 (−6.6)
Record low °F (°C)	16 (−9)	19 (−7)	25 (−4)	29 (−2)	33 (1)	41 (5)	45 (7)	44 (7)	36 (2)	26 (−3)	17 (−8)	10 (−12)	10 (−12)
Average precipitation inches (mm)	5.48 (139)	4.03 (102)	4.39 (112)	3.37 (86)	2.55 (65)	1.47 (37)	0.43 (11)	0.52 (13)	1.58 (40)	3.70 (94)	5.80 (147)	6.23 (158)	39.55 (1,005)
Average precipitation days (≥ 0.01 in)	20.3	17.4	19.2	16.7	13.3	8.7	3.0	3.5	7.6	15.3	20.3	20.2	165.5
Source: NOAA

== Demographics ==
Historical population
Census	Pop.	Note	%±
1900	122		—
1910	190		55.7%
1920	229		20.5%
1930	215		−6.1%
1940	228		6.0%
1950	242		6.1%
1960	274		13.2%
1970	306		11.7%
1980	523		70.9%
1990	567		8.4%
2000	655		15.5%
2010	918		40.2%
2020	1,133		23.4%
U.S. Decennial Census

=== 2020 census ===
As of the 2020 census, Aurora had a population of 1,133. The median age was 46.0 years; 6.7% of residents were under the age of 5, 20.6% of residents were under the age of 18, and 21.8% were 65 years of age or older. For every 100 females there were 99.8 males, and for every 100 females age 18 and over there were 96.1 males age 18 and over.

100.0% of residents lived in urban areas, while 0% lived in rural areas.

There were 431 households in Aurora, of which 31.6% had children under the age of 18 living in them. Of all households, 63.6% were married-couple households, 9.0% were households with a male householder and no spouse or partner present, and 19.0% were households with a female householder and no spouse or partner present. About 16.0% of all households were made up of individuals and 8.4% had someone living alone who was 65 years of age or older. The average household size was 2.74 and the average family size was 3.00, and 2.3% of households were cohabitating couples.

There were 431 housing units, of which 0% were vacant. Among occupied housing units, 83.1% were owner-occupied and 16.9% were renter-occupied. The homeowner vacancy rate was <0.1% and the rental vacancy rate was <0.1%.

Racial composition as of the 2020 census
Race	Number	Percent
White	899	79.3%
Black or African American	15	1.3%
American Indian and Alaska Native	17	1.5%
Asian	11	1.0%
Native Hawaiian and Other Pacific Islander	3	0.3%
Some other race	80	7.1%
Two or more races	108	9.5%
Hispanic or Latino (of any race)	186	16.4%

=== 2010 census ===
As of the census of 2010, there were 918 people, 336 households, and 256 families living in the city. The population density was 1,912.5 inhabitants per square mile (738.4/km^{2}). There were 349 housing units at an average density of 727.1 per square mile (280.7/km^{2}). The racial makeup of the city was 89.7% White, 0.5% African American, 0.9% Native American, 0.3% Asian, 6.3% from other races, and 2.3% from two or more races. Hispanic or Latino of any race were 10.9% of the population.

There were 336 households, of which 37.5% had children under the age of 18 living with them, 64.0% were married couples living together, 7.4% had a female householder with no husband present, 4.8% had a male householder with no wife present, and 23.8% were non-families. 18.5% of all households were made up of individuals, and 6.6% had someone living alone who was 65 years of age or older. The average household size was 2.73 and the average family size was 3.12.

The median age in the city was 39.6 years. 27.8% of residents were under the age of 18; 5.2% were between the ages of 18 and 24; 24.5% were from 25 to 44; 31.8% were from 45 to 64; and 10.8% were 65 years of age or older. The gender makeup of the city was 51.6% male and 48.4% female.

=== 2000 census ===
As of the census of 2000, there were 655 people, 250 households, and 186 families living in the city. The population density was 1,441.8 inhabitants per square mile (556.7/km^{2}). There were 262 housing units at an average density of 576.7 per square mile (222.7/km^{2}). The racial makeup of the city was 94.20% White, 0.46% African American, 0.61% Native American, 1.07% Asian, 1.98% from other races, and 1.68% from two or more races. Hispanic or Latino of any race were 6.26% of the population.

There were 250 households, out of which 31.6% had children under the age of 18 living with them, 62.4% were married couples living together, 7.2% had a female householder with no husband present, and 25.6% were non-families. 19.6% of all households were made up of individuals, and 9.2% had someone living alone who was 65 years of age or older. The average household size was 2.62 and the average family size was 3.01.

In the city, the population was spread out, with 24.4% under the age of 18, 7.0% from 18 to 24, 27.8% from 25 to 44, 27.6% from 45 to 64, and 13.1% who were 65 years of age or older. The median age was 41 years. For every 100 females, there were 105.3 males. For every 100 females age 18 and over, there were 98.0 males.

The median income for a household in the city was $55,938, and the median income for a family was $65,556. Males had a median income of $45,938 versus $29,444 for females. The per capita income for the city was $24,839. None of the families and 1.6% of the population were living below the poverty line, including no under eighteens and 7.5% of those over 64.

== Education ==
North Marion School District has a school system with four schools within walking distance: North Marion Primary School, North Marion Intermediate School, North Marion Middle School, and North Marion High School.

== Places of interest ==
- Old Aurora Museum, about the Old Aurora Colony.
- Aurora Mills Architectural Salvage, set in the town's historic seed cleaning mill complex built in 1890, is now the town's largest antique shopping venue.
- Mainstreet Mercantile Antiques, one of the town's larger antique shops.

== Transportation ==
=== Airport ===
The Aurora State Airport is located one mile (1.6 km) northwest of Aurora. The airport is owned by the State of Oregon and operated by the Oregon Department of Aviation.

== Economy ==
Life Flight Network, the nation's largest not-for-profit air ambulance provider is headquartered at the Aurora State Airport. The company provides critical care transport from the scene of an emergency or from one hospital to another via helicopter and fixed-wing aircraft. They also provide emergent and non-emergent ground ambulance services. Life Flight Network has bases of operation throughout Oregon, Washington, Idaho, and Montana and has been saving lives in the region since 1978. The company employs approximately 900 people. Columbia Helicopters is also located in Aurora. The facility provides maintenance, repair, and overhaul services.
