= Woodburn High School =

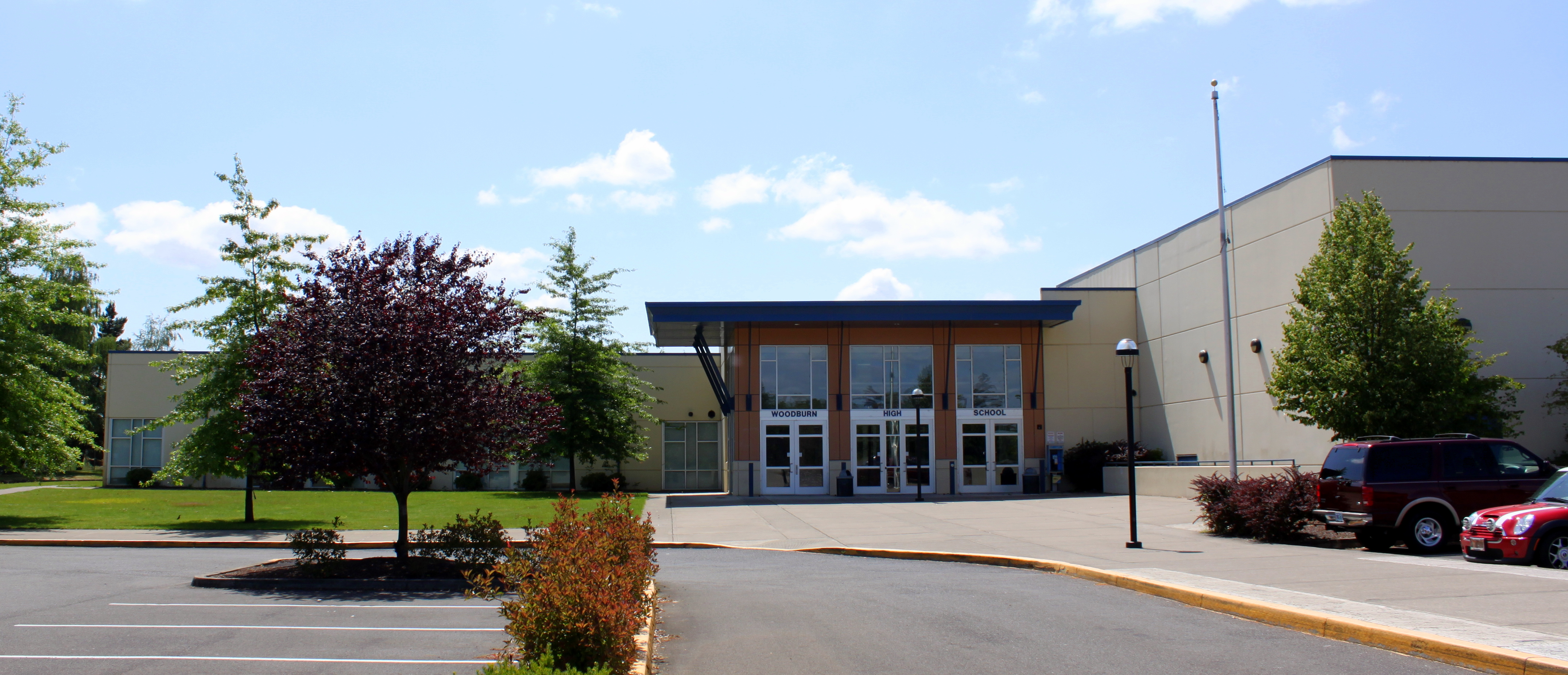

Location
- 1785 N Front Street; Woodburn, (Marion County), Oregon 97071; United States; 45.1534422°N 122.8503993°W

Information
- Type: Public
- School district: Woodburn School District 103
- Principal: Dulce Nash
- Grades: 9-12
- Enrollment: 1,701 (2023-2024)
- Colors: Royal blue and white
- Athletics conference: OSAA 5A-3 Mid-Willamette Conference
- Mascot: Bulldog
- Team name: Bulldogs
- Rival: North Marion High School
- Website: Woodburn High School Homepage

Woodburn High School (WHS) is a four-year public high school located in Woodburn, Oregon, United States.

== Buildings ==
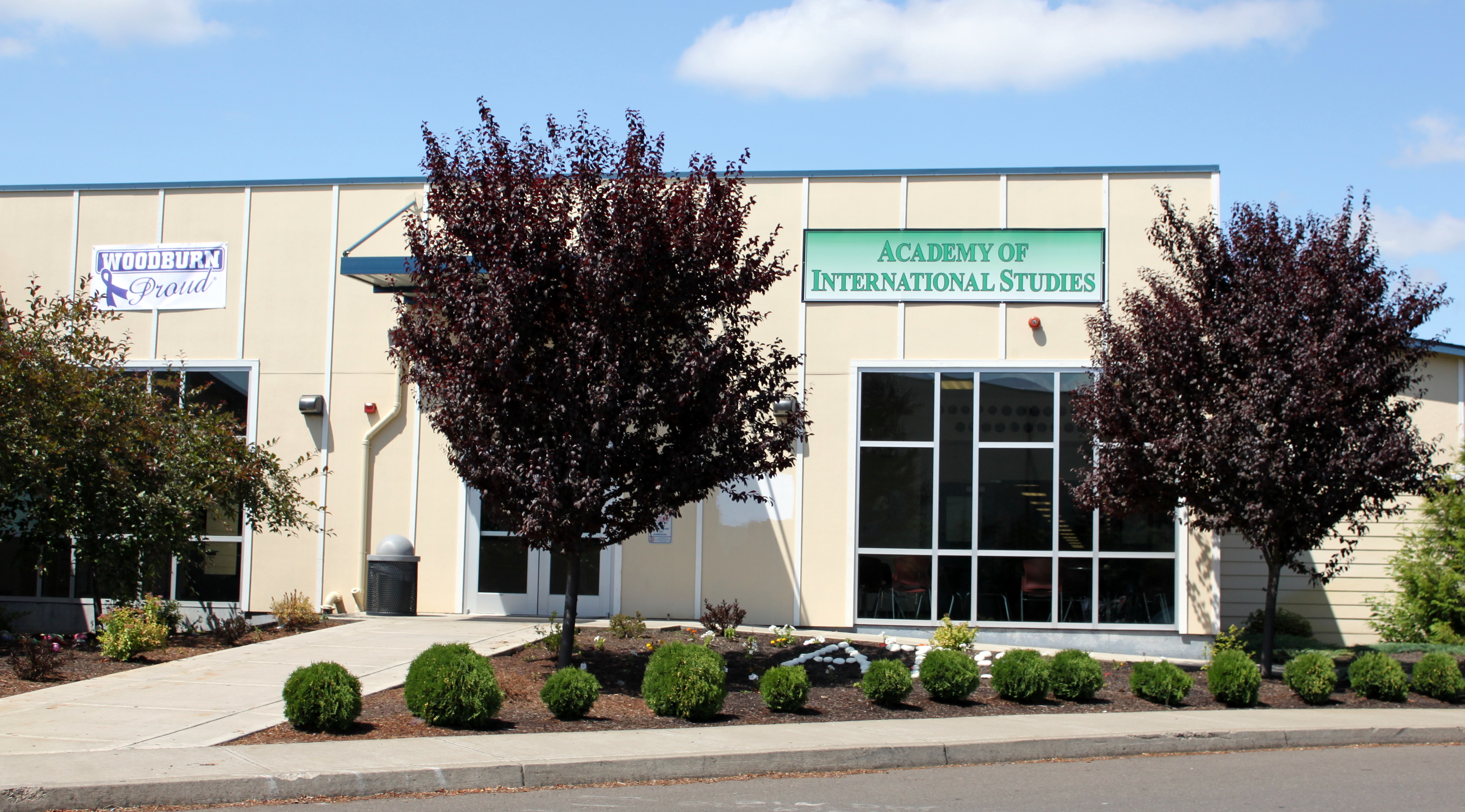
Academy of International Studies

Via funding from the Bill and Melinda Gates Foundation, the WHS campus is divided into four smaller schools and focus on different areas of study:

- Academy of International Studies (AIS)
- Woodburn Academy of Art, Science, & Technology (WAAST)
- Woodburn Arts & Communications Academy (WACA)
- Wellness, Business, and Sports School (WeBSS)

Since July 3, 2001, AIS, WAAST, and WACA have offered International Baccalaureate courses and students can earn a full IB diploma. WeBSS is the only school on the campus that offers Advanced Placement courses.

=== Fire ===
In 2012, 3 Woodburn High School Students were charged with first-degree arson and reckless endangerment after they set fire part of the building while playing around with Hand sanitizer and a lighter. The fire caused an estimated $5.5 million in damages. Only 1 student was sentenced to 4 days in Juvenile detention.

== Academics ==
In 2018, 255 of the school's seniors received a high school diploma, 25 seniors dropped out.

In 2022, 72% of the school's seniors received a high school diploma. Of 406 students, 320 graduated and 86 dropped out.

=== Academic achievements ===
In 2019 the Woodburn Academy of Arts, Science & Technology was ranked 6th on U.S. News' list of best high schools in Oregon.

== Athletics ==
Woodburn High School athletic teams compete in the OSAA 5A-3 Mid-Willamette Conference. The athletic director is Chad Waples and the athletics secretary is Karen Ramos.

State championships:

- Baseball: 1976
- Boys Soccer: 2011, 2012, 2016, 2017, 2018, 2019
- Girls Soccer: 2019, 2021
- Speech: 1996, 1997, 1998, 1999, 2000
- Wrestling: 1970, 1971, 1972, 1973, 1989

== Notable alumni ==
- Stacy Allison, author, motivational speaker, first American woman to reach the summit of Mt. Everest in 1988; class of 1976
- Kat Bjelland, lead singer of the punk rock band Babes in Toyland; class of 1981
- Tom Gorman, professional baseball player
- Kate Nauta, actress and model; class of 2000
