= 1971 Washington Redskins season =

NFL team season

- Owner: Edward Bennett Williams
- General manager: George Allen
- President: Edward Bennett Williams
- Head coach: George Allen
- Offensive coordinator: Ted Marchibroda
- Defensive coordinator: LaVern Torgeson
- Home stadium: RFK Stadium

Results
- Record: 9–4–1
- Division place: 2nd NFC East
- Playoffs: Lost Divisional Playoffs (at 49ers) 20–24

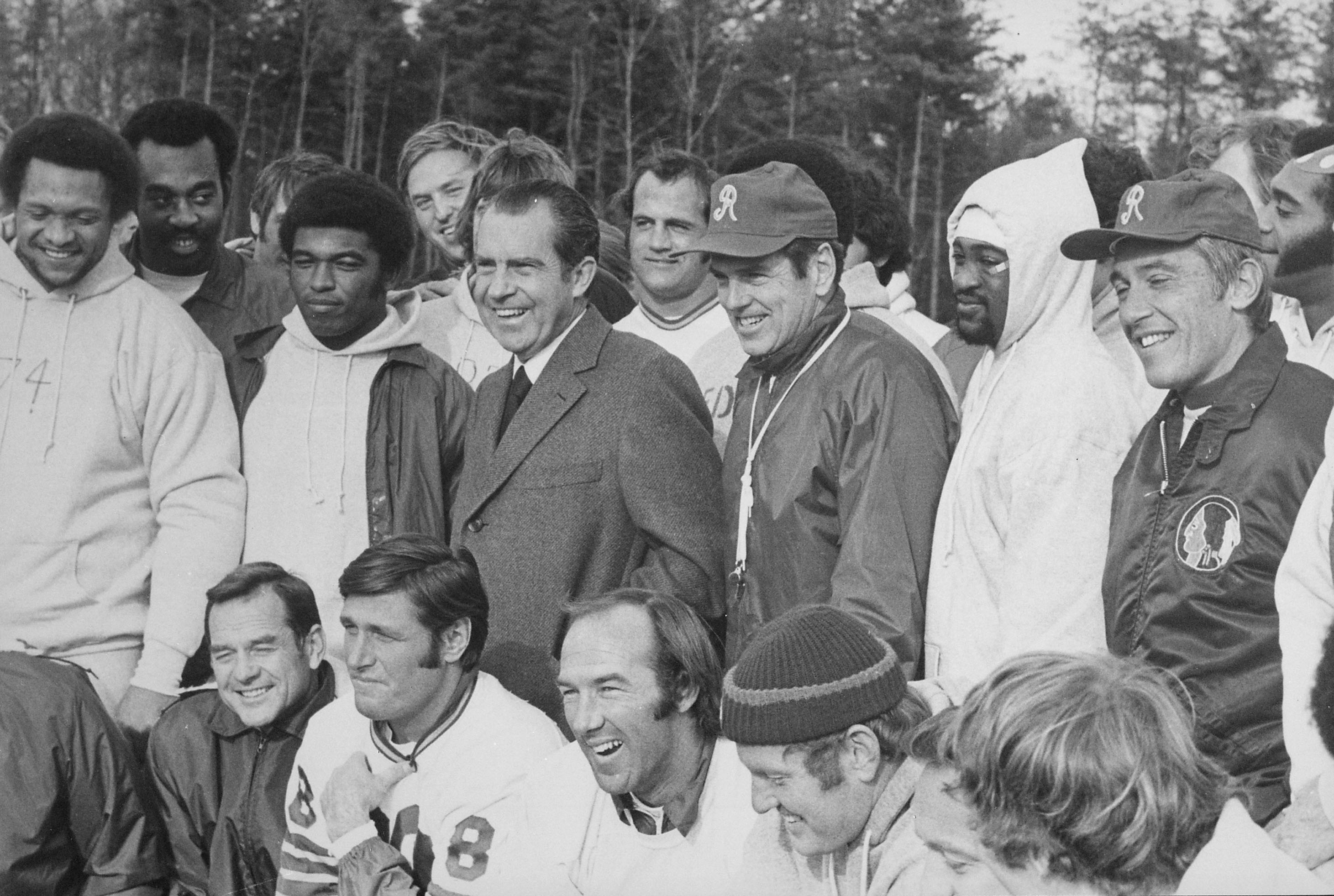
George Allen and members of the 1971 team with President Richard Nixon, two days before Thanksgiving.

The 1971 Washington Redskins season was the team's 40th in the National Football League, and its 35th in Washington, D.C. The Redskins were led by first-year head coach George Allen, who had been the head coach of the Los Angeles Rams for the previous five seasons.

Coming into the 1971 season, the team had not made the postseason in 26 years. The Redskins had had only four winning seasons since their last playoff berth in 1945, the most recent a 7–5–2 campaign in 1969 under Vince Lombardi, who died of colon cancer in September 1970.

Allen was Washington's fourth head coach in as many seasons. Lombardi succeeded Otto Graham, and assistant Bill Austin took over when Lombardi fell mortally ill in the summer of 1970, and posted a 6–8 record.

Despite a broken left ankle suffered by leading receiver Charley Taylor in a week 6 loss to the Kansas City Chiefs that forced him to miss the remainder of the season, the Redskins went 9–4–1, good for second place in the NFC East. They earned a wild card berth, but lost in the opening divisional round at San Francisco, 24–20.

== Off-season ==
=== NFL draft ===
1971 Washington Redskins draft
| Round | Selection | Player | Position | College |
|---|---|---|---|---|
| 2 | 38 | Cotton Speyrer | Wide Receiver | Texas |
| 6 | 141 | Conway Hayman | Guard | Delaware |
| 7 | 166 | Willie Germany | Defensive Back | Morgan State |
| 9 | 219 | Mike Fanucci | Defensive End | Arizona State |
| 10 | 244 | Jesse Taylor | Running Back | Cincinnati |
| 11 | 272 | George Starke | Tackle | Columbia |
| 12 | 297 | Jeff Severson | Defensive Back | Cal-Long Beach |
| 13 | 322 | Dan Ryczek | Center | Virginia |
| 14 | 349 | Bill Bynum | Quarterback | West New Mexico |
| 15 | 375 | Anthony Christnovich | Guard | La Crosse (Wis.) |
| 16 | 400 | Glenn Tucker | Linebacker | North Texas |

=== Undrafted free agents ===
1971 undrafted free agents of note
| Player | Position | College |
|---|---|---|
| Dewey Stendahl | Kicker | UW–La Crosse |

== Roster ==
1971 Washington Redskins roster
| Quarterbacks (QB): 9 Sonny Jurgensen; 17 Billy Kilmer; 18 Sam Wyche; Running backs (RB): 43 Larry Brown; 26 Bob Brunet; 31 Charley Harraway; 25 Mike Hull; 30 Jeff Jordan; 20 Tommy Mason; Wide receivers (WR): 86 Boyd Dowler; 80 Roy Jefferson; 24 Bill Malinchak; 85 Clifton McNeil; Tight ends (TE): 87 Jerry Smith | Offensive linemen (OL): 58 George Burman C; 56 Len Hauss C; 75 Terry Hermeling T; 73 Paul Laaveg G; 76 Walt Rock T; 62 Ray Schoenke G; 74 Jim Snowden T; 77 Mike Taylor T; 60 John Wilbur G; Defensive linemen (DL): 89 Verlon Biggs DE; 77 Bill Brundige DT; 82 Jimmie Jones DE; 79 Ron McDole DE; 64 Manny Sistrunk DT; 72 Diron Talbert DT | Linebackers (LB): 51 Bob Grant OLB; 55 Chris Hanburger OLB; 53 Harold McLinton OLB; 32 Jack Pardee OLB; 66 Myron Pottios MLB; 67 Rusty Tillman MLB; Defensive backs (DB): 41 Mike Bass CB; 45 Speedy Duncan CB/S; 37 Pat Fischer CB; 48 Jon Jaqua SS; 23 Brig Owens FS; 16 Richie Petitbon SS; 29 Ted Vactor CB; Special teams (ST): 4 Mike Bragg P; 5 Curt Knight K | Practice squad: 81 Mack Alston TE; 68 Mike Fanucci DE; 44 Jeff Severson S; Reserve: 50 Maxie Baughan LB (IR); 54 Mike Foote LB (IR); 61 Conway Hayman G (IR); 57 Dan Ryczek C (IR); 42 Charley Taylor WR (IR); Rookies in italics |

== Preseason ==
=== Schedule ===
| Week | Date | Opponent | Result | Record | Venue | Attendance | Recap |
|---|---|---|---|---|---|---|---|
| 1 | August 7 | at San Diego Chargers | L 10–19 | 0–1 | San Diego Stadium | 43,186 | |
| 2 | August 14 | at Denver Broncos | W 17–13 | 1–1 | Mile High Stadium | 42,561 | |
| 3 | August 21 | St. Louis Cardinals | W 20–13 | 2–1 | RFK Stadium | 40,228 | |
| 4 | August 28 | Baltimore Colts | L 14–20 | 2–2 | RFK Stadium | 46,045 | |
| 5 | September 4 | at Miami Dolphins | L 10–27 | 2–3 | Miami Orange Bowl | 61,202 | |
| 6 | September 11 | Cincinnati Bengals | T 17–17 | 2–3–1 | RFK Stadium | 39,105 | |

== Pre season Game summaries ==
=== Week P1 (Saturday, August 7, 1971): at San Diego Chargers ===
Preseason week 1: Washington Redskins 10 at San Diego Chargers 19 – Game summary

| Quarter | 1 | 2 | 3 | 4 | Total |
|---|---|---|---|---|---|
| Redskins | 3 | 7 | 0 | 0 | 10 |
| Chargers | 0 | 3 | 16 | 0 | 19 |

at San Diego Stadium • San Diego, California

- Date: August 7, 1971
- Game time: 11:00 p.m. EDT
- Game attendance: 43,186
- TV: WMAL-TV

| Team | Category | Player | Statistics |
|---|---|---|---|
| WAS | Passing | | |
| WAS | Rushing | | |
| WAS | Receiving | | |
| SD | Passing | | |
| SD | Rushing | | |
| SD | Receiving | | |

Scoring summary

| Quarter | Time | Drive | | | Team | Scoring information | Score | |
| Quarter | Time | Plays | Yards | TOP | Team | Scoring information | WAS | SD |
|---|---|---|---|---|---|---|---|---|
| "TOP" = time of possession. For other American football terms, see Glossary of American football. | | | | | | | 10 | 19 |

- Time of game:

| Redskins | Game Statistics | Chargers |
|---|---|---|
| | First downs | |
| | Rushes–yards | |
| | Passing yards | |
| | Passes | |
| | Sacked–yards | |
| | Net passing yards | |
| | Total yards | |
| | Return yards | |
| | Punts | |
| | Fumbles–lost | |
| | Penalties–yards | |

=== Week P2 (Saturday, August 14, 1971): at Denver Broncos ===
Preseason week 2: Washington Redskins 17 at Denver Broncos 13 – Game summary

| Quarter | 1 | 2 | 3 | 4 | Total |
|---|---|---|---|---|---|
| Redskins | 7 | 3 | 7 | 0 | 17 |
| Broncos | 6 | 0 | 0 | 7 | 13 |

at Mile High Stadium • Denver, Colorado

- Date: August 14, 1971
- Game time: 10:00 p.m. EDT
- Game attendance: 42,561
- Referee: Pat Haggerty
- TV: WMAL-TV

| Team | Category | Player | Statistics |
|---|---|---|---|
| WAS | Passing | | |
| WAS | Rushing | | |
| WAS | Receiving | | |
| DEN | Passing | | |
| DEN | Rushing | | |
| DEN | Receiving | | |

Scoring summary

| Quarter | Time | Drive | | | Team | Scoring information | Score | |
| Quarter | Time | Plays | Yards | TOP | Team | Scoring information | WAS | DEN |
|---|---|---|---|---|---|---|---|---|
| "TOP" = time of possession. For other American football terms, see Glossary of American football. | | | | | | | 17 | 13 |

- Time of game: 2 hours, 40 minutes

| Redskins | Game Statistics | Broncos |
|---|---|---|
| | First downs | |
| | Rushes–yards | |
| | Passing yards | |
| | Passes | |
| | Sacked–yards | |
| | Net passing yards | |
| | Total yards | |
| | Return yards | |
| | Punts | |
| | Fumbles–lost | |
| | Penalties–yards | |

=== Week P3 (Saturday, August 21, 1971): vs. St. Louis Cardinals ===
Preseason week 3: St. Louis Cardinals 13 at Washington Redskins 20 – Game summary

| Quarter | 1 | 2 | 3 | 4 | Total |
|---|---|---|---|---|---|
| Cardinals (1–1) | 0 | 0 | 0 | 13 | 13 |
| Redskins (2–1) | 7 | 6 | 7 | 0 | 20 |

at RFK Stadium • Washington, D.C.

- Date: August 21, 1971
- Game time: 8:00 p.m. EDT
- Game attendance: 40,228
- TV: WMAL-TV

| Team | Category | Player | Statistics |
|---|---|---|---|
| STL | Passing | | |
| STL | Rushing | | |
| STL | Receiving | | |
| WAS | Passing | | |
| WAS | Rushing | | |
| WAS | Receiving | | |

Scoring summary

| Quarter | Time | Drive | | | Team | Scoring information | Score | |
| Quarter | Time | Plays | Yards | TOP | Team | Scoring information | STL | WAS |
|---|---|---|---|---|---|---|---|---|
| "TOP" = time of possession. For other American football terms, see Glossary of American football. | | | | | | | 13 | 20 |

- Time of game:

| Cardinals | Game Statistics | Redskins |
|---|---|---|
| | First downs | |
| | Rushes–yards | |
| | Passing yards | |
| | Passes | |
| | Sacked–yards | |
| | Net passing yards | |
| | Total yards | |
| | Return yards | |
| | Punts | |
| | Fumbles–lost | |
| | Penalties–yards | |

=== Week P4 (Saturday, August 28, 1971): vs. Baltimore Colts ===
Preseason week 4: Baltimore Colts 20 at Washington Redskins 14 – Game summary

| Quarter | 1 | 2 | 3 | 4 | Total |
|---|---|---|---|---|---|
| Colts | 3 | 7 | 3 | 7 | 20 |
| Redskins | 0 | 0 | 0 | 14 | 14 |

at RFK Stadium • Washington, D.C.

- Date: August 28, 1971
- Game time: 8:00 p.m. EDT
- Game attendance: 46,045
- TV: WMAL-TV

| Team | Category | Player | Statistics |
|---|---|---|---|
| BAL | Passing | | |
| BAL | Rushing | | |
| BAL | Receiving | | |
| WAS | Passing | | |
| WAS | Rushing | | |
| WAS | Receiving | | |

Scoring summary

| Quarter | Time | Drive | | | Team | Scoring information | Score | |
| Quarter | Time | Plays | Yards | TOP | Team | Scoring information | BAL | WAS |
|---|---|---|---|---|---|---|---|---|
| "TOP" = time of possession. For other American football terms, see Glossary of American football. | | | | | | | 20 | 14 |

- Time of game:

| Colts | Game Statistics | Redskins |
|---|---|---|
| | First downs | |
| | Rushes–yards | |
| | Passing yards | |
| | Passes | |
| | Sacked–yards | |
| | Net passing yards | |
| | Total yards | |
| | Return yards | |
| | Punts | |
| | Fumbles–lost | |
| | Penalties–yards | |

=== Week P5 (Saturday, September 4, 1971): at Miami Dolphins ===
Preseason week 5: Washington Redskins 10 at Miami Dolphinss 27 – Game summary

| Quarter | 1 | 2 | 3 | 4 | Total |
|---|---|---|---|---|---|
| Redskins | 3 | 0 | 0 | 7 | 10 |
| Dolphins | 0 | 6 | 14 | 7 | 27 |

at Miami Orange Bowl • Miami, Florida

- Date: September 4, 1971
- Game time: 8:09 p.m. EDT
- Game attendance: 43,186
- Referee: Fred Wyant
- TV: WMAL-TV

| Team | Category | Player | Statistics |
|---|---|---|---|
| WAS | Passing | | |
| WAS | Rushing | | |
| WAS | Receiving | | |
| MIA | Passing | | |
| MIA | Rushing | | |
| MIA | Receiving | | |

Scoring summary

| Quarter | Time | Drive | | | Team | Scoring information | Score | |
| Quarter | Time | Plays | Yards | TOP | Team | Scoring information | WAS | MIA |
|---|---|---|---|---|---|---|---|---|
| "TOP" = time of possession. For other American football terms, see Glossary of American football. | | | | | | | 10 | 27 |

- Time of game: 2 hours, 27 minutes

| Redskins | Game Statistics | Dolphins |
|---|---|---|
| | First downs | |
| | Rushes–yards | |
| | Passing yards | |
| | Passes | |
| | Sacked–yards | |
| | Net passing yards | |
| | Total yards | |
| | Return yards | |
| | Punts | |
| | Fumbles–lost | |
| | Penalties–yards | |

=== Week P6 (Saturday, September 11, 1971): vs. Cincinnati Bengals ===
Preseason week 6: Cincinnati Bengals 17 at Washington Redskins 17 – Game summary

| Quarter | 1 | 2 | 3 | 4 | Total |
|---|---|---|---|---|---|
| Bengals | 0 | 10 | 0 | 7 | 17 |
| Redskins | 7 | 0 | 3 | 7 | 17 |

at RFK Stadium • Washington, D.C.

- Date: September 11, 1971
- Game time: 8:00 p.m. EDT
- Game attendance: 39,105
- TV: WMAL-TV

| Team | Category | Player | Statistics |
|---|---|---|---|
| CIN | Passing | | |
| CIN | Rushing | | |
| CIN | Receiving | | |
| WAS | Passing | | |
| WAS | Rushing | | |
| WAS | Receiving | | |

Scoring summary

| Quarter | Time | Drive | | | Team | Scoring information | Score | |
| Quarter | Time | Plays | Yards | TOP | Team | Scoring information | CIN | WAS |
|---|---|---|---|---|---|---|---|---|
| "TOP" = time of possession. For other American football terms, see Glossary of American football. | | | | | | | 17 | 17 |

- Time of game:

| Bengals | Game Statistics | Redskins |
|---|---|---|
| | First downs | |
| | Rushes–yards | |
| | Passing yards | |
| | Passes | |
| | Sacked–yards | |
| | Net passing yards | |
| | Total yards | |
| | Return yards | |
| | Punts | |
| | Fumbles–lost | |
| | Penalties–yards | |

== Regular season ==
=== Schedule ===
| Week | Date | Opponent | Result | Record | Venue | Attendance | Recap |
|---|---|---|---|---|---|---|---|
| 1 | September 19 | at **St. Louis Cardinals** | **W** 24–17 | 1–0 | Busch Memorial Stadium | 46,805 | Recap |
| 2 | September 26 | at **New York Giants** | **W** 30–3 | 2–0 | Yankee Stadium | 62,795 | Recap |
| 3 | October 3 | at **Dallas Cowboys** | **W** 20–16 | 3–0 | Cotton Bowl | 61,554 | Recap |
| 4 | October 10 | Houston Oilers | **W** 22–13 | 4–0 | RFK Stadium | 53,041 | Recap |
| 5 | October 17 | **St. Louis Cardinals** | **W** 20–0 | 5–0 | RFK Stadium | 53,041 | Recap |
| 6 | October 24 | at Kansas City Chiefs | **L** 20–27 | 5–1 | Municipal Stadium | 51,989 | Recap |
| 7 | October 31 | New Orleans Saints | **W** 24–14 | 6–1 | RFK Stadium | 53,041 | Recap |
| 8 | November 7 | **Philadelphia Eagles** | **T** 7–7 | 6–1–1 | RFK Stadium | 53,041 | Recap |
| 9 | November 14 | at Chicago Bears | **L** 15–16 | 6–2–1 | Soldier Field | 55,049 | Recap |
| 10 | November 21 | **Dallas Cowboys** | **L** 0–13 | 6–3–1 | RFK Stadium | 53,041 | Recap |
| 11 | November 28 | at **Philadelphia Eagles** | **W** 20–13 | 7–3–1 | Veterans Stadium | 65,358 | Recap |
| 12 | December 5 | **New York Giants** | **W** 23–7 | 8–3–1 | RFK Stadium | 53,041 | Recap |
| 13 | December 13 | at Los Angeles Rams | **W** 38–24 | 9–3–1 | Los Angeles Memorial Coliseum | 80,402 | Recap |
| 14 | December 19 | Cleveland Browns | **L** 13–20 | 9–4–1 | RFK Stadium | 53,041 | Recap |
Note: Intra-division opponents are in **bold** text.

=== Standings ===
NFC East
| | W | L | T | PCT | DIV | CONF | PF | PA | STK |
|---|---|---|---|---|---|---|---|---|---|
| Dallas Cowboys | 11 | 3 | 0 | .786 | 7–1 | 8–3 | 406 | 222 | W7 |
| Washington Redskins | 9 | 4 | 1 | .692 | 6–1–1 | 8–2–1 | 276 | 190 | L1 |
| Philadelphia Eagles | 6 | 7 | 1 | .462 | 4–3–1 | 5–5–1 | 221 | 302 | W3 |
| St. Louis Cardinals | 4 | 9 | 1 | .308 | 1–7 | 2–8–1 | 231 | 279 | L2 |
| New York Giants | 4 | 10 | 0 | .286 | 1–7 | 3–8 | 228 | 362 | L5 |

Note: Tie games were not officially counted in the standings until 1972.

== Regular season game summaries ==
=== Week 1 (Sunday, September 19, 1971): at St. Louis Cardinals ===
Week 1: Washington Redskins 24 at St. Louis Cardinals 17 – Game summary

| Quarter | 1 | 2 | 3 | 4 | Total |
|---|---|---|---|---|---|
| Redskins (1–0) | 7 | 0 | 14 | 3 | 24 |
| Cardinals (0–1) | 0 | 10 | 0 | 7 | 17 |

at Busch Memorial Stadium • St. Louis, Missouri

- Date: September 19, 1971
- Game time: 2:00 p.m. EDT
- Game weather: 58 °F (14 °C); relative humidity 100%; wind 9 miles per hour (14 km/h; 7.8 kn) (Light rain)
- Game attendance: 46,805
- Referee: Fred Silva
- TV announcers (CBS): Jack Drees (play-by-play), George Connor (color commentator) and Bruce Roberts (studio reporter)

| Team | Category | Player | Statistics |
|---|---|---|---|
| WAS | Passing | Billy Kilmer | 6/17, 65 YDS, 1 TD |
| WAS | Rushing | Larry Brown | 18 CAR, 79 YDS, 1 TD |
| WAS | Receiving | Jerry Smith | 2 REC, 35 YDS, 1 TD |
| STL | Passing | Jim Hart | 5/15, 74 YDS, 1 TD, 3 INTs |
| STL | Rushing | MacArthur Lane | 19 CAR, 54 YDS |
| STL | Receiving | Jackie Smith | 5 REC, 63 YDS, 2 TDs |

Scoring summary

| Quarter | Time | Drive | | | Team | Scoring information | Score | |
| Quarter | Time | Plays | Yards | TOP | Team | Scoring information | WAS | STL |
|---|---|---|---|---|---|---|---|---|
| 1 | | | | | Redskins | Brown 1-yard touchdown run, Knight kick good | 7 | 0 |
| 2 | | | | | Cardinals | Smith 8-yard touchdown reception from Hart, Bakken kick good | 7 | 7 |
| 2 | | | | | Cardinals | 25-yard field goal by Bakken | 7 | 10 |
| 3 | | — | — | — | Redskins | Fumble recovery returned 16 yards for touchdown by Hanburger, Knight kick good | 14 | 10 |
| 3 | | | | | Redskins | Smith 31-yard touchdown reception from Kilmer, Knight kick good | 21 | 10 |
| 4 | | | | | Cardinals | Smith 9-yard touchdown reception from Hart, Bakken kick good | 21 | 17 |
| 4 | | | | | Redskins | 25-yard field goal by Knight | 24 | 17 |
| "TOP" = time of possession. For other American football terms, see Glossary of American football. | | | | | | | 24 | 17 |

- Point spread: Redskins +7½
- Time of game:

| Redskins | Game Statistics | Cardinals |
|---|---|---|
| 10 | First downs | 13 |
| 38–148 | Rushes–yards | 38–117 |
| 65 | Passing yards | 138 |
| 6–17–0 | Passes | 10–27–4 |
| 0–0 | Sacked–yards | 0–0 |
| 65 | Net passing yards | 138 |
| 213 | Total yards | 255 |
| 171 | Return yards | 138 |
| 7–40.9 | Punts | 5–39.8 |
| 2–1 | Fumbles–lost | 3–3 |
| 3–25 | Penalties–yards | 6–39 |

Individual stats

Redskins Passing
| | C/ATT^{1} | Yds | TD | INT | Sk | Yds | LG^{3} | Rate |
|---|---|---|---|---|---|---|---|---|
| Kilmer | 6/17 | 65 | 1 | 0 | 0 | 0 | 31 | 67.0 |

Redskins Rushing
| | Car^{2} | Yds | TD | LG^{3} |
|---|---|---|---|---|
| Brown | 18 | 79 | 1 | 21 |
| Harraway | 13 | 62 | 0 | 20 |
| Smith | 1 | 5 | 0 | 5 |
| Milmer | 3 | 2 | 0 | 2 |
| Mason | 1 | 2 | 0 | 2 |
| Jefferson | 1 | 0 | 0 | 0 |
| Petitbon | 1 | –2 | 0 | –2 |

Redskins Receiving
| | Rec^{4} | Yds | TD | LG^{3} |
|---|---|---|---|---|
| Smith | 2 | 35 | 1 | 31 |
| Taylor | 2 | 11 | 0 | 6 |
| Brown | 1 | 10 | 0 | 10 |
| Dowler | 1 | 9 | 0 | 9 |

Redskins Kick Returns
| | Ret | Yds | Y/Rt | TD | Lng |
|---|---|---|---|---|---|
| Duncan | 4 | 90 | 22.5 | 0 | 0 |

Redskins Punt Returns
| | Ret | Yds | Y/Rt | TD | Lng |
|---|---|---|---|---|---|
| Duncan | 2 | 7 | 3.5 | 0 | 0 |

Redskins Punting
| | Pnt | Yds | Y/P | Lng | Blck |
|---|---|---|---|---|---|
| Bragg | 7 | 286 | 40.9 | 50 | |

Redskins Kicking
| | XPM–XPA | FGM–FGA | MFG |
|---|---|---|---|
| Knight | 3–3 | 1–3 | |

Redskins Interceptions
| | Int | Yds | TD | LG | PD |
|---|---|---|---|---|---|
| Petitbon | 3 | 66 | 0 | 0 | |
| Owens | 1 | 8 | 0 | 8 | |

Starting Lineups

| Position | Starting Lineups: Week 1 – at St. Louis |
|---|---|
Offense
| WR | Charley Taylor |
| LT | Jim Snowden |
| LG | Ray Schoenke |
| C | Len Hauss |
| RG | John Wilbur |
| RT | Walt Rock |
| TE | Jerry Smith |
| WR | Roy Jefferson |
| QB | Billy Kilmer |
| FB | Charley Harraway |
| RB | Larry Brown |
Defense
| LDE | Ron McDole |
| LDT | Manny Sistrunk |
| RDT | Diron Talbert |
| RDE | Verlon Biggs |
| LLB | Jack Pardee |
| MLB | Myron Pottios |
| RLB | Chris Hanburger |
| LCB | Pat Fischer |
| RCB | Mike Bass |
| SS | Richie Petitbon |
| FS | Brig Owens |

=== Week 2 (Sunday, September 26, 1971): at New York Giants ===
Week 2: Washington Redskins 30 at New York Giants 3 – Game summary

| Quarter | 1 | 2 | 3 | 4 | Total |
|---|---|---|---|---|---|
| Redskins (2–0) | 14 | 3 | 3 | 10 | 30 |
| Giants (1–1) | 3 | 0 | 0 | 0 | 3 |

at Yankee Stadium • Bronx, New York

- Date: September 26, 1971
- Game time: 1:00 p.m. EDT
- Game weather: 62 °F (17 °C); relative humidity 59%; wind 8 miles per hour (13 km/h; 7.0 kn) (Light rain)
- Game attendance: 62,795
- Referee: Ben Dreith
- TV announcers (CBS): Ray Scott (play-by-play), Pat Summerall (color commentator) and Bill Mazer (studio reporter)

| Team | Category | Player | Statistics |
|---|---|---|---|
| WAS | Passing | Billy Kilmer | 23/32, 309 YDS, 2 TDs |
| WAS | Rushing | Larry Brown | 16 CAR, 72 YDS |
| WAS | Receiving | Roy Jefferson | 8 REC, 95 YDS |
| NYG | Passing | Fran Tarkenton | 12/21, 119 YDS, 2 INTs |
| NYG | Rushing | Bobby Duhon | 9 CAR, 37 YDS |
| NYG | Receiving | Clifton McNeil | 4 REC, 59 YDS |

Scoring summary

| Quarter | Time | Drive | | | Team | Scoring information | Score | |
| Quarter | Time | Plays | Yards | TOP | Team | Scoring information | WAS | NYG |
|---|---|---|---|---|---|---|---|---|
| 1 | | | | | Giants | 18-yard field goal by Gogolak | 0 | 3 |
| 1 | | | | | Redskins | Taylor 71-yard touchdown reception from Kilmer, Knight kick good | 7 | 3 |
| 1 | | — | — | — | Redskins | Interception returned 20 yards for touchdown by Pardee, Knight kick good | 14 | 3 |
| 2 | | | | | Redskins | 52-yard field goal by Knight | 17 | 3 |
| 3 | | | | | Redskins | 32-yard field goal by Knight | 20 | 3 |
| 4 | | | | | Redskins | Taylor 1-yard touchdown reception from Kilmer, Knight kick good | 27 | 3 |
| 4 | | | | | Redskins | 18-yard field goal by Knight | 30 | 3 |
| "TOP" = time of possession. For other American football terms, see Glossary of American football. | | | | | | | 30 | 3 |

- Point spread: Redskins –2½
- Time of game:

| Redskins | Game Statistics | Giants |
|---|---|---|
| 19 | First downs | 13 |
| 30–126 | Rushes–yards | 25–68 |
| 309 | Passing yards | 139 |
| 23–32–0 | Passes | 14–30–2 |
| 1–8 | Sacked–yards | 5–51 |
| 301 | Net passing yards | 88 |
| 427 | Total yards | 156 |
| 125 | Return yards | 79 |
| 5–38.4 | Punts | 9–42.3 |
| 1–0 | Fumbles–lost | 2–0 |
| 15–178 | Penalties–yards | 9–72 |

Individual stats

Redskins Passing
| | C/ATT^{1} | Yds | TD | INT | Sk | Yds | LG^{3} | Rate |
|---|---|---|---|---|---|---|---|---|
| Kilmer | 23/32 | 309 | 2 | 0 | 1 | 8 | 71 | 123.0 |

Redskins Rushing
| | Car^{2} | Yds | TD | LG^{3} |
|---|---|---|---|---|
| Brown | 16 | 72 | 0 | 13 |
| Harraway | 9 | 41 | 0 | 19 |
| Mason | 5 | 13 | 0 | 7 |

Redskins Receiving
| | Rec^{4} | Yds | TD | LG^{3} |
|---|---|---|---|---|
| Jefferson | 8 | 95 | 0 | 18 |
| Taloyr | 6 | 125 | 2 | 71 |
| Smith | 5 | 61 | 0 | 23 |
| Brown | 2 | 8 | 0 | 4 |
| Dowler | 1 | 16 | 0 | 16 |
| Harraway | 1 | 4 | 0 | 4 |

Redskins Kick Returns
| | Ret | Yds | Y/Rt | TD | Lng |
|---|---|---|---|---|---|
| Duncan | 1 | 23 | 23.0 | 0 | 0 |

Redskins Punt Returns
| | Ret | Yds | Y/Rt | TD | Lng |
|---|---|---|---|---|---|
| Vactor | 5 | 42 | 8.4 | 0 | 0 |
| Duncan | 3 | 26 | 8.7 | 0 | 0 |

Redskins Punting
| | Pnt | Yds | Y/P | Lng | Blck |
|---|---|---|---|---|---|
| Bragg | 5 | 192 | 38.4 | 45 | |

Redskins Kicking
| | XPM–XPA | FGM–FGA | MFG |
|---|---|---|---|
| Knight | 3–3 | 3–4 | |

Redskins Interceptions
| | Int | Yds | TD | LG | PD |
|---|---|---|---|---|---|
| Pardee | 1 | 20 | 1 | 20 | |
| Petitbon | 1 | 14 | 0 | 14 | |

Starting Lineups

| Position | Starting Lineups: Week 2 – at N.Y. Giants |
|---|---|
Offense
| WR | Charley Taylor |
| LT | Jim Snowden |
| LG | Ray Schoenke |
| C | Len Hauss |
| RG | John Wilbur |
| RT | Walt Rock |
| TE | Jerry Smith |
| WR | Roy Jefferson |
| QB | Billy Kilmer |
| FB | Charley Harraway |
| RB | Larry Brown |
Defense
| LDE | Ron McDole |
| LDT | Manny Sistrunk |
| RDT | Diron Talbert |
| RDE | Verlon Biggs |
| LLB | Jack Pardee |
| MLB | Myron Pottios |
| RLB | Chris Hanburger |
| LCB | Pat Fischer |
| RCB | Mike Bass |
| SS | Richie Petitbon |
| FS | Brig Owens |

=== Week 3 (Sunday, October 3, 1971): at Dallas Cowboys ===
Week 3: Washington Redskins 20 at Dallas Cowboys 16 – Game summary

| Quarter | 1 | 2 | 3 | 4 | Total |
|---|---|---|---|---|---|
| Redskins (3–0) | 7 | 7 | 3 | 3 | 20 |
| Cowboys (2–1) | 0 | 9 | 0 | 7 | 16 |

at Cotton Bowl • Dallas, Texas

- Date: October 3, 1971
- Game time: 2:00 p.m. EDT
- Game weather: 70 °F (21 °C); relative humidity 94%; wind 10 miles per hour (16 km/h; 8.7 kn) (Fog, Light rain)
- Game attendance: 61,554
- Referee: Jack Reader
- TV announcers (CBS): Frank Glieber (play-by-play), Eddie LeBaron (color commentator) and Frank Clarke (studio reporter)

| Team | Category | Player | Statistics |
|---|---|---|---|
| WAS | Passing | Billy Kilmer | 5/10, 94 YDS, 1 TD, 1 INT |
| WAS | Rushing | Charley Harraway | 18 CAR, 111 YDS, 1 TD |
| WAS | Receiving | Roy Jefferson | 2 REC, 67 YDS, 1 TD |
| DAL | Passing | Craig Morton | 11/26, 124 YDS |
| DAL | Rushing | Calvin Hill | 19 CAR, 65 YDS, 1 TD |
| DAL | Receiving | Walt Garrison | 5 REC, 44 YDS |

Scoring summary

| Quarter | Time | Drive | | | Team | Scoring information | Score | |
| Quarter | Time | Plays | Yards | TOP | Team | Scoring information | WAS | DAL |
|---|---|---|---|---|---|---|---|---|
| 1 | | | | | Redskins | Harraway 57-yard touchdown run, Knight kick good | 7 | 0 |
| 2 | | | | | Cowboys | 22-yard field goal by Clark | 7 | 3 |
| 2 | | | | | Redskins | Jefferson 50-yard touchdown reception from Kilmer, Knight kick good | 14 | 3 |
| 2 | | | | | Cowboys | 9-yard field goal by Clark | 14 | 6 |
| 2 | | | | | Cowboys | 27-yard field goal by Clark | 14 | 9 |
| 3 | | | | | Redskins | 25-yard field goal by Knight | 17 | 9 |
| 4 | | | | | Redskins | 32-yard field goal by Knight | 20 | 9 |
| 4 | | | | | Cowboys | Hill 1-yard touchdown run, Clark kick good | 20 | 16 |
| "TOP" = time of possession. For other American football terms, see Glossary of American football. | | | | | | | 20 | 16 |

- Point spread: Redskins +10
- Time of game:

| Redskins | Game Statistics | Cowboys |
|---|---|---|
| 14 | First downs | 20 |
| 41–200 | Rushes–yards | 29–82 |
| 94 | Passing yards | 227 |
| 5–10–1 | Passes | 17–35–0 |
| 2–9 | Sacked–yards | 3–42 |
| 85 | Net passing yards | 185 |
| 285 | Total yards | 267 |
| 110 | Return yards | 134 |
| 3–51.0 | Punts | 5–42.6 |
| 3–2 | Fumbles–lost | 1–1 |
| 3–15 | Penalties–yards | 5–35 |

Individual stats

Redskins Passing
| | C/ATT^{1} | Yds | TD | INT | Sk | Yds | LG^{3} | Rate |
|---|---|---|---|---|---|---|---|---|
| Kilmer | 5/10 | 94 | 1 | 1 | 2 | 9 | 50 | 76.7 |

Redskins Rushing
| | Car^{2} | Yds | TD | LG^{3} |
|---|---|---|---|---|
| Harrayway | 18 | 111 | 1 | 57 |
| Brown | 21 | 81 | 0 | 14 |
| Mason | 1 | 6 | 0 | 6 |
| Kilmer | 1 | 2 | 0 | 2 |

Redskins Receiving
| | Rec^{4} | Yds | TD | LG^{3} |
|---|---|---|---|---|
| Jefferson | 2 | 67 | 1 | 50 |
| Taylor | 2 | 17 | 0 | 9 |
| Smith | 1 | 10 | 0 | 10 |

Redskins Kick Returns
| | Ret | Yds | Y/Rt | TD | Lng |
|---|---|---|---|---|---|
| Duncan | 3 | 80 | 26.7 | 0 | 0 |

Redskins Punt Returns
| | Ret | Yds | Y/Rt | TD | Lng |
|---|---|---|---|---|---|
| Vactor | 3 | 30 | 10.0 | 0 | 0 |

Redskins Punting
| | Pnt | Yds | Y/P | Lng | Blck |
|---|---|---|---|---|---|
| Bragg | 3 | 153 | 51.0 | 58 | |

Redskins Kicking
| | XPM–XPA | FGM–FGA |
|---|---|---|
| Knight | 2–2 | 2–2 |

Starting Lineups

| Position | Starting Lineups: Week 3 – at Dallas |
|---|---|
Offense
| WR | Charley Taylor |
| LT | Jim Snowden |
| LG | Ray Schoenke |
| C | Len Hauss |
| RG | John Wilbur |
| RT | Walt Rock |
| TE | Jerry Smith |
| WR | Roy Jefferson |
| QB | Billy Kilmer |
| FB | Charley Harraway |
| RB | Larry Brown |
Defense
| LDE | Ron McDole |
| LDT | Manny Sistrunk |
| RDT | Diron Talbert |
| RDE | Verlon Biggs |
| LLB | Jack Pardee |
| MLB | Myron Pottios |
| RLB | Chris Hanburger |
| LCB | Pat Fischer |
| RCB | Mike Bass |
| SS | Richie Petitbon |
| FS | Brig Owens |

=== Week 4 (Sunday, October 10, 1971): vs. Houston Oilers ===
Week 4: Houston Oilers 13 at Washington Redskins 22 – Game summary

| Quarter | 1 | 2 | 3 | 4 | Total |
|---|---|---|---|---|---|
| Oilers (0–3–1) | 0 | 10 | 3 | 0 | 13 |
| Redskins (4–0) | 6 | 10 | 0 | 6 | 22 |

at RFK Stadium • Washington, D.C.

- Date: October 10, 1971
- Game time: 1:00 p.m. EDT
- Game weather: 57 °F (14 °C); relative humidity 96%; wind 9 miles per hour (14 km/h; 7.8 kn) (Light rain)
- Game attendance: 53,041
- Referee: Bernie Ulman
- TV announcers (KPRC-TV (Houston)): Bill Enis (play-by-play) and Paul Maguire (color commentator)

| Team | Category | Player | Statistics |
|---|---|---|---|
| HOU | Passing | Charley Johnson | 16/34, 160 YDS, 1 TD, 2 INTs |
| HOU | Rushing | Leroy Sledge | 9 CAR, 31 YDS |
| HOU | Receiving | Willie Frazier | 4 REC, 36 YDS |
| WAS | Passing | Billy Kilmer | 10/21, 136 YDS |
| WAS | Rushing | Charley Harraway | 19 CAR, 65 YDS |
| WAS | Receiving | Charley Taylor | 4 REC, 59 YDS |

Scoring summary

| Quarter | Time | Drive | | | Team | Scoring information | Score | |
| Quarter | Time | Plays | Yards | TOP | Team | Scoring information | HOU | WAS |
|---|---|---|---|---|---|---|---|---|
| 1 | | | | | Redskins | 15-yard field goal by Knight | 0 | 3 |
| 1 | | | | | Redskins | 36-yard field goal by Knight | 0 | 6 |
| 2 | | | | | Redskins | 13-yard field goal by Knight | 0 | 9 |
| 2 | | | | | Oilers | Sledge 5-yard touchdown reception from Johnson, Moseley kick good | 7 | 9 |
| 2 | | — | — | — | Redskins | Interception returned 18 yards for touchdown by McDole, Knight kick good | 7 | 16 |
| 2 | | | | | Oilers | 42-yard field goal by Moseley | 10 | 16 |
| 3 | | | | | Oilers | 25-yard field goal by Moseley | 13 | 16 |
| 4 | | | | | Redskins | 17-yard field goal by Knight | 13 | 19 |
| 4 | | | | | Redskins | 39-yard field goal by Knight | 13 | 22 |
| "TOP" = time of possession. For other American football terms, see Glossary of American football. | | | | | | | 13 | 22 |

- Point spread: Redskins –10½
- Time of game:

| Oilers | Game Statistics | Redskins |
|---|---|---|
| 13 | First downs | 11 |
| 21–46 | Rushes–yards | 40–115 |
| 160 | Passing yards | 136 |
| 16–35–3 | Passes | 10–21–0 |
| 2–14 | Sacked–yards | 0–0 |
| 146 | Net passing yards | 136 |
| 192 | Total yards | 251 |
| 106 | Return yards | 165 |
| 7–44.7 | Punts | 5–36.2 |
| 2–2 | Fumbles–lost | 2–2 |
| 4–35 | Penalties–yards | 5–63 |

Individual stats

Redskins Passing
| | C/ATT^{1} | Yds | TD | INT | Sk | Yds | LG^{3} | Rate |
|---|---|---|---|---|---|---|---|---|
| Kilmer | 10/32 | 136 | 0 | 0 | 0 | 0 | 47 | 68.7 |

Redskins Rushing
| | Car^{2} | Yds | TD | LG^{3} |
|---|---|---|---|---|
| Harraway | 19 | 65 | 0 | 9 |
| Brown | 18 | 51 | 0 | 7 |
| Kilmer | 3 | –1 | 0 | 1 |

Redskins Receiving
| | Rec^{4} | Yds | TD | LG^{3} |
|---|---|---|---|---|
| Taylor | 4 | 59 | 0 | 43 |
| Jefferson | 3 | 56 | 0 | 47 |
| Smith | 1 | 18 | 0 | 18 |
| Harraway | 1 | 2 | 0 | 2 |
| Brown | 1 | 1 | 0 | 1 |

Starting Lineups

=== Week 5 (Sunday, October 17, 1971): vs. St. Louis Cardinals ===
Week 5: St. Louis Cardinals 0 at Washington Redskins 20 – Game summary

| Quarter | 1 | 2 | 3 | 4 | Total |
|---|---|---|---|---|---|
| Cardinals (2–3) | 0 | 0 | 0 | 0 | 0 |
| Redskins (5–0) | 10 | 0 | 3 | 7 | 20 |

at RFK Stadium • Washington, D.C.

- Date: October 17, 1971
- Game time: 1:00 p.m. EDT
- Game weather: 62 °F (17 °C); relative humidity 90%; wind 8 miles per hour (13 km/h; 7.0 kn) (Smoke haze)
- Game attendance: 53,041
- Referee: Norm Schachter
- TV announcers (CBS): Jack Buck (play-by-play), Alex Hawkins (color commentator) and Andy Musser (studio reporter)

| Team | Category | Player | Statistics |
|---|---|---|---|
| STL | Passing | Pete Beathard | 12/22, 142 YDS, 3 INTs |
| STL | Rushing | Roy Shivers | 6 CAR, 11 YDS |
| STL | Receiving | John Gilliam | 4 REC, 54 YDS |
| WAS | Passing | Billy Kilmer | 9/17, 126 YDS, 1 INT |
| WAS | Rushing | Larry Brown | 25 CAR, 150 YDS |
| WAS | Receiving | Roy Jefferson | 4 REC, 62 YDS |

Scoring summary

| Quarter | Time | Drive | | | Team | Scoring information | Score | |
| Quarter | Time | Plays | Yards | TOP | Team | Scoring information | STL | WAS |
|---|---|---|---|---|---|---|---|---|
| 1 | | | | | Redskins | 16-yard field goal by Knight | 0 | 3 |
| 1 | | | | | Redskins | Harraway 1-yard touchdown run, Knight kick good | 0 | 10 |
| 3 | | | | | Redskins | 11-yard field goal by Knight | 0 | 13 |
| 4 | | | | | Redskins | Kilmer 3-yard touchdown run, Knight kick good | 0 | 20 |
| "TOP" = time of possession. For other American football terms, see Glossary of American football. | | | | | | | 0 | 20 |

- Point spread: Redskins –4
- Time of game:

| Cardinals | Game Statistics | Redskins |
|---|---|---|
| 11 | First downs | 21 |
| 14–25 | Rushes–yards | 47–229 |
| 180 | Passing yards | 126 |
| 15–30–4 | Passes | 9–17–1 |
| 0–0 | Sacked–yards | 1–6 |
| 180 | Net passing yards | 120 |
| 205 | Total yards | 349 |
| 100 | Return yards | 52 |
| 5–41.4 | Punts | 4–42.5 |
| 3–3 | Fumbles–lost | 2–1 |
| 4–30 | Penalties–yards | 7–60 |

Individual stats

Redskins Passing
| | C/ATT^{1} | Yds | TD | INT | Sk | Yds | LG^{3} | Rate |
|---|---|---|---|---|---|---|---|---|
| Kilmer | 9/17 | 126 | 0 | 1 | 1 | 6 | 38 | 52.6 |

Redskins Rushing
| | Car^{2} | Yds | TD | LG^{3} |
|---|---|---|---|---|
| Brown | 25 | 150 | 0 | 29 |
| Harraway | 12 | 40 | 1 | 19 |
| Jefferson | 1 | 13 | 0 | 13 |
| Mason | 5 | 11 | 0 | 10 |
| Hull | 2 | 8 | 0 | 6 |
| Wyche | 1 | 4 | 0 | 4 |
| Kilmer | 1 | 3 | 1 | 3 |

Redskins Receiving
| | Rec^{4} | Yds | TD | LG^{3} |
|---|---|---|---|---|
| Jefferson | 4 | 62 | 0 | 38 |
| Taylor | 3 | 33 | 0 | 17 |
| Alston | 1 | 21 | 0 | 21 |
| Dowler | 1 | 10 | 0 | 10 |

Redskins Kick Returns
| | Ret | Yds | Y/Rt | TD | Lng |
|---|---|---|---|---|---|
| Duncan | 1 | 25 | 25.0 | 0 | 0 |

Redskins Punt Returns
| | Ret | Yds | Y/Rt | TD | Lng |
|---|---|---|---|---|---|
| Vactor | 1 | 0 | 0.0 | 0 | 0 |

Redskins Punting
| | Pnt | Yds | Y/P | Lng | Blck |
|---|---|---|---|---|---|
| Bragg | 4 | 170 | 42.5 | 58 | |

Redskins Kicking
| | XPM–XPA | FGM–FGA | MFG |
|---|---|---|---|
| Knight | 2–2 | 2–3 | |

Redskins Interceptions
| | Int | Yds | TD | LG | PD |
|---|---|---|---|---|---|
| Pardee | 3 | 25 | 0 | 0 | |
| Bass | 1 | 2 | 0 | 2 | |

Starting Lineups

| Position | Starting Lineups: Week 5 – vs. St. Louis |
|---|---|
Offense
| WR | Charley Taylor |
| LT | Jim Snowden |
| LG | Ray Schoenke |
| C | Len Hauss |
| RG | John Wilbur |
| RT | Walt Rock |
| TE | Jerry Smith |
| WR | Roy Jefferson |
| QB | Billy Kilmer |
| FB | Charley Harraway |
| RB | Larry Brown |
Defense
| LDE | Ron McDole |
| LDT | Manny Sistrunk |
| RDT | Diron Talbert |
| RDE | Verlon Biggs |
| LLB | Jack Pardee |
| MLB | Myron Pottios |
| RLB | Chris Hanburger |
| LCB | Pat Fischer |
| RCB | Mike Bass |
| SS | Richie Petitbon |
| FS | Brig Owens |

=== Week 6 (Sunday, October 24, 1971): at Kansas City Chiefs ===
Week 6: Washington Redskins 20 at Kansas City Chiefs 27 – Game summary

| Quarter | 1 | 2 | 3 | 4 | Total |
|---|---|---|---|---|---|
| Redskins (5–1) | 10 | 7 | 0 | 3 | 20 |
| Chiefs (5–1) | 3 | 3 | 7 | 14 | 27 |

at Municipal Stadium • Kansas City, Missouri

- Date: October 24, 1971
- Game time: 4:00 p.m. EDT
- Game weather: 62 °F (17 °C); relative humidity 84%; wind 6 miles per hour (9.7 km/h; 5.2 kn) (Drizzle)
- Game attendance: 51,989
- Referee: Jack Vest
- TV announcers (CBS): Ray Scott (play-by-play), Pat Summerall (color commentator) and Ron Barr (studio reporter)

| Team | Category | Player | Statistics |
|---|---|---|---|
| WAS | Passing | Billy Kilmer | 15/38, 220 YDS, 2 TDs, 1 INT |
| WAS | Rushing | Charley Harraway | 12 CAR, 58 YDS |
| WAS | Receiving | Charley Taylor | 7 REC, 125 YDS, 2 TDs |
| KC | Passing | Len Dawson | 10/23, 203 YDS, 3 TDs, 2 INTs |
| KC | Rushing | Ed Podolak | 24 CAR, 110 YDS |
| KC | Receiving | Otis Taylor | 5 REC, 105 YDS, 2 TDs |

Scoring summary

| Quarter | Time | Drive | | | Team | Scoring information | Score | |
| Quarter | Time | Plays | Yards | TOP | Team | Scoring information | WAS | KC |
|---|---|---|---|---|---|---|---|---|
| 1 | | | | | Redskins | Taylor 4-yard touchdown reception from Kilmer, Knight kick good | 7 | 0 |
| 1 | | | | | Chiefs | 39-yard field goal by Stenerud | 7 | 3 |
| 1 | | | | | Redskins | 33-yard field goal by Knight | 10 | 3 |
| 2 | | | | | Chiefs | 15-yard field goal by Stenerud | 10 | 6 |
| 2 | | | | | Redskins | Taylor 36-yard touchdown reception from Kilmer, Knight kick good | 17 | 6 |
| 3 | | | | | Chiefs | Taylor 26-yard touchdown reception from Dawson, Stenerud kick good | 17 | 13 |
| 4 | | | | | Redskins | 23-yard field goal by Knight | 20 | 13 |
| 4 | | | | | Chiefs | Wright 15-yard touchdown reception from Dawson, Wright kick good | 20 | 20 |
| 4 | | | | | Chiefs | Taylor 28-yard touchdown reception from Dawson, Stenerud kick good | 20 | 27 |
| "TOP" = time of possession. For other American football terms, see Glossary of American football. | | | | | | | 20 | 27 |

- Time of game:

| Redskins | Game Statistics | Chiefs |
|---|---|---|
| 16 | First downs | 20 |
| 25–99 | Rushes–yards | 39–162 |
| 220 | Passing yards | 203 |
| 15–38–1 | Passes | 10–23–2 |
| 2–15 | Sacked–yards | 5–40 |
| 205 | Net passing yards | 163 |
| 304 | Total yards | 325 |
| 176 | Return yards | 131 |
| 4–44.0 | Punts | 5–47.8 |
| 2–1 | Fumbles–lost | 0–0 |
| 8–72 | Penalties–yards | 2–20 |

=== Week 7 (Sunday, October 31, 1971): vs. New Orleans Saints ===
Week 7: New Orleans Saints 14 at Washington Redskins 24 – Game summary

| Quarter | 1 | 2 | 3 | 4 | Total |
|---|---|---|---|---|---|
| Saints (2–4–1) | 0 | 0 | 0 | 14 | 14 |
| Redskins (6–1) | 0 | 17 | 0 | 7 | 24 |

at RFK Stadium • Washington, D.C.

- Date: October 31, 1971
- Game time: 1:00 p.m. EST
- Game weather: 68 °F (20 °C); relative humidity 91%; wind 5 miles per hour (8.0 km/h; 4.3 kn) (Overcast)
- Game attendance: 53,041
- Referee: Jim Tunney
- TV announcers (CBS): Jack Whitaker (play-by-play), Tom Brookshier (color commentator) and Dick Stockton (studio reporter)

| Team | Category | Player | Statistics |
|---|---|---|---|
| NO | Passing | Edd Hargett | 9/21, 134 YDS, 1 INT |
| NO | Rushing | James Ford | 15 CAR, 64 YDS, 1 TD |
| NO | Receiving | Al Dodd | 3 REC, 59 YDS |
| WAS | Passing | Billy Kilmer | 13/22, 204 YDS, 1 TD, 2 INTs |
| WAS | Rushing | Larry Brown | 20 CAR, 113 YDS |
| WAS | Receiving | Boyd Dowler | 5 REC, 71 YDS |

Scoring summary

| Quarter | Time | Drive | | | Team | Scoring information | Score | |
| Quarter | Time | Plays | Yards | TOP | Team | Scoring information | NO | WAS |
|---|---|---|---|---|---|---|---|---|
| 2 | | | | | Redskins | Kilmer 1-yard touchdown run, Knight kick good | 0 | 7 |
| 2 | | | | | Redskins | Brown 36-yard touchdown reception from Kilmer, Knight kick good | 0 | 14 |
| 2 | | | | | Redskins | 47-yard field goal by Knight | 0 | 17 |
| 4 | | | | | Saints | Ford 1-yard touchdown run, Durkee kick good | 7 | 17 |
| 4 | | — | — | — | Redskins | Interception returned 53 yards for touchdown by Fischer, Knight kick good | 7 | 24 |
| 4 | | | | | Saints | Gresham 1-yard touchdown run, Durkee kick good | 14 | 24 |
| "TOP" = time of possession. For other American football terms, see Glossary of American football. | | | | | | | 14 | 24 |

- Time of game:

| Saints | Game Statistics | Redskins |
|---|---|---|
| 16 | First downs | 21 |
| 31–106 | Rushes–yards | 37–173 |
| 163 | Passing yards | 204 |
| 12–27–1 | Passes | 13–22–2 |
| 6–57 | Sacked–yards | 0–0 |
| 106 | Net passing yards | 204 |
| 212 | Total yards | 377 |
| 91 | Return yards | 137 |
| 9–42.9 | Punts | 2–40.0 |
| 2–0 | Fumbles–lost | 4–4 |
| 13–123 | Penalties–yards | 6–61 |

=== Week 8 (Sunday, November 7, 1971): vs. Philadelphia Eagles ===
Week 8: Philadelphia Eagles 7 at Washington Redskins 7 – Game summary

| Quarter | 1 | 2 | 3 | 4 | Total |
|---|---|---|---|---|---|
| Eagles (2–5–1) | 0 | 0 | 7 | 0 | 7 |
| Redskins (6–1–1) | 0 | 0 | 0 | 7 | 7 |

at RFK Stadium • Washington, D.C.

- Date: November 7, 1971
- Game time: 1:00 p.m. EST
- Game weather: 47 °F (8 °C); relative humidity 56%; wind 17 miles per hour (27 km/h; 15 kn) (Cloudy)
- Game attendance: 53,041
- Referee: Fred Silva
- TV announcers (CBS): Jack Whitaker (play-by-play), Tom Brookshier (color commentator) and Andy Musser (studio reporter)

| Team | Category | Player | Statistics |
|---|---|---|---|
| PHI | Passing | Pete Liske | 6/9, 95 YDS, 1 TD |
| PHI | Rushing | Sonny Davis | 14 CAR, 47 YDS |
| PHI | Receiving | Harold Jackson | 2 REC, 47 YDS |
| WAS | Passing | Billy Kilmer | 12/24, 153 YDS, 1 TD, 4 INTs |
| WAS | Rushing | Larry Brown | 22 CAR, 43 YDS |
| WAS | Receiving | Boyd Dowler | 5 REC, 67 YDS |

Scoring summary

| Quarter | Time | Drive | | | Team | Scoring information | Score | |
| Quarter | Time | Plays | Yards | TOP | Team | Scoring information | PHI | WAS |
|---|---|---|---|---|---|---|---|---|
| 3 | | | | | Eagles | Bull 12-yard touchdown reception from Liske, Feller kick good | 7 | 0 |
| 4 | | | | | Redskins | McNeil 32-yard touchdown reception from Kilmer, Knight kick good | 7 | 7 |
| "TOP" = time of possession. For other American football terms, see Glossary of American football. | | | | | | | 7 | 7 |

- Time of game:

| Eagles | Game Statistics | Redskins |
|---|---|---|
| 10 | First downs | 14 |
| 31–77 | Rushes–yards | 31–61 |
| 124 | Passing yards | 153 |
| 10–22–1 | Passes | 12–24–4 |
| 3–29 | Sacked–yards | 4–17 |
| 95 | Net passing yards | 136 |
| 172 | Total yards | 197 |
| 86 | Return yards | 108 |
| 7–37.4 | Punts | 5–43.8 |
| 2–0 | Fumbles–lost | 4–3 |
| 11–97 | Penalties–yards | 9–78 |

=== Week 9 (Sunday, November 14, 1971): at Chicago Bears ===
Week 9: Washington Redskins 15 at Chicago Bears 16 – Game summary

| Quarter | 1 | 2 | 3 | 4 | Total |
|---|---|---|---|---|---|
| Redskins (6–2–1) | 6 | 6 | 3 | 0 | 15 |
| Bears (6–3) | 0 | 3 | 3 | 10 | 16 |

at Soldier Field • Chicago, Illinois

- Date: November 14, 1971
- Game time: 2:00 p.m. EDT
- Game weather: 56 °F (13 °C); relative humidity 75%; wind 17 miles per hour (27 km/h; 15 kn) (Clear)
- Game attendance: 55,049
- Referee: Tommy Bell
- TV announcers (CBS): Jack Whitaker (play-by-play), Tom Brookshier (color commentator) and Bruce Roberts (studio reporter)

| Team | Category | Player | Statistics |
|---|---|---|---|
| WAS | Passing | Billy Kilmer | 20/30, 163 YDS |
| WAS | Rushing | Tommy Mason | 11 CAR, 42 YDS |
| WAS | Receiving | Tommy Mason | 9 REC, 79 YDS |
| CHI | Passing | Bobby Douglass | 15/33, 214 YDS |
| CHI | Rushing | Bobby Douglass | 10 CAR, 88 YDS |
| CHI | Receiving | Don Shy | 5 CAR, 57 YDS |

Scoring summary

| Quarter | Time | Drive | | | Team | Scoring information | Score | |
| Quarter | Time | Plays | Yards | TOP | Team | Scoring information | WAS | CHI |
|---|---|---|---|---|---|---|---|---|
| 1 | | | | | Redskins | 30-yard field goal by Knight | 3 | 0 |
| 1 | | | | | Redskins | 12-yard field goal by Knight | 6 | 0 |
| 2 | | | | | Bears | 15-yard field goal by Percival | 6 | 3 |
| 2 | | | | | Redskins | 37-yard field goal by Knight | 9 | 3 |
| 2 | | | | | Redskins | 9-yard field goal by Knight | 12 | 3 |
| 3 | | | | | Redskins | 27-yard field goal by Knight | 15 | 3 |
| 3 | | | | | Bears | 42-yard field goal by Percival | 15 | 6 |
| 4 | | | | | Bears | 9-yard field goal by Percival | 15 | 9 |
| 4 | | | | | Bears | Pinder 40-yard touchdown run, Butkus kick good | 15 | 16 |
| "TOP" = time of possession. For other American football terms, see Glossary of American football. | | | | | | | 15 | 16 |

- Time of game:

| Redskins | Game Statistics | Bears |
|---|---|---|
| 15 | First downs | 20 |
| 28–88 | Rushes–yards | 34–205 |
| 206 | Passing yards | 214 |
| 24–36–0 | Passes | 15–33–0 |
| 2–11 | Sacked–yards | 5–34 |
| 195 | Net passing yards | 180 |
| 283 | Total yards | 385 |
| 100 | Return yards | 57 |
| 5–32.8 | Punts | 4–40.3 |
| 0–0 | Fumbles–lost | 1–1 |
| 2–10 | Penalties–yards | 6–44 |

=== Week 10 (Sunday, November 21, 1971): vs. Dallas Cowboys ===
Week 10: Dallas Cowboys 13 at Washington Redskins 0 – Game summary

| Quarter | 1 | 2 | 3 | 4 | Total |
|---|---|---|---|---|---|
| Cowboys (7–3) | 7 | 0 | 3 | 3 | 13 |
| Redskins (6–3–1) | 0 | 0 | 0 | 0 | 0 |

at RFK Stadium • Washington, D.C.

- Date: November 21, 1971
- Game time: 1:00 p.m. EST
- Game weather: 41 °F (5 °C); relative humidity 65%; wind 14 miles per hour (23 km/h; 12 kn) (Cloudy)
- Game attendance: 53,041
- Referee: Dick Jorgensen
- TV announcers (CBS): Frank Glieber (play-by-play), Eddie LeBaron (color commentator) and Frank Clarke (studio reporter)

| Team | Category | Player | Statistics |
|---|---|---|---|
| DAL | Passing | Roger Staubach | 11/21, 151 YDS |
| DAL | Rushing | Duane Thomas | 20 CAR, 53 YDS |
| DAL | Receiving | Walt Garrison | 4 REC, 48 YDS |
| WAS | Passing | Billy Kilmer | 10/16, 118 YDS |
| WAS | Rushing | Larry Brown; Charley Harraway | 11 CAR, 27 YDS; 9 CAR, 27 YDS |
| WAS | Receiving | Boyd Dowler | 5 REC, 52 YDS |

Scoring summary

| Quarter | Time | Drive | | | Team | Scoring information | Score | |
| Quarter | Time | Plays | Yards | TOP | Team | Scoring information | DAL | WAS |
|---|---|---|---|---|---|---|---|---|
| 1 | | | | | Cowboys | Staubach 1-yard touchdown run, Clark kick good | 7 | 0 |
| 3 | | | | | Cowboys | 48-yard field goal by Clark | 10 | 0 |
| 4 | | | | | Cowboys | 48-yard field goal by Clark | 13 | 0 |
| "TOP" = time of possession. For other American football terms, see Glossary of American football. | | | | | | | 13 | 0 |

- Point spread: Redskins +1
- Time of game:

| Cowboys | Game Statistics | Redskins |
|---|---|---|
| 16 | First downs | 15 |
| 37–146 | Rushes–yards | 21–65 |
| 151 | Passing yards | 194 |
| 11–21–0 | Passes | 19–32–2 |
| 3–18 | Sacked–yards | 3–27 |
| 133 | Net passing yards | 167 |
| 279 | Total yards | 232 |
| 37 | Return yards | 101 |
| 4–38.0 | Punts | 4–43.3 |
| 2–1 | Fumbles–lost | 1–0 |
| 6–30 | Penalties–yards | 3–50 |

Individual stats

Redskins Passing
| | C/ATT^{1} | Yds | TD | INT | Sk | Yds | LG^{3} | Rate |
|---|---|---|---|---|---|---|---|---|
| Kilmer | 10/16 | 118 | 0 | 0 | 3 | 18 | 28 | 75.7 |
| Jurgensen | 9/16 | 76 | 0 | 2 | 1 | 8 | 15 | 29.2 |

Redskins Rushing
| | Car^{2} | Yds | TD | LG^{3} |
|---|---|---|---|---|
| Brown | 11 | 27 | 0 | 5 |
| Harraway | 9 | 27 | 0 | 9 |
| Jurgensen | 1 | 11 | 0 | 11 |

Redskins Receiving
| | Rec^{4} | Yds | TD | LG^{3} |
|---|---|---|---|---|
| Dowler | 5 | 52 | 0 | 17 |
| Harraway | 4 | 16 | 0 | 11 |
| Jefferson | 3 | 51 | 0 | 33 |
| Brown | 3 | 41 | 0 | 17 |
| Mason | 3 | 30 | 0 | 11 |
| McNeil | 1 | 4 | 0 | 4 |

Redskins Kick Returns
| | Ret | Yds | Y/Rt | TD | Lng |
|---|---|---|---|---|---|
| Duncan | 2 | 54 | 27.0 | 0 | 0 |
| Jaqua | 1 | 16 | 16.0 | 0 | 0 |

Redskins Punt Returns
| | Ret | Yds | Y/Rt | TD | Lng |
|---|---|---|---|---|---|
| Duncan | 2 | 31 | 15.5 | 0 | 0 |

Redskins Punting
| | Pnt | Yds | Y/P | Lng | Blck |
|---|---|---|---|---|---|
| Bragg | 4 | 173 | 43.3 | 50 | |

Redskins Kicking
| | XPM–XPA | FGM–FGA | MFG |
|---|---|---|---|
| Knight | | 0–1 | 22 |

Starting Lineups

| Position | Starting Lineups: Week 10 – vs. Dallas |
|---|---|
Offense
| WR | Charley Taylor |
| LT | Jim Snowden |
| LG | Ray Schoenke |
| C | Len Hauss |
| RG | John Wilbur |
| RT | Walt Rock |
| TE | Jerry Smith |
| WR | Roy Jefferson |
| QB | Billy Kilmer |
| FB | Charley Harraway |
| RB | Larry Brown |
Defense
| LDE | Ron McDole |
| LDT | Manny Sistrunk |
| RDT | Diron Talbert |
| RDE | Verlon Biggs |
| LLB | Jack Pardee |
| MLB | Myron Pottios |
| RLB | Chris Hanburger |
| LCB | Pat Fischer |
| RCB | Mike Bass |
| SS | Jon Jaqua |
| FS | Brig Owens |

=== Week 11 (Sunday, November 28, 1971): at Philadelphia Eagles ===
Week 11: Washington Redskins 20 at Philadelphia Eagles 13 – Game summary

| Quarter | 1 | 2 | 3 | 4 | Total |
|---|---|---|---|---|---|
| Redskins (7–3–1) | 0 | 13 | 0 | 7 | 20 |
| Eagles (3–7–1) | 0 | 0 | 6 | 7 | 13 |

at Veterans Stadium • Philadelphia, Pennsylvania

- Date: November 28, 1971
- Game time: 1:00 p.m. EST
- Game weather: 43 °F (6 °C); relative humidity 70%; wind 12 miles per hour (19 km/h; 10 kn) (Partly cloudy)
- Game attendance: 65,358
- Referee: Ben Dreith
- TV announcers (CBS): Jack Whitaker (play-by-play), Tom Brookshier (color commentator) and Andy Musser (studio reporter)

| Team | Category | Player | Statistics |
|---|---|---|---|
| WAS | Passing | Billy Kilmer | 7/13. 104 YDS, 1 TD |
| WAS | Rushing | Charley Harraway | 9 CAR, 47 YDS |
| WAS | Receiving | Clifton McNeil | 5 REC, 58 YDS |
| PHI | Passing | Pete Liske | 13/28, 192 YDS, 1 TD, 2 INTs |
| PHI | Rushing | Ronnie Bull | 14 CAR, 73 YDS |
| PHI | Receiving | Ben Hawkins | 7 REC, 126 YDS |

Scoring summary

| Quarter | Time | Drive | | | Team | Scoring information | Score | |
| Quarter | Time | Plays | Yards | TOP | Team | Scoring information | WAS | PHI |
|---|---|---|---|---|---|---|---|---|
| 2 | | | | | Redskins | 40-yard field goal by Knight | 3 | 0 |
| 2 | | | | | Redskins | 14-yard field goal by Knight | 6 | 0 |
| 2 | | | | | Redskins | Jefferson 27-yard touchdown reception from Kilmer, Knight kick good | 13 | 0 |
| 3 | | | | | Eagles | Bailey 1-yard touchdown run, Dempsey kick no good | 13 | 6 |
| 4 | | — | — | — | Redskins | Interception returned 38 yards for touchdown by Bass, Knight kick good | 20 | 7 |
| 4 | | | | | Eagles | Zabel 1-yard touchdown reception from Liske, Dempsey kick good | 20 | 13 |
| "TOP" = time of possession. For other American football terms, see Glossary of American football. | | | | | | | 20 | 13 |

- Time of game:

| Redskins | Game Statistics | Eagles |
|---|---|---|
| 10 | First downs | 16 |
| 28–102 | Rushes–yards | 27–100 |
| 155 | Passing yards | 192 |
| 10–19–0 | Passes | 13–28–2 |
| 0–0 | Sacked–yards | 1–12 |
| 155 | Net passing yards | 180 |
| 257 | Total yards | 280 |
| 127 | Return yards | 120 |
| 4–43.5 | Punts | 6–40.2 |
| 4–2 | Fumbles–lost | 0–0 |
| 7–68 | Penalties–yards | 9–79 |

=== Week 12 (Sunday, December 5, 1971): vs. New York Giants ===
Week 12: New York Giants 7 at Washington Redskins 23 – Game summary

| Quarter | 1 | 2 | 3 | 4 | Total |
|---|---|---|---|---|---|
| Giants (4–8) | 0 | 0 | 0 | 7 | 7 |
| Redskins (8–3–1) | 13 | 7 | 3 | 0 | 23 |

at RFK Stadium • Washington, D.C.

- Date: December 5, 1971
- Game time: 1:00 p.m. EST
- Game weather: 29 °F (−2 °C); relative humidity 86%; wind 7 miles per hour (11 km/h; 6.1 kn); wind chill 21 °F (−6 °C)
- Game attendance: 53,041
- Referee: Bob Frederic
- TV announcers (CBS): Ray Scott (play-by-play), Pat Summerall (color commentator) and Bill Mazer (studio reporter)

| Team | Category | Player | Statistics |
|---|---|---|---|
| NYG | Passing | Fran Tarkenton | 15/31, 162 YDS, 4 INTs |
| NYG | Rushing | Junior Coffey | 9 CAR, 40 YDS |
| NYG | Receiving | Bob Tucker | 5 REC, 69 YDS |
| WAS | Passing | Billy Kilmer | 4/14, 54 YDS, 1 INT |
| WAS | Rushing | Larry Brown | 25 CAR, 129 YDS, 2 TDs |
| WAS | Receiving | Jerry Smith | 1 REC, 27 YDS |

Scoring summary

| Quarter | Time | Drive | | | Team | Scoring information | Score | |
| Quarter | Time | Plays | Yards | TOP | Team | Scoring information | NYG | WAS |
|---|---|---|---|---|---|---|---|---|
| 1 | | | | | Redskins | 28-yard field goal by Knight | 0 | 3 |
| 1 | | | | | Redskins | 25-yard field goal by Knight | 0 | 6 |
| 1 | | | | | Redskins | Brown 17-yard touchdown run, Knight kick good | 0 | 13 |
| 2 | | | | | Redskins | Brown 2-yard touchdown run, Knight kick good | 0 | 20 |
| 3 | | | | | Redskins | 44-yard field goal by Knight | 0 | 23 |
| 4 | | — | — | — | Giants | Fumble recovery returned 0 yards for touchdown by Brown, Gogolak kick good | 7 | 23 |
| "TOP" = time of possession. For other American football terms, see Glossary of American football. | | | | | | | 7 | 23 |

- Point spread: Redskins –7
- Time of game:

| Giants | Game Statistics | Redskins |
|---|---|---|
| 15 | First downs | 9 |
| 27–89 | Rushes–yards | 36–155 |
| 173 | Passing yards | 54 |
| 16–33–5 | Passes | 4–14–1 |
| 1–8 | Sacked–yards | 3–19 |
| 165 | Net passing yards | 35 |
| 254 | Total yards | 190 |
| 97 | Return yards | 163 |
| 3–37.0 | Punts | 4–28.8 |
| 2–0 | Fumbles–lost | 2–0 |
| 3–39 | Penalties–yards | 6–67 |

Individual stats

Redskins Passing
| | C/ATT^{1} | Yds | TD | INT | Sk | Yds | LG^{3} | Rate |
|---|---|---|---|---|---|---|---|---|
| Kilmer | 4/14 | 54 | 0 | 1 | 3 | 19 | 27 | 13.4 |

Redskins Rushing
| | Car^{2} | Yds | TD | LG^{3} |
|---|---|---|---|---|
| Brown | 25 | 129 | 2 | 34 |
| Harraway | 7 | 17 | 0 | 9 |
| Brunet | 2 | 6 | 0 | 5 |
| Mason | 1 | 3 | 0 | 3 |
| Kilmer | 1 | 0 | 0 | 0 |

Redskins Receiving
| | Rec^{4} | Yds | TD | LG^{3} |
|---|---|---|---|---|
| Smith | 1 | 27 | 0 | 27 |
| Harraway | 1 | 14 | 0 | 14 |
| McNeil | 1 | 13 | 0 | 13 |
| Brown | 1 | 0 | 0 | 0 |

Redskins Kick Returns
| | Ret | Yds | Y/Rt | TD | Lng |
|---|---|---|---|---|---|
| Duncan | 2 | 52 | 26.0 | 0 | 0 |

Redskins Punt Returns
| | Ret | Yds | Y/Rt | TD | Lng |
|---|---|---|---|---|---|
| Vactor | 3 | 19 | 6.3 | 0 | 0 |

Redskins Punting
| | Pnt | Yds | Y/P | Lng | Blck |
|---|---|---|---|---|---|
| Bragg | 4 | 115 | 28.8 | 47 | |

Redskins Kicking
| | XPM–XPA | FGM–FGA | MFG |
|---|---|---|---|
| Knight | 2–2 | 3–5 | |

Redskins Interceptions
| | Int | Yds | TD | LG | PD |
|---|---|---|---|---|---|
| Pottios | 1 | 31 | 0 | 31 | |
| Bass | 1 | 25 | 0 | 25 | |
| Owens | 1 | 19 | 0 | 19 | |
| Hanburger | 1 | 17 | 0 | 17 | |
| McDole | 1 | 0 | 0 | 0 | |

Starting Lineups

| Position | Starting Lineups: Week 12 – vs. N.Y. Giants |
|---|---|
Offense
| WR | Charley Taylor |
| LT | Jim Snowden |
| LG | Ray Schoenke |
| C | Len Hauss |
| RG | John Wilbur |
| RT | Walt Rock |
| TE | Jerry Smith |
| WR | Roy Jefferson |
| QB | Billy Kilmer |
| FB | Charley Harraway |
| RB | Larry Brown |
Defense
| LDE | Ron McDole |
| LDT | Manny Sistrunk |
| RDT | Diron Talbert |
| RDE | Verlon Biggs |
| LLB | Jack Pardee |
| MLB | Myron Pottios |
| RLB | Chris Hanburger |
| LCB | Pat Fischer |
| RCB | Mike Bass |
| SS | Richie Petitbon |
| FS | Brig Owens |

=== Week 13 (Monday, December 13, 1971): at Los Angeles Rams ===
Week 13: Washington Redskins 38 at Los Angeles Rams 24 – Game summary

| Quarter | 1 | 2 | 3 | 4 | Total |
|---|---|---|---|---|---|
| Redskins (9–3–1) | 7 | 17 | 7 | 7 | 38 |
| Rams (7–5–1) | 10 | 0 | 7 | 7 | 24 |

at Los Angeles Memorial Coliseum • Los Angeles, California

- Date: December 13, 1971
- Game time: 9:00 p.m. EST
- Game weather: 51 °F (11 °C); relative humidity 68%; wind 15 miles per hour (24 km/h; 13 kn) (Clear)
- Game attendance: 80,402
- Referee: Jim Tunney
- TV announcers (ABC): Frank Gifford (play-by-play), Howard Cosell (color commentator) and Don Meredith (color commentator)

| Team | Category | Player | Statistics |
|---|---|---|---|
| WAS | Passing | Billy Kilmer | 14/19, 246 YDS, 3 TDs, 1 INT |
| WAS | Rushing | Larry Brown | 27 CAR, 42 YDS, 1 TD |
| WAS | Receiving | Roy Jefferson | 8 REC, 137 YDS, 2 TDs |
| LA | Passing | Roman Gabriel | 17/44, 219 YDS, 1 TD, 3 INTs |
| LA | Rushing | Larry Smith | 13 CAR, 49 YDS |
| LA | Receiving | Larry Smith | 6 REC, 48 YDS |

Scoring summary

| Quarter | Time | Drive | | | Team | Scoring information | Score | |
| Quarter | Time | Plays | Yards | TOP | Team | Scoring information | WAS | LA |
|---|---|---|---|---|---|---|---|---|
| 1 | | — | — | — | Rams | Interception returned 82 yards for touchdown by Alexander, Ray kick good | 0 | 7 |
| 1 | | | | | Redskins | Jefferson 70-yard touchdown reception from Kilmer, Knight kick good | 7 | 7 |
| 1 | | | | | Ramss | 32-yard field goal by Ray | 7 | 10 |
| 3 | | | | | Redskins | 52-yard field goal by Knight | 10 | 10 |
| 2 | | | | | Redskins | McNeil 32-yard touchdown reception from Kilmer, Knight kick good | 17 | 10 |
| 2 | | | | | Redskins | Brown 1-yard touchdown run, Knight kick good | 24 | 10 |
| 3 | | | | | Redskins | Jefferson 5-yard touchdown reception from Kilmer, Knight kick good | 31 | 10 |
| 3 | | | | | Rams | Klein 3-yard touchdown reception from Gabriel, Ray kick good | 31 | 17 |
| 4 | | | | | Rams | Ellison 2-yard touchdown run, Ray kick good | 31 | 24 |
| 4 | | — | — | — | Redskins | Interception returned 46 yards for touchdown by Duncan, Knight kick good | 38 | 24 |
| "TOP" = time of possession. For other American football terms, see Glossary of American football. | | | | | | | 38 | 24 |

- Time of game:

| Redskins | Game Statistics | Rams |
|---|---|---|
| 15 | First downs | 17 |
| 40–79 | Rushes–yards | 27–104 |
| 246 | Passing yards | 219 |
| 14–19–1 | Passes | 17–44–3 |
| 1–6 | Sacked–yards | 1–5 |
| 240 | Net passing yards | 214 |
| 319 | Total yards | 318 |
| 99 | Return yards | 145 |
| 5–43.8 | Punts | 4–39.3 |
| 2–2 | Fumbles–lost | 1–1 |
| 3–31 | Penalties–yards | 8–51 |

=== Week 14 (Sunday, December 19, 1971): vs. Cleveland Browns ===
Week 14: Cleveland Browns 20 at Washington Redskins 13 – Game summary

| Quarter | 1 | 2 | 3 | 4 | Total |
|---|---|---|---|---|---|
| Browns (9–5) | 3 | 7 | 3 | 7 | 20 |
| Redskins (9–4–1) | 0 | 13 | 0 | 0 | 13 |

at RFK Stadium • Washington, D.C.

- Date: December 19, 1971
- Game time: 1:00 p.m. EST
- Game weather: 27 °F (−3 °C); relative humidity 66%; wind 10 miles per hour (16 km/h; 8.7 kn); wind chill 18 °F (−8 °C) (Overcast)
- Game attendance: 53,041
- Referee: Norm Schachter
- TV announcers (NBC): Charlie Jones (play-by-play) and Johnny Morris (color commentator)

| Team | Category | Player | Statistics |
|---|---|---|---|
| CLE | Passing | Bill Nelsen | 15/23, 165 YDS, 2 TDs, 2 INTs |
| CLE | Rushing | Leroy Kelly | 18 CAR, 50 YDS |
| CLE | Receiving | Milt Morin | 3 REC, 40 YDS |
| WAS | Passing | Billy Kilmer | 18/33, 229 YDS, 1 TD, 2 INTs |
| WAS | Rushing | Larry Brown | 26 CAR, 81 YDS |
| WAS | Receiving | Larry Brown | 4 REC, 69 YDS, 1 TD |

Scoring summary

| Quarter | Time | Drive | | | Team | Scoring information | Score | |
| Quarter | Time | Plays | Yards | TOP | Team | Scoring information | CLE | WAS |
|---|---|---|---|---|---|---|---|---|
| 1 | | | | | Browns | 30-yard field goal by Cockroft | 3 | 0 |
| 2 | | | | | Redskins | 18-yard field goal by Knight | 3 | 3 |
| 2 | | | | | Browns | Collins 17-yard touchdown reception from Nelsen, Cockroft kick good | 10 | 3 |
| 2 | | | | | Redskins | Brown 29-yard touchdown reception from Kilmer, Knight kick good | 10 | 10 |
| 2 | | | | | Redskins | 35-yard field goal by Knight | 10 | 13 |
| 3 | | | | | Browns | 22-yard field goal by Cockroft | 13 | 13 |
| 4 | | | | | Browns | Glass 4-yard touchdown reception from Nelsen, Cockroft kick good | 20 | 13 |
| "TOP" = time of possession. For other American football terms, see Glossary of American football. | | | | | | | 20 | 13 |

- Time of game:

| Browns | Game Statistics | Redskins |
|---|---|---|
| 13 | First downs | 22 |
| 28–69 | Rushes–yards | 35–117 |
| 165 | Passing yards | 229 |
| 15–23–2 | Passes | 18–33–2 |
| 1–11 | Sacked–yards | 0–0 |
| 154 | Net passing yards | 229 |
| 223 | Total yards | 346 |
| 115 | Return yards | 186 |
| 4–37.3 | Punts | 1–46.0 |
| 1–0 | Fumbles–lost | 3–2 |
| 4–20 | Penalties–yards | 3–23 |

== Stats ==
Passing

Passing
| Player | Pos | G | GS | QBrec | Cmp | Att | Cmp% | Yds | TD | TD% | Int | Int% | Y/A | AY/A | Y/C | Y/G | Lng | Rate | Sk | Yds | NY/A | ANY/A | Sk% | 4QC | GWD |
|---|---|---|---|---|---|---|---|---|---|---|---|---|---|---|---|---|---|---|---|---|---|---|---|---|---|
| Kilmer | QB | 14 | 13 | 8–4–1 | 166 | 306 | 54.2 | 2221 | 13 | 4.2 | 13 | 4.2 | 71 | 7.3 | 6.2 | 13.4 | 158.6 | 74.0 | 16 | 110 | 5 | 6.56 | 5.55 | 1 | 0 |
| Jurgensen | QB | 5 | 1 | 1–0–0 | 16 | 28 | 57.1 | 170 | 0 | 0.0 | 2 | 7.1 | 30 | 6.1 | 2.9 | 10.6 | 34.0 | 45.2 | 1 | 8 | 3.4 | 5.59 | 2.48 | | |
| Team Total | | 14 | | 9–4–1 | 182 | 334 | 54.5 | 2391 | 13 | 3.9 | 15 | 4.5 | 71 | 7.2 | 5.9 | 13.1 | 170.8 | 71.6 | 17 | 118 | 4.8 | 6.48 | 5.29 | 1 | 0 |
| Opp Total | | 14 | | | 191 | 411 | 46.5 | 2448 | 11 | 2.7 | 29 | 7.1 | | 6.0 | 3.32 | 12.8 | 174.9 | 45.1 | 36 | 321 | 8.1 | 4.8 | 2.3 | | |

Rushing

Rushing
| Player | Pos | G | GS | Att | Yds | TD | Lng | Y/A | Y/G | A/G |
|---|---|---|---|---|---|---|---|---|---|---|
| Brown | RB | 13 | 13 | 253 | 948 | 4 | 34 | 3.7 | 72.9 | 19.5 |
| Harraway | FB | 14 | 14 | 156 | 635 | 2 | 57 | 4.1 | 45.4 | 11.1 |
| Mason | RB | 10 | 1 | 31 | 85 | 0 | 11 | 2.7 | 8.5 | 3.1 |
| Jurgensen | QB | 5 | 1 | 3 | 29 | 0 | 11 | 9.7 | 5.8 | 0.6 |
| Burnet | RB | 7 | 0 | 10 | 27 | 0 | 5 | 2.7 | 3.9 | 1.4 |
| Jefferson | WR | 14 | 14 | 2 | 13 | 0 | 13 | 6.5 | 0.9 | 0.1 |
| Hull | RB | 11 | 0 | 2 | 8 | 0 | 6 | 4.0 | 0.7 | 0.2 |
| Kilmer | QB | 14 | 13 | 17 | 5 | 2 | 3 | 0.3 | 0.4 | 1.2 |
| Smith | TE | 8 | 7 | 1 | 5 | 0 | 5 | 5.0 | 0.6 | 0.1 |
| Wyche | QB | 1 | 0 | 1 | 4 | 0 | 4 | 4.0 | 4.0 | 1.0 |
| Petitbon | SS | 14 | 13 | 1 | –2 | 0 | –2 | –2.0 | –0.1 | 0.1 |
| Team Total | | 14 | | 477 | 1757 | 8 | 57 | 3.7 | 125.5 | 34.1 |
| Opp Total | | 14 | | 408 | 1396 | 7 | | 3.4 | 99.7 | 29.1 |

Receiving

Receiving
| Player | Pos | G | GS | Rec | Yds | Y/R | TD | Lng | R/G | Y/G | Ctch% |
|---|---|---|---|---|---|---|---|---|---|---|---|
| Jefferson | WR | 14 | 14 | 47 | 701 | 14.9 | 4 | 70 | 3.4 | 50.1 | 0.0% |
| Dowler | WR | 12 | 7 | 26 | 352 | 13.5 | 0 | 30 | 2.2 | 29.3 | 0.0% |
| Taylor | WR | 6 | 6 | 24 | 370 | 15.4 | 4 | 71 | 4.0 | 61.7 | 0.0% |
| Harraway | FB | 14 | 14 | 20 | 121 | 6.1 | 0 | 20 | 1.4 | 8.6 | 0.0% |
| Smith | TE | 8 | 7 | 16 | 227 | 14.2 | 1 | 31 | 2.0 | 28.4 | 0.0% |
| Brown | RB | 13 | 13 | 16 | 176 | 11.0 | 2 | 36 | 1.2 | 13.5 | 0.0% |
| McNeil | WR | 8 | 1 | 14 | 244 | 17.4 | 2 | 36 | 1.8 | 30.5 | 0.0% |
| Mason | RB | 10 | 1 | 12 | 109 | 9.1 | 0 | 18 | 1.2 | 10.9 | 0.0% |
| Alston | TE | 12 | 7 | 5 | 87 | 17.4 | 0 | 21 | 0.4 | 7.3 | 0.0% |
| Brunet | RB | 7 | 0 | 2 | 4 | 2.0 | 0 | 5 | 0.3 | 0.6 | 0.0% |
| Team Total | | 14 | | 182 | 2391 | 13.1 | 13 | 71 | 13.0 | 170.8 | |
| Opp Total | | 14 | | 191 | 2127 | 11.1 | 11 | | 13.6 | 151.9 | |

Kicking

Kicking
| | | Games | | 0–19 | | 20–29 | | 30–39 | | 40–49 | | 50+ | | Scoring | | | | | | |
| Player | Pos | G | GS | FGA | FGM | FGA | FGM | FGA | FGM | FGA | FGM | FGA | FGM | FGA | FGM | Lng | FG% | XPA | XPM | XP% |
|---|---|---|---|---|---|---|---|---|---|---|---|---|---|---|---|---|---|---|---|---|
| Knight | K | 14 | 0 | 12 | 10 | 9 | 6 | 14 | 8 | 11 | 3 | 3 | 2 | 49 | 29 | 52 | 59.2% | 27 | 27 | 100.0% |
| Team Total | | 14 | | 12 | 10 | 9 | 6 | 14 | 8 | 11 | 3 | 3 | 2 | 49 | 29 | | 59.2% | 27 | 27 | 100.0% |
| Opp Total | | 14 | | | | | | | | | | | | 33 | 17 | | 51.5% | 20 | 19 | 95.0% |

Punting

Punting
| Player | Pos | G | GS | Pnt | Yds | Lng | Blck | Y/P |
|---|---|---|---|---|---|---|---|---|
| Bragg | P | 14 | 0 | 58 | 2348 | 59 | 1 | 40.5 |
| Team Total | | 14 | | 58 | 2348 | 59 | 1 | 40.5 |
| Opp Total | | 14 | | 77 | 3172 | | | 41.2 |

Kick Return

Kick return
| Player | Pos | G | GS | Rt | Yds | TD | Lng | Y/Rt |
|---|---|---|---|---|---|---|---|---|
| Duncan | DB | 14 | 0 | 22 | 233 | 0 | 33 | 10.6 |
| Vactor | DB | 14 | 0 | 23 | 194 | 0 | 30 | 8.4 |
| Team Total | | 14 | | 45 | 427 | 0 | 33 | 9.5 |
| Opp Total | | 14 | | 17 | 87 | 0 | | 5.1 |

Punt Return

Punt return
| Player | Pos | G | GS | Ret | Yds | TD | Lng | Y/R |
|---|---|---|---|---|---|---|---|---|
| Duncan | DB | 14 | 0 | 27 | 724 | 0 | 48 | 26.8 |
| Jaqua | DB | 14 | 1 | 6 | 78 | 0 | 19 | 13.0 |
| McLinton | LB | 14 | 0 | 5 | 46 | 0 | 13 | 9.2 |
| Bass | RCB | 14 | 14 | 4 | 61 | 0 | 26 | 15.3 |
| Tillman | LB | 9 | 0 | 1 | 4 | 0 | 4 | 4.0 |
| Team Total | | 14 | | 43 | 913 | 0 | 48 | 21.2 |
| Opp Total | | 14 | | 61 | 1066 | 0 | | 17.5 |

Sacks

Sacks
| Player | Pos | G | GS | Sk |
|---|---|---|---|---|
| Jones | DE | 14 | 1 | 7.5 |
| Biggs | RDE | 13 | 13 | 5.0 |
| Hanburger | RLB | 14 | 14 | 5.0 |
| Talbert | RDT | 14 | 14 | 5.0 |
| Brundige | DT | 14 | 0 | 4.5 |
| McDole | LDE | 14 | 14 | 4.5 |
| Sistrunk | LDT | 14 | 14 | 3.0 |
| Pardee | LLB | 14 | 14 | 1.5 |
| McLinton | LB | 14 | 0 | 0.5 |
| Pottios | MLB | 14 | 14 | 0.5 |
| Team Total | | 14 | | 36 |
| Opp Total | | 14 | | 17 |

Interceptions

Interceptions
| Player | Pos | G | GS | Int | Yds | TD | Lng | PD |
|---|---|---|---|---|---|---|---|---|
| Bass | RCB | 14 | 14 | 8 | 78 | 1 | 38 | |
| Petitbon | SS | 14 | 13 | 5 | 102 | 0 | 42 | |
| Pardee | LLB | 14 | 14 | 5 | 58 | 1 | 20 | |
| Fischer | LCB | 14 | 14 | 3 | 103 | 1 | 53 | |
| McDole | LDE | 14 | 14 | 3 | 18 | 1 | 18 | |
| Owens | FS | 14 | 14 | 2 | 27 | 0 | 19 | |
| Duncan | DB | 14 | 0 | 1 | 46 | 1 | 46 | |
| Pottios | MLB | 14 | 14 | 1 | 31 | 0 | 31 | |
| Hanburger | RLB | 14 | 14 | 1 | 17 | 0 | 17 | |
| Team Total | | 14 | | 29 | 480 | 5 | 53 | |
| Opp Total | | 14 | | | | | | |

Fumbles

Fumbles
| Player | Pos | G | GS | FF | Fmb | FR | Yds | TD |
|---|---|---|---|---|---|---|---|---|
| Brown | RB | 13 | 13 | | 6 | 0 | 0 | 0 |
| Vactor | DB | 14 | 0 | | 5 | 2 | 0 | 0 |
| Duncan | DB | 14 | 0 | | 4 | 0 | 0 | 0 |
| Harraway | FB | 14 | 14 | | 3 | 0 | 0 | 0 |
| Kilmer | QB | 14 | 13 | | 2 | 2 | –3 | 0 |
| Mason | RB | 10 | 1 | | 2 | 1 | 0 | 0 |
| Petitbon | SS | 14 | 13 | | 2 | 3 | –6 | 0 |
| Alston | TE | 12 | 7 | | 1 | 0 | 0 | 0 |
| Brunet | RB | 7 | 0 | | 1 | 0 | 0 | 0 |
| Dowler | WR | 12 | 7 | | 1 | 0 | 0 | 0 |
| Jaqua | DB | 14 | 1 | | 1 | 0 | 0 | 0 |
| Jurgensen | QB | 5 | 1 | | 1 | 0 | 0 | 0 |
| McNeil | WR | 8 | 1 | | 1 | 0 | 0 | 0 |
| Smith | TE | 8 | 7 | | 1 | 0 | 0 | 0 |
| Tillman | LB | 9 | 0 | | 1 | 1 | 0 | 0 |
| Laaveg | G | 14 | 0 | | 0 | 3 | 0 | 0 |
| Hanburger | RLB | 14 | 14 | | 0 | 2 | 16 | 1 |
| Bass | RCB | 14 | 14 | | 0 | 1 | 0 | 0 |
| Hermiling | T | 8 | 0 | | 0 | 1 | 0 | 0 |
| Knight | K | 14 | 0 | | 0 | 1 | 0 | 0 |
| Pardee | LLB | 14 | 14 | | 0 | 1 | 0 | 0 |
| Schoenke | LG | 14 | 14 | | 0 | 1 | 0 | 0 |
| Sistrunk | LDT | 14 | 14 | | 0 | 1 | 0 | 0 |
| Talbert | RDT | 14 | 14 | | 0 | 1 | 0 | 0 |
| Taylor | WR | 6 | 6 | | 0 | 1 | 0 | 0 |
| Wilbur | RG | 14 | 14 | | 0 | 1 | 0 | 0 |
| Team Total | | 14 | | | 32 | 24 | 7 | 1 |
| Opp Total | | 14 | | | 22 | 10 | | 1 |

Tackles

Tackles
| Player | Pos | G | GS | Comb | Solo | Ast | TFL | QBHits | Sfty |
| Team Total | | 14 | | | | | | | |
| Opp Total | | 14 | | | | | | | |

Scoring Summary

Scoring Summary
| Player | Pos | G | GS | RshTD | RecTD | PR TD | KR TD | FblTD | IntTD | OthTD | AllTD | XPM | XPA | FGM | FGA | Sfty | Pts | Pts/G |
|---|---|---|---|---|---|---|---|---|---|---|---|---|---|---|---|---|---|---|
| Knight | K | 14 | 0 | | | | | | | | | 27 | 27 | 29 | 49 | | 114 | 8.1 |
| Brown | RB | 13 | 13 | 4 | 2 | | | | | | 6 | | | | | | 36 | 2.8 |
| Jefferson | WR | 14 | 14 | | 4 | | | | | | 4 | | | | | | 24 | 1.7 |
| Taylor | WR | 6 | 6 | | 4 | | | | | | 4 | | | | | | 24 | 4.0 |
| Harraway | RB | 14 | 14 | 2 | | | | | | | 2 | | | | | | 12 | 0.9 |
| Kilmer | QB | 14 | 13 | 2 | | | | | | | 2 | | | | | | 12 | 0.9 |
| McNeil | WR | 8 | 1 | | 2 | | | | | | 2 | | | | | | 12 | 1.5 |
| Bass | RCB | 14 | 14 | | | | | | 1 | | 1 | | | | | | 6 | 0.4 |
| Duncan | DB | 14 | 14 | | | | | | 1 | | 1 | | | | | | 6 | 0.4 |
| Fischer | LCB | 14 | 14 | | | | | | 1 | | 1 | | | | | | 6 | 0.4 |
| Hanburger | RLB | 14 | 14 | | | | | 1 | | | 1 | | | | | | 6 | 0.4 |
| McDole | LDE | 14 | 14 | | | | | | 1 | | 1 | | | | | | 6 | 0.4 |
| Pardee | LLB | 14 | 14 | | | | | | 1 | | 1 | | | | | | 6 | 0.4 |
| Smith | TE | 8 | 7 | | 1 | | | | | | 1 | | | | | | 6 | 0.8 |
| Team Total | | 14 | | 8 | 13 | | | 1 | 5 | | 27 | 27 | 27 | 29 | 49 | | 276 | |
| Opp Total | | 14 | | 7 | 11 | | | 1 | 1 | | 20 | 19 | 20 | 17 | 33 | | 190 | |

Team

Team
| | | | Total Yds & TO | | | | | Passing | | | | | | | Rushing | | | | | Penalties | | |
| Player | PF | Yds | Ply | Y/P | TO | FL | 1stD | Cmp | Att | Yds | TD | Int | NY/A | 1stD | Att | Yds | TD | Y/A | 1stD | Pen | Yds | 1stPy |
|---|---|---|---|---|---|---|---|---|---|---|---|---|---|---|---|---|---|---|---|---|---|---|
| Team Stats | 276 | 4030 | 828 | 4.9 | 35 | 20 | 212 | 182 | 334 | 2273 | 13 | 15 | 6.5 | 112 | 477 | 1757 | 8 | 3.7 | 77 | 80 | 801 | 23 |
| Opp Stats | 190 | 3523 | 855 | 4.1 | 41 | 12 | 213 | 191 | 411 | 2127 | 11 | 29 | 4.8 | 119 | 408 | 1396 | 7 | 3.4 | 73 | 93 | 720 | 21 |
| Lg Rank Offense | 12 | 13 | | | 11 | 22 | 17 | | 19 | 10 | 17 | 8 | 5 | | 12 | 14 | 21 | 20 | | | | |
| Lg Rank Defense | 4 | 4 | | | 6 | 20 | 17 | | 24 | 12 | 5 | 1 | 4 | | 5 | 4 | 3 | 4 | | | | |

Quarter-by-quarter

Quarter-by-quarter
| Team | 1 | 2 | 3 | 4 | T |
|---|---|---|---|---|---|
| Redskins | 77 | 103 | 36 | 60 | 276 |
| Opponent | 26 | 42 | 39 | 83 | 190 |

== Postseason ==
| Round | Date | Opponent | Time | TV | Result | Record | Venue | Attendance | Recap |
|---|---|---|---|---|---|---|---|---|---|
| Divisional | December 26 | at San Francisco 49ers | 4:00 p.m. EST | CBS | L 20–24 | 0–1 | Candlestick Park | 45,327 | Recap |

=== Richard Nixon play ===
There was a rumor that President Richard Nixon called a key play that caused the Redskins to lose to the 49ers in the divisional round of the playoffs. Nixon, a friend of George Allen, once attended a practice game where he tried the same play to much better results.

== Playoff Game summaries ==
=== NFC Divisional Playoffs (Sunday, December 26, 1971): at San Francisco 49ers ===
NFC Divisional Playoffs: Washington Redskins 20 at San Francisco 49ers 24 – Game summary

| Quarter | 1 | 2 | 3 | 4 | Total |
|---|---|---|---|---|---|
| Redskins (9–5–1) | 7 | 3 | 3 | 7 | 20 |
| 49ers (10–5) | 0 | 3 | 14 | 7 | 24 |

at Candlestick Park • San Francisco, California

- Date: December 26, 1971
- Game time: 4:00 p.m. EST
- Game weather: 44 °F (7 °C); relative humidity 82%; wind 14 miles per hour (23 km/h; 12 kn) (Overcast)
- Game attendance: 45,327
- Referee: Pat Haggerty
- TV announcers (CBS): Ray Scott (play-by-play), Pat Summerall (color commentator) and Bruce Roberts (studio reporter)

| Team | Category | Player | Statistics |
|---|---|---|---|
| WAS | Passing | Billy Kilmer | 11/27, 106 YDS, 2 TDs, 1 INT |
| WAS | Rushing | Larry Brown | 27 CAR, 84 YDS |
| WAS | Receiving | Larry Brown | 6 REC, 62 YDS, 1 TD |
| SF | Passing | John Brodie | 10/19, 176 YDS, 2 TDs |
| SF | Rushing | Vic Washington | 16 CAR, 59 YDS |
| SF | Receiving | Ted Kwalick | 3 REC, 26 YDS |

Scoring summary

| Quarter | Time | Drive | | | Team | Scoring information | Score | |
| Quarter | Time | Plays | Yards | TOP | Team | Scoring information | WAS | SF |
|---|---|---|---|---|---|---|---|---|
| 1 | | | | | Redskins | Smith 5-yard touchdown reception from Kilmer, Knight kick good | 7 | 0 |
| 2 | | | | | 49ers | 23-yard field goal by Gossett | 7 | 3 |
| 2 | | | | | Redskins | 40-yard field goal by Knight | 10 | 3 |
| 3 | | | | | 49ers | Washington 78-yard touchdown reception from Brodie, Gossett kick good | 10 | 10 |
| 3 | | | | | 49ers | Windsor 2-yard touchdown reception from Brodie, Gossett kick good | 10 | 17 |
| 3 | | | | | Redskins | 35-yard field goal by Knight | 13 | 17 |
| 4 | | — | — | — | 49ers | Fumble recovery returned 0 yards for touchdown by Hoskins, Gossett kick good | 13 | 24 |
| 4 | | | | | Redskins | Brown 16-yard touchdown reception from Kilmer, Knight kick good | 20 | 24 |
| "TOP" = time of possession. For other American football terms, see Glossary of American football. | | | | | | | 20 | 24 |

- Point spread: Redskins +5½
- Time of game:

| Redskins | Game Statistics | 49ers |
|---|---|---|
| 13 | First downs | 11 |
| 39–99 | Rushes–yards | 39–112 |
| 106 | Passing yards | 176 |
| 11–27–1 | Passes | 10–19–0 |
| 1–13 | Sacked–yards | 1–3 |
| 93 | Net passing yards | 163 |
| 192 | Total yards | 285 |
| 247 | Return yards | 109 |
| 5–46.2 | Punts | 10–33.7 |
| 3–2 | Fumbles–lost | 0–0 |
| 4–55 | Penalties–yards | 3–41 |
