= Jim Snowden =

American football player (born 1942)

No. 74
- Positions: Offensive tackle, Defensive end

Personal information
- Born: January 12, 1942; Youngstown, Ohio, U.S.
- Died: October 3, 2020 (aged 78); Gainesville, Virginia, U.S.
- Listed height: 6 ft 3 in (1.91 m)
- Listed weight: 255 lb (116 kg)

Career information
- High school: East (Youngstown)
- College: Notre Dame (1960-1964)
- NFL draft: 1964: 5th round, 59th overall pick
- AFL draft: 1964: 15th round, 114th overall pick

Career history
- Washington Redskins (1965–1972); Houston Oilers (1973)*
- * Offseason or practice squad member only

Career NFL statistics
- Games played: 98
- Games started: 97
- Fumble recoveries: 3
- Stats at Pro Football Reference

James John Snowden Jr. (January 12, 1942–October 3, 2020) was an American professional football offensive tackle in the National Football League (NFL) for the Washington Redskins. He played college football at the University of Notre Dame and was selected in the fifth round of the 1964 NFL draft. Snowden was also selected in the fifteenth round of the 1964 AFL draft by the Kansas City Chiefs. He died from complications due to knee surgery.

== Early life ==
Snowden was born on January 12, 1942, in Youngstown, Ohio, to James John Sr. and Estele (Gandy) Snowden. He attended Youngstown's East High School (Youngstown East). As a senior in December 1959, he was named by the Associated Press (AP) as a first-team All-Ohio high school football player at offensive end for Youngstown East. He was selected to play in the Annual Scholastic Classic, a high school all-star football game held in Canton, Ohio, with teams selected by the Ohio Coaches Association.

He also played on Youngstown East's basketball team, and as a senior in March 1960 the AP named him to the second-team All-Ohio high school basketball team. Snowden was also a district champion in the shot put while on the track team at Youngstown East.

== College ==
Snowden was pursued by the University of Michigan and Ohio State University, but chose to attend the University of Notre Dame. He starred on the freshman team in 1960, and in 1961 joined the varsity as a sophomore fullback, standing a reported 6 ft 4 in (1.93 m) 240 lb. (108.9 kg). He was only the fourth black player on the team in school history. In 1961, Snowden had 32 rushing attempts for 169 yards and a touchdown, along with two pass receptions for 14 yards. Snowden had an injured knee during the 1961 season, with head coach Joe Kuharich stating Snowden was playing on courageously, at only about 60% of his ability. Doctors had advised that Snowden could do no further harm to his knee by playing. Snowden had knee surgery in late December, after the 1961 season was over.

In 1962, Snowden was not able to play because of low grades and was out of school altogether for the 1962-63 academic year. Snowden returned in September 1963 as a junior, having regained his academic eligibility. Before the season started, he was shifted back to offensive end from fullback by new varsity head coach Hugh Devore, who had coached Snowden at end on the freshman team. In mid-October, Devore inserted Snowden at right offensive tackle for one game due to the starter John Meyer's injury. Snowden would be listed as Meyer's backup after that.

Although he was selected in the 1964 draft as a future by the Washington Redskins, Snowden returned to Notre Dame for his senior year, now under coach Ara Parseghian, who would be named college coach of the year for 1964. Parseghian moved Snowden to left offensive tackle. Snowden was selected as a college all-star to play in the December 25, 1964, Mahi Shrine North-South All-Star game, at tackle.

== Professional career ==
Drafted as a "future" in the 5th round of 1964 NFL draft (59th overall), held in December 1963, Snowden signed with the Washington Redskins one year later, in early December 1964. The Kansas City Chiefs had selected Snowden in the 15th round of the 1964 AFL draft, 114th overall. Snowden went on to play seven years for Washington, starting either at right or left tackle every one of those seasons (1965-71); until his career was ended by a knee injury.

Pro Football Hall of Fame defensive tackle Ernie Stautner was a coach with Washington in 1965, variously described as an assistant coach, defensive line coach and/or offensive line coach. He worked with the rookie Snowden at offensive tackle. Snowden had limited experience as an offensive tackle at Notre Dame, and was somewhat confused playing the position. He did not at first appreciate all of the hard work Stautner demanded of him. But then Snowden came to Stautner and said, "'I want to be a good offensive tackle and I am willing to work hard now. Please teach me'". Stautner believed that Snowden became a good offensive tackle, through Snowden's own hard word.

Snowden started all 14 games as a rookie left tackle in 1965, but had a difficult season protecting future Hall of Fame quarterback Sonny Jurgensen; though he believed he improved and learned over the course of the season as he gained more experience. When new coach Otto Graham took over in 1966, he tried playing Snowden at tight end during training camp. By early September, however, offensive line coach Mike McCormick made former Dallas Cowboy Mitch Johnson the starting left tackle and Snowden the starting right tackle to give the offensive line more speed. Snowden replaced Washington's long-time right tackle Fran O'Brien, who was waived. In 1966, Johnson started all 14 games at left tackle, and Snowden started all 14 games at right tackle alongside Vince Promuto at right guard, along with Pro Bowler Len Hauss at center.

Snowden started all 14 games again in 1967 at right tackle alongside Promuto and Hauss, with the addition of left guard Ray Schoenke alongside Johnson. In 1968, Washington traded for San Francisco 49ers offensive tackle Walter Rock just before the season started. Graham started Rock at left tackle and moved Snowden to right tackle where he started all 14 games.

In 1969, Washington replaced Graham with coaching legend Vince Lombardi. Lombardi moved Snowden back to left tackle, where he again started all 14 games, and moved Rock to right tackle. Washington's record improved to 7–5–2 in 1969; their first winning season since 1955. Lombardi fell ill with cancer and died less than one year later, and Bill Austin took over as head coach in 1970. Once again Snowden started all 14 games at left tackle, with Rock starting at right tackle, but the team record fell to 6–8.

In 1971, future Hall of Fame coach George Allen took over as Washington's head coach. Snowden again started all 14 games at left tackle and Rock remained the starter at right tackle. The team finished 9–4–1 in 1971 and made the playoffs; losing in the divisional round to the San Francisco 49ers, 24–20. The offensive line of Snowden, Rock, Hauss and guards Ray Schoenke and John Wilbur permitted only 17 quarterback sacks that season, second best in the NFL.

Snowden suffered a torn knee ligament during Washington's training camp in 1972, which would effectively end his career. He was on injured reserved in 1972 and did not play. He did attend Super Bowl VII with the team, and was fined for breaking curfew on the Tuesday before the game (though others did so as well and were not punished).

In addition to fining Snowden, Allen wanted to send him home before the Super Bowl. The black players on the team went to team co-captain Charley Taylor (a future Hall of Fame receiver) and told him that if Snowden was sent home they would refuse to play in the Super Bowl. Taylor and co-captain Len Hauss convinced Allen to let Snowden stay with the team for the Super Bowl. Washington lost the game 14–7 to the undefeated Miami Dolphins, and while Taylor did not think the incident with Snowden caused them to lose, he stated that "'it sure didn't help'".

In May 1973, Washington traded Snowden, Mack Alston, Mike Farmed, Jeff Severson and Clifton McNeil to the Houston Oilers for future Pro Football Hall of Fame safety Ken Houston. The Oilers cut Snowden in September 1973 before the season started.

== Personal life and death ==
During training camp with Washington in August 1965, Snowden was called home due to the death of his two month old son, James III. The baby had been ill since he was born. Snowden died on October 3, 2020 at his home in Gainesville, Virginia, survived by his wife Joelle Mahe Snowden.
