= Walt Rock =

American football player (1941–2026)

No. 67, 76
- Positions: Offensive tackle, Defensive tackle

Personal information
- Born: November 4, 1941; Cleveland, Ohio, U.S.
- Died: May 19, 2026 (aged 84); Williamsburg, Virginia, U.S.
- Listed height: 6 ft 5 in (1.96 m)
- Listed weight: 255 lb (116 kg)

Career information
- High school: Elyria (Elyria, Ohio)
- College: Maryland (1959–1962)
- NFL draft: 1963: 2nd round, 21st overall pick
- AFL draft: 1963: 2nd round, 16th overall pick

Career history
- San Francisco 49ers (1963–1967); Washington Redskins (1968–1973); Florida Blazers (1974)

Awards and highlights
- Pro Bowl (1965); First-team All-ACC (1962)

Career NFL statistics
- Games played: 137
- Games started: 126
- Fumble recoveries: 5
- Stats at Pro Football Reference

Walter Warfield Rock (November 4, 1941 – May 19, 2026) was an American professional football player who was an offensive lineman in the National Football League (NFL). He played in Super Bowl VII for the Washington Redskins and was a member of the "Over-the-Hill Gang". Rock was also a member on the NFL's All Star Team. Several injuries to his right ankle ended his twelve-year career with the NFL. Rock played college football for the Maryland Terrapins and was selected in the second round of the 1963 NFL draft. He was also selected in the second round of the 1963 AFL draft by the Kansas City Chiefs.

During Rock's time with Washington, his win–loss record was 48–33, and during which he made it to Super Bowl VII. Before losing 14–7 to the Miami Dolphins in the Super Bowl, the 1972 Redskins won the divisional playoffs versus the Green Bay Packers 16–3, and were conference champions by defeating the Dallas Cowboys 26–3. As a member of the “Over-the-Hill Gang,” Walter prospered on the Redskins in their “all-star” years. Even before his all-star team developed under coach George Allen, he was picked in only his second year in the NFL for the 1965 Pro-Bowl. Playing for the Eastern Conference, they lost to the Western Conference 34–14.

== Early life ==
Rock was born in Cleveland, Ohio, on November 4, 1941. He grew up a Cleveland Browns fan, attending Browns’ games with his grandfather who encouraged him to become a football player. He attended Elyria High School, in Elyria, Ohio, and was a two-way player on the football team. Rock played offensive left end on its football team. In an October 24, 1958 game, Rock had touchdown receptions of 40 and 70 yards in the game's first quarter. He was also Elyria's left end on defense. As a senior in 1958, the 6 ft 4 in (1.93 m) or 6 ft 4.5 in (1.943 m) 205 lb (93 kg) Rock was first team All-Buckeye Conference on both offense and defense as an end.

As a senior, he went from 6 ft 2 in (1.88 m) 195 lb (88 kg) at the first of the year, to 6 ft 4.5 in (1.943 m) and 218 lb (99 kg) by the end of the year. Basketball was Rock's first love among sports, and he played on Elyria's basketball team. In 1959, he was voted among that season's outstanding players by Cleveland area basketball coaches. In 1972, he was inducted into the inaugural class of the Elyria Sports Hall of Fame.

== College ==
Rock was recruited by a number of Big Ten teams, but chose to attend the University of Maryland after being convinced by Maryland assistant coach Bernie Reid, a fellow Ohioan. He played on the football team under head coach Tommy Nugent. As a sophomore in 1960, he was now a 6 ft 5 in (1.96 m) 230 lb. (104.3) end on offense, including a role as a pass receiver. As a junior, he became the starter at guard when regular guard Tom Sankovich was hospitalized with a kidney injury, while also playing tackle on defense. He played both guard and tackle as a senior. Rock was honorable mention All-Atlantic Coast Conference (ACC) at guard as a junior in 1961. As a senior in 1962, he was named first-team All-ACC at guard.

He was selected to play at tackle in the 1962 Blue-Gray Game. He was also selected to play at guard in the 1963 Chicago College All-Star Game against the Green Bay Packers; however, he suffered an injury before that game.

== Professional football ==
=== San Francisco 49ers ===
The San Francisco 49ers selected Rock in the second round of the 1963 NFL draft, 21st overall. He was also selected in the second round of the American Football League (AFL) draft by the Kansas City Chiefs, 16th overall. He immediately signed with San Francisco after the selection was announced. He signed for a $13,000 salary and $6,000 bonus.

As a rookie in 1963, Rock was assigned to play defensive end as a reserve, and to play on special teams. During a punt return in a game against the Minnesota Vikings in September 1963, Rock was hit with a "teeth-rattling" block from the aptly named Steve Stonebreaker to free returner Bill Butler for a touchdown. Rock played in only seven games on the season, however, due to a knee injury that required surgery and ended his season.

In 1964, Rock became the 49ers' starting right offensive tackle when future Pro Football Hall of Famer Bob St. Clair was injured in training camp, ending his NFL career. Rock started all 14 games in 1964 at right tackle. He did so again in 1965 and was selected to the 1965 Pro Bowl.

Rock signed a two-year contract in 1966, subject to the NFL's option clause. He started all 14 games at right tackle for the 49ers in both 1966 and 1967. In 1967, the 49ers flew him home to Arlington, Virginia two days a week to work in his family’s garage door installation business in nearby Washington, D.C. He did not report to the 49ers training camp in 1968, seeking to be traded to the Baltimore Colts or Washington Redskins where he could be closer to his family's business. Under then current NFL practices, players who sought to play for another team after playing out their contracts, subject to an option clause, were still limited by Commissioner Pete Rozelle's ability to require that the new team compensate the original team with players or draft picks of equal value. In Rock's case, Rozelle determined he was worth a No. 1 draft pick. Rock was eventually traded to Washington in September 1968 for a 1970 first round draft pick.

=== Washington Redskins ===
Rock started 10 games at left tackle for Washington in 1968, with Jim Snowden at starting right tackle, under head coach Otto Graham. Graham already was in the Hall of Fame as a quarterback by that time, and was later selected as one of the NFL's 100 greatest players. After a 5–9 season, Graham was replaced by coaching legend Vince Lombardi, who would enter the Hall of Fame as a coach, and be selected as one of the greatest coaches in NFL history. Of Lombardi, Rock later said "[He] was the type of person who, if you're lucky, you're able to be associated with once in your life...[he] brought something to Washington last year which has carried over: Be a believer!... He always told us, 'Believe in yourselves and stick together...then you can't lose.'" Lombardi made Rock the starting right tackle and Snowden the starting left tackle. Rock played in only 12 games, starting all of them at right tackle. Washington's record improved to 7–5–2 in 1969.

Lombardi died less than one year later, and Rock started 13 games at right tackle under head coach Bill Austin in 1970, with the team falling to 6–8. In 1971, future Hall of Fame coach George Allen took over as Washington's head coach. Rock started all 14 games at right tackle under Allen in both 1971 and 1972. The team finished 9–4–1 in 1971. In 1971, the line of Rock, Snowden, guards Ray Schoenke and John Wilbur and center Len Hauss permitted only 17 quarterback sacks, second best in the NFL.

Washington finished 11–3 in 1972, first in the NFC's East Division. The offensive line, with Terry Hermeling and Paul Laaveg replacing Snowden and Schoenke, was again second best in the NFL in giving up only 11 sacks. Washington defeated the Dallas Cowboys in the 1972 National Football Conference championship game, 26–3, but lost to the undefeated Miami Dolphins in Super Bowl VII, 14–7.

Allen’s teams in Washington were known as “The Over The Hill Gang” because of his penchant to trade draft picks for veteran players. However, the 1972 team’s average age of 28.8 years was only 1.2 years over the league average; and the majority of his starting players, like the recently turned 31-year old Rock, were already on the team when he arrived in 1971.

In 1973, Rock suffered injuries and only played in seven games. Washington coach George Allen waived Rock before the 1974 season.

== Personal life and death ==
After retiring from football, Rock continued with the garage door installation business full time. In 2010, he retired to Williamsburg, Virginia. He died there on May 19, 2026, at the age of 84.
