= The Over-the-Hill Gang (American football) =

Nickname for the 1970s Washington Redskins

The Over-the-Hill Gang was a nickname given to the Washington Redskins of the National Football League (NFL) in the 1970s under head coach George Allen, so named due to the large number of veteran players on the team. Many of those players also played for Allen when he previously coached the Los Angeles Rams in the late 1960s.

The Over-the-Hill Gang's origins began upon Allen being hired in 1971. Of the Redskins first five picks in the 1971 NFL draft, they only used one and traded the rest as Allen decided to build his team with established players. One of these trades was for quarterback Billy Kilmer, who was made expendable after the New Orleans Saints selected Archie Manning. Kilmer led the Redskins to an appearance in Super Bowl VII the following year.

Allen later dealt seven draft choices (including the first- and third-round picks in 1971) as well as linebacker Marlin McKeever to his former team, the Rams. In exchange, the Redskins received linebackers Jack Pardee, Myron Pottios and Maxie Baughan, defensive tackle Diron Talbert, guard John Wilbur and special teams player Jeff Jordan. These players soon became a large part of the Over-the-Hill Gang defense. The Redskins also picked up Boyd Dowler, an eleven-year veteran with the Green Bay Packers, who won five championships as a Packer, and traded with the New York Jets for defensive end Verlon Biggs. He would later pick up strong safety Richie Petitbon (again from the Rams; Petitbon also played with the Chicago Bears when Allen was defensive coordinator under George Halas), defensive tackle Ron McDole from the Buffalo Bills and free safety Rosey Taylor (who also played for the Bears during Allen's tenure as defensive coordinator) from the San Francisco 49ers.

The average age of starters was 31 years old. Allen's strategy turned the Redskins around as the team improved to a 9-4-1 record in 1971, and they finished the 1972 season with an NFC-best 11-3 record. The retooled Redskins' nine victories in 1971 was the most by a Washington team in 29 years. In his seven seasons with the club, Allen and his veterans produced seven winning records, five playoff appearances, and one trip to the Super Bowl. Of the group, Sonny Jurgensen, Dave Robinson, Ken Houston, Deacon Jones, John Riggins, Chris Hanburger, and Charley Taylor were later inducted into the Pro Football Hall of Fame.

== See also ==
- List of NFL nicknames
