= Vactor =

Vactor may refer to:

== People ==
- David Van Vactor (1906–1994), American classical composer
- Ted Vactor (born 1944), American football player

== Vehicles ==
- Vacuum truck, sometimes referred to as vactors or vactor trucks

== See also ==
- Victor (name)
