= Leroy Sledge =

American football player (born 1946)

No. 22, 27, 24, 41
- Positions: Running back, split end

Personal information
- Born: October 11, 1946 (age 80); Richmond, Virginia, U.S.
- Listed height: 6 ft 2 in (1.88 m)
- Listed weight: 230 lb (104 kg)

Career information
- High school: Maggie L. Walker (Richmond)
- College: Bakersfield (1966)

Career history
- BC Lions (1967–1969); Ottawa Rough Riders (1969)*; Edmonton Eskimos (1970); Houston Oilers (1971); St. Louis Cardinals (1973)
- * Offseason or practice squad member only
- Stats at Pro Football Reference

Leroy James Sledge Jr. (born October 11, 1946) is an American former professional football running back who played in the National Football League (NFL) and Canadian Football League (CFL). He played one year of junior college football at Bakersfield College, where he earned honorable mention All-American honors. He turned pro in 1967, signing with the CFL's BC Lions. He was not yet eligible for the NFL or AFL draft. Sledge was voted the Lions' most popular player in 1967. He played for the Lions from 1967 to 1969 and for the Edmonton Eskimos in 1970. He was briefly the Houston Oilers' starting running back in 1971. Sledge ended his pro football career on the St. Louis Cardinals' injured reserve list in 1973. He had weight problems during his career.

== Early life ==
Leroy James Sledge Jr. was born on October 11, 1946, in Richmond, Virginia. He played high school football at Maggie L. Walker High School in Richmond, earning all-state honors at halfback in 1965 while helping them win the state title. He played safety on defense and was the team's punter as well. Sledge also participated in track and basketball in high school.

== College career ==
In April 1966, Sledge accepted a full athletic scholarship to play junior college football at Bakersfield College. He was also recruited by the University of Maryland, among other schools. He scored 72 points during the 1966 season, garnering J. C. Gridwire honorable mention All-American recognition.

== Professional career ==
=== BC Lions ===
In July 1967, it was reported that the 20-year-old Sledge had signed with the BC Lions of the Canadian Football League (CFL). He was not eligible for the NFL or AFL draft until his college class graduated in 1970. He played in all 16 games for the Lions during the 1967 season, recording 58 carries for 288 yards and two touchdowns, 41 receptions for 911 yards and four touchdowns, and nine kickoff returns for 226 yards. His 22.2 yards-per-reception were the most on the team that year. Sledge was voted the team's most popular player by fans. Following the season, he signed a two-year contract with the Lions.

Before training camp in 1968, Sledge had a large boil on his butt drained. He was criticized by Lions head coach Jim Champion for weight problems during the 1968 season. Sledge checked into training camp at 250 pounds. On October 13, 1968, he was indicted in Richmond for failing to report for induction into the United States Army. He said he "knew nothing" about his indictment. On October 22, he reported to the army. However, Sledge failed his physical examination due to a cartilage condition in his knee and severe bunions on both feet. He finished the 1968 season with 12 games played, 65 rushes for 219 yards, 14 receptions for 69 yards, and 11 kickoff returns for 228 yards. Champion had Sledge enroll at Columbia College in Vancouver in order to help him avoid military service.

Sledge reported to camp in 1969 at an improved weight of 220 pounds. He was moved to split end. He dropped two touchdowns during a preseason game. Sledge was waived on July 28, 1969, before the start of the regular season. However, he was recalled by the Lions on August 18, 1969. Sledge played in six games for BC during the 1969 season, rushing for 179 yards and two touchdown, before being waived in late September due to an ankle injury.

=== Ottawa and Edmonton ===
In early November 1969, Sledge was signed to a trial by the Ottawa Rough Riders but soon released after showing up to practice at 242 pounds. On June 13, 1970, he signed with the Edmonton Eskimos. Sledge played in one game for Edmonton before being released in early August 1970.

=== Houston Oilers ===
Sledge signed with the Houston Oilers for the 1971 season. Oilers head coach Ed Hughes was impressed by Sledge during training camp, stating "He's so powerfully built that when he breaks into the open, it looks like the defensive backs are going to get hurt trying to tackle him". Sledge missed time during camp with a broken thumb and then a pulled rib cartilage. He relieved Joe Dawkins on October 10 against the Washington Redskins, and was the team's leading rusher with only 31 yards while also catching one touchdown. Sledge made his only career NFL start a week later in place of Dawkins on October 17 against the Detroit Lions, leading the team with only 36 rushing yards. Sledge played in six regular season games, starting one, overall for the Oilers in 1971, rushing 24 times for 74 yards while also catching six passes for 32 yards and one touchdown. He fumbled once. Sledge was released on July 19, 1972.

=== St. Louis Cardinals ===
On July 18, 1973, Sledge was signed by the St. Louis Cardinals. He had knee surgery on July 25 and was placed on injured reserve on September 12, 1973. He was released on August 29, 1974.

== Personal life ==
In February 1968, Sledge's cousin Ralph Williams, signed with the BC Lions. Williams played college football at Allen University. Sledge's nephew, Rodney Sledge, played for the Richmond Speed of the af2 in 2002.
