= Jon Jaqua =

American football player (born 1948)

No. 48
- Position: Safety

Personal information
- Born: September 10, 1948 (age 78); Eugene, Oregon, U.S.
- Listed height: 6 ft 0 in (1.83 m)
- Listed weight: 190 lb (86 kg)

Career information
- High school: Eugene
- College: Lewis & Clark
- NFL draft: 1970: undrafted

Career history
- Washington Redskins (1970–1972)
- Stats at Pro Football Reference

Jon V. Jaqua (born September 10, 1948) is an American former professional football player who was a safety for the Washington Redskins of the National Football League (NFL) from 1970 to 1972. He played college football for the Lewis & Clark Pioneers.

He is the father of soccer player Nate Jaqua, who played for Seattle Sounders FC and the United States men's national team.
