= Clifton McNeil =

American football player (1939–2025)

No. 85, 18, 86
- Position: Wide receiver

Personal information
- Born: May 25, 1939; Mobile, Alabama, U.S.
- Died: December 21, 2025 (aged 86)
- Listed height: 6 ft 2 in (1.88 m)
- Listed weight: 187 lb (85 kg)

Career information
- College: Grambling State (1961-1962)
- NFL draft: 1962: 11th round, 151st overall pick

Career history
- Cleveland Browns (1964–1967); San Francisco 49ers (1968–1969); New York Giants (1970–1971); Washington Redskins (1971-1972); Houston Oilers (1973)

Awards and highlights
- NFL champion (1964); First-team All-Pro (1968); Pro Bowl (1968)

Career NFL statistics
- Receptions: 181
- Receiving yards: 2,734
- Receiving touchdowns: 23
- Stats at Pro Football Reference

Clifton Anthony McNeil (May 25, 1939 – December 21, 2025) was an American professional football player who was a wide receiver in the National Football League (NFL) from 1964 through 1973. He played college football for the Grambling State Tigers and was selected by the Cleveland Browns in the eleventh round in the 1962 NFL draft. He played with the Browns for four seasons before being traded to the San Francisco 49ers in 1968 for a draft pick. McNeil acquired a number of nicknames on the field, including Sticks, Spider, Road Runner and Night Train, for his slim build and speed.

With the 49ers in 1968, he led the NFL in receptions with 71, accounting for 994 yards and seven touchdowns and was selected to the Pro Bowl. After a disappointing 1969 season he went to the New York Giants where he caught 50 passes for 764 yards and four touchdowns before finishing his career with the Washington Redskins and the Houston Oilers.

McNeil died on December 21, 2025, at the age of 86.

== NFL career statistics ==
Legend
	Won the Super Bowl
	Led the league
**Bold**	Career high

Year	Team	Games		Receiving				
Year	Team	GP	GS	Rec	Yds	Avg	Lng	TD
1964	CLE	14	0	4	69	17.3	28	1
1965	CLE	13	0	3	69	23.0	32	0
1966	CLE	14	0	2	94	**47.0**	50	2
1967	CLE	2	0	3	33	11.0	23	2
1968	SFO	14	14	**71**	**994**	14.0	65	**7**
1969	SFO	11	7	17	255	15.0	**80**	3
1970	NYG	14	14	50	764	15.3	59	4
1971	NYG	6	6	16	209	13.1	24	1
1971	WAS	8	1	14	244	17.4	36	2
1972	WAS	6	0	0	0	0.0	0	0
1973	HOU	3	0	1	3	3.0	3	0
Career		105	42	181	2,734	15.1	80	22
