= Ted Vactor =

American football player (born 1944)

No. 25, 29, 33
- Position: Cornerback

Personal information
- Born: May 27, 1944 (age 82); Washington, Pennsylvania, U.S.
- Listed height: 6 ft 0 in (1.83 m)
- Listed weight: 185 lb (84 kg)

Career information
- High school: Washington (Washington, Pennsylvania)
- College: Nebraska (1962-1965)
- NFL draft: 1966: undrafted

Career history

Playing
- Omaha Mustangs (1966-1967); Virginia Sailors (1968); Washington Redskins (1969–1974); Chicago Bears (1975)

Coaching
- District of Columbia (1977-1982) Head coach; Washington Federals (1983-1984) Special teams / backs coach

Awards and highlights
- Second-team All-Big Eight (1964)

Career NFL statistics
- Interceptions: 2
- Fumble recoveries: 4
- Kick/punt return yards: 1,035
- Touchdowns: 1
- Stats at Pro Football Reference

Head coaching record
- Career: 24–31–1 (.438)

Theodore Francis Vactor (born May 27, 1944) is an American former professional football player who was a cornerback in the National Football League (NFL) for the Washington Redskins and Chicago Bears. He played college football for the Nebraska Cornhuskers.

Vactor is often mistakenly credited with blocking the Miami Dolphins' Garo Yepremian's late field goal attempt in Super Bowl VII that led to the bizarre fumble-return touchdown by the Washington Redskins' Mike Bass. Several still photos of the play show him diving to block the kick, but the kick cleared him and was actually blocked by Redskins' defensive lineman Bill Brundige.

Vactor also served as the head football coach at the University of the District of Columbia from 1977 to 1982 where he compiled an overall record of 24–31–1. He resigned his position as the Firebirds' head coach in 1983 to become an assistant coach with the Washington Federals of the United States Football League.

In 1999, Vactor was inducted to the Washington-Greene County Chapter of the Pennsylvania Hall of Fame and in 2000 he was inducted into the Nebraska Hall of Fame.

== Head coaching record ==
Year	Team	Overall	Conference	Standing	Bowl/playoffs
District of Columbia Firebirds (NAIA/NCAA Division II Independent) (1977–1982)
1979	District of Columbia	7–3			
1980	District of Columbia	2–7–1			
1981	District of Columbia	3–7			
1982	District of Columbia	2–8			
District of Columbia:		24–31–1			
Total:		24–31–1			
