= Paul Laaveg =

American football player (born 1948)

No. 73
- Position: Guard

Personal information
- Born: October 1, 1948 (age 78); Sioux Falls, South Dakota, U.S.
- Listed height: 6 ft 4 in (1.93 m)
- Listed weight: 245 lb (111 kg)

Career information
- College: Iowa
- NFL draft: 1970: 4th round, 103rd overall pick

Career history
- Washington Redskins (1970–1975)

Career NFL statistics
- Games played: 72
- Games started: 53
- Stats at Pro Football Reference

Paul Martin Laaveg (born October 1, 1948) is an American former professional football player who was an offensive lineman in the National Football League (NFL) for the Washington Redskins. He played high school football at Belmond, Iowa, college football for the Iowa Hawkeyes and was selected in the fourth round of the 1970 NFL draft.
