= Jeff Severson =

American football player (born 1949)

No. 44, 37, 45, 46
- Position: Defensive back

Personal information
- Born: September 16, 1949 (age 77); Fargo, North Dakota, U.S.
- Listed height: 6 ft 1 in (1.85 m)
- Listed weight: 183 lb (83 kg)

Career information
- College: Long Beach State
- NFL draft: 1971: 12th round, 297th overall pick

Career history
- Washington Redskins (1972); Houston Oilers (1973–1974); Denver Broncos (1975); St. Louis Cardinals (1976–1977); Los Angeles Rams (1979)

Career NFL statistics
- Sacks: 1
- Fumble recoveries: 3
- Interceptions: 6
- Stats at Pro Football Reference

Jeffrey Kent Severson (born September 16, 1949) is an American former professional football player who was a safety in the National Football League (NFL) for the Washington Redskins, Houston Oilers, Denver Broncos, and the St. Louis Cardinals. He played college football for the Long Beach State 49ers and was selected in the 12th round of the 1971 NFL draft. Severson played in Super Bowl VII.

Jeff also coached with Pro Football Hall of Fame Coach George Allen at Long Beach State for the 1990 season.

Additionally, Severson was in the 1986 film The Best of Times, with Robin Williams and Kurt Russell. He played Johnny O, a football player for the opposing Bakersfield team.
