= Diron Talbert =

American football player (born 1944)

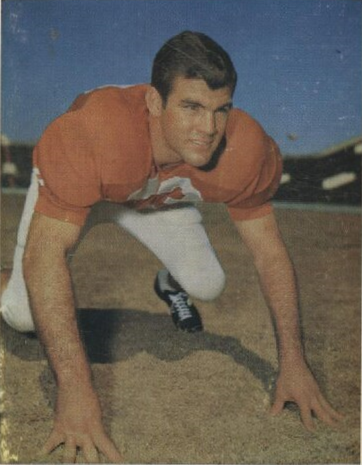
- Talbert with the Texas Longhorns in 1966

No. 72
- Positions: Defensive tackle, Defensive end

Personal information
- Born: July 1, 1944 (age 82); Pascagoula, Mississippi, U.S.
- Listed height: 6 ft 5 in (1.96 m)
- Listed weight: 255 lb (116 kg)

Career information
- High school: Texas City (Texas City, Texas)
- College: Texas
- NFL draft: 1966: 5th round, 66th overall pick
- AFL draft: 1966: Red Shirt 2nd round, 17th overall pick

Career history
- Los Angeles Rams (1967–1970); Washington Redskins (1971–1980)

Awards and highlights
- Pro Bowl (1974); 70 Greatest Redskins; National champion (1963); First-team All-SWC (1965); 1965 Orange Bowl champion; 1966 Bluebonnet Bowl champion; Longhorn Hall of Fame

Career NFL statistics
- Fumble recoveries: 10
- Sacks: 84.5
- Stats at Pro Football Reference

Diron Vester Talbert (born July 1, 1944) is an American former professional football player who played defensive end in the National Football League (NFL) for 14 seasons, making the pro-bowl in 1975. He played four seasons with the Los Angeles Rams and 10 with the Washington Redskins, with whom he went to Super Bowl VII. He was later named one of the 70 greatest Redskin players of all time. As a freshman at the University of Texas he was part of the team that won the 1963 National Championship and he later made all-conference and pre-season All-American teams.

== Early life ==
Talbert was born on July 1, 1944, in Pascagoula, Mississippi. He was one of six children born to John V. and Margaret L. Talbert. The family moved to Texas when he was a child. Talbert attended Texas City High School (TCHS) in Texas City, Texas, where he played lineman on the football team. He was a tri-captain of the football team his senior year. His older brothers Don (lineman) and Charlie (end), and younger brother Paul, also played football at TCHS.

== College career ==
Talbert played college football at the University of Texas where he was an All-Conference defensive end in his junior year, and a pre-season All-American in the next. As a freshman he played with the team that won the consensus National Championship. His older brother Charlie Talbert was on that team.

He played on the varsity 1964-66, and was a tri-captain in 1966. The Associated Press (AP) ranked Texas 5th in 1964. He was selected All-Southwest Conference in 1965. He played in the North-South game and the Hula Bowl. Talbert was inducted into the University of Texas Longhorn Hall of Honor in 2005.

Talbert's brothers Don, Charlie and Paul all attended the University of Texas, though Paul moved on to Colorado University. Don and Charlie are also in the Longhorn's Hall of Honor, and Don was an All-American at tackle in 1961. From 1957 until Talbert's graduation, Texas coach Darrell Royal had one of the Talbert brothers as a starter on his teams. He was a teammate and roommate of future College Hall of Fame Texas star Tommy Nobis.

== Professional career ==
=== Los Angeles Rams ===
Talbert was drafted by the San Diego Chargers in the 2nd round (17th overall) of the 1966 AFL Redshirt Draft and by the Los Angeles Rams in the 5th round (66th overall) of the 1966 NFL Draft. However, Talbert spent a fifth year at Texas, and did not join the Rams until 1967. He signed with the Rams playing with them from 1967 to 1970, under coach George Allen. Talbot played little in 1967 and sparingly in 1968, but in 1969 he started 13 of 14 games at right defensive end and had 7.5 quarterback sacks. He surpassed this in 1970, starting all 14 games at right defensive tackle, with 11.5 sacks.

In a massive trade, he was traded along with Jack Pardee, Maxie Baughan, Myron Pottios, John Wilbur, Jeff Jordan and a 1971 fifth-round pick (124th overall–traded to Green Bay Packers for Boyd Dowler) from the Rams to the Redskins for Marlin McKeever, first and third rounders in 1971 (10th and 63rd overall–Isiah Robertson and Dave Elmendorf respectively) and third, fourth, fifth, sixth and seventh rounders in 1972 (73rd, 99th, 125th, 151st and 177th overall–to New England Patriots, traded to Philadelphia Eagles for Joe Carollo, Bob Christiansen, Texas Southern defensive tackle Eddie Herbert and to New York Giants respectively) on January 28, 1971.

=== Washington Redskins ===
In 1971, he began playing defensive tackle for the Washington Redskins with whom he played until his retirement in 1980. Talbert rejoined coach George Allen, who became Washington’s head coach in 1971, leading the team as head coach through 1977.

He was one of the relatively younger members of Washington’s original over-the-hill-gang. From 1971 to 1977, he started 97 of 98 possible regular season games at right tackle, and had 10 or more sacks three times; with a career high 12.5 in 1976. He went to the Pro Bowl after the 1974 season, when he had 10 sacks. In 1973, he was named second-team All-Conference by United Press International (UPI). In his last three seasons, he started 12 (1978/3.5 sacks), 16 (1979/4.5 sacks), and then five games (1980/no sacks); retiring after the 1980 season.

Talbert was a key member of 1972 NFC Championship team and was the team's starting right tackle in Super Bowl VII. Personally, Talbert’s most memorable game was Washington’s victory over the Cowboys in the 1972 NFC championship game, on the way to the Super Bowl.

It was during his Washington years that Talbert played an iconic role as part of the long-standing 1970s rivalry between the Redskins and the Dallas Cowboys. He was known for his particularly strong distaste for the Cowboys and their quarterback Roger Staubach (though he later became a friend and business partner with Cowboy Walt Garrison). Talbert said “‘Losing to Dallas was the worst feeling in the world. You’d rather have your arm cut off.’”

His older brother Don Talbert also played in the NFL. Ironically, Don played the first two seasons of his eight-year NFL career in Dallas, and returned to Dallas for his final season in 1971, Diron's first year with Washington.

Talbert played 14 NFL seasons for a total of 186 games, starting 157, with 84.5 sacks and 10 fumble recoveries.

In 2002, he was named one of the 70 greatest Redskins. In 2012, he was named among the 80 greatest.

== After football ==
After retiring from football, Talbert entered the investment business and was involved with hotels, real estate and oil. He also owns and operates a retail grocery business along with his brother Don in Rosenberg, Texas.

== Personal life ==
In 2012, he was among a group of former players who brought lawsuits against the NFL in Houston courts for not disclosing the risk from head injuries. Other plaintiffs included his brother Don, and a number of his old Dallas Cowboy opponents, such as Lee Roy Jordan, Chuck Howley, Ralph Neely, Rayfield Wright, Charlie Waters and Walt Garrison.
