= Jeff Jordan (running back) =

American football player (born 1945)

No. 31, 30
- Position: Running back

Personal information
- Born: July 12, 1945 (age 81); St. Louis, Missouri, U.S.
- Listed height: 6 ft 1 in (1.85 m)
- Listed weight: 215 lb (98 kg)

Career information
- High school: Central Valley (Spokane Valley, Washington)
- College: Washington
- NFL draft: 1967: undrafted

Career history
- Los Angeles Rams (1967–1970); Washington Redskins (1971–1972)
- Stats at Pro Football Reference

Jeffrey Lincoln Jordan (born July 12, 1945) is an American former professional football player who was a running back in the National Football League (NFL) for the Los Angeles Rams and the Washington Redskins. He played college football for the Washington Huskies.

He graduated from Central Valley High School in Spokane, Washington, in 1963. After being a reserved running back on Central Valley's team as a junior, he burst onto the scene as a senior and became an all-state running back which earned him a football scholarship to the University of Washington. He played fullback for the Huskies from 1964 through 1966. At 6-1, 215, he had outstanding speed, running the 40 yard dash in 4.4. During his sophomore season of 1964, he beat out fullback Junior Coffey for the starting position. Coffey who went on to play for the Atlanta Falcons of the NFL had been an All-Pacific Coast Conference selection. As a senior in 1966, Jordan was instrumental in helping the Huskies beat the Ohio State Buckeyes 38-32 in Columbus Ohio, scoring on three short TD runs in the first half. A teammate of Jordan's on the Huskies 1966 team was TE Mac Bledsoe who is the father of former Washington State and NFL QB Drew Bledsoe.

In Jordan's three-year college career, in which he was hampered by injuries after a fine soph season, he rushed 220 times for 791 yards (3.6 ave) and 11 TDs.

Following college, he played 3 years in the NFL for legendary coach George Allen, in 1970, when he played in 9 games for the Los Angeles Rams, rushing for 50 yards on 10 carries and one game each in 1971 and 1972 with the Washington Redskins. He was traded along with Jack Pardee, Maxie Baughan, Myron Pottios, Diron Talbert, John Wilbur and a 1971 fifth-round pick (124th overall–traded to Green Bay Packers for Boyd Dowler) from the Rams to the Redskins for Marlin McKeever, first and third rounders in 1971 (10th and 63rd overall–Isiah Robertson and Dave Elmendorf respectively) and third, fourth, fifth, sixth and seventh rounders in 1972 (73rd, 99th, 125th, 151st and 177th overall–to New England Patriots, traded to Philadelphia Eagles for Joe Carollo, Bob Christiansen, Texas Southern defensive tackle Eddie Herbert and to New York Giants respectively) on January 28, 1971.
