= Ray Schoenke =

American football player (1941–2026)

No. 65, 62
- Positions: Tackle, Guard

Personal information
- Born: September 10, 1941; Wahiawā, Hawaii Territory, U.S.
- Died: March 8, 2026 (aged 84)
- Listed height: 6 ft 4 in (1.93 m)
- Listed weight: 250 lb (113 kg)

Career information
- High school: Punahou School (Honolulu, Hawaii); Weatherford (Weatherford, Texas)
- College: SMU
- NFL draft: 1963: 11th round, 146th overall pick
- AFL draft: 1963: 10th round, 73rd overall pick

Career history
- Dallas Cowboys (1963–1964); Green Bay Packers (1966)*; Cleveland Browns (1966)*; Washington Redskins (1966–1975)
- * Offseason or practice squad member only

Awards and highlights
- Second-team All-American (1962); 2× First-team All-SWC (1961, 1962)

Career NFL statistics
- Games played: 145
- Games started: 99
- Fumble recoveries: 5
- Stats at Pro Football Reference

Raymond Frederick Schoenke (September 10, 1941 – March 8, 2026) was an American professional football player who was an offensive lineman in the National Football League (NFL) for the Dallas Cowboys and Washington Redskins. He played college football for the SMU Mustangs.

== Early life ==
Born in Hawaii to Olivia Pualani Alapa, a full-blooded native Hawaiian and Raymond F. Schoenke, of German descent from Minnesota, who was stationed with the U.S. Army 3rd Engineering Corp, Schofield Barracks in Hawaii where he was an All-Star athlete on their baseball and basketball teams in the late 1920s and 1930s.

Schoenke's family moved to Texas when he was 10–13 years then returned to Hawaii, where he attended Punahou School in Honolulu for grades 9-11 where he received recognition in football with an All-Star Award (the equivalent of all-State since Hawaii at the time was still a Territory). For his senior year in high school his family returned to Texas where he was an All-State football player for Weatherford High School.

In 2015, he was inducted into the Polynesian Football Hall of Fame, which honors Polynesia'a greatest football players and contributors.

== College career ==
Schoenke accepted a football scholarship from Southern Methodist University. As a sophomore, he played defensive middle guard and was named Sophomore Lineman of the Year in the Southwest Conference. He also played at fullback, guard, tackle, center and linebacker, receiving All-Southwest conference honors in both his junior and senior years.

He received Academic All-American honors as a senior. The University honored Schoenke by awarding the SMU "M" award - recognizing him as one of the most Distinguished Seniors to graduate in the class of 1963. Later, Schoenke was also named to SMU's 75th Anniversary All Time Football Team and received the Silver Anniversary Mustang Award from the SMU Letterman's Association, which honors the character and achievements of former athletes.

== Professional career ==
Schoenke was selected by the Dallas Cowboys in the eleventh round (146th overall) of the 1963 NFL draft and by the Oakland Raiders in the tenth round (73rd overall) of the 1963 AFL draft. As a rookie he was tried at tackle, guard and center. In 1964, he started 10 games at right tackle, after passing Bob Fry on the depth chart. He was waived injured on August 8, 1965.

In 1966, after being out of football for a year recovering from his injury, he signed as a free agent with the Green Bay Packers. On July 29, he was traded to the Cleveland Browns in exchange for an undisclosed draft choice (not exercised). He was released by the Browns on September 6. He was signed by the Washington Redskins to their taxi squad and was promoted to the active roster on October 1.

Schoenke became a key player on the offensive line for the next 10 years. In 1967, he was named the starter at left guard. He played in Super Bowl VII, losing 7-14 to the Miami Dolphins. In 1974, he was named the starter at left tackle. On January 21, 1976, he announced his retirement to focus on his insurance company.

In 1987, he was selected for the "50th Anniversary Greatest Redskins Team.” In 2002, Schoenke was picked as one of the top 100 players in the history of the Redskins.

== Politics ==
Schoenke was a lifelong supporter of liberal causes. Spurred to activism following the 1968 assassinations of Martin Luther King Jr. and Robert F. Kennedy, Schoenke volunteered for Senator George McGovern during the 1972 United States presidential election and was named national chairman of Professional Athletes for McGovern. In this role, Schoenke successfully sought out other NFL players willing to campaign for McGovern. At one point, Schoenke was even reprimanded by Redskins head coach George Allen after he declined to take a team photograph with President Richard Nixon in July of 1971.

Schoenke later worked in the East Wing of the White House for President Jimmy Carter and raised money for the Bill Clinton 1992 presidential campaign, after which Clinton offered Schoenke an appointment as United States Ambassador to New Zealand. Schoenke declined, instead announcing his candidacy for Governor of Maryland in 1998. Schoenke withdrew from the Democratic contest before the primary election.

Schoenke later supported the presidential candidacies of Senators John Kerry in 2004 and Barack Obama in 2008. In 2021, he expressed opposition to Donald Trump and the January 6 Capitol attackers, stating "They should have been arrested. But when you have a president leading the charge, that makes it more difficult."

== Personal life and death ==
Schoenke and his wife of 53 years, Nancy, resided in rural Montgomery County. He was nicknamed "The Mummy" for the amount of sports tape he would use, eventually needing to go through five surgeries and two knee replacements.

Schoenke died from complications of cancer on March 8, 2026, at the age of 84.
