= John Wilbur (American football) =

American football player (1943–2013)

No. 65, 60
- Positions: Guard, tackle

Personal information
- Born: May 21, 1943; San Diego, California, U.S.
- Died: December 9, 2013 (aged 70); Honolulu, Hawaii, U.S.
- Listed height: 6 ft 3 in (1.91 m)
- Listed weight: 251 lb (114 kg)

Career information
- High school: Alexander Hamilton (CA)
- College: Stanford
- AFL draft: 1965: 6th round, 45th overall pick

Career history
- Dallas Cowboys (1966–1969); Los Angeles Rams (1970); Washington Redskins (1971–1974); The Hawaiians (1974–1975); Philadelphia Eagles (1976)*
- * Offseason or practice squad member only

Awards and highlights
- Second-team All-PCC (1965)

Career NFL statistics
- Games played: 101
- Fumble recoveries: 2
- Stats at Pro Football Reference

John Leonard Wilbur (May 21, 1943 – December 9, 2013) was an American professional football offensive lineman in the National Football League (NFL) for the Dallas Cowboys, Los Angeles Rams and Washington Redskins. He also was a member of The Hawaiians in the World Football League (WFL). He played college football at Stanford University.

== Early life ==
Wilbur attended Alexander Hamilton High School in Los Angeles, California. He declined football scholarships from the University of Southern California and the University of California-Los Angeles, opting for Stanford University in 1961 and intending to study law with an Eagle Scout scholarship.

He became a starter at guard as a sophomore. He was a three-year starter and played offensive guard, offensive tackle and defensive end. As a junior, he had 13 tackles at defensive end in a 27–14 win against the University of Notre Dame. He graduated with a degree in history.

== Professional career ==
=== Dallas Cowboys ===
Wilbur was selected by the Kansas City Chiefs in the sixth round (45th overall) of the 1965 AFL draft with a future draft pick, which allowed the team to draft him before his college eligibility was over. In 1966, he chose to sign with the NFL's Dallas Cowboys as a free agent in 1966. As a rookie, he quit training camp and had to be convinced to come back. He was tried at guard. defensive end and offensive tackle. He played mainly as the wedge-buster on special teams and as backup offensive tackle.

He was a part of the 1967 NFL Championship Game famously known as "The Ice Bowl". In 1968, he became the starter at right guard when Leon Donohue didn't recover from offseason surgery and was placed on the injured reserve list.

Blocking for quarterback Don Meredith and playing with Peter Gent, Wilbur was an anti-hero, outspoken against the "racists elements" on the team and in the city. Part of the "Wild Rebel Bunch" contingency (along with Gent and Meredith), he infamously organized a group of Cowboys to be security guards at the Texas International Pop Festival. He was also a Player Representative in the National Football League Players Association (NFLPA) for the Cowboys.

On June 5, 1970, he was initially traded to the St. Louis Cardinals in exchange for a third round draft choice (#69-Sam Scarber), but after threatening to retire, the Cardinals traded him to the Los Angeles Rams in exchange for guard Mike Lahood. He was replaced by Blaine Nye, who was moved from defensive tackle to offensive guard.

=== Los Angeles Rams ===
Wilbur was a backup right guard for the Rams and played mostly on special teams under the auspices of hall of fame coach George Allen.

He was traded along with Jack Pardee, Maxie Baughan, Myron Pottios, Diron Talbert, Jeff Jordan and a 1971 fifth-round pick (124th overall–traded to Green Bay Packers for Boyd Dowler) from the Rams to the Washington Redskins for Marlin McKeever, first and third rounders in 1971 (10th and 63rd overall–Isiah Robertson and Dave Elmendorf respectively) and third, fourth, fifth, sixth and seventh rounders in 1972 (73rd, 99th, 125th, 151st and 177th overall–to New England Patriots, traded to Philadelphia Eagles for Joe Carollo, Bob Christiansen, Texas Southern defensive tackle Eddie Herbert and to New York Giants respectively) on January 28, 1971.

=== Washington Redskins ===
Wilbur reunited with Allen and became a starter at right guard with the Washington Redskins from 1971 to 1973. He helped the team reach Super Bowl VII against the Miami Dolphins. He is credited with being one of the first players to sew the sleeves of his jerseys tight, later adopted by the League.

In 1972, Nixon was on his way up and the Vietnam War was raging. Wilbur was one of the Redskins players to support George McGovern and his anti-war platform. He became good friends with both McGovern and a young reporter, Hunter S. Thompson, who would later write Fear and Loathing on the Campaign Trail '72. He is referenced in Thompson’s book, The Curse of Lono. He also was named the treasurer for the NFLPA.

=== The Hawaiians (WFL) ===
In 1974, just before the NFLPA lockout concerning binding arbitration for salary disputes, Wilbur left the NFL to play for the Hawaiians of the World Football League. The next year, he was a player/coach on the offensive line.

=== Philadelphia Eagles ===
On May 17, 1976, he signed as a free agent with the Philadelphia Eagles. He retired before the start of the season on September 6.

== Personal life ==
Wilbur earned a master's degree in business administration from the University of California, Los Angeles while playing for the Dallas Cowboys.

Through his time at Stanford, Wilbur developed a keen appreciation for rugby football. As his years in the NFL wound down Wilbur played with the Hawaii Harlequins Rugby Football Club, and continued to enjoy the social aspects of the game long after hanging up his boots. Wilbur was a regular at the Aspen Ruggerfest.

Wilbur died on December 9, 2013. Postmortem research showed Wilbur had chronic traumatic encephalopathy. He is one of at least 345 NFL players to be diagnosed after death with this disease, which is caused by repeated hits to the head.

Wilbur had three children: Nathan, Dione, and Lindsey, and four grandchildren.
