= Bill Roth (sportscaster) =

American sportscaster

- Born: Pittsburgh, Pennsylvania, US
- Education: Syracuse University
- Sports commentary career
- Teams: Virginia Tech Hokies; Richmond Braves; UCLA Bruins
- Sports: NCAA Football; NCAA Basketball

William B. Roth is an American television and radio sportscaster. Longtime play-by-play voice of Virginia Tech Hokies football and men's basketball from 1988 to 2015 and again starting in 2022 for Hokies Football, Roth also served as an announcer for the Richmond Braves from 1993–96, and spent 2015-16 with the UCLA Bruins before joining ESPN in 2016.

== Education ==
Roth was born in Pittsburgh and grew up in Mt. Lebanon, Pennsylvania, a suburb of Pittsburgh. While in high school, he interned for radio station KDKA and later at the Duquesne University campus station. Roth graduated from Syracuse University's S. I. Newhouse School of Public Communications in 1987. It was at Syracuse where Roth began his broadcasting career at campus station WAER where he was a radio sportscaster for the Syracuse Orange sports. He won the Bob Costas Scholarship at Syracuse in 1986. After graduating from Syracuse, he began broadcasting various sports for ESPN including field hockey, lacrosse, professional kick boxing, baseball, and other NCAA sports.

== Career ==
Following graduation, Roth began working at Marshall University and was featured on SportsCenter at 21 years old. Seven months into the job, Roth followed his boss David Braine who left Marshall to be the athletic director for the Virginia Tech Hokies.

=== Virginia Tech ===
At the age of 22, Roth began working for Virginia Tech as the "Voice of the Hokies" in 1988, where he broadcast Hokies football, basketball and baseball games. Roth also served as host of the Hokie Hotline, a weekly radio show featuring Virginia Tech coach Frank Beamer and basketball coaches Frankie Allen, Bill Foster, Bobby Hussey, Ricky Stokes, Seth Greenberg, James Johnson and Buzz Williams. Roth also hosted a weekly television show, Virginia Tech Sports Today, that was shown every Sunday morning on TV stations in Virginia, North Carolina, Tennessee, West Virginia, and Maryland. Roth's tenure is longer than any other sportscaster in Virginia Tech history and he called more games than any other announcer in the school's history. Roth has called several NCAA men's basketball tournaments, and major bowl games: Orange Bowl (1996, 2008, 2009, 2011), Sugar Bowl (1995, 2000, 2004, 2012), Gator Bowl (1994, 1997, 2000, 2001, 2005.) Roth called games of Virginia Tech great Michael Vick including the school's 1999 undefeated regular season during Vick's time at the school. Roth's signature broadcast opening, marking the transition from pregame to game program, greeted viewers with the phrase "From the Blue Waters of the Chesapeake Bay to the Hills of Tennessee, the Virginia Tech Hokies are on the air."

On April 8, 2022, it was announced Roth would return as the Voice of Hokies Football, following the departure of his successor Jon Laaser.

=== Richmond Braves ===
From 1993-1996, Roth served as a play-by-play announcer with the Richmond Braves baseball team, the triple-A affiliate of the Atlanta Braves.

=== UCLA ===
In April 2015, Roth was announced as the new play-by-play announcer for the UCLA Bruins, replacing Chris Roberts, who retired after 23 years with the school. After completing the 2015-16 seasons, UCLA announced Roth was being replaced by Josh Lewin . According to a June 2, 2016 article by David Teel of the Daily Press, Roth will be returning to his East Coast roots, "remain[ing] on the air and with IMG College, developing new, nationally oriented programming from the company's Winston-Salem, N.C., headquarters". Roth also joined the faculty of the Virginia Tech Department of Communications as a professor of practice.

=== ESPN ===
Roth joined ESPN’s college football play-by-play team in 2016 as an announcer for ACC, AAC, MAC, and Pac-12 football games. Roth also has called bowl games for ESPN Radio each year since 2016. He has been teamed with a variety of analysts including Mike Golic, Jr., John Congemi, Ray Bentley, Dustin Fox, and Barrett Jones. Roth also called the NCAA Division II National Championship Game for ESPN in 2019. During the 2020 season, he called the epic BYU vs Coastal Carolina game Mormons vs. Mullets game on ESPN.

=== CBS Sports Network and Westwood One ===
Roth basketball play-by-play duties include assignments for CBS Sports Network and Westwood One Radio. Roth joined the Westwood One radio team in 2020 as a play-by-play announcer of NCAA football and basketball.

== Honors and awards ==
=== Virginia Sports Hall of Fame ===
In April 2013, Roth was inducted into the Virginia Sports Hall of Fame and Museum in Portsmouth, Virginia. Roth was inducted into the Commonwealth's Hall of Fame on the same night as Tech all-America defensive end and Baltimore Ravens Super Bowl Champion Cornell Brown. The two joined Bruce Smith, Antonio Freeman, Dell Curry, Allan Bristow, Johnny Oates, Carroll Dale and other Virginia Tech stars in the Virginia Sports Hall of Fame. As of July 2013, there are 23 Virginia Tech Hokies who have been inducted into the Virginia Sports Hall of Fame.

=== WAER-Syracuse Hall of Fame ===
In August 2014, Roth was inducted into the WAER Hall of Fame along with Sean McDonough, Syracuse University's noncommercial radio station, where he began his sports broadcasting career as a student. He was inducted by Mike Tirico who was a classmate at Syracuse with Roth.

== Quotes ==
1995: "Jim Druckenmiller has pulled off the greatest comeback I've ever seen! TOUCHDOWN TECH! I've never enjoyed saying that more!" Virginia Tech's come-from behind victory at UVA gives the Hokies a bid to the 1995 Sugar Bowl vs. Texas.

2004: "Give it to me Roscoe, Give it to me!" Roth's call of DeAngelo Hall stripping Miami's Roscoe Parrish during Tech's 31-7 win over No.2 Miami at Lane Stadium.

2009: "And the ACC's Giant Killers have done it again. Tonight, Virginia Tech takes down Number One Wake Forest" at the conclusion of Tech's upset of undefeated No. 1 Wake Forest in men's basketball.

2009: "It's a miracle in Blacksburg! Tyrod did it Mikey! Tyrod did it!" Virginia Tech's last-second win over Nebraska in 2009. Roth refers to Virginia Tech quarterback Tyrod Taylor and long-time analyst Mike Burnop.

2013: "That ball was in the air longer than a non-stop flight to Tel Aviv!" After quarterback Logan Thomas threw a long touchdown pass during Virginia Tech's 2013 season.

2019: "Malcolm Perry is having the greatest homecoming since Beyoncé played Coachella." During Tennessee-native Malcolm Perry's 213 yard rushing performance in Navy's win over Kansas State in the 2019 Liberty Bowl game in Memphis.

== Bill Roth's Bowl Streak 1993-2025 ==
Game	City	Network	Result	Analyst/Sideline
1993 Independence Bowl	Shreveport, La.	Virginia Tech Sports Network.	Virginia Tech 45, Indiana 20	Mike Burnop
1994 Gator Bowl	Jacksonville, Fl.	Virginia Tech Sports Network	Tennessee 45, Virginia Tech 23	Mike Burnop
1995 Sugar Bowl	New Orleans, La.	Virginia Tech Sports Network	Virginia Tech 28, Texas 10	Mike Burnop
1996 Orange Bowl	Miami, Fl.	Virginia Tech ISP Sports Network	Nebraska 41, Virginia Tech 21	Mike Burnop
1997 Gator Bowl* (Jan. 1, 1998)	Jacksonville, Fl.	Virginia Tech ISP Sports Network	North Carolina 42, Virginia Tech 3	Mike Burnop
1998 Music City Bowl	Nashville, Tn.	Virginia Tech ISP Sports Network	Virginia Tech 38, Alabama 7	Mike Burnop
1999 Sugar Bowl* (Jan. 4, 2000)	New Orleans, La.	Virginia Tech ISP Sports Network	Florida State 46, Virginia Tech 29	Mike Burnop
2000 Gator Bowl* (Jan. 1, 2001)	Jacksonville, Fl.	Virginia Tech ISP Sports Network	Virginia Tech 41, Clemson 20	Mike Burnop
2001 Gator Bowl* (Jan. 2, 2002)	Jacksonville, Fl.	Virginia Tech ISP Sports Network	Florida State 30, Virginia Tech 17	Mike Burnop
2002 San Francisco Bowl	San Francisco, Ca.	Virginia Tech ISP Sports Network	Virginia Tech 20, Air Force 13	Mike Burnop
2003 Insight Bowl	Phoenix, Az.	Virginia Tech ISP Sports Network	California 52, Virginia Tech 49	Mike Burnop
2004 Sugar Bowl* (Jan. 3, 2005)	New Orleans, La.	Virginia Tech ISP Sports Network	Auburn 16, Virginia Tech 13	Mike Burnop
2005 Gator Bowl* (Jan. 2, 2006)	Jacksonville, Fl	Virginia Tech ISP Sports Network	Virginia Tech 35, Louisville 24	Mike Burnop
2006 Chick-fil-A Bowl	Atlanta, Ga	Virginia Tech ISP Sports Network	Georgia 31, Virginia Tech 24	Mike Burnop
2007 Orange Bowl* (Jan. 3, 2008)	Miami, Fl	Virginia Tech ISP Sports Network	Kansas 24, Virginia Tech 21	Mike Burnop
2008 Orange Bowl* (Jan. 1, 2009)	Miami, FL.	Virginia Tech ISP Sports Network	Virginia Tech 20, Cincinnati 7	Mike Burnop
2009 Chick-fil-A Bowl	Atlanta, Ga.	Virginia Tech ISP Sports Network	Virginia Tech 37, Tennessee 14	Mike Burnop
2010 Orange Bowl* (Jan. 3, 2011)	Miami, Fl.	Virginia Tech ISP Sports Network	Stanford 40, Virginia Tech 12	Mike Burnop
2011 Sugar Bowl* (Jan. 3, 2012)	New Orleans. La.	Virginia Tech IMG Sports Network	Michigan 23, Virginia Tech 20 (OT)	Mike Burnop
2012 Russell Athletic Bowl	Orlando, Fl.	Virginia Tech IMG Sports Network	Virginia Tech 13, Rutgers 10 (OT)	Mike Burnop
2013 Sun Bowl	El Paso, Tx.	Virginia Tech IMG Sports Network	UCLA 42, Virginia Tech 12	Mike Burnop
2014 Military Bowl	Annapolis, MD	Virginia Tech IMG Sports Network	Virginia Tech 33, Cincinnati 17	Mike Burnop
2015 Foster Farms Bowl	Santa Clara, Ca	UCLA IMG Sports Network	Nebraska 37, UCLA 29	Matt Stevens (A), Wayne Cook (S)
2016 Liberty Bowl	Memphis, Tn.	ESPN Radio	Georgia 31, TCU 23	Al Groh (A), Alex Corrdry (S)
2017 Liberty Bowl	Memphis, Tn.	ESPN Radio	Iowa State 21, Memphis 20	Barrett Jones (A), Dawn Davenport (S)
2018 New Mexico Bowl	Albuquerque, NM.	ESPN Radio	Utah State 52, North Texas 13	Barrett Jones (A), Taylor Davis (S)
2019 Liberty Bowl	Memphis, TN	ESPN Radio	Navy 20, Kansas 17	Dustin Fox (A), Taylor Davis (S)
2019 Famous Idaho Potato Bowl	Boise, ID	ESPN	Ohio 30, Nevada 21	John Congemi(A), Kris Budden (S)
2020 Camellia Bowl	Montgomery, AL	ESPN	Buffalo 17, Marshall 10	Dustin Fox (A), Lauren Sisler (S)
2020 Citrus Bowl* (January 1, 2021)	Orlando, FL.	First Team Radio	Northwestern 35, Auburn 19	Hans Olsen (A)
2020 Outback Bowl* (January 2, 2021)	Tampa, Fl.	First Team Radio	Ole Miss 26, Indiana 20	Hans Olsen (A),
2021 Famous Idaho Potato Bowl	Boise, ID	ESPN	Wyoming 52, Kent State 38	Kelly Stouffer (A), Lauren Sisler (S)
2021 Quick Lane Bowl	Detroit, Mi	ESPN	Western Michigan 52, Nevada 24	Dustin Fox (A), Taylor McGregor (S)
2021 Las Vegas Bowl	Las Vegas, NV.	Bowl Season Radio	Wisconsin 20, Arizona State 13	Hans Olsen (A), Tim Murray (S)
2021 Outback Bowl* (January 1, 2022)	Tampa, Fl.	Bowl Season Radio	Arkansas 24, Penn State 10	Hans Olsen (A), Despina Barton (S)
2022 Gasparilla Bowl	Tampa, Fl.	Bowl Season Radio	Wake Forest 27, Missouri 17	John Denton (A), Breanna Sorensen(S)
2022 Dukes Mayo Bowl	Charlotte, NC.	ESPN Radio	Maryland 16, N.C. State 12	Charles Arbuckle (A), Lauren Sisler (S)
2022 Reliaquest Bowl* (January 2, 2023)	Tampa, Fl.	Bowl Season Radio	Mississippi State 19, Illinois 10	Hans Olsen (A), Despina Barton (S)
2023 Gasparilla Bowl	Tampa, Fl.	Bowl Season Radio	Georgia Tech 30, UCF 17	John Denton (A), Jamie Seh (S)
2023 Military Bowl	Annapolis, Md.	Virginia Tech Sports Network	Virginia Tech 41, Tulane 20	Mike Burnop (A), Zach Mackey (S)
2023 Reliaquest Bowl* (January 1, 2024)	Tampa, Fl.	Bowl Season Radio	LSU 35, Wisconsin 31	Hans Olsen (A), Despina Barton (S)
2024 Gasparilla Bowl Bowl	Tampa, Fl.	Bowl Season Radio	Florida 33, Tulane 8	John Denton (A), Bridget Howard (S)
2024 Dukes Mayo Bowl* (Jan. 3, 2025)	Charlotte, NC.	Virginia Tech Sports Network	Minnesota 24, Virginia Tech 10	Mike Burnop (A), Zach Mackey (S)
2025 Gasparilla Bowl Bowl	Tampa, Fl.	Bowl Season Radio	N.C. State 31, Memphis 7	John Denton (A), Breanna Sorensen (S)
