= Sam Roush =

American football player (born 2003)

No. 87 – Chicago Bears
- Position: Tight end
- Roster status: Active

Personal information
- Born: September 6, 2003 (age 23); Atlanta, Georgia, U.S.
- Listed height: 6 ft 6 in (1.98 m)
- Listed weight: 267 lb (121 kg)

Career information
- High school: Lipscomb (Nashville, Tennessee)
- College: Stanford (2022–2025)
- NFL draft: 2026: 3rd round, 69th overall pick

Career history
- Chicago Bears (2026–present)

Awards and highlights
- Second-team All-ACC (2025)

Career NFL statistics as of Week 4, 2026
- Receptions: 3
- Receiving yards: 33
- Stats at Pro Football Reference

Sam Olsen Roush (born September 6, 2003) is an American professional football tight end for the Chicago Bears of the National Football League (NFL). He played college football for the Stanford Cardinal and was selected by the Bears in the third round of the 2026 NFL draft.

== Early life ==
Roush was born on September 6, 2003 in Atlanta, Georgia. Roush attended Valley Christian School in San Jose, California before transferring to Lipscomb Academy in Nashville, Tennessee. He also played defense in high school and was the 2021 Tennessee Co-Defensive Player of the Year. Roush committed to Stanford to play college football.

== College career ==
Roush played at Stanford from 2022 to 2025. He became a starter during his sophomore year in 2023. For his career he had 119 receptions for 1,201 yards and four touchdowns.

=== Statistics ===
Year	Team	GP	Receiving			
Year	Team	GP	Rec	Yds	Avg	TD
2022	Stanford	12	2	34	17.0	0
2023	Stanford	12	28	288	10.3	0
2024	Stanford	12	40	334	8.4	2
2025	Stanford	12	49	545	11.1	2
Career		48	119	1,201	10.1	4

== Professional career ==
Pre-draft measurables
Height	Weight	Arm length	Hand span	Wingspan	40-yard dash	10-yard split	20-yard split	20-yard shuttle	Three-cone drill	Vertical jump	Broad jump	Bench press
6 ft 6 in (1.98 m)	267 lb (121 kg)	30 5/8 in (0.78 m)	10 in (0.25 m)	6 ft 4 3/8 in (1.94 m)	4.70 s	1.61 s	2.72 s	4.27 s	7.02 s	38.5 in (0.98 m)	10 ft 6 in (3.20 m)	25 reps
All values from NFL Combine/Pro Day

Roush was selected by the Chicago Bears in the third round, with the 69th overall pick, of the 2026 NFL Draft. He signed his rookie contract on July 10.

== Personal life ==
Roush's great-uncles Merlin Olsen, Orrin Olsen, and his maternal grandfather Phil Olsen all played in the NFL; a cousin, Hans Olsen, also played in the NFL. His paternal grandfather is John A. Roush, former president of Centre College.
