= John Roush =

John Roush is the name of:

- John A. Roush, American educator, former president of Centre College
- John Roush (American football), former American football player from the University of Oklahoma and the NFL
- J. Edward Roush (1920-2004), American congressman
