= Hans Olsen (American football) =

American football player (born 1977)

No. 67, 72
- Position: Defensive tackle

Personal information
- Born: July 31, 1977 (age 49); Caldwell, Idaho, U.S.
- Listed height: 6 ft 4 in (1.93 m)
- Listed weight: 304 lb (138 kg)

Career information
- High school: Weiser (Weiser, Idaho)
- College: BYU
- NFL draft: 2001: undrafted

Career history
- Indianapolis Colts (2001–2002); Indiana Firebirds (2004); New Orleans VooDoo (2005); Utah Blaze (2006–2007)

Awards and highlights
- Second-team All-Mountain West (2000); AFL All-Ironman Team (2006)
- Stats at Pro Football Reference
- Stats at ArenaFan.com

Hans Christian Olsen (born July 31, 1977) is an American former professional football defensive tackle who played for the Indianapolis Colts of the National Football League (NFL). He played college football for the BYU Cougars.

== Early life ==
Hans Christian Olsen was born on July 31, 1977, in Caldwell, Idaho. He was a four-year letterman in football, track, and wrestling at Weiser High School in Weiser, Idaho. He was a two-way lineman in football, earning all-state honors on both offense and defense. Olsen was also a state champion wrestler.

== College career ==
Olsen enrolled at Brigham Young University to play college football for the Cougars. He redshirted the 1996 season and was a four-year letterman from 1997 to 2000. He played in 11 of 12 games his junior year in 1999, posting 10 solo tackles, 14 assisted tackles, two sacks, one fumble recovery, and two pass breakups. He appeared in 11 of 12 games again as a senior in 2000, earning second-team all-Mountain West Conference honors after recording 16 solo tackles, 25 assisted tackles, one sack, five fumble recoveries, and one pass breakup.

== Professional career ==
After going undrafted in the 2001 NFL draft, Olsen signed with the Indianapolis Colts on April 26. He was waived on September 2 and signed to the practice squad the next day. He was promoted to the active roster on November 28, 2001 and played in two games for the Colts as a reserve defensive tackle. Olsen was waived on September 1, 2002, and signed to the practice squad again on September 3. He was released on September 18 and signed to the practice squad for the third time on September 20, where he spent the remainder of the 2002 season. He signed a reserve/future contract with the Colts on January 6, 2003. He was released on August 26, 2003, after the third of four preseason games.

On November 17, 2003, Olsen signed with the Indiana Firebirds of the Arena Football League (AFL) for the 2004 AFL season. He was an offensive lineman/defensive lineman during his time in the AFL as the league played under ironman rules. He played in all 16 games for the Firebirds in 2004, posting one solo tackles, six assisted tackles, one sack, one forced fumble, and one fumble recovery. The team finished 8–8 and folded after the season.

Olsen was signed by the AFL's New Orleans VooDoo on February 10, 2005. He appeared in all 16 games for the VooDoo during the 2005 season, totaling seven solo tackles, four assisted tackles, and 0.5 sacks as New Orleans went 9–7. The VooDoo suspended operations due to Hurricane Katrina.

The VooDoo's players were reassigned to the Kansas City Brigade. On November 10, 2005, he was traded to the Utah Blaze for Fred Ray and Tim Seder. Olsen played in all 16 games for Utah in 2006, recording five solo tackles, 14 assisted tackles, two sacks, and one pass breakups. The Blaze finished the year 7–9 and lost to the Arizona Rattlers in the playoffs. Olsen was named to the AFL All-Ironman Team for his performance during the 2006 season. Ironman rules were eliminated in 2007, so Olsen mainly played offense in 2007. He played in all 16 games for the second straight year during the 2007 season, posting two solo tackles and three assisted tackles. The Blaze went 8–8 and lost in the playoffs to the Los Angeles Avengers. He was named to the AFL's Al Lucas Hero Team for visiting a fan many times via the Make-A-Wish Foundation. Olsen was released by the Blaze on November 19, 2007.

== Personal life ==
Olsen's uncles, Merlin, Phil, and Orrin Olsen, also played in the NFL. On November 5, 1996, Hans rescued a drowning motorist while fishing with Orrin. His cousin, Sam Roush, plays in the NFL as well.

Olsen was a sports radio broadcaster in Utah from 2006 to January 2026. He co-hosted Hans & Scotty from 2014 to 2026. He left KSL Sports to join GBS Benefits.
