= Phil Olsen =

Phil Olsen may refer to:

- Phil Olsen (American football) (born 1948), American football center and defensive tackle
- Phil Olsen (javelin thrower) (1957—2020), Canadian javelin thrower
