= John A. Roush =

American former academic administrator (born 1950)

John Roush
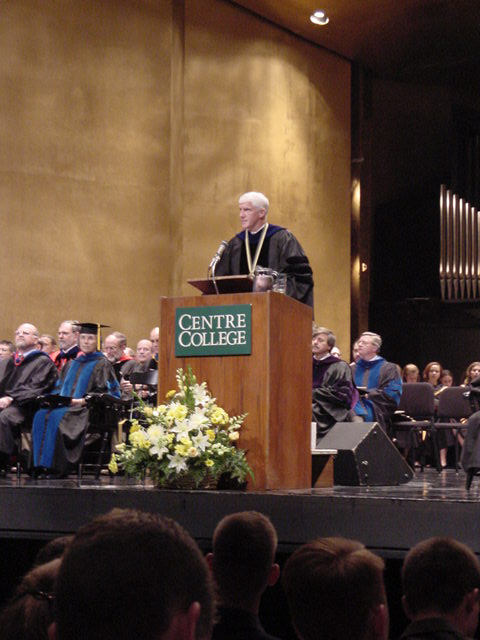
- Roush speaking in September 2000

20th President of Centre College
- In office July 1, 1998 – June 30, 2020
- Preceded by: Michael F. Adams
- Succeeded by: Milton C. Moreland

Personal details
- Born: July 1, 1950 (age 76) Wisconsin, U.S.
- Spouse: Susie Miller (m. 1973)
- Education: Ohio University (BA); Miami University (MEd, PhD)
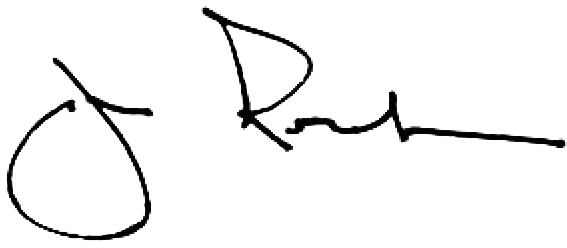
- Signature

Military service
- Branch/service: United States Army
- Rank: Captain

John Allen Roush (born July 1, 1950) is an American former academic administrator who was the 20th president of Centre College from 1998 to 2020. A graduate of Ohio University, Roush earned graduate degrees and began his career at Miami University, where he became executive assistant to the president in 1976. He departed to the University of Richmond in 1982, where he spent sixteen years in administration before being elected to Centre's presidency. During his 22-year term, Centre established four student scholarship programs, nearly doubled the size of its faculty, led several successful fundraising campaigns, and renovated numerous academic, athletic, and residential buildings on campus. He announced his resignation in May 2019, effective June 2020, and was succeeded by Milton C. Moreland upon leaving office. Since that time, he has maintained his position on the University of Richmond board of trustees, received two honorary degrees, and spoken at Wofford College during its opening convocation in September 2021. In May 2021, Centre's Campus Center was renamed the Roush Campus Center, in honor of Roush and his wife, Susie.

== Early life and education ==
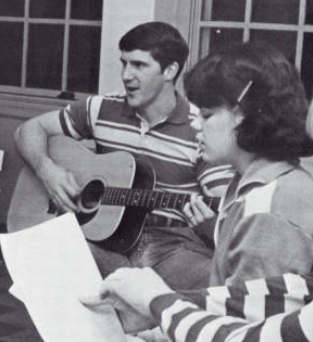
Roush as a grad student at Miami, c. 1979

Roush was born on July 1, 1950, in Wisconsin and was raised in Kettering, Ohio. He graduated from Fairmont High School and holds a bachelor's degree in English from Ohio University. At Ohio, he was a member of the football team from 1969 to 1971 and was on separate occasions named Scholar Athlete of the Year and National Christian Athlete of the Year. A running back, he accumulated 184 rushing yards and 38 receiving yards over his collegiate football career. He also met his future wife, Susie Miller, while attending Ohio. He took part in the Reserve Officer Training Corps and was commissioned as a captain in the United States Army. He earned a Master of Education degree and a Ph.D. in educational administration, both from Miami University, in 1973 and 1979 respectively. Roush and Miller were married in August 1973.

== Career ==
Roush became an assistant football coach at Miami University in 1972 and later became executive assistant to the president in 1976. He left in January 1982 to take the same position at the University of Richmond, where he helped to found the Jepson School of Leadership Studies. Working under presidents E. Bruce Heilman and Richard L. Morrill, he was vice president for planning and secretary to the board of trustees in addition to his role as executive assistant to the president. He was elected to the presidency of Centre College in Danville, Kentucky, by the school's board of trustees on January 30, 1998. He took office on July 1 of that year.

A major change was made to the school's academic calendar shortly into Roush's presidency with the change from a 4-2-4 system to a 4-1-4 system; that is, during the "winter term", when students were previously taking two classes, they would now take only one. This change also involved the lengthening of the fall and spring semesters by one week each and the shortening of the winter term, now called CentreTerm, from six weeks to just over three. As of 2026, the school still employs the CentreTerm 4-1-4 system. A further curriculum revision came in 2019, when the general education requirements were replaced with a new system which featured the "Doctrina Lux Mentis" course sequence, named for the school's motto, which translates from Latin to "learning is the light of the mind".

Two vice presidential debates were held at Centre's Norton Center for the Arts during Roush's presidency. The first was held on October 5, 2000, between Republican nominee Dick Cheney, the running mate of George W. Bush, and Democratic nominee Joe Lieberman, the running mate of Al Gore. The second was held on October 11, 2012, between Democrat Joe Biden, the running mate of Barack Obama, and Republican Paul Ryan, the running mate of Mitt Romney.

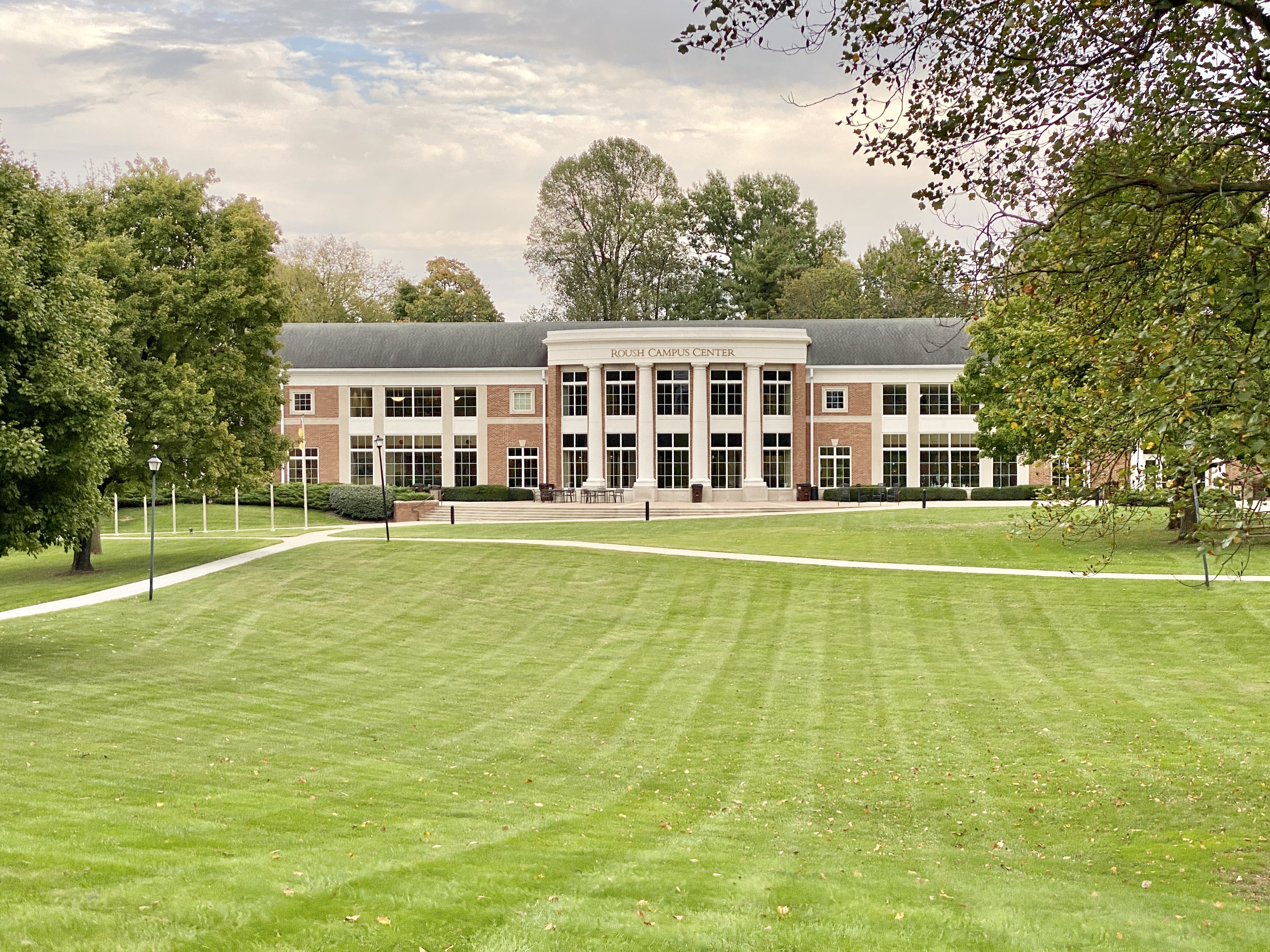
Roush Campus Center, pictured in 2021

During Roush's term, several buildings on campus were renovated, including the Campus Center, Stuart Hall, Ruby Cheek House, the Norton Center for the Arts, and Young Hall. The College Centre, a $24 million expansion and renovation of Sutcliffe Hall, the school's athletic building, and Crounse Hall, which houses the library, was completed as well. Several new buildings were added, including Pearl Hall, a $15 million project, and the Student Center. Roush also launched several successful fundraising campaigns, including A More Perfect Centre, which raised nearly $170 million. In July 2013, the college was announced to be the recipient of a $250 million donation (equivalent to $346 million in 2025) from the private trust of former student Robert Brockman, which was set to finance scholarships for several hundred students in the computational sciences, natural sciences, and economics; the donation, which was offered entirely in stock, was withdrawn in September 2013 following what was termed a "significant capital market event". Enrollment increased significantly during the time Roush was in the role, from approximately 1,000 students when he took office to 1,400 when he left. Faculty numbers increased from 80 to approximately 140 during his tenure, and fifteen endowed professorships were established.

During his tenure, Centre established numerous scholarship programs: the Bonner Program, a service-based scholarship, in 2008; the Brown Fellows Program, a full-ride scholarship in partnership with the University of Louisville, in 2009; the Lincoln Scholars Program, a full-ride scholarship with an emphasis on leadership, in 2016; and the Grissom Scholars Program, a full-tuition scholarship for first-generation students which graduated its first cohort in 2019. The Centre Scholars Program, which honored junior faculty members, was also established.

A student sit-in protest occurred in Old Centre, the college's main administration building, on May 2–3, 2018. The approximately 100 students protesting cited racial problems and demanded that the school's department of public safety have an officer on-duty at all times and that the college hire a full-time director of diversity and inclusion. Roush met with protesters for four hours on May 3 and the sit-in ended that day. In December of that year, Andrea Abrams, at Centre since 2007, was appointed chief diversity officer after having previously held the role in an interim capacity.

Centre celebrated its bicentennial in January 2019. Roush announced on May 24 of that year that he would retire effective June 30, 2020. He concluded his 22-year term as the third-longest-serving president in the school's history, after John C. Young, who led the college for 27 years in the nineteenth century, and Thomas A. Spragens, who held the position for 24 years. Milton C. Moreland, then-provost and vice president for academic affairs at Rhodes College in Memphis, Tennessee, was announced as Roush's successor on February 5, 2020. In an interview several days before he left office, Roush described the September 11 attacks, the 2008 financial crisis, and the COVID-19 pandemic as the most challenging times of his tenure. Following his retirement, Roush spent the 2021 spring football season as Centre's volunteer running backs coach.

Roush continued his membership on the board of trustees of the University of Richmond following his retirement from Centre. He was the speaker at Wofford College's opening convocation on September 2, 2021.

== Legacy ==
Roush and his wife, who have two sons, are the namesakes of the Roush Campus Center, which was renamed for them on May 29, 2021. A grandson, Sam Roush, plays in the NFL for the Chicago Bears.

Roush was the recipient of an honorary degree from Ohio University on June 18, 2020, awarded for his "achievements in higher education administration", and received another from Wofford College on September 2, 2021, at their opening convocation.

Preceded by Michael F. Adams	President of Centre College; 1998–2020	Succeeded by Milton C. Moreland
