= Milton C. Moreland =

American academic administrator and archaeologist

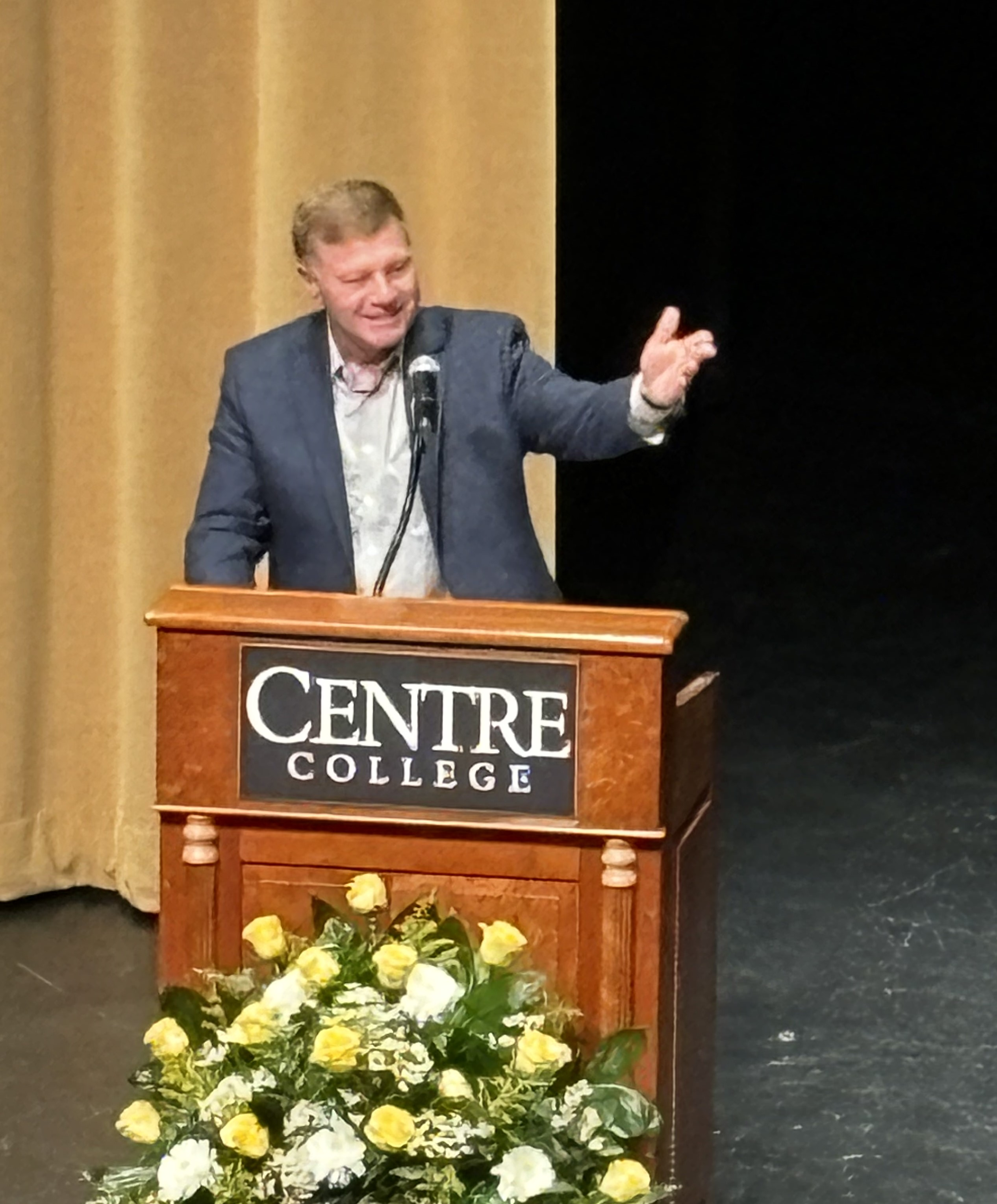
- Moreland speaking in 2024

21st President of Centre College
- Incumbent
- Assumed office July 1, 2020
- Preceded by: John A. Roush

Personal details
- Born: February 5, 1966 (age 60) Boise, Idaho, U.S.
- Spouse: Dina Pritchett (m. 1986)
- Children: 2
- Education: University of Memphis (BA); Claremont Graduate University (MA, PhD)

Milton Carl Moreland (born February 5, 1966) is an American academic administrator and archaeologist who is the 21st and current president of Centre College in Danville, Kentucky. A graduate of the University of Memphis, Moreland taught for eight years at Huntingdon College and was a member of the faculty and administration for thirteen years at Rhodes College, serving for some time as the dean of faculty, vice president for academic affairs, and provost. In February 2020, he was announced as president of Centre College; he assumed office on July 1, 2020, succeeding John A. Roush, and was formally inaugurated in October 2021.

== Early life and education ==
Milton Carl Moreland was born on February 5, 1966, in Boise, Idaho. He earned a Bachelor of Arts in history from the University of Memphis, where he graduated with honors. This was followed by a Master of Arts and PhD, both in religious studies, from Claremont Graduate University in Claremont, California. Moreland wrote his honors thesis on the Nag Hammadi library.

== Career ==
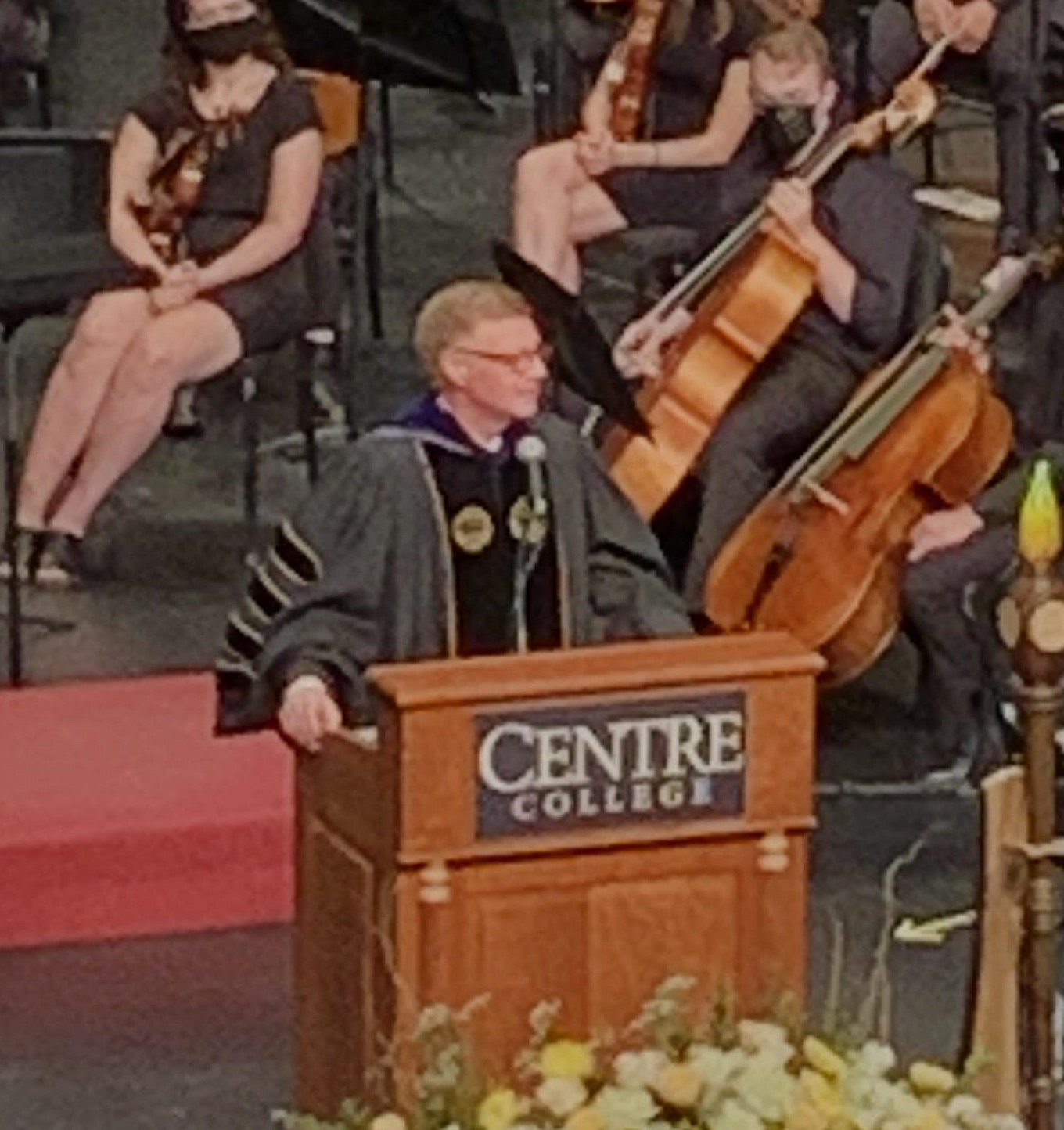
Moreland delivering his inaugural address on October 14, 2021

Moreland began his teaching career in 1995. He taught at Huntingdon College as an assistant professor until 2003, when he joined the faculty of Rhodes College in Memphis, Tennessee, as an assistant professor of religious studies. He was eventually promoted to associate professor and full professor. He also served as the director of the Rhodes Institute of Regional Studies and chaired the archaeology program in addition to teaching archaeology. In December 2015, Rhodes announced that Moreland had been selected from a national search to be the college's vice president for academic affairs and the dean of faculty; he had been serving as dean on an interim basis for the previous 18 months. Moreland additionally served as the provost at Rhodes. He was presented with Rhodes's Jameson M. Jones Award for Outstanding Faculty Service on August 17, 2012.

He also served on the senior staff of Sepphoris Regional Archaeological Project, located in Galilee, for upwards of two decades. Moreland's scholarship focuses on the New Testament and history of Christianity. Upon his departure from Rhodes, Dr. Katherine Clay Bassard was named his successor as provost and VP for academic affairs, effective July 1, 2020.

On February 5, 2020, Moreland was announced as the 21st president of Centre College, succeeding John A. Roush, following a unanimous vote of the presidential search committee. He assumed office on July 1, 2020, and much of the beginning of his term took place during the COVID-19 pandemic. He was officially inaugurated in a ceremony held at the Norton Center for the Arts on October 14, 2021. Among those that spoke at the ceremony were Crit Luallen and Jacqueline Coleman, the former and incumbent lieutenant governors of Kentucky and graduates of Centre in 1974 and 2004, respectively.

The first incoming class of Moreland's administration totaled 359 new students, bringing Centre's total enrollment for the 2020–21 academic year to 1,333 students. The renovation of Franklin W. Olin Hall, which began in summer 2019, was completed in time and opened to students at the beginning of the 2021 spring term, including the installation of a Foucault pendulum in the building's north stairwell. Moreland and the college announced a $50 million project to build a new athletics center, including replacements for Boles Natatorium and Farris Stadium, in April 2021. Andy Frye Stadium, the school's new football facility, opened in 2022. In addition, the school added a business major in fall 2021.

== Personal life ==
Moreland's wife, Dina (née Pritchett), is a former professional and national team racquetball player and pharmaceutical salesperson. She attended the University of Memphis, like Milton, and has been an elementary school teacher since 2003. The couple married in December 1986 and they have two children.
