= Merlin Olsen =

American football player, announcer, and actor (1940–2010)

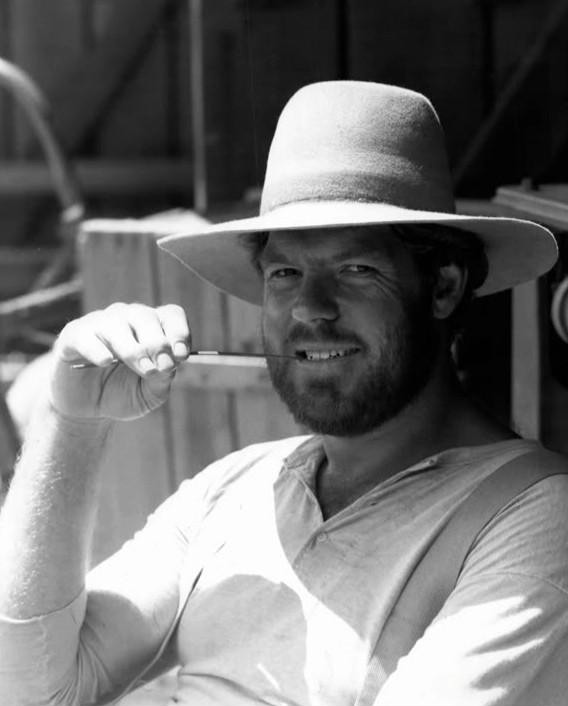
- Olsen on Little House on the Prairie, 1977

No. 74
- Position: Defensive tackle

Personal information
- Born: September 15, 1940; Logan, Utah, U.S.
- Died: March 11, 2010 (aged 69); Duarte, California, U.S.
- Listed height: 6 ft 5 in (1.96 m)
- Listed weight: 270 lb (122 kg)

Career information
- High school: Logan
- College: Utah State (1959–1961)
- NFL draft: 1962: 1st round, 3rd overall pick
- AFL draft: 1962: 1st round, 2nd overall pick

Career history
- Los Angeles Rams (1962–1976)

Awards and highlights
- 5× First-team All-Pro (1966–1970); 3× Second-team All-Pro (1963–1965); 14× Pro Bowl (1962–1975); NFL 1960s All-Decade Team; NFL 1970s All-Decade Team; NFL 75th Anniversary All-Time Team; NFL 100th Anniversary All-Time Team; Bert Bell Award (1974); St. Louis Football Ring of Fame; Los Angeles Rams No. 74 retired; Outland Trophy (1961); Consensus All-American (1961); First-team All-American (1960)

Career NFL statistics
- Fumble recoveries: 9
- Interceptions: 1
- Total touchdowns: 1
- Sacks: 91.0
- Stats at Pro Football Reference
- Pro Football Hall of Fame
- College Football Hall of Fame

Merlin Jay Olsen (/ˈoʊlsən/; September 15, 1940 – March 11, 2010) was an American professional football player, announcer, and actor. For his entire 15-year professional football career, he was a defensive tackle with the Los Angeles Rams in the National Football League (NFL). He was selected to play in the Pro Bowl 14 times — every year but his last. The only other football players to have matched or exceeded that number are Bruce Matthews, Tony Gonzalez, Peyton Manning, and Tom Brady, who is the only NFL player to have played more times in the Pro Bowl, with 15 selections.

In 1961, Olsen received the Outland Trophy, awarded to the best lineman of the year in college football. He is a member of the Pro Football Hall of Fame and the College Football Hall of Fame.

As an actor, he portrayed farmer Jonathan Garvey on Little House on the Prairie. He later starred in the drama series Father Murphy. Olsen also was active as a commentator on football broadcasts.

== Early life ==
Merlin Olsen was born in Logan, Utah, where his parents, Merle Barrus and Lynn Jay Olsen, graduated from Utah State University (USU) and began their careers. His father was a professor at the university while his mother had graduated in elementary education. Merlin was the second of nine siblings and the eldest of three brothers. The family opened their home to host, feed, sleep, or tutor anyone in the neighborhood.

Merlin pursued athletics in high school but was cut from the basketball team while in grade 9, told by the coach that athletics wasn't for him and that he should take up the arts. Later, Olsen turned down a football scholarship to Stanford University to play for USU. Classmate Ross Peterson described him as a "natural, big, strong leader ... he could have been successful at anything". His brothers Phil and Orrin also played football in the NFL; Merlin and Phil played together for the Los Angeles Rams from 1971 to 1974.

== College career ==
Olsen attended Utah State University, where he became a member of the Sigma Chi fraternity, and was a three-year letterman in football as a defensive tackle. He graduated from the College of Business and Social Sciences at USU with a bachelor's degree in finance in 1962 and a master's degree in economics in 1971. He later received an honorary doctorate degree in business from the Huntsman School.

In football, as a senior, he was a consensus All-America selection and was the winner of the Outland Trophy. After Olsen's junior year in 1960, he was also named All-American by the Football Writers Association of America and Newspaper Enterprise Association. He was also All-Conference in both 1960 and 1961. Olsen and Utah State were in the 1960 Sun Bowl, losing to New Mexico State, 20–13. Led by Olsen, the Aggie defense held the New Mexico State Aggies to just 44 rushing yards on 32 carries.

The Aggie defense Olsen anchored as a senior gave up an average of 50.8 rushing yards (which led the nation), 88.6 passing yards, and 139.4 total yards which all still stand as school records for defense. The 1961 Aggie defense gave up an average 7.8 points a game, which is second in team history behind Olsen's 1960 team, which allowed 6.5 points per game. Additionally, the Aggie defense held four opponents to less than 100 total yards. One, the Idaho Vandals, was held to a school-record 23 total yards, with the Aggies winning 69–0.

The Aggies, not known as a national power football program, finished 10th in both the AP and UPI post-season polls, the only time that has occurred in school history. The Aggies had a combined 18–3–1 record during Olsen's junior and senior seasons under coach John Ralston and were conference champions those two seasons as well.

The Sigma Chi fraternity, has an annual Merlin Olsen Day of Service named in his honor, where brothers are encouraged to give back to their communities.

=== Awards and honors ===
Olsen played in the East-West Shrine Game in 1961 and in 2003 was voted to the game's Hall of Fame. He also played in the Hula Bowl after his senior season and was voted MVP of the game.

Olsen is a member of the State of Utah's Sports Hall of Fame, the Utah State University Sports Hall of Fame and USU's All-Century Football Team. In 2000, he was selected by Sports Illustrated as one of the State of Utah's Top 50 Athletes of the Century. He was voted to the All-Academic All-America Hall of Fame in 1988. In 1969, he was voted to the Newspaper Enterprise Association All-Time All-America team with collegiate greats such as Bronko Nagurski, Red Grange, Jim Thorpe, and O. J. Simpson, among others.

In 2008, Olsen was named to the 75th Anniversary All-Sun Bowl Team to commemorate the Sun Bowl Association's Diamond Anniversary.

Utah State University announced the intention to name its football field after Olsen during a ceremony in Logan during halftime of the USU-St. Mary's basketball game on December 5, 2009.

Olsen was also a three-time academic All-American at Utah State and graduated summa cum laude in 1962 with a degree in finance.

== Professional football career ==
After college, Olsen was selected by both the Los Angeles Rams of the National Football League (NFL) and the Denver Broncos of the rival American Football League (AFL) in each draft's first round in 1962. He chose the security of the NFL and signed with the Rams. Olsen's first contract was for around $50,000(equivalent to $557,847.68 in 2026) for two years, plus a signing bonus. It was 1962, and the average football player salary at the time was around $12,000 (equivalent to $133,883.44 in 2026) a year. He was the first USU Aggie to be drafted in the 1st round of the NFL draft.

Olsen played professionally for the Rams from 1962 to 1976. A leading defensive star of his era, he missed only two games in his 15-season NFL career. He was named the NFL's Rookie of the Year in 1962 and was First-team All-Pro in 1964, and 1966 through 1970. He was voted Second-team All-Pro in 1965, 1973 and 1974.

Olsen almost ended up on offense, but was later moved to the defensive line after a few experiments in practice. Soon he became part of one of the best front fours in NFL history. Deacon Jones, Rosey Grier, and Lamar Lundy joined Olsen on the defensive line in 1963 that was nicknamed "The Fearsome Foursome". He was named the AP NFL Defensive Player of the Week for week 12 in 1965. Olsen scored his first touchdown in that game. Though Jones was the face of the Fearsome Foursome, it was Olsen who did much of the heavy lifting. Olsen would often be double or tripled teamed by offensive linemen, thus leaving Jones one on one or with a clear path to the ball carrier.

Throughout the 1960s, this quartet terrorized opposing offenses. Olsen's play helped the Rams to the playoffs in 1967 and 1969. He was voted the club's Outstanding Defensive Lineman from 1967 to 1970 by the Los Angeles Rams Alumni. In week 14 of the 1967 season, Olsen and the rest of the Fearsome Foursome were named the AP NFL Defensive Players of the Week for their performance against the Baltimore Colts. In the 1970s, Olsen continued his dominant play at defensive tackle and his 11 sacks in 1972 were second on the team. After week 8 in 1972, Olsen was named the Associated Press NFL Defensive Player of the Week for the third time in his career.

The Rams won the NFC West crown in 1973 through 1976 thanks in part to the play of Olsen. They ranked first in the NFL in run defense in 1973 and 1974 and finished second in sacking opposing passers both years. In 1973, Olsen was voted the NFLPA NFC Defensive Lineman of the Year and the next season, 1974, he was the recipient of Bert Bell Award as the NFL MVP as voted by the Maxwell Football Club. Olsen accepted the award "on behalf of all who toil in the NFL trenches". In 1975 and 1976, the Rams defense finished second in the NFL against the run while ranking in the top five in sacking opposing quarterbacks and compiling a 22-5-1 record over those two seasons.

Olsen's last game was the NFC Championship game in 1976 at Bloomington, Minnesota. The Vikings took advantage on a freak play early in the game. A blocked field goal returned 90 yards for a touchdown shocked the Rams in the first quarter. The defense was later victimized by a couple of big plays by the Vikings. The Rams came up short, losing 24–13, bringing the storied career of the Rams' finest defensive tackle to an end.

Olsen made the Pro Bowl a then-record 14 times, missing it only in his final year. He was inducted into the Pro Football Hall of Fame in 1982 in his first year of eligibility; he selected his college position coach Tony Knap as his presenter. In 1999, Olsen was ranked 25th on The Sporting News' list of the 100 Greatest Football Players.

== Post-football career ==
Olsen enjoyed continued success after the NFL as a broadcaster, actor, and businessman.

Olsen served as a television color commentator, teaming mostly with Dick Enberg on NBC's coverage of the AFC during the late 1970s and almost all of the 1980s. He and Enberg also teamed for four Super Bowls (XV, XVII, XX and XXIII), as well as nine Rose Bowls from 1980 to 1988. Olsen also worked Super Bowl XIII in 1979 with Curt Gowdy and John Brodie (Enberg was then serving as pre-game/halftime/post-game host). In 1989, Olsen was replaced by Bill Walsh as NBC's lead NFL color commentator. For the 1989 season, Olsen worked with Charlie Jones on NBC's broadcasts. In 1990 and 1991, he moved to CBS Sports doing NFL games with Dick Stockton.

Olsen developed a successful career as an actor. He appeared as the character Little George in the John Wayne movie, The Undefeated, with Rams teammate Roman Gabriel, in 1969.

In 1970, he appeared once on Petticoat Junction, playing mountaineer Merlin Fergus in the episode "With This Ring".

When Little House on the Prairie actor Victor French left to star in his own comedy Carter Country in 1977, Olsen was tapped to play Michael Landon's new sidekick Jonathan Garvey for several years. One memorable quote from his character's son Andy Garvey, "My pa doesn't know anything about football!" came when Andy's friends suggested that Jonathan coach their football team.

Olsen played the starring role of John Michael Murphy in the 1981–83 NBC television drama series Father Murphy.

In the Highway to Heaven episode 2.12 ("The Good Doctor"), the main character, Alex, tells Mark Gordon (Victor French) that "All I could see was the flowers and the beard. I thought you were Merlin Olsen." This is an inside joke since Olsen, Landon, and French were in the TV series Little House on the Prairie earlier in their careers.

Olsen's last acting work was in the short-lived 1988 TV series Aaron's Way.

Olsen was also the commercial spokesman for FTD Florists for many years. A part-time resident of the Coachella Valley, Olsen was the longtime radio and television spokesman for Palm Desert-based El Paseo Bank.

Olsen also appeared in many Sigma Chi fraternity promotional campaigns; he and his brother Phil were Life Loyal Sigs, Significant Sigs (given to members for distinguishing acts outside the fraternity), and members of the Order of Constantine (given for service to the Fraternity). Olsen donated one of his cleats, which were bronzed, to be used during the annual football rivalry between two Las Vegas high schools, Eldorado High School and Chaparral High School, which both opened in 1973. Each year, Olsen presented the "trophy" in the ceremony at the rivalry game.

Olsen often co-hosted the Children's Miracle Network telethons, a humanitarian organization founded in 1983 by Marie Osmond and John Schneider.

== Awards ==
He was named the Walter Camp Man of the Year in 1982 and Athlete of the Century for the state of Utah. During halftime of a basketball game between Utah State, Olsen's alma mater, and Saint Mary's on December 5, 2009, Utah State University announced that the playing surface inside Romney Stadium, home stadium for the university's football program, would be named Merlin Olsen Field in Olsen's honor. Because of Olsen's illness, Utah State decided not to wait until the 2010 football season to hold the ceremony; he was able to attend the game, but did not speak. A sculpture of Olsen was unveiled in a plaza south of the stadium during an official dedication ceremony in Fall 2010.

Olsen was inducted into the Utah Sports Hall of Fame in 1979, the College Football Hall of Fame in 1980, the Pro Football Hall of Fame in 1982 (his first year of eligibility), the National High School Hall of Fame in 1987, and the Utah Tourism Hall of Fame in 1998. In 2010, he was inducted into the California Sports Hall of Fame alongside Bill Walton, Dwight Stones, Jim Otto, and others.

In 1983, Olsen served as Grand Marshal of the Rose Parade.

== Personal life ==
On March 30, 1962, Olsen married Susan Wakley, a fellow USU student. They had three children: Kelly, Jill, and Nathan. Olsen was a member of the Church of Jesus Christ of Latter-day Saints and a resident of San Marino, California. His nephew Hans, son of his brother Clark, also played in the NFL with the Indianapolis Colts. A great-nephew, Sam Roush, plays in the NFL for the Chicago Bears.

Olsen was diagnosed with peritoneal mesothelioma in 2009, and underwent three courses of chemotherapy. In December 2009, he filed a lawsuit against 25 defendants including NBC Studios, NBC Universal, 20th Century Fox, Georgia Pacific, Sherwin-Williams, and Lennox Corp. for allegedly exposing him to the asbestos which he claimed had caused his cancer.

Olsen died on March 11, 2010, at City of Hope National Medical Center in Duarte, California, at age 69. Olsen is buried at San Gabriel Cemetery in San Gabriel, California.

== Filmography ==
=== Film ===
Year	Title	Role	Notes
1969	The Undefeated	Little George	
1971	One More Train to Rob	Eli Jones	
1971	Something Big	Sgt. Fitzsimmons	
1975	Mitchell	Benton	

=== Television ===
Year	Title	Role	Notes
1970	Petticoat Junction	Merlin Fergus	Episode: "With This Ring"
1973	Kung Fu	Perlee Skowrin	Episode: "Nine Lives"
1974	Dr. Simon Locke	The Cat	Episode: "The Killer"
1977–1981	Little House on the Prairie	Jonathan Garvey	51 episodes
1978	A Fire in the Sky	Stan Webster	Television film
1980	The Golden Moment: An Olympic Love Story	Todd Simms	Television film
1981	Walking Tall	Webb McClain	Episode: "Hitman"
1981–1983	Father Murphy	John Michael Murphy	34 episodes
1982	The Juggler of Notre Dame	Jonas	Television film
1984	Time Bomb	Jake Calahan	Television film
1986	Fathers and Sons	Buddy Landau	4 episodes
1988	Aaron's Way	Aaron Miller	14 episodes, (final appearance)

Preceded by John Brodie	NFL on NBC lead analyst (with John Brodie in 1978); 1978–1988	Succeeded by Bill Walsh
Preceded by Don Meredith	Super Bowl television color commentator (AFC package carrier); 1978-1988	Succeeded by Bob Trumpy
