= Orrin Olsen =

American football player (born 1953)

No. 52
- Position: Center

Personal information
- Born: July 7, 1953 (age 73); Logan, Utah, U.S.
- Listed height: 6 ft 1 in (1.85 m)
- Listed weight: 245 lb (111 kg)

Career information
- High school: Orem (Orem, Utah)
- College: BYU
- NFL draft: 1976: 8th round, 222nd overall pick

Career history
- Kansas City Chiefs (1976)

Career NFL statistics
- Games played: 14
- Games started: 0
- Stats at Pro Football Reference

Orrin James Olsen (born July 7, 1953) is an American former professional football player who was a center for the Kansas City Chiefs of the National Football League (NFL). He played college football for the BYU Cougars. Olsen played one season with the Chiefs in 1976, which was notable because two of his brothers, Merlin and Phil, were also playing in the league at the time.

== Early life ==
Olsen was born in Logan, Utah, and is the youngest of Lynn and Merle Olsen’s nine children. He attended Orem High School in Orem, Utah. An all-around athlete, Olsen was named All-American in football his senior year and set a state record in discus while competing on the track team.

== College career ==
Olsen attended Brigham Young University in Provo, Utah, where he majored in business management and was a three-year letterman for the football team. He was coached by LaVell Edwards. His junior year, he was named pre-season All-American and first-team all-conference. BYU won the Western Athletic Conference championship that season and played in the Fiesta Bowl. In 1975, his senior season, Olsen was again named first-team all-conference. He was recognized for academic excellence by the NCAA, which awarded him a postgraduate scholarship. Olsen was also invited to participate in the Blue-Gray all-star game held in Montgomery, Alabama and the Coaches All-America Game in Lubbock, Texas.

In addition to his contributions to the football team, Olsen competed as a discus thrower on the BYU track team and participated in the NCAA championships.

== Professional career ==
Olsen was selected 222nd overall by the Chiefs in the eighth round of the 1976 NFL draft. His lone season with the Chiefs was unique because his brothers Merlin and Phil were also playing in the league, marking one of the rare times in NFL history that three brothers have played at the same time. Since 1985, Olsen has worked for LDS Philanthropies as a Donor Liaison.

== Personal life ==
Olsen currently lives in Alpine, Utah. He is a member of the Church of Jesus Christ of Latter-day Saints. He and his wife, Sandy, are the parents of seven children. Olsen is a skilled woodworker and has made hundreds of custom canes, including canes made for prominent Utah leaders such as Gordon B. Hinckley and Mike Leavitt.

Olsen was a member of the Mormon Tabernacle Choir from 1973–74.

Olsen's great-nephew, Sam Roush, plays in the NFL for the Chicago Bears.
