= Tech Talk Live =

Tech Talk Live (formerly called the Hokie Hotline) is a weekly radio show, hosted by Hokies play-by-play announcer Evan Hughes, dedicated to discussion of Virginia Tech Hokies football and men's basketball. The show airs every Monday night at 7pm during the school year.

== Content and Schedule ==
The first show of each season airs the Monday before the first football game. The Monday after the last Virginia Tech football game is the final time of the season the show will discuss, or feature coaches and guests solely to talk about, Hokies football. After the final Virginia Tech basketball game of the season, the show broadcasts for the final time of the season the following Monday, after which the show is on hiatus during the summer until the beginning of the next football season.

The format has varied over the years. When it was previously called the Hokie Hotline, the format was that of a call-in show. In recent years, guests have answered questions submitted via e-mail.

== Location ==
Starting in 2007, the Hokie Hotline is broadcast in front of a live audience at Awful Arthurs located in downtown Blacksburg, Virginia inside the Kent Square shopping center. Audience members are invited to participate by asking questions same as listeners are invited to call-in with questions. Until 2007, the show was broadcast from Beamers' Restaurant in Christiansburg, Virginia.

== Guest appearances ==
In season, head coaches Frank Beamer and Seth Greenberg join the show and answer questions from the audience and callers. Virginia Tech Athletic Director Jim Weaver is a frequent guest and usually appears during the first 15–30 minutes of the show. Other assistant coaches, for both football and men's basketball, will join the show during the first hour (or during basketball season will appear in a rare absence of Seth Greenberg).

== Radio ==
In Blacksburg, the show can be heard on Virginia Tech sports' flagship radio station WBRW-FM 105.3 The Bear. The show is carried on every station that carries Virginia Tech football, as well as on Yahoo! Sports.

== Notes ==
- The Hokie Hotline is a presentation of ISP Sports.
- The headline sponsor is Advance Auto Parts

== See also ==
- Virginia Tech Hokies men's basketball
- Virginia Tech Hokies football
- ISP Sports
- WBRW-FM — VT Sports Flagship radio station
- Frank Beamer — Head Football Coach
- Seth Greenberg — Head Basketball Coach
