= Phil Olsen (American football) =

American football player (born 1948)

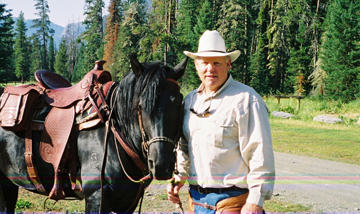
- Olsen in 2004

No. 72, 58
- Position: Defensive tackle / center

Personal information
- Born: April 26, 1948 (age 78); Logan, Utah, U.S.
- Listed height: 6 ft 5 in (1.96 m)
- Listed weight: 265 lb (120 kg)

Career information
- High school: Logan
- College: Utah State
- NFL draft: 1970: 1st round, 4th overall pick

Career history
- Boston Patriots (1970)*; Los Angeles Rams (1971–1974); Denver Broncos (1975–1976, 1977*); Buffalo Bills (1978)*
- * Offseason or practice squad member only

Awards and highlights
- Consensus All-American (1969); Utah State Aggies No. 90 retired

Career NFL statistics
- Tackles: 68
- Stats at Pro Football Reference

Phillip Vernor Olsen (born April 26, 1948) is an American former professional football player who was a center and defensive tackle in the National Football League (NFL) for the Los Angeles Rams and Denver Broncos. He was also a member of the Buffalo Bills. Olsen played college football for the Utah State Aggies. He is the younger brother of Pro Football Hall of Fame member Merlin Olsen.

== Early life ==
Olsen was born to Lynn Jay and Merle Olsen. He attended Logan High School in Logan, Utah from 1963 to 1966. He was a three-year starter on the varsity football team as defensive tackle and offensive tackle. An all-around athlete, he earned eight varsity letters in football, basketball and track. While at Logan High, Olsen was voted All-Division, All-Region, All-State, and All-American recognition in football, as well as being voted All-Division, All-Region in basketball (averaging 18 points a game as a senior). He was on the top 100 recruits list in football in 1966. He received over 40 college football scholarship offers, and made campus visits to Stanford, Iowa, Utah, BYU, and Purdue.

== College career ==
Phil Olsen was a three-year letterman and three-year starter, and in 1969 was a consensus All-America selection for the Utah State Aggies in Logan. Olsen was an Alpha Sigma Nu Honorary as one of top 12 USU Seniors, 1970, and like his brother Merlin is a member of the Sigma Chi fraternity. Olsen was also the Aggie Team Captain, 1969 Team MVP, and the 1969 USU Athlete of the Year. He received the Wayne Estes Memorial Award, 1970 for "Top USU Student/Athlete/Citizen". His jersey No. 90 was retired in 1970. After his senior season he played in the East West Shrine Game, the Hula Bowl, and College All-Star games.

In Olsen's junior year of 1968 the Aggies were 7–3 and had wins over Wisconsin, Memphis, West Texas State, Utah and BYU. He was voted honorable mention All-America honors that season.

In his sophomore year of 1967 the Aggies were 7–2–1 and were seven points from a 10–0 season. USU lost to Colorado State 16–14 on a controversial officiating call that cost the team a potential game-winning field goal attempt. The Aggies also lost to New Mexico State 10–9 on a failed two-point conversion that tipped off the receiver's hands in the end zone, which would have won the game. USU tied Wichita State 3–3 in the season opener, in which the Aggie defense held Wichita State to 65 total yards and −2 yards rushing. (Former Dallas Cowboys and Miami Dolphins coach Jimmy Johnson was on the WSU coaching staff at that time.) Wichita State amassed only 65 yards in that game, the third-best effort in USU history. The Aggies held San Diego State to −5 yards rushing and Pacific to −35 yards rushing, setting the then school record in that category in the process.

Olsen was co-captain of the freshman football team and played on the freshman basketball team as well (freshmen were not allowed to play NCAA varsity sports until 1972). Dale Brown, of LSU fame, was Olsen's basketball coach as a freshman. That 1966–67 freshman basketball team still holds the record for most wins by a freshman team at USU.

Olsen was inducted into the State of Utah's Sports Hall of Fame in 1985, and was a member of USU's All-Century Football Team. Inducted into the Utah State University Sports Hall of Fame in 1994. In 2000, he was selected by Sports Illustrated as one of the State of Utah's Top 50 Athletes of the Century. From 2002–2019 he was a finalist for the College Football Hall of Fame. He was also named by Deseret News the 14th best football player to come out of the State of Utah.

== Professional career ==
Olsen was selected in the first round with the fourth overall pick in the 1970 NFL draft by the Boston Patriots. Prior to reporting to the Patriots, he suffered a severe knee injury in practice the week of the College All-Star game in Chicago, Illinois when defensive tackle Mike McCoy of Notre Dame fell on his right knee, ending his 1970 season.

Olsen was declared a free agent by NFL Commissioner Pete Rozelle after the Patriots failed to pick up his option year by the deadline date stated on his contract. He signed with the Los Angeles Rams on July 14, 1971. In the third of only four times the NFL exercised the Rozelle rule, the Patriots received as compensation a 1972 first-round selection (17th overall– traded to New York Giants for Fred Dryer) and $35,000 to recoup Olsen's signing bonus on July 22 and a third-round pick in the same draft (73rd overall–Jim White) on January 24, 1972. He suffered a second injury to the same knee after winning the starting position at right defensive tackle, but came back after five weeks to be the starter for the Rams in 1971 and 1972 next to his brother, Merlin Olsen. Merlin and Phil played side-by-side as defensive tackles for the Los Angeles Rams in 1971 and 1972, the only time in NFL history this has ever happened. A younger brother, Orrin, played for the Kansas City Chiefs in 1976. Merlin, Phil and Orrin were all playing in the NFL in 1976, which is one of the few times in NFL history that three brothers have ever played at the same time.

In 1973 and 1974 Olsen was moved to defensive end where he backed up Fred Dryer and Jack Youngblood. He was traded to the Broncos in 1975, where he reunited with Coach John Ralston, who had recruited him out of high school to Stanford and had coached him in the East-West Shrine Game. Olsen switched positions again, this time to center, where he played through 1976.

Olsen was the captain of the Broncos' return teams both seasons there. In 1976 Rick Upchurch had a spectacular year as a rookie kick returner. That year, the Broncos tied the then-NFL record with six kicks returned for touchdowns, with Upchurch setting the NFL mark for punt returns for a touchdown in a season with four. That same season, in addition to starting more than half the games at center, Olsen blocked four kicks (a punt, two PATs and a field goal). The Broncos beat the New York Giants 14–13 after Olsen blocked a PAT; for his efforts, he was presented with a game ball.

He moved on to the Buffalo Bills to reunite with his Ram coach Chuck Knox as one of "Knox's Guys". These were players who Chuck Knox would bring into his teams to provide leadership, skill and experience. However, Olsen subsequently suffered a third knee injury and spent his time in Buffalo on the injured reserve unit, retiring shortly afterwards.

== Personal life ==
Olsen's grandson Sam Roush plays in the NFL for the Chicago Bears.
