= Centre College =

Private liberal arts college in Danville, Kentucky, US

- Motto: Doctrina Lux Mentis (Latin)
- Motto in English: Learning is the Light of the Mind
- Type: Private liberal arts college
- Established: January 21, 1819; 207 years ago
- Religious affiliation: Presbyterian Church (USA)
- Academic affiliations: APCU; ACS; NAICU; CIC; Space-grant
- Endowment: $414.3 million (2025)
- President: Milton C. Moreland
- Undergraduates: 1,356 (fall 2023)
- Location: Danville, Kentucky, US; 37°38′44″N 84°46′45″W
- Campus: Small city 152 acres (62 ha) National Register of Historic Places
- Colors: Gold & white
- Sporting affiliations: Southern Athletic Association; NCAA Division III
- Mascot: Colonels
- Website: centre.edu

Centre College, formally Centre College of Kentucky, is a private liberal arts college in Danville, Kentucky, United States. Chartered by the Kentucky General Assembly in 1819, the college is a member of the Associated Colleges of the South and the Association of Presbyterian Colleges and Universities. It has an enrollment of about 1,400 students.

== History ==
The Kentucky General Assembly established Centre College on January 21, 1819. The college was named for its approximate location in the geographic "centre" of the Commonwealth, using early-nineteenth-century America's contemporaneous spelling of the word. The legislature placed many of Kentucky's most prominent citizens in charge of Centre College's Board of Trustees, including James G. Birney, who represented Danville in the Kentucky House of Representatives, and chairman Isaac Shelby, the Commonwealth's first governor. Classes began in the fall of 1820 in Old Centre, the first building on campus and the oldest college administration building west of the Allegheny Mountains. The students were all male, a policy that would hold until 1930, and none were African-American, which would change only in 1961.

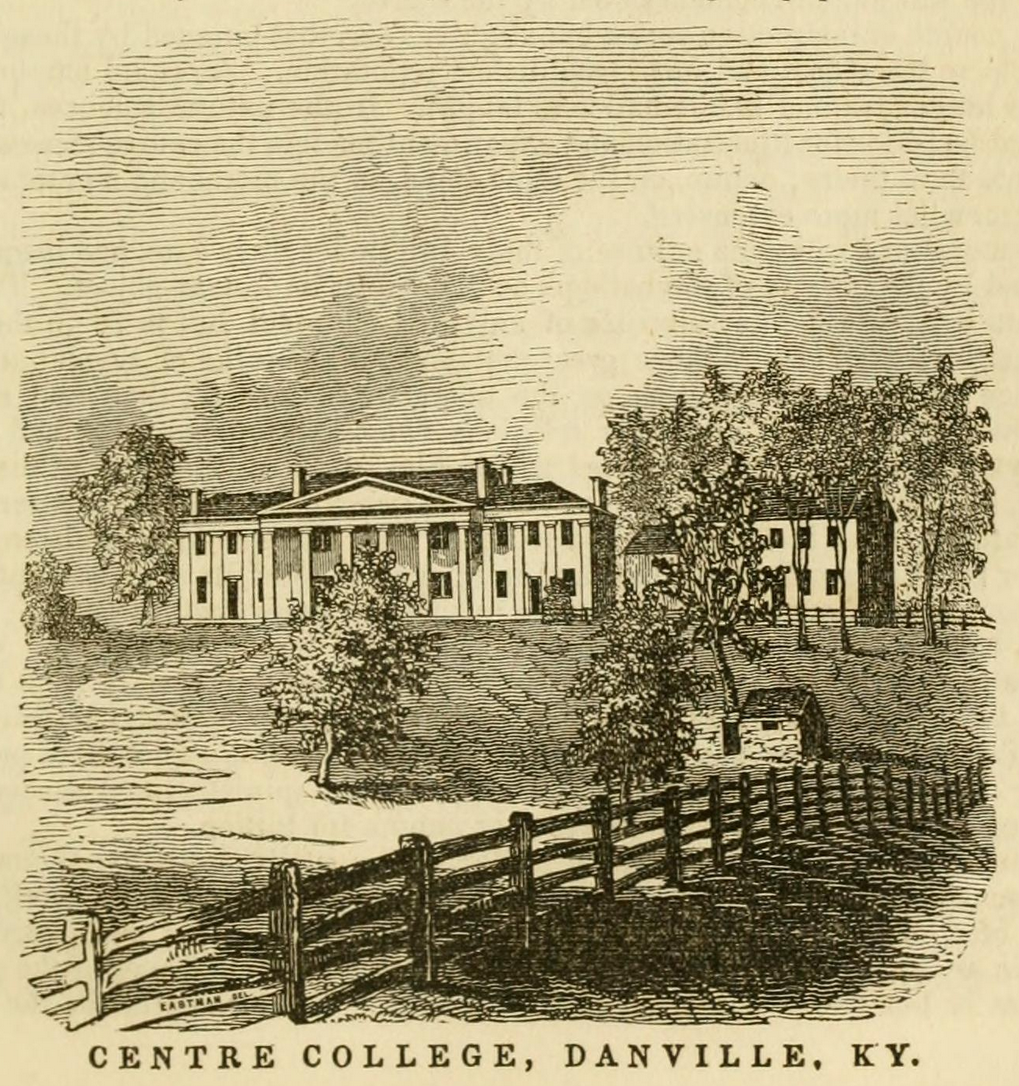
1847 engraving displaying Center College

In its early years, Centre navigated financial hardships, disputes within and outside the Presbyterian Church, and six wars, including the occupation of Old Centre by both Confederate and Union troops during the Civil War. A Centre alumnus, John Todd Stuart, played a formative role in American history by encouraging Abraham Lincoln to study for the bar, providing his first set of law books, and serving as Lincoln's professional and political mentor. In 1835, future Liberian Vice President James M. Priest applied to study theology; his application, like all those from Black people, was rejected. From 1830 to 1857, President John C. Young oversaw a vast enlargement of the faculty and a five-fold increase in the student body.

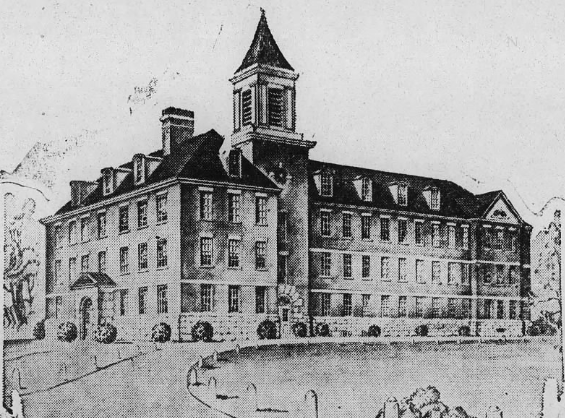
Breckinridge Hall in 1946

Following the Civil War, Centre affiliated itself with several other educational institutions. From 1894 until 1912, J. Proctor Knott, a former Kentucky governor and U.S. congressman, operated a law school at Centre as its dean. The Centre College Board of Trustees controlled the Kentucky School for the Deaf, also in Danville, during its early years; consolidated the college with the Central University in Richmond, Kentucky in 1901; from the time of the merger with Central University in 1901 until 1918 Centre College went by the name "Central University of Kentucky". It merged with Danville's Kentucky College for Women in 1930, although the women did not move onto Centre's campus until 1962.

During the 1960s the college's financial resources doubled. Eleven new buildings were added to the campus and enrollment increased from 450 to 800. In 1988, Centre set a national record when it achieved a 75.4% participation rate for alumni giving, a mark that remains unbroken to this day. From the late twentieth century to the present, strong levels of alumni giving and participation—often the highest in the nation—fueled the college's growth. Today, enrollment is around 1,300 with nearly 150 faculty members. Milton C. Moreland, who took office in 2020, is the current president, Centre's 21st. In 2000, Centre became the smallest college ever to host a national election debate. Dick Cheney and Senator Joe Lieberman debated on October 5 at Centre's Norton Center for the Arts with CNN's Bernard Shaw acting as moderator. In 2012, Centre again hosted a vice presidential debate in the Norton Center for the Arts, which featured Vice President Joe Biden and Rep. Paul Ryan.

The physical campus has changed substantially during the 21st century. In 2005, the college completed The College Centre, a $22-million project to expand and renovate Suttcliffe Hall, the Crounse Academic Center and Grace Doherty Library, which was the largest construction project on campus since the Norton Center was built in 1973. Additionally, a new student residence, Pearl Hall, was completed in 2008; a new campus center opened in October 2009; and the construction of a new science wing in Young Hall was completed in the fall of 2010. In August 2011, Centre announced the construction of Brockman Residential Commons, a 125-bed facility offering apartment and townhouse living for upperclassmen. The residence facility was completed at the beginning of the 2012–13 school year.

Classes at Centre are held in spite of several federal holidays—including Presidents, Labor, Columbus, and Veterans Days—and rarely cancelled, which are points of pride among students, staff, and alumni. During the Confederate occupation of Old Centre in 1862, classes were held at Old Sayre library. However, the Battle of Perryville eventually forced the faculty to suspend classes for 13 days, the college's only cancellation during the Civil War. Classes were cancelled one day due to the Great Blizzard of 1978. In 1994 and 1998, when severe snow and ice storms shut down much of the Commonwealth, classes were delayed by half a day. In 2000, classes were cancelled before the Vice Presidential Debate. In spring 2001, the entire campus was evacuated after a hazardous chemical spill on the train tracks at the end of Greek Row. On March 7, 2006, classes were cut short to allow students and staff to attend a symposium honoring retiring Dean John Ward. On March 15, 2020, in response to COVID-19 developments, President John Roush announced that classes would be temporarily suspended to implement an early, extended two-week Spring Break, followed by online learning for the rest of the term.

=== 2000 vice presidential debate ===
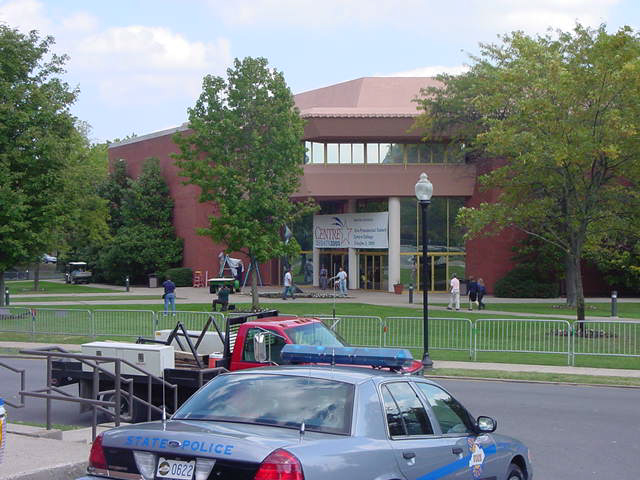
Norton Center for the Arts, the morning of the 2000 vice presidential debate between Dick Cheney and Joe Lieberman

On Thursday, October 5, 2000, Centre College hosted the vice presidential debate, becoming the smallest college in the smallest town ever to serve as a host site for a general election debate. Dubbed "The Thrill in the Ville", the debate between Dick Cheney and Joe Lieberman took place in the college's Norton Center for the Arts. The event was a tremendous success, being heralded by former CBS news anchor Dan Rather as "the best vice presidential debate ever held." After the 2000 debate concluded, Janet Brown, executive director of the Commission on Presidential Debates, said that "Centre has set the standard by which future debates will be judged."

=== 2012 vice presidential debate ===
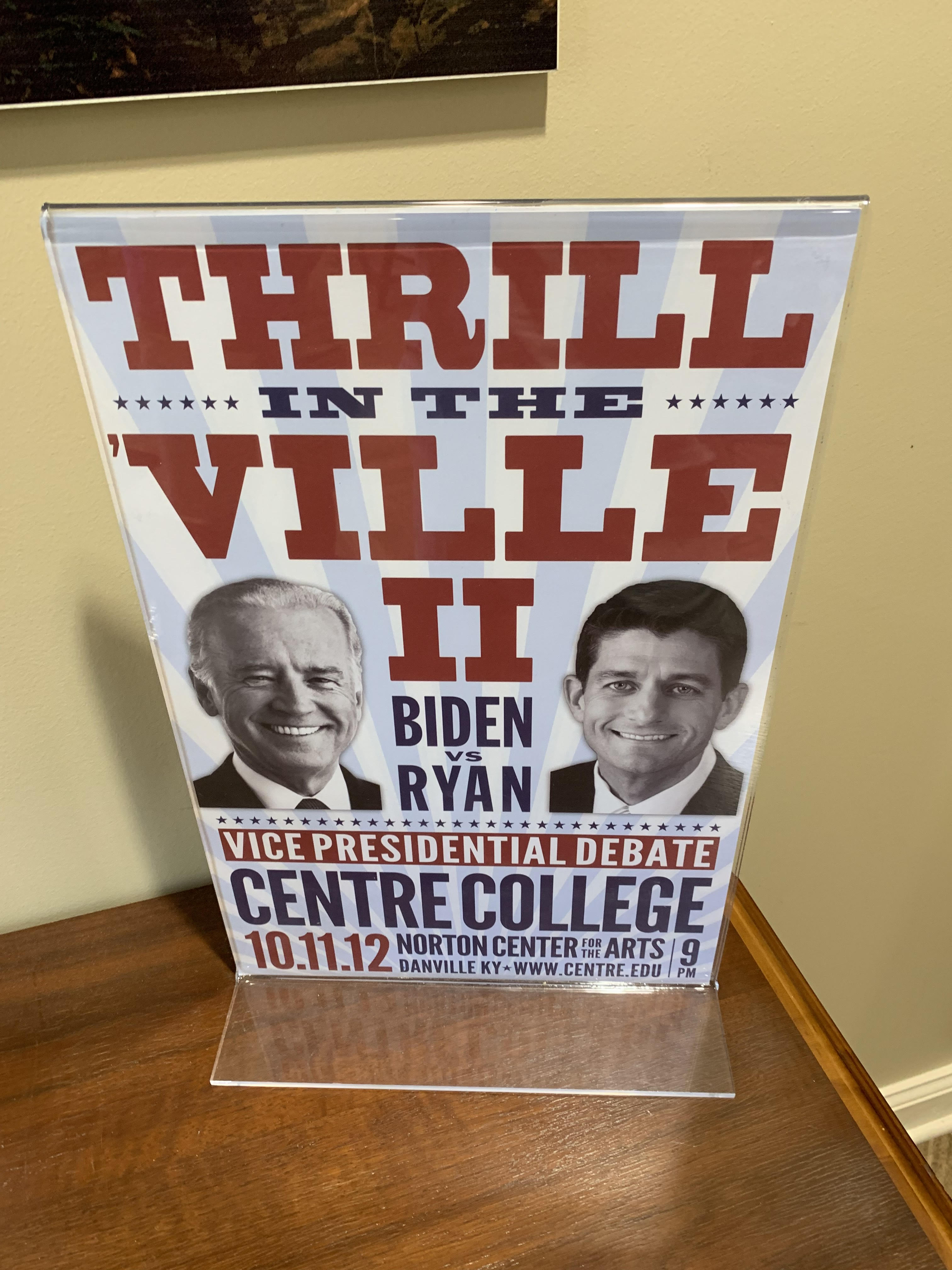
Flyer on display at Centre promoting the 2012 vice presidential debate

Twelve years after hosting its first debate, Centre College again hosted a vice presidential debate on October 11, 2012. The debate between vice presidential incumbent Joe Biden and Congressman Paul Ryan, with moderator Martha Raddatz, was called "one of the most engaging, enlightening, and entertaining debates of recent memory, one marked by dramatic contrasts in priorities, ideology, and personal style." Of Centre College's performance as a host site, Janet Brown, executive director of the Commission on Presidential Debates, said, "They aced it in 2000 and this year was even better."

=== 2018 student protest and sit-in ===
Over 200 Centre College students took part in a protest and sit-in at the campus administration building, Old Centre, on May 2, 2018. The students were protesting racial discrimination on campus. A group of black students drafted and presented a statement of intent and list of demands to the campus and school administration, demanding changes concerning the school's Department of Public Safety, Title IX office, and the creation of a Diversity and Inclusion office, among other things. Over 400 students signed a petition supporting the movement. The protesters were present all day and night in Old Centre from May 2 to 4 while student leaders negotiated with President John Roush, sleeping in the building and in tents outside; they said they refused to leave until their demands were met. The sit-in ended on May 4, with school administration agreeing to many of the student demands.

== Campus ==
Centre's 152-acre (62 ha) campus includes 67 buildings, 14 of which are included on the National Register of Historic Places.

=== Old Centre ===
- Old Centre, Centre College
- U.S. National Register of Historic Places
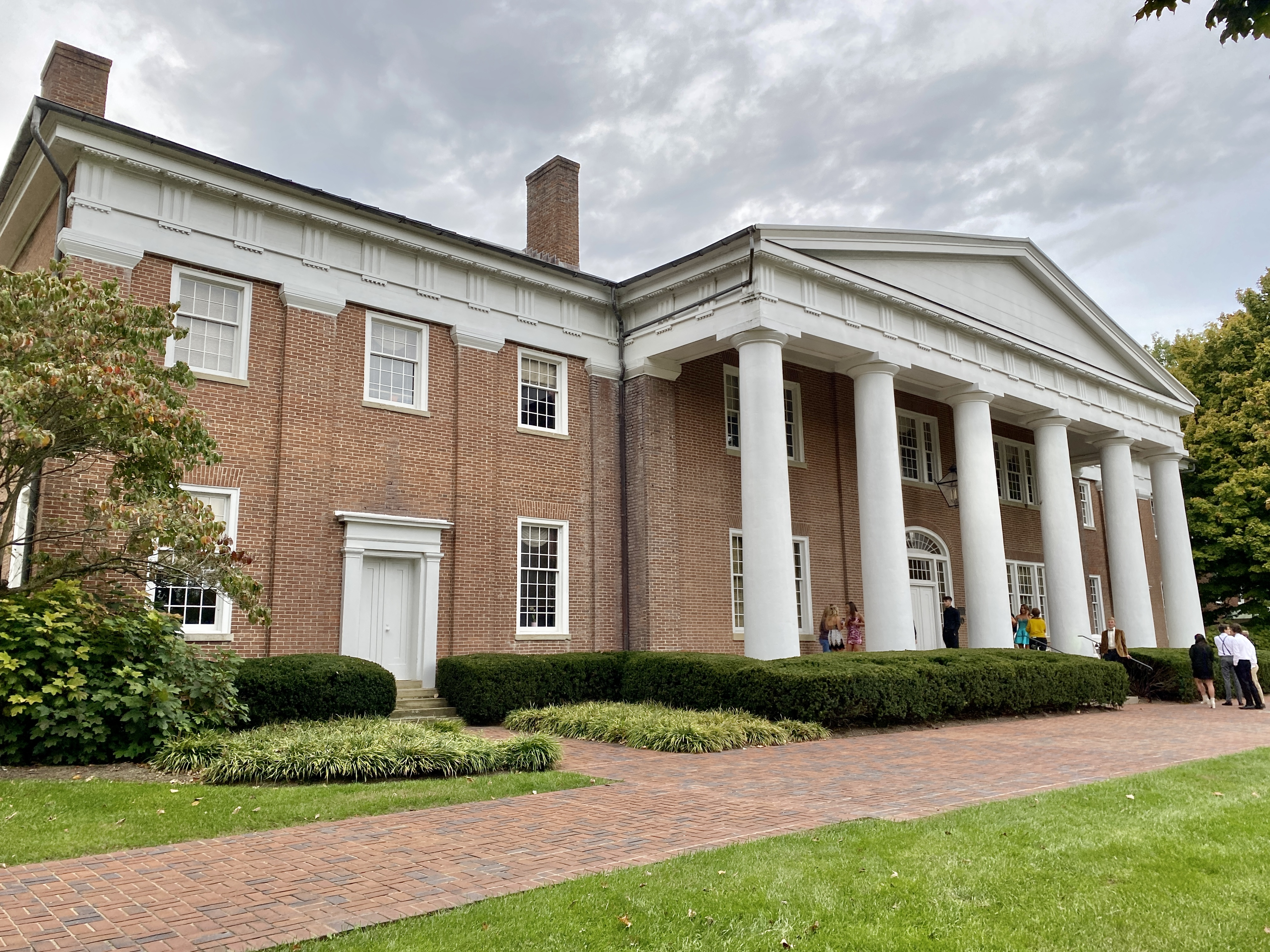
- Completed in 1820, Old Centre is the oldest continuously operated academic building west of the Alleghenies
- Location: W. Walnut St., Centre College campus, Danville, Kentucky
- Area: 3 acres (1.2 ha)
- Built: 1819
- Built by: R. D. Crutchfield, R. D. & Robert Russell
- Architectural style: Greek Revival, Georgian
- NRHP reference No.: 72000529
- Added to NRHP: August 25, 1972

Completed in 1820, Old Centre is the college's first building, the oldest continuously operated academic building west of the Alleghenies, and the template for the Greek Revival style of the campus. Today it houses the offices of the president, vice president for academic affairs, and vice president for college relations, in addition to several classrooms and the college's Admissions Welcome Centre. At various times it has served as a library, dormitory, law school, faculty residence, and, during the Civil War, a hospital for both Confederate and Union soldiers. Old Centre is a Kentucky Landmark, listed in the National Register of Historic Places, and included in the Smithsonian Guide to Historic Places.

=== Old Carnegie ===
Built in 1913 with a $30,000 grant from Andrew Carnegie, Old Carnegie was the college library until 1966. It currently houses the Center for Career & Professional Development and the Center for Global Citizenship, as well as the special-occasion Evans-Lively dining room. Old Carnegie is listed in the National Register of Historic Places.

=== Norton Center for the Arts ===
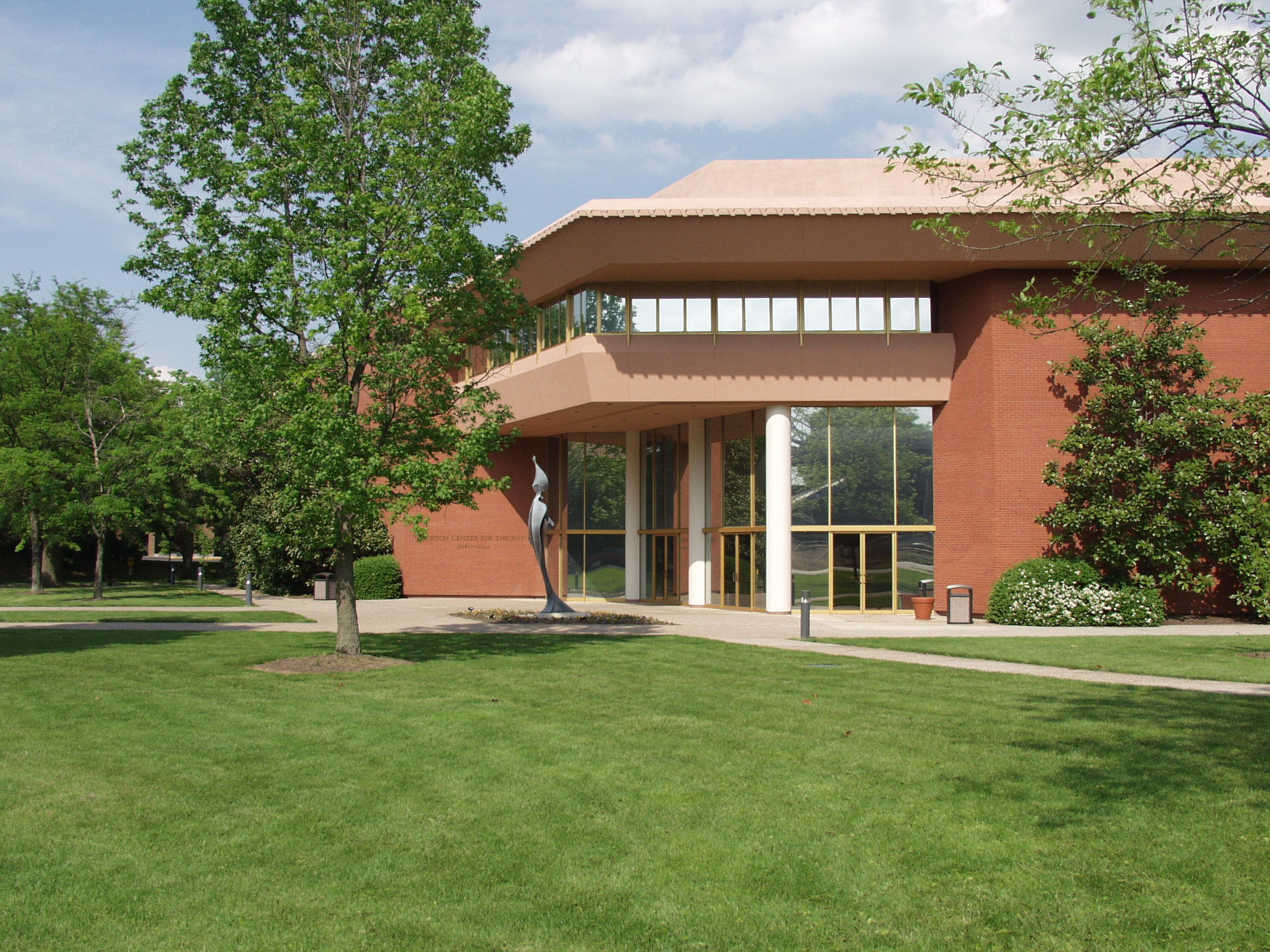
Built in 1973, the Norton Center for the Arts was designed by the Frank Lloyd Wright Foundation

Norton Center for the Arts has hosted performers such as violinist Itzhak Perlman, dancers Mikhail Baryshnikov and Twyla Tharp, the Boston Pops, the New York Philharmonic, Henry Mancini, jazz vocalists Pearl Bailey and Sarah Vaughan, the Orchestre de Paris with Daniel Barenboim, the Preservation Hall Jazz Band, Yo-Yo Ma, Beach Boys, Huey Lewis and the News, Willie Nelson, Travis Tritt, LeAnn Rimes, Lyle Lovett, Aretha Franklin, Smokey Robinson, crooner Tony Bennett, The Chieftains, Three Dog Night, David Copperfield, Dolly Parton, Nitty Gritty Dirt Band, Ben Folds, They Might Be Giants, Ana Gasteyer, Kate Flannery, and musicals such as Rent, Cats, Titanic, Annie Get Your Gun, Thoroughly Modern Millie, Hairspray, My Fair Lady and Ain't Misbehavin featuring Ruben Studdard. In October 2000, the Norton Center hosted the vice presidential debate between Dick Cheney and Senator Joe Lieberman. In September 2009, Centre garnered national attention by hosting the Vienna Philharmonic, marking the only stop on the Philharmonic's American tour other than New York's Carnegie Hall. In October 2012, the Norton Center hosted the vice presidential debate between Joe Biden and Paul Ryan. Centre students can attend most of the Norton Center events at no extra cost.

The Norton Center for the Arts was built in 1973 and originally named the Regional Arts Center (RAC). The 85,000 sq ft (7,900 m^{2}) complex was designed by architect William Wesley Peters of the Frank Lloyd Wright Foundation. It was later renamed for Jane Morton Norton, a former trustee of Centre College. The complex was refurbished in 2009.

=== College Centre ===
The College Centre is composed of two buildings, Crounse Hall and Sutcliffe Hall, both of which received multimillion-dollar expansions and renovations completed in the spring of 2005. Crounse Hall houses an enlarged library, theater, and additional classrooms; Sutcliffe Hall houses over 62,000 sq ft (5,800 m^{2}) of athletic space, including several new gymnasiums and workout facilities.

=== Old Bookstore (Stuart Hall) ===
The Old Bookstore was the first chapter house of any fraternity in Kentucky, housing the brothers of the Epsilon chapter of Beta Theta Pi. Before Centre obtained the property, the structure functioned as a funeral home and as a shoe store. The college later converted it to the Campus Bookstore. In 2005 the bookstore moved to its current downtown Danville location, leaving the building empty. In 2008, Centre rededicated the building as Stuart Hall, an upperclassmen residential facility, naming it in honor of John T. Stuart, of the class of 1826. The building now serves as the Office of Diversity and Inclusion.

=== Craik House ===
Built in 1853 and renovated in 1958, Craik House is the president's home. Originally a private residence, Henry Craik bought the home in 1937 with a bequest in honor of his Centre Class of 1890. Robert L. McLeod, the 14th president of Centre, was the first president of the college to occupy the residence. The Craik House is listed in the National Register of Historic Places.

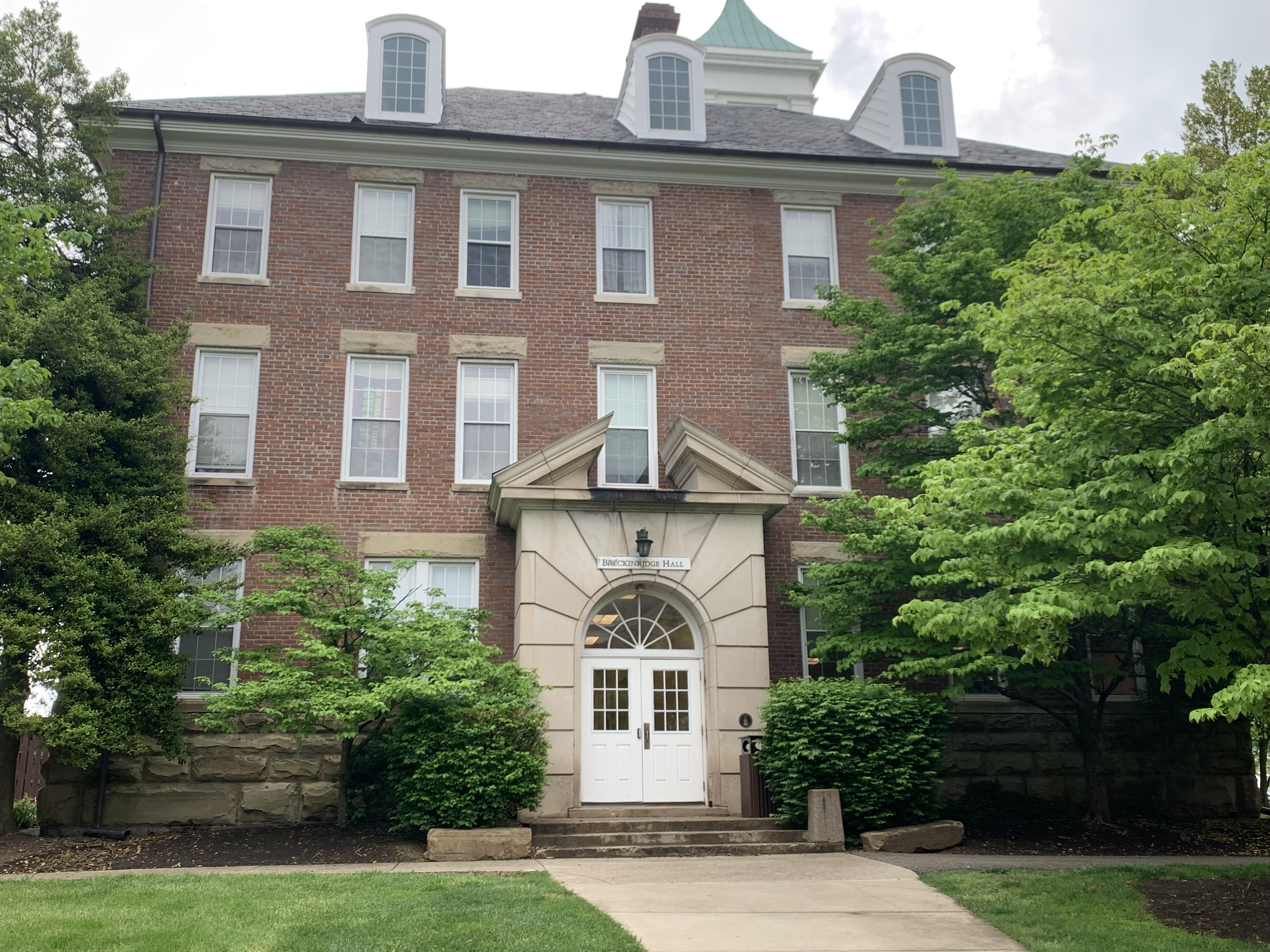
Breckinridge Hall

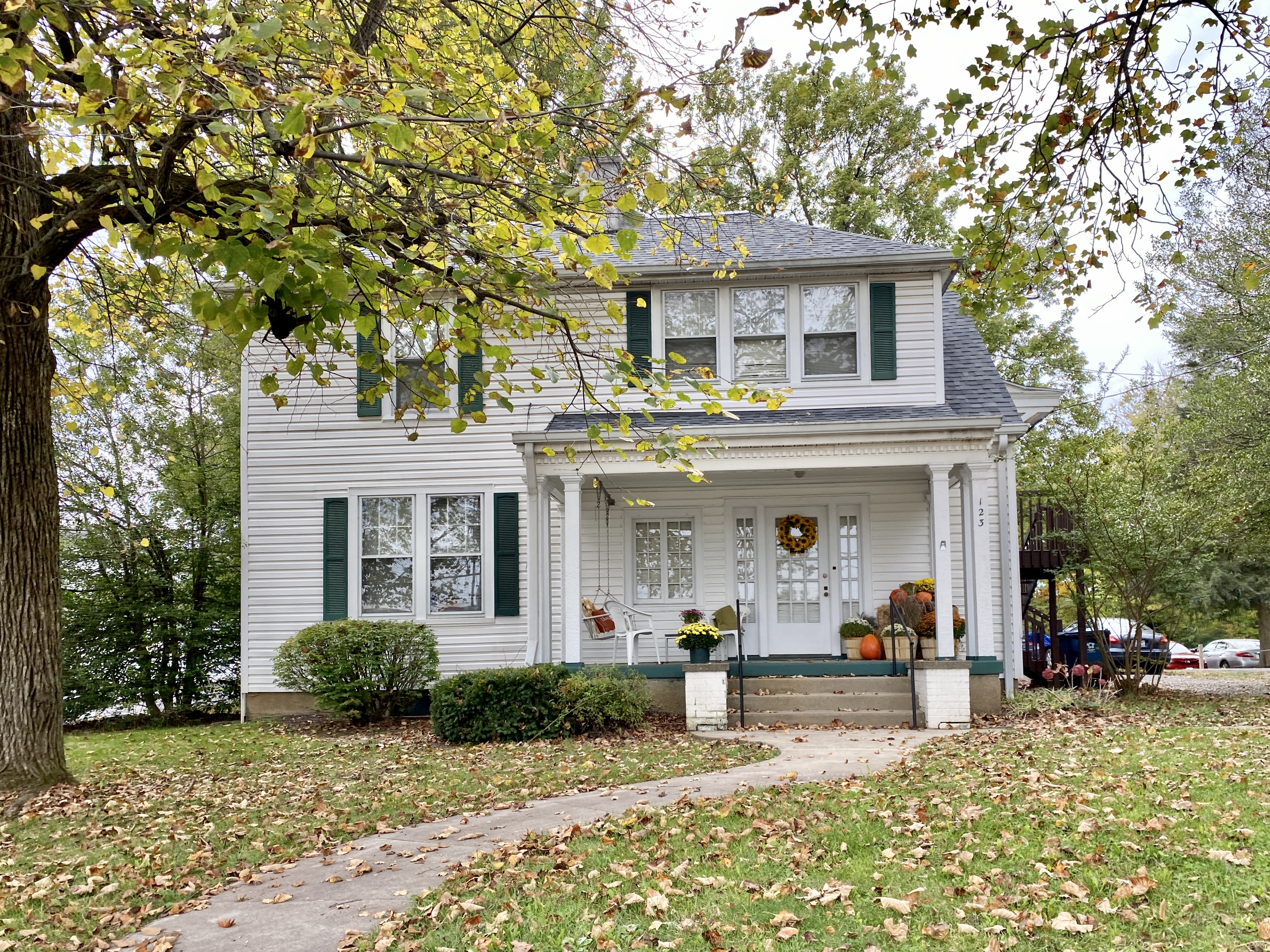
Colonial Revival-style house

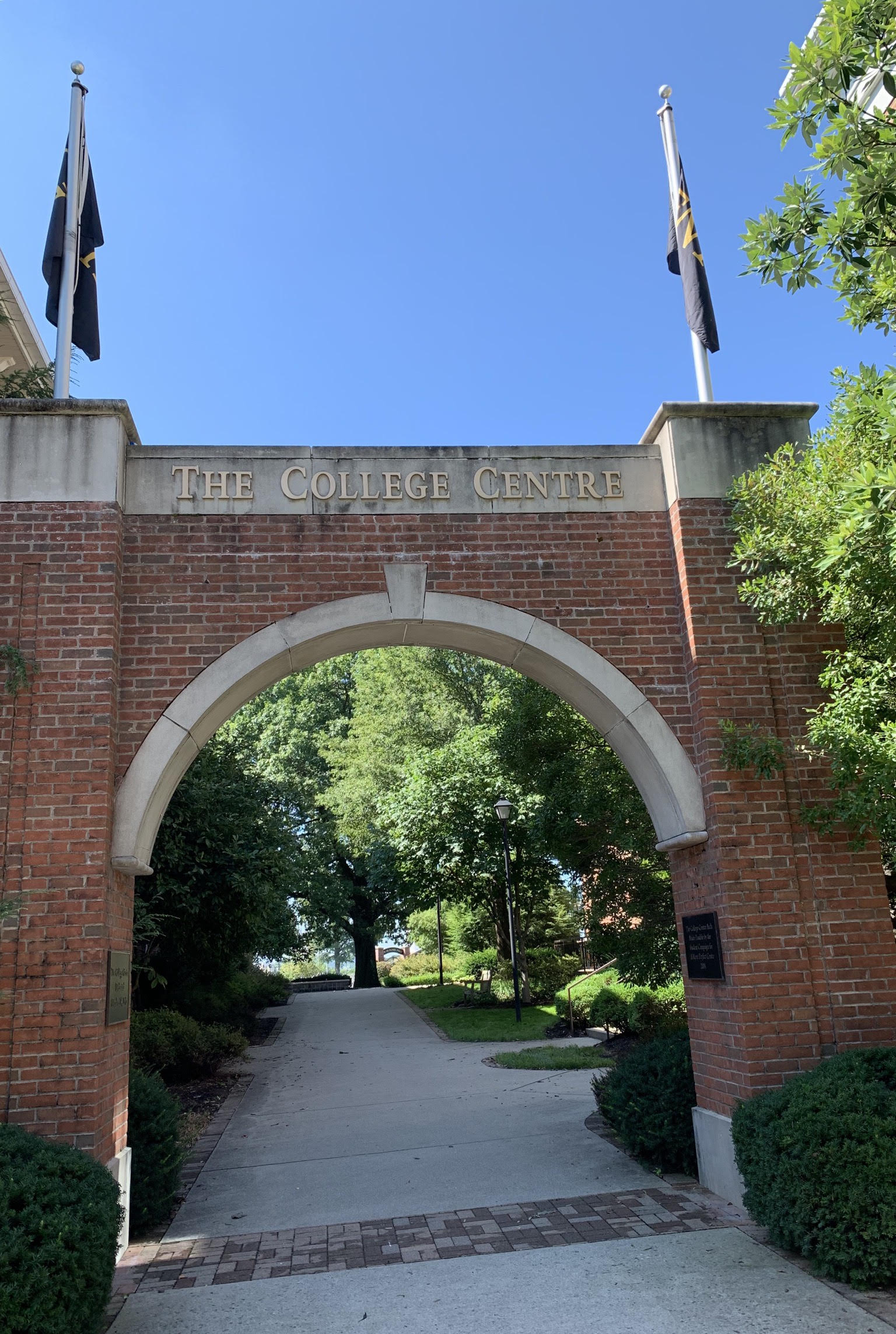
Arch at the College Centre

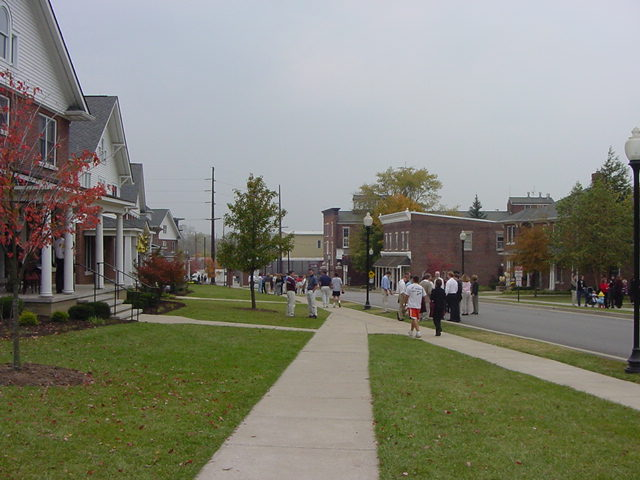
Greek housing along West Walnut Street

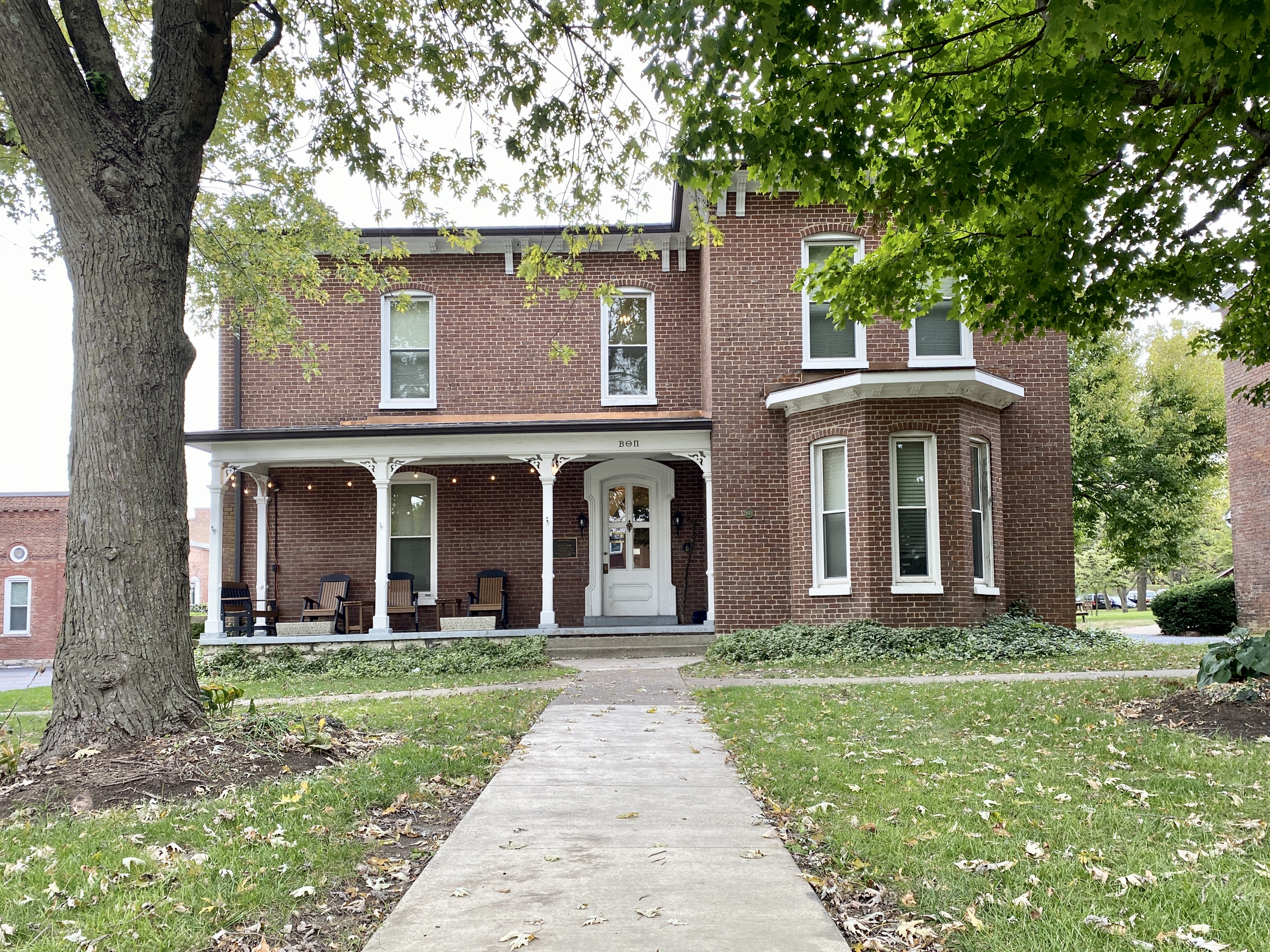
Breeze House

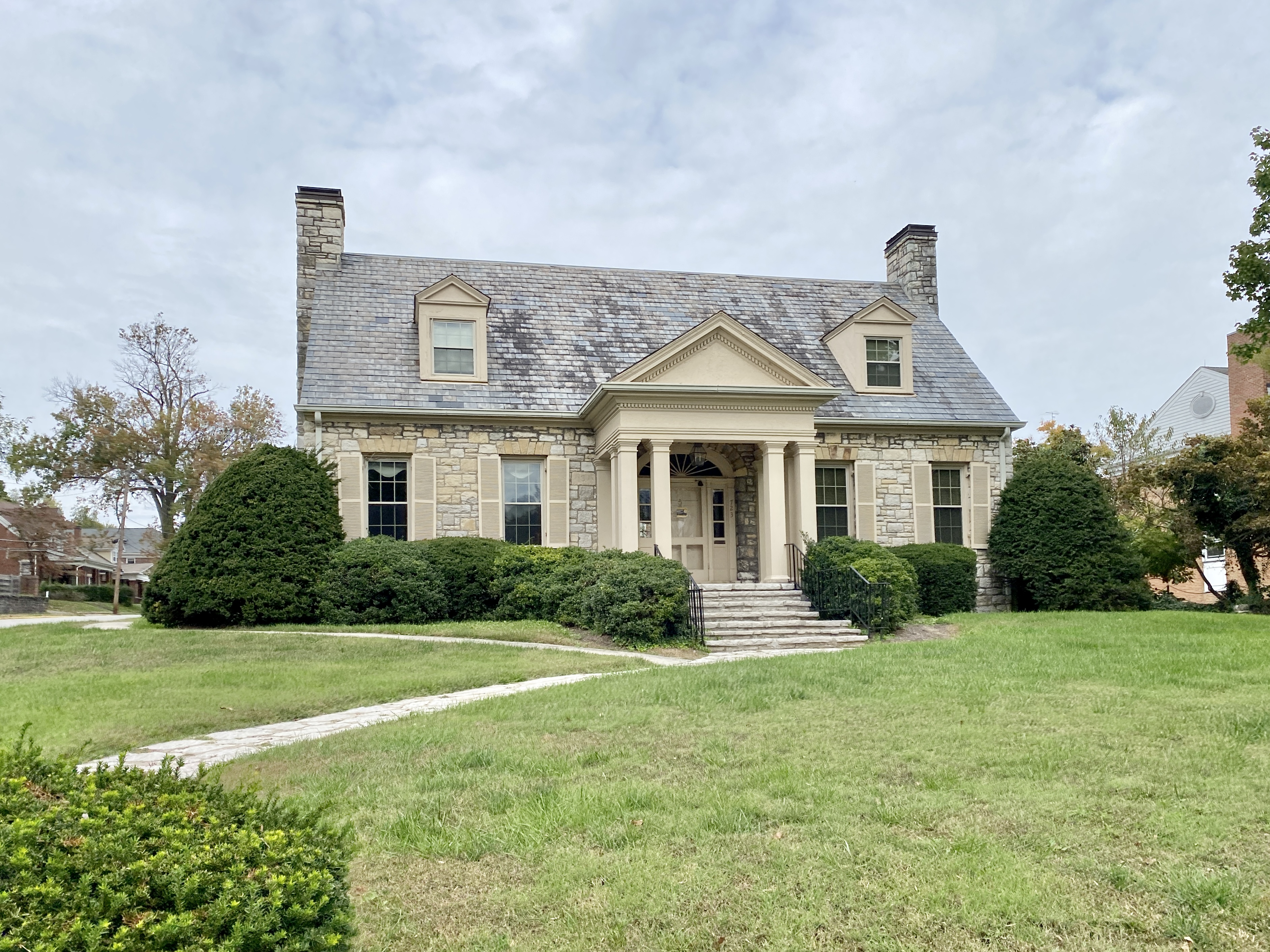
Guest Cottage

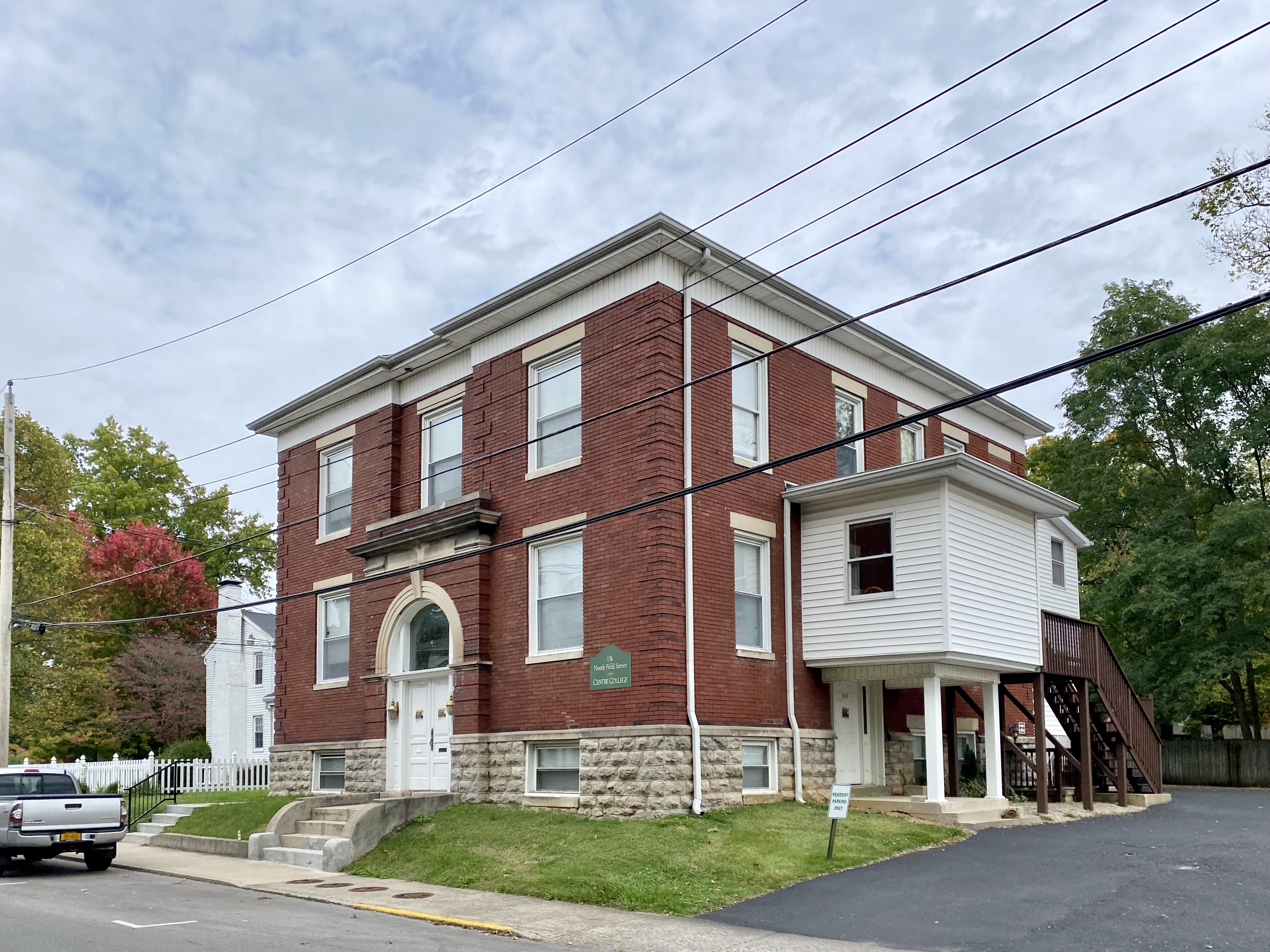
Montgomery Hospital

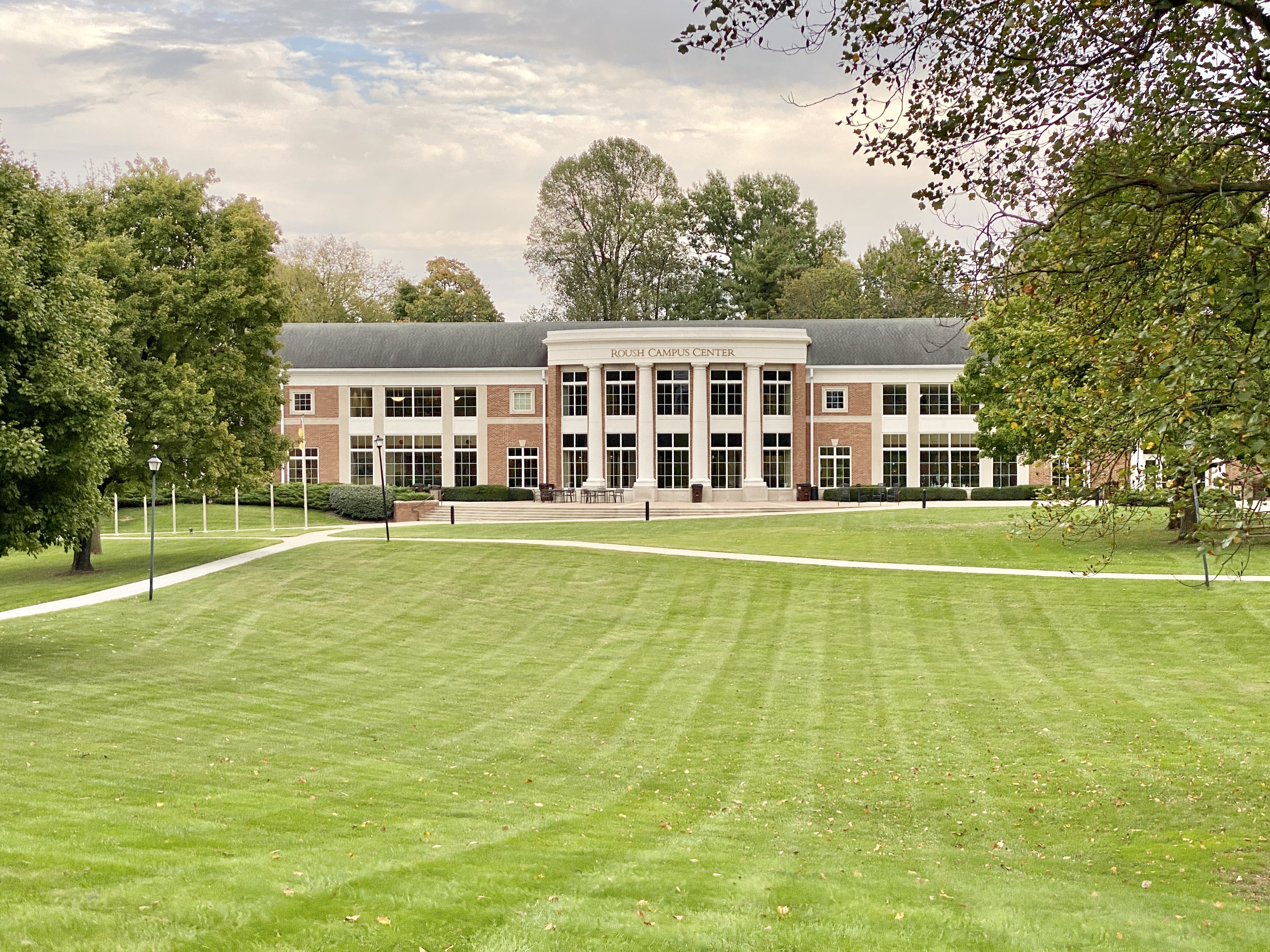
Roush Campus Center

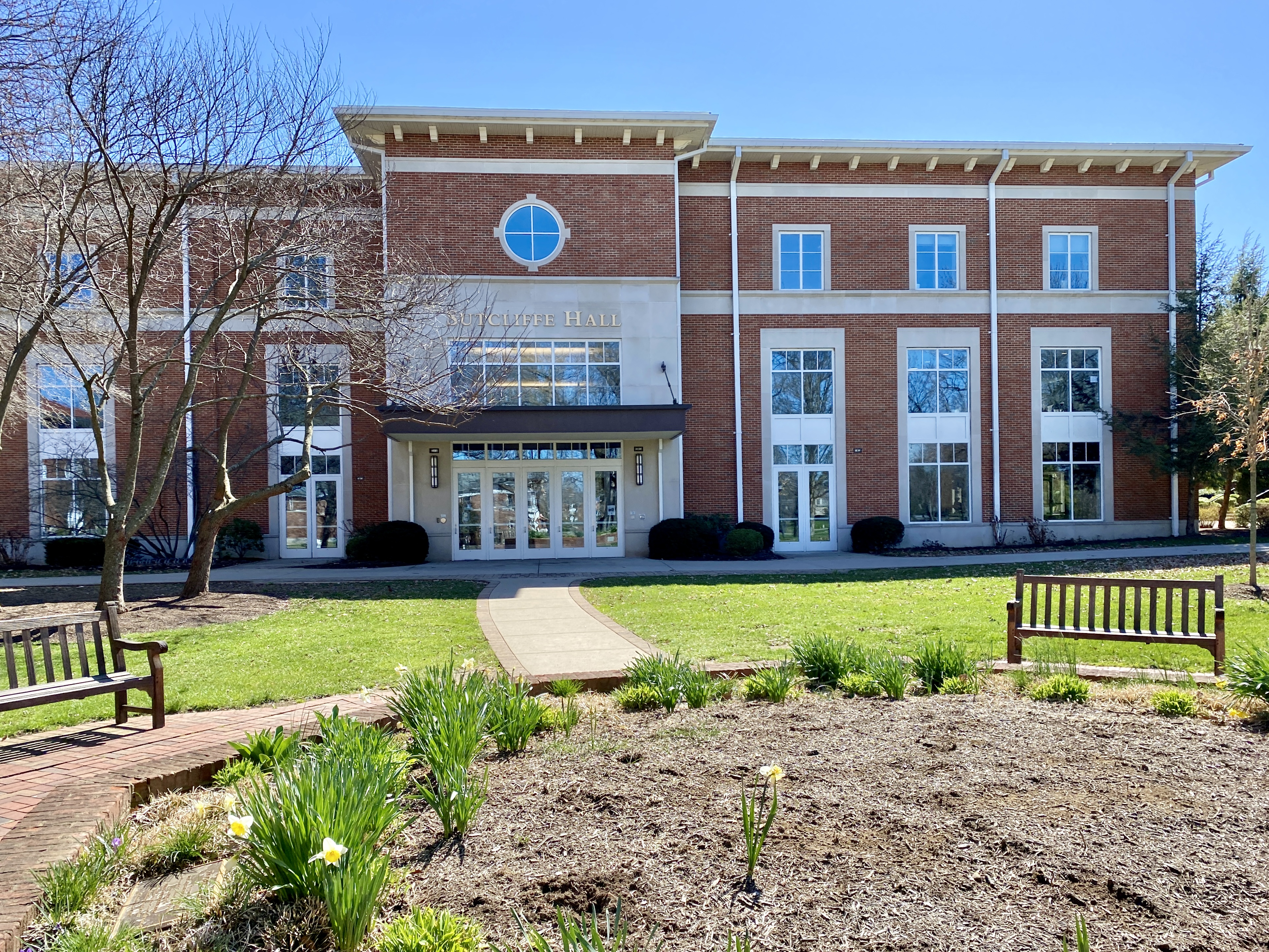
Sutcliffe Hall

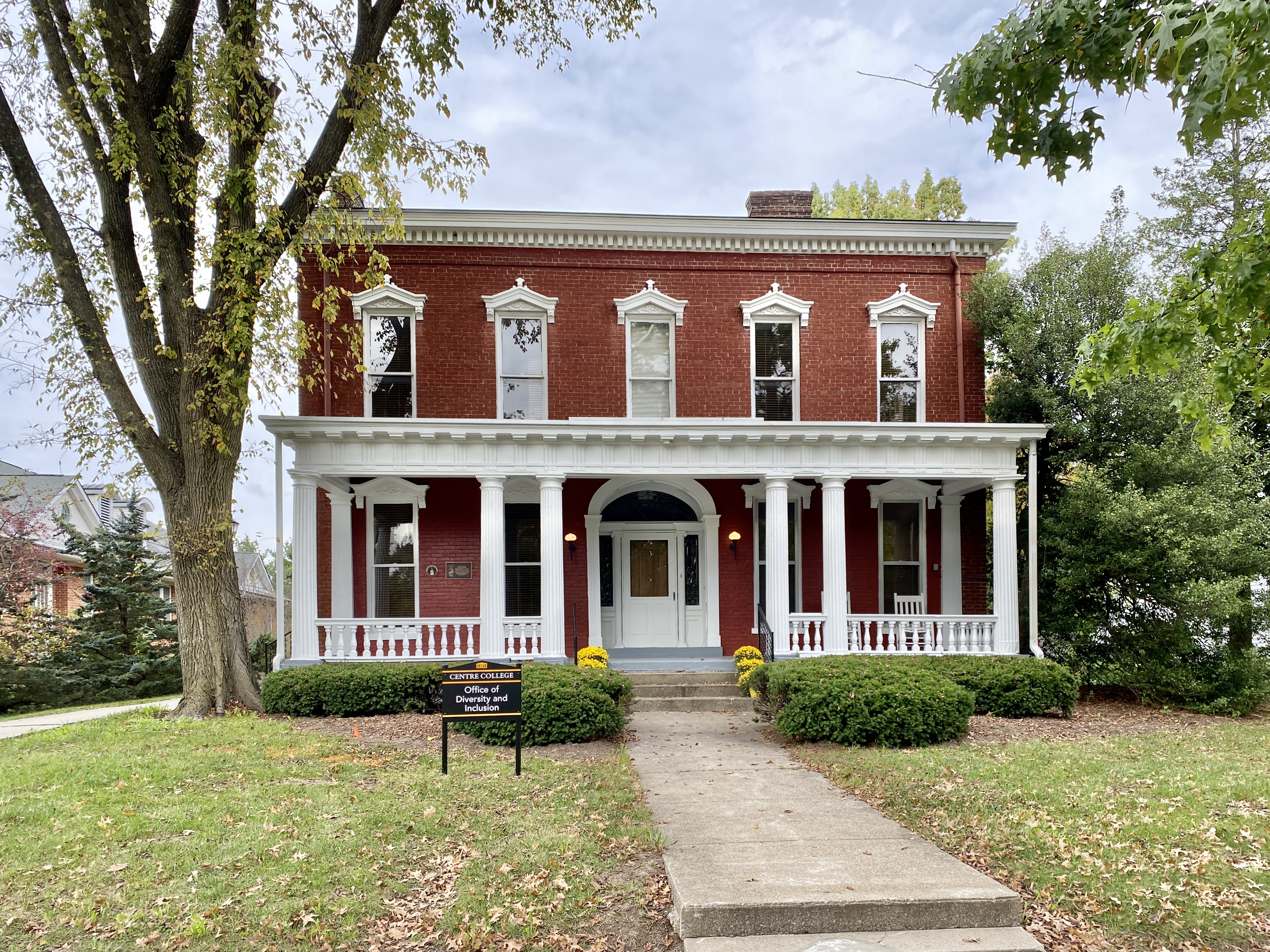
West Main Street

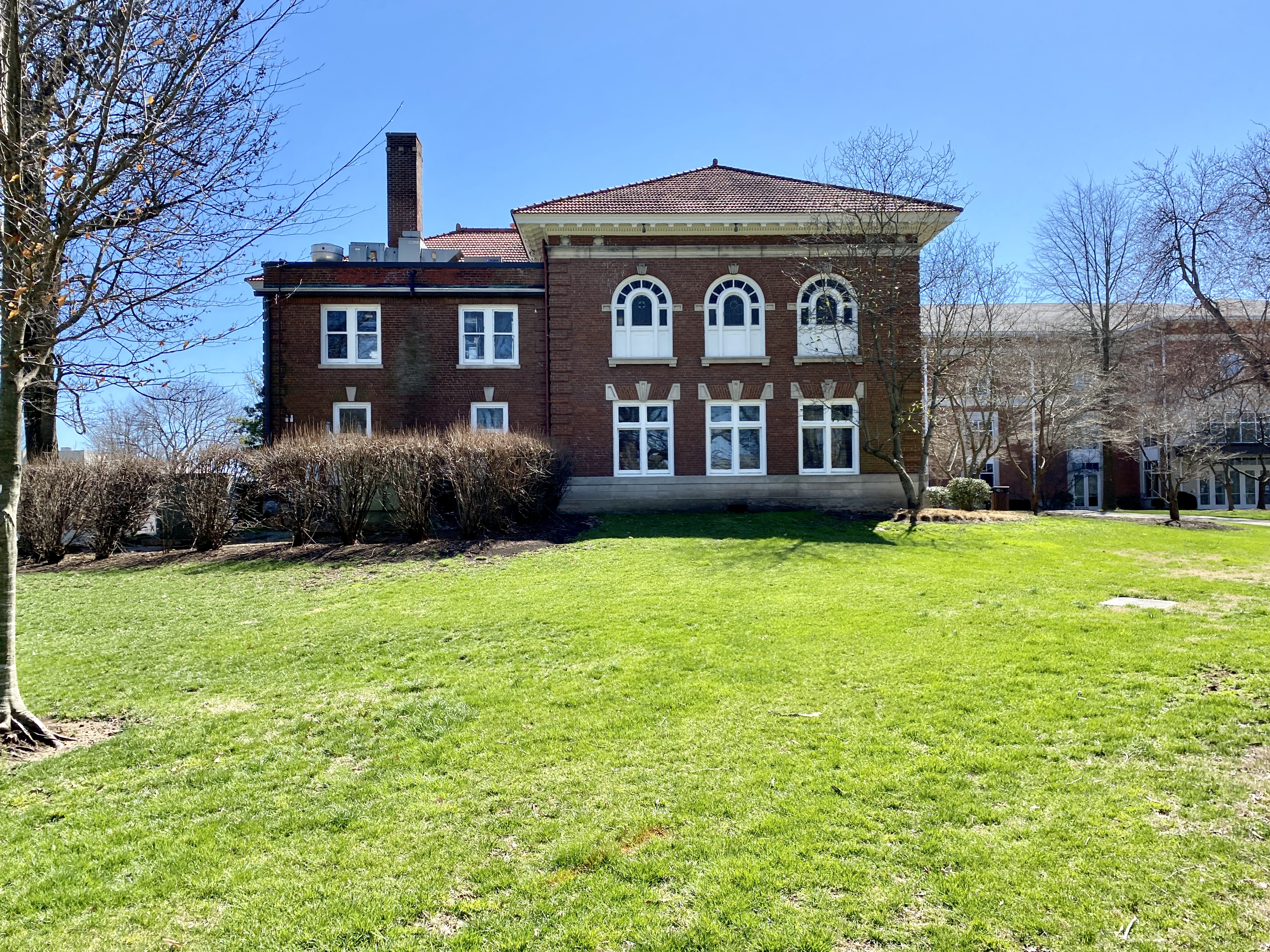
Old Carnegie

== Academics ==
Centre offers a liberal arts education, requiring the completion of a general education curriculum and a major area of study. The college hosts active chapters of Phi Beta Kappa and Omicron Delta Kappa, and has produced over 70% of Kentucky's Rhodes Scholars in the last 50 years. Centre produces Fulbright, Goldwater, Rotary, and other major fellowship winners on a consistent basis, especially relative to the small size of its student body. From 2001 to 2011 the college produced 24 Fulbright winners, six Goldwater Scholars, 11 Rotary International Ambassadorial Scholars, three National Science Foundation Graduate Research Fellows, an Udall Scholar, a Rhodes Scholar, and a Mitchell Scholar. Centre's consistent four-year graduation rate of more than 80 percent is in the top 50 nationally and the highest of any Kentucky college or university.

Admission to Centre is competitive. For the class of 2018, incoming first-years had a midrange ACT score of 26–31, with an average ACT score of 29. Fifty-four percent of incoming students ranked in the top 10 percent of their high school graduating class.

Classes operate on a 4-1-4 schedule. Students take four courses each during the fall and spring semesters and one course during CentreTerm, which is a three-week period of intensive study during January. CentreTerm offers students an opportunity to study abroad, pursue an internship, or take unique, atypical courses. For instance, "The Art of Walking", a course involving the exploration of Immanuel Kant's "Critique of Judgment" while hiking through the Central Kentucky landscape, has garnered national attention as a signature class at Centre.

=== Degrees offered ===
In addition to 29 majors and 38 minors, Centre offers double majors, which about 25% of graduates complete, self-designed majors, and dual-degree engineering programs with Columbia University, University of Kentucky, Vanderbilt University, and Washington University in St. Louis. Centre is one of only a few colleges to offer a glassblowing program through its art department.

=== Rankings and outcomes ===
Academic rankings

Liberal arts
- U.S. News & World Report: 55
- Washington Monthly: 67

National
- Forbes: 209

The 2025 edition of U.S. News & World Report ranked Centre tied for No. 59 among national liberal arts colleges. U.S. news also ranked the College No. 19 for Best Value and tied for No. 22 for Study Abroad. In 2024, Washington Monthly ranked Centre 67th among 194 liberal arts colleges in the U.S. based on its contribution to the public good, as measured by social mobility, research, and promoting public service.

In 2019, Forbes magazine ranked Centre 209th in the nation among all colleges and universities and 41st among all colleges and universities in the South. According to College Scorecard, Centre graduates earn a median salary of $60,447 ten years after their entry into the institution. 75% of Centre graduates earn higher than a typical high school graduate of the corresponding area.

In his book Colleges That Change Lives, Loren Pope says, "No university faculty compares with Centre's in the impact it has on the growth of young minds and personalities. Its faculty is earnestly committed to and excels at the art of teaching."

== Student life ==
About 96 percent of Centre's students live on campus and participate in athletics, academic organizations, student government, and volunteer work. There are about 100 clubs, societies, teams and other formal and informal groups and more than 2,000 campus events each year. In 2016 the ethnic diversity of the student body was 3.3% Asian or Asian American, 4.6% Black or African American, 2.3% Hispanic or Latino, 3% Two or more races, and 80% White.

=== Fraternities and sororities ===
Centre has an active Greek life, with the following fraternity and sorority chapters:

- Alpha Delta Pi
- Beta Theta Pi
- Delta Delta Delta
- Delta Kappa Epsilon
- Kappa Alpha Theta
- Kappa Delta
- Kappa Kappa Gamma
- Sigma Alpha Epsilon
- Sigma Chi
- Phi Delta Theta
- Phi Kappa Tau

=== Academic and leadership honorary societies ===
Centre has a variety of academic and leadership honorary societies.

=== Student government ===
The Student Government Association of Centre College (SGA) represents Centre students as their voice on academic, extracurricular, and social issues. SGA consists of an Executive Council of officers and committee chairs, a Student Senate that handles academic issues, and a House of Representatives that oversees all clubs and organizations on campus. Each class elects representatives, who serve on committees that deal with specific aspects of campus and who approve all club funding, establishment of new student organizations, and other pieces of legislation that impact campus life. Centre also has a Student Judiciary that hears cases that are referred to it by the Dean's Office or brought voluntarily by students themselves. Students who have been accused of a violation of academic or social policy have a right to have their case heard by a jury of their peers.

=== Traditions ===
==== Running the Flame ====
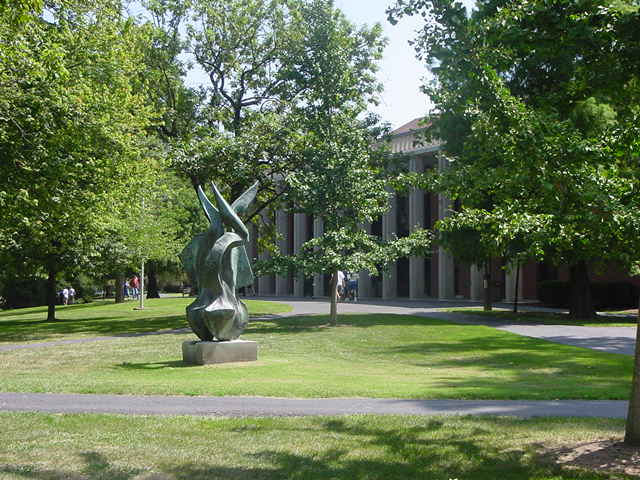
The Flame, the centerpiece of the college's most popular tradition

In 1969, Centre celebrated the college's sesquicentennial year by dedicating and installing, at the center of campus, the Flame—a large sculpture that symbolically represents the torch of knowledge that appears on Centre's official seal. A plaque at the base of the statue quotes Johann Wolfgang Von Goethe: "Where the light is brightest, the shadows are deepest." The statue quickly became an ode to the liberation of the body as well as the mind. By the early 1970s, students began spontaneously running naked to and from dorms and Greek houses while passing the Flame. "Running the Flame" is now enshrined as a tradition that most Centre students complete prior to graduation.

==== Kissing on the Seal ====
College tradition holds that two students will marry at some point following graduation if, at the stroke of midnight, they kiss over the brass college seal embedded in the walkway in front of Old Centre.

==== Dead Fred ====
A portrait of Fred M. Vinson (1909, 1911 Law), former Chief Justice of the United States, hangs in the hallway of the chapter house of the Kentucky Alpha-Delta chapter of Phi Delta Theta. Vinson was a member of the chapter and a three-sport athlete in baseball, basketball, and football while studying at Centre. Members of the chapter take the portrait, affectionately known as Dead Fred, to the sidelines of Centre football and basketball games and to other significant college events. The portrait has not missed a football home game since Vinson's death in 1953. When Centre hosted the 2000 and 2012 vice presidential debates, Dead Fred was granted a special seat overlooking the proceedings.

==== Lucky Lincoln ====
Students place pennies on the foot of Centre's Abraham Lincoln statue for good luck before exams or other important events. During the COVID-19 pandemic, Lincoln could be spotted wearing a mask.

==== Body spelling ====
When on trips away from campus, including studying abroad, groups of Centre students seek out photo opportunities in which they use their bodies to spell "CENTRE" in unique locations. In 2019, the University of Glasgow, one of Centre's overseas study partners, highlighted this tradition in the newsletter of its U.S. study program.

== Athletics ==
The Centre athletic teams are called the Colonels. The college is a member of the Division III level of the National Collegiate Athletic Association (NCAA), primarily competing in the Southern Athletic Association (SAA) since the 2012–13 academic year. The Colonels previously competed in the D-III Southern Collegiate Athletic Conference (SCAC) from 1962–63 to 2011–12; in the Kentucky Intercollegiate Athletic Conference (KIAC; now currently known as the River States Conference (RSC) since the 2016–17 school year) of the National Association of Intercollegiate Athletics (NAIA) from 1916–17 to 1961–62; and in the Southern Intercollegiate Athletic Association (SIAA) from 1910–11 to 1940–41.

Centre competes in 25 intercollegiate varsity sports: men's teams in baseball, basketball, cross country, football, golf, lacrosse, soccer, swimming & diving, tennis and track & field. Intercollegiate women's teams include basketball, cross country, field hockey, golf, lacrosse, soccer, softball, swimming & diving, tennis, track & field and volleyball; and co-ed sports include cheerleading and Esports. 40 percent of the student body participates in intercollegiate athletics. Centre offers fifteen intramural sports, in which 80 percent of the student body participates.

=== Football ===
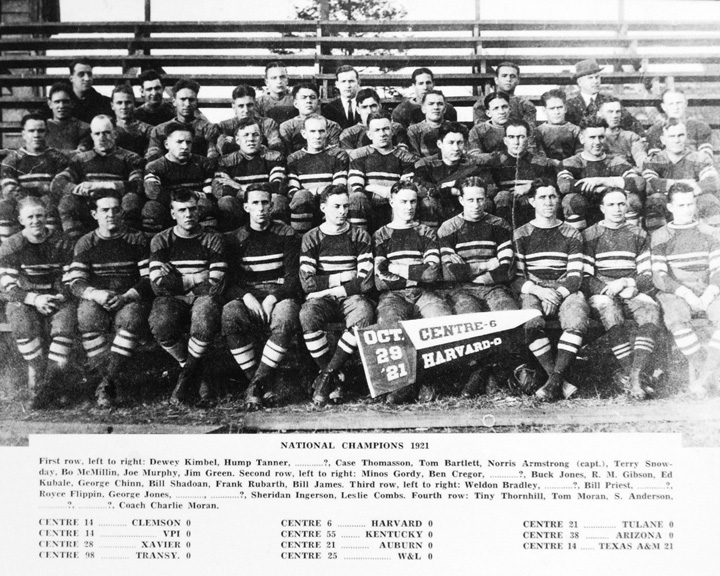
Centre College team that defeated the Harvard Crimson, 6–0, in 1921

Competing since 1880, the Centre Colonels football team, also historically known as the "Praying Colonels", ranked as the 12th winningest program in NCAA Division III history with a 509–374–37 all-time record as of 2008. The Colonels claimed the 1919 college football championship following a 9–0 season and selection by Sagarin Ratings. On January 1, 1921, the Colonels defeated Texas Christian University 63–7 in the Fort Worth Classic, a postseason college football bowl game in Fort Worth, Texas played only once. On January 2, 1922, Centre College made the postseason trip to Texas again, this time taking on Texas A&M in the Dixie Classic, the forerunner of the Cotton Bowl Classic. Even though the Colonels were outscored 22–14, they played their part in the birth of one of college football's greatest traditions, the 12th man.

From 1923 to 2022, the Colonels played their home games at Farris Stadium. Farris Stadium was demolished in 2022 to make way for their new facility, Joe McDaniel Field at Andy Frye Stadium.

=== Basketball ===
The Centre Colonels basketball team used to have a heated rivalry with Kentucky, and beat the Wildcats 87–17 in 1910.

== Notable alumni ==
Centre alumni include two U.S. Vice Presidents, one Chief Justice of the United States, one Associate Justice of the Supreme Court, 13 U.S. Senators, 43 U.S. Representatives, 10 moderators of the General Assemblies of the Presbyterian Church, and 11 governors. Referring to Centre, President Woodrow Wilson gave an annual speech to Princeton alumni in 1903 in which he stated: "There is a little college down in Kentucky which in sixty years has graduated more men who have acquired prominence and fame than has Princeton in her 150 years."
