= 1970 Los Angeles Rams season =

NFL team season

- Head coach: George Allen
- Home stadium: Los Angeles Memorial Coliseum

Results
- Record: 9–4–1
- Division place: 2nd NFC West
- Playoffs: Did not qualify

The 1970 Los Angeles Rams season was the team's 33rd year with the National Football League and the 25th season in Los Angeles. The team looked to improve on its 11–3 record from 1969. However, the Rams missed their mark by two games and finished with a respectable 9–4–1 record. Despite the winning record, the team missed the playoffs for the 2nd time in 3 seasons.

== Draft ==
1970 Los Angeles Rams draft
Round	Pick	Player	Position	College	Notes
1	22	Jack Reynolds *	LB	Tennessee	
2	35	Donnie Williams	WR	Prairie View A&M	
7	162	Ted Provost	DB	Ohio State	
7	168	Bill Nelson	DT	Oregon State	
8	204	Rich Saul *	C	Michigan State	
9	230	Dave Graham	OT	New Mexico Highlands	
10	256	Vince Opalsky	RB	Miami (FL)	
11	282	David Bookert	RB	New Mexico	
12	308	Larry Arnold	QB	Hawaii	
13	334	Melvin Jones	WR	Florida A&M	
14	360	Bob Geddes	LB	UCLA	
15	386	Dag Azam	OG	West Texas A&M	
16	412	Roland Reichardt	K	West Texas A&M	
17	437	Don Crenshaw	DB	USC	
Made roster † Pro Football Hall of Fame * Made at least one Pro Bowl during career

== Personnel ==
=== Staff / Coaches ===
1970 Los Angeles Rams staff
Front Office: Owner – Dan Reeves; General manager – Jack Teele; Coaching Staff: Head coach - George Allen; Offensive Coaches: Offensive Coordinator / Offensive Line - Ray Procshaska; Offensive Backs - Ted Marchibroda; Wide Receivers - Boyd Dowler	Defensive Coaches: Defensive Line - Lavern Torgeson; Linebackers - Tom Catlin; Special Teams Coaches: Special Teams Assistant – Marv Levy; Strength and Conditioning: None - N/A; Other Assistants: Garrett Giemont - Training Assistant

=== Roster ===
1970 Los Angeles Rams roster
Quarterbacks (QB): 18 Roman Gabriel; 10 Karl Sweetan; Running backs (RB): 33 Willie Ellison; 31 Jeff Jordan; 34 Les Josephson; 36 Larry Smith; Wide receivers (WR): 84 Jack Snow; 28 Pat Studstill P; 14 Wendell Tucker; 83 Donnie Williams; Tight ends (TE): 88 Pat Curran; 87 Billy Truax	Offensive linemen (OL): 76 Bob Brown T; 51 George Burman C; 73 Charley Cowan T; 50 Ken Iman C; 70 Mitch Johnson T; 65 Tom Mack G; 71 Joe Scibelli G; Defensive linemen (DL): 79 Coy Bacon DE; 89 Rick Cash DE; 82 Dick Evey DT; 75 Deacon Jones DE; 74 Merlin Olsen DT; 72 Diron Talbert DT	Linebackers (LB): 55 Maxie Baughan OLB; 32 Jack Pardee OLB; 52 John Pergine OLB; 66 Myron Pottios MLB; 53 Jim Purnell OLB; 54 Jack Reynolds MLB; 61 Rich Saul OLB; Defensive backs (DB): 39 Kermit Alexander CB; 23 Alvin Haymond FS; 21 Eddie Meador FS; 19 Jim Nettles CB; 17 Richie Petitbon SS; 44 Nate Shaw SS; 24 Clancy Williams CB; Special teams (ST): 27 David Ray K	Practice squad: -- Sam Adams G; -- Tommy Joe Crutcher LB; -- Bob Geddes LB; -- Bill Nelson DT; -- John Walton QB; Reserve: 80 Bob Klein TE (IR); 86 Bob Long WR (IR); 20 Tommy Mason RB (IR); -- Creston Whitaker WR (Military); 60 John Wilbur G (IR); 77 Jim Wilson T (IR); 57 Doug Woodlief LB (IR); Rookies in italics

== Regular season ==
With the completion of the AFL–NFL merger, the league was realigned into 2 conferences with 3 divisions each. The Rams were placed in the NFC Western Division with the Atlanta Falcons, New Orleans Saints, and San Francisco 49ers, none of whom had a winning record for any of the prior two seasons. The Rams, 49ers and Falcons were members of the Coastal Division of the Western Conference from 1967 to 1969, while the Saints came from the Eastern Conference, where they were in the Capitol Division in 1967 and '69 and the Century Division in 1968. Gone from the Rams' division were the Baltimore Colts, with whom the Rams battled for a division title for the past 3 seasons, shifted to the AFC East. Consequently, the Rams were heavy favorites to win what was considered the weakest of the new divisions.

As it turned out, the prognosticators did not anticipate that 49er quarterback John Brodie would have an MVP season, that the 49ers had acquired some skilled young players, and the Rams veteran roster began to show signs of aging and suffered a number of injuries. Thus, instead of battling the Colts, the Rams would stage a season long battle for the NFC West with their California archrivals.

The Rams started the season as expected, with easy wins vs. the St. Louis Cardinals 34-13, at the Buffalo Bills 19-0, and against the San Diego Chargers 37-10. The 49ers came to L.A. in week 4 with a 2–1 record, having lost at Atlanta the week before, 21-20. The Rams were prohibitive favorites, but the 49ers forced 4 turnovers and had 3 sacks to win 20-6 and gain a share of the division lead. The Rams regained the division lead the very next week with a 31–21 win in Green Bay, while the 49ers tied the Saints at San Francisco. The 49ers then won 4 games in a row, while the Rams struggled to find consistency. They lost in the mud and rain on a Monday night in Minnesota to the powerful Vikings 13-3, beat the Saints in New Orleans 30-17, needed a last second touchdown to tie the Falcons in L.A. 10-10, had 4 turnovers in an upset loss at home to the New York Jets (playing without an injured Joe Namath), then beat the Falcons in Atlanta 17-7, gaining ground after that win when the 49ers lost to the Lions in Detroit.

Week 11 was a showdown in San Francisco between the 7-2-1 49ers and the 6-3-1 Rams. The Rams played perhaps their best game of the season in winning 30-13, and were now tied with the 49ers for 1st place with three games to play. More importantly, the Rams held the tiebreaker over San Francisco due to having a better division record (4-1-1 to 3–2–1). After beating the Saints 34–16 in week 10, the 8-3-1 Rams faced the 8-4 Detroit Lions on a Monday night game in Los Angeles. The Lions won what would prove to be a pivotal game by the score of 28-23, dropping the Rams 1 game behind the 49ers and 1/2 game behind the Lions for the wild card spot. The Rams crushed the New York Giants 31–3 in New York (costing the Giants both the NFC East title and the wild card spot), then awaited the result of the 49ers and Lions games. The Lions won easily at home vs. Green Bay 20-0, and the 49ers crushed the Oakland Raiders, 38-7 (the homestanding Raiders, having already won their division and guaranteed to host their first playoff game, rested most of their regulars).

=== Schedule ===
Week	Date	Opponent	Result	Record	Venue	Attendance
1	September 18	St. Louis Cardinals	**W** 34–13	1–0	Los Angeles Memorial Coliseum	63,130
2	September 27	at Buffalo Bills	**W** 19–0	2–0	War Memorial Stadium	46,206
3	October 4	San Diego Chargers	**W** 37–10	3–0	Los Angeles Memorial Coliseum	69,564
4	October 11	**San Francisco 49ers**	**L** 6–20	3–1	Los Angeles Memorial Coliseum	77,272
5	October 18	at Green Bay Packers	**W** 31–21	4–1	Lambeau Field	56,263
6	October 26	at Minnesota Vikings	**L** 3–13	4–2	Metropolitan Stadium	47,900
7	November 1	at **New Orleans Saints**	**W** 30–17	5–2	Tulane Stadium	77,861
8	November 8	**Atlanta Falcons**	**T** 10–10	5–2–1	Los Angeles Memorial Coliseum	67,232
9	November 15	New York Jets	**L** 20–31	5–3–1	Los Angeles Memorial Coliseum	76,378
10	November 22	at **Atlanta Falcons**	**W** 17–7	6–3–1	Atlanta Stadium	58,850
11	November 29	at **San Francisco 49ers**	**W** 30–13	7–3–1	Kezar Stadium	59,602
12	December 6	**New Orleans Saints**	**W** 34–16	8–3–1	Los Angeles Memorial Coliseum	66,410
13	December 14	Detroit Lions	**L** 23–28	8–4–1	Los Angeles Memorial Coliseum	79,441
14	December 20	at New York Giants	**W** 31–3	9–4–1	Yankee Stadium	62,870
Note: Intra-division opponents are in **bold** text.

=== Game summaries ===
==== Week 1: vs. St. Louis Cardinals ====
Team	1	2	3	4	Total
Cardinals	3	0	3	7	13
• **Rams**	3	14	7	10	34

- Date: September 18
- Location: Los Angeles Memorial Coliseum, Los Angeles
- Game start: 8:00 p.m. PST
- Game weather: 63 °F (17 °C), wind 10 mph (16 km/h)
- Referee: Fred Swearingen
- Source: Pro-Football-Reference.com

Scoring summary
1	Rams	David Ray 27-yard field goal	Rams 3–0
1	Cardinals	Jim Bakken 9-yard field goal	Tie 3–3
2	Rams	Willie Ellison 3-yard pass from Roman Gabriel (David Ray kick)	Rams 10–3
2	Rams	Billy Truax 3-yard pass from Roman Gabriel (David Ray kick)	Rams 17–3
3	Rams	Alvin Haymond 98-yard kickoff return (David Ray kick)	Rams 24–3
3	Cardinals	Jim Bakken 17-yard field goal	Rams 24–6
4	Cardinals	Jackie Smith 59-yard pass from Jim Hart (Jim Bakken kick)	Rams 24–13
4	Rams	David Ray 11-yard field goal	Rams 27–13
4	Rams	Jack Snow 15-yard pass from Roman Gabriel (David Ray kick)	Rams 34–13

==== Week 2: at Buffalo Bills ====
Team	1	2	3	4	Total
• **Rams**	3	13	0	3	19
Bills	0	0	0	0	0

- Date: September 27
- Location: War Memorial Stadium, Buffalo, New York
- Game start: 1:00 p.m. EST
- Game weather: 56 °F (13 °C), wind 11 mph (18 km/h)
- Referee: Jack Reader
- Source: Pro-Football-Reference.com

Scoring summary
1	Rams	David Ray 21-yard field goal	Rams 3–0
2	Rams	David Ray 19-yard field goal	Rams 6–0
2	Rams	Willie Ellison 4-yard run (David Ray kick)	Rams 13–0
2	Rams	David Ray 46-yard field goal	Rams 16–0
4	Rams	David Ray 21-yard field goal	Rams 19–0

==== Week 14 ====
Team	1	2	3	4	Total
• Rams	7	17	7	0	31
Giants	3	0	0	0	3

- Date: December 22
- Location: Yankee Stadium
- Game start: 1:00 p.m. EST
- Referee: Jim Tunney
- TV announcers (CBS): Jack Whitaker and Frank Gifford

=== Standings ===
NFC West
	W	L	T	PCT	DIV	CONF	PF	PA	STK
San Francisco 49ers	10	3	1	.769	3–2–1	6–3–1	352	267	W3
Los Angeles Rams	9	4	1	.692	4–1–1	7–3–1	325	202	W1
Atlanta Falcons	4	8	2	.333	3–2–1	3–6–2	206	261	L1
New Orleans Saints	2	11	1	.154	0–5–1	2–8–1	172	347	L6

Note: Tie games were not officially counted in the standings until 1972.
