= 1972 Los Angeles Rams season =

NFL team 35th season

- Owner: Carroll Rosenbloom
- Head coach: Tommy Prothro
- Home stadium: Los Angeles Memorial Coliseum

Results
- Record: 6–7–1
- Division place: 3rd NFC West
- Playoffs: Did not qualify

The 1972 Los Angeles Rams season was the team's 35th year with the National Football League and the 27th season in Los Angeles. The Rams looked to improve on their 8–5–1 record from 1971 and make the playoffs for the first time since 1969. After a win against the New Orleans Saints at home, the Rams tied the Chicago Bears, 13–13, their third straight season with a tie. This was followed by an embarrassing loss to the Atlanta Falcons, 31–3. However, the Rams would then pick up their winning ways, beating the San Francisco 49ers 31–7 at home, the Philadelphia Eagles 34–3 in Philly, and the Cincinnati Bengals 15–12 at home. However, following this three-game winning streak, the Rams struggled, losing several close games, including an embarrassing 19-16 setback against the woeful Saints (the same team they drubbed 34-14 in week one), as they lost five of their last six to end the season 6–7–1.

This was the last time the Rams missed the playoffs until 1981, as they turned into a dominant team for the rest of the 70s, winning the NFC West seven consecutive times from 1973–1979 and playing in 5 NFC Championships, and appearing in Super Bowl XIV at the end of the decade. They also finished in second place in 1980.

After two seasons as head coach of the Rams, Tommy Prothro was dismissed in late January 1973 and succeeded by Chuck Knox, previously the offensive line coach of the Detroit Lions. Ironically, the Lions defeated the Rams at the Coliseum in the regular season finale.

== Offseason ==
On July 13, 1972, Robert Irsay and Willard Keland bought the Los Angeles Rams from the estate of Dan Reeves and transferred ownership to Carroll Rosenbloom, in exchange for ownership of the Baltimore Colts.

=== NFL draft ===
= Made roster
= Pro Bowler

1972 Los Angeles Rams Draft
Round	Selection	Player	Position	College
2	30	Jim Bertelsen	RB	Texas
3	70	Lawrence McCutcheon	RB	Colorado State
4	87	John Saunders	RB	Toledo
4	95	Eddie Phillips	DB	Texas
5	125	Bob Christiansen	DT	UCLA
6	151	Eddie Herbert	DT	Texas
8	199	Tom Graham	WR	Baldwin-Wallace
9	225	Harry Howard	DB	Ohio State
10	251	Jim Massey	DB	Linfield University (OR)
11	280	Albert Schmidt	RB	Pittsburg State
12	303	Dave Hoot	DB	Texas A&M
13	329	Jaime Nunez	K	Weber State
14	355	Larry Brooks	LB	Virginia State
15	381	Kenny Page	LB	Kansas
16	407	Jim Kirby	WR	Long Beach State
17	433	Luther Palmer	TE	Virginia Union
17	436	John McKean	C	Oregon

== Personnel ==
=== Staff / Coaches ===
1972 Los Angeles Rams staff
Front Office: Owner – Carroll Rosenbloom; President / General Manager – Don Klosterman; Coaching Staff: Head coach / Offensive Coordinator - Tommy Prothro; Offensive Coaches: Quarterbacks Coach - Dick Vermeil; Offensive Backfield Coach - Earnel Durden; Offensive Line - Bobb McKittrick	Defensive Coaches: Linebackers - Tom Catlin; Defensive Backs Coach - Larrye Weaver; Special Teams Coaches: None - N/A; Strength and Conditioning: None - N/A; Other Assistant Coaches: Garrett Giemont - Training Assistant; College / Pro Scott - Jack Faulkner

=== Roster ===
1972 Los Angeles Rams roster
Quarterbacks (QB): 12 Pete Beathard; 18 Roman Gabriel; Running backs (RB): 45 Jim Bertelsen; 33 Willie Ellison; 34 Les Josephson; 38 Larry Smith; 35 Bob Thomas; Wide receivers (WR): 5 Dick Gordon; 13 Lance Rentzel; 84 Jack Snow; 29 Joe Sweet; Tight ends (TE): 88 Pat Curran; 80 Bob Klein	Offensive linemen (OL): 50 Ken Iman C; 68 Mike LaHood G; 65 Tom Mack G; 61 Rich Saul C; 76 Harry Schuh T; 71 Joe Scibelli G; 75 John Williams T; Defensive linemen (DL): 79 Coy Bacon DE; 90 Larry Brooks DE; 89 Fred Dryer DE; 74 Merlin Olsen DT; 72 Phil Olsen DT; 85 Jack Youngblood DE	Linebackers (LB): 36 Ken Geddes OLB; 56 Dean Halverson OLB; 86 Marlin McKeever MLB; 52 John Pergine OLB; 53 Jim Purnell OLB; 64 Jack Reynolds MLB; 58 Isiah Robertson OLB; Defensive backs (DB): 44 Al Clark CB; 42 Dave Elmendorf SS; 21 Gene Howard CB; 19 Jim Nettles FS; 46 Roger Williams CB/S; Special teams (ST): 10 David Chapple P; 27 David Ray K	Practice squad: 60 Hank Allison G; 11 James Harris QB; 28 Ike Hill WR; 49 John Love WR; 31 Lawrence McCutcheon RB; 67 Bill Nelson DT; 62 Willie Parker G/C; Reserve: 73 Charley Cowan T (IR); 24 Clancy Williams CB (IR); 25 Travis Williams RB (IR); Rookies in italics

== Regular season ==
=== Schedule ===
Week	Date	Opponent	Result	Record	Venue	Attendance
1	September 17	**New Orleans Saints**	**W** 34–14	1–0	Los Angeles Memorial Coliseum	66,303
2	September 24	at Chicago Bears	**T** 13–13	1–0–1	Soldier Field	55,701
3	October 1	at **Atlanta Falcons**	**L** 3–31	1–1–1	Atlanta Stadium	57,122
4	October 8	**San Francisco 49ers**	**W** 31–7	2–1–1	Los Angeles Memorial Coliseum	77,382
5	October 15	at Philadelphia Eagles	**W** 34–3	3–1–1	Veterans Stadium	65,720
6	October 22	Cincinnati Bengals	**W** 15–12	4–1–1	Los Angeles Memorial Coliseum	73,385
7	October 29	at Oakland Raiders	**L** 17-45	4–2–1	Oakland–Alameda County Coliseum	54,660
8	November 5	**Atlanta Falcons**	**W** 20–7	5–2–1	Los Angeles Memorial Coliseum	75,018
9	November 12	Denver Broncos	**L** 10–16	5–3–1	Los Angeles Memorial Coliseum	65,398
10	November 19	Minnesota Vikings	**L** 41–45	5–4–1	Los Angeles Memorial Coliseum	77,982
11	November 26	at **New Orleans Saints**	**L** 16–19	5–5–1	Tulane Stadium	64,325
12	December 4	at **San Francisco 49ers**	**W** 26–16	6–5–1	Candlestick Park	61,214
13	December 10	at St. Louis Cardinals	**L** 14–24	6–6–1	Busch Memorial Stadium	36,873
14	December 17	Detroit Lions	**L** 17–34	6–7–1	Los Angeles Memorial Coliseum	71,761
Note: Intra-division opponents are in **bold** text.

=== Standings ===
NFC West
	W	L	T	PCT	DIV	CONF	PF	PA	STK
San Francisco 49ers	8	5	1	.607	3–2–1	6–4–1	353	249	W2
Atlanta Falcons	7	7	0	.500	3–3	5–5	269	274	L2
Los Angeles Rams	6	7	1	.464	4–2	5–5–1	291	286	L2
New Orleans Saints	2	11	1	.179	1–4–1	2–8–1	215	361	L3
