= 1969 Los Angeles Rams season =

NFL team season

- Head coach: George Allen
- Home stadium: Los Angeles Memorial Coliseum

Results
- Record: 11–3
- Division place: 1st Western Coastal
- Playoffs: Lost Western Conference Championship Game (at Vikings) 20–23; Won NFL Playoff Bowl (vs. Cowboys) 31–0

The 1969 Los Angeles Rams season was the team's 32nd year with the National Football League and the 24th season in Los Angeles. The Rams were led by fourth-year head coach George Allen. This season saw the Rams attempting to improve on their 10–3–1 record from 1968, in which they barely missed the playoffs by a game. The Rams improved on that record by a half-game, winning their first eleven and finishing at 11–3 to win the Coastal Division and qualify for the playoffs.

The Rams lost to the Minnesota Vikings 23–20 in the conference playoff game, then shut out the Dallas Cowboys 31–0 in the final edition of the third-place Playoff Bowl.

Two members of the Rams' coaching staff were later inducted in the Pro Football Hall of Fame: head coach Allen and special teams coach Dick Vermeil. Vermeil later won Super Bowl XXXIV with the Rams and was also the head coach of the Philadelphia Eagles and Kansas City Chiefs.

== Offseason ==
=== NFL Draft ===
1969 Los Angeles Rams draft
Round	Pick	Player	Position	College	Notes
1	8	Larry Smith	RB	Florida	
1	10	Jim Seymour	WR	Notre Dame	
1	21	Bob Klein	TE	USC	
4	99	John Zook	DE	Kansas	
6	133	A.Z. Drones	T	West Texas A&M	
7	151	Pat Curran	TE	Lakeland (WI)	
8	151	James Hakins	DB	Nebraska	
9	229	Mike Foote	LB	Oregon State	
10	255	Jerry Gordon	T	Auburn	
11	281	Dave Svendsen	FL / WR	Eastern Washington	
12	307	Tim Carr	QB	C.W. Post	
13	333	Roger Williams	DB	Grambling State	
14	359	Ray Stephens	RB	Minnesota	
15	385	George Jugum	LB	Washington	
16	411	Henry Hipps	LB	Washington	
17	437	Jim Thorpe	\DB	Hofstra	
Made roster † Pro Football Hall of Fame * Made at least one Pro Bowl during career

== Personnel ==
=== Staff / Coaches ===
1969 Los Angeles Rams staff
Front Office: Owner – Dan Reeves; General manager – Jack Teele; Coaching Staff: Head coach - George Allen; Offensive Coaches: Offensive Coordinator / Offensive Line - Ray Procshaska; Offensive Backs - Ted Marchibroda; Receivers - Howard Schnellenberger	Defensive Coaches: Defensive Line - Lavern Torgeson; Linebackers - Tom Catlin; Special Teams Coaches: Special Teams Assistant – Dick Vermeil; Strength and Conditioning: None - N/A

=== Roster ===
1969 Los Angeles Rams roster
Quarterbacks (QB): 18 Roman Gabriel; 10 Karl Sweetan; Running backs (RB): 33 Willie Ellison; 31 Jeff Jordan; 34 Les Josephson; 39 Izzy Lang; 20 Tommy Mason; 36 Larry Smith; Wide receivers (WR): 84 Jack Snow; 28 Pat Studstill P; 14 Wendell Tucker; Tight ends (TE): 88 Pat Curran; 80 Bob Klein; 87 Billy Truax	Offensive linemen (OL): 76 Bob Brown T; 51 George Burman C/G; 73 Charley Cowan T; 50 Ken Iman C; 70 Mitch Johnson T; 64 Mike LaHood G; 65 Tom Mack G; Defensive linemen (DL): 79 Coy Bacon DT; 78 Roger Brown DT; 89 Rick Cash DE; 75 Deacon Jones DE; 85 Lamar Lundy DE; 74 Merlin Olsen DT; 72 Diron Talbert DE	Linebackers (LB): 55 Maxie Baughan OLB; 32 Jack Pardee OLB; 52 John Pergine OLB; 66 Myron Pottios MLB; 53 Jim Purnell OLB; 57 Doug Woodlief MLB; Defensive backs (DB): 46 Willie Daniel CB; 23 Alvin Haymond FS; 21 Eddie Meador FS; 19 Jim Nettles CB; 17 Richie Petitbon SS; 44 Nate Shaw SS; 41 Ron Smith CB/SS; 24 Clancy Williams CB; Special teams (ST): 30 Bruce Gossett K; 27 David Ray K	Reserve: 22 Dick Bass RB (IR); 43 Mike Dennis RB (IR); -- Dean Halverson LB (Military); 56 Frank Marchlewski C (IR); 71 Joe Scibelli G (IR); -- Jim Seymour WR (Military); 77 Jim Wilson T (IR); Rookies in italics

== Regular season ==
- In 1969, the Rams opened the season with an 11-game winning streak, still a team record, before losing 4 straight at the end of the year. Roman Gabriel threw 24 touchdowns and only 7 interceptions and was named the NFL's Most Valuable Player by the AP and NEA and the Player of the Year by the UPI and he was voted All-Pro and to the Pro Bowl.
- The Los Angeles Rams would not start a season 8-0 again for nearly 50 years, with their next 8-0 start (whether it be in Los Angeles or St. Louis as the St. Louis Rams) coming during the 2018 Los Angeles Rams season.

=== Summary ===
In 1967 and 1968, the Rams and Colts waged season long battles for the Coastal Division title, with the Rams winning on the season's final day in 1967 and the Colts clinching on the next to last week of the season in 1968. 1969 was expected to be no different, thus the opening game in Baltimore vs. the Colts would be a big one. The Colts were coming off a 13–1 season in 1968, but had been upset in Super Bowl III by the New York Jets.

In the opener in Baltimore, the Rams, aided by four Colts' turnovers, came back from a 20–17 deficit to win 27–20 and immediately get the upper hand in the division race. Week after week, the Rams continued to win, although they got a scare in a 27–21 week 4 win in San Francisco and a 9–7 week 6 win in Chicago vs. the Bears. After 8 weeks the Rams were 8–0–0. Meanwhile, the Colts, affected by age and injuries, were 5–3, including a 52–14 loss in week 2 vs. Minnesota. In week 9, the Rams survived a comeback attempt by the Eagles in a 23–17 win, while the Colts lost for the 2nd time in the season to the San Francisco 49ers (who won only 4 games all year).

Week 10 featured a showdown between the 9–0 Rams and the 8–1 Dallas Cowboys. The Rams won a thriller 24–23, aided in part by a Bob Hayes fumble while he was running untouched in the clear and seemingly headed for a touchdown (the Cowboys recovered but had to settle for a field goal). The following week the Rams clinched the division title with a 24–13 win in Washington vs. the Redskins. With 3 games left, the Rams were 11–0 and the Colts were 7–4. Week 12 was another showdown, this time between the 11–0 Rams and the 10–1 Vikings, who had lost their opener and then won 10 straight (and, like the Rams, already had clinched their division). The Rams dream of an undefeated season was dashed in a 20–13 loss to Minnesota, in a game that was not as close as the score indicated. Coach George Allen decided to rest a lot of his older veterans in weeks 13 and 14 (back then home field advantage in the playoffs was rotated and not determined by best record, so the Rams knew they would open the playoffs in Minnesota regardless of their record) and the Rams lost in a Detroit snowstorm to the Lions, 28–0, and then they dropped a 13–7 game to the Colts in the final game.

=== Playoffs ===
The Rams ventured into a cold weather venue (Bloomington, Minnesota) just as they had in 1967 when they dropped a 28–7 game to the Packers in Milwaukee. This time they faced the 12–2 Vikings who had beaten the Rams in L.A. in week 12. But the Rams started off well and led 17–7 at halftime. However, they were stopped inside the 5-yard line and had to settle for a field goal; otherwise the lead would have been 21–7. The Vikings cut the lead to 17–14 but the Rams mounted a responding drive of their own but again were stopped inside the 5-yard line and had to settle for a field goal to lead 20–14. Led by the passing and running of Joe Kapp, the Vikings took the lead 21–20, and then sacked Gabriel in the end zone for a safety and a 23–20 lead late in the 4th quarter. The Rams forced a Viking punt and began to March down field in the final minute when Gabriel was intercepted near midfield, ensuring the Vikings win.

=== Schedule ===
Week	Date	Opponent	Result	Record	Venue	Attendance
1	September 21	at **Baltimore Colts**	**W** 27–20	1–0	Memorial Stadium	56,864
2	September 28	**Atlanta Falcons**	**W** 17–7	2–0	Los Angeles Memorial Coliseum	58,031
3	October 5	New Orleans Saints	**W** 36–17	3–0	Los Angeles Memorial Coliseum	54,879
4	October 12	at **San Francisco 49ers**	**W** 27–21	4–0	Kezar Stadium	45,995
5	October 19	Green Bay Packers	**W** 34–21	5–0	Los Angeles Memorial Coliseum	78,947
6	October 26	at Chicago Bears	**W** 9–7	6–0	Wrigley Field	45,985
7	November 2	at **Atlanta Falcons**	**W** 38–6	7–0	Atlanta Stadium	54,357
8	November 9	**San Francisco 49ers**	**W** 41–30	8–0	Los Angeles Memorial Coliseum	73,975
9	November 16	at Philadelphia Eagles	**W** 23–17	9–0	Franklin Field	60,658
10	November 23	Dallas Cowboys	**W** 24–23	10–0	Los Angeles Memorial Coliseum	79,105
11	November 30	at Washington Redskins	**W** 24–13	11–0	RFK Stadium	50,352
12	December 7	Minnesota Vikings	**L** 13–20	11–1	Los Angeles Memorial Coliseum	80,430
13	December 14	at Detroit Lions	**L** 0–28	11–2	Tiger Stadium	53,256
14	December 21	**Baltimore Colts**	**L** 7–13	11–3	Los Angeles Memorial Coliseum	73,326
Note: Intra-division opponents are in **bold** text.

=== Playoffs ===
Round	Date	Opponent	Result	Record	Venue	Attendance
Western Conference	December 27	at Minnesota Vikings	**L** 20–23	0–1	Metropolitan Stadium	47,900
Playoff Bowl	January 3, 1970	Dallas Cowboys	**W** 31–0	1–1	Miami Orange Bowl	31,151

== Standings ==
NFL Coastal
	W	L	T	PCT	DIV	CONF	PF	PA	STK
Los Angeles Rams	11	3	0	.786	5–1	7–3	320	243	L3
Baltimore Colts	8	5	1	.615	3–3	5–4–1	279	268	W1
Atlanta Falcons	6	8	0	.429	2–4	4–6	276	268	W3
San Francisco 49ers	4	8	2	.333	2–4	3–7	277	319	W1

Note: Tie games were not officially counted in the standings until 1972.

== Season summary ==
=== Week 1 at Colts ===
Week One: Los Angeles Rams (0–0) at Baltimore Colts (0–0)

Quarter	1	2	3	4	Total
Rams	3	7	10	7	27
Colts	0	10	7	3	20

at Memorial Stadium, Baltimore, Maryland

- Date: September 21
- Game weather: 63 °F (17 °C)
- Game attendance: 56,864
- Box Score

Game information

First quarter

- LA – Bruce Gossett 29-yard field goal. Rams 3–0. Drive:

Second quarter

- BAL – Tom Mitchell 13-yard pass from Johnny Unitas (Lou Michaels kick). Colts 7–3. Drive:
- LA – Billy Truax 4-yard pass from Roman Gabriel (Bruce Gossett kick). Rams 10–7. Drive:
- BAL – Lou Michaels 15-yard field goal. Tie 10–10. Drive:

Third quarter

- BAL – Jimmy Orr 41-yard pass from Johnny Unitas (Lou Michaels kick). Colts 17–10. Drive:
- LA – Willie Ellison 14-yard pass from Roman Gabriel (Bruce Gossett kick). Tie 17–17. Drive:
- LA – Bruce Gossett 15-yard field goal. Rams 20–17. Drive:

Fourth quarter

- LA – Wendell Tucker 16-yard pass from Roman Gabriel (Bruce Gossett kick). Rams 27–17. Drive:
- BAL – Lou Michaels 41-yard field goal. Rams 27–20. Drive:

Top passers

- LA – Roman Gabriel – 20/33, 268 yards, 3 TD
- BAL – Johnny Unitas – 20/42, 297 yards, 2 TD, 3 INT

Top rushers

- LA – Larry Smith – 10 rushes, 73 yards
- BAL – Preston Pearson – 11 rushes, 43 yards

Top receivers

- LA – Wendell Tucker – 6 receptions, 90 yards, TD
- BAL – Jimmy Orr – 5 receptions, 87 yards, TD

== Awards and records ==
- Roman Gabriel, NFL MVP
- Roman Gabriel, Bert Bell Award

=== Pro Bowl Honorees ===
- Roman Gabriel, Quarterback
- Deacon Jones, Defensive End
- Merlin Olsen, Defensive Tackle
- Charley Cowan, Offensive Tackle
- Tom Mack, Offensive Guard
- Bob Brown, Offensive Tackle
- Maxie Baughan, Linebacker
- Ed Meador, Safety
