= 1969 Baltimore Colts season =

17th season in franchise history

- Owner: Carroll Rosenbloom
- General manager: Harry Hulmes
- Head coach: Don Shula
- Home stadium: Memorial Stadium

Results
- Record: 8–5–1
- Division place: 2nd Coastal
- Playoffs: Did not qualify

The 1969 Baltimore Colts season was the 17th season for the team in the National Football League. The Colts finished the National Football League's 1969 season with a record of 8 wins, 5 losses and 1 tie. Led by seventh-year head coach Don Shula, Baltimore finished second in the Western Conference's Coastal division, well behind the Los Angeles Rams (11–3).

Many attributed the disappointing season to the hangover of losing to the heavy-underdog New York Jets in Super Bowl III in January 1969. It is one of the first instances of a Super Bowl hangover – in which the team that played in a Super Bowl the previous season underperforms in the next season.

A disappointing 20–17 loss to the San Francisco 49ers in week 9 dropped the Colts to a 5–4 record and put the Colts four full games behind the unbeaten Los Angeles Rams in the division. After the defeat head coach Shula declared, "It looks like we are out of it. I'm disappointed that we went without giving them [the Rams] a battle for it."

In February 1970, two months after the season, Shula departed for the Miami Dolphins.

== NFL/AFL draft ==
1969 Baltimore Colts draft
| Round | Pick | Player | Position | College | Notes |
| 1 | 25 | Eddie Hinton | Wide receiver | Oklahoma | |
| 2 | 33 | Ted Hendricks * ^{†} | Linebacker | Miami (FL) | |
| 2 | 51 | Tommy Maxwell | Defensive back | Texas A&M | |
| 3 | 77 | Dennis Nelson | Tackle | Illinois State | Played with Colts 1970–74 |
| 4 | 87 | Jacky Stewart | Running back | Texas Tech | |
| 5 | 129 | King Dunlap | Defensive tackle | Tennessee State | |
| 6 | 154 | Bill Fortier | Tackle | LSU | |
| 7 | 163 | Gary Fleming | Defensive end | Samford | |
| 7 | 181 | Roland Moss | Tight end | Toledo | |
| 8 | 207 | Sam Havrilak | Wide receiver | Bucknell | |
| 9 | 210 | George Wright | Sam Houston State | Defensive tackle | Played with Colts 1970–71 |
| 9 | 232 | Larry Good | Quarterback | Georgia Tech | |
| 10 | 259 | Marion Griffin | Tight end | Purdue | |
| 11 | 285 | Ken Delaney | Tackle | Akron | |
| 12 | 310 | Butch Riley | Linebacker | Texas A&I | |
| 13 | 337 | Carl Mauck | Center | Southern Illinois | |
| 14 | 363 | Dave Bartelt | Linebacker | Colorado | |
| 15 | 389 | George Thompson | Defensive back | Marquette | |
| 16 | 415 | Jim McMillan | Running back | The Citadel | |
| 17 | 441 | Joe Cowan | Wide receiver | Johns Hopkins | |
Made roster † Pro Football Hall of Fame * Made at least one Pro Bowl during career

== Personnel ==
=== Staff/coaches ===
1969 Baltimore Colts staff
| Front office: Owner/president and treasurer – Carroll Rosenbloom; General manager – Harry Hulmes; Coaching staff: Head coach – Don Shula; Offensive coaches: Receivers/offensive ends – Dick Bielski; Offensive backs – Don McCafferty; Offensive line coach – John Sandusky | Defensive coaches: Defensive coordinator/defensive line – Bill Arnsparger; Defensive backfield – Bobby Boyd; Linebackers coach – Don Shula |

=== Roster ===
1969 Baltimore Colts roster
| Quarterbacks (QB): 15 Earl Morrall; 19 Johnny Unitas; Running backs (RB): 34 Terry Cole; 48 Larry Conjar; 45 Jerry Hill; 41 Tom Matte; 26 Preston Pearson; Wide receivers (WR): 17 Sam Havrilak; 33 Eddie Hinton; 27 Ray Perkins; 87 Willie Richardson; Tight ends (TE): 88 John Mackey; 44 Roland Moss | Offensive linemen (OL): 73 Sam Ball T; 50 Bill Curry C; 61 Cornelius Johnson G; 67 Carl Mauck C; 71 Dan Sullivan G; 72 Bob Vogel T; 75 John Williams G; Defensive linemen (DL): 65 Ron Kostelnik DT; 85 Roy Hilton DE; 76 Fred Miller DT; 74 Billy Ray Smith DT; 78 Bubba Smith DE | Linebackers (LB): 55 John Campbell OLB; 32 Mike Curtis MLB; 53 Dennis Gaubatz MLB; 51 Bob Grant OLB; 83 Ted Hendricks OLB; 54 Butch Riley MLB; Defensive backs (DB): 37 Ocie Austin CB/S; 35 Jim Duncan CB; 20 Jerry Logan SS; 43 Lenny Lyles CB; 42 Tommy Maxwell CB; 47 Charlie Stukes CB; 21 Rick Volk FS; Special teams (ST): 49 David Lee P; 79 Lou Michaels K | Practice squad: 18 Jeff Beaver QB; 23 David Bennett RB; 46 Jim McMillan WR; Reserve: 31 Perry Lee Dunn RB (IR); 84 Tom Mitchell TE (IR); 68 Dennis Nelson T (Miltitary); 52 Robbie Nichols LB (Miltitary); 28 Jimmy Orr WR (IR); 62 Glenn Ressler G (IR); 36 Jack Stewart RB (IR); 16 Jim Ward QB (IR); 60 George Wright DT (Miltitary); Rookies in italics |

== Regular season ==
=== Schedule ===
| Week | Date | Opponent | Result | Record | Venue | Attendance | Recap |
|---|---|---|---|---|---|---|---|
| 1 | September 21 | **Los Angeles Rams** | **L** 20–27 | 0–1 | Memorial Stadium | 56,864 | Recap |
| 2 | September 28 | at Minnesota Vikings | **L** 14–52 | 0–2 | Metropolitan Stadium | 47,644 | Recap |
| 3 | October 5 | at **Atlanta Falcons** | **W** 21–14 | 1–2 | Grant Field | 57,806 | Recap |
| 4 | October 13 | Philadelphia Eagles | **W** 24–20 | 2–2 | Memorial Stadium | 56,864 | Recap |
| 5 | October 19 | at New Orleans Saints | **W** 30–10 | 3–2 | Tulane Stadium | 80,636 | Recap |
| 6 | October 26 | **San Francisco 49ers** | **L** 21–24 | 3–3 | Memorial Stadium | 60,238 | Recap |
| 7 | November 2 | Washington Redskins | **W** 41–17 | 4–3 | Memorial Stadium | 60,238 | Recap |
| 8 | November 9 | Green Bay Packers | **W** 14–6 | 5–3 | Memorial Stadium | 60,238 | Recap |
| 9 | November 16 | at **San Francisco 49ers** | **L** 17–20 | 5–4 | Kezar Stadium | 38,472 | Recap |
| 10 | November 23 | at Chicago Bears | **W** 24–21 | 6–4 | Wrigley Field | 45,455 | Recap |
| 11 | November 30 | **Atlanta Falcons** | **W** 13–6 | 7–4 | Memorial Stadium | 60,238 | Recap |
| 12 | December 7 | Detroit Lions | **T** 17–17 | 7–4–1 | Memorial Stadium | 60,238 | Recap |
| 13 | December 13 | at Dallas Cowboys | **L** 10–27 | 7–5–1 | Cotton Bowl | 63,191 | Recap |
| 14 | December 21 | at **Los Angeles Rams** | **W** 13–7 | 8–5–1 | Los Angeles Memorial Coliseum | 73,326 | Recap |
Note: Intra-division opponents are in **bold** text.

=== Season summary ===
==== Week 1 vs Rams ====
Week One: Los Angeles Rams (0–0) at Baltimore Colts (0–0)

| Quarter | 1 | 2 | 3 | 4 | Total |
|---|---|---|---|---|---|
| **Rams** | 3 | 7 | 10 | 7 | **27** |
| Colts | 0 | 10 | 7 | 3 | **20** |

at Memorial Stadium, Baltimore, Maryland

- Date: September 21
- Game weather: 63 °F or 17.2 °C, relative humidity 64%, wind 10 miles per hour (16 km/h; 8.7 kn)
- Game attendance: 56,864
- Referee: Tommy Bell

Game information

**First quarter**

- LA – Bruce Gossett 29-yard field goal. Rams 3–0. Drive:

**Second quarter**

- BAL – Tom Mitchell 13-yard pass from Johnny Unitas (Lou Michaels kick). Colts 7–3. Drive:
- LA – Billy Truax 4-yard pass from Roman Gabriel (Bruce Gossett kick). Rams 10–7. Drive:
- BAL – Lou Michaels 15-yard field goal. Tie 10–10. Drive:

**Third quarter**

- BAL – Jimmy Orr 41-yard pass from Johnny Unitas (Lou Michaels kick). Colts 17–10. Drive:
- LA – Willie Ellison 14-yard pass from Roman Gabriel (Bruce Gossett kick). Tie 17–17. Drive:
- LA – Bruce Gossett 15-yard field goal. Rams 20–17. Drive:

**Fourth quarter**

- LA – Wendell Tucker 16-yard pass from Roman Gabriel (Bruce Gossett kick). Rams 27–17. Drive:
- BAL – Lou Michaels 41-yard field goal. Rams 27–20. Drive:

Top passers

- LA – Roman Gabriel – 20/33, 268 yards, 3 TD
- BAL – Johnny Unitas – 20/42, 297 yards, 2 TD, 3 INT

Top rushers

- LA – Larry Smith – 10 rushes, 73 yards
- BAL – Preston Pearson – 11 rushes, 43 yards

Top receivers

- LA – Wendell Tucker – 6 receptions, 90 yards, TD
- BAL – Jimmy Orr – 5 receptions, 87 yards, TD

==== Week 6 vs 49ers ====
Week Six: San Francisco 49ers (0–4–1) at Baltimore Colts (3–2)

| Quarter | 1 | 2 | 3 | 4 | Total |
|---|---|---|---|---|---|
| **49ers** | 0 | 10 | 14 | 0 | **24** |
| Colts | 0 | 7 | 7 | 7 | **21** |

at Memorial Stadium, Baltimore, Maryland

- Date: October 26, 1969
- Game weather: 48 °F or 8.9 °C, relative humidity 49%, wind 5 miles per hour (8.0 km/h; 4.3 kn)
- Referee: Jack Vest

Game information

**First quarter**

- No scoring plays

**Second quarter**

- SF — Tommy Davis 18-yard field goal. 49ers 3–0
- BAL — Tom Matte 11-yard pass from Johnny Unitas (Lou Michaels kick). Colts 7–3
- SF — Ken Willard 5-yard rush (Tommy Davis kick). 49ers 10–7

**Third quarter**

- SF — Dick Witcher 18-yard pass from Steve Spurrier (Tommy Davis kick). 49ers 17–7
- SF — John Woitt 57-yard interception return (Tommy Davis kick). 49ers 24–7
- BAL — Jimmy Orr 6 yard pass from Johnny Unitas (Lou Michaels kick). 49ers 24–14

**Fourth quarter**

- BAL — Tom Matte 1 yard rush (Lou Michaels kick). 49ers 24–21

Top passers

- SF — Steve Spurrier – 18/30, 205 yards, TD, INT
- BAL — Johnny Unitas – 19/37, 300 yards, 2 TD, 3 INT

Top rushers

- SF — Doug Cunningham – 13 rushes, 51 yards
- BAL — Tom Matte – 17 rushes, 81 yards, TD

Top receivers

- SF — Dick Witcher – 3 receptions, 54 yards, TD
- BAL — Jimmy Orr – 8 receptions, 146 yards, TD

The loss ended the Colts 13-game winning streak against the 49ers, losing to them for the first time since the 1962 season. This would be the last time the 49ers would visit the Colts until 1989, by when Robert Irsay had moved the franchise to Indianapolis. The 49ers would next play in Baltimore when meeting the Ravens in 2003.

== Standings ==
NFL Coastal
| | W | L | T | PCT | DIV | CONF | PF | PA | STK |
|---|---|---|---|---|---|---|---|---|---|
| Los Angeles Rams | 11 | 3 | 0 | .786 | 5–1 | 7–3 | 320 | 243 | L3 |
| Baltimore Colts | 8 | 5 | 1 | .615 | 3–3 | 5–4–1 | 279 | 268 | W1 |
| Atlanta Falcons | 6 | 8 | 0 | .429 | 2–4 | 4–6 | 276 | 268 | W3 |
| San Francisco 49ers | 4 | 8 | 2 | .333 | 2–4 | 3–7 | 277 | 319 | W1 |

Note: Tie games were not officially counted in the standings until 1972.

== See also ==
- History of the Indianapolis Colts
- Indianapolis Colts seasons
- Colts–Patriots rivalry
