= Bob Klein =

American football player (born 1947)

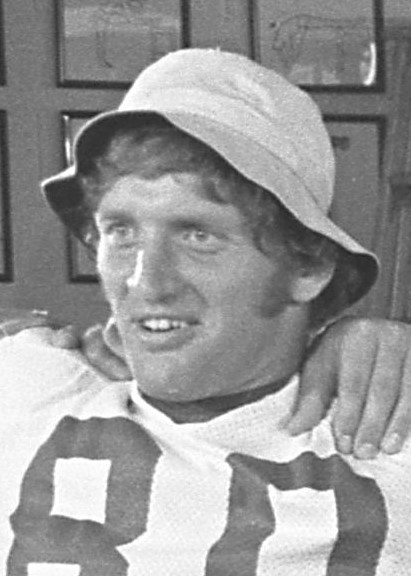
- Klein in 1975

No. 80, 84
- Position: Tight end

Personal information
- Born: July 27, 1947 (age 79); South Gate, California, U.S.
- Listed height: 6 ft 5 in (1.96 m)
- Listed weight: 235 lb (107 kg)

Career information
- High school: Saint Monica Catholic (Santa Monica, California)
- College: USC
- NFL draft: 1969: 1st round, 21st overall pick

Career history
- Los Angeles Rams (1969–1976); San Diego Chargers (1977–1979)

Awards and highlights
- National champion (1967); First-team All-Pac-8 (1968); Second-team All-Pac-8 (1967)

Career NFL statistics
- Receptions: 219
- Receiving yards: 2,687
- Receiving touchdowns: 23
- Stats at Pro Football Reference

Robert Owen Klein (born July 27, 1947) is an American former professional football player who was a tight end. for eleven seasons in the National Football League (NFL) with the Los Angeles Rams and San Diego Chargers.

Klein played college football for the USC Trojans in Los Angeles, where he was the starting tight end for their 1967 national championship team. Following his senior season in 1968, he was selected 21st overall in the 1969 NFL/AFL draft by the Los Angeles Rams. At USC, Klein was part of the Gamma Tau chapter of Beta Theta Pi fraternity.

== Los Angeles Rams ==
In his first two seasons with the Rams, Klein served as the backup tight end to veteran Billy Truax. While he appeared in all 14 games in his rookie season, he had only two receptions as he was primarily a blocker in the Rams' run oriented offense. However, he did catch a touchdown pass in the 23–20 playoff loss to the Vikings in chilly Minnesota.

After the 1970 season, the Rams traded Truax to the Dallas Cowboys for wide receiver Lance Rentzel, and Klein took over the Rams' starting tight end position. An excellent blocker, Klein also expanded his repertoire so that he averaged 21 receptions per season from 1971 to 1976.

== San Diego Chargers ==
Following the 1976 season, Klein was traded to the San Diego Chargers. Playing in the Chargers' high powered passing attack led by hall of fame quarterback Dan Fouts, Klein caught 91 passes for 8 touchdowns from 1977 to 1979. Klein was then replaced by future hall of fame tight end Kellen Winslow and retired after the 1979 season.

== NFL career statistics ==
Legend
**Bold**	Career high

=== Regular season ===
Year	Team	Games		Receiving				
Year	Team	GP	GS	Rec	Yds	Avg	Lng	TD
1969	RAM	14	1	2	17	8.5	16	1
1970	RAM	7	0	2	20	10.0	12	0
1971	RAM	14	14	14	160	11.4	33	4
1972	RAM	14	13	29	330	11.4	26	1
1973	RAM	14	14	21	277	13.2	23	2
1974	RAM	14	14	24	336	14.0	32	4
1975	RAM	11	11	16	237	**14.8**	44	2
1976	RAM	14	14	20	229	11.5	26	1
1977	SDG	12	9	20	244	12.2	41	1
1978	SDG	16	16	34	413	12.1	24	2
1979	SDG	15	14	**37**	**424**	11.5	**54**	**5**
		145	120	219	2,687	12.3	54	23

=== Playoffs ===
Year	Team	Games		Receiving				
Year	Team	GP	GS	Rec	Yds	Avg	Lng	TD
1969	RAM	1	0	1	3	3.0	3	**1**
1973	RAM	1	1	0	0	0.0	0	0
1974	RAM	2	2	3	33	11.0	13	**1**
1976	RAM	2	2	1	12	**12.0**	12	0
1979	SDG	1	1	**5**	**41**	8.2	**16**	0
		7	6	10	89	8.9	16	2

== Honors ==
In a 1985 vote of the fans, Klein was named as the tight end on the Los Angeles Rams' 40th Anniversary Team.

== Personal life ==
Klein has three children and is married. He is the president and CEO of Saint John's Health Center Foundation
