= Billy Truax =

American football player (1943–2026)

No. 87
- Position: Tight end

Personal information
- Born: July 15, 1943; Gulfport, Mississippi, U.S.
- Died: January 7, 2026 (aged 82)
- Listed height: 6 ft 5 in (1.96 m)
- Listed weight: 240 lb (109 kg)

Career information
- High school: Holy Cross (New Orleans, Louisiana)
- College: LSU
- NFL draft: 1964: 2nd round, 26th overall pick
- AFL draft: 1964: 2nd round, 14th overall pick

Career history
- Cleveland Browns (1964)*; Los Angeles Rams (1964–1970); Dallas Cowboys (1971–1973); New York Giants (1974)*
- * Offseason or practice squad member only

Awards and highlights
- Super Bowl champion (VI); Second-team All-SEC (1963)

Career NFL statistics
- Receptions: 199
- Receiving yards: 2,458
- Receiving touchdowns: 17
- Stats at Pro Football Reference

William Frederick Truax III (July 15, 1943 – January 7, 2026) was an American professional football player who was a tight end in the National Football League (NFL) for the Los Angeles Rams and Dallas Cowboys. He played college football for the Louisiana State University (LSU) Tigers. Truax was among the earliest tight ends during the 1960s to play in the style established by such tight ends as John Mackey, Mike Ditka, and Ron Kramer in being equally talented as pass receivers and powerful blockers. During Truax's prime years as a starter (1966 to 1971), his teams had a combined record of 60–20–4, went to the playoffs three times, and won Super Bowl VI. In the Cowboys' 1971 Super Bowl winning season, Truax was part of coach Tom Landry's offensive play calling system where Landry would alternate Truax and Ditka at tight end after every play to bring Landry's offensive play instructions to the Cowboys quarterback.

As a senior at LSU, playing in the Southeastern Conference (SEC), he was selected first-team All-SEC by United Press International and second-team All-SEC by the Associated Press, which also recognized Truax as an honorable mention All-American. During his three years of varsity football, the LSU Tigers won the 1963 Cotton Bowl, were ranked in the top-10 nationally twice by the Associated Press, and had a 26–6–1 overall record. In 2021, Truax was inducted into the Louisiana State University Athletic Hall of Fame.

== Early life ==
Truax was born on July 15, 1943, in Gulfport, Mississippi, to William Frederick Truax II and Kathleen Anna Donohoe Truax. He was the second of six children. At age 12, he was enrolled in Holy Cross School, a boarding school in New Orleans from which he graduated at age 16. He was a member of the football, basketball, baseball and track and field teams at Holy Cross, playing all four sports in 1959. He was unable to play all four sports as a senior in 1960, missing baseball and track due to a shoulder injury. He played as an end and kicker in football; center and forward in basketball; catcher, outfielder, third baseman and first baseman in baseball; and threw the discus on the track team (setting a discus record as a junior).

In November 1958, the Times Picayune named the 15-year old Truax an All-Prep and All-Catholic All-Star in football, as an end. As a 16-year old senior, he was 6 ft 4 in (1.93 m), and received All-State and All-Prep honors in football. In 1959, he also won All-State honors in track, and started on both the basketball and baseball teams for Holy Cross. In February 1959, the Times-Picayune named Truax second-team All-Catholic in basketball, and third-team All-Prep in basketball. The Times-Picayune selected Truax as its four-sport Athlete of the Year for 1959. In 1959, he also was honorable-mention All-Southern in football. He received an All-American nomination spot for Louisiana honors.

He led the Holy Cross basketball team to the Catholic Youth Organization tournament title in 1959, and was named the most outstanding player in that tournament. He was selected to play for the South team in the high school football All-American Gridiron Classic, held in Baton Rouge in August 1960. The game included top high school football players from across the United States. He was also selected to play in the Louisiana High School Athletic Association All-Star Game earlier in August that year.

In 1972, Truax was honored by the Holy Cross Alumni Association for his efforts in fundraising for the school and raising money for scholarships to the children of deceased Holy Cross alumni.

== College career ==
In June 1960, Truax accepted a football scholarship from Louisiana State University (LSU). At the time he was 6 ft 5 in (1.96 m) 235 lb (106.6 kg). He was personally signed by LSU head coach Paul Dietzel. In choosing to attend LSU, he turned down appointments at the United States Military Academy, United States Naval Academy, and the Air Force Academy, and scholarship offers from the University of Tennessee and University of Mississippi; stating he wanted to play on a team that could contend for a national championship and that he wanted to play for coach Dietzel. As a freshman, he played on the junior varsity team and suffered a broken leg against Mississippi State University that ended his freshman season in November 1960.

Dietzel considered redshirting Truax for the 1961 season, but changed his mind believing Truax could help them win that season. LSU had a 10–1 win-loss record, and finished the season ranked No. 4 by the Associated Press (AP). Truax became a starter as a sophomore (1961) and was mainly used as a blocker in the team's rushing attack that year and throughout his LSU career. LSU gained 2,196 rushing yards during the 10-game season, and 695 passing yards. The running backs were led by Earl Gros (406 yards/4.5 yards per carry), Jerry Stovall (405 yards/6.2 yards per carry), and Bo Campbell (319 yards/6.6 yards per carry). Truax had five receptions (fifth on the team) for 61 yards (12.2 yards per reception average).

During LSU's 10–7 victory over Ole Miss that season, Truax gained a critical first down for LSU by catching a fourth down pass that led to LSU's only touchdown of the game. The pass was underthrown by quarterback Lynn Amedee, and Truax had to make a shoestring catch to save the play, paving the way for LSU's upset of the then No. 2 ranked Ole Miss team. Coach Dietzel said after the game, "Truax'[sic] catch won the football game . . . No one else on the team could have made that catch". LSU tied Alabama for the Southeastern Conference (SEC) championship. After winning 10 straight games, LSU lost in the 1962 Orange Bowl to Colorado, 25–7.

In 1962, LSU's offense rushed for 1,960 yards and had 719 receiving yards during the season. Along with Stovall and Campbell, Charles Cranford and Steve Ward were the team's leading rushers. Truax had three receptions for 101 yards (third on the team), a 33.7-yards per reception average (leading the team) and one touchdown. Truax had a 50-yard touchdown reception from Amedee in a late November game against Tulane. The Tigers had a 9–1–1 record that season, and were ranked No. 7 by the AP. LSU defeated No. 4 ranked Texas in the 1963 Cotton Bowl, 13–0. Truax had an apparent touchdown reception erased by a penalty in the Cotton Bowl.

As a senior (1963), Truax was named a team captain during the season by his teammates; and after the season ended he was recognized as a permanent team captain for the 1963 LSU team, as elected by his teammates. In 1958, coach Dietzel had created the "white unit" at LSU, consisting of the team's 11 best players who would play both offense and defense. After two years at offensive end, Dietzel moved Truax up to the white unit for the 1963 season. Truax led the team with 10 receptions for 112 yards (11.2 yard per reception) and one touchdown; on a team that had only 412 passing yards during the season. On defense, he had two interceptions and three fumble recoveries. LSU was 7–4 overall, and lost in the Bluebonnet Bowl to Baylor, 14–7. Truax caught a pass during LSU's lone scoring drive, and also caused a fumble on defense.

In 1963, Truax was an AP honorable mention All-American. He was also named an All-American by The Football News. United Press International named Truax first-team All-SEC as a senior, and the AP named him second-team All-SEC. Truax was selected to play in the Senior Bowl. Truax was chosen to play in the 1964 Chicago College All-Star Game, but was unable to play because of a hamstring injury suffered during the Cleveland Browns training camp.

== Professional career ==
=== Cleveland Browns ===
Truax was selected by the Cleveland Browns in the second round (26th overall) of the 1964 NFL draft. He also was selected by the Houston Oilers in the second round (14th overall) of the 1964 AFL draft. Both the Browns and Oilers pursued Truax, who was still only 20-years old at the time. He signed with the Browns in late December 1963, after negotiating a deal with the Browns' Paul Bixler.

The Browns opened their quarterback camp on July 13, 1964, with some veterans and rookies expected to attend, including Truax. Browns' head coach Blanton Collier wanted to see rookies Truax, Paul Warfield, and Dick Van Raaphorst before they had to leave the Browns' camp on July 16 to join the college all-stars in preparing for the Chicago College All-Star Game. On July 15 (Truax's 21st birthday), he suffered a pulled hamstring. Collier had intended to try Truax at linebacker (outside linebacker) or defensive end, but after the hamstring injury slowed Truax, Collier moved him to defensive end. Six weeks later, on August 31, Truax was traded to the Los Angeles Rams without having played a down for the Browns, in exchange for a 1965 second round draft choice (which became the 22nd pick in the 1965 NFL draft and was used by the Browns to select Gerry Bussell).

=== Los Angeles Rams ===
In 1964, the Rams tried Truax at defensive end before settling him at tight end. In his first season with the Rams, he played in six or 10 games, with no receptions, under head coach Harland Svare. In 1965, he played in all 14 Rams games, starting three. He had six receptions for 108 yards, including a 59-yard touchdown reception from Rams' quarterback Roman Gabriel. In his first two seasons he played mainly on the special teams units.

In 1966, George Allen replaced Svare as the Rams' head coach, having previously been defensive coordinator with the Chicago Bears. As a defensive coordinator planning against opposing team's offenses, he had come to understand the value of tight ends who were receivers as well as blockers, like Hall of Famer John Mackey and Ron Kramer; as well as observing the Bears own future Pro Football Hall of Fame tight end Mike Ditka. These receiver tight ends created pass coverage difficulties for safeties and linebackers. Allen believed Truax could be one of these receiving tight ends.

Truax became the Rams starting tight end during training camp in 1966, after starting tight end Marlin McKeever was seriously injured in a motor vehicle accident (including the loss of a finger). Truax began the season as the Rams starting tight end. In the season's third game, on September 25, he had seven receptions against the Green Bay Packers for 62 yards; the most receptions and receiving yards of any Ram receiver that day (in which the Rams had only 67 net receiving yards).

On the season, he started nine games at tight end, and McKeever started five. Truax had 29 receptions for 314 yards, and McKeever had 23 catches for 277 yards. Truax's ability as a receiver in the 10-to-12 yard range kept defenses from being able to double team wide receiver Jack Snow. The Rams were 8–6 on the season, finishing third in the NFL's West Division. Truax's one touchdown came on a fumble recovery.

The Rams traded McKeever after the 1966 season (March 1967). McKeever held no ill will toward the Rams, and said at the time of the trade that the Rams' tight end position was in good hands with Truax and Hal Bedsole. Truax went on to start all 14 games at tight end for the Rams in 1967.

In 1967, the Rams' record improved to 11–1–2, winning first place in the Coastal Division over the Baltimore Colts (also 11–1–2); whom they beat on the last day of the regular season to win their division. In discussing the improvements and success of the Rams' 1967 offense, Colts' Pro Football Hall of Fame quarterback Johnny Unitas was said to have attributed it to Roman Gabriel's maturing as a quarterback, Les Josephson's running, and Truax's "savage blocking and adept receptions on short throws". In 1967, Truax recorded 37 receptions (tied for second on the team) for 487 yards (third on the team) and four touchdowns. In the decisive Game 14 against the Colts, he had a team-high five receptions; for 51 yards and one touchdown. Earlier, in a mid-October tie with the Colts, Truax led the team with six receptions; gaining 74 yards. Truax had two receptions for 45 yards in the Rams 1967 divisional round playoff loss to the Packers.

In 1968, although Truax was limited with a broken bone in his left wrist for most of the season, he had a team-leading 35 receptions for 417 yards (fourth on the team) and three touchdowns. Truax had 23 receptions through the first six games of the 1968 season, but only 12 for the remaining eight, and missed some playing time. In the sixth game against the Atlanta Falcons he had seven receptions for 111 yards and a touchdown; leading the team to a 6–0 record. He suffered the injury in the season's seventh game, against the Colts, the Rams first loss of the season. The Rams finished the season 10–3–1, second to the Colts in the Coastal Division.

In 1969, Truax had 37 receptions (fourth on the team) for 431 yards (third on the team) and five touchdowns. The Rams' offense was based upon a balanced passing attack, with five players having between 32 and 49 receptions. Truax considered this season as his career-best as a blocker up to that time. He attributed some of his development as a blocker to practicing against Rams teammates Jack Pardee, Maxie Baughan, and Deacon Jones. In the divisional playoff loss to the Minnesota Vikings, 23–20, Truax had a receiving touchdown and led the team with 47 receiving yards, on five receptions.

In 1970, he registered 36 receptions (third on the team) for 420 yards (third on the team) and three touchdowns. His best game of the season, and arguably his career, came on November 1 against the New Orleans Saints, when he had 124 yards on six receptions. On May 19, 1971, Truax was traded along with wide receiver Wendell Tucker to the Dallas Cowboys in exchange for wide receiver Lance Rentzel.

=== Dallas Cowboys ===
In 1971, Truax was limited with torn cartilage in his left knee that would require surgery after the season ended. He still played in 12 games (10 starts). The starting tight end in the other four games was 11-year veteran and future Pro Football Hall of Fame tight end Mike Ditka. Cowboys coach Tom Landry called the team's offensive plays by alternately sending Truax and Ditka into the game before each play to tell the quarterbacks Roger Staubach or Craig Morton what play to call.

Truax only had 15 receptions for 232 yards and one touchdown, but was a part of the Cowboys' Super Bowl VI championship team. Truax had two receptions for 43 yards in the Cowboys' NFC Championship Game victory over the San Francisco 49ers. He continued alternating with Ditka to bring in Landry's plays through the Super Bowl, which was played in New Orleans that year, making the victory even more gratifying to Truax. He humorously said after the game, "Everything went right, I think you'd have to say that Landry is one of the all-time great quarterbacks". When giving speeches after that Super Bowl victory, Staubach himself would jokingly begin "'I keep waiting for Billy Truax or Mike Ditka to arrive with my speech'".

In 1972, Truax had a difficult time recovering after his off-season knee surgery. He played in only six games, with four receptions for 49 yards on the entire season; three of those coming in a September 24 game against the New York Giants. Truax was not on the active roster after October 22. Even before that, Landry began using rookie tight end Jean Fugett to alternate with Ditka in Landry's play-calling messenger system that season. Ditka reportedly started all 14 games at tight end for the Cowboys that season (his last in the NFL), but it has also been reported that Fugett also started for the Cowboys in 1972.

In 1973, the Cowboys drafted tight end Billy Joe DuPree in the first round. After clearing waivers, on September 5, Truax was assigned to the Cowboys' taxi squad. He missed most of the season because of a stomach disorder (ulcer) and appeared in only two games for the Cowboys (September 16 and September 24) without registering any statistics. He was placed on the injured reserve list on October 26, ending his season. Truax was not re-signed after the season.

Over his 10-year NFL career, Truax started 78 games, with 199 receptions for 2,458 yards and 17 touchdowns. During his five seasons starting for the Rams (1966 to 1970), the team was 49–17–4. In his one season starting the majority of games for the Cowboys, and sharing tight end responsibilities with Mike Ditka, the team was 11–3 and won the Super Bowl.

=== New York Giants and World Football League ===
On April 15, 1974, it was reported that Truax was signed as a free agent by the New York Giants. Within a few days, howerer, Truax denied he had signed with the Giants and said he was still a free agent. Truax stated that he was in contact with several World Football League teams. He had been drafted by the Portland Storm of the new league in March 1974. He did not play for the Giants or Portland in 1974.

== Legacy and honors ==
Truax's receptions in the NFL were typically in the 10-to-15 yard range, in the middle of the field, while knowing he would be hit hard by a defensive player. When asked how he was able to consistently make these catches in such difficult circumstances, he said "It's mostly concentration, keeping loose and disciplining yourself to ignore the smashing tackle you know is coming". He had a variety of nicknames in the NFL. On the Rams he was known as Bluto, "The Giraffe", and "The Neck". Opposing linebackers called him "The Spear" because of the way he used his helmet in blocking them. Associated Press sportswriter Bob Myers once described Truax's neck as being comparable in size to the Rams 300 lb (136.1 kg) defensive tackle Roger Brown's thigh. In Dallas, he was also referred to as "The Tree".

According to the son of Rams head coach George Allen, former U. S. Senator George Allen, coach Allen had "'much affection, gratitude and love for Billy Truax'". He found that "Truax was consistently a humble, beloved teammate and player who always did his job with cheer, perseverance, 110% effort and attention to every detail that my father tried to get from every player, coach and staff member'".

In 2019, Truax was inducted into the Sugar Bowl's Greater New Orleans Sports Hall of Fame. In 2021, he was inducted into the Louisiana State University Athletic Hall of Fame. In 2015, he was inducted into the Holy Cross School Sports Hall of Fame.

== Personal life and death ==
After graduating from Holy Cross in 1960, he worked on an oil rig for a time. His cousin Dalton Truax played offensive tackle in the American Football League for the Oakland Raiders in 1960. In 1974, he lived with his wife and three children in Dallas, working with James L. Terry Investments. He later established Truax Investments and had a career as a commercial real estate broker and developer. His son Chris was a guard for four years on LSU's football team, including the 1988 SEC Championship team. Chris Truax later became the offensive line coach at McNeese State University.

After Hurricane Katrina in 2005, Truax moved to Kearney, Nebraska, where he had family members nearby. Truax died in Denton, Texas on January 7, 2026, at the age of 82. He was predeceased by two grandchildren and survived by his three children and seven other grandchildren.

== NFL career statistics ==
Legend
	Won the Super Bowl
**Bold**	Career high

=== Regular season ===
Year	Team	Games		Receiving				
Year	Team	GP	GS	Rec	Yds	Avg	Lng	TD
1964	RAM	10	1	0	0	0.0	0	0
1965	RAM	14	2	6	108	**18.0**	**59**	1
1966	RAM	14	7	29	314	10.8	21	0
1967	RAM	14	14	**37**	**487**	13.2	41	4
1968	RAM	14	12	35	417	11.9	22	3
1969	RAM	14	13	**37**	431	11.6	49	**5**
1970	RAM	14	14	36	420	11.7	34	3
1971	DAL	12	10	15	232	15.5	25	1
1972	DAL	6	0	4	49	12.3	18	0
1973	DAL	2	0	0	0	0.0	0	0
Career		114	73	199	2,458	12.4	59	17

=== Playoffs ===
Year	Team	Games		Receiving				
Year	Team	GP	GS	Rec	Yds	Avg	Lng	TD
1967	RAM	1	1	2	45	**22.5**	**31**	0
1969	RAM	1	1	**5**	**47**	9.4	18	**1**
1971	DAL	3	0	2	43	21.5	22	0
1972	DAL	2	0	1	2	2.0	2	0
Career		7	2	10	137	13.7	31	1
