= Jack Snow (American football) =

American football player (1943–2006)

No. 84
- Position: Wide receiver

Personal information
- Born: January 25, 1943; Rock Springs, Wyoming, U.S.
- Died: January 9, 2006 (aged 62); St. Louis, Missouri, U.S.
- Listed height: 6 ft 2 in (1.88 m)
- Listed weight: 190 lb (86 kg)

Career information
- High school: St. Anthony's (Long Beach, California)
- College: Notre Dame
- NFL draft: 1965: 1st round, 8th overall pick
- AFL draft: 1965: 7th round, 54th overall pick

Career history
- Minnesota Vikings (1965)*; Los Angeles Rams (1965–1975)
- * Offseason or practice squad member only

Awards and highlights
- Pro Bowl (1967); St. Louis Football Ring of Fame; National champion (1964); Consensus All-American (1964)

Career NFL statistics
- Receptions: 340
- Receiving yards: 6,012
- Receiving touchdowns: 45
- Stats at Pro Football Reference

Jack Thomas Snow (January 25, 1943 – January 9, 2006) was an American professional football player who played wide receiver with the Los Angeles Rams of the NFL from 1965 to 1975. He played college football for the Notre Dame Fighting Irish from 1962 through 1964.

== Early life ==
Snow was born on January 25, 1943, in Rock Springs, Wyoming, and grew up in Long Beach, California. He was a three-sport star at St. Anthony Boys' High School, Long Beach, California, who totaled 10 varsity letters in football, baseball, and basketball, graduating in 1961. He was an All-State football player in his senior year, playing offensive and defensive end and had a .458 batting average as a baseball player. He was named captain of the 1960 Catholic League Championship team in baseball and in 1960 was chosen City of Long Beach Lineman of the Year. As a senior, he was also All-CIF, All-City, and All-Catholic League in football and All-City and All-Catholic League in baseball. In 2013, Snow was in the inaugural class inducted into St. Anthony's Sports Hall of Fame.

== College football career ==
Snow attended the University of Notre Dame and played on the football team from 1962-1964. His most memorable college football year was his senior year, 1964.

In his senior year at Notre Dame, he was a consensus All-American and finished fifth in the Heisman Trophy voting behind the winner, Notre Dame quarterback John Huarte. It was also future college football Hall of Fame coach Ara Parseghian's first season with Notre Dame. >

Parseghian made several key position switches that year. Snow had been a flanker playing out of the backfield. In 1962, he had only four receptions and in 1963, he had six receptions and three rushing attempts. In 1964, Parseghian moved him to split end. Snow lost 15 pounds to compete more effectively as a split receiver.

Notre Dame's passing offense in Parseghian's first season helped produce 27 team and individual records. Snow set Notre Dame season records for receptions (60), receiving yards (1,114), and touchdown catches (9). In the first game of the year, he set a record against Wisconsin with 217 receiving yards (also catching two touchdowns); breaking the previous record of 208 receiving yards in a game, set in 1955 by Jim Morse in a game against the University of Southern California (on only five catches). By the end of the year, Snow also had the school's career receiving-yards record (1,242). Snow's record-breaking efforts more than doubled the old record for receiving yards in a season, and was 19 more than the previous reception record in a season. Snow also averaged nearly 37 yards per kick as the 1964 team's punter.

He was selected to the 1965 College All Star team.

== NFL career ==
The Minnesota Vikings selected Snow in the first round (he was the eighth pick overall) in the 1965 NFL draft, but soon traded him to the Rams. Snow broke into the Rams' starting lineup in his rookie season of 1965 and remained there. In 1967, he averaged a career-high 26.3 yards per reception and scored eight touchdowns on his 28 receptions. He was named to the West squad in the NFL Pro Bowl in 1967, but did not appear in the game.

Snow gained a reputation for catching the long pass from quarterback Roman Gabriel. In an important division game against the Baltimore Colts in October 1967, Snow caught touchdown passes of 53 and 80 yards. His teammate, Hall of Fame defensive end Deacon Jones, said Snow was a tough player, and one of the few receivers willing go across the middle of the field to make receptions. He remained a Rams' starter through 1974, when he started all 14 games alongside Harold Jackson (at wide receiver), and did not start any games in 1975. In these last two years, he divided time with fellow receivers Lance Rentzel, Jackson, and Ron Jessie (who started 14 games in 1975 alongside Jackson). Snow finished his professional career with 340 receptions and 45 touchdowns; his 6,012 career receiving yards ranked 30th in NFL history.

== Acting and broadcasting career ==
Snow appeared in the 1969 motion picture Marooned. He appeared as himself in the 1969 episode "Samantha's Shopping Spree" of the television series Bewitched. He played Cassidy in the comedy Heaven Can Wait.

Following his NFL career, Snow went into the real-estate business with college roommate Bob Arboit in Newport Beach, California. He returned to the Rams as a receivers coach in 1982 under Ray Malavasi. In 1992, he joined Los Angeles sports-talk radio station KMPC (now KSPN) as an analyst for Rams radio broadcasts and a daily program host. He was a radio analyst for Rams games for three seasons in Los Angeles, and then continued in that role after the team moved to St. Louis until November 2005, less than two months before his death. Snow was one of a handful of old L.A. Rams still employed by the Rams in the 2005 season.

== Personal life ==
Snow's son, J.T. Snow, was a gold glove-winning first baseman in Major League Baseball from 1992 to 2008.

Jack Snow was involved with a range of charities during his adult life, and in 1970 visited GIs during the war in Viet Nam.

== Death ==
Snow developed a staphylococcal infection in November 2005 and died at age 62 as a result of complications. His wife of 34 years, Merry Carole, had died of cancer in 1998.

== NFL career statistics ==
Legend
	Led the league
**Bold**	Career high

=== Regular season ===
Year	Team	Games		Receiving				
Year	Team	GP	GS	Rec	Yds	Avg	Lng	TD
1965	RAM	**14**	**14**	38	559	14.7	60	3
1966	RAM	**14**	**14**	34	634	18.6	**84**	3
1967	RAM	**14**	**14**	28	735	**26.3**	80	**8**
1968	RAM	**14**	13	29	500	17.2	54	3
1969	RAM	**14**	**14**	49	734	15.0	74	6
1970	RAM	**14**	**14**	**51**	**859**	16.8	71	7
1971	RAM	**14**	**14**	37	666	18.0	68	5
1972	RAM	**14**	**14**	30	590	19.7	57	4
1973	RAM	**14**	**14**	16	252	15.8	38	2
1974	RAM	**14**	**14**	24	397	16.5	44	3
1975	RAM	10	0	4	86	21.5	42	1
Career		150	139	340	6,012	17.7	84	45

== Family ==
Snow's son J.T. Snow is a retired Major League Baseball first baseman for the San Francisco Giants and Anaheim Angels. Following the senior Snow's death, the junior Snow changed his uniform number in his father's memory while playing for the Boston Red Sox.
