= Willie Ellison =

American football player (1945–2019)

No. 33, 24
- Position: Running back

Personal information
- Born: November 1, 1945; Lockhart, Texas, U.S.
- Died: March 11, 2019 (aged 73); Houston, Texas, U.S.
- Listed height: 6 ft 2 in (1.88 m)
- Listed weight: 210 lb (95 kg)

Career information
- High school: Carver (Lockhart)
- College: Texas Southern
- NFL draft: 1967: 2nd round, 33rd overall pick

Career history
- Los Angeles Rams (1967–1972); Kansas City Chiefs (1973–1974)

Awards and highlights
- Pro Bowl (1971)

Career NFL statistics
- Rushing yards: 3,426
- Rushing average: 4.3
- Receptions: 104
- Receiving yards: 888
- Total touchdowns: 30
- Stats at Pro Football Reference

William Henry Ellison (November 1, 1945 – March 11, 2019) was an American professional football player who was a running back for eight seasons in the National Football League (NFL) with the Los Angeles Rams and Kansas City Chiefs. He played college football for the Texas Southern Tigers.

== Early life ==
Ellison was born on November 1, 1945, in Lockhart, Texas. He grew up in Lockhart, and attended Carver High School, where he played on the football team. He also ran track.

== College career ==
Ellison attended Texas Southern University (TSU), where he played on the football team in the Southwestern Athletic Conference (SWAC). He had a 1,000 rushing season at TSU, and held the school's all-time single-game rushing record when he graduated. He was named to the Pittsburgh Courier's 1966 All-America team.

In 2009, he was inducted into the SWAC Hall of Fame. In 2024, he was inducted into the Texas Southern Hall of Fame.

== Professional career ==
The Los Angeles Rams selected Ellison in the second round of the 1967 NFL draft (33rd overall). He was 6 ft 2 in (1.88 m), 210 lb (95 kg), and wore number 33 for the Rams. With starting halfback Les Josephson rushing 178 times for 800 yards, Ellison barely played on offense during his rookie season, though he did return 13 kickoffs for 340 yards.

In 1968, Josephson was out for the season with an achilles injury. Ellison started nine games and had 616 rushing yards in 151 attempts (4.1 yards per carry), with five rushing touchdowns. He also had 20 pass receptions for 248 yards and two more touchdowns. He returned 12 kickoffs for 268 yards.

However, in 1969, playing behind Larry Smith and Josephson, Ellison barely played (no starts, with only 20 rushing attempts and two kickoff returns). Ellison played more in 1970, with four starts, but still had only 90 rushing attempts and 10 receptions; though he did score five rushing touchdowns and two receiving touchdowns. He split time with Larry Smith at halfback, who had 77 rushing attempts that year; while Josephson had the lion's share of rushing attempts with 150.

Ellison took over as starting halfback in 1971, and was the primary running back with 1,000 yards on 211 carries. Smith and Josephson combined had less than 200 rushing attempts. Ellison also had 32 receptions for 238 yards. He was named to the Pro Bowl for the first and only time in his career. United Press International (UPI) selected him second-team All-Conference.

On December 5, 1971, against the New Orleans Saints he rushed 26 times for 247 yards thus breaking Cookie Gilchrist's pro football record of 243 yards. The NFL record at the time was held by Jim Brown, who ran for 237 yards against the Los Angeles Rams in 1957. Ellison was subsequently named NFL Offensive Player of the Week by the Associated Press. The single game rushing record was broken two years later by O.J. Simpson, with 250 yards. As of 2025, Ellison's 247 yards ranks 17th for most rushing yards in a game; Adrien Peterson's 296 yards being the record.

In 1972, Ellison rushed for 764 yards in 170 attempts, and caught 23 passes for 141 yards. After the season was over, the Rams traded Ellison to the Kansas City Chiefs, making room for Lawrence McCutcheon to start for the Rams in 1973. In 1973, Ellison only had 411 yards on 108 carries and in 1974, his final NFL season, Ellison started only two games, with 114 yards on 37 carries. He was only 29 when he retired.

== NFL career statistics ==
Legend
**Bold**	Career high

=== Regular season ===
Year	Team	Games		Rushing					Receiving				
Year	Team	GP	GS	Att	Yds	Avg	Lng	TD	Rec	Yds	Avg	Lng	TD
1967	RAM	14	0	14	84	**6.0**	42	0	1	18	**18.0**	18	0
1968	RAM	14	9	151	616	4.1	52	**5**	20	**248**	12.4	36	**2**
1969	RAM	14	0	20	56	2.8	15	1	4	31	7.8	14	1
1970	RAM	14	4	90	381	4.2	24	**5**	10	84	8.4	20	**2**
1971	RAM	14	13	**211**	**1,000**	4.7	**80**	4	**32**	238	7.4	**49**	0
1972	RAM	13	12	170	764	4.5	37	**5**	23	141	6.1	39	1
1973	KAN	10	7	108	411	3.8	19	2	9	64	7.1	17	0
1974	KAN	5	2	37	114	3.1	11	2	5	64	12.8	26	0
		98	47	801	3,426	4.3	80	24	104	888	8.5	49	6

=== Playoffs ===
Year	Team	Games		Rushing					Receiving				
Year	Team	GP	GS	Att	Yds	Avg	Lng	TD	Rec	Yds	Avg	Lng	TD
1967	RAM	1	0	0	0	0.0	0	0	0	0	0.0	0	0
1969	RAM	1	0	**4**	**22**	**5.5**	**17**	0	0	0	0.0	0	0
		2	0	4	22	5.5	17	0	0	0	0.0	0	0

== Personal life ==
He lived in Pearland, Texas working as a substitute teacher in the Pearland ISD area.

== Death ==
Ellison died in Houston on March 11, 2019, at the age of 73.
