= Rick Cash =

American football player (born 1945)

No. 89, 63, 78
- Positions: Defensive end, Defensive tackle

Personal information
- Born: July 1, 1945 (age 81); St. Louis, Missouri, U.S.
- Listed height: 6 ft 5 in (1.96 m)
- Listed weight: 248 lb (112 kg)

Career information
- High school: Webster Groves (MO)
- College: Missouri (1963); Truman State (1967)
- NFL draft: 1968: 10th round, 260th overall pick

Career history
- Green Bay Packers (1968)*; Atlanta Falcons (1968); Los Angeles Rams (1969–1971); New England Patriots (1972–1973); Philadelphia Bell (1974); San Antonio Wings (1975)
- * Offseason or practice squad member only

Career NFL statistics
- Fumble recoveries: 5
- Sacks: 5
- Stats at Pro Football Reference

Richard Francis Cash (born July 1, 1945) is an American former professional football player who was a defensive lineman in the National Football League (NFL). He played college football for the Northeast Missouri State Bulldogs (now Truman) and was selected in the 10th round selection (260th overall pick) of the 1968 NFL/AFL draft by the Green Bay Packers. Cash would play for the Atlanta Falcons (1968), the Los Angeles Rams (1969–1970), and the New England Patriots (1972–1973).

== College career ==
Cash started his collegiate career at the University of Missouri and switched to Northeast Missouri State University (now Truman State University), where he played tight end and offensive tackle.

== Professional career ==
=== Green Bay Packers ===
Cash was a tenth round draft choice of Green Bay in the 1968 NFL draft. He failed to make the team. He was cut in September 1968.

=== Atlanta Falcons ===
Atlanta signed him off the waiver wire and he played both tackle and defensive end for Falcons in 1968. He ended the season with six tackles (one for a loss).

=== Los Angeles Rams ===
Cash was traded to Los Angeles prior to the 1969 season. He played sparingly, making two tackles. Injuries curtailed his activity in both the 1970 and 1971 seasons. In 1970, he made six tackles (one for a loss). In 1971, he was on injured reserve.

=== New England Patriots ===
Cash went to the Patriots in 1972 (along with the Rams' No. 1 draft choice in the 1973 NFL Draft) in the Fred Dryer trade. He was the Patriots special teams captain in 1972 along with playing right defensive end and right defensive tackle. He ended the season with 95 tackles and no sacks, two passes defensed and a blocked kick. In 1973, he made 92 tackles and sacked the quarterback three times. He played in 28 straight regular season games after joining the Patriots prior to the 1972 season, starting in the last 27.

=== World Football League ===
Rick also played a year in the World Football League for the Philadelphia Bell and the San Antonio Wings.
