= Wendell Tucker =

American football player (born 1943)

No. 14
- Position: Wide receiver

Personal information
- Born: September 4, 1943 (age 83); Philadelphia, Pennsylvania, U.S.
- Listed height: 5 ft 10 in (1.78 m)
- Listed weight: 185 lb (84 kg)

Career information
- High school: Benjamin Franklin (Philadelphia)
- College: South Carolina State
- NFL draft: 1966: undrafted

Career history
- Kansas City Chiefs (1966)*; Los Angeles Rams (1967–1970); Dallas Cowboys (1971)*; Denver Broncos (1971)*; Miami Dolphins (1972)*
- * Offseason or practice squad member only

Career NFL statistics
- Games played: 43
- Receptions: 57
- Receiving yards: 983
- Touchdowns: 11
- Stats at Pro Football Reference

Wendell Edward Tucker (born September 4, 1943) is an American former professional football player who was a wide receiver for the Los Angeles Rams of the National Football League (NFL). He was also a member of the Kansas City Chiefs of the American Football League (AFL). He played college football for the South Carolina State Bulldogs.

== Early life ==
Tucker attended Benjamin Franklin High School. He accepted a football scholarship from South Carolina State University, where he practiced football and track. In 1963, he was forced to interrupt his college career to spend 2 years in military service.

== Professional career ==
=== Kansas City Chiefs ===
Tucker was signed as an undrafted free agent by the Kansas City Chiefs of the Kansas City Chiefs after the 1966 AFL draft. He spent the year in the taxi squad.

=== Los Angeles Rams ===
In 1967, he was signed as a free agent by the Los Angeles Rams of the National Football League. He spent most of his first season on the taxi squad. He appeared in 7 games as a punt return specialist.

In 1968, he was a backup behind starting flanker Bernie Casey. His first meaningful performance came in the eleventh game against the New York Giants, when both Casey and Pat Studstill were injured, he had a 60-yard touchdown reception and would be used as deep threat for the rest of the season, registering a total of 7 catches for 124 yards and 4 touchdowns.

In 1969, he became the starting flanker after Casey's retirement. It would prove to be his most productive season, while playing opposite wide receiver Jack Snow, he caught 38 passes for 629 yards and 7 touchdowns, including a 93 yarder against the San Francisco 49ers for the Coastal Division champion Rams. The next year, he was hampered by injuries and his numbers dropped to 12 receptions for 230 yards in 12 games.

On May 19, 1971, Tucker was traded along with Billy Truax to the Dallas Cowboys in exchange for wide receiver Lance Rentzel. He finished his career with 57 receptions for 983 yards and 11 touchdowns.

=== Dallas Cowboys ===
In 1971, he was unable to regain his trademark speed because of a previous knee injury and was released on August 17.

=== Denver Broncos ===
On August 18, 1971, we was signed as a free agent by the Denver Broncos. He was released before the start of the season.

=== Miami Dolphins ===
On August 1, 1972, he was acquired by the Miami Dolphins, but was later placed on the injured reserve list on September 14.
