= Mike LaHood =

American gridiron football player (1944–2013)

No. 64, 66, 68
- Position: Guard

Personal information
- Born: December 11, 1944; Peoria, Illinois, U.S.
- Died: May 30, 2013 (aged 68); Peoria, Illinois, U.S.
- Listed height: 6 ft 3 in (1.91 m)
- Listed weight: 250 lb (113 kg)

Career information
- High school: Peoria (IL) Spalding Institute
- College: Wyoming
- NFL draft: 1968: 2nd round, 51st overall pick

Career history
- Los Angeles Rams (1969); St. Louis Cardinals (1970); Los Angeles Rams (1971–1972); BC Lions (1973–1974)

Career NFL statistics
- Games played: 51
- Games started: 10
- Fumble recoveries: 1
- Stats at Pro Football Reference

Mike LaHood (December 11, 1944 – May 30, 2013) was an American football guard. He played for the Los Angeles Rams in 1969 and from 1971 to 1972 and for the St. Louis Cardinals in 1970. Mike was born on Dec. 11, 1944, in Peoria to Harry Jerome and Evelyn (Wells) LaHood.

Mike graduated from Spalding High School in 1964 and went on to attend the University of Wyoming in Laramie, Wyo., on a football scholarship. He served his country as a National Guardsman in the fall of 1968. He then went on to play in the NFL from 1969 to 1972 and in the CFL from 1972 to 1974.

Mike returned to Peoria in 1976 and became a laborer for Laborers' Local 165. Mike was later elected as an officer, where he served in multiple capacities and later retired as the business agent in 2001. He was most proud of his work to improve North Central Illinois Laborers' Health and Welfare benefits for his fellow brothers and sisters.

In his retirement years, he enjoyed spending time with his family, especially his grandchildren and his friends. He also enjoyed spending time up at his cabin in Wisconsin.

He died on May 30, 2013, in Peoria, Illinois at age 68.
