= Lance Rentzel =

American football player (1943–2026)

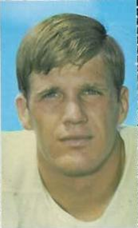
- Rentzel in a 1969 stamp

No. 27, 19, 13
- Positions: Wide receiver, Running back

Personal information
- Born: October 14, 1943; Flushing, New York, U.S.
- Died: June 7, 2026 (aged 82); Alexandria, Virginia, U.S.
- Listed height: 6 ft 2 in (1.88 m)
- Listed weight: 202 lb (92 kg)

Career information
- High school: Casady (Oklahoma City, Oklahoma)
- College: Oklahoma
- NFL draft: 1965: 2nd round, 23rd overall pick
- AFL draft: 1965: 6th round, 48th overall pick

Career history
- Minnesota Vikings (1965–1966); Dallas Cowboys (1967–1970); Los Angeles Rams (1971–1974)

Awards and highlights
- NFL receiving touchdowns leader (1969); Second-team All-Big Eight (1964)

Career NFL statistics
- Receptions: 268
- Receiving yards: 4,826
- Rushing yards: 196
- Return yards: 1,000
- Total touchdowns: 42
- Stats at Pro Football Reference

Thomas Lance Rentzel (October 14, 1943 – June 7, 2026) was an American professional football player who was a flanker in the National Football League (NFL) for 10 seasons. He played college football for the Oklahoma Sooners and was drafted by the Minnesota Vikings in the second round of the 1965 NFL draft. Rentzel also played for the Dallas Cowboys and Los Angeles Rams.

== Early life ==
Rentzel was a four-sport star at Oklahoma City’s exclusive Casady School, playing football, basketball, baseball, and running track. He was an All-American high school halfback and the valedictorian of his graduating class.

== College career ==
Rentzel accepted a football scholarship from the University of Oklahoma under Bud Wilkinson. As a sophomore, he came off the injured list too late and had to hitchhike to Texas to play in the third game against the #2 ranked Longhorns. Rentzel had two long receptions in the game, one for a 34-yard touchdown.

As a junior, Rentzel posted 59 carries for 387 yards (second on the team) with a 6.6-yard average and two touchdowns. He was a versatile all-around halfback and was known for his open-field speed and propensity for big plays rushing, receiving passes, and returning kicks.

As a senior, Rentzel was the team's top pass catcher (268 receiving yards) and punter (40.5-yard average). His 491 rushing yards ranked second on the team. In the Big Eight Conference, Rentzel's 5.4 rushing average was second only to Gale Sayers. Rentzel was also the conference's No. 3 pass receiver, as well as No. 2 punter. He was one of four Sooners players who missed the 1965 Gator Bowl game against Florida State University. Rentzel, offensive lineman Ralph Neely, Jim Grisham, and Wes Skidgel had signed with professional teams before the game and were ruled ineligible for the contest. Florida State won 36–19 on the strength of four touchdown catches by Fred Biletnikoff.

Rentzel graduated in 1965 with a degree in mathematics.

== Professional career ==
=== Minnesota Vikings ===
Rentzel was selected by the Minnesota Vikings in the second round (23rd overall) of the 1965 NFL draft. He was also selected in the sixth round (48th overall) of the 1965 AFL draft by the Buffalo Bills. Rentzel played sparingly as a backup running back due to recurring injuries and his contributions came mainly as a kickoff returner during his first two seasons. Rentzel set the record for the longest kickoff return (101 yards) in franchise history as a rookie, which was broken by Aundrae Allison's 104-yarder in 2007 and Cordarrelle Patterson's 109-yarder in 2013.

In 1966, Rentzel played in only nine games due to ankle injuries. He averaged 20.1 yards on nine kickoff returns and caught two passes for 10 yards.

=== Dallas Cowboys ===
==== 1967 season ====
On May 2, 1967, Rentzel was traded to the Dallas Cowboys in exchange for a third-round draft choice (#76-Mike McGill). Rentzel was converted into a flanker, where he became not only an immediate starter over Pete Gent, but also one of the best wideouts in the NFL. Rentzel led the team in receptions with 58 for 996 yards (two yards less than Bob Hayes). If Rentzel had gotten four more yards and Hayes two more, it would have been the first time in NFL history that a team had two 1,000-yard wide receivers. In the tenth game of the season against the Washington Redskins, Rentzel had 13 receptions for 233 yards. His 13 receptions set a franchise record and stood for 40 years until it was broken by Jason Witten in 2007. The 233 yards were good enough for third on the team at the time (now sixth). Rentzel also starred in the 1967 NFL Championship, known since as the "Ice Bowl", scoring a fourth-quarter, go-ahead touchdown, which was later negated by the Green Bay Packers' game-clinching drive.

==== 1968 and 1969 seasons ====
In 1968, Rentzel led the Cowboys in receptions (54) and receiving yards (1,009) with an 18.7-yard average and five touchdowns. That same year, Rentzel recorded a one-off single, "Lookin' Like Somethin' That Ain't" b/w "Beyond Love" on Columbia Records; the record managed to make the charts at WKY radio in Oklahoma City, but it was not a national hit.

In 1969, Rentzel led the Cowboys in receptions (43), receiving yards (960), and average receiving yards (22.3). He also tied for the NFL lead in touchdowns scored (13) in 1969.

==== 1970 season ====
In 1970, Rentzel was leading the team in receiving yards, when he was arrested for exposing himself to a 10-year-old girl. At the time the accusation was made, the press revealed a nearly forgotten incident that happened when Rentzel was charged with exposing himself to two young girls in St. Paul in September 1966, and pleaded guilty to the reduced charge of disorderly conduct. He was not sentenced to jail, but merely ordered to seek psychiatric care. Because of the nationwide reaction and publicity from the scandal, Rentzel's wife, singer and actress Joey Heatherton, divorced him shortly thereafter. Rentzel asked the Cowboys to place him on the inactive list so that he could devote his time to settling his personal affairs. Rentzel missed the last three games of the regular season, including the Cowboys' playoff drive to its narrow Super Bowl V loss to the Baltimore Colts. He finished the 1970 season with 28 receptions (second on the team) for 556 yards (second on the team) and five touchdowns.

=== Los Angeles Rams ===
On May 19, 1971, Rentzel was traded to the Los Angeles Rams in exchange for tight end Billy Truax and wide receiver Wendell Tucker. After the trade, head coach Tom Landry stated: "We know we are giving up on one of the top flankers in the league, but I thought he would be better off in another city where he had the same opportunity regularly. We found this in Los Angeles, and it was one of the teams Lance wanted to be traded to if he were traded." To replace Rentzel, the Cowboys also obtained Lance Alworth from the San Diego Chargers, in exchange for left tackle Tony Liscio (who retired before reporting to the Chargers, then returned to the Cowboys during the season when starting left tackle Ralph Neely suffered a season-ending injury), tight end Pettis Norman, and defensive tackle Ron East.

Although he spent only four seasons with the Cowboys, Rentzel left as the team's fourth all-time wide receiver in addition to setting other franchise records:

- Most receptions in a game (13 in 1967), which was broken by Jason Witten twice (15 in 2007 and 18 in 2012).
- Most consecutive 100-yard receiving games (three), until Michael Irvin passed him in 1995 with four.
- Still fourth for most receiving touchdowns in a season (12).
- Still fourth for most career postseason receiving yards (242).

Rentzel led the Rams in receptions (38) in 1971, but was never able to regain his previous level of play. In October 1972, he was the subject of a lengthy feature article in Sport Magazine written by Gary Cartwright. That same year, Rentzel wrote When All the Laughter Died in Sorrow, about his professional football experiences and personal life.

In 1973, while on probation for the indecent exposure charge, Rentzel was suspended indefinitely by the NFL at the start of the season for conduct detrimental to the league after being convicted for possession of marijuana. He was reinstated in 1974 after a 10-month suspension.

Rentzel was one of three men credited with inspiring the eccentricities that surround Media Day at the Super Bowl. In January 1975, Sport Magazine editor Dick Schaap hired Rentzel and teammate Fred Dryer to cover Super Bowl IX. Donning costumes inspired by The Front Page, "Cubby O'Switzer" (Rentzel) and "Scoops Brannigan" (Dryer) peppered players and coaches from both the Vikings and Pittsburgh Steelers with questions that ranged from the clichéd to the downright absurd. Rentzel humorously explained, "We're here to ask the dumbest questions we can and to mooch as much food and beer as we possibly can."

=== Retirement ===
On August 27, 1975, Rentzel was placed on waivers, effectively ending his career. After playing in nine NFL seasons, Rentzel accumulated 268 receptions for 4,826 yards and 38 touchdowns to go along with 26 carries for 196 yards and two touchdowns as well as 80 returns for 1,000 yards and a touchdown, a touchdown from a fumble recovery, and a perfect passer rating of 158.3 by completing his lone pass attempt for a 58-yard touchdown.

== Personal life and death ==
In April 1969, Rentzel married Joey Heatherton, an actress, dancer and singer, in New York City. After he was charged with indecent exposure for exposing himself to a 10-year-old girl in November 1970, Heatherton filed for divorce on September 18, 1971. At the time, Rentzel was in New Orleans with the Rams for their season opener. The couple's divorce became final the following year.

Rentzel died in Alexandria, Virginia, on June 7, 2026, at age 82.

== NFL career statistics ==
Legend
	Led the league
**Bold**	Career high

=== Regular season ===
Year	Team	Games		Receiving					Rushing					Returning				
Year	Team	GP	GS	Rec	Yds	Avg	Lng	TD	Att	Yds	Avg	Lng	TD	Ret	Yds	Avg	Lng	TD
1965	MIN	11	1	0	0	0.0	0	0	1	-1	-1.0	-1	0	**27**	**611**	**22.6**	**101T**	**1**
1966	MIN	9	1	2	10	5.0	8	0	0	0	0.0	0	0	20	197	9.9	28	0
1967	DAL	**14**	**14**	**58**	996	17.2	74	8	0	0	0.0	0	0	6	45	7.5	21	0
1968	DAL	**14**	**14**	54	**1,009**	18.7	65	6	0	0	0.0	0	0	14	93	6.6	27	0
1969	DAL	**14**	**14**	43	960	**22.3**	75	**12**	2	11	5.5	14	0	4	14	3.5	11	0
1970	DAL	11	11	28	556	19.9	**86**	5	1	11	**11.0**	11	0	0	0	0.0	0	0
1971	RAM	**14**	**14**	38	534	14.1	41	5	**14**	**113**	8.1	**50**	**1**	9	40	3.5	24	0
1972	RAM	**14**	**14**	27	365	13.5	40	1	7	71	10.1	18	**1**	0	0	0.0	0	0
1973	RAM	0	0	Suspended														
1974	RAM	**14**	0	18	396	22.0	38	1	1	-9	-9.0	-9	0	0	0	0.0	0	0
Career		115	83	268	4,826	18.0	86	38	26	196	7.5	50	2	80	1,000	12.5	101T	1

=== Postseason ===
Year	Team	Games		Receiving					Rushing					Returning				
Year	Team	GP	GS	Rec	Yds	Avg	Lng	TD	Att	Yds	Avg	Lng	TD	Ret	Yds	Avg	Lng	TD
1967	DAL	**2**	**2**	**5**	**126**	**25.2**	**50**	**1**	0	0	0.0	0	0	**1**	**14**	**14.0**	**14**	0
1968	DAL	1	1	3	75	25.0	65	0	0	0	0.0	0	0	0	0	0.0	0	0
1969	DAL	1	1	3	41	13.7	22	**1**	0	0	0.0	0	0	0	0	0.0	0	0
1970	DAL	0	0	DNP														
1973	RAM	0	0	Suspended														
1974	RAM	**2**	0	0	0	0.0	0	0	0	0	0.0	0	0	0	0	0.0	0	0
Career		6	4	11	242	22.0	50	2	0	0	0.0	0	0	1	14	14.0	14	0
