= Jack Teele =

American football executive (1930–2017)

- Teele, c. 1971

Personal information
- Born: June 17, 1930; Bloomington, Illinois, U.S.
- Died: September 14, 2017 (aged 87)

Career information
- High school: Long Beach Polytechnic
- College: Long Beach City College; Cal State, Long Beach

Career history
- Los Angeles Rams (1960–1980); Director of public relations (1960–1968); Assistant to the president (1969–1972); Administrative assistant (1973–1977); Vice president of administration (1978–1980); San Diego Chargers (1981–1990); Assistant to the president (1981–1984); Vice president (1985); Assistant to the president (1986); Director of Administration/assistant to president (1987–1990); Barcelona Dragons (1991–1992); Chief executive officer (1991); General manager (1992)
- Executive profile at Pro Football Reference

Jack Earl Teele (June 17, 1930 – September 14, 2017) was an American football executive and sportswriter. He served as an executive for thirty-one seasons in the National Football League (NFL), including twenty-one with the Los Angeles Rams and ten with the San Diego Chargers, as well as two in the World League of American Football (WLAF) with the Barcelona Dragons.

== Early life and education ==
Jack Teele was born on June 17, 1930, in Bloomington, Illinois. His family moved to Long Beach, California, in 1941. He was one of the first students in the city to attend all levels of education there, having graduated from Garfield Elementary School, Washington Junior High, Long Beach Polytechnic High School, Long Beach City College, and Long Beach State University. He was a member of the Long Beach State men's basketball team as a guard and played in their first-ever season. Teele also played golf.

While attending Long Beach City College in 1949, Teele started a sportswriting career with The Independent. After his graduation from college, he spent two years in the Army Intelligence, including thirteen months in Japan. He returned to the United States in 1954, starting a local sports column in The Independent titled "Sports About Town". From 1958 to 1959, he covered the Los Angeles Rams in the newspaper.

== Executive career ==
=== Los Angeles Rams ===
In 1960, Teele was hired by the Los Angeles Rams as the director of publicity, replacing Bert Rose who became general manager of the Minnesota Vikings.

In the mid-1960s, after being asked repeatedly about the Rams' defensive line, Teele coined the phrase "Fearsome Foursome", to refer to Deacon Jones, Merlin Olsen, Lamar Lundy, and Rosey Grier. He nicknamed them the "Fearsome Foursome", and the name stuck.

In 1967, Teele had helped organize the first Super Bowl, booking the American Football League (AFL) champion Kansas City Chiefs into the Edgewater Hotel in Long Beach. He also secured the team practice space at Veterans Memorial Stadium, the sports field of Long Beach State University.

After serving nine seasons in the position of publicity director, owner Dan Reeves named him assistant to the president, a position that had Teele second in command of the franchise, following the departure of general manager Elroy Hirsch. Although Reeves held the title of general manager, Teele was the team's executive officer. Reeves died prior to the 1971 season and after Carroll Rosenbloom acquired the team the following year, Teele was replaced by Don Klosterman.

Teele was moved to the position of administrative assistant in 1973. In that role, he was in charge of the team's travel, room and food arrangements, and "myriad other details during training camp and the season," according to The Independent. He remained in that position through the 1977 season, before being named vice president of administration in 1978. He served as vice president of administration from 1978 to 1980, before resigning in March 1981. Rich Roberts, writing in the Los Angeles Times, noted that he served with the Rams under three different owners, six head coaches, and "umpteen different quarterbacks" during his twenty-one year stint with the organization.

=== San Diego Chargers ===
Shortly after resigning as Rams vice president of administration, Teele accepted an offer from the San Diego Chargers as assistant to Gene Klein, the team's president and owner. In his tenure with the Chargers, Teele led the team's business, marketing, public relations and ticket offices. By 1985, Teele had become the team's vice president. He was then assistant to the president again in 1986, before becoming Director of Administration by 1987. He helped the Chargers acquire Hank Ilesic in 1989 and the North County Times reported his time "was well spent". He was fired by Chargers owner Alex Spanos in January 1991.

=== Barcelona Dragons ===
After being let go by the Chargers, Teele became the chief executive officer of the Barcelona Dragons, a team in the newly formed World League of American Football (WLAF). He later served as their general manager in 1992 before the league suspended in 1993. He retired after his stint with the Dragons.

== Personal life and death ==
Teele was named Long Beach State's Outstanding Alumnus in 1971 and inducted into the Long Beach City College Hall of Fame in 1975. He was married and had two daughters. After his retirement, he lived for eight years in the San Joaquin Valley on land purchased from Rams coach Hamp Pool. He later lived in Leisure World, Seal Beach. Teele died on September 14, 2017, at the age of 87.
