= Roger Williams (American football) =

American football player (born 1946)

No. 42, 46
- Position: Defensive back

Personal information
- Born: July 1, 1946 (age 80); Jeanerette, Louisiana, U.S.
- Listed height: 5 ft 10 in (1.78 m)
- Listed weight: 180 lb (82 kg)

Career information
- High school: Moley (Jeanerette)
- College: Grambling
- NFL draft: 1969: 13th round, 333rd overall pick

Career history
- Los Angeles Rams (1969–1972); → Indianapolis Capitols (1969); Philadelphia Eagles (1974)*
- * Offseason or practice squad member only

Awards and highlights
- Black college football national champion (1967)
- Stats at Pro Football Reference

Roger J. Williams (born July 1, 1946) is an American former professional football defensive back who played for the Los Angeles Rams of the National Football League (NFL). He played college football for the Grambling Tigers and was selected by the Rams in the 13th round of the 1969 NFL draft.

== Early life ==
Roger J. Williams was born on July 1, 1946, in Jeanerette, Louisiana. He attended Moley High School in Jeanerette.

== College career ==
Williams enrolled at Grambling College to play college football for the Tigers. He was at Gramling from 1965 to 1968. The 1967 Tigers were black college football national co-champions.

== Professional career ==
Williams was selected by the Los Angeles Rams in the 13th round, with the 333rd overall pick, of the 1969 NFL draft. On August 6, 1969, the Rams allocated him to the Indianapolis Capitols of the Continental Football League for the 1969 season. On September 26, it was reported that Williams had been drafted into the U.S. military. He returned to the Rams in 1971. He was waived/injured on August 25, 1971, after having pulled a groin muscle in practice a week earlier. Williams cleared waivers without being claimed by another team, so he reverted to the Rams' injured list. He was signed to the Rams "ready reserve" on September 16, 1971, before the start of the regular season. He appeared in four games as a reserve safety during the 1971 season while returning four kicks for 100 yards and fumbling once. Williams played in all 14 games, starting two, at cornerback for Los Angeles in 1972, returning six kicks for 141 yards. He fumbled during the opening kickoff on October 29, 1972, against the Oakland Raiders. Williams opened the 1973 preseason as the Rams' starting free safety. He was released on August 29, 1973, after the fourth of six preseason games.

Williams signed with the Philadelphia Eagles on December 19, 1973, after the 1973 regular season had ended. On September 12, before the start of the 1974 regular season, it was reported that Williams had been released.
