= Bill Nelson (American football) =

American football player (1948–2010)

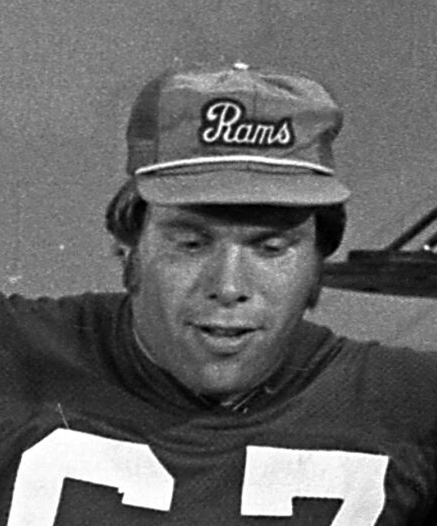
- Nelson in 1975

No. 67
- Position: Defensive tackle

Personal information
- Born: March 9, 1948; Berkeley, California, U.S.
- Died: July 29, 2010 (aged 62)
- Listed height: 6 ft 7 in (2.01 m)
- Listed weight: 270 lb (122 kg)

Career information
- High school: El Centro Union (El Cerrito, California)
- College: Oregon State
- NFL draft: 1970: 7th round, 168th overall pick

Career history
- Los Angeles Rams (1971–1975)

Awards and highlights
- Second-team All-Pac-8 (1969)
- Stats at Pro Football Reference

William Howard Nelson (March 9, 1948 – July 29, 2010) was an American professional football player who was a defensive tackle for the Los Angeles Rams of the National Football League (NFL). He played college football for the Oregon State Beavers.
