= Jim Purnell =

American football player (1941–2003)

No. 53
- Position: Linebacker

Personal information
- Born: December 12, 1941; La Porte, Indiana, U.S.
- Died: November 4, 2003 (aged 61); Evanston, Illinois, U.S.
- Listed height: 6 ft 2 in (1.88 m)
- Listed weight: 229 lb (104 kg)

Career information
- High school: Evanston (Evanston, Illinois)
- College: Wisconsin
- NFL draft: 1964: undrafted

Career history
- Chicago Bears (1964–1968); Los Angeles Rams (1969–1972)

Career NFL statistics
- Fumble recoveries: 9
- Interceptions: 3
- Sacks: 10
- Stats at Pro Football Reference

James Fred Purnell (December 12, 1941 – November 4, 2003) was a National Football League linebacker who played nine seasons.
