= Pat Curran (American football) =

American football player (born 1945)

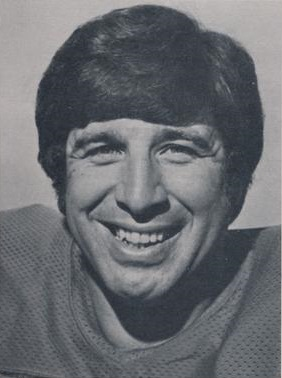
- Curran in 1976

No. 88, 82
- Position: Tight end

Personal information
- Born: September 21, 1945 (age 81); Milwaukee, Wisconsin, U.S.
- Listed height: 6 ft 4 in (1.93 m)
- Listed weight: 238 lb (108 kg)

Career information
- High school: Solomon Juneau (Milwaukee)
- College: Iowa State; Lakeland
- NFL draft: 1969: 6th round, 151st overall pick

Career history

Playing
- Los Angeles Rams (1969–1974); San Diego Chargers (1975–1978)

Coaching
- El Cajon Western (1987)

Career NFL statistics
- Receptions: 106
- Receiving yards: 1,266
- Receiving touchdowns: 5
- Stats at Pro Football Reference

Pat Curran (born September 21, 1945) is an American former professional football player who was a tight end in the National Football League (NFL) for the Los Angeles Rams and San Diego Chargers between 1969 and 1978. In 1969, Pat Summerall while announcing the syndicated NFL Films series This Week in Pro Football dubbed Curran "the meanest man in the NFL" due to Curran's penchant for "spearing" opponents; flying head first and using his helmet to brutally strike into their mid-sections, a type of blocking and tackling technique or maneuver that has since been outlawed in the league.

Curran is a 1964 graduate of Milwaukee's Solomon Juneau High School and a 1968 graduate of Lakeland College near Sheboygan, Wisconsin. He was a two-time NAIA All-American while playing running back at Lakeland and he set a number of school records. Today, he holds Lakeland school records in career, single season and single game scoring and touchdowns, he is #3 in career rushing yards and #4 in single season rushing yards. He is a member of Lakeland's Athletic Hall of Fame.

After retiring as a player, Curran served as a color analyst on Chargers radio broadcasts from 1978 to 1994. He was a manager for El Cajon Western Little League Baseball in 1987 and coached his son Vinny Curran. Curran was elected to the NAIA Hall of Fame in 2013. He is now a sales representative for Snap-On tools, working out of several automotive technical schools.
