= John Pergine =

American football player (born 1946)

No. 52
- Position: Linebacker

Personal information
- Born: September 13, 1946 (age 80); Norristown, Pennsylvania, U.S.
- Listed height: 6 ft 1 in (1.85 m)
- Listed weight: 225 lb (102 kg)

Career information
- High school: Plymouth-Whitemarsh (Plymouth Meeting, Pennsylvania)
- College: Notre Dame (1964-1967)
- NFL draft: 1968: 11th round, 297th overall pick

Career history
- Los Angeles Rams (1969–1972); Washington Redskins (1973–1975)

Awards and highlights
- National champion (1966); Second-team All-American (1967)

Career NFL statistics
- Fumble recoveries: 1
- Receptions: 2
- Receiving yards: 41
- Touchdowns: 1
- Stats at Pro Football Reference

John Samuel Pergine (born September 13, 1946) is an American former professional football player who was a linebacker in the National Football League (NFL) for the Los Angeles Rams and the Washington Redskins. He played college football for the Notre Dame Fighting Irish and was selected in the 11th round of the 1968 NFL/AFL draft. His nine collegiate career interceptions are the most ever by an Notre Dame linebacker.
