= Jim Nettles (American football) =

American gridiron football player (born 1942)

No. 9, 19
- Position: Cornerback

Personal information
- Born: February 15, 1942 (age 84); Muncie, Indiana, U.S.
- Listed height: 5 ft 10 in (1.78 m)
- Listed weight: 177 lb (80 kg)

Career information
- High school: Muncie Central
- College: Wisconsin
- NFL draft: 1965: undrafted

Career history
- Philadelphia Eagles (1965–1968); Los Angeles Rams (1969–1972); Montreal Alouettes (1973)

Career NFL statistics
- Interceptions: 26
- Fumble recoveries: 3
- Touchdowns: 4
- Stats at Pro Football Reference

James Arthur Nettles (born February 15, 1942) is an American former professional football player who was a defensive back for eight seasons in the National Football League with the Philadelphia Eagles and Los Angeles Rams. He played college football for the Wisconsin Badgers.
