= Les Josephson =

American football player (1942–2020)

No. 34
- Position: Running back

Personal information
- Born: July 29, 1942; Minneota, Minnesota, U.S.
- Died: January 1, 2020 (aged 77); Tucson, Arizona, U.S.
- Listed height: 6 ft 1 in (1.85 m)
- Listed weight: 207 lb (94 kg)

Career information
- High school: Minneota
- College: Augustana (SD) (1960–1963)
- NFL draft: 1964: undrafted

Career history
- Dallas Cowboys (1964)*; Los Angeles Rams (1964–1974)
- * Offseason or practice squad member only

Awards and highlights
- Pro Bowl (1967)

Career NFL statistics
- Rushing yards: 3,407
- Rushing average: 4.3
- Receptions: 194
- Receiving yards: 1,970
- Total touchdowns: 28
- Stats at Pro Football Reference

Lester Andrew Josephson (July 29, 1942 – January 1, 2020) was an American professional football player who was a running back for the Los Angeles Rams of the National Football League (NFL). He played college football for the Augustana Vikings in South Dakota.

== Early life ==
Josephson's football career had its start in his high school days in Minneota, Minnesota, where he played 8-man football. He did not play 11-man ball until he enrolled at Augustana University in Sioux Falls, South Dakota.

He was a two-way player at running back and linebacker, receiving Williamson Midbracket All-America honors as a senior. He finished his college career with 1,422 rushing yards and a school record 5.2 yards per carry.

Josephson also practiced track, setting the South Dakota collegiate record in the high jump (6 feet, 5 inches), winning high jump title at the North Central Conference meet and the Howard Wood Dakota Relays in 1963.

In 1980, he was inducted into the Augustana Athletics Hall of Fame. In 1989, he was inducted into the Dakota Relays Hall of Fame.

== Professional career ==
=== Dallas Cowboys ===
Josephson was signed as an undrafted free agent by the Dallas Cowboys after the 1964 NFL draft, because they were impressed with his athletic ability. The Cowboys needed an offensive tackle because of injuries and although they did not want to lose Josephson, he was traded during training camp to the Los Angeles Rams in exchange for offensive tackle Jim Boeke on August 19.

=== Los Angeles Rams ===
In 1964, Josephson joined the backfield of Roman Gabriel as a rookie fullback, where became a team leader for the next decade. He also was given the nickname "blond bull".

He was selected for the Pro Bowl in 1967, after having his best professional season with 800 rushing yards. In the Pro Bowl, he scored a first-quarter touchdown in the 38–20 West victory.

In 1968, he suffered a left calf injury in pre-season, while running through the stadium tunnel to the field. After the cast for the injury was removed, he tore the Achilles tendon of the same leg, while jumping rope during his rehabilitation and was placed on the injured reserve list in October.

Although injuries, including a broken jaw and the ruptured Achilles tendon, slowed him down he still contributed to the team for many years. In 1975, he retired after he was waived during the preseason. At the time, his 3,407 rushing yards were the third highest rushing total in Rams' history.

== Personal life ==
After his football career, he acted in several films and served as a football film consultant. He also was a radio color commentator for the University of Arizona football games. He died on January 1, 2020, at the age of 77.

== Films and television ==
- Technical consultant for Gus (1976)
- Nickelodeon as a bouncer
- Police Woman episode "Death Game" (1977)
- Superdome (1978TV) as Caretta
- Heaven Can Wait (1978) as Owens. Josephson also served as a technical consultant for the film.
