= Roman Gabriel =

American football player (1940–2024)

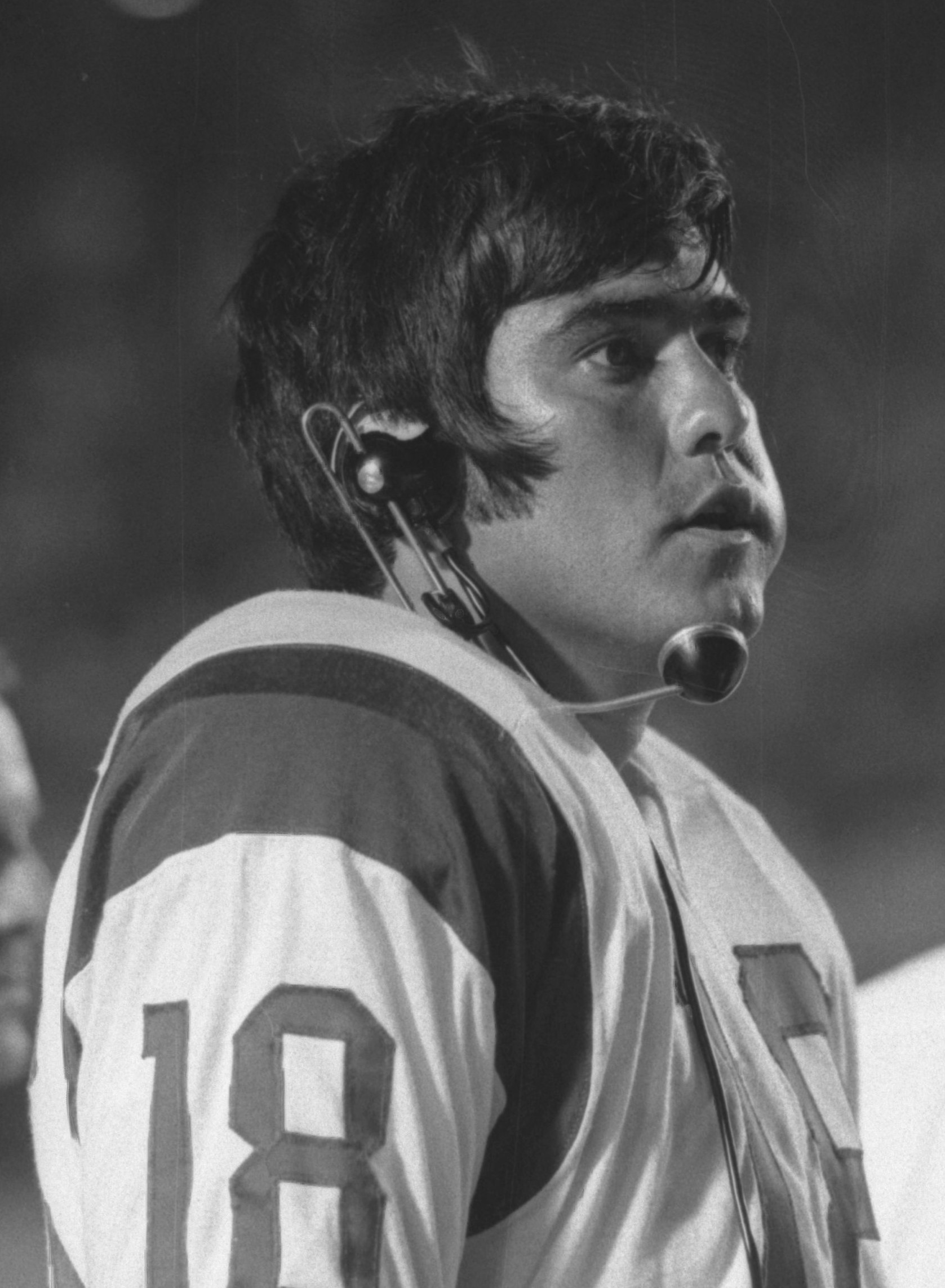
- Gabriel in 1970

No. 18, 5
- Position: Quarterback

Personal information
- Born: August 5, 1940; Wilmington, North Carolina, U.S.
- Died: April 20, 2024 (aged 83); Little River, South Carolina, U.S.
- Listed height: 6 ft 4 in (1.93 m)
- Listed weight: 220 lb (100 kg)

Career information
- High school: New Hanover (Wilmington)
- College: NC State (1959–1961)
- NFL draft: 1962: 1st round, 2nd overall pick
- AFL draft: 1962: 1st round, 1st overall pick

Career history

Playing
- Los Angeles Rams (1962–1972); Philadelphia Eagles (1973–1977)

Coaching
- Cal Poly Pomona (1980–1982) Head coach; Boston Breakers (1983) Offensive coordinator; Raleigh–Durham Skyhawks (1991) Head coach

Awards and highlights
- NFL Most Valuable Player (1969); NFL Comeback Player of the Year (1973); First-team All-Pro (1969); 2× Second-team All-Pro (1967, 1968); 4× Pro Bowl (1967–1969, 1973); NFL passing yards leader (1973); 2× NFL passing touchdowns leader (1969, 1973); 2× First-team All-American (1960, 1961); 2× ACC Player of the Year (1960, 1961); 2× First-team All-ACC (1960, 1961); NC State Wolfpack No. 18 retired

Career NFL statistics
- Passing attempts: 4,498
- Passing completions: 2,366
- Completion percentage: 52.6%
- TD–INT: 201–149
- Passing yards: 29,444
- Passer rating: 74.3
- Rushing yards: 1,304
- Rushing touchdowns: 30
- Stats at Pro Football Reference

Head coaching record
- Career: College: 8–24 (.250); WLAF: 0–10 (.000)
- College Football Hall of Fame

Roman Ildonzo Gabriel Jr. (August 5, 1940 – April 20, 2024) was an American professional football player who was a quarterback in the National Football League (NFL). He played college football for the NC State Wolfpack, earning first-team All-American honors twice. Gabriel was the second overall pick in the 1962 NFL draft and played 11 seasons with the Los Angeles Rams, followed by five seasons with the Philadelphia Eagles. He was notable for being the first Filipino-American quarterback in the NFL and the first and only Asian American to win the NFL Most Valuable Player (MVP) award, which he received in 1969.

== Early life and college ==
Gabriel was born on August 5, 1940, in Wilmington, North Carolina, to Edna Mae Wyatt, an Irish-American woman, and Roman Ildonzo Gabriel Sr., a Filipino immigrant who worked as a railroad waiter and cook. Gabriel grew up poor and suffered from asthma, but he played high school football at New Hanover High School in Wilmington, North Carolina, where he graduated in 1958. He went on to star as quarterback at North Carolina State University in Raleigh, North Carolina.

A two-time All-American and two-time ACC Player of the Year (1960, 1961), Gabriel finished his college career holding virtually every Wolfpack passing record. An academic All-American, Gabriel saw his jersey retired (the first in program history) after his senior season and then presented to him by North Carolina governor Terry Sanford on January 20, 1962, at halftime of an NC State-Maryland basketball game in Reynolds Coliseum. As captain of his team, Gabriel set 22 school and nine conference football records. He threw for 2,961 yards and 19 touchdowns.

Known for his arm strength, he also played baseball and was voted the best amateur athlete in the Carolinas. In a three-year career, he passed for 20 touchdowns and ran for 15. The Atlantic Coast Conference's 50th Anniversary Football Team was announced in 2003 and Gabriel was among the top 50 players in the history of the ACC to be listed. Gabriel was inducted into the College Football Hall of Fame in 1989.

== Professional career ==
Gabriel was the number one 1962 AFL draft pick, chosen by the Oakland Raiders, and he was the second overall pick of the 1962 NFL draft, as selected by the Los Angeles Rams. Gabriel signed with the Rams and went on to a distinguished professional career.

Gabriel wore the number 18 with the Rams and the number 5 with the Philadelphia Eagles. Gabriel played 16 seasons in the NFL, splitting time with the Los Angeles Rams from 1962 to 1972 and then the Philadelphia Eagles from 1973 to 1977. He was awarded the NFL Most Valuable Player Award in 1969 and earned Pro Bowl spots in 1967, 1968, 1969, and 1973. When he retired, he ranked as the Rams' all-time passing leader with 22,223 yards and 154 touchdowns (1,705 completions/3,313 attempts) and threw for 7,221 yards and 45 touchdowns (661 com./1,185 att.) with the Eagles. In 1973, he led the NFL with 3,219 yards and 23 touchdown passes, for which he was awarded the NFL Comeback Player of the Year Award. As of the end of the 2016 NFL season, he still holds the Rams' career records for touchdown passes (154), passes attempted (3,313), and wins by a starting quarterback (74).

=== Los Angeles Rams ===
From 1962 through 1965, Gabriel had a difficult time securing a starting quarterback job. Los Angeles Rams' coaches gave Zeke Bratkowski or Bill Munson the nod over Gabriel. However, due to other quarterbacks slumping or being injured, Gabriel did get to start 23 games from 1962 through 1965. The team's record in those games was 11–11–1. Although his record as a starter was average, the other Rams quarterbacks who started the other 33 games combined record was 4–27–2. Gabriel's significant wins include a 1965 victory to beat the eventual NFL champion Green Bay Packers and the 11–3 Cleveland Browns. In the spring of 1966, Gabriel contemplated leaving the Rams for the Raiders, who offered him a contract for when he would be a free agent after the 1966 season; as recounted by Gabriel, they offered him $300,000 to play three years with a $100,000 signing bonus, which differed from the roughly $22,500 made with Los Angeles.

When George Allen took over for Harland Svare to coach the Rams in 1966, one of his first moves was to try and convince Gabriel to stay with the Rams, as Gabriel had signed the deal that would make him a Raider. Allen convinced Gabriel that he would get him $32,000 but "I'll get you $100,000 when you retire". He then told him to send the bonus check back to the Raiders, which he decided to do with no lasting regret. Allen then made him the primary starter for 1966. Gabriel started all fourteen games and the Rams went 8–6, their first winning season since 1958. In 1967 the Rams went 11–1–2 and made the playoffs as NFL Coastal Division champions. Gabriel was named the AP Offensive Player of the Week the last two weeks of the season. In week 13, needing a win to keep their playoff hopes alive, Gabriel was 20-for-36 with three touchdowns (including the game-winner in the last minute) in a 27–24 come from behind win over the defending champion Green Bay Packers. The next week, in a game against the Baltimore Colts that would decide the division title, Gabriel completed 18-of-22 passes with three touchdowns as the Rams won 34–10. The 1967 Rams finished as the highest-scoring team in the NFL but were eliminated from the playoffs by the Packers 28–7. Gabriel threw for 2,779 yards and 25 touchdowns and was a second-team All-Pro and a Pro Bowler.

The following season, they were in another neck-and-neck battle for the Coastal Division title with the Colts. Going into the thirteenth game of the season, the Rams needed a win to stay within one-half game of the Colts, who would be coming to Los Angeles the following week for the season finale. However, the Rams took a 17–16 loss to the Chicago Bears and soon finished in second place.

In 1969, the Rams opened the season with an 11-game winning streak, which is still a Rams record, before suffering their first loss to the 10–1 Minnesota Vikings in Los Angeles by a score of 20–13. With the division clinched and the undefeated record gone, coach Allen decided to rest many of his starters and the Rams lost their last two games to finish 11–3. In a rematch with the Vikings in the playoffs in Minnesota, the Rams lost, 23–20. For the season, Gabriel threw 24 touchdowns and only seven interceptions and was named the NFL's Most Valuable Player by the AP and NEA, the Player of the Year by the UPI and was voted All-Pro and to the Pro Bowl.

In 1970, the league realigned, putting the Rams in contention with the San Francisco 49ers for the new NFC West Division title. After an upset loss at home to the lowly New York Jets (who were without the injured Joe Namath) in which Gabriel threw three interceptions, the Rams won three straight games, including a crucial 30–13 win over the 49ers to take over first place. Going into the thirteenth week of the season, the Rams participated in the first Monday Night Football game in the city of Los Angeles. However, despite over 300 yards passing from Gabriel, the Rams lost 28–23 to the Detroit Lions, putting the Rams back in 2nd place and left them a half-game behind the Lions for the wild card playoff spot. The Rams won their finale at the New York Giants 31–3 (eliminating the Giants from playoff contention) but failed to make the playoffs as the Lions won to secure the wild card spot, and the 49ers won to clinch the NFC Western Division title. From 1967 to 1970, Gabriel led the Rams to a 41–14–4 overall record and was named to three Pro Bowls during that four-year span.

In 1971, the veteran Rams began to show their age and Gabriel missed parts of every game due to knee and shoulder injuries. In addition, coach George Allen left for the Washington Redskins after a long-running dispute with the Rams general manager Dan Reeves. Still, the Rams, despite playing the league's toughest schedule, faced almost the same situation as in 1970. After falling behind the 49ers in the seventh week of the season, they rallied back to take the division lead going into another matchup in Los Angeles on Monday night for the thirteenth week of the season, for which the matchup was against Washington (now coached by Allen). After falling behind 31–10, Gabriel led the Rams back to within 31–24 and was driving to a possible tying score when he was intercepted; it was returned for a touchdown and the Redskins won. Once again, the Rams fell into second place behind the 49ers and behind the Redskins for the wild card berth. Despite winning in Pittsburgh against the Steelers in the final week of the year, the 49ers came from behind to beat the Lions, 31–27, and win the division.

In 1972, Gabriel's knee and shoulder injury problems deteriorated. After making 89 consecutive starts over eight seasons, he missed two games and lost playing time in all twelve other games. Still, after a Monday night win in San Francisco in the twelfth week, the Rams regained first place. But losses to the St. Louis Cardinals and Detroit Lions in the final two weeks (combined with a previous loss to the woeful Saints), doomed their season. The Rams finished 6–7–1 and coach Tommy Prothro was fired.

=== Philadelphia Eagles ===
After the 1972 season, the Rams hired Chuck Knox as their new coach and obtained John Hadl to be the quarterback. On June 8, 1973, after he threatened to accept a $100,000 contract with the Las Vegas Casinos of the Southwestern Football League in April 1973, Gabriel was traded from the Rams to the Philadelphia Eagles for Harold Jackson, Tony Baker, a 1974 first-round selection (11th overall–John Cappelletti), and first- and third-round picks in 1975 (11th and 67th overall–Dennis Harrah and Dan Nugent) .

Gabriel improved a 2–11–1 Eagles team to a 5–8–1 record. Gabriel was voted to the Pro Bowl for the fourth time and was voted the "Comeback Player of the Year" by Pro Football Weekly. For the 1973 season, Gabriel led the Eagles with 270 completions, 460 attempts, 3,219 yards, and 23 touchdowns (all were league highs) as the Eagle offense was the most prolific passing game in the NFL. Gabriel played through 1977 but his final two years were in a backup role. In his last season, he backed up Ron Jaworski, who had played for the Rams from 1973 to 1976.

In his career, he had a winning record of 86–64–7 and passed for 29,444 yards with 201 touchdowns. He was in the top ten for passing yards (8th), starts (7th), completions (6th), attempts (4th), touchdowns (9th), and sacks (4th) when he retired. He is the only quarterback from his era to still rank high in the "lowest interception percentage" category in NFL passing statistics. The Professional Football Researchers Association named Gabriel to the PFRA Hall of Very Good Class of 2013.

== Coaching career ==
Gabriel was the last football coach at Cal Poly Pomona, where from 1980 to 1982 his teams compiled an 8–24 record. On November 26, 1982, he resigned to become offensive coordinator with the Boston Breakers of the USFL. Cal Poly-Pomona terminated its football program.

Gabriel was head coach of the Raleigh–Durham Skyhawks of the World League of American Football. He was the only coach who did not win a game in the inaugural 1991 season, but came close to beating Jack Elway's 7–3 Frankfurt Galaxy in Germany. The 0–10 Skyhawks disbanded shortly thereafter, the franchise was replaced by Ohio Glory.

== Career statistics ==
=== Playing career ===
Legend
	NFL MVP
	Led the league
**Bold**	Career high

==== Regular season ====
Year	Team	Games			Passing								Rushing			
Year	Team	GP	GS	Record	Cmp	Att	Pct	Yds	Avg	TD	Int	Rtg	Att	Yds	Avg	TD
1962	LA	6	4	0−3−1	57	101	56.4	670	6.6	3	2	78.4	18	93	5.2	0
1963	LA	12	9	5−4	130	281	46.3	1,947	6.9	8	11	62.7	39	132	3.4	3
1964	LA	7	6	3−3	65	143	45.5	1,236	**8.6**	9	5	82.4	11	5	0.5	1
1965	LA	7	4	3−1	83	173	48.0	1,321	7.6	11	5	83.0	23	79	3.4	2
1966	LA	14	14	8−6	217	397	54.7	2,540	6.4	10	16	65.9	**52**	176	3.4	3
1967	LA	14	14	11−1−2	196	371	52.8	2,779	7.5	**25**	13	85.2	43	**198**	4.6	**6**
1968	LA	14	14	10−3−1	184	366	50.3	2,364	6.5	19	**16**	70.0	34	139	4.1	4
1969	LA	14	14	11−3	217	399	54.4	2,549	6.4	24	7	**86.8**	35	156	4.5	5
1970	LA	14	14	9−4−1	211	407	51.8	2,552	6.3	16	12	72.2	28	104	3.7	1
1971	LA	14	14	8−5−1	180	352	51.1	2,238	6.4	17	10	75.4	18	48	2.7	2
1972	LA	14	12	6−6	165	323	51.1	2,027	6.3	12	15	63.8	14	16	1.1	1
1973	PHI	14	14	5−8−1	**270**	**460**	**58.7**	**3,219**	7.0	23	12	86.0	12	10	0.8	1
1974	PHI	11	11	4−7	193	338	57.1	1,867	5.5	9	12	66.8	14	76	**5.4**	0
1975	PHI	11	9	2−7	151	292	51.7	1,644	5.6	13	11	67.8	13	70	**5.4**	1
1976	PHI	4	4	1−3	46	92	50.0	476	5.2	2	2	63.5	4	2	0.5	0
1977	PHI	13	0	—	1	3	33.3	15	5.0	0	0	50.7	–	–	–	–
Career		183	157	86−64−7	2,366	4,498	52.6	29,444	6.5	201	149	74.3	358	1,304	3.6	30

==== Postseason ====
Year	Team	Games			Passing								Rushing			
Year	Team	GP	GS	Record	Cmp	Att	Pct	Yds	Avg	TD	Int	Rtg	Att	Yds	Avg	TD
1967	LA	1	1	0−1	11	31	35.5	186	6.0	1	1	54.0	3	6	2.0	0
1969	LA	1	1	0−1	22	32	68.8	150	4.7	2	1	86.7	4	26	6.5	0
Career		2	2	0−2	33	63	52.4	336	5.3	3	2	70.6	7	32	4.6	0

=== Head coaching record ===
College

Year	Team	Overall	Conference	Standing	Bowl/playoffs
**Cal Poly Pomona Broncos** (California Collegiate Athletic Association) (1980–1981)
1980	Cal Poly Pomona	3–7	0–2	3rd	
1981	Cal Poly Pomona	4–7	1–1	2nd	
**Cal Poly Pomona Broncos** (Western Football Conference) (1982)
1982	Cal Poly Pomona	1–10	1–3	4th	
Cal Poly Pomona:		8–24	2–6		
Total:		8–24			

== Awards and honors ==
NFL

- NFL Most Valuable Player (1969)
- NFL Comeback Player of the Year (1973)
- First-team All-Pro (1969)
- 2× Second-team All-Pro (1967, 1968)
- 4× Pro Bowl (1967–1969, 1973)
- Pro Bowl MVP (1968)
- NFL passing yards leader (1973)
- 2× NFL passing touchdowns leader (1969, 1973)

College

- 2× First-team All-American (1960, 1961)
- 2× ACC Player of the Year (1960, 1961)
- 2× First-team All-ACC (1960, 1961)
- NC State Wolfpack No. 18 retired
- College Football Hall of Fame (1989)

== Broadcasting career ==
Gabriel also had a career as a broadcast color commentator, calling games on CBS television from 1978 to 1979, on CBS Radio in the 1980s and on Carolina Panthers radio from 1995 to 2001.

== Acting career ==
Gabriel was a frequent guest on television talk shows of the era, including The Merv Griffin Show, The Virginia Graham Show, The Rosey Grier Show, and The Joey Bishop Show.

Gabriel had a brief film career, playing a prison guard in Otto Preminger's 1968 spoof Skidoo and a Native American named "Blue Boy" in the 1969 John Wayne and Rock Hudson film The Undefeated. He had previously appeared as a headhunter in the November 14, 1966, "Topsy-Turvey" episode of CBS' Gilligan's Island. With several of his Rams teammates, he made a cameo appearance as a football player in the 1965 Perry Mason episode, "The Case of the 12th Wildcat", as well as in 1970 on an Ironside episode, "Blackout". He appeared twice on Rowan & Martin's Laugh-In. He was also on a 1978 episode of Wonder Woman, "The Deadly Sting".

== Death ==
On April 20, 2024, Gabriel died peacefully at home in Little River, South Carolina, at the age of 83.

== See also ==
- List of most consecutive starts by an NFL quarterback
