= 1969 NFL season =

American football season

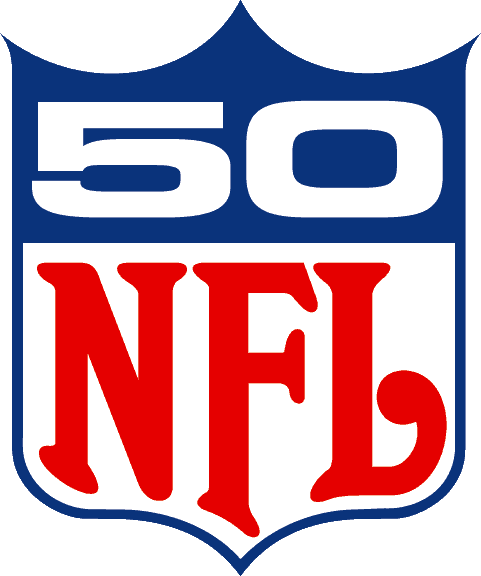
- Anniversary logo for the NFL's 50th season

Regular season
- Duration: September 21 – December 21, 1969

Playoffs
- East Champions: Cleveland Browns
- West Champions: Minnesota Vikings

Championship Game
- Champions: Minnesota Vikings

NFL teams: Coastal, Central, Century, Capitol

The 1969 NFL season was the 50th regular season of the National Football League, and its last before the AFL–NFL merger. To honor the NFL's fiftieth season, a special anniversary logo was designed and each player wore a patch on their jerseys with this logo throughout the season.

Per the agreement made during the 1967 season, the New Orleans Saints and the New York Giants switched divisions again, returning to the 1967 alignment.

The season ended when the Minnesota Vikings defeated the Cleveland Browns in the NFL championship game, earning the right to face the American Football League's champion Kansas City Chiefs in Super Bowl IV at Tulane Stadium in New Orleans. This was the last awarding of the Ed Thorp Memorial Trophy to the NFL champion; it was introduced 35 years earlier in 1934.

As was the case the previous season, the NFL champion was not crowned as the "world champion" because of the Vikings' 23–7 loss to the Chiefs in the Super Bowl. This occurrence can no longer happen, as the AFL and the NFL completed their merger the following season (1970), realigned into two 13-team conferences (AFC, NFC) in one league (the NFL), with the conference champions meeting in the Super Bowl. This was also the final season, until 2006, that "The Duke" football was used.

== Draft ==
The 1969 NFL/AFL draft was held January 28–29 at New York City's Belmont Plaza Hotel. With the first pick, the Buffalo Bills selected running back O. J. Simpson from the University of Southern California, the winner of the Heisman Trophy.

== Deaths ==
- January 19 - Warren Lahr, age 45. Drafted by the Pittsburgh Steelers in the 1947 NFL draft. Spurned the NFL to play Defensive Back for the Cleveland Browns of the AAFC.
- October 14 - Arnie Herber, age 59. Quarterback for the Green Bay Packers. Led the Packers to four NFL Championships, member of the NFL's all-decade team for the 1930's. Elected to the Pro Football Hall Of Fame in 1966.

== Division races ==
Like the previous two seasons, the Eastern Conference was split into the Capitol and Century Divisions, and the Western Conference had the Coastal and Central Divisions. From 1933 through 1966, if two teams were tied for the division lead at season's end, an unscheduled tiebreaker playoff was conducted. Starting in 1967, a tiebreaking system was implemented in which head-to-head record, then net points in head-to-head competition, followed by the team that had less recently played in a title game were the tiebreakers. As such, only one team in a division would be the division winner, even if the won-lost record was the same (This tiebreaker was only needed once in the three years it was in existence, when in 1967 the Rams and Colts tied for the Coastal Division title (and best record in the league) but the Rams advanced to the playoffs based on their 1–0–1 record vs. the Colts.).

The 1969 division races were largely uneventful. All four division winners assumed first place by week five and never relinquished it. The closest races were in the Central and Coastal, where the Vikings and Rams won their divisions by 2½ games, but the Rams had clinched with four games to play and the Vikings with three games to play. As home field in playoffs was rotated and not determined by a teams' record at that time, the division winners had nothing to play for and the last month of the season was uneventful, save for the Rams' quest for a perfect record, which ended in L.A. in a week 12 loss to the Vikings, 20–13.

The other story of note was Vince Lombardi's return to coaching, taking over the Washington Redskins after a one-year hiatus in Green Bay; he led the Redskins to a 7–5–2 finish, their first winning record in fifteen years. It was his only season in Washington, as he died of cancer the following September.

Week	Capitol		Century		Coastal		Central	
1	Washington*	1–0–0	Pittsburgh*	1–0–0	Atlanta*	1–0–0	Green Bay	1–0–0
2	Dallas	2–0–0	Cleveland	2–0–0	Los Angeles	2–0–0	Green Bay	2–0–0
3	Dallas	3–0–0	St. Louis*	2–1–0	Los Angeles	3–0–0	Minnesota*	2–1–0
4	Dallas	4–0–0	N.Y. Giants*	3–1–0	Los Angeles	4–0–0	Minnesota*	3–1–0
5	Dallas	5–0–0	Cleveland	4–1–0	Los Angeles	5–0–0	Minnesota*	4–1–0
6	Dallas	6–0–0	Cleveland	4–1–1	Los Angeles	6–0–0	Minnesota	5–1–0
7	Dallas	6–1–0	Cleveland	5–1–1	Los Angeles	7–0–0	Minnesota	6–1–0
8	Dallas	7–1–0	Cleveland	5–2–1	Los Angeles	8–0–0	Minnesota	7–1–0
9	Dallas	8–1–0	Cleveland	6–2–1	Los Angeles	9–0–0	Minnesota	8–1–0
10	Dallas	8–2–0	Cleveland	7–2–1	Los Angeles	10–0–0	Minnesota	9–1–0
11	Dallas	8–2–1	Cleveland	8–2–1	Los Angeles	11–0–0	Minnesota	10–1–0
12	Dallas	9–2–1	Cleveland	9–2–1	Los Angeles	11–1–0	Minnesota	11–1–0
13	Dallas	10–2–1	Cleveland	10–2–1	Los Angeles	11–2–0	Minnesota	12–1–0
14	Dallas	11–2–1	Cleveland	10–3–1	Los Angeles	11–3–0	Minnesota	12–2–0

*indicates more than one team with record

== Final standings ==
Eastern Conference

NFL Capitol
	W	L	T	PCT	DIV	CONF	PF	PA	STK
Dallas Cowboys	11	2	1	.846	6–0	9–1	369	223	W3
Washington Redskins	7	5	2	.583	3–2–1	6–3–1	307	319	L1
New Orleans Saints	5	9	0	.357	1–5	4–6	311	393	W1
Philadelphia Eagles	4	9	1	.308	1–4–1	4–5–1	279	377	L4

NFL Century
	W	L	T	PCT	DIV	CONF	PF	PA	STK
Cleveland Browns	10	3	1	.769	4–1–1	8–1–1	351	300	L1
New York Giants	6	8	0	.429	4–2	4–6	264	298	W3
St. Louis Cardinals	4	9	1	.308	3–2–1	3–6–1	314	389	L3
Pittsburgh Steelers	1	13	0	.071	0–6	0–10	218	404	L13

Note: Tie games were not officially counted in the standings until 1972.

Western Conference

NFL Coastal
	W	L	T	PCT	DIV	CONF	PF	PA	STK
Los Angeles Rams	11	3	0	.786	5–1	7–3	320	243	L3
Baltimore Colts	8	5	1	.615	3–3	5–4–1	279	268	W1
Atlanta Falcons	6	8	0	.429	2–4	4–6	276	268	W3
San Francisco 49ers	4	8	2	.333	2–4	3–7	277	319	W1

NFL Central
	W	L	T	PCT	DIV	CONF	PF	PA	STK
Minnesota Vikings	12	2	0	.857	6–0	9–1	379	133	L1
Detroit Lions	9	4	1	.692	3–3	6–3–1	259	188	W2
Green Bay Packers	8	6	0	.571	3–3	5–5	269	221	W2
Chicago Bears	1	13	0	.071	0–6	0–10	210	339	L6

== Postseason ==
=== NFL playoffs ===
Conference championship games
December 28 – Cotton Bowl
Cleveland Browns (10–3–1)	38
Dallas Cowboys (11–2–1)	14
December 27 – Metropolitan Stadium
Los Angeles Rams (11–3)	20
Minnesota Vikings (12–2)	23

NFL Championship Game
January 4, 1970 – Metropolitan Stadium
Cleveland Browns	7
Minnesota Vikings	27

In the Eastern Conference championship game, the Cleveland Browns and Dallas Cowboys met for the third straight year. The Cowboys had won in 1967 in Dallas and the Browns in 1968 in Cleveland; this was the rubber match before the Browns would move to the American Conference in the 1970 merger/realignment. The Cowboys were favored, as they featured the best offense in the NFL, a better record than Cleveland, and were at home. However, the Browns jumped on the Cowboys early and often in cruising to a surprising 38–14 win at the Cotton Bowl.

In the Western Conference, the Vikings were four-point favorites over the Rams in Minnesota. Three weeks earlier, the Vikings (10–1) met the Rams (11–0) in Los Angeles and won, 20–13. This time, the Rams broke out on top and led 17–7 at halftime. After the Vikings scored to make it 17–14, the Rams settled for another short field goal (both Ram field goals came when they could not get a touchdown from inside the 5 yard line; this would ultimately cost them the game) to make it 20–14. Joe Kapp led the Vikings to the go ahead touchdown early in the 4th quarter, helped by a controversial penalty on Rams defender Jim Nettles. Viking receiver John Henderson caught a pass and ran to the Rams 20 yard line where he was tripped up by Eddie Meador. Not sure if the defender made contact and not hearing a whistle, Henderson got up and starting running; Nettles then tackled him and was called for unnecessary roughness. Nettles claimed he never heard a whistle and asked "what was I supposed to do, stand there and watch him run into the end zone?!" With the ball moved inside the ten-yard line, Kapp eventually put the Vikings ahead 21–20 with a short touchdown run. Shortly thereafter, Vikings DE Carl Eller sacked Ram QB Roman Gabriel in the end zone to make it 23–20. The Rams forced a Viking punt and began driving for a potential tying field goal or go ahead touchdown but Gabriel was intercepted by Alan Page at the 45-yard line with under two minutes to play to clinch the win. After starting the season with eleven consecutive victories, the Rams lost all four games in December; they won the last edition of the third place Playoff Bowl, shutting out Dallas 31–0 on January 3 in Miami.

In the NFL final in Minnesota on January 4, the Browns were thoroughly dominated for the second year in a row. In 1968, the Colts beat them 34–0 in Cleveland; in this game the Vikings won 27–7, completely shutting down the Browns offense while Minnesota gained nearly 200 rushing yards.

=== Playoff Bowl ===
The Playoff Bowl was between the conference runners-up for third place in the league. The game, in its tenth and final year, was played one day before the title game.

- Los Angeles 31, Dallas 0 at Orange Bowl, Miami, Florida, January 7, 1968

=== Super Bowl ===
The Kansas City Chiefs, league champion of the 1969 American Football League season, defeated the Minnesota Vikings, 23–7, at Tulane Stadium in New Orleans, on January 11, 1970.

== Awards ==
Most Valuable Player	Roman Gabriel, quarterback, L.A. Rams
Coach of the Year	Bud Grant, Minnesota
Offensive Rookie of the Year	Calvin Hill, running back, Dallas
Defensive Rookie of the Year	Joe Greene, defensive tackle, Pittsburgh

== Coaching changes ==
- Pittsburgh Steelers: Bill Austin was replaced by Chuck Noll.
- New York Giants: Allie Sherman was replaced by Alex Webster.
- Philadelphia Eagles: Joe Kuharich was replaced by Jerry Williams.
- Washington Redskins: Otto Graham was replaced by Vince Lombardi.

== Stadium changes ==
- The Philadelphia Eagles became the first NFL team to play its home games on artificial turf, installed at Franklin Field.
- The home of the Washington Redskins, D.C. Stadium, was renamed Robert F. Kennedy (RFK) Memorial Stadium in memory of former U.S. Attorney General and U.S. Senator Robert F. Kennedy.

== See also ==
- 1969 American Football League season
