= 1966 Los Angeles Rams season =

NFL team season

- Owner: Dan Reeves
- Head coach: George Allen
- Home stadium: Los Angeles Memorial Coliseum

Results
- Record: 8–6
- Division place: 3rd NFL Western
- Playoffs: Did not qualify
- All-Pros: DE Deacon Jones, DT Merlin Olsen
- Pro Bowlers: FB Dick Bass, LB Maxie Baughan, K Bruce Gossett, DE Deacon Jones, TE Marlin McKeever, FS Eddie Meador, DT Merlin Olsen

The 1966 Los Angeles Rams season was the team's 29th year with the National Football League and the 21st season in Los Angeles.

The Rams had an 8–6 record, their first winning season since 1958, and only their second since 1955, when the Rams went all the way to the NFL Championship Game. Los Angeles finished in third place in the Western Conference, four games behind the Green Bay Packers. The Rams were led by first-year head coach George Allen, who was inducted in the Pro Football Hall of Fame in 2002.

== Offseason ==
=== NFL draft ===
1966 Los Angeles Rams draft
| Round | Pick | Player | Position | College | Notes |
| 1 | 2 | Tom Mack * ^{†} | Guard | Michigan | |
| 2 | 18 | Mike Garrett * | Running back | USC | |
| 3 | 34 | Dick Tyson | Guard | Tulsa | |
| 4 | 50 | Henry Dyer | Running back | Grambling | |
| 5 | 66 | Diron Talbert * | Defensive tackle | Texas | |
| 5 | 77 | Dick Arndt | Defensive tackle | Idaho | |
| 6 | 82 | Bruce Anderson | Defensive end | Willamette | |
| 7 | 97 | George Youngblood | Cornerback | Cal State Los Angeles | |
| 8 | 112 | Vilnis Ezerins | Running back | Whitewater State | |
Made roster † Pro Football Hall of Fame * Made at least one Pro Bowl during career

== Roster ==
1966 Los Angeles Rams roster
| Quarterbacks (QB): 18 Roman Gabriel; 19 Bill Munson; Running backs (RB): 22 Dick Bass; 43 Les Josephson; 25 Tom Moore; 26 Jim Stiger; Wide receivers (WR): 20 Steve Heckard; 29 Tommy McDonald; 80 Bucky Pope; 84 Jack Snow; Tight ends (TE): 86 Marlin McKeever; 87 Billy Truax | Offensive linemen (OL): 63 Joe Carollo T; 62 Don Chuy G; 73 Charley Cowan T; 50 Ken Iman C; 65 Tom Mack G; 77 Bob Nichols T; 71 Joe Scibelli G; 54 Joe Wendryhoski C; Defensive linemen (DL): 76 Rosey Grier DT; 75 Deacon Jones DE; 72 Earl Leggett DT/DE; 85 Lamar Lundy DE; 74 Merlin Olsen DT | Linebackers (LB): 55 Maxie Baughan OLB; 58 Dan Currie OLB; 32 Jack Pardee OLB; 66 Myron Pottios MLB; 61 Bill George MLB; 57 Doug Woodlief OLB; Defensive backs (DB): 49 Claude Crabb SS; 27 Irv Cross CB; 44 Chuck Lamson SS; 21 Eddie Meador FS; 46 Hank Gremminger FS; 24 Clancy Williams CB; 45 George Youngblood CB; Special teams (ST): 30 Bruce Gossett K; 13 Jon Kilgore P | Practice squad: 61 Billy Anderson QB; 79 Bruce Anderson DE; -- Willie Brown WR; 51 George Burman C; -- Mike Capshaw T; 37 Vilnis Ezerins RB; 17 Danny McIlhany CB; -- Dennis Murphy DT; 83 Dave Pivec TE; -- David Ray K/P; 81 Gregg Schumacher DE; 36 Ben Wilson RB; 47 Kelton Winston S; Reserve: 43 Mike Dennis RB (IR); 35 Henry Dyer RB (IR); 88 Tony Guillory LB (IR); Rookies in italics |

== Regular season ==
=== Schedule ===
| Week | Date | Opponent | Result | Record | Venue | Attendance |
|---|---|---|---|---|---|---|
| 1 | September 11 | at Atlanta Falcons | **W** 19–14 | 1–0 | Atlanta Stadium | 54,418 |
| 2 | September 16 | **Chicago Bears** | **W** 31–17 | 2–0 | Los Angeles Memorial Coliseum | 58,916 |
| 3 | September 25 | at **Green Bay Packers** | **L** 13–24 | 2–1 | Lambeau Field | 50,861 |
| 4 | September 30 | **San Francisco 49ers** | **W** 34–3 | 3–1 | Los Angeles Memorial Coliseum | 45,642 |
| 5 | October 9 | at **Detroit Lions** | **W** 14–7 | 4–1 | Tiger Stadium | 52,793 |
| 6 | October 16 | at **Minnesota Vikings** | **L** 7–35 | 4–2 | Metropolitan Stadium | 47,426 |
| 7 | October 23 | at **Chicago Bears** | **L** 10–17 | 4–3 | Wrigley Field | 47,475 |
| 8 | October 30 | **Baltimore Colts** | **L** 3–17 | 4–4 | Los Angeles Memorial Coliseum | 57,898 |
| 9 | November 6 | at **San Francisco 49ers** | **L** 13–21 | 4–5 | Kezar Stadium | 35,372 |
| 10 | November 13 | New York Giants | **W** 55–14 | 5–5 | Los Angeles Memorial Coliseum | 34,746 |
| 11 | November 20 | **Minnesota Vikings** | **W** 21–6 | 6–5 | Los Angeles Memorial Coliseum | 38,775 |
| 12 | November 27 | at **Baltimore Colts** | **W** 23–7 | 7–5 | Memorial Stadium | 60,238 |
| 13 | December 4 | **Detroit Lions** | **W** 23–3 | 8–5 | Los Angeles Memorial Coliseum | 40,039 |
| 14 | Bye | | | | | |
| 15 | December 18 | **Green Bay Packers** | **L** 23–27 | 8–6 | Los Angeles Memorial Coliseum | 72,416 |
Note: Intra-conference opponents are in **bold** text.

- A bye week was necessary in 1966, as the league expanded to an odd-number (15) of teams (Atlanta); one team was idle each week.

=== Game summaries ===
==== Week 1 at Atlanta Falcons ====
Week One: Los Angeles Rams (0–0) at Atlanta Falcons (0–0)

| Quarter | 1 | 2 | 3 | 4 | Total |
|---|---|---|---|---|---|
| Rams | 3 | 13 | 3 | 0 | **19** |
| Falcons | 0 | 7 | 7 | 0 | **14** |

at Atlanta Stadium, Atlanta

- Date: September 11
- Game weather: 71 °F (22 °C)
- Box Score

Game information

**First quarter**

- Los Angeles – Bruce Gossett 15-yard field goal, Rams 7–0.

**Second quarter**

- Los Angeles – Jack Snow) 51-yard pass from Roman Gabriel (Gossett kick), Rams 10–0.
- Los Angeles – Bruce Gossett 15-yard field goal, Rams 13–0.
- Los Angeles – Bruce Gossett 23-yard field goal, Rams 16–0.
- Atlanta – Gary Barnes 53-yard pass from Randy Johnson (Traynham kick), Rams 16–7.

**Third quarter**

- Atlanta – Randy Johnson 3-yard rush (Traynham kick), Rams 16–14.
- Los Angeles – Bruce Gossett 22-yard field goal, Rams 19–7.

**Fourth quarter**

**Top Passers**

- Rams – Roman Gabriel: 21/35, 294 yds, 1 TD, 1 INT
- Falcons – Randy Johnson: 9/25, 154 yds, 1 TD, 2 INT

**Top rushers**

- Rams – Dick Bass: 14 car, 81 yds.
- Falcons – Ernie Wheelwright: 6 car, 91 yds,

**Top receivers**

- Rams– Tommy McDonald: 9 rec, 114 yds
- Falcons – Gary Barnes: 1 rec, 53 yds 1 TD

==== Week 10 vs New York Giants ====
Week Ten: Los Angeles Rams (4-5) vs New York Giants (1-6-1)

| Quarter | 1 | 2 | 3 | 4 | Total |
|---|---|---|---|---|---|
| Giants | 0 | 7 | 0 | 7 | **14** |
| Rams | 14 | 10 | 10 | 21 | **55** |

at Los Angeles Memorial Coliseum, Los Angeles

- Date: November 13
- Game weather: 62 °F (17 °C)
- Box Score

Game information

**First quarter**

- Los Angeles – Tom Moore 11-yard pass from Roman Gabriel (Gossett kick), Rams 7–0.
- Los Angeles – Roman Gabriel 1-yard rush (Gossett kick), Rams 14–0.

**Second quarter**

- New York – Henry Carr 101-yard interception return (Gogolak kick), Rams 14–7.
- Los Angeles – Bruce Gossett 12-yard field goal, Rams 17–7.
- Los Angeles – Roman Gabriel 1-yard rush (Gossett kick), Rams 24–7.

**Third quarter**

- Los Angeles – Bruce Gossett 15-yard field goal, Rams 27–7.
- Los Angeles – Irv Cross 60-yard interception return (Gossett kick, Rams 34–7.

**Fourth quarter**

- Los Angeles – Tom Moore 4-yard pass from Roman Gabriel (Gossett kick), Rams 41–7.
- New York – Joe Morrison 25-yard pass from Tom Kennedy (Gogolak kick), Rams 41–14.
- Los Angeles – Les Josephson 4-yard pass from Bill Munson (Gossett kick), Rams 48–14.
- Los Angeles – Bucky Pope 14-yard pass from Bill Munson (Gossett kick), Rams 55–14.

**Top Passers**

- Giants – Tom Kennedy: 8/18, 126 yds, 1 TD, 2 INT
- Rams – Roman Gabriel: 24/35, 298 yds, 2 TD, 1 INT

**Top rushers**

- Giants – Allen Jacobs: 5 car, 20 yds,
- Rams – Dick Bass: 19 car, 106 yds.

**Top receivers**

- Giants – Joe Morrison: 4 rec, 71 yds 1 TD
- Rams– Marlin McKeever: 7 rec, 115 yds

== Standings ==
NFL Western Conference
| | W | L | T | PCT | CONF | PF | PA | STK |
|---|---|---|---|---|---|---|---|---|
| Green Bay Packers | 12 | 2 | 0 | .857 | 10–2 | 335 | 163 | W5 |
| Baltimore Colts | 9 | 5 | 0 | .643 | 7–5 | 314 | 226 | W1 |
| Los Angeles Rams | 8 | 6 | 0 | .571 | 6–6 | 289 | 212 | L1 |
| San Francisco 49ers | 6 | 6 | 2 | .500 | 5–5–2 | 320 | 325 | L1 |
| Chicago Bears | 5 | 7 | 2 | .417 | 4–6–2 | 234 | 272 | W1 |
| Detroit Lions | 4 | 9 | 1 | .308 | 3–8–1 | 206 | 317 | L3 |
| Minnesota Vikings | 4 | 9 | 1 | .308 | 4–7–1 | 292 | 304 | L1 |

Note: Tie games were not officially counted in the standings until 1972.
