= 1968 Los Angeles Rams season =

NFL team season

- General manager: Elroy Hirsch
- Head coach: George Allen
- Home stadium: Los Angeles Memorial Coliseum

Results
- Record: 10–3–1
- Division place: 2nd Western Coastal
- Playoffs: Did not qualify

The 1968 Los Angeles Rams season was the team's 31st year with the National Football League and the 23rd season in Los Angeles. The season saw the Rams attempting to improve on their 11-1-2 record from 1967 and qualifying for the playoffs for the second straight season. The Rams started off by winning their first six games before losing to the Baltimore Colts for their first loss. After 2 more victories, the Rams tied the San Francisco 49ers. They rebounded by winning their next 2 games and were in firm control of their playoff hopes. However, 2 close losses to the Chicago Bears and Baltimore Colts at home dampened their playoff hopes, and they barely missed the playoffs as a result.

== Offseason ==
=== Draft ===
1968 Los Angeles Rams draft
| Round | Pick | Player | Position | College | Notes |
| 2 | 30 | Gary Beban | Quarterback | UCLA | |
| 2 | 51 | Mike LaHood | Guard | Wyoming | |
| 5 | 135 | Don Martin | Kicker | Washington | |
Made roster † Pro Football Hall of Fame * Made at least one Pro Bowl during career

== Personnel ==
=== Staff / Coaches ===
1968 Los Angeles Rams staff
| Front Office: Owner – Dan Reeves; General manager – Elroy Hirsch; Coaching Staff: Head coach - George Allen; Offensive Coaches: Offensive Coordinator / Offensive Line - Ray Procshaska; Offensive Backs - Ted Marchibroda; Receivers - Howard Schnellenberger | Defensive Coaches: Defensive Line - Marion Campbell; Linebackers - Tom Catlin; Special Teams Coaches: None - N/A; Strength and Conditioning: None - N/A |

=== Roster ===
1968 Los Angeles Rams roster
| Quarterbacks (QB): 18 Roman Gabriel; 16 Milt Plum; Running backs (RB): 22 Dick Bass; 43 Mike Dennis; 33 Willie Ellison; 37 Vilnis Ezerins; 20 Tommy Mason; Wide receivers (WR): 25 Bernie Casey; 29 Harold Jackson; 84 Jack Snow; 28 Pat Studstill P; 14 Wendell Tucker; Tight ends (TE): 83 Dave Pivec; 87 Billy Truax | Offensive linemen (OL): 63 Joe Carollo T; 62 Don Chuy G; 73 Charley Cowan T; 50 Ken Iman C; 65 Tom Mack G; 56 Frank Marchlewski C; 71 Joe Scibelli G; 77 Jim Wilson T; Defensive linemen (DL): 79 Coy Bacon DE; 78 Roger Brown DT; 75 Deacon Jones DE; 74 Merlin Olsen DT; 81 Gregg Schumacher DE; 72 Diron Talbert DT | Linebackers (LB): 55 Maxie Baughan OLB; 56 Dean Halverson OLB; 32 Jack Pardee OLB; 66 Myron Pottios MLB; 57 Doug Woodlief MLB; Defensive backs (DB): 49 Claude Crabb SS; 27 Irv Cross CB; 46 Willie Daniel CB; 21 Eddie Meador FS; 41 Ron Smith SS; 24 Clancy Williams CB; Special teams (ST): 30 Bruce Gossett K | Practice squad: Billy Anderson QB; Ron Berger DE; Gene Breen LB; Cephus Jackson S; Kent Kramer TE; John Pergine LB; Jimmy Raye DB; Tom Watkins RB; Bobby Webb C; Reserve: 51 George Burman C (IR); 70 Dave Cahill DT (IR); 35 Henry Dyer RB (IR); 88 Tony Guillory LB (IR); 31 Jeff Jordan RB (IR); 34 Les Josephson RB (IR); -- Mike LaHood G (Military); 44 Chuck Lamson S (IR); 85 Lamar Lundy DE (IR); -- Don Martin K (Military); -- Bob Sanders LB (IR); -- Nate Shaw S (Military); 47 Kelton Winston S (IR); Rookies in italics |

== Season Recap ==
Just as they had in 1967, the Rams and Colts staged a season long battle for the Coastal Division title. The Rams won their first six games, but lost to the Colts in Baltimore in week seven, 27-10, to fall into a tie with the Colts. Both teams won their next two games, but then the Rams had to rally from a 10-point 4th quarter deficit to tie the 49ers in San Francisco, 20-20.

Going into the second to the last game of the season against the Bears, the Rams trailed the Colts by 1/2 game, with a regular season finale vs. the Colts in Los Angeles looming the following week to decide the title. The Colts won a Saturday game in Green Bay (eliminating the Packers from playoff contention) 16-3. On Sunday, the Bears, the breaks, and the officials all played a role in the Bears 17–16 win that eliminated the Rams. The Bears played inspired defense, even knocking quarterback Roman Gabriel out of the game for a time. The Rams blocked a Bears punt, but it rolled out of the end zone for a safety just before the Rams were about to recover the ball in the end zone for a touchdown. Finally, trailing by a point, Gabriel rallied the Rams and appeared to pass them into field goal range. But a late flag for clipping cost the Rams the gain and set them back 15 yards into their own territory. At the same time, the officials neglected to re-set the down marker back to 3rd down (the down is supposed to go over on a penalty), so when the next play was an incomplete pass, the officials awarded the Bears the ball. The Rams protested vehemently that it was still their ball down but to no avail. The NFL later acknowledged the officials' mistake but said the result of the game could not be changed.

== Schedule ==
| Week | Date | Opponent | Result | Record | Venue | Attendance |
|---|---|---|---|---|---|---|
| 1 | September 16 | at St. Louis Cardinals | **W** 24–13 | 1–0 | Busch Memorial Stadium | 49,757 |
| 2 | September 22 | Pittsburgh Steelers | **W** 45–10 | 2–0 | Los Angeles Memorial Coliseum | 49,647 |
| 3 | September 29 | at Cleveland Browns | **W** 24–6 | 3–0 | Cleveland Municipal Stadium | 82,514 |
| 4 | October 6 | **San Francisco 49ers** | **W** 24–10 | 4–0 | Los Angeles Memorial Coliseum | 69,520 |
| 5 | October 13 | at Green Bay Packers | **W** 16–14 | 5–0 | Milwaukee County Stadium | 49,646 |
| 6 | October 20 | **Atlanta Falcons** | **W** 27–14 | 6–0 | Los Angeles Memorial Coliseum | 54,443 |
| 7 | October 27 | at **Baltimore Colts** | **L** 10–27 | 6–1 | Memorial Stadium | 60,238 |
| 8 | November 3 | Detroit Lions | **W** 10–7 | 7–1 | Los Angeles Memorial Coliseum | 77,982 |
| 9 | November 10 | at **Atlanta Falcons** | **W** 17–10 | 8–1 | Atlanta Stadium | 53,979 |
| 10 | November 17 | at **San Francisco 49ers** | **T** 20–20 | 8–1–1 | Kezar Stadium | 41,815 |
| 11 | November 24 | New York Giants | **W** 24–21 | 9–1–1 | Los Angeles Memorial Coliseum | 68,534 |
| 12 | December 1 | at Minnesota Vikings | **W** 31–3 | 10–1–1 | Metropolitan Stadium | 47,644 |
| 13 | December 8 | Chicago Bears | **L** 16–17 | 10–2–1 | Los Angeles Memorial Coliseum | 66,368 |
| 14 | December 15 | **Baltimore Colts** | **L** 24–28 | 10–3–1 | Los Angeles Memorial Coliseum | 69,397 |
Note: Intra-division opponents are in **bold** text.

== Standings ==
NFL Coastal
| | W | L | T | PCT | DIV | CONF | PF | PA | STK |
|---|---|---|---|---|---|---|---|---|---|
| Baltimore Colts | 13 | 1 | 0 | .929 | 6–0 | 10–0 | 402 | 144 | W8 |
| Los Angeles Rams | 10 | 3 | 1 | .769 | 3–2–1 | 6–3–1 | 312 | 200 | L2 |
| San Francisco 49ers | 7 | 6 | 1 | .538 | 2–3–1 | 4–5–1 | 303 | 310 | W1 |
| Atlanta Falcons | 2 | 12 | 0 | .143 | 0–6 | 1–9 | 170 | 389 | L4 |

Note: Tie games were not officially counted in the standings until 1972.
