= 1965 Los Angeles Rams season =

NFL team season

- Owner: Dan Reeves
- Head coach: Harland Svare
- Home stadium: Los Angeles Memorial Coliseum

Results
- Record: 4–10
- Division place: 7th NFL Western
- Playoffs: Did not qualify

The 1965 Los Angeles Rams season was the team's 28th year with the National Football League and the 20th season in Los Angeles. This season saw the Rams attempting to improve on their 5–7–2 record from 1964 and snap a streak of 6 straight losing seasons. The Rams opened the season against the Detroit Lions and lost 20–0 in Detroit. However, the Rams were able to bounce back and beat the Chicago Bears in their home opener by a score of 30–28. But after the Bears win, the Rams began to choke, as they lost their next 8 games and fell out of tournament contention. After 3 straight wins against the Packers, Cardinals and Browns, the Rams lost to the Colts by a score of 20–17 at home and finished 4–10.

== Schedule ==
Week	Date	Opponent	Result	Record	Venue	Attendance
2	September 19	at **Detroit Lions**	**L** 0–20	0–1	Tiger Stadium	46,941
3	September 25	**Chicago Bears**	**W** 30–28	1–1	Los Angeles Memorial Coliseum	36,359
4	October 3	**Minnesota Vikings**	**L** 35–38	1–2	Los Angeles Memorial Coliseum	36,755
5	October 10	at **Chicago Bears**	**L** 6–31	1–3	Wrigley Field	45,760
6	October 17	**San Francisco 49ers**	**L** 21–45	1–4	Los Angeles Memorial Coliseum	38,615
7	October 24	at **Baltimore Colts**	**L** 20–35	1–5	Memorial Stadium	60,238
8	October 31	**Detroit Lions**	**L** 7–31	1–6	Los Angeles Memorial Coliseum	35,187
9	November 7	at **Minnesota Vikings**	**L** 13–24	1–7	Metropolitan Stadium	47,426
10	November 14	at **Green Bay Packers**	**L** 3–6	1–8	Milwaukee County Stadium	48,485
11	November 21	at **San Francisco 49ers**	**L** 27–30	1–9	Kezar Stadium	39,253
12	November 28	**Green Bay Packers**	**W** 21–10	2–9	Los Angeles Memorial Coliseum	39,733
13	December 5	at St. Louis Cardinals	**W** 27–3	3–9	Busch Stadium	27,943
14	December 12	Cleveland Browns	**W** 42–7	4–9	Los Angeles Memorial Coliseum	49,048
15	December 18	**Baltimore Colts**	**L** 17–20	4–10	Los Angeles Memorial Coliseum	46,636
Note: Intra-conference opponents are in **bold** text.

== Roster ==
1965 Los Angeles Rams roster
Quarterbacks (QB): 18 Roman Gabriel; 14 Ron Smith; Running backs (RB): 15 Terry Baker; 22 Dick Bass; 26 Willie Brown; 34 Les Josephson; 26 Jim Stiger; 36 Ben Wilson; Wide receivers (WR): 20 Steve Heckard; 29 Tommy McDonald; 84 Jack Snow; Tight ends (TE): 86 Marlin McKeever; 87 Billy Truax	Offensive linemen (OL): 63 Joe Carollo T; 62 Don Chuy G; 73 Charley Cowan G/T; 50 Ken Iman C; 52 Frank Marchlewski C; 72 Roger Pillath T; 71 Joe Scibelli G; 70 Frank Varrichione G/T; 54 Joe Wendryhoski G; Defensive linemen (DL): 76 Rosey Grier DT; 75 Deacon Jones DE; 85 Lamar Lundy DE; 74 Merlin Olsen DT; 64 Tim Powell DE	Linebackers (LB): 81 Fred Brown OLB; 33 Mac Byrd OLB; 58 Dan Currie OLB; 88 Tony Guillory OLB/MLB; 89 Cliff Livingston OLB; 57 Doug Woodlief MLB; Defensive backs (DB): 44 Chuck Lamson SS; 21 Eddie Meador FS; 17 Danny McIlhany CB; 43 Jerry Richardson CB; 24 Clancy Williams CB; Special teams (ST): 30 Bruce Gossett K; 13 Jon Kilgore P	Practice squad: 78 Frank Molden DT; -- Rex Harrison TE; Reserve: 42 Aaron Martin CB (IR); 19 Bill Munson QB (IR); 80 Bucky Pope WR (IR); -- Phil Zera RB (IR); Rookies in italics

== Standings ==
NFL Western Conference
	W	L	T	PCT	CONF	PF	PA	STK
Green Bay Packers	10	3	1	.769	8–3–1	316	224	T1
Baltimore Colts	10	3	1	.769	8–3–1	389	284	W1
Chicago Bears	9	5	0	.643	7–5	409	275	L1
San Francisco 49ers	7	6	1	.538	6–5–1	421	402	T1
Minnesota Vikings	7	7	0	.500	5–7	383	403	W2
Detroit Lions	6	7	1	.462	4–7–1	257	295	W1
Los Angeles Rams	4	10	0	.286	2–10	269	328	L1

Note: Tie games were not officially counted in the standings until 1972.
