= 1966 Green Bay Packers season =

48th NFL franchise season; first team to win Super Bowl

- General manager: Vince Lombardi
- Head coach: Vince Lombardi
- Home stadium: Lambeau Field; Milwaukee County Stadium

Results
- Record: 12–2
- Division place: 1st NFL Western
- Playoffs: Won NFL Championship (at Cowboys) 34–27; Won Super Bowl I (vs. Chiefs) 35–10
- All-Pros: Herb Adderley, Lee Roy Caffey, Willie Davis, Forrest Gregg, Jerry Kramer, Ray Nitschke, Bart Starr, Willie Wood
- Pro Bowlers: Herb Adderley, Willie Davis, Forrest Gregg, Henry Jordan, Dave Robinson, Bob Skoronski, Bart Starr, Willie Wood

The 1966 Green Bay Packers season was their 48th season overall and their 46th in the National Football League (NFL). The defending NFL champions had a league-best regular season record of 12–2, led by eighth-year head coach Vince Lombardi and quarterback Bart Starr, in his eleventh NFL season.

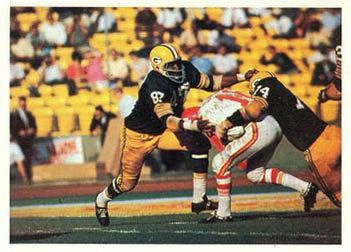
The Packers and the Chiefs in the first AFL–NFL Championship Game (Super Bowl I)

The Packers beat the Dallas Cowboys in the NFL championship game, the Packers' second consecutive NFL title, fourth under Lombardi, and tenth for the franchise. Two weeks later, the Packers recorded a 35–10 victory over the Kansas City Chiefs in the inaugural AFL-NFL Championship Game, retroactively known as Super Bowl I.

Quarterback Starr was named the league's most valuable player (MVP) in 1966, leading the league in completion percentage, yards per attempt, and passer rating, and ending the season with a 4.7-to-1 touchdown-interception ratio. This assisted the team's struggling rushing game, which averaged 3.5 yards-per-attempt (the worst in the league that season). The 1966 Packers also had the best passer rating differential (offensive passer rating minus opponents passer rating), +56.0, in the Super Bowl Era.

In 2007, the 1966 Packers were ranked as the sixth greatest Super Bowl champions on the NFL Network's documentary series America's Game: The Super Bowl Champions, with team commentary from Bill Curry, Willie Davis, and Bart Starr, and narrated by Donald Sutherland. More than a decade later, this team ranked #13 on the 100 greatest teams of all time presented by the NFL on its 100th anniversary.

== Offseason ==
The Washington Redskins made overtures to Vince Lombardi about becoming their new head coach. Lombardi refused their offer and the Redskins had to settle for Otto Graham as their new head coach. Lombardi replaced Graham in Washington in 1969.

=== NFL draft ===
In the 1966 NFL draft, held in late November 1965, the Packers selected running back Jim Grabowski of Illinois with the ninth overall pick. Common for pro football in the mid-1960s, the Packers found themselves in a bidding war for Grabowski. The expansion Miami Dolphins of the American Football League selected Grabowski with the first overall selection of the AFL draft, held the same day. Lombardi's plan was to groom Grabowski to take over for Jim Taylor at fullback. Despite being offered more money by the Dolphins, Grabowski said it was an honor to be drafted by the Packers. Grabowski signed with the Packers and landed on the cover of Sports Illustrated in August, with veteran backfield tandem Paul Hornung and Taylor on the main cover and rookies Grabowski and Donny Anderson on the foldout. The signing of Grabowski upset Taylor, who felt that he was underpaid and made it publicly known that he would leave Green Bay once his contract expired. Taylor had been given an offer by the expansion Atlanta Falcons, but agreed to honor his contract before moving to another team and played out his option in 1966.

Fellow rookie running back Anderson of Texas Tech was the seventh overall selection of the 1965 draft as an underclassman, and he stayed in school for his senior season in 1965. Due to their large contracts, signed during the height of the pre-merger bidding war with the AFL, as well as their high visibility as the apparent replacements for Hornung and Taylor, Anderson and Grabowski were nicknamed the "Gold Dust Twins."

The 1966 draft (November 1965) was the last one held separately for the two leagues. Following the merger agreement of June 1966, a common draft was conducted in March 1967.

1966 Green Bay Packers draft
Round	Pick	Player	Position	College	Notes
1	9	Jim Grabowski	Fullback	Illinois	
1	13	Gale Gillingham *	Guard	Minnesota	
2	30	Tom Cichowski	Tackle	Maryland	
3	45	Fred Heron	Defensive end	San Jose State	
3	46	Tony Jeter	Tight end	Nebraska	
4	62	John Roderick	Wide receiver	SMU	
7	108	Ray Miller	Defensive end	Idaho	
8	124	Ken McLean	Wide receiver	Texas A&M	
9	138	Ron Rector	Running back	Northwestern	
10	154	Sam Montgomery	Defensive end	Southern	
11	168	Ralph Wenzel	Guard	San Diego State	
12	184	Jim Mankins	Running back	Florida State	
13	198	Ed King	Linebacker	USC	
14	214	Ron Hanson	Wide receiver	North Dakota State	
15	228	Grady Bolton	Tackle	Mississippi State	
16	244	Bob Schultz	Defensive end	Wisconsin–Stevens Point	
17	258	Dave Hathcock	Defensive back	Memphis State	
18	274	Jim Jones	Defensive end	Nebraska-Omaha	
19	288	Dave Moton	Wide receiver	USC	
20	304	Ed Maras	Wide receiver	South Dakota State	
Made roster * Made at least one Pro Bowl during career

=== Undrafted free agents ===
1966 undrafted free agents of note
Player	Position	College
Jim Chevillot	Guard	Boston College
Steve Buratto	Center	SMU
Kent Nix	Quarterback	TCU
Marty Sica	Defensive Line	Maryland

== Roster ==
1966 Green Bay Packers roster
Quarterbacks (QB): 12 Zeke Bratkowski; 15 Bart Starr; Running backs (RB): 44 Donny Anderson; 33 Jim Grabowski; 5 Paul Hornung; 22 Elijah Pitts; 31 Jim Taylor; Wide receivers (WR): 84 Carroll Dale; 86 Boyd Dowler; 80 Bob Long; 27 Red Mack; 85 Max McGee; Tight ends (TE): 88 Bill Anderson; 81 Marv Fleming	Offensive linemen (OL): 57 Ken Bowman C; 50 Bill Curry C; 68 Gale Gillingham G; 75 Forrest Gregg T; 64 Jerry Kramer G; 76 Bob Skoronski T; 63 Fuzzy Thurston G; 72 Steve Wright T; Defensive linemen (DL): 82 Lionel Aldridge DE; 78 Bob Brown DT/DE; 87 Willie Davis DE; 74 Henry Jordan DT; 77 Ron Kostelnik DT; 73 Jim Weatherwax DE/DT	Linebackers (LB): 60 Lee Roy Caffey OLB; 56 Tommy Joe Crutcher OLB; 66 Ray Nitschke MLB; 89 Dave Robinson OLB; 37 Phil Vandersea MLB; Defensive backs (DB): 26 Herb Adderley CB; 40 Tom Brown FS; 43 Doug Hart CB/S; 45 Dave Hathcock FS; 21 Bob Jeter CB; 24 Willie Wood SS; Special teams (ST): 34 Don Chandler K/P	Taxi squad: 44 Larry Moore K; 18 Kent Nix QB; 32 Sonny Redders RB; 65 Roy Schmidt G; 47 Jeff White WR; Reserve: 83 Allen Brown TE (IR); Rookies in italics

== Preseason ==
Date	Opponent	Site	Result	Score'

== Regular season ==
The defending champion Packers finished the regular season with a league best record of 12–2, returning them to the NFL championship game as Western Conference champions. Until 1975, NFL playoff sites were rotated, so the Eastern Conference champion Dallas Cowboys (10–3–1) hosted the title game in 1966 at the Cotton Bowl on January 1, 1967.

=== Schedule ===
Week	Date	Opponent	Result	Record	Venue	Attendance	Sources
1	September 10	**Baltimore Colts**	**W** 24–3	1–0	Milwaukee County Stadium	48,650	
2	September 18	at Cleveland Browns	**W** 21–20	2–0	Cleveland Stadium	83,943	
3	September 25	**Los Angeles Rams**	**W** 24–13	3–0	Lambeau Field	50,861	
4	October 2	**Detroit Lions**	**W** 23–14	4–0	Lambeau Field	50,861	
5	October 9	at **San Francisco 49ers**	**L** 20–21	4–1	Kezar Stadium	39,290	
6	October 16	at **Chicago Bears**	**W** 17–0	5–1	Wrigley Field	48,573	
7	October 23	Atlanta Falcons	**W** 56–3	6–1	Milwaukee County Stadium	48,623	
8	October 30	at **Detroit Lions**	**W** 31–7	7–1	Tiger Stadium	56,954	
9	November 6	**Minnesota Vikings**	**L** 17–20	7–2	Lambeau Field	50,861	
10	Bye						
11	November 20	**Chicago Bears**	**W** 13–6	8–2	Lambeau Field	50,861	
12	November 27	at **Minnesota Vikings**	**W** 28–16	9–2	Metropolitan Stadium	47,426	
13	December 4	**San Francisco 49ers**	**W** 20–7	10–2	Milwaukee County Stadium	48,725	
14	December 10	at **Baltimore Colts**	**W** 14–10	11–2	Memorial Stadium	60,238	
15	December 18	at **Los Angeles Rams**	**W** 27–23	12–2	Los Angeles Memorial Coliseum	72,416	
Note: Intra-conference opponents are in **bold** text.

=== Standings ===
NFL Western Conference
	W	L	T	PCT	CONF	PF	PA	STK
Green Bay Packers	12	2	0	.857	10–2	335	163	W5
Baltimore Colts	9	5	0	.643	7–5	314	226	W1
Los Angeles Rams	8	6	0	.571	6–6	289	212	L1
San Francisco 49ers	6	6	2	.500	5–5–2	320	325	L1
Chicago Bears	5	7	2	.417	4–6–2	234	272	W1
Detroit Lions	4	9	1	.308	3–8–1	206	317	L3
Minnesota Vikings	4	9	1	.308	4–7–1	292	304	L1

Note: Tie games were not officially counted in the standings until 1972.

=== Game summaries ===
==== Week 1 vs. Baltimore Colts ====
Week One: Baltimore Colts (0–0) at Green Bay Packers (0–0)

Quarter	1	2	3	4	Total
Colts	0	3	0	0	**3**
Packers	0	14	10	0	**24**

at Milwaukee County Stadium • Milwaukee, Wisconsin

- Date: September 10
- Game weather: 64 °F (18 °C) • Wind 8 miles per hour (13 km/h; 7.0 kn)
- Pro-Football-Reference.com

Game information

Colts

- Johnny Unitas
  14/20, 106 yards, 3 INT
- Jerry Hill
  13 rush, 51 yards
- Raymond Berry
  5 rec, 40 yards

Packers

- Bart Starr
  14/19, 138 yards, INT
- Jim Taylor
  16 rush, 76 yards
- Boyd Dowler
  6 rec, 73 yards

Scoring summary

Quarter	Time	Drive			Team	Scoring information	Score	
Quarter	Time	Plays	Yards	TOP	Team	Scoring information	BAL	GB
2					Colts	26-yard field goal by Lou Michaels	3	0
2					Packers	Interception returned 52 yards for touchdown by Lee Roy Caffey, Don Chandler kick good	3	7
2					Packers	Interception returned 46 yards for touchdown by Bob Jeter, Don Chandler kick good	3	14
3					Packers	Bart Starr 8-yard touchdown run, Don Chandler kick good	3	21
4					Packers	15-yard field goal by Don Chandler	3	24
"TOP" = time of possession. For other American football terms, see Glossary of American football.							3	24

==== Week 2: at Cleveland Browns ====
Week Two: Green Bay Packers (1–0) at Cleveland Browns (1–0)

Quarter	1	2	3	4	Total
**Packers**	0	7	7	7	**21**
Browns	7	10	0	3	**20**

at Cleveland Municipal Stadium, Cleveland, Ohio

- Date: Sunday, September 18
- Game weather: 62 °F (17 °C)
- Box Score

Game information

**First quarter**

- CLE – Gary Collins 11-yard pass from Frank Ryan (Lou Groza kick)

**Second quarter**

- CLE – Gary Collins 24-yard pass from Frank Ryan (Lou Groza kick)
- GB – Paul Hornung 44-yard pass from Bart Starr (Don Chandler kick)
- CLE – Lou Groza 42-yard field goal

**Third quarter**

- GB – Jim Taylor 1-yard run (Don Chandler kick)

**Fourth quarter**

- CLE – Lou Groza 46-yard field goal
- GB – Jim Taylor 9-yard pass from Bart Starr (Don Chandler kick)

**Passing**

- GB – Bart Starr 20/30, 238 yards, 2 TD
- CLE – Frank Ryan 15/24, 284 yards, 2 TD

**Rushing**

- GB – Paul Hornung 14 att, 51 yards
- CLE – Ernie Green 9 att, 52 yards

**Receiving**

- GB – Paul Hornung 3 rec, 69 yards, TD
- CLE – Gary Collins 4 rec, 70 yards, 2 TD

==== Week 3: vs. Los Angeles Rams ====
Week Three: Los Angeles Rams (2–0) at Green Bay Packers (2–0)

Quarter	1	2	3	4	Total
Rams	0	6	7	0	**13**
**Packers**	7	10	0	7	**24**

at Lambeau Field, Green Bay, Wisconsin

- Date: Sunday, September 25
- Game weather: 47 °F (8 °C)
- Box Score

Game information

**First quarter**

- GB – Paul Hornung 6-yard pass from Bart Starr (Don Chandler kick)

**Second quarter**

- GB – Paul Hornung 4-yard run (Don Chandler kick)
- GB – Don Chandler 41-yard field goal
- LA – Bruce Gossett 13-yard field goal
- LA – Bruce Gossett 35-yard field goal

**Third quarter**

- LA – Dick Bass 8-yard run (Bruce Gossett kick)

**Fourth quarter**

- GB – Elijah Pitts 80-yard pass from Bart Starr (Don Chandler kick)

**Passing**

- LA – Roman Gabriel 14/28, 124 yards, INT
- GB – Bart Starr 12/20, 257 yards, 2 TD

**Rushing**

- LA – Dick Bass 13 att, 59 yards, TD
- GB – Jim Taylor 15 att, 42 yards

**Receiving**

- LA – Billy Traux 7 rec, 62 yards
- GB – Elijah Pitts 1 rec, 80 yards, TD

==== Week 4: vs. Detroit Lions ====
Week Four: Detroit Lions (2–1) at Green Bay Packers (3–0)

Quarter	1	2	3	4	Total
Lions	0	7	0	7	**14**
**Packers**	10	7	3	3	**23**

at Lambeau Field, Green Bay, Wisconsin

- Date: Sunday, October 2
- Game weather: 49 °F (9 °C)
- Box Score

Game information

**First quarter**

- GB – Marv Fleming 53-yard pass from Bart Starr (Don Chandler kick)
- GB – Don Chandler 14-yard field goal

**Second quarter**

- GB – Carroll Dale 78-yard pass from Bart Starr (Don Chandler kick)
- DET – Tom Nowatzke 1-yard run (Wayne Walker kick)

**Third quarter**

- GB – Don Chandler 22-yard field goal

**Fourth quarter**

- DET – Amos Marsh 8-yard run (Wayne Walker kick)
- GB – Don Chandler 31-yard field goal

**Passing**

- DET – Milt Plum 15/24, 193 yards, 2 INT
- GB – Bart Starr 11/19, 212 yards, 2 TD

**Rushing**

- DET – Amos Marsh 21 att, 89 yards, TD
- GB – Jim Taylor 12 att, 34 yards

**Receiving**

- DET – Pat Studstill 5 rec, 89 yards
- GB – Carroll Dale 2 rec, 99 yards, TD

==== Week 5: at San Francisco 49ers ====
Week Five: Green Bay Packers (4–0) at San Francisco 49ers (0–2–1)

Quarter	1	2	3	4	Total
Packers	3	0	10	7	**20**
**49ers**	0	7	7	7	**21**

at Kezar Stadium, San Francisco, California

- Date: Sunday, October 9
- Game weather: 64 °F (18 °C)
- Box Score

Game information

**First quarter**

- GB – Don Chandler 18-yard field goal

**Second quarter**

- SF – John David Crow 27-yard pass from George Mira (Tommy Davis kick)

**Third quarter**

- SF – Matt Hazeltine 22-yard fumble return (Tommy Davis kick)
- GB – Paul Hornung 43-yard pass from Bart Starr (Don Chandler kick)
- GB – Don Chandler 22-yard field goal

**Fourth quarter**

- SF – John David Crow 8-yard pass from George Mira (Tommy Davis kick)
- GB – Carroll Dale 38-yard pass from Bart Starr (Don Chandler kick)

**Passing**

- GB – Bart Starr 18/26, 287 yards, 2 TD, INT
- SF – George Mira 9/21, 104 yards, 2 TD, INT

**Rushing**

- GB – Jim Taylor 16 att, 54 yards
- SF – George Mira 3 att, 46 yards

**Receiving**

- GB – Carroll Dale 4 rec, 86 yards, TD
- SF – John David Crow 5 rec, 53 yards, 2 TD

==== Week 6: at Chicago Bears ====
Week Six: Green Bay Packers (4–1) at Chicago Bears (2–2)

Quarter	1	2	3	4	Total
**Packers**	0	0	10	7	**17**
Bears	0	0	0	0	**0**

at Wrigley Field, Chicago, Illinois

- Date: Sunday, October 16
- Game weather: 43 °F (6 °C)
- Box Score

Game information

**Third quarter**

- GB – Paul Hornung 1-yard run (Don Chandler kick)
- GB – Don Chandler 30-yard field goal

**Fourth quarter**

- GB – Willie Wood 20-yard interception return (Don Chandler kick)

**Passing**

- GB – Bart Starr 8/18, 80 yards, INT
- CHI – Rudy Bukich 12/23, 69 yards, 3 INT

**Rushing**

- GB – Jim Taylor 17 att, 66 yards
- CHI – Gale Sayers 15 att, 29 yards

**Receiving**

- GB – Jim Taylor 4 rec, 42 yards
- CHI – Mike Ditka 2 rec, 26 yards

==== Week 7: vs. Atlanta Falcons ====
Week Seven: Atlanta Falcons (0–6) at Green Bay Packers (5–1)

Quarter	1	2	3	4	Total
Falcons	0	0	3	0	**3**
**Packers**	7	21	7	21	**56**

at Milwaukee County Stadium, Milwaukee, Wisconsin

- Date: Sunday, October 23
- Game weather: 46 °F (8 °C)
- Box Score

Game information

**First quarter**

- GB – Elijah Pitts 3-yard run (Don Chandler kick)

**Second quarter**

- GB – Jim Taylor 1-yard run (Don Chandler kick)
- GB – Carroll Dale 51-yard pass from Bart Starr (Don Chandler kick)
- GB – Donny Anderson 5-yard run (Don Chandler kick)

**Third quarter**

- ATL – Lou Kirouac 41-yard field goal
- GB – Herb Adderley 68-yard interception return

**Fourth quarter**

- GB – Max McGee 24-yard pass from Bart Starr (Don Chandler kick)
- GB – Donny Anderson 77-yard punt return (Don Chandler kick)
- GB – Doug Hart 40-yard interception return (Don Chandler kick)

**Passing**

- ATL – Randy Johnson 5/17, 91 yards, 3 INT
- GB – Bart Starr 8/13, 220 yards, TD

**Rushing**

- ATL – Ernie Wheelwright 8 att, 51 yards
- GB – Jim Grabowski 7 att, 52 yards

**Receiving**

- ATL – Bill Martin 4 rec, 42 yards
- GB – Carroll Dale 4 rec, 110 yards, TD

==== Week 8: at Detroit Lions ====
Week Eight: Green Bay Packers (6–1) at Detroit Lions (2–5)

Quarter	1	2	3	4	Total
**Packers**	0	17	7	7	**31**
Lions	0	7	0	0	**7**

at Tiger Stadium, Detroit, Michigan

- Date: Sunday, October 30
- Game weather: 37 °F (3 °C)
- Box Score

Game information

**Second quarter**

- GB – Elijah Pitts 4-yard run (Don Chandler kick)
- GB – Don Chandler 40-yard field goal
- DET – Tom Nowatzke 2-yard run (Wayne Walker kick)
- GB – Elijah Pitts 24-yard pass from Bart Starr (Don Chandler kick)

**Third quarter**

- GB – Jim Taylor 1-yard run (Don Chandler kick)

**Fourth quarter**

- GB – Elijah Pitts 3-yard run (Don Chandler kick)

**Passing**

- GB – Bart Starr 11/13, 154 yards, TD
- DET – Karl Sweetan 21/45, 271 yards, 3 INT

**Rushing**

- GB – Elijah Pitts 21 att, 99 yards, 2 TD
- DET – Tom Nowatzke 9 att, 52 yards, TD

**Receiving**

- GB – Carroll Dale 1 rec, 52 yards
- DET – Pat Studstill 7 rec, 164 yards

==== Week 9: vs. Minnesota Vikings ====
Week Nine: Minnesota Vikings (2–4–1) at Green Bay Packers (7–1)

Quarter	1	2	3	4	Total
**Vikings**	0	10	0	10	**20**
Packers	7	3	7	0	**17**

at Lambeau Field, Green Bay, Wisconsin

- Date: Sunday, November 6
- Game weather: 31 °F (−1 °C)
- Box Score

Game information

**First quarter**

- GB – Jim Taylor 1-yard run (Don Chandler kick)

**Second quarter**

- MIN – Bill Brown 1-yard run (Fred Cox kick)
- GB – Don Chandler 11-yard field goal
- MIN – Fred Cox 31-yard field goal

**Third quarter**

- GB – Elijah Pitts 2-yard run (Don Chandler kick)

**Fourth quarter**

- MIN – Fred Cox 16-yard field goal
- MIN – Bill Brown 1-yard run (Fred Cox kick)

**Passing**

- MIN – Fran Tarkenton 16/26, 172 yards
- GB – Bart Starr 11/18, 140 yards

**Rushing**

- MIN – Bill Brown 21 att, 51 yards, 2 TD
- GB – Elijah Pitts 18 att, 89 yards, TD

**Receiving**

- MIN – Red Phillips 4 rec, 72 yards
- GB – Elijah Pitts 4 rec, 58 yards

==== Week 11: vs. Chicago Bears ====
Week Eleven: Chicago Bears (3–4–2) at Green Bay Packers (7–2)

Quarter	1	2	3	4	Total
Bears	0	0	0	6	**6**
**Packers**	0	7	0	6	**13**

at Lambeau Field, Green Bay, Wisconsin

- Date: Sunday, November 20
- Game weather: 32 °F (0 °C)
- Box Score

Game information

**Second quarter**

- GB – Carroll Dale 6-yard pass from Zeke Bratkowski (Don Chandler kick)

**Fourth quarter**

- CHI – Gale Sayers 2-yard run (kick failed)
- GB – Carroll Dale 33-yard pass from Zeke Bratkowski (kick failed)

**Passing**

- CHI – Rudy Bukich 7/17, 79 yards, 2 INT
- GB – Zeke Bratkowski 14/25, 190 yards, 2 TD, INT

**Rushing**

- CHI – Gale Sayers 20 att, 68 yards, TD
- GB – Jim Taylor 20 att, 49 yards

**Receiving**

- CHI – Ronnie Bull 3 rec, 33 yards
- GB – Carroll Dale 6 rec, 87 yards, 2 TD

==== Week 12: at Minnesota Vikings ====
Week Twelve: Green Bay Packers (8–2) at Minnesota Vikings (3–6–1)

Quarter	1	2	3	4	Total
**Packers**	7	14	0	7	**28**
Vikings	3	0	6	7	**16**

at Metropolitan Stadium, Bloomington, Minnesota

- Date: Sunday, November 27
- Game weather: 33 °F (1 °C)
- Box Score

Game information

**First quarter**

- MIN – Fred Cox 27-yard field goal
- GB – Elijah Pitts 1-yard run (Don Chandler kick)

**Second quarter**

- GB – Jim Taylor 14-yard pass from Bart Starr (Don Chandler kick)
- GB – Marv Fleming 10-yard pass from Bart Starr (Don Chandler kick)

**Third quarter**

- MIN – Fred Cox 30-yard field goal
- MIN – Fred Cox 22-yard field goal

**Fourth quarter**

- MIN – Dave Osborn 38-yard pass from Fran Tarkenton (Fred Cox kick)
- GB – Jim Grabowski 36-yard run (Don Chandler kick)

**Passing**

- GB – Bart Starr 20/31, 149 yards, 2 TD
- MIN – Fran Tarkenton 15/27, 229 yards, TD, INT

**Rushing**

- GB – Jim Grabowski 7 att, 61 yards, TD
- MIN – Jim Lindsey 11 att, 40 yards
  Bill Brown 17 att, 40 yards

**Receiving**

- GB – Marv Fleming 4 rec, 37 yards, TD
- MIN – Red Phillips 5 rec, 98 yards

==== Week 13: vs. San Francisco 49ers ====
Week Thirteen: San Francisco 49ers (5–4–2) at Green Bay Packers (9–2)

Quarter	1	2	3	4	Total
49ers	0	0	0	7	**7**
**Packers**	7	0	0	13	**20**

at Milwaukee County Stadium, Milwaukee, Wisconsin

- Date: Sunday, December 4
- Game weather: 20 °F (−7 °C)
- Box Score

Game information

**First quarter**

- GB – Carroll Dale 83-yard pass from Bart Starr (Don Chandler kick)

**Fourth quarter**

- GB – Bart Starr 1-yard run (kick failed)
- SF – Dave Parks 65-yard pass from John Brodie (Tommy Davis kick)
- GB – Elijah Pitts 2-yard run (Don Chandler kick)

**Passing**

- SF – John Brodie 14/33, 183 yards, TD, 2 INT
- GB – Bart Starr 13/24, 236 yards, TD

**Rushing**

- SF – John David Crow 9 att, 52 yards
  Ken Willard 14 att, 52 yards
- GB – Jim Taylor 18 att, 84 yards

**Receiving**

- SF – Dave Parks 6 rec, 138 yards, TD
- GB – Carroll Dale 3 rec, 142 yards, TD

==== Week 14: at Baltimore Colts ====
Week Fourteen: Green Bay Packers (10–2) at Baltimore Colts (8–4)

Quarter	1	2	3	4	Total
**Packers**	7	0	0	7	**14**
Colts	0	10	0	0	**10**

at Memorial Stadium, Baltimore, Maryland

- Date: Sunday, December 10
- Game weather: 58 °F (14 °C)
- Box Score

Game information

**First quarter**

- GB – Elijah Pitts 42-yard pass from Bart Starr (Don Chandler kick)

**Second quarter**

- BAL – Tony Lorick 1-yard run (Lou Michaels kick)
- BAL – Lou Michaels 26-yard field goal

**Fourth quarter**

- GB – Elijah Pitts 2-yard run (Don Chandler kick)

**Passing**

- GB – Bart Starr 7/15, 96 yards, TD
- BAL – Johnny Unitas 11/24, 140 yards, 3 INT

**Rushing**

- GB – Elijah Pitts 11 att, 43 yards, TD
  Jim Taylor 17 att, 43 yards
- BAL – Jerry Hill 25 att, 88 yards

**Receiving**

- GB – Elijah Pitts 4 rec, 79 yards, TD
- BAL – Raymond Berry 4 rec, 59 yards

Zeke Bratkowski relieved Bart Starr, who suffered a muscle spasm in the first half. Bratkowski directed an 80-yard drive in the fourth quarter that resulted in a go-ahead touchdown run by Elijah Pitts. John Unitas then led the Colts to the Green Bay 15, but there lost a fumble which came to be known as the 'Million Dollar Fumble', to secure the Packers' win that clinched the Western Conference crown.

==== Week 15: at Los Angeles Rams ====
Week Fifteen: Green Bay Packers (11–2) at Los Angeles Rams (8–5)

Quarter	1	2	3	4	Total
**Packers**	7	10	0	10	**27**
Rams	3	6	0	14	**23**

at Los Angeles Memorial Coliseum, Los Angeles, California

- Date: Sunday, December 18
- Game weather: 58 °F (14 °C)
- Box Score

Game information

**First quarter**

- LA – Bruce Gossett 36-yard field goal
- GB – Bob Jeter 75-yard interception return (Don Chandler kick)

**Second quarter**

- LA – Bruce Gossett 30-yard field goal
- GB – Don Chandler 10-yard field goal
- LA – Bruce Gossett 17-yard field goal
- GB – Donny Anderson 2-yard run (Don Chandler kick)

**Fourth quarter**

- GB – Carroll Dale 23-yard pass from Zeke Bratkowski (Don Chandler kick)
- GB – Don Chandler 47-yard field goal
- LA – Roman Gabriel 11-yard run (Bruce Gossett kick)
- LA – Marlin McKeever 3-yard pass from Roman Gabriel (Bruce Gossett kick)

**Passing**

- GB – Zeke Bratkowski 13/23, 245 yards, TD, INT
- LA – Roman Gabriel 22/37, 237 yards, TD, INT

**Rushing**

- GB – Donny Anderson 11 att, 58 yards, TD
- LA – Dick Bass 14 att, 49 yards

**Receiving**

- GB – Carroll Dale 3 rec, 121 yards, TD
- LA – Jack Snow 2 rec, 62 yards

== Postseason ==
=== NFL Championship Game ===
Green Bay Packers 34, Dallas Cowboys 27

Quarter	1	2	3	4	Total
Packers	14	7	7	6	34
Cowboys	14	3	3	7	27

at Cotton Bowl, Dallas, Texas

- Date: Sunday, January 1
- Game attendance: 74,152
- Box Score

Game information

First quarter

- GB – Elijah Pitts 17-yard pass from Bart Starr (Don Chandler kick)
- GB – Jim Grabowski 18-yard fumble return (Don Chandler kick)
- DAL – Dan Reeves 3-yard run (Danny Villanueva kick)
- DAL – Don Perkins 23-yard run (Danny Villanueva kick)

Second quarter

- GB – Carroll Dale 51-yard pass from Bart Starr (Don Chandler kick)
- DAL – Danny Villanueva 11-yard field goal

Third quarter

- DAL – Danny Villanueva 32-yard field goal
- GB – Boyd Dowler 16-yard pass from Bart Starr (Don Chandler kick)

Fourth quarter

- GB – Max McGee 28-yard pass from Bart Starr (kick blocked)
- DAL – Frank Clarke 68-yard pass from Don Meredith (Danny Villanueva kick)

Passing

- GB – Bart Starr 19/28, 304 yards, 4 TD
- DAL – Don Meredith 15/31, 238 yards, TD, INT

Rushing

- GB – Elijah Pitts 12 att, 66 yards
- DAL – Don Perkins 17 att, 108 yards, TD

Receiving

- GB – Carroll Dale 5 rec, 128 yards, TD
- DAL – Frank Clarke 3 rec, 102 yards, TD

Green Bay took an early 14–0 lead on two first-quarter scores; a 17-yard touchdown pass from Bart Starr to Elijah Pitts and an 18-yard fumble return by Jim Grabowski on the ensuing kickoff. The Cowboys tied the score with two touchdowns towards the end of the quarter.

Starr's third touchdown pass of the game gave the Packers a 34–20 lead with 5:20 left in the game, but the Cowboys responded with a 68-yard touchdown pass from Don Meredith to Frank Clarke. Dallas advanced to the Green Bay 22-yard line on their next drive, when a pass interference penalty gave the Cowboys a first down at the Packer 2-yard line. But Green Bay's Tom Brown intercepted a Meredith pass in the end zone with 28 seconds left to play to preserve the victory for the Packers.

With the win, the Packers earned their 10th NFL championship. It was their second in a row and fourth in six seasons.

=== Super Bowl I ===
Green Bay Packers 35, Kansas City Chiefs 10

Quarter	1	2	3	4	Total
Chiefs	0	10	0	0	10
Packers	7	7	14	7	35

at Los Angeles Memorial Coliseum, Los Angeles, California

- Date: Sunday, January 15
- Game time: 1:15 p.m. PST
- Game weather: 72 °F (22 °C), sunny
- Game attendance: 61,946
- Box Score

Game information

First quarter

- GB – Max McGee 37-yard pass from Bart Starr (Don Chandler kick) 7–0 GB

Second quarter

- KC – Curtis McClinton 7-yard pass from Len Dawson (Mike Mercer kick) 7–7
- GB – Jim Taylor 14-yard run (Don Chandler kick) 14–7 GB
- KC – Mike Mercer 31-yard field goal 14–10 GB

Third quarter

- GB – Elijah Pitts 5-yard run (Don Chandler kick) 21–10 GB
- GB – Max McGee 13-yard pass from Bart Starr (Don Chandler kick) 28–10 GB

Fourth quarter

- GB – Elijah Pitts 1-yard run (Don Chandler kick) 35–10 GB

Passing

- KC – Len Dawson 16/27, 211 yards, TD, INT
- GB – Bart Starr 16/23, 250 yards, 2 TD, INT

Rushing

- KC – Len Dawson 3 att, 24 yards
- GB – Jim Taylor 17 att, 56 yards, TD

Receiving

- KC – Chris Burford 4 rec, 67 yards
- GB – Max McGee 7 rec, 138 yards, 2 TD

The first AFL-NFL World Championship Game in professional American football, later known as Super Bowl I, was played on January 15, 1967, at the Los Angeles Memorial Coliseum in Los Angeles, California. The Packers faced the Kansas City Chiefs from the AFL, who finished their regular season at 11–2–1.

In the week prior to the game, the Packers practiced at UC Santa Barbara, and the Chiefs at Veterans Field in Long Beach.

The Packers jumped out to an early 7–0 lead with Bart Starr's 37-yard touchdown pass to reserve receiver Max McGee, who had been put into the game just a few plays earlier to fill in for injured starter Boyd Dowler. Early in the second quarter, Kansas City marched 66 yards in 6 plays to tie the game on a 7-yard pass from quarterback Len Dawson to Curtis McClinton. But the Packers responded on their next drive, advancing 73 yards down the field and scoring on fullback Jim Taylor's 14-yard touchdown run with the team's famed "Power Sweep" play. The Chiefs then cut the lead with a minute left in the half, 14–10, on Mike Mercer's 31-yard field goal.

Early in the second half Dawson was intercepted by defensive back Willie Wood. He returned the interception 50 yards to the Kansas City 5-yard line. On the next play Elijah Pitts rushed 5-yards for a touchdown, giving the Packers a 21–10 lead. Max McGee scored his second touchdown of the game with a 13-yard reception from Bart Starr. The Packers held the Chiefs' offense to 12 yards in the third quarter. Elijah Pitts scored another touchdown for the Packers in the third quarter on a one-yard touchdown run. The Packers would win the game 35–10. Quarterback Bart Starr was named the MVP of the game, completing 16 of 23 passes for 250 yards and two touchdowns.

== Statistics ==
=== Team leaders ===
Category	Player(s)	Value
Passing yards	Bart Starr	2,257
Passing touchdowns	Bart Starr	14
Rushing yards	Jim Taylor	763
Rushing touchdowns	Elijah Pitts	7
Receiving yards	Carroll Dale	876
Receiving touchdowns	Carroll Dale	7
Points	Don Chandler	77
Kickoff return yards	Donny Anderson	533
Punt return yards	Donny Anderson	124
Interceptions	Dave Robinson/Bob Jeter	5
Sacks	Lionel Aldridge	12.5

Note that sack totals from 1960 to 1981 are considered unofficial by the NFL.

=== League rankings ===
Category	Total yards	Yards per game	NFL rank (out of 15)
Passing offense	2,602	173.5	6th
Rushing offense	1,673	111.5	8th
Total offense	4,275	285	8th
Passing defense	1,959	130.6	1st
Rushing defense	1,644	109.6	6th
Total defense	3,603	298.5	3rd

=== Awards and records ===
- Bart Starr, NFL MVP
- Bart Starr, Super Bowl most valuable player
