= List of Texas State Bobcats in the NFL draft =

This is a list of Texas State Bobcats football players in the NFL and AFL Drafts.

== Key ==
B	Back	K	Kicker	NT	Nose tackle
C	Center	LB	Linebacker	FB	Fullback
DB	Defensive back	P	Punter	HB	Halfback
DE	Defensive end	QB	Quarterback	WR	Wide receiver
DT	Defensive tackle	RB	Running back	G	Guard
E	End	T	Offensive tackle	TE	Tight end

== Selections ==
Year	Round	Overall	Player	Team	Position
1953	22	264	George Porter	Los Angeles Rams	T
1954	6	63	Pence Dacus	Detroit Lions	B
1956	15	170	Buzzy Allert	Detroit Lions	DE
1956	30	350	John Gibbens	Detroit Lions	T
1964	18	239	Jerry Cole	San Francisco 49ers	E
1964	21	166	Jerry Cole	Houston Oilers	B
1965	15	207	Wallace Dickey	Detroit Lions	T
1966	6	83	Wilbur Aylor	Minnesota Vikings	T
1966	9	77	Dick Suffel	Houston Oilers	DB
1966	10	86	Wilbur Aylor	Houston Oilers	DT
1966	15	128	Jerry Oliver	Miami Dolphins	T
1968	3	66	Reece Morrison	Cleveland Browns	RB
1968	13	339	Mack Sauls	St. Louis Cardinals	DB
1968	16	433	David Morrison	Oakland Raiders	DB
1969	13	314	Wade Key	Philadelphia Eagles	TE
1969	14	355	Tommy Head	Minnesota Vikings	C
1971	15	380	Mike Montgomery	Kansas City Chiefs	DB
1973	2	47	Jim Stienke	Cleveland Browns	DB
1973	7	168	Josh Brown	Minnesota Vikings	RB
1974	12	305	Noe Gonzalez	Oakland Raiders	RB
1974	13	315	Dennis Colvin	New York Giants	T
1975	14	343	Walter Hartfield	Chicago Bears	RB
1976	9	255	Bob Kotzur	Buffalo Bills	DT
1979	12	314	Paul Darby	New York Jets	WR
1982	2	42	Bobby Watkins	Detroit Lions	DB
1982	9	226	Ken Coffey	Washington Redskins	DB
1982	12	324	Mike Miller	Kansas City Chiefs	DB
1984	5	135	Van Hughes	Pittsburgh Steelers	DT
1984	6	157	Rod Clark	St. Louis Cardinals	LB
1984u	1	16	Ricky Sanders	New England Patriots	WR
1986	7	177	Pat Franklin	Cincinnati Bengals	RB
1989	6	149	A. J. Johnson	Washington Redskins	DB
1989	10	254	Ben Jessie	Green Bay Packers	DB
1989	12	311	Bill Jones	Kansas City Chiefs	RB
1990	7	172	Jeff Novak	San Diego Chargers	G
1991	11	303	Paul Alsbury	New England Patriots	P
2000	6	183	Spergon Wynn	Cleveland Browns	QB
2000	7	211	Darrick Vaughn	Atlanta Falcons	DB
2000	7	231	Cliffton Black	Oakland Raiders	DB
2002	6	8	Clenton Ballard	Jacksonville Jaguars	DT
2006	7	212	Fred Evans	Miami Dolphins	DT
2015	3	83	Craig Mager	San Diego Chargers	DB
2015	5	169	David Mayo	Carolina Panthers	LB
