= Bill Munson =

American football player (1941–2000)

No. 19, 9
- Position: Quarterback

Personal information
- Born: August 11, 1941; Sacramento, California, U.S.
- Died: July 10, 2000 (aged 58); Lodi, California, U.S.
- Listed height: 6 ft 2 in (1.88 m)
- Listed weight: 203 lb (92 kg)

Career information
- High school: Lodi
- College: Utah State
- NFL draft: 1964: 1st round, 7th overall pick
- AFL draft: 1964: 16th round, 126th overall pick

Career history
- Los Angeles Rams (1964–1967); Detroit Lions (1968–1975); Seattle Seahawks (1976); San Diego Chargers (1977); Buffalo Bills (1978–1979)

Career NFL statistics
- Passing attempts: 1,982
- Passing completions: 1,070
- Completion percentage: 54.0%
- TD–INT: 84–80
- Passing yards: 12,896
- Passer rating: 71.5
- Stats at Pro Football Reference

William Alan Munson (August 11, 1941 – July 10, 2000) was an American professional football player who was a quarterback in the National Football League (NFL) from 1964 through 1979. He also played college football for the Utah State Aggies where he set multiple passing records as a senior in 1963.

Drafted by the Los Angeles Rams in the first round of the 1964 NFL draft, Munson was the Rams' starting quarterback in 1964 and 1965 and a backup to Roman Gabriel in 1966 and 1967. In 1968, Munson was traded to the Detroit Lions where he remained for eight seasons (1968–1975), competing all the while for the starting quarterback position with Greg Landry. Munson concluded his career as a backup quarterback for the Seattle Seahawks (1976), San Diego Chargers (1977), and Buffalo Bills (1978–1979).

In 16 NFL seasons, Munson appeared in 107 games, 66 of them as a starting quarterback. His teams compiled a 27–34–5 record in the 66 games he started. Munson completed 1,070 of 1,982 passes for 12,896 yards, 84 touchdowns, and 80 interceptions. He also accumulated 548 rushing yards and three rushing touchdowns on 130 carries.

== Early life ==
Munson was born in Sacramento, California, in 1941. He moved to Lodi, California, as a boy and attended Lodi High School.

Munson attended Utah State University where he played college football for the Utah State Aggies football team. As senior in 1963, he led the Aggies to an 8-2 record and broke multiple school passing records, completing 120 of 201 passes (.592 completion percentage) for 1,699 yards, 12 touchdowns, and three interceptions. He was also named Utah State's athlete of the year for the 1963–64 academic year.

== Professional football ==
=== Los Angeles Rams ===
Munson was selected by the Los Angeles Rams in the first round, seventh overall pick, of the 1964 NFL draft. As a rookie in 1964, he started eight games for the Rams, leading them to a 2–4–2 record in those games. On December 14, 1964, he connected with Bucky Pope for a 95-yard touchdown against the Green Bay Packers, ranking as the longest pass play in the NFL during the 1964 season. The following year, he started the first 10 games for the Rams, compiling a 1–9 record, but missed the final four games due to a knee injury. Munson eventually lost the starting quarterback job to Roman Gabriel and saw only limited action as a backup for the Rams in 1966 and 1967.

=== Detroit Lions ===
In May 1968, Munson was traded by the Rams to the Detroit Lions along with a third round draft pick in exchange for Pat Studstill, Tom Watkins, Milt Plum, and Detroit's first round draft pick in the 1969 NFL/AFL draft. For the next eight years, Munson competed for the Lions' starting quarterback job with Greg Landry, who the Lions had selected with their first round pick in the 1968 NFL/AFL draft.

In his first season in Detroit, Munson started 10 games for the Lions, leading them to a 4–6–2 record and completing 181 of 329 passes for a career-high 2,311 yards, 15 touchdowns and eight interceptions. His 2.4% interception percentage was the best in the NFL in 1968. In 1969, Munson shared the starting quarterback position with Landry, each of them starting seven games. Munson and Landry again shared the quarterback position for the 1970 Lions, with Munson starting eight games and Landry seven. By 1971, Landry had won the starting job, and Munson served solely in a backup role during the 1971 and 1972 seasons.

In 1972, Landry and Munson returned to shared responsibilities with each starting seven games as the Lions' quarterback. Then, in 1974, Landry was injured in the final pre-season game, and Munson started 11 of 14 games for the Lions, completing 166 of 292 passes for 1,874 yards, eight touchdowns and seven interceptions. In 1975, Munson started only three games for the Lions, compiling a 1–2 record in those games.

=== 1976–1979 ===
In early September 1976, the Lions traded Munson to the Seattle Seahawks in exchange for a future draft choice. Munson spent the 1976 season as a backup for the Seahawks. He concluded his career serving as a backup for the San Diego Chargers (signed as a free agent) in 1977 and for the Buffalo Bills (traded by the Chargers) in 1978 and 1979.

=== Career statistics ===
Munson played for five NFL teams over 16 years from 1964 to 1979. He appeared in 107 games, 66 of them as a starting quarterback. His teams compiled a 27-34-5 record in the 66 games he started. Munson completed 1,070 of 1,982 passes for 12,896 yards, 84 touchdowns, and 80 interceptions. He also accumulated 548 rushing yards and three rushing touchdowns on 130 carries.

== Later life ==
After retiring from football, Munson lived in the Detroit area for several years, working for an automobile tooling business. He later retired and moved back to his home town of Lodi, California. Munson died in July 2000 at age 58. His body was found in the swimming pool of his home in Lodi.

== NFL career statistics ==
Legend
	Led the league
**Bold**	Career high

=== Regular season ===
Year	Team	Games			Passing									Rushing					Sacks	
Year	Team	GP	GS	Record	Cmp	Att	Pct	Yds	Y/A	Lng	TD	Int	Rtg	Att	Yds	Avg	Lng	TD	Sck	Yds
1964	LA	11	8	2–4–2	108	223	48.4	1,533	6.9	**95**	9	**15**	56.5	19	150	**7.9**	33	0	**42**	**307**
1965	LA	10	10	1–9	144	267	53.9	1,701	6.4	47	10	14	64.2	**26**	**157**	6.0	**38**	**1**	30	244
1966	LA	5	0	–	30	50	60.0	284	5.7	25	2	1	80.7	4	3	0.8	2	0	6	32
1967	LA	5	0	–	5	10	50.0	38	3.8	18	1	2	53.3	2	-22	-11.0	-	0	1	12
1968	DET	12	12	4–6–2	**181**	**329**	55.0	**2,311**	7.0	86	**15**	8	82.3	25	109	4.4	20	**1**	39	279
1969	DET	8	7	4–2–1	84	166	50.6	1,062	6.4	62	7	8	64.9	7	31	4.4	13	0	12	93
1970	DET	8	8	5–3	84	158	53.2	1,049	6.6	56	10	7	76.7	9	33	3.7	11	0	10	66
1971	DET	4	0	–	21	38	55.3	216	5.7	34	1	1	69.6	3	9	3.0	6	0	1	5
1972	DET	2	0	–	20	35	57.1	194	5.5	29	1	1	70.4	1	0	0.0	0	0	1	0
1973	DET	10	7	4–3	95	187	50.8	1,129	6.0	54	9	8	67.8	10	33	3.3	11	0	14	94
1974	DET	11	11	6–5	166	292	56.8	1,874	6.4	56	8	7	75.3	18	40	2.2	9	**1**	24	172
1975	DET	5	3	1–2	65	109	59.6	626	5.7	32	5	2	83.4	4	-3	-0.8	2	0	8	65
1976	SEA	5	0	–	20	37	54.1	295	**8.0**	44	1	3	55.6	1	6	6.0	6	0	3	29
1977	SDG	4	0	–	20	31	**64.5**	225	7.3	28	1	1	83.4	1	2	2.0	2	0	1	11
1978	BUF	4	0	–	24	43	55.8	328	7.6	43	4	2	**92.0**	0	0	0.0	0	0	0	0
1979	BUF	3	0	–	3	7	42.9	31	4.4	16	0	0	56.2	0	0	0.0	0	0	0	0
Career		107	66	27–34–5	1,070	1,982	54.0	12,896	6.5	95	84	80	71.5	130	548	4.2	38	3	192	1,409

=== Playoffs ===
Year	Team	Games			Passing									Rushing					Sacks	
Year	Team	GP	GS	Record	Cmp	Att	Pct	Yds	Y/A	Lng	TD	Int	Rtg	Att	Yds	Avg	Lng	TD	Sck	Yds
1967	RAM	1	0	–	0	0	0.0	0	0.0	0	0	0	0.0	0	0	0.0	0	0	0	0
1970	DET	1	0	–	**2**	**8**	**25.0**	**44**	**5.5**	**39**	0	**1**	**10.4**	0	0	0.0	0	0	0	0
Career		2	0	–	2	8	25.0	44	5.5	39	0	1	10.4	0	0	0.0	0	0	0	0
