= Bruce Gossett =

American football player (1941–2025)

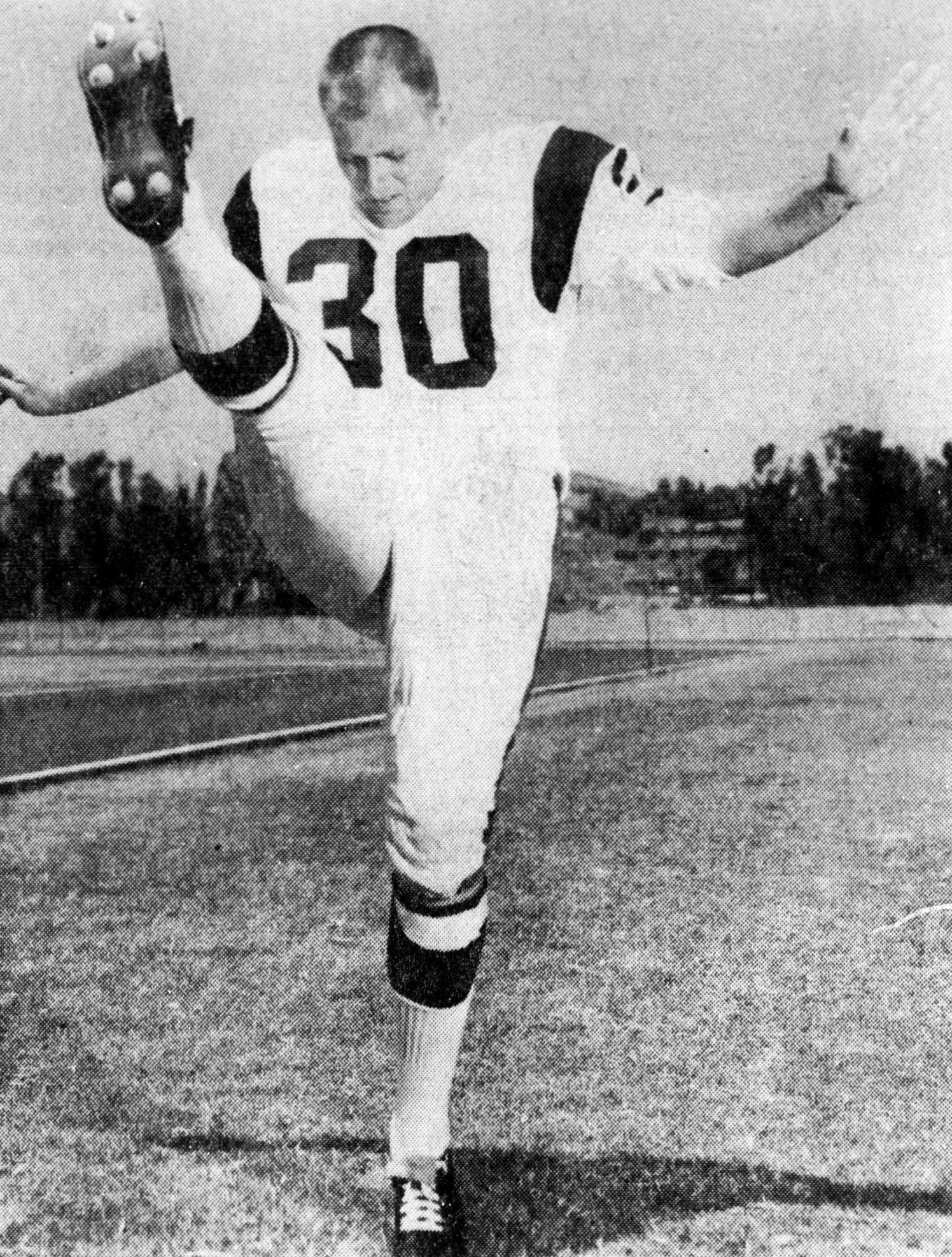
- Gossett, circa 1967

No. 30
- Position: Placekicker

Personal information
- Born: November 9, 1941; Canonsburg, Pennsylvania, U.S.
- Died: January 27, 2025 (aged 83); Rancho Murieta, California, U.S.
- Listed height: 6 ft 1 in (1.85 m)
- Listed weight: 204 lb (93 kg)

Career information
- High school: Cecil (Cecil Township, Pennsylvania)
- College: Ferrum; Clarion; Duquesne; Richmond
- NFL draft: 1964: undrafted

Career history
- Los Angeles Rams (1964–1969); San Francisco 49ers (1970–1974)

Awards and highlights
- NFL scoring leader (1966); 2× Pro Bowl (1966, 1968)

Career NFL statistics
- Field goals: 219/360
- Field goal %: 60.8%
- Longest field goal: 54
- Extra points: 374/383
- Extra point %: 97.7%
- Points scored: 1031
- Punts: 2
- Punt yards: 56
- Stats at Pro Football Reference

Daniel Bruce Gossett (November 9, 1941 - January 27, 2025) was an American professional football player who was a placekicker in the National Football League (NFL) from 1964 to 1974 with the Los Angeles Rams and San Francisco 49ers.

== Early life ==
Gossett was born on November 9, 1941, in Cecil or Canonsburg, Pennsylvania. His father was a professional soccer player, playing in the 1930s and 1940s, and was the person who taught Gossett how to kick. Gossett attended Cecil Township High School (which later merged into Canon-McMillan High School). He was on the high school football team, at fullback, and played on the basketball team as well. He also participated in junior league soccer.

Gossett did not do much kicking for the football team in high school. He did not attempt a field goal, and drop-kicked extra points as there was no one who could hold the ball for him.

== College ==
After graduating high school, Gossett attended Clarion State Teachers College (now PennWest Clarion), where he was a quarterback and punter. After one year, he transferred to Ferrum College (then Ferrum Junior College) where he was a kicker and quarterback on the school's football team. He averaged 49 yards kicking, but did not try a field goal. He also played on the baseball team at Ferrum, and pitched the second no-hitter in school history.

He received a scholarship to Richmond University (now University of Richmond) solely as a kicker, where he was a field goal kicker and a punter. He was primarily a punter at Richmond, kicking only two field goals during his time there; though he kicked a game-winning field goal in his first Richmond game. He also attended Duquesne University.

During his NFL career, he participated in football camps at Ferrum, teaching kicking to boys from 10 to 18 years old. In 2018, he was inducted into the Ferrum College Hall of Fame.

== Professional career ==
=== Los Angeles Rams ===
After going undrafted in the 1964 NFL draft, Gossett was picked up by the Los Angeles Rams as a free agent in 1964. Gossett focused on punting when trying out for the Rams, but during an exhibition game he had to substitute for the regular place kicker, making four field goals and driving his kickoffs out of the endzone. He was selected to be their starting kicker for the 1964 season.

==== 1964 ====
In Gossett's first season with the Rams, he successfully made 18 of 24 field goal attempts, as well as 31 of his 33 extra point attempts. His field goal percentage (75.0) led the league, and was at the time the second highest percentage in NFL history for kickers with more than 20 attempts, and the highest percentage in franchise history. For his performance, he was named to the NFL All-Rookie team. Despite his historic rookie season, the Rams would win just 5 games and ultimately not qualify for the playoffs.

==== 1965 ====
In his second year with the Rams, Gossett made 15 of 26 field goal attempts, as well as 30 of 32 extra point attempts. The Rams would win just 4 games in 1965, and would once again miss the playoffs.

==== 1966 ====
In 1966, Gossett would make just 28 of 49 field-goal attempts, though he also made all 29 of his extra-point attempts. He led the NFL in field goals attempted and field goals made. The Rams would ultimately miss the playoffs with an 8–6 record, earning their first winning record since 1958. Despite this, Gossett was the league's leader in scoring for the season with 113 points. Gossett was ultimately nominated to participate in the Pro Bowl for his performance during the season.

==== 1967 ====
In 1967, Gossett made 20 of 43 field goal attempts, and made all 48 of his extra-point attempts, again scoring over 100 points for the season. With 11 wins, the Rams became the first winners in the new Coastal division, and qualified for the playoffs for the first time in 12 years. In the Western Conference Championship game, Gossett would make one extra-point attempt as the Rams would lose to the Green Bay Packers 7-28. Due to their loss, they would appear in the Playoff Bowl, where Gossett would successfully make 3 field goals and 3 extra-point attempts as the Rams beat Cleveland 30–6. Gossett would ultimately be nominated to play in the 1968 Pro Bowl, marking his second (and last) nomination for the Pro Bowl.

==== 1968 ====
In 1968, Gossett made 17 of 31 field goal attempts, and made all 37 of his extra-point attempts. Despite having 10 wins, the Rams, and Gossett, would end the season 2nd in their division, and would ultimately miss the playoffs as a result of losing their last two matchups. In only five years with the Rams, he had become the team's second all-time leading scorer, and set the team record for total field goals (98).

==== 1969 ====
In 1969, Gossett's final season with the Rams, he made 22 of 34 field goal attempts, as well as all 36 of his extra-point attempts, again scoring over 100 points. The Rams would end the regular season 1st in their division with 11 wins, and would move on to the Western Conference Championship game, where they would lose to the Minnesota Vikings 20–23, with Gossett making two of three field goal attempts. As a result, they would move on to the Playoff Bowl, where they shutout the Dallas Cowboys 31–0.

When he left the Rams after 1969, he was the all-time leader in field goals (120), and is still (as of 2025) fourth on the list of most field goals for the Rams.

=== San Francisco 49ers ===
In January 1970, Gossett was traded to the San Francisco 49ers by the Rams for Kermit Alexander and a second round draft pick.

==== 1970 ====
In his first season with the 49ers, Gossett made 21 of 31 field-goal attempts, as well as 39 of his 41 extra-point attempts, marking his first season not successfully converting all of his extra-point attempts since 1965. Under the 49ers' 10 wins, Gossett and the team would make it to the playoffs, beating the Vikings 17–14. Gossett would make one field goal and both extra-point attempts in the victory. In the NFC Championship Game, Gossett would put up a field goal and an extra point as the 49ers would fall 10–17 to the Dallas Cowboys.

==== 1971 ====
In 1971, Gossett would make 23 of 36 field-goal attempts, as well as all 32 of his extra-point attempts. The 49ers would again make the playoffs this season, beating the Washington Redskins in the Divisional Playoff game 24–20. In the NFC Championship game, in a rematch against the Dallas Cowboys, Gossett would put up the team's only points, making one field goal in the 3–14 loss.

==== 1972 ====
In 1972, Gossett would make 18 of 29 field-goal attempts, as well as 41 of 42 extra-point attempts. The 49ers, with 8 wins, would make it to the playoffs, facing the Dallas Cowboys once again, this time in the Divisional Playoff game. Despite initially leading 28–13, Roger Staubach came off the bench to rally the Cowboys who would put up 17 unanswered points and ultimately win the matchup 30–28. Gossett would put up 4 extra points in the loss, but crucially missed both field-goal attempts in the loss.

==== 1973 ====
In 1973, Gossett would have his best season in field goal percentage, putting up a career high 26 of 33 field-goal attempts made, as well as all 26 extra-point attempts. He had a 54-yard field goal, which was the longest in the NFL that year, and his 78.8 field goal percentage also led the league. The 49ers would ultimately miss the playoffs after putting up a 5–9 record, having lost 6 of their last 8 games. He served as an NFL player representative in 1973 and 1974. On September 23, 1973, he kicked a 49ers then-record five field goals in a game (along with three extra points).

==== 1974 ====
In 1974, Gossett's final season, he would make just 11 of 24 field-goal attempts, as well as 25 of his 27 field-goal attempts. The 49ers would miss the playoffs for a second straight season, putting up a 6–8 record after losing 7 straight games during the season.

Gossett's nickname was "The Boomer".

== Honors ==
Gossett was named first-team All-Conference by The Sporting News in 1964, 1966 and 1973, and was named first-team All-Conference by Pro Football Weekly in 1973.

== Legacy ==
Following the end of the 1974 season, Gossett would retire from playing in the NFL. In his career, he scored 1,031 points, and was 7th on the NFL's all-time scoring list when he retired. Alongside Gino Cappelletti and George Blanda, Gossett was one of just three players with six seasons of 100 points scored in pro football history.

As of 2026, he is 70th all-time in scoring. He is 58th all-time in extra points made (as of 2026). He had never missed a game during his career, having played 154 consecutive contests. He also had perfect accuracy on extra-point attempts in six seasons. Gossett had mixed success in the postseason, which saw him make just six of 15 field goals in seven games while also making each of his 13 extra point attempts.

**Bold**	Career high

=== Regular season ===
Year	Team	GP	Overall FGs				PATs			Points
Year	Team	GP	Lng	FGM	FGA	Pct	XPM	XPA	Pct	Points
1964	LAR	14	44	18	24	75.0	31	33	93.9	85
1965	LAR	14	49	15	26	57.7	30	32	93.8	75
1966	LAR	14	48	28	49	57.1	29	29	**100.0**	**113**
1967	LAR	14	47	20	43	46.5	**48**	**48**	**100.0**	108
1968	LAR	14	37	17	31	54.8	37	37	**100.0**	88
1969	LAR	14	44	22	34	64.7	36	36	**100.0**	102
1970	SF	14	48	21	31	67.7	39	41	95.1	102
1971	SF	14	48	23	36	63.9	32	32	**100.0**	101
1972	SF	14	50	18	29	62.1	41	42	97.6	95
1973	SF	14	**54**	26	33	**78.8**	26	26	**100.0**	104
1974	SF	14	46	11	24	45.8	25	27	92.6	58
Career		154	54	219	360	60.8	374	383	97.7	1031

=== Postseason ===
Year	Team	GP	Overall FGs				PATs			Points
Year	Team	GP	Lng	FGM	FGA	Pct	XPM	XPA	Pct	Points
1967	LAR	1	—	0	3	0.0	1	1	**100.0**	1
1969	LAR	1	27	2	3	**66.7**	2	2	**100.0**	8
1970	SF	**2**	**40**	2	4	50.0	3	3	**100.0**	9
1971	SF	**2**	28	2	3	**66.7**	3	3	**100.0**	9
1972	SF	1	—	0	2	0.0	4	4	**100.0**	4
Career		7	40	6	15	40.0	13	13	100.0	31

== Personal life ==
During his playing career, Gossett worked for Moody Funds in the off-season. After retiring, he managed national advertising for a San Francisco Bay Area television station. A golf tournament benefitting the March of Dimes was named in his honor and occurred for 14 years, the “Bruce Gossett Celebrity Golf Tournament”.

== Death ==
Gossett died of natural causes on January 27, 2025, at his home in Rancho Murieta, California.
