= Dick Bass =

American football player (1937–2006)

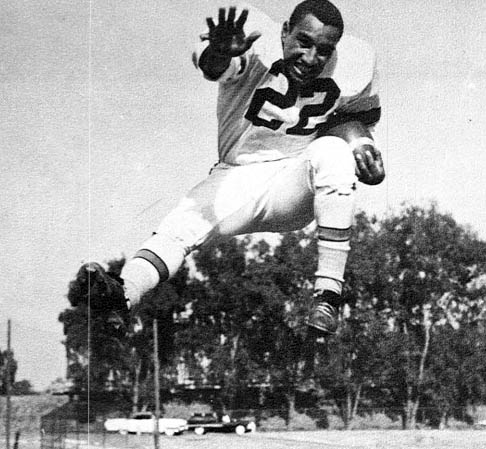
- Bass with the Pacific Tigers

No. 22
- Position: Fullback

Personal information
- Born: March 15, 1937; Georgetown, Mississippi, U.S.
- Died: February 1, 2006 (aged 68); Norwalk, California, U.S.
- Listed height: 5 ft 10 in (1.78 m)
- Listed weight: 200 lb (91 kg)

Career information
- High school: Vallejo (Vallejo, California)
- College: Pacific (1956–1958)
- NFL draft: 1959: 1st round, 2nd overall pick
- AFL draft: 1960: 1st round

Career history
- Los Angeles Rams (1960–1969)

Awards and highlights
- NFL Comeback Player of the Year (1966); Second-team All-Pro (1962, 1966); 3× Pro Bowl (1962, 1963, 1966); Second-team All-American (1958); 2× First-team All-PCC (1958, 1959); Pacific Tigers No. 22 retired

Career NFL statistics
- Rushing yards: 5,417
- Rushing average: 4.4
- Rushing touchdowns: 34
- Receptions: 204
- Receiving yards: 1,841
- Receiving touchdowns: 7
- Stats at Pro Football Reference

Richard Lee Bass (March 15, 1937 – February 1, 2006) was an American professional football player who was a fullback for the Los Angeles Rams of the National Football League (NFL) from 1960 to 1969. He played college football for the Pacific Tigers.

== Early life and education ==
Born in Georgetown, Mississippi, in 1937, Bass moved as a youth with his family in the Great Migration to California, where they settled in Vallejo. He had a brother, professional athlete Norm Bass and a sister, Dorothy. Many migrants from the South were attracted to the jobs in defense-related industries and other opportunities.

Bass played football and other varsity sports for Vallejo High School in the old North Bay League. Bass blossomed as a three-sport star at Vallejo High, where he ran for 3,690 yards and scored 68 touchdowns in 18 games. Bass scored a state-record 37 touchdowns in 1954, when he led the Apaches to an undefeated season at 9–0. The team averaged 54 points per game in 1954.

Bass went on to star at College of the Pacific (now University of the Pacific). Time magazine described him as a "One-Man Show" in 1958, after he ran for 700 yards in six games to become the season's leading NCAA ground gainer, while passing for the Tigers as well. He was a 1958 All-American. As a senior in 1958, Bass led the nation in rushing with 1,361 yards, including a dazzling display in the season opener in Berkeley, where he gained 215 yards and scored one touchdown in the Tigers' win over a Cal team that would reach the 1959 Rose Bowl. Bass was named to The Pigskin Club of Washington, D.C. National Intercollegiate All-American Football Players Honor Roll.

== Professional career ==
After being taken by the Rams as the second pick in the 1959 NFL draft, Bass was selected for the Pro Bowl three times, in 1962, 1963, and 1966. He rushed for 1,000 yards in a season two times (1962 and 1966). He finished his career with the Rams in 1969 with 5,417 yards rushing, the most among active players.

Following his retirement, he did some work with the NFL alumni association. He also made appearances in TV commercials. He worked as a color analyst on Rams radio broadcasts from 1977 to 1986. He also worked as executive director of the Greater Norwalk Chamber of Commerce (1990–2004). He died at his home at age 68 in Norwalk, California.

Kody Scott, alias Sanyika Shakur, a Los Angeles gang member known as "Monster" reported in his 1998 autobiography that his mother had identified Bass as his father.

== NFL career statistics ==
Legend
	Led the league
**Bold**	Career high

=== Regular season ===
Year	Team	Games		Rushing					Receiving				
Year	Team	GP	GS	Att	Yds	Avg	Lng	TD	Rec	Yds	Avg	Lng	TD
1960	RAM	12	4	31	153	4.9	33	0	13	92	7.1	26	0
1961	RAM	14	9	98	608	**6.2**	**73**	4	16	145	9.1	37	0
1962	RAM	14	13	196	1,033	5.3	57	6	30	262	8.7	33	**2**
1963	RAM	12	10	143	520	3.6	51	5	30	**348**	**11.6**	**53**	0
1964	RAM	9	7	72	342	4.8	59	2	9	83	9.2	24	0
1965	RAM	12	8	121	549	4.5	49	2	21	230	11.0	36	**2**
1966	RAM	14	14	**248**	**1,090**	4.4	50	**8**	**31**	274	8.8	40	0
1967	RAM	14	14	187	627	3.4	27	6	27	212	7.9	30	1
1968	RAM	10	10	121	494	4.1	20	1	27	195	7.2	28	**2**
1969	RAM	1	0	1	1	1.0	1	0	0	0	0.0	0	0
		112	89	1,218	5,417	4.4	73	34	204	1,841	9.0	53	7

=== Playoffs ===
Year	Team	Games		Rushing					Receiving				
Year	Team	GP	GS	Att	Yds	Avg	Lng	TD	Rec	Yds	Avg	Lng	TD
1967	RAM	1	1	14	40	2.9	15	0	0	0	0.0	0	0
		1	1	14	40	2.9	15	0	0	0	0.0	0	0

== Legacy and honors ==
- 1983 – Inducted as a Charter Member of the Pacific Athletics Hall of Fame.
- 2005 – Inducted into the Bay Area Sports Hall of Fame.
- May 25, 2012 – Vallejo High School football practice field was officially dedicated as "Dick Bass Field".
- No. 22 retired by Pacific Tigers.

== See also ==
- List of NCAA major college football yearly rushing leaders
- List of NCAA major college football yearly scoring leaders
- List of NCAA major college football yearly total offense leaders
