= Fred Brown (linebacker) =

American football player (born 1943)

No. 81, 55, 87
- Positions: Linebacker, Tight end

Personal information
- Born: May 4, 1943 (age 83); Honolulu, Hawaii, U.S.
- Listed height: 6 ft 4 in (1.93 m)
- Listed weight: 240 lb (109 kg)

Career information
- High school: La Sierra (Carmichael, California)
- College: American River (1961–1962); Miami (FL) (1963–1964)
- NFL draft: 1965: 3rd round, 37th overall pick
- AFL draft: 1965: 8th round, 63rd overall pick

Career history
- Los Angeles Rams (1965); Philadelphia Eagles (1967–1969)

Career NFL statistics
- Interceptions: 2
- Receptions: 1
- Receiving yards: 20
- Stats at Pro Football Reference

Fred Richert Brown (born May 4, 1943) is an American former professional football player in the National Football League (NFL). He played college football as an end for the Miami Hurricanes and was captain of their 1964 team. He then played in the NFL as a linebacker and tight end from 1965 to 1969, appearing in 40 games.

== Early life and college ==
Brown was born in Honolulu in 1943. His father was serving there with the Army Air Corps. After starting his collegiate career at American River Junior College in Sacramento, California, he played college football as an end at the University of Miami for the Hurricanes in 1963 and 1964. He was selected as captain of Miami's 1964 team.

== Professional career ==
He was selected by the Los Angeles Rams in the third round (37th overall pick) of the 1965 NFL draft. He was moved by the Rams to the linebacker position. Brown recalled that he had never played linebacker and "got burned a number of times." He appeared in 14 games for the Rams in 1965, five as a starter.

In March 1966, Brown and Frank Molden were traded to the Philadelphia Eagles in exchange for Maxie Baughan. Brown tore cartilage in his left knee in a preseason game, underwent surgery, and missed the entire 1966 season. He returned from the injury to play for the Eagles from 1967 to 1969, appearing in 26 games. His career ended in November 1969 when he injured his right knee during a workout at Franklin Field. He attempted a comeback in 1970 but was cut by the Eagles in September 1970.

Brown recorded one career reception for 20 yards and two career interceptions.
