= Mike Ciccolella =

American football player (born 1943)

No. 58
- Position: Linebacker

Personal information
- Born: October 19, 1943 (age 83); Follansbee, West Virginia, U.S.
- Listed height: 6 ft 0 in (1.83 m)
- Listed weight: 225 lb (102 kg)

Career information
- High school: St. Anthony's (Follansbee)
- College: Dayton (1961-1965)
- NFL draft: 1965: 18th round, 239th overall pick
- AFL draft: 1965: Red Shirt 12th round, 94th overall pick

Career history
- New York Giants (1966–1968)

Career NFL statistics
- Interceptions: 1
- Fumble recoveries: 1
- Sacks: 1
- Stats at Pro Football Reference

Michael Eugene Ciccolella (born October 19, 1943) is an American former professional football player who was a linebacker with the New York Giants of the National Football League (NFL) from 1966 to 1968. He played college football with the Dayton Flyers.

Born in Follansbee, West Virginia, Ciccolella attended St. Anthony's High School before being recruited to the University of Dayton in 1960. He played for the school's football team from 1962 to 1964, serving as a captain in his final season. In the 1965 NFL draft, the Giants selected Ciccolella in the 18th round with the 239th overall pick. During the 1966 season, Ciccolella's first year with the Giants, they made him their starting middle linebacker. After playing in all 14 games that year, Ciccolella participated in only 7 the following season, having suffered an ankle injury in a preseason game. He lost his role as a starter because of the injury; for 1968, he was behind Henry Davis on the Giants' depth chart. In 14 games in 1968, Ciccolella had one interception in a game against the New Orleans Saints, which he returned for seven yards. The Giants waived Ciccolella before the 1969 season; in his three-year career he played in 35 games.
