= Greenwood Memorial Park (Renton, Washington) =

Cemetery in Renton, Washington

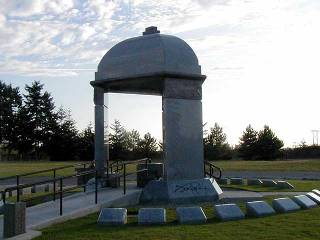
- Jimi Hendrix memorial in 2006
- Interactive map of Greenwood Memorial Park

Details
- Established: 1910
- Location: 350 Monroe Avenue Northeast; Renton, Washington, U.S.
- Coordinates: 47.48787°N 122.17151°W
- Owned by: Dignity Memorial
- Website: Greenwood Memorial Park
- Find a Grave: Greenwood Memorial Park

Greenwood Memorial Park is a cemetery in the northwest United States, located in Renton, Washington, a suburb southeast of Seattle. It is notable as the resting place of rock guitarist Jimi Hendrix (1942–1970), a Seattle native; over 14,000 fans visit his memorial annually.

Also interred at Greenwood are professional football players Clancy Williams (1942–1986) and Nesby Glasgow (1957–2020).
