= Dave Hathcock =

American football player (born 1943)

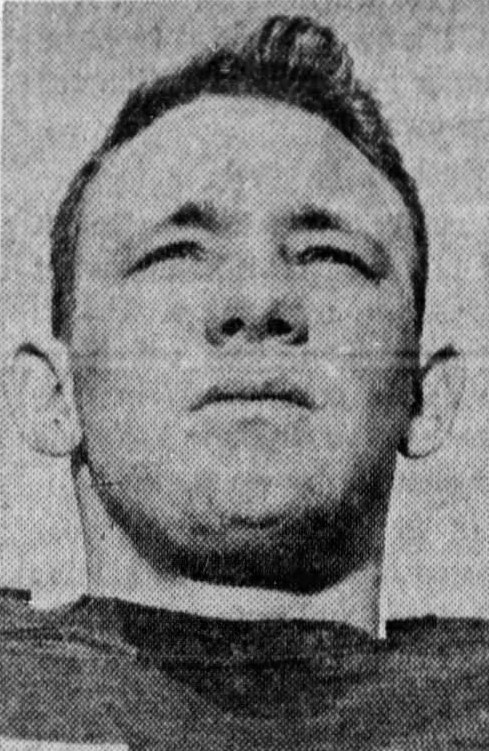
- Hathcock in 1966

No. 45, 46
- Position: Defensive back

Personal information
- Born: July 20, 1943 (age 83); Memphis, Tennessee, U.S.
- Listed height: 6 ft 0 in (1.83 m)
- Listed weight: 195 lb (88 kg)

Career information
- High school: Kingsbury (Memphis)
- College: Memphis (1965)
- NFL draft: 1966: 17th round, 258th overall pick

Career history
- Green Bay Packers (1966); New York Giants (1967)

Awards and highlights
- Super Bowl champion (I); NFL champion (1966)

Career NFL statistics
- Return yards: 322
- Stats at Pro Football Reference

David Gary Hathcock (born July 20, 1943) is an American former professional football player who was a defensive back in the National Football League (NFL).

== Biography ==
David Gary Hathcock was a student at Kingsbury High School. He attended Memphis State University, gaining entrance, in 1961, on the university's first track and field scholarship, specializing in hurdles and jumping events. Needing to stay an extra year at the college, after the end of his scholarship, he switched to playing college football as a linebacker for the Memphis Tigers.

Hathcock was selected by the Green Bay Packers in the 17th round (258th overall) of the 1966 NFL draft. With the Packers, he was on the champion team of Super Bowl I. However, he only played one season with the Packers as a reserve defensive back, and was traded to the New York Giants in 1967. He played for the Giants, until 1969.

After his sporting career he taught and couched in Nashville, Tennessee. In the year 2000 he was inducted into the Memphis Tigers Hall of Fame. As of 2015, he had retired.
