= Joe Carollo (American football) =

American football player (born 1940)

No. 63, 76, 70, 71
- Position: Offensive tackle

Personal information
- Born: March 25, 1940; Wyandotte, Michigan, U.S.
- Died: December 15, 2025 (aged 85)
- Listed height: 6 ft 2 in (1.88 m)
- Listed weight: 265 lb (120 kg)

Career information
- High school: Roosevelt (Wyandotte)
- College: Notre Dame (1958-1961)
- NFL draft: 1962: 2nd round, 16th overall pick
- AFL draft: 1962: 18th round, 139th overall pick

Career history
- Los Angeles Rams (1962–1968); Philadelphia Eagles (1969–1970); Los Angeles Rams (1971); Cleveland Browns (1972–1973); Southern California Sun (1974-1975)

Awards and highlights
- Pro Bowl (1968)

Career NFL statistics
- Games played: 150
- Games started: 118
- Fumble recoveries: 6
- Stats at Pro Football Reference

Joseph Paul Carollo (March 25, 1940 - December 15, 2025) was an American former professional football player who was an offensive tackle for 12 seasons in the National Football League (NFL) for the Los Angeles Rams, Philadelphia Eagles, and the Cleveland Browns. He played college football for the Notre Dame Fighting Irish and was selected in the second round of the 1962 NFL draft. Carollo was also selected in the eighteenth round of the 1962 AFL draft by the Dallas Texans. He had a short career in professional wrestling from 1965 to 1967 where he worked in Texas, Hawaii, the Carolinas and Japan.

== Early life ==
Carollo was born on March 25, 1940, in Wyandotte, Michigan. He attended Roosevelt High School in Wyandotte. He played on the school's football team and was also a member of the crew team.

== College ==
Carollo attend the University of Notre Dame, where he played offensive tackle on the Fighting Irish football team, as well as playing on defense, under head coach Joe Kuharich. As a senior, he was 6 ft 2 in (1.88 m) and 235 pounds (106.6 kg).

As a sophomore in 1959, Carollo was to be a backup to left tackle Joe Scibelli, who later would be his offensive linemate for eight years on the Los Angeles Rams (1962-68, 1971). He became a starter that year when Scibelli did not play because of academic issues. Scibelli subsequently transferred to American International College, and did not return to the Fighting Irish. As a junior, Carollo played the most minutes of any Fighting Irish tackle in 1960. On defense, he was Notre Dame's most effective tackler, with 30 tackles in 1960 and 40 in 1961, with two fumble recoveries.

Oklahoma University team captain and defensive tackle Billy White said of Carollo before facing him in a 1961 game, "'I've been watching him in films all week and he doesn't do anything special .... He's just big and mean'". Carollo was an Associated Press (AP) honorable mention All-American in 1961. Carollo was selected to play offensive tackle in the December 1961 East-West Shrine game. In 1962, Carollo was selected to play in the second annual All-America game, as was Notre Dame teammate Nick Buoniconti.

Another one of Carollo's offensive linemates at Notre Dame was future NFL linebacker and Los Angeles Rams teammate Myron Pottios; with Carollo playing left tackle for the Fighting Irish and Pottios next to him at left guard. Future NFL Pro Football Hall of Fame linebacker Nick Buoniconti played right guard on the line with Carollo at Notre Dame.

== Professional football career ==
The Los Angeles Rams selected Carollo in the second round of the 1962 NFL draft, 16th overall. The Dallas Texans (later the Kansas City Chiefs) selected him in the 18th round of the 1962 AFL draft, 139th overall. Carollo chose the Rams.

Carollo played with the Rams from 1962 to 1968, and again in 1971. He started seven games in 1962, and was the Rams full time starter at left tackle from 1963 to 1968. He was selected to the Pro Bowl in 1968. Between 1963 and late November 1965, over a 37-game stretch, Carollo did not miss a single offensive play. His fellow starting Rams linemates during the 1962 to 1968 time period included, among others, Joe Scibelli at right guard and Charlie Cowan at left guard and right tackle over that period; future Hall of Famer Tom Mack at left guard from 1966 to 1968; and Ken Iman at center from 1965 to 1968. Don Chuy, who would become Carollo's professional wrestling partner, started a combined 14 games at left guard next to Carollo over the 1965 and 1966 seasons.

In 1969, the Philadelphia Eagles future Hall of Fame offensive tackle Bob Brown demanded a trade. The Eagles traded Brown and cornerback Jim Nettles to the Rams for Carollo, Chuy and defensive back Irv Cross. Carollo was the Eagles starting right tackle in 1969 and 1970. Before the start of the 1971 season, the Rams traded a draft pick to the Eagles for Carollo to bolster their offensive line; however, he did not start any games for the Rams in 1971.

Carollo was waived by the Rams in November 1972, without playing a game for them, and was then signed by the Cleveland Browns. He only played in two games for the Browns after being activated from the taxi squad in early December, with no starts. Carollo's final NFL season came in 1973, appearing in 12 games for the Browns, but again with no starts.

In 1974, he joined the Southern California Sun of the new World Football League (WFL), and played for the Sun during the WFL's not quite two-year existence. After the WFL's demise, Carollo joined a number of former WFL players as actors in the 1976 film Two Minute Warning.

Early in his Rams career, Carollo received the nickname "Jet" because he missed a flight home after a game, and had to catch a jet to join up with the team.

== Professional wrestling career ==
In 1964-65, Carollo and Rams teammate Don Chuy began pursuing professional wrestling careers, after trying out with Jules Strongbow. While they originally thought this would be an easy way to make extra money, they found out that wrestling would be physically demanding. Strongbow worked with them for a considerable time before they contracted for their first match in late 1964. Carollo would team with Chuy during most of his three-year wrestling career. While demanding, off-season wrestling kept them in shape for the football season.

One of Chuy's earliest bouts was in San Diego against the AFL San Diego Chargers tackle Ernie Ladd. Carollo and Chuy made their Los Angeles wrestling debut in early March 1965, against Don Savage and Art Mahalik (a former San Francisco 49er). They were known as the Rasslin' Rams. During the 1965 off-season, Carollo made his professional wrestling debut in San Diego.

Carollo also worked in Texas, Hawaii, and the Mid-Atlantic with Chuy. Among Carollo's hundreds of bouts over three years, in an April 1965 match in Fort Worth, Texas, he partnered with Cowboy Bob Ellis and Ciclon Negro against Jack Dalton, Killer Karl Kox and Jim Dalton. In March 1966, Carollo and Chuy faced The Skulls in Asheville, North Carolina. In an April 1966 bout in Honolulu, Carollo faced Beauregarde in a three-fall match. After the end of the 1966 football season, in 1967, they wrestled six days a week for four months in places such as Greenville, South Carolina, Raleigh, North Carolina and Lynchburg, Virginia. In February 1967, Carollo wrestled against Mahalik in San Bernardino, California in what was billed as "The Battle of the NFL".

In the Summer of 1965, Mr. Moto arranged for Carollo and Chuy to wrestle in Japan the following Spring, along with Eddie Graham, Sammy Steamboat and Killer Karl Kox, working for Japan Pro Wrestling Alliance. After the 1965 football season ended, Carollo and Chuy wrestled for three months in the Carolinas, and then went on to wrestle in Hawaii and Japan.

Unlike in America, where they were good guys (faces), in Japan Carollo and Chuy were villains (heels). After one match in Japan, they had to swing chairs to escape a hostile crowd, and would often have to flee arenas directly to waiting cabs to make their escape, without using the dressing room. He teamed with Killer Karl Kox. On May 23, 1966, Carollo and Kox defeated Giant Baba and Michiaki Yoshimura to win the All Asia Tag Team Championship. Five days later they dropped the titles to Yoshimura and Hiro Matsuda. He returned to the States and reunited with Chuy in the Mid-Atlantic where he retired in 1967.

== Championships and accomplishments ==
- Japan Wrestling Association

- All Asia Tag Team Championship (1 time) - with Killer Karl Kox

== See also ==
- List of gridiron football players who became professional wrestlers
