= Wallace Dickey =

American football player (born 1941)

No. 67, 71
- Position: Offensive tackle

Personal information
- Born: February 15, 1941 (age 85); San Antonio, Texas, U.S.
- Listed height: 6 ft 3 in (1.91 m)
- Listed weight: 260 lb (118 kg)

Career information
- High school: Harlandale (San Antonio)
- College: Texas State (1962–1964)
- NFL draft: 1965: 15th round, 207th overall pick

Career history

Playing
- Toronto Argonauts (1965); Orlando Panthers (1966–1967); Denver Broncos (1968–1969); Pittsburgh Steelers (1970)*; Orlando Panthers (1970)
- * Offseason or practice squad member only

Coaching
- Orlando Panthers (1966–1967) Offensive line coach

Career AFL statistics
- Games played: 22
- Fumble recoveries: 1
- Stats at Pro Football Reference

Wallace Dickey (born February 15, 1941) is an American former professional football player who was a tackle for the Denver Broncos of the American Football League (AFL) from 1968 to 1969. Dickey attended Harlandale Independent School District in San Antonio, Texas, and played college football for the Texas State Bobcats. He played two seasons for the Broncos and appeared in 22 games.

He died August 26, 2022.
