= Henry Dyer (American football) =

American football player (born 1945)

No. 35, 32
- Position: Running back

Personal information
- Born: January 28, 1945 (age 81); Baton Rouge, Louisiana, U.S.
- Listed height: 6 ft 2 in (1.88 m)
- Listed weight: 230 lb (104 kg)

Career information
- High school: Chaneyville (Zachary, Louisiana)
- College: Grambling State (1962-1965)
- NFL draft: 1966: 4th round, 50th overall pick

Career history
- Los Angeles Rams (1966–1968); New York Giants (1969)*; Washington Redskins (1969–1970); Cincinnati Bengals (1971)*; Chicago Bears (1971)*; Denver Broncos (1972)*
- * Offseason or practice squad member only

Career NFL statistics
- Rushing yards: 256
- Rushing average: 3.1
- Receptions: 14
- Receiving yards: 160
- Total touchdowns: 2
- Stats at Pro Football Reference

Henry Louis Dyer (born January 28, 1945) is an American former professional football player who was a running back in the National Football League (NFL) for the Los Angeles Rams and the Washington Redskins. He played college football for Grambling State Tigers and was selected in the fourth round of the 1966 NFL draft.
