= Vilnis Ezerins =

Latvian gridiron football player (born 1944)

No. 37
- Position: Running back

Personal information
- Born: April 22, 1944 (age 82); Latvia
- Listed height: 6 ft 2 in (1.88 m)
- Listed weight: 217 lb (98 kg)

Career information
- High school: Union Grove (Union Grove, Wisconsin, U.S.)
- College: Wisconsin-Whitewater (1962–1965)
- NFL draft: 1966: 8th round, 112th overall pick

Career history
- Orange County Ramblers (1967); Los Angeles Rams (1968); Washington Redskins (1969)*; Miami Dolphins (1970)*
- * Offseason or practice squad member only

Career NFL statistics
- Rushing yards: 2
- Rushing average: 1
- Stats at Pro Football Reference

Vilnis Ezerins (Latvian: Vilnis Ezeriņš; born April 22, 1944) is a former running back in the National Football League (NFL). He was drafted in the eighth round of the 1966 NFL draft by the Los Angeles Rams and later played with the team during the 1968 NFL season.
