= George Burman =

American football player (born 1942)

No. 68, 51, 58
- Positions: Center, Long Snapper

Personal information
- Born: December 1, 1942 (age 83); Chicago, Illinois, U.S.
- Listed height: 6 ft 3 in (1.91 m)
- Listed weight: 255 lb (116 kg)

Career information
- High school: Whiting (Whiting, Indiana)
- College: Northwestern (1960-1963)
- NFL draft: 1964: 15th round, 210th overall pick

Career history
- Chicago Bears (1964–1965); Los Angeles Rams (1966–1970); Washington Redskins (1971–1973)

Career NFL statistics
- Games played: 85
- Games started: 3
- Stats at Pro Football Reference

George Robert Burman (born December 1, 1942) is an American former professional football player who was a center and long snapper in the National Football League (NFL). He played for the Chicago Bears, Los Angeles Rams and Washington Redskins of the National Football League (NFL). He is credited as the first specialized long snapper, somebody whose roster spot was based on the long snap, and not other positions.

He played college football for the Northwestern Wildcats and was selected in the 15th round of the 1964 NFL draft. George Allen, then the head of scouting for the Chicago Bears, selected Burman, and proceeded to bring him to the Los Angeles Rams in 1966 and the Washington Redskins in 1971.

Burman began his long snapping with the Rams, working on the punts, but was still considered a backup offensive lineman. When Allen coaxed him out of retirement in the 1971 preseason to join Washington, Burman's roster spot was based on his long snap, not his offensive line play. His final game was Super Bowl VII; he missed the entire 1973 season with an injury, and then retired.

Burman earned two advanced degrees from the University of Chicago and went on to become a professor at Syracuse University, where he spent two decades and 13 years as dean of the university’s Martin J. Whitman School of Management.
