= Steve Heckard =

American football player (born 1943)

No. 20
- Position: Wide receiver

Personal information
- Born: April 12, 1943 (age 83); Winston-Salem, North Carolina
- Listed height: 6 ft 1 in (1.85 m)
- Listed weight: 195 lb (88 kg)

Career information
- High school: Winston-Salem (NC) R. J. Reynolds
- College: USC, Davidson

Career history
- Los Angeles Rams (1965–1966)
- Stats at Pro Football Reference

Steve Heckard (born April 12, 1943) is an American former football wide receiver. He played in 25 games for the Los Angeles Rams from 1965 to 1966.
