= Clancy Williams =

American football player (1942–1986)

No. 24, 41
- Position: Cornerback

Personal information
- Born: September 24, 1942; Beaumont, Texas, U.S.
- Died: September 21, 1986 (aged 43); Seattle, Washington, U.S.
- Listed height: 6 ft 3 in (1.91 m)
- Listed weight: 194 lb (88 kg)

Career information
- High school: Renton (WA)
- College: Washington State (1961-1964)
- NFL draft: 1965: 1st round, 9th overall pick
- AFL draft: 1965: 8th round, 62nd overall pick

Career history
- Los Angeles Rams (1965–1972); Portland Storm (1974); Florida Blazers (1974)

Awards and highlights
- First-team All-American (1964); First-team All-PCC (1964); Second-team All-PCC (1963)

Career NFL statistics
- Interceptions: 28
- Fumble recoveries: 7
- Total touchdowns: 2
- Stats at Pro Football Reference

Clarence "Clancy" Williams Jr. (September 24, 1942 – September 21, 1986) was an American football defensive back who played eight seasons in the National Football League (NFL), all with the Los Angeles Rams.

== Early life ==
Williams was born on September 24, 1942, in Beaumont, or Deweyville, Texas. Williams was raised in suburban Seattle and graduated from Renton High School in 1961, where he was all-state in football and basketball, and earned all-state honors on the track team. He helped Renton to a Puget Sound League football championship. Williams was the only black player on his team. While some players bullied him for this, his mother encouraged him not to allow them to degrade him.

The City of Renton made March 27, 1965, Clancy Williams Day. Williams is among seven legendary Renton athletes depicted on a mural at Liberty Park in the back of Giannini Stadium in Renton.

== College career ==
He played college football at Washington State University (WSU) in Pullman, and was its star running back and a defensive back from 1962–64. He was a first-team All-American at defensive back as a senior in 1964. In 1964, he rushed for 783 yards in 147 attempts, and had 17 receptions for 210 yards. In his three years of varsity football, he had 1,456 rushing yards, 332 receiving yards, and 719 yards on kickoff returns. In 1964, he also led the Athletic Association of Western Universities in rushing yards per attempt (5.3).

Williams played on both sides of the ball: on offense at halfback and defense at cornerback. WSU sports historian Dick Fry made the case Williams was the finest two-way player in Washington State history. He played in the 1965 Hula Bowl, East-West Shrine game, and Chicago College All Star Game against the Cleveland Browns. He was inducted into Washington State's Hall of Fame in 1986.

His most famous college play came in WSU's 1964 opening game against Stanford. With little more than one minute left in the game, WSU was down 23–22. A Stanford receiver caught a pass, and when he turned to run upfield, Williams stripped the ball away and took it to WSU's 37 yard line. WSU scored a touchdown, winning the game 29–23.

== Professional career ==
He was selected in the first round of the 1965 NFL draft (ninth overall) by the Rams. Williams played his entire eight-year NFL career as a defensive back with the Rams. In the five years from 1966 to 1970, he started 68 or the team's 70 games at left cornerback, with 28 interceptions, two of which he returned for touchdowns. In 1966, his eight interceptions were tied for second most in the NFL, and his seven interceptions in 1968 were tied for fourth best in the NFL.

At the time Williams retired after 1972, he had 28 interceptions for the Rams, two returned for touchdowns. His 28 interceptions for the Rams were second most in team history when he retired, behind teammate Eddie Meador (46). Through 2024, he is tied for fifth all-time on the Rams interception list, while Meador still remains first. He also returned kickoffs for the Rams, chiefly from 1965 to 1967; averaging over 25 yards per return.

He finished his professional football career in the World Football League.

== Personal life ==
After football, Williams worked in Los Angeles in banking and at the Los Angeles Times newspaper.

His son Clarence III also played football at Washington State for four years at tight end, and in the NFL for one year with the Cleveland Browns.

Williams had three first cousins from Beaumont who played in the NFL, Mel Farr, Miller Farr, and Jerry Levias.

== Death ==
He died of cancer in Seattle at age 43 in 1986. and was interred at Greenwood Memorial Park in Renton.
