= Dave Pivec =

American football player (1943–2024)

No. 83, 82
- Position: Tight end

Personal information
- Born: September 25, 1943; Baltimore, Maryland, U.S.
- Died: May 11, 2024 (aged 80); Hunt Valley, Maryland, U.S.
- Listed height: 6 ft 3 in (1.91 m)
- Listed weight: 240 lb (109 kg)

Career information
- High school: Patterson (Baltimore)
- College: Notre Dame
- NFL draft: 1965: 14th round, 185th overall pick

Career history
- Los Angeles Rams (1966–1968); Denver Broncos (1969)

Awards and highlights
- National champion (1964)
- Stats at Pro Football Reference

David John Pivec (September 25, 1943 – May 11, 2024) was an American professional football player who was a tight end in the National Football League (NFL) and American Football League (AFL) for the Los Angeles Rams and Denver Broncos. He played college football for the Notre Dame Fighting Irish. He also played in the Canadian Football League (CFL) for the Toronto Argonauts and Ottawa Rough Riders. The MIAA Football A Conference Dave Pivec MVP Award was established and presented on November 18, 2022, to Hakim Simms of Archbishop Spalding High School. He was the first player to receive the annual award after a masterful performance against Calvert Hall in the MIAA A Conference Championship. Archbishop Spalding won the game 34-10, and Dave Pivec's family (Brock Pivec, Grant Pivec, and Benjamin Stamp) presented the award with this heartwarming video honoring the Baltimore legend himself. Pivec died in Hunt Valley, Maryland, on May 11, 2024, at the age of 80.
