= Kelton Winston =

American football player (1939–1980)

No. 22, 47
- Position: Defensive back

Personal information
- Born: October 22, 1939; Corsicana, Texas, U.S.
- Died: November 30, 1980 (aged 41); Los Angeles, California, U.S.
- Listed height: 6 ft 0 in (1.83 m)
- Listed weight: 195 lb (88 kg)

Career information
- High school: Fort Worth (TX) I.M. Terrell
- College: Wiley
- NFL draft: 1962: 9th round, 119th overall pick

Career history
- Springfield Acorns (1964); Los Angeles Rams (1967–1968)

Career NFL statistics
- Fumble recoveries: 2
- Stats at Pro Football Reference

Kelton Winston (October 22, 1939 – November 30, 1980) was an American football defensive back. He played for the Los Angeles Rams from 1967 to 1968.
