= Mike Dennis (running back) =

American football player (born 1944)

No. 43
- Position: Running back

Personal information
- Born: July 22, 1944 (age 82); Philadelphia, Mississippi, U.S.
- Listed height: 6 ft 1 in (1.85 m)
- Listed weight: 207 lb (94 kg)

Career information
- High school: Jackson (MS) Murrah
- College: Mississippi (1962-1965)
- NFL draft: 1966: 3rd round, 33rd overall pick
- AFL draft: 1966: 1st round, 8th overall pick

Career history
- Los Angeles Rams (1968–1969)

Awards and highlights
- Super Bowl champion (II); 2× First-team All-SEC (1964, 1965)

Career NFL statistics
- Rushing yards: 136
- Rushing average: 4.7
- Receptions: 8
- Receiving yards: 53
- Stats at Pro Football Reference

Walter Michael Dennis (born July 22, 1944) is an American former professional football player who was a running back for the Los Angeles Rams of the National Football League (NFL). He played college football for the Ole Miss Rebels before playing in the NFL with the Los Angeles Rams in 1968 and 1969. Dennis was selected by the Buffalo Bills in the first round (eighth overall) of the American Football League (AFL) 1966 draft. He was also drafted by the Atlanta Falcons in the third round (33rd overall) of the 1966 NFL draft.
