= Jon Kilgore =

American football player (1943–2020)

No. 13, 80, 15
- Position: Punter

Personal information
- Born: December 3, 1943; Fort Jackson, South Carolina
- Died: April 14, 2020 (aged 76); Braselton, Georgia

Career information
- College: Auburn University

Career history
- 1965–1967: Los Angeles Rams
- 1968: Chicago Bears
- 1969: San Francisco 49ers
- Stats at Pro Football Reference

Jon Wilton Kilgore (December 3, 1943 – April 14, 2020) was an American football punter who played for five seasons for the Los Angeles Rams, Chicago Bears, and San Francisco 49ers.

He died on April 14, 2020, in Atlanta, Georgia at age 76.
