= Frank Molden =

American football player (1942–2023)

No. 78, 74, 73
- Position: Defensive tackle

Personal information
- Born: July 28, 1942; Moss Point, Mississippi, U.S.
- Died: January 6, 2023 (aged 80); Moss Point, Mississippi, U.S.
- Listed height: 6 ft 5 in (1.96 m)
- Listed weight: 276 lb (125 kg)

Career information
- High school: Magnolia (Moss Point)
- College: Jackson State (1961–1964)
- NFL draft: 1965: 11th round, 143rd overall pick
- AFL draft: 1965: 5th round, 34th overall pick

Career history
- Los Angeles Rams (1965); Philadelphia Eagles (1968); Atlanta Falcons (1969)*; New York Giants (1969); Jersey Tigers (1970)
- * Offseason or practice squad member only

Career NFL statistics
- Fumble recoveries: 3
- Interceptions: 1
- Sacks: 3.5
- Stats at Pro Football Reference

William Francis Molden (July 28, 1942 – January 6, 2023) was an American football defensive tackle in the National Football League (NFL) for the Los Angeles Rams, the Philadelphia Eagles, and the New York Giants. He played college football at Jackson State University and was drafted in the eleventh round of the 1965 NFL draft by the Pittsburgh Steelers. Molden was also selected in the fifth round of the 1965 AFL draft by the Houston Oilers.

Molden was the husband of Ruth Molden of Moss Point, Mississippi and they had three children. Molden died on January 6, 2023, at the age of 80.
