= Frank Marchlewski =

American football player (1943–2016)

No. 52, 53, 56, 57
- Position: Center

Personal information
- Born: October 14, 1943; New Kensington, Pennsylvania, U.S.
- Died: October 27, 2016 (aged 73); Pittsburgh, Pennsylvania, U.S.
- Listed height: 6 ft 2 in (1.88 m)
- Listed weight: 240 lb (109 kg)

Career information
- High school: Glen Burnie (MD)
- College: Minnesota (1961-1964)
- NFL draft: 1965: 5th round, 60th overall pick
- AFL draft: 1965: 19th round, 152nd overall pick

Career history
- Los Angeles Rams (1965); Atlanta Falcons (1966–1968); Los Angeles Rams (1968-1969); Buffalo Bills (1970)

Awards and highlights
- Second-team All-Big Ten (1963)

Career NFL statistics
- Games played: 74
- Games started: 42
- Fumble recoveries: 1
- Stats at Pro Football Reference

Frank Marchlewski (October 14, 1943 – October 27, 2016) was an American professional football player who was an offensive lineman for six seasons for the Los Angeles Rams, Atlanta Falcons, and Buffalo Bills.

== Buffalo Bills ==
As a member of the Bills in his final year (1970), he became their starting center, replacing Al Bemiller. However, the Bills fielded a poor team that year, with a record of 3–10–1, scoring 204 points (14.6 points/game), 23rd of 26 teams in the NFL, despite the presence of second year pro O. J. Simpson in the backfield, who rushed for 488 yards. The following year, Marchlewski was replaced by rookie Bruce Jarvis. He died on October 27, 2016, from heart problems, aged 73.
