= Gregg Schumacher =

American football player (born 1942)

No. 81
- Position: Defensive end

Personal information
- Born: June 30, 1942 (age 84); Chicago, Illinois, U.S.
- Listed height: 6 ft 2 in (1.88 m)
- Listed weight: 240 lb (109 kg)

Career information
- High school: Taft (Chicago)
- College: Illinois
- NFL draft: 1965: 13th round, 170th overall pick

Career history
- Los Angeles Rams (1967–1968)

Career NFL statistics
- Games played: 25
- Games started: 9
- Fumble recoveries: 1
- Stats at Pro Football Reference

Gregg Harold Schumacher (born June 30, 1942) is an American former professional football player who was a defensive end in the National Football League (NFL). After playing college football for the Illinois Fighting Illini, Schumacher was selected by the San Francisco 49ers in the 13th round of the 1965 NFL draft. He played two seasons for the Los Angeles Rams from 1967 to 1968.
