= Bucky Pope =

American football player (born 1941)

No. 80
- Position: Wide receiver

Personal information
- Born: March 23, 1941 (age 85); Pittsburgh, Pennsylvania, U.S.
- Listed height: 6 ft 5 in (1.96 m)
- Listed weight: 195 lb (88 kg)

Career information
- High school: Crafton (Pittsburgh)
- College: Duke (1960); Catawba (1961-1963)
- NFL draft: 1964: 8th round, 105th overall pick

Career history
- Los Angeles Rams (1964–1967); Atlanta Falcons (1968)*; Green Bay Packers (1968)
- * Offseason or practice squad member only

Career NFL statistics
- Receptions: 34
- Receiving yards: 952
- Receiving touchdowns: 13
- Stats at Pro Football Reference

Frank Buckley "Bucky" Pope (born March 23, 1941) is an American former professional football player who was a wide receiver in the National Football League (NFL) for the Los Angeles Rams and Green Bay Packers. He is mostly known for his 1964 season and nickname, "the Catawba Claw." The 31.44 yards he gained per reception that year is the second-highest for a season in NFL history. After his stellar rookie season his career was derailed due to injuries. He missed all of the 1965 season then played only 3 more years.

== Catawba College ==
Bucky was recruited to play basketball at Duke University but did not persist there due to his strong dislike of the other basketball scholarship player in his class. Academic issues may have also contributed. In any event, he decided to take his athletic talents elsewhere. After that experience he became a two sport star at nearby Catawba College (1962-1963), originally recruited for basketball he also made his mark on the football field. In basketball, he averaged 19.4 points in 61 games and in two seasons playing football caught 66 passes for nearly 1,200 yards.
