= Doug Woodlief =

American gridiron football player (born 1943)

No. 57
- Position: Linebacker

Personal information
- Born: September 4, 1943 (age 83); Marianna, Florida, U.S.
- Listed height: 6 ft 3 in (1.91 m)
- Listed weight: 225 lb (102 kg)

Career information
- High school: Marianna (FL)
- College: Memphis
- NFL draft: 1965: 5th round, 65th overall pick
- AFL draft: 1965: Red Shirt 4th round, 30th overall pick

Career history
- Los Angeles Rams (1965–1969); Calgary Stampeders (1972)
- Stats at Pro Football Reference

Douglas Eugene Woodlief (born September 4, 1943) is an American former football linebacker. He played for the Los Angeles Rams from 1965 to 1969.
