= Ken Iman =

American football player (1939–2010)

No. 53, 50
- Position: Center

Personal information
- Born: February 8, 1939 (age 87); St. Louis, Missouri, U.S.
- Died: November 13, 2010 (aged 71); Springfield, Pennsylvania, U.S.
- Listed height: 6 ft 1 in (1.85 m)
- Listed weight: 240 lb (109 kg)

Career information
- High school: Beaumont (St. Louis)
- College: Southeast Missouri State
- NFL draft: 1960: undrafted

Career history

Playing
- Green Bay Packers (1960–1963); Los Angeles Rams (1964–1974); St. Louis Cardinals (1975)*
- * Offseason or practice squad member only

Coaching
- Philadelphia Eagles (1976–1986) Offensive line coach

Awards and highlights
- 2× NFL champion (1961, 1962)

Career NFL statistics
- Games played: 194
- Games started: 144
- Fumble recoveries: 6
- Stats at Pro Football Reference

Kenneth Charles Iman (February 8, 1939 – November 13, 2010) was an American football center who played 14 seasons in the National Football League (NFL) with the Green Bay Packers and the Los Angeles Rams, from 1960 to 1974. He became an assistant coach for the Philadelphia Eagles from 1976 to 1986, and then a sales executive for the team over the following 10 years. He played under Hall of fame coaches Vince Lombardi, George Allen and Dick Vermeil, and was an assistant coach to Vermeil.

== Early life ==
Iman was born on February 8, 1939, in St. Louis, Missouri. He attended Beaumont High School, where he played on the football team alongside his brother Norman. Iman played center.

== College football ==
Iman attended Southeast Missouri State University (SMSU), and played varsity football there as a lineman, 1956-59. He played center for SMSU. He was named as center on the 1959 All-Conference team of the Missouri Intercollegiate Athletic Association (MIAA; now the Mid-America Intercollegiate Athletics Association). His brother Norman was again his teammate. He was inducted into the school's Athletics Hall of Fame in 2002.

== Professional playing career ==
=== Green Bay Packers ===
Iman was not selected in the 1960 NFL draft. He was signed by the Green Bay Packers, where he played from 1960-63. He played under Pro Football Hall of Fame coach Vince Lombardi all four years with the Packers.

He was a backup center for the Packers during his four years in Green Bay, behind future Pro Football Hall of Fame center Jim Ringo. He played special teams for the Packers, including in the 1960 NFL championship game between the Packers and Philadelphia Eagles (which the Eagles won 17–13). He also played offensive guard, and was called upon to play linebacker due to injuries on the Packers defense. He started two games each in 1961 and 1962.

The Packers won the 1961 NFL championship 37–0 over the New York Giants, and the 1962 NFL championship over the Giants 16–7. Iman played linebacker in the 1963 College All Star Game, where the Packers lost in a stunning upset to a team of college all-stars, 20–17. Lombardi called it the most embarrassing loss of his coaching career.

=== Los Angeles Rams ===
Before the 1964 season, Iman was traded to the Los Angeles Rams for quarterback Zeke Bratkowski. Iman missed the entire 1964 season with a broken ankle. He returned in 1965 as the Rams starting center, and started every Rams regular season game from 1965-74, 140 straight games. From 1966-70, the Rams were coached by future Hall of Famer George Allen.

During his entire Rams' career, Iman played on a starting offensive line that included Joe Scibelli (right guard) and Charlie Cowan (right and left tackle); that included Joe Carollo from 1965-70 (left and right tackle); and included future Hall of Fame left guard Tom Mack from 1966-74. During a 1973 game against the Houston Oilers, Iman and Mack manhandled Oilers rookie star tackle John Matuszak, who had said before the game he would sack the Rams quarterback on every pass play. Iman mentored Mack as a Rams rookie, and worked closely with Mack over their years as teammates, both in game study and side-by-side on the field. Iman gave the Hall of Fame presentation speech for Mack at his 1999 induction.

The Rams were 4–10 in Iman's first season, but only had one losing season after that until he retired. The team went to the playoffs in 1967, 1969, 1973 and 1974. The Rams lost in the divisional round the first three times, but won the 1974 divisional round playoff game against the Washington Redskins, 19–10, defeating former Rams coach George Allen. The Rams offense amassed 131 yards on the ground, with Iman, Mack, and Scibelli strong up the middle. The Rams used inexperienced quarterback James Harris in the game, and the line did not allow any quarterback sacks. Just two weeks earlier, the Rams line had given up three sacks to the Redskins (against Rams quarterback Ron Jaworski), in a 23–17 loss to Washington.

In the final game of Iman's career, the Rams lost the 1974 National Football Conference championship game to the Minnesota Vikings, 14–10. Iman was replaced in 1975 by Rich Saul, who had waited five years for the opportunity.

Iman was traded to the St. Louis Cardinals in 1975, but retired without playing for them.

In 1969, the New York Daily News named Iman second team All-Pro at center. Iman was voted team MVP in 1972. He has been listed among the top 100 players in Rams history.

== Coaching ==
In 1976, future Pro Football Hall of Fame coach Dick Vermeil became head coach of the Philadelphia Eagles. Vermeil had been offensive coordinator with the Rams in 1971-72, and he told Iman that if he ever became a head coach he would hire Iman, because he had learned so much from Iman. Iman was one of the first members of Vermeil's coaching staff, chosen by Vermeil as an offensive line coach and special teams coach. This was Iman's first coaching job. Iman remained an offensive line coach and special teams coach under Vermeil from 1976-79, and then served solely as an offensive line coach under Vermeil from 1980-82. (Vermeil himself had been the first ever special teams coach under George Allen.) The team had losing seasons in 1976-77, but had four winning seasons between 1978-1981, making the playoffs each of those years and reaching the Super Bowl in the 1980 season. He shared offensive line coaching duties with Jerry Wampfler from 1979-83.

During his time with the Eagles, he was instrumental in the development of Pro Bowl tackles Jerry Sisemore and Stan Walters. Sisemore came to the Eagles in 1973, and was the team's starting right tackle from 1973-83. It was during Iman's tenure as offensive line coach that Sisemore made the Pro Bowl in 1979 and 1981, and was named second-team All-Conference by United Press International (UPI) each of those years as well. Walters was the Eagles' left tackle from 1975-83, and was selected to the Pro Bowl in 1978-79, as well as being named second-team All-Pro by the Associated Press (AP), and first-team All-Conference by UPI and The Sporting News in 1979.

Before starting the 1976 season, Vermeil offered an open tryout to members of the public, with an opportunity to make the Eagles roster. Thirty-year old Vince Papale succeeded. Iman was one of two Eagles assistant coaches who supported adding Papale to the team in 1976. Papale played under Iman on special teams for three years (1976-78), and the two of them came up with a weekly award for the best special teams player in that week's game. The award was a tee shirt emblazoned with the words "WHO'S NUTS" on the front. Papale's unlikely story was the subject of a 2006 film, Invincible.

After Vermeil left the Eagles, Iman was retained as the Eagles' offensive line coach by new head coach Marion Campbell (1983-85), and then for one more year by the ensuing head coach Buddy Ryan (1986). After his coaching career ended, Iman served as an Eagles sales account executive for 10 years.

== Personal life ==
In obtaining his Bachelor's degree at SMSU, Iman had studied social studies and physical education. During the off-seasons from the NFL, Iman taught English and social studies at Fox High School in Arnold, Missouri.

For decades, his wife Joyce also worked for the Eagles, in finance.

== Death ==
He died on November 13, 2010, at his home in Springfield Township, Delaware County, Pennsylvania. He had ongoing complications after suffering cardiac arrest in 1999, during the ensuing years before his death.
