= Don Chuy =

American football player (1941–2014)

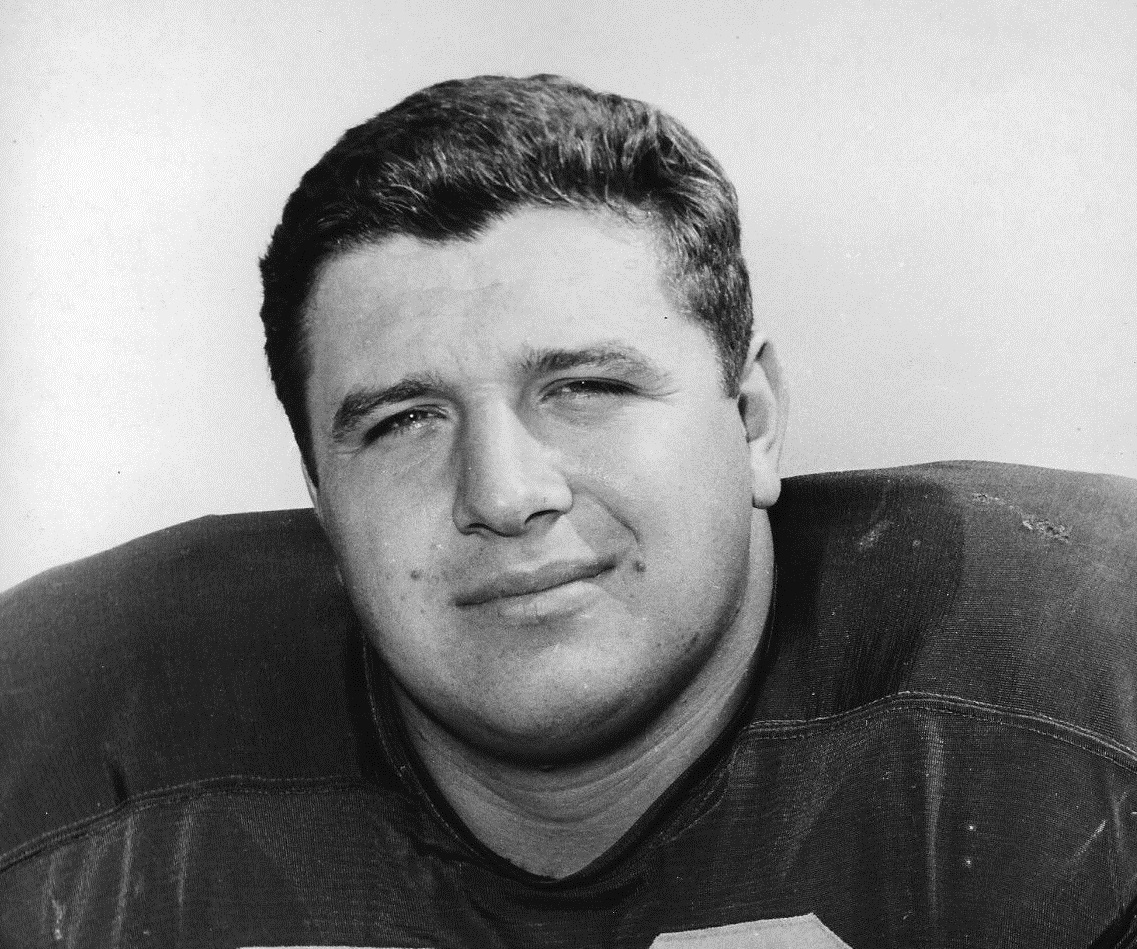
- Chuy with the Los Angeles Rams

No. 62, 66
- Position: Guard

Personal information
- Born: July 20, 1941; Newark, New Jersey, U.S.
- Died: January 6, 2014 (aged 72); Myrtle Beach, South Carolina, U.S.
- Listed height: 6 ft 0 in (1.83 m)
- Listed weight: 260 lb (118 kg)

Career information
- High school: Nutley (NJ)
- College: Clemson
- NFL draft: 1963: 5th round, 67th overall pick
- AFL draft: 1963: 5th round, 38th overall pick

Career history
- Los Angeles Rams (1963–1968); Philadelphia Eagles (1969)

Awards and highlights
- First-team All-ACC (1962)

Career NFL statistics
- Games played: 82
- Games started: 32
- Stats at Pro Football Reference

Donald John Chuy (July 20, 1941 – January 6, 2014) was an American professional football player who played guard for seven seasons for the Los Angeles Rams and the Philadelphia Eagles.

Born in Newark, New Jersey, Chuy was raised in nearby Nutley, where he attended Nutley High School.

While playing for the Rams in 1965, he and several of his teammates played cameo roles as football players in the Perry Mason episode, "The Case of the 12th Wildcat."

Chuy became a professional wrestler after his NFL career.

He died at his Myrtle Beach, South Carolina home in January 2014. He was 72.
