= Joe Scibelli =

American football player (1939–1991)

No. 71
- Positions: Tackle, guard

Personal information
- Born: April 19, 1939; Springfield, Massachusetts, U.S.
- Died: December 11, 1991 (aged 52); Boston, Massachusetts, U.S.
- Listed height: 6 ft 1 in (1.85 m)
- Listed weight: 256 lb (116 kg)

Career information
- High school: Cathedral (Springfield)
- College: Notre Dame (1957-1958); American International (1959-1960)
- NFL draft: 1961: 10th round, 130th overall pick
- AFL draft: 1961: 10th round, 77th overall pick

Career history
- Los Angeles Rams (1961–1975)

Awards and highlights
- First-team All-Pro (1973); Pro Bowl (1968)

Career NFL statistics
- Games played: 202
- Games started: 193
- Fumble recoveries: 6
- Stats at Pro Football Reference

Joseph Albert Scibelli (/ʃɪˈbɛliː/ shih-BEL-ee; April 19, 1939 – December 11, 1991) was an American professional football tackle and guard who played fifteen seasons in the National Football League (NFL) with the Los Angeles Rams.

== Early life ==
Scibelli was born on April 19, 1939, in Springfield, Massachusetts. He attended Cathedral High School, where he played on the football and hockey teams. In 1954, as a sophomore, he was the goaltender on the school's championship ice hockey team. Future NFL Hall of Fame linebacker Nick Buoniconti attended Cathedral during the same time period, where he and Scibelli were football teammates. They had competed against each other as children in organized football, but in 1955, they were linemates on an undefeated Cathedral team.

The Joe Scibelli Award is given annually to the top high school offensive lineman in the Pioneer Valley.

== College career ==
Scibelli originally attended the University of Notre Dame. He played football for the Fighting Irish beginning on the freshman team in 1957 as a 6 ft (1.83 m) 250 lb (113.4 kg) tackle, and moved up to the varsity the following year, where he had 23 tackles on defense. He helped recruit Buoniconti to Notre Dame. He did not return to Notre Dame after his sophomore year, in light of conflicts with new coach Joe Kuharich and academic issues, and he returned to Springfield. Scibelli finished his college years at American International College in Springfield.

== Professional career ==
Scibelli was taken in the 10th round of the 1961 NFL draft (130th overall) by the Los Angeles Rams. He was also taken in the 10th round of the 1961 AFL draft (77th overall) by the New York Titans (later the New York Jets).

He joined the Rams at the age of 21 in 1961 and did not leave until he was 36 years of age after the 1975 season. He played 202 games at right guard for the Rams, starting in over 190 games. He helped the Rams win the 1967 and 1969 NFC Coastal Division and the 1973-75 NFC West. He was team captain during his last ten years with the Rams. In 1973, new Rams coach Chuck Knox created a players executive committee, consisting of Scibelli, future Hall of Famers Merlin Olson and Tom Mack, Charlie Cowan, Harold Jackson, and John Hadl.

In 1961, the Rams had drafted Cowan six rounds before Scibelli. Scibelli and Cowan played together on the Rams offensive line from 1961-1975, the duration of both of their careers; with Cowan playing right tackle next to Scibelli at right guard for over four years. Mack played left guard on the same line with Scibelli and Cowan from 1966-75. Center Ken Iman played on their line from 1965-74. During their tenure with the Rams, the Rams led the NFL in scoring in 1967 and 1973; and in total yards gained and yards rushing in 1973.

Scibelli played in the Pro Bowl in 1968, and was a first-team Newspaper Enterprise Association (NEA) All-Pro selection in 1973; as well as a United Press International (UPI) second-team All-Conference selection in 1973.

In seeking an advantage against defensive linemen, Scibelli would chew on raw garlic cloves before and during games, and exhale in his opponents face immediately prior to the ball being snapped to start the play. Scibelli observed, "'Their faces would wrinkle up and they looked like they were going to throw up. ... I could blow them away with my breath.'"

In 1965, he and several of his Ram teammates had cameo roles as football players in the Perry Mason episode, "The Case of the 12th Wildcat."

After retiring, he ran a produce distributorship in Springfield.

== Death ==
He died in 1991 of cancer at the New England Baptist Hospital.
