= National Register of Historic Places listings in Lee County, Iowa =

Location of Lee County in Iowa

This is a list of the National Register of Historic Places listings in Lee County, Iowa.

This is intended to be a complete list of the properties and districts on the National Register of Historic Places in Lee County, Iowa, United States. Latitude and longitude coordinates are provided for many National Register properties and districts; these locations may be seen together in an online map.

There are 48 properties and districts listed on the National Register in the county, including 1 National Historic Landmark.

This National Park Service list is complete through NPS recent listings posted April 24, 2026.

== Current listings ==
	Name on the Register	Image	Date listed	Location	City or town	Description
1	Albright House	Albright House	July 24, 1978 (#78001233)	716-718 Ave. F 40°37′54″N 91°18′38″W	Fort Madison	
2	Atchison, Topeka and Santa Fe Passenger and Freight Complex Historic District	Atchison, Topeka and Santa Fe Passenger and Freight Complex Historic District	March 5, 1992 (#92000100)	902 Ave. H 40°37′48″N 91°18′49″W	Fort Madison	A former passenger train station and a former freight station built in 1909 by the Atchison, Topeka and Santa Fe Railway.
3	Chief Justice Joseph M. Beck House	Chief Justice Joseph M. Beck House	July 21, 1988 (#88001116)	630 Ave. E 40°37′58″N 91°18′34″W	Fort Madison	
4	Gen. William Worth Belknap House	Gen. William Worth Belknap House	October 10, 1975 (#75000694)	511 N. 3rd St. 40°23′51″N 91°22′33″W	Keokuk	Greek Revival home built in 1854 by William Worth Belknap who became a Civil War general and Secretary of War under President Ulysses S. Grant.
5	Bridgeport Bridge	Bridgeport Bridge	May 15, 1998 (#98000533)	Old Quarry Rd. 40°47′25″N 91°21′50″W	Denmark	A Pennsylvania through truss bridge built by the Clinton Bridge and Iron Works and completed in 1904. Extends into Des Moines County.
6	Hosea S. and Elizabeth Case House		November 18, 2022 (#100008390)	1452 280th Ave. 40°44′49″N 91°22′07″W	Denmark	
7	Cattermole Memorial Library	Cattermole Memorial Library	April 5, 1984 (#84001267)	614 7th St. 40°37′53″N 91°18′34″W	Fort Madison	
8	Gen. Samuel R. Curtis House	Gen. Samuel R. Curtis House	April 23, 1998 (#98000384)	206 High St. 40°23′43″N 91°22′42″W	Keokuk	Greek Revival residence of Civil War general Samuel R. Curtis.
9	Denmark Congregational Church		December 2, 1977 (#77000534)	Academy Ave. and 4th St. 40°44′31″N 91°20′00″W	Denmark	Abolitionist Asa Turner, Jr. was pastor of the church in the mid-19th century.
10	Donnellson Depot		November 21, 2025 (#100012351)	400 Mill Street; 40°38′38″N 91°33′47″W	Donnellson	
11	Faeth Farmstead and Orchard District	Faeth Farmstead and Orchard District	September 16, 2005 (#05001020)	2469 Iowa Highway 2; 40°38′11″N 91°26′11″W	Fort Madison	On the Most Endangered list of the Iowa Historic Preservation Alliance
12	Fort Madison Bridge	Fort Madison Bridge	August 27, 1999 (#99001035)	Iowa Highway 9 over the Mississippi River; 40°37′16″N 91°17′15″W	Fort Madison	A swinging truss toll bridge over the Mississippi River that connects Fort Madison with Niota in Hancock County, Illinois
13	Fort Madison High School	Fort Madison High School	January 21, 2015 (#14001169)	1812 Avenue F 40°37′54″N 91°19′50″W	Fort Madison	
14	Fort Madison Downtown Commercial Historic District	Fort Madison Downtown Commercial Historic District	August 31, 2007 (#07000852)	Centered on Avenue G, from near 6th St. to the middle of the 900 block, including Avenue H from 7th to 9th 40°37′51″N 91°18′40″W	Fort Madison	Federal and Late Victorian buildings from the late 19th century.
15	GEO. M. VERITY	GEO. M. VERITY	December 20, 1989 (#89002459)	Keokuk River Museum, Victory Park; 40°23′35″N 91°22′21″W	Keokuk	Towboat built by the Dubuque Boat & Boiler Works in 1927.
16	E. H. Harrison House	E. H. Harrison House	January 12, 1984 (#84001270)	220 N. 4th St. 40°23′49″N 91°22′47″W	Keokuk	A combination Federal and Second Empire style house designed by Frederick H. Moore from 1857.
17	Christian and Katharina Herschler House, Barn, and Outbuildings Historic District		February 16, 1996 (#96000064)	Junction of 6th and Green Sts. 40°39′53″N 91°30′49″W	Franklin	
18	Hotel Iowa	Hotel Iowa	February 5, 1987 (#87000022)	401 Main St. 40°23′43″N 91°22′55″W	Keokuk	An eight-story Chicago Commercial style building from 1913.
19	Iowa State Penitentiary Cellhouses Historic District	Iowa State Penitentiary Cellhouses Historic District	December 18, 1992 (#92001663)	Junction of Avenue G and U.S. Route 61; 40°38′02″N 91°17′45″W	Fort Madison	State penitentiary that was founded in the Territory of Iowa in 1839 and patterned after the penitentiary in Auburn, New York.
20	John N. and Mary L. (Rankin) Irwin House	John N. and Mary L. (Rankin) Irwin House	October 14, 1999 (#99001206)	633 Grand Ave. 40°24′05″N 91°22′34″W	Keokuk	Two-story brick home of John N. Irwin who served as the territorial governor of the Idaho Territory, the Arizona Territory and as the US minister to Portugal.
21	C. R. Joy House	C. R. Joy House	January 16, 1997 (#96001587)	816 Grand Ave. 40°24′16″N 91°22′34″W	Keokuk	Queen Anne stylehouse designed by architect George Franklin Barber.
22	Keokuk Lock and Dam	Keokuk Lock and Dam	October 19, 1978 (#78001234)	At the Mississippi River; 40°23′51″N 91°22′01″W	Keokuk	A 4,620 feet (1,410 m) long dam across the Mississippi River. It includes locks that are 1,200 feet (370 m) long and 110 feet (34 m) wide.
23	Keokuk National Cemetery	Keokuk National Cemetery	June 4, 1997 (#97000528)	1701 J St. 40°23′58″N 91°24′18″W	Keokuk	American Civil War era cemetery that was established to bury the Union soldiers who died in the five army hospitals that were located in Keokuk.
24	Keokuk Union Depot	Keokuk Union Depot	March 27, 2013 (#13000109)	200 Exchange St. 40°23′26″N 91°22′54″W	Keokuk	
25	Keokuk Young Women's Christian Association Building	Keokuk Young Women's Christian Association Building	October 12, 2004 (#04001140)	425 Blondeau St. 40°23′47″N 91°22′54″W	Keokuk	A 1913 building that is representative of transitional architecture in the early 20th century.
26	Lee County Courthouse	Lee County Courthouse	September 30, 1976 (#76000777)	701 Ave. F 40°37′55″N 91°18′36″W	Fort Madison	Greek Revival style building from 1842. It is the courthouse for northern Lee County.
27	Lock and Dam No. 19 Historic District	Lock and Dam No. 19 Historic District	March 10, 2004 (#04000179)	525 N. Water St. 40°23′45″N 91°22′32″W	Keokuk	Historic district that includes 7 buildings, 12 structures, 1 object.
28	Daniel McConn Barn	Daniel McConn Barn	May 26, 2000 (#00000531)	2095 US Business 61; 40°39′10″N 91°16′34″W	Fort Madison	
29	John McGreer Barn and Crib		August 8, 2001 (#01000859)	2056 150th Ave. 40°39′34″N 91°37′22″W	Donnellson	
30	Justice Samuel Freeman Miller House	Justice Samuel Freeman Miller House	October 10, 1972 (#72000477)	318 N. 5th St. 40°23′53″N 91°22′46″W	Keokuk	An Italianate house from 1859 that was home to Samuel Freeman Miller who served for 28 years on the United States Supreme Court.
31	Moyce-Steffens House	Moyce-Steffens House	May 2, 1997 (#97000394)	1615 Avenue H 40°37′49″N 91°19′38″W	Fort Madison	
32	Old Fort Madison Site	Old Fort Madison Site	May 7, 1973 (#73000734)	Address Restricted	Fort Madison	The first permanent U.S. military fortification on the Upper Mississippi River. On the Most Endangered list of the Iowa Historic Preservation Alliance. Boundary increases approved April 18, 2018.
33	Park-to-Park Residential Historic District	Park-to-Park Residential Historic District	December 22, 2014 (#14001069)	400-1100 blocks of Ave. F & 400-1100 blocks of Ave. E 40°37′58″N 91°18′35″W	Fort Madison	
34	Presbyterian Church		April 29, 2022 (#100007678)	316 3rd St. 40°43′04″N 91°27′20″W	West Point	
35	Primrose Mill		March 17, 1983 (#83000383)	Off Iowa Highway 2; 40°40′31″N 91°38′16″W	Primrose	
36	Saint Barnabas Episcopal Church	Saint Barnabas Episcopal Church	April 11, 1986 (#86000721)	Chestnut St. 40°31′54″N 91°25′06″W	Montrose	Gothic Revival style church from 1869.
37	St. John's Episcopal Church and Parish Hall	St. John's Episcopal Church and Parish Hall	July 11, 1989 (#89000806)	4th and Concert; 40°23′48″N 91°22′58″W	Keokuk	Gothic Revival church designed by Daniel Appleton and H.M. Stephenson. It was built from 1884 to 1888.
38	St. Mary of the Assumption Church	St. Mary of the Assumption Church	February 8, 1980 (#80001455)	1031 Ave. E 40°38′00″N 91°19′00″W	Fort Madison	Gothic Revival style church designed by Walch & Schmidt and completed in 1871. It is now a part of Holy Family parish.
39	St. Peter Church	St. Peter Church	July 14, 1983 (#83000384)	301 S. 9th St. 40°23′50″N 91°23′25″W	Keokuk	Gothic Revival church built between 1879 and 1885. It is now known as the Church of All Saints.
40	Hugh W. and Sarah Sample House	Hugh W. and Sarah Sample House	November 22, 1995 (#95001318)	205 N. 2nd St. 40°23′40″N 91°22′45″W	Keokuk	Italianate style house from 1859.
41	George E. Schlapp House	George E. Schlapp House	February 4, 1982 (#82002627)	639 Ave. C 40°38′09″N 91°18′32″W	Fort Madison	
42	Sharon Cemetery Historic District	Sharon Cemetery Historic District	January 11, 1991 (#90002133)	County Road J40 about 3 miles (4.8 km) east of the Van Buren county line 40°43′31″N 91°39′41″W	Farmington	
43	Craig and Virginia Sheaffer House	Craig and Virginia Sheaffer House	April 22, 1993 (#93000329)	10 High Point; 40°38′04″N 91°17′10″W	Fort Madison	
44	Walter A. Sheaffer House	Walter A. Sheaffer House	September 19, 2006 (#06000858)	11 High Point; 40°38′02″N 91°17′14″W	Fort Madison	
45	The Park Place-Grand Avenue Residential District	The Park Place-Grand Avenue Residential District	September 12, 2002 (#02001020)	4th at Park Place and Orleans St. and north up Grand Ave. to Rand Park; 40°24′18″N 91°22′36″W	Keokuk	Residential area of Late Victorian homes that were mostly built in the early 20th century.
46	U.S. Post Office and Courthouse	U.S. Post Office and Courthouse	January 24, 1974 (#74000796)	25 N. 7th St. 40°23′51″N 91°23′02″W	Keokuk	Late Victorian building from 1887. It was originally built as a Federal courthouse, but now serves as the South Lee County Courthouse as well as a post office.
47	Alois and Annie Weber House	Alois and Annie Weber House	April 16, 2002 (#02000375)	802 Orleans Ave. 40°24′09″N 91°22′44″W	Keokuk	Second Empire style home from 1873.
48	Frank J. Weess House	Frank J. Weess House	May 22, 1978 (#78001235)	224-226 Morgan St. 40°23′47″N 91°22′39″W	Keokuk	Second Empire style home that was built from 1880 to 1881.

== See also ==
- List of National Historic Landmarks in Iowa
- National Register of Historic Places listings in Iowa
- Listings in neighboring counties: Clark (MO), Des Moines, Hancock (IL), Henderson (IL), Henry, Van Buren
