= National Register of Historic Places listings in Hancock County, Illinois =

Location of Hancock County in Illinois

This is a list of the National Register of Historic Places listings in Hancock County, Illinois.

This is intended to be a complete list of the properties and districts on the National Register of Historic Places in Hancock County, Illinois, United States. Latitude and longitude coordinates are provided for many National Register properties and districts; these locations may be seen together in a map.

There are 13 properties and districts listed on the National Register in the county.

This National Park Service list is complete through NPS recent listings posted August 14, 2026.

== Current listings ==
	Name on the Register	Image	Date listed	Location	City or town	Description
1	Cambre House and Farm	Cambre House and Farm	November 13, 1984 (#84000308)	Southwest of Niota; 40°35′38″N 91°20′35″W	Niota	
2	Carthage Courthouse Square Historic District	Carthage Courthouse Square Historic District	August 13, 1986 (#86001482)	Roughly bounded by Main, Adams, Wabash, and Madison Sts. 40°24′47″N 91°08′08″W	Carthage	
3	Carthage Jail	Carthage Jail	March 20, 1973 (#73000703)	Walnut and N. Fayette Sts. 40°24′55″N 91°08′22″W	Carthage	
4	Cyrus Felt House	Cyrus Felt House	March 18, 1980 (#80001366)	3 miles north of Hamilton; 40°26′01″N 91°22′11″W	Hamilton	
5	Fort Madison Bridge	Fort Madison Bridge	August 27, 1999 (#99001035)	Iowa Highway 9 over the Mississippi River; 40°37′24″N 91°17′32″W	Niota	A swinging truss toll bridge over the Mississippi River that connects Niota with Fort Madison in Lee County, Iowa
6	Hunziker Winery Site	Hunziker Winery Site	November 18, 2019 (#100004624)	Cedar Glen State Natural Area; 40°21′47″N 91°24′48″W	Warsaw	
7	Keokuk Lock and Dam	Keokuk Lock and Dam	October 19, 1978 (#78001234)	At the Mississippi River; 40°23′51″N 91°22′01″W	Hamilton	A 4,620 feet (1,410 m) long dam across the Mississippi River. It includes locks that are 1,200 feet (370 m) long and 110 feet (34 m) wide. Extends into Lee County, Iowa.
8	La Harpe City Hall	La Harpe City Hall	November 14, 1991 (#91001689)	207 E. Main St. 40°35′00″N 90°58′02″W	La Harpe	
9	La Harpe Historic District	La Harpe Historic District	April 30, 1987 (#87000031)	100-124 W. Main St., 100-122 and 101-129 E. Main Sts., 101-121 S. Center St., and City Pk. 40°35′00″N 90°58′10″W	La Harpe	
10	Lock and Dam No. 19 Historic District	Lock and Dam No. 19 Historic District	March 10, 2004 (#04000179)	West of central Hamilton; 40°23′45″N 91°22′32″W	Hamilton	Historic district that includes 7 buildings, 12 structures, 1 object. Extends into Lee County, Iowa.
11	Nauvoo Historic District	Nauvoo Historic District	October 15, 1966 (#66000321)	Nauvoo and its environs 40°33′05″N 91°22′18″W	Nauvoo	
12	William J. Reimbold House	William J. Reimbold House	December 2, 1987 (#87002033)	950 White St. 40°32′51″N 91°23′15″W	Nauvoo	
13	Warsaw Historic District	Warsaw Historic District	December 16, 1977 (#77000486)	Roughly bounded by the Mississippi River, Marion and 11th Sts. 40°21′48″N 91°26′07″W	Warsaw	

== See also ==
- List of National Historic Landmarks in Illinois
- National Register of Historic Places listings in Illinois
