= Overseer of the poor =

English official who administered poor relief

An overseer of the poor was an official who administered poor relief such as money, food, and clothing in England and various other countries which derived their law from England, such as the United States.

== England ==
In England, overseers of the poor administered poor relief such as money, food and clothing as part of the Poor Law system. The position was created by the Poor Relief Act 1597 (39 Eliz. 1. c. 3) .

Overseers of the poor were often reluctant appointees who were unpaid, working under the supervision of a justice of the peace. The law required two overseers to be elected every Easter, and churchwardens or landowners were often selected.

The new system of poor relief reinforced a sense of social hierarchy and provided a way of controlling the 'lower orders'.

Outdoor and Indoor Relief

Overseers of the poor, in the early nineteenth century could grant 'outdoor relief' to individuals born in their parish. That was a small weekly sum that allowed those who had their own homes to stay there and do some work, which lessened the burden on the community. Outdoor relief was available only for the able-bodied. Orphan children, the infirm and old were given 'indoor relief', or as it was better known, the workhouse.

Overseers of the poor were mostly abolished by the Poor Law Amendment Act 1834 (4 & 5 Will. 4. c. 76), and replaced with boards of guardians, although overseers remained in some places as a method of collecting the poor rate.

Overseers Order 1927
- Statutory Rules and Orders
- Parliament of the United Kingdom
- Citation: SR&O 1927/55

Dates
- Made: 7 February 1927
- Commencement: 1 April 1927
Other legislation
Made under	Rating and Evaluation Act 1925

Text of statute as originally enacted

Under the Rating and Evaluation Act 1925 (15 & 16 Geo. 5. c. 90) on 1 April 1927 their rating powers were transferred to borough and district councils, and under the Overseers Order 1927 (SR&O 1927/55) the remaining overseers were abolished on 1 April 1927, with their residual powers over appointment of parish constables and as trustees of parish charities passing to parish councils.

=== Duties ===
Overseers had four duties:

- Estimate how much poor relief money was needed in order to set the poor rate accordingly;
- Collect the poor rate;
- Distribute poor relief; and
- Supervise the poorhouse.

== Vermont ==
In the U.S. state of Vermont, the former post of overseer of the poor was an elected town office responsible for welfare benefits. A 1797 law requires town overseers to "relieve, support and maintain" the "poor, lame, blind, sick and other inhabitants within such town or place, who are not able to maintain themselves." Some records survive of relief recipients, along with amounts provided. Several towns maintained town farms (known as "poor farms") in which the poor lived and worked for their support (akin to the workhouses of England). Some disabled Vermonters were sent to the Brandon State School instead.

Effective October 1, 1968, Vermont abolished the post of overseer of the poor, and the state took over welfare.

== See also ==
- Poormaster
- Overseer (slave plantation)
