= Schlapp =

Schlapp is a surname. Notable people with the surname include:

- Alyce Louise Schlapp (1912–1999), American politician
- George E. Schlapp (1839–1912), American brewer
- Lothar Schlapp (born 1960), German footballer
- Matt Schlapp (born 1967), American political activist and lobbyist
- Mercedes Schlapp (born 1972), American communications specialist and political commentator
- Robert Schlapp (1899–1991), British physicist and mathematician of German descent
