= John McGreer Barn and Crib =

- U.S. National Register of Historic Places
- Location within Iowa Location within the United States
- Location: 2056 150th Ave. Donnellson, Iowa
- Coordinates: 40°39′34.39″N 91°37′21.58″W
- Area: less than one acre
- Built: 1884
- Architectural style: Pennsylvania barn
- NRHP reference No.: 01000859
- Added to NRHP: August 8, 2001

John McGreer Barn and Crib are a historic building (barn) and structure (corn crib) located in rural Harrison Township, Lee County, Iowa, United States. They are located on a farm northwest of the town of Donnellson. The agricultural buildings were listed on the National Register of Historic Places in 2001.

The barn was built in 1884 in the Pennsylvania barn style. It measures 76 by 48 feet (23 by 15 m), and features a cupola on top. While the basement level, composed of rubble limestone walls, is banked into a slight slope, it is largely exposed all-around. The upper portions of the barn are covered with vertical board-and-batten siding. A pole shed has been added off of the back of the building. The corn crib is located west of the barn. The 32-by-26-foot (9.8 by 7.9 m) structure was built around the same time as the barn. It is also banked into the same slope. Like the barn, it has a rubble limestone basement, board-and-batten siding on the upper level, and a round arch window in its front gable end. The barn and corn crib were two of 13 extant buildings at the time of their nomination on the former John and Julia McGreer farmstead. The farm itself had been established in 1837 by John's parents Alexander and Jane McGreer. The extant farm buildings are largely from John McGreer's ownership. They are historically significant for their association with his "large and prosperous livestock operation."
