= William M. Bunn =

American politician and newspaperman (1842-1923)

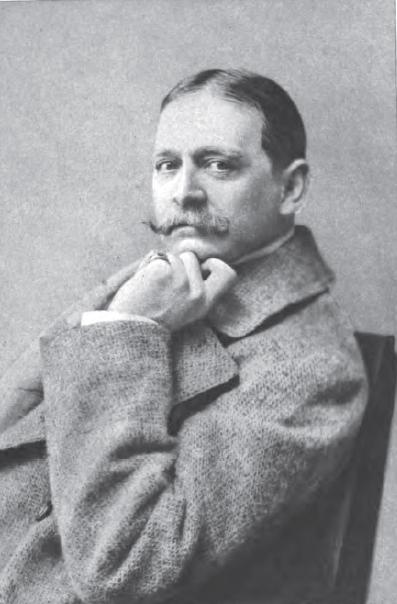

10th Governor of Idaho Territory
- In office March 26, 1884 – July 9, 1885
- Nominated by: Chester A. Arthur
- Preceded by: John N. Irwin
- Succeeded by: Edward A. Stevenson

Pennsylvania House of Representatives
- In office 1869–1870

Personal details
- Born: January 1, 1842 Philadelphia, Pennsylvania, U.S.
- Died: September 19, 1923 (aged 81) Philadelphia, Pennsylvania, U.S.
- Resting place: West Laurel Hill Cemetery, Bala Cynwyd, Pennsylvania, U.S.
- Party: Republican
- Spouse: Cathanne Myers
- Profession: Wood carver, Newspaperman

William Malcolm Bunn (January 1, 1842 – September 19, 1923) was an American politician and newspaper publisher. He held local political offices in Philadelphia and served as a Republican member of the Pennsylvania House of Representatives from 1869 to 1870. He was a member of the Cameron machine. He purchased the Philadelphia Sunday Transcript newspaper and traded positive news coverage for political favors. He was appointed Governor of the Idaho Territory by President Chester A. Arthur as a reward for political support from the Cameron machine and served from 1884 to 1885. As Governor, he was caught between competing factions within his party fighting over polygamy and concerns with the territory's Mormon population.

== Early life ==
Bunn was born in Philadelphia, Pennsylvania, on January 1, 1842, to Rebecca Henry and Albert Gesner Bunn. He was raised in the city's 16th ward and educated in public schools. At the age of eleven, he worked in a factory for three years before being sent to Havana, New York, to attend a school run by his uncle. At 16, he completed his formal education and apprenticed as a wood carver.

During the American Civil War, Bunn enlisted in the 72nd Pennsylvania Infantry. He was promoted to corporal and on June 29, 1862, during the Battle of Savage's Station, he was wounded and captured by Confederate forces. Bunn was held as a prisoner of war in Richmond, Virginia, until his release during a prisoner exchange later that year. Upon his return to Philadelphia, Bunn experienced a relapse of problems from his wound and received a medical discharge.

Following his military service, Bunn joined with his brother in a successful wood carving business. He served as a colonel in the Pennsylvania National Guard. In 1870 he married Cathanne Myers. The couple had one son.

== Early political career ==
Bunn became politically active in 1866 when he served as a delegate to Philadelphia's citywide Republican Convention. The next year he ran for a seat on the city council, but withdrew his candidacy before the election to resolve a dispute within his party. In 1868 he was elected to the first of two consecutive terms in the Pennsylvania General Assembly. After his time in the state assembly, Bunn was elected Register of Wills. This was followed by his election as Guardian of the Poor in 1875 and 1878. While holding these various offices, Bunn also served as a party delegate at the local, state, and national level.

In 1878, Bunn purchased the Philadelphia Sunday Transcript. As owner of the newspaper, he became a supporter of the Cameron political machine and traded positive coverage for political favors.

In addition to his political and business activities, Bunn developed an active social life. He became well known as a dinner speaker and his flamboyant dress earned him a reputation as one of Philadelphia's best dressed men. As a measure of his social success, Bunn became Vice-President of the Clover Club.

== Governorship ==
By the 1880s, Bunn had developed mining interests in both Arizona and Idaho territories. Wishing for a political position close to his business interests, Bunn used his political connections to lobby for appointment as Governor of Arizona Territory following the resignation of John C. Frémont. Unsuccessful in this effort, Bunn continued looking for another appointment close to his business interests.

Bunn's appointment came as a consequence of the 1884 presidential election. President Chester Arthur agreed to appoint the newspaperman in exchange for support from the Cameron political machine. The machine in turn agreed to support Arthur's reelection as long as he maintained a lead over James G. Blaine. Bunn was commissioned as Governor of Idaho Territory on March 26, 1884.

The new governor arrived in Idaho Territory on June 26, 1884. Bunn quickly gained a reputation for "setting a pace that no governor before had had the experience or wealth to maintain" with his social and sartorial style resulted in him being called the "dude governor". Highlights of his tenure as governor include authorization of US$80,000 worth of bonds for building a permanent capital in Boise, support for laws limiting logging in the territory's forests, a push to establish the position of territorial attorney general, and a call to build an insane asylum at Blackfoot and eliminate the need to send the mentally ill to facilities in Oregon.

However, the biggest political issue upon Bunn's arrival was the anti-Mormon movement. The new governor, more interested in his business interests, took a moderate perspective of opposing polygamy but being otherwise tolerant of the Mormon population. This placed him at odds with both the radical Republicans who advocated total disenfranchisement of the Mormons and the moderate Democrats with their Mormon allies. Specific actions taken by Bunn on this issue include supporting legislation that created Bingham County, diluting Mormon influence in Oneida County as a consequence, and signing a bill requiring territorial officials to take an anti-Mormon loyalty oath.

Actions by Bunn, combined with anti-Mormon rhetoric, were not enough to satisfy the radical elements of his own party. A dispute arose between him and the leader of the radical Republican faction, US Marshal Fred Dubois, when the governor refused to appoint a candidate supported by Dubois to a newly created position in Bingham County. This led to a confrontation between the governor and the marshal, leading Bunn to walk away from a face-to-face meeting with Dubois. Bunn claimed that Dubois was about to pull a gun on the unarmed governor, and Dubois in turn labeled Bunn a coward. Despite this incident, the governor preferred to allow "Boise Ring" leader David P. B. Pride to contend with Dubois for control of the Republican party within the territory.

Tensions between the moderate and radical factions continued to build until February 14, 1885. In the early morning hours, after that day's newspaper had already been printed with a series of stories and editorials critical of Bunn, the offices of the Boise City Republican suffered a break-in that scattered the paper's type. At about the same time, the offices of the Idaho Democrat were set on fire. Neither incident caused serious damage, but did result in a popular uproar. Dubois supporters used the incident as an excuse to have local newspapers reprint year-old Philadelphia editorials critical of Bunn. The entire incident would later become known as the "Bunn War."

At the time of the break-ins, Bunn was on an extended leave of absence. He returned to Idaho after five months and submitted his resignation: dated July 3, 1885, it was effective six days later.

== Later life ==
After his resignation, Bunn returned to his home town. In 1908 he published Some After Dinner Speeches containing a collection of his oratories. He served as prothonotary of the Philadelphia Common Pleas Court from 1922 to 1923. Bunn died in Philadelphia on September 19, 1923, and was interred at West Laurel Hill Cemetery in Bala Cynwyd, Pennsylvania.
