= John N. Irwin =

American governor and politician (1844–1905)

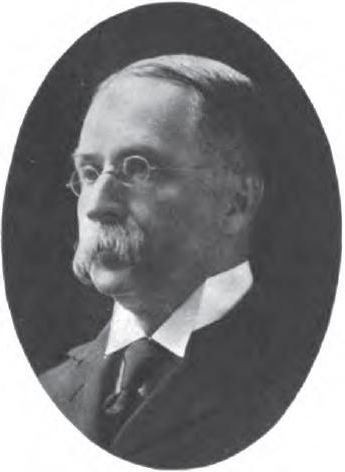

9th Governor of Idaho Territory
- In office March 5, 1883 – December 20, 1883
- Nominated by: Chester A. Arthur
- Preceded by: John Baldwin Neil
- Succeeded by: William M. Bunn

9th Governor of Arizona Territory
- In office October 4, 1890 – April 18, 1892
- Nominated by: Benjamin Harrison
- Preceded by: Lewis Wolfley
- Succeeded by: Nathan Oakes Murphy

Personal details
- Born: December 25, 1844 Butler County, Ohio
- Died: December 22, 1905 (aged 60) Hot Springs, Arkansas
- Party: Republican
- Spouse: Mary Love Rankin
- Education: University of Michigan

John Nichol Irwin (December 25, 1845 (Note: The year of Irwin's birth is uncertain. In addition to 1844, both 1843 and 1845 are possible alternatives.) – December 22, 1905) was an American businessman, politician and diplomat. Among the positions he held were Mayor of Keokuk, Iowa, Governor of Idaho Territory, Governor of Arizona Territory, and U.S. Minister to Portugal.

== Background ==
Irwin was born December 25, 1845, in Butler County, Ohio, to Stephen and Elizabeth Martha (Nichol) Irwin. His family moved to Keokuk, Iowa, in 1856 and he was educated in public schools in both Ohio and Iowa before attending Miami University in his birth state. His education was interrupted by the American Civil War, when Irwin served with the 45th Iowa Volunteer Infantry Regiment, and reached the rank of sergeant. Following the war he returned to his studies and graduated from Dartmouth College in 1867. He was a member of Delta Kappa Epsilon fraternity.

After graduation, Irwin returned to Keokuk and studied law at the firm of Miller and Rankin. He additionally studied for a time at the University of Michigan Law School. On June 6, 1871, he married his mentor's daughter, Mary Love Rankin. The couple had three children, Alice, Elizabeth, and John R.

Despite his legal training, Irwin spent most of his efforts working at the family dry goods business. Performing occasional legal work, he also became a founder and director of the Keokuk Building and Loan Company. He served five terms as mayor of Keokuk and two terms in the Iowa House of Representatives.

== Idaho Territory ==
Following the removal of John Baldwin Neil, Irwin was nominated as Governor of Idaho Territory by President Chester A. Arthur and commissioned on March 5, 1883. Arriving in the territory in April, he took a brief tour with Theodore F. Singiser before returning to Keokuk to handle personal business and prepare his family to move to the territory. At the end of a 60-day leave, he requested and received a 60-day extension. In August, news reached Idaho that Irwin had developed problems with his eyes. By October, the new governor was expressing his desire to soon return to his duties while at the same time expecting to undergo surgery to correct the problem with his eyes. Citing "personal reasons", Irwin submitted his resignation on December 20, 1883. During his tenure of over nine months as governor, he had spent less than one month in the territory.

An unusual aspect of his tenure was Irwin returning most of his salary, claiming he could not in good conscience accept the unearned pay. This action received widespread newspaper results due to its rarity – most political appointees of the day took all monies they could collect without question. It also created a problem for the Treasury Department which was unsure how to handle the situation. They initially attempted to place the returned money in the Conscience Fund, but this resulted in a protest from Irwin who did not wish the returned salary to be associated with monies returned by guilt-ridden criminals. The returned funds were eventually credited to the public debt.

== Arizona Territory ==
Following the resignation of Lewis Wolfley as Governor of the Arizona Territory, President Benjamin Harrison took over a month to choose a replacement. Upon the recommendation of U.S. Senator William B. Allison, Irwin was nominated for the governorship on September 29, 1890, and confirmed on October 4, 1890. The new governor was however delayed in assuming his new position, being quarantined in his home after his son was diagnosed with scarlet fever till January of the next year.

Irwin was sworn into office on January 21, 1891. By this time the 16th Arizona Territorial Legislature was already in session. Secretary Oakes Murphy, as Acting Governor, had already given the session's opening address, so Irwin made his wishes felt through use of his veto. To help control the territorial deficit the governor vetoed an "outrageous" appropriation bill, forcing the legislature to pass a less ambitious spending plan. Irwin was however convinced to sign a twenty-year tax exemption on newly constructed railroad lines.

Among the other actions of the 16th legislature was an act calling for a constitutional convention. In response to this act, Irwin called a special election to choose delegates. A constitution was written by the convention and approved by Arizona voters in 1891, but the document never received serious consideration by interests in the U.S. Congress due to its provisions supporting Free Silver, state control of rivers and canals, and state aid to railroads and other businesses.

On June 15, 1891, Irwin left for the East Coast. At the time of his departure the territory's bonds were selling for below par and the governor wished to negotiate with New York financial interests about the territorial debt. He also used the visit to extol Arizona's virtues during a July 28, 1891, dinner. Following his stay in New York he returned to Keokuk to continue his work of refinancing the territorial debt.

While in Keokuk, Irwin found his mother had taken ill. This prompted him to extend his stay and he did not return to Arizona until November 9, 1891. Irwin's mother became ill again in April 1892, prompting the governor to return to Iowa. Following his mother's death, Irwin submitted his resignation on April 18, 1892, to deal with resulting family business concerns.

== Later life ==
After leaving Arizona, Irwin made his home in Keokuk. He remained there till 1899 when he was appointed Minister to Portugal. Irwin resigned his diplomatic appointment in June 1901.

Irwin's death occurred on December 22, 1905, in Hot Springs, Arkansas. He was buried in Keokuk's Oakland Cemetery.

== See also ==
- John N. and Mary L. (Rankin) Irwin House, listed on the National Register of Historic Places in Iowa

== Notes ==
Political offices
Preceded by John Baldwin Neil	Territorial Governor of Idaho; 1883–1883	Succeeded by William M. Bunn
Preceded by Lewis Wolfley	Territorial Governor of Arizona; 1890–1892	Succeeded by Nathan Oakes Murphy
