= Warsaw Historic District =

Warsaw Historic District may refer to:

- Warsaw Historic District (Warsaw, Illinois), listed on the NRHP in Illinois
- Warsaw Courthouse Square Historic District, Warsaw, IN, listed on the NRHP in Indiana
- Warsaw Historic District (Warsaw, Kentucky), listed on the NRHP in Kentucky
- Warsaw Historic District (Warsaw, North Carolina), listed on the NRHP in North Carolina
