= Lee County Courthouse (Keokuk, Iowa) =

- U.S. Post Office and Courthouse
- U.S. National Register of Historic Places
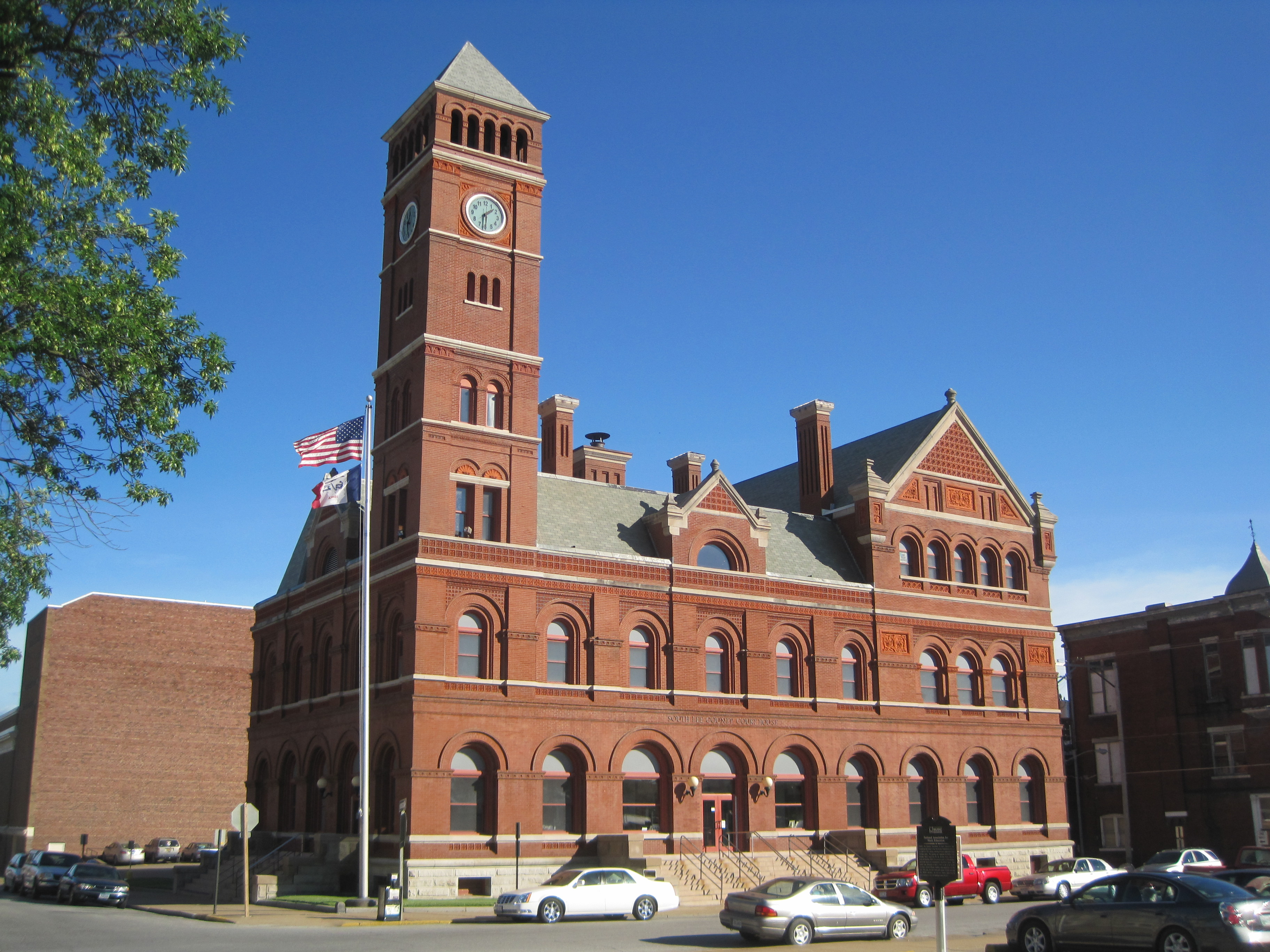

- Location within Iowa Location within the United States
- Location: 25 N. 7th St. Keokuk, Iowa
- Coordinates: 40°23′51″N 91°23′2″W
- Area: 0.7 acres (0.28 ha)
- Built: 1887
- Architect: Mifflin E. Bell
- Architectural style: Late Victorian, round-arch Victorian
- NRHP reference No.: 74000796
- Added to NRHP: January 24, 1974

The Lee County Courthouse, also known as the South Lee County Courthouse and the U.S. Post Office and Courthouse, is a historic building located in Keokuk, Iowa, United States.

== History ==
The main building was built from the laying the foundation in April 1887 to its completion on September 30, 1888. The building was designed by Mifflin E. Bell, the Supervising Architect of the US Treasury Department. The corner tower was originally built at five stories, but was extended to seven stories in 1890. James H. Windrim was the Treasury Department's Supervising Architect at that time. In 1956 an addition was built onto the rear of the building to add space to the workroom. The building served historically as a Federal courthouse on the upper floors and as a post office on the first floor. It was listed on the National Register of Historic Places in 1974.

The building was acquired by Lee County and renovated in 1992 as a courthouse for the southern part of the county. The Iowa General Assembly had established Keokuk as the second county seat in 1848, making Lee County as the only Iowa county that has more than one courthouse. The Sullivan Line was used to divide the county into northern and southern sections. Previous buildings that served as the county courthouse in Keokuk include the Sanford Medical College and the old YWCA Building.

== Architecture ==
The three-story brick structure from the 1880s measures 108 by 62 feet (33 by 19 m). It reflects Late Victorian and "round-arch Victorian" architecture. The basement and foundation are composed of Bedford limestone. Limestone is also used for the building's trim and belt courses. The windows on all three floors utilize the round-arch, and they decrease in size from the first to the third floor. A large wall dormer is located in the center of the main facade. Two roof dormers originally flanked it, but they were removed at some point. Wall dormers are also located on the west and south elevations. The gable section on west side of the third floor features terracotta decorative work and corner finials. Similar terracotta panels are located elsewhere on the building. The back of the building features the same decorative work as the front. The first level of the tower on the third floor of the building is original. The next two levels were designed for the 1890 extension, and the top two section are from the original design and reflect the two sections that were removed. The rear addition is also red brick and follows a simple utilitarian style.

== See also ==
- National Register of Historic Places listings in Lee County, Iowa
- List of United States post offices
- List of county courthouses in Iowa
