= George M. Verity (towboat) =

American historic towboat

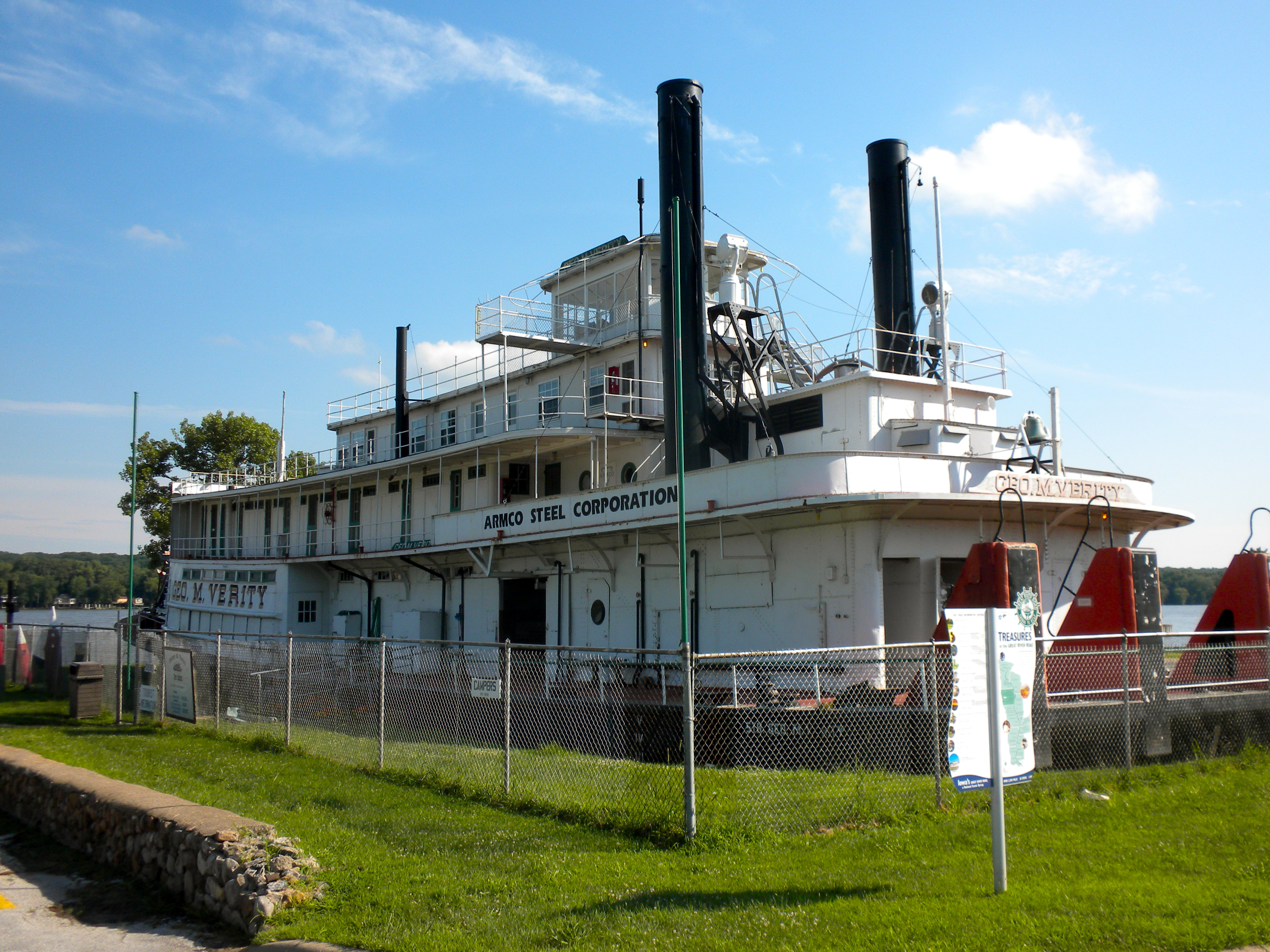

History

United States
- Name: Thorpe (1927–1940); George M. Verity (1940–)
- Builder: Dubuque Boat and Boiler Works
- Launched: 1927
- Out of service: 1960
- Status: Museum ship

General characteristics
- Length: 162.5 ft (49.5 m)
- Beam: 35.1 ft (10.7 m) (as built); 40.6 ft (12.4 m) (after modification)
- Depth: 5.1 ft (1.6 m)
- Installed power: 2 × Nordberg Machine Works tandem-compound condensing steam engines
- Propulsion: 16 bucket radial paddlewheel (as built); experimental double helical paddlewheel (1945–)
- George M. Verity (Towboat)
- U.S. National Register of Historic Places
- U.S. National Historic Landmark
- Location within Iowa
- Location: Keokuk, Iowa
- Coordinates: 40°23′25.4″N 91°22′47.5″W
- Built: 1927
- Architect: Dubuque Boat & Boiler Works
- NRHP reference No.: 89002459

Significant dates
- Added to NRHP: 20 December 1989
- Designated NHL: 29 December 1989

George M. Verity is a historic towboat now displayed as a museum ship in Keokuk, Iowa. Built in 1927 as SS Thorpe, she is nationally significant for being one of only three surviving steam-powered towboats in existence in the United States. She was declared a National Historic Landmark in 1989.

== Description and history ==
George M. Verity is a steel-hulled steam-powered stern-wheeler towboat, measuring 130.1 feet (39.7 m) in length, 162.5 feet (49.5 m) with the wheel included. Originally built with a beam of 35.1 feet (10.7 m), she was eventually widened to 40.6 feet (12.4 m). She has a scow-form bow and a keelless flat bottom. Her internal structure involves a then-experimental truss system to support the weight of heavy components, including the boilers and engines.

George M. Verity was built in 1927 at Dubuque, Iowa for the Inland Waterways Corporation, an arm of the United States Government, as SS Thorpe, as one of four towboats that inaugurated barge service on the upper Mississippi River. She was the first to move barges from St. Louis north to St. Paul. She remained in service there until 1940, when she was sold to Armco Steel Corp. and put in service on the Ohio River. Armco renamed her after their founder, George Matthew Verity.

In 1960, George M. Verity was retired after 33 years of service on the Mississippi and Ohio Rivers, and in 1961, the boat was given to the City of Keokuk for use as a river museum. The museum opened in 1962, with the boat installed in a permanent drydock facility. Now berthed in Victory Park, she houses the George M. Verity River Museum of Upper Mississippi River history, and is open daily 9:00 AM – 5:00 PM, April to November.

== See also ==
- List of National Historic Landmarks in Iowa
- National Register of Historic Places listings in Lee County, Iowa
