= Daniel McConn Barn =

- U.S. National Register of Historic Places
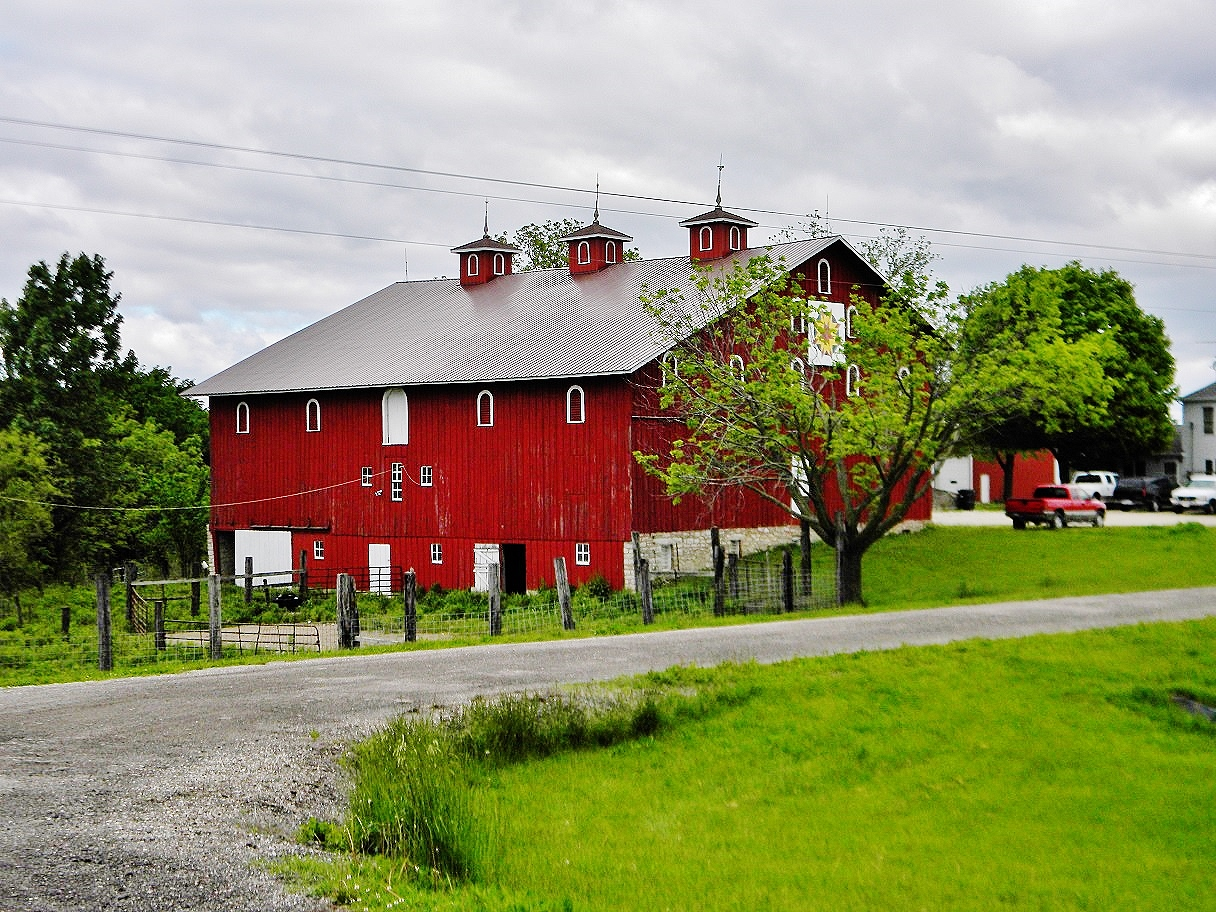

- Location within Iowa Location within the United States
- Location: 2095 Highway 61; Fort Madison, Iowa
- Coordinates: 40°39′10″N 91°16′34″W
- Area: less than one acre
- Built: c.1857
- Architectural style: Pennsylvania barn
- NRHP reference No.: 00000531
- Added to NRHP: May 26, 2000

The Daniel McConn Barn is a historic agricultural building located in near Fort Madison, Iowa, United States. It was listed on the National Register of Historic Places in 2000. It is a bank barn that is built into a south-facing slope. The south exposure of the basement level of the structure allowed protection of livestock in cold weather. The Pennsylvania-type barn was built around 1857 on a farm owned by Daniel McConn, a native of County Down, Ireland. He made his way to Fort Madison in 1837 where he became a merchant. While he owned the farm, it was worked by a tenant farmer. The foundation of the structure is of rubble construction and the sides of the upper structure are of vertical board-and-batten siding. It is capped with a low-pitched, gable roof that features three pyramid-shaped hip roofed ventilation cupolas located along the ridge.
