= Old Fort Madison High School =

- Fort Madison High School
- U.S. National Register of Historic Places
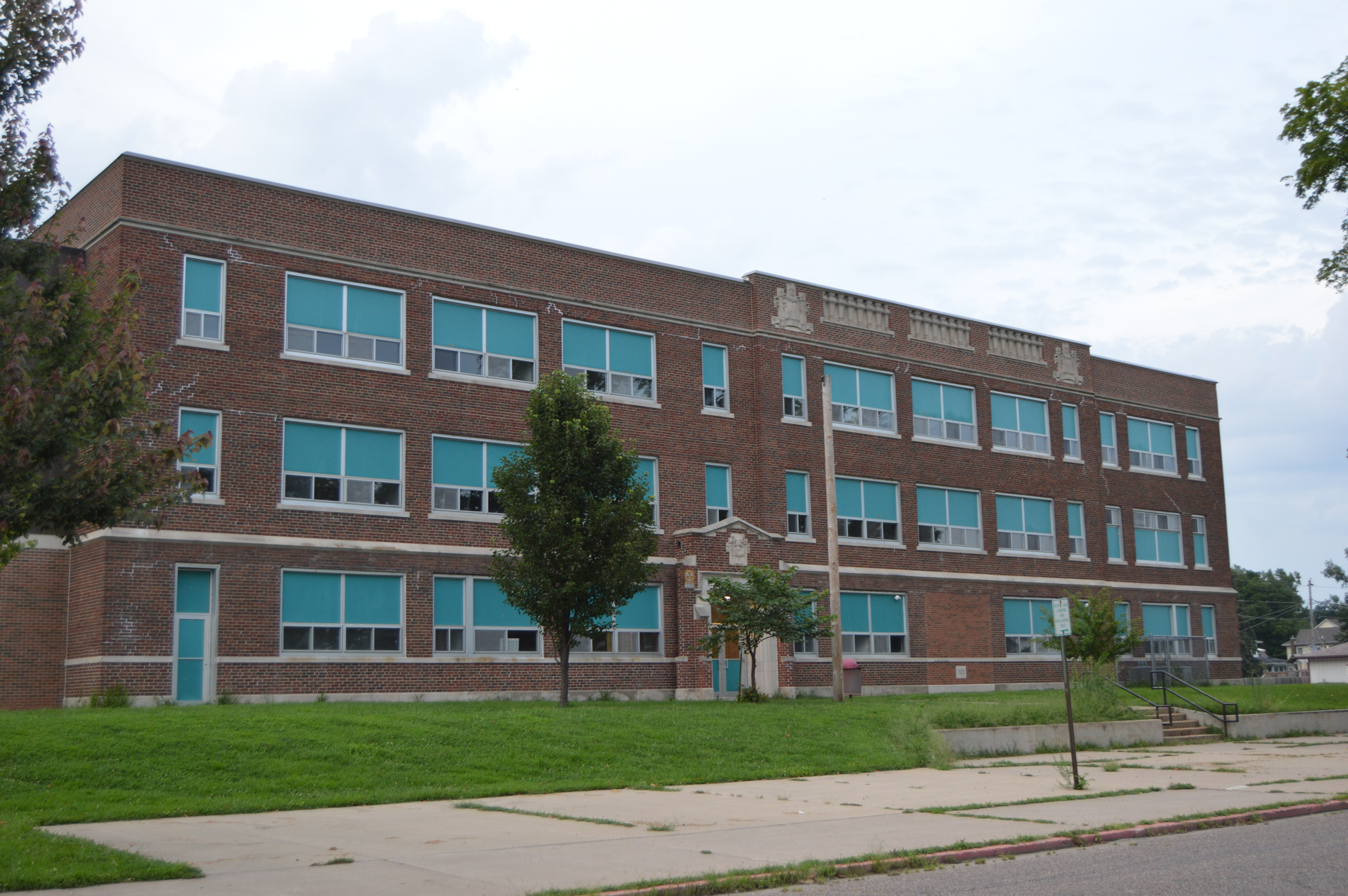
- North elevation

- Location within Iowa Location within the United States
- Location: 1812 Avenue F Fort Madison, Iowa
- Coordinates: 40°37′54″N 91°19′50″W
- Area: 3 acres (1.2 ha)
- Built: 1923
- Built by: Karl Keefer Associates
- Architect: Owen, Payson and Carswell
- Architectural style: Late Gothic Revival
- NRHP reference No.: 14001169
- Added to NRHP: January 21, 2015

The Old Fort Madison High School, also known as the Fort Madison Junior High School and Fort Madison Middle School, is a historic building located in Fort Madison, Iowa, United States. Between 1910 and 1920, the population of Fort Madison increased 35%. There was also a belief that students from the surrounding rural area would increasingly attend the city's high school. By early 1922, there was a desire to replace the 1890 Romanesque Revival high school building. A bond referendum passed in the early summer of that year, and the school district engaged the Kansas City, Missouri architectural firm of Owen, Payson and Carswell to design a new building. The building was mostly completed in mid-September 1923, with the auditorium/gymnasium located in the middle of the structure, completed in December. The three-story brick structure features a prominent front entrance at the center of the main facade, and at the roofline, there are crenulations, crockets, quatrefoil panels, and elaborate heraldic panels. Additions were built on the back of the building in 1946 and in 1959. It housed the high school program from 1923 to 1958, when the present high school building was completed. From 1958 to 2012 the building housed the junior high/middle school program. It was listed on the National Register of Historic Places in 2015. In 2016, the building was converted into an apartment building with 38 units.
