= Alois and Annie Weber House =

Historic house in Iowa, United States

- U.S. National Register of Historic Places
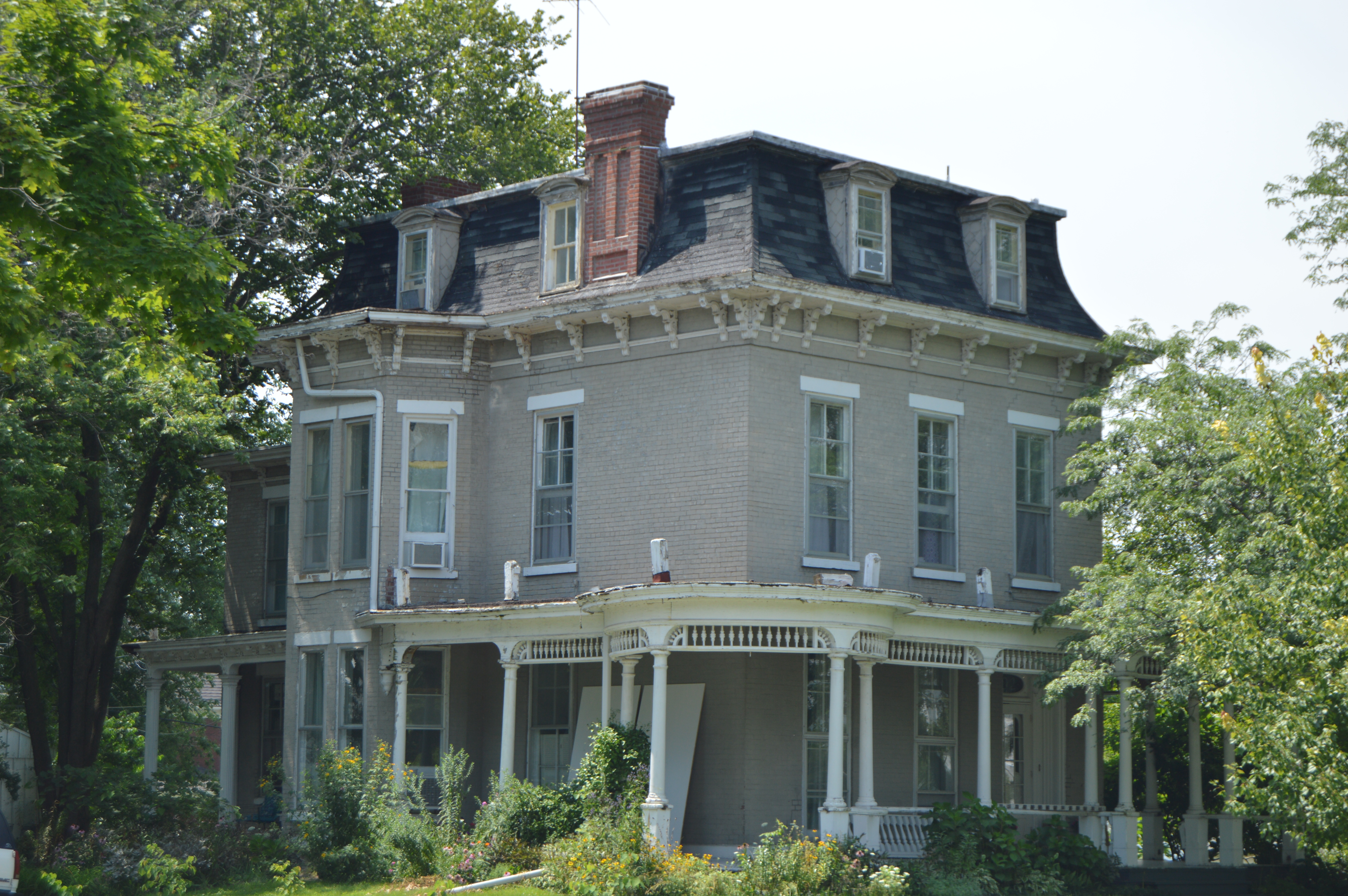
- Front and southeastern side

- Location within Iowa Location within the United States
- Location: 802 Orleans Ave. Keokuk, Iowa
- Coordinates: 40°24′9″N 91°22′44″W
- Area: less than one acre
- Built: c. 1873
- Architectural style: Second Empire
- NRHP reference No.: 02000375
- Added to NRHP: April 16, 2002

The Alois and Annie Weber House is a historic building located in Keokuk, Iowa, United States. The significance of the three-story house is its association with the period of industrial growth in the city when it was built and as a fine local example of the Second Empire style. It features an asymmetrical concave mansard roof, decorative brackets, and pedimented dormer windows. The house is noteworthy for its tall narrow windows and high ceilings. Two additions were added to the rear of the house not long after the main house was built. The Queen Anne-style wraparound porch is supported by 14 classical columns. It also features a balustrade and spindlework along the beadboard ceiling. The house was listed on the National Register of Historic Places in 2002.

Alois Weber founded A. Weber & Co., a hardware business and was known throughout the Midwest. He ran the business until his death in 1917. His wife Annie owned a millinery shop from 1856 to 1887. She died in 1898.
