= Christian and Katharina Herschler House, Barn, and Outbuildings Historic District =

Historic district in Iowa, United States

- U.S. National Register of Historic Places
- U.S. Historic district
- Location within Iowa Location within the United States
- Location: Junction of 6th and Green Sts., Franklin, Iowa
- Coordinates: 40°39′53.92″N 91°30′51.06″W
- Area: 5 acres (2.0 ha)
- Built: 1865, 1871
- NRHP reference No.: 96000064
- Added to NRHP: February 16, 1996

Christian and Katharina Herschler House, Barn, and Outbuildings Historic District are historic buildings located in Franklin, Iowa, United States. The historic district, now known as the Christian Herschler Winery, is located on the edge of town. It was listed on the National Register of Historic Places in 1996. At the time of its nomination it included three contributing buildings: the house (1865), barn (1865) and a shed/summer kitchen. It also includes two noncontributing buildings: a two-room brick structure and a cement foundation. The Herschlers raised their own grapes and operated the town's only winery.

The house is a two-story limestone structure. The 44 by 39 feet (13 by 12 m) structure was built over a walk-in basement. The Herschler's extended the house to the west in 1871, and the dormers and porch were added to the south side of the house at that time. The L-shaped barn was also built in 1865. The main part of the barn measures 40 by 31 feet (12.2 by 9.4 m). It too was enlarged to the west in 1871. The project enclosed the well and connected the outhouse and the lean-to to the barn. The wooden shed to the south of the house is thought to be the summer kitchen.

The Herschlers overextended themselves. A year after they expanded their buildings they were forced to sell their property and its contents at a Sheriff's sale. They moved to California in 1874.
