= Cattermole Memorial Library =

- U.S. National Register of Historic Places
- U.S. Historic district – Contributing property
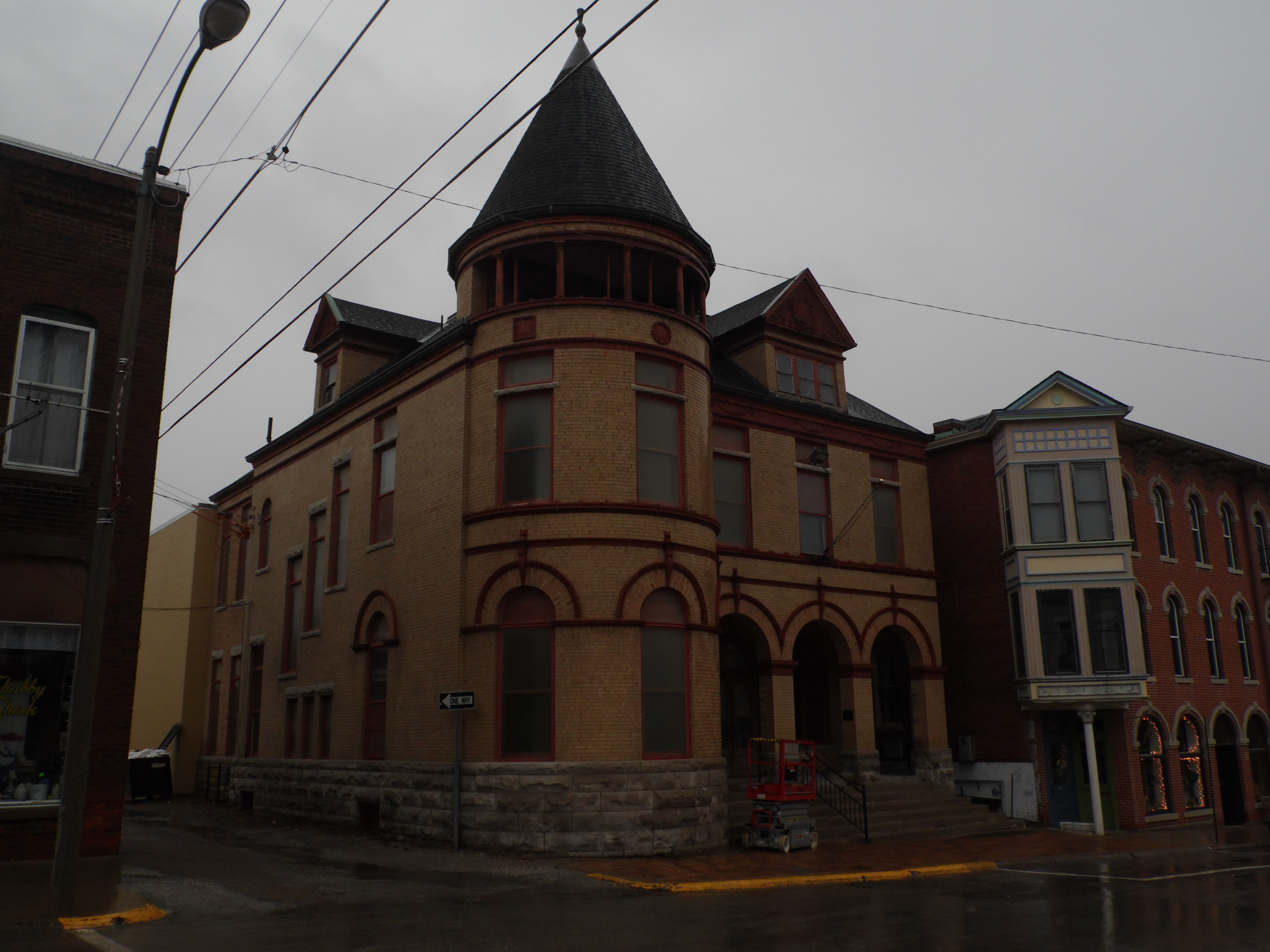

- Location within Iowa Location within the United States
- Location: 614 7th St. Fort Madison, Iowa
- Coordinates: 40°37′53″N 91°18′34″W
- Built: 1893-1894
- Built by: J.C. Sunderland
- Architectural style: Richardsonian Romanesque
- Part of: Fort Madison Downtown Commercial Historic District (ID07000852)
- MPS: Public Library Buildings in Iowa TR
- NRHP reference No.: 84001267
- Added to NRHP: April 5, 1984

Cattermole Memorial Library is a historic building located in Fort Madison, Iowa, United States. It was individually listed on the National Register of Historic Places in 1984. In 2007 it was included as a contributing property in the Fort Madison Downtown Commercial Historic District.

== History ==
The first library in Fort Madison was a reading room established in the late 1870s by the White Ribbon Society, a local temperance group. It grew to such an extent that by 1884 the City Circulation Library was founded. This collection formed the nucleus of what would become the Cattermole Memorial Library in the next decade. Elizabeth Cattermole funded the construction of the building as a memorial for her husband Henry. He had made his fortune in pork packing and banking. Henry had stipulated in his will that $10,000 be used to build a training school. It was an insufficient amount of money to build the school so the money was set aside. Elizabeth recognized the need for a public library in Fort Madison and contributed $30,000 towards the effort to build a new building. She also contributed $500 towards the purchase of new books. This is the earliest extant example of local philanthropic support in Iowa for the construction of a building dedicated for use as a public library. Elizabeth died before the project was completed.

== Architecture ==
Architecturally, the building is a combination of the Loire chateau and Richardsonian Romanesque styles. The exterior of the 2½-story structure is composed of brick with terracotta and stone trim. It is capped with a hipped roof. Roof dormers are located on the north and west elevations. The dominant feature of the building is a corner tower with a conical roof. An addition was added to the rear of the building in 1954.
