= Hunziker Winery Site =

- U.S. National Register of Historic Places
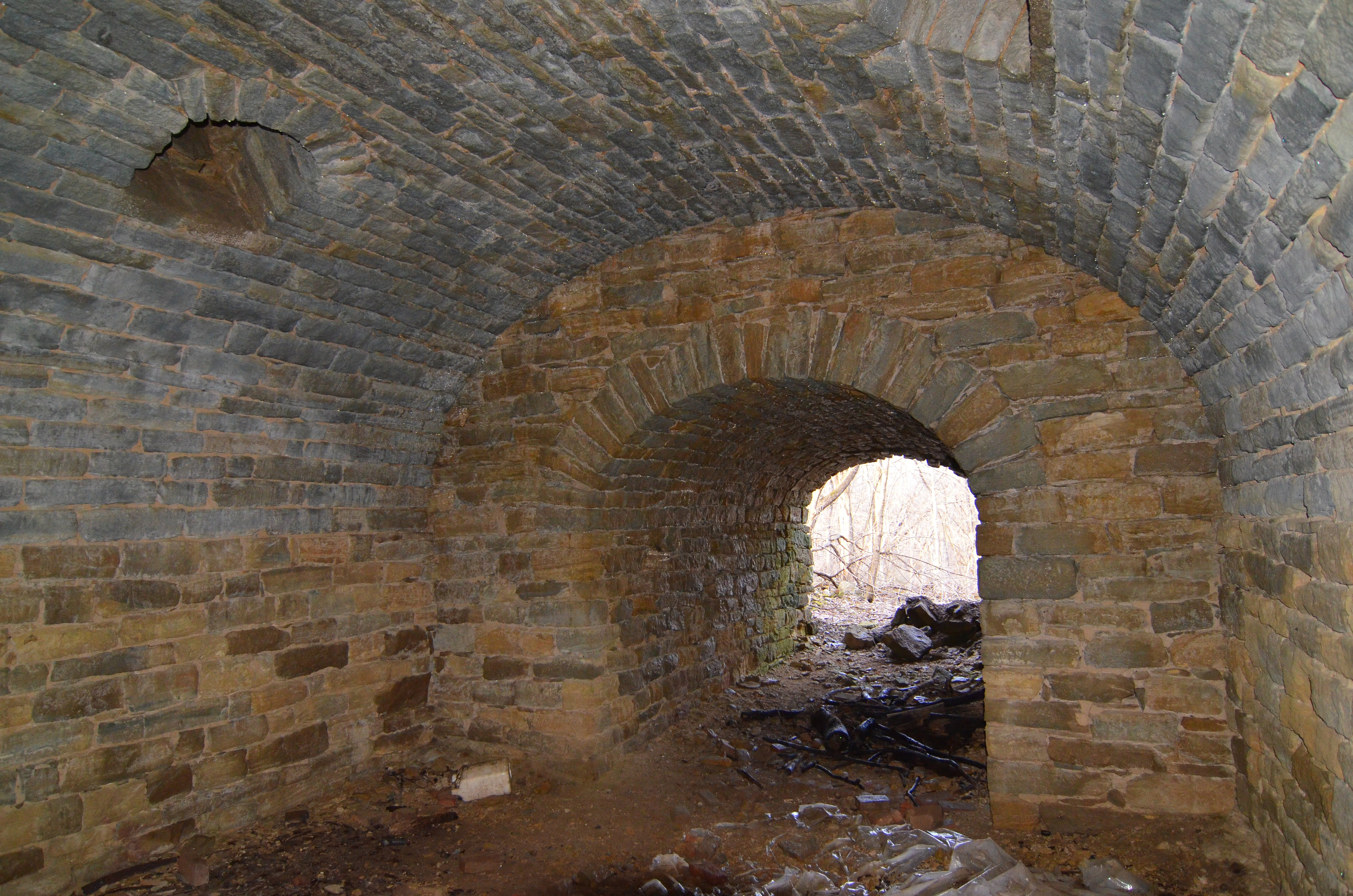

- Location within Illinois Location within the United States
- Location: Cedar Glen State Natural Area, Warsaw, Illinois
- Coordinates: 40°21′47″N 91°24′48″W
- NRHP reference No.: 100004624
- Added to NRHP: November 18, 2019

The Hunziker Winery Site is the site of a former winery in Cedar Glen State Natural Area near Warsaw, Illinois. The winery was established in the 1860s by vintner and Swiss immigrant Gottlieb Hunziker and his business partner William Hoffman. At the time, Hancock County was becoming a major winemaking region, and the Warsaw area was second only to Nauvoo as a wine center within the county. Hunziker's wine was well-regarded among his contemporaries, as he won multiple awards at the 1870 Iowa State Fair, held across the Mississippi River in Keokuk. Hunziker continued to produce wine until his death in 1893. The remains of the winery include the walls of its wine house, in which grapes were processed and fermented, and an underground wine cellar.

The building was added to the National Register of Historic Places on November 18, 2019.
