= Conscience Fund =

The Conscience Fund is one of three gift funds maintained by the United States Department of the Treasury and is used for voluntary contributions from people who have stolen from or defrauded the United States Government. The fund was created in 1811 and received US$5 during its first year and over US$5.7million during its first 175 years. The fund's name comes from a letter sent during the Civil War from a former Quartermaster in the Army to then-Treasurer of the United States Francis E. Spinner with a US$1500 check for previously misappropriated funds saying, "Suppose we call this a contribution to the conscience fund and get it announced in the newspapers, and perhaps we will get some more".

Donations given to the Conscience Fund vary in size and reason. A 9 cent donation was made by a person from Massachusetts who had reused a 3 cent postage stamp, while a person from Jersey City sent US$40,000 in several installments for US$8,000 he had previously taken. Another donor sent handmade quilts in an effort to settle her tax bill. Most gifts to the Conscience Fund are from anonymous donors. Others are forwarded by clergy who have received deathbed confessions. The sincerity of some donors' repentance can be uncertain, as demonstrated by a received letter reading, "Dear Internal Revenue Service, I have not been able to sleep at night because I cheated on last year's income tax. Enclosed find a cashier's check for $1,000. If I still can't sleep, I'll send you the balance."

Due to the fund's association with ill-gotten monies, some people object to having the funds they return associated with the fund. An example of this is when then-President Herbert Hoover and his Cabinet volunteered to reduce their pay in 1932 and instructed the Treasury to place the returned salary in the General Fund instead of the Conscience Fund.

Donations to the Conscience Fund are not tax deductible, although gifts to the U.S. Treasury through the U.S. Fund are.
