= Hugh W. and Sarah Sample House =

Historic house in Iowa, United States

- U.S. National Register of Historic Places
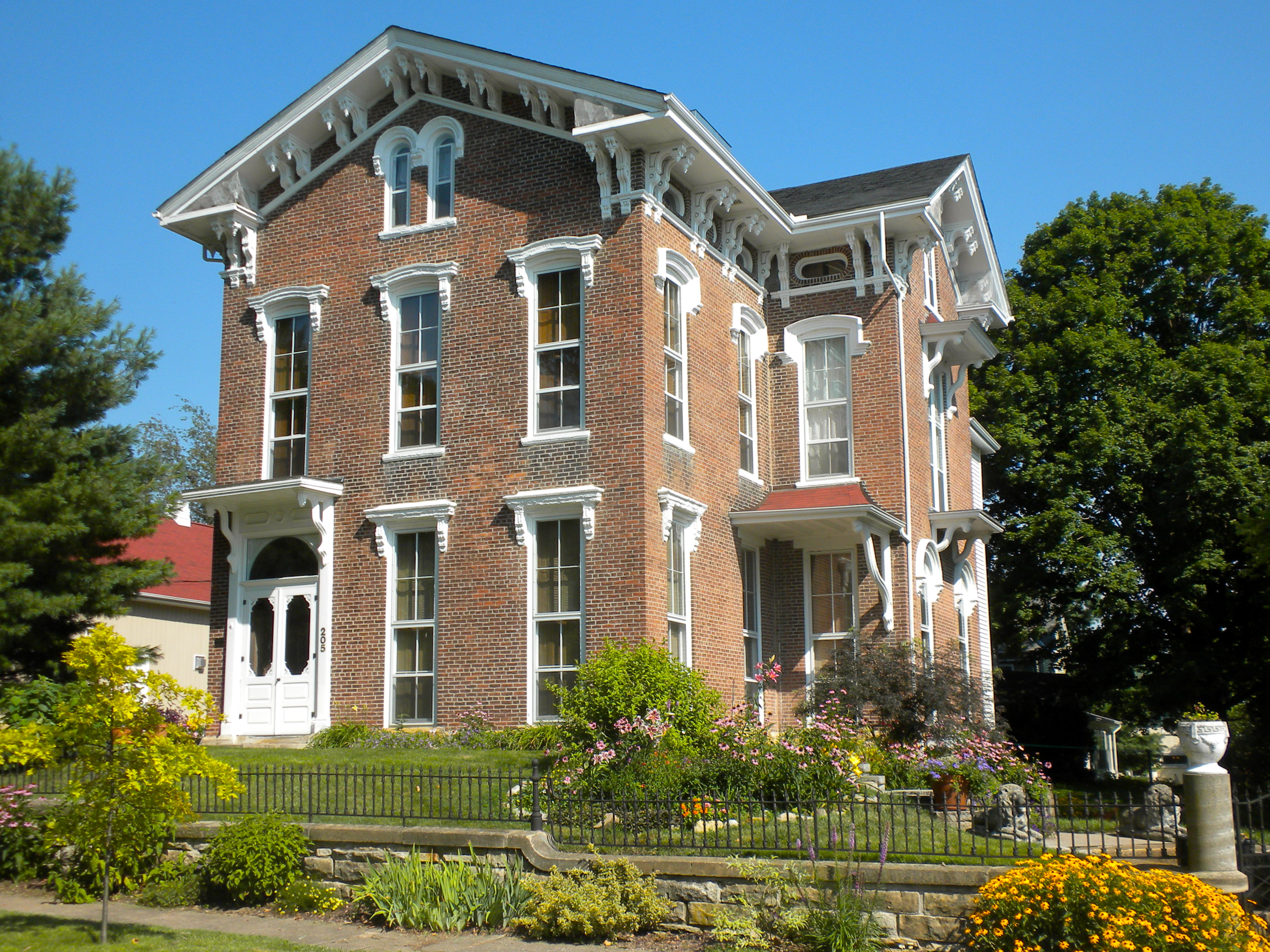

- Location within Iowa Location within the United States
- Location: 205 N. Second St. Keokuk, Iowa
- Coordinates: 40°23′40.7″N 91°22′41.8″W
- Area: less than one acre
- Built: 1859
- Architectural style: Italianate
- NRHP reference No.: 95001318
- Added to NRHP: November 22, 1995

The Hugh W. and Sarah Sample House is a historic building located in Keokuk, Iowa, United States. Hugh Sample became the mayor of Keokuk in 1858 and had the house built the following year. He lived in the residence until his death in 1870. The 2½-story structure was designed in the Italianate style and is considered the finest and most intact example of that style in Keokuk. It follows an irregular plan and features tall narrow windows capped with elaborated crowns, a low pitch gabled roof, and wide bracketed eaves. At one time the house had an ornate cupola. The rooms on the interior have 12-foot (3.7 m) ceilings The house was listed on the National Register of Historic Places in 1995.
