= C. R. Joy House =

Historic house in Iowa, United States

- U.S. National Register of Historic Places
- U.S. Historic district – Contributing property
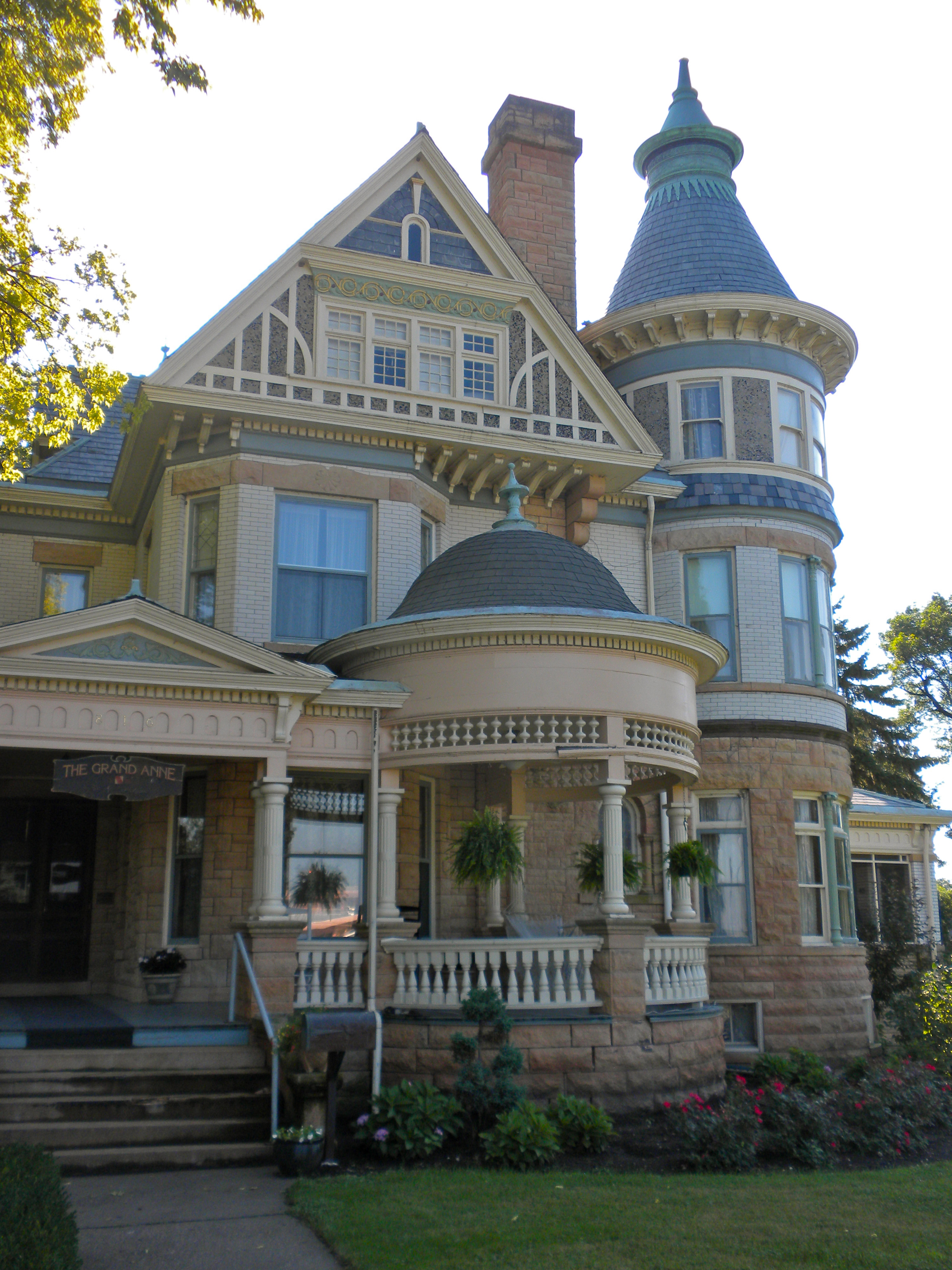

- Location within Iowa Location within the United States
- Location: 816 Grand Ave. Keokuk, Iowa
- Coordinates: 40°24′14.4″N 91°22′37.3″W
- Area: 2 acres (0.81 ha)
- Built: 1897
- Architect: George Franklin Barber
- Architectural style: Queen Anne
- Part of: The Park Place-Grand Avenue Residential District (ID02001020)
- NRHP reference No.: 96001587
- Added to NRHP: January 16, 1997

The C. R. Joy House, also known as The Grande Anne Bed & Breakfast, was a historic building located in Keokuk, Iowa, United States. It was destroyed by fire in July 2018. It was individually listed on the National Register of Historic Places in 1997. In 2002 it was included as a contributing property in The Park Place-Grand Avenue Residential District.

== History ==
The house was significant as one of the largest and most ornate residences in Keokuk, and its association with the Knoxville, Tennessee architectural firm of George Franklin Barber & Company, which designed it. Clyde Royal Joy, who had this Queen Anne style house built in 1897, was a local businessman that served as the national director of the YMCA. He employed the Cleveland decorating firm of Hungate & Bowman to design the house's interior. The lot across the street was once part of this property. It was planted as a formal garden, and offered views of the Mississippi River from the house. Joy sold the property to Karl and Irene Madden in 1945, and he died in 1951. It was the only Queen Anne-style house in the historic district that retained all of its details. After being restored, the building was most recently home to the Grande Anne bed and breakfast. This historic building suffered significant damage in an electrical fire on July 21, 2018.

== Architecture ==
The 2½-story residence featured a balloon frame built on a foundation of locally quarried stone. The interior diameter of the three-story corner tower was 11 feet (3.4 m). The first floor exterior was faced with a light buff sandstone laid in rock-faced broken ashlar with cut stone trim. The second floor was faced with white pressed brick manufactured by the St. Louis Pressed Brick Company. The house was capped with a hipped roof with cross gables and three chimneys. The asymmetrical wrap-around porch featured a turret at its north end and a pediment over its entry from the front walk.
