= Cambre House and Farm =

Historic house in Illinois, United States

- U.S. National Register of Historic Places
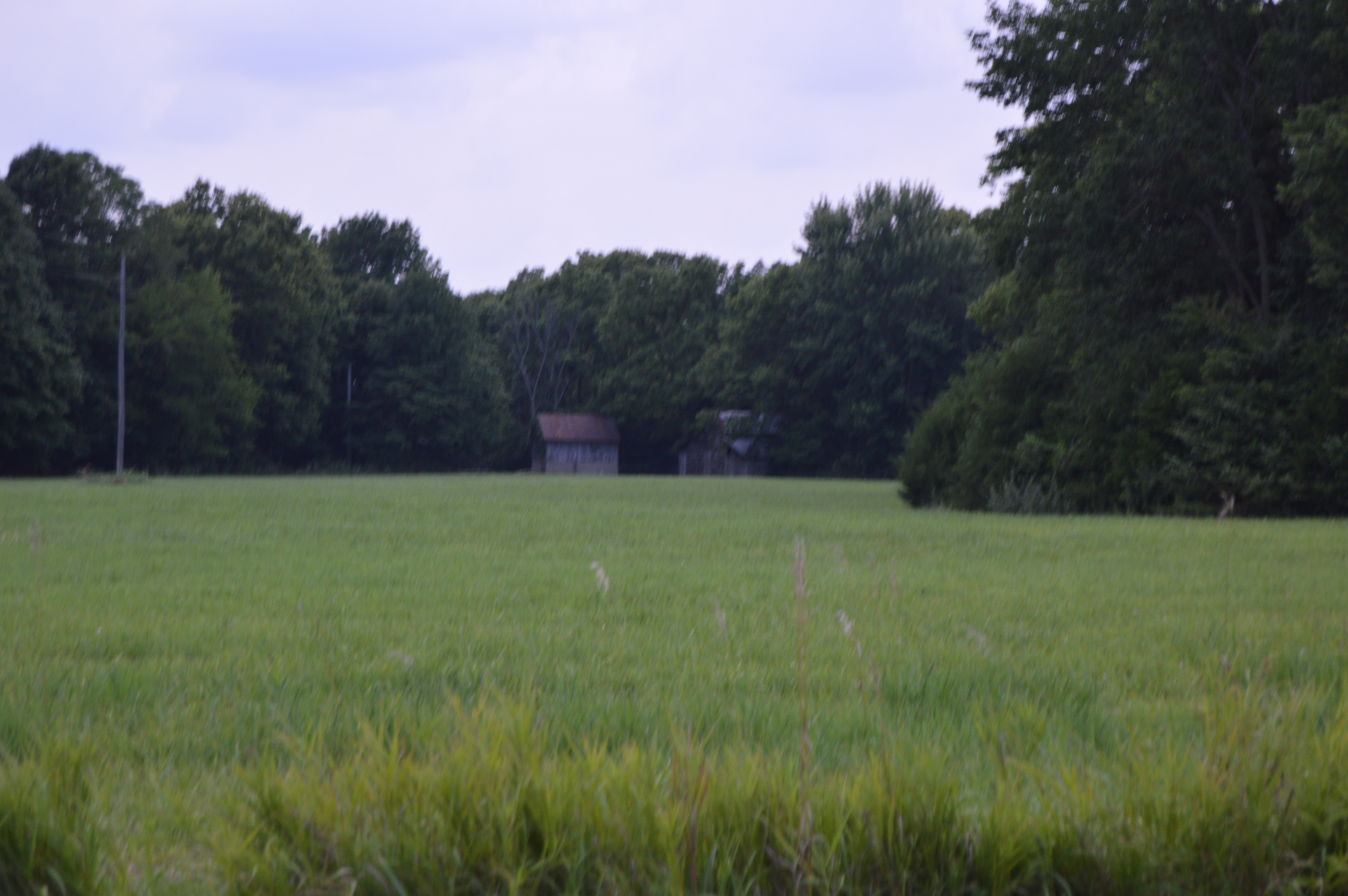
- Distant view of the farm

- Location within Illinois Location within the United States
- Nearest city: Niota, Illinois
- Coordinates: 40°35′38″N 91°20′35″W
- Area: 7.1 acres (2.9 ha)
- Built: 1867
- Built by: Cambre, Adolphe
- Architectural style: Anglicized Creole/Icarian
- NRHP reference No.: 84000308
- Added to NRHP: November 13, 1984

Cambre House and Farm is a historic farmstead located southwest of Niota, Hancock County, Illinois, United States. The farmhouse was built in 1867 by Adolphe Cambre, a French immigrant and member of Nauvoo's short-lived Icarian community. A carpenter by trade, Cambre designed several of the community's buildings while the Icarians occupied Nauvoo in the 1850s. While many of the Icarians resettled in Corning, Iowa after their Nauvoo colony failed, Cambre remained in Hancock County, eventually building the Creole-inspired house for his family. The house is similar in design to the Icarians' other buildings and is the only surviving Icarian-designed building in Hancock County.

The house was added to the National Register of Historic Places on November 13, 1984.
