= La Harpe Historic District =

Historic district in Illinois, United States

- LaHarpe Historic District
- U.S. National Register of Historic Places
- U.S. Historic district
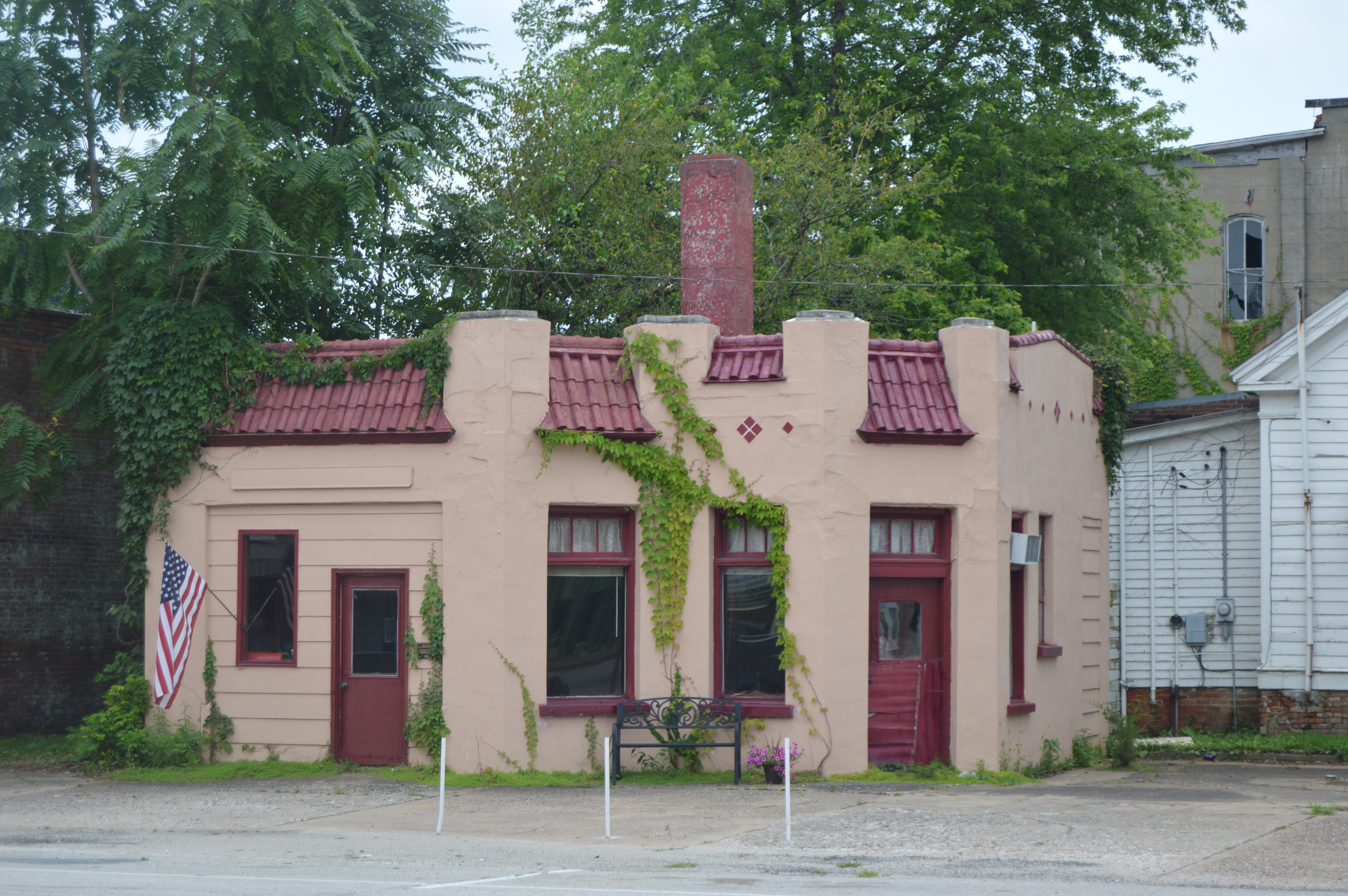
- Mission Revival gas station at Main and Center

- Location within Illinois Location within the United States
- Location: 100--124 W. Main St., 100--122 and 101--129 E. Main Sts., 101--121 S. Center St., and City Pk., LaHarpe, Illinois
- Coordinates: 40°35′0″N 90°58′10″W
- Area: 5 acres (2.0 ha)
- NRHP reference No.: 87000031
- Added to NRHP: April 30, 1987

The La Harpe Historic District is a historic district located in downtown La Harpe, Illinois. The district, which is primarily commercial, includes the 100 East and 100 West blocks of Main Street and the 100 South block of Center Street. While La Harpe was settled in the 1830s, most of its development took place after railroad service came to the city in 1865. The city became a regional service center for the surrounding agricultural areas, and the commercial buildings constructed during this late 19th century economic boom form the core of the district. The buildings are primarily red brick commercial structures, some of which have decorative storefronts; the three outliers are a frame house, an Italianate commercial building, and a Mission Revival gas station from the early twentieth century. La Harpe's economy and population stabilized after 1900, and the district has remained mostly unchanged since.

The district was added to the National Register of Historic Places on April 30, 1987.
