= Keokuk Young Women's Christian Association Building =

- U.S. National Register of Historic Places
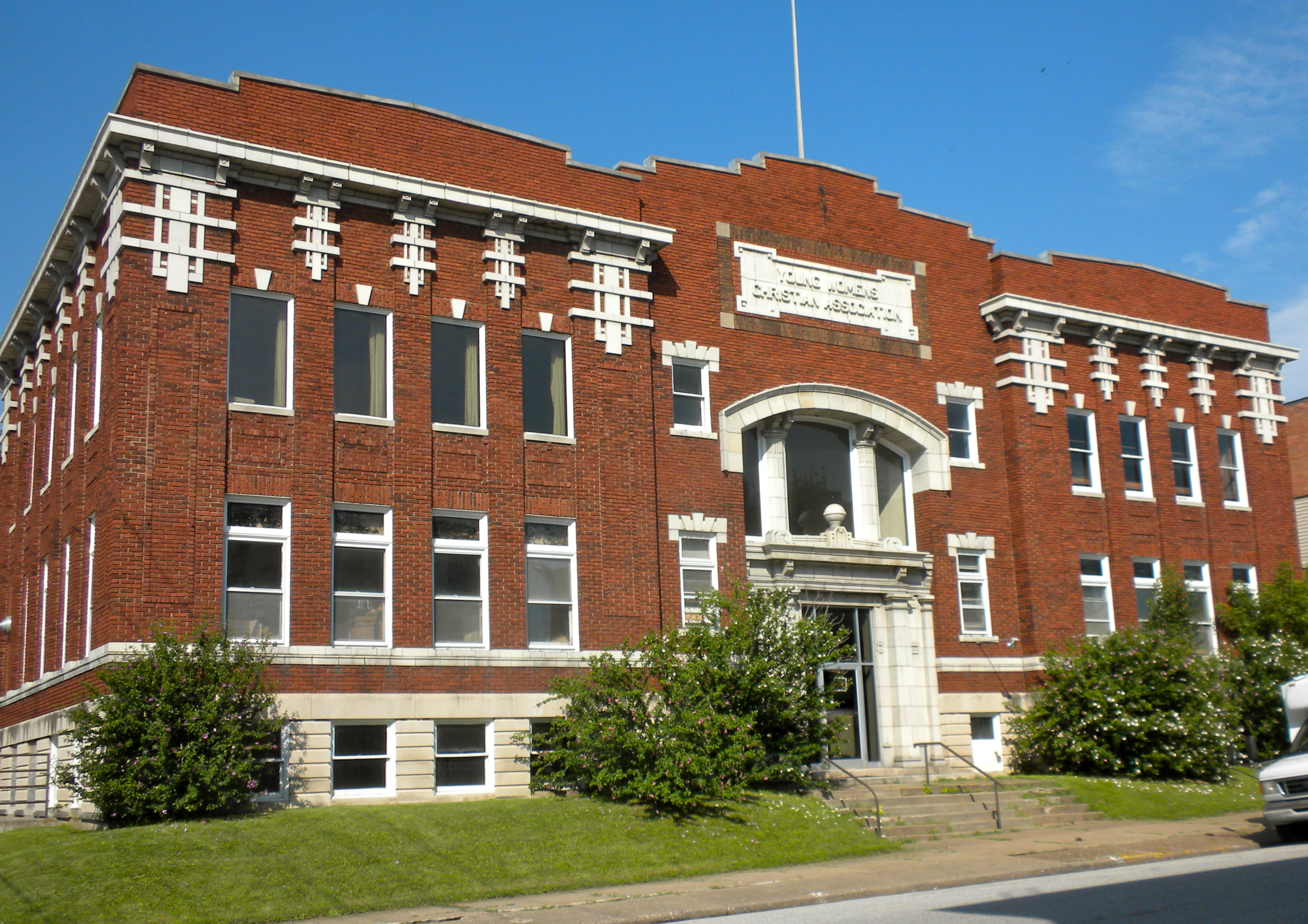

- Location within Iowa Location within the United States
- Location: 425 Blondeau St. Keokuk, Iowa
- Coordinates: 40°23′47″N 91°22′54″W
- Area: Less than one acre
- Built: 1913
- Architect: Harry A. Ratcliffe
- Architectural style: Late 19th & early 20th Century American Movements
- NRHP reference No.: 04001140
- Added to NRHP: October 12, 2004

The Keokuk Young Women's Christian Association Building is a historic building located in Keokuk, Iowa, United States. It was listed on the National Register of Historic Places in 2004.

The local YWCA was organized in 1905 and initially leased space for their activities. The land for this building was donated by Gerard Huiskamp. Completed in 1913, the building was designed by local architect Harry E. Ratcliffe. It is representative of transitional architecture in the early 20th century. The two-story brick structure is built on top of a full basement. It features Art Deco tile ornamentation. The exposed basement level is concrete that is designed to look like stone.

In addition to the YWCA, the building served as a hub for social activities in the community. It was home to the YWCA for nearly 50 years until it merged with the YMCA, which sat across the street. From 1953 to 1975, both buildings were used by the combined organization. In 1975 a modern facility replaced the two older buildings, and the former YMCA building, which had been built in 1899, was torn down that year. In 1976 the first floor of the former YWCA building was renovated for use as the courthouse for southern Lee County. Those functions were transferred to the former United States Post Office and Courthouse in 1994.
