= Frank J. Weess House =

Historic house in Iowa, United States

- U.S. National Register of Historic Places
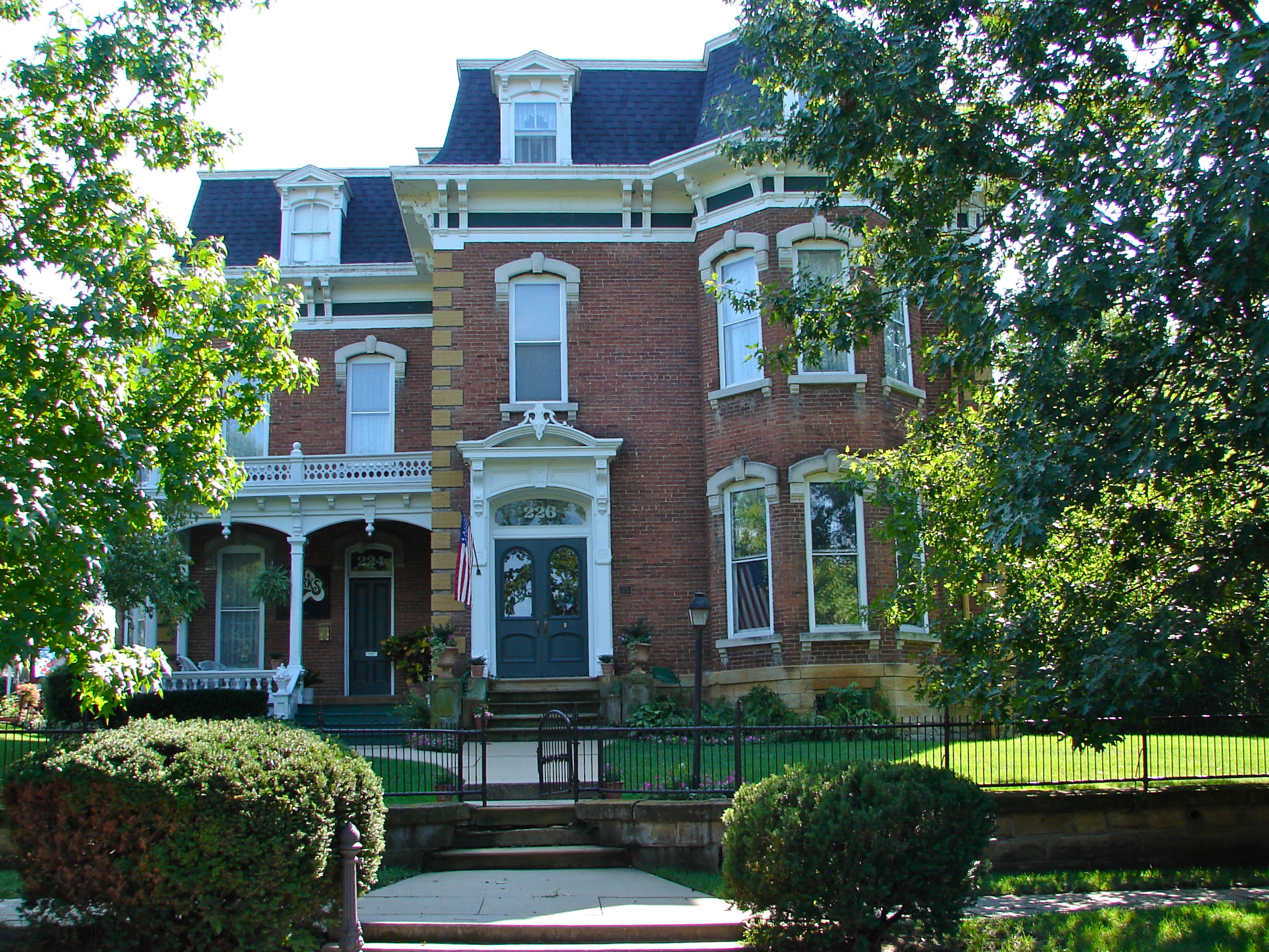

- Location within Iowa Location within the United States
- Location: 224-226 Morgan St. Keokuk, Iowa
- Coordinates: 40°23′47″N 91°22′39″W
- Area: less than one acre
- Built: 1880-1881
- Architectural style: Second Empire
- NRHP reference No.: 78001235
- Added to NRHP: May 22, 1978

The Frank J. Weess House is a historic building located in Keokuk, Iowa, United States. Built from 1880 to 1881, it is considered a fine, although a rather restrained, example of the Second Empire style. The relative restraint of the rest of the house allows the architectural focus of the structure to be its rather elaborate main entrance and front porch. The two-story brick structure is capped by a mansard roof with bracketed eaves and pedimented dormer windows. The windows on the rest of the house are capped with stone hoods. It was listed on the National Register of Historic Places in 1978.

Frank J. Wees was a native of the Netherlands and came to the United States in 1849. He was a butcher by trade and by 1860 he established a successful meat business in Keokuk. He also owned considerable amounts of real estate in the area.
