= Fort Madison Downtown Commercial Historic District =

Historic district in Iowa, United States

- U.S. National Register of Historic Places
- U.S. Historic district
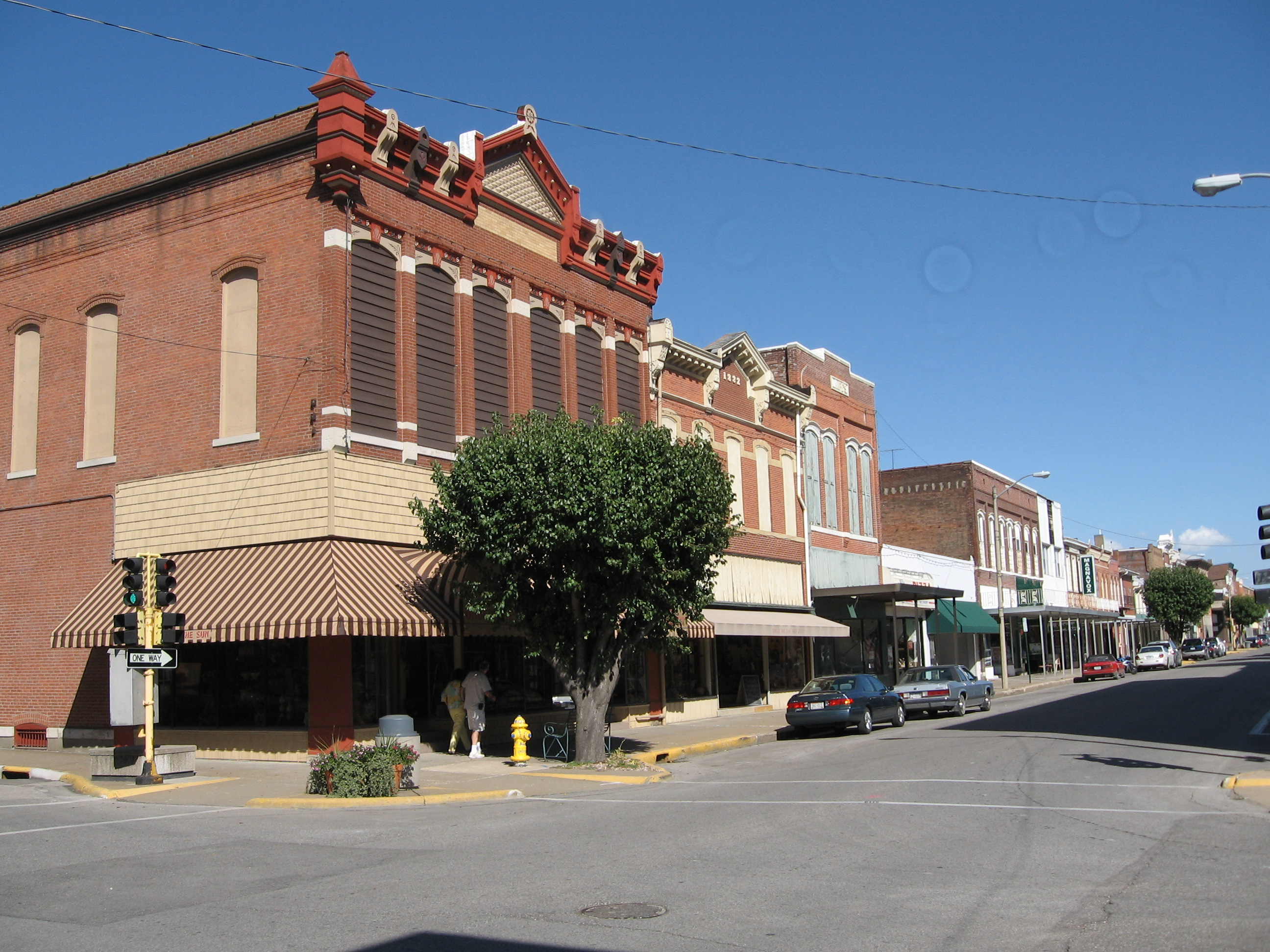

- Location within Iowa Location within the United States
- Location: Centered on Ave. G, from near 6th St., to mid-900 Blk, inc. Ave. H from 7th to 9th, Fort Madison, Iowa
- Coordinates: 40°37′51″N 91°18′40″W
- Area: 17 acres (6.9 ha)
- Architectural style: Federal; Italianate; Romanesque Revival
- MPS: Iowa's Main Street Commercial Architecture MPS
- NRHP reference No.: 07000852
- Added to NRHP: August 31, 2007

The Fort Madison Downtown Commercial Historic District has a collection of late-19th century store fronts centered on Ave. G, from 6th to 9th Street, and Ave. H from 7th to 9th, in Fort Madison, Iowa. It was listed on the National Register of Historic Places in 2007.

The Mississippi River at Fort Madison flows from east to west. The city's downtown is on the east side of town north of the river. It includes the original part of the city, and the rest of the city grew to the west. The central business district is surrounded by residential neighborhoods with the Park-to-Park Residential Historic District to the north. The Atchison, Topeka and Santa Fe Passenger and Freight Complex Historic District is to the southwest closer to the river. Avenue H, historically Front Street, faces the river and was developed first. Buildings were only constructed on the north side of the street, and it still has its older, 19th-century buildings. Avenue G, historically 2nd Street, was developed as the main business street from the late 19th and into the early 20th century. From east to west, development occurred between Sixth and Eighth Streets. By the 20th century, commercial buildings were built to Ninth Street and beyond.

At the time of its nomination the historic district had a total of 105 buildings, with 91 being contributing properties and 14 non-contributing. Most of the buildings (72) are two-story structures, with another 18 one-story buildings, and 15 three-story buildings. The predominant architectural styles are Federal, Italianate, Renaissance Revival, and Romanesque Revival. Most of the buildings house commercial enterprises, and the Cattermole Memorial Library, which is individually listed on the National Register, is included as a contributing property.
