= The Park Place-Grand Avenue Residential District =

Historic district in Iowa, United States

- U.S. National Register of Historic Places
- U.S. Historic district
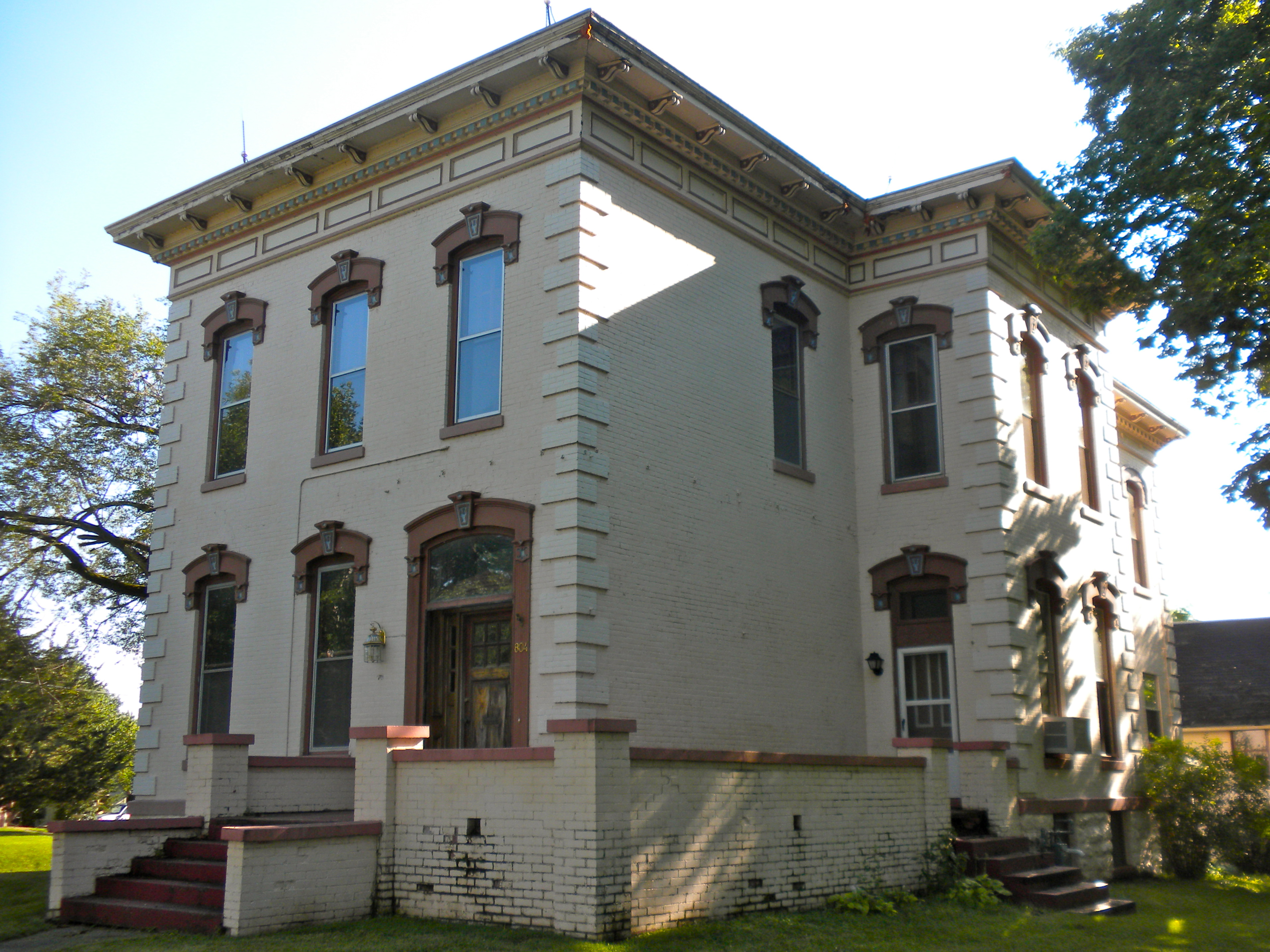
- John R. and Julia A. Shuler House (1887)

- Location within Iowa Location within the United States
- Location: 4th at Park Place and Orleans St. and N up Grand Ave. to Rand Park, Keokuk, Iowa
- Coordinates: 40°24′18″N 91°22′36″W
- Area: 43.3 acres (17.5 ha)
- Architectural style: Late Victorian
- NRHP reference No.: 02001020
- Added to NRHP: September 12, 2002

The Park Place-Grand Avenue Residential District is a nationally recognized historic district located in Keokuk, Iowa, United States. It was listed on the National Register of Historic Places in 2002. At the time of its nomination it consisted of 75 resources, which included 60 contributing buildings, one contributing structure, and 14 non-contributing buildings.

The area was where successful Keokuk businessmen built their homes. It was known as the "best place to live in Keokuk." and still holds that distinction. The Park Place/Grand Avenue Historic district features 146 years of architecture from 1856 until 2002. In 1856, Charles Mason, a former Chief Justice of the Iowa Territory, platted Mason's Upper Addition to the city of Keokuk. This area extends from 10th avenue on the north to the river bluff edge on the south. The city was in the midst of a building boom at the time, and half-dozen houses were built before the Financial Panic of 1857. After the Panic, there was a slow development of Park Place from 4th to 5th and Grand Avenue from 6th to 10th. As individual businessmen prospered, they built houses along the Avenue.

The houses along Orleans and Park Place on the southern end of the district are generally smaller and built on more compact lots than those further north along Grand Avenue. Most of the newer homes are located north of Tenth Street. It is believed that most of the homes are architect-designed even though only a few names are known, and they follow a variety of architectural designs that were popular at the time they were built.

The John N. and Mary L. (Rankin) Irwin House (1856) and the C. R. Joy House (1897) are individually listed on the National Register of Historic Places.(The Joy house was destroyed by fire in 2018).

Other homes of interest include the home built by Samuel T. Marshall, co-founder of Beta Theta Pi Fraternity, a home designed by Barry Byrne (a student of Frank Lloyd Wright), the Corydon Rich mansion built in 1918 on part of the former J.C. Hubinger estate, and the residence of Jean (Mrs. Felix) Hughes, grandmother of Howard Hughes. The home was built without closets because Mrs. Hughes believed that closets bred moths and disease

Keokuk was a vital hub for the Union during the Civil War. More than 80,000 soldiers from throughout Iowa were staged at some point in Keokuk as they were shipped off to the various western fronts of the war and was the home of General Samuel Curtis, mayor of Keokuk 1856-1861. The city became the location for four Union army camps and four hospitals to care for wounded troops from April 17, 1862, until October 1, 1865. After the war ended, many veterans returned to Keokuk to settle and start businesses along the Mississippi and Des Moines rivers. One pre-war resident was Samuel Clemons, who worked in his older brother Orion's printing business in 1855-1857 and he gave his first after-dinner talk in January 1856 before he became an author with the pen name Mark Twain. He also purchased a home for his mother, Jane Clemons, in Keokuk in 1889 and she lived there until her death in 1890.
