= Cyrus Felt House =

Historic house in Illinois, United States

- U.S. National Register of Historic Places
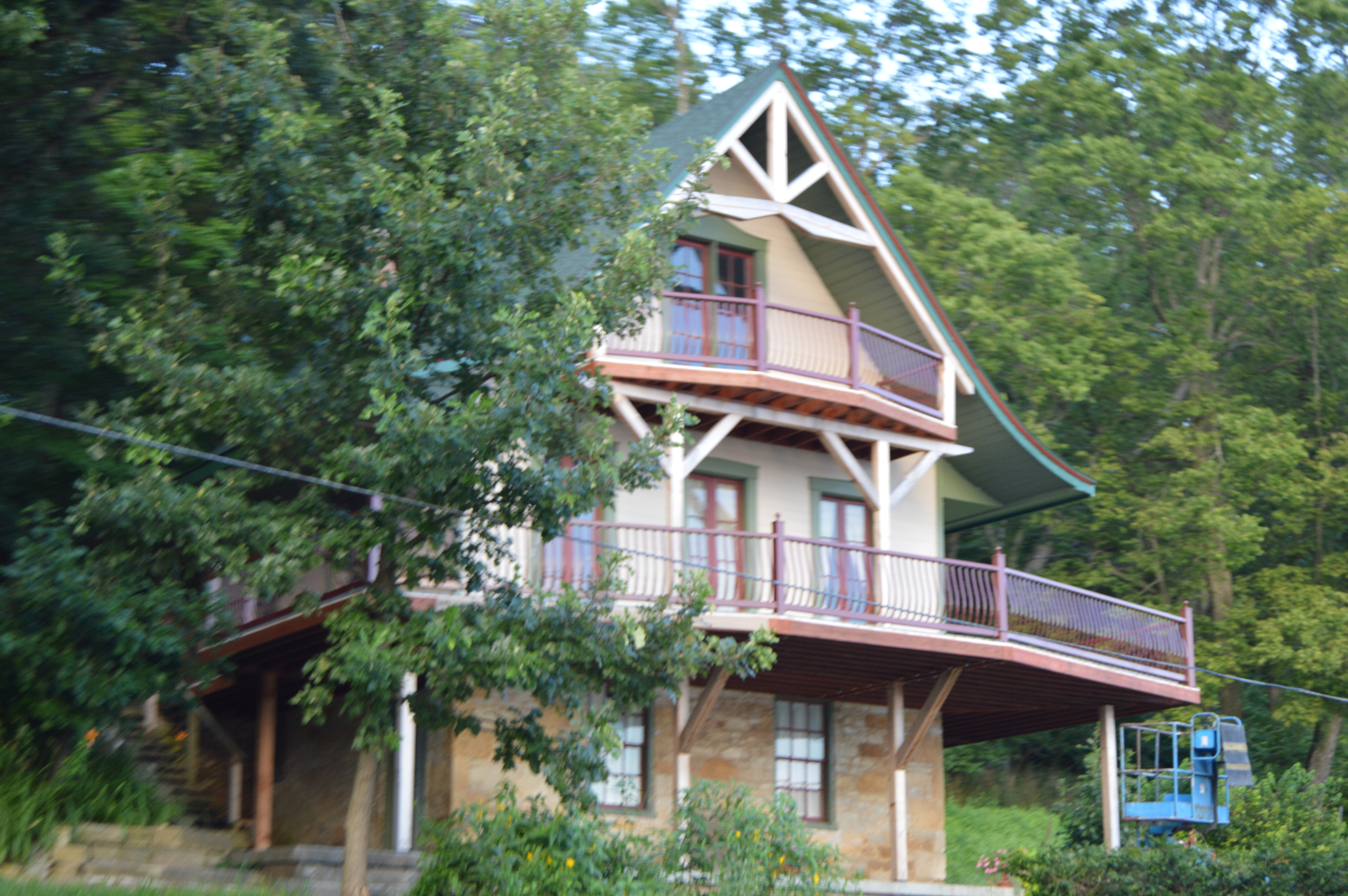

- Location within Illinois Location within the United States
- Nearest city: Hamilton, Illinois
- Coordinates: 40°26′1″N 91°22′11″W
- Area: less than one acre
- Built: c. 1834
- Architectural style: Greek Revival
- NRHP reference No.: 80001366
- Added to NRHP: March 18, 1980

The Cyrus Felt House is a historic house located along the Mississippi River and Illinois Route 96 3 miles (4.8 km) north of Hamilton, Illinois. The house was built circa 1834 by Cyrus Felt, a New Hampshire native who moved to Hancock County in the early 1830s. Felt was a prominent citizen of the town of Montebello, which was the second-oldest town in the county but has since been abandoned. Felt's house has a French-inspired design, likely influenced by the area's substantial French population, with Greek Revival details. The house's porches, columns and roof line give it its predominant French character, while its window and door heads are its most prominent Greek Revival features.

The house was added to the National Register of Historic Places on March 18, 1980.
