= Primrose Mill =

- U.S. National Register of Historic Places
- Location within Iowa Location within the United States
- Location: County Road J56; Primrose, Iowa
- Coordinates: 40°40′31″N 91°38′16″W
- Area: less than one acre
- Built: 1871
- Architect: J.B. Pierce
- NRHP reference No.: 83000383
- Added to NRHP: March 17, 1983

Primrose Mill is a historic structure located in the unincorporated community of Primrose, Iowa, United States. It was listed on the National Register of Historic Places in 1983. The steam powered flour mill was established in 1871 by J.W. Pierce. Pierce immigrated to the United States from Prussia in 1861 and settled in Primrose seven years later where he worked as a dry goods merchant. The mill provided both commercial and custom grinding. While it was in continuous operation into the 20th century, the mill experienced a rapid succession of operators during those years.

The mill itself is a three-story, rectangular, brick structure capped with a combination gambrel-jerkinhead roof. It is built on a limestone foundation. A corbelled brick frieze with a dentil pattern and a corbelled cornice follows the eaves line around the building. The cornice is partly returned at each corner. A Gothic gable dormer with a tall arched window is centered on each side of the roof. Its founding and operation is associated with the German population of the village, which may also explain the high degree of craftsmanship and the attention to decorative details found on the building.
