= Harrison Township, Lee County, Iowa =

Township in Lee County, Iowa, U.S.

Coordinates: 40.683°N 91.661°W

Harrison Township is a township in Lee County, Iowa. The unincorporated community of Primrose lies within the township.

== History ==
Harrison Township was organized in 1841.

== Notable people ==
- Richard Proenneke (1916-2003) - naturalist, subject of books and documentary
