= John N. and Mary L. (Rankin) Irwin House =

Historic house in Iowa, United States

- U.S. National Register of Historic Places
- U.S. Historic district – Contributing property
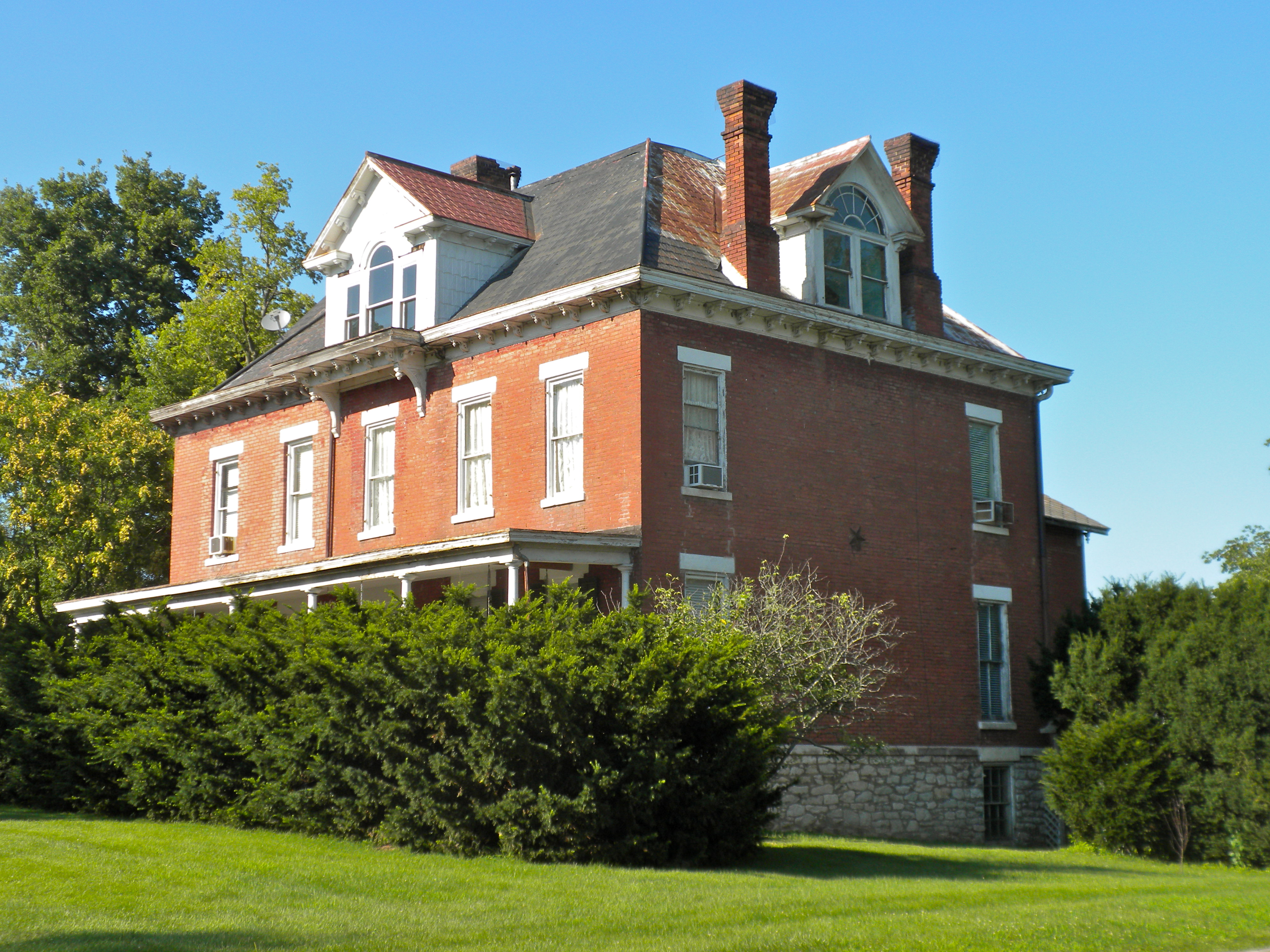

- Location within Iowa Location within the United States
- Location: 633 Grand Ave. Keokuk, Iowa
- Coordinates: 40°24′08.4″N 91°22′32.4″W
- Area: less than one acre
- Built: 1856
- Built by: John Daugherty
- Part of: The Park Place-Grand Avenue Residential District (ID02001020)
- NRHP reference No.: 99001206
- Added to NRHP: October 14, 1999

The John N. and Mary L. (Rankin) Irwin House is a historic building located in Keokuk, Iowa, United States. It was individually listed on the National Register of Historic Places in 1999. In 2002 it was included as a contributing property in The Park Place-Grand Avenue Residential District.

== History ==
The house was originally built by James F. Daugherty who bought the property from Judge Charles Mason in 1856. Its historical significance is its association with John N. Irwin. He was a lawyer and local businessman who served two terms in the Iowa House of Representatives, five terms as mayor of Keokuk, territorial governor of the Idaho Territory, and the Arizona Territory. He also served as the U.S. minister to Portugal. Irwin bought the house and raised his family here with his wife Mary after his time in Idaho. He lived here until he died in 1905.

== Architecture ==
This is the oldest house in The Park Place-Grand Avenue Residential District. It reflects a combination of architectural styles, namely Greek Revival, Italianate, and Neoclassical. It is not known what the house looked like when it was originally built, but it is thought the Greek Revival elements on the lower part of the house may be an indicator of its style. The 2½-story structure is composed of brick with a limestone foundation and a hip roof with a bracketed cornice. A large dormer with a Palladian window is located in the center of the main facade. The front porch is not original and is thought to date to the turn of the 20th century. Other changes were made during Irwin's ownership. A ballroom was located at the top of the house, but on warm summer evenings the parties were moved to the backyard, which was all brick at the time. It has subsequently been landscaped. The house is located at the crest of a bluff that overlooks the Mississippi River and Lock and Dam No. 19.
