= Primrose, Iowa =

- Unincorporated community
- Location within Iowa Location within the United States
- Coordinates: 40°40′31″N 91°38′17″W
- Country: United States
- State: Iowa
- County: Lee
- Elevation: 712 ft (217 m)
- Time zone: UTC-6 (Central (CST))
  - Summer (DST): UTC-5 (CDT)
- ZIP code: 52625
- Area code: 319
- GNIS feature ID: 460452

Primrose is an unincorporated community in Lee County, Iowa, United States.

== Location ==
Primrose is located in Harrison Township, near the junction of Primrose Road and 150th Avenue, about 4.5 miles (7,200 meters) northwest of Donnellson.

== History ==
Primrose was laid out by George W. Perkins and James H. Washburn in 1844. It was named Primrose by Minerva McCulloch, an early resident, after the wild roses that grew in the area. A post office was established in Primrose in 1845, with Exum McCulloch serving as the first postmaster.

Primrose had become well established by 1850. Most settlers of the town were German immigrants from Bavaria and Lower Saxony; sermons at the church were given in German until World War I. A two-story school was built in Primrose in 1850, which served 130 students at its peak. By 1868, Primrose contained blacksmith shops, coopers, doctors' offices, a mill, and several hotels and general stores.

Primrose's population was recorded at 178 in 1878, which had decreased to 150 by 1914 and 65 by 1940. The post office closed in 1953. Today Primrose consists only of a few houses.

== Notable people ==
- Richard Proenneke (1916–2003), naturalist, conservationist, and writer
