= Pennsylvania barn =

Type of banked barn

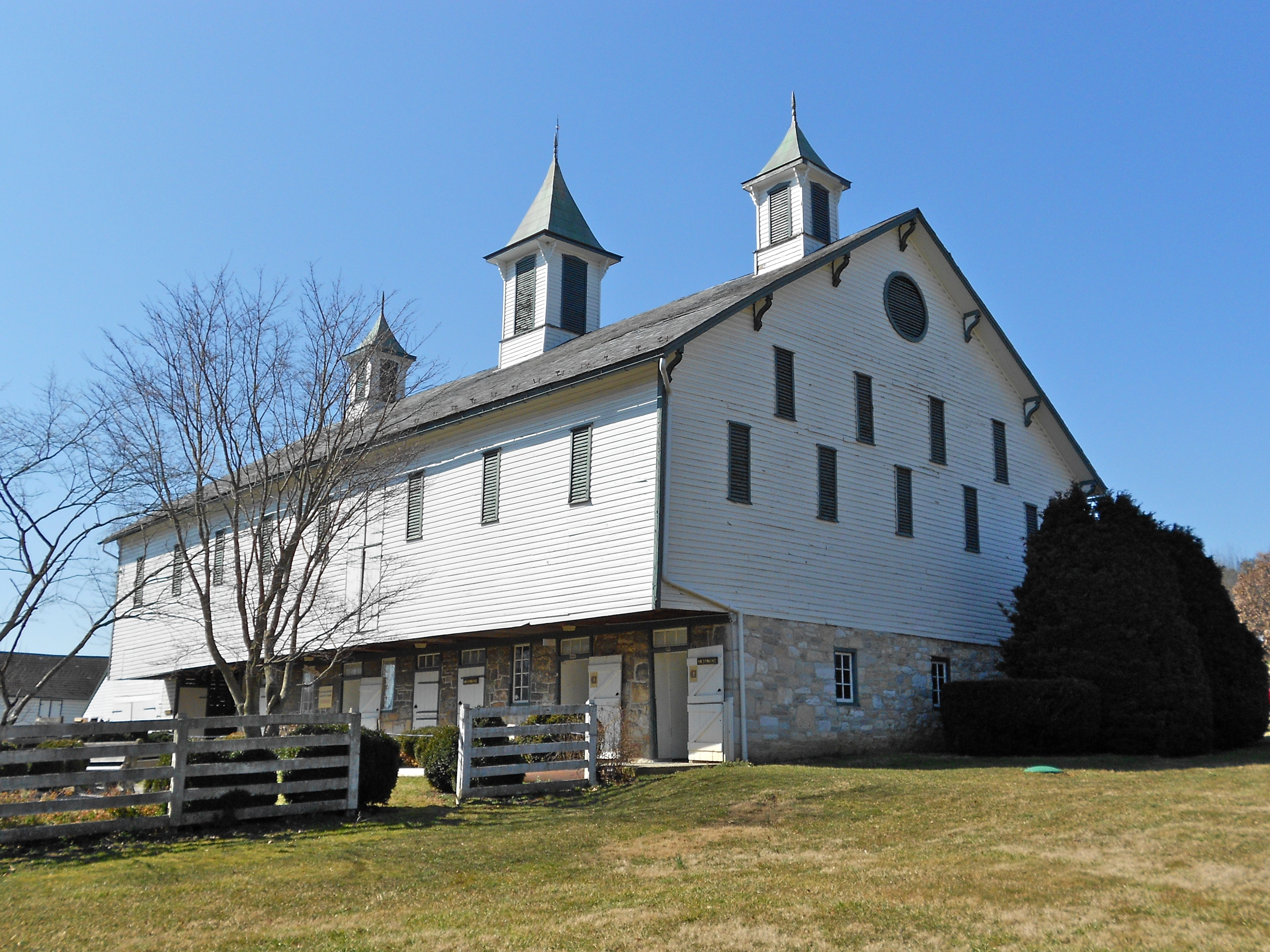
Royer-Nicodemus Barn, a standard Pennsylvania Barn

A Pennsylvania barn is a type of bank barn built in the United States from about 1790 to 1900. The style's most distinguishing feature is an overshoot or forebay, an area where one or more walls overshoot its foundation. These barns were banked and set into a hillside to ensure easy access to the basement and the level above. Almost all Pennsylvania barns also have gable roofs. Barn scholar Robert Ensminger classified the Pennsylvania barn into three types: Standard Pennsylvania, Sweitzer, and Extended Pennsylvania barns. The Pennsylvania-style barns were also built in the Shenandoah Valley, as well as west of Pennsylvania and in Canada.

== Standard Pennsylvania barn ==
"The Standard Pennsylvania barn is the most numerous and widely distributed class of the Pennsylvania barns." These were built between 1790 and 1890. The key characteristic in identifying this type is the forebay, built so that the gable end is symmetrical, with both front and rear walls being the same height.

== Sweitzer barn ==
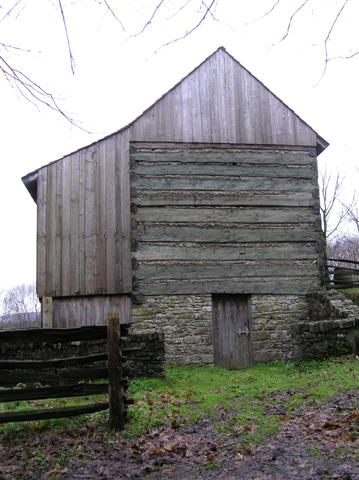
Sweitzer or Swisser type of Pennsylvania Log Barn, Ulster American Folkpark - geograph.org.uk - 289300

Sweitzer barns are also known as Swetzer or Swisser. The name reflects the barn's probable origin in Switzerland. The Sweitzer is the "original Pennsylvania barn"; it was initially a log crib-type barn built between 1730 and 1850. The distinguishing feature of this type of forebay barn is that the forebay projects in a way that the gable end is asymmetrical.

== Extended Pennsylvania barn ==
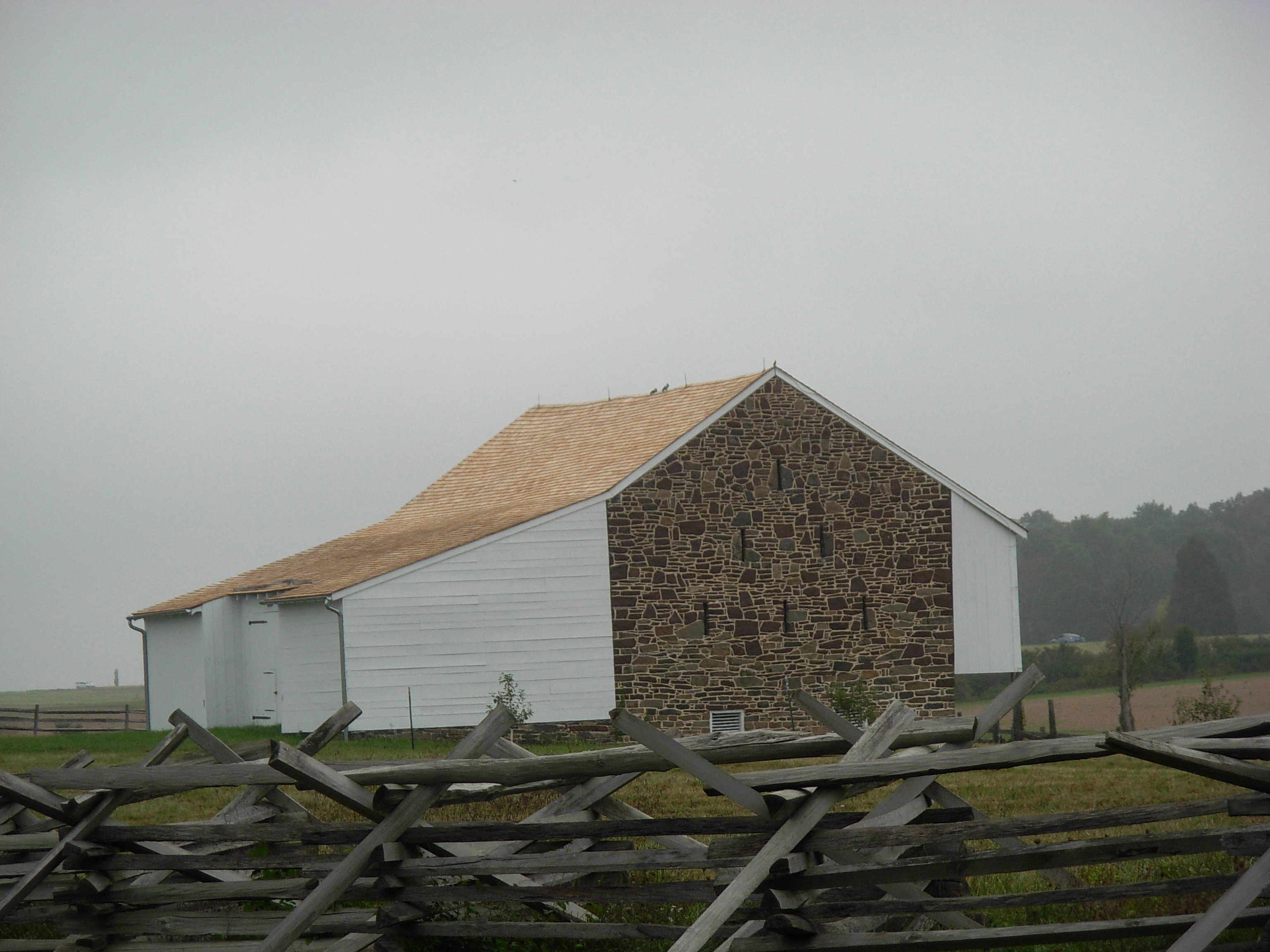
An extended Swisser type Pennsylvania barn at Gettysburg National Military Park

As agricultural productivity increased, the Standard Pennsylvania barn was not large enough, and this third class of barn was developed by adding to the Standard barn. New barns were based on the Standard but with more space added to the forebay side, ramp side, or by being made taller and adding another floor (storey) level.
