= George E. Schlapp House =

Historic house in Iowa, United States

- U.S. National Register of Historic Places
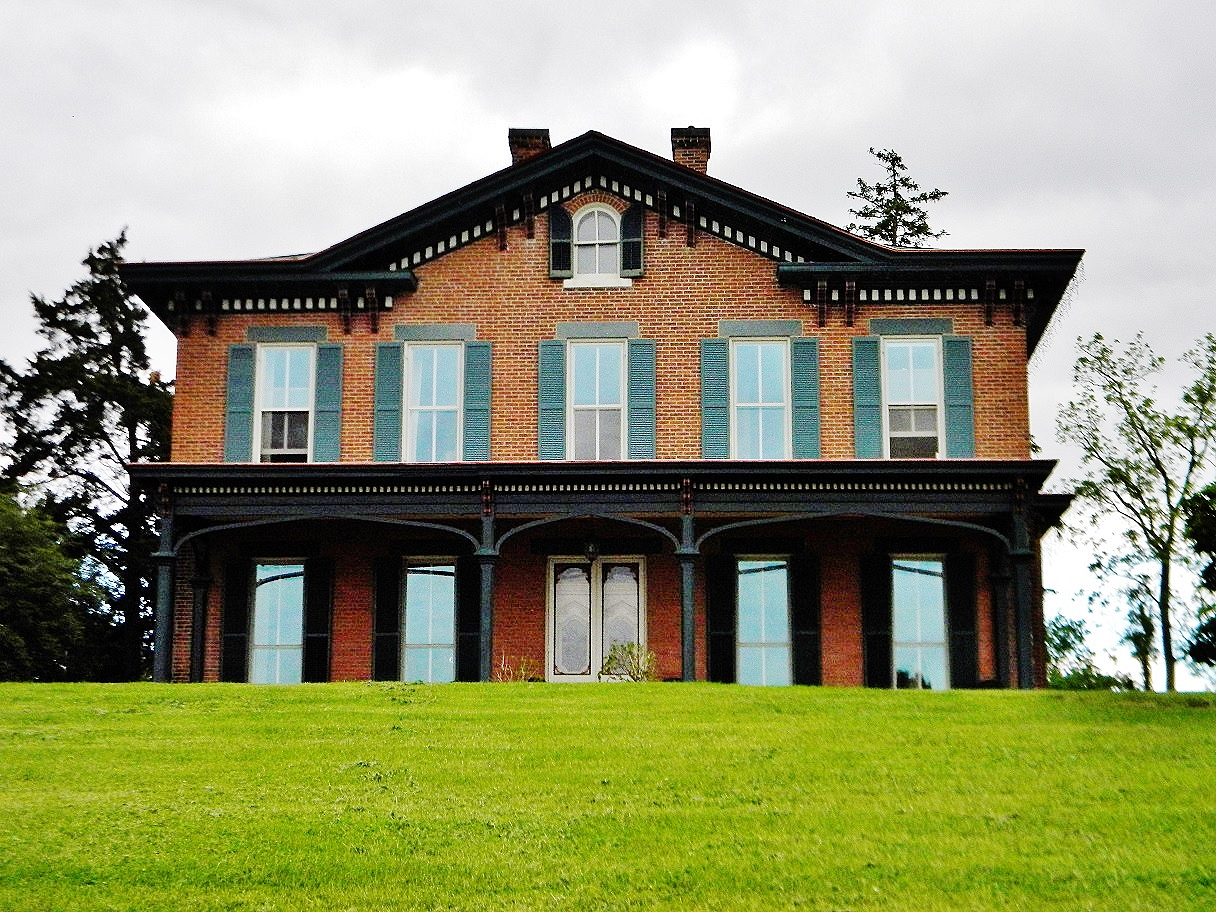

- Location within Iowa Location within the United States
- Location: 639 Ave. C Fort Madison, Iowa
- Coordinates: 40°38′09″N 91°18′32″W
- Area: 8 acres (3.2 ha)
- Built: c. 1870
- Architectural style: Italianate
- NRHP reference No.: 82002627
- Added to NRHP: February 4, 1982

The George E. Schlapp House is a historic residence located in Fort Madison, Iowa, United States. It was listed on the National Register of Historic Places in 1982.

George E. Schlapp was born in 1839 in what is now Germany. He immigrated with his family to the United States when he was twelve years old, and they had settled in Lee County, Iowa by 1853. Schlapp started working in the brewing business by 1858. He built his own brewery on Front Street, now Avenue H, in 1866. His brother Henry joined him in 1871, and the brewery became known as George Schlapp and Brother. George Schlapp was also involved in banking, the development of the Fort Madison Western Narrow Gauge Railroad, and as a stock broker. He married Mary Dupuis in 1863 and they had six children. The exact date this house was built is unknown, but it is thought to have been built in the early 1870s. George Schlapp lived here until he died in 1912, and the house remained in the family until 1968.

The house is considered to be the best example of Italianate architecture in Fort Madison. The 2½-story, brick house sits on a bluff overlooking the city and the Mississippi River below. The rectangular main block is almost square, and it has a smaller, two-story wing in the back. It is capped with a hipped roof that is pierced by four symmetrically spaced interior brick chimneys with corbelled caps. The cornice that surrounds the house features elaborately carved, paired wooden brackets and dentils under the eaves. At the top of the main facade is a triangular pediment with a single round arch window. There is a flat area on top of the roof that suggests a widow's walk, but there is no evidence that it was ever built.
