= Warsaw Historic District (Warsaw, Illinois) =

Historic district in Illinois, United States

- U.S. National Register of Historic Places
- U.S. Historic district
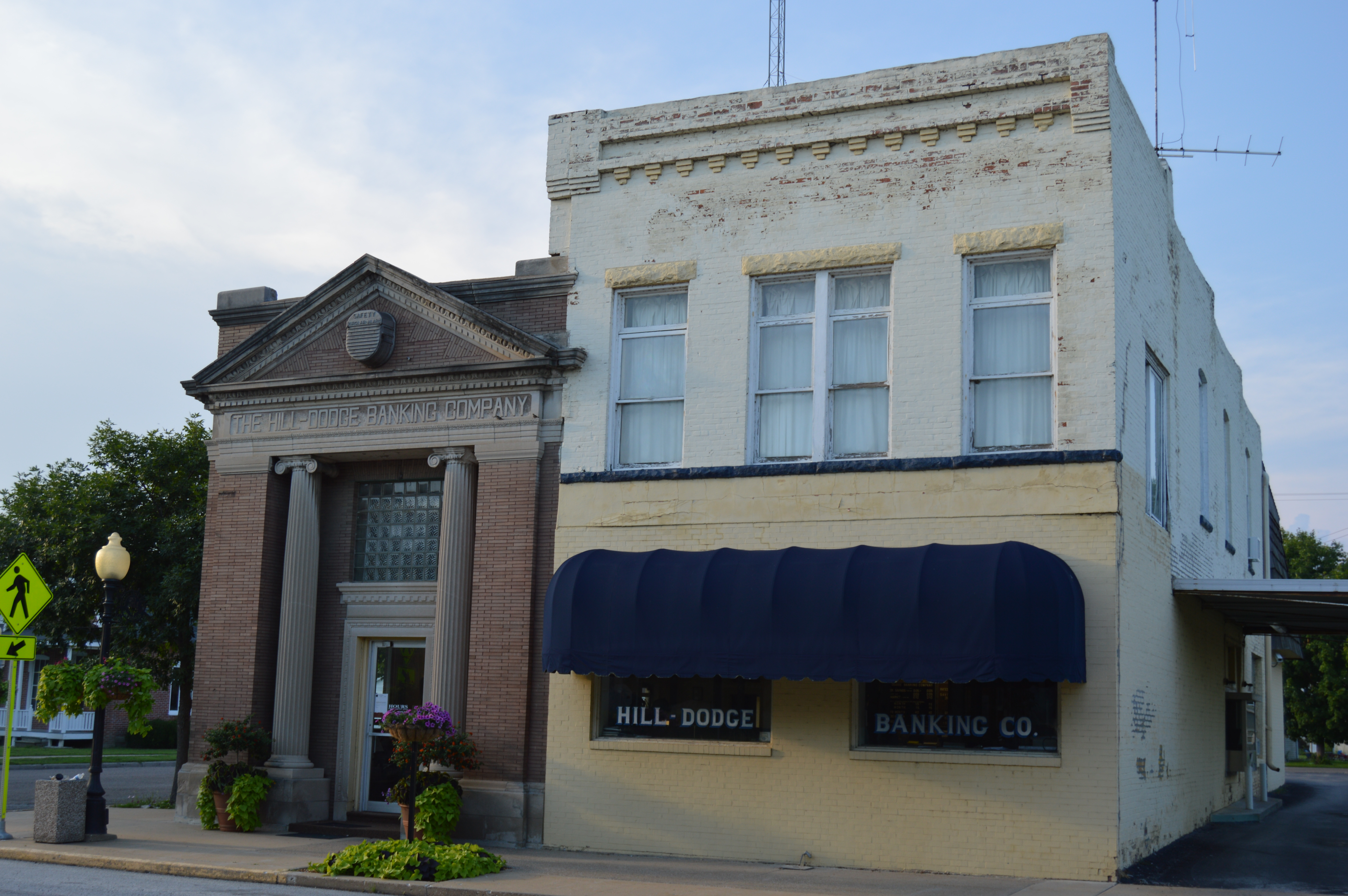
- Hill-Dodge Banking Company

- Location within Illinois Location within the United States
- Location: Roughly bounded by the Mississippi River, Marion and 11th Sts., Warsaw, Illinois
- Coordinates: 40°21′48″N 91°26′7″W
- Area: 265 acres (107 ha)
- Architectural style: Greek Revival, Italianate, Federal
- NRHP reference No.: 77000486
- Added to NRHP: December 16, 1977

The Warsaw Historic District is a historic district encompassing the inner core of Warsaw, Hancock County, Illinois. As the city has lost many of its outlying residential areas, the district includes nearly all of the town's developed area, which has been relatively unchanged since the late 19th century. The city was settled in the 1810s and 1820s as a military outpost on the Mississippi River and was platted in 1833. As an economically significant port city, the town grew steadily until the 1870s, reaching a peak population of 5,000 to 15,000 people; it has declined since and now has less than 2,000 residents. The town's historic buildings include a commercial core along Main Street and low-density residential areas in the rest of the district. The Greek Revival, Federal, and Italianate architectural styles are all well-represented among the district's buildings.

The district was added to the National Register of Historic Places on December 16, 1977.
