= Poormaster =

American job position

Poormaster is the name of a now obsolete job position similar to that of paymaster. Most of the states in the early United States had their own poormaster.

The duties of a poormaster were to validate those who applied for relief and issue funds. The job was often a political sinecure before the 1930s. However the job was not without its risks. Those rejected often held grudges, and poormasters were sometimes guarded by police officers during the Great Depression.

Harry L Barck was one such. He held the position of Poormaster for the city of Hoboken, New Jersey. He was killed by Joseph Scutellaro, a frustrated applicant, on February 15, 1938. Scutellaro, who killed Barck with a spindle, received two years in prison.

The occupation ceased to exist after the 1940s, with the advent of social assistance.

== Works ==
- Historian Holly Metz has received a grant to write a book on Barck , to be titled Killing the Poormaster.
- Livermore, Mary (1888). "Chapter 31". My Story of the War. Hartford, Conn.: A.D. Worthington and Company.
- Killing the poormaster : a saga of poverty, corruption, and murder in the Great Depression (book) https://lccn.loc.gov/2012021790
