= St. Luke's Church =

St. Luke's Church may refer to:

== Australia ==
- St Luke's Church, Adelaide, South Australia
- St Luke's Church of England, Brisbane, Queensland
- St Luke's Anglican Church, Boyne Island, Queensland
- St Luke's Anglican Church, Toowoomba, Queensland
- St Luke's Anglican Church, Liverpool, New South Wales

== Canada ==
- St. Luke's Anglican Church in Winterton, Newfoundland and Labrador
- Saint Luke's United Church in Toronto, Ontario, Canada

== Denmark ==
- St. Luke's Church, Aarhus
- St. Luke's Church, Copenhagen

== Germany ==
- St. Luke's Church, Munich
- St. Lukas, Schweinfurt

== India ==
- St Luke's Church, Patna, Bihar
- St. Luke's Church, Srinagar, Jammu and Kashmir

== Iran ==
- St. Luke's Church, Isfahan

== Ireland ==
- St. Luke's Church, Dublin

== Malta ==
- St Luke's Garrison Chapel
- St Luke's Chapel, Żurrieq

== New Zealand ==
- St Luke's Church, Christchurch

== Pakistan ==
- St. Luke's Church, Abbottabad

== Romania ==
- St. Luke's Church, Sibiu

== Sri Lanka ==
- St Luke's Church, Borella, Sri Lanka
- St. Luke's Church, Piliyandala

== United Kingdom ==
=== England ===
- St Luke the Evangelist Church, Brierfield, Lancashire
- St Luke's Church, Brislington, Bristol
- St Luke's Church, Bristol Street, Birmingham
- St Luke's Church, Charlton
- St Luke's Church, Chelsea, London
- St Luke's Church, Derby
- St Luke's Church, Doseley, Shropshire
- St Luke's Church, Dunham on the Hill, Cheshire
- St Luke's Church, Endon, Staffordshire
- St Luke's Church, Farnworth, Widnes, Cheshire
- St Luke's Church, Formby, Merseyside
- St Luke's Church, Goostrey, Cheshire
- St Luke's Church, Great Crosby, Merseyside
- Church of St Luke, Heywood, Greater Manchester
- St Luke's Church, Hodnet, Shropshire
- St Luke's Church, Holmes Chapel, Cheshire
- St Luke's Church, Ilford, London
- St Luke Old Street, Islington, London, a deconsecrated church now used by the London Symphony Orchestra as a music centre
- St Luke's Church, Kentish Town, London
- St Luke's Church, Kew, London
- St Luke's Church, Kingston upon Thames, London
- Church of St Luke, Liverpool
- St Luke's Church, Lower Whitley, Cheshire
- St Luke's Church, Matfield, Kent
- St Luke's Church, Oakhanger, Cheshire
- St Luke's Church, Orrell, Greater Manchester
- St Luke's Church, Pendleton, Greater Manchester
- St Luke's Church, Preston, Lancashire
- St Luke's Church, Queen's Park, Brighton
- St Luke's Church, Redcliffe Gardens, London
- St Luke's Church, Silverdale, Staffordshire
- St Luke's United Reformed Church, Silverhill, Hastings
- St Luke's Church, Skerton, Lancashire
- St Luke's Church, Slyne with Hest, Lancashire
- St Luke's Church, Torver, Cumbria
- Church of St Paul with St Luke, Tranmere, Merseyside
- St Luke's Church, Walton, Liverpool
- St Luke's Church, West Norwood, London, one of the Lambeth Waterloo churches
- St Luke's Church, Winmarleigh, Lancashire
- St Luke's Church, Winton, Dorset

=== Scotland ===
- St Luke's Orthodox Cathedral, Glasgow, Scotland
- St Luke's Church, Broughty Ferry

== United States ==
- St. Luke's Catholic Church (Warren, Arkansas), listed on the NRHP
- St. Luke's Church, Seaford (Sussex County, Delaware)
- St. Luke's Church (Blue Ridge, Georgia)
- St. Luke's United Methodist Church (Dubuque, Iowa), listed on the NRHP
- St. Luke's Episcopal Church (Fort Madison, Iowa), listed on the NRHP
- St. Luke's Methodist Church (Monticello, Iowa), listed on the NRHP
- St. Luke's Church (Baltimore, Maryland), listed on the NRHP
- St. Luke's Church (Church Hill, Maryland), listed on the NRHP
- St. Luke's and St. Margaret's Church (Boston, Massachusetts), listed on the NRHP
- St. Luke's Church (Clermont, New York), listed on the NRHP
- Church of St. Luke in the Fields, Greenwich Village, New York City
- St. Luke's Episcopal Church (Katonah, New York), listed on the NRHP
- St. Luke's Church and Cemetery (Lincolnton, North Carolina), listed on the NRHP
- St. Luke's Anglican Church (Georgetown, Pennsylvania)
- St. Luke's Church (Pritchardville, South Carolina), listed on the NRHP
- St. Luke's Church (Smithfield, Virginia), a National Historic Landmark and listed on the NRHP
- St. Luke's Episcopal Church (Vancouver, Washington)
- Saint Luke's Church Complex (Two Rivers, Wisconsin), listed on the NRHP
- St. Luke's Church (Bronx)

== See also ==
- Cathedral of St. Luke (disambiguation)
- Christ and St. Luke's Church, Norfolk, Virginia
- St. Luke's Episcopal Church (disambiguation)
- St. Luke's Protestant Episcopal Church (disambiguation)
- St. Luke's Methodist Episcopal Church (disambiguation)
- St. Luke's Chapel (disambiguation)
- St. Luke's Hospital (disambiguation)
