= St. Luke's Episcopal Church =

St. Luke's Episcopal Church or Old St. Luke's Episcopal Church may refer to:

== United States ==
(by state then city)

- St. Luke's Episcopal Church (Cahaba, Alabama), formerly located in Browns, Alabama, listed on the National Register of Historic Places (NRHP) in Dallas County, Alabama
- St. Luke's Episcopal Church (Hot Springs, Arkansas), listed on the NRHP in Garland County, Arkansas
- St. Luke's Epuscopal Church (Auburn, California), founded 1887 in Auburn, California
- St. Luke's Episcopal Church (Palm Beach, California), listed on the Long Beach historic landmarks
- St. Luke's Episcopal Church (Denver, Colorado), a Denver Landmark
- St. Luke's Episcopal Church (New Haven, Connecticut), listed on the NRHP in New Haven County, Connecticut
- St. Luke's Episcopal Church and Cemetery (Courtenay, Florida), listed on the NRHP in Brevard County, Florida
- St. Luke's Episcopal Church (Atlanta)
- St. Luke's Episcopal Church (Weiser, Idaho), listed on the NRHP in Washington County, Idaho
- St. Luke's Episcopal Church (Cannelton, Indiana), listed on the NRHP in Perry County, Indiana
- St. Luke's Episcopal Church (Fort Madison, Iowa), NRHP-listed
- St. Luke's Episcopal Church (Anchorage, Kentucky), listed on the NRHP in Jefferson County, Kentucky
- St. Luke's Episcopal Church (Lanesborough, Massachusetts), listed on the NRHP in Berkshire County, Massachusetts
- St. Luke's Episcopal Church (Hastings, Minnesota)
- St. Luke's Episcopal Church (Hope, New Jersey), listed on the NRHP in Warren County, New Jersey
- St. Luke's Episcopal Church (Beacon, New York), listed on the NRHP in Dutchess County, New York
- St. Luke's Episcopal Church (Brockport, New York), listed on the NRHP in Monroe County, New York
- St. Luke's Episcopal Church (Queens), listed on the NRHP in Queens County, New York
- St. Luke's Episcopal Church (Jerusalem, New York), listed on the NRHP in Yates County, New York
- St. Luke's Episcopal Church (Katonah, New York), listed on the NRHP in Westchester County, New York
- St. Luke's Episcopal Church (Asheville, North Carolina), listed on the NRHP in Buncombe County, North Carolina
- St. Luke's Episcopal Church (Eden, North Carolina), listed on the NRHP in Rockingham County, North Carolina
- St. Luke's Episcopal Church (Cincinnati, Ohio)
- Old St. Luke's Episcopal Church (Cincinnati, Ohio)
- St. Luke's Episcopal Church (Granville, Ohio), listed on the NRHP in Licking County, Ohio
- St. Luke's Episcopal Church (Georgetown, Pennsylvania)
- St. Luke's Episcopal Church (Lebanon, Pennsylvania)
- St. Luke's Episcopal Church (Cleveland, Tennessee), listed on the NRHP in Bradley County, Tennessee
- St. Luke's Episcopal Church (Jackson, Tennessee)
- Old St. Luke's Episcopal Church (Belton, Texas), listed on the NRHP in Bell County, Texas
- St. Luke's Episcopal Church (Park City, Utah), listed on the NRHP in Summit County, Utah
- St. Luke's Episcopal Church (Fine Creek Mills, Virginia), listed on the NRHP in Powhatan County, Virginia
- St. Luke's Episcopal Church (Washington, D.C.), listed on the NRHP in Washington, D.C.
- St. Luke's Episcopal Church (Vancouver, Washington)
- St. Luke's Episcopal Church, Chapel, Guildhall, and Rectory, Racine, WI, listed on the NRHP in Racine County, Wisconsin
- St. Luke's Episcopal Church (Buffalo, Wyoming), listed on the NRHP in Johnson County, Wyoming

== See also ==
- St. Luke's Evangelical Lutheran Church, listed on the NRHP in Manhattan, New York
- St. Luke's United Methodist Church (Dubuque, Iowa), listed on the NRHP in Dubuque County, Iowa
- St. Luke's Protestant Episcopal Church (Seaford, Delaware), listed on the NRHP in Sussex County, Delaware
- St. Luke's Protestant Episcopal Church (Brooklyn, New York), listed on the NRHP in Kings County, New York
- St. Luke's Church (disambiguation)
