= St. Luke's Protestant Episcopal Church =

St. Luke's Protestant Episcopal Church may refer to:

- St. Luke's Protestant Episcopal Church (Sea Cliff, New York), a historic church in New York
- St. Luke's Protestant Episcopal Church (Seaford, Delaware), a historic church in Delaware
- St. Luke's Protestant Episcopal Church (Brooklyn, New York), also known as Church of St. Luke and St. Matthew, a historic church in New York
- Saint Luke's Protestant Episcopal Church (Kearney, Nebraska)

== See also ==
- St. Luke's Episcopal Church (disambiguation)
- St. Luke's Church (disambiguation)
