= St. Luke's Methodist Church =

St. Luke's Methodist Church or St. Luke's United Methodist Church may refer to:

- St. Luke's Methodist Church (Monticello, Iowa), NRHP-listed, known also as St. Luke's United Methodist Church, in Jones County
- St. Luke's United Methodist Church (Dubuque, Iowa), NRHP-listed, in Dubuque County
