= St. Joseph's Church Complex (Fort Madison, Iowa) =

- St. Joseph's Church, Rectory, Chapel, Convent, and School
- U.S. National Register of Historic Places
- U.S. Historic district – Contributing property
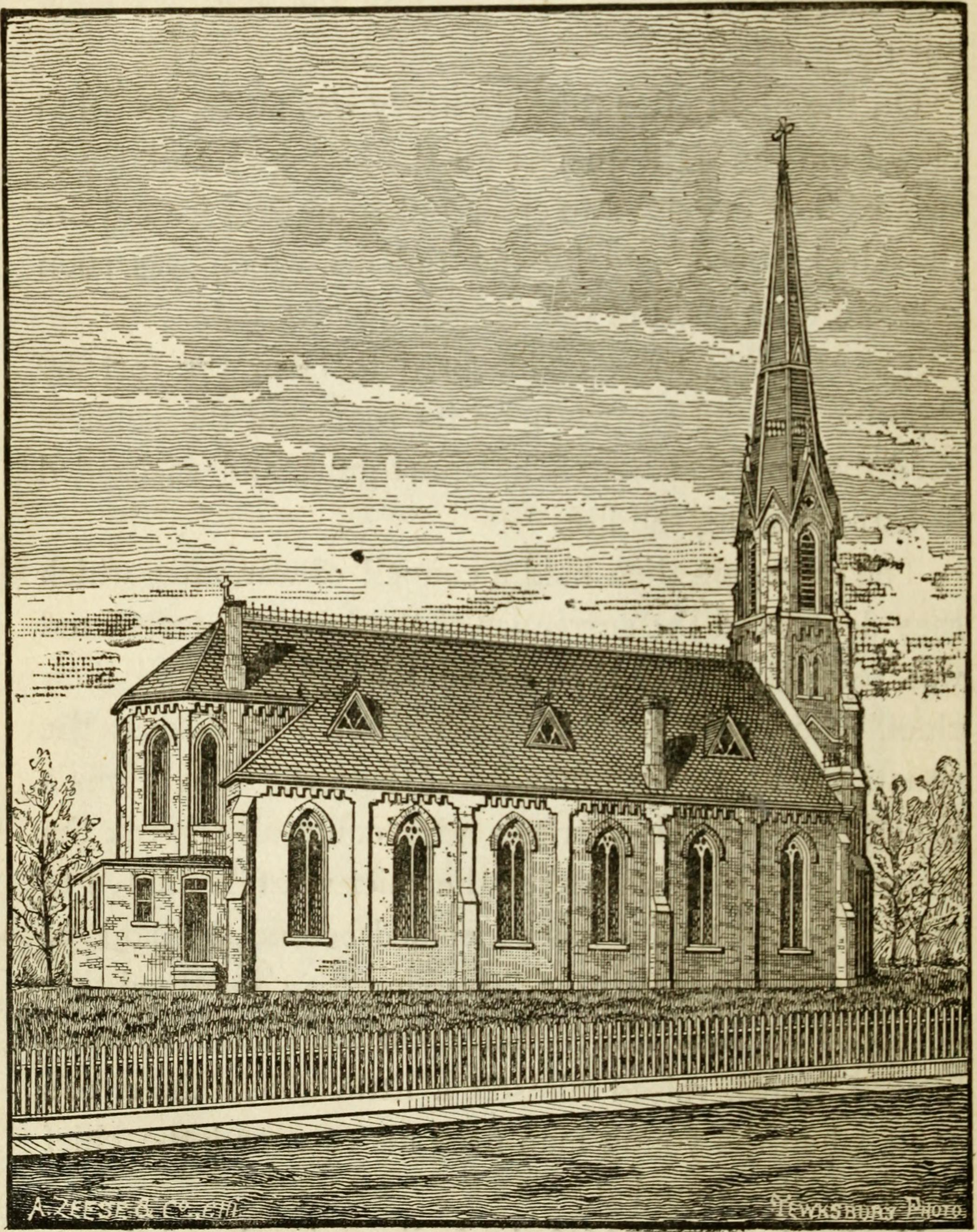
- Drawing of the church from 1886.

- Location within Iowa Location within the United States
- Location: 601 5th Street, 508, 509, 516, 520 Avenue F, Fort Madison, Iowa
- Coordinates: 40°37′54.03″N 91°18′24.2″W
- Built: 1850s (rectory); 1886 (church); 1890 (convent); 1914 (chapel); 1926 (school)
- Architect: Arthur Ebeling (school)
- Architectural style: Gothic Revival (church); Greek Revival (rectory); Italianate (convent); Neoclassical (school)
- Part of: Park-to-Park Residential Historic District
- NRHP reference No.: 14001069
- Added to NRHP: December 22, 2014

The St. Joseph's Church Complex is a collection of historic buildings located in Fort Madison, Iowa, United States. At one time the complex housed a Catholic parish in the Diocese of Davenport. St. Joseph and St. Mary of the Assumption parishes merged in the 1990s to form Saints Mary and Joseph Parish. In 2007 when that parish merged with Sacred Heart on the west side to form Holy Family Parish, St. Joseph's Church was closed. The former church, chapel, rectory, convent, and school were included as contributing properties in the Park-to-Park Residential Historic District that was listed on the National Register of Historic Places in 2014.

== History ==
=== St. Joseph’s Church ===
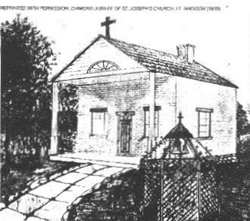
The original St. Joseph's Church (1840)

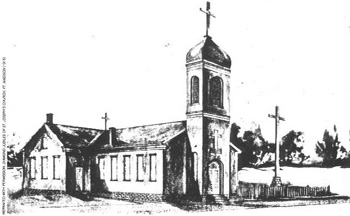
St. Joseph's 1847 church

The Catholic Church in Fort Madison was organized by a missionary priest to the Midwest named John George Alleman. Initially, he stayed in the home of John Gerhard Schwartz, where he also celebrated the first Mass in the town. Schwartz also offered his assistance in building the first Catholic church in the community. St. Joseph parish was organized in 1840 in what was then the Diocese of Dubuque. Besides John Schwartz, the first parishioners included his brother Henry Schwartz, Herman Dingman, Joseph Hellman, Henry Tieken, Bernard Tieken, Richard Fahey, Liborious Nelle, Henry Becker, and their families. Within six years their numbers had swelled to 75 families, and the small brick church the first families built became too small, so a new church was built in 1847. Father Alleman lived in a room in the basement of the church and, at the request of Bishop Mathias Loras, ministered to the German people of Southeastern Iowa, as well as the Illinois community of Nauvoo, Illinois.

Father Alleman also established the first parochial school at St. Joseph's and was its first teacher. The School Sisters of Notre Dame from St. Louis were the first sisters to teach in Fort Madison. They were replaced at St. Joseph by the Congregation of the Humility of Mary. The school grew to include elementary and secondary grades. The last church building for the parish, which still stands on the east side of downtown, was built in 1886.

=== St. Mary's and Sacred Heart ===
In 1857 St. Joseph's pastor, the Rev. Alexander Hattenberger planned for a larger and more centrally located church for his growing parish. However, the American Civil War shelved whatever plans were made. During the pastorate of the Rev. John B. Weikman property was purchased west of the downtown area in April 1865. In August of the same year ground was broken for a new school and then a new church. On September 3, 1865, a riot erupted among the parishioners prompted by those who were opposed to the move. The controversy lasted for eight years and resulted in numerous building delays. The new school building was dedicated on November 9, 1865, as Kreutz Erhohung Schule (Exultation of the Cross School). It was named for the day (September 14) that the School Sisters of Notre Dame came to Fort Madison from Milwaukee in 1860. The Rev. Jacob Orth became pastor the following year and construction on the new church preceded with the laying of the cornerstone for the present St. Mary's Church on July 18, 1866. Plans were made to move to the new parish facilities in late 1870, but Bishop John Hennessy of Dubuque refused to dedicate the new church until its debt of $7,000 was paid off. Father Orth decided to act on his own and dedicated the new church himself on January 1, 1871. He was replaced as pastor the following month by the Rev. Aloysius Meis. The parish fluctuated between being known as St. Joseph's, the German Catholic Church in recognition of the parish's many German parishioners, as well as other names. The confusion ended in January 1874 when St. Joseph's was given its own pastor at its original location. The new facility became a new parish and was placed under the patronage of St. Mary of the Assumption.

The third parish in Fort Madison was founded in the town's Santa Fe neighborhood near the Santa Fe Railroad yards on the west side of town. The Rev. Louis DeCailly from St. Joseph's opened a school in Ivo Dentz's tin shop at the corner of Santa Fe and Union Avenues (present-day Avenue L and 23rd Street) on September 8, 1892. The Sisters of Humility from St. Joseph were placed in charge. DeCailly would occasionally celebrate Mass for the people of the area. Sacred Heart Parish was established the following year with the Rev. Peter Hoffman as pastor.

=== Mergers ===
The first merger of the Catholic Community in Fort Madison happened in the parochial schools. Both St. Joseph's and St. Mary's high schools merged in 1925 to form Catholic Central High School in the St. Mary's building. Aquinas High School replaced it on the city's northwest side in 1959. The three parishes continued to operate their own grade schools until 1966 when St. Joseph's, St. Mary's, and Sacred Heart were consolidated to form St. Joseph's Middle School for 7th and 8th grade students, using the St. Joseph's building. St. Joseph's K-6 students were then sent to St. Mary's. Sacred Heart and St. Mary's continued to operate their own grade schools until 1977 when they were consolidated to form Aquinas East, which was at St. Joseph's, and Aquinas West at Sacred Heart. By the 1990s the Catholic Schools in Fort Madison and the Marquette Catholic Schools based in nearby West Point were both struggling. The two Catholic school systems merged and a new school named Holy Trinity opened in July 2005.

Demographics in the city of Fort Madison and the Diocese of Davenport began to change in the latter half of the 20th century. Fort Madison lost population and the religious habits of Catholics started to change. The diocese also experienced a decline in the number of priests. A plan to consolidate parishes in the diocese was developed under Bishop Gerald O’Keefe. St. Joseph's and St. Mary's merged in 1996 and used both parish names in the name of the new parish, Saints Mary and Joseph. In 2007 Saints Mary and Joseph merged with Sacred Heart and formed Holy Family Parish. Bishop Martin Amos celebrated the last Mass in St. Joseph's Church on November 17, 2007. The former church building is now a wedding chapel.

== Architecture ==
St. Joseph's Church was built in the Gothic Revival style in 1886. The central bell tower, capped with a spire, is original to the church. The entry vestibules and corner towers that flank it were added in 1906. The church was constructed of brick on a stone foundation. The lancet windows are filled with stained glass, as is the small rose window above the main entrance. There is another small rose window in the center of the church's apse. Paired lancet windows line the side walls of the church. The interior is divided into three naves by columns of the Corinthian order. A hipped roof with a gable front-end caps the structure.

To the west of the church is a small brick chapel. It is a reconstruction of the 1840 church on its original foundation. The structure was built around 1914. It features a front gable and the roof is composed of asphalt shingles.

The former rectory is located to the east of the church and faces Fifth Street. It is the only structure not built by the parish. The house was initially built for Dr. James H. Bacon, a physician, and his wife Sarah Coffman Bacon in the 1850s. The Bacon's owned the house until 1883 when it was bought by George and Natalie Schafer. He was a druggist and president of the George H. Schafer & Co. He also served as vice president and president of the American Pharmaceutical Association. St. Joseph's bought the house for its rectory around 1925 and it was used for that purpose until 1996. It is once again a private home. The two-story house was constructed of brick on a stone foundation in the Greek Revival style. The roof is a dual-pitched hipped roof with asphalt shingles. The house was remodeled in the 1950s at which time the two-car garage was built near the alley. The garage is a brick structure with a hipped roof, and it is also a contributing property in the historic district.

The former convent was built by the parish for its rectory in 1880. It served that purpose until around 1925 when it was converted into a convent for the Sisters of Humility who taught in the parish school. The house served as the convent until 1979. It is now a private residence. The two-story house is located to the west of the chapel on Avenue F. It was constructed of brick on a stone foundation in the Italianate style. A two-car garage was built around 2000 and it is connected to the house by a breezeway. The house features a hipped roof and the garage features a front gabled roof.

The former school building sits across Avenue F from the church. Designed by Davenport architect Arthur Ebeling, it is a two-story brick structure built on a raised basement. The foundation is composed of concrete. It has a flat roof. The Neoclassical style building was completed in 1926 and used as a school until 2006.
