= St. Luke's Chapel =

St. Luke's Chapel may refer to:

- St. Luke's Chapel (Sewanee), located on the campus of Sewanee: The University of the South in Sewanee, Tennessee
- St. Luke's Chapel (Stamford, Connecticut), listed on the NRHP in Connecticut
- St. Luke's Chapel (Rutherfordton, North Carolina), listed on the NRHP in North Carolina
- St. Luke's Chapel, Oulu, a church in Oulu, Finland.

== See also ==
- St. Luke's Church (disambiguation)
