= John George Alleman =

American priest (1804–1865)

Reverend John George Alleman, OP
- Church: Catholic Church

Orders
- Ordination: June 11, 1834 by John Baptist Purcell

Personal details
- Born: December 3, 1804 Attenschwiller, Alsace, France
- Died: July 14, 1865 (aged 61) St. Louis, Missouri, USA
- Buried: Calvary Cemetery

John George Alleman (December 3, 1804 – July 14, 1865) was a missionary Catholic priest who served in the states of Ohio, Iowa and Illinois. He served as a priest in the Dominican Order from 1834 to 1840, after which time he was expelled from the order. He then served as a secular priest in the Diocese of Dubuque from 1840 to 1851, and in the Diocese of Chicago from 1851 to 1863. During his hospitalization in St. Louis, Missouri, (1863–1865) he was accepted back into the Dominican Order.

== Biography ==
=== Early life and ministry ===
Details of Alleman's early life are sketchy. It is known that he was born at Attenschwiller, Alsace, France, on December 3, 1804. He immigrated with his family to Ohio as a child. In his formative years he became fluent in his native German, French, and then English. Little is known of his early education, but in 1832 he was studying for the priesthood at St. Rose Priory in Kentucky. He was ordained to the priesthood by Bishop John Baptist Purcell of Cincinnati on June 11, 1834.

Alleman is described as a large man who possessed great physical strength and a gregarious personality. The Midwest was being settled predominantly by German and Irish immigrants, while the Catholic clergy were predominantly French. As Alleman could speak German, French and English, he was able to speak to these different ethnic groups fluently. His goals were simple, "I am a poor Dominican Friar. I made a vow of poverty, and another to establish missions; with God's grace I will keep them both." His missionary work was all encompassing, and poverty was his without his seeking it. However, he constantly found himself in trouble with his superiors.

=== Order of Preachers ===
The date of Alleman's profession as a Dominican is not listed in any sources. The first mention of him in the community is in 1832 at St. Rose Priory, and then his ordination in 1834. As a Dominican, Alleman served parishes in Canton, Zanesville, and Somerset, Ohio. He was recalled to St. Rose so that his superiors could supervise him better. The reason for his recall is unknown, and his placement at St. Rose did not have the desired effect. He was expelled from the community in 1840 for unspecified reasons. His superior, the Rev. Nicholas Young, OP, does refer to his being "crazy" at times.

=== Diocese of Dubuque ===
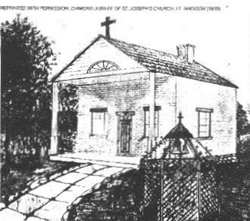
The original St. Joseph's Church in Fort Madison, Iowa, constructed under the leadership of Father Alleman.

Bishop Mathias Loras, the first bishop of Dubuque, was in need of priests who were fluent in German. Up to this point the few priests he had in the diocese were French, and one was Italian. His vicar general was a Dominican priest by the name of Samuel Charles Mazzuchelli, who may have been influential in bringing Alleman to Dubuque. It seems unlikely that Loras would have accepted a priest into the diocese, knowing the rigors that were required, who was expelled from his religious community and unfit for ministry. Mazzuchelli had his own run-in with Young, and was not living in community himself. In 1840 Alleman traveled down the Ohio River and up the Mississippi River to Dubuque, Iowa, where he spent a years time. He was assigned by Loras to serve the German Catholics of the Diocese and he made Fort Madison, Iowa, his base of operation. Until 1850 the Diocese of Dubuque included all of present-day Iowa, most of the state of Minnesota, and both North Dakota and South Dakota east of the Missouri River. Most of the German settlers were in the small towns in Iowa near the Mississippi River.

Fort Madison was a town in its formative years. It sat in an area that had been open to white settlers for only eight years. It contained a few brick buildings with most of the buildings described as wooden shanties. The Iowa Territorial Prison was on the eastern edge of town. The streets, which were impassable after a storm, were littered with livestock, both alive and dead. Drunkenness was rampant and violence was not uncommon. So why did he choose Fort Madison? Rev. John Larmer, a contemporary of Alleman's, said: "After looking over northeastern Missouri, and the adjacent portions of Illinois and Iowa, Father Alleman resolved to establish his permanent mission at Fort Madison, a beautiful site above the first rapids on the Upper Mississippi. His object in settling, so to speak, at this point, was to have a permanent 'shanty' in a central location, whence he could more effectively perform the great work, which his former experience as a missionary, told him lay before him."

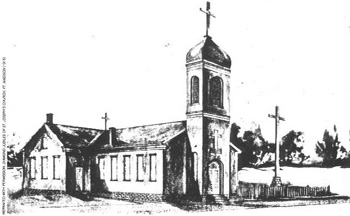
The second St. Joseph's Church in Fort Madison, Iowa, constructed under the leadership of Father Alleman in 1847.

In 1840 Alleman established St. Joseph Church with the assistance of the few Catholic residents of the city. He resided in the basement of the small church building. He took his meals in homes of parishioners or at a local boarding house. He started a school in the church building, where he would teach the children whenever he was in town. By 1847 the small church was replaced by a larger structure. He also planned to build a rectory and a school building, but they were never built in his time there. Alleman continued to live in the basement of the new church. It was not all work for the priest; he also enjoyed gardening. He raised flowers, fruits and vegetables in his garden. He was credited with breeding the "Alleman Rose".

Fort Madison was only his home base, however. During his years there he served missions in Sugar Creek (now known as St. Paul), West Point, Montrose, Burlington, Iowa City, St. Vincent's Church in a rural area west of Riverside, Keokuk, Augusta, Dodgeville, Bakers' Point, Farmington, Primrose, and Franklin, all in Iowa, and Nauvoo, Illinois. His name also appears in the baptismal registers of parishes in Sherrill and New Vienna, both of which are near Dubuque. At times, some of these parishes would have their own priest who would stay for a while and then leave, and Alleman would have to take over administration of the parish again. By 1851, however, Alleman was reduced to serving only Fort Madison with the other parishes being served by other priests.

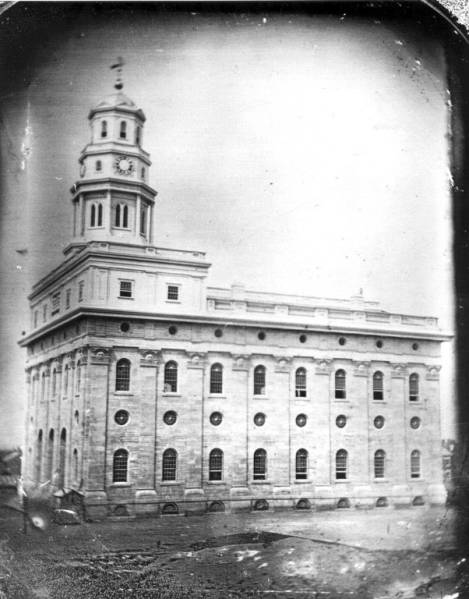
The original Mormon Temple in Nauvoo, Illinois, which Alleman was granted access to in order to perform his own religious responsibilities.

One of the people Father Alleman struck up a friendship with was the leader of the Church of Jesus Christ of Latter Day Saints, Joseph Smith. Between 1840 and 1843 Nauvoo grew quickly to become a community of 20,000 people. Many people on the Iowa side of the river feared the Mormons because they controlled the ferries that crossed the river (there were no bridges across the Mississippi yet), and they were rumored to accept outlaws from other parts of the country into their community. Alleman cultivated a friendship with Smith. Smith on his own part respected Alleman's leadership and linguistic abilities. He used the priest as a German and French translator. Alleman was granted access to Smith's barge to cross the river, and space in the Mormon Temple where he and other priests could baptize their own people. The Mormon's would also bring Alleman to a sick parishioner once they helped him cross the river. A Mormon building was used for Mass, and rock was quarried from the Mormon quarries for the second St. Joseph Church. Joseph Smith at one time told Alleman that next to the Latter Day Saints, Catholicism was the best religion. "For the priests attend to their people faithfully and mind their own business, whereas the other preachers are continually bothering the Latter Day Saints." Father Alleman responded with thanks, saying "There was a diversity of opinion on that subject."

Bishop Loras was the son of a wealthy mercantile family, and he tended to run his diocese as though it was a business. While Loras would provide the initial funds to start a parish it was up to the parish and its pastor to become financially stable on their own as soon as possible. If the parish borrowed money to build the church, Loras held the pastor responsible for the debt. Finances were not one of Alleman's strong points, and the bishop had little or no confidence in Alleman's abilities. In 1847 Alleman fell into debt with construction projects at both Fort Madison and West Point. Loras recalled Alleman to Dubuque and left Lee County without a priest. Alleman was assigned to an Irish parish in Garryowen until the parishes paid their debts and promised to financially support their priest. At this time Alleman attempted to sue the Dominicans for payment for the six years he served as a priest while in the community. Loras had him withdraw his lawsuit. He was also involved in a controversy to close the church at Sugar Creek and have the parishioners attend the parish at West Point.

=== Diocese of Chicago ===
By 1851 Father Alleman was serving only St. Joseph's in Fort Madison. There appears to be little in the official records that tells us the reason for his leaving the Dubuque Diocese. However, Alleman was far from being the only priest to leave the diocese during the episcopate of Bishop Loras. He also saw himself as not belonging to a single place, but as a missionary and he was invited to serve in a new mission territory. One source said that he was invited by Chicago's first bishop, William Quarter. Quarter died before he moved, and Alleman is quoted as saying, "I told Bishop Van de Velde of Chicago (Quarter's successor) that I would help him in Rock Island. He has promised to secure a German speaking priest for that area, and a new field of work will be a challenge. …I do not mind leaving Fort Madison. St. Joseph's is really developing with about 18,000 people. With the grace of God, Catholicity will grow and flourish. Illinois calls, so I must go."

In May 1851 Alleman arrived in Rock Island, a town in western Illinois on the Mississippi River. There he established its first Catholic Church, St. James (now St. Mary's Church). He would visit the Rock Island Arsenal once or twice a week and he would send food to the sick soldiers he had made friends with on the island. The cornerstone for the new church was laid in August 1851 and it took two years to build the church. He also built a school and rectory there. Records show that in 1851 there were 18 baptisms and four marriages at St. James. By 1856 the numbers swelled to 169 baptisms and 54 marriages. That year he received the Rev. John Donelson as his assistant. In 1857 the first Catholic Church in Moline, named St. Anthony's, was established. He also organized churches in East Moline, Hampton, Coal Valley, Rapid City, and Edgington, and was responsible for the church in Nauvoo and its mission in Warsaw. He spent most of his first year assigned to Rock Island in Nauvoo, where he appears to have spent the winter of 1852. He traveled regularly to Fort Madison.

=== Later life and death ===
The heavy work load and constant traveling eventually took its toll on Alleman's health. Toward the end of his time in Rock Island he was described as "a very peculiar man" who "lived a very secluded life and lived much to himself," which was not in character with the gregarious man of his younger days. He was assigned to the pastorate in Collinsville in 1862, in the Diocese of Alton. Here he would be close to better healthcare facilities in St. Louis.

Both his physical and mental condition grew worse and in 1863 he was admitted to St. Vincent's Sanatorium in St. Louis. He was diagnosed as having melancholia, now referred to as depression. Toward the end of his life he was received back into the Dominican Order. When he heard the news, he responded, "The special vocation of the Dominicans is teaching and defending the truths of the faith. They preach devotion to the Rosary. I have lived up to these ideals all my life. I was always a Dominican at heart."

Alleman died from apoplexy in the sanatorium on July 14, 1865, at the age of 60. He was buried in an unmarked grave in Calvary Cemetery in St. Louis.

== Legacy ==
Many Catholic parishes in the region credit their existence to the missionary labors of the priest. Those parishes formed the nucleus that would become in time the Diocese of Peoria in 1875 and the Diocese of Davenport in 1881. When Catholics in Rock Island County established a new central high school in 1949 they named it Alleman, in his memory.
