= Upper Main Street Historic District (Dubuque, Iowa) =

Historic district in Iowa, United States

- U.S. National Register of Historic Places
- U.S. Historic district
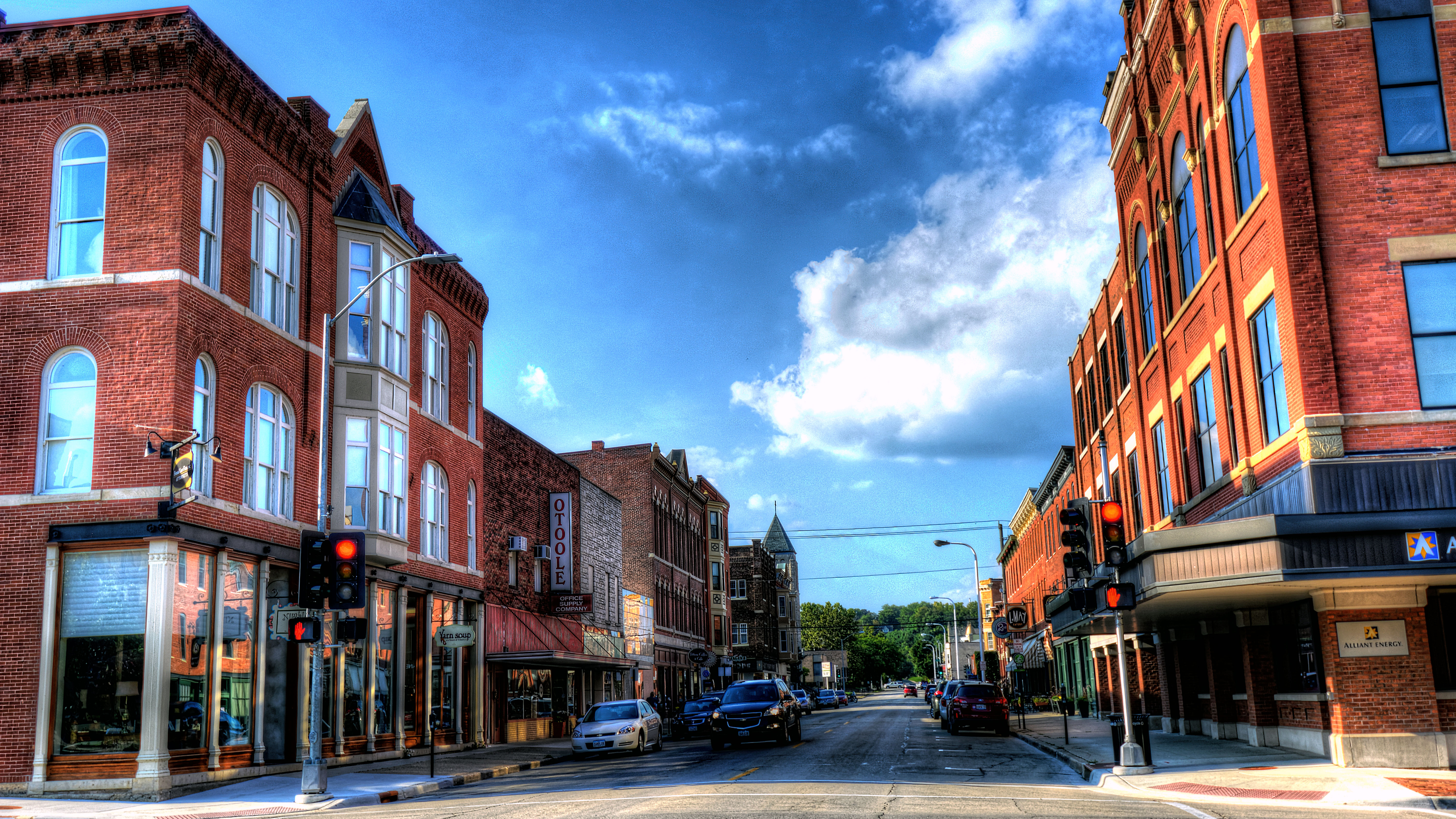
- 1000 Block of Main St.

- Location within Iowa Location within the United States
- Location: 909, 951, 955, 965, 1000 and 1100 blocks of Main St., Dubuque, Iowa
- Coordinates: 42°30′07″N 90°40′04″W
- Area: 4.2 acres (1.7 ha)
- Architect: Late Victorian; Bungalow/Craftsman; Beaux Arts
- MPS: Dubuque, Iowa MPS
- NRHP reference No.: 05000275 (original); 11000003 (increase)

Significant dates
- Added to NRHP: April 11, 2005
- Boundary increase: February 11, 2011

Upper Main Street Historic District is a nationally recognized historic district located in Dubuque, Iowa, United States. It was listed on the National Register of Historic Places in 2005. At the time of its nomination it consisted of 24 resources, which included 18 contributing buildings, and six non-contributing buildings. In 2011 the boundaries of the district were expanded to include four additional buildings on the west side of the 900 block of Main Street. The district is the northern end of the city's most important commercial street. It is situated on a level terrace above the downtown area, located to the east. The buildings located on the east side of Main Street have exposed foundations along the alley because the grade descends in that direction. For the most part the district is made up of commercial buildings, although there is one house, four rowhouses, and a church. All of the buildings are masonry construction, and they are between one and four stories tall. The bell tower of St. Luke's United Methodist Church (1896) is equivalent to an eight-story building. St. Luke's Church and the Interstate Power Company Building (1894, 1956) are individually listed on the National Register.
