= Park-to-Park Residential Historic District =

Historic district in Iowa, United States

- Park-to-Park Residential; Historic District
- U.S. National Register of Historic Places
- U.S. Historic district
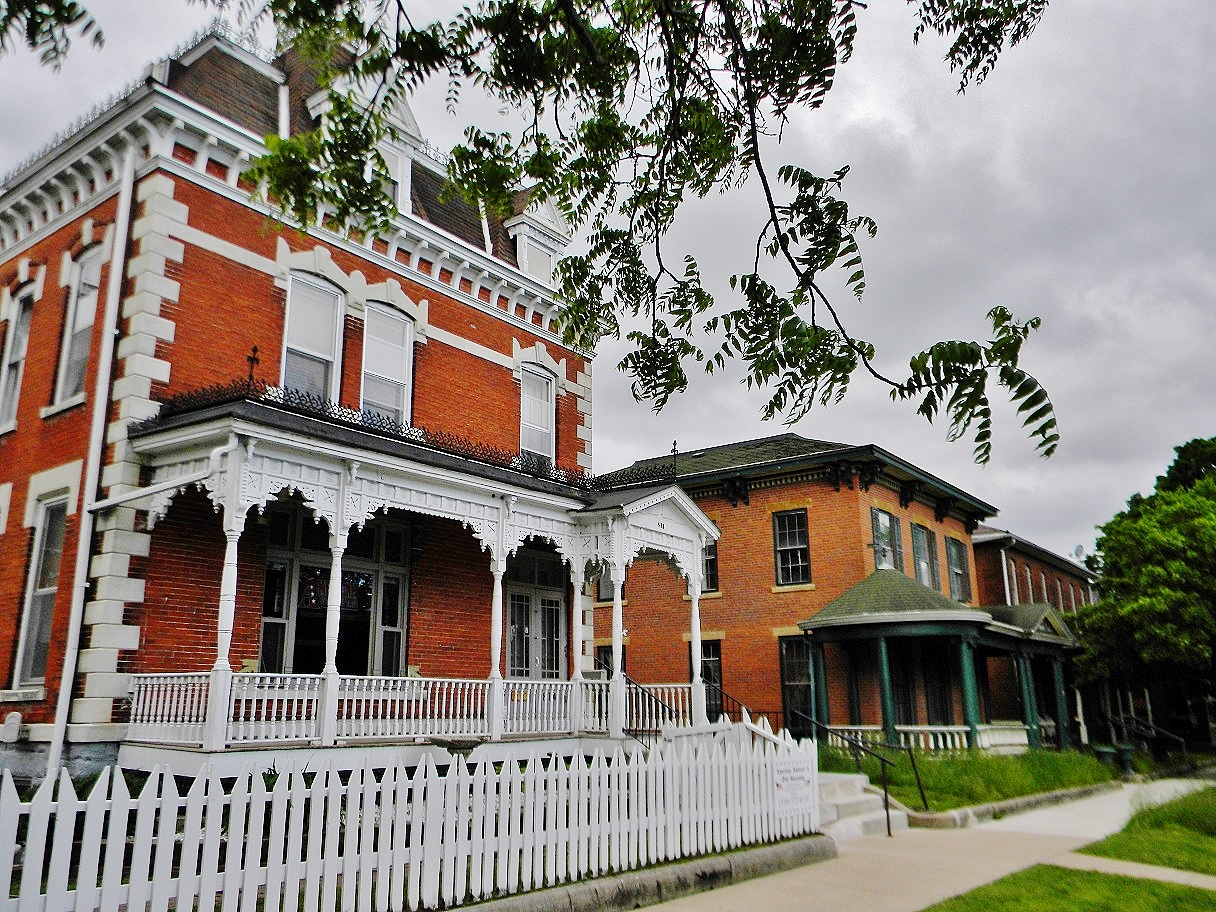

- Location within Iowa Location within the United States
- Location: 400-1100 blocks of Ave. F & 400-1100 blocks of Ave. E, Fort Madison, Iowa
- Coordinates: 40°37′58″N 91°18′35″W
- NRHP reference No.: 14001069
- Added to NRHP: December 22, 2014

The Park-to-Park Residential Historic District in Fort Madison, Iowa, United States, was listed on the National Register of Historic Places in 2014. The historic district is located to the north of the Downtown Commercial Historic District, generally between Central Park on the west and Old Settler's Park on the east. Both parks are contributing sites. For the most part the district is made up of single family homes built in the late 19th and early 20th centuries. Some of these homes were built as rental properties, while others became so in later years. The Albright House and the Chief Justice Joseph M. Beck House are contributing properties, and they are also individually listed on the National Register. There are also duplexes and a few small scale apartment buildings in the district.

The Historic Park to Park District is a seven-block-long, three block wide section of homes that represent the Gothic, Victorian, and Tudor era. With a rich variety of architectural styles like Gothic Revival, Italianate, Second Empire, Eastlake Stick, Richardson Romanesque, Queen Anne, and Tudor. With two of the six parks within the District. Given its location adjacent to the central business district there are no historic commercial buildings located in its boundaries. Institutions in the district include buildings erected by local governments and churches. The Lee County Courthouse (1842) and jail (c. 1850) are located across the street from the downtown area. A combination building houses the Fort Madison City Hall and a fire station (1873). The former St. Joseph's Catholic Church complex (various buildings from the 1850s to the 1920s) is located near Old Settler's Park, while St. Mary of the Assumption Catholic Church (1871), rectory (1876) and convent (1911) are located just west of Central Park. First United Methodist Church is associated with two sets of buildings in the district. Its original church built in 1888 now houses Joy Baptist Church. Their present church building was built in 1923. The present First Christian Church (1958) replaced an earlier church (1903) on the same property. Other denominations are represented by Union Presbyterian Church (1885) and Parsonage (c. 1890), St. John's Evangelical Church (1864) and Parsonage (1893), and St. Luke's Episcopal Church that was built as Hope Episcopal in 1857.
