= Old St. Luke's Episcopal Church (Cincinnati, Ohio) =

Coordinates: 39°06′57.7″N 84°31′46.6″W

St. Luke's Episcopal Church
- St. Luke's Episcopal Church
- Location: (United States) Cincinnati, Ohio, USA
- Denomination: Episcopal

History
- Founded: 1883
- Founder: The Rev. Lewis Brown

St. Luke's Episcopal Church, was located at Findlay & Baymiller Streets, in the Old West End Neighborhood of Cincinnati, Ohio. The church was founded in 1883 with the Rev. Lewis Brown as rector. The Rev. Ewald Haun was rector in 1911. In 1890, the parish had nearly 300 communicants. This was a member parish of the Episcopal Diocese of Southern Ohio.

Located just outside the Dayton Street Historic District, upon closing the church was merged with another parish in the Avondale neighborhood of Cincinnati. The name was then taken by the former Church of the Resurrection in the neighborhood of Sayler Park.
