= St. Luke's Church, Sibiu =

Heritage site in Sibiu County, Romania

Coordinates: 45°48′14″N 24°08′37″E

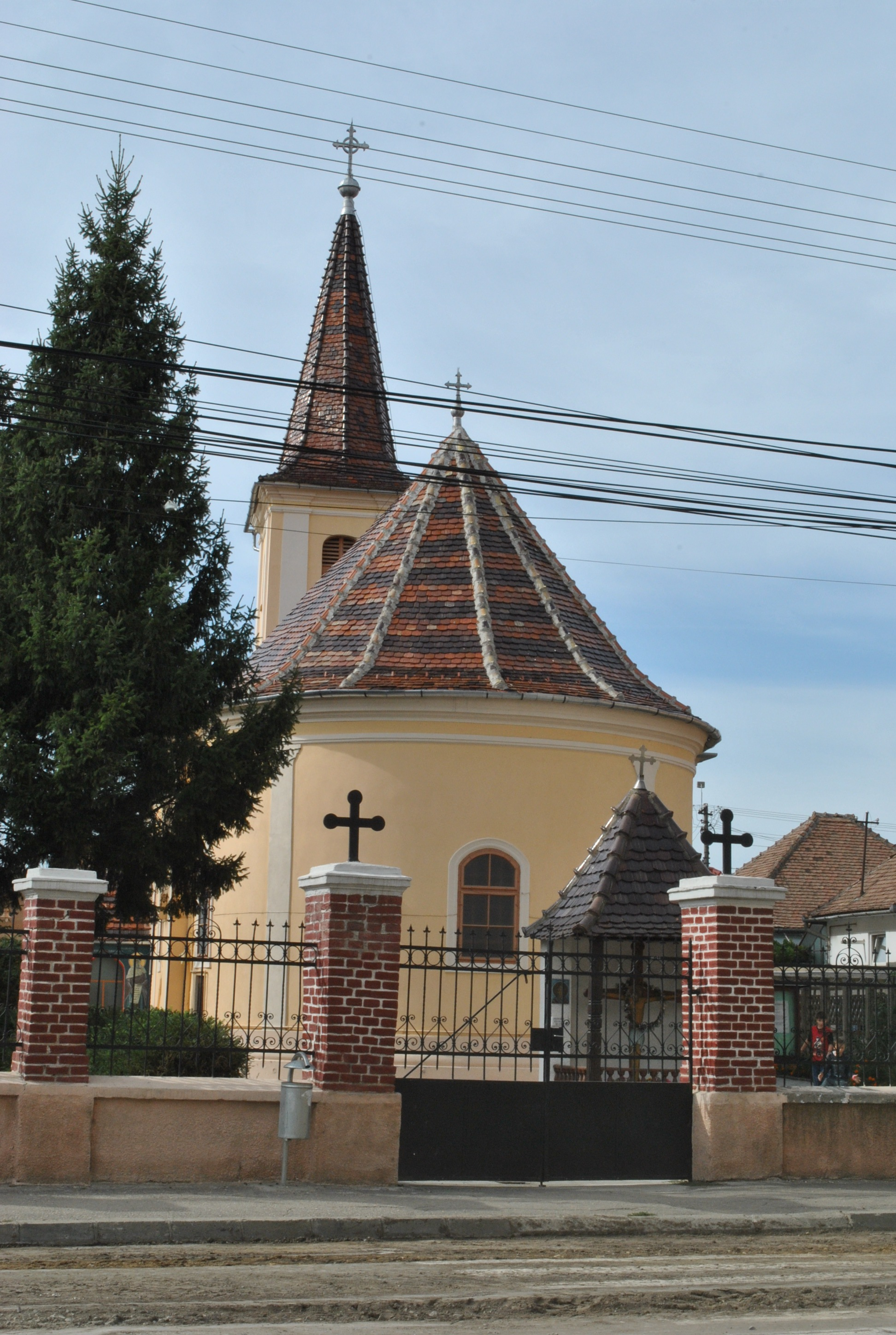
St. Luke's Church

St. Luke's Church (Romanian: Biserica Sfântul Luca) is a Romanian Orthodox church located at 25 Lungă Street, Sibiu, Romania. It is dedicated to Saint Luke.

== History ==
The church is located in what is now the Terezian district, earlier known as Maierii Sibiului (“servants of Sibiu”, referring to the Romanian community and its employment on the estates of the dominant Transylvanian Saxons). In 1782, as a result of the Patent of Toleration, three Romanian churches were approved for construction in Sibiu, one of these being St. Luke's.

Two successive Serbian bishops, who were then in charge of the Romanian Orthodox of Transylvania, played an important role in the building of the church, donating their private funds for the project. The first was Gideon Nikitić, who wished to have an unofficial residence in town, away from the village of Rășinari where he was obligated to have his see. After his death in 1788, his successor Gerasim Adamović continued the initiative, dedicating the new church in 1791. As the city's largest Orthodox church, it hosted ordinations and important events, becoming a de facto cathedral. When Gerasim died in 1796, he was buried before the royal doors, according to his wish.

In the mid-19th century, the Annunciation Church supplanted St. Luke's, which entered obscurity: the former was closer to the center, and boasted an elite Aromanian congregation. Around the same time, the St. Luke's congregation established a school, refurbished in 1901. It served as a kindergarten under the communist regime and, returned to the church after 1989, became a parish house.

== Description ==
Architecturally, the church is simple, with a rather large interior. Although it was built more slowly, it did not suffer major damage during the 1802 Vrancea earthquake, which destroyed the Church between the Fir trees. One special feature is a well-like hole dug into a corner during the original construction; it was used to throw in holy water after a baptism. In the 1980s it became clogged, but was dug out in 2010. Among the discoveries were 18th century shards and a cap, believed to be from a vase used to carry water from the baptismal font.

The balcony was painted in fresco by an unknown artist at the time the church was built. In 1972, the work was uncovered from a thick layer of plaster. It depicts scenes from Holy Week, in a style related to that of Wallachia. The soldiers who whip Jesus are shown in Ottoman, Austrian and Hungarian uniforms, a subtle form of protest at the Romanians’ condition. The painting is on two levels, divided by a stone inscription from 1791. Further painting occurred in 1923 and 1938, while the whole church, aside from the 18th century area, was repainted in 1965–1970. The parish owns a number of valuable objects, including the Romanian tricolor which Andrei Șaguna carried to Câmpia Libertății in Blaj during the 1848 revolution, among the oldest flags in the country.

The church is listed as a historic monument by Romania's Ministry of Culture and Religious Affairs.
