= Chief Justice Joseph M. Beck House =

Historic house in Iowa, United States

- U.S. National Register of Historic Places
- U.S. Historic district – Contributing property
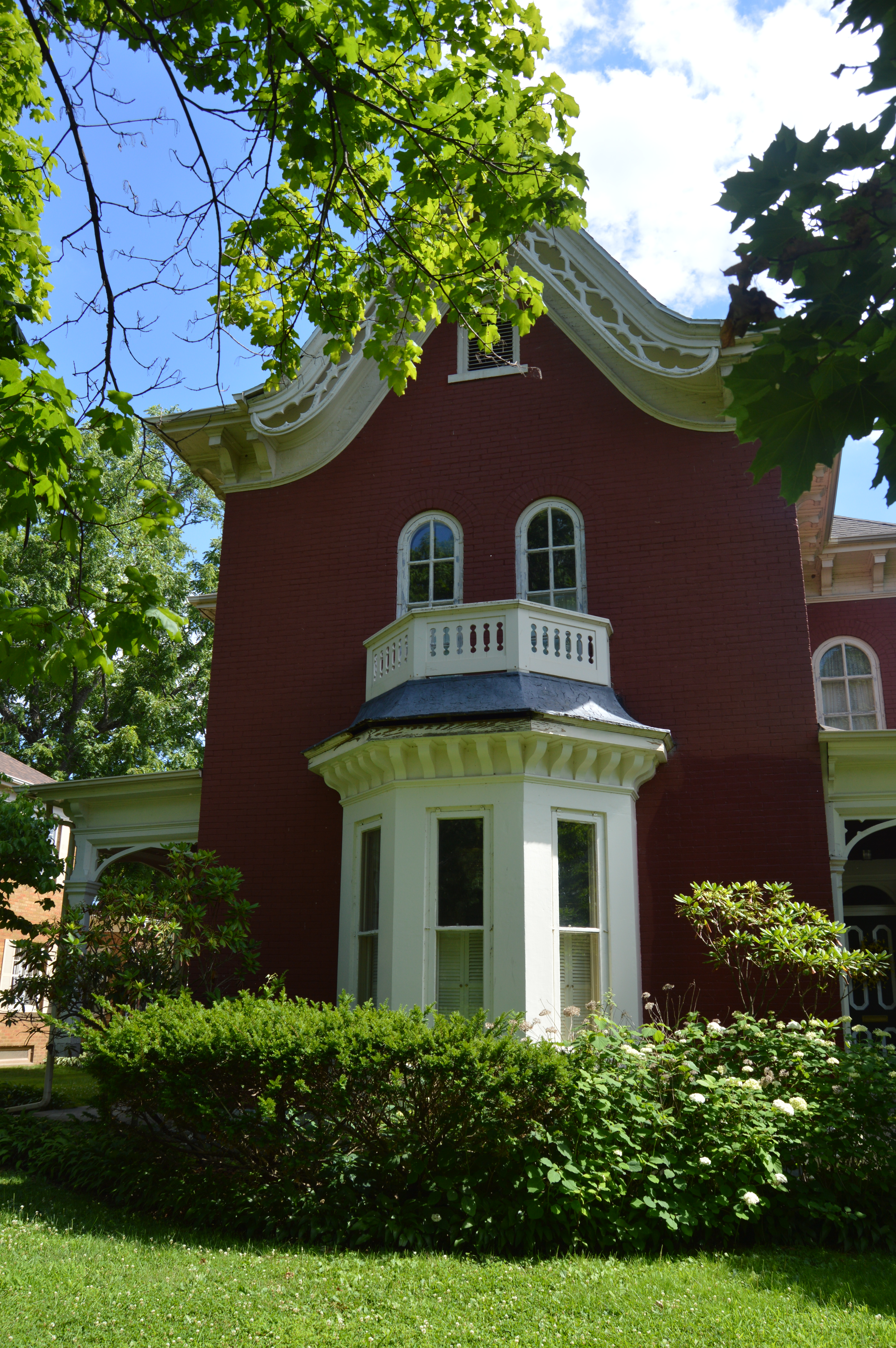

- Location within Iowa Location within the United States
- Location: 630 Ave. E Fort Madison, Iowa
- Coordinates: 40°37′58″N 91°18′34″W
- Area: Less than one acre
- Built: 1869
- Architectural style: Gothic Revival; Italianate; Romanesque Revival
- Part of: Park-to-Park Residential Historic District (ID14001069)
- NRHP reference No.: 88001116
- Added to NRHP: July 21, 1988

Chief Justice Joseph M. Beck House is a historic building located in Fort Madison, Iowa, United States. It was individually listed on the National Register of Historic Places in 1984. In 2014 it was included as a contributing property in the Park-to-Park Residential Historic District.

== History ==
Joseph M. Beck moved to Fort Madison in 1850. He was a locally prominent lawyer who was elected mayor and county attorney. In addition to the law, he was also involved in banking, railroad development, and organizing First Baptist Church. Initially a Whig, he helped establish the Republican Party. Beck served as a justice of the Iowa Supreme Court from 1868 to 1891. For five of those years he served as chief justice. On the court he was a supporter of civil rights for Blacks and the prohibition of alcohol.

== Architecture ==
The two-story brick house sits on a corner lot. The Beck family owned the property from 1859 to 1937 when it was sold to the Napier family. The house was built in 1869. The structure portrays the influences of the Gothic Revival, Italianate, and the Romanesque Revival styles. The first two are strongly invoked in the high pitch of the north facade's gable, the elaborate verge boards, and the bracketed eaves at the cornice. The round arch windows are from the Romanesque Revival style. The house is painted in the same red hue as its original surface.
