= Lee County Courthouse (Fort Madison, Iowa) =

- U.S. National Register of Historic Places
- U.S. Historic district – Contributing property
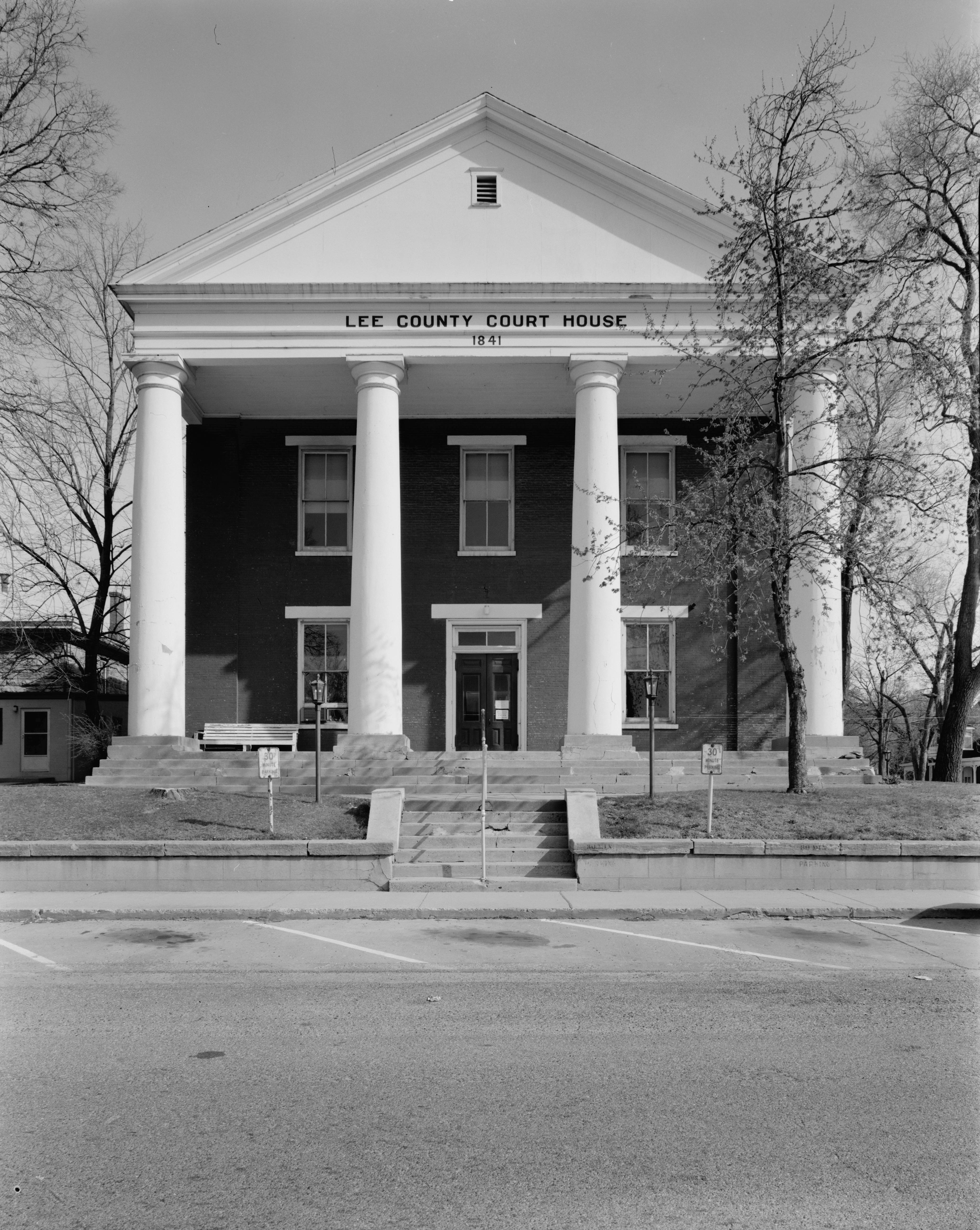

- Location within Iowa Location within the United States
- Location: 701 Ave. F Fort Madison, Iowa
- Coordinates: 40°37′55″N 91°18′36″W
- Area: less than one acre
- Built: 1842
- Architectural style: Greek Revival
- Part of: Park-to-Park Residential Historic District (ID14001069)
- MPS: County Courthouses in Iowa TR
- NRHP reference No.: 76000777
- Added to NRHP: September 30, 1976

The Lee County Courthouse is located in Fort Madison, Iowa, United States. The courthouse serves the court functions and county administration for the northern part of Lee County, and it is the county's first courthouse. It was listed on the National Register of Historic Places in 1976 as a part of the County Courthouses in Iowa Thematic Resource. In 2014, it was included as a contributing property in the Park-to-Park Residential Historic District. Southern Lee County is served from a courthouse in Keokuk in the former Federal Courthouse building.

== History ==
Construction began on the courthouse in 1841. The courthouse and the jail were completed the following year for about $12,000. The basement walls are constructed of stone and the upper walls are faced in brick. Four large Tuscan columns hold up the porch roof on the Greek Revival style building. After it was completed the seat of county government moved to West Point. From 1843 to 1845 the Fort Madison courthouse was rented out. County voters chose Fort Madison as the county seat in an election in 1845, and the courthouse has been used for county business since that time. The Iowa General Assembly established Keokuk as the second county seat in 1848, making Lee County the only Iowa county that has more than one courthouse. The Sullivan Line was used to divide the county into northern and southern sections. The Fort Madison courthouse was extensively remodeled in 1876 and included the construction of a cupola that was part of the building's original designs. It was lost in a fire in 1911, and not replaced when the building was renovated. Two additions were built onto the rear of the courthouse, probably during the above-mentioned renovations.

== See also ==
- National Register of Historic Places listings in Lee County, Iowa
