= Cathedral of St. Luke =

The Cathedral of St. Luke may refer to:

== United Kingdom ==
- Greek Orthodox Cathedral of St. Luke, Glasgow, Scotland

== United States ==
- Cathedral Church of St. Luke (Orlando, Florida)
- Cathedral Church of St. Luke (Portland, Maine)
- Cathedral of St. Luke and St. Paul (Charleston, South Carolina)

== See also ==
- St. Luke's Church (disambiguation)
