= Interstate Power Company Building =

- U.S. National Register of Historic Places
- U.S. Historic district – Contributing property
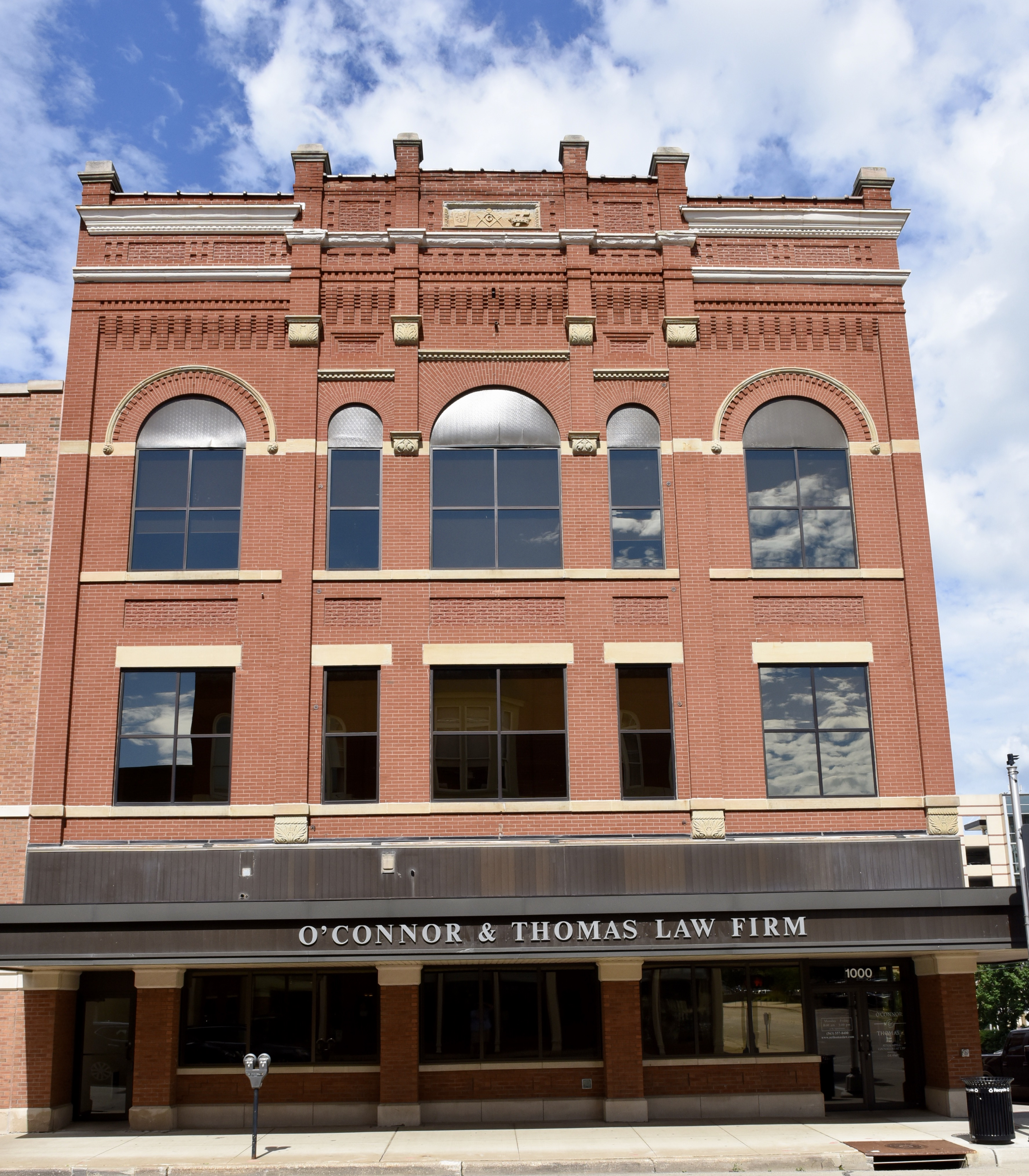

- Location within Iowa Location within the United States
- Location: 1000 Main and 131 W. 10th St., Dubuque, Iowa
- Coordinates: 42°30′09.7″N 90°40′04.3″W
- Area: less than one acre
- Built: 1894, 1956
- Architect: Thomas Carkeek; Durrant - Bergquist
- Architectural style: Queen Anne; Modern Movement
- Part of: Upper Main Street Historic District (ID86002102)
- MPS: Dubuque, Iowa MPS
- NRHP reference No.: 08000328
- Added to NRHP: June 26, 2008

The Interstate Power Company Building, also known as the Masonic Hall and the Dubuque Electric Company, is a historic building located in Dubuque, Iowa, United States. While a single facility, this is actually two buildings: an 1894 three-story Queen Anne, and a 1956 three-story (later four-story) Modern Movement free-standing addition. The Dubuque Electric Company moved into the older building in 1924, and the following year it was reorganized as Interstate Power Company. This became the headquarters of a regional electrical utility that, at one time, served parts of eight states and a Canadian province. The Great Depression and antitrust court rulings altered the company's fortunes. The 1956 addition was designed to hold the companies large computers in an air-conditioned environment, in addition to office space. Other additions to the building were made in 1962, 1981 and 1989. The facility remained Interstate's corporate headquarters until Alliant Energy bought and absorbed the company in 1996. Alliant continued to use the building for a period of time afterward. It was included as a contributing property in the Upper Main Street Historic District in 2005, and it was individually listed on the National Register of Historic Places in 2008.
