= Holy Family Catholic Church (Fort Madison, Iowa) =

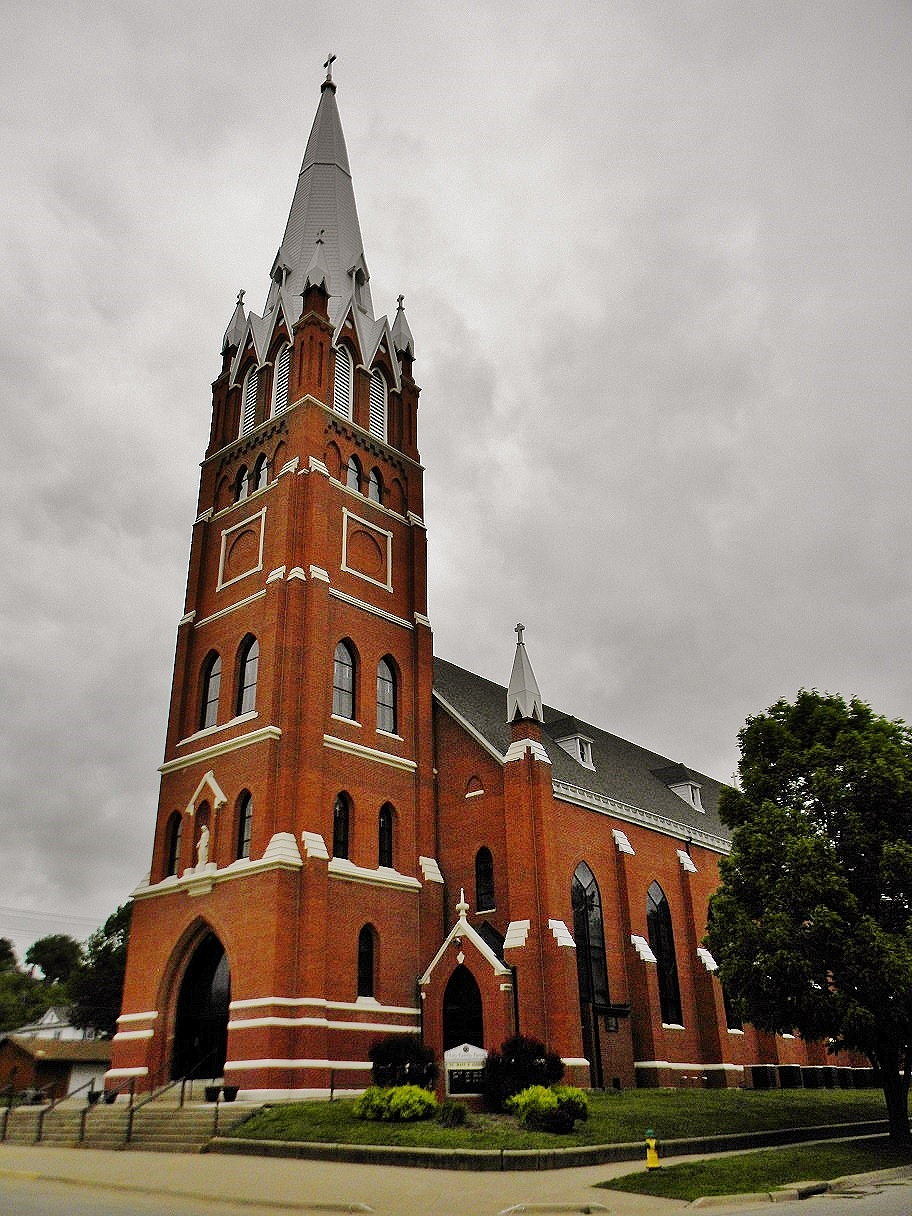
- St. Mary of the Assumption Church

- Location within Iowa
- 40°38′0″N 91°19′0″W
- Location: 1111 Avenue E Fort Madison, Iowa
- Country: United States
- Denomination: Roman Catholic
- Website: www.holyfamilyfm.com

Administration
- Diocese: Davenport

Clergy
- Bishop: Most Rev. Dennis G. Walsh
- Pastor(s): Rev. Gary Beckman
- St. Mary of the Assumption Church
- U.S. National Register of Historic Places
- U.S. Historic district – Contributing property
- Location: 1031 Ave. E Fort Madison, Iowa
- Built: 1871
- Architect: Walsh & Schmidt
- Architectural style: Gothic Revival
- Part of: Park-to-Park Residential Historic District (ID14001069)
- NRHP reference No.: 80001455
- Added to NRHP: February 8, 1980

Holy Family Catholic Church is a parish of the Diocese of Davenport. The parish is the result of a merger between Saints Mary and Joseph Parish and Sacred Heart Parish in the city of Fort Madison, Iowa, United States. It maintains both of the former parish church buildings as worship sites. The oldest parish in town, St. Joseph, and St. Mary of the Assumption had merged in the 1990s. St. Mary of the Assumption Church, which became Saints Mary and Joseph, is located at 11th Street and Avenue E. It was individually listed on the National Register of Historic Places in 1980. Sacred Heart Church is located at 23rd Street and Ave I.

In 2014 St. Mary's Church, rectory and convent were included as contributing properties in the Park-to-Park Residential Historic District on the National Register of Historic Places.

== History ==
=== St. Joseph’s Church ===
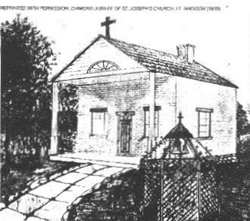
The original St. Joseph's Church (1840)

The Catholic Church in Fort Madison was organized by a missionary priest to the Midwest named John George Alleman. Initially, he stayed in the home of John Gerhard Schwartz, where he also celebrated the first Mass in the town. Schwartz also offered his assistance in building the first Catholic church in the community. St. Joseph parish was organized in 1840 in what was then the Diocese of Dubuque. Father Alleman also established the first parochial school at St. Joseph's and was its first teacher. The School Sisters of Notre Dame from St. Louis were the first sisters to teach in Fort Madison. They were replaced at St. Joseph by the Congregation of the Humility of Mary. The school grew to include elementary and secondary grades. The last church building for the parish, which still stands on the east side of downtown, was built in 1886. It was the smallest of the three Catholic Churches in town. Bishop Martin Amos celebrated the last Mass in the church on November 17, 2007.

=== St. Mary of the Assumption Church ===
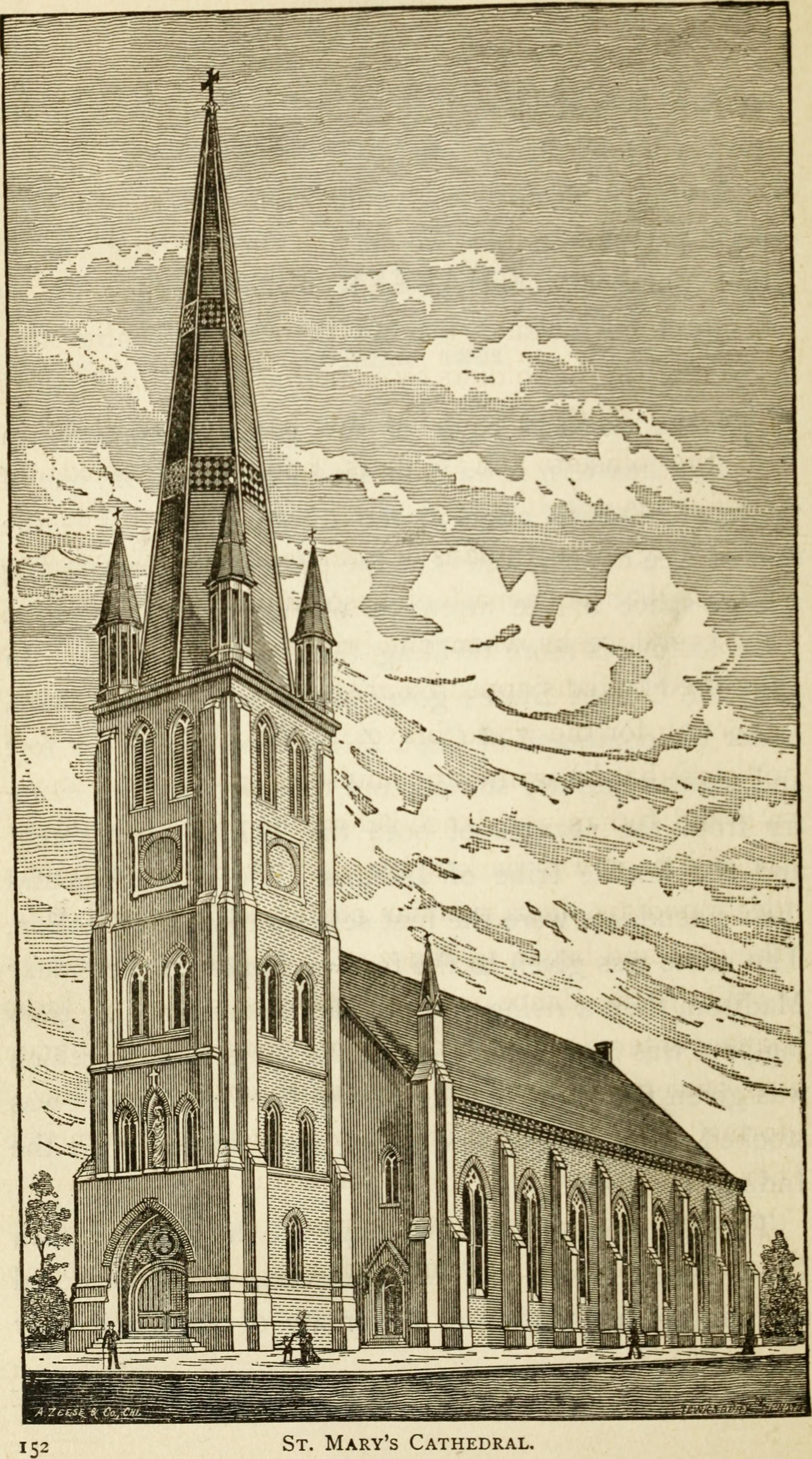
Drawing of St. Mary's church showing the original tower.

Fort Madison's second parish was established amidst controversy. In 1857 St. Joseph's pastor, the Rev. Alexander Hattenberger planned for a larger and more centrally located church for his growing parish. However, the Civil War shelved whatever plans were made. During the pastorate of the Rev. John B. Weikman property was purchased west of the downtown area in April 1865. In August of the same year ground was broken for a new school and then a new church. On September 3, 1865, a riot erupted among the parishioners prompted by those who were opposed to the move. The controversy lasted for eight years and resulted in numerous building delays. The new school building was dedicated on November 9, 1865 as Kreutz Erhohung Schule (Exultation of the Cross School). It was named for the day (September 14) that the School Sisters of Notre Dame came to Fort Madison from Milwaukee in 1860. The Rev. Jacob Orth became pastor the following year and construction on the new church preceded with the laying of the cornerstone for the present church structure on July 18, 1866. Plans were made to move to the new parish facilities in late 1870, but Bishop John Hennessy of Dubuque refused to dedicate the new church until its debt of $7,000 was paid off. Father Orth decided to act on his own and dedicated the new church himself on January 1, 1871. He was replaced as pastor the following month by the Rev. Aloysius Meis.

The parish fluctuated between being known as St. Joseph's, the German Catholic Church, in recognition of the parish's many German parishioners, as well as other names. The confusion ended in January 1874 when St. Joseph's was given its own pastor. The new parish was placed under the patronage of St. Mary of the Assumption. At its beginning St. Mary's had 1,000 parishioners and it doubled in size by 1887. There were 2,500 parishioners when the parish was divided to create Sacred Heart parish in 1893. German was used in the parish throughout the 19th century, but was replaced more and more by English in the early 20th century. Anti-German sentiment ended the practice with the onset of World War I.

The church building was designed by the St. Louis, Missouri architectural firm of Walsh & Schmidt. The cornerstone was laid on July 8, 1866. Work proceeded until late 1867 and did not resume until 1869 when the tower was finished. The building measures 172 feet (52 m) by 72 feet (22 m). A wooden spire was added to the tower in 1872, which gave it a height of 225 feet (69 m). The building was completed for $40,000 and by the time the spire was added and the interior was furnished it costs were placed at $100,000. The exterior of the church is composed of red brick with a large and tall central tower and spire. The interior has three naves and large wood carved altars in the far end of each nave that were installed in 1881. The tower collapsed into the main body of the church during a tornado, which struck Fort Madison on July 3, 1876. While the church and tower were quickly rebuilt it would be 14 years before a new spire was built. A new rectory was built in 1887. The architect for the new tower was Mathias Snell of Rock Island, Illinois. The new design was more elaborate and shorter than the original. It was completed for $7,000 and the 12-foot (3.7 m) tall cross rises 217 feet (66 m) above the ground. Colored glass windows were installed in 1892.

There was a pipe organ built by William Pilcher in the gallery when the tornado struck the church and it was destroyed. It was replaced in 1878 by a new organ built by John G. Pfeffer of St Louis for $4,500. It was damaged in a windstorm in 1890 when bricks and debris from the construction of the new spire crashed through the church roof. and it was completely overhauled in 1942 and again in the late 1980s. It 1986 it was recognized as the largest Pfeffer pipe organ in existence by the National Historical Organ Society.

The parish school had elementary grades from the beginning and it graduated its first high school class in 1922. The Sister's taught the lower grades and the older girls, while the older boys were taught by lay teachers. The first convent was a rented house from 1860 until a new convent was built in 1888. A larger school building was designed by Dubuque architect Martin Heer and it was built for $22,000 in 1899. It ceased being a school building in 1977 and it was struck by lightning and burned down shortly before it was scheduled to be torn down in 1979. The present convent was built in 1911 for $13,000.

From 1980 to 1984 the parish was served by priests from the Order of Friars Minor Conventual. In 1985 a new parish center was built on the location where the school building sat. It was built for $285,000.

=== Sacred Heart Church ===
The third parish in Fort Madison was founded in the town's Santa Fe neighborhood near the Santa Fe Railroad yards on the west side of town. The Rev. Louis DeCailly from St. Joseph's opened a school in Ivo Dentz's tin shop at the corner of Santa Fe and Union Avenues (present-day Avenue L and 23rd Street) on September 8, 1892. The Sisters of Humility from St. Joseph were placed in charge. DeCailly would occasionally celebrate Mass for the people of the area. Sacred Heart Parish was established the following year with the Rev. Peter Hoffman as pastor. It is the only one of the original three parishes that was founded in the Diocese of Davenport, which was created in 1881. At its beginning there were 65 families in the parish and 54 students in the school. On December 8, 1893, a combination church and school was dedicated at the corner of Union Avenue and Des Moines Street (23rd and I).

In 1897 Henry Heying donated $20,000 of land and $8,000 to build a new church. The cornerstone for the present church building was laid on April 16, 1899, and it was dedicated on October 15, 1900. The church was built in the Romanesque Revival style and it measures 145 feet (44 m) by 60 feet (18 m). The exterior is covered in Bedford stone. There is a corner tower and spire, and a statue of the Sacred Heart sits on the peak of the front gable of the facade. Three bells were added to the tower that weigh 7,000 pounds (3,175 kg), 5,500 pounds (2,495 kg) and 3,000 pounds (1,361 kg). The interior has three naves and the old altars were removed sometime after the Second Vatican Council. The church has a pipe organ in the gallery in the rear of the church.

Like the other two parishes in town, the parish supported its own school. Unlike the other two schools, Sacred Heart School held only elementary grades. From 1893-1983 the School Sisters of Notre Dame taught in the school. In 1921 an addition was built onto the school building and a large convent was built next door. A social hall was built in 1927, a kindergarten building added in 1942 and a new school building replaced the old one in 1955.

The parish established Sacred Heart Cemetery in 1909. Sacred Heart Hospital was established adjacent to the parish property in 1912. It was founded by the Sisters of the Third Order of St. Francis of East Peoria, Illinois. It sold its assets for a dollar to a new local hospital corporation in 1977, and became Fort Madison Community Hospital. The original Sacred Heart Hospital building now houses the offices of the Lee County Health Department and the 1956 addition became a continuing care center.

=== Mergers ===
The first merger of the Catholic Community in Fort Madison happened in the parochial schools. Both St. Joseph's and St. Mary's high schools merged in 1925 to form Catholic Central High School in the St. Mary's building. Aquinas High School replaced it on the city's northwest side in 1959. The three parishes continued to operate their own grade schools until 1966 when St. Joseph's, St. Mary's and Sacred Heart were consolidated to form St. Joseph's Middle School for 7th and 8th grade students, using the St. Joseph's building. St. Joseph's K-6 students were then sent to St. Mary's. Sacred Heart and St. Mary's continued to operate their own grade schools until 1977 when they were consolidated to form Aquinas East, which was at St. Joseph's, and Aquinas West at Sacred Heart. By the 1990s the Catholic Schools in Fort Madison and the Marquette Catholic Schools based in nearby West Point were both struggling. The two Catholic school systems merged and a new school named Holy Trinity opened in July 2005.

Demographics in the city of Fort Madison and the Diocese of Davenport began to change in the latter half of the 20th century. Fort Madison lost population and the religious habits of Catholics started to change. The diocese also experienced a decline in the number of priests. A plan to consolidate parishes in the diocese was developed under Bishop Gerald O’Keefe. St. Joseph's and St. Mary's merged in 1996 and used both parish names in the name of the new parish, Saints Mary and Joseph. In 2009 Saints Mary and Joseph merged with Sacred Heart and formed Holy Family Parish.
