= Albright House (Fort Madison, Iowa) =

Historic house in Iowa, United States

- U.S. National Register of Historic Places
- U.S. Historic district – Contributing property
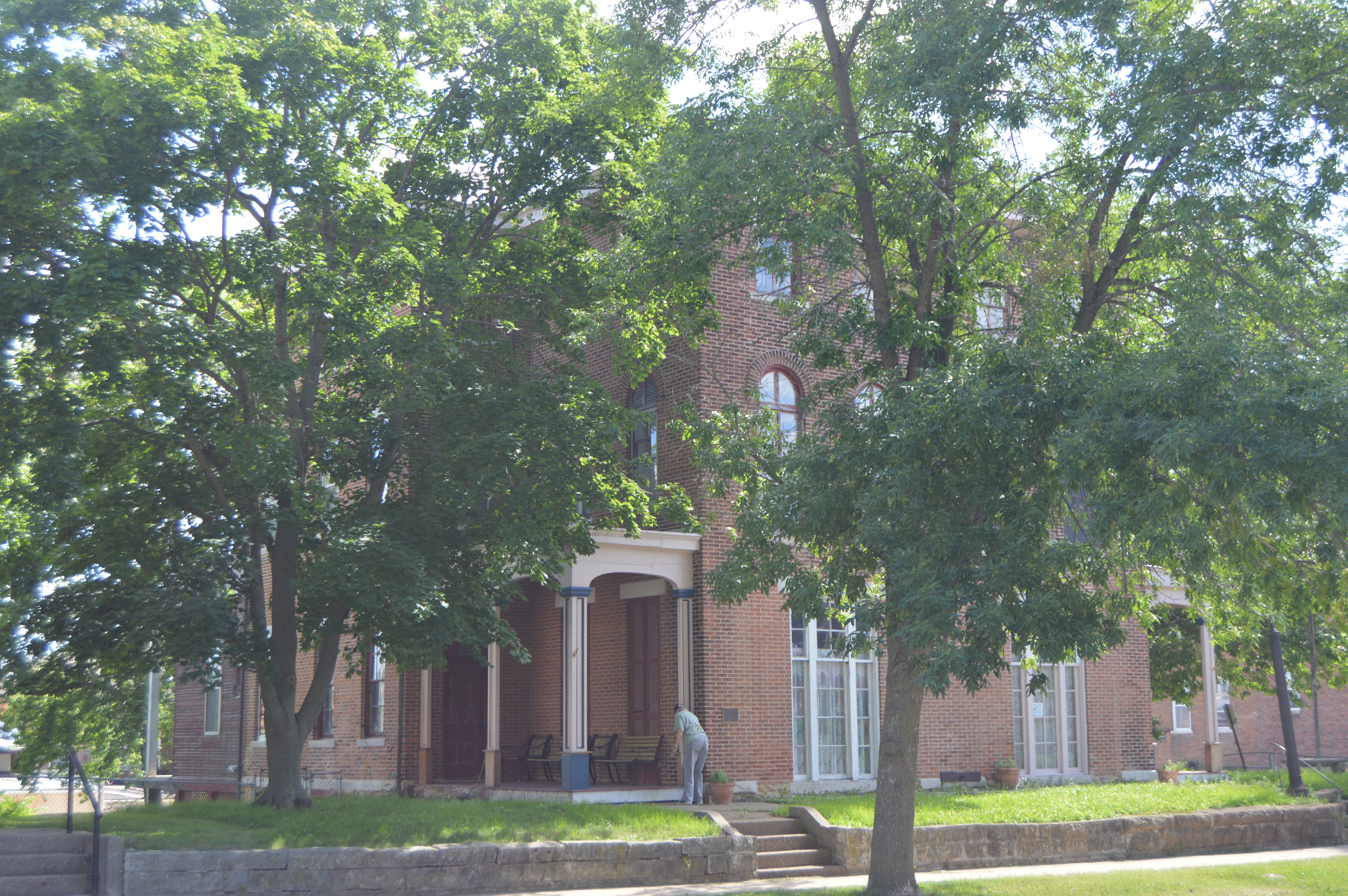

- Location within Iowa Location within the United States
- Location: 716–718 Ave. F, Fort Madison, Iowa
- Coordinates: 40°37′54″N 91°18′38″W
- Area: Less than one acre
- Built: 1858
- Built by: Jacob Albright, William Albright
- Architectural style: Italianate
- Part of: Park-to-Park Residential Historic District (ID14001069)
- NRHP reference No.: 78001233
- Added to NRHP: July 24, 1978

The Albright House, also known as the William and James Albright Duplex and the Betsy Ross House, is a historic building located in Fort Madison, Iowa, United States. It was individually listed on the National Register of Historic Places in 1978. In 2014, it was included as a contributing property in the Park-to-Park Residential Historic District.

The duplex was built in 1858 by brothers Jacob and William Albright, who had moved to Fort Madison in 1839 from Philadelphia. They patterned their house after the design of a double Italianate residence found in Samuel Sloan's The Model Architect (1852). The three-story brick house follows a cross-shaped plan. The watertable, lintels and window sills are all stone. It has a wide, overhanging cornice that is decorated with dentils and paired brackets with pendants. The entrance porch for each unit was built into the front angles of the structure. The house was known locally as the Betsy Ross House because Jacob Albright was married to Rachel Wilson, a granddaughter of Betsy Ross.
