= Terezian =

Coordinates: 45.805°N 24.141°E

Terezian is a residential and industrial district located in the northern part of Sibiu, Romania. It is the second oldest district after the city center, and is named after Maria Theresa.

== History ==
The district has its beginnings in the 17th to 18th centuries; it was then a suburb of the fortified city, inhabited mostly by Romanians. Between 1767 and 1771, the orphanage complex and St. Elizabeth church were built.

In this district were two large markets, Viehmarktplatz (in Romanian Târgul Vitelor, today Terezian Park) and Rossplatz (in Romanian Târgul Cailor, today Gladiolelor and Târgu Cailor streets).

Starting in the late 1950s, apartment buildings were built to replace the old houses. The first were built on Strada Lungă (near Terezian Park), Aleea Petuniei, Strada Gladiolelor.

== Old names ==
The district appears under other names on old maps: Burger-Vorstadt (eastern half) and Sag-Vorstadt (western half) in the 19th century and first half of the 20th century (1900, 1914, 1921 maps); and Suburbiul Ocnei (eastern half) and Suburbiul Turnului (western half) on the 1921 map.
