= St. Luke's Episcopal Church (Lanesborough, Massachusetts) =

Historic church in Massachusetts, United States

- U.S. National Register of Historic Places
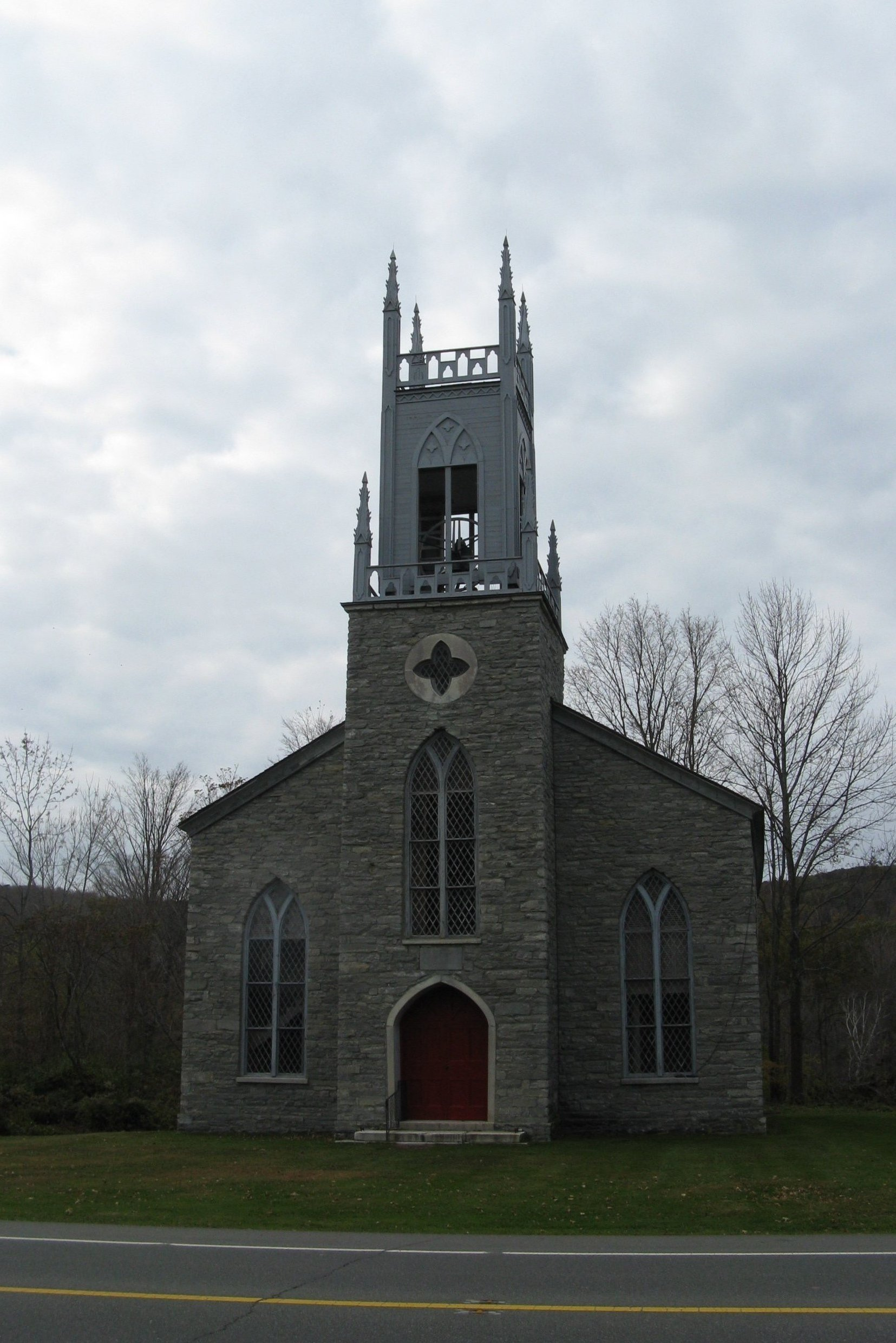

- Location within Massachusetts Location within the United States
- Location: Lanesborough, Massachusetts
- Coordinates: 42°36′6″N 73°13′49″W
- Built: 1836
- Architectural style: Gothic Revival
- NRHP reference No.: 72000127
- Added to NRHP: February 23, 1972

St. Luke's Episcopal Church is a historic church building on United States Route 7 in Lanesborough, Massachusetts. It is an early example of a stone Gothic Revival church, and only one of two surviving 19th century Gothic Revival church buildings in Berkshire County. Listed on the National Register of Historic Places in 1972, it is currently used as a bed and breakfast and event space.

== Description and history ==
St. Luke's is located on the west side of North Main Street (US 7), north of the present village center of Lanesborough. The area where it stands was historically the town's center. The church is a single-story masonry structure, built out of coursed rubble stone. It has a gable roof, with a square tower projecting at the center of the front (east-facing) facade. The base section of the tower is also stone, to a point above the roof ridge, after which it is wooden. The stone section has a surrounding balustrade with wooden spires at the corners, and the wooden stage houses a belfry with paired rectangular openings on each side, topped by lancet-arch panels. The wooden section is also surmounted by a balustrade and wooden spires. The main entrance is at the base of the tower, recessed in a marble lancet-arch opening. Windows are generally lancet-arched, with a quatrefoil window set high on front facade of the tower.

The St. Luke's Episcopalian congregation was established in 1767, and is the oldest Episcopal parish in western Massachusetts. The present church was built in 1836 on land given to the parish in 1785, and is one of two surviving Gothic Revival churches (of four built) in Berkshire County. Its tower was struck by lightning in 1856, and its bell dates to 1891. The eight wooden finial spires were replaced in 1981. At the time of its nomination to the National Register of Historic Places in 1972, it retained virtually all of its interior 19th century fixtures, but had not been used as a church in some time, the congregation having relocated to a Shingle-style wood-frame church built in the town center in 1898.

== See also ==
- National Register of Historic Places listings in Berkshire County, Massachusetts
