= Attenschwiller =

Commune in Grand Est, France

- Commune
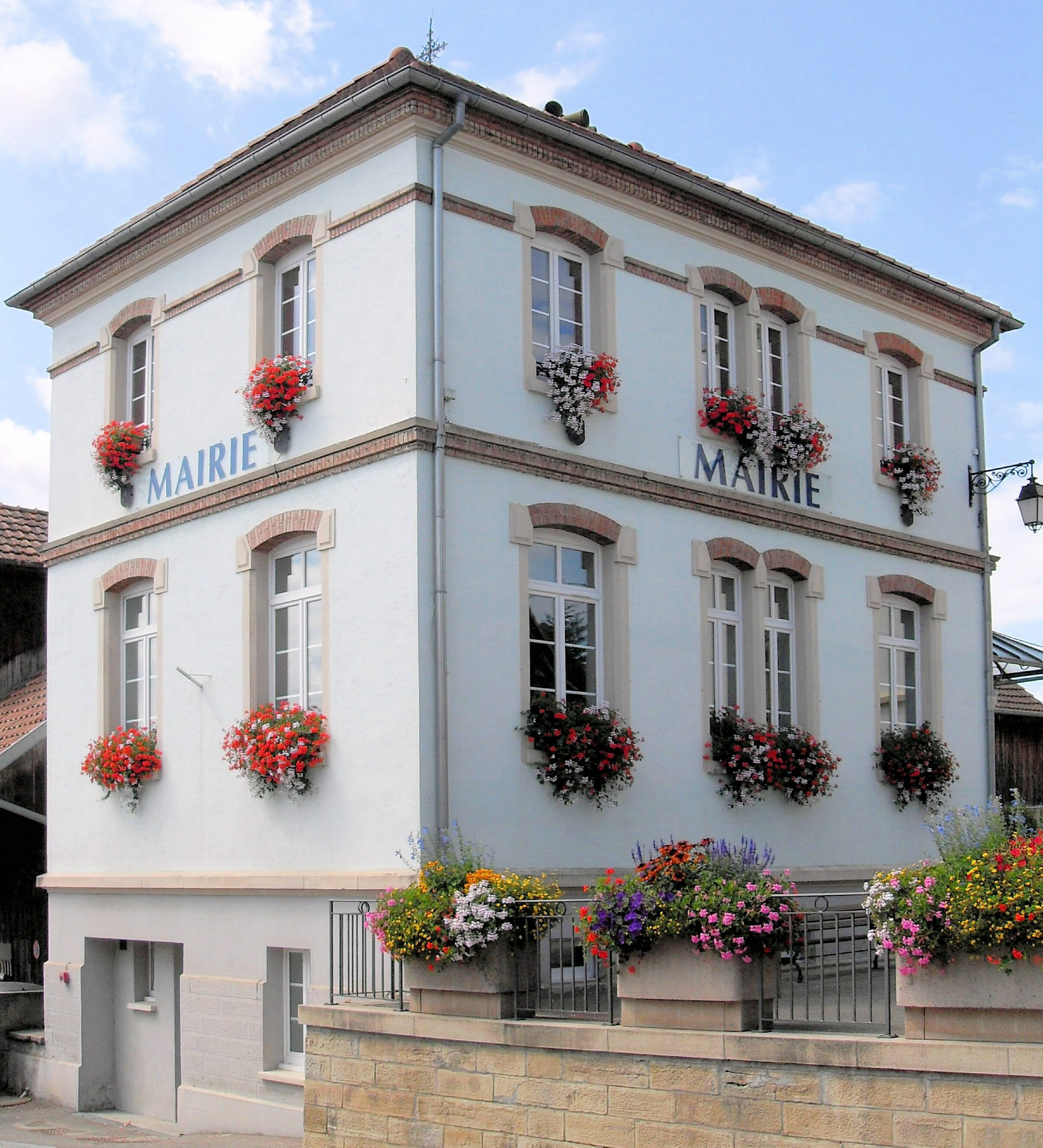
- The town hall in Attenschwiller

- Coat of arms
- Location of Attenschwiller
- Location within France Location within Grand Est
- Coordinates: 47°34′03″N 7°27′54″E
- Country: France
- Region: Grand Est
- Department: Haut-Rhin
- Arrondissement: Mulhouse
- Canton: Saint-Louis
- Intercommunality: Saint-Louis Agglomération

Government
  - Mayor (2020–2026): Denis Wiederkehr
- Area^{1}: 5.11 km^{2} (1.97 sq mi)
- Elevation: 360 m (1,180 ft)
- Highest elevation: 401 m (1,316 ft)
- Lowest elevation: 309 m (1,014 ft)
- Population (2023): 959
  - Density: 188/km^{2} (486/sq mi)
- Time zone: UTC+01:00 (CET)
  - Summer (DST): UTC+02:00 (CEST)
- INSEE/Postal code: 68013 /68220
- ^{1} French Land Register data, which excludes lakes, ponds, glaciers > 1 km^{2} (0.386 sq mi or 247 acres) and river estuaries.

Attenschwiller (French pronunciation: [atənʃvilɛʁ]; German: Attenschweiler) is a commune in the Haut-Rhin department in Alsace in north-eastern France.

== See also ==
- Communes of the Haut-Rhin department
