= St Luke's Church, Silverdale =

Church in Staffordshire, England

Coordinates: 53°01′03″N 2°16′23″W

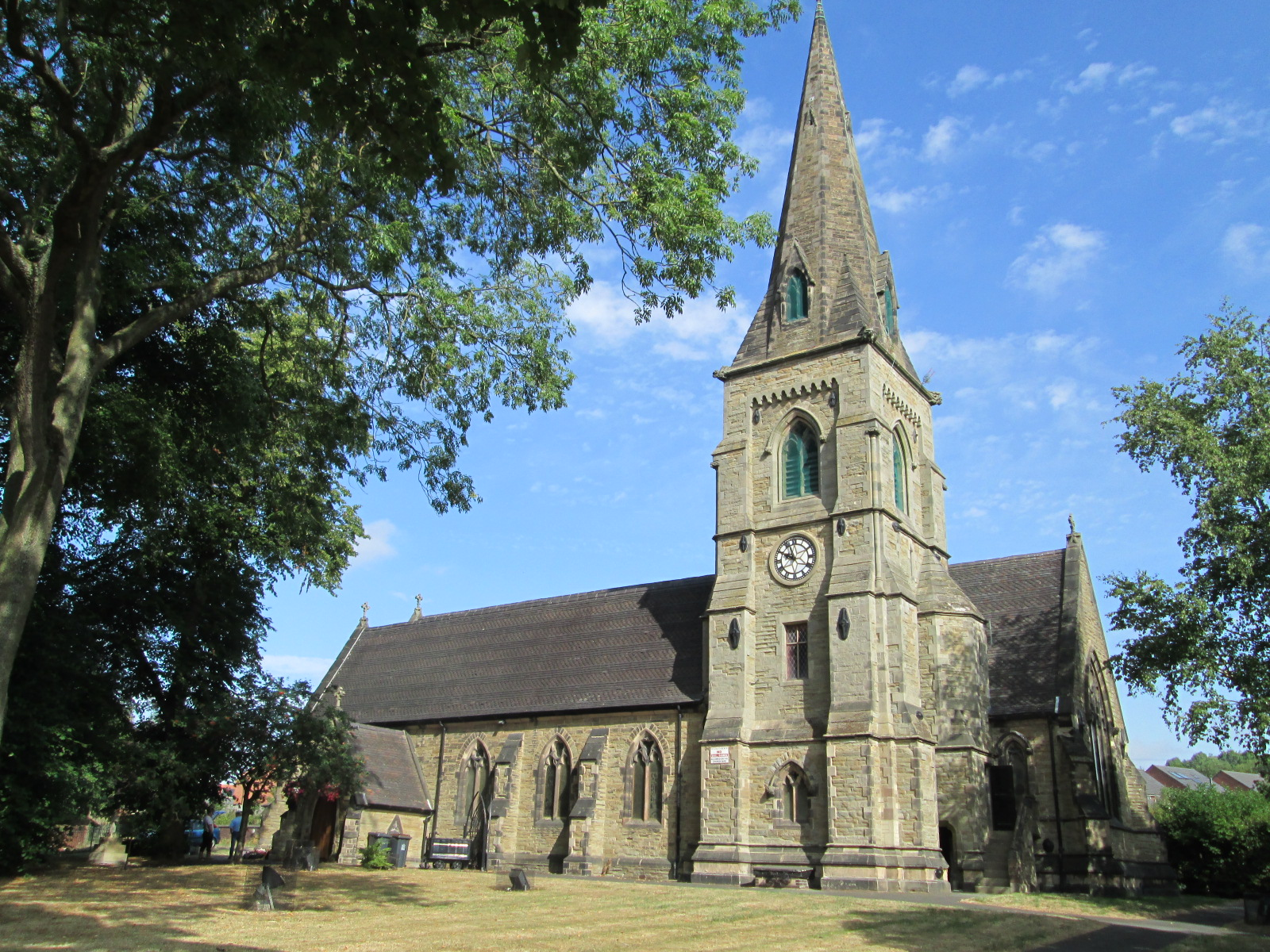
St Luke's Church, Silverdale

St Luke's Church is a grade II listed building in Silverdale in the Borough of Newcastle-under-Lyme, Staffordshire, England. It is the only listed building in the parish of Silverdale.

The church was built in 1853, by R. Armstrong, in the decorated style of Gothic Revival architecture, and is Grade II listed: this is defined as "Buildings of national importance and special interest".

The tower was strengthened in 1948, under the sponsorship of the National Coal Board, after the structure was affected by coal mining related subsidence. The masonry was badly cracked and the tower was beginning to tilt. The masonry was pressure injected with grouting to construct beams. These beams then had a channel or groove between them, steel tendons were laid in the grooves, then filled with concrete, and finally stressed. The intent was that these prestressed concrete beams would absorb any further subsidence. This was one of the earliest uses of prestressed concrete in Britain. The tendons in the beams were secured with Magnel-Blaton steel anchorage plates, the first such use of the Magnel-Blaton system in the United Kingdom.
