= St. Luke's Church (Blue Ridge, Georgia) =

Coordinates: 34.86297°N 84.32034°W

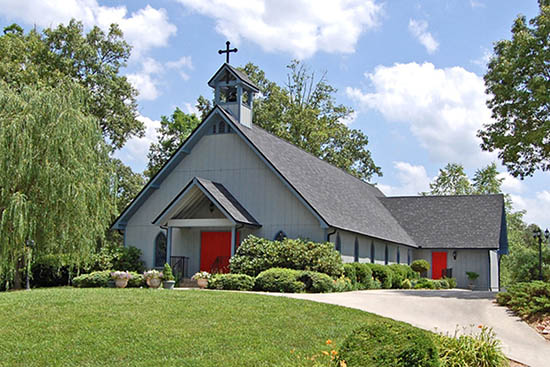
Episcopal / Anglican Church, Blue Ridge, Georgia

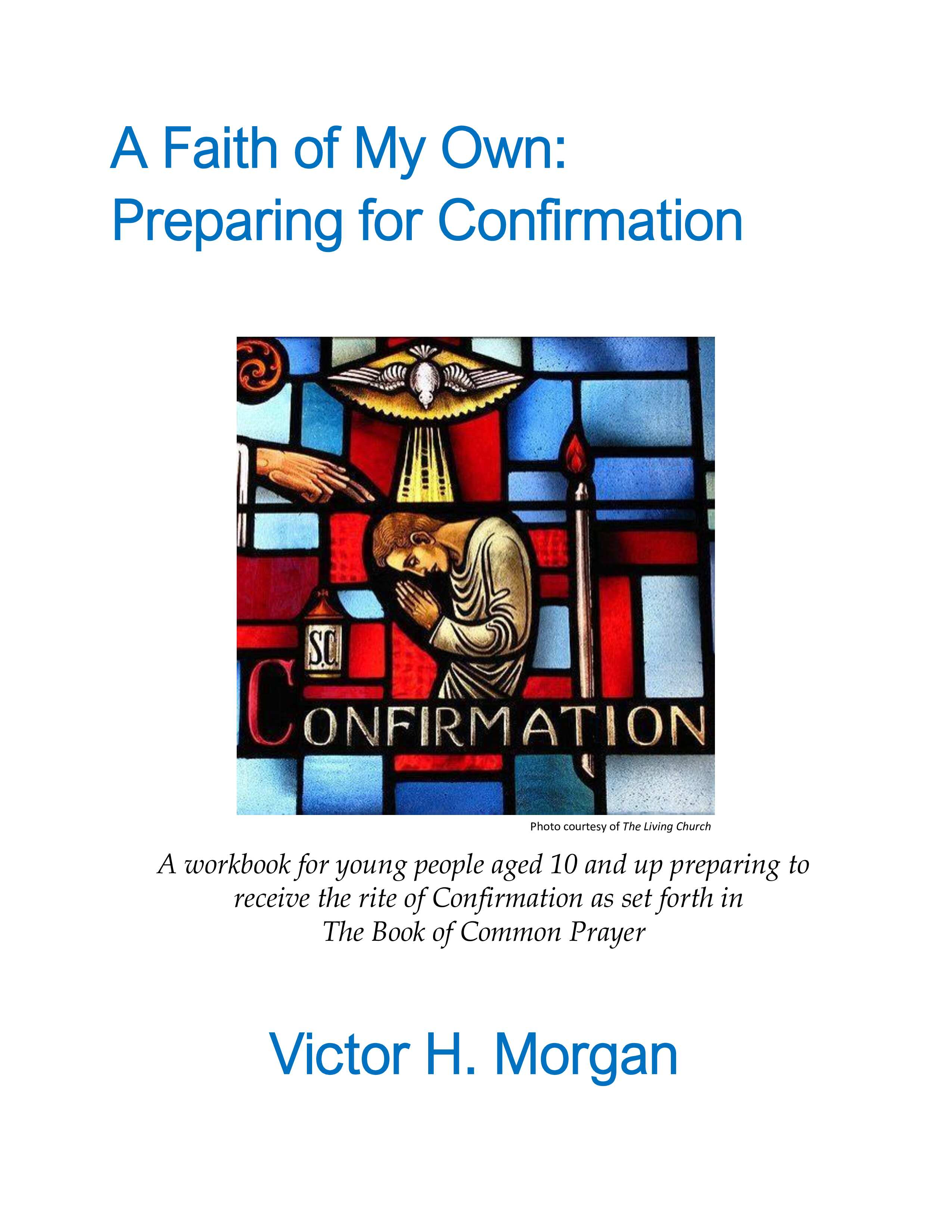

St. Luke's Church, also known as 'The Parish Church of the Mountains', is a congregation in the Anglican (Episcopal) tradition, located in Blue Ridge, Georgia. Founded in 1987 under the auspices of the Traditional Protestant Episcopal Foundation of Alabama, it is now part of the Diocese of the South of the Episcopal Missionary Church (Anglican), and is in communion with the Anglican Church of North America and GAFCON Global Anglican provinces.

Worshippers are drawn from Fannin, Gilmer and Union Counties in Georgia and from Cherokee County in North Carolina and Polk County in Tennessee.

Worship is classical and Biblical and is conducted according to the Book of Common Prayer.

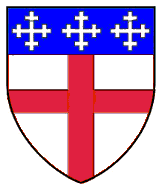
Anglican / Episcopal shield (traditional)

== History ==
The first Anglican / Episcopal service in Blue Ridge was held on June 7, 1987, in the community room of the Blue Ridge City Hall, with 12 persons present. Several weeks after weekly services began, Mrs. David Henry (Willa) Haight III gave several lots near the city center for the construction of a church. One of the lots included a cemetery from the early 20th century containing graves of early settlers of Fannin County. The earliest grave is from 1904. Additional information about those buried in the churchyard is available in Facets of Fannin: A History of Fannin County, Ga.

In 1995, a church of Carpenter Gothic design was constructed on the site located at the corner of Ewings and Jones. The building, enlarged in 2011, has a set of leaded glass windows and much fine walnut woodwork. In 2020, the Clair Wofford Frazier Memorial Organ was installed. It was made in Lancaster, England. The church and grounds are popular with tourists.

The church is the site of the annual Georgia Episcopal / Anglican Men's Conference, usually held in September. Since 1995, St. Luke's Churchyard has been the site of the Blue Ridge Community Easter Egg Hunt.

The Rev. Victor H. Morgan, a native of Jackson, Mississippi, was the founding Rector. Mr. Morgan is a North Georgia newspaper columnist and the author of A Faith of My Own: Preparing for Confirmation. He is a graduate of Mississippi College, attended theological college in Berkeley, Calif., and has served on the Council of the American Friends of Wycliffe Hall, Oxford.
