= St. Luke's Protestant Episcopal Church (Seaford, Delaware) =

Historic church in Delaware, United States

- U.S. National Register of Historic Places
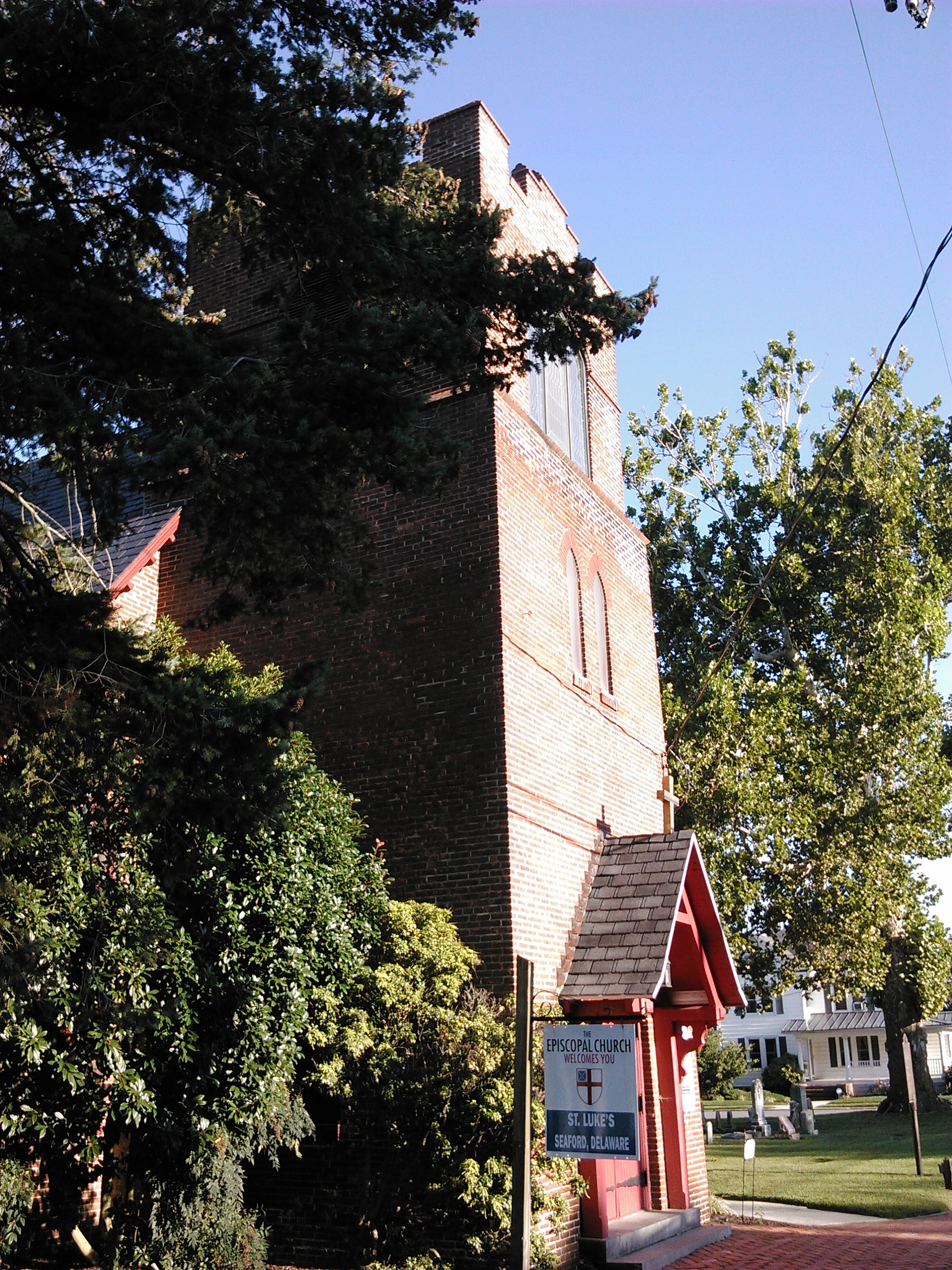

- Location within Delaware Location within the United States
- Location: Front St., Seaford, Delaware
- Coordinates: 38°38′37″N 75°36′33″W
- Built: 1843, 1904
- Architectural style: Late Gothic Revival
- NRHP reference No.: 77000400
- Added to NRHP: October 28, 1977

The St. Luke's Protestant Episcopal Church is a historic Episcopal church located in Seaford, Sussex County, Delaware. It was built in 1843, and reconstructed in 1904. It is a two-story, brick Gothic Revival style building. It has a one-story chancel and crenellated three-story tower. It features stained glass lancet windows. Concrete buttresses were installed in 1943. St. Luke's was organized by the Rev. Corry Chambers in 1835, from the remnants of the former St. Mary's congregation. St. Mary's was founded in 1704, but disestablished after the American Revolution. Delaware Governor William H. H. Ross (1814-1887) is buried in the churchyard.

It was listed on the National Register of Historic Places in 1977.
