= St. Luke's Methodist Church (Monticello, Iowa) =

- U.S. National Register of Historic Places
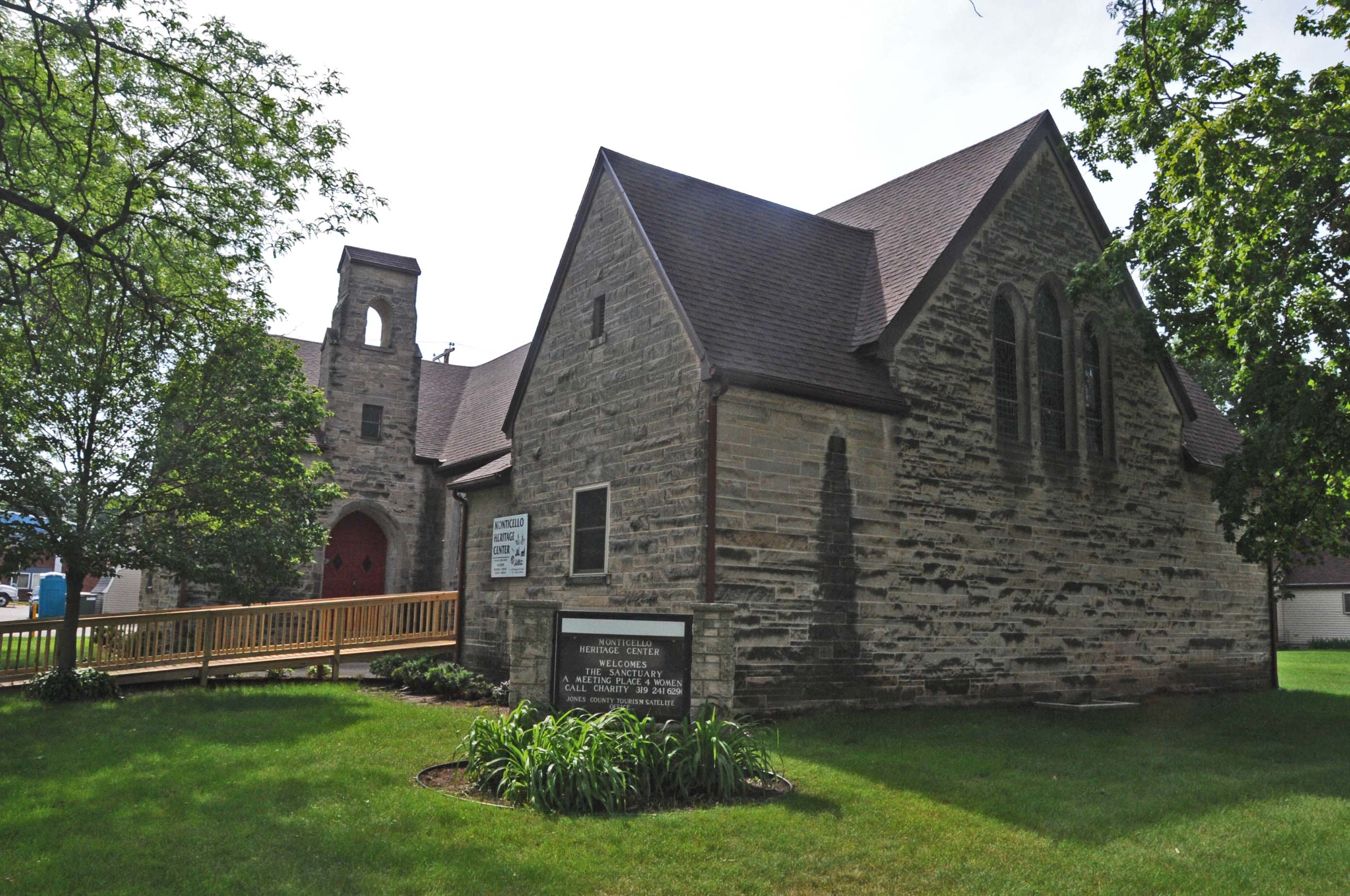

- Location within Iowa Location within the United States
- Location: 211 N. Sycamore; Monticello, Iowa
- Coordinates: 42°14′26″N 91°11′18″W
- Area: less than 1 acre (0.40 ha)
- Built: 1949-50
- Architect: Cram & Ferguson
- Architectural style: Late Gothic Revival
- NRHP reference No.: 01001461
- Added to NRHP: January 17, 2002

St. Luke's Methodist Church is a Late Gothic Revival church in Monticello, Iowa whose church building was completed in 1950. It is now the Monticello Heritage and Cultural Center. It is the only church in Iowa designed by nationally prominent architects Cram & Ferguson, who specialized in ecclesiastical architecture.

The church congregation sought high design quality and, as recorded in the NRHP nomination for the church, the local newspaper reported in 1949 that

It was felt that the church building could never be better than its design so an effort was made to secure the ablest architects available and the world famous firm of Cram & Ferguson of Boston were selected. This firm was the designers of the Great Episcopal Cathedrals in New York (Cathedral of St. John the Divine) and Detroit (Cathedral Church of St. Paul), St. Thomas Church and Christ Methodist in New York, Calgary Church in Pittsburgh, the House of Hope Presbyterian Church in St. Paul, the famous Fourth Presbyterian Church in Chicago and hundreds of other churches throughout the eastern part of the nation. This is, however, their first church in Iowa. (Monticello Express 1949 "Drawing of the New Methodist Church")

How the building committee of St. Luke's Church got connected to the Boston architectural firm is not known, but may have been through Rev. Dr. Daniel L. Marsh (1880-1968). Marsh, president of Methodist-affiliated Boston University, obtained Cram & Ferguson to design Marsh Chapel and many other campus buildings which were widely covered in Methodist publications.

The congregation was founded in 1858 and built its first church, on this site, in 1863, at cost of $1,750.00. The original was replaced in 1899 by a second that suffered design problems. The 1949-1950 church is the third Methodist church. After its completion the congregation had 350 members, but eventually declined and in the 1990s joined up with the local Congregational church to form the United Church of Monticello. The combined church alternated worship services in the two churches for a time. The St. Luke's church was eventually provided to the Monticello Heritage and Cultural Center, a group interested in its preservation, which obtained a grant from the Historic Site Preservation Grant Program of the State Historical Society of Iowa in 2000, enabling it to purchase the property. In 2001, the building was being used as a performance venue, for cultural programs, and as a history museum.

There was a design challenge in the small church's requirement for a large community room, as a steeply pitched roof consistent with Late Gothic Revival styling could have required a very high roofline, higher than on the main church area. This was solved by designing a somewhat complex roof system that had ups and downs. Gothic Revival styling is also apparent in building materials choices and in many architectural details.

It was listed on the National Register of Historic Places in 2002. It was deemed significant as an illustration of how the Cram & Ferguson architects adapted Late Gothic Revival styling to the design of a small church.

== See also ==
- St. Luke's United Methodist Church (Dubuque, Iowa), NRHP-listed, in Dubuque County
