= St. Luke's Episcopal Church (Fort Madison, Iowa) =

- Hope Episcopal Church
- U.S. Historic district – Contributing property
- Location within Iowa Location within the United States
- Location: 605 Avenue E Fort Madison, Iowa
- Coordinates: 40°37′59.33″N 91°18′29.5″W
- Area: less than one acre
- Built: 1857
- Architect: Charles A. Dunham (renovation)
- Architectural style: Gothic Revival
- Part of: Park-to-Park Residential Historic District (ID14001069)
- Added to NRHP: December 22, 2014

St. Luke's Episcopal Church, formerly known as Hope Episcopal Church, is a historic church building located in Fort Madison, Iowa, United States. It is a parish church of the Episcopal Diocese of Iowa, and it is a contributing property in the Park-to-Park Residential Historic District listed on the National Register of Historic Places.

== History ==
The congregation was founded in 1847 as Hope Episcopal Church. They built the brick, Gothic Revival-style church on a stone foundation in 1857. Burlington architect Charles A. Dunham designed the renovation of the church in 1886, and electric lights were added two years later. A rectory to house the parish priest was built from 1889 to 1890. It was torn down sometime around 1958. The choir room in the church was enlarged and opened to the sanctuary in 1896. In 1905 the congregation changed its name to St. Luke's. The sanctuary floor was lowered and other remodeling projects were completed in 1925. The parish house was added to the rear of the church from 1928 to 1929. It was designed by Fort Madison architect Robin Carswell and constructed by Alhen Brothers contractors. Another extensive remodeling of the church occurred in the late 1940s or early 1950s. The church office addition was constructed in 1966.
