= St. Luke's Episcopal Church (Cincinnati, Ohio) =

- Episcopal Church of the Resurrection
- U.S. National Register of Historic Places
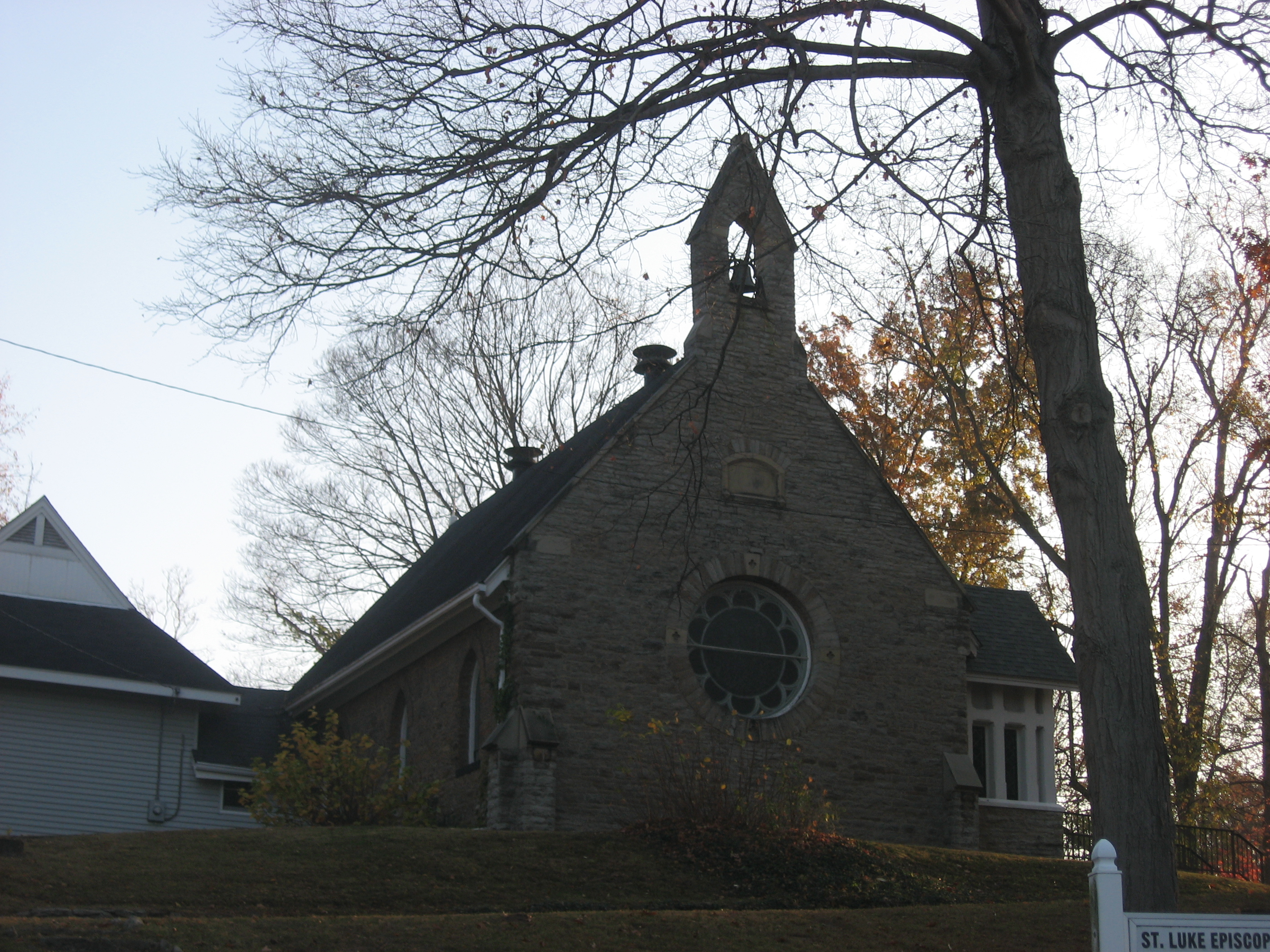
- Front and western side of the church

- Location within Ohio Location within the United States
- Location: 7346-7348 Kirkwood La., Cincinnati, Ohio
- Coordinates: 39°7′36″N 84°42′10″W
- Area: Less than 1 acre (0.40 ha)
- Built: 1877
- Architect: Samuel Hannaford, et al
- MPS: Samuel Hannaford and Sons TR in Hamilton County
- NRHP reference No.: 77001064
- Added to NRHP: April 13, 1977

St. Luke's Episcopal Church, formerly the Episcopal Church of the Resurrection, is a historic Episcopal church in the Sayler Park neighborhood of Cincinnati, Ohio, United States. Designed in the 1870s by master architect Samuel Hannaford, it has been named a historic site.

== History ==
The community of Fernbank was platted by Charles W. Short in 1875; it was a separate community for more than one-third of a century before annexation into Cincinnati as that city's Sayler Park neighborhood in 1911. Within a year of its establishment, Episcopalians in the community began meeting for worship, using each other's homes at first. The situation changed in 1877, as Short and his brother John Cleves Short donated money to erect a church building for the congregation in honor of their deceased parents. An English Gothic-influenced design was chosen, and Samuel Hannaford was hired as the architect. At this time, Hannaford was going through a time of transition: he was suddenly well known as the designer of the new Music Hall near downtown, and after many years of partnership, he was beginning to operate his firm by himself. St. Luke's is typical of Hannaford's churches from the period, most of which were stone Gothic Revival structures.

== Architecture ==
One story tall, St. Luke's is a simple rectangle in its floor plan, with ends that rise to steep gables. A small bell gable is placed at one end, sitting atop rubble masonry walls, while a large circular window sits under it at the center of the gable. On one side sits an ornate frame-built vestibule with large timbers visible for structural support. These elements, together with the small ogive windows set into the walls, lend the building the appearance of an English country church.

== Preservation ==
From its earliest years, the parish was known as the Church of the Resurrection, and it retained this name into the 1970s, although its name has since been changed to that of St. Luke. The parish is subject to the jurisdiction of the Episcopal Diocese of Southern Ohio.

In 1977, the Church of the Resurrection was listed on the National Register of Historic Places; it qualified for inclusion due to its well-preserved historic architecture. One year later, nearly 40 other properties in Cincinnati and other parts of Hamilton County, including 9 other churches, were added to the Register together as part of a multiple property submission of buildings designed by Samuel Hannaford and/or his sons. Although it was already listed on the Register, the Church of the Resurrection was included within the multiple property submission as another significant Hannaford design.

The building changed hands in 2021 and was sold to the Hillgrove family. A significant exterior restoration has since started and the building will be converted to a private residence. A consecrated altar still stands to the rear of the property.
