= St. Luke's United Methodist Church (Dubuque, Iowa) =

- St. Luke's Methodist Episcopal Church
- U.S. National Register of Historic Places
- U.S. Historic district – Contributing property
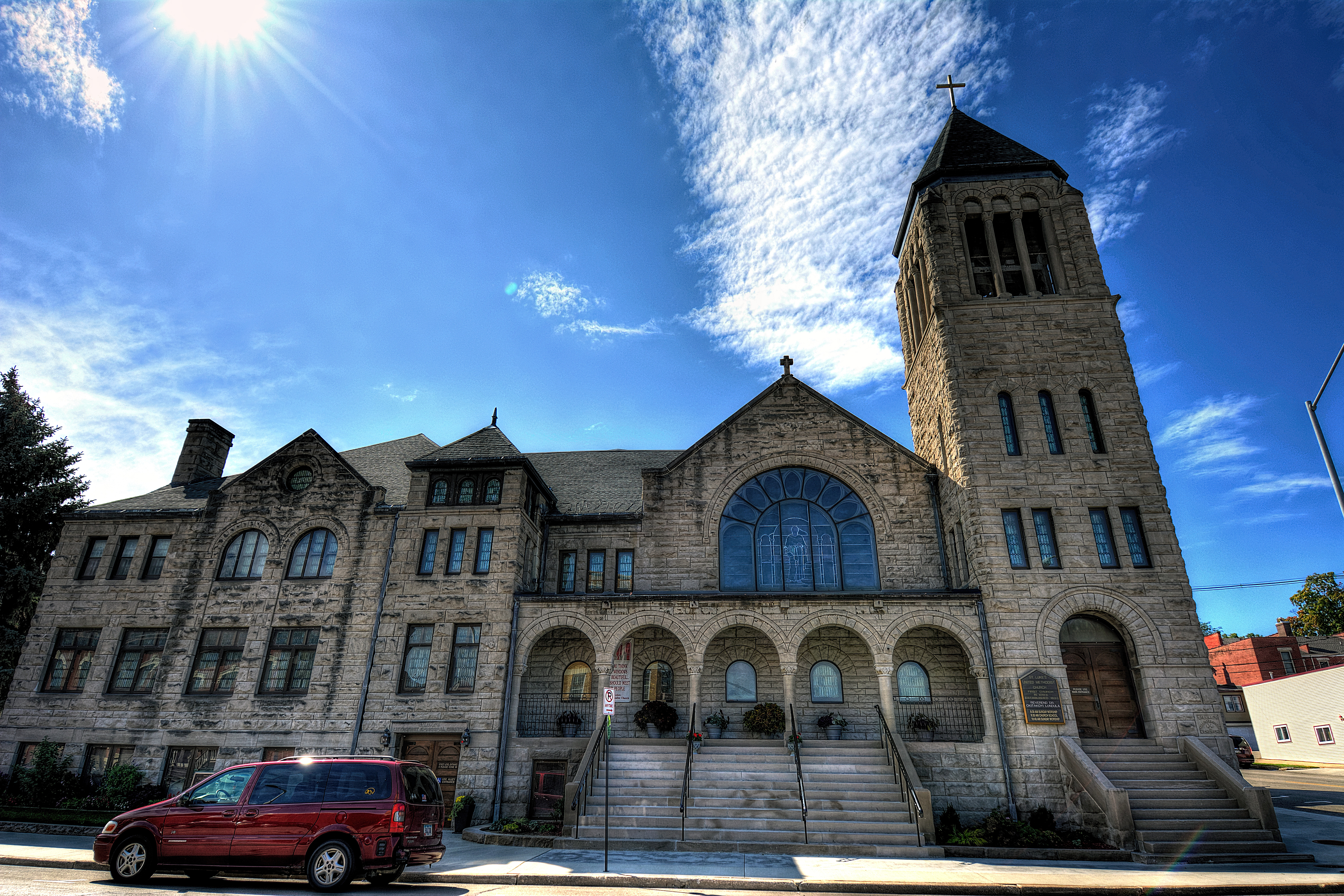

- Location within Iowa Location within the United States
- Location: 1199 Main St. Dubuque, Iowa
- Coordinates: 42°30′14.4″N 90°40′8.4″W
- Architect: George Kramer
- Architectural style: Richardsonian Romanesque
- Part of: Upper Main Street Historic District (ID86002102)
- NRHP reference No.: 98000387
- Added to NRHP: April 23, 1998

St. Luke's United Methodist Church, also known as St. Luke's Methodist and as St. Luke's United Methodist, is a historic Richardsonian Romanesque-style church located at 1199 Main Street in Dubuque, Iowa. It was individually listed on the National Register of Historic Places in 1998, and as a contributing property in the Upper Main Street Historic District in 2005. It is part of the Iowa Conference of the United Methodist Church.

The church has more Tiffany windows than any other church in the state.

According to its NRHP nomination, the building is significant for its history in religion in Dubuque, for its Richardsonian Romanesque (unique in Dubuque), and for its Tiffany glass.

== National Register listing ==
- Historic Significance: Architecture/Engineering
- Architect, builder, or engineer: Tiffany Glass and Decorating Co., Kramer, George W.
- Architectural Style: Romanesque
- Area of Significance: Art, Architecture
- Period of Significance: 1875–1899
- Historic Function: Religion
- Historic Sub-function: Church Related Residence, Religious Structure
- Current Function: Commerce/Trade, Religion
- Current Sub-function: Professional, Religious Structure

== History ==
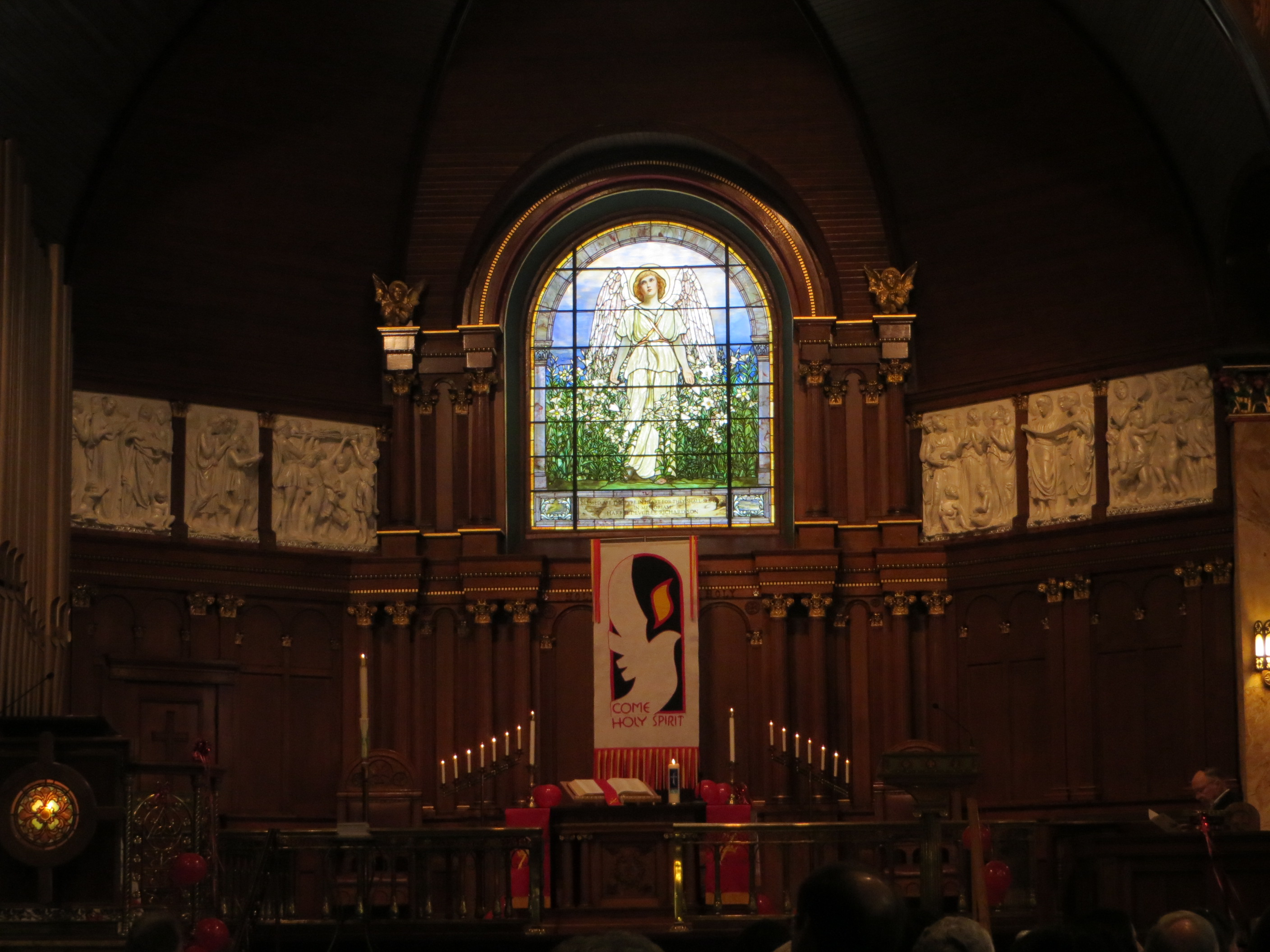
Church interior

The church can trace its origins back to the founding of the city of Dubuque. Barton Randle, preached the first sermon on Iowa soil on November 6, 1833. First services were held in 1833 in a multipurpose log cabin building in what is now Washington Square. Subsequent buildings were built in 1834 (also in what is now Washington Square), 1839 (across the street), 1853 (on Main Street between 11th and 12th Streets), and the current building at the corner of 12th and Main Streets.

The present church was built in 1896, and the congregation began worshiping in the building in 1897. The church is noted for their collection of over 100 Tiffany Stained glass windows. It has been called "one of the five finest Religious Tiffany collections in the world." The Angel in the window of the Angel among the Lilies is rumored to bear the likeness of the young deceased daughter of the people who had sponsored that particular window. Since 1990, the church has made an effort to restore and preserve these windows.

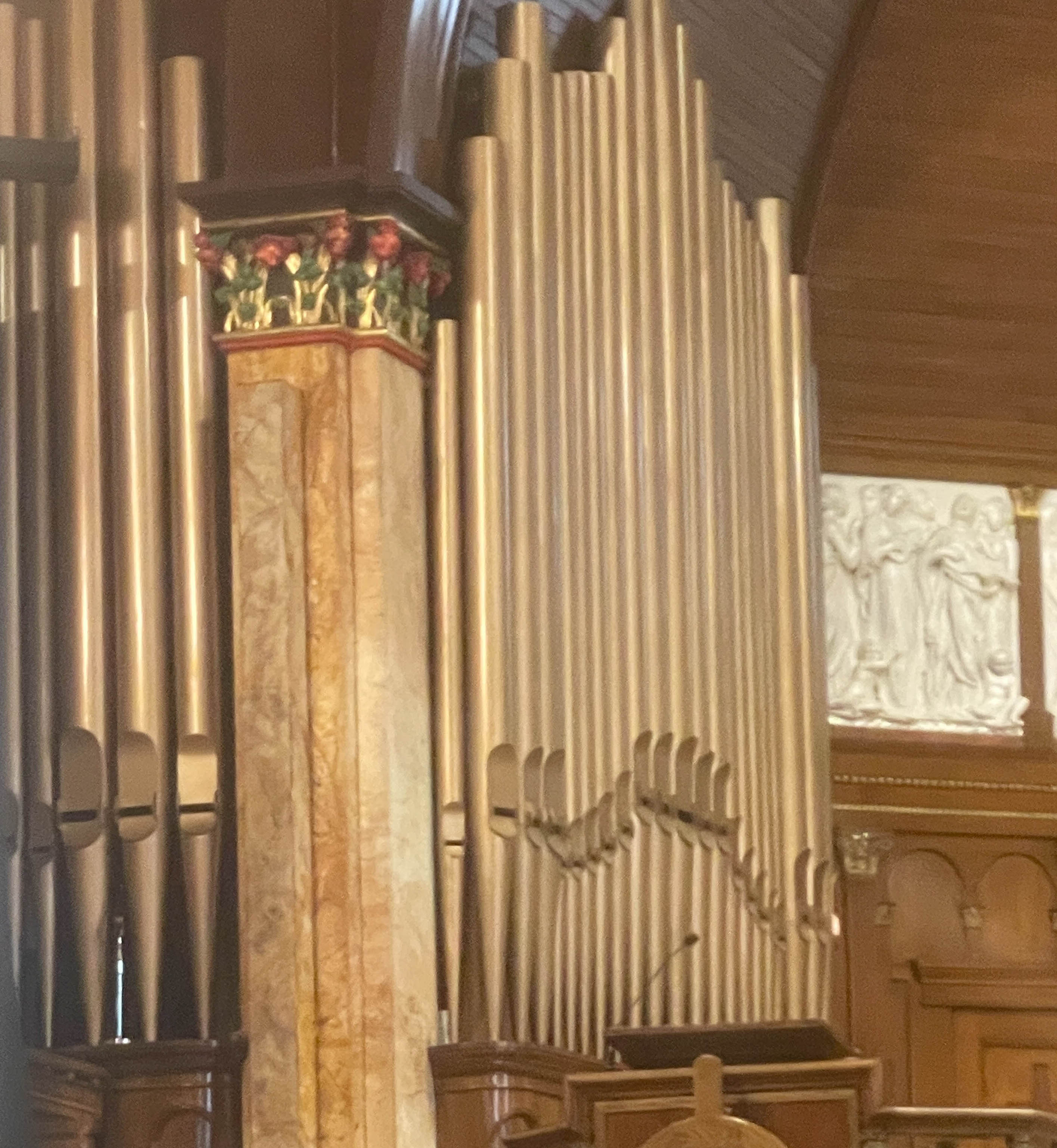
The Farrand & Votey Organ.

The pipe organ in the church is also of historic interest. When the organ was purchased from the Farrand & Votey Organ Company, two train cars were required to bring the parts to Dubuque. Because the train could not get across the river, barges than were used to float the parts over so that they could be installed in the church. At the time of installation, it was one of the largest organs in the area; however, over the years it has been eclipsed by others. The instrument contains 36 ranks, 2,060 pipes in total, and was rebuilt in 1992 by the Fowler Organ Company, Lansing, Michigan.

== See also ==
- St. Luke's Methodist Church (Monticello, Iowa), NRHP-listed, known also as St. Luke's United Methodist Church, in Jones County
