= Craig and Virginia Sheaffer House =

Historic house in Iowa, United States

- U.S. National Register of Historic Places
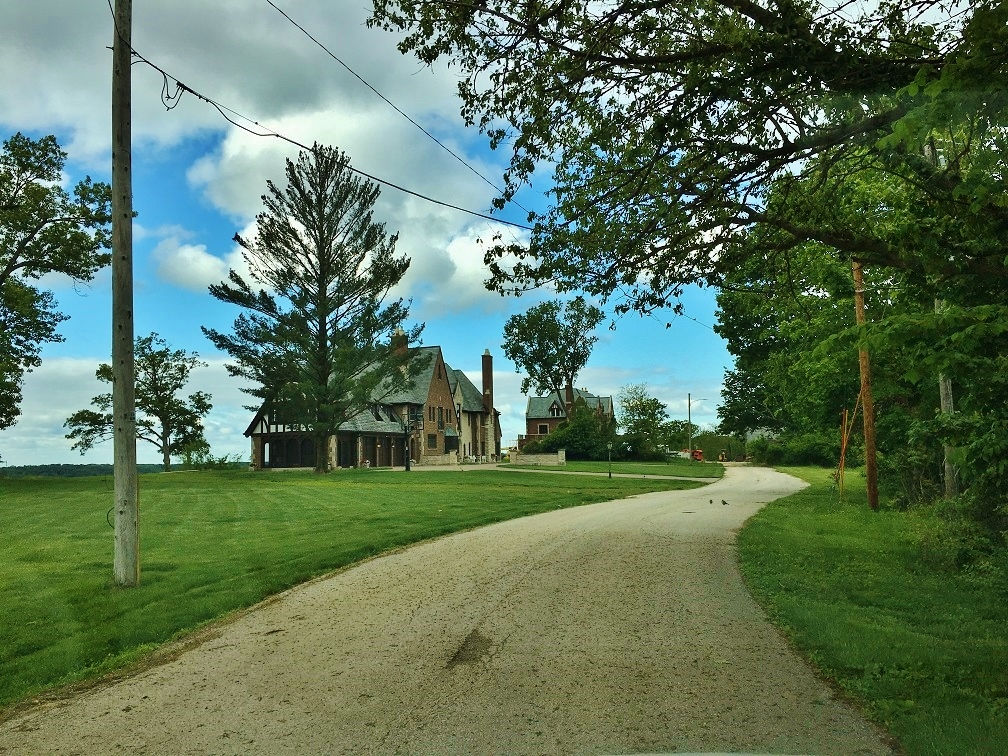
- The Craig and Virginia Sheaffer House is on the left, The Walter A. Sheaffer House is on the right

- Location within Iowa Location within the United States
- Location: 10 High Point; Fort Madison, Iowa
- Coordinates: 40°38′04″N 91°17′10″W
- Area: 2.5 acres (1.0 ha)
- Built: 1929
- Architect: Mayo and Mayo
- Architectural style: Tudor Revival
- NRHP reference No.: 93000329
- Added to NRHP: April 22, 1993

The Craig and Virginia Sheaffer House, also known as the John and Marion Keenan House, is a historic residence located in Fort Madison, Iowa, United States. It was listed on the National Register of Historic Places in 1993.

Craig Sheaffer served as the president of the Sheaffer Pen Company, which had been established by his father Walter, and as an Under Secretary of Commerce during part of World War II. The house is part of a complex of houses built by the Sheaffer family. The Walter A. Sheaffer House just to the west of this house is also listed on the National Register. The other two houses were built for Craig and Virginia's sons Walter and John. John and Marion Keenan bought this house from the Sheaffer family. He also served as president of the Sheaffer Pen Company.

The Craig and Virginia Sheaffer House is a large Tudor Revival completed in 1929. It was designed by the Chicago architectural firm of Mayo and Mayo. The north and south elevations of the 2½-story house are 138 feet (4,206 cm) long. It is located on a landscaped property on a bluff overlooking the Mississippi River. The landscaping, completed in 1931, is a contributing site in the house's historic nomination. The exterior is mostly composed of textured brick laid in both patterned and Flemish bond coursing. Some of the gables are faced with limestone while other wall surfaces are composed of a mix of brick and stone. One of the gables and another section of the house feature half-timbering composed of cypress wood and stucco infill.
