= Walter A. Sheaffer House =

Historic house in Iowa, United States

- U.S. National Register of Historic Places
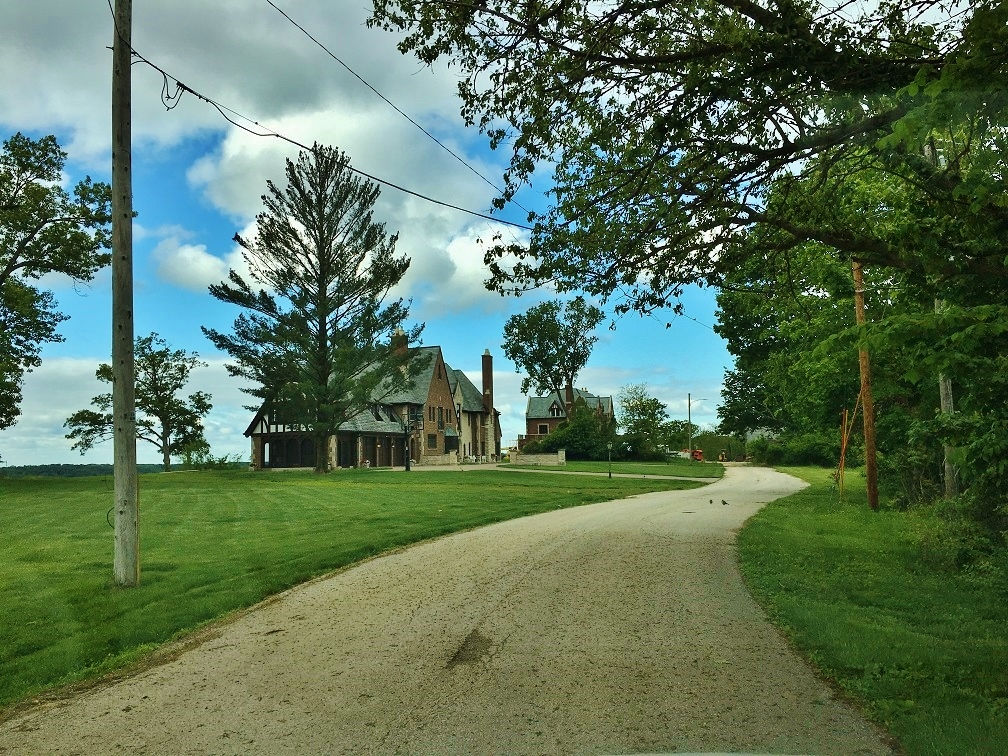
- The Walter Sheaffer House is on the right, The Craig and Virginia Sheaffer House is on the left

- Location within Iowa Location within the United States
- Location: 11 High Point; Fort Madison, Iowa
- Coordinates: 40°38′02″N 91°17′14″W
- Area: 8 acres (3.2 ha)
- Built: 1929-1930
- Architect: Mayo and Mayo
- Architectural style: Jacobean
- NRHP reference No.: 06000858
- Added to NRHP: September 19, 2006

The Walter A. Sheaffer House, also known as the Craig & Margaret Abolt House, is a historic residence located in Fort Madison, Iowa, United States. It was listed on the National Register of Historic Places in 2006. The listing includes two structures, the main house and the garage cottage.

== History ==
Walter A. Sheaffer was the inventor of the lever-filled fountain pen, and he founded the Sheaffer Pen Company to produce it. The house is part of a complex of houses built by the Sheaffer family. The Craig and Virginia Sheaffer House (1929), Walter's son and daughter-in-law, located just to the east of this house is also listed on the National Register. The Walter Sheaffer House is a 16,000-square-foot (1,500 m^{2}) structure completed in 1930. It was designed by the Chicago architectural firm of Mayo and Mayo. The other two houses in the complex were built later for Craig and Virginia's sons Walter and John.

== Architecture ==
The Walter Sheaffer House is located at the top of a 200-foot (61 m) bluff overlooking the Mississippi River. The house is a combination of Tudor Revival and Renaissance Revival features that when used together are known as the Jacobean style. The Tudor Revival features of the 2½-story brick house are two stone-parapeted gables, two dormers with half-timbered gable ends, a two-story stone-framed bay window, and a porte cochere with three flattened arches in the Tudor style. The corner and window quoins are from the Renaissance Revival style.

The single-story garage cottage served as the living quarters for the Sheaffer's butler/chauffeur and his wife, who served the family as their cook. The three garage entrances are in an exposed basement. The Tudor Revival structure is also brick laid in a common bond.
