= ThinkPad TransNote =

Notebook computer by IBM

IBM ThinkPad TransNote

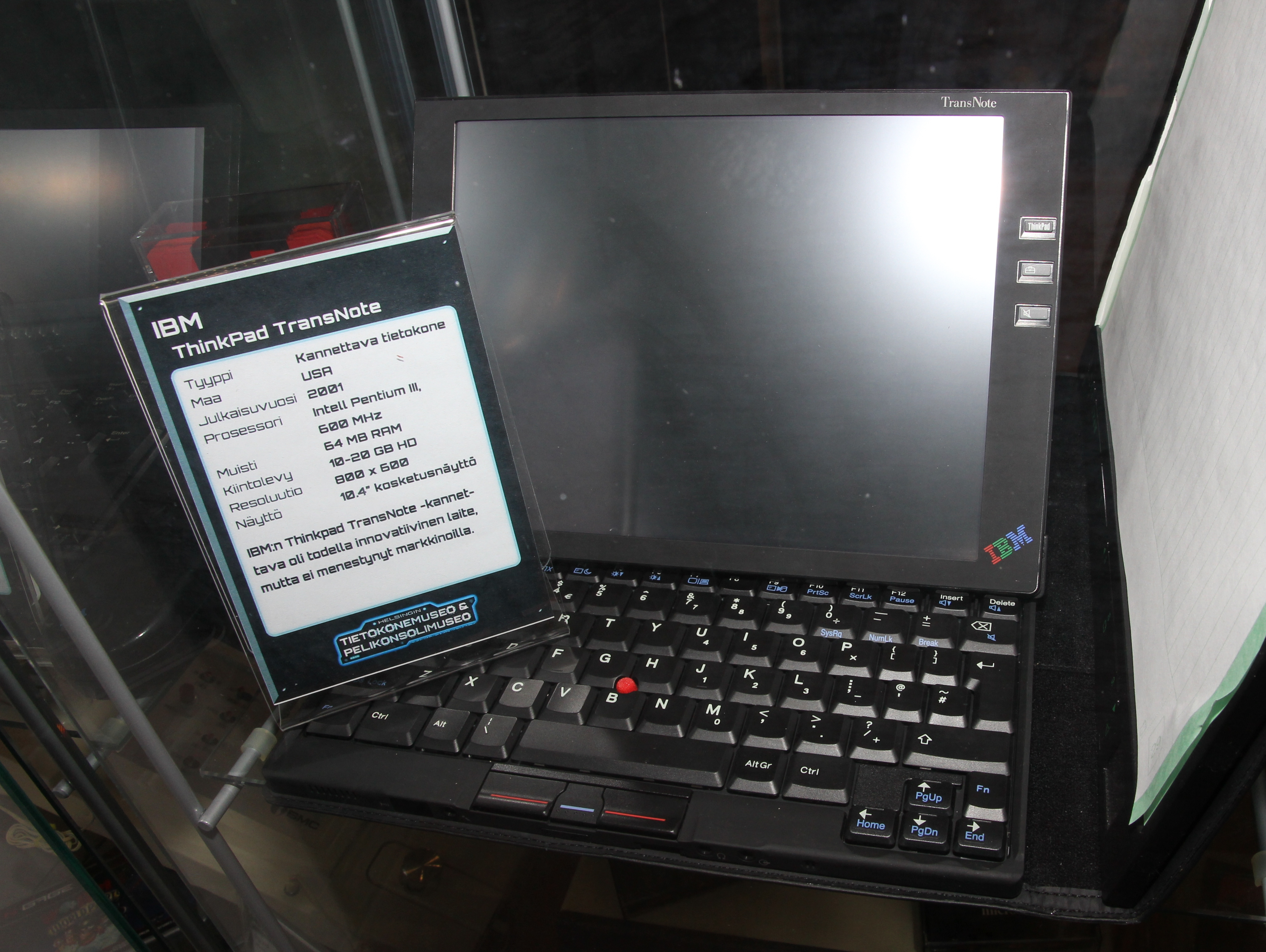
- IBM ThinkPad TransNote
- Manufacturer: IBM
- Product family: ThinkPad
- Type: 2-in-1 PC, Graphics tablet
- Released: February 28, 2001; 25 years ago
- Discontinued: October 28, 2003; 22 years ago
- Operating system: Windows 98 SE; Windows 2000
- CPU: Mobile Intel Pentium III (Coppermine) @ 600 MHz
- Memory: 64-320 MB PC100 SDRAM
- Storage: 10 or 20 GB HDD
- Removable storage: CompactFlash
- Display: 10.4" SVGA TFT Touchscreen
- Graphics: ATI Rage Mobility M
- Made in: Mexico: Guadalajara, Jalisco (Guadalajara Plant); Japan: Fujisawa, Kanagawa (Fujisawa Plant); United Kingdom: Greenock, Scotland (Greenock Plant); China: Shenzhen, Guangdong (IIPC)

The ThinkPad TransNote is a notebook computer by IBM that was launched in February 2001.

== Design ==
The TransNote was an internal collaboration between IBM's Research and Personal Computing Division (PCD). Randy Moulic, manager of client systems at IBM, merged the pen technologies group and mobile PC platform group to work on the prototype. John Karidis was responsible for the mechanical design of the TransNote. Kardis and Ronald Smith developed the system that allows the TransNote to fold on top of itself to reduce the footprint of the device.

The TransNote was created to combine the CrossPad which IBM developed in collaboration with A.T. Cross and a laptop computer, specifically the ThinkPad. IBM was targeting two groups with the development of the TransNote: note-takers and graphic-intensive users.

The TransNote received several patents for its design and features.

== Features ==
The TransNote consists of a leather-type folio case which contains a computer on one side and a notebook of paper on the other side.

The technology of CrossPad would transform as the ThinkScribe on the TransNote. The ThinkScribe pad had 2 megabytes (2MB) of internal memory to record notes that could be stored and then transferred to the computer component. The notes were able to be converted to JPEG, TIFF or PDF.

The hardware relies on the use of the software package: InkManagerPro which was developed for the TransNote.

== Specifications ==
The TransNote comes equipped with:

- 10.4" TFT FlipTouch display (800x600 resolution)
- 600 MHz Intel Mobile Pentium III
- ATi Rage Mobility M 4MB
- 10GB or 20GB HDD
- 64MB PC-100 memory standard, 320 MB max
- CompactFlash slot
- CardBus slot (type 2)
- PC Card slot.
- Two audio controllers:
  - Intel AC'97 Audio with a CS4297A codec
  - Crystal Semiconductor CS4281
- MiniPCI slot with one of the following:
  - 3Com 10/100 Ethernet Mini-PCI Adapter with 56K Modem
  - Xircom 10/100 EtherJet Mini PCI Adapter with 56K Modem
- ThinkScribe digital notepad

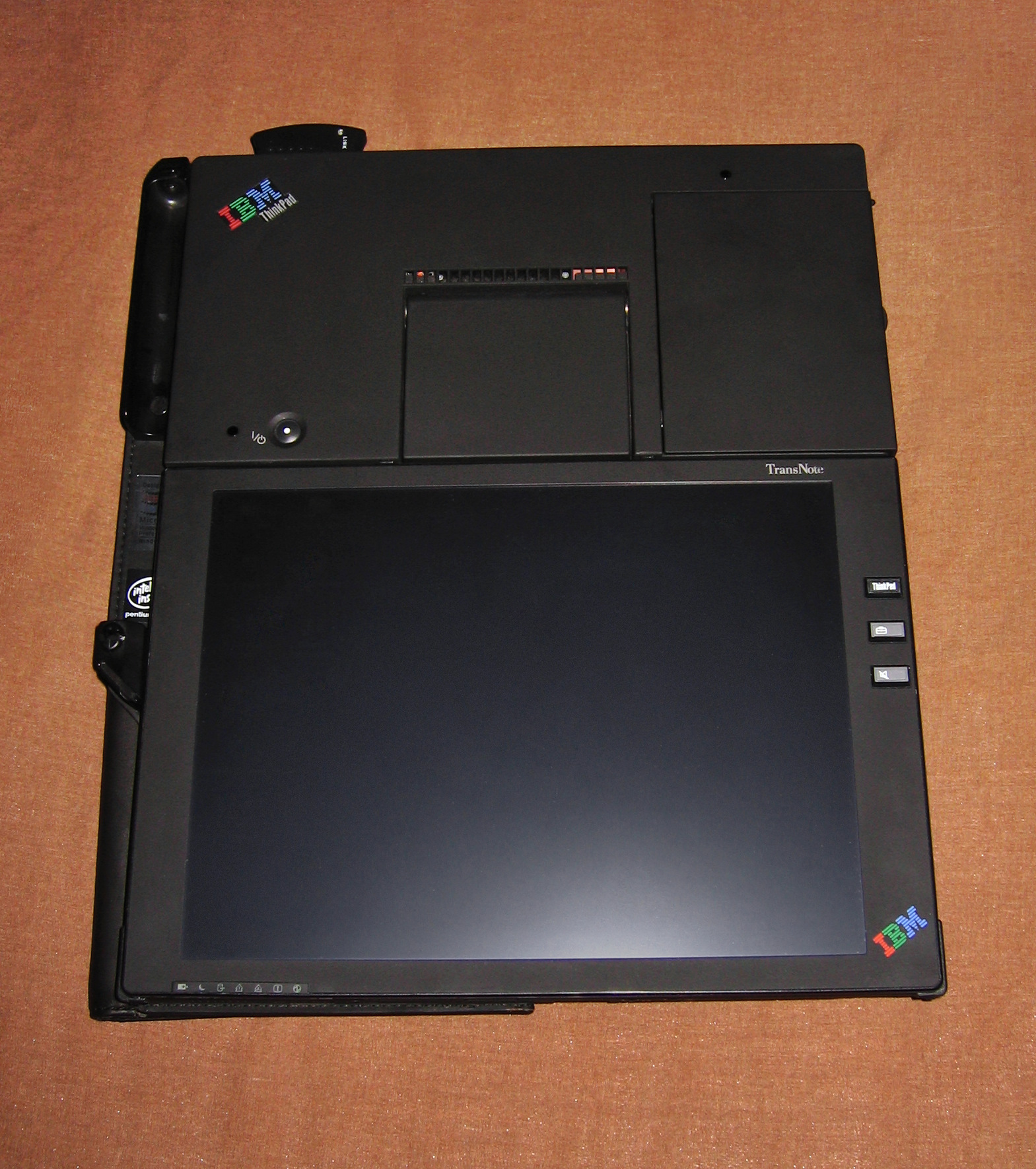
Folded TransNote with opened cover

The battery pack uses flat Samsung 103450 cells.

== Reception ==
Computerworld called it a "failed design" because it tried to blend a large 3M digitized pad with a tiny under-powered laptop in the same product. PCQuest viewed it as an attractive choice for people who travel a lot. TechRepublic called it one of the 25 "unique and bizarre breakthroughs" in laptop innovation.

=== Awards ===
The TransNote won a Gold iF Product Design Award in 2002 in the product discipline. The TransNote was the winner in the PC category of the PC Magazine Awards for Technical Excellence in 2001. It also won an IDSA IDEA Award in 2001.

=== Academia ===
The TransNote was utilized in a handwriting study that examined the writing speed and "wrinkliness" as it related to forged handwriting.

== Further developments ==
IBM announced the discontinuation of the TransNote in February 2002, intending to discontinue it at the end of the year. John Karidis noted that IBM learned a lot about the tablet PC market and the kinds of customers that use these devices.
