= Kate Harrington (poet) =

American poet

- Born: September 20, 1831 Allegheny, Pennsylvania, United States
- Died: May 29, 1917 (aged 85) Fort Madison, Iowa, United States
- Occupation: teacher, writer and poet

Kate Harrington, born Rebecca Harrington Smith and later known as Rebecca Smith Pollard, was an American teacher, writer and poet.

== Biography ==
She was born in Allegheny, Pennsylvania on September 20, 1831. She spent her most productive years in Iowa. Her father, Prof. Nathaniel Ruggles Smith, was a playwright and an authority on Shakespeare, whose interpretations gained the attention of both Edwin Forrest and John Wilkes Booth. Her father's work on public presenting became the basis for Samuel Kirkham's English Grammar, which proved very influential on Abraham Lincoln. She was married to New York City poet and editor Oliver I. Taylor. Harrington was the anonymous author of Emma Bartlett, or Prejudice and Fanaticism, a fictional reply to Uncle Tom’s Cabin, intended to expose the hypocrisy of Know-Nothingism.

Harrington’s family moved to Ohio, then Kentucky, where Harrington worked as a teacher. Later, she taught in Chicago. Harrington lived in various Iowa cities, including Farmington, Keosauqua, Burlington, Ft. Madison and Keokuk. She began her writing career with the Louisville Journal, whose editor opposed secession. Samuel Clemens would later recall "setting up" the type for some of her poems published in his brother's newspaper office.

In her Letters from a Prairie Cottage, Harrington included a children's corner with tales about taming and raising animals and of a cat who adopted orphan chicks. Harrington also wrote other children’s books, including a primer and a speller. Pollard's work in the field of reading represented a pioneer effort in terms of creating a sequential reading program of intensive synthetic phonics, complete with a separate teacher's manual and spelling and reading books, and moving into a broad based graded series of literature readers.

Her series is important for its high correlation of spelling and reading instruction, for its concern for the interests of children, for its incorporation of music into the process of learning to read, and as the forerunner for other phonics systems. Her readers were used in every state in the Union and were still in use in Keokuk, Iowa, as late as 1937. Few women have single-handedly contributed so much to the field of reading.

In 1869, she published a book of poems entitled Maymie, as a tribute to her ten-year-old daughter who died that year.

Emma Bartlett received mixed reviews when it was published in 1856. The Ohio Statesman gave her a very good review but the Cincinnati Times said, "We have read this book. We pronounce the plot an excellent one and the style charming, but she has failed to fulfill the intended mission of the book." It accused her of also showing prejudice and fanaticism typical of the politicians that she tried to defend.

In 1870, Harrington published In Memoriam, Maymie, April 6th, 1869, a meditation on death and suffering, written on the occasion of the death of Harrington's young daughter.

In 1876, Harrington published Centennial, and Other Poems, to commemorate the one hundredth anniversary of the Declaration of Independence, and the Centennial Exposition in Philadelphia, the first official World's Fair to be held in the United States. The volume included many poems about Iowa, as well as selected poems of Harrington's father, Prof. N.R. Smith, and illustrations of the Centennial grounds in Philadelphia.

Kate Harrington, or Rebecca Harrington Smith Pollard wrote all of her life. She was 79 years old when she produced the poem, "Althea" or "Morning Glory," which relates to Iowa. She died in Ft. Madison on May 29, 1917. She was interred in Farmington, Van Buren County, Iowa.

== Bibliography ==
- Harrington, Kate (1876). Centennial and Other Poems. Kessinger Publishing. ISBN 978-0-548-43372-0.
