= Mark W. Balmert =

U.S. Navy rear admiral

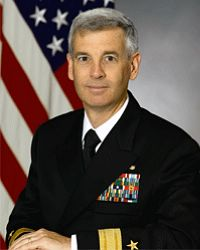
- Born: 1954 (age 71–72); Fort Madison, Iowa
- Military career
- Allegiance: United States of America
- Branch: United States Navy
- Service years: 1977–2008
- Rank: Rear admiral
- Commands: Expeditionary Strike Group 3 Destroyer Squadron 7 USS Chandler
- Conflicts: Operation Enduring Freedom; Operation Iraqi Freedom
- Awards: Legion of Merit (5); Bronze Star
- Other work: Northrop Grumman, Strategic Senior Consulting Manager

Mark William Balmert (born 1954) is retired United States Navy rear admiral. His last command was the joint Navy and Marine Corps Expeditionary Strike Group 3. He retired from the Navy in 2008 and joined Northrop Grumman as a Strategic Senior Consulting Manager.

== Biography ==
=== Early years; education ===
Balmert was born in Fort Madison, Iowa. He participated in the Navy Reserve Officer Training program (NROTC) at the University of Notre Dame, and graduated in 1977 with a Bachelor of Science degree in chemical engineering. He earned a Master of Science in financial management from the Naval Postgraduate School in 1985. He is a 1989 graduate of the Armed Forces Staff College He also attended the National Securities Management Course at the Maxwell School of Citizenship at Syracuse University.

=== United States Navy career ===
Balmert was commissioned as an ensign in December 1977 through the NROTC program. He attended Surface Warfare Officers School and then began his first sea assignment in 1978 aboard the USS Lynde McCormick (DDG-8). He served as the engineering officer aboard the USS Fife (DD-991) from 1986 to 1988, and aboard the USS Merrill (DD-976) as executive officer from 1991 to 1992. CDR Balmert commanded USS Chandler (DDG-996) from 7 August 1996 to 18 December 1998, winning the Battle Efficiency Award, and Destroyer Squadron 7 during Operation Enduring Freedom and Operation Iraqi Freedom as sea combat commander for the Constellation Battle Group.

Shore assignments include naval plans officer at Headquarters, United Nations Command and Combined Forces Command in Seoul, Korea; Surface Commander Assignments Branch head in Millington, Tennessee; chief of staff for Commander Naval Surface Force U.S. Pacific Fleet; director, Operations Division, Office of Budget in the Office of the Assistant Secretary of the Navy (Financial Management/ Comptroller) and director, Operations Division, Fiscal Management Division in the Office of the Chief of Naval Operations.

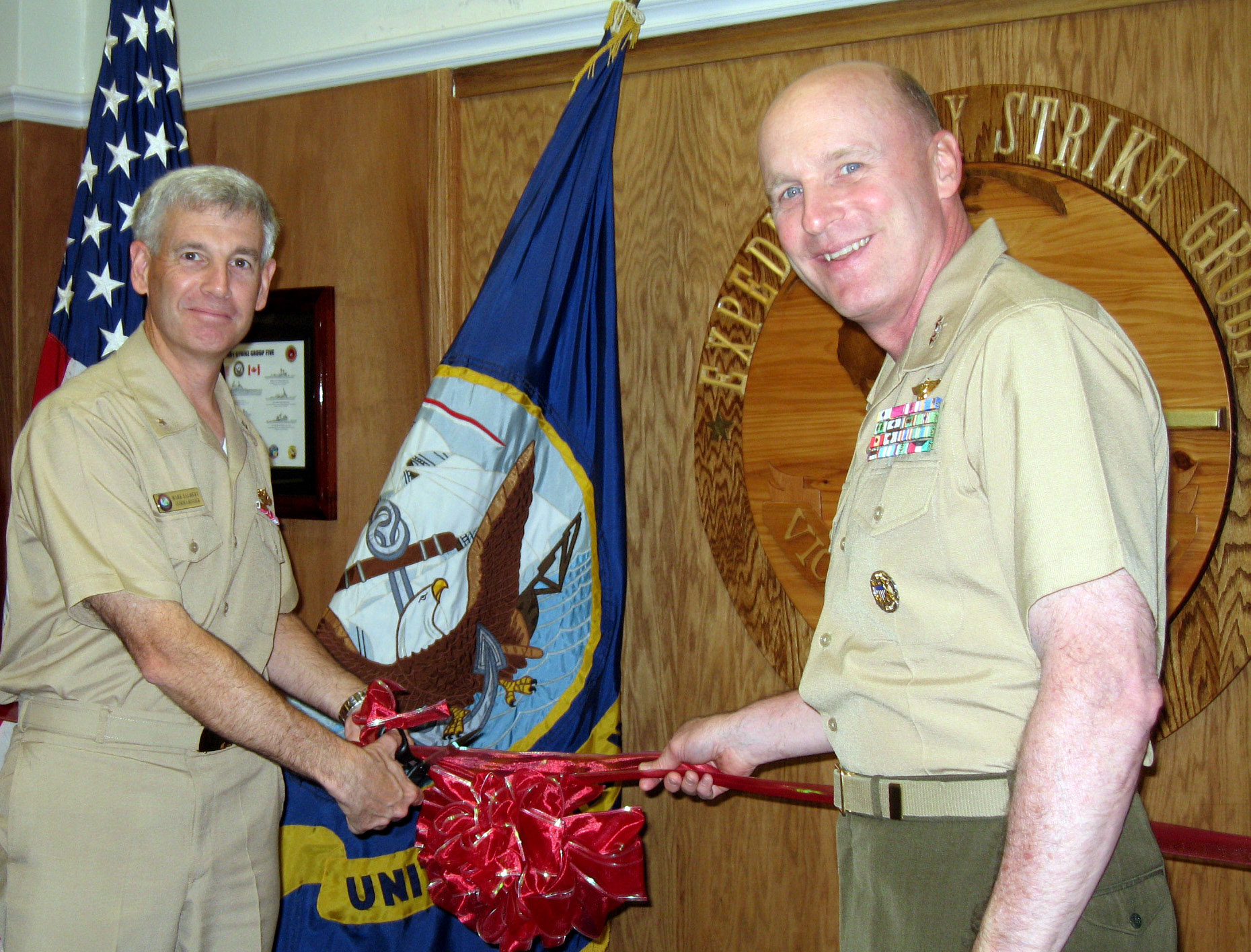
Ribbon cutting for ESG 3, RDML Balmert (left) and MajGen Carl Jensen, USMC (right), April 2007

Balmert also served as chief staff officer of Destroyer Squadron 13; assistant surface operations officer for Commander 7th Fleet; flag secretary for Commander 3rd Fleet; operations officer for Commander Cruiser-Destroyer Group 1; Commander Expeditionary Strike Group 5; and as Commander Expeditionary Strike Group 3. He was succeeded as commander for ESG3 on May 22, 2008 by Rear Admiral Kendall L. Card. RDML Balmert's final assignment was as commander, Amphibious Group Three.

Balmert was nominated for promotion to the rank of rear admiral (lower half) in April 2004.

He retired from the U.S. Navy in 2008.

=== Military awards and decorations ===
RDML Balmert's personal decorations include the Legion of Merit with four Gold Stars, the Bronze Star, the Defense Meritorious Service Medal, the Meritorious Service Medal with two Gold Stars, the Navy Commendation Medal with three Gold Stars, and the Joint Service Achievement Medal.

- Legion of Merit with four Gold Stars
- Bronze Star
- Defense Meritorious Service Medal
- Meritorious Service Medal with two Gold Stars
- Navy and Marine Corps Commendation Medal with three Gold Stars
- Joint Service Achievement Medal

=== Post-military career ===
In July 2008, Balmert joined Northrop Grumman Corporation as a Strategic Senior Consulting Manager of Northrop Grumman Shipbuilding. Balmert currently serves as the President of the San Diego Military Advisory Council. https://sdmac.org/about/mark-balmert/
