= James Theodore Richmond =

James Theodore (Ted) Richmond
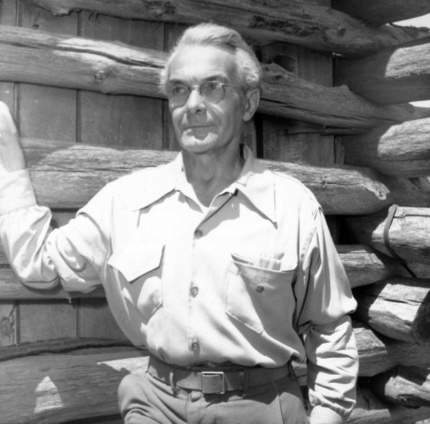
- 'Twilight' Ted Richmond
- Born: James Theodore Richmond; May 26, 1890; Ogallala, Nebraska
- Died: December 3, 1975; Texarkana, Texas
- Other name: "Twilight Ted"
- Education: University of Chicago, Université de Toulouse and Missouri State University
- Occupations: writer, conservationist, non-denominational preacher, and librarian
- Spouse: Edna Garner
- Parent(s): Albert and Etta Richmond

James Theodore (Ted) Richmond also known as "Twilight Ted" (May 26, 1890 – December 3, 1975) was an American writer, conservationist, non-denominational preacher, and noted librarian.

== Background ==
Richmond was born the second of five sons of a pioneer physician, Albert and Etta Richmond in Ogallala, Nebraska. In 1894 after years of drought, the family moved to Fort Madison, Iowa. In Iowa Richmond became fascinated with outdoor life and would often travel around with migrant workers listening to their stories and preaching the Gospel. Richmond was active in the Boy Scouts of America and started many Scout troops in his travels around the Midwest.

Seeking a greater education, Richmond traveled to Chicago and attended school at the University of Chicago for a period of time.

== World War I ==
Richmond joined the (AEF) American Expeditionary Force and was stationed in France during World War I. After the war, he stayed in France and spent one year attending the University of Toulouse. During that time period, he also helped establish one of the many libraries at the University.

== Chicago newspaperman ==
After returning to the United States after World War I, Richmond worked as a newspaperman and wrote radio plays. After several years he grew disenchanted with the life of the big city and its focus on material possessions. Having spent much of his youth being involved with the Boy Scouts and his love of the outdoors, he read the story "The Shepherd of the Hills" by Harold Bell Wright and an article by Horace Kephart about camping in the Ozarks. These books greatly influenced him and he decided to give up the big city life and find himself again in the hills of the Boston Mountains in Arkansas.

Richmond migrated to Springfield, Missouri, in the Missouri Ozarks. While in Springfield, he continued his education and attended what is now known as Missouri State University.

== Ozark life and the Boston Mountains ==
In 1931, Richmond relocated to Mount Sherman, Arkansas, and homesteaded 160 acres (0.65 km^{2}) land located on the north slope, in what he called "the cove". He built a cabin which he lovingly called the "Wildcat Cabin" because of the bobcat that followed him on his journey to locate a suitable building site.

Richmond immediately formed a kinship with the native Arkansans. Richmond was a worldly man in a land that saw very little of the outside world. He began several quests that were dear to his heart, doctoring and education. He began writing people describing his need for books and magazines that offered reading material of the hill folks.

== Later years ==
Richmond married Edna Garner, Chief Deputy Clerk of the Courts of Civil Appeals of the 6th Supreme Judicial District Court of Texas at Texarkana, in 1953. They lived in Texarkana and Richmond would spend summers on Mount Sherman in Arkansas tending to his Wilderness Library.

Richmond died in a nursing home in Texarkana, Texas, at the age of 85. He is buried in a Texarkana, Texas cemetery.
