= John Van Valkenburg =

Canadian-born American lawyer and politician

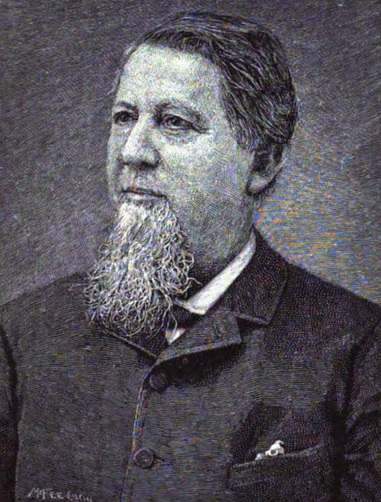
- Born: John Van Valkenburg; April 6, 1832; St. George, Ontario, Upper Canada
- Died: October 15, 1890 (aged 58); Fort Madison, Iowa, United States
- Occupation: Lawyer

John Van Valkenburg (April 6, 1832 – October 15, 1890) was a Canadian-born American lawyer and politician active in Iowa. Van Valkenburg was the Supreme Chancellor of the World of the Knights of Pythias from 1884 to 1886, and was the author of the standard works of Pythianism. He was also a leader in the Odd Fellows.

== Biography ==
Van Valkenburg came to Iowa with his parents when he was nine years old. The family settled on a farm in Lee County in 1846. After attending a preparatory school, he entered Oberlin College, but continued his education at Knox College, Galesburg, Illinois, where he graduated. After completing his studies, he was elected principal of the State Normal School of Iowa. He held this position for one year. At the end of this period he chose the law as his profession and joined the firm of Goudy, Waite & Jamieson in Chicago. He was admitted to the bar on 15 October 1857, and practiced law in Fort Madison, Iowa, from the following July until a week before his death. He was a Republican, a district presidential elector in 1864, an elector-at-large in 1876, and a district elector again in 1884. He was a candidate for the congressional nomination in 1874, but was defeated by George W. McCrary.

Van Valkenburg was a prominent member of the I. O. O. F. (Odd Fellows). He was initiated at Fort Madison Lodge on 22 January 1868. He was elected Grand Master of the Order in Iowa in 1880, Grand Representative to the Sovereign Grand Lodge the following June, and was re-elected Grand Representative in June 1884. He was a charter member of Gem City Lodge, No. 21, Knights of Pythias, of Fort Madison, and was its first Vice Chancellor. He was elected Grand Chancellor of Iowa in 1875 and re-elected two years later. He was elected Supreme Chancellor of the World, the highest office in the Order, on 23 April 1884 at the Supreme Lodge meeting in New Orleans, Louisiana, and served in that capacity until July 1886.

== Writings ==
- Valkenburg, John Van (1886). The Knights of Pythias Complete Manual and Text-book. Memento Publishing Company.
- Valkenburg, John Van (1889). The Jewels of Pythian Knighthood. Pettibone Manufacturing Company.
