= Brown and Sharpe Manufacturing Company Complex =

- Brown & Sharpe Manufacturing Company Complex
- U.S. National Register of Historic Places
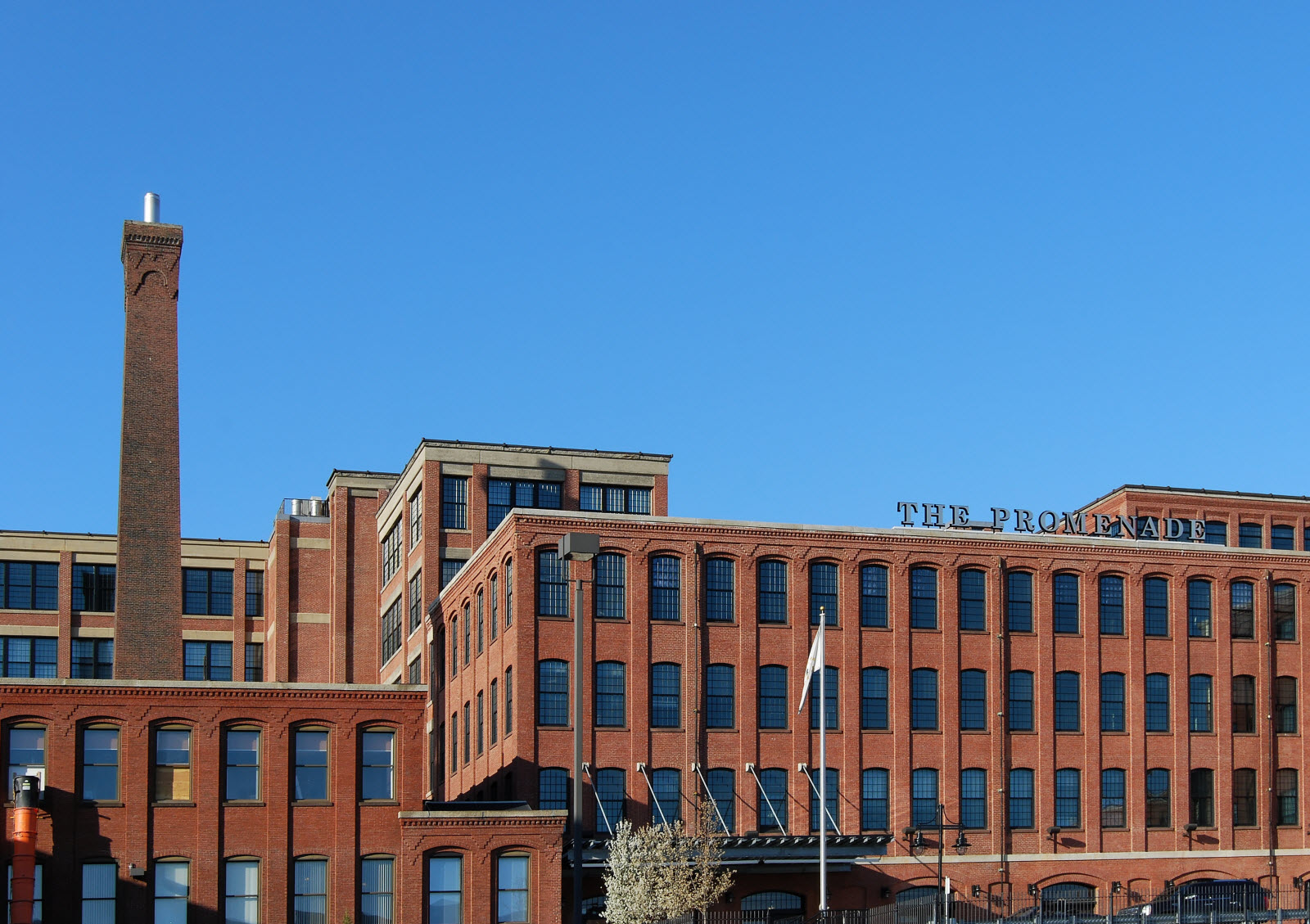

- Location within Rhode Island Location within the United States
- Location: Providence, Rhode Island
- Coordinates: 41.82984°N 71.42016°W
- Area: 25 acres (10 ha)
- Built: 1872
- Architect: Thomas McFarlane, Frederick Howe
- NRHP reference No.: 03000081
- Added to NRHP: April 18, 2003

The Brown & Sharpe Manufacturing Company Complex (also known as Darling, Brown & Sharpe; Capital Industrial Center; The Foundry) is a historic factory complex in Providence, Rhode Island along the Woonasquatucket River. The 25-acre (10 ha) complex occupies most of a large city block bounded on the south by Promenade Street, the west by Bath and Calverly Streets, the north by West Park Street, and the east by Interstate 95. The complex was the longtime home of Brown & Sharpe Manufacturing Company, a manufacturer of precision equipment founded in 1833. The company was originally located in downtown Providence, but moved to this site in 1872, where it remained until 1964, when it moved to North Kingstown. Fourteen of the company's buildings survive.

== History ==
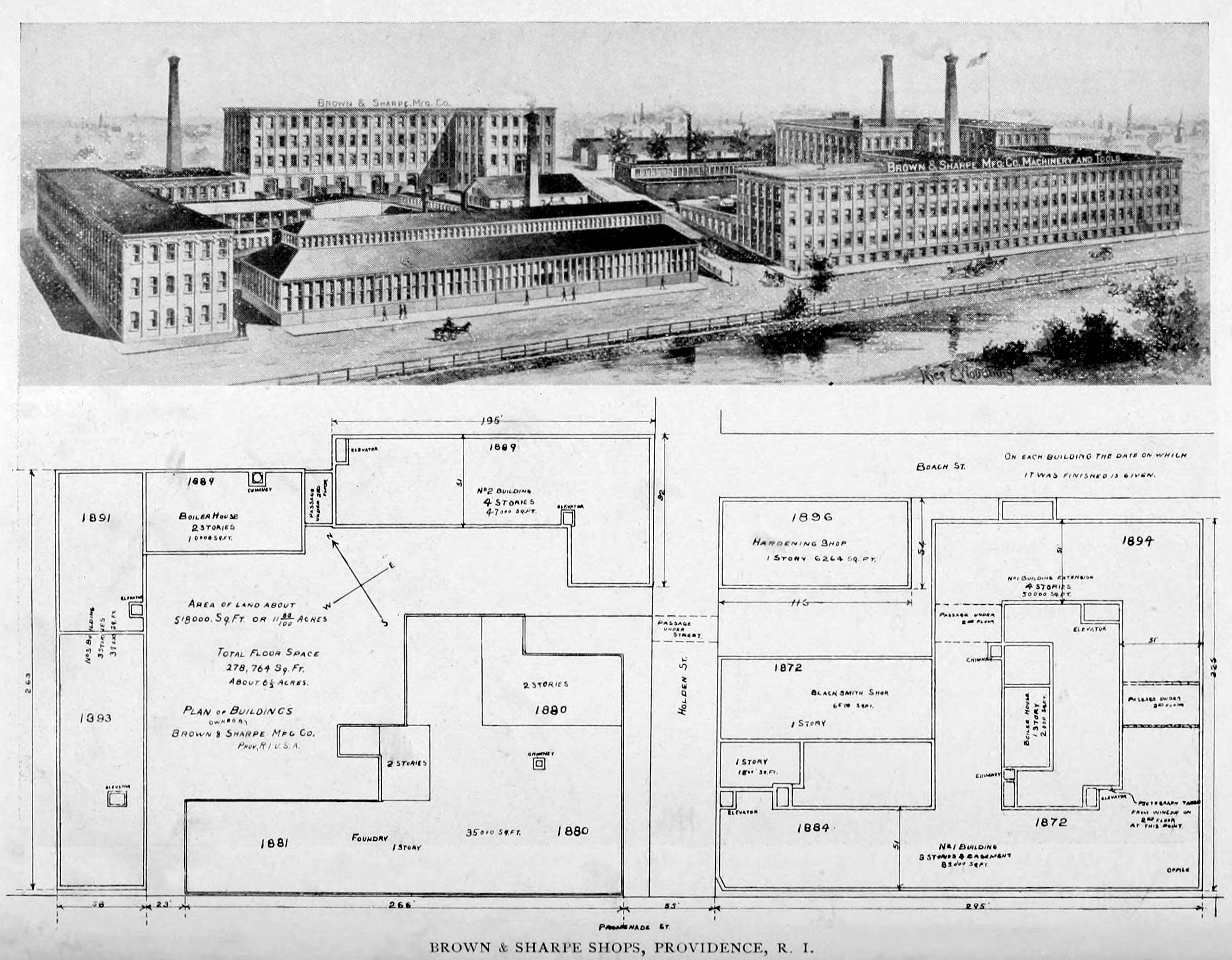
Brown & Sharpe Manufacturing Company Complex, 1896

The first building was designed in 1872 by Brown & Sharpe employee Thomas McFarlane. It was a huge 66,000 square-foot structure made of brick, cast iron, and concrete, and held space for all the company's functions. Over the years, more buildings were built on what was then a 33-acre parcel (later cut to 25 acres when I-95 was built), including a carpenter shop, powerhouse, machine shops, warehouses, grinding shop, and steel storage bins. The complex was largely complete by 1920, although the last structure was built in 1941.

The company remained in the location until 1964, when it was sold for $3.2 million. The property was sold again in 1986 to Foundry Associates.

The complex was listed on the National Register of Historic Places in 2003.

=== The Foundry ===
Starting in 2004, the Brown & Sharpe complex began renovations into rental units. The space re-opened as The Foundry, a mix of residential loft apartments and office space. The Foundry encompasses 26 acres and 13 restored buildings. The last apartments in the complex were completed in 2015.

In 2016, the A. T. Cross Company, maker of writing instruments and pens, moved its headquarters from Lincoln, Rhode Island to 299 Promenade Street at The Foundry.

== See also ==
- National Register of Historic Places listings in Providence, Rhode Island
- Brown & Sharpe
