= Brown & Sharpe =

Swedish machine tool builder

Brown & Sharpe is a division of Hexagon AB, a Swedish multinational corporation focused mainly on metrological tools and technology. During the 19th and 20th centuries, Brown & Sharpe was one of the best-known and most influential machine tool builders and was a leading manufacturer of instruments for machinists (such as micrometers and indicators). Its reputation and influence were such that its name is often considered to be inseparably paired with certain industrial standards that it helped establish, including:

- The American wire gauge (AWG) standards for wire;
- The Brown & Sharpe taper in machine tool spindle tapers; and
- The Brown & Sharpe worm threadform for worm gears.

Since being acquired by Hexagon Metrology in 2001, Brown and Sharpe has concentrated exclusively on metrology equipment.

== History ==
=== Founding (1833) and early years ===
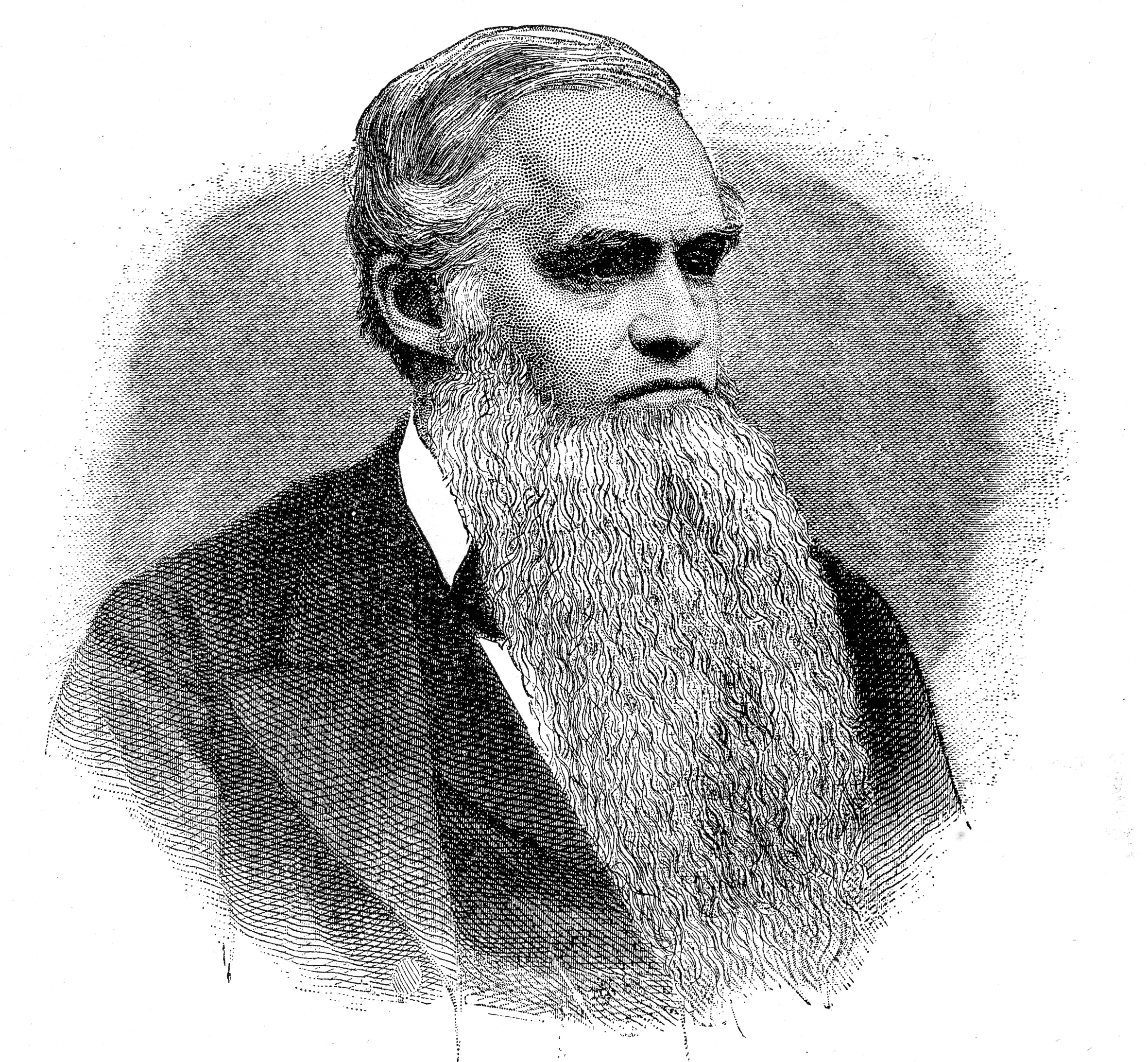
Joseph R. Brown, 1886 engraving.

Brown & Sharpe was founded in 1833 on South Main Street in Providence, Rhode Island by David Brown and his son Joseph R. Brown. The elder Brown retired in 1841, and the younger Brown formed a partnership with Lucian Sharpe in 1853, giving the company its name.

The early years saw many innovations and inventions, including the first automatic machine for graduating rules (1850) and the precision Gear Cutting and Dividing Engine (1855).

The company was incorporated in 1868. In 1866 Samuel Darling joined the partnership and the firm changed its name to Darling, Brown and Sharpe until Darling's interest was bought out in 1892.

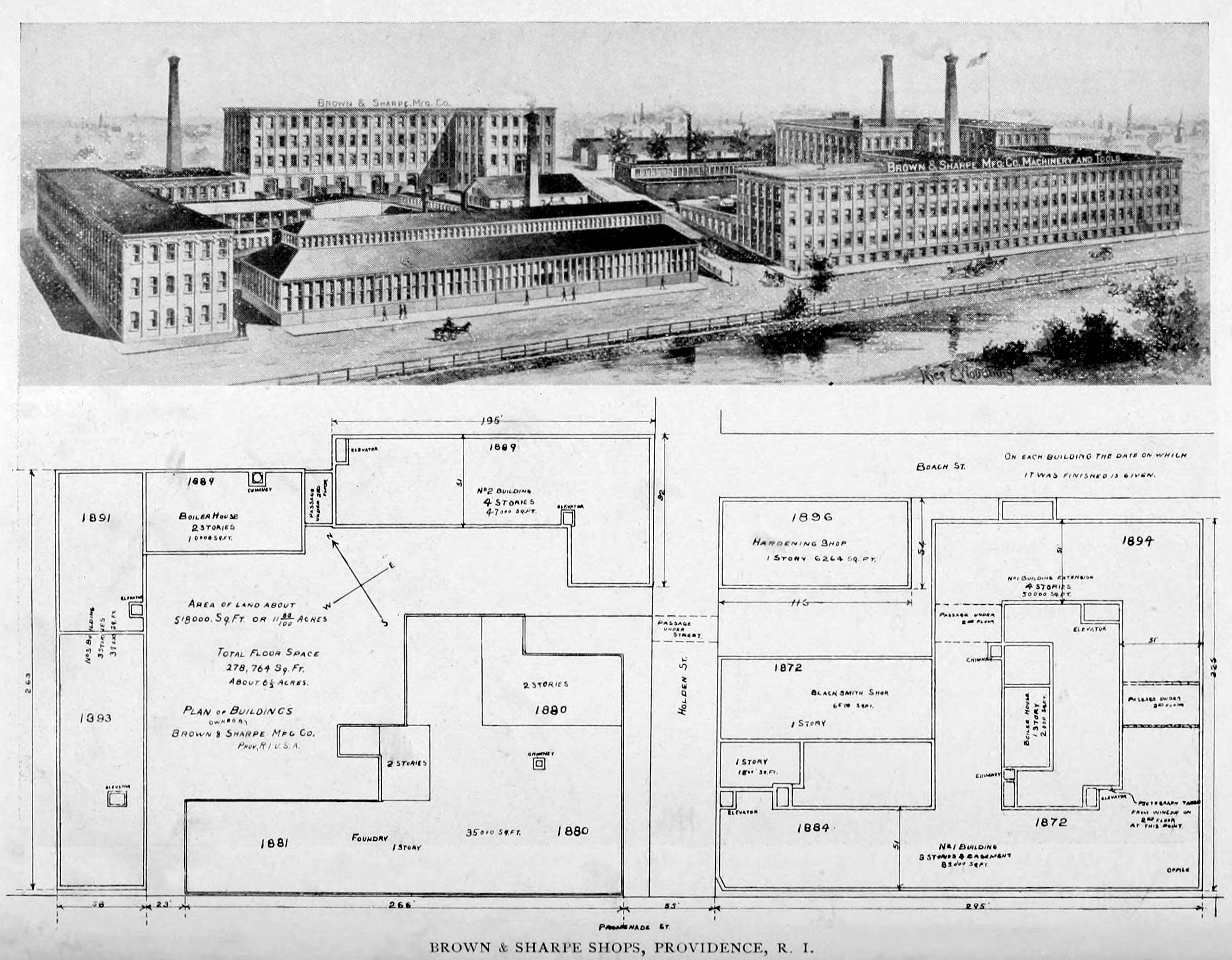
Browns & Sharpe Shops, Providence RI, 1896

=== Growth and expansion ===
In 1872, the company moved from Main Street to a 33-acre parcel along the Woonasquatucket River in the Smith Hill neighborhood of Providence. The first building was designed in 1872 by Brown & Sharpe employee Thomas McFarlane. It was a huge 66,000 square-foot structure made of brick, cast iron, and concrete, and held space for all the company's functions. Over the years, more buildings were built, including a carpenter shop, powerhouse, machine shops, warehouses, grinding shop, and steel storage bins. By the early 1900s, Brown & Sharpe was the world's largest manufacturer of machine tools, operating out of the sprawling Brown and Sharpe Manufacturing Company Complex.

Brown & Sharpe was instrumental in the development of machine tools and machining technology (including toolmaking, metrology, production, etc.). It was responsible for the improvement and wider dissemination of milling machines, micrometers, turret lathes, screw machines, and other tools. A thorough account of the details is given in a seminal classic of machine tool history, Joseph W. Roe's English and American Tool Builders (1916).

=== World War I through World War II ===
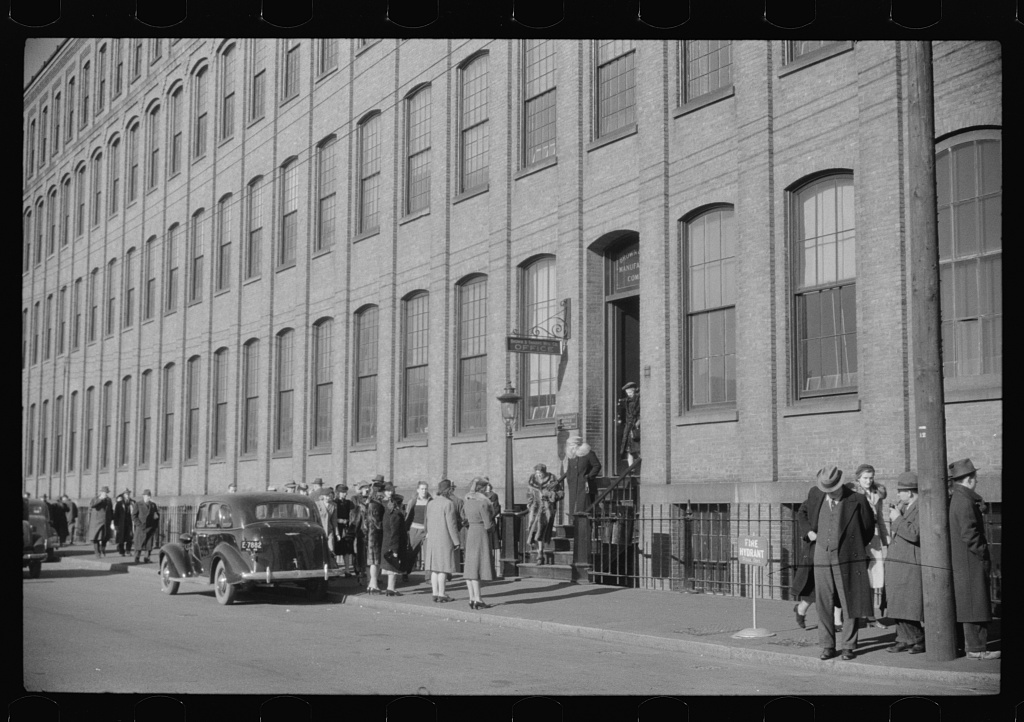
Employees leaving Brown and Sharpe Manufacturing Company, December 1940. Photo by Jack Delano.

Like most machine tool builders, Brown & Sharpe rode a business cycle rollercoaster during these decades. After being kept very busy during World War I, builders suffered a slump in the post–World War I recession and depression of 1920–21. The Roaring Twenties brought renewed sales, but then the Great Depression slashed them. The armament-buildup period of 1936 to 1940 again renewed machine tool activity, and then the World War II material effort exploded demand, pushing it to record heights.

Brown and Sharpe machine tools were a mainstay of American metal manufacturing until the late 20th Century and could be found in most machine shops and factories which worked with metal. Additionally, Brown and Sharpe made calipers and micrometers which were essential to products built to fine tolerances.

=== Post-World War II era ===
Shortly after World War II, Henry D. Sharpe Jr. succeeded his father as president of Brown & Sharpe Manufacturing Company. He led its development as a modern company designed to last. The firm stopped producing its old stalwarts: sewing machines, hair clippers, and certain categories of machine tools (including its line of milling machines). Instead the company refocused on the mass production of automatic screw machines as it completed a three-year, $4 million refitting program for its Providence plant in 1957. In keeping with the latest management theories, Sharpe also reorganized the company into separate divisions, with each one responsible for its own profit and loss. During this era, Brown & Sharpe began to experiment with international expansion, and the company established its first overseas subsidiary in Plymouth, England, in 1955. Between 1957 and 1961 the company further expanded through the acquisition of related manufacturers, most notably the machine-producing Double A Products Company.

In the aftermath of these changes and expansion, the company outgrew its central plant just west of downtown Providence. In 1964, Brown & Sharpe followed other Providence-based manufacturers out of the city, moving instead to suburban North Kingstown, Rhode Island. Such relocations were aided by the federal subsidies for highway construction and the rapid expansion in automobile ownership in the postwar era; Providence's suburbs developed throughout the 1950s. As the company's workers had become more mobile and the majority had moved to suburban areas, Brown & Sharpe decided to build a new facility on land cheaper than downtown. The new plant, dubbed Precision Park as a nod to Brown & Sharpe's history of pioneering manufacture of precise measurement tools, contained 700,000 square feet (65,000 m^{2}) of easily adaptable floor space. Unlike the old Providence facility, Precision Park was built as one story. This enabled the efficient horizontal movement of materials preferred in modern manufacturing, an improvement over the vertical circulation system of its former multistory plant.

While the company never again reached its wartime peak employment of 11,000, it still employed 3,394 workers in 1976. Company management had a policy of working to smooth production across the recessions of the 1970s and keep employment steady. During this time, President Sharpe and his successor Don Roach sympathized with the workers, who were concerned about job security at a time of reduction in industrial jobs and the cyclical nature of machine-tool manufacturing.

Despite these policies, Brown & Sharpe management made other demands of its workers and union leaders. In 1981, President Don Roach insisted that the company be able to shift machinists between jobs as needed, but many workers worried that they would lose traditional seniority privileges. In response, 1,600 union workers, members of the International Association of Machinists District Lodge 64, walked out on their jobs in what would become the longest-lasting strike in the nation's history. It was also characterized as one of the most antagonistic in recent memory. The strike's hostility transcended the debate over the company's labor policy. It prompted questions among management about the future of the Rhode Island work force.

On March 22, 1982, some 800 picketers clashed with members of the state and local police forces, who used tear gas to control the strikers. Governor J. Joseph Garrahy publicly apologized for the actions of the police, which appeared unduly severe to many Rhode Island residents. Although the strike legally continued after the tear-gas incident, the picket line largely disbanded. Many workers decided to move to other companies or work. In 1998, nearly seventeen years after the strike began, the Rhode Island Supreme Court ruled on an appeal in the legal battle, saying that Brown & Sharpe had not illegally forced the strike. By this point, both Brown & Sharpe and its erstwhile work force were retreating from manufacturing in Rhode Island.

During the long legal proceedings, Brown & Sharpe continued to change as a manufacturer and as an employer. During the 1980s and 1990s, the company concentrated on developing coordinate-measuring machines (CMMs), devices for dimensional measuring, as a more modern and larger progression to their established micrometers. The company began to lose money as it shifted production away from machine tools and toward advanced metrology equipment, losing $14.6 million in 1990. By 1993, employment in North Kingstown had fallen to 700, compared with 2,000 in 1982 and more than 3,500 in 1976. In 1994 Brown & Sharpe acquired DEA of Italy, an established manufacturer of CMMs.

In 2001, substantially all of the assets of the Brown & Sharpe Manufacturing Company, including the intellectual property, designs, trademarks, facilities and inventory, were acquired by Hexagon AB, although it did not acquire the Brown & Sharpe Manufacturing Company. The Brown & Sharpe brand of measurement products is manufactured by the Hexagon Metrology division of Hexagon AB, which retained many of the key individuals from the former Brown & Sharpe company. Since the acquisition, Brown & Sharpe-brand hand tools have been manufactured by Hexagon Metrology's TESA division in Switzerland.

== See also ==
- Brown and Sharpe Manufacturing Company Complex
