= CrossPad =

Electronic notepad

- Type: Digitizing Tablet (Computing Input Device)
- Released: Announced 1997-11; Shipped 1998-03
- Discontinued: 2001-04

The CrossPad is an electronic notepad product introduced in 1997 by American fountain pen manufacturer A. T. Cross Company and IBM. The special pen contains a small radio transmitter which tells the pad where it is written. To provide the user with feedback on where it is written, the pen also contains ink and the user write on writing paper placed on top of the CrossPad. There is a small display at the bottom of the device that provides feedback about commands given, and there are six buttons which can be activated using the special pen.

In September 1998, the Cross Company released a smaller version of the original CrossPad, called the CrossPad XP.

The CrossPad and CrossPad XP never achieved the market success that the Cross Company and IBM hoped for, and the product was ultimately discontinued in April, 2001. A class action suit resulted from the failure of the product in the marketplace.

== See also ==
- IBM ThinkPad TransNote
