= Fort Madison, Iowa =

- City
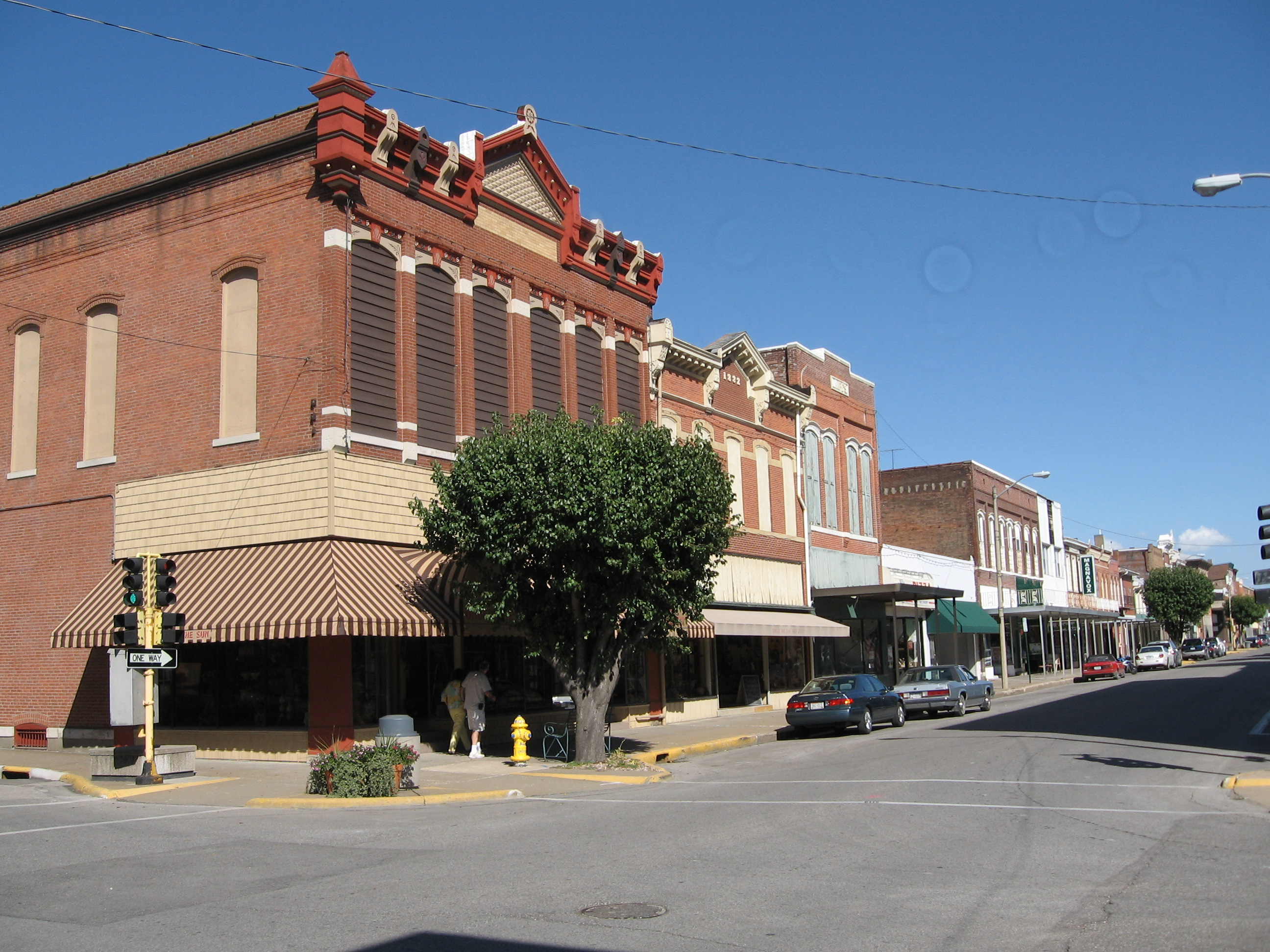
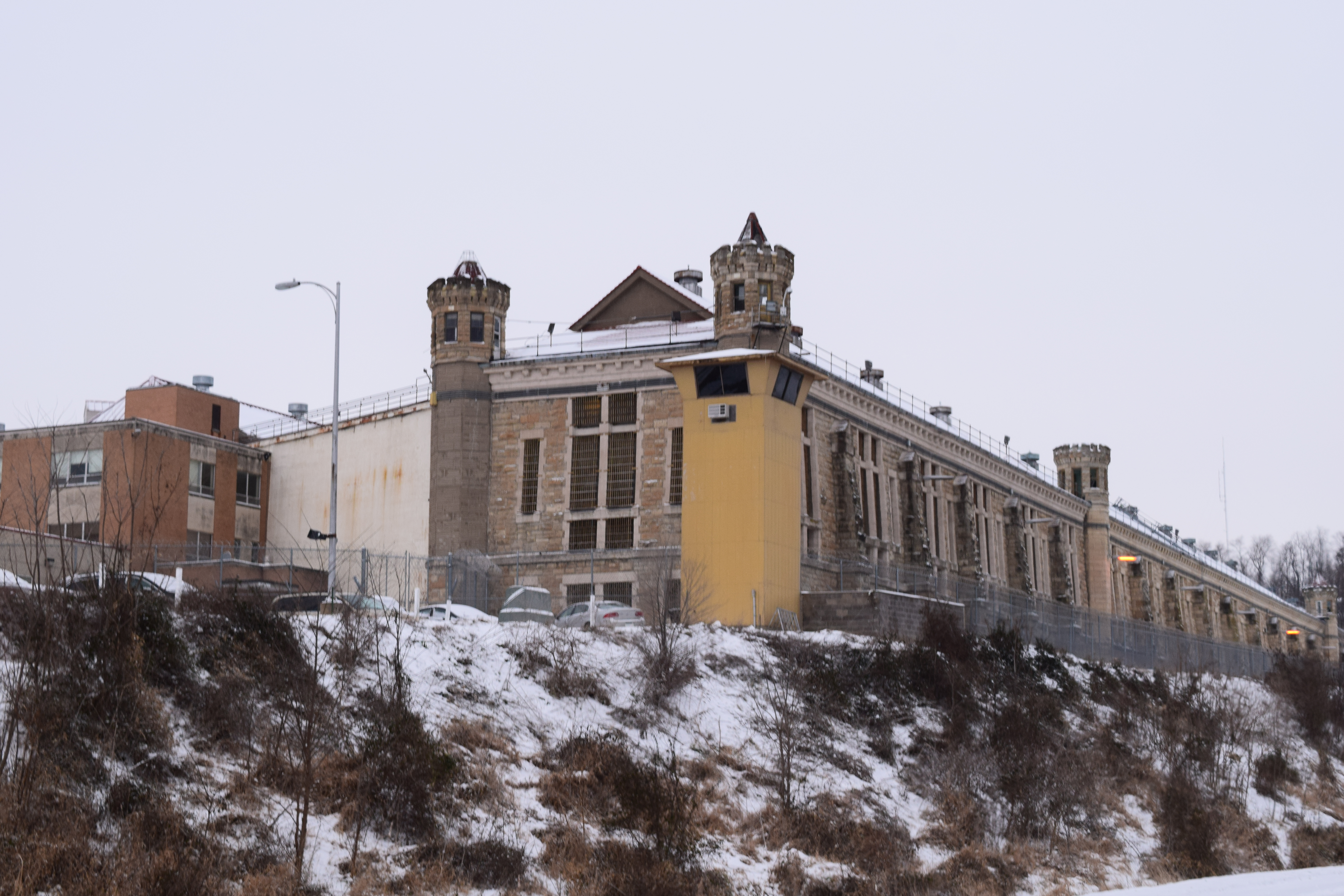
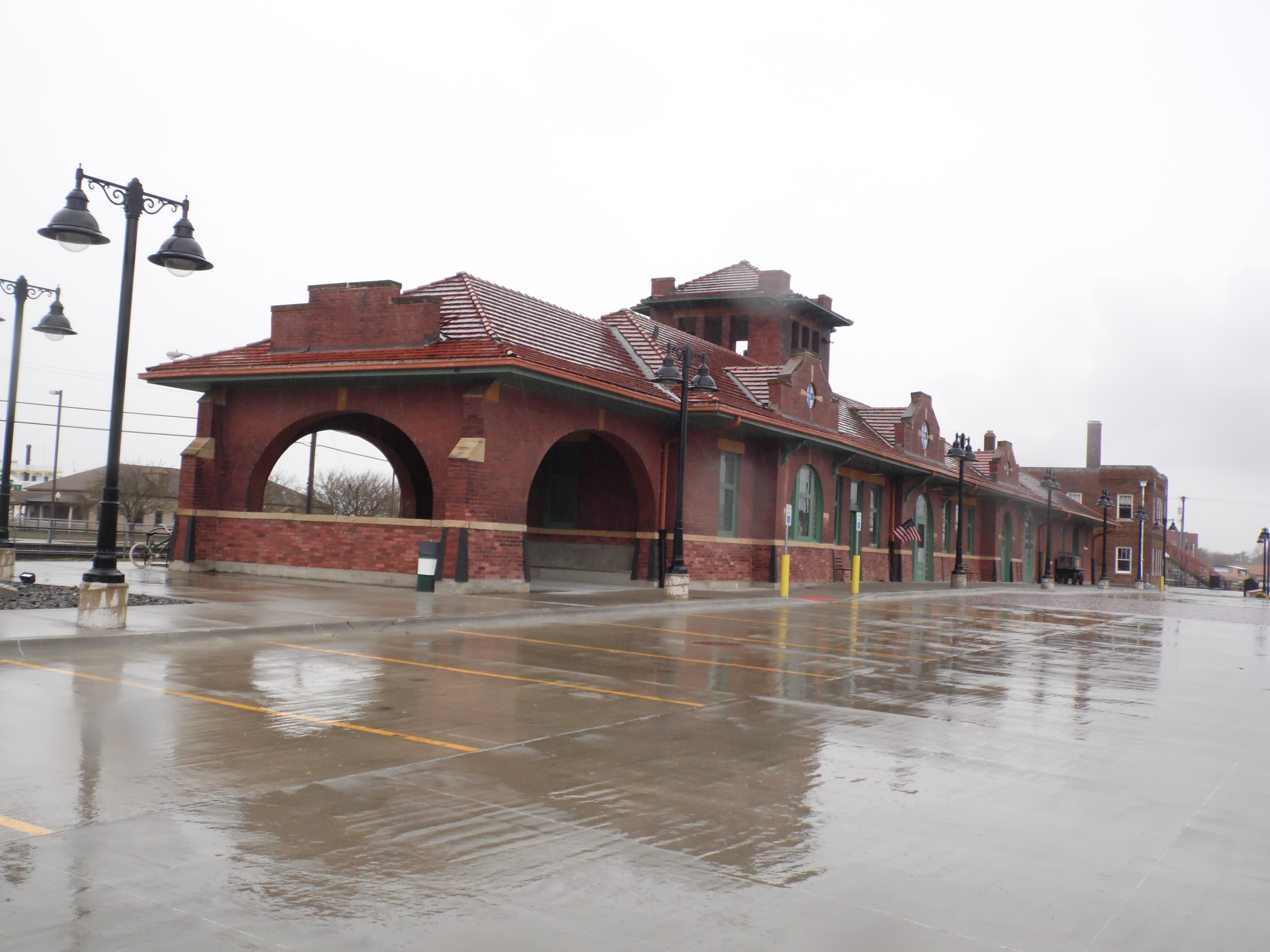
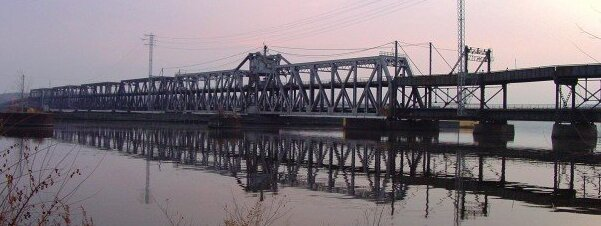
- Downtown Fort Madison Old Iowa State Penitentiary Fort Madison Amtrak Station Fort Madison Toll Bridge
- Motto: Always Moving
- Interactive map of Fort Madison, Iowa
- Location within Iowa
- Coordinates: 40.6215°N 91.3463°W
- Country: United States
- State: Iowa
- County: Lee
- Founded: 1838
- Incorporated: January 19, 1838
- Named after: James Madison

Government
  - Type: Mayor–council
  - Mayor: Melinda Blind
  - City Council (Wards): 1st: Rick Thele; 2nd: Angela Roller; 3rd: Jerry Sparrow; 4th: Nicole Merschman; 5th: Dustin Yager
  - At Large: Rusty Andrews; Matthew Emmett

Area
  - City: 13.247 sq mi (34.310 km^{2})
  - Land: 9.650 sq mi (24.993 km^{2})
  - Water: 3.597 sq mi (9.316 km^{2}) 27.15%
- Elevation: 522 ft (159 m)

Population (2020)
  - City: 10,270
  - Estimate (2025): 9,935
  - Density: 1,064/sq mi (410.9/km^{2})
  - Urban: 10,278
  - Metro: 32,306
- Time zone: UTC–6 (Central (CST))
  - Summer (DST): UTC–5 (CDT)
- ZIP Code: 52627
- Area code: 319
- FIPS code: 19-28605
- GNIS feature ID: 2394796
- Highways: IA 2, US 61
- Website: fortmadison-ia.com

Fort Madison is a city in and the county seat of Lee County, Iowa, United States along with Keokuk. Of Iowa's 99 counties, Lee County is the only one with two county seats. The population was 10,270 as of the 2020 census, and was estimated at 9,935 in 2025. Located along the Mississippi River in the state's southeast corner, it lies between small bluffs along one of the widest portions of the river. Fort Madison is also the home of the Iowa State Penitentiary.

== History ==
Fort Madison was founded as the location of the first U.S. military fort in the upper Mississippi region. A replica of the fort stands along the river. Sheaffer Pens were developed and made in Fort Madison for many years. The city is the location of the Iowa State Penitentiary—the state's maximum security prison for men. Fort Madison is the Mississippi river crossing and station stop for Amtrak's Southwest Chief. Fort Madison has one of two remaining double swing-span bridges on the Mississippi River, the Fort Madison Toll Bridge, the other being the Government Bridge in Rock Island, Illinois. It has a top level for cars and a similar level for trains; it is also the world's largest.

The Fort Madison Downtown Commercial Historic District is a collection of well-preserved historic storefronts from the late 19th century. Along with this is the Park-to-Park Residential Historic District. The Historic Park to Park District is a seven block long, three block wide section of homes that represent the Gothic, Victorian, and Tudor era. With a rich variety of architectural styles like Gothic Revival, Italianate, Second Empire, Eastlake Stick, Richardson Romanesque, Queen Anne, and Tudor. With two of the six parks within the District. It is on the National Historic Registry.

=== Original Fort Madison (1808–1813) ===
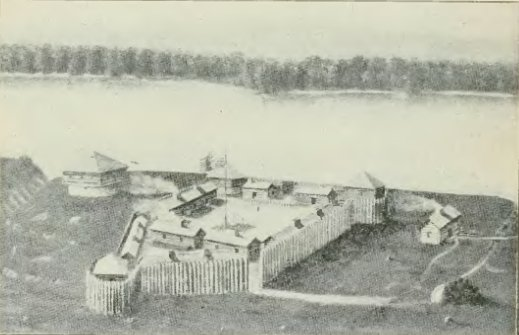
Fort Madison, built in 1808 (1903 artist's interpretation)

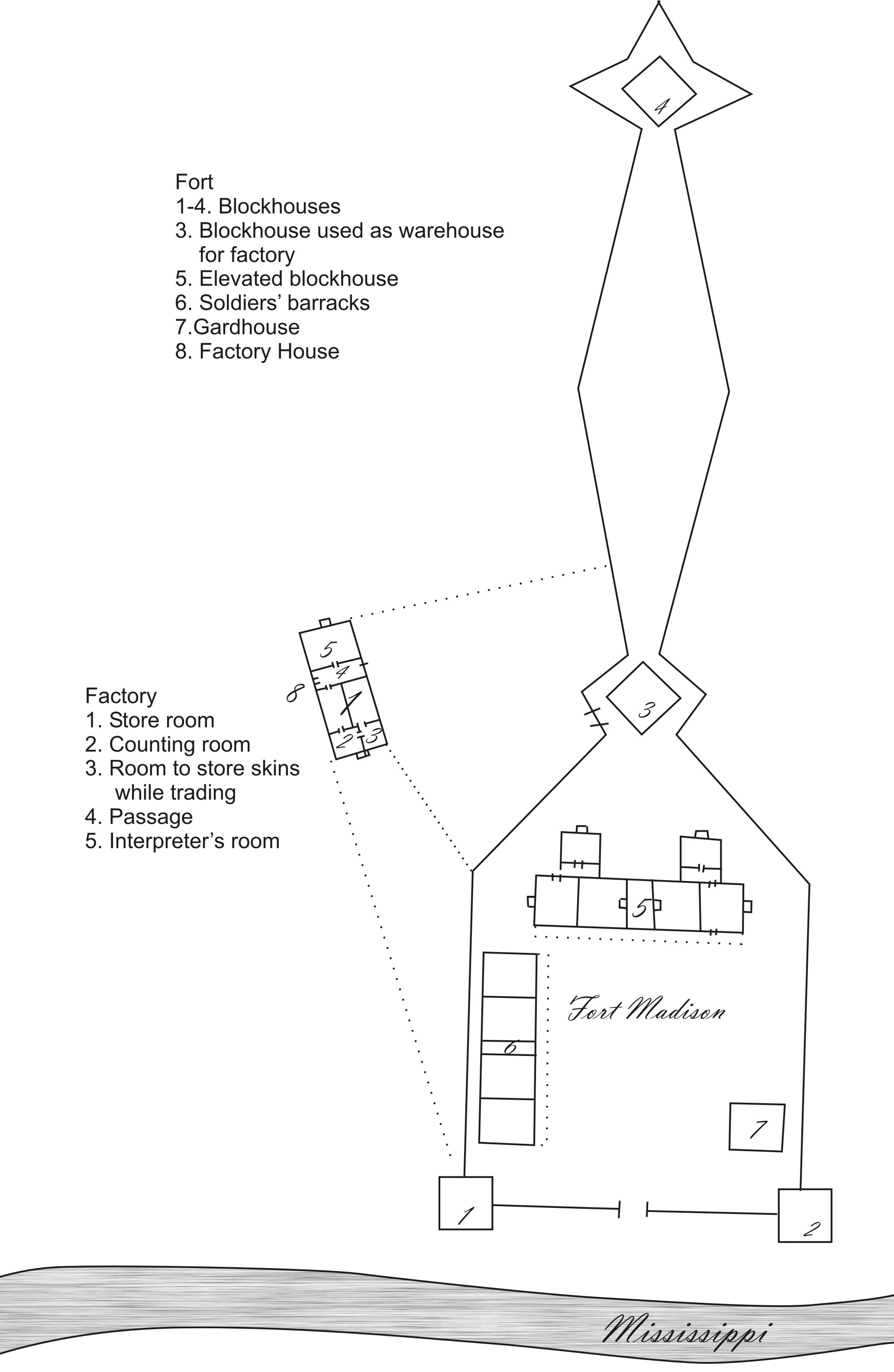
Plans of Fort Madison, drawn in 1810 by a trading post factor

The city of Fort Madison was established around the site of the historic Fort Madison (1808–1813), which was the first permanent U.S. military fortification on the Upper Mississippi. Fort Madison was the site of Black Hawk's first battle against U.S. troops, the only real War of 1812 battle fought west of the Mississippi. It was also the location of the first U.S. military cemetery in the upper Midwest. The fort was named for James Madison, fourth President of the United States.

Fort Madison was one of three posts established by the U.S. Army to establish control over the newly acquired Louisiana Purchase territories. Fort Madison was built to control trade and pacify Native Americans in the Upper Mississippi River region. The other two posts were Fort Belle Fontaine near St. Louis, which controlled the mouth of the Missouri, and Fort Osage, near what is now Kansas City, which controlled trade with western Native American tribes.

==== Location of the Fort ====
A disputed 1804 treaty with the Sauk and affiliated tribes led to the U.S. claim of control over western Illinois and parts of what is now Iowa. To establish control, the U.S. Army set out to construct a post near the mouth of the Des Moines River, a major trading route into the interior of Iowa. Not finding suitable land near the mouth of the Des Moines, the expedition also considered land near Quashquame's Sauk and Meskwaki village at the head of the Des Moines Rapids, a choke point of trade and transportation on the Upper Mississippi below modern Montrose. Again, this land was not considered suitable for a fort. The Army settled on a location several miles upstream at what is now the city of Fort Madison.

First called Fort Belleview, this post was also soon deemed inadequate. It was poorly situated at the base of a bluff next to a deep ravine, areas from which enemies could safely fire at the fort. Its construction led to resentment among the local Native Americans, especially the Sauk: They considered the 1804 treaty invalid, the fort threatened established trading networks, and American trade goods were considered inferior to French or British goods.

Black Hawk lamented over the new fort, and disparaged its construction in his autobiography.

==== Attacks on Fort Madison ====
Almost from the beginning, the fort was attacked by Sauk and other tribes. U.S. troops were harassed when they left the fort, and in April 1809, only threat of cannon fire stopped an attempted storming of the fort.

During its existence, several improvements were made to the fort, including reinforcing the stockade and making it higher, extending the fort to a nearby bluff to provide cover from below, and constructing of additional blockhouses outside the stockade. These improvements could not fully compensate for the fort's poor location, however, and it was again attacked in March 1812, and was the focus of a coordinated siege in the following September. The September siege was intense, and the fort was nearly overrun. Significant damage resulted to fort-related buildings, and the attack was only stopped when cannon fire destroyed a fortified Indian position. Black Hawk participated in the siege, and claimed to have personally shot down the fort's flag.

==== Final siege and abandonment ====
As the War of 1812 expanded to the frontier, British-allied Sauk and other tribes began a determined effort to push out the Americans and reclaim control of the upper Mississippi. Beginning in July 1813, attacks on troops outside the fort led to another siege. Conditions were so dangerous that the Army could not recover the bodies of soldiers killed outside the fort and troops could not leave the fort to collect firewood. The Army burned outbuildings to prevent them from falling into Indian hands.

After weeks of paralyzing siege, the Army finally abandoned the post, burning it as they evacuated. They retreated in the dark through a trench to the river, where they escaped on boats. The date of the abandonment is unknown, as much of the military correspondence from this period of the war is missing, but it probably happened in September. Black Hawk observed the ruins soon after. "We started in canoes, and descended the Mississippi, until we arrived near the place where Fort Madison had stood. It had been abandoned and burned by the whites, and nothing remained but the chimneys. We were pleased to see that the white people had retired from the country."

United States government had established a federal fur trade station at Fort Madison in 1808. It was burned down in 1812 by order of the military commander who feared that it would endanger the fort.

Three active battalions of the current 3rd Infantry (1–3 Inf, 2–3 Inf and 4-3 Inf) perpetuate the lineage of the old 1st Infantry Regiment, which had a detachment at Fort Madison.

==== Fort ruins and archaeology ====
Early settlers built their homes near the ruins and named the town that grew up around them for the fort. A large monument was erected in the early 20th century at the fort location. Archaeological excavations in the parking lot of the Sheaffer Pen Company factory in 1965 exposed the fort's central blockhouse and the foundations of officers' quarters. The site was listed on the National Register of Historic Places in 1973. A replica fort was built several blocks away; much of the labor was supplied by volunteer inmates at the nearby Iowa State Penitentiary.

==== Preservation and threats to the fort site ====
The fort site is now the subject of preservation efforts. After the Sheaffer Pen factory closed in 2007, the site was sold to developers. Arguing that Fort Madison is "Iowa's most important historical site", preservationists want to convert the parking lot into a memorial park dedicated to soldiers killed at the fort. So far, no agreement has been reached for its preservation.

=== Founding of the town of Fort Madison ===
The first settler at the ruins of the fort was General John Holly Knapp, who in 1832 bought a claim to some land of the fort and built the first building in the fall of the same year, utilized as an Indian Supply Store. Early next spring and his cousin Nathaniel Knapp with family settled there, joined by some other settlers the same year, In June 1835, General Knapp and Nathaniel Knapp, laid out the town of Fort Madison. Due to some land title issues, in 1840 the town was relocated on the same lot lines by the government.

== Geography ==
According to the United States Census Bureau, the city has an area of 13.247 square miles (34.31 km^{2}), of which 9.650 square miles (24.99 km^{2}) is land and 3.597 square miles (9.32 km^{2}) (27.15%) is water.

Fort Madison is famous for the Tri-State Rodeo, RiverFest, Mexican Fiesta, Balloons Over the Mississippi, Art in Central Park and Annual Lighted Parade.

Mississippi River as seen from Riverview Park. Fort Madison Toll Bridge is on the left.

=== Climate ===
Climate data for Fort Madison, Iowa (1991–2020 normals, extremes 1893–present)
Month	Jan	Feb	Mar	Apr	May	Jun	Jul	Aug	Sep	Oct	Nov	Dec	Year
Record high °F (°C)	67 (19)	71 (22)	84 (29)	93 (34)	95 (35)	104 (40)	107 (42)	104 (40)	100 (38)	92 (33)	81 (27)	70 (21)	107 (42)
Mean daily maximum °F (°C)	32.8 (0.4)	37.5 (3.1)	49.9 (9.9)	62.2 (16.8)	72.3 (22.4)	81.5 (27.5)	85.1 (29.5)	83.8 (28.8)	77.1 (25.1)	64.2 (17.9)	49.7 (9.8)	37.6 (3.1)	61.1 (16.2)
Daily mean °F (°C)	24.8 (−4.0)	29.2 (−1.6)	40.8 (4.9)	52.4 (11.3)	63.1 (17.3)	72.5 (22.5)	76.3 (24.6)	74.7 (23.7)	67.1 (19.5)	54.7 (12.6)	41.3 (5.2)	30.2 (−1.0)	52.3 (11.3)
Mean daily minimum °F (°C)	16.9 (−8.4)	20.9 (−6.2)	31.6 (−0.2)	42.5 (5.8)	53.8 (12.1)	63.4 (17.4)	67.5 (19.7)	65.6 (18.7)	57.2 (14.0)	45.2 (7.3)	32.8 (0.4)	22.7 (−5.2)	43.3 (6.3)
Record low °F (°C)	−23 (−31)	−21 (−29)	−11 (−24)	11 (−12)	22 (−6)	41 (5)	47 (8)	42 (6)	31 (−1)	15 (−9)	−5 (−21)	−19 (−28)	−23 (−31)
Average precipitation inches (mm)	1.69 (43)	1.93 (49)	2.72 (69)	3.97 (101)	5.11 (130)	5.16 (131)	4.06 (103)	3.80 (97)	3.51 (89)	3.06 (78)	2.43 (62)	1.92 (49)	39.36 (1,000)
Average snowfall inches (cm)	6.1 (15)	4.6 (12)	1.7 (4.3)	0.5 (1.3)	0.0 (0.0)	0.0 (0.0)	0.0 (0.0)	0.0 (0.0)	0.0 (0.0)	0.1 (0.25)	0.8 (2.0)	4.3 (11)	18.1 (46)
Average precipitation days (≥ 0.01 in)	8.1	8.2	9.7	11.6	12.5	10.4	9.3	8.5	7.4	8.9	8.2	8.0	110.8
Average snowy days (≥ 0.1 in)	4.0	2.9	1.3	0.2	0.0	0.0	0.0	0.0	0.0	0.1	0.5	2.8	11.8
Source 1: National Oceanic and Atmospheric Administration
Source 2: National Centers for Environmental Information

== Demographics ==
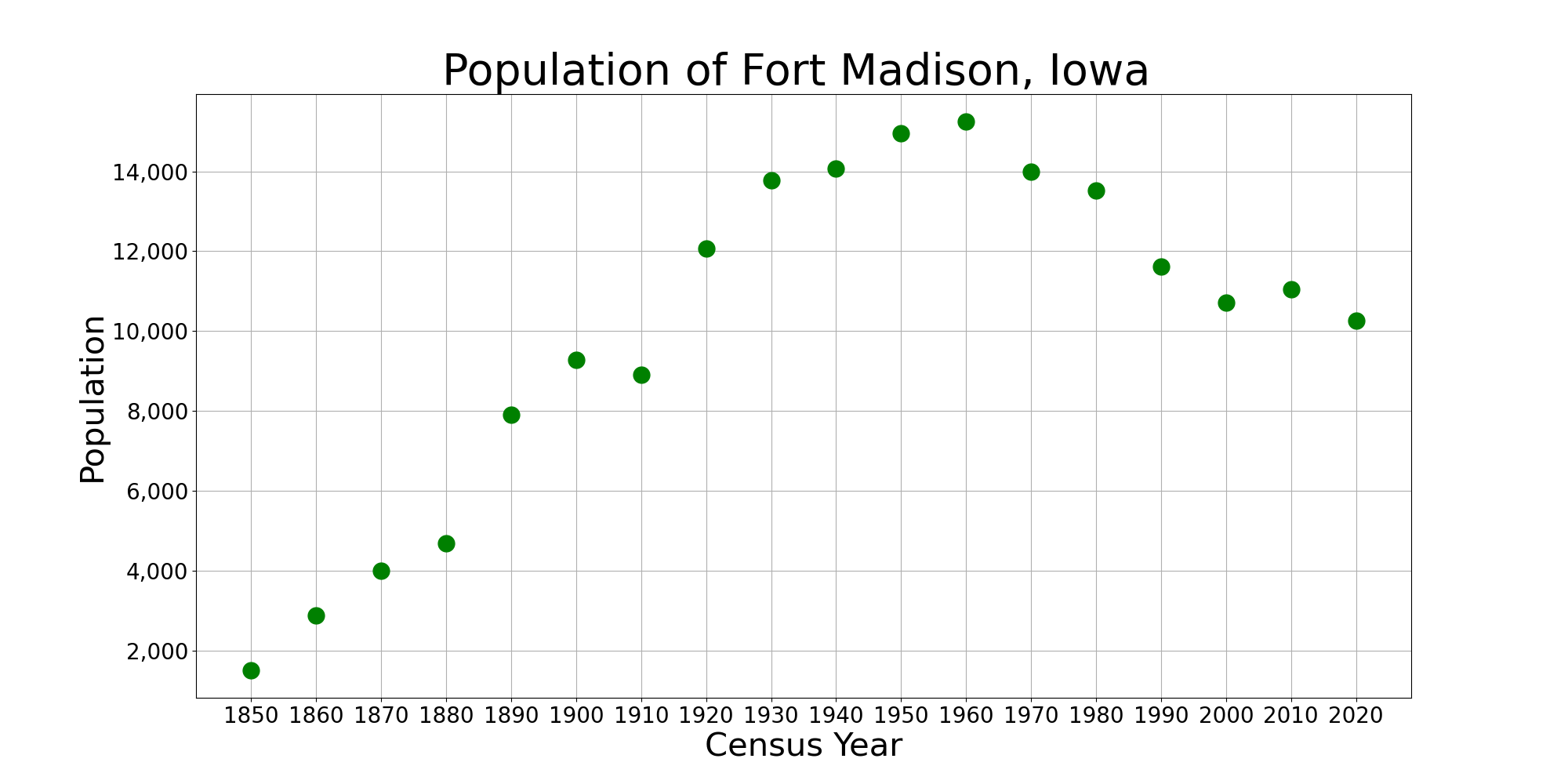
The population of Fort Madison, Iowa from the U.S. census data

Historical population
Census	Pop.	Note	%±
1850	1,509		—
1860	2,886		91.3%
1870	4,011		39.0%
1880	4,679		16.7%
1890	7,901		68.9%
1900	9,278		17.4%
1910	8,900		−4.1%
1920	12,066		35.6%
1930	13,779		14.2%
1940	14,063		2.1%
1950	14,954		6.3%
1960	15,247		2.0%
1970	13,996		−8.2%
1980	13,520		−3.4%
1990	11,618		−14.1%
2000	10,715		−7.8%
2010	11,051		3.1%
2020	10,270		−7.1%
2025 (est.)	9,935		−3.3%
U.S. Decennial Census; 2020 Census

According to realtor website Zillow, the average price of a home as of July 31, 2026, in Fort Madison was $112,910.

As of the 2024 American Community Survey, there were 4,548 estimated households in Fort Madison with an average of 2.05 persons per household. The city has a median household income of $50,705. Approximately 15.0% of the city's population lives at or below the poverty line. Fort Madison has an estimated 51.5% employment rate, with 18.5% of the population holding a bachelor's degree or higher and 90.7% holding a high school diploma. There were 5,030 housing units at an average density of 521.24 per square mile (201.25/km^{2}).

The top five reported languages (people were allowed to report up to two languages, thus the figures will generally add to more than 100%) were English (97.3%), Spanish (1.4%), Indo-European (0.8%), Asian and Pacific Islander (0.3%), and Other (0.3%).

The median age in the city was 42.1 years.

Fort Madison, Iowa – racial and ethnic composition Note: the US Census treats Hispanic/Latino as an ethnic category. This table excludes Latinos from the racial categories and assigns them to a separate category. Hispanics/Latinos may be of any race.
Race / ethnicity (NH = non-Hispanic)	Pop. 1990	Pop. 2000	Pop. 2010	Pop. 2020	% 1990	% 2000	% 2010	% 2020
White alone (NH)	10,443	9,629	9,403	8,574	89.89%	89.86%	85.09%	83.49%
Black or African American alone (NH)	546	274	598	444	4.70%	2.56%	5.41%	4.32%
Native American or Alaska Native alone (NH)	21	28	40	26	0.18%	0.26%	0.36%	0.25%
Asian alone (NH)	47	65	60	63	0.40%	0.61%	0.54%	0.61%
Pacific Islander alone (NH)	—	17	3	2	—	0.16%	0.03%	0.02%
Other race alone (NH)	9	14	7	34	0.08%	0.13%	0.06%	0.33%
Mixed race or multiracial (NH)	—	105	205	486	—	0.98%	1.86%	4.73%
Hispanic or Latino (any race)	552	583	735	641	4.75%	5.44%	6.65%	6.24%
Total	11,618	10,715	11,051	10,270	100.00%	100.00%	100.00%	100.00%

=== 2020 census ===
As of the 2020 census, there were 10,270 people, 4,315 households, and 2,455 families residing in the city. The population density was 1,064.91 inhabitants per square mile (411.16/km^{2}). There were 5,013 housing units at an average density of 519.81 per square mile (200.70/km^{2}). The racial makeup of the city was 85.97% White, 4.40% African American, 0.39% Native American, 0.61% Asian, 0.02% Pacific Islander, 1.74% from some other races and 6.86% from two or more races. Hispanic or Latino people of any race were 6.24% of the population.

=== 2010 census ===
As of the 2010 census, there were 11,051 people, 4,403 households, and 2,667 families residing in the city. The population density was 1,164.24 inhabitants per square mile (449.52/km^{2}). There were 4,956 housing units at an average density of 522.12 per square mile (201.59/km^{2}). The racial makeup of the city was 89.33% White, 5.54% African American, 0.38% Native American, 0.55% Asian, 0.06% Pacific Islander, 1.65% from some other races and 2.49% from two or more races. Hispanic or Latino people of any race were 6.65% of the population.

There were 4,403 households, of which 28.7% had children under the age of 18 living with them, 41.7% were married couples living together, 13.4% had a female householder with no husband present, 5.5% had a male householder with no wife present, and 39.4% were non-families. 33.4% of all households were made up of individuals, and 13.9% had someone living alone who was 65 years of age or older. The average household size was 2.26 and the average family size was 2.84.

The median age in the city was 39.9 years. 21% of residents were under the age of 18; 9.2% were between the ages of 18 and 24; 26.2% were from 25 to 44; 28% were from 45 to 64; and 15.7% were 65 years of age or older. The gender makeup of the city was 52.8% male and 47.2% female.

=== 2000 census ===
As of the 2000 census, there were 10,715 people, 4,617 households and 2,876 families residing in the city. The population density was 1,162.90 inhabitants per square mile (449.00/km^{2}). There were 5,106 housing units at an average density of 554.16 per square mile (213.96/km^{2}). The racial makeup of the city was 92.64% White, 2.67% African American, 0.28% Native American, 0.61% Asian, 0.17% Pacific Islander, 2.36% from some other races and 1.28% from two or more races. Hispanic or Latino people of any race were 5.44% of the population.

There were 4,617 households, of which 28.2% had children under the age of 18 living with them, 46.7% were married couples living together, 11.8% had a female householder with no husband present, and 37.7% were non-families. 33.2% of all households were made up of individuals, and 15.8% had someone living alone who was 65 years of age or older. The average household size was 2.27 and the average family size was 2.87.

Age spread: 23.6% under the age of 18, 8.4% from 18 to 24, 26.1% from 25 to 44, 23.1% from 45 to 64, and 18.8% who were 65 years of age or older. The median age was 40 years. For every 100 females, there were 90.5 males. For every 100 females age 18 and over, there were 86.3 males.

The median income for a household in the city was $34,318, and the median family income was $42,067. Males had a median income of $32,530 versus $21,170 for females. The per capita income was $18,124. About 9.8% of families and 12.2% of the population were below the poverty line, including 18.1% of those under age 18 and 9.1% of those age 65 or over.

== Economy ==
The W.A. Sheaffer Pen Company was founded in Fort Madison in 1907 by Walter A. Sheaffer. Sheaffer owned a jewelry store, in the back of which he invented a lever-filling fountain pen. Millions of pens were produced. The company was sold in 1997 to the French manufacturer Bic, which closed the Fort Madison plant in 2006, and then to the A.T. Cross Company of Providence, RI in 2014. The Sheaffer Pen Museum in Fort Madison features many exhibits of the company's writing instruments.

== Arts and culture ==
An annual Parade of Lights along Avenue G takes place on the Friday after Thanksgiving, following which the lighted floats, sponsored by local businesses and industry, go on display in Riverside Park until after New Year's Day.

The North Lee County Historical Society curated many historic locations in Fort Madison.

- The BNSF swing span double decker bridge was the longest double decker, swing span bridge in the world when it was constructed in 1927 at 3,140 feet long.
- The North Lee County Courthouse is the oldest active courthouse in the state, built in the 1840s.
- The North Lee County Jail was constructed in 1867 and served as a small jailhouse into the 1970s. It is now the site of tours hosted by the city on a Beggars Night celebration every Halloween.
- Brush College was built in the mid-1800s to replace the log one-room school.
- The historical society maintains both the Chicago, Burlington and Quincy Railroad Depot and the Atchison, Topeka and Santa Fe Railway caboose and steam locomotive.

== Government ==
Fort Madison has a Mayor/City Council form of government. The city council consists of a Mayor and seven council members. Five council members are elected from individual wards and two are elected at large. The mayor is elected in a citywide vote. The Iowa State Penitentiary, a maximum security institution for men, is in Fort Madison.

== Education ==
Fort Madison has a Junior College Campus Southeastern Community College (Iowa) located at 1602 Avenue F.

The Fort Madison Community School District, the public school district of the city, has two elementary schools (Richardson and Lincoln), one middle school (Fort Madison Middle School) and one high school (Fort Madison High School).

A section of the city limits lies in the Central Lee Community School District.

Fort Madison also has a Catholic School System, Holy Trinity Catholic Schools, which formed in 2005 from the merger of Aquinas Schools in Fort Madison with the West Point Catholic schools. Holy Trinity High School consists of a junior/senior high school. Holy Trinity Elementary School is a few miles away in West Point, Iowa.

== Infrastructure ==
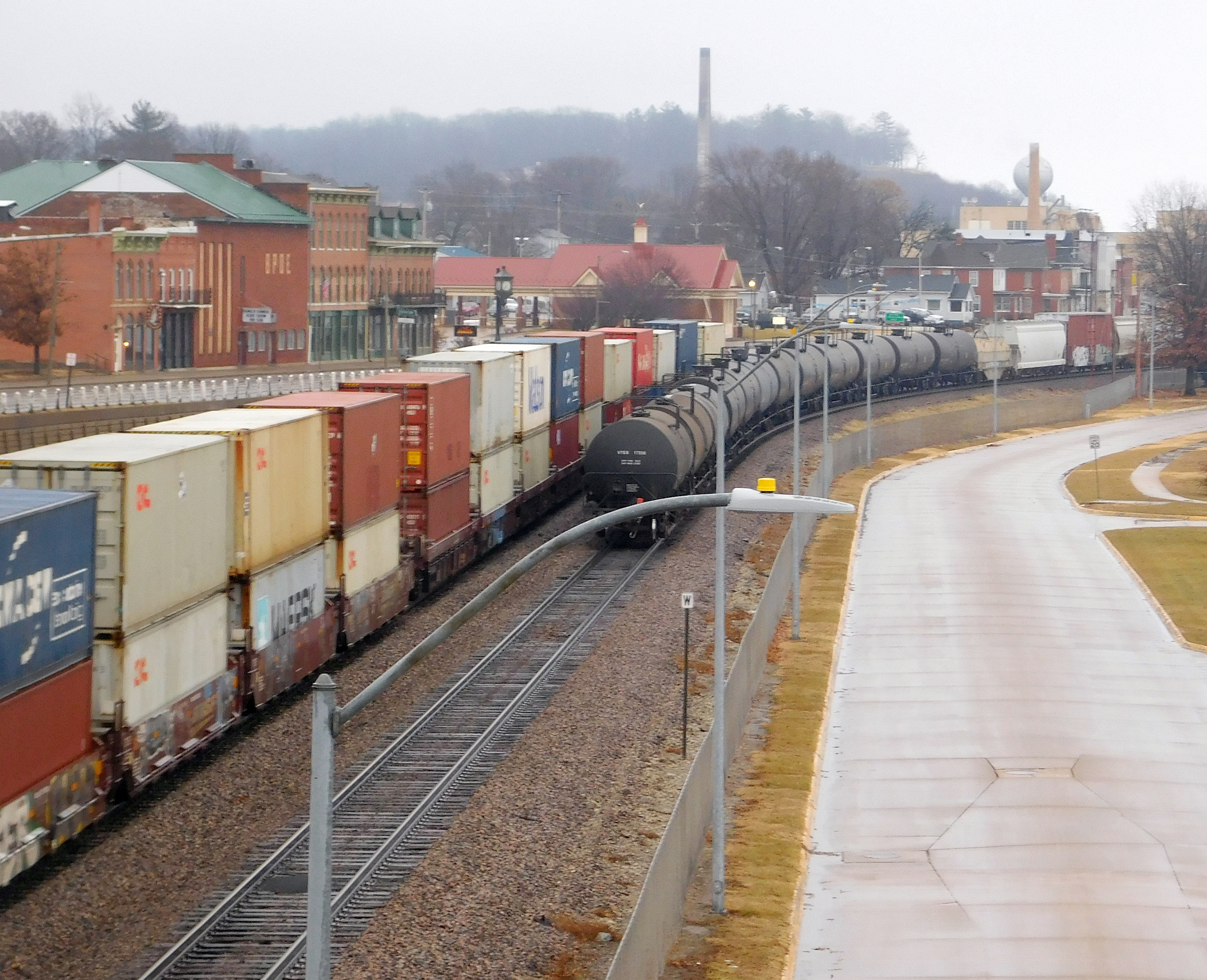
BNSF mainline track in Fort Madison

=== Transportation ===
Amtrak, the national passenger rail system, has a station in Fort Madison (& Atchison, Topeka and Santa Fe Passenger and Freight Complex Historic District) that serves its Southwest Chief route with daily service in each direction between Union Station in Chicago, Illinois and Union Station in Los Angeles, California. Fort Madison is the only Southwest Chief route stop within the state of Iowa. The Southwest Chief crosses the Mississippi River on the Fort Madison Toll Bridge just to the east of town. The span, owned by the BNSF Railway, is the world's longest swing bridge, and it carries both road and rail traffic across the Mississippi River over its upper and lower deck, respectively, between Fort Madison and Niota, Illinois.

In addition to Amtrak, two other railroads serve Fort Madison: the BNSF (Burlington Northern Santa Fe) and Union Pacific.

Greyhound Bus Lines stops to pick up or discharge passengers at 5002 Avenue O in Fort Madison.

U.S. Route Business 61 and Iowa Highway 2 form a single artery that runs east and west through the heart of the city, following the river and railroad tracks. A controlled access U.S. Route 61 bypass around Fort Madison opened to traffic in the fall of 2011. U.S. Route 61 connects to U.S. Route 34, U.S. Route 218/Iowa Highway 27, Iowa Highway 2, Iowa Highway 16 and Interstate 80 in Iowa; Interstate 72 in Illinois; and Interstate 70 in Missouri.

== Notable people ==
- Black Hawk, Sauk leader in the 1832 Black Hawk War.
- Mark W. Balmert, U.S. Navy admiral
- Brad Bigler, head men's basketball coach at SMSU
- Ryan Bowen, NBA player
- James Duderstadt, President of the University of Michigan
- Todd Farmer, writer, actor, and film producer
- Bob Fry, professional golfer
- Jane Greer, poet
- Kate Harrington, poet
- Thomas M. Hoenig, chief executive of the Tenth District Federal Reserve Bank, in Kansas City
- Patty Judge, 46th Lieutenant Governor
- Jerry Junkins, CEO of Texas Instruments, Incorporated
- Dick Klein, founder of the Chicago Bulls
- Jeff Kurtz, member of the Iowa House of Representatives from district 83
- Dennis O'Keefe, actor, star of films such as Raw Deal
- James Theodore Richmond, writer and conservationist
- Aloysius Schulte, first President of St. Ambrose College
- Walter A. Sheaffer, founder of the W.A. Sheaffer Pen Company
- John Van Valkenburg, lawyer and politician
- George Henry Williams, United States Senator

== Sister city ==
- Prüm, Germany
