= Sheaffer =

Manufacturer of writing instruments

Sheaffer Pen & Art Supply Co.
- Type: Subsidiary
- Industry: Writing instruments
- Founded: 1912; 114 years ago
- Founder: Walter A. Sheaffer
- Headquarters: Shelton, Connecticut, US
- Area served: International
- Key people: Tim Williams (General Manager)
- Products: Fountain and ballpoint pens, ink
- Net income: $ 36 million
- Number of employees: 250
- Parent: William Penn Pvt. Ltd
- Website: sheaffer.com

Sheaffer Pen Corporation (/ˈʃeɪfər/) is an American manufacturing company of writing instruments, particularly luxury fountain pens. The company was founded by Walter A. Sheaffer in Fort Madison, Iowa, and incorporated in 1913 to exploit his invention of a lever-filling fountain pen. The brand was sold by French company Bic to A. T. Cross Company in August, 2014. In August 2022 the brand was sold to and is currently owned by William Penn Private Limited, a multi-brand retailer and distributor of writing instruments and accessories.

== History ==
In 1912, Walter A. Sheaffer took his idea of a pen filling apparatus that utilized a lever system and, with his life savings, founded the W. A. Sheaffer Pen Company in Fort Madison, Iowa. The company was established in the back room of Mr. Sheaffer's jewelry store with seven employees, and was incorporated a year later, in 1913. By the 1930s, Sheaffer fountain pens were being advertised as the pen that "fills instantly from any ink-well, with one touch of a finger. Cleans automatically when filling."

Sheaffer has manufactured fountain pens down to the present day. The original lever-filler mechanism remained in use through the end of the 1940s, though a sac-less plunger design was introduced in the early 1930s. In 1949 Sheaffer adopted the "Touchdown" pneumatic filling mechanism for its top-line fountain pens. A development of the Touchdown design was the Snorkel, which added a small extendable tube underneath the nib to avoid the need to dip the nib into ink when operating the filler plunger. The last Snorkel pen was the oversized "Pen For Men (PFM)," a fat-bodied model introduced in 1959 with the then-new "Inlaid Nib" which has since been featured on all Sheaffer's high-end pens.

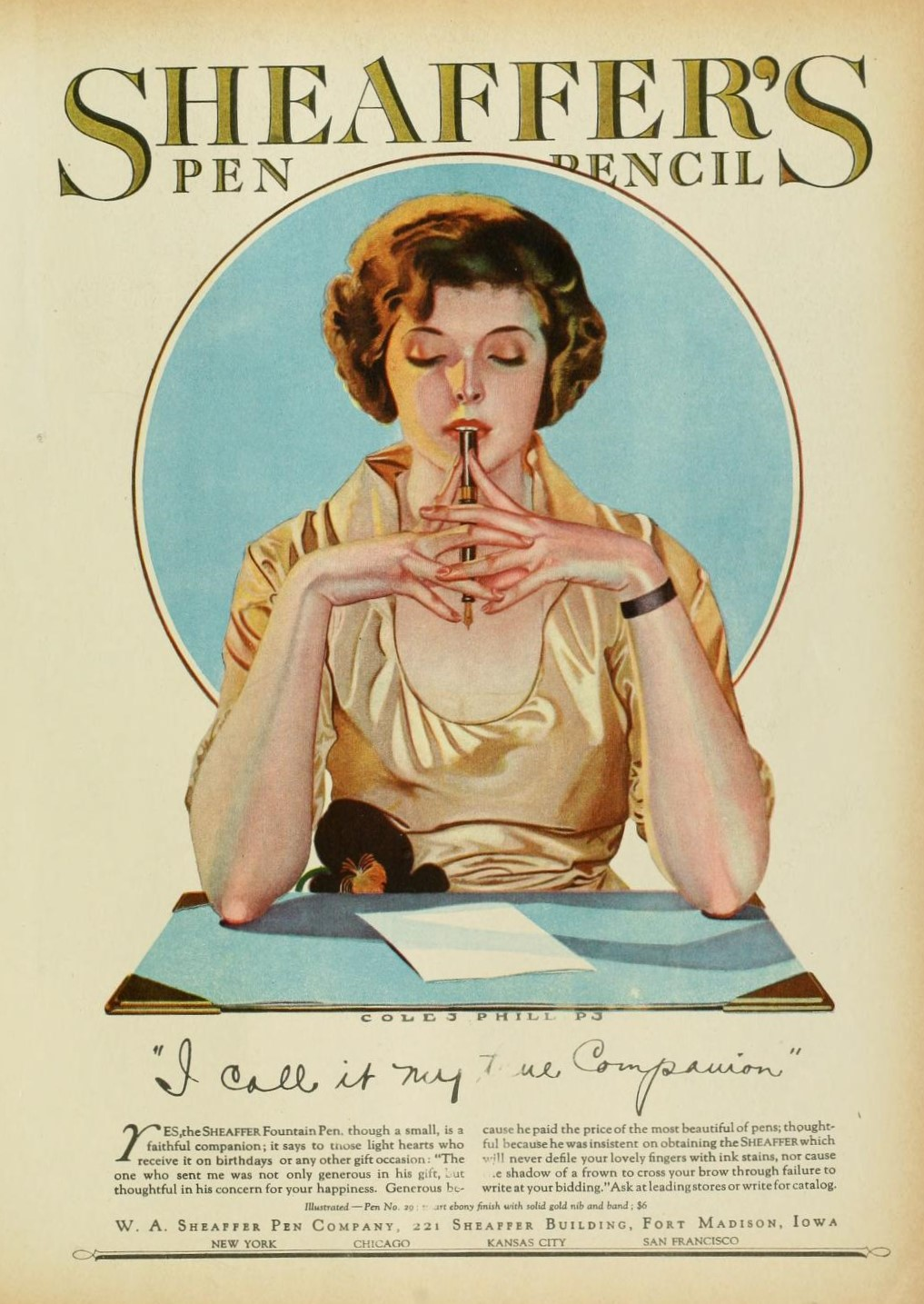
1920 advertisement, painted by Coles Phillips

All Sheaffer pens after 1959 (excluding the PFM) were designed to accept either ink cartridges or a converter to allow the use of bottled ink. The Targa was a popular high-end model that was introduced in 1976 and came in over eighty finishes and two sizes (classic and slim). The still very popular Connaisseur pen was introduced in 1986 (using the idiosyncratic spelling as a marketing ploy) as an upgraded version of the low-cost No-Nonsense line that paid homage to earlier Sheaffer flat-tops, and included the high end Grande series, and three series of Levenger Connoisseurs that were dual branded and sold by Levenger.

Another popular Sheaffer fountain pen was the low cost "School Pen." Current high end pens include the Valor and the Legacy series, all of which retain the inlaid nib.

On July 31, 1997, Société Bic S.A., known for its Bic pens and lighters, agreed to buy Sheaffer for less than $50 million. Bic, of France, bought Sheaffer from Gefinor S.A., a Geneva-based investment bank, according to Thierry Michels, communications director at Bic. Michels said Bic paid less than the $50 million that Sheaffer had achieved in current annual sales. At the time of the Bic purchase, Sheaffer had 550 employees, 450 of whom were based in North America.

In 2003, corporate officials announced their intention of closing Sheaffer's Fort Madison, Iowa, plant after nearly a century of making pens in the southeastern Iowa city. At its peak, the company employed more than 1,000 people in Fort Madison. The shutdown of the factory was completed by the end of March 2008, affecting about 40 workers. Sheaffer's fountain pen point assembly department was moved to a third-party manufacturer in China. Customer service, purchasing, information technology, warehousing and distribution operations, packaging, and quality control were relocated to Slovakia.

Bought by BIC in 1997, Sheaffer was sold in August 2014 to the A. T. Cross Company for $15 million (US). In August 2022, William Penn Pvt. Ltd from India, purchased Sheaffer from A.T. Cross company.

== Products ==
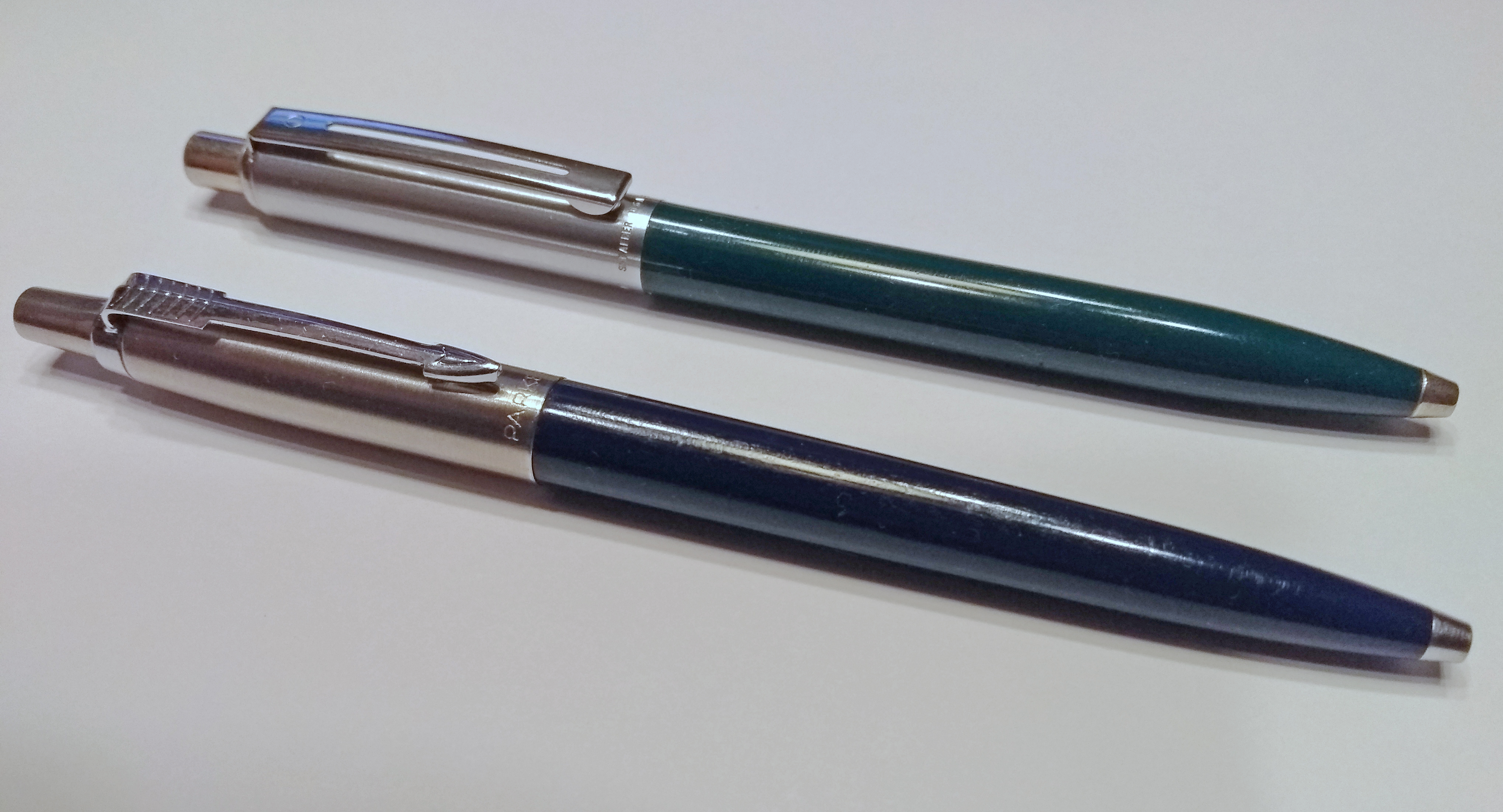
The Parker Jotter (front) and Sheaffer Sentinel (back) are similar entry level retracting refillable ballpoint pens

Sheaffer currently manufactures thirteen models of luxury writing instruments, including: Taranis, Legacy Heritage, Prelude, Prelude Mini, Sagaris, Intensity, 500, 300, 200, 100, Stylus, Sentinel, and VFM. As well as writing instruments, Sheaffer also manufactures leather pen pouches and tablet holders, two calligraphy sets, three types of pencil erasers, ballpoint and rollerball refills, stylus refills, Sheaffer converters, eight colors of Skrip bottled ink, Sheaffer Skrip cartridges, and Skrip universal cartridges.

In 2013, Sheaffer launched the Ferrari collection luxury writing instruments.

In 2017, Sheaffer launched a new line of pens, called The Sheaffer Ion and The Sheaffer Pop, in an attempt to appeal to a modern, creative consumer.

== See also ==
- List of pen types, brands and companies
- Walter A. Sheaffer
