= A. T. Cross Company =

American manufacturing company

A.T. Cross Company, LLC

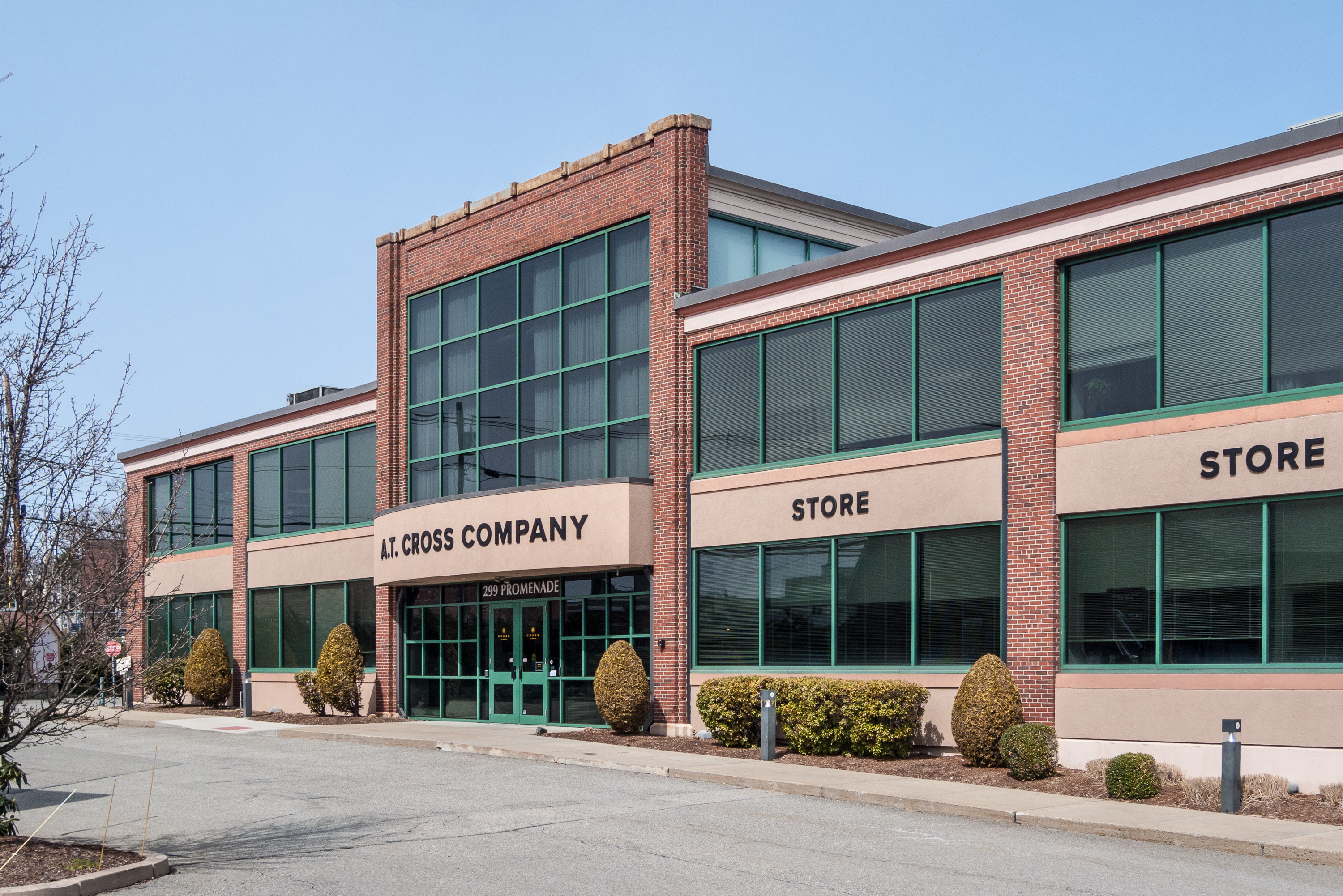
- Providence headquarters
- Company type: Private
- Industry: Writing implements
- Founded: 1846; 180 years ago in Providence, US
- Founder: Richard Cross
- Headquarters: Providence, RI, USA
- Area served: Worldwide
- Key people: Robert Baird (CEO)
- Products: Fountain, ballpoint, and rollerball pens, mechanical pencils
- Revenue: ▲US$158.3 million (2010)
- Operating income: ▲US$9.32 million (2010)
- Net income: ▲US$6.37 million (2010)
- Total assets: ▲US$144.63 million (2010)
- Total equity: ▲US$72.47 million (2010)
- Owner: Transom Capital Group, LLC
- Number of employees: 105 in Rhode Island; 830 worldwide
- Website: www.cross.com

A. T. Cross Company, LLC is an American manufacturing company of writing implements, based in Providence, Rhode Island. Founded in 1846, it is one of the oldest pen manufacturers in the world. Cross' products include fountain, ballpoint, and rollerball pens, mechanical pencils and refills. The company also manufactures accessories for those goods such as cases and wallets.

The company has also owned Sheaffer, another pen manufacturer, since 2014. In August 2022, the Sheaffer brand was sold to the William Penn company.

== History ==
The company was founded in 1846 in Providence, Rhode Island. It initially manufactured gold and silver casings for pencils, reflecting the Cross family's history as jewelers. The company was founded by Richard Cross, who passed it on to his son, Alonzo T. Cross.

The company developed many innovative new writing instruments, including forerunners of the modern mechanical pencils, and the earliest stylographic pens. In the 1960s, the company moved its headquarters to a large facility (about 155,000 square feet) in Lincoln, Rhode Island.

After trading on the NASDAQ for five years (under the now-defunct symbol ATX), the company was sold in 2013 to Clarion Capital Partners, LLC, but it retained its headquarters in Lincoln, Rhode Island. The Sheaffer pen company was acquired by A.T. Cross in 2014.

In May 2016, with its headquarters in Lincoln becoming too large, the company accepted a set of tax credits and incentives in exchange for moving its headquarters to Providence, Rhode Island. The new headquarters, measuring about 4200 square feet, is located at The Foundry, the former Brown and Sharpe Manufacturing Company Complex at 299 Promenade Street in Providence. Most employees were moved to the new location by October 2016. In January 2021, the company moved within the complex to 295 Promenade Street. This was a significantly smaller building, as the company moved to a hybrid work from home scheme due to the COVID-19 pandemic.

In addition to its US manufacturing base, the company, in 1973, opened a manufacturing plant in Ballinasloe, County Galway, Ireland, mainly serving the European market, until its closure in late 2000.

On November 16, 2017, Transom Capital Group, LLC announced that it had bought the assets of A.T. Cross Company.

In August 2022, the Sheaffer subsidiary was sold to and is currently owned by William Penn Private Limited, an Indian multi-brand retailer and distributor of writing instruments and accessories.

== Presidential pens ==
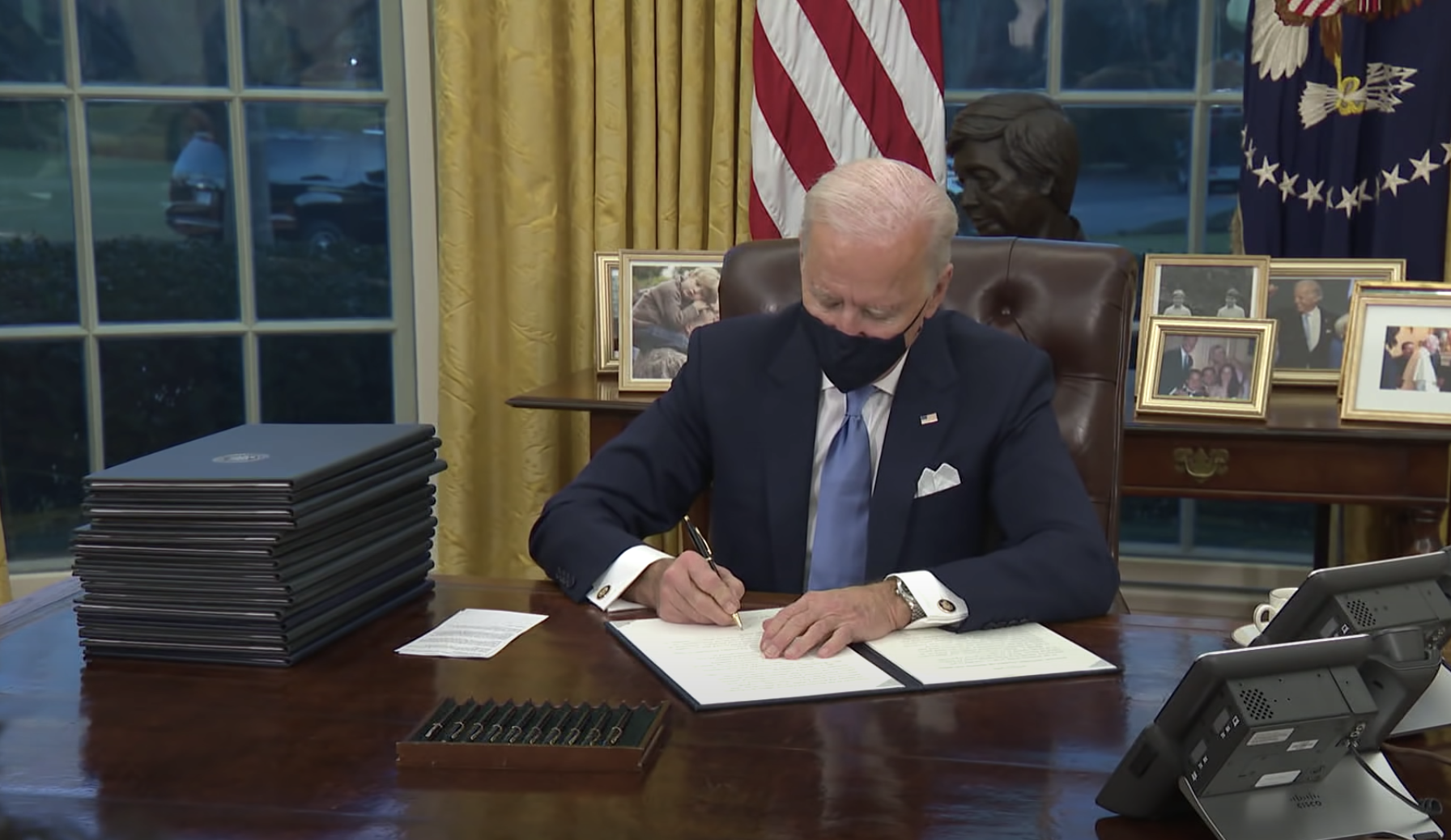
President Joe Biden signs his first executive order upon taking office with a black Cross Century II Rollerball

Cross has been an official supplier of pens to the White House since at least the 1970s. The pens used to sign legislation are often given out as souvenirs to those who attend the bill signings.

While an official Cross–White House program was begun under president Bill Clinton, the tradition goes back to at least the administration of Gerald Ford. All presidents from Ronald Reagan to Joe Biden signed legislation using Cross pens; it is unknown if earlier presidents did so. Barack Obama, George W. Bush and Clinton favored the Cross Townsend model; Obama later switched to the Century II model in black lacquer, with black medium point refill.

The Trump administration placed an initial order for 150 Cross Century II pens in January 2017. Sometime before November 2018, Trump broke with tradition and ceased using the Cross pen, saying "it was a horrible pen, and it was extremely expensive." Thereafter, he signed documents using a customized Sharpie marker manufactured by Newell Brands. Joe Biden returned the tradition of Cross Pens to the White House, favoring the same model as Obama, the Century II Rollerball in a black lacquer finish with 23-karat gold-plated appointments. Biden is reported to use the felt-tip refill unit.

== Products ==
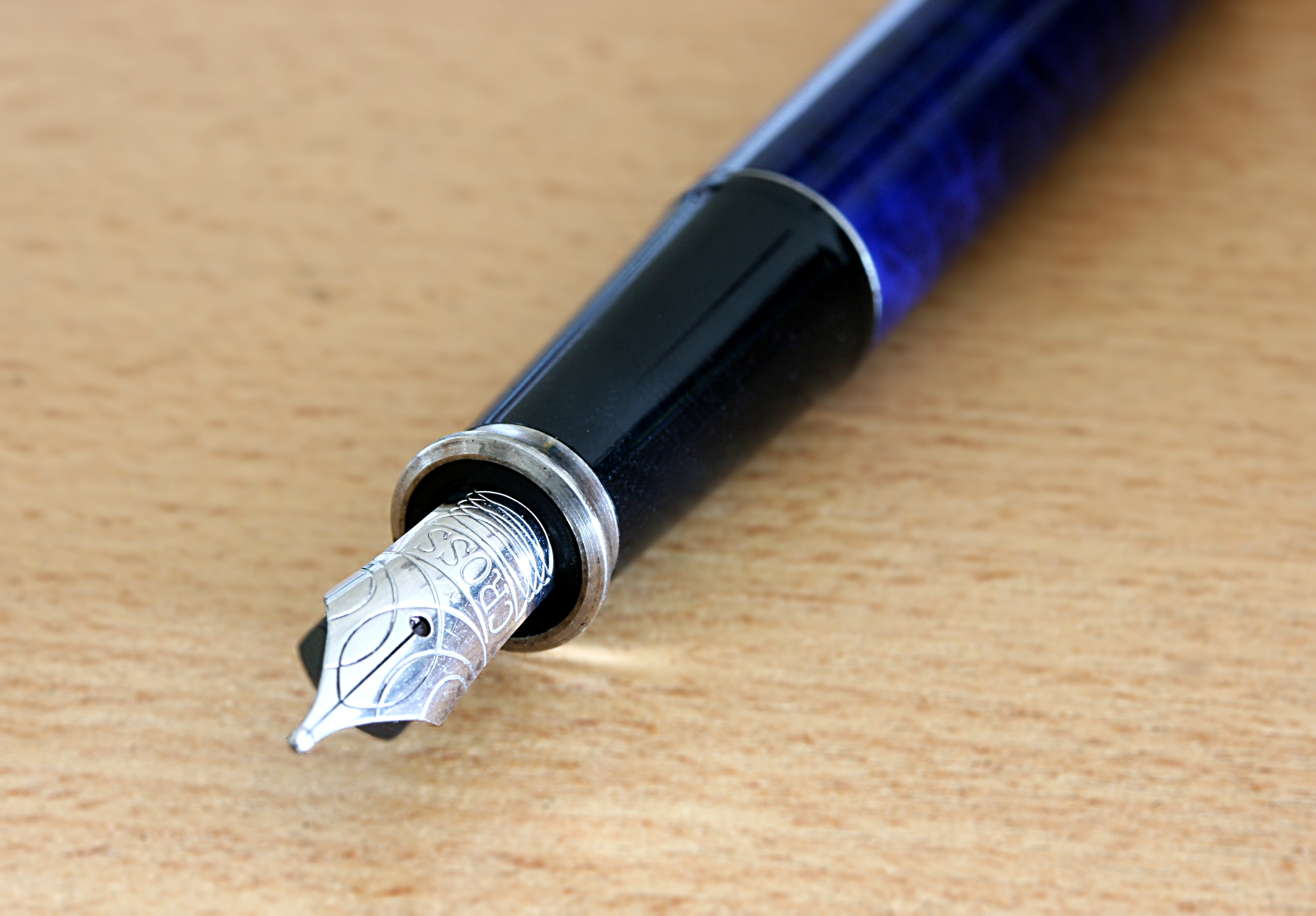
Fountain pen, with the distinctive "Cross" lettering on its nib

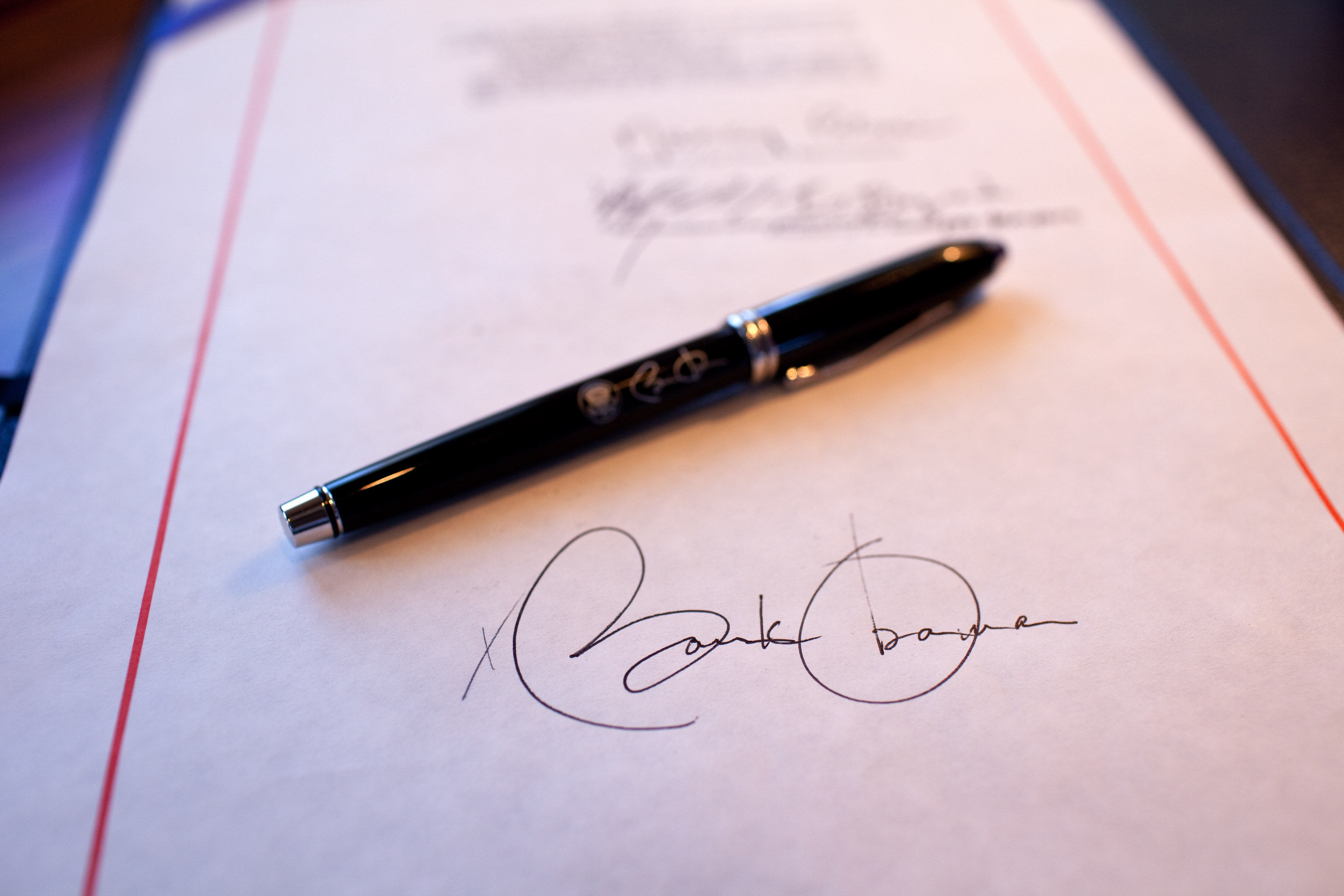
Obama's Townsend in black lacquer

Cross is well known for its writing instrument lines, beginning with mechanical pencils, and it produced the first stylographic pens (a technological forerunner of the modern ballpoint pen) in 1879. The current product line includes fountain pens, ballpoint pens, gel pens, and mechanical pencils. The first Cross fountain pens were likely produced in 1930, but not again until the 1980s.

Cross writing instruments are generally sold in the mid-range of the market, rather than the extreme luxury end.

Most Cross writing instruments are now made in China, although some of the work for customized pens for presidents and politicians is done in New England. The company also manufactures a range of wristwatches, cufflinks, desk accessories and leather goods such as pen cases, portfolios, and other items often targeted at the gift market.

In late 1997, Cross and IBM teamed up to introduce a digital writing pad, called the CrossPad, which was discontinued in 2004.
