= List of Washington Commanders team records =

The Washington Commanders are a professional American football franchise based in the Washington metropolitan area. They are members of the East division in the National Football Conference (NFC) of the National Football League (NFL). The Commanders were founded in 1932 as the Boston Braves, named after the local baseball franchise. The team changed its name to the Redskins the following year and moved to Washington, D.C. in 1937. The franchise retired the Redskins branding in 2020, playing as the Washington Football Team before rebranding as the Washington Commanders in 2022.

== Passing ==
=== Yardage ===
Yards

Top 20 career
Name	Yards	Start	End
Joe Theismann	25,206	1974	1985
Sonny Jurgensen	22,585	1964	1974
Sammy Baugh	21,886	1937	1952
Kirk Cousins	16,206	2012	2017
Mark Rypien	15,928	1988	1993
Billy Kilmer	12,352	1971	1978
Jason Campbell	10,860	2006	2009
Gus Frerotte	9,769	1994	1998
Norm Snead	8,306	1961	1963
Robert Griffin III	8,097	2012	2014
Eddie LeBaron	8,068	1952	1959
Jay Schroeder	7,445	1985	1987
Brad Johnson	6,510	1999	2000
Mark Brunell	6,033	2004	2006
Patrick Ramsey	5,649	2002	2005
Jayden Daniels	4,830	2024	Present
Doug Williams	4,350	1986	1989
Sam Howell	4,115	2022	2024
Rex Grossman	4,035	2010	2012
Alex Smith	3,600	2018	2020

Top 20 single-season
Name	Yards	Year
Kirk Cousins	4,917	2016
Kirk Cousins	4,166	2015
Jay Schroeder	4,109	1986
Kirk Cousins	4,093	2017
Brad Johnson	4,005	1999
Sam Howell	3,946	2023
Mark Rypien	3,768	1989
Sonny Jurgensen	3,747	1967
Joe Theismann	3,714	1983
Jason Campbell	3,618	2009
Joe Theismann	3,568	1981
Jayden Daniels	3,568	2024
Mark Rypien	3,564	1991
Gus Frerotte	3,453	1996
Trent Green	3,441	1998
Joe Theismann	3,391	1984
Donovan McNabb	3,377	2010
Mark Rypien	3,282	1992
Jason Campbell	3,245	2008
Sonny Jurgensen	3,209	1966

Top 5 single-game
Name	Yards	Year	Opponent
Brad Johnson	471	1999	San Francisco 49ers
Kirk Cousins	458	2016	Cincinnati Bengals
Kirk Cousins	449	2016	Dallas Cowboys
Sammy Baugh	446	1948	Boston Yanks
Mark Rypien	442	1991	Atlanta Falcons

=== Completions ===
Completions

Top 20 career
Name	Completions	Start	End
Joe Theismann	2,044	1974	1985
Sonny Jurgensen	1,831	1964	1974
Sammy Baugh	1,693	1937	1952
Kirk Cousins	1,372	2012	2017
Mark Rypien	1,244	1988	1993
Jason Campbell	1,002	2006	200
Billy Kilmer	953	1971	1978
Gus Frerotte	744	1994	1998
Robert Griffin III	679	2012	2014
Brad Johnson	544	1999	2000
Mark Brunell	542	2004	2006
Eddie LeBaron	539	1952	1959
Norm Snead	531	1961	1963
Jay Schroeder	517	1985	1987
Patrick Ramsey	480	2002	2005
Jayden Daniels	445	2024	Present
Sam Howell	399	2022	2024
Alex Smith	351	2018	2020
Doug Williams	345	1986	1989
Rex Grossman	339	2010	2012

Top 20 single-season
Name	Completions	Year
Kirk Cousins	406	2016
Sam Howell	388	2023
Kirk Cousins	379	2015
Kirk Cousins	347	2017
Jayden Daniels	331	2024
Jason Campbell	327	2009
Brad Johnson	316	1999
Jason Campbell	315	2008
Joe Theismann	293	1981
Sonny Jurgensen	288	1967
Joe Theismann	283	1984
Mark Rypien	280	1989
Trent Green	278	1998
Joe Theismann	276	1983
Jay Schroeder	276	1986
Donovan McNabb	275	2010
Sonny Jurgensen	274	1969
Robert Griffin III	274	2013
Gus Frerotte	270	1996
Mark Rypien	269	1992
Rex Grossman	265	2011

Top single-game
Name	Completions	Year	Opponent
Kirk Cousins	41	2016	Dallas Cowboys
Sam Howell	39	2023	Philadelphia Eagles
Dwayne Haskins	38	2020	Seattle Seahawks
Alex Smith	38	2020	Detroit Lions
Kirk Cousins	38	2016	Cincinnati Bengals

=== Touchdowns ===
Touchdowns

Top 20 career
Name	TDs	Start	End
Sammy Baugh	187	1937	1952
Sonny Jurgensen	179	1964	1974
Joe Theismann	160	1974	1985
Billy Kilmer	103	1971	1978
Mark Rypien	101	1988	1993
Kirk Cousins	99	2012	2017
Eddie LeBaron	59	1952	1959
Jason Campbell	55	2006	2009
Gus Frerotte	48	1994	1998
Norm Snead	46	1961	1963
Robert Griffin III	40	2012	2015
Jay Schroeder	39	1985	1987
Mark Brunell	38	2004	2006
Brad Johnson	35	1999	2000
Patrick Ramsey	34	2002	2005
Jayden Daniels	33	2024	Present
Frank Filchock	32	1938	1945
Doug Williams	27	1986	1989
Trent Green	23	1997	1998
Rex Grossman	23	2010	2012

Top 20 single-season
Name	TDs	Year
Sonny Jurgensen	31	1967
Kirk Cousins	29	2015
Joe Theismann	29	1983
Sonny Jurgensen	28	1966
Mark Rypien	28	1991
Kirk Cousins	27	2017
Sammy Baugh	25	1947
Kirk Cousins	25	2016
Jayden Daniels	25	2024
Sonny Jurgensen	24	1964
Joe Theismann	24	1984
Brad Johnson	24	1999
Sammy Baugh	23	1943
Sonny Jurgensen	23	1970
Billy Kilmer	23	1975
Trent Green	23	1998
Mark Brunell	23	2005
Sammy Baugh	22	1948
Norm Snead	22	1962
Sonny Jurgensen	22	1969
Jay Schroeder	22	1986

Top 3 single-game
Name	TDs	Year	Opponent
Sammy Baugh	6	1943	Brooklyn Dodgers
Sammy Baugh	6	1947	Chicago Cardinals
Mark Rypien	6	1991	Atlanta Falcons

== Receiving ==
=== Receptions ===
Receptions

Top 25 career
Name	Rec.	Start	End
Art Monk	888	1980	1993
Charley Taylor	649	1964	1977
Santana Moss	581	2005	2014
Gary Clark	549	1985	1992
Terry McLaurin	498	2019	Present
Chris Cooley	429	2004	2012
Jerry Smith	421	1965	1977
Ricky Sanders	414	1986	1993
Bobby Mitchell	393	1962	1968
Pierre Garçon	376	2012	2016
Jordan Reed	329	2013	2018
Michael Westbrook	277	1995	2001
Hugh Taylor	272	1947	1954
Jamison Crowder	246	2015	2018
Don Warren	244	1979	1992
Larry Brown	238	1969	1976
Brian Mitchell	232	1990	1999
Rod Gardner	227	2001	2004
Henry Ellard	216	1994	1998
Chris Thompson	212	2013	2019
Roy Jefferson	208	1971	1976
Antwaan Randle El	186	2006	2009
Earnest Byner	185	1989	1993
Logan Thomas	184	2020	Present
Clinton Portis	176	2004	2010

Top 25 single-season (including ties)
Name	Rec.	Year
Pierre Garçon	113	2013
Art Monk	106	1984
Santana Moss	93	2010
Art Monk	91	1985
Laveranues Coles	90	2004
Terry McLaurin	87	2020
Jordan Reed	87	2015
Art Monk	86	1989
Santana Moss	84	2005
Chris Cooley	83	2008
Laveranues Coles	82	2003
Larry Centers	81	2000
J.D. McKissic	80	2020
Ricky Sanders	80	1989
Gary Clark	79	1989
Santana Moss	79	2008
Pierre Garcon	79	2016
Terry McLaurin	79	2023
Charlie Brown	78	1983
Chris Cooley	77	2010
Terry McLaurin	77	2021
Terry McLaurin	77	2022
Gary Clark	75	1990
Gary Clark	74	1986
Henry Ellard	74	1994

Top 5 single-game
Name	Rec.	Year	Opponent
Roy Helu	14	2011	San Francisco 49ers
Art Monk	13	1985	Cincinnati Bengals
Kelvin Bryant	13	1986	New York Giants
Art Monk	13	1990	Detroit Lions
Logan Thomas	13	2020	Seattle Seahawks

=== Receiving yards ===
Receiving yards

Top 25 career receiving yards
Name	Yards	Start	End
Art Monk	12,026	1980	1993
Charley Taylor	9,110	1964	1977
Gary Clark	8,742	1985	1992
Santana Moss	7,299	2005	2014
Terry McLaurin	6,961	2019	Present
Bobby Mitchell	6,492	1962	1968
Ricky Sanders	5,854	1986	1993
Jerry Smith	5,496	1965	1977
Hugh Taylor	5,233	1947	1954
Chris Cooley	4,711	2004	2012
Pierre Garcon	4,549	2012	2016
Michael Westbrook	4,280	1995	2001
Henry Ellard	3,930	1994	1998
Jordan Reed	3,371	2013	2019
Roy Jefferson	3,119	1971	1976
Rod Gardner	2,997	2001	2004
Bill Anderson	2,929	1958	1963
Jamison Crowder	2,859	2015	2024
Desean Jackson	2,702	2014	2016
Don Warren	2,536	1979	1992
Larry Brown	2,485	1969	1976
Albert Connell	2,483	1997	2000
Frank Grant	2,374	1973	1978
Antwaan Randle El	2,202	2006	2009
Laveranues Coles	2,154	2003	2004

Top 25 single-season
Name	Yards	Year
Santana Moss	1,483	2005
Bobby Mitchell	1,436	1963
Henry Ellard	1,397	1994
Bobby Mitchell	1,384	1962
Art Monk	1,372	1984
Pierre Garçon	1,346	2013
Gary Clark	1,340	1991
Gary Clark	1,265	1986
Gary Clark	1,229	1989
Art Monk	1,226	1985
Charlie Brown	1,225	1983
Laveranues Coles	1,204	2003
Terry McLaurin	1,191	2022
Michael Westbrook	1,191	1999
Art Monk	1,186	1989
Desean Jackson	1,169	2014
Ricky Sanders	1,148	1988
Ricky Sanders	1,138	1989
Albert Connell	1,132	1999
Charley Taylor	1,119	1966
Terry McLaurin	1,118	2020
Santana Moss	1,115	2010
Gary Clark	1,112	1990
Art Monk	1,068	1986
Gary Clark	1,066	1987

Top 9 single-game
Name	Yards	Year	Opponent
Anthony Allen	255	1987	St. Louis Cardinals
Gary Clark	241	1986	New York Giants
Art Monk	230	1985	Cincinnati Bengals
Bobby Mitchell	218	1963	Pittsburgh Steelers
Wilbur Moore	213	1943	Brooklyn Dodgers
Hugh Taylor	212	1947	Philadelphia Eagles
Albert Connell	211	2000	Jacksonville Jaguars
Rod Gardner	208	2001	Carolina Panthers
Gary Clark	203	1991	Atlanta Falcons

=== Receiving touchdowns ===
Touchdowns

Top 25 career receiving touchdowns (including ties)
Name	Rec. TD	Start	End
Charley Taylor	79	1964	1977
Art Monk	65	1980	1993
Santana Moss	64	2005	2013
Jerry Smith	60	1965	1977
Hugh Taylor	58	1947	1954
Gary Clark	58	1985	1992
Bobby Mitchell	49	1962	1968
Santana Moss	47	2005	2014
Ricky Sanders	36	1986	1993
Chris Cooley	33	2004	2011
Terry McLaurin	41	2019	Present
Michael Westbrook	24	1995	2001
Jordan Reed	24	2013	2018
Rod Gardner	22	2001	2004
Pierre Garcon	21	2012	2016
Jean Fugett	21	1976	1979
Dick Todd	20	1939	1948
Larry Brown	20	1969	1976
Charlie Brown	19	1982	1984
Clint Didier	19	1982	1987
Leslie Shepherd	18	1994	1998
Frank Grant	18	1973	1978
Pierre Garçon	18	2012	2026
Henry Ellard	17	1994	1998
Wilbur Moore	16	1939	1945
Roy Jefferson	16	1971	1976
Mike Sellers	16	1998	2011

Top 25 single-season receiving touchdowns (including ties)
Name	Rec. TD	Year
Hugh Taylor	12	1952
Jerry Smith	12	1967
Charley Taylor	12	1966
Ricky Sanders	12	1988
Bobby Mitchell	11	1962
Jordan Reed	11	2015
Bobby Mitchell	10	1964
Gary Clark	10	1991
Hugh Taylor	9	1950
Pat Richter	9	1968
Jerry Smith	9	1970
Hugh Taylor	9	1949
Jerry Smith	9	1969
Bobby Mitchell	9	1966
Michael Westbrook	9	1999
Charley Taylor	9	1967
Gary Clark	9	1989
Santana Moss	9	2005
Charlie Brown	8	1982
Hugh Taylor	8	1953
Hugh Taylor	8	1954
Frank Grant	8	1975
Charley Taylor	8	1970
Leslie Shepherd	8	1998
Chris Cooley	8	2007
Charley Taylor	8	1969
Art Monk	8	1991
Rod Gardner	8	2002
Gary Clark	8	1990
Charlie Brown	8	1983
Art Monk	8	1989
Santana Moss	8	2012

== Rushing ==
=== Rushes ===
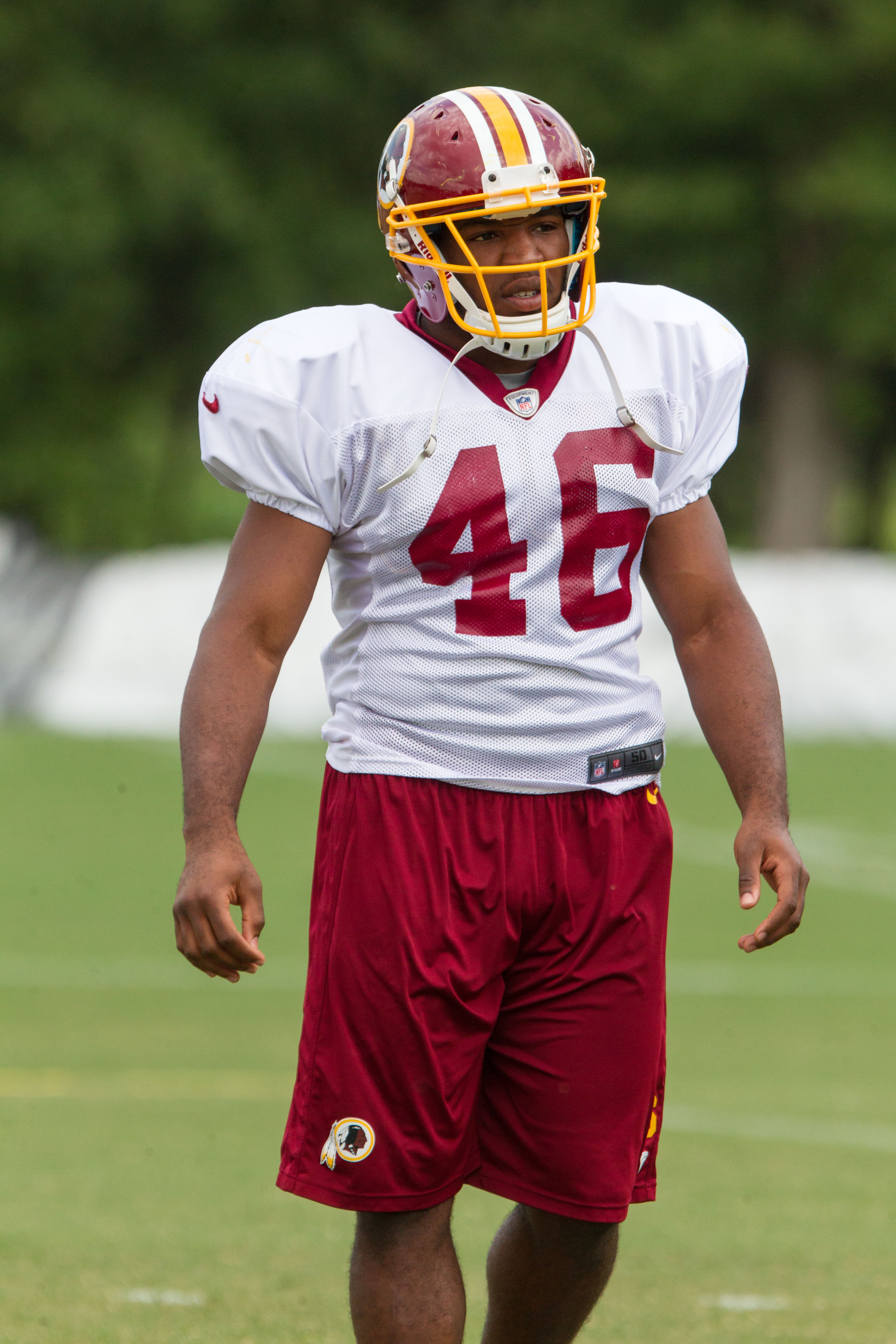
Alfred Morris is the recordholder for single-season rushing yards.

Rushes

Top 25 career
Name	Rushes	Start	End
John Riggins	1,988	1976	1985
Clinton Portis	1,667	2004	2010
Larry Brown	1,530	1969	1976
Stephen Davis	1,383	1996	2002
Alfred Morris	1,078	2012	2015
Terry Allen	1,043	1995	1998
Earnest Byner	990	1989	1993
Mike Thomas	878	1975	1978
Cliff Battles	839	1932	1937
Ladell Betts	776	2002	2009
Don Bosseler	775	1957	1964
Charley Harraway	719	1969	1973
George Rogers	697	1985	1987
Antonio Gibson	642	2020	2023
Brian Robinson Jr.	570	2022	2024
Andy Farkas	556	1938	1944
Ricky Ervins	531	1991	1994
Rob Goode	520	1949	1955
Adrian Peterson	462	2018	2019
Joe Washington	455	1981	1984
Dick James	447	1956	1963
Charley Taylor	442	1964	1974
Gerald Riggs	402	1989	1991
Dick Todd	368	1939	1948
Frank Filchock	362	1938	1945

Top 25 single-season
Name	Rushes	Year
John Riggins	375	1983
Stephen Davis	356	2001
Clinton Portis	352	2005
Terry Allen	347	1996
Clinton Portis	343	2004
Clinton Portis	342	2008
Terry Allen	338	1995
Alfred Morris	335	2012
Stephen Davis	332	2000
John Riggins	327	1984
Clinton Portis	325	2007
George Rogers	303	1986
Earnest Byner	297	1990
Stephen Davis	290	1999
Larry Brown	285	1972
Alfred Morris	276	2013
Earnest Byner	274	1991
Larry Brown	273	1973
Alfred Morris	265	2014
Earnest Byner	262	1992
John Riggins	260	1979
Antonio Gibson	258	2021
Mike Thomas	254	1976
Larry Brown	253	1971
Adrian Peterson	251	2018

=== Rushing yards ===
Rushing yards

Top 25 career
Name	Yards	Start	End
John Riggins	7,472	1976	1985
Clinton Portis	6,824	2004	2010
Larry Brown	5,875	1969	1976
Stephen Davis	5,790	1996	2002
Alfred Morris	4,713	2012	2015
Terry Allen	4,086	1995	1998
Earnest Byner	3,950	1989	1993
Cliff Battles	3,511	1932	1937
Mike Thomas	3,359	1975	1978
Ladell Betts	3,176	2002	2009
Don Bosseler	3,112	1957	1964
George Rogers	2,909	1985	1987
Charley Harraway	2,659	1969	1973
Antonio Gibson	2,643	2020	2023
Brian Robinson Jr.	2,329	2022	2024
Rob Goode	2,257	1949	1955
Joe Washington	2,070	1981	1984
Ricky Ervins	2,026	1991	1994
Andy Farkas	1,966	1938	1944
Adrian Peterson	1,940	2018	2019
Joe Theismann	1,815	1974	1985
Brian Mitchell	1,751	1990	1999
Dick James	1,741	1956	1963
Dick Todd	1,573	1939	1948
Gerald Riggs	1,557	1989	1991

Top 25 single-season
Name	Yards	Year
Alfred Morris	1,613	2012
Clinton Portis	1,516	2005
Clinton Portis	1,487	2008
Stephen Davis	1,432	2001
Stephen Davis	1,405	1999
Terry Allen	1,353	1996
John Riggins	1,347	1983
Stephen Davis	1,318	2000
Clinton Portis	1,315	2004
Terry Allen	1,309	1995
Alfred Morris	1,275	2013
Clinton Portis	1,262	2007
John Riggins	1,239	1984
Earnest Byner	1,219	1990
Larry Brown	1,216	1972
George Rogers	1,203	1986
Ladell Betts	1,154	2006
John Riggins	1,153	1979
Larry Brown	1,125	1970
Mike Thomas	1,101	1976
George Rogers	1,093	1985
Alfred Morris	1,074	2014
Reggie Brooks	1,063	1993
Earnest Byner	1,048	1991
Adrian Peterson	1,042	2018

Top 5 single-game
Name	Yards	Year	Opponent
Gerald Riggs	221	1989	Philadelphia Eagles
Cliff Battles	215	1933	New York Giants
George Rogers	206	1985	St. Louis Cardinals
Timmy Smith	204	1988	Denver Broncos
Alfred Morris	200	2012	Dallas Cowboys

=== Touchdowns ===
Touchdowns

Top 25 career
Name	TDs	Start	End
John Riggins	79	1976	1985
Clinton Portis	46	2004	2010
Stephen Davis	45	1996	2002
Terry Allen	37	1995	1998
Larry Brown	35	1969	1976
George Rogers	31	1985	1987
Alfred Morris	29	2012	2015
Earnest Byner	25	1989	1993
Cliff Battles	23	1932	1937
Don Bosseler	22	1957	1964
Antonio Gibson	22	2020	2023
Gerald Riggs	21	1989	1991
Andy Farkas	21	1938	1944
Charley Harraway	20	1969	1973
Joe Theismann	17	1974	1985
Dick James	16	1956	1963
Rob Goode	16	1949	1955
Mike Thomas	15	1975	1978
Ladell Betts	13	2002	2009
Kirk Cousins	13	2012	2017
Adrian Peterson	13	2018	2019
Skip Hicks	12	1998	2000
Bob Seymour	12	1940	1945
Dick Todd	11	1939	1948
Charley Taylor	11	1964	1974

Top 23 single-season
Name	TDs	Year
John Riggins	24	1983
Terry Allen	21	1996
George Rogers	18	1986
Stephen Davis	17	1999
John Riggins	14	1984
John Riggins	13	1981
Alfred Morris	13	2012
Clinton Portis	11	2007
Gerald Riggs	11	1991
Stephen Davis	11	2000
Clinton Portis	11	2005
Antonio Gibson	11	2020
Terry Allen	10	1995
Rob Goode	9	1951
Clinton Portis	9	2008
John Riggins	9	1979
Larry Brown	8	1973
Skip Hicks	8	1998
Larry Brown	8	1972
John Riggins	8	1985
Alfred Morris	8	2014
Don Bosseler	7	1957
Earnest Byner	7	1989
Stephen Davis	7	2002
Clinton Portis	7	2006
George Rogers	7	1985

== Kick and punt returning ==
=== Kick return yards ===
Kick return yards

Top 15 career total kick return yards
Name	Yards	Start	End
Brian Mitchell	9,586	1990	1999
Rock Cartwright	5,532	2002	2009
Mike Nelms	4,128	1980	1984
Dick James	3,949	1956	1963
Brandon Banks	2,856	2010	2012
Rickie Harris	2,326	1965	1970
Eddie Saenz	2,191	1946	1951
Ladell Betts	2,062	2002	2009
James Thrash	1,903	1997	2008
Larry Jones	1,816	1974	1977
Eddie Brown	1,590	1975	1977
Ken Jenkins	1,572	1985	1986
Herb Mul-Key	1,505	1972	1974
Chad Morton	1,387	2003	2004
Speedy Duncan	1,153	1971	1974

Top 15 single-season kick return yards
Name	Yards	Year'
Rock Cartwright	1,541	2006
Brian Mitchell	1,478	1994
Brian Mitchell	1,408	1995
Rock Cartwright	1,339	2007
Brian Mitchell	1,337	1998
Rock Cartwright	1,307	2008
Brian Mitchell	1,258	1996
Brandon Banks	1,174	2011
Brandon Banks	1,155	2010
Michael Bates	1,150	2001
Mike Nelms	1,099	1981
Brian Mitchell	1,094	1997
Larry Jones	1,086	1975
Chad Morton	1,029	2003
Ken Jenkins	1,018	1985

=== Yards per return ===
Yards per return

Top 15 career yards per kick return (including only players with at least 10 returns)
Name	Y/KR	Start	End
Alvin Haymond	29.1	1962	1968
Bobby Mitchell	28.5	1962	1968
Hall Haynes	28.1	1950	1953
Herb Mul-Key	27.9	1972	1974
Jim Kerr	27.5	1961	1962
Andy Farkas	27.3	1941	1944
Jim Steffen	26.3	1961	1963
Harry Dowda	26.2	1951	1951
Joe Scudero	26.0	1954	1958
Dale Atkeson	26.0	1954	1956
Tom Farmer	25.8	1947	1948
Steve Bagarus	25.8	1945	1948
Leroy Jackson	25.7	1962	1963
Tony Green	25.6	1978	1978
Dick James	25.5	1956	1963

Top 15 career yards per punt return (including only players with at least 10 returns)
Name	Y/PR	Start	End
Frank Filchock	16.3	1941	1945
Derrick Shepard	13.9	1987	1988
Bob Seymour	13.8	1941	1944
Bert Zagers	13.7	1955	1958
Dick Todd	13.2	1941	1948
Frank Seno	13.0	1943	1949
Johnny Williams	12.8	1952	1953
Eric Metcalf	12.5	2001	2001
Champ Bailey	12.1	2000	2002
Andy Farkas	12.1	1941	1944
Jim Youel	11.5	1946	1946
Dan Sandifer	11.4	1948	1949
Steve Bagarus	11.4	1945	1948
Darrell Green	11.3	1983	1997
Brian Mitchell	11.0	1990	1999

=== Return touchdowns ===
Return touchdowns

Top 15 career kick return touchdowns (including ties)
Name	TDs	Start	End
Eddie Saenz	2	1946	1951
Bobby Mitchell	2	1962	1968
Brian Mitchell	2	1990	1999
Andy Farkas	2	1938	1944
Dan Sandifer	1	1948	1989
James Thrash	1	1998	2007
Herb Mul-Key	1	1972	1974
Joe Johnson	1	1989	1991
Chad Morton	1	2003	2004
Dale Atkeson	1	1954	1956
Antonio Brown	1	2004	2005
Ray Hare	1	1941	1943
Rock Cartwright	1	2002	2008
Ladell Betts	1	2002	2007
John Love	1	1967	1967
Andy Farkas	1	1941	1944
Tony Green	1	1978	1978
Larry Jones	1	1974	1977
Joe Scudero	1	1954	1958

Top 15 career punt return touchdowns (including ties)
Name	TDs	Start	End
Brian Mitchell	7	1990	1999
Bert Zagers	3	1955	1958
Rickie Harris	3	1965	1970
Dick Todd	3	1939	1948
Johnny Williams	2	1952	1953
Mike Nelms	2	1980	1984
Ken Houston	1	1974	1974
Eddie Brown	1	1975	1977
Frank Filchock	1	1941	1945
Bill Dudley	1	1950	1953
Dick Todd	1	1941	1948
Joe Scudero	1	1954	1958
Jacquez Green	1	2002	2002
Andy Farkas	1	1941	1944
Desmond Howard	1	1992	1993
Larry Jones	1	1974	1977
Eric Metcalf	1	2001	2001
Antwaan Randle El	1	2006	2008
Tony Green	1	1978	1978
