= Houghton, Iowa =

- City
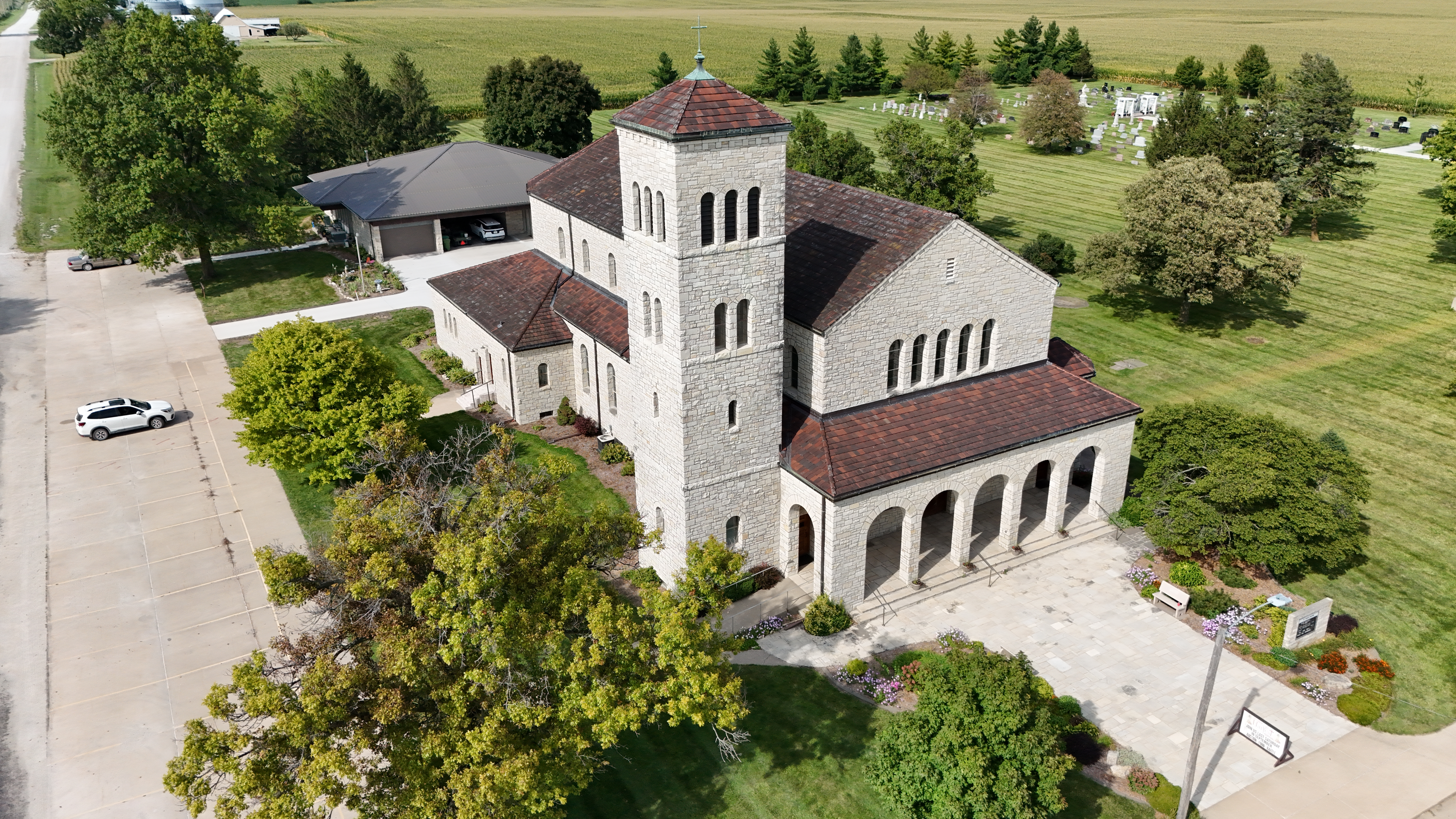
- St. John the Baptist Catholic Church in Houghton

- Location of Houghton, Iowa
- Coordinates: 40°47′01″N 91°36′36″W
- Country: USA
- State: Iowa
- County: Lee
- Incorporated: February 19, 1962

Area
  - Total: 0.30 sq mi (0.77 km^{2})
  - Land: 0.30 sq mi (0.77 km^{2})
  - Water: 0 sq mi (0.00 km^{2})
- Elevation: 719 ft (219 m)

Population (2020)
  - Total: 141
  - Density: 477.0/sq mi (184.16/km^{2})
- Time zone: UTC-6 (Central (CST))
  - Summer (DST): UTC-5 (CDT)
- ZIP code: 52631
- Area code: 319
- FIPS code: 19-37335
- GNIS feature ID: 2394424

Houghton is a city in Lee County, Iowa, United States. The population was 141 at the 2020 census. It is part of the Fort Madison-Keokuk Micropolitan Statistical Area.

== Geography ==
According to the United States Census Bureau, the city has a total area of 0.31 square miles (0.80 km^{2}), all land.

Houghton is located in Cedar Township and was positioned on the Chicago, Burlington and Quincy Railroad.

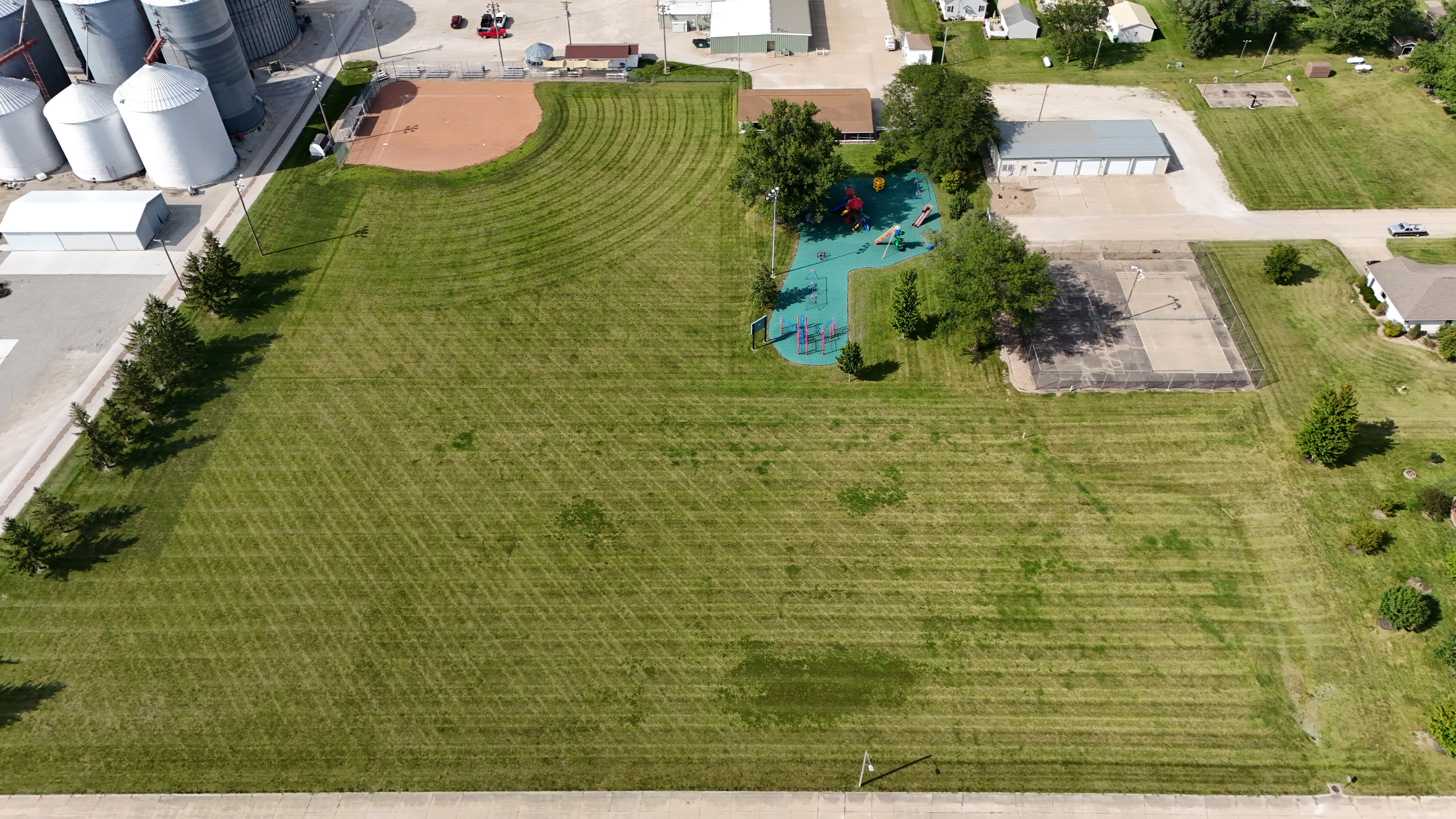
A city park in Houghton

== Economy ==
The town has more manufacturing jobs than population, which is rare—doubly rare because there are no other towns nearby to supply additional labor. There are a half-dozen plants that account for this, making plastic products, grain storage bins and ready-mix concrete. Houghton was once the junction of two rail lines, both now abandoned, which may have something to do with the origin of its industry. Nevertheless, St. Johns Catholic Church is the most substantial building in town.

== Demographics ==
Historical populations
Year	Pop.	±%
1970	119	—
1980	124	+4.2%
1990	127	+2.4%
2000	130	+2.4%
2010	146	+12.3%
2020	141	−3.4%
Source:"U.S. Census website". United States Census Bureau. and Iowa Data Center; Source: U.S. Decennial Census

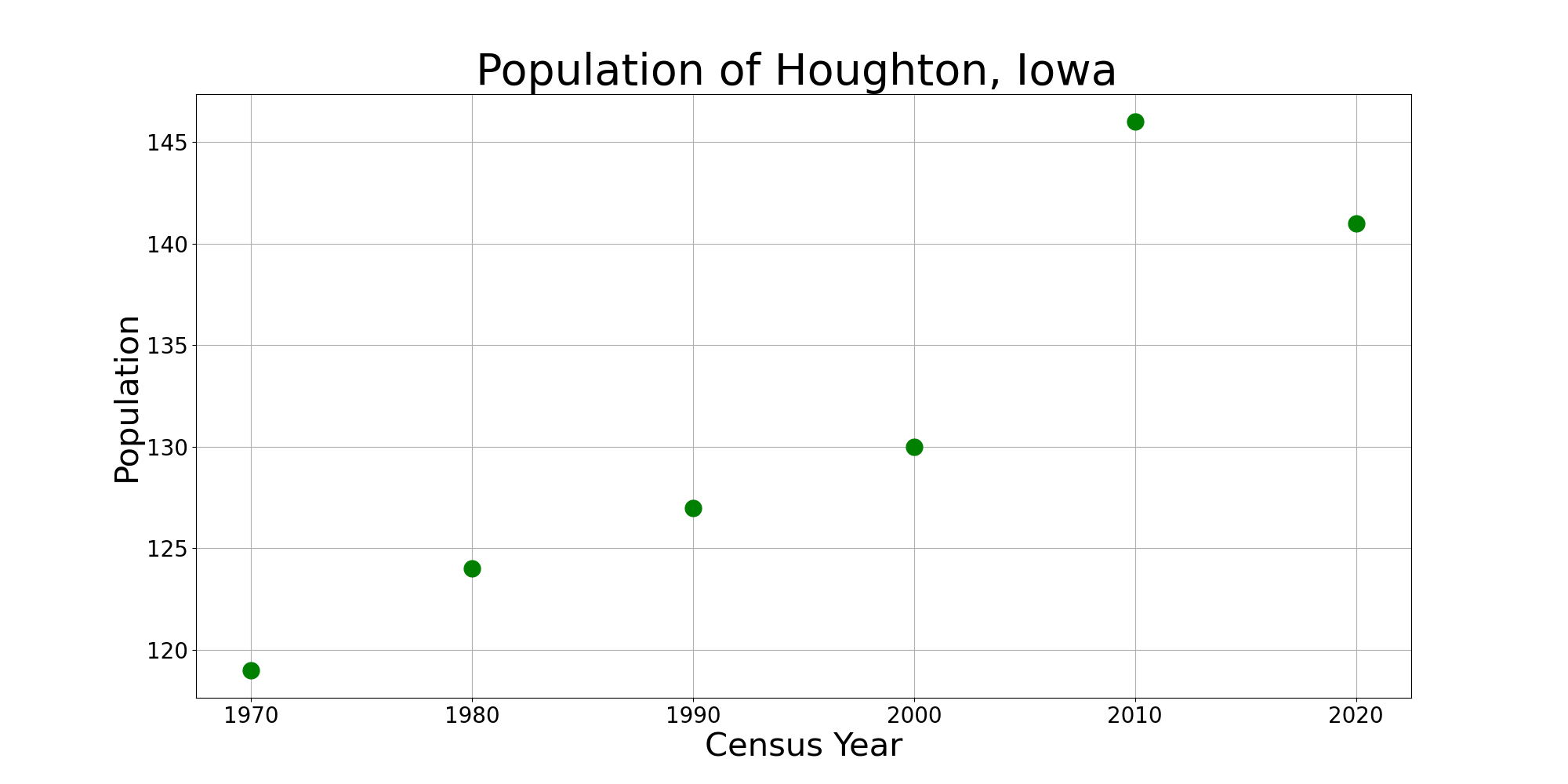
The population of Houghton, Iowa from US census data

=== 2020 census ===
As of the census of 2020, there were 141 people, 59 households, and 46 families residing in the city. The population density was 477.0 inhabitants per square mile (184.2/km^{2}). There were 59 housing units at an average density of 199.6 per square mile (77.1/km^{2}). The racial makeup of the city was 92.2% White, 0.0% Black or African American, 1.4% Native American, 0.0% Asian, 0.0% Pacific Islander, 0.0% from other races and 6.4% from two or more races. Hispanic or Latino persons of any race comprised 2.1% of the population.

Of the 59 households, 30.5% of which had children under the age of 18 living with them, 67.8% were married couples living together, 5.1% were cohabitating couples, 11.9% had a female householder with no spouse or partner present and 15.3% had a male householder with no spouse or partner present. 22.0% of all households were non-families. 20.3% of all households were made up of individuals, 5.1% had someone living alone who was 65 years old or older.

The median age in the city was 55.1 years. 22.0% of the residents were under the age of 20; 6.4% were between the ages of 20 and 24; 14.2% were from 25 and 44; 24.1% were from 45 and 64; and 33.3% were 65 years of age or older. The gender makeup of the city was 51.8% male and 48.2% female.

=== 2010 census ===
As of the census of 2010, there were 146 people, 62 households, and 47 families living in the city. The population density was 471.0 inhabitants per square mile (181.9/km^{2}). There were 64 housing units at an average density of 206.5 per square mile (79.7/km^{2}). The racial makeup of the city was 100.0% White.

There were 62 households, of which 27.4% had children under the age of 18 living with them, 71.0% were married couples living together, 3.2% had a female householder with no husband present, 1.6% had a male householder with no wife present, and 24.2% were non-families. 21.0% of all households were made up of individuals, and 9.7% had someone living alone who was 65 years of age or older. The average household size was 2.35 and the average family size was 2.74.

The median age in the city was 48 years. 19.9% of residents were under the age of 18; 4.8% were between the ages of 18 and 24; 21.2% were from 25 to 44; 33.5% were from 45 to 64; and 20.5% were 65 years of age or older. The gender makeup of the city was 46.6% male and 53.4% female.

=== 2000 census ===
As of the census of 2000, there were 130 people, 54 households, and 42 families living in the city. The population density was 431.1 inhabitants per square mile (166.4/km^{2}). There were 61 housing units at an average density of 202.3 per square mile (78.1/km^{2}). The racial makeup of the city was 100.00% White, and no people in the city were Hispanic or Latino of any race.

There were 54 households, out of which 33.3% had children under the age of 18 living with them, 70.4% were married couples living together, 3.7% had a female householder with no husband present, and 22.2% were non-families. 22.2% of all households were made up of individuals, and 13.0% had someone living alone who was 65 years of age or older. The average household size was 2.39 and the average family size was 2.79.

Population spread: 24.6% under the age of 18, 2.3% from 18 to 24, 23.1% from 25 to 44, 29.2% from 45 to 64, and 20.8% who were 65 years of age or older. The median age was 44 years. For every 100 females, there were 91.2 males. For every 100 females age 18 and over, there were 96.0 males.

The median income for a household in the city was $47,500, and the median income for a family was $54,375. Males had a median income of $31,042 versus $16,750 for females. The per capita income for the city was $19,203. There were no families and 3.1% of the population living below the poverty line, including no under eighteens and none of those over 64.

== Education ==
Fort Madison Community School District serves the city; its high school is Fort Madison High School.

Previously the Marquette Catholic School System maintained its elementary school in Houghton; in 2005 it merged into the Holy Trinity Catholic Schools system, which has preschools in St. Paul and Fort Madison, an elementary school in West Point and a secondary school in St. Paul.
