= Asa Turner =

American minister (1799–1885)

Asa Turner (June 11, 1799 – December 12, 1885) was an American Congregationalist minister and abolitionist. He was a reformer who was prominent in Iowa's abolitionist, civil rights, and temperance movements in the 1840s and 1850s. He organized the antislavery coalition that became the Republican Party in Iowa.

== Biography ==
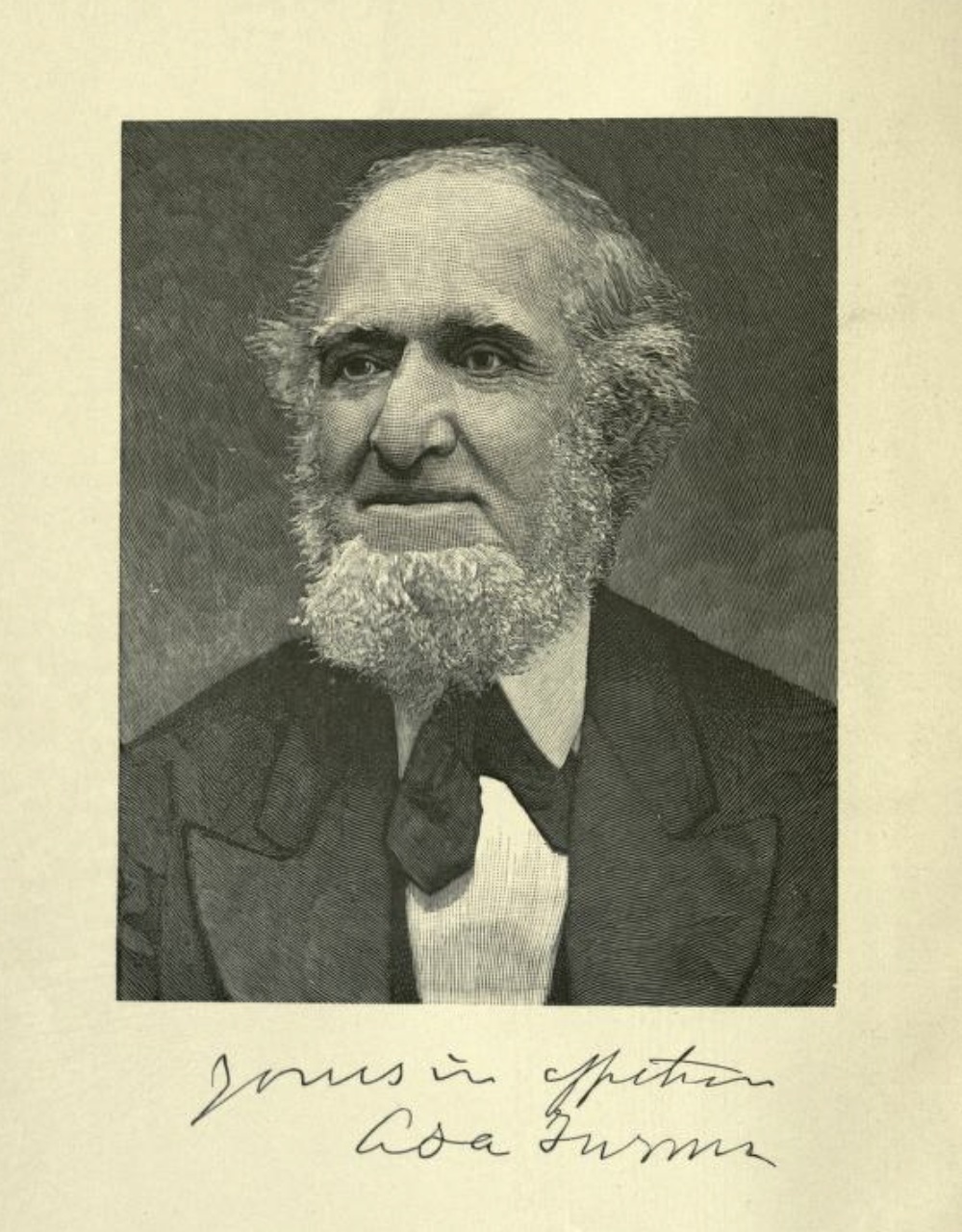
"Yours with affection, Asa Turner"

Turner, son of Asa and Abigail (Baldwin) Turner, and brother of Jonathan Baldwin Turner, was born in Templeton, Mass., June 11, 1799. After being converted, at a mature age, he turned his steps towards Yale College, where he graduated in 1827. Immediately on graduation he entered the Yale Theological Seminary, and there early in 1829 united with others in the formation of the "Illinois Association", the members of which pledged themselves to the cause of religion and education in the young State of Illinois.

Turner finished his preparation in 1830, and on September 6 was ordained in New Haven as an evangelist. The week before (August 30), he married Martha, the youngest daughter of Isaac D. Bull, of Hartford, Conn. On November 5, they arrived at Quincy, Illinois, where he organized a Congregational Church a month later. He continued in abundant and successful labors in this vicinity until July, 1838, when he removed to Denmark, Iowa, where he had two months before gathered the first Congregational Church in that Territory, the Denmark Congregational United Church of Christ.

He continued his pioneer work in Denmark and its neighborhood with rare energy and wisdom until October, 1869, when, in accordance with his settled intention he retired from active life, at the age of 70. After resigning his pastorate, "Father Turner," as he was familiarly called, moved to Oskaloosa, Iowa, where his remaining years were spent in the home of a married daughter. He died in Oskaloosa, December 12, 1885, in his 87th year.

Of his eleven children, one son was graduated Yale in 1858.
