= Aquinas Schools =

Aquinas Schools, also known as Fort Madison Catholic Schools, was a Roman Catholic school in Fort Madison, Iowa.

== History ==
Campuses in Fort Madison

In 1997 it had the following campuses: Happy World Preschool and Aquinas East Elementary School, Aquinas West Middle School, and Aquinas Junior-Senior High School; the high school housed the administrative offices of the system. It had the same campuses in 2004, before the school's merger, as Aquinas East Primary, Aquinas West Middle, and Aquinas High School, with the headquarters at the high school.

In 2005 Aquinas Schools merged with the Marquette Catholic School System of West Point to form Holy Trinity Catholic Schools. Doris Turner, who began as principal of the Aquinas system circa 2003, became the principal of Holy Trinity after the merger. The Marquette building was chosen for junior high school while the Aquinas building was chosen for senior high school. At the time 131 students were at the secondary level in Aquinas. The merger was due to increasing costs and the declining population of Lee County, the latter of which meant reduced numbers of pupils.

kik a_ss

== Notable alumni ==
- Jeff Kurtz, member of the Iowa House of Representatives (class of 1972)
