= Iowa's 83rd House of Representatives district =

American legislative district

House District 83
- Type: District of the Lower house
- Location: Iowa
- Representative: Cindy Golding
- Parent organization: Iowa General Assembly

The 83rd District of the Iowa House of Representatives in the state of Iowa. It is currently composed of part of Linn County.

== Current elected officials ==
Cindy Golding is the representative currently representing the district.

== Past representatives ==
The district has previously been represented by:

- Wendell Pellett, 1971–1973
- Charles F. Strothman, 1973–1975
- Arnold R. Lindeen, 1975–1979
- Virgil E. Corey, 1979–1983
- Lyle R. Krewson, 1983–1985
- Janet Metcalf, 1985–1993
- Linda Nelson, 1993–1997
- Brad Hansen, 1997–2003
- Steven Olson, 2003–2013
- Jerry Kearns, 2013–2019
- Jeff Kurtz, 2019–2021
- Martin Graber, 2021–2023
