= Jeff Kurtz =

American politician (born 1954)

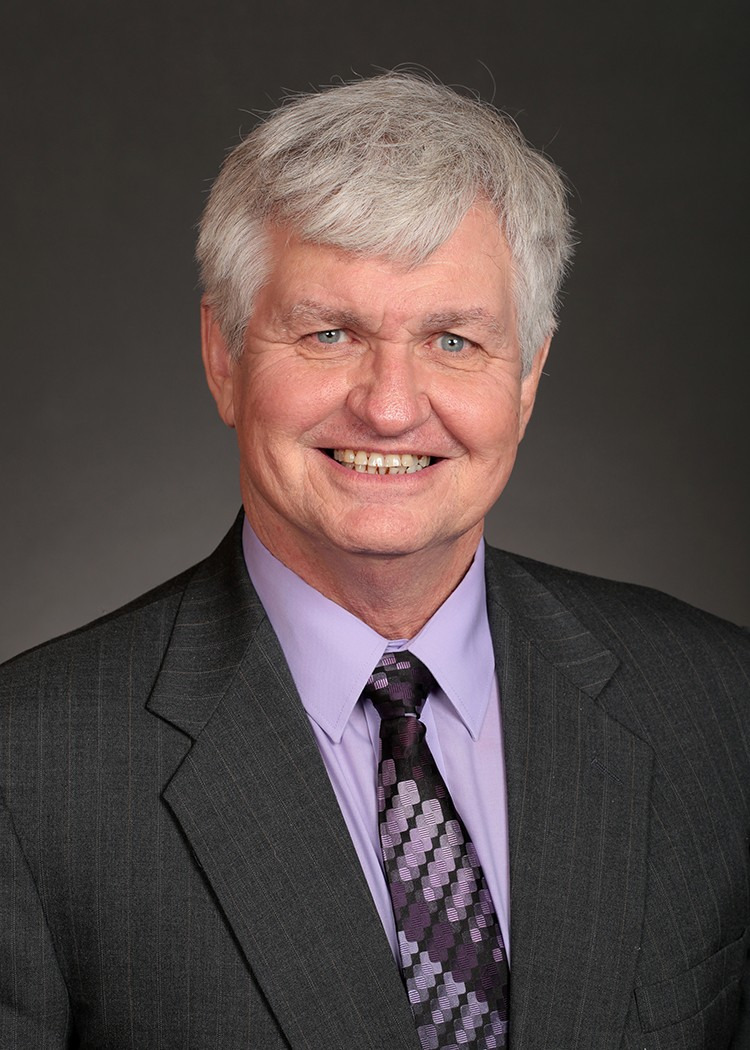
- Kurtz in 2019

Member of the Iowa House of Representatives from the 83rd district
- In office January 14, 2019 – January 10, 2021
- Preceded by: Jerry Kearns
- Succeeded by: Martin Graber

Personal details
- Born: 1954 (age 71–72) Fort Madison, Iowa, U.S.
- Party: Democratic
- Spouse: Debbie
- Children: 3
- Education: Southeastern Community College; Iowa State University

Jeff Kurtz (born 1954) is an American politician and retired locomotive engineer who represented the 83rd district of the Iowa House of Representatives from 2019 to 2021, which at the time consisted of parts of southern Lee County, including all of Fort Madison and Keokuk. He is a member of the Democratic Party.

== Early life ==
Kurtz was born in 1954 in Fort Madison, Iowa. He graduated from Aquinas High School in 1972. He attended Southeastern Community College and Iowa State University. He joined the Santa Fe Railroad as a fireman in 1974.

== Political career ==
Kurtz announced his candidacy for the 83rd district of the Iowa House of Representatives in 2018 after incumbent Jerry Kearns announced he would not seek reelection. He won the Democratic primaries on June 5, 2018, with over 56 percent of the vote, and defeated Republican Jeff Reichman in the general election on November 6 by over 800 votes. He was subsequently appointed to the Labor, Public Safety, Transportation, and Ways and Means committees.

Kurtz endorsed Bernie Sanders for president in 2019.

Kurtz ran for reelection in 2020 but lost to Republican Martin Graber by over 700 votes.

== Personal life ==
Kurtz has a wife, Debbie, and three adult children. He resides in Fort Madison.

Kurtz worked as a locomotive engineer with BNSF from 1975 to 2014. He has been a member of the Brotherhood of Locomotive Engineers and Trainmen (BLET) for over 40 years, and served as president of BLET Local 391 for eight years, chairman of the BLET Iowa State Legislative Board for ten years, and BLET Legislative and Safety Director for ten years.

== Electoral history ==
* = incumbent

Election	Political result	Candidate	Party	Votes	%
Iowa House of Representatives Democratic primary elections, 2018; District 83; Turnout: 1,633	Democratic	Jeff Kurtz	Democratic	923	56.5
Iowa House of Representatives Democratic primary elections, 2018; District 83; Turnout: 1,633	Democratic	Bob Morawitz	Democratic	561	34.4
Iowa House of Representatives Democratic primary elections, 2018; District 83; Turnout: 1,633	Democratic	Michael Hardy	Democratic	146	8.9
Iowa House of Representatives Democratic primary elections, 2018; District 83; Turnout: 1,633	Democratic	Other/Write-in votes		3	0.2
Iowa House of Representatives general elections, 2018; District 83; Turnout: 10,274	Democratic	Jeff Kurtz	Democratic	5,552	54
Iowa House of Representatives general elections, 2018; District 83; Turnout: 10,274	Democratic	Jeff Reichman	Republican	4,705	45.8
Iowa House of Representatives general elections, 2018; District 83; Turnout: 10,274	Democratic	Other/Write-in votes		17	0.2
Iowa House of Representatives Democratic primary elections, 2020; District 83; Turnout: 2,285	Democratic	Jeff Kurtz	Democratic	2,281	99.8
Iowa House of Representatives Democratic primary elections, 2020; District 83; Turnout: 2,285	Democratic	Other/Write-in votes		4	0.2
Iowa House of Representatives general elections, 2020; District 83; Turnout: 13,175	Republican	Martin Graber	Republican	6,967	52.9
Iowa House of Representatives general elections, 2020; District 83; Turnout: 13,175	Republican	Jeff Kurtz*	Democratic	6,197	47
Iowa House of Representatives general elections, 2020; District 83; Turnout: 13,175	Republican	Other/Write-in votes		11	0.1
