= Cindy Golding =

American politician (born 1952)

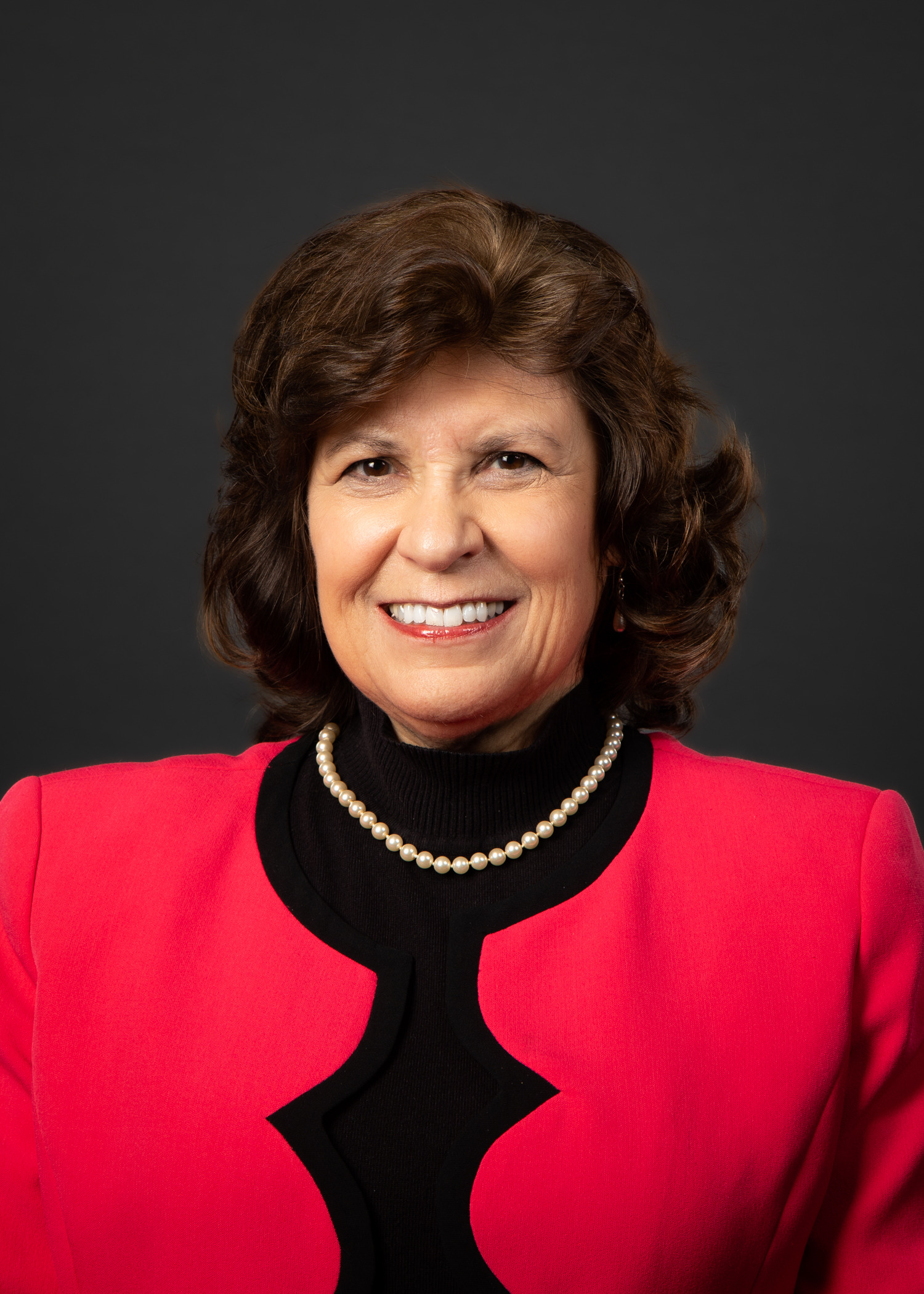

Member of the Iowa House of Representatives from the 83rd district
- Incumbent
- Assumed office January 9, 2023
- Preceded by: Martin Graber (redistricting)

Personal details
- Born: 1952 (age 73–74) Chicago, Illinois, U.S.
- Party: Republican
- Spouse: Joe
- Children: 6
- Education: Northern Illinois University; Elmhurst University
- Occupation: Small business owner, farmer

Cindy Golding (born 1952) is an American politician, entrepreneur, farmer and former chemist who has represented the 83rd district of the Iowa House of Representatives since January 2023, which consists of much of rural Linn County. She is a member of the Republican Party.

== Early life ==
Golding was born in 1952 in Chicago, and was raised in rural northern Illinois. She went to Northern Illinois University before attending Elmhurst University, where she majored in biochemistry.

== Political career ==
Golding ran for the 18th district of the Iowa Senate in a special election in 2011 to fill a vacancy left by Swati Dandekar's resignation, but lost to Democrat Liz Mathis.

Golding announced her candidacy for the 83rd district of the Iowa House of Representatives shortly after decennial redistricting took place in 2021. She won the Republican primaries unopposed on June 7, 2022, and defeated Democrat Kris Nall in the general election on November 8 by over 2,800 votes.

Golding endorsed Donald Trump for president in 2023.

In 2024, Golding filed to run for reelection. She won the Republican primaries unopposed on June 4, 2024, and defeated Democrat Kent McNally in the general election on November 5, 2024, receiving 11,321 votes (58.72%) to McNally's 7,947 (41.21%).

Golding currently serves on the Labor and Workforce, Veterans Affairs, State Government, and Local Government committees, the lattermost of which she is vice chair.

== Personal life ==
Golding has a husband, Joe, six adult children, and 21 grandchildren. She resides in rural Linn County. She is the co-founder of Advancement Resources, a training services and research company, and also owns several farms. She worked as an analytical chemist prior to her business ventures.

Golding has been active in numerous organizations. She is the former chair of the Linn County Republican Party Central Committee and Heartland Youth for Christ, former second vice president of the Iowa Federation of Republican Women, and is a former board member of the National Federation of Independent Business, Five Seasons Republican Women, Linn County Farm Bureau, and Hawkeye Area Community Action Program. She has also worked as an FFA judge, cheerleading coach, Academic Decathlon coach and judge, Chemistry Olympiad proctor, Mathcounts coach, church youth leader, and Boy Scout and Girl Scout leader.

== Electoral history ==
Election	Political result	Candidate	Party	Votes	%
Iowa Senate special election, 2011; District 18; Turnout: 23,797	Democratic	Liz Mathis	Democratic	13,324	56
Iowa Senate special election, 2011; District 18; Turnout: 23,797	Democratic	Cindy Golding	Republican	10,322	43.4
Iowa Senate special election, 2011; District 18; Turnout: 23,797	Democratic	Jon Tack	Constitution	151	0.6
Iowa House of Representatives Republican primary elections, 2022; District 83; Turnout: 1,717	Republican (newly redistricted)	Cindy Golding	Republican	1,706	99.4
Iowa House of Representatives Republican primary elections, 2022; District 83; Turnout: 1,717	Republican (newly redistricted)	Other/Write-in votes		11	0.6
Iowa House of Representatives general elections, 2022; District 83; Turnout: 15,529	Republican (newly redistricted)	Cindy Golding	Republican	9,172	59.1
Iowa House of Representatives general elections, 2022; District 83; Turnout: 15,529	Republican (newly redistricted)	Kris Nall	Democratic	6,350	40.9
Iowa House of Representatives general elections, 2022; District 83; Turnout: 15,529	Republican (newly redistricted)	Other/Write-in votes		7	0.05
