= Roy Helu =

American football player (born 1988)

Roy Helu Jr.
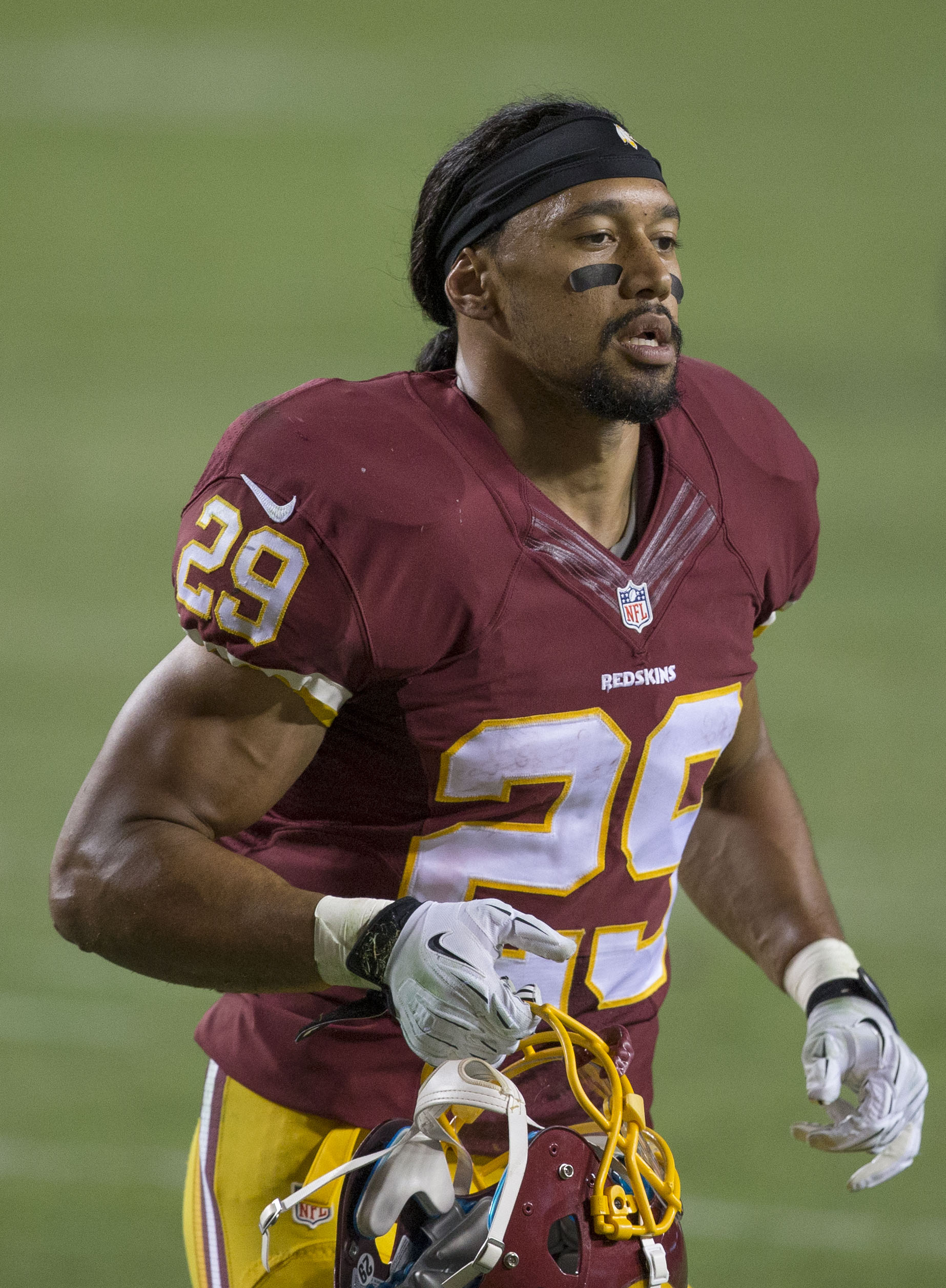
- Helu with the Washington Redskins in 2014

No. 26, 29
- Position: Running back

Personal information
- Born: December 7, 1988 (age 37); Danville, California, U.S.
- Listed height: 5 ft 11 in (1.80 m)
- Listed weight: 220 lb (100 kg)

Career information
- High school: San Ramon Valley (Danville)
- College: Nebraska (2007–2010)
- NFL draft: 2011: 4th round, 105th overall pick

Career history
- Washington Redskins (2011–2014); Oakland Raiders (2015)

Awards and highlights
- PFWA All-Rookie Team (2011); 2× Second-team All-Big 12 (2009, 2010)

Career NFL statistics
- Rushing attempts: 272
- Rushing yards: 1,171
- Rushing touchdowns: 7
- Receptions: 138
- Receiving yards: 1,227
- Receiving touchdowns: 4
- Stats at Pro Football Reference

Roy Ziegler Helu Jr. (born December 7, 1988) is an American former professional football player who was a running back in the National Football League (NFL). He was selected by the Washington Redskins in the fourth round of the 2011 NFL draft. He played college football for the Nebraska Cornhuskers.

Helu set the Redskins' franchise record of most receptions in single game with 14 catches in a game against the San Francisco 49ers in 2011.

== Early life ==
Helu played high school football at San Ramon Valley High School.

In his junior year at San Ramon Valley, Helu ran for 1,526 yards rushing and scored 19 touchdowns on 186 carries, and averaged 8.6 yards per carry. He also had 30 receptions for 500 yards receiving and four touchdowns, which earned him All-East Bay League honors.

During Helu's senior year, he helped San Ramon Valley to a 10–2 record in 2006. He finished his senior year with 1,085 yards rushing and 11 touchdowns. He had 300 yards receiving on 20 receptions and 1 touchdown, and also recorded one interception as a free safety. He earned first-team all-league honors his senior year as a running back.

== College career ==
Helu with Nebraska in 2010

Despite fighting injuries, Helu rushed for over 1,000 yards each of his last two years at Nebraska. By the time he graduated in 2011, he was 4th on the Huskers all-time rushing list, and broke Nebraska's single-game rushing record by rushing for 307 yards and scoring three touchdowns against Missouri on October 30, 2010.

=== College statistics ===
Year	Team	Att	Yards	Average	TDs	Receptions	Yards	Average	TDs
2007	Nebraska	45	209	4.6	0	5	40	8.0	0
2008	Nebraska	125	803	6.4	7	25	266	10.6	0
2009	Nebraska	220	1,147	5.2	10	19	149	7.8	0
2010	Nebraska	188	1,245	6.6	11	5	46	9.2	0
Career		578	3,404	5.9	28	54	501	9.3	0

== Professional career ==
Pre-draft measurables
Height	Weight	Arm length	Hand span	Wingspan	40-yard dash	10-yard split	20-yard split	20-yard shuttle	Three-cone drill	Vertical jump	Broad jump	Bench press
5 ft 11 1/2 in (1.82 m)	219 lb (99 kg)	31 3/8 in (0.80 m)	10 1/4 in (0.26 m)	6 ft 3 7/8 in (1.93 m)	4.44 s	1.50 s	2.64 s	4.01 s	6.67 s	36.5 in (0.93 m)	9 ft 11 in (3.02 m)	11 reps
All values from NFL Combine

=== Washington Redskins ===
==== 2011 season ====
Helu was selected in the fourth round with the 105th overall pick in the 2011 NFL draft by the Washington Redskins. He would later be joined by Nebraska teammates, DeJon Gomes and Niles Paul, who were drafted after him. On November 6, 2011, in his first career start, Helu broke the Redskins all-time record for receptions in a game with 14 catches, in a loss against the San Francisco 49ers. The following two weeks, in losses to Miami and Dallas, Helu had a combined 14 rushes and five receptions as Coach Mike Shanahan split running back duties between Helu and Ryan Torain. Coach Shanahan said, “I like Helu, he’s doing some great things. I don’t want to put too much pressure on him too early. He’s not ready for that. But he’s gaining experience, and I like what I see.”

On November 27, 2011, Helu rushed for a Redskins rookie-record 108 yards on 23 carries and a touchdown against the Seattle Seahawks' top-ten ranked run defense. While running for a touchdown, he hurdled Seahawks cornerback, Roy Lewis. He was then named the full-time starter by Coach Shanahan, and responded with two consecutive 100 yard performances. Following his 126-yard performance against the New England Patriots, Helu led all active rookies in rush yards. His streak of three consecutive 100 yard games is the most by any Redskins rookie in franchise history; a record he was unable to extend to four games due to an injury he sustained.

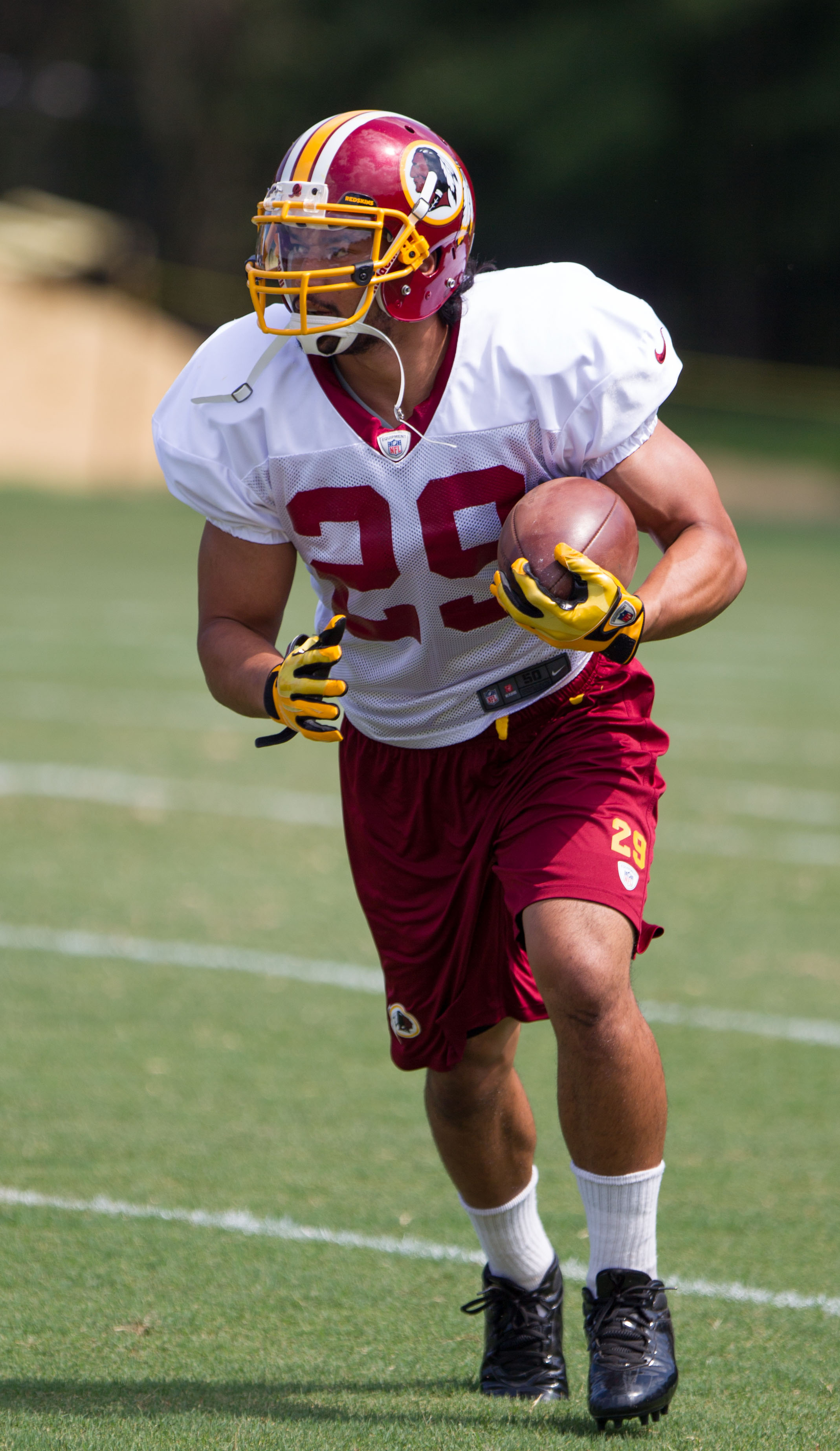
Helu at Redskins 2012 training camp

Helu finished with 151 carries for 640 rushing yards and two rushing touchdowns to go along with 49 receptions for 379 receiving yards and one receiving touchdown. At the end of the 2011 NFL season, Helu was Redskins' leader in rushing yards. On January 16, 2012, Helu along with fellow rookie, Ryan Kerrigan, were named to the Pro Football Weekly/Pro Football Writers of America all-rookie team.

==== 2012 season ====
After the NFL changed the rule in 2012 to allow players' jerseys to include generational titles in their names, Helu adopted "Jr." to the back of his jersey. He was expected to compete for the starting spot in the 2012 season against Tim Hightower and Evan Royster, but ended up losing the competition to rookie Alfred Morris. His second season was cut short after being placed on injured reserve on September 26, 2012, due to lower leg injuries and turf toe. He finished the season with two carries for two rushing yards and 45 receiving yards on seven receptions.

==== 2013 season ====
Helu returned from injury and secured his place as the second string running back behind Morris during the 2013 preseason. In a 45–41 Week 7 win against the Chicago Bears, he recorded his first multi-scoring game, recording three touchdowns. He appeared in all 16 games. He finished with 62 carries for 274 rushing yards and four rushing touchdowns to go along with 31 receptions for 251 receiving yards.

==== 2014 season ====
In 2014, Helu had almost no competition for the second-string running back job, and won it easily over fellow running backs Silas Redd, Evan Royster, Chris Thompson, and Lache Seastrunk. In the 2014 season, he appeared in 14 games. He finished with 40 carries for 216 rushing yards and one rushing touchdown to go along with 42 receptions for 477 receiving yards and two receiving touchdowns.

=== Oakland Raiders ===
On March 10, 2015, Helu signed a two-year contract worth over $4 million with the Oakland Raiders. In the 2015 season, Helu appeared in nine games. He had 17 carries for 39 rushing yards to go along with nine receptions for 75 receiving yards and one receiving touchdown.

Helu was placed on the team's injured reserve list on July 29, 2016, ending his season, and was waived from the team a few days later.

== Personal life ==
Helu (pronounced HEH-loo) was born to Roy Helu Sr. and Kilistofa (Kristi) Helu on December 7, 1988, in Danville, California. His father played rugby for the United States national rugby union team.

He is married to retired professional volleyball player and fellow Nebraska Cornhusker alum, Dani Mancuso.

Helu is of Tongan descent. He is a devout Christian.
