= Holy Trinity Catholic Schools =

Location
- Secondary: 2600 Ave. A Fort Madison, IA 52627; Elementary and West Point EC: 413 Ave C West Point, IA 52656; Fort Madison EC: 2213 Avenue J Fort Madison, Iowa 52627; United States; 40°38′12″N 91°20′34″W

Information
- Type: Private, Coeducational
- Motto: "Develop the total person spiritually, mentally, socially and physically to be a successful contributing member of our society in the Catholic tradition."
- Religious affiliation: Roman Catholic
- Established: 2005
- Superintendent: Lynne Devaney
- Grades: PreK–12
- Colors: Royal Blue and Silver
- Athletics conference: Southeast Iowa Superconference; South Division
- Mascot: Crusaders
- Affiliation(s): (Boys' sports) IHSAA and (Girls' Sports) IGHSAU
- Website: http://holytrinityschools.org

Holy Trinity Catholic Schools also known as HTC, is a PK-12 Roman Catholic school headquartered in Fort Madison, Iowa, with campuses in Fort Madison and West Point. Fort Madison has the secondary school campus and one early childhood campus, while West Point has the elementary school and an early childhood center on another campus. The school system is located in the Roman Catholic Diocese of Davenport.

Campuses in Lee County, Iowa

== History ==
Holy Trinity Catholic School was created in July 2005 with the merging of the Marquette Catholic School System from the West Point Area and the Aquinas Catholic Schools from the Fort Madison Area. The Marquette building was chosen for junior high school while the Aquinas building was chosen for senior high school. At the time 131 students were at the secondary level in Aquinas. The merger was due to increasing costs and the declining population of Lee County, the latter of which meant reduced numbers of pupils. The school received a different set of school colors and mascot, and the school administration allowed parents and students to have a say.

In 2006 Cardinal Stritch High School of Keokuk merged into Holy Trinity High School.

Principal Doris Turner, the first principal since the consolidation, retired in 2011.

In 2017 the school scheduled a renovation of the high school area, refurbishing the electrical systems and installing solar panels.

A new elementary school building in West Point was completed in 2019.

Previously a preschool was in St. Paul.

== Athletics ==
The Crusaders compete in the Southeast Iowa Superconference (South Division), in the following sports:

- Girls' Volleyball
- Boys' & Girls' Basketball
- Boys' & Girls' Golf
- Girls' Softball

The Crusaders send their athletes to the following schools to compete in the Southeast Conference in the following sport(s):

Keokuk:

- Boys' & Girls' Bowling

Burlington:

- Boys' & Girls' Swimming

Fort Madison:

- Boys' Baseball
- Boys' & Girls' Cross Country
- Boys' & Girls' Soccer
- Boys' & Girls' Tennis
- Boys' & Girls' Track and Field
- Boys' & Girls' Wrestling

For American Football, the Crusaders send their athletes to Central Lee to compete in Iowa Class 2A District 6 (As of 2025).
