= Frank Leverett =

American geologist (1859–1943)

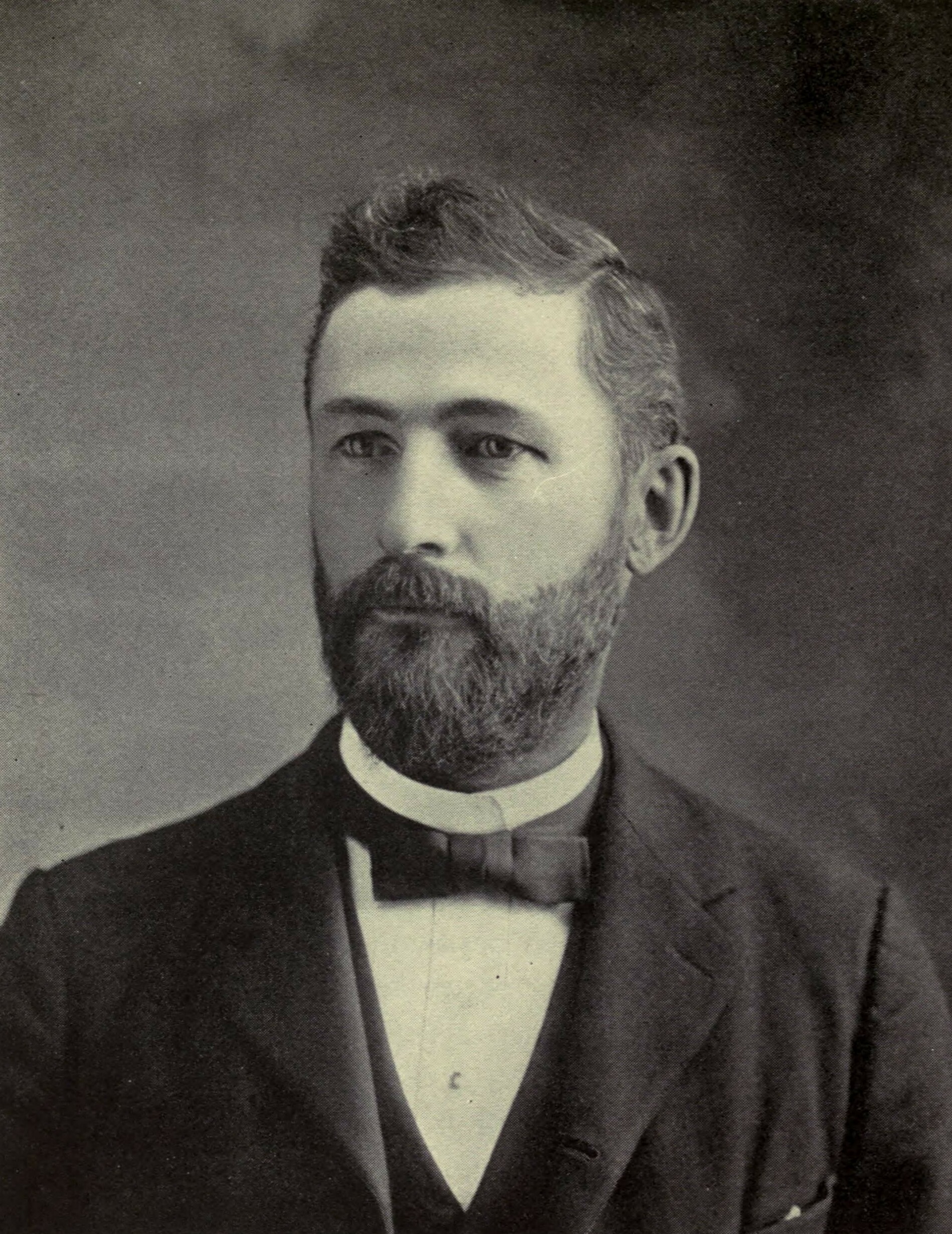
- Born: March 10, 1859; Denmark, Iowa
- Died: November 15, 1943 (aged 84); Ann Arbor, Michigan
- Scientific career
- Fields: Glaciology
- Workplaces: United States Geological Survey; University of Michigan

Frank Leverett (March 10, 1859 – November 15, 1943) was an American geologist who specialized in glaciology.

== Biography ==
Frank Leverett was born on March 10, 1859, in Denmark, Iowa, and was descended from a family that emigrated from Boston, Lincolnshire in 1663. Following an education in Denmark Academy from which he expected to become a farmer, Leverett taught in public schools for a year in 1878 before becoming an instructor in natural sciences at the academy for the following three years. Here he became interested in geology and so enrolled in Colorado College and subsequently Iowa State College of Agriculture and Mechanic Arts to study mineralogy and assaying, graduating with a bachelor of science from the latter in 1885. He then began work in a temporary job in Madison, Wisconsin, working with the United States Geological Survey. Leverett continued as an assistant until 1890 when he was given the position of assistant geologist, before becoming a geologist in 1901 and a senior geologist in 1928, until his retirement in 1929. Between 1909 and 1929 Leverett was a lecturer in glacial geology at the University of Michigan, the institution which awarded him an honorary degree of doctor of science in 1930.

Leverett was one of the leading authorities on Pleistocene glaciation and authored over 180 reports and papers. He mapped glacial deposits and landforms from the eastern Dakotas to Pennsylvania. He is credited with establishing that there was multiple glaciation (due to changes in climate).

He was elected a fellow of both the Geological Society of America and the American Association for the Advancement of Science, becoming Vice President of the latter in 1928. He was an elected member of both the American Philosophical Society and the United States National Academy of Sciences.

Leverett married Frances Gibson on December 22, 1887, and later married Dorothy Park on December 18, 1895, after Gibson's death. He did not have children by either marriage. Leverett died on November 15, 1943, after a brief illness at his home in Ann Arbor, Michigan. A fortnight before his death a bust of Leverett was constructed by the sculptor Carleton Angell.

The Leverett Glacier in Antarctica, Leverett Glacier in Greenland, Lake Leverett in Washington (since drained), and plant species Sigillaria leveretti were named after Frank Leverett.

== Professional writings ==
- The Illinois Ice Lobe; Frank Leverett; U.S. Geological Survey, Monograph, #38; Government Printing Office; Washington, D.C.; 1899
- Glacial formations and drainage features of the Erie and Ohio basins, Frank Leverett; U.S. Geol. Survey, Mon. 41, 802 pages, 25 p1s., 8 figs.;1902
- Surface Geology of the Northern Peninsula of Michigan; Frank Leverett; Michigan Geological and Biological Survey, Publication 7. Geological Series 5.; Lansing, Michigan: 1910
- Surface Geology and Agricultural Conditions of the Southern Peninsula of Michigan; Frank Leverett; Michigan Geological and Biological Survey, Publication 9. Geological Series 7.; Lansing, Michigan: 1911
- The Pleistocene of Indiana and Michigan and the History of the Great Lakes, Monograph 53; Frank Leverett & Frank B. Taylor, U.S. Geological Survey; Government Printing Office, Washington; 1915
- Moraines and shore lines of the Lake Superior region; Frank Leverett; U.S. Geological Survey Prof. Papers 154-A; p. 19, Pl.1; Government Printing Office; Washington, D.C.; 1929
- Relative length of Pleistocene glacial and interglacial stages; Frank Leverett; Science, vol. 72; pp. 193–195; 1930
- The place of the Iowan drive; Frank Leverett; Journal of Geology, Vol. 47; pp 398–407; pp. 400–402; 1939
- Note by Frank Leverett; Frank Leverett; Journal of Geology, vol. 50; pp. 1001–1002; 1942
