= Marquette Catholic Schools =

Defunct Catholic school in Iowa, USA

Marquette Catholic Schools was a Roman Catholic school with its administrative offices in West Point, Iowa.

Circa 1997 its campuses were: Marquette Primary School in Houghton, Marquette Intermediate School in St. Paul, and Marquette Senior High School in West Point.

In 2005 it merged with Aquinas Schools of Fort Madison to form Holy Trinity Catholic Schools. The Marquette building was chosen for junior high school while the Aquinas building was chosen for senior high school. The merger was due to increasing costs and the declining population of Lee County, the latter of which meant reduced numbers of pupils.

Campuses in Lee County, Iowa
