= Denmark Congregational United Church of Christ =

- Denmark Congregational Church
- U.S. National Register of Historic Places
- Location within Iowa Location within the United States
- Location: Academy Ave. and 4th St., Denmark, Iowa
- Coordinates: 40°44′31″N 91°20′0″W
- Area: 2 acres (0.81 ha)
- Built: 1863-1864
- NRHP reference No.: 77000534
- Added to NRHP: December 2, 1977

Denmark Congregational United Church of Christ is located in Denmark, Iowa, United States. The church building was listed on the National Register of Historic Places as Denmark Congregational Church in 1977. The church is noteworthy because of its association with the Rev. Asa Turner, Jr. He was a noted abolitionist and supporter of the temperance movement, who was the pastor of the congregation in its early years. He was an early Congregationalist missionary to Iowa and encouraged the American Home Missionary Society to send more missionaries to the Iowa Territory. His requests resulted in the arrival of nine young men from Andover Theological Seminary in 1843. Known as the "Iowa Band", they established churches in eastern Iowa based on Turner's Denmark church.

The church building is a brick structure with a truncated square tower. A tall, slender spire had been completed in 1871, but was lost in a storm in 1953. Instead of replacing it, the crenelations were created at the top of the tower instead. A pedimented vestibule is located at the base of the tower. The side elevations are three bays long with a round-arch window in each bay. The interior of the church is plain. An education wing was built to the west of the church in 1958, and a vestibule on the east side (date unknown) replaced a previous vestibule.
