= Jim Youel =

American football player (1922–2020)

No. 30
- Position: Quarterback

Personal information
- Born: February 13, 1922; Vinton, Iowa, U.S.
- Died: April 9, 2020 (aged 98); Traer, Iowa, U.S.

Career information
- High school: Fort Madison (IA)
- College: Iowa

Career history
- Washington Redskins (1946–1948); Boston Yanks (1948)

Career statistics
- Passing attempts: 146
- Passing completions: 50
- Completion percentage: 34.2%
- TD–INT: 7–10
- Passing yards: 849
- Passer rating: 42.3
- Stats at Pro Football Reference

James Stewart Youel (February 13, 1922 – April 9, 2020) was an American football quarterback who played three seasons in the National Football League (NFL). He played college football for the Iowa Hawkeyes.

== Early life and education ==
Youel was born in Vinton, Iowa and attended Fort Madison High School, where he participated in football, basketball, and track. His mother was originally hesitant to let him play football because she had lost a brother to a cervical fracture of the spine while playing football.

== College career ==
Youel attended and played college football at the University of Iowa as a quarterback and punter. In 1942, he helped the Hawkeyes defeat the previously unbeaten Wisconsin Badgers, 6–0. During the game, he had four punts of 50+ yards, which helped stall the Wisconsin offense. After the 1942 season, Youel was chosen to play in the Chicago College All-Star Game, and the All-Stars beat the Washington Redskins 27–7. In 1943, Youel graduated with a degree in mechanical engineering.

== Naval service ==
After graduating from college, Youel enlisted in the United States Navy during World War II. While stationed at Naval Station Great Lakes, he played football and was a boxer.

== Professional career ==
After finishing his service with the Navy, Youel was signed by Cleveland Rams in January 1945. However, he was traded to the Washington Redskins for guard Al Fiorentino before ever playing with the Rams. In 1946 and 1947 with the Redskins, he served as the backup quarterback for Sammy Baugh.

On June 1, 1948, Youel was traded, along with end Joe Duckworth, to the Boston Yanks for offensive tackle Tom Dean. He started only one game for the Yanks (in early October) and was then waived, after which he was signed by the Detroit Lions. Youel misunderstood the signing, however, and accidentally reported to the Philadelphia Eagles, and missed the October 24th game against the Los Angeles Rams. He then took a train to Detroit where he was informed that he had been sent to the Rams. Youel never played for the Rams, however, and was sent back to the Washington Redskins for the end of the 1948 season.

== Personal life ==
After Youel retired from the NFL, he became a math teacher and football coach for his alma mater, Fort Madison High School. In 2008, Fort Madison renamed their football field "Jim Youel Field" in his honor. Youel was named to the Iowa Football Coaches Association Hall of Fame.

He died on April 9, 2020, in Traer, Iowa at age 98.
