= St. Paul, Iowa =

- City
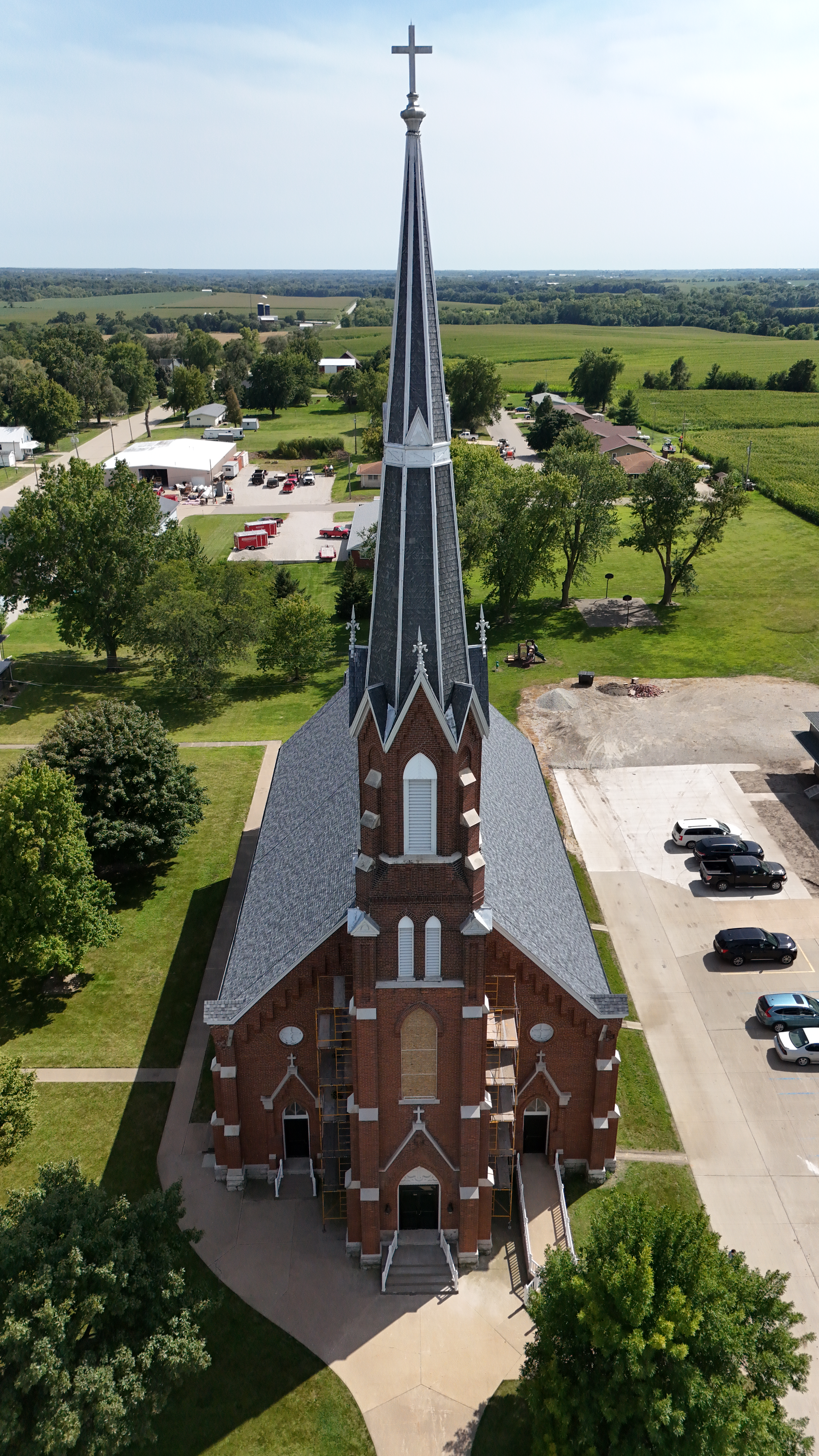
- St. James the Less Catholic Church in St. Paul

- Location of St. Paul, Iowa
- Coordinates: 40°46′04″N 91°30′59″W
- Country: United States
- State: Iowa
- County: Lee

Area
  - Total: 0.38 sq mi (0.99 km^{2})
  - Land: 0.38 sq mi (0.99 km^{2})
  - Water: 0 sq mi (0.00 km^{2})
- Elevation: 702 ft (214 m)

Population (2020)
  - Total: 109
  - Density: 286.5/sq mi (110.61/km^{2})
- Time zone: UTC-6 (Central (CST))
  - Summer (DST): UTC-5 (CDT)
- FIPS code: 19-70185
- GNIS feature ID: 2396512

St. Paul or Saint Paul is a city in Lee County, Iowa, United States. The population was 109 at the time of the 2020 census. It is part of the Fort Madison-Keokuk Micropolitan Statistical Area

== History ==
St. Paul was laid out in 1866.

== Geography ==
According to the United States Census Bureau, the city has a total area of 0.38 square miles (0.98 km^{2}), all land.

== Demographics ==
Historical populations
Year	Pop.	±%
1880	37	—
1900	65	+75.7%
1910	62	−4.6%
1920	67	+8.1%
1930	89	+32.8%
1940	94	+5.6%
1950	113	+20.2%
1960	128	+13.3%
1970	129	+0.8%
1980	141	+9.3%
1990	120	−14.9%
2000	118	−1.7%
2010	129	+9.3%
2020	109	−15.5%
Source:"U.S. Census website". United States Census Bureau. and Iowa Data Center; Source: U.S. Decennial Census

=== 2020 census ===
As of the census of 2020, there were 109 people, 38 households, and 30 families residing in the city. The population density was 286.5 inhabitants per square mile (110.6/km^{2}). There were 49 housing units at an average density of 128.8 per square mile (49.7/km^{2}). The racial makeup of the city was 96.3% White, 0.9% Black or African American, 0.0% Native American, 0.0% Asian, 0.0% Pacific Islander, 0.0% from other races and 2.8% from two or more races. Hispanic or Latino persons of any race comprised 0.0% of the population.

Of the 38 households, 39.5% of which had children under the age of 18 living with them, 52.6% were married couples living together, 5.3% were cohabitating couples, 26.3% had a female householder with no spouse or partner present and 15.8% had a male householder with no spouse or partner present. 21.1% of all households were non-families. 21.1% of all households were made up of individuals, 7.9% had someone living alone who was 65 years old or older.

The median age in the city was 37.5 years. 24.8% of the residents were under the age of 20; 4.6% were between the ages of 20 and 24; 29.4% were from 25 and 44; 22.0% were from 45 and 64; and 19.3% were 65 years of age or older. The gender makeup of the city was 45.0% male and 55.0% female.

=== 2010 census ===
At the 2010 census there were 129 people in 52 households, including 36 families, in the city. The population density was 339.5 inhabitants per square mile (131.1/km^{2}). There were 53 housing units at an average density of 139.5 per square mile (53.9/km^{2}). The racial makup of the city was 98.4% White, 0.8% Asian, and 0.8% from two or more races.

Of the 52 households 21.2% had children under the age of 18 living with them, 57.7% were married couples living together, 9.6% had a female householder with no husband present, 1.9% had a male householder with no wife present, and 30.8% were non-families. 28.8% of households were one person and 5.8% were one person aged 65 or older. The average household size was 2.48 and the average family size was 3.11.

The median age was 44.5 years. 21.7% of residents were under the age of 18; 6.3% were between the ages of 18 and 24; 22.5% were from 25 to 44; 33.4% were from 45 to 64; and 16.3% were 65 or older. The gender makeup of the city was 49.6% male and 50.4% female.

=== 2000 census ===
At the 2000 census there were 118 people, 52 households, and 30 families residing in St. Paul. The population density was 312.3 inhabitants per square mile (120.6/km^{2}). There were 55 housing units at an average density of 145.5 per square mile (56.2/km^{2}). The racial makup of the city was 98.31% White, and 1.69% from two or more races.

Of the 52 households 28.8% had children under the age of 18 living with them, 53.8% were married couples living together, 3.8% had a female householder with no husband present, and 40.4% were non-families. 32.7% of households were one person and 17.3% were one person aged 65 or older. The average household size was 2.27 and the average family size was 2.97.

The age distribution was 22.9% under the age of 18, 3.4% from 18 to 24, 33.1% from 25 to 44, 24.6% from 45 to 64, and 16.1% 65 or older. The median age was 39 years. For every 100 females, there were 84.4 males. For every 100 females age 18 and over, there were 102.2 males.

The median household income was $45,313 and the median family income was $58,750. Males had a median income of $37,188 versus $25,625 for females. The per capita income for the city was $20,312. There were no families and 3.9% of the population living below the poverty line, including no under eighteens and 14.3% of those over 64.

== Education ==
Fort Madison Community School District serves the city; its high school is Fort Madison High School.

The Roman Catholic Holy Trinity Catholic Schools maintains a preschool campus and its sole elementary campus in West Point and the secondary school is in Fort Madison. Previously the Marquette Catholic School System maintained its middle school in St. Paul; in 2005 it merged into the Holy Trinity system. Previously Holy Trinity had its preschool in St. Paul.

== Notable person ==
- Sebastian Menke, Catholic priest who served as the tenth president of St. Ambrose College.
