= Dale Atkeson =

American football player (1930–2007)

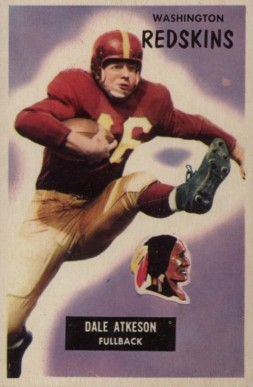
- Atkeson on a 1955 Bowman football card

No. 46
- Position: Fullback

Personal information
- Born: December 24, 1930; Kansas City, Missouri, U.S.
- Died: May 10, 2007 (aged 76)

Career information
- College: none

Career history
- 1954–1956: Washington Redskins
- Stats at Pro Football Reference

Dale Wayne Atkeson (December 24, 1930 – May 10, 2007) was an American professional football fullback in the National Football League for the Washington Redskins. He did not attend college.

Atkeson was traded by the Redskins to the Pittsburgh Steelers following the 1956 season. However, he never played for the Steelers after suffering a torn Achilles tendon. He was cut by the team during training camp in 1958.
