= Denmark, Iowa =

- Census-designated place
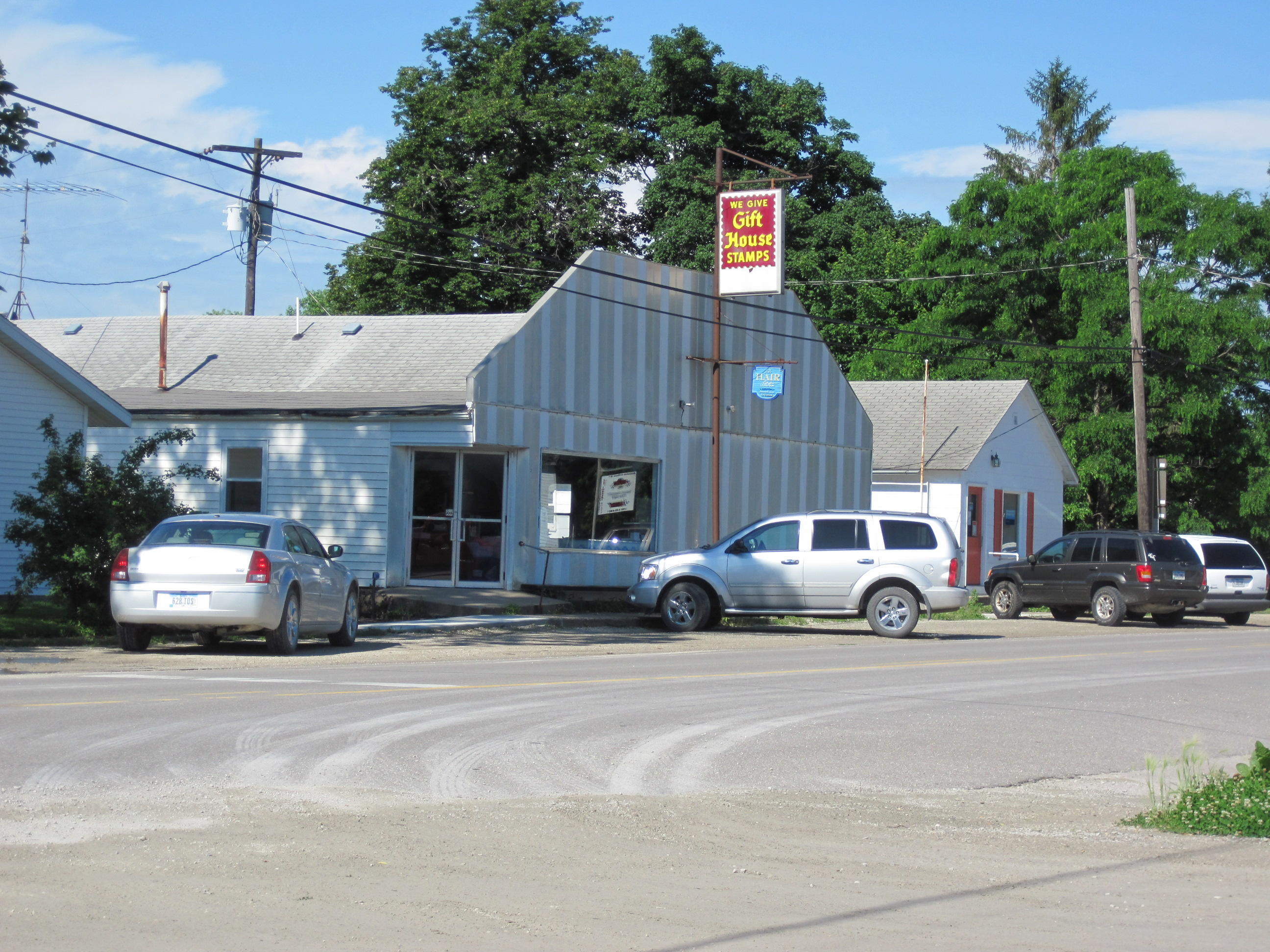
- Buildings in Denmark, Iowa

- Location in Iowa Location in the United States
- Coordinates: 40°44′30″N 91°20′15″W
- Country: United States
- State: Iowa
- County: Lee
- Township: Denmark

Area
  - Total: 1.66 sq mi (4.31 km^{2})
  - Land: 1.66 sq mi (4.30 km^{2})
  - Water: 0.0039 sq mi (0.01 km^{2})
- Elevation: 722 ft (220 m)

Population (2020)
  - Total: 425
  - Density: 256/sq mi (98.8/km^{2})
- Time zone: UTC-6 (Central (CST))
  - Summer (DST): UTC-5 (CDT)
- ZIP code: 52624
- FIPS code: 1919990
- GNIS feature ID: 455882

Denmark is an unincorporated community and census-designated place (CDP) in northeastern Lee County, Iowa, United States. It lies along Iowa Highway 16, north of the city of Fort Madison, the county seat of Lee County. Its elevation is 722 feet (220 m) above sea level. Although Denmark is unincorporated, it has a post office with the ZIP code of 52624, that opened on April 7, 1846. The town also has a branch of Farmers Savings Bank that opened in 1935. The community is part of the Fort Madison–Keokuk, IA-MO Micropolitan Statistical Area. As of the 2020 census, its population was 425.

Denmark was laid out circa 1837.

== Demographics ==
Historical population
Census	Pop.	Note	%±
2010	423		—
2020	425		0.5%
U.S. Decennial Census

=== 2020 census ===
As of the census of 2020, there were 425 people, 175 households, and 117 families residing in the community. The population density was 255.9 inhabitants per square mile (98.8/km^{2}). There were 188 housing units at an average density of 113.2 per square mile (43.7/km^{2}). The racial makeup of the community was 94.1% White, 1.6% Black or African American, 0.5% Native American, 0.0% Asian, 0.0% Pacific Islander, 1.4% from other races and 2.4% from two or more races. Hispanic or Latino persons of any race comprised 1.9% of the population.

Of the 175 households, 16.6% of which had children under the age of 18 living with them, 54.3% were married couples living together, 3.4% were cohabitating couples, 26.9% had a female householder with no spouse or partner present and 15.4% had a male householder with no spouse or partner present. 33.1% of all households were non-families. 29.1% of all households were made up of individuals, 17.7% had someone living alone who was 65 years old or older.

The median age in the community was 41.3 years. 26.4% of the residents were under the age of 20; 5.4% were between the ages of 20 and 24; 21.4% were from 25 and 44; 21.9% were from 45 and 64; and 24.9% were 65 years of age or older. The gender makeup of the community was 48.0% male and 52.0% female.

== History ==
In 1836, four families emigrated from the town and church of New Ipswich, NH to Denmark in what was then Wisconsin Territory, now in Iowa. Within a short time they were followed by eight other families. They all carried with them the same standard of right living and wise planning for the best interest of those who should come after them that they had known in New Ipswich. Those who "laid out the town of Denmark, which is three-fourths of a mile square, into town lots for building, donated one-half of those lots to the purpose of Education." In the building of a church and of an academy they followed as closely as possible the example set by the founders of New Ipswich. The church set up by the settlers is the oldest Congregational church in Iowa. They were early known as champions of freedom. "Under the leadership of their pastor, Rev. Asa Turner, they joined with others in the election of Governor Grimes in 1854, which changed the political history of Iowa and gave birth to the Republican party in the nation." Dr. Turner and Rev. Mr. Lee were classmates at Yale College and lifelong friends. His pastorate continued for thirty years; and his influence led to Iowa the eleven young men from Andover Seminary who formed the "Iowa Band," one of whom, their historian, was Rev. Ephraim Adams, a son of New Ipswich.

The population was 200 in 1940.

== Education ==
The Fort Madison Community School District serves Denmark, operating Lincoln and Richardson elementary schools, Fort Madison Middle School, and Fort Madison High School.

Previously the district operated Denmark Elementary School in Denmark; in 1998 the school had about 305 students. It originated from the establishment of Denmark Academy in 1845. The original building was destroyed in a fire circa 1924. The district decided to close Denmark Elementary in 2012. Ken Marang, the superintendent, stated that the "outdated" building had problems with mold and water leakage and that the fact that "doors open out into the hallways" made it "unsafe".

== Notable people ==
- Frank Leverett, geologist, was born near Denmark.
- Catharine Van Valkenburg Waite, women's suffrage activist, lived in Denmark as a child.

== See also ==
- Denmark Congregational United Church of Christ, listed on the National Register of Historic Places in Iowa
