= Fort Madison Community School District =

Public school district in Fort Madison, Iowa, United States

Coordinates: 40.625842°N 91.332596°W

Location
- Fort Madison, Iowa Lee and Henry counties United States
- Coordinates: 40.625842, -91.332596

District information
- Type: Local school district
- Grades: K-12
- Superintendent: Erin Slater
- Schools: Lincoln Elementary School, Richardson Elementary School, Fort Madison Middle School, and Fort Madison High School
- Budget: $30,875,000 (2020-21)
- NCES District ID: 1911850

Students and staff
- Students: 1832 (2022-23)
- Teachers: 134.65 FTE
- Staff: 201.82 FTE
- Student–teacher ratio: 13.61
- Athletic conference: Southeast Conference
- District mascot: Bloodhounds
- Colors: Red and Black

Other information
- Website: www.fmcsd.org

Fort Madison Community School District is a rural public school district headquartered in Fort Madison, Iowa. Mostly in Lee County, with a small portion in Henry County, it serves Fort Madison, Houghton, St. Paul, and West Point. It also serves the unincorporated area of Denmark.

In 2007 the district had a $16 million bond proposal for building a new K-8 campus that would replace Fort Madison Middle School and Denmark Elementary School, but voters rejected it; KHQA stated they did so "overwhelmingly".

There was a bond proposal $30 million that had been rejected three times, with the third having 59.9% voting in favor when 60% was required for a pass.

== Schools ==
- Fort Madison High School
- Fort Madison Middle School
  - The current school, serving grades 4 through 8, is in western Fort Madison. The previous Fort Madison Middle School building once serves as Fort Madison High School. The district closed this building in 2012. Superintendent Ken Marang stated that the school was too small and crowded for its purpose, citing "small rooms, narrow hallways and convoluted stairways." As of 2015 developer Todd Schneider was creating a 39-unit apartment complex from the former Fort Madison Middle building, within a development which Schneider spent $4.5 million to renovate.
  - As of 2012 the school had about 500 students.
- Lincoln Elementary School
- Richardson Elementary School

Former schools:

- Denmark Elementary School (Denmark, unincorporated area)
  - In 1998 the school had about 305 students. It originated from the establishment of Denmark Academy in 1845. The original building was destroyed in a fire circa 1924. The district decided to Denmark Elementary in 2012. Marang stated that the "outdated" building had problems with mold and water leakage and that the fact that "doors open out into the hallways" made it "unsafe". Circa 2013 some residents were calling for the school to be dismantled and the land given to the community.
- Jefferson Elementary School (Fort Madison)
- Creative Learning Center (alternative school)

== See also ==
- List of school districts in Iowa
