= Fort Madison High School =

Public secondary school in Fort Madison, Iowa, United States

- 2001 Ave B Fort Madison, Iowa 52627; USA

Information
- Superintendent: Erin Slater
- Principal: Patrick Lamb and Adrian McKay
- Teaching staff: 39.15 (FTE)
- Grades: 9-12
- Enrollment: 561 (2023-2024)
- Student to teacher ratio: 14.33
- Colors: Crimson and Black
- Athletics conference: Southeast
- Mascot: Bloodhound
- Website: www.fmcsd.org

The Fort Madison High School (FMHS) is located in Fort Madison, Iowa. As the only high school of the Fort Madison Community School District, it serves Fort Madison, Houghton, St. Paul, and West Point. It also serves the unincorporated area of Denmark.

== Athletics ==
The Bloodhounds compete in the Southeast Conference in the following sports:

- Baseball
  - 2000 Class 3A State Champions
- Basketball
- Cross Country
  - Boys' 2-time State Champions (1925, 1926)
  - Girls' 1979 Class 3A State Champions
- Football
- Golf
- Soccer
- Softball
- Tennis
- Track and Field
- Volleyball
- Wrestling

== See also ==
- List of high schools in Iowa
