= Martin Graber =

American politician (1952–2025)

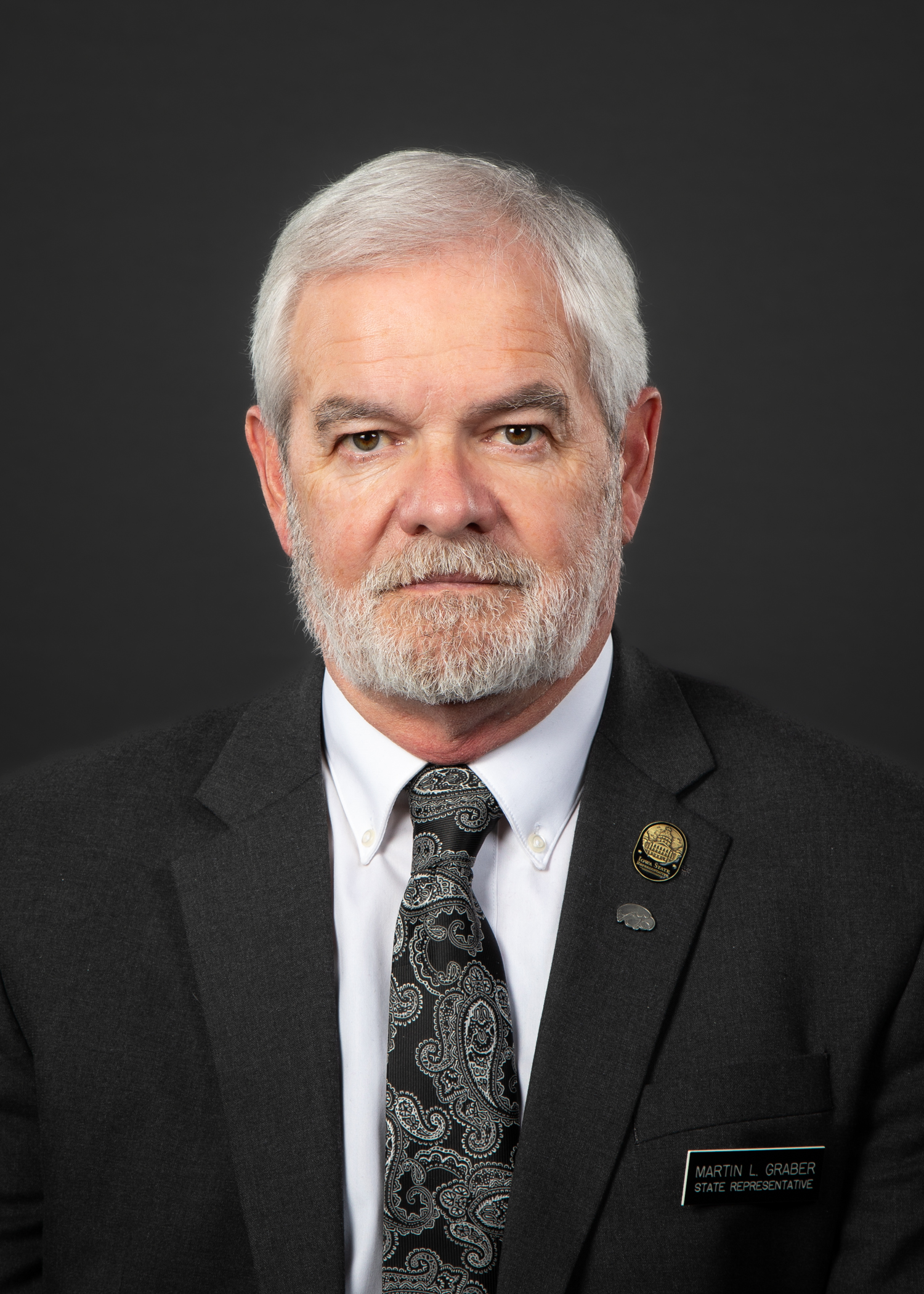
- Official portrait, 2023

Member of the Iowa House of Representatives
- In office January 10, 2021 – January 31, 2025
- Preceded by: Jeff Kurtz
- Succeeded by: Blaine Watkins
- Constituency: 83rd district (2021–2023); 100th district (2023–2025)

Personal details
- Born: June 3, 1952 Donnellson, Iowa, U.S.
- Died: January 31, 2025 (aged 72) Fort Madison, Iowa, U.S.
- Party: Republican
- Spouse: Coni Graber
- Children: 2
- Education: University of Iowa (BBA); St. Ambrose University (MBA); United States Army War College (MSS)

Military service
- Allegiance: United States
- Branch/service: Iowa National Guard
- Rank: Brigadier General

Martin L. Graber (June 3, 1952 – January 31, 2025) was an American politician who was a Republican member of the Iowa House of Representatives from 2021 until his death. Formerly serving district 83, he was serving District 100 at the time of his death.

== Education and early career ==
Graber was born on June 3, 1952, in Donnellson, Iowa. He was raised there and attended Central Lee High School. He earned a degree in business administration at the University of Iowa, and completed a master's degree in business at St. Ambrose University in 1987, followed by a master's degree in strategic studies at the United States Army War College in 2002. Graber served 32 years in the National Guard, retiring with the rank of brigadier general within the Iowa National Guard. During Operation Desert Storm, Graber was deployed to Germany. At other times during his military career, he served with the 224th Engineer Battalion and at Camp Dodge. From 1980 to 1991, Graber was a manager within the human resources department of the Dial Corporation. From 1991, he worked for Ameriprise Financial Service in Fort Madison, Iowa, as a financial adviser.

== Political career ==
At the time of his first state legislative campaign in 2020, Graber was still working for Amerprise, and was serving his second term as chair of the Lee County Republican Party. Graber filed for the Republican nomination for District 83 of the Iowa House of Representatives in March 2020, and defeated incumbent legislator Jeff Kurtz in the November 2020 general elections.

== Personal life and death ==
Graber and his wife, Coni, had two children. He died in Fort Madison, Iowa, on January 31, 2025, at the age of 72.
