= Rickie Harris =

American football player (born 1943)

No. 46, 25
- Positions: Defensive back, Return specialist

Personal information
- Born: May 15, 1943 (age 83); St. Louis, Missouri, U.S.
- Listed height: 5 ft 11 in (1.80 m)
- Listed weight: 182 lb (83 kg)

Career information
- High school: John C. Fremont (South Los Angeles, California)
- College: Arizona
- NFL draft: 1965: undrafted

Career history
- Washington Redskins (1965–1970); New England Patriots (1971–1972); Florida Blazers (1974); Memphis Southmen (1975)

Career NFL statistics
- Interceptions: 15
- Kick return yards: 2,326
- Touchdowns: 4
- Stats at Pro Football Reference

Rickie Calvin Harris (born May 15, 1943) is an American former professional football player who was a defensive back in the National Football League (NFL) for the Washington Redskins and the New England Patriots. He played college football for the Arizona Wildcats.

In December 1966, Harris returned a punt for an NFL-record loss of 28 yards.

== See also ==
- List of NCAA major college yearly punt and kickoff return leaders
