= West Point, Iowa =

- City
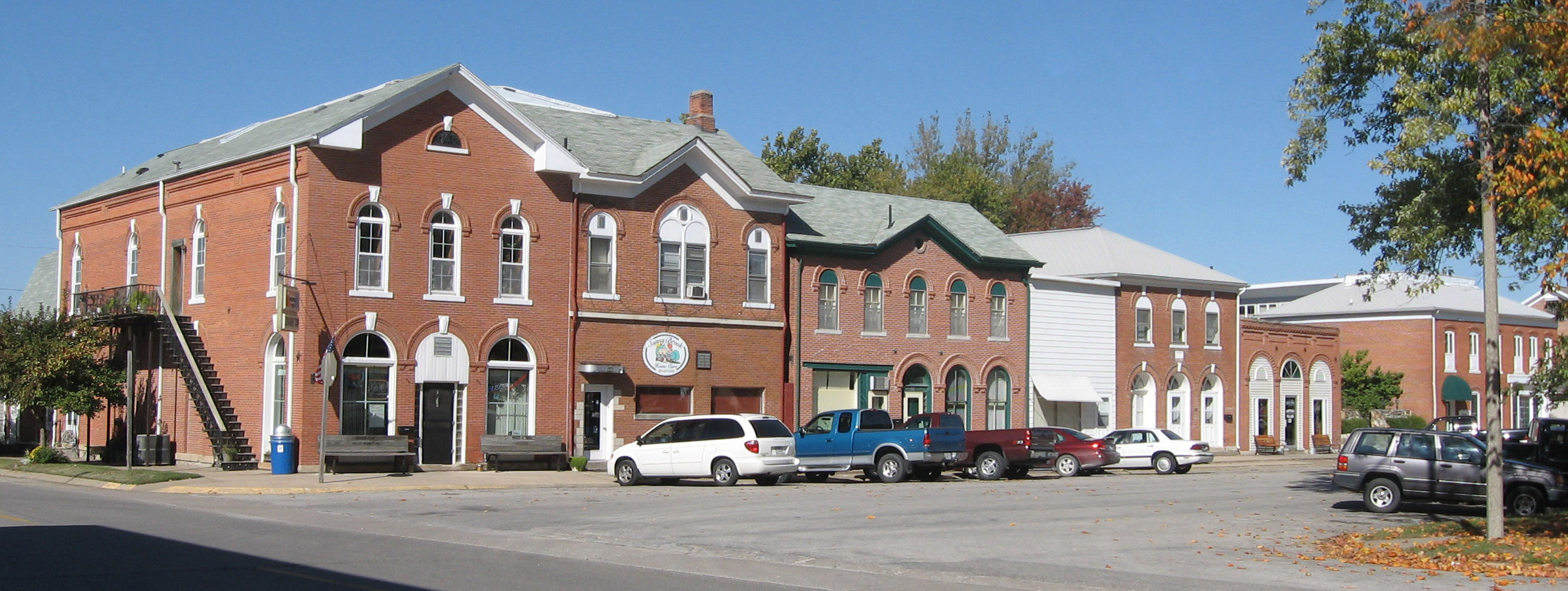
- Buildings in Downtown West Point, Iowa
- Motto: "Home of the Sweet Corn Festival"
- Location of West Point, Iowa
- Coordinates: 40°42′52″N 91°27′10″W
- Country: United States
- State: Iowa
- County: Lee

Area
  - Total: 0.64 sq mi (1.65 km^{2})
  - Land: 0.64 sq mi (1.65 km^{2})
  - Water: 0 sq mi (0.00 km^{2})
- Elevation: 774 ft (236 m)

Population (2020)
  - Total: 921
  - Density: 1,448.7/sq mi (559.34/km^{2})
- Time zone: UTC-6 (Central (CST))
  - Summer (DST): UTC-5 (CDT)
- ZIP codes: 52656-52657
- Area code: 319
- FIPS code: 19-84585
- GNIS feature ID: 2397274
- Website: City of West Point, Iowa

West Point is a city in Lee County, Iowa, United States. The population was 921 at the time of the 2020 census. It is part of the Fort Madison–Keokuk, IA-MO Micropolitan Statistical Area.

== History ==
West Point was incorporated on March 25, 1858. The name of West Point was chosen by officers of the garrison at Fort Des Moines (Montrose).

== Geography ==
According to the United States Census Bureau, the city has a total area of 0.61 square miles (1.58 km^{2}), all land.

== Demographics ==
Historical populations
Year	Pop.	±%
1850	546	—
1870	794	+45.4%
1880	704	−11.3%
1890	498	−29.3%
1900	654	+31.3%
1910	570	−12.8%
1920	591	+3.7%
1930	536	−9.3%
1940	543	+1.3%
1950	662	+21.9%
1960	758	+14.5%
1970	1,045	+37.9%
1980	1,133	+8.4%
1990	1,079	−4.8%
2000	980	−9.2%
2010	966	−1.4%
2020	921	−4.7%
Source:"U.S. Census website". United States Census Bureau. and Iowa Data Center; Source: U.S. Decennial Census

=== 2020 census ===
As of the census of 2020, there were 921 people, 426 households, and 246 families residing in the city. The population density was 1,448.7 inhabitants per square mile (559.3/km^{2}). There were 464 housing units at an average density of 729.9 per square mile (281.8/km^{2}). The racial makeup of the city was 96.2% White, 0.4% Black or African American, 0.0% Native American, 0.0% Asian, 0.0% Pacific Islander, 0.3% from other races and 3.0% from two or more races. Hispanic or Latino persons of any race comprised 0.7% of the population.

Of the 426 households, 21.4% of which had children under the age of 18 living with them, 48.6% were married couples living together, 5.6% were cohabitating couples, 25.6% had a female householder with no spouse or partner present and 20.2% had a male householder with no spouse or partner present. 42.3% of all households were non-families. 36.2% of all households were made up of individuals, 20.4% had someone living alone who was 65 years old or older.

The median age in the city was 47.9 years. 20.5% of the residents were under the age of 20; 4.2% were between the ages of 20 and 24; 21.4% were from 25 and 44; 24.4% were from 45 and 64; and 29.4% were 65 years of age or older. The gender makeup of the city was 49.0% male and 51.0% female.

=== 2010 census ===
As of the census of 2010, there were 966 people, 432 households, and 267 families living in the city. The population density was 1,583.6 inhabitants per square mile (611.4/km^{2}). There were 452 housing units at an average density of 741.0 per square mile (286.1/km^{2}). The racial makeup of the city was 99.1% White, 0.3% African American, 0.1% Asian, and 0.5% from two or more races. Hispanic or Latino of any race were 0.9% of the population.

There were 432 households, of which 26.2% had children under the age of 18 living with them, 51.6% were married couples living together, 6.3% had a female householder with no husband present, 3.9% had a male householder with no wife present, and 38.2% were non-families. 33.8% of all households were made up of individuals, and 15.7% had someone living alone who was 65 years of age or older. The average household size was 2.17 and the average family size was 2.71.

The median age in the city was 44.2 years. 20.7% of residents were under the age of 18; 6.8% were between the ages of 18 and 24; 23.6% were from 25 to 44; 26.3% were from 45 to 64; and 22.7% were 65 years of age or older. The gender makeup of the city was 47.2% male and 52.8% female.

=== 2000 census ===
As of the census of 2000, there were 980 people, 426 households, and 264 families living in the city. The population density was 1,687.8 inhabitants per square mile (651.7/km^{2}). There were 450 housing units at an average density of 775.0 per square mile (299.2/km^{2}). The racial makeup of the city was 99.90% White, 0.10% from other races. Hispanic or Latino of any race were 0.51% of the population.

There were 426 households, out of which 26.3% had children under the age of 18 living with them, 53.8% were married couples living together, 6.6% had a female householder with no husband present, and 37.8% were non-families. 33.8% of all households were made up of individuals, and 18.8% had someone living alone who was 65 years of age or older. The average household size was 2.19 and the average family size was 2.83.

In the city, the population was spread out, with 20.6% under the age of 18, 5.9% from 18 to 24, 24.3% from 25 to 44, 25.2% from 45 to 64, and 24.0% who were 65 years of age or older. The median age was 44 years. For every 100 females, there were 84.6 males. For every 100 females age 18 and over, there were 85.7 males.

The median income for a household in the city was $38,409, and the median income for a family was $50,724. Males had a median income of $36,797 versus $22,750 for females. The per capita income for the city was $27,289. About 4.6% of families and 4.4% of the population were below the poverty line, including 2.9% of those under age 18 and 4.0% of those age 65 or over.

== Education ==
Fort Madison Community School District serves the city; its high school is Fort Madison High School.

The Roman Catholic Holy Trinity Catholic Schools maintains an elementary campus in West Point; the secondary school is in Fort Madison, and there are early childhood campuses in Fort Madison and St. Paul. Previously the Marquette Catholic School System maintained its high school and administrative offices in West Point; in 2005 it merged into the Holy Trinity system.

== Sweet Corn Festival ==
West Point is home to Iowa's Largest Sweet Corn Festival. The first festival was in August 1958. There are nearly 25,000 visitors during the four-day event and over 17 tons of sweet corn. The festival includes free sweet corn and stage entertainment, arts and crafts, bingo, 5K and 10K run, queen crowning, tractor pull, city parade, and teen dance.

== Notable people ==
- Gene Fraise, Iowa farmer and state legislator
- Imogene King, a pioneer in nursing theory and practice
