= Jerry Kearns =

American politician (born 1944)

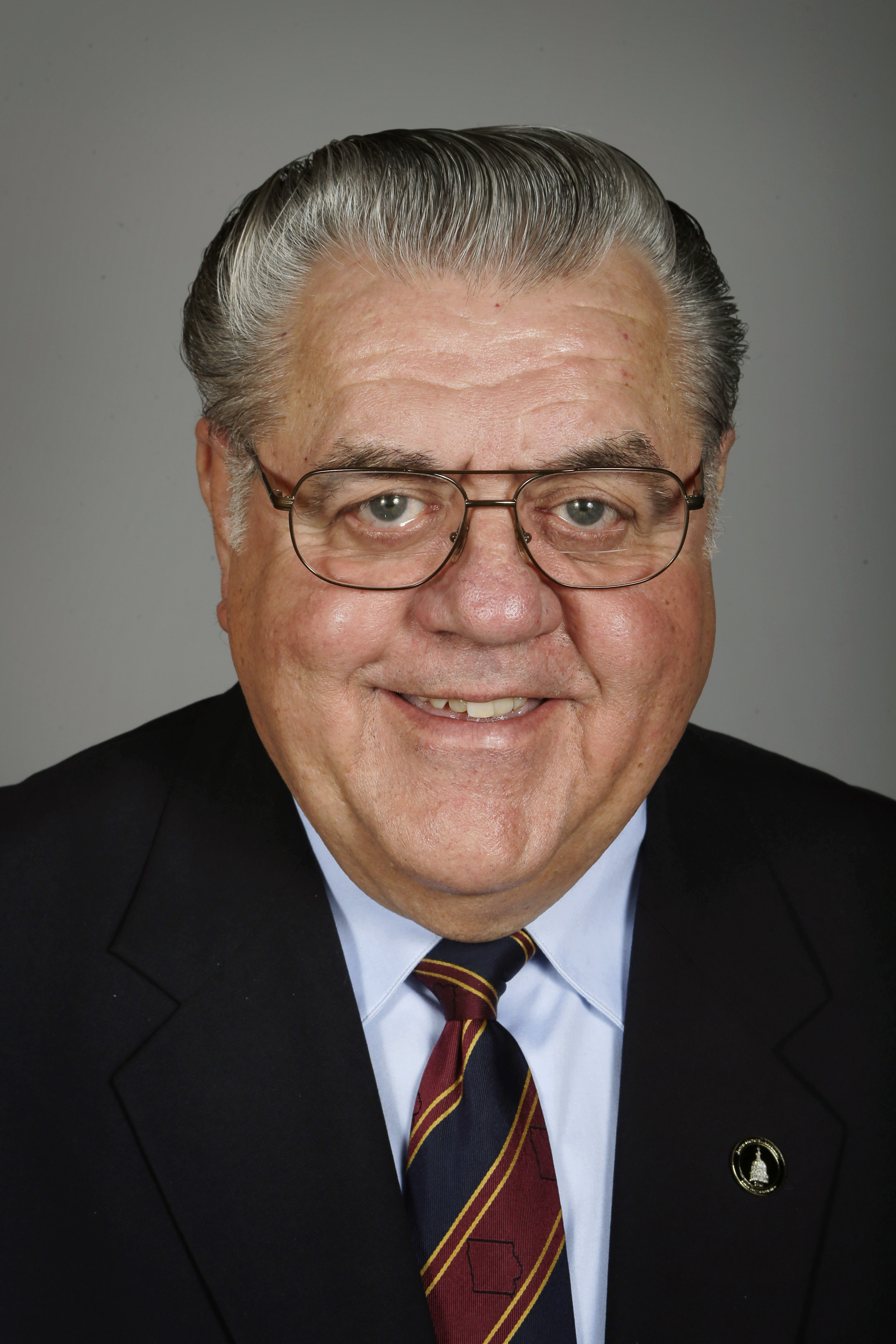

Member of the Iowa House of Representatives from the 92nd district
- In office January 12, 2009 – January 14, 2019

Personal details
- Born: July 8, 1944 (age 82) Clark County, Missouri
- Party: Democratic
- Spouse: Diane
- Education: Southeast Iowa Community College
- Occupation: Industrial electrician, union representative

Jerry A. Kearns (born July 8, 1944) is a Democratic politician who represented the 83rd district in the Iowa House of Representatives from 2009 to 2019. He was a ranking member of the Veterans Affairs Committee, and served on the Agriculture, Labor, and Ways and Means Committee.

== Education ==
Kearns graduated from Wyaconda High School in Missouri in 1962. He later attended Southeast Iowa Community College and also went to a four-year electrician apprenticeship.

== Career ==
From 1965 to 1969, Kearns served in the US Air Force. He went on to spend 38 years as an industrial electrician at Henniges Automotive.

== Organizations ==
Kearns has been a member of the following organizations:

- Lee County Board of Supervisors
- American Legion
- Elks Club
- University of Iowa Labor Advisory Board
- Lee County Democratic Party
- Iowa Democratic Party
- Keokuk's Trinity United Methodist Church

== Family ==
Kearns is married to his wife Diane and together they have two sons, Christopher and Aaron, along with seven grandchildren.
